= 1956 Peruvian Segunda División =

Peruvian Segunda División
- Season: 1956
- Dates: 18 August 1956 – 29 December 1956
- Champions: Porvenir Miraflores
- Runner up: Unión América
- Relegated: Unión Callao
- Top goalscorer: Pedro Lobatón (16)

The 1956 Peruvian Segunda División, the second division of Peruvian football (soccer), was played by 10 teams. The tournament winner, Porvenir Miraflores was promoted to the 1957 Peruvian Primera División.

== Competition format ==
All teams faced each other in a double round-robin format, playing home and away matches. The team that accumulated the highest number of points at the end of the season was automatically crowned champion and promoted to the Peruvian Primera División, while the team with the fewest points was relegated to the Ligas Provinciales de Lima y Callao.

Two points were awarded for a win, one point for a draw, and no points for a loss.

== Teams ==
=== Team changes ===
Promoted from 1955 Liguilla de Ascenso	Promoted to 1956 Primera División	Relegated from 1955 Primera División	Relegated to 1956 Liga Provincial del Callao
▲ Unidad Vecinal Nº3 (1st)	▲ Carlos Concha (1st)	▼ Unión Callao (10th)	▼ Jorge Chávez (10th)

=== Stadia and locations ===
Team	City
Association Chorrillos	Chorrillos, Lima
Atlético Lusitania	Cercado de Lima
Defensor Arica	Breña, Lima
Juventud Gloria	Cercado de Lima
KDT Nacional	Callao
Porvenir Miraflores	Miraflores, Lima
Santiago Barranco	Barranco, Lima
Unidad Vecinal Nº3	Cercado de Lima
Unión América	Cercado de Lima
Unión Callao	Callao

== League table ==
=== Standings ===
Pos	Team	Pld	W	D	L	GF	GA	GD	Pts	Qualification or relegation
1	Porvenir Miraflores (C)	18	15	2	1	43	13	+30	32	1957 Primera División
2	Unión América	18	11	2	5	44	23	+21	24	
3	Unidad Vecinal Nº3	18	10	2	6	40	29	+11	22	
4	Defensor Arica	18	9	3	6	34	27	+7	21	
5	Santiago Barranco	18	8	4	6	42	35	+7	20	
6	Juventud Gloria	18	8	3	7	32	39	−7	19	
7	Association Chorrillos	18	4	4	10	31	35	−4	12	
8	Atlético Lusitania	18	2	7	9	24	39	−15	11	
9	KDT Nacional	18	3	3	12	16	40	−24	9	
10	Unión Callao (R)	18	3	2	13	10	32	−22	8	1957 Liga Provincial del Callao

Source: Diario El Comercio, La Prensa and Crónica.
(C) Champions; (R) Relegated

== Results ==
Home \ Away	ACH	LUS	DAR	GLO	KDT	POR	SAN	UV3	AME	CAL
Association Chorrillos		2–2	3–0	1–2	2–1	0–1	2–2	2–1	5–5	0–2
Atlético Lusitania	3–3		2–2	2–4	1–1	1–4	2–0	3–2	0–4	W.O.
Defensor Arica	3–1	3–3		1–1	4–2	1–2	1–3	1–2	1–2	3–1
Juventud Gloria	W.O.	3–1	0–1		2–2	1–2	2–7	3–5	0–5	1–0
KDT Nacional	0–5	2–1	1–4	0–1		0–2	1–4	0–3	1–2	2–0
Porvenir Miraflores	3–0	2–1	0–1	6–2	2–0		1–1	3–0	1–0	W.O.
Santiago Barranco	4–2	2–0	0–3	3–3	2–0	0–6		2–3	3–2	2–1
Unidad Vecinal Nº3	3–2	0–0	2–3	3–2	1–2	2–4	2–2		2–0	6–1
Unión América	2–0	3–1	2–1	0–1	4–1	1–1	4–3	0–1		4–2
Unión Callao	1–0	1–1	0–1	0–4	0–0	1–3	W.O.	0–1	0–4	

Updated to match(es) played on 1956. Source: Diario El Comercio, La Prensa and Crónica.
Legend: Blue = home team win; Yellow = draw; Red = away team win.

== Triangular de Ascenso a Segunda División ==
Sport Dinámico, as champions of the 1956 Liga Provincial del Callao, Mariscal Castilla, as champions of the 1956 Liga Provincial de Lima, and Sport Almagro, as champions of the 1956 Liga de los Balnearios del Sur were supposed to play a final to determine promotion to the 1957 Segunda División.

=== Standings ===
Pos	Team	Pld	W	D	L	GF	GA	GD	Pts	Qualification or relegation	CAS	ALM	DIN
1	Mariscal Castilla	2	2	0	0	7	3	+4	4	1957 Segunda División		5–2	
2	Sport Almagro	2	1	0	1	4	6	−2	2				2–1
3	Sport Dinámico	2	0	0	2	2	4	−2	0		1–2		

Source: Diario El Comercio, La Prensa and Crónica.
Legend: Blue = home team win; Yellow = draw; Red = away team win.

=== Results ===
23 March 1957	Sport Almagro	2–1	Sport Dinámico

27 March 1957	Mariscal Castilla	5–2	Sport Almagro

2 April 1957	Mariscal Castilla	2–1	Sport Dinámico

Mariscal Castilla earned promotion to the 1957 Segunda División.

== See also ==
- 1956 Peruvian Primera División
