= 1957 Peruvian Primera División =

Peruvian Primera División
- Season: 1957
- Dates: 4 August 1957 – 5 January 1958
- Champions: Centro Iqueño (1st title)
- Runner up: Atlético Chalaco
- Relegated: Porvenir Miraflores
- Matches: 110
- Goals: 352 (3.2 per match)
- Top goalscorer: Daniel Ruiz (20 goals)

The 1957 season of the Peruvian Primera División, the top category of Peruvian football, was played by 10 teams. The national champions were Centro Iqueño.

== Competition format ==
At the end of the regular season (home and away matches) teams were split in 2 groups of 5 teams: top 5 played for the title and bottom 5 played for the relegation. Teams carried their regular season records and played an additional round (4 further matches).

== Teams ==
=== Team changes ===
Promoted from 1956 Segunda División	Relegated from 1956 Primera División
▲ Porvenir Miraflores (1st)	▼ Carlos Concha (10th)

=== Stadia locations ===
Team	City	Mannager
Alianza Lima	La Victoria, Lima	(Peru) Adelfo Magallanes
Atlético Chalaco	Callao	(Argentina) César Viccino
Centro Iqueño	Cercado de Lima	(Uruguay) Roberto Scarone
Ciclista Lima	Cercado de Lima	(Argentina) Luis López
Deportivo Municipal	Cercado de Lima	(Peru) Juan Valdivieso
Mariscal Sucre	La Victoria, Lima	(Peru) Agapito Perales
Porvenir Miraflores	Miraflores, Lima	(Peru) Juan Ulloa
Sport Boys	Callao	(Greece) Dan Georgiadis
Sporting Cristal	Rímac, Lima	(Chile) Luis Tirado
Universitario	Breña, Lima	(Peru) Arturo Fernández

== First Stage ==
=== Standings ===
Pos	Team	Pld	W	D	L	GF	GA	GD	Pts	Qualification or relegation
1	Alianza Lima	18	9	5	4	48	30	+18	23	Liguilla Final
2	Atlético Chalaco	18	8	5	5	27	20	+7	21	Liguilla Final
3	Sporting Cristal	18	8	5	5	27	20	+7	21	Liguilla Final
4	Centro Iqueño	18	6	7	5	27	19	+8	19	Liguilla Final
5	Universitario	18	6	7	5	38	31	+7	19	Liguilla Final
6	Deportivo Municipal	18	7	3	8	30	32	−2	17	Liguilla Descenso
7	Ciclista Lima	18	6	5	7	29	32	−3	17	Liguilla Descenso
8	Sport Boys	18	6	5	7	18	26	−8	17	Liguilla Descenso
9	Mariscal Sucre	18	4	6	8	20	30	−10	14	Liguilla Descenso
10	Porvenir Miraflores	18	4	4	10	17	41	−24	12	Liguilla Descenso

Updated to match(es) played on unknown. Source: Diario La Crónica 1957

=== Results ===
Home \ Away	ALI	CHA	IQU	CIC	MUN	MSU	POR	SBA	CRI	UNI
Alianza Lima		1–0	1–1	3–3	3–0	4–0	7–2	1–2	2–0	3–3
Atlético Chalaco	5–1		2–1	0–2	3–1	2–0	0–0	2–0	1–0	2–5
Centro Iqueño	0–0	2–1		1–1	2–1	0–0	5–0	0–0	0–0	0–3
Ciclista Lima	3–4	2–1	0–3		3–2	2–1	0–1	1–1	1–3	3–3
Deportivo Municipal	3–1	2–2	4–3	4–2		3–0	2–0	1–2	1–0	3–3
Mariscal Sucre	1–4	0–0	2–1	1–2	4–1		1–1	1–1	0–2	3–3
Porvenir Miraflores	2–7	1–2	1–5	1–0	1–0	0–0		0–0	2–3	1–2
Sport Boys	2–4	0–2	0–0	2–1	1–2	2–0	1–0		2–1	2–3
Sporting Cristal	2–1	2–2	2–1	1–1	0–0	0–3	4–1	4–0		2–1
Universitario	1–1	0–0	1–2	0–2	2–0	2–3	2–3	3–0	1–1	

Updated to match(es) played on 1957. Source: Diario El Comercio, La Prensa and Crónica.
Legend: Blue = home team win; Yellow = draw; Red = away team win.

== Liguilla Final ==
=== Standings ===
Pos	Team	Pld	W	D	L	GF	GA	GD	Pts	Qualification or relegation	IQU	CHA	ALI	UNI	CRI
1	Centro Iqueño (C)	22	10	7	5	38	23	+15	27	Champions		2–1		2–1	
2	Atlético Chalaco	22	10	5	7	32	26	+6	25				1–0		2–1
3	Alianza Lima	22	9	6	7	51	38	+13	24		1–4				2–3
4	Universitario	22	8	8	6	45	34	+11	24			3–1	0–0		
5	Sporting Cristal	22	9	5	8	32	30	+2	23		1–3			0–3	

Legend: Blue = home team win; Yellow = draw; Red = away team win.
(C) Champions

== Liguilla Descenso ==
=== Standings ===
Pos	Team	Pld	W	D	L	GF	GA	GD	Pts	Qualification or relegation	MUN	CIC	SBA	MSU	POR
1	Deportivo Municipal	22	9	5	8	42	36	+6	23				2–2	1–1	
2	Ciclista Lima	22	7	6	9	34	42	−8	20		0–5				3–3
3	Sport Boys	22	6	8	8	26	35	−9	20			0–1			3–3
4	Mariscal Sucre	22	5	9	8	27	36	−9	19			2–1	3–3		
5	Porvenir Miraflores (R)	22	4	7	11	25	52	−27	15	1958 Segunda División	1–4			1–1	

Legend: Blue = home team win; Yellow = draw; Red = away team win.
(R) Relegated

== Top scorers ==
Rank	Player	Club	Goals
1	(Peru) Daniel Ruiz	Universitario	20
2	(Argentina) Carlos Abel Linazza	Centro Iqueño	18
3	(Argentina) Gualberto Bianco	Ciclista Lima	14
4	(Peru) Faustino Delgado	Sporting Cristal	12
4	(Peru) Alberto Terry	Universitario	12
5	(Peru) Valeriano López	Alianza Lima	11
5	(Uruguay) Carlos Zunino	Sporting Cristal	11

== See also ==
- 1957 Campeonato de Apertura
- 1957 Peruvian Segunda División
