= 1965 Peruvian Segunda División =

Peruvian Segunda División
- Season: 1965
- Dates: 14 August 1965 – December 1965
- Champions: Mariscal Sucre
- Runner up: Íntimos de La Legua
- Relegated: Atlético Chalaco
- Matches: 90
- Goals: 306 (3.4 per match)

The 1965 Peruvian Segunda División, the second division of Peruvian football (soccer), was played by 10 teams. The tournament winner, Mariscal Sucre was promoted to the 1966 Torneo Descentralizado.

The entire tournament was played at the Estadio Fray Martín de Porres in Lima.

== Competition format ==
All teams faced each other in a double round-robin format, playing home and away matches. The team that accumulated the highest number of points at the end of the season was automatically crowned champion and promoted to the Peruvian Primera División, while the team with the fewest points was relegated to the Ligas Provinciales de Lima y Callao.

Two points were awarded for a win, one point for a draw, and no points for a loss.

== Teams ==
=== Team changes ===
Promoted from 1964 Cuadrangular de Ascenso	Promoted to 1965 Primera División	Relegated from 1964 Primera División	Relegated to 1965 Liga Provincial del Callao
▲ Atlético Sicaya (1st)	▲ Defensor Arica (1st)	▼KDT Nacional (10th)	▼ Unidad Vecinal Nº3 (10th)

=== Stadia and locations ===
Team	City
ADO	Callao
Atlético Chalaco	Callao
Atlético Lusitania	Cercado de Lima
Atlético Sicaya	Callao
Íntimos de La Legua	Callao
Juventud Gloria	Jesús María, Lima
KDT Nacional	Callao
Mariscal Sucre	La Victoria, Lima
Porvenir Miraflores	Miraflores, Lima
Unión América	Cercado de Lima

== League table ==
=== Standings ===
Pos	Team	Pld	W	D	L	GF	GA	GD	Pts	Qualification or relegation
1	Mariscal Sucre (C)	18	14	3	1	44	15	+29	31	1965 Primera División
2	Íntimos de La Legua	18	8	4	6	28	20	+8	20	
3	Juventud Gloria	18	7	4	7	33	34	−1	18	
4	Porvenir Miraflores	18	7	3	8	39	30	+9	17	
5	Atlético Lusitania	18	8	1	9	29	35	−6	17	
6	Atlético Sicaya	18	7	3	8	29	39	−10	17	
7	Unión América	18	7	2	9	32	38	−6	16	
8	ADO	18	4	7	7	26	28	−2	15	
9	KDT Nacional	18	5	5	8	22	35	−13	15	
10	Atlético Chalaco (R)	18	5	4	9	24	29	−5	14	1966 Liga Provincial del Callao

(C) Champions; (R) Relegated

== Results ==
Home \ Away	ADO	CHA	LUS	SIC	INT	JUV	KDT	MSU	POR	UAM
ADO		3–0	2–0	5–3	1–1	1–4	1–0	0–2	1–1	2–3
Atlético Chalaco	1–2		0–2	0–3	3–0	2–0	2–1	0–1	2–2	3–2
Atlético Lusitania	1–0	3–2		2–1	1–3	1–2	4–0	0–4	1–3	4–1
Atlético Sicaya	2–1	3–2	1–3		1–0	1–4	1–1	1–1	3–2	3–1
Íntimos de La Legua	3–1	1–1	4–1	4–1		1–1	2–1	1–2	1–0	2–0
Juventud Gloria	1–1	2–2	1–1	3–1	2–1		2–0	2–4	2–0	0–1
KDT Nacional	2–2	1–1	1–2	1–1	0–0	5–4		2–1	1–1	2–1
Mariscal Sucre	1–1	3–1	5–2	2–0	1–0	3–0	3–0		3–1	2–2
Porvenir Miraflores	3–2	2–0	4–1	7–0	0–2	2–1	1–3	2–4		7–1
Unión América	0–0	0–2	2–0	0–3	3–2	7–2	6–1	0–2	2–1	

Updated to match(es) played on 1965. Source: Diario El Comercio, La Prensa and Crónica.
Legend: Blue = home team win; Yellow = draw; Red = away team win.

== Cuadrangular de Ascenso a Segunda División ==
Atlético Barrio Frigorífico, as champions of the 1965 Liga Provincial del Callao; Atlético Banfield, as champions of the 1965 Liga Provincial del Lima; Association Chorrillos, as champions of the 1965 Liga de los Balnearios del Sur; and Racing San Isidro, as champions of the 1965 Liga Distrital de San Isidrio, were to compete in a final four (round-robin) to determine promotion to the 1966 Segunda División.

=== Standings ===
Pos	Team	Pld	W	D	L	GF	GA	GD	Pts	Qualification or relegation	RAC	BAN	BAR	ACH
1	Racing San Isidro	3	3	0	0	12	4	+8	6	1966 Segunda División			4–2	
2	Atlético Banfield	3	1	1	1	3	4	−1	3		1–3			
3	Atlético Barrio Frigorífico	3	0	2	1	4	6	−2	2			1–1		1–1
4	Association Chorrillos	3	0	1	2	2	7	−5	1		1–5	0–1		

Legend: Blue = home team win; Yellow = draw; Red = away team win.

Racing earned promotion to the 1966 Segunda División.

== See also ==
- 1965 Peruvian Primera División
- 1965 Torneo Relámpago
- 1965 Cuadrangular de Campeones Provincianos
