= 1960 Peruvian Primera División =

Peruvian Primera División
- Season: 1960
- Dates: 27 August 1960 – 18 December 1960
- Champions: Universitario (9th title)
- Runner up: Sport Boys
- Relegated: Mariscal Castilla
- 1961 Copa Libertadores: Universitario
- Matches: 90
- Goals: 336 (3.73 per match)
- Top goalscorer: Fernando Olaechea (18 goals)

The 1960 season of the Peruvian Primera División, or the Peruvian Football Championship, the top category of Peruvian football (soccer), was played by 10 teams. The champions were Universitario and Mariscal Castilla was relegated.

== Competition format ==
All teams faced each other in a double round-robin format, playing home and away matches. The team that accumulated the highest number of points at the end of the season was automatically crowned champion, while the team with the fewest points was relegated to the Peruvian Segunda División.

Two points were awarded for a win, one point for a draw, and no points for a loss.

The champions qualified for the 1961 Copa Libertadores, the first Copa Libertadores to have a Peruvian team participate.

== Teams ==
=== Team changes ===
Promoted from 1959 Segunda División	Relegated from 1959 Primera División
▲ Mariscal Sucre (1st)	▼ Unión América (10th)

=== Stadia locations ===
Team	City	Mannager
Alianza Lima	La Victoria, Lima	(Peru) Alfonso Huapaya
Atlético Chalaco	Callao	(Argentina) César Viccino
Centro Iqueño	Cercado de Lima	(Paraguay) Miguel Ortega
Ciclista Lima	Cercado de Lima	(Peru) Alejandro Heredia
Deportivo Municipal	Cercado de Lima	(Peru) Roberto Drago
Mariscal Castilla	Rímac, Lima	(Argentina) Luis López
Mariscal Sucre	La Victoria, Lima	(Peru) Juan Bulnes
Sport Boys	Callao	(Peru) Marcos Calderón
Sporting Cristal	Rímac, Lima	(Argentina) Carlos Peucelle
Universitario	Breña, Lima	(Peru) Segundo Castillo

== League table ==
=== Standings ===
Pos	Team	Pld	W	D	L	GF	GA	GD	Pts	Qualification or relegation
1	Universitario (C)	18	11	3	4	39	26	+13	25	1961 Copa Libertadores
2	Sport Boys	18	9	6	3	29	23	+6	24	
3	Sporting Cristal	18	9	4	5	37	26	+11	22	
4	Deportivo Municipal	18	9	3	6	47	33	+14	21	
5	Centro Iqueño	18	7	6	5	35	30	+5	20	
6	Alianza Lima	18	6	4	8	27	33	−6	16	
7	Atlético Chalaco	18	4	7	7	29	31	−2	15	
8	Mariscal Sucre	18	5	4	9	36	40	−4	14	
9	Ciclista Lima	18	5	4	9	24	40	−16	14	
10	Mariscal Castilla (R)	18	4	1	13	30	54	−24	9	1961 Segunda División

(C) Champions; (R) Relegated

== Results ==
Home \ Away	ALI	CHA	IQU	CIC	MUN	CMC	MSU	SBA	CRI	UNI
Alianza Lima		0–3	0–4	2–4	1–2	5–0	1–1	2–1	0–2	1–0
Atlético Chalaco	1–1		1–3	2–2	1–0	3–5	2–0	3–4	1–1	1–1
Centro Iqueño	2–2	1–1		1–0	1–1	4–2	4–4	0–1	3–2	2–1
Ciclista Lima	1–0	1–1	1–3		2–6	1–0	2–4	1–1	1–0	1–2
Deportivo Municipal	3–5	3–1	1–1	2–1		4–1	6–3	1–2	1–1	2–3
Mariscal Castilla	1–5	1–2	2–1	1–2	2–6		4–2	0–3	2–4	1–0
Mariscal Sucre	1–3	1–1	3–1	4–2	1–4	2–2		5–0	0–1	2–0
Sport Boys	0–0	2–1	1–1	5–2	1–3	2–1	1–0		2–2	1–1
Sporting Cristal	5–0	2–1	4–1	1–1	3–1	3–2	3–1	0–2		0–2
Universitario	2–1	3–1	3–1	4–3	4–0	5–3	3–2	0–0	5–3	

Updated to match(es) played on 1960. Source: Diario El Comercio, La Prensa and Crónica.
Legend: Blue = home team win; Yellow = draw; Red = away team win.

== Top scorers ==
Rank	Player	Club	Goals
1	(Peru) Fernando Olaechea	Centro Iqueño	18
2	(Peru) Sigifredo Vargas	Atlético Chalaco	15
3	(Peru) Daniel Ruiz	Universitario	14
4	(Peru) Óscar Montalvo	Deportivo Municipal	13
4	(Peru) Ángel Uribe	Universitario	13
5	(Peru) Faustino Delgado	Sporting Cristal	11

== See also ==
- 1960 Campeonato de Apertura
- 1960 Peruvian Segunda División
