= 1959 Peruvian Segunda División =

Peruvian Segunda División
- Season: 1959
- Dates: 20 June 1959 – 1 November 1959
- Champions: Mariscal Sucre
- Runner up: KDT Nacional
- Relegated: San Antonio Miraflores
- Matches: 90
- Goals: 285 (3.17 per match)
- Top goalscorer: Héctor Aliaga (15)

The 1959 Peruvian Segunda División, the second division of Peruvian football (soccer), was played by 10 teams. The tournament winner, Mariscal Sucre was promoted to the 1960 Peruvian Primera División.

== Competition format ==
All teams faced each other in a double round-robin format, playing home and away matches. The team that accumulated the highest number of points at the end of the season was automatically crowned champion and promoted to the Peruvian Primera División, while the team with the fewest points was relegated to the Ligas Provinciales de Lima y Callao.

Two points were awarded for a win, one point for a draw, and no points for a loss.

== Teams ==
=== Team changes ===
Promoted from 1958 Triangular de Ascenso	Promoted to 1959 Primera División	Relegated from 1958 Primera División	Relegated to 1959 Liga de los Balnearios del Sur
▲ San Antonio Miraflores (1st)	▲ Unión América (1st)	▼ Mariscal Sucre (10th)	▼ Association Chorrillos (10th)

=== Stadia and locations ===
Team	City
Carlos Concha	Callao
Defensor Arica	Breña, Lima
Defensor Lima	Cercado de Lima
Juventud Gloria	Cercado de Lima
KDT Nacional	Callao
Mariscal Sucre	La Victoria, Lima
Porvenir Miraflores	Miraflores, Lima
San Antonio Miraflores	Miraflores, Lima
Santiago Barranco	Barranco, Lima
Unidad Vecinal Nº3	Cercado de Lima

== League table ==
=== Standings ===
Pos	Team	Pld	W	D	L	GF	GA	GD	Pts	Qualification or relegation
1	Mariscal Sucre (C)	18	11	4	3	32	15	+17	26	1960 Primera División
2	KDT Nacional	18	10	4	4	30	16	+14	24	
3	Porvenir Miraflores	18	9	4	5	35	20	+15	22	
4	Juventud Gloria	18	8	4	6	33	26	+7	20	
5	Santiago Barranco	18	7	4	7	26	22	+4	18	
6	Carlos Concha	18	7	4	7	26	32	−6	18	
7	Defensor Lima	18	6	5	7	24	33	−9	17	
8	Unidad Vecinal Nº3	18	5	4	9	32	36	−4	14	
9	Defensor Arica	18	5	2	11	23	38	−15	12	
10	San Antonio Miraflores (R)	18	4	1	13	24	49	−25	9	1960 Liga de los Balnearios del Sur

(C) Champions; (R) Relegated

== Results ==
Home \ Away	CON	DAR	DLI	GLO	KDT	SUC	POR	ANT	SAN	UV3
Carlos Concha		2–1	2–1	1–5	1–0	0–3	1–1	4–0	1–3	2–2
Defensor Arica	1–2		0–1	3–0	1–2	2–2	2–1	4–2	0–3	0–5
Defensor Lima	0–3	3–1		2–0	1–1	0–2	2–2	2–1	3–2	2–2
Juventud Gloria	2–2	3–2	1–1		1–1	2–2	0–1	2–1	3–1	5–0
KDT Nacional	2–0	4–0	2–1	0–3		0–1	1–0	1–2	3–1	3–0
Mariscal Sucre	1–0	1–2	5–1	2–0	2–3		0–0	3–0	2–1	1–0
Porvenir Miraflores	2–3	3–0	5–0	3–1	0–1	0–0		6–2	1–0	4–1
San Antonio Miraflores	2–2	2–1	1–3	1–2	1–5	1–2	2–3		2–1	3–1
Santiago Barranco	2–0	1–1	0–0	1–2	0–0	2–1	3–0	1–0		1–1
Unidad Vecinal Nº3	3–1	1–2	2–1	2–1	1–1	1–2	1–3	7–1	2–3	

Updated to match(es) played on 1959. Source: Diario El Comercio, La Prensa and Crónica.
Legend: Blue = home team win; Yellow = draw; Red = away team win.

== Triangular de Ascenso a Segunda División ==
Sport Dinámico, as champions of the 1959 Liga Provincial del Callao, Combinado Rímac, as champions of the 1959 Liga Provincial de Lima, and Alianza Chorrillos, as champions of the 1959 Liga de los Balnearios del Sur were supposed to play a final to determine promotion to the 1960 Segunda División.

=== Standings ===
Pos	Team	Pld	W	D	L	GF	GA	GD	Pts	Qualification or relegation	ALI	DIN	COM
1	Alianza Chorrillos	2	2	0	0	4	2	+2	4	1960 Segunda División		2–1	
2	Sport Dinámico	2	1	0	1	4	3	+1	2				3–1
3	Combinado Rímac	2	0	0	2	2	5	−3	0		1–2		

Source: Diario El Comercio, La Prensa and Crónica.
Legend: Blue = home team win; Yellow = draw; Red = away team win.

=== Results ===
9 March 1960	Combinado Rímac	1–2	Alianza Chorrillos

16 March 1960	Sport Dímanico	3–1	Combinado Rímac

23 March 1960	Alianza Chorrillos	2–1	Sport Dinámico

Alianza Chorrillos earned promotion to the 1960 Segunda División.

== See also ==
- 1959 Peruvian Primera División
