= 1966 Peruvian Segunda División =

Peruvian Segunda División
- Season: 1966
- Dates: 3 July 1966 – 6 November 1966
- Champions: Porvenir Miraflores
- Runner up: Racing San Isidro
- Relegated: Atlético Lusitania
- Matches: 92
- Goals: 252 (2.74 per match)

The 1966 Peruvian Segunda División, the second division of Peruvian football (soccer), was played by 10 teams. The tournament winner, Porvenir Miraflores was promoted to the 1967 Torneo Descentralizado.

The entire tournament was played at the Estadio Fray Martín de Porres in Lima.

== Competition format ==
All teams faced each other in a double round-robin format, playing home and away matches. The team that accumulated the highest number of points at the end of the season was automatically crowned champion and promoted to the Peruvian Primera División, while the team with the fewest points was relegated to the Ligas Provinciales de Lima y Callao.

Two points were awarded for a win, one point for a draw, and no points for a loss.

== Teams ==
=== Team changes ===
Promoted from 1965 Cuadrangular de Ascenso	Promoted to 1966 Primera División	Relegated from 1965 Primera División	Relegated to 1966 Liga Provincial del Callao
▲ Racing San Isidro (1st)	▲ Mariscal Sucre (1st)	▼ Ciclista Lima (10th)	▼ Atlético Chalaco (10th)

=== Stadia and locations ===
Team	City
ADO	Callao
Atlético Lusitania	Cercado de Lima
Atlético Sicaya	Callao
Ciclista Lima	Cercado de Lima
Íntimos de La Legua	Callao
Juventud Gloria	Jesús María, Lima
KDT Nacional	Callao
Porvenir Miraflores	Miraflores, Lima
Racing San Isidro	San Isidro, Lima
Unión América	Cercado de Lima

== League table ==
=== Standings ===
Pos	Team	Pld	W	D	L	GF	GA	GD	Pts	Qualification or relegation
1	Porvenir Miraflores (C)	18	12	2	4	26	10	+16	26	1967 Torneo Descentralizado
2	Racing San Isidro	18	8	4	6	21	18	+3	20	
3	Íntimos de La Legua	18	8	3	7	26	26	0	19	
4	ADO	18	7	4	7	25	28	−3	18	
5	Unión América	18	7	4	7	23	24	−1	18	
6	Ciclista Lima	18	7	3	8	29	24	+5	17	
7	KDT Nacional	18	7	2	9	26	28	−2	16	
8	Atlético Sicaya	18	6	4	8	26	33	−7	16	
9	Juventud Gloria (O)	18	6	3	9	21	23	−2	15	Relegation play-off
10	Atlético Lusitania (R)	18	6	3	9	19	28	−9	15	Relegation play-off

(C) Champions; (O) Play-off winners; (R) Relegated

== Results ==
Home \ Away	ADO	LUS	SIC	CIC	INT	JUV	KDT	POR	RAC	UAM
ADO		2–1	5–1	2–1	2–3	0–0	1–2	1–0	1–0	2–1
Atlético Lusitania	2–1		2–1	2–2	0–0	1–0	0–1	2–1	1–4	1–0
Atlético Sicaya	2–2	3–2		1–0	3–0	4–2	0–0	1–3	1–2	2–1
Ciclista Lima	4–1	1–2	3–1		3–0	1–2	3–2	0–1	2–0	0–1
Íntimos de La Legua	5–1	1–0	4–3	2–2		0–1	2–1	1–2	0–1	2–0
Juventud Gloria	1–2	4–0	1–2	1–3	1–0		3–1	0–1	1–1	1–0
KDT Nacional	3–1	3–2	1–1	3–1	1–2	3–2		0–3	3–0	0–2
Porvenir Miraflores	1–0	2–0	1–0	1–0	3–0	0–0	2–1		1–1	3–0
Racing San Isidro	0–0	1–0	4–0	1–2	0–0	1–0	1–0	1–0		1–3
Unión América	1–1	1–1	0–0	1–1	2–4	3–1	2–1	2–1	3–2	

Updated to match(es) played on 1966. Source: Diario El Comercio, La Prensa and Crónica.
Legend: Blue = home team win; Yellow = draw; Red = away team win.

== Relegation play-off ==
30 October 1966	Juventud Gloria	4–2	Atlético Lusitania	Estadio San Martín de Porres, Lima
15:30	Emilio Sáenz 15'; Humberto Magallanes 57' 87'; Eulogio Magallanes 63'		Romulo Franco 50'; José Sáenz 70' (pen.)

6 November 1966	Atlético Lusitania	0–4	Juventud Gloria	Estadio Nacional, Lima
			Julio Miranda 36' 82' 87'; Humberto Magallanes 39'

== Cuadrangular de Ascenso a Segunda División ==
Atlético Chalaco, as champions of the 1966 Liga Provincial del Callao; Independiente Sacachispas, as champions of the 1966 Liga Provincial del Lima; Unión Buenos Aires Chorrillos, as champions of the 1966 Liga de los Balnearios del Sur; and Deportivo Bancoper, as champions of the 1966 Liga Distrital de San Isidrio, were to compete in a final four (round-robin) to determine promotion to the 1967 Segunda División.

=== Standings ===
Pos	Team	Pld	W	D	L	GF	GA	GD	Pts	Qualification or relegation	IND	BAN	CHA	UBA
1	Independiente Sacachispas	3	2	1	0	4	1	+3	5	1967 Segunda División		2–0	1–1	
2	Deportivo Bancoper	3	2	0	1	5	2	+3	4					4–0
3	Atlético Chalaco	3	1	1	1	7	3	+4	3			0–1		6–1
4	Unión Buenos Aires Chorrillos	3	0	0	3	1	11	−10	0		0–1			

Legend: Blue = home team win; Yellow = draw; Red = away team win.

=== Results ===
26 March 1967	Atlético Chalaco	0–1	Deportivo Bancoper

26 March 1967	Unión Buenos Aires Chorrillos	0–1	Independiente Sacachispas

2 April 1967	Deportivo Bancoper	4–0	Unión Buenos Aires Chorrillos

2 April 1967	Independiente Sacachispas	1–1	Atlético Chalaco

9 April 1967	Independiente Sacachispas	2–0	Deportivo Bancoper

9 April 1967	Atlético Chalaco	6–1	Unión Buenos Aires Chorrillos

Independiente Sacachispas earned promotion to the 1967 Segunda División.

== See also ==
- 1966 Torneo Descentralizado
