= 1957 Peruvian Segunda División =

Peruvian Segunda División
- Season: 1957
- Dates: 2 October 1957 – 13 April 1958
- Champions: Mariscal Castilla
- Runner up: Carlos Concha
- Relegated: Atlético Lusitania
- Matches: 91
- Goals: 331 (3.64 per match)

The 1957 Peruvian Segunda División, the second division of Peruvian football (soccer), was played by 10 teams. The tournament winner, Mariscal Castilla was promoted to the 1958 Peruvian Primera División.

== Competition format ==
All teams faced each other in a double round-robin format, playing home and away matches. The team that accumulated the highest number of points at the end of the season was automatically crowned champion and promoted to the Peruvian Primera División, while the team with the fewest points was relegated to the Ligas Provinciales de Lima y Callao.

Two points were awarded for a win, one point for a draw, and no points for a loss.

== Teams ==
=== Team changes ===
Promoted from 1956 Triangular de Ascenso	Promoted to 1957 Primera División	Relegated from 1956 Primera División	Relegated to 1957 Liga Provincial del Callao
▲ Mariscal Castilla (1st)	▲ Porvenir Miraflores (1st)	▼ Carlos Concha (10th)	▼ Unión Callao (10th)

=== Stadia and locations ===
Team	City
Association Chorrillos	Chorrillos, Lima
Atlético Lusitania	Cercado de Lima
Carlos Concha	Callao
Defensor Arica	Breña, Lima
Juventud Gloria	Cercado de Lima
KDT Nacional	Callao
Mariscal Castilla	Rímac, Lima
Santiago Barranco	Barranco, Lima
Unidad Vecinal Nº3	Cercado de Lima
Unión América	Cercado de Lima

== League table ==
=== Standings ===
Pos	Team	Pld	W	D	L	GF	GA	GD	Pts	Qualification or relegation
1	Mariscal Castilla (C)	18	11	4	3	51	23	+28	26	1958 Primera División
2	Carlos Concha	18	10	4	4	40	28	+12	24	
3	Juventud Gloria	18	7	5	6	34	27	+7	19	
4	Santiago Barranco	18	7	5	6	26	29	−3	19	
5	KDT Nacional	18	7	4	7	30	32	−2	18	
6	Unión América	18	7	2	9	32	40	−8	16	
7	Association Chorrillos	18	7	2	9	30	41	−11	16	
8	Unidad Vecinal Nº3	18	6	3	9	30	37	−7	15	
9	Defensor Arica (O)	18	5	4	9	29	35	−6	14	Relegation play-off
10	Atlético Lusitania (R)	18	5	4	9	26	36	−10	14	Relegation play-off

(C) Champions; (O) Play-off winners; (R) Relegated

== Results ==
Home \ Away	ACH	LUS	CON	DAR	GLO	KDT	CAS	SAN	UV3	AME
Association Chorrillos		2–1	0–2	2–1	2–1	2–0	3–9	5–2	2–1	2–2
Atlético Lusitania	0–3		1–0	4–2	2–3	2–1	1–3	4–0	1–3	3–2
Carlos Concha	1–0	1–1		3–2	2–2	2–1	2–4	3–1	4–3	2–0
Defensor Arica	4–1	1–1	2–2		0–0	2–2	0–3	2–1	2–1	3–2
Juventud Gloria	3–0	3–0	0–3	3–2		1–2	1–1	0–0	4–0	3–1
KDT Nacional	3–2	4–0	0–4	3–2	1–0		1–1	1–2	0–0	3–1
Mariscal Castilla	1–1	3–1	5–2	2–2	2–1	3–1		0–1	5–1	3–0
Santiago Barranco	2–0	1–1	3–3	2–1	2–2	3–3	2–0		1–2	1–0
Unidad Vecinal Nº3	3–1	2–2	1–3	1–0	5–2	1–3	3–1	0–1		3–3
Unión América	5–2	2–1	2–1	2–1	2–5	4–1	0–5	2–1	2–0	

Updated to match(es) played on 1957. Source: Diario El Comercio, La Prensa and Crónica.
Legend: Blue = home team win; Yellow = draw; Red = away team win.

== Relegation play-off ==
13 April 1958	Defensor Arica	2–1	Atlético Lusitania

== Triangular de Ascenso a Segunda División ==
Sport Dinámico, as champions of the 1957 Liga Provincial del Callao, Defensor Lima, as champions of the 1957 Liga Provincial de Lima, and Defensor Espinar, as champions of the 1957 Liga de los Balnearios del Sur were supposed to play a final to determine promotion to the 1958 Segunda División.

=== Standings ===
Pos	Team	Pld	W	D	L	GF	GA	GD	Pts	Qualification or relegation	DEF	DIN	ESP
1	Defensor Lima	2	1	1	0	4	3	+1	3	1958 Segunda División		3–3	
2	Sport Dinámico	2	0	2	0	5	5	0	2				2–2
3	Defensor Espinar	2	0	1	1	2	3	−1	1		0–1		

Source: Diario El Comercio, La Prensa and Crónica.
Legend: Blue = home team win; Yellow = draw; Red = away team win.

=== Results ===
26 February 1958	Sport Dinámico	2–2	Defensor Espinar

6 March 1958	Sport Dinámico	3–3	Defensor Lima

13 April 1958	Defensor Lima	1–0	Defensor Espinar

Defensor Lima earned promotion to the 1958 Segunda División.

== See also ==
- 1957 Peruvian Primera División
