= 1956 Peruvian Primera División =

Peruvian Primera División
- Season: 1956
- Dates: 5 August 1956 – 8 December 1956
- Champions: Sporting Cristal (1st title)
- Runner up: Alianza Lima
- Relegated: Carlos Concha
- Matches: 90
- Goals: 299 (3.32 per match)
- Top goalscorer: Daniel Ruiz (16 goals)

The 1956 season of the Peruvian Primera División, the top category of Peruvian football, was played by 10 teams. The national champions were Sporting Cristal.

== Competition format ==
All teams faced each other in a double round-robin format, playing home and away matches. The team that accumulated the highest number of points at the end of the season was automatically crowned champion, while the team with the fewest points was relegated to the Peruvian Segunda División.

Two points were awarded for a win, one point for a draw, and no points for a loss.

== Teams ==
=== Team changes ===
Promoted from 1955 Segunda División	Relegated from 1955 Primera División
▲ Carlos Concha (1st)	▼ Unión Callao (10th)

=== Stadia locations ===
Team	City	Mannager
Alianza Lima	La Victoria, Lima	(Peru) Adelfo Magallanes
Atlético Chalaco	Callao	(Peru) Carlos Torres
Carlos Concha	Callao	(Argentina) Filpo Núñez
Centro Iqueño	Cercado de Lima	(Uruguay) Roberto Scarone
Ciclista Lima	Cercado de Lima	(Paraguay) Delfín Benítez Cáceres
Deportivo Municipal	Cercado de Lima	(Peru) Juan Valdivieso
Mariscal Sucre	La Victoria, Lima	(Peru) Alfonso Huapaya
Sport Boys	Callao	(Peru) Marcos Calderón
Sporting Cristal	Rímac, Lima	(Chile) Luis Tirado
Universitario	Breña, Lima	(Peru) Arturo Fernández

== League table ==
=== Standings ===
Pos	Team	Pld	W	D	L	GF	GA	GD	Pts	Qualification or relegation
1	Sporting Cristal (C)	18	13	3	2	43	19	+24	29	Champions
2	Alianza Lima	18	11	5	2	42	24	+18	27	
3	Deportivo Municipal	18	8	4	6	32	30	+2	20	
4	Universitario	18	7	4	7	34	34	0	18	
5	Sport Boys	18	5	6	7	32	26	+6	16	
6	Centro Iqueño	18	6	3	9	23	28	−5	15	
7	Mariscal Sucre	18	4	6	8	22	26	−4	14	
8	Ciclista Lima	18	6	2	10	24	34	−10	14	
9	Atlético Chalaco	18	5	4	9	24	40	−16	14	
10	Carlos Concha (R)	18	5	3	10	23	38	−15	13	1957 Segunda División

(C) Champions; (R) Relegated

== Results ==
Home \ Away	ALI	CHA	CAR	IQU	CIC	MUN	MSU	SBA	CRI	UNI
Alianza Lima		5–1	1–1	2–0	5–0	4–2	1–1	0–4	2–1	3–3
Atlético Chalaco	2–3		4–2	2–1	0–0	2–2	2–1	0–0	1–2	2–2
Carlos Concha	0–4	4–1		1–0	4–2	2–3	2–1	1–1	0–2	3–0
Centro Iqueño	1–1	1–2	2–0		3–2	1–0	1–1	2–5	2–3	2–0
Ciclista Lima	0–2	4–1	2–0	1–0		4–1	0–0	1–2	1–4	2–1
Deportivo Municipal	2–3	2–0	1–1	2–1	2–1		3–2	2–0	1–1	3–1
Mariscal Sucre	1–1	3–0	4–1	0–1	1–3	2–1		2–0	1–3	2–2
Sport Boys	1–2	2–3	4–0	1–1	3–0	1–1	0–0		2–2	3–4
Sporting Cristal	2–0	3–1	4–0	4–2	3–0	2–1	3–0	2–1		2–2
Universitario	2–3	3–0	2–1	1–2	2–1	2–3	2–0	3–2	2–0	

Updated to match(es) played on 1956. Source: Diario El Comercio, La Prensa and Crónica.
Legend: Blue = home team win; Yellow = draw; Red = away team win.

== Top scorers ==
Rank	Player	Club	Goals
1	(Peru) Daniel Ruiz	Universitario	16
2	(Peru) Valeriano López	Alianza Lima	15
3	(Peru) Emilio Salinas	Alianza Lima Lima	13
4	(Peru) Faustino Delgado	Sporting Cristal	12
5	(Peru) Eddie Chiok	Sport Boys	11
5	(Peru) Rolando Rodrich	Universitario	11

== See also ==
- 1956 Campeonato de Apertura
- 1956 Peruvian Segunda División
- 1956 Torneo Relámpago
