= 1958 Peruvian Segunda División =

Peruvian Segunda División
- Season: 1958
- Dates: 6 September 1958 – 18 January 1959
- Champions: Unión América
- Runner up: Porvenir Miraflores
- Relegated: Association Chorrillos
- Matches: 91
- Goals: 313 (3.44 per match)

The 1958 Peruvian Segunda División, the second division of Peruvian football (soccer), was played by 10 teams. The tournament winner, Unión América was promoted to the 1959 Peruvian Primera División.

== Competition format ==
All teams faced each other in a double round-robin format, playing home and away matches. The team that accumulated the highest number of points at the end of the season was automatically crowned champion and promoted to the Peruvian Primera División, while the team with the fewest points was relegated to the Ligas Provinciales de Lima y Callao.

Two points were awarded for a win, one point for a draw, and no points for a loss.

== Teams ==
=== Team changes ===
Promoted from 1957 Triangular de Ascenso	Promoted to 1958 Primera División	Relegated from 1957 Primera División	Relegated to 1958 Liga Provincial de Lima
▲ Defensor Lima (1st)	▲ Mariscal Castilla (1st)	▼ Porvenir Miraflores (10th)	▼ Atlético Lusitania (10th)

=== Stadia and locations ===
Team	City
Association Chorrillos	Chorrillos, Lima
Carlos Concha	Callao
Defensor Arica	Breña, Lima
Defensor Lima	Cercado de Lima
Juventud Gloria	Cercado de Lima
KDT Nacional	Callao
Porvenir Miraflores	Miraflores, Lima
Santiago Barranco	Barranco, Lima
Unidad Vecinal Nº3	Cercado de Lima
Unión América	Cercado de Lima

== League table ==
=== Standings ===
Pos	Team	Pld	W	D	L	GF	GA	GD	Pts	Promotion or relegation
1	Porvenir Miraflores	18	14	1	3	51	23	+28	29	Title Play-off
2	Unión América (C, O)	18	14	1	3	38	19	+19	29	Title Play-off
3	Carlos Concha	18	9	4	5	38	27	+11	22	
4	Juventud Gloria	18	9	2	7	33	26	+7	20	
5	KDT Nacional	18	5	5	8	26	32	−6	15	
6	Santiago Barranco	18	4	6	8	27	32	−5	14	
7	Unidad Vecinal Nº3	18	5	3	10	27	37	−10	13	
8	Defensor Lima	18	5	3	10	21	36	−15	13	
9	Defensor Arica	18	5	3	10	27	43	−16	13	
10	Association Chorrillos (R)	18	4	4	10	22	40	−18	12	1959 Liga de los Balnearios del Sur

(C) Champions; (O) Play-off winners; (R) Relegated

== Results ==
Home \ Away	ACH	CON	DAR	DLI	GLO	KDT	POR	SAN	UV3	AME
Association Chorrillos		1–2	2–1	2–0	0–2	1–1	2–4	1–1	1–4	1–3
Carlos Concha	5–0		2–2	6–1	0–2	2–1	2–1	3–3	2–2	0–1
Defensor Arica	2–1	1–2		5–2	0–3	1–1	2–4	0–5	2–1	1–2
Defensor Lima	3–3	1–1	2–3		3–0	1–0	1–3	W.O.	1–0	0–0
Juventud Gloria	1–1	2–1	4–1	6–1		1–4	3–2	1–1	3–1	3–1
KDT Nacional	2–3	1–4	2–1	0–3	2–0		0–2	3–0	3–1	1–6
Porvenir Miraflores	4–0	4–0	6–1	2–0	2–0	1–1		1–0	4–1	2–1
Santiago Barranco	2–0	2–3	3–2	0–0	1–0	3–3	1–3		1–1	1–4
Unidad Vecinal Nº3	1–3	1–3	0–1	2–1	3–2	1–1	1–5	4–1		2–0
Unión América	2–0	1–0	2–1	2–0	2–1	1–0	4–1	3–2	3–1	

Updated to match(es) played on 1958. Source: Diario El Comercio, La Prensa and Crónica.
Legend: Blue = home team win; Yellow = draw; Red = away team win.

== Title Play-off ==
18 January 1959	Unión América	3–0	Porvenir Miraflores	Estadio Nacional, Lima

== Triangular de Ascenso a Segunda División ==
Sport Dinámico, as champions of the 1958 Liga Provincial del Callao, Atlético Lusitania, as champions of the 1958 Liga Provincial de Lima, and San Antonio Miraflores, as champions of the 1958 Liga de los Balnearios del Sur were supposed to play a final to determine promotion to the 1959 Segunda División.

=== Standings ===
Pos	Team	Pld	W	D	L	GF	GA	GD	Pts	Qualification or relegation	SAN	LUS	DIN
1	San Antonio Miraflores	2	1	1	0	3	2	+1	3	1959 Segunda División		1–1	
2	Atlético Lusitania	2	0	2	0	2	2	0	2				1–1
3	Sport Dinámico	2	0	1	1	2	3	−1	1		1–2		

Source: Diario El Comercio, La Prensa and Crónica.
Legend: Blue = home team win; Yellow = draw; Red = away team win.

=== Results ===
18 February 1959	Sport Dinámico	1–2	San Antonio Miraflores

22 February 1959	Atlético Lusitania	1–1	Sport Dinámico

25 February 1959	San Antonio Miraflores	1–1	Atlético Lusitania

San Antonio earned promotion to the 1959 Segunda División.

== See also ==
- 1958 Peruvian Primera División
