= 1967 Peruvian Segunda División =

Peruvian Segunda División
- Season: 1967
- Dates: 1 July 1967 – 5 November 1967
- Champions: KDT Nacional
- Runner up: Independiente Sacachispas
- Relegated: Íntimos de la Legua
- Matches: 90
- Goals: 245 (2.72 per match)

The 1967 Peruvian Segunda División, the second division of Peruvian football (soccer), was played by 10 teams. The tournament winner, KDT Nacional was promoted to the 1968 Torneo Descentralizado.

The entire tournament was played at the Estadio Fray Martín de Porres in Lima.

== Competition format ==
All teams faced each other in a double round-robin format, playing home and away matches. The team that accumulated the highest number of points at the end of the season was automatically crowned champion and promoted to the Peruvian Primera División, while the team with the fewest points was relegated to the Ligas Provinciales de Lima y Callao.

Two points were awarded for a win, one point for a draw, and no points for a loss.

== Teams ==
=== Team changes ===
Promoted from 1966 Cuadrangular de Ascenso	Promoted to 1967 Primera División	Relegated from 1966 Primera División	Relegated to 1967 Liga Provincial de Lima
▲ Independiente Sacachispas (1st)	▲ Porvenir Miraflores (1st)	▼ Carlos Concha (10th)	▼ Atlético Lusitania (10th)

=== Stadia and locations ===
Team	City
ADO	Callao
Atlético Sicaya	Callao
Carlos Concha	Callao
Ciclista Lima	Cercado de Lima
Independiente Sacachispas	Cercado de Lima
Íntimos de La Legua	Callao
Juventud Gloria	Jesús María, Lima
KDT Nacional	Callao
Racing San Isidro	San Isidro, Lima
Unión América	Cercado de Lima

== League table ==
=== Standings ===
Pos	Team	Pld	W	D	L	GF	GA	GD	Pts	Qualification or relegation
1	KDT Nacional (C)	18	10	5	3	35	22	+13	25	1968 Torneo Descentralizado
2	Independiente Sacachispas	18	9	6	3	28	15	+13	24	
3	ADO	18	6	9	3	25	25	0	21	
4	Ciclista Lima	18	6	8	4	20	17	+3	20	
5	Carlos Concha	18	6	7	5	27	26	+1	19	
6	Racing San Isidro	18	7	4	7	23	19	+4	18	
7	Atlético Sicaya	18	4	7	7	27	33	−6	15	
8	Unión América	18	4	6	8	21	31	−10	14	
9	Juventud Gloria	18	3	7	8	19	25	−6	13	
10	Íntimos de La Legua (R)	18	2	7	9	20	32	−12	11	1968 Liga Provincial del Callao

(C) Champions; (R) Relegated

== Results ==
Home \ Away	ADO	SIC	CAR	CIC	IND	INT	JUV	KDT	RAC	UAM
ADO		1–1	3–2	1–2	0–0	1–1	3–2	3–2	1–0	1–0
Atlético Sicaya	5–5		1–4	3–1	3–2	2–2	1–0	1–1	1–2	0–2
Carlos Concha	4–2	0–0		0–0	0–0	1–0	1–1	3–0	3–2	2–2
Ciclista Lima	0–0	2–2	2–0		3–2	2–0	0–0	1–2	1–1	2–1
Independiente Sacachispas	1–1	1–0	2–0	1–0		2–0	1–1	1–2	2–0	3–1
Íntimos de La Legua	1–1	1–1	3–1	1–1	1–1		1–1	2–4	1–2	3–1
Juventud Gloria	0–0	1–2	0–2	2–1	2–3	2–0		2–3	2–1	1–1
KDT Nacional	4–1	1–0	5–1	0–0	1–1	3–1	3–1		0–0	2–1
Racing San Isidro	0–0	3–1	2–2	0–1	0–1	4–2	1–0	1–0		0–1
Unión América	0–1	4–3	1–1	1–1	0–4	2–0	1–1	2–2	0–4	

Updated to match(es) played on 1967. Source: Diario El Comercio, La Prensa and Crónica.
Legend: Blue = home team win; Yellow = draw; Red = away team win.

== Cuadrangular de Ascenso a Segunda División ==
Deportivo SIMA, as champions of the 1967 Liga Provincial del Callao; Estudiantes San Roberto, as champions of the 1967 Liga Provincial del Lima; Sport Huáscar Barranco, as champions of the 1967 Liga de los Balnearios del Sur; and Deportivo Nacional, as champions of the 1967 Liga Distrital de San Isidrio, were to compete in a final four (round-robin) to determine promotion to the 1968 Segunda División.

=== Standings ===
Pos	Team	Pld	W	D	L	GF	GA	GD	Pts	Qualification or relegation	SIM	NAC	EST	HUA
1	Deportivo SIMA	3	3	0	0	12	4	+8	6	1968 Segunda División				6–0
2	Deportivo Nacional	3	2	0	1	8	6	+2	4		1–4			3–1
3	Estudiantes San Roberto	3	1	0	2	3	7	−4	2		0–2	1–4		
4	Sport Huáscar Barranco	3	0	0	3	2	11	−9	0				1–2	

Legend: Blue = home team win; Yellow = draw; Red = away team win.

Deportivo SIMA earned promotion to the 1968 Segunda División.

== See also ==
- 1967 Torneo Descentralizado
- 1967 Copa Perú
