= 1959 Peruvian Primera División =

Peruvian Primera División
- Season: 1959
- Dates: 11 July 1959 – 27 December 1959
- Champions: Universitario (8th title)
- Runner up: Sport Boys
- Relegated: Unión América
- Matches: 110
- Goals: 386 (3.51 per match)
- Top goalscorer: Daniel Ruiz (28 goals)

The 1959 season of the Peruvian Primera División, the top category of Peruvian football, was played by 10 teams. The national champions were Universitario.

== Competition format ==
At the end of the regular season (home and away matches) teams were split in 2 groups of 5 teams: top 5 played for the title and bottom 5 played for the relegation. Teams carried their regular season records and played an additional round (4 further matches).

== Teams ==
=== Team changes ===
Promoted from 1958 Segunda División	Relegated from 1958 Primera División
▲ Unión América (1st)	▼ Mariscal Sucre (10th)

=== Stadia locations ===
Team	City	Mannager
Alianza Lima	La Victoria, Lima	(Uruguay) Roberto Scarone
Atlético Chalaco	Callao	(Greece) Dan Georgiadis
Centro Iqueño	Cercado de Lima	(Paraguay) Miguel Ortega
Ciclista Lima	Cercado de Lima	(Peru) Alejandro Heredia
Deportivo Municipal	Cercado de Lima	(Peru) Roberto Drago
Mariscal Castilla	Rímac, Lima	(Peru) Pedro Valdivieso
Sport Boys	Callao	(Peru) Marcos Calderón
Sporting Cristal	Rímac, Lima	(Argentina) César Viccino
Unión América	Cercado de Lima	(Peru) José Chiarella
Universitario	Breña, Lima	(Peru) Segundo Castillo

== First Stage ==
=== Standings ===
Pos	Team	Pld	W	D	L	GF	GA	GD	Pts	Qualification or relegation
1	Universitario	18	14	1	3	43	19	+24	29	Liguilla Final
2	Centro Iqueño	18	10	4	4	34	27	+7	24	Liguilla Final
3	Sport Boys	18	10	2	6	28	18	+10	22	Liguilla Final
4	Deportivo Municipal	18	6	6	6	26	24	+2	18	Liguilla Final
5	Sporting Cristal	18	7	3	8	30	31	−1	17	Liguilla Final
6	Ciclista Lima	18	6	5	7	35	34	+1	17	Liguilla Descenso
7	Alianza Lima	18	5	4	9	30	33	−3	14	Liguilla Descenso
8	Mariscal Castilla	18	4	6	8	27	34	−7	14	Liguilla Descenso
9	Atlético Chalaco	18	5	3	10	29	45	−16	13	Liguilla Descenso
10	Unión América	18	4	4	10	16	33	−17	12	Liguilla Descenso

Updated to match(es) played on unknown. Source:

=== Results ===
Home \ Away	ALI	CHA	IQU	CIC	MUN	CMC	SBA	CRI	AMÉ	UNI
Alianza Lima		1–0	3–1	8–3	1–1	4–0	0–2	1–1	0–2	2–3
Atlético Chalaco	2–1		2–3	3–2	2–1	4–2	2–0	1–5	1–1	3–4
Centro Iqueño	1–0	5–1		2–2	1–0	2–1	3–1	2–0	2–0	0–3
Ciclista Lima	2–1	2–2	5–0		2–2	6–2	1–1	0–1	3–0	2–1
Deportivo Municipal	1–1	5–1	1–1	2–0		2–1	0–1	2–3	1–1	2–0
Mariscal Castilla	4–1	3–1	2–2	0–0	1–1		0–2	2–0	4–0	0–1
Sport Boys	2–2	3–2	0–1	0–1	3–1	2–0		2–1	6–1	2–0
Sporting Cristal	3–4	2–1	3–3	4–3	0–1	2–2	1–0		0–2	1–3
Unión América	1–0	1–1	0–2	2–0	1–2	1–1	0–1	1–3		1–3
Universitario	4–0	4–0	3–1	3–1	4–1	2–2	1–0	1–0	3–1	

Updated to match(es) played on 1959. Source: Diario El Comercio, La Prensa and Crónica.
Legend: Blue = home team win; Yellow = draw; Red = away team win.

== Liguilla Final ==
=== Standings ===
Pos	Team	Pld	W	D	L	GF	GA	GD	Pts	Qualification or relegation	UNI	SBA	IQU	MUN	CRI
1	Universitario (C)	22	15	3	4	51	30	+21	33	Champions			1–5		3–2
2	Sport Boys	22	12	4	6	40	23	+17	28		1–1			7–2	
3	Centro Iqueño	22	11	5	6	43	36	+7	27			1–3		1–3	
4	Deportivo Municipal	22	7	8	7	36	37	−1	22		3–3				2–2
5	Sporting Cristal	22	7	6	9	37	39	−2	20			1–1	2–2		

Legend: Blue = home team win; Yellow = draw; Red = away team win.
(C) Champions

== Liguilla Descenso ==
=== Standings ===
Pos	Team	Pld	W	D	L	GF	GA	GD	Pts	Qualification or relegation	CIC	CMC	CHA	ALI	AMÉ
1	Ciclista Lima	22	7	6	9	46	45	+1	20				1–3		2–3
2	Mariscal Castilla	22	6	7	9	36	41	−5	19		2–2			3–2	
3	Atlético Chalaco	22	8	3	11	38	49	−11	19			2–1			4–1
4	Alianza Lima	22	7	4	11	38	42	−4	18		3–6		1–0		
5	Unión América (R)	22	5	4	13	21	44	−23	14	1960 Segunda División		1–3		0–2	

Legend: Blue = home team win; Yellow = draw; Red = away team win.
(R) Relegated

== Top scorers ==
Rank	Player	Club	Goals
1	(Peru) Daniel Ruiz	Universitario	28
2	(Peru) Faustino Delgado	Sporting Cristal	19
3	(Peru) Óscar Montalvo	Deportivo Municipal	14
4	(Argentina) Carlos Abel Linazza	Centro Iqueño	13
5	(Peru) Alberto Gallardo	Mariscal Castilla	12
5	(Peru) Juan Joya	Alianza Lima	12

== See also ==
- 1959 Campeonato de Apertura
- 1959 Peruvian Segunda División
- 1959 Torneo Hexagonal de Lima
