= 1960 Peruvian Segunda División =

Peruvian Segunda División
- Season: 1960
- Dates: 9 July 1960 – 13 November 1960
- Champions: Defensor Lima
- Runner up: Carlos Concha
- Relegated: Alianza Chorrillos
- Matches: 90
- Goals: 238 (2.64 per match)
- Top goalscorer: Manuel Ziani (9)

The 1960 Peruvian Segunda División, the second division of Peruvian football (soccer), was played by 10 teams. The tournament winner, Defensor Lima was promoted to the 1961 Peruvian Primera División.

== Competition format ==
All teams faced each other in a double round-robin format, playing home and away matches. The team that accumulated the highest number of points at the end of the season was automatically crowned champion and promoted to the Peruvian Primera División, while the team with the fewest points was relegated to the Ligas Provinciales de Lima y Callao.

Two points were awarded for a win, one point for a draw, and no points for a loss.

== Teams ==
=== Team changes ===
Promoted from 1959 Triangular de Ascenso	Promoted to 1959 Primera División	Relegated from 1959 Primera División	Relegated to 1960 Liga de los Balnearios del Sur
▲ Alianza Chorrillos (1st)	▲ Mariscal Sucre (1st)	▼ Unión América (10th)	▼ San Antonio (10th)

=== Stadia and locations ===
Team	City
Alianza Chorrillos	Chorrillos, Lima
Carlos Concha	Callao
Defensor Arica	Breña, Lima
Defensor Lima	Cercado de Lima
Juventud Gloria	Jesús María, Lima
KDT Nacional	Callao
Porvenir Miraflores	Miraflores, Lima
Santiago Barranco	Barranco, Lima
Unidad Vecinal Nº3	Cercado de Lima
Unión América	Cercado de Lima

== League table ==
=== Standings ===
Pos	Team	Pld	W	D	L	GF	GA	GD	Pts	Qualification or relegation
1	Defensor Lima (C)	18	11	5	2	24	15	+9	27	1961 Primera División
2	Carlos Concha	18	9	4	5	34	21	+13	22	
3	KDT Nacional	18	9	4	5	29	26	+3	22	
4	Santiago Barranco	18	7	7	4	30	22	+8	21	
5	Unión América	18	7	5	6	33	23	+10	19	
6	Unidad Vecinal Nº3	18	7	4	7	22	27	−5	18	
7	Porvenir Miraflores	18	5	7	6	23	22	+1	17	
8	Juventud Gloria	18	5	5	8	16	25	−9	15	
9	Defensor Arica	18	4	3	11	16	27	−11	11	
10	Alianza Chorrillos (R)	18	2	4	12	11	30	−19	8	1961 Liga de los Balnearios del Sur

Source: Diario La Crónica
(C) Champions; (R) Relegated

== Results ==
Home \ Away	ALI	CON	DAR	DLI	GLO	KDT	POR	SAN	UV3	AME
Alianza Chorrillos		0–3	2–1	0–1	1–3	2–1	1–1	1–1	1–1	0–1
Carlos Concha	4–0		4–0	3–1	5–1	4–1	2–0	0–4	2–2	1–2
Defensor Arica	2–0	1–2		0–2	0–1	1–1	3–0	0–1	0–2	1–1
Defensor Lima	2–1	1–1	2–1		0–0	3–2	0–0	4–1	1–1	1–0
Juventud Gloria	1–0	0–1	1–0	0–0		2–1	1–1	1–3	0–1	0–4
KDT Nacional	1–1	2–1	3–2	2–0	1–0		3–2	3–2	2–1	3–1
Porvenir Miraflores	1–0	0–0	3–0	0–2	0–0	3–1		3–0	4–0	2–2
Santiago Barranco	3–1	1–0	0–0	0–1	3–3	0–0	2–2		4–1	1–1
Unidad Vecinal Nº3	1–0	4–0	1–2	0–1	2–1	0–0	2–1	0–3		2–0
Unión América	3–0	1–1	1–2	3–4	2–1	1–2	4–0	1–1	5–1	

Updated to match(es) played on 1960. Source: Diario El Comercio, La Prensa and Crónica.
Legend: Blue = home team win; Yellow = draw; Red = away team win.

== Triangular de Ascenso a Segunda División ==
Telmo Carbajo, as champions of the 1960 Liga Provincial del Callao, Alianza Libertad, as champions of the 1960 Liga Provincial de Lima, and Association Chorrillos, as champions of the 1960 Liga de los Balnearios del Sur were supposed to play a final to determine promotion to the 1961 Segunda División.

=== Standings ===
Pos	Team	Pld	W	D	L	GF	GA	GD	Pts	Qualification or relegation	TEL	ACH	ALI
1	Telmo Carbajo	2	1	1	0	5	4	+1	3			2–2	
2	Association Chorrillos	2	1	1	0	4	3	+1	3	1961 Segunda División			2–1
3	Alianza Libertad	2	0	0	2	3	5	−2	0		2–3		

Source: Diario El Comercio, La Prensa and Crónica.
Legend: Blue = home team win; Yellow = draw; Red = away team win.

=== Title Play-off ===
Team 1	Agg.	Team 2	1st leg	2nd leg
Association Chorrillos	3–2	Telmo Carbajo	1–1	2–1

Association Chorrillos earned promotion to the 1961 Segunda División.

== See also ==
- 1960 Peruvian Primera División
- 1960 Torneo Relámpago
