= 1958 Peruvian Primera División =

Peruvian Primera División
- Season: 1958
- Dates: 6 July 1958 – 13 December 1958
- Champions: Sport Boys (5th title)
- Runner up: Atlético Chalaco
- Relegated: Mariscal Sucre
- Matches: 110
- Goals: 323 (2.94 per match)
- Top goalscorer: Juan Joya (17 goals)

The 1958 season of the Peruvian Primera División, the top category of Peruvian football, was played by 10 teams. The national champions were Sport Boys.

== Competition format ==
At the end of the regular season (home and away matches) teams were split in 2 groups of 5 teams: top 5 played for the title and bottom 5 played for the relegation. Teams carried their regular season records and played an additional round (4 further matches).

== Teams ==
=== Team changes ===
Promoted from 1957 Segunda División	Relegated from 1957 Primera División
▲ Mariscal Castilla (1st)	▼ Porvenir Miraflores (10th)

=== Stadia locations ===
Team	City	Mannager
Alianza Lima	La Victoria, Lima	(Uruguay) Roberto Scarone
Atlético Chalaco	Callao	(Argentina) Francisco Villegas
Centro Iqueño	Cercado de Lima	(Paraguay) Miguel Ortega
Ciclista Lima	Cercado de Lima	(Peru) Alejandro Heredia
Deportivo Municipal	Cercado de Lima	(Peru) Juan Valdivieso
Mariscal Castilla	Rímac, Lima	(Uruguay) Julio César Manisse
Mariscal Sucre	La Victoria, Lima	(Peru) Agapito Perales
Sport Boys	Callao	(Peru) Marcos Calderón
Sporting Cristal	Rímac, Lima	(Chile) Luis Tirado
Universitario	Breña, Lima	(Peru) Segundo Castillo

== First Stage ==
=== Standings ===
Pos	Team	Pld	W	D	L	GF	GA	GD	Pts	Qualification or relegation
1	Sport Boys	18	9	5	4	29	22	+7	23	Liguilla Final
2	Deportivo Municipal	18	9	2	7	28	25	+3	20	Liguilla Final
3	Atlético Chalaco	18	7	6	5	24	25	−1	20	Liguilla Final
4	Universitario	18	8	3	7	23	25	−2	19	Liguilla Final
5	Mariscal Castilla	18	8	3	7	25	29	−4	19	Liguilla Final
6	Centro Iqueño	18	8	2	8	31	28	+3	18	Liguilla Descenso
7	Alianza Lima	18	6	4	8	32	25	+7	16	Liguilla Descenso
8	Sporting Cristal	18	7	2	9	26	19	+7	16	Liguilla Descenso
9	Ciclista Lima	18	6	3	9	29	39	−10	15	Liguilla Descenso
10	Mariscal Sucre	18	5	4	9	23	33	−10	14	Liguilla Descenso

Updated to match(es) played on unknown. Source:

=== Results ===
Home \ Away	ALI	CHA	IQU	CIC	MUN	CMC	MSU	SBA	CRI	UNI
Alianza Lima		5–0	1–3	6–1	5–0	3–0	3–2	1–1	2–1	0–0
Atlético Chalaco	0–0		2–1	2–1	4–2	1–1	2–2	1–1	0–3	1–1
Centro Iqueño	1–0	2–3		2–1	0–0	1–2	0–2	2–0	1–1	1–3
Ciclista Lima	3–1	1–1	3–1		1–0	2–1	3–1	1–2	1–5	2–3
Deportivo Municipal	1–0	1–0	2–3	4–2		5–1	0–2	1–1	2–1	0–1
Mariscal Castilla	2–1	1–0	1–3	3–0	1–4		3–1	1–1	1–0	2–3
Mariscal Sucre	2–1	0–3	0–4	2–2	2–0	2–2		1–4	3–0	0–1
Sport Boys	3–2	3–0	3–2	2–1	1–3	1–2	1–1		1–0	3–0
Sporting Cristal	3–1	0–2	1–2	0–0	0–1	0–1	2–0	4–0		3–0
Universitario	1–1	0–2	3–2	3–4	0–1	1–0	2–0	0–1	1–2	

Updated to match(es) played on 1958. Source: Diario El Comercio, La Prensa and Crónica.
Legend: Blue = home team win; Yellow = draw; Red = away team win.

== Liguilla Final ==
=== Standings ===
Pos	Team	Pld	W	D	L	GF	GA	GD	Pts	Qualification or relegation	SBA	CHA	CMC	UNI	MUN
1	Sport Boys (C)	22	10	6	6	31	25	+6	26	Champions				0–1	1–1
2	Atlético Chalaco	22	9	7	6	29	29	0	25		0–1				3–2
3	Mariscal Castilla	22	10	4	8	29	33	−4	24		1–0	0–0			
4	Universitario	22	10	3	9	31	29	+2	23			1–2	1–2		
5	Deportivo Municipal	22	10	3	9	34	35	−1	23				3–1	0–5	

Updated to match(es) played on unknown. Source:
Legend: Blue = home team win; Yellow = draw; Red = away team win.
(C) Champions

=== Results ===
Deportivo Municipal	0–5	Universitario

16 November 1958	Mariscal Castilla	1–0	Sport Boys

Sport Boys	1–1	Deportivo Municipal

Universitario	1–2	Atlético Chalaco

Mariscal Castilla	0–0	Atlético Chalaco

Sport Boys	0–1	Universitario

Deportivo Municipal	3–1	Mariscal Castilla

7 December 1958	Atlético Chalaco	0–1	Sport Boys
			Teodoro Boluarte 89'	Attendance: 25,055; Referee: Arturo Yamasaki

Atlético Chalaco	3–2	Deportivo Municipal

Universitario	1–2	Mariscal Castilla

== Liguilla Descenso ==
=== Standings ===
Pos	Team	Pld	W	D	L	GF	GA	GD	Pts	Qualification or relegation	IQU	ALI	CRI	CIC	MSU
1	Centro Iqueño	22	10	3	9	37	32	+5	23				1–2		2–0
2	Alianza Lima	22	8	6	8	40	29	+11	22		1–1			3–1	
3	Sporting Cristal	22	9	3	10	35	26	+9	21			2–4		2–2	
4	Ciclista Lima	22	7	4	11	34	46	−12	18		1–2				1–0
5	Mariscal Sucre (R)	22	5	5	12	23	39	−16	15	1959 Segunda División		0–0	0–3		

Legend: Blue = home team win; Yellow = draw; Red = away team win.
(R) Relegated

== Top scorers ==
Rank	Player	Club	Goals
1	(Peru) Juan Joya	Alianza Lima	17
2	(Peru) Faustino Delgado	Sporting Cristal	14
2	(Argentina) Vicente Gambardella	Atlético Chalaco	14
3	(Peru) Daniel Ruiz	Universitario	12
3	(Peru) Juan Seminario	Deportivo Municipal	12
3	(Peru) Miguel Ángel Loayza	Ciclista Lima	12
4	(Peru) Alfredo Huaranga Daga	Centro Iqueño	11
5	(Uruguay) Carlos Zunino	Sporting Cristal	10
5	(Uruguay) Alberto Galeano	Sport Boys	10
5	(Peru) Emilio Salinas	Ciclista Lima	10

== See also ==
- 1958 Campeonato de Apertura
- 1958 Peruvian Segunda División
