= 1961 Peruvian Segunda División =

Peruvian Segunda División
- Season: 1961
- Dates: 10 August 1961 – 15 October 1961
- Champions: KDT Nacional
- Runner up: Association Chorrillos
- Relegated: Mariscal Castilla
- Matches: 90
- Goals: 313 (3.48 per match)
- Top goalscorer: Hugo Casas (14)

The 1961 Peruvian Segunda División, the second division of Peruvian football (soccer), was played by 10 teams. The tournament winner, KDT Nacional was promoted to the 1962 Peruvian Primera División.

The entire tournament was played at the Estadio Fray Martín de Porres in Lima.

== Competition format ==
All teams faced each other in a double round-robin format, playing home and away matches. The team that accumulated the highest number of points at the end of the season was automatically crowned champion and promoted to the Peruvian Primera División, while the team with the fewest points was relegated to the Ligas Provinciales de Lima y Callao.

Two points were awarded for a win, one point for a draw, and no points for a loss.

== Teams ==
=== Team changes ===
Promoted from 1960 Triangular de Ascenso	Promoted to 1961 Primera División	Relegated from 1960 Primera División	Relegated to 1961 Liga de los Balnearios del Sur
▲ Association Chorrillos (1st)	▲ Defensor Lima (1st)	▼ Mariscal Castilla (10th)	▼ Alianza Chorrillos (10th)

=== Stadia and locations ===
Team	City
Association Chorrillos	Chorrillos, Lima
Carlos Concha	Callao
Defensor Arica	Breña, Lima
Juventud Gloria	Jesús María, Lima
KDT Nacional	Callao
Mariscal Castilla	Rímac, Lima
Porvenir Miraflores	Miraflores, Lima
Santiago Barranco	Barranco, Lima
Unidad Vecinal Nº3	Cercado de Lima
Unión América	Cercado de Lima

== League table ==
=== Standings ===
Pos	Team	Pld	W	D	L	GF	GA	GD	Pts	Qualification or relegation
1	KDT Nacional (C)	18	12	3	3	32	19	+13	27	1962 Primera División
2	Association Chorrillos	18	10	4	4	36	24	+12	24	
3	Unidad Vecinal Nº3	18	11	1	6	35	25	+10	23	
4	Carlos Concha	18	7	5	6	34	29	+5	19	
5	Juventud Gloria	18	7	4	7	24	30	−6	18	
6	Defensor Arica	18	6	5	7	26	32	−6	17	
7	Porvenir Miraflores	18	7	2	9	28	29	−1	16	
8	Santiago Barranco	18	7	1	10	35	35	0	15	
9	Unión América	18	6	2	10	39	44	−5	14	
10	Mariscal Castilla (R)	18	3	3	12	24	42	−18	9	1962 Liga Provincial de Lima

(C) Champions; (R) Relegated

== Results ==
Home \ Away	ASS	CAR	DEF	JUV	KDT	MAR	POR	SAN	UVE	UAM
Association Chorrillos		2–1	1–1	4–0	0–1	3–2	2–0	3–0	3–2	1–4
Carlos Concha	1–1		2–3	3–0	1–1	3–2	2–1	3–1	1–0	5–3
Defensor Arica	1–1	1–0		1–1	1–0	4–2	1–4	3–2	0–2	1–1
Juventud Gloria	1–3	1–1	2–2		3–0	1–1	3–2	1–4	2–1	2–1
KDT Nacional	1–0	3–1	2–0	2–2		1–0	1–0	2–1	2–1	4–0
Mariscal Castilla	2–3	2–2	1–1	0–1	1–2		0–1	2–1	2–1	2–0
Porvenir Miraflores	1–1	2–2	1–0	1–2	1–2	W.O.		3–1	3–1	5–2
Santiago Barranco	2–3	1–0	4–2	1–0	2–4	6–1	2–0		2–2	4–2
Unidad Vecinal Nº3	4–0	1–3	5–3	1–0	2–1	4–2	3–1	3–1		1–0
Unión América	2–4	4–3	1–2	3–1	3–3	8–2	4–2	1–0	0–1	

Updated to match(es) played on 1961. Source: Diario El Comercio, La Prensa and Crónica.
Legend: Blue = home team win; Yellow = draw; Red = away team win.

== Triangular de Ascenso a Segunda División ==
Íntimos de La Legua, as champions of the 1961 Liga Provincial del Callao, Estudiantes San Roberto, as champions of the 1961 Liga Provincial de Lima, and Víctor Bielich, as champions of the 1961 Liga de los Balnearios del Sur were supposed to play a final to determine promotion to the 1962 Segunda División.

=== Standings ===
Pos	Team	Pld	W	D	L	GF	GA	GD	Pts	Qualification or relegation	INT	VIC	EST
1	Íntimos de La Legua	2	2	0	0	5	1	+4	4	1962 Segunda División			3–0
2	Víctor Bielich	2	0	1	1	3	4	−1	1		1–2		
3	Estudiantes San Roberto	2	0	1	1	2	5	−3	1			2–2	

Source: Diario El Comercio, La Prensa and Crónica.
Legend: Blue = home team win; Yellow = draw; Red = away team win.

Íntimos de La Legua earned promotion to the 1962 Segunda División.

== See also ==
- 1961 Peruvian Primera División
- 1961 Torneo Relámpago
