= Valeriano López =

Peruvian footballer (1926-1993)

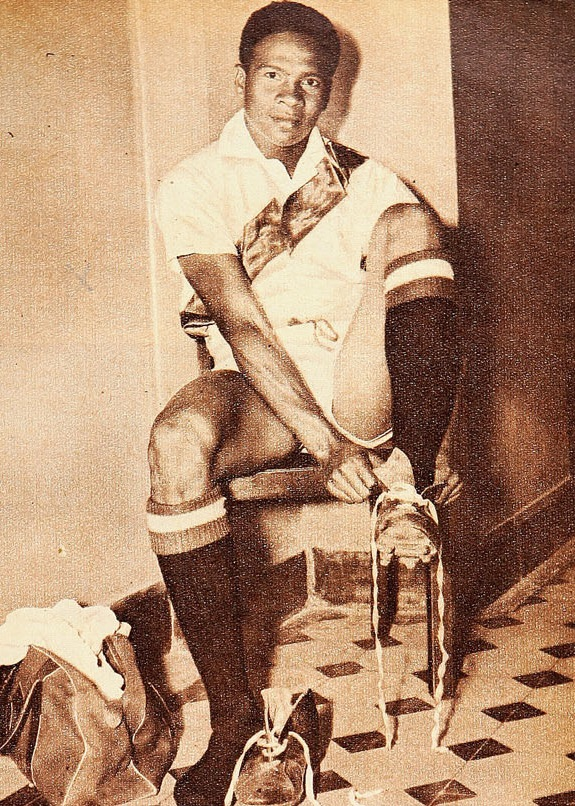

Personal information
- Full name: Valeriano López Mendiola
- Date of birth: 4 May 1926
- Place of birth: Casma, Peru
- Date of death: 7 May 1993 (aged 67)
- Place of death: Callao, Peru
- Height: 1.88 m (6 ft 2 in)
- Position: Forward

Youth career
- Sport Boys

Senior career*
Years	Team	Apps	(Gls)
1946–1948	Sport Boys	54	(62)
1949–1950	Deportivo Cali	39	(43)
1951–1952	Sport Boys	30	(44)
1953	Huracán	18	(10)
1954–1956	Alianza Lima	38	(33)
1957	Mariscal Castilla	5	(4)
1958–1960	Sport Boys	10	(7)
1961	Deportivo Cali	5	(4)
Total		199	(207)

International career
1947–1955	Peru	14	(9)
- * Club domestic league appearances and goals

Valeriano López Mendiola (4 May 1926 – 7 May 1993) was a football forward from Peru, nicknamed Tanque de Casma. Recognized as one of Peru's most important players, he was an all round forward with great finishing, positioning, and heading skills.

Prolific goalscorer, next to Ferreyra and Friedenreich, have been only the American professional footballers with an average of more than 1 goal per match, having made 207 goals in 199 games of 1946 to his retirement in 1961.

== Biography ==
=== Club career ===
López's career began with the Peruvian club Sport Boys at the age of 20. He became a prolific goalscorer, winning the Peruvian league top-scorer honor its three first seasons, (1946, 1947 and 1948) with 62 goals scored in 54 matches. After a successful beginning in Peru, in 1949 it is punished to perpetuity for the practice of soccer to escape of the concentration of the Peru national football team days before the South American Championship of Brazil.

López then moved to Colombia club Deportivo Cali.

=== International career ===
His international career with Peru was short but prolific. He scored nine goals in 14 appearances. He was the top scorer in the 1952 Panamerican Championship with seven goals, five of them headers against Panama, in a final victory of 7–1. He participated in two South American championships, ten years apart, in 1947 and 1957, due to a suspension for indiscipline that caused him to miss the 1949 South American Championship in Brazil.

== Statistics ==
=== Club career ===
Team	Years	Goals	Matches	Goal average
Sport Boys	1946–1948	62	54	1.15
Deportivo Cali	1949–1950	43	39	1.10
Sport Boys	1951–1952	44	30	1.47
CA Huracán	1953	10	18	0.55
Alianza Lima	1954–1958	33	38	0.87
Mariscal Castilla	1959	4	5	0.80
Sport Boys	1960	7	10	0.70
Deportivo Cali	1961	4	5	0.80
Total	1946–1961	207	199	1.04

=== International goals ===
Scores and results table. Peru's goal tally first:

List of international goals scored by Valeriano López
No.	Date	Venue	Opponent	Score	Result	Competition
1.	19 December 1947	Estadio George Capwell, Guayaquil, Ecuador	Chile	1–2	1–2	1947 South American Championship
2.	11 December 1947	Estadio George Capwell, Guayaquil, Ecuador	Argentina	2–3	2–3	1947 South American Championship
3.	23 March 1952	Estadio Nacional, Santiago, Chile	Panama	1–0	7–1	1952 Panamerican Championship
4.	23 March 1952	Estadio Nacional, Santiago, Chile	Panama	2–0	7–1	1952 Panamerican Championship
5.	23 March 1952	Estadio Nacional, Santiago, Chile	Panama	4–0	7–1	1952 Panamerican Championship
6.	23 March 1952	Estadio Nacional, Santiago, Chile	Panama	5–0	7–1	1952 Panamerican Championship
7.	23 March 1952	Estadio Nacional, Santiago, Chile	Panama	6–1	7–1	1952 Panamerican Championship
8.	30 March 1952	Estadio Nacional, Santiago, Chile	Uruguay	2–4	2–5	1952 Panamerican Championship
9.	2 April 1952	Estadio Nacional, Santiago, Chile	Chile	2–2	2–3	1952 Panamerican Championship

== Honours ==
Season	Team	Title
1951	Sport Boys	Peruvian League
1954	Alianza Lima	Peruvian League
1955	Alianza Lima	Peruvian League
1958	Sport Boys	Peruvian League

== Individual honours ==
- Peruvian Championship's Top Scorer: 1946, 1947, 1948, 1951
- 1951 South American Top scorer on the year
- 1952 Panamerican Championship: Top Scorer

=== Records ===
- He also set a record by scoring in 12 consecutive Colombian League games.
