= Liguilla de Ascenso a Segunda División =

- Founded: 1954
- Folded: 1973
- Country: Peru
- Confederation: CONMEBOL
- Level on pyramid: 3 (1954–1972); 2 (1973)
- Promotion to: Primera División; Segunda División

The Liguilla de Ascenso a Segunda División was a championship of yesteryear that existed in Peru where the champion was promoted to play in the Segunda División the following year (except in its last edition where it was promoted to the Primera División).

It began to be played in 1954 with the champions of the Ligas Provinciales de Lima y Callao. In the following years, the champion of the Liga de los Balnearios del Sur, the Liga Distrital de San Isidro and, in its latest editions, other districts of Lima joined.

It was played until 1973 and after the inclusion of the teams from the province of Lima in the Copa Perú it was replaced by Liga Provincial de Lima (Interligas de Lima).

== Champions ==
Tournament names:

- 1954–1955: Liguilla de Ascenso
- 1956–1961: Triangular de Ascenso
- 1962–1963: Liguilla de Promoción
- 1964–1971: Cuadrangular de Ascenso
- 1972: Hexagonal de Ascenso
- 1973: Octagonal de Ascenso

Ed.	Season	Champion	Runner-up
1	1954	Unión América	Chim Pum Callao
2	1955	Unidad Vecinal Nº3	Mariscal Castilla
3	1956	Mariscal Castilla	Sport Almagro
4	1957	Defensor Lima	Sport Dinámico
5	1958	San Antonio Miraflores	Atlético Lusitania
6	1959	Alianza Chorrillos	Sport Dinámico
7	1960	Association Chorrillos	Telmo Carbajo
8	1961	Íntimos de la Legua	Víctor Bielich
9	1962	Atlético Lusitania	Deportivo Vigíl
10	1963	ADO	Santiago Barranco
11	1964	Atlético Sicaya	Atlético Banfield
12	1965	Racing San Isidro	Atlético Banfield
13	1966	Independiente Sacachispas	Deportivo Bancoper
14	1967	Deportivo SIMA	Deportivo Nacional
15	1968	Huracán San Isidro	Centro Chupaca
16	1969	Estudiantes San Roberto	Grumete Medina
17	1970	Atlético Chalaco	Defensor San Borja
18	1971	Deportivo Bancoper	CITSA
19	1972	CITSA	Grumete Medina
20	1973	Atlético Barrio Frigorífico	Deportivo Helvético
Defunct Tournament (See: Región IX Metropolitana and Liga Provincial de Lima (Interligas de Lima))

== 1954 Liguilla de Ascenso ==
Chim Pum Callao, as champions of the 1954 Liga Provincial del Callao, and Unión América, as champions of the 1954 Liga Provincial de Lima, were supposed to play a final to determine promotion to the 1955 Segunda División.

Team 1	Score	Team 2
Unión América	2–1	Chim Pum Callao

Unión América earned promotion to the 1955 Segunda División.

== 1955 Liguilla de Ascenso ==
Unidad Vecinal No. 3, as champions of the 1955 Liga Provincial del Callao, and Mariscal Castilla, as champions of the 1955 Liga Provincial de Lima, were supposed to play a final to determine promotion to the 1956 Segunda División.

Team 1	Score	Team 2
Unidad Vecinal Nº3	1–0	Mariscal Castilla

Unidad Vecinal No. 3 earned promotion to the 1956 Segunda División.

== 1956 Triangular de Ascenso ==
Sport Dinámico, as champions of the 1956 Liga Provincial del Callao, Mariscal Castilla, as champions of the 1956 Liga Provincial de Lima, and Sport Almagro, as champions of the 1956 Liga de los Balnearios del Sur were supposed to play a final to determine promotion to the 1957 Segunda División.

=== Standings ===
Pos	Team	Pld	W	D	L	GF	GA	GD	Pts	Qualification or relegation	CAS	ALM	DIN
1	Mariscal Castilla	2	2	0	0	7	3	+4	4	1957 Segunda División		5–2	
2	Sport Almagro	2	1	0	1	4	6	−2	2				2–1
3	Sport Dinámico	2	0	0	2	2	4	−2	0		1–2		

Source: Diario El Comercio, La Prensa and Crónica.

Mariscal Castilla earned promotion to the 1957 Segunda División.

== 1957 Triangular de Ascenso ==
Sport Dinámico, as champions of the 1957 Liga Provincial del Callao, Defensor Lima, as champions of the 1957 Liga Provincial de Lima, and Defensor Espinar, as champions of the 1957 Liga de los Balnearios del Sur were supposed to play a final to determine promotion to the 1958 Segunda División.

=== Standings ===
Pos	Team	Pld	W	D	L	GF	GA	GD	Pts	Qualification or relegation	DEF	DIN	ESP
1	Defensor Lima	2	1	1	0	4	3	+1	3	1958 Segunda División		3–3	
2	Sport Dinámico	2	0	2	0	5	5	0	2				2–2
3	Defensor Espinar	2	0	1	1	2	3	−1	1		0–1		

Source: Diario El Comercio, La Prensa and Crónica.

Defensor Lima earned promotion to the 1958 Segunda División.

== 1958 Triangular de Ascenso ==
Sport Dinámico, as champions of the 1958 Liga Provincial del Callao, Atlético Lusitania, as champions of the 1958 Liga Provincial de Lima, and San Antonio, as champions of the 1958 Liga de los Balnearios del Sur were supposed to play a final to determine promotion to the 1959 Segunda División.

=== Standings ===
Pos	Team	Pld	W	D	L	GF	GA	GD	Pts	Qualification or relegation	SAN	LUS	DIN
1	San Antonio Miraflores	2	1	1	0	3	2	+1	3	1959 Segunda División		1–1	
2	Atlético Lusitania	2	0	2	0	2	2	0	2				1–1
3	Sport Dinámico	2	0	1	1	2	3	−1	1		1–2		

Source: Diario El Comercio, La Prensa and Crónica.

San Antonio Miraflores earned promotion to the 1959 Segunda División.

== 1959 Triangular de Ascenso ==
Sport Dinámico, as champions of the 1959 Liga Provincial del Callao, Combinado Rímac, as champions of the 1959 Liga Provincial de Lima, and Alianza Chorrillos, as champions of the 1959 Liga de los Balnearios del Sur were supposed to play a final to determine promotion to the 1960 Segunda División.

=== Standings ===
Pos	Team	Pld	W	D	L	GF	GA	GD	Pts	Qualification or relegation	ALI	DIN	COM
1	Alianza Chorrillos	2	2	0	0	4	2	+2	4	1960 Segunda División		2–1	
2	Sport Dinámico	2	1	0	1	4	3	+1	2				3–1
3	Combinado Rímac	2	0	0	2	2	5	−3	0		1–2		

Source: Diario El Comercio, La Prensa and Crónica.

Alianza Chorrillos earned promotion to the 1960 Segunda División.

== 1960 Triangular de Ascenso ==
Telmo Carbajo, as champions of the 1960 Liga Provincial del Callao, Alianza Libertad, as champions of the 1960 Liga Provincial de Lima, and Association Chorrillos, as champions of the 1960 Liga de los Balnearios del Sur were supposed to play a final to determine promotion to the 1961 Segunda División.

=== Standings ===
Pos	Team	Pld	W	D	L	GF	GA	GD	Pts	Qualification or relegation	TEL	ACH	ALI
1	Telmo Carbajo	2	1	1	0	5	4	+1	3			2–2	
2	Association Chorrillos	2	1	1	0	4	3	+1	3	1961 Segunda División			2–1
3	Alianza Libertad	2	0	0	2	3	5	−2	0		2–3		

Source: Diario El Comercio, La Prensa and Crónica.

=== Title Play-off ===
Team 1	Agg.	Team 2	1st leg	2nd leg
Association Chorrillos	3–2	Telmo Carbajo	1–1	2–1

Association Chorrillos earned promotion to the 1961 Segunda División.

== 1961 Triangular de Ascenso ==
Íntimos de La Legua, as champions of the 1961 Liga Provincial del Callao, Estudiantes San Roberto, as champions of the 1961 Liga Provincial de Lima, and Víctor Bielich, as champions of the 1961 Liga de los Balnearios del Sur were supposed to play a final to determine promotion to the 1962 Segunda División.

=== Standings ===
Pos	Team	Pld	W	D	L	GF	GA	GD	Pts	Qualification or relegation	INT	VIC	EST
1	Íntimos de La Legua	2	2	0	0	5	1	+4	4	1962 Segunda División			3–0
2	Víctor Bielich	2	0	1	1	3	4	−1	1		1–2		
3	Estudiantes San Roberto	2	0	1	1	2	5	−3	1			2–2	

Source: Diario El Comercio, La Prensa and Crónica.

Íntimos de La Legua earned promotion to the 1962 Segunda División.

== 1962 Liguilla de Promoción ==
Deportivo Vigil, as champions of the 1961 Liga Provincial del Callao, and Atlético Lusitania, as champions of the 1962 Liga Provincial de Lima, were supposed to play a final to determine promotion to the 1963 Segunda División.

Defensor Espinar, as the champion of the 1962 Liga de los Balnearios del Sur, did not participate because the FPF annulled the tournament due to the clubs’ defiance in refusing to comply with the decision of the FPF’s Disciplinary Committee to play the suspended match between Víctor Bielich and Ciclista Alianza Miraflores.

Team 1	Score	Team 2
Atlético Lusitania	8–0	Deportivo Vigil

Atlético Lusitania earned promotion to the 1963 Segunda División.

== 1963 Liguilla de Promoción ==
ADO, as champions of the 1963 Liga Provincial del Callao, and Santiago Barranco, as champions of the 1963 Liga de los Balnearios del Sur, were supposed to play a final to determine promotion to the 1964 Segunda División.

The champion of the 1963 Liga Provincial de Lima did not take part in the tournament due to its disagreement with the decision of the Peruvian Football Federation to include the champion club of the Liga Distrital de San Isidro in the Liguilla de Promoción tournament to the 1964 Peruvian Segunda División.

As a result of this situation, the Peruvian Football Federation decided to annul the Lima First Division tournament.

Team 1	Score	Team 2
ADO	3–2	Santiago Barranco

ADO earned promotion to the 1964 Segunda División.

== 1964 Cuadrangular de Ascenso ==
Atlético Sicaya, as champions of the 1964 Liga Provincial del Callao; Atlético Banfield, as champions of the 1964 Liga Provincial del Lima; Association Chorrillos, as champions of the 1964 Liga de los Balnearios del Sur; and Deportivo Bancoper, as champions of the 1964 Liga Distrital de San Isidrio, were to compete in a final four (round-robin) to determine promotion to the 1965 Segunda División.

=== Standings ===
Pos	Team	Pld	W	D	L	GF	GA	GD	Pts	Qualification or relegation	SIC	BAN	BCO	ACH
1	Atlético Sicaya	3	3	0	0	9	4	+5	6	1965 Segunda División		5–3		2–1
2	Atlético Banfield	3	2	0	1	7	6	+1	4				2–1	
3	Deportivo Bancoper	3	0	1	2	2	5	−3	1		0–2			
4	Association Chorrillos	3	0	1	2	2	5	−3	1			0–2	1–1	

Atlético Sicaya earned promotion to the 1965 Segunda División.

== 1965 Cuadrangular de Ascenso ==
Atlético Barrio Frigorífico, as champions of the 1965 Liga Provincial del Callao; Atlético Banfield, as champions of the 1965 Liga Provincial del Lima; Association Chorrillos, as champions of the 1965 Liga de los Balnearios del Sur; and Racing San Isidro, as champions of the 1965 Liga Distrital de San Isidrio, were to compete in a final four (round-robin) to determine promotion to the 1966 Segunda División.

=== Standings ===
Pos	Team	Pld	W	D	L	GF	GA	GD	Pts	Qualification or relegation	RAC	BAN	BAR	ACH
1	Racing San Isidro	3	3	0	0	12	4	+8	6	1966 Segunda División			4–2	
2	Atlético Banfield	3	1	1	1	3	4	−1	3		1–3			
3	Atlético Barrio Frigorífico	3	0	2	1	4	6	−2	2			1–1		1–1
4	Association Chorrillos	3	0	1	2	2	7	−5	1		1–5	0–1		

Racing earned promotion to the 1966 Segunda División.

== 1966 Cuadrangular de Ascenso ==
Atlético Chalaco, as champions of the 1966 Liga Provincial del Callao; Independiente Sacachispas, as champions of the 1966 Liga Provincial del Lima; Unión Buenos Aires, as champions of the 1966 Liga de los Balnearios del Sur; and Deportivo Bancoper, as champions of the 1966 Liga Distrital de San Isidrio, were to compete in a final four (round-robin) to determine promotion to the 1967 Segunda División.

=== Standings ===
Pos	Team	Pld	W	D	L	GF	GA	GD	Pts	Qualification or relegation	IND	BAN	CHA	UBA
1	Independiente Sacachispas	3	2	1	0	4	1	+3	5	1967 Segunda División		2–0	1–1	
2	Deportivo Bancoper	3	2	0	1	5	2	+3	4					4–0
3	Atlético Chalaco	3	1	1	1	7	3	+4	3			0–1		6–1
4	Unión Buenos Aires Chorrillos	3	0	0	3	1	11	−10	0		0–1			

Independiente Sacachispas earned promotion to the 1967 Segunda División.

== 1967 Cuadrangular de Ascenso ==
Deportivo SIMA, as champions of the 1967 Liga Provincial del Callao; Estudiantes San Roberto, as champions of the 1967 Liga Provincial del Lima; Sport Huáscar Barranco, as champions of the 1967 Liga de los Balnearios del Sur; and Deportivo Nacional, as champions of the 1967 Liga Distrital de San Isidrio, were to compete in a final four (round-robin) to determine promotion to the 1968 Segunda División.

=== Standings ===
Pos	Team	Pld	W	D	L	GF	GA	GD	Pts	Qualification or relegation	SIM	NAC	EST	HUA
1	Deportivo SIMA	3	3	0	0	12	4	+8	6	1968 Segunda División				6–0
2	Deportivo Nacional	3	2	0	1	8	6	+2	4		1–4			3–1
3	Estudiantes San Roberto	3	1	0	2	3	7	−4	2		0–2	1–4		
4	Sport Huáscar Barranco	3	0	0	3	2	11	−9	0				1–2	

Deportivo SIMA earned promotion to the 1968 Segunda División.

== 1972 Hexagonal de Ascenso ==
The board of the Peruvian Football Federation ordered the elimination of the Segunda División promotion tournament.

It was also established that the champion of the Hexagonal de Ascenso would qualify for the Octogonal de Ascenso of Region 13 (Metropolitan Lima and Callao) of the 1973 Copa Perú, which granted promotion to the Primera División for the 1974 season.

This qualification would be granted only if the champion club of the hexagonal finished among the top six teams of the 1973 First Division tournament of its league of origin.

=== Standings ===
Pos	Team	Pld	W	D	L	GF	GA	GD	Pts	Qualification	CIT	GRU	USM	ACH	REL	MEL
1	CITSA	5	3	2	0	12	5	+7	8	1973 Octogonal de Ascenso		1–1		2–1	3–0	
2	Grumete Medina	5	3	2	0	9	3	+6	8				1–1	2–0		
3	Universidad San Marcos	5	1	4	0	7	4	+3	6		2–2			4–1	0–0	
4	Association Chorrillos	5	2	0	3	6	8	−2	4						1–0	3–0
5	Atlético Relámpago	5	1	1	3	1	6	−5	3			0–2				1–0
6	Deportivo Melzi	5	0	1	4	2	11	−9	1		1–4	1–3	0–0			

Source: Diario El Comercio, La Prensa and Crónica.

=== Title playoff ===
Team 1	Score	Team 2
CITSA	1–0	Grumete Medina

CITSA earned qualification for the 1973 Copa Perú.

== 1973 Octogonal de Ascenso ==
=== Standings ===
Pos	Team	Pld	W	D	L	GF	GA	GD	Pts	Qualification	BAR	HEL	CIC	CIT	SAN	SUC	FAB	VIT
1	Atlético Barrio Frigorífico	7	4	3	0	11	3	+8	11	1974 Primera División		3–0	1–1	0–0		4–1		
2	Deportivo Helvético	7	5	1	1	10	3	+7	11	Revalidación Metropolitana			0–0	1–0	3–0		2–0	
3	Ciclista Lima	7	2	5	0	6	6	0	9						0–0		2–0	2–1
4	CITSA	7	2	4	1	6	3	+3	8				1–1			1–1	3–0	1–0
5	Santiago Barranco	7	2	3	2	9	7	+2	7		1–2			0–0			4–2	5–0
6	Mariscal Sucre	7	2	3	2	11	9	+2	7			0–2	1–1		0–0			
7	Deportivo FABISA	7	1	0	6	5	15	−10	2		0–1					0–2		3–1
8	Sport Vitarte	7	0	1	6	3	15	−12	1		0–0	0–2				1–6		

Source: Diario La Crónica

=== Title playoff ===
Team 1	Score	Team 2
Atlético Barrio Frigorífico	2–0	Deportivo Helvético

Atlético Barrio Frigorífico earned promotion to the 1974 Primera División.

=== Revalidación Metropolitana ===
Team 1	Agg.	Team 2	1st leg	2nd leg
Sport Boys	6–3	Deportivo Helvético	3–1	3–2

Sport Boys remain in the Primera División.
