= Club Mariscal Castilla =

Peruvian football club

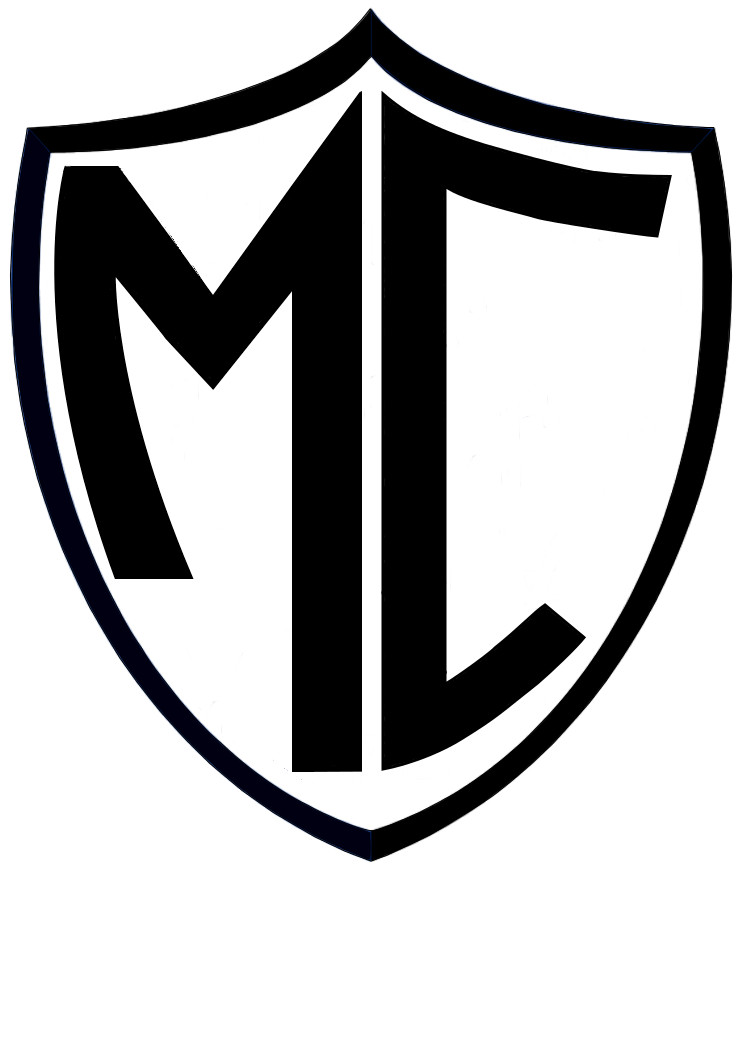
- Full name: Club Mariscal Castilla
- Nicknames: Los Loritos; Verdolagas
- Founded: 2 June 1950
- Dissolved: 1967; 59 years ago
Home colours	Away colours

Club Mariscal Castilla was a Peruvian football club, located in the city of Lima. The club was founded with the name of Club Mariscal Castilla in honor of the Peruvian caudillo and President of Peru Ramón Castilla and played in Peruvian Primera Division from 1958 until 1960.

== History ==
Club Mariscal Castilla of Rímac (nicknamed "Los Loritos" or "Verdolagas") was founded on 2 June 1950, with Francisco Ortega Benites as its first president. The club won the Tercera División Provincial de Lima in 1951 and then the Segunda División Provincial de Lima in 1953, earning promotion to the Liga Provincial de Lima for 1954, where it finished as runner-up.

For the 1955 season, Mariscal Castilla won the Liga Provincial de Lima and qualified for the 1955 Liguilla de Ascenso, where it lost to Lima-based Unidad Vecinal No. 3 (affiliated with the Liga Provincial del Callao). The following year, the club once again won the Liga Provincial de Lima and then the 1956 Triangular de Ascenso, securing promotion to the 1957 Peruvian Segunda División.

In 1957, it competed in the Peruvian Segunda División alongside Carlos Concha of Callao. Mariscal Castilla maintained its lead by defeating Atlético Lusitania and Association Chorrillos in the final rounds, ultimately winning the championship. The club was promoted to the Peruvian Primera División in 1958, breaking the trend of recently promoted teams being immediately relegated.

Its first top-flight match was a 5–1 defeat to Deportivo Municipal, which sparked a rivalry with the edil side. As the team adjusted to First Division football, it endured a series of defeats, followed by a 1–1 draw against Mariscal Sucre, marking another emerging rivalry.

After six matchdays with only one point, the club earned its first victory against Sporting Cristal, beginning a run of wins and draws that allowed it not only to avoid relegation but also to contend near the top of the table. By the end of the 1958 season, Mariscal Castilla achieved a remarkable third-place finish—an outstanding accomplishment for a modest club.

In 1959, it had a steady campaign that ensured its stay in the top flight. However, in 1960, it was relegated to the Second Division. In the 1961 Peruvian Segunda División due to a lack of investment, the team had a poor campaign and was relegated again. Back in the Liga Provincial de Lima, the club eventually sold its category to Seguro Social in 1967.

== Statistics and results in First Division ==
=== League history ===
Season	Div.	Pos.	Pl.	W	D	L	GF	GA	P	Notes
1958	1st	3	22	10	4	8	29	33	24	3/10 Regular Season
1959	1st	7	22	6	7	9	36	41	19	7/10 Regular Season
1960	1st	10	18	4	1	13	30	54	9	10/10 Regular Season

== Honours ==
=== Senior titles ===
Keys

- Record
- ^{(s)} Shared record

Type	Competition	Titles	Runner-up	Winning years	Runner-up years
National (League)	Segunda División	1	—	1957	—
Regional (League)	Liguilla de Ascenso a Segunda División	1	1	1954	1955
Regional (League)	Primera División Amateur de Lima	2	3	1955, 1956	1954, 1964, 1966
Regional (League)	Segunda División Amateur de Lima	1	—	1953 Serie A	—
Regional (League)	Tercera División Amateur de Lima	1	—	1951	—

== See also ==
- List of football clubs in Peru
- Peruvian football league system
