= Vicente Gambardella =

Argentine-Chilean footballer (born 1932)

Personal information
- Full name: Vicente Antonio Gambardella Garaffo
- Date of birth: 5 October 1932
- Place of birth: Argentina
- Position: Forward

Youth career
- Quilmes

Senior career*
Years	Team	Apps	(Gls)
1948–1950	Quilmes		
1951–1955	River Plate	9	(1)
1954	→ Tigre (loan)		
1955–1956	Huracán	7	(0)
1957	Universidad Católica		
1958	Atlético Chalaco		
1958	Rivadavia Necochea	–	(–)
1959	Estudiantes	13	(1)
1960–1961	Ferro Carril Oeste	7	(1)
1962	San Lorenzo	–	(–)
- * Club domestic league appearances and goals

Vicente Antonio Gambardella Garaffo (born 5 October 1932) was an Argentine footballer who played for clubs of Argentina and Chile.

== Teams ==
- (Argentina) Quilmes 1945–1950
- (Argentina) River Plate 1951–1953
- (Argentina) Tigre 1954
- (Argentina) River Plate 1955
- (Argentina) Huracán 1955–1956
- (Chile) Universidad Católica 1957
- (Peru) Atlético Chalaco 1958
- (Argentina) Rivadavia de Necochea 1958
- (Argentina) Estudiantes de La Plata 1959
- (Argentina) Ferro Carril Oeste 1960
- (Argentina) San Lorenzo 1962

== Honours ==
River Plate

- Argentine Primera División: 1953

Rivadavia de Necochea

- Liga Necochense de Fútbol: 1958
