= Campeonato de Apertura (Perú) =

Peruvian football competition

- Founded: 1945
- Folded: 1969; 57 years ago
- Region: Peru
- Most championships: Alianza Lima (6 titles)

The Campeonato de Apertura, also called the Apertura, was a Peruvian football competition created and then organized by the Asociación No Amateur (ANA). It was played from 1945 to 1961 and then discontinued until 1969.

The tournament was played before the start of the Peruvian Primera División and had no influence on the tournament. These matches are neither considered official nor friendly since they were closer to an exhibition format than to a real competition for points.

In most editions, the tournament was developed in quadrangles where the four best-placed teams in the final standings of each Peruvian Primera División of the previous year participated.

== Champions ==
- (In bracket, title count):

Ed.	Season	Champion	Runner-up	Winning manager
1	1945	Universitario de Deportes (1)	Sucre	(Peru) Arturo Fernández
2	1946	Deportivo Municipal (1); Universitario de Deportes (2)	—	(Peru) Juan Valdivieso (Peru) Arturo Fernández
3	1947	Alianza Lima (1)	Universitario de Deportes	(Peru) Adelfo Magallanes
4	1948	Atlético Chalaco (1)	Deportivo Municipal	(Peru) Raúl Pardón
5	1949	Alianza Lima (2)	Sporting Tabaco	(Peru) Juan Berastaín
6	1950	Alianza Lima (3)	Deportivo Municipal	(Italy) Piado Petrovich
7	1951	Deportivo Municipal (2)	Sporting Tabaco	(Peru) Juan Valdivieso
8	1952	Mariscal Sucre (1); Sport Boys (1)	—	(Argentina) Ángel Fernández Roca (Peru) Alfonso Huapaya
9	1953	Atlético Chalaco (2)	Centro Iqueño	(Argentina) Francisco Villegas
10	1954	Sporting Tabaco (1)	Alianza Lima	(Argentina) César Viccino
11	1955	Alianza Lima (4)	Universitario de Deportes	(Peru) Adelfo Magallanes
12	1956	Alianza Lima (5)	Universitario de Deportes	(Peru) Adelfo Magallanes
13	1957	Deportivo Municipal (3)	Sporting Cristal	(Peru) Juan Valdivieso
14	1958	Centro Iqueño (1)	Atlético Chalaco	(Paraguay) Miguel Ortega
15	1959	Sport Boys (2)	Alianza Lima	(Peru) Marcos Calderón
16	1960	Sport Boys (3)	Centro Iqueño	(Peru) Marcos Calderón
17	1961	Sporting Cristal (1)	Universitario de Deportes	(Peru) Juan Honores
18	1963	Alianza Lima (6)	Sporting Cristal	(Brazil) Jaime de Almeida
19	1969	Universitario de Deportes (3)	Alianza Lima	(Uruguay) Roberto Scarone

== Titles by club ==
Rank	Club	Winners	Runners-up	Winning years	Runners-up years
1	Alianza Lima	6	3	1947, 1949, 1950, 1955, 1956, 1963	1954, 1959, 1969
2	Universitario de Deportes	3	4	1945, 1946, 1969	1947, 1955, 1956, 1961
2	Deportivo Municipal	3	2	1946, 1951, 1957	1948, 1950
2	Sport Boys	3	—	1952, 1959, 1960	—
3	Atlético Chalaco	2	1	1948, 1953	1958
4	Centro Iqueño	1	2	1958	1953, 1960
4	Sporting Cristal	1	2	1961	1957, 1963
4	Sporting Tabaco	1	2	1954	1949, 1951
4	Mariscal Sucre	1	1	1952	1945

== 1945 Campeonato de Apertura ==
=== Standings ===
Pos	Team	Pld	W	D	L	GF	GA	GD	Pts	Qualification or relegation	UNI	SUC	MUN	ALI
1	Universitario	3	2	1	0	8	2	+6	5	Champion		3–0		3–0
2	Sucre	3	1	1	1	4	6	−2	3				2–1	
3	Deportivo Municipal	3	0	2	1	4	5	−1	2		2–2			1–1
4	Alianza Lima	3	0	2	1	3	6	−3	2			2–2		

Legend: Blue = home team win; Yellow = draw; Red = away team win.
Rules for classification: 1) Points; 2) Goal difference; 3) Goals for; 4) Fair play points; 5) Drawing of lots.

=== Results ===
1 April 1945	Universitario	2–2	Deportivo Municipal	Estadio Nacional, Lima

1 April 1945	Alianza Lima	2–2	Sucre	Estadio Nacional, Lima

15 April 1945	Deportivo Municipal	1–1	Alianza Lima	Estadio Nacional, Lima

15 April 1945	Universitario	3–0	Sucre	Estadio Nacional, Lima

22 April 1945	Sucre	2–1	Deportivo Municipal	Estadio Nacional, Lima

22 April 1945	Universitario	3–0	Alianza Lima	Estadio Nacional, Lima

== 1946 Campeonato de Apertura ==
=== Standings ===
Pos	Team	Pld	W	D	L	GF	GA	GD	Pts	Qualification or relegation	UNI	MUN	CHA	ALI
1	Universitario	3	2	0	1	12	6	+6	4	Champions			5–2	6–2
2	Deportivo Municipal	3	1	2	0	5	4	+1	4	Champions	2–1			
3	Atlético Chalaco	3	1	1	1	7	9	−2	3			2–2		3–2
4	Alianza Lima	3	0	1	2	5	10	−5	1			1–1		

Legend: Blue = home team win; Yellow = draw; Red = away team win.
Rules for classification: 1) Points; 2) Goal difference; 3) Goals for; 4) Fair play points; 5) Drawing of lots.

=== Results ===
14 April 1946	Atlético Chalaco	2–2	Deportivo Municipal	Estadio Nacional, Lima

14 April 1946	Universitario	6–2	Alianza Lima	Estadio Nacional, Lima

21 April 1946	Alianza Lima	1–1	Deportivo Municipal	Estadio Nacional, Lima

21 April 1946	Universitario	5–2	Atlético Chalaco	Estadio Nacional, Lima

28 April 1946	Deportivo Municipal	2–1	Universitario	Estadio Nacional, Lima

28 April 1946	Atlético Chalaco	3–2	Alianza Lima	Estadio Nacional, Lima

== 1947 Campeonato de Apertura ==
=== Standings ===
Pos	Team	Pld	W	D	L	GF	GA	GD	Pts	Qualification or relegation	ALI	UNI	TAB	SUC
1	Alianza Lima	3	2	0	1	4	3	+1	4	Title play-off				1–0
2	Universitario	3	2	0	1	4	4	0	4	Title play-off	1–0		1–3	
3	Sporting Tabaco	3	1	0	2	6	7	−1	2		2–3			
4	Sucre	3	1	0	2	4	4	0	2			1–2	3–1	

Legend: Blue = home team win; Yellow = draw; Red = away team win.
Rules for classification: 1) Points; 2) Goal difference; 3) Goals for; 4) Fair play points; 5) Drawing of lots.

=== Results ===
20 April 1947	Universitario	1–3	Sporting Tabaco	Estadio Nacional, Lima

20 April 1947	Alianza Lima	1–0	Sucre	Estadio Nacional, Lima

27 April 1947	Sucre	1–2	Universitario	Estadio Nacional, Lima

27 April 1947	Sporting Tabaco	2–3	Alianza Lima	Estadio Nacional, Lima

4 May 1947	Universitario	1–0	Alianza Lima	Estadio Nacional, Lima

4 May 1947	Sucre	3–1	Sporting Tabaco	Estadio Nacional, Lima

==== Third place play-off ====
15 May 1947	Sporting Tabaco	4–2	Sucre	Estadio Nacional, Lima

==== Title play-off ====
15 May 1947	Alianza Lima	4–1	Universitario	Estadio Nacional, Lima
	Oscar Herrera 17' 44' 88'; Gregorio Joya 20'		Gilberto Torres 59'	Referee: Guillermo Barr

== 1948 Campeonato de Apertura ==
=== Standings ===
Pos	Team	Pld	W	D	L	GF	GA	GD	Pts	Qualification or relegation	CHA	MUN	SBA	ALI
1	Atlético Chalaco	3	2	1	0	4	2	+2	5	Champion		2–1		
2	Deportivo Municipal	3	2	0	1	5	3	+2	4				2–0	2–1
3	Sport Boys	3	1	0	2	3	5	−2	2		1–2			2–1
4	Alianza Lima	3	0	1	2	2	4	−2	1		0–0			

Legend: Blue = home team win; Yellow = draw; Red = away team win.
Rules for classification: 1) Points; 2) Goal difference; 3) Goals for; 4) Fair play points; 5) Drawing of lots.

=== Results ===
16 May 1948	Atlético Chalaco	2–1	Deportivo Municipal	Estadio Nacional, Lima

16 May 1948	Sport Boys	2–1	Alianza Lima	Estadio Nacional, Lima

23 May 1948	Deportivo Municipal	2–0	Alianza Lima	Estadio Nacional, Lima

23 May 1948	Alianza Lima	0–0	Atlético Chalaco	Estadio Nacional, Lima

30 May 1948	Deportivo Municipal	2–1	Alianza Lima	Estadio Nacional, Lima

30 May 1948	Sport Boys	1–2	Atlético Chalaco	Estadio Nacional, Lima

== 1949 Campeonato de Apertura ==
=== Standings ===
Pos	Team	Pld	W	D	L	GF	GA	GD	Pts	Qualification or relegation	ALI	TAB	UNI	CHA
1	Alianza Lima	3	2	1	0	14	4	+10	5	Title play-off			9–1	4–2
2	Sporting Tabaco	3	2	1	0	7	5	+2	5	Title play-off	1–1		3–2	
3	Universitario	3	1	0	2	8	14	−6	2					5–3
4	Atlético Chalaco	3	0	0	3	7	12	−5	0			2–3		

Legend: Blue = home team win; Yellow = draw; Red = away team win.
Rules for classification: 1) Points; 2) Goal difference; 3) Goals for; 4) Fair play points; 5) Drawing of lots.

=== Results ===
29 May 1949	Alianza Lima	4–2	Atlético Chalaco	Estadio Nacional, Lima

29 May 1949	Sporting Tabaco	3–2	Universitario	Estadio Nacional, Lima

5 June 1949	Universitario	5–3	Atlético Chalaco	Estadio Nacional, Lima

5 June 1949	Sporting Tabaco	1–1	Alianza Lima	Estadio Nacional, Lima

12 June 1949	Atlético Chalaco	2–3	Sporting Tabaco	Estadio Nacional, Lima

12 June 1949	Alianza Lima	9–1	Universitario	Estadio Nacional, Lima
	Emilio Salinas 10' 35' 60' 65' 78'; Víctor Pedraza 14' 69'; Félix Castillo 24'; Emilio Vargas 80'		Alberto Terry 30'	Referee: Guillermo Barr

==== Title play-off ====
19 June 1949	Sporting Tabaco	1–3	Alianza Lima	Estadio Nacional, Lima

== 1950 Campeonato de Apertura ==
=== Standings ===
Pos	Team	Pld	W	D	L	GF	GA	GD	Pts	Qualification or relegation	ALI	MUN	UNI	SUC
1	Alianza Lima	3	2	0	1	6	2	+4	4	Title play-off		3–1		
2	Deportivo Municipal	3	2	0	1	8	6	+2	4	Title play-off				3–2
3	Universitario	3	1	1	1	3	5	−2	3		1–0	1–4		
4	Sucre	3	0	1	2	2	4	−2	1		0–3		1–1	

Legend: Blue = home team win; Yellow = draw; Red = away team win.
Rules for classification: 1) Points; 2) Goal difference; 3) Goals for; 4) Fair play points; 5) Drawing of lots.

=== Results ===
18 June 1950	Universitario	1–0	Alianza Lima	Estadio Nacional, Lima

18 June 1950	Deportivo Municipal	3–2	Sucre	Estadio Nacional, Lima

25 June 1950	Sucre	1–1	Universitario	Estadio Nacional, Lima

25 June 1950	Alianza Lima	3–1	Deportivo Municipal	Estadio Nacional, Lima

29 June 1950	Universitario	1–4	Deportivo Municipal	Estadio Nacional, Lima

29 June 1950	Sucre	0–3	Alianza Lima	Estadio Nacional, Lima

==== Title play-off ====
July 1950	Deportivo Municipal	2–3	Alianza Lima	Estadio Nacional, Lima

== 1951 Campeonato de Apertura ==
=== Standings ===
Pos	Team	Pld	W	D	L	GF	GA	GD	Pts	Qualification or relegation	MUN	TAB	ALI	SBA
1	Deportivo Municipal	3	2	1	0	14	8	+6	5	Champion		7–5	2–2	
2	Sporting Tabaco	3	1	1	1	10	11	−1	3					4–3
3	Alianza Lima	3	0	2	1	4	6	−2	2			1–1		
4	Sport Boys	3	1	0	2	7	10	−3	2		1–5		3–1	

Legend: Blue = home team win; Yellow = draw; Red = away team win.
Rules for classification: 1) Points; 2) Goal difference; 3) Goals for; 4) Fair play points; 5) Drawing of lots.

=== Results ===
20 May 1951	Deportivo Municipal	7–5	Sporting Tabaco	Estadio Nacional, Lima
	Máximo Mosquera; Manuel Rivera; Roque Rivera		Reyes; Villanueva; M. Zapata; Delgado

20 May 1951	Sport Boys	3–1	Alianza Lima	Estadio Nacional, Lima
	Pedro Valdivieso; Guillermo Barbadillo; J. Calderón		Emilio Salinas

24 May 1951	Alianza Lima	1–1	Sporting Tabaco	Estadio Nacional, Lima
	Cornelio Heredia		Eugenio Zapata

24 May 1951	Sport Boys	1–5	Deportivo Municipal	Estadio Nacional, Lima
	Valeriano López		Roque Rivera; Roberto Drago; Germán Colunga

27 May 1951	Sporting Tabaco	4–3	Sport Boys	Estadio Nacional, Lima
			Dagoberto Lavalle; Teodoro Baluarte; Guillermo Valdivieso

27 May 1951	Deportivo Municipal	2–2	Alianza Lima	Estadio Nacional, Lima
	Manuel Rivera; Virgilio Drago		Roberto Castillo; Sixto Cotito

== 1952 Campeonato de Apertura ==
=== Standings ===
Pos	Team	Pld	W	D	L	GF	GA	GD	Pts	Qualification or relegation	SUC	SBA	MUN	ALI
1	Mariscal Sucre	3	1	2	0	8	4	+4	4	Champions			5–1	1–1
2	Sport Boys	3	1	2	0	6	2	+4	4	Champions	2–2			0–0
3	Deportivo Municipal	3	1	0	2	6	11	−5	2			0–4		
4	Alianza Lima	3	0	2	1	3	6	−3	2				2–5	

Legend: Blue = home team win; Yellow = draw; Red = away team win.
Rules for classification: 1) Points; 2) Goal difference; 3) Goals for; 4) Fair play points; 5) Drawing of lots.

=== Results ===
10 August 1952	Sucre	5–1	Deportivo Municipal	Lima

10 August 1952	Sport Boys	0–0	Alianza Lima	Lima

13 August 1952	Alianza Lima	2–5	Deportivo Municipal	Lima

13 August 1952	Mariscal Sucre	2–2	Sport Boys	Lima

17 August 1952	Mariscal Sucre	1–1	Alianza Lima	Lima

17 August 1952	Deportivo Municipal	0–4	Sport Boys	Lima

== 1953 Campeonato de Apertura ==
=== First stage ===
9 May 1953	Centro Iqueño	2–1	Deportivo Municipal	Lima

9 May 1953	Atlético Chalaco	2–1	Alianza Lima	Lima

10 May 1953	Sporting Tabaco	4–0	Universitario	Lima

10 May 1953	Ciclista Lima	2–1	Sport Boys	Lima

10 May 1953	Unión Callao	3–0	Sucre	Lima

=== Second stage ===
14 May 1953	Ciclista Lima	3–1	Unión Callao	Lima

14 May 1953	Centro Iqueño	4–4	Sporting Tabaco	Lima

==== Tiebreaker ====
17 May 1953	Centro Iqueño	2–0	Sporting Tabaco	Lima

=== Semifinal ===
17 May 1953	Atlético Chalaco	2–1	Ciclista Lima	Lima

=== Final ===
24 May 1953	Atlético Chalaco	1–0	Centro Iqueño	Lima
	Félix Mina 20'			Referee: (England) Charles Dean

== 1954 Campeonato de Apertura ==
=== Standings ===
Pos	Team	Pld	W	D	L	GF	GA	GD	Pts	Qualification or relegation	ALI	TAB	SUC	IQU	CHA
1	Alianza Lima	4	3	0	1	9	5	+4	6	Title play-off		3–2			4–1
2	Sporting Tabaco	4	3	0	1	11	7	+4	6	Title play-off				3–2	3–1
3	Mariscal Sucre	4	1	1	2	7	7	0	3		1–2	1–3			
4	Centro Iqueño	4	1	1	2	5	7	−2	3		1–0		1–1		
5	Atlético Chalaco	4	1	0	3	6	11	−5	2				1–4	3–1	

Legend: Blue = home team win; Yellow = draw; Red = away team win.
Rules for classification: 1) Points; 2) Goal difference; 3) Goals for; 4) Fair play points; 5) Drawing of lots.

=== Results ===
16 May 1954	Mariscal Sucre	1–3	Sporting Tabaco	Estadio Nacional, Lima

16 May 1954	Centro Iqueño	1–0	Alianza Lima	Estadio Nacional, Lima

23 May 1954	Atlético Chalaco	3–1	Centro Iqueño	Estadio Nacional, Lima

23 May 1954	Alianza Lima	3–2	Sporting Tabaco	Estadio Nacional, Lima

6 June 1954	Centro Iqueño	1–1	Mariscal Sucre	Estadio Nacional, Lima

6 June 1954	Alianza Lima	4–1	Atlético Chalaco	Estadio Nacional, Lima

13 June 1954	Sporting Tabaco	3–2	Centro Iqueño	Estadio Nacional, Lima

13 June 1954	Atlético Chalaco	1–4	Mariscal Sucre	Estadio Nacional, Lima

20 June 1954	Sporting Tabaco	3–1	Atlético Chalaco	Estadio Nacional, Lima

20 June 1954	Mariscal Sucre	1–2	Alianza Lima	Estadio Nacional, Lima

==== Title play-off ====
26 January 1955	Alianza Lima	2–3	Sporting Tabaco	Estadio Nacional, Lima
	Valeriano López 40' 48'		Hugo Natteri 20' 26'; José Villanueva 76'	Referee: (England) Harry Hartless

== 1955 Campeonato de Apertura ==
=== Standings ===
Pos	Team	Pld	W	D	L	GF	GA	GD	Pts	Qualification or relegation	ALI	UNI	IQU	TAB
1	Alianza Lima	3	2	1	0	10	2	+8	5	Champion		1–1	3–0	
2	Universitario	3	1	1	1	6	7	−1	3					3–2
3	Centro Iqueño	3	1	0	2	4	6	−2	2			4–2		
4	Sporting Tabaco	3	1	0	2	4	9	−5	2		1–6		1–0	

Legend: Blue = home team win; Yellow = draw; Red = away team win.
Rules for classification: 1) Points; 2) Goal difference; 3) Goals for; 4) Fair play points; 5) Drawing of lots.

=== Results ===
22 May 1955	Alianza Lima	3–0	Centro Iqueño	Estadio Nacional, Lima

22 May 1955	Universitario	3–2	Sporting Tabaco	Estadio Nacional, Lima

25 May 1955	Sporting Tabaco	1–6	Alianza Lima	Estadio Nacional, Lima

25 May 1955	Centro Iqueño	4–2	Universitario	Estadio Nacional, Lima

29 May 1955	Sporting Tabaco	1–0	Centro Iqueño	Estadio Nacional, Lima

29 May 1955	Alianza Lima	1–1	Universitario	Estadio Nacional, Lima

== 1956 Campeonato de Apertura ==
=== Standings ===
Pos	Team	Pld	W	D	L	GF	GA	GD	Pts	Qualification or relegation	ALI	UNI	IQU	CHA
1	Alianza Lima	3	3	0	0	10	5	+5	6	Champion		4–1		2–1
2	Universitario	3	2	0	1	5	4	+1	4				2–0	
3	Centro Iqueño	3	1	0	2	6	7	−1	2		3–4			
4	Atlético Chalaco	3	0	0	3	2	7	−5	0			0–2	1–3	

Legend: Blue = home team win; Yellow = draw; Red = away team win.
Rules for classification: 1) Points; 2) Goal difference; 3) Goals for; 4) Fair play points; 5) Drawing of lots.

=== Results ===
3 June 1956	Alianza Lima	2–1	Atlético Chalaco	Estadio Nacional, Lima

3 June 1956	Universitario	2–0	Centro Iqueño	Estadio Nacional, Lima

10 June 1956	Atlético Chalaco	0–2	Universitario	Estadio Nacional, Lima

10 June 1956	Centro Iqueño	3–4	Alianza Lima	Estadio Nacional, Lima

24 June 1956	Atlético Chalaco	1–3	Centro Iqueño	Estadio Nacional, Lima

24 June 1956	Alianza Lima	4–1	Universitario	Estadio Nacional, Lima
			Márquez

== 1957 Campeonato de Apertura ==
=== Standings ===
Pos	Team	Pld	W	D	L	GF	GA	GD	Pts	Qualification or relegation	MUN	CRI	UNI	ALI
1	Deportivo Municipal	3	2	0	1	5	4	+1	4	Champion			2–1	1–2
2	Sporting Cristal	3	1	1	1	7	5	+2	3		1–2			
3	Universitario	3	1	1	1	6	6	0	3			3–3		2–1
4	Alianza Lima	3	1	0	2	3	6	−3	2			0–3		

Legend: Blue = home team win; Yellow = draw; Red = away team win.
Rules for classification: 1) Points; 2) Goal difference; 3) Goals for; 4) Fair play points; 5) Drawing of lots.

=== Results ===
7 July 1957	Universitario	3–3	Sporting Cristal	Estadio Nacional, Lima

7 July 1957	Deportivo Municipal	1–2	Alianza Lima	Estadio Nacional, Lima

10 July 1957	Deportivo Municipal	2–1	Universitario	Estadio Nacional, Lima

10 July 1957	Alianza Lima	0–3	Sporting Cristal	Estadio Nacional, Lima

21 July 1957	Sporting Cristal	1–2	Deportivo Municipal	Estadio Nacional, Lima

21 July 1957	Universitario	2–1	Alianza Lima	Estadio Nacional, Lima

== 1958 Campeonato de Apertura ==
=== Standings ===
Pos	Team	Pld	W	D	L	GF	GA	GD	Pts	Qualification or relegation	CEN	CHA	UNI	ALI
1	Centro Iqueño	3	2	1	0	10	4	+6	5	Champion			5–0	2–2
2	Atlético Chalaco	3	1	1	1	5	5	0	3		2–3			
3	Universitario	3	1	1	1	4	7	−3	3			1–1		3–1
4	Alianza Lima	3	0	1	2	4	7	−3	1			1–2		

Legend: Blue = home team win; Yellow = draw; Red = away team win.
Rules for classification: 1) Points; 2) Goal difference; 3) Goals for; 4) Fair play points; 5) Drawing of lots.

=== Results ===
22 June 1958	Universitario	1–1	Atlético Chalaco	Estadio Nacional, Lima

22 June 1958	Centro Iqueño	2–2	Alianza Lima	Estadio Nacional, Lima

24 June 1958	Centro Iqueño	5–0	Universitario	Estadio Nacional, Lima

24 June 1958	Alianza Lima	1–2	Atlético Chalaco	Estadio Nacional, Lima

29 June 1958	Atlético Chalaco	2–3	Centro Iqueño	Estadio Nacional, Lima

29 June 1958	Universitario	3–1	Alianza Lima	Estadio Nacional, Lima

== 1959 Campeonato de Apertura ==
=== Standings ===
Pos	Team	Pld	W	D	L	GF	GA	GD	Pts	Qualification or relegation	SBA	ALI	UNI	CHA	CAS
1	Sport Boys	4	3	0	1	11	7	+4	6	Champion		1–2	2–1		
2	Alianza Lima	4	3	0	1	9	8	+1	6				2–6	2–0	
3	Universitario	4	1	2	1	10	7	+3	4					2–2	1–1
4	Atlético Chalaco	4	0	2	2	7	11	−4	2		3–5				2–2
5	Mariscal Castilla	4	0	2	2	5	9	−4	2		1–3	1–3			

Legend: Blue = home team win; Yellow = draw; Red = away team win.
Rules for classification: 1) Points; 2) Goal difference; 3) Goals for; 4) Fair play points; 5) Drawing of lots.

=== Results ===
7 June 1959	Alianza Lima	2–0	Atlético Chalaco	Estadio Nacional, Lima

7 June 1959	Sport Boys	2–1	Universitario	Estadio Nacional, Lima

10 June 1959	Atlético Chalaco	2–2	Mariscal Castilla	Estadio Nacional, Lima

10 June 1959	Sport Boys	1–2	Alianza Lima	Estadio Nacional, Lima

14 June 1959	Atlético Chalaco	3–5	Sport Boys	Estadio Nacional, Lima

14 June 1959	Universitario	1–1	Mariscal Castilla	Estadio Nacional, Lima

17 June 1959	Universitario	2–2	Atlético Chalaco	Estadio Nacional, Lima

17 June 1959	Mariscal Castilla	1–3	Alianza Lima	Estadio Nacional, Lima

21 June 1959	Mariscal Castilla	1–3	Sport Boys	Estadio Nacional, Lima

21 June 1959	Alianza Lima	2–6	Universitario	Estadio Nacional, Lima

== 1960 Campeonato de Apertura ==
=== Standings ===
Pos	Team	Pld	W	D	L	GF	GA	GD	Pts	Qualification or relegation	SBA	CEN	MUN	CIC
1	Sport Boys	3	2	1	0	6	3	+3	5	Champion		2–2		
2	Centro Iqueño	3	1	2	0	8	6	+2	4				2–2	4–2
3	Deportivo Municipal	3	1	1	1	7	6	+1	3		1–3			4–1
4	Ciclista Lima	3	0	0	3	3	9	−6	0		0–1			

Legend: Blue = home team win; Yellow = draw; Red = away team win.
Rules for classification: 1) Points; 2) Goal difference; 3) Goals for; 4) Fair play points; 5) Drawing of lots.

=== Results ===
26 June 1960	Deportivo Municipal	4–1	Ciclista Lima	Estadio Nacional, Lima

26 June 1960	Sport Boys	2–2	Centro Iqueño	Estadio Nacional, Lima

3 July 1960	Centro Iqueño	4–2	Ciclista Lima	Estadio Nacional, Lima

3 July 1960	Deportivo Municipal	1–3	Sport Boys	Estadio Nacional, Lima

24 July 1960	Centro Iqueño	2–2	Deportivo Municipal	Estadio Nacional, Lima

24 July 1960	Ciclista Lima	0–1	Sport Boys	Estadio Nacional, Lima

== 1961 Campeonato de Apertura ==
=== Standings ===
Pos	Team	Pld	W	D	L	GF	GA	GD	Pts	Qualification or relegation	CRI	UNI	MUN	SBA	IQU
1	Sporting Cristal	4	3	1	0	12	6	+6	7	Champion			6–2		2–2
2	Universitario	4	2	0	2	6	5	+1	4		1–2			2–0	
3	Deportivo Municipal	4	2	0	2	8	9	−1	4			3–0			1–0
4	Sport Boys	4	2	0	2	7	8	−1	4		1–2		3–2		
5	Centro Iqueño	4	0	1	3	4	9	−5	1			0–3		2–3	

Legend: Blue = home team win; Yellow = draw; Red = away team win.
Rules for classification: 1) Points; 2) Goal difference; 3) Goals for; 4) Fair play points; 5) Drawing of lots.

=== Results ===
25 June 1961	Sporting Cristal	2–2	Centro Iqueño	Estadio Nacional, Lima

25 June 1961	Universitario	2–0	Sport Boys	Estadio Nacional, Lima

29 June 1961	Centro Iqueño	0–3	Universitario	Estadio Nacional, Lima

29 June 1961	Sport Boys	3–2	Deportivo Municipal	Estadio Nacional, Lima

1 July 1961	Deportivo Municipal	1–0	Centro Iqueño	Estadio Nacional, Lima

1 July 1961	Universitario	1–2	Sporting Cristal	Estadio Nacional, Lima

5 July 1961	Sporting Cristal	6–2	Deportivo Municipal	Estadio Nacional, Lima

5 July 1961	Centro Iqueño	2–3	Sport Boys	Estadio Nacional, Lima

9 July 1961	Deportivo Municipl	3–0	Universitario	Estadio Nacional, Lima

9 July 1961	Sport Boys	1–2	Sporting Cristal	Estadio Nacional, Lima

== 1963 Campeonato de Apertura ==
=== Standings ===
Pos	Team	Pld	W	D	L	GF	GA	GD	Pts	Qualification or relegation	ALI	CRI	UNI	IQU
1	Alianza Lima	3	3	0	0	6	1	+5	6	Champion		2–1	1–0	
2	Sporting Cristal	3	2	0	1	5	4	+1	4				3–2	1–0
3	Universitario	3	0	1	2	3	5	−2	1					1–1
4	Centro Iqueño	3	0	1	2	1	5	−4	1		0–3			

Legend: Blue = home team win; Yellow = draw; Red = away team win.
Rules for classification: 1) Points; 2) Goal difference; 3) Goals for; 4) Fair play points; 5) Drawing of lots.

=== Results ===
23 June 1963	Universitario	1–1	Centro Iqueño	Estadio Nacional, Lima
13:30	Jorge Fernández 42' (pen.)		Walter Cossío 16'	Referee: Héctor Hernández

23 June 1963	Alianza Lima	2–1	Sporting Cristal	Estadio Nacional, Lima
15:30	Víctor Zegarra 19'; Orlando La Torre 39' (o.g.)		Hugo Lobatón 16'	Attendance: 10,882; Referee: Tejada

7 July 1963	Sporting Cristal	3–2	Universitario	Lima

7 July 1963	Centro Iqueño	0–3	Alianza Lima	Lima

14 July 1963	Sporting Cristal	1–0	Centro Iqueño	Lima

14 July 1963	Alianza Lima	1–0	Universitario	Lima

== 1969 Campeonato de Apertura ==
=== Standings ===
Pos	Team	Pld	W	D	L	GF	GA	GD	Pts	Qualification or relegation	UNI	ALI	CRI	AUR
1	Universitario	3	3	0	0	8	4	+4	6	Champion			3–2	
2	Alianza Lima	3	1	1	1	6	4	+2	3		1–2			4–1
3	Sporting Cristal	2	0	1	1	3	4	−1	1			1–1		—
4	Juan Aurich	2	0	0	2	2	7	−5	0		1–3			

Legend: Blue = home team win; Yellow = draw; Red = away team win.
Rules for classification: 1) Points; 2) Goal difference; 3) Goals for; 4) Fair play points; 5) Drawing of lots.

=== Results ===
13 April 1969	Universitario	3–2	Sporting Cristal	Estadio Teodoro Lolo Fernández, Lima

13 April 1969	Alianza Lima	4–1	Juan Aurich	Estadio Teodoro Lolo Fernández, Lima
	Pedro Pablo León 25' 43'; Víctor Zegarra 48'; Teófilo Cubillas 80'		Gómez 41'	Referee: Ernesto La Fuente

20 April 1969	Juan Aurich	1–3	Universitario	Lima

20 April 1969	Sporting Cristal	1–1	Alianza Lima	Estadio Nacional, Lima
	Tadeo Risco 18'		Teófilo Cubillas 39'	Referee: Oscar Ferreyra

23 April 1969	Sporting Cristal	–	Juan Aurich	Estadio Nacional, Lima

23 April 1969	Alianza Lima	1–2	Universitario	Estadio Nacional, Lima
	Teófilo Cubillas 68'		Roberto Chale 24'; Hernan Castañeda 65'

== See also ==
- Torneo Relámpago
