= Adelfo Magallanes =

Peruvian footballer (1910–1988)

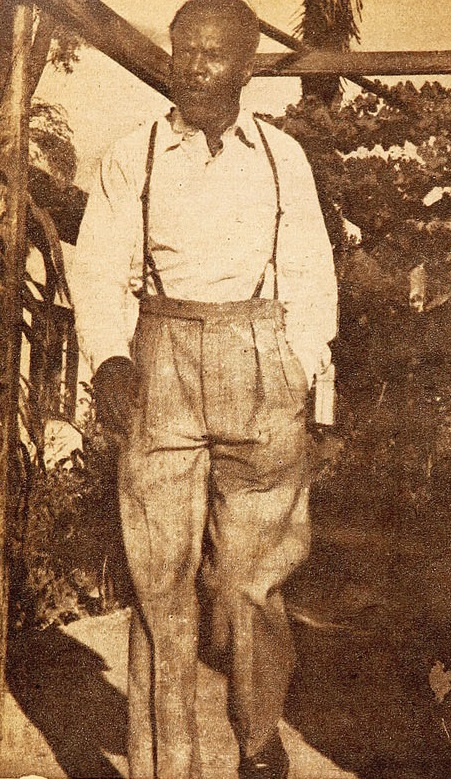

Personal information
- Full name: Adelfo Magallanes Campos
- Date of birth: August 29, 1910
- Place of birth: San Vicente de Cañete, Peru
- Date of death: 16 January 1988 (aged 77)
- Place of death: Lima, Peru
- Height: 1.80 m (5 ft 11 in)
- Position: Forward

Youth career
- 1928: Alianza Lima

Senior career*
Years	Team	Apps	(Gls)
1930–1944	Alianza Lima	144	(32)

International career
1936–1942	Peru	22	(4)

Managerial career
- 1946–1948: Alianza Lima
- 1949–1950: Deportivo Cali
- 1951: América de Cali
- 1954–1956: Alianza Lima
- * Club domestic league appearances and goals

Adelfo Magallanes Campos (Note: In this Spanish name, the first or paternal surname is Magallanes and the second or maternal family name is Campos.) (29 August 1910 – 16 January 1988) was a Peruvian footballer. He was part of the first golden era of the Peru national football team.

== Playing career ==
=== Club ===
Born in Cañete, Magallanes developed his footballing skills as part of Alianza Lima, and became an important part of the famed Rodillo Negro era of the club. Nicknamed El Bólido, he played in the interior right and became the replacement of Alberto Montellanos in the Rodillo Negro.

=== International ===
His skill did not go unnoticed, and was soon called up to participate in the 1936 Summer Olympics held in Berlin. He earned a total of 22 caps, scoring 4 goals.

== Managerial career ==
After retiring from playing, he became Alianza Lima's coach in two periods (1946–52 and 1954–56), and in-between those periods he went to manage in Colombia. He is the coach with which Alianza Lima has won the most titles (four: 1948, 1952, 1954, and 1955). Adelfo Magallanes died in 1988 at the age of 77.

Temporadas en Alianza Lima: 1930-44 (77 partidos, 16 goles). Títulos: Tres en Primera (1931,32,33) y uno en segunda división (1939).
