= Atlético Lusitania =

Peruvian football club

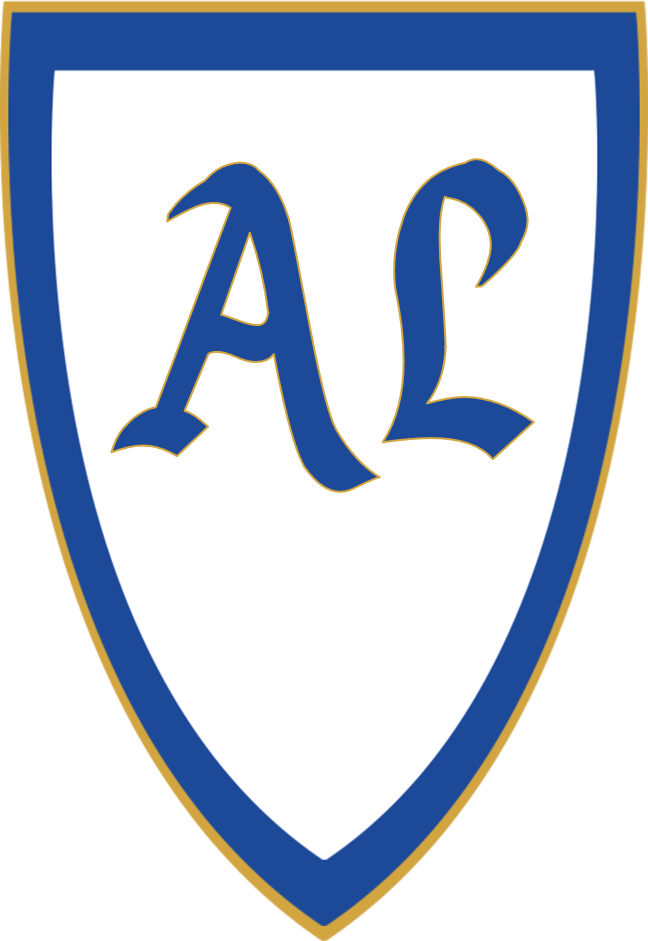
- Full name: Club Atlético Lusitania
- Founded: 12 October 1922
- League: Copa Peru
Home colours

Atlético Lusitania was a Peruvian football club, playing in the city of Barrios Altos, Lima District, Lima, Peru.

== History ==
Atlético Lusitania was founded on October 18, 1922, at 661 Coronel Zubiaga Street in Barrios Altos, and its first president was Jesús Yancari. The club competed in the División Intermedia from 1927 to 1931, when it was relegated to the Segunda División Provincial de Lima (third tier).

In 1941, the Liga Regional de Lima y Callao was established, and Lusitania joined its top division. The club won the 1944 Primera División Regional de Lima y Callao title after defeating other prominent sides of the era such as Unión Callao, KDT Nacional, and Juventud Gloria. Alongside Unión Callao, they secured promotion to the 1945 Peruvian Segunda División.

In 1951, Lusitania challenged for the Segunda División title against Association Chorrillos but lost 6–1 in the title playoff. In the 1953 season, they once again finished as runners-up, this time behind Carlos Concha. In 1957, the club finished bottom of the table alongside Defensor Arica and, after losing 2–1 in a relegation playoff, was demoted to the Liga Provincial de Lima for the 1958 season.

In 1958, Lusitania won the Liga Provincial de Lima title but was eliminated in the Triangular de Ascenso by San Antonio de Miraflores. The club claimed another league title in 1962 and, after winning the promotion playoff group, returned to the Peruvian Segunda División in 1963. They remained in the second tier until 1966, when they were relegated after losing a playoff against Juventud Gloria.

In the following years, Lusitania competed in the Liga Distrital de Cercado de Lima until its eventual dissolution.

== Honours ==
=== Senior titles ===
Keys

- Record
- ^{(s)} Shared record

Type	Competition	Titles	Runner-up	Winning years	Runner-up years
National (League)	Segunda División	—	3	—	1945, 1951, 1953
Regional (League)	Liguilla de Ascenso a Segunda División	1	1	1962	1958
Regional (League)	Primera División Amateur de Lima	2	—	1958, 1962	—
Regional (League)	Primera División Regional de Lima y Callao	1	1	1944	1943
Regional (League)	División Intermedia	1	—	1937	—
Regional (League)	Liga Distrital de Cercado de Lima	1	—	1979	—
Regional (League)	Segunda División Amateur de Lima	—	1	—	1926 A.D. Barrios Altos

== See also ==
- List of football clubs in Peru
- Peruvian football league system
