= Unión América =

- Full name: Club Unión América
- Founded: July 4, 1928
- Dissolved: 1988
- League: Copa Perú
Home colours

Unión América was a Peruvian football club, that played in the city of Lima, Peru.

== History ==
The club Unión América was founded on Lima.

Unión América, in 1928, took part in the Tercera División Provincial de Lima, in the first group. In the following years, it gradually progressed through the upper divisions, although the structure of the Peruvian league system changed over time.

Unión América won the Liga Provincial de Lima title in 1954 and was promoted to the Peruvian Segunda División for the 1955 season, where it finished third. The following year, it was runner-up.

In the 1958 Peruvian Segunda División, it won the championship and earned promotion to the 1959 Peruvian Primera División; however, it was relegated in that same season.

The club returned to the Second Division for the 1960 season and competed for several more years until it was relegated in 1968 season, dropping to the Liga Provincial de Lima. Unión América later descended again and returned to its league of origin. It ultimately continued participating in the Third District Division of Lima until 1987.

== Statistics and results in First Division ==
=== League history ===
Season	Div.	Pos.	Pl.	W	D	L	GF	GA	P	Notes
1959	1st	10	22	5	4	13	21	44	14	10/10 Regular Season

== Honours ==
=== Senior titles ===
Keys

- Record
- ^{(s)} Shared record

Type	Competition	Titles	Runner-up	Winning years	Runner-up years
National (League)	Segunda División	1	1	1958	1956
Regional (League)	Liguilla de Ascenso a Segunda División	1	—	1954	—
Regional (League)	Primera División Amateur de Lima	3	—	1952, 1953, 1954	—
Regional (League)	Segunda División Amateur de Lima	2	—	1932 Zona Este, 1951 Serie B	—
Regional (League)	Tercera División Amateur de Lima	1	1	1928 AD Barrios Altos	1931 Zona Lima
Regional (League)	Tercera División Regional de Lima y Callao	—	1	—	1949

== See also ==
- List of football clubs in Peru
- Peruvian football league system
