= Association Chorrillos =

Peruvian football club

- Full name: Club Association Chorrillos
- Founded: 20 August 1934
- League: Copa Perú
Home colours

Association Chorrillos was a Peruvian football (soccer) club based in the city of Chorrillos, Lima, Peru. The club competed in several seasons in the Peruvian Segunda División and achieved promotion to the Peruvian Primera División. The club retains its public registry under No. 01772376.

== History ==
The club was founded by a group of students from School No. 443 in the district of Chorrillos, Lima. In 1951, it won the 1951 Peruvian Segunda División championship. It competed in the Peruvian Primera División in 1952 but was relegated in the same year.

The club returned to the Peruvian Segunda División, where it played from 1953 to 1958. In 1958, it was relegated again, this time dropping to the Liga de los Balnearios del Sur.

With the sponsorship of the Nicolini company, the club was renamed Nicolini Chorrillos within a few years. In 1960, it won the Liga de los Balnearios del Sur and later the 1960 Triangular de Ascenso against Telmo Carbajo and Alianza Libertad, earning promotion back to the Second Division for the 1961 season.

After being relegated in 1963, the club returned to the Liga de los Balnearios del Sur the following year, where it won the title in 1964 and 1965 but failed to secure promotion through the quadrangular playoff.

The club won the Liga de los Balnearios del Sur again in 1972 but finished in the bottom positions of the 1972 Hexagonal de Ascenso, missing out on promotion to the Peruvian Segunda División.

Following the dissolution of the Liga de Balnearios, the club became part of the Liga Distrital de Chorrillos. At times, it used the name Association Nicolini, although it generally retained its original name.

In 2003, the club reached the final stage of the Liga Provincial de Lima (Interligas), where promotion to the Second Division was at stake. However, it failed to advance from its group after losing out to San José Joyeros de Lince and returned to its league of origin.

In the 2005 season, Association Chorrillos, also known as Nicolini Chorrillos, was relegated to the Chorrillos Second Division. It eventually dropped to the Third District Division and later ceased participating in official competitions.

== Statistics and results in First Division ==
=== League history ===
Season	Div.	Pos.	Pl.	W	D	L	GF	GA	P	Notes
1952	1st	10	18	3	3	12	22	55	9	10/10 Regular Season

== Honours ==
=== Senior titles ===
Keys

- Record
- ^{(s)} Shared record

Type	Competition	Titles	Runner-up	Winning years	Runner-up years
National (League)	Segunda División	1	2	1951	1950, 1961
Regional (League)	Liguilla de Promoción a Segunda División	1	—	1960	—
Regional (League)	Liga de los Balnearios del Sur	4	3	1960, 1964, 1965, 1972	1959, 1966, 1967
Regional (League)	Liga Distrital de Chorrillos	1	—	2003	—
Regional (League)	Primera División Regional de Lima y Callao	—	1	—	1945
Regional (League)	Segunda División Regional de Lima y Callao	1	—	1942 Serie A	—
Regional (League)	Tercera División Regional de Lima y Callao	—	1	—	1941

== See also ==
- List of football clubs in Peru
- Peruvian football league system
