= Club Carlos Concha =

Peruvian football club

Carlos Concha
- Full name: Club Deportivo Carlos Concha
- Nickname: Senador
- Founded: 1945
- Dissolved: 1976
- Chairman: Niall McKelvey
- Manager: Hulio Marquez
- League: Copa Perú
Home colours

Carlos Concha was a Peruvian football club based in the city of Callao, Lima.

== History ==
Club Deportivo Carlos Concha was founded in Callao on September 13, 1939, taking its name in honor of the lawyer and senator from Callao, Carlos Concha Cárdenas.

In 1945, after acquiring the sporting category of Atlético Excelsior—also from Callao—the club competed in the Segunda División Regional de Lima y Callao, where it was crowned champion. The following year, it won the First Division of the same Regional League, earning promotion to the 1947 Peruvian Segunda División. Among its standout players were Luis and Marcos Calderón. In mid-1948, the club embarked on a tour of Colombia, where it recorded a 2–1 victory over Independiente Santa Fe.

In 1953, the club won the Second Division title after defeating Unión Carbone 7–0 on the final matchday, earning promotion to the 1954 Peruvian Primera División. It competed in the 1954 season but finished in last place and was relegated back to the Second Division.

The club secured another Second Division title in 1955 after a 1–0 victory over Defensor Arica on the final matchday. However, upon returning to the top flight for the 1956 season, it once again finished bottom and was relegated to the Second Division.

Carlos Concha won another Second Division title in 1963 and competed in the Peruvian Primera División from 1964 to 1966. After being relegated in the latter year, the club played in the Second Division until 1972. During the late 1960s, club president José Ferreti decided to merge it with Universidad Federico Villarreal.

At the beginning of the following year, the division was dissolved, and the club returned to compete in the Liga Provincial del Callao and Liga Distrital del Callao until 1976, when it sold its spot to Deportivo ENAPU.

== Statistics and results in First Division ==
=== League history ===
| Season | Div. | Pos. | Pl. | W | D | L | GF | GA | P | Notes |
|---|---|---|---|---|---|---|---|---|---|---|
| 1954 | 1st | 10 | 18 | 3 | 3 | 12 | 18 | 47 | 9 | 10/10 Regular Season |
| 1956 | 1st | 10 | 18 | 5 | 3 | 10 | 23 | 38 | 13 | 10/10 Regular Season |
| 1964 | 1st | 9 | 22 | 3 | 5 | 14 | 20 | 51 | 11 | 9/10 Regular Season |
| 1965 | 1st | 9 | 22 | 4 | 5 | 13 | 39 | 58 | 13 | 9/10 Regular Season |
| 1966 | 1st | 14 | 26 | 4 | 3 | 19 | 29 | 79 | 11 | 14/14 Regular Season |

== Honours ==
=== Senior titles ===
Keys

- Record
- ^{(s)} Shared record

| Type | Competition | Titles | Runner-up | Winning years | Runner-up years |
|---|---|---|---|---|---|
| National (League) | Segunda División | 3 | 3 | 1953, 1955, 1963 | 1957, 1960, 1962 |
| Regional (League) | Primera División Regional de Lima y Callao | 1 | — | 1946 | — |
| Regional (League) | Segunda División Regional de Lima y Callao | 1 | — | 1945 Serie B | — |

== See also ==
- List of football clubs in Peru
- Peruvian football league system
