= Juan José Ávalos =

Peruvian footballer (1948–2024)

Personal information
- Full name: Juan José Ávalos Veramatos
- Date of birth: 7 October 1948
- Place of birth: Jesús María District, Lima, Peru
- Date of death: 4 May 2024 (aged 75)
- Place of death: Peru
- Height: 1.77 m (5 ft 10 in)
- Position: Left forward

Senior career*
Years	Team	Apps	(Gls)
1964–1969	Defensor Lima		
1970–1971	Defensor Arica		
1972	SIMA		
1973–1975	Alianza Lima		
1976	Melgar		
1977–1978	Defensor Lima		
1979	León de Huánuco		
1980–1981	Deportivo Junín		
Total			(108)
- * Club domestic league appearances and goals

Juan José Ávalos Veramatos (7 October 1948 – 4 May 2024) was a Peruvian footballer. Nicknamed "J.J." or "Lora", he played as a forward for Defensor Arica, Alianza Lima and Defensor Lima throughout the 1970s, winning the 1975 Torneo Descentralizado with Alianza Lima.

== Club career ==
Known for his talents as an left forward, Ávalos found himself making his senior debut at the age of 16 for Defensor Lima during the 1964 Peruvian Primera División. He remained with the club throughout the remainder of the 1960s with their highest performance being during the 1965 Peruvian Primera División. During the 1970 Torneo Descentralizado, he began playing for Defensor Arica alongside his former Defensor Lima teammates such as Carlos Urrunaga and Carlos Oliva. Following a brief stint with SIMA for 1972 Torneo Descentralizado, he began playing for Alianza Lima the following season and remained in the club throughout the following two seasons with Ávalos winning the 1975 Torneo Descentralizado as his only title. Notably, Ávalos served as the first ever home goalscorer at the newly established Estadio Alejandro Villanueva on 28 December 1974 as part of the first round of the 1974 Señor de los Milagros against Nacional where Ávalos scored the initial equalizer at the 29th minute Ávalos later returned for Defensor Lima following a brief stint with Melgar in 1976 for an additional two seasons. The remainder of his career was spent with León de Huánuco and Deportivo Junín throughout the early 1980s before retiring following the 1981 Torneo Descentralizado.
