= Francisco Gonzales (footballer) =

Peruvian footballer (1947–2008)

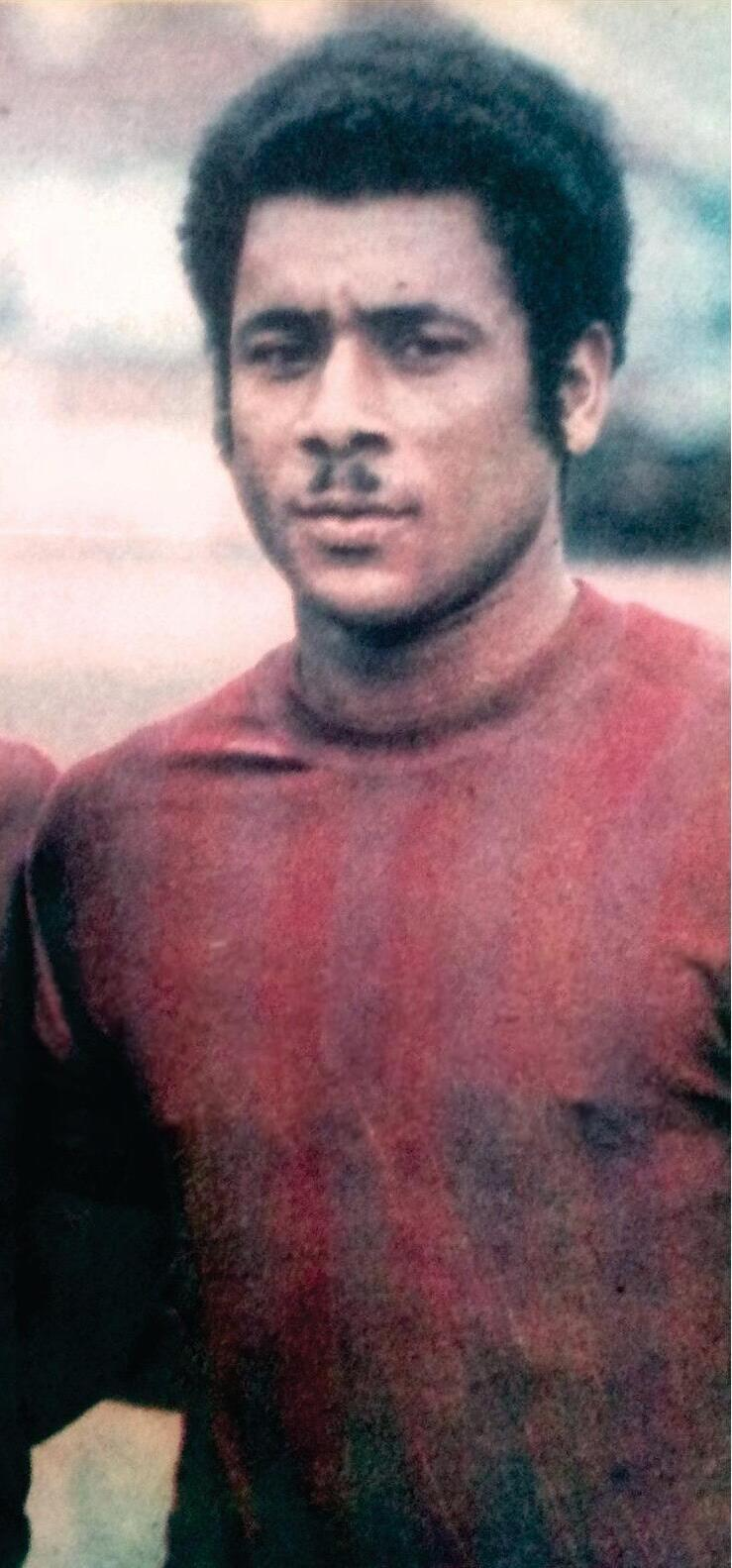
- Gonzales in 1973

Personal information
- Full name: Francisco Gonzales León
- Date of birth: 28 March 1947
- Place of birth: Lima, Lima Province, Peru
- Date of death: 29 September 2008 (aged 61)
- Place of death: Lima, Lima Province, Peru
- Height: 1.81 m (5 ft 11 in)
- Position: Center forward

Senior career*
Years	Team	Apps	(Gls)
1967–1968	Defensor Lima		
1969	Sporting Cristal		
1970	Defensor Lima		
1971–1972	Juan Aurich		
1973–1975	Defensor Lima		
1976	Unión Huaral		
1977–1978	Defensor Lima		
1979–1983	Alfonso Ugarte		
- * Club domestic league appearances and goals

Francisco Gonzales León (28 March 1947 – 29 September 2008) was a Peruvian footballer. Nicknamed "Pancho", he played as a center forward for various clubs throughout the 1970s, primarily playing for Defensor Lima. He was also known for being within the top 20 goalscorers in the history of the Liga 1, scoring 146 throughout his career.

== Career ==
He began his career with Defensor Lima in 1967, playing alongside players such as Juan José Ávalos, Carlos Oliva Sosa and Carlos Urrunaga. In his inaugural season he became the top goalscorer for both is club and ranked second place in the top scorers for the 1967 Torneo Descentralizado, losing out by one goal to Pedro Pablo León's 14 goals. In 1968, he was approached by Universidad de Chile to play for them but he personally declined the offer. He later played for Sporting Cristal for the 1969 season and played in the 1969 Copa Libertadores, finishing the season with four goals. He later transferred to Juan Aurich where due to the persuasion of the club manager, who ended up getting him and eight other players to sign up for the season.

He later returned to Defensor Lima to later be a part of the winning squad in the club's first national title, as well as serving as a source of inspiration for the younger players in the season. He would also be the top goalscorer for both the 1972 and the 1973 Torneo Descentralizado. He played with the club twice, spanning from 1973 to 1975 and 1977 to 1978 as he consistently achieved high results with the club as well as being an excellent header with the press at the time considering him one of the best headers in all of South America. This was interrupted with a brief spell for Unión Huaral in 1976 when the club earned their first title but Gonzales wasn't the top scorer for the club, losing out to Alejandro Luces. He finished his career with Alfonso Ugarte before retiring after the 1983 Torneo Descentralizado with the club narrowly missing out on relegation with the following season serving as a coach for the club.

He ultimately scored 150 goals, with 69 of those being for Defensor Lima.
