= 1976 FBC Melgar season =

FBC Melgar
1976 season
- Stadium: Estadio Mariano Melgar
- Torneo Descentralizado: Torneo Decentralizado League: Tenth (10°); Tenth National (10°)
Home colours	Away colours	Third colours

The 1976 FBC Melgar season was the club's 62nd season since its foundation in 1915. Seven (7) participations in the top-flight of Peruvian Primera División (of 60 Editions) with denomination Torneo Descentralizado. In Previous Season the club qualified as 4th Place of the 1975 Torneo Descentralizado.

Melgar were one of sixteen (16) clubs in the Eleventh edition (11.º) Torneo Descentralizado, the competition most important of the Peruvian football. The club played the Peruvian Primera División for Seventh (7th) Time.

== Torneo Descentralizado ==
=== Torneo Descentralizado League ===
Pos	Team	Pld	W	D	L	GF	GA	GD	Pts
9	CNI	30	10	9	11	30	34	-4	29
10	FBC Melgar	30	10	9	11	45	52	-7	29
11	Alfonso Ugarte	30	10	6	14	46	43	+3	26

== See also ==
- FBC Melgar
- 1976 Torneo Descentralizado
