= Mario Núñez Izurriaga =

Peruvian footballer (born 1950)

Personal information
- Full name: Mario Núñez Izurriaga
- Date of birth: 1950 (age 75–76)
- Place of birth: Arequipa, Arequipa, Peru
- Position: Forward

Senior career*
Years	Team	Apps	(Gls)
1966–1981	Sportivo Huracán		

Managerial career
- 2008–2009: Sportivo Huracán
- * Club domestic league appearances and goals

Mario Núñez Izurriaga (born 1950) is a retired Peruvian football player and manager. Nicknamed "Ratín", he played as a forward for Sportivo Huracán throughout the 1970s, being recognized for being one of the primary contributors for the club reaching the top-flight of Peruvian football.

== Career ==
Born in La Pampilla neighborhood of Arequipa, Núñez Izurriaga began his career by playing for Sportivo Huracán at the age of sixteen for the 1966 Tercera División with his uncle, Garrincha Portugal, also playing within Arequipa. He obtained his nickname from 1966 FIFA World Cup Argentine captain Antonio Rattín as whilst he would be expulsed during the knockout match against England, Núñez would be expulsed three times throughout the tournament which led to his teammate Duilio Gonzales coining the nickname. Despite the club being one of the earliest to represent Arequipa, it had not seen a major promotion since its inception. Throughout his career, he would play with other players such as Peruvian international Julio Aparicio during the club's 1973 season in the 1973 Copa Perú. The club would end up winning the championship and for the first time in the club's history, play in the top flight of Peruvian football. Though the club would only play in the 1973 Torneo Descentralizado before it was relegated once more, it would prove to be a significant event in the history of the club as for the next couple of seasons, the club would find relative success including making the finals of the 1975 and 1981 Copa Perú. Núñez would continue play for Sportivo Huracán for the remainder of his career as despite several offers from Melgar to play for them, he personally wouldn't play the sport for monetary reasons.

== Later life ==
He would later go on to return to his club of Sportivo Huracán for the 2008 and 2009 seasons as manager until being replaced by the Argentine nationalized Peruvian, Ariel Paz. Núñez Izurriaga later married Isabel Delgado and had two children with her: María Lourdes and Mario Núñez Delgado who would later become president of the club in 2022 as a part of the club's 95th anniversary. Núñez Izurriaga himself was present alongside other former players of the club.

== See also ==
- List of one-club men in association football
