= Enrique Rodríguez (footballer) =

Peruvian footballer (1939–2009)

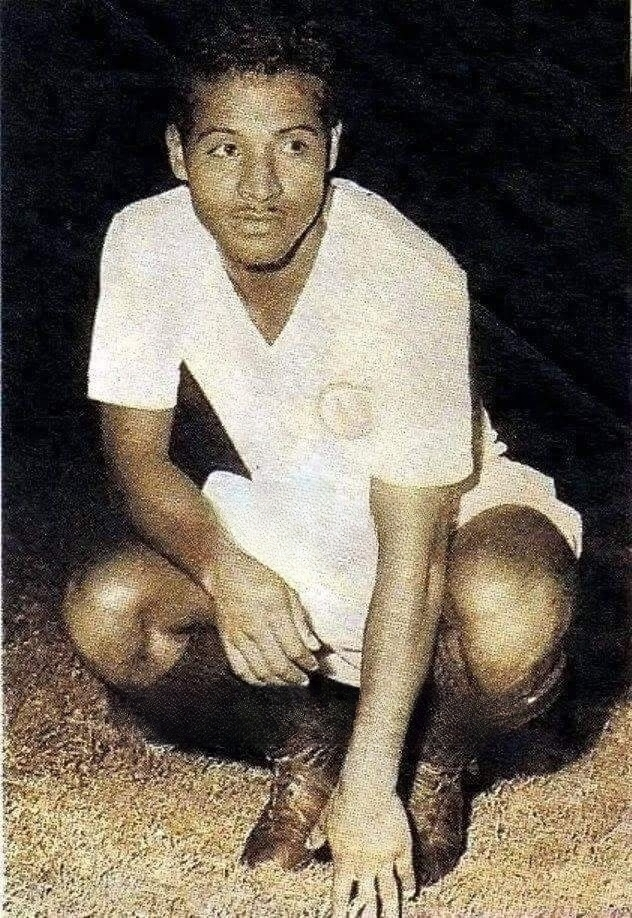

Personal information
- Full name: Enrique Moisés Rodríguez Piña
- Date of birth: 15 July 1939
- Place of birth: Lima, Department of Lima, Peru
- Date of death: 9 January 2009 (aged 69)
- Place of death: Lima, Lima Province, Peru
- Position: Forward

Senior career*
Years	Team	Apps	(Gls)
1961–1963	Mariscal Sucre		
1964–1970	Universitario de Deportes	148	(25)
1971–1972	Deportivo Municipal		
1973	SIMA		

International career
1965	Peru	1	(0)
- * Club domestic league appearances and goals

Enrique Moisés Rodríguez Piña (15 July 1939 – 9 January 2009) was a Peruvian footballer. Nicknamed "El Ronco", he played as a forward for Universitario de Deportes and Deportivo Municipal throughout the 1960s and early 1970s. He also briefly played for Peru internationally for the 1965 Copa del Pacífico.

== Club career ==
Rodríguez would begin his career by playing for Mariscal Sucre from 1961 to 1963. He later played for Universitario de Deportes beginning in 1964 where he would be a part of the main offensive alongside other players such as Ángel Uribe and Enrique Casaretto. He was trademarked by the use of his left foot with a notable instance of this being during the 1967 Copa Libertadores on 13 June in an away match against River Plate where he his form would subserve goalkeeper Hugo Gatti and score the only goal in the match. His first season with the club would result in him being part of the winning squad for the 1964 Peruvian Primera División. Throughout his career, he would be part of the winning squads for the 1966, 1967 and 1969 editions of the tournament.

He would leave the club following the 1970 season due to Oswaldo Ramírez being the more preferred player in the left field due to being younger as well as his successes in the 1970 FIFA World Cup qualifiers which would see Peru return to a World Cup finals in 40 years. He would then play for Deportivo Municipal in 1971 and 1972 before retiring following the 1973 Torneo Descentralizado with SIMA where the club would be relegated from the top-flight of Peruvian football.

== International career ==
He would play in one match for Peru during the second home match in the 1965 Copa del Pacífico where it would end in a 1–0 loss for Peru.
