= Enrique Rodríguez =

Enrique Rodríguez may refer to:

- Enrique Rodríguez Ballesteros (fl. 1950s–1960s), Chilean diplomat and politician
- Enrique Rodríguez (boxer) (1951–2022), Olympic boxer from Spain
- Enrique Rodríguez Carmona (1865–1924), Chilean lawyer and politician
- Enrique Rodríguez Fabregat (1895–1976), Uruguayan diplomat and politician
- Enrique Rodríguez (footballer) (1939–2009), Peruvian footballer
- Enrique Rodríguez Galindo (1939–2021), brigadier-general in the Spanish Civil Guard
- Enrique Rodríguez Larreta (1875–1961), Argentine writer, academic and diplomat
- Enrique Rodríguez Mac Iver (1874–1941), Chilean politician and academic
- Enrique Rodríguez Negrón (1933–2022), Puerto Rican judge and senator
- Enrique Rodríguez (rugby union) (born 1952), Argentine and Australian rugby union international
- Enrique Rodríguez Uresti (born 1962), Mexican politician
- Enrique Rodríguez Velásquez (1881–1940), Chilean lawyer and politician
- Enrique Ramos Rodríguez (born 1932), Mexican politician
