= Juan del Águila (footballer) =

Peruvian footballer (born 1952)

Personal information
- Full name: Juan Miguel del Águila Salazar
- Date of birth: 2 November 1952 (age 73)
- Place of birth: Iquitos, Loreto, Peru
- Height: 1.74 m (5 ft 9 in)
- Position: Forward

Senior career*
Years	Team	Apps	(Gls)
1969–1972	Deportivo Municipal		
1973–1975	CNI de Iquitos		
1976	Universitario de Deportes		
1977–1982	CNI de Iquitos		

International career
1971	Peru U20	9	(0)
- * Club domestic league appearances and goals

Juan Miguel del Águila Salazar (born 2 November 1952) is a retired Peruvian footballer. He played as a forward for Deportivo Municipal and Colegio Nacional Iquitos throughout the 1970s. He also represented Peru internationally for the 1971 South American U-20 Championship.

== Club career ==
Del Águila was born in Iquitos during a time in where there the town hadn't produced any notable footballers. He began his football career with the football team of his school Gran Unidad Mariano Melgar de Lima alongside his childhood friend Augusto Palacios. Following his admittance into the youth sector of Deportivo Municipal, he'd be promoted to the senior squad for the 1969 Torneo Descentralizado and played alongside other players such as Hugo Sotil and Manuel Mellán. He'd play for La Academia until the 1972 Torneo Descentralizado as he returned to his home city of Iquitos to play for CNI de Iquitos in the subsequent season. Following a brief stint with Universitario de Deportes in their 1976 season, he remained with Iquitos for the rest of his career. He'd achieve some highlights with the club such as being part of the initial winning squad of the 1977 Torneo Descentralizado as well as play in a 1–1 friendly against Unión de Santa Fe where he faced off against players such as Rubén Suñé, Hugo Gatti, Leopoldo Luque and played alongside players such as Bernabé Navarro. He'd retire at 29 years of age following the 1982 Copa Perú.

== International career ==
He represented Peru during the 1971 South American U-20 Championship after being selected from around 400 different candidates. He'd play alongside players such as Juan Carlos Oblitas, José Velásquez, Augusto Palacios, Arturo Bisetti, Moisés Palacios and César Echeandía as the team would make moderate success in the tournament, reaching the semi-finals. He was also the top goalscorer for the tournament.

== Later life ==
Following his football career, he proceeded to work for Petroperú. He remains an adamant supporter and club legend for CNI following his career with his desire of seeing the club return to the top-flight of Peruvian football.
