= Jaime Mosquera =

Peruvian footballer (1946–2025)

Personal information
- Full name: Jaime Mosquera Reyes
- Date of birth: 27 July 1946
- Place of birth: Lima, Peru
- Date of death: 16 January 2025 (aged 78)
- Position: Forward

Senior career*
Years	Team	Apps	(Gls)
- Independiente Sacachispas
1966	Carlos Concha		
1967	Centro Iqueño		
1968	Octavio Espinosa		
1969–1970	Deportivo Municipal		
1970–1971	Sporting CP	3	(1)
1971	Defensor Lima		
1972	Cienciano		
- * Club domestic league appearances and goals

Jaime Mosquera Reyes (27 July 1946 – 16 January 2025) was a Peruvian professional footballer who played as forward.

== Playing career ==
Jaime Mosquera made his name at Deportivo Municipal in 1969. He led the team's attack, alongside Hugo Sotil and Nemesio Mosquera, and finished as the top scorer that season with 15 goals.

Transferred in 1970 to Sporting CP, he struggled to establish himself and played only three matches (scoring one goal). He returned to Peru and signed with Defensor Lima in 1971. He finished his career playing for Cienciano in 1972.

He died on 16 January 2025 at the age of 78.

== Honours ==
Deportivo Municipal

- Torneo Descentralizado Top scorer: 1969 (15 goals)
