= 1968 Peruvian Segunda División =

Peruvian Segunda División
- Season: 1968
- Dates: 1968 – 22 October 1968
- Champions: Deportivo Municipal
- Runner up: ADO
- Relegated: Unión América
- Matches: 90
- Top goalscorer: Hugo Sotil (14 goals)

The 1968 Peruvian Segunda División, the second division of Peruvian football (soccer), was played by 10 teams. The tournament winner, Deportivo Municipal was promoted to the 1969 Torneo Descentralizado.

== Competition format ==
All teams faced each other in a double round-robin format, playing home and away matches. The team that accumulated the highest number of points at the end of the season was automatically crowned champion and promoted to the Peruvian Primera División, while the team with the fewest points was relegated to the Ligas Provinciales de Lima y Callao.

Two points were awarded for a win, one point for a draw, and no points for a loss.

== Teams ==
=== Team changes ===
Promoted from 1967 Liguilla de Ascenso	Promoted to 1968 Primera División	Relegated from 1967 Primera División	Relegated to 1968 Liga Provincial del Callao
▲ Deportivo SIMA (1st)	▲KDT Nacional (1st)	▼ Deportivo Municipal (13th)	▼ Íntimos de la Legua (10th)

=== Stadia and locations ===
Team	City
ADO	Callao
Atlético Sicaya	Callao
Carlos Concha	Callao
Ciclista Lima	Cercado de Lima
Deportivo Municipal	Cercado de Lima
Deportivo SIMA	Callao
Independiente Sacachispas	Breña, Lima
Juventud Gloria	Jesús María, Lima
Racing San Isidro	San Isidro, Lima
Unión América	Cercado de Lima

== League table ==
=== Standings ===
Pos	Team	Pld	W	D	L	GF	GA	GD	Pts	Qualification or relegation
1	Deportivo Municipal (C)	18	13	2	3	37	12	+25	28	1969 Torneo Descentralizado
2	ADO	18	12	2	4	31	20	+11	26	
3	Carlos Concha	18	9	5	4	34	21	+13	23	
4	Deportivo SIMA	18	8	5	5	27	19	+8	21	
5	Ciclista Lima	18	9	1	8	27	28	−1	19	
6	Independiente Sacachispas	18	7	3	8	24	23	+1	17	
7	Juventud Gloria	18	5	4	9	28	36	−8	14	
8	Racing San Isidro	18	4	5	9	19	37	−18	13	
9	Atlético Sicaya	18	4	3	11	17	40	−23	11	
10	Unión América (R)	18	3	2	13	27	41	−14	8	1969 Liga Provincial de Lima

(C) Champions; (R) Relegated

== Results ==
Home \ Away	ADO	SIC	CAR	CIC	MUN	SIM	IND	JUV	RAC	UAM
ADO		—	—	—	—	—	—	—	—	—
Atlético Sicaya	—		—	—	—	—	—	—	—	—
Carlos Concha	—	—		—	—	—	—	—	—	—
Ciclista Lima	—	—	—		—	—	—	—	—	—
Deportivo Municipal	—	—	—	—		—	—	—	—	—
Deportivo SIMA	—	—	—	—	—		—	—	—	—
Independiente Sacachispas	—	—	—	—	—	—		—	—	—
Juventud Gloria	—	—	—	—	—	—	—		—	—
Racing San Isidro	—	—	—	—	—	—	—	—		—
Unión América	—	—	—	—	—	—	—	—	—	

Updated to match(es) played on 1968. Source: Diario El Comercio, La Prensa and Crónica.
Legend: Blue = home team win; Yellow = draw; Red = away team win.

== Cuadrangular de Ascenso a Segunda División ==
Atlético Barrio Frigorífico, as champions of the 1968 Liga Provincial del Callao; Centro Chupaca, as champions of the 1968 Liga Provincial del Lima; Sport Almagro Barranco, as champions of the 1968 Liga de los Balnearios del Sur; and Huracán San Isidro, as champions of the 1968 Liga Distrital de San Isidrio, were to compete in a final four (round-robin) to determine promotion to the 1969 Segunda División.

=== Standings ===
Pos	Team	Pld	W	D	L	GF	GA	GD	Pts	Qualification or relegation	HSI	CHU	BAR	ALM
1	Huracán San Isidro	0	0	0	0	0	0	0	0	1969 Segunda División		—	—	
2	Centro Chupaca	0	0	0	0	0	0	0	0					—
3	Atlético Barrio Frigorífico	0	0	0	0	0	0	0	0			—		—
4	Sport Almagro Barranco	0	0	0	0	0	0	0	0		—			

Source: Diario La Crónica 1969
Legend: Blue = home team win; Yellow = draw; Red = away team win.

=== Tiebreaker ===
Team 1	Score	Team 2
Huracán San Isidro	2–0	Centro Chupaca

Huracán San Isidro earned promotion to the 1969 Segunda División.

== See also ==
- 1968 Torneo Descentralizado
- 1968 Copa Perú
