= 1975 FBC Melgar season =

FBC Melgar
1975 season
- Stadium: Estadio Mariano Melgar
- Torneo Descentralizado: First Stage: Fourth (4°); Liguilla Final Fourth (4°); Fourth National (4°)
| Home colours | Away colours | Third colours |

The 1975 FBC Melgar season was the club's 61st season since its foundation in 1915. Six (6) participations in the top-flight of Peruvian Primera División (of 59 Editions) with denomination Torneo Descentralizado. In Previous Season the club qualified as 12th Place of the 1974 Torneo Descentralizado.

Melgar were one of eighteen (18) clubs in the Tenth edition (10.º) Torneo Descentralizado, the competition most important of the Peruvian football. The club played the Peruvian Primera División for Sixth (6th) Time.

== Torneo Descentralizado ==
=== First Stage ===
| Pos | Team | Pld | W | D | L | GF | GA | GD | Pts |
|---|---|---|---|---|---|---|---|---|---|
| 3 | Universitario | 34 | 16 | 10 | 8 | 43 | 38 | +5 | 42 |
| 4 | FBC Melgar | 34 | 12 | 14 | 8 | 48 | 39 | +9 | 38 |
| 5 | Juan Aurich | 34 | 12 | 13 | 9 | 36 | 26 | +10 | 37 |

== See also ==
- FBC Melgar
- 1975 Torneo Descentralizado
