= 1970 Torneo Descentralizado =

Torneo Descentralizado
- Season: 1970
- Dates: 20 June 1970 – 10 January 1971
- Champions: Sporting Cristal; 4th Primera División title
- Runner up: Universitario
- Relegated: Deportivo SIMA; Atlético Grau
- 1971 Copa Libertadores: Sporting Cristal; Universitario
- 1971 Copa Ganadores de Copa: Juan Aurich
- Top goalscorer: Teófilo Cubillas (22 goals)

The 1970 Torneo Descentralizado was the 54th season of the highest division of Peruvian football. Atlético Torino and Deportivo SIMA made their debut in the first division this season. The national champion was Sporting Cristal while Deportivo SIMA and Atlético Grau were relegated.

== Competition modus ==
The season was divided into two phases. In the first phase the 14 teams played each other twice playing at least one home match and one away match. The teams that finished in first to seventh place advanced to the championship group which contested the national title. The teams that finished in eighth to fourteenth place advanced to the relegation group where they determined the two teams that would be relegated from the division. Teams carried their first phase results in the second phase and played the teams in their group at least once.

The points system during the season varied. In the first leg of the first phase—the first 13 rounds—2 points were awarded for a win, 1 point for a draw and no points for a loss; in the second leg of the first phase—the last 13 rounds—and in the second stage a win was awarded 4 points, a draw was awarded 2 points and no points were awarded for a loss.

== Teams ==
=== Team changes ===
Promoted from 1969 Segunda División	Promoted from 1970 Copa Perú	Relegated from 1969 Primera División
▲ Deportivo SIMA (1st)	▲ Atlético Torino (1st)	▼ Centro Iqueño (13th) ▼KDT Nacional (14th)

=== Stadia locations ===
Locations of the 1970 Primera División teams

Team	City
Alianza Lima	La Victoria, Lima
Atlético Grau	Piura
Atlético Torino	Talara
Carlos A. Mannucci	Trujillo
Defensor Arica	Breña, Lima
Defensor Lima	Breña, Lima
Deportivo Municipal	Cercado de Lima
Deportivo SIMA	Callao
Juan Aurich	Chiclayo
Octavio Espinosa	Ica
Porvenir Miraflores	Miraflores, Lima
Sport Boys	Callao
Sporting Cristal	Rímac, Lima
Universitario	Breña, Lima

== First stage ==
=== Standings ===
Pos	Team	Pld	W	D	L	GF	GA	GD	Pts	Qualification
1	Universitario	26	16	7	3	56	22	+34	56	Liguilla Final
2	Defensor Arica	26	13	7	6	38	26	+12	53	Liguilla Final
3	Sporting Cristal	26	13	8	5	44	25	+19	49	Liguilla Final
4	Juan Aurich	26	10	10	6	34	25	+9	45	Liguilla Final
5	Deportivo Municipal	26	10	9	7	32	31	+1	44	Liguilla Final
6	Octavio Espinosa	26	6	13	7	14	13	+1	39	Liguilla Final
7	Defensor Lima	26	8	9	9	25	24	+1	37	Liguilla Final
8	Sport Boys	26	8	7	11	31	38	−7	36	Liguilla Descenso
9	Alianza Lima	26	8	8	10	44	40	+4	34	Liguilla Descenso
10	Porvenir Miraflores	26	6	10	10	32	41	−9	33	Liguilla Descenso
11	Carlos A. Mannucci	26	8	6	12	29	37	−8	32	Liguilla Descenso
12	Deportivo SIMA	26	5	11	10	21	31	−10	32	Liguilla Descenso
13	Atlético Grau	26	5	8	13	24	41	−17	28	Liguilla Descenso
14	Atlético Torino	26	7	5	14	25	52	−27	28	Liguilla Descenso

=== Results ===
Home \ Away	ALI	GRA	TOR	CAM	ARI	DEF	MUN	SIM	AUR	OCT	POR	SBA	SCR	UNI
Alianza Lima		0–2	5–1	3–1	0–1	0–3	4–0	3–0	2–2	2–0	3–2	4–0	3–3	2–2
Atlético Grau	3–1		—	—	—	—	—	—	0–1	—	—	2–4	1–1	1–2
Atlético Torino	2–2	—		—	—	—	—	—	—	—	—	0–3	0–5	0–1
Carlos A. Mannucci	0–0	—	—		—	—	—	—	—	—	—	3–1	1–0	1–1
Defensor Arica	2–0	—	—	—		—	—	—	—	—	—	2–1	0–2	0–0
Defensor Lima	3–1	—	—	—	—		—	—	0–1	—	—	1–0	0–0	1–2
Deportivo Municipal	2–2	—	—	—	—	—		—	—	—	—	2–0	1–3	0–0
Deportivo SIMA	0–0	—	—	—	—	—	—		—	—	—	2–0	1–3	2–1
Juan Aurich	3–2	—	—	—	—	—	1–0	—		—	—	0–0	1–2	0–1
Octavio Espinosa	0–2	—	—	—	—	—	—	—	0–2		—	1–0	0–0	1–1
Porvenir Miraflores	2–0	—	—	—	—	—	—	—	—	—		1–1	2–2	2–1
Sport Boys	1–1	1–1	3–0	0–2	0–4	3–1	1–3	1–1	0–0	1–1	2–1		1–0	1–3
Sporting Cristal	1–0	3–1	3–0	3–2	1–1	1–1	3–2	1–1	3–1	1–0	2–0	0–2		0–1
Universitario	4–2	4–0	9–0	6–0	1–1	1–0	3–1	1–0	2–1	1–1	4–0	2–4	2–1	

Updated to match(es) played on 1970. Source: Rsssf.org Peru 1970
Legend: Blue = home team win; Yellow = draw; Red = away team win.

== Liguilla Final ==
=== Standings ===
Pos	Team	Pld	W	D	L	GF	GA	GD	BP	Pts	Qualification	CRI	UNI	ARI	JAU	DLI	MUN	OCT
1	Sporting Cristal (C)	32	18	9	5	58	32	+26	26	71	1971 Copa Libertadores			2–1		2–1	2–0	
2	Universitario	32	19	8	5	69	30	+39	24	70	1971 Copa Libertadores	2–3				0–0		
3	Defensor Arica	32	15	9	8	43	30	+13	26	65			3–0		0–2		—	
4	Juan Aurich	32	13	10	9	44	36	+8	21	57	1971 Copa Ganadores de Copa	2–4	0–3					1–0
5	Defensor Lima	32	10	11	11	33	32	+1	18	49				—	2–4			—
6	Deportivo Municipal	32	11	9	12	37	44	−7	17	48			1–4		2–0	—		—
7	Octavio Espinosa	32	7	15	10	22	28	−6	18	47		1–1	1–4	—				

Legend: Blue = home team win; Yellow = draw; Red = away team win.
(C) Champions

== Liguilla Descenso ==
=== Standings ===
Pos	Team	Pld	W	D	L	GF	GA	GD	BP	Pts	Relegation	SBA	ALI	POR	TOR	CAM	SIM	GRA
8	Sport Boys	32	10	10	12	41	48	−7	20	50			2–1		1–1		2–2	
9	Alianza Lima	32	10	10	12	49	44	+5	16	46				0–1		0–0		2–0
10	Porvenir Miraflores	32	8	12	12	39	49	−10	17	45		4–2				—		—
11	Atlético Torino	32	10	7	15	30	55	−25	17	44			0–1				—	—
12	Carlos A. Mannucci	32	9	9	14	37	44	−7	15	42		1–1					—	—
13	Deportivo SIMA (R)	32	5	15	12	27	41	−14	15	40	1971 Segunda División		1–1			—		—
14	Atlético Grau (R)	32	7	10	15	35	51	−16	16	40	1971 Copa Perú	1–2			—		—	

Legend: Blue = home team win; Yellow = draw; Red = away team win.
(R) Relegated

== Top scorers ==
Player	Nationality	Goals	Club
Teófilo Cubillas	Peru	22	Alianza Lima

== See also ==
- 1970 Copa Presidente de la República
- 1970 Peruvian Segunda División
- 1970 Copa Perú
