= Carlos Oliva =

Carlos Oliva may refer to:

- Carlos Oliva (footballer, born 1948), Peruvian footballer
- Carlos Oliva (footballer, born 1979), Honduran pastor and former footballer

== See also ==
- Juan Carlos Oliva (born 1965), Spanish football manager
