= 1972 FBC Melgar season =

FBC Melgar
1972 season
- Stadium: Estadio Mariano Melgar
- Torneo Descentralizado: Torneo Preliminar: Fourth (4°) (Group Regional); Torneo Descentralizado League: Tenth (10°); Tenth National (10°)
Home colours	Away colours	Third colours

The 1972 FBC Melgar season were the Fifty-Eighth (58.º) of the club from its foundation in 1915, Three (3) participations in the top-flight of Peruvian Primera División (of 56 Editions) with denomination Torneo Descentralizado. In Previous Season the club qualified as 7th Place of the 1971 Torneo Descentralizado.

Melgar were one of sixteen (16) clubs in the Seventh edition (7.º) Torneo Descentralizado, the competition most important of the Peruvian football. The club played the Peruvian Primera División for Third (3rd) Time.

== Torneo Descentralizado ==
=== Torneo Preliminar ===
==== Group Regional ====
Pos	Team	Pld	W	D	L	GF	GA	GD	Pts
3	Atlético Torino	14	6	5	3	19	13	+6	17
4	FBC Melgar	14	6	3	5	23	18	+5	15
3	Juan Aurich	14	4	7	3	26	23	+3	15

== See also ==
- FBC Melgar
- 1972 Torneo Descentralizado
