= José Leyva =

Peruvian footballer (born 1952)

Personal information
- Full name: José Luis Leyva Vásquez
- Date of birth: 15 February 1952 (age 74)
- Place of birth: Chancay, Peru
- Position: Forward

Senior career*
Years	Team	Apps	(Gls)
1974–1976	Alfonso Ugarte		
1977	FBC Melgar		
1977	9 de Octubre		
1978	FBC Melgar		
1979–1980	Alfonso Ugarte		
1981	ADT		
1982–1985	Alfonso Ugarte		

International career
1981	Peru	1	(0)
- * Club domestic league appearances and goals

José Luis Leyva Vásquez (born on 15 February 1952) is a Peruvian professional footballer who played as forward.

He is considered the most outstanding player of the Alfonso Ugarte de Puno club, where he finished twice as top scorer in the Peruvian football championship in the 1970s.

== Playing career ==
=== Club career ===
José Leyva began his career at Alfonso Ugarte de Puno in 1974. He had his best individual season there in 1975 when, alongside his attacking partner Ernesto Neyra, he became Peruvian league runner-up and top scorer with 25 goals. Still with Alfonso Ugarte, he played six Copa Libertadores matches in 1976 (no goals scored) and had the opportunity to be the Peruvian league's top scorer again in 1979 (28 goals). Completely identified with this club, he finished his career there in 1985.

In addition, he also played for FBC Melgar in Arequipa from 1977 to 1978 – with a break in Ecuador, at 9 de Octubre in 1977 – and for AD Tarma in 1981.

As a Peruvian international, he played a friendly match against Czechoslovakia in Lima on February 4, 1981 (1–3 defeat).

== Honours ==
Alfonso Ugarte de Puno

- Torneo Descentralizado Top scorer (2): 1975 (25 goals), 1979 (28 goals)
