= Trigueros =

Trigueros may refer to:

- Trigueros, Huelva, Spain;
- Trigueros del Valle, Valladolid, Spain;
- Antonio Trigueros (born 1948), Peruvian footballer;
- Manu Trigueros (born 1991), Spanish footballer
