= 1972 Torneo Descentralizado =

Torneo Descentralizado
- Season: 1972
- Dates: 1 April 1972– 4 January 1973
- Champions: Sporting Cristal
- Relegated: Carlos A. Mannucci; Defensor Arica
- 1973 Copa Libertadores: Sporting Cristal; Universitario
- Top goalscorer: Francisco Gonzales (20 goals)

The 1972 Torneo Descentralizado, the top category of Peruvian football, was played by 16 teams. The season was divided into 3 stages. The first stage was contested in two groups: Metropolitan (teams from Lima and Callao) and Regional (teams from the rest of the country); each group winner qualified for the Championship Group. The second stage was the Descentralised (league tournament); the top 4 qualified for the Championship Group and the bottom 2 were relegated. Championship Group was contested by 6 teams in Lima; neither team carried their previous records. The national champion was Sporting Cristal.

== Teams ==
=== Team changes ===
Promoted from 1971 Segunda División	Promoted from 1972 Copa Perú	Relegated from 1971 Primera División
▲ Deportivo SIMA (1st)	▲ Atlético Grau (1st) ▲ León de Huánuco (2nd)	▼ADO (14th) ▼ Octavio Espinosa (15th) ▼ Porvenir Miraflores (15th)

=== Stadia locations ===
Locations of the 1972 Primera División teams

Team	City	Stadium	Capacity	Field
Alianza Lima	La Victoria, Lima	Nacional	45,750	Grass
Atlético Grau	Piura	Miguel Grau (Piura)	25,000	Grass
Atlético Torino	Talara	Campeonísimo	8,000	Grass
Carlos A. Mannucci	Trujillo	Mansiche	24,000	Grass
Defensor Arica	Breña, Lima	Nacional	45,750	Grass
Defensor Lima	Breña, Lima	Nacional	45,750	Grass
Deportivo Municipal	Cercado de Lima	Nacional	45,750	Grass
Deportivo SIMA	Callao	Miguel Grau	15,000	Grass
José Gálvez	Chimbote	Manuel Rivera Sánchez	25,000	Artificial
Juan Aurich	Chiclayo	Elías Aguirre	24,500	Grass
León de Huánuco	Huánuco	Heraclio Tapia	15,000	Grass
Melgar	Arequipa	Mariano Melgar	20,000	Grass
Sport Boys	Callao	Miguel Grau	15,000	Grass
Sporting Cristal	Rímac, Lima	Nacional	45,750	Grass
Unión Tumán	Tumán	Eugenio Zapata Mingoya	8,000	Grass
Universitario	Breña, Lima	Nacional	45,750	Grass

== Torneo Preliminar ==
=== Grupo Metropolitano ===
Pos	Team	Pld	W	D	L	GF	GA	GD	Pts	Qualification	CRI	DLI	SBA	MUN	UNI	ALI	DAR	SIM
1	Sporting Cristal	14	8	4	2	21	13	+8	20	Liguilla Final		1–1	1–2	1–1	1–1	4–3	0–1	1–0
2	Defensor Lima	14	8	3	3	28	16	+12	19		1–2		1–1	—	1–0	3–1	—	—
3	Sport Boys	14	4	7	3	28	22	+6	15		2–2	1–1		2–1	1–1	8–1	3–3	1–1
4	Deportivo Municipal	14	5	4	5	19	18	+1	14		0–1	—	3–1		1–1	1–2	—	—
5	Universitario	14	4	5	5	17	17	0	13		1–2	2–0	1–1	1–2		1–2	1–1	2–3
6	Alianza Lima	14	5	2	7	18	28	−10	12		0–2	0–2	1–3	2–0	1–2		2–0	1–0
7	Defensor Arica	14	2	6	6	16	25	−9	10		0–2	—	1–0	—	0–1	1–1		—
8	Deportivo SIMA	14	2	5	7	16	24	−8	9		0–1	—	4–2	—	1–2	1–1	—	

Legend: Blue = home team win; Yellow = draw; Red = away team win.

=== Grupo Regional ===
Pos	Team	Pld	W	D	L	GF	GA	GD	Pts	Qualification	GAL	TUM	TOR	MEL	JAU	GRA	CAM	LEÓ
1	José Gálvez	14	8	4	2	18	11	+7	20	First place play-off		—	2–0	—	1–1	0–2	—	3–0
2	Unión Tumán	14	7	6	1	23	13	+10	20	First place play-off	—		—	—	—	—	—	—
3	Atlético Torino	14	6	5	3	19	13	+6	17		—	—		—	—	—	—	—
4	Melgar	14	6	3	5	23	18	+5	15		0–0	—	—		—	—	—	—
5	Juan Aurich	14	4	7	3	26	23	+3	15		3–1	—	—	—		—	—	—
6	Atlético Grau	14	4	3	7	24	24	0	11		1–3	—	—	—	—		—	—
7	Carlos A. Mannucci	14	3	2	9	13	29	−16	8		1–2	—	—	—	—	—		—
8	León de Huánuco	14	2	2	10	12	27	−15	6		1–0	—	—	—	—	—	—	

Legend: Blue = home team win; Yellow = draw; Red = away team win.

==== First place play-off ====
3 August 1972
20:00

José Gálvez	1–0	Unión Tumán
Marcos Portilla 69'

Estadio Nacional, Lima
Attendance: 23,509
Referee: César Orozco

== Torneo Descentralizado ==
=== Standings ===
Pos	Team	Pld	W	D	L	GF	GA	GD	Pts	Qualification or relegation
1	Alianza Lima	30	17	7	6	55	26	+29	41	Liguilla Final
2	Defensor Lima	30	16	8	6	60	35	+25	40	Liguilla Final
3	Deportivo Municipal	30	16	8	6	45	30	+15	40	Liguilla Final
4	Universitario	30	12	11	7	61	34	+27	35	Liguilla Final
5	Juan Aurich	30	15	5	10	55	44	+11	35	
6	Sporting Cristal	30	11	10	9	41	34	+7	32	
7	Atlético Grau	30	11	7	12	38	47	−9	29	
8	José Gálvez	30	8	12	10	32	34	−2	28	
9	Deportivo SIMA	30	6	16	8	33	37	−4	28	
10	Melgar	30	12	3	15	38	43	−5	27	
11	Atlético Torino	30	10	7	13	35	47	−12	27	
12	Unión Tumán	30	8	10	12	40	41	−1	26	
13	Sport Boys	30	9	8	13	38	45	−7	26	
14	León de Huánuco	30	7	12	11	33	47	−14	26	
15	Carlos A. Mannucci (R)	30	7	10	13	30	53	−23	24	1973 Copa Perú
16	Defensor Arica (R)	30	4	8	18	24	61	−37	16	1973 Copa Perú

(R) Relegated

=== Results ===
Home \ Away	ALI	GRA	TOR	CAM	DAR	DEF	MUN	SIM	GAL	AUR	LEO	MEL	SBA	CRI	TUM	UNI
Alianza Lima		3–0	3–0	4–1	2–0	0–1	1–1	2–2	1–0	1–2	5–1	2–1	1–0	2–0	3–2	2–2
Atlético Grau	1–2		—	—	—	—	—	—	—	—	—	—	1–2	2–1	—	1–4
Atlético Torino	1–0	—		—	—	—	—	—	—	—	—	—	3–2	1–1	—	1–2
Carlos A. Mannucci	1–1	—	—		—	—	—	—	—	—	—	—	0–0	0–4	—	3–2
Defensor Arica	0–5	—	—	—		—	—	—	—	—	—	—	1–4	1–1	—	0–2
Defensor Lima	1–1	—	—	—	—		—	—	—	—	—	—	2–1	1–1	—	0–0
Deportivo Municipal	1–0	—	—	—	—	—		—	—	—	—	—	2–0	0–2	—	0–2
Deportivo SIMA	0–3	—	—	—	—	—	—		—	—	—	—	1–1	1–1	—	2–1
José Gálvez	1–1	—	—	—	—	—	—	—		—	—	—	1–2	1–1	—	3–1
Juan Aurich	3–1	—	—	—	—	—	—	—	—		—	—	4–2	1–2	—	1–1
León de Huánuco	0–2	—	—	—	—	—	—	—	—	—		—	0–1	2–2	—	0–2
Melgar	0–1	—	—	—	—	—	—	—	—	—	—		1–1	1–0	—	1–0
Sport Boys	1–3	0–2	3–1	2–0	2–3	0–0	0–1	2–2	2–2	1–2	1–0	0–2		1–0	4–4	1–1
Sporting Cristal	0–1	1–3	2–0	0–1	1–1	3–1	0–0	1–0	4–1	1–2	1–1	5–4	1–0		1–4	2–0
Unión Tumán	1–0	—	—	—	—	—	—	—	—	—	—	—	0–2	0–1		4–2
Universitario	2–2	6–0	7–0	2–1	5–1	1–0	2–3	1–1	0–0	1–1	0–0	5–1	4–0	1–1	2–2	

Updated to match(es) played on unknown. Source:
Legend: Blue = home team win; Yellow = draw; Red = away team win.

== Liguilla Final ==
=== Standings ===
Pos	Team	Pld	W	D	L	GF	GA	GD	Pts	Qualification	CRI	UNI	MUN	GAL	ALI	DLI
1	Sporting Cristal (C)	5	3	2	0	6	3	+3	8	1973 Copa Libertadores			2–1			1–1
2	Universitario	5	2	3	0	10	7	+3	7	1973 Copa Libertadores	1–1				3–1	
3	Deportivo Municipal	5	1	3	1	8	7	+1	5			2–2		1–1		2–0
4	José Gálvez	5	0	4	1	5	6	−1	4		0–1	2–2				1–1
5	Alianza Lima	5	0	3	2	4	7	−3	3		0–1		2–2	1–1		
6	Defensor Lima	5	0	3	2	3	6	−3	3			1–2			0–0	

Legend: Blue = home team win; Yellow = draw; Red = away team win.
(C) Champions

== Top scorers ==
Player	Nationality	Goals	Club
Francisco Gonzales	Peru	20	Defensor Lima
Vinha de Souza	Brazil	20	Sporting Cristal
Walter Sossa	Uruguay	18	Sport Boys
Manuel Mellán	Peru	16	Deportivo Municipal
Juan Rivero Arias	Peru	15	Alianza Lima
Oswaldo Ramírez	Peru	15	Universitario
Fernando Bastida	Argentina	15	Melgar
Teófilo Cubillas	Peru	14	Alianza Lima
Hugo Sotil	Peru	14	Deportivo Municipal
Enrique Casaretto	Peru	13	Defensor Lima
Andrés Zegarra	Peru	12	Juan Aurich
Percy Rojas	Peru	11	Universitario
Víctor Zegarra	Peru	11	Alianza Lima
José del Castillo	Peru	11	Sporting Cristal
Miguel Tojo	Argentina	11	Defensor Lima
Héctor Bailetti	Peru	10	Universitario
Omar Pietrone	Argentina	10	Deportivo Municipal

== Awards ==
Award	Winner
Best Team	(Peru) Sporting Cristal
Golden Boot	(Peru) Teófilo Cubillas (Alianza Lima)
Manager of the year	(Peru) Marcos Calderón (Sporting Cristal)
Goalkeeper of the year	(Peru) Carlos Salinas (Alianza Lima)
Foreign player of the year	(Brazil) Vinha de Souza (Sporting Cristal)
Young player of the year	(Peru) Juan Carlos Oblitas (Universitario)
Veteran player of the year	(Peru) Víctor Zegarra (Alianza Lima)
Breakout player	(Peru) Francisco Gonzales (Defensor Lima)
Disappointing player	(Argentina) Miguel Ángel Converti Jr. (Defensor Lima)

== See also ==
- 1972 Peruvian Segunda División
- 1972 Copa Perú
- 1972 Hexagonal de Ascenso
