= 1969 Sporting Cristal season =

Sporting Cristal
1969 season
- Stadium: San Martín de Porres, Lima
- Torneo Descentralizado: Torneo Apertura: Fourth (4°); First Stage: Twelfth (12°); Liguilla Descenso: Third (3°); Nineth National (9°)
Home colours	Away colours	Third colours

The 1969 Sporting Cristal season was the fourteenth season of the club since its foundation in 1955, their fourteenth consecutive participation in the top flight of Peruvian Primera División with Torneo Descentralizado. In the previous season the club qualified as National Champions, coming in first place in the 1968 Torneo Descentralizado.

Sporting Cristal were one of fourteen clubs in the 1969 Torneo Descentralizado, the most important competition of Peruvian football. The club played in the Peruvian Primera División and Copa Libertadores for the third time.

== Torneo Descentralizado ==
=== Torneo Apertura (unofficial) ===
Pos	Team	Pld	W	D	L	GF	GA	GD	Pts
3	Juan Aurich	13	6	6	1	23	16	+7	18
4	Sporting Cristal	13	7	1	5	19	16	+3	15
5	Deportivo Municipal	13	7	1	5	23	20	+3	15

== See also ==
- Club Sporting Cristal
- 1969 Torneo Descentralizado
