= 1971 Peruvian Segunda División =

Peruvian Segunda División
- Season: 1971
- Champions: Deportivo SIMA
- Relegated: Estudiantes San Roberto

The 1971 Peruvian Segunda División, the second division of Peruvian football (soccer), was played by 10 teams. The tournament winner, Deportivo SIMA was promoted to the 1972 Torneo Descentralizado.

== Competition format ==
All teams faced each other in a double round-robin format, playing home and away matches. The team that accumulated the highest number of points at the end of the season was automatically crowned champion and promoted to the Peruvian Primera División, while the team with the fewest points was relegated to the Ligas Provinciales de Lima y Callao.

Two points were awarded for a win, one point for a draw, and no points for a loss.

== Teams ==
=== Team changes ===
Promoted from 1970 Liguilla de Ascenso	Promoted to 1971 Primera División	Relegated from 1970 Primera División	Relegated to 1971 Liga Distrital de San Isidro	Relegated to 1971 Liga Provincial de Lima
▲ Atlético Chalaco (1st)	▲ADO (1st)	▼ Deportivo SIMA (13th)	▼ Huracán San Isidro (10th)	▼KDT Nacional (11th)

=== Stadia and locations ===
Team	City
Atlético Chalaco	Callao
Atlético Sicaya	Callao
Carlos Concha	Callao
Centro Iqueño	Cercado de Lima
Ciclista Lima	Cercado de Lima
Deportivo SIMA	Callao
Estudiantes San Roberto	Cercado de Lima
Independiente Sacachispas	Breña, Lima
Mariscal Sucre	La Victoria, Lima
Racing San Isidro	San Isidro, Lima

== League table ==
=== Standings ===
Pos	Team	Pld	W	D	L	GF	GA	GD	Pts	Qualification or relegation
1	Deportivo SIMA	0	0	0	0	0	0	0	0	1972 Primera División
2	Atlético Chalaco	0	0	0	0	0	0	0	0	
3	Centro Iqueño	0	0	0	0	0	0	0	0	
4	Mariscal Sucre	0	0	0	0	0	0	0	0	
5	Carlos Concha	0	0	0	0	0	0	0	0	
6	Ciclista Lima	0	0	0	0	0	0	0	0	
7	Independiente Sacachispas	0	0	0	0	0	0	0	0	
8	Racing San Isidro	0	0	0	0	0	0	0	0	
9	Atlético Sicaya	0	0	0	0	0	0	0	0	
10	Estudiantes San Roberto	0	0	0	0	0	0	0	0	1972 Liga Provincial de Lima

== Results ==
Home \ Away	CHA	SIC	CAR	CEN	CIC	SIM	EST	IND	SUC	RAC
Atlético Chalaco		—	—	—	—	—	—	—	—	—
Atlético Sicaya	—		—	—	—	—	—	—	—	—
Carlos Concha	—	—		—	—	—	—	—	—	—
Centro Iqueño	—	—	—		—	—	—	—	—	—
Ciclista Lima	—	—	—	—		—	—	—	—	—
Deportivo SIMA	—	—	—	—	—		—	—	—	—
Estudiantes San Roberto	—	—	—	—	—	—		—	—	—
Independiente Sacachispas	—	—	—	—	—	—	—		—	—
Mariscal Sucre	—	—	—	—	—	—	—	—		—
Racing San Isidro	—	—	—	—	—	—	—	—	—	

Updated to match(es) played on 1971. Source: Diario El Comercio, La Prensa and Crónica.
Legend: Blue = home team win; Yellow = draw; Red = away team win.

== See also ==
- 1971 Torneo Descentralizado
- 1971 Copa Perú
