= Carlos Oliva (footballer, born 1948) =

Peruvian footballer (born 1948)

Personal information
- Full name: Carlos Oliva Sosa
- Date of birth: 2 February 1948 (age 78)
- Place of birth: Breña (Lima), Peru
- Position: Midfielder

Senior career*
Years	Team	Apps	(Gls)
1964–1969	Defensor Lima		
1970–1971	Defensor Arica		
1972	Deportivo SIMA		
1973	Deportivo Municipal		
1974	Barrio Frigorífico		
1975–1978	Defensor Lima		
1979–1980	Deportivo Junín		

International career
1970	Peru	1	(0)
- * Club domestic league appearances and goals

Carlos Oliva Sosa (born 2 February 1948) is a Peruvian professional footballer who played as midfielder.

== Playing career ==
=== Club career ===
Nicknamed Puchito Oliva, he is one of the emblematic figures of Defensor Lima, where he first played between 1964 and 1969, and then again from 1975 to 1978. Playing alongside Carlos Urrunaga and Juan José Ávalos in attack at the latter club, this famous trio was dubbed Los Carasucias de Breña (The Dirty faces of Breña) by the Peruvian press.

He also played for Defensor Arica, with whom he made four appearances in the Copa Libertadores in 1970. After a stint with Deportivo Municipal, he finished his career at Deportivo Junín in 1980, where he served as player-manager in 1979.

=== International career ===
Carlos Oliva played a friendly match for Peru against Bulgaria on 21 February 1970, as part of preparations for the 1970 World Cup (a 1–3 defeat). However, he was not selected for the squad that participated in the World Cup.
