= 1976 Torneo Descentralizado =

Torneo Descentralizado
- Season: 1976
- Dates: 30 May 1976 – 5 January 1977
- Champions: Unión Huaral
- Relegated: Carlos A. Mannucci
- Copa Libertadores: Unión Huaral; Sport Boys
- Top goalscorer: Alejandro Luces (17 goals)

The 1976 Torneo Descentralizado, the top category of Peruvian football, was played by 16 teams. The national champion was Unión Huaral.

== Teams ==
=== Team changes ===
Relegated from
1975 Primera División
▼ Unión Tumán (15th)
▼ Atlético Grau (18th)

=== Stadia locations ===
Locations of the 1976 Primera División teams

Team	City	Stadium	Capacity	Field
Alfonso Ugarte	Puno	Enrique Torres Belón	20,000	Grass
Alianza Lima	La Victoria, Lima	Alejandro Villanueva	35,000	Grass
Atlético Chalaco	Callao	Miguel Grau	15,000	Grass
Carlos A. Mannucci	Trujillo	Mansiche	24,000	Grass
Cienciano	Cusco	Garcilaso	40,000	Grass
CNI	Iquitos	Max Augustín	24,000	Grass
Defensor Lima	Breña, Lima	Nacional	45,750	Grass
Deportivo Junín	Huancayo	Huancayo	20,000	Grass
Deportivo Municipal	Cercado de Lima	Nacional	45,750	Grass
Juan Aurich	Chiclayo	Elías Aguirre	24,500	Grass
León de Huánuco	Huánuco	Heraclio Tapia	15,000	Grass
Melgar	Arequipa	Mariano Melgar	20,000	Grass
Sport Boys	Callao	Miguel Grau	15,000	Grass
Sporting Cristal	Rímac, Lima	Nacional	45,750	Grass
Unión Huaral	Huaral	Julio Lores Colan	10,000	Grass
Universitario	Breña, Lima	Nacional	45,750	Grass

== League table ==
=== Standings ===
Pos	Team	Pld	W	D	L	GF	GA	GD	Pts	Qualification or relegation
1	Unión Huaral (C, O)	30	15	9	6	44	25	+19	39	Title play-off
2	Sport Boys	30	13	13	4	47	32	+15	39	Title play-off
3	Juan Aurich	30	13	12	5	41	29	+12	38	
4	Universitario	30	13	10	7	41	33	+8	36	
5	Alianza Lima	30	11	12	7	51	32	+19	34	
6	León de Huánuco	30	11	11	8	37	29	+8	33	
7	Sporting Cristal	30	9	12	9	28	26	+2	30	
8	Deportivo Junín	30	10	9	11	39	38	+1	29	
9	CNI	30	10	9	11	30	34	−4	29	
10	Melgar	30	10	9	11	45	52	−7	29	
11	Alfonso Ugarte	30	10	6	14	46	43	+3	26	
12	Cienciano	30	7	12	11	36	37	−1	26	
13	Atlético Chalaco	30	7	12	11	38	52	−14	26	
14	Defensor Lima	30	8	10	12	39	57	−18	26	
15	Deportivo Municipal	30	5	13	12	34	46	−12	23	
16	Carlos A. Mannucci (R)	30	7	3	20	34	65	−31	17	1977 Copa Perú

(C) Champions; (O) Play-off winners; (R) Relegated

== Results ==
Home \ Away	UGA	ALI	CHA	CAM	CIE	CNI	DEF	JUN	MUN	AUR	LEO	MEL	SBA	CRI	HUA	UNI
Alfonso Ugarte		1–1	–	–	3–2	–	–	–	–	–	–	–	1–3	3–1	1–0	1–0
Alianza Lima	2–0		4–0	6–0	3–1	3–4	2–0	2–1	2–2	2–2	3–2	1–1	1–1	0–0	2–2	1–1
Atlético Chalaco	–	0–4		–	–	–	–	–	–	–	–	–	1–4	0–0	–	1–1
Carlos A. Mannucci	–	2–1	–		–	–	–	–	1–1	–	–	–	0–1	1–0	1–2	1–1
Cienciano	–	0–0	–	–		–	–	–	–	–	–	1–1	0–2	2–0	–	1–1
CNI	–	0–2	–	–	–		–	–	–	–	–	–	0–0	0–1	1–0	1–0
Defensor Lima	–	0–4	–	–	–	–		–	–	–	–	–	2–2	1–1	–	1–1
Deportivo Junín	–	0–0	–	–	–	–	–		–	–	2–2	–	1–1	0–0	–	1–2
Deportivo Municipal	–	1–1	–	–	–	–	0–0	–		–	–	–	1–1	2–1	–	0–1
Juan Aurich	–	0–2	–	–	–	–	–	–	–		–	5–0	0–0	0–0	0–0	2–1
León de Huánuco	–	0–0	–	–	–	–	–	–	–	–		–	1–0	1–0	–	0–0
Melgar	–	2–0	–	–	0–0	–	–	–	–	–	–		0–0	1–1	1–4	4–1
Sport Boys	3–0	3–1	2–2	2–1	4–3	3–4	3–1	2–1	2–2	0–1	0–0	2–2		2–1	0–0	1–0
Sporting Cristal	2–0	3–0	2–0	2–2	2–0	1–1	0–1	3–0	1–1	1–1	1–0	2–1	0–3		1–0	0–0
Unión Huaral	2–1	2–1	1–1	3–2	2–0	0–0	2–1	2–0	1–1	–	3–0	5–1	0–0	2–0		1–1
Universitario	2–1	1–0	2–1	2–1	3–1	1–2	1–1	1–0	4–2	1–2	2–1	4–1	3–2	1–1	2–1	

Updated to match(es) played on unknown. Source:
Legend: Blue = home team win; Yellow = draw; Red = away team win.

== Title play-off ==
5 January 1977
20:00

Unión Huaral	2–0	Sport Boys
Mario Gutiérrez 68'; Walter Escobar 80'

Estadio Nacional, Lima
Attendance: 43,672
Referee: César Orozco

== Top scorers ==
Player	Nationality	Goals	Club
Alejandro Luces	Peru	16	Unión Huaral
