= Pedro Ruíz (footballer, born 1947) =

Peruvian footballer (born 1947)

Pedro Ruiz
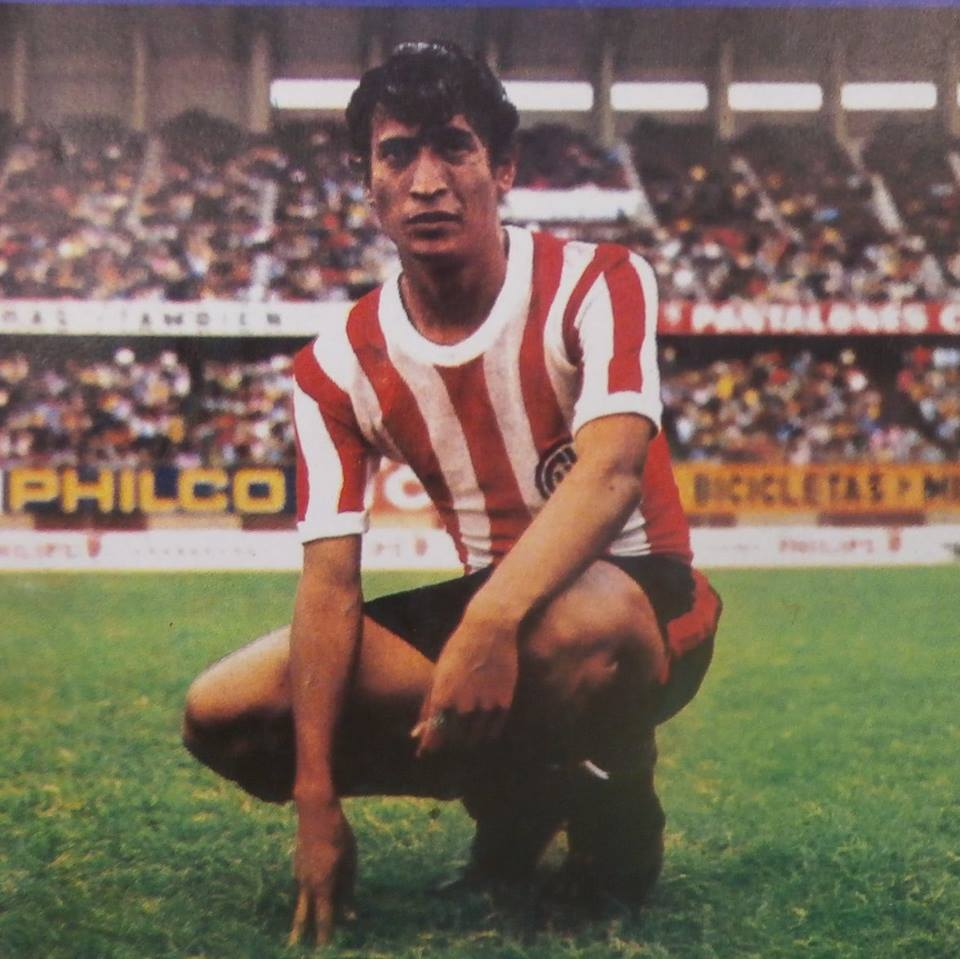
- Ruíz playing for Unión Huaral

Personal information
- Full name: Pedro Domingo Ruiz La Rosa
- Date of birth: 6 July 1947 (age 79)
- Place of birth: Huaral, Peru
- Position: Midfielder

Senior career*
Years	Team	Apps	(Gls)
1966	Oscar Berckemeyer		
1967–1971	Defensor Lima		
1972	Juan Aurich		
1973	Defensor Lima		
1974–1982	Unión Huaral		
1983–1984	Sporting Cristal		
1985–1988	Unión Huaral		

International career
1975–1979	Peru	7	(0)

Managerial career
- 1986: Unión Huaral
- 2002–2003: Unión Huaral
- 2016: Unión Huaral
Medal record
Men's football
Representing Peru
Copa América
Winner	1975
- * Club domestic league appearances and goals

Pedro Domingo Ruiz La Rosa (born 6 July 1947) is a Peruvian footballer.

Playing as a midfielder, he is considered the greatest player of his hometown club, Unión Huaral. He was also part of Peru's squad for the 1975 Copa América tournament.

== Club career ==
"Pedrito" Ruiz left an indelible mark on Peruvian football in the 1970s and 80s, becoming a beloved figure among both the public and the sports press. He began his career with the Oscar Berckemeyer club in Huaral in 1966, but it was with another club in his hometown that he truly made his name: Unión Huaral. He led them to second place in the Peruvian championship in 1974 before winning the title two years later—a historic victory, as it was the first ever won by a club outside the Lima-Callao metropolitan area.

He had, however, been a Peruvian champion in 1973 with another club, Defensor Lima. He would win the title a third time, ten years later, with Sporting Cristal, thanks in particular to his partnership with fellow Huaral native Jorge Hirano. Returning to Unión Huaral in 1985, he had a brief stint as a player-manager in 1986 before hanging up his boots in 1988.

A cerebral midfielder with exceptional passing accuracy and a set-piece specialist, Pedro Ruiz's career was nonetheless hampered by his penchant for nightlife and his fear of flying, which prevented him from playing abroad in a more competitive league, unlike other Peruvian stars of the era such as Teófilo Cubillas, Hugo Sotil, or César Cueto.

== International career ==
Despite his great talent, he played only a few matches with the Peruvian national team (7 in total, between 1975 and 1979, with no goals scored). He did, however, play three matches in the 1975 Copa América, which Peru won.

== Managerial career ==
Pedro Ruiz was appointed coach of his lifelong club, Unión Huaral, in 2002 when the club was in the second division. After a blistering end to the season where Unión Huaral won their last nine matches, the club was crowned D2 champion and returned to the top flight in 2003.

== Honours ==
=== Player ===
Defensor Lima

- Peruvian Primera División: 1973

Unión Huaral

- Peruvian Primera División: 1976

Sporting Cristal

- Peruvian Primera División: 1983

=== Manager ===
Unión Huaral

- Segunda División: 2002
