= 1974 Liga Provincial de Lima (Interligas) =

Liga Provincial de Lima
- Season: 1974
- Dates: January 1975 – August 1975
- Champions: Compañía Peruana de Teléfonos

The 1974 Liga Provincial de Lima (Interligas de Lima), the fourth division of Peruvian football (soccer), was contested by various clubs from the districts of Lima, specifically the top three teams from the 1974 district leagues of Metropolitan Lima.

Due to scheduling reasons, and because the 1974 district leagues concluded at the end of that year while the Interligas tournament was played between January and August 1975, this first edition is officially considered part of the 1974 season.

This was the first tournament officially known as the Interligas de Lima, successor to the Hexagonal de Ascenso of 1972 and the Octogonal de Ascenso of 1973 championships.

The tournament winner, Compañía Peruana de Teléfonos was promoted to the 1975 Copa Perú.

== Liguilla Final ==
=== Standings ===
Pos	Team	Pld	W	D	L	GF	GA	GD	Pts	Promotion
1	Compañia Peruana de Teléfonos (C)	10	6	2	2	18	7	+11	14	1975 Copa Perú - National stage
2	Papelera Atlas	10	5	4	1	13	8	+5	14	1975 Copa Perú - National stage
3	CITSA	10	6	2	2	15	11	+4	14	
4	Deportivo Helvético	9	3	2	4	6	8	−2	8	
5	Universidad Federico Villareal	10	2	2	6	14	18	−4	6	
6	Bata Sol	9	1	2	6	7	21	−14	4	

(C) Champions

=== Results ===
Teams play each other once, either home or away. The matches were played only in Lima.

Home \ Away	BSC	DCI	CPT	DHE	PAT	UVM
Bata Sol		1–5	0–4	2–1	1–3	1–3
CITSA	2–1		0–3	1–0	0–0	3–1
Compañía Peruana de Teléfonos	0–0	2–0		0–1	2–1	2–1
Deportivo Helvético	—	1–0	0–2		1–2	1–0
Papelera Atlas	0–0	1–1	2–1	0–0		2–1
Universidad Federico Villareal	3–1	1–3	2–2	1–1	1–2	

Updated to match(es) played on 1975. Source: Diario El Comercio, La Prensa and Crónica.
Legend: Blue = home team win; Yellow = draw; Red = away team win.

== See also ==
- 1975 Torneo Descentralizado
- 1975 Copa Perú
