= Alejandro Luces =

Peruvian footballer (born 1950)

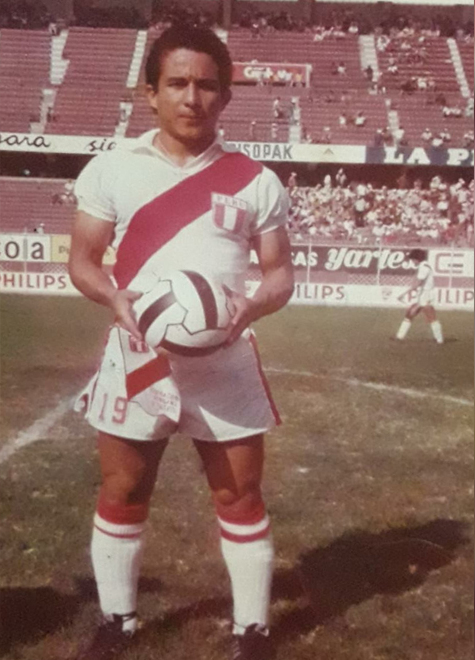
- Luces with Peru in 1977

Personal information
- Full name: Alejandro Luces Salinas
- Date of birth: 20 January 1950 (age 76)
- Place of birth: Santa province, Peru
- Position: Forward

Senior career*
Years	Team	Apps	(Gls)
1969–1971	José Gálvez		
1972–1973	Unión Tumán		
1974	Juan Aurich		
1975–1977	Unión Huaral		
1978–1979	Universitario		
1980	Green Cross-Temuco	13	(3)
1981–1984	Unión Huaral		
1985	León de Huánuco		
1986	Unión Huaral		

International career
1977	Peru	8	(3)
- * Club domestic league appearances and goals

Alejandro Luces Salinas (born on 20 January 1950) is a Peruvian former professional footballer who played as forward.

== Playing career ==
=== Club career ===
Nicknamed Torito (little bull), Alejandro Luces distinguished himself during the 1976 Peruvian Championship with Unión Huaral, forming a partnership with Pedro Ruiz La Rosa that led the club to its first-ever championship title. He finished as the tournament's top scorer with 17 goals.

Although he primarily played for clubs in northern Peru—José Gálvez FBC (where he made his debut), Juan Aurich and León de Huánuco—he signed with Universitario de Deportes in 1978. In 1980, he moved to Chile to play for Green Cross (now Deportes Temuco).

With Unión Huaral and Universitario, he participated in the Copa Libertadores in 1975, 1977 and 1979. He played 14 matches and scored four goals in the competition.

=== International career ===
Peruvian international Alejandro Luces made eight appearances for the national team (scoring three goals). He played all of his matches in 1977, including three World Cup 1978 qualifiers where he scored one goal.

== Honours ==
Unión Huaral

- Torneo Descentralizado: 1976
- Torneo Descentralizado Top scorer: 1976 (17 goals)
