= 1969 Peruvian Segunda División =

Peruvian Segunda División
- Season: 1969
- Champions: Deportivo SIMA
- Relegated: Juventud Gloria

The 1969 Peruvian Segunda División, the second division of Peruvian football (soccer), was played by 10 teams. The tournament winner, Deportivo SIMA was promoted to the 1970 Torneo Descentralizado.

== Competition format ==
All teams faced each other in a double round-robin format, playing home and away matches. The team that accumulated the highest number of points at the end of the season was automatically crowned champion and promoted to the Peruvian Primera División, while the team with the fewest points was relegated to the Ligas Provinciales de Lima y Callao.

Two points were awarded for a win, one point for a draw, and no points for a loss.

== Teams ==
=== Team changes ===
Promoted from 1968 Liguilla de Ascenso	Promoted to 1969 Primera División	Relegated from 1968 Primera División	Relegated to 1969 Liga Provincial de Lima
▲ Huracán San Isidro (1st)	▲ Deportivo Municipal (1st)	▼ Mariscal Sucre (14th)	▼ Unión América (10th)

=== Stadia and locations ===
Team	City
ADO	Callao
Atlético Sicaya	Callao
Carlos Concha	Callao
Ciclista Lima	Cercado de Lima
Deportivo SIMA	Callao
Huracán San Isidro	San Isidro, Lima
Independiente Sacachispas	Breña, Lima
Juventud Gloria	Jesús María, Lima
Mariscal Sucre	La Victoria, Lima
Racing San Isidro	San Isidro, Lima

== League table ==
=== Standings ===
Pos	Team	Pld	W	D	L	GF	GA	GD	Pts	Qualification or relegation
1	Deportivo SIMA (C)	0	0	0	0	0	0	0	0	1970 Torneo Descentralizado
2	Mariscal Sucre	0	0	0	0	0	0	0	0	
3	ADO	0	0	0	0	0	0	0	0	
4	Carlos Concha	0	0	0	0	0	0	0	0	
5	Ciclista Lima	0	0	0	0	0	0	0	0	
6	Independiente Sacachispas	0	0	0	0	0	0	0	0	
7	Racing San Isidro	0	0	0	0	0	0	0	0	
8	Huracán San Isidro	0	0	0	0	0	0	0	0	
9	Atlético Sicaya (O)	0	0	0	0	0	0	0	0	Relegation play-off
10	Juventud Gloria (R)	0	0	0	0	0	0	0	0	Relegation play-off

(C) Champions; (O) Play-off winners; (R) Relegated

== Results ==
Home \ Away	ADO	SIC	CAR	CIC	SIM	HSI	IND	JUV	SUC	RAC
ADO		—	—	—	—	—	—	—	—	—
Atlético Sicaya	—		—	—	—	—	—	—	—	—
Carlos Concha	—	—		—	—	—	—	—	—	—
Ciclista Lima	—	—	—		—	—	—	—	—	—
Deportivo SIMA	—	—	—	—		—	—	—	—	—
Huracán San Isidro	—	—	—	—	—		—	—	—	—
Independiente Sacachispas	—	—	—	—	—	—		—	—	—
Juventud Gloria	—	—	—	—	—	—	—		—	—
Mariscal Sucre	—	—	—	—	—	—	—	—		—
Racing San Isidro	—	—	—	—	—	—	—	—	—	

Updated to match(es) played on 1969. Source: Diario El Comercio, La Prensa and Crónica.
Legend: Blue = home team win; Yellow = draw; Red = away team win.

== Relegation play-off ==
Atlético Sicaya	2–1	Juventud Gloria

== See also ==
- 1969 Torneo Descentralizado
- 1969 Copa Perú
