= Andrés Zegarra =

Peruvian footballer (born 1947)

Personal information
- Full name: Andrés Francisco Zegarra Malpartida
- Date of birth: 15 April 1947 (age 79)
- Place of birth: Lima, Peru
- Position: Right winger

Senior career*
Years	Team	Apps	(Gls)
1965–1970	Defensor Arica		
1971–1972	Juan Aurich		
1973–1975	Alianza Lima		
1976–1977	FBC Melgar		
1978	Deportivo Municipal		
1979–1981	CNI		
1982–1983	Coronel Bolognesi		
1984	Huancayo FC		

International career
1967–1975	Peru	11	(0)
- * Club domestic league appearances and goals

Andrés Francisco Zegarra Malpartida (born on 15 April 1947) is a Peruvian footballer who played as a right-winger. He is the cousin of Víctor Zegarra, a famous Peruvian footballer from the 1960s.

== Biography ==
=== Club career ===
Andrés Zegarra made a name for himself at Defensor Arica, where he played from 1965 to 1970. He was a Peruvian league runner-up in 1969 and played in one match of the 1970 Copa Libertadores. Between 1971 and 1972, he played for Juan Aurich of Chiclayo.

Returning to Lima, he signed with Alianza Lima in 1973, winning the Peruvian league title in 1975. Between 1976 and 1983, he played successively for FBC Melgar of Arequipa, Deportivo Municipal, CNI of Iquitos and finally Coronel Bolognesi of Tacna. He ended his career in 1984 with Huancayo FC (now Deportivo Junín).

=== International career ===
Peruvian international Andrés Zegarra earned 11 caps between 1967 and 1975. He played one match in the 1970 World Cup qualifiers against Bolivia on 17 August 1969 (3–1 victory).

== Honours ==
Alianza Lima

- Torneo Descentralizado: 1975
