= 1975 Copa Perú =

Copa Perú
- Season: 1975
- Champions: Atlético Torino
- Runner up: Sportivo Huracán
- Top goalscorer: Jorge Torres (2)

The 1975 Copa Perú season (Spanish: Copa Perú 1975), the promotion tournament of Peruvian football.

In this tournament, after many qualification rounds, each one of the 24 departments in which Peru is politically divided qualified a team. Those teams, plus the team relegated from First Division on the last year, enter in two more rounds and finally 6 of them qualify for the Final round, staged in Lima (the capital).

This year the tournament was held but no team was promoted to First Division because of a law from Peruvian government (Law # 22555). The champion was awarded with the right to represent Peru in an international tournament for amateur teams. Only 4 teams entered the Final.

A playoff was necessary as first place was tied.

== Finalists teams ==
The following list shows the teams that qualified for the Final Stage.

Department	Team	Location
Arequipa	Sportivo Huracán	Arequipa
Callao	Deportivo SIMA	Callao
Lima	Compañía Peruana de Teléfonos	Lima
Piura	Atlético Torino	Talara

== Provincial Stage ==
=== 1974−75 Liga Provincial de Lima (Interligas) ===
==== Liguilla Final ====
===== Standings =====
Pos	Team	Pld	W	D	L	GF	GA	GD	Pts	Promotion	CPT	PAT	DCI	DHE	UVM	BSC
1	Compañía Peruana de Teléfonos	10	6	2	2	18	7	+11	14	National Stage		2–1	2–0	0–1	2–1	0–0
2	Papelera Atlas	10	5	4	1	13	8	+5	14	National Stage	2–1		1–1	0–0	2–1	0–0
3	CITSA	10	6	2	2	15	11	+4	14		0–3	0–0		1–0	3–1	2–1
4	Deportivo Helvético	9	3	2	4	6	8	−2	8		0–2	1–2	1–0		1–0	—
5	Universidad Federico Villareal	10	2	2	6	14	18	−4	6		2–2	1–2	1–3	1–1		3–1
6	Bata Sol	9	1	2	6	7	21	−14	4		0–4	1–3	1–5	2–1	1–3	

Source: Diario La Crónica
Legend: Blue = home team win; Yellow = draw; Red = away team win.

=== 1975 Liga Provincial de Lima (Interligas) ===
==== Liguilla Final ====
===== Standings =====
Pos	Team	Pld	W	D	L	GF	GA	GD	Pts	Promotion	AUR	BAN	BAR
1	Aurora Miraflores	2	1	1	0	2	1	+1	3	National Stage			1–1
2	Deportivo Bancoper	2	1	0	1	8	1	+7	2		0–1		
3	Deportivo Barboncito	2	0	1	1	1	9	−8	1			0–8	

Source: Diario La Crónica
Legend: Blue = home team win; Yellow = draw; Red = away team win.

* Aurora Miraflores, Compañía Peruana de Teléfonos and Papelera Atlas qualified for the Regional Stage.

== Final Stage ==
=== Standings ===
Pos	Team	Pld	W	D	L	GF	GA	GD	Pts	Qualification
1	Atlético Torino (C)	3	2	1	0	3	1	+2	5	Champions
2	Sportivo Huracán	3	2	1	0	5	1	+4	5	
3	Compañia Peruana de Teléfonos	3	1	0	2	1	3	−2	2	
4	Deportivo SIMA	3	0	0	3	0	4	−4	0	

(C) Champions

=== Results ===
==== Round 1 ====
13 December 1975	Atlético Torino	1–0	Compañia Peruana de Teléfonos	Nacional, Lima

13 December 1975	Sportivo Huracán	2–0	Deportivo SIMA	Nacional, Lima

==== Round 2 ====
17 December 1975	Sportivo Huracán	2–0	Compañia Peruana de Teléfonos	Nacional, Lima

17 December 1975	Atlético Torino	1–0	Deportivo SIMA	Nacional, Lima

==== Round 3 ====
20 December 1975	Compañia Peruana de Teléfonos	1–0	Deportivo SIMA	Nacional, Lima

20 December 1975	Atlético Torino	1–1	Sportivo Huracán	Nacional, Lima

==== Title Play-off ====
22 December 1975	Atlético Torino	2–1	Sportivo Huracán	Nacional, Lima

== See also ==
- 1975 Torneo Descentralizado
- 1974 Liga Provincial de Lima (Interligas)
