= 1975 Torneo Descentralizado =

Torneo Descentralizado
- Season: 1975
- Dates: 11 January 1975 – 29 February 1976
- Champions: Alianza Lima
- Runner up: Alfonso Ugarte
- Relegated: Unión Tumán; Atlético Grau
- Copa Libertadores: Alianza Lima; Alfonso Ugarte
- Copa Simón Bolívar: Alianza Lima
- Top goalscorer: José Leyva (25 goals)

The 1975 season of the Torneo Descentralizado, the top category of Peruvian football, was played by 18 teams. The top six qualified to the final group stage. As the First Division was reduced to 16 teams for 1976, no team was promoted and two teams were relegated. The criteria for relegation: Grau as the last placed team; Unión Tumán as the worst team from a Department (Lambayeque) with two teams (the other was Juan Aurich). This rule didn't apply for Lima clubs. A playoff match for 2nd place (qualifying for the Copa Libertadores) was necessary. The national champions were Alianza Lima.

== Teams ==
=== Team changes ===
Relegated from
1974 Primera División
▼ Piérola (TR)
▼ Walter Ormeño (TR)
▼ Atlético Barrio Frigorífico (20th)
▼ Unión Pesquero (22nd)

=== Stadia locations ===
Locations of the 1975 Primera División teams

| Team | City | Stadium | Capacity | Field |
|---|---|---|---|---|
| Alfonso Ugarte | Puno | Enrique Torres Belón | 20,000 | Grass |
| Alianza Lima | La Victoria, Lima | Alejandro Villanueva | 35,000 | Grass |
| Atlético Chalaco | Callao | Miguel Grau | 15,000 | Grass |
| Atlético Grau | Piura | Miguel Grau (Piura) | 25,000 | Grass |
| Carlos A. Mannucci | Trujillo | Mansiche | 24,000 | Grass |
| Cienciano | Cusco | Garcilaso | 40,000 | Grass |
| CNI | Iquitos | Max Augustín | 24,000 | Grass |
| Defensor Lima | Breña, Lima | Nacional | 45,750 | Grass |
| Deportivo Junín | Huancayo | Huancayo | 20,000 | Grass |
| Deportivo Municipal | Cercado de Lima | Nacional | 45,750 | Grass |
| Juan Aurich | Chiclayo | Elías Aguirre | 24,500 | Grass |
| León de Huánuco | Huánuco | Heraclio Tapia | 15,000 | Grass |
| Melgar | Arequipa | Mariano Melgar | 20,000 | Grass |
| Sport Boys | Callao | Miguel Grau | 15,000 | Grass |
| Sporting Cristal | Rímac, Lima | Nacional | 45,750 | Grass |
| Unión Huaral | Huaral | Julio Lores Colan | 10,000 | Grass |
| Unión Tumán | Tumán | Eugenio Zapata Mingoya | 8,000 | Grass |
| Universitario | Breña, Lima | Nacional | 45,750 | Grass |

== First Stage ==
=== Standings ===
| Pos | Team | Pld | W | D | L | GF | GA | GD | Pts | Qualification or relegation |
|---|---|---|---|---|---|---|---|---|---|---|
| 1 | Alianza Lima | 34 | 19 | 12 | 3 | 62 | 25 | +37 | 50 | Liguilla Final |
| 2 | Alfonso Ugarte | 34 | 19 | 7 | 8 | 65 | 39 | +26 | 45 | Liguilla Final |
| 3 | Universitario | 34 | 16 | 10 | 8 | 43 | 38 | +5 | 42 | Liguilla Final |
| 4 | Melgar | 34 | 12 | 14 | 8 | 48 | 39 | +9 | 38 | Liguilla Final |
| 5 | Juan Aurich | 34 | 12 | 13 | 9 | 36 | 26 | +10 | 37 | Liguilla Final |
| 6 | Deportivo Junín | 34 | 15 | 7 | 12 | 57 | 52 | +5 | 37 | Liguilla Final |
| 7 | Atlético Chalaco | 34 | 13 | 9 | 12 | 50 | 39 | +11 | 35 | |
| 8 | Sporting Cristal | 34 | 12 | 11 | 11 | 35 | 35 | 0 | 35 | |
| 9 | Carlos A. Mannucci | 34 | 12 | 10 | 12 | 40 | 44 | −4 | 34 | |
| 10 | Sport Boys | 34 | 9 | 14 | 11 | 20 | 24 | −4 | 32 | |
| 11 | Deportivo Municipal | 34 | 9 | 13 | 12 | 41 | 45 | −4 | 31 | |
| 12 | Unión Huaral | 34 | 10 | 11 | 13 | 42 | 48 | −6 | 31 | |
| 13 | CNI | 34 | 11 | 9 | 14 | 40 | 50 | −10 | 31 | |
| 14 | Defensor Lima | 34 | 8 | 13 | 13 | 37 | 51 | −14 | 29 | |
| 15 | Unión Tumán (R) | 34 | 9 | 10 | 15 | 41 | 41 | 0 | 28 | 1976 Copa Perú |
| 16 | Cienciano | 34 | 10 | 8 | 16 | 44 | 53 | −9 | 28 | |
| 17 | León de Huánuco | 34 | 6 | 15 | 13 | 30 | 55 | −25 | 27 | |
| 18 | Atlético Grau (R) | 34 | 8 | 6 | 20 | 31 | 58 | −27 | 22 | 1976 Copa Perú |

(R) Relegated

=== Results ===
| Home \ Away | UGA | ALI | CHA | GRA | CAM | CIE | CNI | DEF | JUN | MUN | AUR | LEO | MEL | SBA | CRI | HUA | TUM | UNI |
|---|---|---|---|---|---|---|---|---|---|---|---|---|---|---|---|---|---|---|
| Alfonso Ugarte | | 0–0 | 2–0 | 2–0 | 5–0 | 3–1 | 2–0 | 4–1 | 4–2 | 1–0 | 3–0 | 5–0 | 0–0 | 2–0 | 3–0 | 2–0 | 2–2 | 3–0 |
| Alianza Lima | 2–0 | | 1–1 | 4–1 | 1–1 | 7–0 | 6–0 | 4–1 | 1–1 | 2–0 | 0–0 | 1–0 | 4–1 | 0–0 | 2–2 | 0–3 | 3–2 | 2–1 |
| Atlético Chalaco | 2–3 | 0–1 | | 4–0 | 5–1 | 3–0 | 1–2 | 3–1 | 4–0 | 1–1 | 0–0 | 4–2 | 2–1 | 0–0 | 1–0 | 0–0 | 3–0 | 3–0 |
| Atlético Grau | 0–1 | 1–4 | 1–1 | | 1–0 | 1–0 | 2–1 | 1–1 | 3–0 | 0–0 | 0–0 | 0–0 | 1–1 | 0–1 | 1–0 | 2–2 | 0–2 | 0–3 |
| Carlos A. Mannucci | 3–2 | 0–0 | 0–1 | 1–1 | | 3–2 | 3–1 | 1–2 | 0–0 | 2–0 | 2–1 | 1–1 | 1–0 | 0–1 | 0–1 | 4–1 | 2–0 | 1–1 |
| Cienciano | 7–1 | 0–1 | 3–0 | 3–0 | 0–0 | | 3–0 | 1–1 | 1–1 | 2–0 | 1–0 | 2–2 | 1–2 | 1–0 | 0–1 | 3–1 | 0–1 | 1–1 |
| CNI | 1–1 | 0–2 | 1–1 | 1–2 | 1–1 | 5–1 | | 0–0 | 1–1 | 1–0 | 1–1 | 1–0 | 2–1 | 2–1 | 2–0 | 2–1 | 4–0 | 1–1 |
| Defensor Lima | 2–3 | 1–3 | 1–3 | 2–3 | 0–0 | 0–3 | 2–0 | | 1–0 | 0–1 | 3–2 | 0–0 | 0–2 | 1–1 | 0–3 | 1–1 | 2–0 | 1–1 |
| Deportivo Junín | 2–1 | 1–0 | 1–1 | 4–2 | 2–1 | 2–1 | 4–1 | 1–2 | | 5–1 | 2–1 | 3–1 | 1–1 | 3–1 | 0–0 | 5–1 | 2–0 | 1–2 |
| Deportivo Municipal | 2–2 | 2–3 | 3–1 | 4–1 | 0–1 | 2–2 | 1–1 | 4–0 | 4–1 | | 0–4 | 5–1 | 1–1 | 1–0 | 2–1 | 0–1 | 0–0 | 1–1 |
| Juan Aurich | 2–0 | 2–1 | 0–0 | 1–0 | 0–1 | 4–0 | 1–0 | 0–0 | 0–1 | 3–0 | | 1–1 | 1–0 | 0–2 | 1–0 | 2–2 | 0–0 | 0–0 |
| León de Huánuco | 1–1 | 0–0 | 1–0 | 3–2 | 2–1 | 3–1 | 1–3 | 1–6 | 0–2 | 0–0 | 0–0 | | 0–2 | 0–2 | 1–1 | 0–0 | 0–0 | 0–1 |
| Melgar | 2–0 | 1–1 | 3–2 | 2–0 | 4–2 | 2–2 | 2–2 | 1–1 | 2–0 | 1–1 | 3–1 | 2–2 | | 1–0 | 0–1 | 1–1 | 4–1 | 1–1 |
| Sport Boys | 1–1 | 0–1 | 1–0 | 1–0 | 1–2 | 0–1 | 0–1 | 0–0 | 0–1 | 1–1 | 0–0 | 1–1 | 1–1 | | 1–1 | 0–0 | 1–1 | 0–0 |
| Sporting Cristal | 2–1 | 1–1 | 0–2 | 2–0 | 1–2 | 1–1 | 3–1 | 0–3 | 3–2 | 1–1 | 2–1 | 2–2 | 0–0 | 0–1 | | 0–0 | 1–0 | 2–0 |
| Unión Huaral | 2–0 | 1–2 | 4–1 | 2–0 | 2–0 | 2–0 | 2–1 | 3–0 | 2–6 | 1–1 | 0–0 | 1–2 | 1–1 | 0–1 | 1–2 | | 3–2 | 0–2 |
| Unión Tumán | 2–4 | 1–1 | 1–0 | 4–2 | 1–1 | 2–0 | 2–0 | 0–0 | 5–2 | 2–1 | 0–1 | 2–1 | 5–0 | 0–0 | 0–0 | 2–0 | | 1–2 |
| Universitario | 0–1 | 0–1 | 4–0 | 1–3 | 3–2 | 1–0 | 1–0 | 1–1 | 4–0 | 1–1 | 1–6 | 2–1 | 0–2 | 1–0 | 2–1 | 3–1 | 1–0 | |

Updated to match(es) played on 1975. Source: https://www.rsssf.org/tablesp/peru75.html
Legend: Blue = home team win; Yellow = draw; Red = away team win.

== Liguilla Final ==
=== Standings ===
| Pos | Team | Pld | W | D | L | GF | GA | GD | Pts | Qualification | ALI | UGA | UNI | MEL | AUR | JUN |
|---|---|---|---|---|---|---|---|---|---|---|---|---|---|---|---|---|
| 1 | Alianza Lima (C) | 39 | 22 | 13 | 4 | 69 | 28 | +41 | 57 | 1976 Copa Libertadores and 1976 Copa Simón Bolívar | | 3–1 | 0–0 | | | 2–0 |
| 2 | Alfonso Ugarte (O) | 39 | 22 | 7 | 10 | 75 | 46 | +29 | 51 | Second place play-off | | | 0–2 | | 3–1 | 2–1 |
| 3 | Universitario | 39 | 20 | 11 | 8 | 51 | 41 | +10 | 51 | Second place play-off | | | | 2–1 | 2–1 | 2–1 |
| 4 | Melgar | 39 | 14 | 14 | 11 | 55 | 45 | +10 | 42 | | 0–1 | 0–4 | | | | |
| 5 | Juan Aurich | 39 | 17 | 12 | 10 | 41 | 35 | +6 | 46 | | 2–1 | | | 0–3 | | |
| 6 | Deportivo Junín | 39 | 15 | 7 | 17 | 60 | 62 | −2 | 37 | | | | | 1–3 | 0–1 | |

Source: https://www.rsssf.org/tablesp/peru75.html
Legend: Blue = home team win; Yellow = draw; Red = away team win.
(C) Champions; (O) Play-off winners

=== Second place play-off ===
29 February 1976
16:00

| Alfonso Ugarte | 0–0 | Universitario |
Penalties
| Jesús Arias (penalty scored); Walter Daga (penalty scored); Néstor Vargas (penalty scored); Ernesto Neyra (penalty scored); José Leiva (penalty scored) | 5–4 | Enrique Rojas (penalty scored); César Peralta (penalty missed); Rubén Diaz (penalty scored); Hugo Palomino (penalty scored); Carlos Chirinos (penalty scored) |

Estadio Nacional, Lima
Attendance: 38,679
Referee: Enrique Labo

== Top scorers ==
| Player | Nationality | Goals | Club |
|---|---|---|---|
| José Leyva | Peru | 25 | Alfonso Ugarte |
| Ángel Avilés | Peru | 19 | Deportivo Junín |
| Juan Rivero Arias | Peru | 17 | Alianza Lima |
| Gerónimo Barbadillo | Peru | 16 | Defensor Lima |
| Juan José Oré | Peru | 16 | Universitario de Deportes |
| Manuel Lobatón | Peru | 14 | Atlético Chalaco |
| Ernesto Neyra | Peru | 14 | Alfonso Ugarte |
| Juan del Águila | Peru | 13 | CNI de Iquitos |
| Víctor Calatayud | Peru | 13 | Juan Aurich |
| Reynaldo Jaime | Peru | 13 | Sporting Cristal |
| Miguel Ángel Canziani | Argentina | 12 | Melgar |
| Jorge Bolívar | Peru | 12 | Juan Aurich |
| Attilio Escate | Peru | 11 | Atlético Grau |
| Juan Tardío | Peru | 11 | Cienciano |
| Pedro Ruiz | Peru | 11 | Unión Huaral |
| Freddy Ravello | Peru | 10 | Deportivo Municipal |
| Félix Suárez | Peru | 10 | Atlético Chalaco |
| Jorge Jaramillo | Peru | 10 | Carlos A. Mannucci |

== Awards ==
| Award | Winner |
|---|---|
| Best Team | Alianza Lima |
| Golden Boot | César Cueto (Alianza Lima) |
| Manager of the year | Marcos Calderón (Alianza Lima) |
| Goalkeeper of the year | José González Ganoza (Alianza Lima) |
| Foreign player of the year | Rubén Techera (Universitario de Deportes) |
| Young player of the year | Gerónimo Barbadillo (Defensor Lima) |
| Veteran player of the year | Julio Meléndez (Juan Aurich) |
| Breakout player | José Leyva (Alfonso Ugarte) |

== See also ==
- 1975 Copa Perú
- 1974 Liga Provincial de Lima (Interligas)
