= 1973 Torneo Descentralizado =

Torneo Descentralizado
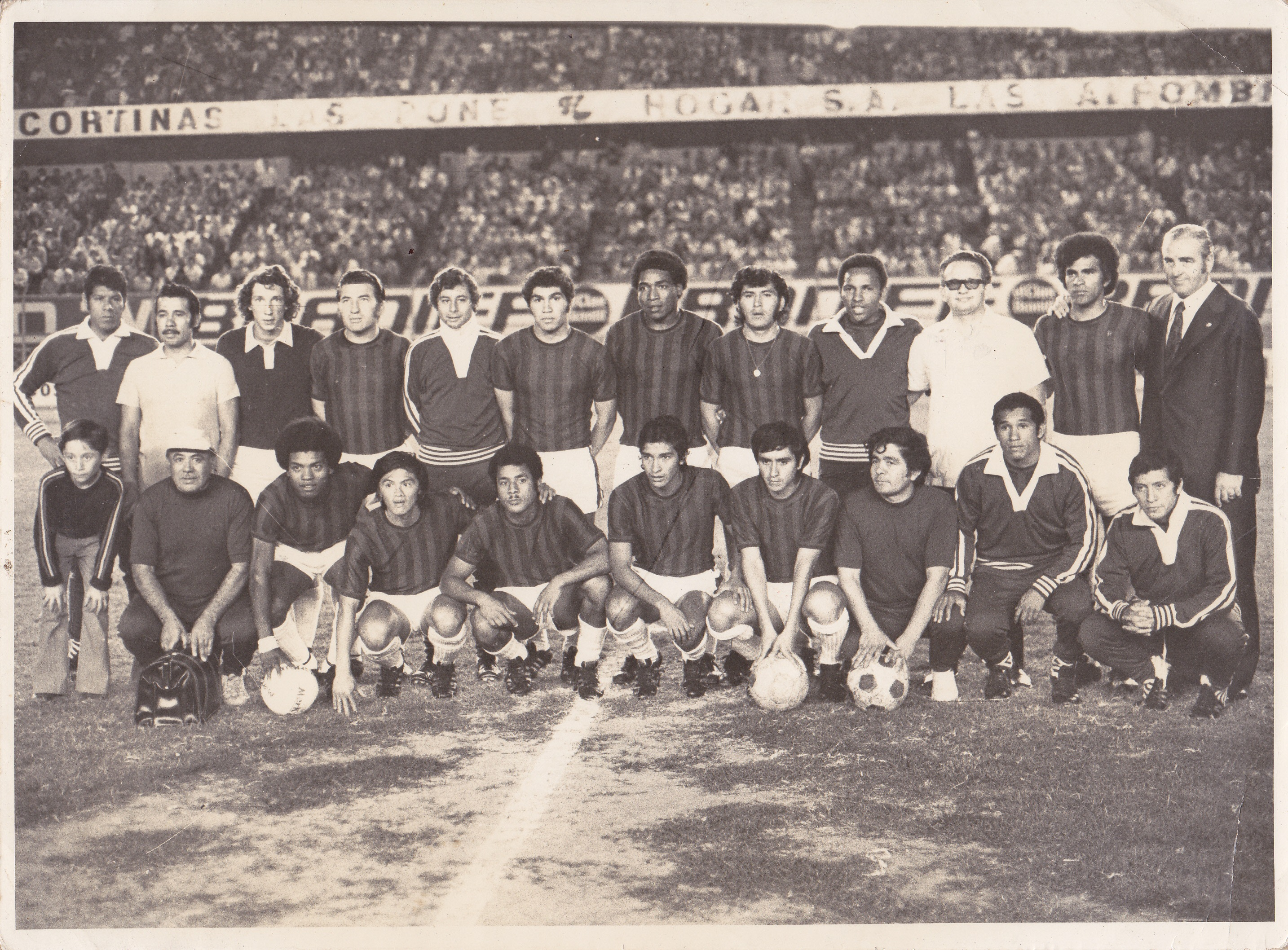
- Winning squad
- Season: 1973
- Dates: 15 April 1973 – 13 January 1974
- Champions: Defensor Lima; 1st title
- Relegated: Sportivo Huracán; Atlético Torino; José Gálvez; Deportivo SIMA
- Copa Libertadores: Defensor Lima; Sporting Cristal
- Copa Simón Bolívar: Defensor Lima
- Top goalscorer: Francisco Gonzales (25 goals)

The 1973 Torneo Descentralizado was the 57th season of the Peruvian Primera División and the ninth season of the Torneo Descentralizado. It was won for the first time by Defensor Lima. Sportivo Huracán, Atlético Torino, José Gálvez, and Deportivo SIMA were relegated.

== Competition modus ==
Eighteen teams competed against each other at home and away for a total of 34 rounds. At the end of the 34th round, four teams were relegated and the top six teams in the league table played an additional 5 rounds against each other at a neutral venue which was the Estadio Nacional. Once these 5 rounds concluded, the champions and runners-up qualified to the 1974 Copa Libertadores.

== Teams ==
=== Team changes ===
Promoted from 1972 Segunda División	Promoted from 1973 Copa Perú	Relegated from 1972 Primera División
▲ Atlético Chalaco (1st)	▲ Sportivo Huracán (1st) ▲ Cienciano (2nd) ▲CNI (Invited)	▼ Carlos A. Mannucci (15th) ▼ Defensor Arica (15th)

=== Stadia locations ===
Locations of the 1973 Primera División teams

Team	City	Stadium	Capacity	Field
Alianza Lima	La Victoria, Lima	Nacional	45,750	Grass
Atlético Chalaco	Callao	Miguel Grau	15,000	Grass
Atlético Grau	Piura	Miguel Grau (Piura)	25,000	Grass
Atlético Torino	Talara	Campeonísimo	8,000	Grass
Cienciano	Cusco	Garcilaso	40,000	Grass
CNI	Iquitos	Max Augustín	24,000	Grass
Defensor Lima	Breña, Lima	Nacional	45,750	Grass
Deportivo Municipal	Cercado de Lima	Nacional	45,750	Grass
Deportivo SIMA	Callao	Miguel Grau	15,000	Grass
José Gálvez	Chimbote	Manuel Rivera Sánchez	25,000	Grass
Juan Aurich	Chiclayo	Elías Aguirre	24,500	Grass
León de Huánuco	Huánuco	Heraclio Tapia	15,000	Grass
Melgar	Arequipa	Mariano Melgar	20,000	Grass
Sport Boys	Callao	Miguel Grau	15,000	Grass
Sporting Cristal	Rímac, Lima	Nacional	45,750	Grass
Sportivo Huracán	Arequipa	Mariano Melgar	20,000	Grass
Unión Tumán	Tumán	Eugenio Zapata Mingoya	8,000	Grass
Universitario	Breña, Lima	Nacional	45,750	Grass

== First stage ==
=== Standings ===
Pos	Team	Pld	W	D	L	GF	GA	GD	Pts	Qualification or relegation
1	Sporting Cristal	34	18	9	7	49	28	+21	45	Liguilla Final
2	Universitario	34	17	10	7	58	34	+24	44	Liguilla Final
3	Melgar	34	17	9	8	53	25	+28	43	Liguilla Final
4	Defensor Lima	34	13	16	5	46	28	+18	42	Liguilla Final
5	Deportivo Municipal	34	15	12	7	49	34	+15	42	Liguilla Final
6	Alianza Lima	34	15	11	8	55	32	+23	41	Liguilla Final
7	Atlético Chalaco	34	13	12	9	47	43	+4	38	
8	Sportivo Huracán	34	13	8	13	40	49	−9	34	Qualification for 1974 Reclasificatorio Regional
9	Cienciano	34	11	11	12	40	42	−2	33	Qualification for 1974 Reclasificatorio Regional
10	Unión Tumán	34	8	16	10	37	38	−1	32	Qualification for 1974 Reclasificatorio Regional
11	Atlético Grau	34	8	14	12	37	36	+1	30	Qualification for 1974 Reclasificatorio Regional
12	León de Huánuco	34	9	12	13	36	54	−18	30	Qualification for 1974 Reclasificatorio Regional
13	Sport Boys	34	11	6	17	47	56	−9	28	Qualification for 1974 Reclasificatorio Regional
14	Juan Aurich	34	7	14	13	38	53	−15	28	Qualification for 1974 Reclasificatorio Regional
15	CNI	34	8	10	16	39	56	−17	26	Qualification for 1974 Reclasificatorio Regional
16	Atlético Torino	34	8	10	16	35	57	−22	26	Qualification for 1974 Reclasificatorio Regional
17	José Gálvez (R)	34	7	11	16	37	56	−19	25	Relegation to the Copa Perú
18	Deportivo SIMA (R)	34	7	11	16	24	46	−22	25	Relegation to the Copa Perú

Source: RSSSF
(R) Relegated

=== Results ===
Home \ Away	ALI	CHA	GRA	TOR	CIE	CNI	DEF	MUN	SIM	GAL	AUR	LEO	MEL	SBA	CRI	HUR	TUM	UNI
Alianza Lima		3–1	4–0	2–2	0–1	1–0	1–1	0–0	2–1	3–0	2–2	3–0	3–0	2–3	2–1	7–0	2–2	2–3
Atlético Chalaco	0–0		—	—	—	—	—	—	—	—	—	—	—	1–3	0–1	—	—	3–0
Atlético Grau	2–1	—		—	—	—	—	—	—	—	—	—	—	6–0	2–0	—	—	0–0
Atlético Torino	0–1	—	—		—	—	—	—	—	—	—	—	—	2–3	1–0	—	—	1–1
Cienciano	0–0	—	—	—		—	—	—	—	—	—	—	0–0	4–3	0–0	—	—	0–1
CNI	1–3	—	—	—	—		—	—	—	—	—	—	—	2–1	0–1	—	—	1–1
Defensor Lima	2–1	—	—	—	—	—		—	—	—	—	—	—	2–2	0–1	—	—	0–3
Deportivo Municipal	1–0	—	—	—	—	—	—		—	—	—	—	—	1–1	1–0	—	—	2–0
Deportivo SIMA	2–2	—	—	—	—	—	—	—		—	—	—	—	0–4	0–1	—	—	0–2
José Gálvez	0–0	—	—	—	—	—	—	—	—		—	—	—	2–1	0–1	—	—	1–3
Juan Aurich	0–1	—	—	—	—	—	—	—	—	—		—	—	0–3	0–3	—	—	1–1
León de Huánuco	1–1	—	—	—	—	—	—	—	—	—	—		—	1–0	2–2	—	—	1–3
Melgar	2–0	—	—	—	3–1	—	—	—	—	—	—	—		4–1	2–2	—	—	3–0
Sport Boys	1–2	0–0	1–0	4–1	0–3	1–2	0–1	3–1	1–2	2–1	2–0	1–2	0–2		0–1	2–1	0–0	0–2
Sporting Cristal	1–0	2–0	2–0	2–1	7–1	0–3	1–1	2–1	0–1	2–0	1–1	2–1	3–0	2–2		3–1	1–2	1–1
Sportivo Huracán	2–1	—	—	—	—	—	—	—	—	—	—	—	—	2–1	1–1		—	3–1
Unión Tumán	0–1	—	—	—	—	—	—	—	—	—	—	—	—	1–1	0–0	—		1–1
Universitario	1–2	3–0	2–0	1–1	2–0	6–1	0–0	1–1	1–0	4–3	2–1	6–0	0–2	3–0	1–2	1–0	1–1	

Updated to match(es) played on unknown. Source:
Legend: Blue = home team win; Yellow = draw; Red = away team win.

== Liguilla Final ==
=== Standings ===
Pos	Team	Pld	W	D	L	GF	GA	GD	Pts	Qualification	DLI	CRI	UNI	ALI	MUN	MEL
1	Defensor Lima (C)	39	17	17	5	54	30	+24	51	1974 Copa Libertadores and 1974 Copa Simón Bolívar			2–1	3–0		
2	Sporting Cristal	39	20	10	9	55	33	+22	50	1974 Copa Libertadores	0–1		1–1	2–0		
3	Universitario	39	19	11	9	67	40	+27	49					1–2		4–0
4	Alianza Lima	39	18	11	10	61	39	+22	47						2–1	2–0
5	Deportivo Municipal	39	17	12	10	54	40	+14	46		0–1	1–0	1–2			
6	Melgar	39	17	10	12	57	37	+20	44	Qualification for 1974 Reclasificatorio Regional	1–1	2–3			1–2	

Legend: Blue = home team win; Yellow = draw; Red = away team win.
(C) Champions

== Top scorers ==
Player	Nationality	Goals	Club
Francisco Gonzales	Peru	25	Defensor Lima
Marcos Portilla	Peru	24	José Gálvez
Jorge Ramírez	Peru	23	Sport Boys
Vinha de Souza	Brazil	20	Sporting Cristal
Héctor Bailetti	Peru	17	Universitario
Juan Rivero Arias	Peru	16	Alianza Lima
Eladio Reyes	Peru	15	Deportivo Municipal
Pedro Alexis González	Argentina	14	Defensor Lima
Oswaldo Ramírez	Peru	14	Universitario
Pablo Muchotrigo	Peru	14	Cienciano
Francisco Montero	Peru	13	Atlético Torino
Enrique Casaretto	Peru	13	Atlético Chalaco
Oscar Pianetti	Argentina	12	Unión Tumán
Mario Núñez	Peru	12	Sportivo Huracán
Antonio Gómez	Argentina	12	FBC Melgar
David Arévalo	Peru	12	León de Huánuco
Dagoberto Lavalle	Peru	12	Sport Boys

== Awards ==
Award	Winner
Best Team	Defensor Lima
Golden Boot	Vinha de Souza (Sporting Cristal)
Manager of the year	Roque Gastón Máspoli (Defensor Lima)
Goalkeeper of the year	Ramón Quiroga (Sporting Cristal)
Foreign player of the year	Vinha de Souza (Sporting Cristal)
Young player of the year	César Cueto (Deportivo Municipal)
Veteran player of the year	Pedro Pablo León (Alianza Lima)
Breakout player	Marcos Portilla (José Gálvez)
Disappointing player	(Argentina) Ángel Clemente Rojas (Deportivo Municipal)

== See also ==
- 1973 Copa Perú
- 1973 Octogonal de Ascenso
