= Luis Fernando Bastida =

Argentine footballer

Personal information
- Date of birth: 8 July 1948 (age 78)
- Place of birth: Rawson, Argentina
- Position: Forward

Senior career*
Years	Team	Apps	(Gls)
- Boca Juniors
1969-1971	The Strongest		
1972-1973	FBC Melgar	70	(36)
1974	Unión Tumán	15	(2)
1975	Olimpia		
1976-1977	Bolívar		
1978	The Strongest		

International career
1977	Bolivia	4	(0)
- * Club domestic league appearances and goals

Luis Fernando Bastida (born 8 July 1948) was an Argentine professional footballer who played for Boca Juniors, The Strongest, FBC Melgar, Unión Tumán, Club Olimpia and Club Bolívar.

He is considered one of the best foreign reinforcements in Bolivian soccer. He is an idol of The Strongest, where he scored historic goals against Bolivar, a shirt that he also wore for a long time.
