= Antonio Trigueros =

Peruvian footballer (born 1948)

Personal information
- Date of birth: 17 January 1948 (age 78)
- Place of birth: Chilca, Peru
- Position: Left back

Youth career
- Defensor Lima

Senior career*
Years	Team	Apps	(Gls)
1970–1975	Defensor Lima		
1975–1978	Universitario		
1978–1979	Deportivo Municipal		

International career
1972–1976	Peru	14	(0)
- * Club domestic league appearances and goals

Antonio Trigueros (born 17 January 1948) is a Peruvian professional footballer who played as an left-back.

== Playing career ==
=== Club career ===
Left-back Antonio Trigueros, who came up through the ranks at Defensor Lima, won the Peruvian championship with that team in 1973. The following year, he played 10 matches in the 1974 Copa Libertadores.

In 1975, he signed with Universitario de Deportes and played one match in the 1975 Copa Libertadores. He finished his career at Deportivo Municipal in 1979.

=== International career ===
Peruvian international Antonio Trigueros played 14 times for the national team between 1972 and 1976. He only played friendly matches during this period.

== Honours ==
Defensor Lima

- Torneo Descentralizadol: 1973
