= 1973 Copa Perú =

Copa Perú
- Season: 1973
- Champions: Sportivo Huracán
- Top goalscorer: José Valenza (4)

The 1973 Copa Perú season (Spanish: Copa Perú 1973), the promotion tournament of Peruvian football.

In this tournament, after many qualification rounds, each one of the 24 departments in which Peru is politically divided qualified a team. Those teams, plus the team relegated from First Division on the last year, enter in two more rounds and finally 6 of them qualify for the Final round, staged in Lima (the capital).

Three teams were promoted to play in 1973 First Division. Although finishing in last place, CNI was promoted as the Peruvian government issued a decree stating that the oriental zone of the country (from where |CNI came) should have a team in First Division.

== Finalists teams ==
The following list shows the teams that qualified for the Final Stage.

Department	Team	Location
Ancash	Sider Perú	Ancash
Arequipa	Sportivo Huracán	Arequipa
Cusco	Cienciano	Cusco
Ica	Octavio Espinosa	Ica
Lambayeque	Deportivo Pucalá	Chiclayo
Loreto	CNI	Iquitos
Puno	Alfonso Ugarte	Puno

== Final Stage ==
=== Standings ===
Pos	Team	Pld	W	D	L	GF	GA	GD	Pts	Promotion
1	Sportivo Huracán (C)	5	4	0	1	7	2	+5	8	1973 Primera División
2	Cienciano	5	3	1	1	7	4	+3	7	1973 Primera División
3	Deportivo Pucalá	5	2	2	1	8	4	+4	6	
4	Octavio Espinosa	5	1	1	3	4	6	−2	3	
5	Sider Perú	5	1	1	3	4	8	−4	3	
6	CNI	5	1	1	3	6	12	−6	3	1973 Primera División

(C) Champions

=== Results ===
==== Round 1 ====
3 February 1973	CNI	2–1	Cienciano	Nacional, Lima

3 February 1973	Deportivo Pucalá	1–1	Sider Perú	Nacional, Lima

3 February 1973	Sportivo Huracán	1–0	Octavio Espinosa	Nacional, Lima

==== Round 2 ====
6 February 1973	Sider Perú	1–0	CNI	Nacional, Lima

6 February 1973	Cienciano	1–0	Octavio Espinosa	Nacional, Lima

6 February 1973	Sportivo Huracán	1–0	Deportivo Pucalá	Nacional, Lima

==== Round 3 ====
9 February 1973	Deportivo Pucalá	1–0	Octavio Espinosa	Nacional, Lima

9 February 1973	Cienciano	3–1	Sider Perú	Nacional, Lima

9 February 1973	Sportivo Huracán	3–1	CNI	Nacional, Lima

==== Round 4 ====
11 February 1973	Deportivo Pucalá	5–1	CNI	Nacional, Lima

11 February 1973	Octavio Espinosa	2–1	Sider Perú	Nacional, Lima

11 February 1973	Cienciano	1–0	Sportivo Huracán	Nacional, Lima

==== Round 5 ====
15 February 1973	Octavio Espinosa	2–2	CNI	Nacional, Lima

15 February 1973	Cienciano	1–1	Deportivo Pucalá	Nacional, Lima

15 February 1973	Sportivo Huracán	2–0	Sider Perú	Nacional, Lima
