= Miguel Tojo =

Argentine footballer

Personal information
- Full name: Miguel Ángel Tojo
- Date of birth: 9 July 1943 (age 83)
- Position: Forward

Senior career*
Years	Team	Apps	(Gls)
- Ferro Carril Oeste
- * Club domestic league appearances and goals

Miguel Ángel Tojo (born 9 July 1943) is an Argentine former footballer who competed in the 1964 Summer Olympics.
