= 1969 Torneo Descentralizado =

Torneo Descentralizado
- Season: 1969
- Dates: 17 May 1969 – 6 January 1970
- Champions: Universitario; 13th Primera División title
- Runner up: Defensor Arica
- Relegated: KDT Nacional
- 1970 Copa Libertadores: Universitario; Defensor Arica
- 1970 Copa Ganadores de Copa: Deportivo Municipal
- Top goalscorer: Jaime Mosquera (15 goals)

The 1969 Torneo Descentralizado was the 53rd season of the highest division of Peruvian football. Despite being relegated at the end of the 1968 season, Carlos A. Mannucci returned to the first division through the 1969 Copa Perú.

The format of the season changed from the previous season. The season was divided into two phases. In the first phase, the fourteen teams played each other once. In the second phase, the teams were divided into two groups. Teams in first to sixth place were grouped into a championship group while teams in seventh to fourteenth place were grouped into a relegation group. All teams carried their records from the first phase into the second phase.

Universitario was crowned champion. Centro Iqueño and KDT Nacional were relegated.

== Teams ==
=== Team changes ===
Promoted from 1968 Segunda División	Promoted from 1969 Copa Perú	Relegated from 1968 Primera División
▲ Deportivo Municipal (1st)	▲ Carlos A. Mannucci (1st)	▼ Carlos A. Mannucci (9th) ▼ Mariscal Sucre (14th)

=== Stadia locations ===
Locations of the 1969 Primera División teams

Team	City
Alianza Lima	La Victoria, Lima
Atlético Grau	Piura
Carlos A. Mannucci	Trujillo
Centro Iqueño	Cercado de Lima
Defensor Arica	Breña, Lima
Defensor Lima	Breña, Lima
Deportivo Municipal	Cercado de Lima
Juan Aurich	Chiclayo
KDT Nacional	Callao
Porvenir Miraflores	Miraflores, Lima
Octavio Espinosa	Ica
Sport Boys	Callao
Sporting Cristal	Rímac, Lima
Universitario	Breña, Lima

== Torneo Apertura ==
=== Standings ===
Pos	Team	Pld	W	D	L	GF	GA	GD	Pts	Qualification
1	Atlético Grau	13	10	1	2	25	13	+12	21	Liguilla Final
2	Universitario	13	8	3	2	25	15	+10	19	
3	Juan Aurich	13	6	6	1	23	16	+7	18	
4	Sporting Cristal	13	7	1	5	19	16	+3	15	
5	Deportivo Municipal	13	7	1	5	23	20	+3	15	
6	Defensor Arica	13	5	4	4	22	16	+6	14	
7	Porvenir Miraflores	13	5	3	5	20	22	−2	13	
8	Carlos A. Mannucci	13	4	5	4	24	27	−3	13	
9	Octavio Espinosa	13	4	2	7	17	22	−5	10	
10	Defensor Lima	13	4	2	7	16	23	−7	10	
11	Alianza Lima	13	4	2	7	17	25	−8	10	
12	Sport Boys	13	4	1	8	25	26	−1	9	
13	KDT Nacional	13	3	3	7	14	19	−5	9	
14	Centro Iqueño	13	2	2	9	11	21	−10	6	

Source: Rsssf.org Peru 1969

=== Results ===
Home \ Away	ALI	GRA	CAM	CEN	ARI	DEF	MUN	AUR	KDT	OCT	POR	SBA	SCR	UNI
Alianza Lima		0–2			1–3	0–2				4–2	2–3	3–1	1–0	
Atlético Grau				3–1		1–0				1–0	3–1	1–2		3–1
Carlos A. Mannucci	1–1	0–1			1–1		2–2	1–4	3–2				1–0	
Centro Iqueño	3–4		1–2		0–3					0–2		0–0	0–1	
Defensor Arica		2–3				0–1	3–1	2–2	2–2				1–2	
Defensor Lima			3–1	1–2						2–2		0–5		
Deportivo Municipal	2–0	1–0		1–0		4–0			3–1	3–0	1–3	2–1	1–3	2–5
Juan Aurich	1–1	3–3		1–3		2–1	2–0			1–0		1–0		
KDT Nacional	2–0	0–1		1–1		3–1		0–1			0–1			
Octavio Espinosa			3–3		0–2				2–0		2–1		3–0	0–2
Porvenir Miraflores			2–2	1–0	1–1	1–4		1–1				4–1	1–3	
Sport Boys			2–5		1–2				2–3	3–1			2–3	5–1
Sporting Cristal		2–3				2–1		1–1	2–0					
Universitario	3–0		5–2	1–0	1–0	0–0		3–3	0–0		2–0		1–0	

Updated to match(es) played on 1969. Source: Rsssf.org Peru 1969
Legend: Blue = home team win; Yellow = draw; Red = away team win.

== First Stage ==
=== Standings ===
Pos	Team	Pld	W	D	L	GF	GA	GD	Pts	Qualification
1	Deportivo Municipal	13	8	4	1	30	16	+14	20	Liguilla Final
2	Universitario	13	7	4	2	27	17	+10	18	Liguilla Final
3	Defensor Arica	13	6	5	2	18	8	+10	17	Liguilla Final
4	Alianza Lima	13	4	7	2	21	13	+8	15	Liguilla Final
5	Juan Aurich	13	5	4	4	20	16	+4	14	Liguilla Final
6	Atlético Grau	13	5	3	5	14	13	+1	13	Liguilla Final
7	Octavio Espinosa	13	3	7	3	13	13	0	13	Liguilla Descenso
8	Sport Boys	13	5	3	5	17	19	−2	13	Liguilla Descenso
9	Defensor Lima	13	3	7	3	17	19	−2	13	Liguilla Descenso
10	Carlos A. Mannucci	13	4	4	5	12	12	0	12	Liguilla Descenso
11	Porvenir Miraflores	13	5	2	6	21	28	−7	12	Liguilla Descenso
12	Sporting Cristal	13	3	5	5	13	17	−4	11	Liguilla Descenso
13	Centro Iqueño	13	2	4	7	12	24	−12	8	Liguilla Descenso
14	KDT Nacional	13	1	1	11	8	28	−20	3	Liguilla Descenso

Source: Rsssf.org Peru 1969

=== Results ===
Home \ Away	ALI	GRA	CAM	CEN	ARI	DEF	MUN	AUR	KDT	OCT	POR	SBA	SCR	UNI
Alianza Lima			0–0	1–1			1–1	1–1	2–0					2–2
Atlético Grau	1–3		1–0		0–1		3–2	2–1	2–0				0–0	
Carlos A. Mannucci				2–0		0–0				1–0	0–0	2–0		1–1
Centro Iqueño		1–0				0–2	1–4	1–2	1–0		2–3			1–1
Defensor Arica	2–1		3–1	4–1						1–1	2–0	1–1		0–1
Defensor Lima	0–0	1–1			1–1		1–1	2–2	1–0		4–5		3–2	2–5
Deportivo Municipal			3–2		2–1			1–0						
Juan Aurich			0–1		0–0				4–3		3–1		1–3	3–0
KDT Nacional			3–2		0–2		1–5			0–2		0–1	1–1	0–2
Octavio Espinosa	1–1	0–0		2–2		2–0	0–1	1–1				2–1		
Porvenir Miraflores	1–6	0–2					1–3		3–0	1–1				2–1
Sport Boys	2–3	2–1		2–1		0–0	3–3	0–2			2–1			
Sporting Cristal	1–0		1–0	1–1	0–0		0–2			0–0	2–3	0–3		2–3
Universitario		2–1					2–2			4–1		3–0		

Updated to match(es) played on 1969. Source: Rsssf.org Peru 1969
Legend: Blue = home team win; Yellow = draw; Red = away team win.

== Liguilla Final ==
=== Standings ===
Pos	Team	Pld	W	D	L	GF	GA	GD	Pts	Qualification	UNI	ARI	MUN	ALI	AUR	GRA
1	Universitario (C)	18	9	7	2	35	23	+12	25	1970 Copa Libertadores			2–1		1–1	1–1
2	Defensor Arica	18	7	8	3	26	15	+11	22	1970 Copa Libertadores	1–2					3–1
3	Deportivo Municipal	18	8	6	4	38	28	+10	22	1970 Copa Ganadores de Copa		2–2				2–2
4	Alianza Lima	18	6	9	3	31	20	+11	21		2–2	1–1	4–3		0–1	3–0
5	Juan Aurich	18	7	7	4	27	20	+7	21			1–1	2–0			
6	Atlético Grau	18	5	6	7	20	24	−4	16						2–2	

Source: Rsssf.org Peru 1969
Legend: Blue = home team win; Yellow = draw; Red = away team win.
(C) Champions

=== Second place play-off ===
6 January 1970

Defensor Arica	2–1	Deportivo Municipal
Andrés Zegarra; Carlos Urrunaga

Estadio Nacional, Lima

== Liguilla Descenso ==
=== Standings ===
Pos	Team	Pld	W	D	L	GF	GA	GD	Pts	Relegation	DEF	SBA	SCR	CAM	OCT	POR	CEN	KDT
7	Defensor Lima	20	8	7	5	34	32	+2	23			1–0			0–3			
8	Sport Boys	20	9	4	7	30	30	0	22				1–1	3–1				
9	Sporting Cristal	20	7	7	6	28	22	+6	21		3–0						0–0	3–0
10	Carlos A. Mannucci	20	7	6	7	24	23	+1	20		3–5		1–0				1–0	0–0
11	Octavio Espinosa	20	5	9	6	23	25	−2	19			4–2	1–2	1–4			0–0	0–0
12	Porvenir Miraflores	20	7	3	10	35	47	−12	17		1–3	2–3	2–6	2–2	4–1			
13	Centro Iqueño (R)	20	3	7	10	19	33	−14	13	1970 Segunda División	3–5	1–2				2–0		
14	KDT Nacional (R)	20	1	4	15	12	40	−28	6	1970 Segunda División	0–3	1–2				2–3	1–1	

Source: Rsssf.org Peru 1969
Legend: Blue = home team win; Yellow = draw; Red = away team win.
(R) Relegated

== Top scorers ==
Player	Nationality	Goals	Club
Jaime Mosquera	Peru	15	Deportivo Municipal

== See also ==
- 1969 Campeonato de Apertura
- 1969 Peruvian Segunda División
- 1969 Copa Perú
