= Ernesto Neyra =

Peruvian footballer and manager (born 1952)

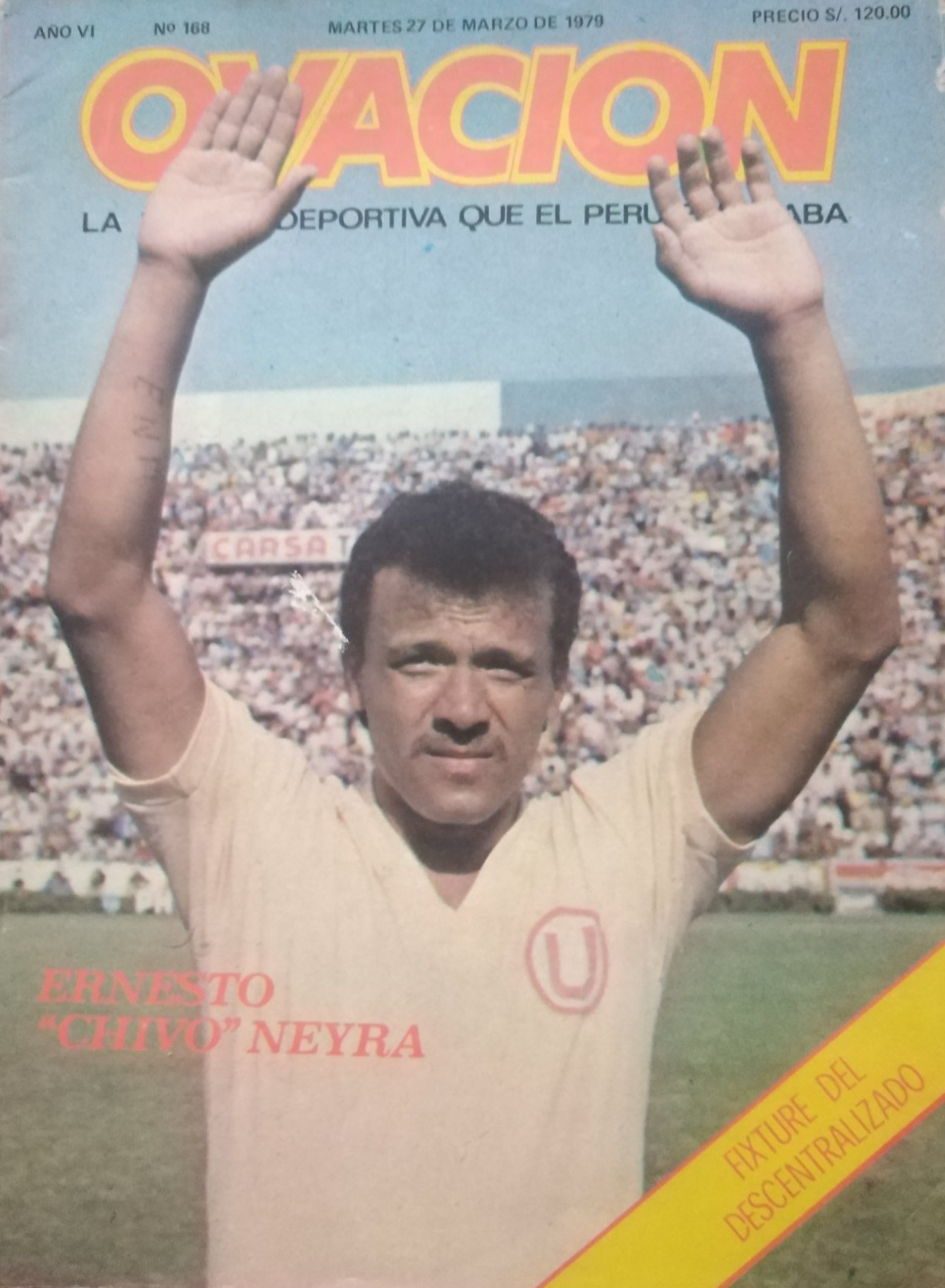
- Neyra in 1979

Personal information
- Full name: Ernesto Milagro Ricardo Neyra Llamosas
- Date of birth: 18 October 1952 (age 74)
- Place of birth: Camaná, Peru
- Position: Forward

Senior career*
Years	Team	Apps	(Gls)
1974–1978	Alfonso Ugarte (Puno)		
1979–1980	Universitario		
1981–1982	FBC Melgar		
1983	CNI		
1985	FBC Melgar		
1986	Octavio Espinosa		

International career
1976–1979	Peru	2	(0)

Managerial career
- 2005: Atlético Universidad
- 2007–?: Unión Minas (Orcopampa)
- * Club domestic league appearances and goals

Ernesto Milagro Ricardo Neyra Llamosas (born 18 October 1952) is a Peruvian football manager and former player.

Nicknamed Chivo (the goat), he is the older brother of Genaro Neyra, also a footballer in the 1980s.

== Biography ==
=== Club career ===
Like his brother Genaro, Ernesto Neyra is considered one of the idols of FBC Melgar of Arequipa, where he won the Peruvian championship in 1981. The following year, he distinguished himself in the 1982 Copa Libertadores, scoring five goals in six matches for FBC Melgar.

Previously, he had played for Alfonso Ugarte of Puno (Peruvian runners-up in 1975) between 1974 and 1978 before joining Universitario de Deportes of Lima in 1979. He played in two editions of the Copa Libertadores: in 1976 with Alfonso Ugarte (six matches, one goal) and in 1979 with Universitario (three matches, one goal).

=== International career ===
Peruvian international Ernesto Neyra received two caps for the national team. He played his first match against Uruguay on 12 October 1976 (0-0). Three years later, he played his second and last match against Ecuador on 11 July 1979 (2-1 victory).

=== Managerial career ===
Having become a coach, Neyra had the opportunity to lead Atlético Universidad in 2005. Two years later, he was found at the head of the Unión Minas of Orcopampa.

== Honours ==
=== Player ===
FBC Melgar

- Torneo Descentralizado: 1981
