= Deportivo SIMA =

- Full name: Club Deportivo SIMA (Servicios Industriales de la Marina)
- Founded: February 14, 1950
- Ground: Estadio Telmo Carbajo
- Capacity: 8,000
- League: Copa Perú
Home colours	Away colours

Deportivo SIMA is a Peruvian football club, playing in the city of Callao, Peru.

== History ==
Centro Deportivo SIMA was founded in Callao on June 1, 1961, by workers from the Servicios Industriales de la Marina. In 1967, the club won the Liga Provincial del Callao title, qualifying for the 1968 Cuadrangular de Ascenso against the champions of Lima, San Isidro, and Balnearios: Estudiantes San Roberto, Deportivo Nacional, and Huáscar Barranco, respectively. After winning the playoff, it earned promotion to the 1968 Peruvian Segunda División, where it finished in fourth place.

The club was crowned Second Division champions in 1969, securing promotion to the 1970 Torneo Descentralizado. However, in the 1970 Descentralizado, it finished second from bottom and was relegated back to the 1971 Peruvian Segunda División. With Alfonso Huapaya as head coach, the team won the 1971 Second Division title, achieving promotion to the top flight once again.

In the 1972 Torneo Descentralizado, the club finished in ninth place, while in the 1973 Torneo Descentralizado it ended bottom of the table, suffering relegation once again. As the 1972 Peruvian Segunda División was dissolved that same year, the club was forced to return to its league of origin.

The following year, it won the Liga Distrital del Callao, qualifying for the Regional Stage of the 1975 Copa Perú. After advancing through two rounds, the team managed by Jorge Chávez Fernández reached the final round-robin stage, where it ultimately finished in fourth place.

The club took part once again in the Regional Stage of the Copa Perú in 1979 and 1983, but failed to progress beyond that phase on both occasions.

In the 2006 Copa Perú, it qualified again for the Regional Stage but was eliminated by Jesús del Valle. A similar outcome followed in the 2008 Copa Perú, where it was knocked out at the same stage by Íntimo Cable Visión.

In the 2012 season, the club finished in fourth place in the Liga Distrital del Callao; however, it was invited to take part in the Liga Departamental del Callao. It was placed in Group C, where it faced Pascual Farfán and América Latina, with all three teams ending level on points.

Following the withdrawal of Pascual Farfán, qualification for the next round was decided in a playoff against América Latina, where the club suffered a 3–0 defeat and was eliminated.

During the 2013 season in the Liga Distrital del Callao, the club finished in third place but withdrew from the Liga Departamental del Callao (Interligas) due to financial constraints. As a result, it ceded its spot to Deportivo La Punta FC. Deportivo SIMA went on to finish fourth in the league in the 2015 season.

In 2016, the club did not participate in the Callao First Division, returning the following season but failing to qualify for the Interligas Chalacas. In 2019, it did not take part in the district championship and has not competed in official tournaments since.

== Statistics and results in First Division ==
=== League history ===
Season	Div.	Pos.	Pl.	W	D	L	GF	GA	P	Notes
1972	1st	9	30	6	16	8	33	37	27	9/16 Regular Season
1973	1st	18	34	7	11	16	24	46	25	18/18 Regular Season

== Honours ==
=== Senior titles ===
Keys

- Record
- ^{(s)} Shared record

Type	Competition	Titles	Runner-up	Winning years	Runner-up years
National (League)	Segunda División	2	—	1969, 1971	—
Regional (League)	Liguilla de Ascenso a Segunda División	1	—	1967	—
Regional (League)	Liga Departamental del Callao	4	4	1976, 1978, 1982, 2006	1977, 1985, 1997, 2003
Regional (League)	Primera División Amateur del Callao	2	—	1967, 1974	—
Regional (League)	Liga Distrital del Callao	6	6	1974, 1976, 1982, 1999, 2006, 2009	1985, 1987, 2000, 2001, 2008, 2010
Regional (League)	Segunda División Amateur del Callao	1	—	1966	—

== See also ==
- Copa Perú
- List of football clubs in Peru
- Peruvian football league system
