= Carlos Urrunaga =

Peruvian footballer (born 1946)

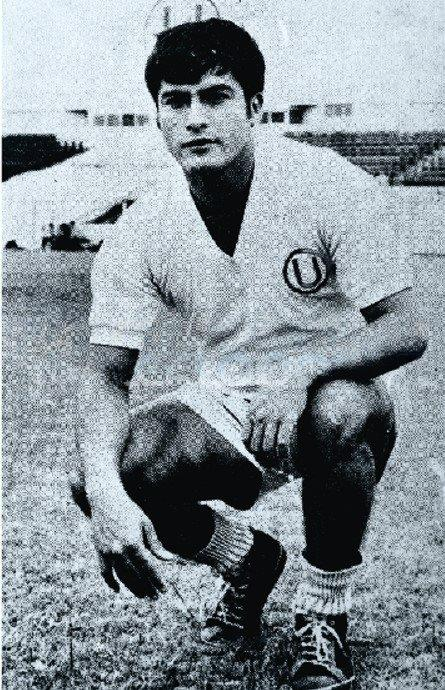
- Urrunaga in 1971

Personal information
- Full name: Carlos Alberto Urrunaga Díaz
- Date of birth: 6 July 1946 (age 80)
- Place of birth: Breña, Lima, Peru
- Height: 1.69 m (5 ft 7 in)
- Position: Forward

Youth career
- Colegio Mariano Melgar

Senior career*
Years	Team	Apps	(Gls)
1964–1968	Defensor Lima		
1969–1970	Defensor Arica		
1971	Universitario de Deportes		
1972	Juan Aurich		
1973	Unión San Felipe		
1974–1975	Deportes Concepción		
1976	Rangers de Talca		(5)
1976–1978	Rayo Vallecano		
1978	Colegio Nacional Iquitos		
1979	Deportivo Quevedo		

International career
1965–1972	Peru		
- * Club domestic league appearances and goals

Carlos Alberto Urrunaga Díaz (born 6 July 1946) is a Peruvian retired footballer. Nicknamed "Pinocho", he would notably play for Rayo Vallecano in the 1977–78 La Liga but he would also play for Defensor Lima in the 1960s, Deportes Concepción in the 1974 and 1975 Primera División de Chile. He would also represent his country internationally, playing in the 1970 FIFA World Cup qualifiers.

== Club career ==
Urrunaga would begin his career by playing for clubs based in the Brena District within his youth including the Institución Educativa Emblemática Mariano Melgar and Juventud Pilcomayo where his football talent would be demonstrated. This would result in his 1964 debut in the Peruvian Torneo Descentralizado for Defensor Lima at the young age of 18 as for the next four years, he would often play with fellow forward Ricardo López Lavalle as he would later become a notable player for the club. He was then scouted by Marcos Calderón to play for Defensor Arica where they would later go on to reach runners-up in the 1969 Torneo Descentralizado and subsequently play in the 1970 Copa Libertadores. Afterwards, he would play for Club Universitario de Deportes for the 1971 Torneo Descentralizado as well as the 1971 Copa Libertadores with his best performance being during the match against Palmeiras as he would be part of the winning squad for that year's tournament.

After playing for Juan Aurich in 1972, Urrunaga would play for his first foreign club with Unión San Felipe based in Chile and would play for other Chilean clubs such as Deportes Concepción and Rangers de Talca where he would score 5 goals throughout the 1976 Primera División de Chile. Urrunaga would then play for Rayo Vallecano beginning from the 1976–77 Segunda División until the 1977–78 La Liga. Finally, he would play his final season for Deportivo Quevedo in the 1979 Campeonato Ecuatoriano de Fútbol Serie A until his retirement that same year.

== International career ==
Urrunaga would represent Peru from 1965 to 1972, playing in the 1970 FIFA World Cup qualifiers. He would also play in a friendly against Brazil, losing 4–0.

== Personal life ==
Urrunaga currently resides in Trujillo, teaching young children at a youth football academy there. His grandson Héctor Urrunaga played for Penya Encarnada d'Andorra.
