= Defensor Lima =

- Full name: Club Atlético Defensor Lima (Lima Defender Athletic Club)
- Nicknames: Los Carasucias; Los Tigres de Breña; El Defensor; Los ágiles de Breña; Los Palomillas de Breña; Los Carasucias de Breña; El defensor
- Founded: July 31, 1931; 95 years ago
- Ground: Estadio Nacional del Perú; Lima, Perú
- President: Stefany Beltran
- Manager: Carlos Suarez
- League: Liga Distrital de Cercado de Lima
Home colours	Away colours

Club Atlético Defensor Lima is a Perúvian football club located in the district of Breña, Lima. The club was founded on July 31, 1931.

== History ==
=== Foundation (1931) ===
The club, popularly known as Los Carasucias de Breña, was founded on July 31, 1931. The origin of its name dates back to the international tour carried out in June 1929 by the Uruguayan club Defensor, known as the “Pacific tour,” which inspired the founders and led to the initial name Club Atlético Defensor Chacra Colorada, marking the beginning of the institution’s history.

The club later adopted the name Club Deportivo Defensor Breña. Under the presidency of Rómulo Martínez Aparcana, with Luz Martínez serving as its first secretary, the team competed in several local leagues in Lima. During the process of affiliating with the Peruvian Football Federation, Delia Vargas —then secretary of the federation— suggested renaming the club Club Atlético Defensor Lima in order to give it greater institutional prominence.

=== Early achievements (1937) ===
By 1936, the team had already gained recognition in the Chacra Colorada area, playing its matches at a field known as “La Cocina,” located next to La Salle School on Avenida Arica. In 1937, Defensor Lima won the Third Division of the Lima League undefeated, marking its first major sporting achievement. As an anecdote, goalkeeper Augusto Beltrán Urbina was rewarded with free haircuts at the “Defensor Lima” barbershop, at a time when the district of Breña had not yet been officially established (it would be created in 1949).

=== 1951 Championship ===
In 1951, Defensor Lima won the Primera División Amateur de Lima; however, it did not gain promotion to the Second Division due to a decision by the Peruvian Football Federation, which established that between 1951 and 1953 promotion and relegation would only occur between the First and Second Divisions.

During this period, the Second Division remained fixed at ten teams and operated without a promotion or relegation system involving lower leagues, limiting the chances of advancement for clubs from the Lima League.

=== Promotion to the First Division (1961) ===
The club made its top-flight debut in the 1961 season, finishing in sixth place. In 1965, the team achieved fourth place, with Carlos Urrunaga emerging as the league’s top scorer with 16 goals.

In the 1967 Torneo Descentralizado, Defensor Lima once again finished fourth. Notably, in the penultimate match of that campaign, the team defeated Deportivo Municipal, a result that ultimately led to their relegation.

=== First Title (1973) ===
In 1970, while the Peruvian national team was preparing for the 1970 FIFA World Cup, Defensor Lima took part in the 1970 Copa Presidente de la República, also known as the “Mundialito.” This tournament, organized by the Peruvian Football Association, aimed to keep domestic clubs active ahead of the Descentralizado season and included invited teams from the Copa Perú such as Melgar, Unión Ocopilla, and Deportivo Garcilaso. Defensor Lima reached the semifinals, where they were defeated 1–0 by Melgar.

That same year, businessman Luis Banchero Rossi assumed the club’s presidency, integrating the institution into the business group Operaciones y Servicios S.A. (OYSSA). His financial backing and strategic vision strengthened the squad, highlighted by the hiring of Uruguayan coach Roque Máspoli and the incorporation of key players from the Peruvian national team.

Although Banchero Rossi was assassinated on January 1, 1972, the project continued under OYSSA. Despite the impact of his death, Defensor Lima remained a competitive force in the national championship. In both the 1972 and 1973 seasons, Francisco Gonzales finished as the top scorer of the Peruvian Primera División, with 20 and 25 goals respectively, playing a decisive role in the club’s rise to its first national title.

In 1973, Defensor Lima assembled a highly competitive squad by recruiting several players who formed part of the core of the Peruvian national team. This team is remembered for the quality of its players and the respect it earned from both fans and rivals. Among its figures were Gerónimo Barbadillo, José Fernández, Guillermo La Rosa, César Peralta, José Navarro, and Roberto Chale, as well as the Argentine players Miguel Tojo, Néstor Verderi, and Pedro Alexis González.

Under the management of Uruguayan coach Roque Máspoli, Defensor Lima won the only professional title in its history that same year. To cap off the campaign, on December 22, 1973, they defeated Alianza Lima 3–0 in a match notable for the five players sent off from the opposing side.

=== Notable participation in the 1974 Copa Libertadores ===
After qualifying as Peruvian champions, Defensor Lima competed in the 1974 Copa Libertadores, where they finished first in their group during the initial stage, ahead of El Nacional, Universidad Católica, and Sporting Cristal.

This performance secured their qualification to the semifinals, where they were ultimately eliminated by São Paulo FC and Millonarios.

=== 1974 Copa Simón Bolívar ===
He was invited to take part in the fourth edition of the tournament (with the exception of the 1972 edition, which featured only two teams), an international club competition held in Venezuela under a round-robin format, by virtue of being the Peruvian champion.

The tournament was played in January 1975 and brought together the league champions of the 1973 season from the countries liberated during Simón Bolívar’s northern independence campaign. On this occasion, there was no representative from Bolivia; the remaining participants were: Atlético Nacional, El Nacional and Portuguesa F.C.

Defensor Lima were crowned champions of the tournament in an unbeaten campaign, becoming the first Peruvian club to win an international title (later achieved by Alianza Lima in 1976, Cienciano with the Copa Sudamericana in 2003, and Universitario de Deportes with the U-20 Copa Libertadores in 2011).

The starting XI fielded throughout the tournament, with the lineup used in the final match against Portuguesa FC, was as follows: Néstor Verderi; José Navarro, José Fernández, Eduardo Stucchi, Antonio Trigueros; Raúl Párraga, Carlos Valdivia, Roberto “Titín” Drago; Francisco Gonzales, Guillermo La Rosa and Gerónimo Barbadillo.

=== Expropriation and relegation to the Liga Mayor de Lima ===
During the de facto government of Juan Velasco Alvarado, the companies of the Banchero Group (OYSSA) were expropriated, as a result of which the club came under state control, managed by the Ministry of Fisheries.

Without its former financial backing and hindered by limited state management, the team struggled near the bottom of the table from 1975 onward. It managed to remain in the top flight until the 1978 Torneo Descentralizado, after which it was relegated to the national stage of the Copa Perú in 1979. There, it advanced past the first phase but finished third in the final hexagonal round, where only the champion earned promotion.

Having failed to achieve promotion, and with no second division to fall back on (as it had been dissolved by the military government since 1973), the club entered the Región IX Metropolitana in 1980. This competition—initially without direct promotion, functioned as a higher-level regional league comprising district teams exclusively from Metropolitan Lima. At the time, Región IV provided qualification for teams from Ica, Callao, and other provinces of the Lima department.

Although Región IX did not grant direct promotion to the first division, it did offer access to the national stage. Despite the difficult circumstances, Defensor Lima finished as runners-up; however, this was not enough to qualify, as only the champion advanced. The club thus remained in Región IX Metropolitana, which served as the next tier above the Liga Mayor de Fútbol de Lima.

=== Return to the Segunda División (1985) ===
Years later, in 1985, while competing in the Liga Mayor de Fútbol de Lima, the club was invited to contest one of the promotion spots to the Peruvian Segunda División, which it successfully secured after playing in the Intermedia B.

In 1987, the team finished third, a prelude to the strong campaign that would ultimately earn promotion. In 1988, Defensor Lima returned to the top flight under the guidance of Roberto Chale, after being crowned champions of the second division, defeating Juventud La Palma in a playoff decided by a penalty shootout.

=== Promotion to the Primera División (1989) ===
With the title, the club qualified for the 1989 Torneo Descentralizado, a regional format in which it was placed in the Metropolitan Zone, exclusively for teams from Lima, Callao, and Ica. In its first season, the team achieved very encouraging results, including a 4–0 thrashing of Universitario de Deportes at the Estadio Teodoro Lolo Fernández.

A break in the tournament then took place due to the participation of the Peru national football team in the 1989 Copa América and the qualifiers for the 1990 FIFA World Cup. During this period, the Torneo Plácido Galindo was played.

In the final, Defensor Lima faced Universitario de Deportes over two legs, both played at the Estadio Nacional, with the tie ultimately decided by a penalty shootout. Defensor Lima emerged as champions with a 5–4 victory, in a competition that held official status as it granted the winner qualification to the pre–Liguilla of the Regional II tournament that same year.

Regional Championships were played in Peru until 1991. On March 24, 1991, Julinho (Julio César de Andrade Moura) made his top-flight debut wearing the maroon jersey.

That same year, Defensor Lima reached the final liguilla of the Regional II tournament, which allowed the club to be invited to take part in the 1992 Torneo Descentralizado following the restructuring of the league system. This invitation came after finishing fourth in the 1991 Metropolitan tournament.

=== Top-flight survival (1993) ===
In 1993, the club finished third from bottom and was forced to play a relegation playoff against FBC Aurora. The match, played on January 23, 1994, at the Estadio Nacional, ended in a 3–3 draw, with Defensor Lima prevailing 7–6 in the penalty shootout.

Goalkeeper Miguel Munayco delivered an outstanding performance, saving two penalties and scoring once in the shootout himself, ensuring that the maroon side retained its place in the top division.

=== Final season in the Primera División (1994) ===
In the 1994 Torneo Descentralizado, Defensor Lima finished bottom of the table and was automatically relegated, conceding heavy defeats throughout the campaign, including a historic 1–11 loss to eventual champions Sporting Cristal. That season exposed the club’s poor management and the difficult situation it was going through.

On November 27, 1994, Defensor Lima brought its top-flight campaign to a close with a 1–6 defeat against Ciclista Lima, with Luis Kajatt scoring the team’s final goal in the first division.

=== Segunda División (1995–1997) ===
The team had a modest and inconsistent spell in the second tier. Upon returning to the Peruvian Segunda División in 1995, Defensor Lima finished in eighth place. The following year, 1996, saw a change in the club’s board, but external and unforeseen circumstances disrupted that initiative, and the team repeated the same position as the previous season.

In 1997, the Peruvian Football Federation and the Asociación Deportiva de Fútbol Profesional de Segunda División decided that four teams would be relegated. Defensor Lima finished second from bottom and was relegated to the Copa Perú for the 1998 season, where it had to start from the Interligas de Lima Metropolitana stage, ultimately being eliminated.

=== Return to its original league (1999) ===
The club returned to its roots in the Liga Distrital de Fútbol del Cercado de Lima. During the first decade of the 21st century, Defensor Lima managed to win its district league title in 2003 and had several appearances in the Interligas, though it did not progress much further in those competitions.

On its 78th anniversary, the club was still competing in the Liga Distrital de Cercado de Lima. Atlético Defensor Lima continued participating in the top division of the Liga Distrital de Cercado de Lima until 2008.

=== Affiliation to the Liga Distrital de Breña (2010) ===
In 2009, the club withdrew from the Liga Distrital de Fútbol del Cercado de Lima and, due to relocation, joined the Liga Distrital de Fútbol de Breña in 2010, where it remains to this day. The team commonly uses the Gran Unidad Escolar Mariano Melgar Stadium, located in the district of Breña, as its home ground.

== Data ==
- Foundation: July 31 1931
- Historical position among Peruvian teams in the Copa Libertadores de America: 11°
- Club Atlético Defensor Lima, Universitario, Alianza Lima and Sporting Cristal are the only Peruvian Clubs that have reached semi-finals.
- Historical position in First Division: 16°.

== Honours ==
=== Senior titles ===
Keys

- Record
- ^{(s)} Shared record

Type	Competition	Titles	Runner-up	Winning years	Runner-up years
National (League)	Primera División	1	—	1973	—
National (League)	Segunda División	2	—	1960, 1988	—
Half-year / Short tournament (League)	Torneo Plácido Galindo	1	—	1989	—
Half-year / Short tournament (League)	Torneo Interzonal	—	1	—	1972 Metropolitano
Regional (League)	Liga Mayor de Fútbol de Lima	—	1	—	1980
Regional (League)	Triangular de Ascenso a Segunda División	1	—	1957	—
Regional (League)	Primera División Amateur de Lima	2	—	1951, 1957	—
Regional (League)	Liga Distrital del Cercado de Lima	1	5	2003	1980, 1981, 2000, 2002, 2008
Regional (League)	Liga Distrital de Breña	—	2	—	2017, 2022
Regional (League)	Segunda División Regional de Lima y Callao	—	1	—	1949 Serie A
Regional (League)	Segunda División Amateur de Lima	1	1	1938 Zona Oeste	1937 Zona Oeste
Regional (League)	Tercera División Amateur de Lima	—	1	—	1936 Zona Oeste
International (Cups)	Copa Simón Bolívar (FVF)	1^{(s)}	—	1974	—

== Performance in CONMEBOL competitions ==
- Copa Libertadores: 1 appearance

1974: Semi-Finals

- Copa Simón Bolivar: 1 appearance

1975: Winners

== Notable players ==
- (Peru) Carlos Oliva (1964–68, 1975–78)
- (Peru) Carlos Urrunaga (1964–68)
- (Peru) Pedro Ruiz (1967–71, 1973)
- (Peru) Francisco Gonzales León (1967–68, 1970, 1973–75, 1977–78)
- (Peru) Antonio Trigueros (1970–75)
- (Argentina) Pedro Alexis González (1971–74)
- (Peru) Roberto Chale (1971–73)
- (Peru) Enrique Casaretto (1971–72)
- (Argentina) Miguel Tojo (1972–73)
- (Peru) Gerónimo Barbadillo (1973–75)
- (Peru) Héctor Bailetti (1973–74)
- (Peru) Guillermo La Rosa (1973–75)
- (Brazil) Julinho (1991–92)

== See also ==
- Peruvian football league system
