= 1940 Ligas Provinciales de Lima y Callao =

Ligas Provinciales de Lima y Callao
- Season: 1940
- Dates: 13 October 1940 – 22 December 1940
- Champions: Santiago Barranco; Telmo Carbajo
- Relegated: Alianza Libertad; Alianza Pino; White Star; Sportivo Melgar; Scuola Deportiva Italia

The 1940 Ligas Provinciales de Lima y Callao, the second division of Peruvian football (soccer), was played by 19 teams (11 from the Liga Provincial de Lima and eight from the Liga Provincial del Callao). From 1931 until 1942 the points system was W:3, D:2, L:1, walkover:0.

Santiago Barranco and Telmo Carbajo, as champions of their respective leagues, qualified for the Promotion Playoff (Liguilla de Promoción). However, only Telmo Carbajo secured promotion to the 1941 Peruvian Primera División after winning the playoff tiebreaker match 3–2 against Santiago Barranco.

== Teams ==
=== Team changes ===
Relegated from 1939 Primera División	Promoted to 1939 Primera División	Promoted from 1939 División Intermedia (Lima)	Relegated from 1939 Liga Provincial de Lima
▼ Atlético Córdoba (8th)	▲ Alianza Lima (1st)	▲ Porvenir Miraflores (1st) ▲ Alianza Libertad (2nd)	▼ Sportivo Uruguay (10th) ▼ Miguel Grau (11th)

=== Stadia and Locations ===
Team	City
Alianza Libertad	Lince, Lima
Atlético Córdoba	Barrios Altos, Lima
Atlético Lusitania	Barrios Altos, Lima
Centro Iqueño	Cercado de Lima
Independencia Miraflores	Miraflores, Lima
Jorge Chávez	Callao
Juventud Gloria	Cercado de Lima
Juventud Perú	Barrios Altos, Lima
Porvenir Miraflores	Miraflores, Lima
Progresista Apurímac	Callao
Santiago Barranco	Barranco, Lima
Scuola Deportiva Italia	Callao
Social San Carlos	Callao
Sportivo Melgar	Cercado de Lima
Sportivo Palermo	Callao
Telmo Carbajo	Callao
Unión Carbone	Barrios Altos, Lima
Unión Estrella	Callao
White Star	Callao

== Liga Provincial de Lima ==
=== Primeros Equipos ===
Pos	Team	Pld	W	D	L	GF	GA	GD	Pts
1	Santiago Barranco	10	6	3	1	21	8	+13	25
2	Juventud Gloria	10	5	3	2	11	8	+3	23
3	Centro Iqueño	10	3	5	2	16	10	+6	21
4	Atlético Córdoba	10	4	3	3	11	9	+2	21
5	Porvenir Miraflores	10	4	3	3	11	11	0	21
6	Independencia Miraflores	10	4	3	3	14	14	0	21
7	Atlético Lusitania	10	1	7	2	9	8	+1	19
8	Unión Carbone	10	3	3	4	12	14	−2	19
9	Sportivo Melgar	10	3	3	4	12	15	−3	19
10	Juventud Perú	10	2	4	4	12	10	+2	18
11	Alianza Libertad	10	1	1	8	5	24	−19	13

==== Results ====
Teams play each other once, either home or away. The matches were played only in Lima.

Home \ Away	LIB	COR	LUS	CEN	IND	GLO	JUV	POR	SAN	MEL	CAR
Alianza Libertad		1–0				0–2			0–3		
Atlético Córdoba			1–1		0–1	3–0				1–1	2–2
Atlético Lusitania	0–0			0–0	3–0	1–1	1–1	0–0			
Centro Iqueño	5–2	1–2					0–0	1–2		3–2	4–1
Independencia Miraflores	5–0			1–1		0–1		2–2			1–0
Juventud Gloria				0–0			2–0	1–1		3–0	
Juventud Perú	6–1	0–1			1–2				1–1		1–1
Porvenir Miraflores	2–0	0–1					1–0		1–3	0–3	
Santiago Barranco		2–0	0–0	1–1	4–0	0–1					
Sportivo Melgar	1–0		2–1		2–2		0–2		1–3		0–0
Unión Carbone	2–1		1–0			3–0		0–2	2–3		

Updated to match(es) played on unknown. Source: Diario El Comercio, La Prensa and Crónica.
Legend: Blue = home team win; Yellow = draw; Red = away team win.

=== Tabla Absoluta ===
Pos	Team	Pld	W	D	L	GF	GA	GD	Pts	Resv.	Total	Qualification or relegation
1	Santiago Barranco	10	6	3	1	21	8	+13	25	3.375	28.375	Qualified to the Liguilla de Promoción
2	Juventud Gloria	10	5	3	2	11	8	+3	23	4.25	27.25	1941 Segunda División Regional de Lima y Callao
3	Centro Iqueño	10	3	5	2	16	10	+4	21	3.5	24.5	1941 Segunda División Regional de Lima y Callao
4	Atlético Córdoba	10	4	3	3	11	9	+2	21	2.75	23.75	1941 Segunda División Regional de Lima y Callao
5	Porvenir Miraflores	10	4	3	3	11	11	0	21	2.75	23.75	1941 Segunda División Regional de Lima y Callao
6	Independencia Miraflores	10	4	3	3	14	14	0	21	1.75	22.75	1941 Segunda División Regional de Lima y Callao
7	Atlético Lusitania	10	1	7	2	9	8	+1	19	3.25	22.25	1941 Segunda División Regional de Lima y Callao
8	Unión Carbone	10	3	3	4	12	14	−2	19	2.75	21.75	1941 Segunda División Regional de Lima y Callao
9	Juventud Perú	10	2	4	4	12	10	+2	18	3.5	21.5	1941 Segunda División Regional de Lima y Callao
10	Sportivo Melgar	10	3	3	4	12	15	−3	19	2.375	21.375	Relegation play-off
11	Alianza Libertad	10	1	1	8	5	24	−19	13	2	15	Relegation play-off

Santiago Barranco qualified for the Liguilla de Promoción a Primera División.

== Liga Provincial del Callao ==
=== Serie A ===
Pos	Team	Pld	W	D	L	GF	GA	GD	Pts	Promotion or relegation	SAN	PAL	CHA	WHI
1	Social San Carlos	3	2	1	0	8	4	+4	8	Title Play-off			1–0	
2	Sportivo Palermo	3	2	0	1	8	9	−1	7	1941 Segunda División Regional de Lima y Callao	3–6			2–1
3	Jorge Chávez	3	1	0	2	7	5	+2	5	1941 Segunda División Regional de Lima y Callao		2–3		
4	White Star	3	0	1	2	3	8	−5	4	Relegation play-off	1–1		3–5	

Legend: Blue = home team win; Yellow = draw; Red = away team win.

=== Serie B ===
Pos	Team	Pld	W	D	L	GF	GA	GD	Pts	Promotion or relegation	TEL	PRO	UES	SCU
1	Telmo Carbajo	3	3	0	0	15	3	+12	9	Title Play-off			5–1	7–1
2	Progresista Apurímac	3	2	0	1	8	5	+3	7	1941 Segunda División Regional de Lima y Callao	1–3			
3	Unión Estrella	3	1	0	2	7	10	−3	5	1941 Segunda División Regional de Lima y Callao		2–1		5–3
4	Scuola Deportiva Italia	3	0	0	3	5	17	−12	3	Relegation play-off		1–5		

Legend: Blue = home team win; Yellow = draw; Red = away team win.

==== 7th Place Play-off ====
19 March 1941

White Star	0–0	Scuola Deportiva Italia

Callao

==== 3rd Place Play-off ====
19 March 1941

Progresista Apurímac	1–0	Sportivo Palermo

Callao

==== Title Play-off ====
19 March 1941

Social San Carlos	1–5	Telmo Carbajo

Callao

Telmo Carbajo qualified for the Liguilla de Promoción a Primera División.

== Relegation Play-off ==
The bottom teams of the Liga Provincial de Lima (Alianza Libertad and Sportivo Melgar) and the Liga Provincial del Callao (Scuola Deportiva Italia and White Star) were required to play a relegation play-off against the top teams from the 1940 División Intermedia de Lima (Miguel Grau and Alianza Pino) and the top teams from the 1940 División Intermedia del Callao (Santiago Rossell and Alianza Tucumán) to determine the clubs qualified for the 1941 Segunda División Regional de Lima y Callao.

=== Standings ===
Pos	Team	Pld	W	D	L	GF	GA	GD	Pts	Qualification or relegation	SAN	GRA	TUC	LIB	PIN	WHI	MEL	SCU
1	Santiago Rossell	7	6	1	0	5	1	+4	20	1941 Segunda División Regional de Lima y Callao		1–0	1–0			W.O.	1–0	W.O.
2	Miguel Grau	7	5	0	2	7	4	+3	17	1941 Segunda División Regional de Lima y Callao				3–1		2–1	W.O.	W.O.
3	Alianza Tucumán	7	2	4	1	3	3	0	15	Triangular de Desempate		1–0			1–0		1–1	W.O.
4	Alianza Libertad	7	3	2	2	6	7	−1	15	Triangular de Desempate	1–2		1–1		0–0	1–0		W.O.
5	Alianza Pino	7	2	4	1	2	3	−1	15	Triangular de Desempate	0–0	0–2						W.O.
6	White Star	7	1	3	3	2	4	−2	12	1941 Tercera División Regional de Lima y Callao			0–0		1–1			W.O.
7	Sportivo Melgar	7	1	2	4	2	5	−3	11	1941 Tercera División Regional de Lima y Callao				1–2	0–1	0–0		W.O.
8	Scuola Deportivo Italia	0	0	0	0	0	0	0	0	Withdrew from the competition								

Legend: Blue = home team win; Yellow = draw; Red = away team win.

=== Triangular de Desempate ===
Pos	Team	Pld	W	D	L	GF	GA	GD	Pts	Qualification or relegation	TUC	LIB	PIN
1	Alianza Tucumán	2	2	0	0	3	0	+3	6	1941 Segunda División Regional de Lima y Callao		1–0	
2	Alianza Libertad	2	0	1	1	1	2	−1	3	1941 Tercera División Regional de Lima y Callao			1–1
3	Alianza Pino	2	0	1	1	1	3	−2	3	1941 Tercera División Regional de Lima y Callao	0–2		

Legend: Blue = home team win; Yellow = draw; Red = away team win.

== Liguilla de Promoción a Primera División ==
=== Standings ===
Pos	Team	Pld	W	D	L	GF	GA	GD	Pts	Qualification or relegation	SUC	SAN	TEL	CIC
1	Sucre	3	3	0	0	16	2	+14	9			3–2	6–0	
2	Santiago Barranco	3	1	1	1	6	6	0	6	Relegation play-off				2–1
3	Telmo Carbajo (O)	3	1	1	1	5	9	−4	6	Relegation play-off		2–2		3–1
4	Ciclista Lima (R)	3	0	0	3	2	12	−10	3	1941 Segunda Regional de Lima y Callao	0–7			

Legend: Blue = home team win; Yellow = draw; Red = away team win.
(O) Play-off winners; (R) Relegated

=== Relegation play-off ===
Because Telmo Carbajo and Santiago Barranco tied with 6 points a relegation play-off on neutral ground will be played as the tournament rules specify.

14 April 1941

Telmo Carbajo	3–2	Santiago Barranco

Estadio Nacional, Lima

== See also ==
- 1940 Peruvian Primera División
