= 1945 Peruvian Primera División =

Peruvian Primera División
- Season: 1945
- Dates: 5 August 1945 – 25 November 1945
- Champions: Universitario (5th title)
- Runner up: Deportivo Municipal
- Relegated: none
- Matches: 56
- Goals: 270 (4.82 per match)
- Top goalscorer: Teodoro Fernández (16 goals)

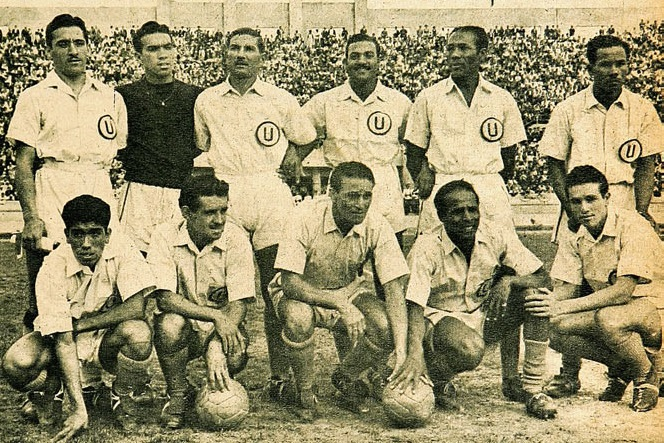
Universitario, Estadio, 1945.

The 1945 season of the Peruvian Primera División, the top category of Peruvian football, was played by 8 teams. The national champions were Universitario.

No team was promoted or relegated.

== Teams ==
Team	City	Mannager
Alianza Lima	La Victoria, Lima	(Spain) Domingo Arrillaga
Atlético Chalaco	Callao	
Centro Iqueño	Cercado de Lima	(Peru) Alfonso Huapaya
Deportivo Municipal	Cercado de Lima	(Peru) Juan Valdivieso
Sport Boys	Callao	(Chile) Abelardo Robles
Sporting Tabaco	Rímac, Lima	(Peru) Narciso León
Sucre	La Victoria, Lima	
Universitario	Cercado de Lima	(Peru) Arturo Fernández

== League table ==
=== Standings ===
Pos	Team	Pld	W	D	L	GF	GA	GD	Pts	Qualification or relegation
1	Universitario (C)	14	10	1	3	49	23	+26	21	Champions
2	Deportivo Municipal	14	8	3	3	46	33	+13	19	
3	Atlético Chalaco	14	9	1	4	35	23	+12	19	
4	Alianza Lima	14	6	1	7	31	31	0	13	
5	Sucre	14	3	7	4	22	23	−1	13	
6	Sporting Tabaco	14	4	3	7	28	46	−18	11	
7	Centro Iqueño	14	3	4	7	30	44	−14	10	
8	Sport Boys (O)	14	2	2	10	29	47	−18	6	Promotion/relegation play-off

(C) Champions; (O) Play-off winners

== Results ==
Home \ Away	ALI	CHA	IQU	MUN	SBA	TAB	SUC	UNI
Alianza Lima		3–1	3–2	4–2	2–5	4–0	1–1	1–3
Atlético Chalaco	1–3		2–1	5–3	4–0	5–1	0–3	4–3
Centro Iqueño	3–2	0–3		4–4	1–2	3–3	2–2	3–3
Deportivo Municipal	2–0	2–2	6–1		4–2	3–2	4–1	0–5
Sport Boys	5–6	0–2	1–2	1–4		2–3	2–2	3–6
Sporting Tabaco	3–1	3–2	2–3	3–8	5–2		1–1	0–3
Sucre	1–0	1–3	4–1	2–2	2–2	1–1		0–2
Universitario	2–1	0–1	7–4	1–2	4–2	8–1	2–1	

Updated to match(es) played on 1945. Source: Diario El Comercio, La Prensa and Crónica.
Legend: Blue = home team win; Yellow = draw; Red = away team win.

== Promotion/relegation play-off ==
The promotion/relegation play-off was a two-legged series played by the team placing 8th in the 1945 Primera División, Sport Boys and the 1945 Segunda División champion Santiago Barranco.

20 January 1946	Santiago Barranco	1–3	Sport Boys	Estadio Nacional, Lima
15:30	Netto 66'		Guillermo Valdiviezo 12'; Guillermo Arias 17'; Guillermo Barbadillo 40'	Referee: Félix Salazar

27 January 1946	Sport Boys	2–0	Santiago Barranco	Estadio Nacional, Lima
15:30	Manuel Drago 20' 38'			Referee: Félix Salazar

Sport Boys remain in the Primera División.

== Top scorers ==
Rank	Player	Club	Goals
1	(Peru) Teodoro Fernández	Universitario	16
2	(Peru) Eduardo Fernández	Universitario	12
3	(Peru) Roberto Drago	Deportivo Municipal	11
4	(Peru) Víctor Espinoza	Universitario	10
5	(Peru) Julio Ayllón	Sucre	9

== See also ==
- 1945 Campeonato de Apertura
- 1945 Peruvian Segunda División
- 1945 Torneo Relámpago
