= Teodoro Fernández =

Peruvian footballer (1913–1996)

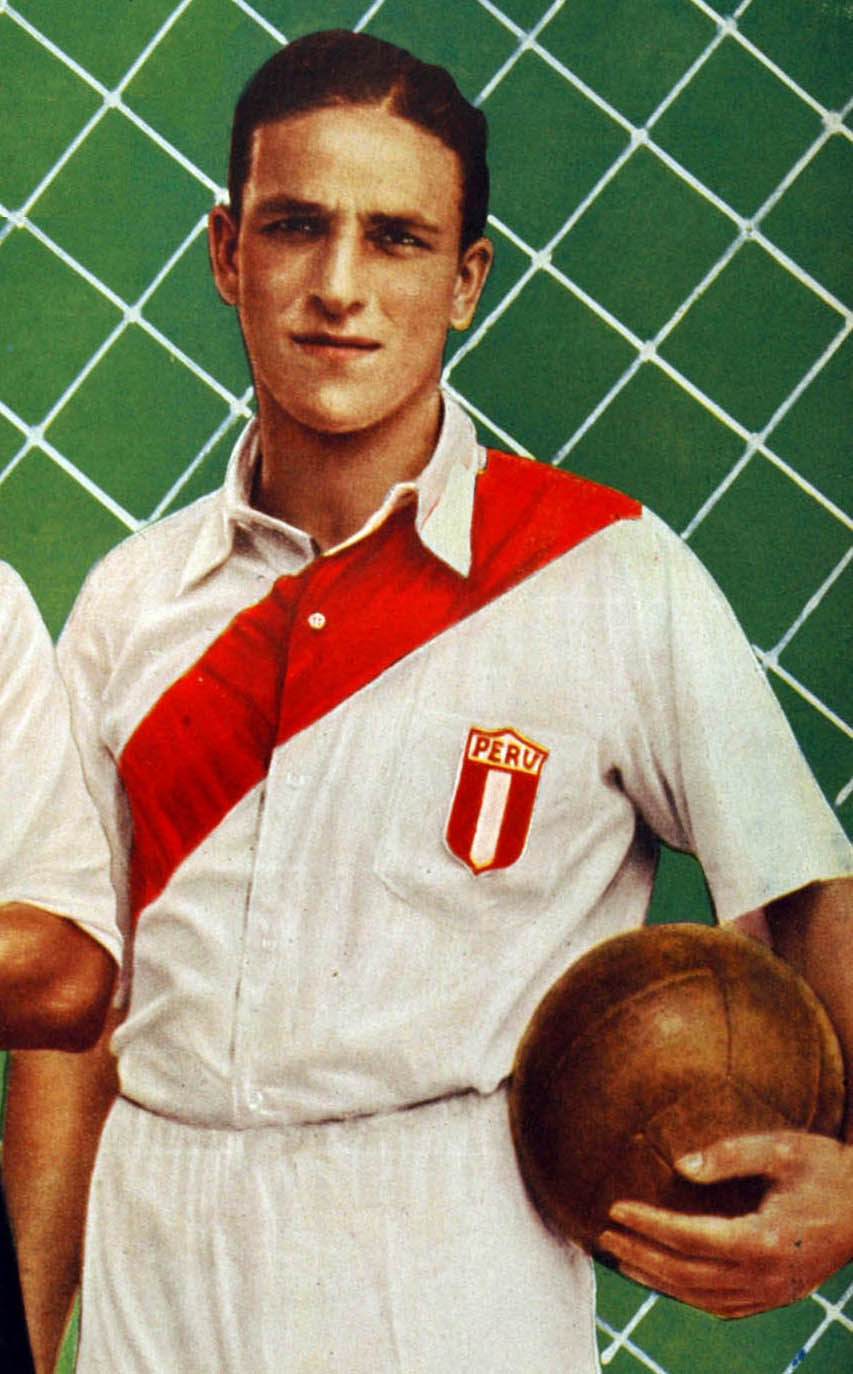
- Fernández with the Peru national team in 1937

Personal information
- Full name: Teodoro Fernández Meyzán
- Date of birth: 20 May 1913
- Place of birth: Cañete, Peru
- Date of death: 17 September 1996 (aged 83)
- Place of death: Lima, Peru
- Height: 1.80 m (5 ft 11 in)
- Position: Forward

Youth career
- Universitario

Senior career*
Years	Team	Apps	(Gls)
1931–1953	Universitario	180	(156)

International career
1935–1947	Peru	32	(24)
Medal record
Men's football
Representing Peru
Bolivarian Games
Gold medal – first place	1938 Bogotá
Copa América
Winner	1939 Lima
Third place	1935 Lima
- * Club domestic league appearances and goals

Teodoro "Lolo" Fernández Meyzán (20 May 1913 – 17 September 1996) was a Peruvian professional footballer who played as forward. All his football work was carried out as a player of the Universitario de Deportes of the Peruvian First Division. He was champion, best player and top scorer in the 1939 Copa América. He is the top idol of Universitario de Deportes and Peruvian First Division.

Fernández is the most emblematic player in the history of club Universitario de Deportes for which he played his whole career, winning six times the Primera División Peruana. Although he sporadically reinforced other clubs in friendly matches, clubs such as Alianza Lima and Colo-Colo, Fernández never represented a club other than Universitario in official competitions. Known as "El Cañonero" ("The Cannoneer") due to his excellence as a centre-forward and his strong shooting, Fernández was the Primera División Peruana top-scorer seven times.

== Club career ==
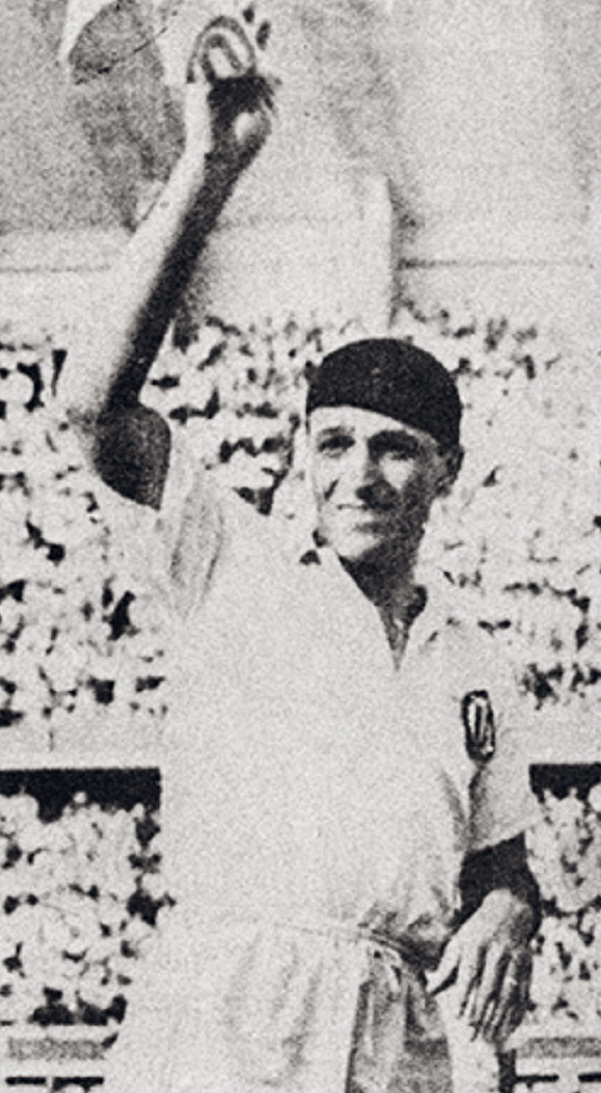
Fernandez in his last professional match with Universitario de Deportes in 1953

Lolo was the seventh of Raymunda Meyzán and Tomas Fernández's eight children. He learned to play football in primary school and was soon picked up by local club Huracán de Hualcará where he immediately stood out. At the age of 16, his parents sent him to Lima to continue his studies. Lolo stayed with his brother Arturo Fernandez who was the goalkeeper for Ciclista Lima. When Arturo transferred to first-division Universitario de Deportes, he brought Lolo along to play a bit of football in training and introduced him to the club's president, former 1930 World Cup player Placido Galindo, who decided to sign him. Lolo would remain with the club during his 22 years as a professional footballer.

He made his professional debut with Universitario de Deportes in a friendly match against Club Deportivo Magallanes of Chile on 29 November 1931, scoring the game's only goal. In his first season (1932) he became Peruvian top scorer, the team finished second. The following year, the same feat was repeated.

The 1934 season saw Lolo lead the division in scoring, winning the Primera División Peruana trophy for the only second time in its history. Lolo obtained 6 local leagues as player in total, all with Universitario de Deportes: 1934, 1939, 1941, 1945, 1946 and 1949.

Several times during his career he rejected offers from teams such as in Chile, Argentina and Europe. Rumor has it Chile offered him a "blank check", for he to write in what he wished to be paid. He did not go with Chile. However, he represented Colo-Colo in friendly matches against the Argentine club Independiente in October 1940, alongside his compatriots César Socarraz, Pablo Pasache and his brother Arturo.

Lolo played his last game for Universitario on 30 August 1953 at the age of 40 in the Peruvian Super Classic during which he scored a hat-trick for a 4–2 win.

Lolo is the top goalscorer for Universitario with 161 goals in 180 matches.

== International career ==
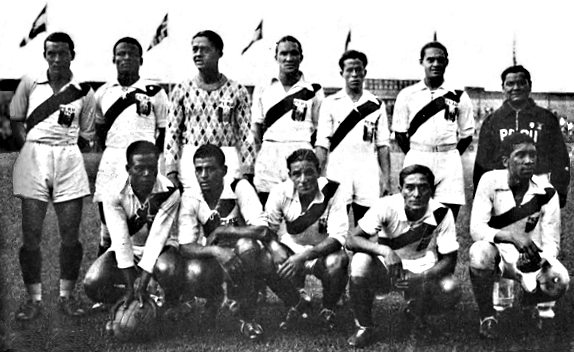
Peru football team that took part in the 1936 Summer Olympics. Front Row: Magallanes, Alcalde, Teodoro Fernández, Morales, and Villanueva. Back Row: Tovar, Lavalle, Valdivieso, Arturo Fernández, Castillo, Jordán, and Coach Alberto Denegri.

Lolo played for the Peru national football team from 1935 to 1947, and scored 24 goals in 32 matches. He is the fourth top scorer in history for his country.

In 1936, he represented Peru at the 1936 Olympic Games in Berlin. Peru made its way into the quarterfinals after defeating Finland (7–2) and went on to beat Austria (4–2). Lolo Fernandez scored a total of 6 goals in the two games.

In the 1938 Bolivarian Games in Bogotá, Team Peru won gold.

In 1939, he won the Copa America with the national team. The final was played against Uruguay (2–1) which was arguably the best team in the world at the time, as Uruguay had won gold in the 1924 and 1928 Summer Olympics and had won the first World Cup in 1930.

Lolo was top scorer of the tournament with 7 goals.

== Peru-Chile XI (Combinado del Pacífico) ==
Fernández was part of the "Combinado del Pacífico" (Peru-Chile XI) a squad of Peruvian and Chilean footballers of Alianza Lima, Atlético Chalaco, Colo-Colo and Universitario de Deportes that played 39 friendly matches in Europe between September 1933 and March 1934 against teams such as FC Barcelona, Celtic FC, Hearts FC, Newcastle United FC, West Ham United FC and FC Bayern Munich. With 48 goals, Fernández was the team's main goalscorer during the European tour.

Teodoro Fernández
Medal record
Gold medal – first place	1938 Bolivarian Games	NA

== Personal life ==
He was the middle brother of the professional footballers Arturo, also a Peruvian international, and Eduardo Fernández. They also were the uncles of the footballers José, Jorge and Carlos Fernández.

== Career statistics ==
Scores and results list Peru's goal tally first, score column indicates score after each Fernández goal.

List of international goals scored by Teodoro Fernández
No.	Date	Venue	Opponent	Score	Result	Competition
1	20 January 1935	Estadio Nacional, Lima, Peru	Argentina	1–0	1–4	South American Championship 1935
2	4 August 1936	Hertha-BSC-Platz, Berlin, Germany	Finland	1–0	7–3	1936 Summer Olympics
3	4 August 1936	Hertha-BSC-Platz, Berlin, Germany	Finland	3–0	7–3	1936 Summer Olympics
4	4 August 1936	Hertha-BSC-Platz, Berlin, Germany	Finland	4–1	7–3	1936 Summer Olympics
5	4 August 1936	Hertha-BSC-Platz, Berlin, Germany	Finland	5–1	7–3	1936 Summer Olympics
6	4 August 1936	Hertha-BSC-Platz, Berlin, Germany	Finland	7–2	7–3	1936 Summer Olympics
7	8 August 1936	Hertha-BSC-Platz, Berlin, Germany	Austria	4–2	4–2 (a.e.t.)	1936 Summer Olympics
8	27 December 1936	Estadio Gasómetro, Buenos Aires, Argentina	Brazil	1–2	2–3	South American Championship 1937
9	6 January 1937	Estadio Gasómetro, Buenos Aires, Argentina	Uruguay	1–1	2–4	South American Championship 1937
10	8 August 1938	Estadio Universitario, Bogotá, Colombia	Colombia	2–0	4–2	1938 Bolivarian Games
11	14 August 1938	Estadio Universitario, Bogotá, Colombia	Bolivia	1–0	3–0	1938 Bolivarian Games
12	14 August 1938	Estadio Universitario, Bogotá, Colombia	Bolivia	3–0	3–0	1938 Bolivarian Games
13	15 January 1939	Estadio Nacional, Lima, Peru	Ecuador	1–0	5–2	South American Championship 1939
14	15 January 1939	Estadio Nacional, Lima, Peru	Ecuador	3–0	5–2	South American Championship 1939
15	15 January 1939	Estadio Nacional, Lima, Peru	Ecuador	5–1	5–2	South American Championship 1939
16	22 January 1939	Estadio Nacional, Lima, Peru	Chile	1–0	3–1	South American Championship 1939
17	22 January 1939	Estadio Nacional, Lima, Peru	Chile	2–1	3–1	South American Championship 1939
18	29 January 1939	Estadio Nacional, Lima, Peru	Paraguay	1–0	3–0	South American Championship 1939
19	29 January 1939	Estadio Nacional, Lima, Peru	Paraguay	2–0	3–0	South American Championship 1939
20	23 February 1941	Estadio Nacional, Santiago, Chile	Ecuador	1–0	4–0	South American Championship 1941
21	23 February 1941	Estadio Nacional, Santiago, Chile	Ecuador	2–0	4–0	South American Championship 1941
22	23 February 1941	Estadio Nacional, Santiago, Chile	Ecuador	4–0	4–0	South American Championship 1941
23	21 January 1942	Estadio Centenario, Montevideo, Uruguay	Brazil	1–2	1–2	South American Championship 1942
24	25 January 1942	Estadio Centenario, Montevideo, Uruguay	Argentina	1–1	1–3	South American Championship 1942

== Honours ==
Teodoro Fernández was recognized and honored in his lifetime and afterward. At the 27 October 1952 inauguration of Estadio Nacional, he received from the government the highest honors bestowed on an athlete. President Manuel Odría (1948–56), bestowed on him the Laureles Deportivos en Primera Clase for his outstanding career in Peruvian soccer. The Club Universitario de Deportes named their stadium after him. This stadium was opened officially 20 July of the same year with a friendly match against the University of Chile. The municipal stadium of the city of San Vicente de Cañete, on the central coast of Peru, is also named after him, along with a section of the Maison de Santé clinic where he spent the last months of his life.

The Peruvian composer Lorenzo Humberto Sotomayor dedicated his work Lolo Fernández to Fernández. Another work in his honor is the dance El Taita Lolo Fernández with music by Alcides Carreño and lyrics by Fernando Soria. In September 1996, one week following his passing, a banner was displayed with the phrase "Lolo Hasta Siempre Alianza Presente" during a match between Ciclista Lima and Alianza Lima, who are known college rivals. On 17 September 1997, during a match against Sporting Cristal in the Clausura tournament of that year, the university's players wore jerseys with Fernández's image printed on the chest. In 2013, during a celebration of the centennial of his birth, the Chermany Inks: La Kasa Roja gallery presented an exposition of paintings done by nine artists in honor of Fernández.

Individual

- Peruvian League: Top Scorer 1932, 1933, 1934, 1939, 1940, 1942, 1945
- 1939 South American Championship: Best Player
- 1939 South American Championship: Top Scorer

Records

- 3rd place of all-time Copa America goal scorers, 15 goals.
- All-time top scorer of the Peruvian Clásico, 29 goals.
- Peruvian league top-scorer for a record seven times.
- Highest individual scoring rate per Olympic match, 5 goals.
- Top goalscorer in Universitario de Deportes's history, 156 goals.

== See also ==
- List of one-club men in association football
