= 1947 Peruvian Segunda División =

Peruvian Segunda División
- Season: 1947
- Dates: 19 July 1947 – 9 November 1947
- Champions: Jorge Chávez
- Runner up: Santiago Barranco
- Relegated: Telmo Carbajo
- Matches: 56
- Goals: 178 (3.18 per match)

The 1947 Peruvian Segunda División, the second division of Peruvian football (soccer), was played by 8 teams. The tournament winner, Jorge Chávez was promoted to the 1948 Peruvian Primera División.

== Competition format ==
All teams faced each other in a double round-robin format, playing home and away matches. The team that accumulated the highest number of points at the end of the season was automatically crowned champion and promoted to the Peruvian Primera División, while the team with the fewest points was relegated to the Liga Regional de Lima y Callao.

== Teams ==
=== Team changes ===
Promoted from 1946 Liga Regional de Lima y Callao	Relegated from 1946 Primera División	Promoted to 1947 Primera División	Relegated to 1947 Liga Regional de Lima y Callao
▲ Carlos Concha (1st)	▼ Centro Iqueño (8th)	▲ Ciclista Lima (1st)	▼ Progresista Apurímac (8th)

=== Stadia and locations ===
Team	City
Association Chorrillos	Chorrillos, Lima
Atlético Lusitania	Cercado de Lima
Carlos Concha	Callao
Centro Iqueño	Cercado de Lima
Jorge Chávez	Callao
Santiago Barranco	Barranco, Lima
Telmo Carbajo	Callao
Unión Callao	Callao

== League table ==
=== Standings ===
Pos	Team	Pld	W	D	L	GF	GA	GD	Pts	Qualification or relegation
1	Jorge Chávez (C)	14	7	5	2	31	21	+10	19	1948 Primera División
2	Santiago Barranco	14	7	3	4	27	23	+4	17	
3	Unión Callao	14	7	3	4	22	18	+4	17	
4	Carlos Concha	14	6	3	5	26	22	+4	15	
5	Centro Iqueño	14	4	6	4	20	20	0	14	
6	Association Chorrillos	14	4	5	5	22	20	+2	13	
7	Atlético Lusitania	14	3	5	6	17	19	−2	11	
8	Telmo Carbajo (R)	14	3	0	11	13	35	−22	6	1948 Liga Regional de Lima y Callao

(C) Champions; (R) Relegated

== Results ==
Home \ Away	ACH	LUS	CON	CEN	CHA	SAN	TEL	UNI
Association Chorrillos		1–1	3–2	1–1	2–2	1–2	3–1	0–2
Atlético Lusitania	1–1		4–1	1–1	2–2	0–1	0–1	0–1
Carlos Concha	2–1	3–0		5–2	1–0	1–1	2–1	2–2
Centro Iqueño	0–0	0–1	1–1		2–2	2–1	2–3	3–0
Jorge Chávez	2–1	1–1	3–2	1–0		2–4	4–0	2–1
Santiago Barranco	0–3	2–1	3–2	2–2	1–4		3–1	1–1
Telmo Carbajo	1–3	1–4	0–2	0–1	2–4	1–5		0–2
Unión Callao	3–2	3–1	1–0	2–3	2–2	2–1	0–1	

Updated to match(es) played on 1947. Source: Diario El Comercio, La Prensa and Crónica.
Legend: Blue = home team win; Yellow = draw; Red = away team win.

== See also ==
- 1947 Peruvian Primera División
