= Julio Ayllón =

Peruvian footballer

Personal information
- Full name: Julio Aparicio Ayllón
- Place of birth: Peru
- Date of death: 1973
- Place of death: Mexico
- Position: Forward

Senior career*
Years	Team	Apps	(Gls)
- Santiago Barranco
- Telmo Carbajo
- Sucre FBC
1946–1949	U.D. Moctezuma		(42)
1949–1950	C.D. Veracruz	26	(30)
1950–1951	Club León		(10)
1952–1954	C.D. Tampico		(20)
- * Club domestic league appearances and goals

Julio Aparicio Ayllón, nicknamed El Negro Aparicio, was a Peruvian professional footballer who played as forward.

== Biography ==
A champion of Peru in 1944 with Sucre FBC, Ayllón moved to Mexico two years later to play for U.D. Moctezuma. In his first season, he won the Copa MX and the Super Cup.

With 30 goals scored in the 1947–48 and 1948–49 seasons (15 per season), he signed with C.D. Veracruz and won the 1949–50 championship, finishing as the league's top scorer with 30 goals in 26 matches.

Despite this performance, Ayllón was loaned to Club León, where he stayed for only one season before finishing his career at C.D. Tampico, the club where he won the Mexican championship in 1952–53 (the only championship won by this club to date).

Ayllón remained in Mexico, where he died in 1973.

== Honours ==
Sucre FBC

- Peruvian Primera División: 1944

U.D. Moctezuma

- Copa MX: 1947
- Super Cup: 1947

C.D. Veracruz

- Mexican Primera División: 1949–50
- Mexican Primera División Top scorer: 1949–50 (30 goals)

C.D. Tampico

- Mexican Primera División: 1952–53
- Super Cup: 1953
