= 1941 Segunda División Regional de Lima y Callao =

Liga Regional de Lima y Callao
- Season: 1941
- Champions: Santiago Barranco

The 1941 Segunda División Regional de Lima y Callao (also called Segunda Regional), the second division of Peruvian football, was played by 18 teams. The tournament winner, Santiago Barranco was promoted to the 1941 Liguilla de Promoción. However, Santiago Barranco and Centro Iqueño would be promoted anyway despite playing the Liguilla de Promoción, since it was decided that for the 1942 season the First Division would be expanded to 10 teams.

== Format ==
- The results of a reserve teams league were added as bonus points.
- The points system was W:3, D:2, L:1, walkover:0.

== Teams ==
=== Team changes ===
Relegated from 1940 Primera División	Transferred from 1940 Liga Provincial de Lima	Promoted from 1940 División Intermedia (Lima)	Transferred from 1940 Liga Provincial del Callao	Promoted from 1940 División Intermedia (Callao)
▼ Ciclista Lima (8th)	▲ Santiago Barranco (1st) ▲ Juventud Gloria (2nd) ▲ Centro Iqueño (3rd) ▲ Atlético Córdoba (4th) ▲ Porvenir Miraflores (5th) ▲ Independencia Miraflores (6th) ▲ Atlético Lusitania (7th) ▲ Unión Carbone (8th) ▲ Juventud Perú (9th)	▲ Miguel Grau (1st)	▲ Social San Carlos (2nd) ▲ Jorge Chávez (3rd) ▲ Unión Estrella (4th) ▲ Sportivo Palermo (5th) ▲ Progresista Apurímac (6th)	▲ Santiago Rossell (1st) ▲ Alianza Tucumán (2nd)

=== Stadia and locations ===
Team	City
Alianza Tucumán	Callao
Atlético Córdoba	Cercado de Lima
Atlético Lusitania	Cercado de Lima
Centro Iqueño	Cercado de Lima
Ciclista Lima	Cercado de Lima
Independencia Miraflores	Miraflores, Lima
Juventud Gloria	Cercado de Lima
Juventud Perú	Cercado de Lima
Jorge Chávez	Callao
Miguel Grau	Rímac, Lima
Porvenir Miraflores	Miraflores, Lima
Progresista Apurímac	Callao
Santiago Barranco	Barranco, Lima
Santiago Rossell	Callao
Social San Carlos	Callao
Sportivo Palermo	Callao
Unión Carbone	Cercado de Lima
Unión Estrella	Callao

== Segunda División Regional de Lima y Callao ==
=== Primeros Equipos ===
Pos	Team	Pld	W	D	L	GF	GA	GD	Pts	Qualification or relegation
1	Santiago Barranco	17	10	6	1	35	20	+15	43	Liguilla de Promoción
2	Centro Iqueño	17	9	7	1	29	10	+19	42	Liguilla de Promoción
3	Ciclista Lima	17	9	4	4	30	16	+14	39	1942 Primera División Regional de Lima y Callao
4	Unión Carbone	17	8	4	5	16	15	+1	37	1942 Primera División Regional de Lima y Callao
5	Alianza Tucumán	17	9	2	6	19	21	−2	37	1942 Primera División Regional de Lima y Callao
6	Jorge Chávez	17	8	3	6	35	25	+10	36	1942 Primera División Regional de Lima y Callao
7	Juventud Perú	17	7	5	5	15	13	+2	36	1942 Primera División Regional de Lima y Callao
8	Progresista Apurímac	17	5	9	3	18	17	+1	36	1942 Primera División Regional de Lima y Callao
9	Porvenir Miraflores	17	6	6	5	13	18	−5	35	1942 Primera División Regional de Lima y Callao
10	Atlético Lusitania	17	5	7	5	22	21	+1	34	1942 Primera División Regional de Lima y Callao
11	Social San Carlos	17	6	5	6	25	24	+1	34	1942 Segunda División Regional de Lima y Callao
12	Atlético Córdoba	17	6	4	7	22	19	+3	33	1942 Segunda División Regional de Lima y Callao
13	Juventud Gloria	17	5	4	8	14	18	−4	31	1942 Segunda División Regional de Lima y Callao
14	Sportivo Palermo	17	5	4	8	17	22	−5	31	1942 Segunda División Regional de Lima y Callao
15	Independencia Miraflores	17	4	4	9	14	33	−19	29	Relegation play-off
16	Miguel Grau	17	2	7	8	13	24	−11	28	Relegation play-off
17	Santiago Rossell	17	3	4	10	7	21	−14	27	Relegation play-off
18	Unión Estrella	17	3	1	13	12	21	−9	24	Relegation play-off

==== Results ====
Teams play each other once, either home or away. All matches were played in Lima and Callao.

Home \ Away	TUC	COR	LUS	CEN	CIC	IND	GLO	JUV	JCC	GRA	POR	PRO	SAN	ROS	SSC	PAL	CAR	EST
Alianza Tucumán		1–0			0–4	1–4				1–0	4–1			1–0			2–0	
Atlético Córdoba			2–2				2–0		5–0			1–2				0–0	1–2	3–0
Atlético Lusitania	1–2					3–0	0–1	0–0	2–5	2–0	0–0	3–0			2–2			1–0
Centro Iqueño	2–0	4–2	3–0						1–1		0–0		1–1		1–1		0–0	
Ciclista Lima		0–1	2–2	3–1		4–0	0–1	1–1	3–2		1–0	1–4			4–1	2–0		
Independencia Miraflores		0–0		0–2			0–1			1–4		0–0			3–0	1–3	0–2	1–0
Juventud Gloria	1–1			0–3						1–1	0–2	0–0	1–2			2–2		5–0
Juventud Perú	0–1	1–0		0–0		2–0	0–0				0–2	0–1						
Jorge Chávez	0–1					8–0	2–0	1–3			0–2	2–2	2–4	2–0			4–0	
Miguel Grau		2–0		1–3	0–0			0–1	1–1					0–0	0–4	0–2		0–2
Porvenir Miraflores		0–3				0–2				0–0			1–5		1–1		1–0	
Progresista Apurímac	0–0			0–0						2–2	1–1		1–1		2–1	0–1		2–1
Santiago Barranco	2–1	1–1	3–2		2–2	1–1		4–3		2–2				3–0		1–0		
Santiago Rossell		1–2	1–1	0–2	0–3	1–1	1–0	0–1			0–0	3–1			1–0	0–1		
Social San Carlos	3–0	3–1					0–1	0–0	1–4				2–1			1–0	3–1	2–2
Sportivo Palermo	2–1		0–1	1–3				2–2	2–3		0–2							
Unión Carbone			1–1		1–0		1–0	1–0		2–0		0–0	1–2	2–0		1–1		W.O.
Unión Estrella	1–2			1–3	W.O.			W.O.	W.O.		W.O.		1–2	2–0		2–0		

Updated to match(es) played on 1941. Source: Diario El Comercio, La Prensa and Crónica.
Legend: Blue = home team win; Yellow = draw; Red = away team win.

=== Tabla Absoluta ===
Pos	Team	Pld	W	D	L	GF	GA	GD	Pts	Resv.	Total	Qualification or relegation
1	Santiago Barranco	17	10	6	1	35	20	+15	43	6.375	49.375	Liguilla de Promoción
2	Centro Iqueño	17	9	7	1	29	10	+19	42	6.75	48.75	Liguilla de Promoción
3	Ciclista Lima	17	9	4	4	30	16	+15	39	5.125	44.125	
4	Juventud Perú	17	7	5	5	15	13	+2	36	6.75	42.75	
5	Unión Carbone	17	8	4	5	16	15	+1	37	5.25	42.25	
6	Jorge Chávez	17	8	3	6	35	25	+10	36	5.75	41.75	
7	Alianza Tucumán	17	9	2	6	19	21	−2	37	4.75	41.75	
8	Progresista Apurímac	17	5	9	3	18	17	+1	36	4.125	40.125	
9	Atlético Córdoba	17	6	4	7	22	19	+3	33	5.125	38.125	
10	Porvenir Miraflores	17	6	6	5	13	18	−5	35	3	38	
11	Social San Carlos	17	6	5	6	25	24	+1	34	3.5	37.5	
12	Atlético Lusitania	17	5	7	5	22	21	+1	34	2.625	36.625	
13	Juventud Gloria	17	5	4	8	14	18	−4	31	5.125	36.125	
14	Sportivo Palermo	17	5	4	8	17	22	−5	31	3.75	34.75	
15	Miguel Grau	17	2	7	8	13	24	−11	28	4.75	32.75	Relegation play-off
16	Independencia Miraflores	17	4	4	9	14	33	−19	29	3	32	Relegation play-off
17	Santiago Rossell	17	3	4	10	7	21	−14	27	3.625	30.625	Relegation play-off
18	Unión Estrella	17	3	1	13	12	21	−7	24	1.375	25.375	Relegation play-off

== Liguilla de Promoción ==
The teams place 7th and 8th in the 1941 Primera División (Atlético Chalaco and Telmo Carbajo) and the teams place 1st and 2nd in the 1941 Segunda División Regional de Lima y Callao (Santiago Barranco and Centro Iqueño) took part in the Liguilla de Promoción. No team was relegated as First Division grew to 10 teams.

=== Standings ===
Pos	Team	Pld	W	D	L	GF	GA	GD	Pts	Qualification or relegation	CEN	TEL	CHA	SAN
1	Centro Iqueño	3	1	2	0	6	3	+3	7	1942 Primera División		1–1	0–0	
2	Telmo Carbajo	3	1	2	0	5	2	+3	7	1942 Primera División			1–1	
3	Atlético Chalaco	3	1	2	0	3	2	+1	7	1942 Primera División				2–1
4	Santiago Barranco	3	0	0	3	3	10	−7	3	1942 Primera División	2–5	0–3		

Legend: Blue = home team win; Yellow = draw; Red = away team win.

== Relegation play-off ==
=== Standings ===
Pos	Team	Pld	W	D	L	GF	GA	GD	Pts	Qualification or relegation	SAN	DAR	KDT	ROM	ASS	GRA	EST	IND
1	Santiago Rossell	7	4	1	2	10	4	+6	16	1942 Segunda División Regional de Lima y Callao		0–1			1–0		1–0	5–0
2	Defensor Arica	7	2	5	0	9	7	+2	16	1942 Segunda División Regional de Lima y Callao			2–2	1–1			2–2	1–0
3	KDT Nacional	7	3	3	1	7	5	+2	16	1942 Segunda División Regional de Lima y Callao	3–1				1–0	1–0		0–0
4	Atlético Roma	7	3	2	2	7	5	+2	15	1942 Segunda División Regional de Lima y Callao	0–0		2–0				1–0	
5	Association Chorrillos	7	3	2	2	7	4	+3	15	1942 Segunda División Regional de Lima y Callao		0–0		1–0		1–1		4–1
6	Miguel Grau	7	2	3	2	6	6	0	14	1942 Tercera División Regional de Lima y Callao	0–2	2–2		2–0				
7	Unión Estrella	7	1	2	4	3	5	−2	11	1942 Tercera División Regional de Lima y Callao			0–0		0–1	0–1		
8	Independencia Miraflores	7	0	2	5	2	14	−12	9	1942 Tercera División Regional de Lima y Callao				1–3		0–0	0–1	

Legend: Blue = home team win; Yellow = draw; Red = away team win.

== See also ==
- 1941 Peruvian Primera División
