= 1940 Peruvian Primera División =

Peruvian Primera División
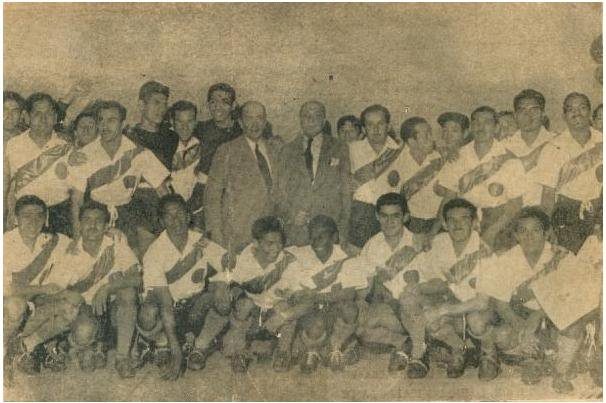
- Deportivo Municipal, champion
- Season: 1940
- Dates: 12 May 1940 – 8 September 1940
- Champions: Deportivo Municipal (2nd title)
- Runner up: Universitario
- Relegated: Ciclista Lima
- Matches: 56
- Goals: 201 (3.59 per match)
- Top goalscorer: Teodoro Fernández (15 goals)

The 1940 season of the Peruvian Primera División, the top category of Peruvian football, was played by 8 teams. The national champions were Deportivo Municipal.

From 1931 until 1942 the points system was W:3, D:2, L:1, walkover:0.

== Teams ==
=== Team changes ===
Promoted from 1939 Ligas Provinciales de Lima y Callao Promotion Playoff winner	Relegated from 1939 Primera División
▲ Alianza Lima (1st)	▼ Atlético Córdoba (8th)

=== Stadia and Locations ===
Team	City
Alianza Lima	La Victoria, Lima
Atlético Chalaco	Callao
Ciclista Lima	Cercado de Lima
Deportivo Municipal	Cercado de Lima
Sport Boys	Callao
Sporting Tabaco	Rímac, Lima
Sucre	La Victoria, Lima
Universitario	Cercado de Lima

== League table ==
=== Standings ===
Pos	Team	Pld	W	D	L	GF	GA	GD	Pts	Qualification or relegation
1	Deportivo Municipal (C)	14	8	2	4	29	21	+8	32	Champions
2	Universitario	14	6	4	4	29	19	+10	30	
3	Alianza Lima	14	6	4	4	23	14	+9	30	
4	Atlético Chalaco	14	6	3	5	23	28	−5	29	
5	Sport Boys	14	6	1	7	27	23	+4	27	
6	Sporting Tabaco	14	5	3	6	25	23	+2	27	
7	Sucre	14	6	0	8	22	27	−5	26	Liguilla de Promoción
8	Ciclista Lima	14	3	3	8	23	43	−20	23	Liguilla de Promoción

(C) Champions

== Results ==
Home \ Away	ALI	CHA	CIC	MUN	SBA	TAB	SUC	UNI
Alianza Lima		1–1	5–1	4–0	3–2	0–0	0–1	0–0
Atlético Chalaco	2–1		1–1	1–4	4–1	3–2	2–1	2–1
Ciclista Lima	2–2	4–0		1–1	3–5	1–4	6–4	1–5
Deportivo Municipal	2–1	4–1	4–0		2–2	3–2	1–2	2–1
Sport Boys	1–3	0–1	1–2	1–2		2–1	2–1	5–0
Sporting Tabaco	0–2	4–3	2–1	2–1	0–1		4–1	1–1
Sucre	0–1	3–1	2–0	3–2	0–2	2–1		1–2
Universitario	2–0	1–1	7–0	0–1	4–2	2–2	3–1	

Updated to match(es) played on 1940. Source: Diario El Comercio, La Prensa and Crónica.
Legend: Blue = home team win; Yellow = draw; Red = away team win.

== Liguilla de Promoción ==
=== Standings ===
Pos	Team	Pld	W	D	L	GF	GA	GD	Pts	Qualification or relegation	SUC	SAN	TEL	CIC
1	Sucre	3	3	0	0	16	2	+14	9			3–2	6–0	
2	Santiago Barranco	3	1	1	1	6	6	0	6	Relegation play-off				2–1
3	Telmo Carbajo (O)	3	1	1	1	5	9	−4	6	Relegation play-off		2–2		3–1
4	Ciclista Lima (R)	3	0	0	3	2	12	−10	3	1941 Segunda Regional de Lima y Callao	0–7			

Legend: Blue = home team win; Yellow = draw; Red = away team win.
(O) Play-off winners; (R) Relegated

=== Results ===
23 March 1941	Telmo Carbajo	3–1	Ciclista Lima	Estadio Nacional, Lima
14:30				Referee: Eduardo Lanatta

23 March 1941	Sucre	3–2	Santiago Barranco	Estadio Nacional, Lima
16:20				Referee: Pablo Tagle

30 March 1941	Santiago Barranco	2–1	Ciclista Lima	Estadio Nacional, Lima
14:20				Referee: Jesús Mora

30 March 1941	Sucre	6–0	Telmo Carbajo	Estadio Nacional, Lima
16:20				Referee: Humberto Stagnaro

6 April 1941	Ciclista Lima	0–7	Sucre	Estadio Nacional, Lima
14:20				Referee: Lizardo López Torres

6 April 1941	Telmo Carbajo	2–2	Santiago Barranco	Estadio Nacional, Lima
16:30				Referee: Juan Bulnes

=== Relegation play-off ===
Because Telmo Carbajo and Santiago Barranco tied with 6 points a relegation play-off on neutral ground will be played as the tournament rules specify.

13 April 1941	Telmo Carbajo	3–2	Santiago Barranco	Estadio Nacional, Lima
15:00	Ruiz 11'; Zuzunaga 47' 70'		Butrón 52' (o.g.); Aparicio 61'	Referee: Juan Bulnes

== See also ==
- 1940 Ligas Provinciales de Lima y Callao
