= 1948 Peruvian Segunda División =

Peruvian Segunda División
- Season: 1948
- Dates: 20 November 1948 – 20 February 1949
- Champions: Centro Iqueño
- Runner up: Santiago Barranco
- Matches: 42
- Goals: 162 (3.86 per match)

The 1948 Peruvian Segunda División, the second division of Peruvian football (soccer), was played by eight teams. The tournament winner, Centro Iqueño, was promoted to the 1949 Peruvian Primera División.

== Competition format ==
All teams faced each other in a double round-robin format, playing home and away matches. The team that accumulated the highest number of points at the end of the season was automatically crowned champion and promoted to the Peruvian Primera División.

== Teams ==
=== Team changes ===
Promoted from 1947 Liga Regional de Lima y Callao	Promoted to 1948 Primera División	Relegated to 1948 Liga Regional de Lima y Callao
▲ Defensor Arica (1st)	▲ Jorge Chávez (1st)	▼ Telmo Carbajo (8th)

=== Stadia and locations ===
Team	City
Association Chorrillos	Chorrillos, Lima
Atlético Lusitania	Cercado de Lima
Carlos Concha	Callao
Centro Iqueño	Cercado de Lima
Defensor Arica	Breña, Lima
Santiago Barranco	Barranco, Lima
Unión Callao	Callao

== League table ==
=== Standings ===
Pos	Team	Pld	W	D	L	GF	GA	GD	Pts	Qualification or relegation
1	Centro Iqueño (C)	12	8	3	1	31	20	+11	19	1949 Primera División
2	Santiago Barranco	12	6	4	2	24	18	+6	16	
3	Unión Callao	12	5	6	1	27	22	+5	16	
4	Atlético Lusitania	12	3	5	4	14	17	−3	11	
5	Defensor Arica	12	3	3	6	20	20	0	9	
6	Carlos Concha	12	2	4	6	22	24	−2	8	
7	Association Chorrillos	12	1	4	7	24	41	−17	6	

(C) Champions

== Results ==
Home \ Away	ACH	LUS	CON	CEN	ARI	SAN	UNI
Association Chorrillos		2–3	1–1	1–3	2–2	2–5	3–3
Atlético Lusitania	2–1		1–0	1–2	1–1	0–0	0–1
Carlos Concha	3–4	2–2		2–4	2–3	2–3	2–2
Centro Iqueño	7–2	0–0	2–4		3–2	2–0	2–2
Defensor Arica	2–0	5–2	0–1	1–3		0–1	1–2
Santiago Barranco	4–4	2–1	0–0	1–2	1–1		1–1
Unión Callao	5–2	1–1	4–3	3–3	2–1	1–3	

Updated to match(es) played on unknown. Source: Diario El Comercio, La Prensa and Crónica.
Legend: Blue = home team win; Yellow = draw; Red = away team win.

== See also ==
- 1948 Peruvian Primera División
