= Atlético Telmo Carbajo =

Peruvian football club

Telmo Carbajo
- Full name: Club Atlético Telmo Carbajo
- Founded: 16 November 1918
- Dissolved: 1976; 50 years ago
- Ground: Estadio Telmo Carbajo
- Capacity: 8,000
- League: Copa Perú
Home colours	Away colours

Telmo Carbajo was a Peruvian football club, playing in the city of Callao, Lima, Peru.

== History ==
Club Atlético Telmo Carbajo was founded in 1928 by Ricardo Hurtado, taking its name in honor of the Callao sportsman Telmo Carbajo. The club began competing in the Segunda División Provincial de Lima (equivalent to the fourth tier) in 1929, winning the Callao zone championship after a 4–1 victory over Callao F.B.C., and subsequently claiming the overall title by winning the interzonal playoff. In 1930, it secured promotion to the División Intermedia after winning its group in the Segunda División Provincial (renamed that year as the third tier). The following year, it finished third in its group in the 1931 Peruvian División Intermedia.

In 1932, the club became part of the newly created Liga Provincial del Callao, continuing to compete in the División Intermedia del Callao, and the following year it earned promotion to the Liga Provincial del Callao. In 1935, it finished as runner-up in that competition behind Atlético Chalaco, with both clubs invited to join the so-called “División de Honor,” which unified the Lima and Callao leagues. This tournament began with the 1937 Peruvian Primera División season (no competition was held in 1936 due to Peru’s participation in the 1936 Berlin Olympic Games), and in that same year the club was relegated back to the Liga Provincial del Callao.

Telmo Carbajo won the Liga Provincial del Callao in 1938 but failed to secure promotion to the 1939 Peruvian Primera División after losing to Atlético Córdoba. In 1940, it once again became Callao champion and qualified for the Promotion tournament (popularly known as the “Rueda Trágica”), alongside Santiago Barranco (Lima champion), Sucre, and Ciclista Lima (bottom clubs of the 1940 First Division), finishing second and achieving promotion.

In the 1941 Peruvian Primera División season, the club finished last alongside Atlético Chalaco, forcing both teams to compete again in the “Rueda Trágica” against the top two teams of the 1941 Segunda División Regional de Lima y Callao: Centro Iqueño and Santiago Barranco. However, after the tournament ended with Chalaco, Iqueño, and Carbajo tied in first place, the Peruvian Football Federation decided that all four clubs would participate in the 1942 Peruvian Primera División season.

Carbajo finished second-to-last in the 1942 Peruvian Primera División and was relegated. In 1943, the Peruvian Segunda División was established with four clubs: Telmo Carbajo, Santiago Barranco (both relegated from the 1942 Primera División), and Progresista Apurímac and Ciclista Lima (promoted from the 1942 Segunda División Regional). Carbajo won the 1943 Segunda División title but failed to gain promotion after losing both playoff matches (4–1 and 4–0) against Centro Iqueño, the bottom club of the 1943 Peruvian Primera División.

In 1947 Peruvian Segunda División, the club finished last after a 4–2 defeat to Jorge Chávez in the penultimate round, resulting in relegation. In the following years, it competed in the Liga Regional de Lima y Callao and, after its dissolution, in the Liga Provincial del Callao.

Telmo Carbajo won the Liga Provincial del Callao in 1960 and competed in a champions’ Triangular de Ascenso against Alianza Libertad de Lince (Lima champion) and Association Chorrillos (Balnearios champion). The latter won the playoff and secured promotion to the 1961 Peruvian Segunda División.

In 1963, the club was relegated to the Segunda División Provincial del Callao, where it competed until 1975. The following year, it did not participate in the competition, and since then it has not taken part in official tournaments.

== Statistics and results in First Division ==
=== League history ===
Season	Div.	Pos.	Pl.	W	D	L	GF	GA	P	Notes
1937	1st	8	9	3	2	4	10	15	15	8/10 Regular Season
1941	1st	8	14	2	4	8	14	34	22	8/8 Regular season
1942	1st	9	9	2	2	5	14	18	15	9/10 Regular Season

== Honours ==
=== Senior titles ===
Keys

- Record
- ^{(s)} Shared record

Type	Competition	Titles	Runner-up	Winning years	Runner-up years
National (League)	Segunda División	1	1	1943	1944
Regional (League)	Primera División Amateur del Callao	3	6	1938, 1940, 1960	1934, 1935, 1939, 1957, 1958, 1961
Regional (League)	Segunda División Amateur de Lima	2	—	1929 Zona del Callao, 1930 Segunda Serie	—
Regional (League)	Segunda División Amateur del Callao	—	1	—	1964

== Notable players ==
- (Peru) Arturo Paredes (1930–1932)
- (Peru) Lorenzo López (1932–1939, 1951)
- (Peru) Rufino Lecca (1939–1941)
- (Peru) Eugenio Arenaza (1940–1942)
- (Peru) Julio Ayllón (1941)
- (Peru) Rafael León (1941–1942)
- (Peru) Enrique Strat (1945)

== See also ==
- List of football clubs in Peru
- Peruvian football league system
