= 1939 Ligas Provinciales de Lima y Callao =

Ligas Provinciales de Lima y Callao
- Season: 1939
- Dates: 2 July 1939 – 31 March 1940
- Champions: Alianza Lima
- Relegated: Sportivo Uruguay; Miguel Grau
- Top goalscorer: Carlos Drago (8)

The 1939 Ligas Provinciales de Lima y Callao, the second division of Peruvian football (soccer), was played by 19 teams (11 from the Liga Provincial de Lima and eight from the Liga Provincial del Callao). The tournament winner, Alianza Lima was promoted to the 1940 Peruvian Primera División. From 1931 until 1942 the points system was W:3, D:2, L:1, walkover:0.

== Teams ==
=== Team changes ===
Relegated from 1938 Primera División	Promoted to 1939 Primera División	Promoted from 1938 División Intermedia (Lima)	Promoted from 1938 División Intermedia (Callao)	Relegated from 1938 Liga Provincial de Lima	Relegated from 1938 Liga Provincial del Callao
▼ Alianza Lima (8th) ▼ Progresista Apurímac (9th)	▲ Atlético Córdoba (1st)	▲ Juventud Perú (1st) ▲ Sportivo Uruguay (2nd)	▲ Scuola Deportiva Italia (1st)	▼ Atlético Peruano (10th) ▼ Sport Progreso (11th)	▼ Porteño (7th) ▼ Unión Buenos Aires (8th)

=== Stadia and Locations ===
Team	City
Alianza Lima	La Victoria, Lima
Atlético Lusitania	Barrios Altos, Lima
Centro Iqueño	Cercado de Lima
Independencia Miraflores	Miraflores, Lima
Jorge Chávez	Callao
Juventud Gloria	Cercado de Lima
Juventud Perú	Barrios Altos, Lima
Miguel Grau	Rímac, Lima
Progresista Apurímac	Callao
Santiago Barranco	Barranco, Lima
Scuola Deportiva Italia	Callao
Social San Carlos	Callao
Sportivo Melgar	Cercado de Lima
Sportivo Palermo	Callao
Sportivo Uruguay	Cercado de Lima
Telmo Carbajo	Callao
Unión Carbone	Barrios Altos, Lima
Unión Estrella	Callao
White Star	Callao

== Liga Provincial de Lima ==
=== Primeros Equipos ===
Pos	Team	Pld	W	D	L	GF	GA	GD	Pts
1	Alianza Lima	10	8	1	1	23	7	+16	27
2	Centro Iqueño	10	6	2	2	19	11	+8	24
3	Independencia Miraflores	10	5	1	4	24	16	+8	21
4	Santiago Barranco	10	4	3	3	10	9	+1	21
5	Juventud Gloria	10	4	2	4	13	15	−2	20
6	Atlético Lusitania	10	3	4	3	8	10	−2	20
7	Juventud Perú	10	3	2	5	11	14	−3	18
8	Sportivo Melgar	10	3	2	5	7	11	−4	18
9	Unión Carbone	10	2	4	4	5	10	−5	18
10	Sportivo Uruguay	10	3	2	5	11	18	−7	18
11	Miguel Grau	10	2	1	7	8	18	−10	15

==== Results ====
Teams play each other once, either home or away. The matches were played only in Lima.

Home \ Away	ALI	LUS	CEN	IND	GLO	JUV	GRA	SAN	MEL	URU	CAR
Alianza Lima				2–1			4–1	4–1	3–0	5–1	
Atlético Lusitania	0–1					2–1	1–0		2–0		
Centro Iqueño	2–0	1–1		3–2				1–0		1–1	
Independencia Miraflores		4–0				1–2			3–1		2–1
Juventud Gloria	0–2	0–0	0–5	2–2			2–0				3–0
Juventud Perú	1–2		2–3		3–1			0–0	0–0		2–0
Miguel Grau			4–2	0–4		3–0				0–2	
Santiago Barranco		1–1		3–0	1–2		0–0			1–0	1–0
Sportivo Melgar			0–1		1–0		2–0	1–2		2–0	0–0
Sportivo Uruguay		1–0		2–5	1–3	2–0					1–1
Unión Carbone	0–0	1–1	1–0				1–0				

Updated to match(es) played on unknown. Source: Diario El Comercio, La Prensa and Crónica.
Legend: Blue = home team win; Yellow = draw; Red = away team win.

=== Tabla Absoluta ===
Pos	Team	Pld	W	D	L	GF	GA	GD	Pts	Resv.	Total	Qualification or relegation
1	Alianza Lima	10	8	1	1	23	7	+16	27	3.75	30.75	Qualified to the Promotion Play-off
2	Centro Iqueño	10	6	2	2	19	11	+8	24	2.875	27.875	
3	Atlético Lusitania	10	3	4	3	8	10	−2	20	3.375	23.375	
4	Juventud Gloria	10	4	2	4	13	15	−2	20	3.375	23.375	
5	Independencia Miraflores	10	5	1	4	24	16	+8	21	2	23	
6	Santiago Barranco	10	4	3	3	10	9	+1	21	2	23	
7	Juventud Perú	10	3	2	5	11	14	−3	18	3.125	21.125	
8	Sportivo Melgar	10	3	2	5	7	11	−4	18	3	21	
9	Unión Carbone	10	2	4	4	5	10	−5	18	2.875	20.875	
10	Sportivo Uruguay	10	3	2	5	11	18	−7	18	2.125	20.125	1940 División Intermedia
11	Miguel Grau	10	2	1	7	8	18	−10	15	2.125	17.125	1940 División Intermedia

== Liga Provincial del Callao ==
=== Primeros Equipos ===
Pos	Team	Pld	W	D	L	GF	GA	GD	Pts
1	Jorge Chávez	7	3	4	0	10	6	+4	17
2	Telmo Carbajo	7	4	1	2	20	11	+9	16
3	Social San Carlos	7	3	3	1	16	10	+6	16
4	Sportivo Palermo	7	3	2	2	12	11	+1	15
5	White Star	7	3	1	3	15	19	−4	14
6	Progresista Apurímac	7	2	2	3	13	11	+2	13
7	Unión Estrella	7	1	1	5	9	17	−8	10
8	Scuola Deportiva Italia	7	1	1	5	12	22	−10	10

==== Results ====
Teams play each other once, either home or away. The matches were played only in Callao.

Home \ Away	JCH	PRO	SDI	CAR	PAL	TEL	UES	WHI
Jorge Chávez			3–1		1–0	2–2		1–1
Progresista Apurímac	1–1			0–1	1–1		5–1	
Scuola Deportiva Italia		3–4					0–3	4–3
Social San Carlos	1–1		2–1					7–2
Sportivo Palermo			2–2	1–0		1–5		3–1
Telmo Carbajo		1–0	5–1	3–3			3–1	
Unión Estrella	0–1			2–2	1–4			
White Star		3–2				3–1	2–1	

Updated to match(es) played on 1939. Source: Diario El Comercio, La Prensa and Crónica.
Legend: Blue = home team win; Yellow = draw; Red = away team win.

=== Tabla Absoluta ===
Pos	Team	Pld	W	D	L	GF	GA	GD	Pts	Resv.	Total	Qualification or relegation
1	Social San Carlos	7	3	3	1	16	10	+6	16	3.125	19.125	Qualified to the Promotion Play-off
2	Jorge Chávez	7	3	4	0	10	6	+4	17	1.75	18.75	
3	Telmo Carbajo	7	4	1	2	20	11	+9	16	1.875	17.875	
4	Sportivo Palermo	7	3	2	2	12	11	+1	15	2.5	17.5	
5	Progresista Apurímac	7	2	2	3	13	11	+2	13	3.5	16.5	
6	White Star	7	3	1	3	15	19	−4	14	1.25	15.25	
7	Unión Estrella	7	1	1	5	9	17	−8	10	0.875	10.875	
8	Scuola Deportiva Italia	7	1	1	5	12	22	−10	10	0.75	10.75	

== Promotion Play-off ==
31 March 1940

Alianza Lima	2–1	Social San Carlos
Juan Puente 14'; Máximo Urdanivia		Armando Agurto 43'

Estadio Nacional

== See also ==
- 1939 Peruvian Primera División
