= Dagoberto Lavalle =

Peruvian footballer (1925–1991)

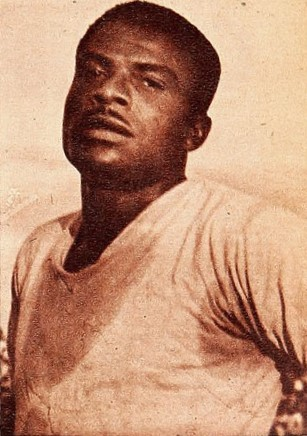

Personal information
- Full name: Dagoberto Lavalle Rojas
- Date of birth: 25 March 1925
- Date of death: 13 June 1991 (aged 66)
- Position: Midfielder

Senior career*
Years	Team	Apps	(Gls)
- Santiago Barranco
1947–1951	Sport Boys		
- Deportivo Municipal
- Alianza Lima
- Ciclista Lima

International career
1949–1956	Peru	11	(0)
- * Club domestic league appearances and goals

Dagoberto Lavalle Rojas (25 March 1925 – 13 June 1991) was a Peruvian professional footballer who played as midfielder.

== Playing career ==
=== Club career ===
Dagoberto Lavalle began his career at Santiago Barranco and won the Peruvian Second Division championship in 1945. Moving to Sport Boys in 1947, he won the first championship of the professional era in Peru with this club in 1951.

He continued his career first at Deportivo Municipal and then at Alianza Lima. He retired after a final stint with Ciclista Lima.

=== International career ===
Peruvian international Dagoberto Lavalle earned 11 caps for the national team between 1949 and 1956. He participated in two editions of the South American Championship, in 1949 in Brazil and then in 1955 in Chile, where Peru finished third each time. He also played in two editions of the Panamerican Championship, in 1952 in Chile and in 1956 in Mexico.

== Honours ==
Santiago Barranco

- Peruvian Segunda División: 1945

Sport Boys

- Peruvian Primera División: 1951

== Personal life ==
His son, Dagoberto Lavalle Fukushima (1951–2010), was also a footballer.
