= Eugenio Arenaza =

Peruvian footballer (1923–1983)

Personal information
- Full name: Eugenio Arenaza Douglas
- Date of birth: 1923
- Place of birth: Peru
- Date of death: 16 December 1983 (aged 59–60)
- Place of death: Mexico City, Mexico
- Height: 1.72 m (5 ft 8 in)
- Position: Goalkeeper

Senior career*
Years	Team	Apps	(Gls)
1941	Telmo Carbajo		
1942	Sporting Tabaco		
1943–1945	Alianza Lima		
1945–1946	ADO Orizaba		
1946–1950	Club León		
1950–1951	Club América	21	(0)
1951–1953	Club Oro		
1953–1954	C.D. Marte		
1954–1955	Deportivo Toluca		
1955–1958	CD Cautla		
- * Club domestic league appearances and goals

Eugenio Arenaza Douglas (1923–1983) was a Peruvian professional footballer who played as goalkeeper.

== Playing career ==
Nicknamed El Mono (the monkey), Eugenio Arenaza began his career at Telmo Carbajo of Callao in 1941. He joined Alianza Lima in 1943. Relegated to the bench following the emergence of Teódulo Legario as Alianza's goalkeeper, he emigrated to Mexico, where he would spend the majority of his career, becoming the first Peruvian goalkeeper to play there.

Initially playing for ADO de Orizaba between 1945 and 1946, he joined Club León in 1946. With León, he won two consecutive Mexican championships in 1948 and 1949. He also won the Mexican Cup in 1949, in addition to two Super Cups in 1947 and 1948.

He continued his career with various Mexican clubs—including Club América between 1950 and 1951—winning a third personal championship with CD Marte in 1954. He retired in 1958, having played 241 matches in the Mexican First Division (353 goals conceded)

Died in 1983, a street is named after him in Villas de San Juan, in the suburbs near León in Mexico (Eugenio El Mono Arenaza Street).

== Honours ==
Club León

- Mexican Primera División (2): 1947–48, 1948–49
- Copa México: 1948–49
- Campeón de Campeones (2): 1948, 1949

C.D. Marte

- Mexican Primera División: 1953–54
- Campeón de Campeones: 1954
