= Guillermo Delgado =

Peruvian footballer (1931-2014)

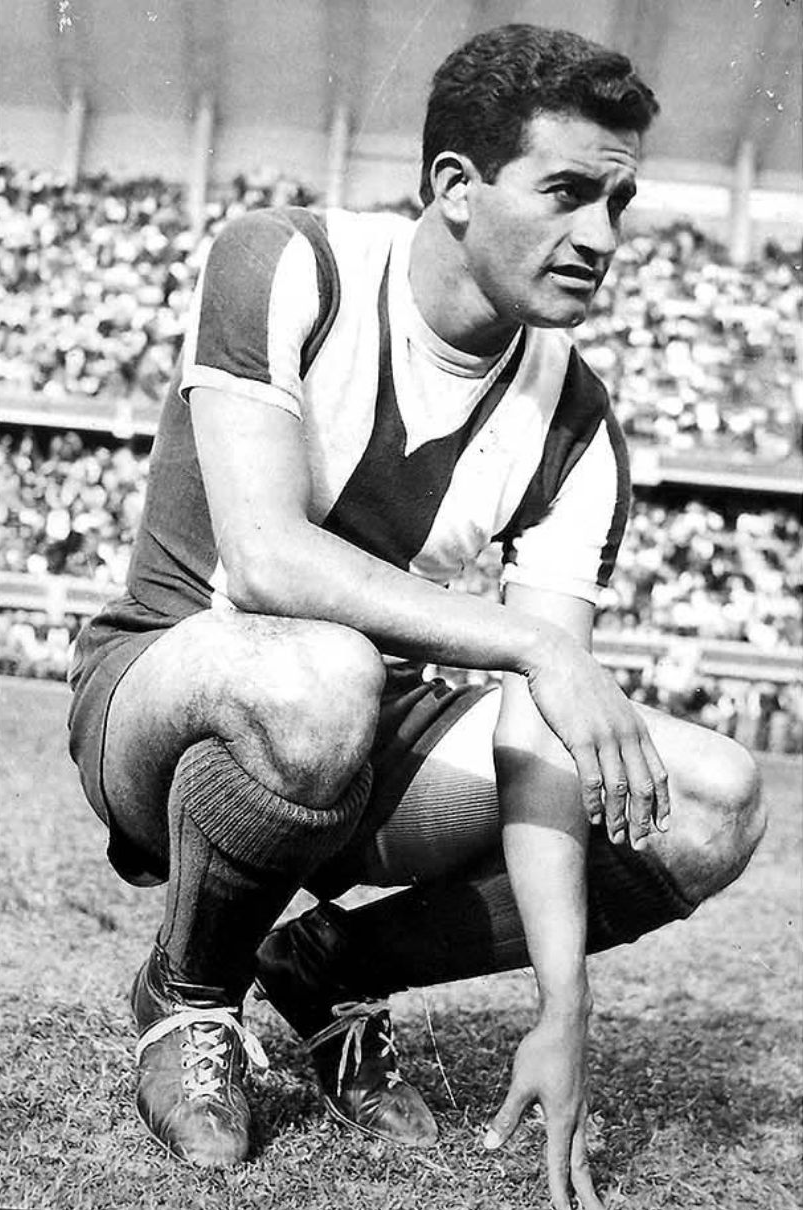

Personal information
- Full name: Guillermo Antonio Delgado Quinteros
- Date of birth: 11 February 1931
- Place of birth: Ica, Peru
- Date of death: 1 April 2014 (aged 83)
- Place of death: Cádiz, Spain
- Height: 1.80 m (5 ft 11 in)
- Position: Defender

Senior career*
| Years | Team | Apps | (Gls) |
| 1948–1949 | Centro Iqueño | | |
| 1950 | Huracán | | |
| 1951 | Centro Iqueño | | |
| 1952–1960 | Alianza Lima | | |
| 1961 | Deportivo Cali | | |
| 1961–1963 | Real Zaragoza | | |
| 1963–1965 | Cádiz | 12 | (0) |

International career
| 1952–1957 | Peru | | |

Managerial career
- 1971: Cádiz
- * Club domestic league appearances and goals

Guillermo Antonio Delgado Quinteros (11 February 1931 – 1 April 2014) was a Peruvian footballer who played at both professional and international levels as a defender.

== Career ==
Born in Ica, Delgado played in Peru, Colombia and Spain for Centro Iqueño, Huracán, Alianza Lima, Deportivo Cali, Real Zaragoza and Cádiz.

He was a member of the Peruvian national team between 1952 and 1957.

He was also manager of Cádiz in 1971.

== Later life and death ==
He died in Cádiz, Spain on 1 April 2014, at the age of 83.
