= 1941 Peruvian Primera División =

Peruvian Primera División
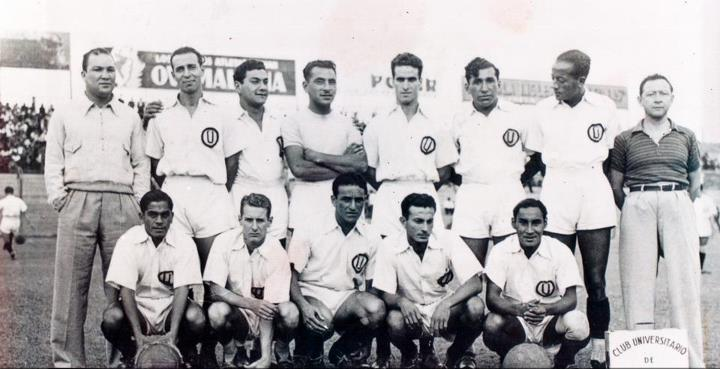
- Universitario, champion
- Season: 1941
- Dates: 24 August 1941 – 5 April 1942
- Champions: Universitario (4th title)
- Runner up: Deportivo Municipal
- Relegated: none
- Matches: 56
- Goals: 166 (2.96 per match)
- Top goalscorer: Jorge Cabrejos (13 goals)

The 1941 season of the Peruvian Primera División, the top category of Peruvian football, was played by 8 teams. The national champions were Universitario.

No team was relegated as First Division grew to 10 teams. From 1931 until 1942 the points system was W:3, D:2, L:1, walkover:0.

== Teams ==
=== Team changes ===
Promoted from
1940 Ligas Provinciales de Lima y Callao
Liguilla de Promoción
▲ Sucre (1st)
▲ Telmo Carbajo (2nd)

=== Stadia locations ===
Team	City	Mannager
Alianza Lima	La Victoria, Lima	(Peru) Alejandro Villanueva
Atlético Chalaco	Callao	(Peru) Justino Reyes
Deportivo Municipal	Cercado de Lima	
Sport Boys	Callao	(Peru) Raúl Chappell
Sporting Tabaco	Rímac, Lima	(Peru) Jeremías León
Sucre	La Victoria, Lima	(Peru) Alfonso Huapaya
Telmo Carbajo	Callao	
Universitario	Cercado de Lima	(Peru) Arturo Fernández

== League table ==
=== Standings ===
Pos	Team	Pld	W	D	L	GF	GA	GD	Pts	Qualification or relegation
1	Universitario (C)	14	7	6	1	26	13	+13	34	Champions
2	Deportivo Municipal	14	7	5	2	35	15	+20	33	
3	Alianza Lima	14	7	3	4	28	18	+10	31	
4	Sporting Tabaco	14	6	2	6	17	18	−1	28	
5	Sport Boys	14	5	4	5	24	26	−2	28	
6	Sucre	14	3	6	5	14	22	−8	26	
7	Atlético Chalaco	14	2	4	8	8	20	−12	22	Liguilla de Promoción
8	Telmo Carbajo	14	2	4	8	14	34	−20	22	Liguilla de Promoción

(C) Champions

== Results ==
Home \ Away	ALI	CHA	MUN	SBA	TAB	SUC	TEL	UNI
Alianza Lima		0–1	2–3	4–2	4–2	1–1	3–1	1–3
Atlético Chalaco	0–2		0–3	0–1	0–2	0–0	1–0	2–2
Deportivo Municipal	1–1	2–2		4–1	3–1	6–1	4–2	2–3
Sport Boys	1–5	3–1	2–2		1–2	2–1	2–3	3–3
Sporting Tabaco	0–1	2–1	1–0	0–1		1–1	4–1	1–3
Sucre	2–1	1–0	0–0	0–0	1–0		1–1	1–4
Telmo Carbajo	1–3	0–0	0–5	0–5	0–0	3–2		1–1
Universitario	0–0	1–0	0–0	0–0	0–1	3–1	3–0	

Updated to match(es) played on 1941. Source: Diario El Comercio, La Prensa and Crónica.
Legend: Blue = home team win; Yellow = draw; Red = away team win.

== Liguilla de Promoción ==
The teams place 7th and 8th in the 1941 Primera División (Atlético Chalaco and Telmo Carbajo) and the teams place 1st and 2nd in the 1941 Segunda División Regional de Lima y Callao (Santiago Barranco and Centro Iqueño) took part in the Liguilla de Promoción. No team was relegated as First Division grew to 10 teams.

=== Standings ===
Pos	Team	Pld	W	D	L	GF	GA	GD	Pts	Qualification or relegation	CEN	TEL	CHA	SAN
1	Centro Iqueño	3	1	2	0	6	3	+3	7	1942 Primera División		1–1	0–0	
2	Telmo Carbajo	3	1	2	0	5	2	+3	7	1942 Primera División			1–1	
3	Atlético Chalaco	3	1	2	0	3	2	+1	7	1942 Primera División				2–1
4	Santiago Barranco	3	0	0	3	3	10	−7	3	1942 Primera División	2–5	0–3		

Legend: Blue = home team win; Yellow = draw; Red = away team win.

=== Results ===
30 August 1942	Atlético Chalaco	2–1	Santiago Barranco	Estadio Nacional, Lima

30 August 1942	Centro Iqueño	1–1	Telmo Carbajo	Estadio Nacional, Lima

6 September 1942	Centro Iqueño	0–0	Atlético Chalaco	Estadio Nacional, Lima

6 September 1942	Santiago Barranco	0–3	Telmo Carbajo	Estadio Nacional, Lima

13 September 1942	Telmo Carbajo	1–1	Atlético Chalaco	Estadio Nacional, Lima

13 September 1942	Santiago Barranco	2–5	Centro Iqueño	Estadio Nacional, Lima

== See also ==
- 1941 Segunda División Regional de Lima y Callao
