= César Socarraz =

Peruvian footballer (1910–1984)

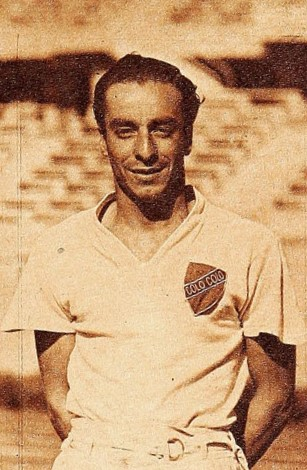
- Socarraz in 1950

Personal information
- Full name: César Augusto Socarraz
- Date of birth: 5 June 1910
- Place of birth: Lima, Peru
- Date of death: 1 January 1984 (aged 73)
- Place of death: Lima, Peru
- Height: 1.60 m (5 ft 3 in)
- Position: Forward

Senior career*
Years	Team	Apps	(Gls)
1930–1940	Universitario		
1941–1943	Colo-Colo	69	(33)
1944	Centro Iqueño		
1945	Deportivo Municipal		

International career
1941	Peru	6	(1)
- * Club domestic league appearances and goals

César Augusto Socarraz (5 June 1910 – 1 January 1984) was a Peruvian footballer who played for Universitario de Deportes in Peru, Colo-Colo in Chile, and the Peru national team in Copa Américas 1939 and 1941.

== Club career ==
Socarraz played for Universitario de Deportes from 1930 through 1940 and in Chile for Colo-Colo in the period 1941–1943. He scored 33 goals in 69 games for Colo Colo.

== International career ==
Socarraz was included in the Peru national team for the 1939 Copa América and 1941 Copa América.

== Honours ==
Universitario

- Peruvian Premier Division: 1934, 1939

Colo-Colo

- Chilean National League: 1941

Peru

- Copa América: 1939
