= 1952–53 Mexican Primera División season =

10th professional season of the top-flight football league in Mexico

Primera División de México
- Season: 1952–53
- Champions: Tampico (1st title)
- Relegated: La Piedad
- Matches: 132
- Goals: 397 (3.01 per match)

Statistics of the Primera División de México for the 1952–53 season.

== Overview ==
La Piedad was promoted to Primera División.

The season was contested by 12 teams, and Tampico won the championship.

La Piedad was relegated to Segunda División.

=== Teams ===
Location of the 1952-53 Primera División teams

Team	City	Stadium
América	Mexico City	Ciudad de los Deportes
Atlante	Mexico City	Ciudad de los Deportes
Atlas	Guadalajara, Jalisco	Parque Oblatos
Guadalajara	Guadalajara, Jalisco	Parque Oblatos
La Piedad	La Piedad, Michoacán	Juan N. López
León	León, Guanajuato	La Martinica
Marte	Mexico City	Ciudad de los Deportes
Necaxa	Mexico City	Ciudad de los Deportes
Oro	Guadalajara, Jalisco	Parque Oblatos
Puebla	Puebla, Puebla	Parque El Mirador
C.D. Tampico	Tampico, Tamaulipas	Tampico
Zacatepec	Zacatepec, Morelos	Campo del Ingenio

== League standings ==
Pos	Team	Pld	W	D	L	GF	GA	GD	Pts	Qualification or relegation
1	Tampico	22	14	6	2	45	28	+17	34	Champions
2	Zacatepec	22	10	8	4	38	26	+12	28	
3	León	22	12	3	7	35	29	+6	27	
4	Atlas	22	8	9	5	42	32	+10	25	
5	Guadalajara	22	10	3	9	41	32	+9	23	
6	Puebla	22	8	5	9	34	28	+6	21	
7	Marte	22	7	6	9	29	31	−2	20	
8	Atlante	22	6	7	9	29	33	−4	19	
9	Oro	22	7	5	10	30	41	−11	19	
10	Necaxa	22	6	6	10	33	35	−2	18	
11	América	22	5	6	11	23	40	−17	16	
12	La Piedad	22	6	2	14	18	42	−24	14	Relegated

Source: RSSSF

1952–53 winners

1st title

== Results ==
Home \ Away	AME	ATE	ATS	GDL	LAP	LEO	MAR	NEC	ORO	PUE	TAM	ZAC
América	—	1–1	1–3	3–2	0–1	0–2	1–1	1–2	1–3	1–0	0–1	0–2
Atlante	6–0	—	0–0	1–2	2–1	4–0	1–1	1–1	1–0	0–2	1–1	0–4
Atlas	1–1	2–1	—	2–2	3–0	1–2	2–4	5–3	4–0	1–3	3–3	2–2
Guadalajara	3–2	5–1	0–1	—	7–0	1–3	3–0	2–1	2–1	3–2	3–1	1–1
La Piedad	2–3	0–0	1–0	0–2	—	0–3	2–1	3–0	1–0	1–0	1–2	0–0
León	0–0	4–1	2–2	1–0	3–0	—	3–1	2–1	2–1	1–0	1–2	2–1
Marte	0–0	1–2	0–2	1–0	2–1	4–2	—	2–0	4–2	0–0	1–3	2–2
Necaxa	2–3	1–2	1–1	3–0	2–0	2–0	0–0	—	2–0	5–2	2–2	2–2
Oro	2–2	2–1	1–1	2–1	4–2	1–0	1–0	2–2	—	2–1	2–2	2–2
Puebla	1–2	1–0	3–3	3–0	4–1	1–1	0–2	2–1	3–0	—	3–0	1–1
Tampico	1–0	3–2	2–1	1–1	2–0	4–1	2–1	2–0	3–1	2–2	—	4–1
Zacatepec	4–1	1–1	0–2	2–1	2–1	2–0	2–1	1–0	4–1	1–0	1–2	—

Updated to match(es) played on 21 December 1952. Source: RSSSF
Legend: Blue = home team win; Yellow = draw; Red = away team win.
