= Santiago Barranco =

Peruvian football club

- Full name: Club Social Cultural Deportivo Santiago Barranco
- Nickname: Los piratas de la Raya Bolivia
- Founded: 20 September 1929; 96 years ago
- Chairman: Jaime Chihuán León
- League: Copa Perú
Home colours

Santiago Barranco is a Peruvian football club, playing in the city of Barranco, Lima, Peru.

The club was founded 20 September 1929 and plays in the Copa Perú, which is the third division of the Peruvian league.

== History ==
=== Foundation and Early Years ===
Founding Act of Club Sport Santiago Barranco:

In San José de Surco, on September 20, 1929, at four in the afternoon, active members, patrons, and players gathered and, by majority vote, agreed to change the club’s name to Club Sport Santiago Barranco, as most of its members and players resided in that district, representing the La Raya Bolivia neighborhood. After several hours of discussion, the following board of directors was elected:

President: Teodoro Paulino Ramírez
Vice President: Jesús Cabrera
Secretary: César Gonzales
Treasurer: Enrique Chevez
Auditor: Lupicino Zevallos
Board Member: Manuel Gamio
Board Member: César Sotelo
Delegate: Víctor Rosario
Delegate: Leonardo Reyes
Team Captain: Víctor Lavalle

Note: The club, originally known as Santiago de Surco, had existed for eight years before its name was changed to Club Sport Santiago Barranco.

During the 1930 and 1931 seasons, the club competed in the Tercera División Provincial de Lima (Balnearios zone). In 1932 and 1933, it played in the Segunda División Provincial de Lima. Between 1934 and 1936, it was part of the División Intermedia, before competing in the Liga Provincial de Lima from 1937 to 1939.

=== Spell in the First and Second Divisions ===
In 1940, Sport Santiago Barranco won the Liga Provincial de Lima championship and competed in the Liguilla de Promoción for the Primera División (First Division) alongside Telmo Carbajo (Liga Provincial del Callao champions), Sucre, and Ciclista Lima (bottom teams of the national top division), where it was eliminated in a playoff match for second place by Telmo Carbajo.

The following year, the Pirates of La Raya Bolivia won the 1941 Segunda División Regional de Lima y Callao title. They then competed in the promotion tournament for the 1942 Peruvian Primera División alongside runners-up Centro Iqueño and the bottom teams of the top division, Atlético Chalaco and Telmo Carbajo. Promotion was ultimately granted due to an expansion of places in the division by decision of the Peruvian Football Federation. As a result, in 1942 the club competed in the Peruvian Primera División, from which it was relegated in the same season alongside Telmo Carbajo.

In 1943, the club began competing in the Peruvian Segunda División. In 1945, it won the championship; however, there was no automatic promotion, and it was required to play a playoff against the bottom team of the Primera División, Sport Boys. It lost both matches and remained in the Peruvian Segunda División. In 1947 and 1948, the club finished as runner-up, behind Jorge Chávez and Centro Iqueño, respectively. In 1962, it was relegated after losing 2–0 to Unidad Vecinal on the final matchday, dropping to the Liga de los Balnearios del Sur.

=== In the Liga de los Balnearios del Sur ===
In 1963, the club won the championship of the now-defunct Liga de los Balnearios del Sur, but was eliminated in the promotion stage by ADO. In 1970, it once again secured the Balnearios league title, qualifying for the Interligas quadrangular for promotion to the Peruvian Segunda División alongside Sport Inca, Defensor San Borja, and Atlético Chalaco, the latter ultimately winning the tournament and returning to the 1971 Peruvian Segunda División.

Three years later, the club again finished first in the Balnearios league, earning the right to compete in the 1973 Octogonal de Ascenso for a place in the top flight. Their opponents included Sport Vitarte, Deportivo FABISA, Mariscal Sucre FBC, Ciclista Lima, Deportivo CITSA, Deportivo Helvético, and Atlético Barrio Frigorífico, the latter eventually winning the octagonal and securing promotion to the 1974 Torneo Descentralizado.

=== Liga Distrital de Barranco ===
In later years, Sport Santiago Barranco competed representing the Liga Distrital de Fútbol de Barranco, seeking promotion to the Second Division and even reaching the Lima and Callao Promotional Region, where it was eliminated in the semifinals. Its most recent major achievement in the Primera División Distrital came with a three-time championship, winning the titles in 1993, 1994, and 1995. However, in 1996 the club was relegated to the Segunda División Distrital. In 1997, it earned promotion back to the top tier after finishing unbeaten in its “B” group, remaining in the Primera División until 2006, when it was relegated. After three years, the club returned to the top division.

In 2009, the club won the Segunda División Distrital title; however, in 2010 it finished last and was relegated again to the same division.

In 2012, despite finishing fourth in the Segunda División Distrital, the club secured promotion back to the district’s top tier. During the 2015 season, one of the most difficult in its history, the club narrowly avoided relegation.

In 2017, under the presidency of Jaime Chihuán and managed by Álvaro Bonelli, the team finished third in its group in the Primera División Distrital, missing qualification for the Interligas de Lima by just one point.

In 2026, the club announced that it would not participate in the Primera División Distrital de Barranco (First Division) due to financial difficulties, resulting in its relegation to the Segunda División (Second Division).

== Statistics and results in First Division ==
=== League history ===
Season	Div.	Pos.	Pl.	W	D	L	GF	GA	P	Notes
1942	1st	10	9	0	1	8	10	31	10	10/10 Regular Season

== Honours ==
=== Senior titles ===
Keys

- Record
- ^{(s)} Shared record

Type	Competition	Titles	Runner-up	Winning years	Runner-up years
National (League)	Segunda División	1	2	1945	1947, 1948
Regional (League)	Liguilla de Promoción a Segunda División	—	1	—	1963
Regional (League)	Primera División Regional de Lima y Callao	1	—	1941	—
Regional (League)	Primera División Amateur de Lima	1	1	1940	1938
Regional (League)	Liga de los Balnearios del Sur	3	2	1963, 1970, 1973	1964, 1965
Regional (League)	Liga Distrital de Barranco	6	1	1977, 1980, 1988, 1994, 1995, 1996	1986
Regional (League)	División Intermedia	1	—	1936	—
Regional (League)	Segunda División Amateur de Lima	1	—	1933 Zona de Balnearios	—
Regional (League)	Segunda División Distrital de Barranco	3	—	1997, 2009, 2012	—

== Notable players ==
- (Peru) Julio Ayllón (1932 –1940)
- (Peru) Dagoberto Lavalle (1944–1945)
- (Peru) Rigoberto Felandro (1944–1946)
- (Peru) Fernando Cárpena (1949)
- (Peru) Guillermo Correa Bravo (1959)

== See also ==
- List of football clubs in Peru
- Peruvian football league system
