= Adolfo Donayre =

Peruvian footballer (1933–2011)

Personal information
- Date of birth: 10 August 1933
- Place of birth: Ica, Peru
- Date of death: 27 March 2011 (aged 77)

International career
Years	Team	Apps	(Gls)
1963	Peru	6	(0)

Adolfo Donayre (10 August 1933 – 27 March 2011) was a Peruvian footballer. He played in six matches for the Peru national football team in 1963. He was also part of Peru's squad for the 1963 South American Championship.
