= José del Castillo (footballer) =

Peruvian footballer (1943–2023)

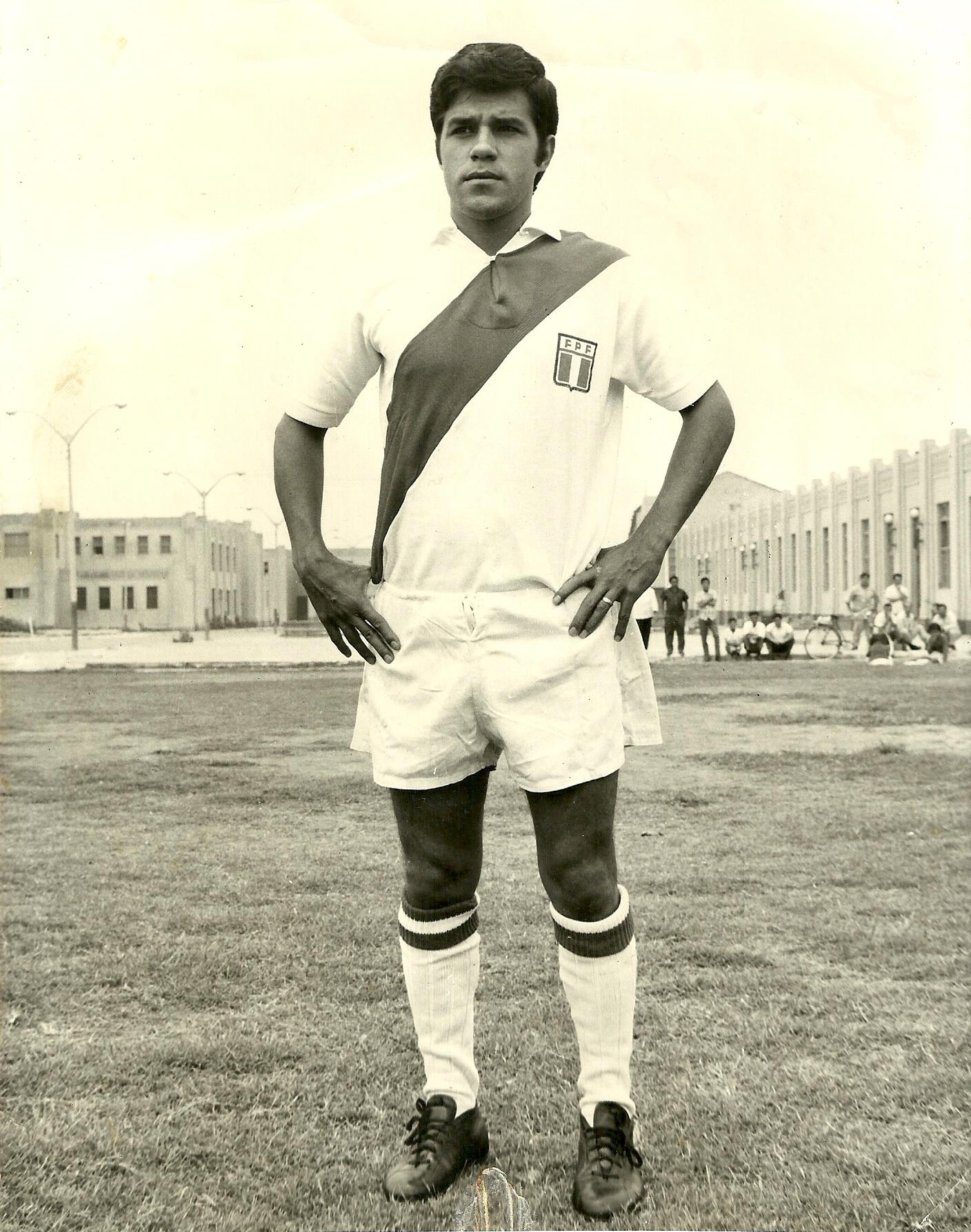
- Del Castillo in 1970

Personal information
- Full name: José Antonio del Castillo Burga
- Date of birth: 10 May 1943
- Place of birth: Peru
- Date of death: 4 February 2023 (aged 79)
- Position: Forward

Senior career*
Years	Team	Apps	(Gls)
- Sporting Cristal

International career
- Peru
- * Club domestic league appearances and goals

José Antonio del Castillo Burga (10 May 1943 – 4 February 2023) was a Peruvian football player and coach. A forward, he played for Peru in the 1970 FIFA World Cup. He also played for Sporting Cristal.

Del Castillo died on 4 February 2023, at the age of 79.
