= 1939 Peruvian Primera División =

Peruvian Primera División
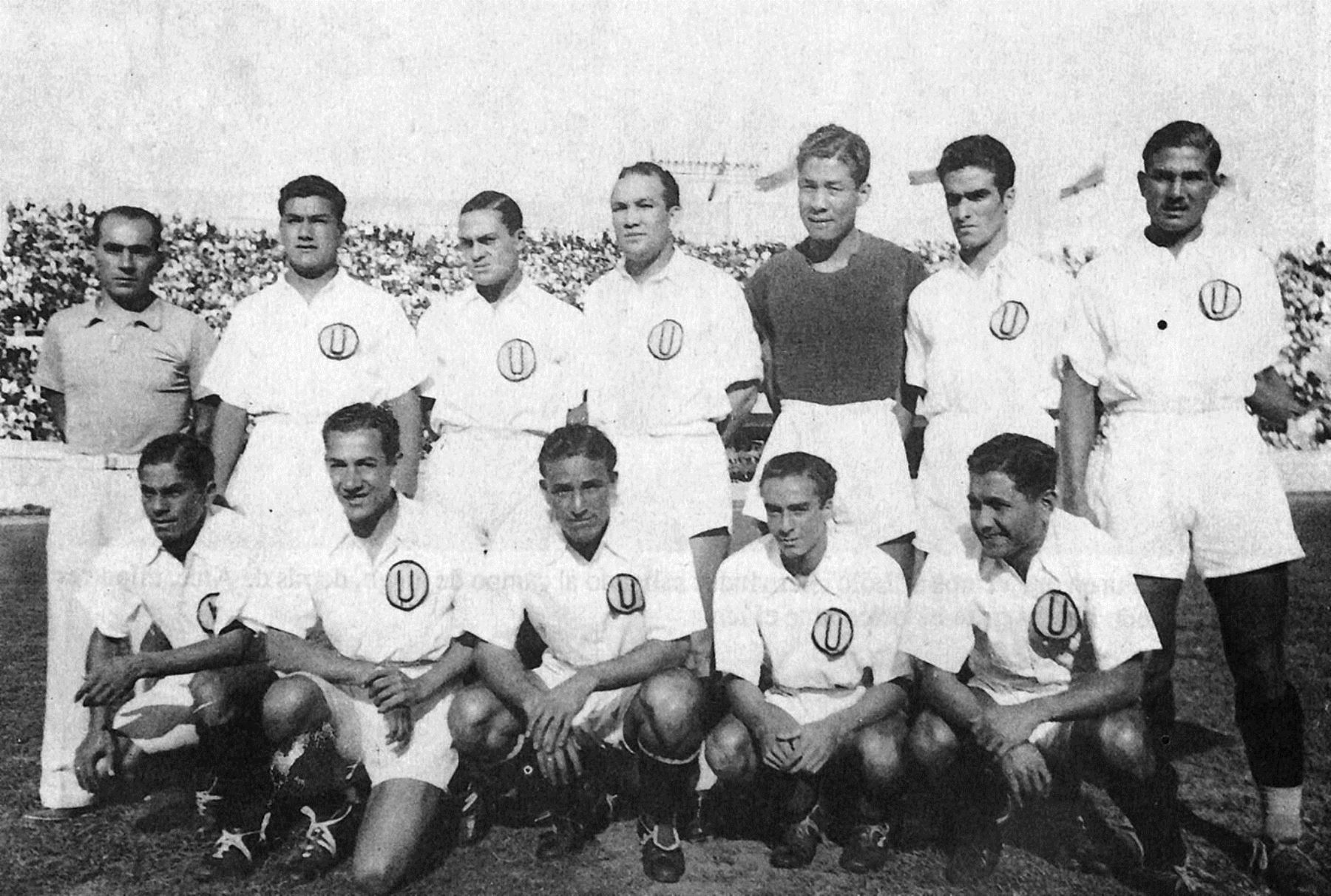
- Universitario, champion
- Season: 1939
- Dates: 20 August 1939 – 27 November 1939
- Champions: Universitario (3rd title)
- Runner up: Sucre
- Relegated: Atlético Córdoba
- Matches: 56
- Goals: 201 (3.59 per match)
- Top goalscorer: Teodoro Fernández (15 goals)

The 1939 season of the Peruvian Primera División, the top category of Peruvian football, was played by 8 teams. The national champions were Universitario.

From 1931 until 1942 the points system was W:3, D:2, L:1, walkover:0.

== Teams ==
=== Team changes ===
| Promoted from 1938 Ligas Provinciales de Lima y Callao Promotion Playoff winner | Relegated from 1938 Primera División |
|---|---|
| ▲ Atlético Córdoba (1st) | ▼ Alianza Lima (8th) ▼ Progresista Apurímac (9th) |

=== Stadia and Locations ===
| Team | City |
|---|---|
| Atlético Chalaco | Callao |
| Atlético Córdoba | Barrios Altos |
| Ciclista Lima | Cercado de Lima |
| Deportivo Municipal | Cercado de Lima |
| Sport Boys | Callao |
| Sporting Tabaco | Rímac, Lima |
| Sucre | La Victoria, Lima |
| Universitario | Cercado de Lima |

== League table ==
=== Standings ===
| Pos | Team | Pld | W | D | L | GF | GA | GD | Pts | Qualification or relegation |
|---|---|---|---|---|---|---|---|---|---|---|
| 1 | Universitario (C) | 14 | 9 | 3 | 2 | 32 | 14 | +18 | 35 | Champions |
| 2 | Sucre | 14 | 6 | 6 | 2 | 24 | 21 | +3 | 32 | |
| 3 | Deportivo Municipal | 14 | 7 | 3 | 4 | 32 | 22 | +10 | 31 | |
| 4 | Sporting Tabaco | 14 | 5 | 4 | 5 | 27 | 26 | +1 | 28 | |
| 5 | Ciclista Lima | 14 | 6 | 2 | 6 | 21 | 24 | −3 | 28 | |
| 6 | Atlético Chalaco | 14 | 4 | 3 | 7 | 24 | 25 | −1 | 25 | |
| 7 | Sport Boys | 14 | 3 | 5 | 6 | 21 | 26 | −5 | 25 | |
| 8 | Atlético Córdoba (R) | 14 | 2 | 2 | 10 | 20 | 43 | −23 | 20 | 1940 Liga Provincial de Lima |

(C) Champions; (R) Relegated

== Results ==
| Home \ Away | CHA | COR | CIC | MUN | SBA | TAB | SUC | UNI |
|---|---|---|---|---|---|---|---|---|
| Atlético Chalaco | | 1–0 | 0–1 | 4–1 | 2–2 | 0–2 | 1–3 | 0–1 |
| Atlético Córdoba | 1–6 | | 1–2 | 3–5 | 2–0 | 1–1 | 0–0 | 1–7 |
| Ciclista Lima | 6–2 | 1–2 | | 1–2 | 1–1 | 2–6 | 0–1 | 2–1 |
| Deportivo Municipal | 1–1 | 5–2 | 5–0 | | 3–2 | 0–1 | 3–0 | 2–0 |
| Sport Boys | 2–1 | 4–3 | 0–1 | 1–1 | | 3–0 | 1–1 | 0–2 |
| Sporting Tabaco | 1–3 | 4–2 | 1–3 | 2–2 | 2–0 | | 1–1 | 3–5 |
| Sucre | 3–3 | 3–2 | 2–1 | 3–1 | 4–2 | 2–2 | | 1–1 |
| Universitario | 1–0 | 4–0 | 0–0 | 2–1 | 3–3 | 2–1 | 3–0 | |

Updated to match(es) played on 1939. Source: Diario El Comercio, La Prensa and Crónica.
Legend: Blue = home team win; Yellow = draw; Red = away team win.

== See also ==
- 1939 Ligas Provinciales de Lima y Callao
