= Mariscal Sucre =

Peruvian football club

- Full name: Mariscal Sucre de Deportes
- Nickname: Los Dinamiteros
- Founded: September 1, 1925; 100 years ago
- Ground: Estadio Municipal de San Isidro
- Capacity: 1,000
- League: Liga Distrital de La Victoria
Home colours	Away colours

Club Mariscal Sucre de Deportes, commonly known as Mariscal Sucre, is a Peruvian football club, located in the city of La Victoria, Lima. The club was founded with the name of Sucre FC and was promoted to Peruvian Primera División in 1933, later was renamed Mariscal Sucre de Deportes in 1951. The club participates in the Liga Distrital de La Victoria, the 7th tier of the Peruvian football league system.

== History ==
Mariscal Sucre was founded on 1 September, 1925 as Sucre FC.

The club won the national tournament in 1944 and 1953. In 1951, the club changed its name to Mariscal Sucre de Deportes.

In the 1968 Torneo Descentralizado, Mariscal Sucre was relegated when Centro Iqueño defeated them in a relegation playoff, and it was their last appearance in the Peruvian Primera Division.

After the disappearance of the Peruvian Segunda División in 1973, the club played in the Liga Mayor de Fútbol de Lima in 1974 but did not get promotion to the Peruvian Primera División. The following year, after being relegated again and in search of resources to survive, the club decided to merge with Deportivo Epsep (a team of the Empresa Estatal de Servicios Pesqueros) and move to the Liga Distrital de San Isidro, in which, after being relegated the club did not show up to play in 1977, with which the club was disaffiliated and consummated his disappearance.

== Club name change ==
Season	Club name
1925–1950	Sucre FC
1951–1976	Mariscal Sucre de Deportes
2023–present	C.D. Mariscal Sucre Sport

== Honours ==
=== Senior titles ===
Keys

- Record
- ^{(s)} Shared record

Type	Competition	Titles	Runner-up	Winning years	Runner-up years
National (League)	Primera División	2	2	1944, 1953	1939, 1949
National (League)	Segunda División	3	1	1959, 1962, 1965	1969
Half-year / Short tournament (League)	Campeonato de Apertura (ANA)	1	1	1952	1945
Regional (League)	Primera División Amateur de Lima	1	—	1973 Serie B	—
Regional (League)	Liga Distrital de La Victoria	1	—	2024	—
Regional (League)	Liga Distrital de San Isidro	—	1	—	1975
Regional (League)	División Intermedia	2	—	1931, 1932	—
Regional (League)	Segunda División Amateur de Lima	2	—	1929 Zona de La Victoria, 1930 Primera Serie	—
Regional (League)	Tercera División Amateur de Lima	1	—	1927 AD Barrios Altos	—

=== Youth ===
Type	Competition	Titles	Runner-up	Winning years	Runner-up years
National (League)	Torneo Equipos de Reserva	1	—	1949	—

== Statistics and results in First Division ==
=== League history ===
Season	Div.	Pos.	Pl.	W	D	L	GF	GA	P	Notes
1933	1st	4	9	4	2	3	21	15	22.25	4/10 Regular season
1934	1st	3	8	5	1	2	16	10	22.75	3/9 Regular season
1935	1st	5	2	0	0	2	1	7	2	5/5 Regular season
1937	1st	6	9	4	0	5	21	20	17	6/10 Regular season
1938	1st	8	8	3	0	5	16	22	14	8/9 Regular season
1939	1st	2	14	6	6	2	24	21	32	2/8 Regular season
1940	1st	7	14	6	0	8	22	27	26	7/8 Regular season
1941	1st	6	14	3	6	5	14	22	26	6/8 Regular season
1942	1st	4	9	5	2	2	13	10	21	4/10 Regular season
1943	1st	7	14	2	7	5	22	25	11	7/8 Regular season
1944	1st	1	14	10	1	3	40	25	21	1/8 Regular season
1945	1st	5	14	3	7	4	22	23	13	5/8 Regular season
1946	1st	4	21	7	9	5	35	36	23	4/8 Regular season
1947	1st	6	21	8	3	10	28	43	19	6/8 Regular season
1948	1st	7	24	7	6	11	46	53	20	7/9 Regular season
1949	1st	2	21	10	4	7	47	43	24	2/8 Regular season
1950	1st	9	18	4	4	10	36	48	12	9/10 Regular season
1951	1st	3	18	9	2	7	45	40	20	3/10 Regular season
1952	1st	6	18	8	2	8	36	37	12	6/10 Regular season
1953	1st	1	18	8	5	5	27	23	21	1/10 Regular season
1954	1st	9	18	5	2	11	26	33	12	9/10 Regular season
1955	1st	8	18	5	5	8	17	24	15	8/10 Regular season
1956	1st	7	18	4	6	8	22	26	14	7/10 Regular season
1957	1st	9	22	5	9	8	27	36	19	9/10 Regular season
1958	1st	10	22	5	5	12	23	39	15	10/10 Regular season
1960	1st	8	18	5	4	9	36	40	14	8/10 Regular season
1961	1st	10	18	4	3	11	23	38	11	10/10 Regular season
1963	1st	10	18	5	1	12	21	41	11	10/10 Regular season
1966	1st	10	26	7	7	12	30	40	21	10/14 Regular season
1967	1st	12	26	5	9	12	22	40	19	12/14 Regular season
1968	1st	14	26	4	6	16	24	54	14	14/14 Regular season

== Notable managers ==
- (Peru) Alfonso Huapaya (1944)
- (Peru) Carlos Iturrizaga (1953)

== Notable players ==
- (Peru) Juan Flores (1937)
- (Peru) Walter Ormeño (1951–1952)
- (Argentina) Waldino Aguirre (1951–1952)
- (Peru) Rodolfo Bazán (1957–1958)
- (Peru) Jesus Goyzueta (1967–1968)
