= Ligas Provinciales de Lima y Callao (1926–1975) =

- Founded: 1926 (Lima); 1932 (Callao); 1956 (Balnearios)
- Folded: 1974 (Lima); 1974 (Callao); 1974 (Balnearios)
- Country: Peru
- Confederation: CONMEBOL
- Level on pyramid: 1 (1926—1935); 2 (1936—1940); 3 (1951—1974)
- Promotion to: Primera División; Segunda División

The Ligas Provinciales de Lima y Callao, the second division of Peruvian football (soccer) in 1935 until 1940. The tournament was played on a home-and-away round-robin basis.

This championship remained in force until 1940. Initially the Liga Provincial de Lima played the role of the first division. However, the 1936 season, it became the lower category of the honor division. In that same year, the Liga Provincial de Lima merged with the Liga Provincial del Callao to form the Primera División Unificada de Lima y Callao. For the following years, Liga Provincial de Lima competed together with Liga Provincial del Callao to obtain promotion to the division of honor. Finally, the championship disappeared when the Liga Regional de Lima y Callao was formed in 1941.

For the years 1938 and 1939, the champions of each provincial league competed in a defining match for promotion.

The championship disappeared in 1941, after the creation of the Liga Regional de Lima y Callao. However, when the Liga Regional disappeared in 1951, the Liga Provincial de Lima, Liga Provincial del Callao and Liga de los Balnearios del Sur returned until 1970s.

From 1954 to 1973, the champions of each league qualified to the Liguilla de Ascenso a Segunda División.

== Structure ==
Level	Liga Provincial de Lima	Liga Provincial del Callao	Liga de Balnearios del Sur
1	Primera División	Primera División	Primera División
2	División Intermedia	División Intermedia	Segunda División
3	Segunda División	Segunda División	Tercera División
4	Tercera División	Tercera División	—

== Liga Provincial de Lima ==
=== Primera División ===
Ed.	Season	Champion	Runner-up
1	1926	Sport Progreso	Sport Alianza
2	1927	Alianza Lima	Unión Buenos Aires
3	1928	Alianza Lima	Federación Universitaria
4	1929	Federación Universitaria	Circolo Sportivo Italiano
5	1930	Atlético Chalaco	Alianza Lima
6	1931	Alianza Lima	Sporting Tabaco
7	1932	Alianza Lima	Federación Universitaria
8	1933	Alianza Lima	Universitario
9	1934	Universitario	Alianza Lima
10	1935 Primera A	Sport Boys	Alianza Lima
As Second Division tournament
11	1936 Unificada	Deportivo Municipal	Sportivo Melgar
12	1937	Ciclista Lima	Sport Progreso
13	1938	Atlético Córdoba	Centro Iqueño
14	1939	Alianza Lima	Centro Iqueño
15	1940	Santiago Barranco	Juventud Gloria
–	1941–1950	The Liga Regional de Lima y Callao was played.	
As Third Division tournament
16	1951	Defensor Lima	Miguel Grau
17	1952	Unión América	Combinado Rímac
18	1953	Unión América	Juventud Soledad
19	1954	Unión América	Mariscal Castilla
20	1955	Mariscal Castilla	Juventud White Star
21	1956	Mariscal Castilla	Atlético Peruano
22	1957	Defensor Lima	Unión Lazo
23	1958	Atlético Lusitania	Mariano Necochea
24	1959	Combinado Rímac	Alianza Libertad
25	1960	Alianza Libertad	Estudiantes San Roberto
26	1961	Estudiantes San Roberto	Sport Inca
27	1962	Atlético Lusitania	Estudiantes San Roberto
28	1963	Annulled tournament^{[B]}	
29	1964	Atlético Banfield	Mariscal Castilla
30	1965	Atlético Banfield	Independiente Sacachispas
31	1966	Independiente Sacachispas	Mariscal Castilla
32	1967	Estudiantes San Roberto	Deportivo Loreto
33	1968	Centro Chupaca	
34	1969	Estudiantes San Roberto	
35	1970	Sport Inca	
36	1971	CITSA	Seguro Social
37	1972	CITSA	Combinado Rímac
38	1973 Serie A	Ciclista Lima	Porvenir Buenos Aires
38	1973 Serie B	Mariscal Sucre	Centro Iqueño
39	1974 Serie A	Estudiantes San Roberto	Compañía Peruana de Teléfonos
39	1974 Serie B	CITSA	Combinado Rímac
Defunct Tournament (See: Liga Distrital de Cercado de Lima)

==== Footnotes ====
B. The participating clubs were in disagreement with the decision of the Peruvian Football Federation to include the champion club of the 1963 Liga Distrital de San Isidro in the 1963 Liguilla de Promoción for the 1964 Peruvian Segunda División. As a result of this situation, the Peruvian Football Federation decided to annul the 1963 Liga Provincial de Lima tournament.

=== Primera B ===
Ed.	Season	Champion	Runner-up
As Second Division tournament
1	1929 Primera B	Lawn Tennis de la Exposición	Juventud Perú
2	1935 Primera B	Sporting Tabaco	Sport Progreso
Defunct Tournament

=== División Intermedia ===
Ed.	Season	Champion	Runner-up
1	1926	Association Alianza	Unión Santa Catalina
2	1927	No champion crowned.^{[A]}	
3	1928	Sporting Tabaco	Unión Estrella
As Third Division tournament
4	1929	Sportivo Uruguay	Intelectual Raymondi
As Second Division tournament
5	1930	Alianza Frigorífico	Alianza Cóndor
6	1931	Sucre	Sport Progreso
7	1932	Sucre	Sport Boys
8	1933	Unión Carbone	Sportivo Melgar
9	1934	Sport Progreso	Sportivo Melgar
As Third Division tournament
10	1935	Atlético Cordoba	Deportivo Municipal
11	1936	Alianza Cóndor	Atlético Peruano
12	1937	Atlético Lusitania	Juventud Gloria
13	1938	Juventud Perú	Sportivo Uruguay
14	1939	Porvenir Miraflores	Alianza Libertad
15	1940	Miguel Grau	Alianza Pino
Defunct Tournament

==== Footnotes ====
A. At the end of the season, the 10 best-placed teams were directly promoted to 1928 Primera División. These teams were Sportivo Unión, Alianza Chorrillos, Santa Catalina, Lawn Tennis, Alberto Secada, Jorge Washington, Alianza Callao, José Olaya, Jorge Chávez (C) and Unión FBC.

=== Segunda División ===
Ed.	Season		Champion	Runner-up
1	1926	Asociación Amateur	Sport Magdalena	Unión Chiclayo
1	1926	A.D. Barrios Altos	Juventud Perú	Atlético Lusitania
1	1926	Liga Chalaca	Alberto Secada	Alianza Callao
1	1926	Liga de Balnearios	Porvenir Miraflores	José Olaya Chorrillos
2	1927	Asociación Amateur	Juventud Alianza Lima	Juventud Soledad
2	1927	Liga Peruana N°2	Unión Carbone	Sporting Tabaco
2	1927	A.D. Barrios Altos	Racing FBC	Intelectual Raymondi
2	1927	Liga Chalaca	Sportivo Inca	Atlético Buenos Aires
2	1927	Liga de Balnearios	Juventud Chorrillos	Buenos Aires Chorrillos
3	1928	Asociación Amateur	Sportivo Uruguay	Juventud Nepeña
3	1928	Liga Peruana N°1	Mauricio Labrousse	Sport Cabana
3	1928	A.D. Rímac	Santa Rosa	Diego de Almagro
3	1928	Liga Chalaca	Sporting Bellavista	Porteño
3	1928	Liga de Balnearios	Asociación Chorrillos	Alfonso Ugarte Barranco
4	1929	Zona de La Victoria	Sucre	Circolo Sportivo Manzanilla
4	1929	Zona del Rímac	Atlético Espinar	Octavio Espinosa
4	1929	Zona del Callao	Telmo Carbajo	Callao FBC
4	1929	Zona de Lima	Juventud Soledad	Atlético Córdoba
5	1930	Primera Serie	Sucre	Juventud Soledad
5	1930	Segunda Serie	Telmo Carbajo	Rada y Gamio
6	1931	Primera Serie	Sport Boys	Porteño
6	1931	Segunda Serie	Sport Huáscar	Deportivo Obrero
7	1932	Zona Este	Unión América	Sportivo Melgar
7	1932	Zona Oeste	Juventud Gloria	América Callao
7	1932	Zona del Rímac	Peruvian Boys	Atlético Peruano
7	1932	Zona de Balnearios	Porvenir Miraflores	Santiago de Surco
8	1933	Zona Este	Atlético Lusitania	Juventud Nepeña
8	1933	Zona Oeste	Atlético Córdoba	Atlético Santa Rosa
8	1933	Zona del Rímac	Atlético Peruano	Alianza Limoncillo
8	1933	Zona de Balnearios	Santiago Barranco	Juventud Barranco
9	1934	Zona Este	Asociación Deportiva Tarapacá	Juventud White Star
9	1934	Zona Oeste	Sport San Jacinto	Mauricio Labrousse
9	1934	Zona del Rímac	Alianza Limoncillo	KDT Nacional
9	1934	Zona de Balnearios	Independencia Miraflores	Alianza Miraflores
10	1935	Zona Este	Sport José Gálvez	Eleven Boys
10	1935	Zona Oeste	Alianza San Martín	Nueve de Diciembre
10	1935	Zona del Rímac	Peruvian Boys	Roberto Acevedo
10	1935	Zona de Balnearios	Estudiantes Chorrillos	Juventud Barranco
11	1936	Zona Este	Alianza Risso	Juventud White Star
11	1936	Zona Oeste	Juventud Perú	Atlético Santa Rosa
11	1936	Zona del Rímac	Juventud Barranco	Nacional FBC
11	1936	Zona de Balnearios	Agricultor de Surco	Ciclista Alianza Miraflores
12	1937	Zona Este	Atlético Libertad	Once Amigos Lobatón
12	1937	Zona Oeste	Departamento de Lambayeque	Defensor Lima
12	1937	Zona del Rímac	Asociación Rímac	Juventud Soledad
12	1937	Zona de Balnearios	Atlético Miraflores	Fraternal Barranco
13	1938	Zona Este	Sport José Gálvez	Eleven Boys
13	1938	Zona Oeste	Defensor Lima	Unión Porvenir
13	1938	Zona del Rímac	Diego de Almagro	Sport Arica Infantas
13	1938	Zona de Balnearios	Alianza Chorrillos	Fraternal Barranco
14	1939	Zona Este	Eleven Boys	Coronel Leon Velarde
14	1939	Zona Oeste	Unión Porvenir	Atlético Ucayali
14	1939	Zona del Rímac	Alianza Pino	Peruvian Boys
14	1939	Zona de Balnearios	Sport Almagro	Huracán Barranco
15	1940	Serie A	Defensor Guido	Juventud White Star
15	1940	Serie B	Defensor Arica	Coronel León Velarde
15	1940	Serie C	Huracán Barranco	Association Chorrillos
–	1941–1950	The Liga Regional de Lima y Callao was played.		
16	1951	Serie A	Atlético Peruano	
16	1951	Serie B	Unión América	
17	1952	Serie A	Águila Negra	
17	1952	Serie B	Sport Huáscar	
18	1953	Serie A	Mariscal Castilla	Alianza Pino
18	1953	Serie B	Alianza Libertad	Sport Santa Beatriz
19	1954		Juventud White Star	
20	1955		Unión Lazo	
21	1956		Alianza Tarapacá	Alejandro Villanueva
22	1957	Serie A	Sport Lince	Sport Everton
22	1957	Serie B	Mariano Necochea	Atlético Banfield
23	1958	Serie A	Atlético Banfield	
23	1958	Serie B	Roberto Acevedo	
24	1959	Serie A	Sport José Gálvez	Audax FBC
24	1959	Serie B	Unión Carbone	Alejandro Manchego
25	1960	Serie A	Alejandro Manchego	
25	1960	Serie B	Alianza Amazonas	
26	1961	Serie A	Estrella Verde	Alianza Tarapacá
26	1961	Serie B	Alejandro Manchego	Audax FBC
27	1962			
28	1963			
29	1964			
30	1965			
31	1966			
32	1967			
33	1968			
34	1969			
35	1970			
36	1971			
37	1972			
38	1973			
39	1974			
Defunct Tournament

=== Tercera División ===
Ed.	Season		Champion	Runner-up
1	1926	Liga Peruana N.º 1	Sportivo Lavarello	Atlético Buenos Aires
1	1926	Asociación Amateur	Atlético Ucayali	Juventud Ormeño
1	1926	Liga Chalaca N.º 1	Federico Fernandini	Inca Callao
1	1926	Liga Chalaca N.º 2	Unión Estrella	Independencia Callao
1	1926	A.D. Rímac	Combinado Rímac	Peruvian Boys
1	1926	A.D. Barrios Altos	Juventud Soledad	Sportivo Melgar
1	1926	Liga de Balnearios	Unión Buenos Aires	Jorge Chávez
2	1927	Asoc. Amateur N°1	Juventud Nepeña	
2	1927	Asoc. Amateur N°2	Strong Boys Lima	
2	1927	A.D. Barrios Altos	Sucre	
2	1927	Liga Chalaca N°1	Alianza Bellavista	
2	1927	Liga Chalaca N°2	Porteño	
2	1927	Liga de Lima N°1	Lima FBC	
2	1927	Liga de Lima N°2	Alianza San Martín	
2	1927	Liga de Rímac	Asociación Bolívar Rímac	
2	1927	Liga de Balnearios	Once Amigos Barranco	
3	1928	A.D. Barrios Altos	Unión América	
3	1928	Liga Chalaca 1	Sport Boys	
3	1928	Liga Chalaca 2	Telmo Carbajo	
3	1928	Liga de Lima 1	Ricardo Treneman	
3	1928	Liga de Lima 2	Juventud Sandino	
3	1928	Liga de Lima 3	Alianza Huancavelica	
3	1928	Liga de Lima 4	Simón Maggiolo	
3	1928	Liga de Rímac	Asociación Deportiva Tarapacá	
3	1928	Liga de Balnearios	Sport Juventud Miraflores	
–	1929	No tournament		
4	1930	Zona de Lima 1	Alianza San Martín	Juventud Sporting
4	1930	Zona de Lima 2	Independiente Chosica	Sportivo Melgar
4	1930	Zona de Lima 3	American Star	Mauricio Labrousse
4	1930	Zona de Lima 4	Nueve de Diciembre	Sport Victoria
4	1930	Zona del Rímac	Alianza Marañón	Ricardo Palma
4	1930	Zona del Callao	Sport Boys	Alianza Tucumán
4	1930	Zona de Balnearios 1	Juventud Chorrillos	Independiente Miraflores
4	1930	Zona de Balnearios 2	Bolognesi Barranco	Oriental Chorrillos
5	1931	Zona de Lima	Juventud Nepeña	Unión América
5	1931	Zona del Rímac	Atlético Espinar	Combinado Rímac
5	1931	Zona del Callao	Atlético Excelsior	América Callao
5	1931	Zona de Balnearios 1	Santiago de Surco	Alianza Miraflores
5	1931	Zona de Balnearios 2	Independencia Miraflores	Juventud Barranco
6	1932	Zona Este	Asociación Deportiva Tarapacá	Circolo Sportivo Manzanilla
6	1932	Zona Oeste	Atlético Santa Rosa	Urbanización Jesús María
6	1932	Zona del Rímac	Asociación Rímac	Nacional FBC
6	1932	Zona de Balnearios	Alianza Risso	Juventud Barranco
7	1933	Zona Este	Alianza Firpo	Once Amigos Lobatón
7	1933	Zona Oeste	Simón Maggiolo	Sport San Jacinto
7	1933	Zona del Rímac	KDT Nacional	Combinado Rímac
7	1933	Zona de Balnearios	Fraternal Barranco	Estudiantes Chorrillos
8	1934	Zona Este	Victoria FBC	Eleven Boys
8	1934	Zona Oeste	Alianza San Martín	Departamento de Lambayeque
8	1934	Zona del Rímac	Sport Arica Infantas	Roberto Acevedo
8	1934	Zona de Balnearios	Sport Almagro	Atlético Miraflores
9	1935	Zona Este	Alianza Risso	Racing FBC
9	1935	Zona Oeste	Juventud San Martín	Atlético Ucayali
9	1935	Zona del Rímac	Nacional FBC	Atlético Espinar
9	1935	Zona de Balnearios	Agricultor de Surco	Alfonso Ugarte Barranco
10	1936	Zona Este	Defensor Arica	Sanguinetti y Dasso
10	1936	Zona Oeste	Deportivo Yaravi	Defensor Lima
10	1936	Zona del Rímac	Centro Iqueño	Imperio de Los Incas
10	1936	Zona de Balnearios	Oriental Chorrillos	José Olaya Chorrillos
11	1937	Zona Este	Coronel León Velarde	Unión Guadalupe
11	1937	Zona Oeste	Unión Santa Catalina	Juventud Manco Cápac
11	1937	Zona del Rímac	Diego de Almagro	San Lorenzo del Rímac
11	1937	Zona de Balnearios	Atlético Libertad	Ayacucho Barranco
12	1938	Zona Este	Mariscal Sucre	Circolo Sportivo Manzanilla
12	1938	Zona Oeste	Racing FBC	Nacional N°1
12	1938	Zona del Rímac	Alianza Pino	San Lorenzo del Rímac
12	1938	Zona de Balnearios	Huracán Barranco	Ciclista Alianza Miraflores
13	1939	Zona Este	Defensor Guido	Sport Santa Beatriz
13	1939	Zona Oeste	Francisco Daga	Sport Ilo
13	1939	Zona del Rímac	Juventud Soledad	Estrella N°1
13	1939	Zona de Balnearios	Association Chorrillos	Defensor Surquillo
14	1940	Serie A	Sport Ilo	Alianza Grau
14	1940	Serie B	Combinado Rímac	Pedro Icochea
14	1940	Serie C	Unión Buenos Chorrillos	Oriental Chorrillos
–	1941–1950	The Liga Regional de Lima y Callao was played.		
15	1951		Mariscal Castilla	Atlético Peruano
16	1952			
17	1953			
18	1954			
19	1955		Mariano Necochea	Sport Lince
20	1956		Atlético Banfield	Deportivo Salaverry
21	1957		Alianza Amazonas	Juventud Huascarán
22	1958		Sport José Gálvez	
23	1959			
24	1960			
25	1961			
26	1962			
27	1963			
28	1964			
29	1965			
30	1966			
31	1967			
32	1968			
33	1969			
34	1970			
35	1971			
36	1972			
37	1973			
38	1974			
Defunct Tournament

== Liga Provincial del Callao ==
=== Primera División ===
Ed.	Season	Champion	Runner-up
1	1932	Atlético Chalaco	Alianza Frigorífico
2	1933	Alianza Frigorífico	Jorge Chávez
3	1934	Atlético Chalaco	Telmo Carbajo
4	1935	Atlético Chalaco	Telmo Carbajo
–	1936	The 1936 Primera División Unificada was played.	
5	1937	Progresista Apurímac	White Star
6	1938	Telmo Carbajo	Jorge Chávez
7	1939	Social San Carlos	Telmo Carbajo
8	1940	Telmo Carbajo	Social San Carlos
–	1941–1950	The Liga Regional de Lima y Callao was played.	
As Third Division tournament
9	1951	Jorge Washington	San Lorenzo de Almagro
10	1952	San Lorenzo de Almagro	Atlético Barrio Frigorífico
–	1953	It was not played as a protest against the FPF.	
11	1954	Chim Pum Callao	Atlético Barrio Frigorífico
12	1955	Unidad Vecinal Nº3	Chim Pum Callao
13	1956	Sport Dinámico	Deportivo Colonial
14	1957	Sport Dinámico	Telmo Carbajo
15	1958	Sport Dinámico	Telmo Carbajo
16	1959	Sport Dinámico	Chim Pum Callao
17	1960	Telmo Carbajo	Sport Dinámico
18	1961	Íntimos de la Legua	Telmo Carbajo
19	1962	Deportivo Vigil	San Lorenzo de Almagro
20	1963	ADO	Atlético Sicaya
21	1964	Atlético Sicaya	Sport Dinámico
22	1965	Atlético Barrio Frigorífico	Atlético Ayacucho
23	1966	Atlético Chalaco	Atlético Barrio Frigorífico
24	1967	Deportivo SIMA	Atlético Barrio Frigorífico
25	1968	Atlético Barrio Frigorífico	
26	1969	Grumete Medina	Atlético Barrio Frigorífico
27	1970	Atlético Chalaco	Grumete Medina
28	1971	Sport Dinámico	
29	1972	Grumete Medina	Teófilo Zavalaga
30	1973	Atlético Barrio Frigorífico	Deportivo El Bronce
31	1974	Deportivo SIMA	Defensor La Perla
Defunct Tournament (See: Liga Distrital del Callao)

=== División Intermedia ===
Ed.	Season	Champion	Runner-up
1	1932	Federico Fernandini	Jorge Chávez
2	1933	Atlético Excelsior	White Star
3	1934	Porteño	Boca Juniors
As Third Division tournament
4	1935	Progresista Apurímac	White Star
5	1936	Unión Estrella	Social San Carlos
6	1937	Sportivo Palermo	KDT Nacional
7	1938	Scuola Deportiva Italia	Sporting Bellavista
8	1939	No completed due to lack of sports fields.	
9	1940	Santiago Rossell	Alianza Tucumán
–	1941–1950	The Liga Regional de Lima y Callao was played.	
Defunct Tournament

=== Segunda División ===
Ed.	Season	Champion	Runner-up
1	1932	Atlético Excelsior	Próspero y Mario Antola
2	1933	Boca Juniors	Atlético América
3	1934	Sportivo Palermo	Deportivo Corsario
–	1935	No tournament.	
4	1936	Unión Vigil	Sporting Bellavista
5	1937	Real Felipe	Scuola Deportiva Italia
6	1938	Alianza Tucumán	San Lorenzo de Almagro
7	1939	Once Camaradas	Progresista Aguilar
8	1940	Jorge Washington	Alianza Callao
–	1941–1950	The Liga Regional de Lima y Callao was played.	
9	1951	ADO	Progresista Apurímac
10	1952	Chim Pum Callao	
11	1953	Sport Dinámico	Deportivo CAR
12	1954	Unidad Vecinal Nº3	Francisco Pizarro
13	1955	Francisco Pizarro	Unión Estrella
14	1956	Jorge Washington	Deportivo Vigil
15	1957	Deportivo Vigil	White Star
16	1958	Antonio Miró Quesada	White Star
17	1959	White Star	Íntimos de La Legua
18	1960	Once Amigos Unión	Alianza Cochrane
19	1961	Atlético Ayacucho	Atlético Barrio Frigorífico
20	1962	Atlético Roma	Defensor Tacna Norte
21	1963	Alfredo Alvarado	México FBC
22	1964	Independiente Chacaritas	Telmo Carbajo
23	1965	Jorge Washington	Barcelona Miramar
24	1966	Deportivo SIMA	Barcelona Miramar
25	1967		
26	1968	Jorge Washington	
27	1969	Alianza Miranaves	
28	1970	Once Amigos Unión	
29	1971		
30	1972		
31	1973		
32	1974	Defensor Tacna Norte	
Defunct Tournament

=== Tercera División ===
Ed.	Season	Champion	Runner-up
1	1932	Atlético Deportes Colón	Boca Juniors
2	1933	Real Felipe	Atlético Bilis
3	1934	Atlético Bilis	Sportivo Águila
–	1935–1940	No tournament.	
–	1941–1950	The Liga Regional de Lima y Callao was played.	
4	1951	Chim Pum Callao	Deportivo CAR
5	1952	Sport Dinámico	Francisco Pizarro
6	1953	Unidad Vecinal Nº3	Francisco Pizarro
7	1954	Porteño	Cultura y Amistad
8	1955	Deportivo Vigil	
9	1956	Alianza Callao	México FBC
10	1957	Once Amigos Unión	Callao Longo
11	1958	Íntimos de la Legua	Atlético Ayacucho
12	1959	Alianza Cochrane	Atlético Ayacucho
13	1960		
14	1961	Barcelona Miramar	
15	1962		
16	1963		
17	1964		
18	1965		
19	1966		
20	1967		
21	1968		
22	1969		
23	1970		
24	1971		
25	1972		
26	1973	Barrio Fiscal Nº2	
27	1974	Deportivo ENAMM	
Defunct Tournament

== Liga de los Balnearios del Sur ==
- The disappearance of the Liga de los Balnearios del Sur occurred in 1975, following the creation of the Liga Distrital de Barranco (1975), Liga Distrital de Chorrillos (1960), Liga Distrital de Miraflores (1974), Liga Distrital de Surquillo (1970) and Liga Distrital de Santiago de Surco (1970).

=== Primera División ===
Ed.	Season	Champion	Runner-up
1	1956	Sport Almagro	Unión Surco
2	1957	Defensor Espinar	Ciclista Alianza Miraflores
3	1958	San Antonio Miraflores	Juventud Barranco
4	1959	Alianza Chorrillos	Association Chorrillos
5	1960	Association Chorrillos	Defensor Espinar
6	1961	Víctor Bielich	Defensor Espinar
7	1962	Defensor Espinar^{[D]}	Independiente Melgar
8	1963	Santiago Barranco	Boca Juniors (Chorrillos)
9	1964	Association Chorrillos	Santiago Barranco
10	1965	Association Chorrillos	Santiago Barranco
11	1966	Unión Buenos Aires Chorrillos	Association Chorrillos
12	1967	Sport Huáscar Barranco	Association Chorrillos
13	1968	Sport Almagro	
14	1969	Enrique Barrón	
15	1970	Santiago Barranco	
16	1971	Sport Santa Rosa	
17	1972	Association Chorrillos	Unión Buenos Aires Chorrillos
18	1973	Santiago Barranco	Porvenir Miraflores
19	1974	Aurora Miraflores	Unión Buenos Aires Chorrillos
Defunct Tournament

==== Footnotes ====
D. In 1962, the FPF annulled the tournament due to the clubs’ defiance in refusing to comply with the decision of the FPF’s Disciplinary Committee to play the suspended match between Víctor Bielich and Ciclista Alianza Miraflores.

=== Segunda División ===
Ed.	Season	Champion	Runner-up
1	1956	Alianza Chorrillos	Alianza Progreso
2	1957	San Antonio	Juventud Barranco
3	1958	Atlético Cervantes	Juventud Tejada
4	1959	Sport Huáscar Barranco	Juventud Tejada
5	1960	Víctor Bielich	Alianza Surquillo
6	1961	Sport Huáscar Barranco	Juventud Tejada
7	1962	Social Surquillo	Alianza Progreso
8	1963	Unión Buenos Aires Chorrillos	Juventud Lurín
10	1965	Enrique Barrón	San Antonio
11	1966	Sport Santa Rosa	Alianza Chorrillos
Defunct Tournament

=== Tercera División ===
Ed.	Season		Champion	Runner-up
1	1956		Alianza Surquillo	Defensor Tarapacá
2	1957	Serie A	Sport San Pedro	Sport Balta
2	1957	Serie B	Íntimos La Paz	San Cristóbal
Defunct Tournament
