= Centro Iqueño =

- Full name: Club Centro Iqueño
- Nickname: Los albos de la calle Monzón
- Founded: October 12, 1935; 90 years ago
Home colours	Away colours

Centro Iqueño is a Peruvian football club, located in the city of Lima. It was founded on October 12, 1935 and plays in the Copa Perú, which is the third division of the Peruvian league.

On January 27, 1970, the club played its last match in the First Division, drawing 0–0 with Sporting Cristal, and was relegated to the 1971 Peruvian Segunda División along with KDT Nacional.

Iqueño finished second from bottom in the relegation table with 13 points. The regulations stipulated that the bottom two teams in the standings would be relegated.

Its last participation came in the 1993 Peruvian Segunda División tournament. Currently, the club only takes part in youth competitions.

== History ==
Centro Iqueño was founded on October 12, 1935, on Misti Street and registered at 429 Ramón Zavala Street in the Rímac District (although other versions place its origin on the third block of Lima Street, in what is now Pueblo Libre). It was established by Víctor Picasso Rodríguez, Fernando Nieri, his brother Guillermo (the club’s first goalkeeper), and Alfredo Malatesta, together with a group of Italo-Iqueño residents in the capital, including Juan de Dios Merel, Amador Illescas, Rolando Cevasco, and Emilio Quintana. The club was named Centro Iqueño de Deportes y Estudios.

Football was the first sport practiced by the newly formed club, and in 1936 it affiliated with the Third Division of the Rímac League. Shortly afterward, it moved its headquarters to Monzón Street—now Lino Cornejo—in the Cercado area, near the Rímac River. Over the decades, this led to the club becoming known as “Los albos de la calle Monzón.”

In 1937, the club merged with Sportivo Tarapacá Ferrocarril and acquired its sporting category. As a result, the albo side entered directly into the 1938 Liga Provincial de Lima (equivalent to the second tier). It later joined the Liga Regional de Lima y Callao in 1941.

In 1942, Centro Iqueño took part in the 1941 Liguilla de Promoción and ultimately secured promotion to the 1942 Peruvian Primera División.

Since its foundation, the club has developed players who went on to represent various teams and the Peruvian national sides, such as Roberto “Tito” Drago, Guillermo Delgado, José del Castillo, and Adolfo Donayre. It also developed Roberto Chale and Ramón Mifflin, who both played midfield in the 1970 World Cup.

Centro Iqueño developed numerous players who were later signed by clubs with greater financial resources. The club was relegated following financial difficulties.

The club was noted for its refined and attractive style of play, characterised by polished, elegant football and excellent ball control, which earned it considerable admiration from fans. The late coach Eugenio Castañeda was widely regarded as the main architect of this distinctive footballing approach.

In terms of classic fixtures in Peruvian football, Centro Iqueño frequently recorded victories over Alianza Lima, earning it the nickname “La sombra blanca de Alianza Lima” (“The white shadow of Alianza Lima”).

A supporter might be a fan of Universitario de Deportes, Alianza Lima, Deportivo Municipal, Sport Boys, Atlético Chalaco, Ciclista Lima, or Sporting Cristal, but if their team was not playing against Iqueño, an irresistible sense of sympathy would momentarily turn them into an Iqueño supporter.

In the 1957 Peruvian Primera División, in the decisive match played on January 6, 1958, the club defeated Universitario de Deportes 2–1, crowning itself Peruvian football champions. At the time, the team was managed by Roberto Scarone, a Uruguayan coach who, just three years later, would lead Peñarol to the Uruguayan league title, the 1960 Copa Libertadores, and subsequently the 1961 Intercontinental Cup.

The typical starting lineup during that 1957 campaign included Fernando Cárpena, José Allen, Adolfo Donayre, José Castro, Carlos Arce (Paraguayan), Augusto Del Valle (captain), Enrique Montenegro, Antonio Palomino, Fernando Olaechea, Carlos Abel Linazza (Argentine), and Ricardo Quiñónez (Paraguayan). In the title-deciding match, the albos scored through Montenegro and Palomino in the 29th and 40th minutes of the first half. Alfredo Huaranga Daga also featured successfully in the starting team during the 1957 season.

Carlos Linazza later joined Peñarol, where he accompanied Roberto Scarone in the successes the coach achieved in South American and world football.

The 1957 champion Centro Iqueño confirmed its supremacy in Peruvian professional football by winning the Campeonato de Apertura title at the beginning of 1958, defeating Universitario de Deportes and then Atlético Chalaco in the final. The team was managed by Paraguayan coach Miguel Ortega, who during those years promoted young talents such as José del Castillo, Alejandro Zevallos, Jesús Peláez, and Jorge “Gato” Vásquez as part of the attacking line, alongside the talented and elegant midfielder and captain Juan Biselach.

Their style of play was a true delight for fans in the late 1950s. In the early 1960s, right-back Moisés Barack joined the squad. Miguel Ortega remained in charge of the albo side until 1961.

In 1962, the club won the Torneo Relámpago under the management of Alfredo Huaranga Daga, with the contribution of José Navarro, Daniel Chávez, Félix Escobar, Jesús Peláez, De la Oliva, and Jorge “Gato” Vásquez.

In 1964 and 1965, Centro Iqueño featured Ramón Mifflin and Roberto Challe, who later became prominent figures in Peruvian football.

The club has played at the highest level of Peruvian football on twenty four occasions, from 1942 Peruvian Primera División until 1969 Torneo Descentralizado, when it was relegated.

After its relegation, Centro Iqueño played in the Second Division until 1972, when the category was dissolved by the military government in power. It then competed in the Liga Provincial de Lima and Liga Distrital de Cercado de Lima until 1983. In 1984, it was invited to take part in the Peruvian Segunda División, where it remained until 1986, when it was relegated once again to its league of origin. That same year, Víctor Picasso Jr. strengthened the club’s youth divisions in the districts of Surco and La Molina.

The club sponsored Juventud La Joya de Chancay during the 1987 season—also providing its main kit—in both the Peruvian Primera División and the División Intermedia; however, the partnership ended in 1988.

In 1991, the club competed in Región IX Metropolitana of the Copa Perú, finishing first in Group B. It then contested promotion to the Peruvian Segunda División against Alcides Vigo, winner of Group A, but lost 4–3 and failed to secure a return to that level.

In 1993, it made use of a Peruvian Segunda División spot through Enrique Lau Chun, with whom it had a preliminary merger agreement that ultimately did not materialize; as a result, it only ceded its name and kit for commercial purposes.

Finally, in 1994, back in the Liga Distrital de Cercado de Lima, the team was relegated to the Second District Division. The following year, it did not take part in the competition and was consequently disaffiliated, remaining inactive ever since.

== Statistics and results in First Division ==
=== League history ===
Season	Div.	Pos.	Pl.	W	D	L	GF	GA	P	Notes
1949	1st	8	21	3	6	12	27	54	12	8/8 Regular season
1950	1st	7	18	6	5	7	33	39	17	7/10 Regular season
1951	1st	6	18	7	2	9	29	32	16	6/10 Regular season
1952	1st	5	18	8	3	7	38	34	19	5/10 Regular season
1953	1st	4	18	7	6	5	26	27	20	4/10 Regular season
1954	1st	4	18	7	6	5	25	22	20	4/10 Regular season
1955	1st	3	18	10	3	5	23	13	23	3/10 Regular season
1956	1st	6	18	6	3	9	23	28	15	6/10 Regular season
1957	1st	1	22	10	7	5	38	23	27	1/10 Regular season
1958	1st	6	22	10	3	9	37	32	23	6/10 Regular season
1959	1st	3	22	11	5	6	43	36	27	3/10 Regular season
1960	1st	5	18	7	6	5	35	30	20	5/10 Regular season
1961	1st	3	18	9	2	7	35	34	20	3/10 Regular season
1962	1st	4	18	8	5	5	39	33	21	4/10 Regular season
1963	1st	5	18	7	4	7	25	27	18	5/10 Regular season
1964	1st	6	22	10	5	7	24	24	16	6/10 Regular season
1965	1st	8	22	4	8	10	24	37	16	8/10 Regular season
1966	1st	5	26	13	4	9	31	27	21	5/14 Regular season
1967	1st	10	26	5	11	10	28	41	21	10/14 Regular season
1968	1st	13	26	5	4	17	24	56	14	13/14 Regular season
1969	1st	13	20	3	7	10	19	33	13	13/14 Regular season

== Honours ==
=== Senior titles ===
Keys

- Record
- ^{(s)} Shared record

Type	Competition	Titles	Runner-up	Winning years	Runner-up years
National (League)	Primera División	1	—	1957	—
National (League)	Segunda División	1	1	1948	1970
Half-year / Short tournament (League)	Campeonato de Apertura (ANA)	1	2	1958	1953, 1960
Regional (League)	Región IX Metropolitana	1	—	1990 Serie B	—
Regional (League)	Liga Provincial de Lima (Interligas de Lima)	—	1	—	1991
Regional (League)	Primera División Regional de Lima y Callao	—	1	—	1941
Regional (League)	Liga Distrital de Cercado de Lima	1	—	1975	—
Regional (League)	Primera División Amateur de Lima	—	3	—	1938, 1939, 1973 Serie B
Regional (League)	Tercera División Amateur de Lima	1	—	1936 Zona Rímac	—

=== Youth ===
Type	Competition	Titles	Runner-up	Winning years	Runner-up years
National (League)	Torneo Equipos de Reserva	2	—	1950, 1951	—

== Notable managers ==
- (Uruguay) Roberto Scarone (1957)

== Notable players ==
- (Peru) Roberto Drago (1939)
- (Peru) César Socarraz (1945–1946)
- (Peru) Guillermo Delgado (1948–1949, 1951)
- (Peru) Adolfo Donayre (1954–1955, 1957–1958, 1966–1967)
- (Peru) Juan Biselach (1959–1965)
- (Peru) José del Castillo (1960)
- (Peru) Ramón Mifflin (1963–1964)
- (Peru) Roberto Challe (1964–1965)
- (Peru) Félix Salinas (1965)
- (Peru) Moisés Barack (1966–1967)

== See also ==
- List of football clubs in Peru
- Peruvian football league system
