= Progresista Apurímac =

Peruvian football club

- Full name: Club Social Progresista Apurímac
- Founded: 11 October 1932
- Dissolved: 1977
- Ground: Estadio Telmo Carbajo
- Capacity: 8,000
- League: Copa Perú
Home colours

Progresista Apurímac was a Peruvian football club, playing in the city of Callao, Lima, Peru.

== History ==
The Club Social Progresista Apurímac was founded on October 11, 1932. After winning the División Intermedia del Callao in 1935, they qualified for the 1936 Primera División Unificada de Lima y Callao, where they failed to obtain promotion to the 1937 Peruvian Primera División, which remained in the hands of Deportivo Municipal and Sportivo Melgar.

The club participate in the 1938 Peruvian Primera División, but was relegated in the same year with Alianza Lima.

The Club Social Progresista Apurímac participated in the Peruvian Segunda División and was the runner-up in the 1943 season. It remained in Peruvian Segunda División until the 1946 season when it finished in last place tied with Santiago Barranco and in the tiebreaker fell 7-0 losing the category.

In the following years, the club participated in the Liga Regional de Lima y Callao and, after it disappears, the club participated in the Liga Provincial del Callao in its different categories until its disappearance in 1977.

== Statistics and results in First Division ==
=== League history ===
Season	Div.	Pos.	Pl.	W	D	L	GF	GA	P	Notes
1938	1st	9	8	2	1	5	9	19	13	9/9 Regular Season

== Honours ==
=== Senior titles ===
Keys

- Record
- ^{(s)} Shared record

Type	Competition	Titles	Runner-up	Winning years	Runner-up years
National (League)	Segunda División	—	1	—	1943
Regional (League)	Primera División Regional de Lima y Callao	—	1	—	1942
Regional (League)	Primera División Amateur del Callao	1	1	1937	1951
Regional (League)	División Intermedia (Callao)	1	1	1935	1934
Regional (League)	Tercera División Amateur del Callao	1	—	1932	—

== See also ==
- List of football clubs in Peru
- Peruvian football league system
