= 1947 Peruvian Primera División =

Peruvian Primera División
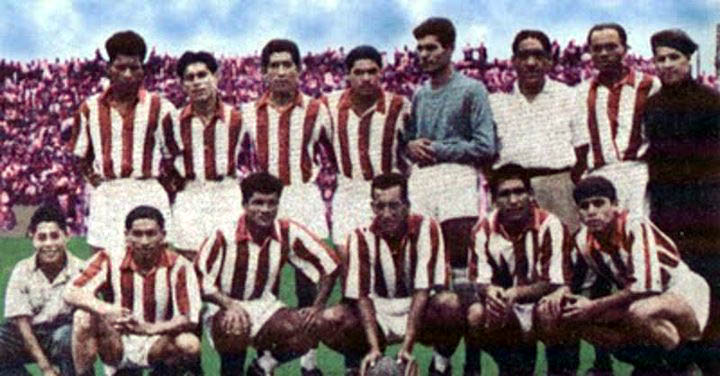
- Atlético Chalaco, champions
- Season: 1947
- Dates: 18 May 1947 – 26 October 1947
- Champions: Atlético Chalaco (2nd title)
- Runner up: Deportivo Municipal
- Relegated: none
- 1948 Copa de Campeones: Deportivo Municipal
- Matches: 84
- Goals: 318 (3.79 per match)
- Top goalscorer: Valeriano López (20 goals)

The 1947 Campeonato de Selección y Competencia, the top category of Peruvian football at the time, was played by eight teams. The national champion was Atlético Chalaco.

There was no relegation, as it was officially approved by the Comité Nacional de Deportes on December 3, 1947, after the tournament had already concluded.

== Competition format ==
All teams faced each other in a triple round-robin format. The team that accumulated the highest number of points at the end of the season was automatically crowned champion, while the team with the fewest points was relegated to the Peruvian Segunda División.

Two points were awarded for a win, one point for a draw, and no points for a loss.

== Teams ==
=== Team changes ===
Promoted from 1946 Segunda División	Relegated from 1946 Primera División
▲ Ciclista Lima (1st)	▼ Centro Iqueño (8th)

=== Stadia and locations ===
Team	City	Mannager
Alianza Lima	La Victoria, Lima	(Peru) Adelfo Magallanes
Atlético Chalaco	Callao	(Peru) José Arana
Ciclista Lima	Cercado de Lima	
Deportivo Municipal	Cercado de Lima	(Peru) Juan Valdivieso
Sport Boys	Callao	(Peru) Enrique Aróstegui
Sporting Tabaco	Rímac, Lima	(Peru) Rodolfo Ortega
Sucre	La Victoria, Lima	(England) Randolph Galloway
Universitario	Cercado de Lima	(Peru) Arturo Fernández

== League table ==
=== Standings ===
Pos	Team	Pld	W	D	L	GF	GA	GD	Pts	Qualification or relegation
1	Atlético Chalaco (C)	21	10	7	4	40	29	+11	27	Champions
2	Deportivo Municipal	21	10	5	6	56	36	+20	25	1948 Copa de Campeones
3	Sport Boys	21	8	7	6	39	26	+13	23	
4	Alianza Lima	21	7	6	8	41	49	−8	20	
5	Ciclista Lima	21	8	4	9	39	45	−6	20	
6	Sucre	21	8	3	10	28	43	−15	19	
7	Sporting Tabaco	21	7	3	11	45	51	−6	17	
8	Universitario	21	7	3	11	30	39	−9	17	

(C) Champions

== Results ==
=== Matches 1–14 ===
Home \ Away	ALI	CHA	CIC	MUN	SBA	TAB	SUC	UNI
Alianza Lima		3–5	2–1	1–5	2–2	3–3	1–0	4–0
Atlético Chalaco	3–0		2–2	2–2	2–2	4–2	3–1	0–1
Ciclista Lima	2–2	0–2		6–4	2–1	3–2	4–0	3–2
Deportivo Municipal	1–1	1–1	6–0		1–1	2–1	0–1	3–1
Sport Boys	4–1	1–2	3–3	3–2		0–2	0–1	4–1
Sporting Tabaco	2–3	2–3	2–0	0–4	0–3		6–1	0–4
Sucre	4–1	2–1	0–2	4–2	0–4	4–4		2–0
Universitario	3–4	1–0	3–2	3–5	1–3	4–2	0–1	

Updated to match(es) played on 1947. Source: Diario El Comercio, La Prensa and Crónica.
Legend: Blue = home team win; Yellow = draw; Red = away team win.

=== Matches 15–21 ===
Home \ Away	ALI	CHA	CIC	MUN	SBA	TAB	SUC	UNI
Alianza Lima			2–1		2–2	4–2		
Atlético Chalaco	2–1		4–3			2–2	0–0	
Ciclista Lima				0–5		4–1		
Deportivo Municipal	4–2	1–2					4–1	2–2
Sport Boys		2–0	0–0	0–1			3–1	
Sporting Tabaco				4–1	1–0			1–0
Sucre	1–1		2–0			2–6		0–1
Universitario	2–1	0–0	0–1		1–1			

Updated to match(es) played on 1947. Source: Diario El Comercio, La Prensa and Crónica.
Legend: Blue = home team win; Yellow = draw; Red = away team win.

== Top scorers ==
Rank	Player	Club	Goals
1	(Peru) Valeriano López	Sport Boys	20
2	(Peru) Jorge Alcalde	Deportivo Municipal	16
2	(Peru) Félix Mina	Atlético Chalaco	16
3	(Peru) Teodoro Fernández	Universitario	14
3	(Peru) Máximo Mosquera	Deportivo Municipal	14
3	(Peru) Óscar Herrera	Alianza Lima	14

== Controversy ==
The championship had no relegation, but a controversy still remains over an extra match that was never played: the game between Sporting Tabaco and Universitario to determine which team would avoid relegation, since both sides finished in the bottom places of the overall standings.

It is worth noting that in October 1947, the sports authorities reportedly proposed expanding the number of teams for the 1948 tournament to ten. However, the championship continued to be played under the regular competition rules, which included one relegation and one promotion.

Subsequently, the Comité Nacional de Deportes officially approved the cancellation of relegation one month after the end of the 1947 regular tournament (December 3), while the pending match between Sporting Tabaco and Universitario de Deportes had not yet been played, which generated considerable controversy.

It was also established that the 1948 tournament would have nine teams instead of ten, which avoided having an even number of clubs and preserved the traditional double-header match scheduling.

As a result of this decision, Unión Callao and Santiago Barranco, who had tied for second place in the 1947 Peruvian Segunda División behind champions Jorge Chávez, also did not play the playoff that would have determined a second promotion spot.

== See also ==
- 1947 Campeonato de Apertura
- 1947 Peruvian Segunda División
- 1947–I Torneo_Relámpago
- 1947–II Torneo_Relámpago
