= Pedro Valdivieso (footballer) =

Peruvian footballer and manager (born 1922)

Personal information
- Full name: Pedro Valdivieso Mejía
- Date of birth: 19 October 1922
- Place of birth: Lima, Peru
- Date of death: ?
- Position: Forward

Senior career*
Years	Team	Apps	(Gls)
1942–1944	Defensor Arica		
1945	Sport Boys	15	(8)
1946	C.D. Español		
1947–1954	Sport Boys	133	(44)
1955	Ciclista Lima		
1956	Porvenir Miraflores		
1957	Mariscal Castilla		

International career
1949	Peru	1	(0)

Managerial career
- 1959: Mariscal Castilla
- 1963: Porvenir Miraflores
- 1965: Porvenir Miraflores
- 1967: CNI
- 1970: ADO
- 1972: Deportivo SIMA
- 1976: Defensor Lima
- * Club domestic league appearances and goals

Pedro Valdivieso Mejía (19 October 1922 – unknown) was a Peruvian football manager and former player.

== Playing career ==
=== Club career ===
Nicknamed Perro (the dog), Valdivieso was an important player for Sport Boys, arriving in 1945 from Defensor Arica. He scored 45 goals in 148 matches between 1945 and 1954 and won the Peruvian championship in 1951.

He nevertheless experienced a brief period of expatriation in Venezuela with C.D. Español, where he won the Venezuelan championship in 1946. He ended his career at the end of the 1950s with Mariscal Castilla.

=== International career ===
Called up for the 1949 South American Championship in Brazil, Valdivieso only played one match when he replaced Alfredo Mosquera in the game against Bolivia (3–0 victory).

== Managerial career ==
Having become a coach, Valdivieso had the opportunity to manage various clubs, including Mariscal Castilla in 1959, Porvenir Miraflores (twice, in 1963 and 1965), and CNI of Iquitos in 1967. In 1970, he won the Second Division championship with ADO of Callao.

== Honours ==
=== Player ===
C.D. Español (Venezuela)

- Venezuelan Primera División: 1946

Sport Boys

- Peruvian Primera División: 1951

Porvenir Miraflores

- Peruvian Segunda División: 1956

Mariscal Castilla

- Peruvian Segunda División: 1957

=== Manager ===
ADO

- Peruvian Segunda División: 1970
