= 1953 Peruvian Primera División =

Peruvian Primera División
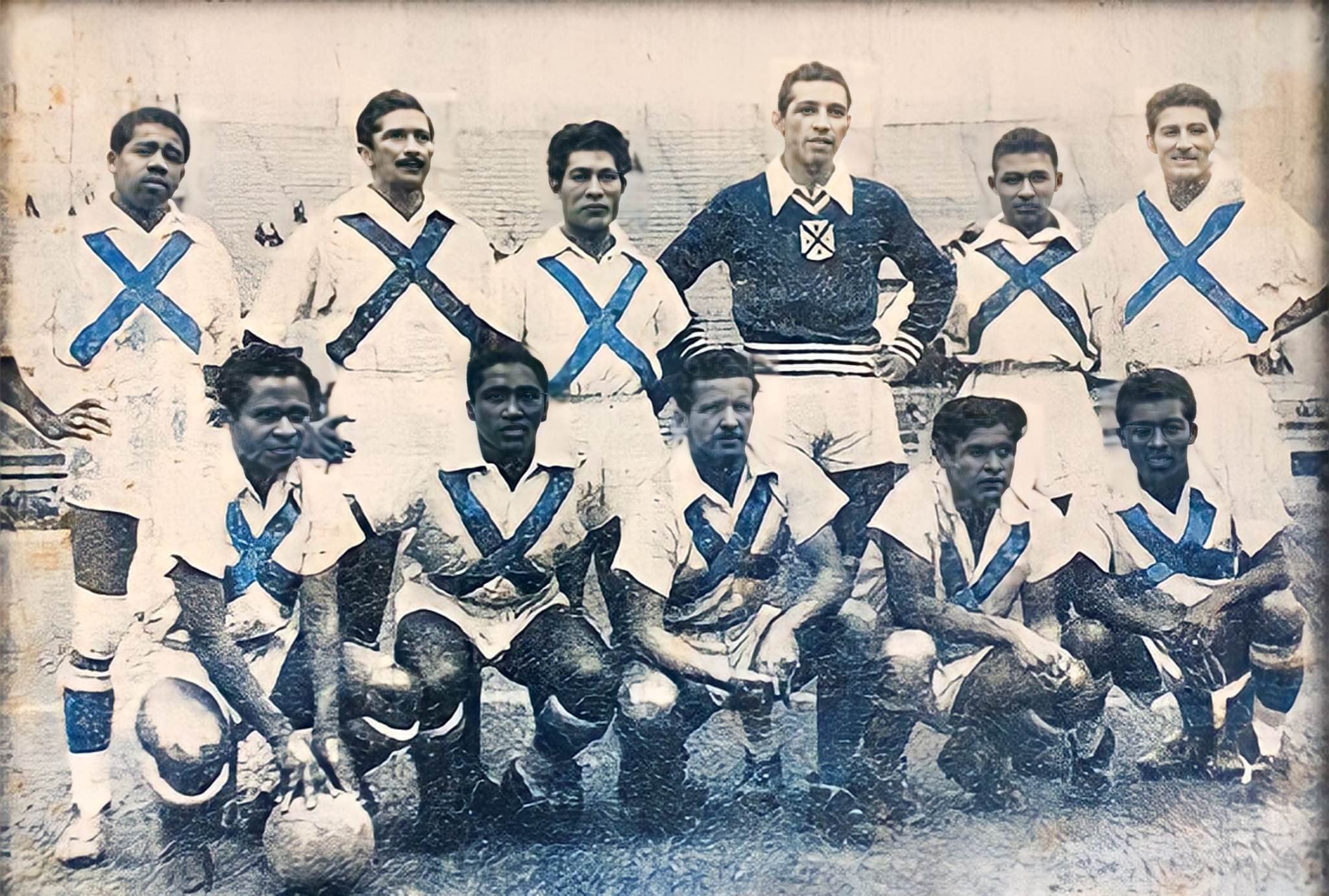
- Lineup of Mariscal Sucre, the national champions in 1953
- Season: 1953
- Dates: 6 June 1953 – 19 December 1953
- Champions: Mariscal Sucre (2nd title)
- Runner up: Alianza Lima
- Relegated: Unión Callao
- Matches: 90
- Goals: 326 (3.62 per match)
- Top goalscorer: Gualberto Bianco (17 goals)

The 1953 season of the Peruvian Primera División, the top category of Peruvian football, was played by 10 teams. The national champions were Mariscal Sucre.

== Competition format ==
All teams faced each other in a double round-robin format, playing home and away matches. The team that accumulated the highest number of points at the end of the season was automatically crowned champion, while the team with the fewest points was relegated to the Peruvian Segunda División.

Two points were awarded for a win, one point for a draw, and no points for a loss.

== Teams ==
=== Team changes ===
Promoted from 1952 Segunda División	Relegated from 1952 Primera División
▲ Unión Callao (1st)	▼ Association Chorrillos (10th)

=== Stadia locations ===
Team	City	Mannager
Alianza Lima	La Victoria, Lima	(Peru) Adelfo Magallanes
Atlético Chalaco	Callao	(Argentina) Francisco Villegas
Centro Iqueño	Cercado de Lima	(Uruguay) Roberto Scarone
Ciclista Lima	Cercado de Lima	(Argentina) Ángel Fernández Roca
Deportivo Municipal	Cercado de Lima	(Peru) Arturo Fernández
Mariscal Sucre	La Victoria, Lima	(Peru) Carlos Iturrizaga
Sport Boys	Callao	(Peru) Jorge Alcalde
Sporting Tabaco	Rímac, Lima	(Italy) Giuseppe Ottina
Unión Callao	Callao	(Peru) Segundo Castillo
Universitario	Breña, Lima	(Argentina) José Cuesta Silva

== League table ==
=== Standings ===
Pos	Team	Pld	W	D	L	GF	GA	GD	Pts	Qualification or relegation
1	Mariscal Sucre (C)	18	8	5	5	27	23	+4	21	Champions
2	Alianza Lima	18	8	4	6	44	29	+15	20	
3	Sporting Tabaco	18	7	6	5	40	34	+6	20	
4	Centro Iqueño	18	7	6	5	26	27	−1	20	
5	Atlético Chalaco	18	7	5	6	42	33	+9	19	
6	Universitario	18	7	5	6	38	36	+2	19	
7	Sport Boys	18	8	2	8	26	31	−5	18	
8	Deportivo Municipal	18	5	6	7	32	34	−2	16	
9	Ciclista Lima	18	4	6	8	24	37	−13	14	
10	Unión Callao (R)	18	4	5	9	27	42	−15	13	1954 Segunda División

(C) Champions; (R) Relegated

== Results ==
Home \ Away	ALI	CHA	IQU	CIC	MUN	SUC	SBA	TAB	CAL	UNI
Alianza Lima		5–1	5–1	2–0	2–2	1–0	1–2	0–2	2–0	2–3
Atlético Chalaco	1–1		1–2	5–1	1–1	2–3	1–1	3–3	8–0	3–1
Centro Iqueño	6–5	2–0		2–0	1–0	2–0	0–2	1–1	1–0	2–2
Ciclista Lima	1–1	2–1	1–1		2–2	0–1	1–5	3–5	4–0	1–1
Deportivo Municipal	2–4	1–2	3–2	1–0		2–2	1–0	0–1	4–1	4–4
Mariscal Sucre	3–1	1–2	2–0	2–2	2–0		1–2	1–0	1–1	2–1
Sport Boys	0–5	0–2	2–0	1–2	0–5	1–1		2–3	4–2	1–0
Sporting Tabaco	1–5	2–3	1–1	1–1	4–0	2–2	2–3		0–2	4–3
Unión Callao	0–0	3–2	1–1	5–1	3–3	0–2	3–0	4–4		2–3
Universitario	4–2	4–4	1–1	1–2	3–1	4–1	1–0	0–4	2–0	

Updated to match(es) played on 1953. Source: Diario El Comercio, La Prensa and Crónica.
Legend: Blue = home team win; Yellow = draw; Red = away team win.

== Top scorers ==
Rank	Player	Club	Goals
1	(Argentina) Gualberto Bianco	Atlético Chalaco	17
2	(Peru) Eugenio Zapata	Sporting Tabaco	16
3	(Argentina) José Abán	Mariscal Sucre	15
4	(Peru) Manuel Rivera	Deportivo Municipal	14
4	(Peru) Armando Reyes	Ciclista Lima	14
5	(Paraguay) Atilio López	Atlético Chalaco	13
5	(Peru) Juan Bazza	Mariscal Sucre	13

== See also ==
- 1953 Campeonato de Apertura
- 1953 Peruvian Segunda División
- 1953 Torneo Relámpago
