= 1951 Peruvian Segunda División =

Peruvian Segunda División
- Season: 1951
- Dates: 4 November 1951 – 13 January 1952
- Champions: Association Chorrillos
- Runner up: Atlético Lusitania
- Matches: 46
- Goals: 214 (4.65 per match)

The 1951 Peruvian Segunda División, the second division of Peruvian football (soccer), was played by 10 teams. The tournament winner, Association Chorrillos was promoted to the 1952 Peruvian Primera División.

== Teams ==
=== Team changes ===
Promoted from 1950 Liga Regional de Lima y Callao	Promoted to 1951 Primera División	Relegated from 1950 Primera División
▲KDT Nacional (1st) ▲ Juventud Gloria (2nd)	▲ Unión Callao (1st)	▼ Jorge Chávez (10th)

=== Stadia and locations ===
Team	City
Association Chorrillos	Chorrillos, Lima
Atlético Lusitania	Cercado de Lima
Carlos Concha	Callao
Defensor Arica	Breña, Lima
Jorge Chávez	Callao
Juventud Gloria	Cercado de Lima
KDT Nacional	Callao
Porvenir Miraflores	Miraflores, Lima
Santiago Barranco	Barranco, Lima
Unión Carbone	Cercado de Lima

== League table ==
=== Standings ===
Pos	Team	Pld	W	D	L	GF	GA	GD	Pts	Promotion or relegation
1	Atlético Lusitania	9	7	0	2	30	9	+21	14	Title Play-off
2	Association Chorrillos (C, O)	9	6	2	1	29	13	+16	14	Title Play-off
3	Santiago Barranco	9	6	1	2	23	14	+9	13	
4	Unión Carbone	9	5	0	4	26	21	+5	10	
5	Porvenir Miraflores	9	5	0	4	21	20	+1	10	
6	Defensor Arica	9	4	0	5	20	18	+2	8	
7	KDT Nacional	9	3	1	5	16	15	+1	7	
8	Juventud Gloria	9	3	1	5	17	17	0	7	
9	Carlos Concha	9	3	1	5	16	24	−8	7	
10	Jorge Chávez	9	0	0	9	9	56	−47	0	

(C) Champions; (O) Play-off winners

== Results ==
Teams play each other once, either home or away. All matches were played in Lima.

Home \ Away	ACH	LUS	CON	DAR	JCC	GLO	KDT	POR	SAN	CRB
Association Chorrillos		0–1		6–2	7–1				1–1	
Atlético Lusitania			3–0		9–1	1–2	2–1			5–2
Carlos Concha	3–3			2–6	6–3	1–0			0–5	
Defensor Arica		1–3					1–2	2–0		2–3
Jorge Chávez				0–4			0–2	0–7		1–10
Juventud Gloria	1–5			2–1	8–1				1–3	
KDT Nacional	1–2		0–3			2–2		1–2		5–0
Porvenir Miraflores	2–3	0–5	3–1			2–1			1–4	
Santiago Barranco		2–1		0–1	3–2		3–2			
Unión Carbone	1–2		1–0			1–0		3–4	5–2	

Updated to match(es) played on 1951. Source: Diario El Comercio, La Prensa and Crónica.
Legend: Blue = home team win; Yellow = draw; Red = away team win.

== Title Play-off ==
13 January 1952	Association Chorrillos	6–1	Atlético Lusitania	Estadio Universidad San Marcos, Lima

== See also ==
- 1951 Peruvian Primera División
