= 1953 Peruvian Segunda División =

Peruvian Segunda División
- Season: 1953
- Dates: 12 September 1953 – 7 November 1953
- Champions: Carlos Concha
- Runner up: Atlético Lusitania
- Matches: 45
- Goals: 188 (4.18 per match)
- Top goalscorer: Arias; Larrea (6 goals each)

The 1953 Peruvian Segunda División, the second division of Peruvian football (soccer), was played by 10 teams. The tournament winner, Carlos Concha was promoted to the 1954 Peruvian Primera División.

== Teams ==
=== Team changes ===
| Promoted to 1953 Primera División | Relegated from 1952 Primera División |
|---|---|
| ▲ Unión Callao (1st) | ▼ Association Chorrillos (10th) |

=== Stadia and locations ===
| Team | City |
|---|---|
| Association Chorrillos | Chorrillos, Lima |
| Atlético Lusitania | Cercado de Lima |
| Carlos Concha | Callao |
| Defensor Arica | Breña, Lima |
| Jorge Chávez | Callao |
| Juventud Gloria | Cercado de Lima |
| KDT Nacional | Callao |
| Porvenir Miraflores | Miraflores, Lima |
| Santiago Barranco | Barranco, Lima |
| Unión Carbone | Cercado de Lima |

== League table ==
=== Standings ===
| Pos | Team | Pld | W | D | L | GF | GA | GD | Pts | Qualification or relegation |
|---|---|---|---|---|---|---|---|---|---|---|
| 1 | Carlos Concha (C) | 9 | 7 | 1 | 1 | 22 | 9 | +13 | 15 | 1954 Primera División |
| 2 | Atlético Lusitania | 9 | 6 | 1 | 2 | 18 | 13 | +5 | 13 | |
| 3 | Jorge Chávez | 9 | 6 | 0 | 3 | 32 | 18 | +14 | 12 | |
| 4 | Santiago Barranco | 9 | 5 | 0 | 4 | 20 | 14 | +6 | 10 | |
| 5 | KDT Nacional | 9 | 3 | 3 | 3 | 21 | 19 | +2 | 9 | |
| 6 | Association Chorrillos | 9 | 3 | 3 | 3 | 16 | 14 | +2 | 9 | |
| 7 | Porvenir Miraflores | 9 | 2 | 2 | 5 | 18 | 25 | −7 | 6 | |
| 8 | Juventud Gloria | 9 | 3 | 0 | 6 | 18 | 29 | −11 | 6 | |
| 9 | Defensor Arica | 9 | 2 | 1 | 6 | 12 | 20 | −8 | 5 | |
| 10 | Unión Carbone | 9 | 2 | 1 | 6 | 11 | 30 | −19 | 5 | |

(C) Champions

== Results ==
Teams play each other once, either home or away. All matches were played in Lima.

| Home \ Away | ACH | LUS | CON | DAR | JCC | GLO | KDT | POR | SAN | CRB |
|---|---|---|---|---|---|---|---|---|---|---|
| Association Chorrillos | | 0–0 | 0–1 | | | 6–3 | | | 1–0 | 1–3 |
| Atlético Lusitania | | | | 2–1 | 1–5 | 2–0 | 2–1 | | | 4–0 |
| Carlos Concha | | 1–2 | | W.O. | | | 2–2 | 2–1 | | 7–0 |
| Defensor Arica | 2–1 | | | | 2–3 | 3–0 | | | 1–4 | |
| Jorge Chávez | 1–3 | | 1–0 | | | | 5–0 | 6–3 | | 6–1 |
| Juventud Gloria | | | 3–5 | | 5–3 | | | 2–1 | 2–3 | |
| KDT Nacional | 1–1 | | | 6–3 | | 5–1 | | 4–1 | | |
| Porvenir Miraflores | 3–3 | 2–3 | | 2–2 | | | | | 2–1 | |
| Santiago Barranco | | 3–1 | 1–3 | | 2–3 | | 2–0 | | | 4–1 |
| Unión Carbone | | | | 2–1 | | 0–2 | 2–2 | 2–3 | | |

Updated to match(es) played on 1953. Source: Diario El Comercio, La Prensa and Crónica.
Legend: Blue = home team win; Yellow = draw; Red = away team win.

== See also ==
- 1953 Peruvian Primera División
