= 1946 Peruvian Primera División =

Peruvian Primera División
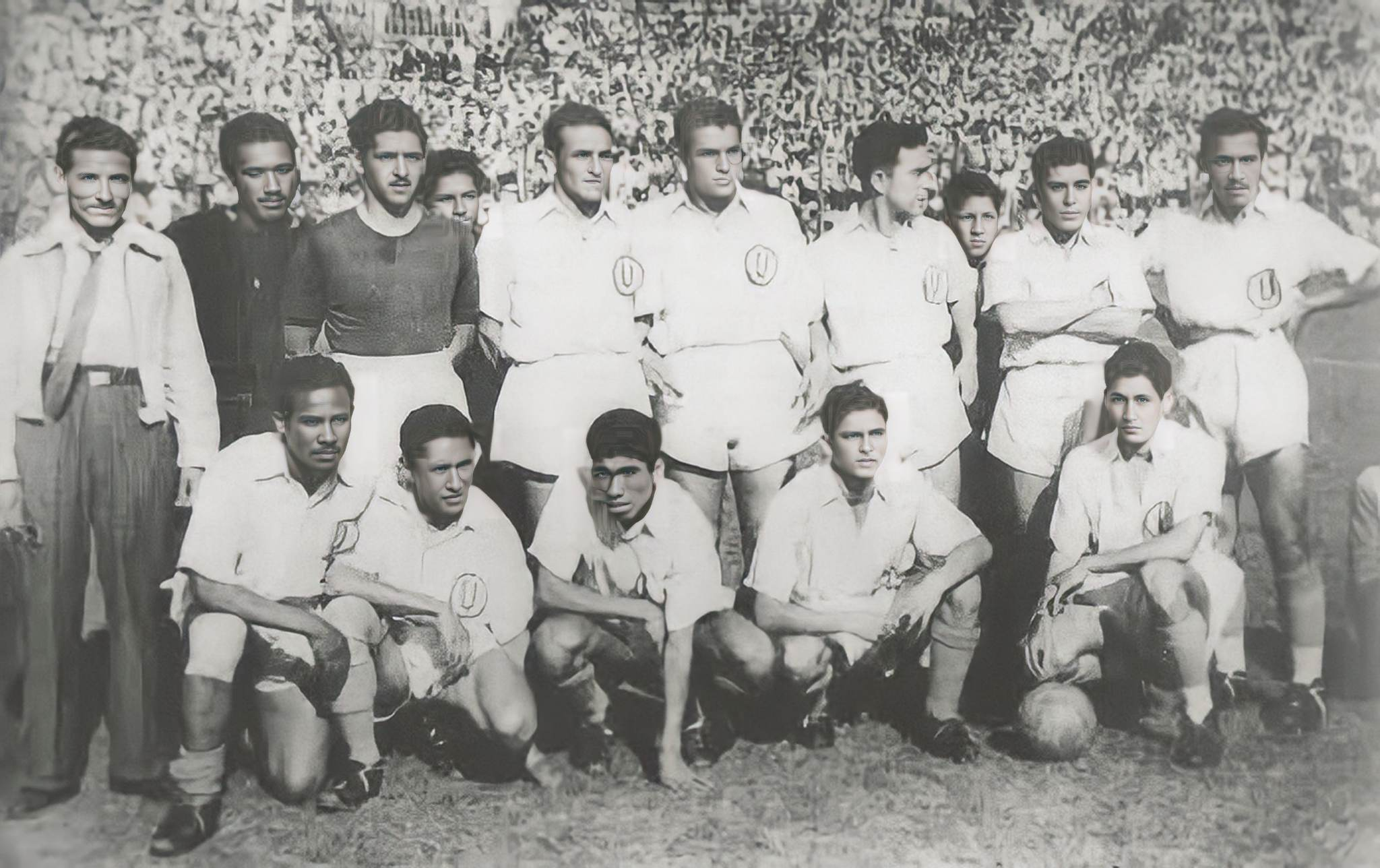
- Team Universitario, Photo taken 1945
- Season: 1946
- Dates: 19 May 1946 – 12 October 1946
- Champions: Universitario (6th title)
- Runner up: Deportivo Municipal
- Relegated: Centro Iqueño
- Matches: 84
- Goals: 380 (4.52 per match)
- Top goalscorer: Valeriano López (22 goals)

The 1946 season of the Peruvian Primera División, the top category of Peruvian football, was played by 8 teams. The national champions were Universitario.

== Competition format ==
All teams faced each other in a triple round-robin format. The team that accumulated the highest number of points at the end of the season was automatically crowned champion, while the team with the fewest points was relegated to the Peruvian Segunda División.

Two points were awarded for a win, one point for a draw, and no points for a loss.

== Teams ==
Team	City	Mannager
Alianza Lima	La Victoria, Lima	(Peru) Adelfo Magallanes
Atlético Chalaco	Callao	(Peru) Juan Bulnes
Centro Iqueño	Cercado de Lima	(Peru) Alfonso Huapaya
Deportivo Municipal	Cercado de Lima	(Peru) Juan Valdivieso
Sport Boys	Callao	(Peru) José Arana
Sporting Tabaco	Rímac, Lima	(Peru) Rodolfo Ortega
Sucre	La Victoria, Lima	(Chile) Abelardo Robles
Universitario	Cercado de Lima	(Peru) Arturo Fernández

== League table ==
=== Standings ===
Pos	Team	Pld	W	D	L	GF	GA	GD	Pts	Qualification or relegation
1	Universitario (C)	21	11	5	5	59	44	+15	27	Champions
2	Deportivo Municipal	21	11	4	6	54	39	+15	26	
3	Sport Boys	21	7	9	5	50	44	+6	23	
4	Sucre	21	7	9	5	35	36	−1	23	
5	Alianza Lima	21	8	5	8	51	44	+7	21	
6	Atlético Chalaco	21	6	5	10	40	43	−3	17	
7	Sporting Tabaco	21	7	3	11	55	71	−16	17	
8	Centro Iqueño (R)	21	4	6	11	36	59	−23	14	1947 Segunda División

(C) Champions; (R) Relegated

== Results ==
=== Matches 1–14 ===
Home \ Away	ALI	CHA	IQU	MUN	SBA	TAB	SUC	UNI
Alianza Lima		2–2	7–0	4–1	2–7	5–1	1–1	3–0
Atlético Chalaco	2–1		4–0	2–1	3–1	2–2	1–1	2–5
Centro Iqueño	3–4	0–3		2–1	0–1	3–3	1–1	3–4
Deportivo Municipal	4–0	3–2	3–3		0–2	4–2	1–1	4–2
Sport Boys	3–3	4–4	1–1	2–3		3–2	4–0	4–4
Sporting Tabaco	4–3	5–4	2–3	1–6	3–0		1–2	5–6
Sucre	4–1	1–0	2–0	2–2	1–1	3–1		3–4
Universitario	1–2	2–0	4–1	2–3	1–1	4–1	1–1	

Updated to match(es) played on 1946. Source: Diario El Comercio, La Prensa and Crónica.
Legend: Blue = home team win; Yellow = draw; Red = away team win.

=== Matches 15–21 ===
Home \ Away	ALI	CHA	IQU	MUN	SBA	TAB	SUC	UNI
Alianza Lima		2–0		1–2	1–1		5–2	
Atlético Chalaco			2–2		2–0	3–4	1–2	
Centro Iqueño	2–1			1–4	3–3	4–5		
Deportivo Municipal		1–0				5–6		1–1
Sport Boys				2–1			3–3	4–6
Sporting Tabaco	4–3				1–3			1–4
Sucre			1–2	1–4		1–1		2–1
Universitario	0–0	4–1	3–2					

Updated to match(es) played on 1946. Source: Diario El Comercio, La Prensa and Crónica.
Legend: Blue = home team win; Yellow = draw; Red = away team win.

== Top scorers ==
Rank	Player	Club	Goals
1	(Peru) Valeriano López	Sport Boys	22
2	(Peru) Óscar Herrera	Alianza Lima	19
3	(Peru) Víctor Espinoza	Universitario	18
4	(Peru) Teodoro Fernández	Universitario	14
5	(Peru) Julio García	Sporting Tabaco	13
5	(Peru) Marín Reyna	Sucre	13
5	(Peru) Julio Aparicio	Sucre	13
6	(Peru) Raúl Alva	Deportivo Municipal	10

== See also ==
- 1946 Campeonato de Apertura
- 1946 Peruvian Segunda División
- 1946–I Torneo_Relámpago
- 1946–II Torneo_Relámpago
