= 1954 Peruvian Segunda División =

Peruvian Segunda División
- Season: 1954
- Champions: Unión Callao
- Runner up: KDT Nacional
- Relegated: Unión Carbone
- Matches: 90

The 1954 Peruvian Segunda División, the second division of Peruvian football (soccer), was played by 10 teams. The tournament winner, Unión Callao was promoted to the 1955 Peruvian Primera División.

== Competition format ==
All teams faced each other in a double round-robin format, playing home and away matches. The team that accumulated the highest number of points at the end of the season was automatically crowned champion and promoted to the Peruvian Primera División, while the team with the fewest points was relegated to the Ligas Provinciales de Lima y Callao.

Two points were awarded for a win, one point for a draw, and no points for a loss.

== Teams ==
=== Team changes ===
Promoted to 1954 Primera División	Relegated from 1953 Primera División
▲ Carlos Concha (1st)	▼ Unión Callao (10th)

=== Stadia and locations ===
Team	City
Association Chorrillos	Chorrillos, Lima
Atlético Lusitania	Cercado de Lima
Defensor Arica	Breña, Lima
Jorge Chávez	Callao
Juventud Gloria	Cercado de Lima
KDT Nacional	Callao
Porvenir Miraflores	Miraflores, Lima
Santiago Barranco	Barranco, Lima
Unión Callao	Callao
Unión Carbone	Cercado de Lima

== League table ==
=== Standings ===
Pos	Team	Pld	W	D	L	Pts	Qualification or relegation
1	Unión Callao (C)	18	13	3	2	29	1955 Primera División
2	KDT Nacional	18	11	4	3	26	
3	Atlético Lusitania	18	9	4	5	22	
4	Porvenir Miraflores	18	7	5	6	19	
5	Defensor Arica	18	6	5	7	17	
6	Juventud Gloria	18	7	2	9	16	
7	Association Chorrillos	18	5	5	8	15	
8	Santiago Barranco	18	7	1	10	15	
9	Jorge Chávez	18	6	1	11	13	
10	Unión Carbone (R)	18	2	4	12	8	1955 Liga Provincial de Lima

(C) Champions; (R) Relegated

== Results ==
Home \ Away	ACH	LUS	DAR	JCC	GLO	KDT	POR	SAN	CAL	CAR
Association Chorrillos		—	—	—	—	—	—	—	—	—
Atlético Lusitania	—		—	—	—	—	—	—	—	—
Defensor Arica	—	—		—	—	—	—	—	—	—
Jorge Chávez	—	—	—		—	—	—	—	—	—
Juventud Gloria	—	—	—	—		—	—	—	—	—
KDT Nacional	—	—	—	—	—		—	—	—	—
Porvenir Miraflores	—	—	—	—	—	—		—	—	—
Santiago Barranco	—	—	—	—	—	—	—		—	—
Unión Callao	—	—	—	—	—	—	—	—		—
Unión Carbone	—	—	—	—	—	—	—	—	—	

Updated to match(es) played on 1954. Source: Diario El Comercio, La Prensa and Crónica.
Legend: Blue = home team win; Yellow = draw; Red = away team win.

== Liguilla de Ascenso a Segunda División ==
Chim Pum Callao, as champions of the 1954 Liga Provincial del Callao, and Unión América, as champions of the 1954 Liga Provincial de Lima, were supposed to play a final to determine promotion to the 1955 Segunda División.

16 February 1955	Unión América	2–1	Chim Pum Callao

Unión América earned promotion to the 1955 Segunda División.

== See also ==
- 1954 Peruvian Primera División
- 1954 Ligas Provinciales de Lima y Callao
