= 1955 Peruvian Primera División =

Peruvian Primera División
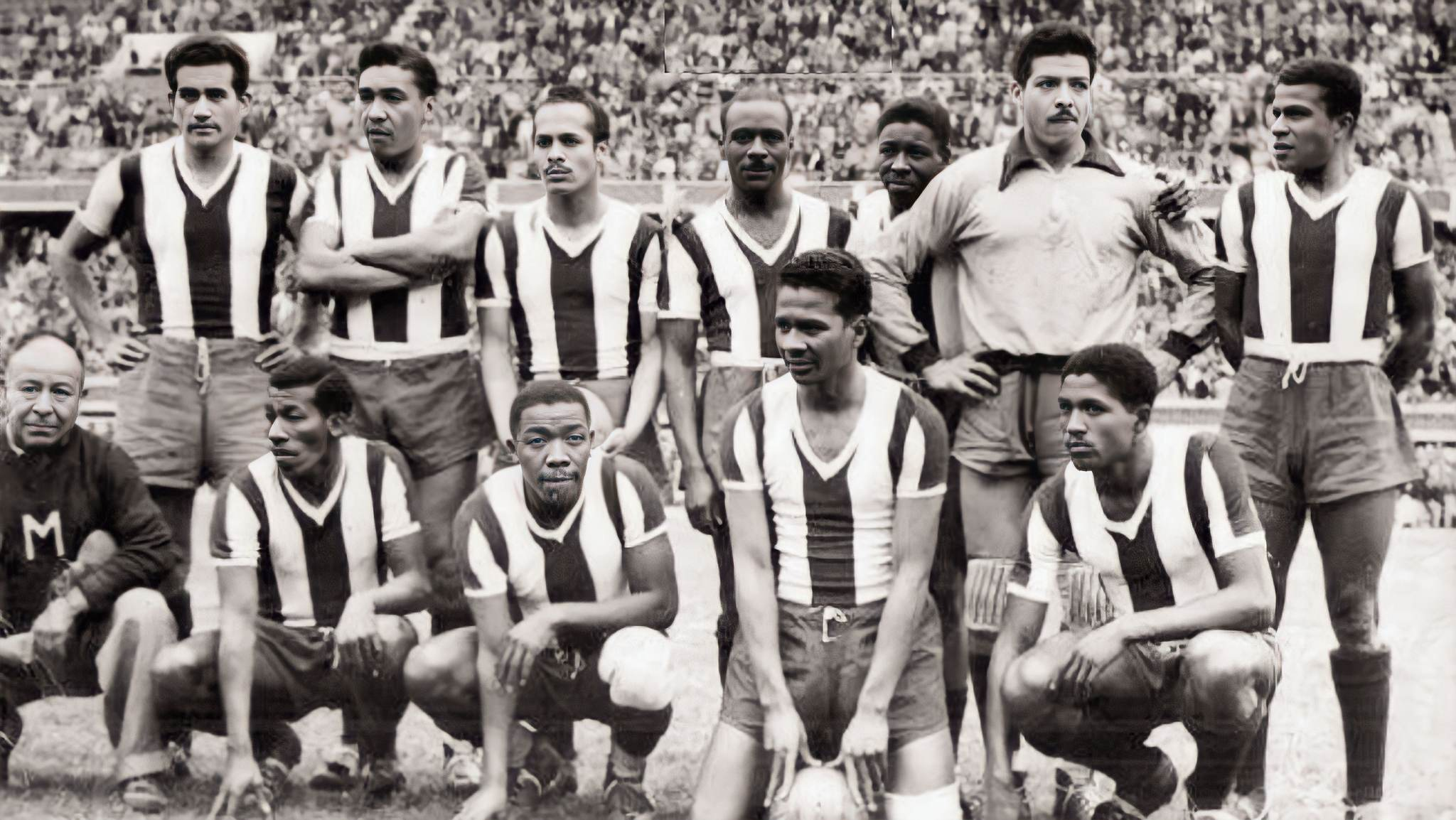
- Lineup of Alianza Lima, the national champions in 1955
- Season: 1955
- Dates: 25 June 1955 – 27 May 1956
- Champions: Alianza Lima (11th title)
- Runner up: Universitario
- Relegated: Unión Callao
- Matches: 91
- Goals: 289 (3.18 per match)
- Top goalscorer: Máximo Mosquera (11 goals)

The 1955 season of the Peruvian Primera División, the top category of Peruvian football, was played by 10 teams. The national champions were Alianza Lima.

Sporting Tabaco change its name to Sporting Cristal for 1956.

== Competition format ==
All teams faced each other in a double round-robin format, playing home and away matches. The team that accumulated the highest number of points at the end of the season was automatically crowned champion, while the team with the fewest points was relegated to the Peruvian Segunda División.

Two points were awarded for a win, one point for a draw, and no points for a loss.

== Teams ==
=== Team changes ===
Promoted from 1954 Segunda División	Relegated from 1954 Primera División
▲ Unión Callao (1st)	▼ Carlos Concha (10th)

=== Stadia locations ===
Team	City	Mannager
Alianza Lima	La Victoria, Lima	(Peru) Adelfo Magallanes
Atlético Chalaco	Callao	(Argentina) Francisco Villegas
Centro Iqueño	Cercado de Lima	(Uruguay) Roberto Scarone
Ciclista Lima	Cercado de Lima	(Peru) Víctor Villavicencio
Deportivo Municipal	Cercado de Lima	(Peru) Juan Valdivieso
Mariscal Sucre	La Victoria, Lima	(Peru) Alfonso Huapaya
Sport Boys	Callao	(Greece) Dan Georgiadis
Sporting Tabaco	Rímac, Lima	(Peru) Víctor Pasache
Unión Callao	Callao	(Peru) Carlos Iturrizaga
Universitario	Breña, Lima	(Peru) Arturo Fernández

== League table ==
=== Standings ===
Pos	Team	Pld	W	D	L	GF	GA	GD	Pts	Qualification or relegation
1	Alianza Lima (C, O)	18	11	3	4	48	21	+27	25	Title play-off
2	Universitario	18	10	5	3	30	19	+11	25	Title play-off
3	Centro Iqueño	18	10	3	5	23	13	+10	23	
4	Atlético Chalaco	18	8	5	5	29	28	+1	21	
5	Sport Boys	18	7	5	6	23	28	−5	19	
6	Ciclista Lima	18	6	5	7	31	30	+1	17	
7	Deportivo Municipal	18	6	5	7	31	32	−1	17	
8	Mariscal Sucre	18	5	5	8	17	24	−7	15	
9	Sporting Tabaco	18	4	3	11	34	44	−10	11	
10	Unión Callao (R)	18	2	3	13	20	47	−27	7	1956 Segunda División

(C) Champions; (O) Play-off winners; (R) Relegated

== Results ==
Home \ Away	ALI	CHA	IQU	CIC	MUN	MSU	SBA	TAB	CAL	UNI
Alianza Lima		5–2	2–1	3–3	5–1	6–1	0–1	2–1	6–0	1–1
Atlético Chalaco	1–4		1–0	2–1	1–1	1–1	1–2	2–2	2–2	1–0
Centro Iqueño	3–1	2–2		0–1	2–1	1–0	3–0	2–1	1–1	0–1
Ciclista Lima	0–2	0–1	0–2		4–1	1–1	2–1	6–3	4–1	0–2
Deportivo Municipal	0–1	4–3	1–2	2–1		0–0	2–2	4–1	4–1	0–1
Mariscal Sucre	2–1	0–1	0–1	3–0	2–1		1–1	2–1	3–1	0–0
Sport Boys	3–1	1–3	1–0	1–1	0–0	1–0		4–2	1–1	2–4
Sporting Tabaco	0–0	1–3	0–2	3–3	3–4	1–0	5–0		1–3	1–3
Unión Callao	0–5	0–1	0–1	1–3	2–4	2–0	0–2	2–4		1–2
Universitario	1–3	2–1	0–0	1–1	1–1	4–1	2–0	2–4	3–2	

Updated to match(es) played on 1955. Source: Diario El Comercio, La Prensa and Crónica.
Legend: Blue = home team win; Yellow = draw; Red = away team win.

== Title play-off ==
27 May 1956
14:00

Alianza Lima	2–1	Universitario
Máximo Mosquera 11'; Valeriano López 43'		4' Segundo Guevara

Estadio Nacional, Lima
Attendance: 43,955
Referee: (Spain) Jesús Lires López

== Torneo Equipos de Reserva ==
Alongside the Primera División championship, the Reserve Teams Tournament was played, featuring the reserve players of top-flight clubs. However, unlike the 1931–1934 period, this competition did not grant any bonus points to the first team.

Universitario were crowned champions after a 5–0 victory over Deportivo Municipal on the final matchday, finishing with a total of 17 points and earning a prize of 25,000 soles.

== Top scorers ==
Rank	Player	Club	Goals
1	(Peru) Máximo Mosquera	Alianza Lima	11
2	(Argentina) Carlos Gambina	Atlético Chalaco	10
2	(Peru) Segundo Guevara	Universitario	10
2	(Paraguay) Porfirio Rolón	Centro Iqueño	10
3	(Peru) Valeriano López	Alianza Lima	9
3	(Peru) Faustino Delgado	Sporting Tabaco	9
4	(Argentina) Gualberto Bianco	Ciclista Lima	8
4	(Peru) Guillermo Barbadillo	Alianza Lima	8

== See also ==
- 1955 Campeonato de Apertura
- 1955 Peruvian Segunda División
