= 1950 Peruvian Segunda División =

Peruvian Segunda División
- Season: 1950
- Dates: 30 September 1950 – 21 January 1951
- Champions: Unión Callao
- Runner up: Association Chorrillos
- Matches: 56
- Goals: 273 (4.88 per match)

The 1950 Peruvian Segunda División, the second division of Peruvian football (soccer), was played by 8 teams. The tournament winner, Unión Callao was promoted to the 1951 Peruvian Primera División.

== Competition format ==
All teams faced each other in a double round-robin format, playing home and away matches. The team that accumulated the highest number of points at the end of the season was automatically crowned champion and promoted to the Peruvian Primera División.

== Teams ==
=== Team changes ===
Promoted from 1949 Liga Regional de Lima y Callao	Promoted to 1950 Primera División
▲ Unión Carbone (1st) ▲ Porvenir Miraflores (2nd)	▲ Jorge Chávez (1st) ▲ Ciclista Lima (2nd)

=== Stadia and locations ===
Team	City
Association Chorrillos	Chorrillos, Lima
Atlético Lusitania	Cercado de Lima
Carlos Concha	Callao
Defensor Arica	Breña, Lima
Porvenir Miraflores	Miraflores, Lima
Santiago Barranco	Barranco, Lima
Unión Callao	Callao
Unión Carbone	Cercado de Lima

== League table ==
=== Standings ===
Pos	Team	Pld	W	D	L	GF	GA	GD	Pts	Qualification or relegation
1	Unión Callao (C)	14	11	2	1	47	18	+29	24	1951 Primera División
2	Association Chorrillos	14	8	4	2	38	24	+14	20	
3	Unión Carbone	14	7	3	4	39	31	+8	17	
4	Defensor Arica	14	6	2	6	49	41	+8	14	
5	Atlético Lusitania	14	5	2	7	23	35	−12	12	
6	Porvenir Miraflores	14	4	2	8	26	38	−12	10	
7	Carlos Concha	14	4	1	9	29	39	−10	9	
8	Santiago Barranco	14	2	2	10	22	46	−24	6	

(C) Champions

== Results ==
Home \ Away	ACH	LUS	CON	DAR	POR	SAN	CRB	UNI
Association Chorrillos		4–2	3–1	3–2	3–2	3–1	4–3	2–2
Atlético Lusitania	2–1		1–3	2–1	2–2	3–1	2–1	1–3
Carlos Concha	0–0	5–0		1–7	2–1	0–1	0–4	1–4
Defensor Arica	2–4	5–2	6–5		2–1	8–2	1–5	4–6
Porvenir Miraflores	2–7	4–2	3–0	1–2		2–1	2–3	0–4
Santiago Barranco	1–1	3–2	1–6	4–4	1–3		2–4	0–2
Unión Carbone	3–2	1–1	4–3	3–3	2–2	4–2		1–3
Unión Callao	1–1	1–2	3–1	2–1	7–1	4–2	5–1	

Updated to match(es) played on 1950. Source: Diario El Comercio, La Prensa and Crónica.
Legend: Blue = home team win; Yellow = draw; Red = away team win.

== See also ==
- 1950 Peruvian Primera División
