= Alejandro Heredia (football manager) =

Peruvian football manager (1929–2024)

Personal information
- Full name: Alejandro Heredia Miranda
- Date of birth: 30 October 1929
- Place of birth: Lima, Peru
- Date of death: 12 July 2024 (aged 94)
- Place of death: Lima, Peru
- Position: Midfielder

Senior career*
Years	Team	Apps	(Gls)
1952	Ciclista Lima		

Managerial career
- 1958–1961: Ciclista Lima
- 1962: KDT Nacional
- 1966: Porvenir Miraflores
- 1966–1967: Universitario (physical trainer)
- 1968: Universitario
- 1968: Deportivo Municipal
- 1969–1970: Peru (assistant)
- 1971: Peru
- 1972: Universitario
- 1972: Peru (assistant)
- 1973–1975: Deportivo Municipal
- 1976: Peru
- 1977: CNI
- 1978: Defensor Lima
- 1979: Coronel Bolognesi
- 1979–1980: CNI
- 1980: Universitario
- 1981: Peru
- 1985: CNI
- 1986: CNI
- * Club domestic league appearances and goals

Alejandro Heredia Miranda (30 October 1929 – 12 July 2024) was a Peruvian football former and manager.

== Biography ==
=== Managerial career ===
Alejandro "El Cholo" Heredia, both a physical trainer and a coach, began his career in the late 1950s managing Ciclista Lima before moving to KDT Nacional in 1962 and then to Universitario de Deportes as the right-hand man of the renowned Peruvian coach Marcos Calderón between 1966 and 1967. However, it was at Deportivo Municipal that he made his mark, winning the 1968 Second Division championship.

In the 1970s, he had the opportunity to join the Peruvian national team under coach Didi at the 1970 World Cup as an assistant coach before becoming head coach in 1971. He would hold this position twice more, in 1976 and 1981.

Returning to Deportivo Municipal between 1973 and 1975, he was involved in several other coaching roles. CNI (1977, 1979-1980 and 1985) with also stints with the Defensor Lima (1978) and the Coronel Bolognesi (1979).

=== Death ===
Alejandro Heredia died in Lima on 12 July 2024.

== Honours ==
Porvenir Miraflores

- Peruvian Segunda División: 1966

Deportivo Municipal

- Peruvian Segunda División: 1968
