= 1952 Peruvian Segunda División =

Peruvian football league season

Peruvian Segunda División
- Season: 1952
- Dates: 26 October 1952 – 20 December 1952
- Champions: Unión Callao
- Runner up: Porvenir Miraflores
- Matches: 45
- Goals: 226 (5.02 per match)
- Top goalscorer: Guevara (8 goals)

The 1952 Peruvian Segunda División, the second division of Peruvian football (soccer), was played by 10 teams. The tournament winner, Unión Callao, was promoted to the 1953 Peruvian Primera División.

== Teams ==
=== Team changes ===
Promoted to 1952 Primera División	Relegated from 1951 Primera División
▲ Association Chorrillos (1st)	▼ Unión Callao (10th)

=== Stadia and locations ===
Team	City
Atlético Lusitania	Cercado de Lima
Carlos Concha	Callao
Defensor Arica	Breña, Lima
Jorge Chávez	Callao
Juventud Gloria	Cercado de Lima
KDT Nacional	Callao
Porvenir Miraflores	Miraflores, Lima
Santiago Barranco	Barranco, Lima
Unión Callao	Callao
Unión Carbone	Cercado de Lima

== League table ==
=== Standings ===
Pos	Team	Pld	W	D	L	GF	GA	GD	Pts	Qualification or relegation
1	Unión Callao (C)	9	8	0	1	38	12	+26	16	1953 Primera División
2	Porvenir Miraflores	9	6	1	2	23	14	+9	13	
3	Santiago Barranco	9	6	0	3	35	26	+9	12	
4	Jorge Chávez	9	4	2	3	27	22	+5	10	
5	Unión Carbone	9	3	3	3	20	20	0	9	
6	Atlético Lusitania	9	3	3	3	18	18	0	9	
7	KDT Nacional	9	4	1	4	16	22	−6	9	
8	Carlos Concha	9	2	2	5	24	28	−4	6	
9	Juventud Gloria	9	2	0	7	16	32	−16	4	
10	Defensor Arica	9	0	2	7	9	33	−24	2	

(C) Champions

== Results ==
Teams play each other once, either home or away. All matches were played in Lima.

Home \ Away	LUS	CON	DAR	JCC	GLO	KDT	POR	SAN	CAL	CRB
Atlético Lusitania		2–2		1–0	4–1	1–3				2–2
Carlos Concha			4–1	2–2	3–5			2–4	1–5	
Defensor Arica	3–3					0–2	0–3			1–1
Jorge Chávez			4–1			2–2	2–4			5–3
Juventud Gloria			3–1	4–5				1–8	0–2	
KDT Nacional		2–4			2–1		0–2		1–7	1–0
Porvenir Miraflores	3–2	2–1			4–2			2–3	1–2	
Santiago Barranco	4–1		6–0	1–4		4–3				
Unión Callao	0–1		7–2	4–3				8–3		
Unión Carbone		5–4			3–0		2–2	4–2	0–3	

Updated to match(es) played on 1952. Source: Diario El Comercio, La Prensa and Crónica.
Legend: Blue = home team win; Yellow = draw; Red = away team win.

== See also ==
- 1952 Peruvian Primera División
