= 1951 Peruvian Primera División =

Peruvian Primera División
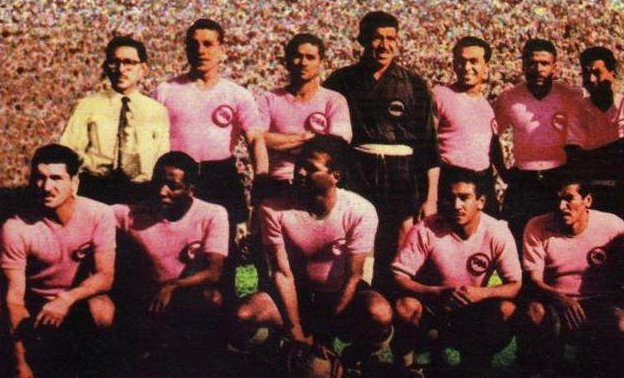
- Season: 1951
- Dates: 30 June 1951 – 18 November 1951
- Champions: Sport Boys (4th title)
- Runner up: Deportivo Municipal
- Relegated: Unión Callao
- Matches: 90
- Goals: 415 (4.61 per match)
- Top goalscorer: Valeriano López (31 goals)

The 1951 season of the Peruvian Primera División, the top category of Peruvian football, was played by 10 teams. The national champions were Sport Boys.

== Competition format ==
All teams faced each other in a double round-robin format, playing home and away matches. The team that accumulated the highest number of points at the end of the season was automatically crowned champion, while the team with the fewest points was relegated to the Peruvian Segunda División.

Two points were awarded for a win, one point for a draw, and no points for a loss.

== Teams ==
=== Team changes ===
Promoted from 1950 Segunda División	Relegated from 1950 Primera División
▲ Unión Callao (1st)	▼ Jorge Chávez (10th)

=== Stadia locations ===
Team	City	Mannager
Alianza Lima	La Victoria, Lima	(Peru) Alejandro González
Atlético Chalaco	Callao	(Peru) José Arana
Centro Iqueño	Cercado de Lima	(Peru) Plácido Galindo
Ciclista Lima	Cercado de Lima	(Argentina) Carlos Aldabe
Deportivo Municipal	Cercado de Lima	(Peru) Juan Valdivieso
Mariscal Sucre	La Victoria, Lima	(Argentina) Ángel Fernández Roca
Sport Boys	Callao	(Peru) Alfonso Huapaya
Sporting Tabaco	Rímac, Lima	(Uruguay) Héctor Castro
Unión Callao	Callao	
Universitario	Cercado de Lima	(Peru) Arturo Fernández

== League table ==
=== Standings ===
Pos	Team	Pld	W	D	L	GF	GA	GD	Pts	Qualification or relegation
1	Sport Boys (C)	18	13	2	3	63	34	+29	28	Champions
2	Deportivo Municipal	18	11	4	3	58	33	+25	26	
3	Mariscal Sucre	18	9	2	7	45	40	+5	20	
4	Alianza Lima	18	8	4	6	46	46	0	20	
5	Ciclista Lima	18	7	5	6	42	40	+2	19	
6	Centro Iqueño	18	7	2	9	29	32	−3	16	
7	Universitario	18	7	2	9	37	42	−5	16	
8	Sporting Tabaco	18	4	6	8	33	43	−10	14	
9	Atlético Chalaco	18	5	2	11	29	53	−24	12	
10	Unión Callao (R)	18	2	5	11	33	52	−19	9	1952 Segunda División

Source: Diario La Crónica
(C) Champions; (R) Relegated

== Results ==
Home \ Away	ALI	CHA	IQU	CIC	MUN	SUC	SBA	TAB	CAL	UNI
Alianza Lima		2–1	2–0	3–1	5–5	4–2	5–2	5–2	4–2	0–2
Atlético Chalaco	4–2		1–4	1–3	1–4	3–2	2–10	3–1	2–1	1–1
Centro Iqueño	1–0	2–0		3–1	0–1	0–1	1–3	4–1	3–1	1–5
Ciclista Lima	3–3	3–1	5–1		2–2	1–2	1–1	2–2	3–2	3–0
Deportivo Municipal	4–2	5–1	2–1	2–3		5–4	2–3	3–1	5–1	4–2
Mariscal Sucre	7–0	4–1	2–0	3–1	1–5		2–6	2–2	2–1	1–4
Sport Boys	1–1	6–2	1–0	4–2	2–1	1–3		4–1	7–1	3–2
Sporting Tabaco	4–2	2–0	2–2	1–4	1–1	1–1	2–3		3–0	2–1
Unión Callao	2–2	1–1	2–2	7–2	2–2	4–3	1–4	3–3		1–3
Universitario	3–4	0–4	2–4	2–2	1–5	1–2	3–2	3–2	2–1	

Updated to match(es) played on 1951. Source: Diario El Comercio, La Prensa and Crónica.
Legend: Blue = home team win; Yellow = draw; Red = away team win.

== Torneo Equipos de Reserva ==
Alongside the Primera División championship, the Reserve Teams Tournament was played, featuring the reserve players of top-flight clubs. However, unlike the 1931–1934 period, this competition did not grant any bonus points to the first team.

=== Standings ===
Pos	Team	Pld	W	D	L	GF	GA	GD	Pts	Qualification or relegation
1	Centro Iqueño	9	6	2	1	21	8	+13	14	Champions
2	Universitario	9	6	1	2	23	8	+15	13	
3	Alianza Lima	9	6	1	2	11	13	−2	13	
4	Mariscal Sucre	9	5	3	1	14	11	+3	13	
5	Atlético Chalaco	9	4	2	3	15	14	+1	10	
6	Unión Callao	9	3	2	4	7	12	−5	8	
7	Sport Boys	9	2	3	4	8	13	−5	7	
8	Sporting Tabaco	9	1	5	3	12	13	−1	7	
9	Ciclista Lima	9	1	2	6	9	16	−7	4	
10	Deportivo Municipal	9	0	1	8	3	15	−12	1	

Source: Diario La Crónica

== Top scorers ==
Rank	Player	Club	Goals
1	(Peru) Valeriano López	Sport Boys	31
2	(Peru) Manuel Rivera	Deportivo Municipal	26
3	(Peru) Roberto Castillo	Alianza Lima	15
4	(Peru) Alberto Terry	Universitario	13
5	(Peru) Guillermo Barbadillo	Sport Boys	12
5	(Peru) José Abán	Mariscal Sucre	12

== See also ==
- 1951 Campeonato de Apertura
- 1951 Peruvian Segunda División
- 1951 Torneo Relámpago
