= 1955 Peruvian Segunda División =

Peruvian Segunda División
- Season: 1955
- Dates: 13 August 1955 – 18 December 1955
- Champions: Carlos Concha
- Runner up: Porvenir Miraflores
- Relegated: Jorge Chávez
- Matches: 90
- Goals: 329 (3.66 per match)
- Top goalscorer: Tulio Quiñones (10)

The 1955 Peruvian Segunda División, the second division of Peruvian football (soccer), was played by 10 teams. The tournament winner, Carlos Concha was promoted to the 1956 Peruvian Primera División.

== Competition format ==
All teams faced each other in a double round-robin format, playing home and away matches. The team that accumulated the highest number of points at the end of the season was automatically crowned champion and promoted to the Peruvian Primera División, while the team with the fewest points was relegated to the Ligas Provinciales de Lima y Callao.

Two points were awarded for a win, one point for a draw, and no points for a loss.

== Teams ==
=== Team changes ===
| Promoted from 1954 Liguilla de Ascenso | Promoted to 1955 Primera División | Relegated from 1954 Primera División | Relegated to 1955 Liga Provincial de Lima |
|---|---|---|---|
| ▲ Unión América (1st) | ▲ Unión Callao (1st) | ▼ Carlos Concha (10th) | ▼ Unión Carbone (10th) |

=== Stadia and locations ===
| Team | City |
|---|---|
| Association Chorrillos | Chorrillos, Lima |
| Atlético Lusitania | Cercado de Lima |
| Carlos Concha | Callao |
| Defensor Arica | Breña, Lima |
| Jorge Chávez | Callao |
| Juventud Gloria | Cercado de Lima |
| KDT Nacional | Callao |
| Porvenir Miraflores | Miraflores, Lima |
| Santiago Barranco | Barranco, Lima |
| Unión América | Cercado de Lima |

== League table ==
=== Standings ===
| Pos | Team | Pld | W | D | L | GF | GA | GD | Pts | Qualification or relegation |
|---|---|---|---|---|---|---|---|---|---|---|
| 1 | Carlos Concha (C) | 18 | 12 | 5 | 1 | 39 | 19 | +20 | 29 | 1956 Primera División |
| 2 | Porvenir Miraflores | 18 | 11 | 5 | 2 | 48 | 23 | +25 | 27 | |
| 3 | Unión América | 18 | 10 | 4 | 4 | 43 | 23 | +20 | 24 | |
| 4 | Atlético Lusitania | 18 | 7 | 3 | 8 | 23 | 22 | +1 | 17 | |
| 5 | Juventud Gloria | 18 | 8 | 1 | 9 | 38 | 39 | −1 | 17 | |
| 6 | Santiago Barranco | 18 | 6 | 3 | 9 | 30 | 37 | −7 | 15 | |
| 7 | KDT Nacional | 18 | 6 | 2 | 10 | 27 | 38 | −11 | 14 | |
| 8 | Defensor Arica | 18 | 4 | 6 | 8 | 26 | 39 | −13 | 14 | |
| 9 | Association Chorrillos | 18 | 5 | 2 | 11 | 26 | 49 | −23 | 12 | |
| 10 | Jorge Chávez (R) | 18 | 3 | 5 | 10 | 29 | 41 | −12 | 11 | 1956 Liga Provincial del Callao |

(C) Champions; (R) Relegated

== Results ==
| Home \ Away | ACH | LUS | CON | DAR | JCC | GLO | KDT | POR | SAN | AME |
|---|---|---|---|---|---|---|---|---|---|---|
| Association Chorrillos | | 2–1 | 0–3 | 1–0 | 7–1 | 3–2 | 3–2 | 1–5 | 1–3 | 2–4 |
| Atlético Lusitania | 1–0 | | 1–1 | 4–1 | 3–0 | W.O. | W.O. | 0–2 | 0–3 | 0–1 |
| Carlos Concha | 3–2 | 1–0 | | 1–0 | 3–1 | 3–1 | 4–1 | 2–1 | 3–1 | 3–1 |
| Defensor Arica | 3–3 | 0–3 | 1–3 | | 2–2 | 1–0 | 0–2 | 1–5 | 4–2 | 2–2 |
| Jorge Chávez | 4–0 | 2–0 | 3–3 | 1–1 | | 3–3 | 1–2 | 1–2 | 5–1 | 0–3 |
| Juventud Gloria | 7–1 | 4–1 | 1–0 | 3–4 | 2–1 | | 3–0 | 1–3 | 3–0 | 0–5 |
| KDT Nacional | 3–1 | 1–1 | 1–2 | 3–1 | 3–2 | 0–3 | | 1–1 | 4–2 | 1–4 |
| Porvenir Miraflores | 0–0 | 0–1 | 2–2 | 2–2 | 4–1 | 4–1 | 2–1 | | 3–2 | 1–1 |
| Santiago Barranco | 3–0 | 1–1 | 1–1 | 1–1 | 1–0 | 1–3 | 3–0 | 3–6 | | 1–0 |
| Unión América | 4–0 | 2–1 | 1–1 | 1–2 | 1–1 | 7–1 | 3–2 | 1–4 | 2–1 | |

Updated to match(es) played on 1955. Source: Diario El Comercio, La Prensa and Crónica.
Legend: Blue = home team win; Yellow = draw; Red = away team win.

== Liguilla de Ascenso a Segunda División ==
Unidad Vecinal No. 3, as champions of the 1955 Liga Provincial del Callao, and Mariscal Castilla, as champions of the 1955 Liga Provincial de Lima, were supposed to play a final to determine promotion to the 1956 Segunda División.

| 3 May 1956 | Unidad Vecinal Nº3 | 1–0 | Mariscal Castilla |

Unidad Vecinal No. 3 earned promotion to the 1956 Segunda División.

== See also ==
- 1955 Peruvian Primera División
