= 1972 Peruvian Segunda División =

Peruvian Segunda División
- Season: 1972
- Champions: Atlético Chalaco
- Runner up: Porvenir Miraflores
- Relegated: Atlético Sicaya
- Matches: 111

The 1972 Peruvian Segunda División, the second division of Peruvian football (soccer), was played by 11 teams. The tournament winner, Atlético Chalaco was promoted to the 1973 Torneo Descentralizado.

== Competition format ==
All teams faced each other in a double round-robin format, playing home and away matches. The team that accumulated the highest number of points at the end of the season was automatically crowned champion and promoted to the Peruvian Primera División, while the team with the fewest points was relegated to the Ligas Provinciales de Lima y Callao.

Two points were awarded for a win, one point for a draw, and no points for a loss.

== Teams ==
=== Team changes ===
Promoted from 1971 Liguilla de Ascenso	Promoted to 1972 Primera División	Relegated from 1971 Primera División	Relegated to 1972 Liga Provincial de Lima
▲ Deportivo Bancoper (1st)	▲ Deportivo SIMA (1st)	▼ADO (14th) ▼ Porvenir Miraflores (16th)	▼ Estudiantes San Roberto (10th)

=== Stadia and locations ===
Team	City
ADO	Callao
Atlético Chalaco	Callao
Atlético Sicaya	Callao
Carlos Concha	Callao
Centro Iqueño	Cercado de Lima
Ciclista Lima	Cercado de Lima
Deportivo Bancoper	Cercado de Lima
Independiente Sacachispas	Breña, Lima
Mariscal Sucre	La Victoria, Lima
Porvenir Miraflores	Miraflores, Lima
Racing San Isidro	San Isidro, Lima

== League table ==
=== Standings ===
Pos	Team	Pld	W	D	L	Pts	Qualification or relegation
1	Atlético Chalaco (C)	20	17	3	0	37	1973 Primera División
2	Porvenir Miraflores	20	14	6	0	34	
3	Mariscal Sucre	20	10	5	5	25	
4	Centro Iqueño	20	9	4	7	22	
5	Carlos Concha	20	7	5	8	19	
6	Ciclista Lima	20	7	3	10	17	
7	Independiente Sacachispas	20	5	6	9	16	
8	Deportivo Bancoper	20	5	5	10	15	
9	Racing San Isidro	20	4	5	11	13	
10	ADO (O)	20	3	5	12	11	Relegation play-off
11	Atlético Sicaya (R)	20	4	3	13	11	Relegation play-off

(C) Champions; (O) Play-off winners; (R) Relegated

== Results ==
Teams play each other once, either home or away. All matches were played in Lima and Callao.

Home \ Away	ADO	CHA	SIC	CON	CEN	CIC	BAN	IND	SUC	POR	RAC
ADO		—	—	—	—	—	—	—	—	—	—
Atlético Chalaco	—		—	—	—	—	—	—	—	—	2–1
Atlético Sicaya	—	—		—	—	—	—	—	—	—	—
Carlos Concha	—	—	—		—	—	—	—	—	—	—
Centro Iqueño	—	—	—	—		—	—	—	—	—	—
Ciclista Lima	—	—	—	—	—		—	—	—	—	—
Deportivo Bancoper	—	—	—	—	—	—		—	—	—	—
Independiente Sacachispas	—	—	—	—	—	—	—		—	—	—
Mariscal Sucre	—	—	—	—	—	—	—	—		—	—
Porvenir Miraflores	1–1	—	—	—	—	—	—	—	—		—
Racing San Isidro	—	—	—	—	—	—	—	—	—	—	

Updated to match(es) played on 1972. Source: Diario El Comercio, La Prensa and Crónica.
Legend: Blue = home team win; Yellow = draw; Red = away team win.

== Relegation play-off ==
18 November 1972

Atlético Sicaya	0–0	ADO

Estadio San Martín de Porres, Lima
21 November 1972

ADO	2–0	Atlético Sicaya

Estadio San Martín de Porres, Lima

== Divisional movements ==
In April 1973, the Peruvian Football Federation ordered the elimination of the Second Division, so all the teams that maintained the category, in addition to Defensor Arica, which was relegated from 1972 Torneo Descentralizado, began to play in their respective league of origin.

=== Standings ===
Pos	Team	Pld	W	D	L	Pts	Qualification or relegation
1	Atlético Chalaco (C)	20	17	3	0	37	1973 Primera División
2	Porvenir Miraflores	20	14	6	0	34	1973 Liga de los Balnearios del Sur
3	Mariscal Sucre	20	10	5	5	25	1973 Liga Provincial de Lima
4	Centro Iqueño	20	9	4	7	22	1973 Liga Provincial de Lima
5	Carlos Concha	20	7	5	8	19	1973 Liga Provincial del Callao
6	Ciclista Lima	20	7	3	10	17	1973 Liga Provincial de Lima
7	Independiente Sacachispas	20	5	6	9	16	1973 Liga Provincial de Lima
8	Deportivo Bancoper	20	5	5	10	15	1973 Liga Distrital de San Isidro
9	Racing San Isidro	20	4	5	11	13	1973 Liga Distrital de San Isidro
10	ADO	20	3	5	12	11	1973 Liga Provincial del Callao
11	Atlético Sicaya	20	4	3	13	11	1973 Liga Provincial del Callao

(C) Champions

== 1972 Hexagonal de Ascenso ==
The board of the Peruvian Football Federation ordered the elimination of the Segunda División promotion tournament.

It was also established that the champion of the Hexagonal de Ascenso would qualify for the Octogonal de Ascenso of Region 13 (Metropolitan Lima and Callao) of the 1973 Copa Perú, which granted promotion to the Primera División for the 1974 season.

This qualification would be granted only if the champion club of the hexagonal finished among the top six teams of the 1973 First Division tournament of its league of origin.

=== Standings ===
Pos	Team	Pld	W	D	L	GF	GA	GD	Pts	Qualification	CIT	GRU	USM	ACH	REL	MEL
1	CITSA	5	3	2	0	12	5	+7	8	1973 Octogonal de Ascenso		1–1		2–1	3–0	
2	Grumete Medina	5	3	2	0	9	3	+6	8				1–1	2–0		
3	Universidad San Marcos	5	1	4	0	7	4	+3	6		2–2			4–1	0–0	
4	Association Chorrillos	5	2	0	3	6	8	−2	4						1–0	3–0
5	Atlético Relámpago	5	1	1	3	1	6	−5	3			0–2				1–0
6	Deportivo Melzi	5	0	1	4	2	11	−9	1		1–4	1–3	0–0			

Source: Diario El Comercio, La Prensa and Crónica.
Legend: Blue = home team win; Yellow = draw; Red = away team win.

=== Title play-off ===
Team 1	Score	Team 2
CITSA	1–0	Grumete Medina

CITSA earned qualification for the 1973 Octogonal de Ascenso.

== See also ==
- 1972 Torneo Descentralizado
- 1972 Copa Perú
- 1972 Hexagonal de Ascenso
