= Torneo Relámpago (Peru) =

Peruvian football competition

- Founded: 1943
- Folded: 1965; 61 years ago
- Region: Peru

The Torneo Relámpago, also called the Gran Torneo Relámpago or Relámpago, was a Peruvian football competition created and then organized by the Círculo de Periodistas Deportivos del Perú. It was played from 1943 until 1965.

The tournament was played among the clubs of the Peruvian Primera División and took place in a single day, with each match lasting between 30 minutes and, if the tie persisted, the winner was determined by the team with the most corner kicks in their favor or, failing that, by the team that had committed fewer fouls. All the matches were played at the Estadio Nacional in Lima.

== Champions ==
=== Primera División ===
- (In bracket, title count):

Ed.	Season	Champion	Score	Runner-up
1	1943	Sport Boys (1)	0–0 (3–2 c.)^{[A]}	Deportivo Municipal
2	1944	Deportivo Municipal (1)	5–1	Centro Iqueño
3	1945	Atlético Chalaco (1)	1–0	Universitario
4	1946–I	Deportivo Municipal (2)	4–3	Centro Iqueño
5	1946–II	Atlético Chalaco (2)	2–1	Sport Boys
6	1947–I	Alianza Lima (1)	2–0	Deportivo Municipal
7	1947–II	Atlético Chalaco (3)	1–0	Sport Boys
8	1948	Sporting Tabaco (1)	0–0 (2–1 c.)^{[B]}	Deportivo Municipal
9	1949	Sport Boys (2)	5–2	Atlético Chalaco
10	1950	Sport Boys (3)	3–1	Universitario
11	1951	Deportivo Municipal (3)	1–0	Atlético Chalaco
12	1952	Centro Iqueño (1)	0–0 (4–1 c.)	Deportivo Municipal
13	1953	Centro Iqueño (2)	3–1	Mariscal Sucre
14	1954	Alianza Lima (2)	2–1	Mariscal Sucre
16	1956	Sporting Cristal (1)	2–0	Sport Boys
17	1957	Ciclista Lima	–	
18	1958	Ciclista Lima	2–0	Mariscal Castilla
19	1959	Sporting Cristal	–	
20	1960	Universitario (1)	1–0	Deportivo Municipal
21	1961	Centro Iqueño	3–0	Sporting Cristal

A. Sport Boys won because they had more corner kicks in their favor during the match against Deportivo Municipal.
B. Sporting Tabaco won because they had more corner kicks in their favor during the match against Deportivo Municipal.

=== Segunda División ===
- (In bracket, title count):

Season	Champion	Score	Runner-up
1960	Carlos Concha (1)	1–1 (4–3 c.)	Defensor Arica
1961	Juventud Gloria (1)	3–0	Mariscal Castilla
1964	Mariscal Sucre (1)	1–0	Unión América
1965	Porvenir Miraflores (1)	3–2	Íntimos de La Legua

== Titles by club ==
Rank	Club	Winners	Runners-up	Winning years	Runners-up years
1	Deportivo Municipal	3	4	1944, 1946–I, 1951	1943, 1947–I, 1948, 1952
1	Sport Boys	3	3	1943, 1949, 1950	1946–II, 1947–II, 1956
1	Atlético Chalaco	3	2	1945, 1946–II, 1947–II	1949, 1951
1	Centro Iqueño	3	2	1952, 1953, 1961	1944, 1946–I
2	Sporting Cristal	2	1	1956, 1959	1961
2	Alianza Lima	2	—	1947–I, 1954	—
2	Ciclista Lima	2	—	1957, 1958	—
3	Universitario	1	2	1960	1945, 1950
3	Sporting Tabaco	1	—	1948	—

== 1943 Torneo Relámpago ==
=== Quarterfinals ===
Team 1	Score	Team 2
Deportivo Municipal	1–1 (4–2 F)	Sporting Tabaco
Centro Iqueño	1–0	Universitario
Alianza Lima	1–0	Telmo Carbajo
Sport Boys	1–0	Atlético Chalaco

=== Semifinals ===
Team 1	Score	Team 2
Deportivo Municipal	0–0 (1–0 c.)	Centro Iqueño
Sport Boys	2–0	Alianza Lima

=== Final ===
Team 1	Score	Team 2
Sport Boys	0–0 (3–2 c.)	Deportivo Municipal

== 1944 Torneo Relámpago ==
The tournament was played on July 9, 1944.

=== Quarterfinals ===
Team 1	Score	Team 2
Centro Iqueño	1–0	Alianza Lima
Sport Boys	3–1	Sucre
Universitario	1–0	Sporting Tabaco
Deportivo Municipal	2–1	Atlético Chalaco

=== Semifinals ===
Team 1	Score	Team 2
Deportivo Municipal	0–0 (4–0 c.)	Sport Boys
Centro Iqueño	0–0 (2–1 c.)	Universitario

=== Final ===
Team 1	Score	Team 2
Deportivo Municipal	5–1	Centro Iqueño

== 1945 Torneo Relámpago ==
=== Quarterfinals ===
Team 1	Score	Team 2
Deportivo Municipal	0–1	Atlético Chalaco
Centro Iqueño	1–0	Sucre
Universitario	0–0 (3–1 c.)	Sport Boys
Alianza Lima	0–0 (1–2 c.)	Sporting Tabaco

=== Semifinals ===
Team 1	Score	Team 2
Atlético Chalaco	3–0	Centro Iqueño
Universitario	2–0	Sporting Tabaco

=== Final ===
Team 1	Score	Team 2
Atlético Chalaco	1–0	Universitario

== 1946–I Torneo Relámpago ==
The tournament was played on May 12, 1946.

=== Quarterfinals ===
Team 1	Score	Team 2
Atlético Chalaco	0–1	Centro Iqueño
Sport Boys	3–2	Alianza Lima
Universitario	1–0	Sporting Tabaco
Deportivo Municipal	6–0	Sucre

=== Semifinals ===
Team 1	Score	Team 2
Deportivo Municipal	1–0	Universitario
Centro Iqueño	2–0	Sport Boys

=== Final ===
Team 1	Score	Team 2
Deportivo Municipal	4–3	Centro Iqueño

== 1946–II Torneo Relámpago ==
The tournament was played on October 20, 1946.

=== Quarterfinals ===
Team 1	Score	Team 2
Sporting Tabaco	0–0 (3–2 c.)	Sucre
Sport Boys	0–0 (6–5 c.)	Alianza Lima
Atlético Chalaco	2–1	Deportivo Municipal
Universitario	2–0	Centro Iqueño

=== Semifinals ===
Team 1	Score	Team 2
Sport Boys	1–0	Sporting Tabaco
Atlético Chalaco	1–0	Universitario

=== Final ===
Team 1	Score	Team 2
Atlético Chalaco	2–1	Sport Boys

== 1947–I Torneo Relámpago ==
The tournament was played on May 11, 1947.

=== Quarterfinals ===
Team 1	Score	Team 2
Sucre	4–0	Ciclista Lima
Deportivo Municipal	1–0	Atlético Chalaco
Sport Boys	0–2	Alianza Lima
Sporting Tabaco	0–0 (5–2 F)	Universitario

=== Semifinals ===
Team 1	Score	Team 2
Deportivo Municipal	2–1	Sucre
Alianza Lima	2–0	Sporting Tabaco

=== Final ===
Team 1	Score	Team 2
Alianza Lima	2–0	Deportivo Municipal

== 1947–II Torneo Relámpago ==
The tournament was played on November 2, 1947.

=== Quarterfinals ===
Team 1	Score	Team 2
Sucre	1–0	Deportivo Municipal
Sport Boys	1–0	Ciclista Lima
Sporting Tabaco	0–2	Atlético Chalaco
Universitario	0–0 (2–7 c.)	Alianza Lima

=== Semifinals ===
Team 1	Score	Team 2
Sport Boys	2–1	Alianza Lima
Atlético Chalaco	2–0	Sucre

=== Final ===
Team 1	Score	Team 2
Atlético Chalaco	1–0	Sport Boys

== 1948 Torneo Relámpago ==
The tournament was played on December 8, 1948. Universitario was eliminated by drawing lots.

=== Quarterfinals ===
Team 1	Score	Team 2
Atlético Chalaco	0–1	Deportivo Municipal
Alianza Lima	1–0	Sucre
Sport Boys	1–0	Ciclista Lima
Sporting Tabaco	1–1 (1–0 c.)	Jorge Chávez

=== Semifinals ===
Team 1	Score	Team 2
Deportivo Municipal	2–1	Alianza Lima
Sporting Tabaco	2–0	Sport Boys

=== Final ===
Team 1	Score	Team 2
Sporting Tabaco	0–0 (2–1 c.)	Deportivo Municipal

== 1949 Torneo Relámpago ==
The tournament was played on June 24, 1949.

=== Quarterfinals ===
Team 1	Score	Team 2
Universitario	0–0 (0–1 c.)	Colegio Guadalupe
Alianza Lima	1–3	Sport Boys
Sucre	2–1	Sporting Tabaco
Atlético Chalaco	3–0	Defensor La Paz

=== Semifinals ===
Team 1	Score	Team 2
Sport Boys	1–0	Colegio Guadalupe
Atlético Chalaco	1–0	Sucre

=== Final ===
Team 1	Score	Team 2
Sport Boys	5–2	Atlético Chalaco

== 1950 Torneo Relámpago ==
The tournament was played on July 16, 1950.

=== First Round ===
Team 1	Score	Team 2
Sucre	2–1	Deportivo Municipal
Atlético Chalaco	1–0	Jorge Chávez

=== Second Round ===
Team 1	Score	Team 2
Sucre	2–0	Atlético Chalaco
Universitario	1–0	Alianza Lima
Sport Boys	3–0	Ciclista Lima
Centro Iqueño	0–0	Sporting Tabaco

=== Semifinals ===
Team 1	Score	Team 2
Universitario	1–0	Sucre
Sport Boys	0–0	Centro Iqueño

=== Final ===
Team 1	Score	Team 2
Sport Boys	3–1	Universitario

== 1951 Torneo Relámpago ==
The tournament was played on June 19, 1951.

=== First Round ===
Team 1	Score	Team 2
Unión Callao	0–0 (2–1 c.)	Sucre
Centro Iqueño	0–0 (3–1 c.)	Ciclista Lima

=== Second Round ===
Team 1	Score	Team 2
Universitario	1–0	Alianza Lima
Atlético Chalaco	3–1	Sporting Tabaco
Deportivo Municipal	2–0	Unión Callao
Centro Iqueño	3–0 (5–4 c.)	Sport Boys

=== Semifinals ===
Team 1	Score	Team 2
Universitario	0–3	Deportivo Municipal
Atlético Chalaco	1–0	Centro Iqueño

=== Final ===
Team 1	Score	Team 2
Deportivo Municipal	1–0	Atlético Chalaco

== 1952 Torneo Relámpago ==
The tournament was played on August 3, 1952.

=== First Round ===
Team 1	Score	Team 2
Sporting Tabaco	2–0	Association Chorrillos
Centro Iqueño	0–0 (7–3 F)	Atlético Chalaco

=== Second Round ===
Team 1	Score	Team 2
Deportivo Municipal	0–0 (16–7 F)	Sporting Tabaco
Ciclista Lima	2–2 (3–2 c.)	Universitario
Sport Boys	1–0	Mariscal Sucre
Centro Iqueño	3–0	Alianza Lima

=== Semifinals ===
Team 1	Score	Team 2
Ciclista Lima	1–3	Deportivo Municipal
Sport Boys	0–0 (2–4 c.)	Centro Iqueño

=== Final ===
Team 1	Score	Team 2
Centro Iqueño	0–0 (4–1 c.)	Deportivo Municipal

== 1953 Torneo Relámpago ==
The tournament was played on January 17, 1953.

=== First Round ===
Team 1	Score	Team 2
Deportivo Municipal	2–1	Atlético Chalaco
Universitario	1–0	Association Chorrillos

=== Second Round ===
Team 1	Score	Team 2
Deportivo Municipal	1–0	Alianza Lima
Mariscal Sucre	3–2	Sporting Tabaco
Centro Iqueño	1–0	Ciclista Lima
Universitario	0–0 (6–1 F)	Sport Boys

=== Semifinals ===
Team 1	Score	Team 2
Mariscal Sucre	0–0 (2–1 c.)	Deportivo Municipal
Centro Iqueño	1–0 )	Universitario

=== Final ===
Team 1	Score	Team 2
Centro Iqueño	3–1	Mariscal Sucre

== 1956 Torneo Relámpago ==
=== First Round ===
Team 1	Score	Team 2
Ciclista Lima	1–0	Deportivo Municipal
Mariscal Sucre	1–0	Carlos Concha

=== Second Round ===
Team 1	Score	Team 2
Universitario	3–1	Ciclista Lima
Sporting Cristal	1–0	Centro Iqueño
Sport Boys	1–0	Atlético Chalaco
Alianza Lima	1–0	Mariscal Sucre

=== Semifinals ===
Team 1	Score	Team 2
Sporting Cristal	1–0	Universitario
Sport Boys	3–0	Alianza Lima

=== Final ===
Team 1	Score	Team 2
Sporting Cristal	2–0	Sport Boys

== 1960 Torneo Relámpago (Segunda División) ==
Prior to the start of the 1960 Peruvian Segunda División season, it was decided that the Torneo Relámpago would be held on May 15, 1960, organized by the Círculo de Periodistas Deportivos del Perú. The tournament featured clubs from the Peruvian Segunda División and was played over a single day, with each match lasting 30 minutes. In the event of a draw, the winner was determined by the team with the most corner kicks in its favor or, if still level, by the team that had committed fewer fouls.

=== First Round ===
Team 1	Score	Team 2
Carlos Concha	2–0	Juventud Gloria
Alianza Chorrillos	0–0 (1–0 c.)	Porvenir Miraflores
Unión América	1–0	Defensor Lima
Unidad Vecinal Nº3	1–0	KDT Nacional
Defensor Arica	2–0	Santiago Barranco

=== Quarterfinals ===
Team 1	Score	Team 2
Alianza Chorrillos	0–0 (1–0 c.)	Unión América
Carlos Concha	1–0	Unidad Vecinal Nº3

Defensor Arica advanced to the semifinal by draw.

=== Semifinal ===
Team 1	Score	Team 2
Defensor Arica	2–1	Alianza Chorrillos

Carlos Concha advanced to the final by draw.

=== Final ===
Team 1	Score	Team 2
Carlos Concha	1–1 (4–3 c.)	Defensor Arica

== 1961 Torneo Relámpago (Segunda División) ==
Following the 1961 Peruvian Segunda División season, it was decided that the Torneo Relámpago would be held on November 1, 1961. The competition was organized by the ACF, the Círculo de Periodistas Deportivos del Perú, and the Asociación de Arbitros, in support of the Navidad del Niño Peruano charity initiative.

The tournament featured clubs from the Peruvian Segunda División and was played over a single day, with each match lasting 30 minutes, while the final was played over 40 minutes without a halftime break. In the event of a draw, the winner was determined by the team with the most corner kicks awarded in its favor or, if still level, by the team that had committed fewer fouls.

The entire tournament was played at the Estadio Fray Martín de Porres.

=== First Round ===
Team 1	Score	Team 2
Carlos Concha	0–0 (3–1 c.)	Unión América
Unidad Vecinal Nº3'	0–1	Association Chorrillos
Mariscal Castilla	1–1 (4–2 F)	Santiago Barranco
KDT Nacional	1–2	Juventud Gloria
Defensor Arica	3–1	Porvenir Miraflores

=== Quarterfinals ===
Team 1	Score	Team 2
Defensor Arica	1–0	Carlos Concha
Juventud Gloria	0–0 (2–0 c.)	Association Chorrillos

Mariscal Castilla advanced to the semifinal by draw.

=== Semifinal ===
Team 1	Score	Team 2
Mariscal Castilla	1–0	Defensor Arica

Juventud Gloria advanced to the final by draw.

=== Final ===
Team 1	Score	Team 2
Juventud Gloria	3–0	Mariscal Castilla

== 1964 Torneo Relámpago (Segunda División) ==
Prior to the start of the 1964 season, a short-format (lightning) tournament was held, featuring all ten clubs competing in the Second Division. Mariscal Sucre were crowned champions after defeating Unión América 1–0 in the final.

The entire tournament was played at the Estadio Fray Martín de Porres.

=== Quarterfinals ===
Team 1	Score	Team 2
Atlético Chalaco	1–1 (3–1 c.)	ADO
Mariscal Sucre	0–0 (3–2 c.)	Defensor Arica

=== Semifinal ===
Team 1	Score	Team 2
Unión América	1–1 (3–1 c.)	Atlético Lusitania
Mariscal Sucre	1–1 (3–1 c.)	Atlético Chalaco

=== Final ===
Team 1	Score	Team 2
Mariscal Sucre	1–0	Unión América

== 1965 Torneo Relámpago (Segunda División) ==
Prior to the start of the 1965 season, a short-format (lightning) tournament was held, featuring all ten clubs competing in the Second Division. Porvenir Miraflores were crowned champions after defeating Íntimos de La Legua 3–2 in the final.

The tournament was played on August 9, 1965, with all matches held at the Estadio Fray Martín de Porres.

=== First round ===
Team 1	Score	Team 2
Atlético Chalaco	3–0	KDT Nacional
Mariscal Sucre	0–0 (2–1 c.)	Juventud Gloria

=== Quarterfinals ===
Team 1	Score	Team 2
Mariscal Sucre	2–1	Atlético Chalaco
Íntimos de La Legua	2–1	Unión América
ADO	0–0 (F)	Atlético Lusitania
Porvenir Miraflores	1–0	Atlético Sicaya

=== Semifinal ===
Team 1	Score	Team 2
Íntimos de La Legua	1–1 (2–0 c.)	Mariscal Sucre
Porvenir Miraflores	1–0	ADO

=== Final ===
Team 1	Score	Team 2
Porvenir Miraflores	3–2	Íntimos de La Legua

== See also ==
- Campeonato de Apertura (Perú)
