= Segundo Castillo =

Segundo Castillo may refer to:

- Segundo Castillo (footballer, born 1913) (1913–1993), Peruvian football midfielder
- Segundo Castillo (footballer, born 1982), Ecuadorian football defensive midfielder and coach
