= 1970 Peruvian Segunda División =

Peruvian Segunda División
- Season: 1970
- Champions: ADO
- Relegated: Huracán San Isidro; KDT Nacional

The 1970 Peruvian Segunda División, the second division of Peruvian football (soccer), was played by 10 teams. The tournament winner, ADO was promoted to the 1971 Torneo Descentralizado.

== Teams ==
=== Team changes ===
Promoted from 1969 Liguilla de Ascenso	Promoted to 1970 Primera División	Relegated from 1969 Primera División	Relegated to 1970 Liga Provincial de Lima
▲ Estudiantes San Roberto (1st)	▲ Deportivo SIMA (1st)	▼ Centro Iqueño (13th) ▼KDT Nacional (14th)	▼ Juventud Gloria (10th)

=== Stadia and locations ===
Team	City
ADO	Callao
Atlético Sicaya	Callao
Carlos Concha	Callao
Centro Iqueño	Cercado de Lima
Ciclista Lima	Cercado de Lima
Estudiantes San Roberto	Cercado de Lima
Huracán San Isidro	San Isidro, Lima
Independiente Sacachispas	Breña, Lima
KDT Nacional	Callao
Mariscal Sucre	La Victoria, Lima
Racing San Isidro	San Isidro, Lima

== League table ==
=== Standings ===
Pos	Team	Pld	W	D	L	GF	GA	GD	Pts	Qualification or relegation
1	ADO	0	0	0	0	0	0	0	0	1971 Torneo Descentralizado
2	Centro Iqueño	0	0	0	0	0	0	0	0	
3	Mariscal Sucre	0	0	0	0	0	0	0	0	
4	Carlos Concha	0	0	0	0	0	0	0	0	
5	Ciclista Lima	0	0	0	0	0	0	0	0	
6	Independiente Sacachispas	0	0	0	0	0	0	0	0	
7	Racing San Isidro	0	0	0	0	0	0	0	0	
8	Atlético Sicaya	0	0	0	0	0	0	0	0	
9	Estudiantes San Roberto	0	0	0	0	0	0	0	0	
10	Huracán San Isidro	0	0	0	0	0	0	0	0	1971 Liga Distrital de San Isidro
11	KDT Nacional	0	0	0	0	0	0	0	0	1971 Liga Provincial del Callao

== Results ==
Home \ Away	ADO	SIC	CAR	CEN	CIC	EST	HSI	IND	KDT	SUC	RAC
ADO		—	—	—	—	—	—	—	—	—	—
Atlético Sicaya	—		—	—	—	—	—	—	—	—	—
Carlos Concha	—	—		—	—	—	—	—	—	—	—
Centro Iqueño	—	—	—		—	—	—	—	—	—	—
Ciclista Lima	—	—	—	—		—	—	—	—	—	—
Estudiantes San Roberto	—	—	—	—	—		—	—	—	—	—
Huracán San Isidro	—	—	—	—	—	—		—	—	—	—
Independiente Sacachispas	—	—	—	—	—	—	—		—	—	—
KDT Nacional	—	—	—	—	—	—	—	—		—	—
Mariscal Sucre	—	—	—	—	—	—	—	—	—		—
Racing San Isidro	—	—	—	—	—	—	—	—	—	—	

Updated to match(es) played on 1970. Source: Diario El Comercio, La Prensa and Crónica.
Legend: Blue = home team win; Yellow = draw; Red = away team win.

== See also ==
- 1970 Torneo Descentralizado
- 1970 Copa Perú
