= 1946 Peruvian Segunda División =

Peruvian Segunda División
- Season: 1946
- Dates: 2 November 1946 – 5 January 1947
- Champions: Ciclista Lima
- Relegated: Progresista Apurímac
- Matches: 28
- Goals: 107 (3.82 per match)
- Top goalscorer: Juan Anglas; Abraham Hidalgo; Burga; Raúl Gordillo (3 goals each)

The 1946 Peruvian Segunda División, the second division of Peruvian football (soccer), was played by 8 teams. The tournament winner, Ciclista Lima was promoted to the 1947 Peruvian Primera División.

== Teams ==
=== Team changes ===
Promoted from
1945 Liga Regional de Lima y Callao
▲ Unión Callao (1st)
▲ Association Chorrillos (1st)

=== Stadia and locations ===
Team	City
Association Chorrillos	Chorrillos, Lima
Atlético Lusitania	Cercado de Lima
Ciclista Lima	Cercado de Lima
Jorge Chávez	Callao
Progresista Apurímac	Callao
Santiago Barranco	Barranco, Lima
Telmo Carbajo	Callao
Unión Callao	Callao

== League table ==
=== Standings ===
Pos	Team	Pld	W	D	L	GF	GA	GD	Pts	Qualification or relegation
1	Ciclista Lima (C)	7	5	1	1	16	11	+5	11	1947 Primera División
2	Unión Callao	7	4	2	1	14	7	+7	10	
3	Atlético Lusitania	7	3	3	1	10	5	+5	9	
4	Jorge Chávez	7	3	2	2	18	16	+2	8	
5	Association Chorrillos	7	3	2	2	15	14	+1	8	
6	Telmo Carbajo	7	2	0	5	15	20	−5	4	
7	Santiago Barranco (O)	7	1	1	5	8	15	−7	3	Relegation play-off
8	Progresista Apurímac (R)	7	0	3	4	11	19	−8	3	Relegation play-off

(C) Champions; (O) Play-off winners; (R) Relegated

== Results ==
Teams play each other once, either home or away. All matches were played in Lima.

Home \ Away	ASS	LUS	CIC	JCC	PRO	SAN	TEL	UNI
Association Chorrillos			3–4	2–5		4–1		
Atlético Lusitania	0–0		0–0	3–1			2–1	
Ciclista Lima					5–2	3–2	2–1	1–0
Jorge Chávez			3–1				2–4	2–2
Progresista Apurímac	0–1	1–1		4–4				0–1
Santiago Barranco		0–3		0–1	2–2			
Telmo Carbajo	2–3				5–2	1–3		
Unión Callao	2–2	2–1				1–0	6–1	

Updated to match(es) played on unknown. Source: Diario El Comercio, La Prensa and Crónica.
Legend: Blue = home team win; Yellow = draw; Red = away team win.

== Relegation playoff ==
26 April 1947	Santiago Barranco	7–0	Progresista Apurímac

== See also ==
- 1946 Peruvian Primera División
