= Máximo Mosquera =

Peruvian footballer (1928-2016)

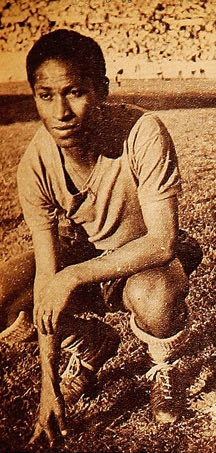

Personal information
- Full name: Máximo Mosquera Zegarra
- Date of birth: 8 January 1928
- Place of birth: Chincha Alta, Peru
- Date of death: 27 July 2016 (aged 88)
- Place of death: Lima, Peru
- Position: Striker

Senior career*
| Years | Team | Apps | (Gls) |
| 1943–1948 | Deportivo Municipal | | |
| 1949–1950 | Deportivo Cali | | |
| 1951–1955 | Alianza Lima | | |
| 1956–1958 | Sporting Cristal | | |
| 1959–1960 | Alianza Lima | | |
| 1961–1962 | Atlético Baleares | 20 | (10) |
| 1962–1963 | Cádiz | 17 | (7) |

International career
| 1947–1957 | Peru | 31 | (7) |
- * Club domestic league appearances and goals

Máximo Mosquera Zegarra (8 January 1928 – 27 July 2016) was a Peruvian footballer who played as a striker.

== Biography ==
=== Club career ===
Born in Chincha Alta, Mosquera played for Deportivo Municipal, Deportivo Cali, Alianza Lima, Sporting Cristal, Atlético Baleares and Cádiz. He won the Peruvian Primera División with Deportivo Municipal (1943), Alianza Lima (1952, 1954, 1955), and Sporting Cristal (1956). In the 1955 season he was the top scorer in the league, with 11 goals.

=== International career ===
Mosquera was a member of the Peruvian national team between 1947 and 1957. He has 31 appearances and 7 goals for the national team.

=== Later life and death ===
Mosquera had a brief coaching experience at Porvenir Miraflores in 1969, before becoming a sports commentator on a Peruvian radio station: Radio Ovación. He's died on 27 July 2016.

== Honours ==
Deportivo Municipal

- Peruvian Primera División: 1943

Alianza Lima

- Peruvian Primera División (3): 1952, 1954, 1955

Sporting Cristal

- Peruvian Primera División: 1956

Individual

- Peruvian Primera División Top scorer: 1955 (11 goals)
