= Alfonso Huapaya =

Peruvian footballer and manager (1911–2009)

Personal information
- Full name: Ángel Alfonso Huapaya Cabrera
- Date of birth: 2 August 1911
- Place of birth: Lima, Peru
- Date of death: 16 April 2009 (aged 97)
- Place of death: Chaclacayo, Peru

Senior career*
Years	Team	Apps	(Gls)
- Independiente Chosica
- Mariscal Sucre

Managerial career
- 1944: Mariscal Sucre
- Centro Iqueño
- Mariscal Sucre
- 1950–1952: Sport Boys
- 1952: Peru
- 1954–1955: Sport Boys
- 1960: Alianza Lima
- 1966: Carlos Concha
- 1971: José Gálvez FBC
- 1971: Deportivo SIMA
- 1974: Walter Ormeño
- 1992: Deportivo Yurimaguas
- * Club domestic league appearances and goals

Ángel Alfonso Huapaya Cabrera (2 August 1911 – 16 April 2009) was a Peruvian football former and manager.

== Biography ==
=== Managerial career ===
Nicknamed El Sastre ("the tailor"), Alfonso Huapaya played for Mariscal Sucre in the 1930s.

After becoming a coach, he won the Peruvian championship in 1944 with the same club. Between 1950 and 1952, he managed Sport Boys, leading them to the 1951 championship, the first of Peru's professional era. Simultaneously, he coached the Peruvian national team at the 1952 Panamerican Championship in Santiago, Chile. He returned to Sport Boys for a second stint between 1954 and 1955.

In 1960, he was appointed head coach of Alianza Lima, a team boasting talented players such as Adolfo Riquelme (goalkeeper), Guillermo Delgado, Adolfo Donayre, Guillermo Barbadillo, Félix Castillo, and Víctor Zegarra. Despite a strong start to the season (five wins in the first seven matches), the team finished mid-table (6th out of 10).

In 1971, he won the Second Division championship with Deportivo SIMA. His last experience as a manager was in 1992, at the age of 80, at the helm of Deportivo Yurimaguas.

=== Death ===
He died on April 16, 2009, at his home in the Chaclacayo district of Lima. As a tribute, the Peruvian Football Federation named its football coaching institute after him (cf. external links).

== Honours (manager) ==
Mariscal Sucre

- Peruvian Primera División: 1944

Sport Boys

- Peruvian Primera División: 1951

Deportivo SIMA

- Peruvian Segunda División: 1971
