= Guillermo Barbadillo =

Peruvian footballer (1925–2000)

Personal information
- Full name: Guillermo Barbadillo Alvarado
- Date of birth: 9 January 1925
- Place of birth: Callao, Peru
- Date of death: 20 October 2000 (aged 75)
- Place of death: Callao, Peru
- Position: Forward

Senior career*
Years	Team	Apps	(Gls)
1942–1948	Sport Boys	101	(42)
1949	Deportivo Cali		(19)
1950–1953	Sport Boys	61	(41)
1954–1960	Alianza Lima		
1961–1962	Sport Boys	19	(2)

International career
1947–1956	Peru	25	(4)
- * Club domestic league appearances and goals

Guillermo Barbadillo Alvarado (9 January 1925 – 20 October 2000) was a Peruvian professional footballer who played as forward.

He formed a formidable attacking duo with Valeriano López in the 1940s and 1950s. His son, Gerónimo Barbadillo, is also a footballer, having played for the Peruvian national team in the 1970s and 1980s

== Biography ==
=== Club career ===
Guillermo "Willy" Barbadillo made his debut with Sport Boys in 1942 and won the Peruvian championship in his first year with the Rosado club. Seven years later, he joined Deportivo Cali and became Colombian runner-up, scoring 19 goals in the 1949 season. He was nicknamed Hombre Bicicleta (the Bicycle Man), by Colombians because of his speed.

Returning to Peru, he played again for Sport Boys and won the Peruvian championship for the second time in 1951. He also distinguished himself with Alianza Lima, winning his third and fourth Peruvian championships back-to-back in 1954 and 1955. He ended his career in 1962 with his boyhood club, Sport Boys of Callao.

=== International career ===
A Peruvian international between 1947 and 1956 (25 caps and four goals), "Willy" Barbadillo notably participated in four South American championships in 1947, 1953, 1955 and 1956. He also took part in the Panamerican Championships of 1952 (three goals scored) and 1956.

=== Death ===
Guillermo Barbadillo died at the age of 75 in Callao on 20 October 2000.

== Honours ==
Sport Boys

- Peruvian Primera División (2): 1942, 1951

Alianza Lima

- Peruvian Primera División (2): 1954, 1955
