= Atlético Deportivo Olímpico =

- Full name: Club Atlético Deportivo Olímpico
- Founded: 8 August 1946
- Dissolved: 1975
- League: Copa Perú
Home colours

Atlético Deportivo Olímpico was a Peruvian football club that played in the city of Callao, Lima, Peru.

== History ==
Atlético Deportivo Olímpico was founded on August 8, 1946, by Lucas Huanira, the Gandolfo brothers, and other young footballers from Callao, with Gilberto Fernández elected as the club’s first president.

In 1963, the club won Liga Provincial del Callao and, after defeating Santiago Barranco, secured promotion to the 1964 Peruvian Segunda División. In the 1968 Peruvian Segunda División season, Atlético Deportivo Olímpico finished as runners-up behind Deportivo Municipal, who earned promotion to the 1969 Torneo Descentralizado.

The club was crowned Second Division champions in 1970 under manager Pedro Valdivieso, earning promotion to the top flight. During that campaign, it contested the top spot with Atlético Sicaya and Centro Iqueño. Atlético Deportivo Olímpico had 26 points, while Centro Iqueño had 22. However, on the penultimate matchday, Centro Iqueño did not play due to a bye. Atlético Deportivo Olímpico faced Atlético Sicaya again and secured a 2–1 victory, with goals from Augusto Palacios. On the final matchday, the club defeated Independiente Sacachispas 2–0, securing the league title.

As a result, the club qualified for the 1971 Torneo Descentralizado, where it finished in 14th place and was relegated in the same season.

It returned to the Second Division for the 1972 season, where it fought to retain its status in the division against Atlético Sicaya in a two-legged playoff. The first match ended in a goalless draw, while Atlético Deportivo Olímpico won the second 2–0.

The following year, the Second Division was dissolved, forcing the club to return to the Liga Provincial del Callao, where it competed until 1974 when it was relegated. The next year, it did not take part in the Second District Division and subsequently disappeared.

== Statistics and results in First Division ==
=== League history ===
Season	Div.	Pos.	Pl.	W	D	L	GF	GA	P	Notes
1971	1st	14	30	5	10	15	32	56	20	14/16 Regular Season

== Honours ==
=== Senior titles ===
Keys

- Record
- ^{(s)} Shared record

Type	Competition	Titles	Runner-up	Winning years	Runner-up years
National (League)	Segunda División	1	1	1970	1968
Regional (League)	Liguilla de Ascenso a Segunda División	1	—	1963	—
Regional (League)	Primera División Amateur del Callao	1	—	1963	—
Regional (League)	Segunda División Amateur del Callao	1	—	1951	—

== See also ==
- List of football clubs in Peru
