= Segundo Castillo (footballer, born 1913) =

Peruvian footballer (1913–1993)

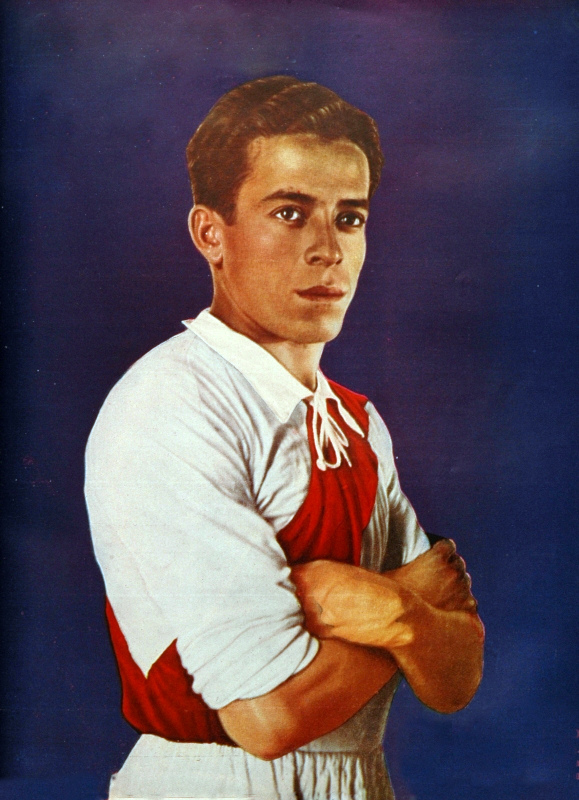

Personal information
- Full name: Segundo Castillo Varela
- Date of birth: 17 July 1913
- Place of birth: Callao, Peru
- Date of death: 1 October 1993 (aged 80)
- Place of death: Callao, Peru
- Position: Central midfielder

Senior career*
Years	Team	Apps	(Gls)
1932	Unión Buenos Aires		
1933–1939	Sport Boys		
1939–1940	Lanús		
1941–1942	Magallanes		
1943–1947	Deportivo Municipal		
1948–1949	Universitario		
1950	Independiente Medellín		
1951–1952	Universitario		
1953–1954	Unión Callao		

International career
1936–1939	Peru	11	(0)
1941	Chile	1	(0)
Medal record
Association football
Representing Peru
South American Championship
Gold medal – first place	1939 Peru	Team competition
Bolivarian Games
Gold medal – first place	1938 Colombia	Team competition
- * Club domestic league appearances and goals

Segundo Castillo Varela (17 July 1913 in Callao, Peru – 1 October 1993 in Callao, Peru) was a Peruvian footballer who played in Peru, Chile, Argentina and Colombia and for the Peru national football team. He was part of Peru's team at the 1936 Summer Olympics.

== International ==
In addition to having played for Peru, he made an appearance for Chile in 1941.

== Titles ==
- Sport Boys 1935 and 1937 (Peruvian Championship)
- Deportivo Municipal 1943 (Peruvian Championship)
- Universitario 1949 (Peruvian Championship)
