= Liga 2 (Peru) =

Liga 2 de Fútbol Profesional
- Organising body: FPF
- Founded: 1943; 83 years ago
- First season: 1943
- Country: Peru
- Confederation: CONMEBOL
- Number of clubs: 18
- Level on pyramid: 2
- Promotion to: Liga 1
- Relegation to: Liga 3
- Domestic cup: Copa de la Liga
- Current champions: Cajamarca (2025)
- Most championships: Carlos Concha; Ciclista Lima; Deportivo Municipal; Guardia Republicana; Mariscal Sucre; Sport Boys; Unión Callao; Unión Huaral (3 titles each)
- Current: 2026 season

The Liga 2 de Fútbol Profesional (English: "League 2 of Professional Football"), known as Liga 2, and Liga 2 Caja Cusco for sponsorship reasons, is the second-highest division in the Peruvian football league system. Founded in 1943 as the Segunda División, it is a professional and promotional division organized by the Peruvian Football Federation. Since 2026, it has been contested by 18 teams, with promotion to the Liga 1, and relegation to the Liga 3.

== History ==
The Peruvian Segunda División was the second division of Peruvian football from 1912 to 1925. It allowed promotion to the Primera Division for the starting seasons and was not a professional tournament. In the inaugural 1912 season, the First and Second Division were put together with 8 teams each. It was dissolved in 1925 after the Peruvian Football Federation was formed. The tournament was restarted in 1926, under the organization of the FPF, with the name of "Intermediate Tournament", the first champion was Association Alianza, after that in 1935 the championship was renamed "Ascenso División de Honor" where it granted promotion to teams from Lima and Callao. It would later be replaced by the current Segunda Division, now known as the Liga 2, in 1936. Despite being founded in 1936, the league did not have its first season up until 1943, where Atlético Telmo Carbajo won the tournament.

For decades after it was first formed in 1943, only clubs from the Department of Lima participated in the annual tournament where the winner gets promoted to the Copa Perú. From 1988 to 1990, the winner got promoted to the Torneo Metropolitano Regional. It was not until 1992 when Peruvian football federation expanded the tournament to other regions, expanding it to the Ica and Callao.

From 1993 to 1997 the winner was promoted directly to the Primera División. From 1998 it was established that the champion of this tournament would play a revalidation match with the team that finished second to last in the decentralized championship of the same year. In 2002, following the FPF's policy of increasing the number of teams in the first division, the champion of this tournament was immediately promoted. In 2004 and 2005 the format changed, establishing that the champion and runner-up of the second division would be integrated into Region 4 of the Copa Perú.

In 2006, the Second Division was moved up to the second tier once again, where the winner gets promotion to the First Division. As a result, the Copa Peru was moved down to the third tier. It was only in 2006 that it was decided to decentralize this tournament (until then reserved for teams from Lima and Callao), the championship began to be played with teams from different departments of Peru that obtained the category. However, despite the decentralist spirit of this measure, some articles were established in the regulations that obliged teams of a certain distance from Lima to pay the tickets of rival teams. It should be said that with this, the duality of promotion to the First Division occurred because the Copa Perú, the traditional amateur football tournament, was also of a national nature, a situation that does not happen in any country worldwide and where it was seen that the Second Division should remain as the only way to promotion to the First Division. However, while it was nominally Second Professional, it was officially promotional.

In 2019, the Peruvian Football Federation announced the creation of the Liga 3, which replaced the Copa Peru as the third tier, moving the Copa Peru down to the fourth tier in 2024. Relegation from the Liga 2 was since changed to the Liga 3. In 2026, with the creation of the Copa de la Liga, teams from the Liga 2 compete alongside teams from the Liga 1 for the domestic cup competition.

== Division levels ==
Year	Level	Promotion to	Relegation to
1943–1950	2	Primera División	Liga Regional de Lima y Callao
1951–1955	2	Primera División	Liga Provincial de Lima Liga Provincial del Callao
1956–1972	2	Primera División	Liga Provincial de Lima Liga Provincial del Callao Liga de los Balnearios del Sur
1983	2	(None) (Note: The FPF annulled the promotion to the First Division.)	Copa Perú Ligas Departamentales Ligas Provinciales Ligas Distritales
1984–1987	3	División Intermedia (Note: There was no promotion to the Peruvian First Division. The champion and runner-up qualified for the División Intermedia A.)	Copa Perú Ligas Departamentales Ligas Provinciales Ligas Distritales
1988–1990	2	Primera División	Copa Perú Ligas Departamentales Ligas Provinciales Ligas Distritales
1991	2	Torneo Zonal (Note: There was no promotion to the Peruvian First Division. The first six places qualified for the 1992 Torneo Zonal while the rest of the teams were relegated to the Copa Perú.)	Copa Perú Ligas Departamentales Ligas Provinciales Ligas Distritales
1992–2003	2	Primera División	Copa Perú Ligas Departamentales Ligas Provinciales Ligas Distritales
2004–2005	2	Copa Perú (National stage) (Note: There was no promotion to the Peruvian First Division. The champion and runner-up qualified for the Copa Peru's National stage.)	Copa Perú Ligas Departamentales Ligas Provinciales Ligas Distritales
2006–2018	2	Primera División	Copa Perú Ligas Departamentales Ligas Provinciales Ligas Distritales
2019–2023	2	Liga 1	Copa Perú Ligas Departamentales Ligas Provinciales Ligas Distritales
2024–present	2	Liga 1	Liga 3

== Competition format and sponsorship ==
Logo for ADFP Segunda División until 2019

Since 2006, the winner of the tournament is promoted to the First Division, while the last two teams are relegated from the tournament to the Departamental Stage of the Copa Perú. Their places are taken by the two relegated clubs from the First Division, and the team that finishes second place in the Copa Perú. From 2018 to 2023, the Liga 2 would adopt a new format, where the top ranking team throughout the whole season would win the tournament and be automatically promoted, and the next six teams compete in a bracket Ligiulla stage, with the winner also being promoted.

After the expansion to 18 for the 2024 season, the format was changed to multiple stages. The first stage known as the Regional Stage would split the 18 teams into two groups of nine, called the Zona Norte and Zona Sur, based in the north and the south. The top six of each zone would advance to the Group Stage and bottom three into the Relegation Group. In the Group Stage, the 12 teams will be split into two groups of six with the top three teams advance to the Ligiulla stage, with the top team of each group in the semi-finals and rest in quarter-finals. The finalists of the Ligiulla stage will be promoted to the first division and the winners winning the league. In the relegation group, each team will play in a round-robin format. The lowest ranked team of each group gets relegated to the newly created Liga 3.

Number of clubs in Segunda División throughout the years
Period (in years)	No. of clubs
1943	4 clubs
1944	5 clubs
1945	6 clubs
1946–1947	8 clubs
1948	7 clubs
1949–1950	8 clubs
1951–1969	10 clubs
1970	11 clubs
1971	10 clubs
1972	11 clubs
1983	14 clubs
1984	12 clubs
1985	9 clubs
1986–1987	20 clubs

Number of clubs in Segunda División throughout the years
Period (in years)	No. of clubs
1988	22 clubs
1989–1990	20 clubs
1991	18 clubs
1992–1996	12 clubs
1997	14 clubs
1998	11 clubs
1999	12 clubs
2000	13 clubs
2001–2002	16 clubs
2003	13 clubs
2004–2006	12 clubs
2007	11 clubs
2008	10 clubs
2009	12 clubs

Number of clubs in Segunda División throughout the years
Period (in years)	No. of clubs
2010–2012	10 clubs
2013	14 clubs
2014	16 clubs
2015	12 clubs
2016	16 clubs
2017–2018	15 clubs
2019	12 clubs
2020	10 clubs
2021	12 clubs
2022	13 clubs
2023	14 clubs
2024	16 clubs
2025	15 clubs
2026	18 clubs

=== Sponsorship ===
The Peruvian Second Division currently is sponsored by Caja Cusco. Movistar's Gol Perú has exclusive broadcasting rights. L1MAX, Nativa TV and FPF Play also broadcast the tournament.

== Criticisms ==
The Segunda División has received numerous criticisms, chiefly due to the lack of stability in the process of competition and promotion, and the lack of professionalism.

=== Team count ===
The Segunda División has changed the number of teams that operate in the league several times. Over the course of 74 years, the Segunda has had as few as four teams and as many as 16. The early Segunda División were played with an average number of teams ranging from 4 to 10. Prior to the current 12-club Segunda División, during the 2000s, the team count continued to fluctuate between 10, 12, 14, 16 and even a surprising 13. For example, 12 teams competed in 2009, 10 competed in 2008, 11 competed in 2007, and 12 teams competed from 2004 to 2006. The over-all goal of the organization is to have a stable league of 16 teams. It would be expanded to 18 in 2024.

=== Artificial turf ===
Several stadiums used in the second division have artificial grass installed for the so-called massification of sport. Most stadiums in Peru are owned by the IPD (Instituto Peruano del Deporte), which is the state group responsible for supporting the use of artificial turf. This has been severely criticized by top division teams and the media. At first, these artificial turfs were installed for the 2005 FIFA U-17 World Cup; however, more artificial turf was installed in other stadiums after the U-17 World Cup concluded. These turfs are criticized for having a negative influence on the game and for the injuries which they cause to players.

== Clubs ==
Currently, 18 clubs participate in Liga 2. There are currently no teams from the Lima Metropolitan area with all clubs representing cities from the country's interior. The number of clubs has fluctuated season by season from 10 to 18 teams participating in the tournament. The tournament was finally set to be 18 teams in 2024 but later moved to 15 after the suspension of Juan Aurich, Deportivo Municipal and Unión Huaral.

Ciclista Lima, Unión Huaral, Deportivo Municipal, Mariscal Sucre, Unión Callao, Sport Boys, Alcides Vigo and Carlos Concha are the most successful clubs (three titles each). Universidad César Vallejo, Total Clean (now Total Chalaco), Cobresol, José Gálvez, Los Caimanes, Comerciantes Unidos, Cienciano, Alianza Atlético, Atlético Grau, Cusco, Alianza Universidad and Cajamarca are the only clubs outside the metropolitan area of Lima to have won a Segunda Division championship. In addition, Atlético Chalaco, Centro Iqueño, Defensor Lima, Deportivo Municipal, Mariscal Sucre, Sport Boys and Unión Huaral are the only teams that have been champions of the First and Second Division.

Since the Second Division became a nation-wide tournament in 2006, 21 of the 25 regions have had representative teams in the Segunda División/Liga 2. The only four regions that have never had a representative are Amazonas, Huancavelica, Madre de Dios, and Tumbes.

=== Stadia and locations ===
Locations of the 2026 Liga 2 teams

Team	City	Stadium	Capacity
Academia Cantolao	Callao	Miguel Grau	17,000
ADA	Jaén	Víctor Montoya Segura	9,000
Alianza Universidad	Huánuco	Heraclio Tapia	25,000
Ayacucho	Ayacucho	Las Américas	6,400
Bentín Tacna Heroica	Tacna	Jorge Basadre	19,850
Binacional	Juliaca	Guillermo Briceño Rosamedina	20,030
Carlos A. Mannucci	Trujillo	Mansiche	25,036
Comerciantes	Iquitos	Max Augustín	24,576
Deportivo Llacuabamba	Huamachuco	Municipal de Huamachuco	5,000
Estudiantil CNI	Iquitos	Max Augustín	24,576
Pirata	Chongoyape	Municipal de la Juventud	2,500
San Marcos	Huaraz	Rosas Pampa	18,000
Santos	Nazca	Municipal de Nasca	10,000
Sport Huancayo II	Huancayo	Huancayo	20,000
Unión Comercio	Nueva Cajamarca	IPD de Nueva Cajamarca	12,000
Unión Minas	Cerro de Pasco	Daniel Alcides Carrión	12,000
Universidad César Vallejo	Trujillo	César Acuña Peralta	2,000
Universidad San Martín	Lima	Villa Deportiva USMP	1,249

== Champions ==
Peruvian Segunda División had amateur status since its foundation until 1987. In the course of this era, Telmo Carbajo, Ciclista Lima, Unión Callao, Carlos Concha and Mariscal Sucre shared the most titles. The first run from 1943 to 1987 featured clubs only from Lima and Callao. In 2006 expanded the league to the entire nation, beginning the Segunda División Nacional.

- For the period 1912–1925, see Segunda División (1912–1925)
- For the period 1926–1934, see División Intermedia
- For the period 1935–1940, see Ligas Provinciales de Lima y Callao
- For the period 1941, see 1941 Segunda División Regional de Lima y Callao
- For the period 1942, see 1942 Primera División Regional de Lima y Callao
- For the period 1973, see Octogonal de Ascenso
- For the period 1974, see Reclasificatorio Regional
- For the period 1975–1982, see Liga Mayor de Fútbol de Lima / Región IX Metropolitana (Copa Perú)

Note: For coaches who have won the 2nd division championship, see: RSSSF

- (In bracket, title count):

Ed.	Season	Champion	Runner-up	Third place	Winning manager
Segunda División
1	1943	Telmo Carbajo (1)	Progresista Apurímac	Ciclista Lima	
2	1944	Ciclista Lima (1)	Telmo Carbajo	Santiago Barranco	
3	1945	Santiago Barranco (1)	Atlético Lusitania	Ciclista Lima	
4	1946	Ciclista Lima (2)	Unión Callao	Atlético Lusitania	
5	1947	Jorge Chávez (1)	Santiago Barranco	Unión Callao	(Peru) Mario Pacheco
6	1948	Centro Iqueño (1)	Santiago Barranco	Unión Callao	
7	1949	Jorge Chávez (2)	Ciclista Lima	Unión Callao	
8	1950	Unión Callao (1)	Association Chorrillos	Unión Carbone	(Peru) Luis Zevallos
9	1951	Association Chorrillos (1)	Atlético Lusitania	Santiago Barranco	(Peru) Roberto López
10	1952	Unión Callao (2)	Porvenir Miraflores	Santiago Barranco	
11	1953	Carlos Concha (1)	Atlético Lusitania	Jorge Chávez	
12	1954	Unión Callao(3)	KDT Nacional	Atlético Lusitania	(Peru) Segundo Castillo
13	1955	Carlos Concha (2)	Porvenir Miraflores	Unión América	
14	1956	Porvenir Miraflores (1)	Unión América	Unidad Vecinal Nº3	
15	1957	Mariscal Castilla (1)	Carlos Concha	Juventud Gloria	
16	1958	Unión América (1)	Porvenir Miraflores	Carlos Concha	(Peru) José Chiarella
17	1959	Mariscal Sucre (1)	KDT Nacional	Porvenir Miraflores	(Greece) Dan Georgiadis
18	1960	Defensor Lima (1)	Carlos Concha	KDT Nacional	(Peru) Adelfo Magallanes
19	1961	KDT Nacional (1)	Association Chorrillos	Unidad Vecinal Nº3	(Peru) José Chiarella
20	1962	Mariscal Sucre (2)	Carlos Concha	Porvenir Miraflores	
21	1963	Carlos Concha (3)	Porvenir Miraflores	Atlético Lusitania	(Peru) Carlos Aparicio
22	1964	Defensor Arica (1)	Porvenir Miraflores	Atlético Chalaco	(Peru) Emilio Vargas
23	1965	Mariscal Sucre (3)	Íntimos de La Legua	Juventud Gloria	(Peru) Roberto Reinoso
24	1966	Porvenir Miraflores (2)	Racing San Isidro	Íntimos de La Legua	(Peru) Alejandro Heredia
25	1967	KDT Nacional (2)	Independiente Sacachispas	ADO	(Peru) Segundo Castillo
26	1968	Deportivo Municipal (1)	ADO	Carlos Concha	(Peru) Alejandro Heredia
27	1969	Deportivo SIMA (1)	Mariscal Sucre		(Peru) Jorge Chávez Fernández
28	1970	ADO (1)	Centro Iqueño		(Peru) Pedro Valdivieso
29	1971	Deportivo SIMA (2)	Atlético Chalaco		(Peru) Alfonso Huapaya
30	1972	Atlético Chalaco (1)	Porvenir Miraflores	Mariscal Sucre	(Peru) Alberto Terry
–	1973–82	No Tournament			
Segunda División Experimental
31	1983	Unión González Prada (1)	Academia Cantolao	Huracán San Agustín	
Segunda División
32	1984	Unión González Prada (2)	Juventud La Joya		
33	1985	Alcides Vigo (1)	Centro Iqueño		
34	1986	Internazionale (1)	AELU		
35	1987	AELU (1)	CITEN		
36	1988	Defensor Lima (2)	Juventud La Palma	Sport Boys	(Peru) Roberto Chale
37	1989	Sport Boys (1)	Juventud La Palma	Guardia Republicana	(Argentina) Vito Andrés Bártoli
38	1990	Hijos de Yurimaguas (1)	Walter Ormeño	Juventud La Palma	(Chile) Miguel Ángel Arrué
39	1991	Enrique Lau Chun (1)	Deportivo Zúñiga	Guardia Republicana	
40	1992	Unión Huaral (1)	Ciclista Lima	Guardia Republicana	(Peru) Rufino Bernales
41	1993	Ciclista Lima (3)	Guardia Republicana	Alcides Vigo	(Chile) Ramón Estay
42	1994	Unión Huaral (2)	Hijos de Yurimaguas	Deportivo Zúñiga	(Peru) Alberto Gallardo
43	1995	Guardia Republicana (1)	Deportivo Zúñiga	Lawn Tennis	(Peru) Alberto Gallardo
44	1996	Alcides Vigo (2)	Hijos de Yurimaguas	Unión Huaral	(Peru) Alberto Gallardo
45	1997	Lawn Tennis (1)	Bella Esperanza	Hijos de Yurimaguas	(Peru) Luis Zacarías
46	1998	Hijos de Yurimaguas (2)	Alcides Vigo	AELU	(Peru) Tito Chumpitaz
47	1999	América Cochahuayco (1)	Sporting Cristal B (Note: Sporting Cristal B can´t be promoted as they are the "reserve team" of Sporting Cristal which plays in First Division.)	Alcides Vigo	(Peru) Luis Reyna (Peru) Luis Rubiños
48	2000	Aviación-FAP (1)	Alcides Vigo	Hijos de Yurimaguas	(Argentina) Ramón Quiroga
49	2001	Alcides Vigo (3)	AELU	Bella Esperanza	(Brazil) Dorival da Silva
50	2002	Unión Huaral (3)	Defensor Villa del Mar	Sporting Cristal B	(Peru) Pedro Ruíz
51	2003	Sport Coopsol (1)	Sporting Cristal B	Olimpico Somos Perú	(Peru) Jorge Machuca
52	2004	Olimpico Somos Perú (1)	Deportivo Municipal	Unión de Campeones	(Peru) Rodolfo Chávarry
53	2005	Olimpico Somos Perú (2)	Aviación-Coopsol	Deportivo Municipal	(Peru) Ronald Amoretti
Segunda División Nacional
54	2006	Deportivo Municipal (2)	Universidad San Marcos	Aviación-Coopsol	(Peru) Juan José Tan
55	2007	Universidad César Vallejo (1)	Atlético Minero	UTC	(Peru) Roberto Arrelucea
56	2008	Total Clean (1)	Inti Gas	Sport Águila	(Peru) Freddy García
57	2009	Sport Boys (2)	Cobresol	Deportivo Coopsol	(Peru) Titín Drago
58	2010	Cobresol (1)	Sport Áncash	Hijos de Acosvinchos	(Peru) Freddy García
59	2011	José Gálvez (1)	Deportivo Coopsol	Alianza Unicachi	(Peru) Rafael Castillo
60	2012	Pacífico (1)	Deportivo Coopsol	Los Caimanes	(Peru) Juan Carlos Bazalar
61	2013	Los Caimanes (1)	Alfonso Ugarte	Atlético Torino	(Peru) Teddy Cardama
62	2014	Deportivo Municipal (3)	Deportivo Coopsol	Carlos A. Mannucci	(Peru) Carlos Cortijo
63	2015	Comerciantes Unidos (1)	Los Caimanes	Atlético Torino	(Peru) Carlos Cortijo
64	2016	Academia Cantolao (1)	Sport Áncash	Cienciano	(Peru) Carlos Silvestri
65	2017	Sport Boys (3)	Universidad César Vallejo	Deportivo Hualgayoc	(Uruguay) Mario Viera
66	2018	Universidad César Vallejo (2)	Carlos A. Mannucci	Cienciano	(Peru) José del Solar
Liga 2
67	2019	Cienciano (1)	Atlético Grau	Deportivo Coopsol	(Argentina) Marcelo Grioni
68	2020	Alianza Atlético (1)	Juan Aurich	Unión Huaral	(Peru) Jahir Butrón
69	2021	Atlético Grau (1)	Carlos Stein	Sport Chavelines	(Peru) Jesús Oropesa
70	2022	Cusco (1)	Unión Comercio	Santos	(Uruguay) Pablo Peirano
71	2023	Comerciantes Unidos (2)	Los Chankas	Alianza Universidad	(Peru) Carlos Silvestri
72	2024	Alianza Universidad (1)	Juan Pablo II College	Comerciantes	(Peru) Paul Cominges
73	2025	Cajamarca (1)	Deportivo Moquegua	Universidad César Vallejo	(Peru) Juan Carlos Malpica
74	2026				

== Titles by club ==
Rank	Club	Winners	Runners-up	Winning years	Runners-up years
1	Carlos Concha	3	3	1953, 1955, 1963	1957, 1960, 1962
1	Alcides Vigo	3	2	1985, 1996, 2001	1998, 2000
1	Ciclista Lima	3	2	1944, 1946, 1993	1949, 1992
1	Deportivo Municipal	3	1	1968, 2006, 2014	2004
1	Mariscal Sucre	3	1	1959, 1962, 1965	1969
1	Unión Callao	3	1	1950, 1952, 1954	1946
1	Sport Boys	3	0	1989, 2009, 2017	—
1	Unión Huaral	3	0	1992, 1994, 2002	—
2	Porvenir Miraflores	2	6	1956, 1966	1952, 1955, 1958, 1963, 1964, 1972
2	Hijos de Yurimaguas	2	2	1990, 1998	1994, 1996
2	KDT Nacional	2	2	1961, 1967	1954, 1959
2	Universidad César Vallejo	2	1	2007, 2018	2017
2	Comerciantes Unidos	2	0	2015, 2023	—
2	Defensor Lima	2	0	1960, 1988	—
2	Deportivo SIMA	2	0	1969, 1971	—
2	Olímpico Somos Perú	2	0	2004, 2005	—
2	Jorge Chávez	2	0	1947, 1949	—
2	Unión González Prada	2	0	1983, 1984	—
3	AELU	1	2	1987	1986, 2001
3	Association Chorrillos	1	2	1951	1950, 1961
3	Santiago Barranco	1	2	1945	1947, 1948
3	ADO	1	1	1970	1968
3	Atlético Chalaco	1	1	1972	1971
3	Atlético Grau	1	1	2021	2019
3	Aviación-FAP	1	1	2000	2005
3	Centro Iqueño	1	1	1948	1970
3	Cobresol	1	1	2010	2009
3	Guardia Republicana	1	1	1995	1993
3	Los Caimanes	1	1	2013	2015
3	Telmo Carbajo	1	1	1943	1944
3	Unión América	1	1	1958	1956
3	Academia Cantolao	1	0	2016	—
3	Alianza Atlético	1	0	2020	—
3	Alianza Universidad	1	0	2024	—
3	América Cochahuayco	1	0	1999	—
3	Cajamarca	1	0	2025	—
3	Cienciano	1	0	2019	—
3	Cusco	1	0	2022	—
3	Defensor Arica	1	0	1964	—
3	Enrique Lau Chun	1	0	1991	—
3	Internazionale	1	0	1986	—
3	José Gálvez	1	0	2011	—
3	Lawn Tennis	1	0	1997	—
3	Mariscal Castilla	1	0	1957	—
3	Pacífico	1	0	2012	—
3	Sport Coopsol	1	0	2003	—
3	Total Clean	1	0	2008	—

== Titles by region ==
Region	Nº of titles	Clubs
Lima	38	Alcides Vigo (3), Ciclista Lima (3), Unión Huaral (3), Deportivo Municipal (3), Mariscal Sucre (3), Unión González Prada (2), Defensor Lima (2), Olímpico Somos Perú (2), Porvenir Miraflores (2), América Cochahuayco (1), AELU (1), Association Chorrillos (1), Centro Iqueño (1), Defensor Arica (1), Deportivo Aviación (1), Enrique Lau Chun (1), Guardia Republicana (1), Lawn Tennis (1), Mariscal Castilla (1), Pacífico (1), Santiago Barranco (1), Sport Coopsol (1), Internazionale (1), Unión América (1)
Callao	21	Carlos Concha (3), Unión Callao (3), Sport Boys (3), Hijos de Yurimaguas (2), Jorge Chávez (2), KDT Nacional (2), Deportivo SIMA (2), Atlético Chalaco (1), ADO (1), Academia Cantolao (1), Telmo Carbajo (1)
(Department of Cajamarca) Cajamarca	3	Comerciantes Unidos (2), Cajamarca (1)
Cusco	2	Cienciano (1), Cusco (1)
(La Libertad Region) La Libertad	2	Universidad César Vallejo (2)
(Department of Piura) Piura	2	Alianza Atlético (1), Atlético Grau (1)
Ancash	1	José Gálvez (1)
Arequipa	1	Total Clean (1)
(Department of Huánuco) Huánuco	1	Alianza Universidad (1)
(Department of Lambayeque) Lambayeque	1	Los Caimanes (1)
(Department of Moquegua) Moquegua	1	Cobresol (1)

== Half-year / Short tournaments ==
=== Apertura and Clausura / Fase 1 and Fase 2 seasons ===
Season		Champion	Runner-up	Third Place
2021	Fase 1	Sport Chavelines	Atlético Grau	Unión Comercio
2021	Fase 2	Unión Huaral	Unión Comercio	Carlos Stein
2022	Apertura	Cusco	Unión Comercio	Los Chankas
2022	Clausura	Cusco	Unión Comercio	Santos

== See also ==
- Football in Peru
- Peruvian Football Federation
- Copa LFP - FPF
- Peruvian football league system
  - Liga 1
  - Liga 3
  - Copa Perú
  - Ligas Departamentales del Peru
  - Ligas Provinciales del Peru
  - Ligas Distritales del Peru
