= Club Unión Callao de Deportes =

Peruvian football club

Unión Callao
- Full name: Club Unión Callao
- Nickname: Canarios
- Founded: 1908
- Dissolved: 1962; 64 years ago
- League: Copa Perú
Home colours

Unión Callao was a Peruvian football club that played in the city of Callao, Peru. It was founded in 1908 and competed in the Peruvian Primera División in the 1950s.

== History ==
Club Unión Callao was founded in Callao in 1908. In 1942, its president, Luis Zegarra Albarracín, purchased the sporting category of Sportivo Águila, and that same year the club began competing in the Tercera División Regional de Lima y Callao, achieving two consecutive promotions to reach the Primera División Regional de Lima y Callao. In 1945, it won the title in that category and was promoted to the 1946 Peruvian Segunda División.

The club was crowned Second Division champions in 1950, 1952, and 1954. It competed in the Peruvian Primera División in 1951, 1953, and 1955. In the latter year, it was relegated to the Second Division and the following year to the Liga Provincial del Callao. It then played in the First Division of that league until being relegated in 1961, and did not take part in the Segunda División del Callao the following year. In 1963, it competed in the Tercera División del Callao, and after that season, it did not participate in official competitions again.

== Statistics and results in First Division ==
=== League history ===
Season	Div.	Pos.	Pl.	W	D	L	GF	GA	P	Notes
1951	1st	10	18	2	5	11	33	52	9	10/10 Regular Season
1953	1st	10	18	4	5	9	27	42	13	10/10 Regular Season
1955	1st	10	18	2	3	13	20	47	7	10/10 Regular Season

== Honours ==
=== Senior titles ===
Keys

- Record
- ^{(s)} Shared record

Type	Competition	Titles	Runner-up	Winning years	Runner-up years
National (League)	Segunda División	3	1	1950, 1952, 1954	1946
Regional (League)	Primera División Regional de Lima y Callao	1	1	1945	1944
Regional (League)	Segunda División Regional de Lima y Callao	1	—	1943 Serie B	—

== See also ==
- List of football clubs in Peru
- Peruvian football league system
