= KDT Nacional =

- Full name: Club KDT Nacional
- Founded: 1931
- Ground: Estadio Telmo Carbajo
- Capacity: 8,000
- League: Copa Perú
Home colours

KDT Nacional Sporting Club is a football club based in the Constitutional Province of Callao, Peru. It was founded on January 1, 1931, and participated in the First Division of Peru in two periods: the first from 1962 to 1964, and the second from 1968 to 1969, during national championships.

== History ==
KDT Nacional Sporting Club was founded on January 1, 1931, by Gualberto Lizárraga. During the 1940s, the club competed in the Regional League of Lima and Callao, and in 1950 it won the championship, earning promotion to the Peruvian Second Division. In the 1954 season, KDT Nacional enjoyed its first notable campaign in that category, remaining in contention for the title until the final matchday alongside Unión Callao, which ultimately secured promotion.

In the 1959 Second Division, KDT Nacional narrowly missed promotion to the First Division after suffering a 1–0 defeat against Mariscal Sucre in the decisive match, having been level on points at the top of the table. The club achieved redemption in 1961, winning the Second Division title with a 2–1 victory over Unidad Vecinal No. 3 in the final match and securing promotion ahead of Association Chorrillos. However, its return to the top tier proved challenging, as the team finished eighth in the 1962 season, recording four wins, eight losses, and six draws.

After two consecutive seasons near the bottom of the standings, KDT Nacional was relegated in 1964, having won only one of its 22 matches that year. The club returned to prominence in 1967 by winning the Second Division championship once again, surpassing Independiente Sacachispas and earning promotion to the First Division. It remained in the top flight until the 1969 Descentralizado tournament, where it finished last in both the initial stage and the relegation round, resulting in another demotion. The following year, KDT Nacional competed in the Second Division but was relegated once more, alongside Huracán San Isidro, returning to the Callao League.

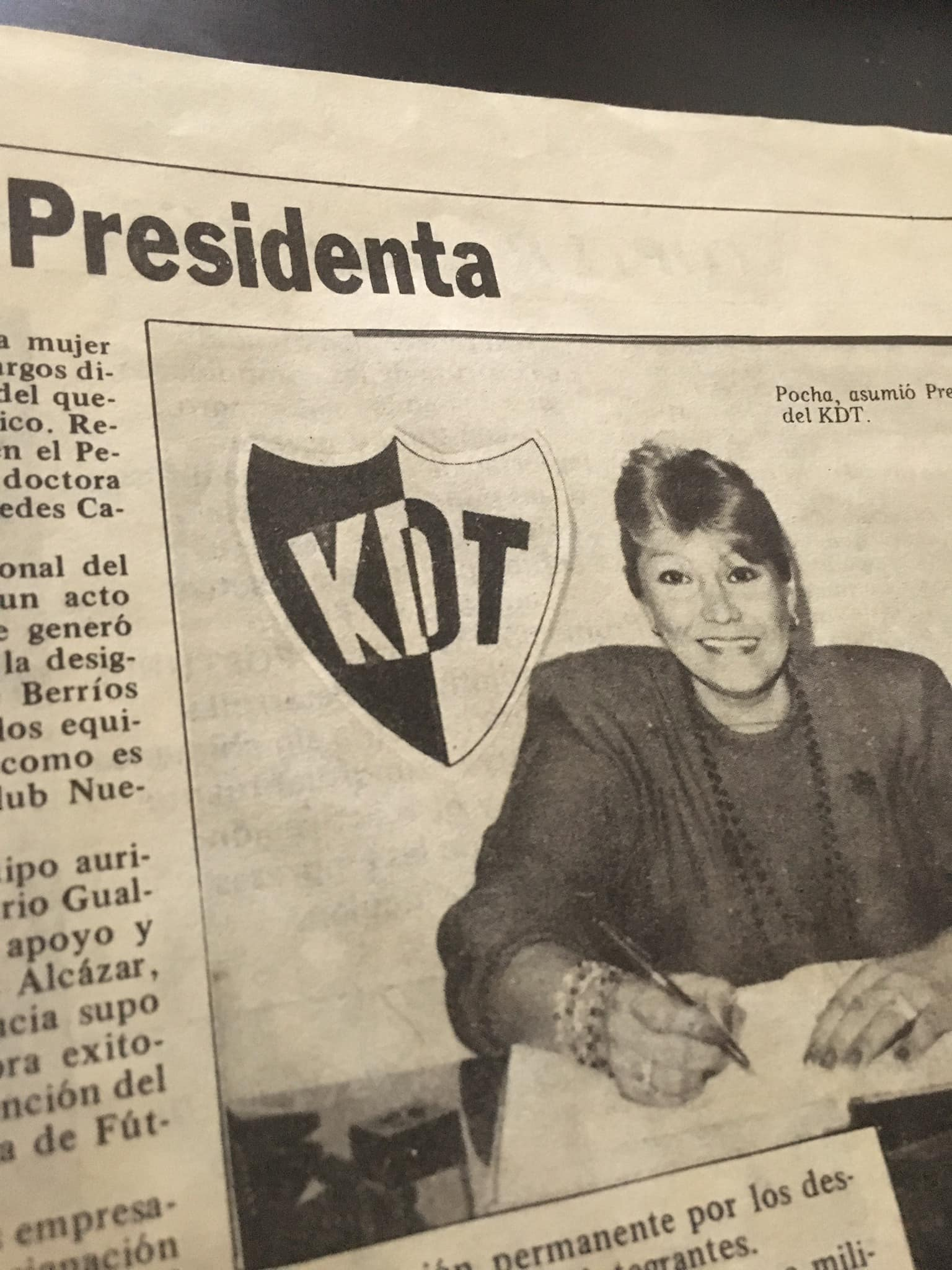
'Rosa Ana Berríos Orúe', known as Pochita Berríos, who led the club from 1986 to 1990

Between 1986 and 1990, the club was led by Rosa Ana Berríos Orúe, popularly known as “Pochita” Berríos, who became the first female president in the history of Peruvian sports. Under her leadership, KDT Nacional ended a 22-year title drought by winning the District League in 1987. The club also triumphed in the Callao Departmental League, qualifying for the Regional Stage of the 1988 Copa Perú. There, it competed in Region IV against Sport Puerto Aéreo and Bella Esperanza but was unable to secure promotion to the Second Division.

In the decades that followed, KDT Nacional struggled in the lower divisions of the Callao League. In 2003, Mr. Wenceslao Miller decided to withdraw the team from the Second District League due to a lack of financial guarantees, as he had been the sole supporter of the club’s operations.

A turning point came on November 15, 2013, when, after a lengthy meeting between Wenceslao Miller, businesswoman Fanny Rodríguez, and coach Juan Carlos Rodríguez, the club officially announced its revival. In the following years, KDT Nacional competed in the Bellavista–La Perla District League, aiming to reach the Callao Superior League and eventually the Departmental League.

In 2014, the club assembled a squad combining experienced players and young talents. After finishing third in the district competition, it advanced to the Departmental League, where it was placed in Group A alongside Academia Cantolao, Alfredo Tomassini, and Estrella Azul. After finishing level on points with Cantolao, both teams played a tiebreaker match on September 21, 2014, which Cantolao won 3–2 in a closely contested encounter. Although the original schedule had assigned different opponents for each team, both clubs agreed to forgo those matches and determine the group winner through a single playoff.

In 2015, KDT Nacional once again finished third in the Callao District League and qualified for the Interligas, where it was eliminated in the first round by Estrella Azul de Ventanilla. The following year, the club achieved a runner-up finish in the district league and qualified for the Departmental League, but was eliminated in the opening stage by Alfredo Tomassini. Since then, KDT Nacional has not participated in official competitions.

== Honours ==
=== Senior titles ===
Keys

- Record
- ^{(s)} Shared record

| Type | Competition | Titles | Runner-up | Winning years | Runner-up years |
|---|---|---|---|---|---|
| National (League) | Segunda División | 2 | 2 | 1961, 1967 | 1954, 1959 |
| Regional (League) | Liga Departamental de Callao | 1 | — | 1987 | — |
| Regional (League) | Liga Distrital del Callao | 1 | 2 | 1987 | 1990, 2016 |
| Regional (League) | Primera División Regional de Lima y Callao | 1 | 2 | 1950 | 1946, 1947 |
| Regional (League) | Segunda División Regional de Lima y Callao | — | 1 | — | 1942 |
| Regional (League) | División Intermedia (Callao) | — | 1 | — | 1937 |

== See also ==
- List of football clubs in Peru
- Peruvian football league system
