= Porvenir Miraflores =

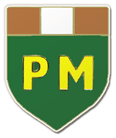
- Full name: Club Porvenir Miraflores
- Founded: May 29, 1922
- Dissolved: 1986; 40 years ago
- League: Copa Perú
Home colours

Porvenir Miraflores was a Peruvian football club, playing in the district of Miraflores, Lima, Peru. Founded on May 22, 1922. It competed in several seasons in the Peruvian Segunda División.

== History ==
The club was founded in 1922 in the Miraflores District, Lima.

The club was the winner of the 1956 and 1966 Peruvian Segunda Division.

The club has played at the highest level of Peruvian football on six occasions, from 1957 until 1971 when it was relegated.

During the 1972 Peruvian Segunda División season, the club changed its name to Miraflores F.B.C., delivering a solid campaign in the Second Division where it finished in second place behind Atlético Chalaco.

The Peruvian Football Federation invited Miraflores F.B.C. to take part in the 1983 Peruvian Segunda División, which was held on an experimental basis. The club competed in that category until the following edition, when it was placed in Intermedia B and was relegated.

It later participated without success in the Regional Stage of the 1985 Copa Perú, after which it returned to its league of origin.

== Naming history ==
| Season | Club name |
|---|---|
| 1922–1971 | Porvenir Miraflores |
| 1972–1986 | Miraflores FBC |

== Statistics and results in First Division ==
=== League history ===
| Season | Div. | Pos. | Pl. | W | D | L | GF | GA | P | Notes |
|---|---|---|---|---|---|---|---|---|---|---|
| 1957 | 1st | 10 | 22 | 4 | 7 | 11 | 25 | 52 | 15 | 10/10 Regular Season |
| 1967 | 1st | 8 | 26 | 8 | 7 | 11 | 24 | 28 | 23 | 8/14 Regular season |
| 1968 | 1st | 12 | 26 | 6 | 6 | 14 | 27 | 43 | 18 | 12/14 Regular season |
| 1969 | 1st | 12 | 20 | 7 | 3 | 10 | 35 | 47 | 17 | 11/14 First Stage, 6/8 Relegation Group |
| 1970 | 1st | 10 | 32 | 8 | 12 | 12 | 39 | 49 | 45 | 10/14 First Stage, 3/7 Relegation Group |
| 1971 | 1st | 16 | 30 | 3 | 12 | 15 | 38 | 63 | 18 | 16/16 Regular Season |

== Honours ==
=== Senior titles ===
Keys

- Record
- ^{(s)} Shared record

| Type | Competition | Titles | Runner-up | Winning years | Runner-up years |
|---|---|---|---|---|---|
| National (League) | Segunda División | 2 | 5 | 1956, 1966 | 1952, 1955, 1958, 1963, 1964 |
| Regional (League) | Primera División Regional de Lima y Callao | — | 1 | — | 1949 |
| Regional (League) | Liga de los Balnearios del Sur | — | 1 | — | 1973 |
| Regional (League) | División Intermedia | 1 | — | 1939 | — |
| Regional (League) | Segunda División Amateur de Lima | 2 | — | 1926 Liga de Balnearios, 1932 Zona de Balnearios | — |

== Notable players ==
- (Peru) (Israel) Raul Geller (1960–1964)
- (Argentina) José Varacka (1967)
- (Argentina) Vladislao Cap (1967)
- (Brazil) Zózimo (1967)
- (Peru) Héctor Bailetti (1966–1967)
- (Peru) Arturo Bisetti (1969–1971)
- (Peru) Moisés Barack (1970)
- (Peru) Jesús Peláez (1972–1973)

== See also ==
- List of football clubs in Peru
- Peruvian football league system
