= Cercado de Lima =

Historic quarter of Lima, Peru

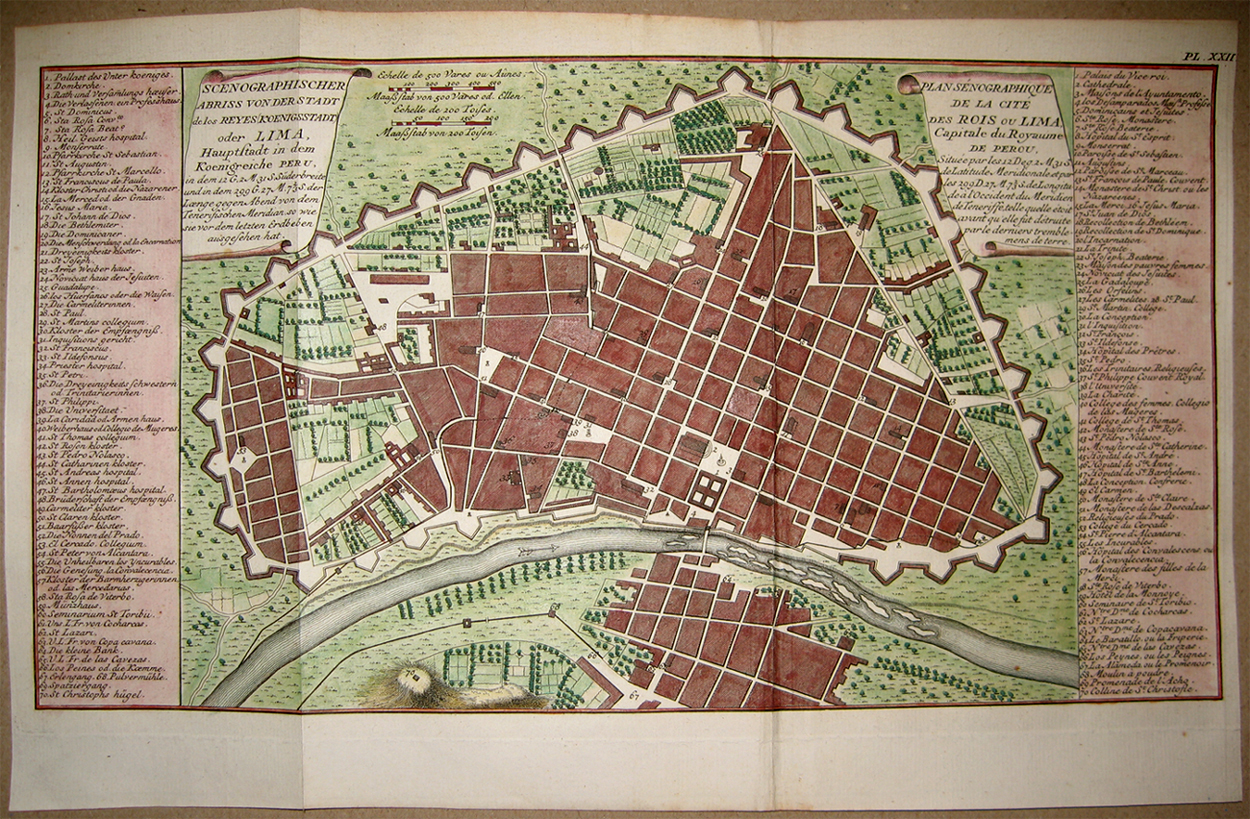
Map of Lima in 1750.

The Cercado de Lima ('Walled Lima'), Damero de Pizarro ('Pizarro's Checkerboard'), or Lima Cuadrada ('Squared Lima') is an area of the historic center of Lima (capital of Peru) located within the old walls of the city.

The area of the Cercado de Lima corresponds to the original layout of the city. It contains the main historical monuments of the city and several of the public buildings of the government of Peru including the Government Palace and the Metropolitan Cathedral of Lima.

== Name and boundaries ==
The area's current boundaries within the city are the Rímac River to the north, Abancay Avenue to the east, Colmena Avenue to the south and Tacna Avenue to the west.

Its name derives from it being the oldest and most central part of the city and because its urban layout maintains the classic Spanish style of streets and perpendicular avenues that form homogeneously square blocks.

== See also ==
- Historic Centre of Lima
- Grid plan
