= Sport in Peru =

Sports in Peru are popular and widespread.

== Football ==
Football is the most popular sport in Peru, and the Peru national football team have competed in the FIFA World Cup five times.

- 1930
- 1970 (Quarter-finals)
- 1978 (Quarter-finals)
- 1982
- 2018

The national team has also won two Copa América trophies: 1939 and 1975.

At the club level there are significant achievements such as the Cienciano championships in the 2003 Copa Sudamericana and in the 2004 Recopa Sudamericana. The Simon Bolivar Cup won by Defensor Lima and Alianza Lima in 1974 and 1976 respectively, in addition to the Copa Libertadores U-20 championship won by Universitario de Deportes in 2011.

=== Club competitions ===
==== Peruvian Primera División ====
The Peru First Division is the top flight of association football in Peru.

===== List of champions =====
Season	Champion
1912	Lima Cricket
1913	Jorge Chávez N°1
1914	Lima Cricket
1915	Sport José Gálvez
1916	Sport José Gálvez
1917	Sport Juan Bielovucic
1918	Sport Alianza
1919	Sport Alianza
1920	Sport Inca
1921	Sport Progreso
1922–25	No Tournament
1926	Sport Progreso
1927	Alianza Lima
1928	Alianza Lima
1929	Federación Universitaria
1930	Atlético Chalaco
1931	Alianza Lima
1932	Alianza Lima
1933	Alianza Lima
1934	Universitario
1935	Sport Boys
1936	No Tournament
1937	Sport Boys
1938	Deportivo Municipal
1939	Universitario
1940	Deportivo Municipal
1941	Universitario
1942	Sport Boys
1943	Deportivo Municipal
1944	Sucre
1945	Universitario
1946	Universitario
1947	Atlético Chalaco
1948	Alianza Lima
1949	Universitario
1950	Deportivo Municipal
1951	Sport Boys
1952	Alianza Lima
1953	Mariscal Sucre
1954	Alianza Lima
1955	Alianza Lima
1956	Sporting Cristal
1957	Centro Iqueño
1958	Sport Boys
1959	Universitario
1960	Universitario
1961	Sporting Cristal
1962	Alianza Lima
1963	Alianza Lima
1964	Universitario
1965	Alianza Lima
1966	Universitario
1967	Universitario
1968	Sporting Cristal
1969	Universitario
1970	Sporting Cristal
1971	Universitario
1972	Sporting Cristal
1973	Defensor Lima
1974	Universitario
1975	Alianza Lima
1976	Unión Huaral
1977	Alianza Lima
1978	Alianza Lima
1979	Sporting Cristal
1980	Sporting Cristal
1981	Melgar
1982	Universitario
1983	Sporting Cristal
1984	Sport Boys
1985	Universitario
1986	San Agustín
1987	Universitario
1988	Sporting Cristal
1989	Unión Huaral
1990	Universitario
1991	Sporting Cristal
1992	Universitario
1993	Universitario
1994	Sporting Cristal
1995	Sporting Cristal
1996	Sporting Cristal
1997	Alianza Lima
1998	Universitario
1999	Universitario
2000	Universitario
2001	Alianza Lima
2002	Sporting Cristal
2003	Alianza Lima
2004	Alianza Lima
2005	Sporting Cristal
2006	Alianza Lima
2007	Universidad San Martín
2008	Universidad San Martín
2009	Universitario
2010	Universidad San Martín
2011	Juan Aurich
2012	Sporting Cristal
2013	Universitario
2014	Sporting Cristal
2015	Melgar
2016	Sporting Cristal
2017	Alianza Lima
2018	Sporting Cristal
2019	Binacional
2020	Sporting Cristal
2021	Alianza Lima

==== Peruvian Segunda División ====
The Liga 2 (Ligue 2) of Peru is the second-highest division in the Peruvian football league system.

== Volleyball ==
The Peru women's national volleyball team is the national team of Peru. The team was one of the dominant forces in women's volleyball in the 1980s, culminating in the silver medal won at the 1988 Summer Olympics in Seoul, South Korea. Peru has a volleyball league called the Liga Nacional Superior de Voleibol, which has both men's and women's competitions, the winners move into South American competitions. It was founded in 1965 and the current teams with the most winners are Peerless in the men's division, and Regatas Lima for the women's division, each with eight champions won.

=== Introduction of volleyball in Peru ===
Volleyball was introduced in Peru in 1911, with the hiring by the government of President Augusto B. Leguía of American educators Joseph Lockey and Joseph McKnight, responsible for an educational reform, and that he practiced it as a hobby, since in those years football and boxing predominated.

== Basketball ==
Until the mid-70s, Peru had one of the best basketball national teams in South America. However, since the 1973 South American Basketball Championship, where Peru won the bronze medal, international victories have become scarce.

== Horse racing ==
Horse racing, known in Spanish as "turf" is administered by the Jockey Club del Perú (JCP). The Peruvian Quadruple Crown is held at Lima's Hipódromo de Monterrico, and another racecourse is located in Arequipa. The history of the sport in the country dates back to the mid-19th century, when it was introduced by the country's British community.

== Surfing ==
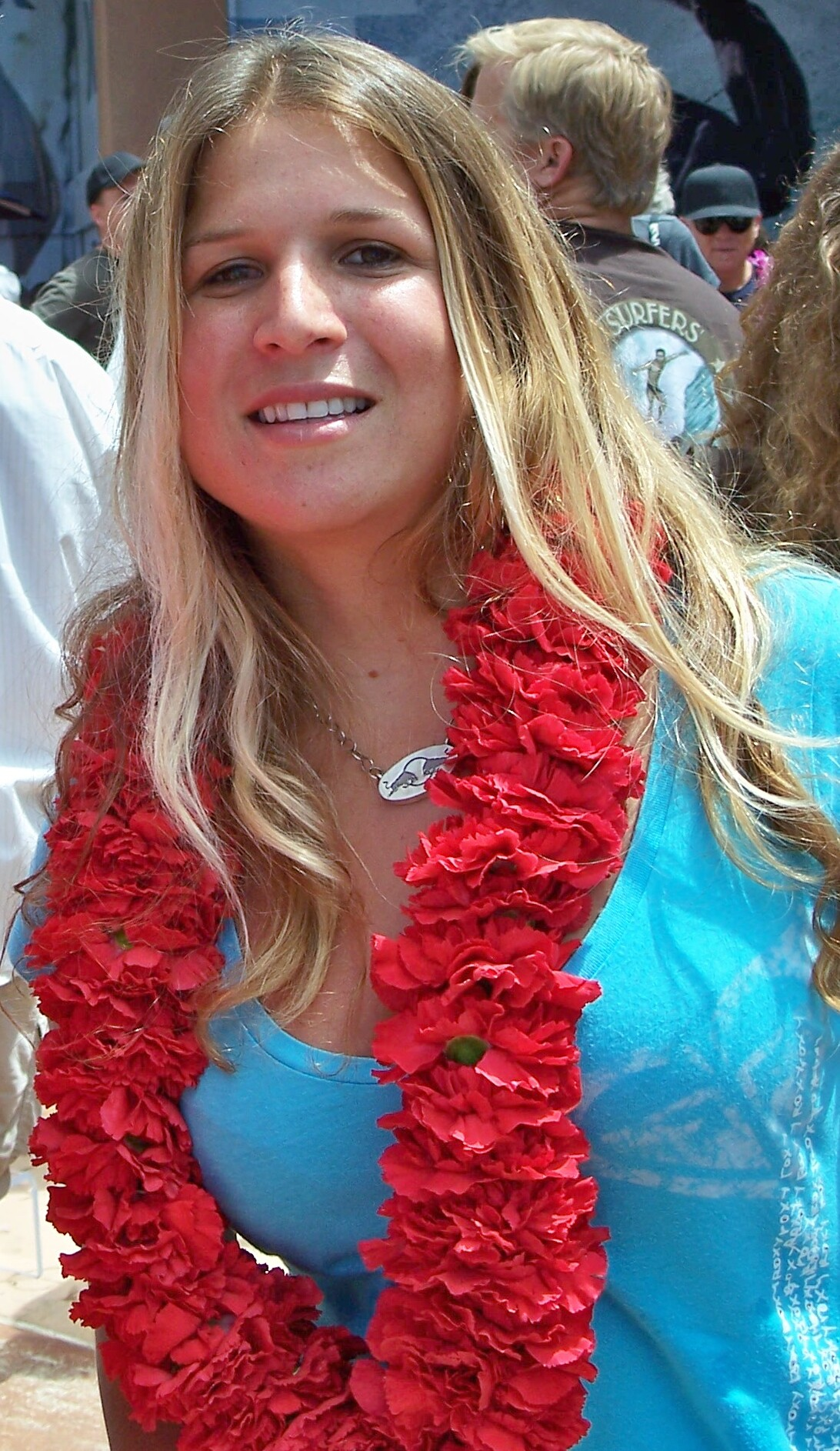
Sofía Mulánovich

For travelers from all over the world, Peru offers waves for everyone: beginners, intermediate, and advanced longboard riders alike surfers. Felipe Pomar, Second World Surfing Championship, Peru 1965, and Sofia Mulanovich, Women's World Surf Champion in 2004.

== Sailing ==
Peru is the only country of the region that has won the Central, South American & Caribbean Championships for six years in Sunfish Class. In the Optimist Class, it was three times World Champion in Team-Racing in 1997 and 1998, and have more South American Champions in J24, Windsurf, Laser Class and Lightning.

== Shooting ==
Peru's four Olympic medals achievements include three in shooting. Edwin Vásquez won Peru's only gold medal in the 1948 Summer Olympics, while Francisco Boza (Los Angeles 1984), and Juan Giha (Barcelona 1992) both won silver medals.

== Taekwondo ==
Taekwondo was introduced in Peru by Hakeem Aanders Polar, an Arequipeños instructor master the art of Taekwondo in Cochabamba, Bolivia, and introduced this form of martial art in the early 1970s. The first Taekwondo Clubs in Peru were to be found in Arequipa.

In the late 1970s, Sa Bum Nim Byon Oh Park introduced taekwondo in Lima. In 1979, Sa Bum Nim Jon Hye, after a few years spent in Argentina also joined Byon Oh Park in disseminating taekwondo in Lima.

Simultaneously to these two, John Polar and Byon Oh Park, Alex Velazques was doing taekwondo with a reduced number of practices along with "La Yegua" Leiblinger who later moved to Argentina.

It was Byon Oh Park, who introduced the regulated form of taekwondo and started to teach to some new taekwondo instructors. Of those, Percy Vergara and Juan Infantas were the YUHmain instructors and the ones who started the dissemination of taekwondo to bigger audiences. Both Percy Vergara and Juan Infantas started to run a Taekwondo Club in the San Marcos University. They also opened up a new club, Black Belt Taekwondo Club where most of their best students from San Marcos continued training.

In 1982, the first open martial arts competition was run. In this competition, practitioners from kung fu, karate, kyokushinkai and other styles, along with taekwondo took part. It was the first time taekwondo athletes were to take part in any open national event.

After this experience taekwondo grew up in popularity and a number of clubs and academies started to flourish. In 1981, Saboming Ki Hyung Lee arrived to Peru and joined forces into making this sport even more popular. Percy Vergara started clubs in Regattas Lima, as Cesar Landeo started one in the Engineering National University (UNI) where he graduated as Electrical engineer. The UNI team has won more than 10 university championships between 1981 and 1994 at the university level. Other taekwondo Clubs appeared and flourished, thanks also to the contribution of Ki Bong Lee, So Yong Kim and Eui Hwang Chung.

In the south of Peru, taekwondo was disseminated by Professor Alberto Cabrera Cano, Angle Leon, while in the north by Professor Luis Benites.

Today taekwondo, although it has lost the prestige it had by the mid-1990s remains steadfast and efforts are made to return the sport in Peru to its previous level of prestige.

The Peru 2008 Summer Olympics team included Peter López; he finished at fourth place.

== Tennis ==
Luis Horna and Jaime Yzaga are well-known Peru-born tennis players. Tennis Hall of Famer and Davis Cup and Wimbledon winner Alejandro Olmedo is Peru-born, but played for the United States. Laura Arraya is the best Peruvian tennis player in the women's competition. Her brother is Pablo Arraya, a former Peruvian tennis player.

The Peru Davis Cup team currently compete in the Americas Zone Group II, with their best result qualifying for the World Group in 2008. They had twice previously reached the World Group playoffs in 1989 and 1994, but did not advance.

Club Lawn Tennis de la Exposición is located in the district of Jesús María in Lima, the usual court location for Peru's players. The court was found in 1884, and was the home court for the golden generation of Peru's tennis players of the 1980s. Its principal colosseum was named after the Buse Brothers, Enrique and Eduardo Buse. Enrique played at Wimbledon and the US Open in 1946 and again at the US Open in 1951.

== Rugby ==
=== Rugby league ===
While no Rugby league has been played on Peru soil, Peru has a National Rugby league team. They made their debut on 17 October 2015 in the first Latino Seven competition.

=== Rugby union ===
On 30 November 1996, the first university test match saw the Universidad de Lima win 18 to 3 against the Pontificia Universidad Catolica. This match also has the distinction of being the first time that the participants on the pitch including team members and the referee were Peru-born.

== Water polo ==
Peru features a water polo team that finished fourth at the 2018 South American Games.

Peru's women's national under-20 water polo team made its debut at the 2021 FINA Junior Water Polo World Championships.

== Peru at the Olympics ==
Peru has officially participated in 17 Summer Olympic Games and 2 Winter Olympic Games. The Comité Olímpico Peruano is the National Olympic Committee for Peru which was founded in 1924 and recognized by the International Olympic Committee in 1936.

Peru has won a total of four medals, three in shooting events and one in volleyball. Their first and only gold medal to date was won by Edwin Vásquez in the 1948 Summer Olympics in the Men's 50-metre pistol. The remaining three medals were silver.
