= 1918 Liga Peruana de Football =

Peruvian Primera División
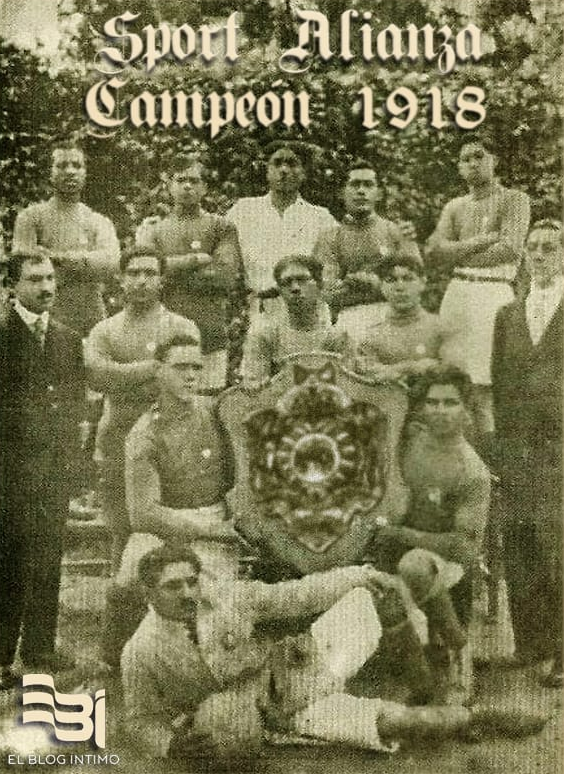
- Sport Alianza, champion
- Season: 1918
- Dates: 19 May 1918 – 17 November 1918
- Champions: Sport Alianza; 1st Primera División title
- Runner up: Jorge Chávez
- Relegated: Unión Miraflores
- Top goalscorer: Guillermo Rivero (18 goals)

The 1918 Primera División was the seventh season of top-flight Peruvian football. A total of 14 teams competed in the league, The champion was Sport Alianza. It was organized by the homonymous entity, Liga Peruana de Football (Peruvian Football League), currently known as Professional Football Sports Association.

Club Sport José Gálvez requested a license from the Liga Peruana de Football to not participate in this season and Unión Miraflores did not participate, automatically descending in category to the Peruvian Segunda División.

== Teams ==
Team	City
Alianza Chorrillos	Chorrillos, Lima
Association Alianza	La Victoria, Lima
Atlético Peruano	Rímac, Lima
Fraternal Barranco	Barranco, Lima
Jorge Chávez N°1	Cercado de Lima
Jorge Chávez	Callao
Sport Alianza	La Victoria, Lima
Sport Inca	Rímac, Lima
Sport Juan Bielovucic	Cercado de Lima
Sport Progreso	Rímac, Lima
Sport Vitarte	Ate, Lima
Sportivo Lima	Cercado de Lima
Sportivo Tarapacá	Cercado de Lima
Unión Perú	Cercado de Lima

== League table ==
=== Standings ===
Pos	Team	Pld	W	D	L	Pts	Qualification or relegation
1	Sport Alianza	26	19	3	4	41	Champions
2	Jorge Chávez	0	0	0	0	0	
3	Sportivo Tarapacá	0	0	0	0	0	
4	Alianza Chorrillos	0	0	0	0	0	
5	Fraternal Barranco	0	0	0	0	0	
6	Sport Progreso	0	0	0	0	0	
7	Sport Inca	0	0	0	0	0	
8	Atlético Peruano	0	0	0	0	0	
9	Sportivo Lima	0	0	0	0	0	
10	Unión Perú	0	0	0	0	0	
11	Sport Vitarte	0	0	0	0	0	
12	Jorge Chávez N°1	0	0	0	0	0	
13	Association Alianza	0	0	0	0	0	
14	Sport Juan Bielovucic	0	0	0	0	0	
