= 1920 Liga Peruana de Football =

Peruvian Primera División
- Season: 1920
- Champions: Sport Inca; 1st Primera División title

The 1920 Primera División was the ninth season of top-flight Peruvian football. A total of 9 teams competed in the league. The champion was Sport Inca. It was organized by the homonymous entity, Liga Peruana de Football (Peruvian Football League), currently known as Professional Football Sports Association.

The clubs of Sport Juan Bielovucic, Association FBC, Atlético Peruano, Sport Vitarte, Sport Calavera, Alianza Chorrillos, Teniente Ruiz and Nacional Juan Legía did not participate, automatically descending in category to the Peruvian Segunda División.

== Teams ==
Team	City
Association Alianza	La Victoria, Lima
Jorge Chávez N°1	Cercado de Lima
Jorge Chávez	Callao
Sport Alianza	La Victoria, Lima
Sport Huáscar	Cercado de Lima
Sport Inca	Rímac, Lima
Sport José Gálvez	La Victoria, Lima
Sport Progreso	Rímac, Lima
Sport Sáenz Peña	Callao

== League table ==
=== Standings ===
Pos	Team	Pld	W	D	L	Pts	Qualification or relegation
1	Sport Inca	0	0	0	0	0	Champions
2	Sport Progreso	0	0	0	0	0	
3	Sport Alianza	0	0	0	0	0	
4	Jorge Chávez	0	0	0	0	0	
5	Sport José Gálvez	0	0	0	0	0	
6	Jorge Chávez N°1	0	0	0	0	0	
7	Sport Huáscar	0	0	0	0	0	
8	Association Alianza	0	0	0	0	0	
9	Sport Sáenz Peña	0	0	0	0	0	
