= 1921 Liga Peruana de Football =

Season of the Peruvian Football League

Peruvian Primera División
- Season: 1921
- Champions: Sport Progreso; 1st Primera División title

The 1921 Liga Peruana de Football was the tenth and last season to be organized by the Peruvian Football League. It encompassed a first division and a second division. A total of 11 teams competed in the first division and its champion was Sport Progreso.

It was the last tournament run by the leadership of the Liga Peruana de Football, due to its lack of authority over the associated clubs. The formation of a new entity that controls sports activities, called the Asociación de Amateur, made up of dissident institutions from the Liga Peruana, produced a schism with an anarchic nature of disorder and confusion in the football organization.

On the other hand, the Asociación Deportiva Chalaca fought against the Liga Peruana, insinuating the bankruptcy of the sports unit, generating discord and personal animosities among the leaders of Peruvian football, for which reason, the directors of the Liga Peruana opted to disaffiliate from the highest controlling body, which was Federación Atlética Deportiva. This entity, with which the three controlling organizations of the clubs, had engaged in a merciless fight for football predominance, arranging matches and tournaments among their affiliates, only managing to divide the fans with their attitude, so they decided to reorganize Peruvian football.

Then, Mr. Alfredo Benavides Canseco, President of the Federación Atlética y Deportiva makes a public call to all club groups, in order to restore union and harmony in Peruvian football under other molds. It is so, that on August 23, 1922, the date on which the Leagues and Associations Fusion took place under a single guiding entity in a climate of tranquility and understanding of all interested parties, seeing as a result the constitution of the Peruvian Football Federation, under the leadership of Mr. Claudio Martínez Bodero, President of Club Atlético Chalaco del Callao.

In the month of July 1924, the Fédération internationale de football association (FIFA) officially recognized it, becoming part of this highest international sports organization.

The clubs of Unión Miraflores and the Escuela de Artes y Oficios de Lima did not participate, automatically descending in category to the Peruvian Segunda División.

== Teams ==
Team	City
Association Alianza	La Victoria, Lima
Jorge Chávez N°1	Cercado de Lima
Jorge Chávez	Callao
Sport Alianza	La Victoria, Lima
Sport Huáscar	Cercado de Lima
Sport Inca	Rímac, Lima
Sport José Gálvez	La Victoria, Lima
Sport Juan Bielovucic	Cercado de Lima
Sport Progreso	Rímac, Lima
Sport Sáenz Peña	Callao
Unión Barranco	Barranco, Lima

== League table ==
=== Standings ===
Pos	Team	Pld	W	D	L	Pts	Qualification or relegation
1	Sport Progreso	0	0	0	0	0	Champions
2	Jorge Chávez	0	0	0	0	0	
3	Sport Alianza	0	0	0	0	0	
4	Sport Inca	0	0	0	0	0	
5	Jorge Chávez N°1	0	0	0	0	0	
6	Sport José Gálvez	0	0	0	0	0	
7	Sport Juan Bielovucic	0	0	0	0	0	
8	Sport Sáenz Peña	0	0	0	0	0	
9	Sport Huáscar	0	0	0	0	0	
10	Unión Barranco	0	0	0	0	0	
11	Association Alianza	0	0	0	0	0	
