= 1917 Liga Peruana de Football =

Peruvian Primera División
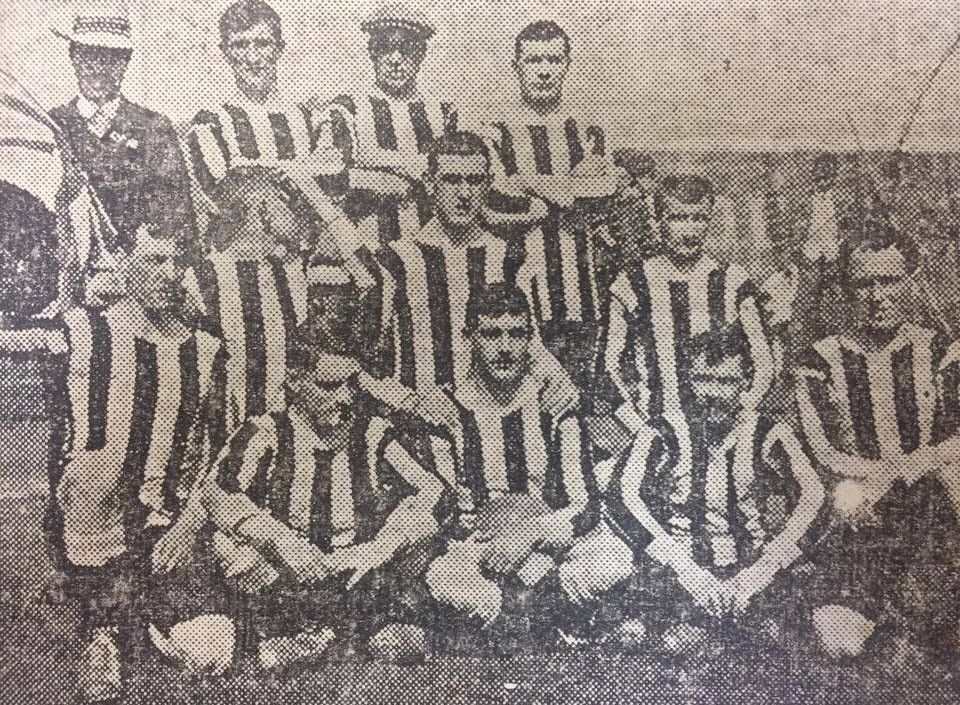
- Sport Juan Bielovucic, champion
- Season: 1917
- Champions: Sport Juan Bielovucic; 1st Primera División title
- Runner up: Sport Alianza
- Relegated: Escuela de Artes y Oficios

The 1917 Primera División was the sixth season of top-flight Peruvian football. A total of 13 teams competed in the league, The champion was Sport Juan Bielovucic. It was organized by the homonymous entity, Liga Peruana de Football (Peruvian Football League), currently known as Professional Football Sports Association.

== Teams ==
Team	City
Alianza Chorrillos	Chorrillos, Lima
Atlético Peruano	Rímac, Lima
Escuela de Artes y Oficios	Cercado de Lima
Fraternal Barranco	Barranco, Lima
Jorge Chávez N°1	Cercado de Lima
Jorge Chávez	Callao
Sport Alianza	La Victoria, Lima
Sport Inca	Rímac, Lima
Sport José Gálvez	La Victoria, Lima
Sport Juan Bielovucic	Cercado de Lima
Sportivo Tarapacá	Cercado de Lima
Unión Miraflores	Miraflores, Lima
Unión Perú	Cercado de Lima

== League table ==
=== Standings ===
Pos	Team	Pld	W	D	L	Pts	Qualification or relegation
1	Sport Juan Bielovucic	0	0	0	0	0	Champions
2	Sport Alianza	0	0	0	0	0	
3	Unión Miraflores	0	0	0	0	0	
4	Sportivo Tarapacá	0	0	0	0	0	
5	Jorge Chávez N°1	0	0	0	0	0	
6	Unión Perú	0	0	0	0	0	
7	Sport José Gálvez	0	0	0	0	0	
8	Sport Inca	0	0	0	0	0	
9	Alianza Chorrillos	0	0	0	0	0	
10	Fraternal Barranco	0	0	0	0	0	
11	Atlético Peruano	0	0	0	0	0	
12	Jorge Chávez	0	0	0	0	0	
13	Escuela de Artes y Oficios	0	0	0	0	0	1918 Segunda División
