= 1916 Liga Peruana de Football =

Peruvian Primera División
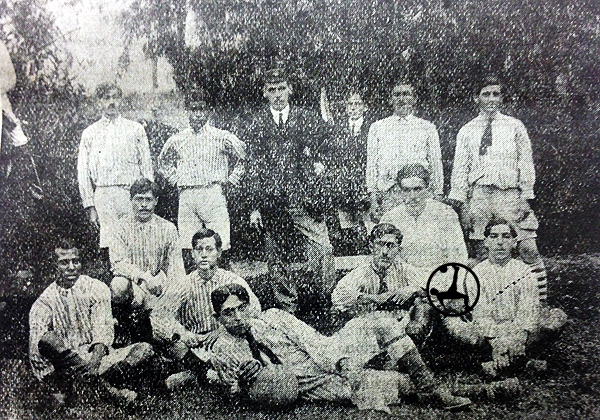
- 1916 Champion, Sport José Gálvez
- Season: 1916
- Dates: 21 May 1916 – 9 October 1916
- Champions: Sport José Gálvez; 2nd Primera División title

The 1916 Primera División was the fifth season of top-flight Peruvian football. Nine teams competed in the league. The champion was Sport José Gálvez. It was organized by the homonymous entity, Liga Peruana de Football (Peruvian Football League), currently known as Professional Football Sports Association.

== Teams ==
| Team | City |
|---|---|
| Atlético Peruano | Rímac, Lima |
| Jorge Chávez N°1 | Cercado de Lima |
| Jorge Chávez | Callao |
| Sport Juan Bielovucic | Cercado de Lima |
| Sport Alianza | La Victoria, Lima |
| Sport Inca | Rímac, Lima |
| Sport José Gálvez | La Victoria, Lima |
| Sport Tacna N°1 | Cercado de Lima |
| Unión Miraflores | Miraflores, Lima |

== League table ==
=== Standings ===
| Pos | Team | Pld | W | D | L | Pts | Qualification or relegation |
|---|---|---|---|---|---|---|---|
| 1 | Sport José Gálvez | 0 | 0 | 0 | 0 | 0 | Champions |
| 2 | Jorge Chávez N°1 | 0 | 0 | 0 | 0 | 0 | |
| 3 | Sport Alianza | 0 | 0 | 0 | 0 | 0 | |
| 4 | Unión Miraflores | 0 | 0 | 0 | 0 | 0 | |
| 5 | Sport Juan Bielovucic | 0 | 0 | 0 | 0 | 0 | |
| 6 | Atlético Peruano | 0 | 0 | 0 | 0 | 0 | |
| 7 | Sport Inca | 0 | 0 | 0 | 0 | 0 | |
| 8 | Jorge Chávez | 0 | 0 | 0 | 0 | 0 | |
| 9 | Sport Tacna N°1 | 0 | 0 | 0 | 0 | 0 | 1917 Segunda División |

== Results ==
=== Round 1 ===
| Team 1 | Score | Team 2 |
|---|---|---|
| Sport José Gálvez | 1–0 | Jorge Chávez N°1 |
