= 1915 Liga Peruana de Football =

Peruvian Primera División
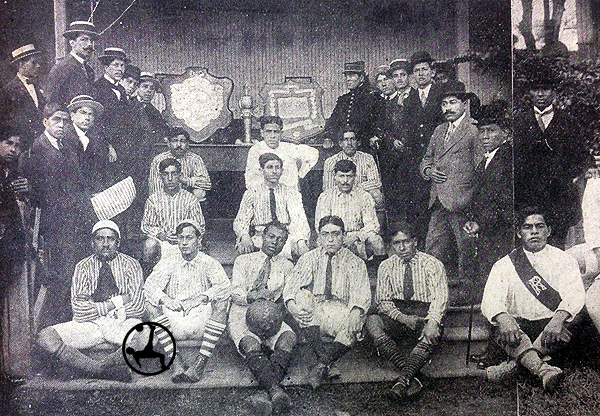
- 1915 champion, Sport José Gálvez
- Season: 1915
- Dates: May 1915 – 21 November 1915
- Champions: Sport José Gálvez; 1st Primera División title
- Relegated: Lima Cricket; Atlético Grau N°1; Sporting Fry

The 1915 Primera División was the fourth season of top-flight Peruvian football. A total of 7 teams competed in the league, The champion was Sport José Gálvez.It was organized by the homonymous entity, Liga Peruana de Football (Peruvian Football League), currently known as Professional Football Sports Association.

Club Jorge Chávez N°1 requested a license from the Liga Peruana de Football to not participate in this season and the clubs Atlético Grau N°1 and Lima Cricket withdrew from the tournament and were relegated to the Segunda División. Because several teams withdrew from the tournament, Sporting Fry, which had to be relegated the previous year, took the place of one of them.

== Teams ==
Team	City
Atlético Peruano	Rímac, Lima
Jorge Chávez	Callao
Sport Alianza	La Victoria, Lima
Sport Inca	Rímac, Lima
Sport José Gálvez	La Victoria, Lima
Sporting Fry	Cercado de Lima
Unión Miraflores	Miraflores, Lima

== League table ==
=== Standings ===
Pos	Team	Pld	W	D	L	Pts	Qualification or relegation
1	Sport José Gálvez	0	0	0	0	0	Champions
2	Atlético Peruano	0	0	0	0	0	
3	Sport Alianza	0	0	0	0	0	
4	Unión Miraflores	0	0	0	0	0	
5	Sport Inca	0	0	0	0	0	
6	Jorge Chávez	0	0	0	0	0	
7	Sporting Fry	0	0	0	0	0	1916 Segunda División

== Results ==
=== Round ===
Team 1	Score	Team 2
Sport José Gálvez	4–1	Atlético Peruano
