= 1919 Liga Peruana de Football =

Peruvian Primera División
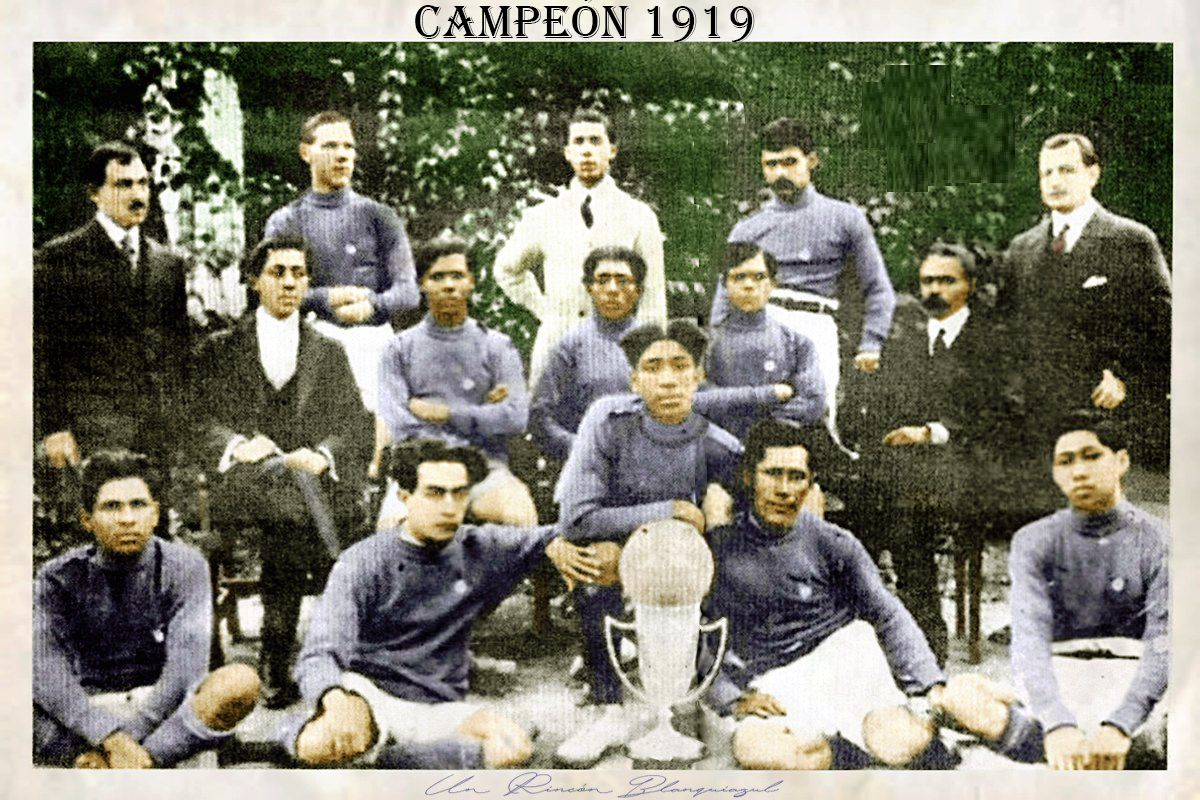
- Sport Alianza, champion
- Season: 1919
- Dates: 13 April 1919 – 16 November 1919
- Champions: Sport Alianza; 2nd Primera División title
- Runner up: Sáenz Peña
- Top goalscorer: Guillermo Rivero (15 goals)

The 1918 Primera División was the eighth season of top-flight Peruvian football. A total of 14 teams competed in the league, The champion was Sport Alianza. It was organized by the homonymous entity, Liga Peruana de Football (Peruvian Football League), currently known as Professional Football Sports Association.

The clubs Sportivo Tarapacá, Fraternal Barranco, Sportivo Lima and Unión Perú did not participate, automatically descending in category to the Peruvian Segunda División.

== Teams ==
Team	City
Alianza Chorrillos	Chorrillos, Lima
Association Alianza	La Victoria, Lima
Atlético Peruano	Rímac, Lima
Jorge Chávez N°1	Cercado de Lima
Jorge Chávez	Callao
Sport Alianza	La Victoria, Lima
Sport Calavera	Surco, Lima
Sport Huáscar	Cercado de Lima
Sport Inca	Rímac, Lima
Sport José Gálvez	La Victoria, Lima
Sport Juan Bielovucic	Cercado de Lima
Sport Progreso	Rímac, Lima
Sport Sáenz Peña	Callao
Sport Vitarte	Ate, Lima

== League table ==
=== Standings ===
Pos	Team	Pld	W	D	L	Pts	Qualification or relegation
1	Sport Alianza	26	17	5	4	39	Champions
2	Sport Sáenz Peña	0	0	0	0	0	
3	Sport Juan Bielovucic	0	0	0	0	0	
4	Sport Vitarte	0	0	0	0	0	
5	Atlético Peruano	0	0	0	0	0	
6	Sport Progreso	0	0	0	0	0	
7	Sport Inca	0	0	0	0	0	
8	Jorge Chávez	0	0	0	0	0	
9	Sport José Gálvez	0	0	0	0	0	
10	Association Alianza	0	0	0	0	0	
11	Jorge Chávez N°1	0	0	0	0	0	
11	Sport Huáscar	0	0	0	0	0	
13	Sport Calavera	0	0	0	0	0	
14	Alianza Chorrillos	0	0	0	0	0	
