= 1912 Liga Peruana de Football =

Peruvian Primera División
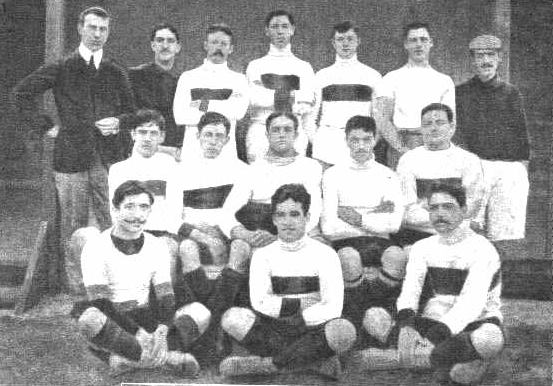
- 1912 champion, Lima Cricket
- Season: 1912
- Dates: 5 May 1912 – 8 September 1912
- Champions: Lima Cricket; 1st Primera División title
- Runner up: Association
- Relegated: Sport Vitarte; Escuela Militar de Chorrillos

The 1912 Primera División was the first season of top-flight Peruvian football. A total of 16 teams competed in the league, The champion was Lima Cricket. This first season with organised league, covering Lima, Callao, and suburbs such as Miraflores and Barranco. It was organized by the homonymous entity, Liga Peruana de Football (Peruvian Football League), currently known as Professional Football Sports Association.

The inaugural season in 1912 established two divisions; Primera División and Segunda División, both of 8 clubs. The Primera División composed of Lima Cricket, Association FBC, Miraflores Sporting, Jorge Chávez N°1, Sport Alianza, Escuela Militar de Chorrillos, Sport Inca and Sport Vitarte while the Segunda División composed Atlético Grau N°1, Atlético Peruano, Carlos Tenaud N°1, Carlos Tenaud N°2, Sport Libertad Barranco, Sport Magdalena, Sporting Lima y Unión Miraflores.

Lima Cricket and Association FBC finished equal on points; Lima Cricket were declared champions on head-to-head record; Escuela Militar de Chorrillos withdrew halfway through the season when positioned last in the Primera División with a single point. The first match was played on 5 May 1912 between Lima Cricket and Sport Vitarte. The match was a 6–1 win for Lima Cricket.

Sport José Gálvez de Lima withdrew because of not agreeing with the competition format. The clubs from Callao (among which Atlético Chalaco) did not respond to the invitation to enter.

== Teams ==
Team	City
Association FBC	Cercado de Lima
Escuela Militar de Chorrillos	Chorrillos, Lima
Jorge Chávez N°1	Cercado de Lima
Lima Cricket	Magdalena, Lima
Miraflores Sporting	Miraflores, Lima
Sport Alianza	La Victoria, Lima
Sport Inca	Rímac, Lima
Sport Vitarte	Ate, Lima

== League table ==
=== Standings ===
Pos	Team	Pld	W	D	L	Pts	Qualification or relegation
1	Lima Cricket	0	0	0	0	0 (Note: LIMA 5–0 AFBC; AFBC 0–1 LIMA)	Champions
2	Association FBC	0	0	0	0	0	
3	Jorge Chávez N°1	0	0	0	0	0	
4	Miraflores Sporting	0	0	0	0	0	
5	Sport Alianza	0	0	0	0	0	
6	Sport Inca	0	0	0	0	0	
7	Sport Vitarte	0	0	0	0	0	1913 Segunda División
8	Escuela Militar de Chorrillos	0	0	0	0	0	Retired

=== Results ===
The following list is the known results according to what was published in the newspapers El Comercio, La Prensa and La Crónica.

Home \ Away	ASS	MCH	JC1	LCR	MIR	ALI	INC	VIT
Association FBC		—	—	—	—	—	0–1	—
Escuela Militar de Chorrillos	—		—	—	0–2	—	—	—
Jorge Chávez N°1	—	—		—	—	2–0	—	—
Lima Cricket	—	—	—		—	—	2–0	6–1
Miraflores Sporting	—	—	—	—		3–0	—	—
Sport Alianza	—	W.O.	—	—	—		1–0	3–0
Sport Inca	—	—	—	—	—	—		—
Sport Vitarte	—	—	—	—	0–1	—	—	

Updated to match(es) played on unknown. Source: Diario El Comercio, La Prensa and La Crónica
Legend: Blue = home team win; Yellow = draw; Red = away team win.

==== Round 1 ====
Team 1	Score	Team 2
Lima Cricket	6–1	Sport Vitarte
Association FBC	0–1	Sport Inca
Jorge Chávez N°1	2–0	Sport Alianza
Escuela Militar de Chorrillos	0–2	Miraflores Sporting

==== Round 2 ====
Team 1	Score	Team 2
Sport Vitarte	0–1	Miraflores Sporting
Sport Alianza	1–0	Sport Inca

==== Round 3 ====
Team 1	Score	Team 2
Miraflores Sporting	3–0	Sport Alianza

==== Round 4 ====
Team 1	Score	Team 2
Lima Cricket	–	Sport Alianza

==== Round 5 ====
Team 1	Score	Team 2
Sport Alianza	3–0	Sport Vitarte

==== Round 6 ====
Team 1	Score	Team 2
Lima Cricket	2–0	Sport Inca
Association FBC	–	Sport Alianza

==== Round 7 ====
Team 1	Score	Team 2
Association FBC	0–1	Lima Cricket
Sport Alianza	W.O.	Escuela Militar de Chorrillos
