= 1913 Liga Peruana de Football =

Peruvian Primera División
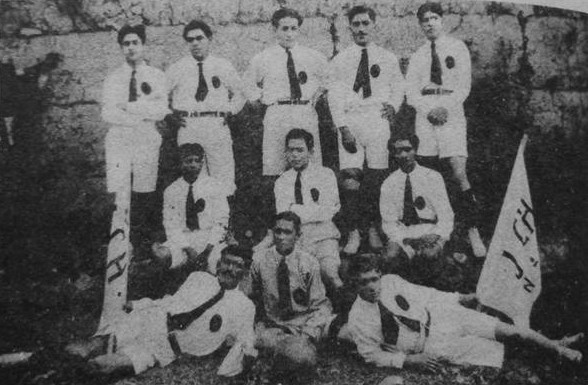
- 1913 champion, Jorge Chávez
- Season: 1913
- Champions: Jorge Chávez N°1; 1st Primera División title
- Relegated: Miraflores Sporting

The 1913 Primera División was the second season of top-flight Peruvian football. 7 teams competed in the league, The champion was Jorge Chávez N°1. It was organized by the homonymous entity, Liga Peruana de Football (Peruvian Football League), currently known as Professional Football Sports Association.

The Miraflores Sporting withdrew from the tournament and was relegated to the Segunda División.

== Teams ==
Team	City
Association FBC	Cercado de Lima
Atlético Grau N°1	Cercado de Lima
Jorge Chávez N°1	Cercado de Lima
Lima Cricket	Magdalena, Lima
Sport Alianza	La Victoria, Lima
Sport Inca	Rímac, Lima
Unión Miraflores	Miraflores, Lima

== League table ==
=== Standings ===
Pos	Team	Pld	W	D	L	Pts	Qualification or relegation
1	Jorge Chávez N°1	0	0	0	0	0	Champions
2	Lima Cricket	0	0	0	0	0	
3	Sport Alianza	0	0	0	0	0	
4	Association FBC	0	0	0	0	0	
5	Atlético Grau N°1	0	0	0	0	0	
6	Sport Inca	0	0	0	0	0	
7	Unión Miraflores	0	0	0	0	0	
