= Copa de Campeones del Perú =

Tournament details
- Country: Peru
- Dates: 16 November 1919
- Teams: 2

Final positions
- Champions: Sport Alianza
- Runners-up: Jorge Chávez N°1

Tournament statistics
- Matches played: 1
- Goals scored: 2 (2 per match)

The Copa de Campeones del Perú - Copa Felipe Ríos was a Peruvian football championship to be contested by the winners of Liga Peruana de Football.

Sport Alianza played two matches on the same day, the first was to define the champion of the 1919 Liga Peruana de Football and the second for the Copa de Campeones. In the Liga Peruana match they defeated Alianza Chorrillos by walk over on the last date and in the definition for the Copa de Campeones they defeated Jorge Chávez N°1.

== Champions ==
- (In bracket, title count):

Ed.	Year	Champion	Scores	Runner-up	Venue
1	1919	Sport Alianza (1)	2–0	Jorge Chávez N°1	Nacional, Lima

=== Final ===
16 November 1919

Sport Alianza	2–0	Jorge Chávez N°1
Óscar Zavala; M. Maldonado (o.g.)

Estadio Nacional, Lima

== Titles by club ==
Club	Winners	Runners-up	Winning years	Runners-up years
Sport Alianza	1	0	1919	—
Jorge Chávez N°1	0	1	—	1919
