= 1914 Liga Peruana de Football =

Peruvian Primera División
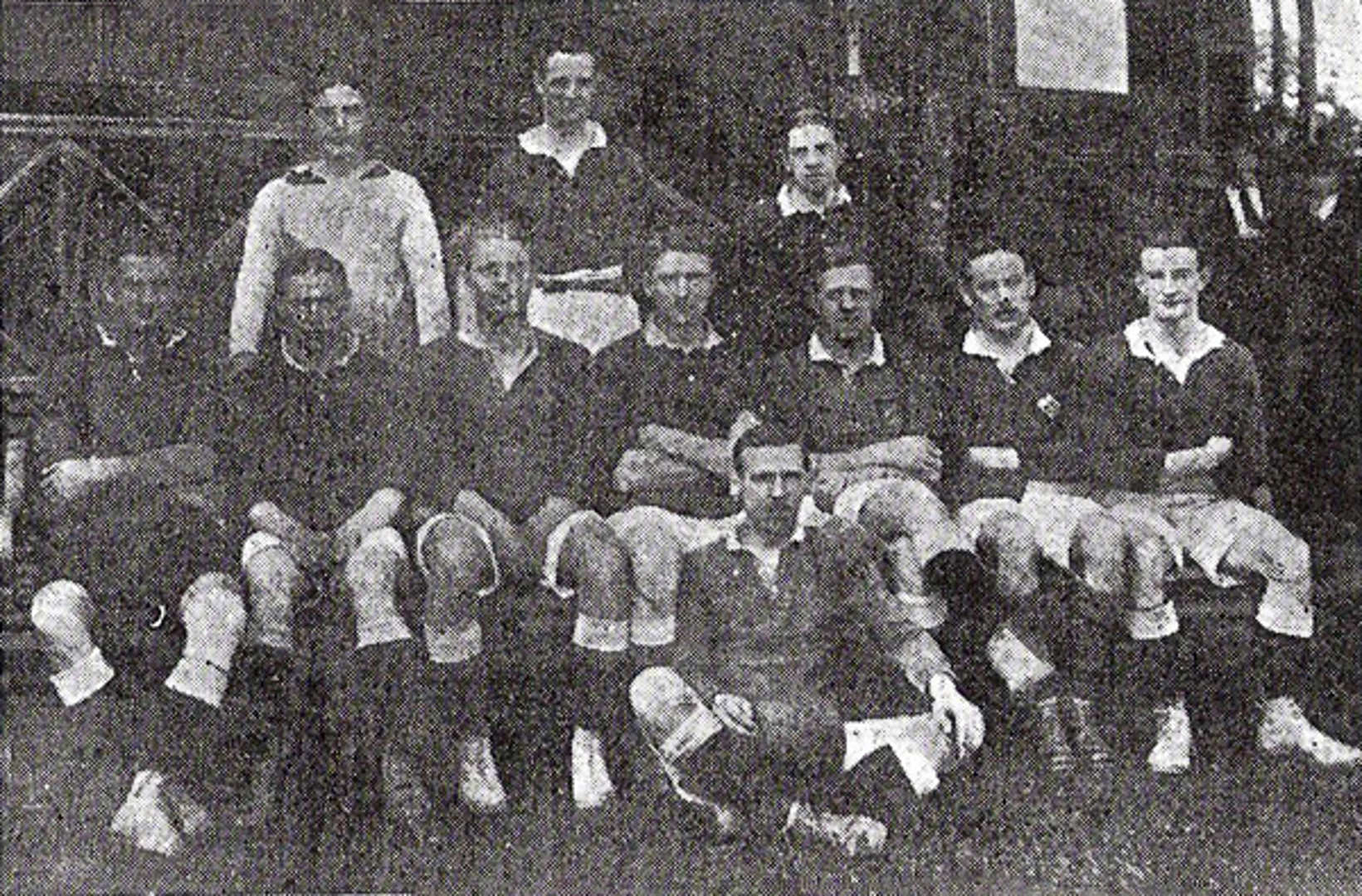
- 1914 champion, Lima Crickett
- Season: 1914
- Champions: Lima Cricket; 2nd Primera División title
- Relegated: Association FBC

The 1914 Primera División was the third season of top-flight Peruvian football. A total of 7 teams competed in the league, The champion was Lima Cricket. It was organized by the homonymous entity, Liga Peruana de Football (Peruvian Football League), currently known as Professional Football Sports Association.

The club Association FBC withdrew from the tournament and was relegated to the Segunda División.

== Teams ==
Team	City
Atlético Grau N°1	Cercado de Lima
Atlético Peruano	Rímac, Lima
Jorge Chávez N°1	Cercado de Lima
Lima Cricket	Magdalena, Lima
Sport Alianza	La Victoria, Lima
Sporting Fry	Cercado de Lima
Sport Inca	Rímac, Lima

== League table ==
=== Standings ===
Pos	Team	Pld	W	D	L	Pts	Qualification or relegation
1	Lima Cricket	0	0	0	0	0	Champions
2	Sport Alianza	0	0	0	0	0	
3	Jorge Chávez N°1	0	0	0	0	0	
4	Sport Inca	0	0	0	0	0	
5	Atlético Peruano	0	0	0	0	0	
6	Atlético Grau N°1	0	0	0	0	0	
7	Sporting Fry	0	0	0	0	0	
