= 1926 Peruvian Primera División =

Peruvian Primera División
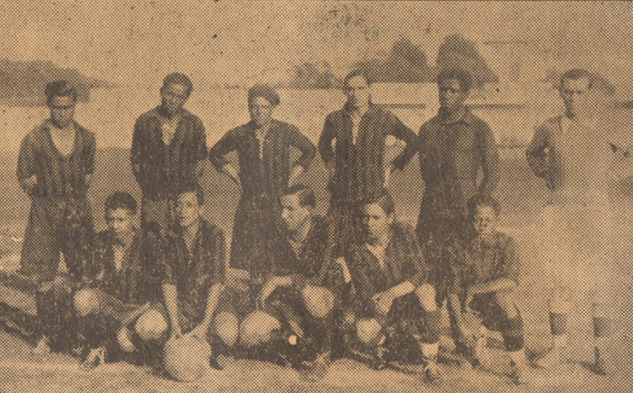
- Sport Progreso, champion
- Season: 1926
- Dates: 18 July 1926 – November 1926
- Champions: Sport Progreso (2nd title)
- Runner up: Alianza Lima
- Relegated: Sport José Gálvez; Jorge Chávez; Teniente Ruiz; Deportivo Nacional; Jorge Washington

The 1926 Primera División was the 11th season of top-flight Peruvian football. A total of 11 teams competed in the league, with Sport Progreso successfully defending their national title won in 1921. This was the first season to be organized by the Peruvian Football Federation as the Liga Peruana de Football ceased operations in 1921.

The Association FBC did not participate in the league because it had permission from the FPF to carry out a football tour to Central America.

Many matches were not played; therefore many teams were relegated and for 1927 the Primera División was reduced to 8 clubs.

== Election of teams ==
Clubs were classified into different categories according to their competitive level: First Division, First Division Subdivision or Intermediate, Second Division, and Third Division.

The 1926 First Division Championship was composed of twelve clubs, as determined by the Selection Committee, which based its decision on the teams chosen in August 1925.

In the absence of an officially recognized First Division title, the National Olympic Committee, in a well-judged decision, made an exception by including those clubs that had been embraced by the public as a true expression of popular support: Atlético Chalaco (Callao), Unión Buenos Aires (Callao), Sport Alianza (La Victoria), Association FBC (Cercado de Lima), and Sportivo Tarapacá (Lima).

A selection process was carried out to complete the remaining participating clubs, with the following results:

- The Liga Deportiva Chalaca qualified Jorge Washington and Jorge Chávez (Callao).
- The Liga Provincial de Fútbol No. 1 (former Liga Provincial) contributed Sport José Gálvez (La Victoria), Sport Progreso (Lima)—a club recognized for its prestige and competitive level—and Teniente Ruiz (La Victoria).
- The Liga de los Balnearios del Sur did not qualify any representative.
- The Liga Provincial de Fútbol No. 2 (former Asociación Amateur), Association FBC (Lima) and Sportivo Tarapacá (Lima) had already been designated based on sporting merit.

Additionally, the Selection Committee directly admitted other clubs:

- Circolo Sportivo Italiano (Pueblo Libre), as it featured players of notable quality, considered by the FPF as capable of raising the overall competitive standard of the tournament.
- Deportivo Nacional (Lima) was also included, having requested official recognition before the FPF's General Regulations came into force and boasting players with First Division experience.

However, Association FBC did not take part in the tournament, as it had been granted permission by the FPF to undertake a football tour in Central America.

== Competition format ==
The tournament was played between July 18 and November 7, 1926, featuring eleven clubs and using a single round-robin format.

It was also established that the three teams finishing in the bottom positions would be relegated to the 1927 División Intermedia, while the champion of that division would earn promotion. As a result, the First Division would consist of ten clubs for the 1927 season.

On November 14, 1926, the championship was suspended due to administrative issues, with thirteen matches still remaining to be played. At that point, the standings were led by Sport Progreso.

Subsequently, in a session held on May 2, 1927, the Peruvian Football Federation resolved to officially conclude the 1926 First Division Championship and declare Club Sport Progreso of Lima as champions, having accumulated the highest number of points at the time of suspension. This decision had already been anticipated in a resolution published in the newspaper La Crónica in January 1927.

As a consequence of the suspension, Jorge Chávez (Callao), Teniente Ruiz (La Victoria), Deportivo Nacional (Lima), Jorge Washington (Callao), and Sport José Gálvez (La Victoria) were relegated to the 1927 División Intermedia.

== Teams ==
Team	City	Qualification method
~~Association FBC~~	Cercado de Lima	Sport merits
Atlético Chalaco	Callao	Sport merits
Circolo Sportivo Italiano	Pueblo Libre, Lima	Institutional merits
Deportivo Nacional	Cercado de Lima	Institutional merits
Jorge Chávez	Callao	Liga Deportiva Chalaca
Jorge Washington	Callao	Liga Deportiva Chalaca
Sport Alianza	La Victoria, Lima	Sport merits
Sport José Gálvez	La Victoria, Lima	Liga Provincial de Fútbol N°1
Sport Progreso	Rímac, Lima	Liga Provincial de Fútbol N°1
Sportivo Tarapacá	Cercado de Lima	Sport merits
Teniente Ruiz	La Victoria, Lima	Liga Provincial de Fútbol N°1
Unión Buenos Aires	Callao	Sport merits

== League table ==
This league table is based on the publication made in the edition of the newspaper La Prensa on November 11, 1926.

=== Standings ===
Pos	Team	Pld	W	D	L	Pts	Qualification or relegation
1	Sport Progreso (C)	8	7	1	0	15	Champions
2	Sport Alianza	7	4	2	1	10	
3	Sportivo Tarapacá	8	3	3	2	9	
4	Unión Buenos Aires	8	3	3	2	9	
5	Atlético Chalaco	5	4	0	1	8	
6	Circolo Sportivo Italiano	6	4	0	2	8	
7	Jorge Chávez	9	1	5	3	7	1927 División Intermedia
8	Teniente Ruiz	8	2	3	3	7	1927 División Intermedia
9	Jorge Washington	8	2	2	4	6	1927 División Intermedia
10	Deportivo Nacional	8	0	4	4	4	1927 División Intermedia
11	Sport José Gálvez	10	1	1	8	3	1927 División Intermedia

(C) Champions

== Results ==
The following list is the known results according to what was published in the newspapers El Comercio, La Prensa and La Crónica.

Teams play each other once, either home or away. All matches were played in Lima.

Home \ Away	CHA	CSI	NAC	JCH	JWA	ALI	GAL	PRO	TAR	TEN	UBA
Atlético Chalaco			—			5–2	2–0		5–2		—
Circolo Sportivo Italiano	4–1			—		1–2		2–6		3–1	
Deportivo Nacional		—			—		—		—	2–2	
Jorge Chávez	2–3		0–0		3–2		—			—	
Jorge Washington	—	—						—	1–3		
Sport Alianza			—	4–1	1–1			0–1	—		—
Sport José Gálvez		1–7			—	—		1–5			—
Sport Progreso	—		0–0	2–0						2–0	2–1
Sportivo Tarapacá		—		1–1			3–1	—		1–0	
Teniente Ruiz	—				—	1–1	—				—
Unión Buenos Aires		—	4–1	1–1	—				—		

Updated to match(es) played on 1927. Source: Diario El Comercio, La Prensa and La Crónica
Legend: Blue = home team win; Yellow = draw; Red = away team win.

=== Round 1 ===
The round was played on 18 July 1926.

Team 1	Score	Team 2
Sport Progreso	2–0	Jorge Chávez
Sport José Gálvez	–	Teniente Ruiz

=== Round 2 ===
The round was played between 27 July and 29 July 1926.

Team 1	Score	Team 2
Sport Progreso	0–0	Deportivo Nacional
Jorge Chávez	3–2	Jorge Washington

=== Round 3 ===
The round was played on 15 August 1926.

Team 1	Score	Team 2
Circolo Sportivo Italiano	3–1	Teniente Ruiz
Jorge Chávez	0–0	Deportivo Nacional
Sport Alianza	–	Unión Buenos Aires

=== Round 4 ===
The round was played on 22 August 1926.

Team 1	Score	Team 2
Circolo Sportivo Italiano	4–1	Atlético Chalaco

=== Round 5 ===
The round was played on 29 August 1926.

Team 1	Score	Team 2
Unión Buenos Aires	1–1	Jorge Chávez

=== Round 6 ===
The round was played on 12 September 1926.

Team 1	Score	Team 2
Sportivo Tarapacá	1–0	Teniente Ruiz

=== Round 7 ===
The round was played between 24 September and 26 September 1926.

Team 1	Score	Team 2
Sport Progreso	2–0*	Teniente Ruiz

- The original result was a 1–1 draw, however, the FPF declared Sport Progreso the winner 2–0.

=== Round 8 ===
The round was played on 3 October 1926.

Team 1	Score	Team 2
Sport Progreso	6–2	Circolo Sportivo Italiano
Atlético Chalaco	5–2	Sport Alianza
Unión Buenos Aires	4–1	Deportivo Nacional
Sportivo Tarapacá	1–1	Jorge Chávez

=== Round 9 ===
The round was played on 10 October 1926.

Team 1	Score	Team 2
Sport Progreso	5–1	Sport José Gálvez
Sportivo Tarapacá	3–1	Jorge Washingthon
Atlético Chalaco	3–2	Jorge Chávez
Sport Alianza	2–1	Circolo Sportivo Italiano

=== Round 10 ===
The round was played on 12 October 1926.

Team 1	Score	Team 2
Circolo Sportivo Italiano	7–1	Sport José Gálvez
Deportivo Nacional	2–2	Teniente Ruiz
Sport Progreso	2–1	Unión Buenos Aires

=== Round 11 ===
The round was played on 17 October 1926.

Team 1	Score	Team 2
Sport Alianza	1–1	Teniente Ruiz
Atlético Chalaco	5–2	Sportivo Tarapacá
Circolo Sportivo Italiano	–	Jorge Washington

=== Round 12 ===
The round was played on 24 October 1926.

Team 1	Score	Team 2
Sportivo Tarapacá	3–1	Sport José Gálvez
Sport Alianza	4–1	Jorge Chávez
Circolo Sportivo Italiano	–	Deportivo Nacional

=== Round 13 ===
The round was played on 31 October 1926.

Team 1	Score	Team 2
Sport Alianza	1–1	Jorge Washington

=== Round 14 ===
The round was played on 7 November 1926.

Team 1	Score	Team 2
Atlético Chalaco	2–0	Sport José Gálvez

=== Round 15 ===
The round was played on 20 November 1926.

Team 1	Score	Team 2
Sport Progreso	1–0	Sport Alianza
