= Sport Sáenz Peña =

Peruvian football club

Sáenz Peña
- Full name: Club Sport Sáenz Peña
- Founded: 1906
- Ground: Telmo Carbajo; Callao, Peru
- Chairman: N. Cabrera
Home colours	Away colours	Third colours

Sáenz Peña was a Peruvian football club, located in the city of Callao. The club played in Primera Division Peruana from 1919 until 1921.

== Honours ==
=== Senior titles ===
Keys

- Record
- ^{(s)} Shared record

Type	Competition	Titles	Runner-up	Winning years	Runner-up years
National (League)	Primera División	—	1	—	1919
National (League)	Segunda División (1912–1925)	1	—	1918	—

== See also ==
- List of football clubs in Peru
- Peruvian football league system
