= Liga 1 (Peru) =

Professional association football league in Peru

Liga 1 de Fútbol Profesional
- Organising body: FPF
- Founded: 12 May 1912; 114 years ago
- First season: 1912
- Country: Peru
- Confederation: CONMEBOL
- Number of clubs: 18
- Level on pyramid: 1
- Relegation to: Liga 2
- Domestic cup(s): Copa de la Liga; Recopa Peruana
- International cups: Copa Libertadores; Copa Sudamericana
- Current champions: Universitario de Deportes (29th title) (2025)
- Most championships: Universitario de Deportes (29 titles)
- Most appearances: Leao Butrón (641)
- Top scorer: Sergio Ibarra (274)
- Broadcasters: L1MAX (Peru only); L1play (worldwide); Fox Deportes (USA only)
- Current: 2026 season

The Liga 1 de Fútbol Profesional (English: "League 1 of Professional Football"), known as Liga 1, and Liga 1 Te Apuesto for sponsorship reasons, is a professional association football league in Peru and the top tier of the Peruvian football league system. It was referred to as the Primera División prior to 2020, and Torneo Descentralizado since 1966 until 2019, when the first teams residing outside the Lima and Callao provinces were invited to compete in the inaugural league national competition.

As of the 2026 season, the league is contested by 18 teams, operating on a system of promotion and relegation determined at the end of the season with the Liga 2. Seasons run from January to December and the league is split into two short tournaments, the Apertura and Clausura. Teams that win each short tournaments face each other in a series of play-offs to determine the league champion at the end of the season. If a team wins both the Apertura and Clausura, they are automatically champion. A total of 34 games, not including the play-offs, are played per team, 17 in both the Apertura and Clausura.

The Peruvian Football League was founded on an amateur basis and organized in 1912 into the two tiers of Primera División and the Segunda División. Editions from 1912 to 1921 were played by clubs based in Lima and Callao. In 1922 the Peruvian Football Federation (FPF) was created and in 1926 it organized its first amateur championship. The Primera División became professional in 1951. In 1966, the first true national league was founded and continues. The league is organized by the Liga de Fútbol Profesional (English: Professional Football League) (LFP) and was formerly organized by the Asociación Deportiva de Fútbol Profesional (English: Professional Football Sport Association) (ADFP).

As of the win by current champion Universitario de Deportes in the 2025 season, the league championship has gone to 21 different clubs, though a majority (74 of 109 championships) have been won by just three clubs: Universitario de Deportes (29), Alianza Lima (25), and Sporting Cristal (20).

== History ==
=== First clubs ===
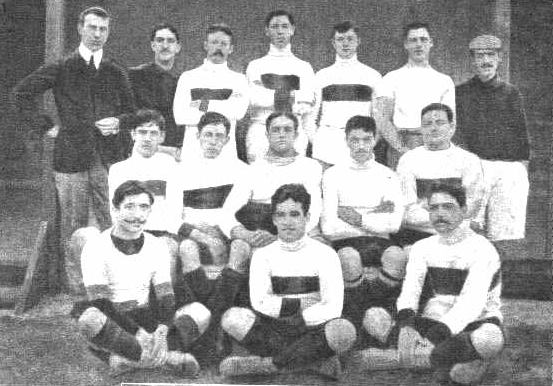
Lima Cricket, first Peruvian champion

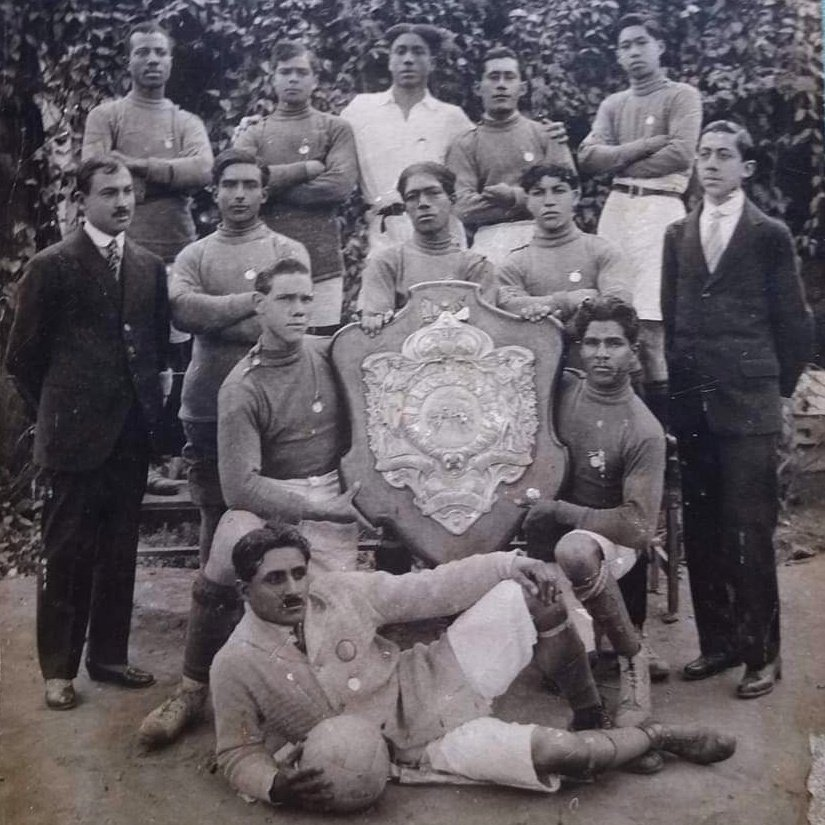
Sport Alianza with the Escudo Dewar trophy in 1918

Football was introduced in Peru in the 19th century by British residents in Lima. The early players were British residents, British sailors that stopped at the port in Callao, or upper class Peruvians who were introduced to the sport on their travels. The first recorded football match in Lima was played on 7 August 1892 between British residents and Peruvians at the club ground Santa Sofía belonging to the Lima Cricket and Lawn Tennis club. Interest in the sport slowly grew among the upper class Peruvians who established clubs, such as Lima Cricket & Lawn Tennis and Regatas Lima club dedicated their sporting activities to cricket and tennis, and aquatic sports. Additional clubs would follow: Lawn Tennis club, Unión Cricket, and Unión Ciclista Lima. Football would gain a following: Unión Cricket would be the inaugural club to include football in their activities. Other clubs would follow.

Just before the turn of the 20th century, football was encouraged among students that began to hold small inter-scholastic championships. The first football club in Peru was Association FBC, founded on 20 May 1897 by students from different schools. Several other schools and students started their own football clubs. One club founded on 9 June 1902 by cricket enthusiasts from the Instituto Chalaco was Atlético Chalaco. They started to play football and become a representative team of Callao. Conversely, some educational institutions, like Universidad San Marcos, would adopt a system of competition among clubs formed of faculty of each its colleges. Their competitions started as early as 1899. In time one faculty team would separate from the university to form their own independent football club, known today as Universitario. Clubs unaffiliated with educational institutions started to form. One of these clubs was Sport Alianza—today Alianza Lima—which was founded by Italians and Chinese of the working class of Lima in 1901 although their available records date from around 1912.

=== Creation of the Liga Peruana de Football ===
After a period of time of random play competition among clubs, the idea of a league and championship status developed. In 1912, club Sporting Miraflores invited several other clubs in Lima and Callao to participate in the formation of a football league. Those clubs that accepted established the la Liga Peruana de Fútbol (Peruvian Football League) on 12 May 1912; teams from Callao declined the invitation. The inaugural season in 1912 established two divisions; Primera División and Segunda División, both of 8 clubs. The Primera División composed of Lima Cricket, Association FBC, Miraflores Sporting, Jorge Chávez N°1, Sport Alianza, Escuela Militar de Chorrillos, Sport Inca and Sport Vitarte while the Segunda División composed Atlético Grau N°1, Atlético Peruano, Carlos Tenaud N°1, Carlos Tenaud N°2, Sport Libertad Barranco, Sport Magdalena, Sport Lima y Unión Miraflores. Lima Cricket inaugurated the tournament championship title; Association finished second.

The first edition was a relative success despite some minor setbacks. Escuela Militar de Chorrillos withdrew from the tournament in the middle of the season after only having earned 1 point. The second edition of the Liga Peruana had Jorge Chávez N°1 reach the top. The following year Lima Cricket would tally a second title. Sport José Gálvez—who refused to participate in 1912—won consecutive championships in 1915 and 1916. In 1917 Sport Juan Bielovucic championed the Liga. Sport Alianza would earn its first titles in 1918 and 1919. Sport Inca and Sport Progreso won the 1920 and 1921 seasons respectively. The league ran uninterrupted for 10 seasons until La Liga Peruana de fútbol temporarily disbanded due to disagreements. Between 1922 and 1925 no championships were played.

=== Creation of the Federación Peruana de Fútbol ===
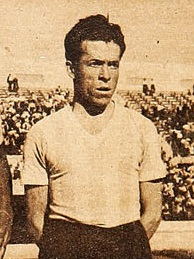
Segundo Castillo, four-time winner of the Liga 1 with Sport Boys, Deportivo Municipal and Universitario

The Peruvian Football Federation was founded in 1922 and restarted the Peruvian football league in 1926 with the addition of teams from Callao. Unfortunately, the two championships in 1926 and 1927 suffered drawback as teams withdrew from the league mid-season. Of the 11 competing teams, Sport Progreso was crowned champion. Because many clubs withdrew from the tournament, Sport Progeso only played 6 games. The following season, Alianza Lima conquered its third title; they had already won two back-to-back titles in 1918 and 1919. This season featured 8 teams. As in 1926, the league did not finish properly and Alianza Lima won after winning its 3 matches. In 1928, the federation increased the number of teams to 19 and separated them into 2 groups. 5 teams advanced to second stage where the winner was league champion. The first Clásico took place in this season. In the second stage Alianza Lima faced the newly invited Federación Universitaria. The match was a 1–0 win for Federación Universitaria and began the biggest rivalry in the history of Peruvian football. At the end of the second stage, Federación Universitaria and Alianza Lima were tied for first place which led to two extra matches between them to declare the 1928 champion. The first match was a 1–1 draw and the second was a 2–0 win for Alianza Lima.

Following a second-place finish in their first division debut, Federación Universitaria would go on to win their first title in 1929. In 1930, the federation experimented with a new format. They separated the teams in 3 groups of 4 teams. The winner of each group advanced to the championship group to define the season champion. The three finalists were Atlético Chalaco, Alianza Lima, and Federación Universitaria. Atlético Chalaco would go on to win Callao's first title. Alianza Lima won the next three seasons as Universitario de Deportes (name changed from Federación Universitaria) won the 1934 title. In 1935, the title would go back to Callao after Sport Boys–founded in 1927 and debuted in 1933–defeated the 4 teams it was competing against. In 1936, no championship was contested due to the participation of Peru in the Summer Olympics in Berlin. The championship returned in 1937 to be won by Sport Boys. The Peru national team that competed in Berlin was made up of mostly footballers who played in Sport Boys. One of the few exceptions was Teodoro Fernández who played for Universitario and scored 6 goals in 2 games. Deportivo Municipal, another club that would become a traditional team in Peruvian football, won its first championship in 1938 and a second in 1940 whilst Universitario a tallied four titles by winning in 1939 and 1941. Prior to 1939, teams played all other teams once in the course of the season. For the 1939, 1940, and 1941 seasons, teams played all others twice instead—a double round-robin tournament.

Results of the 'Big Three' in the 21st century
Season	ALI	CRI	UNI
2000	7	2	1
2001	1	6	2
2002	3	1	2
2003	1	2	9
2004	1	2	5
2005	7	1	3
2006	1	3	5
2007	5	10	4
2008	11	3	2
2009	2	10	1
2010	3	7	4
2011	2	10	14
2012	14	1	11
2013	4	3	1
2014	4	1	6
2015	9	2	7
2016	5	1	3
2017	1	8	4
2018	2	1	9
2019	2	3	4
2020	17	1	2
2021	1	2	3
2022	1	3	5
2023	2	3	1
2024	4	2	1
2025	4	3	1
TOTAL	7	7	6
Top three	14	20	13
out of 10
Champions; Second place Third place

In 1941 the Asociación No Amateur (Non-Amateur Association) took the stand as the league's organizer and renamed the league Campeonato de Selección y Competencia. In 1942, Sport Boys won a third championship, finishing one point ahead of Deportivo Municipal. In this season, a single round-robin tournament was performed but the double round-robin returned next season. Deportivo Municipal lifted their third league trophy in 1943, and began to consolidate their place in Peruvian football. In 1944, a new champion was crowned by the name of Sucre. Universitario returned to the top after winning consecutive title between 1945 and 1946. In 1947 Atlético Chalaco won its last top flight division title. 1948 saw Alianza Lima taste glory again after trophyless seasons since their conquests between 1931 and 1933. 1949 and 1950—won by Universitario and Deportivo Municipal respectively—were the last two championships played before football would become a professional sport in Peru. Between 1946 and 1949, a triple round-robin tournament was employed until in 1950 the double round-robin system made its return. Midway through the 20th century, most of the clubs which had founded La Liga Peruana de fútbol had disappeared from the top flight and five teams had become the dominant forces in Peru; Alianza Lima, Universitario de Deportes, Deportivo Municipal, Sport Boys and Atletico Chalaco.

=== Professional league and Descentralizado ===
In 1951 the top flight of Peruvian football earned professional status and the organization of the league was handed over to the ACF or Asociación Central de Fútbol (Central Football Association). Sport Boys won the first professional championship. In the next 4 years, Alianza Lima rose to conquer 3 titles in 1952, 1954 and 1955. In addition, one-time champion Sucre won a second championship in 1953. The professional era saw the rise of a new team that would rival the five dominant clubs of the amateur era. During the course of Peruvian football, Rimac-based Sporting Tabaco was a regular contender. However, in December 1955, the brewery Backus and Johnston founded Sporting Cristal to represent them in the top flight. In their debut in professional football, Sporting Cristal won their first championship in 1956. The following season, a relatively unknown club by the name of Centro Iqueño won the championship. In addition, the 1957 season employed a new tournament format. After the double round-robin stage, the 10 teams were split into 2 groups for a further 4 matches. The top 5 would play for the season title and the bottom 5 for avoiding relegation. This format would be used until 1959, and in 1964 and 1965 (a similar format would be employed in 1969 and 1970). Sport Boys won a fifth title in 1958 while Universitario won an eighth in 1959.

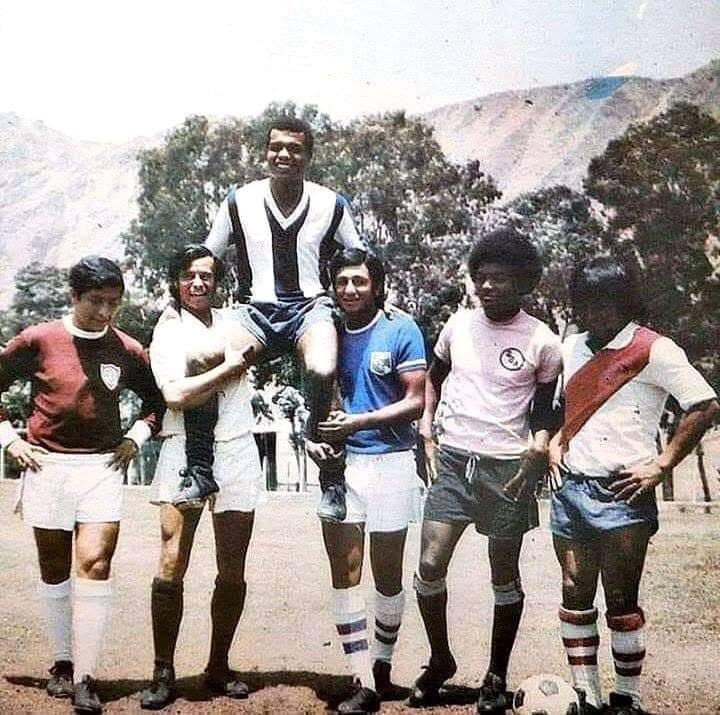
Various historic players during the 1972 season, Raúl Párraga, Oswaldo Ramírez, Teófilo Cubillas, Alfredo Quesada, Gerónimo Barbadillo, and Hugo Sotil

The 1960 season had a new attractive feature to Peruvian football; the champion would qualify to the newly created Copa de Campeones—today Copa Libertadores. Universitario de Deportes was the first Peruvian club to compete in the South American continental tournament after winning the 1960 season. In 1962 the ACF ended its run and the ADFP took its place as the current organizer of the league. In 1965, the runner-up would join the champion in the Copa Libertadores as CONMEBOL expanded the continental tournament. Up until 1965, only clubs based in Lima or Callao competed. Therefore, in 1966 the Asociación decided to expand the league outside Lima and Callao leading the championship to be renamed the Campeonato Descentralizado (Decentralized Championship). Atlético Grau of Piura, Melgar of Arequipa, Octavio Espinosa of Ica, and Alfonso Ugarte de Chiclín of Trujillo were the first four Peruvian clubs from the country interior to be invited to play in the top flight of Peruvian football, expanding it to 14 teams. The twist in this first Descentralizado was that only the best placed club outside Lima and Callao would remain in the first division; the other three would be relegated along with 1 Lima/Callao-based team. Miguel Grau—finished sixth—remained in the first division while Universitario was crowned first Descentralizado champion. With the new national championship, the Copa Perú was created to promote clubs outside the capital hub along with the Segunda División which promoted clubs from Lima and Callao. The first Copa Perú was played in 1967—prior to the start of the 1967 Descentralizado—returning Alfonso Ugarte de Chiclín and Octavio Espinoza to the top flight in addition to newcomer Juan Aurich of Chiclayo. Universitario would go on to win the second edition of the Torneo Descentralizado. However, in this season, only one club from the country interior was relegated instead of three.

In the Torneo Descentralizado's third edition, improvements were made by the teams outside the capital hub, also known as provincianos to denote the clubs originate from the provinces of Peru. Notably Juan Aurich of Chiclayo tied with Sporting Cristal at the end of the season for first place. The championship was to be defined in a single playoff match in the Estadio Nacional. Sporting Cristal won the playoff 2–1 but Juan Aurich, as runner-up, qualified for the Copa Libertadores, being the first provinciano to do so. In 1969, the tournament suffered a minor change in the format. The tournament was played with 14 teams, as had been since 1966, however after the first leg of the round robin matchups, the table was split into two parts, with the top 6 fighting for the national title and the bottom 8 avoiding relegation. Universitario won their third Descentralizado title totalizing thirteen Primera División titles.

In 1970, the national championship would modify the previous season's format. After the clubs played each other in a double round-robin tournament, the clubs would be separated into two groups of 7 each, then playing an additional double round-robin tournament to determine the champion. Sporting Cristal finished first obtaining their fourth league title, tying Deportivo Municipal's record. For the 1971 season, the championship was expanded to 16 teams. Universitario won the season title reaching fourteen Primera División titles, tying arch-rivals Alianza Lima in first division titles. Universitario's participation in the following season's Copa Libertadores would lead to an appearance in the continental finals against Independiente of Argentina, defeating Alianza Lima, Universidad de Chile and Unión San Felipe in the first group stage as well as defending champion Nacional and three-time champion Peñarol in the second group stage. In the first leg of the finals, they would draw in Lima 0–0 and lose 2–1 in Avellaneda. As in the 1972 Copa Libertadores, Universitario would finish second in the Descentralizado of 1972 to Sporting Cristal, tying Sport Boys 5 title record.

Starting in 1984, the regional leagues would be employed which would be a complex system which featured up to 40 teams from all over the country.

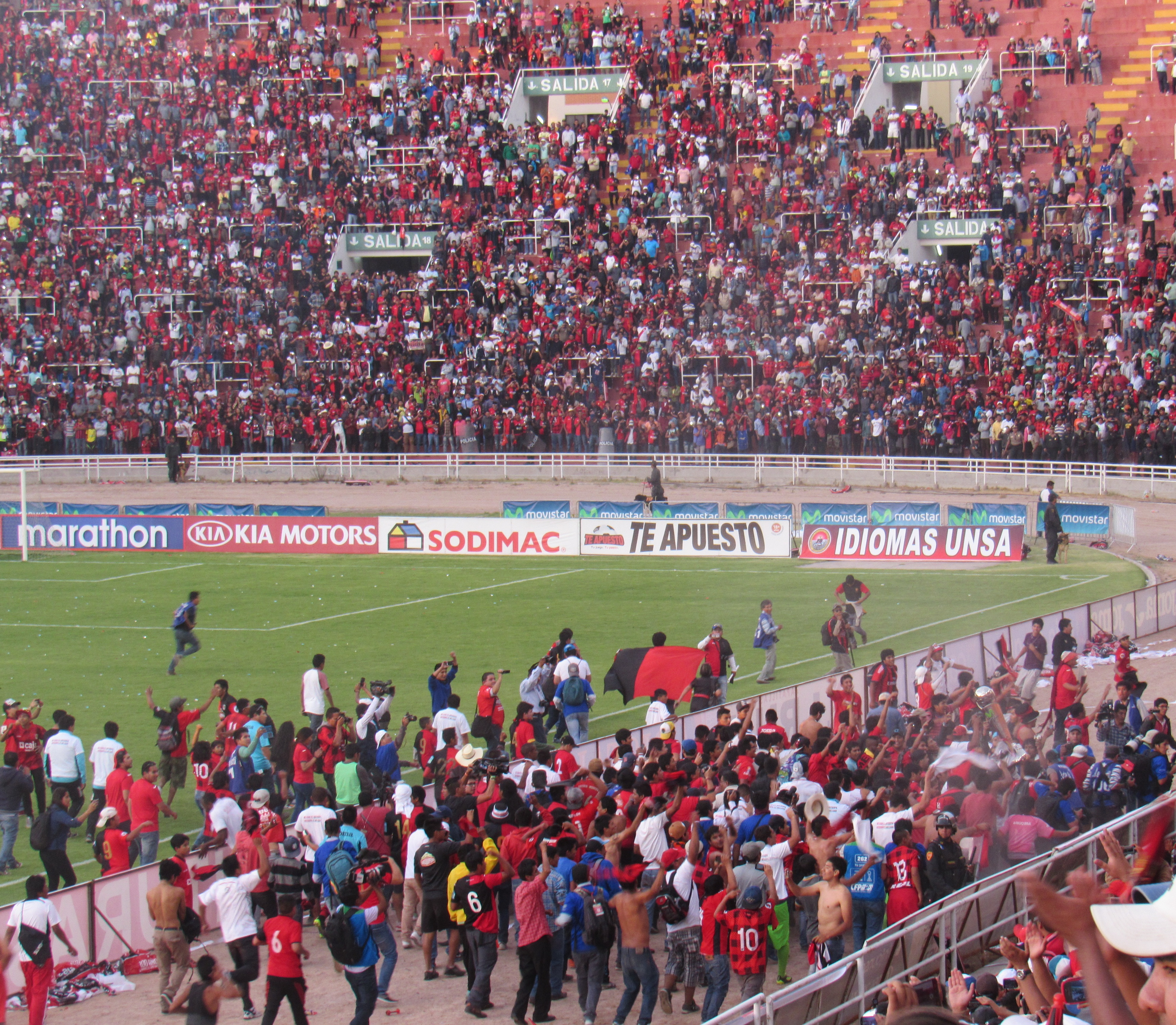
FBC Melgar celebrating their second title in 2015

In 1997 the tournament format was modified again, this time employing a similar system being used in Argentina at the time. The general idea of the system was to divide the season into two tournaments called the Apertura and Clausura tournaments. At the end of the season the tournament winners faced in a season final for the championship title. The 1997 season did not have a final after Alianza Lima won both tournaments automatically winning the 1997 title ending an 18-season title drought. At the end of the 2008 season this format was abolished due to the lack of championship playoffs in 2007 and 2008. The 2009 season employed a new liguilla format including a regular season between 16 teams which would qualify to two groups depending on their placement at the end of the regular season. The winners of each group would dispute a two-legged final at the end of the season to determine the national champion. In 2018 the Peruvian Football Federation announced that the league would be restructured from the former Torneo Descentralizado, now called the "Liga de Fútbol Profesional", later changed to "Liga 1", and organized by the national federation itself instead of the ADFP, starting with the 2019 edition.

As of 2022, Universitario, Alianza Lima and Sporting Cristal have won 26, 26 and 20 official league titles respectively. They are regarded as the Big Three of Peru. However, other teams have risen to new heights. In particular, a team from Cusco, Cienciano, has been the only Peruvian team to win international tournaments (Copa Sudamericana 2003 and Recopa Sudamericana 2004), though it has yet to win the domestic league title. Other notable teams include Melgar, Binacional, Juan Aurich and Unión Huaral, which are the only non-capital teams to have won a national championship.

== Division levels ==
Year	Level	Relegation to
1912–1921	1	Segunda División (1912–1925)
1922–1925	–	(None)
1926–1927	1	División Intermedia
1928	1	Primera B
1929–1934	1	División Intermedia
1935–1936	–	(None)
1937–1940	1	Ligas Provinciales de Lima y Callao
1941–1942	1	Liga Regional de Lima y Callao
1943–1965	1	Segunda División
1966–1972	1	Copa Perú Segunda División

Year	Level	Relegation to
1973	1	Reclasificatorio Regional
1974–1983	1	Copa Perú
1984–1987	1	Intermedia
1988–1990	1	Copa Perú Segunda División
1991	1	Torneo Zonal
1992–2004	1	Copa Perú Segunda División
2005–2018	1	Segunda División
2019–present	1	Liga 2

== Competition format and sponsorship ==
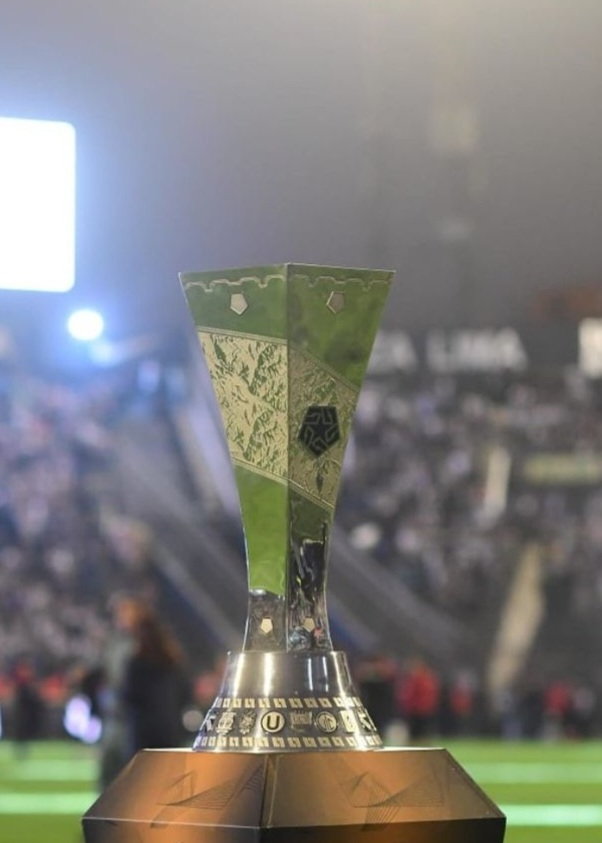
The Liga 1 trophy

=== Domestic ===
The 2024 season is played by 18 teams. The season is divided into three stages: Torneo Apertura, Torneo Clausura, and the Playoffs.

The first and second stages will be two smaller Apertura and Clausura tournaments of 17 games each. Each team will play the other teams once during the Apertura tournament and once during the Clausura tournament in reversed order for a total of 34 matches. Points earned during the Apertura will not carry over during the Clausura. The winners of the Apertura and Clausura stages will qualify to the playoffs along with the top two teams of the aggregate table at the end of the season.

The playoffs to decide the national champion will be contested by four teams, which will play two semifinals with the winners playing the final. In every stage of the playoffs, the teams with the most points on the aggregate table will choose which leg they play as the home team. If the teams are tied in points after the two legs of the final, a third match on neutral ground will be played to decide the national champion. If a team wins both the Apertura and Clausura, the playoffs will not be played and that team will be declared as champion.

Qualification to international competitions will be as follows: the top four teams of the aggregate table will qualify for the Copa Libertadores, while the next three best teams in that table will qualify for the Copa Sudamericana. In case the Copa LFP - FPF winners have already qualified for an international competition, the eighth best team in the aggregate table will also qualify for the Copa Sudamericana. The two teams with the fewest points in the aggregate table at the end of the season will be relegated.

A system of promotion and relegation exists between the Primera División and the Segunda División. The two lowest placed teams in Primera División are relegated to the Segunda División, and the top two teams from the Segunda División promoted to the Primera.

Number of clubs in Primera División throughout the years
Period (in years)	No. of clubs
1912–1916	8 clubs
1917	13 clubs
1918–1919	14 clubs
1920	9 clubs
1921–1926	11 clubs
1927	8 clubs
1928	19 clubs
1929	13 clubs
1930–1931	12 clubs
1932	8 clubs
1933–1934	10 clubs
1935	5 clubs
1938–1941	8 clubs
1942	10 clubs

Number of clubs in Primera División throughout the years
Period (in years)	No. of clubs
1943–1949	8 clubs
1950–1965	10 clubs
1966–1970	14 clubs
1971–1972	16 clubs
1973	18 clubs
1974	22 clubs
1975	18 clubs
1976–1983	16 clubs
1984	25 clubs
1985–1987	30 clubs
1988	37 clubs
1989	42 clubs
1990	44 clubs
1991	41 clubs

Number of clubs in Primera División throughout the years
Period (in years)	No. of clubs
1992–1996	16 clubs
1997–2003	12 clubs
2004	14 clubs
2005–2007	12 clubs
2008	14 clubs
2009–2018	16 clubs
2019	18 clubs
2020	20 clubs
2021	18 clubs
2022–2023	19 clubs
2024	18 clubs
2025	19 clubs
2026	18 clubs

=== International ===
Eight teams participate in international competitions while they play the national championship, the Copa Libertadores and the Copa Sudamericana. These international club fixtures take place during the week on Tuesdays, Wednesdays, and Thursdays. Peru is allotted four spots in the Copa Libertadores and four in the Copa Sudamericana. Cienciano of Cusco became the first and only Peruvian club in history to win a continental competition, winning the 2003 Copa Sudamericana and later 2004 Recopa Sudamericana.

=== South American qualification ===
South America has two international competitions played every year. Peru has eight berths in total, four in the Copa Libertadores and four in the Copa Sudamericana. The top two teams directly qualify for the Copa Libertadores Group Stage, with the next two qualifying for the Copa Libertadores second and first stage. The next four teams qualify for the Copa Sudamericana. Three teams from the Liga 1 will qualify for the Copa Sudamericana for 2025 and future seasons, as the national domestic cup, the Copa LFP - FPF, serves as an additional qualifier for the Copa Sudamericana acting as Peru 4. The Copa LFP - FPF is played between the teams of the Liga 1, Liga 2 and Liga 3. Each placement is determined by the yearly aggregate table at the end of each season.

=== Sponsorship ===
The Peruvian First Division is currently sponsored by TeApuesto, with the official sponsorship name being "Liga 1 Te Apuesto". In 2021, the global online casino company Betsson acquired naming rights for Liga 1, extending the sponsorship to 2023, with the league officially taking the name "Liga 1 Betsson" for the 2021 season. The deal was extended after the 2022 season for the 2023 season. TeApuesto returned as sponsor in 2024. The league was sponsored by Movistar TV (formerly known as Cable Mágico and known as "Copa Movistar" until 2018. They have had exclusive broadcasting rights since 2000. Other broadcasting companies include ATV, L1MAX, and GOLPeru. The tournament was named "Torneo Descentralizado" since 1966 but renamed to "Liga 1" in 2019.

2005–2007	2008–2011	2011–2018	2019–present

== Rivalries ==
- Alianza Lima – Universitario de Deportes (National derby)
- Alianza Lima – Sporting Cristal (Modern derby)
- Sporting Cristal – Universitario de Deportes (Modern derby)
- Deportivo Municipal – Universitario de Deportes (Modern derby)
- Cienciano – Melgar (Southern derby)
- Carlos A. Mannucci – Juan Aurich (Northern derby)
- Cienciano – Cusco (Modern Cusco derby)
- Cienciano – Deportivo Garcilaso (Cusco derby)
- Atlético Chalaco – Sport Boys (Callao derby)
- Carlos A. Mannucci – Universidad César Vallejo (Trujillo derby)
- Atlético Grau – Alianza Atlético (Piura derby)

== Clubs ==
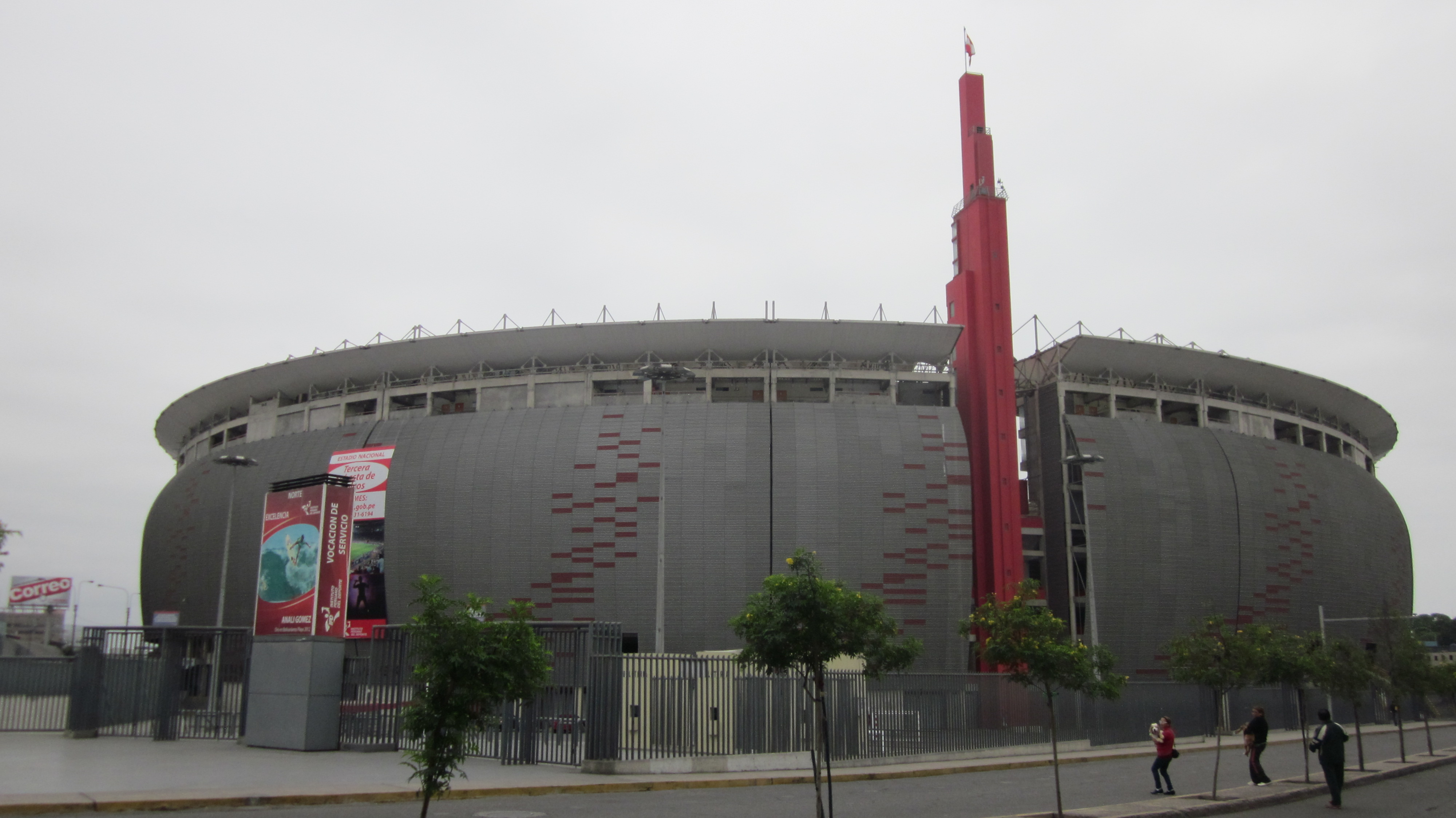
The Estadio Nacional is a historic football stadium in Peru. It has hosted hundreds of matches since its inauguration in 1952. The site of the stadium was originally a stadium that hosted the first matches in La Liga Peruana de fútbol.

Currently, 18 clubs participate in the Liga 1. Of these 18 clubs, only Universitario and Alianza Lima are owners of their home stadiums. The remaining 16 clubs are dependent upon the Instituto Peruano del Deporte for their local matches. Many clubs however, own their proper training grounds. Two clubs operate as Sociedades Anónimas, the equivalent of a public limited company in the United Kingdom; these clubs are Universidad César Vallejo and Sporting Cristal. The remaining 14 clubs operate as civil non-profit associations or asociaciónes civiles sin fines de lucro in Spanish. 4 of these clubs are from the Lima metropolitan area and the remaining clubs make up the 14 teams from the country's interior. Prior to the current 18-club Primera División, 14 teams competed in 2008, 12 between 2006 and 2007, and 16 between 2009 and 2018. In 1989 and 1990, the Primera División played with a record 44 teams.

Universitario and Alianza Lima have a clear advantage of titles won over the other clubs in Peru. Since 1912, they have won a combined total of 54 Primera División championships of the 109 seasons contested, 29 and 25 respectively. Sporting Cristal trails behind with 20 professional era titles since their debut in 1956 and further behind is the traditional Sport Boys having conquered six league titles. Universidad de San Martín de Porres challenged the dominance of the Big Three with back-to-back titles in 2007 and 2008 and a third in 2010. In addition, Binacional, Melgar, Juan Aurich, and Unión Huaral are the only clubs outside the metropolitan area of Lima to have won a national championship. Other noteworthy clubs to have won championships include 4-time winner Deportivo Municipal.

Universitario is the club with the longest spell in the Primera División, playing since 1928 when they debuted as Federación Universitaria and changing their name to Universitario de Deportes a few years later. They are followed by archrivals Alianza Lima who competed in the first edition of the Primera División but were relegated in 1938 and returning a year later for an uninterrupted spell since 1940. Melgar is the team with the longest run in the Primera División outside Lima, competing since 1971.

The oldest club currently participating in the Primera División is Alianza Lima, which was founded at the beginning of the turn of the century in 1901. The newest club active in the Primera División include Cajamarca and Deportivo Moquegua.

Locations of the 2026 Liga 1 teams
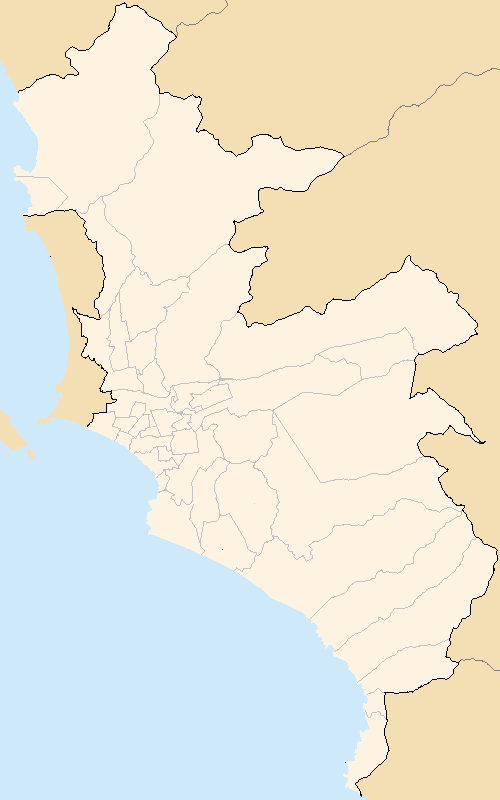
Locations of the 2026 Liga 1 teams – Lima

Team	City	Stadium	Capacity
ADT	Tarma	Unión Tarma	9,100
Alianza Atlético	Sullana	Campeones del 36	12,000
Alianza Lima	Lima	Alejandro Villanueva	35,938
Atlético Grau	Piura	Miguel Grau	22,200
Cajamarca	Cajamarca	Héroes de San Ramón	10,485
Cienciano	Cusco	Garcilaso	45,056
Comerciantes Unidos	Cutervo	Juan Maldonado Gamarra	13,680
Cusco	Cusco	Garcilaso	45,056
Deportivo Garcilaso	Cusco	Garcilaso	45,056
Deportivo Moquegua	Moquegua	25 de Noviembre	21,073
Juan Pablo II College	Chongoyape	Complejo Juan Pablo II	3,000
Los Chankas	Andahuaylas	Los Chankas	10,000
Melgar	Arequipa	Virgen de Chapi	40,370
Sport Boys	Callao	Miguel Grau	17,000
Sport Huancayo	Huancayo	Huancayo	20,000
Sporting Cristal	Lima	Alberto Gallardo	11,600
Universitario de Deportes	Lima	Monumental	80,093
UTC	Cajamarca	Héroes de San Ramón	10,485

== Seasons in Liga 1 ==
There are 30 teams that have appeared in seven seasons of Liga 1 in split Apertura and Clausura tournaments. The teams in bold compete in Peruvian Liga 1 currently. The year in parentheses represents the most recent year of participation at this level. Alianza Lima, Melgar, Sport Boys, Sport Huancayo, Sporting Cristal, Universitario and UTC are the only teams that have played in every season since Liga 1 was established in 2019.

- **8** seasons: **Alianza Lima** (2026), **Melgar** (2026), **Sport Boys** (2026), **Sport Huancayo** (2026), **Sporting Cristal** (2026), **Universitario de Deportes** (2026), **UTC** (2026)
- **7** seasons: **Cienciano** (2026), **Cusco** (2026)
- **6** seasons: **Alianza Atlético** (2026), **Atlético Grau** (2026), Binacional (2025), Carlos A. Mannucci (2024), Universidad César Vallejo (2024)
- **5** seasons: Academia Cantolao (2023), **ADT** (2026), Deportivo Municipal (2023), Ayacucho (2025)
- **4** seasons: Universidad San Martín (2022), Alianza Universidad (2025), **Deportivo Garcilaso** (2026)
- **3** seasons: **Comerciantes Unidos** (2026), **Los Chankas** (2026), Unión Comercio (2024)
- **2** seasons: Carlos Stein (2022), **Juan Pablo II College** (2026)
- **1** season: **Cajamarca** (2026), Deportivo Llacuabamba (2020), **Deportivo Moquegua** (2026), Pirata (2019)

=== Most appearances ===
Below is the list of clubs that have appeared in Liga 1 (formerly Torneo Descentralizado) since its inception in 1966 until the 2025 season. The teams in bold compete in Liga 1 currently. The year in parentheses represents the most recent year of participation at this level. Alianza Lima, Sporting Cristal and Universitario are the only teams that have played in every season of Liga 1.

As of 2026 season

- **61** seasons: **Alianza Lima** (2026), **Sporting Cristal** (2026), **Universitario de Deportes** (2026)
- **57** seasons: **Melgar** (2026)
- **53** seasons: **Sport Boys** (2026)
- **44** seasons: Deportivo Municipal (2023)
- **43** seasons: **Cienciano** (2026)
- **36** seasons: Juan Aurich (2017)
- **33** seasons: **Alianza Atlético** (2026)
- **27** seasons: León de Huánuco (2015)
- **26** seasons: **UTC** (2026)
- **25** seasons: Carlos A. Mannucci (2024)
- **24** seasons: Unión Huaral (2006)
- **23** seasons: Coronel Bolognesi (2009)
- **22** seasons: CNI (2011)
- **21** seasons: **Atlético Grau** (2026)
- **19** seasons: Atlético Torino (1997), Defensor Lima (1994), Universidad San Martín (2022)
- **18** seasons: Alfonso Ugarte (1991), **Sport Huancayo** (2026)
- **17** seasons: **ADT** (2026), Deportivo Junín (1990), Universidad César Vallejo (2024)
- **16** seasons: Unión Minas (2001)
- **15** seasons: Ayacucho (2025)
- **14** seasons: **Cusco** (2026), Octavio Espinosa (1991)
- **13** seasons: Atlético Chalaco (1985)
- **12** seasons: Deportivo Wanka (2004), José Gálvez (2013), San Agustín (1996)
- **11** seasons: Unión Comercio (2024)
- **7** seasons: Academia Cantolao (2023), Binacional (2025), Defensor ANDA (1990), Defensor Arica (1972)
- **6** seasons: Atlético Huracán (1990), **Comerciantes Unidos** (2026), Diablos Rojos (1991), Juventud La Joya (1990), Juventud La Palma (1987)
- **5** seasons: Alianza Universidad (2025), Deportivo Cañaña (1991), Internazionale (1991), José Pardo (1975), Mina San Vicente (1991), Porvenir Miraflores (1971), Sport Áncash (2009)
- **4** seasons: AELU (1991), Centro Iqueño (1969), **Deportivo Garcilaso** (2026), Deportivo Hospital (1991), Deportivo Pucallpa (1988), Estudiantes de Medicina (2004), Libertad (1991)
- **3** seasons: 15 de Septiembre (1990), Alipio Ponce (1990), Atlético Universidad (2005), Aurich–Cañaña (1996), Aurora (1991), Ciclista Lima (1996), Deportivo SIMA (1973), Guardia Republicana (1996), Hungaritos Agustinos (1988), Juvenil Los Ángeles (1991), **Los Chankas** (2026), Mariscal Sucre (1968), Sport Coopsol Trujillo (2002), Total Chalaco (2010), Unión Tarapoto (1991)
- **2** seasons: Alfonso Ugarte de Chiclín (1967), Atlético Belén (1990), Carlos Stein (2022), Chacarita Versalles (1990), Chanchamayo (1985), Cobresol (2012), Deportivo Bancos (1991), Deportivo Morba (1991), Deportivo Pacífico (1991), Deportivo Tintaya (1989), Hijos de Yurimaguas (1992), **Juan Pablo II College** (2026), KDT Nacional (1969), La Loretana (1997), Los Espartanos (1986), Mariscal Nieto (1991), Rosario (2018), San Martín de Porres (1990), Sport Pilsen (1985), Unión Huayllaspanca (1991)
- **1** season: ADO (1971), Alcides Vigo (1997), Alianza Naval (1988), Atlético Minero (2008), Atlético Barrio Frigorífico (1974), **Cajamarca** (2026), Carlos Concha (1966), Defensor La Bocana (2016), Deportivo Comercio (1991), Deportivo Llacuabamba (2020), **Deportivo Moquegua** (2026), IMI (1999), Lawn Tennis (1998), Los Caimanes (2014), Pacífico (2013), Pirata (2019), Piérola (1974), San Simón (2014), Social Magdalena (1989), Sport Loreto (2015), Sportivo Huracán (1973), Unión Pesquero (1974), Walter Ormeño (1974)

== Titles by club ==
- There are 21 clubs who have won the Peruvian title.
- Teams in **bold** compete in the Liga 1 as of the 2026 season.
- Italics indicates clubs that no longer exist or disaffiliated from the FPF.

Rank	Club	Winners	Runners-up	Winning years	Runners-up years
1	**Universitario de Deportes**	29	16	1929, 1934, 1939, 1941, 1945, 1946, 1949, 1959, 1960, 1964, 1966, 1967, 1969, 1971, 1974, 1982, 1985, 1987, 1990, 1992, 1993, 1998, 1999, 2000, 2009, 2013, 2023, 2024, 2025	1928, 1932, 1933, 1940, 1955, 1965, 1970, 1972, 1978, 1984, 1988, 1995, 2002, 2008, 2020
2	**Alianza Lima**	25	25	1918, 1919, 1927, 1928, 1931, 1932, 1933, 1948, 1952, 1954, 1955, 1962, 1963, 1965, 1975, 1977, 1978, 1997, 2001, 2003, 2004, 2006, 2017, 2021, 2022	1914, 1917, 1926, 1930, 1934, 1935, 1937, 1943, 1953, 1956, 1961, 1964, 1971, 1982, 1986, 1987, 1993, 1994, 1996, 1999, 2009, 2011, 2018, 2019, 2023
3	**Sporting Cristal**	20	15	1956, 1961, 1968, 1970, 1972, 1979, 1980, 1983, 1988, 1991, 1994, 1995, 1996, 2002, 2005, 2012, 2014, 2016, 2018, 2020	1962, 1963, 1967, 1973, 1977, 1989, 1992, 1997, 1998, 2000, 2003, 2004, 2015, 2021, 2024
4	**Sport Boys**	6	9	1935, 1937, 1942, 1951, 1958, 1984	1938, 1950, 1952, 1959, 1960, 1966, 1976, 1990, 1991
5	Deportivo Municipal	4	8	1938, 1940, 1943, 1950	1941, 1942, 1944, 1945, 1946, 1947, 1951, 1981
6	Universidad San Martín	3	—	2007, 2008, 2010	—
7	Atlético Chalaco	2	4	1930, 1947	1948, 1957, 1958, 1979
7	**Melgar**	2	3	1981, 2015	1983, 2016, 2022
7	Mariscal Sucre	2	2	1944, 1953	1939, 1949
7	Lima Cricket	2	1	1912, 1914	1913
7	Unión Huaral	2	1	1976, 1989	1974
7	Sport Progreso	2	1	1921, 1926	1920
7	Sport José Gálvez	2	—	1915, 1916	—
14	Juan Aurich	1	2	2011	1968, 2014
14	Jorge Chávez N°1	1	1	1913	1916
14	Binacional	1	—	2019	—
14	Centro Iqueño	1	—	1957	—
14	Defensor Lima	1	—	1973	—
14	San Agustín	1	—	1986	—
14	Sport Juan Bielovucic	1	—	1917	—
14	Sport Inca	1	—	1920	—

== Individual statistics ==
=== Most appearances ===
As of 8 December 2024

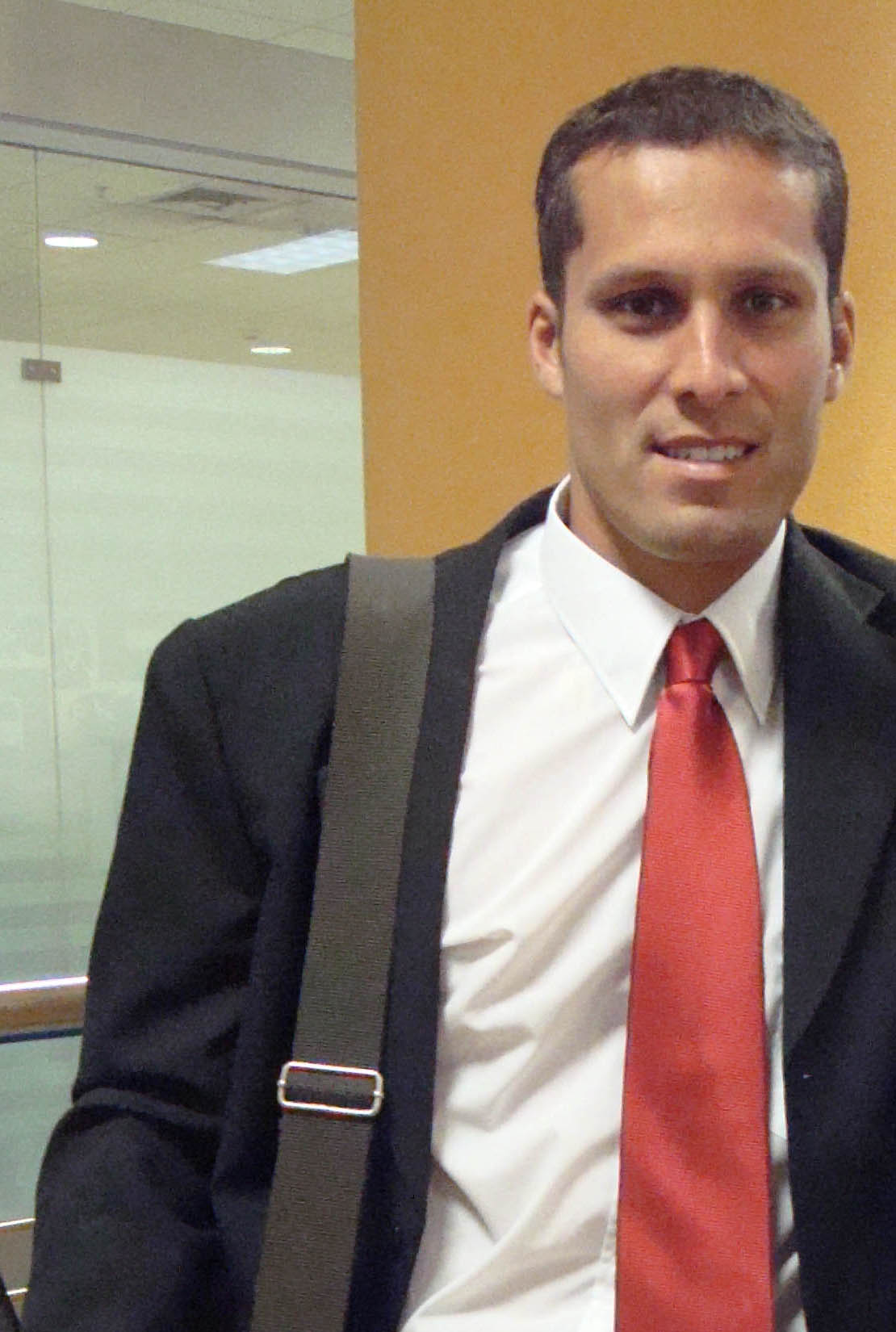
Leao Butrón, most capped player of the Primera División

It's the top ranking the footballers than more have played in the Primera División of the Peruvian football.

- Players in **bold** are still in activity.

Rank	Player	Position	Apps	Years
1	(Peru) Leao Butrón	GK	641	1995-2020
2	(Argentina) Sergio Ibarra	FW	640	1992-2014
3	(Peru) Carlos Lobatón	MF	634	2000-2019
4	(Peru) Diego Penny	GK	611	2004-2024
5	(Peru) José Luis Carranza	MF	570	1985-2004
6	(Peru) Erick Delgado	GK	569	2002-2020
7	(Peru) Mauricio Montes	FW	551	2002-2022
8	(Peru) Jorge Soto	DF	549	1990-2008
9	(Peru) José Soto	DF	523	1987-2006
10	(Peru) José Carvallo	GK	518	2003-2025

=== Top scorers ===
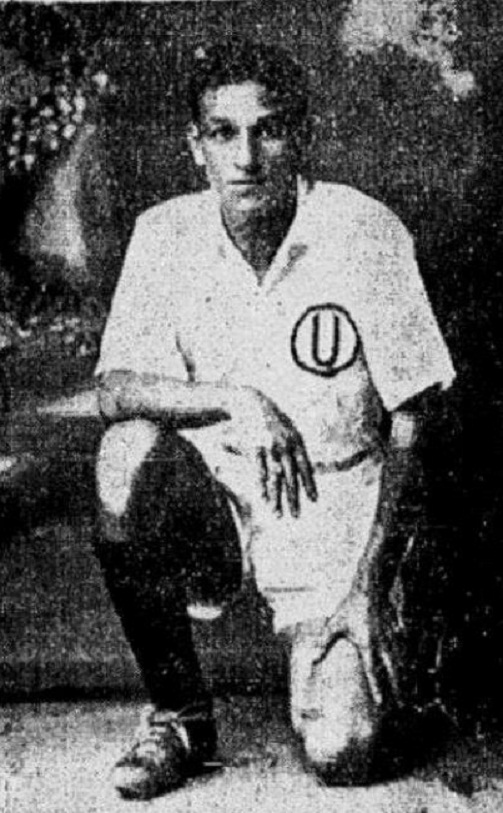
Teodoro Fernández, seven-time Peruvian Primera División top goalscorer

As of 17 November 2026

Rank	Name	Years	Goals
1	(Argentina) Sergio Ibarra	1993–2014	274
2	(Peru) Oswaldo Ramírez	1966–1982	190
3	(Argentina) Bernardo Cuesta	2012–	186
4	(Peru) Irven Ávila	2008–	181
5	(Peru) Waldir Sáenz	1991–2009	171
6	(Peru) Hernán Rengifo	2002–	167
7	(Peru) Germán Carty	1998–2013	163
8	(Peru) Jorge Soto	1990–2008	162
9	(Peru) Teodoro Fernández	1930–1953	161
10	(Peru) Pedro García	1993–2013	157

Most time goalscorers

- 7 times.
  - Teodoro Fernández (1932, 1933, 1934, 1939, 1940, 1942 and 1945)

Most goals by a player in a single season

- 40 goals.
  - (Argentina) Emanuel Herrera (2018)

=== Most assists ===
Rank	Country	Player	Assists
1	(Argentina)	Alfredo Ramúa	109
2	(Peru)	Irven Ávila	95
3	(Peru)	Teófilo Cubillas	81
4	(Peru)	Alejandro Hohberg	53
5	(Uruguay)	Horacio Calcaterra	52
6	(Peru)	Carlos Lobatón	52
7	(Argentina)	Bernardo Cuesta	50
8	(Uruguay)	Pablo Lavandeira	48
9	(Peru)	Genaro Neyra	43
10	(Peru)	Jhonny Vidales	38

Most assists by a player in a single season

- 21 assists.
  - (Argentina) Santiago González (2024)

=== Most clean sheets ===
Rank	Country	Goalkeeper	Clean sheets
1	(Peru)	Leao Butrón	195
2	(Peru)	Erick Delgado	176
3	(Peru)	Diego Penny	173
4	(Peru)	José Carvallo	168
5	(Argentina)	Óscar Ibáñez	159
6	(Peru)	Joel Pinto	131
7	(Peru)	Salomon Libman	119

=== Multiple hat-tricks ===
Rank	Country	Player	Hat-tricks
1	(Peru)	Miguel Mostto	6
1	(Uruguay)	Martín Cauteruccio	6
3	(Argentina)	**Bernardo Cuesta**	5
4	(Colombia)	Robinson Aponzá	3
4	(Argentina)	Emanuel Herrera	3
6	(Peru)	**Irven Ávila**	2
6	(Peru)	Raúl Ruidíaz	2
6	(Panama)	Luis Tejada	2
6	(Peru)	**Alex Valera**	2
6	(Peru)	Ysrael Zúñiga	2
11	(Peru)	Wilmer Aguirre	1
11	(Argentina)	Sergio Almirón	1
11	(Peru)	Pedro Ascoy	1
11	(Argentina)	**Neri Bandiera**	1
11	(Argentina)	Danilo Carando	1
11	(Peru)	Victor Espinoza	1
11	(Peru)	Teodoro Fernández	1
11	(Ecuador)	**Carlos Garcés**	1
11	(Argentina)	Santiago Giordana	1
11	(Uruguay)	Diego Guastavino	1
11	(Colombia)	Víctor Guazá	1
11	(Peru)	**Jordan Guivin**	1
11	(Uruguay)	Sebastián Gularte	1
11	(Peru)	**Alejandro Hohberg**	1
11	(Peru)	Valeriano López	1
11	(Peru)	Antonio Meza	1
11	(Paraguay)	Carlos Neumann	1
11	(Paraguay)	**Roberto Ovelar**	1
11	(Argentina)	Germán Pacheco	1
11	(Colombia)	Lionard Pajoy	1
11	(Uruguay)	Facundo Peraza	1
11	(Peru)	**Kevin Quevedo**	1
11	(Uruguay)	Cristian Palacios	1
11	(Peru)	**José Rivera**	1
11	(Peru)	**Víctor Rossel**	1
11	(Uruguay)	Santigo Silva	1
11	(Peru)	**Matías Succar**	1
11	(Uruguay)	**Cristian Techera**	1
11	(Peru)	Javier Trauco	1
11	(Peru)	Héctor Zeta	1

Most hat-tricks by a player in a single season

- 6 hat-tricks.
  - (Uruguay) Martín Cauteruccio (2024)

== See also ==
- Football in Peru
- Peruvian Football Federation
- List of football clubs in Peru
- Copa de la Liga
- Supercopa Peruana
- Torneo de Promoción y Reserva
- Peruvian football league system
  - Liga 2
  - Liga 3
  - Copa Perú
  - Ligas Departamentales
  - Ligas Superiores
  - Ligas Provinciales
  - Ligas Distritales

== Footnotes ==
A. Includes titles as "Federación Universitaria" (until 1932).
B. Includes titles as "Sport Alianza" (Liga).
C. Liga team from Lima, not to be confused with José Gálvez from Chimbote.
