= Lima Cricket and Football Club =

Multi-sports club in Peru

Lima Cricket & Football Club
- Full name: Lima Cricket & Football Club
- Founded: 1859; 167 years ago
- Ground: Lima, Peru
- Chairman: Gustavo Zevallos Velarde
- League: Copa Perú
- Website: https://www.clublimacricket.com/
Home colours	Away colours

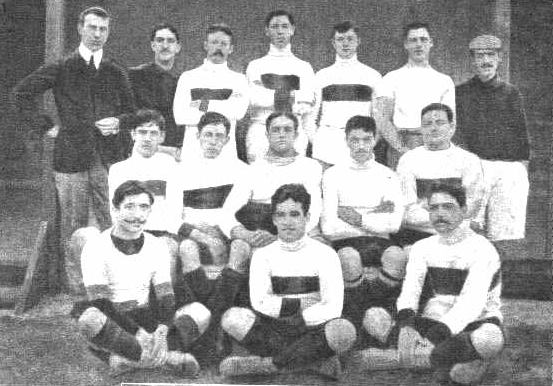
The 1912 football team, Primera División champion

Lima Cricket & Football Club is a Peruvian professional sports club based in the country's capital city of Lima. Lima Cricket claims to be both the oldest cricket club in South America, and the oldest association football-practising club in Peru and the Americas, having been founded in 1859 by the city's British community. The football team currently participates in the local league of San Isidro District, Lima.

The club is the de facto home of the Peru Cricket Association, and hosts the National T20 Cricket League during the summer months of January to April. It has also hosted a number of international tournaments, featuring the Peru national cricket team. The most recent was the South American Championship in April 2014, with competing teams from Argentina (men & women), Brazil (men & women), Chile and Mexico (men only).

Apart from football and cricket, nowadays the club hosts the practise of basketball, basque pelota, fencing, field hockey, squash, table tennis, tennis, swimming, volleyball, and water aerobics (rugby union is no longer practised). Other social activities include bocce, darts, pilates, snooker, and zumba.

== History ==
The club was founded by English immigrants as the "Lima Cricket Club". From its start, the club hosted the practise of several sports such as cricket, rugby union, and football and tennis.

Over time, other sports gained popularity within the club, and thus its name changed several times, such as in 1865 to "Lima Cricket and Lawn Tennis Club" (when it merged with a local tennis club) and to "Lima Cricket and Football Club" in 1906 (although another source dates this as 1900).

Despite its members having played football since its origins, the first recorded football match was on August 7, 1892. Following on this event, the club now officially added a football-departement in 1893. It took on the current name on April 30, 1906. Lima Cricket went on to inspire future football clubs in Peru, such as Union Cricket.

As Lima C&FC was part of an elite football clubs composed entirely of high-society families, unlike other raising clubs that accepted members and players from popular sectors of Lima. This was notable since the beginning of the 1920s. As a result, Limas CFC would be relegated from the top ranks at the hands of clubs that recruited their players from a much larger pool.

== Rivalries ==
His first rivalry was with the Ciclista Lima who dispute the (Classic of Yesteryear).

== Honours ==
=== Senior titles ===
Keys

- Record
- ^{(s)} Shared record

Type	Competition	Titles	Runn.	Winning years	Runner-up years
National	Primera División	2	1	1912, 1914	1913
Regional	Liga Distrital de San Isidro	4	3	2007, 2008, 2012, 2016	2009, 2010, 2011

== See also ==
- List of football clubs in Peru
- Peruvian football league system
- Genoa Cricket and Football Club

== Bibliography ==
- Higgins, James (2005). Lima: A Cultural and Literary History. Oxford: Signal Books Limited. ISBN 1-902669-98-3.
