= Sportivo Jorge Chávez (Callao) =

Peruvian football club

Jorge Chávez
- Full name: Club Sportivo Jorge Chávez
- Founded: July 7, 1913
- Dissolved: 1969; 57 years ago
- Ground: Telmo Carbajo; Callao, Peru
Home colours	Away colours

Club Sportivo Jorge Chávez was a Peruvian football club, located in the city of Callao. The club was founded with the name of club Jorge Chávez in honor of the Peruvian aviator Jorge Chávez and played in Peruvian Primera Division from 1915 until 1921, and later in 1929, 1948 and 1950 it was their last appearance.

== History ==
The club was founded on July 7, 1913, on Cuzco Street in Callao, taking its name in honor of the Peruvian aviator Jorge Chávez. Its founders were Pedro Valega, Enrique Álvarez, Fermín Flores, and Frank Runciman, all students of Callao High School (now Colegio América). It was initially known as Jorge Chávez No. 2 (the second club from Callao with that name) to distinguish it from the Lima-based side Jorge Chávez No. 1, founded years earlier. It later adopted its full name.

The club competed in the First Division in 1928 and 1929, being relegated in the latter after finishing second from bottom. In the following years, it played in the División Intermedia, then in the Liga Provincial del Callao, and later in the Liga Regional de Lima y Callao.

It won the Regional League title in 1943, earning promotion to the 1944 Peruvian Segunda División. In 1947, it secured the Second Division championship after a 4–2 victory over Telmo Carbajo on the penultimate matchday, achieving promotion back to the 1948 Peruvian Primera División.

In the 1948 First Division, it finished bottom and was relegated alongside Ciclista Lima. The following year, it won the Second Division again after defeating Santiago Barranco 2–0 on the penultimate matchday, earning, along with Ciclista, a swift return to the top flight. However, it once again finished bottom in the 1950 Championship and was relegated again.

In the 1955 Peruvian Segunda División, it finished last and suffered relegation. The club then played in the Liga Provincial del Callao until 1969, when it disappeared.

== Statistics and results in First Division ==
=== League history ===
Season	Div.	Pos.	Pl.	W	D	L	GF	GA	P	Notes
1929	1st	11	11	2	3	6	14	16	7	11/12 Regular Season
1948	1st	9	24	5	4	15	35	62	14	9/9 Regular Season
1950	1st	10	18	4	0	14	21	49	8	10/10 Regular Season

== Honours ==
=== Senior titles ===
Keys

- Record
- ^{(s)} Shared record

Type	Competition	Titles	Runner-up	Winning years	Runner-up years
National (League)	Primera División	—	2	—	1918, 1921
National (League)	Segunda División	2	—	1947, 1949	—
Regional (League)	Primera División Regional de Lima y Callao	1	—	1943	—
Regional (League)	Primera División Amateur del Callao	—	2	—	1933, 1938
Regional (League)	División Intermedia (Callao)	—	1	—	1932

== See also ==
- List of football clubs in Peru
- Peruvian football league system
