= Jorge Chávez No. 1 =

Peruvian football club

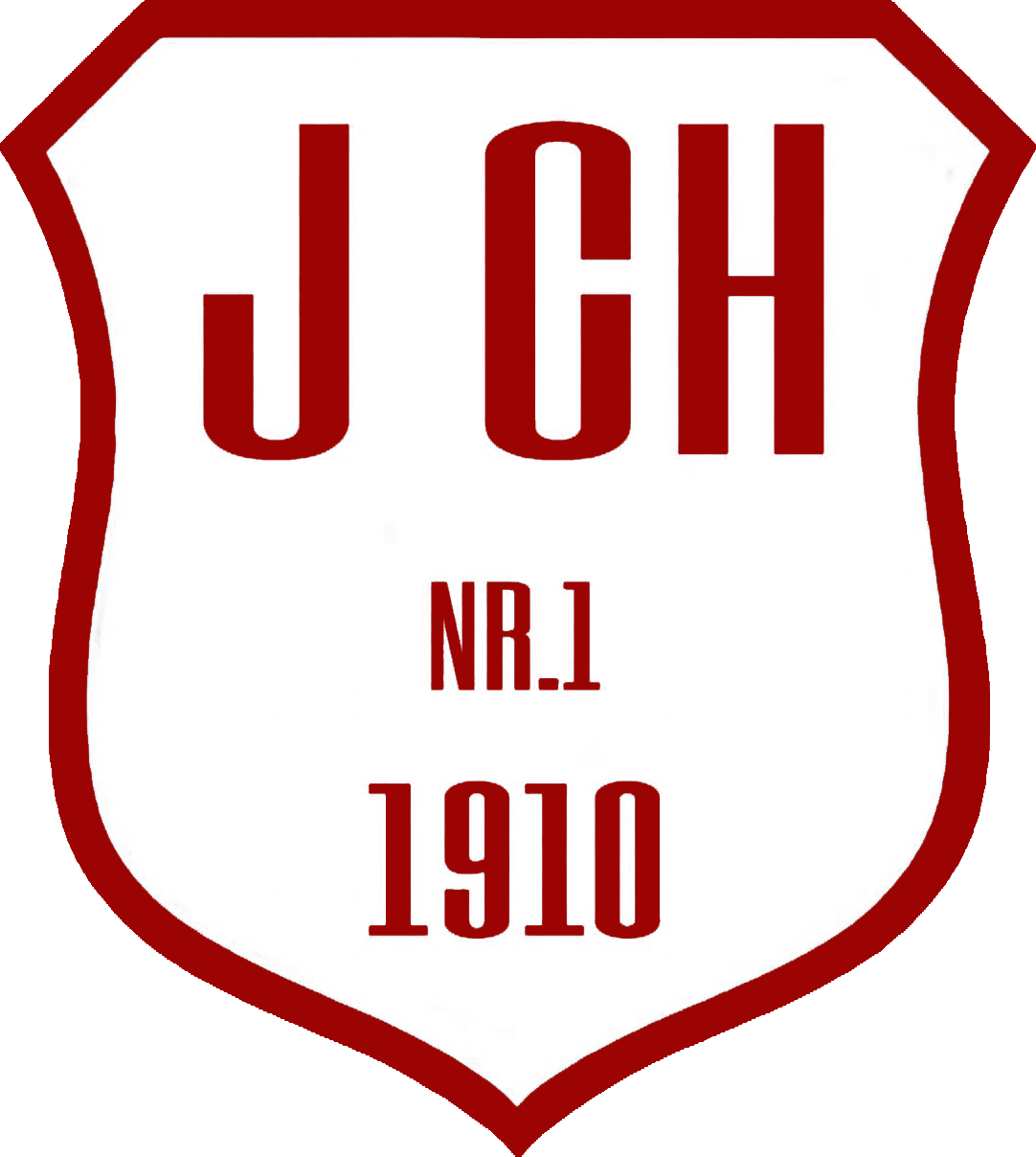
- Full name: Club Deportivo Jorge Chávez No. 1
- Founded: 1910
- Dissolved: 1992; 34 years ago
- Ground: Estadio Nacional; Lima, Peru
- Capacity: 45,000
Home colours	Away colours	Third colours

Jorge Chávez No. 1 was a Peruvian football club, located in the city of Lima. The club was founded with the name of club Jorge Chávez Nr. 1 in honor of the Peruvian aviator Jorge Chávez and played in Primera Division Peruana from 1912 until 1929. The club won the national tournament in 1913.

== History ==
C.D. Jorge Chávez was a Peruvian football club based in the city of Lima. The club was founded in 1910 under the name Jorge Chávez No. 1, in honor of Peruvian aviator Jorge Chávez. It was one of the early Lima-based clubs involved in the founding of the Liga Peruana de Football. Federico Flores Escalante served as the club’s delegate and representative and was also elected as the first Vice President of the Professional Football Sports Association.

Jorge Chávez No. 1 joined the First Division in 1912. The following year, the club won the Peruvian Football League title. In the 1914 season, Club Deportivo Jorge Chávez finished in third place. The following year, the club was relegated and dropped to the División Intermedia. However, Jorge Chávez No. 1 secured promotion back to the First Division for the 1916 season.

In 1916, Jorge Chávez No. 1 finished as league runners-up after losing to Sport José Gálvez in the championship playoff. That same year, the club defeated its counterpart from Callao, Sportivo Jorge Chávez, giving rise to a derby that lasted for five years.

In 1919, the club contested the Copa de Campeones del Perú against Sport Alianza, but was defeated and finished as runners-up. C.D. Jorge Chávez continued to compete in the Peruvian league system until 1921. When the league resumed in 1926, the club failed to appear and consequently lost its top-flight status. Shortly thereafter, the club did not take part in subsequent championships and eventually ceased operations.

== Honours ==
=== Senior titles ===
Keys

- Record
- ^{(s)} Shared record

Type	Competition	Titles	Runner-up	Winning years	Runner-up years
National (League)	Primera División	1	1	1913	1916
National (Cups)	Copa de Campeones del Perú	—	1	—	1919

== See also ==
- List of football clubs in Peru
- Peruvian football league system
