= Atlético Peruano =

- Full name: Atlético Peruano
- Founded: August 29, 1910; 115 years ago
- Ground: Estadio Nacional; Lima, Peru
- Capacity: 45,000
Home colours	Away colours	Third colours

Atlético Peruano was a Peruvian football club, located in the district of Rímac, Lima. The club was founded with the name of club Atlético Peruano Nr. 1 and played in the third edition of the Liga Peruana de Football in 1914.

== History ==
Club Atlético Peruano was founded by Guillermo Porras Villagomes. The club made its debut in Peruvian football in the 1912 Segunda División, within the newly established Liga Peruana de Football. It earned promotion to the First Division the following year and competed continuously in the top flight from 1914 to 1919.

The numbering in its name followed a common practice of the time, used to distinguish it from its Callao-based counterpart, Atlético Peruano No. 2. Club Atlético Peruano is regarded as one of the oldest clubs in the country, alongside traditional sides such as Alianza Lima, Fraternal Barranco, Alianza Chorrillos, Lima Cricket, and Ciclista Lima.

The club competed for several seasons in the Liga Provincial de Lima, from 1951 until the early 1970s, achieving its best campaign in 1956 when it finished as runner-up.

The club earned promotion to the Liga Mayor de Fútbol de Lima in 1980, featuring a notable squad that included Ricardo Francia (captain), David Unyen (goalkeeper), José Velásquez Sánchez (midfielder), Alberto Noé (center-back), and José Noé (forward and the team’s top scorer), among others.

In 1982, it reached the final hexagonal stage of the Interligas de Lima, marking one of its strongest campaigns at the metropolitan level.

The club later competed in the División Intermedia in 1985 and took part in the Segunda División in 1986, where it was relegated in the same season.

== Honours ==
Keys

- Record
- ^{(s)} Shared record

Type	Competition	Titles	Runner-up	Winning years	Runner-up years
National (League)	Primera División	—	1	—	1915
National (League)	Segunda División (1912–1925)	1	1	1922	1913
Regional (League)	Primera División Amateur de Lima	—	1	—	1956
Regional (League)	División Intermedia	—	1	—	1936
Regional (League)	Segunda División Amateur de Lima	2	1	1933 Zona Rímac, 1951 Serie A	1932 Zona Rímac

== See also ==
- List of football clubs in Peru
- Peruvian football league system
