= Unión Miraflores =

Peruvian football club

- Full name: Centro Sport Unión Miraflores
- Founded: 1911
- Chairman: A. Salazar
Home colours	Away colours	Third colours

Unión Miraflores was a Peruvian football club, located in the district of Miraflores, Lima.

== History ==
The club was founded in 1911 under the name Club Centro Sport Unión Miraflores and competed in the Liga Peruana de Football from 1912 to 1921. Its delegate and representative during the formation of the Liga Peruana de Football in 1912 was Mr. A. Salazar.

In 1912, the club was among the inaugural participants of the Second Division and earned promotion to the top tier for the 1913 season. However, in 1913, Unión Miraflores finished bottom of the table and was relegated. In 1914, the club once again ranked among the top teams in the Second Division, securing promotion for the 1915 and 1916 seasons, where it achieved a fourth-place finish.

In 1917, Centro Sport Unión Miraflores reached third place in the Liga Peruana de Football, marking one of its greatest achievements. The club did not participate in the 1918 season, which resulted in its loss of top-flight status. From 1919 until the dissolution of the league in 1921, it competed in the Second Division.

When organized football competitions in Peru resumed after 1925, Centro Sport Unión Miraflores did not return to the national league system. Instead, it went back to its original local competition, then known as the Segunda División Provincial de Lima (equivalent to the third tier). The club competed there for a few years before eventually disappearing.

== See also ==
- List of football clubs in Peru
- Peruvian football league system
