= Sport Juan Bielovucic =

Peruvian football club

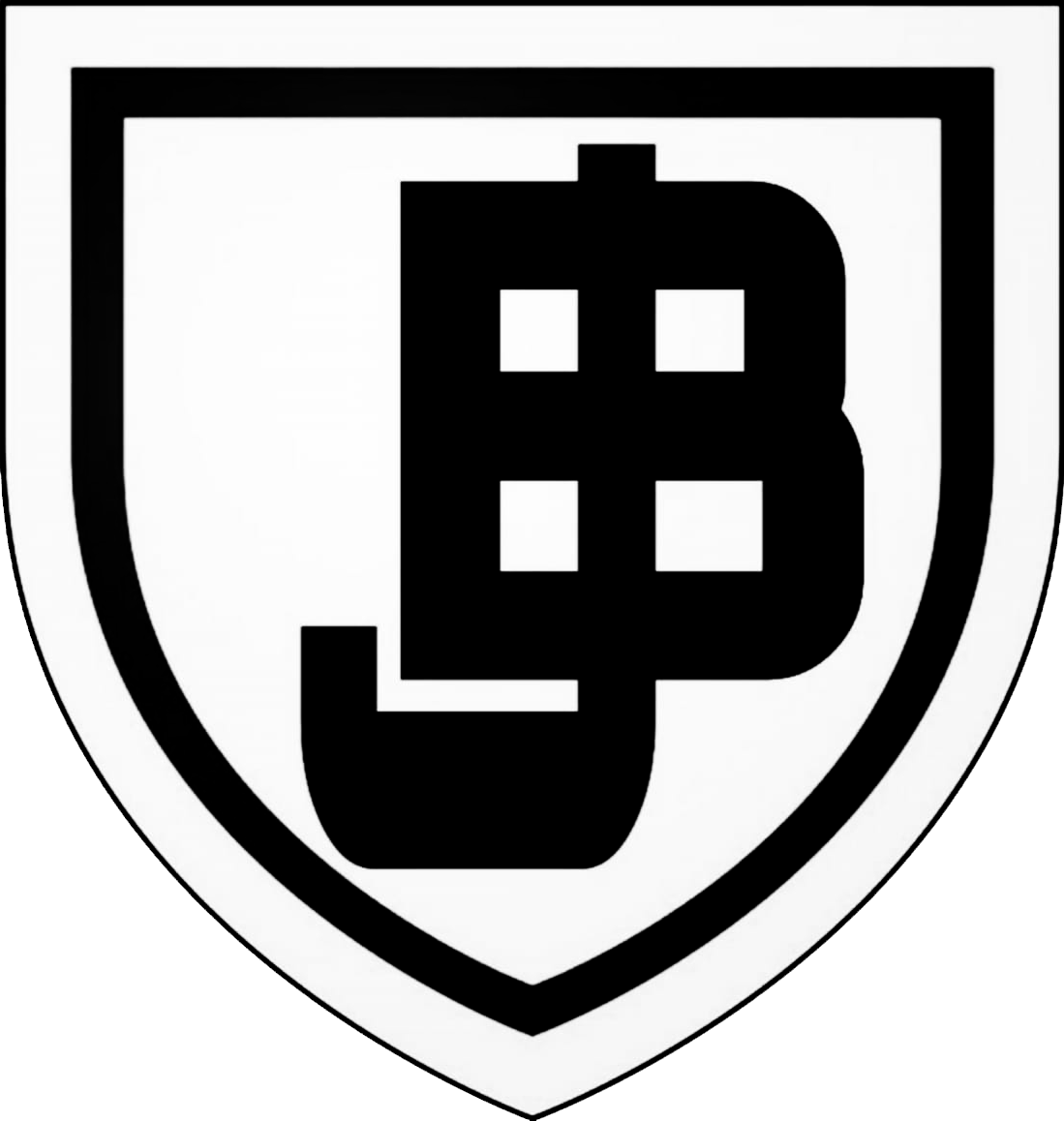
- Full name: Sport Juan Bielovucic
- Ground: Estadio Nacional; Lima, Peru
- Capacity: 45,000
Home colours	Away colours

Sport Juan Bielovucic was a Peruvian football club, located in the city of Lima. The club was founded with the name of club Sport Juan Bielovucic in honor of the Peruvian aviator Juan Bielovucic and played in Peruvian Primera Division from 1912 until 1921. The club won the national tournament in 1917.

== Honours ==
=== Senior titles ===
Keys

- Record
- ^{(s)} Shared record

Type	Competition	Titles	Runner-up	Winning years	Runner-up years
National (League)	Primera División	1	—	1917	—
National (League)	Segunda División (1912–1925)	1	1	1915	1922
