= Sport José Gálvez =

Peruvian football club

Sport José Galvez
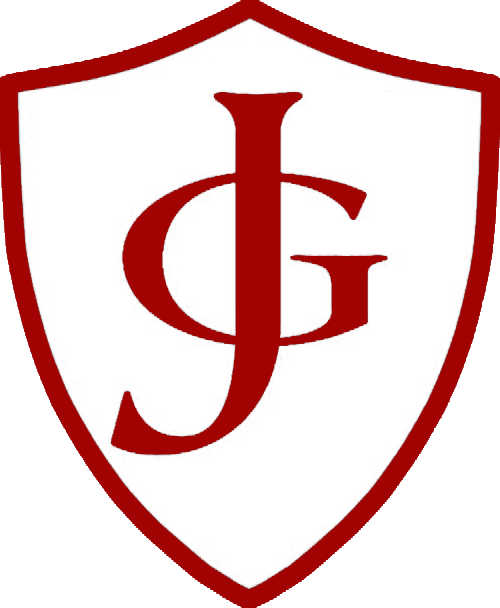
- Full name: Club Sport Social José Galvez
- Nicknames: El milrayitas victoriano El Decano del distrito de La Victoria
- Founded: May 2, 1907; 118 years ago
- Ground: Estadio Nacional; Lima, Peru
- Capacity: 45,000
- Chairman: Flavio Gibolini
Home colours	Away colours	Third colours

Club Sport Social José Galvez was a Peruvian football club, located in the city of Lima. The club was founded with the name of club Sport José Galvez and played in Peruvian Primera División from 1915 until 1926. The club won the national tournament in 1915 and 1916. In 1926, Sport José Galvez was relegated and it was their last appearance in the Peruvian Primera División.

== History ==
Club Sport Social José Gálvez was founded on May 2, 1907, by workers of the “La Victoria” textile factory. Its first president was Pedro Rivas.

In 1912, the club took part in the foundation of the Liga Peruana de Football; however, it withdrew before the start of the competition and did not participate in the inaugural season. Two years later, it rejoined and earned promotion in 1914. The club went on to win the Dewar Cup—awarded to the league champion—in both 1915 and 1916. In the 1915 campaign, José Gálvez defeated Atlético Peruano 4–1 to secure its first league title. In the 1916 season, during the final stretch, it faced Jorge Chávez No. 1 in a decisive clash between title contenders, winning 1–0 and claiming back-to-back championships.

In the following years, the club remained a regular participant and contender in various competitions. It also took part in the first edition of the championships organized by the Peruvian Football Federation in 1926, where it finished bottom of the table and was relegated, never returning to the top division thereafter.

In 1958, the club was crowned unbeaten champions of the Tercera División Provincial de Lima, enjoying an outstanding campaign with eight wins and one draw, scoring 15 goals and conceding just one. During that season, the club was presided over by David Nieto, with Lucio and Carlos Collazos, Jorge Rentería, and Miguel Pachas serving as board delegates.

The club was later crowned champions of Serie A of the Segunda División Provincial de Lima, finishing ahead of Audax FBC, which earned them promotion to the Liga Provincial de Lima, where they remained until the 1970s.

== Statistics and results in First Division ==
=== League history ===
Season	Div.	Pos.	Pl.	W	D	L	P	Notes
1926	1st	11	10	1	1	8	3	11/11 Regular Season

== Honours ==
=== Senior titles ===
Keys

- Record
- ^{(s)} Shared record

Type	Competition	Titles	Runner-up	Winning years	Runner-up years
National (League)	Primera División	2	—	1915, 1916	—
National (League)	Segunda División (1912–1925)	2	—	1914	
Regional (League)	Segunda División Amateur de Lima	3	—	1935 Zona Este, 1938 Zona Este, 1959 Serie A	—
Regional (League)	Tercera División Amateur de Lima	1	—	1958	—

== See also ==
- List of football clubs in Peru
- Peruvian football league system
