= Sport Inca =

Peruvian football club

- Full name: Centro Sport Inca
- Founded: May 18, 1908
- Dissolved: 1992; 34 years ago
- Ground: Estadio Nacional; Lima, Peru
- Capacity: 45,000
Home colours	Away colours

Sport Inca was a Peruvian football club, located in the city of Lima. The club was founded with the name of club Sport Inca and played in Primera Division Peruana from 1912 until 1921. The club won the national tournament in 1920.

== History ==
The club was founded in the Rímac District by workers from the Inca Cotton Mill textile factory in the Malambo neighborhood. It was the first club established in the bajopontino districts and one of the founding members of the Peruvian Football League. It competed in the Peruvian First Division from 1912 to 1921, winning the league championship in 1920. In the years that followed, it took part in the promotion divisions. It was one of the few Lima-based teams to defeat Sport Alianza during the latter’s peak years.

In 1970, the club won the Liga de Lima and qualified for the promotion round-robin to the Second Division alongside Santiago Barranco, Defensor San Borja and Atlético Chalaco, with the latter emerging as champions and securing promotion. The club ceased to exist in 1992 after failing to take part in that year’s Second Division tournament of the Liga Distrital del Rímac.

== Honours ==
=== Senior titles ===
Keys

- Record
- ^{(s)} Shared record

Type	Competition	Titles	Runner-up	Winning years	Runner-up years
National (League)	Primera División	1	—	1920	—
Regional (League)	Primera División Amateur de Lima	1	1	1970	1961
Regional (League)	Liga Distrital de Rímac	1	—	1987	—
Regional (League)	Tercera División Amateur de Lima	1	—	1965	—

== See also ==
- List of football clubs in Peru
- Peruvian football league system
