= Peruvian Segunda División (1912–1925) =

Segunda División / Intermedia
- Founded: 1912
- Folded: 1925
- Country: Peru
- Confederation: CONMEBOL
- Level on pyramid: 2 (1912–1925)
- Promotion to: Primera División
- Relegation to: Tercera División

The Segunda División (usually called simply Intermedia) was the second division of Peruvian football (soccer) in 1912 until 1925. The tournament was played on a home-and-away round-robin basis.

In 1912 was the first season of top-flight Peruvian football. A total of 16 teams competed in the league. This first season with organised league, covering Lima, Callao, and suburbs such as Miraflores and Barranco. José Gálvez de Lima withdrew because of not agreeing with the competition format. The clubs from Callao (among which Atlético Chalaco) did not respond to the invitation to enter. The 16 teams were divided over a First División and a Second Division, both of 8 clubs. Atlético Grau No. 1 and Atlético Peruano finished equal on points; however, Atletico Grau No. 1 defeated Atlético Peruano in an extra match and was declared the champion of the Segunda División.

On 23 August 1922, the Peruvian Football Federation (FPF) was founded and since 1926 tournaments began to be played under its organization. As the second category in the tournament system, the División Intermedia was found, which granted promotions to the champion ( and sometimes to the runner-up) to the Peruvian Primera División. Only the 1928 and 1931 editions did not give direct promotion but rather the classification to a promotion league.

== Division levels ==
Year	Level	Promotion to
1912–1921	2	Primera División
1922–1925	2	(None) (Note: No first division or level existing then.)

== Champions ==
Ed.	Season	Champion	Runner-up
1	1912	Atlético Grau N°1	Unión Miraflores
2	1913	Sporting Fry	Atlético Peruano
3	1914	Sport José Gálvez	Unión Miraflores
4	1915	Sport Juan Bielovucic	Unión Miraflores N°2
5	1916	Alianza Chorrillos	Unión Perú
6	1917	Sportivo Lima	Association Alianza
7	1918	Sáenz Peña	Sport Huáscar
8	1919	Teniente Ruiz	Association FBC
9	1920	Unión Barranco	Unión Miraflores
10	1921	No Promotions due to scheduling and organizing conflict	
11	1922	Atlético Peruano	Sport Juan Bielovucic
12	1923	Association FBC	Sporting Fry
13	1924	Sportivo Lima	Association Alianza
14	1925	Teniente Ruiz	Deportivo Nacional
Defunct Tournament (See: División Intermedia)
