= Professional Football Sports Association =

Peruvian football governing body

CONMEBOL
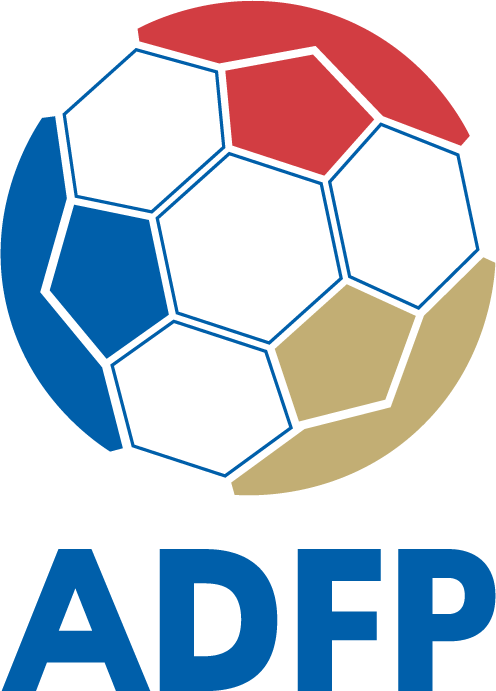
- Founded: 12 May 1912; 113 years ago
- Headquarters: Lima, Peru
- President: Oscar Romero
- Website: www.adfp.org.pe

The Asociación Deportiva de Fútbol Profesional (English: Professional Football Sports Association), commonly known as the ADFP, is a Peruvian football governing body that organizes the Primera División. The association is made up of 9 current clubs.

The first governing body to congregate football clubs in Peru was the Liga Peruana de Football (Peruvian Football League) which was founded on 12 May 1912, commonly known as the LPFB. The league organized its first season in 1912 with 16 clubs from Lima and Callao divided into two divisions but was discontinued after the end of the 1921 season.

The first division was subsequently organized by the Peruvian Football Federation in 1926 which was founded in 1922 and became a member of CONMEBOL in 1925. Starting in 1941, the organization of the Primera División was passed from the Peruvian Football Federation to the newly formed Asociación No Amateur (Non-Amateur Association). This organization was replaced by the Asociación Central de Fútbol (Central Football Association) in 1951 when the Primera División became a professional league. Finally, in 1962, the ADFP succeeded the Asociación Central de Fútbol as the organizing body of the first division.

== List of presidents ==
Period	Name
Liga Peruana de Football
1912	Harry Redshaw
1920	Juan Vicente Nicolini
1921	P. Johnson
Asociación No Amateur (ANA)
1940	
1950	
Asociación Central de Fútbol (ACF)
1954	Ricardo Valdivia
1955	Plácido Galindo
Asociación Peruana de Fútbol (APF)
1962–1964	Plácido Galindo
1964–1965	Alfonso Reverditto
1965–1966	Miguel Monteverde
1967	Germán Podestá
1968–1970	Augusto Moral
Asociación Nacional de Fútbol Profesional (ANFP)
1970–1975	Augusto Moral
1976	José Marcelo Aleman
Asociación Deportiva de Fútbol Profesional (ADFP)
1977–1979	Rafael Eguren
1980	Fausto Alvarado
1981	Mario Sifuentes
1982–1989	Augusto Moral
1990–1991	Carlos Santander
1992–1996	José Marcelo Aleman
1997–2001	Humberto Ugarte
2002–2007	Julio Velásquez Giacarini
2007–2009	Rafael Rizo Patrón
2011–2014	Luis de Souza Ferreira Salinas
2014–2016	Julio Pastor
2016–2017	Arturo Vásquez
2019–2021	Hugo Duthurburu
2021–	Óscar Romero

== See also ==
- List of Peruvian football champions
