= List of Peruvian football champions =

The Peruvian football champions are the winners of the highest league in Peruvian football, which is currently named as Liga 1 and organized by Peruvian Football Federation. The Liga Peruana de Football was established in 1912. It was an amateur league that lasted until 1921 due to scheduling and organizing conflicts. In this league only teams from Lima participated. In 1926, the Peruvian Football Federation took control of organizing the tournament and continued the Peruvian Primera División with the introduction of teams from Callao. In 1951, the Primera División turned professional and in 1966, the Torneo Descentralizado was founded in which the first non-capital teams were invited to play the first national championship. Between 1996 and 2008, the Apertura and Clausura format was adopted.

In its early stages the first division was dominated by Universitario and Alianza Lima. Other notable teams were Atlético Chalaco, Sport Boys and Deportivo Municipal. The professional era saw Sporting Cristal rise to challenge the dominance of Universitario and Alianza Lima. These three teams account for nearly a third of the titles won. Melgar, Juan Aurich and Binacional are the only teams outside the Lima Region to have won national titles. As of 2025, the league title has been won by over 21 clubs but Universitario, Alianza Lima, and Sporting Cristal share a total of 74 titles of the 109 titles contested. Universitario and Alianza Lima alone account for 54 of the titles contested.

== List of champions ==
Peruvian football had amateur status since its foundation until 1950. In the course of this era, Alianza Lima, Atlético Chalaco, Municipal, Sport Boys, and Universitario de Deportes shared the most titles. The first run from 1912 to 1921 featured clubs only from Lima and Callao under the Liga Peruana de Football and were awarded the Escudo Dewar (Dewar Shield, after a trophy gifted to the League by the British Embassy). In 1926, the Peruvian Football Federation organized its first championship and included teams from the Callao league. In 1936 no tournament took place due the 1936 Olympic games. In 1951 the league obtained professional status and in 1966 expanded the league to the entire nation, beginning the Descentralizado.

- (In bracket, title count):

Ed.	Season	Champion	Runner-up	Third place	Winning manager	Leading goalscorer(s)
Liga Peruana de Football (Escudo Dewar)
1	1912	Lima Cricket (1)	Association FBC	Jorge Chávez N°1	—^{[G]}	
2	1913	Jorge Chávez N°1 (1)	Lima Cricket	Sport Alianza	—^{[G]}	
3	1914	Lima Cricket (2)	Sport Alianza	Jorge Chávez N°1	—^{[G]}	
4	1915	Sport José Gálvez (1)	Atlético Peruano	Sport Alianza	—^{[G]}	
5	1916	Sport José Gálvez (2)	Jorge Chávez N°1	Sport Alianza	—^{[G]}	
6	1917	Sport Juan Bielovucic (1)	Sport Alianza	Unión Miraflores	—^{[G]}	
7	1918	Sport Alianza (1)	Jorge Chávez	Sportivo Tarapacá	—^{[G]}	(Peru) Guillermo Rivero (Sport Alianza; 18 goals)
8	1919	Sport Alianza (2)	Sport Sáenz Peña	Sport Juan Bielovucic	—^{[G]}	(Peru) Guillermo Rivero (Sport Alianza; 15 goals)
9	1920	Sport Inca (1)	Sport Progreso	Sport Alianza	—^{[G]}	
10	1921	Sport Progreso (1)	Jorge Chávez	Sport Alianza	—^{[G]}	
–	1922–25	No Tournament due to scheduling and organizing conflict				
Liga Provincial de Fútbol de Lima & Callao
11	1926	Sport Progreso (2)	Sport Alianza	Sportivo Tarapacá	—^{[G]}	
12	1927	Alianza Lima (3)	Unión Buenos Aires	Circolo Sportivo Italiano	(Peru) Guillermo Rivero	
13	1928	Alianza Lima (4)	Federación Universitaria	Atlético Chalaco	(Peru) Guillermo Rivero	(Peru) Alejandro Villanueva (Alianza Lima; 10 goals)
14	1929	Federación Universitaria (1)	Circolo Sportivo Italiano	Escuela de Hidroaviación	(Peru) Andrés Rotta	(Peru) Carlos Cillóniz (Federación Universitaria; 8 goals)
15	1930	Atlético Chalaco (1)	Alianza Lima	Federación Universitaria	(Peru) Telmo Carbajo	(Peru) Manuel Puente (Atlético Chalaco; 5 goals)
16	1931	Alianza Lima (5)	Sporting Tabaco	Alianza Frigorífico	(Peru) Guillermo Rivero	(Peru) Alejandro Villanueva (Alianza Lima; 16 goals)
17	1932	Alianza Lima (6)	Federación Universitaria	Sporting Tabaco	(Peru) Guillermo Rivero	(Peru) Teodoro Fernández (Federación Universitaria; 11 goals)
18	1933	Alianza Lima (7)	Universitario de Deportes	Ciclista Lima	(Peru) Guillermo Rivero	(Peru) Teodoro Fernández (Universitario; 9 goals)
19	1934	Universitario de Deportes (2)	Alianza Lima	Sucre	(Peru) Astengo, Denegri, Galindo	(Peru) Teodoro Fernández (Universitario; 9 goals)
20	1935	Sport Boys (1)	Alianza Lima	Universitario de Deportes	—	(Peru) Jorge Alcalde (Sport Boys; 5 goals)
División de Honor
–	1936	League not played due to Peruvian participation in the 1936 Summer Olympics. (See: 1936 Torneo Extraordinario de la División de Honor)				
21	1937	Sport Boys (2)	Alianza Lima	Universitario de Deportes	(Peru) Víctor Alcalde	(Peru) Juan Flores (Mariscal Sucre; 10 goals)
22	1938	Deportivo Municipal (1)	Sport Boys	Universitario de Deportes	—	(Peru) Jorge Alcalde (Sport Boys; 8 goals)
23	1939	Universitario de Deportes (3)	Sucre	Deportivo Municipal	(England) Jack Greenwell	(Peru) Teodoro Fernández (Universitario; 15 goals)
24	1940	Deportivo Municipal (2)	Universitario de Deportes	Alianza Lima	—	(Peru) Teodoro Fernández (Universitario; 15 goals)
Campeonato de Selección y Competencia
25	1941	Universitario de Deportes (4)	Deportivo Municipal	Alianza Lima	(Peru) Arturo Fernández	(Peru) Jorge Cabrejos (Deportivo Municipal; 13 goals)
26	1942	Sport Boys (3)	Deportivo Municipal	Universitario de Deportes	(Peru) José Arana Cruz	(Peru) Teodoro Fernández (Universitario; 11 goals)
27	1943	Deportivo Municipal (3)	Alianza Lima	Sport Boys	(Peru) Juan Valdivieso	(Peru) Germán Cerro (Alianza Lima; 9 goals)
28	1944	Sucre (1)	Deportivo Municipal	Universitario de Deportes	(Peru) Alfonso Huapaya	(Peru) Víctor Espinoza (Universitario; 16 goals)
29	1945	Universitario de Deportes (5)	Deportivo Municipal	Atlético Chalaco	(Peru) Arturo Fernández	(Peru) Teodoro Fernández (Universitario; 16 goals)
30	1946	Universitario de Deportes (6)	Deportivo Municipal	Sport Boys	(Peru) Arturo Fernández	(Peru) Valeriano López (Sport Boys; 22 goals)
31	1947	Atlético Chalaco (2)	Deportivo Municipal	Sport Boys	(Peru) José Arana Cruz	(Peru) Valeriano López (Sport Boys; 20 goals)
32	1948	Alianza Lima (8)	Atlético Chalaco	Sporting Tabaco	(Peru) Adelfo Magallanes	(Peru) Valeriano López (Sport Boys; 20 goals)
33	1949	Universitario de Deportes (7)	Mariscal Sucre	Sporting Tabaco	(Peru) Arturo Fernández	(Peru) Juan Emilio Salinas (Alianza Lima; 18 goals)
34	1950	Deportivo Municipal (4)	Sport Boys	Sporting Tabaco	(Peru) Juan Valdivieso	(Peru) Alberto Terry (Universitario; 16 goals)
Campeonato Profesional de la Primera División
35	1951	Sport Boys (4)	Deportivo Municipal	Mariscal Sucre	(Peru) Alfonso Huapaya	(Peru) Valeriano López (Sport Boys; 31 goals)
36	1952	Alianza Lima (9)	Sport Boys	Sporting Tabaco	(Peru) Luis Guzmán	(Peru) Juan Emilio Salinas (Alianza Lima; 22 goals)
37	1953	Mariscal Sucre (2)	Alianza Lima	Sporting Tabaco	(Peru) Carlos Iturrizaga	(Argentina) Gualberto Blanco (Atlético Chalaco; 17 goals)
38	1954	Alianza Lima (10)	Sporting Tabaco	Universitario de Deportes	(Peru) Adelfo Magallanes	(Peru) Vicente Villanueva (Sporting Tabaco; 14 goals)
39	1955	Alianza Lima (11)	Universitario de Deportes	Centro Iqueño	(Peru) Adelfo Magallanes	(Peru) Máximo Mosquera (Alianza Lima; 11 goals)
40	1956	Sporting Cristal (1)	Alianza Lima	Deportivo Municipal	(Chile) Luis Tirado	(Peru) Daniel Ruiz (Universitario; 16 goals)
41	1957	Centro Iqueño (1)	Atlético Chalaco	Alianza Lima	(Uruguay) Roberto Scarone	(Peru) Daniel Ruiz (Universitario; 20 goals)
42	1958	Sport Boys (5)	Atlético Chalaco	Mariscal Castilla	(Peru) Marcos Calderón	(Peru) Juan Joya (Alianza Lima; 17 goals)
43	1959	Universitario de Deportes (8)	Sport Boys	Centro Iqueño	(Peru) Segundo Castillo	(Peru) Daniel Ruiz (Universitario; 28 goals)
44	1960	Universitario de Deportes (9)	Sport Boys	Sporting Cristal	(Peru) Segundo Castillo	(Peru) Fernando Olaechea (Centro Iqueño; 18 goals)
45	1961	Sporting Cristal (2)	Alianza Lima	Centro Iqueño	(Peru) Juan Honores	(Peru) Alberto Gallardo (Sporting Cristal; 18 goals)
46	1962	Alianza Lima (12)	Sporting Cristal	Universitario de Deportes	(Brazil) Jaime de Almeida	(Peru) Alberto Gallardo (Sporting Cristal; 22 goals)
47	1963	Alianza Lima (13)	Sporting Cristal	Universitario de Deportes	(Brazil) Jaime de Almeida	(Peru) Pedro Pablo León (Alianza Lima; 13 goals) (Peru) Alejandro Guzmán (Universitario; 13 goals)
48	1964	Universitario de Deportes (10)	Alianza Lima	Deportivo Municipal	(Peru) Marcos Calderón	(Peru) Ángel Uribe (Universitario; 15 goals)
49	1965	Alianza Lima (14)	Universitario de Deportes	Defensor Arica	(Brazil) Jaime de Almeida	(Peru) Carlos Urrunaga (Defensor Lima; 16 goals)
Torneo Descentralizado
50	1966	Universitario de Deportes (11)	Sport Boys	Alianza Lima	(Peru) Marcos Calderón	(Peru) Teófilo Cubillas (Alianza Lima; 19 goals)
51	1967	Universitario de Deportes (12)	Sporting Cristal	Alianza Lima	(Peru) Marcos Calderón	(Peru) Pedro Pablo León (Alianza Lima; 14 goals)
52	1968	Sporting Cristal (3)	Juan Aurich	Alianza Lima	(Brazil) Didí	(Peru) Oswaldo Ramírez (Sport Boys; 26 goals)
53	1969	Universitario de Deportes (13)	Defensor Arica	Deportivo Municipal	(Uruguay) Roberto Scarone	(Peru) Jaime Mosquera (Deportivo Municipal; 15 goals)
54	1970	Sporting Cristal (4)	Universitario de Deportes	Defensor Arica	(Argentina) Vito Andrés Bártoli	(Peru) Teófilo Cubillas (Alianza Lima; 22 goals)
55	1971	Universitario de Deportes (14)	Alianza Lima	Defensor Lima	(Uruguay) Roberto Scarone	(Peru) Manuel Mellán (Deportivo Municipal; 25 goals)
56	1972	Sporting Cristal (5)	Universitario de Deportes	Deportivo Municipal	(Peru) Marcos Calderón	(Peru) Francisco Gonzales (Defensor Lima; 20 goals)
57	1973	Defensor Lima (1)	Sporting Cristal	Universitario de Deportes	(Uruguay) Roque Máspoli	(Peru) Francisco Gonzales (Defensor Lima; 25 goals)
58	1974	Universitario de Deportes (15)	Unión Huaral	Defensor Lima	(Uruguay) Juan Hohberg	(Peru) Pablo Muchotrigo (Cienciano; 32 goals)
59	1975	Alianza Lima (15)	Alfonso Ugarte	Universitario de Deportes	(Peru) Marcos Calderón	(Peru) José Leyva (Alfonso Ugarte; 25 goals)
60	1976	Unión Huaral (1)	Sport Boys	Juan Aurich	(Peru) Moisés Barack	(Peru) Alejandro Luces (Unión Huaral; 17 goals)
61	1977	Alianza Lima (16)	Sporting Cristal	Melgar	(Uruguay) Juan Hohberg	(Peru) Freddy Ravello (Alianza Lima; 21 goals)
62	1978	Alianza Lima (17)	Universitario de Deportes	Sporting Cristal	(Uruguay) Juan Hohberg	(Peru) Juan José Oré (Universitario; 19 goals)
63	1979	Sporting Cristal (6)	Atlético Chalaco	Juan Aurich	(Peru) Marcos Calderón	(Peru) José Leyva (Alfonso Ugarte; 28 goals)
64	1980	Sporting Cristal (7)	Atlético Torino	ADT	(Peru) Marcos Calderón	(Peru) Oswaldo Ramírez (Sporting Cristal; 18 goals)
65	1981	Melgar (1)	Deportivo Municipal	Universitario de Deportes	(Peru) Máximo Carrasco	(Peru) José Carranza (Alianza Lima; 15 goals)
66	1982	Universitario (16)	Alianza Lima	Juan Aurich	(Uruguay) Roberto Scarone	(Peru) Percy Rojas (Universitario de Deportes; 19 goals)
67	1983	Sporting Cristal (8)	Melgar	Universitario de Deportes	(Paraguay) César Cubilla	(Peru) Juan Caballero (Sporting Cristal; 29 goals)
68	1984	Sport Boys (6)	Universitario de Deportes	Melgar	(Peru) Marcos Calderón	(Peru) Jaime Drago (Universitario; 13 goals) (Peru) Francisco Montero (Atlético Torino; 13 goals)
69	1985	Universitario de Deportes (17)	UTC	Los Espartanos	(Peru) Marcos Calderón	(Peru) Genaro Neyra (Melgar; 22 goals)
70	1986	San Agustín (1)	Alianza Lima	—^{[F]}	(Peru) Fernando Cuéllar	(Peru) Juvenal Briceño (Melgar; 16 goals)
71	1987	Universitario de Deportes (18)	Alianza Lima	—^{[F]}	(Peru) Juan Carlos Oblitas	(Peru) Fidel Suárez (Universitario; 20 goals)
72	1988	Sporting Cristal (9)	Universitario de Deportes	—^{[F]}	(Peru) Alberto Gallardo	(Peru) Alberto Mora (Octavio Espinosa; 15 goals)
73	1989	Unión Huaral (2)	Sporting Cristal	—^{[F]}	(Serbia) Simo Vilic	(Peru) Carlos Delgado (Carlos A. Mannucci; 14 goals)
74	1990	Universitario (19)	Sport Boys	—^{[F]}	(Peru) Fernando Cuéllar	(Brazil) Cláudio Adão (Sport Boys; 31 goals)
75	1991	Sporting Cristal (10)	Sport Boys	—^{[F]}	(Peru) Juan Carlos Oblitas	(Argentina) Horacio Baldessari (Sporting Cristal; 25 goals)
76	1992	Universitario de Deportes (20)	Sporting Cristal	Melgar^{[A]}	(Serbia) Ivica Brzić	(Brazil) Marquinho (Sport Boys; 18 goals)
77	1993	Universitario de Deportes (21)	Alianza Lima	Sporting Cristal	(Uruguay) Sergio Markarián	(Peru) Waldir Sáenz (Alianza Lima; 31 goals)
78	1994	Sporting Cristal (11)	Alianza Lima	Deportivo Sipesa	(Peru) Juan Carlos Oblitas	(Peru) Flavio Maestri (Sporting Cristal; 25 goals)
79	1995	Sporting Cristal (12)	Universitario de Deportes	Alianza Lima	(Peru) Juan Carlos Oblitas	(Brazil) Julinho (Sporting Cristal; 23 goals)
80	1996	Sporting Cristal (13)	Alianza Lima	Universitario de Deportes	(Uruguay) Sergio Markarián	(Argentina) Adrián Czornomaz (Universitario; 20 goals) (Peru) Waldir Sáenz (Alianza Lima; 20 goals)
81	1997	Alianza Lima (18)	Sporting Cristal	Universitario de Deportes	(Colombia) Jorge Luis Pinto	(Peru) Ricardo Zegarra (Alianza Atlético; 17 goals)
82	1998	Universitario de Deportes (22)	Sporting Cristal	Alianza Lima	(Argentina) Osvaldo Piazza	(Brazil) Nílson (Sporting Cristal; 25 goals)
83	1999	Universitario de Deportes (23)	Alianza Lima	Sporting Cristal	(Peru) Roberto Chale	(Peru) Ysrael Zúñiga (Melgar; 32 goals)
84	2000	Universitario de Deportes (24)	Sporting Cristal	Sport Boys	(Peru) Roberto Chale	(Brazil) Eduardo Esidio (Universitario; 37 goals)
85	2001	Alianza Lima (19)	Cienciano	Sporting Cristal	(Spain) Bernabé Herráez	(Peru) Jorge Ramírez (Deportivo Wanka; 21 goals)
86	2002	Sporting Cristal (14)	Universitario de Deportes	Alianza Lima	(Brazil) Paulo Autuori	(Argentina) Luis Fabián Artime (Melgar; 24 goals)
87	2003	Alianza Lima (20)	Sporting Cristal	Cienciano	(Argentina) Gustavo Costas	(Argentina) Luis Bonnet (Sporting Cristal; 20 goals)
88	2004	Alianza Lima (21)	Sporting Cristal	Cienciano	(Argentina) Gustavo Costas	(Uruguay) Gabriel García (Melgar; 35 goals)
89	2005	Sporting Cristal (15)	Cienciano	Universitario de Deportes	(Peru) José del Solar	(Peru) Miguel Mostto (Cienciano; 18 goals)
90	2006	Alianza Lima (22)	Cienciano	Sporting Cristal	(Uruguay) Gerardo Pelusso	(Peru) Miguel Mostto (Cienciano; 22 goals)
91	2007	Universidad San Martín (1)	Coronel Bolognesi	Cienciano	(Peru) Víctor Rivera	(Peru) Johan Fano (Universitario; 19 goals)
92	2008	Universidad San Martín (2)	Universitario de Deportes	Sporting Cristal	(Peru) Víctor Rivera	(Uruguay) Miguel Ximénez (Sporting Cristal; 32 goals)
93	2009	Universitario de Deportes (25)	Alianza Lima	Juan Aurich	(Peru) Juan Reynoso	(Paraguay) Richard Estigarribia (Total Chalaco; 23 goals)
94	2010	Universidad San Martín (3)	León de Huánuco	Alianza Lima	(Uruguay) Aníbal Ruiz	(Argentina) Héber Arriola (Universidad San Martín; 24 goals)
95	2011	Juan Aurich (1)	Alianza Lima	Sport Huancayo	(Colombia) Diego Umaña	(Panama) Luis Tejada (Juan Aurich; 17 goals)
96	2012	Sporting Cristal (16)	Real Garcilaso	Universidad César Vallejo	(Peru) Roberto Mosquera	(Peru) Andy Pando (Real Garcilaso; 27 goals)
97	2013	Universitario de Deportes (26)	Real Garcilaso	Sporting Cristal	(Argentina) Ángel Comizzo	(Peru) Raúl Ruidíaz (Universitario; 21 goals) (Peru) Víctor Rossel (Unión Comercio; 21 goals)
98	2014	Sporting Cristal (17)	Juan Aurich	Alianza Lima	(Argentina) Daniel Ahmed	(Uruguay) Santiago Silva (Universidad San Martín; 23 goals)
99	2015	Melgar (2)	Sporting Cristal	Universidad César Vallejo	(Peru) Juan Reynoso	(Colombia) Lionard Pajoy (Unión Comercio; 25 goals)
100	2016	Sporting Cristal (18)	Melgar	Universitario de Deportes	(Argentina) Mariano Soso	(Colombia) Robinson Aponzá (Alianza Atlético; 30 goals)
101	2017	Alianza Lima (23)	Real Garcilaso	Melgar	(Uruguay) Pablo Bengoechea	(Peru) Irven Ávila (Sporting Cristal; 22 goals)
102	2018	Sporting Cristal (19)	Alianza Lima	Melgar	(Chile) Mario Salas	(Argentina) Emanuel Herrera (Sporting Cristal; 40 goals)
Liga 1
103	2019	Binacional (1)	Alianza Lima	Sporting Cristal	(Peru) Roberto Mosquera	(Argentina) Bernardo Cuesta (Melgar; 27 goals)
104	2020	Sporting Cristal (20)	Universitario de Deportes	Ayacucho	(Peru) Roberto Mosquera	(Argentina) Emanuel Herrera (Sporting Cristal; 20 goals)
105	2021	Alianza Lima (24)	Sporting Cristal	Universitario de Deportes	(Argentina) Carlos Bustos	(Peru) Luis Iberico (Melgar; 12 goals) (Uruguay) Felipe Rodríguez (Carlos A. Mannucci; 12 goals)
106	2022	Alianza Lima (25)	Melgar	Sporting Cristal	(Peru) Guillermo Salas	(Peru) Luis Benítes (Sport Huancayo; 19 goals)
107	2023	Universitario de Deportes (27)	Alianza Lima	Sporting Cristal	(Uruguay) Jorge Fossati	(Argentina) Santiago Giordana (Deportivo Garcilaso; 22 goals)
108	2024	Universitario de Deportes (28)	Sporting Cristal	Melgar	(Argentina) Fabián Bustos	(Uruguay) Martín Cauteruccio (Sporting Cristal; 35 goals)
109	2025	Universitario de Deportes (29)	Cusco	Sporting Cristal	(Uruguay) Jorge Fossati	(Argentina) Facundo Callejo (Cusco; 25 goals)
110	2026					

== Clubs ==
Universitario and Alianza Lima have a clear advantage of titles won over the other clubs in Peru. They have won a combined total of 52 Primera División championships of the 108 seasons contested, 28 and 25 respectively. Sporting Cristal trails behind with 20 professional era titles since their debut in 1956 and further behind is the traditional Sport Boys having conquered 6 league titles. Newcomer Universidad de San Martín de Porres has begun to challenge the dominance of the Big Three with back-to-back titles in 2007 and 2008 and a third i 2010. In addition, Melgar and Unión Huaral are the only clubs outside the metropolitan area of Lima to have won a national championship. Other noteworthy clubs to have won championships include 4-time winner Deportivo Municipal.

Universitario is the club with the longest spell in the Primera División, playing since 1928 when they debuted in the Primera División. They are followed by archrivals Alianza Lima who competed in the first edition of the Primera División but were relegated in 1938 and returning a year later for an uninterrupted spell since 1940. Melgar is the team with the longest run in the Primera División outside Lima, competing since 1971.

The oldest clubs currently participating in the Primera División are Alianza Lima and Cienciano which were founded at the beginning of the turn of the century in 1901. The newest clubs active in the Primera División include Ayacucho, Sport Huancayo, Cusco and Universidad de San Martín. The current Juan Aurich participating in the Descentralizado is not the same club that competed in previous seasons.

As of 2025, Universitario, Alianza Lima and Sporting Cristal have won 28, 25 and 20 official league titles respectively. They are regarded as the Big Three of Peru. However, other teams have risen to new heights. In particular, a team from Cusco, Cienciano, has been the only Peruvian team to win international tournaments || Copa Sudamericana 2003 and Recopa Sudamericana 2004 ||, though it has yet to win the domestic league title. Other notable teams include Binacional, Juan Aurich, Melgar and Unión Huaral, which are the only non-capital teams to have won a national championship.

Titles won by club (%)
1. Universitario - 29 (26.6%)
2. Alianza Lima - 25 (22.9%)
3. Sporting Cristal – 20 (18.3%)
4. Sport Boys – 6 (5.50%)
5. Deportivo Municipal – 4 (3.67%)
6. Universidad San Martín – 3 (2.75%)
7. Other Teams - 22 (20.2%)

=== Titles by club ===
Club	Total	Amateur era (1912–1950)		Professional era (1951–)		
Club	Total	Liga Peruana de Football Lima & Callao (1912–21)	Liga Provincial Lima & Callao (1926–50)	Liga Provincial Lima & Callao (1951–65)	Descentralizado (1966–2018)	Liga 1 (2019–)
Universitario de Deportes^{[C]}	29	—	7	3	16	3
Alianza Lima^{[D]}	25	2	6	6	9	2
Sporting Cristal	20	—	—	2	17	1
Sport Boys	6	—	3	2	1	0
Deportivo Municipal	4	—	4	0	0	0
Universidad San Martín	3	—	—	—	3	0
Atlético Chalaco	2	—	2	0	0	0
Melgar	2	—	—	—	2	0
Mariscal Sucre	2	—	1	1	0	—
Lima Cricket	2	2	0	0	0	0
Unión Huaral	2	—	—	—	2	0
Sport Progreso	2	1	1	—	—	—
Sport José Gálvez ^{[F]}	2	2	0	—	—	—
Juan Aurich	1	—	—	—	1	0
Jorge Chávez N°1	1	1	0	—	—	—
Binacional	1	—	—	—	0	1
Centro Iqueño	1	—	0	1	0	—
Defensor Lima	1	—	0	0	1	0
San Agustín	1	—	—	—	1	—
Sport Juan Bielovucic	1	1	—	—	—	—
Sport Inca	1	1	—	—	—	—

== Titles by club ==
- There are 21 clubs who have won the Peruvian title.
- Teams in **bold** compete in the Liga 1 as of the 2026 season.
- Italics indicates clubs that no longer exist or disaffiliated from the FPF.

Rank	Club	Winners	Runners-up	Winning years	Runners-up years
1	**Universitario de Deportes**	29	15	1929, 1934, 1939, 1941, 1945, 1946, 1949, 1959, 1960, 1964, 1966, 1967, 1969, 1971, 1974, 1982, 1985, 1987, 1990, 1992, 1993, 1998, 1999, 2000, 2009, 2013, 2023, 2024, 2025	1928, 1932, 1933, 1940, 1955, 1965, 1970, 1972, 1978, 1984, 1988, 1995, 2002, 2008, 2020
2	**Alianza Lima**	25	25	1918, 1919, 1927, 1928, 1931, 1932, 1933, 1948, 1952, 1954, 1955, 1962, 1963, 1965, 1975, 1977, 1978, 1997, 2001, 2003, 2004, 2006, 2017, 2021, 2022	1914, 1917, 1926, 1930, 1934, 1935, 1937, 1943, 1953, 1956, 1961, 1964, 1971, 1982, 1986, 1987, 1993, 1994, 1996, 1999, 2009, 2011, 2018, 2019, 2023
3	**Sporting Cristal**	20	15	1956, 1961, 1968, 1970, 1972, 1979, 1980, 1983, 1988, 1991, 1994, 1995, 1996, 2002, 2005, 2012, 2014, 2016, 2018, 2020	1962, 1963, 1967, 1973, 1977, 1989, 1992, 1997, 1998, 2000, 2003, 2004, 2015, 2021, 2024
4	**Sport Boys**	6	9	1935, 1937, 1942, 1951, 1958, 1984	1938, 1950, 1952, 1959, 1960, 1966, 1976, 1990, 1991
5	Deportivo Municipal	4	8	1938, 1940, 1943, 1950	1941, 1942, 1944, 1945, 1946, 1947, 1951, 1981
6	Universidad San Martín	3	—	2007, 2008, 2010	—
7	Atlético Chalaco	2	4	1930, 1947	1948, 1957, 1958, 1979
7	**Melgar**	2	3	1981, 2015	1983, 2016, 2022
7	Mariscal Sucre	2	2	1944, 1953	1939, 1949
7	Lima Cricket	2	1	1912, 1914	1913
7	Unión Huaral	2	1	1976, 1989	1974
7	Sport Progreso	2	1	1921, 1926	1920
7	Sport José Gálvez	2	—	1915, 1916	—
14	Juan Aurich	1	2	2011	1968, 2014
14	Jorge Chávez N°1	1	1	1913	1916
14	Binacional	1	—	2019	—
14	Centro Iqueño	1	—	1957	—
14	Defensor Lima	1	—	1973	—
14	San Agustín	1	—	1986	—
14	Sport Juan Bielovucic	1	—	1917	—
14	Sport Inca	1	—	1920	—

== Titles by region ==
Region	Nº of titles	Clubs
Lima	97	Universitario de Deportes (29), Alianza Lima (25), Sporting Cristal (20), Deportivo Municipal (4), Universidad San Martín (3), Sport José Gálvez (2), Lima Cricket (2), Mariscal Sucre (2), Sport Progreso (2), Unión Huaral (2), Centro Iqueño (1), San Agustín (1), Defensor Lima (1), Jorge Chávez N°1 (1), Sport Inca (1), Sport Juan Bielovucic (1)
Callao	8	Sport Boys (6), Atlético Chalaco (2)
Arequipa	2	Melgar (2)
(Department of Lambayeque) Lambayeque	1	Juan Aurich (1)
Puno	1	Binacional (1)

== Title definitions ==
Several matches to define champions have been played over the course of Peruvian football history. The earliest title-defining matches were played between teams that tied for first place at the end of the season or tournament phase and forced an extra match to determine the champion. Eventually, finals were organized to be played at the end of the season after set conditions were fulfilled or tournament winners. The first of these finals started in the eighties when winners of each regional tournament played each other to determine the season champion; if the same team won both tournaments, they were champions by default. In the late nineties the Apertura and Clausura tournaments were hosted so that the winners of each tournament would also face each other in the final. If the same team won both tournaments, they were champions by default.

In 2001, Alianza Lima won the Apertura tournament, but their performance in the Clausura tournament suffered and placed a shocking 10th place—which led to a rule change. A tournament-winning team had to place above a set place in order to be able to play the final. In the cases of the seasons of 2002, 2007 and 2008, one or both of the tournament winners failed to place above a set position therefore no final was played and the season champion was determined by the aggregate table or by the tournament winner that had satisfied the set conditions.

=== Key ===
Match went to extra time †
Match decided by a penalty shootout after extra time
Match replayed

=== List of finals ===
Year	Winner	Score	Runner-up	Venue		
1986	San Agustín	1–0	Alianza Lima	Estadio Nacional		
1987	Universitario de Deportes	1–0	Alianza Lima	Estadio Nacional		
1988	Sporting Cristal	2–1	Universitario de Deportes	Estadio Nacional		
1989	Unión Huaral	1–0	Sporting Cristal	Estadio Nacional		
1990	Universitario de Deportes	4–2	Sport Boys	Estadio Nacional		
Year	Winner	Agg.	Runner-up	1st leg	2nd leg	3rd leg
1998	Universitario de Deportes	3–3 (4–2 p)	Sporting Cristal	1–2	2–1	–
1999	Universitario de Deportes	3–1	Alianza Lima	3–0	0–1	–
2001	Alianza Lima	3–3 (4–2 p)	Cienciano	3–2	0–1	–
2003	Alianza Lima	2–1^{†}	Sporting Cristal	Single match		
2004	Alianza Lima	0–0*	Sporting Cristal	Single match		
2005	Sporting Cristal	1–0	Cienciano	Single match		
2006	Alianza Lima	3–2	Cienciano	0–1	3–1	–
2009	Universitario de Deportes	2–0	Alianza Lima	1–0	1–0	–
2010	Universidad San Martín	3–2	León de Huánuco	1–1	2–1	–
2011	Juan Aurich	2–2*	Alianza Lima	1–2	0–1	0–0
2012	Sporting Cristal	2–0	Real Garcilaso	1–0	1–0	–
2013	Universitario de Deportes	5–3*	Real Garcilaso	2–3	3–0	1–1
2014	Sporting Cristal	5–4	Juan Aurich	2–2	0–0	3–2
2015	Melgar	5–4	Sporting Cristal	2–2	3–2	–
2016	Sporting Cristal	1–1	Melgar	1–1	0–0	–
2018	Sporting Cristal	7–1	Alianza Lima	4–1	3–0	–
2019	Binacional	4–3	Alianza Lima	4–1	0–2	–
2020	Sporting Cristal	3–2	Universitario de Deportes	2–1	1–1	–
2021	Alianza Lima	1–0	Sporting Cristal	1–0	0–0	–
2022	Alianza Lima	2–1	Melgar	0–1	2–0	–
2023	Universitario de Deportes	3–1	Alianza Lima	1–1	2–0	–

=== Other definitions ===
These matches were played when teams were tied for first in the general league or in a specific tournament.

Year	Winner	Score	Runner-up	Venue	In contention
1928	Alianza Lima	1–1	Federación Universitaria	Stadium Nacional	1928 Campeonato de Selección y Competencia
Replay	Alianza Lima	2–0	Federación Universitaria	Stadium Nacional	1928 Campeonato de Selección y Competencia
1935	Universitario de Deportes	2–1	Alianza Lima	Stadium Nacional	1934 Torneo de Primeros Equipos
1955	Alianza Lima	2–1	Universitario de Deportes	Estadio Nacional	1955 Campeonato Profesional de Lima
1961	Sporting Cristal	2–0	Alianza Lima	Estadio Nacional	1961 Campeonato Profesional de Lima
1968	Sporting Cristal	2–1	Juan Aurich	Estadio Nacional	1968 Torneo Descentralizado
1976	Unión Huaral	2–0	Sport Boys	Estadio Nacional	1976 Torneo Descentralizado
1989	Sporting Cristal	2–0	Alianza Atlético	Estadio Nacional	1989 Torneo Regional I
1990	Universitario de Deportes	1–0	Alianza Lima	Estadio Nacional	1990 Torneo Regional II
1991	Sporting Cristal	1–0	Sport Boys	Estadio Nacional	1991 Torneo Regional I
1991	Sporting Cristal	1–1*	Universitario de Deportes	Estadio Nacional	1991 Torneo Regional II
1998	Sporting Cristal	1–0	Alianza Lima	Estadio Nacional	1998 Torneo Clausura
2001	Alianza Lima	2–1	Sporting Cristal	Estadio Nacional	2001 Torneo Apertura
2001	Cienciano	1–0	Estudiantes de Medicina	Estadio UNSA	2001 Torneo Clausura
2002	Universitario de Deportes	1–0; 0–0	Alianza Lima	Estadio Monumental; Estadio Mansiche	2002 Torneo Apertura
2006	Cienciano	2–1	Universitario de Deportes	Estadio Mansiche	2006 Torneo Clausura
2014	Sporting Cristal	1–0	Alianza Lima	Estadio UNSA	2014 Torneo Clausura
2015	Melgar	1–1*	Real Garcilaso	Estadio Miguel Grau	2015 Torneo Clausura
2020	Ayacucho	1–1*	Sporting Cristal	Estadio Monumental	2020 Fase 2
2021	Sporting Cristal	2–0	Universidad San Martín	Estadio Alejandro Villanueva	2021 Fase 1

== Half-year / Short tournaments ==
=== Torneo de Primeros Equipos ===
The Torneo de Primeros Equipos was a football championship that was played in Peru between 1931 and 1934. The tournament was part of the Campeonato de Selección y Competencia of the Peruvian Primera División. The sum of points from this tournament plus the fourth part of the Torneo de Equipos de Reserva (Reserve Tournament) gave the title of Campeón Absoluto (Absolute Champion) of the First Division.

Season	Champion	Runner-up	Third Place
1931	Alianza Lima	Sporting Tabaco	Atlético Chalaco
1932	Alianza Lima	Federación Universitaria	Sporting Tabaco
1933	Alianza Lima	Universitario de Deportes	Sucre
1934	Universitario de Deportes	Alianza Lima	Sport Boys

=== Parallel tournaments ===
These were the filler tournaments played parallel to or in between the national championship. Some of these tournaments awarded the winning clubs with a qualification to an international tournament or guaranteed a spot in a further round whilst two of these filler tournaments did not award anything to its winner. The purpose of these tournaments was so that the national team could participate in its compromises without affecting the national championship when calling domestic players.

Season			Champion	Runner-up	Award
1969	Apertura		Atlético Grau	Universitario de Deportes	Advanced to end-of-season Liguilla
1972	Interzonal	Metropolitano	Sporting Cristal	Defensor Lima	Advanced to end-of-season Liguilla
1972	Interzonal	Regional	José Gálvez	Unión Tumán	Advanced to end-of-season Liguilla
1977	Interzonal	Grupo A	Alianza Lima	CNI	Advanced to end-of-season Liguilla
1977	Interzonal	Grupo B	Coronel Bolognesi	Unión Huaral	Advanced to end-of-season Liguilla
1978	Interzonal		Unión Huaral	Coronel Bolognesi	None
1981	Regional		Deportivo Municipal	Universitario de Deportes	Advanced to Copa Libertadores second berth play-off
1989	Torneo Plácido Galindo		Defensor Lima	Universitario de Deportes	Advanced to Torneo Regional II end-of-season pre-Liguilla
1992	Liguilla Pre-Libertadores		Sporting Cristal	Ovación Sipesa	Qualified for 1993 Copa Libertadores
1993	Liguilla Pre-Libertadores		Alianza Lima	Sporting Cristal	Qualified for 1994 Copa Libertadores
1994	Apertura		Sporting Cristal	Ciclista Lima	Qualified for 1995 Copa CONMEBOL
1994	Liguilla Pre-Libertadores		Alianza Lima	Deportivo Sipesa	Qualified for 1995 Copa Libertadores
1996	Liguilla Pre-Libertadores		Alianza Lima	Universitario de Deportes	Qualified for 1997 Copa Libertadores
1997	Liguilla Pre-Libertadores		Sporting Cristal	Universitario de Deportes	Qualified for 1998 Copa Libertadores
2017	Torneo de Verano		Melgar	UTC	Qualified for 2018 Copa Libertadores
2018	Torneo de Verano		Sporting Cristal	Sport Huancayo	Qualified for 2018 Torneo Descentralizado Semifinals

=== Torneos Zonales seasons ===
Season			Champion	Runner-up	Third place
1984	Zona Metropolitana		Universitario de Deportes	Alianza Lima	Sporting Cristal
1984	Zona Norte		Atlético Torino	Sport Pilsen	UTC
1984	Zona Centro		ADT	Huancayo	Defensor ANDA
1984	Zona Sur		Melgar	Diablos Rojos	Coronel Bolognesi
1985	Zona Metropolitana		Alianza Lima	Deportivo Municipal	CNI
1985	Zona Norte		Carlos A. Mannucci	Los Espartanos	UTC
1985	Zona Centro		ADT	Deportivo Junín	Deportivo COOPTRIP
1985	Zona Sur		Coronel Bolognesi	Melgar	Alfonso Ugarte
1986	Zona Metropolitana		Sporting Cristal	Alianza Lima	San Agustín
1986	Zona Norte		UTC	Hungaritos Agustinos	Atlético Grau
1986	Zona Centro		Deportivo Pucallpa	ADT	Defensor ANDA
1986	Zona Sur		Melgar	Cienciano	Coronel Bolognesi
1987	Zona Metropolitana		Universitario de Deportes	Unión Huaral	San Agustín
1987	Zona Norte		Carlos A. Mannucci	UTC	Hungaritos Agustinos
1987	Zona Centro		Deportivo Junín	Unión Minas	Deportivo Pucallpa
1987	Zona Sur		Coronel Bolognesi	Alfonso Ugarte	Cienciano
1988	Zona Metropolitana	Grupo A	Universitario de Deportes	San Agustín	Sporting Cristal
1988	Zona Metropolitana	Grupo B	Unión Huaral	Octavio Espinosa	Deportivo Municipal
1988	Zona Norte		Alianza Atlético	UTC	Carlos A. Mannucci
1988	Zona Centro		Deportivo Junín	Mina San Vicente	Unión Minas
1988	Zona Sur		Cienciano	Melgar	Coronel Bolognesi
1989–I	Zona Metropolitana		Alianza Lima	Sporting Cristal	Unión Huaral
1989–I	Zona Norte		Alianza Atlético		
1989–I	Zona Centro		Mina San Vicente		
1989–I	Zona Oriente		Unión Tarapoto		
1989–I	Zona Sur		Aurora	Melgar	
1989–II	Zona Metropolitana		Universitario de Deportes	Sporting Cristal	
1989–II	Zona Norte		Alianza Atlético	15 de Setiembre	
1989–II	Zona Centro		Mina San Vicente		
1989–II	Zona Oriente		CNI		
1989–II	Zona Sur		Aurora		
1990–I	Zona Metropolitana		Universitario de Deportes	Alianza Lima	
1990–I	Zona Norte		Deportivo Pacífico	UTC	
1990–I	Zona Centro		Deportivo Junín		
1990–I	Zona Oriente		Deportivo Hospital		
1990–I	Zona Sur		Melgar	Aurora	
1990–II	Zona Metropolitana		Alianza Lima	Sport Boys	Universitario de Deportes
1990–II	Zona Norte		Alianza Atlético	UTC	—^{[H]}
1990–II	Zona Centro		ADT	Unión Minas	
1990–II	Zona Oriente		Unión Tarapoto	CNI	
1990–II	Zona Sur		Melgar	Aurora	Cienciano
1991–I	Zona Metropolitana		Sporting Cristal	Sport Boys	Alianza Lima
1991–I	Zona Norte		Carlos A. Mannucci	Deportivo Pacífico	UTC
1991–I	Zona Centro		Unión Huayllaspanca	León de Huánuco	Unión Minas
1991–I	Zona Oriente		CNI	Deportivo Bancos	
1991–I	Zona Sur		Melgar	Cienciano	Aurora
1991–II	Zona Metropolitana		Universitario de Deportes	Sport Boys	Sporting Cristal
1991–II	Zona Norte		Alianza Atlético	Atlético Grau	UTC
1991–II	Zona Centro		León de Huánuco	Unión Minas	ADT
1991–II	Zona Oriente		Deportivo Bancos	Unión Tarapoto	—^{[H]}
1991–II	Zona Sur		Melgar	Cienciano	Aurora

=== Regional and Descentralizado seasons ===
The first regional seasons began in 1984 where teams were divided into regional groups and would advance to the Descentralizado or descend to the División Intermedia for a promotion/relegation tournament against second division teams. Only the 1984 regional did not crown a champion. Starting in 1989, the Descentralizado was temporarily replaced by two regional tournaments, each crowning a champion and contesting a national season final.

Season		Champion	Runner-up	Third place
1984	Regional	No champion; only a qualification tournament		
1984	Descentralizado	Sport Boys	CNI	Alianza Lima
1985	Regional	Universitario de Deportes	CNI	—^{[H]}
1985	Descentralizado	Universitario de Deportes	UTC	Los Espartanos
1986	Regional	San Agustín	Alianza Lima	—^{[H]}
1986	Descentralizado	Alianza Lima	San Agustín	Deportivo Municipal
1987	Regional	Universitario de Deportes	Unión Huaral	San Agustín
1987	Descentralizado	Alianza Lima	Unión Huaral	Universitario de Deportes
1988	Regional	Universitario de Deportes	Unión Huaral	Alianza Atlético
1988	Descentralizado "A"	Sporting Cristal	Universitario de Deportes	Alianza Atlético
1988	Descentralizado "B"	Alianza Lima	Deportivo Cañaña	Alfonso Ugarte
1989	Regional I	Sporting Cristal	Alianza Atlético	Aurora
1989	Regional II	Unión Huaral	Universitario de Deportes	Mina San Vicente
1990	Regional I	Sport Boys	Universitario de Deportes	Unión Huaral
1990	Regional II	Universitario de Deportes	Alianza Lima	Sport Boys
1991	Regional I	Sporting Cristal	Sport Boys	Universitario de Deportes
1991	Regional II	Sporting Cristal	Universitario de Deportes	Sport Boys

=== Apertura and Clausura / Fase 1 and Fase 2 seasons ===
In 1997, the first Apertura and Clausura half-year tournaments were introduced and had its champions face each other in a season final as in the regional tournaments between 1989 and 1991. They were abolished at the end of 2008 season, and restored in 2014 to 2026.

Season		Champion	Runner-up	Third place
1997	Apertura	Alianza Lima	Sporting Cristal	Universitario de Deportes
1997	Clausura	Alianza Lima	Universitario de Deportes	Sporting Cristal
1998	Apertura	Universitario de Deportes	Sport Boys	Sporting Cristal
1998	Clausura	Sporting Cristal	Alianza Lima	Sport Boys
1999	Apertura	Universitario de Deportes	Alianza Lima	Sporting Cristal
1999	Clausura	Alianza Lima	Universitario de Deportes	Sport Boys
2000	Apertura	Universitario de Deportes	Sport Boys	Melgar
2000	Clausura	Universitario de Deportes	Sporting Cristal	Cienciano
2001	Apertura	Alianza Lima	Sporting Cristal	Melgar
2001	Clausura	Cienciano	Estudiantes de Medicina	Sporting Cristal
2002	Apertura	Universitario de Deportes	Alianza Lima	Sporting Cristal
2002	Clausura	Sporting Cristal	Alianza Lima	Alianza Atlético
2003	Apertura	Sporting Cristal	Alianza Lima	Coronel Bolognesi
2003	Clausura	Alianza Lima	Alianza Atlético	Sporting Cristal
2004	Apertura	Alianza Lima	Cienciano	Alianza Atlético
2004	Clausura	Sporting Cristal	Universidad San Martín	Cienciano
2005	Apertura	Cienciano	Universitario de Deportes	Alianza Lima
2005	Clausura	Sporting Cristal	Universidad San Martín	Coronel Bolognesi
2006	Apertura	Alianza Lima	Sporting Cristal	Coronel Bolognesi
2006	Clausura	Cienciano	Universitario de Deportes	Coronel Bolognesi
2007	Apertura	Universidad San Martín	Cienciano	Sport Áncash
2007	Clausura	Coronel Bolognesi	Universitario de Deportes	Cienciano
2008	Apertura	Universitario de Deportes	Sporting Cristal	Universidad San Martín
2008	Clausura	Universidad San Martín	Sporting Cristal	Sport Áncash
2014	Apertura	Juan Aurich	Melgar	Universidad César Vallejo
2014	Clausura	Sporting Cristal	Alianza Lima	Unión Comercio
2015	Apertura	Sporting Cristal	Melgar	Deportivo Municipal
2015	Clausura	Melgar	Real Garcilaso	Sport Huancayo
2016	Apertura	Universitario de Deportes	Sporting Cristal	Alianza Lima
2016	Clausura	Sporting Cristal	Universitario de Deportes	Melgar
2017	Apertura	Alianza Lima	Real Garcilaso	UTC
2017	Clausura	Alianza Lima	Real Garcilaso	Melgar
2018	Apertura	Sporting Cristal	Alianza Lima	Real Garcilaso
2018	Clausura	Melgar	Alianza Lima	Ayacucho
2019	Apertura	Binacional	Sporting Cristal	Universidad César Vallejo
2019	Clausura	Alianza Lima	Universitario de Deportes	Sporting Cristal
2020	Fase 1	Universitario de Deportes	Sport Huancayo	Sporting Cristal
2020	Fase 2	Ayacucho	Sporting Cristal	—^{[H]}
2021	Fase 1	Sporting Cristal	Universidad San Martín	—^{[H]}
2021	Fase 2	Alianza Lima	Sporting Cristal	Universitario de Deportes
2022	Apertura	Melgar	Sport Huancayo	Sporting Cristal
2022	Clausura	Alianza Lima	Sporting Cristal	Atlético Grau
2023	Apertura	Alianza Lima	Sporting Cristal	Universitario de Deportes
2023	Clausura	Universitario de Deportes	Melgar	Alianza Lima
2024	Apertura	Universitario de Deportes	Sporting Cristal	Melgar
2024	Clausura	Universitario de Deportes	Alianza Lima	Sporting Cristal
2025	Apertura	Universitario de Deportes	Alianza Lima	Cusco
2025	Clausura	Universitario de Deportes	Cusco	Sporting Cristal
2026	Apertura	Alianza Lima	Los Chankas	Cienciano
2026	Clausura	Sport Huancayo	Sporting Cristal	Alianza Lima

== Footnotes ==
A. Melgar is recognized as the third-placed team for 1992 regular season. Ovación Sipesa received the berth for the 1993 Copa CONMEBOL as Liguilla runner-up, however they did not participate in the 1992 regular season.
C. Includes titles as "Federación Universitaria" (until 1932).
D. Includes titles as "Sport Alianza" (Liga).
E. Liga team from Lima, not to be confused with José Gálvez from Chimbote.
F. No third team recorded so the championship was played in a two zones format, where both teams qualified first played a final.
G. During the early years of football, teams did not have designated managers; instead, leadership responsibilities were typically assumed by the players themselves, most often by the team captain, who took on both organizational and tactical roles.
H. No third team recorded so the championship was played in a two zones format, where both teams qualified first played a final.
