= 1949 Peruvian Primera División =

Campeonato de Selección y Competencia
- Season: 1949
- Dates: 26 June 1949 – 1 January 1950
- Champions: Universitario (7th title)
- Runner up: Sucre
- Relegated: none
- Matches: 84
- Goals: 329 (3.92 per match)
- Top goalscorer: Juan Emilio Salinas (18 goals)

The 1949 Campeonato de Selección y Competencia was the 33rd season of the Peruvian Primera División. Eight teams participated in the second-to-last amateur-status championship, which was played as a triple round-robin tournament. The champions were Universitario.

No team was relegated; therefore the top-flight grew to 10 teams for 1950.

== Competition format ==
All teams faced each other in a triple round-robin format. The team that accumulated the highest number of points at the end of the season was automatically crowned champion.

Two points were awarded for a win, one point for a draw, and no points for a loss.

== Teams ==
=== Team changes ===
Promoted from 1948 Segunda División	Relegated from 1948 Primera División
▲ Centro Iqueño (1st)	▼ Ciclista Lima (8th) ▼ Jorge Chávez (9th)

=== Stadia locations ===
Team	City	Mannager
Alianza Lima	La Victoria, Lima	(Peru) Juan Berastaín
Atlético Chalaco	Callao	(Peru) Raul Pardón
Centro Iqueño	Cercado de Lima	(Peru) Plácido Galindo
Deportivo Municipal	Cercado de Lima	(Peru) Juan Valdivieso
Sport Boys	Callao	(Peru) Teodoro Alcalde
Sporting Tabaco	Rímac, Lima	(Peru) José Arana
Sucre	La Victoria, Lima	(Peru) Alfonso Huapaya
Universitario	Cercado de Lima	(Peru) Arturo Fernández

== League table ==
=== Standings ===
Pos	Team	Pld	W	D	L	GF	GA	GD	Pts	Qualification or relegation
1	Universitario (C)	21	12	5	4	48	29	+19	29	Champions
2	Sucre	21	10	4	7	47	43	+4	24	
3	Sporting Tabaco	21	6	10	5	36	29	+7	22	
4	Alianza Lima	21	9	4	8	46	42	+4	22	
5	Sport Boys	21	9	4	8	45	41	+4	22	
6	Deportivo Municipal	21	9	4	8	49	48	+1	22	
7	Atlético Chalaco	21	5	5	11	31	43	−12	15	
8	Centro Iqueño	21	3	6	12	27	54	−27	12	

(C) Champions

== Results ==
=== Matches 1–14 ===
Home \ Away	ALI	CHA	IQU	MUN	SBA	TAB	SUC	UNI
Alianza Lima		1–1	6–3	4–1	1–0	0–0	0–2	1–2
Atlético Chalaco	3–5		0–1	0–2	1–4	0–3	1–1	2–0
Centro Iqueño	1–1	1–2		1–2	0–2	1–1	2–2	0–3
Deportivo Municipal	3–1	0–0	3–2		1–5	1–1	2–3	1–3
Sport Boys	5–2	2–1	2–2	2–7		1–2	5–1	1–2
Sporting Tabaco	1–1	3–0	2–2	4–4	1–1		6–3	0–0
Sucre	1–2	1–0	0–1	2–1	4–2	3–1		1–2
Universitario	0–5	2–2	7–0	3–0	2–0	2–0	2–2	

Updated to match(es) played on 1949. Source: Diario El Comercio, La Prensa and Crónica.
Legend: Blue = home team win; Yellow = draw; Red = away team win.

=== Matches 15–21 ===
Home \ Away	ALI	CHA	IQU	MUN	SBA	TAB	SUC	UNI
Alianza Lima			2–3			3–2		1–3
Atlético Chalaco	2–3			3–4	4–2		3–2	
Centro Iqueño		1–2			2–3		2–5	
Deportivo Municipal	2–4		4–1			1–3	4–2	
Sport Boys	2–1			3–3		1–0		
Sporting Tabaco		1–1	1–1				1–3	3–2
Sucre	5–2				3–1			3–3
Universitario		4–3	4–0	1–3	1–1			

Updated to match(es) played on 1949. Source: Diario El Comercio, La Prensa and Crónica.
Legend: Blue = home team win; Yellow = draw; Red = away team win.

== Torneo Equipos de Reserva ==
Alongside the Primera División championship, the Reserve Teams Tournament was played, featuring the reserve players of top-flight clubs. However, unlike the 1931–1934 period, this competition did not grant any bonus points to the first team.

=== Standings ===
Pos	Team	Pld	W	D	L	GF	GA	GD	Pts	Qualification or relegation
1	Sucre	14	8	5	1	37	24	+13	21	Champions
2	Alianza Lima	14	7	5	2	33	30	+3	19	
3	Universitario	14	8	2	4	37	25	+12	18	
4	Deportivo Municipal	14	5	2	7	34	42	−8	12	
5	Centro Iqueño	14	5	2	7	27	28	−1	12	
6	Atlético Chalaco	14	5	1	8	26	24	+2	11	
7	Sport Boys	14	3	5	6	26	33	−7	11	
8	Sporting Tabaco	14	3	2	9	21	35	−14	8	

== Top scorers ==
Rank	Player	Club	Goals
1	(Peru) Emilio Salinas	Alianza Lima	18
2	(Peru) Víctor Espinoza	Universitario	17
3	(Peru) Manuel Rivera	Deportivo Municipal	14
4	(Peru) Alberto Terry	Universitario	12
5	(Peru) Jesús Villalobos Villegas	Sucre	11
5	(Peru) Dante Rovai	Universitario	11

== See also ==
- 1949 Campeonato de Apertura
- 1949 Peruvian Segunda División
- 1949 Torneo Relámpago
