= 1952 Peruvian Primera División =

Peruvian Primera División
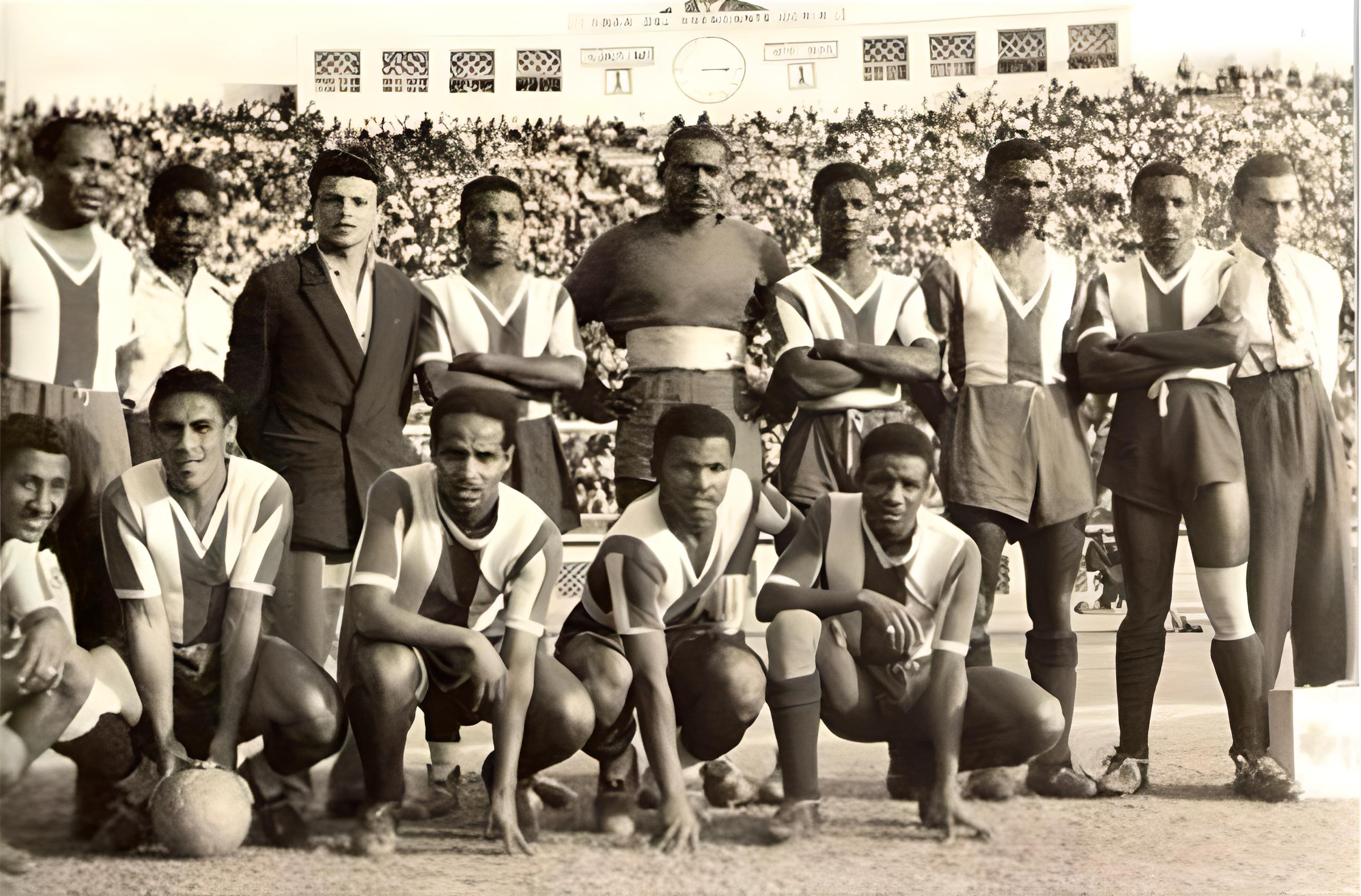
- Season: 1952
- Dates: 23 August 1952 – 11 January 1953
- Champions: Alianza Lima (9th title)
- Runner up: Sport Boys
- Relegated: Association Chorrillos
- Matches: 90
- Goals: 391 (4.34 per match)
- Top goalscorer: Juan Emilio Salinas (22 goals)

The 1952 season of the Peruvian Primera División, the top category of Peruvian football, was played by 10 teams. The national champions were Alianza Lima.

== Competition format ==
All teams faced each other in a double round-robin format, playing home and away matches. The team that accumulated the highest number of points at the end of the season was automatically crowned champion, while the team with the fewest points was relegated to the Peruvian Segunda División.

Two points were awarded for a win, one point for a draw, and no points for a loss.

== Teams ==
=== Team changes ===
Promoted from 1951 Segunda División	Relegated from 1951 Primera División
▲ Association Chorrillos (1st)	▼ Unión Callao (10th)

=== Stadia locations ===
Team	City	Mannager
Alianza Lima	La Victoria, Lima	(Peru) Adelfo Magallanes
Association Chorrillos	Chorrillos, Lima	(Argentina) Gerónimo Díaz
Atlético Chalaco	Callao	(Argentina) Francisco Villegas
Centro Iqueño	Cercado de Lima	(Peru) Jorge Pardón
Ciclista Lima	Cercado de Lima	(Peru) Victor Villavicencio
Deportivo Municipal	Cercado de Lima	(Peru) Arturo Fernández
Mariscal Sucre	La Victoria, Lima	(Argentina) Ángel Fernández Roca
Sport Boys	Callao	(Peru) Alfonso Huapaya
Sporting Tabaco	Rímac, Lima	(Argentina) José Pérez Figueiras
Universitario	Breña, Lima	(Argentina) José Cuesta Silva

== League table ==
=== Standings ===
Pos	Team	Pld	W	D	L	GF	GA	GD	Pts	Qualification or relegation
1	Alianza Lima (C)	18	12	3	3	57	30	+27	27	Champions
2	Sport Boys	18	8	6	4	41	33	+8	22	
3	Sporting Tabaco	18	9	4	5	38	34	+4	22	
4	Ciclista Lima	18	9	2	7	45	44	+1	20	
5	Centro Iqueño	18	8	3	7	38	34	+4	19	
6	Mariscal Sucre	18	8	2	8	36	37	−1	18	
7	Universitario	18	7	2	9	36	36	0	16	
8	Deportivo Municipal	18	6	3	9	45	44	+1	15	
9	Atlético Chalaco	18	5	2	11	33	44	−11	12	
10	Association Chorrillos (R)	18	3	3	12	22	55	−33	9	1953 Segunda División

(C) Champions; (R) Relegated

== Results ==
Home \ Away	ALI	CHO	CHA	IQU	CIC	MUN	SUC	SBA	TAB	UNI
Alianza Lima		5–1	3–0	4–1	4–2	3–1	2–1	3–3	1–1	3–2
Association Chorrillos	0–5		2–5	0–2	3–2	1–6	2–5	1–0	1–3	1–3
Atlético Chalaco	1–3	1–1		3–3	1–3	7–1	3–1	1–4	4–1	0–3
Centro Iqueño	2–1	0–0	1–3		4–2	4–3	4–1	1–2	3–0	4–0
Ciclista Lima	1–7	2–1	4–1	4–2		3–2	2–0	4–4	4–1	2–1
Deportivo Municipal	2–3	8–2	2–0	3–1	6–3		2–2	1–3	2–2	2–2
Mariscal Sucre	2–4	4–3	2–0	3–1	4–2	1–2		1–1	4–1	3–2
Sport Boys	5–2	1–1	3–2	2–2	0–4	1–0	3–1		1–2	5–1
Sporting Tabaco	3–3	2–0	3–1	1–0	2–0	4–2	3–0	2–2		4–1
Universitario	2–1	1–2	4–0	2–3	1–1	2–0	0–1	4–1	5–3	

Updated to match(es) played on 1952. Source: Diario El Comercio, La Prensa and Crónica.
Legend: Blue = home team win; Yellow = draw; Red = away team win.

== Top scorers ==
Rank	Player	Club	Goals
1	(Peru) Emilio Salinas	Alianza Lima	22
2	(Peru) Armando Reyes	Ciclista Lima	17
3	(Peru) Alberto Terry	Universitario	14
4	(Peru) Eugenio Zapata	Sporting Tabaco	13
4	(Peru) Manuel Rivera	Deportivo Municipal	13
5	(Peru) Óscar Gómez Sánchez	Alianza Lima	12

== See also ==
- 1952 Campeonato de Apertura
- 1952 Peruvian Segunda División
- 1952 Torneo Relámpago
