= 1950 Peruvian Primera División =

Campeonato de Selección y Competencia
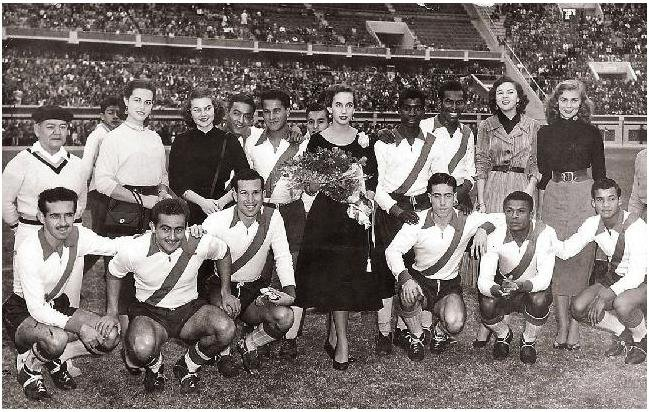
- Season: 1950
- Dates: 22 July 1950 – 3 December 1950
- Champions: Deportivo Municipal (4th title)
- Runner up: Sport Boys
- Relegated: Jorge Chávez
- Matches: 90
- Goals: 355 (3.94 per match)
- Top goalscorer: Alberto Terry (16 goals)

The 1950 season of the Peruvian Primera División, the top category of Peruvian football, was played by 10 teams. The national champions were Deportivo Municipal.

== Competition format ==
All teams faced each other in a double round-robin format, playing home and away matches. The team that accumulated the highest number of points at the end of the season was automatically crowned champion, while the team with the fewest points was relegated to the Peruvian Segunda División.

Two points were awarded for a win, one point for a draw, and no points for a loss.

== Teams ==
=== Team changes ===
Promoted from
1949 Segunda División
▲ Jorge Chávez (1st)
▲ Ciclista Lima (2nd)

=== Stadia locations ===
Team	City	Mannager
Alianza Lima	La Victoria, Lima	(Italy) Piado Petrovich
Atlético Chalaco	Callao	(Peru) Carlos Torres
Centro Iqueño	Cercado de Lima	(Peru) Juan Honores
Ciclista Lima	Cercado de Lima	(Peru) Carlos Iturrizaga
Deportivo Municipal	Cercado de Lima	(Peru) Juan Valdivieso
Jorge Chávez	Callao	(Peru) Enrique Aróstegui
Sport Boys	Callao	(Peru) Alfonso Huapaya
Sporting Tabaco	Rímac, Lima	(Peru) José Arana
Sucre	La Victoria, Lima	
Universitario	Cercado de Lima	(Peru) Arturo Fernández

== League table ==
=== Standings ===
Pos	Team	Pld	W	D	L	GF	GA	GD	Pts	Qualification or relegation
1	Deportivo Municipal (C)	18	12	2	4	46	30	+16	26	Champions
2	Sport Boys	18	12	1	5	36	23	+13	25	
3	Sporting Tabaco	18	8	5	5	45	37	+8	21	
4	Alianza Lima	18	9	2	7	42	32	+10	20	
5	Universitario	18	9	2	7	30	25	+5	20	
6	Atlético Chalaco	18	7	3	8	34	32	+2	17	
7	Centro Iqueño	18	6	5	7	33	39	−6	17	
8	Ciclista Lima	18	4	6	8	34	42	−8	14	
9	Sucre	18	4	4	10	36	48	−12	12	
10	Jorge Chávez (R)	18	4	0	14	21	49	−28	8	1951 Segunda División

(C) Champions; (R) Relegated

== Results ==
Home \ Away	ALI	CHA	IQU	CIC	MUN	JCC	SBA	TAB	SUC	UNI
Alianza Lima		5–3	2–2	2–4	1–1	6–0	2–1	4–2	3–0	2–1
Atlético Chalaco	1–0		2–0	3–2	1–2	2–1	2–3	1–2	1–1	0–2
Centro Iqueño	1–0	3–2		1–1	2–4	1–2	0–3	4–1	4–3	2–2
Ciclista Lima	3–1	2–5	2–2		1–3	2–1	0–0	1–1	3–4	1–1
Deportivo Municipal	3–0	1–0	3–4	6–1		8–2	1–3	2–2	2–1	W.O.
Jorge Chávez	1–2	1–3	2–0	2–1	1–2		2–0	0–5	1–3	0–2
Sport Boys	3–2	2–1	2–0	1–3	1–3	5–1		2–4	4–1	1–0
Sporting Tabaco	4–3	2–2	2–2	3–2	6–2	3–2	0–2		1–1	1–2
Sucre	1–4	2–2	3–5	2–2	1–3	3–2	1–2	5–2		2–4
Universitario	1–3	1–3	3–0	4–3	3–0	1–0	0–1	0–4	3–2	

Updated to match(es) played on 1950. Source: Diario El Comercio, La Prensa and Crónica.
Legend: Blue = home team win; Yellow = draw; Red = away team win.

== Torneo Equipos de Reserva ==
Alongside the Primera División championship, the Reserve Teams Tournament was played, featuring the reserve players of top-flight clubs. However, unlike the 1931–1934 period, this competition did not grant any bonus points to the first team.

=== Standings ===
Pos	Team	Pld	W	D	L	GF	GA	GD	Pts	Qualification or relegation
1	Centro Iqueño	9	8	0	1	19	8	+11	16	Champions
2	Atlético Chalaco	9	5	2	2	14	12	+2	12	
3	Sport Boys	9	3	5	1	18	9	+9	11	
4	Sporting Tabaco	9	4	3	2	19	13	+6	11	
5	Alianza Lima	9	4	2	3	11	12	−1	10	
6	Deportivo Municipal	9	3	3	3	11	12	−1	9	
7	Universitario	9	3	2	4	20	18	+2	8	
8	Ciclista Lima	9	2	4	3	12	11	+1	8	
9	Sucre	9	1	3	5	12	18	−6	5	
10	Jorge Chávez	9	0	0	9	4	27	−23	0	

== Top scorers ==
Rank	Player	Club	Goals
1	(Peru) Alberto Terry	Universitario	16
2	(Peru) Carlos Lazón	Sucre	14
3	(Peru) Manuel Rivera	Deportivo Municipal	13
4	(Peru) Víctor Pedraza	Alianza Lima	12
5	(Peru) Eugenio Zapata	Sporting Tabaco	11

== See also ==
- 1950 Campeonato de Apertura
- 1950 Peruvian Segunda División
- 1950 Torneo Relámpago
