= Juan Emilio Salinas =

Peruvian footballer (1925–2009)

Personal information
- Full name: Juan Emilio Salinas López
- Date of birth: 12 July 1925
- Place of birth: Lima, Peru
- Date of death: 18 September 2009 (aged 84)
- Place of death: Lima, Peru
- Position: Forward

Youth career
- Barrio Obrero

Senior career*
| Years | Team | Apps | (Gls) |
| 1948–1955 | Alianza Lima | 127 | (102) |
| 1955–1961 | Ciclista Lima | | |
| 1962 | Juventud Gloria | | |

International career
| 1949–1956 | Peru | 7 | (4) |
- * Club domestic league appearances and goals

Juan Emilio Salinas López (12 July 1925 – 18 September 2009) was a Peruvian professional footballer who played as forward.

== Biography ==
Nicknamed El feo (the ugly), Salinas began his career in 1948 with Alianza Lima, winning the league title in his first season. The following year, he became the league's top scorer with 18 goals. In 1952, he won both the league title and the top scorer award (22 goals). He added two more league titles in 1954 and 1955 before moving to Ciclista Lima, where he did not achieve the same level of success. He retired in 1962, playing in the second division for Juventud Gloria.

Salinas remains an important player for Alianza Lima. With 102 goals in 127 matches, he holds the club's best goals-per-game ratio (0.8). He is also the club's all-time leading scorer against their eternal rivals, Universitario de Deportes, with 18 goals. He distinguished himself against the latter on June 26, 1949, by scoring five of Alianza Lima's nine goals against their eternal rival (9–1 victory).

A seven-time Peruvian international between 1949 and 1956, Salinas was first called up for the 1949 South American Championship in Brazil, where he scored two goals. He was recalled seven years later to play in the 1956 Panamerican Championship in Mexico, where he again scored two goals.

== Honours ==
Alianza Lima

- Peruvian Primera División (4): 1948, 1952, 1954, 1955
- Peruvian Primera División Top scorer (2): 1949 (18 goals), 1952 (22)
