= 1933 Peruvian División Intermedia =

División Intermedia
- Season: 1933
- Champions: Unión Carbone
- Runner up: Sportivo Melgar
- Relegated: Unión Santa Catalina; Obrero Chorrillos; Juventud Chorrillos

The 1933 Peruvian División Intermedia, the second division of Peruvian football (soccer), was played by 18 teams. The tournament winner, Unión Carbone was promoted to the 1934 Peruvian Primera División.

- Hidroaviación disappeared after losing the support of the Escuela de Hidroaviación de Ancón.
- Lawn Tennis de la Exposición decided to disenroll from the Peruvian Football Federation.
- Juventud Chorrillos withdrew from the tournament after playing three matches.
- Peruvian Boys lost one match by walkover.

== Format ==
- From 1931 until 1934 the results of a reserve teams league were added as bonus points.
- From 1931 until 1942 the points system was W:3, D:2, L:1, walkover:0.

== Teams ==
=== Team changes ===
Promoted to 1933 Primera División	Promoted from 1932 Segunda División Provincial de Lima
▲ Sucre (1st) ▲ Sport Boys (2nd)	▲ Unión América (Zona Este - 1st) ▲ Sportivo Melgar (Zona Este - 2nd) ▲ Juventud Gloria (Zona Oeste - 1st) ▲ Peruvian Boys (Zona Rímac - 1st) ▲ Porvenir Miraflores (Zona Balnearios - 1st)

=== Stadia and locations ===
Team	City
Alianza Cóndor	La Victoria, Lima
Intelectual Raimondi	Cercado de Lima
Juventud Chorrillos	Chorrillos, Lima
Juventud Gloria	Cercado de Lima
Juventud Perú	Cercado de Lima
Juventud Soledad	Cercado de Lima
Miguel Grau	Rímac, Lima
Obrero Chorrillos	Chorrillos, Lima
Peruvian Boys	Cercado de Lima
Porvenir Miraflores	Miraflores, Lima
Sport Huáscar	Barranco, Lima
Sport Inca	Rímac, Lima
Sportivo Melgar	Barrios Altos
Sportivo Uruguay	Cercado de Lima
Unión América	Cercado de Lima
Unión Carbone	Barrios Altos
Unión Lazo	Cercado de Lima
Unión Santa Catalina	Cercado de Lima

== Torneo Primeros Equipos ==
=== Standings ===
Pos	Team	Pld	W	D	L	Pts
1	Unión Carbone	17	14	3	0	48
2	Sportivo Melgar	17	10	6	1	43
3	Juventud Gloria	17	9	3	5	38
4	Sport Inca	17	8	5	4	38
5	Intelectual Raymondi	17	9	2	6	37
6	Porvenir Miraflores	17	9	2	6	37
7	Unión Lazo	17	9	2	6	37
8	Sport Huáscar	17	8	3	6	36
9	Sportivo Uruguay	17	7	5	5	36
10	Alianza Cóndor	17	7	5	5	36
11	Juventud Soledad	17	8	2	7	35
12	Miguel Grau	17	3	9	5	32
13	Peruvian Boys	17	6	2	9	30
14	Unión América	17	3	7	7	30
15	Juventud Perú	17	3	6	8	29
16	Obrero Chorrillos	17	4	2	11	27
17	Unión Santa Catalina	17	2	4	11	25
18	Juventud Chorrillos	17	0	0	17	0

Source: Diario La Crónica 1933

== Tabla Absoluta ==
Pos	Team	Pld	W	D	L	Pts	Resv.	Total	Qualification or relegation
1	Unión Carbone (C)	17	14	3	0	48	10.5	58.5	1934 Primera División
2	Sportivo Melgar	17	10	6	1	43	11	54	
3	Juventud Gloria	17	9	3	5	38	10.5	48.5	
4	Sport Inca	17	8	5	4	38	10.5	48.5	
5	Intelectual Raymondi	17	9	2	6	37	8.75	45.75	
6	Sportivo Uruguay	17	7	5	5	36	9.75	45.75	
7	Porvenir Miraflores	17	9	2	6	37	8.25	45.25	
8	Unión Lazo	17	9	2	6	37	8	45	
9	Alianza Cóndor	17	7	5	5	36	8.75	44.75	
10	Sport Huáscar	17	8	3	6	36	6.75	42.75	
11	Juventud Soledad	17	8	2	7	35	7.25	42.25	
12	Miguel Grau	17	3	9	5	32	7.75	39.75	
13	Unión América	17	3	7	7	30	9	39	
14	Peruvian Boys	17	6	2	9	30	8.25	38.25	
15	Juventud Perú	17	3	6	8	29	9.25	38.25	
16	Unión Santa Catalina (R)	17	2	4	11	25	7.25	32.25	1934 Segunda División Provincial de Lima
17	Obrero Chorrillos (R)	17	4	2	11	27	3.5	30.5	1934 Segunda División Provincial de Lima
18	Juventud Chorrillos (R)	17	0	0	17	0	0	0	1934 Segunda División Provincial de Lima

== See also ==
- 1933 Peruvian Primera División
