= Carlos Lazón =

Peruvian footballer (1929–2013)

Personal information
- Full name: Carlos Lazón Quiñonez
- Date of birth: 5 October 1929
- Place of birth: Pisco, Peru
- Date of death: 25 March 2013 (aged 83)
- Position: Midfielder

Senior career*
Years	Team	Apps	(Gls)
1949–1951	Mariscal Sucre		
1952–1953	Huracán	32	(0)
1954–1957	Club Alianza Lima		
1958–1961	Sporting Cristal		
1962	Ciclista Lima		

International career
1952–1957	Peru	25	(0)
- * Club domestic league appearances and goals

Carlos Lazón Quiñonez (29 April 1930 – 25 March 2013) was a Peruvian professional footballer who played as midfielder.

== Playing career ==
=== Club career ===
Nicknamed El Polifuncional (the multifunctional), Carlos Lazón began his professional career with Mariscal Sucre in 1949. He moved to Argentina, joining Club Atlético Huracán, where he played 32 matches between 1952 and 1953.

He returned to Peru to play for Alianza Lima and won two consecutive Peruvian championships in 1954 and 1955. After moving to Sporting Cristal, he won a third championship in 1961. He ended his career in 1962 playing for Ciclista Lima.

=== International career ===
A Peruvian international, Carlos Lazón earned 25 caps between 1952 and 1957. He participated in three South American Championships in 1955, 1956 and 1957. He also played in two Panamerican Championships in 1952 and 1956.

== Honours ==
Alianza Lima

- Peruvian Primera División (2): 1954, 1955

Sporting Cristal

- Peruvian Primera División: 1961
