= 1948 Peruvian Primera División =

Peruvian Primera División
- Season: 1948
- Dates: 12 June 1948 – 16 January 1949
- Champions: Alianza Lima (8th title)
- Runner up: Atlético Chalaco
- Relegated: Ciclista Lima; Jorge Chávez (C)
- Matches: 108
- Goals: 435 (4.03 per match)
- Top goalscorer: Valeriano López (20 goals)

The 1948 season of the Peruvian Primera División, the top category of Peruvian football, was played by 9 teams. The national champions were Alianza Lima.

== Competition format ==
All teams faced each other in a triple round-robin format. The team that accumulated the highest number of points at the end of the season was automatically crowned champion, while the two teams with the fewest points were relegated to the Peruvian Segunda División.

Two points were awarded for a win, one point for a draw, and no points for a loss.

== Teams ==
=== Team changes ===
Promoted from
1947 Segunda División
▲ Jorge Chávez (1st)

=== Stadia locations ===
Team	City	Mannager
Alianza Lima	La Victoria, Lima	(Peru) Adelfo Magallanes
Atlético Chalaco	Callao	(Peru) Raúl Pardón
Ciclista Lima	Cercado de Lima	(Brazil) Boza
Deportivo Municipal	Cercado de Lima	(Peru) Juan Valdivieso
Jorge Chávez	Callao	(Peru) Mario Pacheco
Sport Boys	Callao	(Peru) José Arana
Sporting Tabaco	Rímac, Lima	(Hungary) Emérico Hirsch
Sucre	La Victoria, Lima	(Peru) Alfonso Huapaya
Universitario	Cercado de Lima	(Peru) Arturo Fernández

== League table ==
=== Standings ===
Pos	Team	Pld	W	D	L	GF	GA	GD	Pts	Qualification or relegation
1	Alianza Lima (C)	24	15	2	7	61	36	+25	32	Champions
2	Atlético Chalaco	24	13	5	6	63	46	+17	31	
3	Sporting Tabaco	24	11	7	6	47	34	+13	29	
4	Universitario	24	12	4	8	48	41	+7	28	
5	Sport Boys	24	9	7	8	62	54	+8	25	
6	Deportivo Municipal	24	9	4	11	37	46	−9	22	
7	Sucre	24	7	6	11	46	53	−7	20	
8	Ciclista Lima (R)	24	5	5	14	36	63	−27	15	1949 Segunda División
9	Jorge Chávez (R)	24	5	4	15	35	62	−27	14	1949 Segunda División

(C) Champions; (R) Relegated

== Results ==
=== Matches 1–16 ===
Home \ Away	ALI	CHA	CIC	MUN	JCC	SBA	TAB	SUC	UNI
Alianza Lima		3–2	4–0	1–2	0–2	3–0	1–2	4–4	2–3
Atlético Chalaco	3–5		5–1	2–1	1–1	3–1	3–3	6–2	1–1
Ciclista Lima	1–3	0–3		1–2	3–1	4–1	2–2	0–3	3–5
Deportivo Municipal	0–1	1–4	0–3		2–0	1–4	0–0	2–1	1–3
Jorge Chávez	0–2	1–3	4–6	1–6		2–8	3–1	4–2	0–1
Sport Boys	2–4	2–2	3–1	4–4	0–3		1–0	4–1	2–1
Sporting Tabaco	3–1	3–2	3–2	3–0	2–1	3–3		2–2	3–2
Sucre	1–2	1–2	1–1	0–0	4–1	3–7	3–1		0–2
Universitario	0–1	1–2	4–1	2–2	3–0	2–2	1–0	1–0	

Updated to match(es) played on 1948. Source: Diario El Comercio, La Prensa and Crónica.
Legend: Blue = home team win; Yellow = draw; Red = away team win.

=== Matches 17–24 ===
Home \ Away	ALI	CHA	CIC	MUN	JCC	SBA	TAB	SUC	UNI
Alianza Lima		2–3	4–1					3–1	5–2
Atlético Chalaco			2–3		2–1	5–4		1–4	
Ciclista Lima				0–2	1–4			1–1	0–0
Deportivo Municipal	2–1	1–3					1–3		4–3
Jorge Chávez	0–4			0–2			2–2	2–2	
Sport Boys	1–1		2–2	3–0	2–2				
Sporting Tabaco	1–4	0–0	4–0			2–0			
Sucre				3–1		4–3	1–0		2–3
Universitario		4–3			3–0	1–3	0–4		

Updated to match(es) played on 1948. Source: Diario El Comercio, La Prensa and Crónica.
Legend: Blue = home team win; Yellow = draw; Red = away team win.

== Torneo Equipos de Reserva ==
Alongside the Primera División championship, the Reserve Teams Tournament was played, featuring the reserve players of top-flight clubs. However, unlike the 1931–1934 period, this competition did not grant any bonus points to the first team.

=== Standings ===
Pos	Team	Pld	W	D	L	GF	GA	GD	Pts	Qualification or relegation
1	Alianza Lima	8	7	1	0	27	6	+21	15	Champions
2	Sport Boys	8	5	3	0	22	6	+16	13	
3	Universitario	8	4	1	3	19	17	+2	9	
4	Sucre	8	4	1	3	18	16	+2	9	
5	Deportivo Municipal	8	3	3	2	12	14	−2	9	
6	Atlético Chalaco	8	3	1	4	26	26	0	7	
7	Sporting Tabaco	8	1	2	5	14	20	−6	4	
8	Ciclista Lima	8	1	2	5	4	17	−13	4	
9	Jorge Chávez	8	0	2	6	11	31	−20	2	

=== Results ===
Home \ Away	ALI	CHA	CIC	MUN	JCC	SBA	TAB	SUC	UNI
Alianza Lima		11–1	W.O.					3–2	2–1
Atlético Chalaco			8–0		9–1	0–0		2–4	
Ciclista Lima				0–2	1–1			1–1	0–2
Deportivo Municipal	1–5	2–1			W.O.		2–2		2–2
Jorge Chávez	0–2						4–4	1–6	
Sport Boys	1–1		2–0	2–2	5–1				
Sporting Tabaco	0–3	2–3	1–2			1–3			
Sucre				2–1		0–5	2–1		1–2
Universitario		6–2			4–3	1–4	1–3		

Updated to match(es) played on 1948. Source: Diario El Comercio, La Prensa and Crónica.
Legend: Blue = home team win; Yellow = draw; Red = away team win.

== Top scorers ==
Rank	Player	Club	Goals
1	(Peru) Emilio Salinas	Alianza Lima	20
1	(Peru) Valeriano López	Sport Boys	20
2	(Peru) Vicente Villanueva	Sporting Tabaco	18
3	(Peru) Félix Castillo	Alianza Lima	16
4	(Peru) Ernesto Morales	Atlético Chalaco	15
5	(Peru) Jorge Alcalde	Universitario	13
5	(Peru) Félix Mina	Atlético Chalaco	13

== See also ==
- 1948 Campeonato de Apertura
- 1948 Peruvian Segunda División
- 1948 Torneo Relámpago
