= Guillermo Rivero =

Peruvian footballer and manager (1897–1950)

Personal information
- Date of birth: 1897
- Place of birth: Lima, Peru
- Date of death: April 1950 (aged 52–53)
- Place of death: La Oroya, Peru
- Position: Midfielder

Senior career*
Years	Team	Apps	(Gls)
1918–1921	Sport Alianza		
1926–1929	Alianza Lima		

Managerial career
- 1928–1934: Alianza Lima
- * Club domestic league appearances and goals

Guillermo Rivero (Lima, 1897 – La Oroya, 1950) was a Peruvian manager and former player.

== Playing career ==
Guillermo Rivero joined Alianza Lima, then called Sport Alianza, in December 1917. He won the Peruvian championship four times, achieving the double twice, first in 1918 and 1919 (finishing as top scorer each time) and then in 1927 and 1928. With 69 goals scored for the Blanquiazul club, he was one of its first idols.

== Managerial career ==
Player-coach when Alianza Lima won the 1928 championship, he won three more consecutive championships at the helm of the club in 1931, 1932 and 1933.

== Honours ==
=== Player ===
Alianza Lima

- Peruvian Primera División (4): 1918, 1919, 1928, 1929
- Peruvian Primera División Top scorer (2): 1918 (18 goals), 1919 (15 goals)

=== Manager ===
Alianza Lima

- Peruvian Primera División (4): 1928, 1931, 1932, 1933
