= 1935 Ligas Provinciales de Lima y Callao =

Ligas Provinciales de Lima y Callao
- Season: 1935
- Dates: 15 September 1935 – 15 November 1935
- Champions: Sporting Tabaco (Primera B); Atlético Chalaco (Callao)

The 1935 Ligas Provinciales de Lima y Callao, the second division of Peruvian football (soccer), was played by 11 teams (5 from the Liga Provincial de Lima (Primera B) and 6 from the Liga Provincial del Callao). The tournament winners, Atlético Chalaco and Sporting Tabaco was promoted to the 1937 Peruvian Primera División. From 1931 until 1942 the points system was W:3, D:2, L:1, walkover:0. In this season, the results of a reserve teams league were added as bonus points.

For this new championship some changes were made with respect to the previous tournament. To begin with, the participating teams were divided into two categories. Of the nine teams from the previous year, Alianza Lima, Universitario, Sucre, Sport Boys and Sportivo Tarapacá Ferrocarril remained in the main division, called Primera A, which ranked in the top five places. While Sporting Tabaco, Unión Carbone and Ciclista Lima became part of Primera B together with the Sport Progreso and Sportivo Melgar from the 1934 División Intermedia.

In 1936, No official tournament took place, because the Peru national football team competed at the 1936 Berlin Olympic Games and 1937 South American Championship. For this reason, the champions ascended to the 1937 Peruvian Primera División. However, these clubs participated in the 1936 Unofficial Peruvian Tournament, which was an amateur non official Tournament (“Division de Honor”) of Lima and Callao but organized by Peruvian Football Federation (FPF).

== Teams ==
=== Team changes ===
Promoted from 1934 División Intermedia (Lima)	Promoted from 1934 División Intermedia (Callao)	Relegated from 1934 Primera División
▲ Sport Progreso (1st) ▲ Sportivo Melgar (2nd)	▲ Porteño (1st)	▼ Sporting Tabaco (6th) ▼ Unión Carbone (7th) ▼ Ciclista Lima (8th) ▼ Circolo Sportivo Italiano (Disaffiliated)

=== Stadia and Locations ===
Team	City
Atlético Chalaco	Callao
Atlético Excelsior	Callao
Ciclista Lima	Cercado de Lima
Jorge Chávez	Callao
Porteño	Callao
Sport Progreso	Rímac, Lima
Sporting Tabaco	Rímac, Lima
Sportivo Melgar	Barrios Altos, Lima
Telmo Carbajo	Callao
Unión Buenos Aires	Callao
Unión Carbone	Barrios Altos, Lima

== Liga Provincial de Lima (Primera B) ==
=== Torneo Primeros Equipos ===
Pos	Team	Pld	W	D	L	GF	GA	GD	Pts	Promotion or relegation
1	Sporting Tabaco (C)	4	4	0	0	12	3	+9	12	1937 Primera División
2	Sport Progreso	4	3	0	1	10	10	0	10	1936 Primera División Unificada
3	Unión Carbone	4	1	0	3	9	10	−1	6	1936 Primera División Unificada
4	Sportivo Melgar	4	1	0	3	2	5	−3	6	1936 Primera División Unificada
5	Ciclista Lima	4	1	0	3	3	8	−5	6	1936 Primera División Unificada

(C) Champions

=== Results ===
Teams play each other once, either home or away. The matches were played only in Lima.

Home \ Away	CIC	PRO	TAB	MEL	CAR
Ciclista Lima		1–2		0–1	
Sport Progreso			2–5		5–4
Sporting Tabaco	4–0				2–1
Sportivo Melgar		0–1	0–1		
Unión Carbone	1–2			3–1	

Updated to match(es) played on 1935. Source: Diario El Comercio, La Prensa and Crónica.
Legend: Blue = home team win; Yellow = draw; Red = away team win.

== Liga Provincial del Callao ==
=== Torneo Primeros Equipos ===
Pos	Team	Pld	W	D	L	GF	GA	GD	Pts	Promotion or relegation
1	Atlético Chalaco	5	4	0	1	19	6	+13	13	Champions
2	Telmo Carbajo	5	4	0	1	11	7	+4	13	
3	Unión Buenos Aires	5	4	0	1	11	9	+2	13	
4	Jorge Chávez	5	1	1	3	9	9	0	8	
5	Porteño	5	1	1	3	7	14	−7	8	
6	Atlético Excelsior	5	0	0	5	4	16	−12	5	

==== Results ====
Teams play each other once, either home or away. The matches were played only in Callao.

Home \ Away	CHA	EXC	JCH	POR	TEL	UBA
Atlético Chalaco		4–1	4–0	7–2		
Atlético Excelsior			0–4		1–3	
Jorge Chávez				1–1	2–3	
Porteño		1–0				1–3
Telmo Carbajo	0–2			3–2		2–0
Unión Buenos Aires	3–2	4–2	2–0			

Updated to match(es) played on 1935. Source: Diario El Comercio, La Prensa and Crónica.
Legend: Blue = home team win; Yellow = draw; Red = away team win.

=== Torneo Equipos de Reserva ===
Pos	Team	Pld	W	D	L	GF	GA	GD	Pts	Promotion or relegation
1	Jorge Chávez	5	4	0	1	7	3	+4	13	Champions
2	Atlético Excelsior	5	2	2	1	10	5	+5	11	
3	Atlético Chalaco (Note: Atlético Chalaco were deducted one point for walkover.)	5	2	2	1	4	0	+4	10	
4	Porteño	5	1	2	2	5	7	−2	9	
5	Telmo Carbajo	5	1	2	2	7	10	−3	9	
6	Unión Buenos Aires (Note: Unión Buenos Aires were deducted one point for walkover.)	5	1	0	4	1	9	−8	6	

==== Results ====
Teams play each other once, either home or away. The matches were played only in Callao.

Home \ Away	CHA	EXC	JCH	POR	TEL	UBA
Atlético Chalaco			1–0		0–0	
Atlético Excelsior	0–0				6–1	
Jorge Chávez		3–1		2–1		W.O.
Porteño	0–3	1–1				
Telmo Carbajo			0–2	1–1		5–1
Unión Buenos Aires	W.O.	0–2		0–2		

Updated to match(es) played on 1935. Source: Diario El Comercio, La Prensa and Crónica.
Legend: Blue = home team win; Yellow = draw; Red = away team win.

=== Tabla Absoluta ===
Pos	Team	Pld	W	D	L	GF	GA	GD	Pts	Resv.	Total	Qualification or relegation
1	Atlético Chalaco (C)	5	4	0	1	19	6	+12	13	2.5	15.5	1937 Primera División
2	Telmo Carbajo	5	4	0	1	11	7	+4	13	2.25	15.25	1937 Primera División
3	Unión Buenos Aires	5	4	0	1	11	9	+2	13	1.5	14.5	1936 Primera División Unificada
4	Jorge Chávez	5	1	1	3	9	9	0	8	3.25	11.25	1936 Primera División Unificada
5	Porteño	5	1	1	3	7	14	−7	8	2.25	10.25	1936 Primera División Unificada
6	Atlético Excelsior	5	0	0	5	4	16	−12	5	2.75	7.75	1936 Primera División Unificada

== See also ==
- 1935 Peruvian Primera División
