= 1949 Peruvian Segunda División =

Division of Peruvian football

Peruvian Segunda División
- Season: 1949
- Dates: 5 October 1949 – 29 January 1950
- Champions: Jorge Chávez
- Runner up: Ciclista Lima
- Matches: 56
- Goals: 228 (4.07 per match)

The 1948 Peruvian Segunda División, the second division of Peruvian football (soccer), was played by 8 teams. The tournament winners, Jorge Chávez and Ciclista Lima were promoted to the 1950 Peruvian Primera División.

== Competition format ==
All teams faced each other in a double round-robin format, playing home and away matches. The team that accumulated the highest number of points at the end of the season was automatically crowned champion and promoted to the Peruvian Primera División, as was the runner-up.

== Teams ==
=== Team changes ===
Promoted to 1949 Primera División	Relegated from 1948 Primera División
▲ Centro Iqueño (1st)	▼ Ciclista Lima (8th) ▼ Jorge Chávez (9th)

=== Stadia and locations ===
Team	City
Association Chorrillos	Chorrillos, Lima
Atlético Lusitania	Cercado de Lima
Carlos Concha	Callao
Ciclista Lima	Cercado de Lima
Defensor Arica	Breña, Lima
Jorge Chávez	Callao
Santiago Barranco	Barranco, Lima
Unión Callao	Callao

== League table ==
=== Standings ===
Pos	Team	Pld	W	D	L	GF	GA	GD	Pts	Qualification or relegation
1	Jorge Chávez (C)	14	9	4	1	41	15	+26	22	1950 Primera División
2	Ciclista Lima	14	8	4	2	42	29	+13	20	1950 Primera División
3	Unión Callao	14	6	4	4	28	25	+3	16	
4	Association Chorrillos	14	4	4	6	32	38	−6	12	
5	Defensor Arica	14	4	3	7	22	25	−3	11	
6	Carlos Concha	14	3	5	6	24	42	−18	11	
7	Santiago Barranco	14	3	4	7	18	25	−7	10	
8	Atlético Lusitania	14	2	6	6	21	29	−8	10	

(C) Champions

== Results ==
Home \ Away	ACH	LUS	CON	CIC	DAR	JCC	SAN	UNI
Association Chorrillos		6–5	4–4	6–2	1–1	1–1	2–1	4–2
Atlético Lusitania	4–2		2–1	2–2	0–0	0–5	2–2	1–1
Carlos Concha	2–2	2–1		2–8	3–2	0–0	2–2	0–0
Ciclista Lima	2–1	2–2	6–2		2–2	2–5	1–1	4–3
Defensor Arica	2–1	2–0	7–0	0–4		0–5	4–1	2–3
Jorge Chávez	3–1	2–1	5–2	2–3	2–0		1–1	6–2
Santiago Barranco	4–1	1–0	1–3	1–3	1–0	0–2		1–2
Unión Callao	5–0	1–1	2–1	1–2	2–0	2–2	2–1	

Updated to match(es) played on 1949. Source: Diario El Comercio, La Prensa and Crónica.
Legend: Blue = home team win; Yellow = draw; Red = away team win.

== See also ==
- 1949 Peruvian Primera División
