= Miguel Mostto =

Peruvian footballer (born 1977)

Personal information
- Full name: Miguel Ángel Mostto Fernández-Prada
- Date of birth: 11 November 1977 (age 49)
- Place of birth: Ica, Peru
- Height: 1.78 m (5 ft 10 in)
- Position: Striker

Senior career*
| Years | Team | Apps | (Gls) |
| 2000 | Coronel Bolognesi | 14 | (10) |
| 2001 | Deportivo Bolito | 5 | (1) |
| 2002–2003 | Coronel Bolognesi | 79 | (26) |
| 2004–2007 | Cienciano | 134 | (59) |
| 2007–2009 | Barnsley | 23 | (2) |
| 2008 | → Coronel Bolognesi (loan) | 9 | (2) |
| 2009 | Total Chalaco | 13 | (3) |
| 2009 | Coronel Bolognesi | 7 | (0) |
| 2010–2011 | Sport Huancayo | 39 | (14) |
| 2012 | Cienciano | 19 | (9) |
| 2012–2013 | Alianza Lima | 21 | (4) |
| 2014 | Univ. Técnica de Cajamarca | 10 | (2) |
| 2014 | Defensor San Alejandro | 6 | (2) |
| 2015 | San Simón | 10 | (4) |
| Total | | 365 | (124) |

International career
| 2003–2007 | Peru | 12 | (1) |
- * Club domestic league appearances and goals

Miguel Ángel Mostto Fernández-Prada, or Miguel Mostto (born 11 November 1977) is a Peruvian former professional footballer who played as a striker.

== Club career ==
Mostto was born in Ica, Peru. He was signed by Barnsley on a two-year deal from Cienciano for a fee thought to be in the region of £350,000 to £400,000, the largest transfer fee paid by Barnsley since signing Neil Shipperley in 1999. He scored his first goal for Barnsley in a friendly with Barnsley winning 3–1 over Buxton. His first league goal came in a 1–1 home draw against Burnley.

On 12 February 2008, Mostto left for his homeland to join up with former club Coronel Bolognesi on loan, but returned to Oakwell in time for the start of the 2008–09 Football League Championship season.

Mostto left Barnsley in October to return home to tend to his ill son. Reds boss Simon Davey granted the Peruvian indefinite leave to be with him.

Mostto bagged his second goal in Barnsley colours in the 2–1 win over Watford with a neat finish which would tie the game at 1–1 before Stephen Foster's winner. He then left Barnsley to return to Peru with Total Chalaco on 7 January 2009 for an undisclosed fee.

== International career ==
Mostto was called up to the provisional Peru national team squad for Copa América 2007, but he was forced to pull out of the squad due to his transfer to Barnsley.

== Honours ==
Cienciano

- Recopa Sudamericana: 2004
- Torneo Apertura: 2005
- Torneo Clausura: 2006
