= 1935 Peruvian Primera División =

Peruvian Primera División
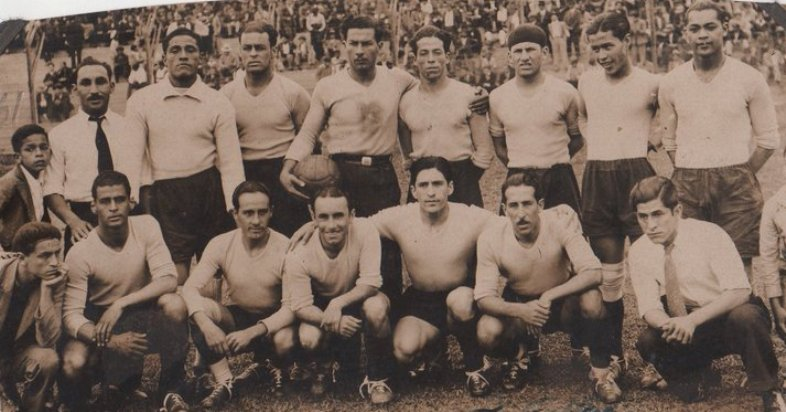
- Sport Boys, champion
- Season: 1935
- Dates: 15 September 1935 – 3 November 1935
- Champions: Sport Boys (1st title)
- Runner up: Alianza Lima
- Relegated: none
- Matches: 6
- Goals: 25 (4.17 per match)
- Top goalscorer: Jorge Alcalde (5 goals)

The 1935 season of the Peruvian Primera División (Primera A) was the 20th season of top-flight Peruvian football. A total of 5 teams competed in this league. The national champions were Sport Boys. Matches were not completed; Sport Boys was declared champion, as no team could reach them. No team was relegated as First Division grew to 10 teams. From 1931 until 1942 the points system was W:3, D:2, L:1, walkover:0.

For this new championship some changes were made with respect to the previous tournament. To begin with, the participating teams were divided into two categories. Of the nine teams from the previous year, Alianza Lima, Universitario, Sucre, Sport Boys and Sportivo Tarapacá Ferrocarril remained in the main division, called Primera A, which ranked in the top five places. While Sporting Tabaco, Unión Carbone and Ciclista Lima became part of Primera B together with the Sport Progreso and Sportivo Melgar from the 1934 División Intermedia.

The entire tournament was held at the Estadio Nacional.

== Teams ==
=== Team changes ===
Relegated from
1934 Primera División
▼ Sporting Tabaco (6th)
▼ Unión Carbone (7th)
▼ Ciclista Lima (8th)

=== Stadia and Locations ===
Team	City
Alianza Lima	La Victoria, Lima
Sport Boys	Callao
Sportivo Tarapacá Ferrocarril	Cercado de Lima
Sucre	La Victoria, Lima
Universitario	Cercado de Lima

== Primera A ==
=== Standings ===
Pos	Team	Pld	W	D	L	GF	GA	GD	Pts	Qualification or relegation
1	Sport Boys (C)	4	4	0	0	13	6	+7	12	Champions
2	Alianza Lima	2	1	0	1	5	2	+3	4	
3	Universitario	2	0	1	1	3	4	−1	3	
4	Sportivo Tarapacá Ferrocarril	2	0	1	1	3	6	−3	3	
5	Sucre	2	0	0	2	1	7	−6	2	

(C) Champions

== Results ==
Teams play each other once, either home or away. The matches were played only in Lima.

Home \ Away	ALI	SBA	TAR	SUC	UNI
Alianza Lima				4–0	n.p.
Sport Boys	2–1				3–2
Sportivo Tarapacá Ferrocarril	n.p.	2–5			
Sucre		1–3	n.p.		
Universitario			1–1	n.p.	

Updated to match(es) played on 1935. Source: Diario El Comercio, La Prensa and Crónica.
Legend: Blue = home team win; Yellow = draw; Red = away team win.

=== Round 1 ===
15 September 1935	Sport Boys	2–1	Alianza Lima	Estadio Nacional, Lima
15:45	Teodoro Alcalde 7' (pen.); Alberto Baldovino 25'		Alejandro Villanueva 2'	Referee: Arnold Rottman

22 September 1935	Universitario	1–1	Sportivo Tarapacá Ferrocarril	Estadio Nacional, Lima
15:45	Teodoro Fernández		Luis Quiles

=== Round 2 ===
29 September 1935	Sport Boys	5–2	Sportivo Tarapacá Ferrocarril	Estadio Nacional, Lima
15:45	Alberto Baldovino 27'; Enrique Aróstegui 30'; Jorge Alcalde 60' 90'		Luis Quiles; Isaac Pedraza	Referee: Miguel Serra Hurtado

3 November 1935	Alianza Lima	4–0	Sucre	Estadio Nacional, Lima
	Alejandro Villanueva; Juan Puente; Leopoldo Quiñonez

=== Round 3 ===
6 October 1935	Sport Boys	3–2	Universitario	Estadio Nacional, Lima
15:45	Jorge Alcalde 13' 30'; Teodoro Alcalde 72' (pen.)		Teodoro Fernández 39'; Carlos Tovar 81'	Referee: Miguel Serra Hurtado

10 November 1935	Sucre	not played	Sportivo Tarapacá Ferrocarril	Estadio Nacional, Lima

=== Round 4 ===
13 October 1935	Universitario	not played	Sucre	Estadio Nacional, Lima

13 October 1935	Sportivo Tarapacá Ferrocarril	not played	Alianza Lima	Estadio Nacional, Lima

=== Round 5 ===
20 October 1935	Sport Boys	3–1	Sucre	Estadio Nacional, Lima
15:50	Teodoro Alcalde 59'; Aquiles Westres 74' 77'		Alejandro Lavalle 23'	Referee: Jesús Mora

27 October 1935	Alianza Lima	not played	Universitario	Estadio Nacional, Lima

== Top scorers ==
Rank	Player	Club	Goals
1	(Peru) Jorge Alcalde	Sport Boys	5
2	(Peru) Teodoro Alcalde	Sport Boys	3
3	(Peru) Alejandro Villanueva	Alianza Lima	2
3	(Peru) Juan Puente	Alianza Lima	2
3	(Peru) Alberto Baldovino	Sport Boys	2
3	(Peru) Aquiles Westres	Sport Boys	2
3	(Peru) Teodoro Fernández	Universitario	2
3	(Peru) Luis Quiles	Sportivo Tarapacá Ferrocarril	2
4	(Peru) Leopoldo Quiñonez	Alianza Lima	1
4	(Peru) Enrique Aróstegui	Sport Boys	1
4	(Peru) Carlos Tovar	Universitario	1
4	(Peru) Alejandro Lavalle	Sucre	1
4	(Peru) Isaac Pedraza	Sportivo Tarapacá Ferrocarril	1

== See also ==
- 1935 Ligas Provinciales de Lima y Callao
