= 2006 FBC Melgar season =

FBC Melgar
2006 season
- Stadium: Estadio Melgar
- Torneo Descentralizado: Torneo Apertura: Eleventh (11°); Torneo Clausura: Seventh (7°); Aggregate Table: Seventh (7°); Seventh National (7°)
Home colours	Away colours	Third colours

The 2006 FBC Melgar season were the Ninety-Second (92.º) of the club from its foundation in 1915, Thirty-Seven (37) participations in the top-flight of Peruvian Primera División (of 90 Editions) with denomination Torneo Descentralizado. In Previous Season the club qualified as 9th Place of the 2005 Torneo Descentralizado.

Melgar were a of twelve (12) clubs in the Forty-First edition (41.º) Torneo Descentralizado, the competition most important of the Peruvian football. The club played the Peruvian Primera División.

== Torneo Descentralizado ==
=== Torneo Apertura ===
Pos	Team	Pld	W	D	L	GF	GA	GD	Pts
10	José Gálvez	22	6	4	12	20	30	-10	22
11	Melgar	22	5	7	10	20	32	-12	22
12	Sport Boys	22	3	6	13	17	34	-17	15

== See also ==
- FBC Melgar
- 2006 Torneo Descentralizado
