= Faustino Delgado =

Peruvian footballer (1921–2004)

Personal information
- Full name: Faustino Delgado Olabarrera
- Date of birth: 15 February 1921
- Place of birth: Mollendo, Peru
- Date of death: 31 October 2004 (aged 83)
- Place of death: Peru
- Position: Forward

Senior career*
Years	Team	Apps	(Gls)
1941–1955	Sporting Tabaco		
1956–1963	Sporting Cristal		

International career
1957–1961	Peru	3	(0)
- * Club domestic league appearances and goals

Faustino Delgado Olabarrera (15 February 1921 – 31 October 2004) was a Peruvian footballer who played as a forward for Sporting Tabaco and the Peruvian national team between 1945 and 1963. He spent his entire 18-year career at Tabaco (later renamed Sporting Cristal), thus being part of the one-club men group.

== Club career ==
Born in Mollendo on 15 February 1921, Delgado moved to Lima to complete his mandatory military service. Whilst in the Peruvian capital, he joined the ranks of Sporting Tabaco in 1945, aged 24, making his official debut for the club on 20 July 1946, in a 6–1 loss to Deportivo Municipal. Delgado scored his first goal for the club in his second appearance, a 1–4 loss to Club Universitario. A few weeks later, he achieved his first official victory for the club after scoring the final goal of an epic 6–5 win over Deportivo Municipal. He thus slowly established himself as an undisputed starter in the club's forward line, which also included Edgardo Mabama and Vicente Villanueva.

Delgado stayed at the club until 1956, when it was renamed as Sporting Cristal, scoring a goal in its first-ever match on 24 May 1956, a 2–1 friendly win over Sport Boys. Together with Máximo Mosquera, Antonio Sacco, and Carlos Zunino, he was a member of the Cristal team that won the Peruvian Primera División at the first time of asking (1956), claiming the title on the final matchday against Carlos Concha, scoring twice in a 4–0 win to finish the season as the league's top scorer with 11 goals. On 18 February 1960, he scored against Pelé's Santos in the club third-ever international match, which ended in a 3–3 draw. The following year, in 1961, Delgado helped Cristal win the championship again, which qualified the club for the 1962 Copa Libertadores, in which he helped his team to a 2–1 victory over Argentine club Racing Club on 20 February, becoming, at the age of 41 years and 5 days, the oldest player in the then short history of the Copa Libertadores. He retired the following year.

== International career ==
On 9 April 1957, just three days after the end of the 1957 South American Championship, Delgado made his international debut for Peru in a friendly match against Argentina, being replaced by Juan Joya in the second half in an eventual 1–4 loss.

Delgado earned his final two caps for Peru in a two-legged 1962 World Cup qualifier against Colombia in April and May 1961, scoring a first-half penalty in a 1–1 draw that eliminated Peru from the World Cup. In doing so at the age of 40 years and 81 days, he became the oldest goalscorer in the history of the Peruvian national team, the oldest goalscorer in CONMEBOL, and the oldest goalscorer in a World Cup South American qualifier, three records that he held for over 60 years, until they were finally broken in 2024 and 2025 by Paolo Guerrero.

== Death ==
Delgado died on 31 October 2004, at the age of 83.

== Honours ==
Deportivo Municipal

- Sporting Cristal: 1956, 1961
