= Alberto Loret de Mola =

Peruvian footballer (1928–2005)

Personal information
- Full name: Alberto Loret de Mola Saldamando
- Date of birth: 13 January 1928
- Place of birth: Lima, Peru
- Date of death: 24 August 2005 (aged 77)
- Place of death: Lima, Peru
- Height: 1.74 m (5 ft 9 in)
- Position: Midfielder

Senior career*
Years	Team	Apps	(Gls)
1947	Centro Iqueño		
1948–1949	Deportivo Municipal		
1950	Universidad de Bogotá		
1951	Huracán de Medellín		
1952–1953	Huracán		
1954	Centro Iqueño		
1955–1956	Universitario		
1956–1957	Atlas F.C.		
1957–1958	Sporting Cristal		
1958–1960	UD Las Palmas	31	(6)
1961–1963	Le Havre AC	57	(14)
1963–1965	Porvenir Miraflores		

International career
1955–1956	Peru	7	(0)
- * Club domestic league appearances and goals

Alberto Loret de Mola Saldamando (13 January 1928 – 24 August 2005) was a Peruvian professional footballer who played as midfielder.

== Playing career ==
=== Club career ===
Loret de Mola began his career in 1947 with Centro Iqueño before moving to Deportivo Municipal the following year. In 1950, he emigrated to Colombia and played for two now-defunct clubs: Universidad de Bogotá and Huracán de Medellín.

In 1952, he continued his professional career in Argentina with CA Huracán. He returned to Peru with a certain renown and rejoined the club where he had started, Centro Iqueño. His strong performances earned him opportunities to play for more prestigious clubs such as Universitario de Deportes and Sporting Cristal.

In the late 1950s, Loret de Mola tried his luck in Europe, first in Spain with UD Las Palmas, and became the first Peruvian player to play in La Liga. He played 31 matches in the Spanish First Division. He then moved to France, joining Le Havre AC, a club with which he was relegated in 1962.

He finished his playing career in the Peruvian second division, with Porvenir Miraflores.

=== International career ===
Loret de Mola was called up to the Peruvian national team to participate in the 1955 and 1956 South American Championships. He played seven matches in total (scoring no goals).
