= 1934 Peruvian Primera División =

Peruvian Primera División
- Season: 1934
- Dates: 16 September 1934 – 7 July 1935
- Champions: Universitario (2nd title)
- Runner up: Alianza Lima
- Relegated: Sporting Tabaco; Unión Carbone; Ciclista Lima; Circolo Sportivo Italiano
- Matches: 37
- Goals: 104 (2.81 per match)
- Top goalscorer: Teodoro Fernández (9 goals)

The 1934 season of the Peruvian Primera División was the 19th season of top-flight Peruvian football. A total of 9 teams competed in this league.

The champion of this tournament was Universitario de Deportes. The season's top scorers were Teodoro Fernández and Jorge "Campolo" Alcalde, both with 10 goals. In this way "Lolo" Fernández managed to be the top scorer in the Peruvian First Division for the first time for three consecutive years, a record he holds together with Valeriano López.

There is controversy about this championship regarding the team that should have been awarded the title. Some argue that the champion should have been Alianza Lima, while others argue that the title belong to Universitario de Deportes.

The controversy arose when Alianza Lima managed to beat Universitario de Deportes on the last date by a quarter of a point, thanks to the bonus granted by the Reserves Tournament that was played at that time in parallel to the First Teams Tournament. Universitario's directors challenged the result, as they considered it unfair to lose the championship by a quarter of a point from a secondary tournament (Reserves Tournament). Even though this was the format for the previous 4 years, and every team was in accordance. The Peruvian sports authorities, taking advantage of the fact that a congress of the South American Football Confederation was being held in Lima, presented the case to some of their delegates, who thought that a title should not be defined by such a narrow margin, and that it would be best to declare it tied. Consequently, the sports authorities ordered an extra match to be played.

The question arises as to the nature of this extra match. The Club Universitario de Deportes maintains that the authorities would have declared the tournament tied, and thus the extra match, in which they were victorious, would have given them the Absolute Title. For its part, Club Alianza Lima claims that Universitario's claims were not upheld, so the extra match would never have defined the main title but a secondary one. In 2013, Alianza Lima sent a formal claim to the Peruvian Football Federation to rectify the list of winners, but so far the entity has not issued any statement yet.

Alianza Lima still claims to be the champion, and today there is an ongoing effort by its supporters to get the title recognized to Alianza Lima, according to their own recent investigations and the official resolutions that were published on the newspapers of the time. However, the Peruvian Football Federation and the Sports Association of Professional Football, both recognize the title of this year belong to Universitario. Furthermore, in 2012 the FIFA published an article in which Universitario appears holding the 1934 championship and in 2023 reaffirmed that status.

Circolo Sportivo Italiano disbanded after 3 matches. Hence, their 5 remaining matches were awarded to their opponents, Circolo gaining 0 pts. No team was promoted and First Division was reduced to 5 teams for 1935.

== Format ==
- From 1931 until 1934 the results of a reserve teams league were added as bonus points.
- From 1931 until 1942 the points system was W:3, D:2, L:1, walkover:0.

== Teams ==
=== Team changes ===
Promoted from 1933 División Intermedia	Relegated from 1933 Primera División
▲ Unión Carbone (1st)	▼ Sport Progreso (9th) ▼ Sportivo Unión (10th)

=== Stadia and Locations ===
Team	City
Alianza Lima	La Victoria, Lima
Ciclista Lima	Cercado de Lima
Circolo Sportivo Italiano	Pueblo Libre, Lima
Sport Boys	Callao
Sporting Tabaco	Rímac, Lima
Sportivo Tarapacá Ferrocarril	Cercado de Lima
Sucre	La Victoria, Lima
Universitario	Cercado de Lima
Unión Carbone	Barrios Altos

== Torneo Primeros Equipos ==
=== Standings ===
Pos	Team	Pld	W	D	L	GF	GA	GD	Pts	Qualification
1	Alianza Lima	8	6	1	1	14	6	+8	21	Primeros Equipos play-off
2	Universitario	8	6	1	1	14	8	+6	21	Primeros Equipos play-off
3	Sport Boys	8	4	3	1	17	8	+9	19	
4	Sucre	8	5	1	2	16	10	+6	19	
5	Sportivo Tarapacá Ferrocarril	8	3	3	2	11	7	+4	17	
6	Sporting Tabaco	8	3	2	3	13	14	−1	16	
7	Ciclista Lima	8	1	1	6	6	20	−14	11	
8	Unión Carbone	8	1	1	6	5	21	−16	11	
9	Circolo Sportivo Italiano (Note: Circolo Sportivo Italiano were deducted five points for walkovers.)	8	0	1	7	5	7	−2	4	Disaffiliated

==== Torneo Primeros Equipos play-off ====
7 July 1935
16:25 UTC−5

Universitario	2–1	Alianza Lima
Vicente Arce 53'; Teodoro Fernández 61'		José María Lavalle 26'

Estadio Nacional, Lima
Referee: (Austria) Arnold Rottman

=== Results ===
Teams play each other once, either home or away. All matches were played in Lima.

Home \ Away	ALI	CIC	CSI	SBA	TAB	SUC	TAR	CAR	UNI
Alianza Lima		3–0	W.O.		2–1	2–0	0–0		2–1
Ciclista Lima					1–2		0–7	1–1	
Circolo Sportivo Italiano		1–2							
Sport Boys	4–1	3–0	W.O.				1–1	5–1	
Sporting Tabaco			3–3	2–1		1–4			2–2
Sucre		2–1	2–1	2–2					
Sportivo Tarapacá Ferrocarril			W.O.		0–0	1–4		2–1	
Unión Carbone	0–4		W.O.		1–2	0–1			
Universitario		W.O.	W.O.	1–1		2–1	1–0	6–1	

Updated to match(es) played on 1934. Source: Diario El Comercio, La Prensa and Crónica.
Legend: Blue = home team win; Yellow = draw; Red = away team win.

== Torneo Equipos de Reserva ==
=== Standings ===
Pos	Team	Pld	W	D	L	Pts	Qualification
1	Alianza Lima	8	7	1	0	23	Champions
2	Universitario	8	7	0	1	22	
3	Sportivo Tarapacá Ferrocarril	8	4	1	3	17	
4	Sporting Tabaco	8	3	3	2	17	
5	Sucre	8	3	1	4	15	
6	Unión Carbone	8	2	1	5	13	
7	Sport Boys	8	1	2	5	12	
8	Ciclista Lima (Note: Ciclista Lima were deducted two points for walkovers.)	8	2	2	4	12	
9	Circolo Sportivo Italiano (Note: Circolo Sportivo Italiano were deducted five points for walkovers.)	8	1	1	6	6	Disaffiliated

== Tabla Absoluta ==
Pos	Team	Pld	W	D	L	GF	GA	GD	Pts	Resv.	Total	Qualification or relegation
1	Alianza Lima	8	6	1	1	14	6	+8	21	5.75	26.75	
2	Universitario (C)	8	6	1	1	14	8	+6	21	5.5	26.5	Champion
3	Sucre	8	5	1	2	16	10	+6	19	3.75	22.75	
4	Sport Boys	8	4	3	1	17	8	+9	19	3	22	
5	Sportivo Tarapacá Ferrocarril	8	3	3	2	11	7	+4	17	4.75	21.75	
6	Sporting Tabaco (R)	8	3	2	3	13	14	−1	16	4.25	20.25	1935 Primera B
7	Unión Carbone (R)	8	1	1	6	5	21	−16	11	3.25	14.25	1935 Primera B
8	Ciclista Lima (R)	8	1	1	6	6	20	−14	11	3	14	1935 Primera B
9	Circolo Sportivo Italiano (D)	8	0	1	7	5	7	−2	4	1.5	5.5	Disaffiliated

- (*) Despite the controversy over this championship, the FPF and the ADFP consider Universitario the champion.

== See also ==
- 1934 Liga Provincial del Callao
