= 1954 Peruvian Primera División =

Peruvian Primera División
- Season: 1954
- Dates: 29 June 1954 – 10 January 1955
- Champions: Alianza Lima (10th title)
- Runner up: Sporting Tabaco
- Relegated: Carlos Concha
- Matches: 90
- Goals: 304 (3.38 per match)
- Top goalscorer: Vicente Villanueva (14 goals)

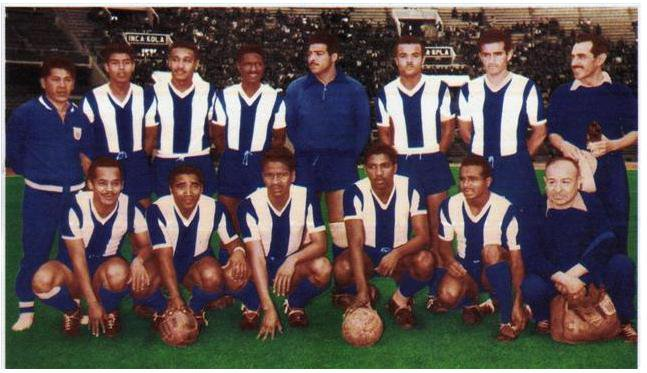
Alianza Lima team photo

The 1954 season of the Peruvian Primera División, the top category of Peruvian football, was played by 10 teams. The national champions were Alianza Lima.

== Competition format ==
All teams faced each other in a double round-robin format, playing home and away matches. The team that accumulated the highest number of points at the end of the season was automatically crowned champion, while the team with the fewest points was relegated to the Peruvian Segunda División.

Two points were awarded for a win, one point for a draw, and no points for a loss.

== Teams ==
=== Team changes ===
Promoted from 1953 Segunda División	Relegated from 1953 Primera División
▲ Carlos Concha (1st)	▼ Unión Callao (10th)

=== Stadia locations ===
Team	City	Mannager
Alianza Lima	La Victoria, Lima	(Peru) Adelfo Magallanes
Atlético Chalaco	Callao	(Argentina) Francisco Villegas
Carlos Concha	Callao	(Peru) Germán Cáceres
Centro Iqueño	Cercado de Lima	(Uruguay) Roberto Scarone
Ciclista Lima	Cercado de Lima	(Argentina) Ángel Fernández Roca
Deportivo Municipal	Cercado de Lima	(Peru) Segundo Castillo
Mariscal Sucre	La Victoria, Lima	(Peru) Carlos Iturrizaga
Sport Boys	Callao	(Peru) Alfonso Huapaya
Sporting Tabaco	Rímac, Lima	(Argentina) César Viccino
Universitario	Breña, Lima	(Peru) Arturo Fernández

== League table ==
=== Standings ===
Pos	Team	Pld	W	D	L	GF	GA	GD	Pts	Qualification or relegation
1	Alianza Lima (C)	18	12	3	3	45	27	+18	27	Champions
2	Sporting Tabaco	18	11	2	5	41	32	+9	24	
3	Universitario	18	9	3	6	38	26	+12	21	
4	Centro Iqueño	18	7	6	5	25	22	+3	20	
5	Ciclista Lima	18	9	1	8	26	24	+2	19	
6	Atlético Chalaco	18	6	5	7	36	31	+5	17	
7	Sport Boys	18	5	6	7	22	29	−7	16	
8	Deportivo Municipal	18	6	3	9	27	33	−6	15	
9	Mariscal Sucre	18	5	2	11	26	33	−7	12	
10	Carlos Concha (R)	18	3	3	12	18	47	−29	9	1955 Segunda División

(C) Champions; (R) Relegated

== Results ==
Home \ Away	ALI	CHA	CAR	IQU	CIC	MUN	SUC	SBA	TAB	UNI
Alianza Lima		4–2	4–0	1–1	2–1	1–0	1–0	2–2	4–3	3–2
Atlético Chalaco	1–3		6–1	2–0	1–0	1–1	4–1	4–2	4–2	1–2
Carlos Concha	2–4	0–0		0–3	2–0	2–1	1–2	1–1	1–6	1–5
Centro Iqueño	2–1	3–2	2–1		3–1	3–3	1–1	0–0	0–2	1–1
Ciclista Lima	2–1	3–1	2–1	1–0		3–1	2–0	0–1	0–4	2–1
Deportivo Municipal	1–3	2–1	1–0	3–2	2–2		2–1	1–2	0–3	0–2
Mariscal Sucre	1–4	1–1	3–0	1–2	0–3	1–3		1–2	3–0	1–3
Sport Boys	2–3	1–1	0–2	0–0	2–0	1–5	2–4		2–2	1–2
Sporting Tabaco	2–1	2–1	3–3	1–0	0–3	3–1	1–5	1–0		2–1
Universitario	3–3	3–3	4–0	1–2	2–1	2–0	1–0	0–1	3–4	

Updated to match(es) played on 1954. Source: Diario El Comercio, La Prensa and Crónica.
Legend: Blue = home team win; Yellow = draw; Red = away team win.

== Top scorers ==
Rank	Player	Club	Goals
1	(Peru) Vicente Villanueva	Sporting Tabaco	14
2	(Argentina) Gualberto Bianco	Atlético Chalaco	13
3	(Peru) Alberto Loret de Mola	Centro Iqueño	12
4	(Peru) José Abán	Mariscal Sucre	11
4	(Peru) Faustino Delgado	Sporting Tabaco	11
5	(Peru) Félix Mina	Carlos Concha	10
5	(Peru) Óscar Gómez Sánchez	Alianza Lima	10
5	(Argentina) Roque Valsecchi	Ciclista Lima	10

== See also ==
- 1954 Campeonato de Apertura
- 1954 Peruvian Segunda División
- 1954 Ligas Provinciales de Lima y Callao
