= Jesús Villalobos Villegas =

Peruvian footballer (1927 – 1976)

Villalobos
Personal information
- Full name: Jesús Villalobos Villegas
- Date of birth: 1 July 1927
- Place of birth: Tambo de Mora, Peru
- Date of death: 1976 (aged 48–49)
- Place of death: Chincha, Peru
- Height: 1.79 m (5 ft 10 in)
- Position: Forward

Youth career
- Deportivo Frama

Senior career*
Years	Team	Apps	(Gls)
1947–1950	Mariscal Sucre		
1951–1954	Fluminense	87	(33)
1954	Ypiranga		
1955–1958	Guarani		
1958–1960	XV de Piracicaba		
- * Club domestic league appearances and goals as of 18 June 2024

Jesús Villalobos Villegas (1 July 1927 – 1976) was a Peruvian professional footballer who played as a forward.

== Career ==
Peruvian forward, Jesus Villalobos enjoyed success playing for Brazilian clubs Fluminense FC and Guarani FC during the 1950s. He was state and Copa Rio champion with Fluminense, in addition to being on the list of the greatest scorers in the history of Guarani with 87 goals.

== Honours ==
Fluminense

- Campeonato Carioca: 1951
- Copa Rio: 1952
- Torneio José de Paula Junior: 1952
