= Daniel Ruiz (footballer, born 1933) =

Peruvian footballer (1933–2024)

Personal information
- Full name: Daniel Ruiz La Rosa
- Date of birth: 16 September 1933
- Place of birth: Huaral, Peru
- Date of death: 6 November 2024 (aged 91)
- Position: Forward

Youth career
- Social Huando

Senior career*
Years	Team	Apps	(Gls)
1955–1963	Universitario		(93)
1963–1965	Mariscal Sucre		
1966–1968	Juan Aurich		

International career
1957	Peru	3	(0)
- * Club domestic league appearances and goals

Daniel Ruiz La Rosa (16 September 1933 – 6 November 2024) was a Peruvian professional footballer who played as forward.

He distinguished himself with Universitario de Deportes, finishing as the top scorer in the Peruvian league three times in the late 1950s.

His brother, Pedro Ruiz La Rosa, made a name for himself in the 1970s playing for Unión Huaral.

== Club career ==
With 93 goals scored for Universitario de Deportes between 1955 and 1963, Daniel Ruiz La Rosa – nicknamed El Chino – is one of the club's all-time leading scorers. He won two Peruvian championship titles with Universitario (1959 and 1960) and finished as the top scorer in the Peruvian league three times, in 1956, 1957, and 1959.

He ended his career at Juan Aurich in 1968 after a stint with Mariscal Sucre between 1963 and 1965.

== International career ==
He participated in the 1957 South American Championship, playing two matches, against Chile (1-0 victory) and Uruguay (3-5 defeat).

== Death ==
Daniel Ruiz dies on November 6, 2024.

== Honours ==
Universitario de Deportes

- Peruvian Primera División: 1959, 1960
- Peruvian Primera División Top scorer: 1956 (16 goals), 1957 (20), 1959 (28)
