= Manuel Rivera (footballer, born 1922) =

Peruvian footballer (1922–2005)

Personal information
- Full name: Manuel Teodoro Rivera Sánchez
- Date of birth: 15 May 1922
- Place of birth: Chimbote, Peru
- Date of death: July 2005 (aged 83)
- Place of death: Chimbote, Peru
- Position: Forward

Youth career
- Sport Boys (Chimbote)
- Unión Chimbote

Senior career*
| Years | Team | Apps | (Gls) |
| 1939–1948 | Ciclista Lima | | |
| 1949–1959 | Deportivo Municipal | | |
| 1959–1960 | CD Manuel Rivera | | |

International career
| 1952–1957 | Peru | 12 | (3) |
- * Club domestic league appearances and goals

Manuel Teodoro Rivera Sánchez (15 May 1922 – July 2005) was a Peruvian professional footballer who played as forward.

== Playing career ==
=== Club ===
Arriving in Lima in 1939, Manuel Rivera Sánchez joined Ciclista Lima, where he won the second division championship twice, in 1944 and 1946. Promoted to the first division in 1947, Ciclista Lima was relegated back to the second division in 1948, forcing Rivera to change clubs.

He moved to Deportivo Municipal in 1949 and won the Peruvian championship the following year. He remained there for nearly a decade before returning to Chimbote in 1959, where he ended his career with CD Manuel Rivera (now José Gálvez FBC) in 1960.

=== International ===
Peruvian international, Manuel Rivera earned 12 caps between 1952 and 1957, scoring three goals.

He played his first international tournament at the 1952 Panamerican Championship in Santiago, Chile, where he scored a goal against Mexico (3–0 victory). In 1953, he participated in the South American Championship in Lima, playing four matches. Four years later, he was called up again for the 1957 South American Championship, also in Lima, where he scored twice against Colombia (4–1 victory).

György Orth, the Hungarian coach of Peru, gave him a starting position in attack during the 1958 FIFA World Cup qualifiers: Manuel Rivera played in both qualifying matches against Brazil on April 13 and 21, 1957 (1–1 in Lima and 0–1 in Rio de Janeiro, respectively).

== Tributes ==
Manuel Rivera Sánchez is considered the most influential player in his hometown of Chimbote. Indeed, the port city's most important club, José Gálvez FBC, was founded in 1951 as Club Deportivo Manuel Rivera, taking his name. It wasn't until 1963 that it was renamed with its current name.

Two years after his death in July 2005, the José Gálvez FBC stadium was renamed Estadio Centenario Manuel Rivera Sánchez in his honor.

== Honours ==
Ciclista Lima

- Peruvian Segunda División (2): 1944, 1946

Deportivo Municipal

- Peruvian Primera División: 1950
