= Alberto Terry =

Peruvian footballer (1929-2006)

Alberto "Toto" Terry
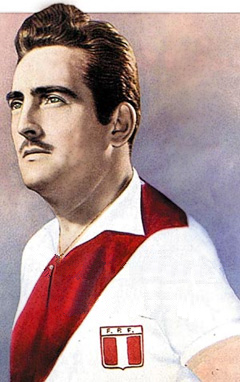

Personal information
- Full name: Alberto Terry Arias-Schreiber
- Date of birth: May 16, 1929
- Place of birth: Lima, Peru
- Date of death: February 7, 2006 (aged 76)
- Place of death: Lima, Peru
- Position: Attacking midfielder

Youth career
- Universitario

Senior career*
Years	Team	Apps	(Gls)
1947–1958	Universitario	181	(102)
1959–1960	Sporting Cristal	29	(9)

International career
1953–1959	Peru	25	(11)

Managerial career
- 1964–1966: Sporting Cristal
- 1972: Atlético Chalaco
- 1976: CNI
- * Club domestic league appearances and goals

Alberto Terry Arias-Schreiber (May 16, 1929 – February 7, 2006), popularly known as "Toto," was a Peruvian footballer who played as an attacking midfielder for Universitario de Deportes, Sporting Cristal, and the Peru national football team. He is recognized as one of Peru's most important midfielders.

Alberto "Toto" Terry was born in Lima on May 16, 1929. His parents were José Alejandro Terry Schreiber and Julia Arias-Schreiber Pezet. He is the grandson of Alois Schreiber, Austrian consul based in Huaraz. He was related to Fernando Belaúnde Terry on his paternal side.

After his professional retirement, he was recognized as one of the best Peruvian football players in history along with Teodoro "Lolo" Fernández, Valeriano López and later with Teófilo Cubillas, Héctor Chumpitaz and Hugo Sotil. He was a radio and print commentator in Peru. He died at the age of 76 in Lima on February 7, 2006. His remains rest in the Parque del memoria Cemetery in the district of Lurín.

== Playing career ==
=== Club career ===
Toto Terry spent the majority of his club career at Universitario and remains one of their most iconic players. During his career, Terry was approached by many major European and South American clubs, including SS Lazio and the Boca Juniors. However, Terry gave Universitario his last word. It always said: "From Lima, nobody moves me [...] as Lima is more beautiful than Paris, Rome or Buenos Aires."

During his time at Universitario, he won the 1949 Peruvian championship and played 181 matches there (scoring 102 goals). In 1959, he signed with Sporting Cristal, which at that time was the most expensive transfer in the history of Peruvian football (200 000 sols). He ended his career there the following year.

=== International career ===
Terry played for the Peru national team making 25 appearances and scoring 11 goals.

== Managerial career ==
After his playing career ended, Terry took over as manager of his last club, Sporting Cristal, from 1964 to 1966. In 1972, he was at the helm of Atlético Chalaco, a second-division club, which he led to promotion to the first division after a near-perfect season (20 matches played, 17 wins and 3 draws).

== Death ==
After switching to sports journalism, notably at the newspaper La Crónica where he wrote a column called "La columna de Alberto Terry", but also as a radio and television commentator, Alberto Terry died on February 7, 2006, at the age of 76, from lung cancer.

== Career statistics ==
=== International goals ===
Alberto Terry: International goals
No.	Date	Venue	Opponent	Score	Result	Competition
1	1953-03-08	Lima, Peru	Paraguay	2–1	2–2	1953 South American Championship
2	1953-07-28	Lima, Peru	Chile	1–0	5–0	Copa del Pacífico
3	1954-09-19	Santiago, Chile	Chile	1–1	4–2	Copa del Pacífico
4	1954-09-19	Santiago, Chile	Chile	2–2	4–2	Copa del Pacífico
5	1955-03-23	Santiago, Chile	Paraguay	1–0	1–1	1955 South American Championship
6	1957-03-10	Lima, Peru	Ecuador	1–0	2–1	1957 South American Championship
7	1957-03-10	Lima, Peru	Ecuador	2–0	2–1	1957 South American Championship
8	1957-03-23	Lima, Peru	Uruguay	1–0	5–3	1957 South American Championship
9	1957-03-27	Lima, Peru	Colombia	1–0	4–1	1957 South American Championship
10	1957-04-06	Lima, Peru	Argentina	2–1	2–1	1957 South American Championship
11	1957-04-13	Lima, Peru	Brazil	1–0	1–1	1958 World Cup Qualifier

== Honours ==
=== Player ===
Universitario de Deportes

- Peruvian League: 1949
- Peruvian League Top Scorer: 1950 (16 goals)

Peru

- Copa del Pacífico: 1953, 1954

=== Manager ===
Peru amateur

- Bolivarian Games: 1973

Atlético Chalaco

- Peruvian Segunda División: 1972
