= Vicente Villanueva (footballer) =

Peruvian footballer (1924–2014)

Personal information
- Full name: José Vicente Villanueva Zegarra
- Date of birth: 10 June 1924
- Place of birth: Lima, Peru
- Date of death: 24 March 2014 (aged 89)
- Place of death: Lima, Peru
- Position: Forward

Youth career
- Sucre FBC

Senior career*
Years	Team	Apps	(Gls)
1941	Ciclista Lima		
1942	Alfonso Ugarte (Chiclín)		
1943–1945	Ciclista Lima		
1945–1955	Sporting Tabaco		
1956–1957	Sporting Cristal		
1958	Defensor Arica		
- * Club domestic league appearances and goals

José Vicente Villanueva Zegarra (10 June 1924 – 24 March 2014) is a Peruvian professional footballer who played as forward.

== Career ==
Trained at Sucre FBC, Vicente Villanueva played for Ciclista Lima in the early 1940s after a brief stint with Alfonso Ugarte de Chiclín (northern Peru) in 1942.

In 1945, he joined Sporting Tabaco, where he made a name for himself by finishing as the top scorer in the Peruvian championship in 1954 (14 goals). The following year, he witnessed Sporting Tabaco's transition to Sporting Cristal and, on 24 June 1956, became the club's first goalscorer, opening the scoring with a header in Sporting Cristal's 2–1 friendly victory over Sport Boys. He also won the league title in 1956 with his new club.

In 1958, he finished his career with Defensor Arica in the second division.

== Death ==
Vicente Villanueva died in Lima on 24 March 2014.

== Honours ==
Sporting Cristal

- Peruvian Primera División: 1956

Sporting Tabaco

- Peruvian Primera División Top scorer: 1954 (14 goals)
