= 1933 Peruvian Primera División =

Peruvian Primera División
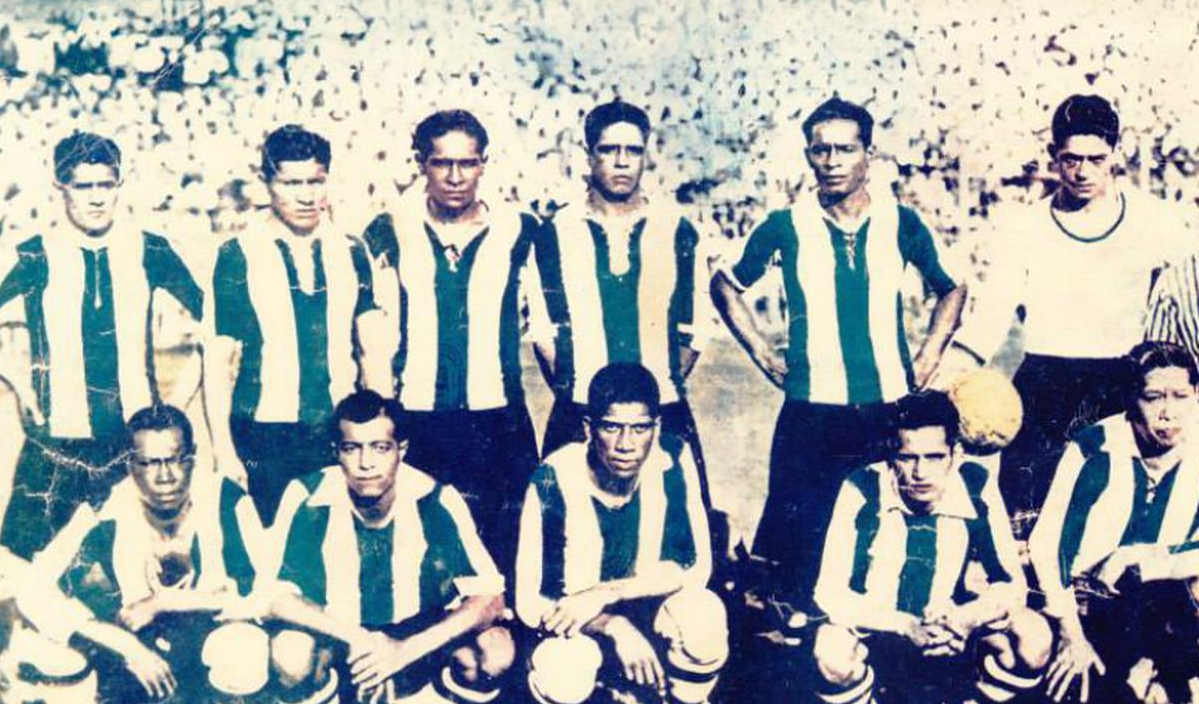
- Alianza Lima, champion
- Season: 1933
- Dates: 18 June 1933 – 27 August 1933
- Champions: Alianza Lima (7th title)
- Runner up: Universitario
- Relegated: Sport Progreso; Sportivo Unión
- Matches: 45
- Goals: 193 (4.29 per match)
- Top goalscorer: Teodoro Fernández (9 goals)

The 1933 season of the Peruvian Primera División was the 18th season of top-flight Peruvian football. A total of 10 teams competed in this league. The national champions were Alianza Lima.

First Division reduced to 9 teams for 1934. The team of Unión Carbone was promoted to next year.

== Format ==
- From 1931 until 1934 the results of a reserve teams league were added as bonus points.
- From 1931 until 1942 the points system was W:3, D:2, L:1, walkover:0.

== Teams ==
=== Team changes ===
Promoted from
1932 División Intermedia
▲ Sucre (1st)
▲ Sport Boys (2nd)

=== Stadia and Locations ===
| Team | City |
|---|---|
| Alianza Lima | La Victoria, Lima |
| Ciclista Lima | Cercado de Lima |
| Circolo Sportivo Italiano | Pueblo Libre, Lima |
| Sport Boys | Callao |
| Sport Progreso | Rímac, Lima |
| Sporting Tabaco | Rímac, Lima |
| Sportivo Tarapacá Ferrocarril | Cercado de Lima |
| Sportivo Unión | Cercado de Lima |
| Sucre | La Victoria, Lima |
| Universitario | Cercado de Lima |

== Torneo Primeros Equipos ==
=== Standings ===
| Pos | Team | Pld | W | D | L | GF | GA | GD | Pts | Qualification |
|---|---|---|---|---|---|---|---|---|---|---|
| 1 | Alianza Lima | 9 | 8 | 1 | 0 | 36 | 12 | +24 | 26 | Champions |
| 2 | Universitario | 9 | 7 | 2 | 0 | 28 | 8 | +20 | 25 | |
| 3 | Sucre | 9 | 4 | 2 | 3 | 21 | 15 | +6 | 19 | |
| 4 | Sport Boys | 9 | 4 | 2 | 3 | 18 | 21 | −3 | 19 | |
| 5 | Ciclista Lima | 9 | 4 | 0 | 5 | 20 | 24 | −4 | 17 | |
| 6 | Sportivo Tarapacá Ferrocarril | 9 | 3 | 1 | 5 | 17 | 18 | −1 | 16 | |
| 7 | Sporting Tabaco | 9 | 2 | 3 | 4 | 18 | 20 | −2 | 16 | |
| 8 | Circolo Sportivo Italiano | 9 | 3 | 1 | 5 | 11 | 14 | −3 | 16 | |
| 9 | Sport Progreso (Note: Sport Progreso were deducted one point for walkover.) | 9 | 3 | 1 | 5 | 13 | 21 | −8 | 15 | |
| 10 | Sportivo Unión | 9 | 0 | 1 | 8 | 11 | 40 | −29 | 10 | |

=== Results ===
Teams play each other once, either home or away. All matches were played in Lima.

| Home \ Away | ALI | CIC | CSI | SBA | PRO | TAB | SUN | SUC | TAR | UNI |
|---|---|---|---|---|---|---|---|---|---|---|
| Alianza Lima | | | | 5–1 | 5–2 | | | 3–2 | | 2–2 |
| Ciclista Lima | 2–5 | | 3–2 | | 3–1 | | 4–1 | | 1–0 | 1–5 |
| Circolo Sportivo Italiano | 0–2 | | | 1–1 | W.O. | 2–2 | | 0–2 | | |
| Sport Boys | | 3–1 | | | | | | | 2–1 | 2–5 |
| Sport Progreso | | | | 2–0 | | | 2–1 | | | 0–5 |
| Sporting Tabaco | 1–2 | 5–4 | | 1–1 | 1–2 | | 6–1 | | | |
| Sportivo Unión | 1–8 | | 1–1 | 3–5 | | | | 2–3 | 1–3 | |
| Sucre | | 2–1 | | 2–3 | 1–1 | 6–1 | | | | 1–1 |
| Sportivo Tarapacá Ferrocarril | 1–4 | | 0–3 | | 4–2 | 1–1 | | 3–2 | | 1–2 |
| Universitario | | | 2–1 | | | 1–0 | 5–0 | | | |

Updated to match(es) played on 1933. Source: Diario El Comercio, La Prensa and Crónica.
Legend: Blue = home team win; Yellow = draw; Red = away team win.

== Torneo Equipos de Reserva ==
=== Standings ===
| Pos | Team | Pld | W | D | L | Pts | Qualification |
|---|---|---|---|---|---|---|---|
| 1 | Sportivo Tarapacá Ferrocarril | 9 | 6 | 2 | 1 | 23 | Champions |
| 2 | Universitario | 9 | 6 | 1 | 2 | 22 | |
| 3 | Ciclista Lima | 9 | 6 | 1 | 2 | 22 | |
| 4 | Alianza Lima | 9 | 5 | 1 | 3 | 20 | |
| 5 | Sporting Tabaco | 9 | 3 | 3 | 3 | 18 | |
| 6 | Circolo Sportivo Italiano | 9 | 3 | 2 | 4 | 17 | |
| 7 | Sportivo Unión (Note: Sportivo Unión were deducted two points for walkovers.) | 9 | 4 | 1 | 4 | 16 | |
| 8 | Sport Progreso | 9 | 2 | 1 | 6 | 14 | |
| 9 | Sucre (Note: Sucre were deducted one point for walkover.) | 9 | 2 | 1 | 6 | 13 | |
| 10 | Sport Boys | 9 | 1 | 1 | 7 | 12 | |

== Tabla Absoluta ==
| Pos | Team | Pld | W | D | L | GF | GA | GD | Pts | Resv. | Total | Qualification or relegation |
|---|---|---|---|---|---|---|---|---|---|---|---|---|
| 1 | Alianza Lima (C) | 9 | 8 | 1 | 0 | 36 | 12 | +24 | 26 | 5 | 31 | Champions |
| 2 | Universitario | 9 | 7 | 2 | 0 | 28 | 8 | +20 | 25 | 5.5 | 30.5 | |
| 3 | Ciclista Lima | 9 | 4 | 0 | 5 | 20 | 24 | −4 | 17 | 5.5 | 22.5 | |
| 4 | Sucre | 9 | 4 | 2 | 3 | 21 | 15 | +6 | 19 | 3.25 | 22.25 | |
| 5 | Sport Boys | 9 | 4 | 2 | 3 | 18 | 21 | −3 | 19 | 3 | 22 | |
| 6 | Sportivo Tarapacá Ferrocarril | 9 | 3 | 1 | 5 | 17 | 18 | −1 | 16 | 5.75 | 21.75 | |
| 7 | Sporting Tabaco | 9 | 2 | 3 | 4 | 18 | 20 | −2 | 16 | 4.5 | 20.5 | |
| 8 | Circolo Sportivo Italiano | 9 | 3 | 1 | 5 | 11 | 14 | −3 | 16 | 3.5 | 19.5 | |
| 9 | Sport Progreso (R) | 9 | 3 | 1 | 5 | 13 | 21 | −8 | 15 | 3.5 | 18.5 | 1934 División Intermedia |
| 10 | Sportivo Unión (R) | 9 | 0 | 1 | 8 | 11 | 40 | −29 | 10 | 4 | 14 | 1934 División Intermedia |

== See also ==
- 1933 Peruvian División Intermedia
- 1933 Liga Provincial del Callao
