= José Arana (footballer, born 1902) =

Peruvian footballer and manager

Personal information
- Full name: José Arana Cruz
- Date of birth: 6 September 1902
- Place of birth: Lima, Peru
- Date of death: unknown
- Position: Midfielder

Senior career*
Years	Team	Apps	(Gls)
1918–1922	Atlético Chalaco		
1922–1923	Club Teniente Ruiz		
1923–1925	Unión Buenos Aires		
1926	Alianza Lima		
1927	Unión Buenos Aires		
1928–1930	Atlético Chalaco		
1931	Everton	4	(0)
1932	Atlético Chalaco		
1933	Sporting Tabaco		
1936	Everton		

Managerial career
- 1936: Everton
- 1942: Sport Boys
- 1944: Atlético Chalaco
- 1945: Sport Boys
- 1946: Colombia
- 1947: Atlético Chalaco
- 1947: Peru (5)
- 1948: Sport Boys
- 1949–1950: Sporting Tabaco
- 1951: Atlético Chalaco
- * Club domestic league appearances and goals

José Arana Cruz (6 September 1902 – unknown), also known as Patuto, was a Peruvian footballer and manager who played and oversaw several clubs in the Peruvian Primera División, as well as the national teams of Colombia in 1946 and Peru in 1947, leading the former to its first-ever title at 1946 Central American and Caribbean Games.

== Playing career ==
Born in Lima in 1902, José Arana began his football career at his hometown club Atlético Chalaco in 1918, from which he joined Club Teniente Ruiz in the mid-1920s. He was a fierce defensive midfielder who had no qualms about scratching his opponents. Throughout the 1920s, he played for several renowned Peruvian teams, such as Alianza Lima and Unión Buenos Aires, before returning to Atlético Chalaco, where he stayed until 1930, when he left Peru to play for Everton in Chile. He retired at Sporting Tabaco in 1933, aged 31, having enjoyed a particularly lengthy career for that time of 15 years.

Three years later, however, in early 1936, the 34-year-old Arana decided to come out of retirement at the request of Everton's new president, Luis Izarnótegui, who wanted to sign ten Peruvian players as a means to help rebuild the club. Arana agreed to help him, leading the recruitment efforts of ten Peruvian players and then leading the team on the field as a player-coach. These players made their debut for Everton on 29 March 1936, in a friendly match against the Uruguayan Montevideo Wanderers, still undefeated in its tour of Chile; Arana Cruz scored a penalty to help his side to a 2–1 victory. A few months later, on 13 July, he once again scored in a 2–1 friendly win, this time against Badminton de Santiago. His action of bringing so many Peruvian players to Chile was highly criticized in Peru, so Arana decided to settle in Valparaíso for a few years.

== Managerial career ==
In the early 1940s, Arana returned to Peru, where he coached several mid-table teams, such as Sport Boys and his former club Atlético Chalaco. In late 1946, while managing the former club, he received a call to take over the Colombian national team for the 1946 Central American and Caribbean Games, and his impact was immediate, as the team went on to win all of its six match, thus claiming the gold medals, a feat that Colombia never repeated. Despite his achievements, Arana Cruz did not renew his contract with the Colombian Football Federation. Some sources suggest that during his brief stint at the helm of Colombia, he became the first to call up goalkeeper Efraín Sánchez, but such reports have never been confirmed.

Having returned to his homeland of Peru, Arana guided Chalaco to a triumph at the 1947, which convinced the Peruvian Football Federation to take over the national team for the 1947 South American Championship, where Peru finished 5th.

== Honours ==
=== As a player ===
Atlético Chalaco

- Peruvian Primera División:
  - Champions (1): 1930

=== As a manager ===
Sport Boys

- Peruvian Primera División:
  - Champions (1): 1942

Atlético Chalaco

- Central American and Caribbean Games:
  - Champions (1): 1946

Atlético Chalaco

- Peruvian Primera División:
  - Champions (1): 1947
