= Monument to the Unknown Soldier, Lima =

Monument in Lima, Peru

Coordinates: 12°10′19″S 77°01′51″W

Monument to the Unknown Soldier
- Monumento al soldado desconocido
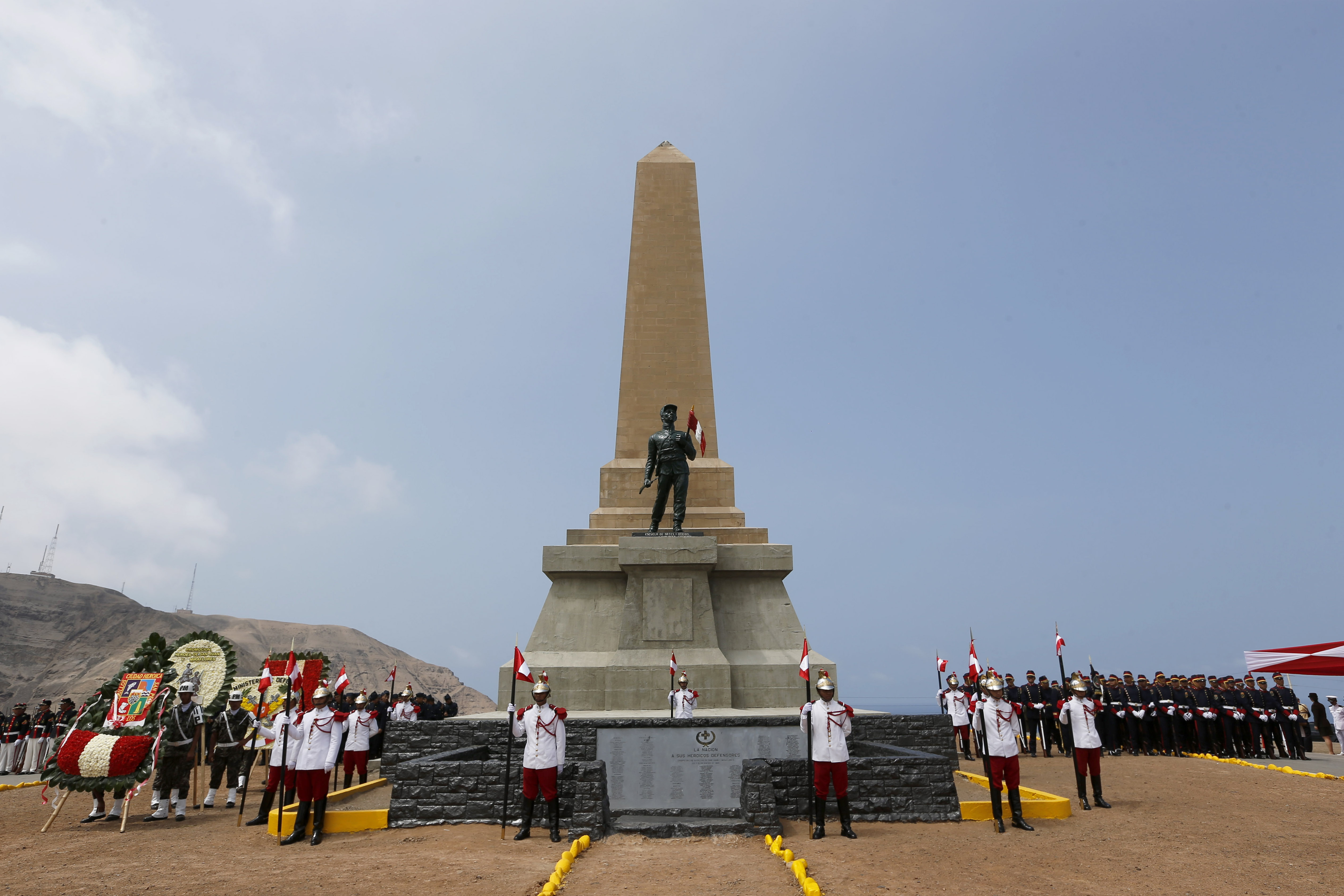
- Location: Morro Solar
- Beginning date: November 27, 1921
- Opening date: July 27, 1922
- Dedicated to: Unknown soldier

The Monument to the Unknown Soldier is a memorial located on a plain on the slopes of the northern side of Morro Solar in the district of Chorrillos, in Lima, Peru. It is dedicated to those killed during the War of the Pacific.

== History ==
It was built during the second government of President Augusto B. Leguía, as part of an urban program to modernize the city. President Leguía attended its inauguration on July 27, 1922.

It has three bronze plaques made by the Peruvian sculptor Luis Felipe Agurto that represent the stages of the Battle of San Juan and Chorrillos which disappeared in 2007 as a result of vandalism and abandonment until 2018, when they were replaced thanks to a donation from the Peruvian Astronomy Association, whose headquarters are located in the Morro Solar Planetarium, a few meters from the monument.

== See also ==
- Morro Solar
