= 1943 Primera División Regional de Lima y Callao =

Association football season

Primera División Regional de Lima y Callao
- Season: 1943
- Dates: 4 November 1943 – 25 December 1943
- Champions: Jorge Chávez
- Relegated: Alianza Tucumán

The 1943 season of the Primera División Regional de Lima y Callao, the third category of Peruvian football, was played by 8 teams. Jorge Chávez were crowned champions of the tournament and earned promotion to the 1944 Segunda División.

== Format ==
- The results of a reserve teams league were added as bonus points.
- The points system was W:3, D:2, L:1, walkover:0.

== Teams ==
=== Team changes ===
Promoted to 1943 Segunda División	Promoted from 1942 Segunda División Regional de Lima y Callao
▲ Ciclista Lima (1st) ▲ Progresista Apurímac (2nd)	▲ Association Chorrillos (1st Serie A) ▲KDT Nacional (1st Serie B)

=== Stadia locations ===
Team	City
Alianza Tucumán	Callao
Association Chorrillos	Chorrillos, Lima
Atlético Lusitania	Barrios Altos, Lima
Jorge Chávez	Callao
Juventud Perú	Barrios Altos, Lima
KDT Nacional	Callao
Porvenir Miraflores	Miraflores, Lima
Unión Carbone	Barrios Altos, Lima

== League table ==
=== Primeros Equipos ===
Pos	Team	Pld	W	D	L	GF	GA	GD	Pts	Qualification or relegation
1	Jorge Chávez (C)	7	5	1	1	13	6	+7	18	1944 Segunda División
2	Atlético Lusitania	7	3	3	1	13	8	+5	16	
3	Porvenir Miraflores	7	4	1	2	8	6	+2	16	
4	KDT Nacional	7	3	2	2	12	10	+2	15	
5	Alianza Tucumán	7	2	2	3	8	8	0	13	
6	Juventud Perú	7	1	4	2	8	10	−2	13	
7	Association Chorrillos	7	2	2	3	7	13	−6	13	
8	Unión Carbone	7	0	1	6	5	14	−9	8	

(C) Champions

=== Results ===
Teams play each other once, either home or away. All matches were played in Lima and Callao.

Home \ Away	TUC	ACH	LUS	JCC	KDT	JUV	POR	CAR
Alianza Tucumán		3–1			0–1		1–2	2–1
Association Chorrillos			0–2			1–1	0–3	
Atlético Lusitania	0–0				3–3		1–2	
Jorge Chávez	2–1	1–2	2–2					1–0
KDT Nacional		1–2		2–3		1–1	3–0	
Juventud Perú	1–1		0–3	0–3				4–0
Porvenir Miraflores				0–2		1–1		1–0
Unión Carbone		1–2	2–3		1–2			

Updated to match(es) played on 1943. Source: Diario El Comercio, La Prensa and Crónica.
Legend: Blue = home team win; Yellow = draw; Red = away team win.

=== Tabla Absoluta ===
Pos	Team	Pld	W	D	L	GF	GA	GD	Pts	Resv.	Total	Qualification or relegation
1	Jorge Chávez	7	5	2	0	15	5	+10	19	2.375	21.375	1944 Segunda División
2	Atlético Lusitania	7	3	3	1	13	8	+5	16	2.25	18.25	
3	KDT Nacional	7	3	2	2	12	10	+2	15	2.875	17.875	
4	Porvenir Miraflores	7	4	1	2	8	6	+2	16	1.125	17.125	
5	Juventud Perú	7	1	4	2	8	10	−2	13	2.625	15.625	
6	Association Chorrillos	7	2	2	3	7	13	−6	13	2.55	15.55	
7	Alianza Tucumán	7	2	2	3	8	8	0	13	1.25	14.25	Liguilla de Promoción
8	Unión Carbone	7	0	1	6	5	14	−9	8	2.125	10.125	Liguilla de Promoción

== Liguilla de Promoción ==
The teams that placed 7th and 8th in the 1943 Primera División Regional de Lima y Callao (Alianza Tucumán and Unión Carbone), together with the teams that placed 1st in Serie A (Juventud Gloria) and Serie B (Unión Callao) of the 1943 Segunda División Regional de Lima y Callao, took part in the Promotion Playoff (Liguilla de Promoción).

=== Standings ===
Pos	Team	Pld	W	D	L	GF	GA	GD	Pts	Qualification or relegation	GLO	UNI	CAR	TUC
1	Juventud Gloria	3	2	1	0	5	2	+3	8	1944 Primera Regional de Lima y Callao		1–0	1–1	
2	Unión Callao	3	2	0	1	8	3	+5	7	1944 Primera Regional de Lima y Callao				6–2
3	Unión Carbone	3	0	2	1	1	3	−2	5	1944 Primera Regional de Lima y Callao		0–2		0–0
4	Alianza Tucumán (R)	3	0	1	2	3	9	−6	4	1944 Segunda Regional de Lima y Callao	1–3			

Legend: Blue = home team win; Yellow = draw; Red = away team win.
(R) Relegated

== See also ==
- 1943 Peruvian Primera División
- 1943 Peruvian Segunda División
