= Liga Regional de Lima y Callao (1941–1950) =

- Founded: 1941
- Folded: 1950
- Country: Peru
- Confederation: CONMEBOL
- Level on pyramid: 2 (1941–1942); 3 (1943–1950)
- Promotion to: Primera División; Segunda División

The Liga Regional de Lima y Callao, the second division of Peruvian football (soccer) in 1941, and the third division of Peruvian football (soccer) in 1942 until 1950. The tournament was played on a home-and-away round-robin basis. Since its inception in 1941 as "Liga Regional de Lima y Callao", the Liga Regional consisted of the First Division, Second Division and Third Division.

== Division levels ==
Since its inception in 1941 as "Segunda División", the Liga Regional de Lima y Callao has changed levels (between 2 and 3). The table below shows them in details:

=== 1941 ===
Level	Division(s)/League(s)
1	Primera División (División de Honor)
2	Segunda División Regional
3	Tercera División Regional

=== 1942 ===
Level	Division(s)/League(s)
1	Primera División (División de Honor)
2	Primera División Regional
3	Segunda División Regional
4	Tercera División Regional

=== 1943–1950 ===
Level	Division(s)/League(s)
1	Primera División (División de Honor)
2	Segunda División
3	Primera División Regional
4	Segunda División Regional
5	Tercera División Regional

== Primera División Regional de Lima y Callao ==
=== List of champions ===
Ed.	Season	Champion	Runner-up
As First Division tournament
1	1941	Universitario de Deportes	Deportivo Municipal
As Second Division tournament
2	1942	Ciclista Lima	Progresista Apurímac
As Third Division tournament
3	1943	Jorge Chávez	Atlético Lusitania
4	1944	Atlético Lusitania	Unión Callao
5	1945	Unión Callao	Association Chorrillos
6	1946	Carlos Concha	KDT Nacional
7	1947	Defensor Arica	KDT Nacional
–	1948	No Tournament due to the 1948 Peruvian coup d'etat and Presidency.	
8	1949	Unión Carbone	Porvenir Miraflores
9	1950	KDT Nacional	Juventud Gloria
Defunct Tournament (See: Ligas Provinciales de Lima y Callao)

== Segunda División Regional de Lima y Callao ==
=== List of champions ===
Ed.	Season		Champion	Runner-up
As Second Division tournament
1	1941		Santiago Barranco	Centro Iqueño
As Third Division tournament
2	1942	Serie A	Association Chorrillos	Coronel León Velarde
2	1942	Serie B	KDT Nacional	Santiago Rossell
As Fourth Division tournament
3	1943	Serie A	Juventud Gloria	Alianza Pino
3	1943	Serie B	Unión Callao	San Lorenzo de Almagro
4	1944	Serie A	Defensor Arica	Defensor Guido
4	1944	Serie B	San Lorenzo de Almagro	Jorge Washington
5	1945	Serie A	Defensor Guido	Pedro Icochea
5	1945	Serie B	Carlos Concha	Atlético Ucayali
6	1946	Serie A	Estudiantes San Roberto	Unión Buenos Aires
6	1946	Serie B	Deportivo Colonial	Sportivo Palermo
7	1947	Serie A	Combinado Rímac	Unión Lloque Yupanqui
7	1947	Serie B	White Star	Jorge Washington
–	1948		No Tournament due to the 1948 Peruvian coup d'etat and Presidency.	
8	1949	Serie A	Juventud Perú	Defensor Lima
8	1949	Serie B	Juventud Soledad	Atlético Barrio Frigorífico
9	1950		The 9 best-places teams were promoted.^{[A]}	
Defunct Tournament (See: Ligas Provinciales de Lima y Callao)

=== Footnotes ===
A. At the end of the season, the 9 best-placed teams were directly promoted to 1951 Ligas Provinciales de Lima y Callao. These teams were Defensor Lima, Juventud White Star, Deportivo Olivos, Unión Lloque Yupanqui, Unión Estrella, Sportivo Palermo, Jorge Washington, Ciclista Alianza Miraflores and Atlético Barrio Frigorífico.

== Tercera División Regional de Lima y Callao ==
=== List of champions ===
Ed.	Season	Champion	Runner-up
As Third Division tournament
1	1941	Defensor Arica	Association Chorrillos
As Fourth Division tournament
2	1942	The 10 best-places teams qualified to Promotion Playoffs.^{[B]}	
As Fifth Division tournament
3	1943	Atlético Ucayali	Jorge Washington
4	1944	Atlético Excelsior	Unión Buenos Aires
5	1945	The 12 best-places teams were promoted.^{[C]}	
6	1946	White Star	Villa Olímpica
7	1947	Ciclista Alianza Miraflores	Deportivo Olivos
–	1948	No Tournament due to the 1948 Peruvian coup d'etat and Presidency.	
8	1949	Alianza Libertad	Unión América
9	1950	Defensor Espinar	—^{[D]}
Defunct Tournament (See: Ligas Provinciales de Lima y Callao)

=== Footnotes ===
B. At the end of the 1942 Tercera División Regional season, the 10 best-placed teams qualified to Promotion Playoffs. These teams were Defensor Arica, Juventud White Star, Roberto Acevedo, Atlético Peruano, Once Amigos Lobatón, Ciclista Alianza Miraflores, Sport Almagro, San Lorenzo de Almagro, Unión Callao and Nueve de Diciembre.

C. At the end of the 1945 Tercera División Regional season, the 12 best-placed teams were directly promoted to 1946 Segunda División Provincial de Lima y Callao). These teams were Unión Lloque Yupanqui and Unión Porvenir (Serie A), Estudiantes San Roberto and Barrio Obrero Caquetá (Serie B), Alianza Limoncillo and Combinado Rímac (Serie C), Victoria FBC and Once Amigos Lobatón (Serie D), Atlético Barrio Frigorífico and Deportivo Colonial (Serie E), and Fraternal Barranco and Unión Buenos Aires (Serie F).

D. At the end of the 1950 Tercera División Regional season, the 5 best-placed teams were directly promoted to 1951 Segunda División Provincial de Lima y Callao). These teams were Defensor Espinar as champion, Deportivo Huáscar, Defensor Breña, Roberto Acevedo and Silver Boys.
