= Parque Reducto No. 2 =

Park in Lima, Peru

Coordinates: 12°07′35″S 77°01′21″W

Parque Reducto № 2
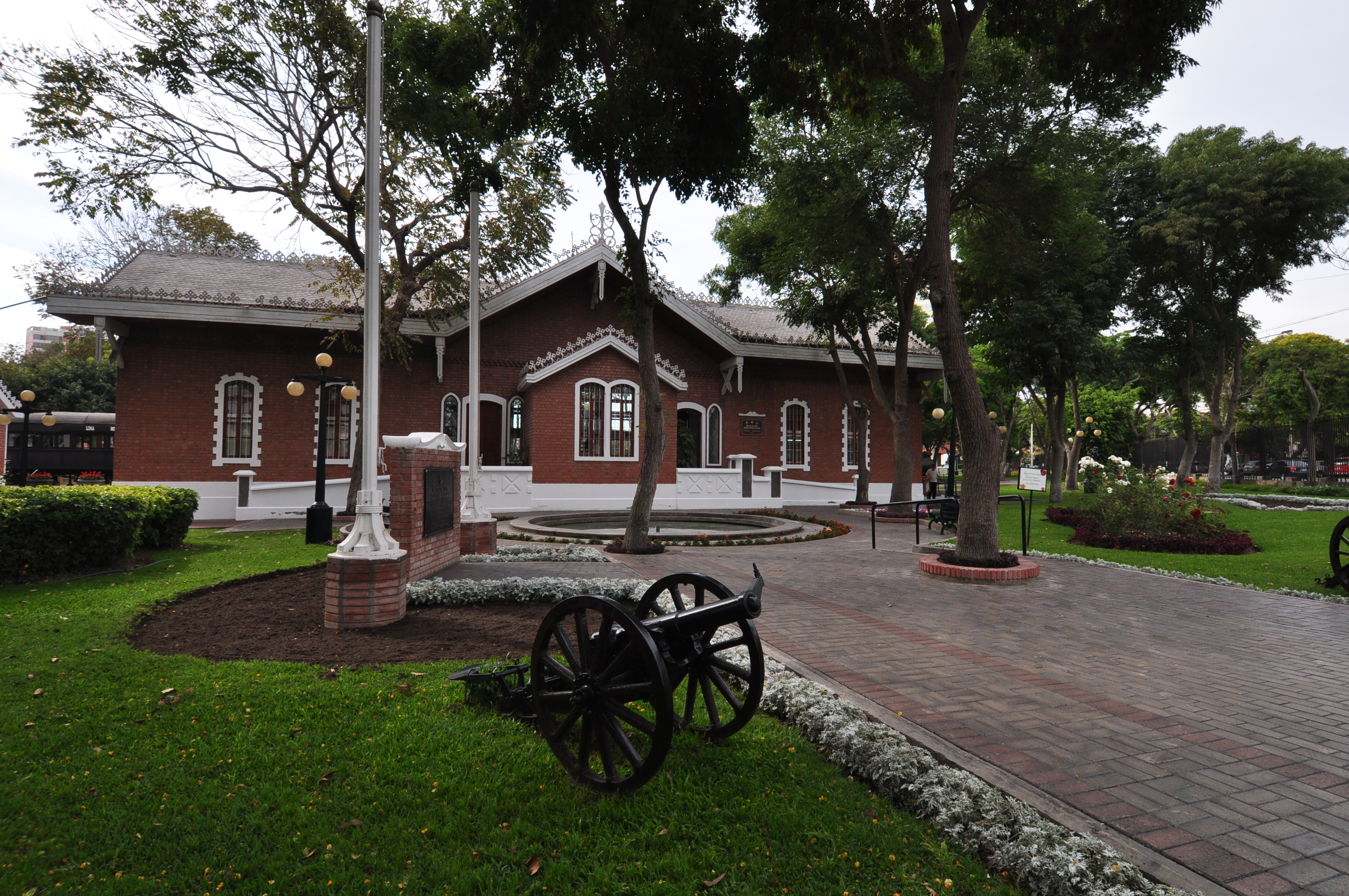
- Former train station
- Type: Public park
- Location: Miraflores District, Lima
- Open: 7 a.m. — 6 p.m.
- Designation: Cultural heritage of Peru

Redoubt No. 2 Park (Spanish: Parque Reducto № 2) is a 20,000 m^{2} public park located at the intersections of Benavides and Luis Bedoya Reyes avenues, in Miraflores District, Lima, Peru. Located in a former redoubt built by the Peruvian Army during the War of the Pacific, it was declared a National Monument in 1944, and a Patriotic Sanctuary in 1965.

The building formerly used as a train station now houses a museum dedicated to Andrés Avelino Cáceres.

== History ==
The redoubts (reductos) were defenses built by the Peruvian Army in order to defend Lima from the Chilean Army during the War of the Pacific. In 1880, the Chileans had landed in Pisco and had successfully pushed north toward the city. There were ten in total:

- Reducto No. 1: located at the esplanade of Chorrillos, it was where Battalion No. 2 was entrenched under the command of Colonel Manuel Lecca. Among its civilian defenders was Augusto B. Leguía.
- Reducto No. 2: it housed Battalion No. 4, with 300 men, under the command of Ramón Ribeyro, who fought alongside other lawyers and deputies of the city. It received the troops of Belisario Suárez after their defeat at San Juan.
- Reducto No. 3: located at the former Fundo La Palma, it is where Battalion No. 6 fought under the command of lawyer Narciso de la Colina, supported by the troops of Justo Pastor Dávila.
- Reducto No. 4: located in the same place, it house Battalion No. 8 under the command of Juan de Dios Rivero, then Minister of Finance, alongside other state employees.
- Reducto No. 5: located in La Calera de la Merced. Possibly where the 10th battalion fought under the command of the La Calera hacienda's owner, José M. León.
- Reducto Nos. 6 and 7: located between La Calera and the Hacienda Vásquez, under the command of Juan Martín Echenique.
- Reducto Nos. 8, 9 and 10: located between the Hacienda Vásquez and an area formerly part of Ate District. 12 battalions were based here, who did not see action.№

5,500 men in total fought in the first four redobuts, since the rest were dissolved by Nicolás de Piérola and did not see action. The Chilean troops were numbered at 8,000 men—supported by the Chilean Navy—with 3,000 Peruvians and 2,214 Chileans being killed in action. Some of the unidentified bodies at the site were subsequently moved to the crypt at the city's main cemetery.

The park, located at the second redoubt, was declared a National Monument in 1944, and a Patriotic Sanctuary in 1965 (alongside redoubt No. 3—today No. 5—and the Morro Solar). It was subsequently remodelled in 1995 by then mayor of Miraflores, Alberto Andrade. It keeps the original barricade built in 1881, alongside some cannons used during the war.

== Gallery ==
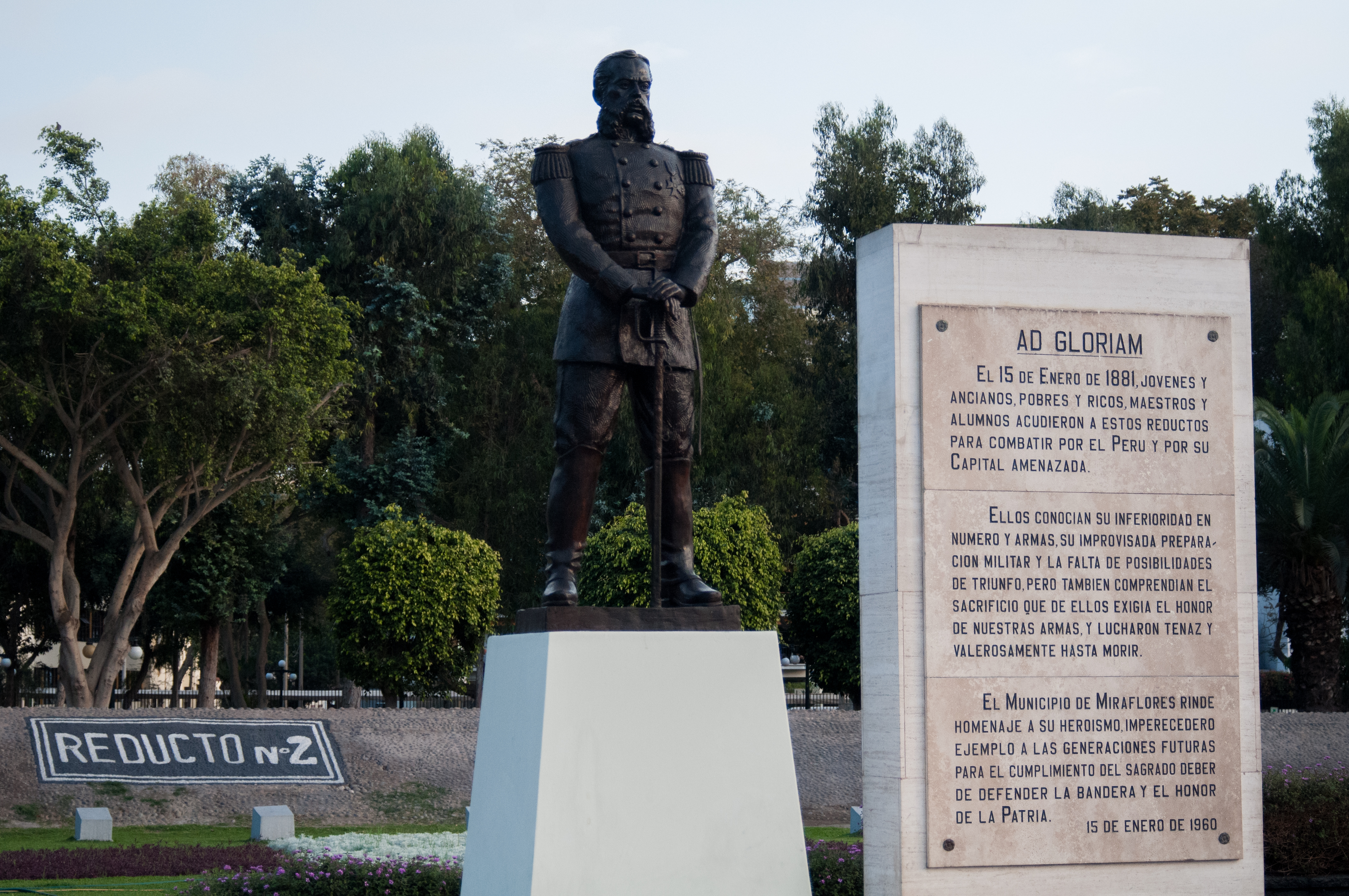
Statue of Andrés Avelino Cáceres

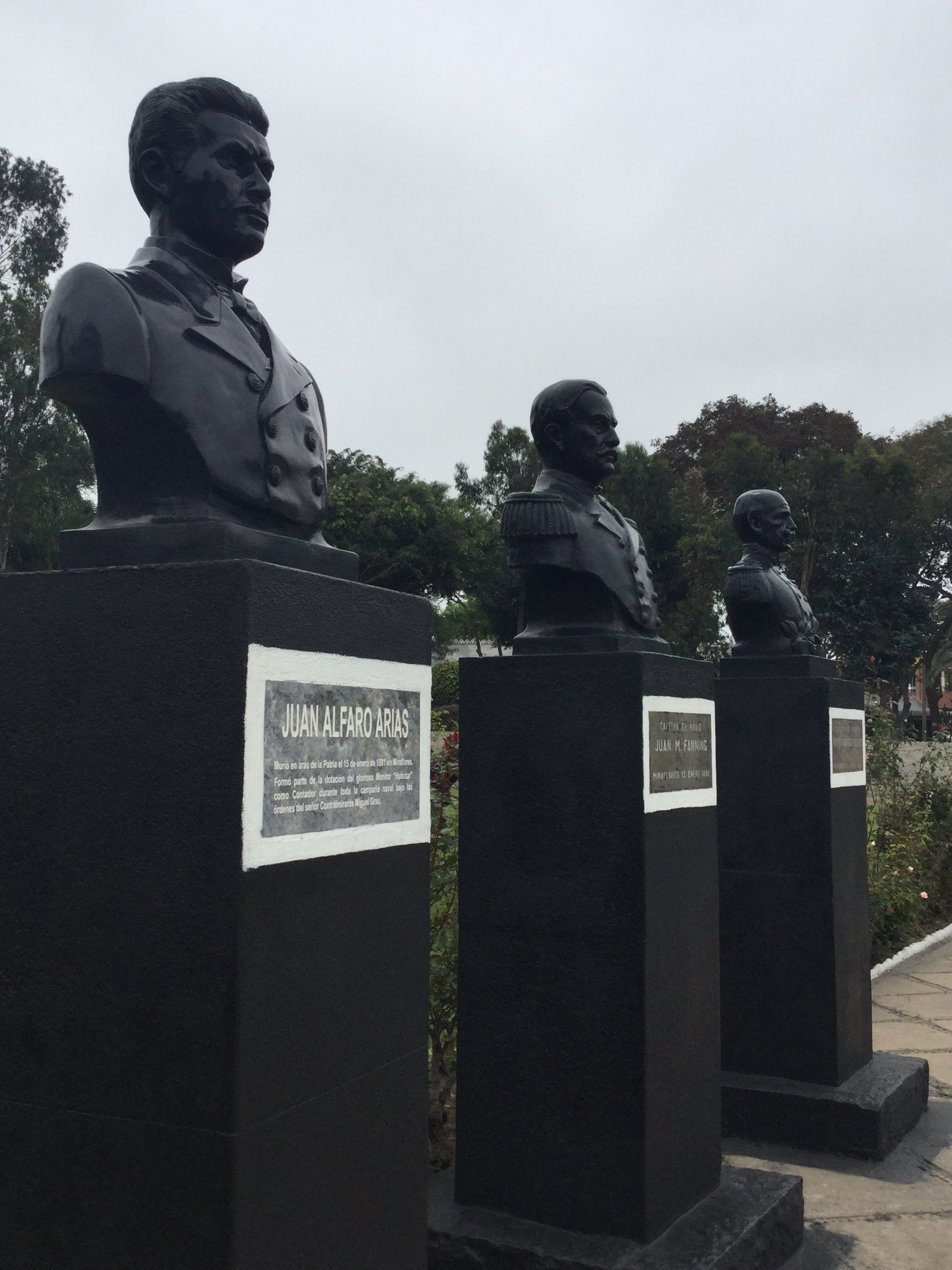
Busts of participants of the battle

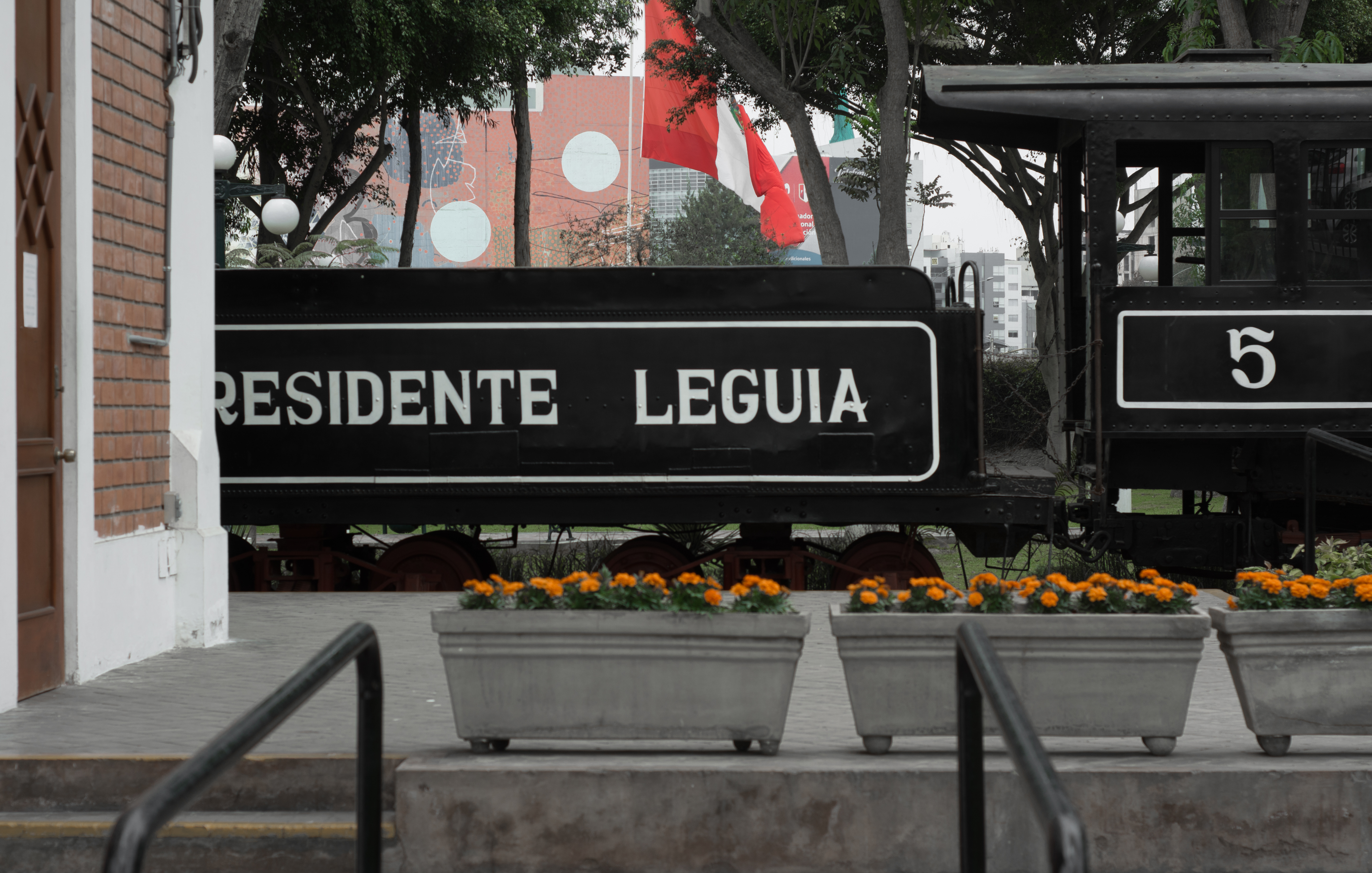
Locomotive

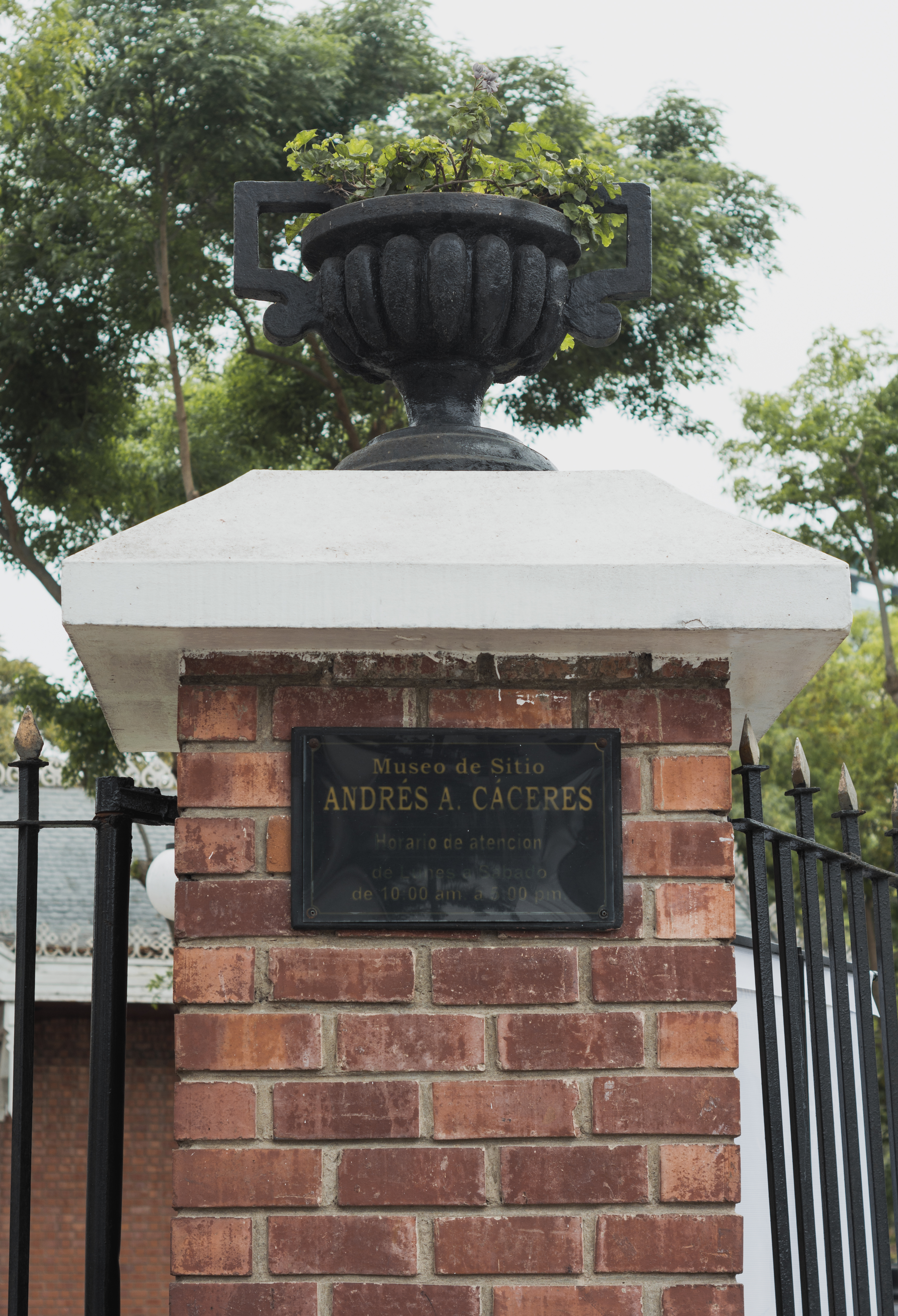
Museum entrance

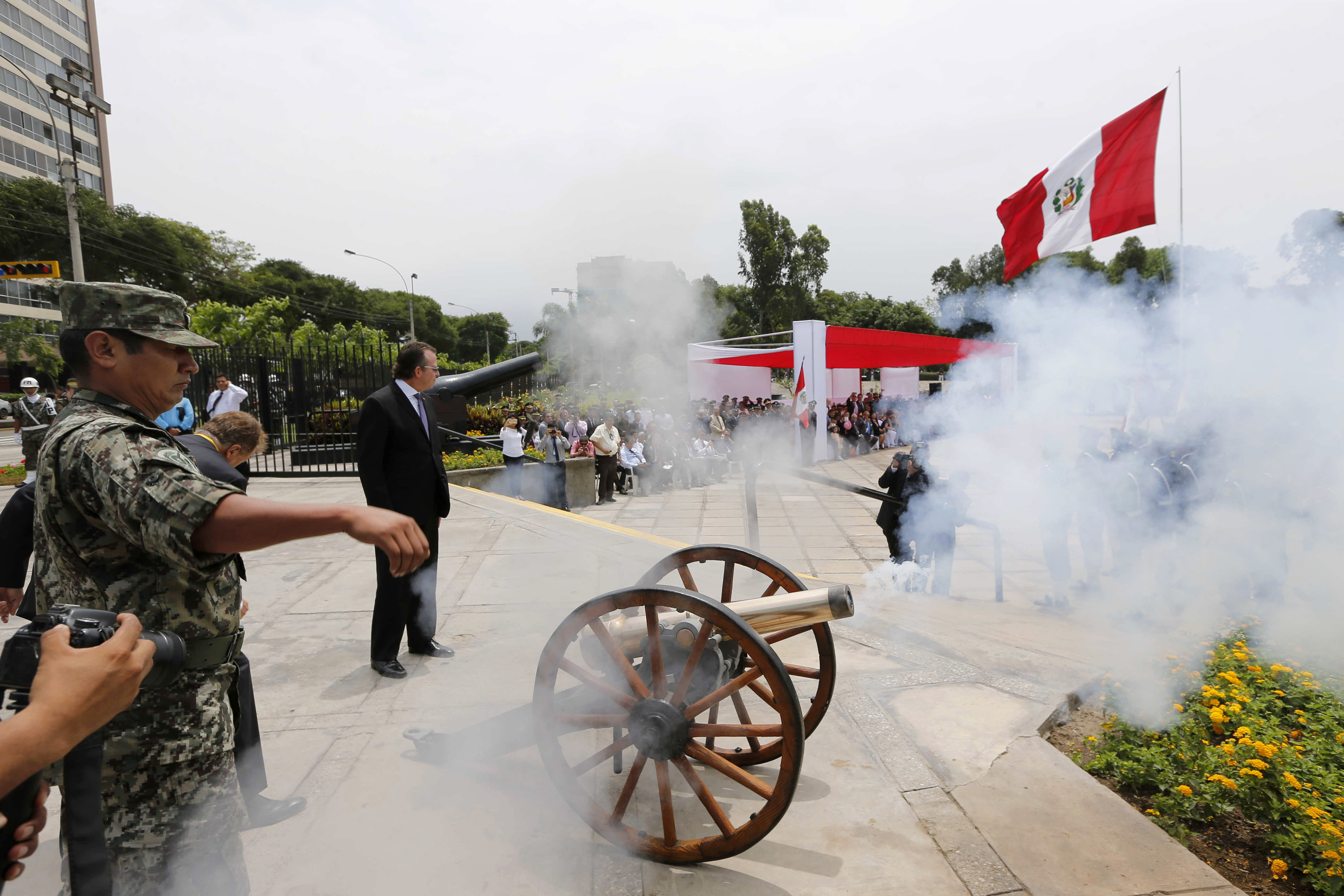
Ceremony for the 135th anniversary of the battle of Miraflores

== See also ==
- Morro Solar
- Parque Reducto No. 5
