= 1943 Peruvian Segunda División =

Peruvian Segunda División
- Season: 1943
- Dates: 22 April 1944 – 28 May 1944
- Champions: Telmo Carbajo
- Runner up: Progresista Apurímac
- Matches: 12
- Goals: 52 (4.33 per match)

The 1943 Peruvian Segunda División, the second division of Peruvian football (soccer), was played by 4 teams. The tournament winner, Telmo Carbajo was promoted to the Promotional Playoff. Jorge Chávez was promoted to the 1944 Peruvian Segunda División.

== Teams ==
=== Team changes ===
| Promoted from 1942 Primera División Regional de Lima y Callao | Relegated from 1942 Primera División |
|---|---|
| ▲ Ciclista Lima (1st) ▲ Progresista Apurímac (2nd) | ▼ Telmo Carbajo (9th) ▼ Santiago Barranco (10th) |

=== Stadia and locations ===
| Team | City |
|---|---|
| Ciclista Lima | Cercado de Lima |
| Progresista Apurímac | Callao |
| Santiago Barranco | Barranco, Lima |
| Telmo Carbajo | Callao |

== League table ==
=== Standings ===
| Pos | Team | Pld | W | D | L | GF | GA | GD | Pts | Qualification or relegation |
|---|---|---|---|---|---|---|---|---|---|---|
| 1 | Telmo Carbajo (C) | 6 | 4 | 1 | 1 | 20 | 14 | +6 | 9 | Promotion play-off |
| 2 | Progresista Apurímac | 6 | 2 | 3 | 1 | 13 | 11 | +2 | 7 | |
| 3 | Ciclista Lima | 6 | 2 | 1 | 3 | 13 | 13 | 0 | 5 | |
| 4 | Santiago Barranco | 6 | 1 | 1 | 4 | 6 | 14 | −8 | 3 | |

(C) Champions

== Results ==
Teams play each other once, either home or away. All matches were played in Lima.

| Home \ Away | CIC | PRO | SAN | TEL |
|---|---|---|---|---|
| Ciclista Lima | | 2–3 | 2–0 | 5–3 |
| Progresista Apurímac | 1–1 | | 1–1 | 2–3 |
| Santiago Barranco | 2–1 | 1–3 | | 1–2 |
| Telmo Carbajo | 4–2 | 3–3 | 5–1 | |

Updated to match(es) played on 1943. Source: Diario El Comercio, La Prensa and Crónica.
Legend: Blue = home team win; Yellow = draw; Red = away team win.

== Promotion play-off ==
The promotion/relegation play-off was a two-legged series played by the team placing 8th in the 1943 Primera División, Centro Iqueño and the 1943 Segunda División champion Telmo Carbajo.

| 4 June 1944 | Telmo Carbajo | 1–4 | Centro Iqueño | Estadio Nacional, Lima |
| 13:30 | 53' (pen.) | | Quintana; (o.g.); Eduardo Romero 60' |

| 11 June 1944 | Centro Iqueño | 4–0 | Telmo Carbajo | Estadio Nacional, Lima |
| 13:30 | | | | Referee: Manuel Ruiz |

Centro Iqueño remain in the Primera División.

== See also ==
- 1943 Peruvian Primera División
- 1943 Primera División Regional de Lima y Callao
