= 1943 Peruvian Primera División =

Peruvian Primera División
- Season: 1943
- Dates: 12 September 1943 – 14 November 1943
- Champions: Deportivo Municipal (3rd title)
- Runner up: Alianza Lima
- Relegated: none
- Matches: 56
- Goals: 209 (3.73 per match)
- Top goalscorer: Germán Cerro (9 goals)

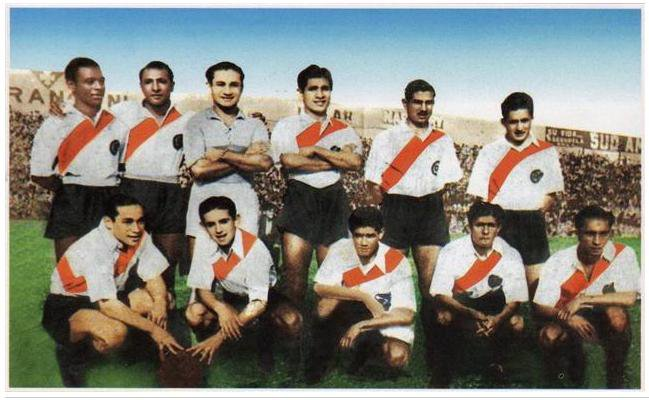
Deportivo Municipal team, 1943 First Division champion.

The 1943 season of the Peruvian Primera División, the top category of Peruvian football, was played by 8 teams. The national champions were Deportivo Municipal.

No team was promoted or relegated.

== Teams ==
=== Team changes ===
Relegated from
1942 Primera División
▼ Telmo Carbajo (9th)
▼ Santiago Barranco (9th)

=== Stadia locations ===
Team	City	Mannager
Alianza Lima	La Victoria, Lima	(Peru) Gerardo Arce
Atlético Chalaco	Callao	(Peru) José Arana
Centro Iqueño	Cercado de Lima	
Deportivo Municipal	Cercado de Lima	(Peru) Juan Valdivieso
Sport Boys	Callao	(Peru) Raúl Chappell
Sporting Tabaco	Rímac, Lima	(Uruguay) Julio Manisse
Sucre	La Victoria, Lima	(Argentina) José Luis Boffi
Universitario	Cercado de Lima	(Peru) Arturo Fernández

== League table ==
=== Standings ===
Pos	Team	Pld	W	D	L	GF	GA	GD	Pts	Promotion or relegation
1	Deportivo Municipal (C)	14	9	4	1	39	15	+24	22	Champions
2	Alianza Lima	14	7	3	4	30	19	+11	17	
3	Sport Boys	14	7	3	4	28	21	+7	17	
4	Sporting Tabaco	14	7	2	5	26	24	+2	16	
5	Atlético Chalaco	14	4	4	6	23	24	−1	12	
6	Universitario	14	5	2	7	27	32	−5	12	
7	Sucre	14	2	7	5	22	25	−3	11	
8	Centro Iqueño (O)	14	2	1	11	14	49	−35	5	Promotion/relegation play-off

(C) Champions; (O) Play-off winners

== Results ==
Home \ Away	ALI	CHA	CEN	MUN	SBA	TAB	SUC	UNI
Alianza Lima		1–0	4–2	2–2	0–1	3–0	2–1	5–0
Atlético Chalaco	1–1		4–0	2–2	0–1	4–2	2–2	2–4
Centro Iqueño	1–4	2–1		2–4	1–2	2–3	1–1	1–0
Deportivo Municipal	3–0	4–1	4–0		2–3	2–1	4–1	4–1
Sport Boys	2–4	1–2	5–0	1–1		3–2	1–1	3–1
Sporting Tabaco	2–1	2–1	5–1	0–0	1–0		2–1	3–1
Sucre	3–3	1–2	4–0	0–2	2–2	2–2		2–2
Universitario	1–0	1–1	8–1	1–5	4–3	3–1	0–1	

Updated to match(es) played on 1943. Source: Diario El Comercio, La Prensa and Crónica.
Legend: Blue = home team win; Yellow = draw; Red = away team win.

== Promotion/relegation play-off ==
The promotion/relegation play-off was a two-legged series played by the team placing 8th in the 1943 Primera División, Centro Iqueño and the 1943 Segunda División champion Telmo Carbajo.

4 June 1944	Telmo Carbajo	1–4	Centro Iqueño	Estadio Nacional, Lima
13:30	53' (pen.)		Quintana; (o.g.); Eduardo Romero 60'

11 June 1944	Centro Iqueño	4–0	Telmo Carbajo	Estadio Nacional, Lima
13:30				Referee: Manuel Ruiz

Centro Iqueño remain in the Primera División.

== Torneo Equipos de Reserva ==
Alongside the Primera División championship, the Reserve Teams Tournament was played, featuring the reserve players of top-flight clubs. However, unlike the 1931–1934 period, this competition did not grant any bonus points to the first team.

=== Standings ===
Pos	Team	Pld	W	D	L	GF	GA	GD	Pts	Qualification or relegation
1	Deportivo Municipal	7	5	2	0	10	0	+10	12	Champions
2	Alianza Lima	0	0	0	0	0	0	0	0	
3	Sport Boys	0	0	0	0	0	0	0	0	
4	Sporting Tabaco	0	0	0	0	0	0	0	0	
5	Atlético Chalaco	0	0	0	0	0	0	0	0	
6	Universitario	0	0	0	0	0	0	0	0	
7	Sucre	0	0	0	0	0	0	0	0	
8	Centro Iqueño	0	0	0	0	0	0	0	0	

=== Results ===
Home \ Away	ALI	CHA	CEN	MUN	SBA	TAB	SUC	UNI
Alianza Lima		—		0–0	—		—	
Atlético Chalaco			—	0–1		—		—
Centro Iqueño	—				—	—		—
Deportivo Municipal			1–0			1–0	0–0	
Sport Boys		—		0–5		—		—
Sporting Tabaco	—						—	—
Sucre		—	—		—			
Universitario	—			0–2			—	

Updated to match(es) played on 1943. Source: Diario El Comercio, La Prensa and Crónica.
Legend: Blue = home team win; Yellow = draw; Red = away team win.

== See also ==
- 1943 Peruvian Segunda División
- 1943 Primera División Regional de Lima y Callao
- 1943 Torneo Relámpago
