= Morro Solar =

Headland in Peru

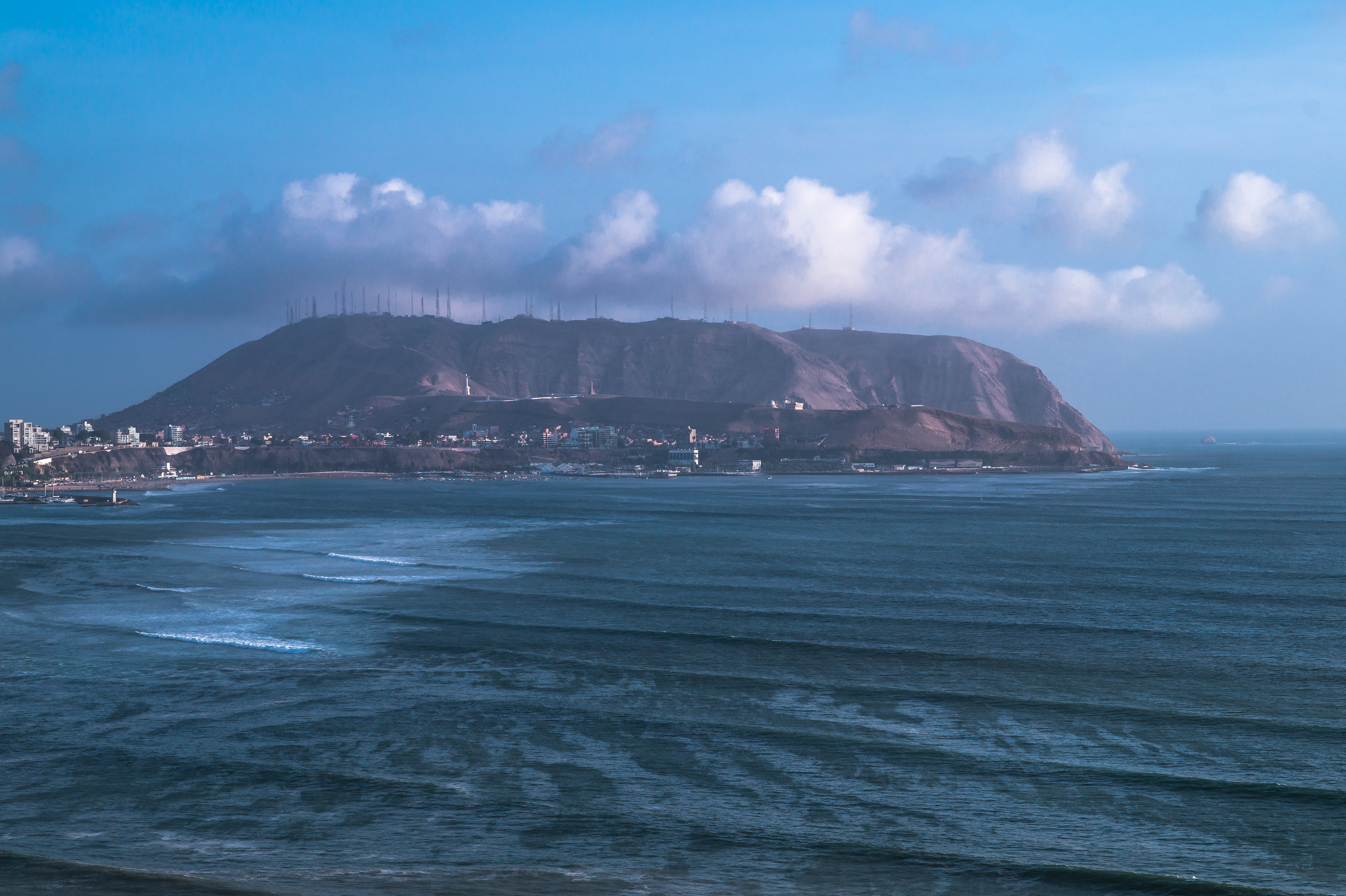
- Antennas above Chorrillos

Highest point
- Elevation: 251 m (823 ft)
- Coordinates: 12°10.92′S 77°01.55′W

Naming
- Etymology: Antonio del Solar

Geography
- Location within Peru
- Location: Chorrillos District, Lima, Peru

Morro Solar is a headland in Chorrillos District, Lima, Peru. Named after Antonio del Solar, a Spanish encomendero and Conquistador, it is located south of the city, and is best known after the 1881 battle that took place there during the War of the Pacific. Its geological formations are rich in silver which is extracted by several mining companies.

The Morro is the site a number of landmarks, including José Castro Mendivil Digital Planetarium, the Monument to the Unknown Soldier, the Pope's Cross, and the Virgen del Morro. The area where the 1881 battle took place was declared a Historical Intangible Zone in 1986.

== Geography ==
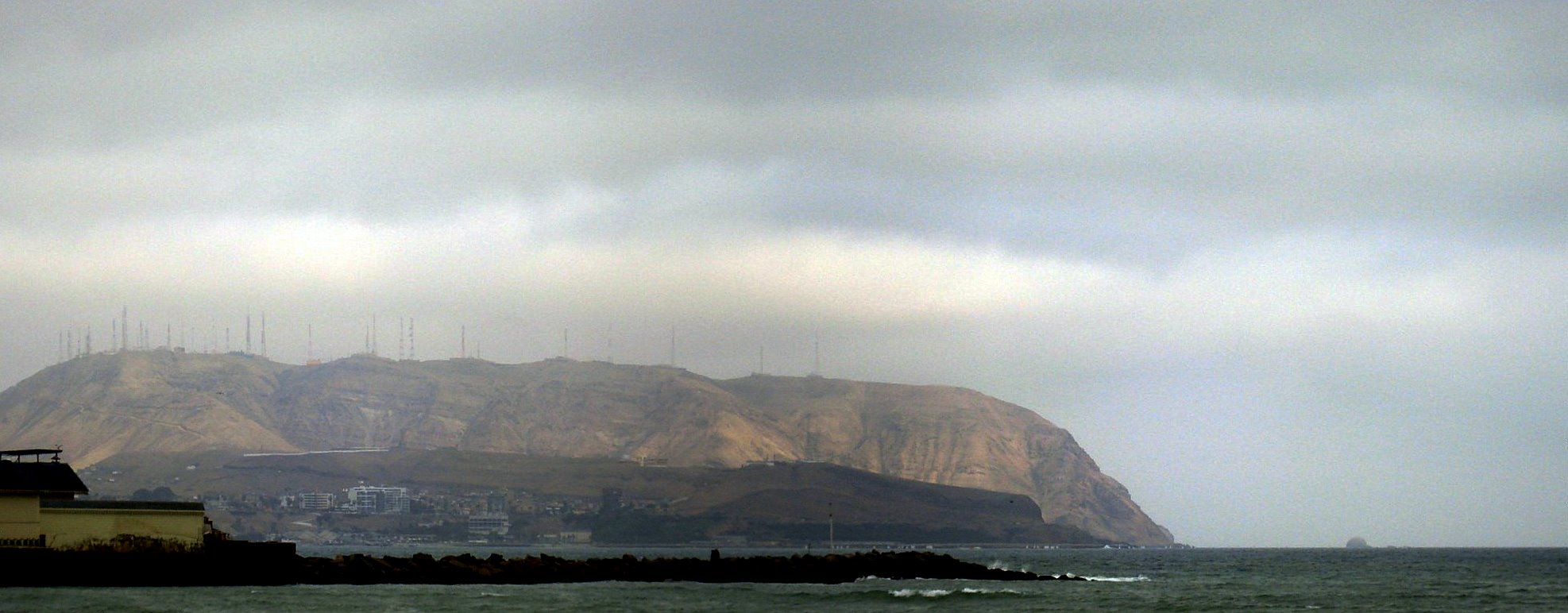
Morro Solar. Lima, Peru.

Morro Solar, a cluster of hills, is roughly 251 metres (823 ft) in elevation. It lies near Chorrillos, a southern suburb of Lima, occupying an area of 7.48 square kilometres (2.89 sq mi). Alexander George Findlay described it as "a remarkable cluster of hills, standing on a sandy plain; when seen from the southward it has the appearance of an island in the shape of a quoin, sloping to the westward, and falling very abruptly in-shore; on its sea face, however, it terminates in a steep cliff, with a sandy bay on each side." The sandy shore between Morro Solar and Lurin is known as Conchan Beach. The southwest point of Morro Solar is formed by the Solar Point, located 10 miles (16 km) from San Francisco Island and 10 miles (16 km) to the southwest of Callao. Its sea face terminates in a steep cliff at Codo Point with a sandy bay on each side. The northern side of Morro Solar is the Chorillos Bay which was used in the 1860s for anchoring of ships only in exceptional circumstances as the bottom of the sea consisted of hard sand, clay stones and boulders, which was upsetting the stability of the ships. The summit of the hill range provides scenic views of the Bay of Lima, the city of Lima and South Spas.

== Geology ==
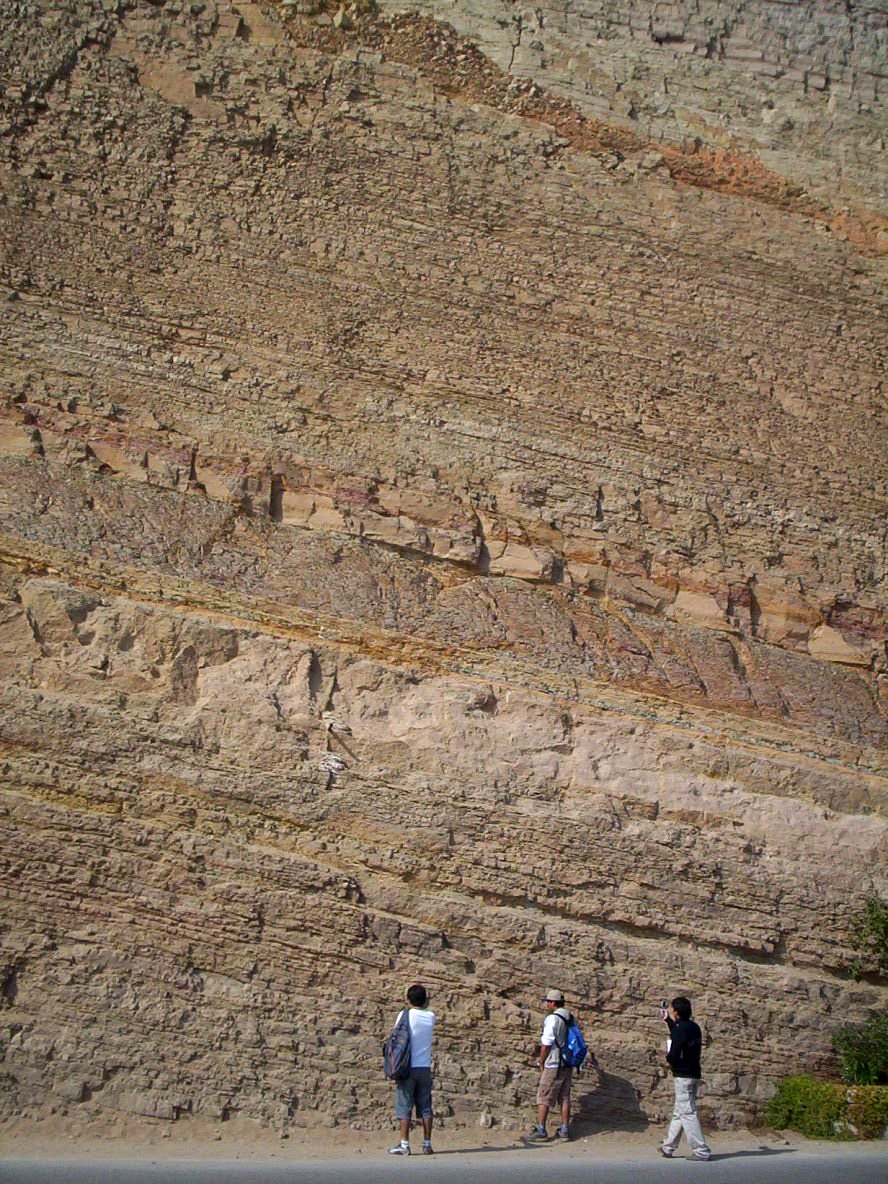
Geological stratification of sedimentary formation, about 140 million years old.

The Morro Solar is part of the very strange topography of Lima which evolved as a result of geological readjustments. It resulted from high sea winds which shaped the rocky formations in the form of a hollow ring. The geological formation of these hills consists primarily of sedimentary outcrops (shallow marine sedimentary facies) and also of the Andean spurs located North and South of the city. The sedimentary sequence has been mapped with appropriate notes on directions and dips of the strata, faults and dykes and the interpreting geological events. The lithology of rock and other features such as oxidation, fracturing and mineralization have been recorded. The mapping has indicated three terraces with a substantial amount of boulders, at altitudes of 110 m (360 ft), 85 m (279 ft) and near the coast, from the Quaternary Period. Quartzites, shales and sandstones from the Cretaceous and Lower Cretaceous have been reported.

Dykes have outcrops of trachytic andesite, dacite and rhyodacite. One of the faults in the dykes runs north to south, another east to west, in the sedimentary rocks.

=== Mining ===
Peru has been a leading silver-producing nation (since 2008, the production was 3680 t). Silver from a newly discovered vein in Morro Solar, reported to be of high grade, is to be extracted at the Morococha mines by the Pan American Silver Corporation. According to the explorations already carried out in 2008, the Morro Solar area is reported to have silver resources of 53 million ounces (Moz). Further exploration under the Morococha Exploration programme was in progress, covering a silver-bearing vein with a continuous length of 2.5 km along a strike.

== History ==
The hill is named after Antonio del Solar (1509–1558), an encomendero and Conquistador. Originally known as the Morro del Solar, it lost its preposition over time. During the War of the Pacific, Morro Solar was the scene of Battle of San Juan and Chorrillos. Historical remains of uniforms and weapons have been found here and several forts were built in the vicinity. There are now monuments to the fighters; prominent among them is the "Monument to the Unknown Soldier". The new wild potato species, S. neoweberbaueri, collected by Augusto Weberbauer on Morro Solar, was named by Ludwig Wittmack in 1914.

A new statue of the "Christ of the Pacific" was proposed to be installed in Lima and there was controversy as to its chosen location which was earlier approved. According to the controversy raised by the Mayor of Lima, the statue would interfere with the scenic view of the Morro Solar, a heritage monument, and hence should be shifted to some other location. The statue was privately funded by Alan García, president of Peru until 2011. The statue was formally consecrated by Cardinal Juan Luis Cipriani on the top of Morro Solar in 2011 when Pope Benedict XVI sent a message of greetings and blessings to the people of Peru. It contains 26 lights of different colours that are illuminated at night.

The hill is the site of several illegal settlements built by squatters, some of which have been removed, while others remain. These settlements have threatened the hill's existing remains from the war and its pre-Columbian history, as they have been built on the hill's vulnerable areas.

== Landmarks ==
The Morro is the site of several landmarks. In addition to them, the hills surrounding it contain antennas which rebroadcast TV channels and some radio stations in Lima. The transmitting station was installed with a NEC transmitter of 400W with one seg signal with live content provided by America TV.

Name	Notes	Photo
Cristo del Pacífico	The monument is a 37-metre-high (121 ft) statue of Jesus and a gift from a consortium of Brazilian companies to the city of Lima, under former President Alan García, and described as a parting gift to the nation on occasion of his leaving office after the 2011 presidential election. It was inspired by the Christ the Redeemer statue in Rio de Janeiro.	
José Castro Mendivil Digital Planetarium	A museum, planetarium and Peru's first astronomical observation center. It was built and run by the engineer Victor Estremadoyro, after land was donated in 1951. Since 2010, it has had a digital projection system, making it one of the most modern in the country. The museum has exhibits of modern and antique telescopes, meteorological models and pictures, civil rocketry artifacts, along with a variety of items found in the Morro from the Battle of San Juan and Chorrillos. There are also archaeological relics such as aerolites (recovered from Morro Solar) and vestiges of the pre-Inca Ichma culture, fossils of marine fauna, and samples of geological activity related to Morro's rock layers.	
Monument to the Unknown Soldier	The war monument is a stone obelisk with a 22 m (72 ft) tall bronze plaque and is painted in olive green with a photo of a Peruvian soldier carrying the national flag. Bronze plaques on the sides of the base along the path leading to the site are set in low reliefs which give the allegorical narration of Peruvian defence against Chilean troops in the battles of San Juan and Miraflores. Another monument stands to Miguel Iglesias, a national hero of Peru.	
Pope's Cross	The Cruz del Papa is a large illuminated cross built with what had been pylons destroyed during the Internal conflict in Peru. It was designed as a welcome gesture for the visit of Pope John Paul II to Peru. The cross lights up at night and can be seen from long distances. It was demolished in 2007 due to safety concerns, rebuilt in December of the same year and inaugurated on February of the following year.	
Virgen del Morro	The statue and a shrine dedicated to the Virgin Mary are located near the cross.	

== See also ==
- Parque Reducto No. 2
- Parque Reducto No. 5
