= Fernando Martinuzzi =

Argentine-Italian footballer

Personal information
- Full name: Fernando Martinuzzi
- Date of birth: 6 January 1980 (age 46)
- Place of birth: Avellaneda, Argentina
- Height: 1.87 m (6 ft 1 1/2 in)
- Position: Goalkeeper

Team information
- Current team: Real Garcilaso
- Number: 1

Fernando Martinuzzi (born 6 January 1980 in Avellaneda, Argentina) is an Argentinian/Italian soccer player. He is the goalkeeper of Real Garcilaso in the Peruvian Primera División.

== Career ==
Debuted in the Primera División Argentina in Club Atlético Lanús on 12 May 2002 against Argentinos Juniors. Later he emigrated to Colombia playing in the Unión Magdalena of the Categoría Primera A.

In 2006, Martinuzzi went to Peru's Sport Boys of Callao in the Peruvian Primera División.

On 21 August 2011 he renewed his contract with Latina playing on the Italian Lega Pro.

Then he went through clubs like Cienciano, Los Caimanes, Club Deportivo Universidad César Vallejo and Real Garcilaso, all of the Peruvian Primera División.

== Clubs ==
Club	Country	Year	Games Played	Goals Against
Club Atlético Lanús	Argentina	2000–2001	0	0
Club Atlético Lanús	Argentina	2001–2002	2	0
Club Atlético Lanús	Argentina	2002–2003	7	4
Club Atlético Lanús	Argentina	2003–2004	8	9
Unión Magdalena	Colombia	2004	19	23
Club Atlético Lanús	Argentina	2005	0	0
Sport Boys	Peru	2006	20	23
Deportivo Municipal	Peru	2007	22	30
Juan Aurich	Peru	2008–2009	52	59
Latina Calcio	Italy	2010–2011	27	15
Latina Calcio	Italy	2011–2012	30	35
Cienciano	Peru	2013	16	16
Los Caimanes	Peru	2014	41	60
Universidad César Vallejo	Peru	2015	6	9
Real Garcilaso	Peru	2016	40	59
Sport Boys	Peru	2006	2	3
Total			292	345

== Youth Honors ==
Title	Club	Country	Year
Torneos Juveniles Bonaerenses	Club Atlético Lanús	Argentina	1997
Torneo 5ta división AFA	Club Atlético Lanús	Argentina	1998
Torneos Juveniles Bonaerenses	Club Atlético Lanús	Argentina	1998
Banlieues Du Monde	Province of Buenos Aires's Team	France	1998

== Professional Honors ==
Title	Club	Country	Year
Copa Interdivisional ABCDiario	Club Atlético Lanús	Argentina	2003
Copa Callao	Deportivo Municipal	Peru	2007
Lega Pro	Latina Calcio	Italy	2011
Torneo del Inca	Universidad César Vallejo	Peru	2015
Peruvian Segunda División	Sport Boys	Peru	2017
