= 1942 Primera División Regional de Lima y Callao =

Primera División Regional de Lima y Callao
- Season: 1942
- Dates: 22 November 1942 – 3 January 1943
- Champions: Ciclista Lima

The 1942 season of the Primera División Regional de Lima y Callao, the second category of Peruvian football, was played by 8 teams. The champions were Ciclista Lima.

== Format ==
- The results of a reserve teams league were added as bonus points.
- The points system was W:3, D:2, L:1, walkover:0.

== Teams ==
=== Team changes ===
Promoted from
1941 Segunda División Regional de Lima y Callao
▲ Ciclista Lima (3rd)
▲ Unión Carbone (4th)
▲ Alianza Tucumán (5th)
▲ Jorge Chávez (6th)
▲ Juventud Perú (7th)
▲ Progresista Apurímac (8th)
▲ Porvenir Miraflores (9th)
▲ Atlético Lusitania (10th)

=== Stadia locations ===
| Team | City |
|---|---|
| Alianza Tucumán | Callao |
| Atlético Lusitania | Barrios Altos, Lima |
| Ciclista Lima | Cercado de Lima |
| Jorge Chávez | Callao |
| Juventud Perú | Barrios Altos, Lima |
| Porvenir Miraflores | Miraflores, Lima |
| Progresista Apurímac | Callao |
| Unión Carbone | Barrios Altos, Lima |

== League table ==
=== Primeros Equipos ===
| Pos | Team | Pld | W | D | L | GF | GA | GD | Pts | Qualification or relegation |
|---|---|---|---|---|---|---|---|---|---|---|
| 1 | Ciclista Lima (C) | 7 | 5 | 2 | 0 | 15 | 5 | +10 | 19 | 1943 Segunda División |
| 2 | Progresista Apurímac | 7 | 5 | 1 | 1 | 15 | 5 | +10 | 18 | 1943 Segunda División |
| 3 | Porvenir Miraflores | 7 | 4 | 1 | 2 | 8 | 5 | +3 | 16 | |
| 4 | Juventud Perú | 7 | 3 | 2 | 2 | 8 | 8 | 0 | 15 | |
| 5 | Alianza Tucumán | 7 | 2 | 2 | 3 | 7 | 10 | −3 | 13 | |
| 6 | Unión Carbone | 7 | 3 | 0 | 4 | 8 | 11 | −3 | 13 | |
| 7 | Atlético Lusitania | 7 | 2 | 0 | 5 | 3 | 8 | −5 | 11 | Liguilla de Promoción |
| 8 | Jorge Chávez | 7 | 0 | 0 | 7 | 2 | 14 | −12 | 6 | Liguilla de Promoción |

(C) Champions

=== Results ===
Teams play each other once, either home or away. All matches were played in Lima and Callao.

| Home \ Away | TUC | LUS | CIC | JCC | JUV | POR | PRO | CAR |
|---|---|---|---|---|---|---|---|---|
| Alianza Tucumán | | 1–0 | 0–2 | 2–0 | | | 1–3 | |
| Atlético Lusitania | | | | | 1–0 | | 0–1 | 1–3 |
| Ciclista Lima | | 1–0 | | 3–0 | | 4–2 | | 2–0 |
| Jorge Chávez | | 0–1 | | | | | 0–4 | 1–2 |
| Juventud Perú | 2–2 | | 1–1 | 2–1 | | 1–0 | | |
| Porvenir Miraflores | 0–0 | 2–0 | | W.O. | | | 2–0 | |
| Progresista Apurímac | | | 2–2 | | 3–0 | | | 2–2 |
| Unión Carbone | 3–1 | | | | 0–2 | 0–2 | | |

Updated to match(es) played on 1942. Source: Diario El Comercio, La Prensa and Crónica.
Legend: Blue = home team win; Yellow = draw; Red = away team win.

=== Tabla Absoluta ===
| Pos | Team | Pld | W | D | L | GF | GA | GD | Pts | Resv. | Total | Qualification or relegation |
|---|---|---|---|---|---|---|---|---|---|---|---|---|
| 1 | Ciclista Lima | 7 | 5 | 2 | 0 | 15 | 5 | +10 | 19 | 2.375 | 21.375 | 1943 Segunda División |
| 2 | Progresista Apurímac | 7 | 5 | 1 | 1 | 15 | 5 | +10 | 18 | 1.625 | 19.625 | 1943 Segunda División |
| 3 | Porvenir Miraflores | 7 | 4 | 1 | 2 | 8 | 5 | +3 | 16 | 1.625 | 17.625 | |
| 4 | Juventud Perú | 7 | 3 | 2 | 2 | 8 | 8 | 0 | 15 | 2.625 | 17.625 | |
| 5 | Alianza Tucumán | 7 | 2 | 2 | 3 | 7 | 10 | −3 | 13 | 2 | 15 | |
| 6 | Unión Carbone | 7 | 3 | 0 | 4 | 8 | 11 | −3 | 13 | 1.5 | 14.5 | |
| 7 | Atlético Lusitania | 7 | 2 | 0 | 5 | 3 | 8 | −5 | 11 | 2.875 | 13.875 | Liguilla de Promoción |
| 8 | Jorge Chávez | 7 | 0 | 0 | 7 | 2 | 14 | −12 | 6 | 0 | 6 | Liguilla de Promoción |

== Liguilla de Promoción ==
The teams that placed 7th and 8th in the 1942 Primera División Regional de Lima y Callao (Atlético Lusitania and Jorge Chávez), together with the teams that placed 1st and 2nd in Serie A (Association Chorrillos and Coronel León Velarde) and Serie B (KDT Nacional and Santiago Rossell) of the 1942 Segunda División Regional de Lima y Callao, took part in the Promotion Playoff (Liguilla de Promoción).

=== Standings ===
| Pos | Team | Pld | W | D | L | GF | GA | GD | Pts | Qualification or relegation | JCC | KDT | ASS | LUS | ROS | COR |
|---|---|---|---|---|---|---|---|---|---|---|---|---|---|---|---|---|
| 1 | Jorge Chávez | 5 | 3 | 2 | 0 | 8 | 5 | +3 | 13 | 1943 Primera Regional de Lima y Callao | | | 2–0 | 3–2 | W.O. | |
| 2 | KDT Nacional | 5 | 3 | 2 | 0 | 8 | 5 | +3 | 13 | 1943 Primera Regional de Lima y Callao | 3–3 | | 0–0 | | 2–0 | |
| 3 | Association Chorrillos | 5 | 3 | 1 | 1 | 6 | 4 | +2 | 12 | 1943 Primera Regional de Lima y Callao | | | | | 2–0 | 1–0 |
| 4 | Atlético Lusitania | 5 | 2 | 1 | 2 | 11 | 9 | +2 | 10 | 1943 Primera Regional de Lima y Callao | | 2–2 | 2–3 | | | 2–0 |
| 5 | Santiago Rossell (R) | 5 | 1 | 0 | 4 | 5 | 7 | −2 | 7 | 1943 Segunda Regional de Lima y Callao | | | | 1–3 | | 4–1 |
| 6 | Coronel Leon Velarde (R) | 5 | 0 | 1 | 4 | 1 | 9 | −8 | 6 | 1943 Segunda Regional de Lima y Callao | 0–0 | 0–2 | | | | |

Legend: Blue = home team win; Yellow = draw; Red = away team win.
(R) Relegated

== See also ==
- 1942 Peruvian Primera División
