= Lurín =

Lurín may refer to the following places in Lima Province, Peru:

- Roman Catholic Diocese of Lurín
- Lurín District
- Lurín River

== See also ==
- Lurin, a quartier of Saint Barthélemy in the Caribbean
