= José Castro Mendivil Digital Planetarium =

Planetarium in Peru

Coordinates: 12.16929°S 77.03348°W

- Planetario Digital José Castro Mendivil
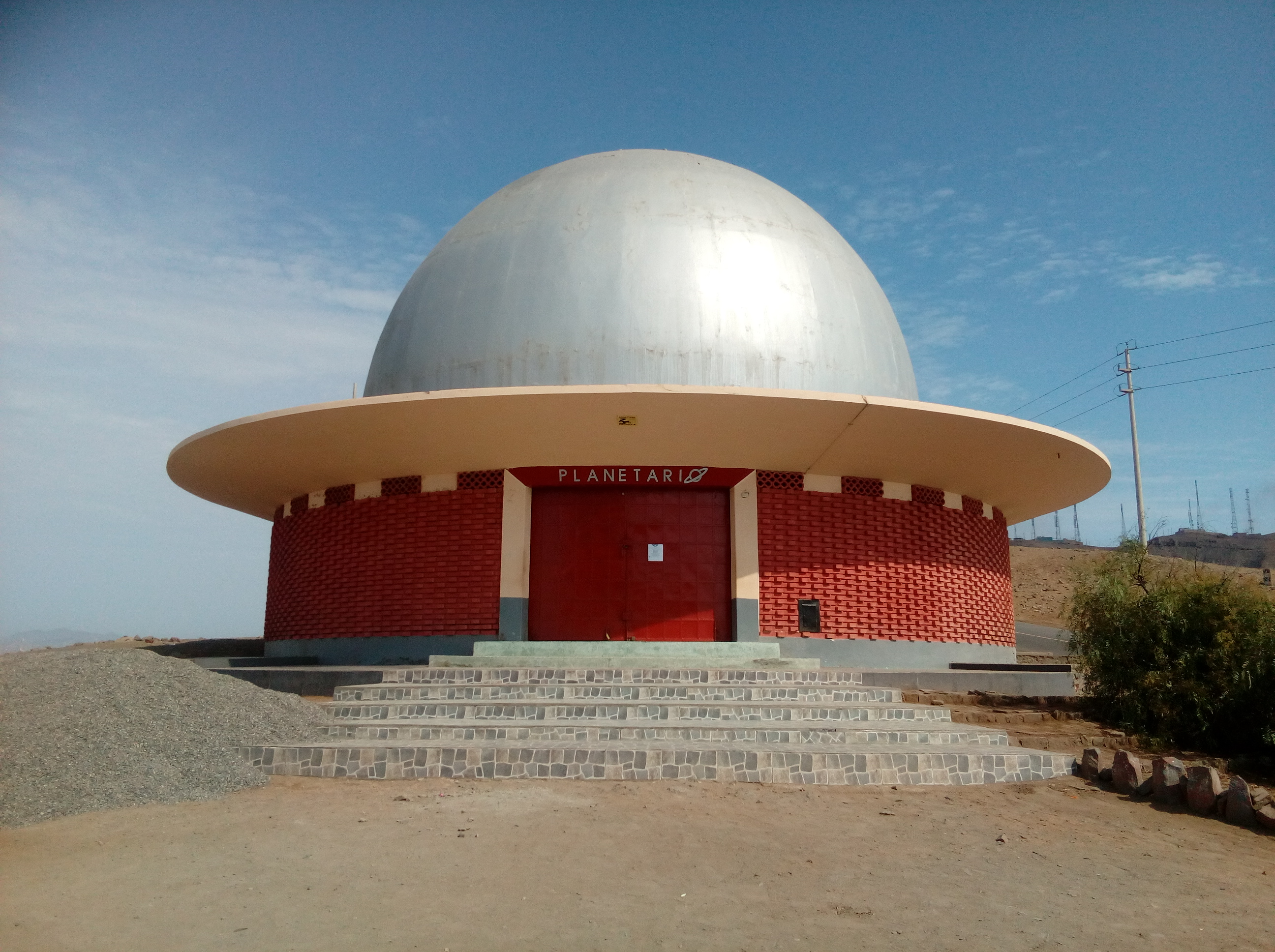
- The planetarium within the complex
- Established: 23 April 1960
- Location: Morro Solar
- Type: Planetarium
- Founder: Peruvian Astronomy Association
- Curator: Javier Ramírez
- Website: www.apa.com.pe

José Castro Mendivil Digital Planetarium (Spanish: Planetario Digital José Castro Mendivil), also known simply as the Morro Solar Planetarium (Spanish: Planetario del Morro Solar), is a planetarium and site museum dedicated to astronomy in the Morro Solar of Chorrillos District, Lima, Peru. It is named after the engineer who designed it.

It is administered by the Peruvian Astronomy Association (Spanish: Asociación Peruana de Astronomía, APA), founded on August 15, 1946, and then headed by Peruvian astronomer Víctor Estremadoyro Robles. Besides its 360° theatre, it also features remnants of the Battle of San Juan during the War of the Pacific.

== History ==
The first stone was placed at 1 p.m. by Peruvian astronomer and head of the Peruvian Astronomy Association Víctor Estremadoyro Robles, during a ceremony that took place on February 19, 1954, three years after the Peruvian government granted the terrain for the building's construction. It was formally inaugurated on April 23, 1960.

In 1968, construction of an observatory began, with the Astronomical League of the United States donating a Schmidt–Cassegrain telescope. The building's iron dome was designed by the industrial service of the Peruvian Navy, with the entire complex having a cost of US$62,800.

In 2013, a digital projector was added to the planetarium.

In 2018, the APA donated three bronze plaques to replace the ones stolen at the nearby Monument to the Unknown Soldier.

== See also ==
- Morro Solar
