= Andrés Avelino Cáceres Museum =

Museum in Lima, Peru

Coordinates: 12°07′36″S 77°01′19″W

- Museo de Sitio Andrés Avelino Cáceres
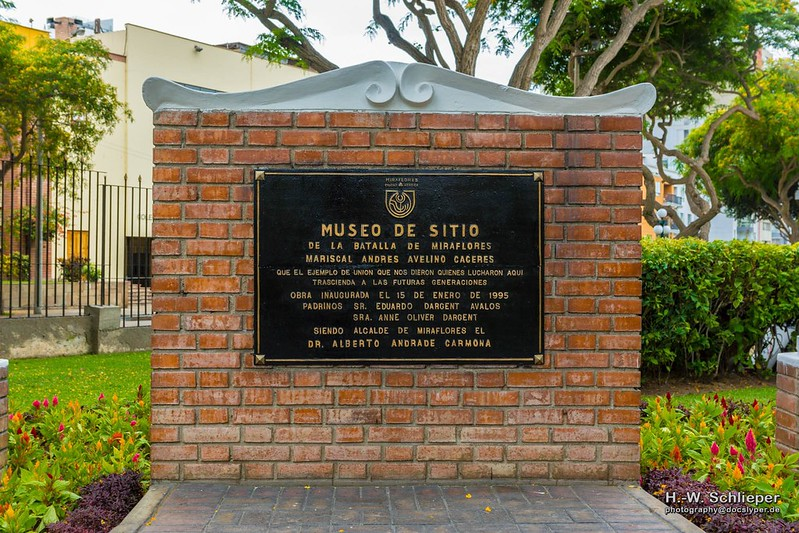
- Entrance plaque
- Established: 10 November 1986
- Location: Parque Reducto № 2, Lima
- Type: War museum

Andrés Avelino Cáceres Museum (Spanish: Museo de Sitio Andrés Avelino Cáceres) is a war museum located at a building formerly used as a train station at the Parque Reducto № 2 in Miraflores District, Lima, Peru. It is named after Marshal Andrés Avelino Cáceres, who participated at the park's defense during the War of the Pacific, then used as a redoubt.

== History ==
The museum was inaugurated on November 10, 1986, as part of the sesquicentennial celebrations of Andrés Avelino Cáceres's birth. As part of an agreement between the district's municipality and the Peruvian Army, a number of items were moved to the new museum's premises (from both the Peruvian and Chilean armies), as well as some personal items that once belonged to Cáceres.

== Gallery ==
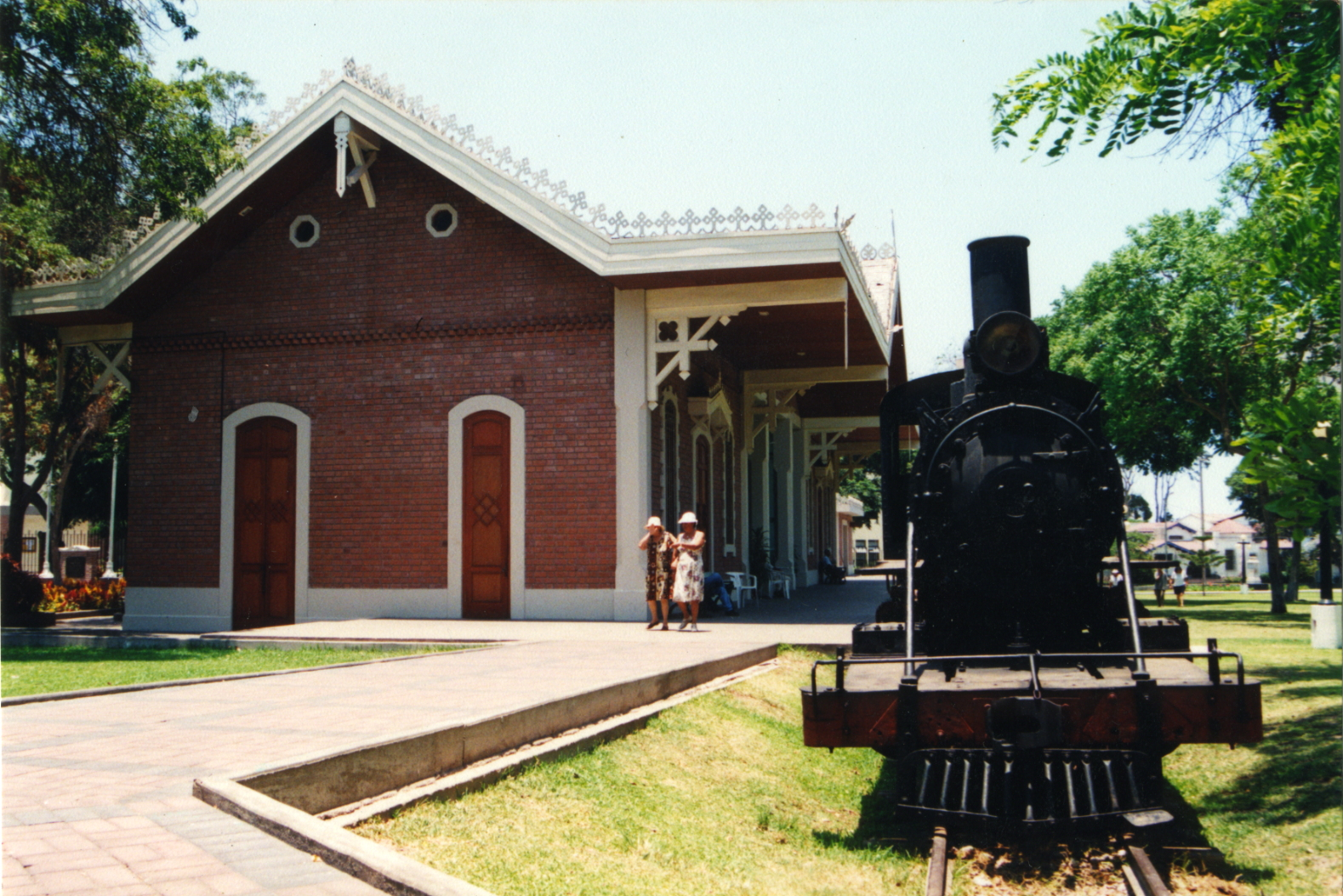
Locomotive outside the museum

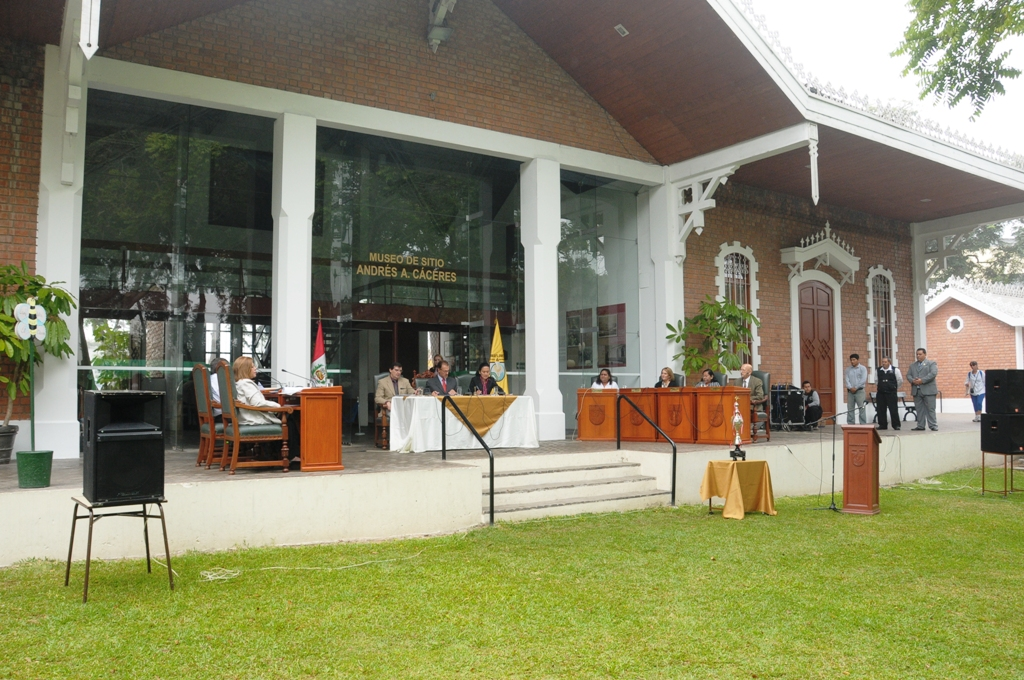
Municipal meeting at its entrance.

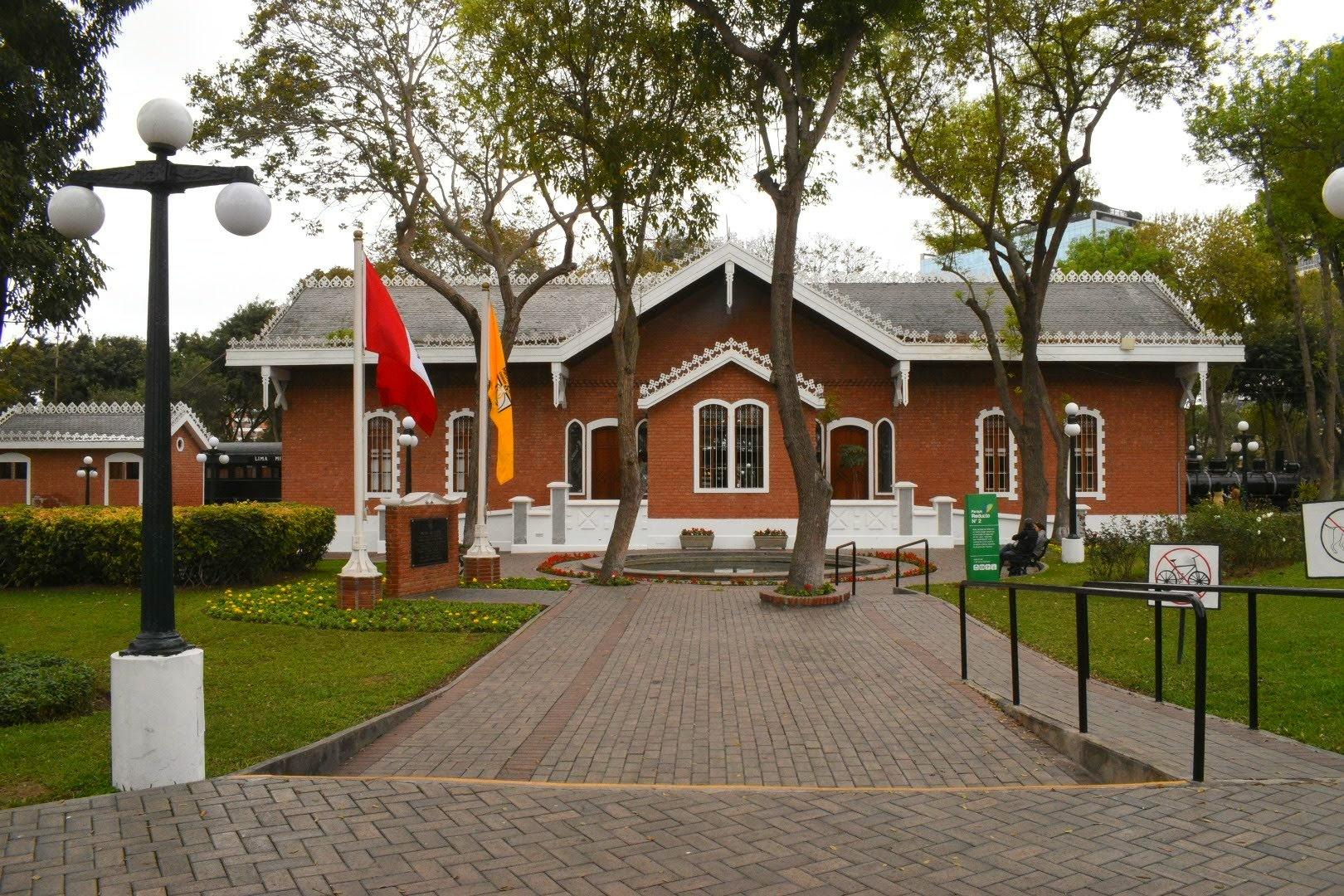
Front view of the museum.

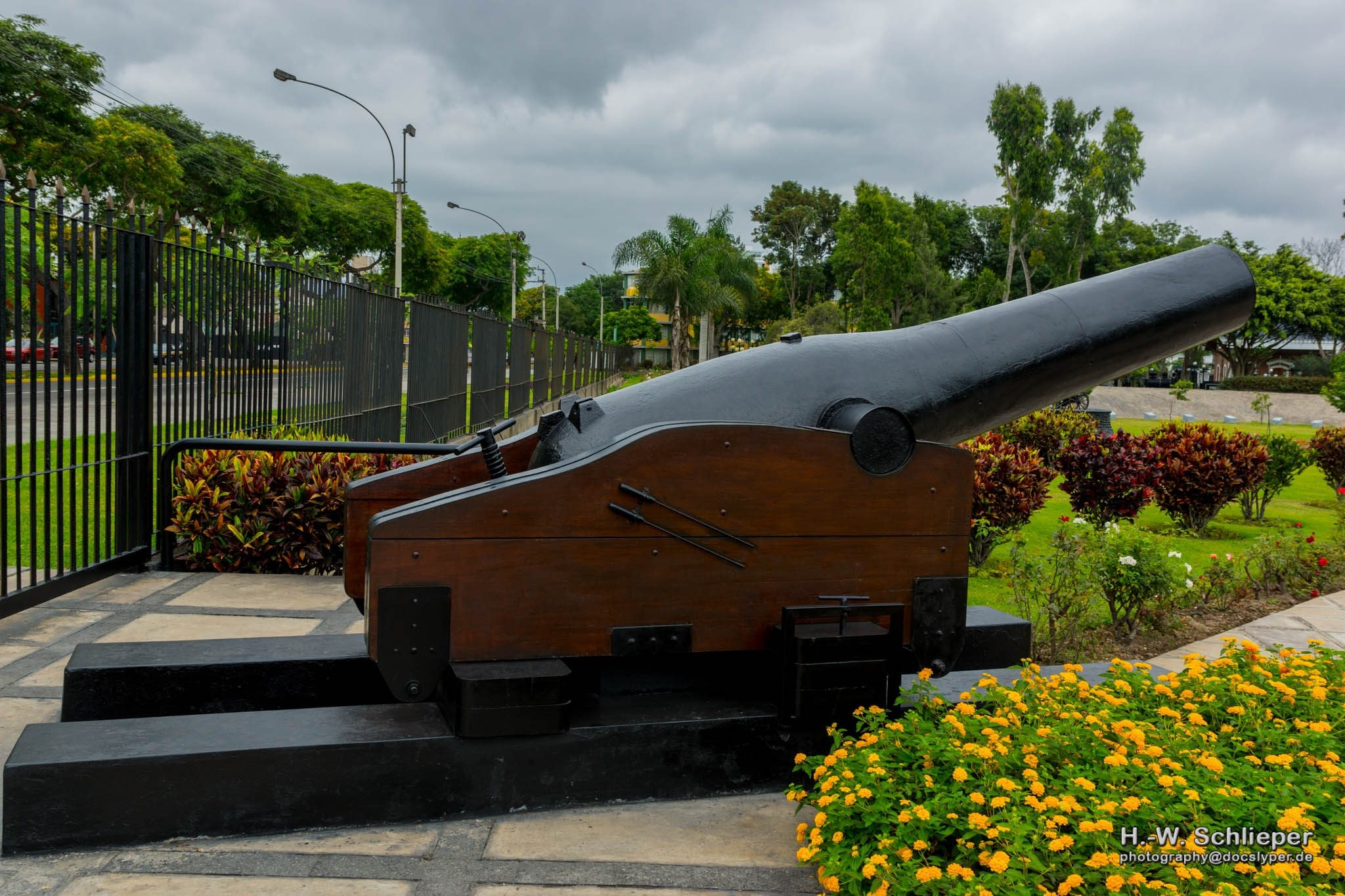
Cannon at its entrance.

== See also ==
- Parque Reducto № 2
- Andrés Avelino Cáceres
