= 1944 Peruvian Primera División =

Peruvian Primera División
- Season: 1944
- Dates: 15 July 1944 – 22 October 1944
- Champions: Sucre (1st title)
- Runner up: Deportivo Municipal
- Relegated: none
- Matches: 56
- Goals: 235 (4.2 per match)
- Top goalscorer: Víctor Espinoza (16 goals)

The 1944 season of the Peruvian Primera División, the top category of Peruvian football, was played by 8 teams. The national champions were Sucre.

No team was promoted or relegated.

== Teams ==
Team	City	Mannager
Alianza Lima	La Victoria, Lima	(Uruguay) Julio Manisse
Atlético Chalaco	Callao	(Peru) José Arana
Centro Iqueño	Cercado de Lima	(Peru) Lizardo Rodríguez Nue
Deportivo Municipal	Cercado de Lima	(Peru) Juan Valdivieso
Sport Boys	Callao	(Peru) Máximo Lobatón
Sporting Tabaco	Rímac, Lima	
Sucre	La Victoria, Lima	(Peru) Alfonso Huapaya
Universitario	Cercado de Lima	(Peru) Arturo Fernández

== League table ==
=== Standings ===
Pos	Team	Pld	W	D	L	GF	GA	GD	Pts	Qualification or relegation
1	Sucre (C)	14	10	1	3	40	25	+15	21	Champions
2	Deportivo Municipal	14	7	2	5	37	27	+10	16	
3	Universitario	14	6	3	5	32	29	+3	15	
4	Alianza Lima	14	6	3	5	26	25	+1	15	
5	Sport Boys	14	5	3	6	29	31	−2	13	
6	Atlético Chalaco	14	4	4	6	29	29	0	12	
7	Centro Iqueño	14	4	4	6	24	28	−4	12	
8	Sporting Tabaco (O)	14	2	4	8	18	41	−23	8	Promotion/relegation play-off

(C) Champions; (O) Play-off winners

== Results ==
Home \ Away	ALI	CHA	IQU	MUN	SBA	TAB	SUC	UNI
Alianza Lima		1–1	1–1	5–4	1–3	4–0	3–1	0–1
Atlético Chalaco	2–3		2–2	2–5	4–1	1–1	0–4	1–2
Centro Iqueño	3–0	0–3		1–2	0–2	1–1	3–2	1–0
Deportivo Municipal	0–1	4–2	1–1		3–1	2–1	1–2	5–3
Sport Boys	1–3	1–2	2–4	4–3		5–3	4–1	2–2
Sporting Tabaco	3–3	0–5	2–0	0–4	1–1		1–2	0–3
Sucre	2–0	4–3	5–4	1–1	2–0	7–1		5–4
Universitario	3–1	1–1	5–3	3–2	2–2	3–4	0–2	

Updated to match(es) played on 1944. Source: Diario El Comercio, La Prensa and Crónica.
Legend: Blue = home team win; Yellow = draw; Red = away team win.

== Promotion/relegation play-off ==
The promotion/relegation play-off was a two-legged series played by the team placing 8th in the 1944 Primera División, Sporting Tabaco and the 1944 Segunda División champion Ciclista Lima.

22 July 1945	Ciclista Lima	0–2	Sporting Tabaco	Estadio Nacional, Lima
13:15			Edgardo Mabama; Alfredo Mosquera

30 July 1945	Sporting Tabaco	4–2	Ciclista Lima	Estadio Nacional, Lima

Sporting Tabaco remain in the Primera División.

== Top scorers ==
Rank	Player	Club	Goals
1	(Peru) Víctor Espinoza	Universitario	16
2	(Peru) Carlos Ramos	Sucre	15
3	(Peru) Julio Ayllón	Sucre	10
4	(Peru) Teodoro Fernández	Universitario	9
5	(Peru) Adelfo Magallanes	Alianza Lima	8

== See also ==
- 1944 Peruvian Segunda División
- 1944 Torneo Relámpago
- 1944 Primera División Regional de Lima y Callao
