= 1944 Peruvian Segunda División =

Peruvian Segunda División
- Season: 1944
- Dates: 8 December 1944 – 3 June 1945
- Champions: Ciclista Lima
- Runner up: Telmo Carbajo
- Matches: 20
- Goals: 85 (4.25 per match)

The 1944 Peruvian Segunda División, the second division of Peruvian football (soccer), was played by 5 teams. The tournament winner, Ciclista Lima was promoted to the Promotional Playoff. Atlético Lusitania was promoted to the 1945 Peruvian Segunda División.

== Teams ==
=== Team changes ===
Promoted from
1943 Primera División Regional de Lima y Callao
▲ Jorge Chávez (1st)

=== Stadia and locations ===
Team	City
Ciclista Lima	Cercado de Lima
Jorge Chávez	Callao
Progresista Apurímac	Callao
Santiago Barranco	Barranco, Lima
Telmo Carbajo	Callao

== League table ==
=== Standings ===
Pos	Team	Pld	W	D	L	GF	GA	GD	Pts	Qualification or relegation
1	Ciclista Lima (C)	8	7	0	1	24	7	+17	14	Promotion play-off
2	Telmo Carbajo	8	5	1	2	21	13	+8	11	
3	Santiago Barranco	8	4	1	3	21	13	+8	9	
4	Jorge Chávez	8	3	0	5	15	26	−11	6	
5	Progresista Apurímac	8	0	0	8	4	27	−23	0	

(C) Champions

== Results ==
Home \ Away	CIC	JCC	PRO	SAN	TEL
Ciclista Lima		W.O.	7–0	5–1	3–1
Jorge Chávez	1–5		2–0	3–2	3–5
Progresista Apurímac	W.O.	0–3		0–1	2–5
Santiago Barranco	2–1	9–0	6–2		0–0
Telmo Carbajo	2–3	1–0	3–0	2–0	

Updated to match(es) played on 1944. Source: Diario El Comercio, La Prensa and Crónica.
Legend: Blue = home team win; Yellow = draw; Red = away team win.

== Promotion play-off ==
The promotion/relegation play-off was a two-legged series played by the team placing 8th in the 1944 Primera División, Sporting Tabaco and the 1944 Segunda División champion Ciclista Lima.

22 July 1945	Ciclista Lima	0–2	Sporting Tabaco	Estadio Nacional, Lima
13:15			Edgardo Mabama; Alfredo Mosquera

30 July 1945	Sporting Tabaco	4–2	Ciclista Lima	Estadio Nacional, Lima

Sporting Tabaco remain in the Primera División.

== See also ==
- 1944 Peruvian Primera División
- 1944 Primera División Regional de Lima y Callao
