= 1944 Primera División Regional de Lima y Callao =

Association football season

Primera División Regional de Lima y Callao
- Season: 1944
- Dates: 5 November 1944 – 17 December 1944
- Champions: Atlético Lusitania
- Relegated: Juventud Perú

The 1944 season of the Primera División Regional de Lima y Callao, the third category of Peruvian football, was played by 8 teams. Atlético Lusitania were crowned champions of the tournament and earned promotion to the 1945 Segunda División.

== Format ==
- The points system was W:3, D:2, L:1, walkover:0.

== Teams ==
=== Team changes ===
Promoted to 1944 Segunda División	Promoted from 1943 Segunda División Regional de Lima y Callao	Relegated to 1944 Segunda División Regional de Lima y Callao
▲ Jorge Chávez (1st)	▲ Juventud Gloria (Serie A - 1st) ▲ Unión Callao (Serie B - 1st)	▼ Alianza Tucumán (8th)

=== Stadia locations ===
Team	City
Association Chorrillos	Chorrillos, Lima
Atlético Lusitania	Barrios Altos, Lima
Juventud Gloria	Cercado de Lima
Juventud Perú	Barrios Altos, Lima
KDT Nacional	Callao
Porvenir Miraflores	Miraflores, Lima
Unión Callao	Callao
Unión Carbone	Barrios Altos, Lima

== League table ==
=== Standings ===
Pos	Team	Pld	W	D	L	GF	GA	GD	Pts	Qualification or relegation
1	Atlético Lusitania (C)	7	5	1	1	13	7	+6	18	1945 Segunda División
2	Unión Callao	7	4	3	0	14	3	+11	18	
3	KDT Nacional	7	5	1	1	17	9	+8	18	
4	Association Chorrillos	7	3	1	3	8	7	+1	14	
5	Unión Carbone	7	2	1	4	14	16	−2	12	
6	Juventud Gloria	7	2	1	4	10	15	−5	12	
7	Porvenir Miraflores	7	0	3	4	7	14	−7	10	Liguilla de Promoción
8	Juventud Perú	7	0	3	4	11	23	−12	10	Liguilla de Promoción

(C) Champions

=== Results ===
Teams play each other once, either home or away. All matches were played in Lima and Callao.

Home \ Away	ACH	LUS	GLO	KDT	JUV	POR	UNI	CAR
Association Chorrillos		3–0			0–0	1–0		
Atlético Lusitania				1–0		2–0	1–1	
Juventud Gloria	2–0	1–3					0–2	1–4
KDT Nacional	3–1		3–2		4–3	4–1		
Juventud Perú		0–3	2–2				0–5	3–6
Porvenir Miraflores			1–2		3–3			1–1
Unión Callao	1–0			1–1		1–1		3–0
Unión Carbone	1–3	1–2		0–2				

Updated to match(es) played on 1944. Source: Diario El Comercio, La Prensa and Crónica.
Legend: Blue = home team win; Yellow = draw; Red = away team win.

== Liguilla de Promoción ==
The teams that placed 7th and 8th in the 1944 Primera División Regional de Lima y Callao (Porvenir Miraflores and Juventud Perú), together with the teams that placed 1st in Serie A (Defensor Arica) and Serie B (San Lorenzo de Almagro) of the 1944 Segunda División Regional de Lima y Callao, took part in the Promotion Playoff (Liguilla de Promoción).

=== Standings ===
Pos	Team	Pld	W	D	L	GF	GA	GD	Pts	Qualification or relegation	ARI	POR	SAN	JUV
1	Defensor Arica	3	3	0	0	8	2	+6	9	1945 Primera División Regional de Lima y Callao				3–2
2	Porvenir Miraflores	3	1	1	1	4	5	−1	6	1945 Primera División Regional de Lima y Callao	0–2			
3	San Lorenzo de Almagro	3	0	2	1	2	5	−3	5	1945 Primera División Regional de Lima y Callao	0–3	1–1		
4	Juventud Perú	3	0	1	2	5	7	−2	4	1945 Segunda Regional de Lima y Callao		2–3	1–1	

Legend: Blue = home team win; Yellow = draw; Red = away team win.

== See also ==
- 1944 Peruvian Primera División
- 1944 Peruvian Segunda División
