= Ramón Miranda Ampuero =

Peruvian politician and general (born 1926)

Ramón Humberto Miranda Ampuero (born October 28, 1926) is a Peruvian former general officer and politician who served as the Minister of Education.

== Life and career ==
Miranda Ampuero was born in Chorrillos District, Lima, Peru, to Froylan Miranda Barreto and Manuela Ampuero Corrales. He studied at the Colegio Claretiano in Magdalena del Mar District. On March 13, 1943, he was accepted into the Military Academy of Chorrillos where he graduated with the rank of Officer on January 1, 1947.

In 1951, he married Maria Eyzaguirre Tizon, and has six sons.

He studied in the Superior War Academy of Military Strategy (Escuela Superior de Guerra de Estrategia Militar) and the Center for Advanced Military Studies (CAEM) in Peru; the Institute for Antiaircraft Artillery and Countersubversive War in Panamá; and the Command and General Staff College in Fort Leavenworth, Kansas.

Miranda Ampuero was a member of the Committee for the Assessment of the Presidency of the Republic of Peru (1971–1974), President of the Peruvian Telephone Directory Agency (1974) and Minister of Education of Peru (1975–1976). He was a functionary of the Peruvian Institute of Infantry Development (1982–1992).

He was awarded with the Military Order Ayacucho in the Official Grade, with the Peruvian Cross for Military Merit (Grand Cross), with the Order of the Sun, and he was recognized by the Peruvian Air Force. He also published "The Conflicts of Integration".

During his tenure as Minister of Education, he instituted the Escuelas Superiores de Educación Profesional ESEPS (Advanced Institutes of Professional Education) and intensified the Educational Reform program in Peru.

== See also ==
- Ministry of Education (Peru)
