= Copa Callao =

- Founded: 2007
- Region: South America (CONMEBOL)
- Teams: 4
- Current champions: Deportivo Municipal
- Most championships: Deportivo Municipal (1 title)

The Copa Callao, was an exhibition football competition hosted in Callao, Peru in the 2007. It features four Peruvian Primera División teams: Callao's major team Sport Boys as host, and guest teams, Deportivo Municipal, Universidad San Martín and Cienciano. All matches are played at the Estadio Miguel Grau in Callao,

== Champions ==
Season	Champion (title count)	Runner-up	Third Place	Fourth Place
2007	Deportivo Municipal (1)	Cienciano	Universidad San Martín	Sport Boys

== Titles by club ==
Club	Winners	Winning Seasons
Deportivo Municipal	1	2007

== 2007 Copa Callao ==
=== First Round ===
26 January 2007	Cienciano	2–2 (5–4 p)	Universidad San Martín	Estadio Miguel Grau, Callao
	Miguel Mostto 27' 71'		Mario Leguizamón 44'; Pedro García 61'	Referee: Alejandro Villanueva

26 January 2007	Sport Boys	1–2	Deportivo Municipal	Estadio Miguel Grau, Callao
	Omar Zegarra		Renzo Sheput 26'; Nick Montalva

=== Third Place ===
28 January 2007	Sport Boys	0–1	Universidad San Martín	Estadio Miguel Grau, Callao
			Gastón Cellerino 76'

=== Final ===
28 January 2007	Cienciano	0–0 (2–3 p)	Deportivo Municipal	Estadio Miguel Grau, Callao
				Referee: Miguel Magallanes
