= Deportivo Municipal =

Association football club in Peru

- Full name: Club Centro Deportivo Municipal
- Nicknames: La Academia (The Academy); Muni; Echa Muni; Los Ediles; La Franja; El Cuadro de la Comuna
- Founded: July 27, 1935; 91 years ago
- Ground: Estadio Municipal de Chorrillos
- Capacity: 15,000
- Chairman: Omar Urteaga Cabrera
- Manager: Roberto Arrelucea
- League: Copa Perú
- 2026: Departmental Stage
- Website: clubdeportivomunicipal.pe
Home colours	Away colours	Third colours

Club Centro Deportivo Municipal, commonly known as Deportivo Municipal, is a Peruvian football club based in Lima, Peru. They are among Peru's most recognizable clubs and enjoy considerable popularity. The bulk of their success came a few years after the club was founded in 1935. The club was a top-flight contender during this period and won four Primera División titles. The club suffered relegation three times in their history: 1967, 2000, and 2007. They have also been champions of the Segunda División on three occasions: 1968, 2006, and 2014, granting them promotion to the first division. They currently compete in the Copa Perú.

Deportivo Municipal was one of the first Peruvian clubs to participate in a South American international football competition. In 1948, they were invited to the South American Championship of Champions and finished fourth where clubs from seven of the then nine CONMEBOL football associations participated.

== History ==
=== Beginnings ===
Club Centro Deportivo Municipal was founded upon the initiative of three municipal directors of Lima, who intended to have a football team representing the municipality of the city. Thus Círculo Deportivo Municipal was formed, which in 1934 merged with another team to create Centro Deportivo Municipal, participating in the promotion tournament in 1935.

The club was officially founded on 27 July 1935 in the Municipality of Lima. After finishing second in the promotion tournament, the team won the right to play in the Primera División in 1936, and obtained its first national title in 1938.

=== Golden era ===
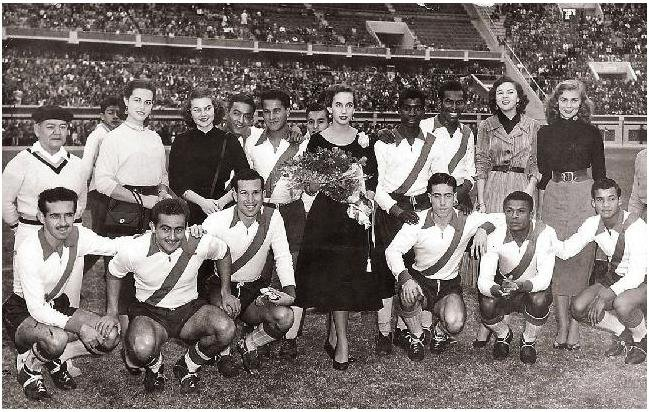
Deportivo Municipal squad that won the 1950 Championship

Deportivo Municipal's win in 1938 began the clubs golden era. In the 1940 Peruvian Primera División, the title was in contention between Deportivo Municipal, Universitario, Alianza Lima, and Atlético Chalaco. Deportivo Municipal faced Atlético Chalaco in the final match where a victory was needed to secure the title. Municipal gave Atlético Chalaco a full-throttle performance with goals from Magán and Quiñónez, then Cabrejos and Roberto Drago, sealed the 4–1 victory, securing them the title for the second time.

After obtaining their second title, Deportivo Municipal gave a masterclass in Peruvian football by achieving two victories against the famous Boca Juniors of Argentina. During this era, the trio (Roberto Drago, Luis Guzmán and Máximo Mosquera) that would become significant in the history of Peruvian football was born, the "Tres Gatitos" (Three Kittens), who should have actually been four due to the magnificent contribution of Segundo Castillo. Municipal won their third national title in 1943 and fourth in 1950. They were runner-ups in 1941, 1942, 1944, 1945, 1946, 1947, and 1951.

=== Relegation and return to success ===
Deportivo Municipal was relegated in 1967, and promoted again in 1968, obtaining their first Second Division title. During this time, the historic player Hugo Sotil arrived to the senior team after being in the Deportivo Municipal youth clubs, helping Municipal return to the First Division. Hugo Sotil became one of Deportivo Municipal's most historic players.

In the following years, Municipal alternated between good and bad seasons. Good ones, like 1981, when they were a very compact and devastating team, finishing runner-up and winning the intermediate championship in 1993. And bad ones, like 1998 and 1999, when they were at risk of being relegated to the league on both occasions until shortly before the end of the championship.

After achieving a runner-up finish in the 1981 season, they played a Copa Libertadores play off against giants Universitario de Deportes. Municipal won the play off and qualified for the 1982 Copa Libertadores for the first time. They were eliminated in the Group Stage with zero points and only 3 goals scored.

=== Between the First and Second Division ===
The club stayed in the top category until 2000, when it ended last in the season. The team was relegated to the Segunda División, where it played until 2006, when promotion was achieved by winning the title with 45 points in 22 matches. They were relegated again in 2007 after a troublesome season with failing to pay its players for several months.

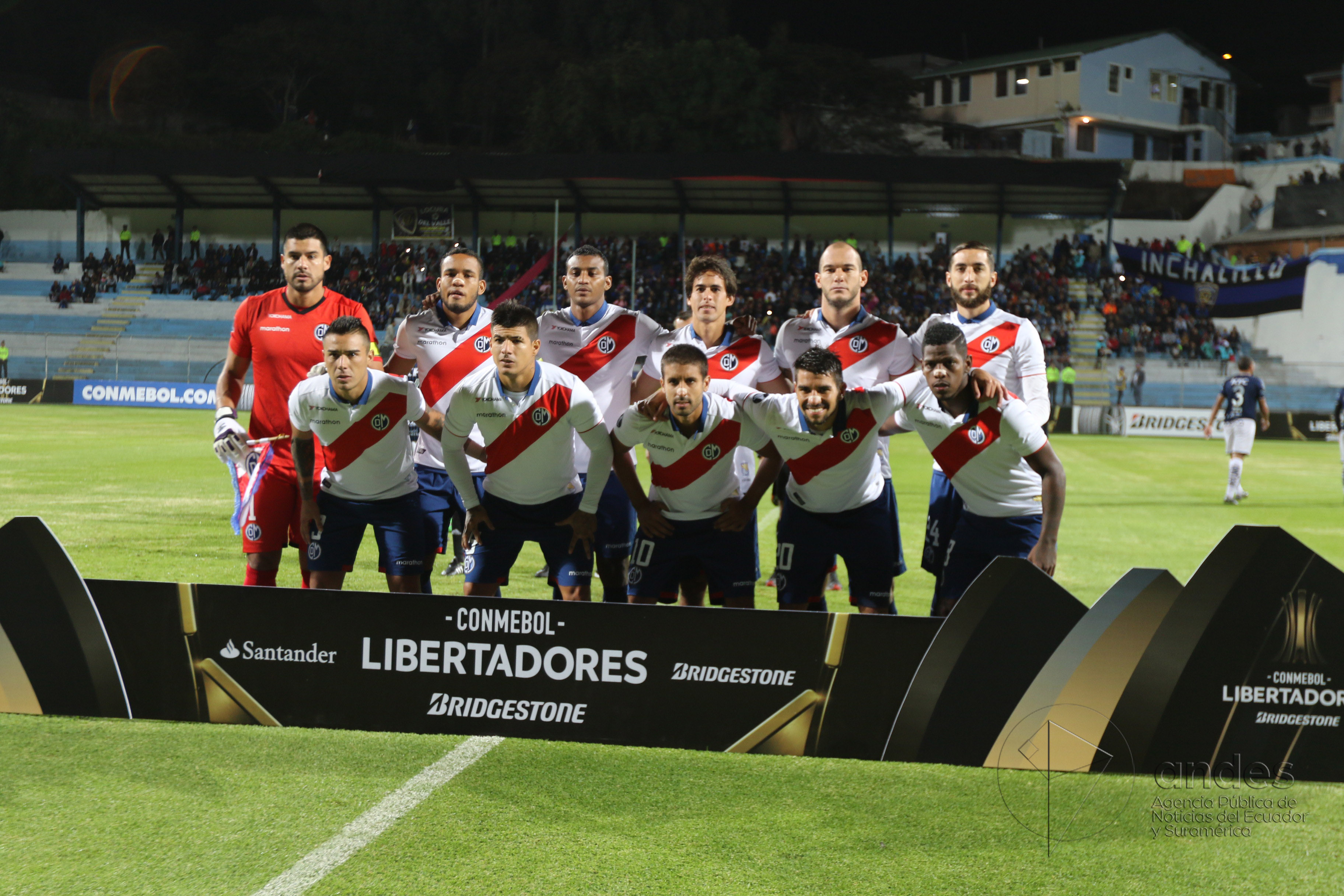
Deportivo Municipal squad before their debut in the 2017 Copa Libertadores

In the 2011 Torneo Intermedio, the club was eliminated by José Gálvez in the quarter-finals. It reached the national stage of the 2012 Copa Perú and was invited to play in the Segunda División once again.

On 2014, the club gained promotion to the Primera División Peruana for the first time in 7 years after beating Unión Huaral to win the 2014 Peruvian Segunda División. They qualified for the 2016 and 2019 Copa Sudamericana for the first time but were eliminated by Atlético Nacional and Club Atlético Colón, respectively. Municipal then returned to the Copa Libertadores after 35 years in 2017, but were eliminated by Independiente del Valle in the first qualifying stage. They maintained an average performance in mid-table, fighting for the title numerous times. However, they were relegated in 2023. Municipal's relegation was to blame on the clubs financial situation and defects. In their first season back in the Second Division (now called Liga 2), they advanced to the Group Stage, but were suspended by the Peruvian Football Federation for failing to pay its license. They were deducted 4 points and later disqualified, being relegated to the Liga 3.

=== Liga 3 ===
In the inaugural 2025 season of the newly created Liga 3, Club Centro Deportivo Municipal competed in Group 2, where it had an unremarkable campaign and finished in eighth place.

On March 27 2026, Deportivo Municipal was officially relegated from the professional ranks (Liga 3) to the Copa Perú as of March 2026 due to severe, unresolved financial problems. Likewise, on May 7, 2026, Liga Nacional de Fútbol Aficionado ratified the decision and confirmed the relegation of Club Centro Deportivo Municipal to the immediately lower category from Liga 3.

== Kit and crest ==
The kit of Deportivo Municipal consists of a white jersey with a red stripe that goes from left to right, blue shorts and white socks. Its alternative uniform varies, it has 3 options. The first one has a red jersey and keeps the blue shorts and white socks. The second alternative uniform keeps the red stripe on the jersey but instead of being white, it is blue. The shorts and socks are also blue. The third alternative uniform uses black instead of blue (as the 2nd choice) but also keeps the red stripe on the jersey. The home shirt's colors are reminiscent of the Peruvian national team, and it refers to the fact that the day of its foundation in 1935 was the day before Peruvian Independence Day.

=== Kit evolution ===
1935–36; Old First kit	1936–present Home	1935–present Away	1998; 3° Away	2007; 3° Away

=== Historical badges ===
1935–1936

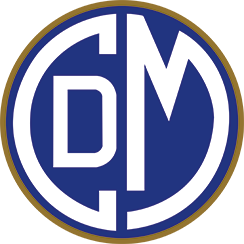
2015–present

== Stadium ==
Deportivo Municipal has employed the use of several stadiums throughout its history. Some of these grounds include the Estadio Nacional, Estadio Miguel Grau, Estadio Alejandro Villanueva, Estadio Universidad San Marcos and the former Estadio San Martín de Porres. It most used stadium during its history was the Estadio Municipal de Chorrillos, which has a capacity of 15,000. Now, the Estadio Iván Elías Moreno located in the district of Villa El Salvador serves as the home stadium for Deportivo Municipal. The stadium has a capacity of 11,000 and has been regularly used to host finals of the Copa Perú. However, in 2025 after renovations, Deportivo Municipal moved back into the Estadio Municipal de Chorillos.

== Current squad ==
As of 28 November 2024

Note: Flags indicate national team as defined under FIFA eligibility rules; some limited exceptions apply. Players may hold more than one non-FIFA nationality.

No.	Pos.	Nation	Player
2	DF	PER	Edson Espinoza
3	DF	PER	Leonardo Rugel
6	MF	PER	Adonis Hidalgo
8	FW	PER	Aarón Carnero
9	FW	PER	Quillian Meléndez
10	DF	PER	Jean Maraví
11	FW	PER	Mathias Panduro
12	GK	PER	Gilmar Alemán
14	MF	PER	Jhosep Núñez
15	DF	PER	Francesco Cavagna
16	GK	PER	Estefano Fernández
18	FW	PER	Christian Flores

No.	Pos.	Nation	Player
19	MF	PER	Eduardo Cabrera
20	DF	PER	Anthony Quijano
23	DF	PER	Joao Acosta
25	DF	PER	Óscar Villalobos
27	FW	PER	Fabricio Rojas
28	MF	PER	Leonel Solís
29	DF	PER	Sebastián Lojas (captain)
30	DF	PER	Jordy Santa Maria
33	GK	PER	Carlos Solís
72	DF	PER	Gianfranco Lucero
75	GK	PER	Benjamin Martin
95	FW	PER	Rodrigo Cacho Sousa

== Honours ==
=== Senior titles ===
Keys

- Record
- ^{(s)} Shared record

Type	Competition	Titles	Runner-up	Winning years	Runner-up years
National (League)	Primera División	4	8	1938, 1940, 1943, 1950	1941, 1942, 1944, 1945, 1946, 1947, 1951, 1981
National (League)	Segunda División	3	1	1968, 2006, 2014	2004
National (League)	Intermedia (1984–1987)	1	—	1984 Intermedia A	—
National (League)	Primera División Unificada de Lima y Callao	1	—	1936	—
National (League)	Copa Perú	—	1	—	2004
Half-year / Short; Tournament (League)	Torneo Regional	1	—	1981	—
Half-year / Short; Tournament (League)	Torneo Zona Metropolitana	—	1	—	1985
Half-year / Short; Tournament (League)	Campeonato de Apertura (ANA)	3	2	1946, 1951, 1957	1948, 1950
National (Cups)	Torneo Intermedio	1	—	1993	—
Regional (League)	División Intermedia	—	1	—	1935
Regional (League)	Región IV	—	1	—	2012
Regional (League)	Liga Departamental de Lima	1	—	2012	—
Regional (League)	Liga Provincial de Lima	1	—	2012	—
Regional (League)	Liga Distrital de Breña	1	—	2012	—
Regional (League)	Liga Distrital de Cercado de Lima	1	—	2011	—

=== Friendlies ===
Type	Competition	Titles	Runner-up	Winning years	Runner-up years
National (Cup)	Copa Callao	1	—	2007	—
National (Cup)	Torneo Relámpago	3	3	1944, 1946–I, 1951	1943, 1947–I, 1948

=== Under-20 team ===
Type	Competition	Titles	Runner-up	Winning years	Runner-up years
National (League)	Torneo Equipos de Reserva	2	1	1937, 1943	1981

== Performance in CONMEBOL competitions ==
- Copa Libertadores: 2 appearances

1982: Group Stage
2017: First Stage

- Copa Sudamericana: 2 appearances

2016: First Stage
2019: First Stage

- Copa de Campeones: 1 appearance

1948: Fourth Place

- Copa Ganadores de Copa: 1 appearance

1970: First Stage

== Notable players ==
- (Argentina) Fernando Martinuzzi (2007)
- (Argentina) Ángel Clemente Rojas (1972–73)
- (Japan) Masakatsu Sawa (2007, 2014–17)
- (Peru) Alfredo Carmona (1994–96)
- (Peru) Segundo Castillo (1943–47)
- (Peru) César Cueto (1974)
- (Peru) Jefferson Farfán (1993–00)
- (Peru) (Israel) Raul Geller (1956–59)
- (Peru) Luis Guzmán (1937–48)
- (Peru) Pier Larrauri (2017–19)
- (Uruguay) Pablo Lavandeira (2016, 2017–18)
- (Peru) Eduardo Malásquez (1976–82, 1985)
- (Peru) Máximo Mosquera (1943–48)
- (Peru) Franco Navarro (1980–82)
- (Peru) Roberto Drago (1940–45, 1947–51, 1953–61, 1964–65)
- (Peru) Juan Seminario (1954–59)
- (Peru) Nolberto Solano (1993)
- (Peru) Hugo Sotil (1968–73, 1981–82)
- (Peru) Jorge Soto (1990–92)
- (Peru) José Soto (1987–92)
- (Peru) Jerry Tamashiro (1994–96)
- (Peru) Adrián Zela (2014–19)

== Managers ==
- (Peru) Juan Valdivieso (1955–1958)
- (Peru) Roberto Drago (interim) (1959–1961)
- (Peru) Juan Valdivieso (1962–1963)
- (Argentina) Emilio Palestini (1963)
- (Peru) Juan Honores (1964)
- (Peru) Roberto Drago (1965)
- (Argentina) Donato Hernández (1965)
- (Peru) Luis Guzmán (1966)
- (Peru) Roberto Reinoso (1967)
- (Peru) Juan Mostorino (1967)
- (Peru) Alejandro Heredia (1968)
- (Peru) Roberto Drago (1969–1971)
- (Argentina) Alfredo Rojas (1972)
- (Peru) Alejandro Heredia (1973–1975)
- (Brazil) Zózimo (1976)
- (Uruguay) Juan Hohberg (1983)
- (Peru) Ramón Quiroga (1990–1992)
- (Peru) Julio César Uribe (1995)
- (Peru) Agustín Castillo (1997–1999)
- (Peru) Ramón Quiroga (1998)
- (Peru) Hugo Sotil (1999)
- (Argentina) Horacio Raúl Baldessari (2000)
- (Peru) Roberto Mosquera (2007)
- (Peru) Héctor Chumpitaz (2012)
- (Argentina) Roberto Pompei (2015)
- (Peru) Francisco Melgar (2015–2016)
- (Argentina) Marcelo Grioni (2016–2017)
- (Peru) Francisco Pizarro (2017)
- (Argentina) Gerardo Ameli (2017)
- (Peru) Víctor Rivera (2017–2020)
- (Peru) Franco Navarro (2020–2021)
- (Peru) Julio Argote (2021)
- (Argentina) Hernán Lisi (2021–2022)
- (Peru) Juan Pajuelo (2022)
- (Argentina) Ángel Comizzo (2023–)

== See also ==
- List of football clubs in Peru
- Peruvian football league system
