= 1945 Peruvian Segunda División =

Peruvian Segunda División
- Season: 1945
- Dates: 23 December 1945 – 13 January 1946
- Champions: Santiago Barranco
- Runner up: Atlético Lusitania
- Matches: 15
- Goals: 45 (3 per match)

The 1945 Peruvian Segunda División, the second division of Peruvian football (soccer), was played by 6 teams. The tournament winner, Santiago Barranco was promoted to the Promotional Playoff. Association Chorrillos and Unión Callao was promoted to the 1946 Peruvian Segunda División.

== Teams ==
=== Team changes ===
Promoted from
1944 Primera División Regional de Lima y Callao
▲ Atlético Lusitania (1st)

=== Stadia and locations ===
Team	City
Atlético Lusitania	Cercado de Lima
Ciclista Lima	Cercado de Lima
Jorge Chávez	Callao
Progresista Apurímac	Callao
Santiago Barranco	Barranco, Lima
Telmo Carbajo	Callao

== League table ==
=== Standings ===
Pos	Team	Pld	W	D	L	GF	GA	GD	Pts	Qualification or relegation
1	Santiago Barranco (C)	5	4	0	1	11	4	+7	8	Promotion play-off
2	Atlético Lusitania	5	3	0	2	10	4	+6	6	
3	Ciclista Lima	5	2	2	1	10	8	+2	6	
4	Telmo Carbajo	5	1	2	2	6	7	−1	4	
5	Jorge Chávez	5	1	1	3	6	13	−7	3	
6	Progresista Apurímac	5	0	3	2	2	9	−7	3	

(C) Champions

== Results ==
Teams play each other once, either home or away. All matches were played in Lima.

Home \ Away	LUS	CIC	JCC	PRO	SAN	TEL
Atlético Lusitania				3–0		2–1
Ciclista Lima	1–0			0–0	2–3	
Jorge Chávez	1–5	2–4				1–0
Progresista Apurímac			2–2		0–4	
Santiago Barranco	1–0		2–0			
Telmo Carbajo		3–3		0–0	2–1	

Updated to match(es) played on unknown. Source: Diario El Comercio, La Prensa and Crónica.
Legend: Blue = home team win; Yellow = draw; Red = away team win.

== Promotion play-off ==
The promotion/relegation play-off was a two-legged series played by the team placing 8th in the 1945 Primera División, Sport Boys and the 1945 Segunda División champion Santiago Barranco.

20 January 1946	Santiago Barranco	1–3	Sport Boys	Estadio Nacional, Lima
15:30	Netto 66'		Guillermo Valdiviezo 12'; Guillermo Arias 17'; Guillermo Barbadillo 40'	Referee: Félix Salazar

27 January 1946	Sport Boys	2–0	Santiago Barranco	Estadio Nacional, Lima
15:30	Manuel Drago 20' 38'			Referee: Félix Salazar

Sport Boys remain in the Primera División.

== See also ==
- 1945 Peruvian Primera División
