= 1942 Peruvian Primera División =

Peruvian Primera División
- Season: 1942
- Dates: 8 November 1942 – 2 May 1943
- Champions: Sport Boys (3rd title)
- Runner up: Deportivo Municipal
- Relegated: Telmo Carbajo; Santiago Barranco
- Matches: 45
- Goals: 157 (3.49 per match)
- Top goalscorer: Teodoro Fernández (11 goals)

The 1942 season of the Peruvian Primera División, the top category of Peruvian football, was played by 10 teams. The national champions were Sport Boys.

From 1931 until 1942 the points system was W:3, D:2, L:1, walkover:0.

== Teams ==
=== Team changes ===
Promoted from
1941 Segunda División Regional de Lima y Callao
▲ Santiago Barranco (1st)
▲ Centro Iqueño (2nd)

=== Stadia locations ===
| Team | City | Mannager |
|---|---|---|
| Alianza Lima | La Victoria, Lima | (Peru) Juan Valdivieso |
| Atlético Chalaco | Callao | (Peru) Julio Quintana |
| Centro Iqueño | Cercado de Lima | (Peru) Rafael Castillo |
| Deportivo Municipal | Cercado de Lima | (Peru) Juan Criado |
| Santiago Barranco | Barranco, Lima | |
| Sport Boys | Callao | (Peru) José Arana |
| Sporting Tabaco | Rímac, Lima | |
| Sucre | La Victoria, Lima | (Peru) Alfonso Huapaya |
| Telmo Carbajo | Callao | (Peru) Francisco Sabroso |
| Universitario | Cercado de Lima | (Peru) Arturo Fernández |

== League table ==
=== Standings ===
| Pos | Team | Pld | W | D | L | GF | GA | GD | Pts | Qualification or relegation |
|---|---|---|---|---|---|---|---|---|---|---|
| 1 | Sport Boys (C) | 9 | 6 | 2 | 1 | 22 | 10 | +12 | 23 | Champions |
| 2 | Deportivo Municipal | 9 | 6 | 1 | 2 | 21 | 10 | +11 | 22 | |
| 3 | Universitario | 9 | 5 | 2 | 2 | 17 | 14 | +3 | 21 | |
| 4 | Sucre | 9 | 5 | 2 | 2 | 13 | 10 | +3 | 21 | |
| 5 | Alianza Lima | 9 | 3 | 3 | 3 | 18 | 18 | 0 | 18 | |
| 6 | Atlético Chalaco | 9 | 4 | 0 | 5 | 13 | 12 | +1 | 17 | |
| 7 | Sporting Tabaco | 9 | 4 | 0 | 5 | 17 | 19 | −2 | 17 | |
| 8 | Centro Iqueño | 9 | 3 | 1 | 5 | 12 | 15 | −3 | 16 | |
| 9 | Telmo Carbajo (R) | 9 | 2 | 2 | 5 | 14 | 18 | −4 | 15 | 1943 Segunda División |
| 10 | Santiago Barranco (R) | 9 | 0 | 1 | 8 | 10 | 31 | −21 | 10 | 1943 Segunda División |

(C) Champions; (R) Relegated

== Results ==
Teams play each other once, either home or away. All matches were played at the Estadio Nacional, Lima.

| Home \ Away | ALI | CHA | CEN | MUN | SAN | SBA | TAB | SUC | TEL | UNI |
|---|---|---|---|---|---|---|---|---|---|---|
| Alianza Lima | | 3–0 | | | | | | 0–0 | | 4–4 |
| Atlético Chalaco | | | 1–2 | | 4–0 | | | | | 1–0 |
| Centro Iqueño | 3–1 | | | | 3–1 | | | 0–2 | | 1–2 |
| Deportivo Municipal | 4–0 | 1–0 | 1–1 | | 5–1 | 4–2 | 2–1 | | | |
| Santiago Barranco | 3–5 | | | | | 1–4 | | 2–4 | 0–0 | 1–2 |
| Sport Boys | 2–2 | 2–1 | 2–1 | | | | | | 1–1 | 2–0 |
| Sporting Tabaco | 2–1 | 4–2 | 2–0 | | 4–1 | 0–4 | | 0–1 | | |
| Sucre | | 0–1 | | 2–1 | | 0–3 | | | 4–3 | |
| Telmo Carbajo | 0–2 | 0–3 | 3–1 | 1–2 | | | 4–2 | | | |
| Universitario | | | | 2–1 | | | 4–2 | 0–0 | 3–2 | |

Updated to match(es) played on 1942. Source: Diario El Comercio, La Prensa and Crónica.
Legend: Blue = home team win; Yellow = draw; Red = away team win.

== See also ==
- 1942 Primera División Regional de Lima y Callao
