= Lurin =

Quartier of Saint Barthélemy in the Caribbean

- Quartier
- The quartier of Lurin marked 19.
- Coordinates: 17°53′33″N 62°50′23″W
- Country: France
- Overseas collectivity: Saint Barthélemy

Lurin (French pronunciation: [lyʁɛ̃]) is a quartier of Saint Barthélemy in the Caribbean. It is east of Gustavia and is one of the larger quartiers on the island.
