= Chorrillos District =

Coordinates: 12°11′11″S 77°01′16″W

Chorrillos
- District
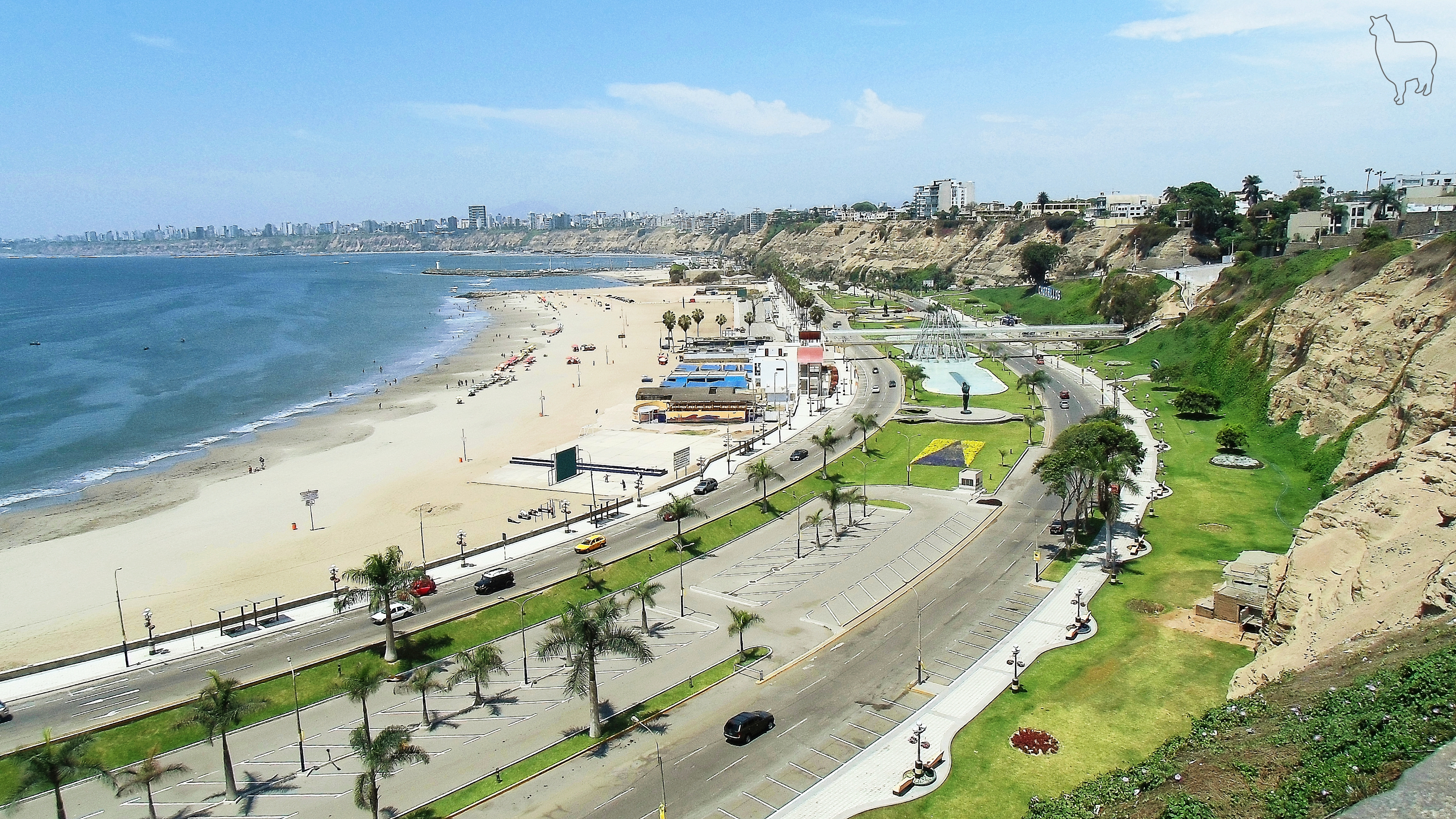

- Coat of arms

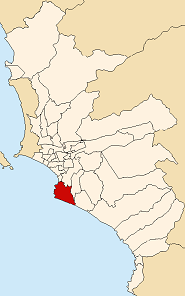
- Location of Chorrillos in Lima
- Country: Peru
- Region: Lima
- Province: Lima

Government
  - Mayor: Fernando Velasco (2023-2026)

Area
  - Total: 38.94 km^{2} (15.03 sq mi)
- Elevation: 37 m (121 ft)

Population (2023)
  - Total: 373,332
  - Density: 9,587/km^{2} (24,830/sq mi)
- Time zone: UTC-5 (PET)
- UBIGEO: 150108
- Website: munichorrillos.gob.pe

Chorrillos (Spanish: [t͡ʃoriˈʎos]; lit. 'trickles [of water]') is a district of Lima, Peru. A middle-income residential district, it is located next to the Pacific Ocean and forms part of the city's area known as the Costa Verde, which is home to a number of beaches, as well as private clubs and the country's national military school.

It was founded as a deluxe beach resort in 1824, becoming a town in 1856. In 1881, during the War of the Pacific, it was destroyed and looted by the invading Chilean Army, after which it was rebuilt and incorporated into the city of Lima as it grew during the 20th century. The district's current mayor is Fernando Velasco Huamán.

== Etymology ==
Founded as San Pedro de los Chorrillos, it takes its name from the trickles of fresh water that once flowed from the cliffs in front of a beach known as Agua Dulce. Due to it originally being a fishermen's settlement, it was also named after Saint Peter, their patron saint.

== History ==
The area around the Morro Solar headland was once a pre-Columbian town known as Armatambo. Following the Spanish conquest of Peru, however, the hillside settlement was abandoned (few fragments exist today, most in bad condition, some endangered to disappear) and forgotten, as the Indians began to move down to shore. The resulting town of San Pedro de los Chorrillos was officially established as the District of Chorrillos on January 2, 1857.

The district's territory was the setting of important episodes in the War of the Pacific against Chile (1879–1883). The so-called Battle of Chorrillos took place in the fields of San Juan, about 11 kilometres (6.8 mi) away from the town on January 13, 1881; but after the battle, the Chilean soldiers looted, sacked and set fire to the town of Chorrillos, raped the women and killed many civilians, including foreigners, children and women. There is a nameplate inside the Fire Station that remembers the names of the Italian firemen who were executed by a Chilean firing squad for attempting to put out the fires and save the civilian population. From republican times, only a select group of the large old houses have survived, as the majority were destroyed by Chilean invaders.

The Chorrillos Military School was opened here in 1898.

According to the 2005 census by the INEI, the district had 262,595 inhabitants, a population density of 6,743.6 persons/km² and 60,353 households.

== Geography ==
The district has a total land area of 38.94 km². The area's geography allows for a panoramic view of the Bay of Lima and out to La Punta and San Lorenzo Island in Callao. The administrative center is located 37 meters above sea level. Morro Solar is situated in Chorrillos District.

=== Boundaries ===
- North: Barranco and Santiago de Surco
- East: Santiago de Surco
- South and west: Pacific Ocean

== Culture ==
It is famous for its beach resorts at La Herradura, its restaurants, particularly the picanterías (specialising in spicy dishes). A planetarium is located at the Morro Solar.

The following festivities are celebrated in the district:

- June: Saint Peter
- October: Lord of Miracles

== Notable people ==
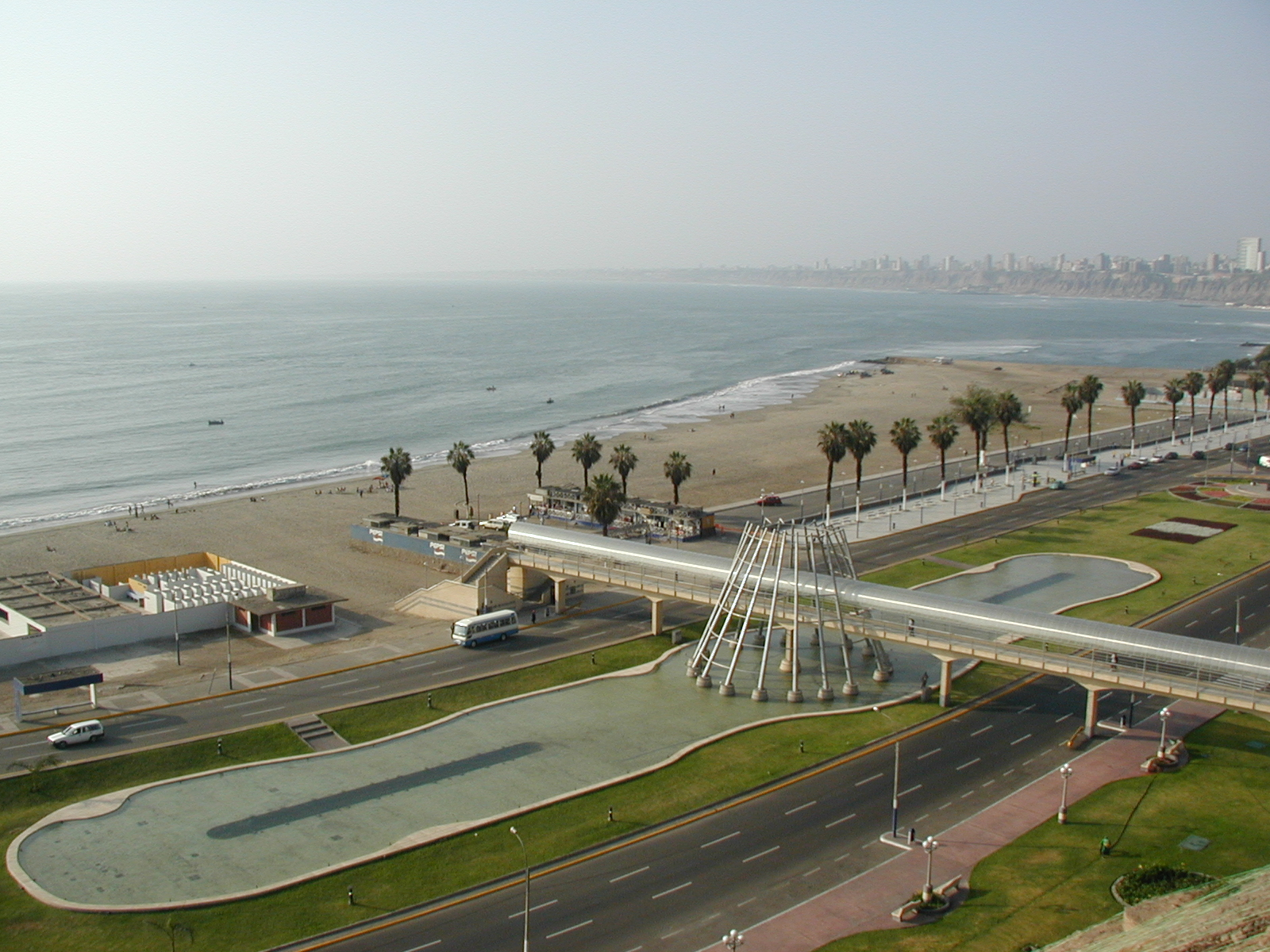
View of the Chorrilos coastal area

- Susana Baca, singer-songwriter.
- Juan José Cabezudo, chef.
- Jean Carlos Gamarra, taekwondo athlete and founder of a sports programme for the impoverished children of Delicias, a poor neighbourhood in the district.
- Ramón Miranda Ampuero, general and former Minister of Education.
- José Olaya, fisherman and spy during the Peruvian War of Independence.
- Roberto "El Chorrillano" Palacios, midfielder of the Peru national football team.

== See also ==
- Barranco District
