= Miguel Rostaing =

Peruvian footballer and manager (1900–1983)

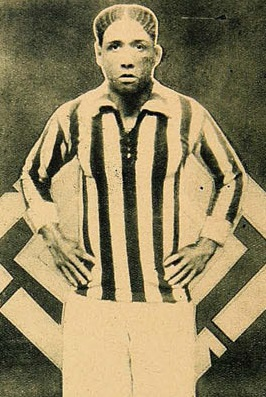

Personal information
- Full name: Miguel José Rostaing La Torre
- Date of birth: 3 July 1900
- Place of birth: Lima, Peru
- Date of death: 13 May 1983 (aged 82)
- Position: Forward

Youth career
- Teniente Ruiz

Senior career*
Years	Team	Apps	(Gls)
1919–1924	Sport Alianza		
1925	Unión Buenos Aires		
1926–1929	Alianza Lima		
1929–1930	Atlético Chalaco		
1931–1935	Alianza Lima		
1936	Deportivo Municipal		

International career
1929	Peru	3	(0)

Managerial career
- 1946: Sport Boys
- * Club domestic league appearances and goals

Miguel José Rostaing La Torre (3 July 1900 – 13 May 1983) is a Peruvian football manager and former player.

== Playing career ==
Nicknamed El quemado (the burned) due to a household accident in his youth, Miguel Rostaing spent most of his career with Alianza Lima. He won six Peruvian championships there: in 1919 (the club was called Sport Alianza at the time), 1927, 1928, 1931, 1932 and 1933.

He also played for Atlético Chalaco between 1929 and 1930, winning another Peruvian championship in 1930. He finished his playing career with Deportivo Municipal in 1936.

A Peruvian international, he participated in the 1929 South American Championship in Argentina, where he played three matches without scoring a goal.

== Managerial career ==
Having become a coach, Miguel Rostaing had the opportunity to manage Sport Boys of Callao in 1946 when he replaced José Arana mid-season.

== Honours ==
=== Player ===
Alianza Lima

- Peruvian Primera División (6): 1919, 1927, 1928, 1931, 1932, 1933

Atlético Chalaco

- Peruvian Primera División: 1930

Deportivo Municipal

- Primera División Unificada de Lima y Callao: 1936
