= 1936 Torneo Extraordinario de la División de Honor =

- Season: 1936
- Dates: 20 December 1936 – 10 January 1937
- Champions: Universitario
- Runner up: Alianza Lima
- Matches: 9
- Goals: 34 (3.78 per match)
- Top goalscorer: Juan Puente (3 goals); Alegre (3 goals)

The Torneo Extraordinario de la División de Honor, also called Torneo Extraordinario, was an exhibition football competition hosted in Lima, Peru in 1936. All matches were played at the Estadio Nacional in Lima. Universitario were declared champions after defeating Alianza Lima 2–0 in the final.

In 1936, it was an amateur non official Tournament (“Division de Honor”) of Lima and Callao but organized by Peruvian Football Federation (FPF).

No official tournament took place, because the Peru national football team competed at the 1936 Berlin Olympic Games and 1937 South American Championship

== History ==
The local football season was divided into three phases during 1936. In the first phase, a series of friendly matches were played, both at the domestic and international level. In the second phase, the Peruvian national team took part in the 1936 Berlin Olympic Games. In the third phase, the first-ever División de Honor championship was supposed to be held, a plan that ultimately never materialized.

After the Peruvian footballers returned from Europe, it was expected that the clubs would reach an agreement for the official competition to begin. However, time passed without any concrete decision being made to start the tournament.

Thus, on October 31, the Peruvian Football Federation definitively agreed that the Official Championship would not be played.

With little expectation of seeing football in Lima, and after the Peruvian national team departed for Buenos Aires to participate in the 1937 South American Championship, an initiative emerged during the first week of December within the División de Honor to stage a tournament among its eight member clubs, despite the fact that many of the capital’s leading players would be absent due to their call-ups to the Peru national team.

Several formats were considered for the competition, including the possibility of forming a single team made up of players from Alianza Lima, Universitario and Sport Boys, as it was believed that these clubs might struggle to field a competitive XI given that many of their best players were with the national team. In the end, this idea was abandoned, as the three clubs reorganized their squads and opted to rely on players from their reserve teams.

The tournament also included Sporting Tabaco, Telmo Carbajo, Sportivo Tarapacá Ferrocarril, Atlético Chalaco and Sucre

The lightning tournament kicked off on December 20, 1936, and ran until January 17, 1937, with a total of nine matches played.

== Teams ==
Team	City
Alianza Lima	La Victoria, Lima
Atlético Chalaco	Callao
Sport Boys	Callao
Sporting Tabaco	Rímac, Lima
Sportivo Tarapacá Ferrocarril	Cercado de Lima
Sucre	La Victoria, Lima
Telmo Carbajo	Callao
Universitario	Cercado de Lima

== Bracket ==
Quarterfinals
Universitario	2	1	3
Telmo Carbajo	2	0	2
Atlético Chalaco	5	—	5
Sport Boys	0	—	0
Alianza Lima	5	—	5
Sucre	1	—	1
Sporting Tabaco	3	—	3
Sportivo Tarapacá Ferrocarril	1	—	1

Semifinals
Universitario	1	2	3
Atlético Chalaco	1	1	2
Alianza Lima	4	—	4
Sporting Tabaco	3	—	3

Finals
Universitario	2
Alianza Lima	0

== Quarterfinals ==
20 December 1936	Sporting Tabaco	3–1	Sportivo Tarapacá Ferrocarril	Estadio Nacional, Lima
13:30	Alegre 24' 30'; Cancino 49'		Sierra 62'	Referee: Arnold Rottman

20 December 1936	Atlético Chalaco	5–0	Sport Boys	Estadio Nacional, Lima
15:30	Miñán 57'; Bedoya 59'; Otero 66'; Albarracín			Referee: Juan Bulneo

27 December 1936	Alianza Lima	5–1	Sucre	Estadio Nacional, Lima
13:30	Quispe; Bruzzon; Juan Puente		Flores

27 December 1936	Universitario	2–2	Telmo Carbajo	Estadio Nacional, Lima
15:50	José Bayro 16'; Alberto Baldovino 86'		Díaz 54' 65'	Referee: José Luna

=== Extra match ===
1 January 1937	Universitario	1–0	Telmo Carbajo	Estadio Nacional, Lima
	José Bayro 18'			Referee: José Luna

== Semifinals ==
3 January 1937	Alianza Lima	4–3	Sporting Tabaco	Estadio Nacional, Lima
13:30	Leopoldo Quiñónez 5'; Juan Puente 10'; Cancino 77' (o.g.); 82' (pen.)		Soria 20' 79'; Alegre 57'	Referee: Enrique Cuenca

3 January 1937	Universitario	1–1	Atlético Chalaco	Estadio Nacional, Lima
15:30	Saba 3'		Luis Quiles 70'	Referee: José Luna

=== Extra match ===
10 January 1937	Universitario	2–1	Atlético Chalaco	Estadio Nacional, Lima
	Alfredo Biffi 19'; Víctor Bielich 50'		Albarracín 10'	Referee: Enrique Cuenca

== Final ==
17 January 1937

Universitario	2–0	Alianza Lima
Flores Guerra; Víctor Bielich 75'

Estadio Nacional, Lima
Referee: Tagle

== See also ==
- 1936 Primera División Unificada de Lima y Callao
