= Juan Valdivieso =

Peruvian footballer (1910-2007)

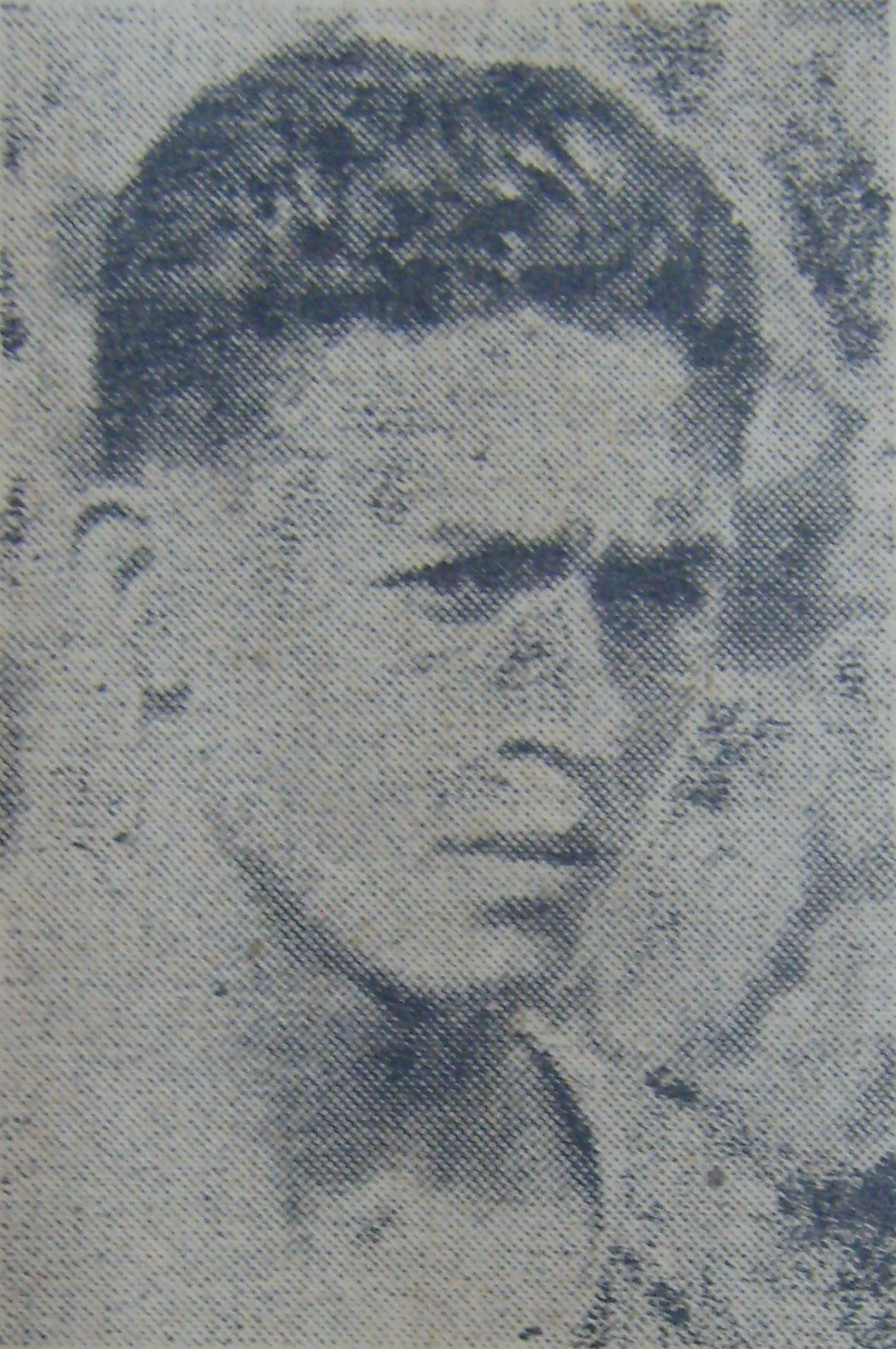

Personal information
- Full name: Juan Humberto Valdivieso Padilla
- Date of birth: 6 May 1910
- Place of birth: Lima, Peru
- Date of death: 2 May 2007 (aged 96)
- Place of death: Lima, Peru
- Height: 1.74 m (5 ft 9 in)
- Positions: Goalkeeper; forward

Senior career*
Years	Team	Apps	(Gls)
1921–1941	Alianza Lima		

International career
1930–1938	Peru	10	(0)

Managerial career
- Deportivo Municipal
- Defensor Lima
- Atlético Chalaco
- 1954–1955: Peru
- 1963: Peru
Medal record
Men's football
Representing Peru
Bolivarian Games
Gold medal – first place	1938 Bogotá
Copa América
Winner	1939 Lima
Third place	1935 Lima
- * Club domestic league appearances and goals

Juan Humberto Valdivieso Padilla (6 May 1910 – 2 May 2007) was a Peruvian football goalkeeper and manager.

== Playing career ==
During his career, he played club football for Alianza Lima where he won five Peruvian championships. He made 10 appearances for the Peru national football team, participating at the 1930 FIFA World Cup and the 1936 Summer Olympics.

== Managerial career ==
After retiring as a player, he began a coaching career, first at Deportivo Municipal, with whom he won two Peruvian championships in 1943 and 1950. He then coached Defensor Lima and Atlético Chalaco. He was the manager of the Peruvian national team twice, from 1954 to 1955 and again in 1963.

== Personal life ==
His youngest son, Luis Valdivieso Montano, is the current Minister of the Economy and Finance of Peru. His grandson, Juan Pablo Valdivieso, represented Peru in swimming during the 2000 and 2004 Summer Olympics.

He died in 2007 at 96 years old.

== Honours ==
=== Player ===
Alianza Lima

- Peruvian Primera División (5): 1927, 1927, 1931, 1932, 1933
- Ligas Provinciales de Lima y Callao: 1939

Peru

- South American Championship: 1939
- Bolivarian Games: 1938

=== Manager ===
Deportivo Municipal

- Peruvian Primera División (2): 1943, 1950

Peru (amateur)

- Bolivarian Games: 1947–48
