= Alberto Montellanos =

Peruvian footballer (1899–1955)

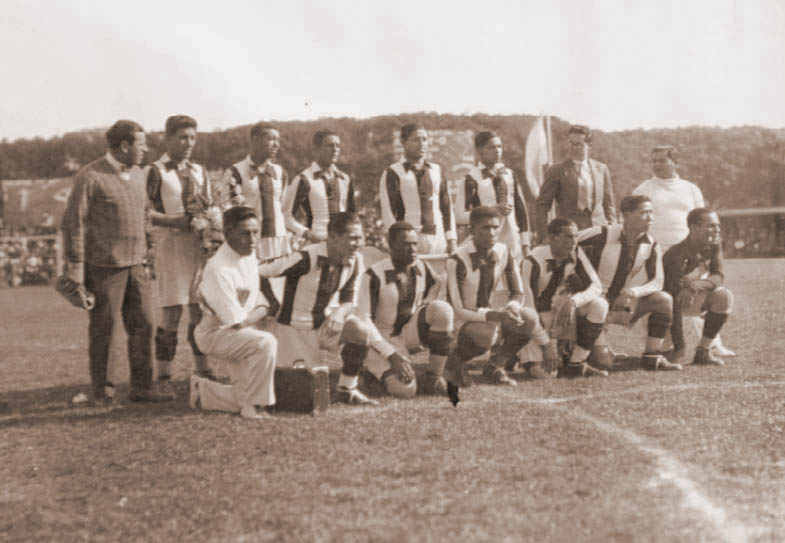
- Peru at the 1927 South American Championship. Montellanos is crouching, 4th from the left.

Personal information
- Full name: Alberto Montellanos Huertas
- Date of birth: 14 March 1899
- Place of birth: Lima, Peru
- Date of death: 30 November 1955 (aged 56)
- Place of death: Lima, Peru
- Position: Forward

Senior career*
Years	Team	Apps	(Gls)
- Sport José Gálvez
1926–1935	Alianza Lima		

International career
1927–1935	Peru	4	(2)
- * Club domestic league appearances and goals

Alberto Montellanos Huertas (14 March 1899 – 30 November 1955) was a Peruvian professional footballer who played as forward.

== Playing career ==
=== Club ===
A major figure for Alianza Lima in the 1920s and 1930s, Alberto Montellanos – nicknamed Hombre culebra (the snake man) – won five Peruvian championships with the Blanquiazul club in 1927, 1928, 1931, 1932, and 1933. He became famous for scoring a goal from 20 meters into the top right corner of the net, past the renowned Spanish goalkeeper Ricardo Zamora, during a friendly match between Alianza Lima and RCD Espanyol of Barcelona on 30 August 1926.

=== International ===
Peruvian international, Alberto Montellanos played four matches for the national team between 1927 and 1935. He took part in the South American championships of 1927 (one goal scored against Bolivia) and 1935 (one goal scored against Chile).

== Honours ==
Alianza Lima

- Peruvian Primera División (5): 1927, 1928, 1931, 1932, 1933
