= Alejandro Villanueva (footballer) =

Peruvian footballer (1908–1944)

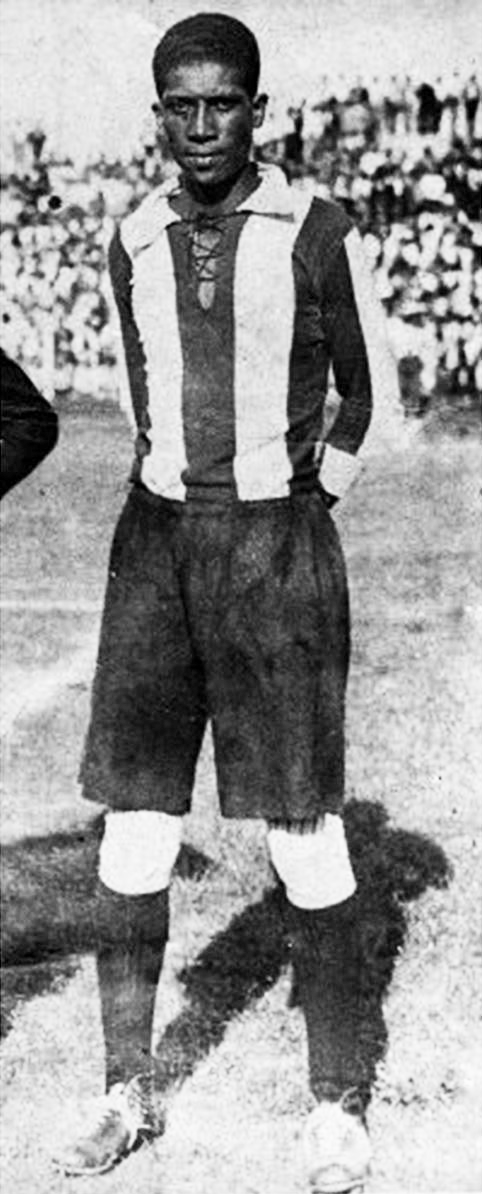

Personal information
- Full name: Carlos Alejandro Villanueva Martínez
- Date of birth: 4 June 1908
- Place of birth: Lima, Peru
- Date of death: 11 April 1944 (aged 35)
- Place of death: Lima, Peru
- Height: 1.98 m (6 ft 6 in)
- Position: Striker

Senior career*
Years	Team	Apps	(Gls)
1926	Teniente Ruiz		
1927–1943	Alianza Lima	99	(71)

International career^{‡}
1927–1938	Peru	11	(6)

Managerial career
- 1940–1941: Alianza Lima
Medal record
Representing Peru
Men's football
Bolivarian Games
Gold medal – first place	1938 Bogotá
South American Championship
Third place	1927 Peru
Third place	1935 Peru
- * Club domestic league appearances and goals as of 18 September 2012 ‡ National team caps and goals as of 18 September 2012

Carlos Alejandro Villanueva Martínez (4 June 1908 – 11 April 1944) was a Peruvian footballer who played for Alianza Lima and the Peru national football team. He is considered one of the most important Alianza strikers in the 1920s and 1930s.

== Club career ==
Born in Lima, Peru, Villanueva started his career at Teniente Ruiz but moved on to Alianza Lima after a year, where he would play the rest of his career.

He was noted to have an extraordinary handling the football and his many outrageous moves won him the nickname "Manguera". Among his many exploits, the bicycle kick was one of the moves that won him widespread recognition. While playing for Alianza Lima, Villanueva's fame increased as he made international appearances, such as in 1933 when Alianza Lima made a tour in Chile. With fellow Peruvians such as Teodoro Fernandez, he delighted the audiences with his skill and defeated a series of important Chilean clubs of that time, including Club Deportivo Magallanes, Santiago Wanderers, Audax Italiano, and Colo-Colo. In Peru, Villanueva is often remembered as one of the finest exponents of association football. Early on, the people of Lima believed the bicycle kick was his invention when he executed it in 1928, and commonly called it "tiro caracol". Later, the name changed to "chalaca" when people began to favor the idea that the move was invented in Callao several decades earlier. As a result of these achievements, Villanueva remains a famous figure in Peru to the point that several songs have been made about him and his club, Alianza Lima.

== International career ==
With the Peru national football team, he played at the 1927, 1935 and 1937 South American Championship, 1930 FIFA World Cup and 1936 Summer Olympics. Villanueva played on the team that won the football tournament at the inaugural Bolivarian Games in 1938.

== Death and legacy ==
Villanueva died at the age of 35 after contracting tuberculosis. Alianza Lima's stadium, located in the La Victoria district of Lima, is named after him and is popularly known as "Matute".

== Honours ==
Alejandro Villanueva
Medal record
Gold medal – first place	1938 Bolivarian Games	NA

Alianza Lima

- Peruvian League (5): 1927, 1928, 1931, 1932, 1933
- First tier of the league of Lima and Callao: 1939

Individual

- Peruvian League's Top Scorer (2): 1928, 1931

Peru

- Bolivarian Games: 1938

== Statistics ==
=== International goals ===
Scores and results table. Peru's goal tally first:

List of international goals scored by Alejandro Villanueva
No.	Date	Venue	Opponent	Score	Result	Competition
1.	27 November 1927	Estadio Nacional, Lima, Peru	Argentina	1–1	1–5	South American Championship 1927
2.	6 August 1936	Hertha-BSC-Platz, Berlin, Germany	Finland	2–0	7–3	1936 Summer Olympics
3.	6 August 1936	Hertha-BSC-Platz, Berlin, Germany	Finland	6–1	7–3	1936 Summer Olympics
4.	8 August 1936	Hertha-BSC-Platz, Berlin, Germany	Austria	2–2	4–2	1936 Summer Olympics
5.	8 August 1936	Hertha-BSC-Platz, Berlin, Germany	Austria	3–2	4–2	1936 Summer Olympics
6.	27 December 1936	Estadio Gasómetro, Buenos Aires, Argentina	Brazil	2–3	2–3	South American Championship 1937
