= 1931 Peruvian Primera División =

Peruvian Primera División
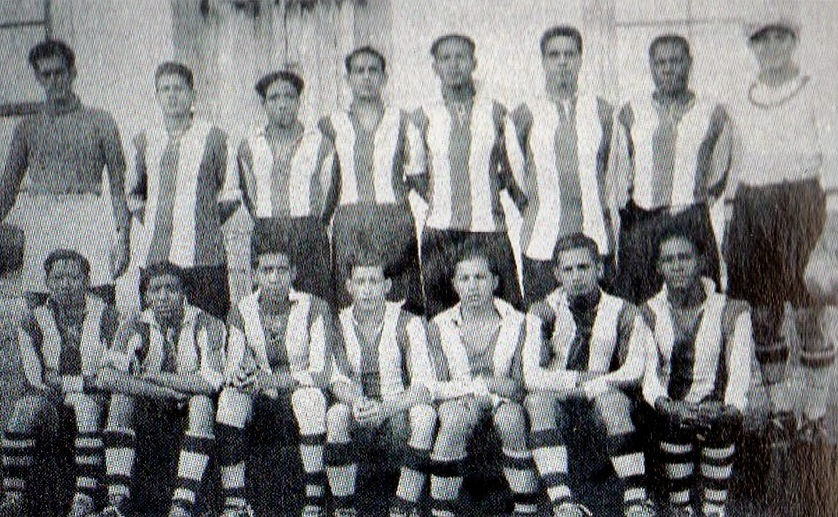
- Alianza Lima, champion
- Season: 1931
- Dates: 26 April 1931 – 5 July 1931
- Champions: Alianza Lima (5th title)
- Runner up: Sporting Tabaco
- Relegated: none
- Top goalscorer: Alejandro Villanueva (16 goals)

The 1931 season of the Peruvian Primera División was the 16th season of top-flight Peruvian football. It was played by 12 teams. The national champions were Alianza Lima. Federación Universitaria and Ciclista Lima were both deducted 1 point because of walkover defeats. First Division reduced to 8 teams for 1932.

The whole tournament was played in three stadiums:

Stadium	City
Estadio Nacional	Lima
Estadio Víctor Manuel III	Lima
Estadio Modelo de Bellavista	Callao

== Format ==
- From 1931 until 1934 the results of a reserve teams league were added as bonus points.
- From 1931 until 1942 the points system was W:3, D:2, L:1, walkover:0.

== Teams ==
=== Team changes ===
Promoted from 1930 División Intermedia	Relegated from 1930 Primera División
▲ Alianza Frigorífico (1st)	▼ Sport Progreso (12th)

=== Stadia and Locations ===
Team	City
Alianza Frigorífico	Callao
Alianza Lima	La Victoria, Lima
Atlético Chalaco	Callao
Ciclista Lima	Cercado de Lima
Circolo Sportivo Italiano	Pueblo Libre, Lima
Escuela de Hidroaviación	Ancón, Lima
Federación Universitaria	Cercado de Lima
Lawn Tennis de la Exposición	Jesús María, Lima
Sporting Tabaco	Rímac, Lima
Sportivo Tarapacá Ferrocarril	Cercado de Lima
Sportivo Unión	Cercado de Lima
Unión Buenos Aires	Callao

== Torneo Primeros Equipos ==
=== Standings ===
Pos	Team	Pld	W	D	L	GF	GA	GD	Pts	Qualification
1	Alianza Lima	11	11	0	0	53	4	+49	33	Champions
2	Sporting Tabaco	11	8	1	2	35	19	+16	28	
3	Atlético Chalaco	11	6	2	3	27	25	+2	25	
4	Alianza Frigorífico	11	7	0	4	15	18	−3	25	
5	Federación Universitaria (Note: Federación Universitaria were deducted one point for walkover.)	11	5	1	5	23	15	+8	21	
6	Sportivo Tarapacá Ferrocarril	11	4	2	5	20	25	−5	21	
7	Escuela de Hidroaviación	11	4	1	6	21	22	−1	20	
8	Sportivo Unión	11	4	1	6	18	20	−2	20	
9	Unión Buenos Aires	11	4	1	6	19	24	−5	20	
10	Circolo Sportivo Italiano	11	4	0	7	11	29	−18	19	
11	Lawn Tennis de la Exposición	11	2	0	9	9	24	−15	15	
12	Ciclista Lima (Note: Ciclista Lima were deducted one point for walkover.)	11	2	1	8	14	40	−26	15	

=== Results ===
Teams play each other once, either home or away. All matches were played in Lima.

Home \ Away	ALI	FRI	CHA	CIC	CSI	UNI	HID	TEN	TAB	SUN	TAR	UBA
Alianza Lima		6–1	5–1	10–1	10–0	W.O.	2–0				5–0	
Alianza Frigorífico			3–2	W.O.		0–1	2–1	1–0		1–0		3–1
Atlético Chalaco						2–1			3–2	4–3	2–2	3–2
Ciclista Lima			3–4					3–2		1–3		4–2
Circolo Sportivo Italiano		2–1	0–4	2–0		3–2				1–0		0–2
Federación Universitaria				7–0			3–5			1–1		
Escuela de Hidroaviación			1–1	2–0	3–0			2–0				
Lawn Tennis de la Exposición	0–5		3–1		1–0	0–1			0–1			
Sporting Tabaco	0–4	5–1		6–0	3–2	3–1	5–2			2–1	6–3	
Sportivo Unión	0–3						3–2	3–1			2–3	2–1
Sportivo Tarapacá Ferrocarril		0–2		2–2	3–1	1–2	2–1	4–1				
Unión Buenos Aires	1–3					0–4	4–2	3–1	2–2		1–0	

Updated to match(es) played on 1931. Source: Diario El Comercio, La Prensa and Crónica.
Legend: Blue = home team win; Yellow = draw; Red = away team win.

== Torneo Equipos de Reserva ==
=== Standings ===
Pos	Team	Pld	W	D	L	Pts	Qualification
1	Federación Universitaria	11	8	3	0	30	Champions
2	Alianza Frigorífico	11	7	2	2	27	
3	Sporting Tabaco (Note: Sporting Tabaco were deducted one point for walkover.)	11	6	2	3	24	
4	Alianza Lima (Note: Alianza Lima were deducted two points for walkover.)	11	6	2	3	23	
5	Lawn Tennis de la Exposición (Note: Lawn Tennis de la Exposición were deducted one point for walkover.)	11	5	2	4	22	
6	Sportivo Tarapacá Ferrocarril	11	4	3	4	22	
7	Unión Buenos Aires (Note: Unión Buenos Aires were deducted one point for walkover.)	11	5	0	6	20	
8	Circolo Sportivo Italiano (Note: Circolo Sportivo Italiano were deducted one point for walkover.)	11	4	2	5	20	
9	Sportivo Unión (Note: Sportivo Unión were deducted one point for walkover.)	11	4	1	6	19	
10	Escuela de Hidroaviación	11	2	1	8	16	
11	Ciclista Lima (Note: Ciclista Lima were deducted one point for walkover.)	11	2	1	8	15	
12	Atlético Chalaco	11	0	1	10	12	

== Tabla Absoluta ==
Pos	Team	Pld	W	D	L	GF	GA	GD	Pts	Resv.	Total	Qualification or relegation
1	Alianza Lima (C)	11	11	0	0	53	4	+49	33	5.75	38.75	Champions
2	Sporting Tabaco	11	8	1	2	35	19	+16	28	6	34	
3	Alianza Frigorífico	11	7	0	4	15	18	−3	25	6.75	31.75	
4	Federación Universitaria	11	5	1	5	23	15	+8	21	7.5	28.5	
5	Atlético Chalaco	11	6	2	3	27	25	+2	25	3	28	
6	Sportivo Tarapacá Ferrocarril	11	4	2	5	20	25	–5	21	5.5	26.5	
7	Unión Buenos Aires	11	4	1	6	19	24	–5	20	5	25	
8	Sportivo Unión	11	4	1	6	18	20	–2	20	4.75	24.75	
9	Escuela de Hidroaviación	11	4	1	6	21	22	–1	20	4	24	Liguilla de promoción
10	Circolo Sportivo Italiano	11	4	0	7	11	29	–18	19	5	24	Liguilla de promoción
11	Lawn Tennis de la Exposición	11	2	0	9	9	24	–15	15	5.5	20.5	Liguilla de promoción
12	Ciclista Lima	11	2	1	8	14	40	–26	15	3.75	18.75	Liguilla de promoción

== Liguilla de Promoción ==
It was played with the last four places in the First Division and the four best in the 1931 División Intermedia (Juventud Perú, Miguel Grau, Sport Progreso and Sucre).

=== Torneo Primeros Equipos ===
Pos	Team	Pld	W	D	L	GF	GA	GD	Pts
1	Sport Progreso	7	5	2	0	17	8	+9	19
2	Escuela de Hidroaviación	7	4	1	2	17	12	+5	16
3	Lawn Tennis de la Exposición	7	4	1	2	16	15	+1	16
4	Circolo Sportivo Italiano	7	3	2	2	13	11	+2	15
5	Ciclista Lima	7	3	2	2	9	11	−2	15
6	Juventud Perú	7	3	0	4	9	13	−4	13
7	Sucre	7	2	0	5	6	12	−6	11
8	Miguel Grau (Note: Miguel Grau were deducted one point for walkover.)	7	0	0	7	5	11	−6	6

==== Results ====
Teams play each other once, either home or away. All matches were played in Lima.

Home \ Away	CIC	CSI	HID	JPE	LTE	GRA	PRO	SUC
Ciclista Lima					0–1	2–1	2–2	2–1
Circolo Sportivo Italiano	1–1		2–2	3–0				
Escuela de Hidroaviación	5–1			5–2	3–4			1–0
Juventud Perú	0–1				2–0	1–0	1–3	
Lawn Tennis de la Exposición		3–6					1–1	3–0
Miguel Grau		0–1	0–1		3–4			
Sport Progreso		3–1	3–0			2–1		
Sucre		2–0		1–3		W.O.	2–3	

Updated to match(es) played on 1931. Source: Diario El Comercio, La Prensa and Crónica.
Legend: Blue = home team win; Yellow = draw; Red = away team win.

=== Torneo Equipos de Reserva ===
Pos	Team	Pld	W	D	L	Pts
1	Lawn Tennis de la Exposición	7	5	2	0	19
2	Circolo Sportivo Italiano	7	3	3	1	16
3	Escuela de Hidroaviación	7	3	3	1	16
4	Ciclista Lima	7	3	2	2	15
5	Juventud Perú	7	3	1	3	14
6	Sucre	7	2	2	3	13
7	Miguel Grau (Note: Miguel Grau were deducted one point for walkover.)	7	1	2	4	10
8	Sport Progreso	7	1	1	5	10

=== Tabla Absoluta ===
Pos	Team	Pld	W	D	L	GF	GA	GD	Pts	Resv.	Total	Qualification or relegation
1	Sport Progreso	7	5	2	0	17	8	+9	19	2.5	21.5	1932 Primera División
2	Lawn Tennis de la Exposición	7	4	1	2	16	15	+1	16	4.75	20.75	1932 Primera División
3	Hidroaviación	7	3	2	2	17	12	+5	16	4	20	1932 Primera División
4	Circolo Sportivo Italiano	7	3	2	2	13	11	+2	15	4	19	1932 Primera División
5	Ciclista Lima	7	3	2	2	9	11	−2	15	3.75	18.75	1932 Primera División
6	Juventud Perú	7	3	0	4	9	13	−4	13	3.5	16.5	1932 División Intermedia
7	Sucre	7	2	0	5	6	12	−6	11	3.25	14.25	1932 División Intermedia
8	Miguel Grau	7	0	0	7	5	11	−6	6	2.5	8.5	1932 División Intermedia

== Top scorers ==
Rank	Player	Club	Goals
1	(Peru) Alejandro Villanueva	Alianza Lima	16
2	(Peru) Manuel Puente	Atlético Chalaco	15
3	(Peru) Fermín Machado	Unión Buenos Aires	11
4	(Peru) Víctor Pasache	Sporting Tabaco	10
5	(Peru) Daniel Breinding	Escuela de Hidroaviación	8
5	(Peru) Alberto Montellanos	Alianza Lima	8
5	(Peru) Bravo	Sportivo Tarapacá Ferrocarril	8

== See also ==
- 1931–32 Copa_Uruguay
