= 1928 Peruvian Primera División =

Peruvian Primera División
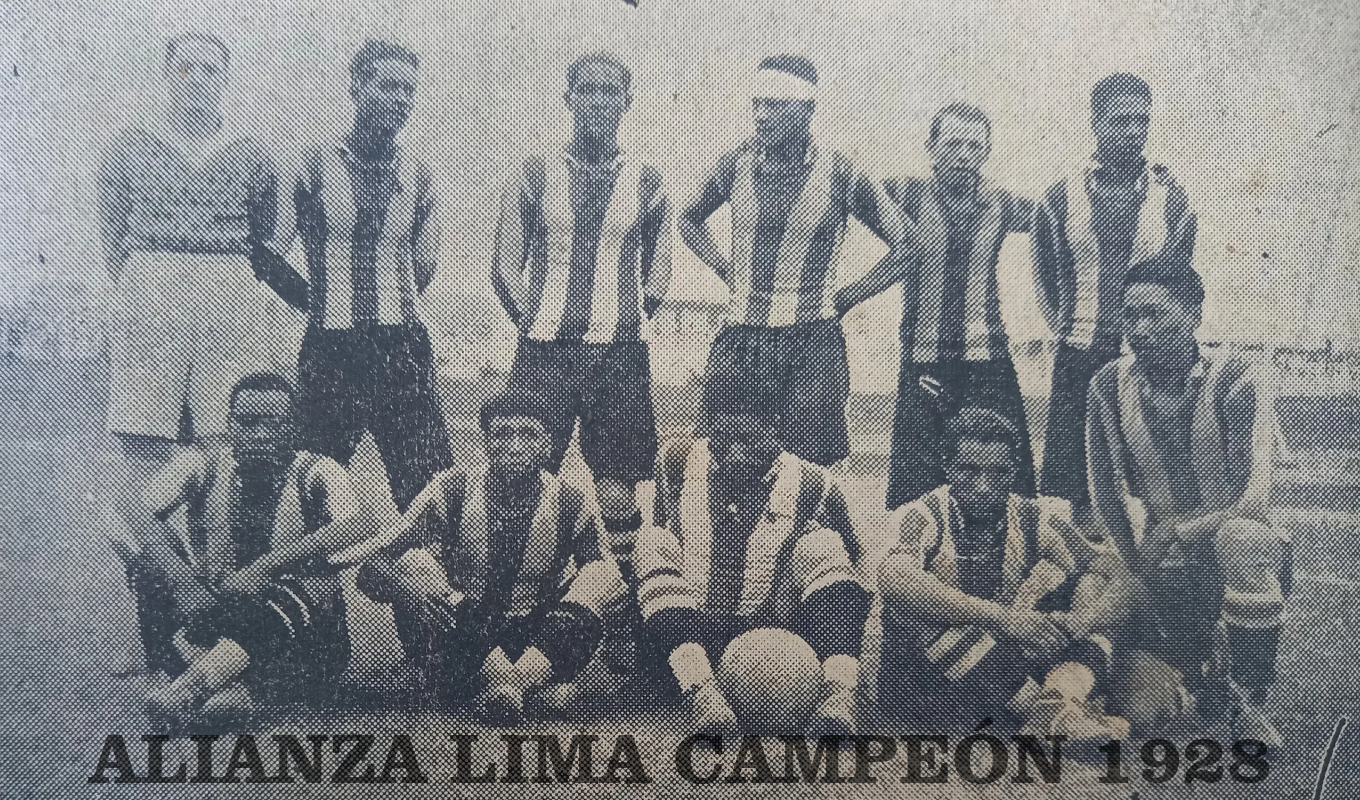
- Alianza Lima, champion
- Season: 1928
- Dates: 27 July 1928 – 1 November 1928
- Champions: Alianza Lima (4th title)
- Runner up: Federación Universitaria
- Relegated: Lawn Tennis de la Exposición; Association Alianza; Alberto Secada; Alianza Callao; José Olaya; Unión FC; Santa Catalina; Jorge Washington
- Top goalscorer: Alejandro Villanueva (3 goals)

The 1928 Primera División was the 13th season of top-flight Peruvian football. A total of 19 teams competed in this league, with Alianza Lima successfully defending their title. The first Superclásico was contested in this season.

== Changes from 1927 ==
=== Structural changes ===
The Peruvian Football Federation invited 11 teams to compete in the league and divided them into two groups. The top two in Group 1 and the top three in Group 2 advanced to the championship group. The relegation system was reintroduced.

=== Promotion ===
11 teams were promoted to compete in the 1928 season. They were Sportivo Unión, Alianza Chorrillos, Santa Catalina, Lawn Tennis, Alberto Secada, Federación Universitaria, Jorge Washington, Alianza Callao, Jose Alaya, Jorge Chávez (C) and Unión.

== Teams ==
=== Team changes ===
Promoted from 1927 División Intermedia (Primera Serie)	Promoted from 1927 División Intermedia (Segunda Serie)	Promoted from 1927 División Intermedia (Tercera Serie)	Invited
▲ Sportivo Unión (1st) ▲ Alberto Secada (2nd) ▲ Lawn Tennis de la Exposición (3rd)	▲ Alianza Callao (1st) ▲ Jorge Chávez (2nd) ▲ Unión Santa Catalina (3rd) ▲ Unión (4th)	▲ Alianza Chorrillos (1st) ▲ Jorge Washington (2nd) ▲ José Olaya (3rd)	▲ Federación Universitaria

=== Stadia and Locations ===
Team	City
Alberto Secada	Callao
Alianza Callao	Callao
Alianza Chorrillos	Chorrillos, Lima
Alianza Lima	La Victoria, Lima
Association Alianza	La Victoria, Lima
Atlético Chalaco	Callao
Ciclista Lima	Cercado de Lima
Circolo Sportivo Italiano	Pueblo Libre, Lima
Federación Universitaria	Cercado de Lima
Jorge Chávez	Callao
Jorge Washington	Callao
José Olaya	Chorrillos, Lima
Lawn Tennis de la Exposición	Jesús María, Lima
Sport Progreso	Rímac, Lima
Sportivo Tarapacá	Cercado de Lima
Sportivo Unión	Cercado de Lima
Unión Buenos Aires	Callao
Unión FC	Cercado de Lima
Unión Santa Catalina	Cercado de Lima

== First stage ==
=== Group 1 ===
Pos	Team	Pld	W	D	L	GF	GA	GD	Pts	Qualification or relegation
1	Alianza Lima	8	8	0	0	26	6	+20	16	Liguilla Final
2	Atlético Chalaco	8	6	0	2	26	15	+11	12	Liguilla Final
3	Sportivo Tarapacá	8	5	1	2	15	6	+9	11	
4	Sportivo Unión	8	4	1	3	11	11	0	9	
5	Alianza Chorrillos	8	3	1	4	14	22	−8	7	
6	Unión Santa Catalina	8	3	0	5	11	13	−2	6	Liguilla de promoción
7	Lawn Tennis de la Exposición	8	2	1	5	12	15	−3	5	1929 Primera B
8	Association Alianza	8	1	2	5	10	17	−7	4	1929 Primera B
9	Alberto Secada	8	1	0	7	4	24	−20	2	1929 Primera B

==== Results ====
Teams play each other once, either home or away. All matches were played in Lima.

Home \ Away	SEC	ACH	ALI	ASS	CHA	TEN	TAR	SUN	USC
Alberto Secada		1–4	2–5			1–4			0–6
Alianza Chorrillos				3–3		3–4	1–3	5–1	
Alianza Lima		9–1		1–0	3–1	3–0			4–1
Association Alianza	1–2					1–1	2–1	0–0	
Atlético Chalaco	2–1	3–0		5–2				2–0	6–0
Lawn Tennis de la Exposición					2–5		2–4		1–3
Sportivo Tarapacá	8–0		1–3		4–1			1–1	
Sportivo Unión	1–0		1–5			2–1			3–2
Unión Santa Catalina		1–2		2–1			0–1		

Updated to match(es) played on 1928. Source: Diario El Comercio, La Prensa and Crónica.
Legend: Blue = home team win; Yellow = draw; Red = away team win.

=== Group 2 ===
Pos	Team	Pld	W	D	L	GF	GA	GD	Pts	Qualification or relegation
1	Sport Progreso	9	7	1	1	14	10	+4	15	Liguilla Final
2	Federación Universitaria	9	5	3	1	20	6	+14	13	Liguilla Final
3	Circolo Sportivo Italiano	9	5	3	1	15	8	+7	13	Liguilla Final
4	Ciclista Lima	9	5	2	2	14	9	+5	12	
5	Unión Buenos Aires	9	5	1	3	14	10	+4	11	
6	Jorge Washington	9	4	1	4	21	9	+12	9	Liguilla de promoción
7	Jorge Chávez	9	4	1	4	12	10	+2	9	Liguilla de promoción
8	Alianza Callao	9	2	2	5	12	14	−2	6	1929 Primera B
9	José Olaya	9	0	1	8	8	29	−21	1	1929 Primera B
10	Unión FC	9	0	1	8	7	32	−25	1	1929 Primera B

==== Results ====
Teams play each other once, either home or away. All matches were played in Lima.

Home \ Away	ACA	CIC	CSI	UNI	JCH	JWA	OLA	PRO	UBA	UFC
Alianza Callao				0–3	0–2	1–4			1–2	
Ciclista Lima	1–1				2–1	2–0	4–1			4–0
Circolo Sportivo Italiano	2–2	4–2		3–1		1–0	2–1			4–0
Federación Universitaria		0–0							2–0	
Jorge Chávez			0–0	0–2			4–3			1–0
Jorge Washington				2–2	4–1		4–0			7–3
José Olaya	2–5			0–7						2–2
Sport Progreso	4–2	3–1	1–0	1–1	3–2	4–2	3–2			
Unión Buenos Aires		0–2	2–2		1–4	2–0	5–0	3–1		4–1
Unión FC	0–7			1–5				1–2		

Updated to match(es) played on 1928. Source: Diario El Comercio, La Prensa and Crónica.
Legend: Blue = home team win; Yellow = draw; Red = away team win.

== Liguilla Final ==
=== Standings ===
Pos	Team	Pld	W	D	L	GF	GA	GD	Pts	Qualification or relegation	ALI	UNI	CHA	PRO	CSI
1	Alianza Lima (C)	4	3	0	1	7	4	+3	6	Title play-off		0–1			3–1
2	Federación Universitaria	4	3	0	1	7	4	+3	6	Title play-off			1–0	1–3	
3	Atlético Chalaco	4	2	0	2	6	6	0	4		1–2			3–2	
4	Sport Progreso	4	1	1	2	8	8	0	3		1–2				2–2
5	Circolo Sportivo Italiano	4	0	1	3	5	11	−6	1			1–4	1–2		

Source: Diario El Comercio, La Prensa and Crónica.
Legend: Blue = home team win; Yellow = draw; Red = away team win.
(C) Champions

=== Results ===
1928	Sport Progreso	2–2	Circolo Sportivo Italiano

1928	Atlético Chalaco	1–2	Alianza Lima

2 September 1928	Federación Universitaria	1–0	Atlético Chalaco	Estadio Víctor Manuel III, Lima
14:15

2 September 1928	Alianza Lima	3–1	Circolo Sportivo Italiano	Estadio Víctor Manuel III, Lima
16:00

9 September 1928	Sport Progreso	1–2	Alianza Lima	Estadio Nacional, Lima

9 September 1928	Circolo Sportivo Italiano	1–4	Federación Universitaria	Estadio Nacional, Lima

16 September 1928	Circolo Sportivo Italiano	1–2	Atlético Chalaco	Estadio Nacional, Lima
14:00

16 September 1928	Federación Universitaria	1–3	Sport Progreso	Estadio Nacional, Lima
15:45

23 September 1928	Atlético Chalaco	3–2	Sport Progreso	Estadio Nacional, Lima
14:00

23 September 1928	Alianza Lima	0–1	Federación Universitaria	Estadio Nacional, Lima
15:45

=== Title play-off ===
==== First leg ====
21 October 1928
15:30

Alianza Lima	1–1	Federación Universitaria
Domingo García 42' (pen.)		Jorge Góngora 65'

Estadio Nacional, Lima
Referee: Domingo Donayre

==== Second leg ====
1 November 1928

Alianza Lima	2–0	Federación Universitaria
Juan Bulnes 46'; Guillermo Rivero 67'

Estadio Nacional, Lima
Referee: Domingo Donayre

Alianza Lima won 3–1 on aggregate.

== Liguilla de promoción ==
It was played with the last three places in the First Division and the 1928 División Intermedia champion, Sporting Tabaco.

=== Standings ===
Pos	Team	Pld	W	D	L	Pts	Qualification or relegation	JCH	TAB	WAS	SCA
1	Jorge Chávez	3	3	0	0	6				—	—
2	Sporting Tabaco	3	2	0	1	4		—			6–0
3	Jorge Washington	3	1	0	2	2	1929 Primera B		—		
4	Unión Santa Catalina	3	0	0	3	0	1929 Primera B			—	

Source: Diario El Comercio, La Prensa and Crónica.
Legend: Blue = home team win; Yellow = draw; Red = away team win.

== See also ==
- 1928 Torneo Interligas
- 1928 Copa Uruguay
- 1928 Campeonato Nacional
