= 1934 Liga Provincial del Callao =

Liga Provincial del Callao
- Season: 1934
- Dates: 16 September 1934 – 25 November 1934
- Champions: Atlético Chalaco (2nd title)
- Relegated: Federico Fernandini; Alianza Frigorífico

The 1934 Liga Provincial del Callao, was the 3rd edition of the top football division in Callao. A total of 7 teams participated in the league.

Atlético Chalaco won the title after beating Alianza Frigorífico in the last round.

== Format ==
- From 1931 until 1934 the results of a reserve teams league were added as bonus points.
- From 1931 until 1942 the points system was W:3, D:2, L:1, walkover:0.

== Teams ==
=== Team changes ===
Promoted from 1933 División Intermedia (Callao)	Relegated from 1933 Liga Provincial del Callao
▲ Atlético Excelsior (1st)	▼ Porteño (7th) ▼ Unión Estrella (8th)

=== Stadia and locations ===
Team	City
Alianza Frigorífico	Callao
Atlético Chalaco	Callao
Atlético Excelsior	Callao
Federico Fernandini	Callao
Jorge Chávez	Callao
Telmo Carbajo	Callao
Unión Buenos Aires	Callao

== League table ==
=== Primeros Equipos ===
Pos	Team	Pld	W	D	L	GF	GA	GD	Pts	Promotion or relegation
1	Atlético Chalaco	6	5	1	0	20	10	+10	17	Champions
2	Telmo Carbajo	6	3	3	0	20	6	+14	15	
3	Atlético Excelsior	6	2	2	2	16	16	0	12	
4	Unión Buenos Aires	6	2	2	2	9	15	−6	12	
5	Jorge Chávez	6	0	5	1	9	11	−2	11	
6	Federico Fernandini	6	1	1	4	8	19	−11	9	
7	Alianza Frigorífico	6	0	2	4	4	9	−5	6	

==== Results ====
Teams play each other once, either home or away. The matches were played only in Callao.

Home \ Away	ALI	CHA	EXC	FED	JCC	TEL	UBA
Alianza Frigorífico		1–3	1–4		1–1		
Atlético Chalaco					5–3	2–2	3–1
Atlético Excelsior		2–3		7–1	1–1		
Federico Fernandini	W.O.	1–4				2–3	
Jorge Chávez				2–2		0–0	2–2
Telmo Carbajo	1–1		8–0				6–1
Unión Buenos Aires	W.O.		2–2	3–2			

Updated to match(es) played on 1934. Source: Diario El Comercio, La Prensa and Crónica.
Legend: Blue = home team win; Yellow = draw; Red = away team win.

=== Tabla Absoluta ===
Pos	Team	Pld	W	D	L	GF	GA	GD	Pts	Resv.	Total	Qualification or relegation
1	Atlético Chalaco (C)	6	5	1	0	20	10	+10	17	3.5	20.5	Champions
2	Telmo Carbajo	6	3	3	0	20	6	+14	15	2	17	
3	Jorge Chávez	6	0	5	1	9	11	−2	11	2	13	
4	Unión Buenos Aires	6	2	2	2	9	15	−6	12	0.75	12.75	
5	Atlético Excelsior	6	2	2	2	16	16	0	12	0.50	12.50	
6	Federico Fernandini	6	1	1	4	8	19	−11	9	1.25	10.25	1935 División Intermedia (Callao)
7	Alianza Frigorífico	6	0	2	4	4	9	−5	6	0.75	6.75	1935 División Intermedia (Callao)

== See also ==
- 1934 Peruvian Primera División
