= Juan Alfonso Valle =

Peruvian footballer (1905–?)

Personal information
- Date of birth: 1905 (age 120–121)
- Place of birth: Peru
- Position: Midfielder

Senior career*
Years	Team	Apps	(Gls)
- Circolo Sportivo Italiano

International career
- Peru
- * Club domestic league appearances and goals

Juan Alfonso Valle (born 1905, death unknown) was a Peruvian footballer who played as a midfielder. He played for Peru in the 1930 FIFA World Cup and for Circolo Sportivo Italiano.
