= 1927 Peruvian Primera División =

Peruvian Primera División
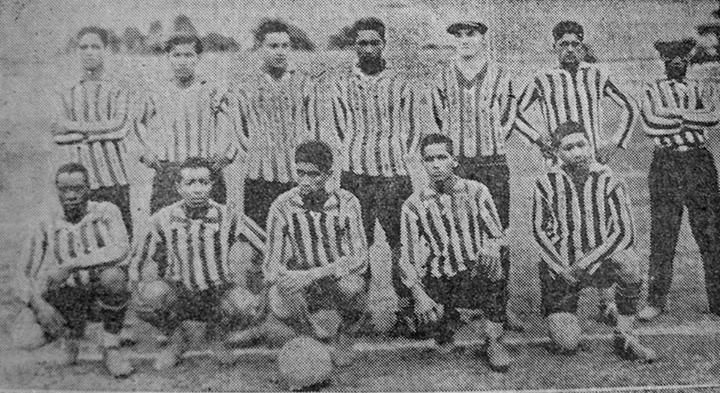
- Alianza Lima, champion
- Season: 1927
- Dates: 22 May 1927 – 26 June 1927
- Champions: Alianza Lima (3rd title)
- Runner up: Unión Buenos Aires
- Relegated: none
- Matches: 11
- Goals: 40 (3.64 per match)

The 1927 Primera División was the 12th season of top-flight Peruvian football. A total of 8 teams competed in the league, with Sport Progreso as defending champion. Alianza Lima won its third Primera División title. Many matches were not played.

== Tournament Overview ==
On June 15, 1927, the FPF, through an official bulletin, ruled to disqualify Association FBC from the entire 1927 season due to the improper registration of player Julio Lores, who belonged to Atlético Chalaco after having played for that club during the 1926 season. Additionally, the team's withdrawal from the field during the match against Atlético Chalaco in the third round was considered an aggravating factor.

On Matchday 6, only one match was played, as the fixture between Sport Progreso and Association FBC did not take place due to the latter's disqualification following the incidents in their match against Atlético Chalaco. Furthermore, the schedule was not modified, as the assembly's decision on the reconsideration request regarding the disqualification was still pending.

The Association FBC merged with the club Unión Ciclista Peruana in September 1927 to form the Ciclista Lima Association. Therefore, the football matches played before that month were kept under the name of Association Football Club.

The Peruvian Football Federation, in Bulletin No. 119 dated January 4, 1928, declared all championships across every division corresponding to the 1927 season officially concluded, proclaiming Alianza Lima as champions, as the club was leading the standings with the highest number of points in the competition.

== Changes from 1926 ==
=== Structural changes ===
For the 1927 season, 8 teams played in the league, a 3-team reduction from the previous season. No relegation took place in this season.

=== Promotion and relegation ===
Jorge Chávez, Teniente Ruiz, Deportivo Nacional, Jorge Washington and Sport José Gálvez were relegated. They were replaced by Association FBC (reinstated) and Association Alianza as 1926 División Intermedia champion.

== Teams ==
=== Team changes ===
| Promoted from 1926 División Intermedia | Reinstated | Relegated from 1926 Primera División |
|---|---|---|
| ▲ Association Alianza (1st) | ▲ Association FBC | ▼ Jorge Chávez (7th) ▼ Teniente Ruiz (8th) ▼ Jorge Washington (9th) ▼ Deportivo Nacional (10th) ▼ Sport José Gálvez (11th) |

=== Stadia and Locations ===
| Team | City |
|---|---|
| Alianza Lima | La Victoria, Lima |
| Association Alianza | La Victoria, Lima |
| Association FBC | Cercado de Lima |
| Atlético Chalaco | Callao |
| Circolo Sportivo Italiano | Pueblo Libre, Lima |
| Sport Progreso | Rímac, Lima |
| Sportivo Tarapacá | Cercado de Lima |
| Unión Buenos Aires | Callao |

== League table ==
=== Standings ===
| Pos | Team | Pld | W | D | L | GF | GA | GD | Pts | Qualification or relegation |
|---|---|---|---|---|---|---|---|---|---|---|
| 1 | Alianza Lima (C) | 3 | 3 | 0 | 0 | 8 | 2 | +6 | 6 | Champions |
| 2 | Unión Buenos Aires | 3 | 2 | 1 | 0 | 8 | 5 | +3 | 5 | |
| 3 | Circolo Sportivo Italiano | 3 | 2 | 0 | 1 | 8 | 5 | +3 | 4 | |
| 4 | Atlético Chalaco | 3 | 2 | 0 | 1 | 4 | 4 | 0 | 4 | |
| 5 | Sportivo Tarapacá | 3 | 0 | 2 | 1 | 4 | 6 | −2 | 2 | |
| 6 | Association Alianza | 3 | 0 | 1 | 2 | 5 | 9 | −4 | 1 | |
| 7 | Sport Progreso | 2 | 0 | 0 | 2 | 3 | 6 | −3 | 0 | |
| 8 | Association FBC | 2 | 0 | 0 | 2 | 0 | 3 | −3 | 0 | |

Source: Diario La Crónica and La Prensa
(C) Champions

== Results ==
The following list is the known results according to what was published in the newspapers El Comercio, La Prensa and La Crónica.

Teams play each other once, either home or away. All matches were played in Lima.

| Home \ Away | ALI | AAL | ASS | CHA | CSI | TAR | PRO | UBA |
|---|---|---|---|---|---|---|---|---|
| Alianza Lima | | | 2–0 | 3–0 | | n.p. | | |
| Association Alianza | n.p. | | | n.p. | | | n.p. | 1–3 |
| Association FBC | | n.p. | | 0–1 | n.p. | n.p. | | |
| Atlético Chalaco | | | | | n.p. | n.p. | 3–1 | |
| Circolo Sportivo Italiano | n.p. | 4–2 | | | | 2–0 | | |
| Sportivo Tarapacá | | 2–2 | | | | | n.p. | |
| Sport Progreso | 2–3 | | n.p. | | n.p. | | | n.p. |
| Unión Buenos Aires | n.p. | | n.p. | n.p. | 3–2 | 2–2 | | |

Updated to match(es) played on 1927. Source: Diario El Comercio, La Prensa and La Crónica
Legend: Blue = home team win; Yellow = draw; Red = away team win.

=== Round 1 ===
| 22 May 1927 | Alianza Lima | 2–0 | Association FBC | Estadio Nacional, Lima |
| | Villavicencio (o.g.); Alberto Montellanos |

| 22 May 1927 | Atlético Chalaco | 3–1 | Sport Progreso | Estadio Nacional, Lima |
| | Telmo Carbajo; Manuel Puente |

| 29 May 1927 | Unión Buenos Aires | 3–2 | Circolo Sportivo Italiano | Estadio Víctor Manuel III, Lima |
| | | | | Referee: Ricardo Arredondo |

| 29 May 1927 | Sportivo Tarapacá | 2–2 | Association Alianza | Estadio Víctor Manuel III, Lima |

=== Round 2 ===
| 12 June 1927 | Alianza Lima | 3–2 | Sport Progreso | Estadio Nacional, Lima |
| 14:00 | José María Lavalle; Alberto Montellanos; Jorge Koochoi | | | Referee: Alberto Benites |

| 12 June 1927 | Atlético Chalaco | 1–0* | Association FBC | Estadio Nacional, Lima |
| 15:45 | | | | Referee: Miguel Serra Hurtado |

* The referee ended the match in the 38th minute, with the score at 1–0 in favor of Atlético Chalaco, after the Association players left the field of play on two occasions.

| 16 June 1927 | Circolo Sportivo Italiano | 4–2 | Association Alianza | Estadio Víctor Manuel III, Lima |
| 14:00 | | | | Referee: Manuel Conde |

| 16 June 1927 | Unión Buenos Aires | 2–2 | Sportivo Tarapacá | Estadio Víctor Manuel III, Lima |
| 15:45 | | | Aguero Beretta | Referee: Miguel Serra Hurtado |

=== Round 3 ===
| 19 June 1927 | Unión Buenos Aires | 3–1 | Association Alianza | Estadio Nacional, Lima |
| 14:00 |

| 19 June 1927 | Circolo Sportivo Italiano | 2–0 | Sportivo Tarapacá | Estadio Nacional, Lima |
| 15:45 | Francisco Sabroso |

| 26 June 1927 | Alianza Lima | 3–0 | Atlético Chalaco | Estadio Víctor Manuel III, Lima |
| 15:45 | Jorge Koochoi; José María Lavalle; Guillermo Rivero | | | Referee: Alberto Benites |

| 26 June 1927 | Sport Progreso | not played | Association FBC | Estadio Víctor Manuel III, Lima |

* On Matchday 6, only one match was played, as the fixture between Sport Progreso and Association FBC did not take place due to the latter's disqualification following the incidents in their match against Atlético Chalaco. Furthermore, the schedule was not modified, as the assembly's decision on the reconsideration request regarding the disqualification was still pending.

== Top scorers ==
| Rank | Player | Club | Goals |
|---|---|---|---|
| 1 | (Peru) Alberto Montellanos | Alianza Lima | 2 |
| 1 | (Peru) José María Lavalle | Alianza Lima | 2 |
| 1 | (Peru) Jorge Koochoi | Alianza Lima | 2 |
| 1 | (Peru) Telmo Carbajo | Atlético Chalaco | 2 |
| 1 | (Peru) Francisco Sabroso | Circolo Sportivo Italiano | 2 |
| 2 | (Peru) Guillermo Rivero | Alianza Lima | 1 |
| 2 | (Peru) Manuel Puente | Atlético Chalaco | 1 |
