= 1933 Liga Provincial del Callao =

Liga Provincial del Callao
- Season: 1933
- Dates: 9 July 1933 – 8 October 1933
- Champions: Alianza Frigorífico (1st title)

The 1933 Liga Provincial del Callao, was the 2nd edition of the top football division in Callao. A total of 8 teams participated in the league.

Alianza Frigorífico won the title after drawing with Telmo Carbajo in the last round.

== Format ==
- From 1931 until 1934 the results of a reserve teams league were added as bonus points.
- From 1931 until 1942 the points system was W:3, D:2, L:1, walkover:0.

== Teams ==
=== Team changes ===
Promoted from
1932 División Intermedia (Callao)
▲ Federico Fernandini (1st)
▲ Jorge Chávez (2nd)
▲ Telmo Carbajo (3rd)
▲ Porteño (4th)
▲ Unión Estrella (5th)

=== Stadia and locations ===
Team	City
Alianza Frigorífico	Callao
Atlético Chalaco	Callao
Federico Fernandini	Callao
Jorge Chávez	Callao
Porteño	Callao
Telmo Carbajo	Callao
Unión Buenos Aires	Callao
Unión Estrella	Callao

== League table ==
=== Primeros Equipos ===
Pos	Team	Pld	W	D	L	GF	GA	GD	Pts	Promotion or relegation
1	Alianza Frigorífico	7	5	2	0	28	9	+19	19	Champions
2	Telmo Carbajo	7	3	3	1	15	6	+9	16	
3	Unión Buenos Aires	7	4	1	2	14	13	+1	16	
4	Jorge Chávez	7	2	4	1	15	13	+2	15	
5	Federico Fernandini	7	3	2	2	14	15	−1	15	
6	Atlético Chalaco	7	3	1	3	16	12	+4	14	
7	Porteño	7	1	1	5	9	17	−8	10	
8	Unión Estrella	7	0	0	7	2	28	−26	7	

==== Results ====
Teams play each other once, either home or away. The matches were played only in Callao.

Home \ Away	ALI	CHA	FED	JCC	POR	TEL	UBA	UES
Alianza Frigorífico			2–2		4–1			7–0
Atlético Chalaco	1–3				5–2		1–2	
Federico Fernandini		0–3				2–1	3–5	
Jorge Chávez	2–6	2–2	2–2		2–2			
Porteño			1–2			0–2		3–0
Telmo Carbajo	1–1	2–0		1–1			2–2	6–0
Unión Buenos Aires	2–5			0–2	2–0			1–0
Unión Estrella		1–4	1–3	0–4				

Updated to match(es) played on 1933. Source: Diario El Comercio, La Prensa and Crónica.
Legend: Blue = home team win; Yellow = draw; Red = away team win.

=== Equipos de Reserva ===
Pos	Team	Pld	Pts	Qualification or relegation
1	Jorge Chávez	7	19	Title Play-off
2	Atlético Chalaco	7	19	Title Play-off
3	Unión Buenos Aires	7	15	
4	Porteño	7	15	
5	Telmo Carbajo	7	12	
6	Alianza Frigorífico	7	11	
7	Federico Fernandini	7	10	
8	Unión Estrella	7	8	

==== Title Play-off ====
Team 1	Score	Team 2
Jorge Chávez	5–2	Atlético Chalaco

=== Tabla Absoluta ===
Pos	Team	Pld	W	D	L	GF	GA	GD	Pts	Resv.	Total	Qualification or relegation
1	Alianza Frigorífico (C)	7	5	2	0	28	9	+19	19	2.75	21.75	Champions
2	Jorge Chávez	7	2	4	1	15	13	+2	15	4.75	19.75	
3	Unión Buenos Aires	7	4	1	2	14	13	+1	16	3.75	19.75	
4	Telmo Carbajo	7	3	3	1	15	6	+9	16	3	19	
5	Atlético Chalaco	7	3	1	3	16	12	+4	14	4.75	18.75	
6	Federico Fernandini	7	3	2	2	14	15	−1	15	2.5	17.5	
7	Porteño (R)	7	1	1	5	9	17	−8	10	3.75	13.75	1934 División Intermedia (Callao)
8	Unión Estrella (R)	7	0	0	7	2	28	−26	7	2	9	1934 División Intermedia (Callao)

== See also ==
- 1933 Peruvian Primera División
- 1933 Peruvian División Intermedia
