= 1930 Peruvian Primera División =

Peruvian Primera División
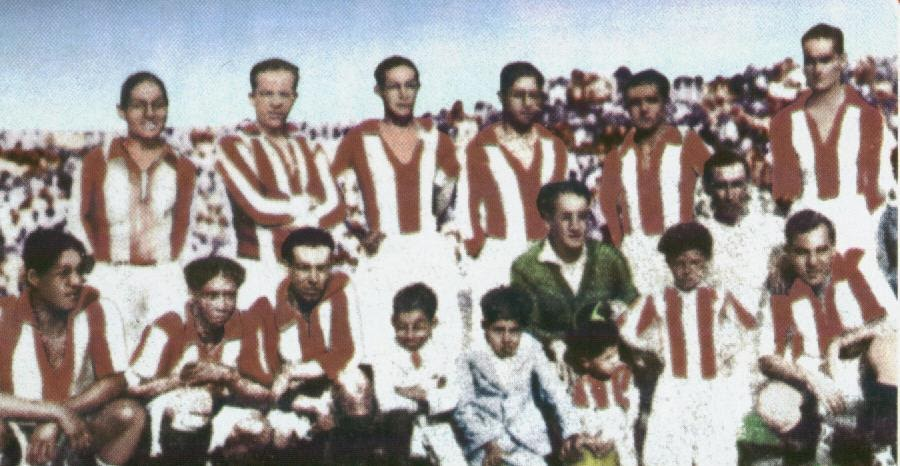
- Atlético Chalaco, champion
- Season: 1930
- Dates: 14 September 1930 – 7 December 1930
- Champions: Atlético Chalaco (1st title)
- Runner up: Alianza Lima
- Relegated: Sport Progreso
- Matches: 24
- Top goalscorer: Manuel Puente (4 goals)

The 1930 Primera División was the 15th season of top-flight Peruvian football. A total of 12 teams competed in this league, with Atlético Chalaco winning its first league title.

== Changes from 1929 ==
=== Structural changes ===
The number of teams was reduced from 13 to 12. The 12 teams were divided into 3 groups of 4 and the winner of each group advanced to the championship group. The last-placed team of each group would play in a relegation group with the last-placed team being relegated.

=== Promotion and relegation ===
Jorge Chávez and Alianza Chorrillos placed 11th and 12th place respectively in the 1929 season and were relegated. Lawn Tennis was promoted in their place.

== Teams ==
=== Team changes ===
Promoted from 1929 Primera B	Relegated from 1929 Primera División
▲ Lawn Tennis de la Exposición (1st)	▼ Jorge Chávez (11th) ▼ Alianza Chorrillos (12th)

=== Stadia and Locations ===
Team	City
Alianza Lima	La Victoria, Lima
Atlético Chalaco	Callao
Ciclista Lima	Cercado de Lima
Circolo Sportivo Italiano	Pueblo Libre, Lima
Escuela de Hidroaviación	Ancón, Lima
Federación Universitaria	Cercado de Lima
Lawn Tennis de la Exposición	Jesús María, Lima
Sport Progreso	Rímac, Lima
Sporting Tabaco	Rímac, Lima
Sportivo Tarapacá Ferrocarril	Cercado de Lima
Sportivo Unión	Cercado de Lima
Unión Buenos Aires	Callao

== First stage ==
=== Group 1 ===
==== Standings ====
Pos	Team	Pld	W	D	L	GF	GA	GD	Pts	Qualification	ALI	CSI	HID	SUN
1	Alianza Lima	3	3	0	0	8	2	+6	6	Liguilla Final			2–1	4–1
2	Circolo Sportivo Italiano	3	1	1	1	3	4	−1	3		0–2			
3	Escuela de Hidroaviación	3	0	2	1	4	5	−1	2			1–1		2–2
4	Sportivo Unión	3	0	1	2	4	8	−4	1	Liguilla Descenso		1–2		

Updated to match(es) played on 1930. Source: Diario El Comercio, La Prensa and Crónica.
Legend: Blue = home team win; Yellow = draw; Red = away team win.

==== Results ====
14 September 1930	Sportivo Unión	1–2	Circolo Sportivo Italiano	Estadio Nacional, Lima

14 September 1930	Alianza Lima	2–1	Escuela de Hidroaviación	Estadio Nacional, Lima
	Alejandro Villanueva 51'; Demetrio Neyra 81'		Lizarbe 58'	Referee: Donaire

* As Alianza Lima's 2–1 victory over Escuela de Hidroaviación was considered to have been secured by an illegitimate penalty goal, the two teams agreed to play a friendly rematch on Wednesday, 24 September. Alianza Lima won the match by a score of 5–1

5 October 1930	Escuela de Hidroaviación	2–2	Sportivo Unión	Estadio Víctor Manuel III, Lima

5 October 1930	Circolo Sportivo Italiano	0–2	Alianza Lima	Estadio Víctor Manuel III, Lima
			Alejandro Villanueva 35'; Demetrio Neyra 55'

2 November 1930	Escuela de Hidroaviación	1–1	Circolo Sportivo Italiano	Estadio Nacional, Lima
12:30

2 November 1930	Alianza Lima	4–1	Sportivo Unión	Estadio Nacional, Lima
14:10	Alejandro Villanueva 15'; José María Lavalle 18'; Demetrio Neyra 55'; Alberto Montellanos 69'		Vidal 73'

=== Group 2 ===
==== Standings ====
Pos	Team	Pld	W	D	L	GF	GA	GD	Pts	Qualification	UNI	CIC	UBA	PRO
1	Federación Universitaria	3	2	1	0	6	1	+5	5	Liguilla Final				3–0
2	Ciclista Lima	3	2	0	1	6	4	+2	4		0–2			3–0
3	Unión Buenos Aires	3	0	2	1	6	7	−1	2		1–1	2–3		
4	Sport Progreso	3	0	1	2	3	9	−6	1	Liguilla Descenso			3–3	

Updated to match(es) played on 1930. Source: Diario El Comercio, La Prensa and Crónica.
Legend: Blue = home team win; Yellow = draw; Red = away team win.

==== Results ====
21 September 1930	Sport Progreso	3–3	Unión Buenos Aires	Estadio Nacional, Lima
14:00

21 September 1930	Ciclista Lima	0–2	Federación Universitaria	Estadio Nacional, Lima
15:45

12 October 1930	Unión Buenos Aires	2–3	Ciclista Lima	Estadio Víctor Manuel III, Lima

12 October 1930	Federación Universitaria	3–0	Sport Progreso	Estadio Víctor Manuel III, Lima

9 November 1930	Ciclista Lima	0–3 (annulled)	Sport Progreso	Estadio Nacional, Lima
14:00

* The match between Ciclista Lima and Sport Progreso, originally played on 9 November 1930, was declared void after Sport Progreso arrived late for the fixture. The match was subsequently replayed on 23 November.

9 November 1930	Unión Buenos Aires	1–1	Federación Universitaria	Estadio Nacional, Lima

23 November 1930	Ciclista Lima	3–0	Sport Progreso	Estadio Nacional, Lima

=== Group 3 ===
==== Standings ====
Pos	Team	Pld	W	D	L	GF	GA	GD	Pts	Qualification	CHA	TAB	LTE	TFE
1	Atlético Chalaco	3	3	0	0	6	2	+4	6	Liguilla Final		2–1		3–1
2	Sporting Tabaco	3	2	0	1	6	4	+2	4				2–0	3–2
3	Lawn Tennis de la Exposición	3	1	0	2	4	3	+1	2		0–1			
4	Sportivo Tarapacá	3	0	0	3	3	10	−7	0	Liguilla Descenso			0–4	

Updated to match(es) played on 1930. Source: Diario El Comercio, La Prensa and Crónica.
Legend: Blue = home team win; Yellow = draw; Red = away team win.

==== Results ====
28 September 1930	Sportivo Tarapacá	0–4	Lawn Tennis de la Exposición	Estadio Nacional, Lima

28 September 1930	Atlético Chalaco	2–1	Sporting Tabaco	Estadio Nacional, Lima
	Manuel Puente 3'; Miguel Arana 12'		Oyárzabal 23'

17 October 1930	Lawn Tennis de la Exposición	0–1	Atlético Chalaco	Estadio Nacional, Lima
			José Miñán 46'

26 October 1930	Sporting Tabaco	3–2	Sportivo Tarapacá	Estadio Nacional, Lima

16 November 1930	Atlético Chalaco	3–1	Sportivo Tarapacá	Estadio Víctor Manuel III, Lima
	Ernesto Niezen 24'; Juan Rivero 60'; José Miñán		Aranda 29'

16 November 1930	Sporting Tabaco	2–0	Lawn Tennis de la Exposición	Estadio Víctor Manuel III, Lima

== Liguilla Descenso ==
=== Standings ===
Pos	Team	Pld	W	D	L	GF	GA	GD	Pts	Relegation	SUN	TFE	PRO
1	Sportivo Unión	2	1	1	0	7	3	+4	3				4–0
2	Sportivo Tarapacá	2	0	2	0	5	5	0	2		3–3		
3	Sport Progreso (R)	2	0	1	1	2	6	−4	1	1931 División Intermedia		2–2	

Updated to match(es) played on 1930. Source: Diario El Comercio, La Prensa and Crónica.
Legend: Blue = home team win; Yellow = draw; Red = away team win.
(R) Relegated

=== Results ===
23 November 1930	Sportivo Tarapacá	3–3	Sportivo Unión	Estadio Nacional, Lima

30 November 1930	Sport Progreso	2–2	Sportivo Tarapacá

7 December 1930	Sportivo Unión	4–0	Sport Progreso	Estadio Nacional, Lima

== Liguilla Final ==
=== Standings ===
Pos	Team	Pld	W	D	L	GF	GA	GD	Pts	Qualification
1	Atlético Chalaco (C)	2	2	0	0	4	2	+2	4	Champions
2	Alianza Lima	2	0	1	1	2	3	−1	1	
3	Federación Universitaria	2	0	1	1	2	3	−1	1	

(C) Champions

=== Results ===
23 November 1930

Atlético Chalaco	2–1	Federación Universitaria
Manuel Puente 29'; José Miñán 50'	Report	Mario Pacheco 13'

Estadio Nacional, Lima
Referee: Maúrtua
30 November 1930

Alianza Lima	1–1	Federación Universitaria
José María Lavalle 49'	Report	Juan Cárpena 5'

Estadio Nacional, Lima
Referee: Antonio Serra
7 December 1930

Atlético Chalaco	2–1	Alianza Lima
Manuel Puente 56' 81'	Report	Jorge Koochoi 27'

Estadio Nacional, Lima
Referee: Charles Pool

== Top scorers ==
Rank	Player	Club	Goals
1	(Peru) Manuel Puente	Atlético Chalaco	4
2	(Peru) José Miñán	Atlético Chalaco	3

== Torneo Equipos de Reserva ==
Alongside the Primera División championship, the Reserve Teams Tournament was played, featuring the reserve players of top-flight clubs. However, unlike the 1931–1934 period, this competition did not grant any bonus points to the first team.

=== Standings ===
Pos	Team	Pld	W	D	L	Pts	Qualification
1	Federación Universitaria	11	9	1	1	19	Champions
2	Alianza Lima	11	9	1	1	19	
3	Unión Buenos Aires	11	6	3	2	15	
4	Lawn Tennis de la Exposición	11	6	2	3	14	
5	Sporting Tabaco	11	6	1	4	13	
6	Circolo Sportivo Italiano	11	5	3	3	13	
7	Sportivo Unión	11	6	0	5	12	
8	Sportivo Tarapacá Ferrocarril	11	4	0	7	8	
9	Atlético Chalaco	11	3	1	7	7	
10	Ciclista Lima	11	3	0	8	6	
11	Sport Progreso	11	2	0	9	4	
12	Escuela de Hidroaviación	11	1	0	10	2	

=== Title Playoff ===
Federación Universitaria	3–1	Alianza Lima

== Torneo Equipos Juveniles ==
=== Standings ===
Pos	Team	Pld	W	D	L	Pts	Qualification
1	Lawn Tennis de la Exposición	11	10	1	0	21	Champions
2	Circolo Sportivo Italiano	11	7	3	1	17	
3	Unión Buenos Aires	11	7	0	4	14	
4	Alianza Lima	11	6	2	3	14	
5	Atlético Chalaco	11	6	1	4	13	
6	Federación Universitaria	11	5	2	4	12	
7	Sportivo Tarapacá Ferrocarril	11	5	2	4	12	
8	Ciclista Lima	11	4	2	5	10	
9	Sport Progreso	11	3	2	6	8	
10	Sportivo Unión	11	3	1	7	7	
11	Sporting Tabaco	11	1	0	10	2	
12	Escuela de Hidroaviación	11	0	0	11	0	

== See also ==
- 1930 Peruvian División Intermedia
