= 1932 Peruvian Primera División =

Peruvian Primera División
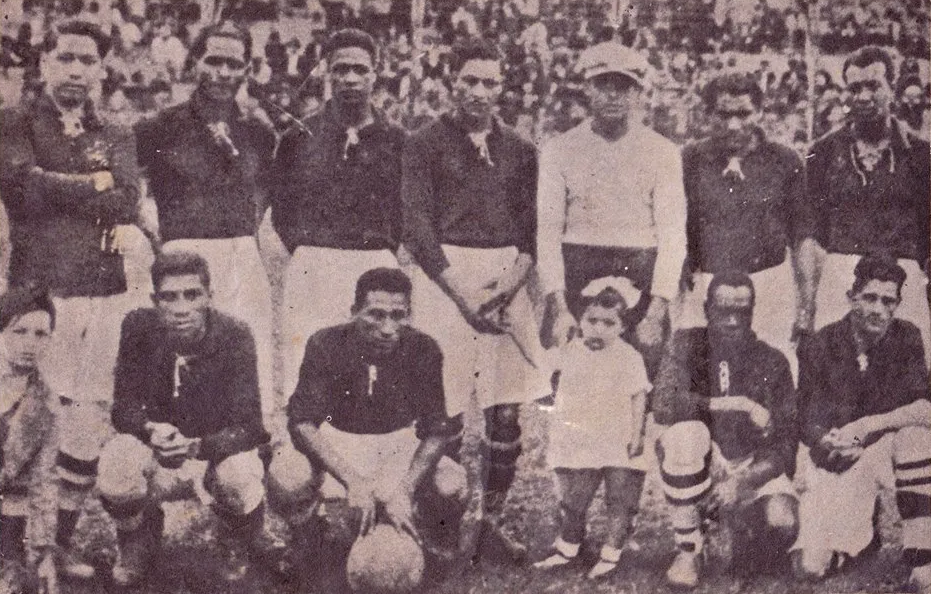
- Alianza Lima, champion
- Season: 1932
- Dates: 19 June 1932 – 2 October 1932
- Champions: Alianza Lima (6th title)
- Runner up: Federación Universitaria
- Relegated: none
- Matches: 28
- Goals: 116 (4.14 per match)
- Top goalscorer: Teodoro Fernández (11 goals)

The 1932 season of the Peruvian Primera División, was the 17th season of top-flight Peruvian football. A total of eight teams competed in this league. The national champions were Alianza Lima.

No relegated team, because First Division grew to 10 teams for 1933.

- Atlético Chalaco, Atlético Frigorífico and Unión Buenos Aires leave the League to form the 1932 Liga Provincial del Callao.
- Hidroaviación disappeared after losing the support of the Escuela de Hidroaviación de Ancón.
- Lawn Tennis de la Exposición decided to disenroll from the Peruvian Football Federation.

== Format ==
- From 1931 until 1934 the results of a reserve teams league were added as bonus points.
- From 1931 until 1942 the points system was W:3, D:2, L:1, walkover:0.

== Teams ==
=== Team changes ===
Promoted from 1931 División Intermedia (1931 Liguilla de Promoción winner)	Retired	Disaffiliated	Disappeared
▲ Sport Progreso (1st)	▼ Atlético Chalaco ▼ Alianza Frigorífico ▼ Unión Buenos Aires	▼ Lawn Tennis de la Exposición	▼ Hidroaviación

=== Stadia and Locations ===
Team	City
Alianza Lima	La Victoria, Lima
Ciclista Lima	Cercado de Lima
Circolo Sportivo Italiano	Pueblo Libre, Lima
Federación Universitaria	Cercado de Lima
Sport Progreso	Rímac, Lima
Sporting Tabaco	Rímac, Lima
Sportivo Tarapacá Ferrocarril	Cercado de Lima
Sportivo Unión	Cercado de Lima

== Torneo Primeros Equipos ==
=== Standings ===
Pos	Team	Pld	W	D	L	GF	GA	GD	Pts	Qualification
1	Alianza Lima	7	7	0	0	26	2	+24	21	Champions
2	Federación Universitaria	7	5	0	2	21	4	+17	17	
3	Sporting Tabaco	7	4	1	2	20	9	+11	16	
4	Ciclista Lima	7	2	2	3	18	17	+1	13	
5	Sport Progreso	7	2	2	3	9	17	−8	13	
6	Sportivo Unión	7	2	2	3	11	20	−9	13	
7	Sportivo Tarapacá Ferrocarril	7	0	3	4	9	17	−8	10	
8	Circolo Sportivo Italiano	7	1	0	6	2	30	−28	9	

=== Results ===
Teams play each other once, either home or away. All matches were played in Lima.

Home \ Away	ALI	CIC	CSI	UNI	PRO	TAB	SUN	TAR
Alianza Lima				1–0	3–0		7–0	2–0
Ciclista Lima	0–6					0–0	2–3	
Circolo Sportivo Italiano	1–5	0–3			0–4			
Federación Universitaria		4–0	8–0				4–1	3–0
Sport Progreso		0–9		0–1		2–1		
Sporting Tabaco	1–2		9–0	2–1				4–2
Sportivo Unión			1–0		2–2	0–1		
Sportivo Tarapacá Ferrocarril		2–2	0–1		1–1		4–4	

Updated to match(es) played on 1932. Source: Diario El Comercio, La Prensa and Crónica.
Legend: Blue = home team win; Yellow = draw; Red = away team win.

== Torneo Equipos de Reserva ==
=== Standings ===
Pos	Team	Pld	W	D	L	Pts	Qualification
1	Federación Universitaria	7	6	1	0	20	Champions
2	Alianza Lima	7	5	1	1	18	
3	Sporting Tabaco	7	3	2	2	15	
4	Ciclista Lima	7	2	3	2	14	
5	Circolo Sportivo Italiano	7	3	0	4	13	
6	Sportivo Tarapacá Ferrocarril	7	1	3	3	12	
7	Sportivo Unión	7	0	4	3	11	
8	Sport Progreso	7	0	2	5	9	

== Tabla Absoluta ==
Pos	Team	Pld	W	D	L	GF	GA	GD	Pts	Resv.	Total	Qualification or relegation
1	Alianza Lima (C)	7	7	0	0	26	2	+24	21	4.50	25.5	Champions
2	Federación Universitaria	7	5	0	2	21	4	+17	17	5	22	
3	Sporting Tabaco	7	4	1	2	20	9	+11	16	3.75	19.75	
4	Ciclista Lima	7	2	2	3	18	17	+1	13	3.5	16.5	
5	Sportivo Unión	7	2	2	3	11	20	−9	13	2.75	15.75	
6	Sport Progreso	7	2	3	3	9	17	−8	13	2.25	15.25	
7	Sportivo Tarapacá Ferrocarril	7	0	3	4	9	17	−8	10	3	13	
8	Circolo Sportivo Italiano	7	1	0	6	2	30	−28	9	3.25	12.25	

== See also ==
- 1932 Liga Provincial del Callao
