= 2009–10 Liga Nacional Superior de Voleibol Femenino =

Liga Nacional Superior de Voleibol Femenino
- Association: FPV
- League: Liga Peruana de Vóley Femenino
- Sport: Volleyball
- Duration: May 21, 2009 to January 31, 2010
- Teams: 16
- Finals champions: Géminis
- Runners-up: Regatas Lima

Seasons
- ← 2008–09 2010–11 →

The 2009–10 Liga Nacional Superior de Voleibol Femenino (Spanish for: 2009-10 Women's Senior National Volleyball League) or 2009-10 LNSVF was the 8th official season of the Peruvian Volleyball League. Géminis won the league championship and qualified to the Women's South American Volleyball Club Championship.

== Competition format ==
The tournament was played under an "Apertura and Clausura" format, followed by a Final Four round involving the top four teams of the season to determine the overall champion.

== Cuadrangular Final ==
=== Ranking ===
Pos	Team	Pld	W	L	Pts	SPW	SPL	SPR	SW	SL	SR	Qualification
1	Géminis	0	0	0	0	0	0	—	0	0	—	Champion
2	Regatas Lima	0	0	0	0	0	0	—	0	0	—	
3	Divino Maestro	0	0	0	0	0	0	—	0	0	—	
4	Circolo Sportivo Italiano	0	0	0	0	0	0	—	0	0	—	

=== Results ===
Date		Score		Set 1	Set 2	Set 3	Set 4	Set 5	Total	Report
29 Jan	Regatas Lima	3–0	Divino Maestro	25–17	25–19	25–18			75–54	
29 Jan	Géminis	3–1	Circolo Sportivo Italiano	19–25	25–16	26–24	25–14		95–79	
30 Jan	Géminis	–	Divino Maestro	–	–	–			–	
30 Jan	Regatas Lima	–	Circolo Sportivo Italiano	–	–	–			–	
31 Jan	Divino Maestro	3–0	Circolo Sportivo Italiano	25–21	25–21	25–23			75–65	
31 Jan	Regatas Lima	1–3	Géminis	25–17	18–25	19–25	18–25		80–92	

== Final standing ==
Rank	Team
1st place, gold medalist(s)	Géminis
2nd place, silver medalist(s)	Regatas Lima
3rd place, bronze medalist(s)	Divino Maestro
4	Circolo Sportivo Italiano

Team qualified for the 2011 South American Club Championship
Team lost A1 category

== Individual awards ==
- Most valuable player
  - (Peru) Patricia Soto (Regatas Lima)
- Best spiker
  - (Peru) Patricia Soto (Regatas Lima)
- Best setter
  - (Peru) Jéssica Tejada (Circolo Sportivo Italiano)
- Best blocker
  - (Peru) Sara Joya (Deportivo Géminis)
- Best server
  - (Peru) Sheyla Quiróz (Latino Amisa)
- Best digger
  - (Peru) Miriam Patiño (Túpac Amaru)
- Best receiver
  - (Peru) Andreína Ruiz (Latino Amisa)
- Best libero
  - (Peru) Daniela Uribe (Deportivo Alianza)
- Rookie of the year
  - (Peru) María Fátima Acosta (Deportivo Géminis)
- Best manager
  - (Peru) Rolando Díaz (Universidad César Vallejo)
