= 1932 Liga Provincial del Callao =

Liga Provincial del Callao
- Season: 1932
- Dates: 3 July 1932 – 9 October 1932
- Champions: Atlético Chalaco (1st title)
- Matches: 6
- Goals: 31 (5.17 per match)

The 1932 Liga Provincial del Callao, was the 1st edition of the top football division in Callao, established after the Callao clubs, due to economic and non-sporting reasons, separated from the Liga Provincial de Lima (Peruvian Primera División) across its different categories to form an independent league. A total of 3 teams participated in the league.

Atlético Chalaco won the title after beating Unión Buenos Aires in the last round.

== Background ==
In February 1932, most of the Callao clubs that were competing at the time in the Liga Provincial de Lima (Peruvian Primera División) League system withdrew and formed their own football league. The Liga Provincial del Callao was officially established on April 1, 1932, incorporating clubs such as Atlético Chalaco, Alianza Frigorífico, and Unión Buenos Aires.

In the league’s first edition, there was no relegation due to the limited number of participating teams. For the following season, the clubs Telmo Carbajo, Porteño, and Unión Estrella were invited to join. Additionally, the two best teams from the 1932 División Intermedia (Callao) — Federico Fernandini and Jorge Chávez — were promoted.

== Format ==
- From 1931 until 1942 the points system was W:3, D:2, L:1, walkover:0.

== Teams ==
=== Stadia and locations ===
Team	City
Alianza Frigorífico	Callao
Atlético Chalaco	Callao
Unión Buenos Aires	Callao

== League table ==
=== Standings ===
Pos	Team	Pld	W	D	L	GF	GA	GD	Pts	Promotion or relegation
1	Atlético Chalaco (C)	4	2	1	1	14	7	+7	9	Champions
2	Alianza Frigorífico	4	1	3	0	10	9	+1	9	
3	Unión Buenos Aires	4	0	2	2	7	15	−8	6	

(C) Champions

==== Results ====
Teams play each other once, either home or away. The matches were played only in Callao.

Home \ Away	ALI	CHA	UBA
Alianza Frigorífico		3–2	1–1
Atlético Chalaco	2–2		6–2
Unión Buenos Aires	4–4	0–4	

Updated to match(es) played on 1932. Source: Diario El Comercio, La Prensa and Crónica.
Legend: Blue = home team win; Yellow = draw; Red = away team win.

== See also ==
- 1932 Peruvian Primera División
