= Sportivo Tarapacá Ferrocarril =

Peruvian football club

- Full name: Sportivo Tarapacá Ferrocarril
- Founded: 1911
- Dissolved: c. 1938; 88 years ago
- Ground: Estadio Nacional; Lima, Peru
- Capacity: 45,000
Home colours

Sportivo Tarapacá Ferrocarril was a Peruvian football club, located in the city of Lima.

The club was founded with the name of club Sportivo Tarapacá and played in Peruvian Primera Division from 1926 until 1937.

== History ==
The club was founded on October 15, 1911, in Callao under the name Club Sportivo Tarapacá by migrants from the province of Tarapacá. In its early years, it played friendly matches against teams from Callao. Sportivo Tarapacá was also one of the pioneers in the creation of the Callao League, an initiative that initially did not materialize but was eventually established in the 1920s under the organization of the Asociación Deportiva Chalaca.

In 1926, the club competed in the Peruvian Primera División, in the first tournament organized by the Peruvian Football Federation (FPF), finishing in a notable third place. The following year, a Callao representative team faced Real Madrid of Spain in a friendly match held at the Estadio Nacional de Lima. Sportivo Tarapacá contributed its standout player, Santiago Ulloa, to that squad, which was defeated 1–4. In 1928, the club affiliated with one of the Lima leagues.

In 1930, the so-called “Combinado Pacífico” team was formed, featuring top Peruvian and Chilean players, and undertook a tour across Europe. Sportivo Tarapacá contributed the player Antonio Maquilón to this squad. That same year, the club avoided relegation by winning the relegation playoff against Sportivo Unión and Sport Progreso.

In 1931, the club received support from the railway company, which led to a name change to Centro Sportivo Tarapacá del Ferrocarril Central.

During the 1932 season, the club fought to remain in the top division against Circolo Sportivo Italiano, ultimately securing its place thanks to a better cumulative record. It later competed in the 1935 Primera A, finishing in the third-to-last position. The club remained in the top division until 1937, when it finished last and was relegated to the Liga Provincial de Lima. The following year, it transferred its league place to Centro Iqueño, which had been competing in a lower division.

== Honours ==
=== Youth team ===
Type	Competition	Titles	Runner-up	Winning years	Runner-up years
National (League)	Torneo Equipos de Reserva	1	—	1933	—

== Statistics and results in First Division ==
=== League history ===
Season	Div.	Pos.	Pl.	W	D	L	GF	GA	P	Notes
1927	1st	5	3	0	2	1	5	7	2	5/8 Regular Season
1928	1st	7	11	5	1	2	15	6	11	7/18 Regular Season
1929	1st	4	11	7	1	3	26	19	15	4/12 Regular Season
1930	1st	12	3	0	0	3	3	10	0	12/12 Regular Season
1931	1st	6	11	4	2	5	20	25	21	6/12 Regular Season
1932	1st	7	7	0	3	4	9	17	10	7/8 Regular Season
1933	1st	6	9	3	1	5	17	18	16	6/10 Regular Season
1934	1st	5	8	3	3	2	11	7	3	5/9 Regular Season
1935	1st	4	2	0	1	1	3	6	3	4/5 Regular Season
1935	1st	10	9	0	1	8	6	24	10	10/10 Regular Season

== See also ==
- List of football clubs in Peru
- Peruvian football league system
