= Tulio Quiñones =

Peruvian footballer

Personal information
- Place of birth: Costa Rica
- Position: Forward

Senior career*
Years	Team	Apps	(Gls)
- Circolo Sportivo Italiano
1947	Deportivo Municipal		
1947–1949	Albinegros de Orizaba		
1949–1951	C.D. Veracruz		
1952–1953	Club Necaxa		
- Porvenir Miraflores

International career
1953	Peru		
- * Club domestic league appearances and goals

Tulio Quiñones was a professional footballer who played as forward. Born in Costa Rica, he played for the Peru national team.

== Biography ==
Born in Costa Rica, Quiñones emigrated to Peru, where he joined Circolo Sportivo Italiano, followed by Deportivo Municipal.

In 1947, he moved to Mexico, where he remained until 1953. He had the opportunity to play for Albinegros de Orizaba, C.D. Veracruz, and Club Necaxa. It was with the latter that he distinguished himself, finishing as the top scorer in the Mexican league during the 1953 season (14 goals).

He returned to Peru and finished his career with Porvenir Miraflores, where he excelled in the Peruvian Second Division. In fact, he was the top scorer in the Second Division in 1955 (10 goals) and won the championship the following year.

He also played for the Peruvian national team in 1953.

== Honours ==
Club Necaxa

- Liga MX Top scorer: 1953 (14 goals)

Porvenir Miraflores

- Peruvian Segunda División: 1956
- Peruvian Segunda División Top scorer: 1955 (10 goals)
