= Lizardo Rodríguez Nue =

Peruvian footballer

Personal information
- Date of birth: 30 August 1910
- Place of birth: Peru
- Position: Forward

Senior career*
Years	Team	Apps	(Gls)
- Sport Progreso

International career
- Peru
- * Club domestic league appearances and goals

Lizardo Rodríguez Nue (born 30 August 1910, date of death unknown) was a Peruvian footballer who played for Peru at the 1930 FIFA World Cup. He also played for Sport Progreso. Rodríguez is deceased.
