= 1930 Peruvian División Intermedia =

División Intermedia
- Season: 1930
- Champions: Alianza Frigorífico
- Runner up: Alianza Cóndor
- Relegated: Teniente Ruiz; Alianza Chorrillos; Peruvian Boys

The 1930 Peruvian División Intermedia, the second division of Peruvian football (soccer), was played by 20 teams. The tournament winner, Alianza Frigorífico was promoted to the 1931 Peruvian Primera División.

== Teams ==
=== Team changes ===
Transferred from 1929 División Intermedia	Transferred from 1929 Primera B		Relegated from 1929 Primera División
▲ Intelectual Raymondi (1st - Serie A) ▲ Sportivo Uruguay (1st - Serie B) ▲ Teniente Ruiz (2nd - Serie B) ▲ Miguel Grau (3rd - Serie B)	▲ Alianza Cóndor ▲ Alianza Frigorífico ▲ Atlético Lusitania ▲ Federico Fernandini ▲ Jesús M. Salazar ▲ José Olaya ▲ Juventud Perú	▲ Peruvian Boys ▲ Sport Inca ▲ Unión Carbone ▲ Unión Estrella ▲ Unión FC ▲ Unión Lazo ▲ Unión Santa Catalina	▼ Jorge Chávez (11th) ▼ Alianza Chorrillos (12th)

=== Stadia and locations ===
Team	City
Alianza Chorrillos	Chorrillos, Lima
Alianza Cóndor	La Victoria, Lima
Alianza Frigorífico	Callao
Atlético Lusitania	Cercado de Lima
Federico Fernandini	Callao
Intelectual Raimondi	Cercado de Lima
Jesús M. Salazar	Callao
José Olaya	Chorrillos, Lima
Juventud Perú	Cercado de Lima
Jorge Chávez	Callao
Miguel Grau	Rímac, Lima
Peruvian Boys	Cercado de Lima
Sport Inca	Rímac, Lima
Sportivo Uruguay	Cercado de Lima
Teniente Ruiz	Cercado de Lima
Unión Carbone	Cercado de Lima
Unión Estrella	Callao
Unión FC	Cercado de Lima
Unión Lazo	Cercado de Lima
Unión Santa Catalina	Cercado de Lima

== League table ==
=== Standings ===
Pos	Team	Pld	W	D	L	Pts	Qualification or relegation
1	Alianza Frigorífico (C)	19	17	2	0	36	1931 Primera División
2	Alianza Cóndor	19	14	2	3	30	
3	Federico Fernandini	19	9	7	3	25	
4	Sportivo Uruguay	19	11	1	7	23	
5	Sport Inca	19	9	5	5	23	
6	Jorge Chávez	19	8	7	4	23	
7	Unión Estrella	19	7	6	6	20	
8	Juventud Perú	19	9	1	9	19	
9	Unión Lazo	19	9	1	9	19	
10	Atlético Lusitania	19	8	3	8	19	
11	Intelectual Raymondi	19	8	3	8	19	
12	Unión Santa Catalina	19	7	2	10	16	
13	Miguel Grau	19	6	4	9	16	
14	Jesús M. Salazar	19	5	6	8	16	
15	José Olaya	19	3	9	7	15	
16	Unión Carbone	19	7	0	12	14	
17	Unión FC	19	4	6	9	14	
18	Teniente Ruiz (R)	19	4	4	11	12	1931 Segunda División Provincial de Lima
19	Alianza Chorrillos (R)	19	3	6	10	12	1931 Segunda División Provincial de Lima
20	Peruvian Boys (R)	19	2	5	12	9	1931 Segunda División Provincial de Lima

(C) Champions; (R) Relegated

== See also ==
- 1930 Peruvian Primera División
