= Telmo Carbajo =

Peruvian footballer and manager (1889–1948)

Personal information
- Full name: Telmo Carbajo Cavero
- Date of birth: 14 April 1889
- Place of birth: Callao, Peru
- Date of death: 12 July 1948 (aged 59)
- Place of death: Callao, Peru
- Position: Forward

Senior career*
Years	Team	Apps	(Gls)
1912	Miraflores SC		
1913	Jorge Chávez No. 1		
1914–1916	Jorge Chávez No. 2		
1926–1928	Atlético Chalaco		

Managerial career
- 1930: Atlético Chalaco
- 1935: Peru
- * Club domestic league appearances and goals

Telmo Carbajo Cavero (14 April 1889 – 12 July 1948) was a Peruvian footballer and manager.

Characterized by his versatility, he played as a striker, but also played as a midfielder, defender and goalkeeper, in addition to playing other sports such as basketball, cricket and baseball.

== Biography ==
Nicknamed Abuelito (Grandpa), Telmo Carbajo was the undisputed star of Jorge Chávez No. 1, which won the Peruvian championship in 1913. But it was with a club in Callao that he became truly associated with the sport: Atlético Chalaco. After retiring as a player from Chalaco in 1928, he led them to the 1930 Peruvian championship as their coach.

He also had the opportunity to coach the Peruvian national team during the 1935 South American Championship.

He died on July 12, 1948. As a tribute, the club Atlético Telmo Carbajo was named after him, as was the Telmo Carbajo Stadium in Callao, which was renamed in his honor in 1949.

== Honours ==
=== Player ===
Jorge Chávez No. 1

- Liga Peruana de Football: 1913

=== Manager ===
Atlético Chalaco

- Peruvian Primera División: 1930
