= 1936 Primera División Unificada de Lima y Callao =

Primera División Unificada
- Season: 1936
- Dates: 12 June 1936 – 20 September 1936
- Champions: Deportivo Municipal

The 1936 season of the Primera División Unificada, was a promotion championship that was played in a single season in 1936. It was the second category in tournaments in Peru in that year and granted two promotions to the 1937 Peruvian Primera División.

The tournament had 6 teams from Lima and 6 from Callao. From 1931 until 1942 the points system was W:3, D:2, L:1, walkover:0 and the results of a reserve teams league were added as bonus points.

== Teams ==
=== Team changes ===
Promoted from 1935 Primera B	Promoted from 1935 Liga Provincial del Callao	Promoted from 1935 División Intermedia (Lima)	Promoted from 1935 División Intermedia (Callao)
▲ Sport Progreso (2nd) ▲ Unión Carbone (3rd) ▲ Sportivo Melgar (4th) ▲ Ciclista Lima (5th)	▲ Unión Buenos Aires (3rd) ▲ Jorge Chávez (4th) ▲ Porteño (5th) ▲ Atlético Excelsior (6th)	▲ Atlético Córdoba (1st) ▲ Deportivo Municipal (2nd)	▲ Progresista Apurímac (1st) ▲ White Star (2nd)

=== Stadia and Locations ===
Team	City
Atlético Córdoba	Barrios Altos
Atlético Excelsior	Callao
Ciclista Lima	Cercado de Lima
Deportivo Municipal	Cercado de Lima
Jorge Chávez	Callao
Porteño	Callao
Progresista Apurímac	Callao
Sport Progreso	Rímac, Lima
Sportivo Melgar	Barrios Altos
Unión Carbone	Barrios Altos
Unión Buenos Aires	Callao
White Star	Callao

== League table ==
=== Primeros Equipos ===
Pos	Team	Pld	W	D	L	GF	GA	GD	Pts	Qualification or relegation
1	Deportivo Municipal	11	7	3	1	23	8	+15	28	Primeros Equipos play-off
2	Atlético Córdoba (O)	11	8	1	2	31	13	+18	28	Primeros Equipos play-off
3	Sportivo Melgar	11	5	6	0	23	9	+14	27	
4	Unión Buenos Aires	11	5	4	2	20	12	+8	25	
5	Sport Progreso	11	5	1	5	24	18	+6	22	
6	Atlético Excelsior	11	4	3	4	21	18	+3	22	
7	Ciclista Lima	11	5	1	5	20	19	+1	22	
8	Progresista Apurímac	11	4	3	4	17	24	−7	22	
9	White Star	11	3	4	4	17	14	+3	21	
10	Jorge Chávez	11	2	3	6	7	16	−9	18	
11	Unión Carbone	11	3	0	8	13	26	−13	17	
12	Porteño	11	0	1	10	9	48	−39	12	

(O) Play-off winners

==== Results ====
Home \ Away	COR	EXC	CIC	MUN	JCH	POR	APU	PRO	MEL	CAR	UBA	WHI
Atlético Córdoba		2–1	4–2	2–2	3–0	10–0		2–1				
Atlético Excelsior					3–0			1–2			2–2	0–3
Ciclista Lima		2–4			1–0	6–2		1–2	1–2			
Deportivo Municipal		3–1	1–0				7–0	2–0		2–1		0–0
Jorge Chávez				0–2		1–1		3–2	0–0	1–0		
Porteño		2–4		0–2					0–2		0–3	1–7
Progresista Apurímac	0–3	2–2	1–2		1–1	2–1				3–1		1–1
Sport Progreso						8–0	1–4		1–1	2–3	2–1	
Sportivo Melgar	3–0	0–0		2–2			4–1			6–1		1–1
Unión Carbone	1–2	0–3	1–2			3–2					1–0	1–3
Unión Buenos Aires	3–1		1–1	2–0	2–1		1–1		2–2			
White Star	0–2		1–2		0–0			0–3			1–3	

Updated to match(es) played on unknown. Source: Diario El Comercio, La Prensa and Crónica.
Legend: Blue = home team win; Yellow = draw; Red = away team win.

==== Primeros Equipos play-off ====
Team 1	Score	Team 2
Deportivo Municipal	1–2	Atlético Córdoba

=== Tabla Absoluta ===
Pos	Team	Pld	W	D	L	GF	GA	GD	Pts	Resv.	Total	Qualification or relegation
1	Deportivo Municipal (C)	11	7	3	1	23	8	+15	28	7.5	35.5	1937 Primera División
2	Sportivo Melgar	11	5	6	0	23	9	+14	27	6.5	33.5	1937 Primera División
3	Atlético Córdoba	11	8	1	2	31	13	+18	28	5.25	33.25	1937 Liga Provincial de Lima
4	Unión Buenos Aires	11	5	4	2	20	12	+8	25	5.5	30.5	1937 Liga Provincial del Callao
5	Ciclista Lima	11	5	1	5	20	19	+1	22	6.25	28.5	1937 Liga Provincial de Lima
6	Sport Progreso	11	5	1	5	24	18	+6	22	5.5	27.5	1937 Liga Provincial de Lima
7	Progresista Apurímac	11	4	3	4	17	24	−7	22	5.5	27.5	1937 Liga Provincial del Callao
8	White Star	11	3	4	4	17	14	+3	21	5.25	26.25	1937 Liga Provincial del Callao
9	Atlético Excelsior	11	4	3	4	21	18	+3	22	3.75	25.75	1937 Liga Provincial del Callao
10	Jorge Chávez	11	2	3	6	7	16	−9	18	5.5	23.5	1937 Liga Provincial del Callao
11	Unión Carbone	11	3	0	8	13	26	−13	17	5	22	1937 Liga Provincial de Lima
12	Porteño	11	0	1	10	9	48	−39	12	4.5	16.5	1937 Liga Provincial del Callao

== See also ==
- 1936 Torneo Peruano Extraoficial
