= Alianza Frigorífico =

Peruvian football club

Centro Deportivo Alianza Frigorífico Nacional
- Full name: Alianza Frigorífico
- Founded: 1929
- Dissolved: 1935; 91 years ago
Home colours

Alianza Frigorífico was a Peruvian association football club, located in the city of Callao.

== History ==
In 1929, a group of employees from the Frigorífico Nacional founded the club Centro Sportivo Frigorífico Nacional, with Billy Fry Valle Riestra serving as its first president. At the beginning of the following year, the club merged with Atlético Alianza Callao, which was competing in the División Intermedia, resulting in the formation of Centro Deportivo Alianza Frigorífico Nacional.

In the 1930 season, Alianza Frigorífico Nacional won the División Intermedia title in an unbeaten campaign, earning promotion to the Peruvian Primera División. The following year, in 1931, the club finished in third place in the league and also won the Reserve tournament, accumulating 27 points, compared to 23 points obtained by Alianza Lima.

In 1932, the club, along with several other teams from Callao, withdrew from the league organized by the Peruvian Football Federation in order to participate in the newly established Liga Provincial del Callao. In its first season, it finished as runner-up, and in the subsequent tournament, it was crowned champion.

In the 1934 season, following a poor campaign, the club finished in last place and was relegated. The following year, it did not participate in the División Intermedia (Callao), leading to its eventual dissolution.

== Honours ==
=== Senior titles ===
Keys

- Record
- ^{(s)} Shared record

Type	Competition	Titles	Runner-up	Winning years	Runner-up years
Regional (League)	Primera División Amateur del Callao	1	1	1933	1932
Regional (League)	División Intermedia	1	—	1930	—

=== Youth team ===
Type	Competition	Titles	Runner-up	Winning years	Runner-up years
National (League)	Torneo Equipos de Reserva	—	1	—	1931

== See also ==
- List of football clubs in Peru
- Peruvian football league system
