= Sporting Tabaco =

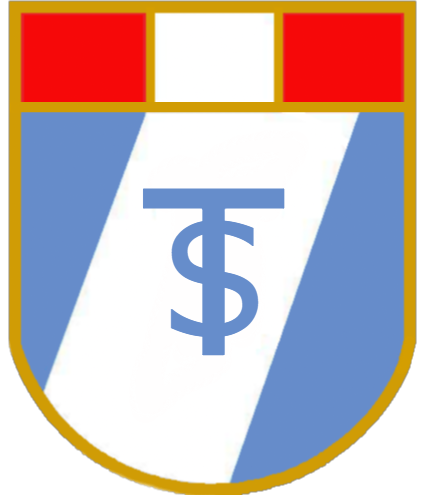
- Full name: Club Sporting Tabaco
- Nicknames: Rimenses; Celestes; Tabaqueros
- Founded: 16 November 1926; 99 years ago
- Dissolved: 1955
Home colours	Away colours

Club Sporting Tabaco was a Peruvian football club located in the district of Rímac, Lima. The club was founded on 16 November 1926.

== History ==
Sporting Tabaco was founded on November 16, 1926, made up mainly of workers and employees of the Estanco de Tabaco, a state entity that monopolized the tobacco trade in Peru. Founded in the Rímac neighborhood, its first president was Mr. Cristóbal Jiménez, general manager of the tobacconist. The club was registered in the Segunda División Provincial de Lima (third category) in which it participated in 1927.

From 1929 to 1955, Tabaco played in the Peruvian Primera División, only descending in category in the 1934 championship to the 1935 Primera B, returning to the Division of Honor for the 1937 tournament, it was one of the cheering teams, although it did not achieve any championship. In 1944 he finished in last place but maintained the category after defeating Ciclista Lima (1944 Segunda División champion) in the Promotion/Relegation playoff, popularly called "Rueda Trágica", since there was no direct relegation.

According to some journalistic sources, critics and fans considered Tabaco a "big" club in Peruvian football, although quite far from the classic teams such as Universitario, Alianza Lima, Deportivo Municipal and Sport Boys. In 1931, Sporting Tabaco achieved the national runner-up position behind Alianza Lima and repeated in 1954.

In 1955, Tabaco faced a difficult situation both in terms of sporting results and economic management. Since 1951, the football championship had stopped being amateur and became professional and that change destabilized the institution. Furthermore, the change in the country's economic situation (paradoxically) had weakened the strength of the Tobacco Store, which no longer had the same strength as before, as imported cigarettes had entered the country. As early as late 1954, it was rumored that the new administrators of the Backus and Johnston Brewing Company (which had just been acquired by Peruvian businessmen) had the idea of a professional football team representing the company. Because the brewery factory was also located in Rímac District, it began to be rumored that Backus was planning to acquire Sporting Tabaco.

=== Sporting Cristal ===
Ricardo Bentín Mujica, with the support of his wife, co-owners of Backus and Johnston brewery, was the man who is credited with achieving the company's goal. A club from Rímac ward, known as Sporting Tabaco founded in 1926 and originally belonging to the tobacco growers' union, was already playing in the professional Peruvian First Division. Never having won a national championship, the club was in dire economic straits. Bentín decided to buy the club and search for a playing ground, so that the club could develop and be able to play better at the professional level. The club found a lot in the neighborhood of La Florida of 137,000 m^{2}.

On December 13, 1955, the club was founded as Sporting Cristal , after Backus' best-known beer brand, Cristal. The new club from the Rímac ward debuted in 1956 in the professional Primera Division and won their first national title that same year. Journalists thus called them the club born a champion (nació campeon). The team managed to win more titles over the years and was known as one of the best football clubs in Peru after Universitario and Alianza Lima.

== Honours ==
=== Senior titles ===
Keys

- Record
- ^{(s)} Shared record

Type	Competition	Titles	Runner-up	Winning years	Runner-up years
National (League)	Primera División	—	2	—	1931, 1954
Half-year / Short tournament (League)	Torneo de Primeros Equipos	—	1	—	1931
Half-year / Short tournament (League)	Campeonato de Apertura (ANA)	1	2	1954	1949, 1954
Regional (League)	Primera B	1	—	1935	—
Regional (League)	División Intermedia	1	—	1928	—
Regional (League)	Segunda División Amateur de Lima	—	1	—	1927 A.D. Barrios Altos

== Statistics and results in First Division ==
=== League history ===
Season	Div.	Pos.	Pl.	W	D	L	GF	GA	P	Notes
1929	1st	6	11	3	5	3	23	16	11	6/12 Regular season
1930	1st	3	3	2	0	1	6	4	4	2/4 Group 3 / Group Stage
1931	1st	2	11	8	1	2	35	19	34	2/12 Absolute table
1932	1st	3	7	4	1	2	20	9	19.75	3/8 Absolute table
1933	1st	7	9	2	3	4	18	20	20.50	7/10 Absolute table
1934	1st	6	8	3	2	3	13	14	20.25	6/9 Absolute table
1937	1st	7	9	3	2	4	10	11	19.50	7/10 Absolute table
1938	1st	4	8	2	4	2	16	12	16	4/9 Regular season
1939	1st	4	14	5	4	5	27	26	28	4/8 Regular season
1940	1st	6	14	5	3	6	25	23	27	6/8 Regular season
1941	1st	4	14	6	2	6	17	18	28	4/8 Regular season
1942	1st	7	9	4	0	5	17	19	17	7/10 Regular season
1943	1st	4	14	7	2	5	26	24	16	4/8 Regular season
1944	1st	8	14	2	4	8	18	41	8	8/8 Regular season
1945	1st	6	14	4	3	7	28	46	11	6/8 Regular season
1946	1st	7	21	7	3	11	55	71	17	7/8 Regular season
1947	1st	7	21	7	3	11	45	51	17	7/8 Regular season
1948	1st	3	24	11	7	6	47	34	29	3/9 Regular season
1949	1st	3	21	6	10	5	36	29	22	3/8 Regular season
1950	1st	3	18	8	5	5	45	37	21	3/10 Regular season
1951	1st	8	18	4	6	8	33	43	14	8/10 Regular season
1952	1st	3	18	9	4	5	38	34	22	3/10 Regular season
1953	1st	3	18	7	6	5	40	34	20	3/10 Regular season
1954	1st	2	18	11	2	5	41	32	24	2/10 Regular season
1955	1st	9	18	2	3	13	34	44	11	9/10 Regular season

== See also ==
- Peruvian football league system
