= Sport Progreso =

Peruvian football club

- Full name: Sport Progreso
- Nickname: Progresistas
- Founded: June 13, 1912; 113 years ago
- Dissolved: 1990; 36 years ago
- Ground: Estadio Nacional; Lima, Peru
- Capacity: 45,000
Home colours

Sport Progreso was a Peruvian football club, located in the city of Lima. The club was founded with the name of club Sport Progreso and played in Peruvian Primera División from 1912 until 1933. The club won the national tournament in 1921 and 1926. In 1933, Sport Progreso was relegated and it was their last appearance in the Peruvian Primera División.

== History ==
Club Sport Progreso was a football club based in the district of Rímac, Lima. It was founded on June 13, 1912, by workers of the textile factory El Progreso.

The team became the first-ever champion of the tournaments organized by the Peruvian Football Federation in 1926. Earlier, in 1921, Sport Progreso had also been crowned the final champion of the Peruvian Football League Championship and winner of the Dewar Shield, a trophy awarded during the early days of local football, prior to the creation of the FPF.

Born out of the Santa Catalina factory in Rímac—one of the most important textile mills in Lima at the beginning of the 20th century—Sport Progreso's greatest achievements were the league titles in 1921 and 1926, both secured in the amateur era of Peruvian football.

The club was a regular participant in the División de Honor until 1930, when it suffered its first relegation. However, it earned promotion back in 1932 and managed to remain in the top flight for another season. It was later relegated to the Liga de Lima—at the time the de facto second tier, as the official Second Division only began in 1936—and continued dropping through the divisions. In 1958, the club failed to show up for Third Division competition and ultimately folded.

In 1983, Sport Progreso was revived for the first time in the Liga Distrital de Magdalena del Mar, adopting the name Club Deportivo Sport Progreso. Through the Liga Distrital de Magdalena, the team climbed the ladder and eventually reached the Liga Mayor de Fútbol de Lima, where it was relegated again in 1990. The club was set to return to the Liga Distrital de Magdalena but did not register to compete and disappeared once more.

== Honors ==
=== Senior titles ===
Keys

- Record
- ^{(s)} Shared record

Type	Competition	Titles	Runner-up	Winning years	Runner-up years
National (League)	Primera División	2	1	1921, 1926	1920
Regional (League)	Primera División Amateur de Lima	—	1	—	1937
Regional (League)	División Intermedia	1	1	1934	1931
Regional (League)	Liga Distrital de Magdalena del Mar	1	—	1983	—

== Statistics and results in First Division ==
=== League history ===
Season	Div.	Pos.	Pl.	W	D	L	GF	GA	P	Notes
1926	1st	1	6	4	2	0	17	6	10	1/11 Regular season
1927	1st	6	3	1	0	2	3	6	2	6/8 Regular season
1928	1st	4	13	8	2	3	22	18	18	1/10 Primera Fase - Grupo 2, 4/5 Liguilla Final
1929	1st	7	11	4	3	4	19	23	11	7/12 Regular season
1930	1st	12	5	0	2	3	5	15	2	4/4 Primera Fase - Grupo 2, 3/3 Liguilla Descenso
1932	1st	6	7	2	2	3	9	17	15.25	6/8 Regular season
1933	1st	9	9	3	1	5	13	21	19.5	9/10 Regular season

== Notable players ==
- (Peru) Lizardo Rodríguez Nue (1928–1930)
- (Peru) Juan Bulnes (1921–1927, 1935)

== See also ==
- List of football clubs in Peru
- Peruvian football league system
