= Peruvian División Intermedia (1926–1940) =

División Intermedia
- Founded: 1926
- Folded: 1940
- Country: Peru
- Confederation: CONMEBOL
- Level on pyramid: 2 (1926–1928); 3 (1929); 2 (1930–1934); 3 (1935–1940)
- Promotion to: Primera División
- Relegation to: Segunda División Provincial (Lima)

The División Intermedia, the second division of Peruvian football (soccer) in 1926 until 1934, and the third division of Peruvian football (soccer) in 1935 until 1940. The tournament was played on a home-and-away round-robin basis.

On August 23, 1922, the Peruvian Football Federation (FPF) was founded and since 1926 tournaments began to be played under its organization. As the second category in the tournament system, the División Intermedia was found, which granted promotions to the champion ( and sometimes to the runner-up) to the Peruvian Primera División. Only the 1928 and 1931 editions did not give direct promotion but rather the classification to a promotion league.

In 1935 the División Intermedia became the third level of the tournament system below the Primera División A and the newly formed Primera División B. The first places obtained promotion to the 1936 Primera División Unificada de Lima y Callao and in the following years to the Liga Provincial de Lima.

It remained in dispute until 1940 and the following year it disappeared when the tournament system was reorganized with the creation of the Liga Regional de Lima y Callao.

== Champions ==
=== División Intermedia (Lima) ===
Ed.	Season	Champion	Runner-up
1	1926	Association Alianza	Unión Santa Catalina
2	1927	No champion crowned.^{[A]}	
3	1928	Sporting Tabaco	Unión Estrella
As Third Division tournament
4	1929	Sportivo Uruguay	Intelectual Raymondi
As Second Division tournament
5	1930	Alianza Frigorífico	Alianza Cóndor
6	1931	Sucre	Sport Progreso
7	1932	Sucre	Sport Boys
8	1933	Unión Carbone	Sportivo Melgar
9	1934	Sport Progreso	Sportivo Melgar
As Third Division tournament
10	1935	Atlético Cordoba	Deportivo Municipal
11	1936	Alianza Cóndor	Atlético Peruano
12	1937	Atlético Lusitania	Juventud Gloria
13	1938	Juventud Perú	Sportivo Uruguay
14	1939	Porvenir Miraflores	Alianza Libertad
15	1940	Miguel Grau	Alianza Pino
Defunct Tournament

==== Footnotes ====
A. At the end of the season, the 10 best-placed teams were directly promoted to 1928 Primera División. These teams were Sportivo Unión, Alianza Chorrillos, Santa Catalina, Lawn Tennis, Alberto Secada, Jorge Washington, Alianza Callao, José Olaya, Jorge Chávez (C) and Unión FBC.

== Titles by club ==
Rank	Club	Winners	Winning years
1	Alianza Cóndor	2	1926, 1936
1	Sucre	2	1931, 1932
2	Alianza Frigorífico	1	1930
2	Atlético Córdoba	1	1935
2	Atlético Lusitania	1	1937
2	Juventud Perú	1	1938
2	Miguel Grau	1	1940
2	Porvenir Miraflores	1	1939
2	Sport Progreso	1	1934
2	Sporting Tabaco	1	1928
2	Sportivo Uruguay	1	1929
2	Unión Carbone	1	1933
