= Unión Buenos Aires =

Peruvian football club

- Full name: Unión Buenos Aires
- Founded: 9 March 1917
- Dissolved: 1990
- Ground: Estadio Nacional; Lima, Peru
- Capacity: 45,000
Home colours	Away colours

Unión Buenos Aires was a Peruvian football club, located in the city of Callao.

== History ==
Unión Buenos Aires was founded on March 9, 1917, in the Ferrocarril Inglés neighborhood, in the early blocks of Buenos Aires avenue. Its first president was Ramón Sánchez, while Francisco Derpich served as the club’s first captain.

Driven by club official Ulises Casanova, Unión Buenos Aires gradually gained prestige through its performances in the Fiestas Patrias tournaments in the port city, and later in matches played in Lima against local sides. In September 1923, the club faced Atlético Chalaco—then the leading team in Callao—for the first time at the Circolo Sportivo Italiano stadium, suffering a 2–0 defeat. They would later face the same opponent again, recording three consecutive victories.

On September 7, 1924, forming a combined side with Atlético Chalaco, the club secured a 1–0 victory over a Uruguayan selection that had arrived in the country under the representation of the Uruguayan Football Association to play a series of friendly matches. This result marked the only defeat suffered by the visiting side.

The winning goal was scored from the penalty spot by Alfonso “El Sereno” Saldarriaga—who was a Unión Buenos Aires player at the time. The lineup for that match featured Enrique Álvarez; Vicente Gorriti and Alfonso Saldarriaga; Faustino Mustafich, José “Patuto” Arana and Juan Leva; Humberto Martínez, Víctor Gonzales, Manuel Puente, Esteban Dañino, and Félix Muñoz.

The club was one of the participants in the 1926 Peruvian Primera División, the first edition held following the creation of the Peruvian Football Federation. In the 1927 season, it finished in second place behind Alianza Lima before the tournament was suspended.

The lineup for that campaign featured Armando Ríos; Narciso León and Domingo Donayre; Faustino Mustafich, José Arana, and Alberto Reyna; Pablo Pacheco, Jesús Gutiérrez, Daniel Breiding, Víctor Gonzales, and Germán Vargas.

In the 1928 Peruvian Primera División, the club missed out on the title playoff after losing 2–0 to Federación Universitaria in the final round. It continued competing in the Primera División until the end of the 1931 season.

The following year, the club withdrew from the league to join the newly established Liga Provincial del Callao, which brought together most of the Callao-based teams of the time, remaining there until 1935.

The club took part in the 1936 Primera División Unificada de Lima y Callao, which served as the second tier that season, aiming to secure one of the two promotion spots to the División de Honor. It finished in fourth place, behind Deportivo Municipal, Sportivo Melgar, and Atlético Córdoba, and subsequently returned to the Liga Provincial del Callao.

In the following years, the club competed in the Liga Provincial del Callao and later in the Liga Regional de Lima y Callao. It featured in the Primera División Amateur only during the 1946 Liga Regional de Lima y Callao, alternating in other seasons between the Second and Third Amateur divisions. After another separation of the Liga Provincial del Callao in 1951, the club continued competing across various levels of the local system until the mid-1990s, when it failed to appear in the Segunda División of the Liga Distrital del Callao.

== Honours ==
=== Senior titles ===
Keys

- Record
- ^{(s)} Shared record

Type	Competition	Titles	Runner-up	Winning years	Runner-up years
National (League)	Primera División	—	1	—	1927
Regional (League)	Liga Distrital del Callao	—	1	—	1980
Regional (League)	Segunda División Regional de Lima y Callao	—	1	—	1946 Serie A
Regional (League)	Tercera División Regional de Lima y Callao	—	1	—	1944

== See also ==
- List of football clubs in Peru
- Peruvian football league system
