= Estadio Nacional (1897) =

Former stadium in Lima, Peru

Estadio Nacional del Perú
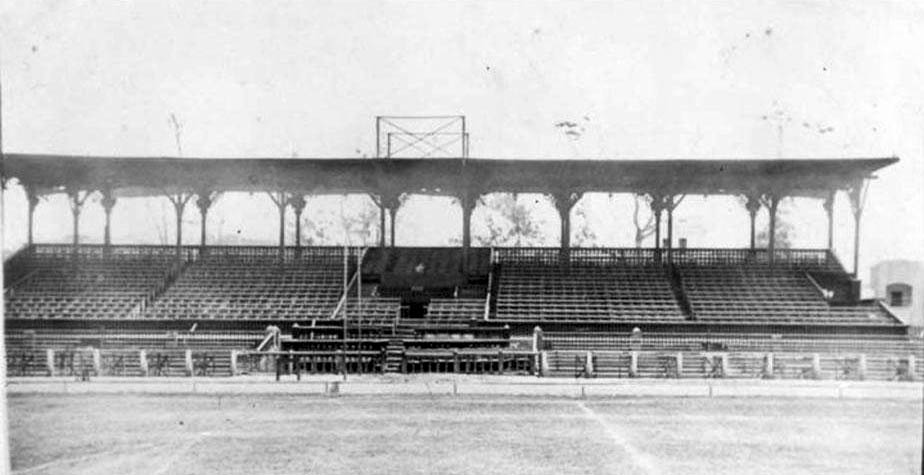
- View of stadium's grandstand, c. 1900
- Interactive map of Estadio Nacional del Perú
- Full name: Estadio Guadalupe; Estadio Nacional del Perú (National Stadium of Peru)
- Location: Lima, Peru
- Coordinates: 12.06714°S 77.03372°W
- Capacity: 40,000

Construction
- Opened: 1897
- Closed: 1951; 75 years ago

Tenants
- Peru national football team South American Championship 1927; South American Championship 1935; South American Championship 1939; 1947-48 Bolivarian Games

The original Estadio Nacional del Perú, originally known as Estadio Guadalupe, was a stadium that existed from July 18, 1897 until 1951 when it began, on the same land, the construction of Peru's current National Stadium. From 1921 this place was called Sports National Stadium since it was established as the main sports arena for the practice of football in Peru.

== History ==
In the late 19th century, When football practice began in the Peruvian city of Lima, there were only two grounds on which they could play soccer. One of them located in Lima Owned by Lima Cricket and Football Club another in El Callao located on the south coast of the province, an area known as Mar brava.

In 1896 the now-defunct club Cricket Union asked the Lima City Council the transfer of land suitable for sports, being so awarded the March 28 of that year, the land that belonged to the deceased Lima Gun Club and located in the vicinity of Exposition Park in the area known as Santa Beatriz and now belongs to Lima District.

The official opening of the sports stadium suitable for football practice gave July 18 of 1897 under the name Guadalupe Stadium. Thus, this area became the first major football stadium in the country, hosting the first Peruvian football championship. It is not known exactly when the field became property of the Peruvian Government.

For 1921, Lima underwent a process of embellishment mainly driven by president Augusto B. Leguia to celebrate the centenary of the Independence of Peru. Among these buildings, there were presents major foreign colonies residing in Peru. The colony English presented as well, the construction and expansion of the stadium on the same ground once occupied by the Guadalupe Stage to the new premises and was christened Lima's National Stadium.

The initial approach involved the construction of a large sports complex and therefore its construction took several years. El Nacional had a wooden platform and some preferential side boxes at floor level, which made it a simple style stadium. It also had an auxiliary field without stands. In addition, the sports complex had an Olympic swimming pool donated by the Japanese community in 1935.

The November 1 of 1927, Under the South American Championship 1927 This exhibition was the first game played by a Peruvian football selection, Facing the combined Uruguayan that came to be Olympic champion in the sport. Uruguay won that day by 4 to 0, but marked the beginning of the National Stadium as the only seat of the Peruvian team. Twelve days after that meeting, the November 13 of 1927 Stadium witnessed the first goal scored by a Peruvian team in the match against the Bolivia national football team.

The National Stadium was counting on building extensions and other platforms, all of wood. By that time was the main playground of the most popular teams in the country, Alianza Lima and Universitario de DeportesAt a time when football was consolidated as the most popular sport in the country.

In 1951, during the administration of President Manuel A. Odría, Lima's National Stadium was closed and demolished to make way for the construction of the current National Stadium. their wooden stands were intended for other sports venues, mainly inside the country and also to Estadio Teodoro Lolo Fernandez Club Universitario de Deportes. This stadium was in memory of football fans by the nickname of Old National Stadium.
