= Atlético Chalaco =

- Full name: Club Atlético Chalaco
- Nicknames: La Furia Chalaca; El León Porteño; El Decano del fútbol Porteño; La Garra Porteña; El Ballet Porteño; El Viejo León
- Founded: 9 June 1902; 124 years ago
- Ground: Estadio Telmo Carbajo, Callao
- Capacity: 8,000
- Chairman: (Peru) Pedro Morante Yarleque
- Manager: (Peru) Jorge La Rosa
- League: Copa Perú
- 2021: Eliminated in the Regional Phase
- Website: https://facebook.com/ClubAtleticoChalaco.Oficial/
Home colours	Away colours

Club Atlético Chalaco, commonly known as Atlético Chalaco, is a Peruvian football club based in Callao, Peru. The club was founded on 9 June 1902 by a group of students from the school, becoming the first football representative of Callao, which laid the foundations for future clubs. Atlético Chalaco currently plays in the Copa Perú, the fourth tier of the Peruvian football league system. They play their home games at Estadio Telmo Carbajo, which has a capacity of 5,000.

Atlético Chalaco has won several championships won at the district, regional and national level. In 1918, the club obtained recognition as a national champion when he beat the team of the nascent Peruvian Football League, which he defeated by 2 to 1. They have been champion of the Peruvian Primera División on two occasions: 1930 and 1947 and also has been runners-up four times in 1948, 1957, 1958 and 1979.

The clubs classic and historic rival is Sport Boys, with whom they play the Clásico Porteño, as both clubs are from Callao. It also had rivalries with the Lima clubs, with which the Lima-Callao classics were born. However these rivalries are no longer played as these clubs are in separate divisions.

The club also participates in junior and youth football tournaments.

== History ==
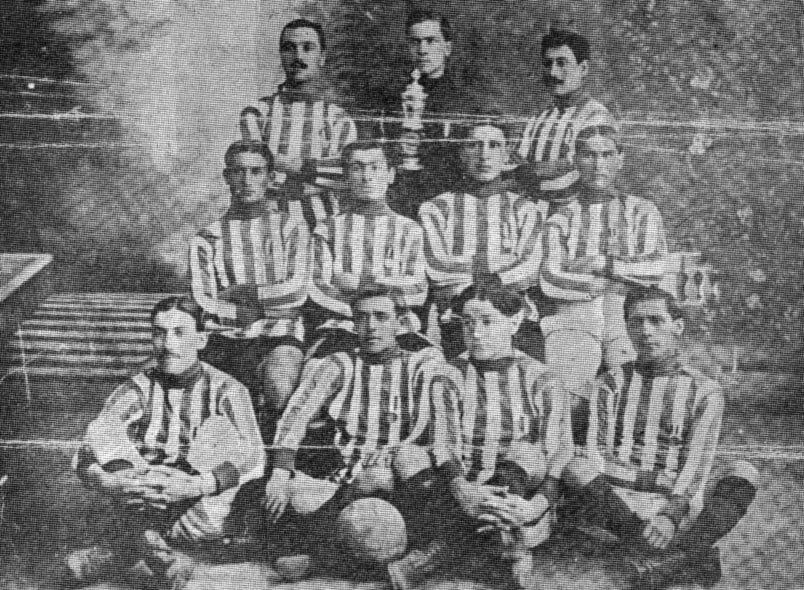
The team of 1913

The club was founded on 9th of June 1902 by the students of the Instituto Chalaco in the Marco Polo Nº 19 street, house of the captain Mr. Federico Rincón, father of one of the student founders. Its first President was Cesar Rivera, who at the same time was the captain of the team and he was also appointed Honorary President by August Cazorla, director of the institute. The club gained the affection of the people of Callao in no time leaving indelible testimonies through many generations who won major events that helped the contact and development of the town. He is known popularly as the León Porteño and the "Decano del Futbol Porteño".

Its debut was a 24 September of the year 1902, facing to the Sport Victoria, winning Chalaco for 1–0. Little by little went emphasizing among the clubs of the Callao of that epoch beginning to compete against the Lima clubs in some encounters that even they finished in pitched battle. The first National Olympic was carried out by the year 1917, and in the Championship was imposed as unbeaten, obtaining as prize a great shield that was exhibited in its old localities of the (Today Av. Sáenz Peña) counting in its rows with some of the most representative players of the epoch as Telmo Carbajo and Claudio Martínez.

On 7 September 1924, forming a combined with the club Unión Buenos Aires, rout to the Uruguayan selection for 1 to 0, in a historic match set against the Uruguayans. They emphasized in said match the players: Enrique Álvarez, Alfonso "El sereno" Saldarriaga, Antonio Maquilón, Faustino Mustafich, José "Patuto" Arana, Enrique Salas, Félix Muñoz, Esteban Dagnino, Manolo Puente and Juan Sudman.

In 1928 it becomes the first Peruvian football team that travelled to Quillota, Chile, before the teams of San Luis, Santiago Wanderers, Colo-Colo and others, in order to curing injuries on the War of the Pacific between both countries and of 8 matches that maintains with the main teams, alone loses one in his début front upon Colo-Colo.

In 1930, the club crowned Primera División champion after beating Alianza Lima 2–1 in the last round, with the following line-up: Enrique Álvarez; P. Ureta, Martínez, Enrique Salas, Juan Rivero, Faustino Mustafich, José Arana, Miñán, Miguel Rostaing, Manolo Puente, Miguel Arana.

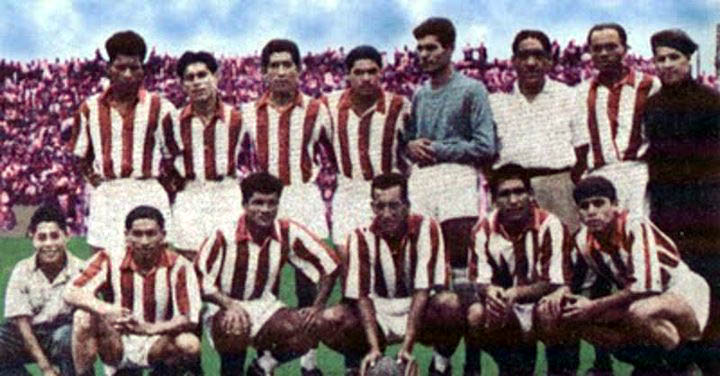
The 1947 Primera División champion

In 1947, after a great campaign and under the presidency of Mario Chiabra, the Atlético Chalaco, be consecrated again National Champion, they participated in said championship under the direction of the coach "Patuto" Arana the following players: Humberto Becerra, Eliseo Moral, Rene Rosasco, Juan Lecca, Félix Mina, "Perejil" Reynaldo Luna, Ernesto "Chicha" Morales, Guillermo Aguilar, Luis Rodriguez, Domingo Raffo (captain), Carlos Torres, Juan "Cartucho" Castillo. Also they participated Juan Alcazar, Francisco Viacava, Julio Navarrete, Armando Agurto, Bejar and Leon.

In 1948 they were national Sub-Champions, in that year they travelled to Guayaquil, Ecuador after a brilliant campaign they returned unbeaten.

In the 1950s the team earned the nickname 'Ballet Porteño' by its good play emphasizing the Paraguayan goalkeeper Adolfo Riquelme, Andrés Bedoya, Sabino Bártoli, Luis Portanova, Jacinto Villalba, Germán Colunga, Rene Rosasco, Felix Mina, Santiago Armandola, Gualberto Bianco, Antonio Aguiar and Luis López. In that decade the club achieved the subchampionships of the 1957 and 1958. The first one lost it before the Centro Iqueño and in the following one defined in a Clasico Porteño in last date before its rival neighbor the Sport Boys, to which surpassed in the board by a point, but could not celebrate that classic therefore fell defeated by 1 to 0 and consequently lost the National Title.

In 1962 it entered a phase of economic difficulties that carried it to lose the category descending to play in the Second Division where was maintained until 1965, when descends to the First Amateur in the League of the Callao.

After an intense fight by recovering its seat of honor, in 1971 was champion in the League of the Callao and upon winning the home run of the Interligas to the teams of Lima elevates to the Second Division. In 1972, including Alberto "Toto" Terry as the coach, champion in the Second Division after winning for 2 – 1 to the Porvenir Miraflores achieving the ascent to the First Division. The Callao entire dressed of festival with the triumph of the Chalaco and its return to the top division of Peruvian football.

In 1979, with the technical direction of Cesar Cubilla, the club of Callao was runner-up and is classified to represent to Peru in the Copa Libertadores 1980 next to the team of the Sporting Cristal facing to the teams champions from Argentina the River Plate and the Vélez Sársfield. Of that staff they emphasized Fernando Apolinario, Augusto Prado, Oscar Arizaga, Victor Benavides, Javier Chirinos and Alberto Castillo. The year 1985 remains last in the Metropolitan tournament and descends. Since then, carried out irregular campaigns in the League of the Callao.

In 1987 it could return to the first division although the team lost via penalty shoot-out to Guardia Republicana. In recent years the León Porteño assembled good teams and advanced in the Peru Cup, but failed to surpass the Regional phase of the versions 2000, 2002, 2005 and 2007.

On October 15, 2003, the Third Penal Court of the Callao Judiciary ruled to return control of the club to its supporters, ending a 20-year legal dispute. The resolution followed successive efforts by ten separate recovery committees.

In the 2008 it is elected president Alex Kouri, doing an important investment to achieve the title of the Peru Cup and the ascent to First Division, nevertheless again only he would arrive to the Regional Phase where would be eliminated by the Union Supe that defeated it in both matches. 18 February 2009 Kouri renounced the presidency, taking on the job in a temporary way Abelardo D´Angelo Cobos.

== Stadium ==
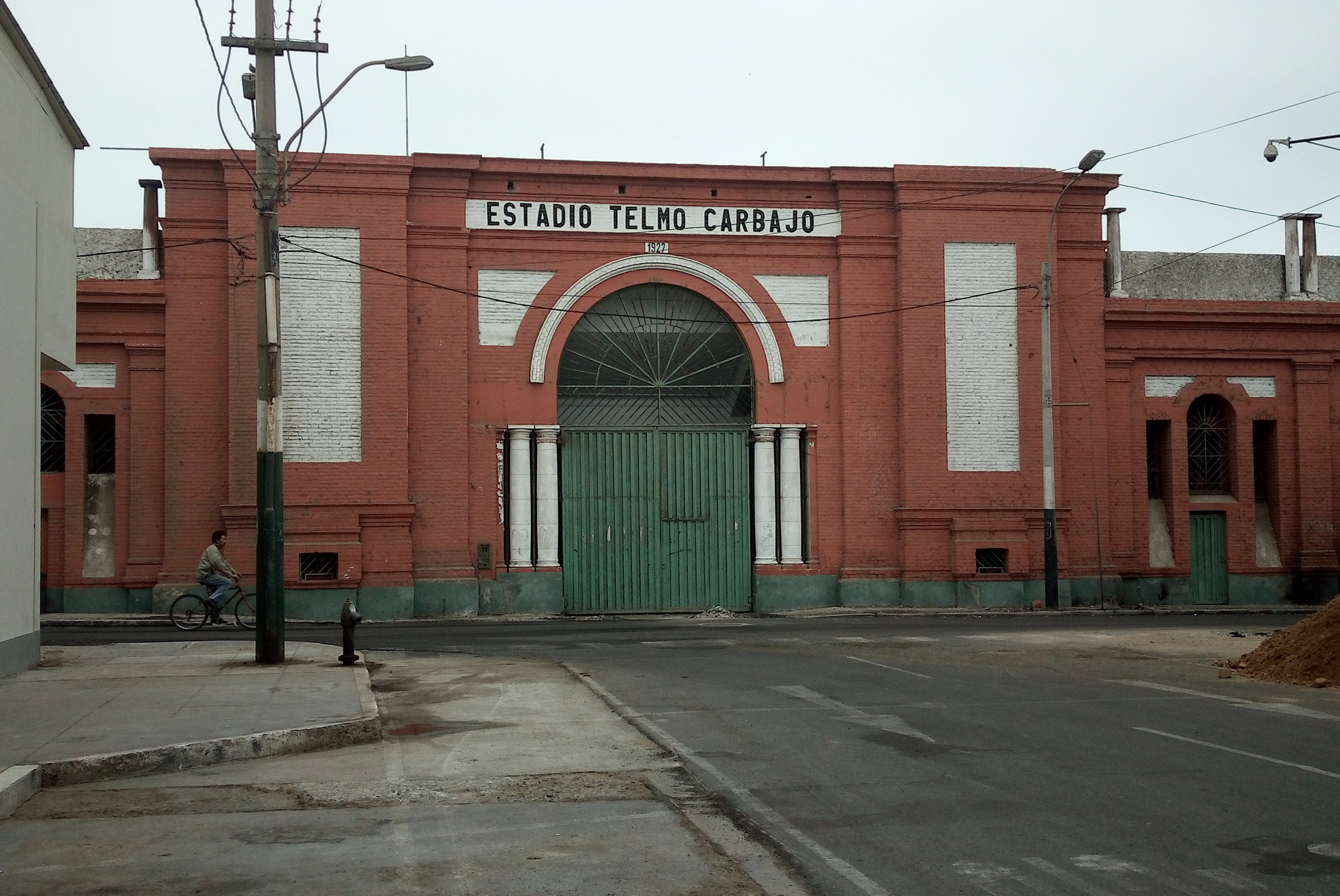
Estadio Telmo Carbajo

Atlético Chalaco's home stadium is Estadio Telmo Carbajo located in Callao. The stadium has a capacity of 5,000. The club played for long periods at the stadium until its discontinuation due to the inauguration of the Estadio Miguel Grau. The stadium later named in honor of the greatest idol of Atlético Chalaco, Telmo Carbajo, was always the stronghold of the chalaca fury that every day could be heard rumbling with a loud voice "chalaco fury, chalaco fury". The stadium was abandoned until 2018 when it was renovated for the 2019 Pan American Games, however it was ultimately reconstituted as a training facility due to the stands' poor state and official matches are played at Grau.

== Honours ==
=== Senior titles ===
Keys

- Record
- ^{(s)} Shared record

Type	Competition	Titles	Runner-up	Winning years	Runner-up years
National (League)	Primera División	2	4	1930, 1947	1948, 1957, 1958, 1979
National (League)	Segunda División	1	1	1972	1971
Half-year / Short; Tournament (League)	Campeonato de Apertura (ANA)	2	1	1948, 1953	1958
Regional (League)	Región IV	—	1	—	2002
Regional (League)	Liga Departamental de Callao	4	2	2000, 2002, 2005, 2008	2001, 2006
Regional (League)	Cuadrangular de Ascenso a Segunda División	1	—	1970	—
Regional (League)	Primera División Amateur del Callao	5	—	1932, 1934, 1935, 1966, 1970	—
Regional (League)	Liga Distrital del Callao	11	3	1992, 1996, 1997, 2000, 2001, 2004, 2005, 2007, 2008, 2012, 2022	2002, 2009, 2013

=== Youth team ===
Type	Competition	Titles	Runner-up	Winning years	Runner-up years
National (League)	Torneo Equipos de Reserva	—	1	—	1950

== Performance in CONMEBOL competitions ==
- Copa Libertadores: 1 appearance

1980: First Round

== Managers ==
- (Peru) Demetrio Medina (1987–1988)
- (Peru) Attilio Escate (1988–1989)
- (Peru) Rafael Farfán (1989)
- (Peru) Gabriel Sánchez (1990)
- (Peru) Lorenzo Company (1993)
- (Peru) Alfredo Humberto Morales Isla (1995–1997)
- (Peru) Mario Vega (2004)
- (Peru) Moisés Barack (2005)
- (Peru) Attilio Escate (2006)
- (Peru) Sigifredo Montes de Oca (2007)
- (Argentina) Horacio Baldessari (2008)
- (Peru) Manuel Campos (2009)
- (Peru) Attilio Escate (2009)
- (Peru) Cristóbal Suárez (2010)
- (Peru) César Roca (2011–2012)
- (Peru) Juan Carlos Rodríguez (2013)
- (Peru) César Roca (2014–2016)
- (Peru) Carlos Tori (2019)
- (Peru) Juan Carlos Tupac Yupanqui Niño de Guzmán (2020)
- (Peru) Omar Zegarra (2021)
- (Peru) José Ramírez Zacarías (2022)
- (Peru) Carlos Tori (2022)
- (Peru) Jorge La Rosa (2023-)

== See also ==
- List of football clubs in Peru
- Peruvian football league system
