= Circolo Sportivo Italiano =

Peruvian sports club

Italiano Lima
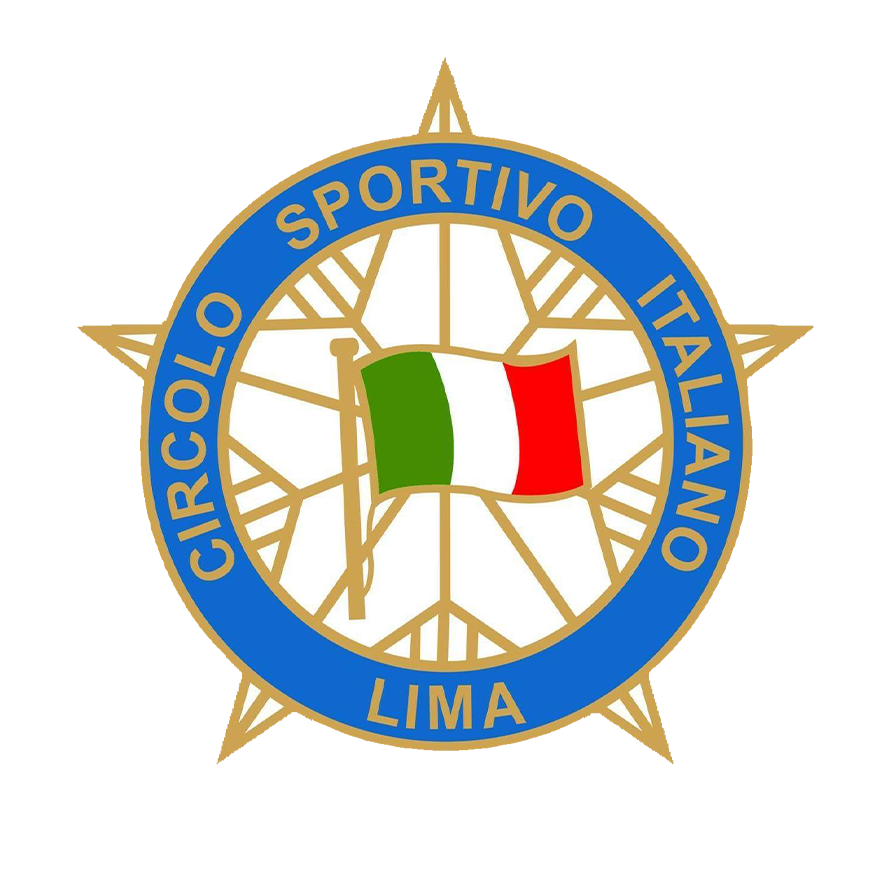
- Full name: Circolo Sportivo Italiano-Canottieri
- Nicknames: Canottieri, Los Azurros
- Founded: 1917
- Ground: Coliseo Deportivo, Lima
- Chairman: Tomás Sangio
- League: Copa Perú
Home colours	Away colours

The Circolo Sportivo Italiano is a Peruvian sports club located in the Lima metropolitan area. It is best known for its football, volleyball and basketball teams, which participate in national competitions, such as the Copa Perú, the Liga Nacional Superior and the Liga de Basket, respectively. The club's other sports include paleta frontón, bocce, billiards, fencing, swimming, rowing and tennis.

== History ==
The club was founded by on August 16, 1917, by Antonio D'Onofrio (the son of Pedro D'Onofrio) and 65 founding members of the Italian colony in Lima with the aim of promoting sport among the diaspora in Peru and their descendants. It has traditionally competed in various disciplines. In football, the club's representative team competed in the First Division of Peru from 1926 until 1934, when it was dissolved. Later, the Circolo Sportivo Italiano merged with the Società Canottieri Italia, both of which were brought together in the Sociedad Peruana Italiana, and according to its current statutes, it is currently named the Circolo Sportivo Italiano-Società Canottieri Italia.

Originally located at number 1094 of Belén Street, the club's success led to the quick move to a site in the district of Pueblo Libre, behind the country house of then president Augusto B. Leguía (later turned into the Rosa de América, a girls-only school) in Brazil Avenue. The merger of both clubs meant that the club also owned the site of the former Società Canottieri Italia, located in Coronel Bolognesi Avenue at La Punta (Callao). In Pueblo Libre, a modern stadium was built, which was inaugurated by Leguía himself in 1922 but eventually irreparably damaged by the earthquake of 1940.

== Notable players ==
- Jorge Pardón García
- Nicola Porcella
- Tulio Quiñones
- Yoshimar Yotún

== Honours ==
Keys

- Record
- ^{(s)} Shared record

=== Football ===
Type	Competition	Titles	Runner-up	Winning years	Runner-up years
National (League)	Primera División	—	1	—	1929
Regional (League)	Liga Distrital de San Isidro	1	4	2024	2013, 2015, 2022, 2023

=== Women's Volleyball ===
Type	Competition	Titles	Runner-up	Winning years	Runner-up years
National (League)	Liga Nacional Superior de Voleibol	2	1	2003–04, 2008–09	2018–19

== See also ==
- List of football clubs in Peru
- Peruvian football league system
