= 1992 FBC Melgar season =

FBC Melgar
1992 season
- Stadium: Estadio Mariano Melgar
- Torneo Descentralizado: Torneo Descentralizado League: Third (3°); Liguilla Pre-Libertadores: Fifth (5°); Sixth National (6°)
Home colours	Away colours	Third colours

The 1992 FBC Melgar season were the Seventy-eighth (78.º) of the club from its foundation in 1915, Twenty-Three (23) participations in the top-flight of Peruvian Primera División (of 76 Editions) with denomination Torneo Descentralizado. In Previous Season the club qualified as 1th Place of the Aggregated Zona Sur 1991 Torneo Descentralizado.

Melgar were a of sixteen (16) clubs in the Twenty-Seventh edition (27.º) Torneo Descentralizado, the competition most important of the Peruvian football. The club played the Peruvian Primera División.

== Torneo Descentralizado ==
The Descentralizado was played in three stages: in the First Stage, the teams played in a Round-robin Format, with home and away matches (Torneo Descentralizado League) totaling Thirty (30) matches each, The First (1°) place Will be year's National Champion and qualifying for the 2001 Copa Libertadores; in the Second Stage the Teams 2nd (2°) to the 6th (6°) place from table First Stage and 1992 Torneo Zonal champion, they played the (Liguilla Pre-Libertadores), the First (1°) place Will be year's National Runner-up and qualifying for the 2001 Copa Libertadores and Second (2°) qualifying for the 1993 Copa CONMEBOL.

Meanwhile, the two team with the lowest acumulative points Total (15th and 16th place) will be relegated to the 1993 Second Division (if is a team from Lima or Callao) and/or to the 1993 Copa Perú (if is a team from other departments).

=== Torneo Descentralizado League ===
Pos	Team	Pld	W	D	L	GF	GA	GD	Pts
2	Sporting Cristal	30	15	10	5	47	29	+18	40
3	FBC Melgar	30	14	9	7	48	28	+20	37
4	Sport Boys	30	12	12	6	52	35	+17	36

== See also ==
- FBC Melgar
- 1992 Torneo Descentralizado
