= César Charún =

Peruvian footballer (born 1970)

Personal information
- Full name: César Augusto Charún Pastor
- Date of birth: 25 October 1970 (age 56)
- Place of birth: Lima, Peru
- Height: 1.77 m (5 ft 10 in)
- Position: Center back

Youth career
- 1978–1983: Universitario
- 1984–1986: Alianza Lima

Senior career*
Years	Team	Apps	(Gls)
1987–1988	Coronel Bolognesi		
1989	AELU		
1990–1991	San Agustín		
1992–1993	Universitario		
1994	Deportivo Municipal		
1995	Deportivo Sipesa		
1996	Deportivo Municipal		
1997	Universitario		
1997–1999	Paniliakos	36	(4)
1999–2000	Sporting Cristal		
2000	Municipal Limeño		
2001	Estudiantes Medicina		
2001–2002	Cienciano		
2003–2004	FBC Melgar	50	(3)
2006	Chalatenango		
2006	Unión Huaral	16	(3)
2007–2008	UT Cajamarca		
2009	Hijos de Acosvinchos	15	(0)
2010	Atlético Minero	14	(3)
2011	Atlético Torino		

International career
1993	Peru	12	(0)
- * Club domestic league appearances and goals

César Augusto Charún Pastor (born 25 October 1970) is a Peruvian former footballer who played as a center back.

== Club career ==
Charún played for a number of clubs in Peru, including Universitario and Cienciano. He also had a spell with Paniliakos in the Super League Greece during the 1997–98 and 1998–99 seasons.

== International career ==
Charún made twelve appearances for the senior Peru national football team, including playing in a qualifying match for the 1994 FIFA World Cup.

== Honours ==
=== Club ===
Universitario de Deportes:

- Peruvian First Division (2): 1992, 1993
