= 1993 Torneo Intermedio =

Tournament details
- Country: Peru
- Dates: 30 May–25 July 1993
- Teams: 16

Final positions
- Champions: Deportivo Municipal
- Runners-up: Deportivo Sipesa
- 1994 Copa CONMEBOL: Deportivo Municipal

Tournament statistics
- Matches played: 60
- Goals scored: 166 (2.77 per match)

The Torneo Intermedio was an official Peruvian football cup competition held during the 1993 Copa América.

Although Deportivo Municipal won the tournament, they declined to play in the 1994 Copa CONMEBOL and Liguilla Pre-Libertadores runner-up received this berth (Sporting Cristal).

The 16 clubs were divided into 4 groups and the top two teams advanced to the quarterfinals.

== Teams ==
Locations of the 1993 Primera División teams

Team	City
Alianza Atlético	Sullana
Alianza Lima	Lima
Carlos A. Mannucci	Trujillo
Cienciano	Cusco
Defensor Lima	Lima
Deportivo Municipal	Lima
Deportivo Sipesa	Chimbote
León de Huánuco	Huánuco
Melgar	Arequipa
San Agustín	Lima
Sport Boys	Callao
Sporting Cristal	Lima
Unión Huaral	Huaral
Unión Minas	Cerro de Pasco
Universitario	Lima
UTC	Cajamarca

== Group stage ==
=== Group 1 ===
Pos	Team	Pld	W	D	L	GF	GA	GD	Pts	Qualification or relegation	HUA	LEÓ	SBA	UMI
1	Unión Huaral	6	3	2	1	8	6	+2	8	Final stage		0–2	0–0	2–2
2	León de Huánuco	6	2	3	1	6	5	+1	7	Final stage	1–3		2–1	0–0
3	Sport Boys	6	2	2	2	10	5	+5	6		1–2	1–1		5–0
4	Unión Minas	6	0	3	3	2	10	−8	3		0–1	0–0	0–2	

==== Results ====
30 May 1993	Sport Boys	1–2	Unión Huaral	Estadio Heraclio Tapia, Huánuco
13:30	Néstor Mordini 40'		Juan Vidales 27'; Rafael Guadalupe 53'

30 May 1993	León de Huánuco	0–0	Unión Minas	Estadio Heraclio Tapia, Huánuco
15:30				Attendance: 2,000

2 June 1993	Unión Minas	0–1	Unión Huaral	Estadio Heraclio Tapia, Huánuco
13:30			Miguel Elguera

2 June 1993	León de Huánuco	2–1	Sport Boys	Estadio Heraclio Tapia, Huánuco
15:30	César Rosales 24'; Milko Fae 48'		Rolando Assereto 54'

5 June 1993	León de Huánuco	1–3	Unión Huaral	Estadio Telmo Carbajo, Callao
13:30	Carlos Dolorier		Elías Rivera 48'; Jorge Cordero 58' (pen.); Manuel Fajardo 68'	Referee: Víctor Marañón

5 June 1993	Sport Boys	5–0	Unión Minas	Estadio Telmo Carbajo, Callao
15:30	Carlos Valerio 40'; Rolando Asseretto 44' 65'; Alfonso Yáñez 57' (pen.); Martín Ochandarte 76'			Referee: Juan Mondoñedo

13 June 1993	Unión Minas	0–0	León de Huánuco	Estadio Julio Lores Colán, Huaral
13:30

13 June 1993	Unión Huaral	0–0	Sport Boys	Estadio Julio Lores Colán, Huaral
15:30

19 June 1993	Unión Huaral	2–2	Unión Minas	Estadio Telmo Carbajo, Callao
13:30	Héctor Takayama 26'; Alfonso Reyna 63'		Jose Ruiz 43' 66'	Referee: Eduardo Laca

19 June 1993	Sport Boys	1–1	León de Huánuco	Estadio Telmo Carbajo, Callao
15:30	Néstor Mordini 60'		Carlos Dolorier 76'	Attendance: 590; Referee: Víctor Pasquel

27 June 1993	Unión Minas	0–2	Sport Boys	Estadio Julio Lores Colán, Huaral
13:30			Jacinto Rodríguez 17' (pen.); Néstor Mordini 83'

27 June 1993	Unión Huaral	0–2	León de Huánuco	Estadio Julio Lores Colán, Huaral
15:30			Danilo Galindo 6'; Tito Arismendi 82'

=== Group 2 ===
Pos	Team	Pld	W	D	L	GF	GA	GD	Pts	Qualification or relegation	MUN	CIE	MEL	ALI
1	Deportivo Municipal	6	3	3	0	9	2	+7	9	Final stage		0–0	1–1	4–0
2	Cienciano	6	2	4	0	9	4	+5	8	Final stage	1–1		4–0	1–1
3	Melgar	6	2	2	2	9	11	−2	6		0–2	1–1		6–3
4	Alianza Lima	6	0	1	5	5	14	−9	1		0–1	1–2	0–1	

==== Results ====
30 May 1993	Deportivo Municipal	0–0	Cienciano	Estadio Mariano Melgar, Arequipa
13:30

30 May 1993	Melgar	6–3	Alianza Lima	Estadio Mariano Melgar, Arequipa
15:30	Jorge Tapia 7'; Jorge Reyes 27'; Ricardo Zegarra 45'; César Adriazola 49' (pen.); Ricardo Kergaravat 65' (pen.); Benjamín Rodríguez 81'		Manuel Marengo 3'; Juan Saavedra 46' 71'	Referee: Juan Carrasco

2 June 1993	Alianza Lima	1–2	Cienciano	Estadio Mariano Melgar, Arequipa
13:30	Cristhian Timorán 86'		John Salas 54'; René Pinto 62'	Referee: Edilberto Bejarano

2 June 1993	Melgar	0–2	Deportivo Municipal	Estadio Mariano Melgar, Arequipa
15:30			Roberto Céspedes 54'; Eugenio La Rosa 84'

6 June 1993	Deportivo Municipal	4–0	Alianza Lima	Estadio Mariano Melgar, Arequipa
13:30	Eugenio La Rosa 32'; Alfredo Saavedra 71'; Ernesto Aguirre 86'; Julio Anton 87'			Referee: Fredy Ramírez

6 June 1993	Melgar	1–1	Cienciano	Estadio Mariano Melgar, Arequipa
15:30	Jorge Tapia 17'		Luis Salas 77'	Referee: Justo Calderón

13 June 1993	Alianza Lima	0–1	Melgar	Estadio Garcilaso, Cusco
13:30			Jorge Tapia 17'	Referee: Pablo Nesco

13 June 1993	Cienciano	1–1	Deportivo Municipal	Estadio Garcilaso, Cusco
15:30	Gilberto Pinto 67'		Ernesto Aguirre 32'	Referee: Máximo Sánchez

16 June 1993	Deportivo Municipal	1–1	Melgar	Estadio Garcilaso, Cusco
13:30

16 June 1993	Cienciano	1–1	Alianza Lima	Estadio Garcilaso, Cusco
15:30	Percy Aguilar 21'		Carlos Gonzáles 42'	Referee: Félix Huanca

20 June 1993	Alianza Lima	0–1	Deportivo Municipal	Estadio Garcilaso, Cusco
13:30			Ernesto Aguirre 72'	Attendance: 2,365; Referee: Máximo Sanchez

20 June 1993	Cienciano	4–0	Melgar	Estadio Garcilaso, Cusco
15:30	Falcón 22' (o.g.); Francisco Huerta 28'; Luis Salas 83' 90'			Referee: Francisco Paucar

=== Group 3 ===
Pos	Team	Pld	W	D	L	GF	GA	GD	Pts	Qualification or relegation	AAS	CRI	DLI	UTC
1	Alianza Atlético	6	4	2	0	11	1	+10	10	Final stage		2–0	0–0	4–1
2	Sporting Cristal	6	3	2	1	20	9	+11	8	Final stage	0–0		1–1	10–1
3	Defensor Lima	6	2	2	2	10	5	+5	6		0–1	1–2		5–0
4	UTC	6	0	0	6	7	33	−26	0		0–4	4–7	1–3	

==== Results ====
30 May 1993	UTC	1–3	Defensor Lima	Estadio Campeones del 36, Sullana
12:30	Julio Buendía 57'		José Cajat 4'; Jordan Petrov 36' 55'	Referee: Jofré García Godos

30 May 1993	Alianza Atlético	2–0	Sporting Cristal	Estadio Campeones del 36, Sullana
14:30	José Zapata 25'; Sergio Ibarra 40'			Attendance: 1,500; Referee: Esteban Gallo

6 June 1993	Alianza Atlético	4–1	UTC	Estadio Campeones del 36, Sullana
13:00	Jorge Aranda 9'; Iván Navarro 24'; Canty Távara 33' 72'		Julio Buendía 80'	Attendance: 804

6 June 1993	Sporting Cristal	1–1	Defensor Lima	Estadio Nacional, Lima
13:30	Manuel Earl 51' (pen.)		Jordan Petrov 17'	Referee: César Córdova

13 June 1993	UTC	4–7	Sporting Cristal	Estadio Campeones del 36, Sullana
13:30	Julio Buendía; Javier Carmen		Germán Pinillos; Orlando Prado; Carlos Torres; Alberto Ramírez; Julinho

13 June 1993	Alianza Atlético	0–0	Defensor Lima	Estadio Campeones del 36, Sullana
15:30

20 June 1993	Defensor Lima	5–0	UTC	Estadio Elías Aguirre, Chiclayo
13:30	Jordan Petrov 15' 25'; Carlos Paris 53'; Ramón Perleche 68'; Sandro Cavero 83' (pen.)

20 June 1993	Sporting Cristal	0–0	Alianza Atlético	Estadio Elías Aguirre, Chiclayo
15:30

27 June 1993	Defensor Lima	1–2	Sporting Cristal	Estadio Elías Aguirre, Chiclayo
15:30	Carlos Paris 3'		Germán Pinillos 70'; Alberto Ramírez 81'	Referee: José Zamora

30 June 1993	UTC	0–4	Alianza Atlético	Estadio Elías Aguirre, Chiclayo
11:30			Jorge Castillo 12'; Canty Távara 46' 68' (pen.); José Zapata 73'	Referee: Fabián Gonzales

3 July 1993	Sporting Cristal	10–1	UTC	Estadio Elías Aguirre, Chiclayo
14:00	Julinho; Germán Pinillos; Manuel Earl; Pedro Garay; Orlando Prado; Raúl Hurtado		Valladolid

3 July 1993	Defensor Lima	0–1	Alianza Atlético	Estadio Elías Aguirre, Chiclayo
16:00			Segundo Gonzales 38'

=== Group 4 ===
Pos	Team	Pld	W	D	L	GF	GA	GD	Pts	Qualification or relegation	SIP	UNI	AGU	CAM
1	Deportivo Sipesa	6	3	3	0	8	3	+5	9	Final stage		1–1	1–1	1–1
2	Universitario	6	3	1	2	10	5	+5	7	Final stage	0–1		4–0	3–1
3	San Agustín	6	3	1	2	6	7	−1	7		0–2	1–0		3–0
4	Carlos A. Mannucci	6	0	1	5	3	12	−9	1		0–2	1–2	0–1	

==== Results ====
6 June 1993	Deportivo Sipesa	1–1	San Agustín	Estadio Manuel Gómez Arellano, Chimbote
13:30	Ader Cruz 70'		Marco Rodríguez 41'

6 June 1993	Universitario	3–1	Carlos A. Mannucci	Estadio Manuel Gómez Arellano, Chimbote
15:30	Frank Palomino 37'; Avelino Vega		Fabián Arias 68'

13 June 1993	Carlos A. Mannucci	0–1	San Agustín	Estadio Mansiche, Trujillo
13:30			Néstor Cáceres 65'	Referee: Luis Salinas

13 June 1993	Universitario	0–1	Deportivo Sipesa	Estadio Mansiche, Trujillo
15:30			Víctor Díaz 59'	Attendance: 2,008; Referee: Roberto Soto

19 June 1993	San Agustín	1–0	Universitario	Estadio Manuel Gómez Arellano, Chimbote
13:30	Néstor Cáceres 60'

19 June 1993	Deportivo Sipesa	1–1	Carlos A. Mannucci	Estadio Manuel Gómez Arellano, Chimbote
15:30	Oscar Ferreyra 48'		Juan Zapata 12'

26 June 1993	San Agustín	0–2	Deportivo Sipesa	Estadio Mansiche, Trujillo
13:30

26 June 1993	Carlos A. Mannucci	1–2	Universitario	Estadio Mansiche, Trujillo
15:30

30 June 1993	San Agustín	3–0	Carlos A. Mannucci	Estadio Manuel Gómez Arellano, Chimbote
13:30	Néstor Cáceres 10'; Alex Magallanes 53' 67'			Referee: Marcos Llempen

30 June 1993	Deportivo Sipesa	1–1	Universitario	Estadio Manuel Gómez Arellano, Chimbote
15:30	Ader Cruz 39'		Ricardo Besada 85'	Referee: Víctor Mayorga

4 July 1993	Universitario	4–0	San Agustín	Estadio Mansiche, Trujillo
13:30	Gustavo Tempone 7' 26' 28'; Jesús Torrealva

4 July 1993	Carlos A. Mannucci	0–2	Deportivo Sipesa	Estadio Mansiche, Trujillo
15:30			Ader Cruz 27'; César Rodríguez 32'

== Final stage ==
=== Bracket ===
Quarter-finals
1	León de Huánuco	1	3	4 (3)
8	Deportivo Municipal (p)	2	2	4 (4)
4	Alianza Atlético	2	1	3 (1)
5	Universitario (p)	1	2	3 (3)
2	Cienciano	3	0	3 (4)
7	Unión Huaral (p)	0	3	3 (5)
3	Sporting Cristal	2	2	4
6	Deportivo Sipesa	3	2	5

Semi-finals
Deportivo Municipal	0	1	1
Universitario	0	0	0
Unión Huaral	0	1	1
Deportivo Sipesa	2	1	3

Finals
Deportivo Municipal (p)	2 (4)
Deportivo Sipesa	2 (3)

=== Quarterfinals ===
Team 1	Agg.	Team 2	1st leg	2nd leg
León de Huánuco	4–4 (3–4p)	Deportivo Municipal	1–2	3–2
Alianza Atlético	3–3 (1–3p)	Universitario	2–1	1–2
Cienciano	3–3 (4–5p)	Unión Huaral	3–0	0–3
Deportivo Sipesa	5–4	Sporting Cristal	3–2	2–2

==== First leg ====
5 July 1993	León de Huánuco	1–2	Deportivo Municipal	Estadio Heraclio Tapia, Huánuco
15:30	Carlos Cáceda 90+2' (o.g.)		Eugenio La Rosa 15'; Ernesto Aguirre 67'	Referee: Juan Torres

5 July 1993	Cienciano	3–0	Unión Huaral	Estadio Garcilaso, Cusco
15:30	Steve Camacho 23'; Iván Paliza 26'; Percy Aguilar 75'			Attendance: 906

10 July 1993	Alianza Atlético	2–1	Universitario	Estadio Campeones del 36, Sullana
13:00	Sergio Ibarra 17'; Pedro Sosa 72'		Gustavo Tempone 58' (pen.)

10 July 1993	Deportivo Sipesa	3–2	Sporting Cristal	Estadio Manuel Gómez Arellano, Chimbote
14:45	Ader Cruz 20' 67'; Oscar Ferreyra		Orlando Prado 22'; Julinho 83'

==== Second leg ====
9 July 1993	Unión Huaral	3–0 (5–4 p)	Cienciano	Estadio Julio Lores Colán, Huaral
15:30	Luis Redher; Cordero

10 July 1993	Deportivo Municipal	2–3 (4–3 p)	León de Huánuco	Estadio Teodoro Lolo Fernández, Lima
	César Loyola 10' 19'		Carlos Dolorier 47' (pen.); Mirko Fae 72'; Cumapa	Attendance: 723
	Penalties
	Castro (penalty scored); Guillermo Ferrari (penalty scored); Solano (penalty scored); Arrelucea (penalty scored)		Mirko Fae (penalty scored); Portilla (penalty scored); Wendell (penalty scored); Carlos Dolorier (penalty missed); Rosales (penalty missed)

14 July 1993	Universitario	2–1 (3–1 p)	Alianza Atlético	Estadio Teodoro Lolo Fernández, Lima
15:30	Avelino Vega 12'; Alfonso Dulanto 69'		Canti Távara 10'	Attendance: 1,365; Referee: Carlos Álvarez
	Penalties
	Gustavo Tempone (penalty scored); Freitas (penalty scored); Rodríguez (penalty scored)		Aranda (penalty scored); Rocha (penalty missed); Sajinez (penalty missed); Castillo (penalty missed)

14 July 1993	Sporting Cristal	2–2	Deportivo Sipesa	Estadio Nacional, Lima
15:30	Alberto Ramírez 15'; Pedro Garay 75'		Oscar Ferreyra 12'; Martín Dall'Orso 20'	Referee: Ramírez

=== Semifinals ===
Team 1	Agg.	Team 2	1st leg	2nd leg
Deportivo Municipal	1–0	Universitario	0–0	1–0
Unión Huaral	1–3	Deportivo Sipesa	0–2	1–1

==== First leg ====
18 July 1993	Deportivo Municipal	0–0	Universitario	Estadio Nacional, Lima
15:30				Attendance: 2,211; Referee: Antonio Arnao

18 July 1993	Unión Huaral	0–2	Deportivo Sipesa	Estadio Julio Lores Colán, Huaral
15:30			Martín Dall'Orso 53' 68'	Attendance: 2,000

==== Second leg ====
21 July 1993	Universitario	0–1	Deportivo Municipal	Estadio Teodoro Lolo Fernández, Lima
15:30			César Loyola 21'	Attendance: 3,252; Referee: Luis Seminario

21 July 1993	Deportivo Sipesa	1–1	Unión Huaral	Estadio Manuel Gómez Arellano, Chimbote
15:30	Ader Cruz 49'		Rafael Guadalupe 60'

=== Final ===
25 July 1993
15:15

Deportivo Municipal	2–2	Deportivo Sipesa
Eugenio La Rosa 48'; Julio César Antón 90'		Carlos Guillén 25' (pen.); Martín Dall'Orso 64'
Penalties
Nolberto Solano (penalty scored); Guillermo Ferrari (penalty scored); Pedro Olivares (penalty scored); Ernesto Aguirre (penalty scored)	4–3	César Zavala (penalty scored); Carlos Guillén (penalty scored); Juan Carlos Ormeño (penalty scored); Luis Molina (penalty missed); Pedro Novella (penalty missed)

Estadio Alejandro Villanueva, Lima
Referee: José Arana

== See also ==
- 1993 Torneo Descentralizado
- 1993 Peruvian Segunda División
- 1993 Copa Perú
