= 1992 Torneo Descentralizado =

Torneo Descentralizado
- Season: 1992
- Dates: 11 April 1992 – 13 December 1992
- Champions: Universitario
- Runner up: Sporting Cristal
- Relegated: CNI; Hijos de Yurimaguas
- Copa Libertadores: Universitario; Sporting Cristal
- 1993 Copa CONMEBOL: Ovación Sipesa
- Top goalscorer: Marquinho (18 goals)

The 1992 season of the Torneo Descentralizado was the 77th season of the top category of Peruvian football (soccer). It was played by 16 teams.

On November 8, 1992, Universitario secured its twentieth Peruvian Primera División title after defeating San Agustín 4–1. The triumph remains notable as it marked the only occasion on which the club celebrated a championship with a lap of honor at the historic Lolo Fernández Stadium.

== Teams ==
=== Team changes ===
Relegated from 1991 Primera División (Zona Metropolitana)	Relegated from 1991 Primera División (Zona Norte)	Relegated from 1991 Primera División (Zona Centro)	Relegated from 1991 Primera División (Zona Oriente)	Relegated from 1991 Primera División (Zona Sur)
▼ Unión Huaral (9th) ▼ Internazionale (10th) ▼AELU (11th) ▼ Octavio Espinosa (12th)	▼ Deportivo Pacífico (4th) ▼ Atlético Grau (5th) ▼ Atlético Torino (6th) ▼ Juan Aurich (7th) ▼ Deportivo Morba (8th) ▼ Deportivo Cañaña (9th) ▼ Libertad (10th)	▼ Unión Huayllaspanca (3rd) ▼ADT (4th) ▼ Alianza Huánuco (5th) ▼ Mina San Vicente (6th)	▼ Deportivo Bancos (2nd) ▼ Unión Tarapoto (3rd) ▼ Deportivo Comercio (4th) ▼ Deportivo Hospital (Retired)	▼ Aurora (3rd) ▼ Diablos Rojos (4th) ▼ Alfonso Ugarte (5th) ▼ Mariscal Nieto (6th) ▼ Juvenil Los Ángeles (7th) ▼ Coronel Bolognesi (8th)

=== Stadia locations ===
Locations of the 1992 Primera División teams

Team	City	Stadium	Capacity
Alianza Atlético	Sullana	Campeones del 36	8,000
Alianza Lima	Lima	Alejandro Villanueva	35,000
Carlos A. Mannucci	Trujillo	Mansiche	24,000
Cienciano	Cuzco	Garcilaso	42,056
CNI	Iquitos	Max Augustín	24,000
Defensor Lima	Lima	Nacional	45,750
Deportivo Municipal	Lima	Nacional	45,750
Hijos de Yurimaguas	Callao	Miguel Grau	15,000
León de Huánuco	Huánuco	Heraclio Tapia	15,000
Melgar	Arequipa	Mariano Melgar	20,000
San Agustín	Lima	Nacional	45,750
Sport Boys	Callao	Miguel Grau	15,000
Sporting Cristal	Lima	San Martín de Porres	18,000
Unión Minas	Cerro de Pasco	Daniel Alcides Carrión	8,000
UTC	Cajamarca	Héroes de San Ramón	18,000
Universitario	Lima	Teodoro Lolo Fernández	15,000

== League table ==
=== Standings ===
Pos	Team	Pld	W	D	L	GF	GA	GD	Pts	Qualification or relegation
1	Universitario (C)	30	19	5	6	53	23	+30	43	1993 Copa Libertadores
2	Sporting Cristal	30	15	10	5	47	29	+18	40	Liguilla Pre-Libertadores
3	Melgar	30	14	9	7	48	28	+20	37	Liguilla Pre-Libertadores
4	Sport Boys	30	12	12	6	52	35	+17	36	Liguilla Pre-Libertadores
5	Alianza Lima	30	12	11	7	34	22	+12	35	Liguilla Pre-Libertadores
6	Cienciano	30	12	9	9	43	40	+3	33	Liguilla Pre-Libertadores
7	León de Huánuco	30	10	10	10	50	40	+10	30	
8	Unión Minas	30	11	8	11	41	44	−3	30	
9	UTC	30	11	7	12	38	53	−15	29	
10	Deportivo Municipal	30	8	12	10	41	41	0	28	
11	Alianza Atlético	30	10	8	12	35	51	−16	28	
12	Defensor Lima	30	7	12	11	38	46	−8	26	
13	San Agustín	30	7	12	11	34	45	−11	26	
14	Carlos A. Mannucci	30	6	13	11	26	31	−5	25	
15	CNI (R)	30	7	10	13	31	58	−27	24	1993 Copa Perú
16	Hijos de Yurimaguas (R)	30	2	7	21	30	56	−26	11	1993 Segunda División

Updated to match(es) played on December 1992. Source: Rsssf.org Peru 1992
Rules for classification: 1) points; 2) goal difference; 3) number of goals scored.
(C) Champions; (R) Relegated

== Results ==
Home \ Away	AAS	ALI	CAM	CIE	CNI	DEF	MUN	YUR	LEO	MEL	AGU	SBA	CRI	MIN	UTC	UNI
Alianza Atlético		2–1	0–1	2–0	4–1	0–0	3–4	1–0	2–5	1–1	3–1	2–1	2–1	1–1	0–0	1–0
Alianza Lima	2–0		0–0	1–0	4–0	3–1	0–0	1–0	1–1	3–1	5–0	0–0	1–1	2–1	2–1	0–2
Carlos A. Mannucci	0–0	0–0		1–0	1–1	1–1	1–1	2–0	0–0	2–1	2–0	2–2	0–3	2–0	2–0	0–1
Cienciano	3–2	1–0	0–0		4–0	1–0	0–0	2–2	2–1	1–2	0–0	1–2	2–1	4–1	3–1	1–1
CNI	1–1	1–0	1–0	1–4		1–3	2–2	1–0	1–0	1–1	1–1	2–3	2–1	2–0	5–1	0–2
Defensor Lima	4–2	1–1	2–2	5–1	2–2		2–1	2–2	1–1	0–0	1–3	1–3	1–1	0–2	0–1	1–1
Deportivo Municipal	1–1	0–2	5–2	1–1	0–0	0–2		2–1	2–1	2–2	3–2	0–0	1–2	5–0	2–1	0–3
Hijos de Yurimaguas	0–2	0–1	2–2	0–2	2–2	0–2	3–3		3–3	1–1	0–1	3–4	0–1	3–1	4–1	1–2
León de Huánuco	3–0	0–0	1–0	1–2	5–0	1–0	3–0	2–1		2–0	2–1	1–1	2–4	4–1	3–3	1–1
Melgar	3–0	0–1	3–1	0–0	1–1	1–0	3–0	4–1	4–2		3–1	2–0	6–0	2–1	3–1	2–0
San Agustín	3–0	1–1	0–0	1–1	2–2	1–1	0–0	2–1	1–0	3–0		0–0	0–2	2–0	2–2	1–3
Sport Boys	2–2	0–0	1–0	5–2	2–0	2–3	0–2	1–0	3–0	0–0	2–2		1–2	4–1	8–2	1–1
Sporting Cristal	3–0	2–2	1–0	1–1	2–0	2–1	0–0	4–1	0–0	0–0	3–0	1–1		1–1	2–2	2–1
Unión Minas	4–1	4–0	2–2	2–1	3–0	1–0	1–0	3–0	2–1	2–0	0–0	1–1	2–1		1–1	1–1
UTC	2–0	1–0	1–0	2–3	1–0	4–1	1–0	1–0	1–4	2–1	2–1	2–1	0–1	1–1		0–1
Universitario	3–0	1–0	2–0	4–0	6–0	3–2	3–1	1–0	2–0	0–2	4–1	0–1	0–2	2–1	2–0	

Updated to match(es) played on 1992. Source: RSSSF Peru 1992
Legend: Blue = home team win; Yellow = draw; Red = away team win.

== Liguilla Pre-Libertadores ==
The Liguilla Pre-Libertadores was contested by the teams that finished between second and sixth place in the Torneo Descentralizado, as well as the 1992 Torneo Zonal champion, Ovación Sipesa, to determine the Peruvian representative that would earn the country's second berth in the 1993 Copa Libertadores. Sporting Cristal started the Liguilla with a bonus point.

=== Standings ===
Pos	Team	Pld	W	D	L	GF	GA	GD	Pts	Qualification or relegation	CRI	OVA	ALI	SBA	MEL	CIE
1	Sporting Cristal	5	3	2	0	12	5	+7	9	1993 Copa Libertadores		3–1	2–2		1–0	4–0
2	Ovación Sipesa	5	3	0	2	12	10	+2	6	1993 Copa CONMEBOL				2–0	4–0	5–3
3	Alianza Lima	5	2	1	2	11	8	+3	5			4–0		3–2		0–2
4	Sport Boys	5	2	1	2	9	7	+2	5		2–2				2–0	3–0
5	Melgar	5	2	0	3	4	9	−5	4				2–1			
6	Cienciano	5	1	0	4	6	14	−8	2						1–2	

Updated to match(es) played on December, 1992. Source: Rsssf.org Peru 1992
Legend: Blue = home team win; Yellow = draw; Red = away team win.
Rules for classification: 1) points; 2) goal difference; 3) number of goals scored.

=== Results ===
29 November 1992	Ovación Sipesa	2–0	Sport Boys	Estadio Nacional, Lima
12:00	Parko Quiroz 36'; Ader Cruz 66'			Referee: César Córdova

29 November 1992	Sporting Cristal	4–0	Cienciano	Estadio Nacional, Lima
14:00	Carlos Torres 4'; Franco Navarro 36'; Fidel Suárez 39'; Horacio Baldessari 63'			Referee: Luis Seminario

29 November 1992	Melgar	2–1	Alianza Lima	Estadio Nacional, Lima
16:00	Julio Rivera 4' 62'		Marco Valencia 64' (pen.)	Attendance: 20,503; Referee: José Arana

2 December 1992	Cienciano	1–2	Melgar	Estadio Nacional, Lima
15:00	Néstor Mordini 15' (pen.)		Pedro Requena 36'; Ernesto Parmegiani 55'	Referee: Jorge Torres

2 December 1992	Alianza Lima	4–0	Ovación Sipesa	Estadio Nacional, Lima
17:00	Marco Valencia 28' (pen.) 52'; Juan Reynoso 44'; Dario Muchotrigo 76'			Referee: Carlos Hernández

2 December 1992	Sport Boys	2–2	Sporting Cristal	Estadio Nacional, Lima
19:00	Marquinho 35'; Martín Duffó 85'		Oscar Ferreyra 32'; Flavio Maestri 80'	Attendance: 20,108; Referee: Fernando Chappell

6 December 1992	Sporting Cristal	3–1	Ovación Sipesa	Estadio Nacional, Lima
14:00	Roberto Palacios 21'; Flavio Maestri 43' 89'		Carlos Avilés 12'	Referee: Víctor Marañón

6 December 1992	Alianza Lima	0–2	Cienciano	Estadio Nacional, Lima
16:00			Nestor Mordini 13' 75'	Referee: Antonio Arnao

6 December 1992	Sport Boys	2–0	Melgar	Estadio Nacional, Lima
18:00	Víctor Riega 75' (o.g.); Moreno 80'			Attendance: 12,950; Referee: Luis Seminario

9 December 1992	Sport Boys	3–0	Cienciano	Estadio Nacional, Lima
15:00	Germán Carty 8' 46'; Moreno 9'			Referee: José Arana

9 December 1992	Ovación Sipesa	4–0	Melgar	Estadio Nacional, Lima
17:00	Juan Saavedra 7' 77'; Ader Cruz 29'; Edwin Herrera 61'			Referee: Manuel Yupanqui

9 December 1992	Sporting Cristal	2–2	Alianza Lima	Estadio Nacional, Lima
19:00	Carlos Gonzales 39'; Marco Valencia 45'		Carlos Torres 55'; Pedro Garay 65'	Attendance: 8,963; Referee: César Córdova

13 December 1992	Ovación Sipesa	5–3	Cienciano	Estadio Nacional, Lima
14:00	Juan Saavedra; Roberto Arrelucea (pen.); Antenor González		Néstor Mordini; Alfonso Loaiza	Referee: Juan Mondoñedo

13 December 1992	Alianza Lima	3–2	Sport Boys	Estadio Nacional, Lima
16:00	Juan Reynoso 14'; Waldir Sáenz 80'; Jordan Petrov 87'		Marquinho 45'; Marco Oro 51'	Referee: Luis Seminario

13 December 1992	Sporting Cristal	1–0	Melgar	Estadio Nacional, Lima
18:00	Alejandro Cano 81'			Attendance: 10,112; Referee: Alberto Tejada

== See also ==
- 1992 Peruvian Segunda División
- 1992 Torneo Zonal
