= 1992 Sporting Cristal season =

Sporting Cristal
1992 season
- Stadium: San Martín de Porres, Lima
- Torneo Descentralizado: Torneo Descentralizado League: Second (2°); Liguilla Pre-Libertadores: First (1°); Runner-up (2°)
Home colours	Away colours	Third colours

The 1992 Sporting Cristal season were the Thirty-Seventh (37.º) of the club from its foundation in 1955, Thrirty-Seven (37) participations consecutives in the top-flight of Peruvian Primera División (of 76 Editions) with denomination Torneo Descentralizado. In Previous Season the club qualified as Champions National 1st Place of the 1991 Torneo Descentralizado.

Sporting Cristal were a of sixteen (16) clubs in the Twenty-Seventh edition (27.º) Torneo Descentralizado, the competition most important of the Peruvian football. The club played the Peruvian Primera División and Copa Libertadores for Thirteenth (13th) Time.

== Torneo Descentralizado ==
=== Torneo Descentralizado League ===
Pos	Team	Pld	W	D	L	GF	GA	GD	Pts
1	Universitario	30	19	5	6	53	23	+30	43
2	Sporting Cristal	30	15	10	5	47	29	+18	40
3	FBC Melgar	30	14	9	7	48	28	+20	37

== See also ==
- Club Sporting Cristal
- 1992 Torneo Descentralizado
