= 1993 Sporting Cristal season =

Sporting Cristal
1993 season
- Stadium: San Martín de Porres, Lima
- Torneo Descentralizado: Torneo Descentralizado League: Fifth (5°); Liguilla Pre-Libertadores: Second (2°); Third National (3°)
Home colours	Away colours	Third colours

The 1993 Sporting Cristal season were the Thirty-Eighth (38.º) of the club from its foundation in 1955, Thirty-Eight (38) participations consecutives in the top-flight of Peruvian Primera División (of 77 Editions) with denomination Torneo Descentralizado. In Previous Season the club qualified as Runner-up 2nd Place of the 1992 Torneo Descentralizado.

Sporting Cristal were a of sixteen (16) clubs in the Twenty-Eighth edition (28.º) Torneo Descentralizado, the competition most important of the Peruvian football. The club played the Peruvian Primera División and Copa Libertadores for Forteenth (14th) Time.

== Torneo Descentralizado ==
=== Torneo Descentralizado League ===
Pos	Team	Pld	W	D	L	GF	GA	GD	Pts
4	FBC Melgar	30	16	6	8	55	40	+15	38
5	Sporting Cristal	30	16	5	9	68	33	+35	37
6	Deportivo Municipal	30	13	8	9	43	31	+12	34

== See also ==
- Club Sporting Cristal
- 1993 Torneo Descentralizado
