= 1993 FBC Melgar season =

FBC Melgar
1993 season
- Stadium: Estadio Mariano Melgar
- Torneo Descentralizado: Torneo Descentralizado League: Fourth (4°); Pre-Liguilla: Match B Sixth National (6°)
Home colours	Away colours	Third colours

The 1993 FBC Melgar season were the Seventy-nineth (79.º) of the club from its foundation in 1915, Twenty-Four (24) participations in the top-flight of Peruvian Primera División (of 77 Editions) with denomination Torneo Descentralizado. In Previous Season the club qualified as 6th Place of 1992 Torneo Descentralizado.

Melgar were a of sixteen (16) clubs in the Twenty-Eighth edition (28.º) Torneo Descentralizado, the competition most important of the Peruvian football. The club played the Peruvian Primera División.

== Torneo Descentralizado ==
=== Torneo Descentralizado League ===
Pos	Team	Pld	W	D	L	GF	GA	GD	Pts
3	Sport Boys	30	16	9	5	58	32	+26	41
4	FBC Melgar	30	16	6	8	55	40	+15	38
5	Sporting Cristal	30	16	5	9	68	33	+35	37

== See also ==
- FBC Melgar
- 1993 Torneo Descentralizado
