= 1994 FBC Melgar season =

FBC Melgar
1994 season
- Stadium: Estadio Mariano Melgar
- Torneo Descentralizado: Torneo Apertura: Nn (3°); Torneo Descentralizado League: Nn (3°); Pre-Liguilla: Match A Nn National (6°)
Home colours	Away colours	Third colours

The 1994 FBC Melgar season were the Eightieth (80.º) of the club from its foundation in 1915, Twenty-Five (25) participations in the top-flight of Peruvian Primera División (of 78 Editions) with denomination Torneo Descentralizado. In Previous Season the club qualified as 6th Place of 1993 Torneo Descentralizado.

Melgar were a of sixteen (16) clubs in the Twenty-Nineth edition (29.º) Torneo Descentralizado, the competition most important of the Peruvian football. The club played the Peruvian Primera División.

== Torneo Descentralizado ==
=== Torneo Apertura (Group B) ===
Pos	Team	Pld	W	D	L	GF	GA	GD	Pts
3	Deportivo Municipal	7	3	2	2	8	7	+1	8
4	FBC Melgar	7	3	1	3	10	5	+5	7
5	Carlos A. Mannucci	7	2	3	2	9	8	+1	7

== See also ==
- FBC Melgar
- 1994 Torneo Descentralizado
