= 1993 Copa Perú =

Copa Perú
- Season: 1993
- Champions: Aurich-Cañaña
- Top goalscorer: Richard Vinatea (6)

The 1993 Copa Perú season (Spanish: Copa Perú 1993), the promotion tournament of Peruvian football.

In this tournament after many qualification rounds, each one of the 24 departments in which Peru is politically divided, qualify a team. Those teams plus the team relegated from First Division are divided in 6 groups by geographical proximity and each group winner goes to the Final round, staged in Lima (the capital).

The champion was promoted to 1994 Torneo Descentralizado.

== Team changes ==
Relegated from 1992 Torneo Zonal (Zonal I)	Relegated from 1992 Segunda División (Zonal II)	Relegated from 1992 Torneo Zonal (Zonal III)	Relegated from 1992 Torneo Zonal (Zonal IV)
▼ Deportivo Cañaña (2nd) ▼ Deportivo Pacífico (3rd) ▼ Unión Tarapoto (4th) ▼ Atlético Torino (5th) ▼ El Tumi (6th) ▼ Atlético Grau (7th) ▼ Morba (8th) ▼ Juan Aurich (9th) ▼ José Olaya (Talara) (10th)	▼ Sport Puerto Aéreo (11th) ▼ Internazionale (12th)	▼ Deportivo Bancos (1st) ▼ Mina San Vicente (2nd) ▼ Huracán Pilcomayo (3rd) ▼ Alianza Huánuco (4th) ▼ Unión Huayllaspanca (5th) ▼ La Victoria (6th) ▼ADT (7th)	▼ Alfonso Ugarte (1st) ▼ Sportivo Huracán (2nd) ▼ Aurora (3rd) ▼ Mariscal Nieto (4th) ▼ Coronel Bolognesi (5th) ▼ Juvenil Los Ángeles (6th) ▼ Diablos Rojos (7th) ▼ Estudiantes Garcilaso (8th)

== Departmental Stage ==
The following list shows the teams that qualified for the Regional Stage.

Department	Team	Location
Ancash	Unión Juventud	Chimbote
Arequipa	Aurora	Arequipa
Cusco	Deportivo Garcilaso	Cusco
Huánuco	Mariano Santos	Tingo María
Lambayaque	Aurich-Cañaña	Chiclayo
Loreto	CNI	Iquitos

== Interregional Stage ==
Team 1	Agg.	Team 2	1st leg	2nd leg
José Olaya (Paita)	–	Aurich-Cañaña	0–2	–
San Antonio	–	CNI	–	–
Cosmos San Isidro	3–5	Unión Juventud	1–1	2–4
ADT	1–1	Mariano Santos	1–0	0–1
Deportivo Garcilaso	–	Cultural Santa Rosa	2–2	–
Aurora	–	Carlos Varela	3–1	–

=== Tiebreaker ===
Team 1	Score	Team 2
ADT	–	Mariano Santos
Aurora	–	Carlos Varea

== Final Stage ==
=== Standings ===
Pos	Team	Pld	W	D	L	GF	GA	GD	Pts	Promotion
1	Aurich–Cañaña (C)	5	4	1	0	11	5	+6	9	1994 Torneo Descentralizado
2	Aurora	5	3	1	1	9	4	+5	7	Promotion playoff
3	Mariano Santos	5	3	0	2	7	6	+1	6	
4	Unión Juventud	5	2	0	3	8	3	+5	4	
5	Deportivo Garcilaso	5	1	1	3	3	12	−9	3	
6	CNI	5	0	1	4	6	14	−8	1	

(C) Champions

=== Results ===
==== Round 1 ====
2 January 1994	Deportivo Garcilaso	1–1	CNI	Nacional, Lima

2 January 1994	Aurich–Cañaña	2–1	Mariano Santos	Nacional, Lima

2 January 1994	Aurora	1–0	Unión Juventud	Nacional, Lima

==== Round 2 ====
5 January 1994	Mariano Santos	1–0	Unión Juventud	Nacional, Lima

5 January 1994	Aurora	1–0	CNI	Nacional, Lima

5 January 1994	Aurich–Cañaña	3–0	Deportivo Garcilaso	Nacional, Lima

==== Round 3 ====
9 January 1994	Mariano Santos	4–3	CNI	Nacional, Lima

9 January 1994	Aurora	5–1	Deportivo Garcilaso	Nacional, Lima

9 January 1994	Aurich–Cañaña	1–0	Unión Juventud	Nacional, Lima

==== Round 4 ====
12 January 1994	Unión Juventud	3–0	Deportivo Garcilaso	Nacional, Lima

12 January 1994	Mariano Santos	1–0	Aurora	Nacional, Lima

12 January 1994	Aurich–Cañaña	3–2	CNI	Nacional, Lima

==== Round 5 ====
16 January 1994	Deportivo Garcilaso	1–0	Mariano Santos	Nacional, Lima

16 January 1994	Unión Juventud	5–0	CNI	Nacional, Lima

16 January 1994	Aurich–Cañaña	2–2	Aurora	Nacional, Lima

== Promotion / Relegation play-off ==
23 January 1994	Defensor Lima	3–3 (a.e.t.) (7–6 p)	Aurora	Estadio Nacional, Lima
15:30	Alexis Ubillús 34'; Manuel Dávila 55'; Luis Mexo 111'		Edgar Abarca; Wilfredo Begazo 29'; Manuel Vinces 96' (o.g.)	Attendance: 5,579; Referee: Antonio Arnao
	Penalties
	Manuel Dávila (penalty scored); Alfredo Carmona (penalty scored); Luis Mexo (penalty missed); Sandro Cavero (penalty missed); Ramón Perleche (penalty scored); José Cajat (penalty scored); Luis García (penalty scored); Reynaldo Arzola (penalty scored); Manuel Vinces (penalty missed); Manuel Munayco (penalty scored)		Genaro Neyra (penalty missed); Edgar Abarca (penalty scored); Roberto Revilla (penalty scored); José Zegarra (penalty scored); Miguel Zevallos (penalty missed); Wilfredo Begazo (penalty scored); Mynor Jiménez (penalty scored); Ubaldo Puma (penalty scored); Renzo Ampuero (penalty missed); Gerardo Abarca (penalty missed)

Defensor Lima remains in the First Division.

== See also ==
- 1993 Torneo Descentralizado
- 1993 Peruvian Segunda División
