= Deportivo Bancos =

Peruvian football club

- Full name: Club Social Deportivo Bancos
- Nickname: Canarios
- Founded: 1954
- Ground: Aliardo Soria Pérez, Pucallpa
- Capacity: 15,000
- Chairman: Roy Panduro
- Manager: Gregory Farfán
- League: Copa Perú
- 2013: Eliminated in Regional Stage
Home colours	Away colours

Deportivo Bancos is a Peruvian football club, playing in the city of Pucallpa, Peru. The club was founded on July 11, 1954, and currently competes in the Copa Perú.

== History ==
Club Deportivo Bancos was founded on July 11, 1954, and enjoyed its golden era during the 1990s, when it competed in the top flight during the Regional Championships period.

=== Debut in the Peruvian First Division ===
In 1990, the club made its first appearance in the top tier, taking part in Regional I and II of the Oriente Zone. It did not have a major impact, but it managed to retain its place in the division. That season’s champions were Deportivo Hospital (Regional I) and Unión Tarapoto (Regional II).

In 1991, the club came close to reaching the Descentralizado. Although CNI won both Regional I and II, Bancos faced them in a playoff due to the reduction of teams, with a spot in the 1992 Torneo Descentralizado at stake. However, they lost that match 4–1 in Lima, which resulted in their relegation to the 1992 Torneo Zonal.

=== 1992 Torneo Zonal Campaign ===
In 1992, after winning Zonal III—eliminating teams such as Alianza Huánuco, Pilcomayo, Mina San Vicente, Unión Huayllaspanca, La Victoria, and ADT de Tarma—the club advanced to the final four stage against the other zonal champions: Ovación Sipesa (Zonal I), Unión Huaral (Zonal II), and Alfonso Ugarte (Zonal IV).

This final stage granted promotion to the Descentralizado for the winner. However, “Los Canarios” struggled, winning only two of their six matches: a 1–0 victory over Ovación Sipesa and a 2–0 win against Alfonso Ugarte. They lost the remaining four matches: 3–0 defeats to both Ovación Sipesa and Alfonso Ugarte, and 4–1 and 2–0 losses against Unión Huaral.

They finished with four points in fourth place (last), which meant they had to return to the Copa Perú the following year.

== Rivalries ==
Deportivo Bancos has had a long-standing rivalry with local club Deportivo Pucallpa.

== Honours ==
=== Senior titles ===
Keys

- Record
- ^{(s)} Shared record

Type	Competition	Titles	Runner-up	Winning years	Runner-up years
Half-year / Short tournament (League)	Torneo Zona Oriente	1	1	1991–II	1991–I
Regional (League)	Liga Departamental de Ucayali	2	2	1988, 2026	2009, 2013
Regional (League)	Liga Provincial de Coronel Portillo	3	2	1967, 2009, 2013	1955, 2026
Regional (League)	Liga Distrital de Callería	3	2	2009, 2013, 2017	2022, 2026

== See also ==
- List of football clubs in Peru
- Peruvian football league system
