= 1992 Peruvian Torneo Zonal =

Torneo Zonal
- Season: 1992
- Champions: Ovación Sipesa
- Runner up: Unión Huaral

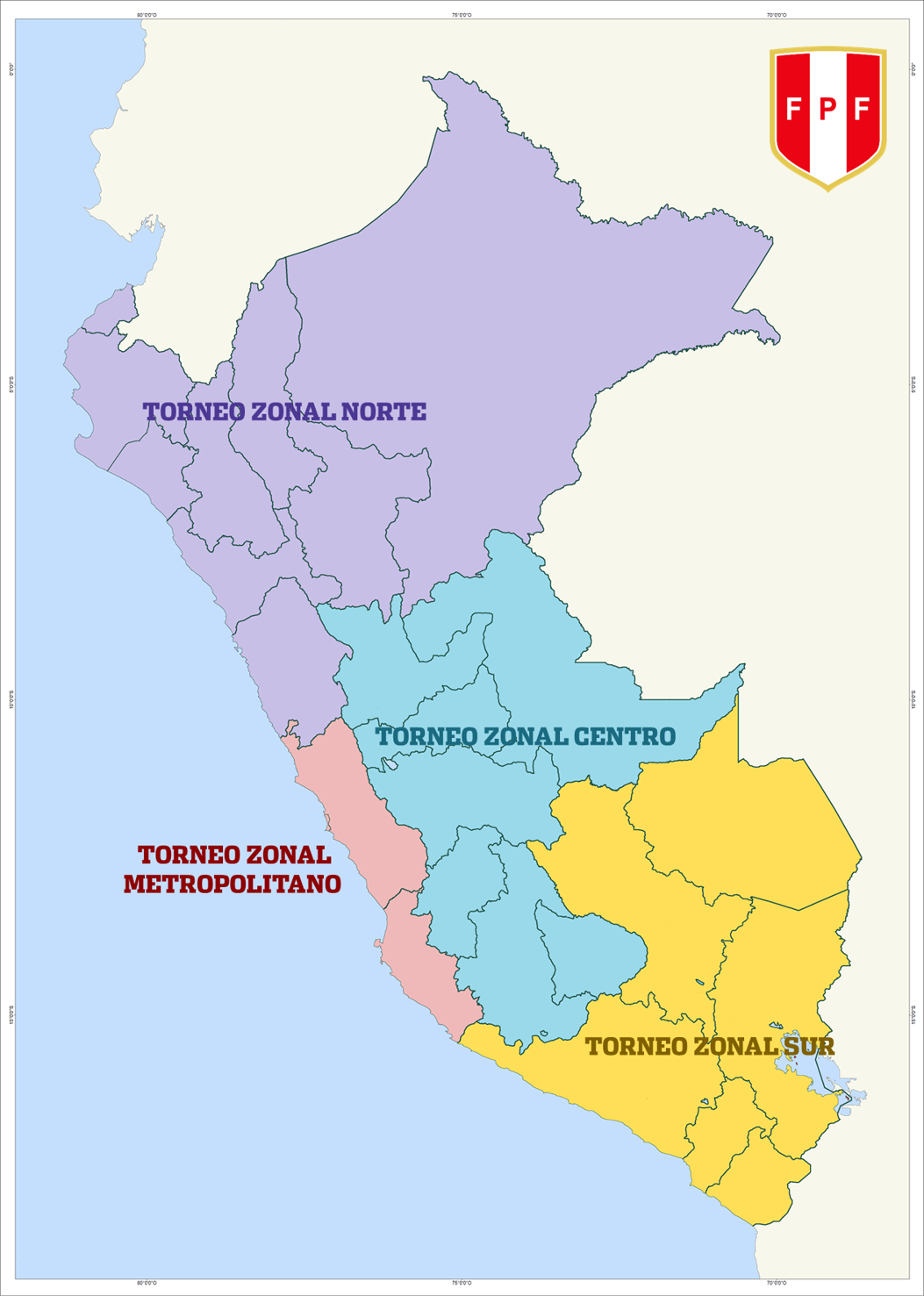
Division of the 1992 Zonal Tournaments.

The Torneo Zonal, the second division of Peruvian football (soccer) in 1992, was played by 37 teams. the tournament winner, Ovación Sipesa was promoted to the 1992 Liguilla Pre-Libertadores and 1993 Torneo Descentralizado. The tournament was played on a home-and-away round-robin basis.

== History ==
In 1991, the Peruvian Football Federation decided to play the last of the Torneo Regionales of 44 teams to go back to have a tournament of 16 teams for the 1992 Torneo Descentralizado.

The teams descended of the 1991 Torneo Descentralizado, would play the Torneo Zonal with the teams of the Peruvian Primera División

The champion of the tournament would play the 1992 Liguilla Pre-Libertadores by a place to the 1993 Copa CONMEBOL or to the 1993 Copa Libertadores, besides would play with the runner-up in the 1993 Torneo Descentralizado.

== Teams ==
=== Team changes ===
Promoted from 1991 Etapa Regional	Relegated from 1991 Primera División (Zona Metropolitana)	Relegated from 1991 Primera División (Zona Norte)	Relegated from 1991 Primera División (Zona Centro)	Relegated from 1991 Primera División (Zona Oriente)	Relegated from 1991 Primera División (Zona Sur)
▲ José Olaya (Talara) (Región I) ▲ Ovación Sipesa (Región II) ▲ El Tumi (Región III) ▲ Sport Puerto Aéreo (Región IV) ▲ Huracán Pilcomayo (Región V) ▲ Sportivo Huracán (Región VI) ▲ Estudiantes Garcilaso (Región VII) ▲ La Victoria (Región VIII) ▲ Alcides Vigo (Región IX)	▼ Unión Huaral (9th) ▼ Internazionale (10th) ▼AELU (11th) ▼ Octavio Espinosa (12th)	▼ Deportivo Pacífico (4th) ▼ Atlético Grau (5th) ▼ Atlético Torino (6th) ▼ Juan Aurich (7th) ▼ Deportivo Morba (8th) ▼ Deportivo Cañaña (9th) ▼ Libertad (10th)	▼ Unión Huayllaspanca (3rd) ▼ADT (4th) ▼ Alianza Huánuco (5th) ▼ Mina San Vicente (6th)	▼ Deportivo Bancos (2nd) ▼ Unión Tarapoto (3rd) ▼ Deportivo Comercio (4th) ▼ Deportivo Hospital (Retired)	▼ Aurora (3rd) ▼ Diablos Rojos (4th) ▼ Alfonso Ugarte (5th) ▼ Mariscal Nieto (6th) ▼ Juvenil Los Ángeles (7th) ▼ Coronel Bolognesi (8th)

== Torneo Zonal ==
=== Zonal I ===
Pos	Team	Pld	W	D	L	GF	GA	GD	Pts	Qualification or relegation	OVA	CAÑ	PAC	TAR	TOR	TUM	Grau	MOR	JAU	OLA
1	Ovación Sipesa	17	12	1	4	31	7	+24	25	Final Group										
2	Deportivo Cañaña	16	7	8	1	14	4	+10	22	1993 Copa Perú										
3	Deportivo Pacífico	16	8	3	5	21	13	+8	19	1993 Copa Perú										
4	Unión Tarapoto	16	7	1	8	14	24	−10	15	1993 Copa Perú										
5	Atlético Torino	17	6	6	5	16	14	+2	18	1993 Copa Perú										
6	El Tumi	17	7	4	6	19	22	−3	18	1993 Copa Perú										
7	Atlético Grau	17	5	5	7	16	25	−9	15	1993 Copa Perú										
8	Deportivo Morba	17	6	3	8	19	22	−3	15	1993 Copa Perú										
9	Juan Aurich	17	2	7	8	17	18	−1	11	1993 Copa Perú										
10	José Olaya (Talara)	16	1	6	9	8	26	−18	8	1993 Copa Perú										

Source: Diario El Comercio
Legend: Blue = home team win; Yellow = draw; Red = away team win.

=== Zonal II ===
Pos	Team	Pld	W	D	L	GF	GA	GD	Pts	Qualification or relegation
1	Unión Huaral	22	14	8	0	43	13	+30	36	Final Group
2	Defensor Kiwi–Ciclista Lima	22	14	6	2	42	15	+27	34	
3	Guardia Republicana	22	11	8	3	28	13	+15	30	
4	Deportivo Zuñiga	22	12	3	7	27	18	+9	27	
5	Bella Esperanza	22	9	8	5	30	19	+11	26	
6	AELU	22	8	7	7	31	26	+5	23	
7	Enrique Lau Chun	22	8	6	8	28	26	+2	22	
8	Meteor–Lawn Tennis	22	7	8	7	27	27	0	22	
9	Alcides Vigo	22	7	6	9	28	36	−8	20	
10	Octavio Espinosa	22	6	2	14	21	40	−19	14	
11	Sport Puerto Aéreo	22	2	6	14	19	47	−28	10	1993 Copa Perú
12	Internazionale	22	0	0	22	0	44	−44	0	1993 Copa Perú

Source: Diario El Comercio

=== Zonal III ===
Pos	Team	Pld	W	D	L	GF	GA	GD	Pts	Qualification or relegation	BAN	MSV	PIL	AHU	HUA	LVH	ADT
1	Deportivo Bancos	11	7	1	3	24	12	+12	15	Final Group							
2	Mina San Vicente	11	5	5	1	20	8	+12	15	1993 Copa Perú							
3	Huracán Pilcomayo	12	5	3	4	24	17	+7	13	1993 Copa Perú							
4	Alianza Huánuco	11	4	5	2	13	13	0	13	1993 Copa Perú							
5	Unión Huayllaspanca	11	4	3	4	17	15	+2	11	1993 Copa Perú							
6	La Victoria	11	3	1	7	9	27	−18	7	1993 Copa Perú							
7	ADT	11	1	2	8	8	23	−15	4	1993 Copa Perú							

Source: Diario El Comercio
Legend: Blue = home team win; Yellow = draw; Red = away team win.

=== Zonal IV ===
Pos	Team	Pld	W	D	L	GF	GA	GD	Pts	Qualification or relegation	HUR	AUR	MNI	AU	BOL	JLÁ	DRJ	GAR
1	Sportivo Huracán	14	9	3	2	29	8	+21	21	Zonal IV - Liguilla								
2	Aurora	14	8	4	2	26	13	+13	20	Zonal IV - Liguilla								
3	Mariscal Nieto	14	6	3	5	21	16	+5	15	Zonal IV - Liguilla								
4	Alfonso Ugarte	14	5	4	5	16	9	+7	14	Zonal IV - Liguilla								
5	Coronel Bolognesi	14	4	4	6	9	16	−7	12	1993 Copa Perú								
6	Juvenil Los Ángeles	14	2	6	6	8	19	−11	10	1993 Copa Perú								
7	Diablos Rojos	14	3	4	7	8	22	−14	10	1993 Copa Perú								
8	Estudiantes Garcilaso	14	5	0	9	17	31	−14	10	1993 Copa Perú								

Source: Diario El Comercio
Legend: Blue = home team win; Yellow = draw; Red = away team win.

==== Liguilla ====
Pos	Team	Pld	W	D	L	GF	GA	GD	Pts	Qualification or relegation	AU	HUR	AUR	MNI
1	Alfonso Ugarte	3	3	0	0	5	1	+4	6	Final Group		1–0	—	
2	Sportivo Huracán	3	1	0	2	3	3	0	2	1993 Copa Perú				—
3	Aurora	2	1	0	1	2	3	−1	2	1993 Copa Perú		—		n.p.
4	Mariscal Nieto	2	0	0	2	1	4	−3	0	1993 Copa Perú	—			

Source: Diario El Comercio
Legend: Blue = home team win; Yellow = draw; Red = away team win.

== Final Group ==
=== Standings ===
Pos	Team	Pld	W	D	L	GF	GA	GD	Pts	Qualification or relegation	OVA	UNI	UGA	BAN
1	Ovación Sipesa (C)	6	3	1	2	8	2	+6	7	1993 Primera División and 1992 Liguilla Pre-Libertadores		0–0	4–0	3–0
2	Unión Huaral	6	3	1	2	7	3	+4	7	1993 Primera División	0–1		1–0	2–0
3	Alfonso Ugarte	6	3	0	3	5	7	−2	6	1993 Copa Perú	1–0	1–0		3–0
4	Deportivo Bancos	6	2	0	4	4	12	−8	4	1993 Copa Perú	1–0	1–4	2–0	

Source: Diario El Comercio
Legend: Blue = home team win; Yellow = draw; Red = away team win.
(C) Champions

=== Results ===
11 October 1992	Ovación Sipesa	3–0	Deportivo Bancos	Estadio Manuel Gómez Arellano, Chimbote
15:30	Juan Saavedra 7' 49'; Ader Cruz 69'			Attendance: 8,000

11 October 1992	Unión Huaral	1–0	Alfonso Ugarte	Estadio Julio Lores Colan, Huaral
15:30	Juan Palomares 71'

18 October 1992	Deportivo Bancos	1–4	Unión Huaral	Estadio Aliardo Soria Pérez, Pucallpa
15:30	Juan Antonio Rojas 12'		Luis Redher 24' 34'; Juan Palomares 62'; Miguel Elguera 82'	Attendance: 1,750; Referee: Alejandro Villanueva

18 October 1992	Ovación Sipesa	4–0	Alfonso Ugarte	Estadio Manuel Gómez Arellano, Chimbote
15:30	Ader Cruz 36'; Juan Gallardo 48'; Parko Quiroz 77'; Hernán Cumpa 80'			Referee: Jorge Torres

25 October 1992	Alfonso Ugarte	3–0	Deportivo Bancos	Estadio E. Torres Belón, Puno
15:30

25 October 1992	Unión Huaral	0–1	Ovación Sipesa	Estadio Julio Lores Colan, Huaral
15:30			Parcko Quiroz 89'	Referee: Félix Arredondo

1 November 1992	Deportivo Bancos	1–0	Ovación Sipesa	Estadio Aliardo Soria Pérez, Pucallpa
	José Rojas Abanto 63'

1 November 1992	Alfonso Ugarte	1–0	Unión Huaral	Estadio E. Torres Belón, Puno
	Andrés Ramos 79'			Referee: Víctor Marañón

8 November 1992	Alfonso Ugarte	1–0	Ovación Sipesa	Estadio E. Torres Belón, Puno
15:30	Germán Avendaño 41'

8 November 1992	Unión Huaral	2–0	Deportivo Bancos	Estadio Julio Lores Colan, Huaral
15:30	José Medina 57'; Luis Rheder 73'

15 November 1992	Deportivo Bancos	2–0	Alfonso Ugarte	Estadio Aliardo Soria Pérez, Pucallpa
15:30	José Rojas 49' 53'

15 November 1992	Ovación Sipesa	0–0	Unión Huaral	Estadio Manuel Gómez Arellano, Chimbote
15:30				Referee: Jorge Torres

==== Liguilla Pre-Libertadores play-off ====
18 November 1992	Ovación Sipesa	4–2	Unión Huaral	Estadio Nacional, Lima
16:00	Carlos Avilés 11' 36'; Juan Saavedra 63'; Eder Cruz 87'		Luis Rheder 23' 43'	Referee: Antonio Arnao

== See also ==
- 1992 Torneo Descentralizado
- 1992 Peruvian Segunda División
