= 1993 Torneo Descentralizado =

Torneo Descentralizado
- Season: 1993
- Dates: 27 February 1993 – 22 December 1993
- Champions: Universitario; 11th Descentralizado title 14th professional title 21st Primera División title
- Runner up: Alianza Lima
- Relegated: Unión Huaral; UTC
- Copa Libertadores: Universitario; Alianza Lima
- Copa CONMEBOL: Sporting Cristal
- Top goalscorer: Waldir Sáenz (31 goals)

The 1993 Torneo Descentralizado was the 78th season of the top category of Peruvian football (soccer). A total of 16 teams competed in the tournament. The season was known as the “Gran Copa Faucett” for sponsorship reasons.

On November 28, 1993, Universitario won the Peruvian Primera División title and secured a memorable consecutive championship after defeating San Agustín 3–0 at the Estadio Nacional.

== Changes from 1992 ==
- Due to the 1993 Copa América, a minor tournament (1993 Torneo Intermedio) was played in the middle of the year among 16 clubs. The winner would qualify for the 1994 Copa CONMEBOL.
- The end-of-season Liguilla would feature 4 teams, instead of 6.
- A preliminary round prior to the Liguilla would be played with the teams that placed 3 to 8 to determine the 3 teams that join the second-placed team in the Liguilla.
- The third-to-last team in the Torneo Descentralizado plays a relegation playoff against Copa Perú runner-up.

== Teams ==
=== Team changes ===
Promoted from 1992 Torneo Zonal	Relegated from 1992 Primera División
▲ Ovación Sipesa (1st) ▲ Unión Huaral (2nd)	▼CNI (15th) ▼ Hijos de Yurimaguas (16th)

=== Stadia locations ===
Locations of the 1993 Primera División teams

Team	City	Stadium	Capacity
Alianza Atlético	Sullana	Campeones del 36	8,000
Alianza Lima	Lima	Alejandro Villanueva	35,000
Carlos A. Mannucci	Trujillo	Mansiche	24,000
Cienciano	Cusco	Garcilaso	42,056
Defensor Lima	Lima	Nacional	45,750
Deportivo Municipal	Lima	Nacional	45,750
Deportivo Sipesa	Chimbote	Manuel Gómez Arellano	25,000
León de Huánuco	Huánuco	Heraclio Tapia	15,000
Melgar	Arequipa	Mariano Melgar	20,000
San Agustín	Lima	Nacional	45,750
Sport Boys	Callao	Miguel Grau	18,000
Sporting Cristal	Lima	San Martín de Porres	15,000
Unión Huaral	Huaral	Julio Lores Colan	10,000
Unión Minas	Cerro de Pasco	Daniel Alcides Carrión	8,000
UTC	Cajamarca	Héroes de San Ramón	18,000
Universitario	Lima	Teodoro Lolo Fernández	15,000

== League table ==
The Torneo Descentralizado was played with as a double round-robin tournament. Universitario de Deportes as champions qualified for the 1994 Copa Libertadores. Alianza Lima advanced to the end-of-season Liguilla and received a bonus point for placing second. The teams that placed 3 to 8 advanced to a preliminary round.

=== Standings ===
Pos	Team	Pld	W	D	L	GF	GA	GD	Pts	Qualification or relegation
1	Universitario (C)	30	19	7	4	46	18	+28	45	1994 Copa Libertadores
2	Alianza Lima	30	17	7	6	70	36	+34	41	Liguilla Pre-Libertadores with 1 bonus point
3	Sport Boys	30	16	9	5	58	32	+26	41	Pre-Liguilla
4	Melgar	30	16	6	8	55	40	+15	38	Pre-Liguilla
5	Sporting Cristal	30	16	5	9	68	33	+35	37	Pre-Liguilla
6	Deportivo Municipal	30	13	8	9	43	31	+12	34	Pre-Liguilla
7	Deportivo Sipesa	30	12	8	10	39	29	+10	32	Pre-Liguilla
8	Carlos A. Mannucci	30	12	6	12	36	40	−4	30	Pre-Liguilla
9	Cienciano	30	10	9	11	27	36	−9	29	
10	San Agustín	30	9	8	13	31	50	−19	26	
11	León de Huánuco	30	6	12	12	29	40	−11	24	
12	Unión Minas	30	6	10	14	23	50	−27	22	
13	Alianza Atlético	30	6	10	14	35	64	−29	22	
14	Defensor Lima (O)	30	7	7	16	46	56	−10	21	Promotion/relegation play-off
15	Unión Huaral (R)	30	5	9	16	45	65	−20	19	1994 Segunda División
16	UTC (R)	30	7	5	18	34	65	−31	19	1994 Copa Perú

(C) Champions; (O) Play-off winners; (R) Relegated

== Results ==
Home \ Away	AAS	ALI	CAM	CIE	DEF	MUN	SIP	LEO	MEL	AGU	SBA	CRI	HUA	MIN	UTC	UNI
Alianza Atlético		3–3	1–0	0–0	2–0	2–3	2–4	1–1	2–1	1–2	1–4	0–0	1–0	3–1	3–1	1–1
Alianza Lima	3–1		4–0	5–1	4–2	0–1	1–1	0–1	7–2	4–0	1–0	2–0	4–2	6–0	6–2	0–1
Carlos A. Mannucci	2–0	1–1		1–0	2–1	2–1	0–4	0–0	1–2	1–0	2–0	1–0	4–4	2–0	0–0	1–3
Cienciano	1–1	1–2	1–0		1–0	1–0	2–1	1–1	0–2	2–1	5–0	0–0	2–1	2–0	0–0	0–0
Defensor Lima	3–3	0–2	1–2	2–3		1–1	2–1	3–1	2–2	1–2	0–2	1–2	2–2	2–0	3–1	0–1
Deportivo Municipal	4–0	2–3	1–0	2–0	3–0		1–0	2–1	1–1	2–0	0–1	0–3	2–0	3–1	2–1	0–0
Deportivo Sipesa	2–0	2–1	0–1	0–0	1–1	2–2		1–0	3–0	1–2	1–1	1–0	4–2	1–1	1–0	0–1
León de Huánuco	3–0	0–0	0–1	1–0	2–1	1–1	1–3		1–2	1–1	1–1	1–2	2–2	2–1	1–0	0–1
Melgar	5–0	2–0	1–0	3–0	1–1	2–1	1–1	1–1		2–1	1–2	2–0	2–1	4–0	4–1	2–1
San Agustín	2–2	2–3	1–0	1–0	0–6	2–2	0–0	1–1	1–0		1–3	2–4	2–2	0–0	2–1	0–3
Sport Boys	4–0	1–1	3–1	2–0	5–3	0–0	2–0	4–0	1–2	1–1		2–0	3–3	2–0	7–1	0–2
Sporting Cristal	3–0	5–1	5–3	7–0	1–2	1–1	2–1	4–1	6–2	3–0	1–1		1–0	8–0	3–0	1–0
Unión Huaral	2–2	3–3	0–4	2–0	2–3	1–3	2–1	2–2	1–1	1–2	1–2	4–2		1–0	1–0	0–3
Unión Minas	2–1	0–1	2–2	0–0	1–1	2–1	0–1	1–1	1–0	2–0	1–1	1–1	2–1		3–1	0–0
UTC	2–2	0–2	1–1	0–3	4–1	1–0	1–0	2–1	2–5	0–2	1–2	2–1	3–1	1–1		4–3
Universitario	4–0	0–0	3–1	1–1	2–1	2–1	0–1	1–0	1–0	1–0	1–1	2–1	3–1	1–0	4–1	

Updated to match(es) played on 1993. Source: RSSSF Peru 1993
Legend: Blue = home team win; Yellow = draw; Red = away team win.

== Pre-Liguilla ==
Team 1	Agg.	Team 2	1st leg	2nd leg
Sport Boys	4–3	Carlos A. Mannucci	3–1	1–2
Deportivo Sipesa	5–3	Melgar	3–1	2–2
Sporting Cristal	3–2	Deportivo Municipal	1–0	2–2

=== First leg ===
5 December 1993	Sport Boys	3–1	Carlos A. Mannucci	Estadio Nacional, Lima
14:00	Carlos Flores 61'; Oswaldo Araujo 72' 83'		Fidel Castro 51'	Referee: Roberto Soto

5 December 1993	Deportivo Sipesa	3–1	Melgar	Estadio Manuel Gómez Arellano, Chimbote
15:30	Jorge Hirano; Martín Dall'Orso 63'; Jorge Gallardo 71'		Jorge Zabala (o.g.)	Attendance: 6,518; Referee: Luis Díaz

5 December 1993	Sporting Cristal	1–0	Deportivo Municipal	Estadio Nacional, Lima
16:00	Flavio Maestri 60'			Attendance: 8,167; Referee: César Córdova

=== Second leg ===
8 December 1993	Carlos A. Mannucci	2–1	Sport Boys	Estadio Mansiche, Trujillo
15:30	Alejandro Malqui 56'; Miguel Sarmiento 70'		Marco Charún 76'	Attendance: 2,832; Referee: Jorge Torres

8 December 1993	Melgar	2–2	Deportivo Sipesa	Estadio Mariano Melgar, Arequipa
15:30	Ricardo Zegarra 2' 79'		Ricardo Vieira 2' (pen.); Jorge Hirano 61'	Attendance: 7,000; Referee: Alberto Tejada

8 December 1993	Deportivo Municipal	2–2	Sporting Cristal	Estadio Nacional, Lima
19:00	Nolberto Solano 22' (pen.); Elvis Neyra 28'		Julinho 5'; Flavio Maestri 55'	Attendance: 3,719; Referee: Víctor Marañón

Deportivo Sipesa, Sport Boys and Sporting Cristal qualified for the Liguilla Pre-Libertadores.

== Liguilla Pre-Libertadores ==
Alianza Lima started the Liguilla with a bonus point. Alianza Lima and Sporting Cristal tied for first placed, forcing a playoff match to determine the second Peruvian club in the 1994 Copa Libertadores. Although Sporting Cristal lost the playoff match, they qualified for the 1994 Copa CONMEBOL after Deportivo Municipal declined to play in it.

=== Standings ===
Pos	Team	Pld	W	D	L	GF	GA	GD	Pts	Qualification or relegation	ALI	SC	SBA	SIP
1	Alianza Lima	3	2	0	1	6	3	+3	5	1994 Copa Libertadores			2–0	3–1
2	Sporting Cristal	3	2	1	0	9	1	+8	5	1994 Copa CONMEBOL	2–1		7–0	
3	Sport Boys	3	1	0	2	4	12	−8	2					4–3
4	Deportivo Sipesa	3	0	1	2	4	7	−3	1			0–0		

Legend: Blue = home team win; Yellow = draw; Red = away team win.

=== Results ===
12 December 1993	Sporting Cristal	7–0	Sport Boys	Estadio Nacional, Lima
14:00	Flavio Maestri 5' 50' 87'; Julinho 12' 24'; Julio Rivera 65' 85'			Referee: Wilfredo Novoa

12 December 1993	Alianza Lima	3–1	Deportivo Sipesa	Estadio Nacional, Lima
16:00	Waldir Sáenz 4' 28'; Marco Valencia 88'		Ricardo Vieira 45'	Attendance: 24,974; Referee: César Córdova

15 December 1993	Sport Boys	4–3	Deportivo Sipesa	Estadio Nacional, Lima
14:00	Carlos Flores 24' (pen.); Néstor Mordini 27' (pen.); Carlos Valerio 73'; Germán Carty 84'		Juan Carlos Balerio 4' (pen.); Ricardo Viera 50' (pen.) 52' (pen.)	Referee: Víctor Marañón

15 December 1993	Sporting Cristal	2–1	Alianza Lima	Estadio Nacional, Lima
16:00	Flavio Maestri 35'; Pablo Zegarra 55'		Marco Valencia 80' (pen.)	Attendance: 36,933; Referee: Alberto Tejada

19 December 1993	Deportivo Sipesa	0–0	Sporting Cristal	Estadio Nacional, Lima
14:00				Referee: Antonio Arnao

19 December 1993	Alianza Lima	2–0	Sport Boys	Estadio Nacional, Lima
16:00	Claudio Pedraglio 6' (o.g.); Waldir Sáenz 74'			Attendance: 10,156; Referee: Luis Diaz

=== Liguilla play-off ===
22 December 1993	Alianza Lima	1–1 (a.e.t.) (5–4 p)	Sporting Cristal	Estadio Nacional, Lima
20:00	Waldir Sáenz 54'		Roberto Palacios 75'	Attendance: 29,480; Referee: César Córdova
	Penalties
	Marco Valencia (penalty scored); José Soto (penalty scored); Mario Antonio Rodríguez (penalty scored); Carlos Basombrío (penalty scored); Wilmar Valencia (penalty missed); Waldir Sáenz (penalty scored)		Jorge Soto (penalty scored); Manuel Earl (penalty scored); Flavio Maestri (penalty scored); Pablo Zegarra (penalty scored); Germán Pinillos (penalty missed); Orlando Prado (penalty missed)

== Promotion/relegation play-off ==
The promotion/relegation play-off was a two-legged series played by the team placing 14th in the 1993 Primera División, Defensor Lima and the 1993 Copa Perú runner-up Aurora.

23 January 1994	Defensor Lima	3–3 (a.e.t.) (7–6 p)	Aurora	Estadio Nacional, Lima
15:30	Alexis Ubillús 34'; Manuel Dávila 55'; Luis Mexo 111'		Edgar Abarca; Wilfredo Begazo 29'; Manuel Vinces 96' (o.g.)	Attendance: 5,579; Referee: Antonio Arnao
	Penalties
	Manuel Dávila (penalty scored); Alfredo Carmona (penalty scored); Luis Mexo (penalty missed); Sandro Cavero (penalty missed); Ramón Perleche (penalty scored); José Cajat (penalty scored); Luis García (penalty scored); Reynaldo Arzola (penalty scored); Manuel Vinces (penalty missed); Manuel Munayco (penalty scored)		Genaro Neyra (penalty missed); Edgar Abarca (penalty scored); Roberto Revilla (penalty scored); José Zegarra (penalty scored); Miguel Zevallos (penalty missed); Wilfredo Begazo (penalty scored); Mynor Jiménez (penalty scored); Ubaldo Puma (penalty scored); Renzo Ampuero (penalty missed); Gerardo Abarca (penalty missed)

Defensor Lima remains in the First Division.

== See also ==
- 1993 Torneo Intermedio
- 1993 Peruvian Segunda División
- 1993 Copa Perú
