= 1992 Peruvian Segunda División =

Peruvian Segunda División
- Season: 1992
- Champions: Unión Huaral
- Relegated: Internazionale; Sport Puerto Aéreo

The 1992 Peruvian Segunda División, the second division of Peruvian football (soccer), was played by 12 teams. the tournament winner, Unión Huaral was promoted to the Torneo Zonal's Final Group. The tournament was played on a home-and-away round-robin basis.

== Teams ==
=== Team changes ===
Relegated from 1991 Primera División	Promoted from 1991 Liga Provincial de Lima	Promoted from 1991 Región IV	Relegated to 1992 Copa Perú	
▼ Unión Huaral (9th) ▼ Internazionale (10th) ▼AELU (11th) ▼ Octavio Espinosa (12th)	▲ Alcides Vigo (1st)	▲ Sport Puerto Aéreo (1st)	▼ Juventud La Palma (7th) ▼ Juan Mata (8th) ▼ Walter Ormeño (9th) ▼ Sport Los Dinámicos (10th) ▼ Lawn Tennis (11th) ▼ Mercado Mayorista (12th)	▼ Aurora Cantolao (13th) ▼ Juventud Progreso (14th) ▼ Real Olímpico (15th) ▼ENAPU (16th) ▼ Cosmos 2000 (17th) ▼ Independiente (Retired)

=== Stadia and Locations ===
Team	City
AELU	Pueblo Libre, Lima
Alcides Vigo	Barranco, Lima
Bella Esperanza	Cerro Azul, Lima
Defensor Kiwi–Ciclista Lima	Lima
Deportivo Zúñiga	La Molina, Lima
Enrique Lau Chun	La Molina, Lima
Guardia Republicana	La Molina, Lima
Internazionale	San Borja, Lima
Metor–Lawn Tennis	Lima
Octavio Espinosa	Ica
Sport Puerto Aéreo	La Tinguiña, Ica
Unión Huaral	Huaral

== League table ==
=== Standings ===
Pos	Team	Pld	W	D	L	GF	GA	GD	Pts	Qualification or relegation
1	Unión Huaral (C)	22	14	8	0	43	13	+30	36	Torneo Zonal - Final Group
2	Defensor Kiwi–Ciclista Lima	22	14	6	2	42	15	+27	34	
3	Guardia Republicana	22	11	8	3	28	13	+15	30	
4	Deportivo Zúñiga	22	12	3	7	27	18	+9	27	
5	Bella Esperanza	22	9	8	5	30	19	+11	26	
6	AELU	22	8	7	7	31	26	+5	23	
7	Enrique Lau Chun	22	8	6	8	28	26	+2	22	
8	Meteor–Lawn Tennis	22	7	8	7	27	27	0	22	
9	Alcides Vigo	22	7	6	9	28	36	−8	20	
10	Octavio Espinosa	22	6	2	14	21	40	−19	14	
11	Sport Puerto Aéreo (R)	22	2	6	14	19	47	−28	10	1993 Copa Perú
12	Internazionale (R)	22	0	0	22	0	44	−44	0	1993 Copa Perú

(C) Champions; (R) Relegated

== See also ==
- 1992 Torneo Descentralizado
- 1992 Torneo Zonal
