= Mariano Santos de Tingo María =

Mariano Santos
- Full name: Club Deportivo Mariano Santos Mateo
- Founded: 11 April 1987; 38 years ago
- Ground: Estadio IPD de Tingo María, Tingo María
- League: Copa Perú
Home colours	Away colours

Club Deportivo Mariano Santos Mateo (sometimes referred as Mariano Santos) is a Peruvian football club, playing in the city of Tingo María, Huánuco, Peru.

== History ==
The Club Deportivo Mariano Santos was founded on 11 April 1987.

In 1993 Copa Perú, the club qualified to the Final Stage, but was eliminated when it finished in 3rd place.

In 2015 Copa Perú, the club qualified to the National Stage, but was eliminated when it finished in 46th place.

In 2016 Copa Perú, the club qualified to the National Stage, but was eliminated when it finished in 38th place.

== Honours ==
=== Regional ===
- Liga Departamental de Huánuco:

Winners (4): 1991, 1992, 2015, 2016

- Liga Provincial de Leoncio Prado:

Winners (1): 2015
Runner-up (1): 2016

- Liga Distrital de Rupa Rupa:

Winners (1): 2015

== See also ==
- List of football clubs in Peru
- Peruvian football league system
