= Orlando Prado =

Peruvian footballer (born 1972)

Personal information
- Date of birth: 16 February 1972 (age 54)
- Place of birth: Callao, Peru

International career
Years	Team	Apps	(Gls)
1997	Peru	5	(0)

Orlando Prado (born 16 February 1972) is a Peruvian footballer. He played in five matches for the Peru national football team in 1997. He was also part of Peru's squad for the 1997 Copa América tournament.
