= Deportivo Morba =

Morba
- Full name: Club Deportivo Morba FBC
- Ground: Mansiche, Trujillo, Peru
- Chairman: Segundo Moreno Bautista
- League: Copa Perú
Home colours

Morba was a Peru football club, located in the city of La Esperanza, Trujillo, La Libertad. The club was founded with the name of Club Deportivo Morba FBC in honor of the founder Segundo Moreno Bautista.

== History ==
The club have played at the highest level of Peruvian football on two occasions, from 1990 Torneo Descentralizado to 1991 Torneo Descentralizado when the club was relegated.

In the 1992 Torneo Zonal, the club couldn't qualify to the Final Group and was relegated to the 1993 Copa Perú.

== Honours ==
=== Regional ===
- Liga Departamental de La Libertad: 1

Winners (1): 1990

== See also ==
- List of football clubs in Peru
- Peruvian football league system
