= Deportivo Pacífico =

- Full name: Club Social Deportivo Pacífico
- Nickname: El Ventarrón de Norte
- Founded: 6 July 1945
- Ground: Estadio 24 de Julio, Zarumilla
- League: Copa Perú
Home colours

Deportivo Pacífico is a Peruvian football club, from the city of Tumbes.

The club was founded on July 6, 1945, and plays in the Copa Perú, which is the third division of the Peruvian league.

== History ==
The Zarumilla-based club is the only team from the Tumbes Department to have competed in the Peruvian Primera División, having participated in the Torneos Regionales as a member of the Northern Zone.

Managed by Víctor Zegarra, Pacífico defeated UTC 2–1 in a playoff during the first Regional Tournament of the 1990 Torneo Descentralizado, securing qualification for the pre-liguilla as the Northern Zone representative. In the next stage, the club faced Sport Boys, drawing 0–0 in the first leg at the Alejandro Villanueva Stadium. The Asociación Deportiva de Fútbol Profesional (ADFP) scheduled the second leg at the Miguel Grau Stadium in Piura, despite objections from Pacífico's board, which requested that the match be played at the Mariscal Cáceres Stadium in Tumbes. The club ultimately failed to appear for the fixture, and the Peruvian Football Federation's Justice Commission awarded the match to Sport Boys.

In the 1991 Torneo Descentralizado, Deportivo Pacífico failed to qualify for the pre-liguillas after finishing level on points with Carlos A. Mannucci in third place in the Northern Zone cumulative standings. As part of the reduction in the number of Primera División clubs for the 1992 season, both teams contested a playoff for the final berth in the 1992 Torneo Descentralizado. The match, played at the National Stadium in Lima, ended in a 3–0 victory for Mannucci. The following year, Deportivo Pacífico competed in the 1992 Peruvian Torneo Zonal but failed to qualify for the final liguilla, resulting in the club's return to the Copa Perú.

== Honours ==
=== Senior titles ===
Keys

- Record
- ^{(s)} Shared record

Type	Competition	Titles	Runner-up	Winning years	Runner-up years
Half-year / Short tournament (League)	Torneo Zona Norte	1	1	1990–I	1991–I
Regional (League)	Liga Departamental de Tumbes	2	1	1988, 2026	1987
Regional (League)	Liga Superior de Tumbes	—	1	—	2010
Regional (League)	Liga Provincial de Zarumilla	2	1	1987, 1988	2026
Regional (League)	Liga Distrital de Zarumilla	2	3	1987, 1988	1997, 2019, 2026

== See also ==
- List of football clubs in Peru
- Peruvian football league system
