= 1991 Torneo Descentralizado =

Torneo Descentralizado
- Season: 1991
- Dates: 24 March 1991 – 22 December 1991
- Champions: Sporting Cristal; 10th Primera División title
- Runner up: Sport Boys
- Relegated: AELU; Alfonso Ugarte; Alianza Huánuco; ADT; Atlético Grau; Atlético Torino; Aurora; Coronel Bolognesi; Deportivo Bancos; Deportivo Cañaña; Deportivo Comercio; Deportivo Hospital; Deportivo Pacífico; Diablos Rojos; Internazionale; Juan Aurich; Juvenil Los Ángeles; Libertad; Mariscal Nieto; Mina San Vicente; Morba; Octavio Espinoza; Unión Huayllaspanca; Unión Huaral; Unión Tarapoto
- Copa Libertadores: Sporting Cristal; Sport Boys
- Copa CONMEBOL: Universitario
- Top goalscorer: Horacio Baldessari (25 goals)

The 1991 Torneo Descentralizado, the top tournament of Peruvian football, was played by 41 teams in the format of Regional Tournaments, whose winner advanced to national finals.

Sporting Cristal was automatically crowned national champion after winning both the Torneo Regional I and the Torneo Regional II. Managed by Juan Carlos Oblitas, the Lima-based club secured the 10th league title in its history, marking the beginning of one of the most successful and glorious eras in the club's history.

== Teams ==
=== Team changes ===
Promoted from 1990 Segunda División	Promoted from 1990 Ligas Regionales	Relegated from 1990 Primera División
▲ Hijos de Yurimaguas (1st)	▲ Juan Aurich (Región Norte - 1st) ▲ Alianza Huánuco (Región Centro - 1st) ▲ Deportivo Comercio (Región Oriente - 1st) ▲ Mariscal Nieto (Región Sur - 1st)	▼ Meteor Sport (Zona Metropolitana- 12th) ▼15 de Septiembre (Zona Norte - 10th) ▼ Deportivo Junín (Zona Centro - 6th) ▼ Defensor ANDA (Zona Centro - 7th) ▼ Alipio Ponce (Zona Centro - 8th) ▼ Atlético Belén (Zona Oriente - 5th) ▼ Chacarita Versalles (Zona Oriente - 6th) ▼ Atlético Huracán (Zona Sur - 8th)

=== Stadia locations ===
Locations of the 1991 Primera División teams

Team	City	Stadium	Capacity
ADT	Tarma	Unión Tarma	9,000
AELU	Pueblo Libre, Lima	Nacional	45,750
Alfonso Ugarte	Puno	Enrique Torres Belón	20,000
Alianza Atlético	Sullana	Campeones del 36	12,000
Alianza Huánuco	Huánuco	Heraclio Tapia	15,000
Alianza Lima	La Victoria, Lima	Alejandro Villanueva	35,000
Atlético Grau	Piura	Miguel Grau (Piura)	25,000
Atlético Torino	Talara	Campeonísimo	8,000
Aurora	Arequipa	Mariano Melgar	20,000
Carlos A. Mannucci	Trujillo	Mansiche	24,000
Cienciano	Cusco	Garcilaso	42,056
CNI	Iquitos	Max Augustín	24,000
Coronel Bolognesi	Tacna	Jorge Basadre	19,850
Defensor Lima	Breña, Lima	Nacional	45,750
Deportivo Bancos	Pucallpa	Aliardo Soria	15,000
Deportivo Cañaña	Chiclayo	Elías Aguirre	24,500
Deportivo Comercio	Moyobamba	IPD de Moyobamba	8,000
Deportivo Hospital	Pucallpa	Aliardo Soria	15,000
Deportivo Municipal	Cercado de Lima	Nacional	45,750
Deportivo Morba	Trujillo	Mansiche	24,000
Deportivo Pacífico	Zarumilla	24 de Julio	5,000
Diablos Rojos	Juliaca	Guillermo Briceño Rosamedina	20,030
Hijos de Yurimaguas	Ventanilla	Miguel Grau	17,000
Internazionale	San Borja, Lima	Nacional	45,750
Juan Aurich	Chiclayo	Elías Aguirre	24,500
Juvenil Los Ángeles	Moquegua	Héroes de Estuquiña	10,000
León de Huánuco	Huánuco	Heraclio Tapia	15,000
Libertad	Trujillo	Mansiche	24,000
Mariscal Nieto	Ilo	Mariscal Nieto	8,000
Melgar	Arequipa	Mariano Melgar	20,000
Mina San Vicente	Junín, Peru	Municipal de San Ramón	10,000
Octavio Espinosa	Ica	José Picasso Peratta	8,000
San Agustín	San Isidro, Lima	Nacional	45,750
Sport Boys	Callao	Miguel Grau	17,000
Sporting Cristal	Rímac, Lima	Nacional	45,750
Unión Huaral	Huaral	Julio Lores Colan	10,000
Unión Huayllaspanca	Huancayo	Huancayo	20,000
Unión Minas	Cerro de Pasco	Daniel Alcides Carrión	8,000
Unión Tarapoto	Tarapoto	Carlos Vidaurre García	7,000
UTC	Cajamarca	Héroes de San Ramón	18,000
Universitario	Breña, Lima	Teodoro Lolo Fernández	15,000

== Torneo Regional I ==
=== Zona Metropolitana ===
Pos	Team	Pld	W	D	L	GF	GA	GD	Pts	Qualification or relegation	CRI	SBA	ALI	UNI	DLI	MUN	HUA	AGU	HIJ	INT	AEL	OCT
1	Sporting Cristal	11	6	4	1	21	8	+13	16	Octogonal		4–2	1–1					4–0		1–0	1–1	2–0
2	Sport Boys	11	5	5	1	22	13	+9	15	Octogonal				1–1	0–0	3–0	2–1				4–1	
3	Alianza Lima	11	5	5	1	15	8	+7	15	Octogonal		1–1		0–0						2–1		4–0
4	Universitario	11	4	6	1	13	8	+5	14	Octogonal	1–2					2–1		0–0	2–1		0–0	
5	Defensor Lima	11	4	6	1	14	11	+3	14		3–2		1–1	1–1		1–1			2–2	2–1		
6	Deportivo Municipal	11	5	2	4	11	11	0	12		1–1		1–0				1–0			1–0	2–0	
7	Unión Huaral	11	2	5	4	6	8	−2	9		0–0		0–1	0–0	0–1				0–0			
8	San Agustín	11	2	5	4	10	15	−5	9			2–4	2–2		1–1	1–0	1–2		2–0			1–1
9	Hijos de Yurimaguas	11	2	4	5	12	19	−7	8		0–4	1–1	1–2			3–2						2–2
10	Internazionale	11	2	3	6	9	13	−4	7			1–1		2–3			0–1	0–0	1–0			2–1
11	AELU	11	1	5	5	7	14	−7	7				0–1		1–2		2–2	1–0	0–1	1–1		
12	Octavio Espinosa	11	1	4	6	7	19	−12	6			1–3		0–3	1–0	0–1	0–0				1–1	

Source: Diario El Comercio 1991
Legend: Blue = home team win; Yellow = draw; Red = away team win.

*Note: The championship was suspended after 9 games until mid-July. One player Hector Mathei (Deportivo Municipal) was killed and seven other players injured in a bomb attack on a club dressing room (Deportivo Municipal vs Alianza Lima).

=== Zona Norte ===
Pos	Team	Pld	W	D	L	GF	GA	GD	Pts	Qualification or relegation	CAM	PAC	UTC	TOR	AAS	MOR	JAU	GRA	CAÑ	LIB
1	Carlos A. Mannucci	18	12	3	3	23	10	+13	27	Octogonal		3–0	1–0	0–0	1–0	3–0	1–0	2–1	3–1	1–0
2	Deportivo Pacífico	18	9	4	5	22	19	+3	22		1–0		1–0	2–2	1–1	1–1	1–0	2–1	1–0	2–0
3	UTC	18	9	3	6	23	16	+7	21		2–0	2–0		0–1	4–1	2–0	3–1	2–1	1–1	2–1
4	Atlético Torino	18	7	7	4	20	15	+5	21		0–1	–	1–0		1–1	2–2	1–0	1–1	1–0	4–1
5	Alianza Atlético	18	7	5	6	24	21	+3	19		3–2	2–1	0–1	0–0		0–1	2–0	1–1	2–0	3–0
6	Morba	18	6	6	6	16	18	−2	18		1–1	1–2	2–1	0–0	1–2		1–1	–	–	2–0
7	Juan Aurich	18	7	3	8	19	17	+2	17		0–1	2–3	3–0	3–1	1–1	3–0		2–1	0–0	1–0
8	Atlético Grau	18	5	6	7	19	8	+11	16		0–0	1–2	0–0	2–1	1–3	1–0	–		1–0	5–1
9	Deportivo Cañaña	18	4	4	10	12	20	−8	12		0–1	–	0–0	1–0	2–1	1–3	–	0–2		2–2
10	Libertad	18	2	3	13	14	35	−21	7		1–2	1–1	1–3	2–3	3–1	–	–	0–0	2–1	

Source: Diario El Comercio 1991
Legend: Blue = home team win; Yellow = draw; Red = away team win.

=== Zona Sur ===
Pos	Team	Pld	W	D	L	GF	GA	GD	Pts	Qualification or relegation	MEL	CIE	AUR	JLÁ	MNI	ALF	DRJ	COR
1	Melgar	13	9	4	0	24	25	−1	22	Octogonal		3–2	1–0	–	3–0	3–1	1–1	5–0
2	Cienciano	13	7	3	3	21	8	+13	17		0–1		3–1	1–0	2–0	5–0	3–0	2–0
3	Aurora	12	7	2	3	28	11	+17	16		1–2	2–2		4–1	2–0	4–1	5–0	4–0
4	Juvenil Los Ángeles	11	4	2	5	9	16	−7	10		1–1	1–0	0–0		–	–	1–0	2–1
5	Mariscal Nieto	11	3	3	5	12	13	−1	9		0–0	0–0	–	4–0		–	5–1	1–0
6	Alfonso Ugarte	11	4	1	6	13	20	−7	9		0–3	0–0	–	2–1	2–1		2–1	5–0
7	Diablos Rojos	13	3	2	8	9	22	−13	8		0–0	0–1	0–2	2–0	3–1	1–0		–
8	Coronel Bolognesi	12	2	1	9	5	8	−3	5		0–1	–	1–3	1–2	0–0	1–0	1–0	

Source: Diario El Comercio 1991
Legend: Blue = home team win; Yellow = draw; Red = away team win.

=== Zona Centro ===
Pos	Team	Pld	W	D	L	GF	GA	GD	Pts	Qualification or relegation	HUA	LEO	UMI	ADT	ALI	MSV
1	Unión Huayllaspanca	7	5	1	1	12	3	+9	11	Octogonal		2–0	2–1	–	3–0	–
2	León de Huánuco	9	6	1	2	10	3	+7	13		1–0		2–0	2–0	1–0	3–0
3	Unión Minas	8	6	0	2	11	5	+6	12		–	1–0		3–1	1–0	3–0
4	ADT	9	2	3	4	10	9	+1	7		0–0	0–0	0–1		3–1	5–0
5	Alianza Huánuco	8	2	0	6	5	12	−7	4		1–2	0–1	–	1–0		–
6	Mina San Vicente	7	0	1	6	2	18	−16	1		0–3	–	0–1	1–1	1–2	

Source: Diario El Comercio 1991
Legend: Blue = home team win; Yellow = draw; Red = away team win.

==== Tiebreaker ====
11 July 1991	Unión Huayllaspanca	2–1	León de Huánuco	Estadio Nacional, Lima
15:00	Percy Franco 31'; José Reyna 72'		Humberto Miranda 5'	Referee: Fernando Chappell

=== Zona Oriente ===
==== Primera Liguilla ====
Pos	Team	Pld	W	D	L	GF	GA	GD	Pts	Qualification or relegation	BAN	TAR	CNI	COM	HOS
1	Deportivo Bancos	3	3	0	0	7	2	+5	6	Octogonal			1–0		4–2
2	Unión Tarapoto	2	1	1	0	3	1	+2	3		–				2–0
3	CNI	2	1	0	1	3	1	+2	2			–		3–0	
4	Deportivo Comercio	3	0	1	2	1	6	−5	1		0–2	1–1			
5	Deportivo Hospital	2	0	0	2	2	6	−4	0				–	–	

Source: Diario El Comercio 1991
Legend: Blue = home team win; Yellow = draw; Red = away team win.

==== Segunda Liguilla ====
- Deportivo Hospital withdrew midway through the championship, relegating to the Copa Perú.

Pos	Team	Pld	W	D	L	GF	GA	GD	Pts	Qualification or relegation	CNI	TAR	BAN	COM	HOS
1	CNI	4	3	1	0	10	5	+5	7	Octogonal		1–1		6–2	
2	Unión Tarapoto	3	2	1	0	3	2	+1	5				–	2–1	
3	Deportivo Bancos	3	2	0	1	6	3	+3	4		2–3				W.O.
4	Deportivo Comercio	4	1	0	3	3	12	−9	2				0–4		W.O.
5	Deportivo Hospital	4	0	0	4	0	0	0	0	Retired	W.O.	W.O.			

Source: Diario El Comercio 1991
Legend: Blue = home team win; Yellow = draw; Red = away team win.

=== Octogonal ===
Team 1	Agg.	Team 2	1st leg	2nd leg
Sporting Cristal	4–1	Carlos A. Mannucci	2–1	2–0
Melgar	5–3	Alianza Lima	3–0	2–3
Sport Boys	7–2	CNI	4–1	3–1
Unión Huayllaspanca	0–4	Universitario	0–0	0–4

==== First leg ====
4 August 1991	Sport Boys	4–1	CNI	Estadio Nacional, Lima
	José Muñoz 14'; Marquinho 51'; Ramón Anchisi 70'; Germán Carty 81'		Marcio Ruiz 61'	Referee: Luis Seminario

4 August 1991	Sporting Cristal	2–1	Carlos A. Mannucci	Estadio Nacional, Lima
	Horacio Baldessari 30' 37'		José Ramírez Puga 44'	Attendance: 7,632; Referee: Carlos Hernández

4 August 1991	Melgar	3–0	Alianza Lima	Estadio Mariano Melgar, Arequipa
15:30	Wilmet Calmet 13'; Raúl Moreno 38'; Pedro Valdivia 78'			Attendance: 9,694; Referee: Leo Ramírez

4 August 1991	Unión Huayllaspanca	0–0	Universitario	Estadio IV Centenario, Huancayo
				Attendance: 6,967; Referee: Carlos Mansilla

==== Second leg ====
11 August 1991	Carlos A. Mannucci	0–2	Sporting Cristal	Estadio Mansiche, Trujillo
			Franco Navarro 47'; Julio César Antón 89'	Attendance: 11,770; Referee: Alberto Tejada

11 August 1991	Alianza Lima	3–2	Melgar	Estadio Nacional, Lima
15:30	Ricardo Cano 12'; Jorge Cordero 19'; Víctor Reyes 29'		Wilson Ramírez 61'; Luis Falcón 87'	Attendance: 14,739; Referee: Fernando Chappell

11 August 1991	CNI	1–3	Sport Boys	Estadio Max Augustín, Iquitos
	Ricardo Vinatea 88'		Germán Carty 30'; Carlos Henrique Paris 57'; Ramón Anchisi 69'	Attendance: 3,000; Referee: Sergio Leiblinger

11 August 1991	Universitario	4–0	Unión Huayllaspanca	Estadio Teodoro Lolo Fernández, Lima
	Jesús Torrealva 4'; Andrés Gonzáles 35'; Álvaro Barco 43'; Alfonso Yáñez 89'			Attendance: 4,885; Referee: José Ramírez

Melgar, Sport Boys, Sporting Cristal and Universitario qualified for the Liguilla Final.

=== Liguilla Final ===
==== Standings ====
Pos	Team	Pld	W	D	L	GF	GA	GD	Pts	Qualification or relegation	CRI	SBA	UNI	MEL
1	Sporting Cristal	3	1	2	0	2	1	+1	4	1992 Copa Libertadores		0–0	1–0	
2	Sport Boys	3	1	2	0	4	1	+3	4	Second place play-off				3–0
3	Universitario	3	0	2	1	2	3	−1	2			1–1		1–1
4	Melgar	3	0	2	1	2	5	−3	2		1–1			

Legend: Blue = home team win; Yellow = draw; Red = away team win.

==== Results ====
18 August 1991	Sport Boys	3–0	Melgar	Estadio Nacional, Lima
13:30	Pedro Olivares 48'; Ramón Anchisi 62' 77'			Referee: César Cachay

18 August 1991	Sporting Cristal	1–0	Universitario	Estadio Nacional, Lima
15:30	Franco Navarro 39'			Attendance: 25,916; Referee: Carlos Mansilla

21 August 1991	Melgar	1–1	Sporting Cristal	Estadio Nacional, Lima
18:00	Luis Flores 90'		Franco Navarro 82'	Referee: Sergio Leiblinger

21 August 1991	Universitario	1–1	Sport Boys	Estadio Nacional, Lima
20:00	Oswaldo Araujo 56'		Pedro Requena 30' (o.g.)	Attendance: 18,340; Referee: José Ramírez

25 August 1991	Universitario	1–1	Melgar	Estadio Nacional, Lima
13:30	Álvaro Barco 90'		Eder 84'	Referee: Antonio Arnao

25 August 1991	Sporting Cristal	0–0	Sport Boys	Estadio Nacional, Lima
15:30				Attendance: 16,313; Referee: Alberto Tejada

===== Tiebreaker =====
28 August 1991	Sporting Cristal	1–0	Sport Boys	Estadio Nacional, Lima
19:00	Julio César Antón 55'			Attendance: 14,634; Referee: Fernando Chappell

== Torneo Regional II ==
=== Zona Metropolitana ===
Pos	Team	Pld	W	D	L	GF	GA	GD	Pts	Qualification or relegation	UNI	SBA	CRI	DLI	ALI	AGU	MUN	HIJ	HUA	AEL	INT	OCT
1	Universitario	22	12	8	2	37	18	+19	32	Octogonal		1–1	1–1	1–1	1–0	1–1	1–0	1–2	3–2	1–0	5–0	1–0
2	Sport Boys	22	10	10	2	30	18	+12	30	Octogonal	1–1		1–1	1–0	1–1	1–0	2–1	1–0	1–1	3–0	2–1	4–1
3	Sporting Cristal	22	11	6	5	42	26	+16	28	Octogonal	0–2	1–1		2–1	0–3	1–0	5–1	0–0	4–0	1–0	0–0	5–1
4	Defensor Lima	22	12	4	6	35	27	+8	28	Octogonal	2–2	3–0	3–1		0–2	1–0	2–1	2–1	2–0	1–3	2–1	1–0
5	Alianza Lima	22	8	10	4	34	23	+11	26		0–0	1–1	2–3	0–1		0–0	1–1	1–3	3–1	2–0	4–1	1–1
6	San Agustín	22	9	6	7	27	19	+8	24		0–1	0–0	3–2	0–0	0–1		1–0	3–0	1–1	4–0	3–2	3–0
7	Deportivo Municipal	22	9	6	7	30	27	+3	24		0–3	2–1	1–2	2–1	1–1	3–2		2–1	1–1	4–1	0–0	2–1
8	Hijos de Yurimaguas	22	8	7	7	30	26	+4	23		2–1	0–0	3–1	4–1	2–4	1–2	0–0		1–0	1–1	2–1	4–1
9	Unión Huaral	22	5	10	7	26	32	−6	20		1–1	1–2	2–2	2–3	3–3	2–1	0–0	1–1		2–0	0–0	2–1
10	AELU	22	4	3	15	20	45	−25	11		2–4	0–2	0–5	0–0	1–2	2–3	1–5	0–0	1–2		0–1	2–0
11	Internazionale	22	1	8	13	16	39	−23	10		2–4	1–1	0–3	2–3	1–1	0–0	0–2	1–1	0–0	2–3		0–2
12	Octavio Espinosa	22	3	2	17	17	45	−28	8		0–1	1–3	1–2	2–5	1–1	0–1	0–1	2–1	1–2	0–3	1–0	

Legend: Blue = home team win; Yellow = draw; Red = away team win.

=== Zona Norte ===
Pos	Team	Pld	W	D	L	GF	GA	GD	Pts	Qualification or relegation	AAS	GRA	UTC	PAC	TOR	CAM	CAÑ	JAU	MOR	LIB
1	Alianza Atlético	18	12	5	1	34	9	+25	29	Octogonal		2–1	3–1	1–0	1–1	2–0	1–0	2–0	5–1	5–0
2	Atlético Grau	18	11	4	3	30	20	+10	26		1–1		3–1	2–1	–	1–0	1–0	1–0	–	1–0
3	UTC	18	9	4	5	32	23	+9	22		1–1	–		3–1	1–0	–	2–0	–	1–1	1–1
4	Deportivo Pacífico	18	9	3	6	35	24	+11	21		–	1–0	3–0		2–2	4–1	1–0	–	4–3	5–1
5	Atlético Torino	18	8	5	5	24	19	+5	21		0–0	2–3	1–1	2–1		1–0	2–0	0–0	–	3–0
6	Carlos A. Mannucci	18	6	4	8	31	28	+3	16		0–2	2–2	4–2	3–2	0–2		1–1	4–1	3–0	–
7	Deportivo Cañaña	18	5	5	8	21	21	0	15		0–0	1–1	1–0	3–3	–	0–0		–	2–1	1–2
8	Juan Aurich	18	4	5	9	12	27	−15	13		1–2	1–1	0–3	1–0	1–2	1–1	1–0		2–0	1–0
9	Morba	18	4	3	11	23	35	−12	11		0–1	0–3	0–1	–	2–0	3–2	3–2	1–1		0–0
10	Libertad	18	1	4	13	9	45	−36	6		–	1–3	0–1	0–0	1–2	0–4	0–5	0–0	–	

Legend: Blue = home team win; Yellow = draw; Red = away team win.

=== Zona Sur ===
Pos	Team	Pld	W	D	L	GF	GA	GD	Pts	Qualification or relegation	MEL	CIE	AUR	DRJ	ALF	MNI	JLÁ	COR
1	Melgar	14	13	0	1	23	7	+16	26	Octogonal		1–0	2–1	4–0	2–0	1–0	1–0	–
2	Cienciano	14	9	2	3	27	11	+16	20		4–1		1–0	3–0	3–0	3–0	4–0	4–0
3	Aurora	14	7	4	3	16	9	+7	18		0–3	2–0		0–0	3–0	3–1	1–0	2–0
4	Diablos Rojos	14	6	3	5	19	15	+4	15		0–1	4–2	–		2–0	2–1	3–3	3–1
5	Alfonso Ugarte	14	4	3	7	10	20	−10	11		1–4	1–1	0–0	1–0		4–3	1–0	1–0
6	Mariscal Nieto	14	3	3	8	12	20	−8	9		2–3	–	0–2	3–0	2–0		1–1	1–0
7	Juvenil Los Ángeles	14	1	5	8	11	18	−7	7		0–1	0–1	1–1	1–1	–	0–0		0–1
8	Coronel Bolognesi	14	3	0	11	7	25	−18	6		0–2	1–3	0–1	1–3	2–0	2–1	1–4	

Legend: Blue = home team win; Yellow = draw; Red = away team win.

=== Zona Centro ===
Pos	Team	Pld	W	D	L	GF	GA	GD	Pts	Qualification or relegation	LEO	UMI	ADT	HUA	ALI	MSV
1	León de Huánuco	10	7	2	1	19	6	+13	16	Octogonal		0–0	2–1	2–0	2–0	1–0
2	Unión Minas	10	6	2	2	22	9	+13	14		2–1		3–0	3–1	5–0	4–0
3	ADT	10	6	1	3	10	9	+1	13		2–2	1–0		1–0	0–0	2–0
4	Unión Huayllaspanca	10	6	0	4	15	11	+4	12		1–3	3–0	1–0		3–0	2–1
5	Alianza Huánuco	10	1	1	8	7	20	−13	3		0–3	2–2	0–1	1–2		1–2
6	Mina San Vicente	10	1	0	9	7	25	−18	2		0–1	2–1	–	1–4	1–3	

Legend: Blue = home team win; Yellow = draw; Red = away team win.

* Note: Two players and an official of the Union Minas (Central zone of the decentralized championship), were injured and a member of the coaching staff was killed when the team's bus was shot at as the squad returned from an away match. Highway robbers or terrorists were thought to be responsible. The central-zone championship, which qualified the winner for The final round, was suspended as a result.

=== Zona Oriente ===
==== Primera Liguilla ====
Pos	Team	Pld	W	D	L	GF	GA	GD	Pts	Qualification or relegation	TAR	BAN	CNI	COM
1	Unión Tarapoto	3	3	0	0	6	1	+5	6	Regional Final		3–1	–	
2	Deportivo Bancos	3	2	0	1	8	3	+5	4					–
3	CNI	3	1	0	2	3	3	0	2			–		3–0
4	Deportivo Comercio	3	0	0	3	0	10	−10	0		–			

Legend: Blue = home team win; Yellow = draw; Red = away team win.

==== Segunda Liguilla ====
Pos	Team	Pld	W	D	L	GF	GA	GD	Pts	Qualification or relegation	BAN	CNI	TAR	COM
1	Deportivo Bancos	3	2	1	0	5	2	+3	5	Regional Final		0–0	3–2	2–0
2	CNI	3	2	1	0	6	1	+5	5				4–1	2–0
3	Unión Tarapoto	3	1	0	2	5	7	−2	2					2–0
4	Deportivo Comercio	3	0	0	3	0	6	−6	0					

Legend: Blue = home team win; Yellow = draw; Red = away team win.

===== Tiebreaker =====
23 October 1991	Deportivo Bancos	1–0	CNI	Estadio Aliardo Soria Pérez, Pucallpa
15:30	Bardales 24'

==== Regional Final ====
27 October 1991	Deportivo Bancos	2–1	Unión Tarapoto	Estadio Aliardo Soria Pérez, Pucallpa
15:30

3 November 1991	Unión Tarapoto	1–0 (4–5 p)	Deportivo Bancos	Estadio Municipal Carlos Vidaurre García, Tarapoto
15:00	Faro

Deportivo Bancos qualified for the play-off for a place in the Octogonal, where they faced CNI, the winners of the Regional I - Zona Oriente.

==== Octogonal Play-off ====
The match was contested between CNI, winners of the Oriente Zone of the Torneo Regional I, and Deportivo Bancos, winners of the Oriente Zone of the Torneo Regional II.

10 November 1991	Deportivo Bancos	1–0	CNI	Estadio Aliardo Soria Pérez, Pucallpa
15:30	Estrada 60'

13 November 1991	CNI	2–1	Deportivo Bancos	Estadio Max Augustín, Iquitos
19:30

16 November 1991 Extra match	CNI	4–1	Deportivo Bancos	Estadio Nacional, Lima
	Ricardo Rachumín 12'; Ricardo Vinatea 42' (pen.); Julio Vinatea 70' 83'		Julio Estrada 20'	Referee: Carlos Hernández

CNI qualified for the Octogonal and subsequently secured a place in the 1992 Torneo Descentralizado.

=== Octogonal ===
Team 1	Agg.	Team 2	1st leg	2nd leg
CNI	2–3	Defensor Lima	1–1	1–2
Sport Boys	1–1 (3–2 p)	León de Huánuco	1–0	0–1
Melgar	3–6	Sporting Cristal	3–1	0–5
Alianza Atlético	2–7	Universitario	1–3	1–4

==== First leg ====
24 November 1991	Melgar	3–1	Sporting Cristal	Estadio Mariano Melgar, Arequipa
11:30	Luis Falcón 11' 43'; Víctor Riega 80'		Julio César Antón 75'	Attendance: 11,200; Referee: Alberto Tejada

24 November 1991	CNI	1–1	Defensor Lima	Estadio Max Agustín, Iquitos
13:30	Ricardo Vinatea 30'		Ricardo Zegarra 37'	Referee: Sergio Leiblinger

24 November 1991	Alianza Atlético	1–3	Universitario	Estadio Miguel Grau, Piura
13:30	Ego Aguirre 90' (pen.)		Tomás Silva 38'; Roberto Martínez 42' (pen.) 80' (pen.)	Attendance: 10,000; Referee: Fernando Chappell

24 November 1991	Sport Boys	1–0	León de Huánuco	Estadio Teodoro Lolo Fernández, Lima
15:30	Ramón Perleche 61'			Attendance: 6,006; Referee: José Ramírez

==== Second leg ====
1 December 1991	Defensor Lima	2–1	CNI	Estadio Nacional, Lima
	Raúl Hurtado 49'; Fernando Revilla		Ricardo Vinatea (pen.)	Attendance: 362

1 December 1991	León de Huánuco	1–0 (2–3 p)	Sport Boys	Estadio Heraclio Tapia, Huánuco
	Humberto Miranda 1'			Referee: Sergio Leiblinger
	Penalties
	Juan Illescas (penalty missed); Jaime Jarama (penalty scored); Roger Serrano (penalty missed); César Rosales (penalty scored); Luis Farfán (penalty missed)		Marquinho (penalty scored); Jacinto Rodríguez (penalty scored); César Charún (penalty scored)

1 December 1991	Sporting Cristal	5–0	Melgar	Estadio Alejandro Villanueva, Lima
15:30	Pablo Zegarra 6' (pen.); Julio César Antón 55'; Flavio Maestri 61' 74'; Horacio Baldessari 64'			Attendance: 6,599; Referee: Fernando Chappell

1 December 1991	Universitario	4–1	Alianza Atlético	Estadio Teodoro Lolo Fernández, Lima
15:30	Alfonso Yáñez 8'; Tomás Silva 36' 71'; Alfredo Carmona 84'		Alberto Ramírez 9'	Attendance: 4,769; Referee: Alberto Tejada

Defensor Lima, Sport Boys, Sporting Cristal and Universitario qualified for the Liguilla Final.

=== Liguilla Final ===
==== Standings ====
Pos	Team	Pld	W	D	L	GF	GA	GD	Pts	Qualification or relegation	CRI	UNI	SBA	DEF
1	Sporting Cristal	3	2	0	1	5	3	+2	4	1992 Copa Libertadores			2–1	2–1
2	Universitario	3	1	2	0	4	3	+1	4	Second place play-off	1–0		1–1	
3	Sport Boys	3	1	1	1	3	3	0	3					2–0
4	Defensor Lima	3	0	1	2	3	6	−3	1			2–2		

Legend: Blue = home team win; Yellow = draw; Red = away team win.

==== Results ====
8 December 1991	Sport Boys	2–0	Defensor Lima	Estadio Nacional, Lima
14:00	Marco Charún 63'; Germán Carty 90'			Referee: Juan Carlos Hernández

8 December 1991	Universitario	1–0	Sporting Cristal	Estadio Nacional, Lima
16:00	Roberto Martínez 58'			Attendance: 32,157; Referee: Luis Seminario

11 December 1991	Sporting Cristal	2–1	Sport Boys	Estadio Nacional, Lima
18:00	Julio César Antón 75'; Horacio Baldessari 89'		Germán Carty 78'	Referee: Alberto Tejada

11 December 1991	Defensor Lima	2–2	Universitario	Estadio Nacional, Lima
20:00	Ricardo Zegarra 16' 67'		Roberto Martínez 12'; Pedro Requena 77'	Referee: José Arana

15 December 1991	Sporting Cristal	2–1	Defensor Lima	Estadio Nacional, Lima
16:00	Leonardo Rojas 16'; Pablo Zegarra 53'		Julinho 55'	Referee: Sergio Leiblinger

15 December 1991	Universitario	1–1	Sport Boys	Estadio Nacional, Lima
18:00	Roberto Martínez 24'		Martín Duffó 87'	Attendance: 23,100; Referee: José Ramírez

===== Tiebreaker =====
18 December 1991	Sporting Cristal	1–1 (7–6 p)	Universitario	Estadio Nacional, Lima
20:00	Pablo Zegarra 30'		Óscar Calvo 63' (pen.)	Referee: Fernando Chapell
	Penalties
	Pablo Zegarra (penalty scored); Pedro Novella (penalty missed); Orlando Prado (penalty scored); Pedro Olivares (penalty scored); Horacio Baldessari (penalty scored); Roberto Palacios (penalty missed); Jorge Arteaga (penalty missed); Claudio Pedraglio (penalty scored); Julio César Antón (penalty scored); Pedro Rojas (penalty scored)		Roberto Martínez (penalty scored); Jesús Torrealva (penalty scored); Freddy Torrealva (penalty missed); Octavio Vidales (penalty scored); Tomás Silva (penalty scored); Pedro Requena (penalty missed); Gabriel Kanashiro (penalty missed); Juan Carlos Bazalar (penalty scored); Andrés Gonzales (penalty scored); Carlos Cáceda (penalty missed)

== Second place play-off ==
Since Sporting Cristal won both the Regional I and Regional II tournaments, they were crowned league champions without the need to play a title playoff. Instead, a runner-up playoff match had to be contested between the second-place teams from Regional I and Regional II to determine the qualifier for the 1992 Copa Libertadores.

22 December 1991
20:00

Sport Boys	3–3	Universitario
Germán Carty 12'; Carlos Henrique Paris 39'; Marquinho 80' (pen.)		Alfonso Yáñez 19'; Roberto Martínez 45'; Andrés Gonzales 48'
Penalties
Ramón Perleche (penalty scored); Jacinto Rodríguez (penalty scored); Pedro Olivares (penalty scored); Marqhino (penalty scored)	4–1	Roberto Martínez (penalty scored); Jesús Torrealva (penalty missed); Andrés González (penalty missed)

Estadio Nacional, Lima
Attendance: 22,879
Referee: Alberto Tejada

== Aggregate tables (Regional I and Regional II) ==
=== Zona Metropolitana ===
Pos	Team	Pld	W	D	L	Pts	Qualification or relegation
1	Sport Boys	33	15	15	3	45	1992 Copa Libertadores
2	Sporting Cristal (C)	33	17	10	6	44	1992 Copa Libertadores
3	Universitario	33	16	14	3	46	
4	Defensor Lima	33	16	10	7	42	
5	Alianza Lima	33	13	15	5	41	
6	Deportivo Municipal	33	14	8	11	36	
7	San Agustín	33	11	11	11	33	
8	Hijos de Yurimaguas	33	10	11	12	31	
9	Unión Huaral (R)	33	7	15	11	29	1992 Segunda División
10	AELU (R)	33	5	8	20	18	1992 Segunda División
11	Internazionale (R)	33	3	11	19	17	1992 Segunda División
12	Octavio Espinosa (R)	33	4	6	23	14	1992 Segunda División

(C) Champions; (R) Relegated

=== Zona Norte ===
Pos	Team	Pld	W	D	L	Pts	Qualification or relegation
1	Alianza Atlético	36	19	10	7	48	
2	UTC	36	18	7	11	43	
3	Carlos A. Mannucci (O, A)	36	18	7	11	43	Relegation Play-off
4	Deportivo Pacífico (A)	36	18	7	11	43	Relegation Play-off
5	Atlético Grau (R)	36	16	10	10	42	1992 Torneo Zonal
6	Atlético Torino (R)	36	15	12	9	42	1992 Torneo Zonal
7	Juan Aurich (R)	36	11	8	17	30	1992 Torneo Zonal
8	Morba (R)	36	10	9	17	29	1992 Torneo Zonal
9	Deportivo Cañaña (R)	36	9	9	18	27	1992 Torneo Zonal
10	Libertad (R)	36	3	7	26	13	1992 Torneo Zonal

(A) Advance to a further round; (O) Play-off winners; (R) Relegated

==== Relegation Play-off ====
16 November 1991
16:00

Carlos A. Mannucci	3–0	Deportivo Pacífico
Juan Caballero 69'

Estadio Nacional, Lima

=== Región Sur ===
Pos	Team	Pld	W	D	L	Pts	Qualification or relegation
1	Melgar	14	13	0	1	26	
2	Cienciano	14	9	2	3	20	
3	Aurora (A)	14	7	4	3	18	Relegation Play-off
4	Diablos Rojos (R)	14	6	3	5	15	1992 Torneo Zonal
5	Alfonso Ugarte (R)	14	4	3	7	11	1992 Torneo Zonal
6	Mariscal Nieto (R)	14	3	3	8	9	1992 Torneo Zonal
7	Juvenil Los Ángeles (R)	14	1	5	8	7	1992 Torneo Zonal
8	Coronel Bolognesi (R)	14	3	0	11	6	1992 Torneo Zonal

(A) Advance to a further round; (R) Relegated

=== Zona Centro ===
Pos	Team	Pld	W	D	L	Pts	Qualification or relegation
1	León de Huánuco	10	7	2	1	16	
2	Unión Minas (O, A)	10	6	2	2	14	Relegation Play-off
3	Unión Huayllaspanca (R)	10	6	0	4	12	1992 Torneo Zonal
4	ADT (R)	10	6	1	3	13	1992 Torneo Zonal
5	Alianza Huánuco (R)	10	1	1	8	3	1992 Torneo Zonal
6	Mina San Vicente (R)	10	1	0	9	2	1992 Torneo Zonal

(A) Advance to a further round; (O) Play-off winners; (R) Relegated

==== Relegation Play-off (3rd South Zone / 2nd Center Zone) ====
30 November 1991
15:30

Unión Minas	1–1	Aurora
José Siguas 45'		Jorge Tapia 32'
Penalties
Rafael Cánepa (penalty scored); Pablo Camargo (penalty scored); Duilio Poggi (penalty scored); Carlos Cuya (penalty scored)	4–2	Marco Álvarez (penalty scored); Martín Gago (penalty scored); Genaro Neyra (penalty missed); Walter Bejarano (penalty missed)

Estadio Nacional, Lima
Attendance: 1,253
Referee: Leo Ramirez

== See also ==
- 1991 Peruvian Segunda División
- 1992 Peruvian Torneo Zonal
