= Mariscal Nieto de Ilo =

Mariscal Nieto
- Full name: Club Mariscal Nieto
- Nickname: Los Canarios
- Founded: 15 May 1966; 60 years ago
- Ground: Estadio Mariscal Nieto, Ilo
- League: Copa Perú
Home colours	Away colours

Mariscal Nieto (Spanish mariscal marshal, after Domingo Nieto) is a Peruvian football club, playing in the city of Ilo, Moquegua, Peru.

== History ==
Mariscal Nieto was founded on May 15, 1966, in the city of Ilo by Ricardo Rodríguez and has since become one of the most traditional and widely supported clubs in the Moquegua region.

In 1984, the club won the Liga Departamental de Moquegua and qualified for the Regional Stage of the 1985 Copa Perú, where it earned promotion to the 1985 Intermedia tournament. Competing in the Southern Zone, Mariscal Nieto finished among the top three teams and secured qualification to the 1986 Torneo Descentralizado. After suffering relegation that same season, the club returned to the top flight for the 1991 Torneo Descentralizado, during the restructuring that reduced the number of professional teams following the dissolution of the Regional Championships system. It later participated in the 1992 Torneo Zonal, but failed to reach the final liguilla and subsequently returned to Copa Perú competition.

In the following years, the club gradually regained its competitive status by winning the Liga Departamental de Moquegua in 2001 and 2002, in addition to several provincial titles. However, in 2012 it was unable to advance beyond the District Stage, which was won by Social EPISA.

Mariscal Nieto qualified for the National Stage of the 2016 Copa Perú, but was eliminated in the first round after drawing 3–3 with Coronel Bolognesi in the final matchday, finishing 31st in the overall standings.

In 2022, the club once again reached the National Stage of the Copa Perú. However, it was eliminated after a 1–0 defeat to Universitario UNAP in the final round, ending the campaign in 42nd place in the national table.

== Honours ==
=== Senior titles ===
Keys

- Record
- ^{(s)} Shared record

Type	Competition	Titles	Runner-up	Winning years	Runner-up years
Regional (League)	Liga Departamental de Moquegua	8	3	1980, 1984, 1987, 1989, 1994, 2001, 2002, 2014	2004, 2016, 2022
Regional (League)	Liga Provincial del Ilo	8	4	2002, 2004, 2010, 2014, 2016, 2018, 2019, 2022	2009, 2013, 2017, 2023
Regional (League)	Liga Distrital de Ilo	12	3	1979, 1980, 1984, 2001, 2009, 2010, 2013, 2014, 2016, 2017, 2018, 2022	2019, 2023, 2026

== See also ==
- List of football clubs in Peru
- Peruvian football league system
