= Deportivo Wanka =

Peruvian football club

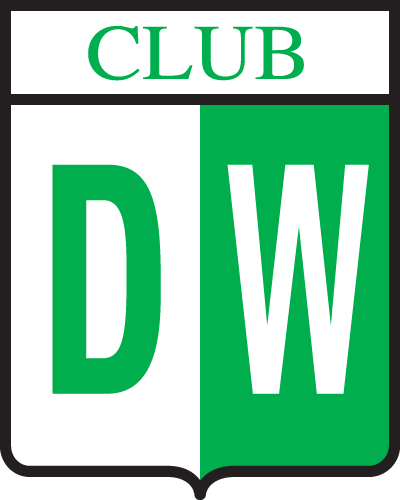
- Full name: Club Deportivo Wanka
- Nickname: Wanka/Los Wankas
- Founded: October 26, 1969; 57 years ago
- Ground: Estadio Huancayo, Huancayo
- Capacity: 20,000
- Chairman: (Peru) Alfonso Miranda
- League: Copa Perú
- 2008: Eliminated in Regional Stage
Home colours	Away colours	Third colours

Deportivo Wanka is a Peruvian football club, based in the city of Huancayo in the Peruvian Andes. It was founded in 1969 and is named after the Wankas people who formerly inhabited the area and after whom the city of Huancayo is named. The current Deportivo Wanka is merged with Deportivo Pesquero of Chimbote but its home city is still Huancayo. They play their home games at Estadio Huancayo. Their last First Division participation was in 2004. They protested against their relegation and were suspended from participating in any football tournament.

== History ==
=== Deportivo Sipesa ===
Club Ovacion Miraflores was founded in 1969 in Chimbote, which would later become Ovación Sipesa. They played in the First Division of Chimbote and received sponsorship from the fishing trade union Sipesa. In 1992, they were promoted to the First Division and, in 1993, they played in the Copa CONMEBOL.

=== Deportivo Pesquero ===
In 1996, the trade union ceased sponsoring the club and therefore changed their club name to Deportivo Pesquero.

=== Deportivo Wanka ===
In 2000, Deportivo Pesquero and Deportivo Wanka merged, giving Huancayo access to the Primera División Peruana

The team aroused controversy in 2004 when it moved its base to Cerro de Pasco, the highest city in the world and almost certainly the world's highest venue for professional football, at an altitude of 4,380 m (13,973 ft) above sea level, well above the point where altitude sickness becomes a problem. Its opponents criticised the move as an attempt to stave off relegation by playing in conditions that no other team could tolerate, including hail, rain, near-freezing temperatures and a lack of oxygen from the high altitude. The club was relegated that season anyway.

== Historic crests ==
Sipesa

Deportivo Pesquero

== Honours ==
=== National ===
==== League ====
- Torneo Zonal:
  - Winners (1): 1992

==== National cups ====
- Torneo Intermedio:
  - Runner-up (1): 1993

=== Regional ===
- Liga Departamental de Ancash:
  - Winners (1): 1991
- Liga Distrital de Chimbote:
  - Runner-up (1): 1989

== Outside football ==
In 2006, it emerged that Deportivo Wanka shirts had become a cult collectible item for British football fans, with over 1,000 shirts selling in the space of a few weeks. The British slang word wanker "one who masturbates", sounds like Wanka when said with a (non-rhotic) British accent. The Sun quoted a club spokesman as saying that "It is very strange. Everyone in Britain seems to think we have a funny name."

== See also ==
- List of football clubs in Peru
- Peruvian football league system
