= Estadio Julio Lores Colán =

Multi-use stadium in Huaral, Peru

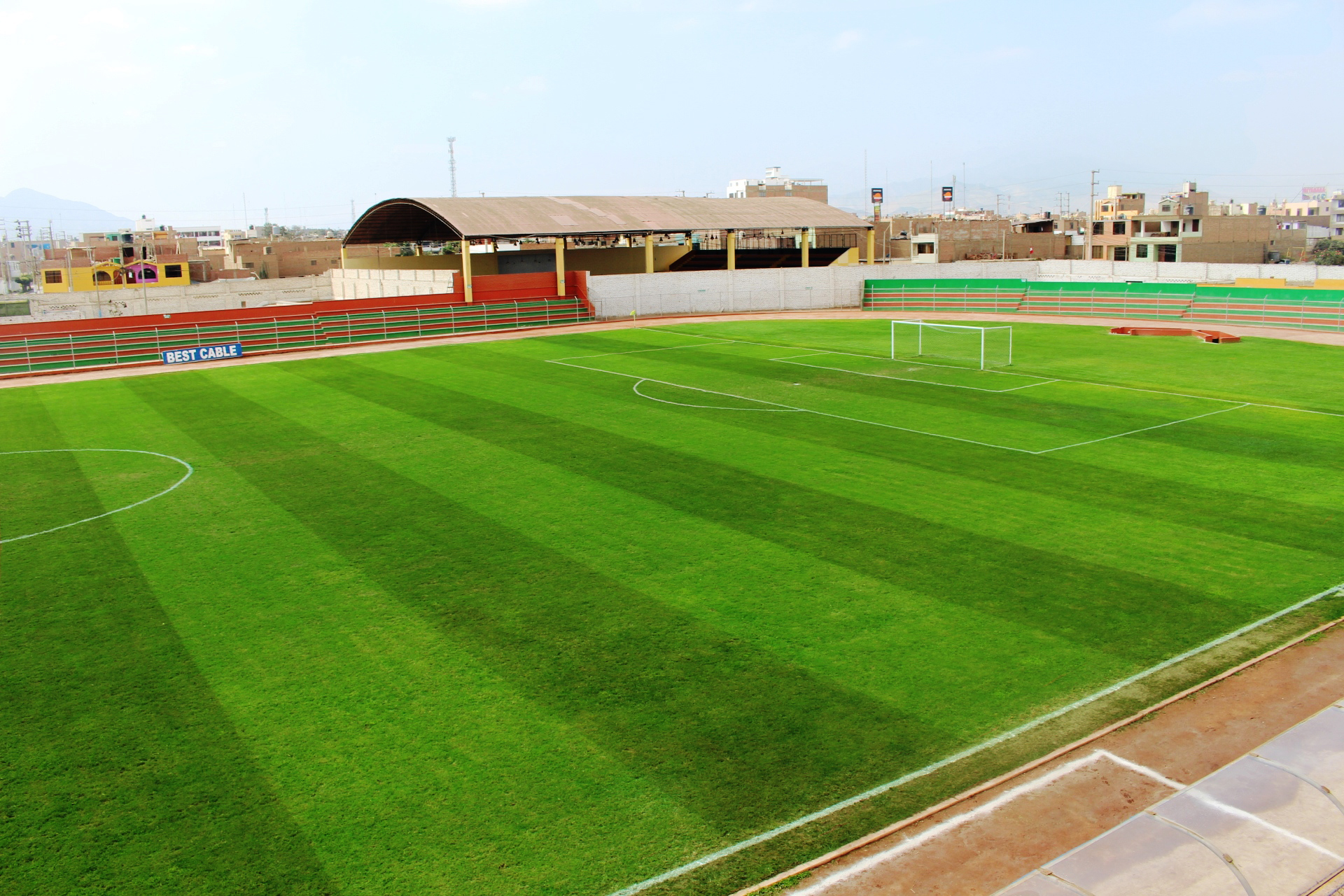
- Interactive map of Estadio Julio Lores Colán
- Full name: Julio Lores Colán Municipal Stadium
- Location: Huaral, Peru
- Owner: Instituto Peruano del Deporte (IPD)
- Capacity: 6,000

Construction
- Opened: 1952

Tenant
- Unión Huaral

Estadio Julio Lores Colán is a multi-use stadium in Huaral, Peru. It is currently used by football team Unión Huaral. The stadium holds 6,000 people. The stadium is named for Julio Lores Colán, born in 1908, who was a Peruvian-Mexican football forward who played for Peru in the 1930 FIFA World Cup.

Built in 1952, the stadium has an official capacity of 5,962 spectators in its four stands (less than the actual capacity of 10,000), distributed as follows:

- North and South stands: 1,650 spectators
- East stands: 1,176
- West stands: 1,270
- Box: 216

The grandstand, located in the West, has four booths for radio and television transmission. The stadium is located five minutes from the city center, on the road to Chancay.
