= Unión Huaral =

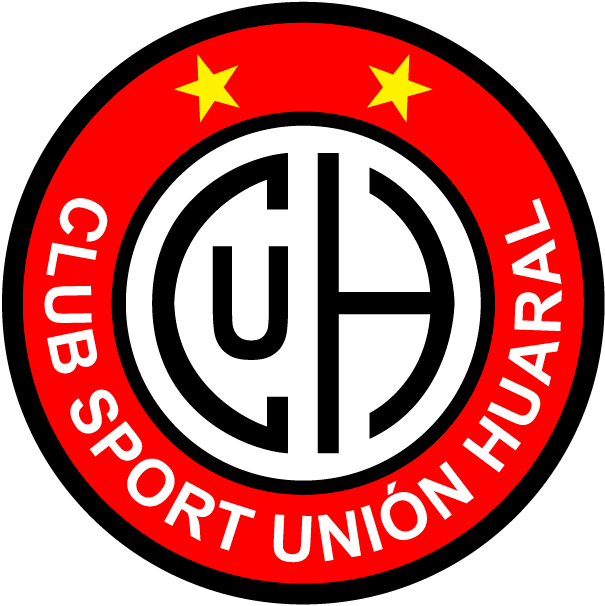
- Full name: Club Sport Unión Huaral (Huaral Union Sport Club)
- Nicknames: Los Naranjeros; Los Pelícanos; El Buldócer; Los Huaralinos
- Founded: September 20, 1947; 78 years ago
- Ground: Estadio Julio Lores Colán
- Capacity: 6,000
- Chairman: (Peru) Arturo Sánchez Valencia
- Manager: (Argentina) Adrián Blas Taffarel
- League: Liga 3
- 2024: Liga 2, 18th (Disqualified)
Home colours	Away colours	Third colours

Club Sport Unión Huaral, more commonly known as Unión Huaral, is a Peruvian football club, from the city of Huaral. It was founded in 1947 and currently competes in the Peruvian Tercera División.

== History ==
The Club Sport Unión Huaral was founded at the initiative of a group of enthusiastic young men who, meeting at the home of Don Nicolás Pintado, decided to form the neighborhood football team under the name of Club Unión, since most of them lived on Unión Street. This team would compete against teams from neighboring haciendas and neighborhoods.

In 1974, after defeating 17 Lima teams and defeating Deportivo Sider Perú of Chimbote in a third match on neutral ground, they won the Lima-North regional title and thus achieved their long-awaited promotion to the Peruvian Primera División. That year, the usual Copa final was not played, as the number of teams in the decentralized championship was increased from 18 to 22, allowing the Copa Perú champions of each region to be promoted directly.

The club won the First Division for the first time in 1976 the second time in 1989. They were the first club to take the Peruvian title out of the traditional strongholds of Lima and Callao provinces. They were runners-up in 1974. From winning the First Division, they qualified for the Copa Libertadores in 1975 and 1977, where they were eliminated in the First Round on both occasions.

The club has played at the highest level of Peruvian football on twenty four occasions, from 1974 until 1991, 1993, 1995 and from 2003 until 2006, when it was relegated to the Peruvian Segunda División being relegated in 2007. Unión Huaral won the second division in 1992, 1994 and 2002.

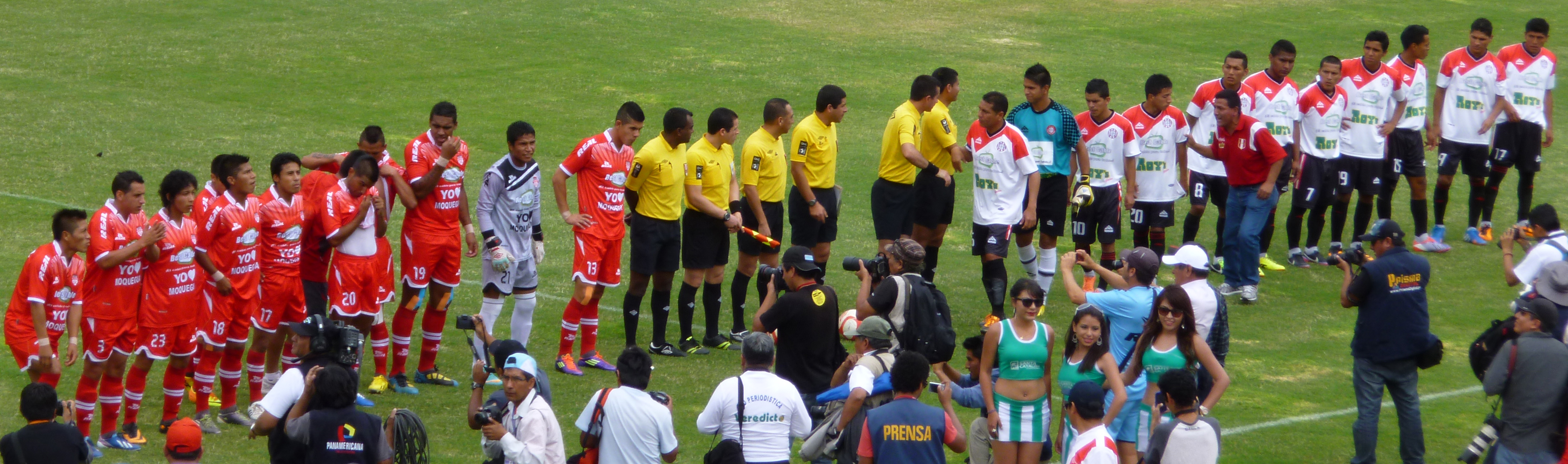
Unión Huaral playing against San Simón

In the 2011 Torneo Intermedio, the club was eliminated by Deportivo Municipal in the Round of 16. In 2013, the club had a great campaign in the Copa Perú finishing runner-up, losing the final against San Simon. They were once again promoted to the Peruvian Segunda División. However, they got disqualified during the 2024 Liga 2 season, being relegated to the Peruvian Tercera División along with Juan Aurich.

== Stadium ==
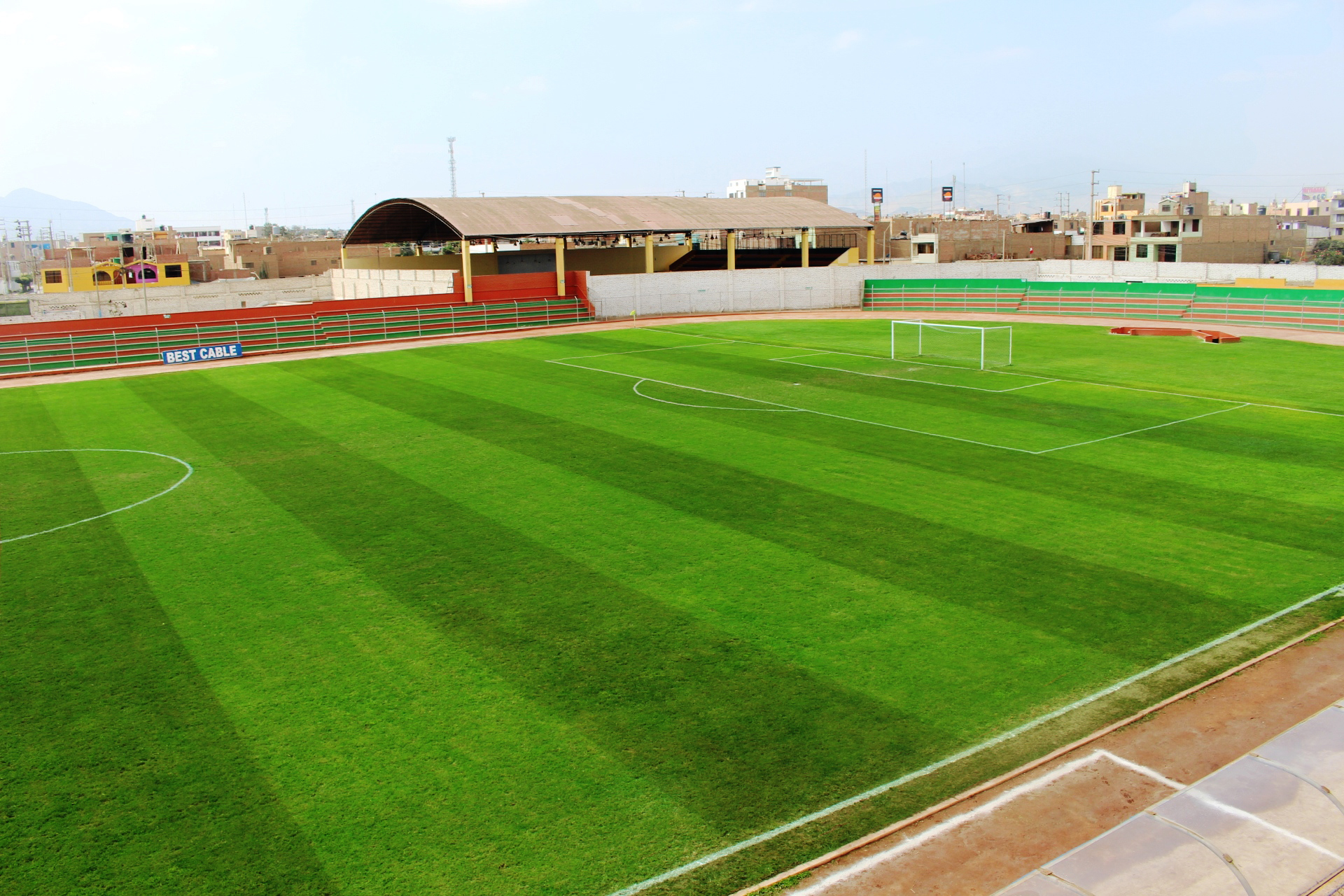
Estadio Julio Lores Colán

Unión Huaral plays at Estadio Julio Lores Colán, named after the Julio Lores who represented Peru at the 1930 FIFA World Cup. Located in Huaral, the stadium has a capacity of 6,000.

== Current squad ==
As of 31 March 2025

Note: Flags indicate national team as defined under FIFA eligibility rules; some limited exceptions apply. Players may hold more than one non-FIFA nationality.

No.	Pos.	Nation	Player
1	GK	PER	Walter Cárdenas
2	DF	PER	Franco Núñez
3	DF	PER	Marcos Ortiz
4	DF	PER	Manuel Contreras
5	MF	ARG	César Amarilla
7	FW	PER	Luis Aguirre (Captain)
8	MF	PER	Emerson García
9	FW	PER	Sebastián La Torre
10	MF	ARG	Lautaro Flores
11	MF	PER	D'Alessandro Taco
12	GK	PER	Carlos Gómez
13	DF	PER	Manuel Calderón

No.	Pos.	Nation	Player
14	MF	PER	Luis Reyna
15	FW	PER	Ethiene Gonzales
16	FW	PER	Ivan Rivera
17	FW	PER	Édson Ávila
18	MF	PER	Roinier Uriarte
19	DF	PER	Danfer Doy
21	DF	PER	Mathias Ubillus
23	FW	PER	Snayder Laines
24	MF	PER	Sebastián Ortiz
25	MF	PER	Mauricio Zuloaga
29	FW	PER	Alex Calcina
-	MF	PER	Arian Gutierrez

== Honours ==
=== Senior titles ===
Keys

- Record
- ^{(s)} Shared record

Type	Competition	Titles	Runner-up	Winning years	Runner-up years
National (League)	Primera División	2	1	1976, 1989	1974
National (League)	Segunda División	3	—	1992, 1994, 2002	—
National (League)	Torneo Zonal	—	1	—	1992
National (League)	Copa Perú	—	1	—	2013
Half-year / Short tournament (League)	Torneo Regional	1	2	1989–II	1987, 1988
Half-year / Short tournament (League)	Torneo Zona Metropolitana	1	1	1988 Grupo B	1987
Half-year / Short tournament (League)	Torneo Clausura (Liga 2)	1	—	2021	—
Half-year / Short tournament (League)	Torneo Descentralizado	—	1	—	1987
Half-year / Short tournament (League)	Torneo Interzonal	1	1	1978	1977 Grupo B
Regional (League)	Región IV	1	—	2013	—
Regional (League)	Liga Departamental de Lima	1	1	1973	2013
Regional (League)	Liga Provincial de Huaral	5	1	1972, 1973, 2009, 2011, 2012	2013
Regional (League)	Liga Distrital de Huaral	6	—	1972, 1973, 2009, 2011, 2012, 2013	—

== Performance in CONMEBOL competitions ==
- Copa Libertadores: 3 appearances

1975: First Round
1977: First Round
1990: Second Round

== See also ==
- List of football clubs in Peru
- Peruvian football league system
