= Unión Huayllaspanca =

- Full name: Club Unión Huayllaspanca
- Founded: 1954
- Ground: Estadio Huancayo; Huancayo, Peru
- Capacity: 20,000
- League: Copa Perú
Home colours

Unión Huayllaspanca was a Peruvian football club, playing in the city of Huancayo, Junín, Peru.

== History ==
Unión Huayllaspanca participated in the Peruvian Primera División in the 1990 Torneo Descentralizado and 1991 Torneo Descentralizado.

The club won the 1991 Central Zone group and qualified to the Regional I's octagonal, but was eliminated by Universitario.

== Honors ==
=== Regional ===
- Liga Distrital de Sapallanga:

Runner-up (1): 2024

== See also ==
- List of football clubs in Peru
- Peruvian football league system
