= Estadio Campeones del 36 =

Peruvian stadium

Coordinates: 4.8970°S 80.6844°W

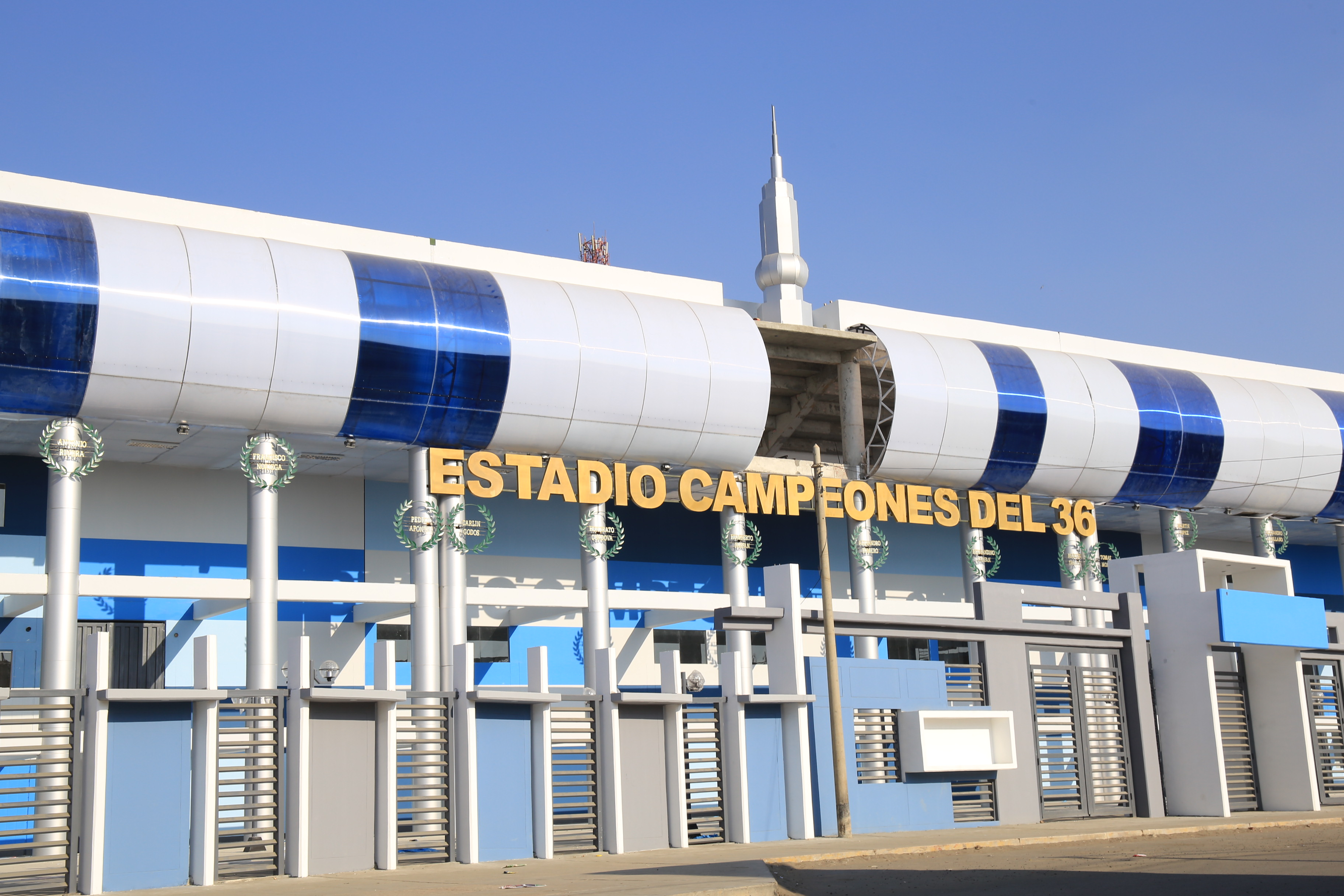
- Interactive map of Estadio Campeones del 36
- Full name: Estadio Campeones del 36
- Location: Sullana, Peru
- Owner: Municipality of Sullana
- Capacity: 12,000
- Surface: Grass

Construction
- Built: 2000
- Opened: 2000

Tenant
- Alianza Atlético

The Estadio Campeones del 36 is a multi-use stadium in Sullana, Peru. It is used by the football team Alianza Atlético. The stadium holds 12,000 people and was built in 2000. It is a small stadium which was expanded.

The venue name, Champions of 1936, is misleading. No Peruvian League was actually played in 1936, as the national team was preparing itself to compete in the 1936 Summer Olympics in Germany. Alianza Atlético did, however, win a 1935 Campeonato Nacional de Fútbol Amateur (representing their home region, Piura) governed by the Peruvian Football Federation, and the name stuck despite not being recognized officially as national champions thereafter.

The venue was remodeled and re-inaugurated in 2018 with an enlarged capacity of 12,000.

== History ==
=== Old ground ===
The land located in the Buenos Aires neighborhood has existed since 1917, when it was only an esplanade for the practice of various sports. Within it, wooden stands were built that were part of the Gerónimo Seminario and Jaime Indoor Coliseum, and formed a small stadium. In 1928, after the founding of the Sullana Sports Football League, the Pro-Gymnasium Committee was formed, chaired by Dr. Carlos Enrique Zapata. The future Sullana Municipal Stadium was fenced with cane and corrugated iron.

Years later, the central government built two stands and an obelisk with a brazier. In 1938, the mayor José Ildefonso Coloma inaugurated the stands and named them Campeones del 36 in homage to the Sullana team, which won the National Football Championship on January 26, 1936.

For decades it was said that the stadium belonged to Jorge Chávez and then to the Football League. At the beginning of 1966, the Provincial Council gave part of the land to the Provincial Volleyball League, so that it could have its coliseum, which was inaugurated two years later.

=== Reinaguration ===
On August 15, 2017, construction began on the stadium's north stand, which was inaugurated on August 13, 2018 in the match valid for the 19th date of the Peruvian Segunda División, where Alianza Atlético defeated Serrato Pacasmayo 8-0. The eastern stand of the stadium is still under construction.

This event marked the return of professional football to the province of Sullana, after nine years of absence, which made Alianza Atlético go from city to city looking for sports venues suitable for the use of professional football. The new remodeled stadium became the home ground of the team, playing in the city in which they are based in.

In recent years, the Estadio Campeones del 36 has become one of the various stadiums in Peru that are in dire need of renovation and whose infrastructure is underdeveloped compared to other stadiums. Estadio Miguel Grau (Piura) and Estadio Elías Aguirre, other stadiums in northern Peru, suffer from the same situation.

== See also ==
- Alianza Atlético
- List of football stadiums in Peru
