= 1994 Peruvian Segunda División =

Peruvian Segunda División
- Season: 1994
- Champions: Unión Huaral
- Relegated: Juventud La Palma; José Carlos Mariátegui

The 1994 Peruvian Segunda División, the second division of Peruvian football (soccer), was played by 12 teams. the tournament winner, Unión Huaral was promoted to the 1995 Torneo Descentralizado. The tournament was played on a home-and-away round-robin basis.

Before the start of the season, the Club Enrique Lau Chun resumed the name he used in 1992, after losing the support of Centro Iqueño.

== Teams ==
=== Team changes ===
Relegated from 1993 Primera División	Promoted from 1993 Liga Provincial de Lima	Promoted to 1994 Primera División	Relegated to 1994 Copa Perú
▼ Unión Huaral (15th)	▲ Mixto Estudiantil (1st) ▲ José Carlos Mariátegui (2nd)	▲ Ciclista Lima (1st)	▼ Octavio Espinosa (11th) ▼AELU (12th)

=== Stadia and Locations ===
Team	City
Alcides Vigo	Barranco, Lima
América Cochahuayco	San Luis, Lima
Bella Esperanza	Cerro Azul, Lima
Deportivo Zúñiga	La Molina, Lima
Enrique Lau Chun	La Molina, Lima
Guardia Republicana	La Molina, Lima
Hijos de Yurimaguas	Callao
José Carlos Mariátegui	Ate, Lima
Juventud La Palma	Huacho
Metor–Lawn Tennis	Lima
Mixto Estudiantil	San Martín de Porres, Lima
Unión Huaral	Huaral

== League table ==
=== Standings ===
Pos	Team	Pld	W	D	L	GF	GA	GD	Pts	Promotion or relegation
1	Unión Huaral (C)	22	14	4	4	34	17	+17	32	1995 Primera División
2	Hijos de Yurimaguas	22	11	8	3	30	15	+15	30	
3	Deportivo Zúñiga	22	13	4	5	38	23	+15	30	
4	Guardia Republicana	22	10	6	6	26	15	+11	26	
5	Meteor–Lawn Tennis	22	11	4	7	28	16	+12	26	
6	Alcides Vigo	22	9	5	8	30	23	+7	23	
7	América Cochahuayco	22	6	8	8	34	27	+7	20	
8	Bella Esperanza	22	4	11	7	13	23	−10	19	
9	Enrique Lau Chun	22	6	6	10	19	25	−6	18	
10	Mixto Estudiantil (O)	22	3	8	11	16	32	−16	14	Relegation play-off
11	José Carlos Mariátegui (R)	22	3	8	11	18	30	−12	14	Relegation play-off
12	Juventud La Palma (R)	22	4	4	14	17	51	−34	12	1995 Copa Perú

(C) Champions; (O) Play-off winners; (R) Relegated

== See also ==
- 1994 Torneo Descentralizado
- 1994 Copa Perú
