= 1989 Peruvian Segunda División =

Peruvian Segunda División
- Season: 1989
- Dates: 22 April – 3 December 1989
- Champions: Sport Boys
- Relegated: Deportivo Aviación; Esther Grande de Bentín

The 1989 Peruvian Segunda División, the second division of Peruvian football (soccer), was played by 20 teams. The tournament winner, Sport Boys was promoted to the 1990 Torneo Descentralizado.

== Teams ==
=== Team changes ===
Relegated from 1988 Primera División	Promoted from 1988 Región IV	Promoted to 1989 Primera División	Relegated to 1989 Copa Perú
▼ Guardia Republicana (12th)	▲ Bella Esperanza (1st) ▲ Sport Puerto Aéreo (2nd)	▲ Defensor Lima (1st)	▼ Alcides Vigo (Zona Norte - 10th) ▼ Atlético Chalaco (Zona Norte - 11th) ▼ Grumete Medina (Zona Sur - 10th) ▼ Once Estrellas (Zona Sur - 11th)

=== Stadia and Locations ===
Team	City
Aurora Miraflores	Miraflores, Lima
Bella Esperanza	Cerro Azul, Lima
CITEN	Callao
Defensor Kiwi	Chorrillos, Lima
Defensor Rímac	Chaclacayo, Lima
Deportivo Aviación	Pisco
ENAPU	Callao
Enrique Lau Chun	La Molina, Lima
Esther Grande de Bentín	Rímac, Lima
ETE	Chorrillos, Lima
Guardia Republicana	La Molina, Lima
Hijos de Yurimaguas	Ventanilla
Independiente	San Vicente de Cañete
Juventud La Palma	Huacho
Juventud Progreso	Barranca
Lawn Tennis	Jesús María, Lima
Real Olímpico	San Martín de Porres
Sport Boys	Callao
Sport Puerto Aéreo	La Tinguiña, Ica
Walter Ormeño	Imperial, Cañete

== Group stage ==
=== Zona Norte ===
Pos	Team	Pld	W	D	L	GF	GA	GD	Pts	Qualification	SBA	JLP	ENA	JPR	HIJ	LTF	OLÍ	DRÍ	CIT	EGR
1	Sport Boys	18	11	5	2	37	17	+20	27	Liguilla Final		2–1	1–1	1–2	3–0	4–1	2–1	3–0	2–1	1–0
2	Juventud La Palma	0	0	0	0	0	0	0	0	Liguilla Final	1–1									
3	ENAPU	0	0	0	0	0	0	0	0	Liguilla Final	2–1									
4	Juventud Progreso	0	0	0	0	0	0	0	0		2–2									
5	Hijos de Yurimaguas	0	0	0	0	0	0	0	0		0–1									
6	Lawn Tennis	0	0	0	0	0	0	0	0		2–2									
7	Real Olímpico	0	0	0	0	0	0	0	0		0–3									
8	Defensor Rímac	0	0	0	0	0	0	0	0		2–4									
9	CITEN	0	0	0	0	0	0	0	0		1–4									
10	Esther Grande de Bentín	0	0	0	0	0	0	0	0	Copa Perú	0–0									

Legend: Blue = home team win; Yellow = draw; Red = away team win.

=== Zona Sur ===
Pos	Team	Pld	W	D	L	GF	GA	GD	Pts	Qualification	GRE	BES	DKI	ELC	WOR	SPA	INDC	AMI	ETE	AVIP
1	Guardia Republicana	0	0	0	0	0	0	0	0	Liguilla Final										
2	Bella Esperanza	0	0	0	0	0	0	0	0	Liguilla Final										
3	Defensor Kiwi	0	0	0	0	0	0	0	0	Liguilla Final										
4	Enrique Lau Chun	0	0	0	0	0	0	0	0											
5	Walter Ormeño	0	0	0	0	0	0	0	0											
6	Sport Puerto Aéreo	0	0	0	0	0	0	0	0											
7	Independiente	0	0	0	0	0	0	0	0											
8	Aurora Miraflores	0	0	0	0	0	0	0	0											
9	ETE	0	0	0	0	0	0	0	0											
10	Deportivo Aviación	0	0	0	0	0	0	0	0	Copa Perú										

Legend: Blue = home team win; Yellow = draw; Red = away team win.

== Liguilla Final ==
=== Standings ===
Pos	Team	Pld	W	D	L	GF	GA	GD	Pts	Promotion	SBA	JLP	GRE	ENA	DKI	BES
1	Sport Boys	10	8	1	1	21	5	+16	19	1990 Primera División		2–1	1–1	3–1	3–1	3–0
2	Juventud La Palma	0	0	0	0	0	0	0	0	Promotion Play-off	1–0		–	–	–	–
3	Guardia Republicana	0	0	0	0	0	0	0	0		0–3	–		–	–	–
4	ENAPU	0	0	0	0	0	0	0	0		0–2	–	–		–	–
5	Defensor Kiwi	0	0	0	0	0	0	0	0		0–2	–	–	–		–
6	Bella Esperanza	0	0	0	0	0	0	0	0		0–2	–	–	–	–	

Legend: Blue = home team win; Yellow = draw; Red = away team win.

=== Promotion play-off ===
28 March 1990

San Agustín	0–0	Juventud La Palma

Juventud La Palma	1–1	San Agustín

3 April 1990

San Agustín	1–1 (5–4 PSO)	Juventud La Palma

== See also ==
- 1989 Torneo Descentralizado
- 1989 Torneo Plácido Galindo
