= 1993 Peruvian Segunda División =

Peruvian Segunda División
- Season: 1993
- Champions: Ciclista Lima
- Relegated: AELU; Octavio Espinosa

The 1993 Peruvian Segunda División, the second division of Peruvian football (soccer), was played by 12 teams. the tournament winner, Ciclista Lima was promoted to the 1994 Torneo Descentralizado. The tournament was played on a home-and-away round-robin basis.

The Club Enrique Lau Chun received financial support from the Centro Iqueño.

== Teams ==
=== Team changes ===
| Relegated from 1992 Primera División | Promoted from 1992 Liga Provincial de Lima | Promoted from 1992 Región IV | Promoted to 1993 Primera División | Relegated to 1993 Copa Perú |
|---|---|---|---|---|
| ▼ Hijos de Yurimaguas (16th) | ▲ América Cochahuayco (1st) | ▲ Juventud La Palma (1st) | ▲ Unión Huaral (1st) | ▼ Sport Puerto Aéreo (11th) ▼ Internazionale (12th) |

=== Stadia and Locations ===
| Team | City |
|---|---|
| AELU | Pueblo Libre, Lima |
| Alcides Vigo | Barranco, Lima |
| América Cochahuayco | San Luis, Lima |
| Bella Esperanza | Cerro Azul, Lima |
| Centro Iqueño | Lima |
| Ciclista Lima | Lima |
| Deportivo Zúñiga | La Molina, Lima |
| Guardia Republicana | La Molina, Lima |
| Hijos de Yurimaguas | Callao |
| Juventud La Palma | Huacho |
| Metor–Lawn Tennis | Lima |
| Octavio Espinosa | Ica |

== League table ==
=== Standings ===
| Pos | Team | Pld | W | D | L | GF | GA | GD | Pts | Promotion or relegation |
|---|---|---|---|---|---|---|---|---|---|---|
| 1 | Ciclista Lima (C) | 22 | 16 | 3 | 3 | 39 | 14 | +25 | 35 | 1994 Primera División |
| 2 | Guardia Republicana | 22 | 12 | 6 | 4 | 26 | 15 | +11 | 30 | |
| 3 | Alcides Vigo | 22 | 10 | 6 | 6 | 31 | 25 | +6 | 26 | |
| 4 | Bella Esperanza | 22 | 8 | 7 | 7 | 28 | 28 | 0 | 23 | |
| 5 | Juventud La Palma | 22 | 6 | 10 | 6 | 28 | 31 | −3 | 22 | |
| 6 | Centro Iqueño | 22 | 8 | 5 | 9 | 30 | 26 | +4 | 21 | |
| 7 | Meteor–Lawn Tennis | 22 | 8 | 5 | 9 | 32 | 32 | 0 | 21 | |
| 8 | Hijos de Yurimaguas | 22 | 8 | 5 | 9 | 19 | 22 | −3 | 21 | |
| 9 | América Cochahuayco | 22 | 7 | 5 | 10 | 29 | 39 | −10 | 19 | |
| 10 | Deportivo Zúñiga | 22 | 5 | 8 | 9 | 24 | 35 | −11 | 18 | |
| 11 | Octavio Espinosa (R) | 22 | 5 | 5 | 12 | 20 | 31 | −11 | 15 | 1994 Copa Perú |
| 12 | AELU (R) | 22 | 4 | 5 | 13 | 31 | 42 | −11 | 13 | 1994 Copa Perú |

(C) Champions; (R) Relegated

== See also ==
- 1993 Torneo Descentralizado
- 1993 Copa Perú
