= 1991 Peruvian Segunda División =

Peruvian Segunda División
- Season: 1991
- Champions: Enrique Lau Chun
- Relegated: Aurora Cantolao; Cosmos 2000; ENAPU; Independiente; Juan Mata; Juventud La Palma; Juventud Progreso; Lawn Tennis; Mercado Mayorista; Real Olímpico; Sport Los Dinámicos; Walter Ormeño

The 1991 Peruvian Segunda División, the second division of Peruvian football (soccer), was played by 10 teams. The tournament winner, Enrique Lau Chun.

- Independiente withdrew before the start of the season and were relegated to the Copa Perú.

== Teams ==
=== Team changes ===
Relegated from 1990 Primera División	Promoted from 1990 Región IV	Promoted from 1990 Liga Provincial de Lima	Promoted to 1991 Primera División	Relegated to 1991 Copa Perú
▼ Meteor Sport (12th)	▲ Sport Dinámicos (1st)	▲ Cosmos 2000 (1st)	▲ Hijos de Yurimaguas (1st)	▼CITEN (Relegation Playoff - 3rd) ▼ Juventud Huascarán (Zona Norte - 6th) ▼ETE (Zona Metropolitana - 8th) ▼ Sport Puerto Aéreo (Zona Sur - 6th)

=== Stadia and Locations ===
Team	City
Aurora Cantolao	Miraflores, Lima
Bella Esperanza	Cerro Azul, Lima
Cosmos 2000	La Victoria, Lima
Defensor Kiwi–Ciclista Lima	Chorrillos, Lima
Deportivo Zúñiga	La Molina, Lima
ENAPU	Callao
Enrique Lau Chun	La Molina, Lima
Guardia Republicana	La Molina, Lima
Juan Mata	Nasca
Juventud La Palma	Huacho
Juventud Progreso	Barranca
Lawn Tennis	Jesús María, Lima
Mercado Mayorista	La Victoria, Lima
Metor Sport	Lima
Real Olímpico	San Martín de Porres
Sport Dinámicos	Chancay
Walter Ormeño	Imperial, Cañete

== League table ==
=== Standings ===
Pos	Team	Pld	W	D	L	GF	GA	GD	Pts	Qualification or relegation
1	Enrique Lau Chun (C)	0	0	0	0	0	0	0	0	Champion
2	Deportivo Zúñiga	0	0	0	0	0	0	0	0	
3	Guardia Republicana	0	0	0	0	0	0	0	0	
4	Meteor Sport	0	0	0	0	0	0	0	0	
5	Bella Esperanza	0	0	0	0	0	0	0	0	
6	Defensor Kiwi–Ciclista Lima	0	0	0	0	0	0	0	0	
7	Juventud La Palma	0	0	0	0	0	0	0	0	1992 Copa Perú
8	Juan Mata	0	0	0	0	0	0	0	0	1992 Copa Perú
9	Walter Ormeño	0	0	0	0	0	0	0	0	1992 Copa Perú
10	Sport Dinámicos	0	0	0	0	0	0	0	0	1992 Copa Perú
11	Lawn Tennis	0	0	0	0	0	0	0	0	1992 Copa Perú
12	Mercado Mayorista	0	0	0	0	0	0	0	0	1992 Copa Perú
13	Aurora Cantolao	0	0	0	0	0	0	0	0	1992 Copa Perú
14	Juventud Progreso	0	0	0	0	0	0	0	0	1992 Copa Perú
15	Real Olímpico	0	0	0	0	0	0	0	0	1992 Copa Perú
16	ENAPU	0	0	0	0	0	0	0	0	1992 Copa Perú
17	Cosmos 2000	0	0	0	0	0	0	0	0	1992 Copa Perú

(C) Champions

== See also ==
- 1991 Torneo Descentralizado
