= 1990 Peruvian Segunda División =

Peruvian Segunda División
- Season: 1990
- Dates: 10 August 1990 – 10 February 1991
- Champions: Hijos de Yurimaguas
- Relegated: CITEN; ETE; Juventud Huascarán; Sport Puerto Aéreo

The 1990 Peruvian Segunda División, the second division of Peruvian football (soccer), was played by 20 teams. The tournament winner, Hijos de Yurimaguas was promoted to the 1991 Torneo Descentralizado.

== Teams ==
=== Team changes ===
Promoted from 1989 Región IV	Promoted from 1989 Liga Provincial de Lima	Promoted to 1990 Primera División	Relegated to 1990 Copa Perú
▲ Juan Mata (1st)	▲ Mercado Mayorista (1st) ▲ Juventud Huascarán (2nd)	▲ Sport Boys (1st)	▼ Esther Grande de Bentín (Zona Norte - 10th) ▼ Deportivo Aviación (Zona Sur - 10th)

=== Stadia and Locations ===
Team	City
Aurora Miraflores	Miraflores, Lima
Bella Esperanza	Cerro Azul, Lima
CITEN	Callao
Defensor Kiwi	Chorrillos, Lima
Defensor Rímac	Chaclacayo, Lima
ENAPU	Callao
Enrique Lau Chun	La Molina, Lima
ETE	Chorrillos, Lima
Guardia Republicana	La Molina, Lima
Hijos de Yurimaguas	Ventanilla
Independiente	San Vicente de Cañete
Juan Mata	Nasca
Juventud Huascarán	La Victoria, Lima
Juventud La Palma	Huacho
Juventud Progreso	Barranca
Lawn Tennis	Jesús María, Lima
Mercado Mayorista	La Victoria, Lima
Real Olímpico	San Martín de Porres
Sport Puerto Aéreo	La Tinguiña, Ica
Walter Ormeño	Imperial, Cañete

== Group stage ==
=== Zona Norte ===
Pos	Team	Pld	W	D	L	GF	GA	GD	Pts	Qualification	LTF	JPR	JLP	ELC	MAY	HUA
1	Lawn Tennis	0	0	0	0	0	0	0	0	Liguilla						
2	Juventud Progreso	0	0	0	0	0	0	0	0	Liguilla						
3	Juventud La Palma	0	0	0	0	0	0	0	0	Liguilla						
4	Enrique Lau Chun	0	0	0	0	0	0	0	0							
5	Mercado Mayorista	0	0	0	0	0	0	0	0	Relegation Playoff						
6	Juventud Huascarán	0	0	0	0	0	0	0	0	Copa Perú						

Legend: Blue = home team win; Yellow = draw; Red = away team win.

=== Zona Metropolitana ===
Pos	Team	Pld	W	D	L	GF	GA	GD	Pts	Qualification	HIJ	GRE	AUR	ENA	DRÍ	OLÍ	CIT	ETE
1	Hijos de Yurimaguas	0	0	0	0	0	0	0	0	Liguilla								
2	Guardia Republicana	0	0	0	0	0	0	0	0	Liguilla								
3	Aurora Cantolao	0	0	0	0	0	0	0	0	Liguilla								
4	ENAPU	0	0	0	0	0	0	0	0									
5	Defensor Rímac	0	0	0	0	0	0	0	0									
6	Real Olímpico	0	0	0	0	0	0	0	0									
7	CITEN	0	0	0	0	0	0	0	0	Relegation Playoff								
8	ETE	0	0	0	0	0	0	0	0	Copa Perú								

Legend: Blue = home team win; Yellow = draw; Red = away team win.

=== Zona Sur ===
Pos	Team	Pld	W	D	L	GF	GA	GD	Pts	Qualification	BES	WOR	DKI	INDC	MAT	SPA
1	Bella Esperanza	0	0	0	0	0	0	0	0	Liguilla						
2	Walter Ormeño	0	0	0	0	0	0	0	0	Liguilla						
3	Defensor Kiwi	0	0	0	0	0	0	0	0							
4	Independiente	0	0	0	0	0	0	0	0							
5	Juan Mata	0	0	0	0	0	0	0	0	Relegation Playoff						
6	Sport Puerto Aéreo	0	0	0	0	0	0	0	0	Copa Perú						

Legend: Blue = home team win; Yellow = draw; Red = away team win.

== Liguilla Final ==
=== Standings ===
Pos	Team	Pld	W	D	L	GF	GA	GD	Pts	Promotion	HIJ	WOR	JLP	GRE	JPR	BES	AMI	LAW
1	Hijos de Yurimaguas	14	8	4	2	19	8	+11	20	1991 Primera División								
2	Walter Ormeño	14	6	6	2	24	17	+7	18									
3	Juventud La Palma	13	4	7	2	15	13	+2	15									
4	Guardia Republicana	14	5	5	4	18	13	+5	15									
5	Juventud Progreso	13	5	5	3	13	10	+3	15									
6	Bella Esperanza	12	1	7	4	14	19	−5	9									
7	Aurora Cantolao	14	2	3	9	13	27	−14	7									
8	Lawn Tennis	12	2	3	7	12	22	−10	7									

Source: Diario El Comercio 1991
Legend: Blue = home team win; Yellow = draw; Red = away team win.

== Relegation Playoff ==
Pos	Team	Pld	W	D	L	GF	GA	GD	Pts	Qualification	MAY	MAT	CIT
1	Mercado Mayorista	0	0	0	0	0	0	0	0				
2	Juan Mata	0	0	0	0	0	0	0	0				
3	CITEN	0	0	0	0	0	0	0	0	Copa Perú			

Legend: Blue = home team win; Yellow = draw; Red = away team win.

== See also ==
- 1990 Torneo Descentralizado
