= 1996 Peruvian Segunda División =

Peruvian Segunda División
- Season: 1996
- Champions: Alcides Vigo
- Relegated: Virgen de Chapi; Santa Marina Norte

The 1996 Peruvian Segunda División, the second division of Peruvian football (soccer), was played by 12 teams. the tournament winner, Alcides Vigo was promoted to the 1997 Torneo Descentralizado. The tournament was played on a home-and-away round-robin basis.

== Teams ==
=== Team changes ===
Relegated from 1995 Primera División	Promoted from 1995 Liga Provincial de Lima	Promoted to 1996 Primera División	Relegated to 1996 Copa Perú
▼ Unión Huaral (15th)	▲ Virgen de Chapi (1st) ▲ Santa Marina Norte (2nd)	▲ Guardia Republicana (1st)	▼ Deportivo Municipal (Chorrillos) (11th) ▼ Mixto Estudiantil (12th)

=== Stadia and Locations ===
Team	City
Alcides Vigo	Barranco, Lima
América Cochahuayco	San Luis, Lima
Bella Esperanza	Cerro Azul, Lima
Defensor Lima	Breña, Lima
Deportivo Zúñiga	La Molina, Lima
Hijos de Yurimaguas	Callao
Lawn Tennis	Jesús María, Lima
Metor Sport	Lima
Santa Marina Norte	Callao
Sport Agustino	El Agustino, Lima
Unión Huaral	Huaral
Virgen de Chapi	Santa Anita, Lima

== League table ==
=== Standings ===
Pos	Team	Pld	W	D	L	GF	GA	GD	Pts	Promotion or relegation
1	Alcides Vigo (C, O)	22	13	7	2	33	13	+20	46	Title Play-off
2	Hijos de Yurimaguas	22	13	7	2	30	18	+12	46	Title Play-off
3	Unión Huaral	22	12	7	3	36	17	+19	43	
4	Bella Esperanza	22	11	8	3	25	23	+2	41	
5	Lawn Tennis	22	9	6	7	26	15	+11	33	
6	Deportivo Zúñiga	22	8	5	9	23	25	−2	29	
7	América Cochahuayco	22	5	10	7	23	25	−2	25	
8	Defensor Lima	22	4	7	11	13	33	−20	19	
9	Sport Agustino	22	2	12	8	19	26	−7	18	
10	Meteor Sport	22	4	6	12	15	28	−13	18	
11	Santa Marina Norte (R)	22	3	8	11	13	26	−13	17	1997 Copa Perú
12	Virgen de Chapi (R)	22	3	7	12	19	35	−16	16	1997 Copa Perú

Updated to match(es) played on 1996. Source:
Rules for classification: 1) points; 2) goal difference; 3) number of goals scored.
(C) Champions; (O) Play-off winners; (R) Relegated

== Title Play-off ==
7 December 1996

Alcides Vigo	0–0	Hijos de Yurimaguas
Penalties
Christian Caloggero (penalty scored); Eric Chumpitaz (penalty scored); Felipe De La Cruz (penalty scored)	3–0	Jesús Meléndez (penalty missed); John Colán (penalty missed); Luis Carmen (penalty missed)

Estadio Nacional, Lima
Referee: José Arana

== See also ==
- 1996 Torneo Descentralizado
- 1996 Copa Perú
