= 1995 Peruvian Segunda División =

Peruvian Segunda División
- Season: 1995
- Champions: Guardia Republicana
- Relegated: Mixto Estudiantil; Deportivo Municipal (Ch)

The 1995 Peruvian Segunda División, the second division of Peruvian football (soccer), was played by 12 teams. the tournament winner, Guardia Republicana was promoted to the 1996 Torneo Descentralizado. The tournament was played on a home-and-away round-robin basis. Mixto Estudiantil withdrew before the tournament began. All their matches were considered losses by 0-2.

The club Enrique Lau Chun withdrew before the start the season due to financial problems.

== Teams ==
=== Team changes ===
Relegated from 1994 Primera División	Promoted from 1994 Liga Provincial de Lima	Promoted to 1995 Primera División	Relegated to 1995 Copa Perú	Retired
▼ Defensor Lima (16th)	▲ Sport Agustino (1st) ▲ Deportivo Municipal (Chorrillos) (2nd)	▲ Unión Huaral (1st)	▼ José Carlos Mariátegui (11th) ▼ Juventud La Palma (12th)	▼ Enrique Lau Chun (Retired)

=== Stadia and Locations ===
Team	City
Alcides Vigo	Barranco, Lima
América Cochahuayco	San Luis, Lima
Bella Esperanza	Cerro Azul, Lima
Defensor Lima	Breña, Lima
Deportivo Municipal (Chorrillos)	Chorrillos, Lima
Deportivo Zúñiga	La Molina, Lima
Guardia Republicana	La Molina, Lima
Hijos de Yurimaguas	Callao
Lawn Tennis	Jesús María, Lima
Metor Sport	Lima
Mixto Estudiantil	San Martín de Porres, Lima
Sport Agustino	El Agustino, Lima

== League table ==
=== Standings ===
Pos	Team	Pld	W	D	L	GF	GA	GD	Pts	Promotion or relegation
1	Guardia Republicana (C)	22	16	3	3	61	12	+49	51	1996 Primera División
2	Deportivo Zúñiga	22	16	2	4	37	17	+20	50	
3	Lawn Tennis	22	14	7	1	38	12	+26	49	
4	Hijos de Yurimaguas	22	13	5	4	28	14	+14	44	
5	Alcides Vigo	22	12	6	4	39	18	+21	42	
6	Bella Esperanza	22	9	1	12	23	30	−7	28	
7	Meteor Sport	22	6	6	10	26	26	0	24	
8	Defensor Lima	22	6	4	12	23	41	−18	22	
9	Sport Agustino	22	5	6	11	18	35	−17	21	
10	América Cochahuayco	22	4	8	10	27	34	−7	20	
11	Deportivo Municipal (Chorrillos) (R)	22	4	5	13	25	59	−34	17	1996 Copa Perú
12	Mixto Estudiantil (R)	22	0	0	22	0	44	−44	0	1996 Copa Perú

Updated to match(es) played on 1996. Source:
Rules for classification: 1) points; 2) goal difference; 3) number of goals scored.
(C) Champions; (R) Relegated

== See also ==
- 1995 Torneo Descentralizado
- 1995 Copa Perú
