= Percy Aguilar =

Peruvian footballer (born 1965)

Personal information
- Full name: Percy Aguilar Alvarado
- Date of birth: 14 January 1965 (age 61)
- Place of birth: Cusco, Department of Cusco, Peru
- Height: 1.70 m (5 ft 7 in)
- Position: Forward

Senior career*
Years	Team	Apps	(Gls)
1986–1987	Alfonso Ugarte de Puno		
1988–1992	Cienciano		
1993	Alianza		
1994–1995	Ciclista Lima		
1996–1997	Cienciano		

International career
1994	Peru	2	(1)
- * Club domestic league appearances and goals

Percy Aguilar Alvarado (born 14 January 1965) is a Peruvian former footballer. Nicknamed "Chuncho", he played as a forward for Cienciano throughout the 1980s and the 1990s, being the top scorer of all time for the club. He also briefly represented Peru on two occasions in 1994.

== Club career ==
Aguilar made his debut for Alfonso Ugarte de Puno during the 1986 Torneo Descentralizado. He remained with the club for an additional season throughout the following 1987 Torneo Descentralizado before he began to play for Cienciano throughout the remainder of the 1980s and into the early 1990s. Throughout this initial tenure, he scored in the 4–2 victory against Colegio Nacional Iquitos in their last ever encounter on 4 October 1992. He was also part of the attacking formation for the club alongside Néstor Mordini. He also briefly played abroad for Salvadoran club Alianza during the 1993 season for the 1992–93 Primera División de Fútbol Profesional. He also had a brief tenure with Ciclista Lima during the 1994 and 1995 Torneo Descentralizado.

He then returned to Cienciano with Frank Palomino during the 1996 Torneo Descentralizado under manager Freddy Bustamante where he played alongside players such as Juan Carlos Bazalar, Germán Carty, Roger Serrano, Jorge Reyes Flores and Héctor Vega. During his final season on 7 June 1997 in the match against Sporting Cristal, he met a young Leao Butrón in his debut match for the club with the club ending in 1–1 with Aguilar scoring the equalizer himself. His final goal came during a 3–1 home win against Universitario de Deportes.

== International career ==
Aguilar was called up to represent Peru for the 1994 Copa Miami. He made two appearances throughout the tournament, scoring the only goal for Peru against Honduras on 5 May 1994.
