= Germán Pinillos =

Peruvian footballer and manager (born 1972)

Personal information
- Full name: Germán Ernesto Pinillos Rioja
- Date of birth: 6 April 1972 (age 54)
- Place of birth: Callao, Peru
- Height: 1.78 m (5 ft 10 in)
- Position: Midfielder

Senior career*
Years	Team	Apps	(Gls)
1989–1990	Meteor Lima		
1991	Deportivo Zúñiga		
1992–1996	Sporting Cristal		
1997	Universitario	8	(0)
1998–1999	Sport Boys	42	(8)
2000	Sporting Cristal		
2000	Sport Boys	8	(0)
2001	Deportivo Municipal		
2002	Deportivo Aviación		

International career
1992–2000	Peru	14	(2)

Managerial career
- 2012: Cobresol
- 2013: AIPSA FC
- 2014: Alfonso Ugarte (Puno)
- 2015: Sport Victoria
- * Club domestic league appearances and goals

Germán Ernesto Pinillos Rioja (born 6 April 1972) is a Peruvian football manager and former footballer. He currently manages Cobresol in the Torneo Descentralizado.

== Playing career ==
=== Club career ===
Pinillos played for a number of clubs in Peru, including Sporting Cristal and Sport Boys. He won three Peruvian championships with the first club in 1994, 1995 and 1996.

=== International career ===
Pinillos made 14 appearances for the senior Peru national football team.

== Managerial career ==
Germán Pinillos made his managerial debut with Cobresol of Moquegua in the 2012 Peruvian Championship. Two years later, he took charge of Alfonso Ugarte de Puno in the second division, followed by Sport Victoria of Ica in 2015.

== Honours ==
Sporting Cristal

- Torneo Descentralizado (3): 1994, 1995, 1996
