= Jahir Butrón =

Peruvian footballer and manager (born 1975)

Personal information
- Full name: Jahir Butrón Gotuzzo
- Date of birth: 30 October 1975 (age 51)
- Place of birth: Lima, Peru
- Height: 1.86 m (6 ft 1 in)
- Position: Centre-back

Team information
- Current team: Pirata (manager)

Youth career
- 1987-1993: Sporting Cristal

Senior career*
Years	Team	Apps	(Gls)
1994	Sporting Cristal		
1995	Guardia Republicana		
1996	Alianza Atlético		
1997-?	Alcides Vigo		
1998	Lawn Tennis		
2000	Deportivo Pesquero		(3)
2001	Alianza Atlético		(2)
2002	Deportivo Wanka		(2)
2003–2004	Alianza Atlético		
2005–2006	Cienciano		
2007	Total Clean	10	
2007	Sport Ancash	7	
2008–2009	Juan Aurich	57	(3)
2010	CNI	7	(0)
2010–2011	Cienciano	19	(0)
2012–2014	Deportivo Coopsol	0	(0)

Managerial career
- 2014: Deportivo Municipal (assistant)
- 2016: Deportivo Coopsol (assistant)
- 2017: Cultural Santa Rosa
- 2017–2018: Cienciano (assistant)
- 2020–2021: Alianza Atlético
- 2021–2022: Carlos Stein
- 2022: Deportivo Coopsol
- 2023: Juan Aurich
- 2024: Pirata
- 2025–: Pirata
- * Club domestic league appearances and goals

Jahir Butrón Gotuzzo (born 30 October 1975) is a Peruvian football manager and former player who manages Pirata.

Butrón is the older brother of goalkeeper Leao Butrón.

== Playing career ==
A centre-back, Butrón started his football career in the popular youth academy of Sporting Cristal but did not manage to win a starting spot in the senior squad. Then from 1995, he played for Peruvian Second Division side Guardia Republicana. There he won the 1995 Peruvian Second Division and thus promotion to the First Division. Then he spent time playing for clubs such as Alcides Vigo, Lawn Tennis, Deportivo Pesquero, and Deportivo Wanka. During his time with Deportivo Wanka, Butrón scored his first goal in the Peruvian First Division in Round 14 of the 2000 Apertura season. He scored in the 85th minute, and it was the final goal in the 4–2 win at home against FBC Melgar.

In 2001 Butrón played for Alianza Atlético of Sullana. He managed to score the winner in Alianza Atlético's home opener of the 2001 season against Estudiantes de Medicina. The following year he returned to Deportivo Wanka and scored two goals for them in the 2002 season. The first goal salvaged a draw and was scored in the 81st minute away to Coronel Bolognesi for a 3–3 result. The other goal secured the three points against Juan Aurich. The next year he rejoined Alianza Atlético. In the 2003 season Butrón once again managed to score against Estudiantes de Medicina in the 3–1 win at home. Most notably that same season he scored a late equalizer that canceled Antonio Meza Cuadra's early goal away to Peruvian giants Universitario de Deportes for a final 1–1 result.

== Managerial career ==
Having become a coach, he managed Cultural Santa Rosa (now Club Deportivo Los Chankas) in the second division in 2017. He won the second division title with his former playing club, Alianza Atlético, in 2020, the club's centenary year.

In 2021, he took charge of FC Carlos Stein, whom he led to promotion to the first division after a victorious playoff against Deportivo Binacional.

== Honours ==
=== Player ===
Sporting Cristal

- Torneo Descentralizado: 1994

Guardia Republicana

- Peruvian Segunda División: 1995

=== Manager ===
Alianza Atlético

- Liga 2 (Peru): 2020
