= Alex Magallanes =

Peruvian footballer (born 1974)

Personal information
- Full name: Alex Segundo Magallanes Jaimes
- Date of birth: March 1, 1974 (age 52)
- Place of birth: Lima, Peru
- Height: 1.72 m (5 ft 8 in)
- Position: Attacking midfielder

Senior career*
Years	Team	Apps	(Gls)
1993	San Agustín		
1994–1996	Sporting Cristal		
1997	Dundee United	0	(0)
1998	Deportes Temuco	13	(4)
1999	Cobreloa	16	(0)
2000	Deportivo Municipal	17	(3)
2000	Cienciano	15	(2)
2001	Sport Boys	16	(0)
2001	Estudiantes de Med.	20	(1)
2002	Sporting Cristal	21	(1)
2003	Estudiantes de Med.	12	(1)
2004	Unión Huaral	40	(7)
2005–2007	Universitario	73	(9)
2007	Melgar	13	(3)
2008	José Gálvez	25	(0)
2009	Sport Huancayo	26	(4)
2010	Inti Gas Deportes	27	(1)
2011	José Gálvez		
2012–2013	Alfonso Ugarte		

International career
1995–1997	Peru	16	(0)
- * Club domestic league appearances and goals as of 26 November 2011

Alex Segundo Magallanes Jaimes (born March 1, 1974) is a Peruvian retired footballer who played as an attacking midfielder.

== Club career ==
He last played for Alfonso Ugarte de Puno.

== International career ==
Alex Magallanes made 16 appearances for the Peru national football team.

== Honours ==
Sporting Cristal

- Torneo Descentralizado (4): 1994, 1995, 1996, 2002

José Gálvez FBC

- Torneo Intermedio: 2011
- Segunda División Peruana: 2011
