= Flavio Maestri =

Peruvian footballer (born 1973)

Personal information
- Full name: Flavio Francisco Maestri Andrade
- Date of birth: 21 January 1973 (age 53)
- Place of birth: Lima, Peru
- Height: 1.87 m (6 ft 1 1/2 in)
- Position: Striker

Youth career
- 1983–1988: Sporting Cristal

Senior career*
Years	Team	Apps	(Gls)
1989–1996	Sporting Cristal	153	(91)
1996–1997	Hércules Alicante	20	(2)
1998–2001	Universidad de Chile	91	(27)
2002–2004	Sporting Cristal	9	(4)
2003	→ San Luis (loan)	8	(1)
2004	→ Vitória (loan)	6	(2)
2004–2007	Alianza Lima	73	(24)
2005	→ Shanghai The 9 (loan)	18	(2)
2008	→ Sport Boys (loan)	10	(3)
2009	Sporting Cristal	9	(2)
Total		397	(158)

International career
1991–2007	Peru	57	(11)

Managerial career
- 2014: Coronel Bolognesi
- 2022: Peru Olympic
- * Club domestic league appearances and goals

Flavio Francisco Maestri Andrade (born 21 January 1973 in Lima) is a Peruvian former football player.

He is nicknamed The Tank because of his large size. Throughout his career, he has played professional football for numerous teams in Peru, Spain, Mexico, Brazil, China, Chile and has also played for the National team.

== Club career ==
When Flavio Maestri was 10 years old, his father, Edmundo Maestri Baroni, brought him to Sporting Cristal to try out. The youth coach at the time, Alberto Gallardo, admitted him into the club. When Flavio was 16, he signed his first professional contract with Sporting Cristal. At age 18 he debuted with the first team under coach Juan Carlos Oblitas in a match against San Agustin. He scored his first goal that same year in a match against Hijos de Yurimaguas.

Flavio Maestri was part of the team consisting of Roberto Palacios, Nolberto Solano, Julinho, Jorge Soto, Pedro Garay and Julio César Balerio that won the "Tricampeonato" from 1994 to 1996. By age 23, Flavio became an idol for Cristal fans and became an integral member of the team by scoring more than 100 goals.

His good performances caught the attention of Hércules CF and in 1996 he transferred there. He played in Spain until 1998 when Chilean club Universidad de Chile acquired him. Flavio played with Chilean club until 2001.

In 2002, Maestri came back to Sporting Cristal after six years outside of Peru. He was loaned out to San Luis F.C. but came back to Sporting Cristal to win another championship, the Torneo Apertura 2003. Flavio was than loaned out again, this time to Brazilian club Vitória.

Flavio returned to Peru and did not renew his contract with Sporting Cristal. Alianza Lima signed him and Flavio became part of their team in 2004. In 2005 again Maestri went abroad, to Chinese club Shanghai The 9 on loan. After his loan in China he returned to Alianza Lima where he became National Champions in 2006. At the end of 2007, Alianza Lima did not renew their contract with Maestri. Flavio decided to sign with Sport Boys but due to injury he did not play often.

In 2009, he returned once again to Sporting Cristal.

== International career ==
Maestri has made 57 appearances for the Peru national football team, 24 of those in FIFA World Cup qualification matches.

He is also responsible for Peru winning the only important title for the team during the last decade which was the 1999 Kirin Cup, where they shared first place with Belgium. Maestri scored the only goal on the sixth minute against Belgium which later ended in a tie.

== Managerial career ==
Maestri was named manager at Coronel Bolognesi in June 2014.

== Career statistics ==
=== International ===
Appearances and goals by national team and year
National team	Year	Apps	Goals
Peru	1991	3	1
Peru	1992	1	0
Peru	1993	12	2
Peru	1994	2	0
Peru	1995	2	3
Peru	1996	7	0
Peru	1997	9	2
Peru	1998	1	0
Peru	1999	6	1
Peru	2001	6	1
Peru	2003	2	0
Peru	2004	5	1
Peru	2007	1	0
Total		57	11

Scores and results table. Peru's goal tally first:

List of international goals scored by Flavio Maestri
No.	Date	Venue	Opponent	Score	Result	Competition
1.	08.07.91	Estadio Municipal, Concepción, Chile	Chile	1–2	2–4	1991 Copa América
2.	11.06.93	Estadio Melgar, Arequipa, Peru	Venezuela	2–0	3–1	Friendly
3.	11.06.93	Estadio Melgar, Arequipa, Peru	Venezuela	3–0	3–1	Friendly
4.	19.04.95	Estadio Nacional, Lima, Peru	Chile	1–0	6–0	Friendly
5.	19.04.95	Estadio Nacional, Lima, Peru	Chile	2–0	6–0	Friendly
6.	19.04.95	Estadio Nacional, Lima, Peru	Chile	4–0	6–0	Friendly
7.	12.01.97	Estadio Nacional, Lima, Peru	Chile	1–0	2–1	1998 FIFA World Cup qualification
8.	20.08.97	Estadio La Carolina, Barinas, Venezuela	Venezuela	3–0	3–0	1998 FIFA World Cup qualification
9.	30.05.99	Nishikyogoku Stadium, Kyoto, Japan	Belgium	1–0	1–1	1999 Kirin Cup
10.	27.03.01	Estadio Nacional, Lima, Peru	Chile	1–0	3–1	2002 FIFA World Cup qualification
11.	12.07.04	Estadio Mansiche, Trujillo, Peru	Colombia	2–2	2–2	2004 Copa América

== Honours ==
=== Club ===
Sporting Cristal

- Peruvian Primera División (5): 1991, 1994, 1995, 1996, 2002

Universidad de Chile

- Chilean Primera División (2): 1999, 2000
- Copa Chile (2): 1998, 2000

Alianza Lima

- Peruvian Primera División (2): 2004, 2006

=== Individual honours ===
Award	Year
Top Goalscorer Peruvian Primera División	1994
Player of the Year Peru	1994
