= 1996 FBC Melgar season =

FBC Melgar
1996 season
- Stadium: Estadio Mariano Melgar
- Torneo Descentralizado: Torneo Descentralizado League: Nn (3°); Nn National (6°)
Home colours	Away colours	Third colours

The 1996 FBC Melgar season were the Eighty-Second (82.º) of the club from its foundation in 1915, Twenty-Seven (27) participations in the top-flight of Peruvian Primera División (of 80 Editions) with denomination Torneo Descentralizado. In Previous Season the club qualified as 7th Place of 1995 Torneo Descentralizado.

Melgar were a of sixteen (16) clubs in the 'Thirty-First edition (31.º) Torneo Descentralizado, the competition most important of the Peruvian football. The club played the Peruvian Primera División.

== Torneo Descentralizado ==
=== Torneo Descentralizado League ===
Pos	Team	Pld	W	D	L	GF	GA	GD	Pts
10	La Loretana	30	11	4	15	39	59	-20	37
11	FBC Melgar	30	9	9	12	36	35	+1	36
12	Alianza Atlético	30	10	6	14	40	51	-11	36

== See also ==
- FBC Melgar
- 1996 Torneo Descentralizado
