= 1996 Sporting Cristal season =

Sporting Cristal
1996 season
- Stadium: San Martín de Porres, Lima
- Torneo Descentralizado: Torneo Descentralizado League: First (1°) Champion; Champion National (1°)
Home colours	Away colours	Third colours

The 1996 Sporting Cristal season were the Forty-First (41.º) of the club from its foundation in 1955, Forty-One (41) participations consecutives in the top-flight of Peruvian Primera División (of 80 Editions) with denomination Torneo Descentralizado. In Previous Season the club qualified as Champions National 1st Place of the 1995 Torneo Descentralizado.

Sporting Cristal were a of sixteen (16) clubs in the Thirty-First edition (31.º) Torneo Descentralizado, the competition most important of the Peruvian football. The club played the Peruvian Primera División and Copa Libertadores for Sixteenth (16th) Time. Sporting Cristal won their 13th Torneo Descentralizado Title.

== Torneo Descentralizado ==
=== Torneo Descentralizado League ===
Pos	Team	Pld	W	D	L	GF	GA	GD	Pts
1	Sporting Cristal	30	22	3	5	73	26	+47	69
2	Alianza Lima	30	17	9	4	68	23	+45	60
3	Universitario	30	16	10	4	39	20	+19	58

== See also ==
- Club Sporting Cristal
- 1996 Torneo Descentralizado
