= Ysrael Zúñiga =

Peruvian footballer (born 1976)

Personal information
- Full name: Herlyn Ysrael Zuñiga Yáñez
- Date of birth: 27 August 1976 (age 50)
- Place of birth: Lima, Peru
- Height: 1.78 m (5 ft 10 in)
- Position: Striker

Youth career
- 1991–1994: Sporting Cristal

Senior career*
Years	Team	Apps	(Gls)
1995	Guardia Republicana	19	(28)
1996 –1997	Coronel Bolognesi	22	(23)
1997	Sport Agustino	24	(26)
1998	Coronel Bolognesi	18	(25)
1999	Melgar	39	(32)
2000–2002	Coventry City	30	(3)
2002–2003	Estudiantes (LP)	6	(0)
2003	Cruz Azul Hidalgo	4	(0)
2003–2004	Universitario	45	(15)
2005	Atlético Universidad	21	(3)
2005–2006	Sporting Cristal	36	(7)
2007	Melgar	38	(19)
2008–2009	Bursaspor	19	(6)
2009	Melgar	34	(14)
2010–2012	Juan Aurich	80	(21)
2013–2018	Melgar	155	(41)
Total		556	(259)

International career
1999–2007	Peru	21	(3)

Managerial career
- 2018–: FBC Melgar Youth Team (assistant coach)
Medal record
Guardia Republicana
Winner	Peruvian Segunda División	1995
Coronel Bolognesi
Runner-up	Copa Perú	1998
Sporting Cristal
Winner	Peruvian League	2005
Juan Aurich
Winner	Peruvian League	2011
Melgar
Winner	Peruvian League	2015
Runner-up	Peruvian League	2016
- * Club domestic league appearances and goals

Herlyn Ysrael Zúñiga Yáñez (born 27 August 1976) is a Peruvian dentist and former footballer who played as a striker for the Peru national team and for clubs including Coventry City, Estudiantes and Melgar. Since retirement, Zúñiga has reverted to dentistry in his homeland, which he obtained qualifications for concurrently during his tenure at Sporting Cristal.

== Club career ==
Zúñiga initially trained as a dental technician before deciding to become a professional footballer at the relatively late age of 22. He gained some international fame after scoring a league-record equalling 32 goals for Melgar in his first season in the Primera División Peruana in 1999. His goalscoring success prompted English Premier League club Coventry City to purchase him for £750,000 in February 2000. However, he was unable to find any form in England; scoring three goals in 30 appearances spread over two and a half years with Coventry before he was released in the summer of 2002.

After leaving Coventry he joined Argentine club Estudiantes, but again struggled to recapture his scoring form. Zúñiga returned to his homeland following the conclusion of his spell in Argentina to join Sporting Cristal, a club he spent time at as a teenager before leaving the game to study to be a dental worker.

== International career ==
He won 21 caps and scored 3 goals for the Peru.

He was recalled against Ecuador in June 2007.

=== International ===
As of 9 July 2007

Peru
Year	Apps	Goals
1999	7	1
2000	10	1
2001	0	0
2002	0	0
2003	1	0
2004	1	1
2005	0	0
2006	0	0
2007	2	0
Total	21	3

== Honours ==
=== Club ===
Guardia Republicana

- Peruvian Segunda División:1995

Sporting Cristal

- Peruvian Primera División: 2005

Juan Aurich

- Peruvian First Division: 2011

FBC Melgar

- Peruvian First Division: 2015
