= 1995 Sporting Cristal season =

Sporting Cristal
1995 season
- Stadium: San Martín de Porres, Lima
- Torneo Descentralizado: Torneo Descentralizado League: First (1°) Champion; Octogonal Final: First (1°) Champion; Champion National (1°)
Home colours	Away colours	Third colours

The 1995 Sporting Cristal season were the Fortieth (40.º) of the club from its foundation in 1955, Forty (40) participations consecutives in the top-flight of Peruvian Primera División (of 79 Editions) with denomination Torneo Descentralizado. In Previous Season the club qualified as Champions National 1st Place of the 1994 Torneo Descentralizado.

Sporting Cristal were a of sixteen (16) clubs in the Thirtieth edition (30.º) Torneo Descentralizado, the competition most important of the Peruvian football. The club played the Peruvian Primera División and Copa Libertadores for Fifteenth (15th) Time. Sporting Cristal won their 12th Torneo Descentralizado Title.

== Torneo Descentralizado ==
=== Torneo Descentralizado League ===
Pos	Team	Pld	W	D	L	GF	GA	GD	Pts
1	Sporting Cristal	30	21	5	4	76	27	+49	68
2	Alianza Lima	30	22	1	7	53	20	+33	67
3	Universitario	30	19	6	5	54	26	+28	63

== See also ==
- Club Sporting Cristal
- 1995 Torneo Descentralizado
