= 1995 FBC Melgar season =

FBC Melgar
1995 season
- Stadium: Estadio Mariano Melgar
- Torneo Descentralizado: Torneo Descentralizado League: Nn (3°); Pre-Liguilla: Match A Nn National (6°)
Home colours	Away colours	Third colours

The 1995 FBC Melgar season were the Eighty-First (81.º) of the club from its foundation in 1915, Twenty-Six (26) participations in the top-flight of Peruvian Primera División (of 79 Editions) with denomination Torneo Descentralizado. In Previous Season the club qualified as 8th Place of 1994 Torneo Descentralizado.

Melgar were a of sixteen (16) clubs in the Thirtieth edition (30.º) Torneo Descentralizado, the competition most important of the Peruvian football. The club played the Peruvian Primera División.

== Torneo Descentralizado ==
=== Torneo Descentralizado League ===
Pos	Team	Pld	W	D	L	GF	GA	GD	Pts
5	Deportivo Sipesa	30	13	11	6	51	22	+29	50
6	FBC Melgar	30	13	8	9	41	39	+2	47
7	Deportivo Municipal	30	11	8	11	43	40	+3	41

== See also ==
- FBC Melgar
- 1995 Torneo Descentralizado
