= 1994 Sporting Cristal season =

Sporting Cristal
1994 season
- Stadium: San Martín de Porres, Lima
- Torneo Descentralizado: Torneo Apertura: First (1°) Group A and Champion; Torneo Descentralizado League: First (1°) Champion; Champion National (1°)
Home colours	Away colours	Third colours

The 1994 Sporting Cristal season were the Thirty-Nineth (39.º) of the club from its foundation in 1955, Thirty-Nine (39) participations consecutives in the top-flight of Peruvian Primera División (of 78 Editions) with denomination Torneo Descentralizado. In Previous Season the club qualified as 3rd Place of the 1993 Torneo Descentralizado.

Sporting Cristal were a of sixteen (16) clubs in the Twenty-Nineth edition (29.º) Torneo Descentralizado, the competition most important of the Peruvian football. The club played the Peruvian Primera División for Fifteenth (15th) Time and Copa CONMEBOL for First (1st) and One-time only. Sporting Cristal won their 11th Torneo Descentralizado Title.

== Torneo Descentralizado ==
=== Torneo Apertura (Group A) ===
Pos	Team	Pld	W	D	L	GF	GA	GD	Pts
1	Sporting Cristal	7	5	0	2	23	5	+18	10
2	León de Huánuco	7	4	2	1	11	8	+3	10
3	Alianza Lima	7	3	3	1	15	11	+4	9

== See also ==
- Club Sporting Cristal
- 1994 Torneo Descentralizado
