= Roger Serrano =

Peruvian footballer (born 1970)

Personal information
- Full name: Roger Alberto Serrano Ruíz
- Date of birth: 23 July 1970 (age 56)
- Place of birth: Chepén, Peru
- Height: 1.75 m (5 ft 9 in)
- Position: Midfielder

Senior career*
Years	Team	Apps	(Gls)
1991–1993	León de Huánuco		
1993	Universitario		
1994	Ciclista Lima		
1995	Deportivo Sipesa		
1996	Sport Boys		
1997–1998	Sporting Cristal		
1999–2000	Cienciano		
2000	Deportivo Municipal	17	(1)
2001	Alianza Lima		
2002	Cienciano		

International career
1996–2000	Peru	16	(0)
- * Club domestic league appearances and goals

Roger Alberto Serrano Ruíz (born 23 July 1970) is a former Peruvian footballer.

== Club career ==
Serrano has played for most of his career with Universitario de Deportes, Sport Boys, Sporting Cristal, Alianza Lima and Cienciano in the Primera División Peruana.

== International career ==
Serrano made 16 appearances for the senior Peru national football team from 1996 to 2000.
