= Julinho (footballer, born 1965) =

Brazilian footballer (born 1965)

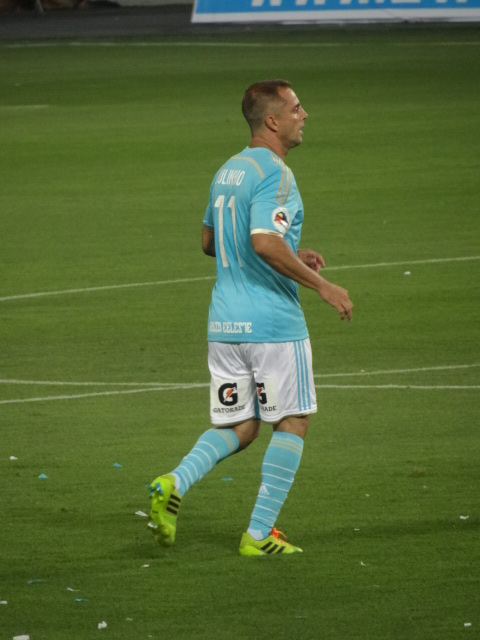

Personal information
- Full name: Julio César de Andrade Moura
- Date of birth: 31 October 1965 (age 60)
- Place of birth: Salvador, Bahia, Brazil
- Height: 1.70 m (5 ft 7 in)
- Position: Striker

Senior career*
Years	Team	Apps	(Gls)
1982–1983	Vitória		
1984–1986	Flamengo		
1987	Avaí		
1988–1989	Treze		
1990	Fortaleza		
1991–1992	Defensor Lima	59	(17)
1993–2004	Sporting Cristal	376	(135)

International career
1996–1997	Peru	12	(2)
- * Club domestic league appearances and goals as of October 28, 2008

Julio César de Andrade Moura, more commonly known as Julinho (born October 31, 1965, in Salvador, Bahia, Brazil) is a retired football striker from Brazil, who obtained Peruvian nationality. He played in various teams in Brazil but became famous playing with Peruvian team Sporting Cristal.

== Profile ==
Julinho first played professional football for Vitória, team which he is a fan of, in 1982. He has played for several teams in Brazil including Flamengo, Avaí, Treze and Fortaleza.

In 1991, he was offered a job to play for Defensor Lima, despite knowing nothing about the team or Peruvian football in general; he accepted the offer for the salary. After two successful seasons with Defensor Lima, he was brought by Sporting Cristal in 1993.

With Sporting Cristal, he won the Peruvian First Division in 1993, 1994, 1995, and 2002. He also finished second place in the same competition with Cristal in 1997, 1998, 2000 and 2003. He was part of the Sporting Cristal team that were runner up to the 1997 Copa Libertadores. He has become an idol to Sporting Cristal fans in his ten-year career with Cristal.

Julinho made twelve appearances for the Peru national football team from 1996 to 1997.

== Statistics ==
Club performance			League		Cup		Continental		Total	
Season	Club	League	Apps	Goals	Apps	Goals	Apps	Goals	Apps	Goals
Brazil			League		Copa do Brasil		South America		Total	
1982	Vitória	??								
Brazil			League		Copa do Brasil		South America		Total	
1984	Flamengo	Campeonato Brasileiro Série A								
Brazil			League		Copa do Brasil		South America		Total	
1988	Avaí	??								
Brazil			League		Copa do Brasil		South America		Total	
1989	Treze	??								
Brazil			League		Copa do Brasil		South America		Total	
1990	Fortaleza	??								
Peru			League		Cup		South America		Total	
1991	Defensor Lima	Primera División Peruana	34	8	-	-	-	-	34	8
1992	Defensor Lima	Primera División Peruana	25	9	-	-	-	-	25	9
Peru			League		Cup		South America		Total	
1993	Sporting Cristal	Primera División Peruana	40	18	-	-	5	2	45	20
1994	Sporting Cristal	Primera División Peruana	25	13	-	-	4	1	29	14
1995	Sporting Cristal	Primera División Peruana	34	23	-	-	10	4	44	27
1996	Sporting Cristal	Primera División Peruana	20	9	-	-	8	2	28	11
1997	Sporting Cristal	Primera División Peruana	24	9	-	-	14	3	38	12
1998	Sporting Cristal	Primera División Peruana	26	8	-	-	5	0	31	8
1999	Sporting Cristal	Primera División Peruana	41	14	-	-	10	0	51	14
2000	Sporting Cristal	Primera División Peruana	21	5	-	-	3	0	24	5
2001	Sporting Cristal	Primera División Peruana	33	15	-	-	10	1	45	16
2002	Sporting Cristal	Primera División Peruana	32	4	-	-	5	2	37	6
2003	Sporting Cristal	Primera División Peruana	3	0	-	-	3	1	6	1
2004	Sporting Cristal	Primera División Peruana	0	0	-	-	0	0	0	0
Total	Brazil									
Total	Peru		358	135	-	-	77	16	435	151
Total	TOTAL									

=== Individual awards ===
Award	Year
Footballer of the Year - Peru	1995
Foreign Player of the Year - Peru	1995
Top Goalscorer - Peru	1995
