= 1994 Copa Perú =

Copa Perú
- Season: 1994
- Champions: Atlético Torino
- Top goalscorer: Richard Vinatea (6)

The 1994 Copa Perú season (Spanish: Copa Perú 1994) was a promotion tournament of Peruvian football league system.

In this tournament after many qualification rounds, each one of the 24 departments in which Peru is politically divided, qualify a team. Those teams plus the team relegated from First Division are divided in 6 groups by geographical proximity and each group winner goes to the Final round, staged in Lima (the capital).

The champion was promoted to 1995 Torneo Descentralizado.

== Finalists teams ==
The following list shows the teams that qualified for the Final Stage.

Department	Team	Location
Ancash	José Gálvez	Chimbote
Arequipa	Aurora	Arequipa
Cusco	Deportivo Garcilaso	Cusco
Junín	Cultural Hidro	La Oroya
Piura	Atlético Torino	Talara
Ucayali	La Loretana	Pucallpa

== National stage ==
=== First Round ===
Team 1	Agg.	Team 2	1st leg	2nd leg
Atlético Torino	2–1	Boca Juniors	1–1	1–0
Octavio Espinosa	0–3	José Gálvez	0–2	0–1
La Loretana	2–1	Atlético Nacional	1–0	1–1
Social Magdalena	2–2	Deportivo Garcilaso	0–0	2–2
Aurora	3–3	Alfonso Ugarte	2–1	1–2
Cultural Hidro	–	UNHEVAL	–	–

==== Tiebreaker ====
Team 1	Score	Team 2
Aurora	6–1	Alfonso Ugarte
Deportivo Garcilaso	–	Social Magdalena

== Final stage ==
=== Standings ===
Pos	Team	Pld	W	D	L	GF	GA	GD	Pts	Promotion
1	Atlético Torino (C)	5	3	2	0	9	4	+5	8	Promoted to 1995 Torneo Descentralizado
2	Aurora	5	3	1	1	8	4	+4	7	
3	José Gálvez	5	2	2	1	11	4	+7	6	
4	La Loretana	5	2	2	1	6	5	+1	6	
5	Cultural Hidro	5	1	0	4	6	14	−8	2	
6	Deportivo Garcilaso	5	0	1	4	5	14	−9	1	

(C) Champions

==== Results ====
===== Round 1 =====
15 January 1995	Atlético Torino	2–1	Cultural Hidro	Nacional, Lima

15 January 1995	Aurora	4–0	Deportivo Garcilaso	Nacional, Lima

15 January 1995	José Gálvez	0–0	La Loretana	Nacional, Lima

===== Round 2 =====
18 January 1995	La Loretana	2–1	Deportivo Garcilaso	Nacional, Lima

18 January 1995	José Gálvez	6–1	Cultural Hidro	Nacional, Lima

18 January 1995	Atlético Torino	0–0	Aurora	Nacional, Lima

===== Round 3 =====
22 January 1995	Cultural Hidro	1–0	Deportivo Garcilaso	Nacional, Lima

22 January 1995	Atlético Torino	1–0	José Gálvez	Nacional, Lima

22 January 1995	Aurora	1–0	La Loretana	Nacional, Lima

===== Round 4 =====
25 January 1995	José Gálvez	2–2	Deportivo Garcilaso	Nacional, Lima

25 January 1995	Aurora	3–1	Cultural Hidro	Nacional, Lima

25 January 1995	Atlético Torino	1–1	La Loretana	Nacional, Lima

===== Round 5 =====
29 January 1995	La Loretana	3–2	Cultural Hidro	Nacional, Lima

29 January 1995	Atlético Torino	5–2	Deportivo Garcilaso	Nacional, Lima

29 January 1995	José Gálvez	3–0	Aurora	Nacional, Lima

== See also ==
- 1994 Torneo Descentralizado
- 1994 Peruvian Segunda División
