= Cerro Azul, Peru =

Cerro Azul
- Populated centre and minor port
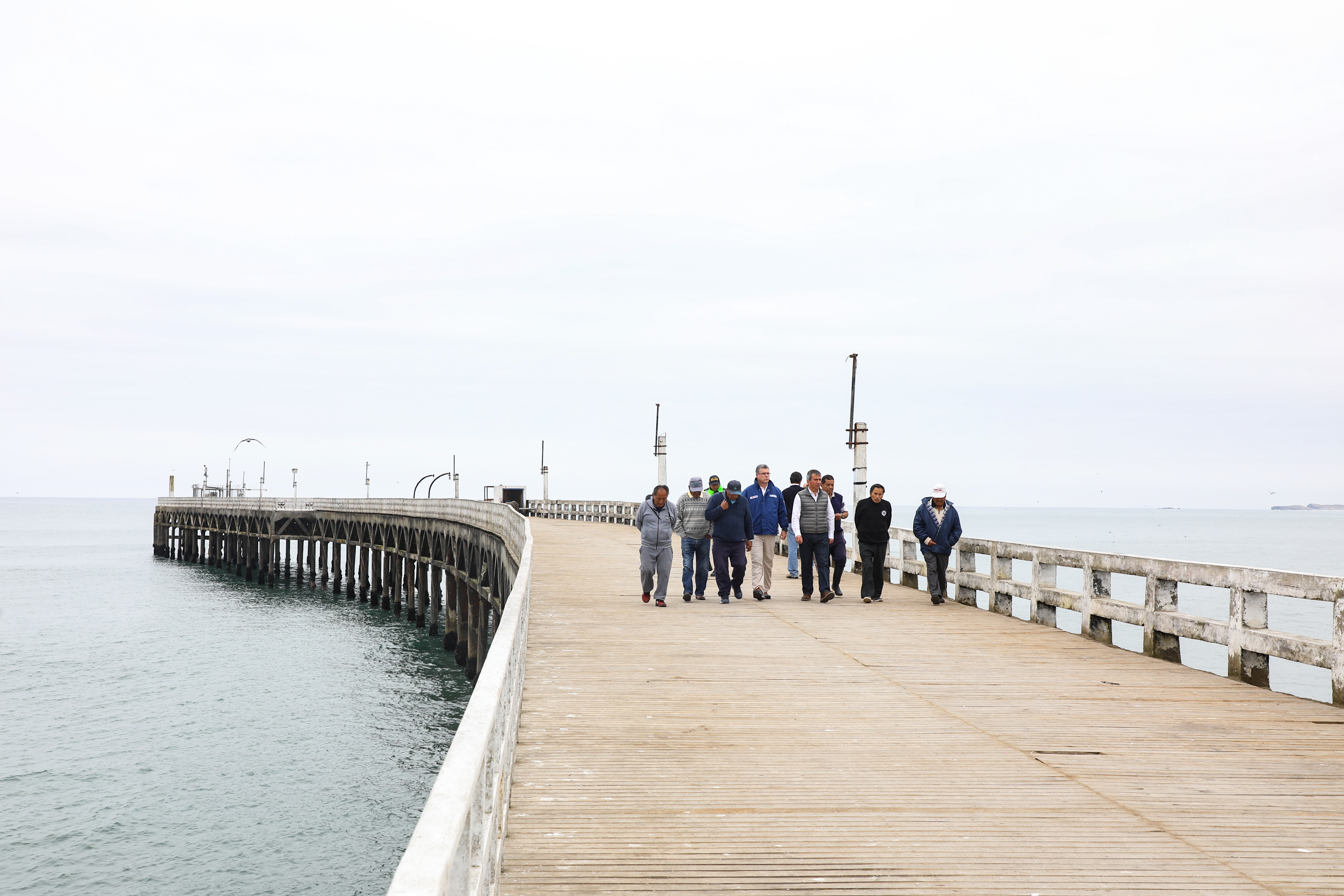
- The pier in 2018

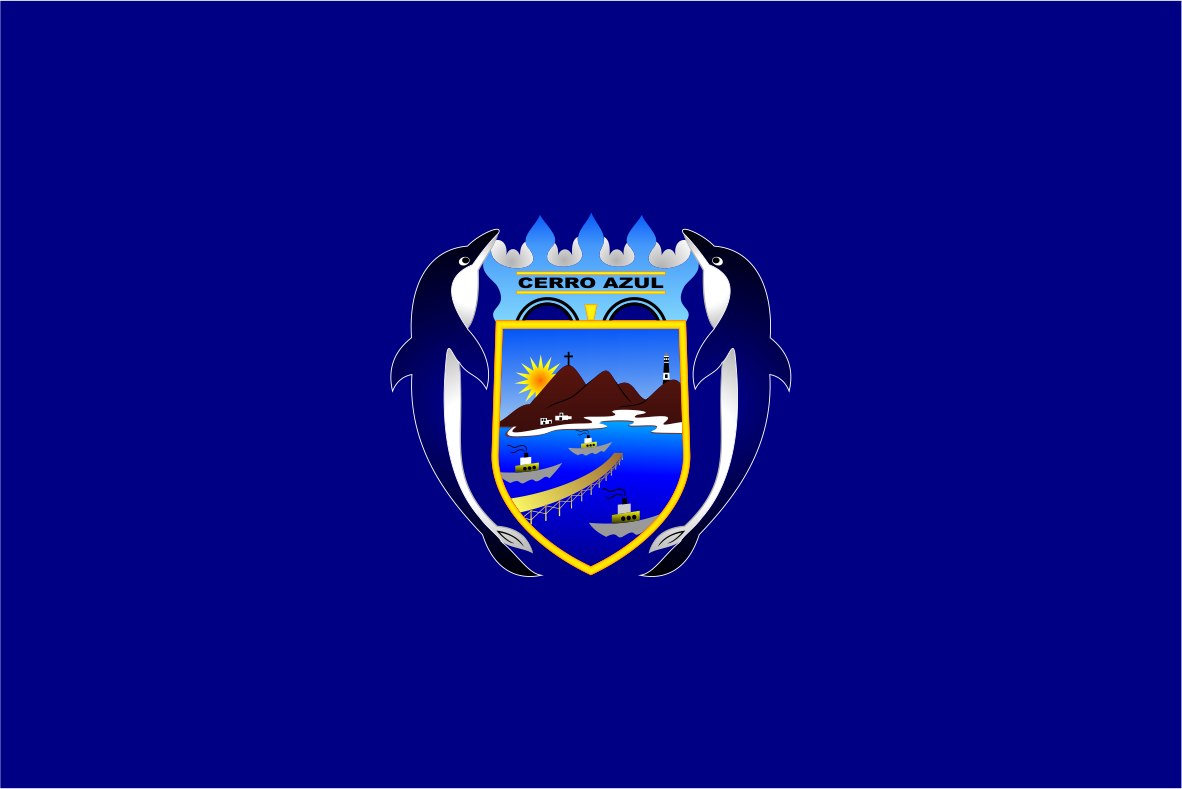
- Flag Coat of arms

- Location within Peru
- Coordinates: 13°01′57″S 76°29′12″W
- Country: Peru
- Department: Lima
- Province: Cañete
- District: Cerro Azul
- Founded: August 16, 1921

Government
  - Mayor: José Pain García

Area
  - Total: 105.17 km^{2} (40.61 sq mi)
- Elevation: 3 m (9.8 ft)

Population (2005 census)
  - Total: 6,491
  - Density: 61.72/km^{2} (159.9/sq mi)
- Time zone: UTC-5 (PET)
- Website: municerroazul.gob.pe

Cerro Azul (lit. 'Blue Hill') is a populated centre, minor port and the capital of the district of the same name in Cañete, a province of the department of Lima, Peru. Located 131 km south of Lima, the fishing village and former commercial port is frequently visited in the summer, and is known as a surfing hotspot.

== Etymology ==
According to historian Juan Luis Orrego, the name of the village (lit. 'Blue Hill') might be traced back to Spanish chronicler Pedro Cieza de León, who wrote about a fortress that took on a blue hue when seen from the sea due to its green paint. Orrego also cites anthropologist Alfred Kroeber and physician Ernst Middendorf, who considered that the seaside hills, when seen from afar, took on a blue hue due to their air plants.

== History ==
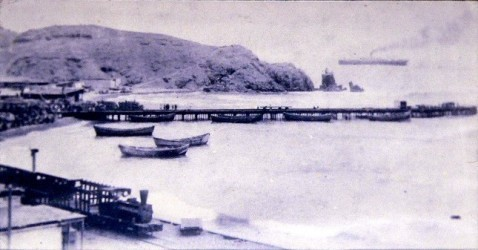
Arrival of the Sakura Maru in 1899.

The area was first inhabited by the Huarco (also Warku), a kingdom contemporaneous with the Chimú culture to the north. The town was subdued by the Inca Pachacútec who ordered to build a stone fortress—Fortaleza de Cerro Azul—with steps down to the sea in honour of his victory and a symbol of his absolute power. This fort was as grand and magnificent as the Sacsayhuaman fortress, according to historians such as Pedro Cieza de León. The fortress was severely damaged under the reign of Francisco de Toledo, with its structural stones being repurposed.

Under the Spanish, its coast saw several naval battles and excursions, including that of Joris van Spilbergen in 1615. These battles led to the sinking of two ships (a galleon and a patache) near the coast of Cerro Azul.

In 1830 a decree was issued, which temporarily enabled the port for the coasting trade, i.e. to allow landlocked products in the valley of Cañete, as well as the production of the guano islands nearby. This led to the construction of several buildings by the owners of the nearby haciendas, serving as lodging establishments for the people working at the port. The port's defensive wall was destroyed in 1881, during the War of the Pacific, and a number of Japanese families (including the Maeda, Watanabe, Hirakawa, and Takase families, who would settle there) arrived to the port in 1903. In 1920, sugarcane production increased and its current port was built in 1925.

The renowned quality of its waves is mentioned in the 1962 Beach Boys' song Surfin' Safari. However, the quality of the waves changes seasonally and from year to year, as the sand and stones that make up the beach are chronically withdrawn by the sea to form a bank where the waves break.

The village was declared a minor port (puerto menor) by Juan Velasco Alvarado's government in 1972, with commerce decreasing afterwards.

The village was quite considerably damaged in the 2007 earthquake that shook much of the southern coast of Peru.

The village has come to depend more heavily on tourism than on fishing.

== Landmarks ==
South of the pier is the area known as Puerto Viejo (lit. 'old port'), where all the holiday homes are and where most of the surfing takes place (left breaks). To the north of the pier, the beach is much longer, less curved and much sandier. There are no holiday homes on it and in the winter is empty. During the summer, it is popular with campers and day-trippers. It is possible to surf here too, when the swell is high, particularly adjacent to the pier, where the waves are fast and the rides tend to be short.

Cerro Azul's main feature is the pier which was built by a British company around 1900 for the export of locally grown cotton. The pier has been disused for over 60 years and is now frequented by fishermen and tourists and is one of the main tourists attractions.

The village also has an attractive main square and the remains of Pre-Inca mud buildings, half buried by sand between two hills which are made from the blue rock that gives the village its name. The other hill features a derelict lighthouse from the days when the area functioned as a port. It sits above craggy, vertical, dangerous cliffs, where birds in the area make their nests. Of note is the Inca tern, a bird endemic to the Humboldt Current, which sweeps the Peruvian coast. Other wildlife of note commonly seen in the area: porpoises, pelicans, sea lions, herons and, on rare occasions, sharks. The village prides itself in catching the largest shark in Peruvian history (in 1989), a 5m long great white. Behind the village, across the Pan-American Highway, are fields and winding valleys in the foothills of the Andes.

The pre-Columbian site known as the Ciudadela El Huarco is located at Camacho and Centinela hills.

== See also ==
- Máncora
