= 1996 Copa Perú =

Copa Perú
- Season: 1996
- Champions: José Gálvez
- Top goalscorer: Alejandro Cipriano (5)

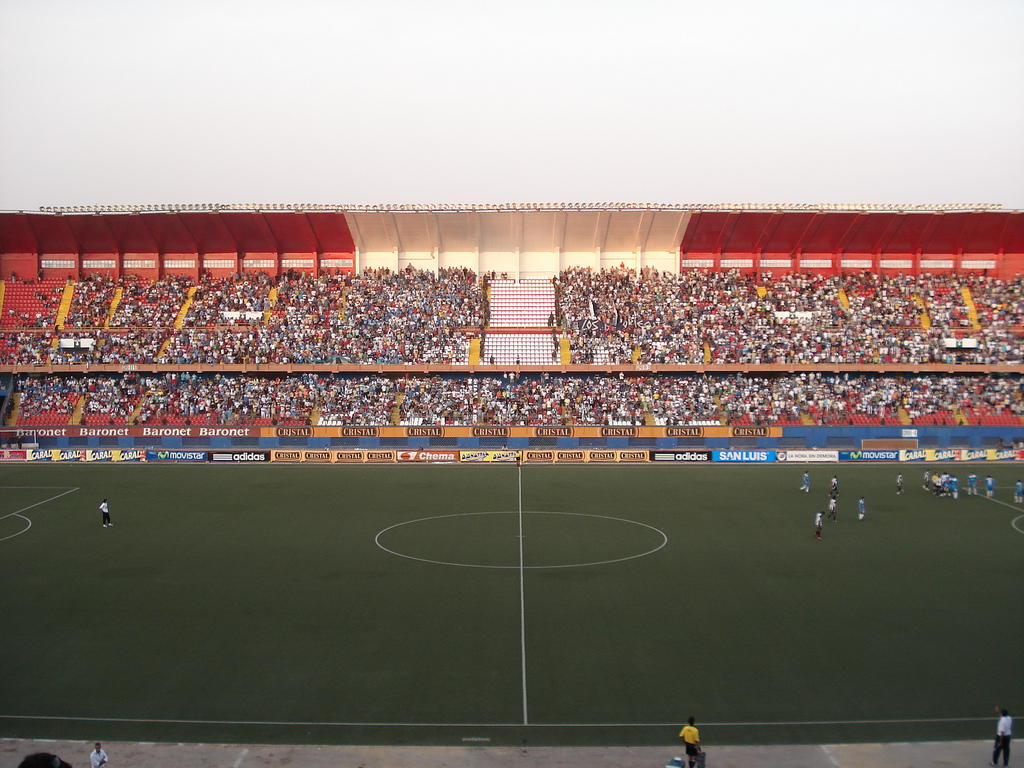
Sporting Cristal Vs Alianza Lima

The 1996 Copa Perú season (Spanish: Copa Perú 1996) was a promotion tournament of Peruvian football league system.

In this tournament after many qualification rounds, each one of the 24 departments in which Peru is politically divided, qualify a team. Those teams plus the team relegated from First Division are divided in 6 groups by geographical proximity and each group winner goes to the Final round, staged in Lima, the national capital.

The champion was promoted to 1997 Torneo Descentralizado.

== Finalists teams ==
The following list shows the teams that qualified for the Regional Stage.

Department	Team	Location
Amazonas	Sachapuyos	Amazonas
Ancash	José Gálvez	Chimbote
Apurímac	Gigantes del Cenepa	Andahuaylas
Arequipa	Piérola	Arequipa
Ayacucho	Deportivo Huáscar	Ayacucho
Cajamarca	UTC	Cajamarca
Callao	Olímpico Bella Unión	Callao
Cusco	Deportivo Garcilaso	Cusco
Huancavelica	7 de Agosto	Huancavelica
Huánuco	León de Huánuco	Huánuco
Huánuco	Unión Naranjillo	Huánuco
Ica	Estudiantes de Medicina	Ica
Junín	Cultural Hidro	Junín

Department	Team	Location
La Libertad	Carlos A. Mannucci	Trujillo
Lambayeque	Mariscal Sucre	Ferreñafe
Lima	Contumazá Repcel	Lima
Loreto	CNI	Iquitos
Madre de Dios	Estudiantes Unidos	Puerto Maldonado
Moquegua	Atlético Huracán	Moquegua
Pasco	Unión Social Oxapampa	Pasco
Piura	I.M.I.	Talara
Puno	Deportivo Universitario	Puno
San Martín	El Tumi	Tarapoto
Tacna	Coronel Bolognesi	Tacna
Tumbes	Independiente Aguas Verdes	Tumbes
Ucayali	San Martín de Porres	Pucallpa

== Regional stage ==
=== Region I ===
Region I includes qualified teams from Cajamarca, Lambayeque, Tumbes and Piura region.

Pos	Team	Pld	W	D	L	GF	GA	GD	Pts	Qualification	UTC	IND	SUC	IMI
1	UTC	6	3	2	1	8	3	+5	11	Final Stage		2–0	2–0	2–0
2	Independiente Aguas Verdes	6	3	1	2	11	11	0	10		1–2			
3	Mariscal Sucre	6	2	2	2	7	8	−1	8		0–0			
4	I.M.I.	6	1	1	4	7	11	−4	4		1–1	5–3		

Legend: Blue = home team win; Yellow = draw; Red = away team win.

=== Region II ===
Region II includes qualified teams from Ancash, Callao, Ica, La Libertad and Lima region.

Pos	Team	Pld	W	D	L	GF	GA	GD	Pts	Qualification	GAL	CAM	EST	OLI	REP
1	José Gálvez	8	6	1	1	19	5	+14	19	Final Stage		2–1	4–0	4–0	2–0
2	Carlos A. Mannucci	6	3	1	2	8	6	+2	10		2–2				
3	Estudiantes de Medicina	5	3	1	1	8	3	+5	10		2–0				
4	Olímpico Bella Unión	6	1	1	4	2	9	−7	4		0–2		1–1		
5	Contumazá Repcel	5	1	0	4	3	10	−7	3		0–3				

Legend: Blue = home team win; Yellow = draw; Red = away team win.

=== Region III ===
Region III includes qualified teams from Amazonas, Loreto, San Martín and Ucayali region.

==== Semifinals ====
Team 1	Agg.	Team 2	1st leg	2nd leg
CNI	7–4	San Martín de Porres	3–0	4–4
Sachapuyos	–	El Tumi	–	1–0

==== Final ====
Team 1	Agg.	Team 2	1st leg	2nd leg
CNI	2–0	Sachapuyos	1–0	1–0

=== Region IV ===
Region IV includes qualified teams from Huancavelica, Huánuco, Junín and Pasco region.

Pos	Team	Pld	W	D	L	GF	GA	GD	Pts	Qualification	LEO	NAR	HID	OXA	7DA
1	León de Huánuco	8	5	2	1	15	7	+8	17	Final Stage		1–1	3–1	1–0	4–0
2	Unión Naranjillo	7	4	2	1	14	8	+6	14		1–1				
3	Cultural Hidro	7	3	0	4	8	10	−2	9		3–1				
4	Unión Social Oxapampa	7	3	0	4	8	9	−1	9		0–2	2–4			3–1
5	7 de Agosto	7	1	0	6	8	19	−11	3		1–2			1–3	

Legend: Blue = home team win; Yellow = draw; Red = away team win.

==== Tiebreaker ====
Team 1	Score	Team 2
León de Huánuco	2–2 (6–4 p)	Unión Naranjillo

=== Region V ===
Region V includes qualified teams from Apurímac, Ayacucho, Cusco and Madre de Dios region.

Pos	Team	Pld	W	D	L	GF	GA	GD	Pts	Qualification	GIG	GAR	HUA	EST
1	Gigantes del Cenepa	6	4	2	0	10	2	+8	14	Final Stage		1–1	3–0	3–0
2	Deportivo Garcilaso	6	3	2	1	9	6	+3	11		1–1			2–1
3	Deportivo Huáscar	6	2	1	3	6	8	−2	7		0–1	1–0		
4	Estudiantes Unidos	6	0	1	5	2	11	−9	1		0–1			

Legend: Blue = home team win; Yellow = draw; Red = away team win.

=== Region VI ===
Region VI includes qualified teams from Arequipa, Moquegua, Puno and Tacna region.

Pos	Team	Pld	W	D	L	GF	GA	GD	Pts	Qualification	BOL	UNI	PIE	HUR
1	Coronel Bolognesi	6	3	1	2	9	6	+3	10	Final Stage		3–1	3–0	1–0
2	Deportivo Universitario	6	3	1	2	4	4	0	10		1–0			
3	Piérola	6	2	1	3	4	6	−2	7		3–1			0–0
4	Atlético Huracán	6	1	3	2	2	3	−1	6		1–1			

Legend: Blue = home team win; Yellow = draw; Red = away team win.

==== Tiebreaker ====
Team 1	Score	Team 2
Coronel Bolognesi	4–1	Deportivo Universitario

== Final stage ==
=== Standings ===
Pos	Team	Pld	W	D	L	GF	GA	GD	Pts	Promotion
1	José Gálvez (C)	5	4	1	0	15	4	+11	13	Promoted to 1997 Torneo Descentralizado
2	UTC	5	3	0	2	11	9	+2	9	
3	Coronel Bolognesi	5	2	1	2	8	6	+2	7	
4	Gigantes del Cenepa	5	2	0	3	10	13	−3	6	
5	CNI	5	2	0	3	8	11	−3	6	
6	León de Huánuco	5	1	0	4	3	12	−9	3	

(C) Champions

=== Results ===
==== Round 1 ====
19 January 1997	León de Huánuco	1–0	Coronel Bolognesi	Nacional, Lima

19 January 1997	José Gálvez	1–0	UTC	Nacional, Lima

19 January 1997	CNI	3–1	Gigantes del Cenepa	Nacional, Lima

==== Round 2 ====
22 January 1997	José Gálvez	1–1	Coronel Bolognesi	Nacional, Lima

22 January 1997	Gigantes del Cenepa	3–0	León de Huánuco	Nacional, Lima

22 January 1997	UTC	3–2	CNI	Nacional, Lima

==== Round 3 ====
26 January 1997	UTC	2–1	León de Huánuco	Nacional, Lima

26 January 1997	Coronel Bolognesi	3–0	Gigantes del Cenepa	Nacional, Lima

26 January 1997	José Gálvez	3–1	CNI	Nacional, Lima

==== Round 4 ====
29 January 1997	Gigantes del Cenepa	4–2	UTC	Nacional, Lima

29 January 1997	Coronel Bolognesi	3–0	CNI	Nacional, Lima

29 January 1997	José Gálvez	5–0	León de Huánuco	Nacional, Lima

==== Round 5 ====
2 February 1997	CNI	2–1	León de Huánuco	Nacional, Lima

2 February 1997	UTC	4–1	Coronel Bolognesi	Nacional, Lima

2 February 1997	José Gálvez	5–2	Gigantes del Cenepa	Nacional, Lima

== See also ==
- 1996 Torneo Descentralizado
- 1996 Peruvian Segunda División
