= 1995 Copa Perú =

Copa Perú
- Season: 1995
- Champions: La Loretana
- Top goalscorer: Roberto Valenzuela (4)

The 1995 Copa Perú season (Spanish: Copa Perú 1995) was a promotion tournament of Peruvian football league system.

In this tournament after many qualification rounds, each one of the 24 departments in which Peru is politically divided, qualify a team. Those teams plus the team relegated from First Division are divided in 6 groups by geographical proximity and each group winner goes to the Final round, staged in Lima, the national capital.

The champion was promoted to 1996 Torneo Descentralizado.

== Departmental Stage ==
The following list shows the teams that qualified for the Regional Stage.

Department	Team	Location
Amazonas	Sachapuyos	Amazonas
Ancash	José Gálvez	Chimbote
Apurímac	Deportivo Municipal (Pacucha)	Andahuaylas
Apurímac	Deportivo Educación	Abancay
Arequipa	Sportivo Huracán	Arequipa
Ayacucho	Deportivo Huáscar	Ayacucho
Cajamarca	UTC	Cajamarca
Cusco	Ingeniería Civil	Cusco
Huancavelica	Diablos Rojos	Huancavelica
Huánuco	Juan Bielovucic	Huánuco
Ica	Juan Mata	Nasca
Junín	Deportivo Municipal (El Tambo)	El Tambo
La Libertad	Deportivo Marsa	Tayabamba
La Libertad	Carlos A. Mannucci	Trujillo

Department	Team	Location
Lambayeque	Sport Boys	Tumán
Loreto	José Pardo	Iquitos
Madre de Dios	Estudiantes Unidos	Puerto Maldonado
Moquegua	Atlético Huracán	Moquegua
Pasco	Nueva Berna	Pasco
Piura	Túpac Amaru	Sullana
Puno	Deportivo Universitario	Puno
San Martín	El Tumi	Tarapoto
Tacna	Coronel Bolognesi	Tacna
Tumbes	Alianza Tumbesina	Tumbes
Ucayali	La Loretana	Pucallpa

== Final stage ==
=== Standings ===
Pos	Team	Pld	W	D	L	GF	GA	GD	Pts	Promotion
1	La Loretana (C)	5	2	3	0	7	5	+2	9	Promoted to 1996 Torneo Descentralizado
2	Sportivo Huracán	5	2	2	1	7	4	+3	8	
3	Deportivo Marsa	5	1	4	0	10	6	+4	7	
4	Deportivo Municipal (Pacucha)	5	1	3	1	8	10	−2	6	
5	UTC	5	1	3	1	8	10	−2	6	
6	Diablos Rojos	5	0	1	4	7	12	−5	1	

(C) Champions

==== Round 1 ====
14 January 1996	La Loretana	1–1	Deportivo Municipal (Pacucha)	Nacional, Lima

14 January 1996	Sportivo Huracán	1–1	UTC	Nacional, Lima

14 January 1996	Deportivo Marsa	2–2	Diablos Rojos	Nacional, Lima

==== Round 2 ====
17 January 1996	Sportivo Huracán	4–1	Deportivo Municipal (Pacucha)	Nacional, Lima

17 January 1996	Deportivo Marsa	5–1	UTC	Nacional, Lima

17 January 1996	La Loretana	3–2	Diablos Rojos	Nacional, Lima

==== Round 3 ====
21 January 1996	Deportivo Municipal (Pacucha)	2–1	Diablos Rojos	Nacional, Lima

21 January 1996	La Loretana	1–1	UTC	Nacional, Lima

21 January 1996	Sportivo Huracán	0–0	Deportivo Marsa	Nacional, Lima

==== Round 4 ====
24 January 1996	Deportivo Municipal (Pacucha)	2–2	UTC	Nacional, Lima

24 January 1996	Sportivo Huracán	2–1	Diablos Rojos	Nacional, Lima

24 January 1996	La Loretana	1–1	Deportivo Marsa	Nacional, Lima

==== Round 4 ====
28 January 1996	UTC	3–1	Diablos Rojos	Nacional, Lima

28 January 1996	Deportivo Marsa	2–2	Deportivo Municipal (Pacucha)	Nacional, Lima

28 January 1996	La Loretana	1–0	Sportivo Huracán	Nacional, Lima

== See also ==
- 1995 Torneo Descentralizado
- 1995 Peruvian Segunda División
