= Aurora Miraflores =

Peruvian football club

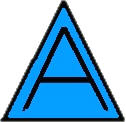
- Full name: Club Aurora Miraflores
- Nickname: Los rayados de Miraflores
- Founded: January 2, 1958
- Ground: Manuel Bonilla Stadium, Lima
- Capacity: 6,500
- Chairman: Ernesto Roth
- Manager: David Pacheco
- League: Copa Perú
Home colours	Away colours

Aurora Miraflores is a Peruvian football club, playing in the city of Lima, Peru.

The club was founded in 1958 and plays in the Copa Perú, which is the third division of the Peruvian league.

== History ==
Founded in 1958 by Ernesto Roth and his brother Luis Roth, the club has played at the second level of Peruvian football on four occasions, from 1988 until 1991, when it was relegated.

In 2002, the club merged with the Olímpico Somos Perú, and participated in the Segunda Division Peruana as Olímpico Aurora Miraflores.

== Honours ==
=== Regional ===
- Liga Mayor de Fútbol de Lima:

Runner-up (1): 1979

- Liga Provincial de Lima:

Winners (1): 1975

- Liga de los Balnearios del Sur:

Winners (1): 1974

- Liga Distrital de Miraflores:

Winners (1): 2001

== See also ==
- List of football clubs in Peru
- Peruvian football league system
