= Hijos de Yurimaguas =

- Full name: Club Hijos de Yurimaguas
- Founded: 16 March 1967; 59 years ago
- Ground: Estadio Facundo Ramírez Aguilar, Callao
- Capacity: 5,000
- League: Copa Perú
Home colours	Away colours

Hijos de Yurimaguas is a Peruvian football club, playing in the Ventanilla District, in Callao.

== History ==
Founded in 1967, the club won the second-division championship in 1990 and earned promotion to the first division the following year under the guidance of Chilean coach Miguel Ángel Arrué. It competed in the Peruvian top flight for two consecutive seasons, in 1991 and 1992—having changed its name to Deportivo Yurimaguas at the start of 1992—but was relegated at the end of that season.

After finishing as second-division runners-up in 1994 and 1996, the club reverted to its original name, Hijos de Yurimaguas, and secured a second title in 1998 with Tito Chumpitaz as coach. However, the team lost a playoff match against Deportivo Municipal, missing the chance to return to the first division for a third time.

Hijos de Yurimaguas remained in the second division until 2001, when it was relegated. Since then, it has played in the district leagues of Callao. In 2015, a new club—Club Deportivo Yurimaguas—was founded by Omar Olórtegui, a supporter of the original Hijos de Yurimaguas; however, there is no institutional link between the two clubs.

== Honours ==
=== National ===
- Peruvian Segunda División:

Winners (2): 1990, 1998
Runner-up (2): 1994, 1996

=== Regional ===
- Liga Departamental del Callao:

Winners (2): 1975, 1986

== Managers ==
- (Peru) José del Castillo (1988)
- (Chile) Miguel Ángel Arrué (1990–1992)
- (Peru) Alfonso Huapaya 1992)
- (Peru) Juan Manuel Toyco (1992)
- (Peru) Rafael Castañeda (1992)
- (Peru) Juan Forero (1994)
- (Peru) Rafael Castañeda (1994)
- (Peru) Rigoberto Obregón (1995)
- (Peru) Luis Roth (1996)
- (Peru) Alfonso Reyna (1996)
- (Peru) Rafael Castañeda (1996)
- (Peru) Tito Chumpitaz (1996–1998)
- (Peru) Pedro Sandoval (1999)
- (Peru) Tito Chumpitaz (1999)
- (Peru) Benjamín Rodríguez (2000–2001)
- (Peru) Hugo Castillo (2001)
- (Peru) Daniel Urizaga (2001)

== See also ==
- List of football clubs in Peru
- Peruvian football league system
