= Club Estudiantes Lau Chun =

Peruvian football club

Enrique Lau Chun
- Full name: Club Estudiantes Lau Chun
- Nickname: Lau Chun
- Founded: 8 December 1978; 47 years ago (as Club Enrique Lau Chun)
- Ground: Estadio Unión Barranco, Lima
- Capacity: 6,000
- League: Copa Perú
Home colours

Estudiantes Lau Chun is a Peruvian football club originally located in the district of La Molina (Lima), before moving to Barranco.

== History ==
Founded by Jorge Lau Kong, president of the Lau Chun bookstore company, who used the name of his father, Enrique Lau Chun, to create a football club that initially played in the amateur league of the La Molina district, in Lima, with players from the Lau Chun bookstore factory.

The club was promoted to the second division in 1988. They won the second division championship in 1991 but were unable to reach the first division due to a reduction in the number of teams in the top tier. In 1993, they relinquished their second-division status to Centro Iqueño, with a promise of a merger between the two clubs that ultimately never materialized. Lau Chun continued to play in the second division until 1994, but financial difficulties forced them to sell their license to Lawn Tennis FC.

The club reappeared in 2013 under the name Club Estudiantes Lau Chun, playing in the Barranco district league.

== Honours ==
=== National ===
- Peruvian Segunda División:

Winners: 1991

=== Regional ===
- Región IX Metropolitana:

Winners: 1987 (Serie A)

== Notable players ==
Eduardo Aguilar, Francisco Ñiquen (goalkeeper), Alfonso Dulanto, Eloy Ortiz, Adrián Gatti and Rodolfo Miñán passed through the club when it was playing in the second division.

== See also ==
- List of football clubs in Peru
- Peruvian football league system
