= Deportivo Zúñiga =

Zúñiga
- Full name: Club Deportivo Zúñiga
- Founded: January 1981
- League: Copa Perú
Home colours

Zúñiga is a Peruvian football club, playing in the city of Lima, Peru.

The club is the biggest of Lima city, and one of the biggest in Lima Province.

The club were founded 1981 and plays in the Copa Perú, which is the third division of the Peruvian league.

Their current manager is Brian Bertie.

== History ==
The club has played at the second level of Peruvian football on several occasions, from 1988 until 1998 Torneo Descentralizado, when it was relegated to the Copa Perú.

The club has produced a limited number of players that have participated in the top flight although many have made their name in the Copa Perú.

== Honours ==
=== National ===
- Peruvian Segunda División:
  - Runner-up (2): 1991, 1995

=== Regional ===
- Liga Distrital de La Molina:
  - Winners (1): 2026
  - Runner-up (1): 2017

== See also ==
- List of football clubs in Peru
- Peruvian football league system
