= Bella Esperanza =

Peruvian football club

- Full name: Club Deportivo Bella Esperanza
- Nickname: Los Tiburones Rojos
- Founded: June 25, 1915; 111 years ago
- Chairman: Harold Rivas
- League: Copa Perú
Home colours	Away colours

Bella Esperanza (Club Deportivo Bella Esperanza) is a football club, playing in Cerro Azul, Cañete, Lima, Peru, South America.

== History ==
The Club Deportivo Bella Esperanza was founded on June 25, 1915. It subsequently became affiliated with the Liga Distrital de Cañete, where it took part in official competitions during its early years.

In 1984, Bella Esperanza qualified for the final stage of the Copa Perú, which was held entirely at the Estadio Nacional in Lima. The team faced Los Espartanos de Pacasmayo, Alianza Atlético de Sullana, Universitario de Tacna, Guardia Republicana of Lima, and Deportivo Educación of Abancay. The club finished in sixth and last place in the final hexagonal, with two points.

In 1988, under the presidency of José Lara Quispe, Bella Esperanza earned promotion to the Peruvian Segunda División. In its first season in the division, the 1989 Segunda División season, the club reached the final league stage. During the 1990s, Bella Esperanza received support from Alianza Lima, which loaned some of its youth players to the club. In 1997, Bella Esperanza finished as runner-up in the Segunda División, one point behind Lawn Tennis, which secured promotion to the Peruvian Primera División.

In the 2002 championship, Bella Esperanza was relegated after finishing the tournament with only five points from 30 matches, returning to the Copa Perú. In 2003, the club began its participation in the Liga Departamental de Lima of the Copa Perú and reached the semifinals, where it was eliminated by Nicolás de Piérola of Huacho, which subsequently won the departmental title.

On August 30, 2026, Bella Esperanza defeated Arsenal Lawn Tennis 1–0 at the Municipal Stadium of Mala, becoming champions of the Lima Departmental League and securing qualification for the National Stage of the Copa Perú.

== Honors ==
=== Senior titles ===
Keys

- Record
- ^{(s)} Shared record

Type	Competition	Titles	Runner-up	Winning years	Runner-up years
National (League)	Segunda División	—	1	—	1991
Regional (League)	Liga Departamental de Lima	5	—	1983, 1985, 1986, 1987, 2026	—
Regional (League)	Liga Provincial de Cañete	4	1	1983, 2024, 2025, 2026	2010
Regional (League)	Liga Distrital de Cerro Azul	10	5	2010, 2012, 2013, 2015, 2016, 2018, 2019, 2024, 2025, 2026	2008, 2011, 2014, 2017, 2023
Regional (League)	Liga Distrital de San Vicente de Cañete	2	—	1930, 1983	—

== See also ==
- List of football clubs in Peru
- Peruvian football league system
