= Ciclista Lima Association =

Ciclista Lima
- Full name: Club Ciclista Lima Association (Lima Cyclist Association Club)
- Nickname: "Los Tallarineros" (Tagliatelle)
- Founded: 22 December 1896
- Ground: Estadio Nacional
- Capacity: 45,574
- Chairman: Carlos Chamochumbi
- League: Copa Perú
Home colours	Away colours

Ciclista Lima Association is a Peruvian football club, playing in the city of Lima.

The club was a prominent contender in the early years of football, particularly during the amateur era. Today, however, it is no longer present in the top tier of Peruvian football and competes in the Copa Perú.

The club's traditional colors are black and white, which were adopted following its merger with Association Football Club. These colors are reflected in both its playing kit and its crest.

== History ==
=== Foundation and early years ===
The club was founded on Jesús Nazareno Street, in the arcades of Lima's Plaza Mayor, under the name Unión Ciclista Peruana, with Pedro de Osma serving as its first president. Its early activities were limited to cycling and later baseball until 1927, when it merged with Association Football Club, founded in 1897 and considered the oldest Peruvian club established exclusively for football. Following this merger, Club Ciclista Lima Association began to gain prominence in the football scene.

The club made its debut in the top flight in the 1927 Championship, finishing in last place; however, it retained its status as there was no relegation that season.

=== International tours ===
Argentine coaches Adolfo Pedernera and Carlos Aldabe were among the most notable foreign managers to lead Ciclista Lima.

Between November 1928 and April 1929, the club embarked on a tour of Ecuador, Colombia, and Venezuela. In the latter country, it played four matches against local representative sides, winning all of them. In Colombia, it took part in what is considered the first international football match played in that country, defeating Sporting de Barranquilla 1–0 at the Estadio Moderno.

In April 1931, club director Augusto Brondy arranged for a new tour across northern South America after obtaining authorization from the Peruvian Football Federation. The team departed on 21 April aboard the ship Santa Inés bound for Guayaquil. However, a change in the Federation's leadership led to the revocation of the permit, leaving the club unable to officially play abroad. Despite this setback and growing financial difficulties, the team managed to play matches against Rocafuerte of Guayaquil and a local representative side, winning both convincingly.

Ciclista arrived in Cali, where it was able to arrange several matches, albeit under unfavorable conditions—for instance, only 60% of the gate receipts went to the players. Due to the limited financial success, the club decided to sustain itself in a "circus-like" fashion, traveling from town to town and reaching remote locations such as Cartago, Palmira, Manizales, Buga, and Pereira, all of which witnessed Ciclista Lima's tour. In some cases, improvised football pitches were set up for their matches.

While in Barranquilla, the Peruvian players were forced to pawn their valuables to settle their lodging expenses. These were later recovered after a successful turnout in Santa Marta against Colombian champions Deportivo Samarios, drawing the first match and winning the second.

To continue financing its tour, Ciclista requested further advances. The team then arrived in Venezuela, where it faced several local representative sides, employing an original promotional strategy in which the players paraded through the streets accompanied by a marching band. In Caracas, the Venezuelan president, General Juan Vicente Gómez, was invited to attend one of the matches. Upon learning of the Peruvians’ financial difficulties, he donated 30,000 bolívares and covered their expenses during their stay in the country.

Ciclista then headed to the Caribbean, passing through the Antilles and Curaçao, where they were caught in a storm that nearly caused a shipwreck. On the island of Trinidad, the team recorded a resounding 7–0 victory over a local side. Exactly one year after their departure, the Lima-based club decided to return home. Upon arrival, all players had been sanctioned by the Federation; however, when they appeared at the stadium and were warmly received by the crowd, the Peruvian Football Federation decided to lift the suspension.

=== Between First and Second Division ===
In 1937, the club was relegated from the División de Honor to the Liga Provincial de Lima, returning to the top flight the following year. In 1940, it finished bottom and was relegated again, subsequently competing in the Liga Regional de Lima y Callao until the creation of the Peruvian Segunda División in 1943. The club won that tournament the following year but lost in the promotion playoff (as there was no direct promotion) against Sporting Tabaco, the bottom-placed team from the First Division.

In 1946, it once again won the Second Division title, and this time, with direct promotion in place, secured its return to the First Division for the 1947 season after seven years away. The club was relegated again in 1948, but thanks to the efforts of its directors, it returned to the top flight in 1950. During that period, notable players such as Juan Emilio Salinas and Miguel Loayza, known as "El Maestrito," stood out, with the latter soon being transferred to play in Argentina.

In the 1965 Peruvian Primera División, the club was relegated to the Second Division. It competed there until the 1972 season, when the Peruvian Football Federation dissolved the category.

The following year, it played in the Liga Provincial de Lima, winning its group and qualifying for the Promotion Playoff to the Peruvian Primera División, where it finished in third place. In the subsequent years, the club competed in the Liga Distrital de San Isidro. In 1983, it was relegated in the second district division and was suspended from competition for one year.

=== Return to the First Division ===
In 1991, the club merged with Club Defensor Kiwi, allowing it to compete in the Peruvian Segunda División under the name Defensor Kiwi–Ciclista Lima. The team won the title in 1993 and returned to the 1994 Torneo Descentralizado.

It became one of the main contenders in the Apertura Tournament that opened the 1994 professional season, finishing as runners-up and qualifying for the following year's Copa CONMEBOL, where it was eliminated in the first round by Chilean side Cobreloa.

Due to low attendance in Lima, the club relocated its home base to Chincha, where results did not meet expectations. The 1996 season marked the end of this historic institution, as it was relegated for the final time.

=== Present day ===
Currently, the club competes in the Liga Distrital de Chorrillos.

== Honours ==
=== Senior titles ===
Keys

- Record
- ^{(s)} Shared record

Type	Competition	Titles	Runner-up	Winning years	Runner-up years
National (League)	Segunda División	3	2	1944, 1946, 1993	1949, 1992
Half-year / Short; Tournament (League)	Torneo Apertura	—	1	—	1994
Regional (League)	Primera División Amateur de Lima	2	—	1937, 1973 Serie A	—
Regional (League)	Primera División Regional de Lima y Callao	1	—	1942	—
Regional (League)	Segunda División Distrital de Chorrillos	—	1	—	2022 Serie A
Regional (League)	Tercera División Distrital de Chorrillos	2	—	2011, 2013	—

== Performance in CONMEBOL competitions ==
- Copa CONMEBOL: 1 appearance

1995: First Round

== See also ==
- List of football clubs in Peru
- Peruvian football league system
