= 1996 Torneo Descentralizado =

Torneo Descentralizado
- Season: 1996
- Dates: 4 March 1996 – 27 October 1996
- Champions: Sporting Cristal; 13th Primera División title
- Runner up: Alianza Lima
- Relegated: Aurich–Cañaña; Ciclista Lima; Guardia Republicana; San Agustín
- Copa Libertadores: Sporting Cristal; Alianza Lima
- Copa CONMEBOL: Universitario
- Top goalscorer: Waldir Sáenz; Adrián Czornomaz (20 goals each)

The 1996 Torneo Descentralizado was the 81st season of the top category of Peruvian football. A total of 16 teams competed in the tournament. Sporting Cristal won its 13th first division title, completing a string of 3 consecutive titles starting in 1994. The feat is known as a tricampeonato and was previously accomplished only by Alianza Lima.

== Changes from 1995 ==
- The tournament would be played like in 1994, where the champion was crowned after the first stage of the tournament and the second berth to the Copa Libertadores was determined by an end-of-season Liguilla featuring 4 teams.
- Four teams were relegated instead of the customary two. Two teams from the Copa Perú and the Segunda División were promoted in their place.

== Teams ==
=== Team changes ===
Promoted from 1995 Segunda División	Promoted from 1995 Copa Perú	Relegated from 1995 Primera División
▲ Guardia Republicana (1st)	▲ La Loretana (1st)	▼ Unión Huaral (15th) ▼ León de Huánuco (16th)

=== Stadia locations ===
Locations of the 1996 Primera División teams

Team	City	Stadium	Capacity
Alianza Atlético	Sullana	Campeones del 36	8,000
Alianza Lima	Lima	Alejandro Villanueva	35,000
Atlético Torino	Talara	Campeonísimo	8,000
Aurich–Cañaña	Chiclayo	Elías Aguirre	24,500
Ciclista Lima	Lima	Nacional	45,750
Cienciano	Cusco	Garcilaso	42,056
Deportivo Municipal	Lima	Nacional	45,750
Deportivo Pesquero	Chimbote	Manuel Gómez Arellano	25,000
Guardia Republicana	Lima	Nacional	45,750
La Loretana	Pucallpa	Aliardo Soria	15,000
Melgar	Arequipa	Mariano Melgar	20,000
San Agustín	Lima	Nacional	45,750
Sport Boys	Callao	Miguel Grau	18,000
Sporting Cristal	Lima	San Martín de Porres	15,000
Unión Minas	Cerro de Pasco	Daniel Alcides Carrión	8,000
Universitario	Lima	Teodoro Lolo Fernández	15,000

== League table ==
The first stage of the season was played as a double round-robin tournament. Sporting Cristal as champions qualified for the 1997 Copa Libertadores. Alianza Lima directly advanced to the end-of-season Liguilla and received a bonus point for placing second. The teams that placed 3 to 8 advanced to a preliminary round.

=== Standings ===
Pos	Team	Pld	W	D	L	GF	GA	GD	Pts	Qualification or relegation
1	Sporting Cristal (C)	30	22	3	5	73	26	+47	69	1997 Copa Libertadores
2	Alianza Lima	30	17	9	4	68	23	+45	60	Liguilla Pre-Libertadores with 1 bonus point
3	Universitario	30	16	10	4	39	20	+19	58	Pre-Liguilla
4	Sport Boys	30	13	14	3	49	26	+23	53	Pre-Liguilla
5	Atlético Torino	30	14	7	9	33	33	0	49	Pre-Liguilla
6	Cienciano	30	11	8	11	32	36	−4	41	Pre-Liguilla
7	Deportivo Pesquero	30	9	10	11	27	33	−6	37	Pre-Liguilla
8	Unión Minas	30	9	10	11	35	42	−7	37	Pre-Liguilla
9	Deportivo Municipal	30	10	7	13	44	57	−13	37	
10	La Loretana	30	11	4	15	39	59	−20	37	
11	Melgar	30	9	9	12	36	35	+1	36	
12	Alianza Atlético	30	10	6	14	40	51	−11	36	
13	Aurich–Cañaña (R)	30	9	6	15	30	37	−7	33	1997 Copa Perú
14	Ciclista Lima (R)	30	6	11	13	36	51	−15	29	1997 Segunda División
15	Guardia Republicana (R)	30	7	8	15	30	45	−15	29	1997 Segunda División
16	San Agustín (R)	30	4	4	22	27	62	−35	16	1997 Segunda División

Updated to match(es) played on 1996. Source:
Rules for classification: 1) points; 2) goal difference; 3) number of goals scored.
(C) Champions; (R) Relegated

== Results ==
Home \ Away	AAS	ALI	TOR	AUR	CIC	CIE	MUN	PES	GUA	LOR	MEL	AGU	SBA	CRI	MIN	UNI
Alianza Atlético		2–3	3–0	1–3	3–1	2–0	5–2	1–1	0–0	2–1	2–0	2–1	2–2	1–2	3–1	3–2
Alianza Lima	6–0		1–0	5–2	2–0	3–1	2–2	2–2	1–0	5–0	1–1	6–0	2–2	0–0	3–0	0–0
Atlético Torino	0–0	1–1		1–0	2–1	1–0	2–1	2–1	2–0	3–0	2–1	2–0	1–0	0–2	2–0	0–0
Aurich–Cañaña	1–0	0–1	1–2		1–1	1–0	1–2	0–1	0–0	0–1	1–2	2–0	2–2	2–1	1–1	0–1
Ciclista Lima	2–1	0–1	1–1	1–1		2–0	2–1	1–1	3–5	4–1	0–1	1–4	2–2	2–4	1–0	1–1
Cienciano	1–1	2–1	3–0	1–0	1–0		2–0	2–0	2–2	1–1	1–1	3–0	1–0	3–1	2–1	0–0
Deportivo Municipal	2–2	1–5	3–1	2–3	2–2	0–1		1–0	3–1	1–4	3–0	2–1	2–2	0–2	1–0	0–0
Deportivo Pesquero	2–1	0–2	2–1	1–1	0–0	2–1	0–1		0–0	1–0	1–1	1–0	1–1	3–0	1–1	0–3
Guardia Republicana	1–0	0–5	1–4	1–0	1–1	0–0	2–2	0–1		1–0	1–0	5–1	0–1	0–2	2–2	1–2
La Loretana	2–0	1–6	1–1	1–2	3–2	3–1	1–2	2–1	2–1		1–0	3–2	2–1	0–2	1–0	1–1
Melgar	1–0	1–0	0–0	1–2	4–1	1–1	5–1	0–0	3–1	4–0		2–0	0–0	1–1	1–1	0–1
San Agustín	0–1	0–1	0–1	1–2	1–1	2–0	1–2	1–2	1–3	4–3	2–1		1–1	0–3	0–0	1–2
Sport Boys	2–0	0–0	4–1	2–1	1–0	2–0	0–0	3–1	2–0	5–2	3–2	1–1		3–1	5–0	0–0
Sporting Cristal	4–1	2–1	2–0	2–0	6–2	6–0	5–2	3–1	1–0	2–0	3–0	3–1	0–0		7–1	1–2
Unión Minas	5–0	1–2	4–0	1–0	0–0	2–2	3–2	1–0	2–0	1–1	2–1	3–1	0–0	0–1		1–1
Universitario	3–1	1–1	0–0	1–0	0–1	1–0	2–1	1–0	2–1	3–1	3–1	3–0	1–2	0–2	2–0	

Updated to match(es) played on 1996. Source: RSSSF Peru 1996
Legend: Blue = home team win; Yellow = draw; Red = away team win.

== Pre-Liguilla ==
Team 1	Agg.	Team 2	1st leg	2nd leg
Unión Minas	0–3	Universitario	0–0	0–3
Deportivo Pesquero	3–1	Sport Boys	2–0	1–1
Cienciano	5–2	Alianza Atlético	5–1	0–1

=== First leg ===
17 November 1996	Unión Minas	0–0	Universitario	Estadio Daniel Alcides Carrión, Cerro de Pasco
14:00				Attendance: 5,965; Referee: José Arana

17 November 1996	Deportivo Pesquero	2–0	Sport Boys	Estadio Manuel Gómez Arellano, Chimbote
15:30	Luis Molina 24' (o.g.); Chiquinho 54'			Attendance: 3,500; Referee: Alberto Tejada

17 November 1996	Cienciano	5–1	Atlético Torino	Estadio Garcilaso, Cusco
15:30	Percy Aguilar 2'; Néstor Márquez 21' 36'; Jorge Parihuana 74'; Jair Vásquez 87'		Carlos Guillén 46'	Attendance: 5,144; Referee: Luis Seminario

=== Second leg ===
23 November 1996	Universitario	3–0	Unión Minas	Estadio Teodoro Lolo Fernández, Lima
15:30	Adrián Czornomaz 2'; José Espinoza 40'; Gabriel Gonzales 72'			Attendance: 3,766; Referee: Ángel Ziani

24 November 1996	Sport Boys	1–1	Deportivo Pesquero	Estadio Miguel Grau, Callao
12:30	Juan Carlos Bazalar 73'		Isidro Fuentes 61'	Attendance: 5,000; Referee: Víctor Mayorga

24 November 1996	Atlético Torino	1–0	Cienciano	Estadio Campeonisimo, Talara
12:00	Luisinho 59'			Attendance: 1,000; Referee: César Córdova

Universitario, Deportivo Pesquero, and Cienciano qualified for the Liguilla Pre-Libertadores.

== Liguilla Pre-Libertadores ==
All matches were played in Lima.

=== Standings ===
Pos	Team	Pld	W	D	L	GF	GA	GD	Pts	Qualification or relegation	ALI	UNI	PES	CIE
1	Alianza Lima	3	2	1	0	8	2	+6	8 (Note: Alianza Lima obtained 1 point for finishing second in the Torneo Descentralizado.)	1997 Copa Libertadores			4–1	4–1
2	Universitario	3	2	1	0	8	2	+6	7	1997 Copa CONMEBOL	0–0			5–0
3	Deportivo Pesquero	3	0	1	2	5	9	−4	1			2–3		
4	Cienciano	3	0	1	2	3	11	−8	1				2–2	

Updated to match(es) played on 1996. Source:
Legend: Blue = home team win; Yellow = draw; Red = away team win.
Rules for classification: 1) points; 2) goal difference; 3) number of goals scored.

=== Results ===
28 November 1996	Deportivo Pesquero	2–3	Universitario	Estadio Nacional, Lima
19:00	Juan Manuel Mouro 56'; Isidro Fuentes 75'		Adrián Czornomaz 37' 78'; Gabriel González 40'	Referee: César Córdova

28 November 1996	Alianza Lima	4–1	Cienciano	Estadio Nacional, Lima
21:00	Ze Carlos 16'; Waldir Sáenz 21'; Paulo Hinostroza 73'; Marcelo Bujica 83'		Néstor Márquez 68'	Attendance: 9,841; Referee: Luis Seminario

1 December 1996	Cienciano	2–2	Deportivo Pesquero	Estadio Nacional, Lima
13:30	Paul Cominges 13'; Mario Rebollo 80'		Francesco Manassero 50' 55'	Referee: Luis Díaz

1 December 1996	Universitario	0–0	Alianza Lima	Estadio Nacional, Lima
15:30				Attendance: 17,991; Referee: José Arana

8 December 1996	Alianza Lima	4–1	Deportivo Pesquero	Estadio Nacional, Lima
15:30	Marcelo Bujica 26'; Andrés Gonzáles 51'; Frank Ruiz 72'; Marco Valencia 83'		Isidro Fuentes 75'	Attendance: 5,229; Referee: Alberto Tejada

8 December 1996	Universitario	5–0	Cienciano	Estadio Municipal de Chorrillos, Lima
15:30	Adrián Czornomaz 11' 32' 80'; Gabriel Gonález 14' 69'			Attendance: 2,253; Referee: Luis Seminario

== See also ==
- 1996 Peruvian Segunda División
- 1996 Copa Perú
