= 1994 Torneo Descentralizado =

Torneo Descentralizado
- Season: 1994
- Dates: 20 February 1994 – 19 December 1994
- Champions: Sporting Cristal; 11th Primera División title
- Runner up: Alianza Lima
- Relegated: Carlos A. Mannucci; Defensor Lima
- Copa Libertadores: Sporting Cristal; Alianza Lima
- Copa CONMEBOL: Ciclista Lima
- Top goalscorer: Flavio Maestri (25 goals)

The 1994 Torneo Descentralizado was the 79th season of the top category of Peruvian football (soccer). A total of 16 teams competed.

Sporting Cristal won the national championship, beginning a run of three consecutive league titles. The club secured the title with four matches remaining after drawing 1–1 against Unión Minas at the Estadio Nacional.

== Changes from 1993 ==
- The Torneo Intermedio was replaced by the Torneo Apertura which qualified its champion to the 1995 Copa CONMEBOL and awarded the club two points for the Torneo Descentralizado.
- The third-to-last club vs. Copa Perú runner-up relegation playoff was removed.

== Teams ==
=== Team changes ===
Promoted from 1993 Segunda División	Promoted from 1993 Copa Perú	Relegated from 1993 Primera División
▲ Ciclista Lima (1st)	▲ Aurich–Cañaña (1st)	▼ Unión Huaral (15th) ▼UTC (16th)

=== Stadia locations ===
Locations of the 1994 Primera División teams

Team	City	Stadium	Capacity
Alianza Atlético	Sullana	Campeones del 36	8,000
Alianza Lima	Lima	Alejandro Villanueva	35,000
Aurich–Cañaña	Chiclayo	Elías Aguirre	24,500
Carlos A. Mannucci	Trujillo	Mansiche	24,000
Ciclista Lima	Lima	Nacional	45,750
Cienciano	Cusco	Garcilaso	42,056
Defensor Lima	Lima	Nacional	45,750
Deportivo Municipal	Lima	Nacional	45,750
Deportivo Sipesa	Chimbote	Manuel Gómez Arellano	25,000
León de Huánuco	Huánuco	Heraclio Tapia	15,000
Melgar	Arequipa	Mariano Melgar	20,000
San Agustín	Lima	Nacional	45,750
Sport Boys	Callao	Telmo Carbajo	5,000
Sporting Cristal	Lima	Estadio Nacional	45,750
Unión Minas	Cerro de Pasco	Daniel Alcides Carrión	8,000
Universitario	Lima	Teodoro Lolo Fernández	15,000

== Torneo Apertura ==
The tournament was played prior to the main Torneo Descentralizado. The group winners advanced to the playoff final. Its champion qualified for the 1995 Copa CONMEBOL.

=== Group A ===
Pos	Team	Pld	W	D	L	GF	GA	GD	Pts	Qualification or relegation	SC	LEO	ALI	SIP	CIE	AUR	AGU	DEF
1	Sporting Cristal	7	5	0	2	23	5	+18	10	Final				5–0	4–0			3–0
2	León de Huánuco	7	4	2	1	11	8	+3	10		2–1		2–1		1–0		3–1	
3	Alianza Lima	7	3	3	1	15	11	+4	9		2–1			1–1				3–1
4	Deportivo Sipesa	7	3	3	1	9	9	0	9			1–1				2–0	2–1	2–0
5	Cienciano	7	1	4	2	8	11	−3	6				3–3	1–1		0–0		3–1
6	Aurich-Cañaña	7	2	2	3	9	14	−5	6		1–5	3–1	1–3				2–1	
7	San Agustín	7	0	3	4	7	15	−8	3		0–4		2–2		1–1			
8	Defensor Lima	7	0	3	4	6	15	−9	3			1–1				2–2	1–1	

Legend: Blue = home team win; Yellow = draw; Red = away team win.

=== Group B ===
Pos	Team	Pld	W	D	L	GF	GA	GD	Pts	Qualification or relegation	CIC	SBA	MUN	MEL	MAN	MIN	AAS	UNI
1	Ciclista Lima	7	5	2	0	20	8	+12	12	Final				4–3		3–0	4–1	4–1
2	Sport Boys	7	4	1	2	14	8	+6	9		1–1			1–0	2–1			6–0
3	Deportivo Municipal	7	3	2	2	8	7	+1	8		0–2	2–0		2–1				
4	Melgar	7	3	1	3	15	10	+5	7						2–1	6–0		2–1
5	Carlos A. Mannucci	7	2	3	2	9	8	+1	7		2–2		0–0			0–0	3–1	
6	Unión Minas	7	1	4	2	4	12	−8	6			1–0	0–0				1–1	
7	Alianza Atlético	7	1	2	4	11	20	−9	4			3–4	3–2	1–1				1–5
8	Universitario	7	1	1	5	11	19	−8	3				1–2		1–2	2–2		

Legend: Blue = home team win; Yellow = draw; Red = away team win.

=== Final ===
30 March 1994	Sporting Cristal	4–1	Ciclista Lima	Estadio Nacional, Lima
19:30	Palacios 4'; Julinho 6' 51'; Solano 56'		Aguilar 13'	Attendance: 7,100; Referee: Fernando Chappell

Sporting Cristal as Torneo Apertura champion; receive 2 bonus points for Torneo Descentralizado and qualified for 1995 Copa CONMEBOL. Later declines berth for Copa Libertadores berth. Ciclista Lima as Runner-up competes in the Copa CONMEBOL instead.

== Torneo Descentralizado ==
Sporting Cristal received 2 bonus points as Torneo Apertura champions. Sporting Cristal declined their Copa CONMEBOL berth after qualifying for the Copa Libertadores at the end of the Torneo Descentralizado.

=== Standings ===
Pos	Team	Pld	W	D	L	GF	GA	GD	Pts	Qualification or relegation
1	Sporting Cristal (C)	30	24	3	3	86	19	+67	53	1995 Copa Libertadores
2	Universitario	30	19	4	7	43	20	+23	42	Liguilla Pre-Libertadores with 1 bonus point
3	Alianza Lima	30	16	8	6	56	29	+27	40	Pre-Liguilla
4	León de Huánuco	30	17	4	9	43	36	+7	38	Pre-Liguilla
5	Deportivo Sipesa	30	12	9	9	38	30	+8	33	Pre-Liguilla
6	Deportivo Municipal	30	13	6	11	40	37	+3	32	Pre-Liguilla
7	Ciclista Lima	30	13	6	11	54	54	0	32	Pre-Liguilla
8	Melgar	30	12	7	11	41	42	−1	31	Pre-Liguilla
9	Aurich-Cañaña	30	12	6	12	36	36	0	30	
10	Unión Minas	30	10	8	12	32	42	−10	28	
11	Sport Boys	30	11	2	17	34	43	−9	24	
12	San Agustín	30	8	8	14	36	48	−12	24	
13	Cienciano	30	7	7	16	23	41	−18	21	
14	Alianza Atlético	30	8	5	17	38	59	−21	21	
15	Carlos A. Mannucci (R)	30	6	8	16	24	45	−21	20	1995 Copa Perú
16	Defensor Lima (R)	30	2	9	19	25	68	−43	13	1995 Segunda División

(C) Champions; (R) Relegated

=== Results ===
Home \ Away	AAS	ALI	AUR	CAM	CIC	CIE	DEF	MUN	SIP	LEO	MEL	AGU	SBA	CRI	MIN	UNI
Alianza Atlético		0–2	0–0	1–2	2–1	3–0	3–2	3–1	2–1	0–2	2–1	3–3	1–2	3–4	5–2	1–1
Alianza Lima	2–0		4–0	1–0	1–3	1–1	4–0	2–1	1–1	5–0	3–2	4–2	4–1	0–1	1–0	1–0
Aurich–Cañaña	4–1	1–2		0–0	1–2	1–0	2–1	0–0	1–2	0–0	1–0	1–0	1–0	0–0	5–0	1–1
Carlos A. Mannucci	3–1	3–3	3–1		1–1	4–1	0–0	0–1	0–1	1–2	2–1	1–1	1–2	0–4	0–0	0–1
Ciclista Lima	4–2	2–1	2–1	1–0		1–0	6–1	3–4	1–1	0–2	1–1	4–2	2–1	0–1	3–2	0–5
Cienciano	3–0	1–1	1–2	1–0	3–1		1–0	0–0	1–1	2–1	0–1	2–1	1–0	0–1	0–0	1–2
Defensor Lima	1–1	0–2	0–1	0–1	2–2	0–0		1–6	1–1	0–1	3–3	0–0	1–2	1–11	3–1	0–1
Deportivo Municipal	1–1	0–3	2–3	1–0	1–1	2–0	1–0		1–2	0–0	3–0	2–2	2–1	0–4	1–0	0–1
Deportivo Sipesa	1–2	1–1	3–2	1–1	3–1	1–0	1–1	0–2		5–1	0–0	2–0	1–0	0–0	2–0	2–0
León de Huánuco	2–0	4–3	3–0	1–0	0–1	2–1	3–1	0–1	1–0		1–3	2–0	1–2	4–0	2–1	2–1
Melgar	1–0	1–1	0–2	3–0	3–3	2–0	1–1	4–2	3–2	2–1		2–0	1–2	1–0	2–1	0–1
San Agustín	2–1	0–0	1–2	2–0	2–3	2–1	4–0	0–1	1–0	2–2	0–1		1–1	0–4	2–2	2–1
Sport Boys	3–0	1–2	3–1	1–1	2–1	2–1	2–3	0–1	0–1	0–2	2–0	0–1		0–3	4–0	0–1
Sporting Cristal	4–0	1–0	2–1	5–0	3–1	6–1	4–1	3–2	3–2	4–0	5–0	4–0	5–0		1–1	2–0
Unión Minas	2–0	1–0	1–0	3–0	3–2	0–0	2–1	2–1	1–0	1–1	0–0	1–3	2–0	1–0		2–3
Universitario	2–0	1–1	2–1	4–0	3–1	3–0	1–0	1–0	2–0	0–2	3–2	1–0	1–0	0–1	0–0	

Updated to match(es) played on 1994. Source: RSSSF Peru 1994
Legend: Blue = home team win; Yellow = draw; Red = away team win.

== Pre-Liguilla ==
Team 1	Agg.	Team 2	1st leg	2nd leg
Melgar	1–2	Alianza Lima	1–0	0–2
León de Huánuco	2–2	Ciclista Lima	0–0	2–2
Deportivo Sipesa	3–3	Deportivo Municipal	1–1	2–2

=== First leg ===
4 December 1994	Melgar	1–0	Alianza Lima	Estadio Mariano Melgar, Arequipa
15:30	Jorge Tapia 27'			Attendance: 16,000; Referee: Luis Seminario

4 December 1994	León de Huánuco	0–0	Ciclista Lima	Estadio Heraclio Tapia, Huánuco
15:30				Attendance: 4,028; Referee: José Arana

4 December 1994	Deportivo Sipesa	1–1	Deportivo Municipal	Estadio Manuel Gómez Arellano, Chimbote
15:30	Gustavo Tempone 52'		Alfonso Yañez 54'	Referee: César Córdova

=== Second leg ===
7 December 1994	Deportivo Municipal	2–2	Deportivo Sipesa	Estadio Nacional, Lima
18:00	César Charún 53'; Eugenio La Rosa 60'		Gustavo Tempone 17'; Ader Cruz 37'	Referee: Luis Seminario

7 December 1994	Alianza Lima	2–0	Melgar	Estadio Alejandro Villanueva, Lima
19:00	Waldir Sáenz 46' 89'			Attendance: 10,900; Referee: Fernando Chappell

7 December 1994	Ciclista Lima	2–2	León de Huánuco	Estadio Nacional, Lima
20:00	Gerson Lente 15'; Manuel López 75'		Ismael Zegarra 33'; Ricardo Cano 53'	Attendance: 7,587; Referee: Antonio Arnao

Alianza Lima, Deportivo Sipesa and León de Huánuco qualified for the Liguilla Pre-Libertadores.

== Liguilla Pre-Libertadores ==
All matches were played in Lima. Universitario started with 1 bonus point for finishing second in the Torneo Descentralizado.

=== Standings ===
Pos	Team	Pld	W	D	L	GF	GA	GD	Pts	Qualification or relegation	ALI	SIP	LEO	UNI
1	Alianza Lima	3	2	1	0	5	2	+3	5	1995 Copa Libertadores			3–1	2–1
2	Deportivo Sipesa	3	1	2	0	4	3	+1	4		0–0		3–2	
3	León de Huánuco	3	1	0	2	6	8	−2	2					3–2
4	Universitario	3	0	1	2	4	6	−2	2			1–1		

Legend: Blue = home team win; Yellow = draw; Red = away team win.

=== Results ===
11 December 1994	Alianza Lima	3–1	León de Huánuco	Estadio Nacional, Lima
14:00	José Soto 8'; Darío Muchotrigo 66'; Waldir Sáenz 77'		Giuliano Portilla 81'	Referee: César Córdova

11 December 1994	Universitario	1–1	Deportivo Sipesa	Estadio Nacional, Lima
16:00	Andrés Gonzales 16'		Alberto Ramírez 13'	Attendance: 13,695; Referee: Antonio Arnao

14 December 1994	Deportivo Sipesa	3–2	León de Huánuco	Estadio Nacional, Lima
19:00	Gustavo Tempone 19' (pen.); Juan Carlos Ormeño 56'; Alberto Ramírez 66'		Danny Chumpitaz 41' 74'	Referee: Luis Seminario

14 December 1994	Alianza Lima	2–1	Universitario	Estadio Nacional, Lima
21:00	Juan Jayo 30' 65'		William Castro 44' (pen.)	Attendance: 30,251; Referee: Fernando Chapell

18 December 1994	León de Huánuco	3–2	Universitario	Estadio Nacional, Lima
14:00	Pedro Valera 59'; Ismael Zegarra 62' 90'		Freddy Torrealva 8' 48'	Referee: José Arana

18 December 1994	Deportivo Sipesa	0–0	Alianza Lima	Estadio Nacional, Lima
16:00				Attendance: 22,767; Referee: César Córdova

== See also ==
- 1994 Peruvian Segunda División
- 1994 Copa Perú
