= 1995 Torneo Descentralizado =

Torneo Descentralizado
- Season: 1995
- Dates: 4 March 1995 – 27 December 1995
- Champions: Sporting Cristal; 12th Primera División title
- Runner up: Universitario
- Relegated: Unión Huaral; León de Huánuco
- Copa Libertadores: Sporting Cristal; Universitario
- Copa CONMEBOL: Alianza Lima
- Top goalscorer: Julinho (23 goals)

The 1995 Torneo Descentralizado was the 80th season of the top flight of Peruvian football. A total of 16 teams competed in the tournament. The season began on March 4 and concluded on December 27 with the victory of Universitario de Deportes over Alianza Lima for the second berth to the 1996 Copa Libertadores. Sporting Cristal successfully defended its national title after finishing 12 points ahead of Alianza Lima and Universitario.

== Changes from 1994 ==
- Torneo Apertura was removed; Torneo Descentralizado immediately began and played on a home-and-away basis between the 16 clubs.
- The Octagonal was played at the end of the season with the 8 best-placed teams of the first phase.
- In the Octagonal, the 8 clubs played a further 14 rounds to determine the national champion and the berths to the Copa Libertadores and Copa CONMEBOL.

== Teams ==
=== Team changes ===
Promoted from 1994 Segunda División	Promoted from 1994 Copa Perú	Relegated from 1994 Primera División
▲ Unión Huaral (1st)	▲ Atlético Torino (1st)	▼ Carlos A. Mannucci (15th) ▼ Defensor Lima (16th)

=== Stadia locations ===
Locations of the 1995 Primera División teams

Team	City	Stadium	Capacity
Alianza Atlético	Sullana	Campeones del 36	8,000
Alianza Lima	Lima	Alejandro Villanueva	35,000
Atlético Torino	Talara	Campeonísimo	8,000
Aurich–Cañaña	Chiclayo	Elías Aguirre	24,500
Ciclista Lima	Lima	Nacional	45,750
Cienciano	Cusco	Garcilaso	42,056
Deportivo Municipal	Lima	Nacional	45,750
Deportivo Sipesa	Chimbote	Manuel Gómez Arellano	25,000
León de Huánuco	Huánuco	Heraclio Tapia	15,000
Melgar	Arequipa	Mariano Melgar	20,000
San Agustín	Lima	Nacional	45,750
Sport Boys	Callao	Telmo Carbajo	5,000
Sporting Cristal	Lima	San Martín de Porres	18,000
Unión Huaral	Huaral	Julio Lores Colan	10,000
Unión Minas	Cerro de Pasco	Daniel Alcides Carrión	8,000
Universitario	Lima	Teodoro Lolo Fernández	15,000

== First stage ==
=== Standings ===
Pos	Team	Pld	W	D	L	GF	GA	GD	Pts	Qualification or relegation
1	Sporting Cristal	30	21	5	4	76	27	+49	68	Octogonal Final
2	Alianza Lima	30	22	1	7	53	20	+33	67	Octogonal Final
3	Universitario	30	19	6	5	54	26	+28	63	Octogonal Final
4	Cienciano	30	16	5	9	39	33	+6	53	Octogonal Final
5	Deportivo Sipesa	30	13	11	6	51	22	+29	50	Octogonal Final
6	Melgar	30	13	8	9	41	39	+2	47	Octogonal Final
7	Deportivo Municipal	30	11	8	11	43	40	+3	41	Octogonal Final
8	San Agustín	30	11	7	12	38	42	−4	40	Octogonal Final
9	Sport Boys	30	10	9	11	31	31	0	39	
10	Alianza Atlético	30	10	5	15	35	52	−17	35	
11	Aurich–Cañaña	30	7	11	12	39	46	−7	32	
12	Unión Minas	30	9	5	16	37	51	−14	32	
13	Ciclista Lima	30	7	11	12	30	44	−14	32	
14	Atlético Torino	30	6	7	17	16	45	−29	25	
15	Unión Huaral (R)	30	5	8	17	27	50	−23	23	Relegation to the 1996 Segunda División
16	León de Huánuco (R)	30	2	9	19	15	57	−42	15	Relegation to the 1996 Copa Perú

Source: RSSSF
(R) Relegated

=== Results ===
Home \ Away	AAS	ALI	TOR	AUR	CIC	CIE	MUN	SIP	LEO	MEL	AGU	SBA	CRI	HUA	MIN	UNI
Alianza Atlético		0–2	1–1	2–1	2–1	0–1	4–5	0–0	2–0	4–1	3–2	2–1	2–1	0–2	2–1	1–1
Alianza Lima	1–0		1–0	2–0	2–0	3–0	3–1	2–1	3–2	1–0	3–1	1–0	0–1	2–0	6–0	6–3
Atlético Torino	1–1	1–0		2–3	1–3	0–1	1–0	0–4	0–0	0–0	1–2	0–4	0–2	2–1	2–0	0–1
Aurich–Cañaña	4–1	2–1	0–0		1–2	1–2	2–2	1–1	6–1	1–1	1–0	1–1	0–1	2–2	2–1	2–2
Ciclista Lima	3–0	0–1	0–1	0–0		1–0	0–0	1–1	1–0	1–1	1–1	1–1	1–0	1–1	1–1	0–1
Cienciano	1–2	1–0	2–0	1–0	5–1		2–0	1–0	1–1	1–2	1–0	2–0	4–4	3–1	3–1	2–0
Deportivo Municipal	1–0	0–1	3–1	4–1	5–0	2–0		0–0	2–1	3–0	1–2	2–2	0–2	1–0	3–2	0–2
Deportivo Sipesa	3–0	1–0	0–1	2–1	2–0	2–0	0–0		6–0	5–0	4–1	3–0	2–2	1–0	3–0	1–2
León de Huánuco	0–0	0–3	0–0	2–0	1–2	0–0	1–3	1–1		0–1	1–1	0–2	1–3	2–0	1–1	0–3
Melgar	2–0	1–1	5–0	2–2	4–1	1–2	0–0	0–0	0–0		2–0	3–0	2–1	3–1	3–1	0–5
San Agustín	2–1	1–2	4–1	1–0	2–2	0–1	2–1	2–2	2–0	2–1		1–1	0–3	1–0	3–0	0–1
Sport Boys	2–0	0–1	1–0	0–0	1–1	0–0	0–0	0–0	3–0	1–2	2–1		0–2	3–0	2–1	1–2
Sporting Cristal	4–1	2–1	3–0	6–2	3–2	6–0	3–1	3–2	3–0	4–0	3–0	4–0		3–3	5–1	0–0
Unión Huaral	2–1	0–2	1–0	1–1	4–2	1–1	1–1	2–4	2–0	0–1	1–1	0–2	0–1		0–0	0–3
Unión Minas	4–0	2–1	2–0	2–0	2–1	2–0	2–1	0–0	3–0	1–3	1–2	0–1	0–0	4–0		1–2
Universitario	2–3	0–1	0–0	1–2	0–0	2–1	5–1	2–0	3–0	1–0	1–1	1–0	2–1	2–1	4–1	

Updated to match(es) played on 1995. Source: RSSSF Peru 1995
Legend: Blue = home team win; Yellow = draw; Red = away team win.

== Octogonal Final ==
=== Standings ===
Pos	Team	Pld	W	D	L	GF	GA	GD	Pts	Qualification or relegation	CRI	UNI	ALI	CIE	SIP	MUN	MEL	AGU
1	Sporting Cristal (C)	44	29	9	6	98	32	+66	96	Qualification to the 1996 Copa Libertadores group stage		0–1	1–1	3–0	3–2	1–0	2–0	4–0
2	Universitario	44	25	9	10	70	37	+33	84 (Note: Universitario and Alianza Lima–tied on points–played on extra match to determine the runners-up of the season.)	Qualification to the 1996 Copa Libertadores group stage	2–0		0–1	3–2	2–1	1–1	3–0	1–0
3	Alianza Lima	44	26	6	12	70	32	+38	84	Qualification to the 1996 Copa CONMEBOL first round	2–2	0–0		0–1	3–0	0–1	1–1	4–1
4	Cienciano	44	21	8	15	58	55	+3	71		0–0	1–0	1–0		1–1	4–1	1–1	6–0
5	Deportivo Sipesa	44	18	14	12	71	39	+32	68		0–0	1–0	0–0	6–0		2–1	2–0	2–0
6	Deportivo Municipal	44	17	11	16	64	62	+2	62		0–1	2–2	0–3	3–2	2–1		1–0	5–3
7	Melgar	44	17	11	16	52	57	−5	62		0–1	1–0	3–1	2–0	2–1	1–3		0–0
8	San Agustín	44	14	11	19	53	72	−19	53		1–4	1–1	1–1	2–0	3–1	1–1	2–0	

Source: RSSSF
Legend: Blue = home team win; Yellow = draw; Red = away team win.
(C) Champions

=== Second place play-off ===
27 December 1995
19:30

Alianza Lima	0–1	Universitario
		Roberto Martínez 85'

Estadio Nacional, Lima
Attendance: 45,714
Referee: Alberto Tejada

Universitario qualified for the 1996 Copa Libertadores.

== See also ==
- 1995 Peruvian Segunda División
- 1995 Copa Perú
