= Cerro Azul District =

Coordinates: 13.0249°S 76.4793°W

Cerro Azul Anqas Urqu
- District
- Coat of arms
- Interactive map of Cerro Azul
- Country: Peru
- Region: Lima
- Province: Cañete
- Founded: August 16, 1921
- Capital: Cerro Azul

Government
  - Mayor: José Pain García

Area
  - Total: 105.17 km^{2} (40.61 sq mi)
- Elevation: 3 m (9.8 ft)

Population (2017)
  - Total: 8,328
  - Density: 79.19/km^{2} (205.1/sq mi)
- Time zone: UTC-5 (PET)
- UBIGEO: 150504

Cerro Azul District is one of sixteen districts of the province Cañete in Peru.
