= La Molina District =

District of Lima, Peru

La Molina
- District
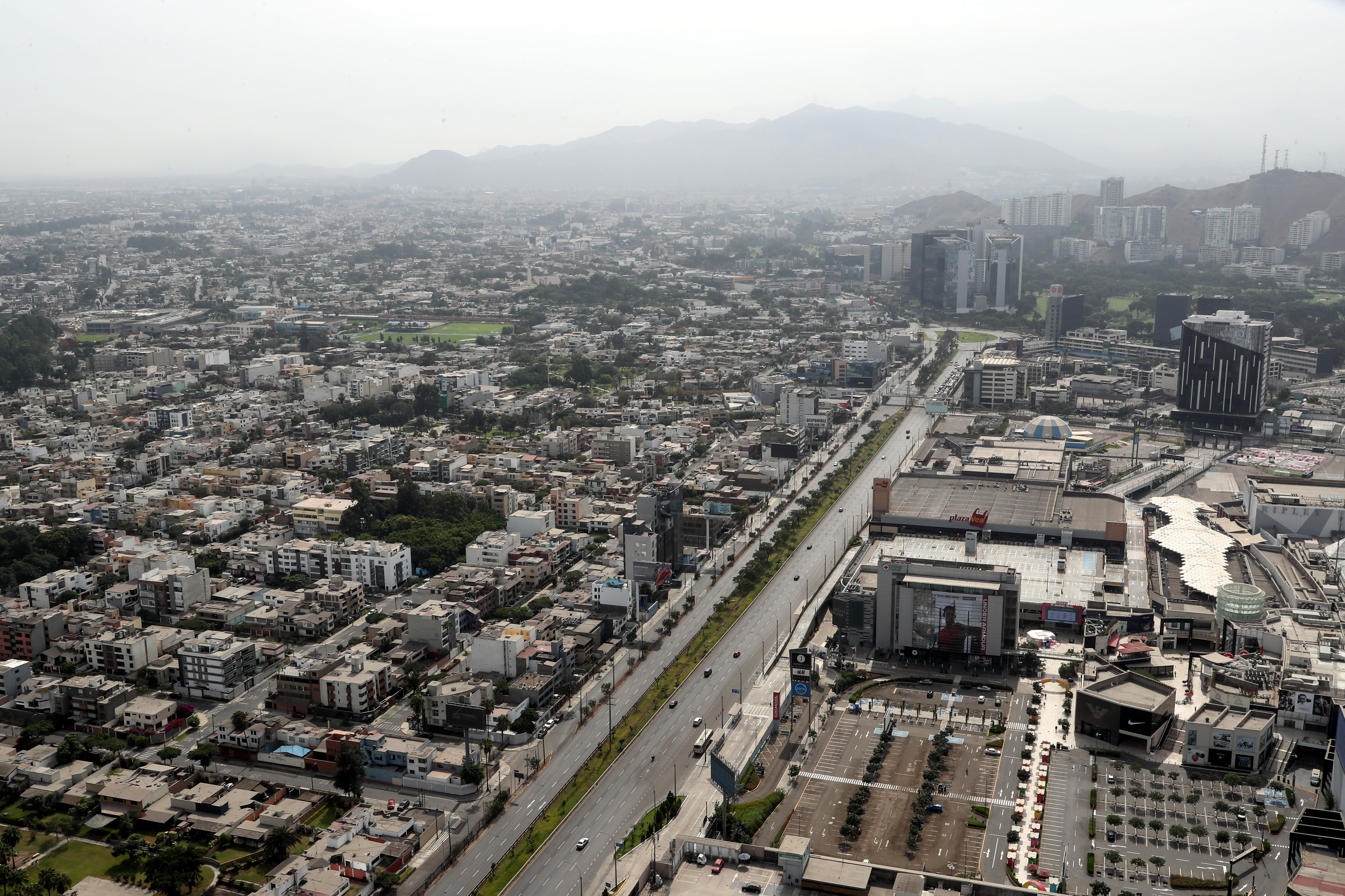

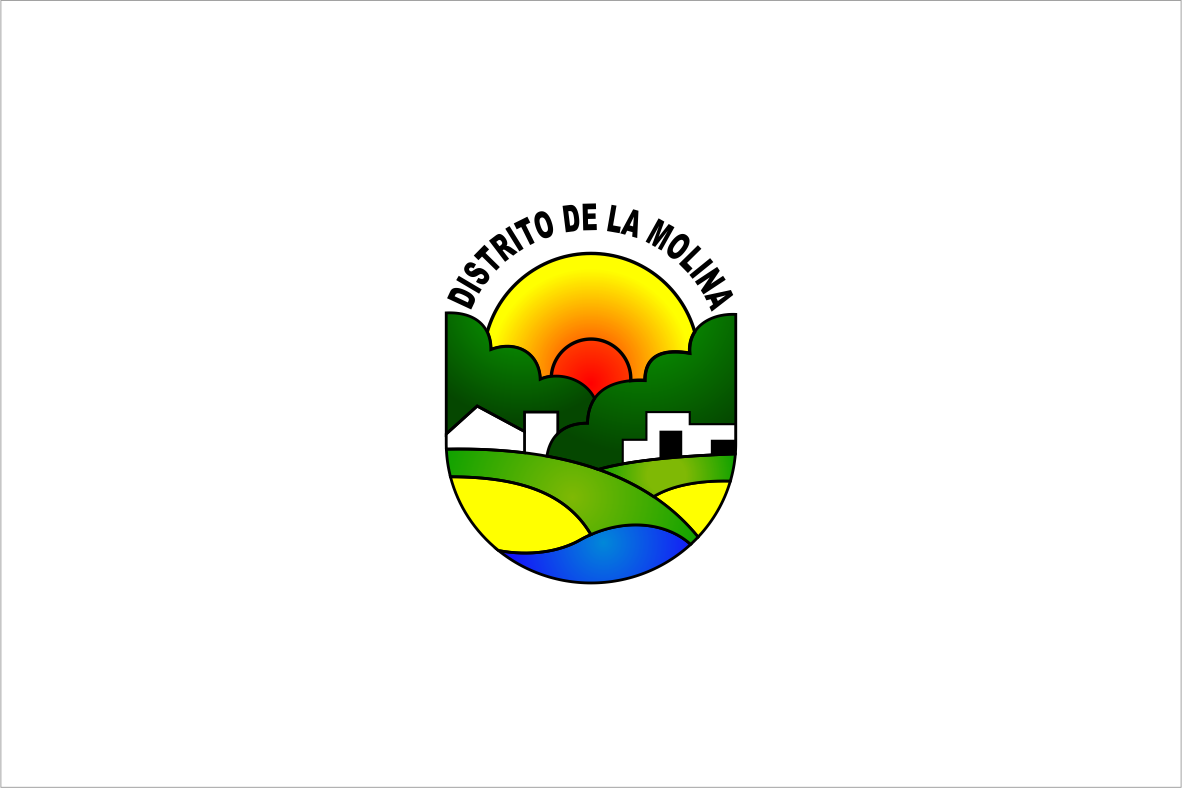
- Flag Coat of arms

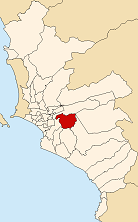
- Location of La Molina in Peru
- Coordinates: 12°4′40″S 76°54′40″W
- Country: Peru
- Department: Lima
- Province: Lima
- Founded: February 6, 1962
- Capital: La Molina

Government
  - Mayor: Esteban Uceda

Area
  - Total: 65.75 km^{2} (25.39 sq mi)
- Elevation: 241 m (791 ft)

Population (2023)
  - Total: 168,839
  - Density: 2,568/km^{2} (6,651/sq mi)
- Time zone: UTC-5 (PET)
- Area code: 12
- Postal code: 15026
- UBIGEO: 150114
- Website: munimolina.gob.pe

La Molina (Spanish: [la moˈlina]) is a district of Lima, Peru. Created in 1962, it has been recognised as one of the most affluent areas of the country. It has green parks, gated communities and multi-million dollar mansions. Residents typically include wealthy individuals, embassy staff and government officials.

== Etymology ==
The district may be named after captain Nicolás Flores de Molina, who once owned the land. It may also be named after Melchor Malo de Molina, Marquess of Monterrico, another landowner.

== History ==
The oldest structures in the district, two huacas known as Granados and Melgarejo, were built by the Lima people. The Lima was succeeded by the Ichma and the Inca Empire. The former is located in what is currently COVIMA, and was uncovered in the 1980s.

=== Spanish period ===
Following the Conquest of Peru, the area was divided by the Spanish government. The agricultural estates in the area came to be owned by captain Nicolás Flores de Molina. Additionally, another area was owned by the Marquess of Monterrico, whose lands—collectively known as Monterrico—extended all the way into Santiago de Surco, to the east of the river of the same name. Another hacienda, after which one huaca was named, was owned by Cristóbal Félix Cano Melgarejo in the 17th century. It changed owners several times until the 20th century, when was acquired by the heirs of the marquesses of Montealegre and Aulestia. Other estates include La Rinconada, later known for a battle in 1881, and Camacho, urbanised in the 1970s and named after Gregorio Camacho, one of its owners in the 18th century.

=== 20th century ===
The mid-20th century saw the rural population (between 600,000 and 1 million people) taking refuge in Lima, especially during the Internal conflict in Peru. The new arrivals, often very poor, erected hastily built shacks. Some residents of these shantytown neighborhoods have acquired property titles, but urban planning remains largely non-existent. In response, a number of wealthy neighborhoods built their own makeshift wall starting in 1985, citing security concerns and as a means of defense from Shining Path militants.

Following the end of the conflict, the structure received international attention and was dubbed the "Wall of Shame" (Spanish: muro de la vergüenza) since it separated La Molina from slums constructed on neighboring hills in Villa María del Triunfo, becoming a symbol of economic inequality in Peru. By 2019, some segments were up to 3 meters high and included barbed wire, having a total length of ten kilometers (6.2 mi). In 2023, the Constitutional Court of Peru ruled that the wall had to be demolished, with the process beginning in 2024.

== Geography ==
La Molina is part of Lima's Cono Este, an unofficial subregion of the city.

=== Climate ===
Climate data for La Molina District (Von Humboldt), elevation 247 m (810 ft), (1991–2020)
Month	Jan	Feb	Mar	Apr	May	Jun	Jul	Aug	Sep	Oct	Nov	Dec	Year
Mean daily maximum °C (°F)	28.3 (82.9)	29.9 (85.8)	29.9 (85.8)	27.8 (82.0)	24.3 (75.7)	21.1 (70.0)	19.7 (67.5)	19.4 (66.9)	20.7 (69.3)	22.6 (72.7)	23.9 (75.0)	25.7 (78.3)	24.4 (76.0)
Mean daily minimum °C (°F)	19.0 (66.2)	20.1 (68.2)	19.7 (67.5)	17.4 (63.3)	15.6 (60.1)	15.2 (59.4)	14.2 (57.6)	13.4 (56.1)	13.6 (56.5)	14.3 (57.7)	15.2 (59.4)	17.0 (62.6)	16.2 (61.2)
Average precipitation mm (inches)	0.9 (0.04)	1.0 (0.04)	0.9 (0.04)	0.6 (0.02)	1.1 (0.04)	1.6 (0.06)	1.7 (0.07)	2.3 (0.09)	1.5 (0.06)	0.6 (0.02)	1.1 (0.04)	0.4 (0.02)	13.7 (0.54)
Source: National Meteorology and Hydrology Service of Peru

== See also ==
- Administrative divisions of Peru
