= Guardia Republicana =

- Full name: Club Circolo Sportivo Guardia Republicana
- Founded: August 7, 1981
- Ground: Estadio Nacional, Lima
- Capacity: 45,000
- League: Copa Perú
| Home colours | Away colours |

Guardia Republicana is a Peruvian football club, playing in the city of Lima.

The club was founded 1981 and plays in the Copa Perú, which is the third division of the Peruvian league.

== History ==
The club was 1985, 1987, and 1995 Segunda División Peruana champion.

The club has played at the highest level of Peruvian football on three occasions, from 1986 Torneo Descentralizado until 1988 Torneo Descentralizado, when it was relegated. The team returned to the Peruvian First Division in 1996 (Torneo Descentralizado), but was relegated at the end of the same year. To this day it has not returned to professional football.

== Honours ==
=== National ===
- Peruvian Segunda División: 3
  - Winners (2): 1985, 1987, 1995
  - Runner-up (1): 1993

=== Regional ===
- Liga Provincial de Lima:
  - Winners (1): 1985
  - Runner-up (1): 1984

== See also ==
- List of football clubs in Peru
- Peruvian football league system
