= Quilmaná District =

Quilmaná Kilmana
- District
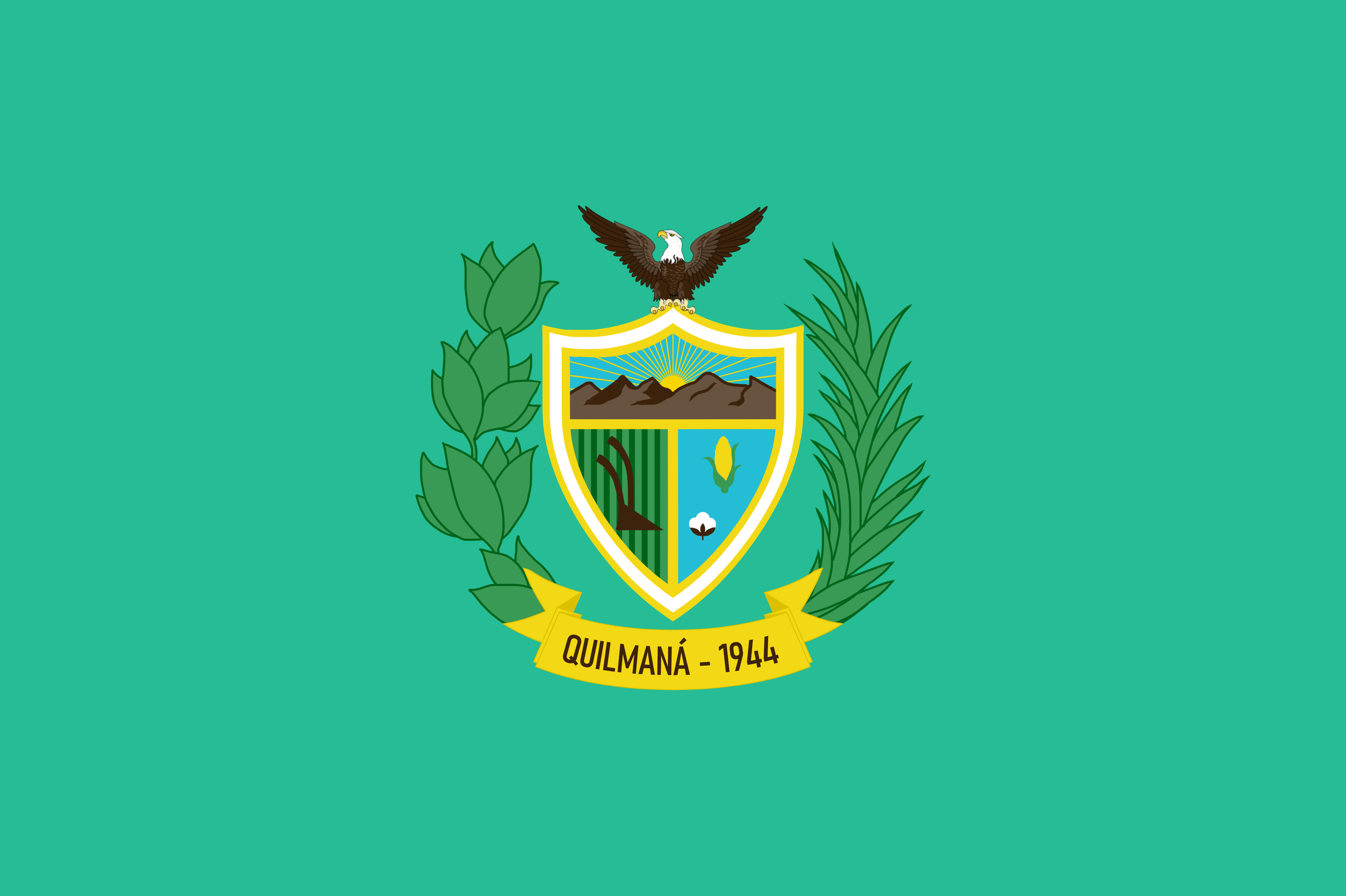
- Flag Coat of arms
- Interactive map of Quilmaná
- Coordinates: 12°57′34″S 76°23′17″W
- Country: Peru
- Region: Lima
- Province: Cañete
- Founded: September 15, 1944
- Capital: Quilmaná

Government
  - Mayor: Pedro Antonio Revilla Seminario

Area
  - Total: 437.4 km^{2} (168.9 sq mi)
- Elevation: 151 m (495 ft)

Population (2017)
  - Total: 16,091
  - Density: 36.79/km^{2} (95.28/sq mi)
- Time zone: UTC-5 (PET)
- UBIGEO: 150512
- Website: muniquilmana.gob.pe

Quilmaná District is one of sixteen districts of Cañete Province in Peru.

== Location ==
Quilmana is located adjacent to Imperial District, Nuevo Imperial District, and lunahuana District. To the north with Asia District. And to the west to San Vicente de Cañete District.

== Economy ==
Most of quilmana's workforce dedicates to agriculture, for example many crop citrus such as oranges, clementines, lemons, tangerines, as well as apples and strawberries.

There are a few cotton factories.
