= Mala District =

Coordinates: 12°39′27″S 76°37′45″W

Mala
- District
- Coat of arms
- Interactive map of Mala
- Country: Peru
- Region: Lima
- Province: Cañete
- Founded: July 22, 1825
- Capital: Mala

Government
  - Mayor: Sonia Ramos Ruiz (2019-2022)

Area
  - Total: 129.31 km^{2} (49.93 sq mi)
- Elevation: 30 m (98 ft)

Population (2017)
  - Total: 32,717
  - Density: 215.61/km^{2} (558.4/sq mi)
- Time zone: UTC-5 (PET)
- UBIGEO: 150509

Mala District is one of sixteen districts of the province Cañete in Peru. It limits on the north with San Antonio District and Santa Cruz de Flores District that separates them the Mala river. To the south-east, the Coayllo District.

== History ==
There once was a zone where the Huarcos, brave and strong warriors that defended with their lives the fort of Cañete against the devastating Incas. After the Huarcos civilization crumbled, Mala was ruled by the Incas in the Pachacamac temple located 30 km of Lima.

Near the Mala river there is a pre-incan tower (the area is now called "Las Totoritas") where Diego de Almagro and Francisco Pizarro had a reunion in 1537 and they were going to make peace. According to Pedro Cieza de León, Pizarro was planning to make a stampede to Almagro because he was his enemy. From the 19th Century, the animal husbandry Rinconada de Mala, property of the Asín family, is at service but now only the remaining part of the estate. It is at the Km.86 of the Panamerican Highway.

== Festivals ==
The patronal feast is celebrated at the Saint Peter's feast day, June 29. In its traditional food the district has the tamale, the chicharron, the bruta soup (a soup with dry rehydrated potatoes with noodles, also called in Spanish "mancha pecho"), the carapulcra, and the chapana (a sweet yucca).

== See also ==
Administrative divisions of Peru
