= Asia District, Peru =

Coordinates: 12°46′43″S 76°33′24″W

Asia
- District
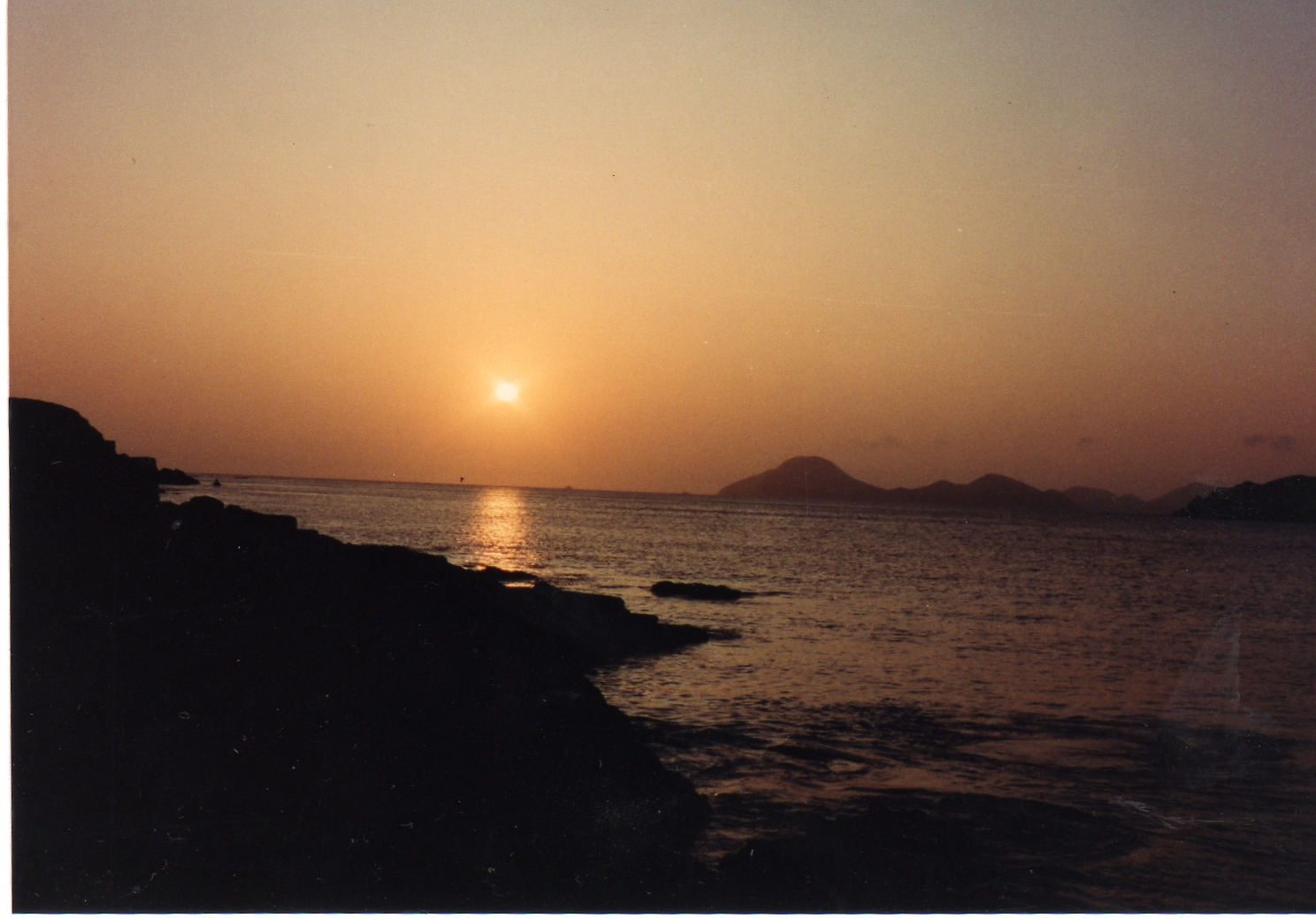
- A beach in Asia, Cañete

- Location of Asia in the Cañete province
- Country: Peru
- Department: Lima
- Province: Cañete
- Founded: July 24, 1964
- Capital: Asia

Government
  - Mayor: José Alcántara Malásquez (2019-2022)

Area
  - Total: 279.36 km^{2} (107.86 sq mi)

Population (2017)
  - Total: 9,784
  - Density: 35.02/km^{2} (90.71/sq mi)
- Time zone: UTC-5 (PET)
- Website: muniasia.gob.pe

Asia is a district of Cañete, a province of the department of Lima, in Peru. Established in 1964, the district's beaches overlook the Pacific Ocean, making it a popular summer getaway for the residents of Lima, the Peruvian capital. It is bordered by Mala District to the north, Cerro Azul District and Quilmaná District to the south, and Coayllo District to the east. Its main town is 97.5 kilometers (60.6 mi) south of Lima, approximately a two-hour drive.

== History ==
The district was officially established on July 24, 1964, prior to which it formed part of Coayllo District. Its creation was promoted by Benito Chumpitaz Chavez, who served as its first mayor.

On January 20, 2016, a fire destroyed a Wong supermarket, located in the district's open-air shopping centre, known as the Boulevard de Asia. The fire, which started at the warehouse, led to the arrival of 36 firefighting units, and 90% of the original building was destroyed, after which a provisional location was opened nine days later.

== Archaeology ==
There is a pre-ceramic archaeological site near the mouth of the river of Omas´ quebrada with the site are the remains of a small indigenous population and a cemetery.

== See also ==
- Administrative divisions of Peru
