= Protection Forest Adjacent to the Nuevo Imperial Canal Intake =

Coordinates: 13.1079°S 76.2964°W

The Protection Forest Adjacent to the Nuevo Imperial Canal Intake is an ecological project. The protected forest is adjacent to the New Imperial Canal Intake and is located approximately 150 km south of the city of Lima, Peru near the town of Lunahuaná in the Cañete Province. It is situated in an arid desert region which is a characteristic of the central coast of Peru.

It protects the Nuevo Imperial Canal Intake against the ravage of Cañete River. It also preserves the bordering soils and the infrastructure that guarantees the water supply for agricultural use in the valley.
