= Chilca, Cañete =

Chilca
- Town
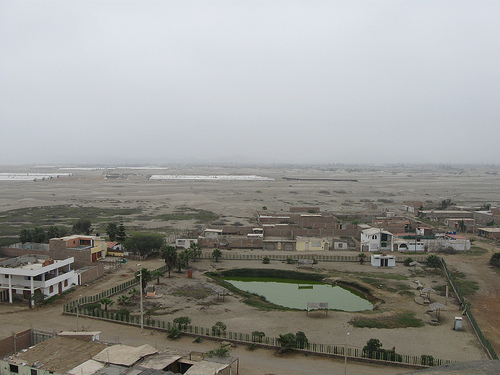
- View of the city

- Location within Peru
- Coordinates: 12°31′15″S 76°44′13″W
- Country: Peru
- Region: Lima
- Province: Cañete

Government
  - Mayor: Alfredo Rosas Chauca Navarro

Area
  - Total: 475.47 km^{2} (183.58 sq mi)
- Elevation: 78 m (256 ft)

Population (2017)
  - Total: 21,573
  - Density: 45.372/km^{2} (117.51/sq mi)
- Demonym: Chilcano/a
- Time zone: UTC-5 (PET)
  - Summer (DST): UTC-5 (PET)

Chilca is a Peruvian city located in the Lima Region. It is the capital of the Chilca District.

== History ==
It is located in the "old village of Chilca", dating from 7000 BC. This place is an old fishing village that has a wide beach and a Catholic church cemetery. This land is known for its abundant production of figs and pomegranates, as well as for lakes that locals say have healing properties, particularly for dermatological and bone ailments, hypertension problems and infertility.

The French explorer Jean-François-Marie de Surville was buried in Chilca after drowning off the coast in 1770.

== Lake ==
The primary lake in Chilca is called La Milagrosa or Qoricocha (gold pond in Quechua). Its accumulated water table or underground waters are highly mineralized, containing sodium chloride, sulfate, calcium carbonate which are said to be helpful for chronic articular rheumatism. The black mud is said to protect and revitalize the skin.

La Milagrosa is a lagoon of about 200 meters long and 50 meters wide. It is surrounded by numerous, not very deep, pools where visitors smear themselves with mud for a full body cast. There are several types of clay.

People tell how are the virtues of the waters and mud of these baths. Many of these come regularly for years and that people say that they have been definitely cured of diseases when they arrived to Lima or another place, feeling improvements in their health, just a week after starting treatment. Enrique Rueda, who was twice mayor of the district, tells about the people who visit the lakes and say that not only they're happy, but eternally grateful and cured.

== Festivals and traditions ==
In February, the locals celebrate the Fig festival. Many surfers come to the city to surf at the big waves in Chilca's beaches. On August 15 there is the procession of Our Lady of Assumption of Mary. It's a festival where people gather to have fun in Chilca and venerate the Virgin.
