= Zúñiga =

Zúñiga may refer to:

- Zúñiga (surname)
- Zuniga (spider), a genus of jumping spider
- Zúñiga, Navarre, a town in northern Spain
- Zúñiga District, in Peru
- Zuniga Glacier, in West Antarctica
- Deportivo Zúñiga, a Peruvian football club, playing in the city of Lima, Peru
- House of Zúñiga, a Spanish noble family descending of the kings of Navarre
