= Lunahuaná District =

Lunahuaná Lunawana
- District
- Coat of arms
- Interactive map of Lunahuaná
- Coordinates: 12°57′36″S 76°8′4″W
- Country: Peru
- Region: Lima
- Province: Cañete
- Founded: August 4, 1821
- Capital: Lunahuaná
- Subdivisions: 20 populated centers

Government
  - Mayor: Noe Benito Salazar Villarroel (2019-2022)

Area
  - Total: 500.33 km^{2} (193.18 sq mi)
- Elevation: 479 m (1,572 ft)

Population (2017)
  - Total: 4,393
  - Density: 8.780/km^{2} (22.74/sq mi)
- Time zone: UTC-5 (PET)
- Website: munilunahuana.gob.pe

Lunahuaná is a district in the middle Cañete Province in Peru. It is bordered by Imperial District on the west, San Vicente de Cañete District on the north, Pacarán District on the east, and Chincha Province on the south.

== See also ==
- Inka Wasi
