= Chilca District, Cañete =

Coordinates: 12.5186°S 76.7381°W

Chilca Ch'illka
- District
- Interactive map of Chilca
- Country: Peru
- Region: Lima
- Province: Cañete
- Capital: Chilca

Government
  - Mayor: Alfredo Rosas Chauca Navarro

Area
  - Total: 475.47 km^{2} (183.58 sq mi)
- Elevation: 3 m (9.8 ft)

Population (2017)
  - Total: 21,573
  - Density: 45.372/km^{2} (117.51/sq mi)
- Time zone: UTC-5 (PET)
- UBIGEO: 150505

Chilca District is one of sixteen districts of the province Cañete in Peru. The archaeological site of Paloma is located in this district, on the northern edge of the Chilca River's valley.
