= Calango District =

Coordinates: 12.5263°S 76.5438°W

Calango Kalanku
- District
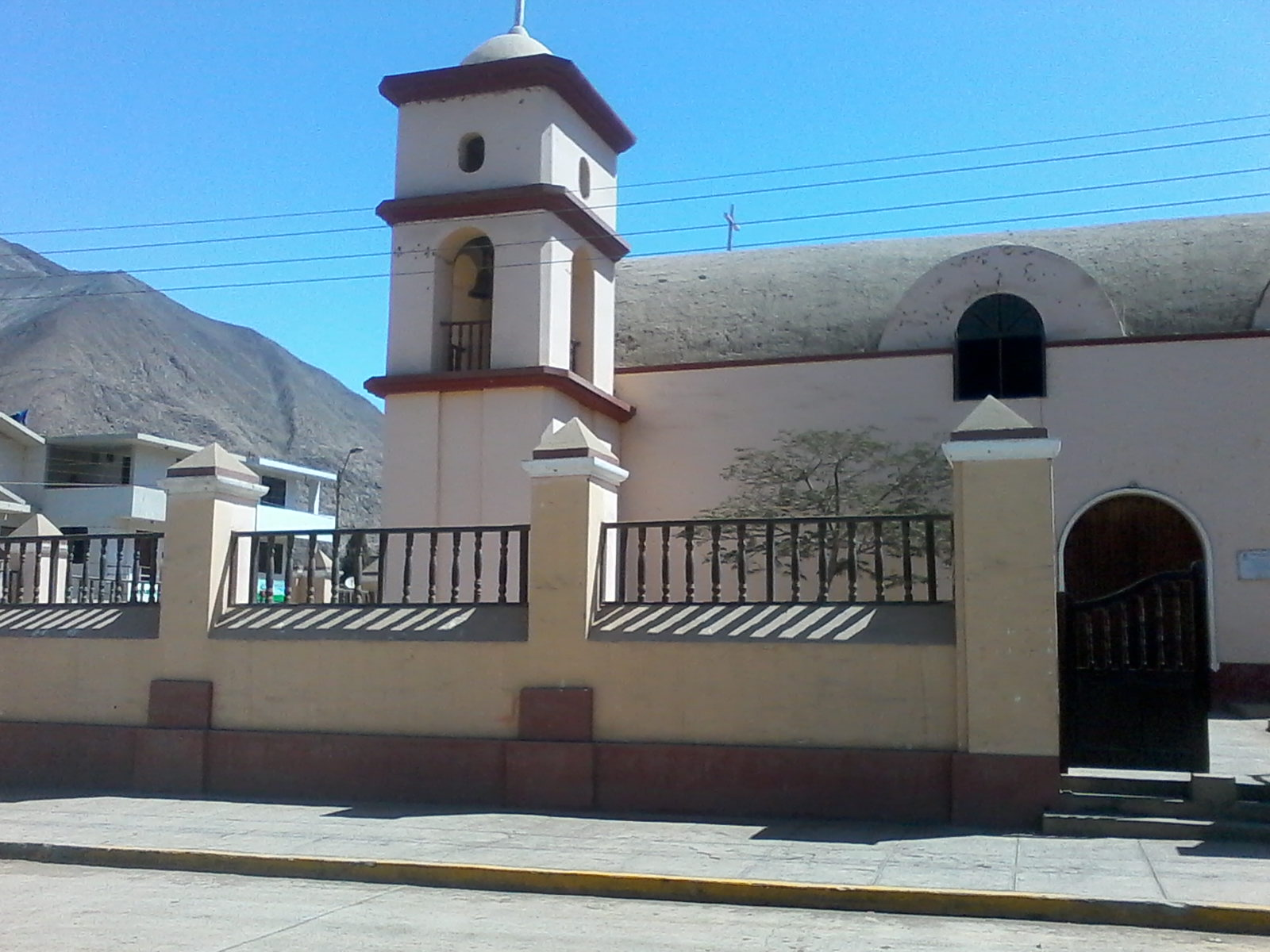
- Church of Calango

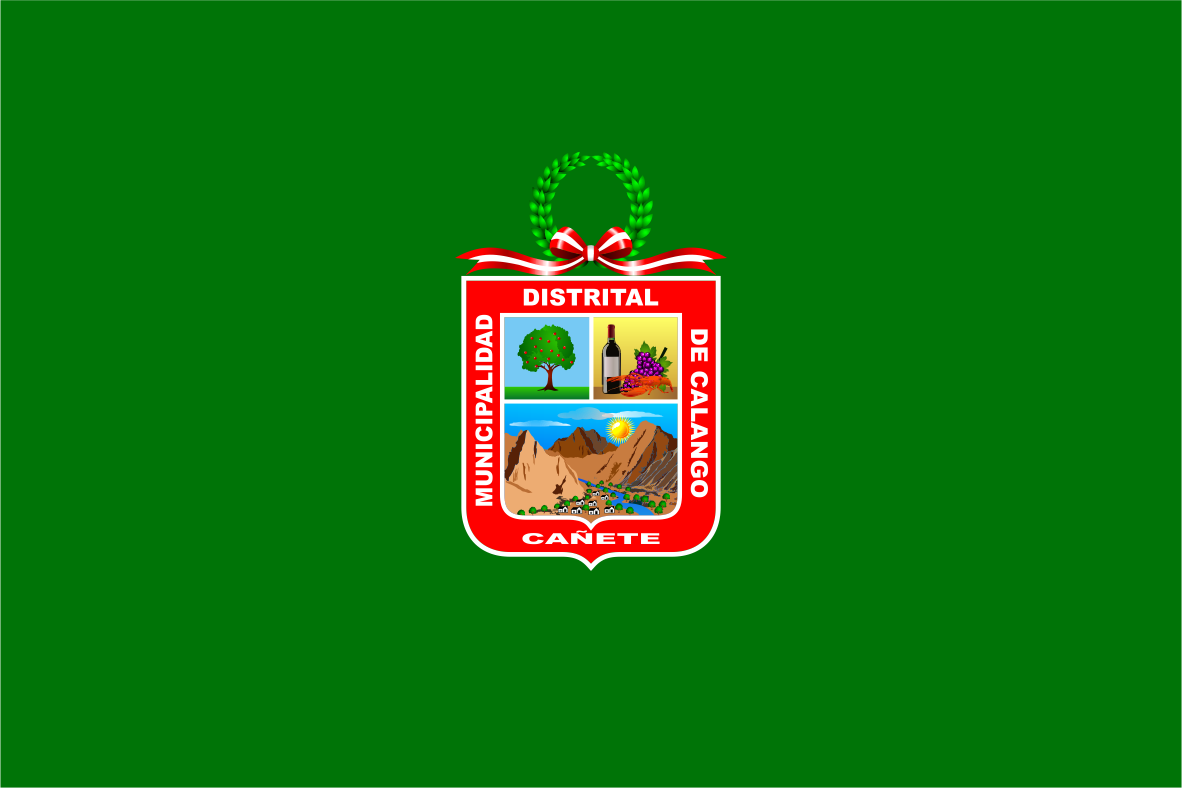
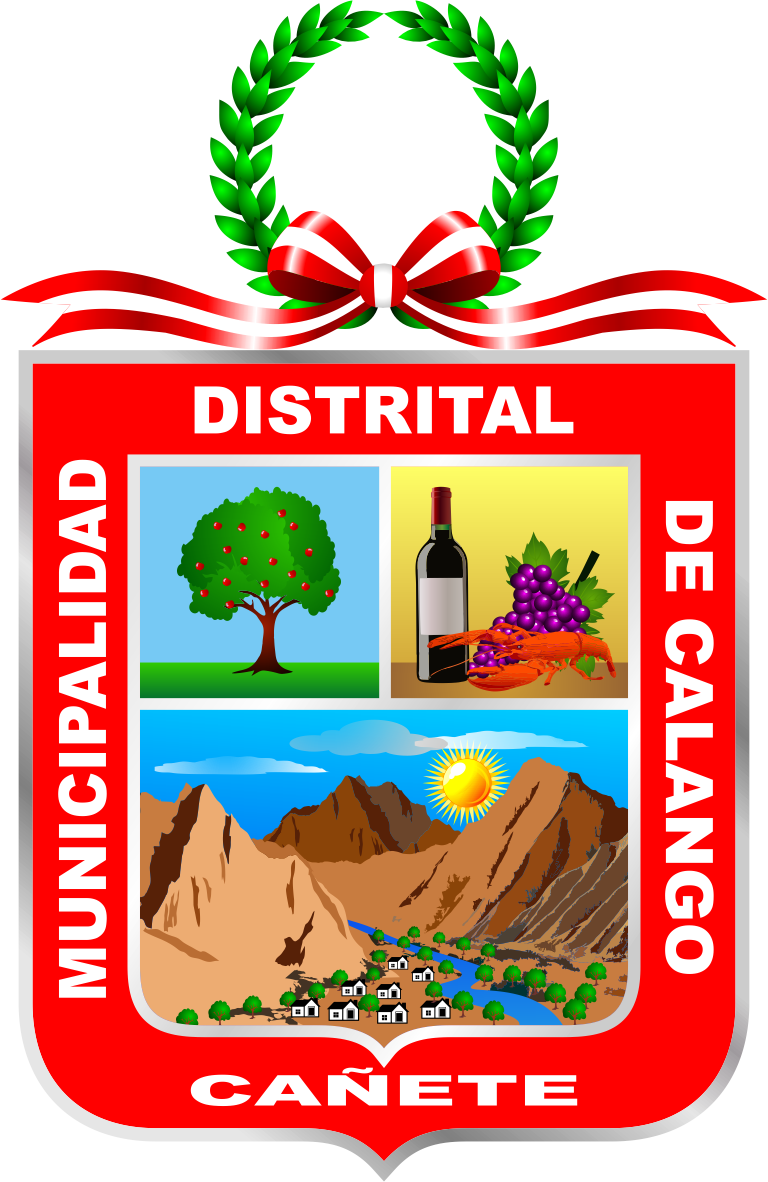
- Flag Coat of arms
- Interactive map of Calango
- Country: Peru
- Region: Lima
- Province: Cañete
- Founded: November 4, 1887
- Capital: Calango

Government
  - Mayor: Lucia Jesus Rodriguez Huambachano

Area
  - Total: 530.89 km^{2} (204.98 sq mi)
- Elevation: 305 m (1,001 ft)

Population (2017)
  - Total: 2,269
  - Density: 4.274/km^{2} (11.07/sq mi)
- Time zone: UTC-5 (PET)
- UBIGEO: 150503

Calango District is one of sixteen districts of the province Cañete in Peru.
