= San Vicente de Cañete =

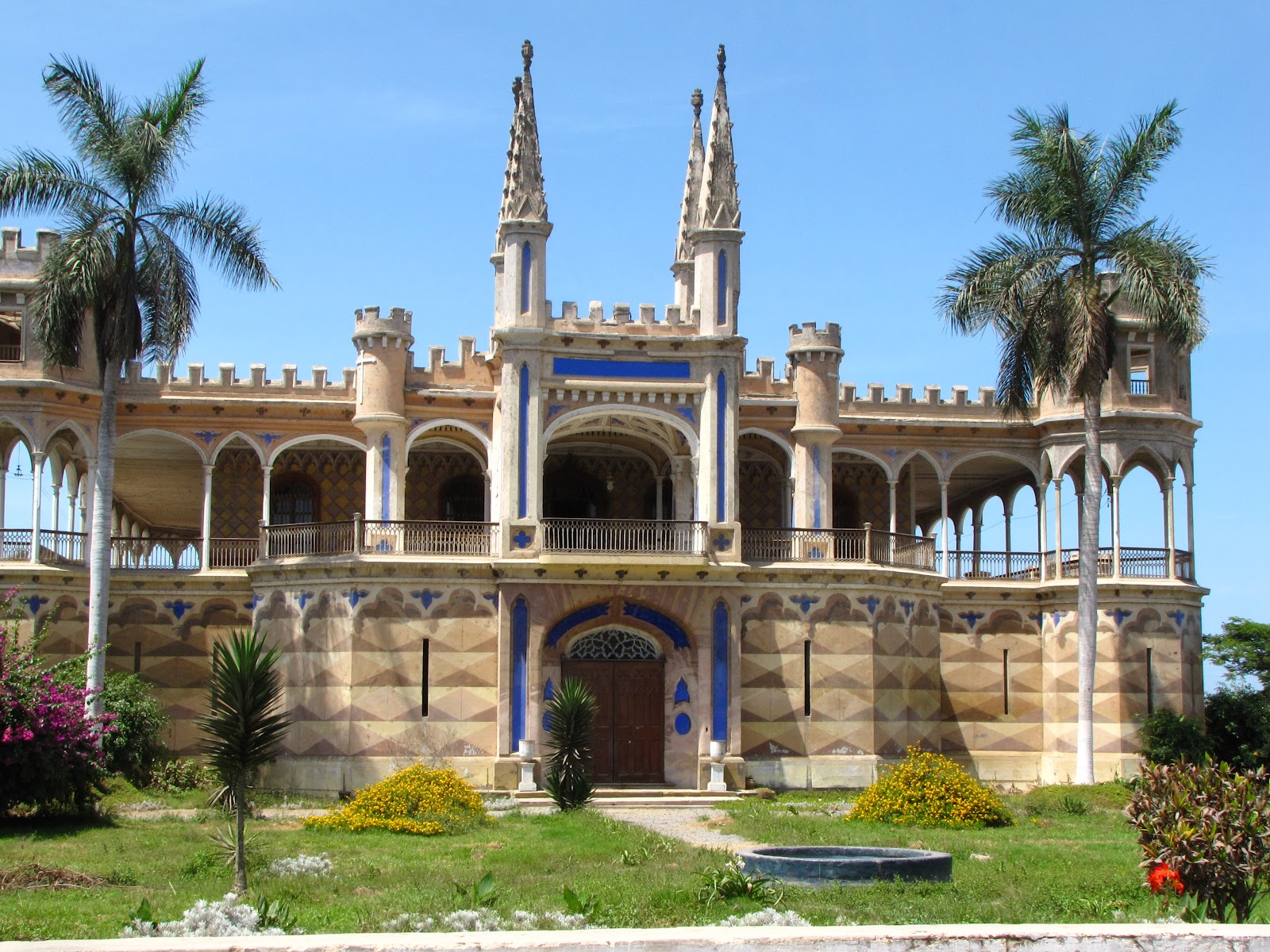
- Castillo Unanue, one of the main tourist attractions

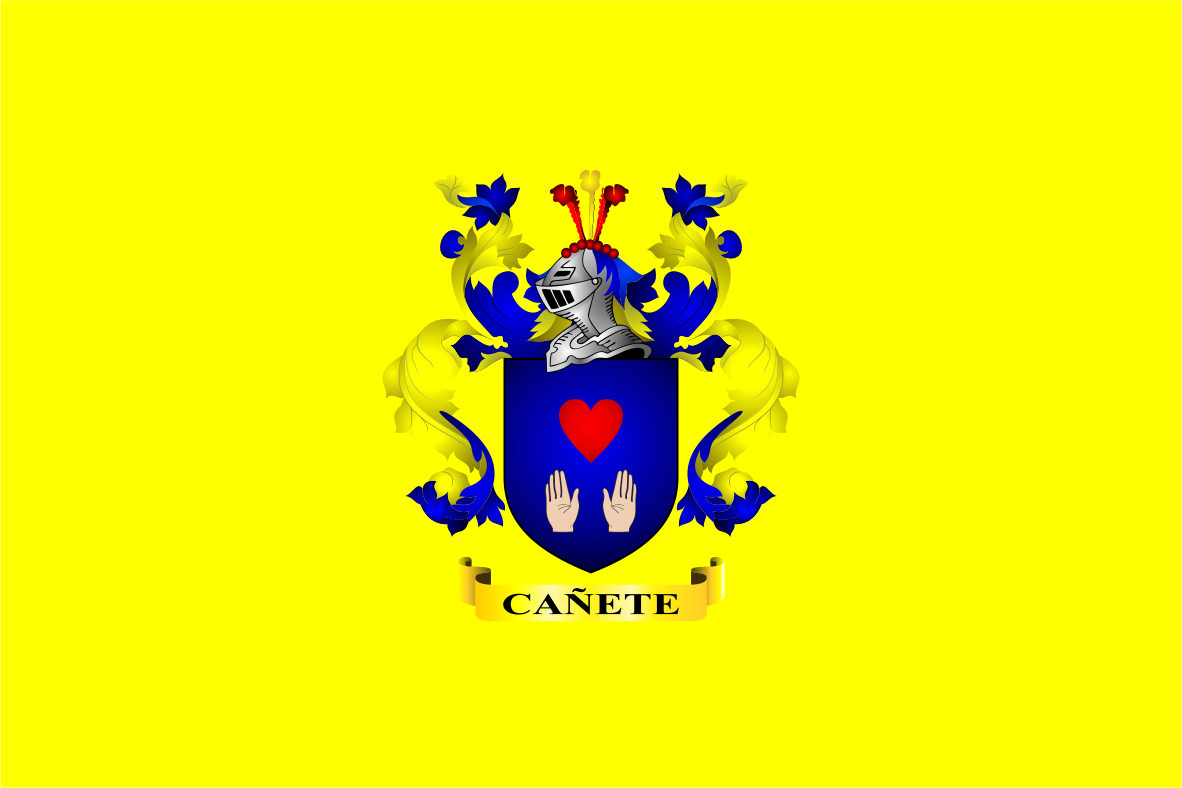
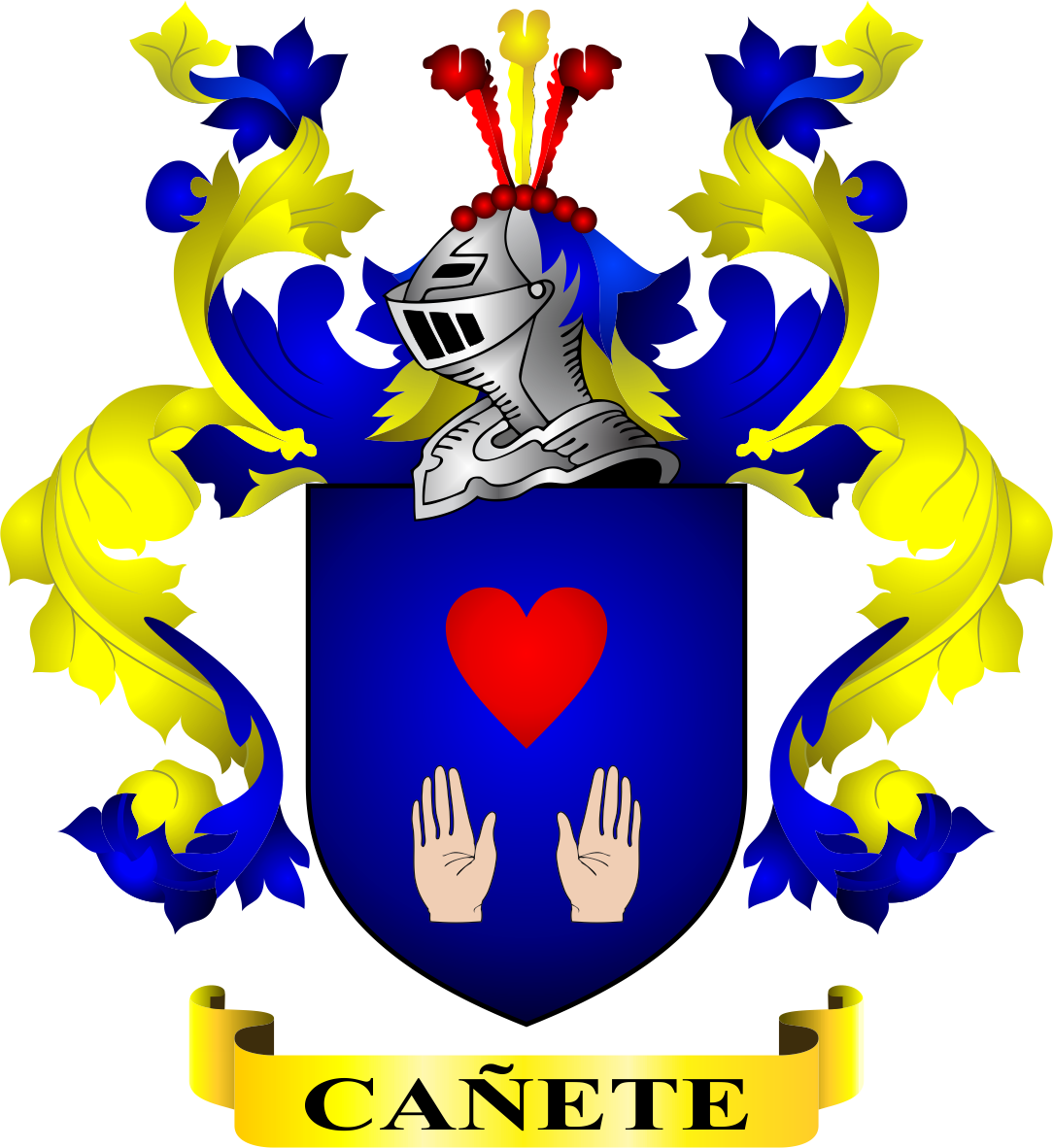
- Flag Coat of arms
- Nickname: Cuna y Capital del Arte Negro Nacional (Cradle and Capital of Afro-Peruvian Art)
- Location within Peru
- Coordinates: 13°05′S 76°24′W
- Country: Peru
- Region: Lima
- Province: Cañete
- District: San Vicente de Cañete
- Established: 30 August 1556

Government
  - Alcalde: Segundo Constantino Díaz De la Cruz (2019-2022)
- Elevation: 40 m (130 ft)

Population
  - Estimate (2015): 85,533
- Demonym: sanvicentino(a)
- Website: municanete.gob.pe

San Vicente de Cañete, commonly known as San Vicente or Cañete, is a city and capital of the Cañete Province, in southern Lima Region. With a population of 85,533 (2015 estimate).

The warm and peaceful town of Cañete is located just one and a half hour to the south of Lima (144 km) and serves, for tourists, primarily as a gateway to the Lunahuaná District. The Plaza de Armas lies on 2 de Mayo, a few blocks inland from the spot on the Pan-American Highway, where buses pause for passengers to get on or off. All buses heading south from Lima or north to Lima on the Pan-American Highway pass through Cañete. This is one of the most important homes of the most representative liquor from Peru: the Pisco.

Cerro Azul, Peru is a district north of the city centre San Vicente de Cañete.

The first inhabitants of these lands were the Huarcos. Later, the area was inhabited by descendants of slaves forced to work on the plantations. The slaves and their descendants lived here. The slaves arrived from Guinea, the Congo, and Angola, brought to the Peruvian coast during the seventeenth and eighteenth centuries to work in the cotton and sugar cane fields and in the vineyards.

It also has a district called Asia which has a lot of beaches which people from Lima rent houses and there is also a mall called Sur Plaza Boulevard.
