= Santa Cruz de Flores District =

Coordinates: 12.6195°S 76.6415°W

Santa Cruz de Flores
- District
- Interactive map of Santa Cruz de Flores
- Country: Peru
- Region: Lima
- Province: Cañete
- Founded: December 27, 1922
- Capital: Santa Cruz de Flores

Government
  - Mayor: Pedro Dagoberto Riega Guerra

Area
  - Total: 100.06 km^{2} (38.63 sq mi)
- Elevation: 85 m (279 ft)

Population (2017)
  - Total: 3,103
  - Density: 31.01/km^{2} (80.32/sq mi)
- Time zone: UTC-5 (PET)
- UBIGEO: 150515

Santa Cruz de Flores District is one of sixteen districts of the province Cañete in Peru.
