= Pacarán District =

Coordinates: 12.8662°S 76.0545°W

Pacarán
- District
- Interactive map of Pacarán
- Country: Peru
- Region: Lima
- Province: Cañete
- Capital: Pacarán

Government
  - Mayor: Julio Cesar Chanca Chupallo

Area
  - Total: 258.72 km^{2} (99.89 sq mi)
- Elevation: 700 m (2,300 ft)

Population (2017)
  - Total: 1,686
  - Density: 6.517/km^{2} (16.88/sq mi)
- Time zone: UTC-5 (PET)
- UBIGEO: 150511

Pacarán District is one of sixteen districts of the province Cañete in Peru.
