= Zúñiga District =

Coordinates: 12.8599°S 76.0226°W

Zúñiga
- District
- Interactive map of Zúñiga
- Country: Peru
- Region: Lima
- Province: Cañete
- Founded: December 13, 1942
- Capital: Zúñiga

Government
  - Mayor: Miguel Angel Gutierrez Luyo

Area
  - Total: 198.01 km^{2} (76.45 sq mi)
- Elevation: 802 m (2,631 ft)

Population (2017)
  - Total: 1,314
  - Density: 6.636/km^{2} (17.19/sq mi)
- Time zone: UTC-5 (PET)
- UBIGEO: 150516

Zúñiga District is one of sixteen districts of the province Cañete in Peru.
