= Incahuasi, Lima =

Archaeological site in Peru

Incahuasi
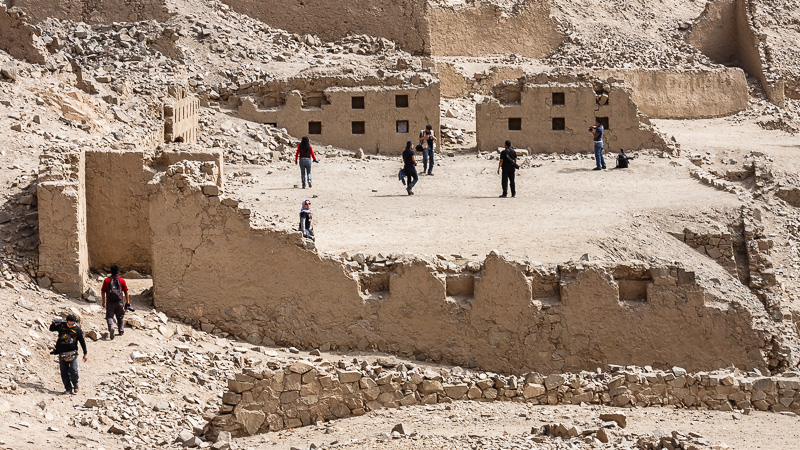
- Tourists in one of the structures at Incahuasi.

- Location within Peru
- 13.0237°S 76.1748°W
- Type: Settlement
- Cultures: Inca
- Location: Lunahuaná District, Lima Region

Incahuasi or Incawasi (possibly from Quechua inka Inca, wasi house) is an archaeological site in Peru. It is located in the Lima Region, Cañete Province, Lunahuaná District.
