= San Antonio District, Cañete =

Peruvian district in Cañete

Coordinates: 12.6437°S 76.6516°W

San Antonio District
- District
- Coat of arms
- Interactive map of San Antonio District
- Country: Peru
- Region: Lima
- Province: Cañete
- Founded: December 27, 1922
- Capital: San Antonio

Government
  - Mayor: Esteban Jesús Agapito Ramos (2019-2022)

Area
  - Total: 37.31 km^{2} (14.41 sq mi)
- Elevation: 36 m (118 ft)

Population (2017)
  - Total: 4,343
  - Density: 116.4/km^{2} (301.5/sq mi)
- Time zone: UTC-5 (PET)
- UBIGEO: 150513
- Website: munisanantonio.gob.pe

San Antonio District is one of sixteen districts of the province Cañete in Peru.
