= Coayllo District =

Coordinates: 12.7275°S 76.4598°W

Coayllo Quwayllu
- District
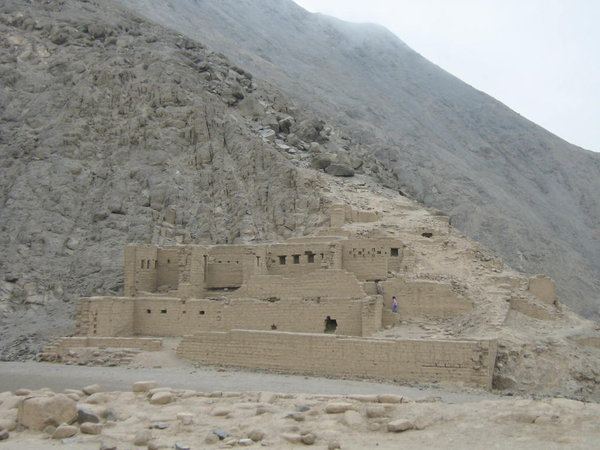
- The ruins of Uquira

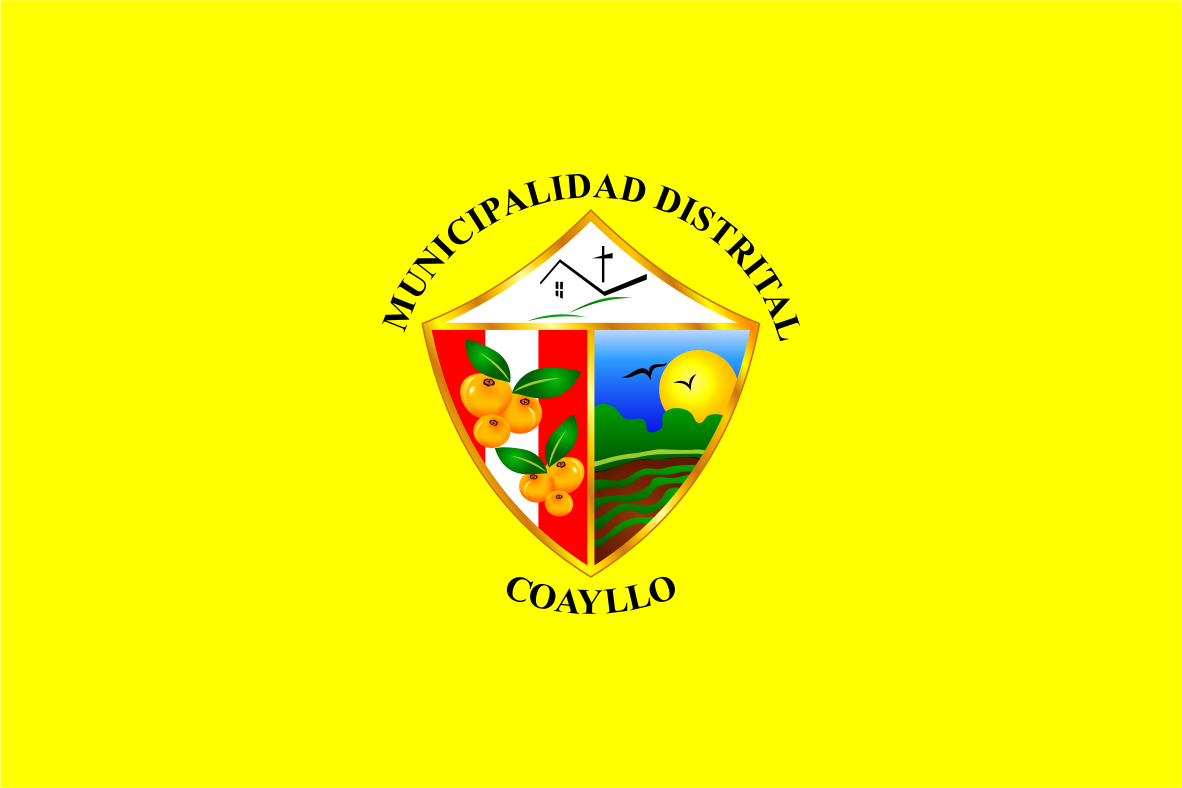
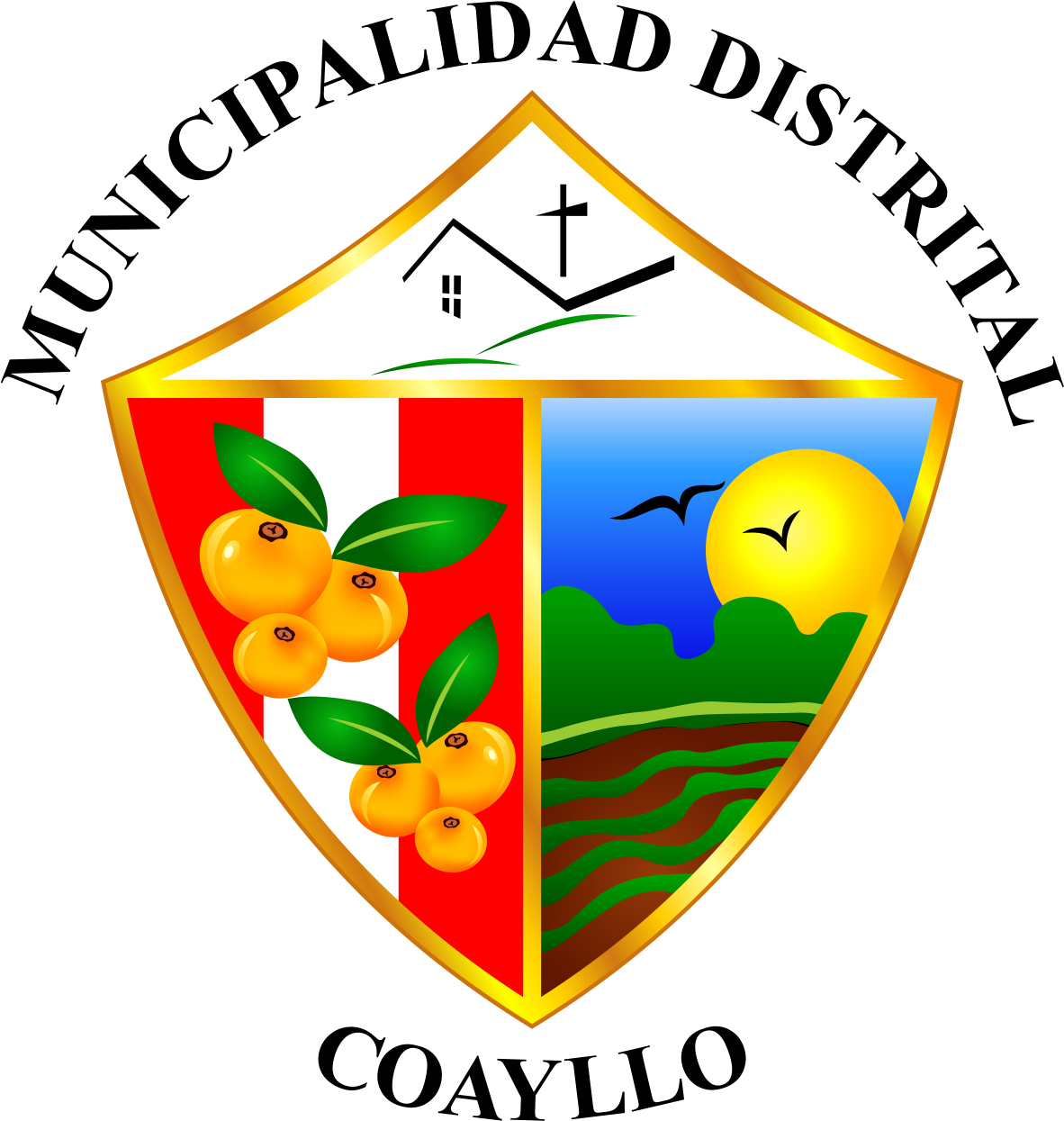
- Flag Coat of arms
- Interactive map of Coayllo
- Country: Peru
- Region: Lima
- Province: Cañete
- Founded: July 28, 1821
- Capital: Coayllo

Government
  - Mayor: Alexander Chuquizuta Huapaya

Area
  - Total: 590.99 km^{2} (228.18 sq mi)
- Elevation: 225 m (738 ft)

Population (2017)
  - Total: 1,043
  - Density: 1.765/km^{2} (4.571/sq mi)
- Time zone: UTC-5 (PET)
- UBIGEO: 150506

Coayllo District is one of sixteen districts of the province Cañete in Peru.
