= San Vicente de Cañete District =

Coordinates: 13.0777°S 76.3874°W

San Vicente de Cañete
- District
- Interactive map of San Vicente de Cañete
- Country: Peru
- Region: Lima
- Province: Cañete
- Capital: San Vicente de Cañete

Government
  - Mayor: Segundo Constantino Díaz De la Cruz

Area
  - Total: 513.15 km^{2} (198.13 sq mi)
- Elevation: 38 m (125 ft)

Population (2017)
  - Total: 54,775
  - Density: 106.74/km^{2} (276.46/sq mi)
- Time zone: UTC-5 (PET)
- UBIGEO: 150501

San Vicente de Cañete District is one of sixteen districts of Cañete Province in Peru.

The capital is San Vicente de Cañete.
