= Cañete province =

Province of Peru

Cañete
- Province
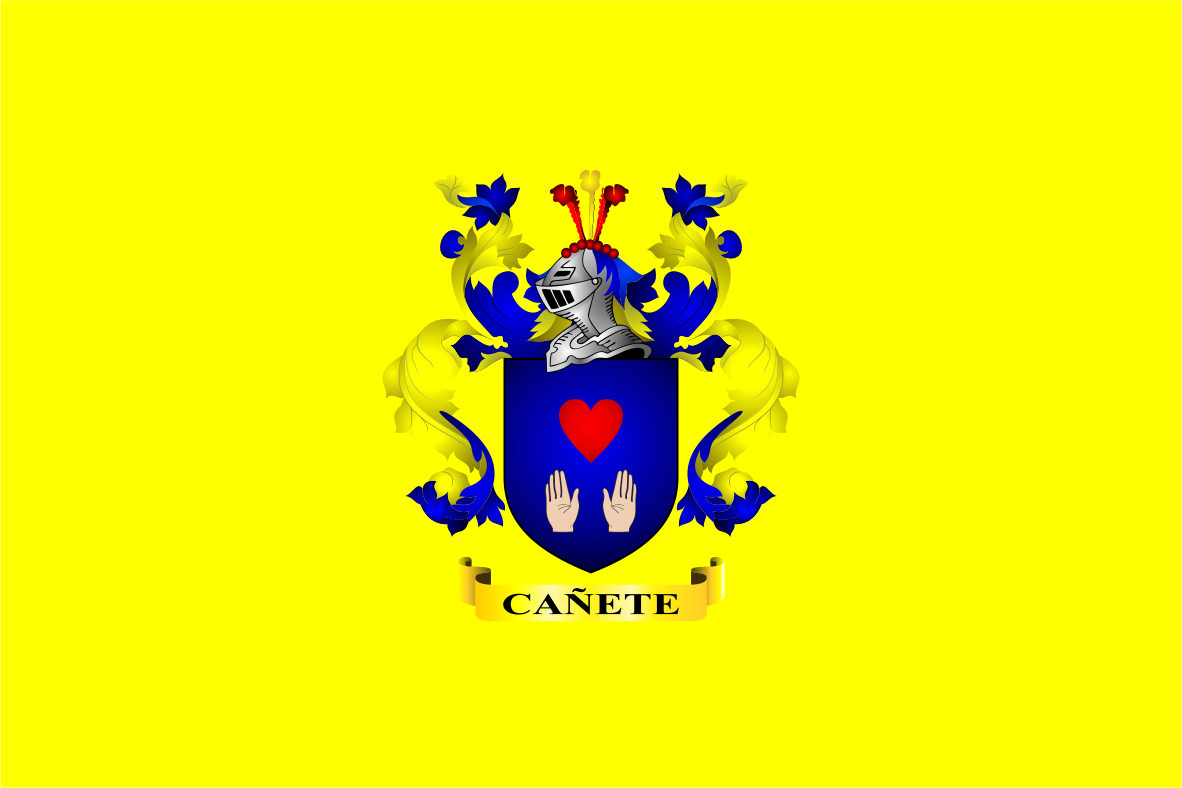
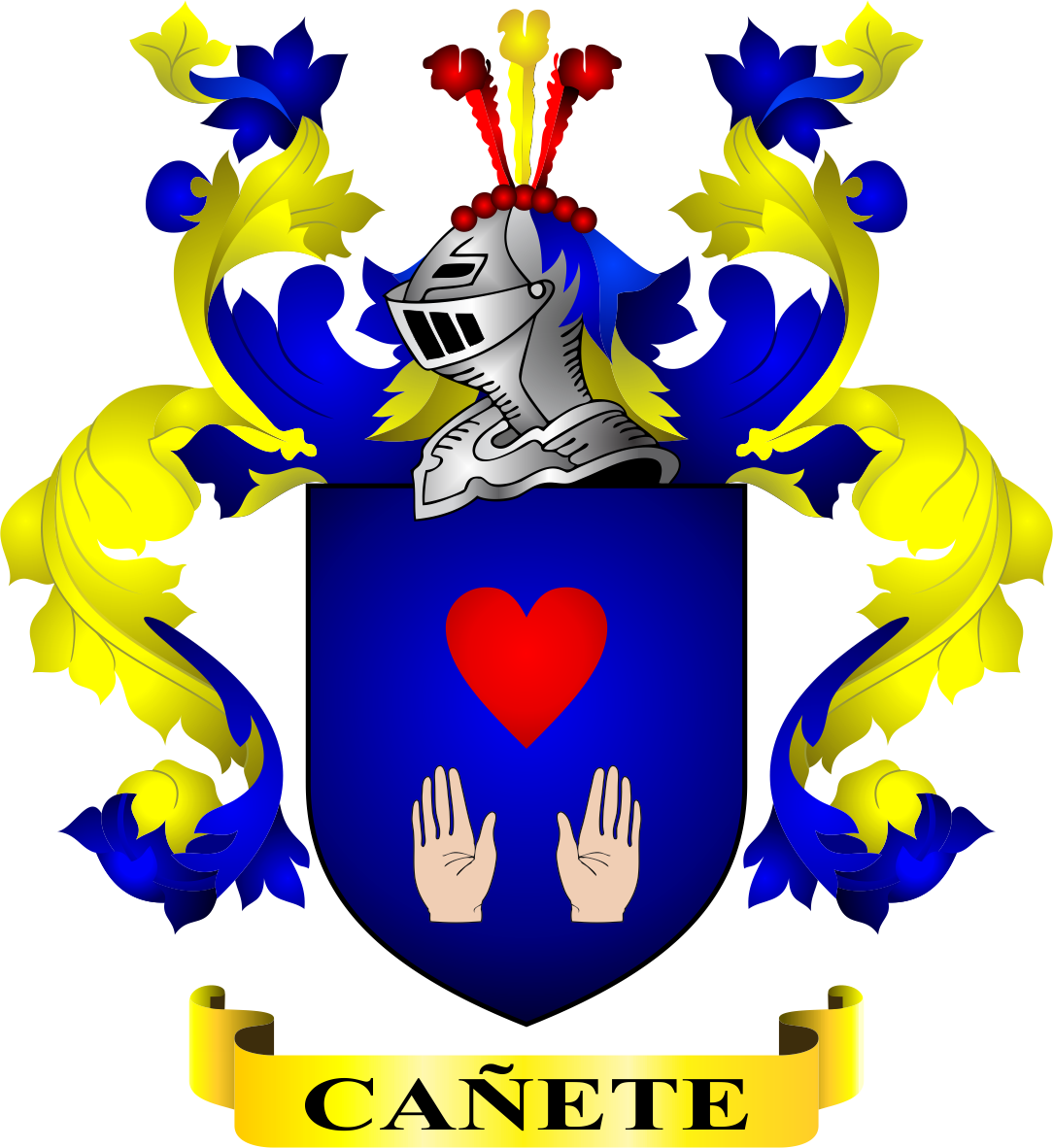
- Flag Coat of arms

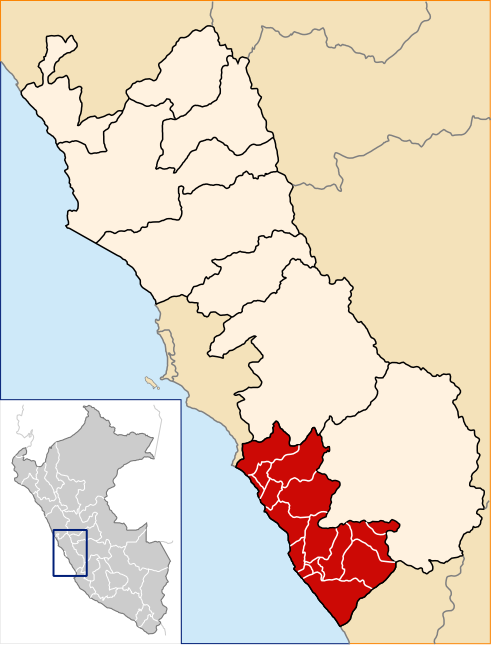
- Location of Cañete in Lima
- Coordinates: 13.078474°S 76.383905°W
- Country: Peru
- Department: Lima
- Capital: San Vicente de Cañete

Government
  - Mayor: Segundo Constantino Díaz De la Cruz (2019–2022)

Area
  - Total: 4,577.16 km^{2} (1,767.25 sq mi)

Population
  - Total: 240,013
  - Density: 52.4371/km^{2} (135.811/sq mi)
- UBIGEO: 1505
- Website: www.municanete.gob.pe

Cañete is a province of the department of Lima, Peru. From the administrative point of view of the Catholic Church in Peru, it forms part of the Territorial Prelature of Yauyos. It is bordered by the province of Lima to the north, the Ica Region to the south, the provinces of Huarochirí and Yauyos to the east, and the Pacific Ocean to the west. Its capital is the town of San Vicente de Cañete District.

San Luis is the capital of Afro-Peruvian folklore. Is the most populated province in the department, and its third most important province (after Lima and Huaura).

== Climate ==
The weather of the province's coastal area has two well-defined seasons:

- The sunny season, with temperatures of around 30 °C (86.4 °F), during daytime.
- The "sunless" season (May–December), during which the sun is covered by clouds. The extreme humidity causes a sensation of cold during this season, even if the temperature never gets lower than 11 °C (51.8 °F).

== Political division ==
The province is divided into sixteen districts (Spanish: distritos, singular: distrito):

- San Vicente de Cañete (seat)
- Asia
- Calango
- Cerro Azul
- Chilca
- Coayllo
- Imperial
- Lunahuaná
- Mala
- Nuevo Imperial
- Pacarán
- Quilmaná
- San Antonio
- San Luis
- Santa Cruz de Flores
- Zúñiga

== Attractions ==
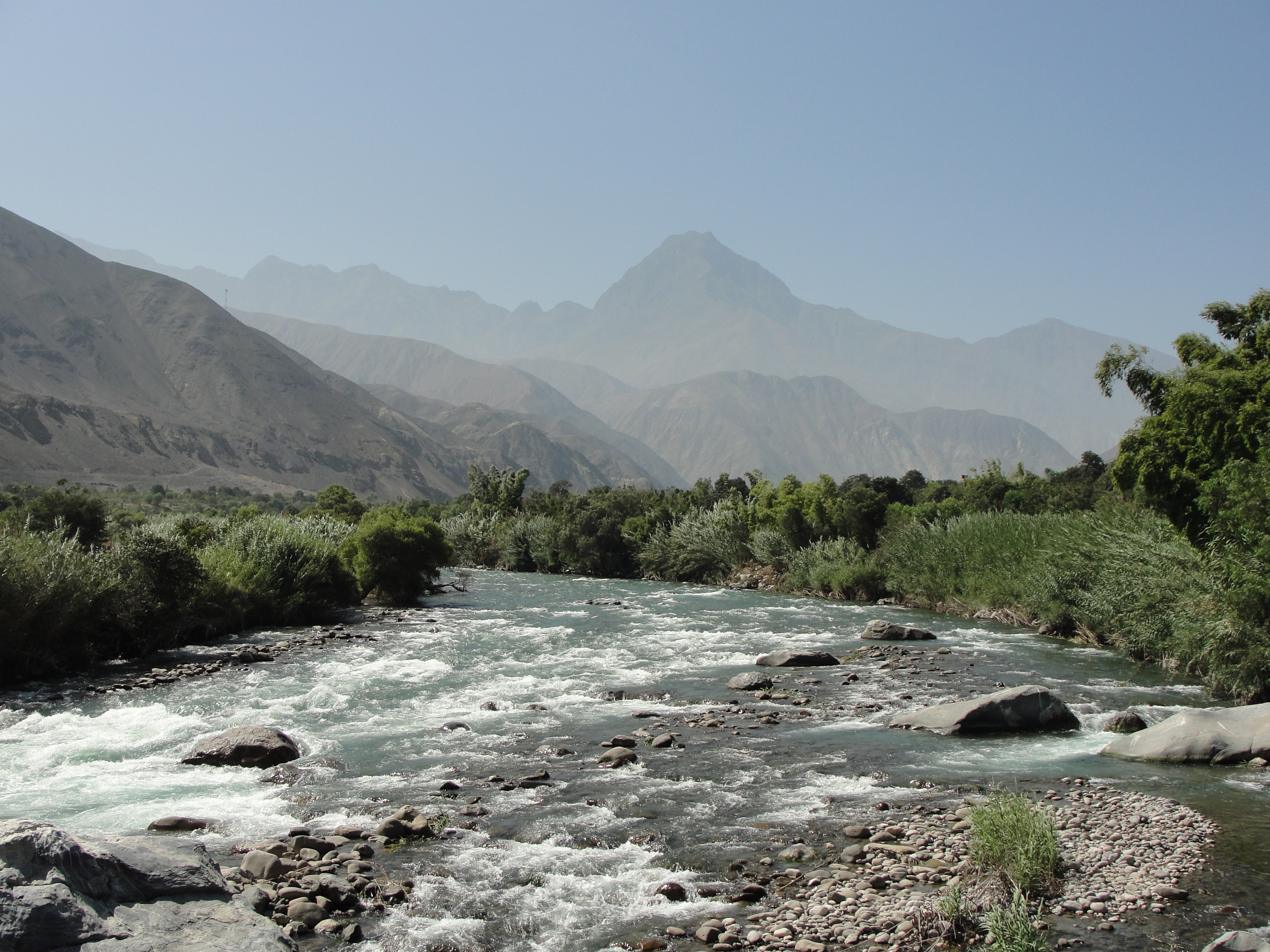
Cañete River

The coast of Cañete, with beaches such as Asia, Chilca, Puerto Viejo, León Dormido, Costa del Campo, Totoritas, Chocaya, Chepeconde, Puerto Fiel, Gallardo and Cerro Azul, is one of the province's main touristic attractions. The pleasant valley of Lunahuaná, a paradise for adventure sports lovers, is just half an hour from San Vicente de Cañete. The main attraction is the fast running Cañete River, which features rapids up to Class IV. Each year, the valley hosts a festival involving rafting, trekking, gliding, mountain biking and fishing competitions. There are a few annual festivals in Cañete. The most important ones are Festival of Black Art in late August and Adventure Sports Festival in Lunahuaná, held in February.

== See also ==
- Afro-Peruvian
- Incahuasi
- Musica Negra
- Nueva LIMA
- Huaura Province
- Susana Baca
- Teodoro Fernández Meyzan
- Javier Alvarado
- Manuel Donayre
- Paloma (archaeological site): remains of an ancient settlement in Chilca District
