= Lunahuaná =

- Town
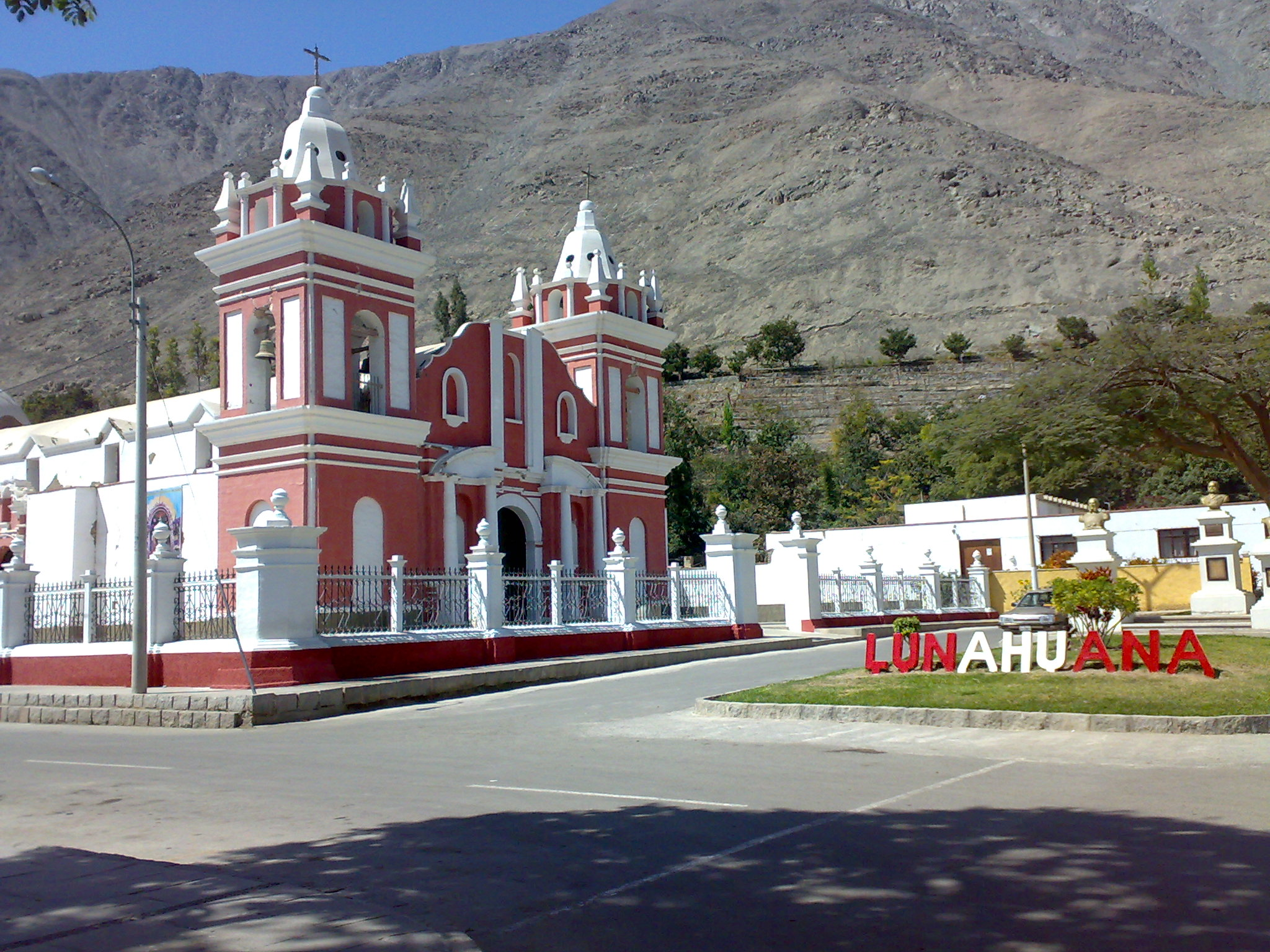
- Plaza de Armas of Lunahuaná

- Location within Peru
- Coordinates: 12°57′49″S 76°08′28″W
- Country: Peru
- Region: Lima
- Province: Cañete
- District: Lunahuaná
- Established: August 4, 1821

Government
  - Mayor: Noe Benito Salazar Villarroel (2019-2022)

Area
  - Total: 500.33 km^{2} (193.18 sq mi)
- Elevation: 476 m (1,562 ft)

Population (2017)
  - Total: 4,393
  - Density: 8.780/km^{2} (22.74/sq mi)
- Time zone: UTC-5 (PET)
- UBIGEO: 150508

Lunahuaná is a small town in the Cañete Province in Peru. The town lies about 187 km south of Lima in the Lunahuaná valley at the bank of Cañete River. Due to the unique landscape, Lunahuaná is a very popular destination for both Peruvians and foreign tourists. According to the 2017 census, there were 4,393 inhabitants.

== Gastronomy ==
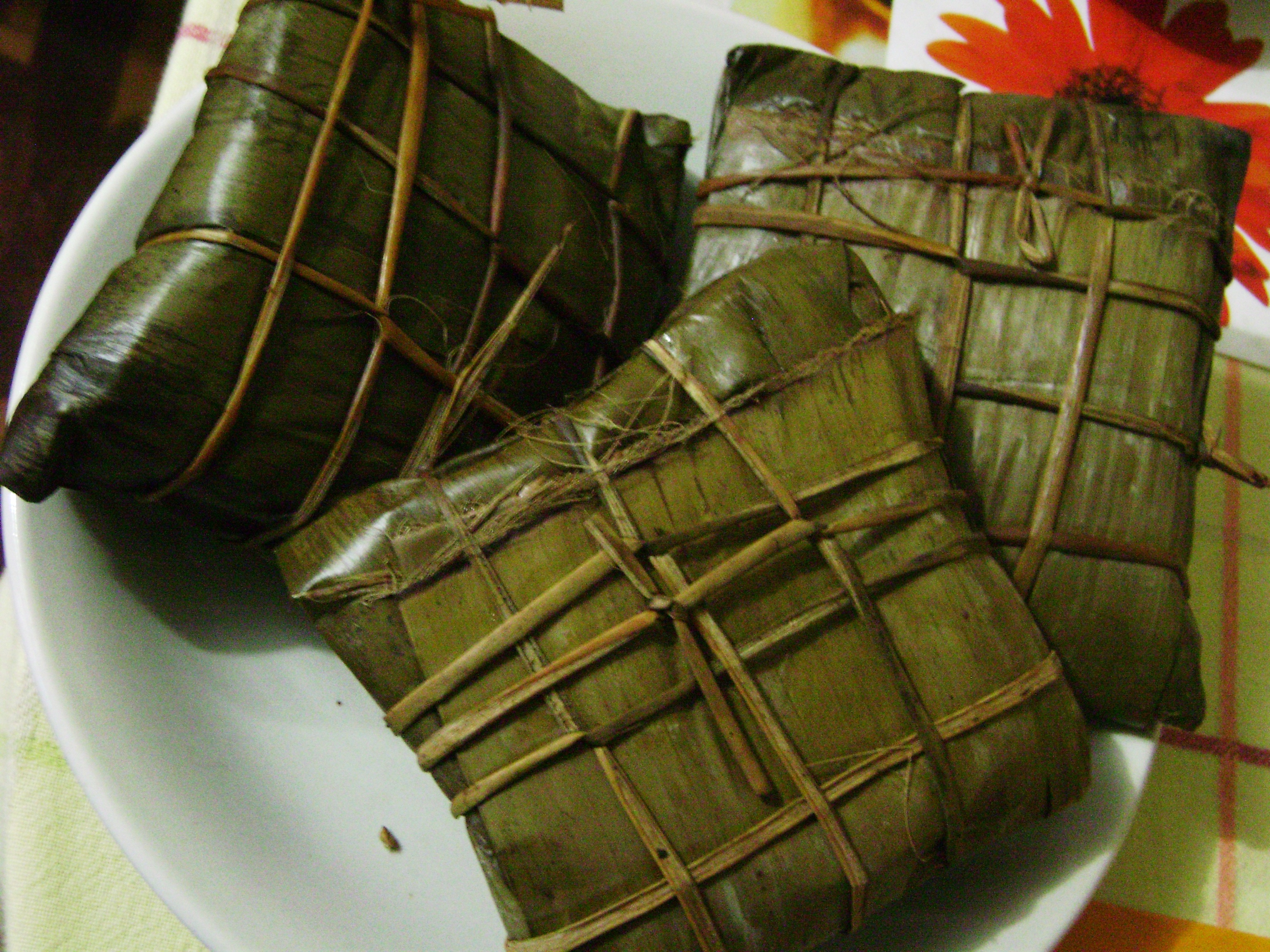
An image of a well-prepared tamal of Lunahuaná

In Lunahuaná you can taste local dishes prepared in clay pots and wooden stoves such as: Shrimp (various styles), chola soup, duck with rice, tamales, chicharrones, adobo pork, carapulcra, pachamanca, guinea pigs and rabbits.

== History ==
The history of Lunahuaná dates back to the origins of Peru. There is evidence that the first settlers arrived in this area between 6000 and 2000 BC However, it was during the expansion of the Inca Empire that Lunahuaná became the second largest city led by Pachacútec.

The name Lunahuaná might be derived from Quechua (runa man, mankind, wasi punishment). The Lunahuaná valley was the target of Inca conquests. First, the Guarco, or Huarco, settled in the valley. Due to the natural obstacles of the wild Cañete River the campaigns of the Inca took three to four years. Still today there are the ruins of the fortress Inka Wasi eight kilometers from the successful conquest. Tupac Yupanqui was part of these campaigns. Lunahuaná was officially founded in 1821 as a market town of Don José de San Martín.

== Points of interest ==
In the center of the village there is a Catholic church, situated at the main square, which was built by the Order of the Franciscans in 1690. In 1972 the church was declared a historical monument.

The main attraction of Lunahuaná is the Cañete river. It is a popular destination for whitewater boat tours (rafting). Other popular activities include hiking, mountain biking, paragliding and fishing. Inka Wasi is situated about eight kilometers from Lunahuaná. The complex is divided into three sections, the area of the Inca (El barrio incaico), a religious center called Qullqa (Colcas, El barrio de las colcas religioso) and finally there is the palace of the Inca (El palacio del Inca).

In 2015, an official pisco trail started in Lunahuaná which is the first of its kind in the Lima Region. This trail adds to the other four official pisco trails located in Ica, Arequipa, Moquegua and Tacna. The trail includes five wineries approved by the Ministry of Foreign Trade and Tourism (Mincetur). The pisco trail first stops at the winery D’La Cruz (kilometer 33, Annex Jerome). This winery was first founded in 2002 by Johan De La Cruz Peña, its annual production is 13,000 liters of pisco. The next stop is Langla, located at kilometer 35.5, at the winery El Sol owned by Marco Martínez. It was founded in the early twentieth century and its annual production is 8,000 liters of pisco. The trail continues to Condoray, located at kilometer 39.5, where Jose Antonio Espinoza Peña continues the family tradition, started by his grandfather Benedicto Peña, in the winery Santa María, which dates back to 1929. This winery reaches a production of 50,000 liters per year. Winery de la Motta is next in the trail tour, located at kilometer 40.5. It was created in 2005 by Sergio De La Mota. Its production volume is around 20,000 liters.

The last stop in this pisco trail is the winery Viña Los Reyes at kilometer 41. It is the oldest winery in Lunahuaná since 1896 and is administered by Isabel Gonzales del Valle, widow of Domingo Alvarado Reyes. It produced 15,000 liters in 2014. All the wineries of this district, Cañete, have tasting rooms, the latest technologies, areas of accommodation and restaurants.

== Gallery ==
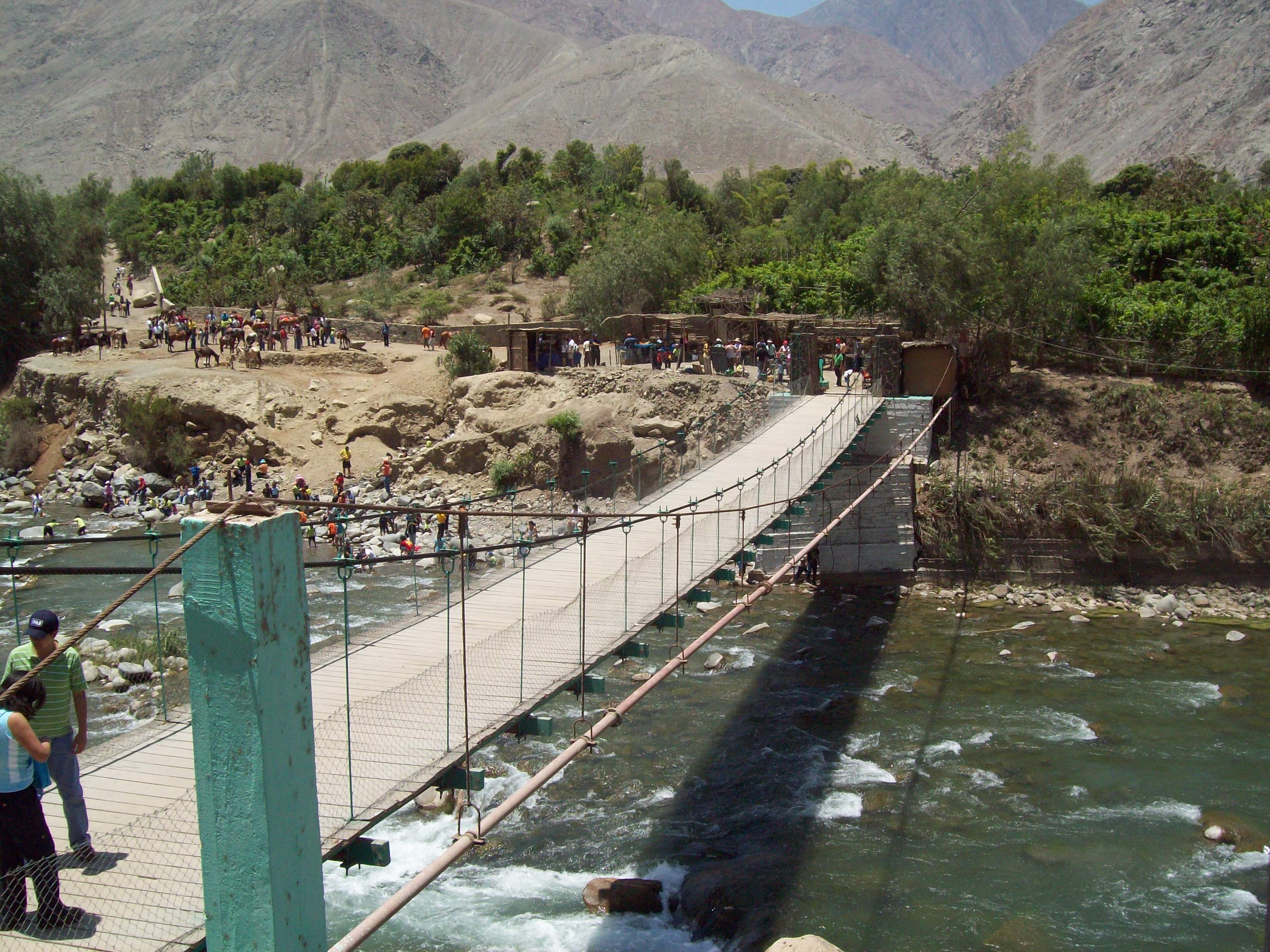
A bridge near a river

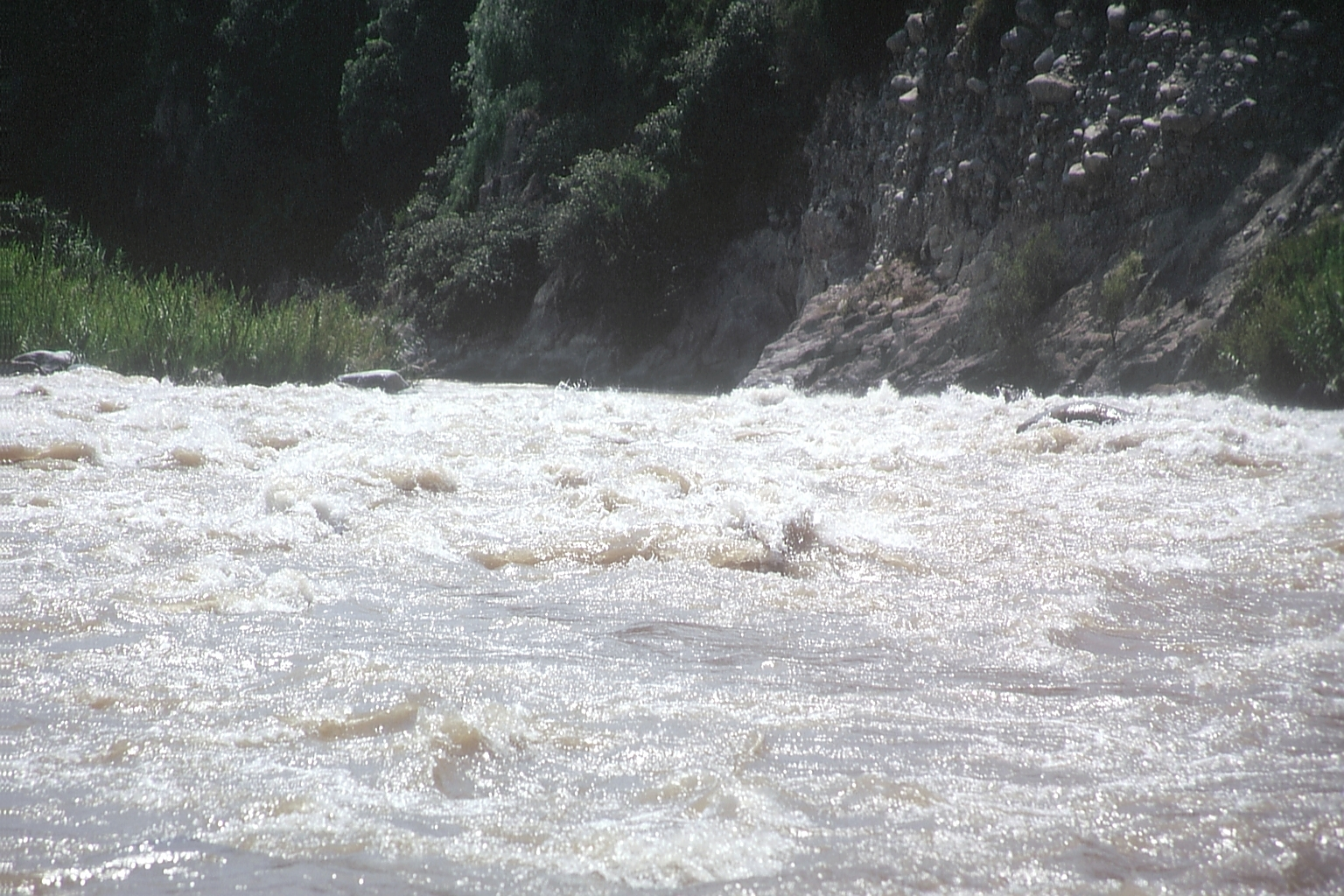
Cañete River

== See also ==
- Lunahuaná District
- Cañete Province
