= Imperial District =

Coordinates: 13.0610°S 76.3529°W

Imperial
- District
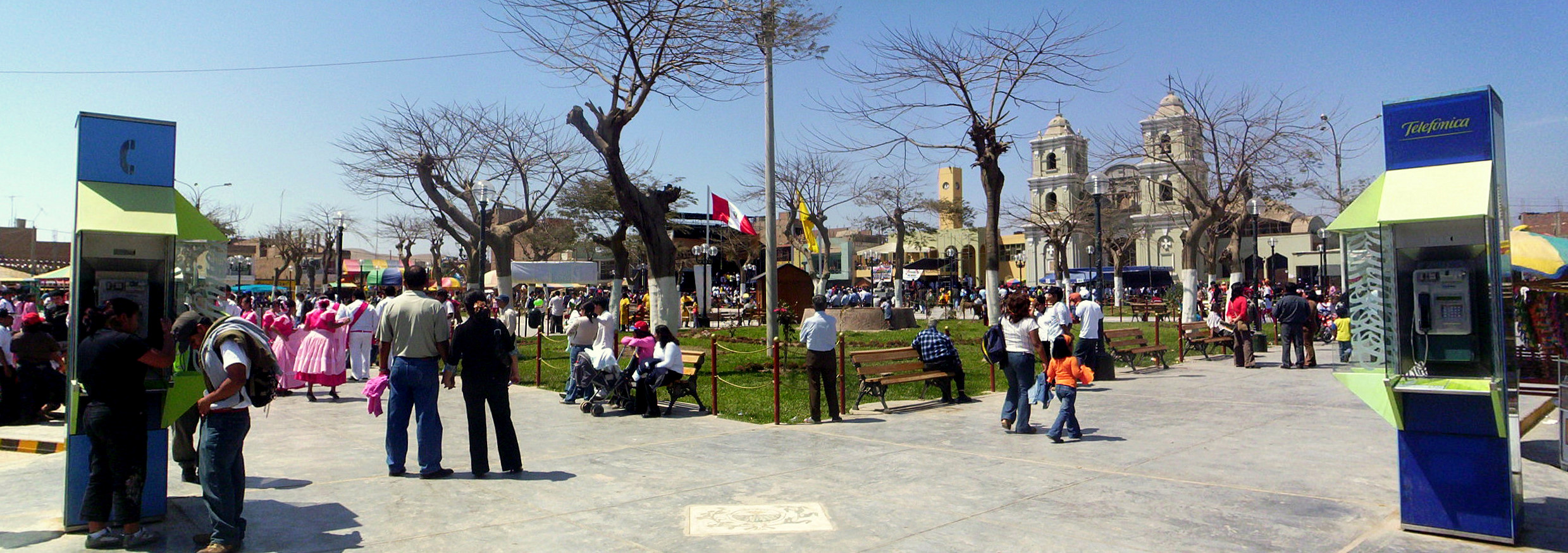
- Plaza de Armas of Imperial

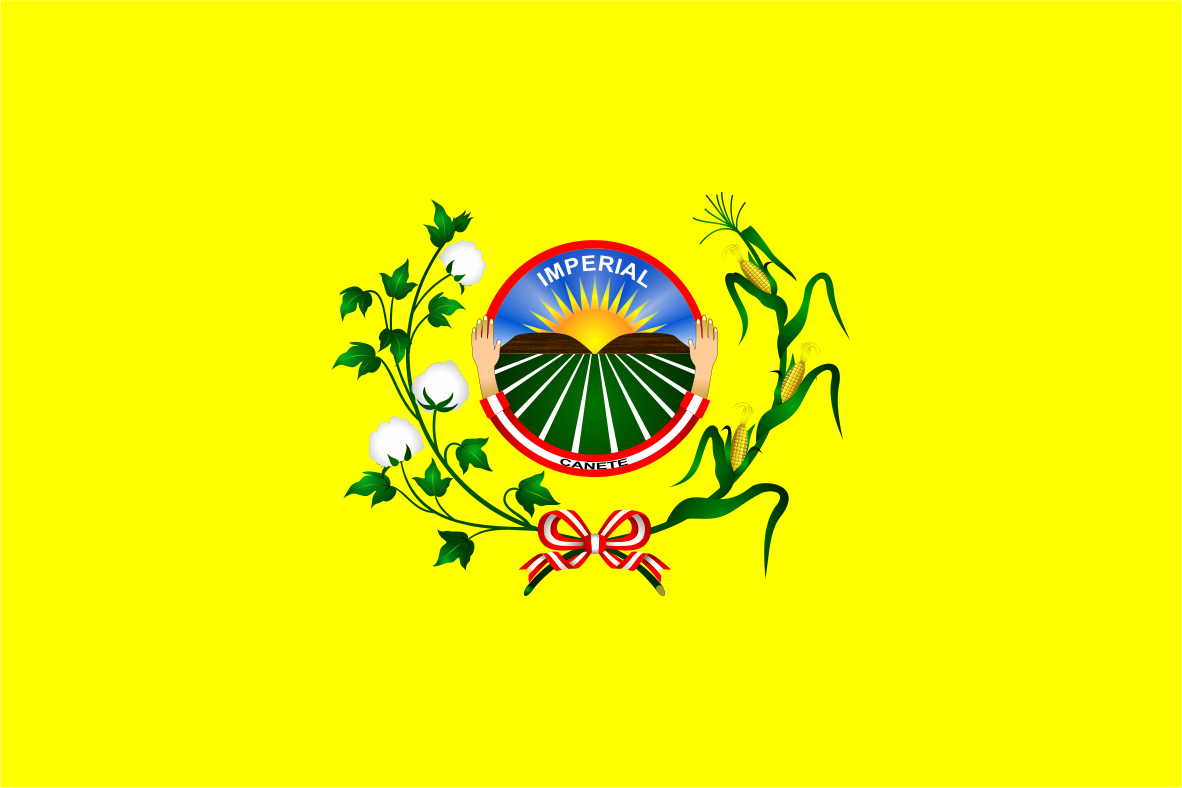
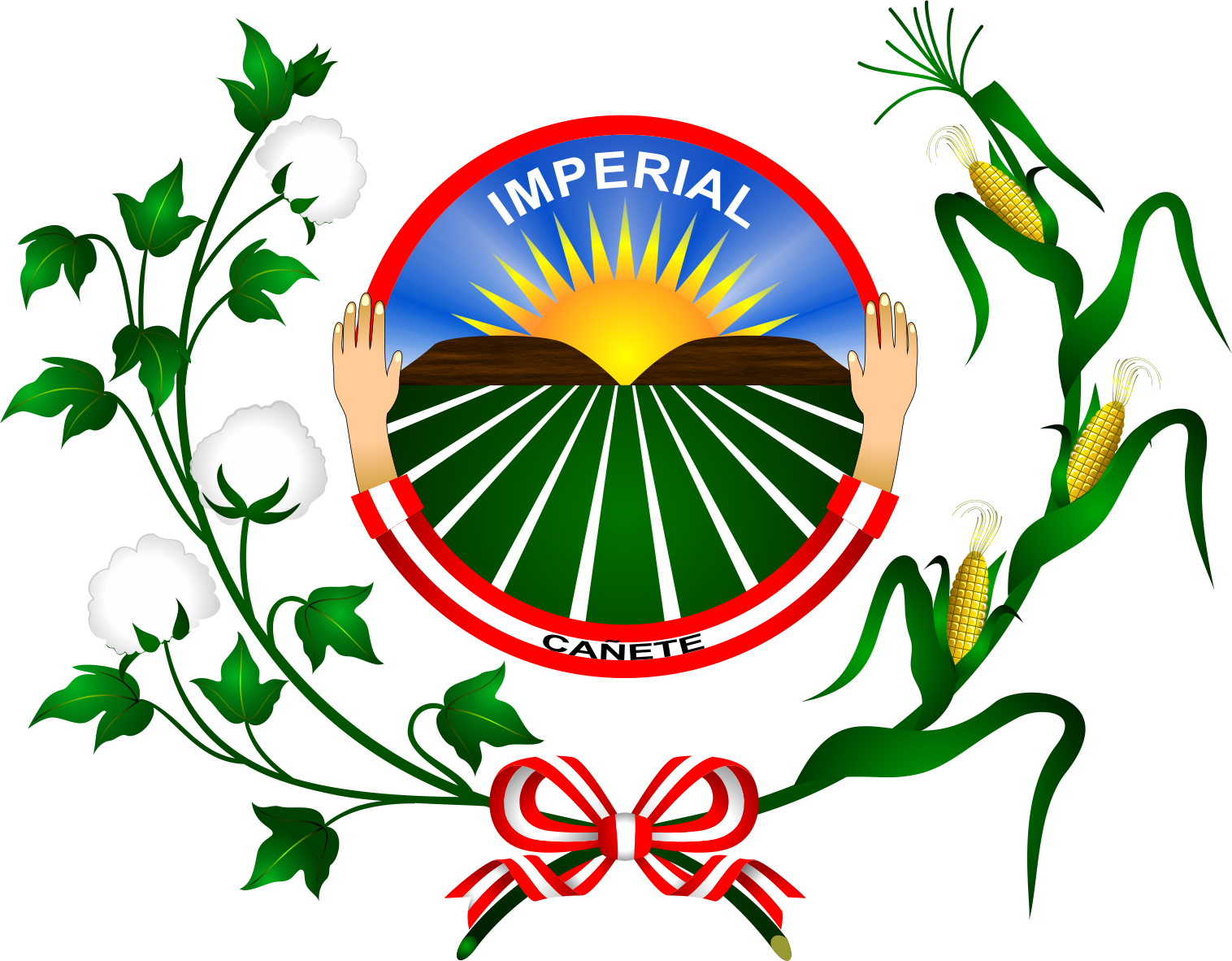
- Flag Coat of arms
- Interactive map of Imperial
- Country: Peru
- Region: Lima
- Province: Cañete
- Founded: November 15, 1909
- Capital: Imperial

Government
  - Mayor: Elias Alcala Rosas

Area
  - Total: 53.16 km^{2} (20.53 sq mi)
- Elevation: 85 m (279 ft)

Population (2017)
  - Total: 38,925
  - Density: 732.2/km^{2} (1,896/sq mi)
- Time zone: UTC-5 (PET)
- UBIGEO: 150507

Imperial District is one of sixteen districts of the province Cañete in Peru.
