= Nuevo Imperial District =

Coordinates: 13.0762°S 76.3178°W

Nuevo Imperial
- District
- Interactive map of Nuevo Imperial
- Country: Peru
- Region: Lima
- Province: Cañete
- Founded: June 22, 1962
- Capital: Nuevo Imperial

Government
  - Mayor: Alex Salas (2019-2022)

Area
  - Total: 329.3 km^{2} (127.1 sq mi)
- Elevation: 132 m (433 ft)

Population (2017)
  - Total: 26,233
  - Density: 79.66/km^{2} (206.3/sq mi)
- Time zone: UTC-5 (PET)
- UBIGEO: 150510

Nuevo Imperial District is one of sixteen districts of the province Cañete in Peru.

Its boundaries are:

- North: District Quilmaná.
- South: District Lunahuaná.
- East: District Lunahuaná.
- West: Imperial district and district of San Vicente de Cañete.
