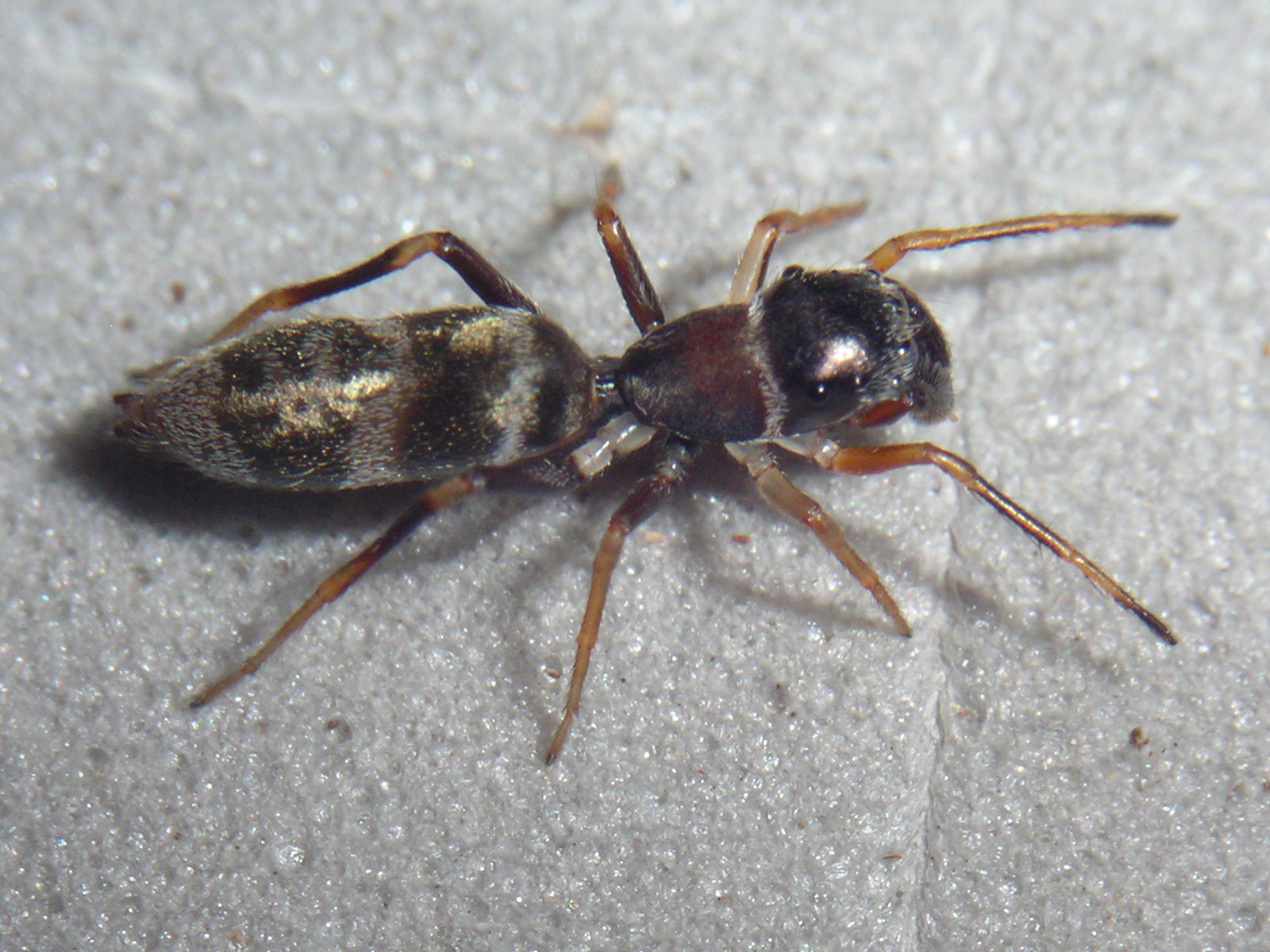
- Female Zuniga sp. in Ecuador

Scientific classification
- Kingdom: Animalia
- Phylum: Arthropoda
- Subphylum: Chelicerata
- Class: Arachnida
- Order: Araneae
- Infraorder: Araneomorphae
- Family: Salticidae
- Subfamily: Salticinae
- Genus: Zuniga; Peckham & Peckham, 1892

Type species
- Z. laeta (Peckham & Peckham, 1892)

Species
- Z. laeta (Peckham & Peckham, 1892); Z. magna Peckham & Peckham, 1892

Synonyms
- Arindas Mello-Leitão, 1933; Simprulloides Mello-Leitão, 1933

= Zuniga (spider) =

Genus of spiders

Zuniga is a genus of ant mimicking jumping spiders that was first described by George and Elizabeth Peckham in 1892. It is a senior synonym of Arindas and Simprulloides.

As of 2026, the genus contains two accepted species:

- Zuniga laeta (Peckham & Peckham, 1892) - Colombia, Brazil, Argentina
- Zuniga magna Peckham & Peckham, 1892 - Mexico, Costa Rica, Panama, Colombia, Guyana, French Guiana, Peru, Brazil, Argentina
