= Paloma (archaeological site) =

Archaeological site in Peru

Paloma is an archaeological site in Peru, located 65 km south of Lima in Chilca District, Cañete Province. Based on radiocarbon dating, it was a village from roughly 5700 to 2800 BCE. This corresponds to the late Preceramic IV and Preceramic V periods. It is one of the earliest villages in the Americas that archaeologists have been able to date stratigraphically. It is on the north edge of the Chilca River valley, in hills separating the main valley from a dry canyon called Quebrada de los Perdidos. The inhabitants would have been "within easy walking distance" from both the Chilca River itself (7-8 km south) and the Pacific coast, 3-4 km west. The site is bounded by coastal hills on the north and south. Paloma lies on the edge of the lomas - areas where moisture from fog allows plants to grow in an otherwise arid region. However, how the ancient settlement got access to fresh water is not clear. There are several possibilities: first, the inhabitants could have dug wells down to the water table. Second, a spring located about five minutes' walk east of the village may have provided water (it is possibly intermittent and was recorded by archaeologists in June 1976 but was not afterward). Finally, sand-lined pits may have been used to trap moisture from fog.

== Overview ==
The site contains the buried remains of reed huts. Crushed white shells cover the ground in an area of 15 hectares, making the site easily detectable. The densest midden deposits are found on the edge of a small canyon near the western end of the site - this area appears to have served as a garbage dump for at least part of Paloma's existence. Food debris and broken artifacts are densely accumulated here.

The midden's thickness varies across the site. There are about a dozen surface concentrations, which slightly overlap the clusters of houses and burials. Subsurface concentrations, on the other hand, are relatively continuous throughout the site. The largest concentrations is called "Unit 1", which extends over an area of 6500 square meters and ranges from a few centimeters to about a meter in depth. Unit 1 is divided into 7 main strata, from top to bottom:

Layers at Paloma (from Quilter, 1989)
Level	Dating	Description
Level 100	Not given	Light gray windblown surface dust
Level 120	Not given	Medium gray surface dust mixed with darker ash, shell debris, and stone tool fragments
Level 200	5200-4600 BP	Dense crushed mussel shells in light gray, ashy matrix
Level 300	5500-5200 BP	Moderately dense crushed mussel shells; coprolites; light gray ash; lots of plant remains
Level 400	7000-5500 BP	Moderately concentrated dark gray ash mixed with plant parts and, usually, few shell fragments; sometimes shells are densely concentrated and mixed with burnt hearth stones
Level 500	7000-5500 BP	Concentrated, dark gray ash with few other contacts; usually in contact with pampa (powdered rock)
Level 600	Lowest extreme dated to c. 7735 BP	Ashy yellow pampa dust mixed with some shell, ash, and charcoal; difficult to distinguish from true pampa

These layers are likely present throughout the site, not just in Unit 1. They are arbitrary and are not measured from any fixed point, and they are not always all present - for example, in some areas on the east side of Unit 1, Level 500 deposits are found directly below the surface. In Unit 1, the predominant strata are Levels 200, 300, 400, and 500; these four layers also contain most of the houses, burials, and artifacts.

== Timeline ==
The site is dated to 6500 radiocarbon years before present. This is about the same time as the final deglaciation of the Laurentide Ice Sheet, and the rising of worldwide sea levels to their present-day levels. Nearby coastal regions may have been home to earlier settlements that were inundated by the rising sea levels at this time.

Paloma's population increased during the Middle and Late Preceramic periods. This was either because more children were surviving until adulthood, multiple local populations were combining into a single settlement, or both. The health and life expectancy of Paloma's residents also seems to have improved over time - skeletal remains from later burials show fewer signs of stress and include a lower proportion of young people.

At the same time, gradual overexploitation of the fog-watered lomas led to a decline in plant resources and water production. The local subsistence economy became increasingly focused on maritime resources, particularly during the last phase of occupation.

Based on an analysis of human physical remains at Paloma, there was a distinct new group that came to occupy the site during Levels 200 and 300.

The worldwide climatic optimum ended around 3000 BCE. In South America, conditions became drier and more unpredictable.

During the final period of occupation, the growth rate at Paloma was decreasing, while the overall population of the region was increasing. The inhabitants of Paloma eventually moved to the nearby Chilca River valley.

The settlement at Paloma probably ended around 2500 BCE. However, the site has probably been occasionally occupied since then. Several ears of maize found buried along with some sort of canine in 1979 were estimated by radiocarbon dating to have an age of 1,830 years - i.e. around 150 CE.

== Structures ==
=== Houses ===
Huts ranged in shape from circles to ovals to quadrilaterals. Floors were usually sloped towards the center, and they were dug down 25 to 60 centimeters so that the floor level was below ground. The basic support for the huts was provided by a frame of willow and cane (Gynerium sagittatum) poles, which were sometimes bound together by reed twine into groups of two or four for extra strength. Often, there were stones wedged in at the poles' bases for extra supports. The poles may have been further supported by parallel cross poles, forming a grid or lattice structure. Loose bunches of grass, sedges, or reeds were then stuffed between the poles to provide insulation. It's likely, though not completely certain, that large reed mats were then thrown on top to provide extra insulation. The floors, on the other hand, were definitely covered with them - some of the mats have been found like this.

The shape of the roof is not entirely certain. At first, archaeologists assumed that the huts were dome-shaped like the ones at the nearby Chilca I site, but the well-preserved House 101 had a collapsed section of latticework lying on the floor, which led Engel to propose that it was originally a flat, square roof on top of a hut with a round base.

Many of the huts have an extra outer wall extending out in an arc, always on the southwest side of the house. These most likely functioned as windbreaks to help insulate the house from cold winter winds - the prevailing winds today come from the southwest, and they probably did in ancient times as well. The area enclosed by these outer walls may have also been used as a storage area.

On average, the houses at Paloma were 10.9 square meters - which might seem small, but Paloma's residents would have spent most of their time outdoors, so they wouldn't have needed big houses. Additionally, sleeping close together would have helped provide more warmth on cold winter nights. Even today, the most basic of huts in the region often measure about 10 square meters.

=== Burials ===
One of the most important sources of information at Paloma is the numerous burials - not only do they reveal how Palomans buried their dead, but the physical remains also provide a source on health and mortality. Most of them were buried wrapped in a reed mat either below the floor of a house or outdoors. The soil and midden preserved the skeletons in good condition. Although not abundant, there were also small amounts of skin and muscle preserved in places where the wrappings protected them from disintegrating. Hair, brains, and internal organs were also found in some cases, but in most cases the only trace of internal organs was as stains in the soil. The relative lack of soft body parts can be explained by water seepage below ground, which happens in relatively damp lomas - better-preserved burials tend to be found in drier places. In general, deeper burials were better preserved because relatively less fog moisture seeped down that far.

Almost all Paloman burials seem to have been first-time burials, with only a few minor cases where they were later disturbed. Most burials were done in specifically-dug grass-lined pits below the floor of a house. There are also a couple of cases where infants were buried in abandoned storage pits. Towards the later part of Paloma's occupation, c. Level 200, another option for burial also appeared: instead of digging a burial pit, the dead were simply placed on the floor and then the house was destroyed. (A similar practice has also been noted at Chilca I, which took place at about the same time.)

Usually, the dead were posed with the knees tucked in toward the chest. Hands were often placed at the face or hips. Broken bones and cuts in hands and feet indicate that the bodies may have been forcibly positioned like this after death. Benfer and Edward suggested that the bodies may have been covered with salt before being buried. The presence of coprolites in some graves indicates that burial likely took place quickly after death.

A relatively high proportion of burials at Paloma are infants. According to Benfer, this is because relatively good preservation of burials at Paloma means that a relatively complete sample is available, and the proportion of infant burials is therefore accurately represented.

Grave goods are relatively scarce at Paloma. The most common items found in graves are things like ornaments and clothing. After the dead were placed in a grave, there may have been a ritual ceremony involving fire - singed burial wrappings indicate that hot hearth stones were taken from the fire and placed on top of the bundle. Once the grave was covered up with earth, people may have sometimes built a fire on top of it. Sometimes the graves were topped by a smooth beach pebble.

=== Others ===
At least 500 round storage pits were dug at Paloma, usually outside of huts and ranging from small ones 10 cm deep and 20 cm wide to large ones about a meter deep and wide. Some of the larger ones were lined with grass, probably so that their contents wouldn't be in contact with dirt - these may have been used to store food, but this is unclear. Most of the pits were empty when archaeologists came across them, indicating that they might have only been in use for short-term storage. The sheer number of storage pits dug at Paloma indicates that storage played an important role in the settlement's subsistence economy. Some small pits next to burials were also used for grave offerings.

Remains of hearths have also been found both in huts and outdoors. Inside the huts, ashes and carbonized twigs were found on the floor and may have been burned to provide warmth during cold foggy winters. Outdoors, large oval-shaped hearths covered in burnt cobbles probably served as cooking areas.

The garbage dump on the west may have also been used for food preparation and other activities at various times. The presence of burials and part of a house (House 102) in the lower layers of the area indicate that it only came to be used as a garbage dump later on.

To the northeast of the main midden, there are some partly-underground stone structures whose original purpose is unknown. A burial underneath one of them had cotton textiles and was radiocarbon dated to between 2170 and 1960 BCE, during the Late Preceramic period.

South of these structures and east of the midden, there are 36 sunken plots in the ground, each one about 2 square meters. These have not been fully studied so their exact purpose is unknown, but they may have been sunken garden plots taking advantage of the relatively high water table. Similar sunken garden plots are known from elsewhere in Peru. The plots here, though, may have been made after 2500 BCE, after Paloma was abandoned.

== Size and layout of the settlement ==
The total size of Paloma when it was a village is unknown. Excavations at Unit 1 in 1976 turned up 42 houses in 10% of the area, which would suggest a total of 420 houses, but according to Jeffrey Quilter that seems too high. According to Robert Benfer, Paloma was probably the largest settlement of the central Peruvian coast in its heyday. His estimates give a peak population of about 450 people during Level 300, which likely had the moistest climate based on the abundance of grasses preserved. In earlier periods, from 6500-5300 BP during Level 400, the same estimates would give Paloma a population of about 60. During Level 200, the final period of occupation, there would have been about 200 people.

In terms of physical layout, the village doesn't seem to have followed any real pattern. No large spaces suggesting a general plaza have been found. In general, though, it seems that new structures "never intrude[d] upon older ones" - once abandoned, the structures were not disturbed. This is a big part of why the remains at Paloma stayed preserved so well. John Greer also suggested that the village started at the middle of Unit 1 and then grew outward over time.

== Population ==
=== Health ===
Based on survivorship curves, about 42% of Palomans died in childhood. The highest rate of mortality was between ages 1 and 4.

There is a high proportion of female infant burials, increasing over time. Among non-infants, there is 150% as many males as females. This has led Benfer to conclude that the Palomans practiced female infanticide. This may have been done as a means of population control in response to a perceived scarcity of available resources.

Once surviving childhood, a Paloman could expect to live about 25 to 30 years. A handful of skeletons belonging to people in their 50s were also found. Unusually, the highest mortality rate for adult women at Paloma was in their 30s - in most pre-industrial societies, women's mortality peaks in their 20s because of death in childbirth. This may indicate that Palomans practiced delayed birthing, which is a fairly common way of population control.

In general, it appears that the people of Paloma became healthier and better adapted over time. Later skeletons have fewer growth arrest lines, which mark periods of impeded growth caused by malnourishment. However, these lines increase slightly during the last phase of occupation at Paloma, indicating increased stress during that period. The frequency of anemia also decreased over time, also indicating less stress in later periods. However, unlike growth arrest lines, anemia did not increase during the final stage of occupation - in fact, zero adults had active lesions caused by anemia in the latest burials.

Many of the skeletons showed that they had suffered from diseases like tuberculosis and carcinoma. Broken foot bones were also common.

Palomans of both sexes and all ages suffered from lower back inflammation, especially osteoarthritis. This was probably because they led active and physically taxing lives which involved lots of strenuous work, such as carrying heavy loads of mollusks from the beach to the village or carrying equipment from site to site.

Eight skeletons found at Paloma had surfer's ear - bone spurs in the inner ear caused by prolonged contact with cold water. Because all eight were male, this may indicate that fishing was mostly done by men at Paloma; however, the small sample size makes it impossible to generalize. The discrepancy could also be explained by a theory that women are less prone to developing surfer's ear than men.

Sexual dimorphism decreased at Paloma over time, as women got taller and more muscular. This may have been due to a difference in activity, with both men and women taking part in gathering fish and shellfish - which would require more upper body strength than previous foraging activities that may have been sex-specialized. It may also have been due to natural selection - taller, more muscular women may have been better adapted for survival and having more children. Finally, sexual selection may have also been behind this shift.

Only three carious lesions were present in people from Paloma - all in Level 300, which had the most evidence of grasses and carbohydrates. The low rate is typical of pre-agricultural populations. Enamel hypoplasia was fairly common on teeth.

Dental wear decreased over time, indicating a shift in diet towards less abrasive foods and possibly less tuberous plants.

Parasites appear to have been rare at Paloma, and no parasite eggs have been found. The presence of a latrine area at Paloma indicates that sanitation may have been relatively good.

== Economy ==
In general, life at Paloma was "neither easy nor desperate", and the Palomans seem to have done "fairly well for a preindustrial group". Seafood from offshore provided a rich source of protein, while plants from the lomas (as well as the nearby Chilca River valley) provided food and industrial materials. The available resources were enough to support a permanent settlement, and at least during some phases, Paloma does seem to have been occupied year-round. At other times, though, occupation was only seasonal, inhabited by nomads who moved about in a rotation of base camps.

Climate disruption from the occasional El Niño does not appear to have had a significant negative impact on residents' health - growth arrest line patterns indicate relatively short, recurring periods of stress rather than one major famine. Food storage, using salt from nearby Las Salinas as a preservative, helped offset any effects of an El Niño.

=== Subsistence activities ===
The Paloman diet was based on seafood, mainly fish and shellfish along with the occasional sea lion, and plants from the lomas. This diet was rich in protein, and assuming the marine meats were supplemented with seaweed (which was likely the case), it was probably highly nutritious. Over time, there was an increasing emphasis on harvesting marine resources, and the amount of food produced seems to have increased, since it was able to support a larger population with better health than before.

Marine vertebrates, primarily fish, make up 71% of the biomass at Paloma, while marine invertebrates make up 20%. However, this probably under-represents the overall importance of shellfish to the Paloman diet because most of them were likely eaten at the water's edge rather than people carrying heavy loads of them all the way to the village. The shellfish remains found at Paloma were probably originally brought there for short-term storage: by keeping shellfish wrapped in seaweed or stored in pits, they can be kept fresh for several days.

Large fish found at Paloma include the cabrilla (Paralabrax), Haemulon, Paralonchurus, and Sciaena deliciosa. Small fish included anchovies and herring. Many of these fish are deep-water species, so the Palomans must have had good seafaring abilities. However, no boats have been found at Paloma or for preceramic Peruvian sites in general; they were probably left by the water's edge instead of being hauled to the site.

Food processing for fish was minimal. For small fish, removing the head is just about all that's needed to prepare them for storage. Salt was definitely used as a preservative. The nearby mines at Las Salinas, between Chilca and the Mala River valley, probably supplied the salt. Fish paste, a common South American food, is highly nutritious and would have kept well in storage pits, but archaeologists have had trouble conclusively identifying it at Paloma. Such a nutritious food was probably too valuable for the ancient residents to let it go to waste. The importance of ground-up fish meal at Paloma is disputed - Robert Benfer claimed it was "labor intensive with little reward" and says that previous scholars overstated its importance. Benfer wrote that some fish meal had been found at the site, but not much; Jeffrey Quilter, meanwhile, wrote that much of the purported fish meal was in fact fossilized poo.

Shellfish found at Paloma include several species of mussels (Perumytilus purpuratus, Semimytilus algosus, Choromytilus chorus) and clams (Protothaca thaca, Mesodesma donacium). The first clams appear at Level 300, while mussels also increase in prominence at that point. Mussels are commonly found on rockier shores, while clams are mostly found on sandy beaches. As a result, it seems that the Palomans expanded their range of exploitation over time - the closest shores to the site are rocky shores ideal for gathering mussels, while sandy beaches for gathering clams are farther afield - the nearest large areas for clam gathering are 6 km northwest, at San Bartolo, or near the mouth of the Chilca River to the south.

Cultivated gourds, the earliest known domesticated plant in South America, are relatively common at Paloma. Here, they were probably used less as a dietary staple and more for non-food uses like floats and containers. Some gourd fragments were found with holes near the rims and thin cords going through them, which may have been to hang them on strings. One gourd fragment with lots of holes in it may have been used as a sieve or colander.

One lomas plant, a begonia called Begonia geraniifolia, may have been under the process of domestication at Paloma. This plant has large edible tubers, similar to potatoes, which in some areas were the most common plant remains found at the site. It may not have been fully domesticated, but it was probably at least managed or encouraged. There is "no modern, historical, or ethnographic evidence for the use of this plant".

The fruits of the mito (Carica candicans), the algarrobo (Prosopis), and the cactus Loxanthocereus were also consumed.

=== Trade ===
Some items found at Paloma are not found locally, suggesting that the people who lived here traded with other groups who lived farther away. The nearest source of obsidian, for example, is at Huancavelica, in the southern mountains 400 km away. A worked femur of a spider monkey is also unlikely to have been local - the spider monkey doesn't live in the lomas; its closest habitats are the ceja de la selva in the Andes or the moister slopes further north near the present-day border with Ecuador. A bright red Spondylus shell was also found at Paloma; this species is "not usually found south of the warm waters of the Gulf of Guayaquil and it is almost certain that this has always been their southern limit." Trade with these distant areas was likely done indirectly, through "down-the-line" exchanges, rather than direct contact with those groups.

== Archaeobotany ==
Since the time when Paloma was a village, the ecosystem of the surrounding lomas has changed considerably. In ancient times, there may have been an abundance of plant species that are now extinct or rare. For example, the most common type of pollen found at archaeological sites in the area is not identifiable with any present-day species. (It may belong to the genus Heliotropium, but this is uncertain.) Meanwhile, many of the plant species now present in the area were only introduced after the Spanish conquest.

The lomas surrounding ancient Paloma had a richer plant life than the present day. Trees were much more abundant then, which helped retain moisture from winter fogs and in turn promoted growth of other plants. Among the more common trees were willow (Salix), chaydo (Capparis prisca), and Caesalpinia of various species. Several leafy shrubs, like Piqueria, Croton alnifolius, and Heliotropium, also contributed to the canopy's moisture retention.

Over time, human activity caused this delicate landscape to degrade. Cutting down trees for use as firewood reduced the lomas overstory and caused ground moisture to evaporate more quickly, which ultimately led to a decline of plant life in terms of both density and species diversity. Later strata at Paloma show fewer woody plant remains that were burned, and preserved firewood is generally smaller in diameter than in earlier levels. This environmental degradation may have contributed to Paloma's eventual abandonment.

== History of study ==
Engel conducted excavations in 1973, digging two trenches in a cross shape in Unit 1. In 1975, additional excavations were proposed as a joint project between the University of Missouri and the National Agrarian University of Peru's Center for the Study of Arid Zones. There were two 5-month field seasons in 1976 and 1979, followed by a more constrained excavations in 1982 which also involved rechecking the site's stratigraphy. These involved expanding the excavated area beyond the initial two trenches.
