= Department of Lima =

Department of Peru

Lima Nimaja (Jaqaru)
- Department
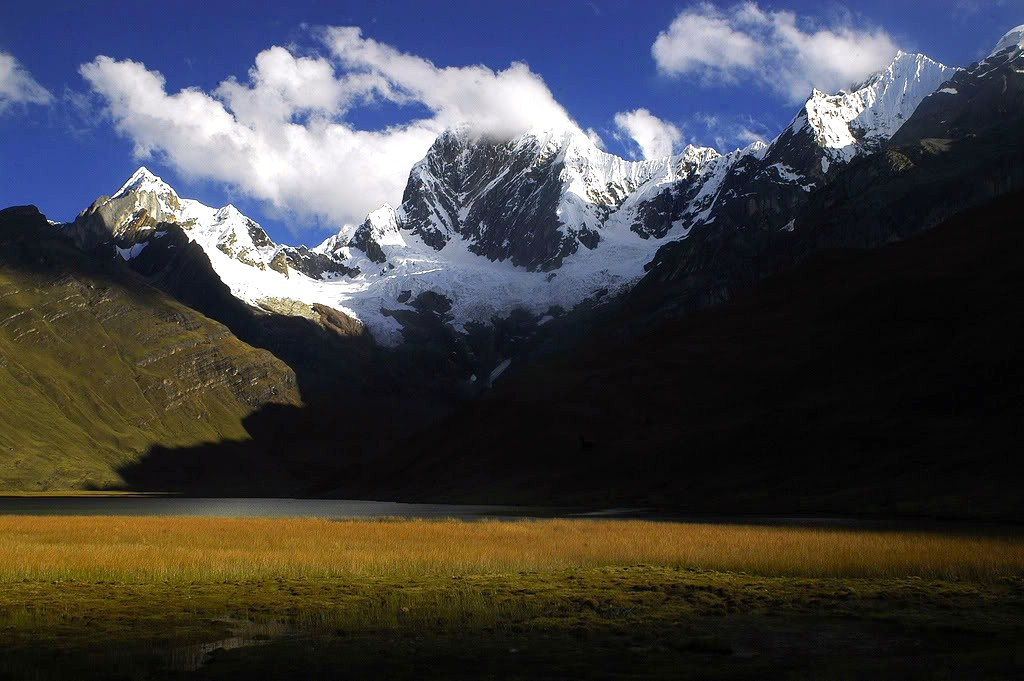
- Jirishanca and Rondoy mountains

- Flag Coat of arms

- Location of Lima within Peru
- Coordinates: 11.85°S 76.45°W
- Country: Peru
- Established: August 4, 1821
- Capital: Lima (Note: The department operates under two different jurisdictions: The Metropolitan Municipality of Lima administers Lima, a province under an autonomous special regime, and the remaining provinces are administered by the Regional Government of Lima, based in Huacho.)
- Provinces: List: Barranca; Cajatambo; Cañete; Canta; Huaral; Huarochirí; Huaura; Lima; Oyón; Yauyos

Government
  - Type: Regional Government
  - Governor: Rosa Vásquez Cuadrado

Area (Note: Excluding Lima province.)
  - Total: 32,129.31 km^{2} (12,405.20 sq mi)
- Highest elevation: 5,654 m (18,550 ft)
- Lowest elevation: 0 m (0 ft)

Population (2025 census)
  - Total: 1,018,876
  - Density: 31.71173/km^{2} (82.13300/sq mi)
- Demonym: limeño/a
- UBIGEO: 15
- Dialing code: 01
- ISO 3166 code: PE-LIM
- Website: www.gob.pe/regionlima/

Lima (Spanish pronunciation: [ˈlima]; Jaqaru: Nimaja, [niˈmaxa]) is a department of Peru. Located in the country's central coast, it is administered by a regional government based in Huacho, whose jurisdiction does not include the quasi-autonomous special regime of the province of Lima, coterminous with the country's capital, Lima.

== Etymology ==
The name comes from one of two sources: Either the Aymara language lima-limaq (meaning "yellow flower"), or the Spanish pronunciation of the Quechua word rimaq (meaning "talker", and actually written and pronounced limaq in the nearby Quechua I languages). It is worth nothing that the same Quechua word is also the source of the name given to the river that feeds the city, the Rímac River (pronounced as in the politically dominant Quechua II languages, with an "r" instead of an "l"). It is known in Jaqaru, a language spoken in the department's districts of Catahuasi and Tupe, as Nimaja.

It was also known simply as the Department of the Capital from 1821 until 1823.

== History ==
On the northern coast of the region, the first known civilization in the Americas, Caral, emerged around the 4th millennium BC, with some characteristics that were maintained by later cultures of Pre-Columbian Peru: the use of the quipu, regional trade, and monumental religious architecture. The Aymara and Quechua language families also originated in this region.

The remains of early Andean inhabitants, hunters and harpoon fishermen from more than 6500 years ago, are to be found in the department. Theey were found in Chivateros, near the Chillón River, and in various other places. These persons incorporated nets, hooks, farming, ceramics and weaving to their everyday objects. The inhabitants of the coast lived in the lomas and the valleys, where they built temples and dwelling complexes, leading to huge ceremonial centres, such as the Huacoy and Ancón ((where lithic prehistoric projectile points of Paijan were found) on the Chillón River; Garagay and La Florida on the Rímac River, Manchay on the Lurín River; and Chancay, Supe and many other valleys to the north and south. There are finely ornamented temples with figures modelled in clay. The 5,000-year-old ruins known as El Paraíso are also located in this area.

The Lima culture (100 to 650 AD) arose in this area, specially in the central valleys from Chancay to Lurín. It was distinguished by painted adobe buildings. During this time, the Huari conquest took place, thus giving rise to Huari-style ceramics, together with a local style known as Nievería. As the population grew, their culture changed. With the decline of the Huari, whose most important center was Cajamarquilla, new local cultures arose. The Chancay are the most well-known. They developed large urban centers and a considerable textile production, as well as mass-produced ceramics.

At this stage in the mid-15th century, the Incas arrived from their base in the Andes. They conquered and absorbed the regional cultures and occupied important sites such as Pachacamac, turning it into an administrative centre.

=== Spanish period ===
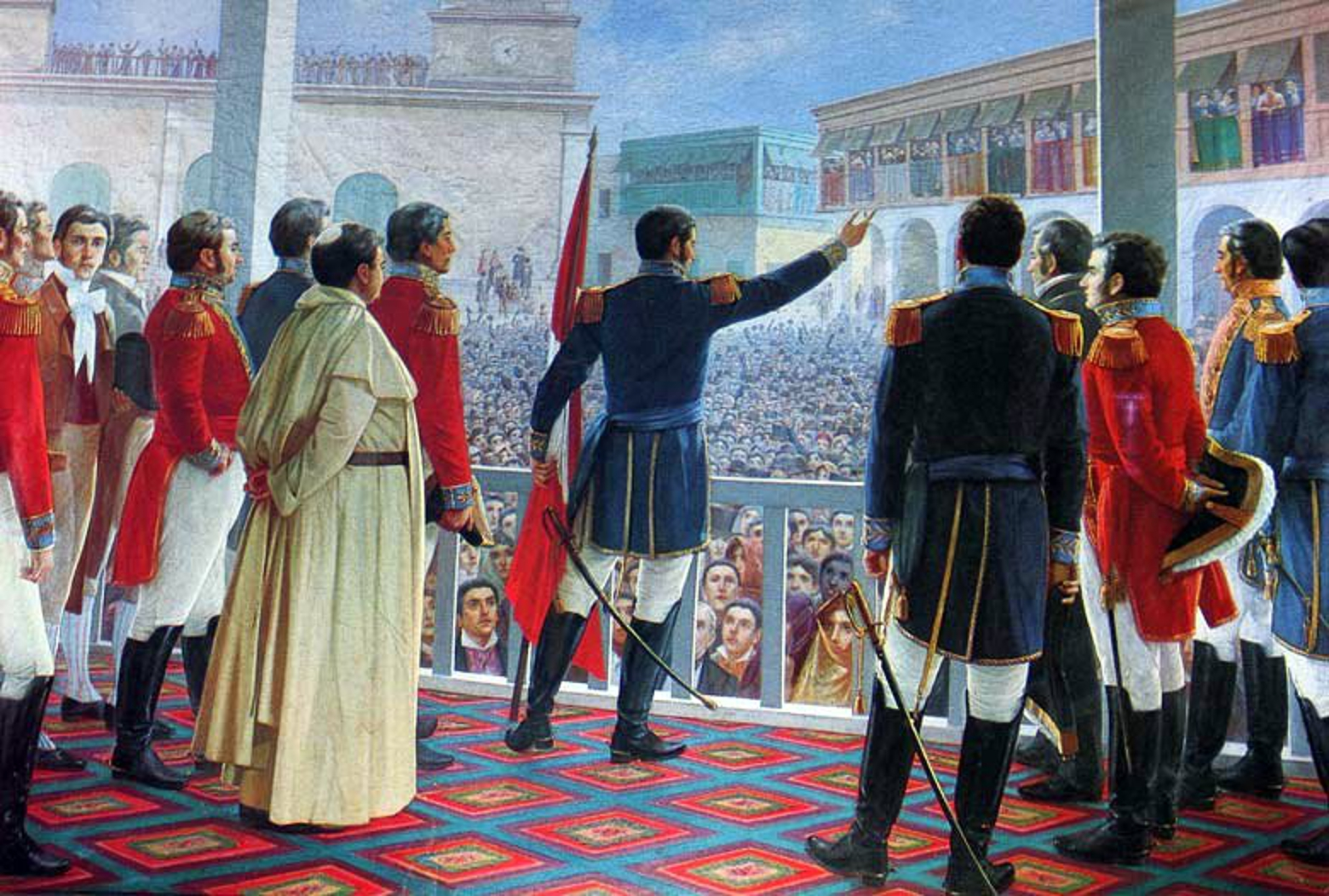
José de San Martín declares the independence of Peru (Proclamación de la Independencia del Perú)

The Spanish conquered and occupied the area in the 16th century. From 1784 to 1821, the area (today part of Lima—except Cajatambo and Oyón—and Ica, as well of the coast of Ancash) was administered as the Intendancy of Lima (the Cercado de la Capital), subdivided into partidos. During the Peruvian War of Independence, the town of Huaura served as the location for the first proclamation of the independence of Peru. José de San Martín made the announcement from a balcony on November 27, 1820.

The Department of the Coast (Spanish: Departamento de la Costa) was established on February 12, 1821, through an official document issued by San Martín that also created the departments of Huaylas, Tarma and Trujillo, each headed by a president. Their jurisdiction extended to the territory occupied by the Liberating Expedition of Peru. Its capital was Huaura, the seat of its president, whose lone officeholder was Vicente Dupuy. It was subdivided into three provinces: Santa, Chancay, and Canta. It was represented at the first Congress of Peru in 1822 by the following:

Constituent Deputy
Title	Name
Titular	Toribio Dávalos
Titular	Cayetano Requena
Titular	Toribio Rodríguez de Mendoza
Substitute	Pedro Sayán

San Martín's forces did not reach Lima—located south of the department—for five more months, where he again proclaimed the independence of Peru on July 28, 1821. This time, the announcement took place in four of the city's urban squares: La Merced, Plaza Mayor, Santa Ana and Inquisición. The announcement in the main square was made from the Casa del Oidor

=== Republican period ===
The Department of the Capital (Spanish: Departamento de la Capital) was created through the a Provisional Statute of August 4, 1821, composed of the partidos of Cercado de la Capital, Yauyos, Cañete, and Ica, also including the government of Huarochirí. On November 4, 1823, the department of the Coast was annexed into its territory. In 1835, Santa was transferred to Huaylas.

On August 11, 1836, the Republic of North Peru was created following a civil war. Nine days later, Callao was granted autonomy by Protector Andrés de Santa Cruz. On October 28, North Peru, to which the department of Lima belonged, joined the Peru–Bolivian Confederation. The War of the Confederation threatened the country's stability, with a seccessionist government headed by Luis José de Orbegoso taking control of North Peru. Orbegoso's forces were defeated in a confrontation that took place north of Lima. The Chilean–dissident Peruvian alliance eventually defeated the Confederate forces, and the state dissolved in 1839.

In 1855, the province of Ica was separated from the department. It was elevated eleven years later by Mariano Ignacio Prado. The Villa de Huacho was elevated to city level through the law of November 10, 1874, which also made it the provincial capital. The law was passed by Manuel Pardo.

In 1879, a war between a Peruvian–Bolivian alliance against Chile began, known as the War of the Pacific. The latter's military campaign was successful, and Lima was occupied by the Chilean Army following a brief land campaign that began in Pisco.

In 1916, Cajatambo province, which also included what later became Oyón province at the time, was transferred to Lima.

=== Contemporary period ===
During the Internal conflict in Peru, parts of the territory were occupied by the Shining Path. In 1985, Oyón province was created. In 1988, Chancay province was dissolved.

In 2006, a team of archeological researchers led by Robert Benfer announced their findings from a four-year excavation at Buena Vista in the Chillón River valley a few kilometres north of present-day Lima. They had discovered a 4200-year-old observatory constructed by an early Andean civilization, a three-dimensional sculpture, unique for the time period in this region, and sophisticated carvings. The observatory is on top of a 10-meter pyramidal mound and has architectural features for sighting the astronomical solstices. The discovery pushes back the time for the development of complex civilisation in the area and has altered scholars' understanding of Preceramic period cultures in Peru.

== Politics ==
The department is administered by a regional government based in Huacho. The province of Lima is administered by the Metropolitan Municipality of Lima. The former is headed by a regional governor, while the latter is headed by the metropolitan mayor.

=== List of governors ===
Since 2023, the regional governor of Lima is Rosa Vásquez Cuadrado.

=== Subdivisions ===
Map of provinces

The department is divided into ten provinces, which are composed of 171 districts.

- Barranca (Barranca)
- Cajatambo (Cajatambo)
- Cañete (San Vicente de Cañete)
- Canta (Canta)
- Huaral (Huaral)
- Huarochirí (Matucana)
- Huaura (Huacho)
- Lima (Lima)
- Oyón (Oyón)
- Yauyos (Yauyos)

== Geography ==
The department of Lima is bordered by the departments of Ancash on the north, Huánuco, Pasco, and Junín on the east, Huancavelica on the southeast, Ica on the south, and the Pacific Ocean and the Lima Province on the west.

The department has a coastal and an Andean zone, and has a great diversity of natural regions: the Coast or Chala (0 to 500 meters above sea level) up to the Janka or Mountain range (Spanish: Cordillera, over 4800 meters). The predominating regions are the Yunga (500 to 2300 meters above sea level) and Quechua (2300 to 3500 meters)

=== Climate ===
The department's climate is subtropical, desert and humid; a microclimate with temperatures that fluctuate between temperate and warm. The average temperature is 18 °C. The coast has cloudy skies from June to November, with sporadic appearances of the sun in those months, although the areas and places far from the sea in the climatic region called Yungas, above 500 metres above sea level and where Chosica, Cieneguilla, La Molina and Canto Grande are located in San Juan de Lurigancho, they have sunny afternoons and higher average temperatures (especially if we are above 1310 meters above sea level). On the coastal coast, the mass of clouds is due to the cold waters of the Humboldt Current that run through the South Pacific Ocean, which reduces the ambient temperature between 6 and 9 °C, and therefore evaporation from the sea is less. The garúa or drizzle is the typical rain of the region. The humidity level has a permanent average of 80%. The usual average annual temperature is 14°C during winter and 25.5°C during all summers.

== Economy ==
The department is the main centre of economic-financial, service and manufacturing activity in the country. In agriculture, its tangüis cotton crops, its sugar crops, fruit trees and take-out bread products stand out. In livestock farming, the raising of cattle, sheep and pigs. In poultry farming, there are countless poultry farms; In artisanal fishing, fish and mollusks are extracted for immediate human consumption. 70% of the country's industries are concentrated in the region, from those that process fish oil and meal (in Chancay, Supe and Huacho), to others that refine oil (in La Pampilla and Conchán) and zinc (in Cajamarquilla), or that are dedicated to metal-mechanics, textiles, manufacturing and food processing. In terms of energy, there are the Moyopampa, Huampani, Matucana, Huinco, Sheque and Cahua hydroelectric plants. In addition, there is the Santa Rosa thermal power plant. Because it is the first economy in the country, it is the most developed in areas that other departments do not consolidate and it is the most prone to suffer problems from abroad due to the importance of international trade for Peru, it controls the greatest development and at the moment the country can double its size in 2014.

== Demographics ==
According to the Instituto Nacional de Estadística e Informática, most of the country's inhabitants are located in the department's capital which, in 2025, was numbered at 10,432,133 people, or 30.4% of the total population.

== Transportation ==
The department is served by a railway system operated by the Ferrocarril Central Andino consortium that connects Lima with Huancayo and Cerro de Pasco. A railway that would connect the city of Lima with Ica is also planned.

Metropolitan Lima is serviced by the Metropolitano bus system, as well as a metro system it shares with Callao.

== Culture ==
=== Education ===
In 2020, Lima was the department where the monthly spending in education was the highest (S/. 108), followed by Arequipa (S/ 76.3), Callao (S/ 60.9), Junín (S/ 52.0) and Ica (S/ 46.0).

=== Landmarks ===
Points of interest in the department include Caral, Lachay National Reserve and Nor Yauyos-Cochas Landscape Reserve.

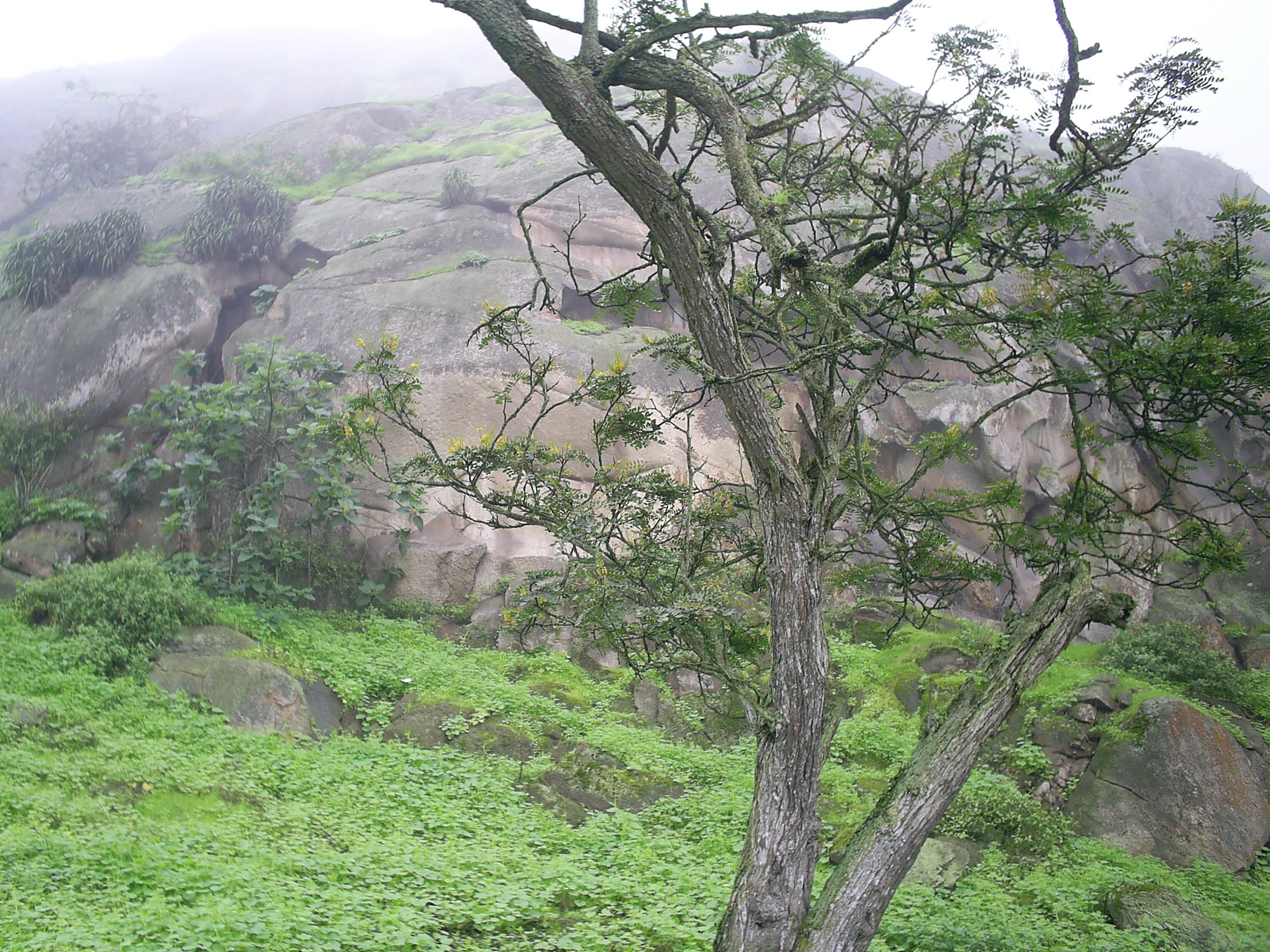
Lachay National Reserve

The Lachay National Reserve, in the Huaura province, is a unique mist-fed eco-system of wild plant and animal species, is a natural reserve located in the north of the department.

Huacho is the capital of the Lima Region and the most populous city of the department (excluding Lima which is administered by an autonomous government, the Metropolitan Municipality of Lima). Sitting at the bottom of a wide bay, it has a pleasant and dry climate. In its vicinity is the Huaura River where rice, cotton, sugar cane and different fruits and cereals are grown. This has given rise to an important cotton industry as well as soap and oil factories.

Lunahuaná District of Cañete Province, is located 38 km (24 mi) away from the south city of San Vicente de Cañete. The Incahuasi Archeological complex is located there. Lunahuaná has a dry climate and the sun shines during most of the year. Lately, Lunahuaná has become an adventure sports paradise, such as: Canotaje (Whitewater Rafting), Parapente & Ala Delta. Whitewater rafting is possible due to the Cañete River, which has rapids up to level 4. The main settlement in this district is the town of Lunahuaná.

== See also ==
- Administrative divisions of Peru
- Regions of Peru
