= 2026 Tradición Copera =

Tradición Copera
- Season: 2027
- Dates: 31 October 2026 – 28 February 2027

The 2026 Tradición Copera (officially known as the 2026 Campeonato Nacional Tradición Copera 2026) is the inaugural edition of the tournament organized by the Liga Nacional de Fútbol Aficionado (LINFA), the governing body of the Federación Peruana de Futbol.

The competition brings together 24 clubs from different regions of Peru, selected to participate in the 2026 Tradición Copera.

The tournament will be played from 24 October 2026 to 28 February 2027. The champions will earn promotion to Liga 3, while the runners-up will enter the 2027 Departmental Stage of the Copa Perú corresponding to the Liga Departamental from which they originate.

== Teams ==
On October 4, 2026, Real Huarcos announced its institutional merger with Club Deportivo Inmaculada, forming an alliance that would compete in the tournament under the name Inmaculada Huarcos.

On October 27, 2026, Octavio Espinosa announced that it would not participate in the tournament due to financial difficulties, stating that no agreement had been reached with some of the individuals and companies that had planned to invest in the club.

=== Stadia and locations ===
Locations of the 2026 Tradición Copera teams

Team	City	Stadium
Alfredo Salinas	Yauri	Municipal de Espinar
Atlético Huracán	Moquegua	25 de Noviembre
Bagua FC	Bagua	Manuel Antonio Mesones Muro
Barranco City	Barranco	Julio Lores Colán
Chosica FC	Chosica	Solís García
Colegio Comercio 64	Pucallpa	Aliardo Soria Pérez
Coronel Bolognesi	Tacna	Jorge Basadre
Deportivo Municipal	Lima	Municipal de Chorrillos
Deportivo Municipal (Chacos)	Ambo	Municipal de Ambo
Diablos Rojos	Huancavelica	IPD de Huancavelica
Dos de Mayo	Cajabamba	Municipal Germán Contreras Jara
Inmaculada Huarcos	San Vicente de Cañete	Roberto Yáñez
José Gálvez	Chimbote	Manuel Rivera Sánchez
León de Huánuco	Huánuco	Heraclio Tapia
Maristas	Huacho	Segundo Aranda Torres
Miguel Grau	Abancay	El Olivo
Octavio Espinosa	Ica, Peru	
Regatas Lima	Lima	Hugo Sotil
San Martín Occidente	Paita	Hermanos Carcamo
Social Venus	Huacho	Segundo Aranda Torres
Sport Áncash	Huaraz	Rosas Pampa
Sportivo Huracán	Arequipa	La Tomilla
UNISPA	Yauri	Municipal de Espinar
Universidad San Marcos	Lima	

== Torneo Regional ==
=== Group 1 ===
Pos	Team	Pld	W	D	L	GF	GA	GD	Pts	Qualification	SMO	BAG	DDM	LEO	RHU	CHO
1	San Martín Occidente	4	2	2	0	7	5	+2	8	Advance to Quarterfinals		–	0–0	–	1–0	–
2	Bagua FC	4	2	1	1	9	7	+2	7	Advance to Quarterfinals	–		3–2	–	–	2–0
3	Dos de Mayo (Cajabamba)	4	2	1	1	4	3	+1	7		–	–		–	1–0	1–0
4	León de Huánuco	4	1	2	1	9	9	0	5		1–2	3–2	–		2–2	–
5	Inmaculada Huarcos	4	0	2	2	4	6	−2	2		–	2–2	–	–		–
6	Chosica FC	4	0	2	2	7	10	−3	2		4–4	–	–	3–3	–	

Updated to match(es) played on 22 november 2026. Source: LINFA
Legend: Blue = home team win; Yellow = draw; Red = away team win.

=== Group 2 ===
Pos	Team	Pld	W	D	L	GF	GA	GD	Pts	Qualification	ANC	MAR	VEN	USM	DIA	OCT
1	Sport Áncash	4	4	0	0	15	3	+12	12	Advance to Quarterfinals		4–1	–	3–0	5–1	–
2	Maristas	4	3	0	1	8	4	+4	9	Advance to Quarterfinals	–		–	3–0	–	–
3	Social Venus	3	2	0	1	7	3	+4	6		1–3	–		–	3–0	–
4	Universidad San Marcos	3	1	0	2	3	6	−3	3		–	–	–		–	3–0
5	Diablos Rojos (H)	4	1	0	3	4	9	−5	3		–	0–1	–	–		3–0
6	Octavio Espinosa (R)	4	0	0	4	0	12	−12	0	Retired from the competition	–	0–3	0–3	–	–	

Updated to match(es) played on 22 november 2026. Source: LINFA
Legend: Blue = home team win; Yellow = draw; Red = away team win.
(R) Relegated

=== Group 3 ===
Pos	Team	Pld	W	D	L	GF	GA	GD	Pts	Qualification	BOL	SHU	HUR	MIG	ALF	UNI
1	Coronel Bolognesi	4	3	0	1	9	5	+4	9	Advance to Quarterfinals		3–2	3–0	–	–	2–1
2	Sportivo Huracán	4	2	1	1	10	6	+4	7	Advance to Quarterfinals	–		–	4–1	3–1	–
3	Atlético Huracán	4	2	1	1	3	4	−1	7		–	–		1–0	–	1–1
4	Miguel Grau	4	2	0	2	5	6	−1	6		–	–	–		3–1	1–0
5	Alfredo Salinas	4	1	0	3	4	8	−4	3		2–1	–	0–1	–		–
6	UNISPA	4	0	2	2	3	5	−2	2		–	1–1	–	–	–	

Updated to match(es) played on 22 november 2026. Source: LINFA
Legend: Blue = home team win; Yellow = draw; Red = away team win.

=== Group 4 ===
Pos	Team	Pld	W	D	L	GF	GA	GD	Pts	Qualification	MCH	MUN	BAR	GAL	COM	REG
1	Deportivo Municipal (Chacos)	4	4	0	0	9	2	+7	12	Advance to Quarterfinals		1–0	–	4–1	3–1	–
2	Deportivo Municipal	3	2	0	1	4	2	+2	6	Advance to Quarterfinals	–		–	3–1	–	–
3	Barranco City	4	2	0	2	8	6	+2	6		0–1	–		–	5–2	–
4	José Gálvez	4	2	0	2	8	10	−2	6		–	–	3–2		–	3–1
5	Colegio Comercio 64	3	1	0	2	6	9	−3	3		–	–	–	–		3–1
6	Regatas Lima	4	0	0	4	2	8	−6	0		–	0–1	0–1	–	–	

Updated to match(es) played on 22 November 2026. Source: LINFA
Legend: Blue = home team win; Yellow = draw; Red = away team win.

== See also ==
- 2026 Liga 1
- 2026 Liga 2
- 2026 Liga 3
- 2026 Copa Perú
- 2026 Ligas Departamentales del Perú
- 2026 Liga Femenina
- 2026 Liga Nacional Juvenil FPF
