= 2026 Copa Perú =

Copa Perú
- Season: 2026

The 2026 Peru Cup season (Spanish: Copa Perú 2026), the largest amateur tournament of Peruvian football. The District Stage (Spanish: Ligas Distritales) started in February - March, and the National Stage (Spanish: Etapa Nacional) started in September.

== Team changes ==
Promoted to 2026 Liga 2	Promoted to 2026 Liga 3	Relegated from 2025 Liga 3
▲ Unión Minas (1st)	▲ANBA Perú (2nd) ▲ Juventud Huracán (3rd) ▲ASA (4th) ▲AD Tahuishco (7th)	▼ Sport Bolognesi (9th, Retired) ▼ Deportivo Municipal (Retired) ▼ Rauker (9th, Retired) ▼ Diablos Rojos (9th, Retired)

== Departmental stage ==
Departmental Stage: 2026 Ligas Departamentales del Perú

The following list shows the teams that qualified for the National Stage.

Department	Team	Location
Amazonas	Cultural Sachapuyos	Chachapoyas
Amazonas	Juan Pablo II Amazonas	Chachapoyas
Ancash	Alianza Arenal	Moro
Ancash	Sport Áncash	Huaraz
Apurímac	Unión Minas de Pamputa	Coyllurqui
Apurímac	Miguel Grau	Abancay
Arequipa	Viargoca	Atico
Arequipa	Virgen de las Nieves	Yanaquihua
Ayacucho	Por la Santa	Andrés Avelino Cáceres
Ayacucho	Defensor Patibamba	Patibamba
Cajamarca	ADA Cajabamba	Cajabamba
Cajamarca	El Combe	Cajabamba
Callao	Juventud Palmeiras	Mi Perú
Callao	Estrella Roja	Callao
Cusco	Vinicunca FC	Pitumarca
Cusco	Deportivo Huayruro	Livitaca
Huancavelica	Sport Machete	Lircay
Huancavelica	Heraldos Negros	Ascensión
Huánuco	Atlético EVZA	Huánuco
Huánuco	Constructores de Uchiza	Uchiza
Ica	Domingo Dianderas	Chincha Alta
Ica	Bad Boys	San Clement
Junín	CESA	San Agustín de Cajas
Junín	Atlético Chanchamayo	San Ramón
La Libertad	Sport River	Florencia de Mora
La Libertad	El Inca	Chao

Department	Team	Location
Lambayeque	Cachorro	Motupe
Lambayeque	Cruz de Chalpón	Motupe
Lima	Bella Esperanza	Cerro Azul
Lima	Arsenal Lawn Tennis	Jesús María
Loreto	Atlético Nacional	Iquitos
Loreto	UNAP	Iquitos
Madre de Dios	ADEVIL	Inambari
Madre de Dios	La Masía Nace	Huepetuhe
Moquegua	Liberty School College	Moquegua
Moquegua	Atlético Huracán	Moquegua
Pasco	Sociedad Tiro 28	Tinyahuarco
Pasco	Academia Pepe	Palcazu
Piura	Atlético Torino	Pariñas
Piura	Deportivo Caysa Yapatera	Chulucanas
Puno	Leones de Anccaca	Laraqueri
Puno	CEFUT Juliaca	Juliaca
San Martín	Shanao FC	Shanao
San Martín	Sport Huaja	San José de Sisa
Tacna	Virgen de la Natividad	Tacna
Tacna	Vendaval Azul	Alto de la Alianza
Tumbes	Deportivo Pacífico	Zarumilla
Tumbes	UD Chulucanas	Aguas Verdes
Ucayali	Deportivo Bancos	Pucallpa
Ucayali	Deportivo Municipal (Atalaya)	Atalaya

== National Stage ==
This phase features the 50 teams that qualified from the Departmental Stage. Each team plays 3 games at home and 3 games away, for a total of 6 games against 3 different geographical rivals. The departmental stage winners only play against departmental runners-up, and vice versa. All the teams are positioned in one general table. After 6 matches, the team in places 1 to 32 are qualified directly to the Round of 32. The teams in places 33 to 50 are eliminated.

=== Tie-breaking criteria ===
The ranking of teams in the Unique Table is based on the following criteria:
1. Number of Points
2. Number of Relative Points, which are calculated by multiplying the points obtained against each rival with the total points obtained by this rival.
3. Goal difference
4. Number of goals scored
5. Better performance in away matches based on the following criteria:
1. Number of Away Points
2. Number of Away Relative Points
3. Goal Difference in away games
4. Number of goals scored in away games
6. Number of First-Half points: considering the half-time results as the final results
7. Drawing of lots

=== League table ===
Pos	Team	Pld	W	D	L	GF	GA	GD	Pts	Qualification
1	Unión Minas de Pamputa	6	5	1	0	17	6	+11	16	Round of 32
2	ADA Cajabamba	6	4	2	0	14	6	+8	14	Round of 32
3	Deportivo Bancos	6	4	2	0	14	7	+7	14	Round of 32
4	Vinicunca FC	6	4	2	0	19	7	+12	14	Round of 32
5	Sociedad Tiro 28	6	4	1	1	10	4	+6	13	Round of 32
6	Leones de Anccaca	6	4	1	1	17	8	+9	13	Round of 32
7	Bella Esperanza	6	4	1	1	13	4	+9	13	Round of 32
8	Atlético Nacional	6	4	0	2	11	6	+5	12	Round of 32
9	Juventud Palmeiras	6	4	0	2	10	9	+1	12	Round of 32
10	Domingo Dianderas	6	4	0	2	10	4	+6	12	Round of 32
11	ADEVIL	6	4	0	2	10	11	−1	12	Round of 32
12	El Inca	6	3	2	1	14	9	+5	11	Round of 32
13	Cachorro	6	3	2	1	14	11	+3	11	Round of 32
14	Viargoca	6	3	2	1	11	6	+5	11	Round of 32
15	Virgen de la Natividad	6	3	2	1	10	8	+2	11	Round of 32
16	CESA	6	3	2	1	12	5	+7	11	Round of 32
17	Bad Boys	6	3	1	2	10	9	+1	10	Round of 32
18	Cruz de Chalpón	6	3	1	2	11	9	+2	10	Round of 32
19	Sport Áncash	6	3	1	2	5	6	−1	10	Round of 32
20	Sport Machete	6	3	1	2	17	10	+7	10	Round of 32
21	Atlético EVZA	6	3	1	2	6	3	+3	10	Round of 32
22	Sport Huaja	6	3	1	2	10	6	+4	10	Round of 32
23	Atlético Torino	6	3	1	2	13	9	+4	10	Round of 32
24	Arsenal Lawn Tennis	6	3	0	3	10	13	−3	9	Round of 32
25	CEFUT Juliaca	6	2	2	2	9	7	+2	8	Round of 32
26	El Combe	6	2	2	2	16	9	+7	8	Round of 32
27	Shanao	6	2	2	2	7	9	−2	8	Round of 32
28	Por La Santa	6	2	2	2	10	10	0	8	Round of 32
29	Virgen de las Nieves	6	2	1	3	8	6	+2	7	Round of 32
30	Heraldos Negros	6	2	1	3	7	13	−6	7	Round of 32
31	Alianza Arenal	6	2	1	3	11	9	+2	7	Round of 32
32	Defensor Patibamba	6	2	1	3	5	10	−5	7	Round of 32
33	Sport River	6	2	1	3	10	10	0	7	Ligas Distritales
34	UD Chulucanas	6	2	1	3	11	10	+1	7	Ligas Distritales
35	Vendaval Azul	6	2	1	3	10	15	−5	7	Ligas Distritales
36	Deportivo Pacífico	6	2	1	3	12	15	−3	7	Ligas Distritales
37	Atlético Chanchamayo	6	1	3	2	8	11	−3	6	Ligas Distritales
38	Atlético Huracán	6	1	3	2	7	9	−2	6	Ligas Distritales
39	Deportivo Huayruro	6	1	2	3	15	15	0	5	Ligas Distritales
40	Deportivo Municipal (Atalaya)	6	1	2	3	6	10	−4	5	Ligas Distritales
41	Deportivo Caysa Yapatera	6	1	2	3	12	14	−2	5	Ligas Distritales
42	Liberty School College	6	1	2	3	8	9	−1	5	Ligas Distritales
43	Academia Pepe	6	1	1	4	3	15	−12	4	Ligas Distritales
44	Constructores de Uchiza	6	1	1	4	3	10	−7	4	Ligas Distritales
45	UNAP	6	1	0	5	8	13	−5	3	Ligas Distritales
46	Juan Pablo II Amazonas	6	0	3	3	8	20	−12	3	Ligas Distritales
47	Cultural Sachapuyos	6	0	3	3	6	21	−15	3	Ligas Distritales
48	Miguel Grau	6	0	1	5	6	13	−7	1	Ligas Distritales
49	Estrella Roja	6	0	0	6	3	13	−10	0	Ligas Distritales
50	La Masía Nace	6	0	0	6	2	27	−25	0	Ligas Distritales

Updated to match(es) played on September 2026. Source:
Rules for classification: 1) points; 2) goal difference; 3) number of goals scored; 4) head-to-head record; 5) drawing of lots

=== Results ===
==== Round 1 ====
Team 1	Score	Team 2
Deportivo Pacífico	2–3	Cruz de Chalpón
Atlético Torino	1–0	UD Chulucanas
Cachorro	3–2	Deportivo Caysa Yapatera
Cultural Sachapuyos	1–1	El Combe
ADA Cajabamba	4–2	Juan Pablo II Amazonas
Sport River	3–0	Sport Áncash
Shanao	1–1	El Inca
Atlético Nacional	4–1	Sport Huaja
Deportivo Bancos	2–1	UNAP
Atlético EVZA	2–0	Deportivo Municipal (Atalaya)
Sociedad Tiro 28	2–1	Constructores de Uchiza
Alianza Arenal	4–0	Arsenal Lawn Tennis
Bella Esperanza	3–0	Estrella Roja
Juventud Palmeiras	2–1	Bad Boys
Domingo Dianderas	4–0	Heraldos Negros
Sport Machete	4–1	Atlético Chanchamayo
CESA	5–0	Academia Pepe
Por La Santa	1–1	Miguel Grau
Unión Minas de Pamputa	3–0	Defensor Patibamba
Vinicunca FC	7–0	La Masía Nace
ADEVIL	2–0	Deportivo Huayruro
Leones de Anccaca	2–0	Virgen de las Nieves
Liberty School College	0–0	CEFUT Juliaca
Viargoca	4–2	Vendaval Azul
Virgen de la Natividad	1–0	Atlético Huracán

==== Round 2 ====
Team 1	Score	Team 2
Atlético Huracán	1–1	Viargoca
Heraldos Negros	2–1	CESA
Cruz de Chalpón	1–1	ADA Cajabamba
Sport Áncash	1–0	Atlético EVZA
Sport Huaja	4–0	Cultural Sachapuyos
Virgen de las Nieves	2–0	Virgen de la Natividad
Deportivo Municipal (Atalaya)	1–0	Atlético Nacional
Defensor Patibamba	2–1	Sport Machete
La Masía Nace	0–4	Leones de Anccaca
UNAP	2–3	Shanao
Constructores de Uchiza	1–1	Deportivo Bancos
Academia Pepe	0–0	Bella Esperanza
Estrella Roja	0–1	Domingo Dianderas
Deportivo Huayruro	2–3	Unión Minas de Pamputa
CEFUT Juliaca	2–0	ADEVIL
Vendaval Azul	2–0	Liberty School College
Atlético Chanchamayo	0–0	Sociedad Tiro 28
Miguel Grau	0–1	Vinicunca FC
Deportivo Caysa Yapatera	4–4	Deportivo Pacífico
UD Chulucanas	3–3	Cachorro
Juan Pablo II Amazonas	2–2	Atlético Torino
El Combe	1–0	Sport River
El Inca	1–1	Alianza Arenal
Arsenal Lawn Tennis	5–2	Juventud Palmeiras
Bad Boys	3–2	Por La Santa

==== Round 3 ====
Team 1	Score	Team 2
Viargoca	2–0	Virgen de las Nieves
Liberty School College	0–1	Atlético Huracán
Sport River	3–4	El Inca
Atlético Torino	2–0	Deportivo Caysa Yapatera
Unión Minas de Pamputa	2–1	Miguel Grau
ADEVIL	4–0	La Masía Nace
Atlético Nacional	2–0	UNAP
Deportivo Bancos	5–3	Deportivo Municipal (Atalaya)
Bella Esperanza	4–0	Arsenal Lawn Tennis
Sociedad Tiro 28	3–0	Academia Pepe
Por la Santa	0–1	Defensor Patibamba
Vinicunca FC	2–2	Deportivo Huayruro
Leones de Anccaca	2–1	CEFUT Juliaca
Virgen de la Natividad	2–2	Vendaval Azul
CESA	2–2	Atlético Chanchamayo
Deportivo Pacífico	1–3	UD Chulucanas
Cachorro	3–0	Cruz de Chalpón
Cultural Sachapuyos	3–3	Juan Pablo II Amazonas
ADA Cajabamba	1–1	El Combe
Shanao	0–0	Sport Huaja
Alianza Arenal	1–2	Sport Áncash
Sport Machete	1–1	Heraldos Negros
Juventud Palmeiras	2–0	Estrella Roja
Atlético EVZA	2–0	Constructores de Uchiza
Domingo Dianderas	2–1	Bad Boys

==== Round 4 ====
Team 1	Score	Team 2
Constructores de Uchiza	1–0	Atlético EVZA
Virgen de las Nieves	1–1	Viargoca
Miguel Grau	1–3	Unión Minas de Pamputa
La Masía Nace	1–2	ADEVIL
UNAP	3–2	Atlético Nacional
Deportivo Municipal (Atalaya)	1–1	Deportivo Bancos
Arsenal Lawn Tennis	2–0	Bella Esperanza
Estrella Roja	1–2	Juventud Palmeiras
Academia Pepe	3–2	Sociedad Tiro 28
Defensor Patibamba	1–2	Por la Santa
CEFUT Juliaca	2–2	Leones de Anccaca
Atlético Huracán	2–2	Liberty School College
Deportivo Caysa Yapatera	4–1	Atlético Torino
UD Chulucanas	1–2	Deportivo Pacífico
El Combe	2–3	ADA Cajabamba
El Inca	3–1	Sport River
Heraldos Negros	2–5	Sport Machete
Atlético Chanchamayo	1–1	CESA
Vendaval Azul	1–3	Virgen de la Natividad
Sport Huaja	1–0	Shanao
Cruz de Chalpón	3–1	Cachorro
Sport Áncash	2–1	Alianza Arenal
Bad Boys	1–0	Domingo Dianderas
Deportivo Huayruro	3–3	Vinicunca FC
Juan Pablo II Amazonas	1–1	Cultural Sachapuyos

==== Round 5 ====
Team 1	Score	Team 2
Viargoca	2–0	Atlético Huracán
CESA	1–0	Heraldos Negros
ADA Cajabamba	1–0	Cruz de Chalpón
Atlético EVZA	1–0	Sport Áncash
Cultural Sachapuyos	0–3	Sport Huaja
Virgen de la Natividad	1–0	Virgen de las Nieves
Atlético Nacional	1–0	Deportivo Municipal (Atalaya)
Sport Machete	3–0	Defensor Patibamba
Leones de Anccaca	7–0	La Masía Nace
Shanao	2–1	UNAP
Deportivo Bancos	3–0	Constructores de Uchiza
Bella Esperanza	3–0	Academia Pepe
Domingo Dianderas	2–0	Estrella Roja
Unión Minas de Pamputa	5–1	Deportivo Huayruro
ADEVIL	2–1	CEFUT Juliaca
Liberty School College	5–1	Vendaval Azul
Sociedad Tiro 28	1–0	Atlético Chanchamayo
Vinicunca FC	3–1	Miguel Grau
Deportivo Pacífico	2–0	Deportivo Caysa Yapatera
Cachorro	2–1	UD Chulucanas
Atlético Torino	6–0	Juan Pablo II Amazonas
Sport River	3–2	El Combe
Alianza Arenal	2–1	El Inca
Juventud Palmeiras	1–0	Arsenal Lawn Tennis
Por La Santa	2–2	Bad Boys

==== Round 6 ====
Team 1	Score	Team 2
Cruz de Chalpón	4–1	Deportivo Pacífico
UD Chulucanas	3–1	Atlético Torino
Deportivo Caysa Yapatera	2–2	Cachorro
El Combe	9–1	Cultural Sachapuyos
Juan Pablo II Amazonas	0–4	ADA Cajabamba
Sport Áncash	0–0	Sport River
El Inca	4–1	Shanao
Sport Huaja	1–2	Atlético Nacional
UNAP	1–2	Deportivo Bancos
Deportivo Municipal (Atalaya)	1–1	Atlético EVZA
Constructores de Uchiza	0–2	Sociedad Tiro 28
Arsenal Lawn Tennis	3–2	Alianza Arenal
Estrella Roja	2–3	Bella Esperanza
Bad Boys	2–1	Juventud Palmeiras
Heraldos Negros	2–1	Domingo Dianderas
Atlético Chanchamayo	4–3	Sport Machete
Academia Pepe	0–2	CESA
Miguel Grau	2–3	Por La Santa
Defensor Patibamba	1–1	Unión Minas de Pamputa
La Masía Nace	1–3	Vinicunca FC
Deportivo Huayruro	7–0	ADEVIL
Virgen de las Nieves	5–0	Leones de Anccaca
CEFUT Juliaca	3–1	Liberty School College
Vendaval Azul	2–1	Viargoca
Atlético Huracán	3–3	Virgen de la Natividad

== Final Rounds ==
Round of 32				Round of 16				Quarterfinals		Semifinals	Champion & Runner-Up
Unión Minas de Pamputa	2	0	2 (5)
Defensor Patibamba	2	0	2 (4)	Unión Minas de Pamputa	1	3	4
CESA	1	4	5	CESA	1	0	1
Bad Boys	0	0	0					Unión Minas de Pamputa	2
Atlético Nacional	0	4	4					Atlético Nacional	0
CEFUT Juliaca	5	0	5	Atlético Nacional	2	2	4
Juventud Palmeiras	2	1	3 (3)	Juventud Palmeiras	2	1	3
Arsenal Lawn Tennis	2	1	3							Unión Minas de Pamputa
ADA Cajabamba	1	2	3							ADA Cajabamba
Alianza Arenal	1	0	1	ADA Cajabamba	0	4	4
Virgen de la Natividad	0	1	1	Cruz de Chalpón	0	1	1
Cruz de Chalpón	4	5	9					ADA Cajabamba	0 (4)
Bella Esperanza	0	6	6					Bella Esperanza	0 (3)
El Combe	2	2	4	Bella Esperanza	1	2	3
Domingo Dianderas	1	3	4	Domingo Dianderas	1	0	1
Atlético Torino	1	1	2
Deportivo Bancos	0	6	6
Heraldos Negros	3	1	4	Deportivo Bancos	1	2	3
Viargoca	1	2	3 (4)	Viargoca	4	0	4
Sport Áncash	2	1	3 (1)					Viargoca	2
Leones de Anccaca	0	3	3					Leones de Anccaca	0
Shanao	2	0	2	Leones de Anccaca	0	4	4
ADEVIL	0	2	2	Sport Huaja	2	1	3
Sport Huaja	5	5	10							Viargoca
Vinicunca	1	2	3							Sociedad Tiro 28
Virgen de las Nieves	1	1	2	Vinicunca	1	0	1
Cachorro	2	2	4	Sport Machete	6	2	8
Sport Machete	5	2	7					Sport Machete	1
Sociedad Tiro 28	0	1	1 (5)					Sociedad Tiro 28	2
Por La Santa	0	1	1 (3)	Sociedad Tiro 28	3	1	4
El Inca	3	2	5	El Inca	1	0	1
Atlético EVZA	2	1	3

=== Round of 32 ===
Team 1	Agg.	Team 2	1st leg	2nd leg
Heraldos Negros	4–6	Deportivo Bancos	3–0	1–6
Defensor Patibamba	2–2 (4–5 p)	Unión Minas de Pamputa	2–2	0–0
Virgen de las Nieves	2–3	Vinicunca	1–1	1–2
Sport Machete	7–4	Cachorro	5–2	2–2
Atlético EVZA	3–5	El Inca	2–3	1–2
Shanao	2–3	Leones de Anccaca	2–0	0–3
Atlético Torino	2–4	Domingo Dianderas	1–1	1–3
El Combe	4–6	Bella Esperanza	2–0	2–6
Cruz de Chalpón	9–1	Virgen de la Natividad	4–0	5–1
Por La Santa	1–1 (3–5 p)	Sociedad Tiro 28	0–0	1–1
CEFUT Juliaca	5–4	Atlético Nacional	5–0	0–4
Alianza Arenal	1–3	ADA Cajabamba	1–1	0–2
Sport Huaja	10–2	ADEVIL	5–0	5–2
Arsenal Lawn Tennis	3–3 (2–3 p)	Juventud Palmeiras	2–2	1–1
Bad Boys	0–5	CESA	0–1	0–4
Sport Áncash	3–3 (1–4 p)	Viargoca	2–1	1–2

=== Round of 16 ===
Team 1	Agg.	Team 2	1st leg	2nd leg
CESA	1–4	Unión Minas de Pamputa	1–1	0–3
Juventud Palmeiras	3–4	Atlético Nacional	2–2	1–2
Cruz de Chalpón	1–4	ADA Cajabamba	0–0	1–4
Domingo Dianderas	1–3	Bella Esperanza	1–1	0–2
Viargoca	4–3	Deportivo Bancos	4–1	0–2
Sport Huaja	3–4	Leones de Anccaca	2–0	1–4
Sport Machete	8–1	Vinicunca	6–1	2–0
El Inca	1–4	Sociedad Tiro 28	1–3	0–1

=== Quarterfinals ===
20 November 2026	Unión Minas de Pamputa	2–0	Atlético Nacional	Hugo Sotil, Lima
12:00	José Racchumick 53'; Juan Pablo Carranza 90'			Referee: Augusto Menéndez

20 November 2026	ADA Cajabamba	0–0 (4–3 p)	Bella Esperanza	Hugo Sotil, Lima
15:00				Referee: Joel Alarcón
	Penalties
	Penalty scored Penalty missed		Penalty missed Penalty scored

22 November 2026	Viargoca	2–0	Leones de Anccaca	Hugo Sotil, Lima
12:00	Bill Pérez 41'; Fabricio Cancapa 75'			Referee: Micke Palomino

22 November 2026	Sport Machete	1–2	Sociedad Tiro 28	Hugo Sotil, Lima
15:00	José Hilario 75'		Remny Luque 9' 68'	Referee: Walter Guadalupe

=== Semifinals ===
November 2026	Unión Minas de Pamputa	–	ADA Cajabamba	Hugo Sotil, Lima

November 2026	Viargoca	–	Sociedad Tiro 28	Hugo Sotil, Lima

== See also ==
- 2026 Liga 1
- 2026 Liga 2
- 2026 Liga 3
- 2026 Tradición Copera
- 2026 Ligas Departamentales del Perú
