= 2004 FBC Melgar season =

FBC Melgar
2004 season
- Stadium: Estadio Melgar
- Torneo Descentralizado: Torneo Apertura: Nineth (9°); Torneo Clausura: Tenth (10°); Aggregate Table: Eighth (8°); Eighth National (8°)
Home colours	Away colours	Third colours

The 2004 FBC Melgar season were the Ninetieth (90.º) of the club from its foundation in 1915, Thirty-Five (35) participations in the top-flight of Peruvian Primera División (of 88 Editions) with denomination Torneo Descentralizado. In Previous Season the club qualified as 8th Place of the 2003 Torneo Descentralizado.

Melgar were a of fourteen (14) clubs in the Thirty-Nineth edition (39.º) Torneo Descentralizado, the competition most important of the Peruvian football. The club played the Peruvian Primera División.

== Torneo Descentralizado ==
=== Torneo Apertura ===
Pos	Team	Pld	W	D	L	GF	GA	GD	Pts
9	Coronel Bolognesi	26	9	3	14	40	44	-4	30
10	FBC Melgar	26	8	6	12	31	41	-10	30
11	Grau-Estudiantes^{1}	26	7	9	10	21	37	-16	30

== See also ==
- FBC Melgar
- 2004 Torneo Descentralizado
