= 2006 Sporting Cristal season =

Sporting Cristal
2006 season
- Stadium: San Martín de Porres, Lima
- Torneo Descentralizado: Torneo Apertura: Second (2°); Torneo Clausura: Sixth (6°); Aggregate Table: Second (2°); Third National (3°)
Home colours	Away colours	Third colours

The 2006 Sporting Cristal season were the Fifty-First (51.º) of the club from its foundation in 1955, Fifty-One (51) participations consecutives in the top-flight of Peruvian Primera División (of 90 Editions) with denomination Torneo Descentralizado. In Previous Season the club qualified as Champions National 1st Place of the 2005 Torneo Descentralizado.

Sporting Cristal were a of twelve (12) clubs in the Forty-First edition (41.º) Torneo Descentralizado, the competition most important of the Peruvian football. The club played the Peruvian Primera División and Copa Libertadores for Twenty-Sixth (26th) Time.

== Torneo Descentralizado ==
=== Torneo Apertura ===
Pos	Team	Pld	W	D	L	GF	GA	GD	Pts
1	Alianza Lima	22	13	7	2	33	13	+20	46
2	Sporting Cristal	22	13	6	3	37	17	+20	45
3	Coronel Bolognesi	22	9	7	6	32	24	+8	34

== See also ==
- Club Sporting Cristal
- 2006 Torneo Descentralizado
