= 2005 Sporting Cristal season =

Sporting Cristal
2005 season
- Stadium: San Martín de Porres, Lima
- Torneo Descentralizado: Torneo Apertura: Fourth (4°); Torneo Clausura: First (1°) Champion; Aggregate Table: Second (2°); Final National: Champion (1°); Champion National (1°)
Home colours	Away colours	Third colours

The 2005 Sporting Cristal season were the Fiftieth (50.º) of the club from its foundation in 1955, Fifty (50) participations consecutives in the top-flight of Peruvian Primera División (of 89 Editions) with denomination Torneo Descentralizado. In Previous Season the club qualified as Runner-up National 2nd Place of the 2004 Torneo Descentralizado.

Sporting Cristal were a of thirteen (13) clubs in the Fortieth edition (40.º) Torneo Descentralizado, the competition most important of the Peruvian football. The club played the Peruvian Primera División and Copa Libertadores for Twenty-Fifth (25th) Time. Sporting Cristal won their 15th Torneo Descentralizado Title.

== Torneo Descentralizado ==
=== Torneo Apertura ===
Pos	Team	Pld	W	D	L	GF	GA	GD	Pts
3	Alianza Lima	24	9	11	4	43	25	+18	38
4	Sporting Cristal	24	9	9	6	34	28	+6	36
5	Coronel Bolognesi	24	8	11	5	25	20	+5	35

== See also ==
- Club Sporting Cristal
- 2005 Torneo Descentralizado
