= Club Deportivo Coronel Bolognesi =

Peruvian football club

Coronel Bolognesi
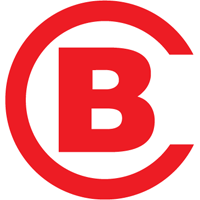
- Full name: Club Deportivo Coronel Bolognesi
- Nicknames: Bolo, Bólido del Sur, Los Diablos Rojos, Los Escarlatas, El Coronel
- Founded: 18 October 1929
- Ground: Estadio Jorge Basadre, Tacna
- Capacity: 19,000
- League: Copa Perú
- 2011: Etapa Provincial
Home colours	Away colours

Coronel Bolognesi is a Peruvian football club located in the city of Tacna. It was founded on 18 October 1929 and is named after Francisco Bolognesi.

The club is the biggest of Tacna city.

The club was founded in 1929 and play in the Peruvian Segunda División which is the second division of the Peruvian league.

== Rivalries ==
Coronel Bolognesi has had a long-standing rivalry with Mariscal Miller.

== Stadium ==
Coronel Bolognesi play their home games at the Estadio Jorge Basadre, located in the city of Tacna.

== Historic Badges ==
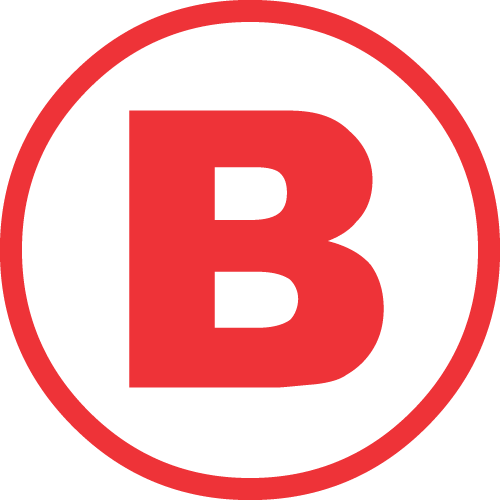

== Notable players ==
Peruvian players

- (Peru) Germán Carty
- (Peru) Juan Cominges
- (Peru) Paul Cominges
- (Peru) Johan Fano
- (Peru) Miguel Mostto
- (Peru) Diego Penny
- (Peru) Luis Ramírez
- (Peru) Junior Ross
- (Peru) Johan Vásquez
- (Peru) David Soria Yoshinari

Foreign players

- (Argentina) Federico Martorell
- (Armenia) (Argentina) José Andrés Bilibio
- (Japan) Masakatsu Sawa
- (Mexico) Miguel Ostersen

== Honours ==
=== National ===
- Torneo Clausura:

Winners (1): 2007

- Torneo Interzonal:

Winners (1): 1977
Runner-up (1): 1978

- Copa Perú:

Winners (2): 1976, 2001
Runner-up (2): 1998, 2000

=== Regional ===
- Región VIII:

Winners (4): 1998, 1999, 2000, 2001

- Liga Departamental de Tacna:

Winners (15): 1966, 1967, 1970, 1971, 1972, 1973, 1974, 1996, 1997, 1998, 1999, 2000, 2001, 2013, 2015

== Performance in CONMEBOL competitions ==
- Copa Libertadores: 1 appearance

2008: First Round

- Copa Sudamericana: 3 appearances

2004: Preliminary Round
2006: First Round
2007: First Round
