= Rubén Epitié =

Equatoguinean footballer (born 1983)

Personal information
- Full name: Rubén Epitié Dyowe Roig
- Date of birth: 19 May 1983 (age 43)
- Place of birth: Manresa, Spain
- Height: 1.84 m (6 ft 0 in)
- Position: Forward

Youth career
- 2000–2002: Manresa

Senior career*
Years	Team	Apps	(Gls)
2002–2003	Manresa	22	(1)
2003	Andorra	7	(1)
2003	La Oliva		
2004	San Marcial		
2004	Logroñés	0	(0)
2004–2005	Jerez Industrial	28	(6)
2005	Algeciras	1	(0)
2005	Algeciras B	5	(0)
2006	Mar Menor		
2006	Peralada	13	(1)
2007	Poblense		
2007–2008	Binéfar	25	(14)
2008–2010	Vilanova		
2010	Montcada	4	(2)
2010–2011	Igualada		
2011–2012	Rubí	20	(8)
2012–2013	Europa	26	(6)
2013–2014	Castelldefels	20	(5)
2021–2024	FC Pirinaica	35	(8)
Total		171	(44)

International career
2006–2007	Equatorial Guinea U23		
2009–2012	Equatorial Guinea	2	(1)
- * Club domestic league appearances and goals

Rubén Epitié Dyowe Roig (born 5 February 1983) is a former professional footballer who played as a forward. Born in Spain, he played for the Equatorial Guinea national team.

== Club career ==
Born in Manresa, Barcelona, Catalonia, Epitié spent the vast majority of his senior career in Spain, but never appeared in higher than the third division.

He represented CE Manresa, FC Andorra, CD La Oliva, ACD San Marcial, CD Logroñés, Jerez Industrial CF, Algeciras CF, AD Mar Menor-San Javier, CF Peralada, UD Poblense, CD Binéfar, CF Vilanova (sharing teams with sibling Juan in the latter), CD Montcada, CF Igualada, UE Rubí, CE Europa and UE Castelldefels.

== International career ==
As many players born in Spain, Epitié chose to represent Equatorial Guinea through ancestry – his father hailed from that country, while his mother was Spanish. He made his senior debut in 2006.

== Personal life ==
Epitié's older brother, Juan, was also a footballer – and a forward. He too spent most of his professional career in Spain, and also appeared for Equatorial Guinea internationally.
