= CF Vilanova =

Spanish association football club

Vilanova
- Full name: Club de Fútbol Vilanova
- Founded: 1951; 75 years ago
- Ground: Camp Municipal, Vilanova, Catalonia, Spain
- Capacity: 3,500
- Chairman: Ramón Centaño
- Manager: Ángel Alcolea
- League: Tercera Federación – Group 5
- 2025–26: Tercera Federación – Group 5, 4th of 18
Home colours	Away colours	Third colours

Club de Fútbol Vilanova is a Spanish football team based in Vilanova i la Geltrú, in the autonomous community of Catalonia. Founded in 1951, it plays in Tercera Federación – Group 5, holding home matches at Camp Municipal d'Esports, with a 3,500-seat capacity.

The club's first match was played on 7 October 1951.

== History ==
The club was founded in 1951, playing its first official match on 7 October 1951.

== Season to season ==
Season	Tier	Division	Place	Copa del Rey
1952–53	6	2ª Reg.	2nd	
1953–54	5	2ª Reg.	6th	
1954–55	5	2ª Reg.	6th	
1955–56	5	2ª Reg.	6th	
1956–57	5	2ª Reg.	4th	
1957–58	4	1ª Reg.	5th	
1958–59	4	1ª Reg.	7th	
1959–60	4	1ª Reg.	1st	
1960–61	3	3ª	10th	
1961–62	3	3ª	9th	
1962–63	3	3ª	11th	
1963–64	3	3ª	19th	
1964–65	4	1ª Reg.	1st	
1965–66	3	3ª	9th	
1966–67	3	3ª	14th	
1967–68	3	3ª	17th	
1968–69	3	3ª	9th	
1969–70	3	3ª	17th	First round
1970–71	4	Reg. Pref.	18th	
1971–72	5	1ª Reg.	13th	

Season	Tier	Division	Place	Copa del Rey
1972–73	5	1ª Reg.	19th	
1973–74	6	2ª Reg.	1st	
1974–75	5	1ª Reg.	15th	
1975–76	5	1ª Reg.	19th	
1976–77	6	2ª Reg.	8th	
1977–78	7	2ª Reg.	3rd	
1978–79	7	2ª Reg.	1st	
1979–80	6	1ª Reg.	12th	
1980–81	6	1ª Reg.	6th	
1981–82	6	1ª Reg.	3rd	
1982–83	6	1ª Reg.	13th	
1983–84	6	1ª Reg.	16th	
1984–85	6	1ª Reg.	10th	
1985–86	6	1ª Reg.	16th	
1986–87	7	2ª Reg.	10th	
1987–88	7	2ª Reg.	4th	
1988–89	7	2ª Reg.	2nd	
1989–90	7	2ª Reg.	1st	
1990–91	6	1ª Reg.	6th	
1991–92	7	1ª Terr.	7th	

Season	Tier	Division	Place	Copa del Rey
1992–93	7	1ª Terr.	7th	
1993–94	7	1ª Terr.	13th	
1994–95	7	1ª Terr.	17th	
1995–96	8	2ª Terr.	2nd	
1996–97	7	1ª Terr.	9th	
1997–98	7	1ª Terr.	3rd	
1998–99	7	1ª Terr.	1st	
1999–2000	6	Pref. Terr.	2nd	
2000–01	5	1ª Cat.	6th	
2001–02	5	1ª Cat.	2nd	
2002–03	4	3ª	4th	
2003–04	4	3ª	5th	
2004–05	4	3ª	14th	
2005–06	4	3ª	4th	
2006–07	4	3ª	5th	
2007–08	4	3ª	12th	
2008–09	4	3ª	7th	
2009–10	4	3ª	14th	
2010–11	4	3ª	17th	
2011–12	4	3ª	18th	

Season	Tier	Division	Place	Copa del Rey
2012–13	5	1ª Cat.	10th	
2013–14	5	1ª Cat.	9th	
2014–15	5	1ª Cat.	11th	
2015–16	5	1ª Cat.	4th	
2016–17	5	1ª Cat.	14th	
2017–18	6	2ª Cat.	1st	
2018–19	5	1ª Cat.	7th	
2019–20	5	1ª Cat.	10th	
2020–21	5	1ª Cat.	2nd	
2021–22	6	1ª Cat.	5th	
2022–23	6	1ª Cat.	9th	
2023–24	7	1ª Cat.	1st	
2024–25	6	Lliga Elit	2nd	
2025–26	5	3ª Fed.	4th	
2026–27	5	3ª Fed.		

- 19 seasons in Tercera División
- 2 seasons in Tercera Federación

== Current squad ==
Note: Flags indicate national team as defined under FIFA eligibility rules; some limited exceptions apply. Players may hold more than one non-FIFA nationality.

No.	Pos.	Nation	Player
1	GK	ESP	Mario
2	DF	ESP	Yelamos
3	DF	ESP	Sergio
4	DF	ESP	Valdu (captain)
5	DF	ESP	Baraldés
6	MF	ESP	Jarabo
7	MF	ESP	Boira
8	MF	ESP	Cano
11	FW	ESP	Triguero

No.	Pos.	Nation	Player
13	GK	ESP	Alfaro
14	MF	ESP	Edgar
15	DF	ESP	Sergi
18	MF	ESP	Morillo
19	DF	ESP	Folguera
20	MF	ESP	Pep
21	FW	ESP	Eloi
23	FW	ESP	Morillas
24	MF	HON	Erick Arias

== Former players ==
- (Armenia) (Argentina) José Andrés Bilibio
- (Equatorial Guinea) (Spain) Juan Epitié
- (Equatorial Guinea) (Spain) Rubén Epitié
