= Juan Epitié =

Equatoguinean footballer (born 1976)

Personal information
- Full name: Joan Ramón Epitié Dyowe Roig
- Date of birth: 12 October 1976 (age 50)
- Place of birth: Manresa, Spain
- Height: 1.78 m (5 ft 10 in)
- Position: Forward

Youth career
- 1987–1990: Peña Blanquiazul Manresa
- 1990–1995: Manresa

Senior career*
Years	Team	Apps	(Gls)
1995–1997	Palamós	39	(19)
1997	Castellón	12	(2)
1998	Getafe	15	(2)
1998–2000	Real Madrid B	42	(15)
2000–2002	Alavés B	29	(10)
2001–2002	→ Recreativo (loan)	29	(5)
2002–2003	Palamós	16	(4)
2003–2004	Racing Santander	0	(0)
2003	→ Bnei Yehuda (loan)	0	(0)
2003	→ Ashdod (loan)	4	(0)
2004	→ Burgos (loan)	17	(8)
2004–2005	Alavés	20	(3)
2005–2006	Castellón	16	(2)
2006	→ Shenyang Ginde (loan)	0	(0)
2007	Alavés	0	(0)
2007	→ California Victory (loan)	5	(0)
2007–2008	Lorca Deportiva	28	(4)
2009	Vilanova		
2010–2012	Gimnàstic Manresa		
Total		272	(74)

International career
2003–2008	Equatorial Guinea	12	(3)
- * Club domestic league appearances and goals

Joan Ramón 'Juan' Epitié Dyowe Roig (born 12 October 1976) is a former professional footballer who played as a forward. Born in Spain, he played for the Equatorial Guinea national team.

== Club career ==
Born in Manresa, Barcelona, Catalonia, Epitié played in Spain for the vast majority of his professional career, starting with local Palamós CF in the fourth division. He was signed by two La Liga clubs, Deportivo Alavés and Racing de Santander, but never appeared officially for either.

On loan precisely from the Cantabrians, Epitié joined Bnei Yehuda Tel Aviv F.C. in Israel in early 2004. He failed to impress, only appearing in one Toto Cup match, and ended up signing with another side in the country, F.C. Ashdod, meeting a similar fate – he was released after a couple of months.

In the 2004–05 season, Epitié returned to Alavés, now in the second level, and contributed with three goals as the Basques returned to the top flight. He was however released during the ensuing summer, moving to fellow league team CD Castellón.

Epitié re-signed with Alavés in January 2007, but was immediately loaned to California Victory. During his spell in the United States, which lasted less than one month, he played his first and last games against the same opposition, the Portland Timbers.

In the summer of 2007, Epitié returned to his country of adoption, resuming his career in the lower leagues and competing mainly in his native region.

== International career ==
As many players born in Spain, Epitié chose to represent Equatorial Guinea through ancestry. On 1 June 2008, he scored one in the nation's 2–0 home win against Sierra Leone, for the 2010 FIFA World Cup qualifiers.

== Personal life ==
Epitié's younger brother, Rubén, was also a footballer, in the same position. He spent the vast majority of his career in Spain's amateur leagues, and also appeared for Equatorial Guinea internationally.
