= Gerardo Baigorria =

Peruvian footballer (born 1951)

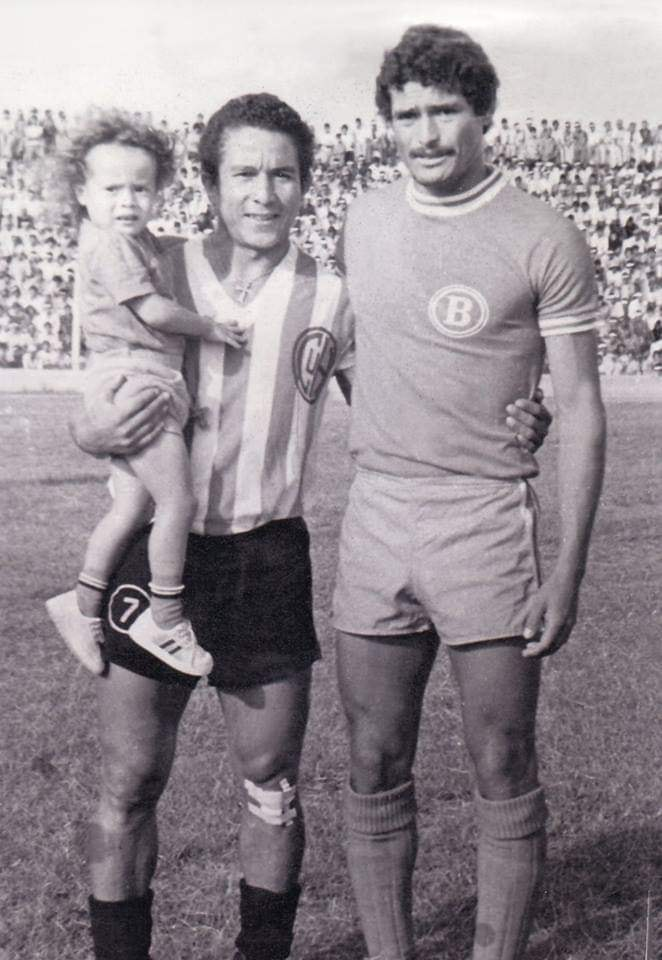
- Baigorria (right) with Alejandro Luces (left) in 1977

Personal information
- Full name: Gerardo Baigorria
- Date of birth: 13 July 1951 (age 75)
- Place of birth: Chimbote, Ancash, Peru
- Position: Defender

Senior career*
Years	Team	Apps	(Gls)
1971	José Galvez		
1972–1976	Sporting Cristal		
1977–1979	Coronel Bolognesi		
1980–1982	Sporting Cristal		
- * Club domestic league appearances and goals

Gerardo Baigorria (born 13 July 1951) is a retired Peruvian footballer. Nicknamed "Tito", he played as a defender for Sporting Cristal and Coronel Bolognesi throughout the 1970s and early 1980s. He would also briefly represent Peru in two occasions in 1979.

== Career ==
Baigorria would begin his career by playing for José Galvez within his home city of Chimbote for the 1971 Torneo Descentralizado. He would then transfer over to Sporting Cristal in which his inaugural season in the club would ultimately lead to the club winning the 1972 season. He would remain in the club until 1976 as he also participated in the 1973 and 1974 Copa Libertadores, playing in the 2–1 win against Universidad Catolica. For the 1977 Torneo Descentralizado, he would sign with Coronel Bolognesi. He would remain with the club for two more seasons before returning to play for Sporting Cristal in the 1980 season in which he would once again, be part of the winning squad. He would play for Los Celestes for the remainder of his career, retiring in 1982 at the age of 31.
