= 2026 Ligas Departamentales del Perú =

Ligas Departamentales del Peru
- Season: 2026

The 2026 Ligas Departamentales, the fifth division of Peruvian football, were played by variable number teams by Departament. The champions and runners-up of each department qualified for the national stage of the 2026 Copa Perú.

== Liga Departamental de Amazonas ==
=== First Stage ===
Team 1	Agg.	Team 2	1st leg	2nd leg
Escuela Pedagógica Pública	7–0	Barza Sport	4–0	3–0
FC San Valentín	0–5	Sport Copallin	0–4	0–1
San Francisco de Asís (Lonya Grande)	6–5	Unión Comercial	4–3	2–2
Cultural Sachapuyos	5–5 (7–8 p)	San Juan de Luya	3–1	2–4
Señor de Aminas	2–3	Juan Pablo II Amazonas	2–3	0–0
Deportivo Paujamarca	4–3	Cultural Huambo	2–2	2–1

=== Quarterfinals ===
Team 1	Agg.	Team 2	1st leg	2nd leg
Cultural Sachapuyos	7–0	Deportivo Paujamarca	2–0	5–0
San Francisco de Asís (Lonya Grande)	2–1	Escuela Pedagógica Pública	1–0	1–1
Sport Copallin	1–3	Unión Comercial	0–2	1–1
San Juan de Luya	3–12	Juan Pablo II Amazonas	2–4	1–8

=== Semifinals ===
Team 1	Agg.	Team 2	1st leg	2nd leg
San Francisco de Asís (Lonya Grande)	3–4	Cultural Sachapuyos	1–0	2–4
Unión Comercial	2–4	Juan Pablo II Amazonas	1–2	1–2

=== Final ===
Team 1	Score	Team 2
Cultural Sachapuyos	4–2	Juan Pablo II Amazonas

== Liga Departamental de Áncash ==
=== First Stage ===
Team 1	Agg.	Team 2	1st leg	2nd leg
Sport Áncash	2–2	Juventud Santa Rosa	10–0	1–2
Unión Santa Fe (Huaylas)	3–6	Defensor Pariahuanca	2–2	1–4
Sport Industrial	2–3	Unión Huallhua	1–2	1–1
Iman Palmira	2–4	San Cristóbal (Yungay)	1–2	1–2
ADECO	2–1	Alakranes Kotup	2–0	0–1
Transporte Pablito	4–1	Coronel Bolognesi	1–1	3–0
Escuela Ramón Castilla	16–1	River Santa	8–0	8–1
Atlético Huascarán	0–12	Alianza Arenal	0–5	0–7
Huaraz FC	3–4	San Idelfonso (Recuay)	2–1	1–3
Atlético Minero (Huari)	9–2	Las Vegas (Ocros)	4–1	5–1
Deportivo Bolívar	0–17	San Andrés de Runtu	0–9	0–8
Deportivo Primavera	4–5	Centro Unión Carrizal	1–1	3–4
Alfonso Ugarte (Huarmey)	2–4	Barcelona Pashpa	1–2	1–2
El Chasqui	2–7	Olivar FC	1–2	1–5
San José (Pallasca)	2–15	Sport Ayash Huamanín	1–4	1–11
Academia Sipesa	8–5	Sport Cañari	6–1	2–4

=== Round of 16 ===
Team 1	Agg.	Team 2	1st leg	2nd leg
Sport Ayash Huamanin	4–3	Academia Sipesa	2–1	2–2
Sport Áncash	5–1	Defensor Pariahuanca	4–0	1–1
Unión Huallhua	6–1	San Cristóbal (Yungay)	3–0	3–1
San Idelfonso (Recuay)	2–3	Atlético Minero (Huari)	1–0	1–3
San Andrés de Runtu	6–0	Centro Unión Carrizal	3–0	3–0
Escuela Ramón Castilla	1–2	Alianza Arenal	1–2	0–0
ADECO	1–4	Transportes Pablito	1–0	0–4
Olivar FC	5–1	Barcelona Pashpa	3–0	2–1

=== Quarterfinals ===
Team 1	Agg.	Team 2	1st leg	2nd leg
Atlético Minero (Huari)	1–3	San Andrés de Runtu	1–1	0–2
Sport Áncash	7–1	Unión Huallhua	6–0	1–1
Transportes Pablito	1–6	Alianza Arenal	0–1	1–5
Olivar FC	1–3	Sport Ayash Huamanin	1–0	0–3

=== Final Group ===
Pos	Team	Pld	W	D	L	GF	GA	GD	Pts	Qualification or relegation	RUN	ARE	ANC	AYA
1	San Andrés de Runtu	5	3	2	0	12	4	+8	11	Advance to 2026 Copa Perú		3–0	2–2	5–2
2	Alianza Arenal	5	3	0	2	7	8	−1	9	Advance to 2026 Copa Perú			3–0	1–0
3	Sport Áncash	5	2	2	1	13	8	+5	8		0–0	5–1		6–2
4	Sport Ayash Huamanin	5	0	0	5	4	16	−12	0		0–2	0–2		

Legend: Blue = home team win; Yellow = draw; Red = away team win.
Rules for classification: 1) Points; 2) Goal difference; 3) Goals for; 4) Fair play points; 5) Drawing of lots.

== Liga Departamental de Apurímac ==
=== First Stage ===
Team 1	Agg.	Team 2	1st leg	2nd leg
Hungaritos de Cupisa	1–11	Unión Minas de Pamputa	0–1	1–10
Halcones del Oro	2–2 (3–4 p)	Apu Wipany	2–2	0–0
Unión Pocohuanca	2–1	FC San Cristóbal	2–0	0–1
Puya Raimondi	0–0 (0–3 p)	Sport Ayerve	0–0	0–0
Real Juventud	1–5	Atlético Sabaino	0–1	1–4
Miguel Grau	2–0	Instituto Apurímac	2–0	0–0
Deportivo San Cristóbal	2–8	Real Apurímac	1–2	1–6

=== Second Stage ===
Team 1	Agg.	Team 2	1st leg	2nd leg
San Cristóbal	1–19	Unión Minas de Pamputa	1–6	0–13
Sport Ayerve	0–2	Real Apurímac	0–1	0–1
Apu Wipany	4–1	Atlético Sabaino	1–0	3–1
Unión Pocohuanca	2–5	Miguel Grau	1–2	1–3

=== Final Group ===
Pos	Team	Pld	W	D	L	GF	GA	GD	Pts	Qualification or relegation	UNI	MIG	APU	REA
1	Unión Minas de Pamputa	6	5	0	1	17	7	+10	15	Advance to 2026 Copa Perú		2–1	3–1	6–0
2	Miguel Grau	6	3	2	1	11	6	+5	11	Advance to 2026 Copa Perú	3–2		2–2	4–0
3	Apu Wipany	6	2	2	2	11	8	+3	8		0–1	0–0		3–2
4	Real Apurímac	6	0	0	6	4	22	−18	0		2–3	0–1	0–5	

Legend: Blue = home team win; Yellow = draw; Red = away team win.
Rules for classification: 1) Points; 2) Goal difference; 3) Goals for; 4) Fair play points; 5) Drawing of lots.

== Liga Departamental de Arequipa ==
=== First Stage ===
Team 1	Agg.	Team 2	1st leg	2nd leg
Viargoca FC	3–1	Deportivo Colón	3–0	0–1
Deportivo Copacabana	4–9	Defensor Agrario	4–4	0–5
Sport Perú	0–2	Juventus Vista Alegre	0–1	0–1
Sport Boys (Mollendo)	1–6	Virgen de las Nieves	1–1	0–5
Deportivo Estrella	1–13	Amigos de la PNP	0–5	1–8
Deportivo Municipal (Majes)	3–4	Deportivo Camaná	1–2	2–2
CIMAC FC	7–4	Espiga Dorada	3–2	4–2

=== Quarterfinals ===
Team 1	Agg.	Team 2	1st leg	2nd leg
Amigos de la PNP	10–2	Defensor Agrario	8–2	2–0
Virgen de las Nieves	3–1	Deportivo Camaná	2–1	1–0
CIMAC FC	0–2	Viargoca FC	0–0	0–2
Juventus Vista Alegre	2–3	Deportivo Colón	2–1	0–2

=== Final Group ===
Pos	Team	Pld	W	D	L	GF	GA	GD	Pts	Qualification or relegation	VIA	NIE	PNP	COL
1	Viargoca FC	6	4	1	1	12	4	+8	13	Advance to 2026 Copa Perú		4–0	1–0	3–0
2	Virgen de las Nieves	6	2	3	1	11	13	−2	9	Advance to 2026 Copa Perú	3–2		3–3	1–1
3	Amigos de la PNP	6	2	2	2	12	9	+3	8		1–1	2–3		3–1
4	Deportivo Colón	6	0	2	4	3	12	−9	2		0–1	1–1	0–3	

Legend: Blue = home team win; Yellow = draw; Red = away team win.
Rules for classification: 1) Points; 2) Goal difference; 3) Goals for; 4) Fair play points; 5) Drawing of lots.

== Liga Departamental de Ayacucho ==
=== First stage ===
Team 1	Agg.	Team 2	1st leg	2nd leg
Villa Barboza	3–3	Mercado de Productores	1–2	2–1
Sport Colca	0–3	Real Coraspampa	0–0	0–3
Valle Ninabamba	4–1	Atlético Tintay	2–0	2–1
Sport Quillque	1–7	Unión Municipal de Aranhuay	1–2	0–5
Atlético Unión La Victoria	0–7	Erasmo Berrocal	0–4	0–3
Federico Villarreal	6–0	AD Rocchacc de Anco	3–0	3–0
Por la Santa FC	0–3	Defensor Patibamba	0–2	0–1
Sport Ochoa Canchacancha	1–1	Los Lobos de Manitea	1–0	0–1
San Pedro de Chilcayocc	6–4	Defensor Ccullupata	2–1	4–3

=== Round of 16 ===
Team 1	Agg.	Team 2	1st leg	2nd leg
Defensor Ccullupata	2–5	Valle Ninabamba	1–2	1–3
Sport Quillque	4–8	Erasmo Berrocal	0–2	4–6
Por la Santa FC	3–2	Unión Municipal de Aranhuay	2–1	1–1
Atlético Tintay	1–7	Federico Villareal	1–4	0–3
Defensor Patibamba	9–0	Sport Colca	7–0	2–0
Sport Ochoa	3–5	San Pedro de Chilcayocc	2–2	1–3
Los Lobos de Manitea	3–2	Real Caraspampa	3–0	0–2
Villa Barboza	2–4	Mercado de Productores	0–2	2–2

=== Quarterfinals ===
Team 1	Agg.	Team 2	1st leg	2nd leg
Erasmo Berrocal	3–6	Mercado de Productores	1–1	2–5
San Pedro de Chilcayocc	2–3	Federico Villareal	2–2	0–1
Por la Santa FC	2–2 (5–4 p)	Los Lobos de Manitea	2–0	0–2
Valle Ninabamba	0–4	Defensor Patibamba	0–2	0–2

=== Semifinals ===
Team 1	Agg.	Team 2	1st leg	2nd leg
Por la Santa FC	2–2 (4–2 p)	Federico Villareal	2–1	0–1
Mercado de Productores	3–5	Defensor Patibamba	1–1	2–4

=== Final ===
Team 1	Score	Team 2
Defensor Patibamba	0–1	Por la Santa FC

== Liga Departamental de Cajamarca ==
=== First stage ===
Team 1	Agg.	Team 2	1st leg	2nd leg
Deportivo Punre	3–3 (4–5 p)	La Viña	1–1	2–2
Juvenil UTC	8–6	Colonia Tongodina	4–2	4–4
Defensor Milpo	3–6	Virgen del Carmen	1–2	2–4
Instituto Tecnológico	1–9	ADA Cajabamba	0–3	1–6
Sport Juventus	7–1	Sport Pilsen	3–0	4–1
Comerciantes Chota	4–2	FC San Carlos	4–1	0–1
AD Internacional	0–2	Las Palmas	0–2	0–0
Deportivo Bracamoros	4–1	FC Olímpico	3–1	1–0
Galaxias Club	3–7	Sangre del Pueblo	2–3	1–4
FC Arena Blanca	5–2	Independiente JPM	4–0	1–2
Unión Chacato	1–4	Deportivo Rodiopampa	1–1	0–4
Juvenil San Juan	3–5	Unión Tembladera	2–1	1–4
Sánchez Carrión	3–2	Familia Verástegui	1–0	2–2
ADC Sol Radiante	3–6	El Combe FC	1–1	2–5

=== Round of 16 ===
Team 1	Agg.	Team 2	1st leg	2nd leg
FC San Carlos	2–7	Las Palmas	1–1	1–6
Sánchez Carrión	1–4	Juvenil UTC	1–0	0–4
Virgen del Carmen	1–4	Sport Juventus	1–1	0–3
Deportivo Rodiopampa	5–7	Sangre del Pueblo	2–4	3–3
Unión Tembladera	0–13	ADA Cajabamba	0–6	0–7
La Viña	0–1	Comerciantes Chota	0–0	0–1
Arena Blanca	5–2	Deportivo Bracamoros	5–2	suspended
Juvenil San Juan	2–8	El Combe FC	2–1	0–7

=== Quarterfinals ===
Team 1	Agg.	Team 2	1st leg	2nd leg
Juvenil UTC	2–6	Sangre del Pueblo	2–3	0–3
Sport Juventus	1–3	Las Palmas	0–0	1–3
Arena Blanca	2–4	ADA Cajabamba	2–1	0–3
Comerciantes Chota	0–1	El Combe FC	0–0	0–1

=== Final Group ===
Pos	Team	Pld	W	D	L	GF	GA	GD	Pts	Qualification or relegation	ADA	COM	PAL	SAN
1	ADA Cajabamba	3	2	1	0	9	2	+7	7	Advance to 2026 Copa Perú			2–2	1–0
2	El Combe FC	3	1	1	1	5	10	−5	4	Advance to 2026 Copa Perú	0–6		2–2	
3	Las Palmas	3	0	3	0	5	5	0	3					1–1
4	Sangre del Pueblo	3	0	1	2	3	5	−2	1			2–3		

Legend: Blue = home team win; Yellow = draw; Red = away team win.
Rules for classification: 1) Points; 2) Goal difference; 3) Goals for; 4) Fair play points; 5) Drawing of lots.

== Liga Departamental del Callao ==
=== Group Stage ===
==== Group A ====
Pos	Team	Pld	W	D	L	GF	GA	GD	Pts	VEN	PEN	JOT	RC8
1	Deportivo Municipal (Ventanilla)	3	2	1	0	7	3	+4	7		3–1		3–1
2	Cultural Peñarol	3	2	0	1	7	5	+2	6			2–0	
3	Los Jotitas	3	1	1	1	3	3	0	4	1–1			
4	Academia RC8	3	0	0	3	3	9	−6	0		2–4	0–2	

Updated to match(es) played on unknown. Source: Liga Departamental del Callao
Legend: Blue = home team win; Yellow = draw; Red = away team win.

==== Group B ====
Pos	Team	Pld	W	D	L	GF	GA	GD	Pts	EST	HSA	INT	GEN
1	Estrella Roja	3	2	0	1	5	4	+1	6			2–1	
2	Hacienda San Agustín	3	1	2	0	4	3	+1	5	2–1			2–2
3	Íntimos de Reynoso	3	1	1	1	6	4	+2	4		0–0		
4	Deportivo Gentlemen	3	0	1	2	5	9	−4	1	1–2		2–5	

Updated to match(es) played on unknown. Source: Liga Departamental del Callao
Legend: Blue = home team win; Yellow = draw; Red = away team win.

==== Group C ====
Pos	Team	Pld	W	D	L	GF	GA	GD	Pts	PAL	TOD	CAL	STE
1	Juventud Palmeiras	3	3	0	0	10	3	+7	9		4–1	2–1	
2	Defensor Todos Unidos	3	2	0	1	10	5	+5	6			2–1	
3	Calidad Porteña	3	1	0	2	4	4	0	3				2–0
4	Stella Maris	3	0	0	3	1	13	−12	0	1–4	0–7		

Updated to match(es) played on unknown. Source: Liga Departamental del Callao
Legend: Blue = home team win; Yellow = draw; Red = away team win.

==== Group D ====
Pos	Team	Pld	W	D	L	GF	GA	GD	Pts	JOB	PAC	SMN	UNI
1	FC JOB 05	3	2	1	0	5	2	+3	7				2–1
2	Pachapool FC	3	1	2	0	4	2	+2	5	0–0			
3	Santa Marina Norte	3	1	1	1	5	4	+1	4	1–3	1–1		
4	Unión Nacional	3	0	0	3	1	8	−7	0		1–3	0–3	

Updated to match(es) played on unknown. Source: Liga Departamental del Callao
Legend: Blue = home team win; Yellow = draw; Red = away team win.

=== Quarterfinals ===
Team 1	Score	Team 2
FC JOB 05	0–3	Hacienda San Agustín
Estrella Roja	4–3	Pachapool FC
Juventud Palmeiras	2–0	Cultural Peñarol
Deportivo Municipal (Ventanilla)	1–2	Defensor Todos Unidos

=== Semifinals ===
Team 1	Score	Team 2
Juventud Palmeiras	1–1 (3–1 p)	Hacienda San Agustín
Defensor Todos Unidos	1–1 (1–4 p)	Estrella Roja

=== Final ===
Team 1	Score	Team 2
Estrella Roja	1–3	Juventud Palmeiras

== Liga Departamental del Cusco ==
=== Group stage ===
==== Group A ====
Pos	Team	Pld	W	D	L	GF	GA	GD	Pts	UNI	VIN	DIA	ORL
1	UNISPA	6	5	0	1	18	2	+16	15		2–0	3–0	5–1
2	Vinicunca FC	6	5	0	1	18	5	+13	15	1–0		5–1	5–1
3	Diablos Rojos Ccollachapi	6	1	0	5	8	21	−13	3	0–3	0–3		4–2
4	Orleans Goleman	6	1	0	5	7	26	−19	3	0–5	1–4	5–3	

Updated to match(es) played on unknown. Source: Liga Departamental de Cusco
Legend: Blue = home team win; Yellow = draw; Red = away team win.

==== Group B ====
Pos	Team	Pld	W	D	L	GF	GA	GD	Pts	UPC	CCO	AGG	UHU
1	Unión Porvenir de Coya	6	5	1	0	29	9	+20	16		2–1	7–1	4–2
2	Deportivo Ccorimayo	6	3	0	3	11	16	−5	9	1–8		1–0	3–0
3	Agustín Gamarra	6	2	0	4	11	18	−7	6	1–5	5–3		4–1
4	Unión Huáscar	6	1	1	4	8	16	−8	4	3–3	1–2	1–0	

Updated to match(es) played on unknown. Source: Liga Departamental de Cusco
Legend: Blue = home team win; Yellow = draw; Red = away team win.

==== Group C ====
Pos	Team	Pld	W	D	L	GF	GA	GD	Pts	DIO	MAN	AZA
1	Defensor Independiente Ollantaytambo	4	2	0	2	7	6	+1	6		2–1	3–0
2	Manco II	4	2	0	2	5	4	+1	6	3–1		1–0
3	Alianza Zarzuela	4	2	0	2	3	5	−2	6	2–1	1–0	

Updated to match(es) played on unknown. Source: Liga Departamental de Cusco
Legend: Blue = home team win; Yellow = draw; Red = away team win.

==== Group D ====
Pos	Team	Pld	W	D	L	GF	GA	GD	Pts	JUV	HUA	TUP	WIN
1	Juventus Estrellas	6	5	0	1	16	7	+9	15		0–2	4–1	4–2
2	Deportivo Huayruro	6	4	1	1	9	5	+4	13	0–3		2–1	4–1
3	Túpac Amarú	6	1	1	4	8	14	−6	4	2–3	0–0		1–3
4	Cultural Wiñay Llaqta	6	1	0	5	8	15	−7	3	0–2	0–1	2–3	

Updated to match(es) played on unknown. Source: Liga Departamental de Cusco
Legend: Blue = home team win; Yellow = draw; Red = away team win.

==== Group E ====
Pos	Team	Pld	W	D	L	GF	GA	GD	Pts	AJI	MIL	MUR	PIL
1	AJI	6	6	0	0	25	5	+20	18		3–2	3–0	11–1
2	Millonarios	6	3	0	3	9	9	0	9	2–3		1–0	2–1
3	Deportivo Municipal (Urcos)	5	1	1	3	2	9	−7	4	0–4	1–0		1–1
4	Social Pilcopata	5	0	1	4	4	17	−13	1	0–1	1–2	n.p.	

Updated to match(es) played on unknown. Source: Liga Departamental de Cusco
Legend: Blue = home team win; Yellow = draw; Red = away team win.

==== Group F ====
Pos	Team	Pld	W	D	L	GF	GA	GD	Pts	PAR	LID	JES
1	Palma Real	4	3	1	0	7	4	+3	10		3–2	1–0
2	Lider Ollanta	4	1	2	1	6	6	0	5	1–1		1–1
3	Jesuscelense	4	0	1	3	3	6	−3	1	1–2	1–2	

Updated to match(es) played on unknown. Source: Liga Departamental de Cusco
Legend: Blue = home team win; Yellow = draw; Red = away team win.

=== Quarterfinals ===
Team 1	Agg.	Team 2	1st leg	2nd leg
Unión Porvenir de Coya	3–6	UNISPA	2–1	1–5
Deportivo Huayruro	5–2	Palma Real	5–0	0–2
AJI	4–3	Juventus Estrellas	2–1	2–2
Vinicunca FC	5–1	Defensor Independiente Ollantaytambo	2–0	3–1

=== Semifinals ===
Team 1	Agg.	Team 2	1st leg	2nd leg
UNISPA	2–2 (4–5 p)	Vinicunca FC	0–1	2–1
Deportivo Huayruro	4–3	AJI	1–0	3–2

=== Final ===
Team 1	Score	Team 2
Vinicunca FC	2–1	Deportivo Huayruro

== Liga Departamental de Huancavelica ==
=== First stage ===
Team 1	Agg.	Team 2	1st leg	2nd leg
ADHES	2–13	Sport Machete	0–3	2–10
San Martín de Mayunmarca	1–9	Heraldos Negros	0–7	1–2
Sport Águila	3–5	Diablos Rojos	2–3	1–2

=== Final group ===
Pos	Team	Pld	W	D	L	GF	GA	GD	Pts	Qualification or relegation	MAC	HER	DIA	AGU
1	Sport Machete	6	5	1	0	21	7	+14	16	Advance to 2026 Copa Perú		2–2	3–2	5–0
2	Heraldos Negros	6	3	2	1	19	9	+10	11	Advance to 2026 Copa Perú	2–3		4–0	6–1
3	Diablos Rojos	6	2	1	3	18	19	−1	7		1–5	3–3		6–2
4	Sport Águila	6	0	0	6	5	28	−23	0		0–3	0–2	2–6	

Updated to match(es) played on unknown. Source: Liga Departamental de Huancavelica
Legend: Blue = home team win; Yellow = draw; Red = away team win.

== Liga Departamental de Huánuco ==
=== First stage ===
Team 1	Agg.	Team 2	1st leg	2nd leg
Canteras Bernabéu	6–1	Sport Cachicoto	4–0	2–1
Pericos FC	2–3	Miguel Grau UDH	2–1	0–2
Alfonso Ugarte Marona	1–12	Atlético EVZA	1–3	0–9
Los Galácticos	2–3	Juventus Bella	0–1	2–2
Muni Huayranga	1–1 (4–3 p)	La Morada	0–0	1–1
Unión Paraíso	0–4	Constructores de Uchiza	0–4	0–0
Paucaco	2–6	Deportivo Municipal (Chacos)	1–2	1–4
Ángeles San Rafael	4–4 (1–3 p)	Social Molinos	1–0	–
San Pedro de Muña	2–2 (3–4 p)	Castle FC	1–1	1–1
Juventud Tingo Chico	1–2	Atlético Cochapampa	0–0	1–2
Santa Rosa Ayapiteg	2–4	San Miguel (Huacaybamba)	1–1	1–3
San José (Huacaybamba)	9–2	Real Huancachaca	6–1	3–1

=== Second stage ===
Team 1	Agg.	Team 2	1st leg	2nd leg
Constructores de Uchiza	3–3 (5–6 p)	Juventus Bella	1–0	2–3
Castle FC	4–2	Miguel Grau UDH	1–0	3–2
Canteras Bernabéu	5–4	San José (Huacaybamba)	2–1	3–3
San Miguel (Huacaybamba)	2–3	Atlético Cochapampa	1–2	1–1
Social Molinos	0–4	Atlético EVZA	0–0	0–4
Deportivo Municipal (Chacos)	4–2	Muni Huayranga	2–1	2–1

=== Third stage ===
Team 1	Agg.	Team 2	1st leg	2nd leg
Atlético EVZA	2–1	Castle FC	1–1	1–0
Canteras Bernabéu	3–2	Atlético Cochapampa	0–0	3–2
Juventus Bella	0–4	Deportivo Municipal (Chacos)	0–2	0–2

==== Playoff: Best Loser (Second stage) vs. Best Loser (Third stage) ====
Team 1	Score	Team 2
Constructores de Uchiza	4–1	Atlético Cochapampa

=== Semifinals ===
Team 1	Agg.	Team 2	1st leg	2nd leg
Canteras Bernabéu	1–5	Atlético EVZA	0–5	1–0
Constructores de Uchiza	3–1	Deportivo Municipal (Chacos)	2–0	1–1

=== Final ===
Team 1	Score	Team 2
Constructores de Uchiza	0–1	Atlético EVZA

== Liga Departamental de Ica ==
=== Semifinals ===
Team 1	Agg.	Team 2	1st leg	2nd leg
Domingo Dianderas	2–2 (3–4 p)	Defensor Municipal	1–1	1–1
DAT Agropecuarios	3–2	Juventud Ccontac	1–1	2–1
Lolo Fernández	4–2	Sporting Cristal (Parcona)	2–2	2–0
Bad Boys	2–0	Juventud Real Miraflores	2–0	0–0
Juventud Santa Fe	3–1	Juventud Lircay	1–0	2–1
Atlético Nacional	2–1	AD Huampullo	1–1	1–0

=== Quarterfinals ===
Team 1	Agg.	Team 2	1st leg	2nd leg
Juventud Ccontac	0–1	Atlético Nacional	0–1	0–0
Lolo Fernández	3–1	Defensor Municipal	2–1	1–1
Bad Boys	2–2 (5–4 p)	Juventud Santa Fe	1–0	1–2
Domingo Dianderas	3–1	DAT Agropecuarios	3–0	0–1

=== Semifinals ===
Team 1	Agg.	Team 2	1st leg	2nd leg
Atlético Nacional	1–2	Domingo Dianderas	0–0	1–2
Lolo Fernández	2–4	Bad Boys	0–4	2–0

=== Final ===
Team 1	Score	Team 2
Domingo Dianderas	2–0	Bad Boys

== Liga Departamental de Junín ==
=== Group Stage ===
==== Group A ====
Pos	Team	Pld	W	D	L	GF	GA	GD	Pts	SUM	MUN	RAC	GEN
1	Atlético Suma Motors	3	3	0	0	12	1	+11	9			4–0	6–0
2	Deportivo Municipal (Usibamba)	3	2	0	1	8	5	+3	6	1–2		4–2	
3	Racing Satipo	3	1	0	2	9	8	+1	3				7–0
4	Generación Familia	3	0	0	3	1	16	−15	0		1–3		

Legend: Blue = home team win; Yellow = draw; Red = away team win.
Rules for classification: 1) Points; 2) Goal difference; 3) Goals for; 4) Fair play points; 5) Drawing of lots.

==== Group B ====
Pos	Team	Pld	W	D	L	GF	GA	GD	Pts	CHA	JUA	CON	ALI
1	Atlético Chanchamayo	3	2	0	1	7	4	+3	6		1–2		3–1
2	Juventud Alianza	3	1	2	0	5	4	+1	5			1–1	
3	Defensor Concepción	3	1	1	1	5	6	−1	4	1–3			3–2
4	Alipio Ponce	3	0	1	2	5	8	−3	1		2–2		

Legend: Blue = home team win; Yellow = draw; Red = away team win.
Rules for classification: 1) Points; 2) Goal difference; 3) Goals for; 4) Fair play points; 5) Drawing of lots.

==== Group C ====
Pos	Team	Pld	W	D	L	GF	GA	GD	Pts	PAC	MOL	PER	CON
1	Asociación Paccha Chico	3	2	0	1	2	1	+1	6			1–0	0–1
2	Familia Molina	3	1	1	1	1	1	0	4	0–1			
3	Unión Perené	3	1	1	1	1	1	0	4		0–0		1–0
4	Asociación Cóndor	3	1	0	2	1	2	−1	3		0–1		

Legend: Blue = home team win; Yellow = draw; Red = away team win.
Rules for classification: 1) Points; 2) Goal difference; 3) Goals for; 4) Fair play points; 5) Drawing of lots.

==== Group D ====
Pos	Team	Pld	W	D	L	GF	GA	GD	Pts	COR	COC	CAN	MEZ
1	Defensor Cormis	3	2	1	0	6	2	+4	7		1–1	3–0	
2	Juventud Cocaya	3	2	1	0	9	1	+8	7			2–0	6–0
3	Los Canarios	3	1	0	2	2	6	−4	3				2–1
4	Ferretería Meza	3	0	0	3	2	10	−8	0	1–2			

Legend: Blue = home team win; Yellow = draw; Red = away team win.
Rules for classification: 1) Points; 2) Goal difference; 3) Goals for; 4) Fair play points; 5) Drawing of lots.

==== Group E ====
Pos	Team	Pld	W	D	L	GF	GA	GD	Pts	CES	MUN	PRO	UCU
1	CESA	3	3	0	0	10	1	+9	9		2–0		7–1
2	Deportivo Municipal (La Oroya)	3	2	0	1	6	4	+2	6				4–2
3	Progreso (Tayacaja)	3	1	0	2	1	3	−2	3	0–1	0–2		
4	Nueva Juventud Ucurán	3	0	0	3	3	12	−9	0			0–1	

Legend: Blue = home team win; Yellow = draw; Red = away team win.
Rules for classification: 1) Points; 2) Goal difference; 3) Goals for; 4) Fair play points; 5) Drawing of lots.

=== Second stage ===
==== Group A ====
Pos	Team	Pld	W	D	L	GF	GA	GD	Pts	SUM	MUN	COR	CON
1	Atlético Sumar Motors	3	2	1	0	6	1	+5	7		1–1	3–0	
2	Deportivo Municipal (Yauli)	3	1	2	0	5	2	+3	5			1–1	3–0
3	Defensor Cormis	3	0	2	1	2	5	−3	2				1–1
4	Asociación Deportivo Cóndor	3	0	1	2	1	6	−5	1	0–2			

Updated to match(es) played on unknown. Source: Liga Departamental de Junín
Legend: Blue = home team win; Yellow = draw; Red = away team win.

==== Group B ====
Pos	Team	Pld	W	D	L	GF	GA	GD	Pts	CES	PAC	CAN	RAC
1	CESA	3	2	1	0	7	2	+5	7				3–0
2	Asociación Paccha Chico	3	2	1	0	3	0	+3	7	0–0		1–0	
3	Los Canarios	2	0	0	2	2	5	−3	0	2–1			n.p.
4	Racing Satipo	2	0	0	2	0	5	−5	0		0–2		

Updated to match(es) played on unknown. Source: Liga Departamental de Junín
Legend: Blue = home team win; Yellow = draw; Red = away team win.

==== Group C ====
Pos	Team	Pld	W	D	L	GF	GA	GD	Pts	USI	CHA	PRO	FAM
1	Deportivo Municipal (Usibamba)	3	2	1	0	6	2	+4	7			1–0	
2	Atlético Chanchamayo	3	1	1	1	5	3	+2	4	0–3			5–0
3	Progreso (Tayacaja)	3	1	1	1	2	2	0	4		0–0		2–1
4	Familia Molina	3	0	1	2	3	9	−6	1	2–2			

Updated to match(es) played on unknown. Source: Liga Departamental de Junín
Legend: Blue = home team win; Yellow = draw; Red = away team win.

==== Group D ====
Pos	Team	Pld	W	D	L	GF	GA	GD	Pts	JUA	DCO	PER	COC
1	Juventud Alianza	3	2	0	1	6	4	+2	6			2–1	3–1
2	Defensor Concepción	3	2	0	1	6	5	+1	6	2–1		2–3	
3	Unión Perené	3	2	0	1	5	4	+1	6				1–0
4	Juventud Cocaya	3	0	0	3	2	6	−4	0		1–2		

Updated to match(es) played on unknown. Source: Liga Departamental de Junín
Legend: Blue = home team win; Yellow = draw; Red = away team win.

=== Third stage ===
==== Group A ====
Pos	Team	Pld	W	D	L	GF	GA	GD	Pts	SUM	CON	PAC	MUN
1	Atlético Sumar Motors	3	2	0	1	4	2	+2	6		2–0	0–1	
2	Defensor Concepción	3	2	0	1	5	3	+2	6			1–0	4–1
3	Asociación Paccha Chico	3	1	1	1	1	1	0	4				0–0
4	Deportivo Municipal (La Oroya)	3	0	1	2	2	6	−4	1	1–2			

Updated to match(es) played on unknown. Source: Liga Departamental de Junín
Legend: Blue = home team win; Yellow = draw; Red = away team win.

==== Group B ====
Pos	Team	Pld	W	D	L	GF	GA	GD	Pts	CES	CHA	JUA	USI
1	CESA	3	2	1	0	7	2	+5	7		1–1	1–0	
2	Atlético Chanchamayo	3	1	1	1	4	2	+2	4			3–0	
3	Juventud Alianza	3	1	0	2	1	4	−3	3				1–0
4	Deportivo Municipal (Usibamba)	3	1	0	2	2	6	−4	3	1–5	1–0		

Updated to match(es) played on unknown. Source: Liga Departamental de Junín
Legend: Blue = home team win; Yellow = draw; Red = away team win.

=== Fourth stage ===
Pos	Team	Pld	W	D	L	GF	GA	GD	Pts	Qualification or relegation	CES	CHA	SUM	CON
1	CESA	3	3	0	0	5	1	+4	9	Advance to 2026 Copa Perú		1–0		2–0
2	Atlético Chanchamayo	3	2	0	1	2	1	+1	6	Advance to 2026 Copa Perú			1–0	
3	Atlético Sumar Motors	2	0	0	2	1	3	−2	0		1–2			n.p.
4	Defensor Concepción	2	0	0	2	0	3	−3	0			0–1		

Updated to match(es) played on unknown. Source: Liga Departamental de Junín
Legend: Blue = home team win; Yellow = draw; Red = away team win.

== Liga Departamental de La Libertad ==
=== Group Stage ===
==== Group A ====
Pos	Team	Pld	W	D	L	GF	GA	GD	Pts	JBE	ADE	PAL	OLA
1	Juventud Bellavista	6	6	0	0	32	2	+30	18		3–1	7–0	14–0
2	ADEJ	5	3	0	2	16	9	+7	9	0–2		3–2	10–2
3	Palmeiras (Pacasmayo)	6	1	0	5	8	19	−11	3	1–3	0–2		3–0
4	Comunidad José Olaya	5	1	0	4	6	32	−26	3	0–3	n.p.	4–2	

Legend: Blue = home team win; Yellow = draw; Red = away team win.
Rules for classification: 1) Points; 2) Goal difference; 3) Goals for; 4) Fair play points; 5) Drawing of lots.

==== Group B ====
Pos	Team	Pld	W	D	L	GF	GA	GD	Pts	RIV	MAS	PSI	PRE
1	Sport River	6	5	1	0	37	1	+36	16		2–1	14–0	6–0
2	Mariscal Sucre (Chepén)	6	4	1	1	19	6	+13	13	0–0		7–0	2–0
3	Pampas de San Isidro	6	1	1	4	6	41	−35	4	0–11	2–6		2–2
4	La Premier	6	0	1	5	5	19	−14	1	0–4	2–3	1–2	

Legend: Blue = home team win; Yellow = draw; Red = away team win.
Rules for classification: 1) Points; 2) Goal difference; 3) Goals for; 4) Fair play points; 5) Drawing of lots.

==== Group C ====
Pos	Team	Pld	W	D	L	GF	GA	GD	Pts	INC	LLA	MAC	OVA
1	El Inca	6	4	1	1	15	6	+9	13		0–0	2–0	7–2
2	Unión Juventud Llacuabamba	6	3	3	0	13	5	+8	12	1–0		3–3	4–0
3	Defensor Macabí	6	2	2	2	13	10	+3	8	1–2	1–1		3–0
4	Defensor El Óvalo	6	0	0	6	7	27	−20	0	2–4	1–4	2–5	

Legend: Blue = home team win; Yellow = draw; Red = away team win.
Rules for classification: 1) Points; 2) Goal difference; 3) Goals for; 4) Fair play points; 5) Drawing of lots.

==== Group D ====
Pos	Team	Pld	W	D	L	GF	GA	GD	Pts	HUA	AMA	ARR	TIZ
1	Sporting Huamachuco	6	5	0	1	18	8	+10	15		3–2	6–1	3–0
2	Amaro Alza	6	4	1	1	26	8	+18	13	4–0		3–0	1–1
3	Arriba Perú	5	1	0	4	7	21	−14	3	0–2	3–9		n.p.
4	Unión Tizal	5	0	1	4	4	18	−14	1	1–4	1–7	1–3	

Legend: Blue = home team win; Yellow = draw; Red = away team win.
Rules for classification: 1) Points; 2) Goal difference; 3) Goals for; 4) Fair play points; 5) Drawing of lots.

=== Semifinals ===
Team 1	Agg.	Team 2	1st leg	2nd leg
Juventud Bellavista	1–4	Sport River	1–3	0–1
El Inca	3–1	Sporting Huamachuco	2–0	1–1

=== Final ===
Team 1	Score	Team 2
Sport River	4–2	El Inca

== Liga Departamental de Lambayeque ==
=== Group stage ===
==== Group A ====
Pos	Team	Pld	W	D	L	GF	GA	GD	Pts	TUM	CAS	VIC	GRA
1	Deportivo Tumi	3	3	0	0	7	3	+4	9			3–1	1–0
2	Castaños FC	3	2	0	1	8	5	+3	6	2–3			4–1
3	Sport Victoria	3	1	0	2	4	5	−1	3		1–2		
4	Defensor Grau	3	0	0	3	1	7	−6	0			0–2	

Updated to match(es) played on unknown. Source: Liga Departamental de Lambayeque
Legend: Blue = home team win; Yellow = draw; Red = away team win.

==== Group B ====
Pos	Team	Pld	W	D	L	GF	GA	GD	Pts	SMI	VAS	MUL	TIF
1	Deportivo San Miguel	3	2	1	0	4	2	+2	7			2–1	1–0
2	Vasco de Gama	3	1	1	1	5	3	+2	4	1–1			1–2
3	Sport Mulato	3	1	0	2	4	6	−2	3		0–3		
4	Sport Tifón	3	1	0	2	3	5	−2	3			1–3	

Updated to match(es) played on unknown. Source: Liga Departamental de Lambayeque
Legend: Blue = home team win; Yellow = draw; Red = away team win.

==== Group C ====
Pos	Team	Pld	W	D	L	GF	GA	GD	Pts	POM	CAC	TAM	LUJ
1	Deportivo Pomalca	3	2	0	1	7	7	0	6		0–5		3–1
2	Cachorro	3	3	0	0	9	1	+8	9			3–1	
3	Asociación Tambo Real	3	1	0	2	3	7	−4	3	1–4			
4	Unión Luján	3	0	0	3	1	5	−4	0		0–1	0–1	

Updated to match(es) played on unknown. Source: Liga Departamental de Lambayeque
Legend: Blue = home team win; Yellow = draw; Red = away team win.

==== Group D ====
Pos	Team	Pld	W	D	L	GF	GA	GD	Pts	SMA	AUR	SRO	DOM
1	Unión Juventud San Martín	3	2	1	0	12	4	+8	7			1–1	
2	Juan Aurich (Reque)	3	2	0	1	10	3	+7	6	1–3			4–0
3	Deportivo Santa Rosa	3	1	1	1	8	7	+1	4		0–5		6–0
4	Dos de Mayo	3	0	0	3	1	17	−16	0	1–7			

Updated to match(es) played on unknown. Source: Liga Departamental de Lambayeque
Legend: Blue = home team win; Yellow = draw; Red = away team win.

==== Group E ====
Pos	Team	Pld	W	D	L	GF	GA	GD	Pts	CHA	ZEL	SJB	BOL
1	Cruz de Chalpón	3	3	0	0	10	0	+10	9				4–0
2	Zelada Jr.	3	2	0	1	11	4	+7	6	0–2		6–1	
3	San Juan Bautista	3	1	0	2	3	11	−8	3	0–4			
4	Defensor Bolognesi	3	0	0	3	2	11	−9	0		1–5	1–2	

Updated to match(es) played on unknown. Source: Liga Departamental de Lambayeque
Legend: Blue = home team win; Yellow = draw; Red = away team win.

=== Round of 16 ===
Team 1	Agg.	Team 2	1st leg	2nd leg
Sport Tifón	4–4 (4–5 p)	Deportivo Tumi	4–2	0–2
AD Tambo Real	0–9	Cachorro	0–8	0–1
Deportivo Pomalca	0–6	Castaños FC	0–3	0–3
Deportivo Santa Rosa	3–4	Zelada Jr.	2–3	1–1
Vasco da Gama	4–1	Juan Aurich (Reque)	1–0	3–1
Sport Victoria	1–3	Deportivo San Miguel	1–0	0–3
Cruz de Chalpón	11–0	San Juan Bautista	4–0	7–0
Sport Mulato	8–4	Unión Juventud San Martín	4–2	4–2

=== Quarterfinals ===
Team 1	Agg.	Team 2	1st leg	2nd leg
Deportivo Tumi	1–2 (4–2 p)	Zelada Jr.	1–0	0–2
Castaños	2–3	Cruz de Chalpón	2–2	0–1
San Miguel	3–3 (5–6 p)	Sport Mulato	2–2	1–1
Vasco da Gama	3–7	Cachorro	1–4	2–3

=== Semifinals ===
Team 1	Agg.	Team 2	1st leg	2nd leg
Deportivo Tumi	0–3	Cruz de Chalpón	0–0	0–3
Sport Mulato	2–6	Cachorro	1–2	1–4

=== Final ===
Team 1	Score	Team 2
Cruz de Chalpón	1–3	Cachorro

== Liga Departamental de Lima ==
=== First Stage ===
Team 1	Agg.	Team 2	1st leg	2nd leg
Arsenal Lawn Tennis	3–2	Juventud Naturales	3–1	0–1
Alianza San Mateo	0–4	AIPSA	0–1	0–3
Walter Ormeño	2–3	Sport Humaya	1–3	1–0
Defensor Cahua	0–11	Bella Esperanza	0–2	0–9
Barcelona Caqui	3–1	Relámpágo Huanchipuquio	2–1	1–0
Juventud Puente Bolívar	1–1	San Juan Bosco	0–1	1–0
Juventud Molino	4–3	Regatas Lima	2–0	2–3
FC Cupiche	1–0	Sport Santa Rosa	0–0	1–0
América Santa Isabel	0–1	Deportivo Potao	0–1	0–0
Peñarol San Mateo	1–4	Nicolás de Piérola	0–1	1–3
Deportivo Municipal	2–1	Defensor Santa Teresa	2–1	0–0
Alianza Quepepampa	3–1	Deportivo Huracán	1–0	2–1

=== Round of 16 ===
Team 1	Agg.	Team 2	1st leg	2nd leg
Regatas Lima	3–2	Nicolás de Piérola	2–2	1–0
San Juan Bosco	3–0	Barcelona Caqui	0–0	3–0 (W.O.)
Juventud Molino	0–1	FC Cupiche	0–0	0–1
Arsenal Lawn Tennis	2–2 (9–8 p)	Deportivo Potao	2–0	0–2
Walter Ormeño	1–3	Bella Eperanza	0–1	1–2
Juventud Naturales	5–3	AIPSA	4–2	1–1
Juventud Puente Bolívar	4–0	Alianza Quepepampa	1–0	3–0 (W.O.)
Sport Humaya	4–4 (4–1 p)	Deportivo Municipal	2–2	2–2

=== Quarterfinals ===
Team 1	Agg.	Team 2	1st leg	2nd leg
FC Cupiche	0–3	Bella Eperanza	0–1	0–2
Sport Humaya	1–2	Regatas Lima	1–1	0–1
San Juan Bosco	2–3	Juventud Puente Bolívar	1–1	1–2
Arsenal Lawn Tennis	4–2	Juventud Naturales	2–2	2–0

=== Semifinals ===
Team 1	Agg.	Team 2	1st leg	2nd leg
Regatas Lima	1–2	Bella Eperanza	0–0	1–2
Juventud Puente Bolívar	1–3	Arsenal Lawn Tennis	0–0	1–3

=== Final ===
Team 1	Score	Team 2
Bella Eperanza	1–0	Arsenal Lawn Tennis

== Liga Departamental de Loreto ==
=== First stage ===
==== Group A ====
Pos	Team	Pld	W	D	L	GF	GA	GD	Pts	UNA	LOL	ACU	AYA
1	UNAP	3	3	0	0	3	0	+3	9		1–0		
2	Escuela Lolo Fernández	3	2	0	1	4	1	+3	6				
3	ACUDECANA	3	1	0	2	5	5	0	3	0–1	0–2		
4	Athletic Fútbol Ayahuasca	3	0	0	3	2	8	−6	0	0–1	0–2	2–5	

Updated to match(es) played on unknown. Source: Liga Departamental de Loreto
Legend: Blue = home team win; Yellow = draw; Red = away team win.

==== Group B ====
Pos	Team	Pld	W	D	L	GF	GA	GD	Pts	CES	DIN	TRO
1	Cerro Escalera	2	2	0	0	6	1	+5	6			
2	AFC Dínamo	2	0	1	1	3	5	−2	1	0–2		3–3
3	Athletic Municipal de Trompeteros	2	0	1	1	4	7	−3	1	1–4		

Updated to match(es) played on unknown. Source: Liga Departamental de Loreto
Legend: Blue = home team win; Yellow = draw; Red = away team win.

==== Group C ====
Pos	Team	Pld	W	D	L	GF	GA	GD	Pts	ATN	ROJ	GAM	SAN
1	Atlético Nacional	3	3	0	0	15	2	+13	9		4–1		
2	MERV	2	0	0	2	2	6	−4	0				
3	Gambeta AFC	3	1	0	2	5	7	−2	3	0–2	2–1		3–4
4	Juventud de Barrio Bajo	2	1	0	1	5	12	−7	3	1–9			

Updated to match(es) played on unknown. Source: Liga Departamental de Loreto
Legend: Blue = home team win; Yellow = draw; Red = away team win.

==== Group D ====
Pos	Team	Pld	W	D	L	GF	GA	GD	Pts	TAR	ALF	CAB
1	AD Tarapacá	2	1	1	0	5	3	+2	4		1–1	4–2
2	Alfonso Ugarte (Ucayali)	2	1	1	0	4	1	+3	4			
3	Deportivo Municipal (Caballococha)	2	0	0	2	2	7	−5	0		0–3	

Updated to match(es) played on unknown. Source: Liga Departamental de Loreto
Legend: Blue = home team win; Yellow = draw; Red = away team win.

===== Tiebreaker =====
Team 1	Score	Team 2
AD Tarapacá	2–0	Alfonso Ugarte (Ucayali)

=== Second stage ===
Pos	Team	Pld	W	D	L	GF	GA	GD	Pts	Qualification or relegation	NAC	UNA	CER	TAR
1	Atlético Nacional	3	2	0	1	3	3	0	6	Advance to 2026 Copa Perú			1–0	2–1
2	UNAP	3	1	2	0	3	1	+2	5	Advance to 2026 Copa Perú	2–0		0–0	1–1
3	Cerro Escalera	3	1	1	1	4	2	+2	4					
4	AD Tarapacá	3	0	1	2	3	7	−4	1				1–4	

Updated to match(es) played on unknown. Source: Liga Departamental de Loreto
Legend: Blue = home team win; Yellow = draw; Red = away team win.

== Liga Departamental de Madre de Dios ==
=== Semifinals ===
Team 1	Agg.	Team 2	1st leg	2nd leg
Delta Uno	3–11	ADEVIL	1–6	2–5
Los Potrillos	1–3	La Masía Nace	0–0	1–3

=== Final ===
Team 1	Agg.	Team 2	1st leg	2nd leg
ADEVIL	3–2	La Masía Nace	2–1	1–1

== Liga Departamental de Moquegua ==
=== Standings ===
Pos	Team	Pld	W	D	L	GF	GA	GD	Pts	Qualification or relegation	LIB	HUR	MAR	ENE
1	Liberty School College	6	5	1	0	13	3	+10	16	Advance to 2026 Copa Perú		6–1	2–1	3–1
2	Atlético Huracán	6	2	2	2	7	11	−4	8	Advance to 2026 Copa Perú	0–0		2–2	1–2
3	Mariscal Nieto	5	1	1	3	6	6	0	4		0–1	0–1		n.p
4	Deportivo Enersur	5	1	0	4	4	10	−6	3		0–1	1–2	0–3	

Updated to match(es) played on unknown. Source: Liga Departamental de Moquegua
Legend: Blue = home team win; Yellow = draw; Red = away team win.

== Liga Departamental de Pasco ==
=== First Stage ===
Team 1	Agg.	Team 2	1st leg	2nd leg
AD Tambo	4–2	Deportivo Municipal (Santa Ana)	2–2	2–0
Industrias Jr.	1–7	Sociedad Tiro 28	1–1	0–6
UDY	0–5	Academia Pepe	0–3	0–2

=== Final Group ===
Pos	Team	Pld	W	D	L	GF	GA	GD	Pts	Qualification or relegation	TIR	PEP	ADT
1	Sociedad Tiro 28	2	2	0	0	14	0	+14	6	Advance to 2026 Copa Perú		12–0	
2	Academia Pepe	2	1	0	1	1	12	−11	3	Advance to 2026 Copa Perú			1–0
3	AD Tambo	2	0	0	2	0	3	−3	0		0–2		

Legend: Blue = home team win; Yellow = draw; Red = away team win.
Rules for classification: 1) Points; 2) Goal difference; 3) Goals for; 4) Fair play points; 5) Drawing of lots.

== Liga Departamental de Piura ==
=== Group stage ===
==== Group A ====
Pos	Team	Pld	W	D	L	GF	GA	GD	Pts	JIB	SAN	AYA
1	Jibaja Che	4	4	0	0	10	0	+10	12		2–0	3–0
2	Academia San Antonio	4	2	0	2	6	4	+2	6	0–2		0–3
3	Deportivo Municipal (Ayabaca)	4	0	0	4	0	12	−12	0	0–3	0–3	

Updated to match(es) played on unknown. Source: Liga Departamental de Piura
Legend: Blue = home team win; Yellow = draw; Red = away team win.

==== Group B ====
Pos	Team	Pld	W	D	L	GF	GA	GD	Pts	TOR	VIC	DIA
1	Atlético Torino	4	4	0	0	8	1	+7	12		2–1	1–0
2	Deportivo Municipal (Vice)	4	2	0	2	9	6	+3	6	0–3		5–1
3	Diablos Rojos (Sullana)	4	0	0	4	1	11	−10	0	0–2	0–3	

Updated to match(es) played on unknown. Source: Liga Departamental de Piura
Legend: Blue = home team win; Yellow = draw; Red = away team win.

==== Group C ====
Pos	Team	Pld	W	D	L	GF	GA	GD	Pts	EST	LOM	GRA
1	Estudiantes FC	4	3	1	0	7	3	+4	10		2–1	3–2
2	Sport Loma Negra	4	2	1	1	8	3	+5	7	0–0		4–1
3	Atlético Grau (Paita)	4	0	0	4	3	12	−9	0	0–2	0–3	

Updated to match(es) played on unknown. Source: Liga Departamental de Piura
Legend: Blue = home team win; Yellow = draw; Red = away team win.

==== Group D ====
Pos	Team	Pld	W	D	L	GF	GA	GD	Pts	RCA	ERO	TIG
1	Ramón Castilla	2	0	1	1	2	4	−2	1		1–1	
2	Estrella Roja	0	0	0	0	0	0	0	0	3–1		
3	Los Tigres de Ayabaca	0	0	0	0	0	0	0	0			

Updated to match(es) played on unknown. Source: Liga Departamental de Piura
Legend: Blue = home team win; Yellow = draw; Red = away team win.

==== Group E ====
Pos	Team	Pld	W	D	L	GF	GA	GD	Pts	FEB	CAY	REA
1	5 de Febrero	4	2	1	1	6	4	+2	7		2–1	3–4
2	Deportivo Caysa Yapatera	4	2	0	2	8	4	+4	6	1–0		5–0
3	Real FC	4	1	1	2	4	10	−6	4	1–1	2–1	

Updated to match(es) played on unknown. Source: Liga Departamental de Piura
Legend: Blue = home team win; Yellow = draw; Red = away team win.

==== Group F ====
Pos	Team	Pld	W	D	L	GF	GA	GD	Pts	JAP	AGS	TOR
1	Juan Aurich Pedregal	4	3	1	0	3	2	+1	10		0–0	4–2
2	Águila Santa Rosa	4	2	1	1	4	2	+2	7	0–3		1–0
3	Asociación Torino	4	0	0	4	4	11	−7	0	0–3	2–3	

Updated to match(es) played on unknown. Source: Liga Departamental de Piura
Legend: Blue = home team win; Yellow = draw; Red = away team win.

==== Group G ====
Pos	Team	Pld	W	D	L	GF	GA	GD	Pts	ALF	CHO	CIC
1	Alfonso Ugarte (Vice)	4	1	2	1	2	1	+1	5		0–0	2–0
2	Sport Chorillos	4	1	2	1	2	2	0	5	1–0		0–0
3	Ciclón del Alto	4	1	2	1	2	3	−1	5	0–0	2–1	

Updated to match(es) played on unknown. Source: Liga Departamental de Piura
Legend: Blue = home team win; Yellow = draw; Red = away team win.

==== Group H ====
Pos	Team	Pld	W	D	L	GF	GA	GD	Pts	SMO	MAR	BOL
1	San Martín Occidente	4	2	2	0	10	3	+7	8		1–1	5–1
2	Deportivo Marcavelica	4	1	3	0	5	2	+3	6	1–1		0–0
3	Francisco Bolognesi	4	0	1	3	1	11	−10	1	0–3	0–3	

Updated to match(es) played on unknown. Source: Liga Departamental de Piura
Legend: Blue = home team win; Yellow = draw; Red = away team win.

=== Second stage ===
Team 1	Agg.	Team 2	1st leg	2nd leg
Jibaja Che	3–3 (3–4 p)	Defensor Marcavelica	2–0	1–3
Atlético Torino	2–2 (7–6 p)	Deportivo Caysa Yapatera	1–0	1–2
Estudiantes FC	3–6	Águila Santa Rosa	0–3	3–3
Ramón Castilla	2–3	Sport Loma Negra	2–0	0–3
5 de Febrero	1–2	San Martín Occidente	1–1	0–1
Juan Aurich Pedregal	2–4	Alfonso Ugarte (Vice)	0–3	2–1

=== Quarterfinals ===
Team 1	Agg.	Team 2	1st leg	2nd leg
Defensor Marcavelica	2–3	Deportivo Caysa Yapatera	2–0	0–3
Águila Santa Rosa	3–7	San Martín Occidente	2–3	1–4
Atlético Torino	7–1	Jibaja Che	4–0	3–1
Sport Loma Negra	2–2 (3–4 p)	Alfonso Ugarte (Vice)	1–0	1–2

=== Semifinals ===
Team 1	Agg.	Team 2	1st leg	2nd leg
Alfonso Ugarte (Vice)	2–3	Atlético Torino	2–1	0–2
Deportivo Caysa Yapatera	1–1 (4–2 p)	San Martín Occidente	1–1	0–0

=== Final ===
Team 1	Score	Team 2
Atlético Torino	3–0	Deportivo Caysa Yapatera

== Liga Departamental de Puno ==
=== First stage ===
==== Serie A ====
Pos	Team	Pld	W	D	L	GF	GA	GD	Pts	MOR	SJL	SAG	UFM
1	Deportivo Municipal (Orurillo)	6	4	2	0	14	2	+12	14		0–0	2–1	7–0
2	San José de Llungo	6	4	1	1	11	4	+7	13	1–2		3–0	3–1
3	Sport Águila	6	1	2	3	2	7	−5	5	1–1	0–2		1–0
4	Unión Fuerza Minera	6	0	1	5	2	16	−14	1	0–3	1–2	0–0	

Updated to match(es) played on unknown. Source: Liga Departamental de Puno
Legend: Blue = home team win; Yellow = draw; Red = away team win.

==== Serie B ====
Pos	Team	Pld	W	D	L	GF	GA	GD	Pts	CEF	MAY	MAC	CPZ
1	CEFUT Juliaca	6	5	1	0	24	3	+21	16		6–0	2–1	10–0
2	Deportivo Municipal (Aymaña)	6	2	3	1	7	10	−3	9	1–1		0–0	3–1
3	FC Macarí	6	2	1	3	10	9	+1	7	1–2	1–2		4–3
4	Panamericana F.C. Zepita	6	0	1	5	5	24	−19	1	0–3	1–1	0–3	

Updated to match(es) played on unknown. Source: Liga Departamental de Puno
Legend: Blue = home team win; Yellow = draw; Red = away team win.

==== Serie C ====
Pos	Team	Pld	W	D	L	GF	GA	GD	Pts	UCO	CSR	JGA	PTA
1	Unión Cocaci	6	6	0	0	17	5	+12	18		1–0	2–1	6–1
2	Credicoop San Román	6	4	0	2	18	8	+10	12	1–2		4–2	6–0
3	José Gálvez (El Collao)	6	2	0	4	11	14	−3	6	1–2	1–3		2–1
4	Pucará Túpac Amaru	6	0	0	6	7	26	−19	0	1–4	2–4	2–4	

Updated to match(es) played on unknown. Source: Liga Departamental de Puno
Legend: Blue = home team win; Yellow = draw; Red = away team win.

==== Serie D ====
Pos	Team	Pld	W	D	L	GF	GA	GD	Pts	DAS	LEO	MAJ	TRS
1	Dinamos de Asillo	6	5	1	0	13	3	+10	16		2–1	1–0	4–0
2	Leones de Anccaca	6	4	1	1	19	4	+15	13	1–1		6–0	5–0
3	Deportivo Municipal (Ajoyani)	6	2	0	4	10	14	−4	6	1–2	1–3		5–1
4	Transportistas Sandinos	6	0	0	6	2	23	−21	0	0–3	0–3	1–3	

Updated to match(es) played on unknown. Source: Liga Departamental de Puno
Legend: Blue = home team win; Yellow = draw; Red = away team win.

==== Serie E ====
Pos	Team	Pld	W	D	L	GF	GA	GD	Pts	UAZ	MIN	EST	FLO
1	Universitario de Azángaro	6	5	1	0	13	3	+10	16		2–0	5–0	1–0
2	Atlético Miner	6	3	2	1	10	4	+6	11	0–0		1–1	1–0
3	Estudiantes IESPPEF	6	2	1	3	8	13	−5	7	1–2	1–3		1–0
4	Flores Talentos	6	0	0	6	4	15	−11	0	2–3	0–5	2–4	

Updated to match(es) played on unknown. Source: Liga Departamental de Puno
Legend: Blue = home team win; Yellow = draw; Red = away team win.

=== Second stage ===
Team 1	Agg.	Team 2	1st leg	2nd leg
Deprotivo Municipal (Orurillo)	8–1	Estudiantes IESPPEF	5–1	3–0
Atlético Miner	1–1	CEFUT Juliaca	0–0	1–1
Dinamos de Asillo	3–1	San José de LLungo	2–1	1–0
FC Macarí	5–6	Unión Cocaci	3–1	2–5
Deportivo Municipal (Aymaña)	5–6	Universitario de Azángaro	3–1	2–5
Leones de Anccaca	6–2	Credicoop San Román	3–1	3–1

=== Third stage ===
==== Group A ====
Pos	Team	Pld	W	D	L	GF	GA	GD	Pts	CEF	MUN	DIN
1	CEFUT Juliaca	3	2	0	1	8	1	+7	6		2–0	3–0
2	Deportivo Municipal (Orurillo)	4	2	1	1	8	3	+5	7	1–0		7–1
3	Dinamos de Asillo	3	0	1	2	1	13	−12	1	0–3	0–0	

Updated to match(es) played on unknown. Source: Liga Departamental de Puno
Legend: Blue = home team win; Yellow = draw; Red = away team win.

==== Group B ====
Pos	Team	Pld	W	D	L	GF	GA	GD	Pts	LEO	UCO	UAZ
1	Leones de Anccaca	4	3	0	1	11	6	+5	9		3–1	3–1
2	Unión Cocaci	4	2	0	2	9	7	+2	6	2–0		3–0
3	Universitario de Azángaro	4	1	0	3	7	14	−7	3	2–5	4–3	

Updated to match(es) played on unknown. Source: Liga Departamental de Puno
Legend: Blue = home team win; Yellow = draw; Red = away team win.

=== Final ===
Team 1	Score	Team 2
CEFUT Juliaca	1–2	Leones de Anccaca

== Liga Departamental de San Martín ==
=== First Stage ===
Team 1	Agg.	Team 2	1st leg	2nd leg
AC Alto Mayo	1–1	Atlético Awajun	1–1	0–0
Unión Pamashto	4–3	Estudiantes de Ingeniería	3–3	1–0
Deportivo Rivata	2–2	Shanao FC	1–1	1–1
Oriente Tarapoto	5–4	Unión Santa Marta	2–0	3–4
Sport Huaja	1–2	Unión Picota	1–0	0–2
AF Barcelona	4–5	Deportivo Oriente	2–1	2–4
Oriental Sporting	0–5	FC Carhuapoma	0–4	0–1
Defensor Víveres	2–4	Real Piscoyacu	1–3	1–1
Unión Cuzco	0–1	Defensor La Merced	0–0	0–1

=== Round of 16 ===
Team 1	Agg.	Team 2	1st leg	2nd leg
Estudiantes de Ingeniería	1–1 (2–3 p)	Real Piscoyacu	0–1	1–0
Unión Cuzco	0–4	FC Carhuapoma	0–1	0–3
Deportivo Rivata	5–6	Oriente Tarapoto	2–1	3–5
Atético Awajun	2–4	Unión Pamashto	2–1	0–3
Sport Huaja	1–0	Unión Picota	0–0	1–0
Shanao FC	5–2	Deportivo Oriente	3–2	2–0
AC Alto Mayo	1–3	Defensor La Merced	0–1	1–2
AF Barcelona	6–2	Unión Santa Marta	5–1	1–1

=== Quarterfinals ===
Team 1	Agg.	Team 2	1st leg	2nd leg
Oriente Tarapoto	4–0	FC Carhuapoma	4–0	0–0
Sport Huaja	3–1	Unión Pamashto	0–0	3–1
Shanao FC	4–1	Real Piscoyacu	1–0	3–1
AF Barcelona	4–6	Defensor La Merced	3–1	1–5

=== Semifinals ===
Team 1	Agg.	Team 2	1st leg	2nd leg
Sport Huaja	5–1	Oriente Tarapoto	2–0	3–1
Shanao FC	3–2	Defensor La Merced	1–1	2–1

=== Final ===
Team 1	Score	Team 2
Shanao FC	2–0	Sport Huaja

== Liga Departamental de Tacna ==
=== First Stage ===
Team 1	Agg.	Team 2	1st leg	2nd leg
Vendaval Azul	2–0	Dinamo de Solabaya	0–0	2–0
Deportivo Municipal (Locumba)	3–4	Social Santa Cruz	1–3	2–1
Unión Totora	1–9	Virgen de la Natividad	0–1	1–8

=== Final Group ===
Pos	Team	Pld	W	D	L	GF	GA	GD	Pts	Qualification or relegation	VEN	VIR	SAN	MUN
1	Vendaval Azul	3	2	1	0	8	3	+5	7	Advance to 2026 Copa Perú				5–1
2	Virgen de la Natividad	3	2	1	0	6	2	+4	7	Advance to 2026 Copa Perú	1–1			3–0
3	Social Santa Cruz	2	0	0	2	2	4	−2	0		1–2	1–2		
4	Deportivo Municipal (Locumba)	2	0	0	2	1	8	−7	0				n.p.	

Legend: Blue = home team win; Yellow = draw; Red = away team win.
Rules for classification: 1) Points; 2) Goal difference; 3) Goals for; 4) Fair play points; 5) Drawing of lots.

==== Tiebreaker ====
Team 1	Score	Team 2
Vendaval Azul	1–1 (2–4 p)	Virgen de la Natividad

== Liga Departamental de Tumbes ==
=== Group Stage ===
==== Group A ====
Pos	Team	Pld	W	D	L	GF	GA	GD	Pts	TAB	CHU	FER	GRA
1	Sport El Tablazo	3	2	1	0	11	4	+7	7		5–0		4–4
2	UD Chulucanas	3	1	1	1	3	7	−4	4				
3	Deportivo Ferrocarril	3	1	0	2	3	3	0	3	0–2	0–1		
4	Alianza Grau	3	0	2	1	6	9	−3	2		2–2	0–3	

Updated to match(es) played on unknown. Source: Liga Departamental de Tumbes
Legend: Blue = home team win; Yellow = draw; Red = away team win.

==== Group B ====
Pos	Team	Pld	W	D	L	GF	GA	GD	Pts	UNT	PAC	BOL	ACA
1	UNT	3	2	1	0	11	4	+7	7			4–2	6–1
2	Deportivo Pacífico	3	2	1	0	6	4	+2	7	1–1		3–2	
3	Sport Bolognesi	3	1	0	2	7	8	−1	3				3–1
4	Barcelona de Acapulco	3	0	0	3	3	11	−8	0		1–2		

Updated to match(es) played on unknown. Source: Liga Departamental de Tumbes
Legend: Blue = home team win; Yellow = draw; Red = away team win.

=== Final Group ===
Pos	Team	Pld	W	D	L	GF	GA	GD	Pts	Qualification or relegation	PAC	CHU	UNT	TAB
1	Deportivo Pacífico	3	3	0	0	8	1	+7	9	Advance to 2026 Copa Perú		2–1		
2	UD Chulucanas	3	2	0	1	6	3	+3	6	Advance to 2026 Copa Perú			2–1	
3	UNT	3	0	0	3	3	8	−5	0		0–3			2–3
4	Sport El Tablazo	3	1	0	2	3	8	−5	3	Disqualified	0–3	0–3		

Legend: Blue = home team win; Yellow = draw; Red = away team win.
Rules for classification: 1) Points; 2) Goal difference; 3) Goals for; 4) Fair play points; 5) Drawing of lots.

== Liga Departamental de Ucayali ==
=== First Stage ===
Team 1	Agg.	Team 2	1st leg	2nd leg
La Paz (Pachitea)	2–1	La Peña de los Viernes	1–1	1–0
Deportivo Bancos	3–3 (6–5 p)	Real Buenos Aires	1–0	2–3
Miguel Grau (Atalaya)	3–4	Cultural Dos de Mayo (Puerto Inca)	1–3	2–1
Deportivo Municipal (Atalaya)	9–2	Defensor Nuevo Satipo	3–2	6–0

=== Final Group ===
Pos	Team	Pld	W	D	L	GF	GA	GD	Pts	Qualification or relegation	BAN	MUN	DOS	PAZ
1	Deportivo Bancos	3	3	0	0	5	0	+5	9	Advance to 2026 Copa Perú		2–0	1–0	
2	Deportivo Municipal (Atalaya)	3	2	0	1	4	4	0	6	Advance to 2026 Copa Perú				3–2
3	Cultural Dos de Mayo (Puerto Inca)	3	1	0	2	2	3	−1	3			0–1		2–1
4	La Paz (Pachitea)	3	0	0	3	3	7	−4	0		0–2			

Legend: Blue = home team win; Yellow = draw; Red = away team win.
Rules for classification: 1) Points; 2) Goal difference; 3) Goals for; 4) Fair play points; 5) Drawing of lots.

== See also ==
- 2026 Liga 1
- 2026 Liga 2
- 2026 Liga 3
- 2026 Copa Perú
