= 1976 Copa Perú =

Copa Perú
- Season: 1976
- Champions: Coronel Bolognesi
- Top goalscorer: Jaime Valdivia (9)

The 1976 Copa Perú season (Spanish: Copa Perú 1976), the promotion tournament of Peruvian football.

In this tournament, after many qualification rounds, each one of the 24 departments in which Peru is politically divided qualified a team. Those teams, plus the team relegated from First Division on the last year, enter in two more rounds and finally 6 of them qualify for the Final round, staged in Lima (the capital).

The champion was promoted to 1977 Torneo Descentralizado.

== Finalists teams ==
The following list shows the teams that qualified for the Final Stage.

Department	Team	Location
Ancash	Sport Ancash	Huaraz
Apurímac	Miguel Grau	Abancay
Arequipa	Pesca Perú	Mollendo
Huánuco	Santa Rosa Junior	Huánuco
Lambayeque	Boca Juniors	Ferreñafe
Tacna	Coronel Bolognesi	Tacna

== Provincial Stage ==
=== Semifinals ===
Team 1	Score	Team 2
Universidad Federico Villareal	3–0	Juventud Lurín
Barcelona (Surquillo)	2–3	Bata Sol

== Final Stage ==
=== Standings ===
Pos	Team	Pld	W	D	L	GF	GA	GD	Pts	Promotion
1	Coronel Bolognesi (C)	5	3	1	1	10	7	+3	7	1977 Torneo Descentralizado
2	Pesca Perú	5	3	0	2	13	7	+6	6	
3	Sport Áncash	5	2	1	2	6	7	−1	5	
4	Boca Juniors	5	2	0	3	9	9	0	4	
5	Miguel Grau	5	1	2	2	3	7	−4	4	
6	Santa Rosa Junior	5	2	0	3	3	7	−4	4	

(C) Champions

=== Round 1 ===
26 September 1976	Santa Rosa Junior	1–0	Coronel Bolognesi	Nacional, Lima

26 September 1976	Pesca Perú	4–2	Sport Áncash	Nacional, Lima

26 September 1976	Boca Juniors	1–0	Miguel Grau	Nacional, Lima

=== Round 2 ===
29 September 1976	Coronel Bolognesi	3–2	Pesca Perú	Nacional, Lima

29 September 1976	Miguel Grau	1–0	Santa Rosa Junior	Nacional, Lima

29 September 1976	Sport Áncash	2–1	Boca Juniors	Nacional, Lima

=== Round 3 ===
3 October 1976	Pesca Perú	3–1	Boca Juniors	Nacional, Lima

3 October 1976	Coronel Bolognesi	2–2	Miguel Grau	Nacional, Lima

3 October 1976	Sport Áncash	2–0	Santa Rosa Junior	Nacional, Lima

=== Round 4 ===
6 October 1976	Santa Rosa Junior	1–0	Pesca Perú	Nacional, Lima

6 October 1976	Sport Áncash	0–0	Miguel Grau	Nacional, Lima

6 October 1976	Coronel Bolognesi	3–2	Boca Juniors	Nacional, Lima

=== Round 5 ===
10 October 1976	Boca Juniors	4–1	Santa Rosa Junior	Nacional, Lima

10 October 1976	Pesca Perú	4–0	Miguel Grau	Nacional, Lima

10 October 1976	Coronel Bolognesi	2–0	Sport Áncash	Nacional, Lima
