= José Bilibio =

Armenian footballer (born 1975)

Personal information
- Full name: José Andrés Bilibio Estigarribia
- Date of birth: 2 January 1975 (age 51)
- Place of birth: Corrientes, Argentina
- Position: Defender

Youth career
- Deportivo Armenio

Senior career*
Years	Team	Apps	(Gls)
1997–1998	Deportivo Armenio	total 62	(5)
1999	Ararat Yerevan	14	(3)
1999–2000	Deportivo Armenio	(see above)	
2000–2001	Los Andes	2	(0)
2001–2002	Deportivo Armenio	(see above)	
2002–2003	Pyunik Yerevan	45	(3)
2005	Club Bolívar	0	(0)
2005–2006	Espoli	25	(1)
2006	Tiro Federal	8	(0)
2007	Coronel Bolognesi	18	(1)
2007	Manta FC		
2008	Coronel Bolognesi		
2009–2010	CF Vilanova		
2010–2011	Deportivo Armenio		

International career
2002–2003	Armenia	10	(0)
- * Club domestic league appearances and goals

José Andrés Bilibio Estigarribia (Armenian: Խոսե Անդրե Բիլիբիո Էստիգարրիբիա, born 2 January 1975) is a former professional footballer who played as a defender. Born in Argentina, he represented the Armenia national team at international level.

== International career ==
Born and raised in Argentina, Bilibio has dual nationality with Armenia. He was a member of the Armenia national team and played ten international matches between 2002 and 2003.

== Career statistics ==
Appearances and goals by national team and year
National team	Year	Apps	Goals
Armenia	2002	3	0
Armenia	2003	7	0
Total		10!	0
