= Miguel Ostersen =

Mexican footballer (born 1980)

Personal information
- Full name: Miguel Pedro Ostersen Hernández
- Date of birth: 11 January 1980 (age 46)
- Place of birth: Mexico City, Mexico
- Height: 1.81 m (5 ft 11 in)
- Position: Midfielder

Senior career*
Years	Team	Apps	(Gls)
2000–2002	Correcaminos UAT	9	(0)
2002–2003	Necaxa	7	(0)
2004–2007	Alacranes de Durango	87	(0)
2007–2008	Coronel Bolognesi	35	(1)
2008–2009	Puebla	2	(0)
2009–2010	Coronel Bolognesi	?	(?)
- * Club domestic league appearances and goals

Miguel Pedro Ostersen Hernández (born 11 January 1980) is a Mexican former footballer. He is from Danish and native Mexican descent.
