= Coronel Bolognesi =

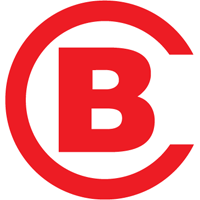
- Full name: Club Deportivo Coronel Bolognesi
- Nicknames: Bolo, Bólido del Sur, Los Diablos Rojos, Los Escarlatas, El Coronel
- Founded: October 18, 1929; 96 years ago
- Ground: Estadio Jorge Basadre, Tacna
- Capacity: 19,000
- Chairman: (Peru) Ing. Oscar Ayala Estrada
- Manager: (Peru) Juan Carlos Nieto
- League: Copa Perú
- 2019: Eliminated in Round of 32
Home colours	Away colours

Club Deportivo Coronel Bolognesi is a Peruvian football club located in the city of Tacna. Originally founded on 18 October 1929, It was named after Francisco Bolognesi. Years later, a second branch of the club called Club Sport Bolito, was founded on 27 May 1998.

The club quickly surpassed its older counterpart's achievements and, following its success in 2001 Copa Perú, the president's club Elena Martorell (Fernando Martorell's sister, then president of CD Coronel Bolognesi), decided to change the club's name to Coronel Bolognesi Fútbol Club, in order to further identify both clubs's identities and share their successes. The identity confusion escalated since Coronel Bolognesi FC's international performances in the 2000s and 2010s, and hence generated much controversy about whether they're the same club or not.

== Rivalries ==
Coronel Bolognesi has had a long-standing rivalry with Alfonso Ugarte (Tacna) and Mariscal Miller.

== Stadium ==
Coronel Bolognesi play their home games at the Estadio Jorge Basadre, located in the city of Tacna.

== Historic Badges ==
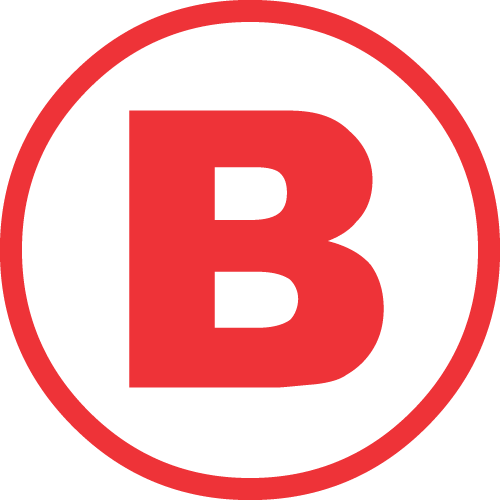

== Notable players ==
Peruvian players

- (Peru) Gerardo Baigorria
- (Peru) Germán Carty
- (Peru) Juan Cominges
- (Peru) Paul Cominges
- (Peru) Johan Fano
- (Peru) Miguel Mostto
- (Peru) Diego Penny
- (Peru) Luis Ramírez
- (Peru) Junior Ross
- (Peru) Johan Vásquez
- (Peru) David Soria Yoshinari

Foreign players

- (Argentina) Federico Martorell
- (Armenia) (Argentina) José Andrés Bilibio
- (Japan) Masakatsu Sawa
- (Mexico) Miguel Ostersen

== Honours ==
=== Senior titles ===
Keys

- Record
- ^{(s)} Shared record

Type	Competition	Titles	Runner-up	Winning years	Runner-up years
National (League)	Primera División	—	1	—	2007
National (League)	Copa Perú	2	2	1976, 2001	1998, 2000
Half-year / Short tournament (League)	Torneo Clausura	1	—	2007	—
Half-year / Short tournament (League)	Torneo Interzonal	1	1	1977 Grupo B	1978
Half-year / Short tournament (League)	Torneo Zona Sur	2	—	1985, 1987	—
Regional (League)	Región VI	1	—	1996	—
Regional (League)	Región VIII	4	—	1998, 1999, 2000, 2001	—
Regional (League)	Liga Departamental de Tacna	20	2	1966, 1967, 1970, 1971, 1972, 1973, 1974, 1994, 1995, 1996, 1997, 1998, 1999, 2000, 2001, 2013, 2015, 2016, 2017, 2019	2004, 2022
Regional (League)	Liga Provincial de Tacna	5	3	2008, 2013, 2015, 2016, 2017	2014, 2019, 2022
Regional (League)	Liga Distrital del Tacna	11	5	1961, 1966, 1967, 1970, 1973, 1974, 2012, 2013, 2014, 2017, 2019, 2022	1962, 2007, 2008, 2011, 2015

== Performance in CONMEBOL competitions ==
- Copa Libertadores: 1 appearance

2008: First Round

- Copa Sudamericana: 3 appearances

2004: Preliminary Round
2006: First Round
2007: First Round
