= Miguel Grau de Abancay =

Miguel Grau
- Full name: Club Deportivo Miguel Grau
- Founded: 1955
- Ground: Monumental de Condebamba, Abancay
- Capacity: 10,000
- League: Copa Perú
- 2021: Eliminated in the Regional Phase
Home colours

Miguel Grau is a Peruvian football club based in the city of Abancay, Apurímac, Peru.

The club is the biggest of Abancay city, and one of the biggest in the Apurímac Province.

The club was founded in 1955 and plays in the Copa Perú, which is the third division of the Peruvian league.

== History ==
The club was founded with the name of Club Deportivo Miguel Grau in honor of the Peruvian naval officer Miguel Grau. The club adopted the name of Club Unión Grauína Abancay until 2004.

-2004 crest

In the 1976 Copa Perú, the club qualified to the National Stage, but was eliminated.

In the 1980 Copa Perú, the club qualified to the National Stage, but was eliminated.

In the 1998 Copa Perú, the club qualified to the National Stage as Unión Grauína, but was eliminated by Coronel Bolognesi.

In the 2004 Copa Perú, the club qualified to the National Stage as Unión Grauína, but was eliminated by Senati FBC.

== Rivalries ==
Miguel Grau has had a long-standing rivalry with Deportivo Educación.

== Honours ==
=== Regional ===
- Región VI:

Winners (1): 1998

- Región VIII:

Runner-up (1): 2004

- Liga Departamental de Apurimac:

Winners (13): 1967, 1970, 1972, 1973, 1978, 1979, 1987, 1989, 1998, 2014, 2019, 2023, 2024
Runner-up (3): 2004, 2017, 2026

- Liga Provincial de Abancay:

Winners (6): 2007, 2010, 2011, 2014, 2016, 2019
Runner-up (5): 2015, 2017, 2023, 2024, 2026

- Liga Distrital de Abancay:

Winners (13): 1967, 1970, 1972, 1976, 1978, 1987, 1998, 2007, 2010, 2014, 2023, 2025, 2026
Runner-up (5): 2011, 2015, 2016, 2017, 2019

== See also ==
- List of football clubs in Peru
- Peruvian football league system
