= Big Three (Peru) =

Nickname of the three biggest football clubs in Peru

- Alianza Lima Sporting Cristal
- Location: Lima
- Teams: Alianza Lima; Sporting Cristal; Universitario de Deportes
- Stadiums: Alejandro Villanueva (Alianza Lima); Alberto Gallardo (Sporting Cristal)

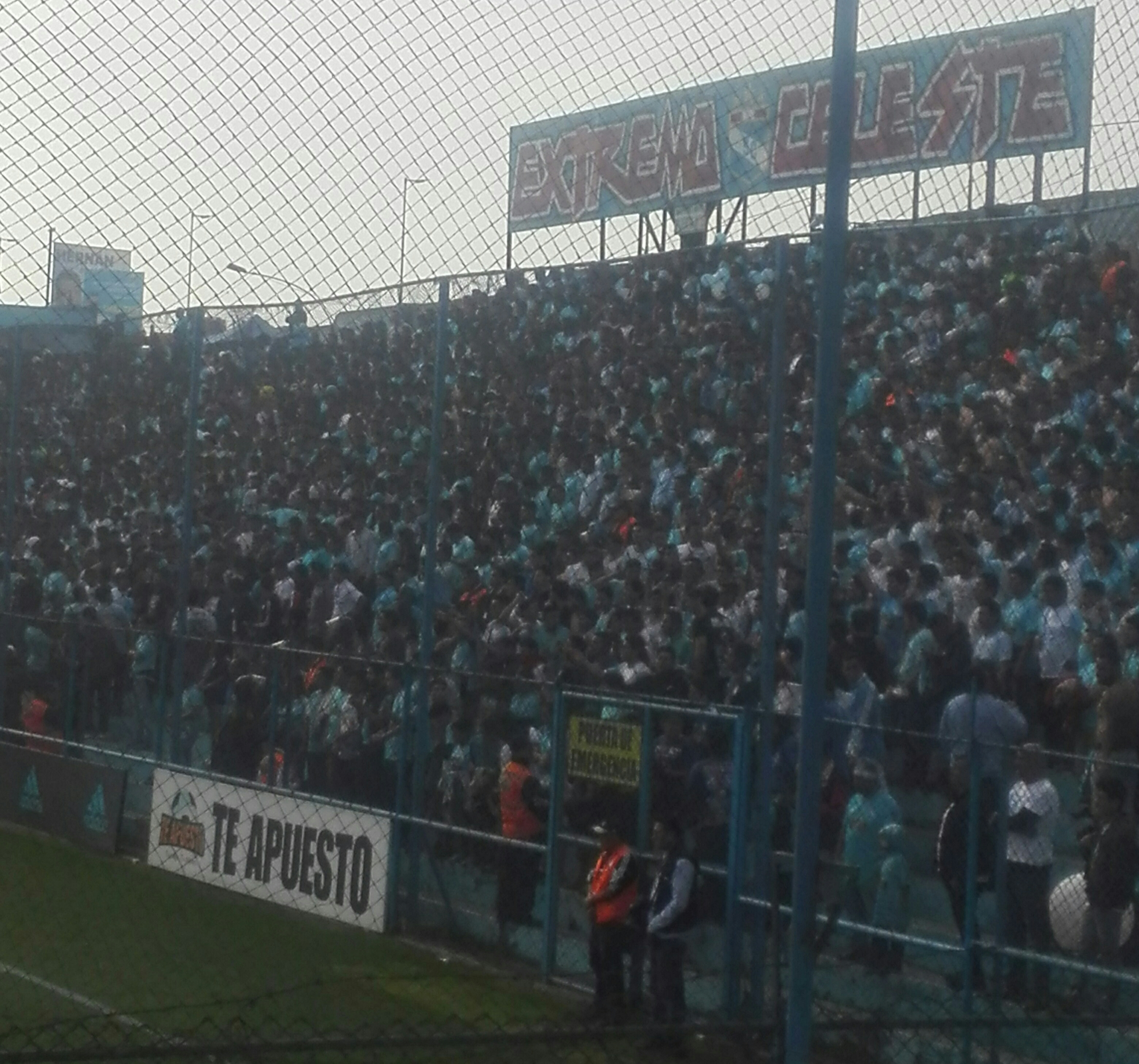
Sporting Cristal, Alberto Gallardo

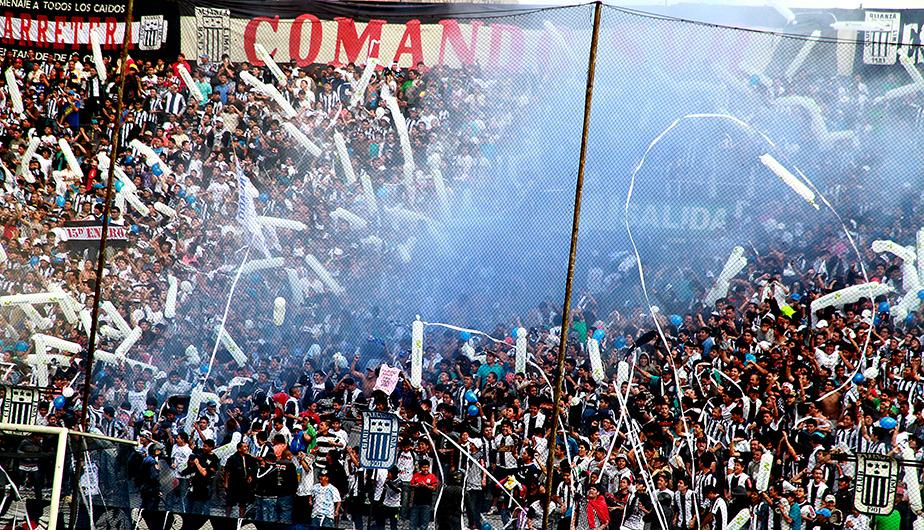
Alianza Lima, Alejandro Villanueva

The Big Three (Spanish: Los Tres Grandes) is the nickname of the three most successful sports clubs in Peru. The football teams of Alianza Lima, Sporting Cristal, and Universitario de Deportes have historical rivalries and usually are the main contenders for the title.

Location of the three clubs in Lima. Universitario is located further east.

Several other clubs outside the big three have won the Peruvian league, with Sport Boys having the fourth most national titles behind the Big Three in Peru with 6 in total. In recent years, the chief competitors of the three are Melgar, Cienciano and Cusco.

== Titles by club ==
Club	Total	Liga de Lima (1912–21)	Amateur era Lima & Callao (1926–50)	Professional era (1951–)		
Club	Total	Liga de Lima (1912–21)	Amateur era Lima & Callao (1926–50)	Lima & Callao (1951–65)	Descentralizado (1966–2018)	Liga 1 (2019–)
Universitario de Deportes^{[C]}	29	—	7	3	16	3
Alianza Lima^{[D]}	25	2	6	6	9	2
Sporting Cristal^{[E]}	20	—	—	2	17	1

Club	Winners	Runners-up	Winning years	Runners-up years
Universitario de Deportes	29	15	1929, 1934, 1939, 1941, 1945, 1946, 1949, 1959, 1960, 1964, 1966, 1967, 1969, 1971, 1974, 1982, 1985, 1987, 1990, 1992, 1993, 1998, 1999, 2000, 2009, 2013, 2023, 2024, 2025	1928, 1932, 1933, 1940, 1955, 1965, 1970, 1972, 1978, 1984, 1988, 1995, 2002, 2008, 2020
Alianza Lima	25	25	1918, 1919, 1927, 1928, 1931, 1932, 1933, 1948, 1952, 1954, 1955, 1962, 1963, 1965, 1975, 1977, 1978, 1997, 2001, 2003, 2004, 2006, 2017, 2021, 2022	1914, 1917, 1926, 1930, 1934, 1935, 1937, 1943, 1953, 1956, 1961, 1964, 1971, 1982, 1986, 1987, 1993, 1994, 1996, 1999, 2009, 2011, 2018, 2019, 2023
Sporting Cristal	20	15	1956, 1961, 1968, 1970, 1972, 1979, 1980, 1983, 1988, 1991, 1994, 1995, 1996, 2002, 2005, 2012, 2014, 2016, 2018, 2020	1962, 1963, 1967, 1973, 1977, 1989, 1992, 1997, 1998, 2000, 2003, 2004, 2015, 2021, 2024

== Title definitions ==
=== List of finals ===
Year	Winner	Score	Runner-up	Venue		
1987	Universitario de Deportes	1–0	Alianza Lima	Estadio Nacional		
1988	Sporting Cristal	2–1	Universitario de Deportes	Estadio Nacional		
Year	Winner	Agg.	Runner-up	1st leg	2nd leg	3rd leg
1998	Universitario de Deportes	3–3 (penalty shootout 4–2)	Sporting Cristal	1–2	2–1	–
1999	Universitario de Deportes	3–1	Alianza Lima	3–0	0–1	–
2003	Alianza Lima	2–1^{†}	Sporting Cristal	Single match		
2004	Alianza Lima	0–0 (penalty shootout 5–4)	Sporting Cristal	Single match		
2009	Universitario de Deportes	2–0	Alianza Lima	1–0	1–0	–
2018	Sporting Cristal	7–1	Alianza Lima	4–1	3–0	–
2020	Sporting Cristal	3–2	Universitario de Deportes	2–1	1–1	–
2021	Alianza Lima	1–0	Sporting Cristal	1–0	0–0	–
2023	Universitario de Deportes	3–1	Alianza Lima	1–1	2–0	–

=== Other definitions ===
These matches were played when teams were tied for first in the general league or in a specific tournament.

Year	Winner	Score	Runner-up	Venue	In contention
1928	Alianza Lima	1–1	Federación Universitaria	Stadium Nacional	1928 Campeonato de Selección y Competencia
Replay	Alianza Lima	2–0	Federación Universitaria	Stadium Nacional	1928 Campeonato de Selección y Competencia
1935	Universitario de Deportes	2–1	Alianza Lima	Stadium Nacional	1934 Torneo de Primeros Equipos
1955	Alianza Lima	2–1	Universitario de Deportes	Estadio Nacional	1955 Campeonato Profesional de Lima
1961	Sporting Cristal	2–0	Alianza Lima	Estadio Nacional	1961 Campeonato Profesional de Lima
1990	Universitario de Deportes	1–0	Alianza Lima	Estadio Nacional	1990 Torneo Regional II
1991	Sporting Cristal	1–1 (penalty shootout 7–6)	Universitario de Deportes	Estadio Nacional	1991 Torneo Regional II
1998	Sporting Cristal	1–0	Alianza Lima	Estadio Nacional	1998 Torneo Clausura
2001	Alianza Lima	2–1	Sporting Cristal	Estadio Nacional	2001 Torneo Apertura
2002	Universitario de Deportes	1–0; 0–0	Alianza Lima	Estadio Monumental; Estadio Mansiche	2002 Torneo Apertura
2014	Sporting Cristal	1–0	Alianza Lima	Estadio UNSA	2014 Torneo Clausura

== Half-year / Short tournaments ==
=== Torneo Apertura / Fase 1 seasons ===
Club	Winners	Runners-up	Winning years	Runners-up years
Universitario de Deportes	9	2	1998, 1999, 2000, 2002, 2008, 2016, 2020, 2024, 2025	1969, 2005
Alianza Lima	7	5	1997, 2001, 2004, 2006, 2017, 2023, 2026	1999, 2002, 2003, 2018, 2025
Sporting Cristal	4	8	2003, 2015, 2018, 2021	1997, 2001, 2006, 2008, 2016, 2019, 2023, 2024

=== Torneo Clausura / Fase 2 seasons ===
Club	Winners	Runners-up	Winning years	Runners-up years
Alianza Lima	7	5	1997, 1999, 2003, 2017, 2019, 2021, 2022	1998, 2002, 2014, 2018, 2024
Sporting Cristal	6	6	1998, 2002, 2004, 2005, 2014, 2016	2000, 2008, 2020, 2021, 2022, 2026
Universitario de Deportes	4	6	2000, 2023, 2024, 2025	1997, 1999, 2006, 2007, 2016, 2019

=== Torneo Regional seasons (1984–1991) ===
Club	Winners	Runners-up	Winning years	Runners-up years
Universitario de Deportes	4	3	1985, 1987, 1988, 1990–II	1989–II, 1990–I, 1991–I
Sporting Cristal	3	0	1989–I, 1991–I, 1991–II	—
Alianza Lima	0	2	—	1986, 1990–II

=== Torneo Descentralizado seasons (1984–1988) ===
Club	Winners	Runners-up	Winning years	Runners-up years
Alianza Lima	2	0	1986, 1987	—
Universitario de Deportes	1	1	1985	1988
Sporting Cristal	1	0	1988	—

=== Torneo Zona Metropolitana seasons (1984–1991) ===
Club	Winners	Runners-up	Winning years	Runners-up years
Universitario de Deportes	6	0	1984, 1987, 1988 Grupo A, 1989–II, 1990–I, 1991–II	—
Alianza Lima	3	3	1985, 1989–I, 1990–II	1984, 1986, 1990–I
Sporting Cristal	2	2	1986, 1991–I	1989–I, 1989–II

=== Parallel tournaments ===
Club	Winners	Runners-up	Winning years	Runners-up years
Sporting Cristal	4	1	1992 Liguilla Pre-Libertadores, 1994 Apertura, 1997 Liguilla Pre-Libertadores, 2018 Torneo de Verano	1993 Liguilla Pre-Libertadores
Alianza Lima	3	0	1993 Liguilla Pre-Libertadores, 1994 Liguilla Pre-Libertadores, 1996 Liguilla Pre-Libertadores	—
Universitario de Deportes	0	5	—	1969 Apertura, 1981 Regional, 1989 Torneo Plácido Galindo, 1996 Liguilla Pre-Libertadores, 1997 Liguilla Pre-Libertadores

=== Total Half-year / Short tournaments by club ===
Club	Total	Half-year tournaments							
Club	Total	Torneo Apertura (1997–)	Torneo Clausura (1997–)	Torneo Regional (1984–1991)	Torneo Descentralizado (1984–1988)	Torneo Zona Metropolitana (1984–1991)	Torneo de Verano (2017–2018)	Liguilla Pre-Libertadores (1992–1997)	Apertura (1994)
Universitario de Deportes	24	9	4	4	1	6	0	0	0
Alianza Lima	22	7	7	0	2	3	0	3	0
Sporting Cristal	20	4	6	3	1	2	1	2	1

== National Cups and Supercups ==
Club	Winners	Runners-up	Winning years	Runners-up years
Alianza Lima	4	1	1919 Copa de Campeones del Perú, 1928 Torneo Interligas, 2014 Torneo del Inca, 2018 Supercopa Movistar	2015 Torneo del Inca
Universitario de Deportes	1	0	1970 Copa Presidente de la República	—
Sporting Cristal	1	0	2021 Copa Bicentenario	—

== Total International Participations by club ==
As of 8 september 2026

Club	Total	International Participations						
Club	Total	Copa Libertadores (1961–)	Copa Sudamericana (2003–)	Recopa Sudamericana (1970–)	Copa CONMEBOL (1992–1999)	Copa Merconorte (1998–2001)	Copa de Campeones (1948)	Copa Ganadores de Copa (1970–1971)
Sporting Cristal	51	41	5	0	1	4	—	—
Universitario de Deportes	50	36	8	0	2	4	—	—
Alianza Lima	42	32	5	0	1	4	—	—

=== Performances by club ===
Performance in international cups by club
Team	Winners	Runners-up	Years won	Years lost
Universitario de Deportes	0	1	—	1972
Sporting Cristal	0	1	—	1997

== See also ==
- Big Three (Belgium)
- Big Three (Costa Rica)
- Big Three (Greece)
- Big Three (Italy)
- Big Three (Netherlands)
- Big Three (Portugal)
- Big Three (Spain)
- Big Three (Sweden)
- Big Three (Turkey)
- Big Four (Mexico)
- Big Five (Argentina)
- Big Six (Premier League)
- Big Twelve (Brazil)
