= 1964 Peruvian Primera División =

Peruvian Primera División
- Season: 1964
- Dates: 1 August 1964 – 3 January 1965
- Champions: Universitario (10th title)
- Runner up: Alianza Lima
- Relegated: KDT Nacional
- 1965 Copa Libertadores: Universitario
- Matches: 110
- Goals: 302 (2.75 per match)
- Top goalscorer: Ángel Uribe (15 goals)

The 1964 season of the Peruvian Primera División, the top category of Peruvian football, was played by 10 teams. The national champions were Universitario.

For the current season, the club Defensor Lima adopted the name Defensor Breña.

== Competition format ==
At the end of the regular season (home and away matches) teams were split in 2 groups of 5 teams: top 5 played for the title and bottom 5 played for the relegation. Teams carried their regular season records and played an additional round (4 further matches).

Two points were awarded for a win, one point for a draw, and no points for a loss.

== Teams ==
=== Team changes ===
Promoted from 1963 Segunda División	Relegated from 1963 Primera División
▲ Carlos Concha (1st)	▼ Mariscal Sucre (10th)

=== Stadia locations ===
Team	City	Mannager
Alianza Lima	La Victoria, Lima	(Brazil) Jaime de Almeida
Carlos Concha	Callao	(Peru) Agapito Perales
Centro Iqueño	Cercado de Lima	(Paraguay) César López Fretes
Ciclista Lima	Cercado de Lima	(Peru) José Chiarella
Defensor Breña	Breña, Lima	(Argentina) Filpo Núñez
Deportivo Municipal	Cercado de Lima	(Peru) Juan Honores
KDT Nacional	Callao	(Peru) César Brush
Sport Boys	Callao	(Brazil) José Gomes Nogueira
Sporting Cristal	Rímac, Lima	(Peru) Alberto Terry
Universitario	Breña, Lima	(Peru) Marcos Calderón

== First Stage ==
=== Standings ===
Pos	Team	Pld	W	D	L	GF	GA	GD	Pts	Qualification or relegation
1	Universitario	18	14	1	3	43	17	+26	29	Liguilla Final
2	Sporting Cristal	18	10	4	4	31	18	+13	24	Liguilla Final
3	Alianza Lima	18	10	3	5	33	15	+18	23	Liguilla Final
4	Deportivo Municipal	18	11	1	6	32	22	+10	23	Liguilla Final
5	Sport Boys	18	9	3	6	30	14	+16	21	Liguilla Final
6	Centro Iqueño	18	8	5	5	21	20	+1	21	Liguilla Descenso
7	Defensor Breña	18	4	5	9	20	29	−9	13	Liguilla Descenso
8	Ciclista Lima	18	4	4	10	21	35	−14	12	Liguilla Descenso
9	Carlos Concha	18	3	2	13	15	45	−30	8	Liguilla Descenso
10	KDT Nacional	18	1	4	13	7	38	−31	6	Liguilla Descenso

=== Results ===
Home \ Away	ALI	CAR	IQU	CIC	DLI	MUN	KDT	SBA	CRI	UNI
Alianza Lima		6–1	2–3	5–0	2–3	2–0	5–0	1–1	2–0	0–3
Carlos Concha	0–2		1–2	2–1	3–0	2–3	2–1	0–6	0–2	0–3
Centro Iqueño	0–0	2–0		2–1	3–2	1–1	1–0	1–0	0–3	0–2
Ciclista Lima	1–2	3–1	2–0		1–1	4–2	2–0	1–2	1–2	1–5
Defensor Breña	0–0	3–1	0–0	1–1		1–0	4–1	1–2	1–1	2–3
Deportivo Municipal	0–1	2–0	0–2	2–0	2–1		1–0	1–0	5–4	4–1
KDT Nacional	0–2	1–1	0–0	0–0	1–0	0–4		1–3	1–2	0–4
Sport Boys	0–1	5–0	1–1	0–0	2–0	0–2	5–0		1–0	1–0
Sporting Cristal	2–0	0–0	2–1	4–0	2–0	2–1	1–1	2–1		1–1
Universitario	1–0	3–1	3–2	4–2	4–0	1–2	1–0	2–0	2–1	

Updated to match(es) played on 1964. Source: Diario El Comercio, La Prensa and Crónica.
Legend: Blue = home team win; Yellow = draw; Red = away team win.

== Liguilla Final ==
=== Standings ===
Pos	Team	Pld	W	D	L	GF	GA	GD	Pts	Qualification or relegation	UNI	ALI	MUN	SBA	CRI
1	Universitario (C)	22	17	2	3	49	18	+31	36	1965 Copa Libertadores		2–1	0–0		
2	Alianza Lima	22	11	5	6	37	19	+18	27				2–2		0–0
3	Deportivo Municipal	22	12	3	7	40	27	+13	27					1–2	5–1
4	Sport Boys	22	11	3	8	33	18	+15	25		0–2	0–1			
5	Sporting Cristal	22	10	5	7	32	25	+7	25		0–2			0–1	

Legend: Blue = home team win; Yellow = draw; Red = away team win.
(C) Champions

== Liguilla Descenso ==
=== Standings ===
Pos	Team	Pld	W	D	L	GF	GA	GD	Pts	Qualification or relegation	IQU	DLI	CIC	CAR	KDT
1	Centro Iqueño	22	10	5	7	24	24	0	25					2–1	2–1
2	Defensor Breña	22	7	6	9	30	31	−1	20		1–0			1–1	
3	Ciclista Lima	22	6	5	11	25	39	−14	17		1–0	1–3			
4	Carlos Concha	22	3	5	14	20	51	−31	11				0–0		3–3
5	KDT Nacional (R)	22	1	5	16	12	50	−38	7	1965 Segunda División		0–5	1–2		

Legend: Blue = home team win; Yellow = draw; Red = away team win.
(R) Relegated

== Top scorers ==
Rank	Player	Club	Goals
1	(Peru) Ángel Uribe	Universitario	15
2	(Peru) Nemesio Mosquera	Deportivo Municipal	14
2	(Peru) Víctor Zegarra	Alianza Lima	14
3	(Brazil) Wilson Buzzone	Sport Boys	11
3	(Peru) Jorge Vásquez	Sporting Cristal	11
4	(Peru) Pedro Pablo León	Alianza Lima	10
4	(Peru) José Carrasco	Deportivo Municipal	10
4	(Peru) Alejandro Guzmán	Universitario	10

== See also ==
- 1964 Peruvian Segunda División
