= Alberto Gallardo =

Peruvian footballer (1940–2001)

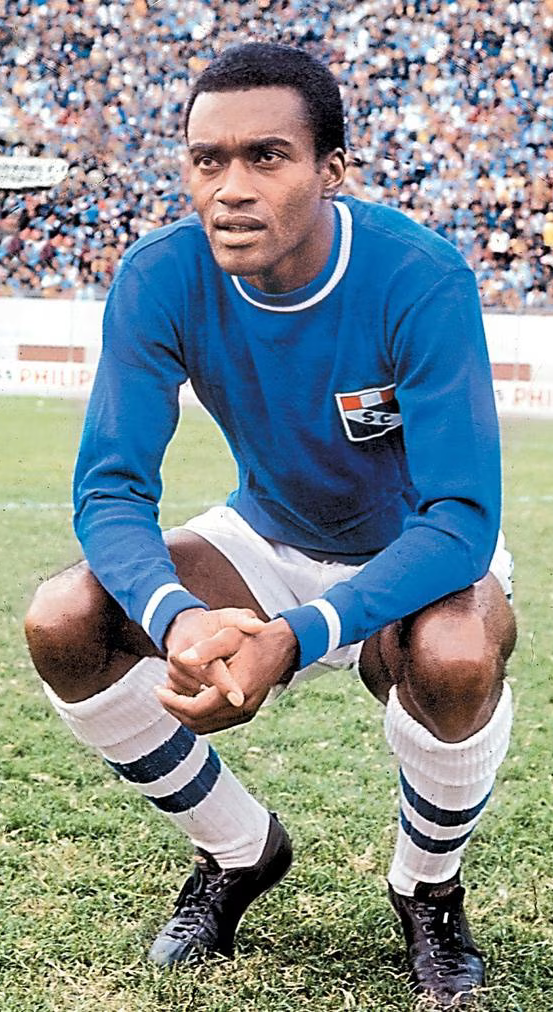
- Gallardo playing for Sporting Cristal

Personal information
- Full name: Félix Alberto Gallardo Mendoza
- Date of birth: 28 November 1940
- Place of birth: Chincha Alta, Ica, Peru
- Date of death: 19 January 2001 (aged 60)
- Place of death: Lima, Lima Province, Peru
- Height: 1.82 m (6 ft 0 in)
- Position: Left winger

Senior career*
Years	Team	Apps	(Gls)
1958	Mariscal Castilla	18	(12)
1959–1963	Sporting Cristal	72	(56)
1963–1964	AC Milan	15	(2)
1964–1966	Cagliari	40	(6)
1966–1967	Palmeiras	47	(22)
1968–1975	Sporting Cristal	170	(71)
Total		362	(169)

International career
1962–1972	Peru	37	(11)

Managerial career
- 1981–1982: Sporting Cristal
- 1985: Sporting Cristal
- 1988–1989: Sporting Cristal
- 2000: Coronel Bolognesi
- * Club domestic league appearances and goals

Félix Alberto Gallardo Mendoza (28 November 1940 – 19 January 2001) was a Peruvian football player and manager who played as a forward. He is regarded as a renowned sprinter, possessing shooting power and an atypical physical display for Peruvian football. For years he was a renowned left wing of Sporting Cristal and the National Peruvian Team from where he launched strong shots with either of the two profiles. Because of his style of play, he was popularly known as the "Jet". He is considered one of the best Peruvian wingers of all time.

He began his career with Club Mariscal Castilla but the Bentín family, founder of Sporting Cristal, signed him for the sky-blue team and his decision resulted in the consecration of the best player in the history of the Rimense club. Gallardo played 14 seasons with Sporting Cristal, scoring 148 goals in 261 games, won the Peruvian Primera División four times and became the top scorer twice in the championship. In 1963, he stood out in the Copa América by scoring four goals and, for the following season, joined AC Milan which was the current European champion at that time. Within the team, he had little continuity and shortly after he was loaned to Cagliari Calcio where he had some regularity. In 1966, he decided to go to Brazil and joined Palmeiras. There he had his best performance abroad, managing to be a two-time Brasileirao champion as well as winning the 1966 Campeonato Paulista. During the 1970 FIFA World Cup, he scored two goals one against Bulgaria in the group stage, and another against Brazil in the quarterfinals. In addition to Teófilo Cubillas, the top Peruvian scorer in the World Cups, is the only Peruvian player to have scored more than one goal in the history of Peruvian participation in the World Cups.

He is considered the greatest idol of Sporting Cristal where he won five national championships with one of them as the technical director. He is also recognized for his great work in the lower divisions of the club, to which he dedicated a large part of his life until the day of his death. Within the Peruvian national team, he played 37 games in which he scored 11 goals, participated in the 1960 Summer Olympics, the 1963 South American Championship and the 1970 FIFA World Cup.

== Personal life ==
Alberto Gallardo was born on the Rosero Bajo Hacienda within Chincha Alta on 28 November 1940. He was the son of Víctor Gallardo Cartagena and Victoria Mendoza Zegarra. He moved to Lima with his family at the age of nine. Gallardo studied at the Colegio Puericultorio Pérez Araníbar where he began his love for football. Due to the poverty of his home country, it was very difficult for him to play sports as a child which was why he had to train much more than other young athletes to stand out in his school. The consistency in the training of Gallardo was highlighted since its inception, a topic that has generated various stories. In life, he was married to Carmen Ferreyros in 1964 and the couple had three daughters and lived in the Santa Catalina urbanization, in the La Victoria district.

He died on 19 January 2001 at 6:40 p.m. after long hours of stay in intensive care at the Javier Prado Clinic due to internal bleeding caused by a ruptured spleen complicated by a severe appendicitis condition. His remains were buried in the Jardines de La Paz Cemetery in the La Molina District.

== Club career ==
=== Beginnings ===
He signed for the modest Mariscal Castilla after being observed by some directors in a match played by his school in the city of Huacho and which caught his attention due to the enormous potential they saw in him. Along with his career as a footballer, he also worked as an office worker at the club since his salary was very low. Mariscal Castilla was the surprise club of the 1959 Peruvian Primera División, finishing the tournament in third place; Gallardo's good performances earned him his call-up to the Peruvian national football team that would participate in the 1960 Summer Olympics.

The Bentín family who were the founders of Sporting Cristal was interested in Alberto Gallardo since before the championship ended. Thus, both reached an agreement even before his departure for the Olympic Games. Upon his return, Gallardo became part of Sporting Cristal. His debut with the Rimense club took place on 10 September 1960 in the game that Cristal beat Mariscal Sucre 3–1. Gallardo scored his first goal on 1 October against Sport Boys in a 2–2 draw. Gallardo would score five more goals that tournament.

=== Consecration ===
During the following years, Gallardo would enter the history of the Bajopontino club. In 1961, under the guidance of coach Juan Honores, Sporting Cristal had an excellent campaign with a team full of many youth players. Among them were Orlando de la Torre, Eloy Campos, Roberto Elías, Alberto Ramírez and José del Castillo. Gallardo stood out with seventeen goals throughout the championship in eighteen games played. The national title had to be defined with Alianza Lima, beating it 2–0 with a goal scored by Gallardo. With his goal in the final, Gallardo was proclaimed top scorer of the year with eighteen goals. This gave Sporting Cristal its second title in the tournament and the first time it had the tournament's top scorer.

In the 1962 Copa Libertadores, he scored three goals, one of them in the historic victory against Racing Club de Avellaneda as this was the first victory for the Sporting Cristal club in the history of the continental tournament. With a view to that year's championship, he participated with the club in a tour around the world where matches were held with clubs from Europe, Africa, North America and Asia, 16 and with some national teams such as South Korea and Singapore. Gallardo managed to score thirty-seven goals in thirty games played, 18Of which the club won twenty, drew seven and lost three. At the end of that year, he once again proclaimed himself the runner-up scorer with twenty-two goals.

Due to his great performance, he was called up for the Peru national football team for the 1963 South American Championship where he had another outstanding performance by being the team's top scorer with four goals. Upon his return to Sporting Cristal, he continued his scoring streak scoring ten goals in thirteen games played. His good performances made several foreign clubs take notice of him and by the middle of the year, Gallardo signed for AC Milan.

=== Career abroad ===
Gallardo would play for AC Milan beginning in the 1963–64 season which recently became the champion of the 1962–63 European Cup and alternated with great figures of the time such as Cesare Maldini and Gianni Rivera. Gallardo however wouldn't play much matches within the club however, playing only fifteen games in which he scored two goals.

In 1964, he was loaned to Cagliari Calcio, a club where he played more regularity. He stayed there until 1966 and scored six goals. He had a brief return to Peru to play a friendly match between Sporting Cristal and FC Barcelona on 25 July 1964 to raise funds after the Estadio Nacional disaster. The match ended tied at two goals with one of them being scored by Gallardo himself.

After an irregular season with Calcio, he was signed by the Brazilian Palmeiras in 1966, a team that was committed to relegation. Gallardo would be more prominent within the club and won important titles. That year he won the Paulista Championship . The following season he won the two most important tournaments in Brazil, the Taça Brasil and the Roberto Gomes Pedrosa Tournament, thus consecrating himself the winner of the two Brasileirãos in 1967. Gallardo played forty-nine games in two seasons, in which he scored sixteen goals.

=== Idol of Sporting Cristal ===
After his career in Brazil, he returned to Sporting Cristal at the request of the Brazilian coach Didi. Gallardo played in the 1968 Copa Libertadores where he had a good performance and scored five goals but Gallardo would receive various injuries in the same year. However, he would score ten goals in twenty games played. One of the most memorable matches of Gallardo was that of the 1968 Torneo Descentralizado final against Juan Aurich, often considered to be the "revelation" team of the year. In a completely full National Stadium of Peru, Cristal and Aurich played a very close match that was open to anyone. In the 52nd minute, Alberto Gallardo entered and barely four minutes after his arrival he opened the scoring with a typical goal of his: he struck into space, received a long pass and scored a goal with a powerful left foot. In the next play, just after play had resumed, Gallardo stole the ball, reached the area and, based on dribbling, caused a penalty that he himself converted to seal the match. Gallardo had his great night that earned him his second championship at Sporting Cristal and definitely gave him the quality of an idol of the club.

He scored three goals in the 1969 Copa Libertadores and in that tournament, Cristal would set another record of remaining undefeated for seventeen consecutive games, a continental record that still stands today. Of them, he won eight and drew nine. The streak began on 20 February 1962 when they beat Racing Club de Argentina 2–1 in Lima and continued until 11 March 1969 when they fell 2–0 in Santiago against Santiago Wanderers. Gallardo would score seven goals that year.

His third title came in the 1970 Torneo Descentralizado as he reached third place and qualified for the final round. 25 In the final league of six games, an almost perfect score was accumulated, winning five games and tying the rest with which he surpassed Universitario de Deportes by one point and won the championship. According to the general opinion of the press at the time, Alberto Gallardo with his seventeen goals was deemed to be the best player of that year.

In 1971 he played again in the 1971 Copa Libertadores. He participated in the match against Boca Juniors that ended with a pitched battle at La Bombonera where he would kick Rubén Suñé in the face after he attacked Gallardo with a corner flag. In the Peruvian tournament, he plays twenty-six games and scores twenty-two goals, leaving the team in fourth place in the tournament. On 13 June 1971, he managed, for the first time in the history of Sporting Cristal, to score 4 goals in a match against Porvenir Miraflores in the 5–2 win.

In 1972, Gallardo played all seven games in the first round of the Metropolitan Tournament, scoring one goal but he would then be called up to the national team for the Mundialito played in Brazil. In the middle of that year, an injury produced with the Peruvian team prevented him from playing for the rest of that year. But equally the team from Bajo Pontino achieved its fourth crown under the leadership of the Peruvian director Marcos Calderón.

In 1973, he managed to score seven goals in thirty-three games played and Sporting Cristal finished runner-up in Peru. The following year in 1974, he played twenty-two games and beat rival teams eleven times. At the end of 1974, he announced his retirement from football to dedicate himself to directing the lower divisions of the club. In October 1976, at the request of Ricardo Bentín Mujica, he returned to the courts. It was in a match against Alianza Lima at night that morning when Mrs. Esther Grande had died. Despite all this, Cristal thrashed 3–0 with his scores. That year Gallardo played nine games and scored five times.

When he had retired from football again, the Cristal managers asked him to play the remainder of the 1977 Copa Libertadores because the team was performing poorly. His last two goals were scored at the Estadio Nacional del Perú against Deportivo Junín in a game that, after losing 0–3, the sky-blues won 5–3 and for the remainder of that year, he would play 10 more games. 1978 was the year of his final retirement, his last official presentation was on 19 February, at age 37 against Unión Huaral at the Julio Lores Colán Stadium. Sporting Cristal fell 2–0 and Gallardo entered in the second half, replacing Reynaldo Jaime.

In total, Gallardo scored 148 goals with Sporting Cristal's kit, 137 for the local tournament and 11 for the Copa Libertadores.

== International career ==
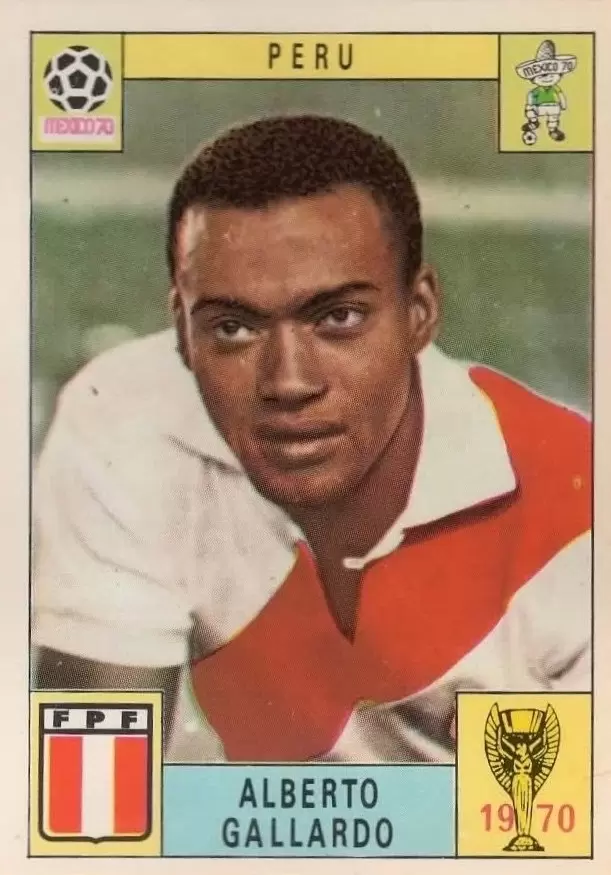
Gallardo's trading card from the Mexico 70 series issued by Panini.

Gallardo was a member of the Peruvian team that participated in the 1960 Summer Olympics.

His debut with the senior team occurred on 10 March 1963, 1 in the match against Brazil in the 1963 South American Championship, which ended 1–0 in favor of the cariocas. His first goal with his team occurred the following date in the 2–1 win over Argentina. He scored three more goals in the tournament and was the team's top scorer. Despite being one of the few football players playing abroad, he was not considered to play in the 1966 World Cup qualifiers.

His great moment came in the 1970 World Cup Qualifiers, when he won the title again after two duels against Brazil where he scored two goals. He scored against Bolivia in La Paz which would have meant the early qualification of Peru but inexplicably annulled by referee Chechelev. Regardless, he scored in triumphant victory against Bolivia at Lima with the score of 3–0, later qualifying for the 1970 FIFA World Cup hosted in Mexico. In the 1970 World Cup, he scored two goals: one against Bulgaria in the group stage and Brazil in the quarterfinals. With his two goals, Gallardo was the second top Peruvian scorer in the World Cups, only behind Teófilo Cubillas.

His last participations with the Peruvian team occurred during the Brazil Independence Cup in 1972. Gallardo scored his last goal on 11 June 1972 against Bolivia and played his last game on 25 June 1972 against Yugoslavia.

== Career as a coach ==
Gallardo made his debut as a coach by leading the team on an interim basis on 7 August 1977 in the match that Sporting Cristal defeated Universitario 2–1 at the Estadio Nacional where Héctor Chumpitaz also made his debut with the light blue shirt. He also led the matches against Coronel Bolognesi (0–0) and Sport Boys (1–3).

Then, he went on to manage the club's lower divisions while working as an assistant to coaches Roque Gastón Máspoli, José Fernández and Marcos Calderón who would later achieve Cristal's first two-time championship in 1979 and 1980.

In 1981 he continued to dedicate himself to the club's sister club known as Esther Grande de Bentín but in April of that year Marcos Calderón would switch clubs and Gallardo assumed the position of technical director of the team from May 1981 until the beginning of 1982. After José Chiarella's departure, Gallardo led the first team again in 1985 until August. At the end of July, he directed and retired another idol of the club, Alfredo Quesada.

At the end of 1988, Gallardo resumed again after replacing Óscar Montalvo for the final league where Cristal became national champion. Under his direction, the team lost to Alianza Atlético (0–1), drew against Alianza Lima (1–1), Universitario (0–0) and defeated Octavio Espinoza (1–0) and Unión Huaral (1–0), proclaiming himself champion of the Torneo Descentralizado. As the winner of the contest, he played the national final of the year against Universitario, defeating them 2–1 and thus achieving his first championship as a coach. The following year he also got the Regional Tournament 1989-I 34 and went on to lead the lower divisions again.

The following years he led clubs in the Peruvian Segunda División, obtaining promotion to the first division with all of them with Unión Huaral in 1994, Guardia Republicana in 1995 and Alcides Vigo in 1996. Gallardo got his personal three-time championship, curiously the same years in which Sporting Cristal was proclaimed three-time Peruvian soccer champion . He nearly achieved the Copa Perú title in 2000, managing Coronel Bolognesi but they lost in the final of the tournament against Estudiantes de Medicina. His last positions as a coach were the boys from categories 84 and 85 of Sporting Cristal before his death on 19 January 2001.

=== Youth coach ===
For his recognized work with youth clubs, he was the coach of the U-20 National Team that was planned to participate in the 1981 South American U-20 Championship in Ecuador but would withdraw. Likewise Gallardo was appointed coach of the U-17 National Team that participated in the 1993 South American U-17 Championship. In the tournament, Peru placed third in their group and was eliminated in the group stage.

== Career statistics ==
=== Club goals ===
Club	Season	League		International^{(1)}		Total ^{(2)}		Median of Goals
Club	Season	Matches	Goals	Matches	Goals	Matches	Goals	Median of Goals
Mariscal Castilla; Peru
Mariscal Castilla; Peru	1959	18	12	-	-	18	12	0.67
Mariscal Castilla; Peru	Total Record	18	12	0	0	18	12	0.67
Sporting Cristal; Peru
Sporting Cristal; Peru	1960	15	6	-	-	15	6	0.4
Sporting Cristal; Peru	1961	18	17	-	-	18	17	0.94
Sporting Cristal; Peru	1962	17	22	4	3	21	25	1.19
Sporting Cristal; Peru	1963	13	10	-	-	13	10	0.77
Sporting Cristal; Peru	1968	20	10	10	5	30	15	0.5
Sporting Cristal; Peru	1969	15	7	8	3	23	10	0.43
Sporting Cristal; Peru	1970	28	17	-	-	28	17	0.61
Sporting Cristal; Peru	1971	26	22	4	0	30	22	0.73
Sporting Cristal; Peru	1972	7	1	-	-	7	1	0.14
Sporting Cristal; Peru	1973	33	7	-	-	33	7	0.21
Sporting Cristal; Peru	1974	22	11	-	-	22	11	0.50
Sporting Cristal; Peru	1976	9	5	-	-	9	5	0.56
Sporting Cristal; Peru	1977	11	2	-	-	11	2	0.18
Sporting Cristal; Peru	1978	1	0	-	-	1	0	0.00
Sporting Cristal; Peru	Total Record	235	137	26	11	261	148	0.57
AC Milan; Italy
AC Milan; Italy	1963–64	15	2	-	-	15	2	0.13
AC Milan; Italy	Total Record	15	2	0	0	15	2	0.13
Cagliari Calcio; Italy
Cagliari Calcio; Italy	1964–65	20	1	-	-	20	1	0.05
Cagliari Calcio; Italy	1965–66	20	6	–	–	20	6	0.30
Cagliari Calcio; Italy	Total Record	40	7	0	0	40	7	0.18
Palmeiras; Brazil	1966–68	49	22	-	-	49	22	0.44
Palmeiras; Brazil	Total Record	49	22	0	0	49	22	0.44
Complete Career		357	178	26	11	383	189	0.49
^{(1)} Includes matches of the Copa Libertadores.^{(2)} Excludes goals from friendly matches.

=== International goals ===
List of international goals scored by Alberto Gallardo
No.	Date	Venue	Opponent	Score	Result	Competition
1.	13 March 1963	Estadio Félix Capriles, Cochabamba, Bolivia	Argentina	2–1	2–1	1963 South American Championship
2.	21 March 1963	Estadio Hernando Siles, La Paz, Bolivia	Bolivia	1–2	2–3	1963 South American Championship
3.	24 March 1963	Estadio Hernando Siles, La Paz, Bolivia	Colombia	1–1	1–1	1963 South American Championship
4.	27 March 1963	Estadio Félix Capriles, Cochabamba, Bolivia	Paraguay	1–3	1–4	1963 South American Championship
5.	7 April 1969	Estádio Beira-Rio, Porto Alegre, Brazil	Brazil	1–2	1–2	Friendly
6.	4 September 1969	Maracanã Stadium, Rio de Janeiro, Brazil	Brazil	2–3	2–3	Friendly
7.	17 August 1969	Estadio Nacional, Lima, Peru	Bolivia	3–0	3–0	1970 FIFA World Cup Qualifiers
8.	21 April 1970	Estadio Nacional, Lima, Peru	Honduras	3–0	3–0	Friendly
9.	2 June 1970	Estadio Nou Camp, León, Mexico	Bulgaria	1–2	3–2	1970 FIFA World Cup
10.	14 June 1970	Estadio Jalisco, Guadalajara, Brazil	Brazil	1–2	2–4	1970 FIFA World Cup
11.	11 June 1972	Estádio Couto Pereira, Curitiba, Brazil	Bolivia	1–0	3–0	Brazil Independence Cup
