= Juan de la Vega (footballer) =

Peruvian footballer (born 1934)

Personal information
- Full name: Juan Alberto de la Vega Durand
- Date of birth: 10 March 1934 (age 92)
- Place of birth: Chorrillos (Lima), Peru
- Positions: Centre back; defensive midfielder

Senior career*
Years	Team	Apps	(Gls)
?–1957	Carlos Concha		
1958	Mariscal Castilla		
1959–1968	Alianza Lima		
1969–1970	Octavio Espinosa		

International career
1959–1968	Peru	18	(0)
- * Club domestic league appearances and goals

Juan Alberto de la Vega Durand (born 10 March 1934) is a Peruvian professional footballer who played as central back or defensive midfielder.

He is considered one of the idols of Alianza Lima, of which he was the captain in the 1960s

== Playing career ==
=== Club career ===
Juan de la Vega began his career in the Peruvian second division with Carlos Concha. In 1958, he transferred to Mariscal Castilla, where he made his debut in the first division.

However, he spent the majority of his career with Alianza Lima, notably winning three Peruvian championships in 1962, 1963, and 1965. He also played in three Copa Libertadores tournaments with the club in 1963, 1964, and 1966 (16 matches in total).

He finished his career in 1970 with Octavio Espinosa of Ica.

=== International career ===
A Peruvian international, Juan de la Vega received 18 caps between 1959 and 1968 (scoring no goals). He notably participated in two South American championships: in 1959 in Argentina (six matches played) and in 1963 in Bolivia (five matches).

== Honours ==
Alianza Lima

- Peruvian Primera División (3): 1962, 1963, 1965
