= 1962 Peruvian Segunda División =

Peruvian Segunda División
- Season: 1962
- Dates: 15 July 1962 – 11 November 1962
- Champions: Mariscal Sucre
- Runner up: Carlos Concha
- Relegated: Santiago Barranco
- Matches: 90
- Goals: 304 (3.38 per match)
- Top goalscorer: Jorge Cabanillas (12 goals)

The 1962 Peruvian Segunda División, the second division of Peruvian football (soccer), was played by 10 teams. The tournament winner, Mariscal Sucre was promoted to the 1963 Peruvian Primera División.

The entire tournament was played at the Estadio Fray Martín de Porres in Lima.

== Competition format ==
All teams faced each other in a double round-robin format, playing home and away matches. The team that accumulated the highest number of points at the end of the season was automatically crowned champion and promoted to the Peruvian Primera División, while the team with the fewest points was relegated to the Ligas Provinciales de Lima y Callao.

Two points were awarded for a win, one point for a draw, and no points for a loss.

== Teams ==
=== Team changes ===
| Promoted from 1961 Triangular de Ascenso | Promoted to 1962 Primera División | Relegated from 1961 Primera División | Relegated to 1962 Liga Provincial de Lima |
|---|---|---|---|
| ▲ Íntimos de La Legua (1st) | ▲KDT Nacional (1st) | ▼ Mariscal Sucre (10th) | ▼ Mariscal Castilla (10th) |

=== Stadia and locations ===
| Team | City |
|---|---|
| Association Chorrillos | Chorrillos, Lima |
| Carlos Concha | Callao |
| Defensor Arica | Breña, Lima |
| Íntimos de La Legua | Callao |
| Juventud Gloria | Jesús María, Lima |
| Mariscal Sucre | La Victoria, Lima |
| Porvenir Miraflores | Miraflores, Lima |
| Santiago Barranco | Barranco, Lima |
| Unidad Vecinal Nº3 | Cercado de Lima |
| Unión América | Cercado de Lima |

== League table ==
=== Standings ===
| Pos | Team | Pld | W | D | L | GF | GA | GD | Pts | Qualification or relegation |
|---|---|---|---|---|---|---|---|---|---|---|
| 1 | Mariscal Sucre (C) | 18 | 10 | 6 | 2 | 40 | 29 | +11 | 26 | 1963 Primera División |
| 2 | Carlos Concha | 18 | 9 | 5 | 4 | 36 | 26 | +10 | 23 | |
| 3 | Porvenir Miraflores | 18 | 8 | 6 | 4 | 37 | 28 | +9 | 22 | |
| 4 | Unión América | 18 | 9 | 2 | 7 | 30 | 23 | +7 | 20 | |
| 5 | Association Chorrillos | 18 | 8 | 4 | 6 | 30 | 21 | +9 | 20 | |
| 6 | Íntimos de La Legua | 18 | 7 | 6 | 5 | 32 | 30 | +2 | 20 | |
| 7 | Unidad Vecinal Nº3 | 18 | 6 | 2 | 10 | 33 | 33 | 0 | 14 | |
| 8 | Juventud Gloria | 18 | 6 | 2 | 10 | 26 | 42 | −16 | 14 | |
| 9 | Defensor Arica | 18 | 3 | 5 | 10 | 21 | 41 | −20 | 11 | |
| 10 | Santiago Barranco (R) | 18 | 5 | 0 | 13 | 19 | 31 | −12 | 10 | 1963 Liga de los Balnearios del Sur |

Source: Diario La Crónica
(C) Champions; (R) Relegated

== Results ==
| Home \ Away | ASS | CAR | DEF | INT | JUV | MAR | POR | SAN | UVE | UAM |
|---|---|---|---|---|---|---|---|---|---|---|
| Association Chorrillos | | 0–2 | 2–0 | 2–2 | 3–0 | 3–1 | 2–0 | 2–1 | 5–1 | 2–1 |
| Carlos Concha | 0–0 | | 2–0 | 2–2 | 1–1 | 4–1 | 3–3 | 1–0 | 3–2 | 1–0 |
| Defensor Arica | 1–1 | 1–4 | | 0–6 | 2–2 | 2–3 | 1–1 | 2–1 | 2–1 | 0–0 |
| Íntimos de La Legua | 0–2 | 4–1 | 3–1 | | 2–0 | 2–2 | 2–1 | 1–0 | 0–0 | 1–0 |
| Juventud Gloria | 3–1 | 1–4 | 3–2 | 1–0 | | 0–2 | 1–4 | 4–1 | 3–1 | 2–1 |
| Mariscal Sucre | 3–3 | 1–1 | 1–0 | 3–3 | 5–2 | | 1–1 | 2–0 | 3–2 | 2–1 |
| Porvenir Miraflores | 3–2 | 3–1 | 2–1 | 2–2 | 5–0 | 2–2 | | 2–1 | 2–1 | 1–3 |
| Santiago Barranco | 1–0 | 4–1 | 1–4 | 4–0 | 2–1 | 0–2 | 0–2 | | 1–2 | 2–0 |
| Unidad Vecinal Nº3 | 1–0 | 0–4 | 7–1 | 5–1 | 4–1 | 1–2 | 1–1 | 2–0 | | 1–2 |
| Unión América | 1–0 | 3–1 | 1–1 | 4–1 | 2–1 | 3–4 | 4–2 | 2–0 | 2–1 | |

Updated to match(es) played on 1962. Source: Diario El Comercio, La Prensa and Crónica.
Legend: Blue = home team win; Yellow = draw; Red = away team win.

== Liguilla de Promoción a Segunda División ==
Deportivo Vigil, as champions of the 1962 Liga Provincial del Callao, and Atlético Lusitania, as champions of the 1962 Liga Provincial de Lima, were supposed to play a final to determine promotion to the 1963 Segunda División.

Defensor Espinar, as the champion of the 1962 Liga de los Balnearios del Sur, did not participate because the FPF annulled the tournament due to the clubs’ defiance in refusing to comply with the decision of the FPF’s Disciplinary Committee to play the suspended match between Víctor Bielich and Ciclista Alianza Miraflores.

| Team 1 | Score | Team 2 |
|---|---|---|
| Atlético Lusitania | 8–0 | Deportivo Vigil |

Atlético Lusitania earned promotion to the 1963 Segunda División.

== Torneo Equipos de Reserva ==
Alongside the Second Division championship, a reserve teams tournament was held, featuring the reserve teams of the participating clubs.

The tournament was played in a knockout format, with the reserve teams of Carlos Concha and Association Chorrillos reaching the final.

=== Final ===
| Team 1 | Score | Team 2 |
|---|---|---|
| Association Chorrillos | – | Carlos Concha |

== See also ==
- 1962 Peruvian Primera División
