= Víctor Zegarra =

Peruvian footballer and manager (born 1940)

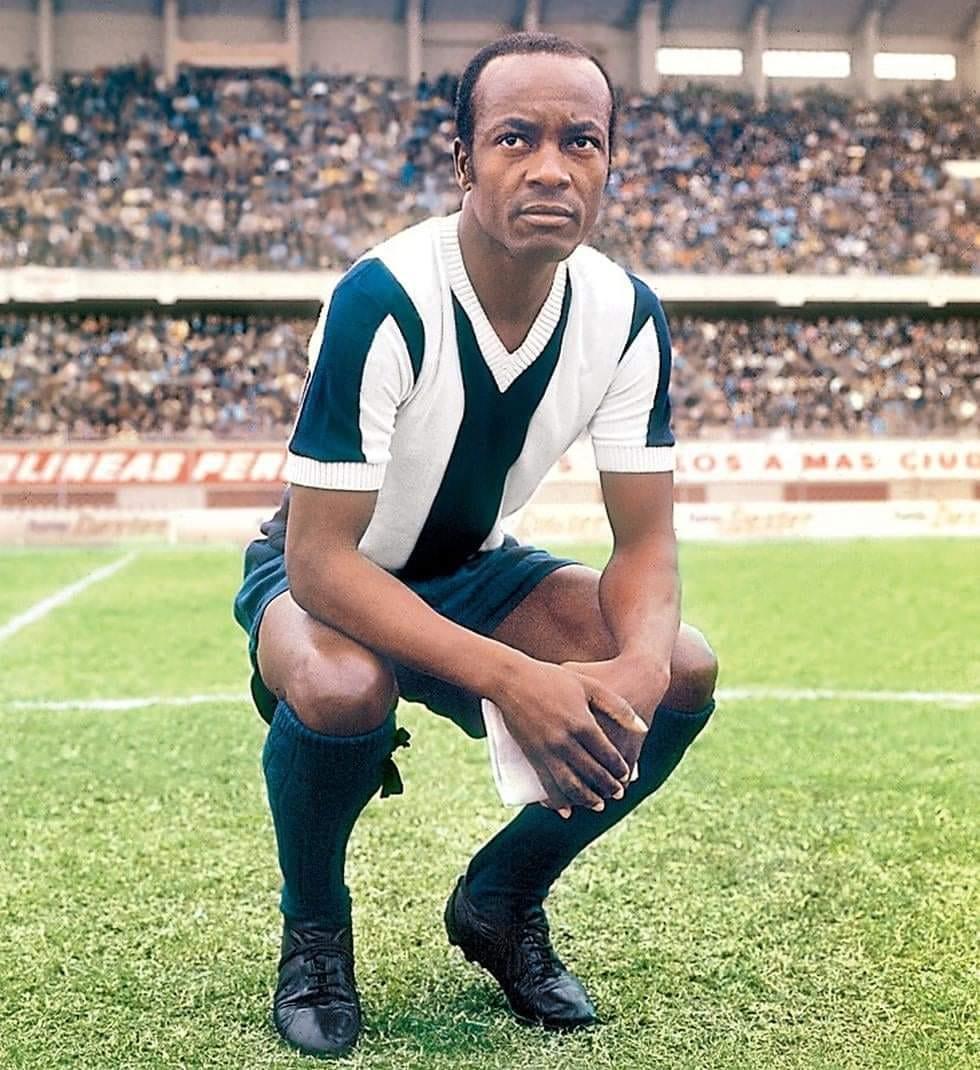

Personal information
- Full name: Alejandro Víctor Zegarra Salé
- Date of birth: 18 March 1940 (age 86)
- Place of birth: Chincha Alta, Peru

Senior career*
Years	Team	Apps	(Gls)
1958–1974	Alianza Lima		
1975	Unión Tumán		
1976	FBC Melgar		
1977–1978	Alianza Lima		
1979	Deportivo Bata		

International career
1962–1969	Peru	19	(3)

Managerial career
- 1976: FBC Melgar (player-coach)
- 1981–1982: Alianza Lima
- 1983: Alianza Lima
- 1984: C.N.I.
- 1985: Deportivo Junín
- 1986–1987: Juventud La Joya
- 1987: Deportivo Pucallpa
- 1988: Cienciano
- 1990: Unión Huaral
- 2000: Alianza Lima
- * Club domestic league appearances and goals

Alejandro Víctor Zegarra Salé (born 18 March 1940) is a Peruvian football manager and former player.

Nicknamed Pitín Zegarra, he is one of the idols of Alianza Lima. Two of his sons, Pablo Zegarra and Carlos Zegarra, were Peruvian internationals, the former also being a coach.

== Playing career ==
=== Club career ===
With 19 seasons spent with Alianza Lima, Víctor Pitín Zegarra was a key player. Winning three league titles (in 1962, 1963, and 1965) between 1958 and 1974, he shared the spotlight in the 1960s with other Alianza icons such as Julio Baylón, Luis Babalú Martínez, Pedro Pablo León and Teófilo Cubillas, forming an attacking line considered by some to be the best in the club's history.

In 1975, he had a brief stint at Unión Tumán, then the following year at FBC Melgar before returning to Alianza, where he won the title again in 1977 and 1978. He moved to Bolivia in 1979 (to Deportivo Bata) where he ended his career.

=== International career ===
A Peruvian international between 1962 and 1969, Pitín Zegarra played in the 1963 South American Championship and then in the 1966 World Cup qualifiers (scoring one goal). He played a total of 19 matches for the Peruvian national team, scoring three goals.

== Managerial career ==
He had his first experience on the bench as a player-coach for FBC Melgar in 1976. But his coaching career remains associated with Alianza Lima, which he managed in the 1980s and in 2000 (on an interim basis, after the departure of Jorge Luis Pinto).

== Honours ==
=== Player ===
- Peruvian Primera División (5): 1962, 1963, 1965, 1977, 1978
