= 1963 Peruvian Segunda División =

Peruvian Segunda División
- Season: 1963
- Dates: 18 May 1963 – 22 September 1963
- Champions: Carlos Concha
- Runner up: Porvenir Miraflores
- Relegated: Association Chorrillos
- Matches: 90
- Goals: 255 (2.83 per match)
- Top goalscorer: Jorge Villafuerte (16 goals)

The 1963 Peruvian Segunda División, the second division of Peruvian football (soccer), was played by 10 teams. The tournament winner, Carlos Concha was promoted to the 1964 Peruvian Primera División.

The entire tournament was played at the Estadio Fray Martín de Porres in Lima.

== Competition format ==
All teams faced each other in a double round-robin format, playing home and away matches. The team that accumulated the highest number of points at the end of the season was automatically crowned champion and promoted to the Peruvian Primera División, while the team with the fewest points was relegated to the Ligas Provinciales de Lima y Callao.

Two points were awarded for a win, one point for a draw, and no points for a loss.

== Teams ==
=== Team changes ===
Promoted from 1962 Liguilla de Promoción	Promoted to 1963 Primera División	Relegated from 1962 Primera División	Relegated to 1963 Liga de los Balnearios del Sur
▲ Atlético Lusitania (1st)	▲ Mariscal Sucre (1st)	▼ Atlético Chalaco (10th)	▼ Santiago Barranco (10th)

=== Stadia and locations ===
Team	City
Association Chorrillos	Chorrillos, Lima
Atlético Chalaco	Callao
Atlético Lusitania	Cercado de Lima
Carlos Concha	Callao
Defensor Arica	Breña, Lima
Íntimos de La Legua	Callao
Juventud Gloria	Jesús María, Lima
Porvenir Miraflores	Miraflores, Lima
Unidad Vecinal Nº3	Cercado de Lima
Unión América	Cercado de Lima

== League table ==
=== Standings ===
Pos	Team	Pld	W	D	L	GF	GA	GD	Pts	Qualification or relegation
1	Carlos Concha (C)	18	9	6	3	33	20	+13	24	1964 Primera División
2	Porvenir Miraflores	18	10	3	5	34	22	+12	23	
3	Atlético Lusitania	18	8	4	6	28	26	+2	20	
4	Unidad Vecinal Nº3	18	7	5	6	28	24	+4	19	
5	Atlético Chalaco	18	5	8	5	23	19	+4	18	
6	Defensor Arica	18	7	3	8	28	31	−3	17	
7	Juventud Gloria	18	5	7	6	25	32	−7	17	
8	Íntimos de La Legua	18	6	4	8	21	28	−7	16	
9	Unión América	18	6	2	10	21	24	−3	14	
10	Association Chorrillos (R)	18	4	4	10	14	29	−15	12	1964 Liga de los Balnearios del Sur

(C) Champions; (R) Relegated

== Results ==
Home \ Away	ASS	CHA	LUS	CAR	DEF	INT	JUV	POR	UVE	UAM
Association Chorrillos		W.O.	0–2	1–3	0–1	2–4	0–0	0–2	2–1	0–1
Atlético Chalaco	1–0		2–0	3–3	1–1	1–0	1–1	2–2	1–1	2–0
Atlético Lusitania	1–1	1–1		1–1	3–1	0–2	5–2	0–4	1–3	2–0
Carlos Concha	6–1	1–1	2–3		2–1	1–0	1–2	1–3	0–0	3–0
Defensor Arica	1–4	2–1	2–3	0–1		4–1	1–1	2–1	3–2	1–0
Íntimos de La Legua	2–2	1–0	0–1	2–2	0–0		1–0	2–1	3–2	1–3
Juventud Gloria	0–1	1–5	2–2	0–0	3–5	2–1		4–2	1–3	2–1
Porvenir Miraflores	2–0	1–1	1–0	0–2	3–2	4–0	0–0		3–2	1–2
Unidad Vecinal Nº3	2–0	W.O.	2–1	1–2	3–1	2–2	2–2	0–1		1–0
Unión América	1–1	4–0	0–2	1–2	2–0	2–0	1–2	2–3	1–1	

Updated to match(es) played on 1963. Source: Diario El Comercio, La Prensa and Crónica.
Legend: Blue = home team win; Yellow = draw; Red = away team win.

== Liguilla de Promoción a Segunda División ==
ADO, as champions of the 1963 Liga Provincial del Callao, and Santiago Barranco, as champions of the 1963 Liga de los Balnearios del Sur, were supposed to play a final to determine promotion to the 1964 Segunda División.

The champion of the 1963 Liga Provincial de Lima did not take part in the tournament due to its disagreement with the decision of the Peruvian Football Federation to include the champion club of the Liga Distrital de San Isidro in the Liguilla de Promoción tournament to the 1964 Peruvian Segunda División.

As a result of this situation, the Peruvian Football Federation decided to annul the Liga Provincial de Lima tournament.

Team 1	Score	Team 2
ADO	3–2	Santiago Barranco

ADO earned promotion to the 1964 Segunda División.

== Torneo Equipos de Reserva ==
Alongside the Second Division championship, a reserve teams tournament was held, featuring the reserve teams of the participating clubs.

Porvenir Miraflores and Atlético Chalaco reserve teams finished level on 7 points each after the nine rounds, which required a playoff match to break the tie. Porvenir Miraflores went on to win the decider 4–1.

=== Title play-off ===
Team 1	Score	Team 2
Porvenir Miraflores	4–1	Atlético Chalaco

== Top scorers ==
Rank	Player	Club	Goals
1	(Peru) Jorge Villafuerte	Carlos Concha	16
2	(Peru) Raúl Celler	Porvenir Miraflores	13
3	(Peru) Miguel Monsalve	Unidad Vecinal Nº3	9
4	(Peru) Humberto Magallanes	Juventud Gloria	8
4	(Peru) Julio Robles	Íntimos de La Legua	8
5	(Peru) Carlos Lara	Atlético Lusitania	7

== See also ==
- 1963 Peruvian Primera División
