= Luis Calderón =

Luis Calderón is the name of:

- Luis Calderón (Colombian footballer) (born 1990), Colombian footballer
- Luis Calderón (Peruvian footballer) (1929–2022), Peruvian footballer
