= 1965 Peruvian Primera División =

Primera División
- Season: 1965
- Dates: 19 July 1965 – 26 December 1965
- Champions: Alianza Lima (14th title)
- Runner up: Universitario
- Relegated: Ciclista Lima
- Copa Libertadores: Alianza Lima; Universitario
- Matches: 110
- Goals: 331 (3.01 per match)
- Top goalscorer: Carlos Urrunaga (16 goals)

The 1965 Peruvian Primera División, the top category of Peruvian football, was played by 10 teams. The national champion was Alianza Lima. This was the first season to qualify two teams to the Copa Libertadores and the last to only include teams from Lima and Callao.

== Competition format ==
The season was divided into two stages. In the first stage, each team played the others twice (a double round robin system) for a total of 18 games. Teams received two points for a win and one point for a draw. No points were awarded for a loss. The teams carried their records from the first stage into the second stage. In the second stage, the teams were separated into two groups; an upper-table group and lower-table group. Each group played a further 4 games against the teams in their group. The upper group played for the league title and the lower group played to avoid relegation. The season champion and runner-up qualified for the 1966 Copa Libertadores.

Two points were awarded for a win, one point for a draw, and no points for a loss.

== Teams ==
=== Team changes ===
Promoted from 1964 Segunda División	Relegated from 1964 Primera División
▲ Defensor Arica (1st)	▼KDT Nacional (10th)

=== Stadia locations ===
Team	City	Mannager
Alianza Lima	La Victoria, Lima	(Brazil) Jaime de Almeida
Carlos Concha	Callao	(Peru) Eleuterio Zamudio
Centro Iqueño	Cercado de Lima	(Paraguay) Miguel Ortega
Ciclista Lima	Cercado de Lima	(Brazil) José Gomes Nogueira
Defensor Arica	Breña, Lima	(Peru) Emilio Vargas
Defensor Lima	Breña, Lima	(Peru) Juan Honores
Deportivo Municipal	Cercado de Lima	(Peru) Roberto Drago
Sport Boys	Callao	(Peru) José Chiarella
Sporting Cristal	Rímac, Lima	(Peru) Alberto Terry
Universitario	Breña, Lima	(Peru) Marcos Calderón

== First Stage ==
=== Standings ===
Pos	Team	Pld	W	D	L	GF	GA	GD	Pts	Qualification or relegation
1	Alianza Lima	18	11	6	1	29	14	+15	28	Liguilla Final
2	Universitario	18	9	5	4	27	17	+10	23	Liguilla Final
3	Defensor Lima	18	9	4	5	35	21	+14	22	Liguilla Final
4	Deportivo Municipal	18	10	2	6	21	20	+1	22	Liguilla Final
5	Defensor Arica	18	9	3	6	30	21	+9	21	Liguilla Final
6	Sporting Cristal	18	8	3	7	29	23	+6	19	Liguilla Descenso
7	Sport Boys	18	7	4	7	26	27	−1	18	Liguilla Descenso
8	Centro Iqueño	18	3	5	10	19	33	−14	11	Liguilla Descenso
9	Carlos Concha	18	3	4	11	29	47	−18	10	Liguilla Descenso
10	Ciclista Lima	18	1	4	13	15	37	−22	6	Liguilla Descenso

Source: Peru 1965 season

=== Results ===
Home \ Away	ALI	CAR	IQU	CIC	DAR	DLI	MUN	SBA	CRI	UNI
Alianza Lima		3–1	2–1	3–1	2–2	0–0	1–1	2–1	1–0	1–0
Carlos Concha	1–2		3–1	2–2	1–5	2–0	1–2	3–4	1–0	0–3
Centro Iqueño	0–2	3–3		4–1	1–2	0–5	0–3	2–1	2–2	0–2
Ciclista Lima	0–1	2–2	1–1		2–0	1–4	0–1	1–1	0–3	0–1
Defensor Arica	0–1	3–0	1–0	2–1		2–1	2–0	3–0	1–2	1–1
Defensor Lima	2–2	6–1	1–0	3–1	3–1		3–1	2–2	3–2	0–2
Deportivo Municipal	1–0	2–1	1–1	1–0	2–0	0–1		1–0	0–3	0–1
Sport Boys	0–3	4–3	1–1	2–1	2–1	0–0	3–0		0–2	3–0
Sporting Cristal	1–1	4–3	0–1	2–1	0–2	2–0	3–4	1–0		1–1
Universitario	2–2	1–1	2–1	4–0	2–2	2–1	0–1	1–2	2–1	

Updated to match(es) played on 1965. Source: Diario El Comercio, La Prensa and Crónica.
Legend: Blue = home team win; Yellow = draw; Red = away team win.

== Liguilla Final ==
=== Standings ===
Pos	Team	Pld	W	D	L	GF	GA	GD	Pts	Qualification or relegation	ALI	UNI	DAR	DLI	MUN
1	Alianza Lima (C)	22	12	8	2	35	18	+17	32	1966 Copa Libertadores				1–1	3–0
2	Universitario	22	13	5	4	37	21	+16	31	1966 Copa Libertadores	1–0				3–2
3	Defensor Arica	22	11	4	7	36	27	+9	26		2–2	1–3			
4	Defensor Lima	22	10	5	7	44	28	+16	25			1–3	1–2		
5	Deportivo Municipal	22	10	2	10	24	32	−8	22				0–1	1–5	

Source: Peru 1965 season
Legend: Blue = home team win; Yellow = draw; Red = away team win.
(C) Champions

=== Results ===
1965	Universitario	3–2	Deportivo Municipal

1965	Defensor Arica	2–1	Defensor Lima

1965	Deportivo Municipal	0–1	Defensor Arica

1965	Alianza Lima	1–1	Defensor Lima

12 December 1965	Defensor Arica	2–2	Alianza Lima	Estadio Nacional, Lima

1965	Universitario	3–1	Defensor Lima

1965	Defensor Lima	5–1	Deportivo Municipal

1965	Universitario	1–0	Alianza Lima

25 December 1965	Alianza Lima	3–0	Deportivo Municipal	Estadio Nacional, Lima
	Pedro Pablo León 16' 56'; Víctor Zegarra 65' (pen.)			Attendance: 17,648; Referee: Carlos Rivero

1965	Defensor Arica	1–3	Universitario

== Liguilla Descenso ==
=== Standings ===
Pos	Team	Pld	W	D	L	GF	GA	GD	Pts	Qualification or relegation	CRI	SBA	IQU	CAR	CIC
1	Sporting Cristal	22	10	5	7	41	31	+10	25			3–1			3–0
2	Sport Boys	22	9	5	8	34	33	+1	23				0–0	4–3	
3	Centro Iqueño	22	4	8	10	24	37	−13	16		2–2			2–1	
4	Carlos Concha	22	4	5	13	39	58	−19	13		4–4				2–1
5	Ciclista Lima (R)	22	1	5	16	17	46	−29	7	1966 Segunda División		0–3	1–1		

Source: Peru 1965 season
Legend: Blue = home team win; Yellow = draw; Red = away team win.
(R) Relegated

== Top scorers ==
Rank	Player	Club	Goals
1	(Peru) Carlos Urrunaga	Defensor Lima	16
2	(Peru) Jaime Mosquera	Carlos Concha	12
3	(Peru) Víctor Zegarra	Alianza Lima	10
3	(Peru) Napoleón Rodríguez	Defensor Arica	10
4	(Peru) Carlos Gonzáles Pajuelo	Sporting Cristal	9
4	(Peru) Tomás Iwasaki	Deportivo Municipal	9
4	(Peru) Walter Milera	Sport Boys	9

== See also ==
- 1965 Peruvian Segunda División
- 1965 Ligas Distritales del Peru
- 1965 Torneo Relámpago (Segunda División)
- 1965 Cuadrangular de Campeones Provincianos
