= 1962 Peruvian Primera División =

Peruvian Primera División
- Season: 1962
- Dates: 15 September 1962 – 6 January 1963
- Champions: Alianza Lima (12th title)
- Runner up: Sporting Cristal
- Relegated: Atlético Chalaco
- 1963 Copa Libertadores: Alianza Lima
- Matches: 90
- Goals: 300 (3.33 per match)
- Top goalscorer: Alberto Gallardo (22 goals)

The 1962 season of the Peruvian Primera División, the top category of Peruvian football, was played by 10 teams. The national champions were Alianza Lima.

== Competition format ==
All teams faced each other in a double round-robin format, playing home and away matches. The team that accumulated the highest number of points at the end of the season was automatically crowned champion, while the team with the fewest points was relegated to the Peruvian Segunda División.

Two points were awarded for a win, one point for a draw, and no points for a loss.

== Teams ==
=== Team changes ===
Promoted from 1961 Segunda División	Relegated from 1961 Primera División
▲KDT Nacional (1st)	▼ Mariscal Sucre (10th)

=== Stadia locations ===
Team	City	Mannager
Alianza Lima	La Victoria, Lima	(Brazil) Jaime de Almeida
Atlético Chalaco	Callao	(Brazil) Joao Dias dos Santos
Centro Iqueño	Cercado de Lima	(Uruguay) Ondino Viera
Ciclista Lima	Cercado de Lima	(Peru) Roberto Drago
Defensor Lima	Breña, Lima	(Austria) Erwin Hieger
Deportivo Municipal	Cercado de Lima	(Peru) Juan Valdivieso
KDT Nacional	Callao	(Peru) Alejandro Heredia
Sport Boys	Callao	(Peru) Marcos Calderón
Sporting Cristal	Rímac, Lima	(Peru) Juan Honores
Universitario	Breña, Lima	(Peru) Ismael Soria

== League table ==
=== Standings ===
Pos	Team	Pld	W	D	L	GF	GA	GD	Pts	Qualification or relegation
1	Alianza Lima (C)	18	12	3	3	47	18	+29	27	1963 Copa Libertadores
2	Sporting Cristal	18	12	1	5	42	21	+21	25	
3	Universitario	18	8	6	4	40	30	+10	22	
4	Centro Iqueño	18	8	5	5	39	33	+6	21	
5	Deportivo Municipal	18	7	6	5	22	20	+2	20	
6	Ciclista Lima	18	6	4	8	35	37	−2	16	
7	Defensor Lima	18	6	3	9	21	35	−14	15	
8	KDT Nacional	18	4	6	8	18	29	−11	14	
9	Sport Boys	18	3	5	10	14	27	−13	11	
10	Atlético Chalaco (R)	18	3	3	12	22	50	−28	9	1963 Segunda División

(C) Champions; (R) Relegated

== Results ==
Home \ Away	ALI	CHA	IQU	CIC	DLI	MUN	KDT	SBA	CRI	UNI
Alianza Lima		2–1	5–3	1–2	0–0	1–2	2–0	2–0	4–1	4–2
Atlético Chalaco	0–9		2–2	0–3	1–1	3–1	4–1	3–2	1–2	2–5
Centro Iqueño	2–2	3–0		5–3	1–3	3–3	2–1	2–0	2–1	0–1
Ciclista Lima	2–4	3–1	3–5		6–1	1–2	1–1	1–0	2–4	1–1
Defensor Lima	0–1	3–0	2–1	1–1		1–0	1–2	2–1	1–5	0–5
Deportivo Municipal	0–1	1–0	0–1	2–1	3–1		0–0	1–1	1–1	3–3
KDT Nacional	1–0	2–1	3–3	1–1	2–1	0–1		1–1	0–3	0–2
Sport Boys	1–1	0–0	2–1	0–3	1–2	1–0	1–0		0–2	1–2
Sporting Cristal	1–3	4–1	0–1	4–0	2–0	0–1	4–2	3–1		3–1
Universitario	0–5	6–2	2–2	4–1	3–1	1–1	1–1	1–1	0–2	

Updated to match(es) played on 1962. Source: Diario El Comercio, La Prensa and Crónica.
Legend: Blue = home team win; Yellow = draw; Red = away team win.

== Top scorers ==
Rank	Player	Club	Goals
1	(Peru) Alberto Gallardo	Sporting Cristal	22
2	(Peru) Jesús Peláez	Centro Iqueño	19
3	(Peru) Nemesio Mosquera	Ciclista Lima	15
4	(Peru) Pedro Pablo León	Alianza Lima	14
5	(Peru) Ángel Uribe	Universitario	12
5	(Peru) José Azofra	Ciclista Lima	12

== See also ==
- 1962 Peruvian Segunda División
