= 1961 Peruvian Primera División =

Peruvian Primera División
- Season: 1961
- Dates: 5 August 1961 – 6 January 1962
- Champions: Sporting Cristal (2nd title)
- Runner up: Alianza Lima
- Relegated: Mariscal Sucre
- 1962 Copa Libertadores: Sporting Cristal
- Matches: 91
- Goals: 278 (3.05 per match)
- Top goalscorer: Alberto Gallardo (18 goals)

The 1961 season of the Peruvian Primera División, the top category of Peruvian football, was played by 10 teams. The national champions were Sporting Cristal.

== Competition format ==
All teams faced each other in a double round-robin format, playing home and away matches. The team that accumulated the highest number of points at the end of the season was automatically crowned champion, while the team with the fewest points was relegated to the Peruvian Segunda División.

Two points were awarded for a win, one point for a draw, and no points for a loss.

== Teams ==
=== Team changes ===
Promoted from 1960 Segunda División	Relegated from 1960 Primera División
▲ Defensor Lima (1st)	▼ Mariscal Castilla (10th)

=== Stadia locations ===
Team	City	Mannager
Alianza Lima	La Victoria, Lima	(Brazil) Jaime de Almeida
Atlético Chalaco	Callao	(Peru) Juan Valdivieso
Centro Iqueño	Cercado de Lima	(Paraguay) Miguel Ortega
Ciclista Lima	Cercado de Lima	(Peru) Alejandro Heredia
Defensor Lima	Breña, Lima	(Peru) Adelfo Magallanes
Deportivo Municipal	Cercado de Lima	(Peru) Roberto Drago
Mariscal Sucre	La Victoria, Lima	(Peru) Juan Bulnes
Sport Boys	Callao	(Peru) Marcos Calderón
Sporting Cristal	Rímac, Lima	(Peru) Juan Honores
Universitario	Breña, Lima	(Peru) Segundo Castillo

== League table ==
=== Standings ===
Pos	Team	Pld	W	D	L	GF	GA	GD	Pts	Qualification or relegation
1	Sporting Cristal (C, O)	18	12	2	4	34	21	+13	26	Title play-off
2	Alianza Lima	18	11	4	3	38	16	+22	26	Title play-off
3	Centro Iqueño	18	9	2	7	35	34	+1	20	
4	Universitario	18	6	7	5	34	26	+8	19	
5	Deportivo Municipal	18	8	3	7	35	32	+3	19	
6	Defensor Lima	18	6	5	7	25	28	−3	17	
7	Atlético Chalaco	18	6	3	9	21	29	−8	15	
8	Sport Boys	18	4	7	7	12	20	−8	15	
9	Ciclista Lima	18	5	2	11	19	32	−13	12	
10	Mariscal Sucre (R)	18	4	3	11	23	38	−15	11	1962 Segunda División

(C) Champions; (O) Play-off winners; (R) Relegated

== Results ==
Home \ Away	ALI	CHA	IQU	CIC	DLI	MUN	MSU	SBA	CRI	UNI
Alianza Lima		0–1	3–0	4–1	5–1	2–1	2–0	4–0	0–1	1–1
Atlético Chalaco	2–3		0–1	0–0	3–2	2–1	1–0	2–0	1–3	0–3
Centro Iqueño	2–6	2–0		3–1	2–0	4–2	6–1	1–0	3–2	0–3
Ciclista Lima	0–1	2–1	2–1		1–2	3–1	0–1	0–0	2–3	0–3
Defensor Lima	0–0	1–1	2–3	3–1		5–1	2–0	0–0	0–2	2–1
Deportivo Municipal	0–0	4–2	0–0	5–1	4–0		1–0	0–0	0–3	3–1
Mariscal Sucre	1–3	1–1	4–2	2–1	1–3	0–2		0–1	2–2	4–4
Sport Boys	1–2	2–0	3–3	0–2	1–1	0–2	3–2		0–1	0–0
Sporting Cristal	2–1	2–4	2–0	0–2	1–0	5–3	1–0	0–1		1–1
Universitario	1–1	2–0	3–1	2–0	1–1	4–5	3–4	0–0	1–3	

Updated to match(es) played on 1961. Source: Diario El Comercio, La Prensa and Crónica.
Legend: Blue = home team win; Yellow = draw; Red = away team win.

== Title play-off ==
6 January 1962
20:00 UTC−5

Sporting Cristal	2–0	Alianza Lima
Alberto Ramírez 32'; Alberto Gallardo 82' (pen.)

Estadio Nacional, Lima
Referee: (Argentina) Juan Brozzi

== Top scorers ==
Rank	Player	Club	Goals
1	(Peru) Alberto Gallardo	Sporting Cristal	18
2	(Peru) Óscar Montalvo	Deportivo Municipal	15
3	(Peru) Hugo Arroé	Defensor Lima	13
3	(Peru) Eduardo Flores	Alianza Lima	13
4	(Peru) Juan Biselach	Centro Iqueño	12
5	(Peru) Nemesio Mosquera	Deportivo Municipal	11
5	(Peru) Héctor Valle	Mariscal Sucre	11

== See also ==
- 1961 Campeonato de Apertura
- 1961 Peruvian Segunda División
