= 1968 Sporting Cristal season =

Sporting Cristal
1968 season
- Stadium: San Martín de Porres, Lima
- Torneo Descentralizado: Torneo Descentralizado League: Champions (1°); Final National: Champions; Champions National (1°)
Home colours	Away colours	Third colours

The 1968 Sporting Cristal season were the Thirteenth (13.º) of the club from its foundation in 1955, Thirteen (13) participations consecutives in the top-flight of Peruvian Primera División (of 52 Editions) with denomination Torneo Descentralizado. In Previous Season the club qualified as Runners-up National 2nd Place of the 1967 Torneo Descentralizado.

Sporting Cristal were a of fourteen (14) clubs in the Third edition (3.º) Torneo Descentralizado, the competition most important of the Peruvian football. The club played the Peruvian Primera División and Copa Libertadores for Second (2nd) Time. Sporting Cristal won their 3rd Torneo Descentralizado Title.

== Torneo Descentralizado ==
=== Torneo Descentralizado League ===
Pos	Team	Pld	W	D	L	GF	GA	GD	Pts
1	Sporting Cristal (C, O)	26	15	7	4	35	15	+20	37
2	Juan Aurich (O)	26	16	5	5	49	29	+20	37
3	Alianza Lima	26	15	6	5	54	29	+25	36

== See also ==
- Club Sporting Cristal
- 1968 Torneo Descentralizado
