= 1963 Peruvian Primera División =

Peruvian Primera División
- Season: 1963
- Dates: 11 August 1963 – 28 December 1963
- Champions: Alianza Lima (13th title)
- Runner up: Sporting Cristal
- Relegated: Mariscal Sucre
- 1964 Copa Libertadores: Alianza Lima
- Matches: 90
- Goals: 262 (2.91 per match)
- Top goalscorer: Pedro Pablo León (13 goals); Alejandro Guzmán (13 goals)

The 1963 season of the Peruvian Primera División, the top category of Peruvian football, was played by 10 teams. The national champions were Alianza Lima.

== Competition format ==
All teams faced each other in a double round-robin format, playing home and away matches. The team that accumulated the highest number of points at the end of the season was automatically crowned champion, while the team with the fewest points was relegated to the Peruvian Segunda División.

Two points were awarded for a win, one point for a draw, and no points for a loss.

== Teams ==
=== Team changes ===
| Promoted from 1962 Segunda División | Relegated from 1962 Primera División |
|---|---|
| ▲ Mariscal Sucre (1st) | ▼ Atlético Chalaco (10th) |

=== Stadia locations ===
| Team | City | Mannager |
|---|---|---|
| Alianza Lima | La Victoria, Lima | (Brazil) Jaime de Almeida |
| Centro Iqueño | Cercado de Lima | (Peru) Víctor Ramos |
| Ciclista Lima | Cercado de Lima | (Argentina) Roberto Aballay |
| Defensor Lima | Breña, Lima | (Peru) Marcos Calderón |
| Deportivo Municipal | Cercado de Lima | (Brazil) Juan Valdivieso |
| KDT Nacional | Callao | (Peru) José Chiarella |
| Mariscal Sucre | La Victoria, Lima | (Peru) Alfonso Huapaya |
| Sport Boys | Callao | (Brazil) José Gomes Nogueira |
| Sporting Cristal | Rímac, Lima | (Brazil) Didí |
| Universitario | Breña, Lima | (Paraguay) Miguel Ortega |

== League table ==
=== Standings ===
| Pos | Team | Pld | W | D | L | GF | GA | GD | Pts | Qualification or relegation |
|---|---|---|---|---|---|---|---|---|---|---|
| 1 | Alianza Lima (C) | 18 | 11 | 6 | 1 | 49 | 15 | +34 | 28 | 1964 Copa Libertadores |
| 2 | Sporting Cristal | 18 | 11 | 3 | 4 | 34 | 19 | +15 | 25 | |
| 3 | Universitario | 18 | 9 | 5 | 4 | 38 | 20 | +18 | 23 | |
| 4 | Sport Boys | 18 | 7 | 6 | 5 | 30 | 19 | +11 | 20 | |
| 5 | Centro Iqueño | 18 | 6 | 4 | 8 | 25 | 28 | −3 | 16 | |
| 6 | Defensor Lima | 18 | 7 | 2 | 9 | 15 | 37 | −22 | 16 | |
| 7 | KDT Nacional | 18 | 6 | 2 | 10 | 14 | 27 | −13 | 14 | |
| 8 | Deportivo Municipal | 18 | 5 | 4 | 9 | 20 | 30 | −10 | 14 | |
| 9 | Ciclista Lima | 18 | 5 | 3 | 10 | 16 | 27 | −11 | 13 | |
| 10 | Mariscal Sucre (R) | 18 | 5 | 1 | 12 | 21 | 42 | −21 | 11 | 1964 Segunda División |

(C) Champions; (R) Relegated

== Results ==
| Home \ Away | ALI | IQU | CIC | DLI | MUN | KDT | MSU | SBA | CRI | UNI |
|---|---|---|---|---|---|---|---|---|---|---|
| Alianza Lima | | 3–1 | 2–0 | 3–1 | 2–0 | 4–0 | 5–1 | 2–2 | 2–2 | 3–1 |
| Centro Iqueño | 1–5 | | 1–0 | 1–2 | 1–2 | 1–1 | 3–0 | 2–1 | 3–0 | 1–3 |
| Ciclista Lima | 2–2 | 0–0 | | 0–1 | 1–1 | 2–1 | 4–2 | 0–2 | 1–0 | 1–7 |
| Defensor Lima | 0–5 | 2–1 | 2–1 | | 2–1 | 2–1 | 1–0 | 0–4 | 0–1 | 1–1 |
| Deportivo Municipal | 0–0 | 2–1 | 0–1 | 3–1 | | 2–0 | 2–1 | 1–1 | 2–6 | 0–2 |
| KDT Nacional | 1–1 | 0–2 | 1–0 | 1–0 | 1–0 | | 2–0 | 3–1 | 0–2 | 0–3 |
| Mariscal Sucre | 0–7 | 1–1 | 1–0 | 6–0 | 2–1 | 2–1 | | 0–1 | 2–3 | 2–1 |
| Sport Boys | 0–0 | 1–2 | 1–0 | 5–0 | 1–1 | 3–0 | 4–1 | | 0–0 | 1–1 |
| Sporting Cristal | 1–2 | 3–1 | 2–1 | 3–0 | 4–2 | 0–1 | 1–0 | 2–1 | | 4–1 |
| Universitario | 2–1 | 2–2 | 1–2 | 0–0 | 2–1 | 2–0 | 5–0 | 4–1 | 0–0 | |

Updated to match(es) played on 1963. Source: Diario El Comercio, La Prensa and Crónica.
Legend: Blue = home team win; Yellow = draw; Red = away team win.

== Top scorers ==
| Rank | Player | Club | Goals |
|---|---|---|---|
| 1 | (Peru) Pedro Pablo León | Alianza Lima | 13 |
| 1 | (Peru) Alejandro Guzmán | Universitario | 13 |
| 2 | (Peru) Alejandro Zevallos | Centro Iqueño | 12 |
| 3 | (Peru) Alberto Gallardo | Sporting Cristal | 11 |
| 4 | (Peru) Héctor Valle | Alianza Lima | 10 |
| 5 | (Peru) Víctor Rostaing | Alianza Lima | 9 |
| 5 | (Peru) Pablo Zegarra | Alianza Lima | 9 |

== See also ==
- 1963 Campeonato de Apertura
- 1963 Peruvian Segunda División
