= 1968 Torneo Descentralizado =

Torneo Descentralizado
- Season: 1968
- Dates: 15 June 1968 – 15 January 1969
- Champions: Sporting Cristal; 3rd Primera División title
- Runner up: Juan Aurich
- Relegated: Carlos A. Mannucci; Mariscal Sucre
- 1969 Copa Libertadores: Sporting Cristal; Juan Aurich
- Matches: 184
- Goals: 515 (2.8 per match)
- Top goalscorer: Oswaldo Ramírez (26 goals)

The 1968 Torneo Descentralizado was the 52nd season of the highest division of Peruvian football. Carlos A. Mannucci of Trujillo made its debut in the first division in this season.

Sporting Cristal and Juan Aurich were tied on points at the end of the season. An extra match was played to determine first place and consequently the champion of the season. Sporting Cristal won the play-off and became national champions.

At the bottom of the league, Centro Iqueño and Mariscal Sucre tied on points, sharing thirteenth and fourteenth place. They also played an extra match to determine the team to face relegation. Centro Iqueño won the relegation play-off and Mariscal Sucre were relegated from the division. Carlos A. Mannucci were relegated as the worst placed team outside Lima and Callao.

== Teams ==
=== Team changes ===
Promoted from 1967 Segunda División	Promoted from 1968 Copa Perú	Relegated from 1967 Primera División
▲KDT Nacional (1st)	▲ Carlos A. Mannucci (1st)	▼ Deportivo Municipal (13th) ▼ Alfonso Ugarte de Chiclín (14th)

=== Stadia locations ===
Locations of the 1968 Primera División teams

Team	City
Alianza Lima	La Victoria, Lima
Atlético Grau	Piura
Carlos A. Mannucci	Trujillo
Centro Iqueño	Cercado de Lima
Defensor Arica	Breña, Lima
Defensor Lima	Breña, Lima
Juan Aurich	Chiclayo
KDT Nacional	Callao
Mariscal Sucre	La Victoria, Lima
Porvenir Miraflores	Miraflores, Lima
Octavio Espinosa	Ica
Sport Boys	Callao
Sporting Cristal	Rímac, Lima
Universitario	Breña, Lima

== League table ==
=== Standings ===
Pos	Team	Pld	W	D	L	GF	GA	GD	Pts	Qualification or relegation
1	Sporting Cristal (C, O)	26	15	7	4	35	15	+20	37	Title play-off
2	Juan Aurich	26	16	5	5	49	29	+20	37	Title play-off
3	Alianza Lima	26	15	6	5	54	29	+25	36	
4	Universitario	26	14	6	6	59	26	+33	34	
5	Octavio Espinosa	26	12	6	8	36	38	−2	30	
6	Defensor Lima	26	9	10	7	35	32	+3	28	
7	Atlético Grau	26	9	8	9	35	31	+4	26	
8	Sport Boys	26	9	7	10	44	36	+8	25	
9	Carlos A. Mannucci (R)	26	8	9	9	30	36	−6	25	1969 Copa Perú
10	Defensor Arica	26	5	11	10	31	44	−13	21	
11	KDT Nacional	26	6	7	13	28	42	−14	19	
12	Porvenir Miraflores	26	6	6	14	27	43	−16	18	
13	Centro Iqueño (O)	26	5	4	17	24	56	−32	14	Relegation play-off
14	Mariscal Sucre (R)	26	4	6	16	24	54	−30	14	Relegation play-off

(C) Champions; (O) Play-off winners; (R) Relegated

== Results ==
Home \ Away	ALI	GRA	CAM	CEN	ARI	DEF	AUR	KDT	SUC	OCT	POR	SBA	SCR	UNI
Alianza Lima		2–1	1–2	3–1	3–0	2–2	1–1	2–0	3–0	0–0	3–1	3–2	1–3	3–1
Atlético Grau	3–3		3–1	1–2	0–0	0–1	1–0	2–0	3–0	4–1	1–1	1–0	0–0	0–0
Carlos A. Mannucci	0–2	2–1		1–1	2–1	1–1	1–1	2–4	1–0	3–1	3–1	1–3	1–1	0–2
Centro Iqueño	1–0	1–3	2–1		1–3	0–2	0–1	1–3	0–0	0–0	2–3	3–2	0–1	1–4
Defensor Arica	3–3	0–0	2–2	2–1		1–1	3–2	1–4	2–2	1–1	1–1	1–1	1–2	1–4
Defensor Lima	0–2	0–1	3–2	3–0	0–0		1–1	2–1	0–4	0–1	2–0	0–0	0–1	2–6
Juan Aurich	4–1	3–1	1–0	3–0	3–0	3–1		2–3	2–1	3–1	1–0	1–1	1–2	3–2
KDT Nacional	0–3	1–1	0–0	1–1	3–1	0–5	1–2		1–2	2–2	0–0	1–1	0–1	1–0
Mariscal Sucre	0–4	0–0	2–2	1–3	1–2	3–4	0–3	1–0		1–2	0–2	1–1	1–1	0–5
Octavio Espinosa	1–3	3–1	0–1	1–0	1–1	2–2	1–2	1–0	2–0		3–1	2–6	2–1	1–0
Porvenir Miraflores	0–2	1–2	0–0	4–2	2–0	0–2	2–3	0–0	2–0	2–3		1–3	1–0	1–1
Sport Boys	3–2	4–2	0–1	6–1	2–1	0–0	1–2	2–1	2–4	0–2	3–0		1–2	0–2
Sporting Cristal	0–0	1–0	3–0	3–0	1–0	0–0	1–1	3–0	2–0	0–2	3–0	1–0		2–2
Universitario	0–2	4–3	0–0	4–0	1–3	1–1	3–0	4–1	5–0	4–0	3–1	0–0	1–0	

Updated to match(es) played on 1968. Source: Rsssf.org Peru 1968
Legend: Blue = home team win; Yellow = draw; Red = away team win.

== Relegation play-off ==
15 January 1969
18:00

Centro Iqueño	1–0	Mariscal Sucre
Roberto Reaño 43'

Estadio Nacional, Lima
Referee: Carlos Rivero

== Title play-off ==
15 January 1969
20:00

Sporting Cristal	2–1	Juan Aurich
Alberto Gallardo 56' 60'		Próspero Merino 80'

Estadio Nacional, Lima
Referee: César Orozco

== Top scorers ==
Player	Nationality	Goals	Club
Oswaldo Ramírez	Peru	26	Sport Boys

== See also ==
- 1968 Peruvian Segunda División
- 1968 Copa Perú
