= Sport Chorrillos =

Peruvian football club

- Full name: Club Sport Chorrillos
- League: Copa Perú
- 2017: Departamental Stage
Home colours

Sport Chorrillos is a Peruvian football club, playing in the city of Querecotillo, Sullana, Piura, Peru.

== History ==
In the 1968 Copa Perú, the club qualified to the Final Stage, with the Aurora Chancayllo of Chancay, Carlos A. Mannucci of Trujillo, Cienciano of the Cusco, FBC Melgar of Arequipa and Colegio Nacional de Iquitos. In the final stage, the club was runner-up.

== Honours ==
=== National ===
- Copa Perú: 0

Runner-up (1): 1968

- Liga Departamental de Piura: 1

Winners (2): 1968, 2019

== See also ==
- List of football clubs in Peru
- Peruvian football league system
