= 1964 Peruvian Segunda División =

Peruvian Segunda División
- Season: 1964
- Dates: 20 July 1964 – 15 November 1964
- Champions: Defensor Arica
- Runner up: Porvenir Miraflores
- Relegated: Unidad Vecinal Nº3
- Matches: 90
- Goals: 291 (3.23 per match)
- Top goalscorer: Hugo Ocsas; Víctor Montoya; Napoleón Rodríguez (13 goals each)

The 1964 Peruvian Segunda División, the second division of Peruvian football (soccer), was played by 10 teams. The tournament winner, Defensor Arica was promoted to the 1965 Peruvian Primera División.

The entire tournament was played at the Estadio Fray Martín de Porres in Lima.

== Competition format ==
All teams faced each other in a double round-robin format, playing home and away matches. The team that accumulated the highest number of points at the end of the season was automatically crowned champion and promoted to the Peruvian Primera División, while the team with the fewest points was relegated to the Ligas Provinciales de Lima y Callao.

Two points were awarded for a win, one point for a draw, and no points for a loss.

== Teams ==
=== Team changes ===
Promoted from 1963 Liguilla de Promoción	Promoted to 1964 Primera División	Relegated from 1963 Primera División	Relegated to 1964 Liga de los Balnearios del Sur
▲ADO (1st)	▲ Carlos Concha (1st)	▼ Mariscal Sucre (10th)	▼ Association Chorrillos (10th)

=== Stadia and locations ===
Team	City
ADO	Callao
Atlético Chalaco	Callao
Atlético Lusitania	Cercado de Lima
Defensor Arica	Breña, Lima
Íntimos de La Legua	Callao
Juventud Gloria	Jesús María, Lima
Mariscal Sucre	La Victoria, Lima
Porvenir Miraflores	Miraflores, Lima
Unidad Vecinal Nº3	Cercado de Lima
Unión América	Cercado de Lima

== League table ==
=== Standings ===
Pos	Team	Pld	W	D	L	GF	GA	GD	Pts	Qualification or relegation
1	Defensor Arica (C)	18	14	1	3	40	14	+26	29	1965 Primera División
2	Porvenir Miraflores	18	11	3	4	39	24	+15	25	
3	Atlético Chalaco	18	10	3	5	35	23	+12	23	
4	Mariscal Sucre	18	8	4	6	33	29	+4	20	
5	Íntimos de La Legua	18	6	8	4	26	25	+1	20	
6	Unión América	18	7	2	9	29	32	−3	16	
7	Atlético Lusitania	18	5	5	8	26	34	−8	15	
8	ADO	18	5	3	10	17	35	−18	13	
9	Juventud Gloria	18	3	6	9	21	38	−17	12	
10	Unidad Vecinal Nº3 (R)	18	3	1	14	16	37	−21	7	1965 Liga Provincial del Callao

(C) Champions; (R) Relegated

== Results ==
Home \ Away	ADO	CHA	LUS	DEF	INT	JUV	MSU	POR	UVE	UAM
ADO		0–2	1–0	1–5	2–3	2–0	0–3	2–5	3–1	1–0
Atlético Chalaco	4–0		0–3	0–3	1–0	1–3	4–2	4–0	5–0	3–2
Atlético Lusitania	3–0	1–1		0–3	4–4	1–2	2–4	0–3	2–1	2–1
Defensor Arica	2–0	0–1	4–1		1–1	8–0	4–1	2–3	2–1	1–0
Íntimos de La Legua	0–0	0–1	1–1	1–3		2–0	2–2	2–1	W.O.	2–2
Juventud Gloria	1–1	2–2	3–3	0–1	0–2		0–2	1–1	2–1	4–4
Mariscal Sucre	3–3	2–1	0–2	2–1	2–2	1–1		0–1	4–1	2–1
Porvenir Miraflores	2–0	3–1	0–0	1–3	2–2	2–0	3–1		5–1	2–1
Unidad Vecinal Nº3	0–1	0–0	3–1	1–3	0–2	2–1	0–2	0–2		4–0
Unión América	1–0	2–4	3–0	0–3	3–0	2–1	1–0	4–3	2–0	

Updated to match(es) played on 1964. Source: Diario El Comercio, La Prensa and Crónica.
Legend: Blue = home team win; Yellow = draw; Red = away team win.

== Cuadrangular de Ascenso a Segunda División ==
Atlético Sicaya, as champions of the 1964 Liga Provincial del Callao; Atlético Banfield, as champions of the 1964 Liga Provincial del Lima; Association Chorrillos, as champions of the 1964 Liga de los Balnearios del Sur; and Deportivo Bancoper, as champions of the 1964 Liga Distrital de San Isidrio, were to compete in a final four (round-robin) to determine promotion to the 1965 Segunda División.

=== Standings ===
Pos	Team	Pld	W	D	L	GF	GA	GD	Pts	Qualification or relegation	SIC	BAN	BCO	ACH
1	Atlético Sicaya	3	3	0	0	9	4	+5	6	1965 Segunda División		5–3		2–1
2	Atlético Banfield	3	2	0	1	7	6	+1	4				2–1	
3	Deportivo Bancoper	3	0	1	2	2	5	−3	1		0–2			
4	Association Chorrillos	3	0	1	2	2	5	−3	1			0–2	1–1	

Legend: Blue = home team win; Yellow = draw; Red = away team win.

Atlético Sicaya earned promotion to the 1965 Segunda División.

== Torneo Equipos de Reserva ==
Alongside the Second Division championship, a reserve teams tournament was held, featuring the reserve teams of the participating clubs.

Juventud Gloria were crowned tournament champions after defeating Unidad Vecinal 4–2. The goals for the winning side were scored by Arregui (a brace), Corzo, and Ayala. The championship-winning lineup was: L. Lavalle; Gervaso, J. Corzo, Castillo, Torrey; Sánchez, D. Corzo, Chirinos; Revatta, Ayala, and Arregui.

== See also ==
- 1964 Peruvian Primera División
- 1964 Torneo Relámpago
