= Luis Calderón (Colombian footballer) =

Colombian footballer (born 1990)

Personal information
- Full name: Luis Antonio Calderón Orozco
- Date of birth: 2 June 1990 (age 36)
- Place of birth: Cali, Colombia
- Height: 1.82 m (6 ft 0 in)
- Position: Defender

Senior career*
Years	Team	Apps	(Gls)
2011–2016	Deportivo Cali	82	(2)
2017	Deportivo Municipal	37	(0)
- * Club domestic league appearances and goals

Luis Antonio Calderón Orozco (born 2 June 1990) is a Colombian former professional footballer who played as defender.
