= Pedro Pablo León =

Peruvian footballer (1943–2020)

Perico León
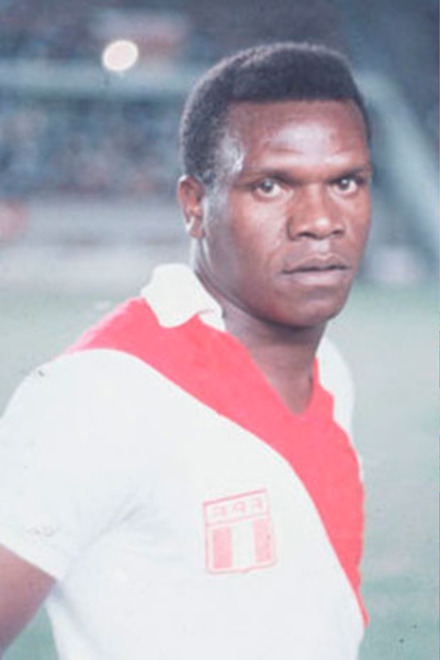

Personal information
- Full name: Pedro Pablo León García
- Date of birth: 29 June 1943
- Place of birth: Lima, Peru
- Date of death: 9 May 2020 (aged 76)
- Place of death: Lima
- Height: 1.75 m (5 ft 9 in)
- Position: Striker

Senior career*
Years	Team	Apps	(Gls)
1961–1970	Alianza Lima	227	(104)
1971–1972	Barcelona SC	49	(24)
1973–1974	Deportivo Galicia	33	(16)
1975	Deportivo Municipal	14	(7)
1976	Juan Aurich	9	(4)
Total		332	(155)

International career
1963–1973	Peru	49	(15)
- * Club domestic league appearances and goals

Pedro Pablo León García (29 June 1943 – 9 May 2020), also known as Perico León, was a Peruvian professional footballer who played as a striker.

== Career ==
León made 49 appearances for the Peru national team between 1963 and 1973. He then started in the 1970 FIFA World Cup for the Peru national football team, along with Teófilo Cubillas, Roberto Challe and Hugo Sotil.

At club level, León played most of his career for Alianza Lima in Peru. He also played in Ecuador for Barcelona Sporting Club and in Venezuela for Deportivo Galicia.

== Playing style ==
Perico León was a striker with the ability to effectively score with his head. His ability to create technical plays often allowed him to go back and aid his teammates, thus making him quite a complete player with the possibility to serve as both a midfielder and a forward.

== Personal life ==
He lived in Miami, Florida, and enjoyed watching his grandson Brian Jair León play soccer for the Varsity high school soccer team in Nevada. His grandson is following in his grandfather's footsteps of becoming a professional footballer.

== Career statistics ==
=== International goals ===
Scores and results table. Peru's goal tally first:

List of international goals scored by Pedro Pablo León
No.	Date	Venue	Opponent	Score	Result	Competition
1.	17 March 1963	Estadio Hernando Siles, La Paz, Bolivia	Ecuador	1–1	2–1	1963 South American Championship
2.	21 March 1963	Estadio Hernando Siles, La Paz, Bolivia	Bolivia	1–2	2–3	1963 South American Championship
3.	2 June 1965	Estadio Brígido Iriarte, Caracas, Venezuela	Venezuela	3–1	6–3	1966 FIFA World Cup qualification
4.	2 June 1965	Estadio Brígido Iriarte, Caracas, Venezuela	Venezuela	4–2	6–3	1966 FIFA World Cup qualification
5.	2 June 1965	Estadio Brígido Iriarte, Caracas, Venezuela	Venezuela	5–2	6–3	1966 FIFA World Cup qualification
6.	14 July 1968	Estadio Nacional, Lima, Peru	Brazil	1–0	3–4	Friendly
7.	14 July 1968	Estadio Nacional, Lima, Peru	Brazil	2–0	3–4	Friendly
8.	9 May 1969	Estadio El Campín, Bogotá, Colombia	Colombia	3–1	3–1	Friendly
9.	20 May 1969	Estadio Azteca, Mexico City, Mexico	Mexico	1–0	1–0	Friendly
10.	27 June 1969	Estadio Nacional, Lima, Peru	Uruguay	1–0	1–0	Friendly
11.	18 July 1969	Estadio Nacional, Lima, Peru	Paraguay	2–0	2–1	Friendly
12.	3 August 1969	Estadio Nacional, Lima, Peru	Argentina	1–0	1–0	1970 FIFA World Cup qualification
13.	18 March 1970	Estadio León, León, Mexico	Mexico	1–0	3–3	Friendly
14.	18 March 1970	Estadio León, León, Mexico	Mexico	3–3	3–3	Friendly
15.	18 April 1970	Estadio Nacional, Lima, Peru	Uruguay	3–0	4–2	Friendly

== Honours ==
Season	Club	Title
1962	Alianza Lima	Peruvian League
1963	Alianza Lima	Peruvian League
1965	Alianza Lima	Peruvian League
1971	Barcelona SC	Serie A de Ecuador
1974	Deportivo Galicia	Primera División Venezolana

=== Individual awards ===
- Peruvian League: Top Scorer 1963, 1967
