= 1968 Copa Perú =

Copa Perú
- Season: 1968
- Champions: Carlos A. Mannucci
- Runner up: Sport Chorrillos
- Matches: 15
- Goals: 38 (2.53 per match)
- Top goalscorer: Nilo Castañeda (4)
- Highest scoring: Carlos A. Mannucci 4–0 CNI; Sport Chorrillos 2–2 Cienciano; Only National Stage taken into consideration

The 1968 Copa Perú season (Spanish: Copa Perú 1968), the promotion tournament of Peruvian football.

In this tournament after many qualification rounds, each one of the 24 departments in which Peru is politically divided, qualified a team. Those teams plus the team relegated from First Division on the last year, enter in two more rounds and finally 6 of them qualify for the Final round, staged in Lima (the capital).

The winning team, Carlos A. Mannucci, was promoted to play in 1968 Torneo Descentralizado.

== Teams ==
=== Team changes ===
Relegated from 1967 Primera División	Promoted to 1968 Primera División
▼ Alfonso Ugarte de Chiclín (14th)	▲ Alfonso Ugarte de Chiclín (1st) ▲ Octavio Espinosa (2nd) ▲ Juan Aurich (3rd)

== Departmental Stage ==
The following list shows the teams that qualified for the Regional Stage.

Department	Team	Location
Amazonas	Nor Oriente	Chachapoyas
Ancash	José Gálvez	Chimbote
Apurímac	Miguel Grau	Abancay
Arequipa	Melgar	Arequipa
Ayacucho	UNSCH	Ayacucho
Cajamarca	Deportivo Bracamoros	Jaén
Cusco	Cienciano	Cusco
Huancavelica	UDA	Huancavelica
Huánuco	León de Huánuco	Huánuco
Ica	Víctor Bielich	Pisco
Junín	Universitario de Tarma	Tarma
La Libertad	Carlos A. Mannucci	Trujillo
La Libertad	Alfonso Ugarte de Chiclín	Trujillo

Department	Team	Location
Lambayeque	San Lorenzo	Chiclayo
Lima	Aurora Chancayllo	Huaral
Loreto	CNI	Iquitos
Madre de Dios	Deportivo Maldonado	Puerto Maldonado
Moquegua	Atlético Huracán	Moquegua
Pasco	Estudiantil Carrión	Pasco
Piura	Sport Chorrillos	Talara
Puno	Unión Carolina	Puno
San Martín	Unión Progreso	Moyobamba
Tacna	Coronel Bolognesi	Tacna
Tumbes	Sport Tumbes	Tumbes

== Regional stage ==
=== Región Norte A ===
Deportivo Bracamoros failed to appear for its match against San Lorenzo and was subsequently disqualified from the remaining fixtures, being handed 1–0 losses.

==== Standings ====
Pos	Team	Pld	W	D	L	GF	GA	GD	Pts	Qualification	CHO	SLO	TUM	BRA
1	Sport Chorrillos	6	5	0	1	17	3	+14	10	Final stage		2–0	3–1	9–0
2	San Lorenzo	6	4	0	2	15	6	+9	8		0–1		6–1	4–1
3	Sport Tumbes	6	3	0	3	8	14	−6	6		2–1	1–4		2–0
4	Deportivo Bracamoros	6	0	0	6	1	18	−17	0		0–1	0–1	0–1	

Source: Diario La Crónica
Legend: Blue = home team win; Yellow = draw; Red = away team win.

=== Región Norte B ===
==== Standings ====
Pos	Team	Pld	W	D	L	GF	GA	GD	Pts	Qualification	CAM	LEO	GAL	EST
1	Carlos A. Mannucci	6	3	2	1	12	5	+7	8	Final stage		0–0	4–1	4–0
2	León de Huánuco	6	1	4	1	5	4	+1	6		1–1		1–1	3–1
3	José Gálvez	6	2	1	3	6	10	−4	5		1–2	1–0		1–0
4	Estudiantil Carrión	6	2	1	3	6	10	−4	5		2–1	0–0	3–1	

Source: Diario La Crónica 1968
Legend: Blue = home team win; Yellow = draw; Red = away team win.

=== Region Oriente ===
==== Standings ====
Pos	Team	Pld	W	D	L	GF	GA	GD	Pts	Qualification	CNI	ORI	PRO
1	CNI	3	3	0	0	11	3	+8	6	Final stage		6–1	n.p.
2	Nor Oriente	4	1	1	2	5	10	−5	3		2–3		2–1
3	Unión Progreso	3	0	1	2	1	4	−3	1		0–2	0–0	

Source: Diario La Crónica
Legend: Blue = home team win; Yellow = draw; Red = away team win.

=== Region Centro ===
==== Standings ====
Pos	Team	Pld	W	D	L	GF	GA	GD	Pts	Qualification	CHA	BIE	UNI	UDA
1	Aurora Chancayllo	6	4	1	1	16	7	+9	9	Final stage		4–1	5–1	2–0
2	Víctor Bielich	6	3	2	1	8	5	+3	8		2–0		3–0	2–1
3	Universitario de Tarma	5	1	2	2	5	11	−6	4		3–3	0–0		1–0
4	UDA	5	0	1	4	1	7	−6	1		0–2	0–0	n.p.	

Source: Diario La Crónica 1968
Legend: Blue = home team win; Yellow = draw; Red = away team win.

=== Region Sureste ===
Region Sureste includes qualified teams from Apurímac, Ayacucho, Cusco, Madre de Dios and Puno region. All matches were played in Cusco in a single round-robin format.

Unión Carolina refused to participate due to its disagreement with the decision to have all matches played in Cusco.

==== Standings ====
Pos	Team	Pld	W	D	L	GF	GA	GD	Pts	Qualification	CIE	UNS	GRA	MAL
1	Cienciano	3	2	1	0	9	2	+7	5	Final stage		4–1	1–1	
2	UNSCH	3	2	0	1	8	4	+4	4				1–0	6–0
3	Miguel Grau	3	1	1	1	3	2	+1	3					2–0
4	Deportivo Maldonado	3	0	0	3	0	12	−12	0		0–4			

Source: Diario La Crónica
Legend: Blue = home team win; Yellow = draw; Red = away team win.

=== Region Sur ===
Region Sur includes qualified teams from Arequipa, Moquegua and Tacna region.

==== Standings ====
Pos	Team	Pld	W	D	L	GF	GA	GD	Pts	Qualification	MEL	BOL	HUR
1	Melgar	4	2	2	0	10	2	+8	6	Final stage		2–1	7–0
2	Coronel Bolognesi	4	1	1	2	5	6	−1	3		1–1		2–0
3	Atlético Huracán	4	1	1	2	3	10	−7	3		0–0	3–1	

Source: Diario La Crónica
Legend: Blue = home team win; Yellow = draw; Red = away team win.

== Final stage ==
=== Standings ===
Pos	Team	Pld	W	D	L	GF	GA	GD	Pts	Promotion
1	Carlos A. Mannucci (C)	5	4	0	1	10	4	+6	8	1968 Primera División
2	Sport Chorrillos	5	3	1	1	9	5	+4	7	
3	CNI	5	2	1	2	4	8	−4	5	
4	Cienciano	5	1	2	2	6	8	−2	4	
5	Melgar	5	1	1	3	5	7	−2	3	
6	Aurora Chancayllo	5	1	1	3	4	6	−2	3	

(C) Champions

=== Results ===
==== Round 1 ====
28 April 1968	Melgar	3–0	Cienciano	Nacional, Lima

28 April 1968	Carlos A. Mannucci	4–0	CNI	Nacional, Lima

28 April 1968	Sport Chorrillos	1–0	Aurora Chancayllo	Nacional, Lima

==== Round 2 ====
1 May 1968	Cienciano	2–0	CNI	Nacional, Lima

1 May 1968	Aurora Chancayllo	2–1	Melgar	Nacional, Lima

1 May 1968	Sport Chorrillos	1–0	Carlos A. Mannucci	Nacional, Lima

==== Round 3 ====
5 May 1968	CNI	2–1	Aurora Chancayllo	Nacional, Lima

5 May 1968	Carlos A. Mannucci	2–1	Cienciano	Nacional, Lima

5 May 1968	Sport Chorrillos	3–0	Melgar	Nacional, Lima

==== Round 4 ====
8 May 1968	CNI	1–1	Melgar	Nacional, Lima

8 May 1968	Carlos A. Mannucci	1–0	Aurora Chancayllo	Nacional, Lima

8 May 1968	Sport Chorrillos	2–2	Cienciano	Nacional, Lima

==== Round 5 ====
11 May 1968	Cienciano	1–1	Aurora Chancayllo	Nacional, Lima

11 May 1968	Carlos A. Mannucci	1–0	Melgar	Nacional, Lima

11 May 1968	CNI	1–0	Sport Chorrillos	Nacional, Lima

== See also ==
- 1968 Torneo Descentralizado
- 1968 Peruvian Segunda División
