= Próspero Merino =

Peruvian footballer (1943–1981)

Personal information
- Full name: Próspero Merino Mogollón
- Date of birth: 1943
- Place of birth: Morropón (Piura), Peru
- Date of death: 1 August 1981 (aged 37–38)
- Place of death: Piura, Peru
- Height: 1.70 m (5 ft 7 in)
- Position: Forward

Senior career*
| Years | Team | Apps | (Gls) |
| 1967–1969 | Juan Aurich | | |
| 1970–1971 | Sporting Cristal | | |
| 1972 | Unión Tumán | | |
| 1973 | Juan Aurich | | |
| 1974–1975 | Carlos A. Mannucci | | |
- * Club domestic league appearances and goals

Próspero Merino Mogollón (1943–1981) was a Peruvian footballer who played as a forward. He is considered one of the most outstanding players of Juan Aurich of Chiclayo.

== Biography ==
=== Playing career ===
With Juan Aurich, Próspero Merino became Peruvian league runner-up in the 1968 season. The following year, he participated in the Copa Libertadores (the club's first ever), scoring four goals in eight matches.

In 1970, he signed with Sporting Cristal and won the Peruvian league title that same year. He played in the 1971 Copa Libertadores with Sporting Cristal (three matches without scoring a goal). Returning to Juan Aurich in 1973, he finished his career with Carlos A. Mannucci of Trujillo in 1975.

=== Death ===
He was murdered in Piura on 1 August 1981, under unclear circumstances. A club in his hometown is named after him: Próspero Merino de Morropón.

== Honours ==
Sporting Cristal

- Torneo Descentralizado: 1970
