= Mariscal Castilla District, Chachapoyas =

Coordinates: 6°18′00″S 77°25′01″W

Mariscal Castilla
- District
- Interactive map of Mariscal Castilla
- Country: Peru
- Region: Amazonas
- Province: Chachapoyas
- Founded: September 6, 1904
- Capital: Duraznopampa

Government
  - Mayor: Pedro Tuesta Culqui

Area
  - Total: 83.58 km^{2} (32.27 sq mi)
- Elevation: 2,200 m (7,200 ft)

Population (2005 census)
  - Total: 1,252
  - Density: 14.98/km^{2} (38.80/sq mi)
- Time zone: UTC-5 (PET)
- UBIGEO: 010113

Mariscal Castilla (Spanish mariscal marshal) is a district of the Chachapoyas Province, Peru.
