= Luis Calderón (Peruvian footballer) =

Peruvian footballer (1929–2022)

Personal information
- Full name: Luis Calderón Mendiolaza
- Date of birth: 17 June 1929
- Place of birth: Lima, Peru
- Date of death: 24 May 2022 (aged 92)
- Position: Midfielder

Senior career*
Years	Team	Apps	(Gls)
1945	Carlos Concha		
1946–1957	Sport Boys		
1958–1963	Universitario		
1964	KDT Nacional		

International career
- Peru
- * Club domestic league appearances and goals

Luis Calderón Mendiolaza (17 June 1929 – 24 May 2022) was a Peruvian footballer who played as a midfielder for Carlos Concha, Sport Boys, Universitario and KDT Nacional, as well as the Peru national team.
