= Defensor Arica =

- Full name: Defensor Arica
- Nicknames: Los Celestes; El Equipo desmantelado
- Founded: 18 December 1929; 96 years ago
- Ground: Estadio Nacional; Lima, Peru
- Capacity: 45,000

Defensor Arica was a Peruvian football club based in Breña, Lima. The club was founded in 1929 and reached the Peruvian Second Division in 1947. They were subsequently promoted to the first division in 1964. Their greatest achievement was second place in the national league in 1969 and consequently in 1970 they played in the Copa Libertadores. Two years later, Defensor Arica was relegated.

== History ==
Initially founded as Deportivo Defensor Arica on December 18, 1929, the club was established in a tenement on Colonial Avenue in Breña. In 1947, it earned promotion to the Peruvian Segunda División from the Liga Regional de Lima y Callao.

In 1964, Defensor Arica secured promotion to the 1965 Peruvian Primera División (then limited to Lima and Callao) after thrashing Juventud Gloria 8–0 to win the Second Division title. The championship was clinched on November 14, 1964, at the San Martín de Porres Stadium, marking its only promotion to the top flight. That day, the starting lineup featured Ottorino Sartor in goal; Pablo Villaverde, Rafael Rosas, and Carlos García in defense; “La Lora” Gutiérrez and Anselmo Ruíz in midfield; and Víctor Montoya, Genaro Barrera, “El Cholo” Ocsas, Juan Nakajata, and Enrique Sánchez in attack. Jaime Diez Canseco also came on as a substitute, and the club was presided over by Nicolini.

In 1969, the club achieved its greatest accomplishment, finishing as runners-up and qualifying for the Copa Libertadores. In 1970, it competed in the tournament alongside Universitario, as Peruvian champions, and Ecuadorian sides América de Quito and LDU Quito. Defensor Arica finished third in its group and was eliminated. The team was managed during this successful period by the legendary coach Benicio José Acosta Barreiro, who led the club from 1968 until the end of the 1970 season.

In 1972, the club fielded a youthful squad—dubbed “the dismantled team” by the press—in which Jesús Lavalle stood out. That year, it was relegated, and with the subsequent dissolution of the Second Division, it returned to its league of origin. However, after two years, its directors stopped registering the club, leading to its disappearance.

== Statistics and results in First Division ==
=== League history ===
| Season | Div. | Pos. | Pl. | W | D | L | GF | GA | P | Notes |
|---|---|---|---|---|---|---|---|---|---|---|
| 1965 | 1st | 3 | 22 | 11 | 4 | 7 | 36 | 27 | 26 | 3/10 Regular season |
| 1966 | 1st | 9 | 26 | 10 | 8 | 8 | 31 | 25 | 28 | 9/14 Regular season |
| 1966 | 1st | 10 | 26 | 7 | 7 | 12 | 30 | 40 | 21 | 10/14 Regular season |
| 1967 | 1st | 5 | 26 | 13 | 7 | 6 | 37 | 23 | 33 | 5/14 Regular season |
| 1968 | 1st | 10 | 26 | 5 | 11 | 10 | 31 | 44 | 21 | 10/14 Regular season |
| 1969 | 1st | 2 | 18 | 7 | 8 | 3 | 26 | 15 | 22 | 2/14 Regular season |
| 1970 | 1st | 3 | 32 | 15 | 9 | 8 | 43 | 30 | 65 | 3/14 Regular season |
| 1971 | 1st | 12 | 30 | 8 | 8 | 14 | 30 | 46 | 24 | 12/16 Regular season |
| 1972 | 1st | 16 | 30 | 4 | 8 | 18 | 24 | 61 | 16 | 16/16 Regular season |

== Honours ==
=== Senior titles ===
Keys

- Record
- ^{(s)} Shared record

| Type | Competition | Titles | Runner-up | Winning years | Runner-up years |
|---|---|---|---|---|---|
| National (League) | Primera División | — | 1 | — | 1969 |
| National (League) | Segunda División | 1 | — | 1964 | — |
| Regional (League) | Primera División Regional de Lima y Callao | 1 | — | 1947 | — |
| Regional (League) | Segunda División Regional de Lima y Callao | 1 | — | 1944 Serie A | — |
| Regional (League) | Tercera División Regional de Lima y Callao | 1 | — | 1941 | — |
| Regional (League) | Segunda División Amateur de Lima | 1 | — | 1940 Serie B | — |
| Regional (League) | Tercera División Amateur de Lima | 1 | — | 1936 Zona Este | — |

== Performance in CONMEBOL competitions ==
- Copa Libertadores: 1 appearance

1970: First Round

=== Group 4 ===
| Pos | Team | Pld | W | D | L | GF | GA | GD | Pts | Qualification | (Peru) UNI | (Ecuador) LDU | (Peru) DEF | (Ecuador) CDA |
|---|---|---|---|---|---|---|---|---|---|---|---|---|---|---|
| 1 | (Peru) Universitario | 6 | 4 | 1 | 1 | 11 | 4 | +7 | 9 | Qualified to the Second Phase | | 2–0 | 2–1 | 3–0 |
| 2 | (Ecuador) LDU Quito | 6 | 3 | 1 | 2 | 10 | 6 | +4 | 7 | Qualified to the Second Phase | 2–0 | | 1–2 | 4–1 |
| 3 | (Peru) Defensor Arica | 6 | 1 | 3 | 2 | 5 | 6 | −1 | 5 | | 1–1 | 0–0 | | 0–1 |
| 4 | (Ecuador) América de Quito | 6 | 1 | 1 | 4 | 4 | 14 | −10 | 3 | | 0–3 | 1–3 | 1–1 | |

== See also ==
- List of football clubs in Peru
- Peruvian football league system
