= Marcos Calderón =

Peruvian football manager (1928–1987)

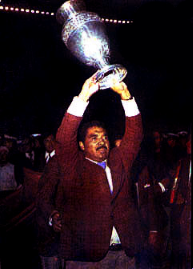
- Calderón holding the Copa América trophy in 1975

Personal information
- Full name: Marcos Calderón Medrano
- Date of birth: 11 July 1928
- Place of birth: Lima, Peru
- Date of death: 8 December 1987 (aged 59)
- Place of death: Pacific Ocean, off Callao (Peru)
- Position: Midfielder

Senior career*
Years	Team	Apps	(Gls)
194?–1951	Carlos Concha		
1951–1956	Sport Boys		

Managerial career
- 1958–1962: Sport Boys
- 1961: Peru
- 1963: Defensor Lima
- 1964–1968: Universitario
- 1965: Peru
- 1967: Peru
- 1969–1971: Defensor Arica
- 1972–1974: Sporting Cristal
- 1974–1976: Alianza Lima
- 1975: Peru
- 1977-1978: Peru
- 1978–1979: Barcelona S.C.
- 1979–1981: Sporting Cristal
- 1980: Peru
- 1981: Tigres UANL
- 1981–1982: Deportivo Municipal
- 1983: Deportivo Táchira
- 1984: Sport Boys
- 1985–1986: Universitario
- 1987: Juventud La Joya
- 1987: Alianza Lima
- * Club domestic league appearances and goals

Marcos Calderón Medrano (11 July 1928 – 8 December 1987) was a Peruvian football coach and player.

Nicknamed El Oso (the bear) or El Chueco (the crooked because of his bowed feet), this former Sport Boys midfielder remains the most decorated coach in the history of the Peruvian league with ten titles.

He managed Peru six times, winning the 1975 Copa América and leading the Blanquirroja (the Red and Whites) to the 1978 World Cup. To this day, he is the only Peruvian coach to have qualified the Peruvian national team for a World Cup. He died in a plane crash on 8 December 1987, along with the entire Alianza Lima team.

== Playing career ==
Compared to his successful coaching career, his playing career remains relatively modest with only two club experiences, at Carlos Concha, then at Sport Boys where he reunited with his cousin Luis Calderón and won the first professional championship of Peru in 1951.

== Coaching career ==
=== Club ===
Just two years after retiring as a player, Marcos Calderón replaced Dan Georgiadis as manager of Sport Boys and won the championship in 1958, his first title as a coach, and in his very first year in charge. This inaugural success set the tone for his coaching career, which was laden with titles (ten with his club and one with the national team), to the point that he was nicknamed Don Títulos (Mr. Titles) by Pocho Rospigliosi, a famous Peruvian sports journalist.

Indeed, besides Sport Boys – where he won a second championship in 1984 – Calderón distinguished himself at the three biggest clubs in Peru: Universitario de Deportes (champions in 1964, 1966, 1967 and 1985), Sporting Cristal (champions in 1972, 1979 and 1980) and Alianza Lima (champions in 1975). With the latter club, he reached the semi-finals of the Copa Libertadores in 1976.

=== Peru national team ===
A Copa América winner in 1975, Marcos Calderón experienced both highs and lows with the Peruvian national team. Replacing György Orth in 1961, he led La Blanquirroja (The Red and Whites) during the 1962 World Cup qualifiers, a first experience that proved unsuccessful, as the Peruvians were eliminated by a Colombian team that was considered inferior on paper. This did not prevent the Peruvian Football Federation from recalling him in 1965, only to see another disappointing performance from the Incas, who were overtaken by Uruguay in the 1966 World Cup qualifiers.

After a third return to the Peruvian bench in 1967, Marcos Calderón enjoyed greater success in the 1970s, culminating in the aforementioned 1975 Copa América victory, followed by qualification for the 1978 World Cup in Argentina, where Peru reached the second round. His last experience in charge of Peru was in 1980 (only one match managed).

=== Alianza Lima air disaster ===
Calderón, coach of Alianza Lima in 1987, perished with his team on 8 December 1987, off the coast of Callao when the plane carrying them crashed into the sea, an air crash that left a lasting mark on the Peruvian national consciousness. Seventeen days after the accident, his decomposing body was found on a beach near Huacho, a town 150 km north of Lima. His son, "Marquitos" Calderón, was able to identify his father's body by his bowed feet.

== Honours ==
=== Player ===
Sport Boys

- Peruvian Primera División: 1951

=== Manager ===
Sport Boys

- Peruvian Primera División (2): 1958, 1984

Universitario de Deportes

- Peruvian Primera División (4): 1964, 1966, 1967, 1985

Sporting Cristal

- Peruvian Primera División (3): 1972, 1979, 1980

Alianza Lima

- Peruvian Primera División: 1975

Peru

- Copa América: 1975

== Statistics (manager) ==
- 724 matches managed in the Peruvian First Division (all clubs combined).
- 51 matches managed for the Peruvian national team.
