= Juan Honores =

Peruvian footballer and manager (1915–1990)

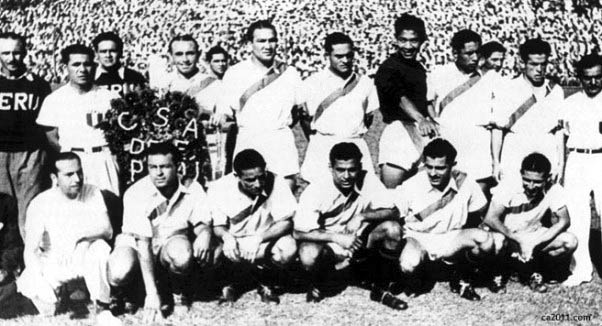
- Honores (4th standing, dark jersey) and the Peruvian team 1939 South American champions.

Personal information
- Full name: Juan Honores Mostejo
- Date of birth: 4 March 1915
- Place of birth: Ascope, Peru
- Date of death: 9 June 1990 (aged 75)
- Place of death: Lima, Peru
- Position: Goalkeeper

Senior career*
Years	Team	Apps	(Gls)
?–1935	Alfonso Ugarte (Chiclín)		
1935–1940	Universitario		
1941–1943	Newell's Old Boys	77	(0)
1944–1945	Platense	12	(0)
1949	Centro Iqueño		

International career
1937–1942	Peru	19	(0)

Managerial career
- 1949: Centro Iqueño (player-coach)
- 1960–1962: Sporting Cristal
- 1964: Deportivo Municipal
- 1965–1966: Defensor Lima
- 1967: Atlético Grau
- 1968: Carlos A. Mannucci
- 1969: Atlético Grau
- 1970: Sport Boys
- 1971: José Gálvez
- 1972: Juan Aurich
- 1973: Atlético Torino
- 1976: Sporting Cristal
- 1977: Deportivo Junín
Medal record
Men's football
Representing Peru
Copa América
Winner	1939 Lima
- * Club domestic league appearances and goals

Juan Honores Mostejo (Ascope, 4 March 1915 – Lima, 9 June 1990) was a Peruvian professional footballer who played as goalkeeper before coming manager.

== Playing career ==
=== Club career ===
Nicknamed El Chueco (the crooked one), Juan Honores first came to prominence on November 10, 1935, during a friendly match between his team, Alfonso Ugarte de Chiclín, and Sport Boys (1–1 draw). His performances in goal for Alfonso Ugarte convinced the Universitario de Deportes management to sign him. He began playing more regularly from 1936 onward and became a key player in Universitario's title win in 1939.

Two years later, he joined Newell's Old Boys in Argentina and made his debut on 30 March 1941, against San Lorenzo (5–1 victory). He remained with Newell's Old Boys for three seasons, playing 77 matches. On 11 March 1944, he transferred to Platense but played only 12 matches due to a meniscus injury.

He returned to Peru in 1948 and joined Centro Iqueño, where he retired in 1949.

=== International career ===
A Peruvian international 19 times between 1937 and 1942, Juan Honores participated in four South American championships in 1937, 1939, 1941 and 1942. He had the honor of being part of the Peruvian team that won the South American championship in 1939.

== Managerial career ==
After serving as player-manager at Centro Iqueño in 1949, it took Juan Honores a decade to return to the forefront of the coaching scene. Between 1960 and 1962, he managed Sporting Cristal, leading them to the Peruvian championship in 1961.

He subsequently managed Deportivo Municipal, Defensor Lima, and Atlético Grau before taking over as manager of Carlos A. Mannucci, where he won his second title as a manager: the 1968 Copa Perú. He retired after a final stint as manager of Deportivo Junín in 1977.

== Death ==
Having retired from the world of football, Juan Honores worked at the newspaper Expreso (where he wrote a sports column) and died in Lima on 9 June 1990, at the age of 75.

== Honours ==
=== Player ===
Universitario de Deportes

- Peruvian Primera División: 1939

Peru

- South American Championship: 1939

=== Manager ===
Sporting Cristal

- Torneo Descentralizado: 1961

Carlos A. Mannucci

- Copa Perú: 1968

Atlético Grau

- Torneo Apertura: 1969
