= José Chiarella =

Peruvian football manager (1929–2019)

Personal information
- Full name: José Hernani Chiarella Espíritu
- Date of birth: 7 April 1929
- Place of birth: Lima, Peru
- Date of death: 22 September 2019 (aged 90)
- Place of death: Lima, Peru

Managerial career
- Years: Team
- 1957: Mariscal Sucre
- 1958–1959: Unión América
- 1961: KDT Nacional
- 1963: KDT Nacional
- 1964: Ciclista Lima
- 1966: Sport Boys
- 1967: Porvenir Miraflores
- 1968: Defensor Lima
- 1969: Sport Boys
- 1970: Defensor Lima
- 1973: Peru (assistant)
- 1977: Defensor Lima
- 1978: Sport Boys
- 1979: Peru
- 1980–1981: Sport Boys
- 1982: Deportivo Municipal
- 1983: Portuguesa F.C.
- 1984: Sporting Cristal
- 1985–1986: FBC Melgar
- 1988: Internazionale San Borja
- 1990: Meteor S.C.
- 1991–1992: Carlos A. Mannucci
- 1993–1994: Defensor Lima
- 1997: Atlético Grau

José Hernani Chiarella Espíritu (7 April 1929 – 22 September 2019) was a Peruvian football manager.

== Biography ==
=== Managerial career ===
A graduate in pharmaceutical chemistry, with a background in physical education, José Chiarella distinguished himself at Sport Boys, which he managed on four separate occasions (1966, 1969, 1978, and 1980–81). He also coached Defensor Lima on four separate occasions (1968, 1970, 1977, and 1993–94).

He had other, shorter stints at Deportivo Municipal (in 1982) and Sporting Cristal (in 1984), with a brief spell in Venezuela at Portuguesa F.C. in 1983.

After serving as Roberto Scarone's assistant with the Peruvian national football team in 1973, he became the head coach for the 1979 Copa América, a tournament Peru lost after coming in as the defending champions.

He ended his career in the 1990s after two stints with clubs in northern Peru: Carlos A. Mannucci in 1991–1992 and Atlético Grau in 1997.

=== Death ===
Having retired from football, he died on September 22, 2019, at the age of 90.

== Honours ==
Unión América

- Peruvian Segunda División: 1958

KDT Nacional

- Peruvian Segunda División: 1961
