= Jaime de Almeida =

Brazilian footballer and manager (1920–1973)

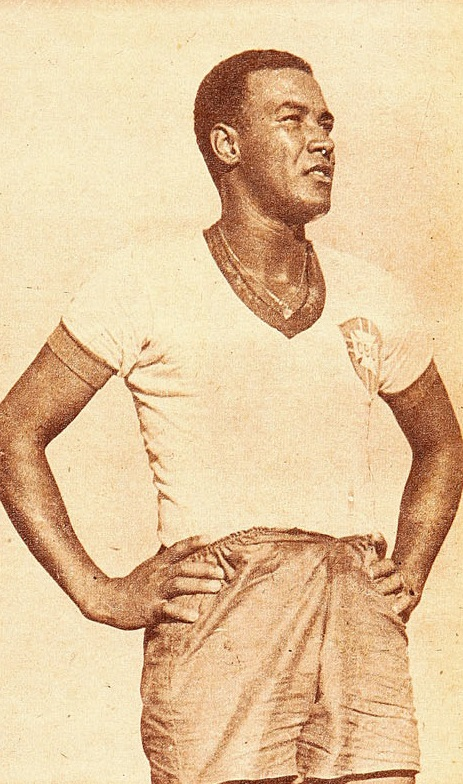
- Jaime in 1945

Personal information
- Date of birth: August 28, 1920
- Place of birth: São Fidélis, Brazil
- Date of death: May 11, 1973 (aged 52)
- Place of death: Lima, Peru
- Position: Midfielder

Senior career*
Years	Team	Apps	(Gls)
1937–1938	Sete de Setembro FC (MG)		
1939	Flamengo		
1940	Atlético Mineiro		
1941–1950	Flamengo		

International career
1942–1946	Brazil	14	(1)

Managerial career
- 1946: Flamengo
- 1947: Flamengo
- 1950–1951: Flamengo
- 1953: Flamengo
- 1958–1960: Flamengo
- 1961–1969: Alianza Lima
- 1972: Defensor Arica
Medal record
First place	Campeonato Mineiro	1938
First place	Campeonato Mineiro	1942
First place	Campeonato Mineiro	1943
First place	Campeonato Mineiro	1944
- * Club domestic league appearances and goals

Jaime de Almeida (28 August 1920 in São Fidélis, Rio de Janeiro state, Brazil – 11 May 1973 in Lima, Peru) was a Brazilian football player and manager, who managed Flamengo on seven occasions.

== Managerial statistics ==
As of match played 31 March 2024

Managerial record by team and tenure
Team	Nat	From	To	Record				
Team	Nat	From	To	G	W	D	L	Win %
Flamengo	(Brazil)	1946	1946	2	1	0	1	50.00
Flamengo	(Brazil)	1947	1947	5	2	1	2	40.00
Flamengo	(Brazil)	1950	1950	5	1	1	3	20.00
Flamengo	(Brazil)	1950	1951	7	3	2	2	42.86
Flamengo	(Brazil)	1953	1953	19	9	7	3	47.37
Flamengo	(Brazil)	1958	1958	8	3	4	1	37.50
Flamengo	(Brazil)	1959	1959	23	13	5	5	56.52
Allianza Lima	(Peru)	1961	1969	226	114	57	55	50.44
Career total				295	146	77	72	49.49
