= Breña =

District in Lima, Peru

- District
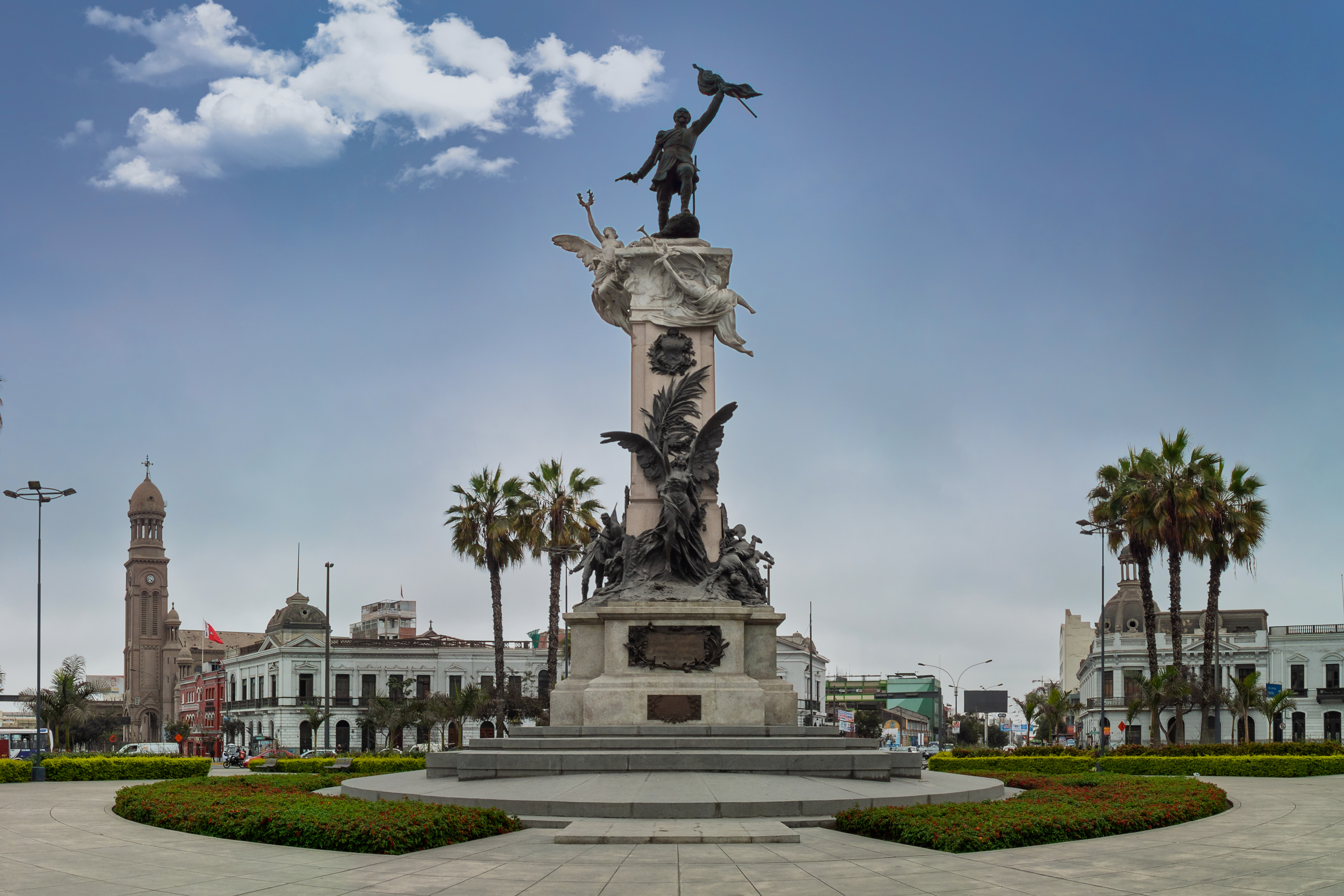
- View from Bolognesi Square

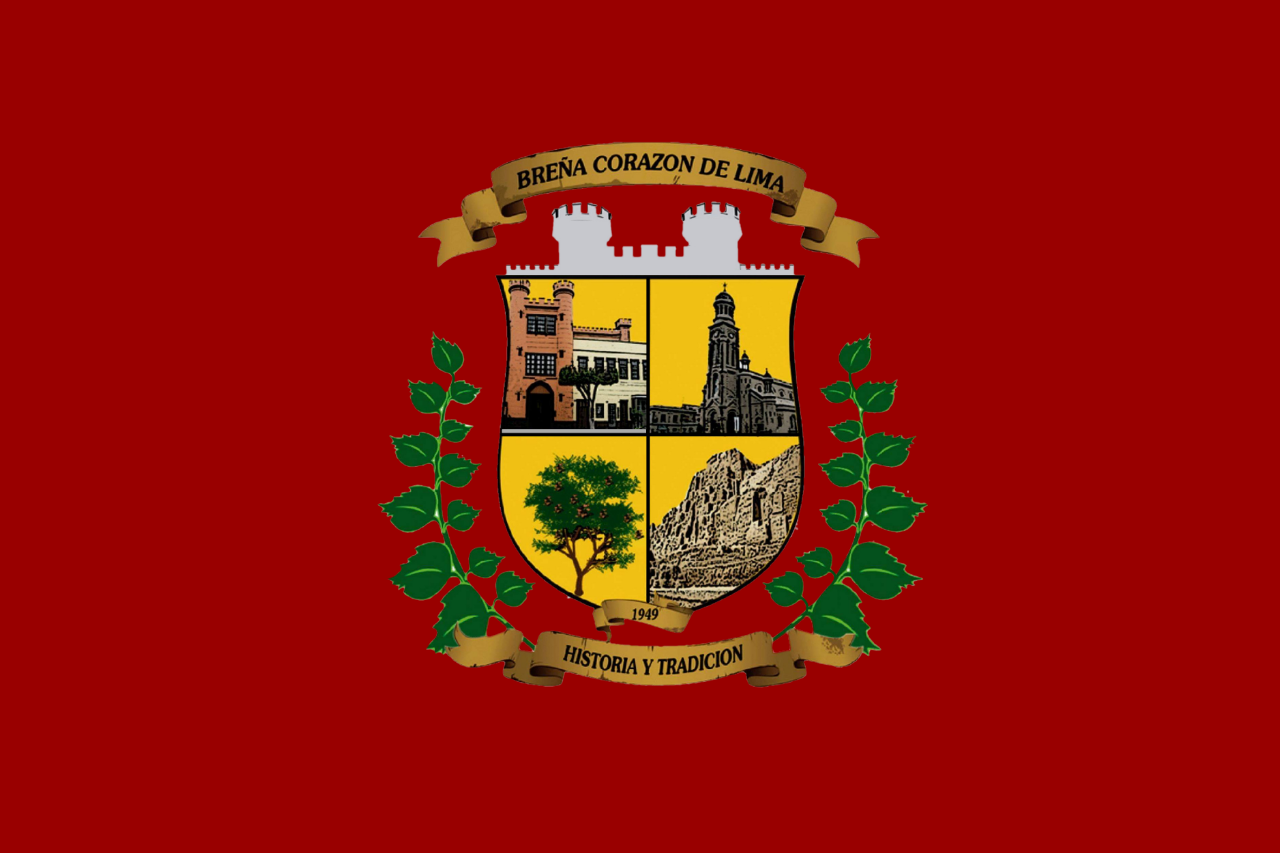
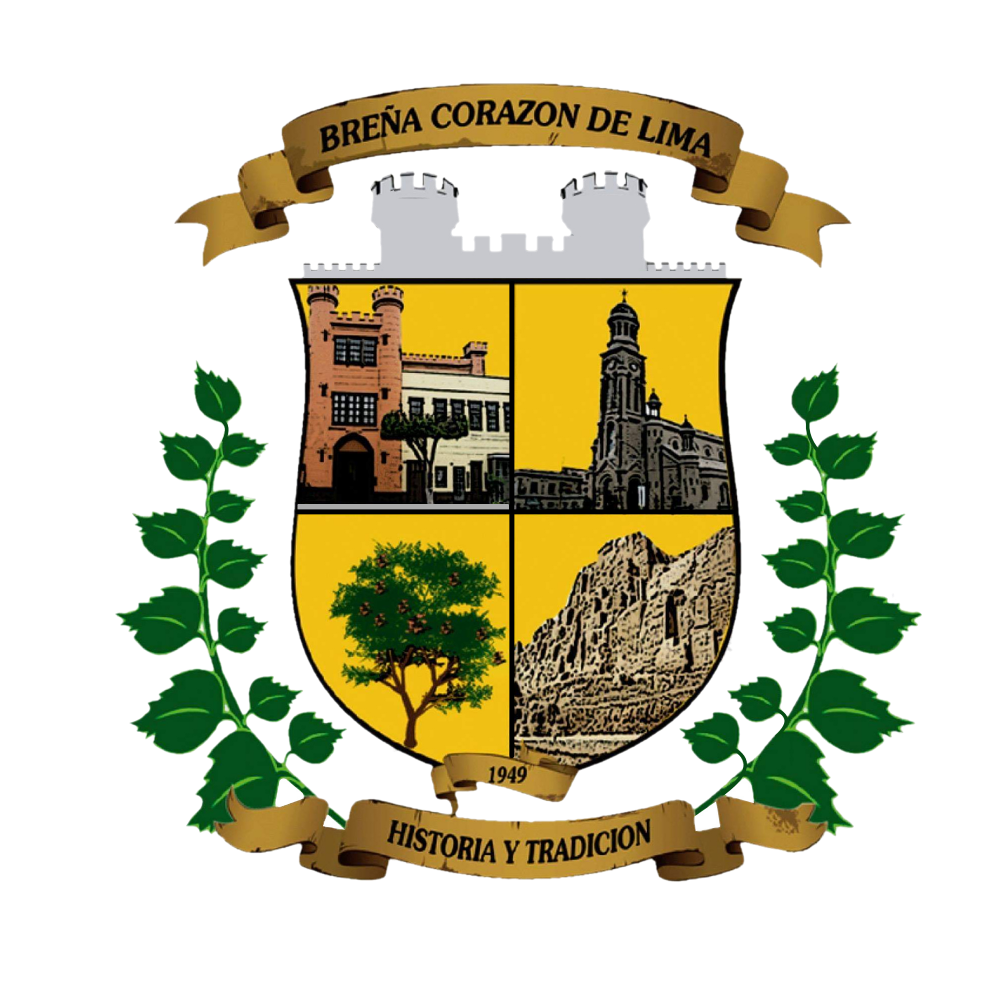
- Flag Coat of arms

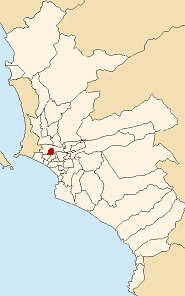
- Location in Lima Province
- Coordinates: 12°03′31″S 77°03′00″W
- Country: Peru
- Department: Lima
- Province: Lima
- Founded: July 15, 1949; 77 years ago

Government
  - Mayor: Luis de la Mata

Area
  - Total: 3.22 km^{2} (1.24 sq mi)

Population (2023)
  - Total: 97,906
  - Density: 30,400/km^{2} (78,800/sq mi)
- Time zone: UTC-5 (PET)
- UBIGEO: 150105
- Website: munibrena.gob.pe

Breña (Spanish: [ˈbɾeɲa]) is a district of Lima, Peru. It is the second smallest district of the city, and its creation dates back to the demolition of the city walls ordered by president José Balta during the late 19th century, which led to the broad expansion of the city.

== Etymology ==
The district is named after an hacienda of the same name that used to be located in the area.

== History ==
On December 2, 1869, president José Balta signed the decree that ordered the demolition of the city walls, constructed during the city's Spanish period to protect it from possible attacks by pirates. According to an 1880 map by P. V. Jouanny, the city ended to the west at the Avenida de la Circunvalación, which had been built over the space occupied by the former walls.

The district was created through Law-Decree N° 11059, signed by president Manuel A. Odría on July 15, 1949. It is named after the former hacienda of the same name. The district originally included the neighbourhoods of Breña, Chacra Colorada, Garden City, Azcona, Chacra Ríos, Dos de Mayo, Conde de las Torres and Wiese, being reduced in size 10 years later, with only Breña, Chacra Colorada, Garden City and Azcona remaining in the district.

== Politics ==
Breña is under the jurisdiction of its own district municipality, as well as that of the Metropolitan Municipality of Lima.

=== List of mayors ===
Since 2023, the incumbent mayor is Luis Felipe De La Mata Martínez.

1. Luis B. Nicolini Peschiera (1949–1955)
2. Juan Rissi Manfredi (1956–1962)
3. Roberto Rubín Hudson (1962–1963)
4. Fabio de la Torre Neyra (1963)
5. Carlos Salazar Beraún (1964–1969)
6. Víctor Graham Morales (1970–1976)
7. Aurelio del Corral Salcedo (1977–1979)
8. Pedro Villanueva Calderón (1979–1980)
9. Alfredo Swayne de la Cruz (1981–1983)
10. Luis A. Suito Tuesta (1984–1986)
11. Rodolfo Galván Montoya (1987–1989)
12. Rolando Velasco Vásquez (1990–1992)
13. Juan José Gonzales Saldaña (1993–1995)
14. Carlos Salazar Beraún (1996–1998)
15. Carlos Sandoval Blancas (1999–2006)
16. José Gordillo Abad (2007–2010)
17. José Gordillo Abad (2011–2014)
18. Ángel Wu Huapaya (2015–2018)
19. José Li Bravo (2019–2022)
20. Luis Felipe De La Mata Martínez (2023–present)

== Geography ==
The district has a total land area of 3.22 km^{2}. Its administrative center is located 102 meters above sea level. It is part of Lima's Cono Centro, an unofficial subregion of the city.

=== Boundaries ===
- North, East and West: Lima District
- Southeast: Jesús María District
- Southwest: Pueblo Libre District

== Climate ==
Climate data for Lima
Month	Jan	Feb	Mar	Apr	May	Jun	Jul	Aug	Sep	Oct	Nov	Dec	Year
Record high °F	79	79	79	75	72	68	66	64	66	68	72	75	72
Record high °C	26	26	26	24	22	20	19	18	19	20	22	24	22
Average precipitation days	1	1	0	0	1	2	3	3	3	2	2	0	16
Average rainy days	4	2	3	2	5	11	12	15	13	7	5	3	82
Average relative humidity (%)	85	80	80	85	85	85	85	85	85	85	85	85	84.2
Mean monthly sunshine hours	179.1	169	139.2	184	116.4	50.6	28.6	32.3	37.3	65.3	89	139.2	1,284
Source: Weatherbase (Temperature, precipitation and humidity). and Universidad Complutense de Madrid (Sunlight)

== Culture ==
=== Festivities ===
- May 24: Mary Help of Christians
- November: Lord of Miracles

== See also ==
- Administrative divisions of Peru
