= History of the Torneo Descentralizado =

History of the Peruvian Primera División

The Torneo Descentralizado is the national Peruvian professional league for association football clubs. At the top of the Peruvian football league system, it is the country's primary football competition. The responsibility for its organization lies within the Asociación Deportiva de Fútbol Profesional. Contested by 16 clubs, it operates on a system of promotion and relegation with the Segunda División and the Copa Peru. Seasons run from February to December but the competition format varies from season to season. Most games are played on Saturdays and Sundays, with a few games played during weekday evenings. It is currently sponsored by Movistar TV and therefore commercially known as the Torneo Descentralizado Copa Movistar.

The tournament was established in 1966 following the decision of the Peruvian Football Federation to create a national football championship which had not existed since Peruvian football competitions for clubs were first organized in the early twentieth century. Since 1966, a total of 10 clubs have been crowned national champions. Sporting Cristal is the most successful club, winning seventeen national titles. Only three clubs outside the Lima Province have won a national championship, the first being Unión Huaral (2 titles), the second being Melgar (2 titles), and the third being Juan Aurich (1).

== History ==
Descentralizado champions
Season	Champions
1966	Universitario
1967	Universitario
1968	Sporting Cristal
1969	Universitario
1970	Sporting Cristal
1971	Universitario
1972	Sporting Cristal
1973	Defensor Lima
1974	Universitario
1975	Alianza Lima
1976	Unión Huaral
1977	Alianza Lima
1978	Alianza Lima
1979	Sporting Cristal
1980	Sporting Cristal
1981	Melgar
1982	Universitario
1983	Sporting Cristal
1984	Sport Boys
1985	Universitario
1986	San Agustín
1987	Universitario
1988	Sporting Cristal
1989	Unión Huaral
1990	Universitario
1991	Sporting Cristal
1992	Universitario
1993	Universitario
1994	Sporting Cristal
1995	Sporting Cristal
1996	Sporting Cristal
1997	Alianza Lima
1998	Universitario
1999	Universitario
2000	Universitario
2001	Alianza Lima
2002	Sporting Cristal
2003	Alianza Lima
2004	Alianza Lima
2005	Sporting Cristal
2006	Alianza Lima
2007	Universidad San Martín
2008	Universidad San Martín
2009	Universitario
2010	Universidad San Martín
2011	Juan Aurich
2012	Sporting Cristal
2013	Universitario
2014	Sporting Cristal
2015	Melgar
2016	Sporting Cristal
2017	Alianza Lima
2018	Sporting Cristal
Further information: Peruvian football champions

Peruvian football was not played at a national level since the first football leagues were formed in the early twentieth century. Football was played regionally, with Lima's first division being the most important championship, turning professional in 1951, and having its champion qualify to the Copa Libertadores starting in 1960. In 1966, the first national championship was contested featuring the 10 professional Lima-based teams that would have played in the Liga Provincial de Fútbol de Lima and four teams from different parts of the country including Grau of Piura, Melgar of Arequipa, Alfonso Ugarte (Ch) of Trujillo, and Octavio Espinoza of Ica.

The first Torneo Descentralizado made its debut on 13 August 1966 in the Estadio Nacional featuring two games. The first game was played between Universitario and promoted Mariscal Sucre, which ended in a 1–1 draw. The second match in the Estadio Nacional was a 0–0 draw between Sporting Cristal and Alfonso Ugarte (Ch) played immediately after the first match. Universitario would go on to become the first national champion and qualifying to the 1967 Copa Libertadores. In addition, the runner-up Sport Boys also qualified to the Copa Libertadores after CONMEBOL expanded the number of berths for each member association from one to two. With the Descentralizado came the creation of the Copa Perú which was an amateur national football tournament contested by teams outside of the Lima and Callao provinces. A national second division still did not exist yet. Thus, the Segunda División was only contested by teams from within the Lima and Callao provinces allowing both tournaments to promote at least one team at the end of each season. The 1966 season had conditioned the four countryside-based teams. They had to finish the season above eighth place in order to avoid relegation. Of the four teams, only Grau was fortunate enough to place above the set requirement. Melgar, Alfonso Ugarte (Ch), and Octavio Espinoza were relegated but immediately played in the finals of the first Copa Perú in which both Alfonso Ugarte (Ch) and Octavio Espinoza were able to return to the top flight for 1967 along with newcomer Juan Aurich.

The second edition of Peru's new national football championship was played in the same manner as the first edition; 14 teams and each team playing 26 matches. Juan Aurich of Chiclayo was the fifth countryside team to participate in the Descentralizado. Universitario successfully defended their title. In the Torneo Descentralizado's third edition, Juan Aurich notably tied with Sporting Cristal at the end of the season for first place. The championship was to be defined in a single playoff match in the Estadio Nacional. Sporting Cristal won the playoff 21 but Juan Aurich, as runner-up, qualified for the Copa Libertadores. In the Descentralizado's fourth season, the tournament format was modified. The tournament was played in two stages. The first stage had each team playing all the other teams once. In the second stage, the top 6 teams advanced to a championship group with the national title in dispute and the bottom 8 teams advanced to a relegation group where the bottom two teams were relegated at the end of the season. Universitario won the 1969 season for their third Descentralizado title and Defensor Arica qualified to their first and only Copa Libertadores.

The 1970 Torneo Descentralizado was affected by the Peru national football team's qualification to the 1970 FIFA World Cup in Mexico. Therefore, it was agreed upon that the season would not start the week following Peru's exit from the Cup. Thus, on June 19, one week after Peru's quarterfinal elimination at the hands of Brazil, the 1970 season kicked off at the Estadio Nacional with a 0–0 result between Municipal and Octavio Espinoza. Sporting Cristal was the eventual champion, claiming their second national title. The 1971 season expanded to 16 teams from the original 14. Universitario went on to win a fourth national title and qualified to the 1972 Copa Libertadores, in which they reached the final to play against Independiente of Argentina. The 1972 Torneo Descentralizado was won by Sporting Cristal tallying 3 national titles. For the 1973 season, the league was again expanded, this time to 18 teams. Defensor Lima made history becoming the national champion after 7 seasons seeing championships won by Universitario and Sporting Cristal.

Following Peru's elimination in the World Cup Qualifiers, the government of Peru ordered the national league be expanded to 22 teams. Each team played 42 matches with the top 6 teams playing an additional 5 matches against each other to determine the champion. Universitario extended their title count to 5 while Unión Huaral qualified to their first Copa Libertadores. For 1975, the teams were reduced to 18 but played in the same manner as 1974. Alianza Lima won their first national championship. Alfonso Ugarte tied with Universitario for second place forcing an extra match for the second Peruvian team to qualify to the Copa Libertadores. Alfonso Ugarte won 54 in a penalty shootout after 00 draw. The following season also underwent a team reduction. 16 teams disputed the 1976 Descentralizado which finished with Unión Huaral and Sport Boys tied for first. Unión Huaral won the title-deciding match by 20. Unión Huaral won a historic first national championship becoming the first team outside the Lima–Callao hub. With the World Cup in Argentina coming up, the government of Peru decided to give economic support in order to bring several Peruvian players back to Peru. Alianza Lima won the 1977 season claiming their second national title.

As in 1970, Peru's participation in the 1978 FIFA World Cup affected the start of the 1978 Torneo Descentralizado. The tournament initiated on July 5, however, a minor tournament was played with the 16 teams in the months leading to the World Cup. Coronel Bolognesi won the minor tournament but the tournament did award Bolognesi anything that would benefit them in the Descentralizado. Alianza Lima successfully defended its 1977 title, becoming national champion for the third time. Sporting Cristal won both the 1979 and 1980 to tie Universitario for 5 national titles. Atlético Chalaco and Torino qualified to their first Copa Libertadores via the 1979 and 1980 seasons respectively. The following season Melgar made Descentralizado history by becoming the first and only team outside the Lima Region to win the national championship. Melgar finished the 1981 season 1 point ahead of Universitario, who lost to Municipal in the playoff matches to decide the second Peruvian team in the 1982 Copa Libertadores. This was Municipal's first and only participation in the Copa Libertadores.

In 1982, Peru was to compete in the 1982 FIFA World Cup and consequently, the season was played similarly to 1978. A minor tournament was played in the months leading up to the World Cup which was won by Sporting Cristal. The 1982 Torneo Descentralizado began on July 18—one week after the World Cup final. The season was divided into several group stages and Universitario won its sixth national title, 2 points ahead of rival Alianza Lima in the final group stage. Melgar came close to winning the 1983 season but the victor was Sporting Cristal, tying Universitario in national titles for 6 each. For the 1983 Torneo Descentralizado, the season was played in two stages with 17 teams. The top 6 teams at the end of the first stage advanced to a final group stage which was won by Sporting Cristal, after Melgar failed to maintain their first stage lead. The following season was played with 25 teams divided into four region-based groups. Fourteen teams advanced from the regional group stages into the 1984 Torneo Descentralizado which was Sport Boys first season as national champion. Universitario won a 7th championship in 1985.

In 1986, San Agustín made history after defeating Alianza Lima in the 1986 Torneo Descentralizado final. This was only their second season in the top division. In 1987, Universitario and Alianza Lima faced off in the final of the season. Universitario won 1–0. The 1988 season was split into 2 regional tournaments in which its winners would face in the season final—format that would last until 1991. The regional champions Universitario and Sporting Cristal faced off. Sporting Cristal lifted the national championship after a 2–1 victory. In 1989, Unión Huaral and Sporting Cristal were contesting the final and won by Unión Huaral to win their second national championship. The 1990 season—played with a record 44 teams—was won by Universitario with a 4–2 victory over Sport Boys in the final, totaling 9 national championships. The following season—the last time regional tournaments would be used—was won by Sporting Cristal in a penalty shootout against Universitario in the final, resulting in a sum of 8 national championships.

The 1992 Torneo Descentralizado reduced the team number to 16 and season finals would not be played until 1997. Universitario won back-to-back titles with the 1992 and 1993 tournaments. Sporting Cristal made history winning three seasons consecutively from 1994 to 1996. In 1997 the Apertura and Clausura tournament formats were employed in the Descentralizado. Alianza Lima returned to the top of Peruvian football after winning the 1997 season—a first since 1978. Alianza won both tournaments to become national champion. Between 1998 and 2000, Universitario would repeat Sporting Cristal's feat, winning 3 consecutive titles. The 1998 season was won after defeating Cristal in a penalty shootout in the final, whilst the 1999 season was won against Alianza Lima on aggregate score.

The 2001 season marked Alianza's and Cienciano's centenary and both teams reached the finals. Alianza Lima won their 5th national title after defeating Cienciano in a penalty shootout. Despite notably winning the 2001 Torneo Apertura, Alianza placed 10th in the Torneo Clausura which forced a rule change for 2002. A Torneo Apertura winner had to place above 5th place in the Torneo Clausura and vice versa in order for a tournament champion to dispute the final. Universitario won the 2002 Torneo Apertura but they placed 11th in the Torneo Clausura. Therefore, the championship went to the Torneo Clausura winner Sporting Cristal. 2003 and 2004 were won by Alianza Lima. Both times saw Alianza defeat Cristal in the final. In 2005 and 2006, Cienciano returned to Peruvian finals, however failed to win them after losing 1–0 to Cristal in 2005 and eliminated on aggregate to Alianza Lima in 2006.

In 2007, a new champion rose to fame as Universidad San Martín won the national championship. They repeated their success the following season after winning the 2008 Torneo Clausura and Torneo Apertura winner Universitario failed to finish above 8th place. In 2009, Universitario—after failing to win any championships following their 2000 season—won the championship defeating Alianza Lima in the finals. Universidad San Martín won a third title in 2010 defeating promoted León de Huánuco in the finals.

== Competition format and sponsorship ==
=== Domestic ===
The 2011 season will be played by 16 teams. The season runs from February to December and will be played in two stages. The first stage is a regular season where each teams plays 30 home-and-away fixtures. The second stage is a final play-off to decide the national champion between the teams that place first and second in the first stage. The fixtures will be played on the weekends on Saturdays and Sundays and some fixtures will be played on Wednesdays. Teams receive three points for a win and one point for a draw. No points are awarded for a loss. Teams are ranked by total points, then goal difference, and then goals scored. A tie in points for relegation will result in a play-off at a neutral ground chosen by the ADFP. Two teams will be relegated and the champions of the second division and Copa Perú will take their place. With regard to foreign players, Peruvians teams are limited to four players without Peruvian citizenship per game.

Number of clubs in Primera División throughout the years
Period (in years)	No. of clubs
1966–1970	14 clubs
1971–1972	16 clubs
1973	18 clubs
1974	22 clubs
1975	18 clubs
1976–1982	16 clubs
1983	17 clubs
1984	25 clubs
1985–1987	30 clubs
1988	37 clubs
1989	42 clubs
1990	44 clubs

Number of clubs in Primera División throughout the years
Period (in years)	No. of clubs
1991	41 clubs
1992–1996	16 clubs
1997	14 clubs
1998–2003	12 clubs
2004	14 clubs
2005	13 clubs
2006–2007	12 clubs
2008	14 clubs
2009–2014	16 clubs
2015	17 clubs
2016–2018	16 clubs

=== International ===
Six teams will participate in international competitions while they play the national championship. These international club fixtures take place during the week on Tuesdays, Wednesdays, and Thursdays. During the first half of the year, three teams will participate in the 2011 Copa Libertadores. Universidad San Martín and León de Huánuco will start in the second stage and Alianza Lima will start in the first stage. During the second half of the year, three teams will participate in the 2011 Copa Sudamericana. Universitario will start in the second stage while Universidad César Vallejo and Juan Aurich will both start off in the first stage.

=== South American qualification ===
South America has two international competitions played every year. For 2011, Peru will have six berths, three in the Copa Libertadores and three in the Copa Sudamericana. The two Peruvian finalists of the season will qualify directly to the second stage of the Copa Libertadores. The third berth will be given to the third-placed team at the end of the season. This team will start in the first stage of the Copa Libertadores. Teams placed fourth through sixth will qualify to the Copa Sudamericana.

=== Sponsorship ===
The Torneo Descentralizado is sponsored by Movistar TV (formerly known as Cable Mágico), hence the commercial name Copa Movistar. They have had exclusive broadcasting rights since 1999. In 2007 DirecTV began competing with Cable Mágico for broadcasting rights of a few teams and currently holds the rights to two teams—Sporting Cristal and Universidad San Martín de Porres.

== Total titles won ==
Club	Winners	Runners-up	Winning years	Runners-up years
Sporting Cristal	17	11	1968, 1970, 1972, 1979, 1980, 1983, 1988, 1991, 1994, 1995, 1996, 2002, 2005, 2012, 2014, 2016, 2018	1967, 1973, 1977, 1989, 1992, 1997, 1998, 2000, 2003, 2004, 2015
Universitario	16	8	1966, 1967, 1969, 1971, 1974, 1982, 1985, 1987, 1990, 1992, 1993, 1998, 1999, 2000, 2009, 2013	1970, 1972, 1978, 1984, 1988, 1995, 2002, 2008
Alianza Lima	9	10	1975, 1977, 1978, 1997, 2001, 2003, 2004, 2006, 2017	1971, 1982, 1986, 1987, 1993, 1994, 1996, 1999, 2009, 2011, 2018
Universidad San Martín	3	0	2007, 2008, 2010	—
Melgar	2	2	1981, 2015	1983, 2016
Unión Huaral	2	1	1976, 1989	1974
Sport Boys	1	4	1984	1966, 1976, 1990, 1991
Juan Aurich	1	2	2011	1968, 2014
Defensor Lima	1	0	1973	—
San Agustín	1	0	1986	—
Cienciano	0	3	—	2001, 2005, 2006
Real Garcilaso	0	3	—	2012, 2013, 2017
Alfonso Ugarte	0	1	—	1975
Atlético Chalaco	0	1	—	1979
Atlético Torino	0	1	—	1980
Coronel Bolognesi	0	1	—	2007
Defensor Arica	0	1	—	1969
Deportivo Municipal	0	1	—	1981
León de Huánuco	0	1	—	2010
UTC	0	1	—	1985

=== Total title won by region ===
Region	Number of titles	Clubs
Lima	46	Sporting Cristal (17), Universitario (16), Alianza Lima (9), Universidad San Martín (3), Unión Huaral (2), Defensor Lima (1), San Agustín (1)
Arequipa	2	Melgar (2)
Callao	1	Sport Boys (1)
(Department of Lambayeque) Lambayeque	1	Juan Aurich (1)
