= Franco Navarro =

Peruvian footballer (born 1961)

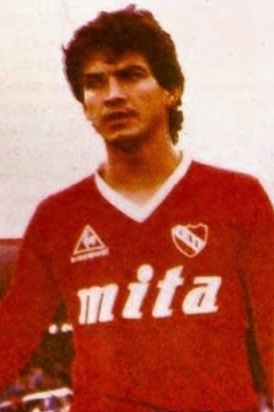
- Navarro with Independiente in 1987

Personal information
- Full name: Franco Enrique Navarro Monteiro
- Date of birth: 10 November 1961 (age 65)
- Place of birth: Lima, Peru
- Height: 1.80 m (5 ft 11 in)
- Position: Striker

Senior career*
Years	Team	Apps	(Gls)
1979–1982	Municipal		
1983–1985	Sporting Cristal		
1985–1986	Independiente Medellín		
1986–1988	Independiente	70	(22)
1988	Tecos UAG	3	(0)
1989	Wettingen	8	(0)
1989–1990	Unión Santa Fe	10	(0)
1991–1992	Sporting Cristal		
1993	Municipal		
1994	Carlos A. Mannucci	4	(2)
1995	Alianza Lima		

International career
1980–1989	Peru	56	(16)

Managerial career
- 1998–2000: Sporting Cristal
- 2001: Estudiantes de Medicina
- 2002: Alianza Lima
- 2003: Unión Huaral
- 2004–2005: Sport Boys
- 2005: UCV
- 2006: Peru
- 2007–2008: Cienciano
- 2008–2009: Juan Aurich
- 2010–2011: León de Huánuco
- 2012: USMP
- 2012: Juan Aurich
- 2013: Melgar
- 2014–2016: UCV
- 2016–2020: UTC
- 2021: Deportivo Municipal
- 2022: UTC
- 2022–2023: ADT
- 2024: Carlos A. Mannucci
- 2024: Sport Huancayo
- * Club domestic league appearances and goals as of February 2008

Franco Enrique Navarro Monteiro (born 10 November 1961) is a Peruvian football manager and former player who played as a striker.

== Club career ==
Navarro played for Independiente from Argentina, Deportivo Municipal, Sporting Cristal, Alianza Lima from Peru and FC Wettingen from Switzerland among others. He retired in 1995.

== International career ==
He was a prolific goal scorer and a participant at the 1982 FIFA World Cup. He was also member of the Peru national football team for the qualification stages of the World Cup in Mexico (1986) and Italy (1990). Navarro played a total of 56 games for Peru between 1980 and 1989, scoring 16 goals. He made his debut on 18 July 1980 in a friendly against Uruguay (0–0) in Montevideo. His last game was on 27 August 1989 against Uruguay at a FIFA World Cup Qualifier.

He is remembered for the leg-breaking incident five minutes into the deciding qualifier game between Argentina and Peru in the 1986 FIFA World Cup in Mexico. The Argentine defender Julián Camino broke Navarro’s leg with a tackle. Camino was not expelled from the game. Argentina with Ricardo Gareca tied the game 2–2 and qualified to the World Cup; Argentina would go on to win the 1986 World Cup.

== Coaching career ==
He has been a coach for several Peruvian teams, including Sporting Cristal, Alianza Lima, and Cienciano as well as the Peru national football team.

== Career statistics ==
=== Club ===
Appearances and goals by club, season and competition
Club	Season	League			National cup		Continental		Other		Total	
Club	Season	Division	Apps	Goals	Apps	Goals	Apps	Goals	Apps	Goals	Apps	Goals
Deportivo Municipal	1979	Torneo Descentralizado	4	3							4	3
Deportivo Municipal	1980	Torneo Descentralizado	28	15							28	15
Deportivo Municipal	1981	Torneo Descentralizado	21	11							21	11
Deportivo Municipal	1982	Torneo Descentralizado	26	14			2	0			28	14
Deportivo Municipal	1983	Torneo Descentralizado	22	8							22	8
Deportivo Municipal	1993	Torneo Descentralizado	9	2							9	2
Deportivo Municipal	Total		110	53			2	0			112	53
Independiente Medellín	1984	Campeonato Profesional	35	10							35	10
Independiente Medellín	1985	Campeonato Profesional	41	13								
Independiente Medellín	Total		76	23							76	23
CA Independiente	1986-87	Argentine Primera División	34	17			8	3			42	20
CA Independiente	1987-88	Argentine Primera División	27	5							27	5
CA Independiente	Total		61	22			8	3			69	25
Tecos F.C.	1988	Liga MX	3	0	8	5					11	5
Tecos F.C.	1989-90	Liga MX	31	7							31	7
Tecos F.C.	Total		34	7	8	5					42	12
FC Wettingen	1989	Swiss Super League	7	0							7	0
FC Wettingen	Total		7	0							7	0
Unión de Santa Fe	1990-91	Argentine Primera División	10	0							10	0
Unión de Santa Fe	Total		10	0							10	0
Sporting Cristal	1991	Torneo Descentralizado	25	10							25	10
Sporting Cristal	1992	Torneo Descentralizado	12	2			7	1			19	3
Sporting Cristal	Total		37	12			7	1			44	13
Carlos A. Mannucci	1994	Torneo Descentralizado	4	2							4	2
Carlos A. Mannucci	Total		4	2							4	2
Alianza Lima	1995	Torneo Descentralizado	13	1							13	1
Alianza Lima	Total		13	1							13	1
Career total			352	128	8	5	17	4			377	133

=== International ===
Appearances and goals by national team and year
National team	Year	Apps	Goals
Peru	1980	2	0
Peru	1981	2	0
Peru	1982	4	1
Peru	1983	11	3
Peru	1984	3	0
Peru	1985	17	8
Peru	1986	2	1
Peru	1987	4	1
Peru	1988	1	0
Peru	1989	10	2
Total		56	16

Scores and results list Peru's goal tally first, score column indicates score after each Navarro goal.

List of international goals scored by Franco Navarro
No.	Date	Venue	Opponent	Score	Result	Competition
1	30 March 1982	Estadio Nacional, Lima, Peru	Chile	1–0	1–0	Friendly
2	11 August 1983	Estadio Nacional, Lima, Peru	Uruguay	1–1	1–1	Friendly
3	17 August 1983	Estadio Nacional, Lima, Peru	Colombia	1–0	1–0	1983 Copa América
4	21 August 1983	Estadio Hernando Siles, La Paz, Bolivia	Bolivia	1–1	1–1	1983 Copa América
5	17 February 1985	Estadio Nacional, Lima, Peru	Bolivia	1–0	3–0	Friendly
6	17 February 1985	Estadio Nacional, Lima, Peru	Bolivia	2–0	3–0	Friendly
7	17 February 1985	Estadio Nacional, Lima, Peru	Bolivia	3–0	3–0	Friendly
8	24 February 1985	Estadio Nacional, Santiago, Chile	Chile	2–0	2–1	Friendly
9	27 February 1985	Estadio Centenario, Montevideo, Uruguay	Uruguay	1–0	2–2	Friendly
10	16 June 1985	Estadio Nacional, Lima, Peru	Venezuela	1–0	4–1	1986 FIFA World Cup qualification
11	27 October 1985	Estadio Nacional, Santiago, Chile	Chile	1–3	2–4	1986 FIFA World Cup qualification
12	27 October 1985	Estadio Nacional, Santiago, Chile	Chile	2–4	2–4	1986 FIFA World Cup qualification
13	30 January 1986	Greenfield International Stadium, Trivandrum, India	India	1–0	1–0	Friendly
14	19 June 1987	Estadio Nacional, Lima, Peru	Chile	1–0	1–3	Friendly
15	20 June 1989	Queen's Park Oval, Port of Spain, Trinidad and Tobago	Ecuador	2–1	2–1	Friendly
16	5 July 1989	Estádio Fonte Nova, Salvador, Brazil	Venezuela	1–1	1–1	1989 Copa América

== Honours ==
=== Player ===
Sporting Cristal

- Peruvian Primera División: 1991

=== Manager ===
Sporting Cristal

- Torneo Clausura: 1998

Universidad César Vallejo

- Torneo del Inca: 2015
