= List of Universitario de Deportes seasons =

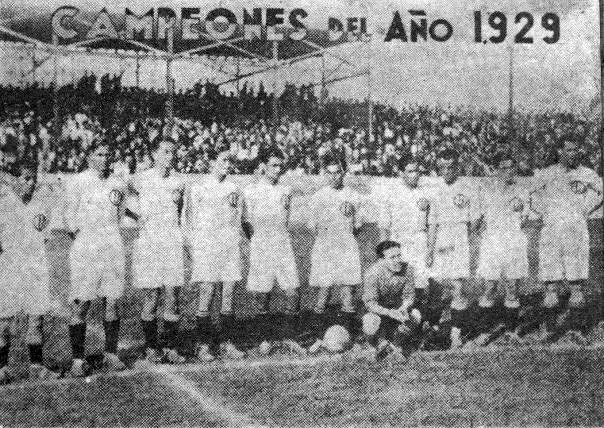
The Universitario squad that won their first Primera División title in 1929: Alva; C. Galindo, Rotta, Denegri, P. Galindo, Astengo, M. Pacheco, P. Pacheco, Góngora, Cillóniz and Souza Ferreira.

This is a list of seasons played by Club Universitario de Deportes in Peruvian and South American football, from 1928 (the year of the club's first participated in the Peruvian Primera División) to the most recent completed season. Club Universitario de Deportes was founded in August, 1924, by students and professors of the National University of San Marcos. Between 1924 and 1927, Universitario played a small number of friendly games. In 1928, the Peruvian Football Federation allowed the club, then known as Federación Universitaria, to enter the Peruvian Primera División, the country's premier division. The club surprised opposing and supporting fans that year because they were the runners-up of the season. During that season, on 23 September 1928, Universitario played the first clásico with Alianza Lima, the defending champion of the season, and won 1–0. However, the team lost to Alianza in an end-of-season play-off for the league title.

The club has won the Peruvian Primera División twenty-six times, a national cup twice, has finished as Copa Libertadores runner-up once, and has never been relegated from Peru's top division.

This list details the club's achievements in all major competitions, and the top scorers for each season (where the information is available). Top scorers in bold were also the top scorers in the Peruvian Primera División that season.

== Key ==
Key to colors and symbols

1st or W	Winners
2nd or RU	Runners-up
3rd	Third place
Last	Last place
♦	League top scorer

Key to league record

- Season = The year and article of the season
- League = League name
- Pld = Games played
- W = Games won
- L = Games lost
- D = Games drawn
- GF = Goals for
- GA = Goals against
- GD = Goal difference
- Pts = Points
- Pos = Regular season position
- Play-offs = Play-offs position

Key to national cups record

- — = Competition not held or canceled
- DNE = Did not enter
- DNQ = Did not qualify
- QR = Qualifying round
- PR = Preliminary round
- GS = Group stage
- R1 = First round
- R2 = Second round
- R3 = Third round
- R4 = Fourth round
- R5 = Fifth round
- KRPO = Knockout round play-offs
- Ro16 = Round of 16
- QF = Quarter-finals
- SF = Semi-finals
- F = Final
- RU = Runners-up
- W = Winners

== Seasons ==
=== Amateur Era (1928-1950) ===
Season	League (Note: For details of league structure, see Peruvian football league system)									National Cups		Tournament Top goalscorer(s)	
Season	Competition	Pos	Pld	W	D	L	GF	GA	Pts	National Cups		Name(s)	Goals
1928	Primera División (First Stage)	2nd	9	5	3	1	20	6	13	—	—	—	—
1928	Primera División (Championship Stage)	2nd (Note: Lost championship play-off to Alianza Lima.)	4	3	0	1	7	4	6	—	—	—	—
1929	Primera División	**1st**	11	7	3	1	26	6	17	—	—	(Peru) **Carlos Cillóniz**	8
1930	Primera División (First Stage)	1st	3	2	1	0	6	1	5	—	—	—	—
1930	Primera División (Championship Stage)	3rd	2	0	1	1	2	3	1	—	—	—	—
1931	Primera División	4th	11	5	1	5	23	15	28.5 (Note: The points system was W:3, D:2, L:1, walkover:0. The results of the reserve teams league were added as bonus points.)	—	—	—	—
1932	Primera División	2nd	7	5	0	2	21	4	22	—	—	(Peru) **Teodoro Fernández**	11
1933	Primera División (Note: First season as Universitario de Deportes)	2nd	9	7	2	0	28	8	30.5	—	—	(Peru) **Teodoro Fernández**	9
1934	Primera División	**1st** (Note: The 1934 title is disputed by Alianza Lima and Universitario.)	8	6	1	1	14	8	26.5	—	—	(Peru) **Teodoro Fernández** (Note: The tournament goalscorer title shared with Jorge Alcalde.)	10
1935	Primera División	3rd	2	1	0	1	5	2	3	—	—	—	—
1936	No official tournament took place, because the Peru national football team competed at the 1936 Berlin Olympic Games.									Honor Division Cup	**W**	—	—
1937	Primera División	3rd	9	5	1	3	21	22	20	—	—	—	—
1938	Primera División	3rd	8	4	1	3	9	8	17	—	—	—	—
1939	Primera División	**1st**	14	9	3	2	32	14	35	—	—	(Peru) **Teodoro Fernández**	15
1940	Primera División	2nd	14	6	4	4	29	19	30	—	—	(Peru) **Teodoro Fernández**	15
1941	Primera División	**1st**	14	7	6	1	26	13	34	—	—	—	—
1942	Primera División	3rd	9	5	2	2	17	14	21	—	—	(Peru) **Teodoro Fernández**	11
1943	Primera División	6th	14	5	2	7	27	32	12	—	—	(Peru) **Germán Cerro**	9
1944	Primera División	3rd	14	6	3	5	32	29	15	—	—	(Peru) **Victor Espinoza**	16
1945	Primera División	**1st**	14	10	1	3	49	23	21	—	—	(Peru) **Teodoro Fernández**	16
1946	Primera División	**1st**	21	11	5	5	59	44	27	—	—	—	—
1947	Primera División	8th (Note: Universitario was not relegated due to the league's decision to cancel relegation that season.)	21	7	3	11	30	39	17	—	—	—	—
1948	Primera División	4th	24	12	4	8	48	41	28	—	—	—	—
1949	Primera División	**1st**	21	12	5	4	48	29	29	—	—	—	—
1950	Primera División	5th	18	9	2	7	30	25	20	—	—	(Peru) **Alberto Terry**	16

=== Professional Era (1951-1965) ===
Season	League									National Cups		Continental / Other		Tournament Top goalscorer(s)	
Season	Competition	Pos	Pld	W	D	L	GF	GA	Pts	National Cups		Continental / Other		Name(s)	Goals
1951	Primera División	7th	18	7	2	9	29	32	16	—	—	—		—	—
1952	Primera División	7th	18	7	2	9	36	36	16	—	—	—		—	—
1953	Primera División	6th	18	7	5	6	38	36	19	—	—	—		—	—
1954	Primera División	3rd	18	9	3	6	38	26	21	—	—	—		—	—
1955	Primera División	2nd	18	10	5	3	30	19	25	—	—	—		—	—
1956	Primera División	4th	18	7	4	7	34	34	18	—	—	—		(Peru) **Daniel Ruiz**	16
1957	Primera División	4th	22	8	8	6	45	34	24	—	—	—		(Peru) **Daniel Ruiz**	20
1958	Primera División	4th	22	10	3	9	31	29	23	—	—	—		—	—
1959	Primera División	**1st**	22	15	3	4	51	30	33	—	—	—		(Peru) **Daniel Ruiz**	28
1960	Primera División	**1st**	18	11	3	4	39	26	25	—	—	Copa Libertadores	DNE (Note: Universitario decided not to participate because they lacked the funds.)	—	—
1961	Primera División	4th	18	6	7	5	34	26	19	—	—	Copa Libertadores	R1	—	—
1962	Primera División	3rd	18	8	6	4	40	30	22	—	—	—		—	—
1963	Primera División	3rd	18	9	5	4	38	20	23	—	—	—		—	—
1964	Primera División	**1st**	22	17	2	3	49	18	36	—	—	—		(Peru) **Ángel Uribe**	15
1965	Primera División	2nd	22	13	5	4	37	21	31	—	—	Copa Libertadores	GS	—	—

=== National Championship Era (1966–present) ===
Season	League								Position		National Cups		Continental / Other		Tournament Top goalscorer(s)	
Season	Competition	Pld	W	D	L	GF	GA	Pts	Pos	Play-offs (Note: Since 1966, play-off games have been used as a tie breaker between teams tie on points for promotion or relegation or as a post-season stage to decide the national championship. Whenever they have occurred, the club's position on that stage is shown in this column.)	National Cups		Continental / Other		Name(s)	Goals
1966	Torneo Descentralizado	26	19	3	4	65	27	41	**1st**	—	—	—	Copa Libertadores	GS	—	—
1967	Torneo Descentralizado	26	20	1	5	64	19	41	**1st**	—	—	—	Copa Libertadores	SF	—	—
1968	Torneo Descentralizado	26	14	6	6	59	26	34	4th	—	—	—	Copa Libertadores	R2	—	—
1969	Torneo Apertura	13	10	1	2	25	13	21	2nd	—	—	—	DNQ		—	—
1969	Torneo Descentralizado	18	9	7	2	35	23	25	**1st**	—	—	—	DNQ		—	—
1970	Torneo Descentralizado	32	19	8	5	69	30	70	2nd	—	Copa Presidente de la República	**W**	Copa Libertadores	R2	—	—
1971	Torneo Descentralizado	30	18	10	2	57	20	46	**1st**	—	—	—	Copa Libertadores	SF	—	—
1972	Metropolitan Group	14	4	5	5	17	17	13	5th	—	—	—	Copa Libertadores	RU	—	—
1972	Torneo Descentralizado	30	12	11	7	61	34	35	4th	—	—	—	Copa Libertadores	RU	—	—
1972	Final Group	5	2	3	0	10	7	7	2nd	—	—	—	Copa Libertadores	RU	—	—
1973	Torneo Descentralizado	39	19	11	9	67	40	49	3rd	—	—	—	Copa Libertadores	GS	—	—
1974	Torneo Descentralizado	47	28	15	4	101	46	71	**1st**	—	—	—	DNQ		—	—
1975	Torneo Descentralizado	39	20	11	8	51	41	51	3rd	—	—	—	Copa Libertadores	SF	—	—
1976	Torneo Descentralizado	30	13	12	5	41	33	36	4th	—	—	—	DNQ		—	—
1977	Torneo Interzonal	16	7	4	5	16	15	18	4th	—	—	—	DNQ		—	—
1977	Torneo Descentralizado	40	13	12	15	55	51	38	6th	—	—	—	DNQ		—	—
1978	Preliminary Tournament	14	4	5	5	16	15	13	5th	—	—	—	DNQ		(Peru) **Juan José Oré**	19
1978	Torneo Descentralizado	30	21	1	8	62	28	43	2nd	—	—	—	DNQ		(Peru) **Juan José Oré**	19
1979	First Stage	30	16	9	5	44	19	41	1st	—	—	—	Copa Libertadores	GS	—	—
1979	Final Group	14	2	4	8	11	19	11 (Note: Received a 3 point bonus for finishing first in the First Stage.)	6th	—	—	—	Copa Libertadores	GS	—	—
1980	Torneo Descentralizado (First Stage)	30	6	16	8	42	41	28	9th (Note: Did not qualify to the final group.)	—	—	—	DNQ		—	—
1981	Torneo Regional	10	5	2	3	13	10	19 (Note: The points system was W:3, Won penalty shoot-out:2, L:0. The results of the reserve teams league were added as bonus points.)	2nd	2nd (Note: Universitario lost the knock-out phase final to Deportivo Municipal.)	—	—	DNQ		—	—
1981	Torneo Descentralizado	30	16	7	7	48	30	39	2nd	2nd (Note: Universitario won the Copa Libertadores play-off against the Regional tournament champion, Deportivo Municipal.)	—	—	DNQ		—	—
1982	First Stage	20	8	7	5	28	0	23	3rd	—	—	—	DNQ		(Peru) **Percy Rojas**	19
1982	Second Stage	8	2	5	1	9	7	9	2nd	—	—	—	DNQ		(Peru) **Percy Rojas**	19
1982	Final Group	3	3	0	0	5	2	6	**1st**	—	—	—	DNQ		(Peru) **Percy Rojas**	19
1983	First Stage	32	13	14	5	43	20	40	3rd	—	—	—	Copa Libertadores	GS	—	—
1983	Final Group	5	2	2	1	9	8	7 (Note: Received a 1 point bonus for finishing third in the First Stage.)	3rd	—	—	—	Copa Libertadores	GS	—	—
1984	Regional tournament	18	10	6	2	28	14	26	1st	—	—	—	DNQ		(Peru) **Jaime Drago** (Note: The tournament goalscorer title shared with Francisco Montero.)	13
1984	Torneo Descentralizado	26	11	5	10	41	32	27	6th	—	—	—	DNQ		(Peru) **Jaime Drago**	13
1984	Libertadores/Runner-up Play-off	2	0	2	0	1	1	2	1st	2nd (Note: Universitario finished tied in points with FBC Melgar whom they defeat by 2–1 in a tie-breaker game.)	—	—	DNQ		(Peru) **Jaime Drago**	13
1985	Regional tournament	22	6	12	4	20	15	24	4th	1st (Note: Universitario won the Regional Liguilla bracket by defeating CNI.)	—	—	Copa Libertadores	GS	—	—
1985	Torneo Descentralizado	30	15	9	6	51	25	39	2nd	—	—	—	Copa Libertadores	GS	—	—
1985	Final Group Stage	5	5	0	0	20	5	11 (Note: Received a 1 point bonus for finishing second in the First Stage.)	**1st**	—	—	—	Copa Libertadores	GS	—	—
1986	Torneo Regional	22	9	8	5	24	19	26	5th	DNQ	—	—	Copa Libertadores	GS	—	—
1986	Torneo Descentralizado	10	5	2	3	14	11	12	3rd	—	—	—	Copa Libertadores	GS	—	—
1987	Regional tournament	22	13	6	3	37	22	32	1st	1st (Note: Universitario won the Metropolitan first place play-off by defeating Unión Huaral.)	—	—	DNQ		(Peru) **Fidel Suárez**	20
1987	Torneo Descentralizado	30	14	13	3	46	21	41	3rd	—	—	—	DNQ		(Peru) **Fidel Suárez**	20
1987	Final Group Stage	5	3	0	2	10	5	6	3rd	—	—	—	DNQ		(Peru) **Fidel Suárez**	20
1988	Regional tournament	12	7	2	3	19	7	16	1st	—	—	—	Copa Libertadores	R2	—	—
1988	Liguilla Regional	5	3	2	0	10	1	8	1st	—	—	—	Copa Libertadores	R2	—	—
1988	Torneo Descentralizado	22	10	6	6	42	20	26	3rd	—	—	—	Copa Libertadores	R2	—	—
1988	Final Group Stage	5	2	3	0	8	3	7	2nd	2nd (Note: Universitario lost the championship play-off to Sporting Cristal.)	—	—	Copa Libertadores	R2	—	—
1989	Regional I	10	3	5	2	13	11	11	5th	—	Torneo Plácido Galindo	RU	Copa Libertadores	Ro16	—	—
1989	Regional II	10	7	2	1	24	10	16	1st	W	Torneo Plácido Galindo	RU	Copa Libertadores	Ro16	—	—
1989	Final Group Stage	5	3	2	0	12	3	8	2nd	DNQ	Torneo Plácido Galindo	RU	Copa Libertadores	Ro16	—	—
1990	Regional I	11	8	2	1	25	8	18	1st	W (Note: Universitario won a play-off match against Deportivo Junín to reach the Liguilla Final.)	—	—	DNQ		—	—
1990	Regional I - Liguilla Final	3	1	2	0	3	2	4	2nd	—	—	—	DNQ		—	—
1990	Regional II	22	11	7	4	33	12	29	3rd	W (Note: Universitario won a play-off match against Unión Tarapoto to reach the Liguilla Final.)	—	—	DNQ		—	—
1990	Regional II - Liguilla Final	3	2	0	1	6	1	4	1st	**1st** (Note: Universitario won the championship play-off against Sport Boys.)	—	—	DNQ		—	—
1991	Regional I	11	4	5	2	15	10	13	4th	W (Note: Universitario won a play-off match against Unión Huayllaspanca to reach the Liguilla Final.)	—	—	Copa Libertadores	Ro16	—	—
1991	Regional I - Liguilla Final	3	0	2	1	2	3	2	3rd	—	—	—	Copa Libertadores	Ro16	—	—
1991	Regional II	22	12	8	2	37	18	32	1st	W (Note: Universitario won a play-off match against Alianza Atlético to reach the Liguilla Final.)	—	—	Copa Libertadores	Ro16	—	—
1991	Regional II - Liguilla Final	3	1	2	0	4	3	4	2nd	2nd (Note: Universitario lost the Regional II play-off to Sporting Cristal.)	—	—	Copa Libertadores	Ro16	—	—
1992	Torneo Descentralizado	30	19	5	6	53	23	62 (Note: The league experimented with the three points for a win rule this year.)	**1st**	—	—	—	Copa CONMEBOL	Ro16	—	—
1993	Torneo Descentralizado	30	19	7	4	46	18	45	**1st**	—	Torneo Intermedio	SF	Copa Libertadores	Ro16	—	—
1994	Torneo Apertura	7	1	1	5	11	19	3	8th	—	—	—	Copa Libertadores	Ro16	—	—
1994	Torneo Descentralizado	30	19	4	7	43	20	42	2nd	—	—	—	Copa Libertadores	Ro16	—	—
1994	Final Group Stage	3	0	1	2	4	6	2 (Note: Received a 1 point bonus for finishing second in the Torneo Descentralizado.)	4th	—	—	—	Copa Libertadores	Ro16	—	—
1995	Torneo Descentralizado	44	25	9	10	70	37	84 (Note: The league permanently adopted the three points for a win rule this year.)	2nd	W (Note: Universitario won a play-off match against Alianza Lima to qualify to the 1996 Copa Libertadores.)	—	—	DNQ		—	—
1996	Torneo Descentralizado	30	16	10	4	39	20	58	3rd	W (Note: Universitario defeated Unión Minas to qualify to Liguilla.)	—	—	Copa Libertadores	GS	(Argentina) **Adrián Czornomaz** (Note: The tournament goalscorer title shared with Waldir Sáenz.)	20
1996	Liguilla	3	2	1	0	8	2	7	2nd		—	—	Copa Libertadores	GS	(Argentina) **Adrián Czornomaz**	20
1997	Torneo Apertura	13	7	4	2	19	8	25	3rd	—	—	—	Copa CONMEBOL	SF	—	—
1997	Torneo Clausura	13	8	4	1	19	7	28	2nd	—	—	—	Copa CONMEBOL	SF	—	—
1997	Continental Tournament Qualification	5	2	2	1	12	4	8	2nd	—	—	—	Copa CONMEBOL	SF	—	—
1998	Torneo Apertura	22	11	10	1	40	18	43	1st	**1st** (Note: Universitario defeated Sporting Cristal in the Championship play-offs.)	—	—	Copa Merconorte	GS	(Peru) Roberto Farfán	17
1998	Torneo Clausura	22	8	10	4	32	22	34	4th	**1st**	—	—	Copa Merconorte	GS	(Peru) Roberto Farfán	17
1999	Torneo Apertura	22	15	5	2	35	15	50	1st	**1st** (Note: Universitario defeated Alianza Lima in the Championship play-offs.)	—	—	Copa Libertadores Copa Merconorte	Ro16 GS	—	—
1999	Torneo Clausura	22	12	6	4	44	24	42	2nd	**1st**	—	—	Copa Libertadores Copa Merconorte	Ro16 GS	—	—
2000	Torneo Apertura	22	13	7	2	39	20	46	1st	**1st** (Note: Universitario won the championship by finishing first in both the Apertura and Clausura tournaments.)	—	—	Copa Libertadores Copa Merconorte	GS GS	(Brazil) **Eduardo Esidio**	37
2000	Torneo Clausura	22	17	3	2	55	23	54	1st	**1st**	—	—	Copa Libertadores Copa Merconorte	GS GS	(Brazil) **Eduardo Esidio**	37
2001	Torneo Apertura	22	8	5	9	29	30	29	8th	DNQ	—	—	Copa Libertadores Copa Merconorte	GS GS	—	—
2001	Torneo Clausura	22	8	7	7	29	24	31	6th	DNQ	—	—	Copa Libertadores Copa Merconorte	GS GS	—	—
2002	Torneo Apertura	22	15	2	5	30	17	47	1st	DNQ (Note: Universitario did not qualify to the Championship play-off because it finished below 8th place in the Clausura tournament.)	—	—	DNQ		—	—
2002	Torneo Clausura	22	4	7	11	27	36	19	11th	DNQ	—	—	DNQ		—	—
2003	Torneo Apertura	22	7	7	8	32	35	28	8th	DNQ	—	—	Copa Libertadores	GS	(Peru) Paul Cominges	15
2003	Torneo Clausura	15 (Note: A strike by the professional players cut the Clausura short. Most matches of Rounds 16 and 17 were played with under-20 and amateur players, but were later annulled.)	3	4	8	12	21	13	10th	DNQ	—	—	Copa Libertadores	GS	(Peru) Paul Cominges	15
2004	Torneo Apertura	26	11	8	7	31	25	41	5th	DNQ	—	—	DNQ		—	—
2004	Torneo Clausura	26	11	10	5	34	28	43	4th	DNQ	—	—	DNQ		—	—
2005	Torneo Apertura	24	13	9	2	40	20	48	2nd	3rd (Note: Universitario finished 1st on the tournament aggregate table but failed to qualify to the Championship play-offs.)	—	—	Copa Sudamericana	R1	—	—
2005	Torneo Clausura	24	11	7	6	31	20	40	4th	3rd	—	—	Copa Sudamericana	R1	—	—
2006	Torneo Apertura	22	8	7	7	30	22	31	6th	DNQ	—	—	Copa Libertadores	GS	—	—
2006	Torneo Clausura	22	13	2	7	40	31	41	2nd (Note: Universitario lost the Clausura tournament play-off against Cienciano.)	DNQ	—	—	Copa Libertadores	GS	—	—
2007	Torneo Apertura	22	9	5	8	31	31	32	5th	DNQ	—	—	Copa Sudamericana	R1	(Peru) **Johan Fano**	19
2007	Torneo Clausura	22	9	8	5	27	22	35	2nd	DNQ	—	—	Copa Sudamericana	R1	(Peru) **Johan Fano**	19
2008	Torneo Apertura	26	16	7	3	40	21	55	1st	3rd (Note: Universitario finished 3rd on the tournament aggregate table.)	—	—	Copa Sudamericana	PS	(Peru) Donny Neyra	16
2008	Torneo Clausura	26	8	10	8	31	32	34	11th	3rd	—	—	Copa Sudamericana	PS	(Peru) Donny Neyra	16
2009	Torneo Descentralizado	44	23	12	9	59	32	81	1st	**1st** (Note: Universitario won the championship by defeating Alianza Lima in the Championship play-offs.)	—	—	Copa Libertadores	GS	(Peru) Gianfranco Labarthe	12
2010	Torneo Descentralizado	44	21	11	12	55	31	72	4th	DNQ	—	—	Copa Libertadores	Ro16	—	—
2011	Torneo Descentralizado	30	8	10	12	25	35	34	14th	DNQ	Torneo Intermedio	R1	Copa Sudamericana	QF	(Peru) Johan Fano	10
2012	Torneo Descentralizado	44	15	13	16	52	58	57	11th (Note: Universitario was docked 1 point for outstanding debts with former assistant manager Carlos Trejos.)	DNQ	—	—	DNQ		(Uruguay) Miguel Ximénez	20
2013	Torneo Descentralizado	44	21	13	10	61	39	76	2nd (Note: Universitario was docked 1 point for outstanding debts with former assistant manager Carlos Trejos.)	**1st** (Note: Universitario won the Championship play-offs against Real Garcilaso.)	—	—	DNQ		(Peru) **Raúl Ruidíaz** (Note: The tournament goalscorer title shared with Victor Rossel.)	21
2014	Torneo Apertura	15	7	3	5	21	18	24	4th	DNQ	Torneo del Inca	GS	Copa Libertadores	GS	(Peru) Raúl Ruidíaz	14
2014	Torneo Clausura	15	6	3	6	17	17	22 (Note: Awarded 1 point as 2014 Torneo de Promoción y Reserva runner-up.)	7th	DNQ	Torneo del Inca	GS	Copa Libertadores	GS	(Peru) Raúl Ruidíaz	14
2015	Torneo Apertura	16	3	6	7	10	17	15	14th	DNQ	Torneo del Inca	GS	Copa Sudamericana	R2	(Peru) Raúl Ruidíaz	17
2015	Torneo Clausura	16	8	4	4	26	20	29 (Note: Universitario were awarded 1 point for 2015 Torneo de Promoción y Reserva success.)	4th	DNQ	Torneo del Inca	GS	Copa Sudamericana	R2	(Peru) Raúl Ruidíaz	17
2016	Torneo Descentralizado	44	20	11	13	73	61	72 (Note: Universitario were awarded 1 point for 2016 Torneo de Promoción y Reserva success.)	3rd	3rd	—	—	Copa Sudamericana	R1	(Peru) Hernán Rengifo	15
2017	Torneo de Verano	14	5	4	5	19	18	19	4th	DNQ	—	—	Copa Libertadores	R2	(Panama) Luis Tejada	18
2017	Torneo Apertura	15	7	5	3	20	14	26	5th	DNQ	—	—	Copa Libertadores	R2	(Panama) Luis Tejada	18
2017	Torneo Clausura	15	9	3	3	28	18	29 (Note: Universitario was deducted 1 point for an outstanding debt.)	4th	DNQ	—	—	Copa Libertadores	R2	(Panama) Luis Tejada	18
2018	Torneo de Verano	14	2	7	5	16	21	13	8th	DNQ	—	—	Copa Libertadores	R1	—	—
2018	Torneo Apertura	15	4	6	5	18	21	18	11th	DNQ	—	—	Copa Libertadores	R1	—	—
2018	Torneo Clausura	15	8	2	5	20	17	26	4th	DNQ	—	—	Copa Libertadores	R1	—	—
2019	Torneo Apertura	17	6	5	6	25	27	23	12th	DNQ	Copa Bicentenario	QF	DNQ		(Argentina) Germán Denis	10
2019	Torneo Clausura	17	9	6	2	16	10	33	2nd	DNQ	Copa Bicentenario	QF	DNQ		(Argentina) Germán Denis	10
2020	Torneo Apertura	19	13	4	2	38	18	42	1st	2nd (Note: Universitario lost the Championship play-offs against Sporting Cristal.)	Copa Bicentenario	— (Note: The Copa Bicentenario was canceled due to the COVID-19 pandemic.)	Copa Libertadores	R2	(Peru) Alejandro Hohberg	13
2020	Torneo Clausura	9	3	2	4	12	17	11	6th	2nd	Copa Bicentenario	—	Copa Libertadores	R2	(Peru) Alejandro Hohberg	13
2021	Fase 1	9	4	3	2	12	11	15	3rd	3rd	Copa Bicentenario	R1	Copa Libertadores	GS	(Peru) Alex Valera	13
2021	Fase 2	17	9	5	3	31	19	32	3rd	3rd	Copa Bicentenario	R1	Copa Libertadores	GS	(Peru) Alex Valera	13
2022	Torneo Apertura	18	8	4	6	24	19	28	9th	DNQ	—	—	Copa Libertadores	R2	(Peru) Alex Valera	12
2022	Torneo Clausura	18	9	6	3	26	10	33	4th	DNQ	—	—	Copa Libertadores	R2	(Peru) Alex Valera	12
2023	Torneo Apertura	18	11	1	6	29	14	34	3rd	**1st** (Note: Universitario won the Championship play-offs against Alianza Lima.)	—	—	Copa Sudamericana	KRPO	(Peru) Alex Valera	15
2023	Torneo Clausura	18	11	6	1	28	8	39	1st	**1st**	—	—	Copa Sudamericana	KRPO	(Peru) Alex Valera	15
2024	Torneo Apertura	17	12	4	1	32	7	40	1st	**1st** (Note: Since Universitario won both the Apertura and Clausura tournaments, no playoff games were played and Universitario were declared as season champions.)	—	—	Copa Libertadores	GS	(Peru) Alex Valera	13
2024	Torneo Clausura	17	11	4	2	31	10	37	1st	**1st**	—	—	Copa Libertadores	GS	(Peru) Alex Valera	13
2025	Torneo Apertura	18	12	3	3	38	12	39	1st	TBD	—	—	Copa Libertadores	Ro16	(Peru) Alex Valera (Peru) José Rivera	7
2025	Torneo Clausura									TBD	—	—	Copa Libertadores	Ro16	(Peru) Alex Valera (Peru) José Rivera	7
