= Francisco Montero (footballer, born 1952) =

Peruvian footballer (1952–2022)

Francisco "Paco" Montero
Personal information
- Full name: Francisco Montero Chunga
- Date of birth: 1 March 1952
- Place of birth: Talara, Peru
- Date of death: 27 September 2022 (aged 70)
- Place of death: Talara, Peru
- Position: Forward

Youth career
- Gaillard de Talara

Senior career*
Years	Team	Apps	(Gls)
1970–1973	Atlético Torino		
1974	Atlético Chalaco		
1975–1990	Atlético Torino		

International career
1976	Peru Olympic		

Managerial career
- 2009: Deportivo Acapulco
- * Club domestic league appearances and goals

Francisco Montero Chunga (1 March 1952 – 27 September 2022) was a Peruvian footballer who is considered an Atlético Torino club idol.

== Playing career ==
=== Club ===
He won the Copa Perú four times with Atlético Torino and was also runner-up of the 1980 Torneo Descentralizado. He also played in the 1981 Copa Libertadores.

== Managerial career ==
In 2009, he coached Deportivo Acapulco in the Provincial Stage of the Copa Perú. In 2013, he also coached a U-13 team from Talara's Municipal School who won a tour to Spain and played Real Madrid's U-13 team in a friendly match.

== Honours ==
=== Club ===
Atlético Torino

- Torneo Descentralizado: Runner-up 1980
- Copa Perú: 1970, 1975, 1977, 1982

=== Individual ===
- Torneo Descentralizado top scorer: 1984
