= 1980 Liga Mayor de Fútbol de Lima =

Liga Mayor de Fútbol de Lima
- Season: 1980
- Champions: Unión González Prada

The 1980 Liga Mayor de Fútbol de Lima (Región IX or Región Metropolitana de Lima), the second division of Peruvian football (soccer), was played by 7 teams. The tournament winner, Unión González Prada was promoted to the 1980 Copa Perú.

== League table ==
=== Standings ===
Pos	Team	Pld	W	D	L	GF	GA	GD	Pts	Promotion
1	Unión González Prada	0	0	0	0	0	0	0	0	1980 Copa Perú - National stage
2	Defensor Lima	0	0	0	0	0	0	0	0	
3	Barcelona	0	0	0	0	0	0	0	0	
4	Bata Sol	0	0	0	0	0	0	0	0	
5	Estudiantes San Roberto	0	0	0	0	0	0	0	0	
6	Papelera Atlas	0	0	0	0	0	0	0	0	
7	Centro Unión Pachacamac	0	0	0	0	0	0	0	0	
