= José Zapata =

José Zapata may refer to:

- José Antonio Zapata (1762–1837), Spanish painter
- José Zapata (baseball), baseball player and manager of the Dominican Summer League Red Sox
- José Zapata (footballer) (born 1957), Peruvian footballer
- René Higuita (José René Higuita Zapata, born 1966), Colombian footballer

== See also ==
- Zapata (surname)
