= 1982 Liga Mayor de Fútbol de Lima =

Liga Mayor de Fútbol de Lima
- Season: 1982
- Champions: Unión González Prada

The 1982 Liga Mayor de Fútbol de Lima (Región IX or Región Metropolitana de Lima), the second division of Peruvian football (soccer), was played by 7 teams. The tournament winner, Unión González Prada was promoted to the 1982 Copa Perú.

== League table ==
=== Standings ===
Pos	Team	Pld	W	D	L	GF	GA	GD	Pts	Promotion
1	Unión González Prada	0	0	0	0	0	0	0	0	1982 Copa Perú - National stage
2	Esther Grande	0	0	0	0	0	0	0	0	
3	Huracán San Isidro	0	0	0	0	0	0	0	0	
4	Barcelona	0	0	0	0	0	0	0	0	
5	Defensor Lima	0	0	0	0	0	0	0	0	
6	Aurora Miraflores	0	0	0	0	0	0	0	0	
7	Atlético Peruano	0	0	0	0	0	0	0	0	
