= 1983 Peruvian Segunda División =

Peruvian Segunda División
- Season: 1983
- Champions: Unión González Prada
- Runner up: Academia Cantolao

The 1983 Peruvian Segunda División, the second division of Peruvian football (soccer), was played by 14 teams. The tournament winner was Unión González Prada, however, this year there was no promotion to the Peruvian Primera División.

The Segunda División was contested by 14 teams invited by the Board of the Peruvian Football Federation, which decided to reactivate the Segunda División as an experimental category without promotion to the Primera División Profesional. In addition to clubs from Lima and Callao, teams from provincial areas along the northern and central coast of Peru were also included.

== Teams ==
=== Team changes ===
Invited from 1983 Ligas Distritales	Invited from 1982 Liga Mayor de Lima	Invited from 1982 Copa Perú (Hexagonal Final)	Invited from 1982 Copa Perú (Regional Stage)	Invited from 1982 Copa Perú (Departamental Stage)
▲AELU (Pueblo Libre) ▲ José Gálvez (Chimbote) ▲ Juventud La Palma (Huacho) ▲ José Gálvez (Chimbote) ▲ Lawn Tennis (Jesús María) ▲ Mariscal Sucre (Paramonga) ▲ Defensor Mayta Cápac (El Carmen) ▲ Porvenir Miraflores (Miraflores)	▲ Alcides Vigo (Barranco) ▲ Huracán San Agustín (San Isidro)	▲ Academia Cantolao (3rd) ▲ Unión González Prada (4th)	▲ Octavio Espinosa (Ica)	▲ Carlos A. Mannucci (La Libertad)

=== Stadia and locations ===
Locations of the 1983 Segunda División teams

Team	City
AELU	Pueblo Libre, Lima
Academia Cantolao	Callao
Alcides Vigo	Barranco, Lima
Carlos A. Mannucci	Trujillo
Defensor Mayta Cápac	El Carmen, Chincha
Huracán San Agustín	San Isidro, Lima
Independiente	Cañete
José Gálvez	Chimbote
Juventud La Palma	Huacho
Lawn Tennis	Jesús María, Lima
Mariscal Sucre	Paramonga
Octavio Espinosa	Ica
Porvenir Miraflores	Miraflores, Lima
Unión González Prada	Surquillo, Lima

== League table ==
=== Standings ===
Pos	Team	Pld	W	D	L	GF	GA	GD	Pts	Qualification or relegation
1	Unión González Prada (C)	26	15	6	5	35	16	+19	36	Champion
2	Academia Cantolao	26	13	7	6	31	20	+11	33	
3	Huracán San Agustín	26	9	15	2	31	24	+7	33	
4	José Gálvez	26	13	6	7	36	24	+12	32	Invited to 1984 Primera División
5	Carlos A. Mannucci	26	11	10	5	38	32	+6	32	Invited to 1984 Primera División
6	Juventud La Palma	26	11	8	7	36	29	+7	30	Invited to 1984 Primera División
7	Octavio Espinosa	26	11	6	9	28	24	+4	28	Invited to 1984 Primera División
8	AELU	26	10	7	9	32	22	+10	27	
9	Defensor Mayta Cápac	26	7	8	11	28	36	−8	22	
10	Alcides Vigo	26	6	8	12	28	33	−5	20	
11	Porvenir Miraflores	26	8	4	14	23	45	−22	20	
12	Mariscal Sucre de Paramonga	26	5	8	13	30	36	−6	18	
13	Independiente	26	3	12	11	25	42	−17	18	
14	Lawn Tennis (R)	26	4	7	15	26	45	−19	15	1984 Copa Perú

(C) Champions; (R) Relegated

== See also ==
- 1983 Torneo Descentralizado
- 1983 Copa Perú
