= José Carranza =

José Carranza may refer to:

- José Andrés Carranza (fl. 1974–1989), Peruvian football forward
- José Luis Carranza (born 1964), Peruvian football midfielder
- Jose Carranza (soccer, born 1999), American soccer midfielder
- José León de Carranza Bridge, bridge in Cádiz, Spain
