= Zapanta =

Zapanta is a surname. Notable people with the surname include:

- Albert C. Zapanta (born 1941), American businessman
- Eleuterio Zapanta (1916–1965), Filipino boxer

== See also ==
- Zapata (surname)
