= Zapata (surname) =

- Place of origin: Spain

Zapata is a Spanish surname. Notable people with the surname include:

- Antonio Zapata y Cisneros (1550–1635), Spanish Roman Catholic bishop
- Argiro Zapata (born 1971), Colombian road racing cyclist
- Bernabé Zapata Miralles (born 1997), Spanish tennis player
- Carmen Zapata (1927–2014), American actress
- Claudia E. Zapata, Chicana artist
- Cristián Zapata (born 1986), Colombian footballer
- Diego Mateo Zapata (1664 – 1745), Spanish physician and philosopher
- Duván Zapata (born 1991), Colombian footballer
- Emiliano Zapata (1879–1919), Mexican revolutionary
- Emilio Zapata Díaz (1896–1977), Chilean trade unionist and politician
- Eufemio Zapata (1873–1917), Mexican revolutionary
- Fausto Zapata (1940–2014), Mexican politician
- Franky Zapata (born 1978), French personal watercraft inventor
- Hansel Zapata (born 1995), Colombian footballer
- Hilario Zapata (born 1958), Panamanian boxer
- Hugo Zapata (1945 –2025), Colombian architect
- Isabel Zapata (born 1984), Mexican writer, editor, poet and translator
- Javier de Jesús Zapata (born 1969), Colombian road racing cyclist
- Javier Farinós, full name Francisco Javier Farinós Zapata (born 1978), Spanish footballer
- José Antonio Zapata (painter) (1762–1837), Spanish painter
- José Zapata (footballer) (born 1957), Peruvian footballer
- Karen Zapata (born 1982), Peruvian chess player
- Marcos Zapata (c. 1710–1773), Peruvian painter
- Mario Zapata Vinces (1920–unknown), Peruvian chess player
- Maria Idalia Zapata (born 1946), Colombian chess master
- Mesías Zapata (born 1981), Ecuadorian race walker
- Mia Zapata (1965–1993), American musician
- Orlando Zapata (1967–2010), Cuban human rights activist
- Pedro León Zapata (1929–2015), Venezuelan cartoonist
- Richard Sosa Zapata (born 1972), Uruguayan footballer
- Róbinson Zapata (born 1978), Colombian footballer
- Rodolfo Zapata (born 1966), Argentine footballer and football manager
- Rodolfo Zapata (singer) (1932–2019), Argentine singer-songwriter and actor
- Salvador José Zapata (1781–1854), Spanish Galician pharmacist, philanthropist in Havana
- Víctor Zapata (born 1979), Argentine footballer
- Víctor Zapata (born 1994), Colombian footballer

Fictional characters:

- Marcos Zapata, the alter-ego of the superhero Relámpago
