= 1981 Torneo Descentralizado =

Torneo Descentralizado
- Season: 1981
- Dates: 8 March 1981 – 10 February 1982
- Champions: Melgar; 1st Primera División title
- Runner up: Deportivo Municipal
- Relegated: Atlético Torino
- Copa Libertadores: Melgar; Deportivo Municipal
- Top goalscorer: José Carranza (15 goals)

The 1981 Torneo Descentralizado was the sixty-fifth season of Peruvian football. A total of 16 teams competed in the tournament. The season was divided into two phases. Melgar won its first national title and become the first club outside the Lima Region to win the title.

== Format ==
The national league was divided into two phases. The first phase divided the sixteen teams into groups. Each team was placed into one of four groups depending on the region where the club was located. This dubbed regional tournament was contested in this season because the Peru national football team was using domestic players in preparation for the 1982 World Cup Qualifiers. In order to reduce the impact of the absence of these key players in the national league, the regional tournament was played in which the winner contested the second berth to the 1982 Copa Libertadores against the Descentralizado runner-up. The second phase of the league was the Descentralizado in which all sixteen teams competed in a single league table and its winner was crowned national champion while its runner-up faced the first phase winner for the second berth of the Copa Libertadores.

== Teams ==
=== Team changes ===
Promoted from 1980 Copa Perú	Relegated from 1980 Primera División
▲ León de Huánuco (1st)	▼ Juventud La Palma (16th)

=== Stadia locations ===
Locations of the 1981 Primera División teams

Team	City	Stadium	Capacity	Field
Alfonso Ugarte	Puno	Enrique Torres Belón	20,000	Grass
Alianza Lima	La Victoria, Lima	Alejandro Villanueva	35,000	Grass
ADT	Tarma	Unión Tarma	9,000	Grass
Atlético Chalaco	Callao	Miguel Grau	15,000	Grass
Atlético Torino	Talara	Campeonísimo	8,000	Grass
CNI	Iquitos	Max Augustín	24,000	Grass
Coronel Bolognesi	Tacna	Jorge Basadre	19,850	Grass
Deportivo Junín	Huancayo	Huancayo	20,000	Grass
Deportivo Municipal	Cercado de Lima	Nacional	45,750	Grass
Juan Aurich	Chiclayo	Elías Aguirre	24,500	Grass
León de Huánuco	Huánuco	Heraclio Tapia	15,000	Grass
Melgar	Arequipa	Mariano Melgar	20,000	Grass
Sport Boys	Callao	Miguel Grau	15,000	Grass
Sporting Cristal	Rímac, Lima	Nacional	45,750	Grass
Unión Huaral	Huaral	Julio Lores Colan	10,000	Grass
Universitario	Breña, Lima	Nacional	45,750	Grass

== Torneo Regional ==
The Torneo Regional was divided into 4 groups. The groups of the North, South and Central had its group winners advance to a Provincial final group where the top two advanced to the semifinals of the regional tournament. In the Metropolitan group, the top two advanced directly to the semifinals.

=== Group stage ===
The North, Central, and South followed these rules:

- 2 points were given for a win;
- 1 point for a draw;
- No points for a loss.

==== Grupo Norte ====
Pos	Team	Pld	W	D	L	GF	GA	GD	Pts	Qualification	AUR	TOR	CNI
1	Juan Aurich	4	2	1	1	4	4	0	5			1–1	1–0
2	Atlético Torino	4	1	2	1	6	5	+1	4 (Note: Torino appealed Juan Aurich's qualification to the next round.)	Final Provincial	3–1		1–1
3	CNI	4	1	1	2	3	4	−1	3		0–0	2–1	

Source: Rsssf.org Peru 1981
Legend: Blue = home team win; Yellow = draw; Red = away team win.

==== Grupo Central ====
Pos	Team	Pld	W	D	L	GF	GA	GD	Pts	Qualification	ADT	LEO	HUA	JUN
1	ADT	6	4	1	1	13	7	+6	9	Final Provincial		2–0	2–1	2–0
2	León de Huánuco	6	3	2	1	9	8	+1	8		3–2		2–0	1–0
3	Unión Huaral	6	1	2	3	7	9	−2	4		2–2	1–1		3–0
4	Deportivo Junín	6	1	1	4	5	10	−5	3		1–2	2–2	2–0	

Source: Rsssf.org Peru 1981
Legend: Blue = home team win; Yellow = draw; Red = away team win.

==== Grupo Sur ====
Pos	Team	Pld	W	D	L	GF	GA	GD	Pts	Qualification	MEL	BOL	ALF
1	Melgar	4	2	1	1	8	6	+2	5	Final Provincial		3–1	3–1
2	Coronel Bolognesi	4	2	0	2	5	4	+1	4		2–0		2–0
3	Alfonso Ugarte	4	1	1	2	4	7	−3	3		2–2	1–0	

Source: Rsssf.org Peru 1981
Legend: Blue = home team win; Yellow = draw; Red = away team win.

==== Final Provincial ====
Pos	Team	Pld	W	D	L	GF	GA	GD	Pts	Qualification	MEL	ADT	TOR
1	Melgar	2	2	0	0	4	2	+2	4	Fase Eliminatoria		2–1	
2	ADT	2	0	1	1	2	3	−1	1	Fase Eliminatoria			1–1
3	Atlético Torino	2	0	1	1	2	3	−1	1		1–2		

Source: Rsssf.org Peru 1981
Legend: Blue = home team win; Yellow = draw; Red = away team win.

==== Grupo Metropolitano ====
This group had special rules. Matches ending in draws were decided by a penalty shootout.

- 3 points were given for a win;
- 2 points were given for a win after a penalty shootout;
- 1 point for a draw;
- No points for a loss or loss after a penalty shootout.

In addition, the top two of this group advanced to the semifinals.

Pos	Team	Pld	W	SW	SL	L	GF	GA	GD	Pts	Resv.	Total	Qualification
1	Universitario	10	5	2	0	3	13	10	+3	19	8.0	27	Fase Eliminatoria
2	Deportivo Municipal	10	6	0	1	3	13	8	+5	18	7.5	25.5	Fase Eliminatoria
3	Alianza Lima	10	6	1	0	3	13	10	+3	20	2.5	22.5	
4	Atlético Chalaco	10	3	0	1	6	8	12	−4	9	4.5	13.5	
5	Sport Boys	10	3	1	1	5	12	15	−3	11	1.0	12	
6	Sporting Cristal	10	2	1	2	5	10	14	−4	8	2.5	10.5	

- Alianza Lima did not advance to the semifinals due to a parallel reserve tournament that was favorable to Universitario (champion) and Deportivo Municipal (runner-up).

===== Results =====
Home \ Away	ALI	CHA	MUN	SBA	CRI	UNI
Alianza Lima		1–0	1–3	3–2	2–2	3–1
Atlético Chalaco	0–1		0–2	4–2	2–0	0–0
Deportivo Municipal	1–0	1–0		3–1	0–1	0–1
Sport Boys	1–0	0–1	2–0		1–1	2–1
Sporting Cristal	0–1	3–1	1–2	0–0		1–3
Universitario	0–1	2–0	1–1	2–1	2–1	

Updated to match(es) played on 1981. Source: Rsssf.org Peru 1981
Legend: Blue = home team win; Yellow = draw; Red = away team win.

=== Fase Eliminatoria ===
Semifinals
1	Deportivo Municipal	3	0	3
4	ADT	0	1	1
3	Universitario	2	0	2
2	Melgar	0	1	1

Finals
Deportivo Municipal	0	1	1
Universitario	0	1	1

==== Semifinals ====
===== First leg =====
23 May 1981	Universitario	2–0	Melgar	Estadio Teodoro Lolo Fernández, Lima
15:30	Carlos Palacios 57'; Leonardo Rumbo			Attendance: 4,932; Referee: Enrique Labo

24 May 1981	ADT	1–0	Deportivo Municipal	Estadio Unión Tarma, Tarma
15:30	Marcos Echegaray 77'			Attendance: 4,200; Referee: Edison Pérez

===== Second leg =====
27 May 1981	Melgar	1–0	Universitario	Estadio Mariano Melgar, Arequipa
16:00	Abraham Medina			Referee: Santiago Lazo

27 May 1981	Deportivo Municipal	3–0	ADT	Estadio Nacional, Lima
19:30	Hugo Sotil 40'; Jaime Drago 66'; Richard Garrido 89'			Attendance: 2,132; Referee: Sergio Leiblinger

==== Final ====
30 May 1981	Universitario	0–0	Deportivo Municipal	Estadio Teodoro Lolo Fernández, Lima
15:30				Attendance: 7,220; Referee: Juan Carlos Miranda

6 June 1981	Deportivo Municipal	1–1	Universitario	Estadio Nacional, Lima
15:00	Rodolfo Quijaite 9'		Germán Leguia 88'	Attendance: 7,643; Referee: Pedro Reyes

*No winner after two matches. Play-off was contested to determine winner.

10 June 1981	Deportivo Municipal	1–0	Universitario	Estadio Nacional, Lima
19:30	Rodulfo Manzo 87'			Attendance: 17,477; Referee: Edison Pérez

== Torneo Descentralizado ==
=== Standings ===
Pos	Team	Pld	W	D	L	GF	GA	GD	Pts	Qualification or relegation
1	Melgar (C)	30	16	8	6	39	22	+17	40	1982 Copa Libertadores
2	Universitario	30	16	7	7	48	30	+18	39	Copa Libertadores play-off
3	Alianza Lima	30	16	4	10	51	33	+18	36	
4	Alfonso Ugarte	30	14	8	8	43	32	+11	36	
5	León de Huánuco	30	10	13	7	30	30	0	33	
6	Atlético Chalaco	30	10	12	8	38	30	+8	32	
7	Sport Boys	30	9	12	9	41	37	+4	30	
8	Deportivo Junín	30	11	6	13	39	45	−6	28	
9	Sporting Cristal	30	8	12	10	30	38	−8	28	
10	CNI	30	9	9	12	35	40	−5	27	
11	Deportivo Municipal	30	8	11	11	33	41	−8	27	Copa Libertadores play-off
12	Coronel Bolognesi	30	10	6	14	29	35	−6	26	
13	Juan Aurich	30	6	14	10	21	33	−12	26	
14	ADT	30	9	7	14	27	31	−4	25	
15	Unión Huaral	30	7	10	13	28	44	−16	24	
16	Atlético Torino (R)	30	10	3	17	34	45	−11	23	1982 Copa Perú

(C) Champions; (R) Relegated

=== Results ===
Home \ Away	ADT	UGA	ALI	CHA	TOR	CNI	BOL	JUN	MUN	AUR	LEO	MEL	SBA	CRI	HUA	UNI
ADT		0–0	0–2	0–0	3–0	1–0	0–1	1–1	2–1	4–0	0–0	2–1	2–1	4–0	2–1	0–0
Alfonso Ugarte	2–0		2–0	2–2	1–1	3–0	1–0	0–0	2–0	1–0	4–0	1–3	3–0	1–0	3–0	1–2
Alianza Lima	3–0	3–3		2–1	4–0	1–2	1–0	4–0	3–0	2–0	2–0	2–0	2–0	0–1	2–1	2–1
Atlético Chalaco	1–0	3–1	2–2		2–1	0–0	2–0	2–2	3–0	1–1	1–0	0–0	2–2	0–1	3–1	1–0
Atlético Torino	2–1	1–2	0–1	1–0		4–1	0–1	2–0	2–1	1–1	0–0	0–2	1–0	2–0	4–0	2–3
CNI	1–0	1–1	3–2	1–0	2–0		1–1	6–1	1–1	0–0	2–2	1–0	2–1	2–4	4–1	0–1
Coronel Bolognesi	2–0	2–0	1–1	1–1	2–2	1–0		2–0	1–3	2–2	0–1	1–0	2–1	0–1	1–0	1–2
Deportivo Junín	1–2	1–2	2–1	3–2	3–1	2–0	3–1		2–1	4–2	1–0	0–1	0–0	3–1	3–1	1–3
Deportivo Municipal	0–0	2–4	2–1	0–2	2–3	1–0	2–1	1–0		0–0	2–2	2–1	3–1	0–1	2–2	2–2
Juan Aurich	1–0	0–1	1–0	1–0	1–0	1–1	1–1	1–0	0–0		2–2	0–0	0–1	0–0	1–0	0–1
León de Huánuco	1–0	1–1	3–2	3–1	2–1	1–0	2–1	1–1	0–0	1–1		0–0	2–0	1–1	2–0	1–0
Melgar	1–0	2–1	3–1	2–1	0–2	3–0	2–0	1–1	3–1	2–1	1–0		0–0	3–1	1–0	2–0
Sport Boys	3–1	4–0	0–0	1–1	2–0	1–0	3–1	2–1	1–1	1–1	2–0	2–2		4–4	3–0	1–2
Sporting Cristal	1–0	0–0	1–2	0–0	3–0	2–2	0–1	0–2	0–1	1–1	2–2	1–1	2–2		0–1	0–0
Unión Huaral	3–1	0–0	2–1	0–0	2–1	1–1	1–0	2–0	1–1	3–0	0–0	0–0	2–2	1–1		2–2
Universitario	1–1	4–0	0–1	2–4	3–0	3–1	2–0	2–1	0–0	3–1	2–0	1–2	0–0	2–1	3–1	

Updated to match(es) played on 1981. Source: RSSSF Peru 1981
Legend: Blue = home team win; Yellow = draw; Red = away team win.

== Copa Libertadores play-off ==
Since Melgar was declared league champion, a runner-up playoff match had to be played between the second-place teams of the Torneo Regional and the Torneo Descentralizado to determine the qualifier for the 1982 Copa Libertadores.

3 February 1982	Deportivo Municipal	2–1	Universitario	Estadio Nacional, Lima
20:00	Juan José Sato 53'; Franco Navarro 72'		Carlos Rostaing 35'	Attendance: 18,144; Referee: Edison Pérez

7 February 1982	Universitario	1–0	Deportivo Municipal	Estadio Nacional, Lima
20:00	José Cañamero 21'			Attendance: 27,610; Referee: César Pagano

*No winner after two matches. Play-off was contested to determine winner.

10 February 1982	Deportivo Municipal	3–2	Universitario	Estadio Nacional, Lima
17:30	Franco Navarro 10' 79'; Juan José Sato 37'		Carlos Carbonell 17'; Rey Muñoz 32'	Attendance: 37,625; Referee: Enrique Labó

== See also ==
- 1981 Copa Perú
