= 1983 Copa Perú =

Copa Perú
- Season: 1983
- Champions: Sport Pilsen
- Top goalscorer: Luis Mansilla (6)

The 1983 Copa Perú season (Spanish: Copa Perú 1983), the promotion tournament of Peruvian football.

In this tournament, after many qualification rounds, each one of the 24 departments in which Peru is politically divided qualified a team. Those teams, plus the team relegated from First Division on the last year, enter in two more rounds and finally 6 of them qualify for the Final round, staged in Lima (the capital).

The champion was promoted to 1984 Torneo Descentralizado.

== Finalists teams ==
The following list shows the teams that qualified for the Final Stage.

Department	Team	Location
Arequipa	Real Madrid	Camaná
Cusco	Cienciano	Cusco
La Libertad	Sport Pilsen	La Libertad
Lambayeque	Deportivo Cañaña	Lambayeque
Lima	Juventud La Joya	Chancay
Lima	Barcelona	Surquillo

== Final Stage ==
=== Standings ===
Pos	Team	Pld	W	D	L	GF	GA	GD	Pts	Promotion
1	Sport Pilsen (C)	5	3	1	1	11	5	+6	7	1984 Torneo Descentralizado
2	Cienciano	5	3	1	1	14	7	+7	7	
3	Barcelona	5	3	1	1	10	5	+5	7	
4	Juventud La Joya	5	1	2	2	5	7	−2	4	
5	Deportivo Cañaña	6	1	2	3	7	11	−4	4	
6	Real Madrid	5	0	1	4	4	16	−12	1	

(C) Champions

=== Round 1 ===
20 November 1983	Barcelona	4–1	Real Madrid	Nacional, Lima

20 November 1983	Cienciano	1–0	Juventud La Joya	Nacional, Lima

20 November 1983	Sport Pilsen	3–0	Deportivo Cañaña	Nacional, Lima

=== Round 2 ===
23 November 1983	Barcelona	2–0	Juventud La Joya	Nacional, Lima

23 November 1983	Sport Pilsen	3–1	Real Madrid	Nacional, Lima

23 November 1983	Cienciano	2–2	Deportivo Cañaña	Nacional, Lima

=== Round 3 ===
27 November 1983	Deportivo Cañaña	2–1	Real Madrid	Nacional, Lima

27 November 1983	Juventud La Joya	2–1	Sport Pilsen	Nacional, Lima

27 November 1983	Cienciano	3–1	Barcelona	Nacional, Lima

=== Round 4 ===
30 November 1983	Juventud La Joya	1–1	Real Madrid	Nacional, Lima

30 November 1983	Barcelona	3–1	Deportivo Cañaña	Nacional, Lima

30 November 1983	Sport Pilsen	4–2	Cienciano	Nacional, Lima

=== Round 5 ===
3 December 1983	Juventud La Joya	2–2	Deportivo Cañaña	Nacional, Lima

3 December 1983	Cienciano	6–0	Real Madrid	Nacional, Lima

3 December 1983	Sport Pilsen	0–0	Barcelona	Nacional, Lima

== See also ==
- 1983 Torneo Descentralizado
- 1983 Peruvian Segunda División
