= 1980 Copa Perú =

Copa Perú
- Season: 1980
- Champions: León de Huánuco
- Top goalscorer: Kulisic, Ramos, and Zuloaga (8)

The 1980 Copa Perú season (Spanish: Copa Perú 1980), the promotion tournament of Peruvian football.

In this tournament, after many qualification rounds, each one of the 24 departments in which Peru is politically divided qualified a team. Those teams, plus the team relegated from First Division on the last year, enter in two more rounds and finally 6 of them qualify for the Final round, staged in Lima (the capital).

Round robin tournament played in Lima. Six teams qualified from the Etapa Nacional. For this edition, 7 teams participated as Aguas Verdes (1979 runners-up) were invited to the Final.

The champion was promoted to 1981 Torneo Descentralizado.

== Departmental Stage ==
The following list shows the teams that qualified for the Regional Stage.

Department	Team	Location
Apurímac	Miguel Grau	Abancay
Ancash	José Gálvez	Chimbote
Arequipa	Pesca Perú	Mollendo
Cajamarca	UTC	Cajamarca
Cusco	Deportivo Garcilaso	Cusco
Huánuco	León de Huánuco	Huánuco
Huánuco	Juan Bielovucic	Huánuco
Ica	Octavio Espinosa	Ica
La Libertad	Sanjuanista	Trujillo
Lambayeque	Los Aguerridos de Monsefú	Monsefú
Lima	Unión González Prada	Lima
Loreto	Deportivo Aviación	Iquitos
Tumbes	Comercial Aguas Verdes	Zarumilla

== Regional Stage ==
=== Region I ===
Pos	Team	Pld	W	D	L	GF	GA	GD	Pts	Qualification
1	Los Aguerridos de Monsefú	0	0	0	0	0	0	0	0	National Stage
2	Sport Bellavista	0	0	0	0	0	0	0	0	
3	Leoncio Prado	0	0	0	0	0	0	0	0	

=== Region II ===
Pos	Team	Pld	W	D	L	GF	GA	GD	Pts	Qualification
1	UTC	0	0	0	0	0	0	0	0	National Stage
2	José Gálvez	0	0	0	0	0	0	0	0	
3	Sanjuanista	0	0	0	0	0	0	0	0	

=== Region III ===
Pos	Team	Pld	W	D	L	GF	GA	GD	Pts	Qualification
1	Deportivo Aviación	0	0	0	0	0	0	0	0	National Stage
2	Zona Agraria	0	0	0	0	0	0	0	0	
3	Ministerio de Transportes	0	0	0	0	0	0	0	0	

==== Tiebreaker ====
Team 1	Score	Team 2
Deportivo Aviación	2–0	Zona Agraria

=== Region IV ===
Pos	Team	Pld	W	D	L	GF	GA	GD	Pts	Qualification
1	Octavio Espinosa	0	0	0	0	0	0	0	0	National Stage
2	Independiente	0	0	0	0	0	0	0	0	
3	Atlético Ayacucho	0	0	0	0	0	0	0	0	

=== Region V ===
Pos	Team	Pld	W	D	L	GF	GA	GD	Pts	Qualification
1	Juan Bielovucic	0	0	0	0	0	0	0	0	National Stage
2	Progreso Muruhuay	0	0	0	0	0	0	0	0	
3	UNDAC	0	0	0	0	0	0	0	0	

=== Region VI ===
Pos	Team	Pld	W	D	L	GF	GA	GD	Pts	Qualification
1	Pesca Perú	0	0	0	0	0	0	0	0	National Stage
2	Química Sol	0	0	0	0	0	0	0	0	
3	La Breña	0	0	0	0	0	0	0	0	

=== Region VII ===
Pos	Team	Pld	W	D	L	GF	GA	GD	Pts	Qualification
1	Deportivo Garcilaso	0	0	0	0	0	0	0	0	National Stage
2	Carlos Varea	0	0	0	0	0	0	0	0	
3	Deportivo Maldonado	0	0	0	0	0	0	0	0	

==== Tiebreaker ====
Team 1	Score	Team 2
Deportivo Garcilaso	3–0	Carlos Varea

=== Region VIII ===
Pos	Team	Pld	W	D	L	GF	GA	GD	Pts	Qualification
1	Miguel Grau	0	0	0	0	0	0	0	0	National Stage
2	Centenario	0	0	0	0	0	0	0	0	
3	UDA	0	0	0	0	0	0	0	0	

=== Region IX ===
Pos	Team	Pld	W	D	L	GF	GA	GD	Pts	Promotion
1	Unión González Prada	0	0	0	0	0	0	0	0	National Stage
2	Defensor Lima	0	0	0	0	0	0	0	0	
3	Barcelona	0	0	0	0	0	0	0	0	
4	Bata Sol	0	0	0	0	0	0	0	0	
5	Estudiantes San Roberto	0	0	0	0	0	0	0	0	
6	Papelera Atlas	0	0	0	0	0	0	0	0	
7	Centro Unión Pachacamac	0	0	0	0	0	0	0	0	

== National Stage ==
=== Group I ===
Pos	Team	Pld	W	D	L	GF	GA	GD	Pts	Qualification	AGU	AVI	UTC
1	Los Aguerridos de Monsefú	4	1	2	1	6	6	0	4	Final Stage		3–3	2–0
2	Deportivo Aviación	4	1	2	1	6	7	−1	4	Final Stage	1–1		2–1
3	UTC	4	2	0	2	5	4	+1	4		2–0	2–0	

Legend: Blue = home team win; Yellow = draw; Red = away team win.

=== Group II ===
Pos	Team	Pld	W	D	L	GF	GA	GD	Pts	Qualification	UGP	LEO	OCT	BIE
1	Unión González Prada	6	3	2	1	5	2	+3	8	Final Stage		1–1	2–0	1–0
2	León de Huánuco	6	2	4	0	4	2	+2	8	Final Stage	1–0		0–0	1–1
3	Octavio Espinosa	6	1	4	1	4	4	0	6		0–0	0–0		1–1
4	Juan Bielovucic	6	0	2	4	3	8	−5	2		0–1	0–1	1–3	

Legend: Blue = home team win; Yellow = draw; Red = away team win.

=== Group III ===
Pos	Team	Pld	W	D	L	GF	GA	GD	Pts	Qualification	GAR	PES	MIG
1	Deportivo Garcilaso	4	2	1	1	8	4	+4	5	Final Stage		3–0	5–1
2	Pesca Perú	4	2	0	2	4	4	0	4	Final Stage	3–0		1–0
3	Miguel Grau	4	1	1	2	2	6	−4	3		0–0	1–0	

Legend: Blue = home team win; Yellow = draw; Red = away team win.

== Final Stage ==
=== Standings ===
Pos	Team	Pld	W	D	L	GF	GA	GD	Pts	Promotion
1	León de Huánuco (C)	6	4	2	0	8	2	+6	10	1981 Primera División
2	Unión González Prada	6	3	2	1	6	4	+2	8	Promotion play-off
3	Los Aguerridos de Monsefú	6	2	3	1	6	4	+2	7	
4	Pesca Perú	6	1	3	2	5	6	−1	5	
5	Deportivo Aviación	6	2	1	3	5	9	−4	5	
6	Comercial Aguas Verdes	6	0	4	2	3	5	−2	4	
7	Deportivo Garcilaso	6	1	1	4	5	8	−3	3	

(C) Champions

==== Round 1 ====
26 October 1980	León de Huánuco	3–0	Unión González Prada	Nacional, Lima

26 October 1980	Pesca Perú	2–1	Deportivo Garcilaso	Nacional, Lima

26 October 1980	Deportivo Aviación	1–1	Comercial Aguas Verdes	Nacional, Lima

==== Round 2 ====
30 October 1980	Deportivo Aviación	1–0	Pesca Perú	Nacional, Lima

30 October 1980	León de Huánuco	2–0	Deportivo Garcilaso	Nacional, Lima

30 October 1980	Los Aguerridos de Monsefú	1–1	Comercial Aguas Verdes	Nacional, Lima

==== Round 3 ====
2 November 1980	Deportivo Aviación	2–1	Deportivo Garcilaso	Nacional, Lima

2 November 1980	Pesca Perú	0–0	Comercial Aguas Verdes	Nacional, Lima

2 November 1980	Los Aguerridos de Monsefú	1–0	Unión González Prada	Nacional, Lima

==== Round 4 ====
5 November 1980	Comercial Aguas Verdes	0–0	Deportivo Garcilaso	Nacional, Lima

5 November 1980	Unión González Prada	1–0	Deportivo Aviación	Nacional, Lima

5 November 1980	León de Huánuco	0–0	Los Aguerridos de Monsefú	Nacional, Lima

==== Round 5 ====
9 November 1980	Unión González Prada	1–0	Comercial Aguas Verdes	Nacional, Lima

9 November 1980	León de Huánuco	1–0	Pesca Perú	Nacional, Lima

9 November 1980	Los Aguerridos de Monsefú	3–0	Deportivo Aviación	Nacional, Lima

==== Round 6 ====
12 November 1980	Unión González Prada	2–1	Deportivo Garcilaso	Nacional, Lima

12 November 1980	León de Huánuco	3–1	Deportivo Aviación	Nacional, Lima

12 November 1980	Los Aguerridos de Monsefú	1–1	Pesca Perú	Nacional, Lima

==== Round 7 ====
16 November 1980	Deportivo Garcilaso	2–0	Los Aguerridos de Monsefú	Nacional, Lima

16 November 1980	Unión González Prada	2–2	Pesca Perú	Nacional, Lima

16 November 1980	León de Huánuco	2–1	Comercial Aguas Verdes	Nacional, Lima

== Promotion play-off ==
The Promotion Play-off was contested between Coronel Bolognesi, who finished second-to-last in the 1980 Torneo Descentralizado, and Unión González Prada, runners-up of the 1980 Copa Perú. The Tacna-based side secured a convincing 5-0 aggregate victory, thereby retaining their place in the top division. Meanwhile, the Lima-based club missed out on what was arguably its best opportunity to earn promotion to the First Division.

1 February 1981
16:00

Unión González Prada	0–2	Coronel Bolognesi
		Américo Nieri 1'; Enrique Boné

Estadio Alejandro Villanueva, Lima
Attendance: 6,075
Referee: Enrique Labo
8 February 1981
15:30

Coronel Bolognesi	3–0	Unión González Prada
Victorino Vicente 52'; Orlando Pérez 59' (o.g.); José Zevallos 74'

Estadio Jorge Basadre, Tacna

== See also ==
- 1980 Torneo Descentralizado
