= José Andrés Carranza =

Peruvian footballer

Personal information
- Full name: José Andrés Carranza
- Place of birth: Peru
- Position: Forward

Senior career*
| Years | Team | Apps | (Gls) |
| 1974–1977 | Defensor Lima | | |
| 1978 | Juan Aurich | | |
| 1979 | Coronel Bolognesi | | |
| 1980–1984 | Alianza Lima | | |
| 1985–1986 | CNI | | |
| 1987–1988 | Juventud La Palma | | |
| 1989 | L.D.U. Portoviejo | | |
| ? | Hijos de Yurimaguas | | |
| ? | Bella Esperanza | | |

International career
| 1976 | Peru | 2 | (0) |
- * Club domestic league appearances and goals

José Andrés Carranza is a retired Peruvian professional football player. He is a former Peru international, and was known as "Caté" or "La Chancha". He was the top scorer of the 1981 Torneo Descentralizado with 15 goals.

== Club career ==
A powerful centre forward, Carranza started his professional career in 1975, playing the 1975 Torneo Descentralizado for Defensor Lima. He stayed with the club until 1977, and he then moved to Juan Aurich, where he played one season. After having played the 1979 Torneo Descentralizado for Coronel Bolognesi he was transferred to Alianza Lima. He became one of Alianza's top goalscorers, and became the top scorer of the Peruvian championship in 1981. He also had the chance to make his debut in Copa Libertadores. In 1984, he left Alianza for CNI, a team based in Iquitos, and he stayed there from 1985 to 1986. He then moved to Juventud La Palma.

== International career ==
Carranza played 2 international games for Peru: on October 12, 1976 against Uruguay and on October 28, 1976 against Argentina.
