= 1982 Torneo Descentralizado =

Torneo Descentralizado
- Season: 1982
- Dates: 18 July 1982 – 12 February 1983
- Champions: Universitario; 6th Descentralizado title 9th professional title 16th Primera División title
- Runner up: Alianza Lima
- Relegated: none
- Copa Libertadores: Universitario; Alianza Lima
- Top goalscorer: Percy Rojas (19 goals)

The 1982 Torneo Descentralizado was the sixty-sixth season of Peruvian football. A total of 16 teams competed in the tournament. The season was divided into several stages. Universitario won its sixteenth first division title.

== Teams ==
=== Team changes ===
Promoted from 1981 Copa Perú	Relegated from 1981 Primera División
▲UTC (1st)	▼ Atlético Torino (16th)

=== Stadia locations ===
Locations of the 1982 Primera División teams

Team	City	Stadium	Capacity	Field
Alfonso Ugarte	Puno	Enrique Torres Belón	20,000	Grass
Alianza Lima	La Victoria, Lima	Alejandro Villanueva	35,000	Grass
ADT	Tarma	Unión Tarma	9,000	Grass
Atlético Chalaco	Callao	Miguel Grau	15,000	Grass
CNI	Iquitos	Max Augustín	24,000	Grass
Coronel Bolognesi	Tacna	Jorge Basadre	19,850	Grass
Deportivo Junín	Huancayo	Huancayo	20,000	Grass
Deportivo Municipal	Cercado de Lima	Nacional	45,750	Grass
Juan Aurich	Chiclayo	Elías Aguirre	24,500	Grass
León de Huánuco	Huánuco	Heraclio Tapia	15,000	Grass
Melgar	Arequipa	Mariano Melgar	20,000	Grass
Sport Boys	Callao	Miguel Grau	15,000	Grass
Sporting Cristal	Rímac, Lima	Nacional	45,750	Grass
Unión Huaral	Huaral	Julio Lores Colan	10,000	Grass
UTC	Cajamarca	Heroes de San Ramón	15,000	Grass
Universitario	Breña, Lima	Nacional	45,750	Grass

== Regional stage ==
=== Zona Centro ===
Pos	Team	Pld	W	D	L	GF	GA	GD	Pts	Qualification
1	Sporting Cristal	20	9	8	3	30	18	+12	26	Second Stage
2	Alianza Lima	20	7	9	4	22	13	+9	23	Second Stage
3	Universitario	20	8	7	5	28	20	+8	23	Second Stage
4	Deportivo Municipal	20	6	8	6	21	19	+2	20	Second Stage
5	Atlético Chalaco	20	5	5	10	13	30	−17	15	Liguilla Descenso
6	Sport Boys	20	2	9	9	11	25	−14	13	Liguilla Descenso

==== Results ====
===== Matches 1–10 =====
Home \ Away	ALI	CHA	MUN	SBA	CRI	UNI
Alianza Lima		0–1	1–1	0–0	1–1	1–1
Atlético Chalaco	0–2		3–2	0–0	1–1	0–0
Deportivo Municipal	0–0	0–1		1–1	0–0	0–3
Sport Boys	1–1	1–2	0–3		2–4	1–1
Sporting Cristal	0–0	3–0	2–2	0–0		3–2
Universitario	0–1	1–0	1–2	1–0	1–1	

Updated to match(es) played on unknown. Source:
Legend: Blue = home team win; Yellow = draw; Red = away team win.

===== Matches 11–20 =====
Home \ Away	ALI	CHA	MUN	SBA	CRI	UNI
Alianza Lima		2–0	0–1	3–0	0–1	2–1
Atlético Chalaco	2–1		0–2	0–0	0–2	0–3
Deportivo Municipal	0–0	3–1		0–1	0–1	1–1
Sport Boys	0–3	2–2	0–1		0–1	0–1
Sporting Cristal	1–2	4–0	1–0	1–1		2–4
Universitario	2–2	1–0	2–2	0–1	2–1	

Updated to match(es) played on unknown. Source:
Legend: Blue = home team win; Yellow = draw; Red = away team win.

=== Zona Norte ===
Pos	Team	Pld	W	D	L	GF	GA	GD	Pts	Qualification
1	Juan Aurich	16	7	5	4	19	13	+6	19	Second Stage
2	Unión Huaral	16	7	4	5	20	12	+8	18	Second Stage
3	UTC	16	6	5	5	7	16	−9	17	Second Stage
4	León de Huánuco	16	5	4	7	13	17	−4	14	Liguilla Descenso
5	CNI	16	5	2	9	16	17	−1	12	Liguilla Descenso

==== Results ====
===== Matches 1–8 =====
Home \ Away	CNI	JAU	LEÓ	HUA	UTC
CNI		2–0	0–0	2–0	4–0
Juan Aurich	2–0		2–0	2–1	2–0
León de Huánuco	2–1	1–1		2–1	2–0
Unión Huaral	1–0	1–1	3–0		1–1
UTC	1–0	1–0	0–0	0–0	

Updated to match(es) played on unknown. Source:
Legend: Blue = home team win; Yellow = draw; Red = away team win.

===== Matches 9–16 =====
Home \ Away	CNI	JAU	LEÓ	HUA	UTC
CNI		2–1	0–0	1–2	3–0
Juan Aurich	2–1		1–0	0–0	0–0
León de Huánuco	3–0	2–4		1–0	0–1
Unión Huaral	2–0	2–1	2–0		4–0
UTC	1–0	0–0	1–0	1–0	

Updated to match(es) played on unknown. Source:
Legend: Blue = home team win; Yellow = draw; Red = away team win.

=== Zona Sur ===
Pos	Team	Pld	W	D	L	GF	GA	GD	Pts	Qualification
1	Coronel Bolognesi	16	8	7	1	24	9	+15	23	Second Stage
2	ADT	16	7	6	3	14	13	+1	20	Second Stage
3	Melgar	16	8	3	5	20	8	+12	19	Second Stage
4	Alfonso Ugarte	16	2	5	9	13	26	−13	9	Liguilla Descenso
5	Deportivo Junín	16	2	5	9	10	25	−15	9	Liguilla Descenso

==== Results ====
===== Matches 1–8 =====
Home \ Away	ADT	ALF	BOL	JUN	MEL
ADT		2–1	0–0	3–0	0–0
Alfonso Ugarte	2–2		1–1	1–1	0–1
Coronel Bolognesi	3–1	2–1		0–0	1–1
Deportivo Junín	0–1	3–3	2–2		0–2
Melgar	0–1	4–0	1–1	3–0	

Updated to match(es) played on unknown. Source:
Legend: Blue = home team win; Yellow = draw; Red = away team win.

===== Matches 9–16 =====
Home \ Away	ADT	ALF	BOL	JUN	MEL
ADT		1–1	0–0	0–0	1–0
Alfonso Ugarte	0–1		0–3	2–1	1–0
Coronel Bolognesi	3–0	2–0		3–0	1–0
Deportivo Junín	0–1	1–0	0–2		2–0
Melgar	3–0	1–0	2–0	2–0	

Updated to match(es) played on unknown. Source:
Legend: Blue = home team win; Yellow = draw; Red = away team win.

== Second stage ==
=== Group A ===
Pos	Team	Pld	W	D	L	GF	GA	GD	Pts	Qualification	JAU	MUN	HUA	CRI	UTC
1	Juan Aurich	8	4	3	1	12	7	+5	11	Liguilla Final		0–0	1–1	2–1	2–0
2	Deportivo Municipal	8	4	2	2	12	6	+6	10	Liguilla Final	2–1		0–0	1–0	5–0
3	Unión Huaral	8	3	3	2	11	9	+2	9		2–2	1–0		1–0	2–3
4	Sporting Cristal	8	2	1	5	10	11	−1	5		1–2	1–2	1–0		2–2
5	UTC	8	2	1	5	11	23	−12	5		0–2	3–2	2–4	1–4	

Legend: Blue = home team win; Yellow = draw; Red = away team win.

=== Group B ===
Pos	Team	Pld	W	D	L	GF	GA	GD	Pts	Qualification	ALI	UNI	BOL	MEL	ADT
1	Alianza Lima	8	4	2	2	7	4	+3	10	Liguilla Final		2–0	2–0	1–0	1–0
2	Universitario	8	2	5	1	9	7	+2	9	Liguilla Final	1–1		2–2	3–1	2–0
3	Coronel Bolognesi	8	3	2	3	11	10	+1	8		1–0	0–0		1–0	4–1
4	Melgar	8	3	2	3	7	7	0	8		2–0	1–1	2–1		0–0
5	ADT	8	1	3	4	4	10	−6	5		0–0	0–0	3–2	0–1	

Legend: Blue = home team win; Yellow = draw; Red = away team win.

== Liguilla Final ==
=== Standings ===
Pos	Team	Pld	W	D	L	GF	GA	GD	Pts	Qualification	UNI	ALI	JA	MUN
1	Universitario (C)	3	3	0	0	5	2	+3	6	1983 Copa Libertadores			2–1	
2	Alianza Lima	3	2	0	1	3	2	+1	4	1983 Copa Libertadores	1–2		1–0	
3	Juan Aurich	3	0	1	2	3	5	−2	1					2–2
4	Deportivo Municipal	3	0	1	2	2	4	−2	1		0–1	0–1		

Legend: Blue = home team win; Yellow = draw; Red = away team win.
(C) Champions

=== Results ===
5 February 1983	Universitario	2–1	Juan Aurich	Estadio Nacional, Lima
18:00	Juan José Oré 34' 52'		Percy Vílchez 74'

5 February 1983	Deportivo Municipal	0–1	Alianza Lima	Estadio Nacional, Lima
20:00			Juan Illescas 75'	Attendance: 9,704; Referee: Sergio Leiblinger

9 February 1983	Juan Aurich	2–2	Deportivo Municipal	Estadio Nacional, Lima
18:30	Juan Mendoza 48'; Arnaldo Cadenillas 75'		Santiago Ojeda 45'; Franco Navarro 78'

9 February 1983	Alianza Lima	1–2	Universitario	Estadio Nacional, Lima
20:30	Guillermo La Rosa 50'		Germán Leguía 46' (pen.); Percy Rojas 50'	Attendance: 29,189; Referee: Edison Pérez

12 February 1983	Alianza Lima	1–0	Juan Aurich	Estadio Nacional, Lima
18:30	Raúl Mejía 88'			Referee: César Pagano

12 February 1983	Deportivo Municipal	0–1	Universitario	Estadio Nacional, Lima
20:30			Hugo Gastulo 51'	Referee: Enrique Labó

== Liguilla Descenso ==
=== Standings ===
Pos	Team	Pld	W	D	L	GF	GA	GD	Pts	Promotion or relegation	LEÓ	SBA	CHA	CNI	ALF	JUN
1	León de Huánuco	9	5	4	0	8	2	+6	14			1–0	n.p.	1–0	2–1	1–0
2	Sport Boys	10	3	6	1	9	6	+3	12		0–0		0–0	2–1	2–1	0–0
3	Atlético Chalaco	9	3	4	2	12	4	+8	10		0–0	1–1		0–1	4–1	6–0
4	CNI	10	4	2	4	12	9	+3	10		1–1	0–0	1–0		1–2	5–1
5	Alfonso Ugarte	10	3	3	4	11	15	−4	9		0–0	2–2	0–0	2–0		2–1
6	Deportivo Junín (O)	10	1	1	8	5	21	−16	3	Promotion/relegation play-off	0–2	0–2	0–1	0–2	3–0	

Legend: Blue = home team win; Yellow = draw; Red = away team win.
(O) Play-off winners

== Promotion/relegation play-off ==
The Promotion/relegation play-off was contested between Deportivo Junín, who finished last in the 1982 Torneo Descentralizado, and Ramón Castilla of La Oroya, champions of the 1981 Liga Departamental de Junín. Deportivo Junín emerged as the clear winners with an emphatic 7-1 aggregate score, thereby securing their place in the top division.

23 February 1983	Ramón Castilla (La Oroya)	1–2	Deportivo Junín	Estadio Monumental, Jauja
15:30

27 February 1983	Deportivo Junín	5–0	Ramón Castilla (La Oroya)	Estadio IV Centenario, Huancayo
15:30	Falla 5'; León 44' 48' 63'; Arnáez 71'			Attendance: 3,052; Referee: César Pagano

== See also ==
- 1982 Copa Perú
