= José Zapata (footballer) =

Peruvian footballer (born 1957)

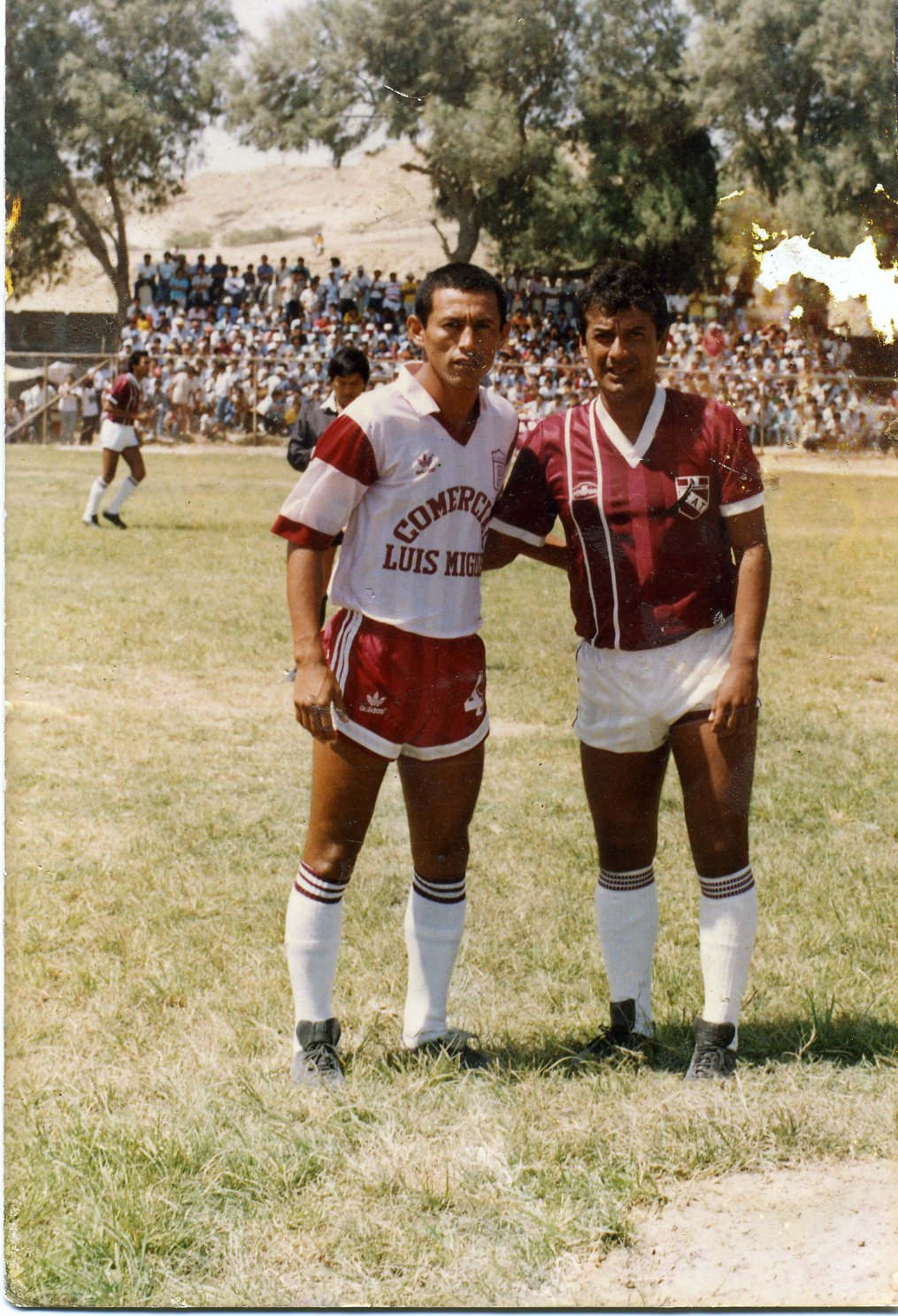
- José Zapata (to the right)

Personal information
- Full name: José Augusto Zapata Guzmán
- Date of birth: 20 July 1957 (age 69)
- Place of birth: Talara, Peru
- Position: Forward

Senior career*
Years	Team	Apps	(Gls)
?–1981	Atlético Torino		
1982–1983	Universitario		
1983–1987	Atlético Torino		
1988	Alianza Atlético		
1990–1991	Atlético Torino		
1993–1994	Alianza Atlético		
1995	Atlético Torino		

International career
1980	Peru Olympic		
1980–1984	Peru	3	(0)
- * Club domestic league appearances and goals

José Augusto Zapata Guzmán (born on 20 July 1957), nicknamed Pata de rana (frog foot), is a Peruvian professional footballer who played as forward.

== Playing career ==
=== Club career ===
A key player for Atlético Torino in his hometown of Talara, where he played on several occasions in the 1970s, 1980s and 1990s, José Zapata was renowned for his goals from corners or from midfield. A Peruvian league runner-up in 1980, he participated in the 1981 Copa Libertadores (five matches) with Atlético Torino.

In 1982, he moved to Universitario de Deportes of Lima, where he won the league title that season. He played in the 1983 Copa Libertadores with this club (one match).

He also played twice for Alianza Atlético of Sullana, in 1988 and between 1993 and 1994.

=== International career ===
A Peruvian international, José Zapata played three matches for the Peruvian national team (without scoring any goals) between 1980 and 1984. He had previously played with the Peruvian Olympic team in the 1980 CONMEBOL Pre-Olympic Tournament.

== Honours ==
Atlético Torino

- Copa Perú (2): 1975, 1977

Universitario de Deportes

- Torneo Descentralizado: 1982
