= Víctor Zapata (footballer, born 1994) =

Association football player

Personal information
- Full name: Víctor Manuel Zapata Caicedo
- Date of birth: 29 September 1994 (age 32)
- Place of birth: Colombia
- Position: Forward

Youth career
- Tottenham

Senior career*
Years	Team	Apps	(Gls)
2014	Banbury United		
2015	Baník	3	(0)
2016	Welling United	3	(0)
2017–2018	Atlético FC	6	(0)
2019–2020	KRC Gent		
- * Club domestic league appearances and goals

Víctor Manuel Zapata Caicedo (born 29 September 1994) is a Colombian former footballer who played as an attacker.

== Career ==
=== Club career ===
As a youth player, Zapata joined the youth academy of English Premier League side Tottenham. In 2014, he signed for Banbury United in the English seventh tier. Before the second half of 2014–15, Zapata signed for Czech top flight club Baník, where he made 3 league appearances and scored 0 goals. On 24 April 2015, he debuted for Baník during a 0–2 loss to Vysočina.

Before the second half of 2015–16, Zapata signed for Welling United in the English fifth tier. In 2017, he signed for Colombian second tier team Atlético FC. In 2019, he signed for KRC Gent in Belgium.
