= 1983 Torneo Descentralizado =

Torneo Descentralizado
- Season: 1983
- Dates: 17 April 1983 – 21 December 1983
- Champions: Sporting Cristal (8th title)
- Runner up: Melgar
- Relegated: Juan Aurich; León de Huánuco
- Copa Libertadores: Sporting Cristal; Melgar
- Matches: 287
- Goals: 646 (2.25 per match)
- Top goalscorer: Juan Caballero (29 goals)

The 1983 Torneo Descentralizado, the top tier of Peruvian football (soccer), was played by 17 teams. The national champion was Sporting Cristal.

Top 6 from First Stage played in Lima for the Championship without carrying their whole season record; top 3 entered that round with Bonus of 3, 2, and 1 point respectively. For 1984 First Division grew to 25 teams. So besides Sport Pilsen which gained the right to be promoted, 9 other teams were invited to join First Division.

== Teams ==
=== Team changes ===
Promoted from
1982 Copa Perú
▲ Atlético Torino (1st)

=== Stadia locations ===
Locations of the 1983 Primera División teams

Team	City	Stadium	Capacity	Field
Alfonso Ugarte	Puno	Enrique Torres Belón	20,000	Grass
Alianza Lima	La Victoria, Lima	Alejandro Villanueva	35,000	Grass
ADT	Tarma	Unión Tarma	9,000	Grass
Atlético Chalaco	Callao	Miguel Grau	15,000	Grass
Atlético Torino	Talara	Campeonísimo	8,000	Grass
CNI	Iquitos	Max Augustín	24,000	Grass
Coronel Bolognesi	Tacna	Jorge Basadre	19,850	Grass
Deportivo Municipal	Cercado de Lima	Nacional	45,750	Grass
Huancayo	Huancayo	Huancayo	20,000	Grass
Juan Aurich	Chiclayo	Elías Aguirre	24,500	Grass
León de Huánuco	Huánuco	Heraclio Tapia	15,000	Grass
Melgar	Arequipa	Mariano Melgar	20,000	Grass
Sport Boys	Callao	Miguel Grau	15,000	Grass
Sporting Cristal	Rímac, Lima	Nacional	45,750	Grass
Unión Huaral	Huaral	Julio Lores Colan	10,000	Grass
UTC	Cajamarca	Héroes de San Ramón	18,000	Grass
Universitario	Breña, Lima	Nacional	45,750	Grass

== First stage ==
=== Standings ===
Pos	Team	Pld	W	D	L	GF	GA	GD	Pts	Qualification or relegation
1	Melgar	32	19	6	7	37	20	+17	44	Liguilla Final, Bonus +3
2	Sporting Cristal	32	14	13	5	59	31	+28	41	Liguilla Final, Bonus +2
3	Universitario	32	13	14	5	43	20	+23	40	Liguilla Final, Bonus +1
4	CNI	32	14	12	6	43	27	+16	40	Liguilla Final
5	Deportivo Municipal	32	14	12	6	43	33	+10	40	Liguilla Final
6	Atlético Torino	32	17	5	10	53	36	+17	39	Liguilla Final
7	Sport Boys	32	14	10	8	39	29	+10	38	
8	UTC	32	11	11	10	31	30	+1	33	
9	Alianza Lima	32	10	11	11	36	32	+4	31	
10	ADT	32	10	9	13	34	39	−5	29	
11	Atlético Chalaco	32	8	12	12	24	33	−9	28	
12	Coronel Bolognesi	32	8	11	13	31	38	−7	27	
13	Unión Huaral	32	7	11	14	24	43	−19	25	
14	Huancayo	32	9	6	17	24	42	−18	24	
15	Alfonso Ugarte	32	8	7	17	29	57	−28	23	
16	Juan Aurich (R)	32	8	6	18	27	43	−16	22	1984 División Intermedia
17	León de Huánuco (R)	32	5	10	17	19	43	−24	20	1984 División Intermedia

(R) Relegated

=== Results ===
Home \ Away	ADT	UGA	ALI	CHA	TOR	CNI	BOL	MUN	HYO	AUR	LEO	MEL	SBA	CRI	HUA	UTC	UNI
ADT		4–1	3–0	1–0	2–1	1–0	1–1	0–0	3–0	0–1	0–0	1–2	0–1	1–3	5–2	1–1	1–0
Alfonso Ugarte	0–1		0–0	1–1	2–0	0–1	0–2	2–0	1–0	5–2	2–0	1–0	0–0	2–2	2–0	0–0	0–0
Alianza Lima	6–1	3–0		0–0	3–0	1–1	0–0	1–1	1–0	2–1	2–0	0–1	2–0	0–0	1–0	1–0	1–2
Atlético Chalaco	2–1	2–0	0–0		0–2	1–4	0–1	1–1	2–0	2–1	1–0	1–1	1–2	0–0	0–0	1–1	1–1
Atlético Torino	3–0	4–1	2–1	1–0		3–0	1–1	1–1	3–1	4–0	1–0	2–0	1–0	0–2	3–0	2–0	2–0
CNI	2–1	3–1	2–0	2–0	2–2		1–0	4–1	0–0	0–0	6–0	2–0	0–0	1–1	3–1	1–0	2–2
Coronel Bolognesi	1–0	4–3	1–1	1–2	1–2	3–1		0–0	2–1	1–0	0–1	0–1	0–2	0–1	1–1	2–2	1–1
Deportivo Municipal	2–2	3–0	2–2	1–1	3–2	1–0	0–0		2–1	4–2	2–0	1–1	2–0	2–1	1–1	1–0	0–2
Huancayo	1–1	2–0	1–0	1–0	3–2	1–0	2–1	2–0		1–0	0–2	1–1	1–2	0–0	0–0	0–2	1–5
Juan Aurich	2–0	2–0	3–1	0–2	0–0	1–2	1–1	0–1	1–0		3–0	0–1	0–1	1–0	4–1	0–0	0–2
León de Huánuco	1–0	2–3	1–1	1–1	2–3	1–1	1–1	1–2	0–0	0–0		0–1	1–1	1–0	2–0	0–0	0–1
Melgar	3–0	2–1	2–0	0–1	1–0	3–0	1–0	1–0	1–0	3–2	3–0		0–1	0–1	2–0	1–1	1–0
Sport Boys	0–0	4–1	0–2	2–0	3–2	0–0	1–2	0–4	5–1	1–1	2–1	0–1		3–0	2–0	2–1	1–1
Sporting Cristal	1–0	5–2	2–2	2–0	4–1	2–2	4–2	4–1	4–0	2–1	6–1	1–1	1–1		6–1	1–1	1–1
Unión Huaral	1–1	0–0	1–0	1–1	0–0	0–0	1–0	0–1	2–1	1–0	2–0	0–1	2–1	1–1		4–1	0–0
UTC	1–2	5–2	3–1	2–0	3–0	0–1	3–0	1–3	2–0	2–0	2–0	1–1	0–0	1–0	1–0		0–0
Universitario	0–0	5–0	2–1	2–0	2–3	0–0	2–1	0–0	0–1	3–0	0–0	2–0	1–1	1–1	2–0	3–0	

Updated to match(es) played on 1983. Source: RSSSF Peru 1983
Legend: Blue = home team win; Yellow = draw; Red = away team win.

== Liguilla Final ==
=== Standings ===
Pos	Team	Pld	W	D	L	GF	GA	GD	BP	Pts	Qualification	CRI	MEL	UNI	MUN	CNI	TOR
1	Sporting Cristal (C)	5	5	0	0	13	4	+9	2	12	1984 Copa Libertadores		4–1	3–1	1–0		
2	Melgar	5	2	2	1	11	11	0	3	9	1984 Copa Libertadores					3–1	2–2
3	Universitario	5	2	2	1	9	8	+1	1	7			3–3		1–1	2–0	
4	Deportivo Municipal	5	2	1	2	7	5	+2	0	5			1–2				3–0
5	CNI	5	1	0	4	5	9	−4	0	2		0–2			1–2		3–0
6	Atlético Torino	5	0	1	4	5	13	−8	0	1		2–3		1–2			

Source: Rsssf.org Peru 1983
Legend: Blue = home team win; Yellow = draw; Red = away team win.
(C) Champions

=== Results ===
8 December 1983	Melgar	2–2	Atlético Torino	Estadio Nacional, Lima
15:00	César Echeandía 65'; Suárez 74'		Montero 64'; Reynaldo Jaime 73'	Referee: Carlos Montalván

8 December 1983	Universitario	2–0	CNI	Estadio Nacional, Lima
17:00	Freddy Ternero 24'; Percy Rojas 55'			Referee: César Pagano

8 December 1983	Sporting Cristal	1–0	Deportivo Municipal	Estadio Nacional, Lima
19:00	Juan Caballero 35'			Attendance: 21,045; Referee: Sergio Leiblinger

11 December 1983	CNI	0–2	Sporting Cristal	Estadio Nacional, Lima
15:00			Juan Caballero 61'; Julio Aliaga 72'

11 December 1983	Atlético Torino	1–2	Universitario	Estadio Nacional, Lima
17:00	Francisco Montero 16'		Hugo Gastulo 5'; Martin Duffo 84'	Referee: Alfonso Postigo

11 December 1983	Deportivo Municipal	1–2	Melgar	Estadio Nacional, Lima
19:00	Alberto Castillo 19'		José Aguayo 55'; Genaro Neyra 81'	Attendance: 19,105; Referee: Edison Pérez

15 December 1983	Deportivo Municipal	3–0	Atlético Torino	Estadio Nacional, Lima
15:30	Franco Navarro 20'

15 December 1983	Melgar	3–1	CNI	Estadio Nacional, Lima
17:30	Genaro Neyra 30' 32'; Ángel Gutiérrez 83'		Martín Gago 46'	Referee: Enrique Labó

15 December 1983	Sporting Cristal	3–1	Universitario	Estadio Nacional, Lima
20:00	Jorge Hirano 61' 89'; Pedro Ruiz 79'		Juan José Oré 40'

18 December 1983	CNI	1–2	Deportivo Municipal	Estadio Nacional, Lima
15:00	Martín Gago 60'		Franco Navarro 40'; Rufino Bernales 55'	Referee: Alfonso Postigo

18 December 1983	Atlético Torino	2–3	Sporting Cristal	Estadio Nacional, Lima
17:00	Francisco Montero 18' 56'		Juan Caballero 32'; Enrique Boné 34'; Pedro Ruiz	Referee: César Pagano

18 December 1983	Universitario	3–3	Melgar	Estadio Nacional, Lima
19:00	Carlos Palacios 35'; Julio Cesar Antón 66'; Percy Rojas 78'		Víctor Gutiérrez 30'; Ángel Gutiérrez 36'; Walter Almonte 89'	Attendance: 23,845; Referee: Sergio Leiblinger

21 December 1983	Universitario	1–1	Deportivo Municipal	Estadio Teodoro Lolo Fernández, Lima
15:30	Jaime Drago 14'		Alberto Castillo 90'	Referee: Alfonso Postigo

21 December 1983	CNI	3–0	Atlético Torino	Estadio Nacional, Lima
18:00	Mario Gutiérrez 26' 43'; César Adriazola 48'

21 December 1983	Sporting Cristal	4–1	Melgar	Estadio Nacional, Lima
20:00	Jorge Hirano 18' 88'; Héctor Chumpitaz 21' (pen.); Oswaldo Flores 35'		Genaro Neyra 50'	Attendance: 14,113; Referee: Edison Pérez

== See also ==
- 1983 Peruvian Segunda División
- 1983 Copa Perú
