= 1980 Torneo Descentralizado =

Torneo Descentralizado
- Season: 1980
- Dates: 11 April 1980– 8 February 1981
- Champions: Sporting Cristal; 5th Descentralizado title 7th Primera División title
- Runner up: Atlético Torino
- Relegated: Juventud La Palma
- Copa Libertadores: Sporting Cristal; Atlético Torino
- Top goalscorer: Oswaldo Ramírez (18 goals)

The 1980 Torneo Descentralizado was the sixty-fourth season of Peruvian football. A total of 16 teams competed in the tournament. The season was divided into two phases. Sporting Cristal won its seventh first division title and fifth national title.

== Format ==
The first stage of the tournament involves all sixteen teams playing against each other, once at home and once away. When this stage concluded, the top four teams advanced to an end-of-season playoff phase known as the Liguilla to determine the national champion. Relegation was determined by the bottom four teams of the first stage in a four-team group. The fourth-placed team was relegated and the third-placed team played a promotion/relegation playoff with the 1980 Copa Perú runner-up. The teams carried their first stage results into the Liguilla and relegation group except the sixteenth placed team which were docked 2 points for placing last.

== Teams ==
=== Team changes ===
Promoted from 1979 Copa Perú	Relegated from 1979 Primera División
▲ADT (1st)	▼ León de Huánuco (16th)

=== Stadia locations ===
Locations of the 1980 Primera División teams

Team	City	Stadium	Capacity	Field
Alfonso Ugarte	Puno	Enrique Torres Belón	20,000	Grass
Alianza Lima	La Victoria, Lima	Alejandro Villanueva	35,000	Grass
ADT	Tarma	Unión Tarma	9,000	Grass
Atlético Chalaco	Callao	Miguel Grau	15,000	Grass
Atlético Torino	Talara	Campeonísimo	8,000	Grass
CNI	Iquitos	Max Augustín	24,000	Grass
Coronel Bolognesi	Tacna	Jorge Basadre	19,850	Grass
Deportivo Junín	Huancayo	Huancayo	20,000	Grass
Deportivo Municipal	Cercado de Lima	Nacional	45,750	Grass
Juan Aurich	Chiclayo	Elías Aguirre	24,500	Grass
Juventud La Palma	Huacho	Segundo Aranda Torres	12,000	Grass
Melgar	Arequipa	Mariano Melgar	20,000	Grass
Sport Boys	Callao	Miguel Grau	15,000	Grass
Sporting Cristal	Rímac, Lima	Nacional	45,750	Grass
Unión Huaral	Huaral	Julio Lores Colan	10,000	Grass
Universitario	Breña, Lima	Nacional	45,750	Grass

== First Stage ==
=== Standings ===
Pos	Team	Pld	W	D	L	GF	GA	GD	Pts	Qualification
1	Sporting Cristal	30	16	9	5	47	24	+23	41	Liguilla Final
2	Atlético Torino	30	14	10	6	51	34	+17	38	Liguilla Final
3	Alfonso Ugarte	30	14	8	8	49	32	+17	36	Liguilla Final
4	ADT	30	13	10	7	40	31	+9	36	Liguilla Final
5	Alianza Lima	30	11	12	7	39	26	+13	34	
6	Deportivo Municipal	30	11	9	10	45	44	+1	31	
7	Deportivo Junín	30	11	8	11	34	37	−3	30	
8	Atlético Chalaco	30	8	13	9	35	35	0	29	
9	Universitario	30	6	16	8	42	41	+1	28	
10	Unión Huaral	30	9	10	11	32	39	−7	28	
11	Juan Aurich	30	8	12	10	28	35	−7	28	
12	CNI	30	7	12	11	33	49	−16	26	
13	Sport Boys	30	7	11	12	33	39	−6	25	Liguilla Descenso
14	Melgar	30	7	11	12	34	41	−7	25	Liguilla Descenso
15	Coronel Bolognesi	30	7	10	13	25	31	−6	24	Liguilla Descenso
16	Juventud La Palma	30	6	9	15	27	56	−29	21	Liguilla Descenso, Penalty -2

=== Results ===
Home \ Away	ADT	UGA	ALI	CHA	TOR	CNI	BOL	JUN	MUN	AUR	PAL	MEL	SBA	CRI	HUA	UNI
ADT		1–4	0–0	1–1	2–1	2–0	2–0	2–0	3–0	2–0	4–2	2–1	0–0	0–0	3–0	2–1
Alfonso Ugarte	0–0		1–1	1–2	2–0	3–0	4–1	4–0	3–3	4–0	2–0	2–0	1–1	2–1	1–0	2–0
Alianza Lima	1–0	2–2		1–0	1–1	5–0	0–0	1–1	3–3	0–1	3–0	3–1	3–2	0–1	1–2	2–2
Atlético Chalaco	2–2	2–4	0–0		1–0	0–1	0–0	0–0	2–0	2–1	2–0	2–0	2–2	1–2	0–0	4–2
Atlético Torino	1–0	2–0	0–1	2–1		6–0	1–0	4–0	3–3	1–1	2–0	3–1	2–0	0–0	2–1	4–1
CNI	1–1	1–1	1–0	0–0	4–0		1–1	1–0	4–2	4–1	2–2	1–1	1–1	1–3	2–1	1–1
Coronel Bolognesi	1–2	1–0	0–0	0–1	0–0	3–0		0–0	1–0	1–1	2–0	3–0	2–1	0–1	3–0	0–1
Deportivo Junín	1–0	1–0	1–0	2–1	0–1	1–1	3–1		1–0	4–3	4–0	0–0	2–3	1–0	4–2	0–0
Deportivo Municipal	3–0	1–0	2–0	1–1	3–3	2–1	1–0	3–2		4–2	2–2	2–1	1–0	0–2	1–3	1–1
Juan Aurich	2–1	2–1	0–1	0–0	0–0	1–1	1–0	3–2	0–0		1–1	0–1	0–0	0–0	0–1	1–1
Juventud La Palma	1–1	1–2	0–1	1–0	2–4	2–1	0–0	2–1	2–1	0–1		0–0	1–0	1–0	0–0	1–1
Melgar	1–2	1–1	0–4	4–2	0–0	2–1	1–1	1–1	1–0	1–0	7–2		4–0	2–2	1–1	0–0
Sport Boys	1–2	0–1	1–1	2–2	3–0	0–0	3–2	1–1	0–2	0–3	4–0	2–0		2–1	1–0	1–1
Sporting Cristal	1–1	5–0	1–0	2–2	0–0	2–2	3–0	1–0	2–1	0–1	5–4	2–1	1–0		3–0	2–2
Unión Huaral	2–2	1–1	2–3	3–1	3–3	1–0	1–1	2–0	0–2	1–1	0–0	1–0	1–0	0–1		1–1
Universitario	3–0	2–0	1–1	1–1	4–5	4–0	3–1	0–1	1–1	1–1	3–0	1–1	2–2	0–3	1–2	

Updated to match(es) played on 1980. Source: RSSSF Peru 1980
Legend: Blue = home team win; Yellow = draw; Red = away team win.

== Liguilla Final ==
=== Standings ===
Pos	Team	Pld	W	D	L	GF	GA	GD	Pts	Qualification	CRI	TOR	ADT	UGA
1	Sporting Cristal (C)	36	19	11	6	54	30	+24	49	1981 Copa Libertadores		1–0	1–0	2–1
2	Atlético Torino	36	17	10	9	57	40	+17	44	1981 Copa Libertadores	2–0		1–0	2–1
3	ADT	36	15	12	9	47	37	+10	42		1–1	2–0		3–3
4	Alfonso Ugarte	36	15	10	11	58	43	+15	40		2–2	2–1	0–1	

Source: https://www.rsssf.org/tablesp/peru80.html
Legend: Blue = home team win; Yellow = draw; Red = away team win.
(C) Champions

== Liguilla Descenso ==
=== Standings ===
Pos	Team	Pld	W	D	L	GF	GA	GD	Pts	Relegation	MEL	SBA	BOL	PAL
1	Melgar	36	10	14	12	45	45	0	34			2–0	1–0	4–0
2	Sport Boys	36	10	13	13	44	46	−2	33		1–1		3–1	2–0
3	Coronel Bolognesi (O)	36	8	13	15	33	40	−7	29	Promotion/relegation play-off	2–2	2–2		2–0
4	Juventud La Palma (R)	36	6	11	19	30	69	−39	21	1981 Copa Perú	1–1	1–3	1–1	

Source: https://www.rsssf.org/tablesp/peru80.html
Legend: Blue = home team win; Yellow = draw; Red = away team win.
(O) Play-off winners; (R) Relegated

== Promotion/relegation play-off ==
The Promotion/relegation play-off was contested between Coronel Bolognesi, who finished second-to-last in the 1980 Torneo Descentralizado, and Unión González Prada, runners-up of the 1980 Copa Perú. The Tacna-based side secured a convincing 5-0 aggregate victory, thereby retaining their place in the top division. Meanwhile, the Lima-based club missed out on what was arguably its best opportunity to earn promotion to the First Division.

1 February 1981	Unión González Prada	0–2	Coronel Bolognesi	Estadio Alejandro Villanueva, Lima
16:00			Américo Nieri 1'; Enrique Boné	Attendance: 6,075; Referee: Enrique Labo

8 February 1981	Coronel Bolognesi	3–0	Unión González Prada	Estadio Jorge Basadre, Tacna
15:30	Victorino Vicente 52'; Orlando Pérez 59' (o.g.); José Zevallos 74'

== See also ==
- 1980 Copa Perú
