= Estadio Campeonísimo =

Local stadium in Piura, Peru

Coordinates: 4.5777°S 81.2660°W

- El Campeonisimo
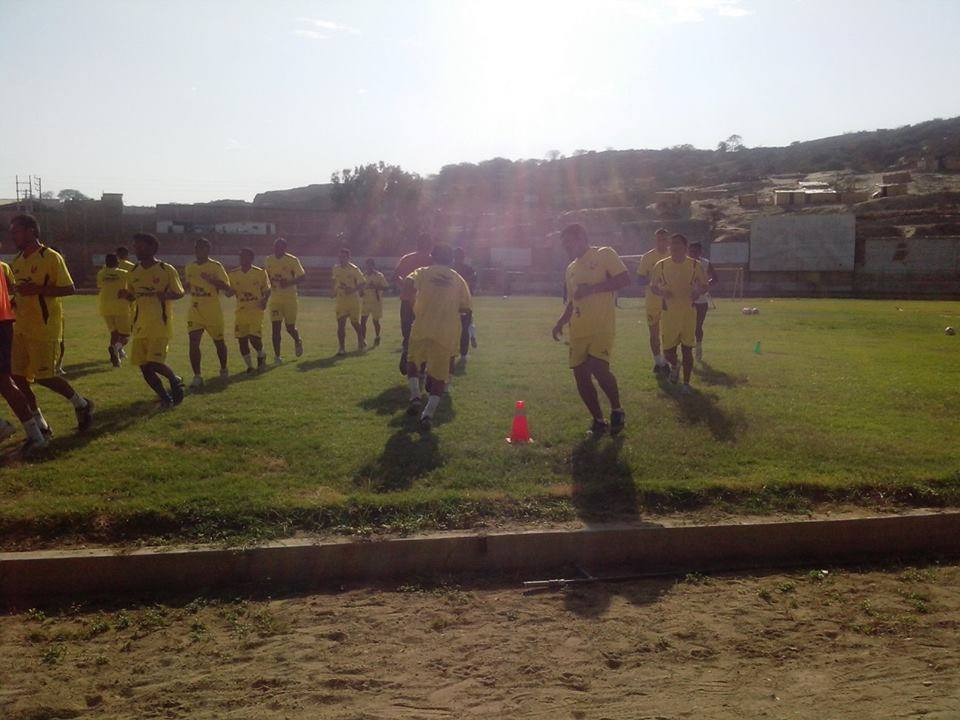
- Interactive map of Estadio Campeonísimo
- Location: (Peru) Talara, Piura
- Owner: Instituto Peruano del Deporte
- Capacity: 8000
- Surface: Synthetic grass

Construction
- Built: 1977
- Opened: 1977

Tenant
- Atlético Torino

Estadio Campeonísimo is a multi-use stadium in Piura, Peru. It is currently used by football team Atlético Torino. The stadium holds 8,000 people. The stadium also holds Copa Peru matches for some of the local teams in Talara.

It was built in 1977.
