= Unión González Prada =

Peruvian football club

- Nickname: Los gonzaleños
- Founded: 11 March 1948; 78 years ago
- Ground: Estadio Municipal de Surquillo, Lima
- Capacity: 2,000
Home colours	Away colours	Third colours

Unión González Prada is a Peruvian football club located in the district of Surquillo, Lima.

== History ==
Founded on 11 March 1948, Unión González Prada finished second in the Copa Perú in 1980 and played in a promotion playoff for the Peruvian First Division against Coronel Bolognesi, second-to-last in the 1980 championship. Defeated 2–0 and 3–0, the club missed the opportunity to play in the top flight.

Between 1983 and 1984, they won the Peruvian Second Division championship twice in a row but could not be promoted to the top tier because the Second Division did not offer promotion to the First Division in the early 1980s.

Playing in the Surquillo district league, Unión González Prada ceased all official competition in the 1990s and only played Masters football matches.

== Honours ==
=== Senior titles ===
Keys

- Record
- ^{(s)} Shared record

Type	Competition	Titles	Runner-up	Winning years	Runner-up years
National (League)	Segunda División	2	—	1983, 1984	—
National (League)	Copa Perú	—	1	—	1980
Regional (League)	Liga Mayor de Fútbol de Lima	2	—	1979, 1981	—

== Notable players ==
Pedro ‘Viroco’ Meza, César Sussoni, Gino Peña, Rigoberto Montoya, Luis Sone and Wálter Nájar formed part of the 2nd division champion team in 1983.

== See also ==
- List of football clubs in Peru
- Peruvian football league system
