= 1982 Copa Perú =

Copa Perú
- Season: 1982
- Champions: Atlético Torino
- Top goalscorer: García, Novoa, and Zambrano (3)

The 1982 Copa Perú season (Spanish: Copa Perú 1982), the promotion tournament of Peruvian football.

In this tournament, after many qualification rounds, each one of the 24 departments in which Peru is politically divided qualified a team. Those teams, plus the team relegated from First Division on the last year, enter in two more rounds and finally 6 of them qualify for the Final round, staged in Lima (the capital).

The champion was promoted to 1983 Torneo Descentralizado.

== Finalists teams ==
The following list shows the teams that qualified for the Final Stage.

Department	Team	Location
Callao	Academia Cantolao	Callao
Cusco	Deportivo Garcilaso	Cusco
Lima	Unión González Prada	Lima
Piura	Atlético Grau	Piura
Piura	Atlético Torino	Talara
Tacna	Defensor Tacna	Tacna

== Final Stage ==
=== Standings ===
Pos	Team	Pld	W	D	L	GF	GA	GD	Pts	Promotion
1	Atlético Torino (C)	5	2	2	1	6	3	+3	6	1983 Torneo Descentralizado
2	Atlético Grau	5	3	0	2	5	5	0	6	
3	Academia Cantolao	5	3	0	2	7	8	−1	6	
4	Unión González Prada	5	2	1	2	7	6	+1	5	
5	Defensor Tacna	5	2	1	2	4	3	+1	5	
6	Deportivo Garcilaso	5	0	2	3	4	8	−4	2	

(C) Champions

=== Results ===
==== Round 1 ====
31 October 1982	Academia Cantolao	1–0	Atlético Grau	Nacional, Lima

31 October 1982	Atlético Torino	2–2	Deportivo Garcilaso	Nacional, Lima

31 October 1982	Defensor Tacna	2–1	Unión González Prada	Nacional, Lima

==== Round 2 ====
3 November 1982	Atlético Grau	1–0	Atlético Torino	Nacional, Lima

3 November 1982	Unión González Prada	1–0	Deportivo Garcilaso	Nacional, Lima

3 November 1982	Defensor Tacna	2–0	Academia Cantolao	Nacional, Lima

==== Round 3 ====
7 November 1982	Atlético Torino	3–0	Academia Cantolao	Nacional, Lima

7 November 1982	Unión González Prada	3–1	Atlético Grau	Nacional, Lima

7 November 1982	Defensor Tacna	0–0	Deportivo Garcilaso	Nacional, Lima

==== Round 4 ====
10 November 1982	Atlético Grau	2–1	Deportivo Garcilaso	Nacional, Lima

10 November 1982	Academia Cantolao	3–2	Unión González Prada	Nacional, Lima

10 November 1982	Atlético Torino	1–0	Defensor Tacna	Nacional, Lima

==== Round 5 ====
14 November 1982	Academia Cantolao	3–1	Deportivo Garcilaso	Nacional, Lima

14 November 1982	Atlético Grau	1–0	Defensor Tacna	Nacional, Lima

14 November 1982	Atlético Torino	0–0	Unión González Prada	Nacional, Lima
