= Atlético Torino =

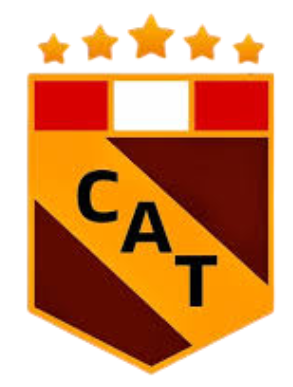
- Full name: Club Atlético Torino
- Nicknames: El Taladro Norteño (The Northern Drill)
- Founded: 1957
- Ground: Estadio Campeonísimo, Talara
- Capacity: 8,000
- Chairman: José Vitonera
- Manager: Pedro Sanjinez
- League: Copa Perú
- 2018: Quarterfinals
Home colours	Away colours

Club Atlético Torino is a Peruvian football club, playing in the city of Talara. The club were founded 1957 and play in the Copa Perú which is the fourth division of the Peruvian league. They are the record holders for the Copa Perú, with 5 titles.

== History ==
=== Foundation ===
Atlético Torino was founded on March 20, 1952, at Avenida H-44 in Talara by Cosme Maldonado Luna, his wife Adelaida Agurto, and a group of young football enthusiasts who sought to participate in the traditional inter-neighborhood tournaments of the time and establish a club that would represent them.

The club’s name was chosen through a vote among the founders, with the proposal made by Juan Arica emerging victorious. He suggested the name “Torino” as a tribute to Torino Football Club of Turin, Italy.

=== Amateur era ===
In 1952, the club registered in the Second Division of the Liga Distrital de Pariñas and achieved promotion to the top local division that same year. During its amateur era, it won league titles in 1963, 1965, 1968, and 1969. In the latter year, it played the final against Sport Blondell, defeating them 1–0 to claim the championship.

=== Promotion to the First Division ===
In mid-1970, Atlético Torino won the Copa Perú for the first time, finishing ahead of clubs such as FBC Melgar of Arequipa and CNI of Iquitos in the final standings. The Talara-based side secured the title with one match remaining in the final hexagonal stage after defeating Unión Ocopilla of Huancayo 2–1, with both goals scored by Luis “El Pollo” Ramírez.

During that campaign, César Vázquez Pinillos served as club president, while Paraguayan coach César Cubilla managed the team. That same year, Torino made its debut in the Peruvian First Division, finishing in 11th place among 14 participating teams. Its first relegation came in the 1973 Torneo Descentralizado.

Two years later, the “Taladro Norteño” won its second Copa Perú title. However, due to the enactment of Law 20555, there was no promotion to professional football that year, meaning the club’s return to the First Division had to wait until 1977. In that season, Torino captured its third Copa Perú after defeating Sportivo Huracán in a playoff match. The championship-winning squad, coached by Carlos Bustinza, regularly lined up with Ricardo Valladares; Felimer Rojas, Percy Maldonado, Humberto Sanjinés, Pedro Lolandez; José Novoa, Luis Vitorena, Raymundo Vargas; José Zapata, Francisco Montero Chunga, and Humberto Correa.

In the 1980 Torneo Descentralizado, Torino finished as national runner-up, earning qualification for the 1981 Copa Libertadores. The club was placed in a group alongside Sporting Cristal and Chilean clubs Cobreloa, the reigning Chilean champion, and Universidad de Chile, that country’s runner-up. During its international campaign, Torino suffered a heavy 6–1 defeat against Cobreloa in the city of Calama and was eliminated in the first round. That same year, the club was relegated.

Torino quickly returned to the top division in 1982 under the presidency of Edilberto Farfán after winning its fourth Copa Perú title in one of the tournament’s closest finishes. Torino, Academia Cantolao, and Atlético Grau all ended the final round-robin stage tied on six points, with goal difference ultimately awarding the title to the Talara club. The championship squad, managed by Moisés Barack, featured Ricardo Valladares; René Seminario, Carlos “Pay” Peña, Walter Valladares, Berna Dioses; Luis Vitorena, Freddy Peña, Humberto Correa; Guillermo Deza, Francisco Montero Chunga, and Félix Suárez. Torino remained in the top division until 1987, when it was relegated again after finishing near the bottom of the regional tournament standings.

The club’s last major achievement came in the 1994 Copa Perú. After eliminating FBC Aurora of Arequipa and José Gálvez FBC of Chimbote, Atlético Torino won its fifth Copa Perú title. The championship-winning team, coached by Diego Agurto, usually lined up with Juan Cardoza; Martín Vitteri, Carlos “Pay” Peña, Kenny Preciado, Eduardo Sanjinés; Julio Wancheng, Henry Pardo, Percy Peña, and Segundo Gonzales; Wilmer Abad, and Pedro Marchán.[9] Thanks to this triumph, the club returned once again to the First Division, where it remained until the 1997 Torneo Descentralizado, when it finished third from bottom and was relegated once more.

=== Relegation and Entry into the Second Division ===
In its return to the Regional Stage of the 1998 Copa Perú, Atlético Torino was eliminated early after losing 2–1 to IMI of Talara in the extra match corresponding to Group A.

In 2008, the club once again became the departmental champion of Piura after defeating its traditional rival, Atlético Grau, in the final. Torino continued advancing in the 2008 Copa Perú until reaching the final quadrangular stage, where it finished in third place, earning promotion to the 2009 Peruvian Segunda División.

During its most recent seasons in the promotion division, the club failed to establish strong campaigns and consistently battled against relegation. In addition, Torino suffered from a severe financial crisis that even resulted in point deductions in the league due to administrative issues. In 2013, Atlético Torino enjoyed a promising start in the Peruvian Segunda División; however, its performances declined as the season progressed, and the club ultimately had to settle for retaining its place in the division once again.

=== Return to Copa Perú ===
In the 2016 Peruvian Segunda División, Torino battled against relegation alongside Sport Boys and was relegated on the final matchday after losing 1–0 to Academia Cantolao. In the 2017 Copa Perú, the club began its campaign in the Liga Departamental de Piura; however, it was eliminated before facing Atlético Grau in the semifinals because its board of directors had not been registered in the Public Records Office.

For the 2018 Copa Perú, Torino won the departmental title and qualified for the National Stage. Its campaign ended in the quarterfinals, where it was eliminated by Alianza Universidad de Huánuco with an aggregate score of 3–2. The following year, the club did not participate in the tournament due to administrative issues prior to the start of the Departmental Stage.

The Talara-based side returned to competition in the 2022 Copa Perú, once again qualifying for the National Stage as departmental champion. However, it was eliminated in the first phase after finishing 36th in the overall standings with six points. In 2023, Torino won the district title but was disqualified before playing the provincial final due to outstanding debts.

In the 2025 Copa Perú, Torino returned to the National Stage after winning the departmental championship. During the tournament, the performances of goalkeeper and captain Nils Alania stood out, particularly in the Round of 32 and Round of 16 matches of the Northern Zone against Atlético Nacional de Yarinacocha and Bagua FC, respectively. However, the Talara side’s hopes of promotion came to an end in the quarterfinals after losing by a narrow margin in the second leg against Asociación Deportiva Tahuishco, conceding a dramatic goal in the 90th minute.

== Kit and badge ==
1957–79; Home	1980; Home	198? Home	198?–07; Home	2008–10; Home	2011; Home	2012–Present; Home

== Rivalries ==
Atlético Torino has had a long-standing rivalry with Atlético Grau and Alianza Atlético.

== Honours ==
=== Senior titles ===
Keys

- Record
- ^{(s)} Shared record

Type	Competition	Titles	Runner-up	Winning years	Runner-up years
National (League)	Primera División	—	1	—	1980
National (League)	Intermedia (1984–1987)	1	1	1986 Zona Norte	1985 Zona Norte
National (League)	Copa Perú	5	—	1970, 1975, 1977, 1982, 1994	—
Half-year / Short tournament (League)	Torneo Zona Norte	1	—	1984	—
Regional (League)	Región I	1	—	2008	—
Regional (League)	Liga Departamental de Piura	10	3	1969, 1974, 1976, 1987, 1994, 2008, 2018, 2022, 2025, 2026	1968, 2003, 2007
Regional (League)	Liga Provincial de Talara	8	2	1976, 2003, 2007, 2008, 2023, 2024, 2025, 2026	2018, 2022
Regional (League)	Liga Distrital de Pariñas	12	2	1963, 1965, 1968, 1969, 1974, 2003, 2007, 2022, 2023, 2024, 2025, 2026	2002, 2018

== Performance in CONMEBOL competitions ==
- Copa Libertadores: 1 appearance

1981: First Round

== Notable players ==
- (Peru) José Zapata (1978–81, 1983–87, 1990–91, 1995)

== See also ==
- List of football clubs in Peru
- Peruvian football league system
