= Enrique Bravo (footballer) =

Peruvian footballer (1955–2019)

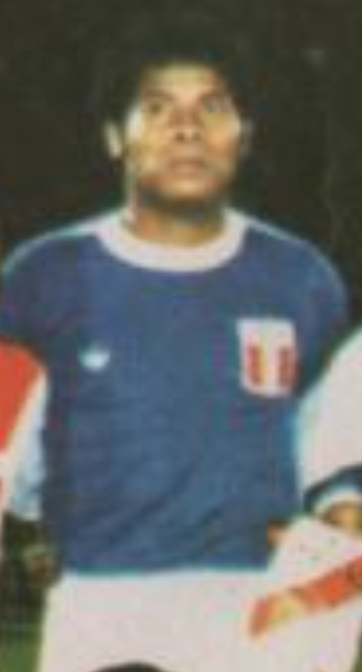
- Bravo in 1980

Personal information
- Full name: Enrique Bravo Cóndor
- Date of birth: 1955
- Place of birth: Huacho, Lima, Peru
- Date of death: 22 March 2019 (aged 63–64)
- Place of death: Los Angeles, California, U.S.
- Position: Goalkeeper

Senior career*
Years	Team	Apps	(Gls)
1978–1980	Juventud La Palma		
1981–1982	León de Huánuco		
1983–1987	Deportivo Municipal		

International career
1980–1984	Peru		(0)
- * Club domestic league appearances and goals

Enrique Bravo Cóndor (1955 – 22 March 2019) was a Peruvian footballer. Nicknamed "Chiquito", he was most well known for playing for Deportivo Municipal throughout the 1980s. He would also represent Peru internationally for the 1980 CONMEBOL Pre-Olympic Tournament as well as the 1983 Copa América.

== Club career ==
Bravo would begin his career by playing for Juventud La Palma where the club would become champions of the 1978 Copa Perú for promotion to the 1979 Torneo Descentralizado as he would become a club idol around this time. He earned his nickname "Chiquito" as a bait and switch for his actual grand stature. He would then play for Deportivo Municipal throughout the 1980s.

Throughout his career, he would play for various other clubs such as Pesca Perú de Mollendo, UTC de Cajamarca and Asociación Deportiva Tarma.

== International career ==
Bravo would first play for Peru during the 1980 CONMEBOL Pre-Olympic Tournament as he would play in the famous match on 27 January 1980 that would trash Brazil 3–0 as the club would narrowly miss qualification for the 1980 Summer Olympics as they would only lose to Colombia by goal difference. He would later make the Peru squad for the 1983 Copa América as a substitute goalkeeper for Eusebio Acasuzo. His final international appearances would be in a 1–4 loss against Argentinos Juniors in a friendly in 1984 in preparation for the 1986 FIFA World Cup qualifiers.

== Later life ==
Bravo would later briefly manage the Peruanito Foundation within the Whittier Narrows Recreation Area of Los Angeles with several players that had played for Sporting Cristal. He died on 22 March 2019 from illness.
