= List of Sporting Cristal seasons =

This is a list of seasons played by Sporting Cristal in Peruvian and South American football, from 1951 (the year of the club's first participated in the Peruvian Primera División) to the most recent completed season. Sporting Cristal was founded in December, 1951, in the Rímac district by engineer Ricardo Bentín Mujica and his wife Esther Grande de Bentín, owners of the Peruvian brewery Backus and Johnston.

The club has won the Peruvian Primera División twenty times, has finished as Copa Libertadores runner-up once, and has never been relegated from Peru's top division.

This list details the club's achievements in all major competitions, and the top scorers for each season (where the information is available). Top scorers in bold were also the top scorers in the Peruvian Primera División that season.

== Key ==
Key to colors and symbols

| 1st or W | Winners |
| 2nd or RU | Runners-up |
| 3rd | Third place |
| Pro. ↑ | Promoted ↑ |
| Rel. ↓ | Relegated ↓ |
| ♦ | League top scorer |

Key to league record

- Season = The year and article of the season
- League = League name
- Pld = Games played
- W = Games won
- L = Games lost
- D = Games drawn
- GF = Goals for
- GA = Goals against
- GD = Goal difference
- Pts = Points
- Pos = Regular season position
- Play-offs = Play-offs position

Key to national cups record

- — = Competition not held or canceled
- DNE = Did not enter
- DNQ = Did not qualify
- QR = Qualifying round
- PR = Preliminary round
- GS = Group stage
- R1 = First round
- R2 = Second round
- R3 = Third round
- R4 = Fourth round
- R5 = Fifth round
- Ro16 = Round of 16
- QF = Quarter-finals
- SF = Semi-finals
- F = Final
- RU = Runners-up
- W = Winners

== Seasons ==
=== Professional Era (1951-1965) ===
| Season | League | | | | | | | | | National Cups | | Continental / Other | | Tournament Top goalscorer(s) | |
| Season | Competition | Pos | Pld | W | D | L | GF | GA | Pts | National Cups | | Continental / Other | | Name(s) | Goals |
|---|---|---|---|---|---|---|---|---|---|---|---|---|---|---|---|
| 1956 | Primera División | **1st** | 18 | 13 | 3 | 2 | 43 | 19 | 29 | — | — | — | | — | — |
| 1957 | Primera División | 5th | 22 | 9 | 5 | 8 | 32 | 30 | 23 | — | — | — | | — | — |
| 1958 | Primera División | 8th | 22 | 9 | 3 | 10 | 35 | 26 | 21 | — | — | — | | — | — |
| 1959 | Primera División | 5th | 22 | 7 | 6 | 9 | 37 | 39 | 20 | — | — | — | | — | — |
| 1960 | Primera División | 3rd | 18 | 9 | 4 | 5 | 37 | 26 | 22 | — | — | DNQ | | — | — |
| 1961 | Primera División | **1st** (Note: Sporting Cristal defeated Alianza Lima by 2–0 after both teams tied on points at the end of the regular season.) | 18 | 12 | 2 | 4 | 34 | 21 | 26 | — | — | DNQ | | (Peru) **Alberto Gallardo** | 13 |
| 1962 | Primera División | 2nd | 18 | 12 | 3 | 3 | 47 | 18 | 27 | — | — | Copa Libertadores | GS | (Peru) **Alberto Gallardo** | 13 |
| 1963 | Primera División | 2nd | 18 | 11 | 6 | 1 | 49 | 15 | 28 | — | — | DNQ | | — | — |
| 1964 | Primera División | 5th | 22 | 10 | 5 | 7 | 32 | 25 | 25 | — | — | DNQ | | — | — |
| 1965 | Primera División | 6th | 22 | 10 | 5 | 7 | 41 | 31 | 25 | — | — | DNQ | | — | — |

=== National Championship Era (1966–present) ===
| Season | League | | | | | | | | Position | | National Cups | | Continental / Other | | Tournament Top goalscorer(s) | |
| Season | Competition | Pld | W | D | L | GF | GA | Pts | Pos | Play-offs (Note: Since 1966, play-off games have been used as a tie breaker between teams tie on points for promotion or relegation or as a post-season stage to decide the national championship. Whenever they have occurred, the club's position on that stage is shown in this column.) | National Cups | | Continental / Other | | Name(s) | Goals |
|---|---|---|---|---|---|---|---|---|---|---|---|---|---|---|---|---|
| 1966 | Torneo Descentralizado | 26 | 12 | 6 | 8 | 36 | 25 | 30 | 4th | — | — | — | DNQ | | — | — |
| 1967 | Torneo Descentralizado | 26 | 13 | 10 | 3 | 43 | 20 | 36 | 2nd | — | — | — | DNQ | | — | — |
| 1968 | Torneo Descentralizado | 26 | 15 | 7 | 4 | 35 | 15 | 37 | 1st | **1st** (Note: Sporting Cristal defeated Juan Aurich by 2–1 in the Championship play-off.) | — | — | Copa Libertadores | R2 | — | — |
| 1969 | Torneo Apertura | 13 | 7 | 1 | 5 | 19 | 16 | 15 | 4th | — | — | — | Copa Libertadores | GS | — | — |
| 1969 | Torneo Descentralizado | 20 | 7 | 7 | 6 | 28 | 22 | 21 | 9th | — | — | — | Copa Libertadores | GS | — | — |
| 1970 | Torneo Descentralizado | 32 | 18 | 9 | 5 | 58 | 32 | 71 | **1st** | — | Copa Presidente de la República | GS | DNQ | | — | — |
| 1971 | Torneo Descentralizado | 30 | 13 | 12 | 5 | 50 | 36 | 38 | 4th | — | — | — | Copa Libertadores | GS | — | — |
| 1972 | Metropolitan Group | 14 | 8 | 4 | 2 | 21 | 13 | 20 | 1st | — | — | — | DNQ | | — | — |
| 1972 | Torneo Descentralizado | 30 | 11 | 10 | 9 | 41 | 34 | 32 | 6th | — | — | — | DNQ | | — | — |
| 1972 | Final Group | 5 | 3 | 2 | 0 | 6 | 3 | 8 | **1st** | — | — | — | DNQ | | — | — |
| 1973 | Torneo Descentralizado | 39 | 20 | 10 | 9 | 55 | 33 | 50 | 2nd | — | — | — | Copa Libertadores | GS | — | — |
| 1974 | Torneo Descentralizado | 42 | 19 | 12 | 11 | 74 | 60 | 50 | 7th | — | — | — | Copa Libertadores | GS | — | — |
| 1975 | Torneo Descentralizado | 34 | 12 | 11 | 11 | 35 | 35 | 35 | 8th | — | — | — | DNQ | | — | — |
| 1976 | Torneo Descentralizado | 30 | 9 | 12 | 9 | 28 | 26 | 30 | 7th | — | — | — | DNQ | | — | — |
| 1977 | Torneo Interzonal | 16 | 7 | 4 | 5 | 29 | 24 | 18 | 4th | — | — | — | DNQ | | — | — |
| 1977 | Torneo Descentralizado | 40 | 19 | 11 | 10 | 74 | 40 | 49 | 2nd | — | — | — | DNQ | | — | — |
| 1978 | Preliminary Tournament | 14 | 2 | 2 | 10 | 14 | 32 | 6 | 8th | — | — | — | Copa Libertadores | GS | — | — |
| 1978 | Torneo Descentralizado | 30 | 18 | 6 | 6 | 61 | 28 | 42 | 3rd | — | — | — | Copa Libertadores | GS | — | — |
| 1979 | First Stage | 30 | 10 | 15 | 5 | 46 | 26 | 35 | 3rd | — | — | — | DNQ | | — | — |
| 1979 | Final Group | 14 | 9 | 4 | 1 | 26 | 8 | 23 (Note: Received a 1 point bonus for finishing third in the First Stage.) | **1st** | — | — | — | DNQ | | — | — |
| 1980 | Torneo Descentralizado | 36 | 19 | 11 | 6 | 54 | 30 | 49 | **1st** | — | — | — | Copa Libertadores | GS | (Peru) **Oswaldo Ramírez** | 18 |
| 1981 | Torneo Regional | 10 | 2 | 3 | 5 | 10 | 14 | 8 (Note: The points system was W:3, Won penalty shoot-out:2, L:0. The results of the reserve teams league were added as bonus points.) | 6th | — | — | — | Copa Libertadores | GS | — | — |
| 1981 | Torneo Descentralizado | 30 | 8 | 12 | 10 | 30 | 38 | 28 | 9th | — | — | — | Copa Libertadores | GS | — | — |
| 1982 | First Stage | 20 | 9 | 8 | 3 | 30 | 18 | 26 | 1st | — | — | — | DNQ | | — | — |
| 1982 | Second Stage | 8 | 2 | 1 | 5 | 10 | 11 | 5 | 4th (Note: Did not qualify to the final group.) | — | — | — | DNQ | | — | — |
| 1983 | First Stage | 32 | 14 | 13 | 5 | 59 | 31 | 41 | 2nd | — | — | — | DNQ | | (Peru) **Juan Caballero** | 29 |
| 1983 | Final Group | 5 | 5 | 0 | 0 | 13 | 4 | 12 (Note: Received a 2 point bonus for finishing second in the First Stage.) | **1st** | — | — | — | DNQ | | (Peru) **Juan Caballero** | 29 |
| 1984 | Regional tournament | 18 | 9 | 4 | 5 | 37 | 26 | 22 | 3rd | — | — | — | Copa Libertadores | GS | — | — |
| 1984 | Torneo Descentralizado | 26 | 8 | 12 | 6 | 35 | 24 | 28 | 4th | — | — | — | Copa Libertadores | GS | — | — |
| 1985 | Regional tournament | 22 | 6 | 9 | 7 | 26 | 25 | 21 | 6th | DNQ | — | — | DNQ | | — | — |
| 1985 | Torneo Descentralizado | 30 | 11 | 5 | 14 | 37 | 43 | 27 | 10th | DNQ | — | — | DNQ | | — | — |
| 1986 | Torneo Regional | 22 | 12 | 9 | 1 | 34 | 17 | 33 | 1st | QF | — | — | DNQ | | — | — |
| 1986 | Torneo Descentralizado | 10 | 5 | 3 | 2 | 13 | 6 | 13 | 1st | — | — | — | DNQ | | — | — |
| 1986 | Final Group Stage | 5 | 2 | 0 | 3 | 5 | 7 | 4 | 5th | — | — | — | DNQ | | — | — |
| 1987 | Regional tournament | 22 | 10 | 6 | 6 | 42 | 22 | 26 | 4th | — | — | — | DNQ | | — | — |
| 1987 | Torneo Descentralizado | 30 | 17 | 10 | 3 | 54 | 25 | 44 | 1st | — | — | — | DNQ | | — | — |
| 1987 | Final Group Stage | 5 | 2 | 0 | 3 | 5 | 5 | 6 | 4th | — | — | — | DNQ | | — | — |
| 1988 | Regional tournament | 12 | 4 | 5 | 3 | 16 | 13 | 13 | 3rd | DNQ | — | — | DNQ | | — | — |
| 1988 | Torneo Descentralizado | 22 | 11 | 6 | 5 | 28 | 15 | 28 | 1st | — | — | — | DNQ | | — | — |
| 1988 | Final Group Stage | 5 | 2 | 2 | 1 | 3 | 2 | 8 | 1st | **1st** (Note: Sporting Cristal defeated Universitario by 2–1 in the Championship play-off.) | — | — | DNQ | | — | — |
| 1989 | Regional I | 10 | 5 | 3 | 2 | 23 | 9 | 15 | 1st | — | Torneo Plácido Galindo | GS | Copa Libertadores | GS | — | — |
| 1989 | Regional I - Liguilla | 5 | 1 | 4 | 0 | 3 | 0 | 6 | 1st | W | Torneo Plácido Galindo | GS | Copa Libertadores | GS | — | — |
| 1989 | Regional II | 10 | 7 | 2 | 1 | 14 | 3 | 16 | 2nd (Note: Sporting Cristal lost the play-offs to the Liguilla Final to Aurora and Alianza Atlético.) | 2nd | Torneo Plácido Galindo | GS | Copa Libertadores | GS | — | — |
| 1990 | Regional I | 11 | 2 | 6 | 3 | 9 | 11 | 10 | 6th | DNQ | — | — | Copa Libertadores | GS | — | — |
| 1990 | Regional II | 22 | 8 | 5 | 9 | 26 | 23 | 21 | 7th | DNQ | — | — | Copa Libertadores | GS | — | — |
| 1991 | Regional I | 11 | 7 | 3 | 1 | 23 | 11 | 17 | 1st | W (Note: Sporting Cristal won a play-off match against Carlos A. Mannucci to reach the Liguilla Final.) | — | — | DNQ | | (Argentina) **Horacio Raúl Baldessari** | 25 |
| 1991 | Regional I - Liguilla Final | 3 | 1 | 2 | 0 | 2 | 1 | 4 | 2nd | 1st (Note: Sporting Cristal defeated Sport Boys by 1–0 in the Liguilla Final play-off after both tied on points in the Liguilla Final.) | — | — | DNQ | | (Argentina) **Horacio Raúl Baldessari** | 25 |
| 1991 | Regional II | 22 | 11 | 6 | 5 | 42 | 25 | 28 | 4th | W (Note: Sporting Cristal won a play-off match against Melgar to reach the Liguilla Final.) | — | — | DNQ | | (Argentina) **Horacio Raúl Baldessari** | 25 |
| 1991 | Regional II - Liguilla Final | 3 | 2 | 0 | 1 | 5 | 3 | 4 | 1st (Note: Sporting Cristal won the Regional II play-off to Universitario.) | **1st** (Note: Sporting Cristal won the national championship by finishing first in the Regional I and Regional II tournaments.) | — | — | DNQ | | (Argentina) **Horacio Raúl Baldessari** | 25 |
| 1992 | Torneo Descentralizado | 30 | 15 | 10 | 5 | 47 | 29 | 55 (Note: The league experimented with the three points for a win rule this year.) | 2nd | — | — | — | Copa Libertadores | Ro16 | — | — |
| 1992 | Continental Competition/Runner-up play-off | 30 | 19 | 5 | 6 | 53 | 23 | 62 | 2nd | — | — | — | Copa Libertadores | Ro16 | — | — |
| 1993 | Torneo Descentralizado | 30 | 16 | 5 | 9 | 68 | 33 | 37 | 5th | W (Note: Sporting Cristal defeated Deportivo Municipal to reach the Continental Competition/Runner-up play-off.) | Torneo Intermedio | QF | Copa Libertadores | QF | — | — |
| 1993 | Continental Competition/Runner-up play-off | 3 | 2 | 1 | 0 | 9 | 1 | 5 | 3rd | — | Torneo Intermedio | QF | Copa Libertadores | QF | — | — |
| 1994 | Torneo Apertura | 7 | 5 | 0 | 2 | 23 | 5 | 10 | 1st | 1st (Note: Sporting Cristal defeated Ciclista Lima by 4–1 in the Torneo Apertura final.) | — | — | Copa CONMEBOL | QF | (Peru) **Flavio Maestri** | 25 |
| 1994 | Torneo Descentralizado | 30 | 24 | 3 | 3 | 86 | 19 | 51 (Note: Received a 2 point bonus for finishing second in the Torneo Descentralizado.) | **1st** | | — | — | Copa CONMEBOL | QF | (Peru) **Flavio Maestri** | 25 |
| 1995 | Torneo Descentralizado | 44 | 29 | 9 | 6 | 98 | 32 | 96 (Note: The league permanently adopted the three points for a win rule this year.) | **1st** | — | — | — | Copa Libertadores | QF | (Peru) **Julinho** | 23 |
| 1996 | Torneo Descentralizado | 30 | 22 | 3 | 5 | 73 | 26 | 69 | **1st** | — | — | — | Copa Libertadores | Ro16 | — | — |
| 1997 | Torneo Apertura | 13 | 8 | 3 | 2 | 27 | 9 | 27 | 2nd | — | — | — | Copa Libertadores | RU | — | — |
| 1997 | Torneo Clausura | 13 | 6 | 4 | 3 | 25 | 16 | 22 | 3rd | — | — | — | Copa Libertadores | RU | — | — |
| 1997 | Continental Competition/Runner-up Play-off | 5 | 4 | 1 | 0 | 9 | 1 | 13 | 2nd | — | — | — | Copa Libertadores | RU | — | — |
| 1998 | Torneo Apertura | 22 | 10 | 7 | 5 | 40 | 20 | 37 | 3rd | 2nd (Note: Sporting Cristal lost to Universitario in the Championship play-offs.) | — | — | Copa Libertadores Copa Merconorte | GS GS | (Brazil) **Nílson Esidio** | 25 |
| 1998 | Torneo Clausura | 22 | 13 | 3 | 6 | 41 | 23 | 42 | 1st | 2nd | — | — | Copa Libertadores Copa Merconorte | GS GS | (Brazil) **Nílson Esidio** | 25 |
| 1999 | Torneo Apertura | 22 | 11 | 8 | 3 | 50 | 23 | 41 | 3rd | DNQ | — | — | Copa Libertadores Copa Merconorte | GS GS | — | — |
| 1999 | Torneo Clausura | 22 | 11 | 5 | 6 | 46 | 31 | 38 | 4th | | — | — | Copa Libertadores Copa Merconorte | GS GS | — | — |
| 2000 | Torneo Apertura | 22 | 7 | 7 | 8 | 40 | 31 | 28 | 8th | 2nd (Note: Sporting Cristal defeated Sport Boys 2–1 in the runner-up play-off.) | — | — | Copa Libertadores Copa Merconorte | GS GS | (Peru) Roberto Silva | 13 |
| 2000 | Torneo Clausura | 22 | 15 | 5 | 2 | 48 | 24 | 50 | 2nd | 2nd | — | — | Copa Libertadores Copa Merconorte | GS GS | (Peru) Roberto Silva | 13 |
| 2001 | Torneo Apertura | 22 | 13 | 7 | 2 | 46 | 18 | 46 | 1st | 2nd (Note: Sporting Cristal lost the Apertura tournament play-off final against Alianza Lima.) | — | — | Copa Libertadores Copa Merconorte | GS GS | (Argentina) Luis Alberto Bonnet (Peru) Jorge Soto | 18 |
| 2001 | Torneo Clausura | 22 | 14 | 2 | 6 | 44 | 25 | 44 | 3rd | W (Note: Sporting Cristal won a play-off match against Estudiantes de Medicina to qualify to the Copa Libertadores.) | — | — | Copa Libertadores Copa Merconorte | GS GS | (Argentina) Luis Alberto Bonnet (Peru) Jorge Soto | 18 |
| 2002 | Torneo Apertura | 22 | 11 | 5 | 6 | 43 | 23 | 38 | 1st | **1st** (Note: Sporting Cristal automatically won the Championship play-offs after Universitario did not qualify due to finishing below 8th place in the Clausura tournament.) | — | — | Copa Libertadores | GS | (Argentina) Luis Alberto Bonnet | 23 |
| 2002 | Torneo Clausura | 22 | 13 | 7 | 2 | 46 | 18 | 46 | 1st | **1st** | — | — | Copa Libertadores | GS | (Argentina) Luis Alberto Bonnet | 23 |
| 2003 | Torneo Apertura | 22 | 15 | 4 | 3 | 50 | 20 | 49 | 1st | 2nd (Note: Sporting Cristal lost the championship play-off to Alianza Lima by 2–1.) | — | — | Copa Libertadores | GS | (Argentina) **Luis Alberto Bonnet** | 20 |
| 2003 | Torneo Clausura | 15 (Note: A strike by the professional players cut the Clausura short. Most matches of Rounds 16 and 17 were played with under-20 and amateur players, but were later annulled.) | 7 | 6 | 2 | 29 | 18 | 27 | 3rd | 2nd | — | — | Copa Libertadores | GS | (Argentina) **Luis Alberto Bonnet** | 20 |
| 2004 | Torneo Apertura | 26 | 13 | 6 | 7 | 50 | 24 | 45 | 4th | 2nd (Note: Sporting Cristal lost the championship play-off to Alianza Lima by 5–4 in penalties after drawing 0–0.) | — | — | Copa Libertadores | Ro16 | (Argentina) Luis Alberto Bonnet | 28 |
| 2004 | Torneo Clausura | 26 | 16 | 2 | 8 | 55 | 37 | 50 | 1st | 2nd | — | — | Copa Libertadores | Ro16 | (Argentina) Luis Alberto Bonnet | 28 |
| 2005 | Torneo Apertura | 24 | 9 | 9 | 6 | 34 | 28 | 36 | 4th | **1st** (Note: Sporting Cristal defeated Cienciano by 0–1 in the Championship play-off.) | — | — | Copa Sudamericana | GS | — | — |
| 2005 | Torneo Clausura | 24 | 15 | 7 | 2 | 37 | 13 | 52 | 1st | **1st** | — | — | Copa Sudamericana | GS | — | — |
| 2006 | Torneo Apertura | 22 | 13 | 6 | 3 | 37 | 17 | 45 | 2nd | DNQ | — | — | Copa Libertadores | GS | (Argentina) Luis Alberto Bonnet | 12 |
| 2006 | Torneo Clausura | 22 | 9 | 4 | 9 | 24 | 15 | 31 | 6th | DNQ | — | — | Copa Libertadores | GS | (Argentina) Luis Alberto Bonnet | 12 |
| 2007 | Torneo Apertura | 22 | 6 | 2 | 14 | 25 | 35 | 20 | 10th | DNQ | — | — | Copa Libertadores | R1 | — | — |
| 2007 | Torneo Clausura | 22 | 7 | 9 | 6 | 21 | 23 | 30 | 6th | DNQ | — | — | Copa Libertadores | R1 | — | — |
| 2008 | Torneo Apertura | 26 | 15 | 4 | 7 | 46 | 32 | 49 | 2nd | 3rd (Note: Sporting Cristal finished 2nd on the tournament aggregate table but was champion of the Apertura or Clausura tournaments.) | — | — | DNQ | | (Uruguay) **Miguel Ximénez** | 32 |
| 2008 | Torneo Clausura | 26 | 14 | 3 | 9 | 36 | 25 | 45 | 2nd | 3rd | — | — | DNQ | | (Uruguay) **Miguel Ximénez** | 32 |
| 2009 | Torneo Descentralizado | 44 | 16 | 9 | 19 | 71 | 55 | 57 | 10th | DNQ | — | — | Copa Libertadores | R1 | (Colombia) Héctor Hurtado | 20 |
| 2010 | Torneo Descentralizado | 44 | 18 | 10 | 16 | 58 | 54 | 64 | 7th | DNQ | — | — | DNQ | | (Uruguay) Miguel Ximénez | 19 |
| 2011 | Torneo Descentralizado | 30 | 10 | 8 | 12 | 30 | 34 | 38 | 10th | DNQ | Torneo Intermedio | SF | DNQ | | — | — |
| 2012 | Torneo Descentralizado | 44 | 25 | 11 | 8 | 93 | 44 | 86 | 1st | **1st** (Note: Sporting Cristal defeated Real Garcilaso in the Championship play-offs.) | — | — | DNQ | | (Peru) Junior Ross | 17 |
| 2013 | Torneo Descentralizado | 44 | 22 | 9 | 13 | 76 | 45 | 75 | 3rd (Note: Sporting Cristal finished third in the aggregate table.) | DNQ | — | — | Copa Libertadores | GS | (Peru) Irven Ávila | 18 |
| 2014 | Torneo Apertura | 15 | 4 | 5 | 6 | 26 | 19 | 17 | 13th | **1st** | Torneo del Inca | GS | Copa Libertadores | R1 | (Peru) Irven Ávila | 20 |
| 2014 | Torneo Clausura | 15 | 10 | 3 | 2 | 35 | 19 | 13 | 1st (Note: Sporting Cristal defeated Alianza Lima in a play-off match for the Clausura championship after both finished tied on points.) | **1st** | Torneo del Inca | GS | Copa Libertadores | R1 | (Peru) Irven Ávila | 20 |
| 2015 | Torneo Apertura | 16 | 9 | 4 | 3 | 25 | 16 | 31 | 1st | 2nd | Torneo del Inca | GS | Copa Libertadores | GS | (Peru) Carlos Lobatón | 13 |
| 2015 | Torneo Clausura | 16 | 7 | 6 | 3 | 35 | 24 | 27 | 5th | 2nd | Torneo del Inca | GS | Copa Libertadores | GS | (Peru) Carlos Lobatón | 13 |
| 2016 | Torneo Descentralizado | 44 | 21 | 12 | 11 | 70 | 48 | 77 (Note: Sporting Cristal were awarded 2 point for 2016 Torneo de Promoción y Reserva success.) | 1st | **1st** | — | — | Copa Libertadores | GS | — | — |
| 2017 | Torneo de Verano | 14 | 6 | 4 | 4 | 27 | 16 | 22 | 3rd | DNQ | — | — | Copa Libertadores | GS | (Peru) **Irven Ávila** | 22 |
| 2017 | Torneo Apertura | 15 | 6 | 5 | 4 | 22 | 20 | 23 | 7th | DNQ | — | — | Copa Libertadores | GS | (Peru) **Irven Ávila** | 22 |
| 2017 | Torneo Clausura | 15 | 5 | 3 | 7 | 27 | 24 | 19 (Note: Sporting Cristal were awarded 1 point for 2017 Torneo de Promoción y Reserva success.) | 9th | DNQ | — | — | Copa Libertadores | GS | (Peru) **Irven Ávila** | 22 |
| 2018 | Torneo de Verano | 14 | 10 | 3 | 1 | 42 | 15 | 33 | 1st | 1st (Note: Sporting Cristal defeated Sport Huancayo in the Torneo de Verano finals.) | DNQ | — | Copa Sudamericana | R1 | (Argentina) **Emanuel Herrera** | 40 |
| 2018 | Torneo Apertura | 15 | 9 | 5 | 1 | 27 | 7 | 32 | 1st | **1st** | DNQ | — | Copa Sudamericana | R1 | (Argentina) **Emanuel Herrera** | 40 |
| 2018 | Torneo Clausura | 15 | 7 | 3 | 5 | 37 | 14 | 24 | 5th | **1st** | DNQ | — | Copa Sudamericana | R1 | (Argentina) **Emanuel Herrera** | 40 |
| 2019 | Torneo Apertura | 17 | 9 | 5 | 3 | 28 | 13 | 32 | 2nd | 3rd | Copa Bicentenario | QF | Copa Libertadores Copa Sudamericana | GS Ro16 | (Uruguay) Cristian Palacios | 13 |
| 2019 | Torneo Clausura | 17 | 9 | 4 | 4 | 31 | 20 | 31 | 3rd | 3rd | Copa Bicentenario | QF | Copa Libertadores Copa Sudamericana | GS Ro16 | (Uruguay) Cristian Palacios | 13 |
| 2020 | Torneo Apertura | 19 | 9 | 6 | 4 | 38 | 23 | 33 | 3rd | **1st** (Note: Sporting Cristal defeated Universitario in the play-off finals.) | Copa Bicentenario | — (Note: The Copa Bicentenario was canceled due to the COVID-19 pandemic.) | Copa Libertadores | R2 | (Argentina) **Emanuel Herrera** | 20 |
| 2020 | Torneo Clausura | 9 | 7 | 2 | 0 | 20 | 9 | 23 | 2nd (Note: Sporting Cristal lost the Clausura playoff to Ayacucho.) | **1st** | Copa Bicentenario | — | Copa Libertadores | R2 | (Argentina) **Emanuel Herrera** | 20 |
| 2021 | Torneo Apertura | 9 | 8 | 0 | 1 | 18 | 6 | 24 | 1st (Note: Sporting Cristal beat Universidad San Martín in the Aperatura playoff.) | 2nd (Note: Sporting Cristal lost to Alianza Lima in the play-off finals.) | Copa Bicentenario | **1st** | Copa Libertadores Copa Sudamericana | GS QF | (Peru) Alejandro Hohberg | 10 |
| 2021 | Torneo Clausura | 17 | 10 | 4 | 3 | 39 | 23 | 34 | 2nd | 2nd | Copa Bicentenario | **1st** | Copa Libertadores Copa Sudamericana | GS QF | (Peru) Alejandro Hohberg | 10 |
| 2022 | Torneo Apertura | 18 | 11 | 5 | 2 | 35 | 20 | 38 | 3rd | 3rd (Note: Sporting Cristal lost to Melgar in the play-off semi-finals.) | — | — | Copa Libertadores | GS | (Peru) Alejandro Hohberg | 11 |
| 2022 | Torneo Clausura | 18 | 12 | 5 | 1 | 39 | 17 | 41 | 2nd | 3rd | — | — | Copa Libertadores | GS | (Peru) Alejandro Hohberg | 11 |
| 2023 | Torneo Apertura | 18 | 9 | 8 | 1 | 33 | 18 | 35 | 2nd | DNQ | — | — | Copa Libertadores Copa Sudamericana | GS KO | (Brazil) Brenner Marlos | 14 |
| 2023 | Torneo Clausura | 18 | 10 | 6 | 2 | 31 | 13 | 36 | 4th | DNQ | — | — | Copa Libertadores Copa Sudamericana | GS KO | (Brazil) Brenner Marlos | 14 |
| 2024 | Torneo Apertura | 17 | 13 | 1 | 3 | 44 | 20 | 40 | 2nd | DNQ | — | — | Copa Libertadores | R2 | (Uruguay) **Martín Cauteruccio** | 35 |
| 2024 | Torneo Clausura | 17 | 10 | 4 | 3 | 47 | 15 | 34 | 3rd | DNQ | — | — | Copa Libertadores | R2 | (Uruguay) **Martín Cauteruccio** | 35 |
| 2025 | Torneo Apertura | 18 | 10 | 2 | 6 | 31 | 24 | 32 | 5th | DNQ | — | — | Copa Libertadores | GS | | |
| 2025 | Torneo Clausura | 17 | 9 | 4 | 4 | 29 | 13 | 31 | 3rd | DNQ | — | — | Copa Libertadores | GS | | |
