= 1947 in association football =

The following are the football (soccer) events of the year 1947 throughout the world.

== Winners club national championship ==
=== Argentina ===
- River Plate

=== Austria ===
- SC Wacker Wien

=== Chile ===
- Colo-Colo

=== Costa Rica ===
- C.S. Herediano

=== England ===
for fuller coverage see 1946–47 in English football

- First Division: Liverpool
- Second Division: Manchester City
- Third Division: Doncaster Rovers
- Fourth Division: Cardiff City
- FA Cup: Charlton Athletic

=== France ===
- CO Roubaix-Tourcoing

=== Hungary ===
- Újpest FC

=== Italy ===
- Torino

=== Ireland ===
- Shelbourne

=== Mexico ===
- Atlante

=== Netherlands ===
- Ajax Amsterdam

=== Paraguay ===
- Olimpia Asunción

=== Romania ===
- Divizia A: ITA Arad
- Divizia B: Unirea Tricolor București, Ploiești, Dermata Cluj
- Divizia C: Concordia Ploiești, BNR București, Astra Română Câmpina, PCA Constanța, Ripensia Timișoara, Sanitas Satu Mare, CFR Cluj, Șoimii Sibiu, Doljul Craiova, Aninoasa, Danubiana Roman, Astra Română Moreni

=== Scotland ===
for fuller coverage see 1946–47 in Scottish football

- League Division A: Rangers
- League Division B: Dundee
- League Division C: Stirling Albion
- Scottish Cup: Aberdeen
- Scottish League Cup: Rangers

=== Spain ===
- Valencia

=== Sweden ===
- IFK Norrköping

=== Switzerland ===
- FC Biel-Bienne

=== Turkey ===
- Ankara Demirspor

=== Uruguay ===
- Nacional

=== USSR ===
- First Group: CDKA Moscow
- Second Group: Lokomotiv Moscow
- Soviet Cup: Spartak Moscow

=== Yugoslavia ===
- Partizan Beograd

== International tournaments ==
- 1947 British Home Championship (28 September 1946 – 12 April 1947)

England

== Births ==
- 15 January – Peter Nogly, German international Footballer
- 25 January – Tostão, Brazilian international footballer
- 20 February – Peter Osgood, English international footballer (died 2006)
- 24 February – Fernando Barrachina, Spanish international footballer (died 2016)
- 3 March – Óscar Tabárez, Uruguayan football player and manager
- 24 March – Archie Gemmill, Scottish international footballer
- 30 March – Henry Perales, Peruvian footballer (died 2021)
- 3 April – Ladislav Kuna, Slovak football player and manager (died 2012)
- 24 April – Aldo Anzuini, Italian retired football player and coach
- 25 April – Johan Cruijff, Dutch international footballer and manager (died 2016)
- 8 May – Sef Vergoossen, Dutch football manager
- 19 June – Alan Woodward, English former professional footballer
- 3 July – Rob Rensenbrink, Dutch international footballer (died 2020)
- 10 August – Laurent Pokou, Ivorian international footballer (died 2016)
- 28 August – Emlyn Hughes, English international footballer (died 2004)
- 15 October – Laszlo Fazekas, Hungarian international footballer
- 16 October – Ken Woodward, English former professional footballer
- 23 October – Kazimierz Deyna, Polish international footballer (died 1989)
- 2 November – Allan Michaelsen, Danish international footballer (died 2016)
- 26 December – Dominique Baratelli, French international footballer

== Deaths ==
- 8 May – Attilio Ferraris, Italian midfielder, winner of the 1934 FIFA World Cup. (43, heart attack during a friendly match between former stars in Montecatini Terme)
- 12 June – Cosme Damião, Portuguese football player and manager, 61
