= Enrique Bravo =

Enrique Bravo may refer to:

- Enrique Bravo (footballer) (1955–2019), Peruvian footballer
- Enrique Bravo Hildebrandt, Chilean television director, 100 días para enamorarse (Chilean TV series) et al.
- Enrique Bravo López (born 1955), Cuban gymnast
- Enrique Bravo Ortiz (1878–1966), Chilean Army officer and politician
- Enrique Bravo Valencia, Mexican politician, municipal president of Morelia
