= Copa Perú =

Football tournament in Peru

- Founded: 1967; 59 years ago
- First season: 1967
- Country: Perú
- Number of clubs: 50
- Level on pyramid: 4
- Promotion to: Liga 3
- Relegation to: Ligas Departamentales
- Current champions: Unión Minas (1st title) (2025)
- Most championships: Atlético Torino (5 titles)
- Broadcaster(s): DirecTV
- Current: 2026 Copa Perú

The Copa Perú is a football tournament in Peru and the fourth-highest division of the Peruvian football league system. Despite its name, it is not entirely an elimination-cup competition involving all Peruvian clubs, but rather a series of league tournaments leading to an elimination tournament, with regional league clubs as participants. It guarantees its 4 teams promotion to the Liga 3.

== Background ==
In 1965, with football activity practically paralyzed among the Lima teams because the Peru national football team was playing in the 1966 FIFA World Cup qualification, four provincial teams agreed under the auspices of Orlando Balarezo, president of Atlético Grau, to organize the Cuadrangular de Campeones Provincianos, a football tournament in Lima among the provincial champions.

== History ==
The Copa Perú trophy.

In 1966, the First Division was named Descentralizado; teams from outside the capital of Lima were allowed to participate in the professional first division. The following year, the Copa Perú began, in which all non-professional teams in Peru were allowed to compete, with the winner to gain promotion to the First Division. After playing many elimination rounds, once six teams were left in the competition, they played in a final round-robin tournament in Lima.

In 1974, the tournament ended at the Regional Stage and no Final took place. The departmental champions qualified for the 1974 Reclasificatorio Regional with the last teams from the 1973 Torneo Descentralizado that had to revalidate the category. At the end of the 1974 Reclasificatorio Regional, the teams Alfonso Ugarte, Barrio Frigorífico, Carlos A. Mannucci, Deportivo Junín, Piérola, Unión Huaral, Unión Pesquero and Walter Ormeño were promoted to the 1974 Torneo Descentralizado.

In 1984, the First Division grew from 16 to 44 teams: after the first stage of the season, a Regional Championship qualified the teams for the Decentralizado, with 16 to 18 teams. The Copa Perú qualified teams for the Regional competition. Following this the tournament declined; 1987 was the last year in which a final was contested. The competitions was suspended as a result of the lack of interest and general economic crisis going on during President Alan García's first term. In 1992 the First Division returned to its normal format (16 teams). In 1993 the Copa Perú was returned as a competition for the Second Division, but only for teams outside of Lima. Since 1993, there has also been a Second Division for teams competing that are based in Lima.

In 1998, a major change took place: eight teams from the regional stage qualified for the Finals stage. This was played as a traditional cup tournament with home and away legs being played. The winner gains promotion to the First Division. In 2004, the tournament widened to 16 teams, so that teams from Lima could also compete. The winner and runner-up of the Second Division played in the Round of 16 of the Copa Peru. However, in 2006 this format was abolished as now the winner of the Second Division is promoted to the First Division. In 2008, the National Stage was modified. The four teams that qualified for the semi-finals played in a final group stage; the top two were promoted to the First Division.

In 2009, the Peruvian Football Federation officialized the creation of the Ligas Superiores del Peru. The Ligas Superiores will group to a select group of clubs of each department, that will be faced only among itself and will throw a champion and a runner-up that will agree directly, for now, to play a home run against the clubs that remain first and second in the Departmental Stage. For 2009, nine Departmental Confederacies had adopted them: Arequipa, Ayacucho, Cajamarca, Huánuco, Lambayeque, Pasco, Piura, Puno and Tumbes.

On August 23, 2022, it was announced that from 2023, the Copa Perú would only give promotion to Liga 2 due to the reforms of Peruvian football by the FPF. In 2025, the Copa Perú was moved to the fourth tier, being replaced by the Liga 3.

== Format ==
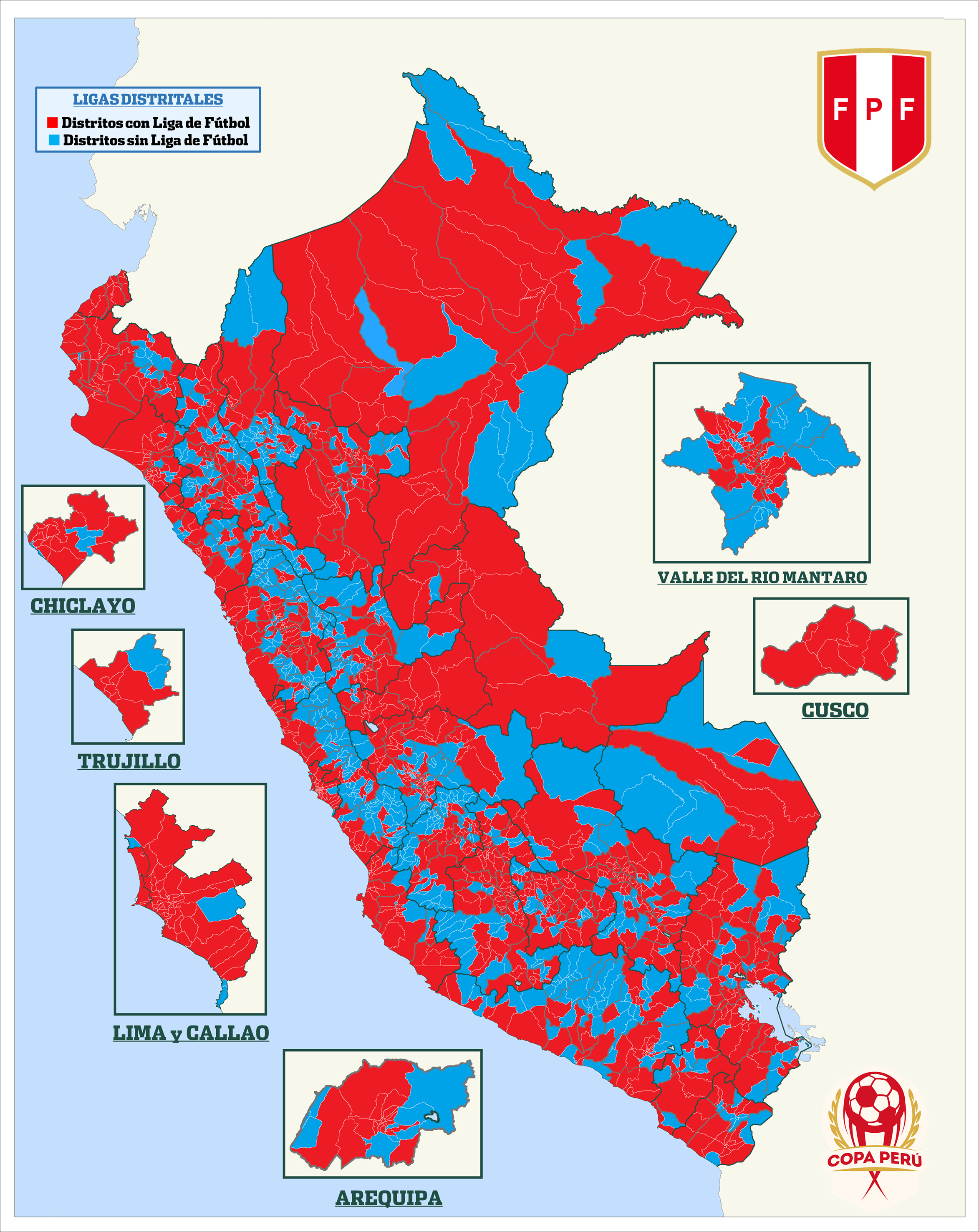
Districts with a district league in the tournament.

The tournament has 5 stages. The first stage of the tournament is the District Stage (Spanish: Etapa Distrital), played from February to May. Districts hold a small league tournament to determine its winners which will qualify for the next stage. The second stage is the Provincial Stage (Spanish: Etapa Provincial), played in June and July. The District winners play in groups and the winners qualify for the next stage. The third stage is the Departmental Stage (Spanish: Etapa Departamental), consisting of another league tournament, between July and September.

Starting in 2015 under the leadership of the new Peruvian Football Federation president Edwin Oviedo, all the Regions of Peru are represented in the National Stage, which is played under Regional using the POT System, intellectual property of MatchVision company. The new National Stage starts in the first week of September.

This new phase features the 50 teams that qualified from the Departmental Stage. Each team plays 3 games at home and 3 games away, for a total of 6 games against 3 different geographical rivals. The departmental stage winners only play against departmental runners-up, and vice versa. All the teams are positioned in one general table. After 6 matches, the team in places 1 to 8 are qualified directly to the Round of 16, while the teams in places 9 to 24 will play the Repechage phase. The teams in places 25 to 50 are eliminated.

The teams play a bracket tournament up to the Semi-finals. All four teams qualified to the semi-finals play a final group stage known as La Finalísima in Lima. The winner of the final group stage and the runner-up of the final group stage will be promoted to the Liga 2.

=== Stages ===
Level	Stage
4	Etapa Nacional
5	Ligas Departamentales
6	Ligas Provinciales
7	Ligas Distritales Primera División
8	Ligas Distritales Segunda División

== Division levels ==
Year	Level	Promotion to	Relegation to
1967–1973	2	Primera División	Etapa Regional (1967–2014) Ligas Departamentales Ligas Provinciales Ligas Distritales
1974	3	Reclasificatorio Regional	Etapa Regional (1967–2014) Ligas Departamentales Ligas Provinciales Ligas Distritales
1975–1990	3	Primera División	Etapa Regional (1967–2014) Ligas Departamentales Ligas Provinciales Ligas Distritales
1991	3	Torneo Zonal	Etapa Regional (1967–2014) Ligas Departamentales Ligas Provinciales Ligas Distritales
1992–2022	2	Primera División (Champion) Segunda División (Runner-up)	Etapa Regional (1967–2014) Ligas Departamentales Ligas Provinciales Ligas Distritales
2023–2024	3	Liga 2	Etapa Regional (1967–2014) Ligas Departamentales Ligas Provinciales Ligas Distritales
2025	4	Liga 2 (Champion); Liga 3 (Best teams)	Etapa Regional (1967–2014) Ligas Departamentales Ligas Provinciales Ligas Distritales

== Champions ==
Note: For the coaches who won the Copa Perú, see: RSSSF

- (In bracket, title count):

Ed.	Season	Champion	Runner-up	Winning manager
1	1967	Alfonso Ugarte de Chiclín (1)	Octavio Espinosa	(Argentina) Ángel Fernández Roca
2	1968	Carlos A. Mannucci (1)	Sport Chorrillos	(Peru) Juan Honores
3	1969	Carlos A. Mannucci (2)	Melgar	(Paraguay) Miguel Ortega
4	1970	Atlético Torino (1)	Melgar	(Paraguay) César Cubilla
5	1971	Melgar (1)	Unión Tumán	(Peru) Walter Milera
6	1972	Atlético Grau (1)	León de Huánuco	(Peru) Guillermo Quineche
7	1973	Sportivo Huracán (1)	Cienciano	(Peru) Carlos Puertas
–	1974	No champion crowned. It was only played until the Departamental Stage.^{[A]} (See: 1974 Reclasificatorio Regional)		
8	1975	Atlético Torino (2)	Sportivo Huracán	(Peru) Carlos Bustinza
9	1976	Coronel Bolognesi (1)	Pesca Perú	(Peru) Luis Roth
10	1977	Atlético Torino (3)	Juventud La Palma	(Peru) Carlos Bustinza
11	1978	Juventud La Palma (1)	Pesca Perú	(Peru) Mario Gonzales Benites
12	1979	ADT (1)	Comercial Aguas Verdes	(Peru) José Chacaltana
13	1980	León de Huánuco (1)	Unión González Prada	(Peru) Julio Gómez
14	1981	UTC (1)	Juventud La Palma	(Peru) José Salas Jáuregui
15	1982	Atlético Torino (4)	Atlético Grau	(Peru) Moisés Barack
16	1983	Sport Pilsen (1)	Deportivo Cañaña	(Peru) Felipe Díaz Cumpen
17	1984	Los Espartanos (1)	Alianza Atlético	(Argentina) Vito Andrés Bártoli
18	1985	Hungaritos Agustinos (1)	Tejidos La Unión	(Peru) Henry Perales
19	1986	Deportivo Cañaña (1)	Félix Donayre	(Peru) Eduardo Rodríguez
20	1987	Libertad (1)	Capitán Clavero	(Uruguay) Mario Catalá
–	1988–1992	No champions crowned. It was only played until the Regional Stage.^{[B]} (See: 1992 Torneo Zonal)		
21	1993	Aurich–Cañaña (1)	Aurora	(Argentina) Horacio Baldessari
22	1994	Atlético Torino (5)	Aurora	(Peru) Diego Agurto
23	1995	La Loretana (1)	Sportivo Huracán	(Peru) Henry Perales
24	1996	José Gálvez (1)	UTC	(Peru) Moisés Barack
25	1997	Juan Aurich (1)	Deportivo UPAO	(Peru) Luis Sanjinez Castillo
26	1998	I.M.I. (1)	Coronel Bolognesi	(Peru) Diego Agurto
27	1999	Deportivo UPAO (1)	Alfonso Ugarte	(Peru) José Ramírez Cubas
28	2000	Estudiantes de Medicina (1)	Coronel Bolognesi	(Peru) José Ramírez Cubas
29	2001	Sport Bolito (2)	Universidad Cesar Vallejo	(Peru) Ítalo Herrera Calderón
30	2002	Atlético Universidad (1)	Atlético Grau	(Peru) Elmer Lozada
31	2003	Universidad Cesar Vallejo (1)	Deportivo Educación	(Peru) Andrés Esquerre
32	2004	Sport Áncash (1)	Deportivo Municipal	(Peru) Tito Chumpitaz
33	2005	José Gálvez (2)	Senati	(Peru) José Ramírez Cubas
34	2006	Total Clean (1)	Hijos de Acosvinchos	(Peru) Roberto Arrelucea
35	2007	Juan Aurich (2)	Sport Águila	(Argentina) Horacio Baldessari
36	2008	Sport Huancayo (1)	CNI	(Peru) José Ramírez Cubas
37	2009	León de Huánuco (2)	Tecnólogico	(Peru) Oswaldo Araujo (Peru) Miguel Seminario
38	2010	Unión Comercio (1)	Alianza Unicachi	(Peru) Leonardo Morales
39	2011	Real Garcilaso (1)	Pacífico	(Peru) Freddy García
40	2012	UTC (2)	Alfonso Ugarte	(Peru) Rafael Castillo
41	2013	San Simón (1)	Unión Huaral	(Peru) Luis Flores
42	2014	Sport Loreto (1)	Unión Fuerza Minera	(Peru) José Ramírez Cubas
43	2015	Defensor La Bocana (1)	Academia Cantolao	(Peru) Javier Atoche
44	2016	Sport Rosario (1)	Deportivo Hualgayoc	(Peru) Lizandro Barbarán
45	2017	Binacional (1)	Atlético Grau	(Peru) Luis Flores
46	2018	Pirata (1)	Alianza Universidad	(Peru) Juan Carlos Bazalar
47	2019	Carlos Stein (1)	Deportivo Llacuabamba	(Peru) Juan Carlos Bazalar
–	2020	No completed due to the COVID-19 pandemic.		
48	2021	ADT (2)	Alfonso Ugarte	(Peru) Juan Carlos Bazalar
49	2022	Deportivo Garcilaso (1)	Comerciantes	(Peru) Roberto Tristán
50	2023	ADA (1)	San Marcos	(Peru) Roberto Arrelucea
51	2024	Bentín Tacna Heroica (1)	Cajamarca	(Peru) Jesús Álvarez
52	2025	Unión Minas (1)	ANBA Perú	(Peru) Jesús Álvarez
53	2026			

=== Footnotes ===
A. In this year the tournament ended at the Departamental Stage and no Final took place. The departamental champions qualified for the 1974 Reclasificatorio Regional with the last teams from the 1973 Torneo Descentralizado that had to revalidate the category. At the end of the 1974 Reclasificatorio Regional, the teams Alfonso Ugarte, Barrio Frigorífico, Carlos A. Mannucci, Deportivo Junín, Piérola, Unión Huaral, Unión Pesquero and Walter Ormeño were promoted to the 1974 Torneo Descentralizado.
B. From 1988 to 1992, no Final tournaments were held. Regional champions entered the Peruvian Primera División’s Regional tournaments.

== Titles by club ==
Rank	Club	Titles	Runners-up	Seasons won	Seasons runner-up
1	Atlético Torino	5	—	1970, 1975, 1977, 1982, 1994	—
2	Coronel Bolognesi	2	2	1976, 2001	1998, 2000
2	León de Huánuco	2	1	1980, 2009	1972
2	UTC	2	1	1981, 2012	1996
2	ADT	2	—	1979, 2021	—
2	Carlos A. Mannucci	2	—	1968, 1969	—
2	José Gálvez	2	—	1996, 2005	—
2	Juan Aurich	2	—	1997, 2007	—
3	Atlético Grau	1	3	1972	1982, 2002, 2017
3	Juventud La Palma	1	2	1978	1977, 1981
3	Melgar	1	2	1971	1969, 1970
3	Sportivo Huracán	1	2	1973	1975, 1995
3	Deportivo Cañaña	1	1	1986	1983
3	Universidad César Vallejo	1	1	2003	2001
3	Deportivo UPAO	1	1	1999	1997
3	ADA	1	—	2023	—
3	Alfonso Ugarte de Chiclín	1	—	1967	—
3	Atlético Universidad	1	—	2002	—
3	Aurich–Cañaña	1	—	1993	—
3	Bentín Tacna Heroica	1	—	2024	—
3	Binacional	1	—	2017	—
3	Carlos Stein	1	—	2019	—
3	Defensor La Bocana	1	—	2015	—
3	Deportivo Garcilaso	1	—	2022	—
3	Estudiantes de Medicina	1	—	2000	—
3	Hungaritos Agustinos	1	—	1985	—
3	I.M.I.	1	—	1998	—
3	La Loretana	1	—	1995	—
3	Libertad	1	—	1987	—
3	Los Espartanos	1	—	1984	—
3	Pirata	1	—	2018	—
3	Real Garcilaso	1	—	2011	—
3	San Simón	1	—	2013	—
3	Sport Áncash	1	—	2004	—
3	Sport Huancayo	1	—	2008	—
3	Sport Loreto	1	—	2014	—
3	Sport Pilsen	1	—	1983	—
3	Sport Rosario	1	—	2016	—
3	Total Clean	1	—	2006	—
3	Unión Comercio	1	—	2010	—
3	Unión Minas	1	—	2025	—

== Titles by region ==
Region	Nº of titles	Clubs
(La Libertad Region) La Libertad	8	Carlos A. Mannucci (2), Alfonso Ugarte de Chiclín (1), Los Espartanos (1), Libertad (1), Sport Pilsen (1), Deportivo UPAO (1), Universidad César Vallejo (1)
(Department of Piura) Piura	8	Atlético Torino (5), Atlético Grau (1), I.M.I. (1), Defensor La Bocana (1)
(Department of Lambayeque) Lambayeque	6	Juan Aurich (2), Deportivo Cañaña (1), Aurich–Cañaña (1), Carlos Stein (1), Pirata (1)
Arequipa	5	Melgar (1), Sportivo Huracán (1), Atlético Universidad (1), Total Clean (1), Binacional (1)
Ancash	4	José Gálvez (2), Sport Áncash (1), Sport Rosario (1)
(Junín Region) Junin	3	ADT (2), Sport Huancayo (1)
(Department of Cajamarca) Cajamarca	3	UTC (2), ADA (1)
(Department of Tacna) Tacna	3	Coronel Bolognesi (2), Bentín Tacna Heroica (1)
Cusco	2	Real Garcilaso (1), Deportivo Garcilaso (1)
(Department of Huánuco) Huánuco	2	León de Huánuco (2)
(Department of Ucayali) Ucayali	2	La Loretana (1), Sport Loreto (1)
(Ica Region) Ica	1	Estudiantes de Medicina (1)
Lima	1	Juventud La Palma (1)
(Loreto Region) Loreto	1	Hungaritos Agustinos (1)
(Department of Moquegua) Moquegua	1	San Simón (1)
(Department of Pasco) Pasco	1	Unión Minas (1)
(San Martín Region) San Martín	1	Unión Comercio (1)

== See also ==
- Football in Peru
- Peruvian Football Federation
- Peruvian football league system
  - Liga 1
  - Liga 2
  - Liga 3
  - Etapa Regional (1967–2014)
  - Ligas Departamentales del Perú
  - Ligas Provinciales del Peru
  - Ligas Distritales del Peru
