= 1985 Copa Perú =

Copa Perú
- Season: 1985
- Champions: Hungaritos Agustinos
- Runner up: Tejidos La Unión
- Top goalscorer: Oscar Calvo (5)

The 1985 Copa Perú season (Spanish: Copa Perú 1985), the promotion tournament of Peruvian football.

In this tournament after many qualification rounds, each one of the 24 departments in which Peru is politically divided, qualify a team. Those teams enter in the Regional round (8 groups) by geographical proximity. Some winners went to the Division Intermedia and some others with some runners-up went to the National round and then to the Final round, staged in Lima (the capital).

The champion was promoted to 1986 Torneo Descentralizado.

== Finalists teams ==
The following list shows the teams that qualified for the Final Stage.

Department	Team	Location	Mannager
Ancash	Sider Perú	Chimbote	(Peru) Oscar Villalobos
Ayacucho	Ateneo	Huanta	(Peru) José Navarrete
Ica	Sport Bolívar	Ica	
Lima	Tejidos La Unión	Jesús María, Lima	(Peru) Oscar Salas
Loreto	Hungaritos Agustinos	Iquitos	(Peru) Henry Perales
Madre de Dios	Deportivo Maldonado	Puerto Maldonado	(Peru) Jorge Pita

== Final Stage ==
=== Standings ===
Pos	Team	Pld	W	D	L	GF	GA	GD	Pts	Promotion
1	Hungaritos Agustinos (C)	5	3	2	0	13	7	+6	8	1986 Torneo Descentralizado
2	Tejidos La Unión	5	3	2	0	7	2	+5	8	
3	Sport Bolívar	5	1	3	1	4	3	+1	5	
4	Sider Perú	5	1	2	2	4	7	−3	4	
5	Ateneo	5	2	0	3	3	6	−3	4	
6	Deportivo Maldonado	5	0	1	4	4	10	−6	1	

(C) Champions

=== Results ===
==== Round 1 ====
1 December 1985	Tejidos La Unión	2–0	Deportivo Maldonado	Nacional, Lima

1 December 1985	Ateneo	1–0	Sport Bolívar	Nacional, Lima

1 December 1985	Hungaritos Agustinos	5–1	Sider Perú	Nacional, Lima

==== Round 2 ====
4 December 1985	Hungaritos Agustinos	2–1	Ateneo	Nacional, Lima
16:00	Jorge Navas 70'; Jaime Fernández 90+3'		Gálvez 75'

4 December 1985	Sider Perú	1–1	Deportivo Maldonado	Nacional, Lima
18:00	Segundo Angulo 9'		Elías Galdós 29' (pen.)	Referee: Julio Arévalo

4 December 1985	Tejidos La Unión	0–0	Sport Bolívar	Nacional, Lima
20:00				Referee: Alberto Tejada

==== Round 3 ====
8 December 1985	Ateneo	1–0	Deportivo Maldonado	Nacional, Lima
12:00	Néstor Fernández 67'

8 December 1985	Tejidos La Unión	1–0	Sider Perú	Nacional, Lima
14:00

8 December 1985	Hungaritos Agustinos	1–1	Sport Bolívar	Nacional, Lima
16:00				Attendance: 10,341; Referee: Walter Chatter

==== Round 4 ====
11 December 1985	Sport Bolívar	0–0	Sider Perú	Nacional, Lima

11 December 1985	Tejidos La Unión	2–0	Ateneo	Nacional, Lima
Note: Original score was 0-0; but as Ateneo used incorrectly 3 players, the result was modified.

11 December 1985	Hungaritos Agustinos	3–2	Deportivo Maldonado	Nacional, Lima

==== Round 5 ====
15 December 1985	Sider Perú	2–0	Ateneo	Nacional, Lima

15 December 1985	Sport Bolívar	3–1	Deportivo Maldonado	Nacional, Lima

15 December 1985	Hungaritos Agustinos	2–2	Tejidos La Unión	Nacional, Lima

==== Tiebreaker ====
18 December 1985	Hungaritos Agustinos	4–0	Tejidos La Unión	Nacional, Lima

== See also ==
- 1985 Torneo Descentralizado
