= Cristian Molins =

Argentine football manager

Personal information
- Full name: Cristian José Molins
- Date of birth: 18 November 1975 (age 50)
- Place of birth: Maciel, Argentina

Team information
- Current team: UTC (interim)

Managerial career
- Years: Team
- Combate de San Lorenzo
- Club Maciel
- 2012: Blooming (assistant)
- 2012–2013: Curicó Unido (assistant)
- 2013–2014: Ñublense (assistant)
- 2014: Deportes Temuco (assistant)
- 2015–2018: Curicó Unido (youth)
- 2015: Curicó Unido (interim)
- 2018: Fernández Vial
- 2019: Colchagua (youth)
- 2019: Magallanes (assistant)
- 2020–2021: Gimnasia de Jujuy (assistant)
- 2021–2022: Gimnasia de Jujuy
- 2023: Unión de Sunchales
- 2024–2025: Güemes (assistant)
- 2025: Sarmiento La Banda
- 2026–: UTC (assistant)
- 2026: UTC (interim)
- 2026–: UTC (interim)

Cristian José Molins (born 18 November 1975) is an Argentine football manager. He is the current interim manager of Peruvian club Universidad Técnica de Cajamarca.

== Career ==
Born in Maciel, Argentina, Molins started his career coaching Combate de San Lorenzo and Club Maciel. He later developed his career in Bolivia and Chile, mainly as an assistant coach and in youth systems.

In Chile, Molins assumed as interim coach of Curicó Unido in April 2015 and as manager of Fernández Vial in April 2018.

In December 2021, Molins assumed as head coach of Gimnasia y Esgrima de Jujuy after serving as assistant coach of Arnaldo Sialle. In 2023, he led Unión de Sunchales.

In April 2025, Molins assumed as manager of Sarmiento de La Banda after serving as assistant coach in Güemes.

In May 2026, Molins moved to Peru and joined the technical staff of Cristian Paulucci in Universidad Técnica de Cajamarca.
