= Comercial Aguas Verdes =

Peruvian football club

Aguas Verdes
- Full name: Club Deportivo Comercial Aguas Verdes
- Founded: March 21, 1971
- Ground: Estadio 24 de Julio, Zarumilla
- League: Copa Perú
Home colours	Away colours

Club Deportivo Comercial Aguas Verdes (sometimes referred as Comercial Aguas Verdes) is a Peruvian football club, playing in the city of Zarumilla, Zarumilla, Peru.

== History ==
The Club Deportivo Comercial Aguas Verdes was founded on March 21, 1971.

In the 1979 Copa Perú, the club was runner-up when it tied with ADT on the last round.

In the 2009 Copa Perú, the club qualified to the Departamental Stage, but was eliminated.

In the 2016 Copa Perú, the club qualified to the National Stage, but was eliminated by EGB Tacna Heróica in the Quarterfinals.

== Honours ==
=== Regional ===
- Liga Departamental de Tumbes:

Winners (3): 1977, 1978, 1985
Runner-up (1): 2016

- Liga Provincial de Zarumilla:

Winners (5): 1976, 1977, 1978, 2009, 2016

- Liga Distrital de Zarumilla:

Winners (4): 1998, 1999, 2015, 2016
Runner-up (3): 2009, 2010, 2012

== See also ==
- List of football clubs in Peru
- Peruvian football league system
