= 1981 Copa Perú =

Copa Perú
- Season: 1981
- Champions: UTC
- Top goalscorer: Walter Minetto (5)

The 1981 Copa Perú season (Spanish: Copa Perú 1981), the promotion tournament of Peruvian football.

In this tournament, after many qualification rounds, each one of the 24 departments in which Peru is politically divided qualified a team. Those teams, plus the team relegated from First Division on the last year, enter in two more rounds and finally 6 of them qualify for the Final round, staged in Lima (the capital).

The champion was promoted to 1982 Torneo Descentralizado.

== Finalists teams ==
The following list shows the teams that qualified for the Final Stage.

Department	Team	Location
Arequipa	Sportivo Huracán	Arequipa
Cajamarca	UTC	Cajamarca
Cusco	Deportivo Garcilaso	Cusco
Ica	Defensor Mayta Cápac	Chincha
Lima	Juventud La Palma	Lima
Piura	Atlético Grau	Piura

== Final Stage ==
=== Standings ===
Pos	Team	Pld	W	D	L	GF	GA	GD	Pts	Promotion
1	UTC	5	5	0	0	9	2	+7	10	1982 Torneo Descentralizado
2	Juventud La Palma	5	2	2	1	7	5	+2	6	
3	Atlético Grau	5	2	2	1	5	4	+1	6	
4	Defensor Mayta Cápac	5	2	0	3	5	5	0	4	
5	Sportivo Huracán	5	1	1	3	4	9	−5	3	
6	Deportivo Garcilaso	5	0	1	4	4	9	−5	1	

=== Round 1 ===
8 November 1981	Juventud La Palma	0–0	Atlético Grau	Nacional, Lima

8 November 1981	Defensor Mayta Cápac	1–0	Deportivo Garcilaso	Nacional, Lima

8 November 1981	UTC	2–0	Sportivo Huracán	Nacional, Lima

=== Round 2 ===
11 November 1981	Juventud La Palma	2–1	Defensor Mayta Cápac	Nacional, Lima

11 November 1981	Sportivo Huracán	2–1	Deportivo Garcilaso	Nacional, Lima

11 November 1981	UTC	2–1	Atlético Grau	Nacional, Lima

=== Round 3 ===
15 November 1981	Atlético Grau	2–1	Deportivo Garcilaso	Nacional, Lima

15 November 1981	Defensor Mayta Cápac	3–1	Sportivo Huracán	Nacional, Lima

15 November 1981	UTC	2–1	Juventud La Palma	Nacional, Lima

=== Round 4 ===
18 November 1981	Juventud La Palma	2–0	Sportivo Huracán	Nacional, Lima

18 November 1981	Atlético Grau	1–0	Defensor Mayta Cápac	Nacional, Lima

18 November 1981	UTC	2–0	Deportivo Garcilaso	Nacional, Lima

=== Round 5 ===
22 November 1981	Juventud La Palma	2–2	Deportivo Garcilaso	Nacional, Lima

22 November 1981	Atlético Grau	1–1	Sportivo Huracán	Nacional, Lima

22 November 1981	UTC	1–0	Defensor Mayta Cápac	Nacional, Lima
