= 2016 Torneo de Promoción y Reservas =

Torneo de Promoción y Reservas
- Season: 2016
- Champions: Sporting Cristal

The Torneo de Promoción y Reservas is a football tournament in Peru. There are currently 16 clubs in the league. Each team will have a roster of twelve 21-year-old players, three 19-year-olds, and three older reinforcements; whenever they be recorded in the club. The tournament will offer the champion two bonus points and the runner-up one bonus point to the respective regular teams in the 2016 Torneo Descentralizado.

== Teams ==
=== Stadia and locations ===
Locations of the 2016 Torneo de Promoción y Reserva teams

| Team | City | Stadium | Capacity |
|---|---|---|---|
| Alianza Atlético | Sullana | Melanio Colona | 5,000 |
| Alianza Lima | Lima | Alejandro Villanueva | 35,000 |
| Ayacucho | Ayacucho | Ciudad de Cumaná | 15,000 |
| Comerciantes Unidos | Cutervo | Juan Maldonado Gamarra | 8,000 |
| Defensor La Bocana | Sechura | Sesquicentenario | 5,000 |
| Deportivo Municipal | Lima | Iván Elías Moreno | 10,000 |
| Juan Aurich | Chiclayo | Elías Aguirre | 24,500 |
| Melgar | Arequipa | Virgen de Chapi | 60,000 |
| Real Garcilaso | Cusco | Garcilaso | 42,056 |
| Sport Huancayo | Huancayo | Estadio Huancayo | 20,000 |
| Sporting Cristal | Lima | Alberto Gallardo | 18,000 |
| Unión Comercio | Nueva Cajamarca | IPD de Moyobamba | 7,500 |
| Universidad César Vallejo | Trujillo | Mansiche | 25,000 |
| Universidad San Martín | Callao | Miguel Grau | 17,000 |
| UTC | Cajamarca | Héroes de San Ramón | 18,000 |
| Universitario | Lima | Monumental | 80,093 |

== Torneo Descentralizado ==
=== Torneo Apertura ===
==== Standings ====
| Pos | Team | Pld | W | D | L | GF | GA | GD | Pts | Qualification |
|---|---|---|---|---|---|---|---|---|---|---|
| 1 | Sporting Cristal | 15 | 13 | 2 | 0 | 44 | 11 | +33 | 41 | Bonus +1 to 2016 Torneo Descentralizado |
| 2 | Universitario | 15 | 8 | 2 | 5 | 27 | 20 | +7 | 26 | |
| 3 | Sport Huancayo | 15 | 8 | 2 | 5 | 28 | 28 | 0 | 26 | |
| 4 | Universidad San Martín | 15 | 7 | 4 | 4 | 26 | 23 | +3 | 25 | |
| 5 | Unión Comercio | 15 | 7 | 3 | 5 | 17 | 13 | +4 | 24 | |
| 6 | Melgar | 15 | 5 | 6 | 4 | 23 | 15 | +8 | 21 | |
| 7 | Alianza Lima | 15 | 6 | 2 | 7 | 20 | 21 | −1 | 20 | |
| 8 | UTC | 15 | 6 | 2 | 7 | 22 | 24 | −2 | 20 | |
| 9 | Defensor La Bocana | 15 | 6 | 2 | 7 | 20 | 24 | −4 | 20 | |
| 10 | Ayacucho | 15 | 6 | 2 | 7 | 22 | 28 | −6 | 20 | |
| 11 | Juan Aurich | 15 | 5 | 4 | 6 | 25 | 25 | 0 | 19 | |
| 12 | Real Garcilaso | 15 | 6 | 0 | 9 | 22 | 30 | −8 | 18 | |
| 13 | Universidad César Vallejo | 15 | 5 | 2 | 8 | 16 | 19 | −3 | 17 | |
| 14 | Deportivo Municipal | 15 | 4 | 4 | 7 | 27 | 31 | −4 | 16 | |
| 15 | Alianza Atlético | 15 | 4 | 2 | 9 | 18 | 29 | −11 | 14 | |
| 16 | Comerciantes Unidos | 15 | 4 | 1 | 10 | 11 | 27 | −16 | 13 | |

Updated to match(es) played on unknown. Source:

==== Results ====
| Home \ Away | AAS | ALI | AYA | COM | MUN | JA | BOC | MEL | RGA | CRI | SHU | UCO | UCV | USM | UTC | UNI |
|---|---|---|---|---|---|---|---|---|---|---|---|---|---|---|---|---|
| Alianza Atlético | | | | 2–0 | | 0–3 | 1–2 | 1–0 | | | | 2–0 | | 1–2 | 0–1 | |
| Alianza Lima | 3–2 | | 2–0 | | | | | | 3–0 | 0–4 | 0–1 | | 1–0 | | | 2–1 |
| Ayacucho | 2–2 | | | 4–0 | | | | 1–0 | | | 3–1 | 3–2 | | 2–3 | 0–2 | 1–0 |
| Comerciantes Unidos | | 1–0 | | | | 2–1 | 1–1 | 0–1 | 1–0 | | | | | 1–2 | 3–0 | |
| Deportivo Municipal | 0–0 | 1–3 | 6–0 | 3–1 | | | | | | | 1–1 | | 4–2 | | | 2–3 |
| Juan Aurich | | 0–0 | 1–2 | | 3–3 | | 2–1 | | 2–0 | 1–2 | 2–3 | | 0–2 | | | |
| Defensor La Bocana | | 1–0 | 2–1 | | 1–2 | | | | 3–0 | 0–1 | 3–1 | 1–2 | 1–0 | | | |
| Melgar | | 4–3 | | | 5–0 | 1–1 | 6–0 | | 1–0 | 0–0 | | 0–0 | | | | |
| Real Garcilaso | 4–2 | | 4–2 | | 3–0 | | | | | 1–2 | 5–4 | | 2–1 | | | 2–1 |
| Sporting Cristal | 5–2 | | 1–1 | 3–0 | 4–3 | | | | | | 8–0 | 2–0 | | 3–0 | | 3–0 |
| Sport Huancayo | 2–0 | | | 3–0 | | | | 1–1 | | | | 1–4 | 4–0 | 2–1 | 2–0 | 2–0 |
| Unión Comercio | | 2–1 | | 1–0 | 2–0 | 0–1 | | | 2–0 | | | | | 1–0 | 0–0 | |
| Universidad César Vallejo | 1–2 | | 2–0 | 2–0 | | | | 2–0 | | 0–2 | | 0–0 | | | | 0–2 |
| Universidad San Martín | | 2–0 | | | 2–2 | 4–4 | 4–3 | 2–2 | 3–0 | | | | 0–0 | | 1–0 | |
| UTC | | 2–2 | | | 1–0 | 2–3 | 2–0 | 3–1 | 3–1 | 3–4 | | | 1–4 | | | |
| Universitario | 4–1 | | | 4–1 | | 3–1 | 1–1 | 1–1 | | | | 2–1 | | 2–0 | 3–2 | |

Updated to match(es) played on 2016. Source: ADFP - official fixture
Legend: Blue = home team win; Yellow = draw; Red = away team win.

=== Torneo Clausura ===
==== Standings ====
| Pos | Team | Pld | W | D | L | GF | GA | GD | Pts | Qualification |
|---|---|---|---|---|---|---|---|---|---|---|
| 1 | Sporting Cristal | 30 | 23 | 4 | 3 | 80 | 32 | +48 | 73 | Bonus +1 to 2016 Torneo Descentralizado |
| 2 | Universitario | 30 | 17 | 6 | 7 | 58 | 27 | +31 | 57 | |
| 3 | Unión Comercio | 30 | 14 | 8 | 8 | 41 | 34 | +7 | 50 | |
| 4 | Universidad César Vallejo | 30 | 14 | 3 | 13 | 41 | 42 | −1 | 45 | |
| 5 | Melgar | 30 | 10 | 11 | 9 | 39 | 32 | +7 | 41 | |
| 6 | Universidad San Martín | 30 | 11 | 8 | 11 | 46 | 44 | +2 | 41 | |
| 7 | Sport Huancayo | 30 | 11 | 8 | 11 | 47 | 53 | −6 | 41 | |
| 8 | Juan Aurich | 30 | 12 | 7 | 11 | 49 | 42 | +7 | 43 | |
| 9 | Deportivo Municipal | 30 | 11 | 7 | 12 | 54 | 50 | +4 | 40 | |
| 10 | Alianza Lima | 30 | 11 | 7 | 12 | 38 | 35 | +3 | 40 | |
| 11 | Ayacucho | 30 | 11 | 6 | 13 | 40 | 53 | −13 | 39 | |
| 12 | Real Garcilaso | 30 | 11 | 2 | 17 | 44 | 56 | −12 | 35 | |
| 13 | Defensor La Bocana | 30 | 10 | 5 | 15 | 35 | 51 | −16 | 35 | |
| 14 | Alianza Atlético | 30 | 9 | 5 | 16 | 34 | 51 | −17 | 32 | |
| 15 | Comerciantes Unidos | 30 | 9 | 4 | 17 | 28 | 52 | −24 | 31 | |
| 16 | UTC | 30 | 6 | 9 | 15 | 34 | 54 | −20 | 27 | |

Updated to match(es) played on unknown. Source:

==== Results ====
| Home \ Away | AAS | ALI | AYA | COM | MUN | JA | BOC | MEL | RGA | CRI | SHU | UCO | UCV | USM | UTC | UNI |
|---|---|---|---|---|---|---|---|---|---|---|---|---|---|---|---|---|
| Alianza Atlético | | 0–0 | 1–0 | | 1–1 | | | | 2–1 | 1–4 | 2–2 | | 2–1 | | | 0–1 |
| Alianza Lima | | | | 2–1 | 0–1 | 1–1 | 0–1 | 0–0 | | | | 4–1 | | 1–0 | 2–2 | |
| Ayacucho | | 2–2 | | | 1–1 | 2–1 | 3–1 | | 2–1 | 1–4 | | | 2–0 | | | |
| Comerciantes Unidos | 4–0 | | 2–0 | | 2–1 | | | | | 1–3 | 2–2 | 0–1 | 1–2 | | | 0–6 |
| Deportivo Municipal | | | | | | 2–3 | 4–0 | 2–1 | 2–0 | 4–3 | | 0–1 | | 3–3 | 2–1 | |
| Juan Aurich | 1–2 | | | 5–0 | | | | 1–0 | | | | 0–1 | | 1–0 | 3–0 | 2–1 |
| Defensor La Bocana | 1–0 | | | 1–2 | | 1–2 | | 2–2 | | | | | | 3–1 | 3–0 | 0–5 |
| Melgar | 2–0 | | 0–0 | 0–0 | | | | | | | 3–0 | | 1–3 | 1–0 | 1–1 | 2–1 |
| Real Garcilaso | | 2–1 | | 0–1 | | 1–1 | 1–0 | 3–1 | | | | 3–0 | | 4–1 | 1–1 | |
| Sporting Cristal | | 2–1 | | | | 2–0 | 0–0 | 3–0 | 5–3 | | | | 3–0 | | 3–1 | |
| Sport Huancayo | | 0–1 | 0–0 | | 0–3 | 1–1 | 3–0 | | 3–0 | 1–1 | | | | | | |
| Unión Comercio | 3–2 | | 4–1 | | | | 1–1 | 1–2 | | 3–2 | 1–1 | | 3–1 | | | 0–0 |
| Universidad César Vallejo | | 0–3 | | | 2–1 | 3–2 | 3–1 | | 3–2 | | 2–1 | | | 2–1 | 3–0 | |
| Universidad San Martín | 1–0 | | 4–1 | 2–1 | | | | | | 0–1 | 5–1 | 1–1 | | | | 1–1 |
| UTC | 2–0 | | 0–2 | 0–0 | | | | | | | 2–3 | 3–3 | | 0–0 | | 1–1 |
| Universitario | | 1–0 | 4–1 | | 1–0 | | | | 2–0 | 5–0 | 2–0 | | 0–0 | | | |

Updated to match(es) played on 2016. Source: ADFP - official fixture
Legend: Blue = home team win; Yellow = draw; Red = away team win.

=== Aggregate table ===
| Pos | Team | Pld | W | D | L | GF | GA | GD | Pts | Qualification |
|---|---|---|---|---|---|---|---|---|---|---|
| 1 | Sporting Cristal | 30 | 23 | 4 | 3 | 80 | 32 | +48 | 73 | Bonus +1 to 2016 Torneo Descentralizado |
| 2 | Universitario | 30 | 17 | 6 | 7 | 58 | 27 | +31 | 57 | Bonus +1 to 2016 Torneo Descentralizado |
| 3 | Unión Comercio | 30 | 14 | 8 | 8 | 41 | 34 | +7 | 50 | |
| 4 | Universidad César Vallejo | 30 | 14 | 3 | 13 | 41 | 42 | −1 | 45 | |
| 5 | Melgar | 30 | 10 | 11 | 9 | 39 | 32 | +7 | 41 | |
| 6 | Universidad San Martín | 30 | 11 | 8 | 11 | 46 | 44 | +2 | 41 | |
| 7 | Sport Huancayo | 30 | 11 | 8 | 11 | 47 | 53 | −6 | 41 | |
| 8 | Juan Aurich | 30 | 12 | 7 | 11 | 49 | 42 | +7 | 43 | |
| 9 | Deportivo Municipal | 30 | 11 | 7 | 12 | 54 | 50 | +4 | 40 | |
| 10 | Alianza Lima | 30 | 11 | 7 | 12 | 38 | 35 | +3 | 40 | |
| 11 | Ayacucho | 30 | 11 | 6 | 13 | 40 | 53 | −13 | 39 | |
| 12 | Real Garcilaso | 30 | 11 | 2 | 17 | 44 | 56 | −12 | 35 | |
| 13 | Defensor La Bocana | 30 | 10 | 5 | 15 | 35 | 51 | −16 | 35 | |
| 14 | Alianza Atlético | 30 | 9 | 5 | 16 | 34 | 51 | −17 | 32 | |
| 15 | Comerciantes Unidos | 30 | 9 | 4 | 17 | 28 | 52 | −24 | 31 | |
| 16 | UTC | 30 | 6 | 9 | 15 | 34 | 54 | −20 | 27 | |

Updated to match(es) played on unknown. Source:

== Copa Modelo Centenario ==
=== Group stage ===
==== Zone 1 ====
| Pos | Team | Pld | W | D | L | GF | GA | GD | Pts | Qualification |
|---|---|---|---|---|---|---|---|---|---|---|
| 1 | Juan Aurich | 12 | 5 | 4 | 3 | 30 | 16 | +14 | 19 | Second stage |
| 2 | Alianza Atlético | 12 | 4 | 6 | 2 | 16 | 19 | −3 | 18 | Second stage |
| 3 | Comerciantes Unidos | 12 | 3 | 5 | 4 | 15 | 22 | −7 | 14 | |
| 4 | Defensor La Bocana | 12 | 1 | 7 | 4 | 19 | 23 | −4 | 10 | |

Updated to match(es) played on unknown. Source:

===== Results =====
====== Matches 1–6 ======
| Home \ Away | AAS | COM | BOC | JUA |
|---|---|---|---|---|
| Alianza Atlético | | 4–1 | 1–1 | 2–1 |
| Comerciantes Unidos | 0–0 | | 4–0 | 2–0 |
| Defensor La Bocana | 3–3 | 3–0 | | 4–4 |
| Juan Aurich | 6–0 | 7–1 | 1–1 | |

Updated to match(es) played on unknown. Source:
Legend: Blue = home team win; Yellow = draw; Red = away team win.

====== Matches 7–12 ======
| Home \ Away | AAS | COM | BOC | JUA |
|---|---|---|---|---|
| Alianza Atlético | | 0–0 | 1–1 | 2–0 |
| Comerciantes Unidos | 0–0 | | 2–1 | 1–3 |
| Defensor La Bocana | 1–2 | 3–3 | | 0–0 |
| Juan Aurich | 5–1 | 1–1 | 2–1 | |

Updated to match(es) played on unknown. Source:
Legend: Blue = home team win; Yellow = draw; Red = away team win.

==== Zone 2 ====
| Pos | Team | Pld | W | D | L | GF | GA | GD | Pts | Qualification |
|---|---|---|---|---|---|---|---|---|---|---|
| 1 | Universidad César Vallejo | 12 | 6 | 4 | 2 | 27 | 12 | +15 | 22 | Second stage |
| 2 | Universitario | 12 | 5 | 4 | 3 | 16 | 9 | +7 | 19 | Second stage |
| 3 | Unión Comercio | 12 | 6 | 1 | 5 | 14 | 14 | 0 | 19 | |
| 4 | UTC | 12 | 2 | 1 | 9 | 5 | 27 | −22 | 7 | |

Updated to match(es) played on unknown. Source:

===== Results =====
====== Matches 1–6 ======
| Home \ Away | UCO | UCV | UTC | UNI |
|---|---|---|---|---|
| Unión Comercio | | 2–1 | 7–0 | 0–0 |
| Universidad César Vallejo | 4–0 | | 6–1 | 2–2 |
| UTC | 1–0 | 1–1 | | 0–1 |
| Universitario | 0–1 | 1–2 | 4–0 | |

Updated to match(es) played on unknown. Source:
Legend: Blue = home team win; Yellow = draw; Red = away team win.

====== Matches 7–12 ======
| Home \ Away | UCO | UCV | UTC | UNI |
|---|---|---|---|---|
| Unión Comercio | | 1–0 | 2–0 | 1–0 |
| Universidad César Vallejo | 5–0 | | 3–1 | 1–1 |
| UTC | 1–0 | 0–1 | | 0–1 |
| Universitario | 2–0 | 2–2 | 2–0 | |

Updated to match(es) played on unknown. Source:
Legend: Blue = home team win; Yellow = draw; Red = away team win.

==== Zone 3 ====
| Pos | Team | Pld | W | D | L | GF | GA | GD | Pts | Qualification |
|---|---|---|---|---|---|---|---|---|---|---|
| 1 | Sporting Cristal | 12 | 10 | 1 | 1 | 40 | 17 | +23 | 31 | Second stage |
| 2 | Universidad San Martín | 12 | 6 | 1 | 5 | 24 | 25 | −1 | 19 | Second stage |
| 3 | Alianza Lima | 12 | 4 | 3 | 5 | 22 | 25 | −3 | 15 | |
| 4 | Deportivo Municipal | 12 | 1 | 1 | 10 | 12 | 31 | −19 | 4 | |

Updated to match(es) played on unknown. Source:

===== Results =====
====== Matches 1–6 ======
| Home \ Away | ALI | MUN | CRI | USM |
|---|---|---|---|---|
| Alianza Lima | | 3–1 | 3–5 | 2–2 |
| Deportivo Municipal | 0–2 | | 1–3 | 4–2 |
| Sporting Cristal | 2–1 | 5–2 | | 4–2 |
| Universidad San Martín | 4–1 | 3–1 | 1–0 | |

Updated to match(es) played on unknown. Source:
Legend: Blue = home team win; Yellow = draw; Red = away team win.

====== Matches 7–12 ======
| Home \ Away | ALI | MUN | CRI | USM |
|---|---|---|---|---|
| Alianza Lima | | 2–1 | 0–2 | 1–3 |
| Deportivo Municipal | 1–1 | | 0–4 | 0–2 |
| Sporting Cristal | 3–3 | 3–1 | | 6–1 |
| Universidad San Martín | 1–3 | 1–0 | 2–3 | |

Updated to match(es) played on unknown. Source:
Legend: Blue = home team win; Yellow = draw; Red = away team win.

==== Zone 4 ====
| Pos | Team | Pld | W | D | L | GF | GA | GD | Pts | Qualification |
|---|---|---|---|---|---|---|---|---|---|---|
| 1 | Melgar | 12 | 7 | 2 | 3 | 18 | 15 | +3 | 23 | Second stage |
| 2 | Sport Huancayo | 12 | 6 | 3 | 3 | 21 | 11 | +10 | 21 | Second stage |
| 3 | Real Garcilaso | 12 | 4 | 1 | 7 | 13 | 19 | −6 | 13 | |
| 4 | Ayacucho | 12 | 3 | 2 | 7 | 18 | 15 | +3 | 11 | |

Updated to match(es) played on unknown. Source:

===== Results =====
====== Matches 1–6 ======
| Home \ Away | AYA | MEL | GAR | SHU |
|---|---|---|---|---|
| Ayacucho | | 0–3 | 2–1 | 0–1 |
| Melgar | 3–1 | | 2–1 | 1–0 |
| Real Garcilaso | 1–0 | 1–0 | | 2–1 |
| Sport Huancayo | 0–0 | 0–0 | 3–1 | |

Updated to match(es) played on unknown. Source:
Legend: Blue = home team win; Yellow = draw; Red = away team win.

====== Matches 7–12 ======
| Home \ Away | AYA | MEL | GAR | SHU |
|---|---|---|---|---|
| Ayacucho | | 1–0 | 2–1 | 1–2 |
| Melgar | 3–2 | | 0–0 | 2–1 |
| Real Garcilaso | 2–1 | 2–3 | | 0–3 |
| Sport Huancayo | 2–2 | 6–1 | 2–1 | |

Updated to match(es) played on unknown. Source:
Legend: Blue = home team win; Yellow = draw; Red = away team win.

=== Second stage ===
==== Group A ====
| Pos | Team | Pld | W | D | L | GF | GA | GD | Pts | Qualification | USM | CRI | JUA | AAS |
|---|---|---|---|---|---|---|---|---|---|---|---|---|---|---|
| 1 | Universidad San Martín | 3 | 2 | 1 | 0 | 10 | 4 | +6 | 7 | Semifinals | | 1–1 | | 5–2 |
| 2 | Sporting Cristal | 3 | 2 | 1 | 0 | 5 | 8 | −3 | 7 | Semifinals | | | | 4–0 |
| 3 | Juan Aurich | 3 | 1 | 0 | 2 | 5 | 8 | −3 | 3 | | 1–4 | 0–1 | | |
| 4 | Alianza Atlético | 3 | 0 | 0 | 3 | 5 | 13 | −8 | 0 | | | | 2–3 | |

Updated to match(es) played on unknown. Source:

==== Group B ====
| Pos | Team | Pld | W | D | L | GF | GA | GD | Pts | Qualification | UNI | UCV | MEL | SHU |
|---|---|---|---|---|---|---|---|---|---|---|---|---|---|---|
| 1 | Universitario | 3 | 2 | 1 | 0 | 5 | 1 | +4 | 7 | Semifinals | | 1–1 | | 2–0 |
| 2 | Universidad César Vallejo | 3 | 1 | 2 | 0 | 6 | 5 | +1 | 5 | Semifinals | | | 2–1 | 3–3 |
| 3 | Melgar | 3 | 1 | 0 | 2 | 3 | 5 | −2 | 3 | | 0–2 | | | |
| 4 | Sport Huancayo | 3 | 0 | 1 | 2 | 4 | 7 | −3 | 1 | | | | 1–2 | |

Updated to match(es) played on unknown. Source:

=== Semi-finals ===
| 1 December 2016 | Universidad San Martín | 3–3 (4–2 p) | Universidad César Vallejo | Villa Deportiva Nacional |

| 1 December 2016 | Universitario | 2–2 (2–4 p) | Sporting Cristal | Villa Deportiva Nacional |

=== Final ===
| 4 December 2016 | Sporting Cristal | 2–0 | Universidad San Martín | Villa Deportiva Nacional |

== See also ==
- 2016 Torneo Descentralizado
