= 1977 Copa Perú =

Peruvian football season

Copa Perú
- Season: 1977
- Champions: Atlético Torino
- Top goalscorer: Humberto Correa (6)

The 1977 Copa Perú season (Spanish: Copa Perú 1977), the promotion tournament of Peruvian football.

In this tournament, after many qualification rounds, each one of the 24 departments in which Peru is politically divided qualified a team. Those teams, plus the team relegated from First Division on the last year, enter in two more rounds and finally 6 of them qualify for the Final round, staged in Lima (the capital).

The champion was promoted to 1978 Torneo Descentralizado.

== Finalists teams ==
The following list shows the teams that qualified for the Final Stage.

Department	Team	Location
Arequipa	Pesca Perú	Arequipa
Cajamarca	UTC	Cajamarca
Ica	José Carlos Mariátegui	Ica
Junín	ADT	Tarma
Lima	Juventud La Palma	Huacho
Piura	Atlético Torino	Talara

== Final Stage ==
=== Standings ===
Pos	Team	Pld	W	D	L	GF	GA	GD	Pts	Promotion
1	Atlético Torino (C)	5	3	2	0	15	10	+5	8	1978 Torneo Descentralizado
2	Juventud La Palma	5	2	1	2	11	9	+2	5	
3	Pesca Perú	5	2	1	2	9	10	−1	5	
4	ADT	5	1	3	1	7	8	−1	5	
5	UTC	5	1	2	2	7	8	−1	4	
6	José Carlos Mariátegui	5	0	3	2	5	9	−4	3	

(C) Champions

=== Round 1 ===
25 September 1977	Atlético Torino	2–2	UTC	Nacional, Lima

25 September 1977	ADT	1–1	José Carlos Mariátegui	Nacional, Lima

25 September 1977	Pesca Perú	3–2	Juventud La Palma	Nacional, Lima

=== Round 2 ===
28 September 1977	Atlético Torino	4–3	Juventud La Palma	Nacional, Lima

28 September 1977	ADT	3–2	UTC	Nacional, Lima

28 September 1977	Pesca Perú	2–2	José Carlos Mariátegui	Nacional, Lima

=== Round 3 ===
1 October 1977	UTC	0–0	José Carlos Mariátegui	Nacional, Lima

1 October 1977	Atlético Torino	4–1	Pesca Perú	Nacional, Lima

1 October 1977	Juventud La Palma	0–0	ADT	Nacional, Lima

=== Round 4 ===
5 October 1977	Atlético Torino	3–2	José Carlos Mariátegui	Nacional, Lima

5 October 1977	Juventud La Palma	3–2	UTC	Nacional, Lima

5 October 1977	Pesca Perú	3–1	ADT	Nacional, Lima

=== Round 5 ===
8 October 1977	UTC	1–0	Pesca Perú	Nacional, Lima

8 October 1977	Juventud La Palma	3–0	José Carlos Mariátegui	Nacional, Lima

8 October 1977	Atlético Torino	2–2	ADT	Nacional, Lima
