= 1979 Torneo Descentralizado =

Torneo Descentralizado
- Season: 1979
- Dates: 1 April 1979 – 9 February 1980
- Champions: Sporting Cristal
- Relegated: León de Huánuco
- Copa Libertadores: Sporting Cristal; Sporting Cristal
- Top goalscorer: José Leyva (28 goals)

The 1979 Torneo Descentralizado, the top category of Peruvian football (soccer), was played by 16 teams. The national champion was Sporting Cristal.

The season was divided into 2 stages. On the first stage, top 8 teams qualified to play for the championship with a points bonus of 3, 2 and 1 for the top 3; bottom eight qualified to play for relegation with a points penalty of -1, -2 and -3 for bottom three. Teams entered the second stage without carrying their whole season records. As three teams tied on points the last place of Relegation Group they had to enter a Relegation Playoff that was played in Lima.

== Teams ==
=== Team changes ===
Promoted from 1978 Copa Perú	Relegated from 1978 Primera División
▲ Juventud La Palma (1st)	▼ Defensor Lima (16th)

=== Stadia locations ===
Locations of the 1979 Primera División teams

Team	City	Stadium	Capacity	Field
Alfonso Ugarte	Puno	Enrique Torres Belón	20,000	Grass
Alianza Lima	La Victoria, Lima	Alejandro Villanueva	35,000	Grass
Atlético Chalaco	Callao	Miguel Grau	15,000	Grass
Atlético Torino	Talara	Campeonísimo	8,000	Grass
CNI	Iquitos	Max Augustín	24,000	Grass
Coronel Bolognesi	Tacna	Jorge Basadre	19,850	Grass
Deportivo Junín	Huancayo	Huancayo	20,000	Grass
Deportivo Municipal	Cercado de Lima	Nacional	45,750	Grass
Juan Aurich	Chiclayo	Elías Aguirre	24,500	Grass
Juventud La Palma	Huacho	Segundo Aranda Torres	12,000	Grass
León de Huánuco	Huánuco	Heraclio Tapia	15,000	Grass
Melgar	Arequipa	Mariano Melgar	20,000	Grass
Sport Boys	Callao	Miguel Grau	15,000	Grass
Sporting Cristal	Rímac, Lima	Nacional	45,750	Grass
Unión Huaral	Huaral	Julio Lores Colan	10,000	Grass
Universitario	Breña, Lima	Nacional	45,750	Grass

== First Stage ==
=== Standings ===
Pos	Team	Pld	W	D	L	GF	GA	GD	Pts	Qualification
1	Universitario	30	16	9	5	44	19	+25	41	Liguilla Final, Bonus +3
2	Juan Aurich	30	13	12	5	30	24	+6	38	Liguilla Final, Bonus +2
3	Sporting Cristal	30	10	15	5	46	26	+20	35	Liguilla Final, Bonus +1
4	Alianza Lima	30	12	9	9	48	26	+22	33	Liguilla Final
5	Alfonso Ugarte	30	14	5	11	42	43	−1	33	Liguilla Final
6	Unión Huaral	30	8	15	7	32	29	+3	31	Liguilla Final
7	Atlético Chalaco	30	9	13	8	28	27	+1	31	Liguilla Final
8	Deportivo Junín	30	11	8	11	39	43	−4	30	Liguilla Final
9	León de Huánuco	30	12	6	12	32	42	−10	30	Liguilla Descenso
10	Sport Boys	30	11	7	12	35	37	−2	29	Liguilla Descenso
11	Deportivo Municipal	30	11	6	13	30	34	−4	28	Liguilla Descenso
12	CNI	30	10	8	12	33	45	−12	28	Liguilla Descenso
13	Coronel Bolognesi	30	11	5	14	36	40	−4	27	Liguilla Descenso
14	Atlético Torino	30	7	10	13	25	37	−12	24	Liguilla Descenso, Penalty -1
15	Juventud La Palma	30	6	10	14	21	32	−11	22	Liguilla Descenso, Penalty -2
16	Melgar	30	6	8	16	26	43	−17	20	Liguilla Descenso, Penalty -3

=== Results ===
Home \ Away	UGA	ALI	CHA	TOR	CNI	BOL	JUN	MUN	AUR	JLP	LEO	MEL	SBA	CRI	HUA	UNI
Alfonso Ugarte		3–1	–	–	–	–	–	–	–	–	–	–	2–0	1–0	–	2–0
Alianza Lima	8–1		1–0	2–1	8–0	1–2	4–0	1–3	0–0	0–0	4–1	3–0	3–0	0–0	0–0	1–0
Atlético Chalaco	–	1–0		–	–	–	–	–	–	–	–	–	1–1	0–0	–	1–1
Atlético Torino	–	1–1	–		–	–	–	–	–	–	–	–	1–1	0–0	–	0–1
CNI	–	2–0	–	–		–	–	–	–	–	–	–	1–0	2–2	–	0–1
Coronel Bolognesi	–	0–2	–	–	–		–	–	1–1	–	–	–	1–0	0–0	–	1–0
Deportivo Junín	–	1–0	–	–	–	–		–	–	–	–	–	1–0	0–0	–	1–1
Deportivo Municipal	–	0–3	–	–	–	–	–		–	–	–	–	0–1	0–1	–	1–2
Juan Aurich	–	0–0	–	–	–	4–2	–	–		–	–	–	0–2	0–0	–	0–2
Juventud La Palma	–	2–0	–	–	–	–	–	–	–		–	–	1–2	1–1	–	0–2
León de Huánuco	–	1–1	–	–	–	–	1–1	–	–	–		–	1–0	1–0	–	2–3
Melgar	–	1–1	–	–	–	–	–	–	–	–	–		2–3	2–7	–	0–0
Sport Boys	2–2	2–0	2–1	1–1	0–0	3–1	3–2	2–3	1–2	0–1	1–2	2–1		0–2	3–1	0–0
Sporting Cristal	7–0	4–2	3–1	3–0	2–2	0–0	3–2	0–1	3–1	2–2	1–1	3–0	0–2		0–0	1–1
Unión Huaral	–	0–0	–	–	–	–	–	–	–	–	–	–	1–1	3–0		0–1
Universitario	2–1	0–1	1–0	2–1	0–0	4–0	3–0	0–1	5–0	1–1	3–0	2–1	3–0	1–1	2–2	

Updated to match(es) played on 1979. Source:
Legend: Blue = home team win; Yellow = draw; Red = away team win.

== Liguilla Final ==
=== Standings ===
Pos	Team	Pld	W	D	L	GF	GA	GD	BP	Pts	Qualification	CRI	CHA	JAU	ALI	ALF	UNI	JUN	HUA
1	Sporting Cristal (C)	14	9	4	1	26	8	+18	1	23	1980 Copa Libertadores		1–0	1–0	1–0	3–1	3–0	6–1	2–1
2	Atlético Chalaco	14	7	5	2	17	7	+10	0	19	1980 Copa Libertadores	0–0		–	0–0	–	1–0	–	–
3	Juan Aurich	14	6	4	4	16	11	+5	2	18		1–0	–		2–1	–	1–0	–	–
4	Alianza Lima	14	5	7	2	16	13	+3	0	17		1–1	1–0	1–0		2–1	1–1	1–0	3–2
5	Alfonso Ugarte	14	4	5	5	16	20	−4	0	13		1–1	–	–	1–1		1–0	–	–
6	Universitario	14	2	4	8	11	19	−8	3	11		0–2	1–2	2–2	1–1	0–1		2–0	2–2
7	Deportivo Junín	14	3	5	6	13	28	−15	0	11		1–1	–	–	2–2	–	1–0		–
8	Unión Huaral	14	1	4	9	17	26	−9	0	6		1–4	–	–	2–2	–	1–2	–	

Legend: Blue = home team win; Yellow = draw; Red = away team win.
(C) Champions

== Liguilla Descenso ==
=== Standings ===
Pos	Team	Pld	W	D	L	GF	GA	GD	BP	Pts	Relegation	SBA	BOL	MEL	TOR	MUN	CNI	JLP	LEÓ
9	Sport Boys	14	7	3	4	24	19	+5	0	17			5–2	1–1	1–0	3–4	1–0	0–1	6–3
10	Coronel Bolognesi	14	5	4	5	15	16	−1	0	14		0–0		–	–	–	–	–	–
11	Melgar	14	6	4	4	16	12	+4	−3	13		4–0	–		–	–	–	–	–
12	Atlético Torino	14	6	2	6	17	14	+3	−1	13		3–2	–	–		–	–	–	–
13	Deportivo Municipal	14	4	5	5	15	19	−4	0	13		0–1	–	–	–		–	–	–
14	CNI	14	5	2	7	13	12	+1	0	12	Relegation play-off	1–2	–	–	–	–		–	–
15	Juventud La Palma	14	5	4	5	13	15	−2	−2	12	Relegation play-off	0–0	–	–	–	–	–		–
16	León de Huánuco	14	6	0	8	15	21	−6	0	12	Relegation play-off	0–2	–	–	–	–	–	–	

Legend: Blue = home team win; Yellow = draw; Red = away team win.

== Relegation play-off ==
=== Standings ===
Pos	Team	Pld	W	D	L	GF	GA	GD	Pts	Relegation	CNI	JLP	LEÓ
1	CNI	2	2	0	0	4	1	+3	4			2–1	
2	Juventud La Palma	2	1	0	1	3	2	+1	2				2–0
3	León de Huánuco (R)	2	0	0	2	0	4	−4	0	1980 Copa Perú	0–2		

Legend: Blue = home team win; Yellow = draw; Red = away team win.
(R) Relegated

=== Results ===
3 February 1980
20:00

Juventud La Palma	2–0	León de Huánuco
Hirano 12' (pen.); Casquel 19'

Estadio Nacional, Lima
Attendance: 9,917
Referee: José Ramírez
6 February 1980
20:00

León de Huánuco	0–2 (W.O.)	CNI

Estadio Nacional, Lima
Referee: Pedro Reyes
9 February 1980
20:00

CNI	2–1	Juventud La Palma
Del Águila 17'; Perales 44'		Quijandría 86'

Estadio Nacional, Lima
Attendance: 1,125
Referee: Carlos Montalván

== See also ==
- 1979 Copa Perú
