= Junior Huerto =

Peruvian footballer (born 1999)

Personal information
- Full name: Carlos Junior Huerto Saavedra
- Date of birth: 26 April 1999 (age 27)
- Place of birth: Lima, Peru
- Height: 1.84 m (6 ft 0 in)
- Position: Left-back

Team information
- Current team: UTC
- Number: 5

Youth career
- Universidad San Martín

Senior career*
Years	Team	Apps	(Gls)
2016–2019	Universidad San Martín	57	(4)
2020–2023	Sporting Cristal	8	(0)
2021	→ Universidad San Martín (loan)	15	(0)
2022	→ Sport Boys (loan)	3	(0)
2022	→ Cantolao (loan)	10	(0)
2023	→ Cantolao (loan)	23	(1)
2024	Universidad San Martín	9	(0)
2024	Unión Santo Domingo		
2025	Deportivo Coopsol	0	(0)
2025	Atlante	0	(0)
2026–	UTC	0	(0)

International career
2014	Peru U-15		
2015	Peru U-17	1	(0)
2018–2019	Peru U-20	5	(0)
2019	Peru U-23	3	(0)
- * Club domestic league appearances and goals as of 2 September 2024

Carlos Junior Huerto Saavedra (born 26 April 1999) is a Peruvian footballer who plays as a left-back for UTC.

Huerto is also known by his nickname 'Checho'.

== Club career ==
=== Universidad San Martín ===
Huerto is a product of Universidad San Martín and made his debut for the club in November 2016. He became a regular starter in the 2018 season with four goals in 30 games. In 2019, Huerto made 25 league appearances.

=== Sporting Cristal ===
On 4 January 2020 it was confirmed, that Huerto had joined Sporting Cristal on a deal until the end of 2023. He made his debut for the club on 1 February 2020 against UTC Cajamarca.

To get some more minutes, after playing only 422 minutes in eight games in 2020, Huerto was loaned out back to Universidad San Martín on 9 January 2021 for the entire 2021 season.

On 5 December 2021 it was confirmed, that Huerto would play the 2022 on loan at Sport Boys. However, the spell was cut short and he was instead loaned out to Cantolao in the beginning of July 2022, until the end of the year. Huerto returned to Cristal ahead of the 2023 season, and sat on the bench for one game for Cristal, before heading on a new loan spell at Cantolao.

=== Later clubs ===
After five years away, Huerto re-joined Universidad San Martín in February 2024.

On September 28, 2024, it was confirmed that Huerto had joined Unión Santo Domingo.

On 18 March 2025, it was confirmed that Huerto had signed with Peruvian Segunda División side Deportivo Coopsol. However, he never made his debut for the club before moving to the Mexican club Atlante in the summer of 2025. He also failed to make any appearances in Mexico, after which Huerto returned to Peru, where he joined UTC ahead of the 2026 season.

== Estadísticas ==
=== Clubes ===
As of match played on 13 February 2026.

Club	Division	Season	League		Cup		Continental		Total	
Club	Division	Season	Apps	Goals	Apps	Goals	Apps	Goals	Apps	Goals
Universidad San Martín	Liga 1	2016	1	0	—		—		1	0
Universidad San Martín	Liga 1	2017	1	0	—		—		1	0
Universidad San Martín	Liga 1	2018	30	4	—		—		30	4
Universidad San Martín	Liga 1	2019	24	0	3	0	—		27	0
Sporting Cristal	Liga 1	2020	8	0	—		1	0	9	0
Universidad San Martín	Liga 1	2021	15	0	—		—		15	0
Sport Boys	Liga 1	2022	3	0	—		2	0	5	0
Cantolao	Liga 1	2022	10	0	—		—		10	0
Cantolao	Liga 1	2023	23	1	—		—		23	1
Cantolao	Total		33	1	0	0	0	0	33	1
Universidad San Martín	Liga 2	2024	10	0	—		—		10	0
Universidad San Martín	Total		81	4	3	0	0	0	84	4
UTC	Liga 1	2026	2	1	—		—		2	1
Career total			127	6	3	0	3	0	133	6
