= Henry Perales =

Peruvian footballer and manager (1947–2021)

Personal information
- Full name: Victor Henry Perales Vargas
- Date of birth: 30 March 1947
- Place of birth: Trujillo, Peru
- Date of death: 23 July 2021 (aged 74)
- Height: 1.79 m (5 ft 10 in)
- Position: Midfielder

Senior career*
Years	Team	Apps	(Gls)
1967–1968	Defensor Arica		
1969	Centro Iqueño		
1970	Defensor Arica		
1971	A.D.O.		
1972	Deportivo Municipal		
1973–1977	C.N.I.		
1978	Alianza Lima		
1979–1980	C.N.I.		
1981	Atlético Chalaco		
1982	C.N.I.		

International career
1976	Peru	3	(0)

Managerial career
- 1985–1986: Hungaritos Agustinos
- 1987: Capitán Clavero
- 1988: C.N.I.
- 1992: C.N.I.
- 1995–1996: La Loretana
- 1997: La Loretana
- * Club domestic league appearances and goals

Victor Henry Perales Vargas (30 March 1947 – 23 July 2021) was a Peruvian footballer who played as an attacking midfielder.

== Playing career ==
Nicknamed El Chejo, Henry Perales began his career with Defensor Arica in 1967. He played in the 1970 Copa Libertadores with this club for one match.

He spent the majority of his career in the 1970s with CNI of Iquitos. In 1977, he helped CNI win the league. He was recruited the following year by Alianza Lima, where he won the 1978 league title and played in the 1978 Copa Libertadores for three matches.

He returned to CNI where he ended his career in 1982 after a brief stint with Atlético Chalaco in 1981.

A Peruvian international, Henry Perales played three friendly matches for Peru, all in 1976.

== Managerial career ==
After becoming a coach, Henry Perales won the Copa Perú twice, in 1985 with Hungaritos Agustinos and then ten years later, in 1995, with La Loretana.

== Death ==
Perales died on 23 July 2021, at the age of 74.

== Honours ==
=== Player ===
Alianza Lima

- Torneo Descentralizado: 1978

=== Manager ===
Hungaritos Agustinos

- Copa Perú: 1985

La Loretana

- Copa Perú: 1995
