= 1979 Copa Perú =

Copa Perú
- Season: 1979
- Champions: ADT
- Top goalscorer: Julio Garcia-Lapouble (3)

The 1979 Copa Perú season (Spanish: Copa Perú 1979), the promotion tournament of Peruvian football.

In this tournament, after many qualification rounds, each one of the 24 departments in which Peru is politically divided qualified a team. Those teams, plus the team relegated from First Division on the last year, enter in two more rounds and finally 6 of them qualify for the Final round, staged in Lima (the capital).

The champion was promoted to 1980 Torneo Descentralizado.

== Finalists teams ==
The following list shows the teams that qualified for the Final Stage.

Department	Team	Location
Ayacucho	Centenario	Ayacucho
Cajamarca	UTC	Cajamarca
Cusco	Deportivo Garcilaso	Cusco
Junín	ADT	Tarma
Lima	Defensor Lima	Lima
Tumbes	Comercial Aguas Verdes	Tumbes

== Representación Regional ==
For this season, the Copa Perú was reorganized, and the Peruvian Football Federation established that the teams that had qualified for the National Stage of the 1978 Copa Perú, but failed to secure promotion to the Peruvian Primera División, would have to face the team qualified from their respective Departmental Tournament for a place in the Regional Stage.

The winner of this playoff tie would be awarded the departmental championship title for that season.

Team 1	Agg.	Team 2	1st leg	2nd leg
San Cristóbal de Moro	2–0	José Gálvez	2–0	0–0
Octavio Espinosa	3–3	José Carlos Mariátegui	2–1	1–2
Ex Alumnos Agustinos	2–0	Deportivo Aviación	2–0	3–0
Defensor Chicrín	2–5	Unión Minas	1–1	1–4

=== Tiebreaker ===
Team 1	Agg.	Team 2	1st leg	2nd leg
Octavio Espinosa	2–1	José Carlos Mariátegui	2–1	1–2

== National Stage ==
=== Group I ===
Pos	Team	Pld	W	D	L	GF	GA	GD	Pts	Qualification	UTC	COM	HOS
1	UTC	0	0	0	0	0	0	0	0	Final Stage		–	–
2	Comercial Aguas Verdes	0	0	0	0	0	0	0	0	Final Stage	–		–
3	Deportivo Hospital	0	0	0	0	0	0	0	0		–	–	

Legend: Blue = home team win; Yellow = draw; Red = away team win.

=== Group II ===
Pos	Team	Pld	W	D	L	GF	GA	GD	Pts	Qualification	ADT	DEF	PAP	SIM
1	ADT	6	4	2	0	0	0	0	10	Final Stage		–	–	–
2	Defensor Lima	6	3	1	2	0	0	0	7	Final Stage	–		–	–
3	Papelera Atlas	6	1	3	2	0	0	0	5		–	–		–
4	Deportivo SIMA	6	0	2	4	0	0	0	2		–	–	–	

Legend: Blue = home team win; Yellow = draw; Red = away team win.

=== Group III ===
Pos	Team	Pld	W	D	L	GF	GA	GD	Pts	Qualification	GAR	CEN	PES
1	Deportivo Garcilaso	4	3	0	1	0	0	0	6	Final Stage		–	–
2	Centenario	4	1	1	2	0	0	0	3	Final Stage	–		–
3	Pesca Perú	4	1	1	2	0	0	0	3		–	–	

Legend: Blue = home team win; Yellow = draw; Red = away team win.

== Final Stage ==
=== Standings ===
Pos	Team	Pld	W	D	L	GF	GA	GD	Pts	Promotion
1	ADT (C)	5	3	2	0	5	1	+4	8	1980 Torneo Descentralizado
2	Comercial Aguas Verdes	5	3	1	1	9	2	+7	7	
3	Defensor Lima	5	2	1	2	8	6	+2	5	
4	Deportivo Garcilaso	5	2	1	2	8	6	+2	5	
5	UTC	5	2	1	2	3	3	0	5	
6	Centenario	5	0	0	5	1	16	−15	0	

(C) Champions

=== Round 1 ===
30 September 1979	Deportivo Garcilaso	3–0	Centenario	Nacional, Lima

30 September 1979	Defensor Lima	2–1	Comercial Aguas Verdes	Nacional, Lima

30 September 1979	ADT	1–0	UTC	Nacional, Lima

=== Round 2 ===
3 October 1979	Defensor Lima	4–0	Centenario	Nacional, Lima

3 October 1979	ADT	1–1	Deportivo Garcilaso	Nacional, Lima

3 October 1979	Comercial Aguas Verdes	1–0	UTC	Nacional, Lima

=== Round 3 ===
7 October 1979	UTC	1–0	Deportivo Garcilaso	Nacional, Lima

7 October 1979	Comercial Aguas Verdes	5–0	Centenario	Nacional, Lima

7 October 1979	ADT	1–0	Defensor Lima	Nacional, Lima

=== Round 4 ===
10 October 1979	Comercial Aguas Verdes	2–0	Deportivo Garcilaso	Nacional, Lima

10 October 1979	Defensor Lima	0–0	UTC	Nacional, Lima

10 October 1979	ADT	2–0	Centenario	Nacional, Lima

=== Round 5 ===
14 October 1979	UTC	2–1	Centenario	Nacional, Lima

14 October 1979	Deportivo Garcilaso	4–2	Defensor Lima	Nacional, Lima

14 October 1979	ADT	0–0	Comercial Aguas Verdes	Nacional, Lima
