= 1978 Torneo Descentralizado =

Torneo Descentralizado
- Season: 1978
- Dates: 8 July 1978 – 21 January 1979
- Champions: Alianza Lima
- Relegated: Defensor Lima
- Copa Libertadores: Alianza Lima; Universitario
- Top goalscorer: Juan José Oré (19 goals)

The 1978 Torneo Descentralizado, the top category of Peruvian football (soccer), was played by 16 teams. The national champion was Alianza Lima.

The season was divided into 2 stages. A Preliminary Tournament contested in two groups; this was a friendly tournament to keep teams occupied as the National Team was preparing for the 1978 World Cup Finals. The second stage was the Decentralized (league tournament); the top 2 qualified for Copa Libertadores and the last team was relegated.

== Teams ==
=== Team changes ===
Promoted from 1977 Copa Perú	Relegated from 1977 Primera División
▲ Atlético Torino (1st)	▼ Cienciano (16th)

=== Stadia locations ===
Locations of the 1978 Primera División teams

Team	City	Stadium	Capacity	Field
Alfonso Ugarte	Puno	Enrique Torres Belón	20,000	Grass
Alianza Lima	La Victoria, Lima	Alejandro Villanueva	35,000	Grass
Atlético Chalaco	Callao	Miguel Grau	15,000	Grass
Atlético Torino	Talara	Campeonísimo	8,000	Grass
CNI	Iquitos	Max Augustín	24,000	Grass
Coronel Bolognesi	Tacna	Jorge Basadre	19,850	Grass
Defensor Lima	Breña, Lima	Nacional	45,750	Grass
Deportivo Junín	Huancayo	Huancayo	20,000	Grass
Deportivo Municipal	Cercado de Lima	Nacional	45,750	Grass
Juan Aurich	Chiclayo	Elías Aguirre	24,500	Grass
León de Huánuco	Huánuco	Heraclio Tapia	15,000	Grass
Melgar	Arequipa	Mariano Melgar	20,000	Grass
Sport Boys	Callao	Telmo Carbajo	15,000	Grass
Sporting Cristal	Rímac, Lima	Nacional	45,750	Grass
Unión Huaral	Huaral	Julio Lores Colan	10,000	Grass
Universitario	Breña, Lima	Nacional	45,750	Grass

== Torneo Interzonal ==
=== Grupo Norte ===
Pos	Team	Pld	W	D	L	GF	GA	GD	Pts	Qualification	HUA	AUR	JUN	SBA	UNI	TOR	CNI	CRI
1	Unión Huaral	14	7	5	2	25	16	+9	19	Liguilla Final		3–0	0–0	2–1	0–0	3–1	0–0	2–0
2	Juan Aurich	14	8	3	3	24	16	+8	19	Liguilla Final	5–3		2–0	2–0	2–1	1–3	1–0	4–0
3	Deportivo Junín	14	6	6	2	23	18	+5	18		2–1	1–1		3–2	1–1	5–0	2–1	4–3
4	Sport Boys	14	5	4	5	23	22	+1	14		2–4	1–2	1–1		1–0	3–0	2–1	3–2
5	Universitario	14	4	5	5	16	15	+1	13		2–2	1–2	0–0	1–3		2–1	1–0	3–0
6	Atlético Torino	14	5	3	6	20	24	−4	13		1–2	1–1	2–2	1–1	2–1		1–0	4–0
7	CNI	14	3	4	7	11	13	−2	10		1–1	0–0	3–0	2–2	0–2	0–1		2–0
8	Sporting Cristal	14	2	2	10	14	32	−18	6		1–2	2–1	1–2	1–1	1–1	3–2	0–1	

Source: RSSSF Peru 1978
Legend: Blue = home team win; Yellow = draw; Red = away team win.

=== Grupo Sur ===
Pos	Team	Pld	W	D	L	GF	GA	GD	Pts	Qualification	ALI	BOL	DEF	UGA	MUN	LEO	MEL	CHA
1	Alianza Lima	14	7	5	2	27	13	+14	19	Liguilla Final		1–2	3–2	2–1	3–0	1–1	3–1	4–1
2	Coronel Bolognesi	14	8	3	3	18	16	+2	19	Liguilla Final	0–3		3–2	1–0	0–2	3–1	1–0	1–0
3	Defensor Lima	14	6	3	5	21	19	+2	15		3–2	0–0		5–1	0–3	1–0	3–1	2–1
4	Alfonso Ugarte	14	4	6	4	19	17	+2	14		0–0	1–1	1–1		5–1	3–0	1–0	2–1
5	Deportivo Municipal	14	5	4	5	20	21	−1	14		1–1	2–3	0–1	1–1		3–1	2–2	1–0
6	León de Huánuco	14	4	5	5	13	17	−4	13		1–1	1–2	0–0	2–1	1–1		1–0	2–0
7	Melgar	14	3	6	5	13	15	−2	12		0–0	2–0	1–0	1–1	2–0	0–0		0–0
8	Atlético Chalaco	14	1	4	9	13	26	−13	6		0–3	1–1	3–1	1–1	1–3	1–2	3–3	

Source: RSSSF Peru 1978
Legend: Blue = home team win; Yellow = draw; Red = away team win.

=== Liguilla Final ===
Pos	Team	Pld	W	D	L	GF	GA	GD	Pts	HUA	BOL	AUR	ALI
1	Unión Huaral	6	3	1	2	11	8	+3	7		2–1	0–1	3–2
2	Coronel Bolognesi	6	3	1	2	10	8	+2	7	2–1		4–1	2–1
3	Juan Aurich	6	1	4	1	4	6	−2	6	1–1	1–1		0–0
4	Alianza Lima	6	1	2	3	6	9	−3	4	1–4	2–0	0–0	

Source: https://www.rsssf.org/tablesp/peru78.html
Legend: Blue = home team win; Yellow = draw; Red = away team win.

== Torneo Descentralizado ==
=== Standings ===
Pos	Team	Pld	W	D	L	GF	GA	GD	Pts	Qualification or relegation
1	Alianza Lima (C)	30	20	4	6	63	20	+43	44	1979 Copa Libertadores
2	Universitario	30	21	1	8	62	28	+34	43	1979 Copa Libertadores
3	Sporting Cristal	30	18	6	6	61	28	+33	42	
4	Juan Aurich	30	13	12	5	39	25	+14	38	
5	Sport Boys	30	12	10	8	44	37	+7	34	
6	Melgar	30	12	9	9	39	34	+5	33	
7	León de Huánuco	30	10	10	10	27	35	−8	30	
8	Atlético Chalaco	30	10	8	12	37	43	−6	28	
9	CNI	30	9	10	11	28	35	−7	28	
10	Coronel Bolognesi	30	9	10	11	30	41	−11	28	
11	Unión Huaral	30	10	6	14	39	51	−12	26	
12	Atlético Torino	30	9	6	15	35	47	−12	24	
13	Deportivo Municipal	30	8	6	16	25	32	−7	22	
14	Alfonso Ugarte	30	8	6	16	44	59	−15	22	
15	Deportivo Junín	30	8	5	17	36	62	−26	21	
16	Defensor Lima (R)	30	6	5	19	40	72	−32	17	1979 Copa Perú

(C) Champions; (R) Relegated

=== Results ===
Home \ Away	UGA	ALI	CHA	TOR	CNI	BOL	DEF	JUN	MUN	AUR	LEO	MEL	SBA	CRI	HUA	UNI
Alfonso Ugarte		1–1	2–2	7–0	6–2	4–3	1–1	2–0	2–0	0–0	0–2	1–2	0–0	2–0	2–0	3–1
Alianza Lima	9–0		2–0	1–0	2–1	0–1	1–2	3–0	1–0	2–0	6–0	3–1	2–1	4–0	5–1	2–1
Atlético Chalaco	3–2	1–0		3–1	1–0	1–1	4–2	0–1	0–1	0–0	1–2	2–0	2–0	1–3	2–2	0–0
Atlético Torino	4–0	1–0	1–2		1–1	3–0	2–1	2–1	1–0	1–3	2–1	0–0	1–2	0–2	3–3	0–1
CNI	2–1	1–0	2–1	1–2		3–0	0–0	1–0	1–0	1–1	0–1	0–0	2–2	0–0	2–1	0–0
Coronel Bolognesi	2–1	0–2	3–0	1–1	1–1		0–0	2–1	1–1	1–3	3–2	0–0	1–1	1–0	1–2	2–0
Defensor Lima	5–2	2–5	3–3	3–2	0–2	1–2		4–1	1–3	0–2	1–3	0–1	1–5	0–5	1–1	2–4
Deportivo Junín	1–0	2–2	3–0	2–1	1–1	1–0	5–3		1–0	1–1	1–2	2–3	2–2	0–1	2–2	3–2
Deportivo Municipal	2–0	0–1	0–1	0–0	3–1	0–0	1–2	3–2		0–1	0–1	1–1	0–1	1–0	4–1	0–2
Juan Aurich	1–1	0–0	2–2	2–0	0–0	2–0	4–1	3–1	1–1		3–1	3–2	0–0	4–2	2–1	0–2
León de Huánuco	1–0	0–1	2–1	1–1	1–1	0–0	0–1	1–0	0–0	0–0		1–0	2–2	0–0	0–0	0–2
Melgar	2–1	0–3	3–1	0–1	2–1	2–1	4–1	5–0	1–0	2–0	1–1		3–1	0–0	3–3	0–1
Sport Boys	1–0	1–1	1–0	2–1	3–0	1–1	1–0	4–1	2–1	0–0	2–1	0–0		2–5	5–1	0–2
Sporting Cristal	6–1	2–1	1–1	3–2	3–0	5–0	3–0	5–0	2–1	1–0	1–1	0–0	2–1		5–2	3–2
Unión Huaral	3–0	0–1	0–1	1–0	0–1	3–1	3–1	2–1	0–1	0–1	1–0	1–0	3–0	1–0		0–3
Universitario	3–2	1–2	3–1	3–1	2–0	0–1	2–1	5–0	4–1	2–0	4–0	5–1	2–1	0–1	3–1	

Updated to match(es) played on 1978. Source: RSSSF Peru 1978
Legend: Blue = home team win; Yellow = draw; Red = away team win.

== Top scorers ==
Player	Nationality	Goals	Club
Juan José Oré	Peru	19	Universitario

== See also ==
- 1978 Copa Perú
