= Alan Woodward (footballer, born 1947) =

English footballer

Personal information
- Date of birth: 19 June 1947 (age 79)
- Place of birth: Stanton Hill, England
- Position: Winger

Senior career*
Years	Team	Apps	(Gls)
1968–1970	Alfreton Town	98	(47)
1970–1973	Grimsby Town	54	(13)
- * Club domestic league appearances and goals

Alan Woodward (born 19 June 1947) is an English former professional association footballer who played as a winger.

His career was ended in October 1971 by a knee injury sustained against Gillingham in a third round League Cup replay. He won a Division 4 Championship Medal in May 1972. After retiring in May 1973 he returned to teaching. In the 1980s he was appointed part-time Youth Team Coach at Grimsby Town F.C. and was responsible for a number of young players who went on to have successful playing careers. In 1983-84 the Grimsby Town FC Youth Team coached by Woodward won the Northern Intermediate League for the only time in their history. Alan returned to teaching in 1973. He had graduated with a Bachelor of Education Degree in Physical Education and Geography from Loughborough College Of Education in 1965. He taught in several schools in Grimsby and Cleethorpes, most notably as Deputy Headteacher of Welholme School during much of the 1990's. Alan retired in 2009 having qualified as an Ofsted Inspector in 2000. He still lives in the area.
