= Juventud La Palma =

- Full name: Juventud La Palma
- Nicknames: Celestes, Palmeños
- Founded: 7 September 1950; 75 years ago
- Ground: Segundo Aranda Torres
- League: Copa Perú
Home colours	Away colours

Juventud La Palma is a Peruvian football club, playing in the city of Huacho, Peru. The club was founded on 7 September 1950.

== History ==
The club was the 1978 Copa Perú champion, when it defeated Pesca Peru (Mollendo), UTC (Cajamarca), ADT (Tarma), José Carlos Mariátegui (Ica) and Deportivo Aviación (Iquitos).

The club has played at the highest level of Peruvian football on seven occasions, from 1979 until 1980, and 1984 until 1987, when it was relegated.

In 1988, the club lost on penalties in the second division championship final to Defensor Lima. They finished as runners-up in the second division again the following year (behind Sport Boys). Juventud La Palma played in second division until 1994. Since then, they have played in the Huacho District League.

== Honours ==
=== National ===
- Peruvian Segunda División:

Runner-up (2): 1988, 1989

- Copa Perú:

Winners (1): 1978
Runner-up (2): 1977, 1981

=== Regional ===
- Liga Departamental de Lima:

Winners (2): 1972, 1976
Runner-up (1): 1974

- Liga Distrital de Huacho:

Winners (5): 1954, 1971, 1972, 1974
Runner-up (1): 2015

- Segunda División Distrital de Huacho:

Winners (2): 1953, 2012

- Tercera División Distrital de Huacho:

Winners (2): 1952, 2008

== Notable players ==
- Enrique Bravo
- José "Caté" Carranza
- Miguel Angel Dietz Calderon
- Martín Duffó
- Gustavo Durán
- Luis Farromeque
- Jaime Herbozo
- Darío "Chacal" Herrera
- William Huapaya
- Héctor La Torre
- Javier Lovera
- Rodulfo Manzo
- Pedro "Viroco" Meza
- Walter Minetto
- Freddy Pacherres
- Alfonso Pando
- Gustavo Pimentel
- Enrique Quintana
- Jorge "Coco" Ramírez
- Wilson Ramírez
- William Vidarte

== See also ==
- List of football clubs in Peru
- Peruvian football league system
