= Aldo Anzuini =

Italian footballer and coach (born 1947)

Personal information
- Date of birth: 24 April 1947 (age 79)
- Place of birth: Rome, Italy
- Height: 1.86 m (6 ft 1 in)
- Position: Defender

Senior career*
Years	Team	Apps	(Gls)
1966–1967	Lazio	11	(0)
1967–1968	→ Lanerosa Vicenza (loan)	0	(0)
1968–1971	Savona	64	(0)
1971–1976	Sambenedettese	146	(0)
1976–1981	A.L.M.A.S.	151	(3)

Managerial career
- 1986–1987: L'Aquila
- 1992–1993: Astrea
- * Club domestic league appearances and goals as of 19 February 2015

Aldo Anzuini (born 24 April 1947) is an Italian retired football player and coach. He played as defender.

== Honours ==
Serie B

- Lazio: 1968–69

Serie C

- Sambenedettese: 1973–74
