= Universidad Técnica de Cajamarca =

- Full name: Universidad Técnica de Cajamarca
- Nicknames: El Gavilán del Norte; La UTC; Cremas del Norte
- Founded: 1964
- Stadium: Estadio Héroes de San Ramón
- Chairman: Joaquín Ramírez
- Manager: Cristian Molins
- League: Liga 1
- 2026: Liga 1, 18th of 18
| Home colours | Away colours | Third colours |

The Universidad Técnica de Cajamarca (usually referred to as UTC) is a Peruvian football club based in the city of Cajamarca, Peru. It was founded in 1964 and play in the Peruvian Primera División which is the top tier of Peruvian football. The team plays its home games at the Estadio Héroes de San Ramón.

== History ==
UTC was officially founded on July 14, 1964 by Oswaldo Silva Marín and Wílder Tejada Arribasplata, clerks at Universidad Técnica de Cajamarca, known today as Universidad Nacional de Cajamarca (National University of Cajamarca), with the aim of giving the university a place in the local soccer league. Prior to that date, the club had been playing for three months in the local league alongside Club Juventud Victoria as one team, before the official foundation date.

In 1970, UTC wins the local league of the District of Cajamarca and again in 1971 through 1974. They would go on to also win the Liga Departamental de Cajamarca in that same time.

The club was 1981 Copa Perú champion, when it defeated Atlético Grau, Juventud La Palma, Deportivo Garcilaso, and Sportivo Huracán. The club have played at the highest level of Peruvian football on twelve occasions, from 1982 Torneo Descentralizado until 1993 Torneo Descentralizado when it was relegated. In the 1985 Torneo Descentralizado, they were Runners-up and fell short to Universitario in the Liguilla Final stage by four points. They qualified for the 1986 Copa Libertadores as a result and got eliminated in the Group Stage with three points.

In the 2011 Torneo Intermedio, the club was eliminated by Real Garcilaso in the Round of 16. In the 2011 Copa Perú, the club qualified to the National Stage, but was eliminated by Los Caimanes.

UTC won the 2012 Copa Perú under manager Rafael Castillo after defeating Alfonso Ugarte in the final. The club won 2–0 at home in Cajamarca and lost 3–2 in Puno, but won due to a better goal difference. With the win, they qualified for the 2013 Torneo Descentralizado, the top flight of Peruvian football; they finished sixth and classified for the second international tournament in their history, the 2014 Copa Sudamericana. In 2018, 2019, and 2021 UTC qualified for the Copa Sudamericana and got eliminated in the First Stage in every edition.

UTC failed to avoid relegation in the 2026 season of the Peruvian first division, confirming their drop to the second division following a 1–0 defeat to Cienciano with five matches left in the tournament.

== Stadium ==
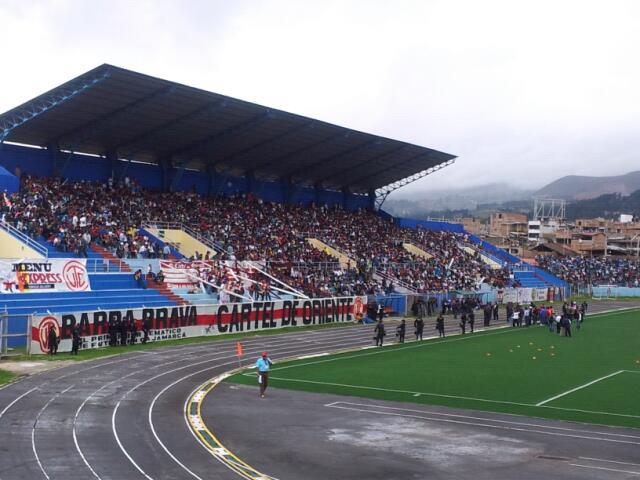
UTC fans at Estadio Héroes de San Ramón

UTC's home stadium is Estadio Héroes de San Ramón located in Cajamarca. Opened in 1942, the stadium has a capacity of 10,495. The name comes from the battle of San Pablo, where 3 students from the Colegio San Ramón de Cajamarca offered their lives during the War of the Pacific, in which the Peruvian army defeated the Chilean army. For the 2024 season, the club played at Estadio Germán Contreras Jara which has a capacity of 6,300.

== Players ==
As of 16 March, 2026

Note: Flags indicate national team as defined under FIFA eligibility rules; some limited exceptions apply. Players may hold more than one non-FIFA nationality.

| No. | Pos. | Nation | Player |
|---|---|---|---|
| 1 | GK | PER | Ángelo Campos |
| 2 | DF | ARG | Bruno Duarte |
| 3 | DF | PER | Manuel Ganoza |
| 4 | DF | PER | Koichi Aparicio |
| 5 | DF | PER | Junior Huerto |
| 6 | DF | PER | Francesco Cavagna |
| 7 | FW | PER | Jhosep Núñez |
| 8 | MF | PER | David Dioses |
| 9 | FW | ECU | Marlon de Jesús |
| 10 | MF | PER | Marcos Lliuya |
| 11 | FW | PAN | Abdiel Arroyo |
| 13 | DF | PER | Dylan Caro |

| No. | Pos. | Nation | Player |
|---|---|---|---|
| 14 | FW | PER | Michel Rasmussen |
| 15 | MF | PER | Joshua Cantt (on loan from Sport Boys) |
| 16 | MF | VEN | Arquímedes Figuera |
| 17 | DF | PER | Luis Garro |
| 18 | FW | PER | Santiago Gálvez |
| 19 | FW | ECU | Adolfo Muñoz |
| 21 | GK | PER | Ricardo Bettocchi |
| 22 | FW | COL | David Camacho |
| 27 | MF | PER | Piero Serra |
| 29 | GK | URU | Ignacio Barrios |
| 35 | DF | PER | Gilmar Paredes |
| 88 | MF | ECU | Luis Arce |

== Honours ==
=== Senior titles ===
Keys

- Record
- ^{(s)} Shared record

| Type | Competition | Titles | Runner-up | Winning years | Runner-up years |
|---|---|---|---|---|---|
| National (League) | Primera División | — | 1 | — | 1985 |
| National (League) | Copa Perú | 2 | 1 | 1981, 2012 | 1996 |
| Half-year / Short tournament (League) | Torneo de Verano | — | 1 | — | 2017 |
| Half-year / Short tournament (League) | Torneo Descentralizado | — | 1 | — | 1985 |
| Half-year / Short tournament (League) | Torneo Zona Norte | 1 | 4 | 1986 | 1987, 1988, 1990–I, 1990–II |
| Regional (League) | Región I | 4 | — | 1977, 1978, 1995, 1996 | — |
| Regional (League) | Región II | 5 | 1 | 1979, 1998, 2005, 2011, 2012 | 2003 |
| Regional (League) | Liga Departamental de Cajamarca | 13 | 2 | 1971, 1972, 1973, 1974, 1979, 1995, 1996, 1997, 1998, 2001, 2002, 2003, 2011 | 2004, 2005 |
| Regional (League) | Liga Superior de Cajamarca | 1 | — | 2011 | — |
| Regional (League) | Liga Provincial de Cajamarca | 4 | — | 1971, 2001, 2002, 2003 | — |
| Regional (League) | Liga Distrital de Cajamarca | 11 | — | 1970, 1971, 1972, 1973, 1974, 1975, 1976, 1977, 1978, 1979, 1980 | — |

== Performance in CONMEBOL competitions ==
| Competition | A | P | W | D | L | GF | GA |
|---|---|---|---|---|---|---|---|
| Copa Libertadores | 1 | 6 | 1 | 1 | 4 | 7 | 13 |
| Copa Sudamericana | 3 | 6 | 1 | 2 | 3 | 4 | 11 |

A = appearances, P = matches played, W = won, D = drawn, L = lost, GF = goals for, GA = goals against.

| Season | Competition | Round | | Club | Home | Away |
|---|---|---|---|---|---|---|
| 1986 | Copa Libertadores | Group Stage | (Peru) | Universitario | 1–3 | 0–2 |
| 1986 | Copa Libertadores | Group Stage | (Bolivia) | Bolívar | 2–2 | 1–2 |
| 1986 | Copa Libertadores | Group Stage | (Bolivia) | Jorge Wilstermann | 3–2 | 0–2 |
| 2014 | Copa Sudamericana | First Stage | (Colombia) | Deportivo Cali | 0–0 | 0–3 |
| 2018 | Copa Sudamericana | First Stage | (Uruguay) | Rampla Juniors | 2–0 | 0–4 |
| 2019 | Copa Sudamericana | First Stage | (Uruguay) | Cerro | 1–1 | 1–3 |
| 2021 | Copa Sudamericana | First Stage | (Peru) | Sport Huancayo | 0–1 | 0–4 |

== Managers ==
- (Peru) José Salas Jáuregui (1981–1982)
- (Peru) Ronald Amoretti (1983)
- (Peru) Pedro Cruz Navarrete (1985–1986)
- (Peru) José Salas Jáuregui (1986)
- (Peru) Gustavo Merino (1986–1987)
- (Peru) Rafael Castañeda (1987–1988)
- (Peru) José Salas Jáuregui (1988)
- (Peru) Roberto Chale (1992)
- (Peru) José Salas Jáuregui (1993)
- (Peru) Rafael Castañeda (1993)
- (Peru) Raúl Vallejos (1993–1994)
- (Peru) José Salas Jáuregui (1995–1996)
- (Peru) Julio Goycochea (1996)
- (Peru) Segundo Cruz (1997)
- (Peru) Julio Goycochea (1998)
- (Peru) Rufino Bernales (1999)
- (Peru) Alberto Chia Li (2000)
- (Peru) Benjamín Rodríguez (2001)
- (Peru) José Ramírez Cubas (2003)
- (Peru) Pedro Cruz (2004)
- (Peru) Rafael Castañeda (2004–2005)
- (Peru) Mario Palacios (2005)
- (Peru) José Salas Jáuregui (2005)
- (Peru) José Ramírez Cubas (2006)
- (Peru) Moisés Barack (2007)
- (Peru) Eddy Oyarzábal (2008)
- (Argentina) (Peru) Horacio Ballesteros (2008)
- (Peru) Gustavo Merino (2008)
- (Peru) Julio Goycochea (2009)
- (Peru) Tito Chumpitaz (2010–2011)
- (Peru) César Gonzales (2011)
- (Peru) Rafael Castillo (2012–2013)
- (Argentina) Carlos Galván (2014)
- (Colombia) Cheche Hernández (2014–2015)
- (Colombia) John Jairo Escobar (2015)
- (Colombia) Ricardo Martínez (2015)
- (Peru) José Salas Jáuregui (2015)
- (Peru) Edwin Arévalo (2015)
- (Peru) Javier Arce (2015)
- (Peru) Rafael Castillo (2015–2016)
- (Peru) Franco Navarro (2016–2019)
- (Argentina) Gerardo Ameli (2019)
- (Peru) Franco Navarro (2020)
- (Argentina) Pablo Garabello (2021)
- (Uruguay) Mario Viera (2021)
- (Peru) Franco Navarro (2022)
- (Argentina) Marcelo Grioni (2022–2023)
- (Peru) José Infante (2023)
- (Peru) Francisco Pizarro (2023)
- (Argentina) Carlos Ramacciotti (2023–2024)
- (Peru) Alberto Peña (2024)
- (Peru) José Infante (2024)
- (Uruguay) Guillermo Sanguinetti (2024)
- (Peru) Mauro Reyes (2025)
- (Uruguay) Pablo Bossi (2025)
- (Argentina) Hernán Lisi (2025)
- (Argentina) Carlos Bustos (2025–2026)
- (Peru) Edwin Arévalo (2026)
- (Argentina) Christian Paulucci (2026)
- (Argentina) Cristian Molins (2026–)
