= 1978 Copa Perú =

Copa Perú
- Season: 1978
- Champions: Juventud La Palma
- Top goalscorer: Jorge Ramírez (4)

The 1978 Copa Perú season (Spanish: Copa Perú 1978), the promotion tournament of Peruvian football.

In this tournament, after many qualification rounds, each one of the 24 departments in which Peru is politically divided qualified a team. Those teams, plus the team relegated from First Division on the last year, enter in two more rounds and finally 6 of them qualify for the Final round, staged in Lima (the capital).

The champion was promoted to 1979 Torneo Descentralizado.

== Finalists Teams ==
The following list shows the teams that qualified for the Final Stage.

Departament	Team	Location
Arequipa	Pesca Perú	Arequipa
Cajamarca	UTC	Cajamarca
Ica	José Carlos Mariátegui	Ica
Junín	ADT	Tarma
Lima	Juventud La Palma	Huacho
Loreto	Deportivo Aviación	Iquitos

== Final Stage ==
=== Standings ===
Pos	Team	Pld	W	D	L	GF	GA	GD	Pts	Promotion
1	Juventud La Palma (C)	5	3	2	0	7	2	+5	8	1979 Torneo Descentralizado
2	Pesca Perú	5	3	1	1	12	8	+4	7	
3	UTC	5	1	4	0	7	6	+1	6	
4	ADT	5	1	1	3	11	12	−1	3	
5	José Carlos Mariátegui	5	1	1	3	7	10	−3	3	
6	Deportivo Aviación	5	1	1	3	3	9	−6	3	

(C) Champions

=== Round 1 ===
26 November 1978	Pesca Perú	2–2	UTC	Nacional, Lima

26 November 1978	José Carlos Mariátegui	4–3	ADT	Nacional, Lima

26 November 1978	Juventud La Palma	2–0	Deportivo Aviación	Nacional, Lima

=== Round 2 ===
29 November 1978	Pesca Perú	3–2	José Carlos Mariátegui	Nacional, Lima

29 November 1978	UTC	1–1	Deportivo Aviación	Nacional, Lima

29 November 1978	Juventud La Palma	3–2	ADT	Nacional, Lima

=== Round 3 ===
3 December 1978	Pesca Perú	3–2	ADT	Nacional, Lima

3 December 1978	Deportivo Aviación	2–0	José Carlos Mariátegui	Nacional, Lima

3 December 1978	Juventud La Palma	0–0	UTC	Nacional, Lima

=== Round 4 ===
6 December 1978	ADT	2–0	Deportivo Aviación	Nacional, Lima

6 December 1978	UTC	2–1	José Carlos Mariátegui	Nacional, Lima

6 December 1978	Juventud La Palma	2–0	Pesca Perú	Nacional, Lima

=== Round 5 ===
10 December 1978	UTC	2–2	ADT	Nacional, Lima

10 December 1978	Pesca Perú	4–0	Deportivo Aviación	Nacional, Lima

10 December 1978	Juventud La Palma	0–0	José Carlos Mariátegui	Nacional, Lima
