= 1976 in association football =

The following are the football (soccer) events of the year 1976 throughout the world.

== Events ==
- Copa Libertadores 1976: Won by Cruzeiro after defeating River Plate on an aggregate score of 3–2.
- September 15 – Dutch club Roda JC makes its European debut with a defeat (2–1) in Brussels against Belgium's R.S.C. Anderlecht in the second round of the Cup Winners Cup.

== Winners club national championship ==
=== Asia ===
- Qatar – Al-Rayyan SC

=== Europe ===
- England – Liverpool
- France – AS Saint-Étienne
- Italy – Torino
- Netherlands – PSV Eindhoven
- Poland – Stal Mielec
- Scotland – Rangers
- Spain – Real Madrid
- Turkey – Trabzonspor
- West Germany – Borussia Mönchengladbach
- Yugoslavia – Partizan

=== North America ===
- Mexico – Club América
- United States / Canada:
  - Toronto Metros-Croatia (NASL)

=== South America ===
- Argentina:
  - Metropolitano – Boca Juniors
  - Nacional – Boca Juniors
- Brazil: Internacional

== International tournaments ==
- African Cup of Nations in Ethiopia (February 29 – 14 1976)
  1. Morocco
  2. Guinea
  3. Nigeria
- 1976 British Home Championship (May 6 – May 15, 1976)

Scotland

- UEFA European Football Championship in Yugoslavia (June 16 – 20 1976)
  1. Czechoslovakia
  2. West Germany
  3. Netherlands
- AFC Asian Championship in Iran (June 3 – 13 1976)
  1. Iran
  2. Kuwait
  3. China
- Olympic Games in Montreal, Canada (July 18 – 31 1976)
  1. East Germany
  2. Poland
  3. Soviet Union

== Births ==
- January 3 – Joël Bouchoucha, French professional footballer
- January 15 – Sunny Nwachukwu, Nigerian retired professional footballer
- January 18 – Pavel Mareš, Czech international footballer
- January 20 – Antti Kuismala, Finnish footballer
- January 22 – Diego Penalva, French retired professional footballer
- February 5 – John Aloisi, Australian international footballer
- February 7 – Daisuke Oku, Japanese international footballer (died 2014)
- February 13 – Maksim Proshin, former Russian professional football player
- February 19 – Fernando Falce, Uruguayan professional football referee
- February 23 – Oleksandr Sokorenko, Ukrainian football coach and former player
- February 26 – Mauro Lustrinelli, Swiss international footballer
- February 28 – Uriel Pérez, former Uruguayan footballer
- March 17 – Álvaro Recoba, Uruguayan international footballer
- March 19 – Alessandro Nesta, Italian international footballer
- March 26
  - Michael Frech, German former footballer
  - Sylvain Ovono, retired Cameroonian footballer
- March 30 – Rustam Shelayev, former Russian professional footballer
- April 1 – Clarence Seedorf, Dutch international footballer
- April 20 – Aldo Bobadilla, Paraguayan footballer
- April 23 – Darren Huckerby, English footballer and coach
- April 27 – Walter Pandiani, Uruguayan footballer
- May 2 – Amado Guevara, Honduran international footballer
- May 3 – Beto, Portuguese international footballer
- May 6 – Denny Landzaat, Dutch international footballer
- May 19 – Segundo Matamba, Ecuadorian footballer
- June 14 – Massimo Oddo, Italian international footballer
- June 19 – Denis Koretskiy, former Russian footballer
- June 23 – Patrick Vieira, French international footballer
- June 24 – Ricardo Alexandre dos Santos, Brazilian international footballer
- July 1
  - Ruud van Nistelrooy, Dutch international footballer
  - Patrick Kluivert, Dutch international footballer
- July 5 – Nuno Gomes, Portuguese international footballer
- July 10 – Lars Ricken, German international footballer
- July 13 – Yevgeni Zhelyakov, Russian professional football coach and former player
- July 16 – Carlos Humberto Paredes, Paraguayan footballer
- July 17
  - Anders Svensson, Swedish international footballer
  - Marcos Senna, Spanish international footballer
- July 21 – Giovanni Seynhaeve, retired Belgian footballer
- July 22 – Roman Baranov, Russian football coach and former player
- July 26 – Danny Ortiz, Guatemalan footballer (died 2004)
- August 6 – Paweł Gamla, Polish former professional footballer
- August 11 – Tõnis Kalde, Estonian international footballer
- August 19 – Stephan Schmidt, German footballer and manager
- August 24
  - Björn van der Doelen, Dutch footballer
  - Nordin Wooter, Surinamese-Dutch youth international
- August 26 – Giovanni Naboth, Mauritian footballer
- August 27 – Ysrael Zúñiga, Peruvian footballer
- August 28 – Federico Magallanes, Uruguayan international footballer
- August 29 – Jon Dahl Tomasson, Danish international footballer
- September 13 – Mickaël Garciau, retired French footballer
- September 18 – Ronaldo, Brazilian international footballer
- September 20 – Lewis Coady, English former professional footballer
- September 26 – Michael Ballack, German international footballer
- September 27 – Francesco Totti, Italian international footballer
- September 29 – Andriy Shevchenko, Ukrainian international footballer
- October 4 – Mauro Camoranesi, Italian international footballer
- October 26 – Ralf Oehri, Liechtensteiner former association footballer
- October 28 – Martin Lepa, Estonian footballer
- November 2 – Dúber Zapata, Peruvian retired footballer
- November 22 – Emad Bouanane, French footballer
- November 26 – José Pablo Burtovoy, Argentine footballer
- December 3 – Eran Shainzinger, Israeli footballer
- December 22 – Yuri Kolchin, former Russian footballer
- December 25 – Atko Väikmeri, Estonian footballer
- December 29 – Viktor Pyatanov, former Russian footballer
- December 31 – Yevgeni Fedotov, Russian professional football coach and former player

== Deaths ==
=== November ===
- November 3 – Giuseppe Cavanna, Italian goalkeeper, winner of the 1934 FIFA World Cup. (70)

=== December ===
- December 25 – Conduelo Píriz, Uruguayan midfielder, winner of the 1930 FIFA World Cup. (71)
