= Dúber Zapata =

Peruvian footballer (born 1976)

Personal information
- Full name: Dúber Alexander Zapata Carrillo
- Date of birth: 2 November 1976 (age 49)
- Place of birth: Zorritos, Peru
- Height: 1.72 m (5 ft 8 in)
- Position: Full-back

Senior career*
Years	Team	Apps	(Gls)
1998–1999	IMI		
2000	Alcides Vigo		
2001–2002	Juan Aurich		
2003	Deportivo Wanka		
2004	Sport Boys		
2004–2006	Alianza Atlético		
2007	Univ. César Vallejo		
2008–2010	Inti Gas	78	(0)
2011	Unión Comercio	26	(0)
2012	Alianza Unicachi	8	(0)
2012	Universitario Grau		
- * Club domestic league appearances and goals

Dúber Alexander Zapata Carrillo (born 2 November 1976) is a Peruvian former professional footballer who played as a full-back.

== Career ==
Zapata was born in Zorritos. He started his career with Copa Perú side International Marine Incorporated. He was part of the squad that won title in the 1998 Copa Perú season. As a result, his club was promoted to the Torneo Descentralizado for the 1999 season. However his side finished in last place and were relegated.

Zapata returned to the Descentralizado in 2001 playing for Chiclayo giants Juan Aurich. He played there until the 2002 season
