= Roman Baranov =

Roman Baranov may refer to:

- Roman Baranov (ice hockey) (born 1973), Soviet and Russian ice hockey player
- Roman Baranov (footballer) (born 1976), Russian football player
