= 1999 Sporting Cristal season =

Sporting Cristal
1999 season
- Stadium: San Martín de Porres, Lima
- Torneo Descentralizado: Torneo Apertura: Third (3°); Torneo Clausura: Fourth (4°); Aggregate Table: Third (3°); Third National (3°)
Home colours	Away colours	Third colours

The 1999 Sporting Cristal season were the Forty-Fourth (44.º) of the club from its foundation in 1955, Forty-Four (44) participations consecutives in the top-flight of Peruvian Primera División (of 83 Editions) with denomination Torneo Descentralizado. In Previous Season the club qualified as Runner-up National 2nd Place of the 1998 Torneo Descentralizado.

Sporting Cristal were a of twelve (12) clubs in the Thirty-Fourth edition (34.º) Torneo Descentralizado, the competition most important of the Peruvian football. The club played the Peruvian Primera División, Copa Merconorte for Second (2nd) Time and Copa Libertadores for Nineteenth (19th) Time.

== Torneo Descentralizado ==
=== Torneo Apertura ===
Pos	Team	Pld	W	D	L	GF	GA	GD	Pts
2	Alianza Lima	22	14	4	4	51	20	+31	46
3	Sporting Cristal	22	11	8	3	50	23	+27	41
4	Cienciano	22	10	5	7	32	25	+7	35

== See also ==
- Club Sporting Cristal
- 1999 Torneo Descentralizado
