= 1998 Sporting Cristal season =

Sporting Cristal
1998 season
- Stadium: San Martín de Porres, Lima
- Torneo Descentralizado: Torneo Apertura: Third (3°); Torneo Clausura: First (1°) Champion; Aggregate Table: Second (2°); Final National: Runner-up (2°); Runner-up National (2°)
Home colours	Away colours	Third colours

The 1998 Sporting Cristal season were the Forty-Third (43.º) of the club from its foundation in 1955, Forty-Three (43) participations consecutives in the top-flight of Peruvian Primera División (of 82 Editions) with denomination Torneo Descentralizado. In Previous Season the club qualified as Runner-up National 2nd Place of the 1997 Torneo Descentralizado.

Sporting Cristal were a of twelve (12) clubs in the Thirty-Third edition (33.º) Torneo Descentralizado, the competition most important of the Peruvian football. The club played the Peruvian Primera División, Copa Merconorte for First (1st) Time and Copa Libertadores for Eighteenth (18th) Time.

== Torneo Descentralizado ==
=== Torneo Apertura ===
Pos	Team	Pld	W	D	L	GF	GA	GD	Pts
2	Sport Boys	22	11	6	5	38	23	+15	39
3	Sporting Cristal	22	10	7	5	40	20	+20	37
4	Unión Minas	22	11	4	7	33	29	+4	37

== See also ==
- Club Sporting Cristal
- 1998 Torneo Descentralizado
