= 1998 FBC Melgar season =

FBC Melgar
1998 season
- Stadium: Estadio Mariano Melgar
- Torneo Descentralizado: Torneo Apertura: Nn (3°); Torneo Clausura: Nn (3°); Nn National (6°)
Home colours	Away colours	Third colours

The 1998 FBC Melgar season were the Eighty-Fourth (84.º) of the club from its foundation in 1915, Twenty-Nine (29) participations in the top-flight of Peruvian Primera División (of 82 Editions) with denomination Torneo Descentralizado. In Previous Season the club qualified as 4th Place of 1997 Torneo Descentralizado.

Melgar were a of twelve (12) clubs in the Thirty-Third edition (33.º) Torneo Descentralizado, the competition most important of the Peruvian football. The club played the Peruvian Primera División and Copa CONMEBOL for First and One-time (1st) only.

== Torneo Descentralizado ==
=== Torneo Apertura ===
Pos	Team	Pld	W	D	L	GF	GA	GD	Pts
9	Cienciano	22	6	7	9	24	27	-3	25
10	FBC Melgar	22	7	2	13	20	36	-16	23
11	Deportivo Municipal	22	6	4	12	23	48	-25	22

== See also ==
- FBC Melgar
- 1998 Torneo Descentralizado
