= Penalva (disambiguation) =

Penalva is a municipality in the state of Maranhão, Brazil.

Penalva or Peñalva may also refer to:

- Penalva do Castelo, a municipality in the district of Viseu, Portugal
  - S.C. Penalva do Castelo, its football club
- David Penalva (born 1980), Portuguese rugby union footballer
- Diego Penalva (born 1976), French footballer
- Mariana Peñalva (born 1979), Mexican multidisciplinary artist
- Toribio de Peñalva (1606–1685), Spanish military man
