= Rodolfo Chávarry =

Peruvian footballer and manager (born 1961)

Personal information
- Full name: Rodolfo Chávarry Monja
- Date of birth: 5 February 1961
- Place of birth: Cayalti, Peru
- Position: Midfielder

Senior career*
Years	Team	Apps	(Gls)
1980–1981	Juan Aurich	49	(7)
1982–1983	Universitario		
1984	Octavio Espinosa		
1985	Juventud La Joya		
?	San Agustín		
1990–1998	Lawn Tennis		

International career
1983	Peru	2	(0)

Managerial career
- 1999–2000: Lawn Tennis
- 2003–2004: Olímpico Somos Perú
- * Club domestic league appearances and goals

Rodolfo Chávarry Monja (born 5 February 1961) is a Peruvian football manager and former player.

== Playing career ==
=== Club career ===
Rodolfo Chávarry began his career with Juan Aurich of Chiclayo, playing 49 matches between 1980 and 1981. He joined Universitario de Deportes of Lima in 1982 and won the Peruvian championship that same year. He participated with Universitario in the 1983 Copa Libertadores (five matches, one goal).

He finished his career in the late 1990s playing Lawn Tennis, winning the second division championship in 1997.

=== International career ===
Chávarry played only two matches for the Peruvian national team, in 1983, both against Paraguay.

== Managerial career ==
Chávarry won the Peruvian Second Division championship as coach of Olímpico Somos Perú in 2004.

== Honours ==
=== Player ===
Universitario de Deportes

- Torneo Descentralizado: 1982

Lawn Tennis

- Peruvian Segunda División: 1997

=== Manager ===
Olímpico Somos Perú

- Peruvian Segunda División: 2004
