= 1997 FBC Melgar season =

FBC Melgar
1997 season
- Stadium: Estadio Mariano Melgar
- Torneo Descentralizado: Torneo Descentralizado League: Nn (3°); Nn National (6°)
Home colours	Away colours	Third colours

The 1997 FBC Melgar season were the Eighty-Third (83.º) of the club from its foundation in 1915, Twenty-Eight (28) participations in the top-flight of Peruvian Primera División (of 81 Editions) with denomination Torneo Descentralizado. In Previous Season the club qualified as 11th Place of 1996 Torneo Descentralizado.

Melgar were a of forteen (14) clubs in the 'Thirty-Second edition (32.º) Torneo Descentralizado, the competition most important of the Peruvian football. The club played the Peruvian Primera División.

== Torneo Descentralizado ==
=== Torneo Apertura ===
Pos	Team	Pld	W	D	L	GF	GA	GD	Pts
8	Deportivo Pesquero	13	3	5	5	16	16	O	14
9	FBC Melgar	13	4	2	7	16	24	-8	14
10	Atlético Torino	13	2	7	4	14	19	-5	13

== See also ==
- FBC Melgar
- 1997 Torneo Descentralizado
