= Jaime Drago =

Peruvian footballer (born 1959)

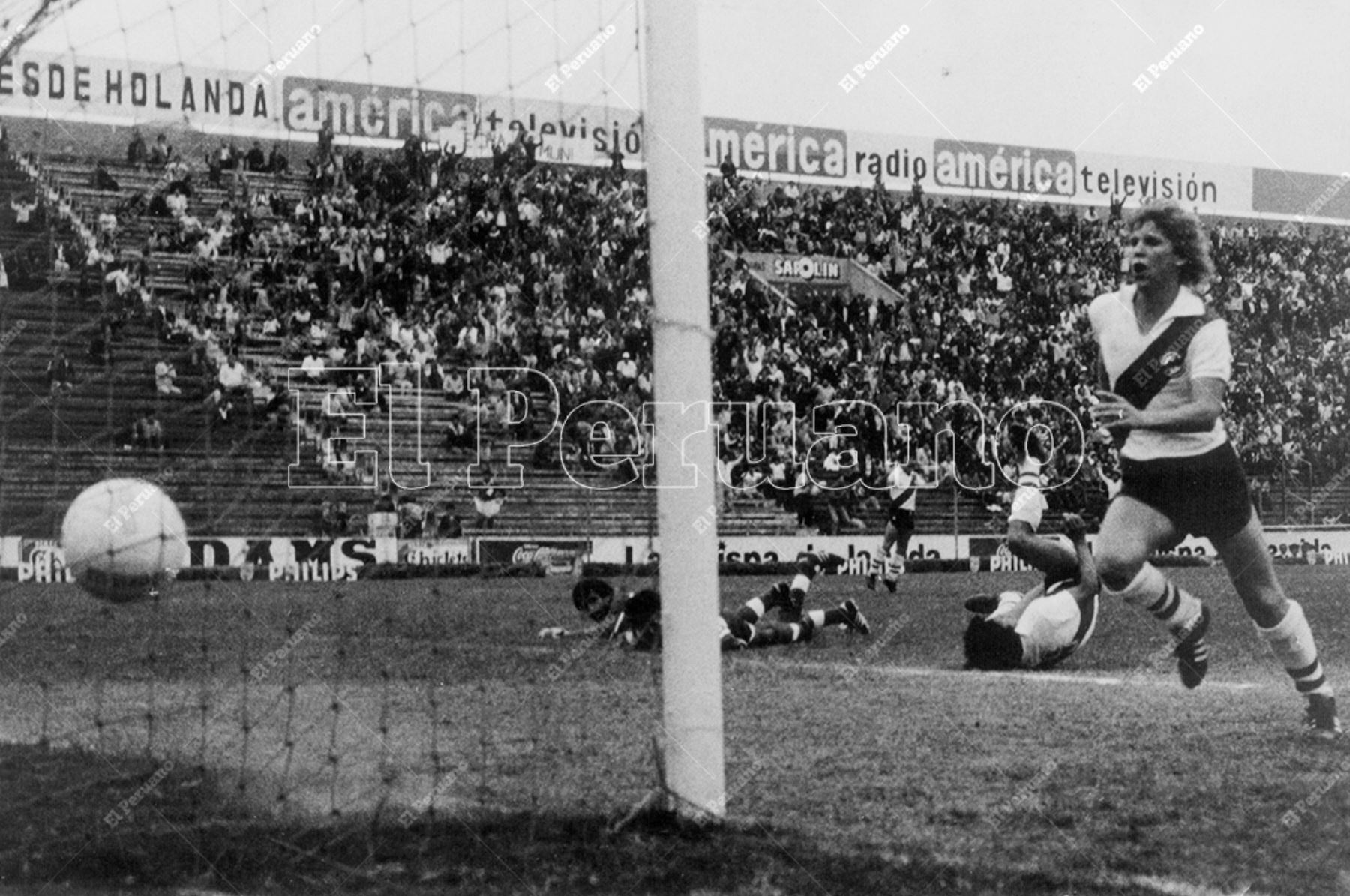
- Jaime Drago, player for Deportivo Municipal in 1980

Personal information
- Full name: Jaime Mario Drago Maturo
- Date of birth: 14 January 1959 (age 67)
- Place of birth: Lima, Peru
- Position: Midfielder

Youth career
- Lawn Tennis

Senior career*
Years	Team	Apps	(Gls)
1976–1982	Deportivo Municipal		
1983–1987	Universitario		
1987	SD Aucas		
1988	San Agustín		
1988–1989	Deportivo Italia		
1991	Sport Boys		
1992	Meteor-Lawn Tennis		

International career
1979	Peru	1	(0)
- * Club domestic league appearances and goals

Jaime Mario Drago Maturo (born on 14 January 1959) is a Peruvian professional footballer who played as midfielder.

His father and older brother, Roberto Drago and Titín Drago respectively, were also footballers.

== Playing career ==
=== Club career ===
Nicknamed Diablo (the devil), Jaime Drago began playing Lawn Tennis at the age of 13. However, he made his professional debut with Deportivo Municipal in 1976 at the age of 17. There, he was the Peruvian league runner-up in 1981 and played in the Copa Libertadores the following year (six matches and one goal).

In 1983, he joined Universitario de Deportes and became the joint top scorer in the 1984 league (tied with Francisco Montero) with 13 goals. He won two Peruvian league titles with Universitario in 1985 and 1987 and participated in two Copa Libertadores tournaments with the club, in 1985 and 1986 (10 matches played in total, scoring two goals).

Jaime Drago had the opportunity to play abroad, first in Ecuador with SD Aucas in 1987, then in Venezuela with Deportivo Italia between 1988 and 1989. Upon returning to Peru, he played successively for Deportivo San Agustín in 1990, Sport Boys in 1991, and ended his career with Meteor-Lawn Tennis in 1992.

=== International career ===
Jaime Drago only played one match with the Peruvian national team, in a friendly against Mexico on 1 November 1979 in Monterrey (1–0 defeat).

== Honours ==
Universitario de Deportes

- Torneo Descentralizado (2): 1985, 1987
- Torneo Descentralizado Top scorer: 1984 (13 goals)
