= 1997 Sporting Cristal season =

Sporting Cristal
1997 season
- Stadium: San Martín de Porres, Lima
- Torneo Descentralizado: Torneo Apertura: Second (2°); Torneo Clausura: Third (3°); Aggregate Table: Third (3°); Liguilla Pre-Libertadores: First (1°); Runner-up National (2°)
Home colours	Away colours	Third colours

The 1997 Sporting Cristal season were the Forty-Second (42.º) of the club from its foundation in 1955, Forty-Two (42) participations consecutives in the top-flight of Peruvian Primera División (of 81 Editions) with denomination Torneo Descentralizado. In Previous Season the club qualified as Champions National 1st Place of the 1996 Torneo Descentralizado.

Sporting Cristal were a of fourteen (14) clubs in the Thirty-Second edition (32.º) Torneo Descentralizado, the competition most important of the Peruvian football. The club played the Peruvian Primera División and Copa Libertadores for Seventeenth (17th) Time.

== Torneo Descentralizado ==
=== Torneo Apertura ===
Pos	Team	Pld	W	D	L	GF	GA	GD	Pts
1	Alianza Lima	13	9	3	1	27	9	+18	30
2	Sporting Cristal	13	8	3	2	30	13	+17	27
3	Universitario	13	7	4	2	19	8	+11	25

== See also ==
- Club Sporting Cristal
- 1997 Torneo Descentralizado
