= Kolchin =

Kolchin (Russian: Колчин) is a Russian masculine surname originating from the given name Nikolai (Nicholas); its feminine counterpart is Kolchina. The surname may refer to the following notable people:

- Alevtina Kolchina (1930–2022), Soviet cross-country skier
- Denys Kolchin (born 1977), Ukrainian football defender and manager
- Ellis Kolchin (1916–1991), American mathematician
  - Lie–Kolchin theorem
  - Kolchin topology
- Fjodor Koltšin (1957–2018), Estonian cross-country skier, son of Alevtina and Pavel
- Nataliya Kolchina (born 1939), Soviet long track speed skater
- Pavel Kolchin (1930–2010), Soviet cross-country skier, husband of Alevtina
- Peter Kolchin (1943–2025), American historian
- Yuri Kolchin (born 1976), Russian football player
