= 1997 Copa Perú =

Copa Perú
- Season: 1997
- Champions: Juan Aurich

The 1997 Copa Perú season (Spanish: Copa Perú 1997), the promotion tournament of Peruvian football.

In this tournament after many qualification rounds, each one of the 24 departments in which Peru is politically divided, qualify a team. Those teams plus the team relegated from First Division are divided in 6 groups by geographical proximity and each group winner goes to the Final round, staged in Lima (the capital).

The champion was promoted to 1998 Torneo Descentralizado.

== Departmental Stage ==
The following list shows the teams that qualified for the Regional Stage.

Department	Team	Location
Amazonas	Sachapuyos	Amazonas
Ancash	Unión Florida	Chimbote
Apurímac	Los Chankas	Andahuaylas
Arequipa	Mariscal Castilla	Arequipa
Ayacucho	Deportivo DASA	Ayacucho
Cajamarca	UTC	Cajamarca
Callao	Olímpico Bella Unión	Callao
Cusco	Juventud Progreso	Cusco
Huancavelica	UNH	Huancavelica
Huánuco	Unión Naranjillo	Tingo María
Ica	Estudiantes de Medicina	Ica
Junín	Cultural Hidro	Junín
La Libertad	Deportivo UPAO	Trujillo

Department	Team	Location
Lambayeque	Juan Aurich	Chiclayo
Lima	San José de Manzanares	Huacho
Loreto	CNI	Iquitos
Madre de Dios	30 de Agosto	Puerto Maldonado
Moquegua	Atlético Huracán	Moquegua
Pasco	Sport Sausa	Pasco
Piura	Atlético Grau	Piura
Puno	Deportivo Universitario	Puno
San Martín	Power Maíz	San Martín
Tacna	Coronel Bolognesi	Tacna
Tumbes	Independiente Aguas Verdes	Tumbes
Ucayali	San Martín de Porres	Pucallpa

== Regional Stage ==
=== Region I ===
Region I includes qualified teams from Cajamarca, Lambayeque, Tumbes and Piura region.

Pos	Team	Pld	W	D	L	GF	GA	GD	Pts	Qualification	AUR	UTC	IND	GRA
1	Juan Aurich	0	0	0	0	0	0	0	0	Final Stage				
2	UTC	0	0	0	0	0	0	0	0					
3	Independiente Aguas Verdes	0	0	0	0	0	0	0	0					
4	Atlético Grau	0	0	0	0	0	0	0	0					

Legend: Blue = home team win; Yellow = draw; Red = away team win.

=== Region II ===
Region II includes qualified teams from Ancash, Callao, Ica and Lima region.

Pos	Team	Pld	W	D	L	GF	GA	GD	Pts	Qualification	UPA	EST	FLO	SJO	OLI
1	Deportivo UPAO	0	0	0	0	0	0	0	0	Final Stage					
2	Estudiantes de Medicina	0	0	0	0	0	0	0	0						
3	Unión Florida	0	0	0	0	0	0	0	0						
4	San José de Manzanares	0	0	0	0	0	0	0	0						
5	Olímpico Bella Unión	0	0	0	0	0	0	0	0						

Legend: Blue = home team win; Yellow = draw; Red = away team win.

=== Region III ===
Region III includes qualified teams from Amazonas, Loreto, San Martín and Ucayali region.

Pos	Team	Pld	W	D	L	GF	GA	GD	Pts	Qualification	CNI	SAC	MAI	SMP
1	CNI	0	0	0	0	0	0	0	0	Final Stage				
2	Sachapuyos	0	0	0	0	0	0	0	0					
3	El Maíz	0	0	0	0	0	0	0	0					
4	San Martín de Porres	0	0	0	0	0	0	0	0					

Legend: Blue = home team win; Yellow = draw; Red = away team win.

=== Region IV ===
Region IV includes qualified teams from Huancavelica, Huánuco, Junín and Pasco region.

Pos	Team	Pld	W	D	L	GF	GA	GD	Pts	Qualification	HID	UNH	NAR	SAU
1	Cultural Hidro	0	0	0	0	0	0	0	0	Final Stage				
2	UNH	0	0	0	0	0	0	0	0					
3	Unión Naranjillo	0	0	0	0	0	0	0	0					
4	Sport Sausa	0	0	0	0	0	0	0	0					

Legend: Blue = home team win; Yellow = draw; Red = away team win.

=== Region V ===
Region V includes qualified teams from Apurímac, Ayacucho, Cusco and Madre de Dios region.

Pos	Team	Pld	W	D	L	GF	GA	GD	Pts	Qualification	CHA	PRO	DAS	30A
1	Los Chankas	0	0	0	0	0	0	0	0	Final Stage				
2	Juventud Progreso	0	0	0	0	0	0	0	0					
3	Deportivo DASA	0	0	0	0	0	0	0	0					
4	30 de Agosto	0	0	0	0	0	0	0	0					

Legend: Blue = home team win; Yellow = draw; Red = away team win.

=== Region VI ===
Region Vi includes qualified teams from Arequipa, Moquegua, Puno and Tacna region.

Pos	Team	Pld	W	D	L	GF	GA	GD	Pts	Qualification	UNI	CAS	HUR	BOL
1	Deportivo Universitario	0	0	0	0	0	0	0	0	Final Stage				
2	Mariscal Castilla	0	0	0	0	0	0	0	0					
3	Atlético Huracán	0	0	0	0	0	0	0	0					
4	Coronel Bolognesi	0	0	0	0	0	0	0	0					

Legend: Blue = home team win; Yellow = draw; Red = away team win.

== Final Stage ==
=== Standings ===
Pos	Team	Pld	W	D	L	GF	GA	GD	Pts	Promotion
1	Juan Aurich (C)	5	4	0	1	13	2	+11	12	Promoted to 1998 Torneo Descentralizado
2	Deportivo UPAO	5	4	0	1	14	4	+10	12	
3	Cultural Hidro	5	2	1	2	7	8	−1	7	
4	Deportivo Universitario	5	2	0	3	5	8	−3	6	
5	Los Chankas	5	1	2	2	2	5	−3	5	
6	CNI	5	0	1	4	5	19	−14	1	

(C) Champions

=== Results ===
==== Round 1 ====
30 November 1997	Juan Aurich	7–0	CNI	Nacional, Lima
	Valderrama 21'; Mujica 23' 49'; La Rosa 40'; Torres 65'; Chávez 75'; Guerrero 85'			Referee: Ángel Ziani

30 November 1997	Cultural Hidro	1–0	Deportivo Universitario	Nacional, Lima
	Villarroel 14'			Attendance: 13,612; Referee: Jorge Torres

30 November 1997	Los Chankas	1–0	Deportivo UPAO	Nacional, Lima
	Pequeño 54'			Referee: Víctor Mayorga

==== Round 2 ====
3 December 1997	Los Chankas	1–1	CNI	Nacional, Lima

3 December 1997	Deportivo UPAO	5–2	Cultural Hidro	Nacional, Lima

3 December 1997	Juan Aurich	3–1	Deportivo Universitario	Nacional, Lima

==== Round 3 ====
7 December 1997	Deportivo Universitario	2–1	CNI	Nacional, Lima

7 December 1997	Cultural Hidro	0–0	Los Chankas	Nacional, Lima

7 December 1997	Deportivo UPAO	1–0	Juan Aurich	Nacional, Lima

==== Round 4 ====
10 December 1997	Deportivo UPAO	5–1	CNI	Nacional, Lima

10 December 1997	Deportivo Universitario	2–0	Los Chankas	Nacional, Lima

10 December 1997	Juan Aurich	1–0	Cultural Hidro	Nacional, Lima

==== Round 5 ====
14 December 1997	Cultural Hidro	4–2	CNI	Nacional, Lima
	Quintana 14' 40' 74'; Ortiz 49'		Soto 60'; Urrelo 66'	Referee: Gustavo Zavaleta

14 December 1997	Juan Aurich	2–0	Los Chankas	Nacional, Lima
	Pósito 34'; Torres 85'			Referee: Víctor Mayorga

14 December 1997	Deportivo UPAO	3–0	Deportivo Universitario	Nacional, Lima
	Besada 3'; Aguilar 21'; Lara 49'			Attendance: 7,075; Referee: Alberto Tejada

==== Tiebreaker ====
17 December 1997	Juan Aurich	1–0	Deportivo UPAO	Nacional, Lima

== See also ==
- 1997 Torneo Descentralizado
- 1997 Peruvian Segunda División
