= Jesús Purizaga =

Peruvian footballer (born 1959)

Personal information
- Full name: Jesús Manuel Purizaga Sánchez
- Date of birth: 24 December 1959 (age 66)
- Place of birth: Lima, Peru
- Position: Goalkeeper

Senior career*
| Years | Team | Apps | (Gls) |
| 1981–1985 | UT Cajamarca | | |
| 1986–1989 | Sporting Cristal | | |
| 1990–1991 | Alianza Lima | | |
| 1992 | UT Cajamarca | 26 | (0) |
| 1993–1994 | Deportivo Municipal | | |
| 1995 | Aurich–Cañaña | 2 | (0) |
| 1996–1997 | Deportivo Pesquero | 11 | (0) |
| 1998 | Lawn Tennis | 29 | (0) |
| 1999 | Alianza Lima | | |

International career
| 1988–1991 | Peru | 22 | (0) |
- * Club domestic league appearances and goals

Jesús Manuel Purizaga Sánchez (born 24 December 1959) is a retired Peruvian international footballer.

== Playing career ==
=== Club ===
Born in Lima, Peru, Purizaga played for UT Cajamarca and for Lima giants Sporting Cristal and Alianza Lima.

=== International ===
Purizaga made 22 appearances for the Peru national football team from 1988 to 1991. He participated in the 1991 Copa América.
