= 1999 Torneo Descentralizado =

Torneo Descentralizado
- Season: 1999
- Dates: 6 February 1999 – 20 December 1999
- Champions: Universitario; 23rd Primera División title
- Runner up: Alianza Lima
- Relegated: I.M.I.
- Copa Libertadores: Universitario; Alianza Lima; Sporting Cristal
- Copa Merconorte: Alianza Lima; Sporting Cristal; Universitario
- Top goalscorer: Ysrael Zúñiga (32 goals)

The 1999 season of the Torneo Descentralizado was the 84th season of the top category of Peruvian football (soccer). It was played by 12 teams. The national champion was Universitario.

The national championship was divided into two half-year tournaments, the Torneo Apertura and the Torneo Clausura. Each was played on a home-and-away round-robin basis. The winners of each would play for the national title in a playoff. If the same club had won both tournaments, it would have won the national championship automatically.

Following-season Copa Libertadores berths went to the champion, as well as to the best other team in the aggregate table. The bottom team on the aggregate table was relegated, while the eleventh place held a promotion play-off against the winner of the Segunda División (Second Division).

== Teams ==
=== Team changes ===
Promoted from 1998 Copa Perú	Relegated from 1998 Primera División
▲ I.M.I. (1st)	▼ Lawn Tennis (12th)

=== Stadia locations ===
Locations of the 1999 Primera División teams

Team	City	Stadium	Capacity
Alianza Atlético	Sullana	Campeones del 36	8,000
Alianza Lima	Lima	Alejandro Villanueva	35,000
Cienciano	Cuzco	Garcilaso	42,056
Deportivo Municipal	Lima	Nacional	45,750
Deportivo Pesquero	Chimbote	Manuel Rivera Sanchez	25,000
I.M.I.	Talara	Campeonísimo	8,000
Juan Aurich	Chiclayo	Elías Aguirre	24,500
Melgar	Arequipa	Mariano Melgar	20,000
Sport Boys	Callao	Miguel Grau	15,000
Sporting Cristal	Lima	San Martín de Porres	18,000
Unión Minas	Cerro de Pasco	Daniel Alcides Carrión	8,000
Universitario	Lima	Teodoro Lolo Fernández	15,000

== Torneo Apertura ==
=== Standings ===
Pos	Team	Pld	W	D	L	GF	GA	GD	Pts	Qualification
1	Universitario	22	15	5	2	35	15	+20	50	Copa Libertadores 2000 First stage
2	Alianza Lima	22	14	4	4	51	20	+31	46	
3	Sporting Cristal	22	11	8	3	50	23	+27	41	
4	Cienciano	22	10	5	7	32	25	+7	35	
5	Melgar	22	9	6	7	35	27	+8	33	
6	Sport Boys	22	7	9	6	29	30	−1	30	
7	Unión Minas	22	6	7	9	29	29	0	25	
8	Alianza Atlético	22	6	7	9	25	38	−13	25	
9	Deportivo Municipal	22	5	6	11	22	36	−14	21	
10	I.M.I.	22	5	4	13	22	55	−33	19	
11	Juan Aurich	22	4	6	12	21	38	−17	18	
12	Deportivo Pesquero	22	2	9	11	18	43	−25	15	

Updated to match(es) played on July 1999. Source: https://www.rsssf.org/tablesp/peru99.html
Rules for classification: 1) points; 2) goal difference; 3) number of goals scored.

=== Results ===
Home \ Away	AAS	ALI	CIE	MUN	PES	IMI	MEL	JA	SBA	CRI	MIN	UNI
Alianza Atlético		2–1	4–2	1–1	2–1	6–0	1–1	5–1	2–2	0–0	2–2	0–2
Alianza Lima	2–0		2–1	3–0	7–0	5–0	5–0	3–1	1–0	3–2	4–1	0–1
Cienciano	1–0	2–1		2–0	3–0	2–1	0–0	4–0	2–0	2–0	1–1	0–0
Deportivo Municipal	1–1	1–1	0–1		1–2	3–2	3–2	2–0	1–1	1–4	1–1	2–3
Deportivo Pesquero	2–2	0–0	3–3	0–1		0–1	0–2	2–2	1–1	1–1	2–0	1–1
I.M.I.	0–2	2–4	4–1	2–0	2–2		1–1	2–1	1–2	1–1	1–0	0–3
Melgar	3–1	1–2	2–0	1–1	3–0	4–0		2–0	4–0	1–3	2–1	3–2
Juan Aurich	2–0	1–1	2–1	1–3	3–0	1–1	0–0		1–0	1–2	2–2	0–0
Sport Boys	4–2	0–1	2–1	2–0	0–0	4–0	3–2	2–1		3–3	1–1	0–0
Sporting Cristal	4–1	2–2	1–1	2–0	5–0	6–1	3–1	3–0	1–1		4–1	1–1
Unión Minas	4–0	1–2	0–1	3–0	2–1	4–0	0–0	1–0	1–1	1–0		1–2
Universitario	2–1	2–1	2–1	1–0	1–0	3–0	1–0	2–1	4–0	0–2	2–1	

Updated to match(es) played on 1999. Source: RSSSF Peru 1999
Legend: Blue = home team win; Yellow = draw; Red = away team win.

== Torneo Clausura ==
=== Standings ===
Pos	Team	Pld	W	D	L	GF	GA	GD	Pts	Qualification
1	Alianza Lima	22	14	5	3	47	18	+29	47	Copa Libertadores 2000 First stage
2	Universitario	22	12	6	4	44	24	+20	42	
3	Sport Boys	22	11	6	5	32	25	+7	39	
4	Sporting Cristal	22	11	5	6	46	31	+15	38	
5	Melgar	22	11	3	8	44	30	+14	36	
6	Unión Minas	22	7	7	8	43	39	+4	28	
7	Alianza Atlético	22	7	6	9	36	28	+8	27	
8	Cienciano	22	7	9	6	27	27	0	27 (Note: Cienciano lost 3 points in Round 13 win over Sporting Cristal for fielding an ineligible player.)	
9	Juan Aurich	22	8	3	11	26	32	−6	27	
10	Deportivo Pesquero	22	4	8	10	17	38	−21	20	
11	Deportivo Municipal	22	5	3	14	20	54	−34	18	
12	I.M.I.	22	1	7	14	12	52	−40	10	

Updated to match(es) played on December 1999. Source: https://www.rsssf.org/tablesp/peru99.html
Rules for classification: 1) points; 2) goal difference; 3) number of goals scored.

=== Results ===
Home \ Away	AAS	ALI	CIE	MUN	PES	IMI	MEL	JA	SBA	CRI	MIN	UNI
Alianza Atlético		1–2	2–0	5–0	4–0	7–0	1–0	2–0	1–1	1–3	1–1	2–5
Alianza Lima	1–0		2–1	4–0	1–0	4–0	1–0	2–1	1–1	2–1	7–1	0–0
Cienciano	0–0	2–1		2–0	0–0	3–0	2–1	3–0	1–1	2–0	2–2	2–2
Deportivo Municipal	2–1	1–6	2–1		1–1	2–0	2–3	0–1	1–2	1–3	3–2	0–1
Deportivo Pesquero	0–0	0–4	1–1	0–1		3–2	2–0	0–2	1–1	1–1	1–0	2–2
I.M.I.	0–2	1–1	0–0	0–0	1–1		2–2	0–1	0–0	0–2	4–3	0–0
Melgar	2–0	2–1	2–0	4–2	5–2	2–0		4–0	2–0	1–1	5–1	2–0
Juan Aurich	3–1	0–1	3–0	1–1	0–1	3–1	3–0		5–2	1–1	1–1	0–1
Sport Boys	1–1	2–1	2–1	3–1	1–0	2–0	2–0	2–0		2–1	4–0	1–0
Sporting Cristal	3–2	2–2	1–3	6–0	2–1	4–0	3–2	2–1	2–1		5–1	2–2
Unión Minas	2–2	0–0	1–1	7–0	4–0	4–0	1–1	3–0	3–0	3–0		3–0
Universitario	2–0	2–3	2–2	1–0	5–0	6–1	4–2	2–0	3–1	2–1	2–0	

Updated to match(es) played on 1999. Source: RSSSF Peru 1999
Legend: Blue = home team win; Yellow = draw; Red = away team win.

== Title Play-off ==
15 December 1999
20:30
First leg

Universitario	3–0	Alianza Lima
Roberto Farfán 10'; Eduardo Esidio 49'; José del Solar 74'

Estadio Nacional, Lima
Attendance: 31,159
Referee: José Arana
20 December 1999
15:30
Second leg

Alianza Lima	1–0	Universitario
Víctor Mafla 45'

Estadio Alejandro Villanueva, Lima
Attendance: 23,203
Referee: Víctor Mayorga

== Aggregate table ==
Pos	Team	Pld	W	D	L	GF	GA	GD	Pts	Qualification or relegation
1	Alianza Lima	44	28	9	7	98	38	+60	93	2000 Copa Libertadores and 2000 Copa Merconorte
2	Universitario (C)	44	27	11	6	79	39	+40	92	2000 Copa Libertadores and 2000 Copa Merconorte
3	Sporting Cristal	44	22	13	9	96	54	+42	79	2000 Copa Libertadores and 2000 Copa Merconorte
4	Melgar	44	20	9	15	79	57	+22	69	
5	Sport Boys	44	18	15	11	61	55	+6	69	
6	Cienciano	44	17	14	13	59	52	+7	65	
7	Unión Minas	44	13	14	17	72	68	+4	53	
8	Alianza Atlético	44	13	13	18	71	66	+5	52	
9	Juan Aurich	44	12	9	23	47	70	−23	45	
10	Deportivo Municipal	44	10	9	25	42	90	−48	39	
11	Deportivo Pesquero (O)	44	6	17	21	35	81	−46	35	Qualification for Promotion/relegation play-off
12	I.M.I. (R)	44	6	11	27	34	107	−73	29	Relegation to 2000 Copa Perú

Updated to match(es) played on December 1999. Source:
Rules for classification: 1) points; 2) goal difference; 3) number of goals scored.
(C) Champions; (O) Play-off winners; (R) Relegated

== Promotion/relegation play-off ==
The promotion/relegation play-off was a two-legged series played by the team placing 11th in the 1999 Primera División, Deportivo Pesquero and the 1999 Segunda División champion América Cochahuayco.

19 December 1999
11:30

Deportivo Pesquero	2–2	América Cochahuayco
José Espinoza 60'; Carlos Silvera 61'		Oswaldo Carrión 45'; Carlos Ibarra 72'
Penalties
Luis Molina (penalty scored); José Espinoza (penalty scored); Wilmer Ricardi (penalty missed); Juan Manuel Olivares (penalty scored); Carlos Silvera (penalty scored)	4–3	Juan Iriarte (penalty missed); Giancarlo Sarnia (penalty scored); Roberto Valenzuela (penalty scored); José Laurie (penalty missed); John Galliquio (penalty scored)

Estadio Nacional, Lima
Attendance: 3,472
Referee: Jorge Torres
- Deportivo Pesquero remained in Primera División.

== Top scorers ==
32 goals

- Ysrael Zúñiga (FBC Melgar)

24 goals

- Harry Castillo (Unión Minas)

22 goals

- Waldir Sáenz (Alianza Lima)

19 goals

- Roberto Holsen (Alianza Atlético, Sporting Cristal)
- Claudio Pizarro (Alianza Lima)

== See also ==
- 1999 Peruvian Segunda División
- 1999 Copa Perú
