= Roberto Drago =

Peruvian footballer (1923–2014)

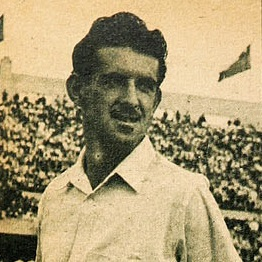

Personal information
- Full name: Roberto Drago Burga
- Date of birth: 28 July 1923
- Place of birth: Lima, Peru
- Date of death: 24 October 2014 (aged 91)
- Place of death: Lima, Peru
- Position: Forward

Senior career*
Years	Team	Apps	(Gls)
1939	Centro Iqueño		
1940–1945	Deportivo Municipal		
1946	Racing Club	3	(0)
1947–1951	Deportivo Municipal		
1952	Independiente Medellín		
1953–1961	Deportivo Municipal		
1962–1963	Ciclista Lima		
1963–1965	Deportivo Municipal		

International career
1949–1961	Peru	30	(7)

Managerial career
- 1962–1963: Ciclista Lima
- 1965: Deportivo Municipal
- 1966: Sport Boys
- 1967: Deportivo Municipal
- 1968: Peru olympic
- 1969–1972: Deportivo Municipal
- 1977: Atlético Chalaco
- 1978–1979: Atlético Chalaco
- 1979: Deportivo Municipal
- * Club domestic league appearances and goals

Roberto "Tito" Drago Burga (28 July 1923 – 24 October 2014) was a Peruvian professional footballer who played as forward.

He is considered the most important player in the history of Deportivo Municipal from Lima.

== Playing career ==
=== Club ===
After playing for the Centro Iqueño, Roberto Drago joined Deportivo Municipal in 1940 and made his debut on May 12, 1940 against Atlético Chalaco (2-0 victory).

Emblematic player of Deportivo Municipal, he played around twenty seasons intermittently between 1940 and 1965. He won the championships in 1940, 1943 and 1950 with the help of two of their partners, Luis Guzmán and Máximo Mosquera, trio known in Peru as “The Three Little Cats”.

Transferred to Racing Club de Avellaneda in 1947 for 6,500 pesos (and a salary of 400 pesos per month), Drago played under the management of Guillermo Stábile but failed to establish himself (only 3 matches played) and returned to Peru. He would have one last experience abroad in 1952, in Colombia, with Independiente Medellín.

=== International ===
Peruvian international, author of seven goals in 30 caps, Roberto Drago participated in the South American championships of 1949, 1953, 1955 and 1956 as well as in two editions of the Panamerican Championship in 1952 and 1956. He won the gold medal with his country at the 1948 Bolivarian Games.

== Coaching career ==
After his playing career, Roberto Drago worked as a coach. He managed Sport Boys in 1966, which he qualified for the Copa Libertadores for the first time. Between 1967 and 1979, he managed his long-time club, Deportivo Municipal, three times.

== Personal live ==
Roberto Drago has three sons, Roberto alias Titín, Miguel and Jaime, all three footballers for Deportivo Municipal. In 1981, he founded a football academy, the Academia Tito Drago. He died on October 24, 2014, at the age of 91.

== Statistics ==
Appearances and goals by national team and year
National team	Year	Apps	Goals
Peru	1949	5	3
Peru	1952	5	1
Peru	1953	8	0
Peru	1954	1	0
Peru	1955	2	0
Peru	1956	8	3
Peru	1961	1	0
Total		30	7

List of international goals scored by Roberto Drago
No.	Date	Venue	Opponent	Score	Result	Competition
1.	13 April 1949	São Januário, Rio de Janeiro, Brazil	Paraguay	1–3	1–3	1949 South American Championship
2.	27 April 1949	Vila Belmiro, Rio de Janeiro, Brazil	Bolivia	1–0	3–0	1949 South American Championship
3.	27 April 1949	Vila Belmiro, Rio de Janeiro, Brazil	Bolivia	2–0	3–0	1949 South American Championship
4.	20 April 1952	Estadio Nacional, Santiago, Chile	Mexico	2–0	3–0	1952 Panamerican Championship
5.	22 January 1956	Estadio Centenario, Montevideo, Uruguay	Argentina	1–2	1–2	1956 South American Championship
6.	1 February 1956	Estadio Centenario, Montevideo, Uruguay	Brazil	1–1	1–2	1956 South American Championship
7.	4 March 1956	Estadio Olímpico Universitario, Mexico City, Mexico	Mexico	1–0	2–0	1956 Panamerican Championship

== Honours ==
=== Player ===
Deportivo Municipal

- Peruvian Primera División: 1940, 1943, 1950
