= Sunny Nwachukwu =

Nigerian footballer

Personal information
- Date of birth: 15 January 1976
- Place of birth: Maiduguri, Nigeria
- Position: Forward

Senior career*
Years	Team	Apps	(Gls)
1993–1994	KRC Genk	10	(0)
1994–1995	Germinal Ekeren	1	(0)
1995–1997	KFC Tielen		
1997–19xx	Germinal Ekeren		
19xx–1998	KFC Lille		
1998–1999	KSK Beveren	11	(0)
2000–2002	Montreal Impact	25	(1)

Managerial career
- RC Hades (U15)
- * Club domestic league appearances and goals

Sunny Nwachukwu (born 15 January 1976 in Nigeria) is a Nigerian retired professional footballer who is last known to have trained with HSV Hoek in the Netherlands in 2003.

== Career ==
=== Belgium ===
Earning minimum wage without inking a contract with Genk, Ekeren, and Tielen, Nwachukwu turned out for KSK Beveren in the preseason of 1998–99, bagging a brace in a friendly with Nieuwkerken-Waas which ended 3–1, before going on to appear in 6 league and cup games for Beveren and departing in 1999.

=== Canada ===
Starting for the first time with Montreal Impact when they hosted the Vancouver 86ers in 2000, the Nigerian was regarded as a palpable threat in the league for the Impact and had his contract extended in 2001 despite suffering an injury the previous season.

=== England ===
Impressed at Dagenham & Redbridge with two friendly goals in 2002.
