= Lewis Coady =

English footballer

Personal information
- Full name: Lewis Coady
- Date of birth: 20 September 1976 (age 50)
- Place of birth: Liverpool, England
- Position: Midfielder

Youth career
- Wrexham

Senior career*
Years	Team	Apps	(Gls)
1995	Wrexham	2	(0)
1995–1997	Colwyn Bay		
1997	Doncaster Rovers	1	(0)
1997	Colwyn Bay		
1997	Porthmadog	5	(3)
1998	Caernarfon Town	3	(0)
1998	Porthmadog	1	(0)
1999–2001	Bangor City	34	(4)
- * Club domestic league appearances and goals

Lewis Coady (born 20 September 1976) is an English former professional footballer who played as a midfielder. He made appearances in the English Football League with Wrexham and Doncaster Rovers, however spent most of his career playing in the Welsh Premier League.
