= Roman Baranov (ice hockey) =

Russian ice hockey player

- Born: June 25, 1973 (age 51); Kazan, Russian SFSR, Soviet Union
- Height: 5 ft 11 in (180 cm)
- Weight: 187 lb (85 kg; 13 st 5 lb)
- Position: Right wing
- Shot: Left
- Played for: Itil Kazan; Neftyanik Almetievsk; TAN Kazan; Ak Bars Kazan; HC Neftekhimik Nizhnekamsk; Neftyanik Leninogorsk; Ariada Volzhsk
- Playing career: 1990–2009

Roman Baranov (born June 25, 1973) is a Soviet and Russian former professional ice hockey forward. He is a one-time Russian Champion.

== Career statistics ==
			Regular season					Playoffs
Season	Team	League	GP	G	A	Pts	PIM	GP	G	A	Pts	PIM
1990–91	Itil Kazan	Soviet	—	—	—	—	—	—	—	—	—	—
1990–91	Neftyanik Almetyevsk	Soviet3	63	23	6	29	22	—	—	—	—	—
1991–92	Itil Kazan	Soviet	19	4	0	4	6	—	—	—	—	—
1991–92	Neftyanik Almetyevsk	Soviet3	2	1	0	1	2	—	—	—	—	—
1992–93	Itil Kazan	Russia	39	9	3	12	20	—	—	—	—	—
1992–93	TAN Kazan	Russia2	1	0	0	0	0	—	—	—	—	—
1993–94	Itil Kazan	Russia	45	8	6	14	16	4	0	0	0	2
1994–95	Itil Kazan	Russia	44	17	15	32	30	2	1	1	2	2
1994–95	Itil Kazan-2	Russia2	2	2	0	2	6	—	—	—	—	—
1995–96	Ak Bars Kazan	Russia	44	16	9	25	55	5	3	2	5	2
1995–96	Ak Bars Kazan-2	Russia2	1	0	0	0	0	—	—	—	—	—
1996–97	Ak Bars Kazan	Russia	43	6	10	16	24	3	0	0	0	0
1997–98	Ak Bars Kazan	Russia	42	7	8	15	14	6	0	0	0	2
1998–99	Ak Bars Kazan	Russia	18	5	2	7	0	13	1	2	3	4
1998–99	Ak Bars Kazan-2	Russia3	6	7	6	13	6	—	—	—	—	—
1999–00	HC Neftekhimik Nizhnekamsk	Russia	37	10	10	20	28	4	1	2	3	0
2000–01	HC Neftekhimik Nizhnekamsk	Russia	42	7	9	16	28	—	—	—	—	—
2001–02	HC Neftekhimik Nizhnekamsk	Russia	48	8	11	19	12	—	—	—	—	—
2002–03	HC Neftekhimik Nizhnekamsk	Russia	19	1	0	1	10	—	—	—	—	—
2002–03	HC Neftekhimik Nizhnekamsk-2	Russia3	8	6	4	10	12	—	—	—	—	—
2003–04	Neftyanik Almetyevsk	Russia2	54	15	14	29	54	7	0	2	2	10
2004–05	Neftyanik Almetyevsk	Russia2	50	16	19	35	42	4	0	0	0	0
2005–06	Neftyanik Almetyevsk	Russia2	47	13	23	36	62	6	3	0	3	10
2006–07	Neftyanik Almetyevsk	Russia2	47	10	27	37	48	4	0	2	2	4
2007–08	Neftyanik Almetyevsk	Russia2	17	5	4	9	48	—	—	—	—	—
2007–08	Ariada-Akpars Volzhsk	Russia2	38	11	26	37	52	—	—	—	—	—
2007–08	Ariada-Akpars Volzhsk-2	Russia3	4	0	5	5	6	—	—	—	—	—
2008–09	Ariada-Akpars Volzhsk	Russia2	57	11	19	30	66	4	0	2	2	8
Russia totals			421	94	83	177	237	37	6	7	13	12
Russia2 totals			314	83	132	215	378	25	3	6	9	32

== Awards and honors ==
Award	Year
RSL
Winner (Ak Bars Kazan)	1998
