= Lawn Tennis FC =

Lawn Tennis
- Full name: Lawn Tennis Futbol Club
- Founded: 1997
- Ground: Estadio Nacional, Lima
- Capacity: 45,000
- League: Ligas Distritales del Peru
Home colours	Away colours

Lawn Tennis is a Peruvian sports club, playing in the city of Lima, Peru.

== History ==
Lawn Tennis was founded on June 27, 1884, by a group of English immigrants, and had Juan P. Gallagher Gibbs as their first chairman. Its original headquarters were in the Parque de la Exposición, but it later moved to the Jesús María district in the early 20th century. The club is the usual ground for the Peru Davis Cup team's matches. The club's main sports are Tennis, along with swimming, volleyball, badminton, squash and Paleta Frontón.

== Football ==
Lawn Tennis' footballing section was active in the early days of Peruvian football, but it only entered official competitions for the first time in 1927, when it won the División Intermedia, attaining promotion to the 1928 Primera División. The team was relegated in that championship, but won the División Intermedia in the following year again; after two years in the first level, Lawn Tennis broke away from the Peruvian Football Federation.

The team returned to football in 1983, playing in the Segunda División, where it finished in last; the team returned to the Segunda División in 1986, and continued disputing that championship until it was relegated in 1991; However, after the relegation, Meteor merged with it, allowing it to continue participating in the Segunda División; the fusion stood until 1994, when Meteor broke away, and at the same time, Lawn Tennis' football section also split from the main club. The club was champion of the 1997 Segunda División Peruana, attaining promotion to the Torneo Descentralizado, where it remained for only one season before being relegated.

The team eventually was relegated from the Segunda División in 2002, returning to the Jesús María district league, where it has remained ever since.

== Achievements ==
- Segunda Division Peruana: 1

1997

== Notable players ==
- (Peru) Germán Leguía (1974–75)
- (Peru) Titín Drago (1983)
- (Peru) Rodolfo Chávarry (1990–98)
- (Peru) Jaime Drago (1992)
- (Peru) Juan Luna (1997–99)
- (Peru) Abel Lobatón (1997–98)
- (Peru) Jesús Purizaga (1998)
- (Peru) Martín Duffó (1998)

== See also ==
- List of football clubs in Peru
- Peruvian football league system
