= Emad Bouanane =

French footballer (born 1976)

Personal information
- Date of birth: November 22, 1976 (age 49)
- Place of birth: Paris, France
- Position: Left back

Senior career*
Years	Team	Apps	(Gls)
- US Avranches
	Wrexham	13	(0)
- SC Abbeville
- * Club domestic league appearances and goals

Emad Bouanane (born 22 November 1976, Paris) is a French footballer. Originally signed by manager Brian Flynn to play as a left back from US Avranches for Wrexham Football Club, Emad Bouanane quickly became a favourite amongst the Wrexham supporters.

== After leaving Wrexham ==
Having been released from the Red Dragons in the summer of 2001 due to financial problems, Emad went on to have a failed trial at another football league side, Swindon Town F.C. He spent a year living in Birmingham before signing for fifth-tier French club SC Abbeville. He scored on his début in a 2–0 victory against AC Cambrai.

Team	Games	Goals
Wrexham	13 (4)	0
