= Denis Koretskiy =

Russian footballer

Personal information
- Full name: Denis Viktorovich Koretskiy
- Date of birth: 19 June 1976 (age 50)
- Height: 1.75 m (5 ft 9 in)
- Position: Midfielder

Senior career*
Years	Team	Apps	(Gls)
1993–1996	FC Kolos Krasnodar	12	(0)
1993–1995	→ FC Kolos-2 Krasnodar (loans)	53	(6)
1996	FC Rostselmash Rostov-on-Don	3	(0)
1996	→ FC Rostselmash-2 Rostov-on-Don (loan)	13	(0)
1997	FC Kuban Krasnodar	0	(0)
1997	FC Laba Ust-Labinsk		
1998	FC Vagonnik Krasnodar		
1999	FC Dynamo Krasnodar		
2000	FC Kolos Pavlovskaya		
2000	FC Lokomotiv-Taym Mineralnye Vody (amateur)		
2000–2001	FC GNS-Spartak Krasnodar		
- * Club domestic league appearances and goals

Denis Viktorovich Koretskiy (Russian: Денис Викторович Корецкий; born 19 June 1976) is a former Russian football player.
