= Titín Drago =

Peruvian footballer and manager (born 1951)

Personal information
- Full name: Roberto Mario Drago Maturo
- Date of birth: 12 September 1951 (age 75)
- Place of birth: Lima, Peru
- Position: Midfielder

Youth career
- Universitario

Senior career*
Years	Team	Apps	(Gls)
1969–1973	Deportivo Municipal		
1974–1975	Defensor Lima		
1976	Deportivo Municipal		
1977	Atlético Chalaco		
1978–1980	Deportivo Municipal		
1981–1982	Sporting Cristal		
1983	Lawn Tennis		

Managerial career
- 1984: Alianza Atlético
- 1987: Lawn Tennis
- 1991: Peru U17
- 1992: Peru U20
- 1994: Alianza Atlético
- 1997: Deportivo Municipal
- 1997: Peru U17
- 2000–2002: Deportivo Municipal
- 2009–2010: Sport Boys
- * Club domestic league appearances and goals

Roberto Mario Drago Maturo (born 12 September 1951), known as Titín Drago, is a Peruvian football manager and former player.

His father, Roberto Drago Burga, was also a footballer, an idol of Deportivo Municipal.

== Biography ==
=== Playing career ===
Nicknamed Titín, Roberto Drago Maturo began his career at Deportivo Municipal in 1969. He also played for Defensor Lima, Atlético Chalaco and Sporting Cristal before hanging up his boots at Lawn Tennis, a 2nd division club, in 1983.

=== Managerial career ===
After becoming a coach, he led Alianza Atlético to second place in the Copa Perú in 1984, a club he would coach a second time in 1994. In the 1990s, he served as coach of Peru's youth national teams (U20 in 1992 and U17 twice, in 1991 and 1997).

Following in the footsteps of his father, who was a player and coach for Deportivo Municipal, Roberto Drago Maturo took over the reins of the club in 1997 and again from 2000 to 2002. However, it was with Sport Boys that he achieved true success, winning the Peruvian Second Division championship in 2009.

He worked as a sports commentator for the Peruvian sports channel Gol Perú, while also serving as president of the Peruvian Association of Racehorse Owners (APCCP).

== Honours ==
=== Player ===
Defensor Lima

- Copa Simón Bolívar: 1974

=== Manager ===
Sport Boys

- Peruvian Segunda División: 2009
