= Martin Lepa =

Estonian footballer

Personal information
- Full name: Martin Lepa
- Date of birth: 28 October 1976 (age 50)
- Place of birth: Estonia
- Position: Defender

International career^{‡}
Years	Team	Apps	(Gls)
1995	Estonia	5	(0)
- ‡ National team caps and goals as of 1 June 2009

Martin Lepa (born 28 October 1976) is a retired football defender from Estonia. He played for several clubs in his native country, including FC Flora Tallinn, FC Kuressaare and JK Tulevik Viljandi.

== International career ==
Lepa earned his first official cap for the Estonia national football team on 11 June, 1995, when Estonia played Slovenia in a qualifying match for Euro 1996. He obtained a total number of five caps for his native country.
