= Michael Frech =

German footballer

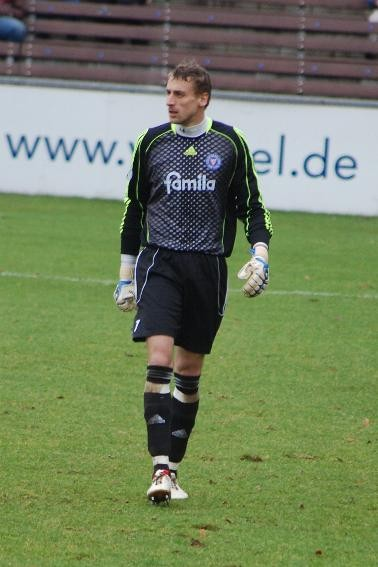
- Frech in 2008

Personal information
- Date of birth: 26 March 1976 (age 50)
- Place of birth: Flensburg, West Germany
- Height: 1.88 m (6 ft 2 in)
- Position: Goalkeeper

Youth career
- 1985–1995: SZ Arlewatt

Senior career*
Years	Team	Apps	(Gls)
1995–1997	SZ Arlewatt		
1997–1999	Husumer SV		
1999–2002	Heider SV		
2002–2004	Hamburger SV II	25	(0)
2004–2007	VfB Lübeck	118	(0)
2008	Sportfreunde Siegen	1	(0)
2008–2011	Holstein Kiel	95	(0)
- * Club domestic league appearances and goals

Michael Frech (born 26 March 1976) is a German former professional footballer who played as a goalkeeper.

== Career ==
Frech made his 3. Liga debut for Holstein Kiel on 25 July 2009, starting in the away match against Jahn Regensburg, which finished as a 2–0 loss.
