= Ralf Oehri =

Liechtenstein footballer

Personal information
- Full name: Ralf Oehri
- Date of birth: 26 October 1976 (age 50)
- Place of birth: Liechtenstein
- Position: Midfielder

Senior career*
Years	Team	Apps	(Gls)
1994–1996	FC Balzers		
1996–1997	FC Renens		
1997–2000	FC Rapperswil-Jona		
2000–2001	SC Kriens	12	(0)
2002–2003	FC Chur 97		

International career
1990–1998	Liechtenstein	10	(0)
- * Club domestic league appearances and goals

Ralf Oehri (born 26 October 1976) is a Liechtensteiner former association footballer who played as a midfielder. Between 1990 and 2002, he won 10 caps for the Liechtenstein national football team. If his date of birth is correct, he was only 13 when he won his first cap, the youngest European man to play senior international football. The rsssf site says he was three years older.
