= Paweł Gamla =

Polish footballer

Personal information
- Full name: Paweł Gamla
- Date of birth: 6 August 1976 (age 50)
- Place of birth: Lublin, Poland
- Height: 1.83 m (6 ft 0 in)
- Position: Defender

Senior career*
Years	Team	Apps	(Gls)
1993–2000	Avia Świdnik		
2000–2003	Hetman Zamość	65	(9)
2003–2011	Piast Gliwice	226	(23)
2011–2013	Polonia Bytom	25	(0)
2013	Ruch Zdzieszowice	13	(1)
2013	LZS Leśnica	15	(0)
2014	Ruch Zdzieszowice	14	(0)
- * Club domestic league appearances and goals

Paweł Gamla (born 6 August 1976) is a Polish former professional footballer who played as a defender.

== Career ==
=== Club ===
In July 2011, he joined Polonia Bytom on a one-year contract.
