= Yevgeni Fedotov =

Russian footballer and coach

Personal information
- Full name: Yevgeni Vladimirovich Fedotov
- Date of birth: 31 December 1976 (age 49)
- Height: 1.78 m (5 ft 10 in)
- Positions: Midfielder; defender

Senior career*
Years	Team	Apps	(Gls)
1998–2000	FC Viktoriya Komsomolsk-na-Amure		
2001–2002	FC Lokomotiv Chita	34	(1)
2003–2012	FC Smena Komsomolsk-na-Amure	251	(24)

Managerial career
- 2013–2017: FC Smena Komsomolsk-na-Amure (assistant)
- * Club domestic league appearances and goals

Yevgeni Vladimirovich Fedotov (Russian: Евгений Владимирович Федотов; born 31 December 1976) is a Russian professional football coach and a former player.

Fedotov played in the Russian Football National League with FC Lokomotiv Chita.

== Honours ==
- Russian Second Division, Zone East best midfielder: 2010.
