= IMI FC =

- Full name: International Marine Incorporated Fútbol Club
- Nickname(s): Los azules Los Petroleros
- Founded: 1992
- Dissolved: 2002
- Ground: Estadio Campeonísimo, Talara
- Capacity: 8,000
- Manager: Ignacio Davila
- League: Copa Perú
| Home colours | Away colours |

IMI Fútbol Club was a Peruvian football club, playing in the city of Talara.

== History ==
The club was the 1998 Copa Perú champion, when it defeated Coronel Bolognesi in the finals.

The club played one season at the highest level of Peruvian football in the 1999 Torneo Descentralizado; they had seven managers that season and won just six of their 44 games before being relegated.

The club folded in 2002.

== Honours ==
=== National ===
- Copa Perú: 1

Winners (1): 1998

=== Regional ===
- Región I: 1

Winners (1): 1998

- Liga Departamental de Piura: 1

Winners (2): 1996, 1998
Runner-up (2): 1997, 2001

- Liga Distrital de Pariñas: 1

Winners (1): 1995

== See also ==
- List of football clubs in Peru
- Peruvian football league system
