= José Burtovoy =

Argentine footballer (born 1976)

Personal information
- Full name: José Pablo Burtovoy Sansone
- Date of birth: 6 November 1976 (age 49)
- Place of birth: Santa Fe, Argentina
- Height: 1.86 m (6 ft 1 in)
- Position: Goalkeeper

Senior career*
Years	Team	Apps	(Gls)
1996–2000	Colón de Santa Fe	42	(0)
2000	CD Veracruz	2	(0)
2001–2002	Belgrano	0	(0)
2002–2003	Arsenal de Sarandí	0	(0)
2003–2004	Chacarita Juniors	3	(0)
2004–2005	Pioneros de Ciudad Obregón	41	(0)
2005–2006	León	39	(0)
2006	Independiente Santa Fe	10	(0)
2007	Real Potosí	33	(0)
2008	Provincial Osorno	25	(0)
2008	Wilstermann	8	(0)
2009	Deportivo Anzoátegui	3	(0)
2010	Sport Boys	10	(0)
2010–2011	C.A.I.	16	(0)
2011–2012	Central Córdoba		
2012–2014	Brown de Adrogué	46	(0)
2014–2015	Central Córdoba	16	(0)
- * Club domestic league appearances and goals

José Pablo Burtovoy (born 6 November 1976) was an Argentine football goalkeeper. He retired in early 2015. After his retirement Burtovoy was part of the management of Bolivia's Soccer team.

== Career ==
Burtovoy has previously played for Colón de Santa Fe, CD Veracruz, Club Atlético Belgrano, Arsenal de Sarandí, Chacarita Juniors, Pioneros de Ciudad Obregón, Club León (this last two in Mexico) and Independiente Santa Fe (this last in Colombia).

In 2007, Burtovoy helped Real Potosí to win the Bolivian league for the first time in their history.

== Honours ==
=== Club ===
- Real Potosí
  - Liga de Fútbol Profesional Boliviano: 2007 (A)

=== Individual ===
- Primera División A All-Star: 2004–05
- Primera División A All-Star Game MVP: 2004–05
