= Tõnis Kalde =

Estonian footballer

Personal information
- Full name: Tõnis Kalde
- Date of birth: 11 August 1976 (age 50)
- Place of birth: Estonia
- Height: 1.81 m (5 ft 11 1/2 in)
- Position: Midfielder

International career^{‡}
Years	Team	Apps	(Gls)
1995	Estonia	2	(0)
- ‡ National team caps and goals as of 23 May 2009

Tõnis Kalde (born 11 August 1976) is a retired football midfielder from Estonia. He played for several clubs in his native country, including FC Kuressaare, and appeared twice for the Estonian national team.

== International career ==
Kalde earned his first official cap for the Estonia national football team on 19 May 1995, when Estonia played Latvia at the Baltic Cup 1995. He obtained a total number of two caps.
