= Giovanni Naboth =

Mauritian footballer

Personal information
- Full name: Giovanni Naboth
- Date of birth: 26 August 1976 (age 50)
- Place of birth: Mauritius
- Position: Defender

Senior career*
Years	Team	Apps	(Gls)
2001–2010	Savanne SC	?	(?)
2011–	Petite Rivière Noire SC	?	(?)

International career
2002–2006	Mauritius	10	(0)
- * Club domestic league appearances and goals

Giovanni Naboth (born 26 August 1976) is a Mauritian footballer who currently plays as a defender for Petite Rivière Noire SC. He won 10 caps for the Mauritius national football team between 2002 and 2006.
