= Eran Shainzinger =

Israeli footballer

Eran Shainzinger ערן שיינזינגר
Personal information
- Full name: Eran Shainzinger
- Date of birth: December 3, 1976 (age 49)
- Place of birth: Israel
- Position: Goalkeeper

Team information
- Current team: FC Karmiel Safed

Youth career
- Hapoel Kfar Saba

Senior career*
Years	Team	Apps	(Gls)
1995–1998	Hapoel Kfar Saba	83	(0)
1998–2000	Maccabi Netanya	66	(0)
2000–2001	Hapoel Tzafririm Holon	25	(0)
2001–2003	Hapoel Kfar Saba	46	(0)
2006–2007	Hapoel Lod	24	(0)
2007–2009	Ironi Tiberias	49	(0)
2009–2010	FC Karmiel Safed	26	(0)

International career
1994–1995	Israel U-21	2	(0)
1999	Israel	3	(0)
- * Club domestic league appearances and goals

Eran Shainzinger (Hebrew: ערן שיינזינגר) is an Israeli footballer currently playing at FC Karmiel Safed.

== Honours ==
- Israeli Second Division (2):
  - 1998-99, 2001–02
- Liga Alef - South (1):
  - 2006-07

== See also ==
- Football in Israel
- List of football clubs in Israel
