= Segundo Matamba =

Ecuadorian footballer (born 1976)

Personal information
- Full name: Segundo Manuel Matamba Cabezas
- Date of birth: 19 May 1976 (age 50)
- Place of birth: Guayaquil, Ecuador
- Height: 1.79 m (5 ft 10 in)
- Position: Defender

Team information
- Current team: Barcelona
- Number: 14

Youth career
- 1992–1995: Barcelona

Senior career*
Years	Team	Apps	(Gls)
1992–1994	Barcelona	29	(0)
1995	Aucas Quito	34	(1)
1996	Deportivo Cuenca	8	(0)
1998	Delfín	30	(2)
1999	Barcelona	19	(2)
2001	Santa Rita	20	(0)
2002–2004	Deportivo Cuenca	93	(0)
2005	Macará	19	(0)
2005	Deportivo Cuenca	2	(0)
2006–2007	Deportivo Quito	74	(0)
2008–2009	Barcelona	25	(1)

International career^{‡}
2001	Ecuador	1	(0)
- * Club domestic league appearances and goals as of 21 September 2009 ‡ National team caps and goals as of 21 September 2009

Segundo Manuel Matamba Cabezas (born 19 May 1976) is an Ecuadorian former footballer who played for Barcelona and the Ecuador national team. He is known as one of the top defenders in the domestic tournament.

== Club career ==
Matamba started out as a Barcelona Sporting Club youth product, but got very little playing time in the beginning. In 1999, he got the opportunity to start in the primary team. Matamba has played in top clubs in Ecuador like, Deportivo Cuenca, Macará, Deportivo Quito. In 2008 Matamba returned to play for the team that gave him that opportunity to play in the majors, Barcelona.
