= Joël Bouchoucha =

French footballer (born 1976)

Personal information
- Date of birth: 3 January 1976 (age 50)
- Place of birth: Nîmes, France
- Height: 1.86 m (6 ft 1 in)
- Position: Striker

Team information
- Current team: AS Yzeure
- Number: 44

Senior career*
Years	Team	Apps	(Gls)
19??–1996	St. Étienne		
1996–2000	Nîmes		
2000–2002	FF Jaro		
2004–	AS Yzeure	276	(154)
- * Club domestic league appearances and goals

Joël Bouchoucha (born 3 January 1976) is a French professional footballer. He currently plays for French side AS Yzeure.

Bouchoucha played for St. Étienne prior to joining Nîmes in 1996. After scoring at least 12 goals a season for Nîmes in 1996-97, 1997–98 and 1998–99, he joined Torquay United on trial in September 1999. After a week on trial, Torquay manager Wes Saunders decided that Bouchoucha was not the target-man style forward (or even as tall as) he had been expecting and Bouchoucha returned to Nîmes. On 23 September 1999 he joined Hartlepool United on trial, but again failed to win a contract. He also spent some time at Carlisle United and at Portuguese side Vilanovense. In January 2000 he joined Finnish side FF Jaro.

He joined AS Yzeure in July 2004. He scored 25 goals in 32 games for Yzeure in the 2006-07 season and remains with the club in the 2008-09 season.

== Career history ==
Correct as of December 10, 2008

Club Performance
Club	Season	League		National Cup		League Cup		Other		Total	
Club	Season	App	Goals	App	Goals	App	Goals	App	Goals	App	Goals
AS Yzeure	2004-05	25	4								
AS Yzeure	2005-06	25	23	1	0						
AS Yzeure	2006-07	32	25	1	0						
AS Yzeure	2007-08	29	21								
AS Yzeure	2008-09	33	30								
