= Rustam Shelayev =

Russian footballer

Personal information
- Full name: Rustam Khabibulovich Shelayev
- Date of birth: 30 March 1976 (age 50)
- Height: 1.80 m (5 ft 11 in)
- Positions: Goalkeeper; forward (Note: Shelayev played a forward earlier in his career.)

Senior career*
Years	Team	Apps	(Gls)
1993–1994	FC Kaspiy Kaspiysk	43	(0)
1995–1996	FC Anzhi-2 Makhachkala	46	(0)
1997	FC Anzhi Makhachkala	1	(0)
1997	FC Anzhi-d Makhachkala	44	(0)
1998–2000	FC Dynamo Makhachkala	61	(0)
2001	Shahdag Guba	2	(0)
2001	FC Dynamo Makhachkala	30	(0)
2002	FC VKZ Izerbashsky Izerbash		
2002	FC Khimik Koryazhma (amateur)		
2003–2004	FC Dagdizel Kaspiysk (amateur)		
2009	FC Dagdizel Kaspiysk	0	(0)
- * Club domestic league appearances and goals

Rustam Khabibulovich Shelayev (Russian: Рустам Хабибулович Шелаев; born 30 March 1976) is a former Russian professional football player.

== Club career ==
He made his Russian Football National League debut for FC Anzhi Makhachkala on 16 October 1997 in a game against PFC Spartak Nalchik. That was his only season in the FNL.
