= Viktor Pyatanov =

Russian footballer

Personal information
- Full name: Viktor Vladimirovich Pyatanov
- Date of birth: 29 December 1976 (age 49)
- Height: 1.80 m (5 ft 11 in)
- Position: Defender

Youth career
- DYuSSh-8 Nizhny Novgorod

Senior career*
Years	Team	Apps	(Gls)
1994–1995	FC Lokomotiv Nizhny Novgorod	6	(0)
1996	FC Torpedo-Viktoriya Nizhny Novgorod		(amateur)
2005	FC Lokomotiv Lukoyanov		
- * Club domestic league appearances and goals

Viktor Vladimirovich Pyatanov (Russian: Виктор Владимирович Пятанов; born 29 December 1976) is a former Russian football player.
