= Mickaël Garciau =

French footballer (born 1976)

Personal information
- Date of birth: 13 September 1976 (age 50)
- Place of birth: Nantes
- Position: Defender

Senior career*
Years	Team	Apps	(Gls)
1995–1997	FC Nantes	1	(0)
1997–1999	Olympique Alès		
1999–2007	SC Draguignan		
- * Club domestic league appearances and goals

Mickaël Garciau (born 13 September 1976) is a retired French football defender.
