= 1998 Copa Perú =

Copa Perú
- Season: 1998
- Champions: I.M.I.

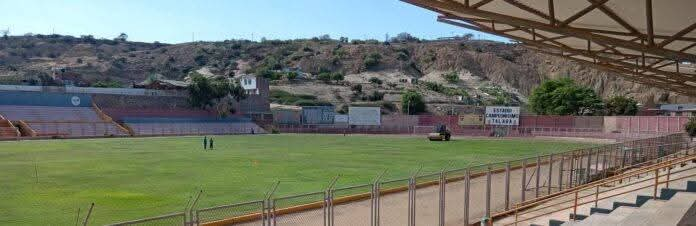
Campeonísimo Stadium, Talara, Peru.

The 1998 Copa Perú season (Spanish: Copa Perú 1998), the promotion tournament of Peruvian football.

The tournament has five stages. The first four stages are played as mini-league round-robin tournaments, except for third stage in region IV, which is played as a knockout stage. The final stage features two knockout rounds and a final four-team group stage to determine the two promoted teams.

The 1998 Peru Cup started with the District Stage (Spanish: Etapa Distrital) on February. The next stage was the Provincial Stage (Spanish: Etapa Provincial) which started, on June. The tournament continued with the Departmental Stage (Spanish: Etapa Departamental) on July. The Regional Staged followed. The National Stage (Spanish: Etapa Nacional) started on November. The winner and runner-up of the National Stage will be promoted to the First Division.

== Team changes ==
Promoted to 1998 Primera División	Relegated from 1997 Primera División	Relegated from 1997 Segunda División
▲ Juan Aurich (1st)	▼ Atlético Torino (12th) ▼ José Gálvez (13th) ▼ La Loretana (14th)	▼ San Agustín (11th) ▼ Unión Supe (12th) ▼ Defensor Lima (13th) ▼ Ciclista Lima (14th)

== Departmental Stage ==
The following list shows the teams that qualified for the Regional Stage.

Department	Team	Location
Amazonas	Cultural Utcubamba	Amazonas
Ancash	Sport Ancash	Ancash
Ancash	José Gálvez	Chimbote
Apurímac	Unión Grauína	Abancay
Arequipa	Senati	Arequipa
Ayacucho	Deportivo DASA	Ayacucho
Cajamarca	UTC	Cajamarca
Callao	Somos Aduanas	Callao
Cusco	Deportivo Garcilaso	Cusco
Huancavelica	Unión Recuperada	Huancavelica
Huánuco	Señor de Puelles	Huánuco
Ica	Estudiantes de Medicina	Ica
Junín	Cultural Hidro	Junín
La Libertad	Deportivo UPAO	La Libertad

Department	Team	Location
Lambayeque	Deportivo Pomalca	Lambayeque
Lima	Deportivo Repcel	Lima
Lima	Telefunken 20	Lima
Loreto	CNI	Iquitos
Madre de Dios	Sport Miguel Grau	Madre de Dios
Moquegua	Peñarol	Moquegua
Pasco	UNDAC	Pasco
Piura	Atlético Torino	Talara
Piura	I.M.I.	Talara
Puno	Alfonso Ugarte	Puno
San Martín	Hospital Rural	San Martín
Tacna	Coronel Bolognesi	Tacna
Tumbes	Victor Loli	Tumbes
Ucayali	La Loretana	Ucayali
Ucayali	San Martín de Porres	Ucayali

== Regional Stage ==
=== Region I ===
Region I includes qualified teams from Amazonas, Lambayeque, Tumbes and Piura region.

==== Group A ====
Pos	Team	Pld	W	D	L	GF	GA	GD	Pts	Qualification	IMI	TOR	VLT
1	I.M.I.	4	2	1	1	7	3	+4	7	Final Group			
2	Atlético Torino	4	2	1	1	4	4	0	7				
3	Victor Loli	4	0	2	2	2	6	−4	2				

Legend: Blue = home team win; Yellow = draw; Red = away team win.

===== Playoff =====
Team 1	Score	Team 2
I.M.I.	2–1	Atlético Torino

==== Group B ====
Pos	Team	Pld	W	D	L	GF	GA	GD	Pts	Qualification	POM	CUT
1	Deportivo Pomalca	2	2	0	0	12	3	+9	6	Final Group		
2	Cultural Utcubamba	2	0	0	2	3	12	−9	0			

Legend: Blue = home team win; Yellow = draw; Red = away team win.

==== Final Group ====
Pos	Team	Pld	W	D	L	GF	GA	GD	Pts	Qualification	IMI	POM
1	I.M.I.	2	0	2	0	3	3	0	2	National stage		
2	Deportivo Pomalca	2	0	2	0	3	3	0	2			

Legend: Blue = home team win; Yellow = draw; Red = away team win.

===== Tiebreaker =====
Team 1	Score	Team 2
I.M.I.	2–0	Deportivo Pomalca

=== Region II ===
Region II includes qualified teams from Ancash, Cajamarca and La Libertad region.

Pos	Team	Pld	W	D	L	GF	GA	GD	Pts	Qualification	UTC	ÁNC	GAL	UPAO
1	UTC	6	3	0	3	13	12	+1	9	National stage				
2	Sport Áncash	6	3	0	3	8	9	−1	9					
3	José Gálvez	6	2	2	2	10	10	0	8					
4	Deportivo UPAO	6	2	2	2	8	8	0	8					

Legend: Blue = home team win; Yellow = draw; Red = away team win.

==== Tiebreaker ====
Team 1	Score	Team 2
UTC	1–0	Sport Áncash

=== Region III ===
Region III includes qualified teams from Loreto, San Martín and Ucayali region.

Pos	Team	Pld	W	D	L	GF	GA	GD	Pts	Qualification	CNI	LOR	HRS	SMP
1	CNI	6	4	1	1	10	8	+2	13	National stage				
2	La Loretana	6	4	1	1	7	4	+3	13					
3	Hospital Rural	6	1	1	4	8	9	−1	4					
4	San Martín de Porres	6	1	1	4	5	9	−4	4					

Legend: Blue = home team win; Yellow = draw; Red = away team win.

==== Tiebreaker ====
Team 1	Score	Team 2
CNI	3–2	La Loretana

=== Region IV ===
Region IV includes qualified teams from Callao, Ica and Lima region.

Pos	Team	Pld	W	D	L	GF	GA	GD	Pts	Qualification	SCO	GRA	DSA	DPR
1	Telefunken 20	6	4	1	1	10	2	+8	13	National stage				
2	Estudiantes de Medicina	6	4	1	1	11	3	+8	13					
3	Somos Aduanas	6	2	2	2	8	5	+3	8					
4	Deportivo Repcel	6	0	0	6	0	19	−19	0					

Legend: Blue = home team win; Yellow = draw; Red = away team win.

==== Tiebreaker ====
Team 1	Score	Team 2
Telefunken 20	3–0	Estudiantes de Medicina

=== Region V ===
Region V includes qualified teams from Huánuco, Junín and Pasco region.

Pos	Team	Pld	W	D	L	GF	GA	GD	Pts	Qualification	CHI	SPH	UND
1	Cultural Hidro	4	3	0	1	8	2	+6	9	National stage			
2	Señor de Puelles	4	2	1	1	8	3	+5	7				
3	UNDAC	4	0	1	3	0	11	−11	1				

Legend: Blue = home team win; Yellow = draw; Red = away team win.

Note: Originally Señor de Puelles (8 pts) won the group. But after a complaint by Hidro, this team received 3 pts from its match against Señor de Puelles, hence obtaining first place.

=== Region VI ===
Region VI includes qualified teams from Apurímac, Ayacucho and Huancavelica region.

Pos	Team	Pld	W	D	L	GF	GA	GD	Pts	Qualification	UGR	DAS	URE
1	Unión Grauína	4	3	0	1	9	3	+6	9	National stage			
2	Deportivo DASA	4	3	0	1	11	4	+7	9				
3	Unión Recuperada	4	0	0	4	3	16	−13	0				

Legend: Blue = home team win; Yellow = draw; Red = away team win.

==== Tiebreaker ====
Team 1	Score	Team 2
Unión Grauína	0–0 (4–3 p)	Deportivo DASA

=== Region VII ===
Region VII includes qualified teams from Cusco, Madre de Dios and Puno region.

Pos	Team	Pld	W	D	L	GF	GA	GD	Pts	Qualification	ALF	DPG	MGP
1	Alfonso Ugarte	4	3	0	1	15	1	+14	9	National stage		3–0	
2	Deportivo Garcilaso	4	3	0	1	11	4	+7	9				
3	Sport Miguel Grau	4	0	0	4	0	21	−21	0				

Legend: Blue = home team win; Yellow = draw; Red = away team win.

==== Tiebreaker ====
Team 1	Score	Team 2
Alfonso Ugarte	2–1	Deportivo Garcilaso

=== Region VIII ===
Region VIII includes qualified teams from Arequipa, Moquegua and Tacna region.

Pos	Team	Pld	W	D	L	GF	GA	GD	Pts	Qualification	BOL	SEN	PEÑ
1	Coronel Bolognesi	4	3	1	0	11	1	+10	10	National stage			
2	Senati	3	1	1	1	4	6	−2	4				
3	Peñarol	3	0	0	3	2	10	−8	0				

Legend: Blue = home team win; Yellow = draw; Red = away team win.

Note: Because both teams were already eliminated, Senati and Peñarol agreed to not play their match.

== National Stage ==
The National Stage started in November. The winners of the National Stage will be promoted to the 1999 Torneo Descentralizado.

Quarterfinals
Cultural Hidro	4	0	4
I.M.I.	0	5	5
UTC	2	0	2
Alfonso Ugarte	4	1	5
CNI	1	1	2
Telefunken 20	2	1	3
Coronel Bolognesi	5	0	5
Unión Grauína	0	1	1

Semifinals
I.M.I.	0	5	5
Alfonso Ugarte	4	0	4
Telefunken 20	0	1	1
Coronel Bolognesi	1	1	2

Finals
I.M.I.	1	3	4
Coronel Bolognesi	3	1	4

=== Quarterfinals ===
Team 1	Agg.	Team 2	1st leg	2nd leg
Cultural Hidro	4–5	I.M.I.	4–0	0–5
UTC	2–5	Alfonso Ugarte	2–4	0–1
CNI	2–3	Telefunken 20	1–2	1–1
Coronel Bolognesi	5–1	Unión Grauína	5–0	0–1

=== Semifinals ===
Team 1	Agg.	Team 2	1st leg	2nd leg
Alfonso Ugarte	4–5	I.M.I.	4–0	0–5
Coronel Bolognesi	2–1	Telefunken 20	1–0	1–1

=== Final ===
- The second leg was abandoned after 81 minutes because of a brawl started by Bolognesi players. The F.P.F. (Peruvian Football Federation) declared the match ended by 3-1; and as it should have been a penalty shootout, I.M.I. was declared shootout winner by 2-0, and hence 1998 champions.

Team 1	Agg.	Team 2	1st leg	2nd leg
Coronel Bolognesi	4–4	I.M.I.	3–1	1–3

== See also ==
- 1998 Torneo Descentralizado
- 1998 Peruvian Segunda División
