= Yevgeni Zhelyakov =

Russian footballer

Personal information
- Full name: Yevgeni Ivanovich Zhelyakov
- Date of birth: 13 July 1976 (age 50)
- Height: 1.91 m (6 ft 3 in)
- Position: Goalkeeper

Team information
- Current team: FC Salyut Belgorod (assistant coach)

Senior career*
Years	Team	Apps	(Gls)
1994	FC Dynamo-Gazovik Tyumen	0	(0)
1995–1996	FC Dynamo-Gazovik-d Tyumen	30	(0)
1997	FC Tyumen	0	(0)
1999	FC Spartak-Chukotka Moscow	0	(0)
2001–2002	FC Tyumen	4	(0)
2003	FC Slavyansk Slavyansk-na-Kubani	18	(0)
2005	FC Dynamo Bryansk	4	(0)
2005	FC Lokomotiv Kaluga	14	(0)
2006	FC Don Novomoskovsk	11	(0)
2007	FC Sakhalin Yuzhno-Sakhalinsk	14	(0)
2008	FC Sibiryak Bratsk	24	(0)
2010	FC Mostovik-Primorye Ussuriysk	8	(0)

Managerial career
- 2020–: FC Salyut Belgorod (assistant)
- * Club domestic league appearances and goals

Yevgeni Ivanovich Zhelyakov (Russian: Евгений Иванович Желяков; born 13 July 1976) is a Russian professional football coach and a former player. He is an assistant coach with FC Salyut Belgorod.

== Club career ==
Zhelyakov appeared in four Russian Football National League matches while with FC Dynamo Bryansk.
