= Uriel Pérez =

Uruguayan footballer (born 1976)

Personal information
- Full name: Uriel Pérez Jaurena
- Date of birth: 28 February 1976 (age 50)
- Place of birth: Montevideo, Uruguay
- Height: 1.82 m (6 ft 0 in)
- Position: Forward

Senior career*
Years	Team	Apps	(Gls)
1993–1994	Huracán Buceo		
1995	Montevideo Wanderers		
1996	Huracán Buceo		
1997	Deportes Antofagasta	11	(0)
1997–1998	Huracán Buceo		
1998	Mérida	0	(0)
1999	Cruz Azul		
1999–2000	Huracán Buceo		
2001–2002	Colón FC	36	(12)
2002–2003	Belgrano	33	(8)
2003–2004	San Martín SJ	31	(12)
2004–2005	Nueva Chicago	31	(4)
2005	San Martín SJ	9	(1)
2006	Oriente Petrolero	2	(0)
2006	Almagro	13	(2)
2007	Platense	16	(2)
2007	Defensores de Belgrano VR	18	(1)
- * Club domestic league appearances and goals

Uriel Pérez Jaurena (born February 28, 1976, in Montevideo, Uruguay), known as Uriel Pérez, is a former Uruguayan footballer who played for clubs in Uruguay, Chile, Spain, Mexico, Argentina and Bolivia.

== Teams ==
- (Uruguay) Huracán Buceo 1993–1994
- (Uruguay) Montevideo Wanderers 1995
- (Uruguay) Huracán Buceo 1996
- (Chile) Deportes Antofagasta 1997
- (Uruguay) Huracán Buceo 1997–1998
- (Spain) Mérida 1998
- (Mexico) Cruz Azul 1999
- (Uruguay) Huracán Buceo 1999–2000
- (Uruguay) Colón 2001–2002
- (Argentina) Belgrano 2002–2003
- (Argentina) San Martín de San Juan 2003–2004
- (Argentina) Nueva Chicago 2004–2005
- (Argentina) San Martín de San Juan 2005
- (Bolivia) Oriente Petrolero 2006
- (Argentina) Almagro 2006
- (Argentina) Platense 2007
- (Argentina) Defensores de Belgrano de Villa Ramallo 2007

== Post-retirement ==
Pérez has served as a football agent.
