= Maksim Proshin =

Russian footballer

Personal information
- Full name: Maksim Aleksandrovich Proshin
- Date of birth: 13 February 1976 (age 50)
- Height: 1.73 m (5 ft 8 in)
- Position: Midfielder

Senior career*
Years	Team	Apps	(Gls)
1993	FC Ilmen Novgorod (D4)		
1994	FC Zenit-d St. Petersburg	10	(1)
1995	FC Lokomotiv St. Petersburg	24	(0)
1996–1998	FC Torpedo Pavlovo	99	(8)
1999	FC Torpedo-Viktoriya Nizhny Novgorod	40	(2)
2000	FC Baltika Kaliningrad	19	(0)
2000	FC Volgar-Gazprom Astrakhan	9	(0)
2001–2002	FC Dynamo-SPb St. Petersburg	48	(8)
2002	FC Petrotrest St. Petersburg (D4)		
2002–2005	FC Metallurg Lipetsk	110	(17)
2005–2006	FC SKA-Energiya Khabarovsk	29	(3)
2007	FC Avangard Kursk	10	(0)
2008	FC Garant-Sport Novgorod (D4)		
2008–2011	FC Sever Murmansk	95	(15)
- * Club domestic league appearances and goals

Maksim Aleksandrovich Proshin (Russian: Максим Александрович Прошин; born 13 February 1976) is a Russian former professional football player.

== Club career ==
He played eight seasons in the Russian Football National League for seven different clubs.
