= Atko Väikmeri =

Estonian footballer

Personal information
- Full name: Atko Väikmeri
- Date of birth: 25 December 1976 (age 49)
- Place of birth: Estonia
- Position: Defender

Youth career
- 1995–97: Tervis Pärnu

Senior career*
Years	Team	Apps	(Gls)
2008–09	FC Toompea	29	(28)
2010	Eesti Koondis	2	(1)
2011	Tallinna Kalev III	3	(0)

International career
1995	Estonia	2	(0)
- * Club domestic league appearances and goals

Atko Väikmeri (born 25 December 1976) is an Estonian football coach and former football defender. He played for several clubs in his native country, including JK Tervis Pärnu.

He has worked as a coach for JK Tallinna Kalev's youth teams, women's team and assisted their U21 team. From 2020 he works as a coach for FC Nõmme United youth teams.

== International career ==
Väikmeri earned his first official cap for the Estonia national football team on 19 May 1995, when Estonia played Latvia at the Baltic Cup 1995. He obtained a total number of two caps.
