= Giovanni Seynhaeve =

Belgian footballer

Personal information
- Date of birth: 21 July 1976 (age 50)
- Position: Defender

Senior career*
Years	Team	Apps	(Gls)
1993–2001	R.E. Mouscron		
2001–2003	R.C.S. Visétois		
2003–2005	A.F.C. Tubize		
2005–2009	R.R.C. Péruwelz		
- * Club domestic league appearances and goals

Giovanni Seynhaeve (born 21 July 1976) is a retired Belgian football defender.
