= Oleksandr Sokorenko =

Ukrainian footballer and coach

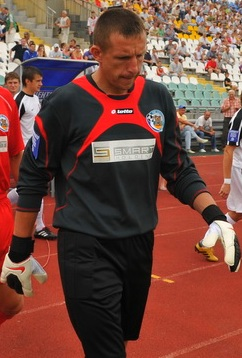

Personal information
- Full name: Oleksandr Mykolayovych Sokorenko
- Date of birth: 23 February 1976 (age 50)
- Place of birth: Kharkiv, Ukrainian SSR, now Ukraine
- Height: 1.85 m (6 ft 1 in)
- Position: Goalkeeper

Team information
- Current team: FC SKChF Sevastopol (assistant manager)

Senior career*
Years	Team	Apps	(Gls)
1993	FC More Feodosiya	3	(0)
1994–1999	FC Chayka Sevastopol	98	(0)
1999–2000	SC Tavriya Simferopol	2	(0)
2000	FC Zakarpattia Uzhhorod	0	(0)
2000	FC Tytan Armyansk	4	(0)
2002–2003	FC Krymteplytsia Molodizhne	16	(0)
2004–2012	PFC Sevastopol	182	(0)

Managerial career
- 2014–: FC SKChF Sevastopol (assistant)
- * Club domestic league appearances and goals as of 5 May 2013

Oleksandr Sokorenko (Ukrainian: Олександр Миколайович Сокоренко; born 23 February 1976) is a Ukrainian football coach and a former goalkeeper. He works as an assistant manager with FC SKChF Sevastopol.
