= 1997 Peruvian Segunda División =

Peruvian Segunda División
- Season: 1997
- Champions: Lawn Tennis
- Relegated: Ciclista Lima; Defensor Lima; Unión Supe; San Agustin
- Top goalscorer: Roberto Salazar (23 goals)

The 1997 Peruvian Segunda División, the second division of Peruvian football (soccer), was played by 14 teams. the tournament winner, Lawn Tennis was promoted to the 1998 Torneo Descentralizado. The tournament was played on a home-and-away round-robin basis.

== Teams ==
=== Team changes ===
Relegated from 1996 Primera División	Promoted from 1996 Liga Provincial de Lima	Promoted from 1996 Liga Departamental de Lima	Promoted to 1997 Primera División	Relegated to 1997 Copa Perú
▼ Ciclista Lima (14th) ▼ Guardia Republicana (15th) ▼ San Agustín (16th)	▲AELU (1st)	▲ Unión Supe (2nd)	▲ Alcides Vigo (1st)	▼ Santa Marina Norte (11th) ▼ Virgen de Chapi (12th)

=== Stadia and Locations ===
Team	City
AELU	Pueblo Libre, Lima
Bella Esperanza	Cerro Azul, Lima
Ciclista Lima	Breña, Lima
Defensor Lima	Breña, Lima
Deportivo Zúñiga	La Molina, Lima
Guardia Republicana	La Molina, Lima
Hijos de Yurimaguas	Callao
Lawn Tennis	Jesús María, Lima
Metor Sport	Lima
San Agustín	Lima
Sport Agustino	El Agustino, Lima
Unión Huaral	Huaral
Unión Supe	Supe
Universitario de América	San Luis, Lima

== League table ==
=== Standings ===
Pos	Team	Pld	W	D	L	GF	GA	GD	Pts	Promotion or relegation
1	Lawn Tennis (C)	26	19	5	2	52	21	+31	62	1998 Primera División
2	Bella Esperanza	26	19	4	3	55	17	+38	61	
3	Hijos de Yurimaguas	26	15	6	5	45	21	+24	51	
4	Sport Agustino	26	16	2	8	55	30	+25	50	
5	Guardia Republicana	26	11	7	8	35	28	+7	40	
6	Unión Huaral	26	12	4	10	40	35	+5	40	
7	Deportivo Zúñiga	26	10	8	8	42	32	+10	38	
8	Universitario de América	26	10	7	9	30	27	+3	37	
9	AELU	26	11	3	12	55	45	+10	36	
10	Meteor Sport	26	8	7	11	26	34	−8	31	
11	San Agustín (R)	26	6	4	16	28	58	−30	22	Relegation to 1998 Copa Perú
12	Unión Supe (R)	26	4	5	17	27	57	−30	17	Relegation to 1998 Copa Perú
13	Defensor Lima (R)	26	3	4	19	17	58	−41	13	Relegation to 1998 Copa Perú
14	Ciclista Lima (R)	26	2	6	18	29	73	−44	12	Relegation to 1998 Copa Perú

Updated to match(es) played on 1997. Source:
Rules for classification: 1) points; 2) goal difference; 3) number of goals scored.
(C) Champions; (R) Relegated

== See also ==
- 1997 Torneo Descentralizado
- 1997 Copa Perú
