= Sylvain Ovono =

Cameroonian footballer (born 1976)

Personal information
- Full name: Sylvain Alex Ovono
- Date of birth: 27 August 1972 (age 54)
- Place of birth: Yaoundé, Cameroon
- Position: Forward

Senior career*
Years	Team	Apps	(Gls)
1996–1997	Sivasspor		
1998	Vanspor	6	(0)
1998–2000	Naval	12	(1)
2000	Keratsini		
2000–2001	Portimonense	12	(0)
2002–2003	Espinho		
2003–2004	Moura		
2004–2005	Pombal	24	(2)
2005–2006	Castrense		
2006–2007	Gândara		
2007–2008	Lusitânia	13	(1)
2008–2009	Sourense	18	(2)
- * Club domestic league appearances and goals

Sylvain Alex Ovono (born 27 August 1972) is a retired Cameroonian footballer, who played as a forward.

== Football career ==
Born in Yaoundé, Ovono began playing football in Europe in Turkey, starting with modest Sivasspor, then switching to the Süper Lig in the 1997–98 season, appearing very rarely for the last-placed team, Belediye Vanspor.

In the following decade, almost uninterrupted, he played in Portugal, mostly in the lower leagues. The best he achieved was appearing two seasons in the second division for Associação Naval 1º de Maio (only 12 matches over the course of two seasons combined). After a very brief spell in Greece, he resumed his career in the country, appearing for seven different clubs (notably Portimonense SC, when it was in the third level).

In 2001, Ovono had an unsuccessful trial at 1. FC Union Berlin in Germany. After returning to Portugal, he eventually retired at the age of 33, his last club being Grupo Desportivo Sourense in Soure.
