= Yuri Kolchin =

Russian footballer

Personal information
- Full name: Yuri Yevgenyevich Kolchin
- Date of birth: 22 December 1976 (age 49)
- Place of birth: Krasnodar, Russian SFSR
- Height: 1.80 m (5 ft 11 in)
- Positions: Forward; midfielder

Youth career
- SDYuShOR-4 Tolyatti

Senior career*
Years	Team	Apps	(Gls)
1995–1998	FC Lada Togliatti	68	(4)
1995	→ FC Lada-d Togliatti	18	(0)
1999	FC Neftyanik Pokhvistnevo	5	(0)
2000–2002	FC Balakovo	57	(5)
2002–2003	FC Elektronika Nizhny Novgorod	40	(4)
2004	SKP Togliatti		
- * Club domestic league appearances and goals

Yuri Yevgenyevich Kolchin (Russian: Юрий Евгеньевич Колчин; born 22 December 1976) is a former Russian football player.
