= Diego Penalva =

French footballer (born 1976)

Personal information
- Date of birth: January 22, 1976 (age 50)
- Place of birth: Orange, France
- Height: 1.75 m (5 ft 9 in)
- Position: Midfielder

Senior career*
Years	Team	Apps	(Gls)
1995–1996	Saint-Étienne (B team)		
1997–1998	FC Martigues	3	(0)
1998–	US Le Pontet		
- * Club domestic league appearances and goals as of 15:49, 25 November 2009 (UTC)

Diego Penalva (born January 22, 1976) is a French retired professional football player.

Penalva began playing football with local side SC Orange, making an appearance in a 1996–97 Coupe de France match against his future club, FC Martigues. He had a brief stint on the professional level in Ligue 2 with FC Martigues.
