= Roman Baranov (footballer) =

Russian footballer and coach

Personal information
- Full name: Roman Vladimirovich Baranov
- Date of birth: 22 July 1976 (age 50)
- Place of birth: Nizhny Tagil, Russian SFSR
- Height: 1.75 m (5 ft 9 in)
- Position: Forward

Team information
- Current team: FC Tyumen (academy coach)

Youth career
- FC Geolog Tyumen

Senior career*
Years	Team	Apps	(Gls)
1993–1994	FC Stroitel Tyumen		
1995–1996	FC Dynamo-Gazovik-d Tyumen	0	(0)
1995–1996	→ FC Dynamo-Gazovik-d Tyumen (loans)	38	(4)
1997–1998	FC Irtysh Tobolsk	34	(1)
1998–1999	FC Tyumen	47	(1)
2000	FC Baltika Kaliningrad	29	(0)
2001	FC Tyumen	3	(1)
2003–2005	FC Tyumen (amateur)		

Managerial career
- 2011–: FC Tyumen (academy)
- * Club domestic league appearances and goals

Roman Vladimirovich Baranov (Russian: Роман Владимирович Баранов; born 22 July 1976 in Nizhny Tagil) is a Russian football coach and a former player. He works as a children's coach with FC Tyumen.
