= 1998 Torneo Descentralizado =

Torneo Descentralizado
- Season: 1998
- Dates: 15 February 1998 – 23 December 1998
- Champions: Universitario; 22nd Primera División title
- Runner up: Sporting Cristal
- Relegated: Lawn Tennis
- Copa Libertadores: Universitario; Sporting Cristal
- Copa CONMEBOL: Sport Boys
- Copa Merconorte: Alianza Lima; Sporting Cristal; Universitario
- Top goalscorer: Nílson (25 goals)

The 1998 season of the Torneo Descentralizado was the 83rd season of the top category of Peruvian football (soccer). It was played by 12 teams. The national champion was Universitario.

The national championship was divided into two half-year tournaments, the Torneo Apertura and the Torneo Clausura. Each was played on a home-and-away round-robin basis. The winners of each would play for the national title in a playoff. If the same club had won both tournaments, it would have won the national championship automatically.

Following-season Copa Libertadores berths went to the winner of each tournament, while the runners-up played for a Copa CONMEBOL spot. The bottom team on the aggregate table was relegated, while the eleventh place held a relegation/promotion playoff against the winner of the Segunda División (Second Division).

== Teams ==
=== Team changes ===
Promoted from 1997 Segunda División	Promoted from 1997 Copa Perú	Relegated from 1997 Primera División
▲ Lawn Tennis (1st)	▲ Juan Aurich (1st)	▼ Alcides Vigo (11th) ▼ Atlético Torino (12th) ▼ José Gálvez (13th) ▼ La Loretana (14th)

=== Stadia locations ===
Locations of the 1998 Primera División teams

Team	City	Stadium	Capacity
Alianza Atlético	Sullana	Campeones del 36	8,000
Alianza Lima	Lima	Alejandro Villanueva	35,000
Cienciano	Cuzco	Garcilaso	42,056
Deportivo Municipal	Lima	Nacional	45,750
Deprotivo Pesquero	Chimbote	Manuel Rivera Sanchez	25,000
Juan Aurich	Chiclayo	Elías Aguirre	24,500
Lawn Tennis	Lima	Nacional	45,750
Melgar	Arequipa	Mariano Melgar	20,000
Sport Boys	Callao	Miguel Grau	18,000
Sporting Cristal	Lima	San Martín de Porres	17,000
Unión Minas	Cerro de Pasco	Daniel Alcides Carrión	8,000
Universitario	Lima	Teodoro Lolo Fernández	15,000

== Torneo Apertura ==
=== Standings ===
Pos	Team	Pld	W	D	L	GF	GA	GD	Pts	Qualification
1	Universitario	22	11	10	1	40	18	+22	43	Copa Libertadores 1999 First stage
2	Sport Boys	22	11	6	5	38	23	+15	39	1999 Copa CONMEBOL playoff
3	Sporting Cristal	22	10	7	5	40	20	+20	37	
4	Unión Minas	22	11	4	7	33	29	+4	37	
5	Deportivo Pesquero	22	9	6	7	35	21	+14	33	
6	Alianza Lima	22	9	6	7	35	21	+14	33	
7	Juan Aurich	22	7	8	7	27	25	+2	29	
8	Alianza Atlético	22	6	8	8	33	26	+7	26	
9	Cienciano	22	6	7	9	24	27	−3	25	
10	Melgar	22	7	2	13	20	36	−16	23	
11	Deportivo Municipal	22	6	4	12	23	48	−25	22	
12	Lawn Tennis	22	3	2	17	16	49	−33	11	

Updated to match(es) played on July 1998. Source: https://www.rsssf.org/tablesp/peru98.html
Rules for classification: 1) points; 2) goal difference; 3) number of goals scored.

=== Results ===
Home \ Away	AAS	ALI	CIE	MUN	PES	JA	LTF	MEL	SBA	CRI	MIN	UNI
Alianza Atlético		4–2	3–3	3–1	2–3	2–2	1–1	4–1	1–0	1–3	3–3	0–0
Alianza Lima	1–0		2–0	7–0	0–1	2–1	3–0	2–0	3–0	0–0	6–0	0–0
Cienciano	1–0	4–0		0–0	3–1	1–0	1–2	2–0	0–0	2–1	0–0	1–1
Deportivo Municipal	0–1	2–0	1–1		2–4	1–0	3–0	2–1	1–3	0–3	2–3	2–2
Deportivo Pesquero	3–1	2–2	3–0	2–1		1–3	3–0	3–1	1–1	0–0	1–0	0–0
Juan Aurich	2–1	2–2	1–1	1–2	0–0		2–1	2–0	1–0	1–1	4–0	1–1
Lawn Tennis	1–2	0–1	1–0	0–1	1–2	0–1		1–2	1–2	0–4	2–0	0–5
Melgar	2–1	1–0	2–1	4–0	0–0	0–0	2–1		0–1	2–0	1–2	0–1
Sport Boys	2–2	0–0	3–1	5–0	4–0	3–1	3–3	1–0		1–0	4–1	3–3
Sporting Cristal	0–0	1–1	3–2	3–0	2–1	2–2	5–0	7–1	1–0		2–1	1–1
Unión Minas	0–0	1–0	2–0	3–0	4–1	1–0	4–1	2–0	2–0	2–0		1–1
Universitario	5–1	2–1	1–0	2–2	2–1	3–0	2–0	3–0	1–2	2–1	2–1	

Updated to match(es) played on 1998. Source: RSSSF Peru 1998
Legend: Blue = home team win; Yellow = draw; Red = away team win.

== Torneo Clausura ==
=== Standings ===
Pos	Team	Pld	W	D	L	GF	GA	GD	Pts	Qualification
1	Sporting Cristal (A, O)	22	13	3	6	41	23	+18	42	Copa Libertadores 1999 First stage
2	Alianza Lima (A)	22	11	9	2	35	17	+18	42	1999 Copa CONMEBOL playoff
3	Sport Boys	22	12	6	4	24	12	+12	42	
4	Universitario	22	8	10	4	32	22	+10	34	
5	Cienciano	22	7	9	6	23	20	+3	29 (Note: Cienciano were docked 1 points for fielding 4 foreign players in Round 3.)	
6	Deportivo Pesquero	22	7	8	7	20	20	0	29	
7	Melgar	22	8	5	9	26	33	−7	29	
8	Juan Aurich	22	6	8	8	24	27	−3	26	
9	Alianza Atlético	22	6	6	10	24	30	−6	24	
10	Unión Minas	22	6	6	10	22	30	−8	24	
11	Lawn Tennis	22	6	4	12	20	38	−18	22	
12	Deportivo Municipal	22	3	4	15	24	43	−19	13	

Updated to match(es) played on December 1998. Source: https://www.rsssf.org/tablesp/peru98.html
Rules for classification: 1) points; 2) goal difference; 3) number of goals scored.
(A) Advance to a further round; (O) Play-off winners

=== Results ===
Home \ Away	AAS	ALI	CIE	MUN	PES	JA	LTF	MEL	SBA	CRI	MIN	UNI
Alianza Atlético		1–1	2–0	2–0	0–0	1–1	2–1	2–2	0–0	2–3	3–0	1–1
Alianza Lima	4–2		4–1	2–1	2–1	2–1	1–1	2–0	3–1	0–2	0–0	1–0
Cienciano	2–0	0–0		4–1	2–0	1–0	4–0	0–0	0–0	2–1	0–0	0–0
Deportivo Municipal	0–1	1–1	1–2		0–3	1–1	1–2	5–1	0–1	2–1	2–3	1–1
Deportivo Pesquero	2–0	0–0	0–0	2–1		2–1	0–1	0–0	0–0	1–1	3–0	2–2
Juan Aurich	2–0	0–0	2–2	1–1	1–0		4–1	3–2	0–4	2–1	2–1	1–1
Lawn Tennis	2–0	1–5	2–0	0–2	1–2	0–0		2–1	0–1	1–1	3–1	0–2
Melgar	2–1	1–2	3–2	1–0	2–0	1–0	3–1		2–0	0–1	3–1	0–3
Sport Boys	1–0	0–0	2–0	2–0	2–0	1–0	0–0	3–0		2–0	2–1	1–1
Sporting Cristal	3–2	1–1	1–0	7–2	0–1	3–1	2–1	3–0	2–0		4–2	2–0
Unión Minas	0–1	2–1	0–0	2–1	3–0	1–1	2–0	0–0	0–1	1–0		2–2
Universitario	3–1	0–3	1–1	3–1	1–1	1–0	4–0	2–2	3–0	0–2	1–0	

Updated to match(es) played on 1998. Source: RSSSF Peru 1998
Legend: Blue = home team win; Yellow = draw; Red = away team win.

=== Clausura title play-off ===
16 December 1998
20:00

Sporting Cristal	1–0	Alianza Lima
Andrés Mendoza 42'

Estadio Nacional, Lima
Attendance: 40,698
Referee: Gilberto Hidalgo
Sporting Cristal Clausura 1998 winners
To Copa Libertadores 1999
(Alianza Lima to Copa CONMEBOL playoff)

== Copa CONMEBOL play-off ==
20 December 1998
11:30

Sport Boys	0–1	Alianza Lima
		Juan Saavedra 74'

Estadio Miguel Grau, Callao
Attendance: 800
Referee: Juan Mondoñedo
22 December 1998
15:30

Alianza Lima	2–0	Sport Boys
Carlos Basombrío 6'; Facundo Gareca 29'

Estadio Alejandro Villanueva, Lima
Attendance: 1,500
Referee: Francisco Núñez
Alianza Lima to 1999 Copa CONMEBOL
(Alianza Lima later declined their spot in favor of Sport Boys)

== Title play-off ==
20 December 1998
15:30

Sporting Cristal	2–1	Universitario
Nilson Esidio 30'; Andrés Mendoza 40'		Luis Guadalupe 62'

Estadio Nacional, Lima
Attendance: 28,809
Referee: (Uruguay) Gustavo Méndez
23 December 1998
20:00

Universitario	2–1	Sporting Cristal
Roberto Farfán 41' 55'		Andrés Mendoza 74'
Penalties
Gustavo Grondona (penalty scored); César Casas (penalty missed); Gustavo Falaschi (penalty scored); Luis Guadalupe (penalty scored); Eduardo Esidio (penalty scored)	4–2	Javier Ferreira (penalty scored); Jorge Soto (penalty missed); Roger Serrano (penalty scored); Germán Carty (penalty missed)

Estadio Nacional, Lima
Attendance: 38,459
Referee: (Uruguay) José Luis da Rosa

== Aggregate table ==
Pos	Team	Pld	W	D	L	GF	GA	GD	Pts	Qualification or relegation
1	Sport Boys	44	23	12	9	62	35	+27	81	1999 Copa CONMEBOL
2	Sporting Cristal	44	23	10	11	81	43	+38	79	1999 Copa Libertadores and 1999 Copa Merconorte
3	Universitario (C)	44	19	20	5	72	40	+32	77	1999 Copa Libertadores and 1999 Copa Merconorte
4	Alianza Lima	44	20	15	9	70	38	+32	75	1999 Copa Merconorte
5	Deportivo Pesquero	44	16	14	14	53	49	+4	62	
6	Unión Minas	44	17	10	17	55	60	−5	61	
7	Juan Aurich	44	13	16	15	51	52	−1	55	
8	Cienciano	44	13	16	15	47	47	0	54 (Note: Cienciano were docked 1 points for fielding 4 foreign players in Round 3.)	
9	Melgar	44	15	7	22	46	69	−23	52	
10	Alianza Atlético	44	12	14	18	57	66	−9	50	
11	Deportivo Municipal (O)	44	9	8	27	47	91	−44	35	Qualification for Promotion/relegation play-off
12	Lawn Tennis (R)	44	9	6	29	36	87	−51	33	Relegation to 1999 Segunda División

Updated to match(es) played on December, 1999. Source:
Rules for classification: 1) points; 2) goal difference; 3) number of goals scored.
(C) Champions; (O) Play-off winners; (R) Relegated

== Promotion/relegation play-off ==
The promotion/relegation play-off was a two-legged series played by the team placing 11th in the 1998 Primera División, Deportivo Municipal and the 1998 Segunda División champion Hijos de Yurimaguas.

20 December 1998
15:00

Deportivo Municipal	4–1 (a.e.t.)	Hijos de Yurimaguas
Ronald Baroni 34' 100' 113'; Paolo Maldonado 119'		Benjamín Rodríguez 64'

Estadio Nacional, Lima
Attendance: 5,000
Referee: José Arana
Deportivo Municipal remained in Primera División

== Top scorers ==
25 goals

- Nelson Esidio (Sporting Cristal)

19 goals

- Martín Reyes (Juan Aurich)

17 goals

- Roberto Farfán (Universitario)
- Sergio Ibarra (Sport Boys)

16 goals

- Andrés Gonzales (Deportivo Pesquero)
- Jorge Soto (Sporting Cristal)

== See also ==
- 1998 Peruvian Segunda División
- 1998 Copa Perú
