= 1997 Torneo Descentralizado =

Torneo Descentralizado
- Season: 1997
- Dates: 23 February 1997 – 8 November 1997
- Champions: Alianza Lima; 18th Primera División title
- Relegated: Alcides Vigo; Atlético Torino; José Gálvez; La Loretana
- Copa Libertadores: Alianza Lima (first stage); Sporting Cristal (first stage)
- Copa CONMEBOL: Melgar
- Copa Merconorte: Alianza Lima; Sporting Cristal; Universitario
- Top goalscorer: Ricardo Zegarra (17 goals)
- Biggest home win: Alianza Atlético 8–1 Unión Minas; Alianza Atlético 8–1 La Loretana
- Biggest away win: Municipal 1–6 Sporting Cristal; Torino 0–5 Alianza Lima
- Highest scoring: Alianza Atlético 8–1 Unión Minas; Alianza Atlético 8–1 La Loretana; Alianza Lima 5–4 Sporting Cristal

The 1997 Torneo Descentralizado was the 82nd season of the top category of Peruvian football (soccer). It was played by 14 teams. The national champion was Alianza Lima, their first title in 19 years.

== Competition modus ==
The national championship was divided into two half-year tournaments, the Torneo Apertura and the Torneo Clausura. Each was played on a round-robin basis. The winners of each would play for the national title in a playoff. However, since the same club won both tournaments, it won the national championship automatically.

Following-season Copa Libertadores berths went to the champion, as well as to the winner of a Liguilla (small league) featuring teams between second and seventh place on the aggregate table. This had a round-robin format, with the team obtaining the best results in matchups during the "regular season" playing at home. The runner-up would qualify for the Copa CONMEBOL. The bottom four teams on the aggregate table were relegated.

== Teams ==
=== Team changes ===
Promoted from 1996 Segunda División	Promoted from 1996 Copa Perú	Relegated from 1996 Primera División
▲ Alcides Vigo (1st)	▲ José Gálvez (1st)	▼ Aurich–Cañaña (13th) ▼ Ciclista Lima (14th) ▼ Guardia Republicana (15th) ▼ San Agustín (16th)

=== Stadia locations ===
Locations of the 1997 Primera División teams

Team	City	Stadium	Capacity
Alcides Vigo	Lima	Nacional	45,750
Alianza Atlético	Sullana	Campeones del 36	8,000
Alianza Lima	Lima	Alejandro Villanueva	35,000
Atlético Torino	Talara	Campeonísimo	8,000
Cienciano	Cuzco	Garcilaso	42,056
Deportivo Municipal	Lima	Nacional	45,750
Deportivo Pesquero	Chimbote	Manuel Rivera Sanchez	25,000
José Gálvez	Chimbote	Manuel Rivera Sanchez	25,000
La Loretana	Pucallpa	Aliardo Soria	15,000
Melgar	Arequipa	Mariano Melgar	20,000
Sport Boys	Callao	Miguel Grau	18,000
Sporting Cristal	Lima	San Martín de Porres	18,000
Unión Minas	Cerro de Pasco	Daniel Alcides Carrión	8,000
Universitario	Lima	Teodoro Lolo Fernández	15,000

== Torneo Apertura ==
=== Standings ===
Pos	Team	Pld	W	D	L	GF	GA	GD	Pts	Qualification
1	Alianza Lima	13	9	3	1	27	9	+18	30	Copa Libertadores 1998 Group Stage
2	Sporting Cristal	13	8	3	2	30	13	+17	27	
3	Universitario	13	7	4	2	19	8	+11	25	
4	Cienciano	13	6	6	1	18	10	+8	24	
5	Deportivo Municipal	13	6	2	5	25	23	+2	20	
6	Sport Boys	13	5	3	5	15	18	−3	18	
7	Alianza Atlético	13	4	3	6	22	18	+4	15	
8	Deportivo Pesquero	13	3	5	5	16	16	0	14	
9	Melgar	13	4	2	7	16	24	−8	14	
10	Atlético Torino	13	2	7	4	14	19	−5	13	
11	Alcides Vigo	13	3	3	7	13	18	−5	12	
12	Unión Minas	13	3	3	7	14	28	−14	12	
13	José Gálvez	13	3	3	7	12	28	−16	12	
14	La Loretana	13	2	5	6	9	18	−9	11	

Updated to match(es) played on February 27, 2009. Source: RSSSF Peru 1997
Rules for classification: 1) points; 2) goal difference; 3) number of goals scored.

=== Results ===
Home \ Away	AVI	AAS	ALI	TOR	CIE	MUN	PES	GAL	LOR	MEL	SBA	CRI	MIN	UNI
Alcides Vigo				0–0		2–0	1–2	0–1				1–3	3–2	
Alianza Atlético	1–0			1–2		2–2	3–1				1–2		8–1	1–1
Alianza Lima	0–0	2–1		3–1					4–0			5–4	0–0	1–0
Atlético Torino					0–0	2–3			1–1	1–1	2–1			1–1
Cienciano	2–1	2–0	0–0				2–2				2–0	0–0		
Deportivo Municipal			2–0		1–2			5–0		3–1		1–6	4–0	1–2
Deportivo Pesquero			0–3	0–0		4–0			1–1	4–1		0–0		0–1
José Gálvez		2–1	0–4	1–1	1–2		1–1			3–2				
La Loretana	0–2	1–1			0–0	1–2		2–1			0–0	1–2	2–1	
Melgar	5–2	0–1	0–2		1–1				2–0				2–1	
Sport Boys	2–1		1–3			1–1	2–1	2–1		0–1			1–1	3–2
Sporting Cristal		2–1		4–2				6–0		1–0	2–0			
Unión Minas				3–1	2–4		1–0	2–1				0–0		0–2
Universitario	0–0				2–1			0–0	1–0	5–0		2–0		

Updated to match(es) played on 1997. Source: RSSSF Peru 1997
Legend: Blue = home team win; Yellow = draw; Red = away team win.

== Torneo Clausura ==
=== Standings ===
Pos	Team	Pld	W	D	L	GF	GA	GD	Pts	Qualification
1	Alianza Lima	13	10	2	1	33	7	+26	32	Copa Libertadores 1998 Group Stage
2	Universitario	13	8	4	1	19	7	+12	28	
3	Sporting Cristal	13	6	4	3	25	16	+9	22	
4	Alianza Atlético	13	6	3	4	24	13	+11	21	
5	Melgar	13	6	3	4	17	16	+1	21	
6	Cienciano	13	6	2	5	17	13	+4	20	
7	Unión Minas	13	6	2	5	15	15	0	20	
8	Deportivo Municipal	13	6	1	6	18	24	−6	19	
9	Deportivo Pesquero	13	4	3	6	17	16	+1	15	
10	Sport Boys	13	3	6	4	13	15	−2	15	
11	Alcides Vigo	13	3	4	6	19	23	−4	13	
12	Atlético Torino	13	3	1	9	13	30	−17	10	
13	José Gálvez	13	3	0	10	12	27	−15	9	
14	La Loretana	13	2	3	8	10	30	−20	9	

Updated to match(es) played on February 27, 2009. Source: RSSSF Peru 1997
Rules for classification: 1) points; 2) goal difference; 3) number of goals scored.

=== Results ===
Home \ Away	AVI	AAS	ALI	TOR	CIE	MUN	PES	GAL	LOR	MEL	SBA	CRI	MIN	UNI
Alcides Vigo		0–1	1–3		1–0				0–0	3–1	1–1			0–1
Alianza Atlético			0–2		3–1			4–0	8–1	0–1		2–2		
Alianza Lima					2–0	4–0	2–1	4–0		5–0	2–2			0–0
Atlético Torino	2–5	0–2	0–5				2–1	1–0				1–1	3–1	
Cienciano				2–1		3–0		3–1	4–0	0–0			1–2	1–0
Deportivo Municipal	4–3	2–1		2–0			1–3		2–0		2–0			
Deportivo Pesquero	4–1	1–2			0–0			3–1			1–1		1–0	
José Gálvez	4–2					0–2			3–0		1–2	1–2	1–0	0–1
La Loretana			0–1	3–1			1–1			2–1				1–1
Melgar				3–1		2–0	1–0	3–0			1–1	1–0		2–2
Sport Boys		0–0		2–0	1–2				2–1			1–1		
Sporting Cristal	1–1		2–3		2–0	3–2	3–1		4–1				4–1	0–1
Unión Minas	1–1	0–0	1–0			4–0			2–0	2–1	1–0			
Universitario		3–1		3–1		1–1	1–0				2–0		3–0	

Updated to match(es) played on 1997. Source: RSSSF Peru 1997
Legend: Blue = home team win; Yellow = draw; Red = away team win.

== Finals ==
No finals were held after Alianza Lima won both the Apertura and Clausura tournaments, thus automatically obtaining the national title.

== Aggregate table ==
Pos	Team	Pld	W	D	L	GF	GA	GD	Pts	Qualification or relegation
1	Alianza Lima (C)	26	19	5	2	60	16	+44	62	Qualification for 1998 Copa Libertadores and 1998 Copa Merconorte
2	Universitario	26	15	8	3	49	15	+34	53	Qualification for Liguilla Pre-Libertadores
3	Sporting Cristal	26	14	7	5	55	29	+26	49	Qualification for Liguilla Pre-Libertadores
4	Cienciano	26	12	8	6	35	23	+12	44	Qualification for Liguilla Pre-Libertadores
5	Deportivo Municipal	26	12	3	11	43	47	−4	39	Qualification for Liguilla Pre-Libertadores
6	Alianza Atlético	26	10	6	10	46	31	+15	36	Qualification for Liguilla Pre-Libertadores
7	Melgar	26	10	5	11	33	40	−7	35	Qualification for Liguilla Pre-Libertadores
8	Sport Boys	26	8	9	9	28	33	−5	33	
9	Unión Minas	26	9	5	12	29	43	−14	32	
10	Deportivo Pesquero	26	7	8	11	33	32	+1	29	
11	Alcides Vigo (R)	26	6	7	13	32	41	−9	25	Relegation to 1998 Segunda División
12	Atlético Torino (R)	26	5	8	13	27	49	−22	23	Relegation to 1998 Copa Perú
13	José Gálvez (R)	26	6	3	17	24	55	−31	21	Relegation to 1998 Copa Perú
14	La Loretana (R)	26	4	8	14	19	48	−29	20	Relegation to 1998 Copa Perú

Updated to match(es) played on December 1997. Source:
Rules for classification: 1) points; 2) goal difference; 3) number of goals scored.
(C) Champions; (R) Relegated

== Liguilla Pre-Libertadores ==
=== Standings ===
Pos	Team	Pld	W	D	L	GF	GA	GD	Pts	Qualification or relegation	SC	UNI	MEL	CIE	AAS	MUN
1	Sporting Cristal	5	4	1	0	9	1	+8	13	1998 Copa Libertadores and 1998 Copa Merconorte			3–0	1–0	2–1	3–0
2	Universitario	5	2	2	1	12	4	+8	8	1998 Copa Merconorte	0–0		0–0		4–0	7–1
3	Melgar	5	2	2	1	4	4	0	8	1998 Copa CONMEBOL						
4	Cienciano	5	2	0	3	8	10	−2	6			3–1	0–2			3–2
5	Alianza Atlético	5	1	2	2	8	11	−3	5				1–1	4–2		
6	Deportivo Municipal	5	0	1	4	5	16	−11	1				0–1		2–2	

Updated to match(es) played on December 1997. Source: 1997
Legend: Blue = home team win; Yellow = draw; Red = away team win.
Rules for classification: 1) points; 2) goal difference; 3) number of goals scored.

=== Results ===
23 November 1997	Sporting Cristal	3–0	Melgar	Estadio San Martín de Porres, Lima
11:30	Luis Bonnet 31'; Erick Torres 66'; Roger Serrano 73'			Attendance: 5,133; Referee: Alberto Tejada

23 November 1997	Alianza Atlético	4–2	Cienciano	Estadio Campeones del 36, Sullana
13:00	Pedro Prado 36'; Aldo Olcese 57' 60'; Ricardo Zegarra 63'		Nestor Márquez 52'; Carlos Guido 81'	Attendance: 2,834; Referee: José Arana

23 November 1997	Universitario	7–1	Deportivo Municipal	Estadio Nacional, Lima
15:30	Roberto Farfán 3' 53' 70'; César Charún 35'; Guido Alvarenga 37'; Rafael Gallardo 65'; Daniel Navarro 89'		Gustavo Tempo 61'	Attendance: 4,336; Referee: Luis Seminario

29 November 1997	Universitario	0–0	Melgar	Estadio Nacional, Lima
16:00				Attendance: 6,824; Referee: José Arana

30 November 1997	Deportivo Municipal	2–2	Alianza Atlético	Estadio San Martín de Porres, Lima
11:30	Juan Guzmán 37'; Sergio Ibarra 58'		Aldo Olcese 45'; Pedro Prado 86'	Attendance: 5,340; Referee: Alberto Tejada

30 November 1997	Sporting Cristal	1–0	Cienciano	Estadio San Martín de Porres, Lima
13:00	Jorge Soto 63'			Referee: Luis Seminario

6 December 1997	Sporting Cristal	0–0	Universitario	Estadio Nacional, Lima
15:45				Attendance: 13,669; Referee: Alberto tejada

7 December 1997	Alianza Atlético	1–1	Melgar	Estadio Campeones del 36, Sullana
13:00	Wilfredo Begazo 51'		Oscar Pacheco 77'	Attendance: 2,642; Referee: Jorge Torres

7 December 1997	Cienciano	3–2	Deportivo Municipal	Estadio Garcilaso, Cusco
15:20	Manuel Earl 8' (o.g.); Néstor Márquez 27' 74'		Sergio Ibarra 25'; Juan Guzmán 56'	Attendance: 2,064; Referee: Ángel Ziani

13 December 1997	Sporting Cristal	3–0	Deportivo Municipal	Estadio San Martín de Porres, Lima
15:45	Marcelo Asteggiano 39'; Miguel Rebosio 79'; Annor Aziz 86'			Attendance: 3,287; Referee: José Arana

13 December 1997	Universitario	4–0	Alianza Atlético	Estadio Nacional, Lima
15:45	Giuliano Portilla 6'; Roberto Farfán 12'; César Charún 42'; Marko Ciurlizza 68'			Attendance: 2,621; Referee: Luis Seminario

14 December 1997	Cienciano	0–2	Melgar	Estadio Garcilaso, Cusco
15:20			Frank Palomino 68'; Pedro Valdivia 89'	Attendance: 3,705; Referee: César Córdova

20 December 1997	Cienciano	3–1	Universitario	Estadio Garcilaso, Cusco
15:30	Juan Saavedra 51'; Néstor Márquez 59'; Percy Aguilar 68'		César Charún 67'	Referee: José Arana

20 December 1997	Deportivo Municipal	0–1	Melgar	Estadio Nacional, Lima
15:30			Wilfredo Begazo 46'	Attendance: 102; Referee: Jorge Torres

20 December 1997	Sporting Cristal	2–1	Alianza Atlético	Estadio San Martín de Porres, Lima
15:30	Erick Torres 10'; Jorge Soto 21'		Aldo Olcese 66'	Attendance: 4,968; Referee: César Córdova

== See also ==
- 1997 Peruvian Segunda División
- 1997 Copa Perú

== Top scorers ==
Source: RSSSF

17 goals

- (Peru) Ricardo Zegarra (Alianza Atlético)
