= 1986 Torneo Descentralizado =

Torneo Descentralizado
- Season: 1986
- Dates: 14 June 1986 – 21 February 1987
- Champions: San Agustín (1st title)
- Runner up: Alianza Lima
- Relegated: Guardia Republicana; León de Huánuco; Los Espartanos; Mariscal Nieto
- Copa Libertadores: San Agustín; Alianza Lima
- Top goalscorer: Juvenal Briceño (16 goals)

The 1986 Torneo Descentralizado, the top category of Peruvian football (soccer), was played by 30 teams. The season started in 1986 but ended in early 1987. The national champion was first-time winner San Agustín.

== Format ==
The national championship was divided into two tournaments; the Torneo Regional and Torneo Descentralizado. The winners of each tournament faced off in the season final and received the berths for the 1987 Copa Libertadores. The Torneo Regional divided the teams into four groups; Metropolitan, North, Central, and South. Each group had its teams advance to the Liguilla Regional, the Torneo Descentralizado and the División Intermedia. The Liguilla Regional determined the Regional champion. The Descentralizado divided the teams in three groups and the top two in each group advanced to the Descentralizado Liguilla which decided the Descentralizado champion. The División Intermedia was a promotion/relegation tournament between first and second division teams. Teams received two points for a win and one point for a draw. No points were awarded for a loss.

== Teams ==
=== Team changes ===
Promoted from 1985 Copa Perú	Promoted from 1985 División Intermedia	Relegated from 1985 Primera División (1985 División Intermedia)
▲ Hungaritos Agustinos (1st)	▲ Guardia Republicana (Liguilla - 1st) ▲ Atlético Grau (Zona Norte - 1st) ▲ Unión Minas (Zona Centro - 2nd) ▲ Mariscal Nieto (Zona Sur - 2nd)	▼ Atlético Chalaco (Liguilla - 4th) ▼ Sport Pilsen (Zona Norte - 4th) ▼ José Gálvez (Zona Norte - 5th) ▼ Chanchamayo (Zona Centro - 6th) ▼ Diablos Rojos (Zona Sur - Liguilla)

=== Stadia locations ===
Locations of the 1986 Primera División teams

Team	City	Stadium	Capacity	Field
Alfonso Ugarte	Puno	Enrique Torres Belón	20,000	Grass
Alianza Lima	La Victoria, Lima	Alejandro Villanueva	35,000	Grass
ADT	Tarma	Unión Tarma	9,000	Grass
Atlético Grau	Piura	Miguel Grau (Piura)	25,000	Grass
Atlético Huracán	Moquegua	25 de Noviembre	25,000	Grass
Atlético Torino	Talara	Campeonísimo	8,000	Grass
Carlos A. Mannucci	Trujillo	Mansiche	24,000	Grass
Cienciano	Cusco	Garcilaso	42,056	Grass
CNI	Iquitos	Max Augustín	24,000	Grass
Coronel Bolognesi	Tacna	Jorge Basadre	19,850	Grass
Defensor ANDA	Aucayacu	Municipal de Aucayacu	5,000	Grass
Deportivo Pucallpa	Pucallpa	Aliardo Soria Pérez	15,000	Grass
Deportivo Junín	Huancayo	Huancayo	20,000	Grass
Deportivo Municipal	Cercado de Lima	Nacional	45,750	Grass
Guardia Republicana	La Molina, Lima	Nacional	45,750	Grass
Hungaritos Agustinos	Iquitos	Max Augustín	24,000	Grass
Juventud La Joya	Chancay	Rómulo Shaw Cisneros	13,000	Grass
Juventud La Palma	Huacho	Segundo Aranda Torres	12,000	Grass
León de Huánuco	Huánuco	Heraclio Tapia	15,000	Grass
Los Espartanos	Pacasmayo	Carlos A. Olivares	2,000	Grass
Mariscal Nieto	Ilo	Mariscal Nieto	8,000	Grass
Melgar	Arequipa	Mariano Melgar	20,000	Grass
Octavio Espinosa	Ica	José Picasso Peratta	8,000	Grass
San Agustín	San Isidro, Lima	Nacional	45,750	Grass
Sport Boys	Callao	Miguel Grau	15,000	Grass
Sporting Cristal	Rímac, Lima	Nacional	45,750	Grass
Unión Huaral	Huaral	Julio Lores Colan	10,000	Grass
Unión Minas	Cerro de Pasco	Daniel Alcides Carrión	8,000	Grass
UTC	Cajamarca	Héroes de San Ramón	18,000	Grass
Universitario	Breña, Lima	Teodoro Lolo Fernández	15,000	Grass

== Torneo Regional ==
=== Zona Metropolitana ===
Pos	Team	Pld	W	D	L	GF	GA	GD	Pts	Qualification or relegation	CRI	ALI	AGU	MUN	UNI	OCT	JLP	HUA	SBA	JOY	GRE	CNI
1	Sporting Cristal	22	12	9	1	34	17	+17	33	Liguilla Regional and Torneo Descentralizado		3–2	3–2	1–1	0–1	0–0	2–1	3–2	1–0	3–1	0–0	4–0
2	Alianza Lima	22	12	4	6	30	14	+16	28	Liguilla Regional and Torneo Descentralizado	1–1		1–0	2–0	4–0	2–1	2–0	3–0	1–1	1–0	0–1	3–1
3	San Agustín	22	12	4	6	30	20	+10	28	Liguilla Regional and Torneo Descentralizado	1–2	0–2		0–0	1–0	1–0	2–0	1–2	1–2	3–1	2–1	1–0
4	Deportivo Municipal	22	12	3	7	33	21	+12	27	Liguilla Regional and Torneo Descentralizado	0–1	3–1	2–3		0–1	1–2	2–0	5–1	1–0	4–1	2–2	2–0
5	Universitario	22	9	8	5	24	19	+5	26	Torneo Descentralizado	1–1	0–0	0–0	1–2		0–0	2–1	1–2	2–1	1–1	2–0	4–1
6	Octavio Espinosa	22	8	7	7	17	16	+1	23	Torneo Descentralizado	1–1	1–0	1–1	1–2	1–1		0–2	1–1	1–0	1–0	1–0	2–0
7	Juventud La Palma	22	8	5	9	25	30	−5	21	Qualification playoff	0–3	0–2	1–1	1–0	2–1	1–0		1–1	2–3	2–1	4–3	2–2
8	Unión Huaral	22	6	6	10	24	30	−6	18	Qualification playoff	1–1	1–0	1–2	1–2	0–1	1–2	0–1		2–0	1–1	0–1	0–0
9	Sport Boys	22	6	6	10	21	29	−8	18	Qualification playoff	0–1	0–1	0–3	2–0	1–3	0–0	2–0	1–4		1–1	1–1	1–1
10	Juventud La Joya	22	4	7	11	21	30	−9	15	1986 División Intermedia	1–2	1–0	1–2	0–1	0–0	1–0	0–0	2–3	1–1		2–0	3–0
11	Guardia Republicana	22	5	5	12	17	29	−12	15	1986 División Intermedia	1–1	0–2	0–2	0–1	0–1	0–1	0–3	0–0	1–2	2–0		2–1
12	CNI	22	2	8	12	14	35	−21	12	1986 División Intermedia	0–0	0–0	0–1	0–2	1–1	1–0	1–1	1–0	1–2	2–2	1–2	

Legend: Blue = home team win; Yellow = draw; Red = away team win.

=== Zona Norte ===
Pos	Team	Pld	W	D	L	GF	GA	GD	Pts	Qualification or relegation
1	UTC	15	10	2	3	31	11	+20	22	Liguilla Regional and Torneo Descentralizado
2	Hungaritos Agustinos	15	7	4	4	20	14	+6	18	Liguilla Regional and Torneo Descentralizado
3	Atlético Grau	15	4	8	3	8	13	−5	16	Torneo Descentralizado
4	Los Espartanos	15	4	5	6	14	23	−9	13	Qualification playoff
5	Carlos A. Mannucci	15	3	6	6	9	16	−7	12	1986 División Intermedia
6	Atlético Torino	15	3	3	9	17	22	−5	9	1986 División Intermedia

==== Results ====
===== Matches 1–10 =====
Home \ Away	GRA	TOR	CAM	HUN	LEP	UTC
Atlético Grau		2–0	0–0	2–0	0–0	1–0
Atlético Torino	0–0		3–0	3–0	1–1	1–2
Carlos A. Mannucci	0–0	1–2		1–1	2–1	1–1
Hungaritos Agustinos	0–0	2–1	1–0		4–1	0–0
Los Espartanos	0–0	2–1	0–1	2–1		3–2
UTC	7–0	1–0	3–0	1–0	5–1	

Updated to match(es) played on unknown. Source:
Legend: Blue = home team win; Yellow = draw; Red = away team win.

===== Matches 11–15 =====
Home \ Away	GRA	TOR	CAM	HUN	LEP	UTC
Atlético Grau		1–1	1–0	1–4	0–0	
Atlético Torino			1–3	1–2		
Carlos A. Mannucci					0–0	
Hungaritos Agustinos			0–0		3–0	
Los Espartanos		2–1				
UTC	1–0	3–1	2–0	1–2	2–1	

Updated to match(es) played on unknown. Source:
Legend: Blue = home team win; Yellow = draw; Red = away team win.

=== Zona Centro ===
Pos	Team	Pld	W	D	L	GF	GA	GD	Pts	Qualification or relegation
1	Deportivo Pucallpa	15	9	2	4	20	14	+6	20	Liguilla Regional and Torneo Descentralizado
2	ADT	15	7	4	4	21	13	+8	18	Liguilla Regional and Torneo Descentralizado
3	Defensor ANDA	15	7	3	5	18	18	0	17	Torneo Descentralizado
4	Unión Minas	15	5	6	4	18	16	+2	16	Qualification playoff
5	León de Huánuco	15	3	4	8	12	19	−7	10	1986 División Intermedia
6	Deportivo Junín	15	2	5	8	8	17	−9	9	1986 División Intermedia

==== Results ====
===== Matches 1–10 =====
Home \ Away	ADT	AND	JUN	PUC	LEO	UMI
ADT		2–1	1–1	1–0	1–1	2–1
Defensor ANDA	2–1		0–2	0–1	3–1	1–1
Deportivo Junín	0–2	2–0		0–2	1–1	0–0
Deportivo Pucallpa	1–1	1–2	3–1		4–1	2–1
León de Huánuco	1–0	1–2	2–0	0–1		1–2
Unión Minas	1–1	4–1	3–1	0–1	1–1	

Updated to match(es) played on unknown. Source:
Legend: Blue = home team win; Yellow = draw; Red = away team win.

===== Matches 11–15 =====
Home \ Away	ADT	AND	JUN	PUC	LEO	UMI
ADT			1–0	4–0		3–0
Defensor ANDA	3–1			1–0	1–0	
Deportivo Junín		0–0				
Deportivo Pucallpa			1–0		2–1	
León de Huánuco	1–0		0–0			
Unión Minas		1–1	1–0	1–1	1–0	

Updated to match(es) played on unknown. Source:
Legend: Blue = home team win; Yellow = draw; Red = away team win.

=== Zona Sur ===
Pos	Team	Pld	W	D	L	GF	GA	GD	Pts	Qualification or relegation
1	Melgar	15	12	2	1	24	6	+18	26	Liguilla Regional and Torneo Descentralizado
2	Cienciano	15	6	4	5	20	16	+4	16	Liguilla Regional and Torneo Descentralizado
3	Coronel Bolognesi	15	5	5	5	17	15	+2	15	Liguilla Regional and Torneo Descentralizado
4	Alfonso Ugarte	15	4	7	4	15	15	0	15	Qualification play-offs
5	Mariscal Nieto	15	3	4	8	8	12	−4	10	1986 División Intermedia
6	Atlético Huracán	15	1	6	8	7	27	−20	8	1986 División Intermedia

==== Results ====
===== Matches 1–10 =====
Home \ Away	ALF	HUR	CIE	BOL	NIE	MEL
Alfonso Ugarte		4–0	1–1	2–1	1–0	0–0
Atlético Huracán	1–1		0–2	0–2	0–0	0–0
Cienciano	0–0	1–1		1–0	2–1	0–1
Coronel Bolognesi	2–2	1–1	0–0		2–1	0–1
Mariscal Nieto	2–0	1–1	1–0	0–1		1–0
Melgar	3–0	2–0	4–2	1–0	1–0	

Updated to match(es) played on unknown. Source:
Legend: Blue = home team win; Yellow = draw; Red = away team win.

===== Matches 11–15 =====
Home \ Away	ALF	HUR	CIE	BOL	NIE	MEL
Alfonso Ugarte		3–0		0–0		
Atlético Huracán				1–3	1–0	
Cienciano	3–0	4–1		2–3	2–1	
Coronel Bolognesi					0–0	
Mariscal Nieto	0–0					0–1
Melgar	2–1	3–0	2–0	3–2		

Updated to match(es) played on unknown. Source:
Legend: Blue = home team win; Yellow = draw; Red = away team win.

=== Qualification playoffs ===
The winners advanced to the Torneo Descentralizado.

Team 1	Agg.	Team 2	1st leg	2nd leg
Sport Boys	1–1 (8–7 p)	Los Espartanos	0–0	1–1
Unión Minas	5–4 (3–2 p)	Unión Huaral	1–4	4–0
Juventud La Palma	1–3 (3–2 p)	Alfonso Ugarte	1–0	0–3

==== First leg ====
23 October 1986	Unión Huaral	4–1	Unión Minas	Estadio Julio Lores Colán, Huaral
15:30	Carlos Vico Leyva 21'; Miguel Ángel Elguera 40'; Luis Redher 77'; Lizandro Navarro 83'		Camargo 25'	Attendance: 1,368; Referee: Samuel Alarcón

23 October 1986	Juventud La Palma	1–0	Alfonso Ugarte	Estadio Segundo Aranda Torres, Huacho
15:30	Raúl Hurtado 61'			Attendance: 1,317; Referee: José Ramírez

23 October 1986	Sport Boys	0–0	Los Espartanos	Estadio Nacional, Lima
19:00				Referee: Sergio Leiblinger

==== Second leg ====
26 October 1986	Los Espartanos	1–1 (7–8 p)	Sport Boys	Estadio Carlos A. Olivares, Pacasmayo
16:00	Santiago Ramos 76'		Miguel Muchotrigo 13'	Referee: César Pagano
	Penalties
	Carlos Carbonell (penalty scored); Rubén Medina (penalty scored); José Serrano (penalty scored); Manuel Vera (penalty scored); Salomón Paredes (penalty scored); Carlos Sanguinez (penalty scored); Edilberto Carrasco (penalty missed)		José Castillo (penalty scored); Carlos Palacios (penalty scored); Félix Putriano (penalty scored); Víctor Clavijo (penalty scored); César Avilés (penalty scored); Damaso Rodríguez (penalty scored); Pedro Vilca (penalty scored)

26 October 1986	Unión Minas	3–0 (3–2 p)	Unión Huaral	Estadio Daniel Alcides Carrión, Cerro de Pasco
	César Del Águila; César Dávila; Eduardo Zapata			Referee: Alfonso Postigo
	Penalties
	César Del Águila (penalty scored); Julio Rosell (penalty scored); Víctor Sotelo (penalty missed); Luis Rojas (penalty missed); Luis Solano (penalty scored)		Humberto Rey Muñoz (penalty missed); Luis Redher (penalty scored); José Elguera (penalty missed); José Leyva (penalty missed); Pedro Ruiz (penalty scored)

26 October 1986	Alfonso Ugarte	3–0 (2–3 p)	Juventud La Palma	Estadio Enrique Torres Belón, Puno
	Vargas 15'; Cánepa 39'; Toledo
	Penalties
	Fernández (penalty missed); Cánepa (penalty missed); Salguero (penalty missed); Fernández (penalty scored); Toledo (penalty scored)		José Suárez (penalty scored); Wilson Ramírez (penalty scored); Jorge Ramírez (penalty missed); Pedro Meza (penalty scored); José Carranza (penalty missed)

* Sport Boys, Juventud La Palma and Unión Minas qualified for the Torneo Descentralizado. Meanwhile, Alfonso Ugarte, Los Espartanos and Unión Huaral were relegated to the 1986 División Intermedia, where they had to defend their places against teams from the Segunda División and the Copa Perú.

=== Liguilla Regional ===
The four group winners and the second placed team in the Metropolitan group qualified directly to the quarter-finals. The remaining qualified teams started in the preliminary round to determine the 3 remaining quarter-finalists. Numbers in parentheses indicate a penalty shootout result. The Regional winner qualified to the 1987 Copa Libertadores and advanced to the Final of the season.

Preliminary round
3M	San Agustín	1
3S	Coronel Bolognesi	0
2S	Cienciano	0
4M	Deportivo Municipal	4
2C	ADT	0
2N	Hungaritos Agustinos	2

Quarter-finals
1C	Deportivo Pucallpa	0
3M	San Agustín	3
1S	Melgar	0 (3)
4M	Deportivo Municipal (p)	0 (4)
2M	Alianza Lima (p)	0 (4)
2N	Hungaritos Agustinos	0 (2)
1M	Sporting Cristal	0 (0)
1N	UTC (p)	0 (3)

Semi-finals
3M	San Agustín (p)	0 (4)
4M	Deportivo Municipal	0 (3)
2M	Alianza Lima (p)	0 (4)
1N	UTC	0 (3)

Final
3M	San Agustín (p)	1 (3)
2M	Alianza Lima	1 (1)

==== Preliminary Round ====
22 October 1986	Hungaritos Agustinos	2–0	ADT	Estadio Nacional, Lima
15:00	Oscar Calvo 65'; Selene da Silva 88'			Referee: Miguel Piña

22 October 1986	San Agustín	0–1*	Coronel Bolognesi	Estadio Nacional, Lima
17:00			Juan Ayala 83'	Referee: Enrique Labó

* After hearing the arguments presented by the delegates of San Agustín and Coronel Bolognesi, the ADFP Justice Commission ruled that the match had to be replayed. San Agustín had previously lodged a protest, claiming a 3–0 victory by walkover (W.O.) because the Tacna-based side had failed to arrive in time for the scheduled kickoff due to a delay in its flight's arrival.

22 October 1986	Deportivo Municipal	4–0	Cienciano	Estadio Nacional, Lima
19:00	Alberto Eugenio 6' 36' 62'; Eduardo Saavedra 47'			Attendance: 3,618; Referee: César Pagano

===== Replay =====
24 October 1986	San Agustín	1–0	Coronel Bolognesi	Estadio Nacional, Lima
	José Ziani 29'			Referee: Alberto Tejada

==== Quarterfinals ====
25 October 1986	Alianza Lima	0–0 (4–2 p)	Hungaritos Agustinos	Estadio Nacional, Lima
15:30				Attendance: 4,778; Referee: Julio Arévalo
	Penalties
	Juan Illescas (penalty scored); César Sussoni (penalty scored); Eugenio La Rosa (penalty scored); Tomás Farfán (penalty scored)		Oscar Calvo (penalty scored); Rojas (penalty scored); Selene da Silva (penalty missed); Víctor Bustamante (penalty missed)

26 October 1986	San Agustín	3–0	Deportivo Pucallpa	Estadio Nacional, Lima
12:00	José Pajuelo 51'; José Ziani 74'; Roberto Martínez 83'			Referee: José Ramírez

26 October 1986	Deportivo Municipal	0–0 (4–3 p)	Melgar	Estadio Nacional, Lima
14:00				Referee: Enrique Labó
	Penalties
	César Adriazola (penalty scored); Oswaldo Flores (penalty scored); Eduardo Saavedra (penalty scored); Cedric Vásquez (penalty scored)		Juvenal Briceño (penalty missed); Orlando Vera (penalty scored); Juan Sánchez (penalty scored); Víctor Gutierrez (penalty scored); Víctor Concha (penalty missed)

26 October 1986	UTC	0–0 (3–0 p)	Sporting Cristal	Estadio Nacional, Lima
16:00				Attendance: 7,905; Referee: José Salas
	Penalties
	José Mansilla (penalty scored); Marco Portilla (penalty scored); Leoncio Cervera (penalty scored)		Genaro Neyra (penalty missed); Roberto Arrelucea (penalty missed); David Zuluaga (penalty missed)

==== Semifinals ====
29 October 1986	San Agustín	0–0 (4–3 p)	Deportivo Municipal	Estadio Nacional, Lima
18:00				Referee: César Pagano
	Penalties
	Roberto Martínez (penalty scored); Carlos Castro (penalty scored); José Ziani (penalty scored); Jaime Duarte (penalty scored)		Oswaldo Flores (penalty scored); Eduardo Saavedra (penalty scored); Raúl Obando (penalty scored); César Adriazola (penalty missed); Marco Morán (penalty missed)

29 October 1986	Alianza Lima	0–0 (4–3 p)	UTC	Estadio Nacional, Lima
20:00				Referee: Carlos Montalván
	Penalties
	Juan Illescas (penalty scored); César Sussoni (penalty scored); Eugenio La Rosa (penalty scored); Juan Reynoso (penalty scored)		Armando Portilla (penalty scored); Leoncio Cervera (penalty scored); Segundo Cruz (penalty missed); Luis Mansilla (penalty scored); Jesús Sánchez (penalty scored)

==== Final ====
2 November 1986

San Agustín	1–1	Alianza Lima
Roberto Martínez 68'		Eugenio La Rpsa 70'
Penalties
Roberto Martínez (penalty scored); Raúl Mejía (penalty scored); José Ziani (penalty missed); Carlos Castro (penalty scored)	3–1	Juan Illescas (penalty scored); Juan Reynoso (penalty missed); Eugenio La Rosa (penalty missed); Wilmar Valencia (penalty missed)

Estadio Nacional, Lima
Attendance: 25,135
Referee: Samuel Alarcón

== Torneo Descentralizado ==
The top two of each group advanced to the Liguilla Final.

=== Group A ===
Pos	Team	Pld	W	D	L	GF	GA	GD	Pts	Qualification or relegation	ALI	UTC	UNI	PAL	ADT	BOL
1	Alianza Lima	10	6	2	2	25	6	+19	14	Liguilla Final		6–1	5–1	5–0	2–0	4–0
2	UTC	10	6	1	3	14	14	0	13	Liguilla Final	1–1		2–0	2–0	3–1	3–1
3	Universitario	10	5	2	3	14	10	+4	12		1–2	3–0		3–0	3–0	1–1
4	Juventud La Palma	10	3	2	5	7	15	−8	8		1–0	0–0	0–0		2–0	2–1
5	ADT	10	3	2	5	8	14	−6	8		0–0	2–2	0–1	2–1		2–0
6	Coronel Bolognesi	10	2	1	7	6	16	−10	5		1–0	0–1	0–1	2–1	0–1	

Legend: Blue = home team win; Yellow = draw; Red = away team win.

=== Group B ===
Pos	Team	Pld	W	D	L	GF	GA	GD	Pts	Qualification or relegation	MUN	AGU	MEL	UMI	HUN	AND
1	Deportivo Municipal	10	5	3	2	19	9	+10	13	Liguilla Final		1–1	2–1	3–1	1–1	0–0
2	San Agustín	10	4	5	1	11	4	+7	13	Liguilla Final	0–1		1–1	2–0	4–0	1–1
3	Melgar	10	4	3	3	13	7	+6	11		2–1	0–1		3–0	0–2	5–0
4	Unión Minas	10	3	2	5	10	12	−2	8		2–0	0–0	0–0		3–0	4–1
5	Hungaritos Agustinos	9	3	1	5	7	15	−8	7		1–5	0–1	0–1	2–0		W.O.
6	Defensor ANDA	9	1	4	4	5	18	−13	6		0–5	0–0	0–0	1–0	1–2	

Legend: Blue = home team win; Yellow = draw; Red = away team win.

=== Group C ===
Pos	Team	Pld	W	D	L	GF	GA	GD	Pts	Qualification or relegation	CRI	SBA	GRA	OCT	CIE	PUC
1	Sporting Cristal	10	5	3	2	13	6	+7	13	Liguilla Final		0–0	2–0	1–0	4–0	2–0
2	Sport Boys	10	3	6	1	12	10	+2	12	Liguilla Final	0–0		0–0	1–1	3–2	2–0
3	Atlético Grau	10	3	4	3	13	11	+2	10		0–0	1–1		2–1	2–0	2–0
4	Octavio Espinosa	10	2	5	3	17	13	+4	9		3–1	2–2	3–3		1–1	5–0
5	Cienciano	10	3	2	5	11	18	−7	8		3–1	1–2	1–0	1–0		2–2
6	Deportivo Pucallpa	10	3	2	5	12	20	−8	8		0–2	3–1	3–2	1–1	3–1	

Legend: Blue = home team win; Yellow = draw; Red = away team win.

=== Liguilla Final ===
==== Standings ====
Pos	Team	Pld	W	D	L	GF	GA	GD	Pts	Qualification or relegation	ALI	AGU	MUN	SBA	CRI	UTC
1	Alianza Lima	5	4	1	0	9	1	+8	9	1987 Copa Libertadores			2–0	2–0	3–0	
2	San Agustín	5	3	0	2	6	3	+3	6		0–1		2–1			2–0
3	Deportivo Municipal	5	2	1	2	9	7	+2	5						3–0	3–1
4	Sport Boys	5	2	1	2	7	8	−1	5			0–2	2–2			4–2
5	Sporting Cristal	5	2	0	3	5	7	−2	4			1–0		0–1		
6	UTC	5	0	1	4	4	14	−10	1		1–1				0–4	

Legend: Blue = home team win; Yellow = draw; Red = away team win.

==== Results ====
1 February 1987	Sporting Cristal	1–0	San Agustín	Estadio Nacional, Lima
16:00	Julio César Antón 16'			Referee: José Ramírez

1 February 1987	Deportivo Municipal	3–1	UTC	Estadio Nacional, Lima
18:00	Alberto Eugenio 42'; Eduardo Saavedra 48'; Wilfredo Quevedo		José Anselmo Soto 44'	Referee: César Pagano

1 February 1987	Alianza Lima	2–0	Sport Boys	Estadio Nacional, Lima
20:00	Wilmar Valencia 9'; Juan Carlos Illescas 49'			Referee: Carlos Montalván

4 February 1987	UTC	0–4	Sporting Cristal	Estadio Nacional, Lima
16:00			Julio César Antón 68' (pen.); Francisco Manassero 60' 65'	Referee: Alfonso Postigo

4 February 1987	Sport Boys	2–2	Deportivo Municipal	Estadio Nacional, Lima
18:00	César Torres; Mitzu Alvez 64'		Eduardo Saavedra 47'; Javier Carmen	Referee: César Cachay

4 February 1987	San Agustín	0–1	Alianza Lima	Estadio Nacional, Lima
20:00			Benjamín Rodríguez 40'	Referee: Samuel Alarcón

7 February 1987	Sport Boys	0–2	San Agustín	Estadio Nacional, Lima
16:00			Roberto Martínez 10'; José Pajuelo 77'

7 February 1987	UTC	1–1	Alianza Lima	Estadio Nacional, Lima
18:00	José Anselmo Soto 86'		Carlos Bustamante 27'

7 February 1987	Deportivo Municipal	3–0	Sporting Cristal	Estadio Nacional, Lima
20:00	Eduardo Saavedra 12' 21'; Oswaldo Flores 65'			Attendance: 11,144

11 February 1987	San Agustín	2–0	UTC	Estadio Nacional, Lima
16:00	Rigoberto Montoya 60'; Ismael Montesinos 80'

11 February 1987	Sporting Cristal	0–1	Sport Boys	Estadio Nacional, Lima
18:00			Wilkin Cavero 84'

11 February 1987	Alianza Lima	2–0	Deportivo Municipal	Estadio Nacional, Lima
20:00	Juan Carlos Illescas 10'; Wilmar Valencia 30'			Attendance: 40,040; Referee: Samuel Alarcón

15 February 1987	Sport Boys	4–2	UTC	Estadio Nacional, Lima
16:00	Miguel Muchotrigo 56'; Wilkin Cavero 57'; Carlos Avilés 67' 74'		José Anselmo Soto 50'

15 February 1987	San Agustín	2–1	Deportivo Municipal	Estadio Nacional, Lima
18:00	Ismael Montesinos 20'; José Ziani 49'		Alberto Eugenio 88'	Referee: César Pagano

15 February 1987	Alianza Lima	3–0	Sporting Cristal	Estadio Nacional, Lima
20:00	Benjamín Rodríguez 4' 43'; Gino Peña 60'			Attendance: 12,532; Referee: Carlos Montalván

== Title play-off ==
21 February 1987
20:00

San Agustín	1–0	Alianza Lima
José Pajuelo 15'

Estadio Nacional, Lima
Attendance: 35,317
Referee: Samuel Alarcón

== Topscorer ==
16 goals

- (Peru) Juvenal Briceño (FBC Melgar)

== See also ==
- 1986 Copa Perú
