= 1985 Torneo Descentralizado =

Torneo Descentralizado
- Season: 1985
- Dates: 2 March 1985 – 6 April 1986
- Champions: Universitario
- Runner up: UTC
- Relegated: Atlético Chalaco; Chanchamayo; Diablos Rojos; José Gálvez; Sport Pilsen
- Copa Libertadores: Universitario; UTC
- Top goalscorer: Genaro Neyra (22 goals)

The 1985 Torneo Descentralizado, the top category of Peruvian football, was played by 30 teams. The national champion was Universitario.

== Format ==
The national championship was divided into two tournaments; the Torneo Regional and Torneo Descentralizado. The winners of each tournament faced off in the season final and received the berths for the 1986 Copa Libertadores. The Torneo Regional divided the teams into four groups; Metropolitan, North, Central, and South. Each group had its teams advance to the Liguilla Regional, the Torneo Descentralizado and the División Intermedia. The Liguilla Regional determined the Regional champion which advanced to the Descentralizado with a bonus point. The Descentralizado, consisting of 16 teams from the Torneo Regional, had each team play the others twice (a double round robin system) for a total of 30 games. The team that placed last in this tournament played a relegation playoff. The División Intermedia was a promotion/relegation tournament between first and second division teams. Teams received two points for a win and one point for a draw. No points were awarded for a loss.

== Teams ==
=== Team changes ===
Promoted from 1984 Copa Perú	Promoted from 1984 División Intermedia	Relegated from 1984 Primera División (1984 División Intermedia)
▲ Los Espartanos (1st)	▲ Juventud La Joya (Intermedia A - 4th) ▲ San Agustín (Liguilla - 1st) ▲ León de Huánuco (Zona Centro - 1st) ▲ Deportivo COOPTRIP (Zona Centro - 4th) ▲ Atlético Huracán (Zona Sur - 3rd)	▼ Deportivo Hospital (Zona Centro - 5th)

=== Stadia locations ===
Locations of the 1985 Primera División teams

Team	City	Stadium	Capacity	Field
Alfonso Ugarte	Puno	Enrique Torres Belón	20,000	Grass
Alianza Lima	La Victoria, Lima	Alejandro Villanueva	35,000	Grass
ADT	Tarma	Unión Tarma	9,000	Grass
Atlético Chalaco	Callao	Miguel Grau	15,000	Grass
Atlético Huracán	Moquegua	25 de Noviembre	25,000	Grass
Atlético Torino	Talara	Campeonísimo	8,000	Grass
Carlos A. Mannucci	Trujillo	Mansiche	24,000	Grass
Chanchamayo	Chanchamayo	Municipal de Chanchamayo	5,000	Grass
Cienciano	Cusco	Garcilaso	42,056	Grass
CNI	Iquitos	Max Augustín	24,000	Grass
Coronel Bolognesi	Tacna	Jorge Basadre	19,850	Grass
Defensor ANDA	Aucayacu	Municipal de Aucayacu	5,000	Grass
Deportivo COOPTRIP	Pucallpa	Aliardo Soria Pérez	15,000	Grass
Deportivo Municipal	Cercado de Lima	Nacional	45,750	Grass
Diablos Rojos	Juliaca	Enrique Torres Belón	20,000	Grass
Huancayo	Huancayo	Huancayo	20,000	Grass
José Gálvez	Chimbote	Manuel Rivera Sanchez	25,000	Grass
Juventud La Joya	Chancay	Rómulo Shaw Cisneros	13,000	Grass
Juventud La Palma	Huacho	Segundo Aranda Torres	12,000	Grass
León de Huánuco	Huánuco	Heraclio Tapia	15,000	Grass
Los Espartanos	Pacasmayo	Carlos A. Olivares	2,000	Grass
Melgar	Arequipa	Mariano Melgar	20,000	Grass
Octavio Espinosa	Ica	José Picasso Peratta	8,000	Grass
San Agustín	San Isidro, Lima	Nacional	45,750	Grass
Sport Boys	Callao	Miguel Grau	15,000	Grass
Sport Pilsen	Guadalupe	Guadalupe	5,000	Grass
Sporting Cristal	Rímac, Lima	Nacional	45,750	Grass
Unión Huaral	Huaral	Julio Lores Colan	10,000	Grass
UTC	Cajamarca	Héroes de San Ramón	18,000	Grass
Universitario	Breña, Lima	Nacional	45,750	Grass

== Torneo Regional ==
=== Zona Metropolitana ===
Pos	Team	Pld	W	D	L	GF	GA	GD	Pts	Qualification or relegation	ALI	MUN	CNI	UNI	OCT	CRI	SBA	JLJ	HUA	JLP	AGU	CHA
1	Alianza Lima	22	12	7	3	30	14	+16	31 (Note: Alianza Lima advanced directly to the semifinals of the Torneo Regional.)	Torneo Descentralizado, Liguilla Regional		3–0	2–0	1–0	2–1	1–1	2–1	0–0	3–2	0–0	0–0	3–0
2	Deportivo Municipal	22	12	5	5	32	24	+8	29	Torneo Descentralizado, Liguilla Regional	0–2		2–0	1–0	3–0	3–1	2–1	3–1	2–1	0–0	0–2	1–0
3	CNI	22	9	8	5	28	21	+7	26	Torneo Descentralizado, Liguilla Regional	2–0	5–0		2–1	1–1	2–1	2–2	2–0	1–0	1–0	1–1	3–0
4	Universitario	22	6	12	4	20	15	+5	24	Torneo Descentralizado, Liguilla Regional	3–0	0–3	0–0		0–0	1–1	1–1	2–0	3–0	1–0	2–2	0–0
5	Octavio Espinosa	22	7	9	6	17	21	−4	23	Torneo Descentralizado	1–0	1–0	2–0	0–0		1–2	0–0	0–0	1–0	0–2	W.O.	1–0
6	Sporting Cristal	22	6	9	7	26	25	+1	21	Torneo Descentralizado	0–0	0–0	4–1	1–2	1–1		1–2	0–1	0–0	2–0	4–2	2–0
7	Sport Boys	22	5	11	6	25	28	−3	21	Torneo Descentralizado	0–4	2–2	0–2	1–1	3–0	2–3		1–0	0–0	1–1	1–1	3–0
8	Juventud La Joya	22	6	9	7	22	25	−3	21	Qualification/Relegation play-off	0–2	1–1	1–1	1–1	1–1	1–1	5–2		1–1	3–2	0–1	3–0
9	Unión Huaral	22	4	12	6	24	25	−1	20	1985 División Intermedia	0–0	2–2	2–0	0–0	2–2	1–0	1–1	3–0		2–1	2–2	1–2
10	Juventud La Palma	22	3	13	6	19	20	−1	19	1985 División Intermedia	1–1	1–2	1–1	0–0	1–1	0–0	0–0	1–1	1–1		2–2	1–0
11	San Agustín	22	3	12	7	26	28	−2	18 (Note: In Matchday 5, the match between Octavio Espinosa and San Agustín ended in a 1–1 draw. However, San Agustín had five players sent off, so under the regulations, the match was awarded as a loss to San Agustín.)	1985 División Intermedia	1–2	1–3	1–1	1–1	1–2	3–0	0–1	0–1	2–2	1–1		2–2
12	Atlético Chalaco	22	2	7	13	9	32	−23	11	1985 División Intermedia	1–2	0–2	0–0	0–1	2–1	1–1	0–0	0–1	1–1	0–3	0–0	

Legend: Blue = home team win; Yellow = draw; Red = away team win.

=== Zona Norte ===
Pos	Team	Pld	W	D	L	GF	GA	GD	Pts	Qualification or relegation
1	Carlos A. Mannucci	15	7	6	2	22	10	+12	20	Torneo Descentralizado, Liguilla Regional
2	Los Espartanos	15	6	4	5	18	14	+4	16	Torneo Descentralizado
3	UTC	15	4	8	3	11	11	0	16	Torneo Descentralizado
4	Sport Pilsen	15	5	6	4	11	11	0	16	1985 División Intermedia
5	José Gálvez	15	4	4	7	12	19	−7	12	1985 División Intermedia
6	Atlético Torino	15	4	2	9	16	25	−9	10	1985 División Intermedia

==== Results ====
===== Matches 1–10 =====
Home \ Away	TOR	CAM	JGÁ	LEP	SPC	UTC
Atlético Torino		0–3	1–0	3–4	3–2	2–1
Carlos A. Mannucci	1–0		4–2	1–1	4–0	1–1
José Gálvez	1–0	1–0		1–0	0–0	1–1
Los Espartanos	1–2	0–2	3–1		1–0	0–1
Sport Pilsen	1–0	1–1	0–0	1–0		0–0
UTC	1–1	0–0	1–0	0–0	0–1	

Updated to match(es) played on unknown. Source:
Legend: Blue = home team win; Yellow = draw; Red = away team win.

===== Matches 11–15 =====
Home \ Away	TOR	CAM	JGÁ	LEP	SPC	UTC
Atlético Torino						2–3
Carlos A. Mannucci	1–1		2–1	1–2	1–0	0–0
José Gálvez	4–1				0–0	
Los Espartanos	1–0		4–0			
Sport Pilsen	1–0			1–1		3–0
UTC			2–0	0–0		

Updated to match(es) played on unknown. Source:
Legend: Blue = home team win; Yellow = draw; Red = away team win.

==== Tiebreaker ====
3 July 1985	UTC	1–0	Sport Pilsen	Estadio Mansiche, Trujillo
	Enrique Moreno 34'			Attendance: 610; Referee: Edison Pérez

=== Zona Centro ===
Pos	Team	Pld	W	D	L	GF	GA	GD	Pts	Qualification or relegation
1	ADT	15	8	4	3	21	11	+10	20	Torneo Descentralizado, Liguilla Regional
2	Huancayo	15	6	3	6	13	13	0	15	Torneo Descentralizado
3	Deportivo COOPTRIP	15	5	5	5	11	13	−2	15	Qualification/Relegation play-off
4	Defensor ANDA	15	4	6	5	11	11	0	14	1985 División Intermedia
5	León de Huánuco	15	3	7	5	14	14	0	13	1985 División Intermedia
6	Chanchamayo	15	4	5	6	13	21	−8	13	1985 División Intermedia

==== Results ====
===== Matches 1–10 =====
Home \ Away	ADT	CHA	AND	COO	HUA	LEÓ
ADT		3–2	1–0	1–0	0–1	3–2
Chanchamayo	2–2		1–1	1–0	1–0	2–2
Defensor ANDA	0–0	2–0		0–0	1–0	1–0
Deportivo COOPTRIP	0–2	1–0	3–1		1–0	0–0
Huancayo	0–3	3–1	1–0	4–1		1–1
León de Huánuco	0–1	4–0	1–1	1–0	0–0	

Updated to match(es) played on unknown. Source: Diario La Crónica 1985
Legend: Blue = home team win; Yellow = draw; Red = away team win.

===== Matches 11–15 =====
Home \ Away	ADT	CHA	AND	COO	HUA	LEÓ
ADT		0–1	1–1	0–0	3–0	1–2
Chanchamayo					0–0	
Defensor ANDA		2–0			0–1	0–0
Deportivo COOPTRIP		1–1	2–1		1–0	
Huancayo						
León de Huánuco		0–1		1–1	0–2	

Updated to match(es) played on unknown. Source:
Legend: Blue = home team win; Yellow = draw; Red = away team win.

=== Zona Sur ===
Pos	Team	Pld	W	D	L	GF	GA	GD	Pts	Qualification or relegation
1	Coronel Bolognesi	15	11	2	2	31	8	+23	24	Torneo Descentralizado, Liguilla Regional
2	Melgar	15	10	4	1	25	6	+19	24	Torneo Descentralizado
3	Alfonso Ugarte	15	7	3	5	19	12	+7	17	Torneo Descentralizado
4	Cienciano	15	4	3	8	15	24	−9	11	1985 División Intermedia
5	Atlético Huracán	15	3	4	8	16	28	−12	10	1985 División Intermedia
6	Diablos Rojos	15	1	2	12	7	36	−29	4	1985 División Intermedia

==== Results ====
===== Matches 1–10 =====
Home \ Away	ALF	HUR	BOL	CIE	DRJ	MEL
Alfonso Ugarte		2–0	1–0	3–0	2–0	2–1
Atlético Huracán	1–1		0–3	3–2	1–1	1–2
Coronel Bolognesi	3–0	4–2		6–0	2–0	0–3
Cienciano	0–0	4–0	0–1		2–0	0–0
Diablos Rojos	0–0	1–5	0–1	2–1		1–2
Melgar	1–0	2–1	0–0	1–0	4–0	

Updated to match(es) played on unknown. Source:
Legend: Blue = home team win; Yellow = draw; Red = away team win.

===== Matches 11–15 =====
Home \ Away	ALF	HUR	BOL	CIE	DRJ	MEL
Alfonso Ugarte		2–0			6–0	
Atlético Huracán						
Coronel Bolognesi	2–0	3–0		3–2	3–0	0–0
Cienciano	1–0	0–0			4–2	
Diablos Rojos		0–1				
Melgar	3–0	1–1		3–0	2–0	

Updated to match(es) played on unknown. Source:
Legend: Blue = home team win; Yellow = draw; Red = away team win.

=== Qualification/Relegation play-off ===
4 August 1985	Deportivo COOPTRIP	0–2	Juventud La Joya	Estadio Aliardo Soria Pérez, Pucallpa
			Julio César Antón 10' 83'	Attendance: 3,000

11 August 1985	Juventud La Joya	8–0	Deportivo COOPTRIP	Estadio Municipal, Chancay
15:30	Farfán 6' 13'; René Cañamero 8' 80' 88'; Julio César Antón 20' 65' 75'

=== Liguilla Regional ===
Numbers in parentheses indicate penalty shootout result. The Regional winner qualified to the 1986 Copa Libertadores and advanced to the Final of the season. Alianza Lima received a bye to the semi-finals as the Metropolitan zone winner.

Quarter-finals
4 August
Universitario	4
Carlos A. Mannucci	1
4 August
CNI	3
Coronel Bolognesi	1
4 August
Deportivo Municipal	1 (3)
ADT	1 (1)

Semi-finals
8 August – Lima
Universitario	0 (8)
Alianza Lima	0 (7)
8 August
CNI	3
Deportivo Municipal	0

Final
11 August
Universitario	3
CNI	1

==== Quarterfinals ====
4 August 1985	CNI	3–1	Coronel Bolognesi	Estadio Nacional, Lima
14:00	César Adriazola 30'; Wilson Ramírez 54' 83'		Aguilar 34'	Referee: José Ramírez

4 August 1985	Universitario	4–1	Carlos A. Mannucci	Estadio Nacional, Lima
16:00	Juan Carlos Oblitas 17' 35' 77'; Eduardo Rey Muñoz 80'		Carlos Delgado 62'	Referee: César Pagano

4 August 1985	Deportivo Municipal	1–1 (3–1 p)	ADT	Estadio Nacional, Lima
18:00	Eduardo Saavedra 30'		Jesús Solano 65'	Attendance: 3,819; Referee: Carlos Montalván
	Penalties
	Raul Obando (penalty scored); Oswaldo Flores (penalty scored); Eduardo Saavedra (penalty scored); Lizandro Navarro (penalty missed)		Carlos Trillo (penalty scored); César Manrique (penalty missed); Alfredo Bendezú (penalty missed); Israel Quijandría (penalty missed)

==== Semifinals ====
8 August 1985	Deportivo Municipal	0–3	CNI	Estadio Alejandro Villanueva, Lima
18:00			César Adriazola 44' (pen.); Wilson Ramírez 57'; José Carranza 90'	Referee: Enrique Labó

8 August 1985	Alianza Lima	0–0 (7–8 p)	Universitario	Estadio Alejandro Villanueva, Lima
20:00				Attendance: 26,226; Referee: Edison Pérez
	Penalties
	Daniel Reyes (penalty scored); Tomás Farfán (penalty scored); José Casanova (penalty scored); Gino Peña (penalty missed); César Sussoni (penalty scored); Jorge Cordero (penalty scored); Jaime Duarte (penalty scored); Raúl Mejía (penalty scored); Luis Escobar (penalty missed)		Jaime Drago (penalty scored); Eduardo Rey Muñoz (penalty scored); Miguel Seminario (penalty missed); Juan Carlos Oblitas (penalty scored); Hugo Gastulo (penalty scored); Ramón Quiroga (penalty scored); Samuel Eugenio (penalty scored); Leonardo Rojas (penalty scored); Luis Reyna (penalty scored)

==== Final ====
11 August 1985	Universitario	3–1	CNI	Estadio Nacional, Lima
17:00	Javier Chirinos 77'; Jaime Drago 88'; Miguel Seminario 90'		Rino Giordano 43'	Attendance: 20,051; Referee: Carlos Montalván

== Torneo Descentralizado ==
=== First stage ===
==== Standings ====
Pos	Team	Pld	W	D	L	GF	GA	GD	Pts	Qualification or relegation
1	UTC	30	19	8	3	56	27	+29	46	Liguilla Final, Bonus +2
2	Universitario	30	15	9	6	51	25	+26	39	Liguilla Final, Bonus +1
3	Alianza Lima	30	15	9	6	36	18	+18	39	Liguilla Final
4	Deportivo Municipal	30	11	14	5	34	26	+8	36	Liguilla Final
5	Carlos A. Mannucci	30	12	11	7	42	30	+12	35	Liguilla Final
6	Los Espartanos	30	11	13	6	31	20	+11	35	Liguilla Final
7	Melgar	30	9	13	8	49	36	+13	31	
8	CNI	30	11	8	11	39	26	+13	30	
9	Octavio Espinosa	30	10	9	11	30	30	0	29	
10	Sporting Cristal	30	11	5	14	37	43	−6	27	
11	Sport Boys	30	7	12	11	23	32	−9	26	
12	Coronel Bolognesi	30	8	7	15	32	41	−9	23	
13	Huancayo	30	7	9	14	26	41	−15	23	
14	Juventud La Joya	30	8	7	15	34	49	−15	23	
15	ADT	30	8	6	16	24	46	−22	22	
16	Alfonso Ugarte	30	6	4	20	18	72	−54	16	Relegation play-off

==== Results ====
Home \ Away	ADT	ALI	ALF	CAM	CNI	BOL	MUN	HUA	JOY	LEP	MEL	OCT	SBA	CRI	UTC	UNI
ADT		1–1	2–0	0–0	2–3	0–1	0–0	1–0	5–2	0–1	0–3	2–1	1–1	0–1	1–0	1–1
Alianza Lima	3–0		4–1	1–0	2–1	2–1	1–2	1–0	3–1	0–1	2–2	1–0	1–0	2–1	1–1	2–0
Alfonso Ugarte	1–2	0–0		1–0	0–0	1–0	0–0	3–1	1–2	1–0	1–5	0–2	2–1	2–0	0–1	1–1
Carlos A. Mannucci	1–0	1–0	5–0		1–3	1–0	3–1	0–0	1–1	5–2	1–0	1–0	1–0	3–1	3–4	1–1
CNI	6–1	0–0	6–2	2–0		1–0	1–2	0–1	1–1	1–0	0–0	1–0	0–0	3–1	5–0	0–1
Coronel Bolognesi	1–2	0–0	3–0	2–1	1–0		1–0	1–1	2–3	0–2	0–0	2–1	2–1	1–2	1–2	2–2
Deportivo Municipal	3–1	0–0	4–0	1–1	0–0	1–0		1–1	4–2	2–2	2–1	0–0	0–1	2–1	1–1	3–2
Huancayo	0–1	0–1	2–1	2–2	1–0	1–0	0–0		2–0	0–0	3–4	1–1	1–0	1–2	1–1	2–3
Juventud La Joya	3–0	0–1	1–0	1–4	0–1	2–1	0–0	2–1		1–1	1–2	2–0	0–0	2–3	1–1	3–2
Los Espartanos	2–0	0–0	7–0	0–0	1–1	0–0	0–0	2–0	1–0		1–0	0–2	2–1	1–0	0–0	0–0
Melgar	4–0	2–2	5–0	1–1	2–1	2–2	1–1	0–1	1–1	0–0		3–0	0–1	1–3	2–1	0–1
Octavio Espinosa	2–1	1–0	3–0	2–2	1–1	0–0	1–0	1–0	2–0	3–1	1–1		1–1	1–2	1–2	0–0
Sport Boys	1–0	0–4	4–0	2–2	1–0	2–4	0–0	2–1	1–0	0–0	1–1	0–0		1–1	0–0	0–1
Sporting Cristal	0–0	0–1	3–0	0–1	1–0	3–2	0–1	1–1	4–1	0–3	2–2	1–2	1–1		1–2	1–0
UTC	2–0	1–0	4–0	0–0	2–0	3–2	4–1	4–1	2–1	2–0	3–1	3–1	3–0	5–1		1–0
Universitario	2–0	1–0	4–0	2–0	2–1	5–0	1–2	6–0	2–0	1–1	3–3	2–0	3–0	1–0	1–1	

Updated to match(es) played on unknown. Source:
Legend: Blue = home team win; Yellow = draw; Red = away team win.

=== Liguilla Final ===
==== Standings ====
Pos	Team	Pld	W	D	L	GF	GA	GD	BP	Pts	Qualification	UNI	UTC	LEP	ALI	CAM	MUN
1	Universitario (C)	5	5	0	0	20	5	+15	1	11	1986 Copa Libertadores		4–0	4–0			3–0
2	UTC	5	2	2	1	5	7	−2	2	8	1986 Copa Libertadores				1–0	1–0	
3	Los Espartanos	5	2	1	2	4	8	−4	0	5			1–1		1–0	1–3	
4	Alianza Lima	5	1	1	3	6	6	0	0	3		2–3					3–0
5	Carlos A. Mannucci	5	1	1	3	7	11	−4	0	3		3–6			1–1		
6	Deportivo Municipal	5	1	1	3	4	9	−5	0	3			2–2	0–1		2–0	

Legend: Blue = home team win; Yellow = draw; Red = away team win.
(C) Champions

==== Results ====
23 March 1986	Deportivo Municipal	2–0	Carlos A. Mannucci	Estadio Nacional, Lima
14:30	Marco Morán 1'; Alberto Eugenio 47'

23 March 1986	Los Espartanos	1–0	Alianza Lima	Estadio Nacional, Lima
16:30	Carlos Carbonell 26' (pen.)			Referee: Enrique Labó

23 March 1986	Universitario	4–0	UTC	Estadio Nacional, Lima
18:30	Miguel Seminario 13'; Fidel Suárez 27' 46'; Claudio Pedraglio 88'			Attendance: 45,745; Referee: Edison Pérez

26 March 1986	UTC	1–0	Carlos A. Mannucci	Estadio Nacional, Lima
16:00	César La Torre 47'			Referee: Alfonso Postigo

26 March 1986	Deportivo Municipal	0–1	Los Espartanos	Estadio Nacional, Lima
18:00			Rubén Medina 88'

26 March 1986	Alianza Lima	2–3	Universitario	Estadio Nacional, Lima
20:00	Humberto Rey Muñoz 13'; Eugenio La Rosa 29'		Juan Seminario 51' 72'; Jaime Drago 80'	Attendance: 45,745; Referee: César Pagano

30 March 1986	Los Espartanos	1–3	Carlos A. Mannucci	Estadio Nacional, Lima
14:30	Alberto Cano 41'		Carlos Valdez 1'; Andrés Peña 63'; Jorge Jaramillo 88'	Referee: Edison Pérez

30 March 1986	UTC	1–0	Alianza Lima	Estadio Nacional, Lima
16:30	Juan Sánchez 60'

30 March 1986	Universitario	3–0	Deportivo Municipal	Estadio Nacional, Lima
18:30	Fidel Suárez 54' 55'; Miguel Seminario 82'			Attendance: 28,103; Referee: Enrique Labó

2 April 1986	Alianza Lima	3–0	Deportivo Municipal	Estadio Nacional, Lima
16:00	Juan Illescas 18'; Luis Escobar 74' 78'

2 April 1986	Los Espartanos	1–1	UTC	Estadio Nacional, Lima
18:00	Carlos Serrano 70'		Leoncio Cervera 55' (pen.)	Referee: César Pagano

2 April 1986	Carlos A. Mannucci	3–6	Universitario	Estadio Nacional, Lima
20:00	Jorge Jaramillo 29'; Enrique Bazalar 56'; Carlos Valdez 60'		Fidel Suárez 13' 31' 48'; Javier Torres 43' 83'; Leonardo Rojas 87'

6 April 1986	Carlos A. Mannucci	1–1	Alianza Lima	Estadio Nacional, Lima
14:30	Richard Garrido 75'		Juan Illescas 41' (pen.)	Referee: César Pagano

6 April 1986	Deportivo Municipal	2–2	UTC	Estadio Nacional, Lima
16:30	Alberto Eugenio 8' 84'		Benjamín Reyes 31' 70'

6 April 1986	Universitario	4–0	Los Espartanos	Estadio Nacional, Lima
18:30	Eduardo Rey Muñoz 12'; Fidel Suárez 31'; Jaime Drago; Juan Seminario			Attendance: 29,199; Referee: Carlos Montalván

== Relegation play-off ==
1986	Alfonso Ugarte	2–1	Diablos Rojos

Alfonso Ugarte remain in the Primera División.

== Season final ==
Universitario won both tournaments and became the 1985 season champion.

== Top scorers ==
Player	Nationality	Goals	Club
Genaro Neyra	Peru	22	Melgar
Miguel Seminario	Peru	20	Universitario
Armando Portilla	Peru	19	UTC
Juan Illescas	Peru	19	Alianza Lima
Jaime Drago	Peru	19	Universitario
Jesús Torrealva	Peru	17	Octavio Espinosa
Carlos Delgado	Peru	16	Carlos A. Mannucci
Luis Antonio Escobar	Peru	14	Alianza Lima
Fidel Suárez	Peru	14	Universitario
Eugenio La Rosa	Peru	14	Alianza Lima
César Medina	Peru	13	Los Espartanos
Johnny Watson	Peru	13	Sport Boys
Eduardo Saavedra	Peru	12	Deportivo Municipal
Julio César Antón	Peru	12	Juventud La Joya
Eduardo Rey Muñoz	Peru	12	Universitario
Jorge Jaramillo	Peru	11	Carlos A. Mannucci
César Adriazola	Peru	11	CNI

== See also ==
- 1985 Copa Perú
