= 1988 Torneo Descentralizado =

Torneo Descentralizado
- Season: 1988
- Dates: 27 May 1988 – 26 January 1989
- Champions: Sporting Cristal
- Runner up: Universitario
- Relegated: Alianza Naval; Deportivo Pucallpa; Guardia Republicana; Hungaritos Agustinos
- Copa Libertadores: Sporting Cristal; Universitario
- Top goalscorer: Alberto Mora (15 goals)

The 1988 Torneo Descentralizado, the top tier of Peruvian football was played by 37 teams in the format of Regional Tournaments. The national champion was Sporting Cristal.

== Teams ==
=== Team changes ===
Promoted from 1987 Copa Perú	Promoted from 1987 División Intermedia	Relegated from 1987 Primera División (1987 División Intermedia)
▲ Libertad (1st)	▲AELU (Intermedia A - 1st) ▲ Guardia Republicana (Zona Metropolitana - Repechaje) ▲ Alianza Atlético (Zona Norte - 1st) ▲15 de Septiembre (Zona Norte - 3rd) ▲ Juan Aurich (Zona Norte - 4th) ▲ León de Huánuco (Zona Centro - 2nd) ▲ Alipio Ponce (Zona Centro - 3rd) ▲ Alianza Naval (Zona Sur - 2nd) ▲ Diablos Rojos (Zona Sur - 4th) ▲ Deportivo Tintaya (Zona Sur - 5th)	▼ Sport Boys (Intermedia A - 7th) ▼ Juventud La Palma (Zona Metropolitana - Repechaje) ▼ Atlético Torino (Zona Norte - 5th) ▼ Juvenil Los Ángeles (Zona Sur - 5th)

=== Stadia locations ===
Locations of the 1988 Primera División teams

Team	City	Stadium	Capacity
15 de Septiembre	Trujillo	Mansiche	24,000
ADT	Tarma	Unión Tarma	9,000
AELU	Pueblo Libre, Lima	Nacional	45,750
Alfonso Ugarte	Puno	Enrique Torres Belón	20,000
Alianza Atlético	Sullana	Campeones del 36	12,000
Alianza Lima	La Victoria, Lima	Alejandro Villanueva	35,000
Alianza Naval	Mollendo	Municipal de Mollendo	5,000
Alipio Ponce	Mazamari	Municipal de Mazamari	4,000
Atlético Grau	Piura	Miguel Grau (Piura)	25,000
Atlético Huracán	Moquegua	25 de Noviembre	25,000
Carlos A. Mannucci	Trujillo	Mansiche	24,000
Cienciano	Cusco	Garcilaso	42,056
CNI	Iquitos	Max Augustín	24,000
Coronel Bolognesi	Tacna	Jorge Basadre	19,850
Defensor ANDA	Aucayacu	Municipal de Aucayacu	5,000
Deportivo Cañaña	Chiclayo	Elías Aguirre	24,500
Deportivo Junín	Huancayo	Huancayo	20,000
Deportivo Municipal	Cercado de Lima	Nacional	45,750
Deportivo Pucallpa	Pucallpa	Aliardo Soria Pérez	15,000
Deportivo Tintaya	Yauri	Manuel Prado de Espinar	10,000
Diablos Rojos	Juliaca	Guillermo Briceño Rosamedina	20,030
Guardia Republicana	Cercado de Lima	Nacional	45,750
Hungaritos Agustinos	Iquitos	Max Augustín	24,000
Internazionale	San Borja, Lima	Nacional	45,750
Juan Aurich	Chiclayo	Elías Aguirre	24,500
La Joya–Iqueño	Chancay	Rómulo Shaw Cisneros	13,000
León de Huánuco	Huánuco	Heraclio Tapia	15,000
Libertad	Trujillo	Mansiche	24,000
Melgar	Arequipa	Mariano Melgar	20,000
Mina San Vicente	Junín, Peru	Municipal de San Ramón	10,000
Octavio Espinosa	Ica	José Picasso Peratta	8,000
San Agustín	San Isidro, Lima	Nacional	45,750
Sporting Cristal	Rímac, Lima	Nacional	45,750
Unión Huaral	Huaral	Julio Lores Colan	10,000
Unión Minas	Cerro de Pasco	Daniel Alcides Carrión	8,000
UTC	Cajamarca	Héroes de San Ramón	18,000
Universitario	Breña, Lima	Nacional	45,750

== Torneo Regional ==
=== Zona Metropolitana ===
==== Group A ====
Pos	Team	Pld	W	D	L	GF	GA	GD	Pts	Qualification or relegation	UNI	AGU	CRI	AELU	CNI	GUA
1	Universitario	12	7	2	3	19	7	+12	16	Torneo Descentralizado "A" and Liguilla Regional		1–1	2–1	0–1	6–1	0–0
2	San Agustín	12	6	4	2	16	13	+3	16	Torneo Descentralizado "A" and Liguilla Regional Play-off	0–2		1–1	2–1	1–0	5–2
3	Sporting Cristal	12	4	5	3	16	13	+3	13	Torneo Descentralizado "A"	0–1	0–0		1–3	2–1	1–1
4	AELU	12	4	3	5	12	14	−2	11	Torneo Descentralizado "B"	0–1	1–2	1–2		1–1	2–1
5	CNI	12	3	4	5	10	15	−5	10	Torneo Descentralizado "B"	1–0	0–0	0–1	1–1		2–0
6	Guardia Republicana	12	0	5	7	9	26	−17	5	11th/12th-place play-off	1–5	1–3	0–4	0–0	2–2	

Legend: Blue = home team win; Yellow = draw; Red = away team win.

==== Group B ====
Pos	Team	Pld	W	D	L	GF	GA	GD	Pts	Qualification or relegation	HUA	OCT	MUN	ALI	JUV	INT
1	Unión Huaral	12	6	5	1	20	10	+10	17	Torneo Descentralizado "A" and Liguilla Regional		1–2	2–0	0–0	1–1	3–0
2	Octavio Espinosa	12	5	5	2	15	12	+3	15	Torneo Descentralizado "A" and Liguilla Regional Play-off	2–2		1–0	1–1	2–1	1–1
3	Deportivo Municipal	12	6	1	5	15	9	+6	13	Torneo Descentralizado "A"	2–3	0–1		1–0	3–0	1–0
4	Alianza Lima	12	5	3	4	10	7	+3	13	Torneo Descentralizado "B"	0–1	1–1	0–1		2–0	1–0
5	Juventud La Joya	12	3	3	6	9	18	−9	9	Torneo Descentralizado "B"	0–2	2–1	0–2	0–2		2–1
6	Internazionale	12	2	2	8	10	17	−7	6	11th/12th-place play-off	0–2	2–2	1–1	1–2	2–0	

Legend: Blue = home team win; Yellow = draw; Red = away team win.

===== Interzonal matches =====
Home	Score	Away
Guardia Republicana	1–1	Juventud La Joya
AELU	1–0	Internazionale
Sporting Cristal	1–1	Unión Huaral
San Agustín	1–0	Deportivo Municipal
Unversitario	0–1	Alianza Lima
CNI	1–0	Octavio Espinosa

Home	Score	Away
Juventud La Joya	1–0	Guardia Republicana
Internazionale	3–0	AELU
Unión Huaral	2–2	Sporting Cristal
Deportivo Municipal	4–0	San Agustín
Alianza Lima	0–1	Unversitario
Octavio Espinosa	1–0	CNI

==== 11th/12th-place play-off ====
17 August 1988	Internazionale	1–0	Guardia Republicana	Estadio Nacional, Lima
17:00	José Muñoz 42'

* Guardia Republicana, having finished bottom of the Metropolitan Zone of the Regional Tournament, had to contest a relegation playoff against the bottom-placed team in the Metropolitan Zone of the Torneo Descentralizado "B" to retain its place in the league.

==== Liguilla Regional Play-off ====
17 August 1988	San Agustín	2–1	Octavio Espinosa	Estadio Nacional, Lima
19:00	Fernando Revilla 12'; José Pajuelo 68'		Nibardo Aguirre 81'	Attendance: 1,176; Referee: César Pagano

=== Zona Norte ===
Pos	Team	Pld	W	D	L	GF	GA	GD	Pts	Qualification or relegation	AAS	UTC	CAM	GRA	CAÑ	LIB	JUA	SET	HUN
1	Alianza Atlético	16	9	6	1	21	9	+12	24	Torneo Descentralizado "A" and Liguilla Regional		3–1	1–0	2–0	2–1	2–1	4–1	0–0	0–0
2	UTC	16	7	5	4	20	13	+7	19	Torneo Descentralizado "A"	0–1		1–0	2–1	1–0	0–0	3–1	2–1	5–0
3	Carlos A. Mannucci	16	6	6	4	14	10	+4	18	Torneo Descentralizado "B"	1–0	1–0		2–2	2–0	1–1	1–0	3–0	0–0
4	Atlético Grau	16	4	7	5	18	15	+3	15	Torneo Descentralizado "B"	0–1	2–2	2–0		1–0	3–0	2–2	3–0	1–1
5	Deportivo Cañaña	16	3	9	4	13	14	−1	15	Torneo Descentralizado "B"	2–2	1–0	1–0	0–0		1–1	0–0	2–2	1–1
6	Libertad	16	3	8	5	11	13	−2	14	Torneo Descentralizado "B"	1–1	0–1	0–1	0–0	0–0		2–1	1–0	3–0
7	Juan Aurich	16	2	9	5	11	16	−5	13	Torneo Descentralizado "B"	0–0	0–0	0–0	0–0	0–0	0–0		1–1	3–1
8	15 de Setiembre	16	3	7	6	15	23	−8	13	Torneo Descentralizado "B"	1–2	1–1	1–1	1–0	2–2	0–0	2–1		2–0
9	Hungaritos Agustinos	16	3	7	6	13	23	−10	13	Torneo Descentralizado "B"	0–0	1–1	1–1	2–1	0–2	2–1	0–1	4–1	

Legend: Blue = home team win; Yellow = draw; Red = away team win.

=== Zona Centro ===
Pos	Team	Pld	W	D	L	GF	GA	GD	Pts	Qualification or relegation	JUN	MSV	UMI	LEO	ADT	PUC	APM	AND
1	Deportivo Junín	14	6	6	2	21	12	+9	18	Torneo Descentralizado "A" and Liguilla Regional		2–2	1–1	1–1	1–0	2–0	4–1	3–0
2	Mina San Vicente	14	6	6	2	15	8	+7	18	Torneo Descentralizado "A"	0–0		2–2	2–0	3–1	1–0	0–0	2–0
3	Unión Minas	14	6	5	3	18	13	+5	17	Torneo Descentralizado "B"	1–1	1–0		3–1	1–0	2–0	4–2	1–0
4	León de Huánuco	14	5	4	5	11	15	−4	14	Torneo Descentralizado "B"	0–0	1–0	1–1		1–0	2–1	0–0	1–0
5	ADT	14	4	5	5	13	13	0	13	Torneo Descentralizado "B"	1–2	0–0	1–1	2–1		3–1	1–1	2–0
6	Deportivo Pucallpa	14	5	3	6	10	14	−4	13	Torneo Descentralizado "B"	1–0	1–0	2–1	1–0	1–2		1–1	1–0
7	Alipio Ponce	14	1	8	5	10	17	−7	10	Torneo Descentralizado "B"	3–4	0–1	0–0	0–1	0–0	0–0		1–0
8	Defensor ANDA	14	3	3	8	8	14	−6	9	Torneo Descentralizado "B"	1–0	0–1	2–0	4–1	0–0	0–0	1–1	

Legend: Blue = home team win; Yellow = draw; Red = away team win.

=== Zona Sur ===
Pos	Team	Pld	W	D	L	GF	GA	GD	Pts	Qualification or relegation	CIE	MEL	COR	ALF	TIN	DRJ	HUR	ANM
1	Cienciano	14	10	2	2	30	9	+21	22	Torneo Descentralizado "A" and Liguilla Regional		2–0	2–1	2–0	2–2	2–1	6–0	6–1
2	Melgar	14	10	1	3	33	15	+18	21	Torneo Descentralizado "A"	0–2		2–1	1–0	7–1	2–1	1–0	7–2
3	Coronel Bolognesi	14	8	2	4	22	13	+9	18	Torneo Descentralizado "B"	2–1	2–1		1–0	2–0	4–0	0–0	2–0
4	Alfonso Ugarte	14	5	4	5	13	11	+2	14	Torneo Descentralizado "B"	1–0	1–2	2–0		2–2	1–0	1–0	3–0
5	Deportivo Tintaya	14	3	4	7	18	31	−13	10	Torneo Descentralizado "B"	1–1	0–4	1–3	0–0		1–0	4–0	3–1
6	Diablos Rojos	14	4	1	9	12	20	−8	9	Torneo Descentralizado "B"	0–1	0–2	0–1	1–0	3–2		1–0	3–0
7	Atlético Huracán	14	3	3	8	14	24	−10	9	Torneo Descentralizado "B"	0–1	1–2	3–3	1–1	3–0	3–1		2–0
8	Alianza Naval	14	3	3	8	15	34	−19	9	Torneo Descentralizado "B"	0–2	2–2	1–0	1–1	3–1	1–1	3–1	

Legend: Blue = home team win; Yellow = draw; Red = away team win.

=== Liguilla Regional ===
==== Standings ====
Pos	Team	Pld	W	D	L	GF	GA	GD	Pts	Qualification or relegation	UNI	HUA	AAS	JUN	AGU	CIE
1	Universitario	5	3	2	0	10	1	+9	8	1989 Copa Libertadores, Title Playoff				3–0	4–0	2–0
2	Unión Huaral	5	3	1	1	9	3	+6	7		1–1		1–0	5–0		
3	Alianza Atlético	5	1	3	1	5	5	0	5		0–0			1–1		2–1
4	Deportivo Junín	5	1	2	2	5	12	−7	4						2–1	
5	San Agustín	5	1	1	3	6	9	−3	3			0–1	2–2			3–0
6	Cienciano	5	1	1	3	5	10	−5	3			2–1		2–2		

Legend: Blue = home team win; Yellow = draw; Red = away team win.

==== Results ====
2 October 1988	San Agustín	3–0	Cienciano	Estadio Nacional, Lima
13:00	José Ziani 28'; José Antonio Conroy 35'; José Pajuelo 68'			Referee: Walter Barrios

2 October 1988	Unión Huaral	1–0	Alianza Atlético	Estadio Nacional, Lima
15:00	Fredy Berlanga 17' (o.g.)			Referee: Alberto Tejada

2 October 1988	Universitario	3–0	Deportivo Junín	Estadio Nacional, Lima
17:00	Juvenal Briceño 57'; Jesús Torrealva 65'; Oswaldo Araujo 73'			Attendance: 6,193

5 October 1988	Alianza Atlético	1–1	Deportivo Junín	Estadio Nacional, Lima
16:00	Guillermo Lavalle 90'		José Siguas 28'

5 October 1988	San Agustín	0–1	Unión Huaral	Estadio Nacional, Lima
18:00			Jorge Cordero 25'	Referee: José Ramírez

5 October 1988	Universitario	2–0	Cienciano	Estadio Nacional, Lima
20:00	José Del Solar 18'; José Carranza 49'			Attendance: 3,641; Referee: Sergio Leiblinger

9 October 1988	Alianza Atlético	2–1	Cienciano	Estadio Nacional, Lima
11:30	Guillermo Lavalle 50'; Jorge Castillo 62'		Percy Aguilar 38'

9 October 1988	Unión Huaral	5–0	Deportivo Junín	Estadio Nacional, Lima
13:30	Domingo Farfán 1'; Humberto Rey Muñoz 38'; Pedro Ruiz 40' (pen.); Jorge Cordero 42'; Ernesto Aguirre 83'			Referee: Sergio Leiblinger

9 October 1988	Universitario	4–0	San Agustín	Estadio Nacional, Lima
15:30	Javier Chirinos 39'; Juvenal Briceño 40'; Alfonso Yáñez 57'; Fidel Suárez 84'			Attendance: 4,954; Referee: Walter Barrios

12 October 1988	Deportivo Junín	2–1	San Agustín	Estadio Nacional, Lima
16:00	Israel Conde 2' (pen.); Antonio Peña 24'		Mario Avilés 5'	Referee: César Cachay

12 October 1988	Cienciano	2–1	Unión Huaral	Estadio Nacional, Lima
18:00	Alfonso Loayza 27'; Marco Echegaray 88'		Pedro Paredes 70'	Referee: Sergio Leiblinger

12 October 1988	Alianza Atlético	0–0	Universitario	Estadio Nacional, Lima
20:00				Attendance: 4,926; Referee: José Ramírez

16 October 1988	Cienciano	2–2	Deportivo Junín	Estadio Nacional, Lima
11:30	Juan Rivera 58'; César Adriazola 62'		Alfonso Loayza 3'; Antonio Peña 68'	Referee: Walter Barrios

16 October 1988	San Agustín	2–2	Alianza Atlético	Estadio Nacional, Lima
13:30	Juan Carlos Oblitas 74'; Mario Avilés 79'		Jorge Castillo 31'; José Zapata 76'	Referee: Sergio Leiblinger

16 October 1988	Unión Huaral	1–1	Universitario	Estadio Nacional, Lima
15:30	Jorge Cordero 90'		Jesús Torrealva 77'	Attendance: 15,430; Referee: César Pagano

== Torneo Descentralizado "B" ==
=== Zona Metropolitana ===
Pos	Team	Pld	W	D	L	GF	GA	GD	Pts	Qualification or relegation	ALI	GUA	JUV	CNI	AELU	INT
1	Alianza Lima	10	6	2	2	14	9	+5	14	Final group		1–1	0–1	3–2	2–0	1–0
2	Guardia Republicana (R)	10	5	4	1	10	5	+5	14	Relegation play-off	0–1		1–1	0–0	2–0	2–1
3	Juventud La Joya	10	1	7	2	12	13	−1	9		1–2	1–1		1–1	3–3	0–1
4	CNI	10	2	5	3	11	12	−1	9		2–2	0–1	1–1		1–1	1–2
5	AELU	10	2	4	4	12	15	−3	8		2–1	0–1	2–2	0–1		2–2
6	Internazionale (O)	10	2	2	6	8	13	−5	6	Relegation play-off	0–1	0–1	1–1	1–2	0–2	

Legend: Blue = home team win; Yellow = draw; Red = away team win.
(O) Play-off winners; (R) Relegated

==== Relegation play-off ====
* Internazionale, having finished last in the Zona Metropolitana of the Torneo Descentralizado B, had to play a relegation play-off against Guardia Republicana, who had finished last in the Zona Metropolitana of the Torneo Regional.

27 November 1988	Guardia Republicana	2–0	Internazionale	Estadio Nacional, Lima
14:00	Martín Matías 5' (pen.); Ayrton Loyola 76'			Referee: José Soto

4 December 1988	Internazionale	3–0	Guardia Republicana	Estadio Nacional, Lima
12:00	José Medina 32' 68'; Orlando Rosales 53'			Referee: César Cachay

7 December 1988	Guardia Republicana	1–1 (5–6 p)	Internazionale	Estadio Nacional, Lima
15:30	Oscar León 28'		José Medina 20' (pen.)
	Penalties
	Valdez (penalty scored); García (penalty scored); Matías (penalty missed); Portilla (penalty missed); Puente (penalty scored); Castillo (penalty scored); Martínez (penalty scored); Norberto García (penalty missed)		José Medina (penalty missed); Bolívar (penalty scored); Incháustegui (penalty scored); Torres (penalty missed); Rosales (penalty scored); Aliaga (penalty scored); Arguedas (penalty scored); Watson (penalty scored)

=== Zona Norte ===
Pos	Team	Pld	W	D	L	GF	GA	GD	Pts	Qualification or relegation	CAÑ	JUA	LIB	CAM	SET	HUN	GRA
1	Deportivo Cañaña	12	5	6	1	16	8	+8	16	Final group		1–0	1–1	1–2	1–0	3–0	1–1
2	Juan Aurich	12	4	6	2	9	7	+2	14		0–0		1–1	0–2	0–0	2–0	1–0
3	Libertad	12	2	9	1	10	7	+3	13		0–0	0–1		2–2	0–0	3–0	1–0
4	Carlos A. Mannucci	12	3	6	3	9	9	0	12		0–0	1–1	0–0		0–1	0–2	1–2
5	15 de Setiembre	12	1	9	2	8	9	−1	11		4–4	0–0	1–1	0–0		1–1	0–0
6	Hungaritos Agustinos (R)	12	3	3	6	9	15	−6	9	Relegation play-off	0–1	1–1	1–1	0–1	1–0		3–1
7	Atlético Grau (O)	12	2	5	5	7	13	−6	9	Relegation play-off	0–3	1–2	0–0	0–0	1–1	1–0	

Legend: Blue = home team win; Yellow = draw; Red = away team win.
(O) Play-off winners; (R) Relegated

==== Relegation play-off ====
* Atlético Grau, having finished last in the Zona Norte of the Torneo Descentralizado B, had to play a relegation play-off against Hungaritos Agustinos, who had finished last in the Zona Norte of the Torneo Regional.

18 December 1988	Atlético Grau	2–1	Hungaritos Agustinos	Estadio Miguel Grau, Piura
	Julio García 50'; Oscar Arana		Israel Rachummi 22'

Hungaritos Agustinos	–	Atlético Grau

Atlético Grau	–	Hungaritos Agustinos

=== Zona Centro ===
Pos	Team	Pld	W	D	L	GF	GA	GD	Pts	Qualification or relegation	AND	UMI	ADT	LEO	APM	PUC
1	Defensor ANDA	10	6	2	2	12	5	+7	14	Final group		—	—	—	1–0	—
2	Unión Minas	10	5	3	2	11	7	+4	13		2–0		1–0	1–1	4–1	W.O.
3	ADT	10	5	2	3	11	10	+1	12		1–1	0–0		1–0	2–1	W.O.
4	León de Huánuco	10	2	6	2	8	6	+2	10		0–1	0–0	4–1		2–2	1–0
5	Alipio Ponce	10	3	3	4	12	12	0	9		—	—	0–1	—		W.O.
6	Deportivo Pucallpa (R)	10	0	2	8	2	16	−14	2	Copa Perú	0–1	—	W.O.	—	—	

Legend: Blue = home team win; Yellow = draw; Red = away team win.
(R) Relegated

* Deportivo Pucallpa was relegated to the Copa Perú after accumulating three walkovers.

=== Zona Sur ===
Pos	Team	Pld	W	D	L	GF	GA	GD	Pts	Qualification or relegation	ALF	COR	ANM	TIN	HUR	DRJ
1	Alfonso Ugarte	10	5	3	2	15	5	+10	13	Final group		0–0	3–0	5–1	1–0	1–0
2	Coronel Bolognesi	10	4	4	2	13	5	+8	12		1–1		2–0	3–0	1–0	5–0
3	Alianza Naval (R)	10	5	2	3	7	9	−2	12	Relegation play-off	0–0	1–0		1–0	2–0	1–1
4	Deportivo Tintaya	10	4	1	5	10	17	−7	9		—	2–0	—		—	—
5	Atlético Huracán	10	3	1	6	10	11	−1	7		0–1	1–1	0–1	2–0		2–0
6	Diablos Rojos (O)	10	2	3	5	7	13	−6	7	Relegation play-off	1–0	0–0	—	3–3	2–0	

Source: Diario El Comercio 1988
Legend: Blue = home team win; Yellow = draw; Red = away team win.
(O) Play-off winners; (R) Relegated

==== Relegation play-off ====
* Diablos Rojos, having finished last in the Zona Sur of the Torneo Descentralizado B, had to play a relegation play-off against Alianza Naval, who had finished last in the Zona Sur of the Torneo Regional.

27 November 1988	Diablos Rojos	3–1	Alianza Naval	Estadio Guillermo Briceño Rosamedina, Juliaca

4 December 1988	Alianza Naval	1–0	Diablos Rojos	Estadio Municipal de Mollendo, Mollendo
	Calmet 73'			Attendance: 807

7 December 1988	Diablos Rojos	–	Alianza Naval	Estadio Jorge Basadre, Tacna
15:30

=== Final group ===
==== Standings ====
Pos	Team	Pld	W	D	L	GF	GA	GD	Pts	Qualification or relegation	ALI	CAÑ	ALF	AND
1	Alianza Lima	3	3	0	0	6	0	+6	6	Liguilla Final		2–0	2–0	2–0
2	Deportivo Cañaña	3	2	0	1	3	3	0	4				1–0	2–1
3	Alfonso Ugarte	3	1	0	2	1	3	−2	2					1–0
4	Defensor ANDA	3	0	0	3	1	5	−4	0					

Legend: Blue = home team win; Yellow = draw; Red = away team win.

==== Results ====
17 December 1988	Deportivo Cañaña	1–0	Alfonso Ugarte	Estadio Alejandro Villanueva, Lima
18:00	Néstor Fernández 5'

17 December 1988	Alianza Lima	2–0	Defensor ANDA	Estadio Alejandro Villanueva, Lima
20:00	Benjamín Rodríguez 70'; César Cueto 78' (pen.)			Attendance: 16,000; Referee: Walter Barrios

19 December 1988	Alfonso Ugarte	1–0	Defensor ANDA	Estadio Alejandro Villanueva, Lima
15:30	Manuel Reinoso 39'

19 December 1988	Alianza Lima	2–0	Deportivo Cañaña	Estadio Alejandro Villanueva, Lima
17:30	Juan Illescas 37' (pen.); Antonio Alguedas 75'			Attendance: 14,701; Referee: José Ramírez

21 December 1988	Deportivo Cañaña	2–1	Defensor ANDA	Estadio Alejandro Villanueva, Lima
16:00

21 December 1988	Alianza Lima	2–0	Alfonso Ugarte	Estadio Alejandro Villanueva, Lima
18:00	César Cueto 64'; Benjamín Rodríguez 72'			Attendance: 14,607; Referee: Sergio Leiblinger

== Torneo Descentralizado "A" ==
=== Standings ===
Pos	Team	Pld	W	D	L	GF	GA	GD	Pts	Qualification or relegation
1	Sporting Cristal	22	11	6	5	28	15	+13	28	Liguilla Final, Bonus +2
2	Alianza Atlético	22	12	3	7	29	23	+6	27	Liguilla Final, Bonus +1
3	Universitario	22	10	6	6	42	20	+22	26	Liguilla Final
4	Unión Huaral	22	11	4	7	34	27	+7	26	Liguilla Final
5	Octavio Espinosa	22	10	4	8	32	29	+3	24	Liguilla Final
6	UTC	22	9	6	7	28	25	+3	24	
7	Deportivo Junín	22	9	4	9	29	23	+6	22	
8	Cienciano	22	7	6	9	27	35	−8	20	
9	Melgar	22	7	5	10	33	39	−6	19	
10	San Agustín	22	5	8	9	19	33	−14	18	
11	Deportivo Municipal	22	5	7	10	25	33	−8	17	
12	Mina San Vicente	22	3	7	12	13	37	−24	13	

==== Results ====
Home \ Away	AAS	CIE	JUN	MUN	MEL	MSV	OCT	AGU	CRI	HUA	UNI	UTC
Alianza Atlético		3–1	2–0	2–1	4–0	1–0	2–1	3–0	1–0	2–1	2–1	1–0
Cienciano	3–0		0–0	1–1	3–1	0–0	2–0	2–2	1–0	5–2	2–1	2–1
Deportivo Junín	3–0	2–1		0–0	3–0	1–0	4–2	1–1	5–1	1–0	2–3	2–0
Deportivo Municipal	0–1	2–1	1–1		3–2	3–1	4–0	0–1	1–1	0–1	0–0	1–1
Melgar	1–0	1–0	2–1	6–1		5–0	1–3	1–1	0–1	4–2	2–1	2–2
Mina San Vicente	1–1	0–0	1–0	4–1	1–1		1–2	0–0	0–0	1–1	1–3	2–1
Octavio Espinosa	3–1	3–0	2–1	1–0	4–1	1–0		1–1	1–1	0–1	0–0	1–1
San Agustín	1–0	3–0	0–2	4–2	2–2	1–0	0–1		0–1	0–2	0–5	1–2
Sporting Cristal	1–1	2–0	1–0	1–0	4–0	3–0	3–1	0–0		1–0	4–0	1–1
Unión Huaral	4–2	3–1	2–0	2–1	2–1	3–0	1–4	1–1	1–2		1–0	3–0
Universitario	0–0	6–0	1–0	1–1	0–0	7–0	3–1	4–0	1–0	1–1		4–1
UTC	1–0	2–2	3–0	1–3	1–0	2–0	1–0	4–0	1–0	0–0	2–0	

Updated to match(es) played on 1988. Source:
Legend: Blue = home team win; Yellow = draw; Red = away team win.

=== Liguilla Final ===
==== Standings ====
Pos	Team	Pld	W	D	L	GF	GA	GD	Pts	Qualification or relegation	CRI	UNI	AAS	OCT	HUA	ALI
1	Sporting Cristal	5	2	2	1	3	2	+1	8	1989 Copa Libertadores, Title Playoff		0–0	0–1	1–0	1–0	
2	Universitario	5	2	3	0	6	3	+3	7				2–1	0–0	2–0	2–2
3	Alianza Atlético	5	2	1	2	4	4	0	6					0–0		
4	Octavio Espinosa	5	1	3	1	5	4	+1	5							4–2
5	Unión Huaral	5	1	2	2	4	6	−2	4				1–0	1–1		
6	Alianza Lima	5	0	3	2	8	11	−3	3		1–1		1–2		2–2	

Source: Diario El Comercio 1988
Legend: Blue = home team win; Yellow = draw; Red = away team win.

==== Results ====
8 January 1989	Sporting Cristal	0–1	Alianza Atlético	Estadio Nacional, Lima
14:00			José Zapata 89' (pen.)	Referee: Ricardo Allemant

8 January 1989	Universitario	0–0	Octavio Espinosa	Estadio Nacional, Lima
16:00				Referee: César Cachay

8 January 1989	Alianza Lima	2–2	Unión Huaral	Estadio Nacional, Lima
18:00	César Cueto 39' (pen.); Manuel Earl 61'		Domingo Farfán 45' 82'	Attendance: 43,127; Referee: Sergio Leiblinger

11 January 1989	Sporting Cristal	1–0	Octavio Espinosa	Estadio Nacional, Lima
16:00	Julio César Uribe 5'			Referee: Fernando Chappell

11 January 1989	Unión Huaral	1–0	Alianza Atlético	Estadio Nacional, Lima
18:00	Ernesto Aguirre 44'			Referee: Julio Alcántara

11 January 1989	Universitario	2–2	Alianza Lima	Estadio Nacional, Lima
20:00	Andrés Gonzáles 72'; Fidel Suárez 82'		Manuel Earl 34'; César Cueto 89'	Attendance: 45,104; Referee: Carlos Montalván

15 January 1989	Alianza Atlético	0–0	Octavio Espinosa	Estadio Nacional, Lima
14:00				Referee: Fernando Ibáñez

15 January 1989	Universitario	2–0	Unión Huaral	Estadio Nacional, Lima
16:00	Andrés Gonzáles 54'; Fidel Suárez 70'			Referee: Juan Miranda

15 January 1989	Alianza Lima	1–1	Sporting Cristal	Estadio Nacional, Lima
18:00	César Cueto 65'		Francesco Manassero 61'	Attendance: 34,361; Referee: Walter Barrios

18 January 1989	Unión Huaral	1–1	Octavio Espinosa	Estadio Nacional, Lima
16:00	Domingo Farfán 72'		Walter Pereyra 82'

18 January 1989	Alianza Lima	1–2	Alianza Atlético	Estadio Nacional, Lima
18:00	Antonio Alguedas 80'		José Zapata 1'; Ramón Anchissi 71'	Referee: Sergio Leiblinger

18 January 1989	Sporting Cristal	0–0	Universitario	Estadio Nacional, Lima
20:00				Attendance: 43,104; Referee: Carlos Rivero Jr.

22 January 1989	Octavio Espinosa	4–2	Alianza Lima	Estadio Nacional, Lima
14:00	Enrique Goyzueta 23'; Rolando Aseretto 28'; Freddy Torrealva 31'; Julio Falconí 68'		Francisco Huerta 13'; Anselmo Soto 90'	Referee: Juan Carlos Espino

22 January 1989	Sporting Cristal	1–0	Unión Huaral	Estadio Nacional, Lima
16:00	Julio César Uribe 13' (pen.)			Referee: Jaime Rodríguez

22 January 1989	Universitario	2–1	Alianza Atlético	Estadio Nacional, Lima
18:00	Eduardo Rey Muñoz 14'; Jesús Torrealva 54'		Pedro Sanjinez 35'	Referee: Alfonso Postigo

== Title Playoff ==
26 January 1989
19:30

Sporting Cristal	2–1	Universitario
Óscar Calvo 60'; Luis Redher 90+2'		Fidel Suárez 88'

Estadio Nacional, Lima
Attendance: 28,200
Referee: Juan Carlos Miranda

== See also ==
- 1988 Peruvian Segunda División
