= 1985 Peruvian División Intermedia =

División Intermedia
- Season: 1985

The División Intermedia, the second division of Peruvian football (soccer) in 1984 until 1987. The tournament was played on a home-and-away round-robin basis.

== Metropolitan Region ==
=== Intermedia A ===
| Pos | Team | Pld | W | D | L | GF | GA | GD | Pts | Qualification or relegation |
|---|---|---|---|---|---|---|---|---|---|---|
| 1 | San Agustín | 0 | 0 | 0 | 0 | 0 | 0 | 0 | 0 | 1986 Torneo Descentralizado |
| 2 | Juventud La Palma | 0 | 0 | 0 | 0 | 0 | 0 | 0 | 0 | 1986 Torneo Descentralizado |
| 3 | Unión Huaral | 0 | 0 | 0 | 0 | 0 | 0 | 0 | 0 | Liguilla de Promoción |
| 4 | Atlético Chalaco | 0 | 0 | 0 | 0 | 0 | 0 | 0 | 0 | Liguilla de Promoción |
| 5 | Centro Iqueño | 0 | 0 | 0 | 0 | 0 | 0 | 0 | 0 | Liguilla de Promoción |
| 6 | Alcides Vigo | 0 | 0 | 0 | 0 | 0 | 0 | 0 | 0 | Liguilla de Promoción |

=== Intermedia B ===
==== North ====
| Pos | Team | Pld | W | D | L | GF | GA | GD | Pts | Qualification or relegation |
|---|---|---|---|---|---|---|---|---|---|---|
| 1 | Cantolao | 0 | 0 | 0 | 0 | 0 | 0 | 0 | 0 | Pre-Liguilla |
| 2 | Juventud Progreso | 0 | 0 | 0 | 0 | 0 | 0 | 0 | 0 | Pre-Liguilla |
| 3 | ETE | 0 | 0 | 0 | 0 | 0 | 0 | 0 | 0 | Pre-Liguilla |
| 4 | Defensor Lima | 0 | 0 | 0 | 0 | 0 | 0 | 0 | 0 | 1986 Segunda División |
| 5 | Círcolo Sportivo Paramonga | 0 | 0 | 0 | 0 | 0 | 0 | 0 | 0 | 1986 Segunda División |
| 6 | Aurora Miraflores | 0 | 0 | 0 | 0 | 0 | 0 | 0 | 0 | 1986 Segunda División |
| 7 | Grumete Medina | 0 | 0 | 0 | 0 | 0 | 0 | 0 | 0 | 1986 Segunda División |
| 8 | Juventud Apurímac | 0 | 0 | 0 | 0 | 0 | 0 | 0 | 0 | 1986 Copa Perú |

==== South ====
| Pos | Team | Pld | W | D | L | GF | GA | GD | Pts | Qualification or relegation |
|---|---|---|---|---|---|---|---|---|---|---|
| 1 | Guardia Republicana | 0 | 0 | 0 | 0 | 0 | 0 | 0 | 0 | Pre-Liguilla |
| 2 | Lawn Tennis | 0 | 0 | 0 | 0 | 0 | 0 | 0 | 0 | Pre-Liguilla |
| 3 | Deportivo Aviación | 0 | 0 | 0 | 0 | 0 | 0 | 0 | 0 | Pre-Liguilla |
| 4 | Walter Ormeño | 0 | 0 | 0 | 0 | 0 | 0 | 0 | 0 | 1986 Segunda División |
| 5 | Atlético Peruano | 0 | 0 | 0 | 0 | 0 | 0 | 0 | 0 | 1986 Segunda División |
| 6 | ENAPU | 0 | 0 | 0 | 0 | 0 | 0 | 0 | 0 | 1986 Segunda División |
| 7 | Santos | 0 | 0 | 0 | 0 | 0 | 0 | 0 | 0 | 1986 Segunda División |
| 8 | Independiente | 0 | 0 | 0 | 0 | 0 | 0 | 0 | 0 | 1986 Segunda División |

=== Pre-Liguilla ===
| Pos | Team | Pld | W | D | L | GF | GA | GD | Pts | Qualification or relegation |
|---|---|---|---|---|---|---|---|---|---|---|
| 1 | Cantolao | 0 | 0 | 0 | 0 | 0 | 0 | 0 | 0 | Liguilla de Promoción |
| 2 | Guardia Republicana | 0 | 0 | 0 | 0 | 0 | 0 | 0 | 0 | Liguilla de Promoción |
| 3 | Juventud Progreso | 0 | 0 | 0 | 0 | 0 | 0 | 0 | 0 | 1986 Segunda División |
| 4 | ETE | 0 | 0 | 0 | 0 | 0 | 0 | 0 | 0 | 1986 Segunda División |
| 5 | Lawn Tennis | 0 | 0 | 0 | 0 | 0 | 0 | 0 | 0 | 1986 Segunda División |
| 6 | Deportivo Aviación | 0 | 0 | 0 | 0 | 0 | 0 | 0 | 0 | 1986 Segunda División |

=== Liguilla de Promoción ===
| Pos | Team | Pld | W | D | L | GF | GA | GD | Pts | Qualification or relegation |
|---|---|---|---|---|---|---|---|---|---|---|
| 1 | Guardia Republicana | 0 | 0 | 0 | 0 | 0 | 0 | 0 | 0 | 1986 Torneo Descentralizado |
| 2 | Unión Huaral | 0 | 0 | 0 | 0 | 0 | 0 | 0 | 0 | 1986 Torneo Descentralizado |
| 3 | Centro Iqueño | 0 | 0 | 0 | 0 | 0 | 0 | 0 | 0 | 1986 Segunda División |
| 4 | Atlético Chalaco | 0 | 0 | 0 | 0 | 0 | 0 | 0 | 0 | 1986 Segunda División |
| 5 | Alcides Vigo | 0 | 0 | 0 | 0 | 0 | 0 | 0 | 0 | 1986 Segunda División |
| 6 | Cantolao | 0 | 0 | 0 | 0 | 0 | 0 | 0 | 0 | 1986 Segunda División |

== North Region ==
| Pos | Team | Pld | W | D | L | GF | GA | GD | Pts | Qualification or relegation |
|---|---|---|---|---|---|---|---|---|---|---|
| 1 | Atlético Grau | 0 | 0 | 0 | 0 | 0 | 0 | 0 | 0 | 1986 Torneo Descentralizado |
| 2 | Atlético Torino | 0 | 0 | 0 | 0 | 0 | 0 | 0 | 0 | 1986 Torneo Descentralizado |
| 3 | José Gálvez | 0 | 0 | 0 | 0 | 0 | 0 | 0 | 0 | 1986 Copa Perú |
| 4 | Sport Pilsen | 0 | 0 | 0 | 0 | 0 | 0 | 0 | 0 | 1986 Copa Perú |
| 5 | Cultural Casma | 0 | 0 | 0 | 0 | 0 | 0 | 0 | 0 | 1986 Copa Perú |

== Center Region ==
| Pos | Team | Pld | W | D | L | GF | GA | GD | Pts | Qualification or relegation |
|---|---|---|---|---|---|---|---|---|---|---|
| 1 | León de Huánuco | 0 | 0 | 0 | 0 | 0 | 0 | 0 | 0 | 1986 Torneo Descentralizado |
| 2 | Unión Minas | 0 | 0 | 0 | 0 | 0 | 0 | 0 | 0 | 1986 Torneo Descentralizado |
| 3 | Defensor ANDA | 0 | 0 | 0 | 0 | 0 | 0 | 0 | 0 | 1986 Torneo Descentralizado |
| 4 | Deportivo Pucallpa | 0 | 0 | 0 | 0 | 0 | 0 | 0 | 0 | 1986 Torneo Descentralizado |
| 5 | Chanchamayo | 0 | 0 | 0 | 0 | 0 | 0 | 0 | 0 | 1986 Copa Perú |

== South Region ==
| Pos | Team | Pld | W | D | L | GF | GA | GD | Pts | Qualification or relegation |
|---|---|---|---|---|---|---|---|---|---|---|
| 1 | Atlético Huracán | 0 | 0 | 0 | 0 | 0 | 0 | 0 | 0 | 1986 Torneo Descentralizado |
| 2 | Mariscal Nieto | 0 | 0 | 0 | 0 | 0 | 0 | 0 | 0 | 1986 Torneo Descentralizado |
| 3 | Cienciano | 0 | 0 | 0 | 0 | 0 | 0 | 0 | 0 | 1986 Torneo Descentralizado |
| 4 | Diablos Rojos | 0 | 0 | 0 | 0 | 0 | 0 | 0 | 0 | 1986 Copa Perú |
| 5 | Bancos Unidos | 0 | 0 | 0 | 0 | 0 | 0 | 0 | 0 | 1986 Copa Perú |
