= 1984 Torneo Descentralizado =

Torneo Descentralizado
- Season: 1984
- Dates: 4 March 1984 – 9 January 1985
- Champions: Sport Boys (6th title)
- Runner up: Universitario
- Relegated: Deportivo Hospital
- Copa Libertadores: Sport Boys; Universitario
- Top goalscorer: Jaime Drago; Francisco Montero (13 goals each)

The 1984 Torneo Descentralizado is the top category of Peruvian football (soccer), was played by 25 teams. The national champion was Sport Boys.

== Format ==
The national championship was divided into two tournaments, the Regional Tournament and the Descentralized Tournament. The winners of each tournament faced off in the final and received the berths for the Copa Libertadores 1985. The Regional Tournament divided the teams into four groups; Metropolitan, North, Central, and South. Teams that not qualified for Descentralised Tournament played on the Intermediary Division against teams from Second Division to gain promotion for next year. Regional Tournament grew to 30 teams for 1985. If any of the Regional Groups winners finished on the top 6 of Descentralised Tournament, that team earned the right to playoff in the Liguilla against Descentralised runner-up for a Copa Libertadores place.

== Teams ==
=== Team changes ===
Promoted from 1983 Copa Perú	Invited from 1983 Segunda División	Invited from Ligas Departamentales	Relegated from 1983 Primera División
▲ Sport Pilsen (1st) ▲ Cienciano (Invited)	▲ José Gálvez (4th) ▲ Carlos A. Mannucci (5th) ▲ Juventud La Palma (6th) ▲ Octavio Espinosa (7th)	▲ Deportivo Hospital (Invited) ▲ Hostal Rey (Invited) ▲ Defensor ANDA (Invited) ▲ Diablos Rojos (Invited)	▼ Juan Aurich (16th) ▼ León de Huánuco (17th)

=== Stadia locations ===
Locations of the 1984 Primera División teams

Team	City	Stadium	Capacity	Field
Alfonso Ugarte	Puno	Enrique Torres Belón	20,000	Grass
Alianza Lima	La Victoria, Lima	Alejandro Villanueva	35,000	Grass
ADT	Tarma	Unión Tarma	9,000	Grass
Atlético Chalaco	Callao	Miguel Grau	15,000	Grass
Atlético Torino	Talara	Campeonísimo	8,000	Grass
Carlos A. Mannucci	Trujillo	Mansiche	24,000	Grass
Cienciano	Cusco	Garcilaso	42,056	Grass
CNI	Iquitos	Max Augustín	24,000	Grass
Coronel Bolognesi	Tacna	Jorge Basadre	19,850	Grass
Defensor ANDA	Aucayacu	Municipal de Aucayacu	5,000	Grass
Diablos Rojos	Juliaca	Enrique Torres Belón	20,000	Grass
Deportivo Hospital	Pucallpa	Aliardo Soria Pérez	15,000	Grass
Deportivo Municipal	Cercado de Lima	Nacional	45,750	Grass
Hostal Rey	Chanchamayo	Municipal de Chanchamayo	5,000	Grass
Huancayo	Huancayo	Huancayo	20,000	Grass
José Gálvez	Chimbote	Manuel Rivera Sanchez	25,000	Grass
Juventud La Palma	Huacho	Segundo Aranda Torres	12,000	Grass
Melgar	Arequipa	Mariano Melgar	20,000	Grass
Octavio Espinosa	Ica	José Picasso Peratta	8,000	Grass
Sport Boys	Callao	Miguel Grau	15,000	Grass
Sport Pilsen	Guadalupe	Guadalupe	5,000	Grass
Sporting Cristal	Rímac, Lima	Nacional	45,750	Grass
Unión Huaral	Huaral	Julio Lores Colan	10,000	Grass
UTC	Cajamarca	Héroes de San Ramón	18,000	Grass
Universitario	Breña, Lima	Nacional	45,750	Grass

== Torneo Regional ==
=== Zona Metropolitana ===
Pos	Team	Pld	W	D	L	GF	GA	GD	Pts	Qualification or relegation	UNI	ALI	CRI	SBA	HUA	CNI	MUN	CHA	JLP	OCT
1	Universitario	18	10	6	2	28	14	+14	26	Torneo Descentralizado		1–1	2–1	1–2	3–2	1–0	1–1	1–0	2–2	3–0
2	Alianza Lima	18	8	8	2	28	16	+12	24	Torneo Descentralizado	0–1		1–1	4–1	0–0	3–2	1–0	3–1	1–1	1–1
3	Sporting Cristal	18	9	4	5	37	26	+11	22	Torneo Descentralizado	0–1	2–2		1–4	2–1	1–0	4–1	5–1	4–3	0–0
4	Sport Boys	18	8	5	5	31	22	+9	21	Torneo Descentralizado	1–1	2–2	1–3		0–1	3–1	2–2	0–1	6–0	1–0
5	Unión Huaral	18	6	4	8	17	22	−5	16	Torneo Descentralizado	1–2	1–1	1–0	1–3		1–0	1–4	1–2	1–0	2–1
6	CNI	18	6	4	8	15	21	−6	16	Torneo Descentralizado	0–3	1–0	4–3	0–0	0–0		1–0	0–0	2–0	2–1
7	Deportivo Municipal	18	4	7	7	23	26	−3	15	Qualification play-offs	0–3	1–2	2–2	2–3	0–1	3–0		0–0	2–2	1–0
8	Atlético Chalaco	18	3	9	6	21	28	−7	15	Qualification play-offs	2–2	0–3	1–2	1–2	2–2	1–1	2–2		5–2	2–2
9	Juventud La Palma	18	3	7	8	17	34	−17	13	1984 División Intermedia	1–0	0–2	1–5	0–0	1–0	1–0	1–1	0–0		2–2
10	Octavio Espinosa	18	3	6	9	10	18	−8	12	1984 División Intermedia	0–0	0–1	0–1	1–0	1–0	0–1	0–1	0–0	1–0	

Legend: Blue = home team win; Yellow = draw; Red = away team win.

=== Zona Norte ===
Pos	Team	Pld	W	D	L	GF	GA	GD	Pts	Qualification or relegation
1	Atlético Torino	16	8	4	4	29	21	+8	20	Torneo Descentralizado
2	Sport Pilsen	16	7	5	4	28	26	+2	19	Torneo Descentralizado
3	UTC	16	7	4	5	30	20	+10	18	Qualification play-offs
4	Carlos A. Mannucci	16	4	4	8	19	28	−9	12	1984 División Intermedia
5	José Gálvez	16	3	5	8	24	35	−11	11	1984 División Intermedia

==== Results ====
===== Matches 1–8 =====
Home \ Away	TOR	CAM	JGÁ	SPC	UTC
Atlético Torino		4–2	5–1	0–1	2–1
Carlos A. Mannucci	1–0		1–1	2–1	2–1
José Gálvez	1–2	1–1		3–4	3–1
Sport Pilsen	1–1	1–1	2–5		1–1
UTC	2–2	6–0	2–1	0–3	

Updated to match(es) played on unknown. Source:
Legend: Blue = home team win; Yellow = draw; Red = away team win.

===== Matches 9–16 =====
Home \ Away	TOR	CAM	JGÁ	SPC	UTC
Atlético Torino		2–1	2–2	4–1	1–1
Carlos A. Mannucci	1–2		3–0	1–1	1–2
José Gálvez	0–1	2–1		2–2	1–1
Sport Pilsen	3–1	2–1	2–1		2–1
UTC	2–0	2–0	5–0	2–1	

Updated to match(es) played on unknown. Source:
Legend: Blue = home team win; Yellow = draw; Red = away team win.

=== Zona Centro ===
Pos	Team	Pld	W	D	L	GF	GA	GD	Pts	Qualification or relegation
1	ADT	16	9	4	3	26	12	+14	22	Torneo Descentralizado
2	Huancayo	16	6	5	5	18	15	+3	17	Torneo Descentralizado
3	Defensor ANDA	16	7	3	6	14	15	−1	17	1984 División Intermedia
4	Deportivo Hospital	16	7	1	8	17	20	−3	15	1984 División Intermedia
5	Hostal Rey	16	2	5	9	15	28	−13	9	1984 División Intermedia

==== Results ====
===== Matches 1–8 =====
Home \ Away	ADT	AND	HOS	HUA	HRE
ADT		2–0	3–1	1–1	3–1
Defensor ANDA	0–1		1–0	1–0	1–2
Deportivo Hospital	2–1	1–0		3–1	2–1
Huancayo	0–1	1–1	1–0		2–1
Hostal Rey	0–1	0–0	1–2	2–1	

Updated to match(es) played on unknown. Source:
Legend: Blue = home team win; Yellow = draw; Red = away team win.

===== Matches 9–16 =====
Home \ Away	ADT	AND	HOS	HUA	HRE
ADT		3–0	1–0	0–0	5–0
Defensor ANDA	3–2		1–0	2–1	1–0
Deportivo Hospital	2–0	0–2		0–1	2–2
Huancayo	0–0	2–1	3–0		4–2
Hostal Rey	2–2	0–0	1–2	0–0	

Updated to match(es) played on unknown. Source:
Legend: Blue = home team win; Yellow = draw; Red = away team win.

=== Zona Sur ===
Pos	Team	Pld	W	D	L	GF	GA	GD	Pts	Qualification or relegation
1	Melgar	16	9	3	4	21	14	+7	21	Torneo Descentralizado
2	Diablos Rojos	16	9	2	5	22	12	+10	20	Torneo Descentralizado
3	Coronel Bolognesi	16	6	4	6	16	15	+1	16	Qualification play-offs
4	Cienciano	16	4	4	8	9	20	−11	12	1984 División Intermedia
5	Alfonso Ugarte	16	5	1	10	24	30	−6	11	1984 División Intermedia

==== Results ====
===== Matches 1–8 =====
Home \ Away	ALF	BOL	CIE	DRJ	MEL
Alfonso Ugarte		2–1	0–0	4–2	3–1
Coronel Bolognesi	2–1		3–1	1–0	1–2
Cienciano	3–1	0–1		0–0	0–2
Diablos Rojos	3–2	2–1	1–0		1–0
Melgar	3–2	1–0	0–0	1–0	

Updated to match(es) played on unknown. Source:
Legend: Blue = home team win; Yellow = draw; Red = away team win.

===== Matches 9–16 =====
Home \ Away	ALF	BOL	CIE	DRJ	MEL
Alfonso Ugarte		0–2	3–1	1–4	2–3
Coronel Bolognesi	2–1		1–1	0–0	1–1
Cienciano	0–1	1–0		1–0	1–0
Diablos Rojos	1–0	3–0	3–0		2–0
Melgar	2–1	0–0	4–0	1–0	

Updated to match(es) played on unknown. Source:
Legend: Blue = home team win; Yellow = draw; Red = away team win.

=== Qualification play-offs ===
==== First leg ====
29 June 1984	UTC	1–1	Deportivo Municipal	Estadio Héroes de San Ramón, Cajamarca
11:30	Leo Saavedra 42'		Alberto Castillo 84' (pen.)	Referee: César Cachay

29 June 1984	Coronel Bolognesi	2–1	Atlético Chalaco	Estadio Jorge Basadre, Tacna
15:30	Víctor Barzola 63'; Juan José Ore 80' (pen.)		Dimas Cuevas 28'	Referee: José Ramírez

==== Second leg ====
1 July 1984	Atlético Chalaco	1–1	Coronel Bolognesi	Estadio Alejandro Villanueva, Lima
14:00	Adhemir Arroé 73' (pen.)		Juan José Oré 80'	Referee: Enrique Labó

1 July 1984	Deportivo Municipal	2–2 (3–5 p)	UTC	Estadio Alejandro Villanueva, Lima
16:00	Enrique Shioda; Eduardo Saavedra		Juan Sánchez; David Delgado	Referee: Carlos Montalván
	Penalties
	Freddy Maldonado (penalty scored); Eduardo Saavedra (penalty scored); Richard Garrido (penalty scored); Aldo Dueñas (penalty missed)		Manuel Herrera (penalty scored); Jesús Purizaga (penalty scored); Leo Saavedra (penalty scored); Armando Portilla (penalty scored); Juan Sánchez (penalty scored)

* Coronel Bolognesi and UTC qualified for the Torneo Descentralizado.

== Torneo Descentralizado ==
=== Standings ===
Pos	Team	Pld	W	D	L	GF	GA	GD	Pts	Qualification
1	Sport Boys (C)	26	13	9	4	34	15	+19	35	1985 Copa Libertadores
2	CNI	26	13	8	5	42	22	+20	34	Liguilla Pre-Libertadores
3	Alianza Lima	26	10	9	7	34	17	+17	29	
4	Sporting Cristal	26	8	12	6	35	24	+11	28	
5	Melgar	26	9	10	7	25	22	+3	28	Liguilla Pre-Libertadores
6	Universitario	26	11	5	10	41	32	+9	27	Liguilla Pre-Libertadores
7	Atlético Torino	26	11	5	10	44	40	+4	27	
8	Coronel Bolognesi	26	9	8	9	26	28	−2	26	
9	Huancayo	26	9	8	9	21	34	−13	26	
10	ADT	26	6	11	9	15	28	−13	23	
11	Unión Huaral	26	9	4	13	24	37	−13	22	
12	UTC	25	8	5	12	24	27	−3	21	
13	Sport Pilsen	26	6	7	13	27	47	−20	19	
14	Diablos Rojos	25	4	9	12	13	32	−19	17	

(C) Champions

=== Results ===
Home \ Away	ADT	ALI	TOR	CNI	BOL	DIA	HYO	MEL	SBA	PIL	CRI	HUA	UTC	UNI
ADT		0–0	0–0	0–0	1–0	0–0	2–1	0–0	0–0	1–0	1–0	2–1	2–0	0–1
Alianza Lima	2–0		3–0	1–0	4–1	2–0	1–0	1–2	1–1	11–0	0–0	2–1	0–0	1–1
Atlético Torino	3–0	3–2		2–0	1–2	7–2	4–1	4–2	1–2	0–1	3–2	1–0	2–0	3–1
CNI	2–0	1–0	3–2		3–2	1–0	7–0	0–0	1–0	3–0	1–1	6–1	3–1	1–0
Coronel Bolognesi	3–0	0–1	2–2	1–1		2–0	0–0	1–0	0–0	2–1	1–2	1–0	1–0	1–2
Diablos Rojos	0–0	0–0	0–2	0–0	2–0		1–0	0–0	0–1	1–1	1–1	3–0	W.O.	3–0
Huancayo	1–1	1–0	3–1	0–1	3–0	0–0		1–0	1–0	1–0	0–0	2–0	1–0	1–0
Melgar	1–1	0–0	0–0	1–1	1–1	3–0	0–0		1–0	2–0	2–1	3–0	1–0	2–0
Sport Boys	4–0	0–0	3–0	2–1	0–1	2–0	1–1	1–0		2–1	1–1	3–0	1–0	1–1
Sport Pilsen	2–2	0–0	2–2	1–2	2–3	1–0	1–1	1–1	1–2		1–0	3–0	1–0	2–1
Sporting Cristal	1–1	1–2	1–0	1–1	1–0	4–0	1–0	4–0	0–0	3–3		1–1	4–1	4–1
Unión Huaral	2–0	1–0	0–0	3–1	0–0	2–0	5–0	1–0	1–4	1–0	0–0		2–1	0–2
UTC	2–0	2–0	5–0	2–1	0–0	0–0	1–1	0–2	1–1	2–0	2–0	1–0		2–1
Universitario	2–1	2–0	3–1	1–1	1–1	3–0	7–1	4–1	1–2	3–0	1–1	1–2	1–0	

Updated to match(es) played on 1984. Source: RSSSF Peru 1984
Legend: Blue = home team win; Yellow = draw; Red = away team win.

== Liguilla Pre-Libertadores ==
=== Standings ===
Pos	Team	Pld	W	D	L	GF	GA	GD	Pts	Qualification	UNI	MEL	CNI
1	Universitario	2	0	2	0	1	1	0	2	1985 Copa Libertadores		1–1	
2	Melgar	2	0	2	0	1	1	0	2				0–0
3	CNI	2	0	2	0	0	0	0	2		0–0		

Legend: Blue = home team win; Yellow = draw; Red = away team win.

=== Results ===
30 December 1984	Universitario	1–1	Melgar	Estadio Nacional, Lima
17:00	Javier Chirinos 28'		Víctor Gutiérrez 15'	Attendance: 15,160; Referee: Carlos Montalván

3 January 1985	Melgar	0–0	CNI	Estadio Nacional, Lima
20:00				Attendance: 5,796; Referee: Edison Pérez

6 January 1985	CNI	0–0	Universitario	Estadio Nacional, Lima
19:00				Attendance: 33,578; Referee: Alfonso Postigo

==== Tiebreaker ====
9 January 1985	Universitario	2–1	Melgar	Estadio Nacional, Lima
20:00	Percy Rojas 52'; Claudio Pedraglio 71'		Víctor Gutiérrez 26'	Attendance: 37,687; Referee: José Ramírez

== See also ==
- 1984 Copa Perú
