= Peruvian División Intermedia (1984–1987) =

División Intermedia
- Founded: 1984
- Folded: 1987
- Country: Peru
- Confederation: CONMEBOL
- Level on pyramid: 2
- Promotion to: Primera División
- Relegation to: Segunda División; Copa Perú

The División Intermedia, the second division of Peruvian football (soccer) in 1984 until 1987. The tournament was played on a home-and-away round-robin basis.

== History ==
The Intermedia was a promotion championship in Peru that operated between the Peruvian Primera División (top tier) and the Peruvian Segunda División and Copa Perú (lower tiers). It was held during the Regional Championships era between 1984 and 1987.

As the Peruvian Primera División was divided into four zones—North, Center, South, and Metropolitan—the competition format varied by region. In the North, Center, and South zones, the lowest-ranked teams from each First Division zone competed against clubs from the Copa Perú. The winners of each zone earned promotion (or retained their place) in the First Division for the following season, while the remaining teams returned to the Copa Perú.

In the Metropolitan area, the system was more complex and was split into Intermedia A and Intermedia B. Intermedia A featured the lowest-ranked teams from the Metropolitan Zone of the First Division alongside the top teams from the Second Division, with the winners securing places in the First Division.

Meanwhile, the remaining Second Division teams competed in Intermedia B against the champions of Regions IV and IX of the Copa Perú. The top teams from Intermedia B advanced to face those Intermedia A teams that had failed to secure promotion, with the final First Division spots at stake. Intermedia B also determined the team relegated to the Copa Perú, in addition to those relegated from the Second Division.

Once both Intermedia tournaments concluded, the teams that neither achieved promotion to the First Division nor were relegated to the Copa Perú competed in the Second Division the following season.

== Promotions ==
Ed.	Season	Metropolitan Zone	North Zone	Center Zone	South Zone
1	1984	Deportivo Municipal; Atlético Chalaco; Octavio Espinosa; Juventud La Joya; San Agustín; Juventud La Palma	Carlos A. Mannucci; José Gálvez	León de Huánuco; Defensor ANDA; Hostal Rey; Deportivo Cooptrip	Alfonso Ugarte; Cienciano; Atlético Huracán
2	1985	San Agustín; Juventud La Palma; Guardia Republicana; Unión Huaral	Atlético Grau; Atlético Torino	León de Huánuco; Unión Minas; Defensor ANDA; Deportivo Cooptrip	Atlético Huracán; Mariscal Nieto; Cienciano
3	1986	Internazionale; CNI; Unión Huaral; Juventud La Joya	Atlético Torino; Carlos A. Mannucci	Mina San Vicente; Deportivo Junín	Alfonso Ugarte; Atlético Huracán; Juvenil Los Ángeles
4	1987	AELU; Internazionale; Octavio Espinosa; Juventud La Joya; Guardia Republicana	Alianza Atlético; Atlético Grau; 15 de Septiembre; Juan Aurich; Deportivo Cañaña	ADT; León de Huánuco; Alipio Ponce; Mina San Vicente; Defensor ANDA	Melgar; Alianza Naval; Atlético Huracán; Diablos Rojos; Deportivo Tintaya
Defunct Tournament
