= Juvenal Briceño =

Peruvian footballer and manager (born 1970)

Personal information
- Full name: Juvenal Briceño Ramos
- Date of birth: 11 December 1965 (age 60)
- Place of birth: Arequipa, Peru
- Position: Forward

Senior career*
Years	Team	Apps	(Gls)
1984–1986	FBC Melgar		
1987–1989	Universitario		
1990	FBC Melgar		
1991	Sporting Cristal		

Managerial career
- 2009: Unión Minas (Orcopampa)
- 2011: FBC Aurora
- 2016: FBC Piérola
- 2025: FBC Piérola
- * Club domestic league appearances and goals

Juvenal Briceño Ramos (born on 11 December 1965) is a Peruvian football manager and former player.

== Playing career ==
Juvenal Briceño began his career with FBC Melgar of Arequipa in 1984. The top scorer in the 1986 Peruvian Championship with 16 goals, he joined Universitario de Deportes in 1987 and won the league title that same year. He played in two Copa Libertadores tournaments with Universitario de Deportes (1988 and 1989), making 13 appearances and scoring three goals.

He briefly returned to FBC Melgar in 1990 before moving to Sporting Cristal in 1991, at the request of Juan Carlos Oblitas, who had previously coached him at Universitario de Deportes. However, his playing career ended abruptly at the age of 25 when he lost a leg in a motorcycle accident.

== Managerial career ==
Briceño mainly manages clubs from his hometown of Arequipa including FBC Aurora and FBC Piérola.

== Honours ==
=== Player ===
FBC Melgar

- Torneo Descentralizado Top scorer: 1986 (16 goals)

Universitario de Deportes

- Torneo Descentralizado: 1987

Sporting Cristal

- Torneo Descentralizado: 1991
