= Los Espartanos de Pacasmayo =

Los Espartanos
- Full name: Los Espartanos de Pacasmayo
- Founded: 1924
- Ground: Pacasmayo province, Peru
- Manager: Carlos Vera
Home colours

Los Espartanos is a Peruvian football club, located in the city of Pacasmayo, La Libertad. The club was founded with the name of club Los Espartanos de Pacasmayo.

== History ==
The club was 1984 Copa Perú champion, when it defeated Alianza Atlético, Deportivo Educación, Bella Esperanza, Guardia Republicana, and Universitario (Tacna) in the Final Stage.

The club has played at the highest level of Peruvian football on two occasions, from 1985 Torneo Descentralizado until 1986 Torneo Descentralizado when it was relegated to the Copa Perú.

== Honours ==
=== National ===
- Copa Perú: 1
  - Winners (1): 1984

=== Regional ===
- Liga Departamental de La Libertad:
  - Winners (1): 1983
  - Runners-up (1): 2005
- Liga Provincial de Pacasmayo:
  - Winners (7): 1966, 1968, 1971, 1972, 1978, 1979, 1983
- Liga Distrital de Pacasmayo:
  - Runners-up (1): 2016

== See also ==
- List of football clubs in Peru
- Peruvian football league system
