= Hungaritos Agustinos =

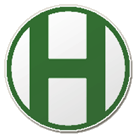
- Full name: Club Social Deportivo Hungaritos Agustinos
- Nicknames: La Máquina Neopuskiana Tropical, Los Verdes
- Founded: June 5, 1954
- Ground: Estadio Max Augustin, Iquitos
- Capacity: 24,576
- League: Copa Perú
Home colours	Away colours

Club Deportivo Hungaritos Agustinos is a Peruvian football club, playing in the city of Iquitos, Peru.

The club played at the highest level of Peruvian football in 1986.

== History ==
=== Foundation and Early Years ===
Hungaritos Agustinos traces its origins back to the 1950s. During those years, inside San Agustín School in Iquitos, physical education teacher Zavala formed a youth team that quickly earned a reputation for being unbeatable, playing matches in different venues without finding an opponent capable of defeating them.

Some years later, the remarkable success of the Hungary national team — regarded as one of the best in the world at the time and led by stars such as Ferenc Puskás, Sándor Kocsis, and Zoltán Czibor — inspired Augustinian priest and sports journalist Silvino Treceño Ríos to officially found Club Social Deportivo Hungaritos Agustinos on June 5, 1954. The club’s name was chosen as a tribute to that legendary Hungarian side that dazzled the football world during the 1954 FIFA World Cup in Switzerland.

=== Rise and Golden Era ===
In 1975, Fr. Silvino Treceño registered the club in the Third Division of the Liga Distrital de Iquitos. Hungaritos won the championship in its debut season and earned promotion to the Second Division, where it remained until 1978, when it secured promotion to the top district tier. From then on, the club established itself as one of the most competitive teams in the city, achieving several strong campaigns and runner-up finishes.

The club’s greatest achievement came in 1985, when it assembled a solid and highly competitive squad. That year, Hungaritos won its district league undefeated and maintained its unbeaten run throughout the different stages of the Copa Perú. Its historic campaign ended with the national title after a commanding victory in a playoff match against Tejidos La Unión from Jesús María.

The formidable group was championed by Haaker Tello Paredes and managed by Henry Perales. Key players included Marden Macedo, Arturo Ramírez, Román Flores, Francisco Sánchez, Esteban Angulo, Mario Meléndez, Raúl Guimet, Otto Gonzáles, Adriel Cardama, Edgar Ferreyra, Francisco Sandoval, Rafael Rengifo, Américo Piera, Jorge Orbe, Óscar Calvo, Jorge Navas, Jaime Fernández, Manuel D’Acevedo, William Díaz, and Pedro Bucceli.

=== First Division and Decline ===
After winning the Copa Perú, Hungaritos Agustinos spent three seasons in the Peruvian First Division. In 1986, the team was coached by Miguel Company, while in 1987 the managerial duties were assumed first by Henry Perales and later by Jesús Paz Oré. However, the club was relegated in 1988 and subsequently entered a steady sporting decline, dropping through the district divisions before eventually going into a prolonged hiatus.

=== Recent Comebacks ===
In 2007, the club reappeared after registering in the Third Division of the Liga Distrital de Iquitos, although it only participated for that season. Its definitive return came in 2016, when it achieved promotion to the district Second Division.

Two years later, in 2018, Hungaritos won the championship in that category and returned to the district First Division, where it competed until 2022. However, before the start of the 2023 season, the club withdrew from the competition and was automatically relegated to the district Second Division. Since then, Hungaritos Agustinos has not participated in official tournaments.

== Honours ==
=== Senior titles ===
Keys

- Record
- ^{(s)} Shared record

Type	Competition	Titles	Runner-up	Winning years	Runner-up years
National (League)	Copa Perú	1	—	1985	—
Regional (League)	Liga Departamental de Loreto	1	—	1984	—
Regional (League)	Liga Provincial de Maynas	1	—	1984	—
Regional (League)	Liga Distrital de Iquitos	1	—	1984	—
