= Sport Pilsen Callao =

Sport Pilsen
- Full name: Club Sport Pilsen Callao
- Founded: 1924
- Ground: Guadalupe, La Libertad, Peru
- League: Copa Perú
Home colours

Sport Pilsen is a Peruvian football club, located in the city of Guadalupe, La Libertad. The club was founded with the name of club Sport Pilsen Callao, the club won the Peru Cup 1983 and played in Primera Division Peruana from 1984 until 1985.

== History ==
Its official name was Club Deportivo Sport Pilsen Callao de Guadalupe, although it was popularly known simply as Sport Pilsen. Founded in 1924, the club established itself as one of the main protagonists of the district leagues in the city of Guadalupe, although for several decades it failed to progress to the decisive stages of the Copa Perú. However, the institution's history changed dramatically in 1983.

That year, after overcoming the different qualifying rounds, Sport Pilsen reached the National Stage of the Copa Perú alongside 23 other teams representing the various departments of the country. The tournament was played under a geographically divided format with successive knockout rounds, eventually determining the six teams that qualified for the Finalísima, where the Guadalupe side secured its place.

That historic squad featured Carlos Anastacio, Felipe Díaz, Herbert Baygorria, Juan Paredes, Carlos Sanjinez, William Espinoza, José Suárez, Walter Caldas, Luis Camacho, Juan Vera, and Germán Garagay.

In the Finalísima, Sport Pilsen defeated Barcelona de Surquillo, Cienciano, Deportivo Cañaña, Juventud La Joya, and Real Madrid de Camaná to win the 1983 Copa Perú title and earn promotion to the Peruvian First Division. The club remained in the top flight from 1984 to 1985, before participating in the 1985 Intermedia tournament, where it failed to retain its status and returned to Copa Perú competition.

It was during the 1984 season, specifically on 1 November of that year, that the club suffered the heaviest defeat ever recorded in the history of the Peruvian First Division, losing 11–0 to Alianza Lima.

In 1986, the club competed in the Regional Stage of the Copa Perú under the name Club Deportivo Guardia Civil after receiving support from that state institution in its hometown. However, it was eliminated during that stage. Later, in 1987 and 1988, the club won the Liga Provincial de Pacasmayo, qualifying in both seasons for the Liga Departamental de La Libertad, although it was unable to progress beyond the Costa Zone eliminations.

In the following years, Sport Pilsen continued competing in its local league until its eventual disappearance.

== Honours ==
=== Senior titles ===
Keys

- Record
- ^{(s)} Shared record

Type	Competition	Titles	Runner-up	Winning years	Runner-up years
National (League)	Copa Perú	1	—	1983	—
Regional (League)	Liga Departamental de La Libertad	1	1	1982	1980
Regional (League)	Liga Provincial de Pacasmayo	5	—	1980, 1981, 1982, 1987, 1988	—
Regional (League)	Liga Distrital de Guadalupe	5	1	1980, 1981, 1982, 1987, 1988	1977

== See also ==
- List of football clubs in Peru
- Peruvian football league system
