= 1984 Copa Perú =

Copa Perú
- Season: 1984
- Champions: Los Espartanos
- Top goalscorer: Carrasco and Luna (6)

The 1984 Copa Perú season (Spanish: Copa Perú 1984), the promotion tournament of Peruvian football.

In this tournament after many qualification rounds, each one of the 24 departments in which Peru is politically divided, qualify a team. Those teams enter in the Regional round (8 groups) by geographical proximity. Some winners went to the Division Intermedia and some others with some runners-up went to the National round and then to the Final round, staged in Lima (the capital).

The champion was promoted to 1985 Torneo Descentralizado.

== Finalists teams ==
The following list shows the teams that qualified for the Final Stage.

Department	Team	Location
Apurímac	Deportivo Educación	Apurímac
La Libertad	Los Espartanos	Pacasmayo
Lima	Bella Esperanza	Cerro Azul
Lima	Guardia Republicana	Lima
Piura	Alianza Atlético	Sullana
Tacna	Universitario de Tacna	Tacna

== Final stage ==
=== Standings ===
Pos	Team	Pld	W	D	L	GF	GA	GD	Pts	Promotion
1	Los Espartanos (C)	5	5	0	0	9	3	+6	10	1985 Torneo Descentralizado
2	Alianza Atlético	5	3	1	1	9	6	+3	7	
3	Universitario de Tacna	5	2	1	2	6	6	0	5	
4	Guardia Republicana	5	1	1	3	5	5	0	3	
5	Deportivo Educación	5	1	1	3	3	9	−6	3	
6	Bella Esperanza	5	0	2	3	4	7	−3	2	

(C) Champions

=== Results ===
==== Round 1 ====
2 December 1984	Alianza Atlético	3–2	Universitario de Tacna	Nacional, Lima

2 December 1984	Los Espartanos	1–0	Bella Esperanza	Nacional, Lima

2 December 1984	Guardia Republicana	3–0	Deportivo Educación	Nacional, Lima

==== Round 2 ====
5 December 1984	Los Espartanos	1–0	Alianza Atlético	Nacional, Lima

5 December 1984	Universitario de Tacna	0–0	Deportivo Educación	Nacional, Lima

5 December 1984	Guardia Republicana	0–0	Bella Esperanza	Nacional, Lima

==== Round 3 ====
9 December 1984	Alianza Atlético	2–2	Bella Esperanza	Nacional, Lima

9 December 1984	Universitario de Tacna	1–0	Guardia Republicana	Nacional, Lima

9 December 1984	Los Espartanos	2–0	Deportivo Educación	Nacional, Lima

==== Round 4 ====
12 December 1984	Deportivo Educación	2–1	Bella Esperanza	Nacional, Lima

12 December 1984	Alianza Atlético	1–0	Guardia Republicana	Nacional, Lima

12 December 1984	Los Espartanos	2–1	Universitario de Tacna	Nacional, Lima

==== Round 5 ====
16 December 1984	Universitario de Tacna	2–1	Bella Esperanza	Nacional, Lima

16 December 1984	Alianza Atlético	3–1	Deportivo Educación	Nacional, Lima

16 December 1984	Los Espartanos	3–2	Guardia Republicana	Nacional, Lima
