= Asociación Deportiva San Agustín =

Peruvian football club

San Agustín
- Full name: Asociación Deportiva San Agustín
- Nickname: Los canarios
- Founded: 1970; 56 years ago as San Francisco; 1972; 54 years ago as Huracán San Francisco; 1983; 43 years ago as Huracán San Agustín; 1984; 42 years ago as Club Deportivo San Agustín. 2011; 15 years ago as Asociación Deportiva San Agustín
- Ground: Estadio Nacional; Lima, Peru
- Capacity: 45,000
Home colours	Away colours

San Agustín is a Peruvian football club, located in the city of Lima. The club was founded on August 9, 1970, with the name of club San Francisco, later was renamed Huracán Agustín and finally received its final name after becoming sponsored by the Colegio San Agustin.

== History ==
=== Early Years ===
Club Deportivo San Agustín was founded on August 9, 1970, under the name Club San Francisco in the San Eugenio neighborhood of the Lince.

In 1972, the club was initially renamed Huracán San Francisco after relocating its headquarters to the district of San Isidro. In 1981, they competed in the Liga Mayor de Fútbol de Lima, finishing as runners-up.

In 1983, they acquired Huracán San Isidro and took part as an invited team in the 1983 Peruvian Segunda División under the name Huracán San Agustín, finishing second behind Unión González Prada.

From 1984 onward, the club adopted its definitive name, Club Deportivo San Agustín, after coming under the sponsorship of San Agustín School, led by Father Cesáreo Fernández de las Cuevas, who was the architect behind one of the most remarkable teams in the history of Peruvian football.

=== Promotion to the First Division ===
In 1984, they were unsuccessful in the Segunda División. However, that same year the 1984 Intermedia was created. Based on their league position, they competed in the Intermedio “B” group and advanced to the Promotion Playoff (Liguilla de Promoción), where they secured one of the two available promotion spots.

=== First Division ===
The club was the 1986 Torneo Descentralizado champion, when it defeated Alianza Lima in the finals.

The club has played at the highest level of Peruvian football on twelve occasions, from 1985 Torneo Descentralizado until 1996 Torneo Descentralizado, when it was relegated.

=== Revival ===
After 13 years of inactivity, the club returned to competition on January 11, 2011, under the name Asociación Deportiva San Agustín. They entered the Liga Distrital de Lince, winning the 2011 title and qualifying for the Interligas de Lima, where they were eliminated by Juventud América.

In 2012, San Agustín once again won the Liga Distrital de Lince and advanced to the Interligas qualifying rounds, but were knocked out by Atlético Tornado in the fourth phase of the Interligas. For the 2015 season, the club were crowned Liga Distrital de Lince champions again and qualified for the Interligas de Lima. They competed in the first phase but were eliminated by the other teams in their group: Social Pacífico, Juventud Santa Rosa, and ADC Jungla.

They won the 2016 Liga Distrital de Lince title, securing qualification for that year's Interligas. After defeating Real Club de Lima 4–0, they reached the fourth phase, where they were eliminated in the group stage by Cultural Progreso.

For the 2017 season, the club chose not to participate, as the Liga Distrital de Lince was being held in a different district of the capital, far from its traditional base. Since then, the club has not competed in official tournaments.

== Club names ==
Season	Club name
1970–1982	San Francisco
1983	Huracán San Agustín
1984–1998	C.D. San Agustín
2011–2016	A.D. San Agustín
2025	C.D. San Agustín

== Honours ==
=== Senior titles ===
Keys

- Record
- ^{(s)} Shared record

Type	Competition	Titles	Runner-up	Winning years	Runner-up years
National (League)	Primera División	1	—	1986	—
National (League)	Intermedia (1984–1987)	2	—	1984 Intermedia B, 1985 Intermedia A	—
Half-year / Short tournament (League)	Torneo Regional	1	—	1986	—
Half-year / Short tournament (League)	Torneo Descentralizado	—	1	—	1986
Half-year / Short tournament (League)	Torneo Zona Metropolitana	—	1	—	1988 Grupo A
Regional (League)	Liga Distrital de Lince	6	—	2011, 2012, 2013, 2014, 2015, 2016	—
Regional (League)	Liga Distrital de San Isidro	1	—	1977	—

== Performance in CONMEBOL competitions ==
- Copa Libertadores: 1 appearance

1987: Group Stage

== Statistics and results in First Division ==
=== League history ===
Season	Div.	Pos.	Pl.	W	D	L	GF	GA	P	Notes
1985	1st	–	22	3	12	7	26	29	18	11/12 Torneo Regional - Grupo Metropolitano
1986	1st	1	42	22	11	9	53	28	55	3/12 Torneo Regional - Grupo Metropolitano, 1/11 Liguilla Regional, 2/6 Torneo Descentralizado - Grupo B, 2/6 Liguilla
1987	1st	–	57	19	18	20	63	64	56	3/12 Torneo Regional - Grupo Metropolitano, 3/6 Liguilla Regional, 13/6 Torneo Descentralizado
1988	1st	–	40	13	13	14	42	57	39	2/6 Torneo Regional - Grupo Metropolitano A, 5/6 Liguilla Regional, 10/12 Torneo Descentralizado
1989	1st	–	23	4	10	9	18	35	18	8/11 Torneo Regional I - Grupo Metropolitano, 11/11 Torneo Regional II - Grupo Metropolitano, 1/2 Promotion/Relegation Playoff
1990	1st	–	33	6	16	11	24	33	28	7/12 Torneo Regional I - Grupo Metropolitano, 8/12 Torneo Regional II - Grupo Metropolitano
1991	1st	–	33	13	9	11	39	33	35	7/12 Torneo Regional I - Grupo Metropolitano, 6/12 Torneo Regional II - Grupo Metropolitano
1992	1st	13	30	7	12	11	34	45	33	13/16 Regular Season
1993	1st	10	30	9	8	13	31	50	26	10/16 Regular Season
1994	1st	12	30	8	8	14	36	48	24	12/16 Regular Season
1995	1st	8	44	14	11	19	53	72	53	8/16 Regular Season
1996	1st	16	30	4	4	22	27	62	16	16/16 Regular Season

== Notable managers ==
- (Peru) Fernando Cuéllar (1985–1987, 1994)

== Notable players ==
- (Peru) Martín Yupanqui (1982–1988, 1990–1992)
- (Peru) Roberto Martínez Vera-Tudela (1985–1986)
- (Peru) Jaime Duarte (1986–1987)
- (Peru) José del Solar (1986–1987)
- (Peru) Roberto Mosquera (1986, 1989)
- (Peru) Freddy Ternero (1986)
- (Peru) Carlos Silvestri (1991–1996)
- (Peru) Fidel Suárez (1994)
- (Peru) Antonio Serrano (1996–1997)
- (Peru) Guillermo Salas (1994–1996)

== See also ==
- List of football clubs in Peru
- Peruvian football league system
