= César Adriazola =

Peruvian footballer and manager (born 1956)

Personal information
- Full name: César Augusto Adriazola Delgado
- Date of birth: 10 June 1956 (age 70)
- Place of birth: Mollendo, Peru
- Height: 1.80 m (5 ft 11 in)
- Position: Left-back

Senior career*
Years	Team	Apps	(Gls)
1976	Pesca Perú (Mollendo)		
1977–1980	Universitario		
1981–1982	León de Huánuco		
1983–1985	CNI		
1986	Deportivo Municipal		
1987	Sporting Cristal		
1988	Cienciano		
1989	FBC Aurora		
1990–1993	FBC Melgar		

International career
1985	Peru	1	(0)

Managerial career
- FBC Aurora
- FBC Piérola
- 2010: León de Huánuco (reserves)
- Universitario (youth teams)
- 2011: U América FC
- * Club domestic league appearances and goals

César Augusto Adriazola Delgado (born 10 June 1956) is a Peruvian footballer who played as a left-back.

== Biography ==
=== Club career ===
Nicknamed Huevo (the egg), César Adriazola played in the 1976 Copa Perú final with Pesca Perú from his hometown of Mollendo. Transferred to Universitario of Lima, he made his debut in the Peruvian first division on 27 March 1977. He became an undisputed starter at left-back the following year under Roberto Scarone and scored his first goal for Universitario on 9 September 1978. In 1979, he played in the Copa Libertadores (6 matches, 2 goals).

In 1981, he left Universitario and signed with León de Huánuco. Then, in 1983, he joined CNI of Iquitos, where he had several successful seasons, earning him a call-up to the Peruvian national team for a friendly match against Bolivia on 17 February 1985. This would be his only appearance for the national team.

In 1986, he returned to Lima to play for Deportivo Municipal (1986) and then Sporting Cristal (1987). He finished his career with clubs in Arequipa: FBC Aurora in 1989 and then FBC Melgar between 1990 and 1993.

=== Managerial career ===
Adriazola dedicated himself to coaching and managed teams in the Copa Perú, coaching Arequipa clubs such as FBC Aurora and FBC Piérola. He also took charge of León de Huánuco's reserve team in 2010. Later, he worked with Universitario's youth teams. Unfortunately, he experienced relegation from the Second Division to the Copa Perú with U América FC in 2011.
