= Genaro Neyra =

Peruvian footballer (born 1952)

Personal information
- Date of birth: 8 October 1956 (age 70)
- Place of birth: Camaná, Peru

International career
Years	Team	Apps	(Gls)
1983	Peru	2	(0)

Genaro Neyra (born 8 October 1956) is a Peruvian footballer. He played in two matches for the Peru national football team in 1983. He was also part of Peru's squad for the 1983 Copa América tournament.
