= Deportivo Pucallpa =

- Full name: Club Deportivo Pucallpa
- Founded: 1946
- Ground: Aliardo Soria Pérez, Pucallpa
- Capacity: 15,000
- League: Copa Perú
Home colours	Away colours

Deportivo Pucallpa is a Peruvian football club, playing in the city of Pucallpa, Ucayali, Peru.

== History ==
They were originally called Deportivo COOPTRIP, and played in the 1985 Torneo Descentralizado.

The club participated in 1985 Torneo Descentralizado until 1986 Torneo Descentralizado, when it was relegated. Deportivo Pucallpa was the 1986 Central Zone winner and qualified to Liguilla Regional but was eliminated by San Agustín.

== Rivalries ==
Deportivo Pucallpa has had a long-standing rivalry with local club Deportivo Bancos.

== Honours ==
=== National ===
- Liga Distrital de Callería: 1

Winners (1): 2011

== Role in 1987 Alianza Lima plane crash ==
In the 1987 Alianza Lima plane crash, Alianza Lima were flying to Lima from Pucallpa after an away match at the club in the Torneo Descentralizado.

== See also ==
- List of football clubs in Peru
- Peruvian football league system
