= Juventud La Joya =

- Full name: Club Juventud La Joya
- Founded: August 30, 1971
- Ground: Estadio Rómulo Shaw Cisneros, Chancay District, Huaral
- League: Copa Perú
Home colours	Away colours	Third colours

Juventud La Joya is a Peruvian football club, playing in the city of Chancay District, Huaral, Lima, Peru.

== History ==
The club was founded on the Chancay District, Huaral, Lima.

Juventud La Joya played in the 1983 Copa Perú, but remained in the fourth place.

The club participated in the Peruvian Primera División, since 1985 Torneo Descentralizado until 1988 Torneo Descentralizado. In the 1987 Torneo Descentralizado, the club merged with the Centro Iqueño, to form the team La Joya–Iqueño.

In 1989, Juventud La Joya sold the category to the Meteor, and participated until 1990 Torneo Descentralizado.

In 1991 Segunda División, the club merged with Lawn Tennis, to form the team Meteor–Lawn Tennis until 1994.

In 1998 Segunda División, the club merged with Deportivo Junín, to form the team Meteor–Junín until 1999, when it was relegated to the Copa Perú.

Currently, Juventud La Joya play in the Liga Distrital de Asia.

== Honours ==
=== Regional ===
- Liga Departamental de Lima
  - Winners (1): 1982
- Liga Provincial de Huaral
  - Winners (1): 1982
- Liga Distrital de Chancay
  - Winners (1): 1982

== See also ==
- List of football clubs in Peru
- Peruvian football league system
