= Chanchamayo FC =

Football club based in Chanchamayo, Peru

Chanchamayo F.C.
- Full name: Chanchamayo Fútbol Club
- Founded: 1979
- Ground: Estadio Huancayo, Huancayo
- Capacity: 15,000
- Chairman: Eugenio Chiong Olivares
- Manager: Mario Flores and José Rodríguez
- League: Copa Perú
Home colours	Away colours

Chanchamayo Fútbol Club is a Peruvian football club, playing in the city of Chanchamayo, Junín, Peru.

== History ==
The club was founded as Club Social Deportivo Hostal Rey and played in the Primera Division Peruana in 1984 until 1985.

In 1985, the club changed his name to Chanchamayo FC.

In the following years, Chanchamayo FC played in the La Merced District League. In 2009, led by the coaching duo of Mario "El Chato" Flores and José "Lulo" Rodríguez, they were eliminated in the semifinals of the Provincial Stage by Deportivo Municipal de Perené. In the following decade, they ceased to participate and disappeared.

== See also ==
- List of football clubs in Peru
- Peruvian football league system
