= Atlético Huracán de Moquegua =

Huracán
- Full name: Club Atlético Huracán de Moquegua
- Founded: 26 July 1958
- Ground: Estadio Héroes de Estuquiña, Moquegua
- Capacity: 3,000
- League: Copa Perú
- 2017: National Stage
Home colours	Away colours

Huracán is a Peruvian football club, playing in the city of Moquegua, Peru.

The club was founded on 26 July 1958 and plays in the Copa Perú, which is the third division of the Peruvian league.

== History ==
The club has played at the highest level of Peruvian football on six occasions, from 1985 Torneo Descentralizado until 1990 Torneo Descentralizado, when it was relegated.

== Honours ==
=== Regional ===
- Liga Departamental de Moquegua:

Winners (11): 1966, 1967, 1983,1984, 1994, 1995, 1996, 1997, 2005, 2010, 2011
Runner-up (3): 2008, 2015, 2017

- Liga Provincial de Mariscal Nieto:

Winners (6): 1967, 2003, 2009, 2010, 2015, 2016

- Liga Distrital de Moquegua:

Winners (7): 1960, 1967, 2009, 2011, 2014, 2015, 2017
Runner-up (6): 2010, 2016, 2018, 2023, 2024, 2026

== See also ==
- List of football clubs in Peru
- Peruvian football league system
