= José Crespo y Castillo District =

Coordinates: 8.9314°S 76.1305°W

José Crespo y Castillo
- District
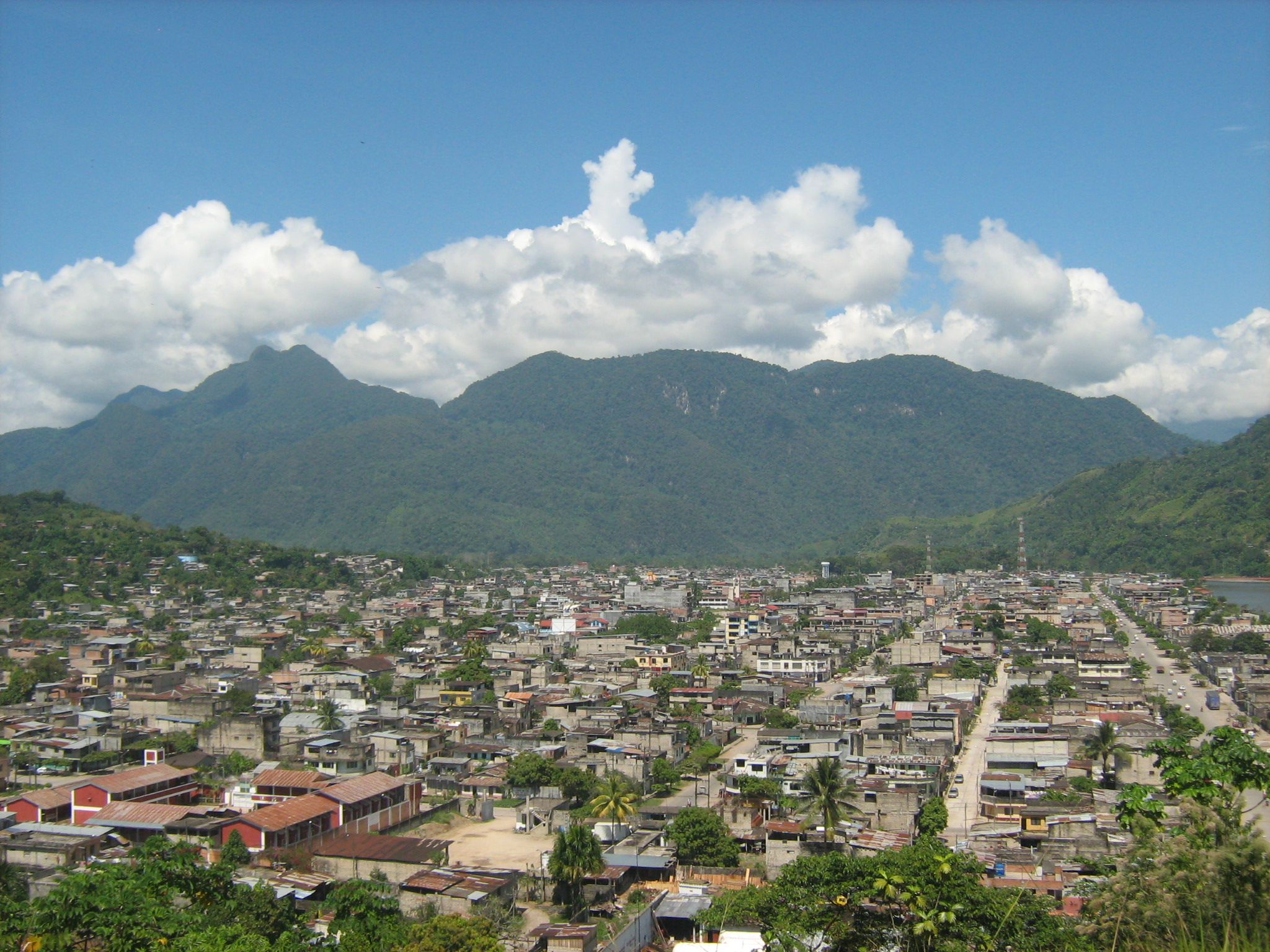
- View of Sumaq Puñuq (La Bella Durmiente), a limestone mountain range in the shape of a sleeping woman in Tingo María National Park, José Crespo y Castillo District
- Interactive map of José Crespo y Castillo
- Country: Peru
- Region: Huánuco
- Province: Leoncio Prado
- Founded: December 26, 1963
- Capital: Aucayacu

Area
  - Total: 2,829.67 km^{2} (1,092.54 sq mi)
- Elevation: 540 m (1,770 ft)

Population (2005 census)
  - Total: 30,007
  - Density: 10.604/km^{2} (27.465/sq mi)
- Time zone: UTC-5 (PET)
- UBIGEO: 100604

José Crespo y Castillo District is one of six districts of the province Leoncio Prado in Peru.

== Climate ==
Climate data for Aucayacu, Jose Crespo Y Castillo, elevation 586 m (1,923 ft), (1991–2020)
Month	Jan	Feb	Mar	Apr	May	Jun	Jul	Aug	Sep	Oct	Nov	Dec	Year
Mean daily maximum °C (°F)	29.6 (85.3)	29.4 (84.9)	29.6 (85.3)	30.3 (86.5)	30.3 (86.5)	30.0 (86.0)	30.1 (86.2)	30.8 (87.4)	31.0 (87.8)	30.6 (87.1)	30.6 (87.1)	30.0 (86.0)	30.2 (86.3)
Mean daily minimum °C (°F)	21.1 (70.0)	21.1 (70.0)	21.2 (70.2)	21.0 (69.8)	20.7 (69.3)	20.2 (68.4)	19.4 (66.9)	19.5 (67.1)	19.9 (67.8)	20.3 (68.5)	21.1 (70.0)	21.1 (70.0)	20.6 (69.0)
Average precipitation mm (inches)	429.4 (16.91)	390.2 (15.36)	383.5 (15.10)	263.0 (10.35)	217.1 (8.55)	212.7 (8.37)	153.7 (6.05)	127.6 (5.02)	163.6 (6.44)	285.5 (11.24)	333.6 (13.13)	451.6 (17.78)	3,411.5 (134.3)
Source: National Meteorology and Hydrology Service of Peru

Climate data for Tulumayo, Jose Crespo Y Castillo, elevation 612 m (2,008 ft), (1991–2020)
Month	Jan	Feb	Mar	Apr	May	Jun	Jul	Aug	Sep	Oct	Nov	Dec	Year
Mean daily maximum °C (°F)	30.1 (86.2)	29.7 (85.5)	30.1 (86.2)	30.6 (87.1)	30.4 (86.7)	30.0 (86.0)	30.1 (86.2)	31.1 (88.0)	31.6 (88.9)	31.5 (88.7)	31.3 (88.3)	30.4 (86.7)	30.6 (87.0)
Mean daily minimum °C (°F)	20.9 (69.6)	20.8 (69.4)	20.7 (69.3)	20.6 (69.1)	20.5 (68.9)	19.7 (67.5)	19.0 (66.2)	19.0 (66.2)	19.5 (67.1)	20.2 (68.4)	20.8 (69.4)	20.9 (69.6)	20.2 (68.4)
Average precipitation mm (inches)	292.4 (11.51)	285.0 (11.22)	251.7 (9.91)	170.3 (6.70)	140.4 (5.53)	117.9 (4.64)	96.3 (3.79)	74.0 (2.91)	100.4 (3.95)	169.0 (6.65)	236.1 (9.30)	282.7 (11.13)	2,216.2 (87.24)
Source: National Meteorology and Hydrology Service of Peru
