= Estadio E. Torres Belón =

Estadio Enrique Torres Belón
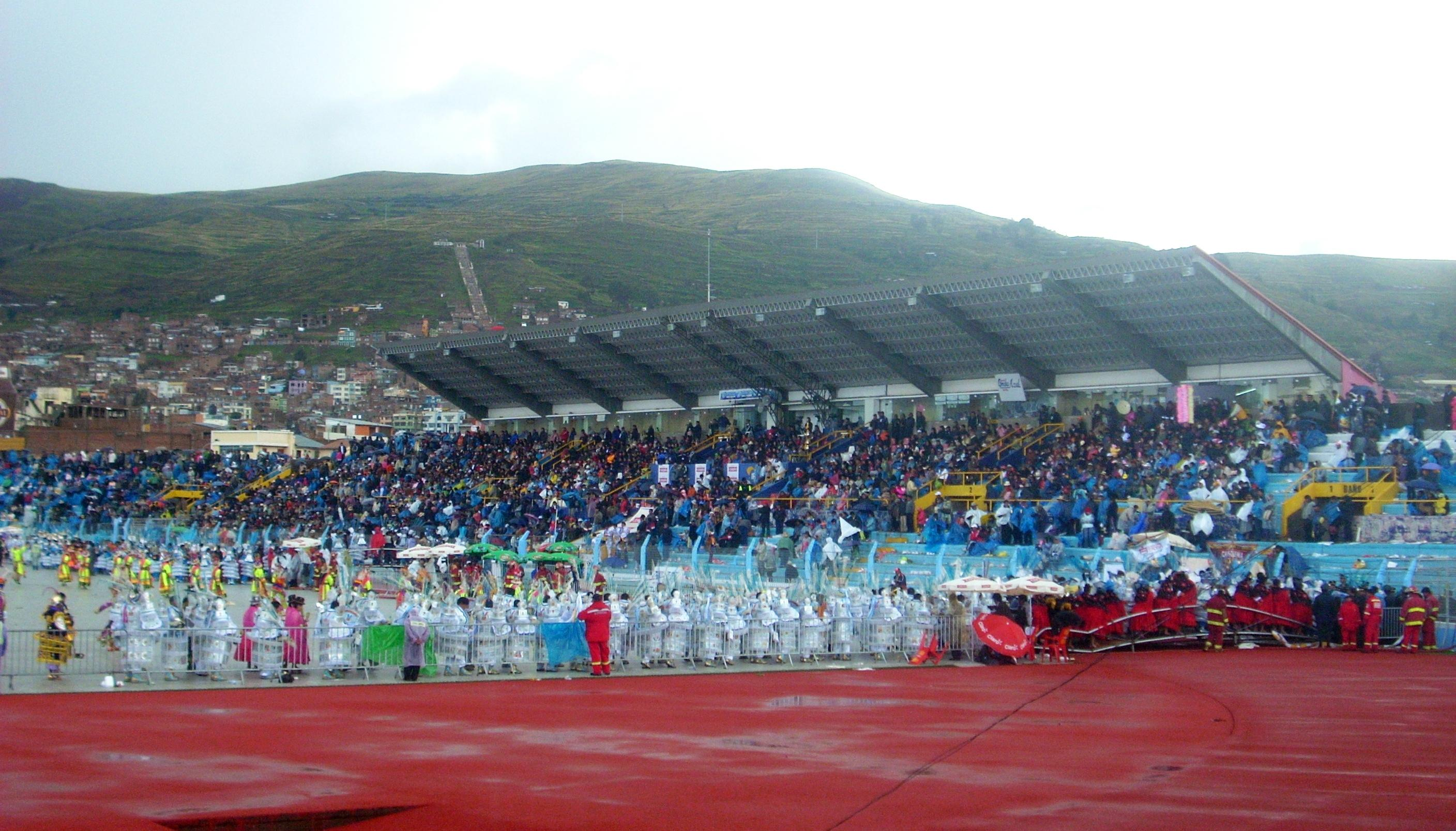
- Interactive map of Estadio Enrique Torres Belón
- Full name: Estadio Enrique Torres Belón
- Location: Puno, Peru
- Coordinates: 15.83691°S 70.022028°W
- Capacity: 20,000
- Surface: grass
- Field size: 105 × 70 m

Construction
- Opened: 1963

Tenant
- Alfonso Ugarte

Estadio Enrique Torres Belón is a multi-purpose stadium in Puno, Peru. It is currently used by football team Alfonso Ugarte. The stadium is built out of stone and has a capacity of 20,000 people. It is named after Senator Enrique Torres Belón from the Puno Region. The stadium is also the site of the Fiesta de la Candelaria every February.
