= List of FBC Melgar seasons =

List of FBC Melgar Seasons in the Peruvian football league

This is a list of seasons played by FBC Melgar in Peruvian and South American football, from 1966 (the year of the club's first participated in the Peruvian Primera División) and 1971 (the year of the club won their first title in the 1971 Copa Perú) to the most recent completed season. FBC Melgar was founded in March 25, 1915, as Juventud Melgar by a group of young football fans in Arequipa. The name was chosen in honor of the poet Mariano Melgar. The club would take part in their first championship in 1918, the Liga Distrital de Arequipa (at that time, the Liga Provincial de Arequipa).

The club has won the Peruvian Primera División Two times, has played Torneos Internationals CONMEBOL: The Copa CONMEBOL, the Copa Sudamericana and the Copa Libertadores. and the club has no been relegated from that won the 1971 Copa Perú title of the Peru's top division.

This list details the club's achievements in all competitions, and the top scorers for each season (where the information is available). Top scorers in bold were also the top scorers in the Peruvian Primera División that season.

== Key ==
Key to colors and symbols

1st or W	Winners
2nd or RU	Runners-up
3rd	Third place
Pro. ↑	Promoted ↑
Rel. ↓	Relegated ↓
CP	Copa Perú (CP)
1dd	1° División Distrital
2dd	2° División Distrital
♦	League top scorer

Key to league record

- Season = The year and article of the season
- League = League name
- Pld = Games played
- W = Games won
- L = Games lost
- D = Games drawn
- GF = Goals for
- GA = Goals against
- GD = Goal difference
- Pts = Points
- Pos = Regular season position
- Play-offs = Play-offs position

Key to national cups record

- — = Competition not held or canceled
- DNE = Did not enter
- DNQ = Did not qualify
- QR = Qualifying round
- PR = Preliminary round
- GS = Group stage
- R1 = First round
- R2 = Second round
- R3 = Third round
- R4 = Fourth round
- R5 = Fifth round
- Ro16 = Round of 16
- QF = Quarter-finals
- SF = Semi-finals
- F = Final
- RU = Runners-up
- W = Winners

== Seasons ==
=== National Championship Era (1966–present) ===
Season	League									Position		National Cups		Continental / Other	Tournament Top goalscorer(s)	
Season	Competition	Pld	W	D	L	GF	GA	DG	Pts	Pos	Play-offs (Note: Since 1966, play-off games have been used as a tie breaker between teams tie on points for promotion or relegation or as a post-season stage to decide the national championship. Whenever they have occurred, the club's position on that stage is shown in this column.)	National Cups		Continental / Other	Name(s)	Goals
1966	Torneo Descentralizado	26	12	4	10	43	30	+13	28	8th	—	—	—	DNQ	Eduardo Márquez	14
1967	Copa Perú	—								CP	—			DNQ	Eduardo Márquez	12
1967	Regional Stage	6	4	2	0	14	4	+10	10	1st	PR	—	—	DNQ	Eduardo Márquez	12
1967	Final Stage	5	2	1	2	10	3	+7	5	4th	—	—	—	DNQ	Eduardo Márquez	12
1967	Distrital Stage	—								1dd	—			DNQ	Eduardo Márquez	14
1967	Torneo de Selección y Competencia	18	12	6	0	44	6	+38	30	1st	—	—	—	DNQ	Eduardo Márquez	**26**
1968	Copa Perú	—								CP	—			DNQ	Eduardo Márquez	12
1968	Departmental Stage	6	6	0	0	23	2	+21	12	1st	—	—	—	DNQ	Eduardo Márquez	12
1968	Regional Stage	4	2	2	0	10	2	+8	6	1st	—	—	—	DNQ	Eduardo Márquez	12
1968	Final Stage	5	1	1	3	5	7	-2	3	5th	—	—	—	DNQ	Eduardo Márquez	12
1968	Distrital Stage	—								1dd	—			DNQ	Eduardo Márquez	17
1968	Torneo de Selección y Competencia	18	13	4	1	56	17	+39	30	1st	—	—	—	DNQ	Eduardo Márquez	**29**
1969	Copa Perú	—								CP	—			DNQ	Eduardo Márquez	23
1969	Departmental Stage	10	9	1	0	59	3	+56	19	1st	—	—	—	DNQ	Eduardo Márquez	23
1969	Regional Stage	4	4	0	0	11	1	+10	8	1st	—	—	—	DNQ	Eduardo Márquez	23
1969	Final Stage	5	4	0	1	7	2	+5	8	2nd	—	—	—	DNQ	Eduardo Márquez	23
1969	Distrital Stage	—								1dd	—			DNQ	Eduardo Márquez	14
1969	Torneo de Selección y Competencia	18	12	4	2	56	7	+49	28	1st	—	—	—	DNQ	Eduardo Márquez	**37**
1970	Copa Perú	—								CP	—	Copa Presidente de la República	GS, RU	DNQ	Eduardo Márquez	20
1970	Departmental Stage	10	7	3	0	47	4	+43	17	1st	—	—	—	DNQ	Eduardo Márquez	20
1970	Regional Stage	6	6	0	0	24	0	+24	12	1st	—	—	—	DNQ	Eduardo Márquez	20
1970	Final Stage	5	3	1	1	7	3	+4	7	2nd	—	—	—	DNQ	Eduardo Márquez	20
1970	Distrital Stage	—								1dd	—			DNQ	Víctor Rossell	10
1970	Torneo de Selección y Competencia First Stage	9	7	2	0	18	2	+16	16	1st	—	—	—	DNQ	Víctor Rossell	**22**
1970	Final Stage	13	10	2	1	23	6	+17	22	1st	—	—	—	DNQ	Víctor Rossell	**22**
1971	Copa Perú	—								CP	—			DNQ	Eduardo Márquez	21
1971	Departmental Stage Group A	4	3	0	1	10	1	+9	6	1st	—	—	—	DNQ	Eduardo Márquez	21
1971	Final Stage	3	3	0	0	22	0	+22	6	1st	—	—	—	DNQ	Eduardo Márquez	21
1971	Regional Stage	6	6	0	0	17	2	+15	12	1st	—	—	—	DNQ	Eduardo Márquez	21
1971	Final Stage	5	3	2	0	13	4	+9	8	1st	—	—	—	DNQ	Eduardo Márquez	21
1971	Torneo Descentralizado	—								1D	—			DNQ	—	
1971	Torneo Descentralizado League	30	10	14	6	40	30	+10	34	7th	—	—	—	DNQ	—	—
