= 1971 FBC Melgar season =

FBC Melgar
1971 season
- Stadium: Estadio Mariano Melgar
- Torneo de Selección y Competencia de Arequipa: Torneo de Selección y Competencia: First (1°); First in Arequipa (1°)
Home colours	Away colours	Third colours

The 1971 FBC Melgar season were the Fifty-Seventh (57.º) of the club from its foundation in 1915, Two (2) participations in the top-flight of Peruvian Primera División (of 55 Editions) with denomination Torneo Descentralizado. In Previous Season the club qualified as Runner-up 2nd Place of the 1970 Copa Perú National Stage.

Melgar were a of ten (10) clubs in the Nn edition (+1.º) Torneo de Selección y Competencia of Arequipa City, the competition in Copa Perú of the Peruvian football. The club played the Copa Perú for Fifth (5th) Time, in Season 1971 Liga Provincial (of 5 Editions), Liga Departamental de Arequipa (of 6 Editions), Región Sur (of 5 Editions), National stage (Copa Perú) (of 5 Editions) and Finally Peruvian Primera División for Second (2nd) Time.

== Copa Perú ==
=== National Stage ===
Pos	Team	Pld	W	D	L	GF	GA	GD	Pts
1	FBC Melgar (C)	5	3	2	0	13	4	+9	8
2	Unión Tumán	5	3	1	1	8	6	+2	7
3	José Gálvez FBC	5	3	1	1	6	7	-1	7

== See also ==
- FBC Melgar
- 1971 Copa Perú
- 1971 Torneo Descentralizado
