= 1967 FBC Melgar season =

FBC Melgar
1967 season
- Stadium: Estadio Mariano Melgar
- Torneo de Selección y Competencia de Arequipa: Torneo de Selección y Competencia: First (1°); First in Arequipa (1°)
Home colours	Away colours	Third colours

The 1967 FBC Melgar season were the Fifty-Third (53.º) of the club from its foundation in 1915, One (1) participation in the top-flight of Peruvian Primera División (of 51 Editions) with denomination Torneo Descentralizado. In Previous Season the club qualified as 8th Place of the 1966 Torneo Descentralizado.

Melgar were a of ten (10) clubs in the Nn edition (+1.º) Torneo de Selección y Competencia of Arequipa City, the competition in Copa Perú of the Peruvian football. The club played the Copa Perú for First (1st) Time, in Season 1967 Liga Distrital (of +1° Editions), Liga Provincial (First 1° Edition), Liga Departamental de Arequipa (of 2 Editions), Región Sur (First 1° Edition) and National stage (Copa Perú) (First 1° Edition).

== Copa Perú ==
=== Liga Distrital de Arequipa ===
Torneo de Selección y Competencia

Pos	Team	Pld	W	D	L	GF	GA	GD	Pts
1	FBC Melgar	18	12	6	0	44	6	+38	30
2	Sportivo Huracán	18	10	5	3	32	17	+15	25
3	Atlético Universidad	18	7	7	4	30	21	+9	21

== See also ==
- FBC Melgar
- 1967 Copa Perú
