= 1965 Ligas Distritales del Peru =

1965 Peruvian football districts

Ligas Distritales del Peru
- Season: 1965
- Champions: Alfonso Ugarte de Chiclín (Trujillo); Atlético Grau (Piura); Melgar (Arequipa); Octavio Espinosa (Ica)

The 1965 Ligas Distritales were the district-level football leagues in Peru, organised by the respective local league authorities. These competitions had been established in different years, depending on when football was introduced and developed in each district. The district leagues ran concurrently with the Peruvian Primera División and formed part of the broader structure of Peruvian football.

== Historical background ==
Alongside the 1965 Peruvian Primera División, various district football leagues were held across Peru; these were not integrated into a national league system organized by the Peruvian Football Federation. As a result, provincial clubs faced teams from Lima and Callao only in friendly matches, since no official nationwide competition existed to bring them together.

To integrate football at a national level, it was decided that, starting in 1966, the Primera División would adopt a nationwide format under the name Torneo Descentralizado. For this purpose, four provincial teams — representing the leagues considered most competitive and stable — were invited to join the ten clubs that had participated in the 1965 Primera División.

The district champions of Arequipa, Ica, Trujillo, and Piura were invited to take part: Melgar (Arequipa), Octavio Espinosa (Ica), Alfonso Ugarte de Chiclín (Trujillo), and Atlético Grau (Piura).

== Liga Distrital de Arequipa ==
In July 1966, the Liga Provincial de Arequipa was invited by the Peruvian Football Federation to nominate a team to take part, as a guest, in the first edition of the 1966 Torneo Descentralizado.

The tournament began in August of that year. At the time the decision had to be made over which Arequipa club would enter professional football, FBC Aurora and the president of the Provincial League, Félix Montesinos, were on one of their regular international tours in northern Chile. In their absence, Melgar's directors requested that the spot be allocated to their club, citing their status as back-to-back Arequipa champions in 1964 and 1965.

=== Standings ===
| Pos | Team | Pld | W | D | L | GF | GA | GD | Pts | Qualification or relegation |
|---|---|---|---|---|---|---|---|---|---|---|
| 1 | Melgar (C) | 18 | 10 | 5 | 3 | 39 | 21 | +18 | 25 | 1966 Torneo Descentralizado |
| 2 | Piérola | 18 | 9 | 5 | 4 | 38 | 25 | +13 | 23 | |
| 3 | White Star | 18 | 8 | 6 | 4 | 32 | 23 | +9 | 22 | |
| 4 | Independiente Miraflores | 18 | 8 | 4 | 6 | 27 | 25 | +2 | 20 | |
| 5 | Deportivo Isabelino | 18 | 8 | 4 | 6 | 26 | 27 | −1 | 20 | |
| 6 | Independencia | 18 | 7 | 2 | 9 | 28 | 30 | −2 | 16 | |
| 7 | Sportivo Huracán | 18 | 5 | 6 | 7 | 27 | 35 | −8 | 16 | |
| 8 | Aurora | 18 | 5 | 5 | 8 | 24 | 31 | −7 | 15 | |
| 9 | León del Sur | 18 | 4 | 4 | 10 | 22 | 33 | −11 | 12 | |
| 10 | Sport Victoria del Huayco (R) | 18 | 3 | 5 | 10 | 17 | 30 | −13 | 11 | 1966 Segunda División Distrital |

Source: Peru 1965 season
(C) Champions; (R) Relegated

== Liga Distrital de Ica ==
Between 1961 and 1965, Club Octavio Espinosa won five consecutive titles in the Liga Distrital de Ica, one of the most successful runs in the club's history. Following this record, the club was invited by the Peruvian Football Federation to take part in the inaugural Torneo Descentralizado in 1966.

The club made its top-flight debut on 14 August of that year, losing 1–0 to Defensor Arica at the José Picasso Peratta Stadium. Tipiani, Campos, Benítez, Ramírez, Martínez, Anchante, Ormeño, Herrera, Franco, Uribe, and Jhong were the first players to represent the club in the Peruvian Primera División.

== Liga Distrital de Piura ==
In 1966, Club Atlético Grau, under president Orlando Balarezo Calle, was invited by the Peruvian Football Federation to take part in the inaugural edition of the Torneo Descentralizado, along with Melgar, Alfonso Ugarte de Chiclín, and Octavio Espinosa, which had also been invited. The club made its debut in the competition on 14 August 1966, winning 1–0 against Alianza Lima.

In that tournament, Grau retained its place in the top flight, finishing as the highest-placed of the four invited teams. The club remained in the Primera División until 1970, when it was relegated alongside Deportivo SIMA of Callao.

== Liga Distrital de Trujillo ==
At the start of 1966, after winning the Liga Distrital de Trujillo title, the club was invited by the Peruvian Football Federation to take part in the inaugural edition of the Torneo Descentralizado, marking the beginning of the decentralized national championship.

On 13 August of that year, it became the first provincial club to play a match in the Peruvian Primera División, drawing 0–0 with Sporting Cristal. In its first season in professional football, Alfonso Ugarte de Chiclín finished 12th of 14 teams and was subsequently required to compete in the Copa Perú, in accordance with the tournament regulations.

== Post 1966 Torneo Descentralizado ==
At the conclusion of the inaugural Torneo Descentralizado, Octavio Espinosa, Alfonso Ugarte de Chiclín, and FBC Melgar were relegated, having been required to finish seventh or higher to retain their place in the Primera División. Atlético Grau was the only one of the four invited teams to remain in the top flight, finishing sixth with 29 points.

== See also ==
- 1966 Torneo Descentralizado
- 1965 Peruvian Primera División
- 1965 Peruvian Segunda División
- 1965 Cuadrangular de Campeones Provincianos
