= 1970 FBC Melgar season =

FBC Melgar
1970 season
- Stadium: Estadio Mariano Melgar
- Torneo de Selección y Competencia de Arequipa: Torneo de Selección y Competencia: First (1°); First in Arequipa (1°)
Home colours	Away colours	Third colours

The 1970 FBC Melgar season were the Fifty-Sixth (56.º) of the club from its foundation in 1915, One (1) participation in the top-flight of Peruvian Primera División (of 54 Editions) with denomination Torneo Descentralizado. In Previous Season the club qualified as Runner-up 2nd Place of the 1969 Copa Perú National Stage.

Melgar were a of ten (10) clubs in the Nn edition (+1.º) Torneo de Selección y Competencia of Arequipa City, the competition in Copa Perú of the Peruvian football. The club played the Copa Perú for Fourth (4th) Time, in Season 1970 Liga Distrital (of +1° Editions), Liga Provincial (of 4 Editions), Liga Departamental de Arequipa (of 5 Editions), Región Sur (of 4 Editions) and National stage (Copa Perú) (of 4 Editions).

== Squad ==
No.	Pos.	Nation	Player
—	GK	PER	Rolando Farfán
—	GK	PER	José Valderrama
—	DF	PER	Walter Milera
—	DF	PER	Hernán Paredes
—	DF	PER	Francisco Maldonado
—	DF	PER	Helard Delgado
—	DF	PER	Guillermo Fuentes
—	DF	PER	Luis Maraví
—	DF	PER	Jesús Neyra
—	DF	PER	Delfín Delgado
—	MF	PER	Luis Cavagnari
—	MF	PER	Eusebio Leyva
—	MF	PER	César Ticona

No.	Pos.	Nation	Player
—	MF	PER	Armando Palacios
—	MF	PER	Luis Ponce Arroé
—	MF	PER	Alfredo Salinas
—	MF	PER	Carlos Bermejo
—	MF	PER	Juan Carlos Pedraza
—	MF	PER	Enrique Ramírez
—	FW	PER	Ruffo Fernández
—	FW	PER	Raúl Ruiz
—	FW	PER	Emilio Barra
—	FW	PER	Eduardo Márquez
—	FW	PER	Raúl Rossel
—	FW	PER	José Risco
—	FW	PER	Emilio Alfaro

== Copa Perú ==
=== Liga Distrital de Arequipa ===
Torneo de Selección y Competencia

Pos	Team	Pld	W	D	L	GF	GA	GD	Pts
1	FBC Melgar	9	7	2	0	18	2	+16	16
2	Sportivo Huracán	9	4	5	0	11	5	+6	13
3	Club Deportivo Mistiano	9	2	5	2	13	10	+3	9

== See also ==
- FBC Melgar
- 1970 Copa Perú
