= 1966 FBC Melgar season =

FBC Melgar
1966 season
- Stadium: Estadio Mariano Melgar
- Torneo Descentralizado: Torneo Descentralizado League: Eighth (8°); Eighth National (8°)
Home colours	Away colours	Third colours

The 1966 FBC Melgar season were the Seventy-eighth (52.º) of the club from its foundation in 1915, One (1) participation in the top-flight of Peruvian Primera División (of 50 Editions) with denomination Torneo Descentralizado. In Previous Season the club qualified as 1th Place of the Torneo de Selección y Competencia of 1965 Arequipa.

Melgar were a of fourteen (14) clubs in the First edition (1.º) Torneo Descentralizado, the competition most important of the Peruvian football. The club played the Peruvian Primera División for First (1st) Time.

== Torneo Descentralizado ==
=== Torneo Descentralizado League ===
Pos	Team	Pld	W	D	L	GF	GA	GD	Pts
7	Defensor Lima	26	10	8	8	49	36	+13	28
8	FBC Melgar	26	12	4	10	43	30	+13	28
9	Defensor Arica	26	10	8	8	31	26	+5	28

== See also ==
- FBC Melgar
- 1966 Torneo Descentralizado
