= 1970 Copa Presidente de la República =

Copa Presidente de la República
Tournament details
- Country: Peru
- Dates: 17 May – 13 June 1970
- Teams: 16

Final positions
- Champions: Universitario
- Runners-up: Melgar
- Third place: Defensor Lima

Tournament statistics
- Matches played: 32
- Goals scored: 84 (2.63 per match)

The Copa Presidente de la República also called the Mundialito was a Peruvian national cup that was played during the 1970 FIFA World Cup. The 16 clubs were divided into 4 groups and the top two teams advanced to the quarterfinals. The champions were Universitario.

== Teams ==
=== Stadia locations ===
Locations of the 1970 teams

| Team | City |
Primera División
| Alianza Lima | Lima |
| Atlético Grau | Piura |
| Carlos A. Mannucci | Trujillo |
| Defensor Arica | Lima |
| Defensor Lima | Lima |
| Deportivo Municipal | Lima |
| Deportivo SIMA | Callao |
| Juan Aurich | Chiclayo |
| Porvenir Miraflores | Lima |
| Octavio Espinosa | Ica |
| Sport Boys | Callao |
| Sporting Cristal | Lima |
| Universitario | Lima |
Copa Perú
| Deportivo Garcilaso | Cusco |
| Melgar | Arequipa |
| Unión Ocopilla | Huancayo |

The whole tournament was played in five stadiums:

| Stadium | City |
|---|---|
| Estadio Mariano Melgar | Arequipa |
| Estadio Teodoro Lolo Fernández | Lima |
| Estadio Elías Aguirre | Chiclayo |
| Estadio Garcilaso | Cusco |
| Estadio IV Centenario | Huancayo |

== Group stage ==
=== Group A ===
| Pos | Team | Pld | W | D | L | GF | GA | GD | Pts | Qualification or relegation | AUR | GRA | MUN | CAM |
|---|---|---|---|---|---|---|---|---|---|---|---|---|---|---|
| 1 | Juan Aurich | 3 | 2 | 1 | 0 | 5 | 2 | +3 | 5 | Quarterfinals | | 1–0 | | 2–2 |
| 2 | Atlético Grau | 3 | 2 | 0 | 1 | 6 | 3 | +3 | 4 | Quarterfinals | | | | 2–1 |
| 3 | Deportivo Municipal | 3 | 1 | 0 | 2 | 1 | 6 | −5 | 2 | | 0–2 | 1–4 | | |
| 4 | Carlos A. Mannucci | 3 | 0 | 1 | 2 | 3 | 4 | −1 | 1 | | | | W.O. | |

==== Results ====
| 17 May 1970 | Carlos A. Mannucci | W.O. | Deportivo Municipal | Estadio Elías Aguirre, Chiclayo |
| 13:30 | | | | Attendance: 4,368 |

* Carlos A. Mannucci originally won the match 1–0 against Deportivo Municipal. However, following the improper registration of player Moacyr, the club forfeited the match, and the victory was subsequently awarded to Deportivo Municipal.

| 17 May 1970 | Juan Aurich | 1–0 | Atlético Grau | Estadio Elías Aguirre, Chiclayo |
| 15:30 | Juan Orbegoso 47' |

| 20 May 1970 | Deportivo Municipal | 1–4 | Atlético Grau | Estadio Elías Aguirre, Chiclayo |
| 13:30 | Goal | | Enrique Vargas; Raúl Olaechea |

| 20 May 1970 | Juan Aurich | 2–2 | Carlos A. Mannucci | Estadio Elías Aguirre, Chiclayo |
| 15:30 | Juan Orbegoso; Carlos Carbonell (pen.) | | Carlos Carbonell (o.g.); Ángel Guerrero |

| 24 May 1970 | Atlético Grau | 2–1 | Carlos A. Mannucci | Estadio Elías Aguirre, Chiclayo |
| 13:30 | Raúl Olaechea 55'; Enrique Vargas 75' | | Ángel Guerrero 89' |

| 24 May 1970 | Deportivo Municipal | 0–2 | Juan Aurich | Estadio Elías Aguirre, Chiclayo |
| 15:30 | | | Juan Orbegoso 32'; Mario Catalá 40' |

=== Group B ===
| Pos | Team | Pld | W | D | L | GF | GA | GD | Pts | Qualification or relegation | UNI | DEF | OCO | SIM |
|---|---|---|---|---|---|---|---|---|---|---|---|---|---|---|
| 1 | Universitario | 3 | 2 | 1 | 0 | 8 | 4 | +4 | 5 | Quarterfinals | | 4–1 | | 3–2 |
| 2 | Defensor Lima | 3 | 2 | 0 | 1 | 5 | 4 | +1 | 4 | Quarterfinals | | | | 2–0 |
| 3 | Unión Ocopilla | 3 | 1 | 1 | 1 | 3 | 3 | 0 | 3 | | 1–1 | 0–2 | | |
| 4 | Deportivo SIMA | 3 | 0 | 0 | 3 | 2 | 7 | −5 | 0 | | | | 0–2 | |

==== Results ====
| 17 May 1970 | Universitario | 3–2 | Deportivo SIMA | Estadio IV Centenario, Huancayo |
| 13:30 | Juan José Muñante 42'; Ángel Uribe 57'; Percy Rojas 62' | | Moisés Chumpitaz 72'; Quitef 82' |

| 17 May 1970 | Unión Ocopilla | 0–2 | Defensor Lima | Estadio IV Centenario, Huancayo |
| 15:30 | | | Pedro Cajo 48'; Francisco Gonzáles 60' |

| 20 May 1970 | Deportivo SIMA | 0–2 | Unión Ocopilla | Estadio IV Centenario, Huancayo |
| 13:30 | | | Guillermo Vargas; Carlos Saravia |

| 20 May 1970 | Universitario | 4–1 | Defensor Lima | Estadio IV Centenario, Huancayo |
| 15:30 | Juan José Muñante 15'; Víctor Calatayud 51'; Ángel Uribe 87' 89' | | Pedro Cajo 4' |

| 24 May 1970 | Defensor Lima | 2–0 | Deportivo SIMA | Estadio IV Centenario, Huancayo |
| 13:30 | Juan José Ávalos 10'; Francisco Gonzáles 18' |

| 24 May 1970 | Unión Ocopilla | 1–1 | Universitario | Estadio IV Centenario, Huancayo |
| 15:30 | Carlos Saravia 18' | | Carlos Daniel Jurado 44' |

=== Group C ===
| Pos | Team | Pld | W | D | L | GF | GA | GD | Pts | Qualification or relegation | GAR | OCT | ARI | SBA |
|---|---|---|---|---|---|---|---|---|---|---|---|---|---|---|
| 1 | Deportivo Garcilaso | 3 | 1 | 2 | 0 | 5 | 3 | +2 | 4 | Quarterfinals | | | | 3–1 |
| 2 | Octavio Espinosa | 3 | 1 | 2 | 0 | 6 | 4 | +2 | 4 | Quarterfinals | 2–2 | | 1–1 | |
| 3 | Defensor Arica | 3 | 1 | 2 | 0 | 3 | 2 | +1 | 4 | | 0–0 | | | 2–1 |
| 4 | Sport Boys | 3 | 0 | 0 | 3 | 3 | 8 | −5 | 0 | | | 1–3 | | |

==== Results ====
| 17 May 1970 | Octavio Espinosa | 1–1 | Defensor Arica | Estadio Garcilaso, Cusco |
| 13:30 | Ricardo Ormeño 78' | | Ángel Avilés 8' |

| 17 May 1970 | Deportivo Garcilaso | 3–1 | Sport Boys | Estadio Garcilaso, Cusco |
| 15:30 | Raúl Huambo 60'; Humberto Castañeda 80'; Cornejo 89' | | Carlos Antonio Solís 1' | Referee: 5,877 |

| 20 May 1970 | Defensor Arica | 2–1 | Sport Boys | Estadio Garcilaso, Cusco |
| 13:30 | Henry Perales 61'; José Sierra 80' | | Carlos Antonio Solís 63' |

| 20 May 1970 | Octavio Espinosa | 2–2 | Deportivo Garcilaso | Estadio Garcilaso, Cusco |
| 15:30 | David Arévalo 51'; Juan García 68' | | Raúl Huambo 44'; Gonzáles 77' |

| 24 May 1970 | Sport Boys | 1–3 | Octavio Espinosa | Estadio Garcilaso, Cusco |
| 13:30 | Carlos Antonio Solís | | David Arévalo 44'; Richard Green 67'; Juan García | Referee: Miranda |

| 24 May 1970 | Defensor Arica | 0–0 | Deportivo Garcilaso | Estadio Garcilaso, Cusco |
| 15:30 |

=== Group D ===
| Pos | Team | Pld | W | D | L | GF | GA | GD | Pts | Qualification or relegation | MEL | POR | CRI | ALI |
|---|---|---|---|---|---|---|---|---|---|---|---|---|---|---|
| 1 | Melgar | 3 | 1 | 1 | 1 | 2 | 1 | +1 | 3 | Quarterfinals | | | 0–0 | |
| 2 | Porvenir Miraflores | 3 | 1 | 1 | 1 | 5 | 5 | 0 | 3 | Quarterfinals | 0–2 | | | 2–0 |
| 3 | Sporting Cristal | 3 | 0 | 3 | 0 | 4 | 4 | 0 | 3 | | | 3–3 | | |
| 4 | Alianza Lima | 3 | 1 | 1 | 1 | 2 | 3 | −1 | 3 | | 1–0 | | 1–1 | |

==== Results ====
| 17 May 1970 | Porvenir Miraflores | 2–0 | Alianza Lima | Estadio Mariano Melgar, Arequipa |
| 13:30 | Jorge Quipusco 7'; Alejandro Campos 15' | | | Attendance: 8,500; Referee: V. Acuña |

| 17 May 1970 | Melgar | 0–0 | Sporting Cristal | Estadio Mariano Melgar, Arequipa |
| 15:30 | | | | Referee: F. Ortega |

| 20 May 1970 | Alianza Lima | 1–1 | Sporting Cristal | Estadio Mariano Melgar, Arequipa |
| 13:30 | Víctor Zegarra 64' | | Tadeo Risco 34' |

| 20 May 1970 | Porvenir Miraflores | 0–2 | Melgar | Estadio Mariano Melgar, Arequipa |
| 15:30 | | | Rafael Quispe 31' (o.g.); Juan Carlos Pedraza 84' |

| 24 May 1970 | Sporting Cristal | 3–3 | Porvenir Miraflores | Estadio Mariano Melgar, Arequipa |
| 13:30 | Carlos Gonzales Pajuelo 4'; José Navarro 17' 46' | | Miguel García 12'; Héctor Bailetti 52'; César Di Negro 60' |

| 24 May 1970 | Alianza Lima | 1–0 | Melgar | Estadio Mariano Melgar, Arequipa |
| 15:30 | Félix Rubianes |

== Final Rounds ==
=== Bracket ===
Quarterfinals
Universitario | 2
Atlético Grau | 0
Porvenir Miraflores | 2
Deportivo Garcilaso | 2
Melgar | 3
Octavio Espinosa | 0
Defensor Lima | 1
Juan Aurich | 0

Semifinals
Universitario | 2
Porvenir Miraflores | 0
Melgar | 1
Defensor Lima | 0

Finals
Universitario | 4
Melgar | 0

=== Quarterfinals ===
| 30 May 1970 | Universitario | 2–0 | Atlético Grau | Estadio Teodoro Lolo Fernández, Lima |
| 15:30 | Luis La Fuente 5'; Percy Rojas |

| 30 May 1970 | Juan Aurich | 0–1 | Defensor Lima | Estadio Elías Aguirre, Chiclayo |
| 15:30 | | | Vidal 68' (o.g.) |

| 30 May 1970 | Deportivo Garcilaso | 2–2 (1–4 p) | Porvenir Miraflores | Estadio Garcilaso de la Vega, Cusco |
| 15:30 | Saavedra 102' | | Héctor Bailetti 103' |

| 30 May 1970 | Melgar | 3–0 | Octavio Espinosa | Estadio Mariano Melgar, Arequipa |
| 15:30 | Juan Carlos Pedraza 11' 38' 42' | | | Attendance: 5,000 |

=== Semifinals ===
| 6 June 1970 | Universitario | 2–0 | Porvenir Miraflores | Estadio Teodoro Lolo Fernández, Lima |
| 14:00 |

| 7 June 1970 | Melgar | 1–0 | Defensor Lima | Estadio Teodoro Lolo Fernández, Lima |
| 15:30 | Raúl Rossell 87' |

=== Third place play-off ===
| 13 June 1970 | Porvenir Miraflores | 2–2 (2–3 p) | Defensor Lima | Estadio Teodoro Lolo Fernández, Lima |
| 13:30 |

=== Final ===
13 June 1970

| Universitario | 4–0 | Melgar |
|---|---|---|
| Carlos Daniel Jurado 4'; Percy Rojas 21'; Juan José Muñante 32'; Julio Luna 63' (pen.) |

Estadio Teodoro Lolo Fernández, Lima

== See also ==
- 1970 Torneo Descentralizado
- 1970 Peruvian Segunda División
- 1970 Copa Perú
