= 1967 Sporting Cristal season =

Sporting Cristal
1967 season
- Stadium: San Martín de Porres, Lima
- Torneo Descentralizado: Torneo Descentralizado League: Runners-up (2°); Runners National (2°)
Home colours	Away colours	Third colours

The 1967 Sporting Cristal season were the Twelfth (12.º) of the club from its foundation in 1955, Twelve (12) participations consecutives in the top-flight of Peruvian Primera División (of 51 Editions) with denomination Torneo Descentralizado. In Previous Season the club qualified as 4th Place of the 1966 Torneo Descentralizado.

Sporting Cristal were a of fourteen (14) clubs in the Second edition (2.º) Torneo Descentralizado, the competition most important of the Peruvian football. The club played the Peruvian Primera División.

== Torneo Descentralizado ==
=== Torneo Descentralizado League ===
Pos	Team	Pld	W	D	L	GF	GA	GD	Pts
1	Universitario	26	20	1	5	64	19	+45	41
2	Sporting Cristal	26	13	10	3	43	20	+23	36
3	Alianza Lima	26	14	7	5	42	23	+19	35

== See also ==
- Club Sporting Cristal
- 1967 Torneo Descentralizado
