= Francisco Maldonado (footballer) =

Peruvian footballer (born 1943)

Personal information
- Full name: Francisco Maldonado Chávez
- Date of birth: 10 February 1943 (age 83)
- Place of birth: Moquegua, Department of Moquegua, Peru
- Position: Central defender

Youth career
- –1963: Atlético Huracán de Moquegua

Senior career*
Years	Team	Apps	(Gls)
1964–1965	Augusto B. Leguía		
1966–1967	Atlético Huracán de Moquegua		
1968	Independiente Miraflores		
1969–1972	Melgar		
1973	Sportivo Huracán		
1976	Deportivo La Breña		
- * Club domestic league appearances and goals

Francisco Maldonado Chávez (born 10 February 1943) is a retired Peruvian footballer. Nicknamed "Chuchampas", he played for Melgar and Sportivo Huracán throughout the early 1970s as a central defender.

== Club career ==
Maldonado began his youth career within his home city of Moquegua for Atlético Huracán de Moquegua. Despite this, when he made his senior debut in 1964, he played for Tacna-based club Augusto B. Leguía where, despite being considered one of the best players in the club, would suffer an injury in the tibia and the fibula. Even with these injuries however, he then returned to Atlético Huracán for the 1966 and 1967 Copa Perú alongside fellow Moqueguan footballer Fernando Cuéllar Ávalos and formed the defensive formation alongside brothers Ferrer and Guillermo Rospigliosi. In 1968, he began playing for the Liga de Arequipa for Independiente Miraflores and after noticing his talents, was signed by Melgar to win the following 1969 championship. Throughout the early 1970s, he would help the club achieve promotion for the 1971 Torneo Descentralizado following their victory at the 1971 Copa Perú. He then played for Sportivo Huracán where he once again contributed the club's victory at the 1973 Copa Perú for their subsequent promotion and single season in the top-flight of Peruvian football. He retired in 1976 following persistent injuries in his knee for Deportivo La Breña.

== Personal life ==
Following his retirement, he worked as an administrator for Peruvian health insurance company Seguro Social de Salud del Perú where he served as an regional inspector in Moquegua for more than 30 years.

Maldonado was also a basketball player and a swimmer, representing his home department of Moquegua throughout various tournaments.
