= 1968 FBC Melgar season =

FBC Melgar
1968 season
- Stadium: Estadio Mariano Melgar
- Torneo de Selección y Competencia de Arequipa: Torneo de Selección y Competencia: First (1°); First in Arequipa (1°)
Home colours	Away colours	Third colours

The 1968 FBC Melgar season were the Fifty-Fourth (54.º) of the club from its foundation in 1915, One (1) participation in the top-flight of Peruvian Primera División (of 52 Editions) with denomination Torneo Descentralizado. In Previous Season the club qualified as 4th Place of the 1967 Copa Perú National Stage.

Melgar were a of ten (10) clubs in the Nn edition (+1.º) Torneo de Selección y Competencia of Arequipa City, the competition in Copa Perú of the Peruvian football. The club played the Copa Perú for Second (2nd) Time, in Season 1968 Liga Distrital (of +1° Editions), Liga Provincial (of 2 Editions), Liga Departamental de Arequipa (of 3 Editions), Región Sur (of 2 Editions) and National stage (Copa Perú) (of 2 Editions).

== Copa Perú ==
=== Liga Distrital de Arequipa ===
Torneo de Selección y Competencia

Pos	Team	Pld	W	D	L	GF	GA	GD	Pts
1	FBC Melgar	18	13	4	1	56	17	+39	30
2	Club Independiente Miraflores	18	13	2	3	27	12	+15	28
3	Sportivo Huracán	18	8	7	3	29	13	+16	23

== See also ==
- FBC Melgar
- 1968 Copa Perú
