= Francisco Maldonado =

Francisco Maldonado may refer to:

- Francisco Maldonado (rebel) (1480-1521), Spanish leader of the rebel Comuneros
- Francisco Maldonado (monk) (1571-1650), Guatemalan Franciscan linguist and historian
- Francisco Maldonado da Silva (1592-1639), Peruvian marrano physician
- Francisco Severo Maldonado (1775-1832), philosopher, Catholic priest, professor and writer from New Spain
- Francisco Maldonado (footballer) (born 1943), Peruvian football defender
- Francisco José Maldonado (born 1981), Spanish football forward
