= 1967 Torneo Descentralizado =

Torneo Descentralizado
- Season: 1967
- Dates: 17 June 1967 – 23 December 1967
- Champions: Universitario; 12th Primera División title
- Runner up: Sporting Cristal
- Relegated: Alfonso Ugarte de Chiclín; Deportivo Municipal
- 1968 Copa Libertadores: Universitario; Sporting Cristal
- Matches: 182
- Goals: 471 (2.59 per match)
- Top goalscorer: Pedro Pablo Leon (14 goals)

The 1967 Torneo Descentralizado was the 51st season of the highest division of Peruvian football. Although Alfonso Ugarte de Chiclín and Octavio Espinosa were relegated last season, they regained promotion to the first division through the 1967 Copa Perú which was played prior to the start of the first division. Juan Aurich of Chiclayo made its debut in the first division in this season.

The defending champion Universitario retained their title. Deportivo Municipal and Alfonso Ugarte de Chiclín were relegated.

== Teams ==
=== Team changes ===
Promoted from 1966 Segunda División	Promoted from 1967 Copa Perú	Relegated from 1966 Primera División
▲ Porvenir Miraflores (1st)	▲ Alfonso Ugarte de Chiclín (1st) ▲ Octavio Espinosa (2nd) ▲ Juan Aurich (3rd)	▼ Melgar (8th) ▼ Alfonso Ugarte de Chiclín (12th) ▼ Octavio Espinosa (13th) ▼ Carlos Concha (14th)

=== Stadia locations ===
Locations of the 1967 Primera División teams

Team	City
Alfonso Ugarte de Chiclín	Trujillo
Alianza Lima	La Victoria, Lima
Atlético Grau	Piura
Centro Iqueño	Cercado de Lima
Defensor Arica	Breña, Lima
Defensor Lima	Breña, Lima
Deportivo Municipal	Cercado de Lima
Juan Aurich	Chiclayo
Mariscal Sucre	La Victoria, Lima
Octavio Espinosa	Ica
Porvenir Miraflores	Miraflores, Lima
Sport Boys	Callao
Sporting Cristal	Rímac, Lima
Universitario	Breña, Lima

The whole tournament was played in seven stadiums:

Stadium	City
Estadio Nacional	Lima
Estadio Teodoro Lolo Fernández	Lima
Estadio Elías Aguirre	Chiclayo
Estadio Miguel Grau	Piura
Estadio Modelo de Trujillo	Trujillo
Estadio Municipal de Ica	Ica
Estadio Municipal de Pisco	Pisco

== League table ==
=== Standings ===
Pos	Team	Pld	W	D	L	GF	GA	GD	Pts	Qualification or relegation
1	Universitario (C)	26	20	1	5	64	19	+45	41	1968 Copa Libertadores
2	Sporting Cristal	26	13	10	3	43	20	+23	36	1968 Copa Libertadores
3	Alianza Lima	26	14	7	5	42	23	+19	35	
4	Defensor Lima	26	14	5	7	41	27	+14	33	
5	Defensor Arica	26	13	7	6	37	23	+14	33	
6	Atlético Grau	26	11	7	8	33	40	−7	29	
7	Sport Boys	26	9	6	11	33	31	+2	24	
8	Porvenir Miraflores	26	8	7	11	24	28	−4	23	
9	Juan Aurich	26	9	5	12	27	37	−10	23	
10	Centro Iqueño	26	5	11	10	28	41	−13	21	
11	Octavio Espinosa	26	6	8	12	25	39	−14	20	
12	Mariscal Sucre	26	5	9	12	22	40	−18	19	
13	Deportivo Municipal (R)	26	2	11	13	26	62	−36	15	1968 Segunda División
14	Alfonso Ugarte de Chiclín (R)	26	3	6	17	25	40	−15	12	1968 Copa Perú

(C) Champions; (R) Relegated

== Results ==
Home \ Away	UGA	ALI	GRA	IQU	DAR	DLI	MUN	AUR	MSU	OCT	POR	SBA	CRI	UNI
Alfonso Ugarte de Chiclín		2–0	2–3	0–0	0–1	0–1	7–2	1–2	1–2	2–3	0–0	0–0	0–1	2–4
Alianza Lima	1–0		3–1	4–1	1–0	1–1	1–1	4–1	0–0	1–0	0–0	2–0	5–1	3–1
Atlético Grau	1–0	1–0		1–0	1–1	1–1	3–0	1–2	1–0	0–0	2–1	2–1	0–0	1–0
Centro Iqueño	0–2	0–0	4–2		1–2	2–0	2–2	0–0	1–0	1–1	0–0	1–2	1–1	0–4
Defensor Arica	3–0	1–2	3–3	0–0		1–0	0–0	4–1	1–0	2–0	1–1	0–0	0–5	1–0
Defensor Lima	2–0	1–1	3–0	3–0	0–1		4–3	3–1	2–1	2–2	2–0	3–2	2–2	0–3
Deportivo Municipal	1–1	1–5	2–2	4–4	1–4	1–3		2–2	0–0	1–0	1–3	0–5	1–1	0–5
Juan Aurich	3–0	0–1	1–0	0–3	2–1	1–0	1–1		1–0	1–0	3–0	0–0	0–1	0–2
Mariscal Sucre	2–2	1–0	1–1	2–2	1–0	0–3	0–0	1–2		1–2	2–0	1–1	2–5	1–7
Octavio Espinosa	1–0	1–1	4–3	0–0	2–2	0–2	1–2	1–0	1–1		3–2	1–2	0–1	0–3
Porvenir Miraflores	3–1	0–2	0–1	5–2	0–1	1–0	1–0	2–0	0–1	2–1		1–1	0–0	2–1
Sport Boys	1–0	1–2	2–0	1–2	1–4	0–1	2–0	3–0	2–1	3–1	0–0		1–2	1–2
Sporting Cristal	1–1	4–0	7–2	2–1	1–0	0–1	2–0	1–1	1–1	0–0	1–0	3–0		0–1
Universitario	2–1	3–2	2–0	2–0	0–3	2–0	3–0	5–1	4–0	4–0	2–0	2–1	0–0	

Updated to match(es) played on 1967. Source: Diario El Comercio, La Prensa and Crónica.
Legend: Blue = home team win; Yellow = draw; Red = away team win.

== Top scorers ==
Player	Nationality	Goals	Club
Pedro Pablo León	Peru	15	Alianza Lima

== See also ==
- 1967 Peruvian Segunda División
- 1967 Copa Perú
