= 1966 Sporting Cristal season =

Sporting Cristal
1966 season
- Stadium: San Martín de Porres, Lima
- Torneo Descentralizado: Torneo Descentralizado League: Fourth (4°); Fourth National (4°)
Home colours	Away colours	Third colours

The 1966 Sporting Cristal season were the Eleventh (11.º) of the club from its foundation in 1955, Eleven (11) participations consecutives in the top-flight of Peruvian Primera División (of 50 Editions) with denomination Torneo Descentralizado. In Previous Season the club qualified as 6th Place of the 1965 Peruvian Primera División.

Sporting Cristal were a of fourteen (14) clubs in the First edition (1.º) Torneo Descentralizado, the competition most important of the Peruvian football. The club played the Peruvian Primera División.

== Torneo Descentralizado ==
=== Torneo Descentralizado League ===
Pos	Team	Pld	W	D	L	GF	GA	GD	Pts
3	Alianza Lima	26	14	5	7	58	34	+24	33
4	Sporting Cristal	26	12	6	8	36	24	+12	30
5	Centro Iqueño	26	13	4	9	31	27	+4	30

== See also ==
- Club Sporting Cristal
- 1966 Torneo Descentralizado
