= 1969 FBC Melgar season =

FBC Melgar
1969 season
- Stadium: Estadio Mariano Melgar
- Torneo de Selección y Competencia de Arequipa: Torneo de Selección y Competencia: First (1°); First in Arequipa (1°)
Home colours	Away colours	Third colours

The 1969 FBC Melgar season were the Fifty-Fifth (55.º) of the club from its foundation in 1915, One (1) participation in the top-flight of Peruvian Primera División (of 53 Editions) with denomination Torneo Descentralizado. In Previous Season the club qualified as 5th Place of the 1968 Copa Perú National Stage.

Melgar were a of ten (10) clubs in the Nn edition (+1.º) Torneo de Selección y Competencia of Arequipa City, the competition in Copa Perú of the Peruvian football. The club played the Copa Perú for Third (3rd) Time, in Season 1969 Liga Distrital (of +1° Editions), Liga Provincial (of 3 Editions), Liga Departamental de Arequipa (of 4 Editions), Región Sur (of 3 Editions) and National stage (Copa Perú) (of 3 Editions).

== Copa Perú ==
=== Liga Distrital de Arequipa ===
Torneo de Selección y Competencia

Pos	Team	Pld	W	D	L	GF	GA	GD	Pts
1	FBC Melgar	12	4	2	1	56	7	+49	28
2	Atlético Universidad	18	10	6	2	41	21	+20	26
3	Sportivo Huracán	18	8	6	4	34	28	+6	22

== See also ==
- FBC Melgar
- 1969 Copa Perú
