= 1971 Club Sporting Cristal season =

Sporting Cristal
1971 season
- Stadium: San Martín de Porres, Lima
- Torneo Descentralizado: Torneo Descentralizado League: Fourth (4°); Fourth National (4°)
Home colours	Away colours	Third colours

The 1971 Sporting Cristal season was the 16th of the club from its foundation in 1955, Sixteen consecutive participations in the top-flight of Peruvian Primera División (of 55 Editions) with denomination Torneo Descentralizado. In the Previous Season the club qualified as coming in National Champions 1st Place in the 1970 Torneo Descentralizado.

Sporting Cristal were one of fourteen clubs in the Sixth edition of Torneo Descentralizado, the top tier competition of the Peruvian football. The club played in the Peruvian Primera División and Copa Libertadores for 4th time.

== Torneo Descentralizado ==
=== Torneo Descentralizado League ===
Pos	Team	Pld	W	D	L	GF	GA	GD	Pts
3	Defensor Lima	30	14	11	5	48	30	+18	39
4	Sporting Cristal	30	13	12	5	50	36	+14	38
5	Deportivo Municipal	30	14	9	7	47	34	+13	37

== See also ==
- Club Sporting Cristal
- 1971 Torneo Descentralizado
