= María Santos Corrales =

Muse of Mariano Melgar

María Santos Corrales (November 1, 1797 – March 7, 1881) was the inspiration of Peru's famous poet and patriot soldier, Mariano Melgar; she is forever immortalized as "Silvia" in his poetry.

== Biography ==
María Santos Corrales was born on November 1, 1797 (All Saints' Day) in Arequipa, Peru. She was the daughter of José Corrales y Sanabría and Manuela Salazar y Tejada. María Santos and Mariano Melgar knew each other due to their kinship – their fathers were first cousins. Their bonds of kinship were reinforced on February 8, 1812, with the marriage of María Santos's brother (Romualdo) and Mariano's sister (María Josefa). Only 14 years old at the time, María Santos rejected any romantic advances by Mariano Melgar (who was 21). Disillusioned, Mariano left Arequipa and eventually joined the pro-revolutionary forces. He fought at the Battle of Umachiri, where he was captured by royalist forces and executed on March 12, 1815.

On November 24, 1819, María Santos Corrales married a veteran of the Battle of Umachiri and soldier in arms of Mariano Melgar – Dr. and Col. Manuel Amat y León. They had nine children. María Santos Corrales died on March 7, 1881, in Arequipa, Peru at the age of 83. Her tombstone can be found at La Apacheta cemetery, in Arequipa, Peru.

== Sources ==
"Coronel y Dr. Dn. Manuel Amat y León, Biografía Histórica," Artemio Peraltilla Diaz, Arequipa, 17 de Mayo de 1969, Imprenta Editorial “El Sol” – Sucre 306
