= 1965 Cuadrangular de Campeones Provincianos =

Cuadrangular de Campeones Provincianos
- Founded: 1965
- Folded: 1965; 61 years ago
- Region: Peru
- Most championships: Octavio Espinosa (1 title)

The Cuadrangular de Campeones Provincianos, was an exhibition football competition hosted in Lima, Peru in 1965. It was a friendly Peruvian football cup created and then organized by the by Orlando Balarezo, president of the Atlético Grau.

With football activity practically paralyzed among the Lima teams because the Peru national football team was playing in the 1966 FIFA World Cup qualification, four provincial teams agreed under the auspices of Orlando Balarezo, president of Atlético Grau, to organize a football tournament in Lima between the provincial champions.

The whole tournament was played in:

Stadium	City
Estadio San Martín de Porres	Rímac, Lima

== Teams ==
Team	City
Atlético Grau	Piura
Juan Aurich	Chiclayo
Lolo Fernández	Cañete
Octavio Espinosa	Ica

== League table ==
=== Standings ===
Pos	Team	Pld	W	D	L	GF	GA	GD	Pts	Qualification or relegation	OCT	LOL	AUR	GRA
1	Octavio Espinosa	3	2	1	0	7	3	+4	5	Champion		1–1	4–1	
2	Lolo Fernández	3	1	2	0	4	3	+1	4				2–1	1–1
3	Juan Aurich	3	1	0	2	4	7	−3	2					2–1
4	Atlético Grau	3	0	1	2	3	5	−2	1		1–2			

Legend: Blue = home team win; Yellow = draw; Red = away team win.
Rules for classification: 1) Points; 2) Goal difference; 3) Goals for; 4) Fair play points; 5) Drawing of lots.

== Results ==
=== Round 1 ===
23 May 1965	Octavio Espinosa	4–1	Juan Aurich	Estadio San Martín de Porres

23 May 1965	Lolo Fernández	1–1	Atlético Grau	Estadio San Martín de Porres

=== Round 2 ===
29 May 1965	Juan Aurich	2–1	Atlético Grau	Estadio San Martín de Porres

29 May 1965	Octavio Espinosa	1–1	Lolo Fernández	Estadio San Martín de Porres

=== Round 3 ===
30 May 1965	Atlético Grau	1–2	Octavio Espinosa	Estadio San Martín de Porres

30 May 1965	Lolo Fernández	2–1	Juan Aurich	Estadio San Martín de Porres
