= Francisco Maldonado (monk) =

Fray Francisco Maldonado (1571 – c. 1640) was a Guatemalan Franciscan linguist and historian. Little is known of him, but he was a prolific writer and joined the Franciscan order in 1605. His ranch seems to have been a notable gathering place for scholars of the times in Mayan linguistics which people would stop off at. The Ramillete manual para los indios sobre la doctrina cristiana is a copy of an original manuscript written by Maldonado, containing important information about the customs of the Quiché peoples at the time of the Spanish invasion. In 1616, Maldonado dedicated his Cakchiquel Explicado Fidei to priest and lexicographer Padre Varea, and also authored Santoral in 1622.
