= Unión Ocopilla =

Peruvian football club

- Full name: Club Unión Ocopilla
- Ground: Estadio Huancayo, Huancayo
- League: Copa Perú
Home colours

Unión Ocopilla is a Peruvian football club, playing in the city of Huancayo, Junín, Peru.

== History ==
In the 1969 Copa Perú, the club qualified to the Final Stage, with San Lorenzo de Almagro of Chiclayo, Carlos A. Mannucci of Trujillo, Salesianos of the Puno, FBC Melgar of Arequipa and Colegio Nacional de Iquitos. In the final stage, the club was fifth place.

In the 1970 Copa Perú, the club qualified to the Final Stage, with Atlético Torino of Talara, Defensor Casagrande of Trujillo, Deportivo Garcilaso of the Cusco, FBC Melgar of Arequipa and Colegio Nacional de Iquitos. In the final stage, the club was fourth place.

== Honours ==
=== National ===
- Liga Departamental de Junín: 2

1969, 1970

== See also ==
- List of football clubs in Peru
- Peruvian football league system
