= Eduardo Márquez (footballer) =

Peruvian footballer (1944–2020)

Personal information
- Full name: Eduardo Márquez Obando
- Date of birth: 27 March 1944
- Place of birth: Arequipa, Peru
- Date of death: 3 August 2020 (aged 76)
- Place of death: Arequipa, Peru
- Position: Forward

Youth career
- ?–1962: Estrella Mistiana de Manzanitos

Senior career*
Years	Team	Apps	(Gls)
1962–1974	FBC Melgar	240	(197)
- * Club domestic league appearances and goals

Eduardo Márquez Obando (27 March 1944 – 3 August 2020) was a Peruvian footballer who played forward.

== Biography ==
Nicknamed Patato, Obando was a star for FBC Melgar in his hometown on Arequipa after his youth career with Estrella Mistiana de Manzanitos. He played for the organization from 1962 to 1974, with the club spending five years in the Peruvian Primera División. He scored 197 goals in 240 games with FBC Melgar, making him the second-highest scorer in the club's history (behind Bernardo Cuesta). They won the Copa Perú in 1971.

Eduardo Márquez Obando died on 3 August 2020 in Arequipa at the age of 76.
