= 1967 Copa Perú =

Copa Perú
- Season: 1967
- Dates: July 1966 – 28 May 1967
- Champions: Alfonso Ugarte de Chiclín
- Runner up: Octavio Espinosa
- Matches: 15
- Goals: 48 (3.2 per match)
- Top goalscorer: Daniel Ruiz (6)
- Highest scoring: Melgar 8–0 CNI; Only national stage taken into consideration

The 1967 Copa Perú season (Spanish: Copa Perú 1967) was the promotion tournament of Peruvian football.

In this tournament after many qualification rounds, each one of the 24 political departments of Peru qualifies a team. Those teams, plus the team relegated from the First Division at the end of the previous season, play in two more rounds. Finally six of the clubs qualify for the Final round, staged in Lima (the capital).

Alfonso Ugarte de Chiclín was crowned champion after defeating CNI of Iquitos 3–2 in the final matchday of the Final Hexagonal.

As a result of the Peru Cup, four teams were promoted to play in 1967 Torneo Descentralizado, which had been expanded from 10 to 14 teams/clubs.

== Teams ==
=== Team changes ===
Relegated from
1966 Primera División
▼ Melgar (8th)
▼ Alfonso Ugarte de Chiclín (12th)
▼ Octavio Espinosa (13th)

== Departmental Stage ==
- The departmental leagues were held between February and March 1967; however, due to scheduling constraints, this edition was considered part of the 1966 season, as the district and provincial leagues had begun between July and August 1966 and concluded in December of that year.

=== Liga Departamental de Áncash ===
==== Standings ====
Pos	Team	Pld	W	D	L	GF	GA	GD	Pts	Qualification	AME	ONC	CUC
1	América de Samanco	3	3	0	0	12	4	+8	6	Regional Stage		2–1	4–2
2	Once Amigos (Huarmey)	3	1	0	2	9	6	+3	2		n.p.		6–1
3	Centro Unión Carhuaz	4	1	0	3	7	18	−11	2		1–6	3–2	

Source: Diario La Crónica 1967
Legend: Blue = home team win; Yellow = draw; Red = away team win.

=== Liga Departamental de Arequipa ===
==== Standings ====
Pos	Team	Pld	W	D	L	GF	GA	GD	Pts	Qualification	HUR	MAR	BUE
1	Sportivo Huracán	4	4	0	0	7	1	+6	8	Regional Stage		2–0	1–0
2	Marítimo Sport (Mollendo)	4	2	0	2	8	5	+3	4		1–3		3–0
3	Buenos Aires (Camaná)	4	0	0	4	0	9	−9	0		0–1	0–4	

Source: Diario La Crónica 1967
Legend: Blue = home team win; Yellow = draw; Red = away team win.

=== Liga Departamental de Ayacucho ===
- The Liga Departamental de Ayacucho proclaimed Deportivo Inti of Ayacucho as champion, awarding it qualification to the Regional Stage following the failure of the champions from Cora Cora and Huanta to appear.

=== Liga Departamental del Cusco ===
==== Standings ====
Pos	Team	Pld	W	D	L	GF	GA	GD	Pts	Qualification	CIE	MAN	AGR	TUP
1	Cienciano	4	4	0	0	14	2	+12	8	Regional Stage		5–1	3–0	
2	Manco II (La Convención)	4	1	0	3	7	11	−4	2		0–3		2–3	
3	Agropecuario (Calca)	4	1	0	3	4	12	−8	2		1–3	0–4		
4	Túpac Amaru (Sicuani)	0	0	0	0	0	0	0	0	Retired				

Source: Diario La Crónica 1967
Legend: Blue = home team win; Yellow = draw; Red = away team win.

=== Liga Departamental de Huánuco ===
==== Title Play-off ====
Team 1	Agg.	Team 2	1st leg	2nd leg
León de Huánuco	3–3	Unidad Sanitaria (Tingo María)	3–0	0–3

===== Tiebreaker =====
Team 1	Score	Team 2
León de Huánuco	8–0	Unidad Sanitaria (Tingo María)

=== Liga Departamental de Ica ===
==== Standings ====
Pos	Team	Pld	W	D	L	GF	GA	GD	Pts	Qualification	HUR	VIC	CHA	COO	RPA	SJO
1	Deportivo Huracán	5	4	1	0	12	2	+10	9	Regional Stage		0–0		3–1	3–0	
2	Víctor Bielich (Pisco)	5	3	2	0	13	1	+12	8				1–1	3–0		6–0
3	Jorge Chávez (Nasca)	5	2	1	2	4	8	−4	5		1–5				1–0	1–0
4	Cooperativa Social (Marcona)	5	1	1	3	4	8	−4	3				2–0			1–2
5	Ricardo Palma (Chincha Alta)	5	1	1	3	2	7	−5	3			0–3		0–0		
6	Buenaventura San José (Chincha)	5	1	0	4	2	11	−9	2		0–1				0–2	

Source: Diario La Crónica 1967
Legend: Blue = home team win; Yellow = draw; Red = away team win.

=== Liga Departamental de Lambayeque ===
==== Standings ====
Pos	Team	Pld	W	D	L	GF	GA	GD	Pts	Qualification	AUR	UNI	CRU	DIA
1	Juan Aurich	6	5	1	0	21	4	+17	11	Regional Stage		3–0	2–2	3–1
2	Universitario (Lambayeque)	6	3	1	2	11	9	+2	7		0–2		3–2	5–0
3	Cruz de Chalpón (Motupe)	6	1	1	4	11	18	−7	3		1–6	1–2		3–2
4	Diablos Rojos (Ferreñafe)	6	1	1	4	7	19	−12	3		0–5	1–1	3–2	

Source: Diario La Crónica 1967
Legend: Blue = home team win; Yellow = draw; Red = away team win.

=== Liga Departamental de Loreto ===
==== Standings ====
Pos	Team	Pld	W	D	L	GF	GA	GD	Pts	Qualification	CNI	CAS	CIN
1	CNI	2	2	0	0	9	4	+5	4	Regional Stage		4–2	
2	Mariscal Castilla (Pucallpa)	1	0	0	1	2	4	−2	0		n.p.		
3	Cinco Esquinas (Yurimaguas)	1	0	0	1	2	5	−3	0		2–5	n.p.	

Source: Diario La Crónica 1967
Legend: Blue = home team win; Yellow = draw; Red = away team win.

=== Liga Departamental de Pasco ===
==== Tiebreaker ====
Team 1	Score	Team 2
Carlos Valdivieso	2–1	UNDAC

=== Liga Departamental de Piura ===
==== Standings ====
Pos	Team	Pld	W	D	L	GF	GA	GD	Pts	Qualification	AAS	JUA	JUV	MON	HAL	CRI	EST	TAR
1	Alianza Atlético	7	5	2	0	20	6	+14	12	Regional Stage		2–1		1–1	3–1			7–2
2	Juan de Mori (Catacaos)	7	5	1	1	18	5	+13	11				4–0	3–0		4–1	1–1	
3	Juventud América (Piura)	7	4	1	2	23	9	+14	9		0–2				1–0	4–0	12–1	
4	Deportivo Monteverde (Chulucanas)	7	3	3	1	13	10	+3	9				0–0		3–3		6–1	W.O.
5	Sport Halliburton (Negritos)	7	2	2	3	12	12	0	6			0–1						3–1
6	Sporting Cristal (Paita)	7	2	2	3	13	14	−1	6		1–1			2–3	1–1		4–1	
7	Estrella Roja (La Unión)	7	1	1	5	9	22	−13	3		0–4				2–4			3–1
8	Sport Tarapacá (El Alto)	7	0	0	7	9	30	−21	0			1–4	2–7			2–4		

Source: Diario La Crónica 1967
Legend: Blue = home team win; Yellow = draw; Red = away team win.

=== Liga Departamental de Puno ===
==== Standings ====
Pos	Team	Pld	W	D	L	GF	GA	GD	Pts	Qualification	UCA	AME	MAG	UVI
1	Unión Carolina	3	1	2	0	4	1	+3	4	Regional Stage		1–1	3–0	
2	American Star (Juliaca)	3	0	3	0	3	3	0	3				2–2	
3	Deportivo Magisterio (Huancané)	3	1	1	1	6	5	+1	3					4–0
4	Unión Victoria (Azángaro)	3	0	2	1	0	4	−4	2		0–0	0–0		

Source: Diario La Crónica 1967
Legend: Blue = home team win; Yellow = draw; Red = away team win.

=== Liga Departamental de Tumbes ===
==== Standings ====
Pos	Team	Pld	W	D	L	GF	GA	GD	Pts	Qualification	TUM	FER	BOL
1	Sport Tumbes	4	3	0	1	13	6	+7	6	Regional Stage		5–2	3–0
2	Deportivo Ferrocarril	4	3	0	1	6	6	0	6		3–1		W.O.
3	Sport Bolívar (Corrales)	4	0	0	4	1	8	−7	0		1–4	0–1	

Source: Diario La Crónica 1967
Legend: Blue = home team win; Yellow = draw; Red = away team win.

== Regional Stage ==
The following list shows the teams that qualified for the Regional Stage as departmental champions.

Department	Team	Location
Ancash	América de Samanco	Samanco
Apurímac	Libertad	Abancay
Arequipa	Melgar	Arequipa
Arequipa	Sportivo Huracán	Arequipa
Ayacucho	Deportivo Inti	Ayacucho
Cajamarca	Deportivo Municipal (Jaén)	Jaén
Cusco	Cienciano	Cusco
Huánuco	León de Huánuco	Huánuco
Ica	Octavio Espinosa	Ica
Ica	Deportivo Huracán	Ica
Junín	Unión Ocopilla	Huancayo
La Libertad	Alfonso Ugarte de Chiclín	Chiclín
La Libertad	Sanjuanista	Trujillo

Department	Team	Location
Lambayeque	Juan Aurich	Chiclayo
Lima	Óscar Berckemeyer	Huaral
Loreto	CNI	Iquitos
Madre de Dios	Sacachispas	Puerto Maldonado
Moquegua	Atlético Huracán	Moquegua
Pasco	Carlos Valdivieso	Pasco
Piura	Alianza Atlético	Sullana
Puno	Unión Carolina	Puno
San Martín	Atlético Belén	Moyobamba
Tacna	Coronel Bolognesi	Tacna
Tumbes	Sport Tumbes	Tumbes

=== Region Norte A ===
Region Norte A includes qualified teams from Cajamarca, Lambayeque, Tumbes and Piura region.

==== Standings ====
Pos	Team	Pld	W	D	L	GF	GA	GD	Pts	Qualification	AUR	AAS	TUM	MUN
1	Juan Aurich	6	5	1	0	25	5	+20	11	Final Stage		3–3	3–1	8–0
2	Alianza Atlético	6	4	1	1	23	9	+14	9		1–2		5–1	7–0
3	Sport Tumbes	6	2	0	4	8	14	−6	4		0–1	3–4		2–1
4	Deportivo Municipal (Jaén)	6	0	0	6	1	29	−28	0		0–8	0–3	0–1	

Source: Diario La Crónica 1967
Legend: Blue = home team win; Yellow = draw; Red = away team win.

=== Region Norte B ===
Region Norte B includes qualified teams from Ancash, Huánuco, La Libertad and Pasco region.

==== Standings ====
Pos	Team	Pld	W	D	L	GF	GA	GD	Pts	Qualification	UGA	AME	LEO	VAL
1	Alfonso Ugarte de Chiclín	6	5	1	0	10	2	+8	11	Final Stage		0–0	3–0	2–1
2	América de Samanco	6	2	2	2	8	7	+1	6		0–1		2–1	3–1
3	León de Huánuco	6	2	1	3	6	7	−1	5		0–1	0–0		4–1
4	Carlos Valdivieso	6	1	0	5	8	16	−8	2		1–3	4–3	0–1	

Source: Diario La Crónica
Legend: Blue = home team win; Yellow = draw; Red = away team win.

=== Region Centro ===
Region Centro includes qualified teams from Ica, Junín and Lima region.

==== Preliminary Stage ====
Team 1	Agg.	Team 2	1st leg	2nd leg
Octavio Espinosa	2–1	Deportivo Huracán	2–1	0–0

==== Group stage ====
Pos	Team	Pld	W	D	L	GF	GA	GD	Pts	Qualification	OCT	OCO	OSC
1	Octavio Espinosa	4	2	1	1	6	4	+2	5	Final Stage		1–0	3–1
2	Unión Ocopilla	4	2	0	2	0	0	0	4		1–0		2–0
3	Óscar Berckemeyer	4	1	1	2	4	7	−3	3		2–2	1–0	

Source: Diario La Crónica
Legend: Blue = home team win; Yellow = draw; Red = away team win.

=== Region Oriente ===
Region Oriente includes qualified teams from Loreto and San Martín region.

==== Title play-off ====
Team 1	Agg.	Team 2	1st leg	2nd leg
Atlético Belén	2–4	CNI	1–3	1–1

=== Region Sureste ===
Region Sureste includes qualified teams from Apurímac, Ayacucho, Cusco, Madre de Dios and Puno region. All matches were played in Cusco in a single round-robin format.

==== Standings ====
Pos	Team	Pld	W	D	L	GF	GA	GD	Pts	Qualification	CIE	UCA	INT	LIB	SAC
1	Cienciano	4	4	0	0	13	1	+12	8	Final Stage		3–0		2–0	
2	Unión Carolina	4	2	1	1	5	4	+1	5				3–0	1–1	
3	Deportivo Inti	4	2	0	2	5	8	−3	4		0–3				3–1
4	Libertad	4	1	1	2	4	5	−1	3				1–2		2–0
5	Sacachispas	4	0	0	4	2	11	−9	0		1–5	0–1			

Source: Diario La Crónica
Legend: Blue = home team win; Yellow = draw; Red = away team win.

=== Región Sur ===
Region Sur includes qualified teams from Arequipa, Moquegua and Tacna region.

==== Preliminary Stage ====
Team 1	Agg.	Team 2	1st leg	2nd leg
Melgar	7–2	Sportivo Huracán	1–1	6–1

==== Standings ====
Pos	Team	Pld	W	D	L	GF	GA	GD	Pts	Qualification	MEL	HUR	BOL
1	Melgar	4	3	1	0	7	2	+5	7	Final Stage		0–0	4–2
2	Atlético Huracán	4	2	1	1	6	4	+2	5		0–2		4–2
3	Coronel Bolognesi	4	0	0	4	4	11	−7	0		0–1	0–2	

Source: Diario La Crónica 1967
Legend: Blue = home team win; Yellow = draw; Red = away team win.

== Final Stage ==
=== Standings ===
Pos	Team	Pld	W	D	L	GF	GA	GD	Pts	Promotion
1	Alfonso Ugarte de Chiclín (C)	5	4	0	1	10	5	+5	8	1967 Primera División
2	Octavio Espinosa	5	3	1	1	10	6	+4	7	1967 Primera División
3	Juan Aurich	5	3	1	1	8	6	+2	7	1967 Primera División
4	Melgar	5	2	1	2	10	3	+7	5	
5	CNI	5	0	2	3	6	17	−11	2	
6	Cienciano	5	0	1	4	4	11	−7	1	

Source: Diario La Crónica 1967
(C) Champions

=== Results ===
==== Round 1 ====
14 May 1967	Juan Aurich	3–1	Cienciano	Nacional, Lima

14 May 1967	Alfonso Ugarte de Chiclín	1–0	Melgar	Nacional, Lima

14 May 1967	Octavio Espinosa	3–1	CNI	Nacional, Lima

==== Round 2 ====
18 May 1967	Melgar	8–0	CNI	Nacional, Lima

18 May 1967	Alfonso Ugarte de Chiclín	2–0	Cienciano	Nacional, Lima

18 May 1967	Octavio Espinosa	3–0	Juan Aurich	Nacional, Lima

==== Round 3 ====
21 May 1967	Juan Aurich	2–2	CNI	Nacional, Lima

21 May 1967	Melgar	2–1	Cienciano	Nacional, Lima

21 May 1967	Alfonso Ugarte de Chiclín	4–1	Octavio Espinosa	Nacional, Lima

==== Round 4 ====
25 May 1967	CNI	1–1	Cienciano	Nacional, Lima

25 May 1967	Octavio Espinosa	0–0	Melgar	Nacional, Lima

25 May 1967	Juan Aurich	2–0	Alfonso Ugarte de Chiclín	Nacional, Lima

==== Round 5 ====
28 May 1967	Octavio Espinosa	3–1	Cienciano	Nacional, Lima

28 May 1967	Juan Aurich	1–0	Melgar	Nacional, Lima

28 May 1967	Alfonso Ugarte de Chiclín	3–2	CNI	Nacional, Lima

== See also ==
- 1967 Torneo Descentralizado
- 1967 Peruvian Segunda División
