= 1971 Torneo Descentralizado =

Torneo Descentralizado
- Season: 1971
- Dates: 30 May 1971 – 8 January 1972
- Champions: Universitario; 14th Primera División title
- Relegated: ADO; Octavio Espinosa; Porvenir Miraflores
- 1972 Copa Libertadores: Universitario; Alianza Lima
- Top goalscorer: Manuel Mellán (25 goals)

The 1971 Torneo Descentralizado was the 55th season of the highest division of Peruvian football. The number of teams increased from 14 to 16 teams as four teams gained promotion. The last three teams were relegated from the first division.

The national champion was Universitario. ADO, Octavio Espinosa and Porvenir Miraflores were relegated.

== Teams ==
=== Team changes ===
Promoted from 1970 Segunda División	Promoted from 1971 Copa Perú	Relegated from 1970 Primera División
▲ADO (1st)	▲ Melgar (1st) ▲ Unión Tumán (2nd) ▲ José Gálvez (3rd)	▼ Deportivo SIMA (13th) ▼ Atlético Grau (14th)

=== Stadia locations ===
Locations of the 1971 Primera División teams

Team	City
ADO	Callao
Alianza Lima	La Victoria, Lima
Atlético Torino	Talara
Carlos A. Mannucci	Trujillo
Defensor Arica	Breña, Lima
Defensor Lima	Breña, Lima
Deportivo Municipal	Cercado de Lima
José Gálvez	Chimbote
Juan Aurich	Chiclayo
Melgar	Arequipa
Octavio Espinosa	Ica
Porvenir Miraflores	Miraflores, Lima
Sport Boys	Callao
Sporting Cristal	Rímac, Lima
Unión Tumán	Tumán
Universitario	Breña, Lima

== League table ==
=== Standings ===
Pos	Team	Pld	W	D	L	GF	GA	GD	Pts	Qualification or relegation
1	Universitario (C)	30	18	10	2	57	20	+37	46	1972 Copa Libertadores
2	Alianza Lima	30	16	8	6	50	25	+25	40	1972 Copa Libertadores
3	Defensor Lima	30	14	11	5	48	30	+18	39	
4	Sporting Cristal	30	13	12	5	50	36	+14	38	
5	Deportivo Municipal	30	14	9	7	47	34	+13	37	
6	Juan Aurich	30	15	6	9	48	37	+11	36	
7	Melgar	30	10	14	6	40	30	+10	34	
8	Atlético Torino	30	10	10	10	30	38	−8	30	
9	Sport Boys	30	9	11	10	30	27	+3	29	
10	Unión Tumán	30	9	8	13	38	50	−12	26	
11	Carlos A. Mannucci	30	7	10	13	43	49	−6	24	
12	Defensor Arica	30	8	8	14	30	46	−16	24	
13	José Gálvez	30	5	10	15	27	50	−23	20	
14	ADO (R)	30	5	10	15	32	56	−24	20	1972 Segunda División
15	Octavio Espinosa (R)	30	6	7	17	26	43	−17	19	1972 Copa Perú
16	Porvenir Miraflores (R)	30	3	12	15	38	63	−25	18	1972 Segunda División

(C) Champions; (R) Relegated

== Results ==
Home \ Away	ADO	ALI	TOR	CAM	DAR	DLI	MUN	GAL	AUR	MEL	OCT	POR	SBA	CRI	TUM	UNI
ADO		0–2	—	—	—	—	—	—	—	—	—	—	2–1	2–1	—	2–5
Alianza Lima	4–2		1–2	2–1	3–0	0–0	0–0	3–0	2–0	1–1	1–1	2–0	0–0	2–0	4–1	2–1
Atlético Torino	—	1–1		—	—	—	—	—	—	—	—	—	1–0	1–1	—	0–0
Carlos A. Mannucci	—	2–5	—		—	—	—	—	—	—	—	—	2–1	1–1	—	0–1
Defensor Arica	—	0–2	—	—		—	—	—	—	—	—	—	1–2	1–2	—	0–2
Defensor Lima	—	2–1	—	—	—		—	—	—	—	—	—	2–1	0–0	—	3–0
Deportivo Municipal	—	3–1	—	—	—	—		—	—	—	—	—	0–0	2–0	—	1–1
José Gálvez	—	1–0	—	—	—	—	—		—	—	—	—	0–0	0–4	—	0–4
Juan Aurich	—	1–0	—	—	—	—	—	—		—	—	—	2–1	1–3	—	1–1
Melgar	—	1–3	—	—	—	—	—	—	—		—	—	0–0	0–0	—	0–0
Octavio Espinosa	—	1–2	—	—	—	—	—	—	—	—		—	0–2	1–3	—	0–2
Porvenir Miraflores	—	0–1	—	—	—	—	—	—	—	—	—		0–0	2–2	—	0–3
Sport Boys	1–0	1–1	0–0	3–1	2–0	0–0	0–1	4–1	0–2	1–0	2–0	2–2		0–1	3–4	0–0
Sporting Cristal	1–1	2–1	2–1	1–0	2–2	4–2	0–0	2–0	3–2	1–4	1–1	5–2	2–2		4–2	1–2
Unión Tumán	—	0–2	—	—	—	—	—	—	—	—	—	—	0–1	0–0		1–1
Universitario	3–1	1–1	1–1	5–1	2–1	4–1	2–0	2–0	1–0	1–1	4–0	2–1	2–0	1–1	3–0	

Updated to match(es) played on unknown. Source: Diario El Comercio, La Prensa and Crónica.
Legend: Blue = home team win; Yellow = draw; Red = away team win.

== Top scorers ==
Player	Nationality	Goals	Club
Manuel Mellán	Peru	25	Deportivo Municipal

== See also ==
- 1971 Peruvian Segunda División
- 1971 Copa Perú
