= Mariano Melgar =

Peruvian poet and activist

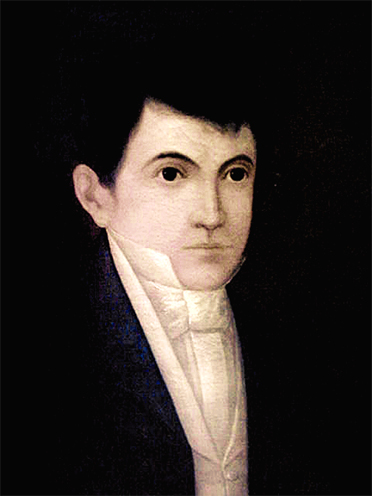
- Born: 10 August 1790; Arequipa, Viceroyalty of Peru, Spanish Empire
- Died: 12 March 1815 (aged 24); Umachiri, Peru
- Education: National University of San Marcos
- Occupations: Poet; Teacher

Mariano Lorenzo Melgar Valdivieso (10 August 1790 – 12 March 1815) was a Peruvian revolutionary, poet, artist, translator and patriot soldier during the Peruvian War of Independence from Spain. As a poet, Melgar became one of the most prominent romantic poets of Peru in the 19th century history, best known for his poetic love songs known as yaravíes. He is often considered to be the equivalent of the Ecuadorian José Joaquín Olmedo and the Cuban José Martí as patriots of their respective countries.

== Biography ==
Mariano Melgar was born in Arequipa on 10 August 1790, to Don Juan de Dios Melgar y Sanabria and Doña Andrea de Valdivieso, members of distinguished families of the time. He was baptized two days after birth at Arequipa's San Francisco cathedral. Growing up in Arequipa, he received his early education at the San Francisco convent and the Seminario de San Jerónimo. At a young age he demonstrated a gift for writing poetry and in his later years he was said to have fallen in love with María Santos Corrales, whom he romantically mentioned as Silvia in his poetry writings. The girl - born in 1797 - was seven years his junior and her parents opposed their relationship.

At the age of twenty his parents sent him to Lima to study law. The desire for independence in Lima was very strong and the country had promulgated a liberal constitution in 1812. Melgar became very well educated in the fields of history, geography, philosophy and mathematics. After briefly teaching what he had learned in Lima, he decided to return to Arequipa, only to find out that Silvia had been persuaded by her parents to be against a relationship with him. Melgar, in desperate sadness, left for Majes (west of Arequipa). Eventually, he established contacts with other independence revolutionaries of the time. In 1814, the revolution of Mateo Pumacahua took place in Cusco, which upset the apparent tranquillity of the Spanish viceroyalty of Peru and prompted Melgar to join the independence cause and march to combat. After winning the combat of Apacheta in Arequipa, the army marched towards Puno and fought on 11 March 1815 at the Battle of Umachiri, in which Melgar fought bravely directing the revolutionary army's artillery. The patriots were defeated and made prisoners, including the young Melgar. The Spanish General Ramirez, after holding Melgar captive, ordered his officers to place him before a firing squad. Melgar died in the morning of 12 March 1815, at the age of 24.

In a brief letter before his death, Melgar famously wrote to Spanish officials: "Cover your eyes, since you're the ones who must be disabused because America will be free in less than ten years!" Nine years later, on 9 December 1824, the Battle of Ayacucho, or "La Quinua", took place at Pampa de La Quinua, a few miles away from Ayacucho, near the town of Quinua. This battle – between the royalist (Spanish) and nationalist (republican) troops – sealed the independence of Peru and South America from Spain. On 2 July 1964, in recognition of his bravery in the first battles before independence, Peru officially recognized Mariano Melgar as one of the country's first patriots and soldiers for the revolution for independence. A memorial to Mariano Melgar can be found at the Apacheta cemetery in Arequipa, Peru.

== Translation ==
He translated Ovid's and Virgil's poetry into Spanish.

== See also ==
- History of Peru
- Spanish conquest of Peru
