= 1971 Copa Perú =

Copa Perú
- Season: 1971
- Champions: Melgar
- Matches: 15
- Goals: 46 (3.07 per match)
- Top goalscorer: Luis Ponce Arroé (7)
- Highest scoring: Unión Tumán 4–3 Cienciano; Only National Stage taken into consideration

The 1971 Copa Perú season (Spanish: Copa Perú 1971), the promotion tournament of Peruvian football.

In this tournament, after many qualification rounds, each one of the 24 departments in which Peru is politically divided qualified a team. Those teams, plus the team relegated from First Division on the last year, enter in two more rounds and finally 6 of them qualify for the Final round, staged in Lima (the capital).

Three teams were promoted to play in 1971 First Division.

== Finalists teams ==
The following list shows the teams that qualified for the Final Stage.

Department	Team	Location
Ancash	José Gálvez	Ancash
Arequipa	Melgar	Arequipa
Cusco	Cienciano	Cusco
Lima	Social Huando	Huaral
Lambayeque	Unión Tumán	Tumán
Loreto	CNI	Iquitos

== Final Stage ==
=== Standings ===
Pos	Team	Pld	W	D	L	GF	GA	GD	Pts	Promotion
1	Melgar (C)	5	3	2	0	13	4	+9	8	1971 Primera División
2	Unión Tumán	5	3	1	1	8	6	+2	7	1971 Primera División
3	José Gálvez	5	3	1	1	6	7	−1	7	1971 Primera División
4	CNI	5	2	2	1	9	6	+3	6	
5	Cienciano	5	1	0	4	8	9	−1	2	
6	Social Huando	5	0	0	5	2	14	−12	0	

(C) Champions

=== Results ===
==== Round 1 ====
25 April 1971	CNI	3–0	Cienciano	Nacional, Lima

25 April 1971	Melgar	5–1	José Gálvez	Nacional, Lima

25 April 1971	Unión Tumán	1–0	Social Huando	Nacional, Lima

==== Round 2 ====
28 April 1971	José Gálvez	2–2	CNI	Nacional, Lima

28 April 1971	Unión Tumán	4–3	Cienciano	Nacional, Lima

28 April 1971	Melgar	5–1	Social Huando	Nacional, Lima

==== Round 3 ====
2 May 1971	José Gálvez	1–0	Cienciano	Nacional, Lima

2 May 1971	CNI	2–1	Social Huando	Nacional, Lima

2 May 1971	Melgar	1–1	Unión Tumán	Nacional, Lima

==== Round 4 ====
5 May 1971	José Gálvez	1–0	Social Huando	Nacional, Lima

5 May 1971	Unión Tumán	2–1	CNI	Nacional, Lima

5 May 1971	Melgar	1–0	Cienciano	Nacional, Lima

==== Round 5 ====
8 May 1971	Cienciano	5–0	Social Huando	Nacional, Lima

8 May 1971	Melgar	1–1	CNI	Nacional, Lima

10 May 1971	José Gálvez	1–0	Unión Tumán	Nacional, Lima
