= Estadio José Picasso Peratta =

Multi-use stadium in Ica, Peru

Coordinates: 14.0680°S 75.7390°W

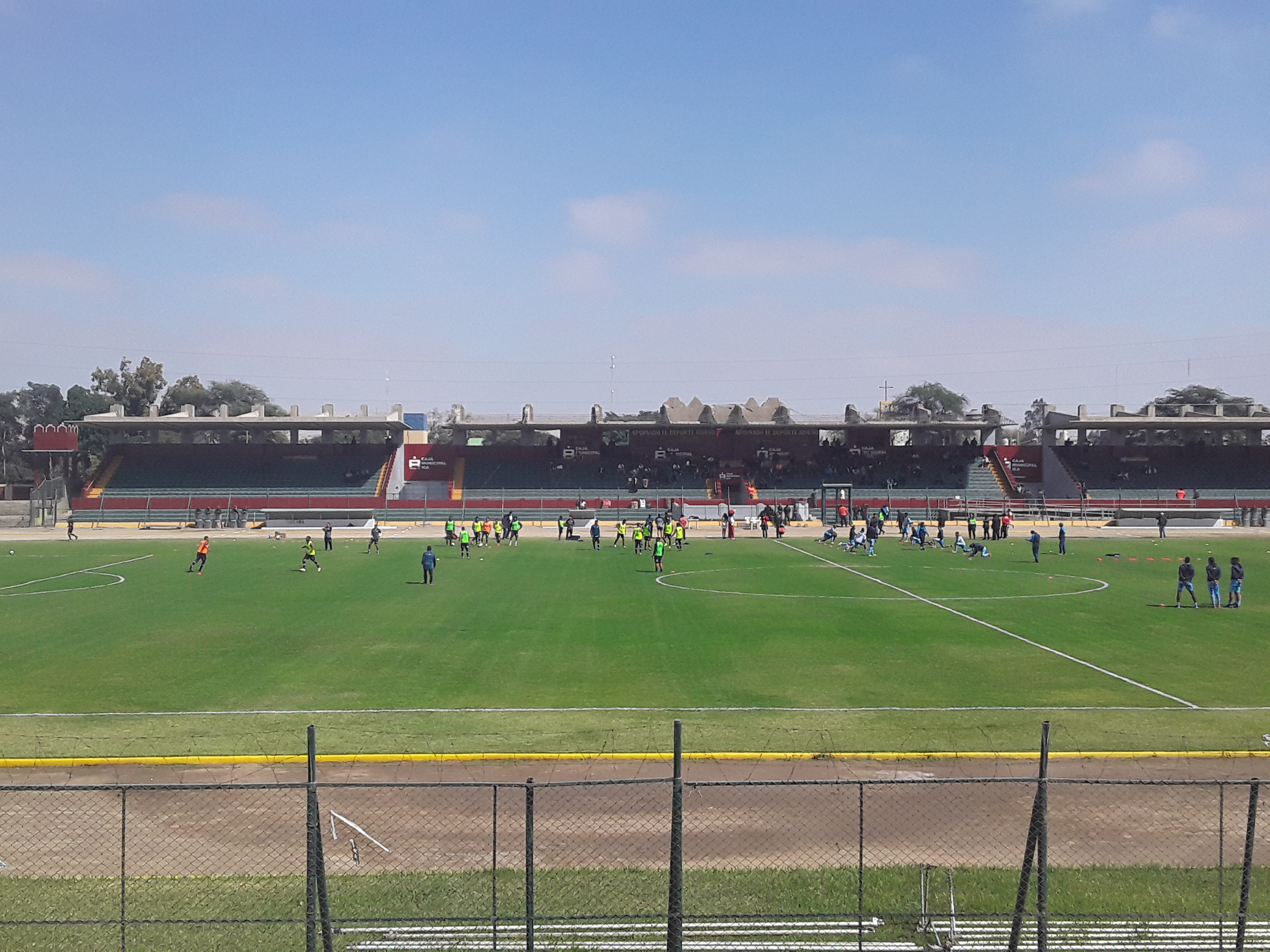
Estadio José Picasso Peratta

Estadio José Picasso Peratta is a multi-use stadium in Ica, Peru. It is currently used by football (soccer) teams Octavio Espinoza and Estudiantes de Medicina. The stadium holds 8,000 people, but the owners are planning to expand it to 15,000. Its name comes from a former mayor of Ica, José Picasso Perata, which together with the Picasso family helped to build and finance the stadium.

The stadium was remodeled in 2009.
