= 1970 Copa Perú =

Copa Perú
- Season: 1970
- Champions: Atlético Torino
- Matches: 15
- Goals: 35 (2.33 per match)
- Top goalscorer: Fernando Guerrero (4)
- Highest scoring: Defensor Casagrande 6–3 Garcilaso; Only National Stage taken into consideration

The 1970 Copa Perú season (Spanish: Copa Perú 1970), the promotion tournament of Peruvian football.

In this tournament, after many qualification rounds, each one of the 24 departments in which Peru is politically divided qualified a team. Those teams, plus the team relegated from First Division on the last year, enter in two more rounds and finally 6 of them qualify for the Final round, staged in Lima (the capital).

The champion, Torino, was promoted to play in 1970 First Division.

== Finalists teams ==
The following list shows the teams that qualified for the Final Stage.

Department	Team	Location
Arequipa	Melgar	Arequipa
Cusco	Deportivo Garcilaso	Cusco
Junín	Unión Ocopilla	Junín
La Libertad	Defensor Casa Grande	Trujillo
Loreto	CNI	Iquitos
Piura	Atlético Torino	Talara

== Final Stage ==
=== Standings ===
Pos	Team	Pld	W	D	L	GF	GA	GD	Pts	Promotion
1	Atlético Torino (C)	5	4	0	1	10	4	+6	8	1970 Primera División
2	Melgar	5	3	1	1	7	3	+4	7	
3	CNI	5	2	1	2	7	8	−1	5	
4	Unión Ocopilla	5	2	1	2	7	8	−1	5	
5	Defensor Casa Grande	5	1	2	2	10	11	−1	4	
6	Deportivo Garcilaso	5	0	1	4	4	11	−7	1	

(C) Champions

=== Results ===
==== Round 1 ====
26 April 1970	CNI	1–0	Melgar	Nacional, Lima

26 April 1970	Unión Ocopilla	1–1	Defensor Casa Grande	Nacional, Lima

26 April 1970	Atlético Torino	1–0	Deportivo Garcilaso	Nacional, Lima

==== Round 2 ====
29 April 1970	Unión Ocopilla	2–0	Deportivo Garcilaso	Nacional, Lima

29 April 1970	Melgar	1–1	Defensor Casa Grande	Nacional, Lima

29 April 1970	Atlético Torino	4–1	CNI	Nacional, Lima

==== Round 3 ====
3 May 1970	Melgar	4–1	Unión Ocopilla	Nacional, Lima

3 May 1970	Atlético Torino	3–1	Defensor Casa Grande	Nacional, Lima

3 May 1970	CNI	1–1	Deportivo Garcilaso	Nacional, Lima

==== Round 4 ====
6 May 1970	Melgar	1–0	Deportivo Garcilaso	Nacional, Lima

6 May 1970	CNI	3–1	Defensor Casa Grande	Nacional, Lima

6 May 1970	Atlético Torino	3–1	Unión Ocopilla	Nacional, Lima

==== Round 5 ====
10 May 1970	Unión Ocopilla	2–1	CNI	Nacional, Lima

10 May 1970	Defensor Casa Grande	6–3	Deportivo Garcilaso	Nacional, Lima

10 May 1970	Melgar	1–0	Atlético Torino	Nacional, Lima
