= Octavio Espinosa de Ica =

Octavio Espinosa
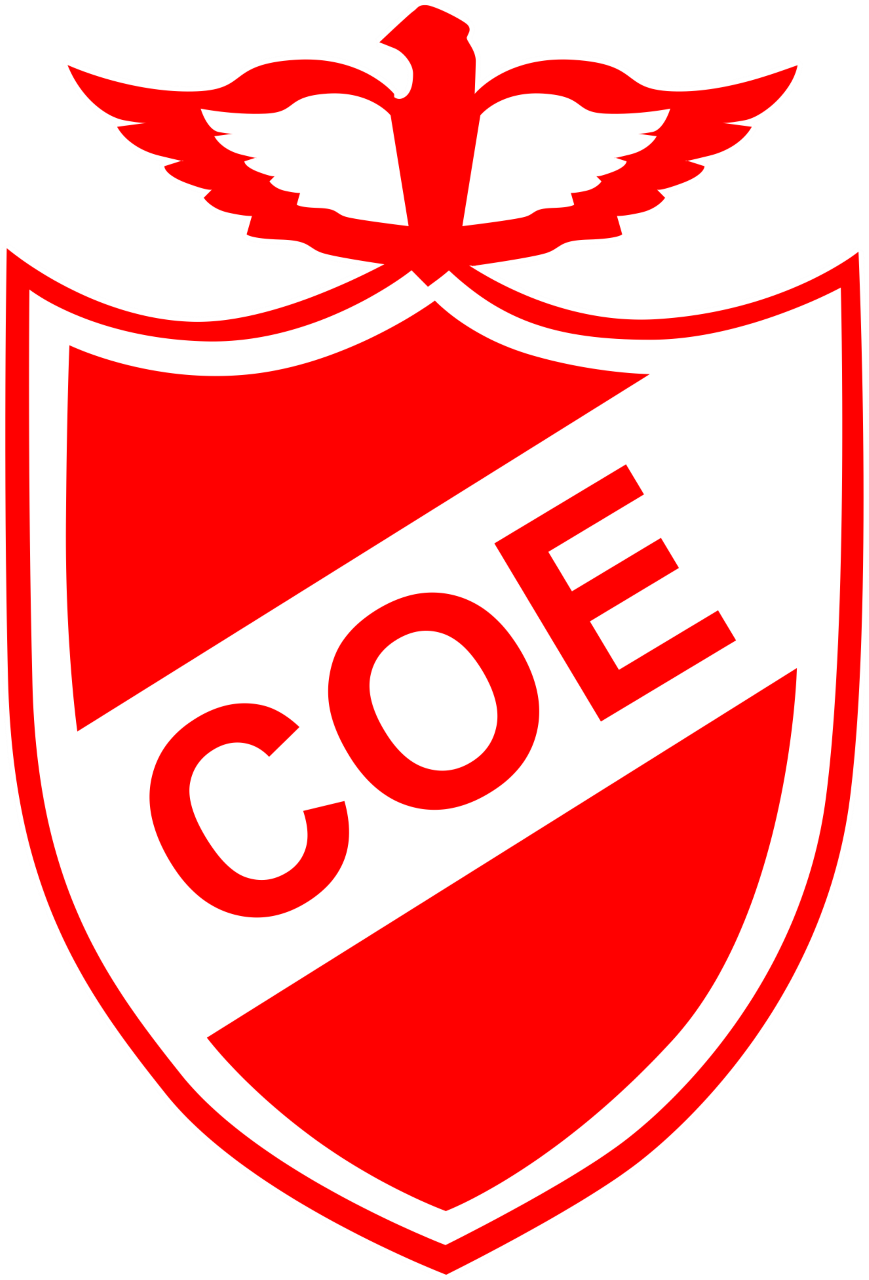
- Full name: Club Social Deportivo Octavio Espinosa
- Nicknames: Los rojos, El solitario del sur
- Founded: May 21, 1923
- Ground: Estadio José Picasso Peratta, Ica
- Capacity: 8,000
- Chairman: Martín Alarcon Quispe
- Manager: Jesús Torrealva
- League: Copa Perú
- 2021: Eliminated in the Regional Phase
| Home colours | Away colours |

Club Social Deportivo Octavio Espinosa is a Peruvian football club, playing in the city of Ica, Peru.

== History ==
=== Foundation ===
In the early 20th century, in what is now Paita Street, located in the northern area of downtown Ica, there was a sector known as Malambito. It consisted of a cluster of modest homes, mostly huts and basic masonry structures, inhabited primarily by working-class residents.

In this setting, on May 21, 1923, at the home of the Arias family, located in Villagarcía Alley, the first meeting was held to establish a club that would represent the neighborhood. At the suggestion of Bartolomé Apéstegui, it was decided to name the club after the aviator Octavio Espinosa. Doña Justa Arias, the family matriarch, took charge of washing the team’s jerseys, which from the very beginning adopted red as their official color.

Among the founders were residents of present-day Paita Street, such as Cornelio Fuentes Cordero, one of the first goalkeepers of the Solitario del Sur, and father of Félix Fuentes, who later played as a defender for Alianza Lima and was also the father of renowned volleyball player Luisa Fuentes. The Olaechea Uribe family also took part, with their son Andrés being the father of Jorge “Mango” Olaechea.

The first appointed president was Roberto Falconí Huasasquiche, although his tenure was short-lived. He was succeeded by Agustín Bocanegra, an entrepreneur with a journalistic vocation, under whose leadership the club experienced its initial development. In its early years, the club competed in the two leagues existing in the city: the Liga Asociativa de Ica and the Liga Federativa de Ica. These leagues merged in 1926 to form the Liga Distrital de Ica, of which Club Octavio Espinosa was a founding member.

Over time, the club has come to be regarded as part of the sporting heritage of the city of Ica.

=== Name and spelling ===
Octavio Espinosa Gonzales was a pioneer aviator and journalist born in Lima in 1882, who was devoted to civil aviation. In 1920, he was the victim of a tragic accident with American airplane pilot Walter Pack in which he hit the hacienda Oquendo. Oral tradition has it that Espinosa landed in Ica on one of his flights; however, the experienced and highly regarded journalist Jose Ica Lujan, who thoroughly reviewed the archives of the newspaper La Voz de Ica, noted that there was no journalistic record of such an event, which by its nature would have been recorded in the city at the time. Whatever occurred, the residents of the street Paita apparently took that reference to christen the team.

Although there are occasional spelling mistakes in the name of the club, sometimes written as "Octavio Espinoza" (with "z"), the origin of the name, described above, removes any doubt about the correct spelling. The club is called "Octavio Espinosa" (with "s"). Because of the existence of both surnames with variant spellings, sometimes it was erroneously written with "z". However, the newspaper La Voz de Ica received in the seventies a letter from Don Octavio Espinosa Sanchez, son of Don Octavio Espinosa Gonzales, requesting a clarification because his surname was spelled with an "s" and surmised the founders' intention had been to name the club after his father and that there had been a corruption of the name of the club in the oral tradition. Therefore, La Voz de Ica, the oldest newspaper of Ica, and DeChalaca.com, spell the name of the club as "Octavio Espinosa," even though in some official documents it is erroneously spelled with "z".

=== Invitation to the First Division (1966) ===
Between 1961 and 1965, Club Octavio Espinosa experienced one of the most successful periods in its history, winning five consecutive titles in the Liga Distrital de Ica. As a result of this outstanding campaign, the club was invited by the Peruvian Football Federation to participate in the inaugural Torneo Descentralizado in 1966.

The club made its top-flight debut on August 14 of that year, suffering a 1–0 defeat to Defensor Arica at the José Picasso Peratta Stadium. The surnames Tipiani, Campos, Benítez, Ramírez, Martínez, Anchante, Ormeño, Herrera, Franco, Uribe, and Jhong are remembered as the first players to wear the club's red colors in the Peruvian Primera División.

=== Torneo Descentralizado ===
The red team from Ica remained in the top flight until the 1971 Torneo Descentralizado. During this period, the club generally occupied the lower positions in the standings, although it managed to avoid relegation. Its best campaign in the First Division came in 1968, under Paraguayan coach Miguel Ortega, when the team finished in fifth place.

In 1970, the team placed sixth in the first stage of the Descentralizado, earning a spot in the championship playoff round. However, in 1971 it was unable to maintain its status in the top tier, finishing second from bottom and being relegated.

During this initial spell in the First Division, notable players included goalkeepers Mario Tipiani and Fernando Cárpena; defenders Guillermo Quijandría, Adolfo Donayre, Víctor Gallegos and Demetrio “Chimango” Mazzo; midfielder Antonio Franco; and forwards Urbano Flores, Ricardo Ormeño and Manuel Mellán.

=== During the Regional Championships ===
The club was one of the teams invited to participate in the 1983 Peruvian Segunda División, where it even reached first place at one point, although it ultimately fell short of winning the title.

In 1984, it joined the top flight with the introduction of Peru’s Regional Championships. During the initial stage, the team competed in the Metropolitan Zone, finishing last under the management of Hernán Saavedra. Having failed to qualify for the Descentralizado, it played in the Intermedia Tournament, facing top teams from the Segunda División (in Lima) and provincial leagues across the country.

In 1985, under the guidance of Teófilo “Kilo” Lobatón, the team finished fifth in the Metropolitan Zone and qualified for the Descentralizado, where it secured ninth place.

In 1986, the club once again finished fifth in the Metropolitan Zone and advanced to the Descentralizado, where it was placed in Group “C” and finished fourth. However, in 1987, following a poor campaign, it finished last in the Metropolitan Zone and dropped to the Intermedia Tournament.

In 1988, the Ica-based side finished second in Group “B” of the Metropolitan Zone, earning promotion to that year’s Descentralizado. In that competition, it achieved an impressive fifth-place finish—highlighted by a controversial 4–1 win over Unión Huaral—and qualified for the championship playoff round, where it even recorded a 5–2 victory against Alianza Lima. That same season, Alberto “Cucaracha” Mora emerged as the league’s top scorer with 15 goals.

In the 1989 season, the team finished second from bottom in the Metropolitan Zone – Regional I, and ninth in Regional II. In 1990, it again placed second from bottom in Regional I and only reached eighth in Regional II. Finally, in 1991, Octavio Espinosa finished last in the overall Metropolitan standings and, after failing to qualify for the 1992 Torneo Descentralizado, was relegated to Zone II of the 1992 Peruvian Torneo Zonal.

During this final spell in the top division, notable players included goalkeepers Eusebio Farfán and Ángel Cornejo; defenders Nibardo Aguirre, Frank Ruiz, Octavio Vidales, Julio Jiménez, Arturo Ulloa and Ever Huamán; midfielders César Romano and Félix Rubianes; and forwards César Oré, Domingo Farfán, Rolando Asseretto, as well as brothers Freddy and Jesús Torrealva.

=== Return to the lower leagues ===
In 1992, during the Torneo Zonal II, the team from Ica finished in tenth place. The following year, in the 1993 Segunda División, it placed second from bottom, resulting in its return to the Copa Perú.

In the 1994 edition, the club competed in the Regional Stage, where it was crowned champion after defeating Deportivo Cadet in the final, thus qualifying for the Interregional Stage. There, it faced José Gálvez FBC, which eliminated them by winning both matches and secured a spot in the Finalísima.

In the 2016 Copa Perú, the club qualified for the National Stage as departmental runner-up. It finished 15th in the overall standings and advanced through the playoff round after eliminating DIM due to a better overall ranking. In the round of 16, it was eliminated by Binacional with an aggregate score of 5-2.

In the 2019 edition, the club once again qualified as departmental runner-up to the National Stage of the Copa Perú. After finishing 15th overall in the first phase, it defeated Deportivo Las Américas in the round of 32, but was later eliminated in the round of 16 by Credicoop San Cristóbal with a 5-1 aggregate score.

In the 2021 Copa Perú, the club participated once more but was eliminated in Phase 1 by Unión San Martín after drawing 0-0 at home and losing 1-0 away in Pisco.

== Honours ==
=== Senior titles ===
Keys

- Record
- ^{(s)} Shared record

| Type | Competition | Titles | Runner-up | Winning years | Runner-up years |
|---|---|---|---|---|---|
| National (League) | Copa Perú | — | 1 | — | 1967 |
| Half-year / Short tournament (League) | Torneo Zona Metropolitana | — | 1 | — | 1988 Grupo B |
| Regional (League) | Reclasificatorio Regional | — | 1 | — | 1974 Región 8 |
| Regional (League) | Región Centro | 2 | — | 1967, 1973 | — |
| Regional (League) | Región IV | 2 | — | 1980, 1994 | — |
| Regional (League) | Liga Departamental de Ica | 5 | 3 | 1972, 1973, 1978, 1979, 1981 | 1980, 2016, 2019 |
| Regional (League) | Liga Provincial de Ica | 6 | 2 | 1978, 1979, 1981, 2012, 2013, 2019 | 2016, 2022 |
| Regional (League) | Liga Distrital de Ica | 25 | 9 | 1939, 1940, 1941, 1942, 1943, 1945, 1947, 1948, 1949, 1950, 1951, 1952, 1953, 1955, 1956, 1961, 1962, 1963, 1964, 1965, 1972, 1973, 1977, 2014, 2018 | 1946, 1954, 2010, 2012, 2013, 2016, 2019, 2022, 2023 |
| Regional (League) | Segunda División Distrital de Ica | 1 | — | 2025 | — |

== See also ==
- List of football clubs in Peru
- Peruvian football league system
