= 1966 Torneo Descentralizado =

Torneo Descentralizado
- Season: 1966
- Dates: 13 August 1966 – 19 February 1967
- Champions: Universitario (11th title)
- Runner up: Sport Boys
- Relegated: Melgar; Alfonso Ugarte de Chiclín; Octavio Espinosa; Carlos Concha
- 1967 Copa Libertadores: Universitario; Sport Boys
- Matches: 182
- Goals: 542 (2.98 per match)
- Top goalscorer: Teófilo Cubillas (19 goals)

The 1966 Torneo Descentralizado was the 50th season of the highest division of Peruvian football. This season marked the first time the Primera División was named the Descentralizado because teams outside Lima and Callao were invited for the first time making it the first national championship in Peru.

The first match of the season was played on 13 August 1966 between Universitario and Mariscal Sucre in the Estadio Nacional. Shortly after this match, the first match to feature a team outside the Lima and Callao region was between Sporting Cristal and Alfonso Ugarte de Chiclín in the same stadium on the same day.

The champion was Universitario. Four teams were relegated at the end of the season. Carlos Concha was relegated to the 1967 Segunda División as the last placed team. In addition, Octavio Espinosa, Alfonso Ugarte, and Melgar were relegated as they needed to place seventh or higher to remain in the first division. They needed to play the 1967 Copa Perú to attain promotion to the first division.

== Election of teams ==
It was established that fourteen teams would participate in this first national tournament. Given that the necessary financial support to fund a complete transformation was lacking, the process was carried out gradually. Thus, the first Descentralizado tournament retained a still centralist structure: ten teams from Lima and four from the provinces.

The four teams invited to play in the inaugural national championship were the district champions of Arequipa, Ica, Piura, and Trujillo: Melgar, Octavio Espinosa, Atlético Grau, and Alfonso Ugarte de Chiclín, respectively.

== Teams ==
=== Team changes ===
Promoted from 1965 Segunda División	Invited	Relegated from 1965 Primera División
▲ Mariscal Sucre (1st)	▲ Alfonso Ugarte de Chiclín (1st Trujillo) ▲ Atlético Grau (1st Piura) ▲ Melgar (1st Arequipa) ▲ Octavio Espinosa (1st Ica)	▼ Ciclista Lima (10th)

=== Stadia locations ===
Locations of the 1966 Primera División teams

Team	City	Mannager
Alfonso Ugarte de Chiclín	Trujillo	(Argentina) Ángel Fernández Roca
Alianza Lima	La Victoria, Lima	(Brazil) Jaime de Almeida
Atlético Grau	Piura	(Hungary) László Pákozdi
Carlos Concha	Callao	(Peru) Alfonso Huapaya
Centro Iqueño	Cercado de Lima	(Paraguay) Miguel Ortega
Defensor Arica	Breña, Lima	(Chile) Hugo Tassara
Defensor Lima	Breña, Lima	(Peru) Juan Honores
Deportivo Municipal	Cercado de Lima	(Peru) Luis Guzmán
Mariscal Sucre	La Victoria, Lima	(Peru) Clemente Velásquez
Melgar	Arequipa	(Brazil) Gilberto dos Santos
Octavio Espinosa	Ica	(Peru) Pablo Pasache
Sport Boys	Callao	(Peru) José Chiarella
Sporting Cristal	Rímac, Lima	(Peru) Alberto Terry
Universitario	Breña, Lima	(Peru) Marcos Calderón

The whole tournament was played in seven stadiums:

Stadium	City
Estadio Nacional	Lima
Estadio San Martín de Porres	Lima
Estadio Teodoro Lolo Fernández	Lima
Estadio Melgar	Arequipa
Estadio Miguel Grau	Piura
Estadio Modelo de Trujillo	Trujillo
Estadio Municipal de Ica	Ica

== League table ==
=== Standings ===
Pos	Team	Pld	W	D	L	GF	GA	GD	Pts	Qualification or relegation
1	Universitario (C)	26	19	3	4	65	27	+38	41	1967 Copa Libertadores
2	Sport Boys	26	15	5	6	41	21	+20	35	1967 Copa Libertadores
3	Alianza Lima	26	14	5	7	58	34	+24	33	
4	Sporting Cristal	26	12	6	8	36	24	+12	30	
5	Centro Iqueño	26	13	4	9	31	27	+4	30	
6	Atlético Grau	26	10	9	7	36	32	+4	29	
7	Defensor Lima	26	10	8	8	49	36	+13	28	
8	Melgar (R)	26	12	4	10	43	30	+13	28	1967 Copa Perú
9	Defensor Arica	26	10	8	8	31	25	+6	28	
10	Mariscal Sucre	26	7	7	12	30	40	−10	21	
11	Deportivo Municipal	26	9	3	14	41	54	−13	21	
12	Alfonso Ugarte de Chiclín (R)	26	7	3	16	28	60	−32	17	1967 Copa Perú
13	Octavio Espinosa (R)	26	3	6	17	26	52	−26	12	1967 Copa Perú
14	Carlos Concha (R)	26	4	3	19	29	79	−50	11	1967 Segunda División

(C) Champions; (R) Relegated

== Results ==
Home \ Away	UGA	ALI	GRA	CAR	IQU	DAR	DLI	MUN	MEL	MSU	OCT	SBA	CRI	UNI
Alfonso Ugarte de Chiclín		1–2	0–0	1–0	3–2	2–2	3–1	2–0	0–2	1–0	1–0	2–3	0–2	0–2
Alianza Lima	4–3		0–0	7–1	0–1	1–1	3–1	3–0	2–0	6–3	4–1	1–1	1–1	3–2
Atlético Grau	2–0	1–0		2–1	0–1	1–0	1–1	2–1	3–4	1–1	2–0	1–4	2–0	1–3
Carlos Concha	4–3	1–1	0–2		0–4	1–2	1–5	3–2	3–2	1–1	1–1	0–4	1–3	2–3
Centro Iqueño	2–0	2–1	1–0	1–0		0–1	1–1	3–2	1–0	1–0	2–2	1–2	2–1	1–2
Defensor Arica	3–0	2–3	1–3	5–0	1–0		0–0	2–1	1–0	0–0	1–3	0–0	2–0	1–2
Defensor Lima	8–1	4–2	1–1	6–1	2–1	1–1		2–0	0–1	2–1	3–2	0–1	1–1	2–1
Deportivo Municipal	2–1	0–8	3–3	6–1	1–1	3–2	1–2		2–1	2–0	3–1	0–1	1–0	1–3
Melgar	6–0	2–0	1–1	4–0	0–1	2–0	2–2	2–1		5–1	3–1	2–0	3–0	0–1
Mariscal Sucre	3–1	2–3	1–2	3–0	1–0	0–2	4–2	2–1	0–0		1–0	1–1	0–3	1–1
Octavio Espinosa	3–2	0–1	3–3	2–2	0–1	0–1	0–0	0–0	1–1	0–2		1–3	2–4	0–4
Sport Boys	0–1	0–2	1–0	2–1	3–0	2–1	2–0	2–3	3–0	0–0	2–0		1–2	2–0
Sporting Cristal	0–0	2–0	2–0	1–2	0–0	0–0	2–1	1–2	4–0	2–0	2–0	1–1		2–1
Universitario	7–0	2–0	2–2	6–2	4–1	0–0	2–1	7–3	2–0	3–1	3–1	1–0	1–0	

Updated to match(es) played on 1966. Source: Diario El Comercio, La Prensa and Crónica.
Legend: Blue = home team win; Yellow = draw; Red = away team win.

== Top scorers ==
Rank	Player	Club	Goals
1	(Peru) Teófilo Cubillas	Alianza Lima	19
2	(Peru) Ricardo López Lavalle	Defensor Lima	14
2	(Peru) Ángel Uribe	Universitario	14

== See also ==
- 1966 Peruvian Segunda División
- 1967 Copa Perú
