= Estadio Melgar =

Stadium in Peru

Coordinates: 16.4088034°S 71.5350241°W

- "Estadio de Cuarto Centenario"
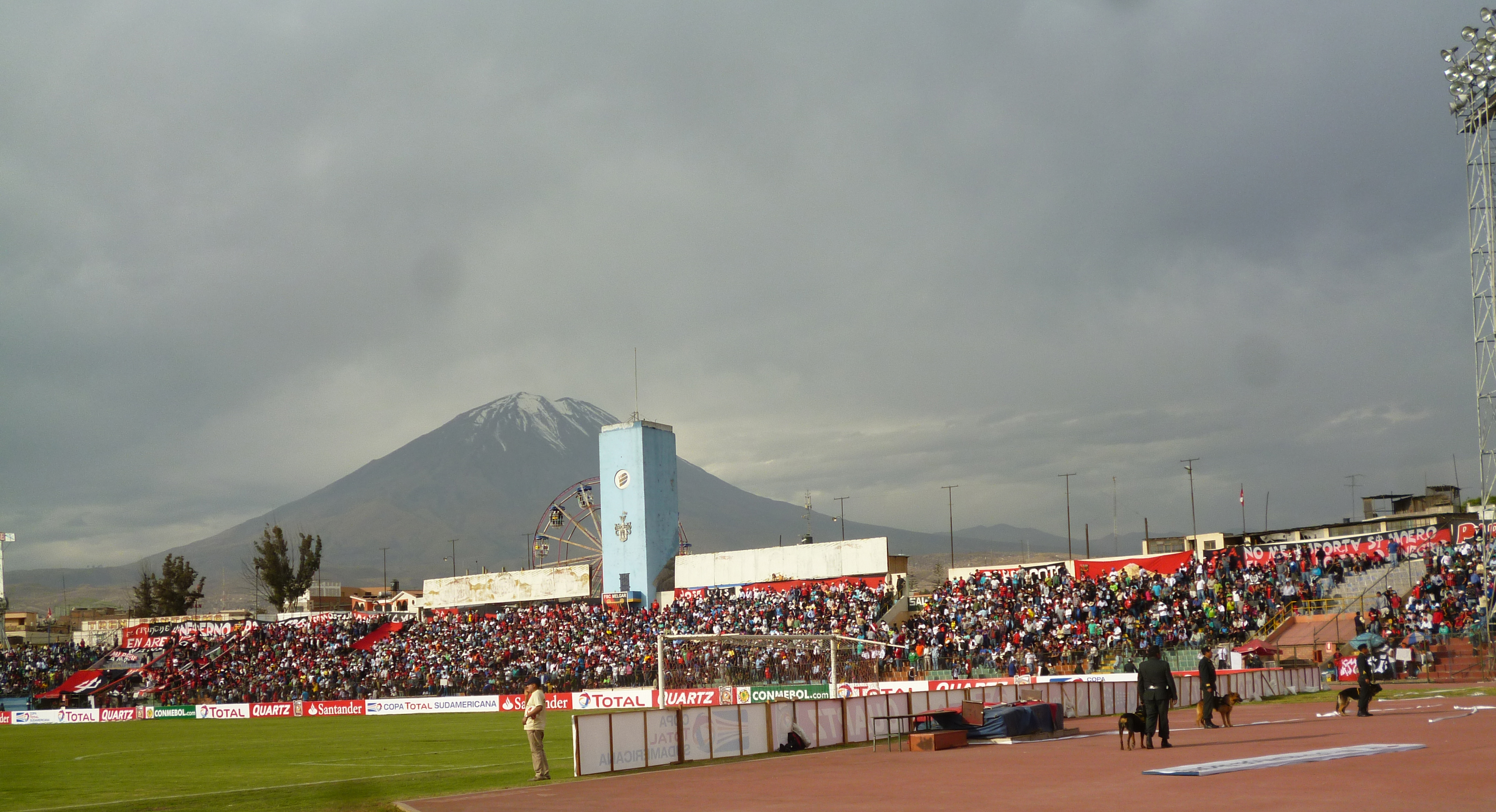
- Estadio Mariano Melgar
- Interactive map of Estadio Melgar
- Full name: Estadio Melgar
- Location: Arequipa, Peru
- Owner: Instituto Peruano del Deporte
- Operator: Instituto Peruano del Deporte
- Capacity: 15,000
- Surface: Grass

Construction
- Built: 1954
- Opened: 1954
- Renovated: 2001
- Expanded: 2001

Tenants
- FBC Melgar; Total Clean; Senati FBC; Sportivo Huracán; FBC White Star

The Estadio Melgar is a multi-use stadium in Arequipa, Peru. Its primary use is to host football games for Peruvian First Division team FBC Melgar and Peruvian Segunda Division team Sportivo Huracán and Copa Perú teams Senati FBC, FBC Aurora and FBC White Star. The stadium has a seating capacity of 15,000 and includes a running track for track and field events. It was named after Mariano Melgar, a Peruvian patriot and poet from Arequipa. It is also known as "Estadio de Cuarto Centenario" (Fourth Centennial Stadium) since it is in a neighborhood which was built in celebration of the fourth centennial of the Spanish foundation of Arequipa. The stadium was a venue for the 2001 South American U-17 Championship in Peru.

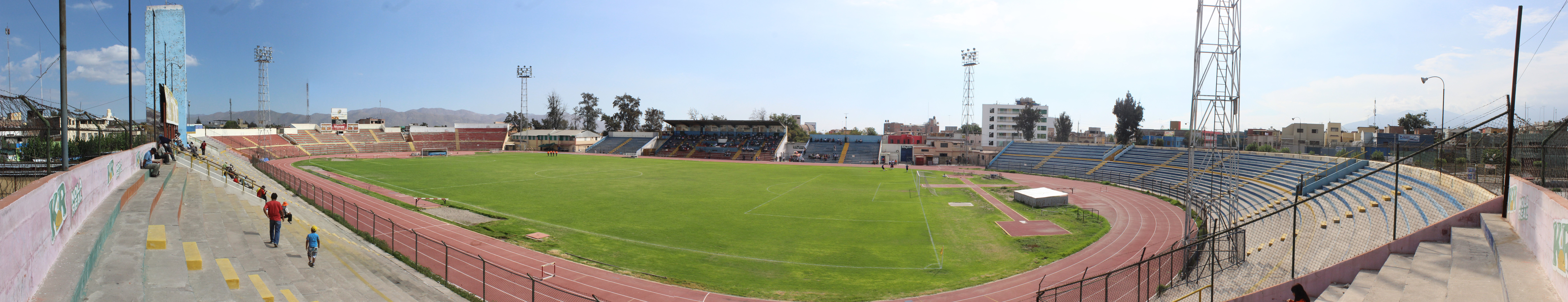
