= FBC Melgar =

Association football club in Peru

- Full name: Foot Ball Club Melgar
- Nicknames: El Dominó; El León del Sur; Sangre y Luto; Los Rojinegros; Characatos; Mistianos
- Founded: March 25, 1915; 111 years ago
- Stadium: Estadio Monumental Virgen de Chapi
- Capacity: 40,370
- Chairman: Ricardo Bettocchi
- Manager: Miguel Rondelli
- League: Liga 1
- 2025: Liga 1, 6th of 19
- Website: fbcmelgar.com.pe
Home colours	Away colours	Third colours

The Foot Ball Club Melgar, also known as FBC Melgar or Melgar, is a Peruvian professional football club based in Arequipa. It is one of Peru's oldest football teams, founded 25 March 1915 under the name Juventud Melgar by a group of football enthusiasts from Arequipa. The club currently competes in the Peruvian Primera División, the top tier of Peruvian football.

The team first participated in the Peruvian football league in 1919 and later was invited to the first true National football league, the Torneo Descentralizado, in 1966, when four teams from the Provinces were invited to join the league. Previously, only teams from Lima and Callao had been allowed to compete for the championship. Due to a low finish the first year, Melgar was dropped from the league after the first year. After winning the Copa Perú they returned to the Primera División where they have remained to this day. Melgar won the Primera División for the first time in 1981 and 2015.

FBC Melgar has had a long-standing rivalry with Cienciano of Cusco, known as the Clásico del Sur. The rivalry is one of the oldest in Peru. Melgar also has rivalries with FBC Aurora, Sportivo Huracán and FBC Piérola.

The club began playing its home games at the Estadio Mariano Melgar, but moved to the Estadio Monumental Virgen de Chapi when it was built in 1990, with a capacity of 40,370. Along with a men's team, Melgar also has a women's football team that participates in the Liga Femenina.

== History ==
=== Beginnings (1915–1939) ===
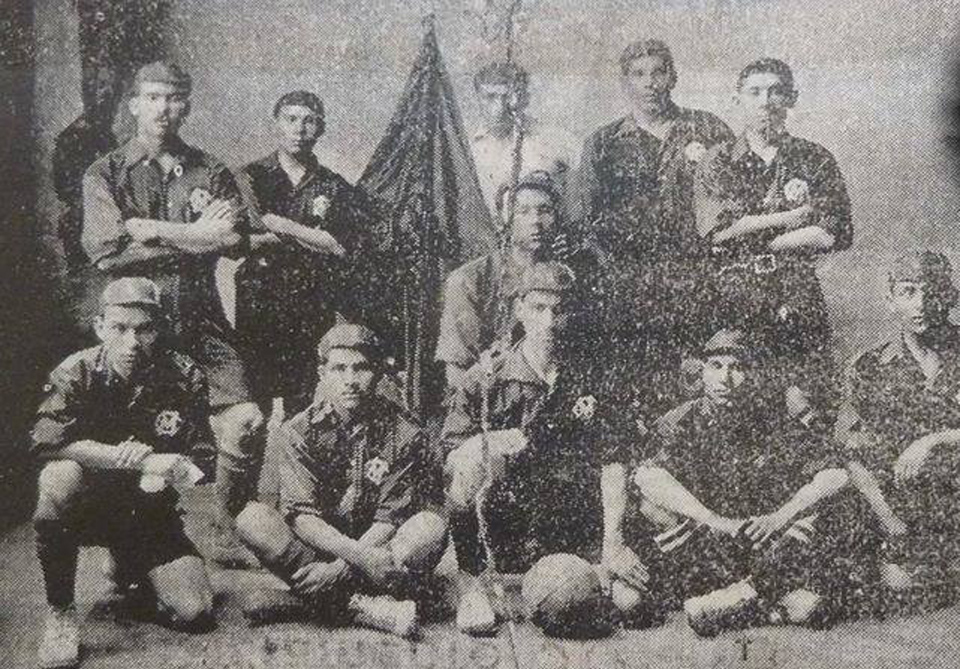
Squad of then Juventud Melgar in 1915.

FBC Melgar was founded on 25 March 1915 as Juventud Melgar by a group of young football fans in Arequipa. The name was chosen in honor of the poet Mariano Melgar. The club would take part in their first championship in 1918, the Liga Provincial de Arequipa. In 1919, the club traveled to Lima to participate in friendlies where their performance was widespread across the city. Melgar won their first title in the 1921 Liga Distrital de Arequipa, defeating Independencia. They would win the championship again in 1923, 1925 and 1926. They later would be champions of Arequipa in 1928.

In 1930, Melgar would begin a tour across Chile, being their first international appearance. Their debut would be against Valparaíso which resulted in a draw. They would later meet again which resulted in a 5–0 loss. Melgar would later play against clubs such as Colo-Colo, Audax Italiano, Coquimbo Unido, and Antofagasta. A year later, the Bolivian club Club Bolívar would visit Arequipa to play matches with the local clubs and clubs of nearby Mollendo. Melgar faced Bolivar and won for the first time against a foreign club. The win resulted in a rivalry between the two clubs. In the same decade, changes were made to the football of Arequipa, some of which reduced the number of teams participating in the Primera Division and relegations. Melgar suffered from these reforms, not winning any titles and were relegated to the Segunda Division of Arequipa. They missed promotion in 1933 to Deportivo Ciclón. In the same years, Melgar sparked a rivalry with another club in Arequipa known as FBC Aurora. In 1939, Melgar got promoted back to the first division but did not win any titles.

=== The Lost Years (1940–1956) ===
In the 1939 Second Category tournament, Melgar knew how to impose itself on all its rivals by drawing only one game, in this way, the red-and-blacks earned the right to play again the promotion match that should have taken place at the end of that year against Deportivo Ciclón that occupied the last place in the first division; however, the match would be played a year later, at the end of 1940, as the old Melgar Stadium was demolished and the new Melgar Stadium would only be inaugurated for the IV Centennial festivities in October. It was in that scenario where the match was played, Melgar's first at the IV Centenario neighborhood Stadium, and culminated with a victory by the minimum of the red-and-blacks who took revenge against the San Lázaro team and returned to the top flight. The permanence in the First Division would not last long as they would be relegated again after finishing last in the 1941 tournaments, falling by the minimum in the promotion match against Deportivo Mistiano. In 1944, still in the Second Division, they finished second in their series when they were defeated by Deportivo Juvenil Arequipa, preventing them from reaching the final and therefore the possibility of accessing the First Division again.

In 1945, the red-and-black team would win the Second Division championship comfortably, accessing the First Division directly. In 1946 and 1947, already in the First Division of the Provincial League of Arequipa, the red-and-black club had outstanding performances reaching fourth place in the table in both seasons, in addition the club was again able to play matches against capital teams such as Sport Boys and Ciclista Association, and international ones such as the one that beat the Litoral de Bolivia by the score of 4 to 2.

=== First successes (1957–1981) ===
After staying several years in the second division of the city since they were relegated on 4 August 1957 in a match against Independiente de Miraflores, FBC Melgar would be promoted to the first division after winning the tournament of the year 1961 (played from November to that year until July 1962) by finishing first with 22 points undefeated by winning 9 games and drawing another 4, being above other classic teams such as Deportivo Mistiano and Victoria del Huayco. Their good run through the tournament began with a victory over San Cristóbal by 3 to 1, achieving promotion by defeating Deportivo Bolivariano by 5 to 1. In that match, Carlos Paredes scored at 8 minutes of the first half, the opponent tied at 12 minutes, then the rout began with goals from Óscar Márquez at 20 minutes and then Walter Zúñiga at 25 minutes increased on the scoreboard and in the final stage Carlos Márquez scored in the 7th and 27th minutes of the second half decreeing the 5–1 victory.

Melgar would go on to win the Liga Distrital de Arequipa in 1962, 1964, 1965, 1967, 1968, 1969 and 1970. They were also champions of the Liga Departamental de Arequipa for 3 consecutive years since 1967 and won the Copa Perú in 1971. This championship allowed them to return to the First Division Campeonato Descentralizado where they currently remain.

Melgar won the National Championship in 1981 for the first time, and Melgar was the runner-up of the national championship in 1983. They would beat giants such as Alianza Lima, Universitario and Sporting Cristal in the final. It was the first southern team of Peru to win the national championship. In both these years this qualified them to play in the Copa Libertadores of 1982 and 1984, where they got eliminated in the Group stage in both editions.

=== Recent years (2014–present) ===
In 2014, Juan Reynoso, who came from Mexico, was appointed as the new manager. He signed players like Piero Alva, Nelinho Quina, Minzum Quina, Luis Hernández, Alejandro Hohberg, Lampros Kontogiannis and Edgar Villamarín to make an impressive campaign where Melgar was the best team during the whole season finishing 1st in the accumulated table, but due to some bad results in the final matches and the poor organization of the tournament they weren't able to dispute the Play-off for the championship and only qualified for the Copa Sudamericana, where there was an intense match with Deportivo Pasto, winning by four goals in the first game, but lost by five in the second, being eliminated in the qualifying round.

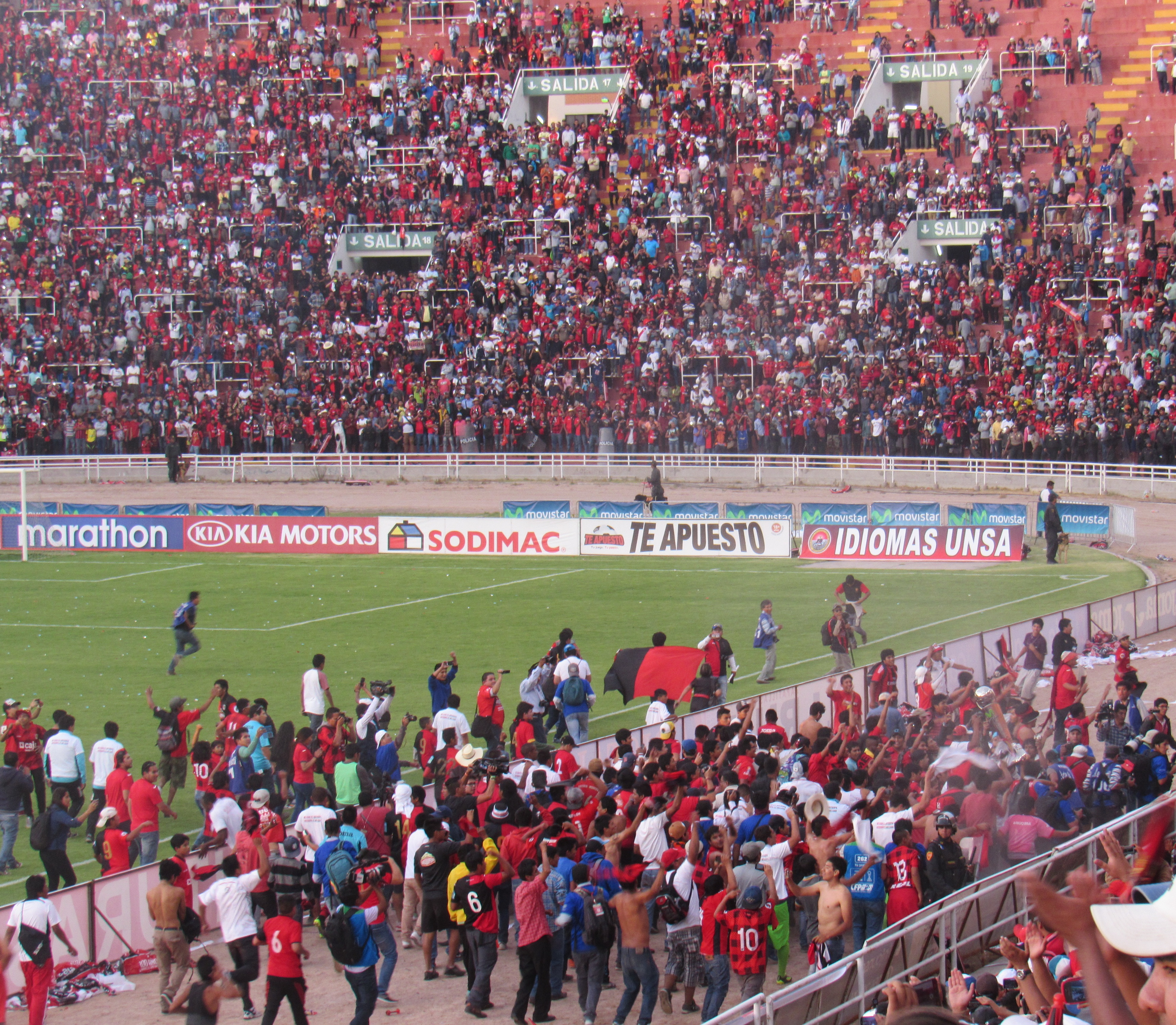
Melgar celebrating its second title in 2015.

In 2015, the year of Melgar's centenary, and still with Reynoso as the manager, the team signed important players like Raúl Ruidíaz, Carlos Ascues, Johnnier Montaño, Rainer Torres and Daniel Ferreyra to make an impressive team and fight for the title. Then, Melgar won the national championship, besting Sporting Cristal with a score in the final minute by Bernardo Cuesta. As a result, they classified for the 2016 Copa Libertadores, and again in 2017, 2018, and 2019. In ally editions, they were eliminated in the second stage. Melgar classified for the 2022 Copa Sudamericana, which would be their best performance in an international competition. They were able to qualify for the Group stage after defeating rivals Cienciano in the qualifying round. They topped their group and went on to the Round of 16 and Quarter-finals, defeating large South american clubs such as Deportivo Cali of Colombia and SC Internacional of Brazil. They were then eliminated in the Semi-finals by Independiente del Valle of Ecuador.

In the 2022 season, Melgar won the Torneo Apertura, classifying for the semi-finals, defeating Sporting Cristal and advancing to the final. They would meet Alianza Lima in the final, winning 1–0 at home but lost 2–0 away and lost the final. They would classify for the 2023 Copa Libertadores as a result and got eliminated in the Group stage. Melgar would again classify for the 2024 Copa Libertadores but were eliminated by debuting club Aurora from Bolivia, (not to be confused with Melgar rivals FBC Aurora) losing 2–1 on aggregate.

== Stadium ==
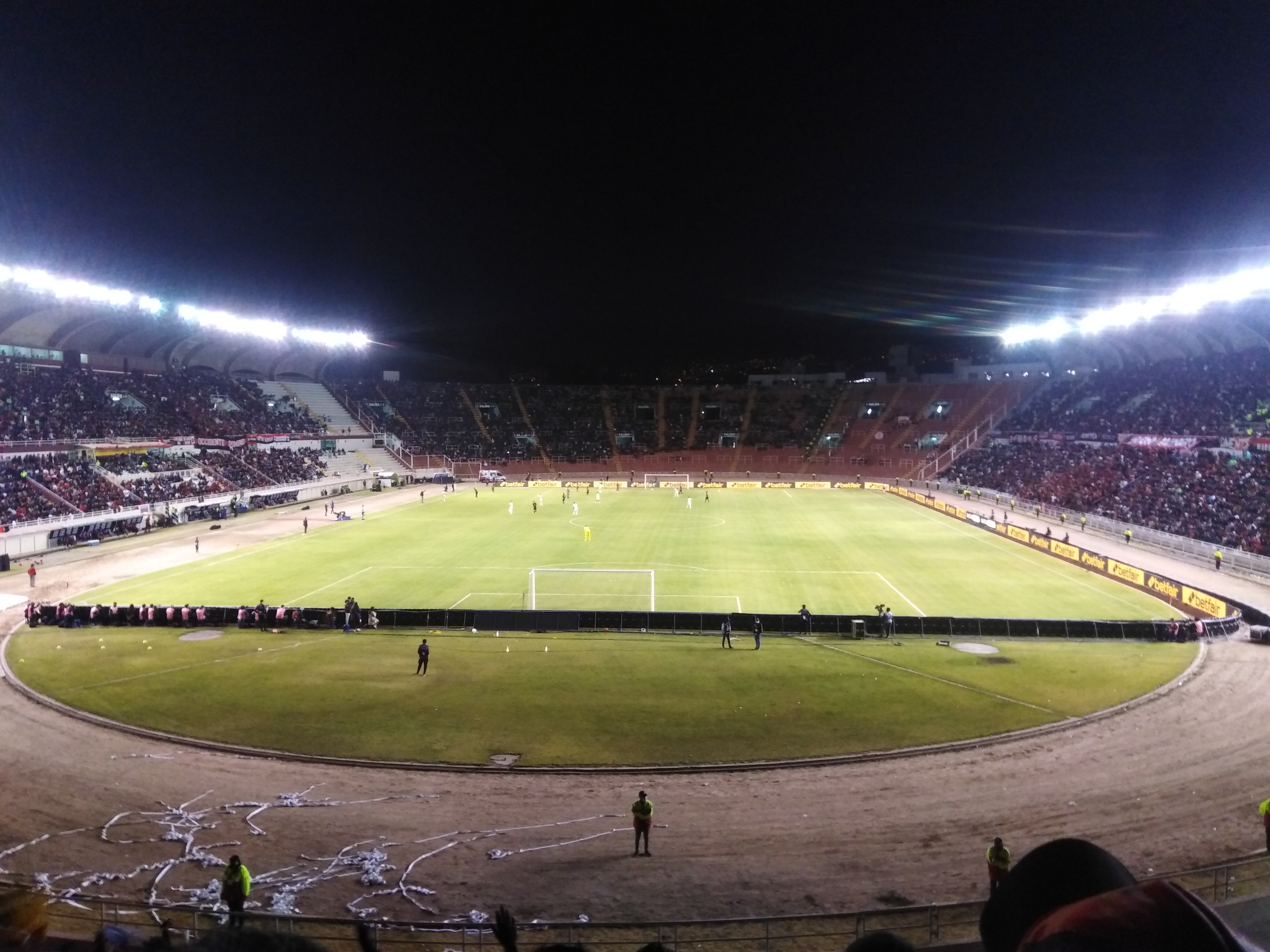
Melgar at the Estadio Virgen de Chapi in a match against SC Internacional

Melgar plays most of their home games at Estadio Monumental Virgen de Chapi, also known as Estadio Monumental de la UNSA, or simply Estadio de la UNSA, but also plays at their second stadium, Estadio Mariano Melgar. Its construction began in 1991 and has a capacity of 40,370, making it the fourth largest stadium in Peru. The stadium has hosted many tournaments, such as the 2004 Copa América, and the second leg of the 2003 Copa Sudamericana final, where Cienciano, another Peruvian club, won the tournament. Cienciano played at the stadium until their own Estadio Garcilaso was renovated. It was also going to be a venue for the 2019 FIFA U-17 World Cup where Peru was initially hosts. The Peru national football team occasionally plays at the stadium.

Estadio Mariano Melgar, also known as Estadio de Cuarto Centenario, was Melgars first stadium and was built in 1954. The stadium is named after Mariano Melgar, a Peruvian poet and patriot. It has a capacity of 15,000 and is home to various clubs in Arequipa along with Melgar. It hosted the 2001 South American U-17 Championship where it was held in Arequipa. The stadium, along with Estadio Virgen de Chapi also has a running track for track and field events.

In 2024, Melgar inaugurated its own training ground, call the Centro de Alto Rendimiento – Melgar.

== Supporters ==
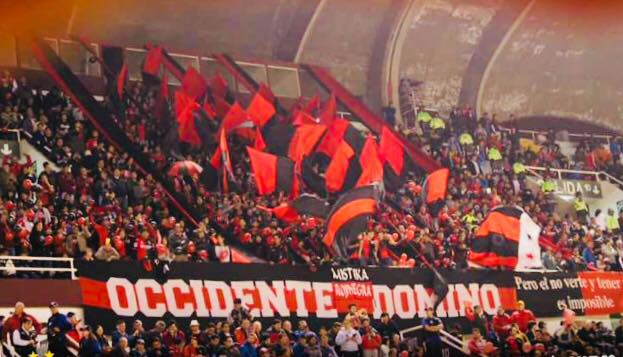
Occidente Domino

Melgar is the largest and most popular team in Arequipa. Among all the other teams in Peru, Melgar is ranked fifth in strongest fanbase of the Peruvian Primera División along with rivals Cienciano of Cusco, in 2020. In 2017, the team was ranked number one in all of Peru, surpassing giants Alianza Lima and Universitario through digital fanbase. To find out the information, researchers found out and used the Cyber Hinchada 2017 and conducted a survey, where there are three factors that determine a teams fanbase, that being the number of likes, comments and posts, percentage of growth in followers, and the total number of followers, having a weight of 50%, 30% and 20% respectively. This was mostly contributed by Melgars second place in the 2017 season and win in 2015. Currently, the team is ranked fourth in terms of the largest fan base in 2023, after Alianza Lima, Universitario, and Sporting Cristal.

The team is nicknamed El Dominó, ''The Domino'', which came from the teams iconic red and black shirts. Occidente Domino is the largest fan group of Melgar and is located on the Occidente stand of the stadium.

== Rivalries ==
Melgar has an intense long-standing rivalry with Cienciano of Cusco, known as the Clásico del Sur. Both are the clubs with the largest number of fans outside of Lima nationwide. This traditional meeting is known as El Clásico del Sur. The first official duel took place on date 3 of the final hexagonal of the 1967 Copa Perú, where Melgar won 2–1 in Lima. They have faced each other 139 times to date, with Melgar being the biggest winner with 66 duels won against the Cusco team's 39. In 2022 they met for the first time in international tournaments, specifically in the preliminary round of the Copa Sudamericana, where Melgar would win 2–1 on aggregate. In addition, Melgar is the one who delivered the biggest win between them, being a 7–0 in the South zone of Regional I of the 1990 Torneo Descentralizado.

Melgar also has had a long-standing rivalry with FBC Aurora, Sportivo Huracán, and FBC Piérola, called the Superclásico Arequipeño. The rivalries are with the other clubs in Arequipa, and date back to the early 1900s when the clubs were playing in the Liga Departamental de Arequipa and Primera Division. FBC Melgar currently does not play with these clubs as they are in separate leagues.

== Current squad ==
As of 24 September 2026

Note: Flags indicate national team as defined under FIFA eligibility rules; some limited exceptions apply. Players may hold more than one non-FIFA nationality.

No.	Pos.	Nation	Player
1	GK	PER	Ricardo Farro
3	DF	ARG	Leonel González
5	DF	PER	Alec Deneumostier
7	FW	ARG	Cristian Bordacahar
8	FW	ARG	Lautaro Guzmán (on loan from Arsenal Sarandí)
9	FW	ARG	Bernardo Cuesta (captain)
10	MF	URU	Nicolás Quagliata
11	FW	PER	Jhonny Vidales
12	GK	PER	Carlos Cáceda
16	MF	PER	Jefferson Cáceres
20	MF	PER	Gian García
21	GK	PER	Jorge Cabezudo
24	MF	PER	Walter Tandazo
25	MF	ECU	Kevin Minda (on loan from LDU Quito)

No.	Pos.	Nation	Player
26	MF	ARG	Marcos Portillo (on loan from Talleres)
27	DF	PER	Nelson Cabanillas
31	GK	PER	Facundo de la Cruz
33	DF	PER	Matías Lazo
36	FW	PER	Patricio Núñez
38	DF	PER	Ángel Obando
40	FW	PER	Ryu Yabiku
42	MF	PER	Ian Arróspide
44	MF	PER	Keith Yáñez
45	FW	PER	Matías Zegarra
66	MF	ARG	Horacio Orzán
77	FW	PER	Franco Zanelatto
80	FW	PER	Jhamir D'Arrigo
90	DF	MEX	Jesús Alcántar (on loan from Necaxa)

=== Out on loan ===
Note: Flags indicate national team as defined under FIFA eligibility rules; some limited exceptions apply. Players may hold more than one non-FIFA nationality.

No.	Pos.	Nation	Player
11	FW	PER	Bruno Portugal (at Carlos A. Mannucci until 31 December 2026)
13	DF	PER	Mathías Llontop (at Sport Boys until 31 December 2026)
19	FW	ARG	Gregorio Rodríguez (at San Lorenzo until 31 December 2026)

No.	Pos.	Nation	Player
25	FW	PER	Mariano Barreda (at Alianza Atlético until 31 December 2026)
31	GK	PER	Octavio Ramos (at Llacuabamba until 31 December 2026)
77	DF	PLE	Emilio Saba (at Sport Boys until 31 December 2026)

== Honours ==
=== Senior titles ===
Keys

- Record
- ^{(s)} Shared record

Type	Competition	Titles	Runner-up	Winning years	Runner-up years
National (League)	Liga 1	2	3	1981, 2015	1983, 2016, 2022
National (League)	Intermedia (1984–1987)	1	—	1987 Zona Sur	—
National (League)	Copa Perú	1	2	1971	1969, 1970
Half-year / Short tournament (League)	Torneo Apertura	1	2	2022	2014, 2015
Half-year / Short tournament (League)	Torneo Clausura	2	1	2015, 2018	2023
Half-year / Short tournament (League)	Torneo de Verano	1^{(s)}	—	2017	—
Half-year / Short tournament (League)	Torneo Zona Sur	6	3	1984, 1986, 1990–I, 1990–II, 1991–I, 1991–II	1985, 1988, 1989–I
National (Cups)	Copa Presidente de la República	—	1	—	1970
Regional (League)	Región Sur	5	—	1967, 1968, 1969, 1970, 1971	—
Regional (League)	Liga Departamental de Arequipa	4	—	1967, 1968, 1969, 1970	—
Regional (League)	Liga Provincial de Arequipa	12	8	1921–II, 1923–II, 1925–I, 1926–II, 1928, 1962, 1964, 1965, 1967, 1968, 1969, 1970	1923–I, 1925–III, 1927, 1929–I, 1929–III, 1931–I, 1936, 1953
Regional (League)	Segunda Provincial de Arequipa	3	—	1939, 1945, 1961	—

=== Friendlies ===
Type	Competition	Titles	Runner-up	Winning years	Runner-up years
International (Cup)	Copa El Gráfico-Perú	1	—	2001–III	—

=== Youth ===
Type	Competition	Titles	Runner-up	Winning years	Runner-up years
National (League)	Torneo de Promoción y Reservas	2	1	2014, 2015	2024
Half-year / Short tournament (League)	Torneo Apertura (Reservas)	1	—	2015	—
Half-year / Short tournament (League)	Torneo Clausura (Reservas)	—	1	—	2017
Half-year / Short tournament (League)	Torneo del Inca (Reservas)	—	1	—	2015

== Other sports ==
=== Women's football ===
Along with men's football, Melgar also has a women's football team that participates in the Primera División Femenina, the top tier of Peruvian women's football. The team won the Copa Perú Femenina in 2022.

Type	Competition	Titles	Runner-up	Winning years	Runner-up years
National (League)	Copa Perú Femenina	1	—	2022	—
Regional (League)	Región VII	1	—	2022	—
Regional (League)	Liga Departamental de Arequipa	1	—	2022	—
Regional (League)	Liga Provincial de Arequipa	—	1	—	2022
Regional (League)	Liga Distrital de Cayma	1	—	2022	—

==== Youth ====
Type	Competition	Titles	Runner-up	Winning years	Runner-up years
National (League)	CONMEBOL Torneo Nacional Juvenil Femenino Sub-14	—	1	—	2024

== Performance in CONMEBOL competitions ==
- Copa Libertadores: 9 appearances

1982: Group Stage
1984: Group Stage
2016: Group Stage
2017: Group Stage
2018: Second Stage
2019: Group Stage
2023: Group Stage
2024: First Stage
2025: Third Stage

- Copa Sudamericana: 8 appearances

2013: First Stage
2015: First Stage
2019: Second Stage
2020: Second Stage
2021: Group Stage
2022: Semifinals
2025: Group Stage
2026: Group Stage

- Copa CONMEBOL: 1 appearance

1998: Round 1

- U-20 Copa Libertadores: 1 appearances

2016: Group Stage

=== Standings ===
Competition	A	P	W	D	L	GF	GA	DG	Pts
Copa Libertadores	9	48	13	5	30	43	80	−37	44
Copa Sudamericana	7	38	17	7	14	40	52	−12	58
Copa CONMEBOL	1	2	0	0	2	2	6	−4	0

A = appearances, P = matches played, W = won, D = drawn, L = lost, GF = goals for, GA = goals against, DG = difference goals, Pts = points.

Season	Competition	Round	Club	Home	Away	Aggregate
1982	Copa Libertadores	Group stage	(Peru) Deportivo Municipal	2–1	2–0	Second place
1982	Copa Libertadores	Group stage	(Paraguay) Olimpia	0–3	0–4	Second place
1982	Copa Libertadores	Group stage	(Paraguay) Sol de América	3–2	2–0	Second place
1984	Copa Libertadores	Group stage	(Peru) Sporting Cristal	2–0	2–3	Fourth place
1984	Copa Libertadores	Group stage	(Venezuela) Universidad de Los Andes	0–1	0–1	Fourth place
1984	Copa Libertadores	Group stage	(Venezuela) Portuguesa	1–2	0–4	Fourth place
1998	Copa CONMEBOL	R1	(Ecuador) LDU Quito	1–3	1–3	2–6
2013	Copa Sudamericana	Q1	(Colombia) Deportivo Pasto	2–0	0–3	2–3
2015	Copa Sudamericana	Q1	(Colombia) Junior	4–0	0–5	4–5
2016	Copa Libertadores	Group stage	(Brazil) Atlético Mineiro	1–2	0–4	Fourth place
2016	Copa Libertadores	Group stage	(Ecuador) Independiente del Valle	0–1	0–2	Fourth place
2016	Copa Libertadores	Group stage	(Chile) Colo-Colo	1–2	0–1	Fourth place
2017	Copa Libertadores	Group stage	(Ecuador) Emelec	1–0	0–3	Fourth place
2017	Copa Libertadores	Group stage	(Colombia) Independiente Medellín	1–2	0–2	Fourth place
2017	Copa Libertadores	Group stage	(Argentina) River Plate	2–3	2–4	Fourth place
2018	Copa Libertadores	Second Stage	(Chile) Santiago Wanderers	0–1	1–1	1–2
2019	Copa Libertadores	Second Stage	Universidad de Chile	1–0	0–0	1–0
2019	Copa Libertadores	Third Stage	(Venezuela) Caracas	2–0	1–2	3–2
2019	Copa Libertadores	Group stage	(Argentina) San Lorenzo	0–0	0–2	Third place
2019	Copa Libertadores	Group stage	(Colombia) Junior	1–0	1–0	Third place
2019	Copa Libertadores	Group stage	(Brazil) Palmeiras	0–4	0–3	Third place
2019	Copa Sudamericana	Q2	(Ecuador) Universidad Católica	0–0	0–6	0–6
2020	Copa Sudamericana	Q1	(Bolivia) Nacional Potosí	0–2	2–0	2–2 (4–3 p)
2020	Copa Sudamericana	Q2	(Brazil) Bahia	1–0	0–4	1–4
2021	Copa Sudamericana	Q1	(Peru) Carlos A. Mannucci	3–2	2–1	5–3
2021	Copa Sudamericana	Group stage	(Venezuela) Metropolitanos	0–0	3–2	Second place
2021	Copa Sudamericana	Group stage	(Ecuador) Aucas	2–0	1–2	Second place
2021	Copa Sudamericana	Group stage	(Brazil) Athletico Paranaense	1–0	0–1	Second place
2022	Copa Sudamericana	Q1	(Peru) Cienciano	1–0	1–1	2–1
2022	Copa Sudamericana	Group stage	(Brazil) Cuiabá	3–1	0–2	First place
2022	Copa Sudamericana	Group stage	(Uruguay) River Plate UY	2–0	2–1	First place
2022	Copa Sudamericana	Group stage	(Argentina) Racing Club	3–1	0–1	First place
2022	Copa Sudamericana	Round 16	(Colombia) Deportivo Cali	2–1	0–0	2–1
2022	Copa Sudamericana	Quarter-finals	(Brazil) Internacional	0–0	0–0 (3–1 p)	0–0(3–1 p)
2022	Copa Sudamericana	Semi-finals	(Ecuador) Independiente del Valle	0–3	0–3	0–6
2023	Copa Libertadores	Group stage	(Paraguay) Olimpia	1–1	1–4	Fourth place
2023	Copa Libertadores	Group stage	(Colombia) Atlético Nacional	0–1	1–3	Fourth place
2023	Copa Libertadores	Group stage	(Argentina) Patronato	5–0	1–4	Fourth place
2024	Copa Libertadores	First Stage	(Bolivia) Aurora	1–1	0–1	1–2
2025	Copa Libertadores	Second Stage	(Colombia) Deportes Tolima	1–0	1–0	2–0
2025	Copa Libertadores	Third Stage	(Paraguay) Cerro Porteño	0–1	2–4	2–5
2025	Copa Sudamericana	Group Stage	(Brazil) Vasco da Gama	3–3	0–3	Third place
2025	Copa Sudamericana	Group Stage	(Argentina) Lanús	0–1	0–3	Third place
2025	Copa Sudamericana	Group Stage	(Venezuela) Puerto Cabello	1–0	1–0	Third place

== Notable players ==
- (Argentina) Bernardo Cuesta
- (Colombia) Omar Fernández
- (Paraguay) Gustavo Bobadilla
- (Peru) Eduardo Márquez
- (Peru) Armando Palacios
- (Peru) Genaro Neyra
- (Peru) Ernesto Neyra
- (Peru) Raúl Obando
- (Argentina) Horacio Orzán
- (Peru) Walter Zevallos
- (Peru) Ysrael Zúñiga

== Historical list of coaches ==
- (Peru) Fernando Cuéllar (1997)
- (Peru) Freddy Ternero (1998)
- (Peru) Roberto Mosquera (2004–05)
- (Peru) Teddy Cardama (1 January 2006 – 31 December 2006)
- (Peru) Rafael Castillo (2006–07)
- (Paraguay) Gustavo Bobadilla (1 January 2008 – 24 September 2008)
- (Uruguay) Claudio Techera (26 August 2008 – 30 August 2009)
- (Peru) Ernesto Vera (1 August 2009 – 31 December 2009)
- (Chile) Luis Flores (1 September 2009 – 20 February 2010)
- (Uruguay) Carlos Manta (5 January 2010 – 26 May 2010)
- (Uruguay) Carlos Jurado (31 May 2010 – 10 December 2010)
- (Uruguay) Claudio Techera (1 January 2011 – 16 May 2011)
- (Peru) Wilmar Valencia (2 May 2011 – 10 January 2012)
- (Argentina) Julio Alberto Zamora (13 December 2011 – 31 December 2012)
- (Argentina) Fabián Marcelo Straccia (1 January 2013 – 11 March 2013)
- (Peru) Ricardo Medina (interim) (12 March 2013 – 31 March 2013)
- (Peru) Franco Navarro (1 April 2013 – 7 September 2013)
- (Peru) Juan Reynoso (8 January 2014 – 1 October 2017)
- (Mexico) Enrique Maximiliano Meza (5 October 2017 – 30 April 2018)
- (Colombia) Hernán Torres (24 May 2018 – 11 December 2018)
- (Argentina) Jorge Pautasso(26 December 2018 – 21 May 2019)
- (Argentina) Diego Osella(14 June 2019 – 27 October 2019)
- (Argentina) Carlos Bustos(2 December 2019 – 24 September 2020)
- (Argentina) Néstor Lorenzo(16 December 2020 – 7 July 2022)
- (Argentina) Pablo Lavallén(3 July 2022 – 6 March 2023)
- (Argentina) Mariano Soso (14 March 2023 – 21 November 2023)
- (Argentina) Pablo de Muner (6 December 2023 – )

== See also ==
- Arequipa
- Mariano Melgar
- List of Peruvian Stadiums
- Peru national football team
