= 1973 Club Universitario de Deportes season =

Universitario de Deportes
1973 season
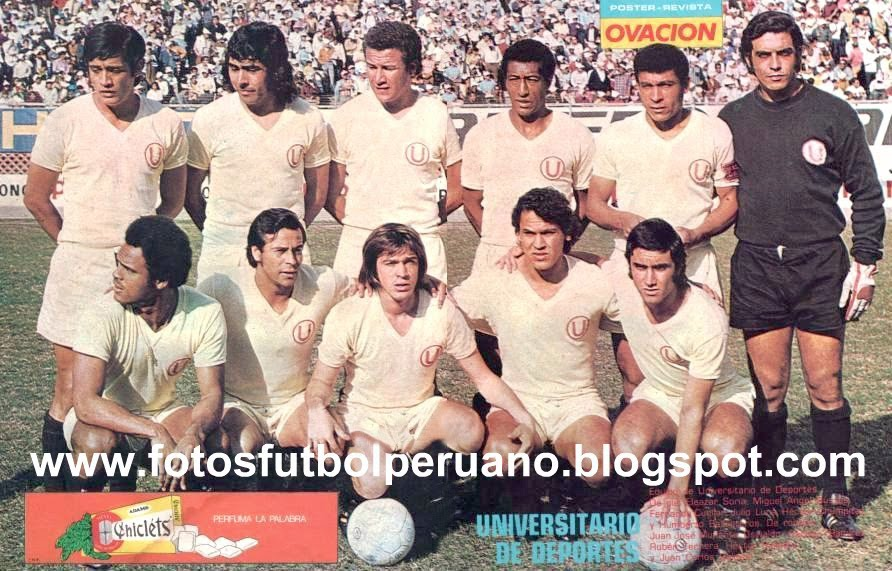
- Chairman: Rafael Quirós
- Manager: (Peru) Roberto Reinoso (Uruguay) Roberto Scarone
- Stadium: Teodoro Lolo Fernández
- Torneo Descentralizado: Runners-up
- Copa Libertadores: Group stage
- Top goalscorer: League: Héctor Bailetti (17); All: Héctor Bailetti (17)
- Biggest win: 6–0: vs León de Huánuco
Home colours

Club Universitario de Deportes 1973 season was the club's 49th year of existence, the 106th year in professional football and the 51th in the top level of professional football in Peru.

== Squad ==
No.	Pos.	Nation	Player
—	GK	ARG	Humberto Horacio Ballesteros
—	GK	PER	Ricardo Valderrama
—	DF	PER	Carlos Carbonell
—	DF	PER	Eleazar Soria
—	DF	PER	Julio Luna Portal
—	DF	PER	Fernando Cuéllar
—	DF	PER	Héctor Chumpitaz
—	DF	PER	Juan Manuel Toyco
—	DF	PER	Eduardo Wolf
—	MF	PER	Fernando Alva
—	MF	PER	Santiago Gastulo
—	MF	ARG	Miguel Ángel Bustos

No.	Pos.	Nation	Player
—	MF	PER	Hernán Castañeda
—	MF	PER	Luis Cruzado
—	MF	URU	Rubén Techera
—	MF	PER	Ángel Uribe
—	FW	PER	Pedro Aicart
—	FW	PER	Héctor Bailetti
—	FW	PER	Víctor Calatayud
—	FW	PER	Juan José Muñante
—	FW	PER	Juan Carlos Oblitas
—	FW	PER	Oswaldo Ramírez
—	FW	PER	Percy Rojas
—	FW	PER	Percy Vílchez

== Match Results ==
=== Torneo Descentralizado ===
14 April 1973 1	José Gálvez	1–3	Universitario de Deportes	Manuel Gómez Arellano, Chimbote
	Mazzo 19'	Report	Castañeda 33'; Bustos 45'; Bailetti 82'

23 April 1973 2	Universitario de Deportes	6–1	CNI de Iquitos	Teodoro Lolo Fernández, Lima
	Bustos 5'; Bailetti 54', 70', 80', 87'; Carbonell 67'	Report	Vidarte 15'

28 April 1973 3	Universitario de Deportes	6–0	León de Huánuco	Teodoro Lolo Fernández, Lima
	Aicart 5'; Bailetti 19', 35'; Calatayud 41'; Bustos 75'; Gastulo 85'	Report

6 May 1973 4	Universitario de Deportes	2–0	Cienciano	Teodoro Lolo Fernández, Lima
	Calatayud 41'; Bustos 75'	Report

6 May 1973 5	Universitario de Deportes	0–2	Melgar	Teodoro Lolo Fernández, Lima
		Report	Solís 16'; Bastida 70'

18 May 1973 6	Universitario de Deportes	2–1	Juan Aurich	Teodoro Lolo Fernández, Lima
	Castañeda 26'; Bailetti 30'	Report	Lobatón 32'

26 May 1973 7	Defensor Lima	0–3	Universitario de Deportes	Estadio Nacional, Lima
		Report	Bustos 5'; Bailetti 7'; Vílchez 45'

3 June 1973 8	Universitario de Deportes	3–0	Sport Boys	Estadio Nacional, Lima
		Report	Ramírez 56', 64'; Bailetti 85'	Attendance: 32,402

10 June 1973 8	Alianza Lima	2–3	Universitario de Deportes	Alejandro Villanueva, Lima
	Rivero 9', 30'	Report	Bailetti 62'; Carbonell 73', 88'	Attendance: 32,402

17 June 1973 9	Universitario de Deportes	1–0	Deportivo SIMA	Teodoro Lolo Fernández, Lima
	Techera 59'	Report

29 June 1973 10	Club Atlético Grau	0–0	Universitario de Deportes	Miguel Grau, Piura
		Report

8 July 1973 11	Club Atlético Torino	1–1	Universitario de Deportes	Campeonísimo, Talara
	Vargas 11'	Report	Techera 59'

15 July 1973 12	Sportivo Huracán	3–1	Universitario de Deportes	Melgar, Arequipa
	Neyra 33'; Núñez Izurriaga 40', 56'	Report	Cuéllar 87'

22 July 1973 13	Universitario de Deportes	1–2	Sporting Cristal	Teodoro Lolo Fernández, Lima
	Rojas 7'	Report	Vinha de Souza 14', 46'

8 August 1973 14	Deportivo Municipal	2–0	Universitario de Deportes	Estadio Nacional, Lima
	Risco 59'; Jiménez 70'	Report

12 August 1973 15	Universitario de Deportes	3–0	Atlético Chalaco	Teodoro Lolo Fernández, Lima
	Oswaldo Ramírez 42', 60', 65'	Report

17 August 1973 16	Universitario de Deportes	4–3	José Gálvez	Teodoro Lolo Fernández, Lima
	Bustos 21'; Techera 42'; Oblitas 43'; Carbonell 45'	Report	Portilla 28', 47', 59'

26 August 1973 17	CNI de Iquitos	1–1	Universitario de Deportes	Max Augustín, Iquitos
	Navarro 22'	Report	Ramírez 80'

2 September 1973 18	León de Huánuco	1–3	Universitario de Deportes	Heraclio Tapia, Huánuco
	Yáñez 53'	Report	Rojas 35'; Chumpitaz 44'; Bustos 87'

9 September 1973 19	Cienciano	0–1	Universitario de Deportes	Garcilaso, Cusco
		Report	Techera 70'

15 September 1973 20	Melgar	3–0	Universitario de Deportes	Melgar, Arequipa
	Solís 30'; Bastidas 41'; Ponce Arroé 81'	Report

23 September 1973 21	Juan Aurich	1–1	Universitario de Deportes	César Flores Marigorda, Lambayeque
	Arnáez 52'	Report	Chumpitaz 91'

30 September 1973 22	Universitario de Deportes	0–0	Defensor Lima	Teodoro Lolo Fernández, Lima
		Report

7 October 1973 23	Sport Boys	0–2	Universitario de Deportes	Estadio Nacional, Lima
		Report	Mexzo 23' (o.g.); Ramírez 41'

14 October 1973 24	Universitario de Deportes	1–2	Alianza Lima	Estadio Nacional, Lima
	Mayorga 58' (o.g.)	Report	Aguero 10'; Rivero Arias 35'

20 October 1973 25	Deportivo SIMA	0–2	Universitario de Deportes	Estadio Nacional, Lima
		Report	Ramírez 34', 85'

28 October 1973 26	José Pardo	1–1	Universitario de Deportes	Eugenio Zapata Mingoya, Tumán
	Catala 27'	Report	Ramírez 19'

4 November 1973 27	Universitario de Deportes	2–0	Atlético Grau	Estadio Nacional, Lima
		Report	Rojas 2'; Bailetti 19'

9 November 1973 28	Universitario de Deportes	2–0	Atlético Torino	Estadio Nacional, Lima
	Rojas 1'	Report	Montero 27'

9 November 1973 29	Universitario de Deportes	1–0	Sportivo Huracán	Estadio Nacional, Lima
	Ramírez 54'	Report

25 November 1973 30	Sporting Cristal	1–1	Universitario de Deportes	San Martín de Porres, Lima
	Vinha de Souza 45'	Report	Ramírez 39'

2 December 1973 31	Universitario de Deportes	1–1	Deportivo Municipal	Teodoro Lolo Fernández, Lima
	Ramírez 70'	Report	Mellán 10'

8 December 1973 32	Atlético Chalaco	3–0	Universitario de Deportes	Estadio Nacional, Lima
	Bustamante 51', 65'; Casaretto 88'	Report

15 December 1973 Liguilla Final 1	Universitario de Deportes	4–0	Melgar	Estadio Nacional, Lima
	Chumpitaz 2'; Bailetti 43', 59'; Ramírez 39'	Report

23 December 1973 Liguilla Final 2	Sporting Cristal	1–1	Universitario de Deportes	San Martín de Porres, Lima
	Jaime 86'	Report	Bailetti 90'

30 December 1973 Liguilla Final 3	Universitario de Deportes	1–2	Defensor Lima	Teodoro Lolo Fernández, Lima
	Bailetti 30'	Report	González 75'; Barbadillo 86'

5 January 1974 Liguilla Final 4	Alianza Lima	1–2	Universitario de Deportes	Estadio Nacional, Lima
	Ávalos 49', 56'	Report	Uribe 62'	Attendance: 40,680; Referee: José Ramírez

13 January 1974 Liguilla Final 5	Universitario de Deportes	2–1	Deportivo Municipal	Teodoro Lolo Fernández, Lima
	Ramírez 7'; Carbonell 10'	Report	Cueto 85'

== Copa Libertadores ==
=== Group Stage ===
Pos	Team	Pld	W	D	L	GF	GA	GD	Pts	Qualification	(Paraguay) CER	(Paraguay) OLI	(Peru) SCR	(Peru) UNI
1	(Paraguay) Cerro Porteño	6	4	1	1	14	5	+9	9	Semifinals	—	4–2	5–0	1–0
2	(Paraguay) Olimpia	6	3	0	3	9	9	0	6		2–1	—	1–0	3–1
3	(Peru) Sporting Cristal	6	2	2	2	5	9	−4	6		1–1	1–0	—	2–2
4	(Peru) Universitario	6	1	1	4	5	10	−5	3		0–2	2–1	0–1	—

Legend: Blue = home team win; Yellow = draw; Red = away team win.
