= 1972 Club Universitario de Deportes season =

Universitario de Deportes
1972 season
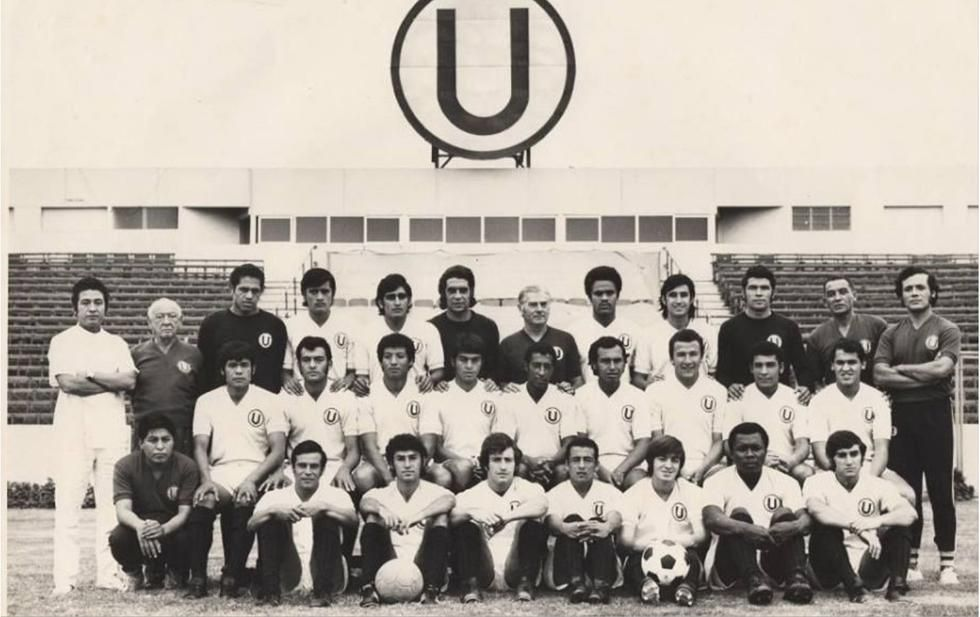
- Chairman: Rafael Quirós
- Manager: (Uruguay) Roberto Scarone
- Stadium: Teodoro Lolo Fernández
- Torneo Descentralizado: Runners-up
- Copa Libertadores: Runners-up
- Top goalscorer: League: Oswaldo Ramírez (15); All: Oswaldo Ramírez (20)
- Biggest win: 3–0: vs Nacional
Home colours

Club Universitario de Deportes 1972 season was the club's 48th year of existence, the 105th year in professional football and the 50th in the top level of professional football in Peru. This season was marked by the club being runners-up in the annual Torneo Descentralizado as well as the club being the only Peruvian club to make the finals of a Copa Libertadores as of 2026.

== Squad ==
No.	Pos.	Nation	Player
—	GK	ARG	Humberto Horacio Ballesteros
—	GK	PER	Jesús Goyzueta
—	GK	PER	Ricardo Valderrama
—	DF	PER	Carlos Carbonell
—	DF	PER	Eleazar Soria
—	DF	PER	Julio Luna Portal
—	DF	PER	Fernando Cuéllar
—	DF	PER	Héctor Chumpitaz
—	DF	PER	Félix Salinas
—	DF	PER	Guillermo Palacios
—	DF	PER	Juan Manuel Toyco
—	DF	PER	Eduardo Wolf
—	MF	PER	Fernando Alva

No.	Pos.	Nation	Player
—	MF	PER	Hernán Castañeda
—	MF	PER	Luis Cruzado
—	MF	URU	Rubén Techera
—	MF	PER	Ángel Uribe
—	FW	PER	Pedro Aicart
—	FW	PER	Héctor Bailetti
—	FW	PER	Víctor Calatayud
—	FW	PER	Juan José Muñante
—	FW	PER	Juan Carlos Oblitas
—	FW	PER	Oswaldo Ramírez
—	FW	PER	Percy Rojas
—	FW	PER	Percy Vílchez

== Torneo Descentralizado ==
=== Grupo Metropolitano ===
Pos	Team	Pld	W	D	L	GF	GA	GD	Pts	Qualification	CRI	DLI	SBA	MUN	UNI	ALI	DAR	SIM
1	Sporting Cristal	14	8	4	2	21	13	+8	20	Liguilla Final								
2	Defensor Lima	14	8	3	3	28	16	+12	19									
3	Sport Boys	14	4	7	3	28	22	+6	15									
4	Deportivo Municipal	14	5	4	5	19	18	+1	14									
5	Universitario	14	4	5	5	17	17	0	13									
6	Alianza Lima	14	5	2	7	18	28	−10	12									
7	Defensor Arica	14	2	6	6	16	25	−9	10									
8	Deportivo SIMA	14	2	5	7	16	24	−8	9									

Legend: Blue = home team win; Yellow = draw; Red = away team win.

=== Torneo Descentralizado ===
Due to the club's performance in their 1971 season, they would qualify for the 1972 Copa Libertadores.

Pos	Team	Pld	W	D	L	GF	GA	GD	Pts	Qualification or relegation
1	Alianza Lima	30	17	7	6	55	26	+29	41	Liguilla Final
2	Defensor Lima	30	16	8	6	60	35	+25	40	Liguilla Final
3	Deportivo Municipal	30	16	8	6	45	30	+15	40	Liguilla Final
4	Universitario	30	12	11	7	61	34	+27	35	Liguilla Final
5	Juan Aurich	30	15	5	10	55	44	+11	35	
6	Sporting Cristal	30	11	10	9	41	34	+7	32	
7	Atlético Grau	30	11	7	12	38	47	−9	29	
8	José Gálvez	30	8	12	10	32	34	−2	28	
9	Deportivo SIMA	30	6	16	8	33	37	−4	28	
10	Melgar	30	12	3	15	38	43	−5	27	
11	Atlético Torino	30	10	7	13	35	47	−12	27	
12	Unión Tumán	30	8	10	12	40	41	−1	26	
13	Sport Boys	30	9	8	13	38	45	−7	26	
14	León de Huánuco	30	7	12	11	33	47	−14	26	
15	Carlos A. Mannucci	30	7	10	13	30	53	−23	24	1973 Copa Perú
16	Defensor Arica	30	4	8	18	24	61	−37	16	1973 Copa Perú

== Copa Libertadores ==
=== Group Stage ===
25 February 1972 1	Universitario de Deportes (Peru)	2–1	(Peru) Alianza Lima	Estadio Nacional, Lima
	Rojas 17'; Ramírez 44'	Report	Rivero Arias 3'	Attendance: 30,000; Referee: Cesar Orosco (Peru)

7 March 1972 2	Universidad de Chile	1–0	(Peru) Universitario de Deportes	Estadio Nacional, Santiago
	Sarnari 67'	Report		Attendance: 31,189; Referee: Favilli Neto (Brazil)

11 March 1972 3	Unión San Felipe (Chile)	1–3	(Peru) Universitario de Deportes	Estadio Nacional, Santiago
	Bailetti 13', 54'; Rojas 35'	Report		Attendance: 46,530; Referee: Robert Goicochea (Argentina)

14 March 1972 4	Alianza Lima (Peru)	2–2	(Peru) Universitario de Deportes	Estadio Nacional, Lima
	Cubillas 44', 78'; Rojas 80', 82'	Report		Attendance: 45,000; Referee: José Romei (Paraguay)

21 March 1972 5	Universitario de Deportes (Peru)	0–0	(Chile) Unión San Felipe	Estadio Nacional, Lima
		Report		Attendance: 55,000; Referee: Robert Goicochea (Argentina)

26 March 1972 6	Universitario de Deportes (Peru)	2–1	Universidad de Chile	Estadio Nacional, Lima
	Ramírez 27'; Rojas 42'	Report	Sarnari 71'	Attendance: 44,000; Referee: Isidro Ramírez (Paraguay)

=== Semifinals ===
11 April 1972 1	Universitario de Deportes (Peru)	2–3	(Uruguay) Peñarol	Estadio Nacional, Lima
	Techera 36'; Vílchez 89'	Report	Jiménez 25'; Viera 57'; Amoroso 87'	Attendance: 20,000; Referee: Robert Goicochea (Argentina)

14 April 1972 2	Universitario de Deportes (Peru)	3–0	(Uruguay) Nacional	Estadio Nacional, Lima
	Vílchez 77', 90'; Ramírez 81'	Report		Attendance: 30,000; Referee: José Romei (Uruguay)

25 April 1972 3	Nacional (Uruguay)	3–3	(Peru) Universitario de Deportes	Centenario, Montevideo
	Artime 5'; Cubilla 59', 80' (pen.)	Report	Ramírez 10', 43', 55'	Attendance: 15,000; Referee: Vicente Llobregat (Venezuela)

29 April 1972 4	Peñarol (Uruguay)	1–1	(Peru) Universitario de Deportes	Centenario, Montevideo
	Viera 72'	Report	Vílchez 60'	Attendance: 31,648; Referee: Agomir Martins (Brazil)

=== Finals ===
17 May 1972 First leg	Universitario de Deportes (Peru)	0–0	(Argentina) Independiente	Estadio Nacional, Lima
		Report		Attendance: 45,000; Referee: Armando Marques (Brazil)

24 May 1972 Second leg	Independiente (Argentina)	2–1	(Peru) Universitario de Deportes	La Doble Visera, Avellaneda
	Maglioni 6', 62'	Report	Rojas 79'	Attendance: 55,000; Referee: Favilli Neto (Brazil)
