= 1974 Club Universitario de Deportes season =

Universitario de Deportes
1973 season
- Chairman: Carlos Melzi
- Manager: (Uruguay) Juan Hohberg
- Stadium: Teodoro Lolo Fernández
- Torneo Descentralizado: Champions
- Top goalscorer: League: Oswaldo Ramírez (24); All: Oswaldo Ramírez (24)
- Biggest win: 4–0: vs Carlos A. Mannucci; 4–0: vs Alfonso Ugarte; 5–1: vs Deportivo Municipal
Home colours

Club Universitario de Deportes 1974 season was the club's 50th year of existence, the 107th year in professional football and the 52nd in the top level of professional football in Peru.

== Squad ==
No.	Pos.	Nation	Player
—	GK	ARG	Humberto Horacio Ballesteros
—	GK	PER	Luis Rubiños
—	GK	PER	Ricardo Valderrama
—	DF	PER	Carlos Carbonell
—	DF	PER	Eleazar Soria
—	DF	PER	Fernando Cuéllar
—	DF	PER	Héctor Chumpitaz
—	DF	PER	Juan Manuel Toyco
—	DF	PER	Eduardo Wolf
—	DF	PER	Alberto Marticorena
—	DF	PER	Víctor Luis Montero
—	DF	PER	Rubén Toribio Díaz
—	MF	PER	Fernando Alva
—	MF	PER	Santiago Gastulo
—	MF	PER	David Zuluaga
—	MF	PER	César Peralta

No.	Pos.	Nation	Player
—	MF	PER	Marcos Portilla
—	MF	URU	Rubén Techera
—	MF	PER	Ángel Uribe
—	MF	PER	Víctor Romero
—	FW	PER	Tadeo Risco
—	FW	PER	Héctor Bailetti
—	FW	PER	Víctor Calatayud
—	FW	PER	Juan José Oré
—	FW	PER	Juan Carlos Oblitas
—	FW	PER	Oswaldo Ramírez
—	FW	PER	Percy Rojas
—	FW	PER	Juan Carlos Vargas
—	FW	PER	Percy Vílchez
—	FW	PER	William Vidarte Arbulú
—	FW	PER	Julio Aparicio

== Match Results ==
=== Torneo Descentralizado ===
24 March 1974 1	Carlos A. Mannucci	1–5	Universitario de Deportes	Mansiche, Trujillo
	Lobatón 24'	Report	Portilla 41', 42'; Ramírez 59', 82', 87'

30 March 1974 2	Sporting Cristal	1–2	Universitario de Deportes	Estadio Nacional, Lima
	Soria 30' (o.g.)	Report	Ramírez 25', 87'

7 April 1974 3	Universitario de Deportes	2–2	Melgar	Teodoro Lolo Fernández, Lima
	Portilla 2'; Ramírez 10'	Report	Argote 77'; Novella 90'

14 April 1974 4	Universitario de Deportes	4–0	Alfonso Ugarte	Teodoro Lolo Fernández, Lima
	Techera 17'; Carbonell 53'; Ramírez 66'; Oblitas 76'	Report

21 April 1974 5	Piérola	0–3	Universitario de Deportes	Melgar, Arequipa
		Report	Portilla 3'; Julio Aparicio 46'; Salguero 85' (o.g.)

28 April 1974 6	Universitario de Deportes	2–3	Atlético Grau	Nacional, Lima
	Portilla 16'; Oblitas 85'	Report	Echeandía 15', 65'; Elcorrobarrutia 60'

5 May 1974 7	Cienciano	0–0	Universitario de Deportes	Garcilaso, Cusco
		Report

11 May 1974 8	Universitario de Deportes	1–1	Defensor Lima	Nacional, Lima
	Oblitas 59'	Report	Gonzales 50'

19 May 1974 9	Universitario de Deportes	1–2	Unión Huaral	Nacional, Lima
	Ramírez 75'	Report	Chirinos 20', 22'

26 May 1974 10	Universitario de Deportes	1–0	Walter Ormeño	Nacional, Lima
	Chumpitaz 88'	Report

2 June 1974 11	Juan Aurich	3–3	Universitario de Deportes	César Flores Marigorda, Lambayeque
	Arnáez 16'; Cadenillas 55'; Rubianes 68'	Report	Ramírez 30', 80'; Chumpitaz 78'

9 June 1974 12	Unión Tumán	2–2	Universitario de Deportes	Eugenio Zapata Mingoya, Tumán
	Pianetti 5'; Bolivar 74'	Report	Oré 75'; Ramírez 88'

16 June 1974 13	Universitario de Deportes	5–1	Deportivo Municipal	Nacional, Lima
	Oré 20', 25'; Ramírez 21', 64'; Oblitas 67'	Report	Mellán 37'

23 June 1974 14	Deportivo Junín	0–4	Universitario de Deportes	Huancayo, Huancayo
		Report	Aparicio 11'; Chumpitaz 17'; Ramírez 61'; Techera 70'

29 June 1974 15	Universitario de Deportes	3–1	León de Huánuco	Nacional, Lima
	Oré 33'; Toyco 70'; Ramírez 81'	Report	Rodríguez Saavedra 83'

6 July 1974 16	Universitario de Deportes	3–0	Unión Pesquero	Nacional, Lima
	Techera 3'; Oré 65', 70'	Report

14 July 1974 17	Universitario de Deportes	2–0	Alianza Lima	Nacional, Lima
	Aparicio 5'; Rojas 20'	Report		Attendance: 40,000; Referee: Luis Gonzáles

20 July 1974 18	Barrio Frigorífico	2–3	Universitario de Deportes	Telmo Carbajo
	Aguilar 8'; Zevallos 60'	Report	Chumpitaz 20'; Ramírez 48'; Cuéllar 85'

29 July 1974 19	Universitario de Deportes	1–0	Sport Boys	Nacional, Lima
	Techera 14'	Report

10 August 1974 20	CNI de Iquitos	0–2	Universitario de Deportes	Max Augustín, Iquitos
		Report	Oblitas 32'; Ramírez 62'

18 August 1974 21	Universitario de Deportes	2–0	Atlético Chalaco	Nacional, Lima
	Rojas 79'; Oré 90'	Report

24 August 1974 22	Universitario de Deportes	4–0	Carlos A. Mannucci	Teodoro Lolo Fernández, Lima
	Oblitas 13'; Rojas 34', 69'; Soria 74'	Report

1 September 1974 23	Universitario de Deportes	2–2	Sporting Cristal	Nacional, Lima
	Rojas 16'; Ramírez 87'	Report	Gallardo 50'; Obregozo 68'

8 September 1974 24	Melgar	0–0	Universitario de Deportes	Melgar, Arequipa
		Report

15 September 1974 25	Alfonso Ugarte	0–0	Universitario de Deportes	E. Torres Belón, Puno
		Report

22 September 1974 26	Universitario de Deportes	1–1	Piérola	Nacional, Lima
	Ramírez 43'	Report	Fernández 4'

29 September 1974 27	Club Atlético Grau	2–2	Universitario de Deportes	Miguel Grau, Piura
	Suárez 16'; Gutiérrez 69'	Report	Rojas 14'; Ramírez 28'

13 October 1974 28	Universitario de Deportes	3–0	Cienciano	Teodoro Lolo Fernández, Lima
	Techera 13'; Cuéllar 77'; Soria 89'	Report

20 October 1974 29	Defensor Lima	3–3	Universitario de Deportes	Estadio Nacional, Lima
	La Rosa 44'; Barbadillo 49'; Gonzales 68'	Report	Techera 60'; Portilla 76'; Oblitas 84'

27 October 1974 30	Unión Huaral	0–3	Universitario de Deportes	Estadio Nacional, Lima
	La Rosa 44'; Barbadillo 49'; Gonzales 68'	Report	Rojas 51'; Cuéllar 74'; Portilla 83'

3 November 1974 31	Walter Ormeño	1–1	Universitario de Deportes	Roberto Yañez, Cañete
	Candela 20'	Report	Oré 49'

10 November 1974 32	Universitario de Deportes	3–2	Juan Aurich	Nacional, Lima
	Portilla 21'; Oblitas 76'; Ramírez 79'	Report	Sanjinez 11'; Gonzales 89'

17 November 1974 33	Universitario de Deportes	1–0	Unión Tumán	Nacional, Lima
	Wolf 52'	Report

17 November 1974 34	Deportivo Municipal	2–3	Universitario de Deportes	Nacional, Lima
	Mellán 15', 86'	Report	Wolf 22'; Oré 32'; Cuéllar 38'

1 December 1974 35	Universitario de Deportes	2–2	Deportivo Junín	Teodoro Lolo Fernández, Lima
	Techera 41'; Ramírez 61'	Report	Avilés 35'; Correa 83'

8 December 1974 36	León de Huánuco	1–2	Universitario de Deportes	Heraclio Tapia, Huánuco
	Sandoval 30'	Report	Oré 70'; Portilla 85'

15 December 1974 37	Unión Pesquero	0–1	Universitario de Deportes	Mariscal Nieto, Ilo
		Report	Ramírez 87'

22 December 1974 38	Alianza Lima	0–3	Universitario de Deportes	Nacional, Lima
		Report	Ramírez 41' (pen.); Soria 50'; Oré 73'

5 January 1975 39	Universitario de Deportes	4–0	Atlético Barrio Frigorífico	Nacional, Lima
	Oré 25', 80'; Oblitas 56', 74'	Report

12 January 1975 40	Sport Boys	1–2	Universitario de Deportes	Nacional, Lima
	Ramírez 15'	Report	Ramírez 30'; Oré 49'

5 January 1975 41	Universitario de Deportes	3–3	CNI de Iquitos	Nacional, Lima
	Soria 32'; Ramírez 44'; Oré 47'	Report	Nieri 3'; Mori 13'; Navarro 60'

2 February 1974 42	Atlético Chalaco	2–2	Universitario de Deportes	Estadio Nacional, Lima
	Santiago Ojeda 3', 15'	Report	Chumpitaz 70'; Oré 72'

16 February 1975 Liguilla Final Round 1	Universitario de Deportes	1–0	Unión Huaral	Nacional, Lima
	Oblitas 75'	Report

20 February 1975 Liguilla Final Round 2	Universitario de Deportes	2–1	Defensor Lima	Nacional, Lima
	Oré 3'; Techera 53'	Report	Stucchi 54'

23 February 1975 Liguilla Final Round 3	Universitario de Deportes	1–0	Unión Tumán	Nacional, Lima
	Oblitas 18'	Report

26 August 1974 Liguilla Final Round 4	CNI de Iquitos	0–1	Universitario de Deportes	Max Augustín, Iquitos
		Report	Ramírez 80'

2 March 1975 Liguilla Final Round 5	Alianza Lima	3–1	Universitario de Deportes	Alejandro Villanueva, Lima
	Soria 63'	Report	Sánchez 17' Zegarra 68' Gómez Laynes 90'	Attendance: 10,000; Referee: Pedro Reyes
