= 1971 Club Universitario de Deportes season =

Universitario de Deportes
1971 season
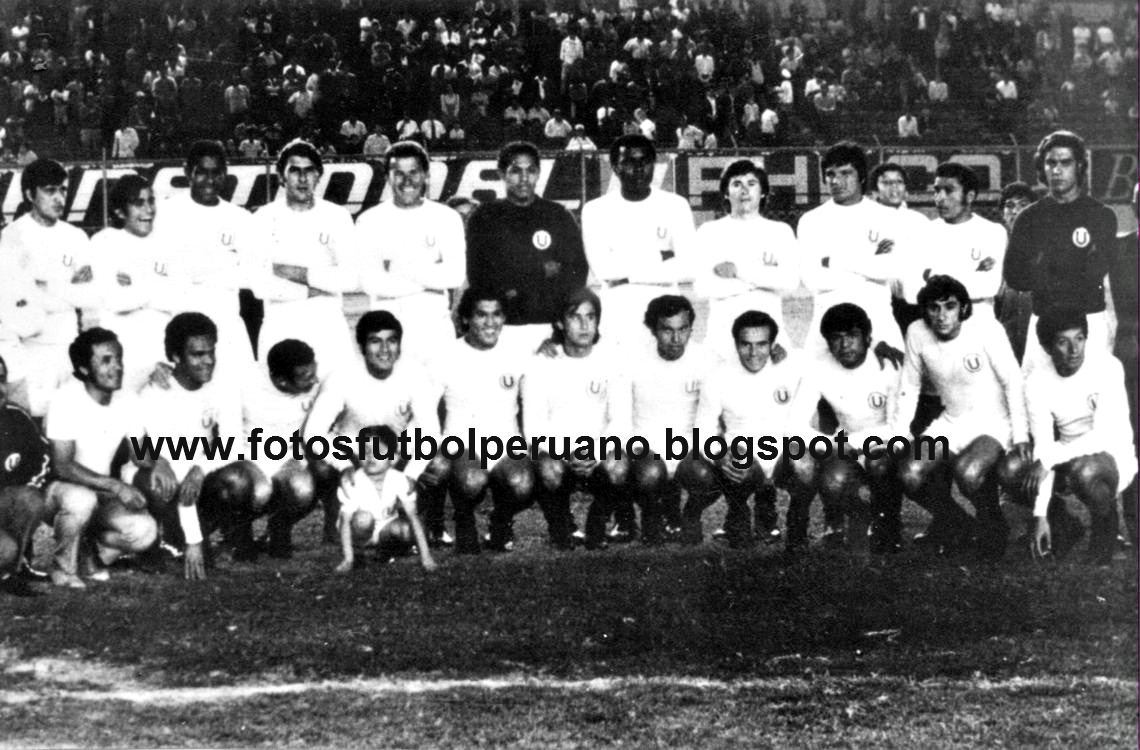
- Chairman: Rafael Quirós
- Manager: (Uruguay) Roberto Scarone
- Stadium: Teodoro Lolo Fernández
- Torneo Descentralizado: 1971
- Copa Libertadores: Second phase
- Top goalscorer: League: Héctor Bailetti (13); All: Héctor Bailetti (13)
- Biggest win: 3–0: vs Sporting Cristal
Home colours

Club Universitario de Deportes' 1971 season was the club's 47th year of existence, the 104th year in professional football and the 59th in the top level of professional football in Peru.

== Squad ==
A majority of players of the 1971 season were transferred to play for Defensor Lima. However this year also marked the debut of various star players for the club.

No.	Pos.	Nation	Player
—	GK	ARG	Humberto Horacio Ballesteros
—	GK	PER	Rubén Correa
—	GK	PER	Jesús Goyzueta
—	GK	PER	Eloy Martín
—	DF	PER	Eleazar Soria
—	DF	PER	Julio Luna Portal
—	DF	PER	Fernando Cuéllar
—	DF	PER	Luis La Fuente
—	DF	PER	Héctor Chumpitaz
—	DF	PER	Félix Salinas
—	DF	PER	Guillermo Palacios
—	DF	PER	Leonardo Saavedra
—	MF	PER	Luis Cruzado
—	MF	PER	Hernán Castañeda
—	MF	PER	Roberto Chale

No.	Pos.	Nation	Player
—	MF	PER	Eduardo Wolf
—	MF	PER	Pedro González
—	MF	PER	José Antonio Plá
—	FW	PER	Juan José Muñante
—	FW	PER	Ángel Uribe
—	FW	PER	Percy Rojas
—	FW	PER	Juan Carlos Oblitas
—	FW	PER	Fernando Alva
—	FW	URU	Carlos Jurado
—	FW	PER	Oswaldo Ramírez
—	FW	PER	Víctor Calatayud
—	FW	PER	Héctor Bailetti
—	FW	PER	Rodolfo Pedreschi
—	FW	PER	Carlos Urrunaga
—	FW	PER	Percy Vílchez

== Torneo Descentralizado ==
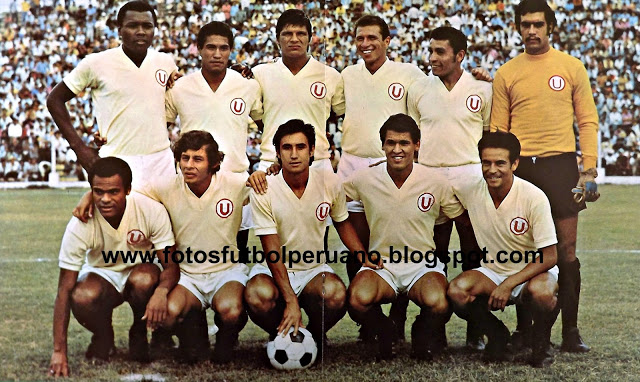
The starting XI for the season. Standing from left to right: Félix Salinas, Pedro González Zavala, Luis La Fuente, Luis Cruzado, Héctor Chumpitaz and Humberto Horacio Ballesteros. Crouching: Juan José Muñante, Roberto Chale, Percy Rojas, Héctor Bailetti and Oswaldo Ramírez.

The 1971 Torneo Descentralizado had fourteen teams participating. Universitario become champions in this edition of the tournament, proceeding for the 1971 Copa Libertadores.

Pos	Team	Pld	W	D	L	GF	GA	GD	Pts	Qualification or relegation
1	Universitario	30	18	10	2	57	20	+37	46	1972 Copa Libertadores
2	Alianza Lima	30	16	8	6	50	25	+25	40	1972 Copa Libertadores
3	Defensor Lima	30	14	11	5	48	30	+18	39	
4	Sporting Cristal	30	13	12	5	50	36	+14	38	
5	Deportivo Municipal	30	14	9	7	47	34	+13	37	
6	Juan Aurich	30	15	6	9	48	37	+11	36	
7	Melgar	30	10	14	6	40	30	+10	34	
8	Atlético Torino	30	10	10	10	30	38	−8	30	
9	Sport Boys	30	9	11	10	30	27	+3	29	
10	Unión Tumán	30	9	8	13	38	50	−12	26	
11	Carlos A. Mannucci	30	7	10	13	43	49	−6	24	
12	Defensor Arica	30	8	8	14	30	46	−16	24	
13	José Gálvez	30	5	10	15	27	50	−23	20	
14	ADO	30	5	10	15	32	56	−24	20	1972 Segunda División
15	Octavio Espinosa	30	6	7	17	26	43	−17	19	1972 Copa Perú
16	Porvenir Miraflores	30	3	12	15	38	63	−25	18	1972 Segunda División

== 1971 Copa Libertadores ==
The 1971 Copa Libertadores was the 12th edition of the tournament with Universitario being part of Group 1, moving on to the second phase before being eliminated from the tournament.

=== Group Stage ===
Pos	Team	Pld	W	D	L	GF	GA	GD	Pts	Qualification or relegation	(Peru) UNI	(Argentina) ROS	(Argentina) BOC	(Peru) CRI
1	(Peru) Universitario	6	3	3	0	8	4	+4	9	Qualified to the Semifinals		3–2	0–0	3–0
2	(Argentina) Rosario Central	6	3	1	2	11	8	+3	7		2–2		w.o.	4–0
3	(Argentina) Boca Juniors	6	1	2	3	4	5	−1	4		w.o.	2–1		2–2
4	(Peru) Sporting Cristal	6	1	2	3	5	11	−6	4		0–0	1–2	2–0	

Legend: Blue = home team win; Yellow = draw; Red = away team win.

=== Semifinals ===
Pos	Team	Pld	W	D	L	GF	GA	GD	Pts	Qualification or relegation	(Uruguay) NAC	(Brazil) PAL	(Peru) UNI
1	(Uruguay) Nacional	4	3	1	0	9	1	+8	7	Qualified to the Final		3–1	3–0
2	(Brazil) Palmeiras	4	2	0	2	6	7	−1	4		0–3ú		3–0
3	(Peru) Universitario	4	0	1	3	1	8	−7	1		0–0	1–2	

Legend: Blue = home team win; Yellow = draw; Red = away team win.

== Friendlies ==
5 January 1971	Universitario de Deportes (Peru)	2–2	(Germany) Bayern Munich	Lima, Lima Province, Peru
	Ramírez (?), (?)	Report	(?), (?)	Stadium: Estadio Nacional del Perú
