= 1970 Club Universitario de Deportes season =

Universitario de Deportes
1970 season
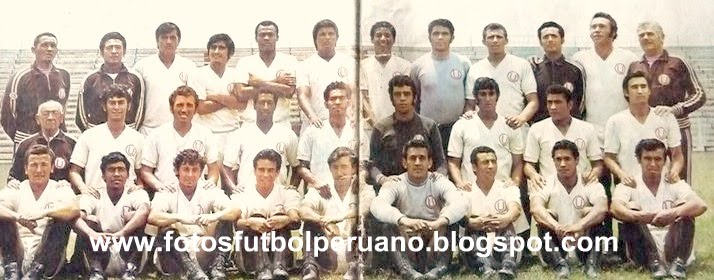
- Chairman: Rafael Quirós
- Manager: (Uruguay) Roberto Scarone
- Stadium: Teodoro Lolo Fernández
- Torneo Descentralizado: 1970
- Copa Libertadores: Second phase
- Top goalscorer: League: Percy Rojas (15); All: Percy Rojas (15)
- Biggest win: 4–0: vs Porvenir Miraflores; vs Atlético Grau
Home colours

Club Universitario de Deportes' 1970 season was the club's 46th year of existence, the 103rd year in professional football and the 58th in the top level of professional football in Peru.

== Squad ==
Many players of the Peru national football team that played in the 1970 FIFA World Cup would also play for Universitario.

No.	Pos.	Nation	Player
—	GK	PER	Ricardo Valderrama
—	GK	PER	Roberto Marius
—	GK	PER	Jesús Goyzueta
—	GK	PER	Rubén Correa
—	DF	PER	Eleazar Soria
—	DF	PER	Julio Luna Portal
—	DF	PER	Fernando Cuéllar
—	DF	PER	Nicolás Fuentes
—	DF	PER	Luis La Fuente
—	DF	PER	Héctor Chumpitaz
—	DF	PER	José Fernández (c)
—	DF	PER	Félix Salinas
—	MF	PER	Luis Cruzado
—	MF	PER	Hernán Castañeda
—	MF	PER	Roberto Chale

No.	Pos.	Nation	Player
—	MF	PER	Eduardo Wolf
—	MF	PER	Pedro González
—	FW	PER	Juan José Muñante
—	FW	PER	Ángel Uribe
—	FW	PER	Percy Rojas
—	FW	PER	Juan Carlos Oblitas
—	FW	PER	Fernando Alva
—	FW	URU	Carlos Jurado
—	FW	PER	Oswaldo Ramírez
—	FW	PER	Fernando Cerro
—	FW	PER	Víctor Calatayud
—	FW	PER	Enrique Casaretto
—	FW	PER	Enrique Rodríguez
—	FW	PER	Óscar Ríos
—	FW	PER	Héctor Bailetti

== Torneo Descentralizado ==
The 1970 Torneo Descentralizado would have fourteen teams participate in it. Universitario would reach runners-up and qualified for the following 1971 Copa Libertadores.

=== First stage ===
Pos	Team	Pld	W	D	L	GF	GA	GD	Pts	Qualification
1	Universitario	26	16	7	3	56	22	+34	56	Liguilla Final
2	Defensor Arica	26	13	7	6	38	26	+12	53	Liguilla Final
3	Sporting Cristal	26	13	8	5	44	25	+19	49	Liguilla Final
4	Juan Aurich	26	10	10	6	34	25	+9	45	Liguilla Final
5	Deportivo Municipal	26	10	9	7	32	31	+1	44	Liguilla Final
6	Octavio Espinosa	26	6	13	7	14	13	+1	39	Liguilla Final
7	Defensor Lima	26	8	9	9	25	24	+1	37	Liguilla Final
8	Sport Boys	26	8	7	11	31	38	−7	36	Liguilla Descenso
9	Alianza Lima	26	8	8	10	44	40	+4	34	Liguilla Descenso
10	Porvenir Miraflores	26	6	10	10	32	41	−9	33	Liguilla Descenso
11	Carlos A. Mannucci	26	8	6	12	29	37	−8	32	Liguilla Descenso
12	Deportivo SIMA	26	5	11	10	21	31	−10	32	Liguilla Descenso
13	Atlético Grau	26	5	8	13	24	41	−17	28	Liguilla Descenso
14	Atlético Torino	26	7	5	14	25	52	−27	28	Liguilla Descenso

=== Second stage ===
Pos	Team	Pld	W	D	L	GF	GA	GD	BP	Pts	Qualification
1	Sporting Cristal	32	18	9	5	58	32	+26	26	71	1971 Copa Libertadores
2	Universitario	32	19	8	5	69	30	+39	24	70	1971 Copa Libertadores
3	Defensor Arica	32	15	9	8	43	30	+13	26	65	
4	Juan Aurich	32	13	10	9	44	36	+8	21	57	1971 Copa Ganadores de Copa
5	Defensor Lima	32	10	11	11	33	32	+1	18	49	
6	Deportivo Municipal	32	11	9	12	37	44	−7	17	48	
7	Octavio Espinosa	32	7	15	10	22	28	−6	18	47	

== Copa Libertadores ==
The 1970 Copa Libertadores was the 11th edition of the tournament with Universitario being part of Group 4 before moving on to the second phase before being eliminated from the tournament.

=== Group Stage ===
Pos	Team	Pld	W	D	L	GF	GA	GD	Pts	Qualification	(Peru) UNI	(Ecuador) LDU	(Peru) DEF	(Ecuador) CDA
1	(Peru) Universitario	6	4	1	1	11	4	+7	9	Qualified to the Second Phase		2–0	2–1	3–0
2	(Ecuador) LDU Quito	6	3	1	2	10	6	+4	7	Qualified to the Second Phase	2–0		1–2	4–1
3	(Peru) Defensor Arica	6	1	3	2	5	6	−1	5		1–1	0–0		0–1
4	(Ecuador) América de Quito	6	1	1	4	4	14	−10	3		0–3	1–3	1–1	

Legend: Blue = home team win; Yellow = draw; Red = away team win.

=== Second Phase ===
Pos	Team	Pld	W	D	L	GF	GA	GD	Pts	Qualification	(Argentina) RIV	(Argentina) BOC	(Peru) UNI
1	(Argentina) River Plate	4	3	1	0	9	5	+4	7	Qualified to the Third phase		1–0	5–3
2	(Argentina) Boca Juniors	4	2	1	1	5	3	+2	5		1–1		1–0
3	(Peru) Universitario	4	0	0	4	5	11	−6	0		1–2	1–3	

Legend: Blue = home team win; Yellow = draw; Red = away team win.
April 11, 1970

Universitario (Peru)	1 – 3	(Argentina) Boca Juniors

Lima, Peru

April 14, 1970

Universitario (Peru)	1 – 2	(Argentina) River Plate

Lima, Peru

April 16, 1970

River Plate (Argentina)	1 – 0	(Argentina) Boca Juniors

Buenos Aires, Argentina

April 22, 1970

Boca Juniors (Argentina)	1 – 0	(Peru) Universitario

Buenos Aires, Argentina

April 25, 1970

River Plate (Argentina)	5 – 3	(Peru) Universitario

Buenos Aires, Argentina

April 30, 1970

Boca Juniors (Argentina)	1 – 1	(Argentina) River Plate

Buenos Aires, Argentina
