= 1972 Copa Libertadores finals =

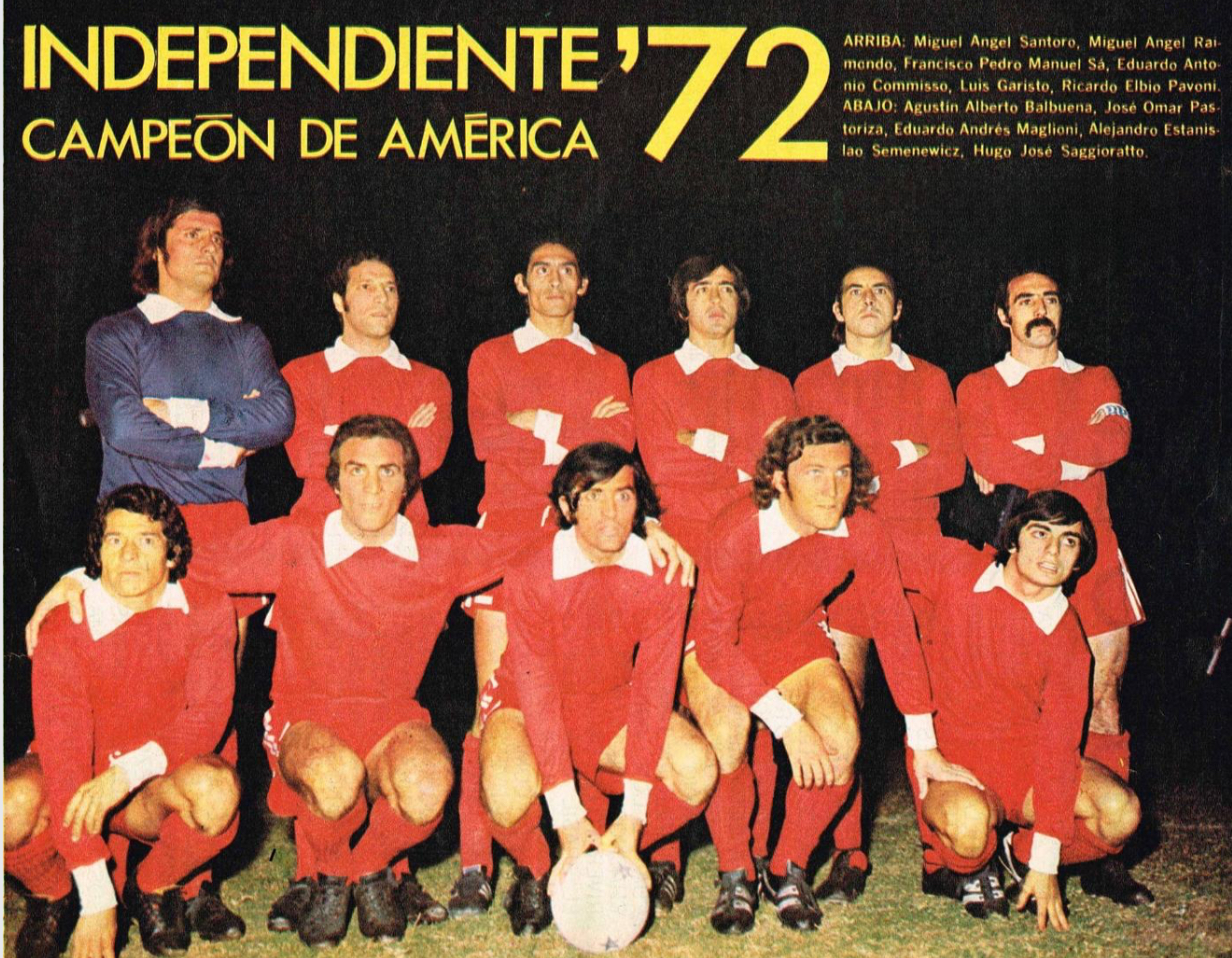
- Independiente, champions
- Event: 1972 Copa Libertadores de América
Universitario	Independiente
(Peru)	(Argentina)
1	2
- Independiente won 2-1 on aggregate

First leg
Universitario	Independiente
0	0
- Date: May 17, 1972
- Venue: Estadio Nacional, Lima
- Referee: Armando Marques (Brazil)
- Attendance: 45,473

Second leg
Independiente	Universitario
2	1
- Date: May 24, 1972
- Venue: La Doble Visera, Avellaneda
- Referee: José Favilli Neto (Brazil)
- Attendance: 55,000

The 1972 Copa Libertadores de América finals was the final two-legged tie to determine the champion of the 1972 edition of Copa Libertadores. It was contested by Argentine club Independiente and Peruvian club Universitario. The first leg of the tie was played on May 17 at Estadio Nacional in Lima with the second leg played on May 24 at Estadio de Independiente in Avellaneda.

Independiente won 2-1 on aggregate, achieving its third Copa Libertadores title.

== Qualified teams ==
Team	Previous finals app.
(Peru) Universitario	None
(Argentina) Independiente	**1964**, **1965**

- **Bold** indicates winning years

== Venues ==
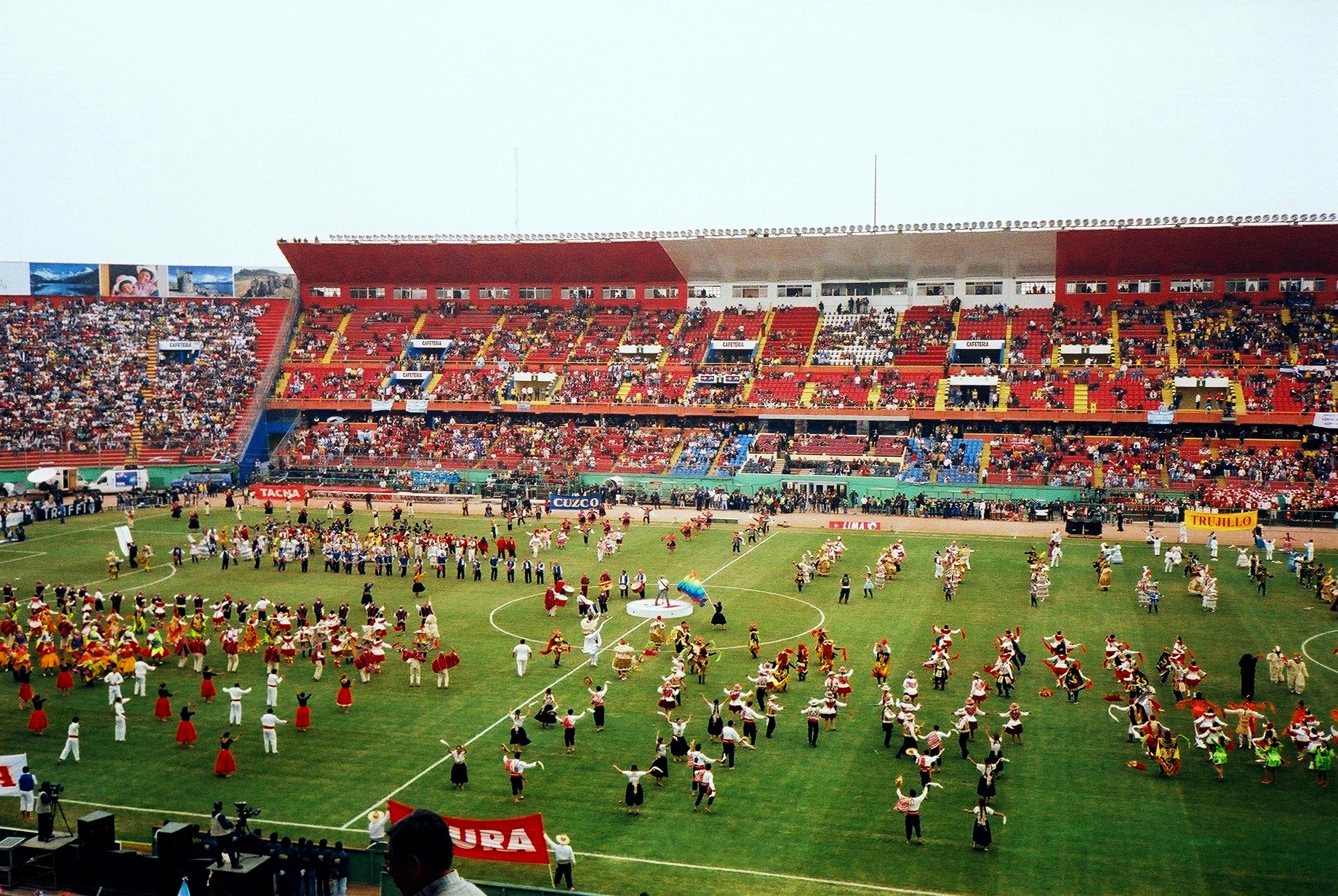
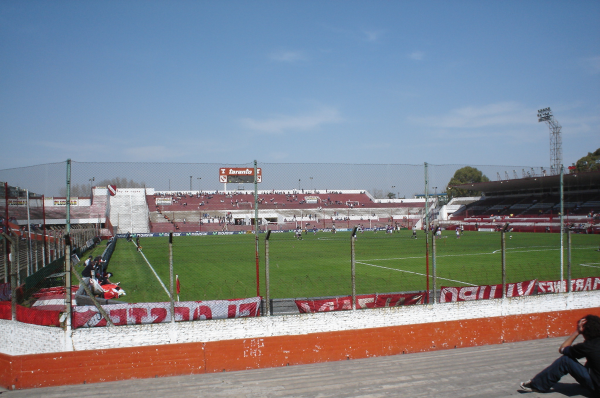
Estadio Nacional (Lima) and Estadio de Independiente (Avellaneda), venues for the finals

== Match details ==
=== First leg ===
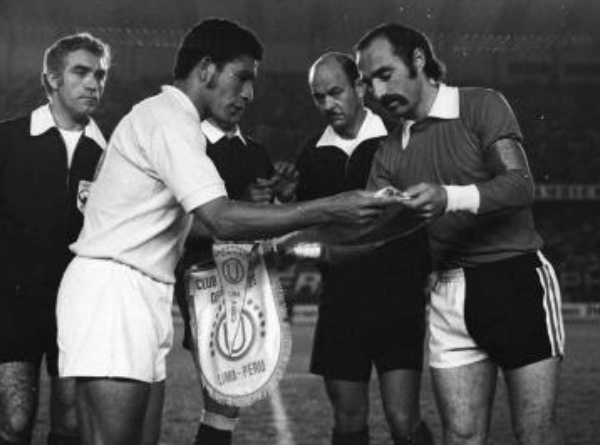
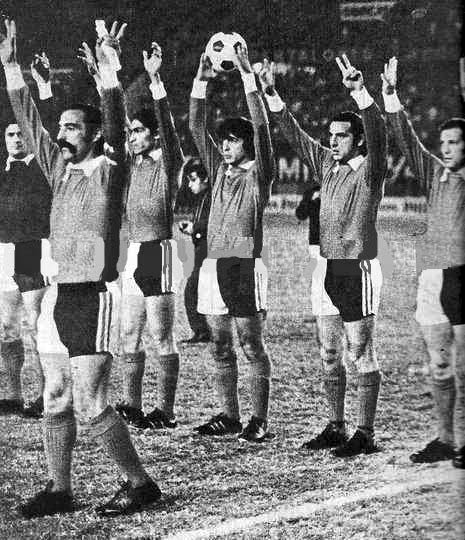
Two moments of the match, with both captains (left) and Independiente players saluting to supporters
1972 Copa Libertadores finals
May 17, 1972
First leg

Universitario (Peru)	0–0	(Argentina) Independiente

Estadio Nacional, Lima
Attendance: 45,000
Referee: Marques (Brazil)

**Universitario**	**Independiente**

GK
DF
DF
DF
DF
MF
MF
MF
FW
FW
FW
Substitutes:
MF
Manager:
(Uruguay) Roberto Scarone

(Argentina) Humberto H. Ballesteros
(Peru) Eleazar Soria
(Peru) Fernando Cuéllar
(Peru) Héctor Chumpitaz (C)
(Peru) Julio Luna Portal
(Uruguay) Rubén Techera
(Peru) Carlos Carbonell	Substituted off
(Peru) Hernán Castañeda
(Peru) Percy Rojas
(Peru) Oswaldo Ramírez
(Peru) Héctor Bailetti
(Peru) Ángel Uribe	Substituted on

GK	(Argentina) Miguel Ángel Santoro
DF	(Argentina) Eduardo Commisso
DF	(Argentina) Francisco Sá (C)
DF	(Argentina) Luis Garisto
DF	(Uruguay) Ricardo Pavoni
MF	(Argentina) José Pastoriza
MF	(Argentina) Miguel Ángel Raimondo
FW	(Argentina) Alejandro Semenewicz
FW	(Argentina) Agustín Balbuena	Substituted off
FW	(Argentina) Eduardo Maglioni
FW	(Argentina) Hugo Saggioratto
Substitutes:
FW	(Italy) Dante Mircoli	Substituted on
Manager:
(Argentina) Pedro Dellacha

=== Second leg ===
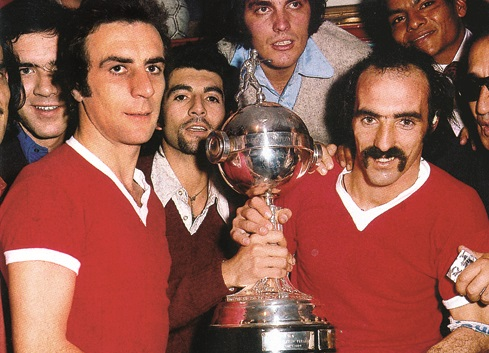
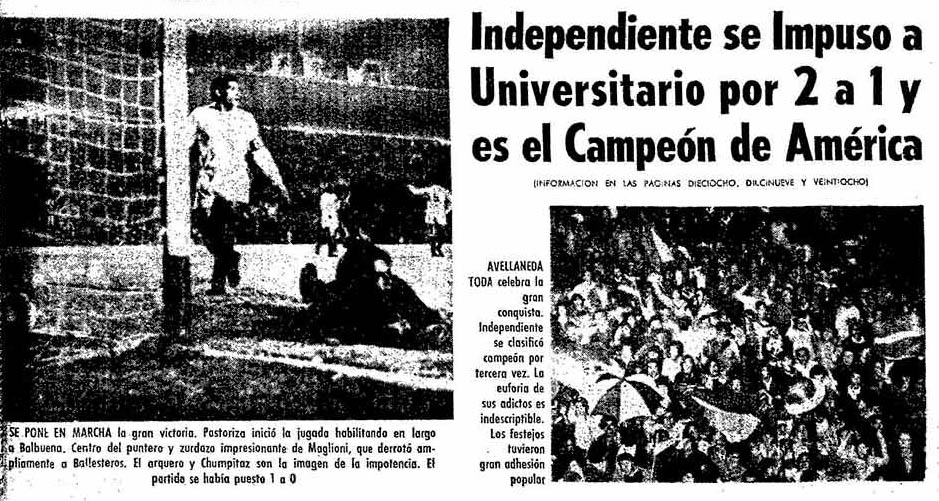
(Left): José Pastoriza and Ricardo Pavoni with the Cup; (right): Argentine newspaper Clarín covering the 3rd. Libertadores title for Independiente
May 24, 1972
Second leg

Independiente (Argentina)	2–1	(Peru) Universitario
Maglioni 6' 61'		Rojas 79'

Estadio de Independiente, Avellaneda
Attendance: 55,000
Referee: Favilli Neto (Brazil)

**Independiente**	**Universitario**

GK	(Argentina) Miguel Ángel Santoro
DF	(Argentina) Eduardo Commisso
DF	(Argentina) Francisco Sá (C)
DF	(Argentina) Luis Garisto
DF	(Uruguay) Ricardo Pavoni
MF	(Argentina) José Pastoriza
MF	(Argentina) Miguel Ángel Raimondo	Substituted off
FW	(Argentina) Alejandro Semenewicz
FW	(Argentina) Agustín Balbuena
FW	(Argentina) Eduardo Maglioni
FW	(Argentina) Hugo Saggioratto
Substitutes:
FW	(Argentina) Carlos Bulla	Substituted on
Manager:
(Argentina) Pedro Dellacha

GK	(Argentina) Humberto H. Ballesteros
DF	(Peru) Eleazar Soria
DF	(Peru) Fernando Cuéllar
DF	(Peru) Héctor Chumpitaz (C)
DF	(Peru) Julio Luna Portal
MF	(Uruguay) Rubén Techera	Substituted off
MF	(Peru) Luis Cruzado
MF	(Peru) Hernán Castañeda
FW	(Peru) Percy Rojas
FW	(Peru) Oswaldo Ramírez	Substituted off
FW	(Peru) Juan José Muñante
Substitutes:
MF	(Peru) Fernando Alva	Substituted on
MF	(Peru) Héctor Bailetti	Substituted on
Manager:
(Uruguay) Roberto Scarone
