= Carlos Carbonell =

Peruvian footballer (born 1951)

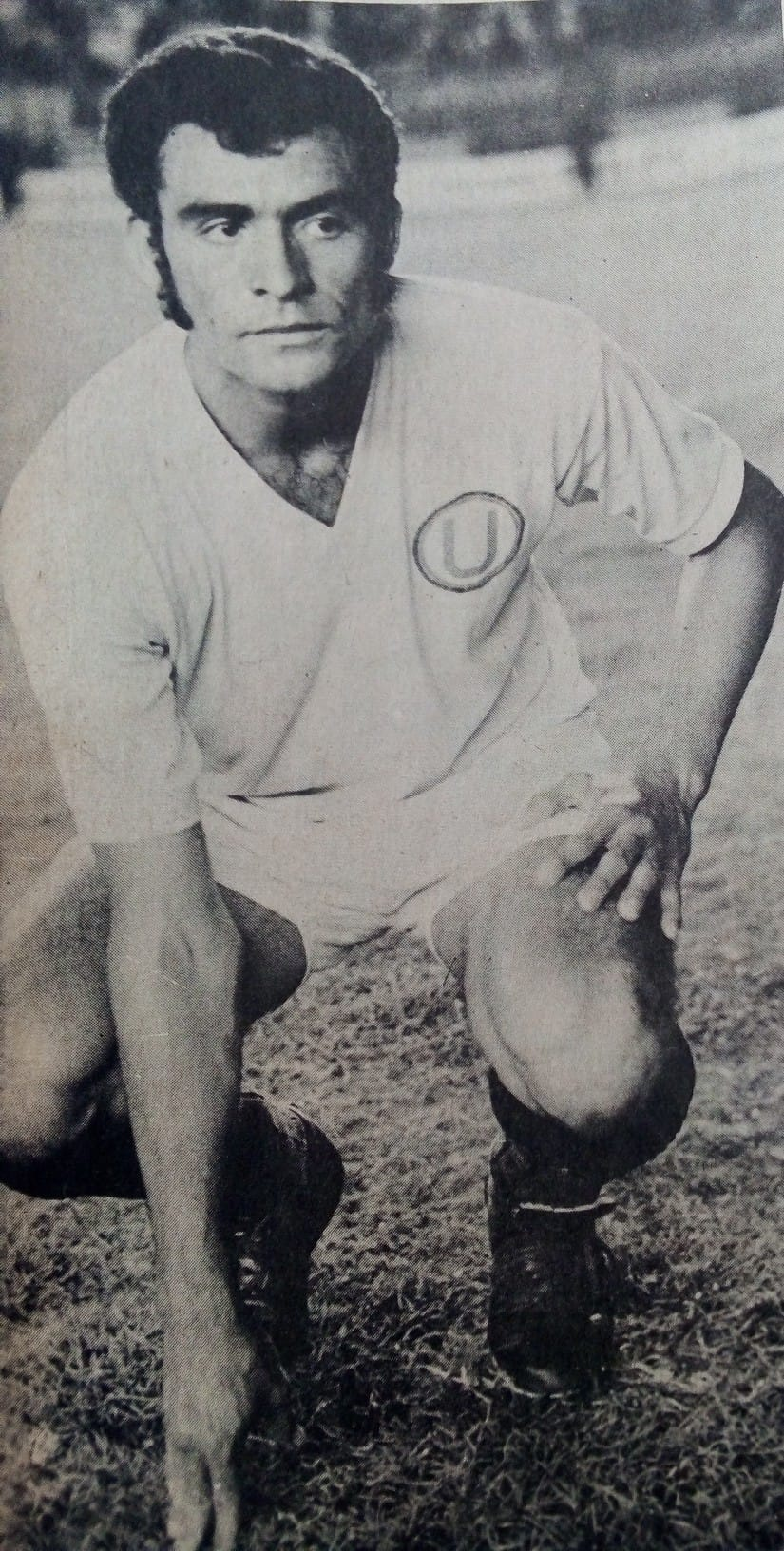
- Carbonell in the 1972 season

Personal information
- Full name: Carlos Genaro Carbonell Baca
- Date of birth: 28 March 1951 (age 75)
- Place of birth: Chiclayo, Lambayeque, Peru
- Height: 1.73 m (5 ft 8 in)
- Position: Defender

Senior career*
| Years | Team | Apps | (Gls) |
| 1969–1971 | Juan Aurich | | |
| 1972–1975 | Universitario de Deportes | | |
| 1975–1977 | Atlas | | |
| 1977–1980 | Sporting Cristal | | |
| 1980 | ADT de Tarma | | |
| 1981 | Universitario de Deportes | | |
| 1982 | ADT de Tarma | | |
| 1983 | Sport Boys | | |
| 1984–1985 | Los Espartanos | | |

International career
| 1973 | Peru | 1 | (0) |
- * Club domestic league appearances and goals

Carlos Genaro Carbonell Baca (born 28 March 1951) is a retired Peruvian footballer. Nicknamed "Loco", he primarily played for Universitario de Deportes and Sporting Cristal throughout the 1970s and the 1980s, also playing abroad in Mexico for Atlas. He also briefly played for Peru in 1973.

== Club career ==
Carbonell began his career playing for Juan Aurich in which the club would achieve runners-up that very season. In 1972, he would make his debut for Universitario de Deportes as he would play in the 1972 Copa Libertadores finals as well as win the 1974 Torneo Descentralizado, primarily playing with Fernando Cuéllar. He would leave the club in the middle of the club's 1975 season to travel to Mxico to play for Atlas alongside Héctor Chumpitaz. He would return to Peru by 1977 to play for Sporting Cristal as the club would win the 1979 Torneo Descentralizado alongside other players such as Chumpitaz, Alfredo Quesada, Ramón Mifflin, Percy Rojas, Roberto Mosquera and Rubén Toribio Díaz with a majority of these players having also previously played for Universitario.

After playing in the 1980 Copa Libertadores, he would play for ADT de Tarma for the rest of the season as the team was given the nickname of "La barredora". In 1981, he would return to play for Universitario in which he would play in a friendly against Boca Juniors that included Diego Maradona amongst the players. He then returned to ADT the following season and later playing for Sport Boys. He spent the last two years of his career with Los Espartanos where he played with Hugo Sotil before retiring in 1985.

== International career ==
Carbonell made his only international appearance during the 1974 FIFA World Cup qualifiers. He would form a part of the Peruvian defense alongside José Navarro, Orlando de la Torre and Chumpitaz during the final playoff match in Montevideo where Los Incas would be eliminated 2–1, narrowly avoiding qualification for the tournament.
