= Eduardo Wolf =

Peruvian footballer (born 1952)

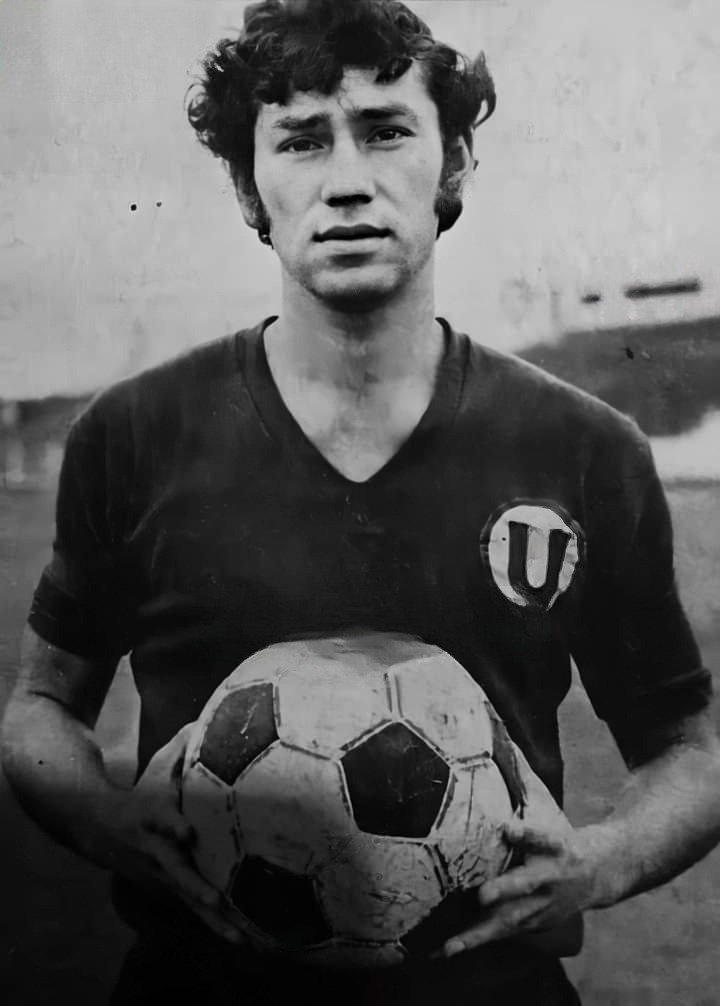
- Wolf in 1973

Personal information
- Full name: Eduardo Wolf Gaona
- Date of birth: 2 July 1952 (age 74)
- Place of birth: Magdalena del Mar, Lima, Peru
- Height: 1.75 m (5 ft 9 in)
- Position: Midfielder

Youth career
- 1967–1969: Universitario de Deportes

Senior career*
Years	Team	Apps	(Gls)
1970–1975	Universitario de Deportes		
1975	San Antonio Thunder		
1976–1977	Team Hawaii		
1977–1984	Tulsa Roughnecks		
1985	Deportivo Municipal		
- * Club domestic league appearances and goals

Eduardo Wolf Gaona (born 2 July 1952) is a Peruvian retired footballer. Throughout the 1970s, he played as a midfielder for Universitario de Deportes in the Peruvian Primera División and San Antonio Thunder and the Tulsa Roughnecks in the North American Soccer League.

== Club career ==
Wolf began his career within the youth sector of Universitario de Deportes beginning in 1967. Before his senior debut in 1970, he was a part of the same squad that had won the national youth championship alongside Juan Carlos Oblitas. During the 1970 Torneo Descentralizado, he would play in the opening game alongside other players such as Ricardo Valderrama Corzo, Luis La Fuente, Fernando Cuéllar, Julio Luna Portal, Eleazar Soria, Carlos Jurado, Víctor Calatayud, Ángel Uribe, Percy Rojas and Juan José Muñante with the match ending in a 2–1 victory and the club going on to be runners-up. In the 1971 Torneo Descentralizado, he would be a part of the winning squad and would subsequently play in the 1972 Copa Libertadores where the club would achieve the milestone of being the only Peruvian club to reach the finals of the tournament.

Following several years in Universitario de Deportes, he would travel abroad to the United States to play for San Antonio Thunder beginning in 1975. Following the team's relocation, he would continue to play with Team Hawaii until 1977 when he then played for the Tulsa Roughnecks where he would play with English footballer Bobby Moore until the club's final season in 1984 and retired with Deportivo Municipal in 1985.
