= Julio Aparicio =

Peruvian footballer (born 1955)

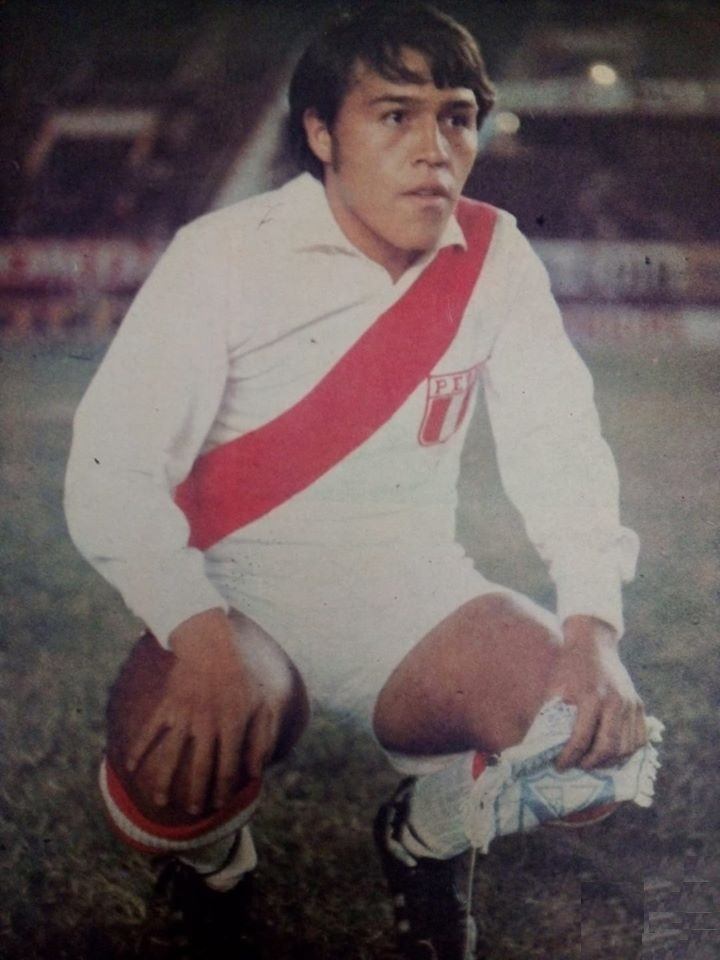

Personal information
- Date of birth: 30 January 1955 (age 71)
- Place of birth: Arequipa, Department of Arequipa, Peru
- Position: Forward

Senior career*
Years	Team	Apps	(Gls)
1973	Sportivo Huracán		
1974–1977	Universitario		
1978–1979	Sporting Cristal		
1980	Bonita Banana		

International career
1975–1977	Peru	6	(0)
- * Club domestic league appearances and goals

Julio Aparicio (born 30 January 1955) is a former Peruvian international striker best known for winning multiple Peruvian national titles and the 1975 Copa America competition.

== Club career ==
He won the Peruvian Premier Division with his club, Club Universitario de Deportes, in 1974. He later participated in the 1975 Copa Libertadores competition, where Universitario reached the semi-final group stage.

In 1978, Aparicio transferred from Universitario to Sporting Cristal, where he would later participate in their 1978 Copa Libertadores campaign. They were eliminated in the group stage, and Aparicio scored the only goal in a 1–4 defeat away game with the club Alianza Lima. He won the Peruvian national championship in 1979 and 1980 whilst a player with Sporting Cristal.

== Achievements ==
Universitario

- Peruvian Primera División: 1974

Sporting Cristal

- Peruvian Primera División: 1979

== International career ==
He made his debut for Peru on 22 June 1975, and his final game came on 17 July 1977. In total, Apararicio played six games for his country. During this time, he was involved in the 1975 Copa America tournament, which Peru won for the second time in its history. In 1977, he took part in the qualifying campaign for the 1978 FIFA World Cup, playing in a 5–0 victory over Bolivia.
