= Manuel Mellán =

Peruvian footballer (born 1945)

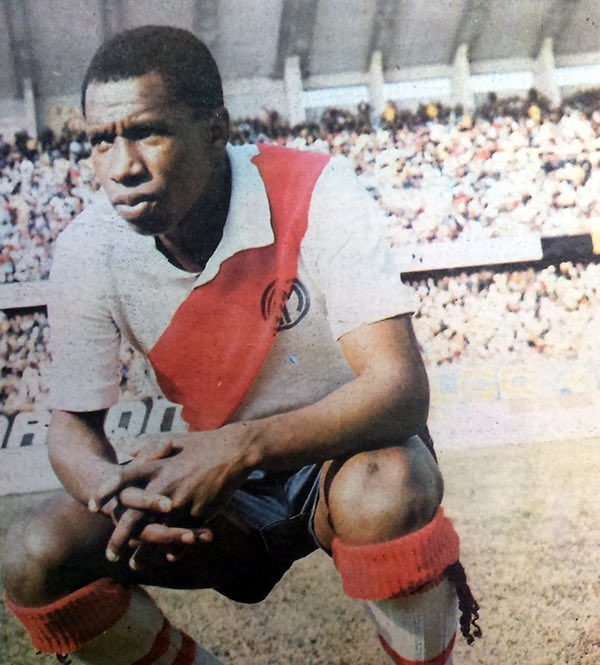

Personal information
- Full name: Manuel Adrián Mellán Heredia
- Date of birth: 12 September 1945 (age 81)
- Place of birth: Pisco, Ica, Peru
- Height: 1.70 m (5 ft 7 in)
- Position: Forward

Senior career*
Years	Team	Apps	(Gls)
1964	Deportivo Olímpico		
1967–1968	Mariscal Sucre		(10)
1969	Juan Aurich	16	(2)
1970	Octavio Espinosa		
1970–1974	Deportivo Municipal		
1975	Juan Aurich		
1976–1977	Atlético Chalaco		
1978	Deportivo Municipal		
1979	Atlético Chalaco		
- * Club domestic league appearances and goals

Manuel Adrián Mellán Heredia (born 12 September 1945) is a Peruvian retired footballer. Nicknamed "Mane", he played as a forward for various Peruvian clubs throughout the 1970s as he was commonly known for playing for Deportivo Municipal and Atlético Chalaco.

== Career ==
Following his move from Pisco to Lima at the age of 9, he would play football in La Victoria District where Hugo Sotil would also play at growing up. He began his senior career with Atlético Deportivo Olímpico for the 1964 season where he would score many goals and make many notable performances. Following several brief stints for several clubs for the next three years, his uncle Cornelio Heredia would recommend him to play for Mariscal Sucre and despite making relatively few appearances for the club, it would be enough for him to score 10 goals by the 1968 Torneo Descentralizado but his contributions could not prevent the club from being relegated from the top flight of Peruvian football.

He would then be picked up by Juan Aurich for the 1969 Torneo Descentralizado as he would play sixteen matches and score two goals over the course of the season. Following a brief spell with Octavio Espinosa for the 1970 Torneo Descentralizado, he would be signed up to play for Deportivo Municipal. During the course of the next four years with the club, he would make 140 appearances and score 67 goals as he would become a famous icon for the club throughout the 1970s due to his historical goal count. Despite being give various offers to travel to play for countries based in neighboring countries Ecuador and Colombia, he chose to stay in Peru, playing for Juan Aurich once more for the 1975 Torneo Descentralizado, performing well throughout his brief tenure. In the 1976 Torneo Descentralizado, he would then play for Atlético Chalaco where he would experience one of his best seasons with 24 goals. Following another season with the Callao-based club, he would return to play for Deportivo Municipal for the 1978 Torneo Descentralizado but wouldn't enjoy the same success as his prior tenure as he was no longer within the starting XI for the club. He chose to spend his final season with Atlético Chalaco for the 1979 Torneo Descentralizado due to his age and would retire by the end of the season.

== Personal life ==
Manuel is the younger brother of fellow footballer Fernando Mellán who primarily played for Sporting Cristal as a defender. He is also the nephew of Cornelio Heredia who played for Peru throughout the 1940s and the 1950s. He currently teaches as an instructor within the youth sector of Deportivo Municipal, notably coaching Adrián Ascues. Following the death of teammate and club legend Hugo Sotil, Mellán would participate in a posthumous ceremony dedicated to him alongside other players of his generation including Héctor Chumpitaz, Luis La Fuente, Eusebio Acasuzo and José Velásquez.
