= Víctor Calatayud =

Peruvian footballer (born 1952)

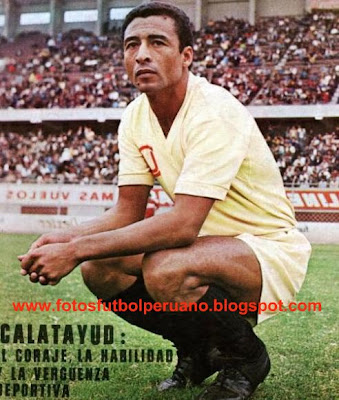

Personal information
- Full name: José Eusebio Víctor Calatayud Figueroa
- Date of birth: 16 December 1941 (age 84)
- Place of birth: Carmen de la Legua, Callao, Peru
- Height: 1.65 m (5 ft 5 in)
- Position: Forward

Senior career*
Years	Team	Apps	(Gls)
1962	Porvenir Miraflores		
1963	Mariscal Sucre		
1964–1973	Universitario de Deportes		
1974	Walter Ormeño		
1975–1977	Defensor Lima		

International career
1965–1967	Peru	6	(0)
- * Club domestic league appearances and goals

José Eusebio Víctor Calatayud Figueroa (born 16 December 1941) is a Peruvian retired footballer. Nicknamed "Puñalada" and "Calato", he was known for playing for Universitario de Deportes as a forward throughout the 1960s and early 1970s, being a part of the squad to win the 1971 Torneo Descentralizado and play in the 1972 Copa Libertadores finals.

== Club career ==
Calatayud was born on 16 December 1941 in Carmen de la Legua, Callao. He would begin his career by having short spells for Porvenir Miraflores and Mariscal Sucre prior to his signing for Universitario de Deportes. He was defined by being skilled as a forward with his characterization being defined with his speed and initiative on field. He was also known for his strategy to play from the back and pass it to the center field where he would do so with other players such as Alejandro Guzmán, Enrique Casaretto, Percy Rojas and Ángel Uribe for opportunities to score goals. This would lead to Calatayud earning the nickname "Puñalada" from reporter Pocho Rospigliosi. He would also play in any sector of the field for both defensive and offensive plays.

Arriving in 1964 at the age of 21, he would begin to play for the club and would go on to win the 1964 Peruvian Primera División. He would oversee the club win various titles within the tournament including the 1966, 1967, 1969 and the 1971 editions of the tournament. He was known as being one of the most distinguished players of the 1960s, playing alongside other players such as Ángel Uribe, Enrique Rodríguez Piña, Héctor Chumpitaz, Roberto Chale and Luis Cruzado. He would also play in various editions of the Copa Libertadores with the most notable run was where he would reach the finals of the 1972 edition.

Following this, he would play for Walter Ormeño in 1974 and Defensor Lima from 1975 to 1977 before retiring.

== International career ==
He would make his international debut in the 1965 Copa del Pacífico in a 4–1 loss to Chile. He would play in seven matches in two years with his final match being in a friendly against Japan in 1967.
