= Percy Vílchez =

Peruvian footballer (born 1952)

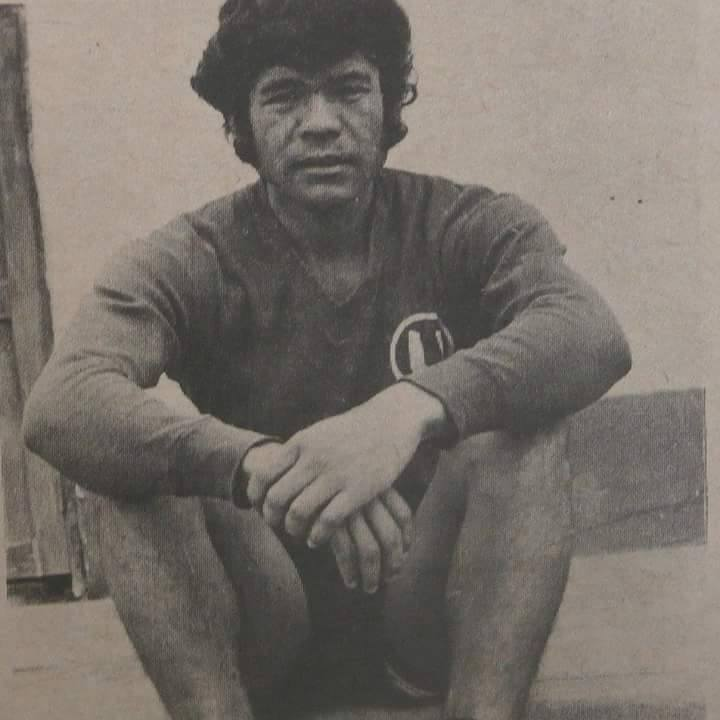
- Vílchez playing for Universitario de Deportes

Personal information
- Full name: Percy Vílchez Pantoja
- Date of birth: 15 December 1952 (age 73)
- Place of birth: Salaverry, La libertad, Peru
- Height: 1.77 m (5 ft 10 in)
- Position: Forward

Youth career
- Colegio Nacional San José de Chiclayo

Senior career*
| Years | Team | Apps | (Gls) |
| 1969–1970 | Juan Aurich | | |
| 1971–1974 | Universitario de Deportes | | |
| 1974 | Atlético Chalaco | | |
| 1975 | Valencia Fútbol Club | | |
| 1975–1977 | Tiburones Rojos | | |
| 1977–1982 | Universitario de Deportes | | |
| 1983 | Juan Aurich | | |

International career
| 1972 | Peru | | |
- * Club domestic league appearances and goals

Percy Vílchez Pantoja (born 15 December 1952) is a retired Peruvian football player that played as a forward. Nicknamed "Chino", he was part of the squad of Universitario de Deportes during the early 1970s, known for being a major contribution to the team playing in the 1972 Copa Libertadores finals. He also played for Peru in the Brazil Independence Cup but didn't travel with the rest of the team.

== Early life ==
As a child, Vílchez was described as having lung complications by his doctors, and a possible infection with tuberculosis. With his medic recommending more activity in his life, living near the beach, Vílchez had a daily routine of waking up at five in the morning and went on morning runs.

== Club career ==
In his youth career, he played for Colegio Nacional San José de Chiclayo. Vílchez had to decide to play for either Alfonso Ugarte de Chiclín, Carlos A. Mannucci or Juan Aurich with his final choice being the latter. Starting in the 1971 season, he played for Universitario de Deportes with his preliminary match having scored 5 goals against Alianza Atlético at Chiclayo and travelled with the team to Lima on the same day.

During the 1972 Copa Libertadores he scored several goals against various clubs, contributing to the team reaching the 1972 Copa Libertadores finals. His most famous goal of the tournament was in the match against Nacional where he "danced" against goalkeeper Manga, scoring three goals in the match. As a result of this match, several clubs such as Nacional of Uruguay and Botafogo of Brazil made offers to Vílchez for his transfer. Instead, he chose to remain in Universitario for two more years before transferring to Atlético Chalaco for the 1974 season and to Valencia in Venezuela for the first half of the 1975 season. Due to the many plays and experience he had made, Tiburones Rojos de Veracruz showed interest in Vílchez and signed him up until the 1977 season.

Vílchez returned to play for Universitario de Deportes for the remainder of the 1977 season all the way to the 1982 season, notably scoring against Palmeiras during the 1979 Copa Libertadores. In 1982, while playing in a match against Alianza Lima, he found himself attempting to make a goal against Alianza goalkeeper José González Ganoza when defender Tomás Farfán sprained his right leg, causing Vílchez to be unable to play for the remainder of the match. He retired a year later for the 1983 season for Juan Aurich.

== International career ==
Unlike many Peruvian players of the 1970s generation, Vílchez didn't make his official debut with Peru, appearing only in preliminary rosters but not playing any matches with a notable instance of this being listed for the Peruvian roster of the Brazil Independence Cup but not travelling with the rest of the team.
