= Hernán Castañeda =

Peruvian footballer (born 1945)

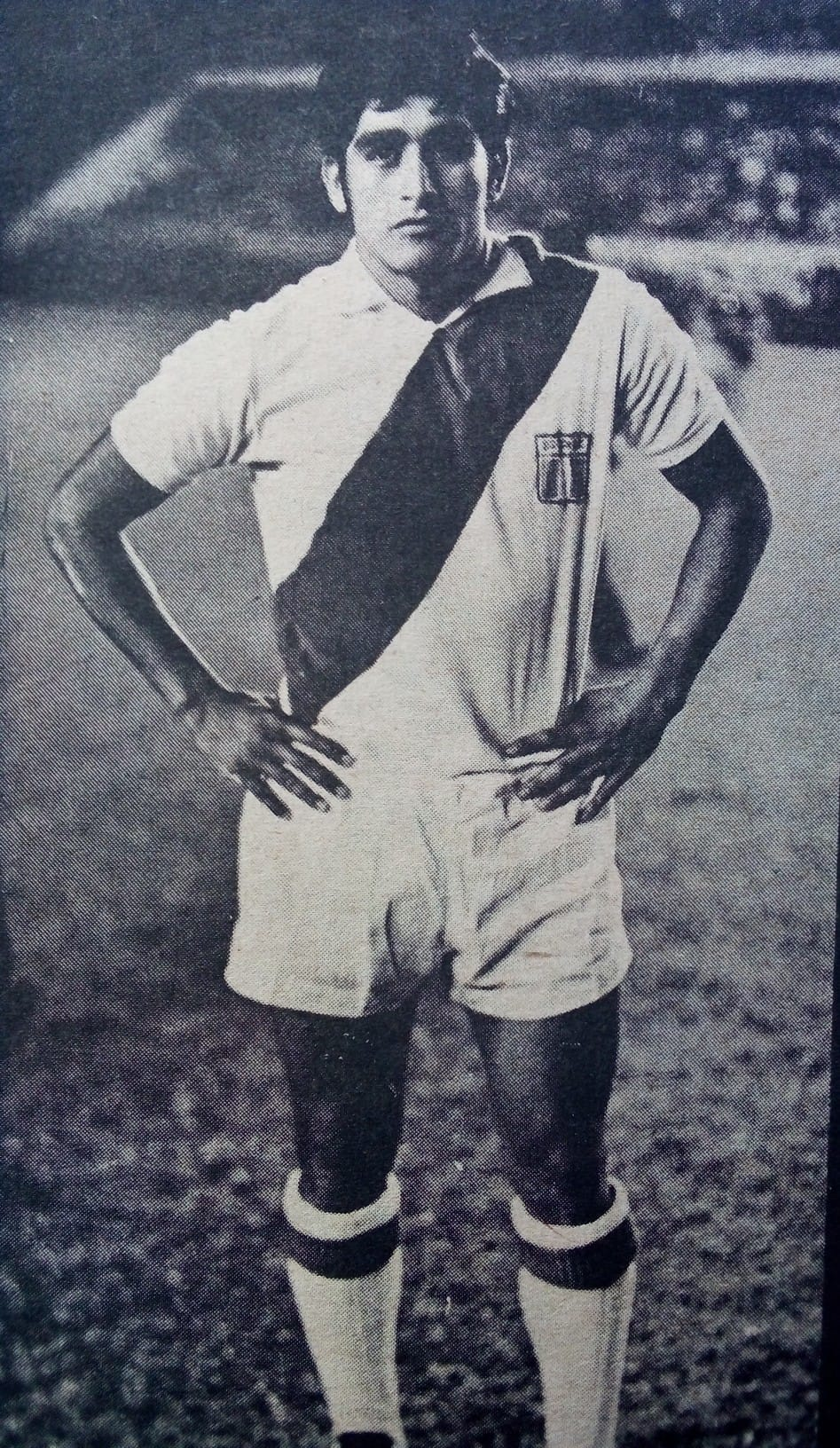
- Castañeda playing for Peru

Personal information
- Date of birth: 5 August 1945 (age 81)
- Place of birth: Chiclayo, Lambayeque, Peru
- Height: 1.75 m (5 ft 9 in)
- Position: Central midfielder

Youth career
- 1959–1962: Los Caimanes

Senior career*
Years	Team	Apps	(Gls)
1962–1969	Juan Aurich		
1969–1972	Universitario de Deportes		
1973–1975	Sport Boys		
1976–1977	Defensor Lima		
1978–1981	Universitario de Deportes		

International career
1969–1972	Peru	11	(2)
- * Club domestic league appearances and goals

Hernán Ángel Castañeda Montalvo (born 5 August 1945) is a Peruvian former footballer. Nicknamed Cachorro, he played as a central midfielder who participated in the Brazil Independence Cup.

== Club career ==
Castañeda began his career at the age of 14 within the recently founded Los Caimanes and would play there until 1962. For the next seven years, he played in Juan Aurich until he began playing for Universitario de Deportes where he would participate in the 1972 Copa Libertadores finals. In 1973, he was transferred to Sport Boys and at Defensor Lima in 1976. Later in 1978, he returned to play in Universitario de Deportes until his retirement in 1981.

== International career ==
He played for the Peru national football team in 11 appointments and would score two goals. He made his debut on 14 May 1969 in a friendly against El Salvador which ended in a 4–1 victory for the Peruvians. During their match against Bolivia, Castañeda would score the second goal.

== Personal life ==
Castañeda was born on 5 August 1945 at Chiclayo, Lambayeque as the second son of Esteban Castañeda and Dora Antonieta Montalvo. He has two children, Claudia Cecilia and Hernán Eduardo Castañeda.
