= Rubén Techera =

Uruguayan footballer (born 1946)

Personal information
- Full name: Rubén Héctor Techera González
- Date of birth: 12 December 1946 (age 79)
- Place of birth: Montevideo, Uruguay
- Position: Midfielder

International career
Years	Team	Apps	(Gls)
1967	Uruguay	3	(0)

Rubén Techera (born 12 December 1946) is a Uruguayan footballer. He played in three matches for the Uruguay national football team in 1967. He was also part of Uruguay's squad for the 1967 South American Championship.
