= Horacio Ballesteros =

Argentine footballer (1944–2024)

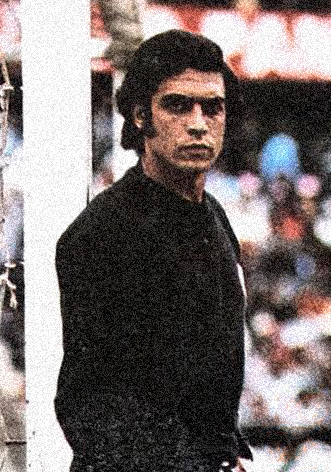
- Ballesteros playing for Universitario de Deportes

Personal information
- Full name: Humberto Horacio Ballesteros Hernández
- Date of birth: 8 May 1944
- Place of birth: Pontevedra, Buenos Aires Province, Argentina
- Date of death: 24 June 2024 (aged 80)
- Height: 1.82 m (6 ft 0 in)
- Position: Goalkeeper

Youth career
- 1961–66: River Plate

Senior career*
Years	Team	Apps	(Gls)
1966	River Plate	2	(0)
1967–1970	Lanús	95	(0)
1971–1974	Universitario		
1975–1976	Millonarios		
1977	Atlético Chalaco		
1978–1981	Sport Boys		
1982	Deportivo Municipal		
- * Club domestic league appearances and goals

Humberto Horacio Ballesteros Hernández (8 May 1944 – 24 June 2024) was an Argentine professional footballer who played as a goalkeeper. Ballesteros died on 24 June 2024, at the age of 80.
