= Estadio Teodoro Lolo Fernández =

Stadium in Lima, Peru

Coordinates: 12.0489°S 77.0474°W

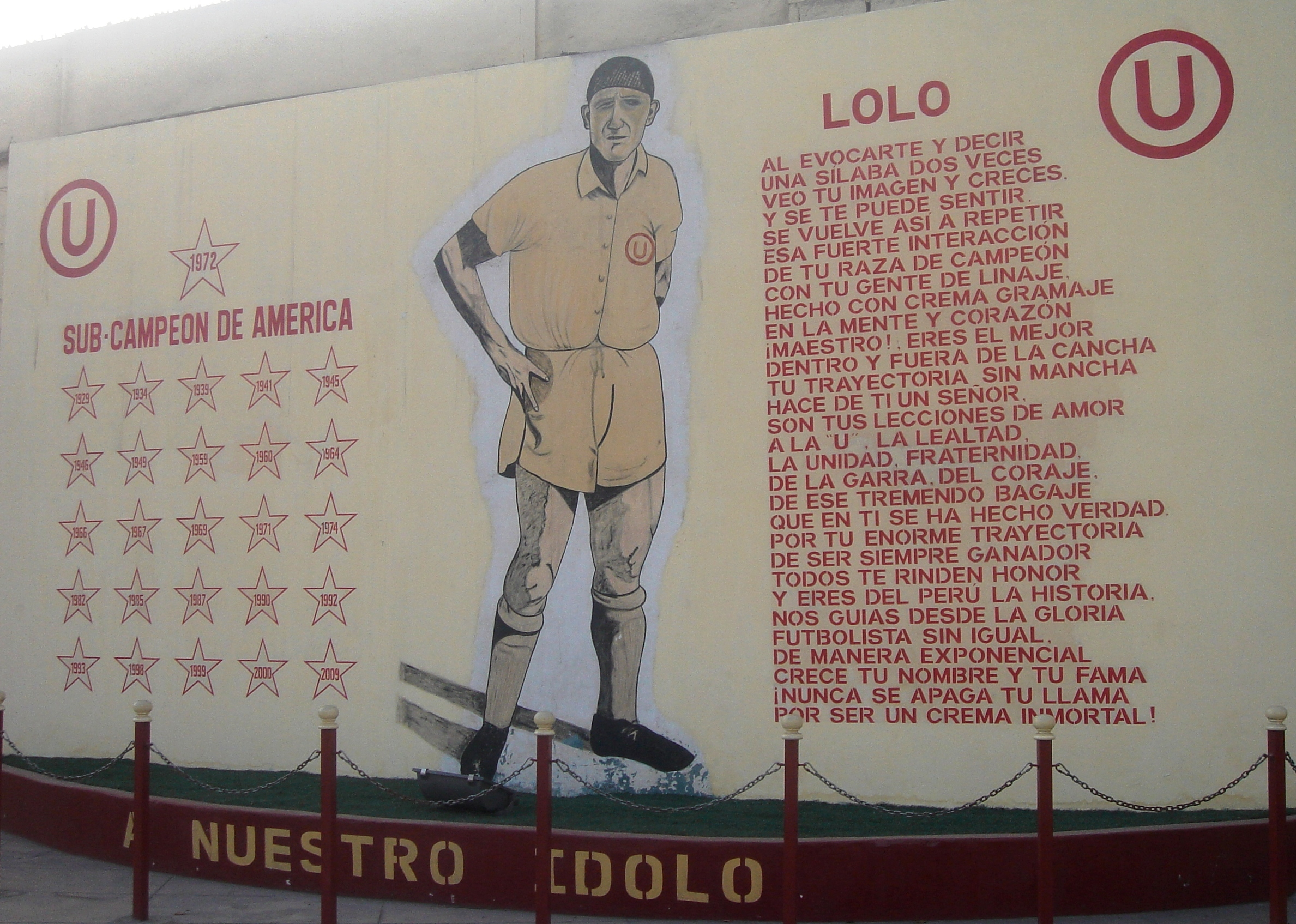
- Interactive map of Estadio Teodoro Lolo Fernández
- Full name: Estadio Teodoro Lolo Fernández
- Location: Breña, Lima, Peru
- Owner: Universitario de Deportes
- Operator: Universitario de Deportes
- Capacity: 15,000(1967–2000); 4,000 (2000 -)(football)
- Surface: Grass

Construction
- Groundbreaking: December 19, 1944
- Built: 1950 - 1952
- Opened: July 20, 1952
- Architect: Luis de Souza Ferreira Hubi
- Project manager: Carlos Cilloniz Oberti

Tenant
- Universitario de Deportes

Estadio Teodoro Lolo Fernández is a stadium in Lima, Peru, built in the early 1950s and opened on July 20, 1952. It is owned by the football club Universitario de Deportes, being their first stadium; one stand in the west for 4,000 spectators brought from the Estadio Nacional.

The inauguration game saw Universitario play Universidad de Chile where they won 4-2; Lolo Fernández scored three goals. Universitario then bought a stand from the Peruvian Basketball Federation which served as the northern stand; capacity of 5,000 spectators. They finally built the eastern stand for a capacity of 6,000 spectators. This reached a maximum capacity of 15,000. However the Estadio Lolo Fernández was not used for more important games. The club chose to move those high-risk games to the Estadio Nacional which, at the time, had a capacity of 48,000.

In 2000, the Estadio Lolo Fernández was replaced as the main venue for Universitario's First Division football games by the newer Estadio Monumental "U" which has a capacity of 80,093 seats. Afterwards, the eastern and southern stands of Estadio Lolo Fernández were removed.

The Estadio Lolo Fernández now serves as a football academy for the club's members and hosts games for the youth teams such as América Cochahuayco which currently participates in Peru's Second Division league. The only stand left in the stadium is the western one known as Occidente. The current capacity is now 4,000 seats. In June 2009, work started to replace the natural grass soccer turf with FIFA 2 Star grade synthetic grass.
