= Julio Luna (footballer) =

Peruvian footballer (born 1950)

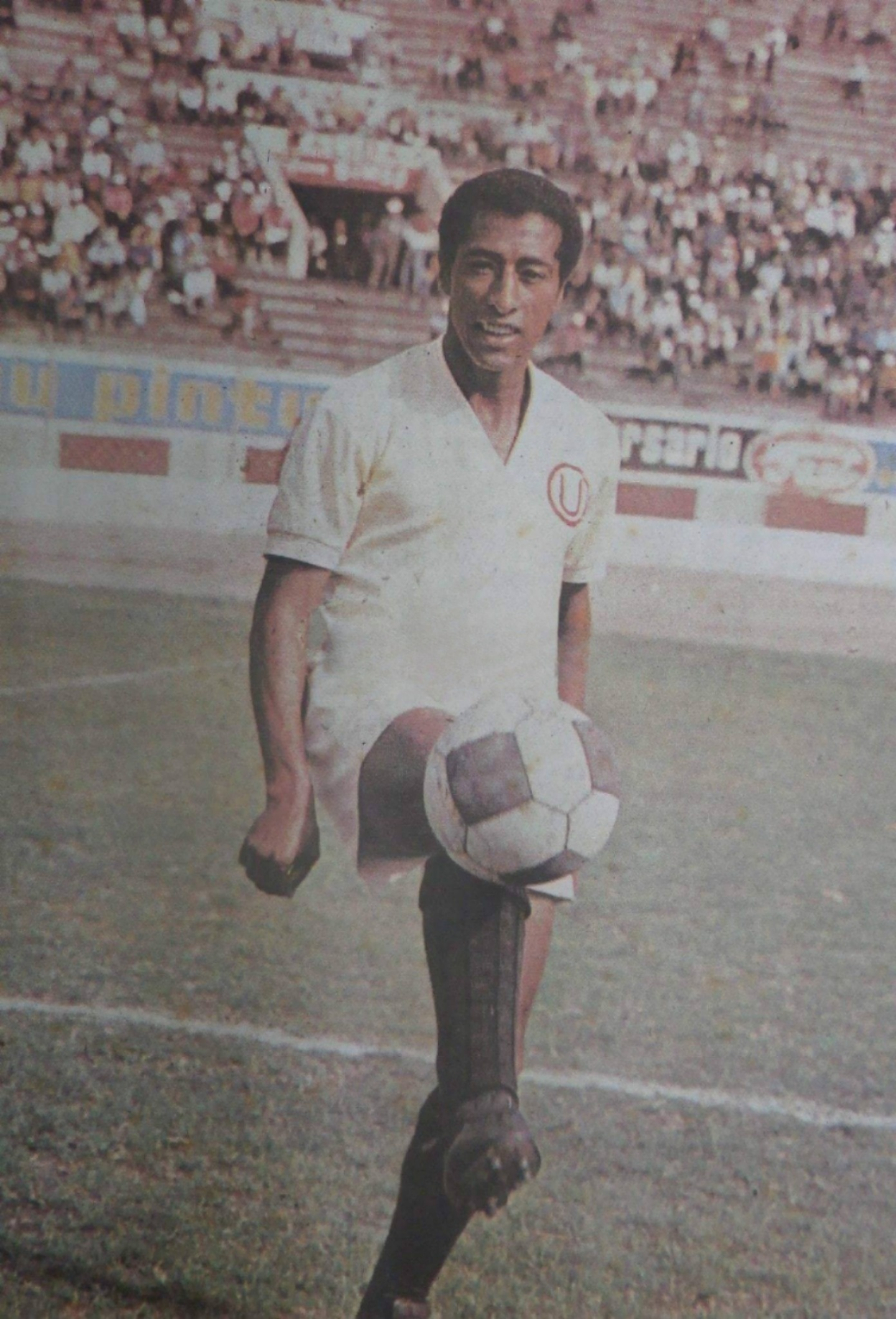
- Luna in 1972

Personal information
- Full name: Julio César Luna Portal
- Date of birth: 20 December 1950 (age 75)
- Place of birth: Lima, Department of Lima, Peru
- Position: Defender

Senior career*
Years	Team	Apps	(Gls)
1969–1973	Universitario de Deportes	25	
1974–1975	Deportivo Municipal		
1976–1980	Atlético Chalaco		

International career
1972–1973	Peru	11	(0)
- * Club domestic league appearances and goals

Julio César Luna Portal (born 20 December 1950), nicknamed Loco, is a Peruvian former footballer who played as a defender and played in the Brazil Independence Cup.

== Club career ==
Luna began his career in 1969 with Universitario de Deportes until 1973 and would play in twenty-five matches with two of them being during the 1972 Copa Libertadores finals. In the 1974–1975 season, he played for Deportivo Municipal and later with Atlético Chalaco between 1976 and 1980, participating in the 1980 Copa Libertadores.

== International career ==
Luna briefly played in the Peru national football team with 11 appearances along with playing in the Brazil Independence Cup. His debut would be on 6 June 1972 in a friendly against Colombia which would end in a draw and his last match would be on 13 May 1973, after Peru lost in its second match against Chile during the 1974 FIFA World Cup Qualifiers.
