= Oswaldo Ramírez =

Peruvian footballer (born 1947)

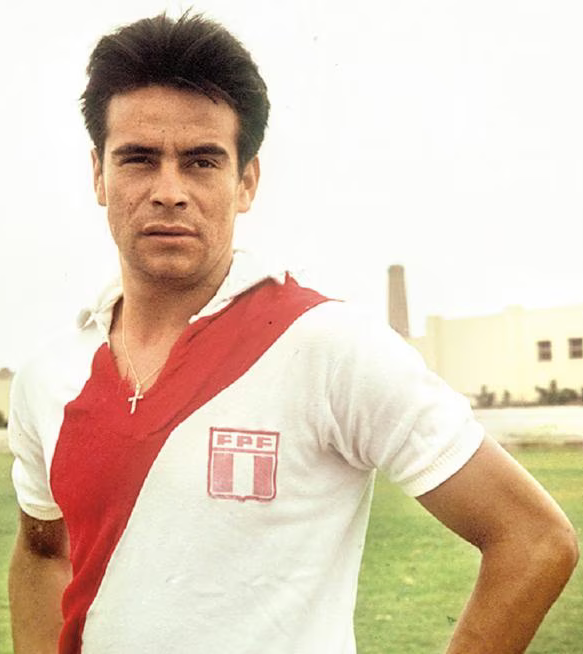

Personal information
- Full name: Oswaldo Felipe Ramírez Salcedo
- Date of birth: March 28, 1947 (age 79)
- Place of birth: Callao, Peru
- Height: 1.78 m (5 ft 10 in)
- Position: Striker

Senior career*
Years	Team	Apps	(Gls)
1966–1969	Sport Boys	92	(50)
1970–1975	Universitario	131	(80)
1975–1977	Atletico Espanol	47	(12)
1977–1980	Sporting Cristal	72	(37)
1980–1981	Deportivo Galicia	?	(?)
1981–1982	Sporting Cristal	57	(27)

International career
1969–1982	Peru	57	(17)
Medal record
Men's football
Representing Peru
Copa América
Winner	1975
- * Club domestic league appearances and goals as of June 2007

Oswaldo Felipe Ramírez Salcedo (born March 28, 1947, in Lima, Callao) is a retired Peruvian football striker. He is one of the highest scoring players in the history of the Copa Libertadores and on the Peru national football team, which won the 1975 Copa América.

== Club career ==
Ramírez started his career with Sport Boys in 1966. In 1968, he was the top scorer in the Peruana Primera División.

In 1969, Oswaldo "Cachito" Ramirez scored two historic goals against Argentina in the Bombonera (Argentina). This allowed Peru to compete in the 1970 Mexico World Cup and eliminated Argentina from the competition.

In 1970, he joined Universitario de Deportes and won the league title in 1971 and 1974.

From 1975 to 1977, he played for Atlético Espanol (Mexico).

In 1977, Ramírez returned to Peru to play for Sporting Cristal and won the Peruana Primera División championship in 1979 and 1980, being top scorer in 1980.

A short spell with Deportivo Galicia (Venezuela), was followed by Ramírez's return to Sporting Cristal. He then retired in 1982.

Ramírez scored a total of 26 goals in the Copa Libertadores making him the 8th highest scoring player overall and the highest scoring Peruvian in the history of the tournament.

=== Club titles ===
Season	Club	Title
1971	(Peru) Universitario	Peruvian Primera División
1974	(Peru) Universitario	Peruvian Primera División
1975	(Mexico) Atlético Español	CONCACAF Champions Cup
1979	(Peru) Sporting Cristal	Peruvian Primera División
1980	(Peru) Sporting Cristal	Peruvian Primera División
1981	(Venezuela) Deportivo Galicia	Copa Venezuela

=== Individual awards ===
- Peruvian Primera División: Top Scorer 1968, 1980
- Copa Libertadores: Top Scorer 1972, 1975

== International career ==
Ramírez played a total of 57 games for Peru, scoring a total of 17 goals, representing them at the 1970 FIFA World Cup and won the 1975 Copa América.

Ramírez's 17 goals for Peru made him the 10th highest scorer in the history of the Peru national football team.

=== International title ===
Season	Club	Title
1975	Peru	Copa América

=== International goals ===
Scores and results list Peru's goal tally first, score column indicates score after each Ramírez goal.

List of international goals scored by Oswaldo Ramírez
No.	Date	Venue	Opponent	Score	Result	Competition
1	9 May 1969	Bogotá, Colombia	Colombia	1–1	3–1	Friendly
2	14 May 1969	San Salvador, El Salvador	El Salvador	2–1	4–1	Friendly
3	14 May 1969	San Salvador, El Salvador	El Salvador	4–1	4–1	Friendly
4	31 August 1969	La Bombonera, Buenos Aires, Argentina	Argentina	1–0	2–2	1970 FIFA World Cup qualification
5	31 August 1969	La Bombonera, Buenos Aires, Argentina	Argentina	2–0	2–2	1970 FIFA World Cup qualification
6	18 June 1972	Vivaldão, Manaus, Brazil	Venezuela	1–0	1–0	Brazil Independence Cup
7	25 June 1972	Vivaldão, Manaus, Brazil	Yugoslavia	1–2	1–2	Brazil Independence Cup
8	23 April 1973	Estadio Nacional, Lima, Peru	Panama	3–0	4–0	Friendly
9	1 July 1973	Estadio Nacional, Lima, Peru	Colombia	3–0	3–1	Friendly
10	10 July 1975	Lima, Peru	Paraguay	1–0	2–0	Friendly
11	10 July 1975	Lima, Peru	Paraguay	2–0	2–0	Friendly
12	27 July 1975	Estadio Jesús Bermúdez, Oruro, Bolivia	Bolivia	1–0	1–0	1975 Copa América
13	7 August 1975	Estadio Nacional, Lima, Peru	Bolivia	1–0	3–1	1975 Copa América
14	22 October 1975	Estadio Nacional, Lima, Peru	Colombia	2–0	2–0	1975 Copa América
15	17 May 1977	Estadio Azteca, Mexico City, Mexico	Mexico	1–1	1–1	Friendly
16	29 May 1977	Port-au-Prince, Haiti	Haiti	2–2	2–2	Friendly
17	1 April 1978	Estadio Nacional, Lima, Peru	Bulgaria	1–1	1–1	Friendly
