= Héctor Bailetti =

Peruvian footballer (born 1947)

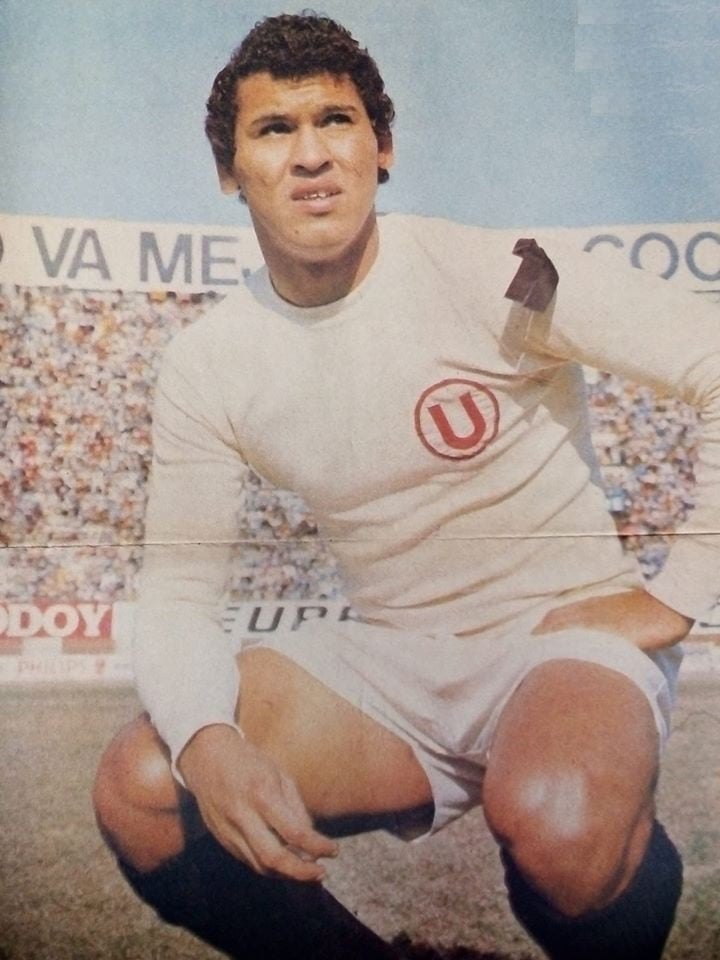
- Bailetti playing for Universitario

Personal information
- Full name: Héctor Alberto Bailetti Córdova
- Date of birth: 27 November 1947 (age 78)
- Place of birth: Chincha Alta, Peru
- Height: 1.78 m (5 ft 10 in)
- Position: Striker

Senior career*
Years	Team	Apps	(Gls)
1966–1967	Porvenir Miraflores		
1968–1972	Universitario		
1973–1974	Defensor Lima		
1975	Boca Juniors	15	(4)
1975–1976	Atlante	29	(4)
1976–1977	Zacatepec	6	(2)
1977–1978	Sporting Cristal		

International career
1968–1973	Peru	18	(5)
- * Club domestic league appearances and goals

Héctor Alberto Bailetti Córdova (born 27 November 1947) is a former Peruvian football striker.

== Career ==
Born in Chincha Alta, Bailetti began playing football with Porvenir Miraflores. He joined Club Universitario de Deportes in 1968, and helped the club to two Peruvian league titles and a runners-up finish in the 1972 Copa Libertadores. He joined Defensor Lima in 1974, helping the club reach the semi-finals of the 1974 Copa Libertadores.

In 1975, Bailetti moved abroad to play for Boca Juniors. He made his Primera División Argentina debut against Racing Club de Avellaneda on 20 March 1975. After a few months with Boca Juniors, Bailetti played for Atlante F.C. and Zacatepec in the Primera División de México.

Bailetti returned to Peru in 1977, finishing his career with Sporting Cristal in 1978.

He made a total of 41 appearances, scoring 15 goals, in the Copa Libertadores.

Bailetti made 18 appearances and scored five goals for the Peru national football team from 1968 to 1973.

List of international goals scored by Héctor Bailetti
No.	Date	Venue	Opponent	Score	Result	Competition	Ref.
1	18 August 1968	National Stadium of Peru, Lima, Peru	Chile	1–2	1–2	Copa del Pacífico	
2	1 July 1973	National Stadium of Peru, Lima, Peru	Colombia	1–0	3–1	Friendly	
3	1 July 1973	National Stadium of Peru, Lima, Peru	Colombia	2–0	3–1	Friendly	
4	27 July 1973	La Bombonera, Buenos Aires, Argentina	Argentina	1–1	1–3	Copa Ramón Castilla	
5	5 August 1973	Estadio Centenario, Montevideo, Uruguay	Chile	1–0	1–2	1974 FIFA World Cup qualification	
