= Juan Carlos Oblitas =

Peruvian footballer and manager (born 1951)

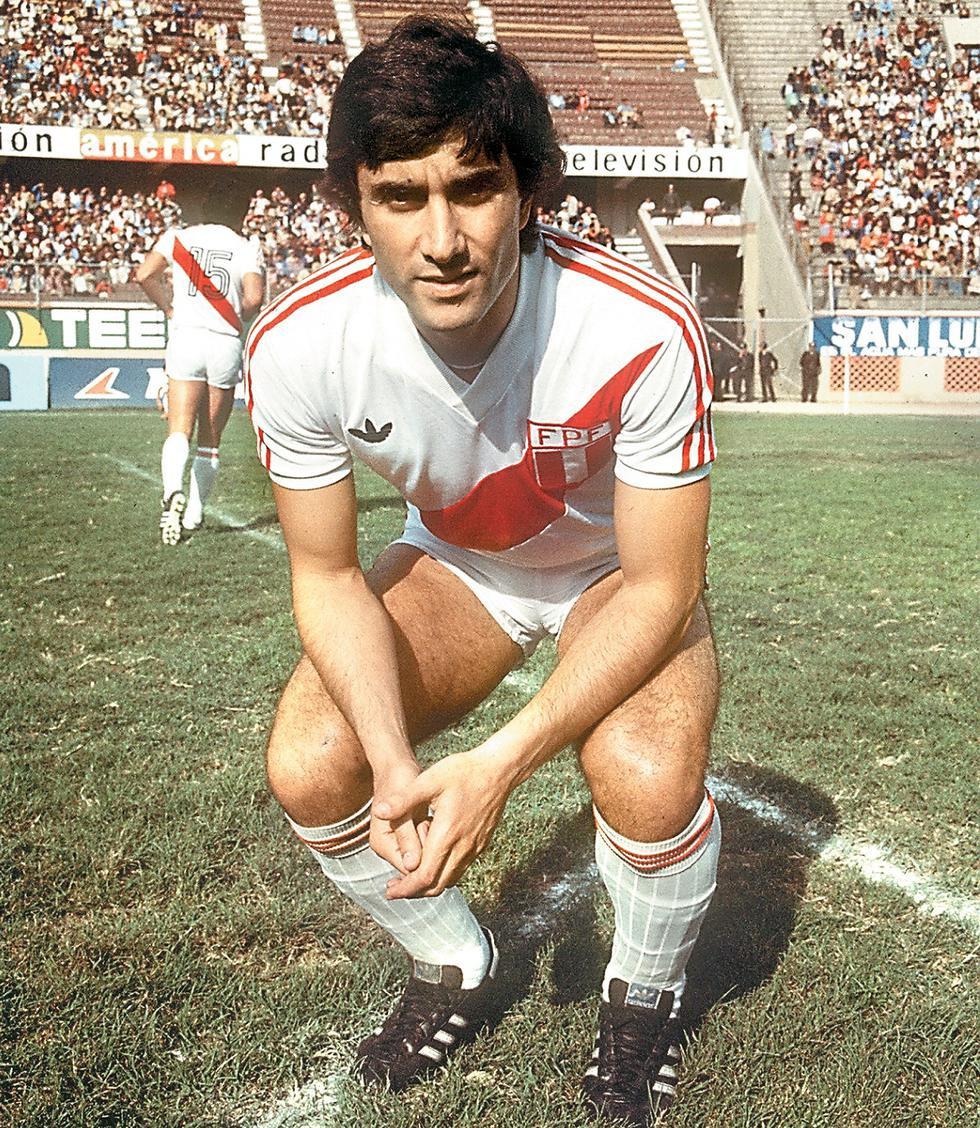
- Oblitas as a Peru national team player

Personal information
- Full name: Juan Carlos Oblitas Saba
- Date of birth: 16 February 1951 (age 75)
- Place of birth: Mollendo, Arequipa, Peru
- Height: 1.76 m (5 ft 9 in)
- Position: Winger

Youth career
- 1967: Universitario

Senior career*
Years	Team	Apps	(Gls)
1968–1975	Universitario		
1975–1976	Elche	1	(0)
1976–1977	Veracruz	59	(10)
1978–1980	Sporting Cristal		
1981–1984	Sérésien	84	(15)
1984–1985	Universitario		

International career
1973–1985	Peru	63	(11)

Managerial career
- 1987–1990: Universitario
- 1990–1995: Sporting Cristal
- 1996–1999: Peru
- 1999–2001: Sporting Cristal
- 2003: Alajuelense
- 2004: U. San Martín
- 2004–2006: LDU Quito
- 2007–2009: Sporting Cristal
- 2015–2022: Peru (technical director)
Medal record
Men's football
Representing Peru
Copa América
Winner	1975
- * Club domestic league appearances and goals

Juan Carlos Oblitas Saba (16 February 1951) is a Peruvian football manager and former player. He is nicknamed El Ciego ("The Blind One"). He made 63 appearances for the Peru national team, scoring 11 goals.

== Career ==
Juan Carlos Oblitas, el Ciego, was born in Mollendo, Arequipa on 16 February 1951.

As a player, he was a participant at the 1978 and 1982 FIFA World Cups. He obtained 64 international caps with Peru, and won the Copa América 1975. He played at the club level for Universitario and Sporting Cristal in Peru, as well as Elche in Spain, Veracruz in Mexico and R.F.C. Sérésien in Belgium.

As a manager, he won the Primera División Peruana national title with Universitario (1987) and Sporting Cristal (1994, 1995), as well as the Campeonato Ecuatoriano de Fútbol with Liga Deportiva Universitaria de Quito (2005). In the period 1996-99 he coached the Peru national football team, missing the 1998 World Cup finals on goal difference.

After Manuel Burga resigned following a long period of criticism, the new FPF leadership of Edwin Oviedo appointed him as technical director for the national team. There, in January 2017, he helped the new FPF leadership to design the "Minors Plan" project, with the aim to improve the youth football of Peru which has been weaker than most of other CONMEBOL nations, in order to rebuild and reform football development in Peru for the future. He also aimed to make Peru one of major youth football power in South America, hoping to achieve more frequent qualification to the FIFA U-17 and FIFA U-20 World Cups. He also helped designing the Centennial Plan 2022, with its goal is to achieve more World Cup qualification successes, and making the Peruvian youth league one of South America's strongest, as well as the construction of new FPF Academy, the Center of National Teams.

== Career statistics ==
Appearances and goals by national team and year
National team	Year	Apps	Goals
Peru	1973	3	0
Peru	1975	13	4
Peru	1977	11	4
Peru	1978	11	1
Peru	1981	4	0
Peru	1982	5	1
Peru	1984	2	0
Peru	1985	14	1
Total		63	11

Scores and results table. Peru's goal tally first:

List of international goals scored by Juan Carlos Oblitas
No.	Date	Venue	Opponent	Score	Result	Competition
1	01 July 1975	Lima, Peru	Ecuador	1–0	2–0	Friendly
2	07 August 1975	Estadio Nacional, Lima, Peru	Bolivia	3–0	3–1	1975 Copa América
3	20 August 1975	Estadio Alejandro Villanueva, Lima, Peru	Chile	2–0	3–1	1975 Copa América
4	22 October 1975	Estadio Nacional, Lima, Peru	Colombia	1–0	2–0	1975 Copa América
5	20 February 1977	Estadio Olímpico Atahualpa, Quito, Ecuador	Ecuador	1–0	1–1	1978 FIFA World Cup qualification
6	12 March 1977	Estadio Nacional, Lima, Peru	Ecuador	2–0	4–0	1978 FIFA World Cup qualification
7	12 March 1977	Estadio Nacional, Lima, Peru	Ecuador	3–0	4–0	1978 FIFA World Cup qualification
8	26 March 1977	Estadio Nacional, Lima, Peru	Chile	2–0	2–0	1978 FIFA World Cup qualification
9	23 March 1978	Lima, Peru	Argentina	1–3	1–3	Friendly
10	28 April 1982	Parc des Princes, Paris, France	France	1–0	1–0	Friendly
11	23 June 1985	Estadio Nacional, Lima, Peru	Argentina	1–0	1–0	1986 FIFA World Cup qualification

== Honours ==
=== As a player ===
Universitario de Deportes

- Peruvian League: 1969, 1971, 1974, 1985

Sporting Cristal

- Peruvian League: 1979, 1980

Peru

- Copa América: 1975

=== As a manager ===
Universitario de Deportes

- Peruvian League: 1987

Sporting Cristal

- Peruvian League: 1991, 1994, 1995

Peru

- Kirin Cup: 1999

LDU Quito

- Serie A (Ecuador): 2005
