= Eleazar Soria =

Peruvian footballer (1948–2021)

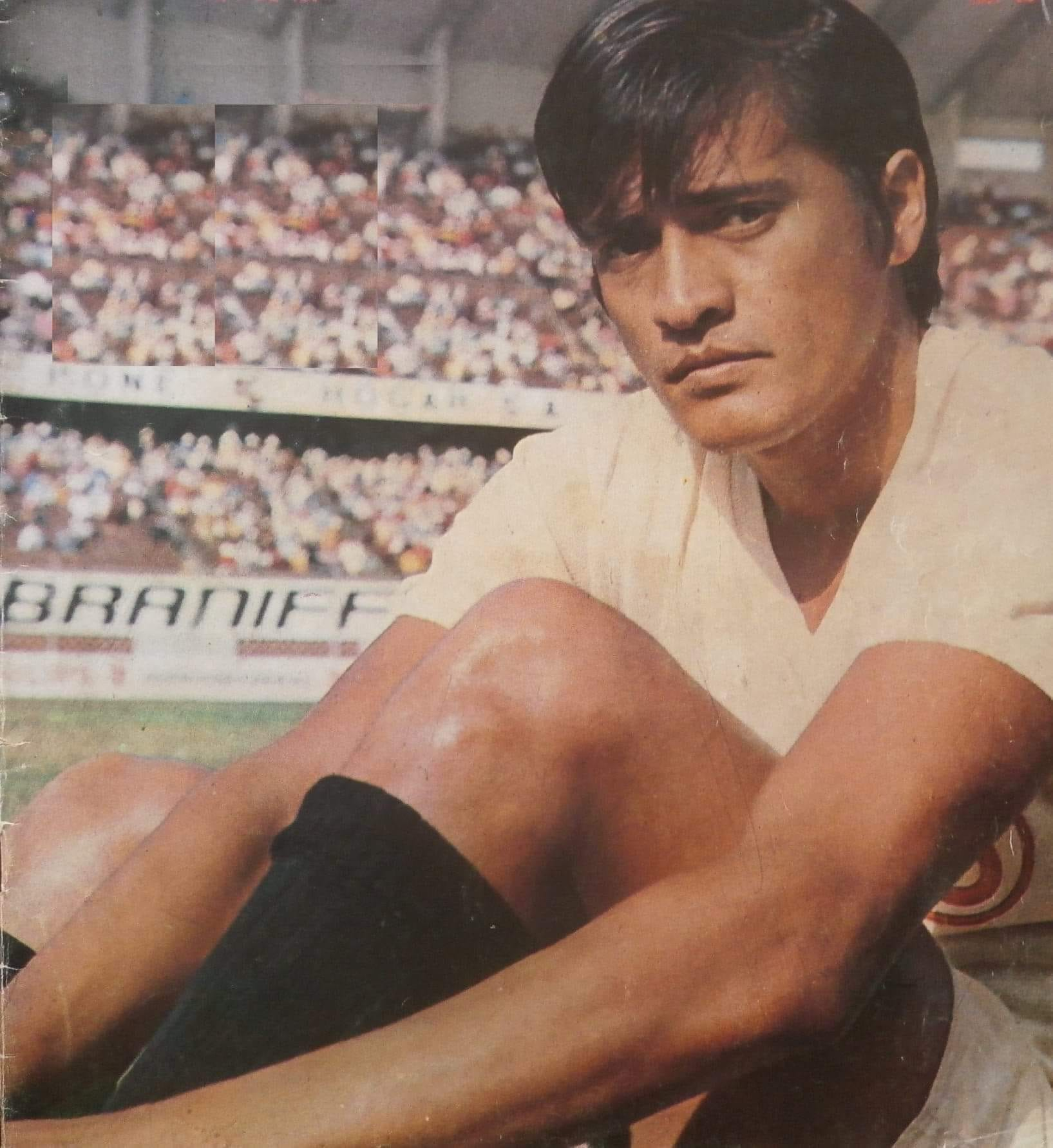
- Soria playing for Universitario de Deportes

Personal information
- Full name: Eleazar José Manuel Alejandro Soria Ibarra
- Date of birth: 11 January 1948
- Place of birth: Lima, Peru
- Date of death: 24 June 2021 (aged 73)
- Place of death: Lima, Peru
- Height: 1.81 m (5 ft 11 in)
- Position: Right-back

Youth career
- Universitario

Senior career*
Years	Team	Apps	(Gls)
1967–1974	Universitario		
1975–1976	Independiente		
1977–1981	Sporting Cristal		

International career
1972–1978	Peru	29	(0)
- * Club domestic league appearances and goals

Eleazar Soria Ibarra (11 January 1948 – 24 June 2021) was a Peruvian professional footballer who played as a right-back.

He won the 1975 Copa America with the Peru national team.

== Club career ==
Eleazar Soria was born in Lima. At club level he played for Universitario de Deportes, Independiente (Argentina) and Sporting Cristal. He won the Libertadores Cup with Independiente in 1975, as well as four Peruvian Leagues with Universitario (1967, 1969, 1971 and 1974) and two more with Sporing Cristal (1979, 1980).

== International career ==
Eleazar Soria earned 29 caps for the Peru national team between 1972 and 1978.

== Death ==
Eleazar Soria died on 24 June 2021 aged 73.

== Honors ==
Universitario

- Peruvian Premier Division: 1967, 1969, 1971, 1974

Sporting Cristal

- Peruvian Premier Division: 1979, 1980

Independiente

- Copa Libertadores: 1975
- Copa Interamericana: 1976

Peru

- Copa América: 1975

== See also ==
- 1978 FIFA World Cup squads
