= Fernando Cuéllar (footballer) =

Peruvian footballer (1945–2008)

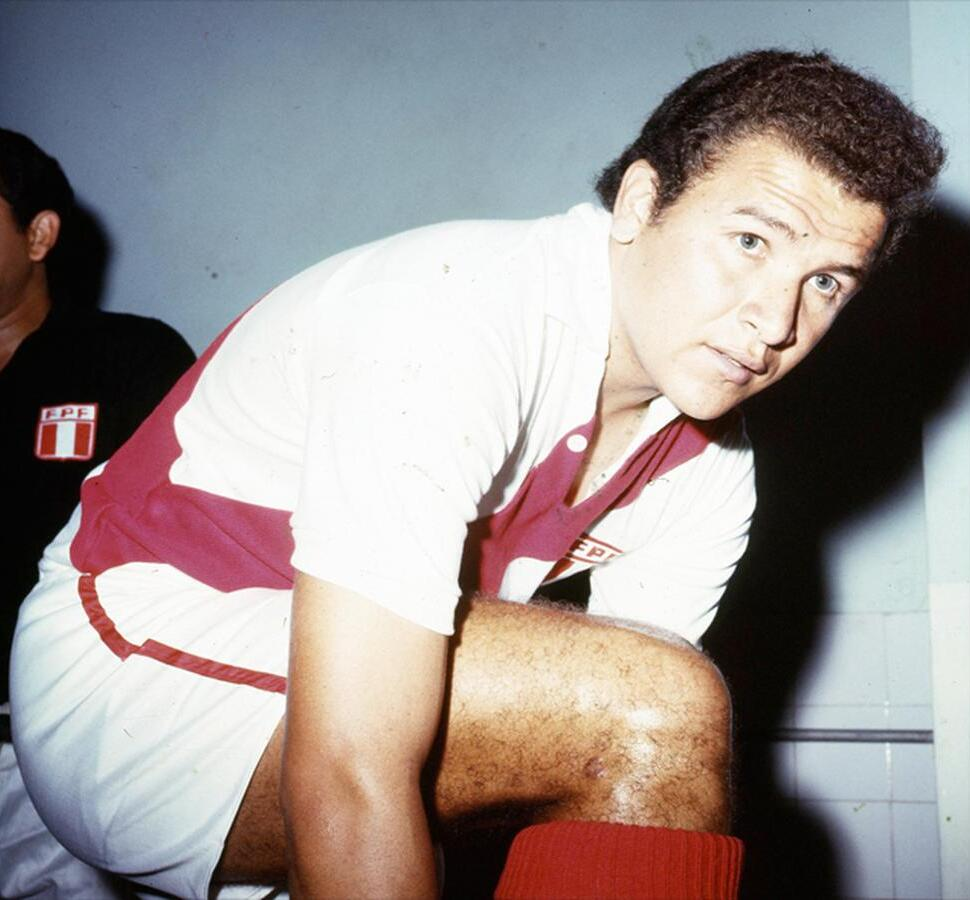
- Cuéllar playing for Peru

Personal information
- Full name: Fernando Cuéllar Ábalos
- Date of birth: August 27, 1945
- Place of birth: Moquegua, Peru
- Date of death: November 5, 2008 (aged 63)
- Height: 1.84 m (6 ft 0 in)
- Position: Defender

Youth career
- Universitario

Senior career*
Years	Team	Apps	(Gls)
1968–1980	Universitario		
1981	León de Huánuco		

International career
1971–1975	Peru	9	(0)

Managerial career
- 1984: León de Huánuco
- 1985-1986: San Agustín
- 1987: Peru
- 1990-1991: Universitario
- 1997: FBC Melgar
- 2004: Universidad San Martín
- * Club domestic league appearances and goals

Fernando Cuéllar Ávalos (August 27, 1945 – November 5, 2008) was a Peruvian football player.

== Club career ==
He was a defender and mainly played in Universitario de Deportes in the 1970s.

== International career ==
Cuéllar made nine appearances for the senior Peru national football team from 1971 to 1975.

== Career as manager ==
Cuéllar was also a successful trainer, leading San Agustin (a very small club from Lima) to win the Peruvian Championship (called "Descentralizado"). He repeated that success with Universitario de Deportes in 1990.

== Personal ==
Cuéllar died 5 November 2008 in Lima.
