= Héctor Chumpitaz =

Peruvian footballer (born 1943)

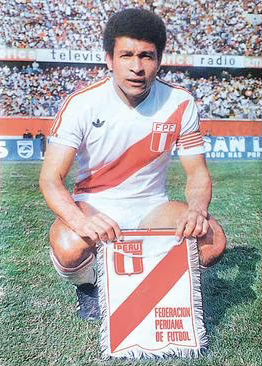
- Chumpitaz with the Peru national team in the late 1970s

Personal information
- Full name: Héctor Eduardo Chumpitaz González
- Date of birth: 12 April 1943 (age 83)
- Place of birth: Cañete, Peru
- Height: 1.70 m (5 ft 7 in)
- Position: Centre back

Youth career
- Universitario

Senior career*
| Years | Team | Apps | (Gls) |
| 1964–1965 | Deportivo Municipal | 32 | (5) |
| 1965–1975 | Universitario | 245 | (46) |
| 1975–1977 | Atlas | 60 | (6) |
| 1977–1984 | Sporting Cristal | 128 | (8) |
| Total | | 465 | (65) |

International career
| 1965–1981 | Peru | 105 | (3) |

Managerial career
- 1985: Unión Huaral
- 1985–1986: Sporting Cristal
- 1991: AELU
Medal record
Men's football
Representing Peru
Copa América
| Winner | 1975 |
| Bronze medal – third place | 1979 |
- * Club domestic league appearances and goals

Héctor Eduardo Chumpitaz González (Latin American Spanish: [ˈeɣtoɾ ˈtʃumpitas]; born 12 April 1943) is a Peruvian former footballer. He was voted one of the greatest defenders of all time, among the 30 best defenders in football history, and included within the 100 best players in the history of the World Cup by FIFA in 2018. He is also a member of the Historic Ideal Team of Copa América by CONMEBOL. In addition, he is the seventh highest-scoring South American defender in football history, with 65 official goals.

Considered by FIFA as one of the best South American defenders of all time, Chumpitaz is also one of the greatest exponents in the history of Peruvian football. He spent most of his career at Universitario de Deportes and Sporting Cristal. He currently has a football school named as him, where he is dedicated to training minors.

Chumpitaz spent most of his club career with Universitario de Deportes, winning five Peruvian League titles and finishing runner-up in the Copa Libertadores in 1972.

In addition to having won three other national titles with Sporting Cristal, Chumpitaz is remembered for having been captain of the American team that played a friendly match against the stars of Europe, among them were Giacinto Facchetti, Eusébio da Silva Ferreira, Johan Cruyff —who was the captain of Europe, among other figures. It was there that he was given the nickname "El Capitán de America" ("Captain America").

At the national team level, for almost fifteen years Chumpitaz was the captain and great defensive bulwark of the Peru national team that won the Copa América 1975 and reached the quarterfinals in the FIFA World Cup of Mexico 1970 and Argentina 1978.

Chumpitaz is considered one of the greatest South American defenders of all-time and was named to the list of best FIFA World Cup players of all time by Terra.com in 2006. He was elected the 35th best South American footballer of the 20th century in a poll by the IFFHS in 2000.

== Club career ==
At the age of 19, Chumpitaz joined a second division team in Peru, the Unidad Vecinal. Chumpitaz became a first division player in 1964, when he was signed by Deportivo Municipal, a team where he stayed until 1965.

During 1966, Chumpitaz began playing for Universitario de Deportes, where he was part of the team that won five Peruvian league championships (1966, 1967, 1969, 1971 and 1974).

Chumpitaz captained the Universitario de Deportes side to a runner-up place in the Copa Libertadores 1972, losing 2–1 to Independiente of Argentina in the final.

In 1973, All-Star teams from the American and European continents played against each other in Barcelona, Spain. Football greats such as Johan Cruyff and Franz Beckenbauer participated in that game. Chumpitaz was selected captain of the American continent's team, thus earning the nickname "America's Captain". The game finished 4–4 and in Penalty kicks, America won 7–6.

The following year, Chumpitaz was signed for the first time by an international club, Club Atlas of Mexico.

In 1977, Chumpitaz went on to play for Sporting Cristal, a team he would play with until 1984. He won three Peruvian league championships (1979, 1980 and 1983) with the team.

Chumpitaz became the national soccer top scoring defender of Peruvian Primera División, with 65 goals in 456 matches.

== International career ==
On 3 April 1965, Chumpitaz played his debut game with the Peru national team when Peru lost to Paraguay, 1–0, in Lima. On 16 May 1965, Chumpitaz played his debut World Cup qualifier game where Peru beat Venezuela, 1–0, in Lima. His debut international game came that same year as Peru and Venezuela held a rematch in Caracas, with Peru defeating the Venezuelans, 6–3.

Chumpitaz secured his first World Cup action when Peru, winning 1–0 in Lima, and soon tied with Argentina, 2–2, on 31 August 1969, in Buenos Aires. Chumpitaz played his first World Cup game on 2 June 1970, when the Peru defeated Bulgaria, 3–2, in León, Mexico. Although Peru advanced to the quarterfinals of that World Cup, they were eliminated by Brazil on 14 June in Guadalajara, by a score of 4–2.

Chumpitaz played for Peru's national team in the Brazil Independence Cup, held between 18 and 25 June 1972, in Manaus, Brazil. He helped his team to the championship game with a 1–0 victory over Venezuela, but Peru lost in its group's final game to Yugoslavia, 2–1.

In 1975, Chumpitaz played for the national team that won the Copa America held in Colombia.

Chumpitaz returned to the World Cup in 1978, when Peru played for the FIFA's most heralded championship in Argentina. Peru played six games in that World Cup, winning two of them. Peru were eliminated after losing to hosts Argentina, 6–0. This would turn out to be Chumpitaz's last World Cup participation; he retired from the Peru national team after the team qualified for the 1982 World Cup, held in Spain. Chumpitaz played a total of 105 games with the national team.

== Personal life ==
Chumpitaz was born in Cañete.

After retiring, he continued being a public figure, and, on 3 December 2004, he was found guilty and sentenced to four years of suspended sentence (probation), for allegedly accepting US$30,000 from presidential advisor and right-hand man Vladimiro Montesinos, supposedly after joining former minister Juan Carlos Hurtado Miller in latter's quest to become mayor of Lima in 1998, during Alberto Fujimori's presidency. After the appeals process, on 8 April 2005, the Supreme Court of Peru nullified the sentence against Chumpitaz.

== Career statistics ==
=== Club ===
Appearances and goals by club, season and competition
| Club | Season | League | | | National cup | | Continental | | Total | |
| Club | Season | Division | Apps | Goals | Apps | Goals | Apps | Goals | Apps | Goals |
|---|---|---|---|---|---|---|---|---|---|---|
| Deportivo Municipal | 1964 | Peruvian Primera División | 0 | 0 | – | | – | | | |
| Deportivo Municipal | 1965 | Peruvian Primera División | | | – | | – | | | |
| Universitario | 1966 | Peruvian Primera División | | | – | | 10 | 2 | | |
| Universitario | 1967 | Peruvian Primera División | | | – | | 13 | 3 | | |
| Universitario | 1968 | Peruvian Primera División | | | – | | 10 | 1 | | |
| Universitario | 1969 | Peruvian Primera División | | | – | | | | | |
| Universitario | 1970 | Peruvian Primera División | | | – | | 8 | 0 | | |
| Universitario | 1971 | Peruvian Primera División | | | – | | 8 | 1 | | |
| Universitario | 1972 | Peruvian Primera División | | | – | | 7 | 0 | | |
| Universitario | 1973 | Peruvian Primera División | | | – | | 2 | 0 | | |
| Universitario | 1974 | Peruvian Primera División | | | – | | | | | |
| Universitario | 1975 | Peruvian Primera División | | | – | | | | | |
| Atlas | 1975–76 | Mexican Primera División | | | | | | | | |
| Atlas | 1976–77 | Mexican Primera División | | | – | | | | | |
| Sporting Cristal | 1977 | Peruvian Primera División | | | – | | | | | |
| Sporting Cristal | 1978 | Peruvian Primera División | | | – | | 4 | 0 | | |
| Sporting Cristal | 1979 | Peruvian Primera División | | | – | | | | | |
| Sporting Cristal | 1980 | Peruvian Primera División | | | – | | 6 | 1 | | |
| Sporting Cristal | 1981 | Peruvian Primera División | | | – | | 6 | 1 | | |
| Sporting Cristal | 1982 | Peruvian Primera División | | | – | | | | | |
| Sporting Cristal | 1983 | Peruvian Primera División | | | – | | | | | |
| Career total | | | 456 | 65 | 0 | 0 | 74 | 9 | 530 | 74 |

=== International ===
Scores and results list Peru's goal tally first, score column indicates score after each Chumpitaz goal.

List of international goals scored by Héctor Chumpitaz
| No. | Date | Venue | Opponent | Score | Result | Competition |
|---|---|---|---|---|---|---|
| 1 | 18 June 1969 | Estadio Nacional, Lima, Peru | Colombia | | 1–1 | Friendly |
| 2 | 2 June 1970 | Estadio Nou Camp, León, Mexico | Bulgaria | | 3–2 | 1970 FIFA World Cup |
| 3 | 10 October 1979 | Estadio Nacional, Lima, Peru | Paraguay | | 2–3 | Friendly |

== Honours ==
Universitario de Deportes

- Peruvian League: 1966, 1967, 1969, 1971, 1974; runner-up 1972
- Copa Libertadores runner-up: 1972

Sporting Cristal

- Peruvian League: 1979, 1980, 1983; runner-up 1977

Peru

- Copa América: 1975

Individual

- CONMEBOL Best Defender: 1969, 1971
- 1973 All Stars CONMEBOL: Captain
- 2000 World Soccer's: The 100 Greatest Footballers of All Time
- 2004 South American – Player of the Century: Ranking Nº 35
- 2007 Midfield Dynamo's 10 Heroes of the Copa América
- 2007 Copa America All-Star team, all-time
- 2008 All Stars CONMEBOL in the last 50 years
- 2008 Defender all-time scoring: Ranking Nº 32
- Copa América Historical Dream Team: 2011

== See also ==
- List of men's footballers with 100 or more international caps
