= Percy Rojas =

Peruvian footballer (born 1949)

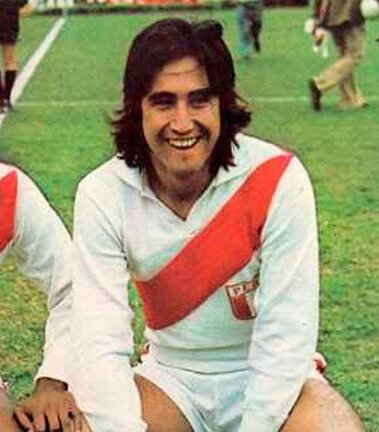

Personal information
- Full name: Percy Rojas Montero
- Date of birth: September 16, 1949 (age 77)
- Place of birth: Lima, Peru
- Height: 1.76 m (5 ft 9 1/2 in)
- Positions: Striker; midfielder

Youth career
- Universitario

Senior career*
Years	Team	Apps	(Gls)
1967–1974	Universitario		
1975–1976	Independiente	72	(27)
1977–1980	Sporting Cristal	142	(42)
1981–1982	RFC sérésien	29	(11)
1982–1984	Universitario		
Total		243	(80)

International career
1969–1979	Peru	49	(7)

Managerial career
- 1986: Universitario
- 1987: Universitario
- 1987: San Agustín
- 1989: Internazionale San Borja
- 1989: Peru
- 1990: Meteor SC
Medal record
Men's football
Representing Peru
Copa América
Winner	1975
- * Club domestic league appearances and goals

Percy Rojas Montero (born September 16, 1949) is a retired football midfielder from Peru. He played on Peru national football team at two FIFA World Cups (1978 and 1982). He played also in the 1975 Copa América final with the Peru national team.

== Professional career ==
At the professional level he played for Universitario de Deportes, Independiente (Argentina), Sporting Cristal and Sérésien (Belgium). He won the Peruvian Primera División with Universitario five times (1967, 1969, 1971, 1974 and 1982) and two more with Sporting Cristal (1979, 1980).

In 1975 he was transferred to Independiente, a club with which he finally won the 1975 Copa Libertadores scoring a goal in the final and with which he won the Copa Interamericana the following year.

== International career ==
Rojas made 49 appearances with the Peru national football team from 1969 to 1979. He was part of the Peruvian soccer team that won the 1975 Copa América and reached the second round of the 1978 FIFA World Cup.

== Managerial career ==
Once his playing career ended, he embarked on a coaching career. But this was very brief. He notably took the reins of Universitario de Deportes in 1986 (on an interim basis) and 1987. Assistant to José Macía with the Peruvian national team, he served as interim coach for the Uruguay–Peru match on September 24, 1989, a qualifier for the 1990 World Cup (a 2-0 defeat).

He worked as a sports commentator for the channel Golperu.

== Honours (player) ==
Source : El Bocón

Season	Club	Title
1967	Universitario de Deportes	Peruvian League
1969	Universitario de Deportes	Peruvian League
1971	Universitario de Deportes	Peruvian League
1974	Universitario de Deportes	Peruvian League
1975	Peru national team	Copa America
1975	Independiente	Copa Libertadores
1976	Independiente	Copa Interamericana
1979	Sporting Cristal	Peruvian League
1980	Sporting Cristal	Peruvian League
1981–82	RFC sérésien	Belgian Second Division
1982	Universitario de Deportes	Peruvian League
