= 1989 Torneo Plácido Galindo =

Torneo Plácido Galindo
Tournament details
- Country: Peru
- Dates: 21 May – 29 September 1989

Final positions
- Champions: Defensor Lima

The Torneo Plácido Galindo was played during the 1989 Copa América. The 42 football clubs were divided into 5 groups and the top teams advanced to the quarterfinals. Although Defensor Lima won the tournament, they qualified to Regional II's Liguilla Playoffs.

== Teams ==
| Team | City | Stadium | Capacity |
|---|---|---|---|
| AELU | Lima | Nacional | 45,750 |
| Alfonso Ugarte | Puno | Enrique Torres Belón | 20,000 |
| Alianza Atlético | Sullana | Campeones del 36 | 8,000 |
| Alianza Lima | Lima | Alejandro Villanueva | 35,000 |
| Alipio Ponce | Mazamari | Municipal de Mazamari | 15,000 |
| ADT | Tarma | Unión Tarma | 9,000 |
| Atlético Belén | Moyobamba | IPD de Moyobamba | 8,000 |
| Atlético Grau | Piura | Miguel Grau (Piura) | 25,000 |
| Atlético Huracán | Moquegua | Héroes de Estuquiña | 3,000 |
| Atlético Torino | Talara | Campeonísimo | 8,000 |
| Aurora | Arequipa | Mariano Melgar | 20,000 |
| Carlos A. Mannucci | Trujillo | Mansiche | 24,000 |
| Chacarita Versalles | Iquitos | Max Augustín | 24,000 |
| Cienciano | Cusco | Garcilaso | 42,056 |
| CNI | Iquitos | Max Augustín | 24,000 |
| Coronel Bolognesi | Tacna | Jorge Basadre | 19,850 |
| Defensor ANDA | Aucayacu | Heraclio Tapia | 15,000 |
| Defensor Lima | Lima | Nacional | 45,750 |
| Deportivo Cañaña | Chiclayo | Elías Aguirre | 24,500 |
| Deportivo Hospital | Pucallpa | Aliardo Soria Pérez | 15,000 |
| Deportivo Junín | Huancayo | Huancayo | 20,000 |
| Deportivo Municipal | Lima | Nacional | 45,750 |
| Deportivo Tintaya | Cusco | Garcilaso | 42,056 |
| Diablos Rojos | Juliaca | Enrique Torres Belón | 20,000 |
| Internazionale | Lima | Nacional | 45,750 |
| Juan Aurich | Chiclayo | Elías Aguirre | 24,500 |
| Libertad | Trujillo | Mansiche | 24,000 |
| León de Huánuco | Huánuco | Heraclio Tapia | 15,000 |
| Melgar | Arequipa | Mariano Melgar | 20,000 |
| Meteor | Chancay | Rómulo Shaw Cisneros | 13,000 |
| Octavio Espinosa | Ica | José Picasso Peratta | 8,000 |
| San Agustín | Lima | Nacional | 45,750 |
| San Martín de Porres | Pucallpa | Aliardo Soria Pérez | 15,000 |
| 15 de Setiembre | Trujillo | Mansiche | 24,000 |
| Social Magdalena | Ayacucho | Ciudad de Cumaná | 15,000 |
| Sporting Cristal | Lima | San Martín de Porres | 15,000 |
| Unión Huaral | Huaral | Julio Lores Colan | 10,000 |
| Unión Minas | Cerro de Pasco | Daniel Alcides Carrión | 8,000 |
| Unión Tarapoto | Tarapoto | Carlos Vidaurre García | 1,000 |
| UTC | Cajamarca | Héroes de San Ramón | 18,000 |
| Universitario | Lima | Nacional | 45,750 |

== Group Stage ==
=== Región Metropolitana ===
==== Group 1 ====
| Pos | Team | Pld | W | SW | SL | L | GF | GA | GD | Pts | Qualification |
|---|---|---|---|---|---|---|---|---|---|---|---|
| 1 | Defensor Lima | 6 | 3 | 1 | 0 | 2 | 9 | 8 | +1 | 11 | Final Group |
| 2 | Alianza Lima | 6 | 3 | 0 | 2 | 1 | 8 | 6 | +2 | 11 | Final Group |
| 3 | Meteor Sport | 6 | 1 | 1 | 2 | 2 | 7 | 8 | −1 | 7 | |
| 4 | AELU | 6 | 1 | 2 | 0 | 3 | 6 | 8 | −2 | 7 | |

===== Results =====
| Team 1 | Score | Team 2 |
|---|---|---|
| Alianza Lima | 2–2 (5–6 p) | Meteor Sport |
| AELU | 3–1 | Defensor Lima |
| Defensor Lima | 1–0 | Alianza Lima |
| Meteor Sport | – | AELU |
| Alianza Lima | 1–1 (4–5 p) | AELU |
| Defensor Lima | – | Meteor Sport |
| Meteor Sport | 0–1 | Alianza Lima |
| Defensor Lima | – | AELU |
| Alianza Lima | 2–1 | Defensor Lima |
| AELU | – | Meteor Sport |
| AELU | 0–2 | Alianza Lima |
| Meteor Sport | 3–3 (3–5 p) | Defensor Lima |

==== Group 2 ====
| Pos | Team | Pld | W | SW | SL | L | GF | GA | GD | Pts |
|---|---|---|---|---|---|---|---|---|---|---|
| 1 | Deportivo Municipal | 6 | 3 | 0 | 1 | 1 | 9 | 5 | +4 | 13 |
| 2 | Universitario | 6 | 3 | 1 | 1 | 1 | 11 | 4 | +7 | 12 |
| 3 | Octavio Espinosa | 6 | 1 | 1 | 1 | 3 | 4 | 10 | −6 | 6 |
| 4 | Internazionale | 6 | 1 | 1 | 0 | 4 | 4 | 9 | −5 | 5 |

===== Results =====
| Team 1 | Score | Team 2 |
|---|---|---|
| Octavio Espinosa | 1–5 | Universitario |
| Universitario | 3–0 | Internazionale |
| Universitario | 2–1 | Deportivo Municipal |
| Universitario | 1–1 (6–5 p) | Octavio Espinosa |
| Internazionale | 2–0 | Universitario |
| Deportivo Municipal | 1–0 | Universitario |

==== Group 3 ====
| Pos | Team | Pld | W | SW | SL | L | GF | GA | GD | Pts |
|---|---|---|---|---|---|---|---|---|---|---|
| 1 | Unión Huaral | 4 | 2 | 1 | 0 | 1 | 4 | 3 | +1 | 8 |
| 2 | San Agustín | 4 | 1 | 0 | 2 | 1 | 5 | 4 | +1 | 5 |
| 3 | Sporting Cristal | 4 | 0 | 2 | 1 | 1 | 2 | 4 | −2 | 5 |

===== Results =====
| Team 1 | Score | Team 2 |
|---|---|---|
| Sporting Cristal | 0–0 (3–5 p) | Unión Huaral |
| Unión Huaral | 2–0 | San Agustín |
| San Agustín | 1–1 (3–5 p) | Sporting Cristal |
| Unión Huaral | 2–0 | Sporting Cristal |
| San Agustín | 3–0 | Unión Huaral |
| Sporting Cristal | 1–1 (5–4 p) | San Agustín |

==== Final Group ====
| Pos | Team | Pld | W | SW | SL | L | GF | GA | GD | Pts | Qualification |
|---|---|---|---|---|---|---|---|---|---|---|---|
| 1 | Alianza Lima | 5 | 2 | 1 | 2 | 0 | 5 | 1 | +4 | 10 | Quarterfinals |
| 2 | Universitario | 5 | 2 | 1 | 0 | 2 | 5 | 4 | +1 | 8 | Quarterfinals |
| 3 | Defensor Lima | 4 | 2 | 0 | 1 | 1 | 3 | 2 | +1 | 7 | Quarterfinals |
| 4 | Unión Huaral | 5 | 1 | 2 | 0 | 2 | 3 | 4 | −1 | 7 | Quarterfinals |
| 5 | San Agustín | 5 | 2 | 0 | 1 | 2 | 5 | 7 | −2 | 7 | |
| 6 | Deportivo Municipal | 4 | 0 | 1 | 1 | 2 | 1 | 4 | −3 | 3 | |

===== Results =====
| Team 1 | Score | Team 2 |
|---|---|---|
| Unión Huaral | 1–1 (4–1 p) | Alianza Lima |
| Universitario | 2–0 | Defensor Lima |
| San Agustín | – | Deportivo Municipal |
| Deportivo Municipal | 0–0 (4–2 p) | Alianza Lima |
| Unión Huaral | 2–1 | Universitario |
| Defensor Lima | 2–0 | San Agustín |
| Alianza Lima | 0–0 (5–4 p) | Defensor Lima |
| Universitario | 1–1 (4–2 p) | San Agustín |
| Deportivo Municipal | – | Unión Huaral |
| San Agustín | 0–3 | Alianza Lima |
| Deportivo Municipal | 0–1 | Universitario |
| Defensor Lima | – | Unión Huaral |
| Alianza Lima | 1–0 | Universitario |
| Unión Huaral | – | San Agustín |
| Defensor Lima | 2–0 | Deportivo Municipal |

=== Región Norte ===
==== Group 1 ====
| Pos | Team | Pld | W | SW | SL | L | GF | GA | GD | Pts |
|---|---|---|---|---|---|---|---|---|---|---|
| 1 | Carlos A. Mannucci | 0 | 0 | 0 | 0 | 0 | 0 | 0 | 0 | 0 |
| 2 | Atlético Torino | 0 | 0 | 0 | 0 | 0 | 0 | 0 | 0 | 0 |
| 3 | Deportivo Cañaña | 0 | 0 | 0 | 0 | 0 | 0 | 0 | 0 | 0 |

==== Group 2 ====
| Pos | Team | Pld | W | SW | SL | L | GF | GA | GD | Pts |
|---|---|---|---|---|---|---|---|---|---|---|
| 1 | UTC | 0 | 0 | 0 | 0 | 0 | 0 | 0 | 0 | 0 |
| 2 | Atlético Grau | 0 | 0 | 0 | 0 | 0 | 0 | 0 | 0 | 0 |
| 3 | Libertad | 0 | 0 | 0 | 0 | 0 | 0 | 0 | 0 | 0 |

==== Group 3 ====
| Pos | Team | Pld | W | SW | SL | L | GF | GA | GD | Pts |
|---|---|---|---|---|---|---|---|---|---|---|
| 1 | Alianza Atlético | 0 | 0 | 0 | 0 | 0 | 0 | 0 | 0 | 0 |
| 2 | Juan Aurich | 0 | 0 | 0 | 0 | 0 | 0 | 0 | 0 | 0 |
| 3 | 15 de Setiembre | 0 | 0 | 0 | 0 | 0 | 0 | 0 | 0 | 0 |

==== Final Group ====
| Pos | Team | Pld | W | SW | SL | L | GF | GA | GD | Pts | Qualification |
|---|---|---|---|---|---|---|---|---|---|---|---|
| 1 | Alianza Atlético | 0 | 0 | 0 | 0 | 0 | 0 | 0 | 0 | 0 | Quarterfinals |
| 2 | Carlos A. Mannucci | 0 | 0 | 0 | 0 | 0 | 0 | 0 | 0 | 0 | |
| 3 | UTC | 0 | 0 | 0 | 0 | 0 | 0 | 0 | 0 | 0 | |

=== Región Sur ===
==== Group 1 ====
| Pos | Team | Pld | W | SW | SL | L | GF | GA | GD | Pts |
|---|---|---|---|---|---|---|---|---|---|---|
| 1 | Aurora | 6 | 2 | 4 | 0 | 0 | 5 | 0 | +5 | 14 |
| 2 | Melgar | 6 | 3 | 0 | 2 | 1 | 8 | 2 | +6 | 11 |
| 3 | Coronel Bolognesi | 5 | 1 | 1 | 1 | 2 | 2 | 7 | −5 | 6 |
| 4 | Atlético Huracán | 5 | 0 | 0 | 2 | 3 | 2 | 8 | −6 | 2 |

===== Results =====
| Team 1 | Score | Team 2 |
|---|---|---|
| Melgar | 1–0 | Atlético Huracán |
| Coronel Bolognesi | 0–0 (1–4 p) | Aurora |
| Aurora | 4–0 | Atlético Huracán |
| Coronel Bolognesi | 1–0 | Melgar |
| Melgar | 0–0 (4–5 p) | Aurora |
| Atlético Huracán | 1–1 (4–5 p) | Coronel Bolognesi |
| Atlético Huracán | 1–2 | Melgar |
| Aurora | 1–0 | Coronel Bolognesi |
| Atlético Huracán | 0–0 (2–4 p) | Aurora |
| Melgar | 5–0 | Coronel Bolognesi |
| Aurora | 0–0 (3–1 p) | Melgar |
| Coronel Bolognesi | – | Atlético Huracán |

==== Group 2 ====
| Pos | Team | Pld | W | SW | SL | L | GF | GA | GD | Pts |
|---|---|---|---|---|---|---|---|---|---|---|
| 1 | Cienciano | 6 | 4 | 0 | 0 | 2 | 11 | 4 | +7 | 12 |
| 2 | Alfonso Ugarte | 6 | 3 | 0 | 1 | 2 | 8 | 4 | +4 | 10 |
| 3 | Diablos Rojos | 5 | 1 | 1 | 1 | 2 | 5 | 8 | −3 | 6 |
| 4 | Deportivo Tintaya | 5 | 1 | 1 | 0 | 3 | 4 | 12 | −8 | 5 |

===== Results =====
| Team 1 | Score | Team 2 |
|---|---|---|
| Diablos Rojos | 0–0 (4–2 p) | Alfonso Ugarte |
| Deportivo Tintaya | 1–4 | Cienciano |
| Alfonso Ugarte | 4–0 | Deportivo Tintaya |
| Cienciano | 2–0 | Diablos Rojos |
| Cienciano | 2–0 | Alfonso Ugarte |
| Diablos Rojos | 2–2 (13–14 p) | Deportivo Tintaya |
| Alfonso Ugarte | 3–1 | Diablos Rojos |
| Cienciano | 2–0 | Deportivo Tintaya |
| Deportivo Tintaya | 1–0 | Alfonso Ugarte |
| Diablos Rojos | 2–1 | Cienciano |
| Alfonso Ugarte | 1–0 | Cienciano |
| Deportivo Tintaya | – | Diablos Rojos |

==== Final Group ====
| Pos | Team | Pld | W | SW | SL | L | GF | GA | GD | Pts | Qualification |
|---|---|---|---|---|---|---|---|---|---|---|---|
| 1 | Cienciano | 6 | 3 | 1 | 1 | 1 | 9 | 5 | +4 | 12 | Quarterfinals |
| 2 | Aurora | 6 | 1 | 3 | 1 | 1 | 2 | 2 | 0 | 10 | |
| 3 | Melgar | 6 | 2 | 1 | 1 | 2 | 5 | 6 | −1 | 9 | |
| 4 | Alfonso Ugarte | 6 | 1 | 0 | 2 | 3 | 3 | 6 | −3 | 5 | |

===== Results =====
| Team 1 | Score | Team 2 |
|---|---|---|
| Melgar | 1–0 | Alfonso Ugarte |
| Cienciano | 0–0 (2–3 p) | Aurora |
| Aurora | 1–0 | Alfonso Ugarte |
| Cienciano | 3–1 | Melgar |
| Alfonso Ugarte | 2–1 | Cienciano |
| Melgar | 0–0 (3–5 p) | Aurora |
| Alfonso Ugarte | 1–1 (3–5 p) | Melgar |
| Aurora | 1–1 (8–9 p) | Cienciano |
| Alfonso Ugarte | 0–0 (1–2 p) | Aurora |
| Melgar | 1–2 | Cienciano |
| Cienciano | 2–0 | Alfonso Ugarte |
| Aurora | 0–1 | Melgar |

=== Región Centro ===
==== Group 1 ====
| Pos | Team | Pld | W | SW | SL | L | GF | GA | GD | Pts |
|---|---|---|---|---|---|---|---|---|---|---|
| 1 | Deportivo Junín | 0 | 0 | 0 | 0 | 0 | 0 | 0 | 0 | 0 |
| 2 | Mina San Vicente | 0 | 0 | 0 | 0 | 0 | 0 | 0 | 0 | 0 |
| 3 | ADT | 0 | 0 | 0 | 0 | 0 | 0 | 0 | 0 | 0 |
| 4 | Alipio Ponce | 0 | 0 | 0 | 0 | 0 | 0 | 0 | 0 | 0 |

==== Group 2 ====
| Pos | Team | Pld | W | SW | SL | L | GF | GA | GD | Pts |
|---|---|---|---|---|---|---|---|---|---|---|
| 1 | Unión Minas | 0 | 0 | 0 | 0 | 0 | 0 | 0 | 0 | 0 |
| 2 | León de Huánuco | 0 | 0 | 0 | 0 | 0 | 0 | 0 | 0 | 0 |
| 3 | Social Magdalena | 0 | 0 | 0 | 0 | 0 | 0 | 0 | 0 | 0 |
| 4 | Defensor ANDA | 0 | 0 | 0 | 0 | 0 | 0 | 0 | 0 | 0 |

==== Final Group ====
| Pos | Team | Pld | W | SW | SL | L | GF | GA | GD | Pts | Qualification |
|---|---|---|---|---|---|---|---|---|---|---|---|
| 1 | Deportivo Junín | 0 | 0 | 0 | 0 | 0 | 0 | 0 | 0 | 0 | Quarterfinals |
| 2 | Unión Minas | 0 | 0 | 0 | 0 | 0 | 0 | 0 | 0 | 0 | |
| 3 | León de Huánuco | 0 | 0 | 0 | 0 | 0 | 0 | 0 | 0 | 0 | |
| 4 | Mina San Vicente | 0 | 0 | 0 | 0 | 0 | 0 | 0 | 0 | 0 | |

=== Región Oriente ===
==== Group A ====
| Pos | Team | Pld | W | SW | SL | L | GF | GA | GD | Pts |
|---|---|---|---|---|---|---|---|---|---|---|
| 1 | Unión Tarapoto | 0 | 0 | 0 | 0 | 0 | 0 | 0 | 0 | 0 |
| 2 | Atlético Belén | 0 | 0 | 0 | 0 | 0 | 0 | 0 | 0 | 0 |

==== Group B ====
| Pos | Team | Pld | W | SW | SL | L | GF | GA | GD | Pts |
|---|---|---|---|---|---|---|---|---|---|---|
| 1 | San Martín de Porres | 0 | 0 | 0 | 0 | 0 | 0 | 0 | 0 | 0 |
| 2 | Deportivo Hospital | 0 | 0 | 0 | 0 | 0 | 0 | 0 | 0 | 0 |

==== Group C ====
| Pos | Team | Pld | W | SW | SL | L | GF | GA | GD | Pts |
|---|---|---|---|---|---|---|---|---|---|---|
| 1 | CNI | 0 | 0 | 0 | 0 | 0 | 0 | 0 | 0 | 0 |
| 2 | Chacarita Versalles | 0 | 0 | 0 | 0 | 0 | 0 | 0 | 0 | 0 |

==== Final Group ====
| Pos | Team | Pld | W | SW | SL | L | GF | GA | GD | Pts | Qualification |
|---|---|---|---|---|---|---|---|---|---|---|---|
| 1 | Unión Tarapoto | 0 | 0 | 0 | 0 | 0 | 0 | 0 | 0 | 0 | Quarterfinals |
| 2 | CNI | 0 | 0 | 0 | 0 | 0 | 0 | 0 | 0 | 0 | |
| 3 | San Martín de Porres | 0 | 0 | 0 | 0 | 0 | 0 | 0 | 0 | 0 | |

== Bracket ==
Quarter-finals
1 | Cienciano | 0 | 2 | 2
8 | Universitario | 2 | 1 | 3
5 | Deportivo Junín | 0 | 0 | 0
4 | Alianza Lima | 2 | 3 | 5
3 | Alianza Atlético | 1 | 1 | 2 (2)
6 | Defensor Lima | 0 | 2 | 2 (4)
7 | Unión Tarapoto | 0 | 0 | 0
2 | Unión Huaral | 2 | 4 | 6

Semi-finals
Universitario | 2 | 0 | 2
Alianza Lima | 0 | 1 | 1
Defensor Lima | 2 | 0 | 2 (4)
Unión Huaral | 0 | 2 | 2 (3)

Finals
Universitario | 1 | 1 | 2 (4)
Defensor Lima | 1 | 1 | 2 (5)

=== Quarterfinals ===
| Team 1 | Agg. | Team 2 | 1st leg | 2nd leg |
|---|---|---|---|---|
| Cienciano | 2–3 | Universitario | 0–2 | 2–1 |
| Alianza Lima | 5–0 | Deportivo Junín | 2–0 | 3–0 |
| Defensor Lima | 2–2 (4–2 p) | Alianza Atlético | 0–1 | 2–1 |
| Unión Huaral | 6–0 | Unión Tarapoto | 2–0 | 4–0 |

=== Semifinals ===
| Team 1 | Agg. | Team 2 | 1st leg | 2nd leg |
|---|---|---|---|---|
| Alianza Lima | 1–2 | Universitario | 0–2 | 1–0 |
| Defensor Lima | 2–2 (4–3 p) | Unión Huaral | 0–2 | 2–0 |

=== Final ===
22 September 1989

| Defensor Lima | 1–1 | Universitario |
|---|---|---|
| Waldemar Victorino 80' | | Jesús Torrealva 46' |

Estadio Nacional, Lima
1 October 1989

| Universitario | 1–1 | Defensor Lima |
|---|---|---|
| Andrés Gonzáles 30' | | Waldemar Victorino 89' |
Penalties
| Barco (penalty scored); Carranza (penalty scored); Peña (penalty scored); Vidales (penalty scored); Briceño (penalty missed) | 4–5 | Ternero (penalty scored); Peña (penalty scored); Zevallos (penalty scored); Saavedra (penalty scored); Waldemar Victorino (penalty scored) |

Estadio Nacional, Lima

Defensor Lima qualified for the Torneo Regional II - Liguilla Playoff.
