= 1990 Torneo Descentralizado =

Torneo Descentralizado
- Season: 1990
- Dates: 23 April 1990 – 3 February 1991
- Champions: Universitario
- Relegated: 15 de Septiembre; Alipio Ponce; Atlético Belén; Atlético Huracán; Chacarita Versalles; Defensor ANDA; Meteor Sport
- Copa Libertadores: Universitario; Sport Boys
- Top goalscorer: Cláudio Adão (31 goals)

The 1990 Torneo Descentralizado, the top tier of Peruvian football was played by 44 teams in the format of Regional Tournament. The national champion was Universitario.

== Teams ==
=== Team changes ===
Promoted from 1989 Segunda División	Promoted from 1989 Ligas Regionales	Relegated from 1989 Primera División
▲ Sport Boys (1st)	▲ Deportivo Pacífico (Región Norte - 1st) ▲ Deportivo Morba (Región Norte - 2nd) ▲ Unión Huayllaspanca (Región Centro - 1st) ▲ Deportivo Bancos (Región Oriente - 1st) ▲ Juvenil Los Ángeles (Región Sur - 1st)	▼ Juan Aurich (Zona Norte - 2th) ▼ Social Magdalena (Zona Centro - 6th) ▼ San Martín de Porres (Zona Oriente - 4th) ▼ Deportivo Tintaya (Zona Sur - 8th)

=== Stadia locations ===
Locations of the 1990 Primera División teams

Team	City	Stadium	Capacity
15 de Septiembre	Trujillo	Mansiche	24,000
ADT	Tarma	Unión Tarma	9,000
AELU	Pueblo Libre, Lima	Nacional	45,750
Alfonso Ugarte	Puno	Enrique Torres Belón	20,000
Alianza Atlético	Sullana	Campeones del 36	12,000
Alianza Lima	La Victoria, Lima	Alejandro Villanueva	35,000
Alipio Ponce	Mazamari	Municipal de Mazamari	4,000
Atlético Belén	Moyobamba	IPD de Moyobamba	8,000
Atlético Grau	Piura	Miguel Grau (Piura)	25,000
Atlético Huracán	Moquegua	25 de Noviembre	25,000
Atlético Torino	Talara	Campeonísimo	8,000
Aurora	Arequipa	Mariano Melgar	20,000
Carlos A. Mannucci	Trujillo	Mansiche	24,000
Chacarita Versalles	Iquitos	Max Augustín	24,000
Cienciano	Cusco	Garcilaso	42,056
CNI	Iquitos	Max Augustín	24,000
Coronel Bolognesi	Tacna	Jorge Basadre	19,850
Defensor ANDA	Aucayacu	Municipal de Aucayacu	5,000
Defensor Lima	Breña, Lima	Nacional	45,750
Deportivo Bancos	Pucallpa	Aliardo Soria	15,000
Deportivo Cañaña	Chiclayo	Elías Aguirre	24,500
Deportivo Hospital	Pucallpa	Aliardo Soria	15,000
Deportivo Junín	Huancayo	Huancayo	20,000
Deportivo Municipal	Cercado de Lima	Nacional	45,750
Deportivo Morba	Trujillo	Mansiche	24,000
Deportivo Pacífico	Zarumilla	24 de Julio	5,000
Diablos Rojos	Juliaca	Guillermo Briceño Rosamedina	20,030
Internazionale	San Borja, Lima	Nacional	45,750
Juvenil Los Ángeles	Moquegua	Héroes de Estuquiña	10,000
León de Huánuco	Huánuco	Heraclio Tapia	15,000
Libertad	Trujillo	Mansiche	24,000
Melgar	Arequipa	Mariano Melgar	20,000
Meteor Sport	Chancay	Rómulo Shaw Cisneros	13,000
Mina San Vicente	Junín, Peru	Municipal de San Ramón	10,000
Octavio Espinosa	Ica	José Picasso Peratta	8,000
San Agustín	San Isidro, Lima	Nacional	45,750
Sport Boys	Callao	Miguel Grau	17,000
Sporting Cristal	Rímac, Lima	Nacional	45,750
Unión Huaral	Huaral	Julio Lores Colan	10,000
Unión Huayllaspanca	Huancayo	Huancayo	20,000
Unión Minas	Cerro de Pasco	Daniel Alcides Carrión	8,000
Unión Tarapoto	Tarapoto	Carlos Vidaurre García	7,000
UTC	Cajamarca	Héroes de San Ramón	18,000
Universitario	Breña, Lima	Nacional	45,750

== Torneo Regional I ==
=== Zona Metropolitana ===
Pos	Team	Pld	W	D	L	GF	GA	GD	Pts	Qualification	UNI	ALI	HUA	SBA	DLI	CRI	AGU	MUN	INT	AEL	OCT	MET
1	Universitario	11	8	2	1	25	8	+17	18	Octogonal				3–1		1–0		1–0	1–0		3–1	3–0
2	Alianza Lima	11	5	5	1	16	8	+8	15	Octogonal	1–1		2–1	1–1	1–0	0–0	0–0	1–1				1–0
3	Unión Huaral	11	5	5	1	13	9	+4	15	Octogonal	2–2			1–1	–	–	–	–	–	–	–	–
4	Sport Boys	11	5	4	2	19	9	+10	14	Octogonal						1–1	2–1	2–0	1–1	4–0	4–0	2–0
5	Defensor Lima	11	4	4	3	10	10	0	12		1–5		–	1–0		–	–	–	–	–	–	–
6	Sporting Cristal	11	2	6	3	9	11	−2	10				–		–		–	–	–	–	–	–
7	San Agustín	11	3	4	4	7	13	−6	10		0–4		–		–	–		–	–	–	–	–
8	Deportivo Municipal	11	2	5	4	12	14	−2	9				–		–	–	–		–	–	–	–
9	Internazionale	11	1	7	3	5	9	−4	9			1–4	–		–	–	–	–		–	–	–
10	AELU	11	3	3	5	6	13	−7	9		2–1	2–1	–		–	–	–	–	–		–	–
11	Octavio Espinosa	11	1	4	6	11	22	−11	6			1–4	–		–	–	–	–	–	–		–
12	Meteor Sport	11	1	3	7	7	14	−7	5				–		–	–	–	–	–	–	–	

Legend: Blue = home team win; Yellow = draw; Red = away team win.

=== Zona Centro ===
Pos	Team	Pld	W	D	L	GF	GA	GD	Pts	Qualification	JUN	ADT	MSV	LEO	AND	APM	UMI	HUA
1	Deportivo Junín	0	0	0	0	0	0	0	0	Octogonal		–	–	–	–	–	–	–
2	ADT	0	0	0	0	0	0	0	0		–		–	–	–	–	–	–
3	Mina San Vicente	0	0	0	0	0	0	0	0		–	–		–	–	–	–	–
4	León de Huánuco	0	0	0	0	0	0	0	0		–	–	–		–	–	–	–
5	Defensor ANDA	0	0	0	0	0	0	0	0		–	–	–	–		–	–	–
6	Alipio Ponce	0	0	0	0	0	0	0	0		–	–	–	–	–		–	–
7	Unión Minas	0	0	0	0	0	0	0	0		–	–	–	–	–	–		–
8	Unión Huayllaspanca	0	0	0	0	0	0	0	0		–	–	–	–	–	–	–	

Legend: Blue = home team win; Yellow = draw; Red = away team win.

=== Zona Norte ===
Pos	Team	Pld	W	D	L	GF	GA	GD	Pts	Qualification	PAC	UTC	AAS	GRA	TOR	SEP	CAÑ	CAM	MOR	LIB
1	Deportivo Pacífico	18	11	1	6	25	11	+14	23	Octogonal		–	–	–	–	–	–	–	–	–
2	UTC	18	10	3	5	24	14	+10	23		–		–	–	–	–	–	–	–	–
3	Alianza Atlético	18	7	8	3	16	10	+6	22		2–0	1–0		1–1	0–0	1–0	0–0	3–1	1–0	1–0
4	Atlético Grau	18	8	6	4	25	19	+6	22		–	–	–		–	–	–	–	–	–
5	Atlético Torino	18	5	7	6	17	19	−2	17		–	–	–	–		–	–	–	–	–
6	15 de Septiembre	18	4	9	5	9	14	−5	17		–	–	–	–	–		–	–	–	–
7	Deportivo Cañaña	18	2	12	4	10	12	−2	16		–	–	–	–	–	–		–	–	–
8	Carlos A. Mannucci	18	4	7	7	16	21	−5	15		–	–	–	–	–	–	–		–	–
9	Deportivo Morba	18	4	6	8	17	27	−10	14		–	–	–	–	–	–	–	–		–
10	Libertad	18	2	7	9	11	22	−11	11		–	–	–	–	–	–	–	–	–	

Legend: Blue = home team win; Yellow = draw; Red = away team win.

==== Tiebreaker ====
3 August 1990	Deportivo Pacífico	2–1	UTC	Estadio Elías Aguirre, Chiclayo
15:30	Tomás Terranova 23'; Anselmo Soto 65'		Jorge Carpio 81'	Referee: Carlos Rivero

=== Zona Oriente ===
Pos	Team	Pld	W	D	L	GF	GA	GD	Pts	Qualification	HOS	BAN	TAR	CHA	BEL	CNI
1	Deportivo Hospital	0	0	0	0	0	0	0	0	Octogonal		–	–	–	–	–
2	Deportivo Bancos	0	0	0	0	0	0	0	0		–		–	–	–	–
3	Unión Tarapoto	0	0	0	0	0	0	0	0		–	–		–	–	–
4	Chacarita Versalles	0	0	0	0	0	0	0	0		–	–	–		–	–
5	Atlético Belén	0	0	0	0	0	0	0	0		–	–	–	–		–
6	CNI	0	0	0	0	0	0	0	0		–	–	–	–	–	

Legend: Blue = home team win; Yellow = draw; Red = away team win.

=== Zona Sur ===
Pos	Team	Pld	W	D	L	GF	GA	GD	Pts	Qualification	MEL	AUR	DRJ	ALF	COR	CIE	JLA	HUR
1	Melgar	14	10	4	0	46	13	+33	24	Octogonal		3–0	4–1	4–1	6–2	7–0	4–1	6–1
2	Aurora	14	8	1	5	23	14	+9	17		1–3		3–1	5–0	2–0	2–1	3–1	3–1
3	Diablos Rojos	14	5	4	5	13	18	−5	14		1–3	1–0		1–0	1–0	1–1	3–1	2–0
4	Alfonso Ugarte	14	6	2	6	13	19	−6	14		2–2	1–0	0–0		2–0	2–0	1–0	3–0
5	Coronel Bolognesi	14	5	3	6	16	17	−1	13		0–0	0–1	1–1	4–0		2–0	4–1	2–0
6	Cienciano	14	4	3	7	16	20	−4	11		2–2	0–0	4–0	0–1	3–0		2–0	3–0
7	Juvenil Los Ángeles	14	4	2	8	14	23	−9	10		1–2	2–1	1–0	2–0	0–1	2–0		1–1
8	Atlético Huracán	14	2	5	7	6	23	−17	9		0–0	0–2	0–0	1–0	0–0	1–0	1–1	

Legend: Blue = home team win; Yellow = draw; Red = away team win.

=== Octogonal ===
Team 1	Agg.	Team 2	1st leg	2nd leg
Melgar	3–3 (5–4 p)	Alianza Lima	2–0	1–3
Deportivo Junín	2–6	Universitario	1–0	1–6
Deportivo Hospital	2–6	Unión Huaral	1–1	1–5
Sport Boys	0–0	Deportivo Pacífico	0–0	W.O.

==== First leg ====
5 August 1990	Melgar	2–0	Alianza Lima	Estadio Mariano Melgar, Arequipa
15:30	Juvenal Briceño 20' 68'			Attendance: 16,583; Referee: Sergio Leiblinger

5 August 1990	Deportivo Junín	1–0	Universitario	Estadio Huancayo, Huancayo
15:30	Raúl Moreno 16'			Attendance: 10,709; Referee: Carlos Montalván

5 August 1990	Deportivo Hospital	1–1	Unión Huaral	Estadio Aliardo Soria Pérez, Pucallpa
15:30	Hubert Bardales 34'		Jorge Cordero 66'	Attendance: 2,300; Referee: Carlos Mansilla

5 August 1990	Sport Boys	0–0	Deportivo Pacífico	Estadio Alejandro Villanueva, Lima
15:30				Attendance: 3,405; Referee: Alberto Tejada

==== Second leg ====
12 August 1990	Deportivo Pacífico	W.O.*	Sport Boys	Estadio Miguel Grau, Piura
13:00

* The second leg was scheduled by the ADFP to be played at Estadio Miguel Grau in Piura, despite opposition from Deportivo Pacífico's directors, who wanted the match to be held at Estadio Mariscal Cáceres in Tumbes. However, the maroon side failed to appear for the match, and the FPF Disciplinary Committee subsequently awarded the victory to Sport Boys.

12 August 1990	Unión Huaral	5–1	Deportivo Hospital	Estadio Nacional, Lima
13:30	Alfonso Reyna 24' 58' 70'; Juan Carlos Cabanillas 35'; Jorge Cordero 87'		Rosnel Ramírez 76'	Referee: Félix Arredondo

12 August 1990	Universitario	6–1	Deportivo Junín	Estadio Nacional, Lima
15:30	Andrés Gonzales 18'; Alfonso Yáñez 37' (pen.) 76'; Roberto Martínez 57' 88'; Alfredo Saavedra 83'		Gustavo Ochoa 60'	Attendance: 5,510; Referee: Alfonso Postigo

16 August 1990	Alianza Lima	3–1 (4–5 p)	Melgar	Estadio Alejandro Villanueva, Lima
19:30	Rosinaldo Lopes 60'; César Cueto 65'; Juan Reynoso 68' (pen.)		Percy Quispe 67'	Attendance: 8,225; Referee: César Cachay
	Penalties
	Parcko Quiroz (penalty scored); Víctor Reyes (penalty scored); Ricardo Cano (penalty scored); Juan Reynoso (penalty scored); César Cueto (penalty missed)		César Adriazola (penalty scored); Víctor Concha (penalty scored); Genaro Neyra (penalty scored); Percy Quispe (penalty scored); Juvenal Briceño (penalty scored)

Melgar, Sport Boys, Unión Huaral and Universitario qualified for the Liguilla Final.

=== Liguilla Final ===
==== Standings ====
Pos	Team	Pld	W	D	L	GF	GA	GD	Pts	Qualification	SBA	UNI	HUA	MEL
1	Sport Boys	3	2	1	0	6	3	+3	5	1991 Copa Libertadores, Title Playoff			2–1	3–1
2	Universitario	3	1	2	0	3	2	+1	4		1–1		1–0	
3	Unión Huaral	3	1	0	2	4	5	−1	2					3–2
4	Melgar	3	0	1	2	4	7	−3	1			1–1		

Legend: Blue = home team win; Yellow = draw; Red = away team win.

==== Results ====
26 August 1990	Unión Huaral	3–2	Melgar	Estadio Nacional, Lima
13:30	Domingo Farfán 25'; Ernesto Aguirre 42'; Juan Carlos Cabanillas 75'		César Adriazola 29' (pen.) 70' (pen.)	Referee: Sergio Leiblinger

26 August 1990	Universitario	1–1	Sport Boys	Estadio Nacional, Lima
15:30	Pedro Requena 86' (pen.)		Ramón Anchisi 56'	Attendance: 17,201; Referee: Walter Barrios

30 August 1990	Sport Boys	3–1	Melgar	Estadio Nacional, Lima
13:30	Claudio Adao 11' (pen.); Oswaldo Flores 57'; Martín Ochandarte 78'		Ernesto Vera 31'	Referee: Alberto Tejada

30 August 1990	Universitario	1–0	Unión Huaral	Estadio Nacional, Lima
15:30	Alfonso Yáñez 19' (pen.)			Attendance: 17,892; Referee: Carlos Montalván

2 September 1990	Melgar	1–1	Universitario	Estadio Nacional, Lima
13:30	Andrés Gonzales 41'		César Adriazola 73'	Referee: Jaime Rodríguez

2 September 1990	Sport Boys	2–1	Unión Huaral	Estadio Nacional, Lima
15:30	Carlos Zegarra 8'; Carlos Enrique Paris 61'		Domingo Farfán 27'	Attendance: 20,305; Referee: Sergio Leiblinger

== Torneo Regional II ==
=== Zona Metropolitana ===
Pos	Team	Pld	W	D	L	GF	GA	GD	Pts	Qualification	ALI	SBA	UNI	HUA	MUN	DLI	CRI	AGU	OCT	INT	AEL	MET
1	Alianza Lima	22	13	5	4	32	13	+19	31	Octogonal		1–1	1–0	1–1	0–0	0–1	2–0	1–0	2–0	2–0	3–1	2–0
2	Sport Boys	22	8	14	0	32	18	+14	30	Octogonal	2–0		1–0	1–1	1–1	3–1	0–0	0–0	1–1	3–1	0–0	4–1
3	Universitario	22	11	7	4	33	12	+21	29	Octogonal	2–1	1–1		1–0	2–2	1–1	1–0	2–0	5–0	1–0	0–1	5–0
4	Unión Huaral	22	10	7	5	29	21	+8	27	Octogonal	0–0	1–1	0–3		–	–	–	–	–	–	–	–
5	Deportivo Municipal	22	8	9	5	24	20	+4	25		1–2	1–1	1–0	–		–	–	–	–	–	–	–
6	Defensor Lima	22	7	10	5	24	26	−2	24		0–4	1–3	1–1	–	–		–	–	–	–	–	–
7	Sporting Cristal	22	8	5	9	26	23	+3	21		1–1	1–2	1–2	–	–	–		–	–	–	–	–
8	San Agustín	22	3	12	7	17	20	−3	18		1–2	1–1	1–1	–	–	–	–		–	–	–	–
9	Octavio Espinosa	22	5	8	9	13	27	−14	18		0–1	2–2	0–0	–	–	–	–	–		–	–	–
10	Internazionale	22	4	8	10	23	29	−6	16		2–1	1–1	0–0	–	–	–	–	–	–		–	–
11	AELU	22	4	6	12	17	34	−17	14		0–3	1–2	0–2	–	–	–	–	–	–	–		–
12	Meteor Sport	22	2	7	13	18	45	−27	11		0–2	0–0	0–3	–	–	–	–	–	–	–	–	

Legend: Blue = home team win; Yellow = draw; Red = away team win.

=== Zona Norte ===
==== Group A ====
Pos	Team	Pld	W	D	L	GF	GA	GD	Pts	Qualification	AAS	PAC	CAÑ	TOR	GRA
1	Alianza Atlético	8	5	2	1	10	6	+4	12	Regional Semifinals		1–0	3–2	1–0	1–0
2	Deportivo Pacífico	0	0	0	0	0	0	0	0	Regional Semifinals	2–1		–	–	–
3	Deportivo Cañaña	0	0	0	0	0	0	0	0		1–1	–		–	–
4	Atlético Torino	0	0	0	0	0	0	0	0		1–1	–	–		–
5	Atlético Grau	0	0	0	0	0	0	0	0		0–1	–	–	–	

Legend: Blue = home team win; Yellow = draw; Red = away team win.

==== Group B ====
Pos	Team	Pld	W	D	L	GF	GA	GD	Pts	Qualification	UTC	CAM	LIB	MOR	SEP
1	UTC	0	0	0	0	0	0	0	0	Regional Semifinals		–	–	–	2–0
2	Carlos A. Mannucci	0	0	0	0	0	0	0	0	Regional Semifinals	–		–	–	1–0
3	Libertad	0	0	0	0	0	0	0	0		1–0	–		–	–
4	Deportivo Morba	0	0	0	0	0	0	0	0		–	–	–		2–1
5	15 de Septiembre	0	0	0	0	0	0	0	0		–	0–0	0–0	0–0	

Legend: Blue = home team win; Yellow = draw; Red = away team win.

==== Regional Semifinals ====
Team 1	Agg.	Team 2	1st leg	2nd leg
Carlos A. Mannucci	1–2	Alianza Atlético	1–0	0–2
Deportivo Pacífico	–	UTC	–	0–3

===== Second leg =====
2 December 1990	UTC	3–0	Deportivo Pacífico	Estadio Héroes de San Ramón, Cajamarca

2 December 1990	Alianza Atlético	2–0	Carlos A. Mannucci	Estadio Campeones del 36, Sullana

==== Regional Final ====
10 December 1990	Alianza Atlético	2–1	UTC	Estadio Campeones del 36, Sullana
	Nataliño; Castillo

17 December 1990	UTC	1–1	Alianza Atlético	Estadio Héroes de San Ramón, Cajamarca
	Herrera 61'		Castellón 32'	Attendance: 4,376

=== Zona Sur ===
==== Group A ====
Pos	Team	Pld	W	D	L	GF	GA	GD	Pts	Qualification	MEL	AUR	COR	JLA	HUR
1	Melgar	0	0	0	0	0	0	0	0	Liguilla		—	—	—	—
2	Aurora	0	0	0	0	0	0	0	0	Liguilla	—		—	—	—
3	Coronel Bolognesi	0	0	0	0	0	0	0	0		—	—		—	—
4	Juvenil Los Ángeles	0	0	0	0	0	0	0	0		—	—	—		—
5	Atlético Huracán	0	0	0	0	0	0	0	0		—	—	—	—	

Legend: Blue = home team win; Yellow = draw; Red = away team win.

==== Group B ====
Pos	Team	Pld	W	D	L	GF	GA	GD	Pts	Qualification	CIE	ALF	DRJ
1	Cienciano	0	0	0	0	0	0	0	0	Liguilla		—	—
2	Alfonso Ugarte	0	0	0	0	0	0	0	0	Liguilla	—		—
3	Diablos Rojos	0	0	0	0	0	0	0	0		—	—	

Legend: Blue = home team win; Yellow = draw; Red = away team win.

==== Liguilla ====
Pos	Team	Pld	W	D	L	GF	GA	GD	Pts	Qualification	MEL	AUR	CIE	ALF
1	Melgar	6	4	2	0	13	5	+8	10	Octogonal		3–1	6–2	2–0
2	Aurora	6	3	2	1	11	6	+5	8		—		4–1	2–0
3	Cienciano	6	1	2	3	8	13	−5	4		0–0	—		—
4	Alfonso Ugarte	6	1	0	5	3	11	−8	2		—	0–2	2–1	

Source: Diario El Comercio 1990
Legend: Blue = home team win; Yellow = draw; Red = away team win.

=== Zona Centro ===
Pos	Team	Pld	W	D	L	GF	GA	GD	Pts	Qualification	ADT	UMI	MSV	LEO	APM	JUN	HUA	AND
1	ADT	14	7	5	2	15	7	+8	19	Octogonal		3–0	–	–	–	–	–	–
2	Unión Minas	14	7	3	4	18	10	+8	17		–		–	–	1–1	–	–	–
3	Mina San Vicente	14	6	2	6	18	11	+7	14		–	–		–	–	–	1–1	–
4	León de Huánuco	13	6	2	5	21	17	+4	14		0–0	–	–		–	–	–	–
5	Alipio Ponce	13	5	3	5	14	22	−8	13		–	–	–	–		–	–	–
6	Deportivo Junín	14	5	2	7	13	20	−7	12		1–1	–	2–1	–	–		–	1–0
7	Unión Huayllaspanca	14	5	2	7	15	25	−10	12		–	–	–	–	3–2	–		–
8	Defensor ANDA	14	3	3	8	13	13	0	9		–	–	–	–	–	–	–	

Source: Diario El Comercio 1990
Legend: Blue = home team win; Yellow = draw; Red = away team win.

=== Zona Oriente ===
Pos	Team	Pld	W	D	L	GF	GA	GD	Pts	Qualification	TAR	CNI	HOS	CHA	BAN	BEL
1	Unión Tarapoto	0	0	0	0	0	0	0	0	Octogonal		–	–	–	–	–
2	CNI	0	0	0	0	0	0	0	0		–		–	–	–	–
3	Deportivo Hospital	0	0	0	0	0	0	0	0		–	–		–	–	–
4	Chacarita Versalles	0	0	0	0	0	0	0	0		0–1	–	–		–	–
5	Deportivo Bancos	0	0	0	0	0	0	0	0		–	–	–	–		–
6	Atlético Belén	0	0	0	0	0	0	0	0		–	–	–	–	–	

Legend: Blue = home team win; Yellow = draw; Red = away team win.

=== Octogonal ===
Team 1	Agg.	Team 2	1st leg	2nd leg
Universitario	6–1	Unión Tarapoto	5–0	1–1
Unión Huaral	2–6	Alianza Atlético	1–1	0–1
ADT	0–7	Alianza Lima	0–1	0–6
Melgar	2–2 (4–5 p)	Sport Boys	2–1	0–1

==== First leg ====
6 January 1991	ADT	0–1	Alianza Lima	Estadio IV Centenario, Huancayo
15:30			Rosinaldo Lopes 3'	Attendance: 8,591; Referee: Sergio Leiblinger

6 January 1991	Melgar	2–1	Sport Boys	Estadio Mariano Melgar, Arequipa
15:30	Néstor Mordini 38'; Gustavo Parmiaggiani 70'		Claudio Adao 87'	Attendance: 15,164; Referee: Fernando Chappell

6 January 1991	Universitario	5–0	Unión Tarapoto	Estadio Teodoro Lolo Fernández, Lima
15:45	Jesús Torrealva 38' 71'; Oswaldo Araujo 48'; Héctor Cedres 60'; Alfonso Yañez 90'			Attendance: 6,512; Referee: Félix Arredondo

6 January 1991	Unión Huaral	1–1	Alianza Atlético	Estadio Nacional, Lima
15:45	Guillermo Ferrari 61' (pen.)		Jorge Gonzáles 88'	Attendance: 3,378; Referee: Carlos Mansilla

==== Second leg ====
13 January 1991	Alianza Atlético	1–0	Unión Huaral	Estadio Miguel Grau, Piura
13:00	Pedro Sanjinéz 68'			Attendance: 8,576; Referee: Alfonso Postigo

13 January 1991	Unión Tarapoto	1–1	Universitario	Estadio Max Augustín, Iquitos
13:00	Fernando Chung 70'		Roberto Martínez 78'	Attendance: 1,494; Referee: José Ramírez

13 January 1991	Alianza Lima	6–0	ADT	Estadio Alejandro Villanueva, Lima
16:00	Fidel Castro 1' 50'; Parcko Quiroz 21'; Rosinaldo Lopes 43'; Ricardo Cano 86'; Julio Altamirano 90'			Attendance: 12,640; Referee: Juan Carlos Espino

13 January 1991	Sport Boys	1–0 (5–4 p)	Melgar	Estadio Teodoro Lolo Fernández, Lima
15:15	Claudio Adao 38'			Referee: Alberto Tejada Jr.
	Penalties
	Carlos Atoche (penalty scored); Roberto Arrelucea (penalty scored); Abel Lobatón (penalty scored); Leoncio Cervera (penalty scored); Claudio Adao (penalty scored)		César Adriazola (penalty scored); Percy Quispe (penalty scored); Marco Echegaray (penalty scored); Julio Begazo (penalty scored); Juvenil Briceño (penalty missed)

Alianza Lima, Alianza Atlético, Sport Boys and Universitario qualified for the Liguilla Final.

=== Liguilla Final ===
==== Standings ====
Pos	Team	Pld	W	D	L	GF	GA	GD	Pts	Qualification	UNI	ALI	SBA	AAS
1	Universitario	3	2	0	1	6	1	+5	4	1991 Copa Libertadores, Title Playoff		0–1	2–0	
2	Alianza Lima	3	2	0	1	4	2	+2	4				3–1	0–1
3	Sport Boys	3	1	0	2	3	5	−2	2					2–0
4	Alianza Atlético	3	1	0	2	1	6	−5	2		0–4			

Legend: Blue = home team win; Yellow = draw; Red = away team win.

==== Results ====
20 January 1991	Alianza Lima	0–1	Alianza Atlético	Estadio Nacional, Lima
18:00			Javier Torres 30'	Referee: Leo Ramírez

20 January 1991	Universitario	2–0	Sport Boys	Estadio Nacional, Lima
20:00	Roberto Martínez 66'; Leo Rojas 76'			Attendance: 44,339; Referee: Sergio Leiblinger

23 January 1991	Sport Boys	2–0	Alianza Atlético	Estadio Nacional, Lima
18:00	Claudio Adao 29'; Martín Ochandarte 84'			Referee: José Ramírez

23 January 1991	Universitario	0–1	Alianza Lima	Estadio Nacional, Lima
20:00			Parcko Quiroz 30'	Attendance: 45,945; Referee: Fernando Chappell

27 January 1991	Alianza Lima	3–1	Sport Boys	Estadio Nacional, Lima
16:00	Ricardo Cano 44'; René Pinto 50' 77' (pen.)		Claudio Adao 43'	Referee: Sergio Leiblinger

27 January 1991	Alianza Atlético	0–4	Universitario	Estadio Nacional, Lima
18:00			Jesús Torrealva 19'; Roberto Martínez 21' 46'; Oswaldo Araujo 31'	Attendance: 45,945; Referee: Jaime Rodríguez

==== Tiebreaker ====
30 January 1991	Universitario	1–0	Alianza Lima	Estadio Nacional, Lima
19:00	Roberto Martínez 34'	Report		Attendance: 45,945; Referee: José Ramírez

== Title Playoff ==
3 February 1991
18:00

Universitario	4–2	Sport Boys
Roberto Martínez 32'; Héctor Cedrés 38'; Jesús Torrealva 59'; Oswaldo Araujo 71'		Pedro Requena 15' (o.g.); Carlos Paris 79'

Estadio Nacional, Lima
Referee: Fernando Chappell

== See also ==
- 1990 Peruvian Segunda División
