= 1989 Torneo Descentralizado =

Torneo Descentralizado
- Season: 1989
- Dates: 18 February 1989
- Champions: Unión Huaral
- Relegated: Deportivo Tintaya; Juan Aurich; San Martín de Porres; Social Magdalena
- Copa Libertadores: Unión Huaral; Sporting Cristal
- Top goalscorer: Carlos Delgado (14 goals)

The 1989 Torneo Descentralizado, the top tier of Peruvian football was played by 42 teams in the format of Regional Tournaments. The national champion was Unión Huaral.

Due to the 1989 Copa América, a minor tournament (1989 Torneo Plácido Galindo) was played during the season by 42 clubs. The winner would qualify for the Liguilla Regional II Playoffs.

== Teams ==
=== Team changes ===
Promoted from 1988 Segunda División	Promoted from 1988 Ligas Regionales	Relegated from 1988 Primera División
▲ Defensor Lima (1st)	▲ Atlético Torino (Región Norte - 1st) ▲ Social Magdalena (Región Centro - 1st) ▲ Atlético Belén (Región Oriente - 1st) ▲ Chacarita Versalles (Región Oriente - 2nd) ▲ Deportivo Hospital (Región Oriente - 3rd) ▲ San Martín de Porres (Región Oriente - 4th) ▲ Unión Tarapoto (Región Oriente - 5th) ▲ Aurora (Región Zur - 1st)	▼ Guardia Republicana (Zona Metropolitana - Playoff) ▼ Hungaritos Agustinos (Zona Norte - 9th) ▼ Deportivo Pucallpa (Zona Centro - 6th) ▼ Alianza Naval (Zona Sur - 8th)

=== Stadia locations ===
Locations of the 1989 Primera División teams

Team	City	Stadium	Capacity
15 de Septiembre	Trujillo	Mansiche	24,000
ADT	Tarma	Unión Tarma	9,000
AELU	Pueblo Libre, Lima	Nacional	45,750
Alfonso Ugarte	Puno	Enrique Torres Belón	20,000
Alianza Atlético	Sullana	Campeones del 36	12,000
Alianza Lima	La Victoria, Lima	Alejandro Villanueva	35,000
Alipio Ponce	Mazamari	Municipal de Mazamari	4,000
Atlético Belén	Moyobamba	IPD de Moyobamba	8,000
Atlético Grau	Piura	Miguel Grau (Piura)	25,000
Atlético Huracán	Moquegua	25 de Noviembre	25,000
Atlético Torino	Talara	Campeonísimo	8,000
Aurora	Arequipa	Mariano Melgar	20,000
Carlos A. Mannucci	Trujillo	Mansiche	24,000
Chacarita Versalles	Iquitos	Max Augustín	24,000
Cienciano	Cusco	Garcilaso	42,056
CNI	Iquitos	Max Augustín	24,000
Coronel Bolognesi	Tacna	Jorge Basadre	19,850
Defensor ANDA	Aucayacu	Municipal de Aucayacu	5,000
Defensor Lima	Breña, Lima	Nacional	45,750
Deportivo Cañaña	Chiclayo	Elías Aguirre	24,500
Deportivo Hospital	Pucallpa	Aliardo Soria	15,000
Deportivo Junín	Huancayo	Huancayo	20,000
Deportivo Municipal	Cercado de Lima	Nacional	45,750
Deportivo Tintaya	Yauri	Manuel Prado de Espinar	10,000
Diablos Rojos	Juliaca	Guillermo Briceño Rosamedina	20,030
Internazionale	San Borja, Lima	Nacional	45,750
Juan Aurich	Chiclayo	Elías Aguirre	24,500
León de Huánuco	Huánuco	Heraclio Tapia	15,000
Libertad	Trujillo	Mansiche	24,000
Melgar	Arequipa	Mariano Melgar	20,000
Meteor Sport	Chancay	Rómulo Shaw Cisneros	13,000
Mina San Vicente	Junín, Peru	Municipal de San Ramón	10,000
Octavio Espinosa	Ica	José Picasso Peratta	8,000
San Agustín	San Isidro, Lima	Nacional	45,750
San Martín de Porres	Pucallpa	Aliardo Soria	15,000
Social Magdalena	Ayacucho	Ciudad de Cumaná	15,000
Sporting Cristal	Rímac, Lima	Nacional	45,750
Unión Huaral	Huaral	Julio Lores Colan	10,000
Unión Minas	Cerro de Pasco	Daniel Alcides Carrión	8,000
Unión Tarapoto	Tarapoto	Carlos Vidaurre García	7,000
UTC	Cajamarca	Héroes de San Ramón	18,000
Universitario	Breña, Lima	Nacional	45,750

== Torneo Regional I ==
=== Zona Metropolitana ===
Pos	Team	Pld	W	D	L	GF	GA	GD	Pts	Qualification or relegation	ALI	CRI	HUA	DLI	UNI	MET	INT	AGU	AEL	OCT	MUN
1	Alianza Lima	10	6	3	1	17	6	+11	15	Liguilla		0–0	0–2			3–0			1–0	3–1	
2	Sporting Cristal	10	5	3	2	23	9	+14	13	Liguilla											6–2
3	Unión Huaral	10	4	5	1	14	10	+4	13	Pre-Liguilla Playoff					0–3						
4	Defensor Lima	10	3	5	2	17	12	+5	11		1–1										
5	Universitario	10	3	5	2	13	11	+2	11		1–1	0–0		0–4		1–2		0–0	2–2	2–2	
6	Meteor Sport	10	4	3	3	10	10	0	11												
7	Internazionale	10	4	2	4	17	17	0	10		1–3				0–2						
8	San Agustín	10	3	3	4	10	15	−5	9		0–3										
9	AELU	10	2	2	6	10	21	−11	6												
10	Octavio Espinosa	10	1	4	5	7	19	−12	6												
11	Deportivo Municipal	10	1	3	6	10	20	−10	5		0–2				0–2						

Legend: Blue = home team win; Yellow = draw; Red = away team win.

=== Zona Centro ===
Pos	Team	Pld	W	D	L	GF	GA	GD	Pts	Qualification or relegation	MSV	JUN	UMI	LEO	ADT	SOC	APM	AND
1	Mina San Vicente	0	0	0	0	0	0	0	0	Liguilla								
2	Deportivo Junín	0	0	0	0	0	0	0	0									
3	Unión Minas	0	0	0	0	0	0	0	0									
4	León de Huánuco	0	0	0	0	0	0	0	0									
5	ADT	0	0	0	0	0	0	0	0									
6	Social Magdalena	0	0	0	0	0	0	0	0									
7	Alipio Ponce	0	0	0	0	0	0	0	0									
8	Defensor ANDA	0	0	0	0	0	0	0	0									

Legend: Blue = home team win; Yellow = draw; Red = away team win.

=== Zona Norte ===
Pos	Team	Pld	W	D	L	GF	GA	GD	Pts	Qualification or relegation	AAS	JAU	UTC	CAM	LIB	CAÑ	TOR	GRA	SET
1	Alianza Atlético	0	0	0	0	0	0	0	0	Liguilla									
2	Juan Aurich	0	0	0	0	0	0	0	0										
3	UTC	0	0	0	0	0	0	0	0										
4	Carlos A. Mannucci	0	0	0	0	0	0	0	0										
5	Libertad	0	0	0	0	0	0	0	0										
6	Deportivo Cañaña	0	0	0	0	0	0	0	0										
7	Atlético Torino	0	0	0	0	0	0	0	0										
8	Atlético Grau	0	0	0	0	0	0	0	0										
9	15 de Setiembre	0	0	0	0	0	0	0	0										

Legend: Blue = home team win; Yellow = draw; Red = away team win.

=== Zona Oriente ===
Pos	Team	Pld	W	D	L	GF	GA	GD	Pts	Qualification or relegation	TAR	CNI	BEL	SMP	HOS	CHA
1	Unión Tarapoto	0	0	0	0	0	0	0	0	Pre-Liguilla Playoff						
2	CNI	0	0	0	0	0	0	0	0							
3	Atlético Belén	0	0	0	0	0	0	0	0							
4	San Martín de Porres	0	0	0	0	0	0	0	0							
5	Deportivo Hospital	0	0	0	0	0	0	0	0							
6	Chacarita Versalles	0	0	0	0	0	0	0	0							

Legend: Blue = home team win; Yellow = draw; Red = away team win.

=== Zona Sur ===
Pos	Team	Pld	W	D	L	GF	GA	GD	Pts	Qualification or relegation	AUR	MEL	CIE	ALF	COR	DRJ	HUR	TIN
1	Aurora	14	8	3	3	25	11	+14	19	Liguilla		2–0	0–0	3–1	0–0	4–1	2–0	2–1
2	Melgar	14	8	1	5	19	8	+11	17		2–0		1–0	0–0	3–0	5–0	1–0	4–1
3	Cienciano	14	6	3	5	20	12	+8	15		1–1	1–0		3–1	2–0	2–1	5–0	3–0
4	Alfonso Ugarte	14	6	2	6	13	14	−1	14		2–1	0–1	1–0		1–0	2–1	2–0	2–0
5	Coronel Bolognesi	14	5	3	6	10	15	−5	13		0–1	1–0	2–1	1–0		2–1	1–1	3–1
6	Diablos Rojos	14	6	1	7	16	22	−6	13		2–0	1–0	2–0	1–0	2–0		1–1	1–0
7	Atlético Huracán	14	4	4	6	11	16	−5	12		0–2	2–0	1–0	1–1	2–0	3–0		0–1
8	Deportivo Tintaya	14	3	3	8	12	28	−16	9		1–7	0–2	2–2	1–0	0–0	3–2	0–0	

Legend: Blue = home team win; Yellow = draw; Red = away team win.

=== Pre-Liguilla playoff ===
26 April 1989	Unión Huaral	2–1	Unión Tarapoto

=== Liguilla ===
==== Standings ====
Pos	Team	Pld	W	D	L	GF	GA	GD	Pts	Qualification or relegation	CRI	AAS	AUR	MSV	ALI	HUA
1	Sporting Cristal	5	1	4	0	3	0	+3	6	1990 Copa Libertadores, Title Playoff		3–0		0–0		0–0
2	Alianza Atlético	5	2	2	1	6	7	−1	6				2–1	0–0	2–1	
3	Aurora	5	1	3	1	5	5	0	5		0–0				2–1	
4	Mina San Vicente	5	0	5	0	2	2	0	5				1–1			1–1
5	Alianza Lima	5	1	2	2	4	4	0	4		0–0			0–0		2–0
6	Unión Huaral	5	0	4	1	4	6	−2	4			2–2	1–1			

Legend: Blue = home team win; Yellow = draw; Red = away team win.

==== Results ====
30 April 1989	Unión Huaral	1–1	Aurora

30 April 1989	Sporting Cristal	3–0	Alianza Atlético

30 April 1989	Alianza Lima	0–0	Mina San Vicente

3 May 1989	Unión Huaral	2–2	Alianza Atlético

3 May 1989	Sporting Cristal	0–0	Mina San Vicente

3 May 1989	Aurora	2–1	Alianza Lima

7 May 1989	Alianza Atlético	0–0	Mina San Vicente

7 May 1989	Alianza Lima	2–0	Unión Huaral

7 May 1989	Sporting Cristal	0–0	Aurora

10 May 1989	Mina San Vicente	1–1	Unión Huaral

10 May 1989	Alianza Atlético	2–1	Aurora

10 May 1989	Alianza Lima	0–0	Sporting Cristal

14 May 1989	Mina San Vicente	1–1	Aurora

14 May 1989	Alianza Atlético	2–1	Alianza Lima

14 May 1989	Sporting Cristal	0–0	Unión Huaral

==== Tiebreaker ====
17 May 1989	Sporting Cristal	2–0	Alianza Atlético	Estadio Nacional, Lima
	César Dall'Orso 24'; Francesco Manassero 87'

Sporting Cristal qualified for the 1990 Copa Libertadores.

== Torneo Plácido Domingo ==
=== Final ===
22 September 1989

Defensor Lima	1–1	Universitario
Waldemar Victorino 80'		Jesús Torrealva 46'

Estadio Nacional, Lima
1 October 1989

Universitario	1–1	Defensor Lima
Andrés Gonzáles 30'		Waldemar Victorino 89'
Penalties
Barco (penalty scored); Carranza (penalty scored); Peña (penalty scored); Vidales (penalty scored); Briceño (penalty missed)	4–5	Ternero (penalty scored); Peña (penalty scored); Zevallos (penalty scored); Saavedra (penalty scored); Waldemar Victorino (penalty scored)

Estadio Nacional, Lima

Defensor Lima qualified for the Torneo Regional II - Liguilla Playoff.

== Torneo Regional II ==
=== Zona Metropolitana ===
Pos	Team	Pld	W	D	L	GF	GA	GD	Pts	Qualification or relegation	UNI	CRI	HUA	ALI	AEL	DLI	INT	MET	OCT	MUN	AGU
1	Universitario	10	7	2	1	24	10	+14	16	Liguilla Playoffs			1–0				3–1			5–3	
2	Sporting Cristal	10	7	2	1	14	3	+11	16	Liguilla Playoffs	2–1			1–0							
3	Unión Huaral	10	5	3	2	9	5	+4	13	Liguilla Playoffs				0–0							
4	Alianza Lima	10	4	3	3	13	9	+4	11		0–1					2–0	2–1			1–1	4–2
5	AELU	10	5	1	4	14	14	0	11		1–3			1–0							
6	Defensor Lima	10	3	3	4	14	14	0	9	Liguilla Playoffs	0–0										
7	Internazionale	10	2	4	4	8	14	−6	8												
8	Meteor Sport	10	2	3	5	6	10	−4	7		1–3			0–0							
9	Octavio Espinosa	10	1	5	4	10	18	−8	7		1–6			2–4							
10	Deportivo Municipal	10	2	2	6	12	18	−6	6												
11	San Agustín	10	1	4	5	6	18	−12	6		1–1										

Legend: Blue = home team win; Yellow = draw; Red = away team win.

=== Zona Norte ===
==== Group A ====
Pos	Team	Pld	W	D	L	GF	GA	GD	Pts	JAU	UTC	CAM	LIB	CAÑ
1	Juan Aurich	0	0	0	0	0	0	0	0					
2	UTC	0	0	0	0	0	0	0	0					
3	Carlos A. Mannucci	0	0	0	0	0	0	0	0					
4	Libertad	0	0	0	0	0	0	0	0					
5	Deportivo Cañaña	0	0	0	0	0	0	0	0					

Legend: Blue = home team win; Yellow = draw; Red = away team win.

==== Group B ====
Pos	Team	Pld	W	D	L	GF	GA	GD	Pts	Qualification or relegation	AAS	TOR	GRA	SET
1	Alianza Atlético	0	0	0	0	0	0	0	0	Liguilla Playoffs				
2	Atlético Torino	0	0	0	0	0	0	0	0					
3	Atlético Grau	0	0	0	0	0	0	0	0					
4	15 de Setiembre	0	0	0	0	0	0	0	0					

Legend: Blue = home team win; Yellow = draw; Red = away team win.

=== Zona Sur ===
Pos	Team	Pld	W	D	L	GF	GA	GD	Pts	Qualification or relegation	AUR	ALF	CIE	DRJ	MEL	HUR	COR	TIN
1	Aurora	14	10	3	1	40	8	+32	23	Liguilla Playoffs		1–0	4–0	2–1	1–0	1–1	6–0	6–0
2	Alfonso Ugarte	14	9	2	3	9	5	+4	20		0–2		1–0	1–0	1–0	1–0	1–0	1–0
3	Cienciano	13	7	3	3	16	12	+4	17		1–0	2–0		1–1	2–1	1–0	4–0	2–1
4	Diablos Rojos	13	4	5	4	17	20	−3	13		0–7	0–1	0–0		1–1	1–0	3–1	5–2
5	Melgar	14	4	4	6	9	11	−2	12		0–3	0–1	2–0	0–0		0–0	1–0	2–0
6	Atlético Huracán	13	1	8	4	10	13	−3	10		2–2	0–0	2–2	—	1–1		1–1	3–1
7	Coronel Bolognesi	12	2	4	6	6	19	−13	8		0–2	0–0	—	1–1	1–0	0–0		—
8	Deportivo Tintaya	13	1	1	11	12	31	−19	3		3–3	0–1	0–1	3–4	0–1	2–0	0–2	

Legend: Blue = home team win; Yellow = draw; Red = away team win.

=== Zona Centro ===
Pos	Team	Pld	W	D	L	GF	GA	GD	Pts	Qualification or relegation	MSV	JUN	UMI	LEO	ADT	SOC	APM	AND
1	Mina San Vicente	0	0	0	0	0	0	0	0	Liguilla Playoffs								
2	Deportivo Junín	0	0	0	0	0	0	0	0									
3	Unión Minas	0	0	0	0	0	0	0	0									
4	León de Huánuco	0	0	0	0	0	0	0	0									
5	ADT	0	0	0	0	0	0	0	0									
6	Social Magdalena	0	0	0	0	0	0	0	0									
7	Alipio Ponce	0	0	0	0	0	0	0	0									
8	Defensor ANDA	0	0	0	0	0	0	0	0									

Legend: Blue = home team win; Yellow = draw; Red = away team win.

=== Zona Oriente ===
Pos	Team	Pld	W	D	L	GF	GA	GD	Pts	Qualification or relegation	CNI	TAR	BEL	SMP	HOS	CHA
1	CNI	0	0	0	0	0	0	0	0	Liguilla Playoffs						
2	Unión Tarapoto	0	0	0	0	0	0	0	0							
3	Atlético Belén	0	0	0	0	0	0	0	0							
4	San Martín de Porres	0	0	0	0	0	0	0	0							
5	Deportivo Hospital	0	0	0	0	0	0	0	0							
6	Chacarita Versalles	0	0	0	0	0	0	0	0							

Legend: Blue = home team win; Yellow = draw; Red = away team win.

=== Liguilla playoffs ===
==== First leg ====
December 1989	Sporting Cristal	0–2	Aurora

20 December 1989	Universitario	2–2	Mina San Vicente

December 1989	Defensor Lima	0–2	CNI

December 1989	Alianza Atlético	1–1	Unión Huaral

==== Second leg ====
December 1989	Aurora	1–2	Sporting Cristal

27 December 1989	Mina San Vicente	0–5	Universitario

December 1989	CNI	1–1	Defensor Lima

December 1989	Unión Huaral	–	Alianza Atlético

Aurora, CNI, Unión Huaral and Universitario qualified for the Liguilla Final.

=== Consolation playoffs ===
==== First leg ====
January 1990	Alianza Atlético	3–1	Sporting Cristal

January 1990	Mina San Vicente	4–2	Defensor Lima

==== Second leg ====
January 1990	Sporting Cristal	1–3 (3–5 p)	Alianza Atlético

January 1990	Defensor Lima	–	Mina San Vicente

Alianza Atlético and Mina San Vicente qualified for the Liguilla Final.

=== Liguilla Final ===
==== Standings ====
Pos	Team	Pld	W	D	L	GF	GA	GD	Pts	Qualification	HUA	UNI	MSV	CNI	AAS	AUR
1	Unión Huaral	5	4	1	0	12	1	+11	9	1990 Copa Libertadores, Title Playoff		1–1	4–0	2–0		2–0
2	Universitario	5	3	2	0	12	3	+9	8				0–0	1–0	3–0	
3	Mina San Vicente	5	3	1	1	7	6	+1	7						1–0	
4	CNI	5	1	1	3	1	5	−4	3				0–2			1–0
5	Alianza Atlético	5	1	1	3	3	9	−6	3		0–3			0–0		3–2
6	Aurora	5	0	0	5	6	17	−11	0			2–7	2–4			

Legend: Blue = home team win; Yellow = draw; Red = away team win.

==== Results ====
21 January 1990	Alianza Atlético	0–0	CNI

21 January 1990	Unión Huaral	2–0	Aurora

21 January 1990	Universitario	0–0	Mina San Vicente

24 January 1990	Mina San Vicente	1–0	Alianza Atlético

24 January 1990	Unión Huaral	2–0	CNI

24 January 1990	Aurora	2–7	Universitario

28 January 1990	Aurora	2–4	Mina San Vicente

28 January 1990	Alianza Atlético	0–3	Unión Huaral

28 January 1990	Universitario	1–0	CNI

31 January 1990	CNI	1–0	Aurora

31 January 1990	Universitario	3–0	Alianza Atlético

31 January 1990	Unión Huaral	4–0	Mina San Vicente

4 February 1990	Alianza Atlético	3–2	Aurora

4 February 1990	CNI	0–2	Mina San Vicente

4 February 1990	Unión Huaral	1–1	Universitario

== Title Playoff ==
8 February 1990

Unión Huaral	1–0	Sporting Cristal
Ernesto Aguirre 115'	Report

Estadio Alejandro Villanueva
Lima
Attendance: 15,075
Referee: José Ramírez Calle

== Aggregate tables (Regional I and Regional II) ==
=== Región Metropolitana ===
Pos	Team	Pld	W	D	L	GF	GA	GD	Pts	Qualification
1	Sporting Cristal	20	12	5	3	37	12	+25	29	
2	Universitario	20	10	7	3	37	21	+16	27	
3	Alianza Lima	20	10	6	4	30	15	+15	26	
4	Unión Huaral	20	9	8	3	23	15	+8	26	
5	Defensor Lima	20	6	8	6	31	26	+5	20	
6	Meteor Sport	20	6	6	8	16	20	−4	18	
7	Internazionale	20	6	6	8	25	31	−6	18	
8	AELU	20	7	3	10	24	35	−11	17	
9	San Agustín	20	4	7	9	16	33	−17	15	Qualification for Relegation playoff
10	Octavio Espinosa	20	2	9	9	17	37	−20	13	
11	Deportivo Municipal	20	3	5	12	22	38	−16	11	

==== Relegation playoff ====
San Agustín	0–0	Juventud La Palma

Juventud La Palma	1–1	San Agustín

San Agustín	1–1 (5–4 PSO)	Juventud La Palma

== See also ==
- 1989 Peruvian Segunda División
