= 1986 Peruvian División Intermedia =

División Intermedia
- Season: 1986

The División Intermedia, the second division of Peruvian football (soccer) in 1984 until 1987. The tournament was played on a home-and-away round-robin basis.

== Metropolitan Region ==
=== Intermedia A ===
Pos	Team	Pld	W	D	L	GF	GA	GD	Pts	Qualification or relegation
1	Internazionale	0	0	0	0	0	0	0	0	1987 Torneo Descentralizado
2	CNI	0	0	0	0	0	0	0	0	1987 Torneo Descentralizado
3	Unión Huaral	0	0	0	0	0	0	0	0	1987 Torneo Descentralizado
4	Juventud La Joya	0	0	0	0	0	0	0	0	1987 Torneo Descentralizado
5	Guardia Republicana	0	0	0	0	0	0	0	0	1987 Segunda División
6	AELU	0	0	0	0	0	0	0	0	1987 Segunda División

== North Region ==
Pos	Team	Pld	W	D	L	GF	GA	GD	Pts	Qualification or relegation
1	Atlético Torino	0	0	0	0	0	0	0	0	1987 Torneo Descentralizado
2	Carlos A. Mannucci	0	0	0	0	0	0	0	0	1987 Torneo Descentralizado
3	Los Espartanos	0	0	0	0	0	0	0	0	1987 Copa Perú
4	UNP	0	0	0	0	0	0	0	0	1987 Copa Perú
5	Libertad	0	0	0	0	0	0	0	0	1987 Copa Perú

== Center Region ==
Pos	Team	Pld	W	D	L	GF	GA	GD	Pts	Qualification or relegation
1	Mina San Vicente	0	0	0	0	0	0	0	0	1987 Torneo Descentralizado
2	Deportivo Junín	0	0	0	0	0	0	0	0	1987 Torneo Descentralizado
3	León de Huánuco	0	0	0	0	0	0	0	0	1987 Copa Perú
4	Universidad San Cristóbal	0	0	0	0	0	0	0	0	1987 Copa Perú

== South Region ==
Pos	Team	Pld	W	D	L	GF	GA	GD	Pts	Qualification or relegation
1	Alfonso Ugarte	0	0	0	0	0	0	0	0	1987 Torneo Descentralizado
2	Atlético Huracán	0	0	0	0	0	0	0	0	1987 Torneo Descentralizado
3	Juvenil Los Ángeles	0	0	0	0	0	0	0	0	1987 Torneo Descentralizado
4	Diablos Rojos	0	0	0	0	0	0	0	0	1987 Copa Perú
5	Mariscal Nieto	0	0	0	0	0	0	0	0	1987 Copa Perú
