= 1987 Torneo Descentralizado =

Torneo Descentralizado
- Season: 1987
- Dates: 15 March 1987 – 26 March 1988
- Champions: Universitario
- Runner up: Alianza Lima
- Relegated: Atlético Torino; Juventud La Palma; Juvenil Los Ángeles; Sport Boys
- Copa Libertadores: Universitario; Alianza Lima
- Top goalscorer: Fidel Suárez (20 goals)

The 1987 Torneo Descentralizado, the top tier of Peruvian football (soccer), was played by 30 teams. The season started in 1987 and ended in early 1988. The national champion was Universitario.

The national championship was divided into two tournaments, the Regional Tournament and the Descentralized Tournament. The winners of each tournament faced off in the final and received the berths for the Copa Libertadores 1988. The Regional Tournament divided the teams into four groups; Metropolitan, North, Central, and South. Each group had its teams qualify for the Regional Finals, the Descentralized Tournament and the Intermediary Division. The Regional Finals determined the Regional Champion. The Descentralized Tournament divided the teams in three groups and had its teams qualify for the Descentralized Liguilla which decided the Descentralized Champion. The Intermediary Division was a promotion/relegation tournament between first and second division teams.

== Teams ==
=== Team changes ===
Promoted from 1986 Copa Perú	Promoted from 1986 División Intermedia	Relegated from 1986 Primera División (1986 División Intermedia)
▲ Deportivo Cañaña (1st)	▲ Internazionale (Intermedia A - 1st) ▲ Mina San Vicente (Zona Centro - 1st) ▲ Juvenil Los Ángeles (Zona Sur - 3rd)	▼ Guardia Republicana (Zona Metropolitana - 5th) ▼ Los Espartanos (Zona Norte - 3rd) ▼ León de Huánuco (Zona Norte - 3rd) ▼ Mariscal Nieto (Zona Sur - 5th)

=== Stadia locations ===
Locations of the 1987 Primera División teams

Team	City	Stadium	Capacity	Field
Alfonso Ugarte	Puno	Enrique Torres Belón	20,000	Grass
Alianza Lima	La Victoria, Lima	Alejandro Villanueva	35,000	Grass
ADT	Tarma	Unión Tarma	9,000	Grass
Atlético Grau	Piura	Miguel Grau (Piura)	25,000	Grass
Atlético Huracán	Moquegua	25 de Noviembre	25,000	Grass
Atlético Torino	Talara	Campeonísimo	8,000	Grass
Carlos A. Mannucci	Trujillo	Mansiche	24,000	Grass
Cienciano	Cusco	Garcilaso	42,056	Grass
CNI	Iquitos	Max Augustín	24,000	Grass
Coronel Bolognesi	Tacna	Jorge Basadre	19,850	Grass
Defensor ANDA	Aucayacu	Municipal de Aucayacu	5,000	Grass
Deportivo Cañaña	Chiclayo	Elías Aguirre	24,500	Grass
Deportivo Junín	Huancayo	Huancayo	20,000	Grass
Deportivo Municipal	Cercado de Lima	Nacional	45,750	Grass
Deportivo Pucallpa	Pucallpa	Aliardo Soria Pérez	15,000	Grass
Hungaritos Agustinos	Iquitos	Max Augustín	24,000	Grass
Internazionale	San Borja, Lima	Nacional	45,750	Grass
Juvenil Los Ángeles	Moquegua	Héroes de Estuquiña	10,000	Grass
Juventud La Palma	Huacho	Segundo Aranda Torres	12,000	Grass
La Joya–Iqueño	Chancay	Rómulo Shaw Cisneros	13,000	Grass
Melgar	Arequipa	Mariano Melgar	20,000	Grass
Mina San Vicente	Junín, Peru	Municipal de San Ramón	10,000	Grass
Octavio Espinosa	Ica	José Picasso Peratta	8,000	Grass
San Agustín	San Isidro, Lima	Nacional	45,750	Grass
Sport Boys	Callao	Miguel Grau	15,000	Grass
Sporting Cristal	Rímac, Lima	Nacional	45,750	Grass
Unión Huaral	Huaral	Julio Lores Colan	10,000	Grass
Unión Minas	Cerro de Pasco	Daniel Alcides Carrión	8,000	Grass
UTC	Cajamarca	Héroes de San Ramón	18,000	Grass
Universitario	Breña, Lima	Nacional	45,750	Grass

== Torneo Regional ==
=== Zona Metropolitana ===
Pos	Team	Pld	W	D	L	GF	GA	GD	Pts	Qualification or relegation	UNI	HUA	AGU	CRI	CNI	ALI	MUN	JOY	INT	SBA	JLP	OCT
1	Universitario	22	13	6	3	37	22	+15	32	Torneo Descentralizado, Liguilla Regional		1–1	1–1	2–1	3–2	0–0	1–0	3–1	2–1	3–2	2–1	3–2
2	Unión Huaral	22	11	10	1	35	18	+17	32	Torneo Descentralizado, Liguilla Regional	0–0		4–2	2–2	0–0	0–0	3–0	1–1	1–1	3–1	3–1	1–0
3	San Agustín	22	11	6	5	33	27	+6	28	Torneo Descentralizado, Liguilla Regional	1–1	1–2		0–4	3–1	2–1	1–0	1–1	1–1	3–1	2–0	1–0
4	Sporting Cristal	22	10	6	6	42	22	+20	26	Torneo Descentralizado	1–2	0–0	0–2		1–1	2–3	3–1	0–0	2–1	4–0	4–0	4–1
5	CNI	22	9	7	6	28	20	+8	25	Torneo Descentralizado	2–1	1–2	2–0	1–1		0–0	0–0	0–1	0–0	5–0	1–0	2–0
6	Alianza Lima	22	7	11	4	23	21	+2	25	Torneo Descentralizado	1–2	3–2	1–1	0–4	1–1		0–0	1–0	1–0	2–2	0–0	2–1
7	Deportivo Municipal	22	7	8	7	28	25	+3	22	Torneo Descentralizado	1–0	1–1	2–3	2–2	3–0	1–1		2–2	2–1	4–0	1–0	4–2
8	La Joya–Iqueño	22	6	8	8	21	24	−3	20	1987 División Intermedia	1–2	1–2	0–0	1–0	0–1	1–0	1–1		1–0	3–1	0–1	2–0
9	Internazionale	22	6	4	12	24	30	−6	16	1987 División Intermedia	1–2	1–2	3–2	1–3	1–2	1–4	1–0	2–1		3–0	2–0	1–1
10	Sport Boys	22	5	5	12	18	44	−26	15	1987 División Intermedia	1–1	0–3	0–1	2–1	0–3	0–0	1–2	1–1	2–1		2–1	1–0
11	Juventud La Palma	22	4	6	12	12	31	−19	14	1987 División Intermedia	0–5	0–0	1–3	0–1	1–0	0–0	2–1	1–1	1–0	0–1		1–1
12	Octavio Espinosa	22	2	5	15	19	36	−17	9	1987 División Intermedia	1–0	1–2	1–2	0–2	2–3	1–2	0–0	4–1	0–1	0–0	1–1	

Updated to match(es) played on unknown. Source:
Legend: Blue = home team win; Yellow = draw; Red = away team win.

==== Tiebreaker ====
26 August 1987
19:30

Universitario	1–0	Unión Huaral
Eduardo Rey Muñóz 30'

Estadio Nacional, Lima
Attendance: 7,181
Referee: César Cachay

=== Zona Norte ===
Pos	Team	Pld	W	D	L	GF	GA	GD	Pts	Qualification or relegation
1	Carlos A. Mannucci	15	8	4	3	25	14	+11	20	Torneo Descentralizado, Liguilla Regional
2	UTC	15	8	1	6	23	17	+6	17	Torneo Descentralizado
3	Hungaritos Agustinos	15	6	4	5	29	30	−1	16	Torneo Descentralizado
4	Atlético Grau	15	5	4	6	22	23	−1	14	1987 División Intermedia
5	Atlético Torino	15	4	5	6	18	23	−5	13	1987 División Intermedia
6	Deportivo Cañaña	15	2	6	7	11	21	−10	10	1987 División Intermedia

==== Results ====
===== Matches 1–10 =====
Home \ Away	GRA	TOR	CAM	CAÑ	HUN	UTC
Atlético Grau		3–1	3–1	1–1	4–4	2–1
Atlético Torino	1–0		1–1	1–1	0–2	3–1
Carlos A. Mannucci	3–1	1–1		1–1	6–1	1–0
Deportivo Cañaña	0–0	2–2	1–1		1–0	2–1
Hungaritos Agustinos	2–2	3–3	2–1	4–2		0–0
UTC	2–0	1–0	2–1	2–0	5–2	

Updated to match(es) played on 1987. Source:
Legend: Blue = home team win; Yellow = draw; Red = away team win.

===== Matches 11–15 =====
Home \ Away	GRA	TOR	CAM	CAÑ	HUN	UTC
Atlético Grau		3–1				
Atlético Torino				2–0		2–0
Carlos A. Mannucci	1–0	3–0		1–0	1–0	2–1
Deportivo Cañaña	0–1					
Hungaritos Agustinos	3–2	2–0		2–0		
UTC	2–0			2–0	3–2	

Updated to match(es) played on 1987. Source:
Legend: Blue = home team win; Yellow = draw; Red = away team win.

=== Zona Centro ===
Pos	Team	Pld	W	D	L	GF	GA	GD	Pts	Qualification or relegation
1	Deportivo Junín	15	8	5	2	26	13	+13	21	Torneo Descentralizado, Liguilla Regional
2	Unión Minas	15	8	3	4	22	14	+8	19	Torneo Descentralizado
3	Deportivo Pucallpa	15	5	6	4	16	15	+1	16	Torneo Descentralizado
4	ADT	15	7	1	7	16	16	0	15	1987 División Intermedia
5	Defensor ANDA	14	4	4	6	12	18	−6	12	1987 División Intermedia
6	Mina San Vicente	14	1	3	10	10	26	−16	5	1987 División Intermedia

==== Results ====
===== Matches 1–10 =====
Home \ Away	ADT	AND	JUN	PUC	MSV	UMI
ADT		1–0	0–1	1–0	3–1	0–1
Defensor ANDA	3–1		0–0	0–0	2–1	2–0
Deportivo Junín	4–1	1–0		2–0	3–1	4–1
Deportivo Pucallpa	1–0	0–0	1–1		4–1	3–0
Mina San Vicente	0–2	1–2	1–1	1–0		0–0
Unión Minas	1–1	3–0	2–1	5–0	3–1	

Updated to match(es) played on 1987. Source:
Legend: Blue = home team win; Yellow = draw; Red = away team win.

===== Matches 11–15 =====
Home \ Away	ADT	AND	JUN	PUC	MSV	UMI
ADT					2–1	
Defensor ANDA	0–1			2–2		
Deportivo Junín	0–3	4–0		2–2	1–1	1–0
Deportivo Pucallpa	1–0				2–0	
Mina San Vicente						
Unión Minas	2–0	3–1		0–0	1–0	

Updated to match(es) played on 1987. Source:
Legend: Blue = home team win; Yellow = draw; Red = away team win.

=== Zona Sur ===
Pos	Team	Pld	W	D	L	GF	GA	GD	Pts	Qualification or relegation
1	Coronel Bolognesi	15	9	4	2	21	9	+12	22	Torneo Descentralizado, Liguilla Regional
2	Alfonso Ugarte	15	5	8	2	15	12	+3	18	Torneo Descentralizado
3	Cienciano	15	6	4	5	18	11	+7	16	Torneo Descentralizado
4	Melgar	15	3	7	5	11	13	−2	13	1987 División Intermedia
5	Atlético Huracán	15	3	6	6	8	13	−5	12	1987 División Intermedia
6	Juvenil Los Ángeles	15	1	7	7	8	23	−15	9	1987 División Intermedia

==== Results ====
===== Matches 1–10 =====
Home \ Away	ALF	HUR	CIE	BOL	JLA	MEL
Alfonso Ugarte		0–0	2–2	2–0	3–3	1–0
Atlético Huracán	1–1		1–0	0–1	0–0	0–0
Cienciano	0–1	0–1		2–0	2–0	1–0
Coronel Bolognesi	1–1	1–0	1–0		3–0	3–1
Juvenil Los Ángeles	0–0	1–0	0–0	2–2		0–0
Melgar	0–0	1–0	0–0	0–0	1–1	

Updated to match(es) played on 1987. Source:
Legend: Blue = home team win; Yellow = draw; Red = away team win.

===== Matches 11–15 =====
Home \ Away	ALF	HUR	CIE	BOL	JLA	MEL
Alfonso Ugarte		3–2	0–2	0–0		0–1
Atlético Huracán			1–1			
Cienciano				1–2	3–0	4–2
Coronel Bolognesi		3–0			3–0	1–0
Juvenil Los Ángeles	0–1	0–1				1–4
Melgar		1–1				

Updated to match(es) played on 1987. Source:
Legend: Blue = home team win; Yellow = draw; Red = away team win.

=== Liguilla Regional ===
==== Standings ====
Pos	Team	Pld	W	D	L	GF	GA	GD	Pts	Qualification	UNI	HUA	AGU	BOL	CAM	JUN
1	Universitario	5	3	1	1	7	3	+4	7	1988 Copa Libertadores, Title play-off			3–2	1–0		3–0
2	Unión Huaral	5	3	1	1	8	4	+4	7		1–0				2–2	
3	San Agustín	5	3	0	2	8	6	+2	6			1–2		1–0		1–0
4	Coronel Bolognesi	5	2	1	2	8	6	+2	5			1–0			2–2	
5	Carlos A. Mannucci	5	1	3	1	8	7	+1	5		0–0		1–3			3–0
6	Deportivo Junín	5	0	0	5	2	15	−13	0			0–3		2–5		

Legend: Blue = home team win; Yellow = draw; Red = away team win.

==== Results ====
30 August 1987	San Agustín	1–0	Coronel Bolognesi	Estadio Nacional, Lima
14:00	José Del Solar 22'			Referee: Enrique Labó

30 August 1987	Unión Huaral	2–2	Carlos A. Mannucci	Estadio Nacional, Lima
16:00	Humberto Rey Muñoz 38'; Domingo Farfán 52'		Carlos Delgado 61'; Sergio Pereyra 78'	Referee: Alfonso Postigo

30 August 1987	Universitario	3–0	Deportivo Junín	Estadio Nacional, Lima
18:00	Pedro Requena 48'; Leoncio Cervera 58'; Juvenal Briceño 76'			Attendance: 16,165; Referee: César Pagano

2 September 1987	Carlos A. Mannucci	1–3	San Agustín	Estadio Nacional, Lima
16:00	Carlos Valdez 74'		José Kajatt 5'; José Pajuelo 16'; Roberto Martínez 48'	Referee: Carlos Montalván

2 September 1987	Deportivo Junín	0–3	Unión Huaral	Estadio Nacional, Lima
18:00			Carlos Leturia 9'; Domingo Farfán 43'; Pedro Paredes 64'	Referee: César Cachay

2 September 1987	Universitario	1–0	Coronel Bolognesi	Estadio Nacional, Lima
20:00	Juvenal Briceño 27'			Attendance: 13,594; Referee: Samuel Alarcón

6 September 1987	Coronel Bolognesi	2–2	Carlos A. Mannucci	Estadio Nacional, Lima
14:00	Ricardo Zegarra 62'; Alfonso Reyna 81'		Carlos Valdez; Sergio Pereyra 46'	Referee: César Pagano

6 September 1987	San Agustín	1–0	Deportivo Junín	Estadio Nacional, Lima
16:00	José Kajatt 58'

6 September 1987	Unión Huaral	1–0	Universitario	Estadio Nacional, Lima
18:00	Domingo Farfán 63'			Attendance: 24,701; Referee: Alfonso Postigo

9 September 1987	Deportivo Junín	2–5	Coronel Bolognesi	Estadio Nacional, Lima
14:00	Benjamín Reyes 31' 35'		Pedro Novella 24'; Mario Cisterna 33' (pen.) 68'; Alfonso Reyna 44' 58'

9 September 1987	Carlos A. Mannucci	0–0	Universitario	Estadio Nacional, Lima
16:00				Referee: César Cachay

9 September 1987	San Agustín	1–2	Unión Huaral	Estadio Nacional, Lima
18:00	José Ziani 84'		Domingo Farfán 41'; Carlos Leturia 78'	Attendance: 15,227; Referee: Carlos Montalván

13 September 1987	Carlos A. Mannucci	3–0	Deportivo Junín	Estadio Nacional, Lima
14:00	Carlos Valdez 10'; Carlos Delgado 62' 64'			Referee: Alfonso Postigo

13 September 1987	Coronel Bolognesi	1–0	Unión Huaral	Estadio Nacional, Lima
16:00	Alfonso Reyna 74'			Referee: José Ramírez

13 September 1987	Universitario	3–2	San Agustín	Estadio Nacional, Lima
18:00	Javier Chirinos 8'; Juvenal Briceño 25'; Eduardo Rey Muñoz 90'		Roberto Martínez 9'; Jose Kajatt 16'	Attendance: 17,443; Referee: César Pagano

==== Tiebreaker ====
16 September 1987	Universitario	2–0	Unión Huaral	Estadio Nacional, Lima
20:00	Juvenal Briceño 65'; Fidel Suarez 83' (pen.)			Attendance: 45,743; Referee: Carlos Montalván

== Torneo Descentralizado ==
=== Standings ===
Pos	Team	Pld	W	D	L	GF	GA	GD	Pts	Qualification
1	Sporting Cristal	30	17	10	3	54	25	+29	44	Liguilla Final, Bonus +2
2	Alianza Lima	30	17	9	4	40	16	+24	43	Liguilla Final, Bonus +1
3	Universitario	30	14	13	3	46	21	+25	41	Liguilla Final
4	Unión Huaral	30	14	11	5	53	36	+17	39	Liguilla Final
5	Coronel Bolognesi	30	12	12	6	37	26	+11	36	Liguilla Final
6	Alfonso Ugarte	30	11	10	9	40	34	+6	32	Liguilla Final
7	CNI	30	10	11	9	34	32	+2	31	
8	Deportivo Municipal	30	12	7	11	38	38	0	31	
9	Cienciano	30	8	11	11	32	37	−5	27	
10	UTC	30	10	5	15	34	33	+1	25	
11	Deportivo Junín	30	8	8	14	31	51	−20	24	
12	Carlos A. Mannucci	30	9	5	16	33	47	−14	23	
13	San Agustín	30	5	12	13	22	31	−9	22	
14	Deportivo Pucallpa	30	8	6	16	24	48	−24	22	
15	Hungaritos Agustinos	30	7	7	16	37	50	−13	21	
16	Unión Minas	30	7	5	18	23	53	−30	19	

=== Results ===
Home \ Away	ALF	ALI	CAM	CIE	CNI	BOL	JUN	MUN	PUC	HUN	AGU	CRI	HUA	UMI	UNI	UTC
Alfonso Ugarte		1–1	3–0	0–0	4–0	0–0	3–1	2–0	3–1	3–0	0–0	3–1	1–1	3–1	1–1	0–0
Alianza Lima	3–0		2–0	1–1	2–1	2–1	2–0	2–0	3–0	2–0	2–0	2–3	0–0	1–0	0–0	1–0
Carlos A. Mannucci	2–3	1–2		1–0	1–0	1–2	1–0	3–1	2–1	4–1	2–2	1–2	0–1	4–0	0–2	0–0
Cienciano	0–1	1–0	1–1		0–0	0–0	3–1	2–3	4–0	1–0	2–1	2–0	1–3	2–0	4–4	2–0
CNI	4–1	2–1	0–1	0–0		1–1	3–1	1–1	3–0	2–1	0–1	0–0	0–0	1–0	1–1	2–0
Coronel Bolognesi	1–0	0–0	3–1	1–0	0–0		1–0	1–0	2–0	3–1	3–0	0–0	2–2	6–1	0–0	2–0
Deportivo Junín	1–1	1–1	2–0	1–1	2–2	2–1		1–2	3–0	3–2	0–0	0–4	3–1	1–0	1–1	2–0
Deportivo Municipal	2–0	0–2	0–3	5–1	0–0	1–1	0–2		4–2	3–1	3–0	0–1	3–1	2–1	0–2	4–0
Deportivo Pucallpa	3–1	0–1	0–0	1–1	3–2	0–0	0–0	2–1		2–0	1–0	1–3	2–2	2–0	0–2	1–0
Hungaritos Agustinos	1–1	1–1	1–1	4–0	0–1	1–0	3–1	0–1	0–0		1–1	3–3	4–1	5–0	1–2	0–1
San Agustín	1–1	0–0	5–0	1–0	0–1	1–2	0–0	0–0	1–2	0–1		0–1	1–1	1–0	0–2	1–1
Sporting Cristal	3–1	3–2	4–1	1–0	4–2	0–0	4–1	5–0	1–0	1–1	0–0		4–2	2–0	0–0	2–0
Unión Huaral	2–0	0–0	2–0	1–1	2–0	4–1	4–0	1–1	1–0	4–2	2–1	2–1		4–1	1–1	1–1
Unión Minas	1–2	0–2	2–1	1–1	2–2	3–0	2–0	0–0	1–0	2–0	1–4	0–0	2–4		1–0	1–0
Universitario	2–1	0–1	2–1	1–0	2–1	2–2	5–0	1–1	5–0	1–2	0–0	0–0	3–1	0–0		2–0
UTC	1–0	0–1	3–0	4–1	1–2	3–1	4–1	0–1	3–0	5–0	2–0	1–1	0–2	3–0	1–2	

Updated to match(es) played on 1987. Source:
Legend: Blue = home team win; Yellow = draw; Red = away team win.

=== Liguilla Final ===
==== Standings ====
Pos	Team	Pld	W	D	L	GF	GA	GD	BP	Pts	Qualification	ALI	HUA	UNI	CRI	BOL	ALF
1	Alianza Lima	5	3	2	0	8	3	+5	1	9	1988 Copa Libertadores, Title play-off		2–2	1–0	2–0		
2	Unión Huaral	5	3	2	0	10	6	+4	0	8				2–0	1–0	2–2	
3	Universitario	5	3	0	2	10	5	+5	0	6					2–1	4–0	4–1
4	Sporting Cristal	5	2	0	3	5	5	0	2	6						1–0	3–0
5	Coronel Bolognesi	5	1	1	3	4	10	−6	0	3		0–2					2–1
6	Alfonso Ugarte	5	0	1	4	5	13	−8	0	1		1–1	2–3				

Legend: Blue = home team win; Yellow = draw; Red = away team win.

==== Results ====
6 March 1988	Alfonso Ugarte	1–1	Alianza Lima	Estadio Nacional, Lima
16:00	José Vásquez 54'		José Velásquez 90'	Referee: José Ramírez

6 March 1988	Universitario	4–0	Coronel Bolognesi	Estadio Nacional, Lima
18:00	Pedro Requena 11'; Javier Chirinos 26'; Fidel Suarez 36' 61'			Referee: Alberto Tejada

6 March 1988	Unión Huaral	1–0	Sporting Cristal	Estadio Nacional, Lima
20:00	Domingo Farfán 46'			Attendance: 27,027; Referee: Walter Barrios

9 March 1988	Unión Huaral	2–2	Coronel Bolognesi	Estadio Nacional, Lima
16:00	Roberto Vega 42'; Domingo Farfán 67'		Alfonso Reyna 50'; Pedro Novella 62'	Referee: José Ramírez

9 March 1988	Sporting Cristal	3–0	Alfonso Ugarte	Estadio Nacional, Lima
18:00	Percy Olivares 33'; Miguel Seminario 55'; Víctor Hurtado 88'			Referee: Enrique Labó

9 March 1988	Alianza Lima	1–0	Universitario	Estadio Nacional, Lima
20:00	José Velásquez 8'			Attendance: 45,245; Referee: Carlos Montalván

13 March 1988	Universitario	4–1	Alfonso Ugarte	Estadio Nacional, Lima
15:00	Juvenal Briceño 1'; Jesús Torrealva 3'; Fidel Suarez 56'; Leonardo Cervera 86'		Máximo Calderón 13'	Referee: Alberto Tejada

13 March 1988	Sporting Cristal	1–0	Coronel Bolognesi	Estadio Nacional, Lima
17:00	Francisco Manassero 31'			Referee: Alfonso Postigo

13 March 1988	Alianza Lima	2–2	Unión Huaral	Estadio Nacional, Lima
19:00	Oswaldo Flores 5' 65'		Carlos Leiva 45'; Domingo Farfán 66'	Attendance: 22,808; Referee: César Pagano

16 March 1988	Alfonso Ugarte	2–3	Unión Huaral	Estadio Nacional, Lima
16:00	Genaro Neyra 6'; José Luis Vásquez 89'		Carlos Leyva 47'; Pedro Ruiz 55'	Referee: José Ramírez

16 March 1988	Coronel Bolognesi	0–2	Alianza Lima	Estadio Nacional, Lima
18:00			José Velásquez 56'; René Pinto 61'	Referee: Walter Barrios

16 March 1988	Universitario	2–1	Sporting Cristal	Estadio Nacional, Lima
20:00	Pedro Requena 46'; Fidel Suarez 66'		Julio César Antón 10'	Attendance: 34,435; Referee: Enrique Labó

20 March 1988	Coronel Bolognesi	2–1	Alfonso Ugarte	Estadio Nacional, Lima
15:00	Mario Cisterna 23'; Alfonso Reyna 79'		Genaro Neyra 43'

20 March 1988	Unión Huaral	2–0	Universitario	Estadio Nacional, Lima
17:00	Jorge Cordero 30'; Sergio Silva 79'			Referee: Sergio Leiblinger

20 March 1988	Alianza Lima	2–0	Sporting Cristal	Estadio Nacional, Lima
19:00	Eugenio La Rosa 22'; Teófilo Cubillas 64'			Attendance: 43,835; Referee: César Pagano

== Title play-off ==
26 March 1988
20:00

Universitario	1–0	Alianza Lima
Fidel Suárez 23'

Estadio Nacional, Lima
Attendance: 33,414
Referee: César Pagano

== Topscorer ==
Player	Nationality	Goals	Club
Fidel Suarez	Peru	20	Universitario

== International competition ==
- Copa Libertadores 1988

Universitario - Second Stage; eliminated by América de Cali.
Alianza Lima - fourth place in Group 5 with 3 points; eliminated.

== See also ==
- 1987 Copa Perú
