= Carlos Delgado (footballer, born 1955) =

Peruvian footballer (born 1959)

Personal information
- Full name: Carlos Anderson Delgado García
- Date of birth: 11 May 1955 (age 71)
- Place of birth: Trujillo, La Libertad, Peru
- Height: 1.74 m (5 ft 9 in)
- Position: Forward

Senior career*
Years	Team	Apps	(Gls)
1984	Deportivo Municipal		
1985–1987	Carlos A. Mannucci		
1988	L.D.U. Portoviejo		
1989–1990	Deportivo Junín		
1990	Audaz Octubrino		
1991	Deportivo Morba		
1992	CNI de Iquitos		
1993	Centro Iqueño		
1994	San Agustín		

Managerial career
- 2000: Carlos A. Mannucci
- 2006–2007: Carlos A. Mannucci
- 2015: Carlos A. Mannucci
- * Club domestic league appearances and goals

Carlos Anderson Delgado García (born 11 May 1955) is a retired Peruvian football player and manager. Nicknamed "Calin", he was known for playing as a forward for Carlos A. Mannucci and Deportivo Junín throughout the 1980s, being known as one of the most important players to emerge from La Libertad as he was the top goal scorer for the 1989 Torneo Descentralizado, tying with Andrés González.

== Career ==
Delgado began his career with Deportivo Municipal for the 1984 season but initially struggled due to not having the resources back in his home department to learn every major technique in football. However, one of the most significant parts of his career came in the following season with his hometown club of Carlos A. Mannucci with his debut being in the match against Sport Pilsen Callao with Delgado himself scoring four goals. During his creer with Los Carlistas, he helped contribute to one of their most successful runs through consistent qualification and success in the Región Norte of the 1985 and 1987 and helped the club escape relegation in 1986.

Following a brief stint with L.D.U. Portoviejo in Ecuador, he returned to Peru to play for Deportivo Junín as his first major success came with scoring a double in a 2–1 victory against Mina San Vicente during the 1989 Torneo Descentralizado. His other goals that season included another double against Social Magdalena on 18 October, the singular winning goal against Unión Minas on 22 October and the second goal in an away match against ADT de Tarma on 25 October under club manager Miguel 'Vikingo' Guzmán. Delgado later ended up as the top goalscorer of the season with 14 goals scored that season.

After another season in Ecuador with Audaz Octubrino in 1990, he was expected to return to Mannucci for the 1991 Torneo Descentralizado but instead played for regional rivals Deportivo Morba as he contributed to the club's success in the final regional system of the Torneo Descentralizado. He spent the 1992 and 1993 seasons with CNI de Iquitos and Centro Iqueño respectively before retiring in 1994 with San Agustín.

== Later life ==
During the 2007 Copa Perú, Delgado had wanted to sign a young Christian Cueva to the senior team of Mannucci due to seeing potential in the future international but economic strife within the club prevented him from spending on an expensive signing on a singular player. He later returned to manage the club for the 2015 season. At the end of the season, he was fired due to poor results with club president Carlos Chávez also later resigning that same season.

Also in 2015, Delgado participated in the Gran Pollada Deportiva Show Bailable organized by his club of Mannucci to participate in the football tournament for players of his generation to compete in.

Delgado had helped contribute economically to a project designed to help children in poorer districts of his home department as he is currently dedicated to the development of youth football there.
