= Torneo Plácido Galindo =

- Founded: 1989
- Region: Peru
- Teams: 42
- Current champions: Defensor Lima
- Most championships: Defensor Lima (1 title)

The Torneo Plácido Galindo was a knockout competition played by 42 football teams. It was held between the 1989-I and 1989-II regional championships, during the participation of the Peruvian national team in the 1989 Copa América and later in the qualifiers for the 1990 FIFA World Cup in Italy, and featured the clubs of the 1989 Primera División. Defensor Lima won the tournament and qualified for the Regional II's Liguilla Playoffs of the 1989 Torneo Descentralizado. The tournament was named in honor of Peruvian player, international, coach, and football official Plácido Galindo.

== Champions ==
Ed.	Season	Winner	Score	Runner-up	Location
1	1989	Defensor Lima	1–1	Universitario	Nacional, Lima
1	1989	Defensor Lima	1–1 (5–4 p)	Universitario	Nacional, Lima

== Titles by club ==
Club	Winners	Runners-up	Winning years	Runners-up years
Defensor Lima	1	0	1989	—
Universitario	0	1	—	1989
