= Deportivo Tintaya =

- Full name: Club Deportivo Tintaya
- Nickname(s): Los Mineros
- Founded: 2 May 1972
- Ground: Estadio Túpac Amaru, Sicuani
- Capacity: 9,000
- League: Copa Perú
Home colours

Deportivo Tintaya is a Peruvian association football club, playing in the city of Yauri, Cusco.

The club was founded 2 May 1972 and plays in the Copa Perú, which is the third division of the Peruvian league.

== History ==
In the 1986 Copa Perú, the club qualified for the Final Stage, but was eliminated by Deportivo Cañaña, Félix Donayre, Deportivo Camaná, and Chanchamayo.

The club has played at the highest level of Peruvian football on two occasions, from 1988 Torneo Descentralizado until 1989 Torneo Descentralizado, when it was relegated.

== Honours ==
=== Regional ===
- Región VII: 0

Runner-up (1): 1999

- Liga Departamental del Cusco: 1

Winners (1): 1985

- Liga Distrital de Espinar: 0

Runner-up (1): 2012

== See also ==
- List of football clubs in Peru
- Peruvian football league system
