= Fernelly Castillo =

Equatorial Guinea footballer (born 1988)

Personal information
- Full name: Fernelly Alfonso Castillo Barona
- Date of birth: 5 August 1988 (age 38)
- Place of birth: Cali, Colombia

Senior career*
Years	Team	Apps	(Gls)
–2007	Deportivo Cali		
2008–2011	Ninches FC		
2012–2015	The Panthers		
2016	Unión Tarapoto	1	(0)

International career
2012	Equatorial Guinea	1	(0)
- * Club domestic league appearances and goals

Fernelly Alfonso Castillo Barona (born 5 August 1988) is a former footballer who is last known to have played as a defender or midfielder for Unión Tarapoto. Born in Colombia, he was an Equatorial Guinea international.

== Career ==
Before the 2016 season, Castillo signed for Peruvian second-tier side Unión Tarapoto, where he made one league appearance and scored 0 goals. On 15 May 2016, he debuted for Unión Tarapoto during a 1–3 loss to Los Caimanes.
