= Atlético Belén =

- Full name: Club Social Atlético Belén
- Nickname: Los Belenitas
- Founded: April 20, 1960
- Ground: Estadio IPD de Moyobamba, Moyobamba
- Capacity: 8,000
- Chairman: (Peru) César Suárez Baza
- League: Copa Perú
Home colours	Away colours

Atlético Belén is a Peruvian football club based in the city of Moyobamba, San Martín, Peru.

== History ==
Atlético Belén was the 2002 Liga Departamental champion.

The club has played at the highest level of Peruvian football on two occasions, from 1989 Torneo Descentralizado until 1990 Torneo Descentralizado when it was relegated.

In the 2002 Copa Perú, the club reached the Regional Stage but was eliminated by Colegio Nacional Iquitos, while in the 2010 Copa Perú, the club got through to the Departamental Stage, but was defeated by Unión Comercio in the final.

== Honours ==
=== Regional ===
- Liga Departamental de San Martín:

Winners (2): 1966, 2002
Runner-up (1): 2010

- Liga Provincial de Moyobamba:

Winners (5): 1966, 1968, 1974, 2002, 2009
Runner-up (2): 2010, 2013

- Liga Distrital de Moyobamba:

Winners (3): 2001, 2008, 2013

== See also ==
- List of football clubs in Peru
- Peruvian football league system
