= 1986 Copa Perú =

Copa Perú
- Season: 1986
- Champions: Deportivo Cañaña
- Top goalscorer: Segundo Celis (4)

The 1986 Copa Perú season (Spanish: Copa Perú 1986), the promotion tournament of Peruvian football.

In this tournament after many qualification rounds, each one of the 24 departments in which Peru is politically divided, qualify a team. Those teams enter in the Regional round (8 groups) by geographical proximity. Some winners went to the Division Intermedia and some others with some runners-up went to the National round and then to the Final round, staged in Lima (the capital).

The champion was promoted to 1987 Torneo Descentralizado.

== Finalists teams ==
The following list shows the teams that qualified for the Final Stage.

Department	Team	Location
Arequipa	Deportivo Camaná	Camaná
Cusco	Deportivo Tintaya	Yauli
Ica	Félix Donayre	Ica
Junín	Chanchamayo	La Merced
Lambayeque	Deportivo Cañaña	Lambayeque
San Martín	7 de Agosto	Moyobamba

== Final Stage ==
=== Standings ===
Pos	Team	Pld	W	D	L	GF	GA	GD	Pts	Promotion
1	Deportivo Cañaña (C)	5	4	1	0	12	2	+10	9	1987 Torneo Descentralizado
2	Félix Donayre	5	3	1	1	4	2	+2	7	
3	Deportivo Camaná	5	2	2	1	4	3	+1	6	
4	Chanchamayo	5	1	3	1	8	5	+3	5	
5	Deportivo Tintaya	5	1	0	4	3	13	−10	2	
6	7 de Agosto	5	0	1	4	3	10	−7	1	

(C) Champions

=== Round 1 ===
30 November 1986	Deportivo Camaná	0–0	Chanchamayo	Nacional, Lima

30 November 1986	Deportivo Tintaya	1–0	7 de Agosto	Nacional, Lima

30 November 1986	Deportivo Cañaña	1–0	Félix Donayre	Nacional, Lima

=== Round 2 ===
3 December 1986	Deportivo Cañaña	4–0	Deportivo Tintaya	Nacional, Lima

3 December 1986	Deportivo Camaná	2–1	7 de Agosto	Nacional, Lima

3 December 1986	Félix Donayre	2–1	Chanchamayo	Nacional, Lima

=== Round 3 ===
7 December 1986	Chanchamayo	5–1	Deportivo Tintaya	Nacional, Lima

7 December 1986	Deportivo Cañaña	5–1	7 de Agosto	Nacional, Lima

7 December 1986	Félix Donayre	0–0	Deportivo Camaná	Nacional, Lima

=== Round 4 ===
10 December 1986	Chanchamayo	1–1	7 de Agosto	Nacional, Lima

10 December 1986	Félix Donayre	1–0	Deportivo Tintaya	Nacional, Lima

10 December 1986	Deportivo Cañaña	1–0	Deportivo Camaná	Nacional, Lima

=== Round 5 ===
14 December 1986	Deportivo Camaná	2–1	Deportivo Tintaya	Nacional, Lima

14 December 1986	Félix Donayre	1–0	7 de Agosto	Nacional, Lima

14 December 1986	Deportivo Cañaña	1–1	Chanchamayo	Nacional, Lima
