= 15 de Septiembre de Trujillo =

15 de Septiembre
- Full name: Club 15 de Septiembre
- Ground: Mansiche, Trujillo, Peru
- League: Copa Perú

15 de Septiembre was a Peru football club, located in the city of Trujillo, La Libertad. The club was founded with the name of Club 15 de Septiembre.

== History ==
The club has played at the highest level of Peruvian football on three occasions, in the 1988 Torneo Descentralizado until 1990 Torneo Descentralizado, when it was relegated.

== Honours ==
=== Regional ===
- Liga Departamental de La Libertad: 0

Runner-up (1): 1987

== See also ==
- List of football clubs in Peru
- Peruvian football league system
