= Deportivo Junín =

- Full name: Club Deportivo Junín
- Nickname: Los naranjas
- Founded: 27 November 1962; 63 years ago
- Ground: Estadio Huancayo, Huancayo
- League: Copa Perú
Home colours	Away colours

Deportivo Junín is a Peruvian football club, playing in the city of Huancayo, Peru. The club is the biggest of Huancayo city, and plays in the Copa Perú which is the third division of the Peruvian league.

== History ==
=== Early Years ===
Deportivo Junín was founded on November 27, 1962, in Huancayo by residents from the city of Junín. Between 1963 and 1964, the club competed in the Third Division of Huancayo, winning the title and earning promotion to the local Second Division, where it remained for the next three seasons. In 1967, it won another championship and was promoted to the First Division of Huancayo, finishing as runner-up for three consecutive years before finally claiming the title in 1971.

That same year, the club began an outstanding campaign in the 1972 Copa Perú, advancing all the way to the Final Stage, where the top two teams earned promotion. After the championship was secured by Atlético Grau, the Huancayo side contested the second promotion spot against regional rival León de Huánuco, which won 3–2 and temporarily delayed Junín’s dream of reaching the top flight.

Promotion was finally achieved in 1974, when the First Division expanded to 22 teams. Deportivo Junín was one of the eight regional champions of the Copa Perú. Led by Argentine Eloy Martín Tojo — who simultaneously served as goalkeeper and head coach — the club advanced with a series of high-scoring victories and ultimately won the regional title after defeating Estudiantes Unidos de Huancavelica 5–1 in Huancayo and losing 1–0 in the second leg away from home.

=== First Division ===
The Huancayo side made its debut in the Peruvian Primera División on March 24, 1974, in Arequipa, where it suffered a 1–0 defeat against FBC Piérola, another recently promoted club. Deportivo Junín struggled to secure its first victory, recording three draws and four losses in the opening seven rounds of the Descentralizado tournament. Its first win finally came in the eighth round, on May 12, with a 2–0 victory over Carlos A. Mannucci in Huancayo.

The club had as many as four managers during that inaugural campaign: Juan De La Vega, Óscar Montalvo, Orlando Calle, and Ricardo Alfaro.

=== The Campaigns ===
Deportivo Junín was generally known for finishing in the middle of the table during its campaigns in the Peruvian top flight. The club rarely qualified for the championship play-offs and was also not often involved in relegation battles. Its best season came in 1975 when, led by “La Foca” Mario Gonzales, it finished sixth and qualified for the championship liguilla. However, under interim manager José Julio Villanueva, the team ended the final stage in last place.

In 1982, the club found itself seriously threatened by relegation after finishing at the bottom of the overall standings. Fortunately for Deportivo Junín, there was no direct relegation that season. Instead, the club had to contest a relegation play-off against Ramón Castilla de La Oroya and secured its place in the top division comfortably, winning 5–0 at home and losing 2–0 away.

The Regional tournaments era, however, allowed Deportivo Junín to add several titles to its honors list, as it won the Central Zone championship in 1987, 1988, and the first Regional tournament of 1990.

To this day, Deportivo Junín remains the Huancayo club with the highest position in the historical table of Peruvian national championships, ranking 19th overall. It is followed by Sport Huancayo (30th), Deportivo Wanka (31st), and Unión Huayllaspanca (70th). Of those clubs, Unión Huayllaspanca was the only one Deportivo Junín faced in the First Division; their last meeting took place on November 18, 1990, with Huayllaspanca winning 1–0. Nevertheless, throughout its seventeen seasons in the top flight, Deportivo Junín’s fiercest regional rivalry was against ADT de Tarma.

=== The Tragedy ===
Tragedy struck Deportivo Junín on December 14, 1976, at the Estadio Nacional during an away match against Club Atlético Chalaco. Midway through the game, Ángel Vicente Avilés, a Deportivo Junín player, suddenly collapsed on the field. Despite attempts to revive him, nothing could be done. The heart attack proved fatal, leaving an unforgettable mark on those who witnessed the incident live and on the pages of Peruvian football history. Without a doubt, Avilés’ death remains one of the most dramatic events ever remembered in Peruvian football.

=== Name Change ===
During the 1980s, Deportivo Junín frequently dominated the Central Regional tournament, which allowed the club to compete against the country’s top teams and even qualify for the Final Liguilla of the Descentralizado championship.

Between 1983 and 1985, the club adopted the name Huancayo FC.

In 1986, the institution reverted to the name Deportivo Junín. However, the club did not enjoy much success that season and was forced to compete in the Intermedia tournament.

=== Suspension ===
In 1990, it was discovered that Deportivo Junín — along with Defensor ANDA de Aucayacu and Alipio Ponce de Mazamari, both of which no longer had anything at stake in the championship — had falsified match reports for games that were never played in order to avoid travel expenses. As a result of the scandal, the three clubs, together with Chacarita Versalles de Iquitos, were relegated from the First Division, which the following year would be contested by “only” 41 teams, marking the beginning of the end of the Regional Championships in Peru.

Following the scandal, Deportivo Junín was banned from participating in any competition for five years.

In 1998, the club merged with Meteor Sport Club to form Meteor-Junín. The new team used the same kit as Social Deportivo Junín and competed in the Peruvian Segunda División. The side finished in fourth place that season, but withdrew from the competition the following year.

=== Refoundation ===
On August 20, 2000, Deportivo Junín de Ocopilla was refounded and returned to the Liga Distrital de Huancayo, continuing to wear its traditional orange kit.

In 2002, the club won the district and provincial championships and finished as runner-up at the departmental level after losing the final to Sport Dos de Mayo de Tarma. The following year, Deportivo Junín reached the departmental semifinals, but was eliminated by Echa Muni de Pampas.

In 2011, the club failed to appear for two matches in the Huancayo League and was consequently relegated.

In 2016, the club was relaunched as ETE Deportivo Junín and competed in the Huancayo Second Division, where it earned promotion to the District First Division. However, the following year it finished in last place in the District League and returned to the Second Division. In 2018, the club secured another promotion to the District First Division after finishing second in its group in the district-level Second Division tournament.

== Honours ==
=== Senior titles ===
Keys

- Record
- ^{(s)} Shared record

Type	Competition	Titles	Runner-up	Winning years	Runner-up years
Half-year / Short tournament (League)	Torneo Zona Centro	3	4	1987, 1988, 1990–I	1984, 1985, 1989–I, 1989–II
Regional (League)	Región Centro	1	—	1972	—
Regional (League)	Liga Departamental del Junín	2	1	1971, 1973	2002
Regional (League)	Liga Provincial de Huancayo	4	—	1973, 2002, 2003, 2005	—
Regional (League)	Liga Distrital de Huancayo	3	5	1971, 2002, 2009	1968, 1969, 1970, 2008, 2024
Regional (League)	Segunda División Distrital de Huancayo	2	1	1967, 2016	2018
Regional (League)	Tercera División Distrital de Huancayo	1	—	1964	—

== See also ==
- List of football clubs in Peru
- Peruvian football league system
