= Deportivo Camaná =

- Full name: Club Social Deportivo Camaná
- Founded: August 20, 1949; 77 years ago
- Ground: Estadio 9 de Noviembre, Camaná
- League: Copa Perú
| Home colours | Away colours |

Club Social Deportivo Camaná (sometimes referred as Deportivo Camaná) is a Peruvian football club, playing in the city of Camaná, Arequipa, Peru.

== History ==
The Club Deportivo Camaná was founded on August 20, 1949.

In 1986 Copa Perú, the club qualified to the Final Stage, but was eliminated when it finished in 3rd place.

In 2003 Copa Perú, the club qualified to the Departamental Stage, but was eliminated by Deportivo Sipesa.

In 2009 Ligas Superiores del Peru, the club was eliminated when it finished in 9th place.

In 2012 Copa Perú, the club qualified to the Departamental Stage, but was eliminated by José Granda in the Second Stage.

== Honours ==
=== Regional ===
- Liga Departamental de Arequipa:

Winners (5): 1981, 1984, 1985, 1988, 1989
Runner-up (1): 1996

- Liga Provincial de Camaná:

Winners (3): 1996, 2001, 2003
Runner-up (2): 2012, 2025

- Liga Distrital de Camaná:

Winners (4): 1996, 2003, 2012, 2022
Runner-up (2): 2016, 2025, 2026

== See also ==
- List of football clubs in Peru
- Peruvian football league system
