= 1987 Copa Perú =

Copa Perú
- Season: 1987
- Champions: Libertad
- Top goalscorer: Jorge Aponte (3)

The 1987 Copa Perú season (Spanish: Copa Perú 1987), the promotion tournament of Peruvian football.

In this tournament after many qualification rounds, each one of the 24 departments in which Peru is politically divided, qualify a team. Those teams enter the Regional round (8 groups) by geographical proximity. Some winners went to the Division Intermedia and some others with some runners-up went to the National round and then to the Final round. In this edition, for the first time, the Final was not played in Lima, but in Trujillo, and only 4 teams participated. Matches were played in 1988.

The champion was promoted to 1988 Torneo Descentralizado.

== Finalists teams ==
The following list shows the teams that qualified for the Final Stage.

Department	Team	Location
La Libertad	Libertad	Trujillo
Loreto	Capitán Clavero	Iquitos
Puno	Bancos Unidos	Juliaca
Ucayali	San Martín de Porres	Pucallpa

== Final Stage ==
=== Standings ===
Pos	Team	Pld	W	D	L	GF	GA	GD	Pts	Promotion
1	Libertad (C)	3	2	1	0	3	0	+3	5	1988 Torneo Descentralizado
2	Capitán Clavero	3	2	1	0	4	2	+2	5	
3	Bancos Unidos	3	1	0	2	2	4	−2	2	
4	San Martín de Porres	3	0	0	3	1	4	−3	0	

(C) Champions

=== Round 1 ===
20 February 1988	Bancos Unidos	1–0	San Martín de Porres	Nacional, Lima

20 February 1988	Libertad	0–0	Capitán Clavero	Nacional, Lima

=== Round 2 ===
24 February 1988	Capitán Clavero	2–1	San Martín de Porres	Nacional, Lima

24 February 1988	Libertad	2–0	Bancos Unidos	Nacional, Lima

=== Round 3 ===
27 February 1988	Capitán Clavero	2–1	Bancos Unidos	Nacional, Lima

27 February 1988	Libertad	1–0	San Martín de Porres	Nacional, Lima

=== Title Playoff ===
1 March 1988	Libertad	2–0	Capitán Clavero	Nacional, Lima
