= San Martín de Porres de Pucallpa =

Football club based in Pucallpa, Peru

San Martín de Porres
- Full name: Club Deportivo San Martín de Porres
- Nickname(s): Los Santos, Los Carasucias
- Founded: April 9, 1964
- Ground: Aliardo Soria, Pucallpa
- Capacity: 15,000
- League: Copa Perú
Home colours	Away colours

San Martín de Porres is a Peruvian football club, playing in the city of Pucallpa, Ucayali, Peru.

The club was founded 1964 and plays in the Copa Perú, which is the third division of the Peruvian league.

== History ==
The club has played at the highest level of Peruvian football on two occasions, from 1989 Torneo Descentralizado until 1990 Torneo Descentralizado, when it was relegated.

In the 1998 Copa Perú, the club qualified to the Regional Stage, but was eliminated.

== Honours ==
=== National ===
- Liga Departamental de Ucayali: 3

Winners (3): 1996, 1997, 1998

== See also ==
- List of football clubs in Peru
- Peruvian football league system
