= Unión Tarapoto =

Peruvian football club

- Full name: Club Social Deportivo Unión Tarapoto
- Founded: 1955
- Ground: Carlos Vidaurre García, San Martín
- Capacity: 8,000
- Chairman: Daniel Escalante Gómez
- Manager: Jorge Cordero
- League: Copa Perú
- 2016: Peruvian Segunda División, 16th (relegated)
Home colours	Away colours

Unión Tarapoto is a Peruvian football club that plays in the city of Tarapoto, San Martín, Peru.

== Former players ==
- (Equatorial Guinea) Fernelly Castillo

== Honours ==
=== Regional ===
- Región II:

Runner-up (1): 2007

- Liga Departamental de San Martín:

Winners (5): 1979, 1980, 1987, 2009, 2018
Runner-up (4): 1994, 2007, 2015, 2023

- Liga Provincial de San Martín:

Winners (6): 2007, 2009, 2015, 2018, 2023, 2024

- Liga Distrital de Tarapoto:

Winners (7): 2009, 2010, 2015, 2017, 2018, 2019, 2023, 2026
Runner-up (2): 2011, 2012

== See also ==
- List of football clubs in Peru
- Peruvian football league system
- 1989 Torneo Plácido Galindo
