= Chacarita Versalles =

Peruvian football club

- Full name: Sport Club Chacarita Versalles
- Founded: 1942
- Ground: Estadio Max Augustín; Iquitos
- Capacity: 24,000
- League: Copa Perú
Home colours

Chacarita Versalles is a Peruvian football club, playing in the city of Iquitos, Loreto, Peru.

== History ==
The club has played at the highest level of Peruvian football on two occasions, from 1989 Torneo Descentralizado until 1990 Torneo Descentralizado, when it was relegated.

== See also ==
- List of football clubs in Peru
- Peruvian football league system
