= Libertad de Trujillo =

Libertad
- Full name: Club Libertad de Trujillo
- Founded: 11 September 1887; 138 years ago
- Ground: Mansiche, Trujillo, Peru
- League: Copa Perú
Home colours

Libertad is a Peruvian club, located in the city of Trujillo, La Libertad. The club was founded with the name of Club Libertad de Trujillo. It was founded in 1939 and is widely recognized for organizing the National Marinera Contest as part of the Trujillo Marinera Festival. The club also participated in the Copa Perú.

== History ==
Club Libertad de Trujillo was founded in 1887, taking its name in tribute to the Department of La Libertad, the region from which the institution originated and with which it strongly identifies. From its early years, the club actively participated in the Liga Distrital de Trujillo, establishing itself as one of the city’s traditional football institutions. Its greatest sporting achievement came in the 1987 Copa Perú, when it won the national title and earned promotion, for the first time in its history, to the Peruvian First Division for the 1988 season. During its stay in the top flight, the club constantly battled to avoid relegation until 1991, when it finished last in the Northern Zone and was relegated back to its local league.

Alongside its football history, the club also left an important cultural legacy. In 1960, it promoted the creation of a Marinera Contest with the aim of preserving and spreading the traditional dance of the La Libertad region. Over the years, the competition grew in prestige and popularity, eventually becoming one of the most representative cultural events in Peru.

== Honours ==
=== National ===
- Copa Perú: 1

1987

== See also ==
- List of football clubs in Peru
- Peruvian football league system
