= Alipio Ponce de Mazamari =

Alipio Ponce
- Full name: Club Deportivo Alipio Ponce Vasquez
- Nickname: El equipo policial
- Founded: June 21, 1979
- Ground: Estadio Municipal de Mazamari, Mazamari
- Chairman: Eduardo Asca
- League: Copa Perú
- 2017: Eliminated in Departamental Stage
| Home colours | Away colours |

Alipio Ponce is a Peruvian football club based in the city of Mazamari, Satipo, Junín, Peru.

The club is the biggest of Mazamari city.

The club play in the Copa Perú which is the third division of the Peruvian league.

== History ==
The club have played at the highest level of Peruvian football on three occasions, from 1988 Torneo Descentralizado until 1990 Torneo Descentralizado, when it was relegated.

== Honours ==
=== Regional ===
- Región V:

Winners (1): 2013

- Liga Departamental de Junín:

Winners (3): 1987, 2012, 2013
Runner-up (1): 2016

- Liga Provincial de Satipo:

Winners (10): 2009, 2010, 2011, 2012, 2013, 2014, 2016, 2017, 2018, 2022

- Liga Distrital de Mazamari:

Winners (12): 2009, 2010, 2011, 2012, 2013, 2015, 2017, 2018, 2019, 2022, 2025, 2026

== See also ==
- List of football clubs in Peru
- Peruvian football league system
