= Estadio Huancayo =

Multipurpose stadium in Huancayo, Peru

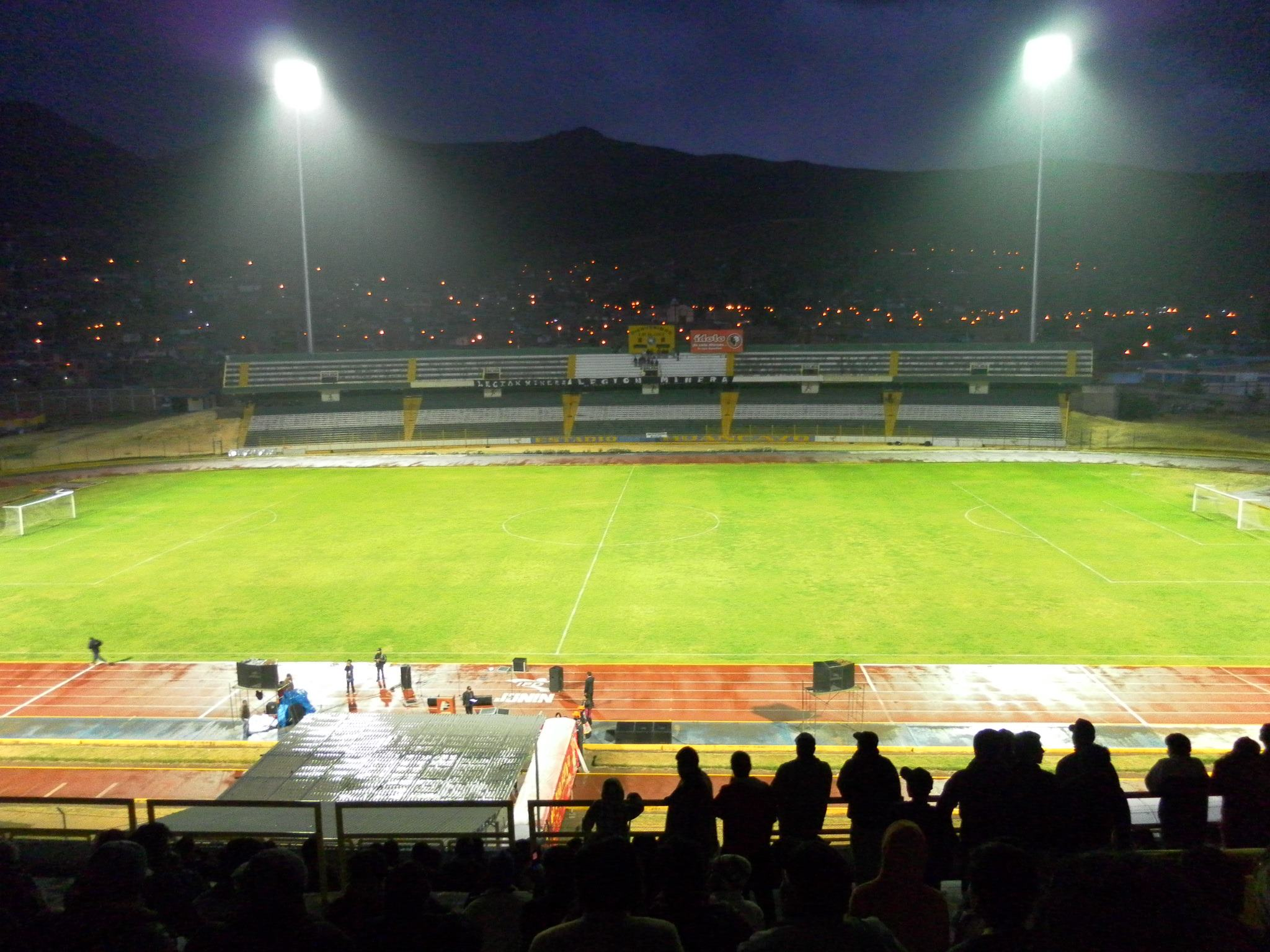
- Interactive map of Estadio Huancayo
- Former names: Estadio IV Centenario (1962-2005)
- Location: Huancayo, Peru
- Coordinates: 12°4′22″S 75°12′7″W
- Owner: Instituto Peruano del Deporte
- Operator: Club Sport Huancayo
- Capacity: 15,000 (1962–2008); 20,000 (2008–2009); 17,000 (2009–2012); 20,000 (2012–present)
- Surface: Grass

Construction
- Opened: 1962

Tenants
- Deportivo Junín (1962–present); Club Sport Huancayo (2008–present)

Estadio Huancayo is a multi-purpose stadium in Huancayo, Peru. It is currently used for football matches and is the home of the Club Sport Huancayo of the Peruvian Primera División, as well as the Deportivo Junín. Other teams that previously used the stadium are Deportivo Wanka and Meteor Junin. The stadium holds 20,000 seats.
