= Circolo Sportivo Internazionale San Borja =

Peruvian football club

Internazionale
- Full name: Circolo Sportivo Internazionale San Borja
- Nickname: "Inter"
- Founded: 1986
- Ground: Estadio Nacional; Lima, Peru
- Capacity: 45.000
- League: Peruvian Segunda División
- 1992: 12°
| Home colours | Away colours |

Internazionale was a Peruvian football club, playing in the city of San Borja, Lima, Peru.

== History ==
The club was the 1986 Peruvian Segunda División champion.

The club has played at the highest level of Peruvian football on five occasions, from 1987 Torneo Descentralizado until 1991 Torneo Descentralizado, when it was relegated.

In the 1992 Segunda División Peruana, the club was relegated to the Copa Perú.

== Honours ==
=== National ===
- Peruvian Segunda División: 1

Winners (1): 1986

== See also ==
- List of football clubs in Peru
- Peruvian football league system
