= Defensor ANDA =

- Full name: Club Defensor Asociación Nacional de Agricultores
- Founded: June 24, 1977
- Ground: Municipal de Aucayacu, Aucayacu
- Capacity: 5,000
- League: Copa Perú
Home colours	Away colours

Defensor ANDA is a Peruvian football club, playing in the city of Huánuco, Peru.

The club is the biggest of Aucayacu city, and one of the biggest in Leoncio Prado Province.

The club was founded on 24 June 1977 and plays in the Copa Perú, which is the third division of the Peruvian league.

== History ==
El Club Defensor A.N.D.A. (Asociación Nacional De Agricultores) is a football club of the city of Aucayacu, in the Leoncio Prado Province, in Huánuco, Peru.

The club has played at the highest level of Peruvian football on seven occasions, from 1984 Torneo Descentralizado until 1990 Torneo Descentralizado, when it was relegated to the Copa Perú.

== See also ==
- List of football clubs in Peru
- Peruvian football league system
