= Deportivo Cañaña =

- Full name: Club Deportivo Cañaña
- Nickname: Verdes
- Founded: 1979
- Ground: Estadio César Flores, Lambayeque
- Capacity: 8,000
- League: Copa Perú
Home colours	Away colours

Club Deportivo Cañaña is a Peruvian football club, playing in the city of Lambayeque, Peru.

== History ==
Deportivo Cañaña was founded on July 19, 1979, by a group of people from Lambayeque, including the Monsalve brothers, Claudio Velarde, Jorge Piscoya, and Rafael Aíta. The club adopted the name “Cañaña,” which was the nickname of Miguel Monsalve.

The team reached the Copa Perú final for the first time in 1983, finishing tied for first place alongside Sport Pilsen Callao of Guadalupe and Barcelona of Surquillo. However, the championship and promotion were decided based on the results obtained among the three clubs involved, a criterion that favored Sport Pilsen despite Deportivo Cañaña having the best goal difference in the tournament.

In 1986, Deportivo Cañaña once again reached the final hexagonal stage of the Copa Perú and was crowned champion in undefeated fashion under the management of Eduardo Rodríguez. The starting lineup featured Ángel Rubiños, Luis Barandiarán, Manuel Deza, Rolando Rojas, Manuel Juárez, Eduardo Cosmópolis, Luis Silva, Carlos Monsalve, Manuel Suárez Osorio, Santiago Samamé —known as “Gato” Samamé and regarded as one of the best players of that year’s Copa Perú— and Segundo Celis.

In 1987, former Sporting Cristal players Carlos Ríos Mora and Julio Aliaga joined the club. That same year, after competing in the North Regional Tournament, Deportivo Cañaña was required to participate in the Intermedia tournament.

Its performances in the Northern Regional tournaments were competitive and noteworthy; however, the club was never able to win the regional title, which prevented it from qualifying for the Torneo Descentralizado.

In 1991, the club finished ninth in the overall standings, which forced it to compete in the 1992 Torneo Zonal in search of promotion. However, the team failed to achieve that objective and ultimately returned to the Copa Perú.

At the beginning of 1993, the club merged with Juan Aurich, giving rise to Aurich-Cañaña. Under the management of Argentine coach Horacio Baldessari, the new team began its participation in the Regional Stage of the 1993 Copa Perú and went on to win the tournament title. Thanks to that achievement, the club made its debut in professional football in 1994, remaining in the top division until 1996, when it was relegated.

In 1997, Deportivo Cañaña decided to restart its football activities from its original local league. In 2002, the club reached the Departmental Stage of the Copa Perú, but was eliminated after finishing behind champions Deportivo Pomalca and Jacinto Muro of Pítipo. The following year, the club once again fell short after losing the provincial final to Sport Victoria of Túcume.

In 2007, due to the financial crisis affecting the institution, the club chose not to participate in the Liga Distrital de Lambayeque.

== Honours ==
=== Senior titles ===
Keys

- Record
- ^{(s)} Shared record

Type	Competition	Titles	Runner-up	Winning years	Runner-up years
National (League)	Copa Perú	1	1	1986	1983
Half-year / Short; Tournament (League)	Torneo Descentralizado "B"	—	1	—	1988
Regional (League)	Liga Departamental de Lambayeque	2	—	1982, 1985	—
Regional (League)	Liga Provincial de Lambayeque	5	1	1982, 1985, 2000, 2001, 2002	2003

== See also ==
- List of football clubs in Peru
- Peruvian football league system
