= Mina San Vicente =

- Full name: Unión Sport Mina San Vicente
- Founded: June 1, 1970
- Ground: Municipal de San Román, San Román
- Chairman: Jesus Arias Davila
- League: Copa Perú
Home colours	Away colours

Mina San Vicente is a Peruvian football club, playing in the city of Junín, Peru.

The club was founded 1970 and plays in the Copa Perú, which is the third division of the Peruvian league.

== History ==
The club was founded on June 1, 1970, with the support of the mining business "San Vicente" that operates in the province of Chanchamayo.

The club has played at the highest level of Peruvian football on five occasions, from 1987 Torneo Descentralizado until 1991 Torneo Descentralizado, when it was relegated to the Copa Perú.

== See also ==
- List of football clubs in Peru
- Peruvian football league system
