= Colegio Nacional Iquitos =

Association football club in Peru

- Full name: Institución Deportiva Colegio Nacional de Iquitos S. A.
- Nicknames: CNI, Los Charapas, Los Albos, El Rey de la Selva
- Founded: 1926; 100 years ago
- Ground: Estadio Max Augustín; Iquitos
- Capacity: 24,000
- Chairman: Rafael Rengifo Vásquez
- Manager: Marcial Salazar
- League: Copa Perú
- 2013: Eliminated in District Stage
- Website: http://www.cni.pe/
Home colours	Away colours

Colegio Nacional Iquitos (usually referred to as CNI) is a Peruvian football team based in the city of Iquitos which was founded in 1926. CNI is the biggest club in the city of Iquitos and currently is not playing in any league. At the beginning of 2012 CNI withdrew from Peruvian Segunda División and chose to play in the 2012 Copa Perú, after being relegated from Primera División in 2011.

== History ==
On May 20, 1926 there was a meeting of 47 alumni of the Colegio Nacional Iquitos, their principal, Pedro A. del Águila Hidalgo and Isabel Aguilar, with the purpose of establishing the Asociación Deportiva Colegio Nacional Iquitos.

This club represented Iquitos in Primera División Peruana for 20 years, from 1973 to 1992. Their best performance came in 1977, when the team won a match in Cusco against Cienciano with a Henry Perales goal. At that conclusion of the first stage of the national championship, they tied for first with FBC Melgar. In the subsequent stage national title contest, and Copa Libertadores qualifiers, the team could not maintain their first-place position and lost.

Notable players for CNI were: national team starters Ottorino Sartor, Juan "Papelito" Cáceres and Ramón Quiroga; and notable defenders such as César Adriazola, Juan Manuel Toyco, Roberto Arrelucea, Ernesto Guillén, Florentino Bernaola and Israel Quijandría; in addition to forwards Juan José Oré, Bernabé Navarro, Ernesto Neyra, Juan Michael of the Eagle, Nehemías Mera, and Richard Vinatea.

In 1992, CNI had a surprising beginning under manager Henry Perales ranking second in the first half of the Decentralizado 1992. During the second half of tournament play, institutional problems arose and the team did not maintain score as was made in the first half of the tournament. CNI lost to León de Huánuco, 5-0; then was relegated.

On December 11, 2008, CNI returned to the top flight through the Copa Perú. CNI was runner-up in the final stage of the 2008 Copa Perú in a decisive group stage match against Atlético Torino which ended in a 1–1 draw. CNI defeated eventual champions Sport Huancayo 1–0 in the final round opener and also tied 2–2 with Cobresol F.B.C. of Moquegua.

After spending two years in Peru's highest tier, the club relegated in 2011 after finishing last of the season. It decided not to participate in the Peruvian Segunda División but moved to the regional stage of the 2012 Copa Perú where it ended a short two-game campaign after finishing second in their group with 3 points.

== Historic badges ==
1926–2009

== CNI F.C. ==
CNI F.C. is CNI's reserve team which plays in the Iquitos District League. After CNI's bad campaign in the 2012 Copa Perú, it was forced to start from its league of origin. As the original club carried previous debt the club owners decided to start over by reinforcing the reserve team for the upcoming season. CNI F.C. made it to the Copa Perú 2013 where it was eliminated by Unión Huaral in the Round of 16.

=== Honours ===
Regional

- Región III: 0

Runner-up (1): 2013

- Liga Departamental de Loreto: 0

Runner-up (1): 2013

== Notable players ==
- (Ghana) Félix Marquaye
- (Panama) Óscar McFarlane
- (Peru) Ramón Quiroga
- (Peru) Ottorino Sartor

== Honours ==
=== Senior titles ===
Keys

- Record
- ^{(s)} Shared record

Type	Competition	Titles	Runner-up	Winning years	Runner-up years
National (League)	Copa Perú	—	1	—	2008
Half-year / Short; Tournament (League)	Torneo Descentralizado	—	1	—	1984
Half-year / Short; Tournament (League)	Torneo Regional	—	1	—	1985
Half-year / Short; Tournament (League)	Torneo Interzonal	—	1	—	1977 Grupo A
Half-year / Short; Tournament (League)	Torneo Zona Oriente	2	1	1989–II, 1991–I	1990–II
Regional (League)	Región Oriente	6	—	1967, 1968, 1969, 1970, 1971, 1973	—
Regional (League)	Región VI	1	—	1993	—
Regional (League)	Región III	6	—	1996, 1997, 1998, 2002, 2006, 2007	—
Regional (League)	Liga Departamental de Loreto	14	1	1966, 1967, 1968, 1969, 1970, 1972, 1996, 1997, 1998, 2001, 2002, 2005, 2006, 2008	2007
Regional (League)	Liga Provincial de Maynas	4	1	2002, 2006, 2007, 2008	2003
Regional (League)	Liga Distrital de Iquitos	8	2	1966, 1967, 1968, 1969, 1970, 1972, 2005, 2008	1954, 1965
