= Estadio Mansiche =

Multi-purpose stadium in Trujillo, Peru

Coordinates: 8.106655°S 79.030977°W

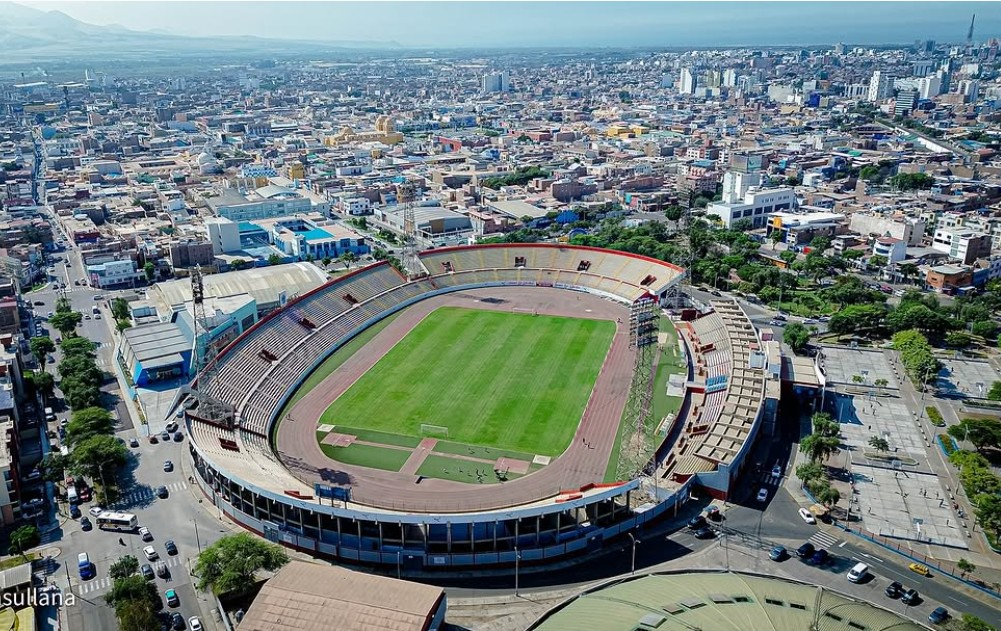
- Interactive map of Estadio Mansiche
- Full name: Estadio Mansiche
- Location: Trujillo, Peru
- Owner: Instituto Peruano del Deporte
- Capacity: 25,036
- Surface: Natural Grass
- Field size: 111 x 73

Construction
- Built: 1944-46
- Opened: 12 October 1946
- Renovated: 1993, 2004, 2005
- Expanded: 1984, 2004

Tenants
- Carlos A. Mannucci (1959–present); C.D. Universidad César Vallejo (1996–present)

Estadio Mansiche is the largest stadium of the city of Trujillo and the home of the most important football clubs in the city, Carlos A. Mannucci and Universidad César Vallejo. The stadium also has a running track for track and field sports. The stadium is part of the greater Mansiche Sports Complex which includes the Coliseo Gran Chimu, a swimming pool, and other facilities. It has a capacity of a little over 25,000.

It has hosted matched of the Copa Sudamericana in three occasions, and of the Copa Libertadores once. It hosted Group B matches during the 1995 South American Under-17 Football Championship. It has also hosted matches at the 2004 Copa America and 2005 FIFA U-17 World Championship. Most recently, it hosted the ceremonies of the 2013 Bolivarian Games.

== History ==
Local athlete Estuardo Meléndez Macchiavello was the first to ask for the construction of a stadium in Trujillo to President Manuel Prado y Ugarteche. The construction of the stadium took two years between 13 May 1944 and July 1946 which was at first known as Estadio Modelo de Trujillo. It was inaugurated under the presidency of José Luis Bustamante y Rivero.

The inauguration ceremony happened on 12 October 1946 in presence of then Vice-president José Gálvez Barrenechea, Zoila María de la Victoria, and the mother of political leader Victor Raul Haya de la Torre, Rosa Francisca de Paula de la Torre. The first football match played at the stadium was between Deportivo Trujillo and Sport Tigre.

The original capacity of 5,000 was increased in 1984 to 14,000 when the north stand was built. This was so that Sporting Cristal could use the stadium during the 1984 Copa Libertadores. In 1993 artificial lighting was added to the stadium which allowed for matches to be played after dark. The stadium hosted all of the Group B matches during the 1995 South American Under-17 Football Championship.

Three of the four stands, north, south, and west, where rebuilt for the 2004 Copa America. Luxury sitting, broadcasting boxes, renovated changing rooms, and an electronic scoreboard were also installed. This brought the stadium capacity to approximately 20,000. The next year, the natural grass pitch was replaced for turf for the 2005 FIFA U-17 World Championship. The pitch would not return to natural grass until 2013.

== 2004 Copa América ==
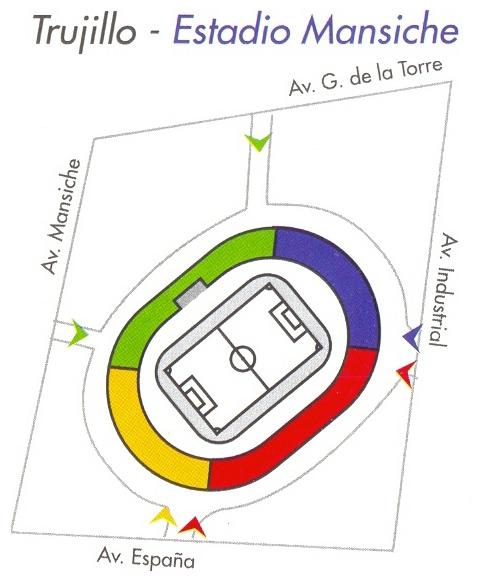
Location of Estadio Mansiche

Date	Time (UTC−5)	Team #1	Result	Team #2	Round
12 July 2004	17.30	Venezuela	1 – 1	Bolivia	Group A
12 July 2004	19.45	Peru	2 – 2	Colombia	Group A
17 July 2004	19.45	Colombia	2 – 0	Costa Rica	Quarterfinals

== See also ==
- Coliseo Gran Chimu
- Mansiche Sports Complex
