= 2011 Ligas Departamentales del Peru =

Ligas Departamentales del Peru
- Season: 2011

The 2011 Ligas Departamentales, the fifth division of Peruvian football (soccer), was played by variable number teams by Departament.

== Liga Departamental de Amazonas ==
=== Zona Norte ===
==== Group A ====
Pos	Team	Pld	W	D	L	GF	GA	GD	Pts
1	Grupo Malca	4	3	1	0	10	1	+9	10
2	San Francisco de Asís	4	2	1	1	24	4	+20	7
3	Unión Awajún	4	0	0	4	3	32	−29	0

==== Group B ====
Pos	Team	Pld	W	D	L	GF	GA	GD	Pts
1	Vencedores del Cenepa	3	3	0	0	5	2	+3	9
2	Sport Nieva	3	1	1	1	10	7	+3	4
3	Tolasha	4	0	1	3	6	12	−6	1

==== Final ====
Teams			Scores		
1st leg home team	Points	2nd leg home team	1st leg	2nd leg	Pen.
Grupo Malca	1:4	Vencedores del Cenepa	0–0	2–3	–

=== Zona Sur ===
==== First Stage ====
Teams			Scores		
1st leg home team	Points	2nd leg home team	1st leg	2nd leg	Pen.
Unión Santo Domingo	1:4	Mariscal Benavides	1–1	1–2	–
San Antonio de Chontapampa	4:1	Juventud Tushpuna	2–1	1–1	–
Unión Comercial	3:3	San Juan de Luya	0–3	4–1	–
Defensor Coechán	3:3	Defensor Florida	2–0	3–4	–

==== Second Stage ====
Teams			Scores		
1st leg home team	Points	2nd leg home team	1st leg	2nd leg	Pen.
Mariscal Benavides	0:6	San Antonio de Chontapampa	5–7	0–2	–
Unión Comercial	6:0	Defensor Coechán	2–0	2–1	–

==== Final ====
Teams			Scores		
1st leg home team	Points	2nd leg home team	1st leg	2nd leg	Pen.
Unión Comercial	0:6	San Antonio de Chontapampa	3–4	0–1	–

=== Semifinals ===
Teams			Scores		
1st leg home team	Points	2nd leg home team	1st leg	2nd leg	Pen.
Vencedores del Cenepa	3:3	Unión Comercial	4–2	3–5	–
San Antonio de Chontapampa	4:1	Grupo Malca	1–0	1–1	–

== Liga Departamental de Ancash ==
=== First stage ===
Teams			Scores		
1st leg home team	Points	2nd leg home team	1st leg	2nd leg	Pen.
Huaraz FC	1:4	Los Caballeros de La Ley	1–2	1–1	–
DELUSA	3:3	Tayca Chilcal	2–1	0–1	–
El Chasqui	3:3	Los Alacranes de Kótup	7–2	0–1	–
El Obrero de Recuay	3:3	Juventud San Marcos	2–4	1–4	–
Defensor Tumán	3:3	Santa Gertrudis	2–4	3–2	–
Unión Oncoy	1:4	Cultural Rázuri	0–7	2–2	–
Los Amigos de Mariscal Luzuriaga	1:4	José Olaya (Carlos F. Fitzcarrald)	2–2	3–6	–
Unión Santa Fe	3:3	Social Marcará	2–3	4–1	–
Las Palmeras	3:3	San Cristóbal de Yungay	0–1	1–0	5–3
San Miguel de Mariscal Luzuriaga	6:0	Lucerito de Sihuas	1–0	3–1	–
Hijos de Comunpampa	0:6	Los Amigos de Sihuas	0–2	0–2	–
Los Huauyas	6:0	Artesanos Don Bosco	2–0	3–2	–
Defensor Porteño	6:0	Sport Huayumaca	1–0	2–1	–
Defensor River Santa	6:0	Juventud América	4–0	3–0	–
América de Samanco	6:0	Defensor Cochas	3–0	1–0	–
Cultural Santo Domingo	4:1	Independiente 3 de Octubre	1–1	3–1	–

=== Second stage ===
Teams			Scores		
1st leg home team	Points	2nd leg home team	1st leg	2nd leg	Pen.
Defensor River Santa	1:4	Los Caballeros de La Ley	2–3	2–2	–
Cultural Rázuri	6:0	El Chasqui	5–1	4–2	–
Juventud San Marcos	3:3	Santa Gertrudis	3–0	1–2	–
San Miguel de Mariscal Luzuriaga	0:6	Los Huauyas	0–2	0–1	–
Los Amigos de Sihuas	2:2	José Olaya (Carlos F. Fitzcarrald)	2–2	1–1	–
Unión Santa Fe	2:2	Las Palmeras de Huaylas	1–1	1–1	2–1
Cultural Santo Domingo	3:3	DELUSA	0–3	3–0	3–2
América de Samanco	4:1	Defensor Porteño	0–0	3–1	–

=== Third stage ===
Teams			Scores		
1st leg home team	Points	2nd leg home team	1st leg	2nd leg	Pen.
Los Huauyas	1:4	Los Amigos de Sihuas	0–0	1–3	–
Cultural Rázuri	4:1	Juventud San Marcos	3–3	3–1	–
Los Caballeros de La Ley	3:3	Unión Santa Fe	5–3	0–1	–
América de Samanco	3:3	Cultural Santo Domingo	1–0	0–1	3–4

=== Fourth stage ===
Teams			Scores		
1st leg home team	Points	2nd leg home team	1st leg	2nd leg	Pen.
Cultural Rázuri	4:1	Los Caballeros de La Ley	1–1	2–1	–
Cultural Santo Domingo	6:0	Los Amigos de Sihuas	2–0	3–0	–

=== Semifinals ===
Teams			Scores		
1st leg home team	Points	2nd leg home team	1st leg	2nd leg	Pen.
Universidad San Pedro	3:0	Cultural Rázuri	6–2	1–3	–
Cultural Santo Domingo	3:3	UNASAM	2–7	1–0	–

=== Final ===
Teams			Scores		
1st leg home team	Points	2nd leg home team	1st leg	2nd leg	Pen.
Universidad San Pedro	3:0	UNASAM	3–1	–	–

== Liga Departamental de Apurímac ==
=== First stage ===
Teams			Scores		
1st leg home team	Points	2nd leg home team	1st leg	2nd leg	Pen.
Miguel Grau	6:0	Juventud Mollebamba	4–1	6–1	–
José María Arguedas	6:0	Gerencia Sub Regional	9–0	3–0	–
Deportivo Municipal (Antabamba)	1:4	Deportivo Educación	1–1	1–4	–
Deportivo Municipal (Challhuani)	4:1	Real América	1–1	1–0	–
Deportivo Municipal (Chuquibambilla)	6:0	Social Challhuahuacho	3–1	1–0	–
Unión Iscahuaca	3:3	Real Santa María	2–1	0–1	8–9
Mina Las Bambas	4:1	Micaela Bastidas Ayrihuanca	1–1	2–0	–
Cultural Santa Rosa	6:0	Unión Soraya	4–0	2–0	–

=== First stage - Finals ===
Team 1	Score	Team 2
José María Arguedas	3–1	Miguel Grau
Deportivo Educación	0–1	Deportivo Municipal (Challhuani)
Deportivo Municipal (Chuquibambilla)	0–1	Real Santa María
Mina Las Bambas	1–4	Cultural Santa Rosa

=== Quarterfinals ===
Teams			Scores		
1st leg home team	Points	2nd leg home team	1st leg	2nd leg	Pen.
Real Santa María	:	Mina Las Bambas	–	–	–
José María Arguedas	:	Deportivo Educación	–	–	–
Deportivo Municipal (Challhuani)	:	Miguel Grau	–	–	–
Deportivo Municipal (Chuquibambilla)	:	Cultural Santa Rosa	–	–	–

=== Semifinals ===
Teams			Scores		
1st leg home team	Points	2nd leg home team	1st leg	2nd leg	Pen.
	:	José María Arguedas	–	–	–
	:	Cultural Santa Rosa	–	–	–

=== Final ===
Teams			Scores		
1st leg home team	Points	2nd leg home team	1st leg	2nd leg	Pen.
José María Arguedas	0:3	Cultural Santa Rosa	0–3	–	–

== Liga Departamental de Arequipa ==
=== First stage ===
Teams			Scores			
1st leg home team	Points	2nd leg home team	1st leg	2nd leg	Extra match	Pen.
Unión Minas de Orcopampa	6:0	La Pulpera	2–0	1–0	–	–
Atlético Pedregal	1:4	Social Corire	0–0	1–2	–	–
Sport Rosario	6:3	La Quebrada Brava	2–0	1–2	3–1	–
Defensor Santa Ana	0:6	Atlanta Carmen Alto	1–5	1–5	–	–
Deportivo Estrella	6:0	Centro Bella Unión	4–1	1–0	–	–
Cultural La Aguadita	3:6	Deportivo Esperanza	4–1	0–2	0–1	–
Sport Boys	0:6	Saetas de Oro	0–2	1–6	–	–
White Star	3:6	Inclán Sport	2–1	0–3	1–2	–

=== Second stage ===
Teams			Scores		
1st leg home team	Points	2nd leg home team	1st leg	2nd leg	Pen.
Atlanta Carmen Alto	0:6	Unión Minas de Orcopampa	1–3	0–10	–
Social Corire	6:0	Sport Rosario	4–0	6–0	–
Saetas de Oro	4:1	Deportivo Esperanza	2–1	2–2	–
Deportivo Estrella	6:0	Inclán Sport	5–0	2–1	–

=== Cuadrangular Final ===
Pos	Team	Pld	W	D	L	GF	GA	GD	Pts
1	Saetas de Oro	5	4	0	1	10	6	+4	12
2	Unión Minas de Orcopampa	5	3	1	1	11	4	+7	10
3	Social Corire	5	2	0	3	4	8	−4	6
4	Deportivo Estrella	5	0	1	4	2	9	−7	1

== Liga Departamental de Ayacucho ==
=== First stage ===
Teams			Scores		
1st leg home team	Points	2nd leg home team	1st leg	2nd leg	Pen.
Sport Alameda	:	Deportivo Municipal (Huancapi)	2–0	–	–
Leones de Chaupi	:	Estudiantes Pomacocha	0–1	–	–
Deportivo Municipal (Querobamba)	:	Deportivo Municipal (San Miguel)	0–2	–	–
Nueva Generación (Churcampa)	:	Juventud Pampamarca	1–2	–	–
San Pablo de Hualla	:	Nuevo Amanecer de Lucanamarca	1–0	–	–
Nueva Generacion (Vischongo)	:	Sport Huracán	0–4	–	–
Sport VRAE Deportes	:	Unión Churcampa	7–0	–	–
Deportivo Municipal (Chilcas)	:	Deportivo Municipal Los Morochucos	2–2	–	–
Deportivo Municipal (Pichari)	:	Sport Cóndor	1–0	–	–
Cultural Huracán	:	Real Coraspampa	4–1	–	–

== Liga Departamental de Huánuco ==
=== First stage ===
Teams			Scores		
1st leg home team	Points	2nd leg home team	1st leg	2nd leg	Pen.
Defensor Ambo	0:6	Alianza Universidad	1–3	1–4	–

=== Quarterfinals ===
Teams			Scores		
1st leg home team	Points	2nd leg home team	1st leg	2nd leg	Pen.
UNHEVAL	3:0	San Sebastián de Huacaybamba	3–1	–	–
Sport Nacional de Ripán	0:6	Alianza Universidad	1–5	0–6	–
Guamán Poma	2:2	Negocios Unidos	0–0	0–0	–
Defensor Tocache	6:0	Defensor Manchuria	1–0	2–1	–

=== Semifinals ===
Teams			Scores		
1st leg home team	Points	2nd leg home team	1st leg	2nd leg	Pen.
UNHEVAL	1:4	Negocios Unidos	0–0	0–1	–
Defensor Tocache	0:6	Alianza Universidad	1–4	1–5	–

=== Final ===
Teams			Scores		
1st leg home team	Points	2nd leg home team	1st leg	2nd leg	Pen.
Negocios Unidos	1:4	Alianza Universidad	0–0	0–3	–

== Liga Departamental de Ica ==
=== Quarterfinals ===
Teams			Scores		
1st leg home team	Points	2nd leg home team	1st leg	2nd leg	Pen.
Unión La Calera	4:1	América de Palpa	0–0	2–0	–
Alianza Pisco	4:1	Sport Huracán	1–1	2–1	–
José María Arguedas	1:4	Defensor Zarumilla	0–0	1–4	–
Defensor Mayta Cápac	2:2	José Olaya (Pisco)	1–1	2–2	–

=== Semifinals ===
Teams			Scores		
1st leg home team	Points	2nd leg home team	1st leg	2nd leg	Pen.
Alianza Pisco	6:0	Unión La Calera	1–0	1–0	–
Defensor Mayta Cápac	0:6	Defensor Zarumilla	0–1	0–2	–

=== Final ===
Teams			Scores		
1st leg home team	Points	2nd leg home team	1st leg	2nd leg	Pen.
Defensor Zarumilla	3:0	Alianza Pisco	1–0	–	–

== Liga Departamental de La Libertad ==
=== Quarterfinals ===
Teams			Scores		
1st leg home team	Points	2nd leg home team	1st leg	2nd leg	Pen.
Estrella Roja	0:3	Universitario de Trujillo	–	0–3	–
Universitario Guadalupito	0:3	Carlos A. Mannucci	–	0–7	–
Defensor Virú	0:3	Transportes San Ildefonso	–	0–7	–
Inter FC	3:0	Sporting Tabaco (Ascope)	–	W.O.	–

=== Semifinals ===
Teams			Scores		
1st leg home team	Points	2nd leg home team	1st leg	2nd leg	Pen.
Universitario de Trujillo	3:0	Deportivo Marsa	3–0	–	–
Miguel Grau (Huamachuco)	3:0	Carlos A. Mannucci	1–0	–	–

== Liga Departamental de Lambayeque ==
=== First stage ===
Teams			Scores		
1st leg home team	Points	2nd leg home team	1st leg	2nd leg	Pen.
Deportivo Pomalca	4:1	Deportivo Úcupe	1–1	2–1	–
Universitarios de Illimo	6:0	Cruz de Chalpón	1–0	3–0	–
Los Caimanes	6:0	Juan Aurich (Ferreñafe)	3–1	5–0	–
Universidad Señor de Sipán	6:0	Simón Bolívar (Ferreñafe)	2–1	5–0	–
Olmos	4:1	Flamengo	1–1	2–1	–

=== Second stage ===
Teams			Scores		
1st leg home team	Points	2nd leg home team	1st leg	2nd leg	Pen.
Flamengo	0:6	Los Caimanes	1–2	0–1	–
Universitarios de Illimo	2:2	Deportivo Pomalca	0–0	1–1	–
Olmos	1:4	Universidad Señor de Sipán	0–1	0–0	–

=== Semifinals ===
Teams			Scores			
1st leg home team	Points	2nd leg home team	1st leg	2nd leg	3rd leg	Pen.
Universitarios de Illimo	0:6	Los Caimanes	0–5	0–7	–	–
Pomalca	5:2	Universidad Señor de Sipán	2–2	0–0	2–0	–

=== Final ===
Teams			Scores		
1st leg home team	Points	2nd leg home team	1st leg	2nd leg	Pen.
Los Caimanes	3:0	Deportivo Pomalca	2–1	–	–

== Liga Departamental de Lima ==
=== Round of 18 ===
Teams			Scores		
1st leg home team	Points	2nd leg home team	1st leg	2nd leg	Pen.
DIM	3:3	Unión Huaral	0–1	1–0	2–4
Santos Quispe	1:4	Pedro Anselmo Bazalar	1–1	0–1	
Sport Estrella	2:2	Sport Municipalidad	1–1	1–1	5–4
Estudiantes Condestable	6:0	Tres Unidos	7–1	3–2	
AIPSA	1:4	Pacífico	0–0	1–2	
River Plate de Canchacalla	3:3	Alianza Las Salinas	2–1	1–2	0–3
Los Caimanes de Oyón	3:3	Venus	1–8	2–1	
San Cristóbal de Chocos	1:1	San Lorenzo de Porococha	1–1	0–0	
Huracán de Canta	4:1	Juventud Santa Ana	1–0	1–1	

=== Round of 16 ===
Teams			Scores		
1st leg home team	Points	2nd leg home team	1st leg	2nd leg	Pen.
Juventud Santa Ana	1:4	Unión Huaral	1–1	2–3	–
AIPSA	0:6	Pedro Anselmo Bazalar	1–2	0–2	–
San Cristóbal de Chocos	3:3	Sport Estrella	1–0	2–3	–
Sport Municipalidad	3:3	Estudiantes Condestable	2–1	1–5	–
Los Caimanes de Oyón	3:3	Pacífico	1–2	0–3	–
DIM	4:1	Alianza Las Salinas	2–1	1–1	–
River Plate de Canchacalla	6:0	Venus	1–0	1–0	–
Huracán de Canta	2:2	San Lorenzo de Porococha	1–1	0–0	–

=== Quarterfinals ===
Teams			Scores		
1st leg home team	Points	2nd leg home team	1st leg	2nd leg	Pen.
Pedro Anselmo Bazalar	3:3	Unión Huaral	1–0	0–1	2–0
Estudiantes Condestable	6:0	San Cristóbal de Chocos	2–1	3–0	–
DIM	1:4	Pacífico	1–1	1–3	–
San Lorenzo de Porococha	2:2	River Plate de Canchacalla	2–2	2–2	5–4

=== Semifinals ===
Teams			Scores		
1st leg home team	Points	2nd leg home team	1st leg	2nd leg	Pen.
Estudiantes Condestable	3:3	Pedro Anselmo Bazalar	1–0	1–2	–
San Lorenzo de Porococha	1:4	Pacífico	0–0	0–1	–

=== Final ===
Teams			Scores		
1st leg home team	Points	2nd leg home team	1st leg	2nd leg	Pen.
Estudiantes Condestable	3:0	Pacífico	2–1	–	–

== Liga Departamental de Loreto ==
=== Final stage ===
Pos	Team	Pld	W	D	L	GF	GA	GD	Pts
1	Los Tigres	3	3	0	0	12	4	+8	9
2	Genaro Herrera	3	2	0	1	4	4	0	6
3	Balsapuerto	2	0	0	2	2	4	−2	0
4	Primero de Setiembre	2	0	0	2	1	7	−6	0

== Liga Departamental de Madre de Dios ==
=== First stage ===
Teams			Scores		
1st leg home team	Points	2nd leg home team	1st leg	2nd leg	Pen.
Deportivo Monterrico	0:6	MINSA	0–5	1–2	–
Deportivo Municipal (Tahuamanu)	1:4	Deportivo Maldonado	0–4	0–0	–
Deportivo Municipal (Manu)	0:3	MINSA	w/o	–	–
Transporte Pukiri	3:3	Deportivo Maldonado	1–0	0–2	3–4

=== Final ===
Teams			Scores		
1st leg home team	Points	2nd leg home team	1st leg	2nd leg	Pen.
MINSA	3:0	Deportivo Maldonado	1–0	–	–

== Liga Departamental Moquegua ==
=== Cuadrangular ===
Pos	Team	Pld	W	D	L	GF	GA	GD	Pts
1	Atlético Huracán	4	2	2	0	5	3	+2	8
2	Social EPISA	4	2	1	1	4	1	+3	7
3	San Simón	4	1	1	2	5	6	−1	4
4	Deportivo Enersur	4	0	2	2	5	9	−4	2

=== Repechaje Final ===
Teams			Scores		
1st leg home team	Points	2nd leg home team	1st leg	2nd leg	Pen.
Social EPISA	3:3	Juventud Unión Yanahuara	6–0	0–1	–

== Liga Departamental de Pasco ==
=== Group A ===
Teams			Scores		
1st leg home team	Points	2nd leg home team	1st leg	2nd leg	Pen.
Barrio Industrial de Villa Rica	3:3	Unión Minas	7–2	0–4	–
Sport Ticlacayán	6:0	Ñapurari de Puerto Bermúdez	3–0	2–1	–

=== Group B ===
Teams			Scores			
1st leg home team	Points	2nd leg home team	1st leg	2nd leg	Extra match	Pen.
UNDAC	4:1	FECHOP	2–1	0–0	–	–
Deportivo Municipal (Yanahuanca)	3:6	Juventud Ticlacayán	4–2	1–2	2–3	

=== Semifinals ===
Teams			Scores		
1st leg home team	Points	2nd leg home team	1st leg	2nd leg	Pen.
Sport Ticlacayán	6:0	Barrio Industrial de Villa Rica	3–0	4–1	–
Juventud Ticlacayán	2:2	UNDAC	0–0	1–1	–

=== Final ===
Teams			Scores		
1st leg home team	Points	2nd leg home team	1st leg	2nd leg	Pen.
Juventud Ticlacayán	3:0	Sport Ticlacayán	1–0	–	–

== Liga Departamental de Puno ==
=== Second stage ===
Teams			Scores		
1st leg home team	Points	2nd leg home team	1st leg	2nd leg	Pen.
Huracán San Francisco	0:6	Deportivo Universitario	0–1	0–1	–
Estudiantes Puno	6:0	ADESA	4–2	3–1	–
Empresa Comunal de Macarí	1:4	Alianza Moho	0–1	2–2	–
Hunter Boys	0:6	SELIP	1–2	1–6	–
Universidad Andina Junior	6:0	Alfonso Ugarte de Desaguadero	5–0	3–0	–

== Liga Departamental de San Martín ==
=== Zona Norte ===
==== Group A ====
Pos	Team	Pld	W	D	L	GF	GA	GD	Pts
1	Hugo Hausewell	5	4	1	0	9	1	+8	13
2	AD Nueva Rioja	5	3	2	0	10	4	+6	11
3	Deportivo Hospital (Moyobamba)	5	1	1	3	5	8	−3	4
4	Atlético Belén (Moyobamba)	5	0	0	5	0	11	−11	0

==== Group B ====
Pos	Team	Pld	W	D	L	GF	GA	GD	Pts
1	San Juan	3	3	0	0	8	1	+7	9
2	Alianza Cafetalera	4	2	0	2	5	5	0	6
3	Deportivo Ancohallo	3	0	0	3	1	8	−7	0

=== Zona Centro ===
==== Group A ====
Pos	Team	Pld	W	D	L	GF	GA	GD	Pts
1	Santa Rosa	4	3	1	0	10	2	+8	10
2	FC Picota	3	1	1	1	4	5	−1	4
3	Sporting Cristal Cahuana Sisa	3	0	0	3	3	10	−7	0

==== Group B ====
Pos	Team	Pld	W	D	L	GF	GA	GD	Pts
1	Sport San Juan	4	2	1	1	12	5	+7	7
2	Atlético Caspizapa	3	2	1	0	6	3	+3	7
3	Sargento Lores (El Dorado)	3	0	0	3	0	10	−10	0

=== Zona Sur ===
==== Group A ====
Pos	Team	Pld	W	D	L	GF	GA	GD	Pts
1	Nacional de Tingo de Sapo	4	3	1	0	7	2	+5	10
2	Sargento Lores (Huallaga)	3	0	2	1	4	5	−1	2
3	Integración Magisterial	3	0	1	2	4	8	−4	1

==== Group B ====
Pos	Team	Pld	W	D	L	GF	GA	GD	Pts
1	Huallaga	3	3	0	0	18	2	+16	9
2	Deportivo Víveres	3	1	1	1	6	7	−1	4
3	Defensor La Unión	4	0	1	3	3	18	−15	1

=== Second Stage ===
Teams			Scores		
1st leg home team	Points	2nd leg home team	1st leg	2nd leg	Pen.
Hugo Hausewell	1:4	San Juan	0–0	1–3	–
Atlético Caspizapa	0:6	Santa Rosa	0–5	0–3	–
Nacional de Tingo de Sapo	0:6	Huallaga	1–2	1–4	–

=== Triangular Final ===
Pos	Team	Pld	W	D	L	GF	GA	GD	Pts	
1	Huallaga	4	2	1	1	5	4	+1	7	Advance to 2011 Copa Perú
2	San Juan	4	1	2	1	4	4	0	5	Advance to 2011 Copa Perú
3	Santa Rosa	4	0	3	1	4	5	−1	3	

== Liga Departamental de Tacna ==
=== Group A ===
Pos	Team	Pld	W	D	L	GF	GA	GD	Pts
1	Mariscal Miller	4	3	1	0	16	3	+13	10
2	Unión Mirave	4	3	1	0	7	3	+4	10
3	Social Santa Cruz	4	2	0	2	7	4	+3	6
4	San Isidro de Ite	3	0	0	3	0	13	−13	0
5	Micro Región Tarata	3	0	0	3	0	7	−7	0

=== Group B ===
Pos	Team	Pld	W	D	L	GF	GA	GD	Pts
1	Mariscal Cáceres	4	4	0	0	11	5	+6	12
2	Sport Nevados	4	2	1	1	7	6	+1	7
3	Independiente (Tarata)	4	2	0	2	7	4	+3	6
4	Unión Alfonso Ugarte	4	1	1	2	4	5	−1	4
5	Juventud Locumba	4	0	0	4	1	10	−9	0

=== Semifinals ===
Teams			Scores		
1st leg home team	Points	2nd leg home team	1st leg	2nd leg	Pen.
Mariscal Miller	3:0	Mariscal Cáceres	4–2	–	–
Unión Mirave	0:3	Sport Nevados	0–1	–	–

=== Final ===
Teams			Scores		
1st leg home team	Points	2nd leg home team	1st leg	2nd leg	Pen.
Mariscal Miller	3:0	Sport Nevados	1–0	–	–

== Liga Departamental de Tumbes ==
=== Standings ===
Pos	Team	Pld	W	D	L	GF	GA	GD	Pts	
1	Sport Buenos Aires	8	5	2	1	19	8	+11	17	Advance to 2011 Copa Perú
2	José Chiroque Cielo	8	5	2	1	20	9	+11	17	Advance to 2011 Copa Perú
3	Sporting Pizarro	8	4	3	1	19	6	+13	15	
4	Teófilo Cubillas	8	4	2	2	14	10	+4	14	
5	UNT	7	2	2	3	6	6	0	8	
6	José Peña Herrera	7	2	1	4	14	19	−5	7	
7	Sport Miraflores	7	2	1	4	7	14	−7	7	
8	Alejandro Villanueva	7	2	1	4	8	17	−9	7	
9	DINE	8	0	2	6	7	25	−18	2	

== Liga Departamental de Ucayali ==
=== Quarterfinals ===
Teams			Scores		
1st leg home team	Points	2nd leg home team	1st leg	2nd leg	Pen.
Deportivo Municipal (Atalaya)	0:6	Señor de los Milagros	1–2	1–2	–
Miguel Grau (Atalaya)	3:3	UNU	2–1	1–2	3–4
Benjamín Cisneros	1:4	Defensor Neshuya	3–3	1–2	–
Defensor San Alejandro	4:3	Unión Miraflores (CP)	2–2	2–2	–

=== Cuadrangular Final ===
Pos	Team	Pld	W	D	L	GF	GA	GD	Pts	
1	Defensor San Alejandro	3	3	0	0	13	3	+10	9	Advance to 2011 Copa Perú
2	UNU	3	2	0	1	9	6	+3	6	Advance to 2011 Copa Perú
3	Defensor Neshuya	3	1	0	2	4	11	−7	3	
4	Señor de los Milagros	3	0	0	3	5	11	−6	0	
