= 2011 Copa Perú =

Copa Perú
- Season: 2011
- Champions: Real Garcilaso
- Biggest home win: Los Caimanes 5–0 San Antonio (C)
- Biggest away win: Los Tigres 1–4 Pacífico; Pomalca 0–3 Sport Buenos Aires
- Highest scoring: Minas (O) 2–4 Real Garcilaso Only Regional and National Stages taken into consideration

The 2011 Copa Perú season (Spanish: Copa Perú 2011), the promotion tournament of Peruvian football, started on February.

The tournament has 5 stages. The first four stages are played as mini-league round-robin tournaments, except for third stage in region IV, which is played as a knockout stage. The final stage features two knockout rounds and a final four-team group stage to determine the two promoted teams.

The 2011 Peru Cup started with the District Stage (Spanish: Etapa Distrital) on February. The next stage was the Provincial Stage (Spanish: Etapa Provincial) which started on June. The tournament continued with the Departamental Stage (Etapa Departamental) on July. The Regional Stage follow in September. The National Stage (Etapa Nacional) starts in November. The winner of the National Stage will be promoted to the First Division and the runner-up will be promoted to the Second Division.

== Departmental Stage ==
Departmental Stage: 2011 Ligas Departamentales del Peru and 2011 Ligas Superiores del Peru

The following list shows the teams that qualified for the Regional Stage.

Departament	Team	Location
Amazonas	San Antonio de Chontapampa	Rodríguez de Mendoza
Amazonas	Vencedores del Cenepa	Bagua
Ancash	Universidad San Pedro	Huaraz
Ancash	UNASAM	Huaraz
Apurímac	Cultural Santa Rosa	Andahuaylas
Apurímac	José María Arguedas	Andahuaylas
Arequipa	Saetas de Oro	Arequipa
Arequipa	Unión Minas de Orcopampa	Orcopampa
Arequipa	Aurora	Arequipa
Arequipa	Sportivo Huracán	Arequipa
Ayacucho	Sport Huracán	Huamanga
Ayacucho	Deportivo Municipal (San Miguel)	La Mar
Cajamarca	UTC	Cajamarca
Cajamarca	Cultural Volante	Bambamarca
Cajamarca	Comerciantes Unidos	Cutervo
Callao	Nuevo Amanecer	Callao
Callao	América Callao	Callao
Cusco	Virgen del Carmen	Anta
Cusco	Humberto Luna	Calca
Cusco	Real Garcilaso	Cusco
Huancavelica	Deportivo Municipal (Paucará)	Acobamba
Huancavelica	Unión Minas (Ccochaccasa)	Angaraes
Huánuco	Alianza Universidad	Huánuco
Huánuco	Negocios Unidos	Tingo María
Huánuco	Bella Durmiente	Tingo María
Ica	Defensor Zarumilla	Nazca
Ica	Alianza Pisco	Pisco
Ica	Joe Gutiérrez	Pisco
Ica	Sport Victoria	Ica
Junín	Deportivo Municipal (Mazamari)	Mazamari
Junín	Deportivo Municipal (Morococha)	Morococha
Junín	ADT	Tarma
La Libertad	Universitario de Trujillo	Trujillo
La Libertad	Carlos A. Mannucci	Trujillo

Department	Team	Location
Lambayeque	Los Caimanes	Puerto Etén
Lambayeque	Deportivo Pomalca	Chiclayo
Lima	Estudiantes Condestable	Mala
Lima	Pacífico	Lima
Lima	Juventud Barranco	Huacho
Lima	Géminis	Lima
Loreto	Los Tigres	Iquitos
Loreto	Genaro Herrera	Ucayali
Madre de Dios	MINSA	Tambopata
Madre de Dios	Deportivo Maldonado	Puerto Maldonado
Moquegua	Atlético Huracán	Moquegua
Moquegua	Social EPISA	Ilo
Pasco	Juventud Ticlacayán	Pasco
Pasco	Sport Ticlacayán	Pasco
Piura	José Olaya (Sechura)	Sechura
Piura	9 de Octubre	Talara
Piura	Atlético Grau	Piura
Puno	Franciscano San Román	Juliaca
Puno	Estudiantes Puno	Puno
San Martín	Huallaga	Huallaga
San Martín	San Juan	Moyobamba
Tacna	Mariscal Miller	Tacna
Tacna	Sport Nevados	Tacna
Tumbes	José Chiroque Cielo	Tumbes
Tumbes	Sport Buenos Aires	Tumbes
Tumbes	Defensor San José	Tumbes
Ucayali	Defensor San Alejandro	Aguaytía
Ucayali	UNU	Pucallpa
Ucayali	Deportivo Hospital	Pucallpa
Ucayali	Atlético Pucallpa	Pucallpa
Ucayali	Tecnológico	Pucallpa

== Regional Stage ==
Each region had two teams qualify for the next stage. The playoffs only determined the respective regional winners.

=== Region I ===
Region I includes qualified teams from Amazonas, Lambayeque, Tumbes and Piura region.

==== First stage ====
Team 1	Agg.	Team 2	1st leg	2nd leg
Atlético Grau	5–3	José Chiroque Cielo	4–0	1–3
Defensor San José	5–0	9 de Octubre	3–0	2–0
Deportivo Pomalca	1–3	Sport Buenos Aires	1–0	0–3
José Olaya (Sechura)	2–2	Vencedores del Cenepa	2–0	0–2
Los Caimanes	5–1	San Antonio de Chontapampa	5–0	0–1

===== Tiebreaker =====
Team 1	Score	Team 2
Atlético Grau	2–0	José Chiroque Cielo
Deportivo Pomalca	2–2 (4–3 p)	Sport Buenos Aires
José Olaya (Sechura)	5–1	Vencedores del Cenepa
Los Caimanes	2–2 (5–3 p)	San Antonio de Chontapampa

==== Second stage ====
Team 1	Agg.	Team 2	1st leg	2nd leg
Atlético Grau	3–1	Defensor San José	2–0	1–1
Deportivo Pomalca	1–3	José Olaya (Sechura)	0–0	1–3
Los Caimanes	3–2	Sport Buenos Aires	0–1	3–1

==== Semifinals ====
Team 1	Agg.	Team 2	1st leg	2nd leg
Atlético Grau	1–0	José Olaya (Sechura)	0–0	1–0
Los Caimanes	3–0	Sport Buenos Aires	2–0	1–0

==== Regional Final ====
Team 1	Score	Team 2
Los Caimanes	2–0	Atlético Grau

=== Region II ===
Region II includes qualified teams from Ancash, Cajamarca, La Libertad and San Martín region.

==== Group A ====
Pos	Team	Pld	W	D	L	GF	GA	GD	Pts	Qualification	USP	COM	CAM
1	Universidad San Pedro	4	2	1	1	5	7	−2	7	Región II - Semifinals		1–0	2–2
2	Comerciantes Unidos	4	2	0	2	7	5	+2	6		5–0		2–0
3	Carlos A. Mannucci	4	1	1	2	6	6	0	4		0–2	4–0	

Legend: Blue = home team win; Yellow = draw; Red = away team win.

==== Group B ====
Pos	Team	Pld	W	D	L	GF	GA	GD	Pts	Qualification	UNT	CVO	SJM
1	Universitario de Trujillo	4	3	0	1	9	1	+8	9	Región II - Semifinals		2–0	2–0
2	Cultural Volante	4	2	1	1	6	3	+3	7		2–1		3–0
3	San Juan	4	0	1	3	1	10	−9	1		0–4	1–1	

Legend: Blue = home team win; Yellow = draw; Red = away team win.

==== Group C ====
Pos	Team	Pld	W	D	L	GF	GA	GD	Pts	Qualification	HUA	UTC	UNS
1	Huallaga	4	3	0	1	11	1	+10	9	Región II - Semifinals		4–0	3–0
2	UTC	4	3	0	1	7	5	+2	9	Región II - Semifinals	1–0		3–0
3	UNASAM	4	0	0	4	1	13	−12	0		0–4	1–3	

Legend: Blue = home team win; Yellow = draw; Red = away team win.

==== Semifinals ====
Team 1	Agg.	Team 2	1st leg	2nd leg
Universitario de Trujillo	3–2	Huallaga	3–0	0–2
UTC	5–1	Universidad San Pedro	4–0	1–1

=== Region III ===
Region III includes qualified teams from Loreto and Ucayali region.

==== Group A ====
Pos	Team	Pld	W	D	L	GF	GA	GD	Pts	Qualification	LTI	PUC	TEC
1	Los Tigres	2	1	1	0	8	1	+7	4	National stage			8–1
2	Atlético Pucallpa	2	1	1	0	2	0	+2	4		0–0		
3	Tecnológico	2	0	0	2	1	10	−9	0			0–2	

Legend: Blue = home team win; Yellow = draw; Red = away team win.

===== Tiebreaker =====
Team 1	Score	Team 2
Los Tigres	1–0	Atlético Pucallpa

==== Group B ====
Pos	Team	Pld	W	D	L	GF	GA	GD	Pts	Qualification	UNU	HOS	DSA	GHE
1	UNU	3	2	1	0	11	4	+7	7	National stage			2–1	8–2
2	Deportivo Hospital	3	1	2	0	10	6	+4	5		1–1			5–1
3	Defensor San Alejandro	3	1	1	1	9	8	+1	4			4–4		
4	Genaro Herrera	3	0	0	3	5	17	−12	0				2–4	

Legend: Blue = home team win; Yellow = draw; Red = away team win.

==== Regional Final ====
Team 1	Score	Team 2
Los Tigres	0–1	UNU

=== Region IV ===
Region IV includes qualified teams from Lima and Callao region.

==== First stage ====
Team 1	Agg.	Team 2	1st leg	2nd leg
Juventud Barranco	5–1	Nuevo Amanecer	2–0	3–1
Géminis	3–2	América Callao	1–1	2–1
Pacífico	0–0 (3–5 p)	Estudiantes Condestable	0–0	0–0

==== Semifinals ====
Team 1	Agg.	Team 2	1st leg	2nd leg
Juventud Barranco	2–2 (1–3 p)	Géminis	1–1	1–1
Pacífico	2–1	Estudiantes Condestable	1–1	1–0

==== Regional Final ====
Team 1	Score	Team 2
Pacífico	1–0	Géminis

=== Region V ===
Region V includes qualified teams from Junín, Pasco and Huánuco region.

==== Group A ====
Pos	Team	Pld	W	D	L	GF	GA	GD	Pts	Qualification	ADT	MUM	NUN	JVT
1	ADT	6	4	1	1	10	2	+8	13	National stage		2–0	1–0	3–0
2	Deportivo Municipal (Morococha)	6	3	1	2	9	9	0	10		1–4		2–1	2–1
3	Negocios Unidos	6	2	1	3	4	6	−2	7		1–0	1–1		1–0
4	Juventud Ticlacayán	6	1	1	4	3	9	−6	4		0–0	1–3	2–0	

Legend: Blue = home team win; Yellow = draw; Red = away team win.

==== Group B ====
Pos	Team	Pld	W	D	L	GF	GA	GD	Pts	Qualification	ALI	MUM	SPT	BDU
1	Alianza Universidad	6	4	2	0	13	4	+9	14	National stage		1–1	4–1	4–0
2	Deportivo Municipal (Mazamari)	6	2	4	0	11	8	+3	10		2–2		3–1	1–1
3	Sport Ticlacayán	6	1	2	3	10	16	−6	5		0–1	1–1		5–5
4	Bella Durmiente	6	0	2	4	9	16	−7	2		0–1	2–3	1–2	

Legend: Blue = home team win; Yellow = draw; Red = away team win.

==== Regional Final ====
Team 1	Score	Team 2
ADT	0–2	Alianza Universidad

=== Region VI ===
Region VI includes qualified teams from Ayacucho, Huancavelica and Ica region. Two teams qualified from this stage.

==== Group A ====
Pos	Team	Pld	W	D	L	GF	GA	GD	Pts	Qualification	VIC	API	MUP	SPH
1	Sport Victoria	6	5	0	1	17	6	+11	15	National stage		3–1	2–1	7–1
2	Alianza Pisco	6	4	0	2	12	8	+4	12		2–1		1–0	4–2
3	Deportivo Municipal (Paucará)	6	3	0	3	12	6	+6	9		1–2	1–0		4–1
4	Sport Huracán	6	0	0	6	5	26	−21	0		0–2	1–4	0–5	

Legend: Blue = home team win; Yellow = draw; Red = away team win.

==== Group B ====
Pos	Team	Pld	W	D	L	GF	GA	GD	Pts	Qualification	DZA	CJG	MSM	UMC
1	Defensor Zarumilla	6	4	1	1	12	4	+8	13	National stage		3–1	2–0	3–0
2	Joe Gutiérrez	6	4	0	2	12	7	+5	12		2–0		2–1	4–0
3	Deportivo Municipal (San Miguel)	6	2	1	3	9	10	−1	7		1–1	2–1		4–1
4	Unión Minas (Ccochaccasa)	6	1	0	5	5	17	−12	3		0–3	1–2	3–1	

Legend: Blue = home team win; Yellow = draw; Red = away team win.

==== Regional Final ====
Team 1	Score	Team 2
Sport Victoria	1–2	Defensor Zarumilla

=== Region VII ===
Region VII includes qualified teams from Arequipa, Moquegua and Tacna region.

==== Group A ====
Pos	Team	Pld	W	D	L	GF	GA	GD	Pts	Qualification	HUR	UMO	SEP	SPN
1	Sportivo Huracán	6	5	0	1	23	4	+19	15	Región VII - Semifinals		3–0	5–0	9–0
2	Unión Minas de Orcopampa	6	4	0	2	8	6	+2	12	Región VII - Semifinals	2–1		3–0	2–0
3	Social EPISA	6	2	0	4	9	14	−5	6		1–3	2–0		4–0
4	Sport Nevados	6	1	0	5	4	20	−16	3		1–2	0–1	3–2	

Legend: Blue = home team win; Yellow = draw; Red = away team win.

==== Group B ====
Pos	Team	Pld	W	D	L	GF	GA	GD	Pts	Qualification	SOR	ARR	HUR	MMI
1	Saetas de Oro	6	3	3	0	10	4	+6	12	Región VII - Semifinals		0–0	3–2	3–0
2	Aurora	6	3	2	1	6	2	+4	11	Región VII - Semifinals	0–0		3–0	2–1
3	Atlético Huracán	6	3	1	2	9	8	+1	10		2–2	1–0		2–0
4	Mariscal Miller	6	0	0	6	1	12	−11	0		0–2	0–1	0–2	

Legend: Blue = home team win; Yellow = draw; Red = away team win.

==== Semifinals ====
Team 1	Agg.	Team 2	1st leg	2nd leg
Sportivo Huracán	2–2 (4–2 p)	Aurora	0–1	2–1
Saetas de Oro	1–3	Unión Minas de Orcopampa	0–1	1–2

==== Regional Final ====
Team 1	Score	Team 2
Sportivo Huracán	0–0 (4–2 p)	Unión Minas de Orcopampa

=== Region VIII ===
Region VIII includes qualified teams from Apurimac, Cusco, Madre de Dios and Puno region.

==== Group A ====
Pos	Team	Pld	W	D	L	GF	GA	GD	Pts	Qualification	GAR	MIN	VCA	MLD	HLC
1	Real Garcilaso	8	6	0	2	30	5	+25	18	National stage		4–0	5–1	14–0	2–0
2	MINSA	8	5	1	2	14	12	+2	16		2–0		1–0	0–3	4–0
3	Virgen del Carmen	8	4	1	3	14	9	+5	13		0–1	2–2		5–0	3–0
4	Deportivo Maldonado	8	2	1	5	7	29	−22	7		2–1	1–2	0–1		0–0
5	Humberto Luna	8	1	1	6	8	18	−10	4		0–3	2–3	0–2	6–1	

Legend: Blue = home team win; Yellow = draw; Red = away team win.

==== Group B ====
Pos	Team	Pld	W	D	L	GF	GA	GD	Pts	Qualification	FSR	JMA	EPU	CST
1	Franciscano San Román	6	3	1	2	6	5	+1	10	National stage		3–0	1–1	1–0
2	José María Arguedas	6	3	1	2	5	6	−1	10		2–0		1–1	1–0
3	Estudiantes Puno	6	2	3	1	8	6	+2	9		2–0	2–0		2–2
4	Cultural Santa Rosa	6	1	1	4	4	6	−2	4		0–1	0–1	2–0	

Legend: Blue = home team win; Yellow = draw; Red = away team win.

===== Tiebreaker =====
Team 1	Score	Team 2
Franciscano San Román	1–0	José María Arguedas

== National Stage ==
The National Stage starts on November. This stage has two knockout rounds and four-team group stage. The winner will be promoted to the 2012 Torneo Descentralizado and the runner-up of the National Stage will be promoted to the 2012 Peruvian Segunda División.

Round of 16
Los Caimanes	1	0	1
Universitario (T)	1	0	1
UTC	0	3	3
Atlético Grau	0	0	0
UNU	0	3	3
Géminis	0	1	1
Pacífico	0	4	4
Los Tigres	0	1	1
Alianza Universidad	3	2	5
Sport Victoria	0	1	1
Defensor Zarumilla	3	0	3
ADT	1	2	3
Sportivo Huracán	0	1	1
Franciscano San Román	0	0	0
Real Garcilaso	0	4	4
Unión Minas (O)	0	2	2

Quarterfinals
Los Caimanes	1	0	1 (3)
UTC	0	1	1 (2)
UNU	0	0	0
Pacífico	0	2	2
Alianza Universidad	0	1	1 (3)
ADT	1	0	1 (2)
Sportivo Huracán	0	2	2
Real Garcilaso	3	0	3

Semifinals
Los Caimanes	1	0	1
Pacífico	1	1	2
Alianza Universidad	3	0	3
Real Garcilaso	2	2	4

Champion & Runner-Up
Pacífico	1	1	2
Real Garcilaso	3	0	3

=== Round of 16 ===
Team 1	Agg.	Team 2	1st leg	2nd leg
Universitario de Trujillo	1–1 (a)	Los Caimanes	1–1	0–0
Atlético Grau	0–3	UTC	0–0	0–3
Géminis	1–3	UNU	0–0	1–3
Los Tigres	1–4	Pacífico	0–0	1–4
Alianza Universidad	5–1	Sport Victoria	3–0	2–1
Defensor Zarumilla	3–3 (a)	ADT	3–1	0–2
Franciscano San Román	0–1	Sportivo Huracán	0–0	0–1
Unión Minas de Orcopampa	2–4	Real Garcilaso	0–0	2–4

=== Quarterfinals ===
Team 1	Agg.	Team 2	1st leg	2nd leg
Los Caimanes	1–1 (3–2 p)	UTC	1–0	0–1
UNU	0–2	Pacífico	0–0	0–2
ADT	1–1 (2–3 p)	Alianza Universidad	1–0	0–1
Real Garcilaso	3–2	Sportivo Huracán	3–0	0–2

=== Semifinals ===
Team 1	Agg.	Team 2	1st leg	2nd leg
Pacífico	2–1	Los Caimanes	1–1	1–0
Alianza Universidad	3–4	Real Garcilaso	3–2	0–2

=== Final ===
Team 1	Agg.	Team 2	1st leg	2nd leg
Real Garcilaso	3–2	Pacífico	3–1	0–1

== See also ==
- 2011 Torneo Descentralizado
- 2011 Peruvian Segunda División
