= Club Cultural Deportivo Géminis =

Peruvian football club

Cultural Géminis
- Full name: Club Cultural Deportivo Géminis
- Founded: October 29, 1967
- Ground: Estadio Daniel Hernani, Comas
- Capacity: 6,000
- League: Copa Perú
- 2013: Eliminated in Departmental Stage
- Website: http://www.clubculturaldeportivogeminis.com/portal/index.php
Home colours	Away colours

Cultura Géminis is a Peruvian football club, playing in the city of Comas, Lima, Peru.

== History ==
The club was founded on the October 29, 1967 under the name of Club Cultural Deportivo Géminis in the city of Comas, Lima.

In 2010 Copa Perú, the club qualified to the National Stage when they defeated Atlético Pilsen Callao, La Peña Sporting and Deportivo Municipal in the Regional Stage; but was eliminated by Deportivo Hospital.

In 2011 Copa Perú, the club qualified to the National Stage, but was eliminated by Universidad Nacional de Ucayali in the round of 16.

== Honours ==
=== Regional ===
- Región IV:

Winners (1): 2010
Runner-up (1): 2011

- Liga Departamental de Lima:

Runner-up (1): 2010

- Liga Provincial de Lima:

Winners (1): 2018
Runner-up (1): 2010

- Liga Distrital de Comas:

Winners (4): 1986, 2014, 2017, 2019
Runner-up (4): 2009, 2010, 2025, 2018

== See also ==
- List of football clubs in Peru
- Peruvian football league system
