= Club Social Deportivo Cali =

Peruvian football club

Deportivo Cali de Tarapoto
- Full name: Club Social Deportivo Cali
- Nicknames: Canarios, Caleños
- Founded: October 12, 1953
- Ground: Carlos Vidaurre García, Tarapoto, Peru
- Capacity: 5,000
- Chairman: Julio Vergara Medrano
- Coach: Manuel Arévalo
- League: Copa Perú
- 2015: Etapa Distrital
Home colours	Away colours

The Deportivo Cali is a club of football of the Peru of the city of Tarapoto in the San Martín Region It was founded on October 12, 1953 and at present participates in the Copa Perú.

Although his main sportive activity is the football, also practise diverse sports like the basketball, volleyball, etc.

His traditional and historical rival is the Unión Tarapoto, with which stars the "Tarapotino Derby", for being another team of the city.

== History ==
=== Foundation ===
The Club Social Deportivo Cali was founded on October 12, 1953 in the house of the Mr. Santiago Bartra García of Jewish ancestry, where the before worked A Cevicheria, in the City of Tarapoto, Is One of the Most wanted Institution of the San Martín Region.

=== Peru Cup 2009 ===
His best Campaign That Did Was In the 2009 Copa Perú where arrived until the regional stage, where shared the Group B in the Region II with the University clubs of Trujillo, descendants Michiquillay, Youth Culebreña and the historical Universidad Técnica de Cajamarca.

=== Champion of the League Distrital 2013 ===
The league of Tarapoto Under the curtain of a tournament with his The last Date of the liguillas That top a Deportivo Cali Like champion of 2013. Taenia That Confront in the last Date of his classical rival, the Union Tarapoto . : Nevertheless, by means of it WAS the pride verdolaga of not Leaving That his rival More encarnizado Gave the Olympic Turn in His Face. But, in the Footpath of In front, Sabian That of any active attain the victory, the title Had gone to hands of the poets. of this Form, the caleños Went out with the aim m in looks it, achieving impose by 1-0 in struggled meeting. And The goal WAS Sufficient so that The Crown distrital dye of yellow and black.

== Uniform ==
- Uniform headline: yellow T-shirt, black trousers, yellow averages.
- Alternative uniform: black T-shirt, yellow trousers, yellow averages.

== Stadium ==
Municipal stadium Carlos Vidaurre García Is A stadium of multiple uses in Tarapoto. At present utilizació paragraph The Football matches of Peruvian Primera División and Copa Perú. The Stadium HAS A s capacity of 7.000 viewers.

== Rivalries ==
=== Tarapotino derby ===
The traditional rival of Deportivo Cali is the Unión Tarapoto. Meeting futbolístico of long history in the football Tarapotino . The origin of the rivalry Between Both gave Precisely From the Decade of the Sixty, Because of The continuous clashes and Disputes That began to star by the title. The rivalry Between Both WAS Growing with the step of the years, Until Being considered Like the "classical " tarapotino". Curiosity As, habria That mention That Sportive Cali there is not Dress As The identico Colombian team, But Well More do clothing is of yellow colours and black, Distinct thing to the one of his rival, Unión Tarapoto, That Precisely HAS a very similar clothing to of the true Sportive Cali of Colombia : Green T-shirt, White And short green averages.

== Bloated ==
=== The 12 Caleña ===
It is the best inflated of the San Martín Region . His breath is unconditional to the Canarian team.

== Honours ==
=== Regional ===
- Liga Departamental de San Martín:

Winners (2): 1974, 2013

- Liga Provincial de San Martín:

Winners (2): 2013, 2014
Runner-up (2): 2009, 2016

- Liga Distrital de Tarapoto:

Winners (1): 2013
Runner-up (4): 2009, 2014, 2016, 2019

== See also ==
- Tarapoto
- Copa Perú
- Unión Tarapoto
