= 1972 Copa Perú =

Copa Perú
- Season: 1972
- Champions: Atlético Grau
- Top goalscorer: Javier Fano (5)

The 1972 Copa Perú season (Spanish: Copa Perú 1972), the promotion tournament of Peruvian football.

In this tournament, after many qualification rounds, each one of the 24 departments in which Peru is politically divided qualified a team. Those teams, plus the team relegated from First Division on the last year, enter in two more rounds and finally 6 of them qualify for the Final round, staged in Lima (the capital).

Two teams were promoted to play in 1972 First Division.

== Finalists teams ==
The following list shows the teams that qualified for the Final Stage.

Department	Team	Location
Arequipa	Deportivo CARSA	Arequipa
Cusco	Cienciano	Cusco
Huánuco	León de Huánuco	Huaral
Junín	Deportivo Junín	Junín
Piura	Atlético Grau	Piura
San Martín	Cultural Juanjuí	Juanjuí

== Final Stage ==
=== Standings ===
Pos	Team	Pld	W	D	L	GF	GA	GD	Pts	Promotion
1	Atlético Grau (C)	5	5	0	0	14	5	+9	10	1972 Primera División
2	León de Huánuco	5	3	1	1	10	8	+2	7	1972 Primera División
3	Deportivo Junín	5	2	1	2	10	11	−1	5	
4	Cienciano	5	0	4	1	9	11	−2	4	
5	Cultural Juanjuí	5	1	1	3	9	12	−3	3	
6	Deportivo CARSA	5	0	1	4	7	12	−5	1	

(C) Champions

=== Results ===
==== Round 1 ====
29 February 1972	Cultural Juanjuí	2–1	Deportivo CARSA	Nacional, Lima

29 February 1972	Deportivo Junín	2–2	Cienciano	Nacional, Lima

29 February 1972	Atlético Grau	3–0	León de Huánuco	Nacional, Lima

==== Round 2 ====
3 March 1972	León de Huánuco	3–1	Cultural Juanjuí	Nacional, Lima

3 March 1972	Deportivo Junín	3–2	Deportivo CARSA	Nacional, Lima

3 March 1972	Atlético Grau	3–1	Cienciano	Nacional, Lima

==== Round 3 ====
6 March 1972	Atlético Grau	2–0	Deportivo Junín	Nacional, Lima

6 March 1972	León de Huánuco	2–0	Deportivo CARSA	Nacional, Lima

6 March 1972	Cienciano	3–3	Cultural Juanjuí	Nacional, Lima

==== Round 4 ====
10 March 1972	León de Huánuco	2–2	Cienciano	Nacional, Lima

10 March 1972	Deportivo Junín	3–2	Cultural Juanjuí	Nacional, Lima

10 March 1972	Atlético Grau	4–3	Deportivo CARSA	Nacional, Lima

==== Round 5 ====
13 March 1972	Cienciano	1–1	Deportivo CARSA	Nacional, Lima

13 March 1972	Atlético Grau	2–1	Cultural Juanjuí	Nacional, Lima

13 March 1972	León de Huánuco	3–2	Deportivo Junín	Nacional, Lima
