= Cultural Juanjuí =

- Full name: Club Deportivo Cultural Juanjuí
- Founded: February 2, 1942; 83 years ago
- Ground: Estadio Gran Pajatén, Juanjuí
- League: Copa Perú
Home colours

Club Deportivo Cultural Juanjuí (sometimes referred to as Cultural Juanjuí) is a Peruvian football club, playing in the city of Juanjuí, Mariscal Cáceres, San Martín, Peru.

== History ==
The Club Deportivo Cultural Juanjuí was founded on February 2, 1942 by Ricardo López, David Arévalo, Gaspar López, among others.

In the 1972 Copa Perú, the club qualified to the Final Stage, but was eliminated when it finished in 5th place.

Currently, the club participates in the Liga Distrital de Juanjuí.

== Honours ==
=== Regional ===
- Liga Departamental de San Martín:

Winners (5): 1968, 1969, 1970, 1971, 1988

- Liga Provincial de Mariscal Cáceres:

Winners (3): 1968, 1969, 1970

== See also ==
- List of football clubs in Peru
- Peruvian football league system
