= Ligas Departamentales del Perú =

- Founded: 1966
- Country: Peru
- Number of clubs: Variable
- Level on pyramid: 5
- Promotion to: Copa Perú (National stage)
- Relegation to: Ligas Provinciales
- Current: 2026 season

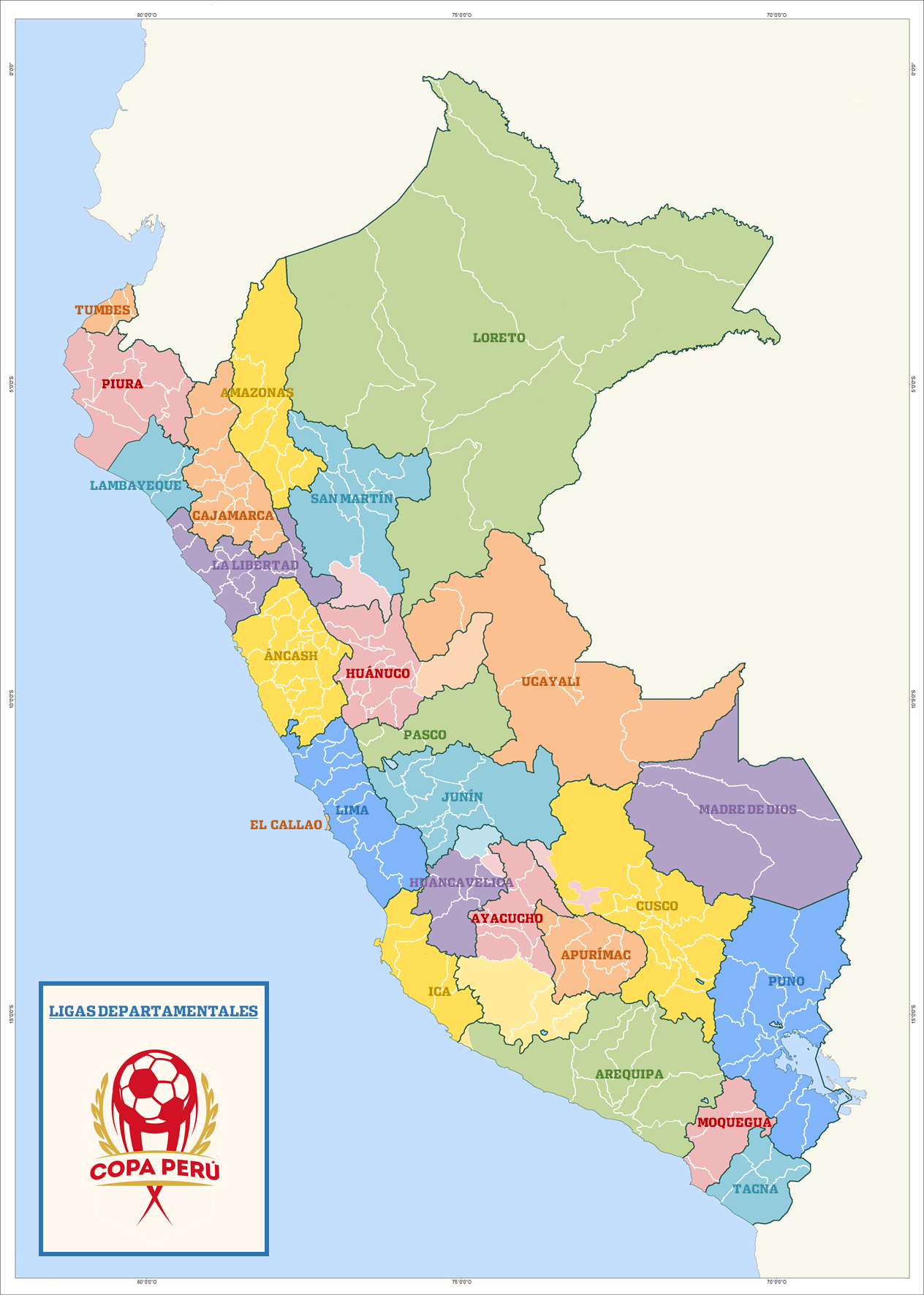
Map of all 25 departamental leagues.

The Ligas Departamentales is the fifth division of the Peruvian football league system, forming part of the Departamental Stage in the Copa Perú of the Peruvian Football Federation (FPF). There are 25 Departamental leagues each based on the Regions of Peru.

After the completion of the District and Provincial Stages, the provincial champions and runners-up from each province qualify for the Departmental Stage, which is organized by the corresponding Departmental League. The champion and runner-up of each Departmental Stage advance to the National Stage, bringing together a total of 50 finalist teams. The national champion is promoted to the Ligas 2, while the runner-up is promoted to the Ligas 2 or Ligas 3.

== History ==
The Departmental Stage, or Departmental Leagues, constitutes a phase of the qualification system of the Copa Perú. Its purpose is to determine, through competitions organized within each department, the teams that represent their respective jurisdictions in the next stage of the competition, initially the Regional Stage.

The first edition of the Copa Perú began in 1966, with the District and Provincial stages. The first Departmental Leagues were subsequently played between February and March 1967, followed by the Regional Stage during April and May, and finally by the Final Stage, or Finalísima, held in May 1967. The Finalísima concluded on May 28, 1967, with Alfonso Ugarte de Chiclín becoming the first Copa Perú champion.

Although the first Departmental competitions were actually played during 1967, they are considered part of the 1966 edition, as they corresponded to the qualification process that had begun the previous year. Therefore, for historical purposes, the first edition of the Departmental Stage may be identified as 1966–67, while the stage itself was effectively played in 1967.

Subsequently, beginning in 1993, the calendar of the different stages of the competition was regularized so that the process would take place primarily within a single calendar year. The competition began with the District Stage during the first months of the year and continued successively through the Provincial, Departmental, and Regional stages, before culminating in the Final Stage, which was usually played toward the final months of the year or, in some cases, in January of the following year.

== Format ==
The tournament has 5 stages. The first stage of the tournament is the District Stage (Spanish: Etapa Distrital), played from February to May. Districts hold a small league tournament to determine its winners which will qualify for the next stage. The second stage is the Provincial Stage (Spanish: Etapa Provincial), played in June and July. The District winners play in groups and the winners qualify for the next stage. The third stage is the Departmental Stage (Spanish: Etapa Departamental), consisting of another league tournament, between July and September.

=== Stages ===
Level	Stage
4	Etapa Nacional (Copa Peru)
5	Ligas Departamentales
6	Ligas Provinciales
7	Ligas Distritales Primera División
8	Ligas Distritales Segunda División

== Liga Departamental de Amazonas ==
The Liga Departamental de Amazonas was founded on June 12, 1969.

=== List of champions ===
Ed.	Season	Champion	Runner-up
1	1967	Nor Oriente	
2	1968	Universitario	
3	1969	Higos Urco	
4	1970	Higos Urco	
5	1971	Universitario	
6	1972	Deportivo Hospital	
7	1973	Deportivo Hospital	
8	1974	Deportivo Hospital	
9	1975	Deportivo Hospital	
10	1976	Pedro Ruiz Gallo	
11	1977	Cultural Sachapuyos	
12	1978	Deportivo Hospital	
13	1979	Ministerio de Transportes	
14	1980	Deportivo Hospital	
15	1981	Deportivo Hospital	
16	1982	San Martín de El Milagro	
17	1983	Deportivo Hospital	
18	1984	San Martín de El Milagro	
19	1985	Defensor Cajaruro	
20	1986	Cultural Utcubamba	
21	1987	Alfonso Ugarte de La Peca	
22	1988	Deportivo Municipal (Bagua)	
23	1989	Deportivo Municipal (RdM)	
24	1990	Cultural Sachapuyos	
25	1991		
26	1992		
27	1993	Cultural Sachapuyos	
28	1994	Deportivo Hospital	
29	1995	Cultural Sachapuyos	
30	1996	Cultural Sachapuyos	
31	1997	Cultural Sachapuyos	
32	1998	Cultural Utcubamba	
33	1999	Cultural Sachapuyos	
34	2000	Cultural Sachapuyos	
35	2001	Agricobank San Lorenzo	
36	2002	Cultural Sachapuyos	
37	2003	Banco de la Nación	
38	2004	Sport Sealcas	Higos Urco
39	2005	Higos Urco	Sport Sealcas
40	2006	Asociación Amazonas	Deportivo Municipal (RdM)
41	2007	Unión Santo Domingo	Amazonas
42	2008	Agricobank San Lorenzo	Higos Urco
43	2009	San Francisco de Asís (Lonya Grande)	Unión Santo Domingo
44	2010	Vencedores del Cenepa	Unión Santo Domingo
45	2011	San Antonio de Chontapampa	Vencedores del Cenepa
46	2012	Deportivo Municipal (RdM)	Grupo Malca
47	2013	Bagua Grande	Deportivo Municipal (RdM)
48	2014	Bagua Grande	Defensor Libertad
49	2015	UPP	Bagua Grande
50	2016	Unión Santo Domingo	Higos Urco
51	2017	Unión Santo Domingo	Cultural Sachapuyos
52	2018	Bagua Grande	Alipio Ponce Vásquez
53	2019	Deportivo Municipal (Jazán)	Sporting Victoria
–	2020	Canceled due to the COVID-19 pandemic	
–	2021	Canceled due to the COVID-19 pandemic	
54	2022	Bagua Grande	Unión Santo Domingo
55	2023	Unión Santo Domingo	Deportivo Municipal (Jazán)
56	2024	Unión Santo Domingo	Cajaruro
57	2025	Bagua FC	Amazonas FC
58	2026	Cultural Sachapuyos	Juan Pablo II Amazonas

== Liga Departamental de Áncash ==
The Liga Departamental de Áncash was founded on January 11, 1965.

=== List of champions ===
Ed.	Season	Champion	Runner-up
1	1966	América de Samanco	Once Amigos (Huarmey)
2	1967	José Gálvez	Cultural Casma
3	1968	Juventud Bolívar	Corpesanta Hidro
4	1969	José Gálvez	Deportivo Belén
5	1970	José Gálvez	Corpesanta Hidro
6	1971	Deportivo Sogesa	Defensor Molinopampa
7	1972	Sider Perú	El Obrero
8	1973	Sider Perú	Sport Áncash
9	1974	Sider Perú	Sport Áncash
10	1975	José Gálvez	Sport Áncash
11	1976	Electro Perú	José Gálvez
12	1977	José Gálvez	Sport Áncash
13	1978	San Cristóbal de Moro	San Francisco
14	1979	José Gálvez	Sport Áncash
15	1980	José Gálvez	
16	1981	Sport Áncash	
17	1982	Deportivo Copes	Sport Áncash
18	1983	Sider Perú	
19	1984	Cultural Casma	Sport Áncash
20	1985	Sider Perú	
21	1986	Deportivo Belén	Cultural Casma
22	1987	Sport Áncash	
23	1988	Cultural Casma	Defensor Nicrupampa
24	1989	Defensor Nicrupampa	
25	1990	Ovación Sipesa	Defensor Nicrupampa
26	1991	Unión Juventud	
27	1992	Sport Áncash	
28	1993	José Gálvez	
29	1994	Pesca Perú	
30	1995	José Gálvez	
31	1996	José Gálvez	
32	1997	Unión Florida	Sport Áncash
33	1998	Sport Áncash	
34	1999	Sport Áncash	José Gálvez
35	2000	Sport Áncash	José Gálvez
36	2001	José Gálvez	Sport Áncash
37	2002	José Gálvez	Sport Rosario
38	2003	José Gálvez	Sport Áncash
39	2004	Sport Áncash	José Gálvez
40	2005	José Gálvez	Caballeros de la Ley
41	2006	Academia Sipesa	Renovación Condorarma
42	2007	Academia Sipesa	Sport Rosario
43	2008	Amenaza Verde	Tayca Chilcal
44	2009	Ramón Castilla	Juventud Culebreña
45	2010	La Victoria	Juventud Santa Rosa
46	2011	Universidad San Pedro	UNASAM
47	2012	Unión Juventud	Huracán de Toma
48	2013	Universidad San Pedro	El Obrero
49	2014	Sport Rosario	Universidad San Pedro
50	2015	Sport Áncash	DELUSA
51	2016	Sport Rosario	DELUSA
52	2017	José Gálvez	Alianza Vicos
53	2018	Sport Áncash	Academia Sipesa
54	2019	José Gálvez	Sport Áncash
–	2020	Canceled due to the COVID-19 pandemic	
–	2021	Canceled due to the COVID-19 pandemic	
55	2022	San Andrés de Runtu	Atlético Bruces
56	2023	San Marcos	Star Áncash
57	2024	Centro Social Pariacoto	Alianza Arenal
58	2025	Sport Ayash Huamanin	Real Puerto Chimbote
59	2026	Alianza Arenal	Sport Áncash

== Liga Departamental de Apurímac ==
The Liga Departamental de Apurímac was founded on April 28, 1955.

=== List of champions ===
Ed.	Season	Champion	Runner-up
1	1966	Libertad	
2	1967	Miguel Grau	
3	1968	Deportivo Bancario	
4	1969	Deportivo Bancario	
5	1970	Miguel Grau	
6	1971	Deportivo Bancario	
7	1972	Miguel Grau	
8	1973	Miguel Grau	
9	1974	Escuela Normal Mixta La Salle	
10	1975	Deportivo Municipal (Andahuaylas)	
11	1976	Antonio Ocampo	
12	1977	Miguel Grau	
13	1978	Miguel Grau	
14	1979	Miguel Grau	
15	1980	Miguel Grau	
16	1981	Deportivo Educación	
17	1982	Deportivo Educación	
18	1983	Deportivo Educación	
19	1984	Mariano Melgar	
20	1985	Mariano Melgar	
21	1986	Mariano Melgar	
22	1987	Miguel Grau	
23	1988	Miguel Grau	
24	1989	Miguel Grau	
25	1990	La Victoria	
26	1991	Deportivo Municipal (Chuquibambilla)	
27	1992	Alianza Talavera	
28	1993	Mariano Melgar	
29	1994	Deportivo Educación	
30	1995	Deportivo Municipal (Pacucha)	
31	1996	Gigantes del Cenepa	
32	1997	Los Chankas	
33	1998	Unión Grauína	
34	1999	Deportivo Educación	
35	2000	Kola Real	
36	2001	Deportivo Educación	
37	2002	Deportivo Educación	
38	2003	Deportivo Educación	
39	2004	José María Arguedas	Unión Grauína
40	2005	José María Arguedas	Deportivo Educación
41	2006	Deportivo Educación	Social El Olivo
42	2007	José María Arguedas	Deportivo Educación
43	2008	Sport Municipal	Deportivo Educación
44	2009	José María Arguedas	Deportivo Educación
45	2010	José María Arguedas	Cultural Santa Rosa
46	2011	Cultural Santa Rosa	José María Arguedas
47	2012	Apurímac	José María Arguedas
48	2013	Cultural Santa Rosa	José María Arguedas
49	2014	Miguel Grau	DECH
50	2015	Sport Municipal	Cultural Santa Rosa
51	2016	José María Arguedas	La Victoria
52	2017	José María Arguedas	Miguel Grau
53	2018	Retamoso	Andahuaylas FC
54	2019	Miguel Grau	Andahuaylas FC
–	2020	Canceled due to the COVID-19 pandemic	
–	2021	Canceled due to the COVID-19 pandemic	
55	2022	La Victoria	Social El Olivo
56	2023	Miguel Grau	FC Municipal Challhuahuacho
57	2024	Miguel Grau	Defensor José María Arguedas
58	2025	Instituto Apurímac	Cultural Huancarama
59	2026	Unión Minas de Pamputa	Miguel Grau

== Liga Departamental de Arequipa ==
The Liga Departamental del Arequipa was founded on May 8, 1966.

=== List of champions ===
Ed.	Season	Champion	Runner-up
1	1966	Sportivo Huracán	Marítimo Sport (Mollendo)
2	1967	Melgar	Marítimo Sport (Mollendo)
3	1968	Melgar	
4	1969	Melgar	
5	1970	Melgar	
6	1971	Deportivo Carsa	
7	1972	Sportivo Huracán	
8	1973	Piérola	
9	1974	Sportivo Huracán	
10	1975	Pesca Perú	
11	1976	Sportivo Huracán	
12	1977	Sportivo Huracán	Deportivo Estrella
13	1978	Pesca Perú	
14	1979	Pesca Perú	
15	1980	Sportivo Huracán	
16	1981	Real Madrid (Camaná)	
17	1982	Real Madrid (Camaná)	
18	1983	Sportivo Huracán	
19	1984	Deportivo Camaná	
20	1985	Deportivo Camaná	
21	1986	Alianza Naval	
22	1987	Aurora	
23	1988	Deportivo Camaná	
24	1989	Alianza Socabaya	
25	1990	Sportivo Huracán	
26	1991	Deportivo Camaná	
27	1992	Piérola	
28	1993	Estrella del Misti	
29	1994	Yanahuara	
30	1995	Sportivo Huracán	
31	1996	Piérola	Deportivo Camaná
32	1997	Mariscal Castilla (Cerro Colorado)	Unión Minas de Orcopampa
33	1998	Senati	Primero de Mayo
34	1999	Sportivo Huracán	Inclán Sport
35	2000	Atlético Universidad	
36	2001	Atlético Universidad	Deportivo Islay
37	2002	Atlético Universidad	Unión Minas de Orcopampa
38	2003	Sportivo Huracán	Juventus Corazón
39	2004	Senati	Juventus Corazón
40	2005	Senati	Atlético Mollendo
41	2006	Total Clean	Senati
42	2007	IDUNSA	Unión Minas de Orcopampa
43	2008	IDUNSA	Defensor Piérola
44	2009	Unión Minas de Orcopampa	Juventus Corazón
45	2010	Aurora	Sportivo Huracán
46	2011	Saetas de Oro	Unión Minas de Orcopampa
47	2012	José Granda	Aurora
48	2013	Saetas de Oro	Internacional
49	2014	Futuro Majes	Sportivo Cariocos
50	2015	La Colina	Sportivo Huracán
51	2016	La Colina	Binacional
52	2017	Binacional	Sportivo Huracán
53	2018	Sportivo Huracán	Social Corire
54	2019	Nacional	Futuro Majes
–	2020	Canceled due to the COVID-19 pandemic	
–	2021	Canceled due to the COVID-19 pandemic	
55	2022	Nacional	Los Tigres
56	2023	Nacional	Aurora
56	2024	Viargoca	Nacional
57	2025	Viargoca	Amigos de la PNP
58	2026	Viargoca	Virgen de las Nieves

== Liga Departamental de Ayacucho ==
The Liga Departamental de Ayacucho was founded on April 25, 1948.

=== List of champions ===
Ed.	Season	Champion	Runner-up
1	1966	Deportivo Inti	—^{[D]}
2	1967	UNSCH	Cultural Huracán
3	1968	Deportivo Arco	
4	1969	Alianza Huamanga	
5	1970	Centenario	
6	1971	Alianza Huamanga	
7	1972	Centenario	
8	1973	Centenario	
9	1974	Deportivo Beneficencia	
10	1975	Deportivo Beneficencia	
11	1976	Defensor San Lorenzo	
12	1977	Centenario	
13	1978	Centenario	
14	1979	Centenario	
15	1980	UNSCH	
16	1981	UNSCH	
17	1982	María Parado de Bellido	
18	1983	UNSCH	
19	1984	Ateneo	
20	1985	UNSCH	
21	1986	Social Magdalena	
22	1987	Social Magdalena	
23	1988	María Parado de Bellido	
24	1989	María Parado de Bellido	
25	1990	UNSCH	
26	1991	UNSCH	
27	1992	Deportivo Municipal (Palmapampa)	
28	1993	Deportivo DASA	
29	1994	Social Magdalena	
30	1995	Deportivo Huáscar	
31	1996	Deportivo Huáscar	
32	1997	Deportivo DASA	
33	1998	Deportivo DASA	
34	1999	Deportivo DASA	
35	2000	Percy Berrocal	
36	2001	Deportivo Huáscar	
37	2002	San Francisco	
38	2003	Juventud Gloria	
39	2004	Deportivo Huáscar	San Francisco (Huanta)
40	2005	Deportivo Municipal (Huamanga)	Sport Huamanga
41	2006	Sport Huamanga	Deportivo Municipal (Kimbiri)
42	2007	Sport Huamanga	Froebel Deportes
43	2008	Sport Huamanga	Deportivo Municipal (Huamanga)
44	2009	Deportivo Municipal (Huamanga)	Froebel Deportes
45	2010	Froebel Deportes	Deportivo Municipal (El Tambo)
46	2011	Sport Huracán	Deportivo Municipal (San Miguel)
47	2012	Sport Libertad	Deportivo Municipal (Pichari)
48	2013	Deportivo Municipal (Santillana)	IST Federico Gonzáles
49	2014	Player Villafuerte	Percy Berrocal
50	2015	Player Villafuerte	Deportivo Municipal (Kimbiri)
51	2016	Deportivo Municipal (Pichari)	Sport Huanta
52	2017	Los Audaces de Mayapo	Player Villafuerte
53	2018	Sport Huanta	San Cristobal de Casaorcco
54	2019	Sport Huanta	UNSCH
–	2020	Canceled due to the COVID-19 pandemic	
–	2021	Canceled due to the COVID-19 pandemic	
55	2022	Cultural Huracán	Sport Cáceres
56	2023	Sport Cáceres	VRAEM FC
57	2024	Señor de Quinuapata	Nuevo San Cristóbal
58	2025	Defensor Patibamba	Señor de Quinuapata
59	2026	Por la Santa FC	Defensor Patibamba

==== Footnotes ====
D. The Liga Departamental de Ayacucho proclaimed Deportivo Inti of Ayacucho as champion, awarding it qualification to the Regional Stage following the failure of the champions from Cora Cora and Huanta to appear.

== Liga Departamental de Cajamarca ==
The Liga Departamental de Cajamarca was founded on September 25, 1978.

=== List of champions ===
Ed.	Season	Champion	Runner-up
1	1966	Deportivo Municipal (Jaén)	
2	1967	Deportivo Bracamoros	
3	1968	Deportivo Normal	
4	1969	Asociación Bancarios	
5	1970	Deportivo Renovación	
6	1971	UTC	
7	1972	UTC	
8	1973	UTC	
9	1974	UTC	
10	1975	UTC	
11	1976	Deportivo Agronomía	
12	1977	UTC	
13	1978	UTC	
14	1979	UTC	
15	1980	UTC	
16	1981	Deportivo Agronomía	
17	1982	ADA	
18	1983	Defensor Baños del Inca	
19	1984	ADA	
20	1985	Estudiantes Casanovistas	
21	1986	ADA	
22	1987	ADA	
23	1988	Comerciantes Scorpion	
24	1989	Volante	
25	1990	ADA	
26	1991	Comerciantes Scorpion	
27	1992	Bellavista	
28	1993	Comerciantes Scorpion	
29	1994	ADA	
30	1995	UTC	
31	1996	UTC	
32	1997	UTC	
33	1998	UTC	
34	1999	Comerciantes Scorpión	
35	2000	Lira Jesuense	Deportivo Ilucán
36	2001	UTC	
37	2002	UTC	
38	2003	UTC	Unión Progreso
39	2004	Sporting Caxamarca	UTC
40	2005	Sporting Caxamarca	UTC
41	2006	ADA	Unión Progreso
42	2007	Deportivo Municipal (San Ignacio)	Deportivo Davy
43	2008	Comerciantes Unidos	San Cayetano
44	2009	Descendencia Michiquillay	Deportivo Municipal (San Ignacio)
45	2010	Comerciantes Unidos	Cultural Volante
46	2011	UTC	Cultural Volante
47	2012	Alianza Cutervo	Cruzeiro Porcón
48	2013	Santa Ana	Comerciantes Unidos
49	2014	Bellavista	ADA
50	2015	Deportivo Hualgayoc	Unión Bambamarca
51	2016	Deportivo Hualgayoc	Coopac NSR
52	2017	Real JL	Las Palmas
53	2018	Las Palmas	ADA
54	2019	Las Palmas	Cultural Volante
–	2020	Canceled due to the COVID-19 pandemic	
–	2021	Canceled due to the COVID-19 pandemic	
55	2022	Cultural Volante	Rosario Celendín
56	2023	ADA	Cajamarca
57	2024	Cajamarca	Cultural Volante
58	2025	ADA Cajabamba	Las Palmas
59	2026	ADA Cajabamba	El Combe

== Liga Departamental del Callao ==
The Liga Departamental del Callao was founded on August 1, 1975.

=== List of champions ===
Ed.	Season	Champion	Runner-up
1	1975	Hijos de Yurimaguas	Once Amigos Unión
2	1976	Deportivo SIMA	Once Amigos Unión
3	1977	Atlético Ayacucho	Deportivo SIMA
4	1978	Deportivo SIMA	Atlético Ayacucho
5	1979	Atlético Ayacucho	Grumete Medina
6	1980	Atlético Ayacucho	Defensor Reynoso
7	1981	Academia Cantolao	Víctor Marín
8	1982	Deportivo SIMA	ENAPU
9	1983	Grumete Medina	Hijos de Yurimaguas
10	1984	ENAPU	Estrella Azul
11	1985	CITEN	Deportivo SIMA
12	1986	Hijos de Yurimaguas	Unidad Vecinal Nº3
13	1987	KDT Nacional	Juventud Ford
14	1988	Defensor La Perla	Víctor Marín
15	1989	Nuevo Callao	Sucre San Jorge
16	1990	Grumete Medina	Estrella Azul
17	1991	Los Amigos	Deportivo Nacional
18	1992	Sport La Mercedes	Sucre San Jorge
19	1993	Los Amigos	Alfredo Alvarado
20	1994	ADEBAMI	Los Amigos
21	1995	Francisco Pizarro - Somos Aduanas	Santa Marina Norte
22	1996	Olímpico Bella Unión	Jesús Dulanto
23	1997	Olímpico Bella Unión	Deportivo SIMA
24	1998	Somos Aduanas	ADO Ventanilla
25	1999	Somos Aduanas	Jesús Dulanto
26	2000	Atlético Chalaco	Atlético Satélite
27	2001	Somos Aduanas	Atlético Chalaco
28	2002	Atlético Chalaco	Aurelio Colombo
29	2003	Defensor Mórrope	Deportivo SIMA
30	2004	Sport Las Mercedes	Defensor Tacna
31	2005	Atlético Chalaco	Juventud La Perla
32	2006	Deportivo SIMA	Atlético Chalaco
33	2007	Independiente Ayacucho	Atlético Pilsen Callao
34	2008	Atlético Chalaco	Atlético Pilsen Callao
35	2009	Atlético Pilsen Callao	Atlético Centenario
36	2010	Nuevo Callao	Atlético Pilsen Callao
37	2011	Nuevo Amanecer	América Callao
38	2012	Márquez	Juventud La Perla
39	2013	Juventud La Perla	Márquez
40	2014	ADEBAMI	América Latina
41	2015	Academia Cantolao	Juventud La Perla
42	2016	Sport Blue Rays	Cultural Peñarol
43	2017	Deportivo Yurimaguas	Sport Callao
44	2018	Alfredo Tomassini	AEB
45	2019	Estrella Azul	Juventud Palmeiras
–	2020	Canceled due to the COVID-19 pandemic	
–	2021	Canceled due to the COVID-19 pandemic	
46	2022	Luis Escobar	Estrella Azul
47	2023	Calidad Porteña	Juventud Palmeiras
48	2024	Scratch	Amazon Callao
49	2025	Calidad Porteña	Hacienda San Agustín
50	2026	Juventud Palmeiras	Estrella Roja

== Liga Departamental de Cusco ==
The Liga Departamental del Cusco was founded on February 15, 1974.

=== List of champions ===
Ed.	Season	Champion	Runner-up
1	1966	Cienciano	Manco II
2	1967	Cienciano	Social Magisterio (Calca)
3	1968	Deportivo Garcilaso	
4	1969	Deportivo Garcilaso	
5	1970	Cienciano	
6	1971	Cienciano	
7	1972	Cienciano	
8	1973	Salesiano	
9	1974	Deportivo Garcilaso	
10	1975	Deportivo Garcilaso	
11	1976	Manco II	
12	1977	Universitario	
13	1978	Universitario	
14	1979	Deportivo Garcilaso	
15	1980	Deportivo Garcilaso	
16	1981	Deportivo Garcilaso	
17	1982	Cienciano	
18	1983	Deportivo Tawantinsuyo	
19	1984	Deportivo Tawantinsuyo	
20	1985	Deportivo Tintaya	
21	1986	Guardia Republicana	
22	1987	Estudiantes Garcilaso	
23	1988	Estudiantes Garcilaso	
24	1989	Estudiantes Garcilaso	
25	1990	Deportivo Garcilaso	
26	1991	Deportivo Garcilaso	
27	1992		
28	1993	Deportivo Municipal (Quillabamba)	
29	1994	Antenor Escudero	
30	1995	Ingeniería Civil	
31	1996	Deportivo Garcilaso	
32	1997	Juventud Progreso	
33	1998	Deportivo Garcilaso	
34	1999	Tintaya Marquiri	
35	2000	Deportivo Garcilaso	
36	2001	Deportivo Garcilaso	
37	2002	Senati	
38	2003	Deportivo Garcilaso	
39	2004	Estudiantes Calca	Deportivo Garcilaso
40	2005	Deportivo Garcilaso	Estudiantes Calca
41	2006	Deportivo Municipal (Echarate)	Cienciano Junior
42	2007	Deportivo Garcilaso	Deportivo Municipal (Echarate)
43	2008	Deportivo Garcilaso	Santa Rosa (Quillabamba)
44	2009	Humberto Luna	Deportivo Garcilaso
45	2010	Real Garcilaso	Humberto Luna
46	2011	Virgen del Carmen	Humberto Luna
47	2012	Manco II	Estudiantes Calca
48	2013	Deportivo Yawarmayu	Real Municipal (Coporaque)
49	2014	Unión Alto Huarca	Deportivo Yawarmayu
50	2015	Alfredo Salinas	Deportivo Garcilaso
51	2016	Deportivo Garcilaso	Juventus Mollepata
52	2017	Deportivo Garcilaso	Deportivo Municipal (Quillabamba)
53	2018	Deportivo Garcilaso	Deportivo Robles
54	2019	Deportivo Garcilaso	Yawar's
–	2020	Canceled due to the COVID-19 pandemic	
–	2021	Canceled due to the COVID-19 pandemic	
55	2022	Deportivo Garcilaso	Defensor Cubillas
56	2023	AJI	Defensor Cubillas
57	2024	Juventud Progreso	Juventud Alfa
58	2025	Deportivo Múnich Sol Naciente	UNISPA
59	2026	Vinicunca FC	Deportivo Huayruro

== Liga Departamental de Huancavelica ==
The Liga Departamental del Huancavelica was founded on May 25, 1966.

=== List of champions ===
Ed.	Season	Champion	Runner-up
1	1966	UDA	
2	1967	UDA	Sport Machete
3	1968	UDA	
4	1969	UDA	
5	1970	Sport Machete	
6	1971	Hospital Centro de Salud	
7	1972	Sport Diamante	
8	1973	Estudiantes Unidos	
9	1974	Estudiantes Unidos	
10	1975	Sport Diamante	
11	1976	Estudiantes Unidos	
12	1977	Estudiantes Unidos	
13	1978	UDA	
14	1979	Deportivo Caminos	
15	1980	Social Julcani	
16	1981	Diablos Rojos	
17	1982	Unión Bellavista	
18	1983	Diablos Rojos	
19	1984	Diablos Rojos	
20	1985	Unión Minas de Julcani	
21	1986	Rosario Central	
22	1987	Santo Domingo	
23	1988	Cultural Bolognesi	
24	1989	UDA	
25	1990	Estudiantes Unidos	
26	1991	Racing FBC	
27	1992	7 de Agosto	
28	1993	7 de Agosto	
29	1994	Racing FBC	
30	1995	Diablos Rojos	
31	1996	7 de Agosto	
32	1997	UNH	
33	1998	Unión Recuperada	
34	1999	Leoncio Prado	
35	2000	Deportivo Municipal (Acobamba)	
36	2001	San Cristóbal	
37	2002	UDA	
38	2003	Diablos Rojos	
39	2004	Deportivo Municipal (Yauli)	Lúcuma Dorada
40	2005	Instituto Pedagógico	Deportivo Municipal (Acoria)
41	2006	Deportivo Municipal (Yauli)	Unión Minas Caudalosa
42	2007	Deportivo Municipal (Anchonga)	Deportivo Municipal (Ccochaccsa)
43	2008	Deportivo Municipal (Acobamba)	Deportivo Municipal (Acoria)
44	2009	Diablos Rojos	Social Lircay
45	2010	Santa Rosa PNP	UDA
46	2011	Deportivo Municipal (Paucará)	Unión Minas (Ccochaccasa)
47	2012	Deportivo Municipal (Yauli)	UDA
48	2013	Deportivo Municipal (Paucará)	Racing
49	2014	Social Lircay	Santa Rosa
50	2015	UDA	Racing
51	2016	UDA	Cultural Bolognesi
52	2017	Diablos Rojos	FC Huayrapata
53	2018	UDA	Deportivo Caminos
54	2019	UDA	Deportivo Atlas
–	2020	Canceled due to the COVID-19 pandemic	
–	2021	Canceled due to the COVID-19 pandemic	
55	2022	Deportivo Vianney	UNH
56	2023	Deportivo Vianney	Diablos Rojos
57	2024	UDA	Sport Machete
58	2025	Sport Machete	Diablos Rojos
59	2026	Sport Machete	Heraldos Negros

== Liga Departamental de Huánuco ==
The Liga Departamental de Huánuco was founded on July 22, 1984.

=== List of champions ===
Ed.	Season	Champion	Runner-up
1	1966	León de Huánuco	Unidad Sanitaria (Tingo María)
2	1967	León de Huánuco	
3	1968	León de Huánuco	
4	1969	León de Huánuco	
5	1970	León de Huánuco	
6	1971	León de Huánuco	
7	1972	Juan Bielovucic	
8	1973	Juan Bielovucic	
9	1974	Juan Bielovucic	
10	1975	Santa Rosa	
11	1976	Universidad Agraria de la Selva	
12	1977	Universidad Agraria de la Selva	
13	1978	Juan Bielovucic	
14	1979	Juan Bielovucic	
15	1980	Santa Rosa	
16	1981	Leoncio Prado	
17	1982	Defensor ANDA	
18	1983	Juan Gómez	
19	1984	Juan Bielovucic	
20	1985	Leoncio Prado	
21	1986	Leoncio Prado	
22	1987	Juan Gómez	
23	1988	Alianza Huánuco	
24	1989	Alianza Huánuco	
25	1990	Mariano Santos	
26	1991	Mariano Santos	
27	1992	Mariano Santos	
28	1993	Universitario	
29	1994	UNHEVAL	
30	1995	Juan Bielovucic	
31	1996	Unión Naranjillo	
32	1997	Unión Naranjillo	
33	1998	Señor de Puelles	
34	1999	Arabecks	
35	2000	León de Huánuco	
36	2001	León de Huánuco	
37	2002	León de Huánuco	
38	2003	León de Huánuco	
39	2004	Alianza Universidad	León de Huánuco
40	2005	Tambillo Grande	Señor de Puelles
41	2006	León de Huánuco	Tambillo Grande
42	2007	León de Huánuco	Alianza Universidad
43	2008	Alianza Universidad	León de Huánuco
44	2009	Alianza Universidad	León de Huánuco
45	2010	Alianza Universidad	Bella Durmiente
46	2011	Alianza Universidad	Negocios Unidos
47	2012	UNHEVAL	Unión Castillo Grande
48	2013	Unión Cayumba Grande	Real Panaococha
49	2014	Chacarita Juniors	Unión Tingo María
50	2015	Mariano Santos	Sport Boys (Tocache)
51	2016	Mariano Santos	Cultural Tarapacá
52	2017	Alianza Universidad	León de Huánuco
53	2018	Alianza Universidad	León de Huánuco
54	2019	Racing de Ambo	Tambillo Grande
–	2020	Canceled due to the COVID-19 pandemic	
–	2021	Canceled due to the COVID-19 pandemic	
55	2022	Deportivo Verdecocha	Señor de Mayo de Huancapata
56	2023	Independiente de Huachog	Castle FC
57	2024	Construcción Civil	Deportivo Municipal (Tingo María)
58	2025	Miguel Grau UDH	León de Huánuco
59	2026	Atlético EVZA	Constructores de Uchiza

== Liga Departamental de Ica ==
The Liga Departamental de Ica was founded on October 22, 1976.

=== List of champions ===
Ed.	Season	Champion	Runner-up
1	1966	Deportivo Huracán	Víctor Bielich (Pisco)
2	1967	Víctor Bielich (Pisco)	Francisco Oropeza
3	1968	Víctor Bielich (Pisco)	Deportivo Huracán
4	1969	Deportivo Huracán	Francisco Oropeza
5	1970	Construcción Civil	Francisco Oropeza
6	1971	Sport San Martín	Víctor Bielich (Pisco)
7	1972	Octavio Espinosa	Independiente Lima
8	1973	Octavio Espinosa	Estudiantes Unidos
9	1974	Alejandro Villanueva	Sport Bolognesi
10	1975	Olímpico de Acomayo	Sport Vitarte
11	1976	José Carlos Mariátegui	Juventud Aurora
12	1977	Olímpico de Acomayo	Alejandro Villanueva
13	1978	Octavio Espinosa	Juventud Barrios Altos
14	1979	Octavio Espinosa	Juventud San Carlos
15	1980	Defensor Mayta Cápac	Octavio Espinosa
16	1981	Octavio Espinosa	
17	1982	San Pablo	Deportivo Aviación
18	1983	Félix Donayre	Sport Buenos Aires
19	1984	Sport Bolívar	
20	1985	Félix Donayre	
21	1986	Once Estrellas	
22	1987	Sport Puerto Aéreo	
23	1988	Inmaculada Concepción	
24	1989	Sport Rex	
25	1990	Alejandro Villanueva	
26	1991	Unión San Martín	
27	1992	Cosmos San Isidro	
28	1993	Juan Mata	
29	1994	Independiente Los Ángeles	
30	1995	Juan Mata	
31	1996	Estudiantes de Medicina	
32	1997	Estudiantes de Medicina	
33	1998	Estudiantes de Medicina	
34	1999	Estudiantes de Medicina	
35	2000	Estudiantes de Medicina	Domingo Dianderas
36	2001	Aceros Arequipa	
37	2002	Santa Rita	Alfonso Ugarte
38	2003	Abraham Valdelomar	Julio Ramírez
39	2004	Sport Alfonso Ugarte	San José
40	2005	Abraham Valdelomar	José Carlos Mariátegui
41	2006	Sport Victoria	Alianza Pisco
42	2007	Juventud Miraflores	Sport Victoria
43	2008	Deportivo UNICA	Juventud Guadalupe
44	2009	Juventud Media Luna	Olímpico Peruano
45	2010	Joe Gutiérrez	Sport Victoria
46	2011	Defensor Zarumilla	Alianza Pisco
47	2012	Santos	Mayta Cápac
48	2013	Defensor Zarumilla	San Ignacio
49	2014	Defensor Zarumilla	Unión Progresista
50	2015	Juventud Barrio Nuevo	América de Palpa
51	2016	Carlos Orellana	Octavio Espinosa
52	2017	Unión San Martín	Parada de los Amigos
53	2018	Santos	Sport Marino
54	2019	Las Américas	Octavio Espinosa
–	2020	Canceled due to the COVID-19 pandemic	
–	2021	Canceled due to the COVID-19 pandemic	
55	2022	Unión San Martín	Los Libertadores
56	2023	Alianza Pisco	Lolo Fernández
57	2024	Juventud Santo Domingo	Sport Nacional
58	2025	Alianza Pisco	Juventud Ccontacc
59	2026	Domingo Dianderas	Bad Boys

== Liga Departamental de Junín ==
The Liga Departamental de Junín was founded on February 18, 1975.

=== List of champions ===
Ed.	Season	Champion	Runner-up
1	1966	Unión Ocopilla	Universitario de Tarma
2	1967	Universitario de Tarma	Unión Ocopilla
3	1968	Unión Ocopilla	
4	1969	Unión Ocopilla	
5	1970	ADT	
6	1971	Deportivo Junín	
7	1972	Deportivo Municipal (Huancayo)	
8	1973	Deportivo Junín	
9	1974	Deportivo Municipal (Huancayo)	
10	1975	ADT	
11	1976	Ramón Castilla (La Oroya)	
12	1977	Universidad del Centro del Perú	
13	1978	ADT	
14	1979	Progreso Muruhuay	
15	1980	Túpac Amaru	
16	1981	Ramón Castilla (La Oroya)	
17	1982	Hostal Rey	
18	1983	Deportivo Vasmer	
19	1984	Deportivo Vasmer	
20	1985	Mina San Vicente	
21	1986	Alipio Ponce	
22	1987	Unión Huayllaspanca	
23	1988	Túpac Amaru	
24	1989	Chanchamayo	
25	1990	ElectroPerú	
26	1991	Independiente Estudiantil	
27	1992	Sport Dos de Mayo	
28	1993	Deportivo Municipal Asociados	
29	1994	Cultural Hidro	
30	1995	Deportivo Municipal (El Tambo)	
31	1996	Cultural Hidro	
32	1997	Cultural Hidro	
33	1998	Cultural Hidro	
34	1999	Deportivo Municipal (El Tambo)	
35	2000	Cultural Hidro	
36	2001	Deportivo Municipal (El Tambo)	
37	2002	Sport Dos de Mayo	Deportivo Junín
38	2003	Echa Muni	Unión San Agustín
39	2004	Echa Muni	Santa Rita
40	2005	Echa Muni	Deportivo Municipal Asociados
41	2006	Deportivo Ingeniería	ADT
42	2007	Minera Corona	Sport Águila
43	2008	Wanka FC	Sport Huancayo
44	2009	Unión Juventud Carhuacatac	ADT
45	2010	Sport Dos de Mayo	ADT
46	2011	Deportivo Municipal (Mazamari)	Deportivo Municipal (Morococha)
47	2012	Alipio Ponce	Deportivo Municipal (Mazamari)
48	2013	Alipio Ponce	Sport Águila
49	2014	Unión Pichanaki	Echa Muni
50	2015	Sport La Vid	Trilce Internacional
51	2016	Sport Águila	Alipio Ponce
52	2017	ADT	Sport La Vid
53	2018	AD Huamantanga	Escuela JTR
54	2019	ADT	Escuela JTR
–	2020	Canceled due to the COVID-19 pandemic	
–	2021	Canceled due to the COVID-19 pandemic	
55	2022	CESA	Defensor Concepción
56	2023	CESA	Atlético Chanchamayo
57	2024	Deportivo Municipal (Pangoa)	Deportivo Sucre
58	2025	Unión Juventud Pomacocha	Atlético Chanchamayo
59	2026	CESA	Atlético Chanchamayo

== Liga Departamental de La Libertad ==
The Liga Departamental de La Libertad was founded on October 23, 1976.

=== List of champions ===
Ed.	Season	Champion	Runner-up
1	1966	Sanjuanista	Atlético Chalaco (Casa Grande)
2	1967	Carlos A. Mannucci	7 de Junio (Casa Grande)
3	1968	Alfonso Ugarte de Chiclín	Alianza Guadalupe
4	1969	Defensor Casa Grande	Rafael Químper (Paiján)
5	1970	Alfonso Ugarte de Chiclín	Elías Aguirre (Cartavio)
6	1971	Alianza San Pedro	Alfonso Ugarte de Chiclín
7	1972	Atlético Trujillano	Defensor Talambo (Chepén)
8	1973	Carlos A. Mannucci	Atlético Chalaco (Casa Grande)
9	1974	Cementos Pacasmayo	Atlético Trujillano
10	1975	Atlético Chalaco (Casa Grande)	Alianza San José
11	1976	Alianza San José	Atlético Trujillano
12	1977	Sanjuanista	Atlético Municipal (Chepén)
13	1978	Sanjuanista	Alfonso Ugarte de Chiclín
14	1979	Sanjuanista	Los Espartanos
15	1980	Sanjuanista	Sport Pilsen
16	1981	Sanjuanista	
17	1982	Sport Pilsen	
18	1983	Los Espartanos	
19	1984	Libertad	
20	1985	Libertad	
21	1986	15 de Septiembre	
22	1987	Víctor Haya de La Torre	
23	1988	Morba	
24	1989	Alfonso Ugarte de Chiclín	
25	1990	Alfonso Ugarte de Chiclín	
26	1991	Deportivo Halcones	
27	1992	Defensor Taller	
28	1993	ISP José Faustino Sánchez Carrión	
29	1994	Defensor Taller	
30	1995	Deportivo Marsa	Alfonso Ugarte de Chiclín
31	1996	Carlos A. Mannucci	
32	1997	Deportivo UPAO	
33	1998	Deportivo UPAO	
34	1999	Deportivo UPAO	
35	2000	Carlos A. Mannucci	
36	2001	Universidad César Vallejo	ISP José Faustino Sánchez Carrión
37	2002	Universidad César Vallejo	Los Halcones
38	2003	Universidad César Vallejo	Deportivo Comercio
39	2004	Defensor Porvenir	Sport Vallejo
40	2005	Independiente Ramón Castilla	Alianza Huamachuco
41	2006	Sport Vallejo	Carlos A. Mannucci
42	2007	Sport Vallejo	Carlos A. Mannucci
43	2008	Carlos A. Mannucci	Defensor Porvenir
44	2009	Universitario de Trujillo	Carlos A. Mannucci
45	2010	Carlos A. Mannucci	Miguel Grau (Huamachuco)
46	2011	Universitario de Trujillo	Carlos A. Mannucci
47	2012	Carlos A. Mannucci	Juventud Bellavista
48	2013	Deportivo Municipal (Huamachuco)	Carlos A. Mannucci
49	2014	Sport Chavelines	Racing
50	2015	Racing	Real Sociedad
51	2016	Racing	Sport Chavelines
52	2017	El Inca	Alfonso Ugarte de Chiclín
53	2018	Racing	El Inca
54	2019	Sport Chavelines	Deportivo Llacuabamba
–	2020	Canceled due to the COVID-19 pandemic	
–	2021	Canceled due to the COVID-19 pandemic	
55	2022	Real Sociedad	Atlético Verdún
56	2023	Defensor Porvenir	Alfonso Ugarte de Chiclín
57	2024	Juventus	El Inca
58	2025	Sport River	Juventud Bellavista
59	2026	Sport River	El Inca

== Liga Departamental de Lambayeque ==
The Liga Departamental de Lambayeque was founded on October 20, 1978.

=== List of champions ===
Ed.	Season	Champion	Runner-up
1	1966	Juan Aurich	Universitario (Lambayeque)
2	1967	San Lorenzo	Deportivo Municipal (Lambayeque)
3	1968	San Lorenzo	
4	1969	Unión Tumán	
5	1970	Unión Tumán	
6	1971	Deportivo Municipal (Lambayeque)	
7	1972	Cultural Pucalá	
8	1973	Cultural Pucalá	
9	1974	Cultural Pucalá	
10	1975	Cultural Pucalá	
11	1976	Boca Juniors	
12	1977	Deportivo Municipal (Chiclayo)	
13	1978	Los Aguerridos de Monsefú	
14	1979	Los Aguerridos de Monsefú	
15	1980	Corinthians	
16	1981	Atlético Porvenir	
17	1982	Deportivo Cañaña	Juan Aurich (Pítipo)
18	1983	Deportivo Cañaña	
19	1984	San Lorenzo (Ferreñafe)	
20	1985	Deportivo Cañaña	
21	1986	Juan Aurich	
22	1987	Piladora San Martín	
23	1988	Juan Pardo y Miguel	
24	1989	Siete de Enero	
25	1990	Siete de Enero	
26	1991	Universitario (Lambayeque)	
27	1992	San Lorenzo	
28	1993	Juan Pardo y Miguel	
29	1994	Boca Juniors	
30	1995	Sport Boys (Tumán)	
31	1996	Mariscal Sucre (Ferreñafe)	
32	1997	Juan Aurich	
33	1998	Deportivo Pomalca	Cachorro
34	1999	Deportivo Pomalca	
35	2000	Deportivo Pomalca	
36	2001	Deportivo Pomalca	
37	2002	Flamengo	
38	2003	Flamengo	
39	2004	Flamengo	Universidad de Chiclayo
40	2005	Boca Junior (Ferreñafe)	Juan Aurich
41	2006	Boca Junior (Ferreñafe)	Juan Aurich
42	2007	Juan Aurich	Cruzada Deportiva
43	2008	Deportivo Pomalca	Universidad Señor de Sipán
44	2009	Universidad de Chiclayo	Dínamo
45	2010	Universidad Señor de Sipán	Deportivo Pomalca
46	2011	Los Caimanes	Deportivo Pomalca
47	2012	Deportivo Pomalca	Willy Serrato
48	2013	Universidad Señor de Sipán	Willy Serrato
49	2014	La Nueva Alianza	Sport Boys (Tumán)
50	2015	Construcción Civil	Alianza Vista Alegre
51	2016	Pirata	La Nueva Alianza
52	2017	Juan Aurich Pastor	Carlos Stein
53	2018	Pirata	Carlos Stein
54	2019	Carlos Stein	JJ Arquitectura
–	2020	Canceled due to the COVID-19 pandemic	
–	2021	Canceled due to the COVID-19 pandemic	
55	2022	Nueva Esperanza	La Balsa
56	2023	Juan Pablo II College	Juventud La Joya
57	2024	Deportivo Lute	Unión Juventud San Martín
58	2025	Deportivo Tumi	Cachorro
59	2026	Cachorro	Cruz de Chalpón

== Liga Departamental de Lima ==
The Liga Departamental de Lima was founded on January 21, 1967.

=== List of champions ===
Ed.	Season	Champion	Runner-up
1	1966	Óscar Berckemeyer	Walter Ormeño
2	1967	Aurora Chancayllo	Independiente de Deportes
3	1968	Social Huando	Walter Ormeño
4	1969	Walter Ormeño	Social Huando
5	1970	Social Huando	Walter Ormeño
6	1971	Independiente	Círcolo Sportivo Paramonga
7	1972	Juventud La Palma	Independiente
8	1973	Unión Huaral	Walter Ormeño
9	1974	Independiente	Juventud La Palma
10	1975	Deportivo Municipal (Barranca)	Independiente
11	1976	Juventud La Palma	Walter Ormeño
12	1977	Atlético Chalaco (Cañete)	Atlético Huacho
13	1978	Independiente	San José (Huacho)
14	1979	Independiente	Sporting Cristal (Supe Puerto)
15	1980	Independiente	Marítima Pesquera
16	1981	Independiente	
17	1982	Juventud La Joya	Mariscal Sucre (Paramonga)
18	1983	Bella Esperanza	
19	1984	Telefunken 20	
20	1985	Bella Esperanza	Real Independiente
21	1986	Bella Esperanza	Juventud Torre Blanca
22	1987	Bella Esperanza	Juventud Lauriama
23	1988	No champion crowned.^{[A]}	
24	1989	Sport Dinámicos	Ricardo Bentín (Matucana)
25	1990	No champion crowned.^{[B]}	
26	1991	No champion crowned.^{[C]}	
27	1992	San José de Manzanares	Tres Unidos
28	1993	Sporting Cristal (Supe Puerto)	
29	1994	Independiente	
30	1995	Virgen de Chapi	
31	1996	AELU	Unión Supe
32	1997	San José de Manzanares	
33	1998	Telefunken 20	
34	1999	Aurora Chancayllo	
35	2000	Aurora Chancayllo	Independiente
36	2001	La Esmeralda	Unión Buenos Aires
37	2002	Juventud Torre Blanca	
38	2003	Nicolás de Piérola	Atlético Minero
39	2004	Juventud Torre Blanca	Independiente
40	2005	Atlético Minero	Residencial Huaral
41	2006	Hijos de Acosvinchos	Jesús del Valle
42	2007	Cooperativa Bolognesi	Óscar Benavides
43	2008	Íntimo Cable Visión	Unión Supe
44	2009	Juventud La Rural	DIM
45	2010	Juventud Barranco	Géminis
46	2011	Estudiantes Condestable	Pacífico
47	2012	Deportivo Municipal	Walter Ormeño
48	2013	AIPSA	Unión Huaral
49	2014	Aurora Chancayllo	Juventud América
50	2015	DIM	Defensor Laure Sur
51	2016	Venus	DIM
52	2017	Defensor Laure Sur	Somos Olímpico
53	2018	Defensor Laure Sur	Venus
54	2019	Maristas	DIM
–	2020	Canceled due to the COVID-19 pandemic	
–	2021	Canceled due to the COVID-19 pandemic	
55	2022	Paz Soldán	Independiente San Felipe
56	2023	Deportivo Huracán	Maristas
57	2024	Real Independiente	Pacífico
58	2025	Real Huarcos	ASA
59	2026	Bella Esperanza	Arsenal Lawn Tennis

==== Footnotes ====
A. In 1988, the final between Atlético Soledad (Paramonga) and Asociación Empleados (Mala) was not played.
B. In 1990, the final between Alfonso Ugarte (Huaura) and Juan Bazalar Lamas (Huacho) was not played.
C. In 1991, the final between Unión Supe and Atlético Real Mala was not played.

== Liga Departamental de Loreto ==
The Liga Departamental de Loreto was founded on July 4, 1975.

=== List of champions ===
Ed.	Season	Champion	Runner-up
1	1966	CNI	Mariscal Castilla (Pucallpa)
2	1967	CNI	
3	1968	CNI	
4	1969	CNI	
5	1970	CNI	
6	1971	Politécnico	
7	1972	CNI	
8	1973	Sport Loreto	
9	1974	Ex Alumnos Agustinos	
10	1975	Deportivo Aviación	
11	1976	Deportivo Aviación	
12	1977	Deportivo Aviación	
13	1978	Ex Alumnos Agustinos	
14	1979	Deportivo Aviación	
15	1980	Sport Molinera Giulfo	
16	1981	Sport Molinera Giulfo	
17	1982	Sport Alfonso Ugarte	
18	1983	Capitán Clavero	
19	1984	Hungaritos Agustinos	
20	1985	Ex Alumnos Agustinos	
21	1986	Capitán Clavero	
22	1987	Agricobank	
23	1988	Deportivo Cahuide	
24	1989	Sport Loreto (Yurimaguas)	
25	1990	Sport Nauta	
26	1991	Deportivo Cahuide	
27	1992	Libertad	
28	1993	Politécnico	
29	1994	Libertad	
30	1995	José Pardo	
31	1996	CNI	
32	1997	CNI	
33	1998	CNI	
34	1999	José Pardo	
35	2000	UNAP	
36	2001	CNI	
37	2002	CNI	
38	2003	UNAP	
39	2004	UNAP	San Juan de Miraflores
40	2005	CNI	UNAP
41	2006	CNI	Estudiantil San Pablo
42	2007	UNAP	CNI
43	2008	CNI	ADO
44	2009	UNAP	San Francisco de Asís (Contamana)
45	2010	Los Tigres	UNAP
46	2011	Los Tigres	Genaro Herrera
47	2012	Alianza Cristiana	UNAP
48	2013	Bolívar	CNI
49	2014	CNI	San Francisco (Requena)
50	2015	Bolívar	Red de Salud
51	2016	Estudiantil CNI	Kola San Martín
52	2017	Estudiantil CNI	Kola San Martín
53	2018	Estudiantil CNI	Deportivo Caballo Cocha
54	2019	Comerciantes	Deportivo Manaos
–	2020	Canceled due to the COVID-19 pandemic	
–	2021	Canceled due to the COVID-19 pandemic	
55	2022	Estudiantil CNI	Comerciantes
56	2023	Atlético Hospital	PCR Ex 160
57	2024	Estudiantil CNI	Dolce Bretaña
58	2025	Nihue Rao	Defensor Balsapuerto
59	2026	Atlético Nacional	UNAP

== Liga Departamental de Madre de Dios ==
The Liga Departamental de Madre de Dios was founded on April 22, 1966.

=== List of champions ===
Ed.	Season	Champion	Runner-up
1	1966	Sacachispas	
2	1967	Deportivo Maldonado	
3	1968	Mariscal Cáceres	
4	1969	Mariscal Cáceres	
5	1970	Fray Martín de Porres	
6	1971	Sacachispas	
7	1972	Fray Martín de Porres	
8	1973	Colegio Nacional Billinghurst	
9	1974	Colegio Nacional Billinghurst	
10	1975	Sport Miguel Grau	
11	1976	Sport Miguel Grau	
12	1977	Sport Miguel Grau	
13	1978	Juventud La Joya	
14	1979	Deportivo Maldonado	
15	1980	Juventud La Joya	
16	1981	Juventud La Joya	
17	1982	Juventud La Joya	
18	1983	Juventud La Joya	
19	1984	Deportivo Maldonado	
20	1985		
21	1986	Deportivo Maldonado	
22	1987	Deportivo Maldonado	
23	1988		
24	1989	Deportivo Maldonado	
25	1990		
26	1991		
27	1992	Deportivo Maldonado	
28	1993	30 de Agosto	
29	1994	Estudiantes Unidos	
30	1995	Estudiantes Unidos	
31	1996	Estudiantes Unidos	
32	1997	30 de Agosto	
33	1998	Miguel Grau	
34	1999	Deportivo Maldonado	
35	2000	Hospital Santa Rosa	
36	2001	30 de Agosto	
37	2002	30 de Agosto	
38	2003	Atlético Porteño	
39	2004	Fray Martín de Porres	Atlético Porteño
40	2005	Fray Martín de Porres	Deportivo Maldonado
41	2006	MINSA	Atlético Porteño
42	2007	MINSA	Fray Martín de Porres
43	2008	Juventud La Joya	MINSA
44	2009	MINSA	Juventud La Joya
45	2010	Juventud La Joya	MINSA
46	2011	MINSA	Deportivo Maldonado
47	2012	MINSA	Deportivo Maldonado
48	2013	30 de Agosto	MINSA
49	2014	MINSA	Deportivo Maldonado
50	2015	MINSA	Fray Martín de Porres
51	2016	MINSA	Deportivo Maldonado
52	2017	Deportivo Maldonado	MINSA
53	2018	Deportivo Maldonado	MINSA
54	2019	Deportivo Maldonado	Hospital Santa Rosa
–	2020	Canceled due to the COVID-19 pandemic	
–	2021	Canceled due to the COVID-19 pandemic	
55	2022	Deportivo Maldonado	Atlético Municipal Iñapari
56	2023	La Masía Nace	Real Atlético Nueva
57	2024	Alto Rendimiento	AFC Caychihue
58	2025	La Masía Nace	Colegio Nacional Billinghurst
59	2026	ADEVIL	La Masía Nace

== Liga Departamental de Moquegua ==
The Liga Departamental de Moquegua was founded on October 19, 1972.

=== List of champions ===
Ed.	Season	Champion	Runner-up
1	1966	Atlético Huracán	
2	1967	Atlético Huracán	
3	1968	Escuela Normal	
4	1969	AJ Estudiantes Católicos	
5	1970	Social Chalaca	
6	1971	Social Chalaca	
7	1972	Deportivo Coishco	
8	1973	Deportivo Coishco	
9	1974	La Breña	
10	1975	La Breña	
11	1976	Unión Pesquero	
12	1977	La Breña	
13	1978	La Breña	
14	1979	La Breña	
15	1980	Mariscal Nieto	
16	1981	La Breña	
17	1982	Atlético Huracán	
18	1983	Atlético Huracán	
19	1984	Mariscal Nieto	
20	1985	Juvenil Los Ángeles	
21	1986	Unión América	
22	1987	Mariscal Nieto	
23	1988	Juvenil Los Ángeles	
24	1989	Mariscal Nieto	
25	1990		
26	1991		
27	1992		
28	1993	América	
29	1994	Mariscal Nieto	
30	1995	Atlético Huracán	
31	1996	Atlético Huracán	
32	1997	Atlético Huracán	
33	1998	Peñarol	
34	1999	La Breña	
35	2000	La Breña	
36	2001	Mariscal Nieto	
37	2002	Mariscal Nieto	
38	2003	Deportivo Enersur	
39	2004	Deportivo Enersur	Mariscal Nieto
40	2005	Atlético Huracán	Social Chalaca
41	2006	Deportivo Enersur	Deportivo GER
42	2007	Academia Ticsani	Deportivo GER
43	2008	Cobresol	Atlético Huracán
44	2009	Deportivo Enersur	San Lino de Omate
45	2010	Atlético Huracán	San Lino de Omate
46	2011	Atlético Huracán	Social EPISA
47	2012	Social EPISA	AEXA Santa Cruz
48	2013	Estudiantes Alas Peruanas	San Simón
49	2014	Mariscal Nieto	Deportivo Enersur
50	2015	Deportivo Enersur	Atlético Huracán
51	2016	Deportivo Enersur	Mariscal Nieto
52	2017	Credicoop San Cristóbal	Atlético Huracán
53	2018	Credicoop San Cristóbal	Hijos del Altiplano y del Pacífico
54	2019	Credicoop San Cristóbal	Juvenil Quele
–	2020	Canceled due to the COVID-19 pandemic	
–	2021	Canceled due to the COVID-19 pandemic	
55	2022	Credicoop San Cristóbal	Mariscal Nieto
56	2023	Hijos del Altiplano y del Pacífico	UCV Moquegua
57	2024	Real San Antonio	Hijos del Altiplano y del Pacífico
58	2025	Hijos del Altiplano y del Pacífico	Barrio 12
59	2026	Liberty School College	Atlético Huracán

== Liga Departamental de Pasco ==
The Liga Departamental de Pasco was founded on May 31, 1976.

=== List of champions ===
Ed.	Season	Champion	Runner-up
1	1966	Carlos Valdivieso	UNDAC
2	1967	Estudiantil Carrión	
3	1968	Centro Tarmeño	
4	1969	Sport Ideal	
5	1970	Carlos Valdivieso	
6	1971	Alianza Huarón	
7	1972	Estudiantil Carrión	
8	1973	Estudiantil Carrión	
9	1974	Unión Minas (Atacocha)	
10	1975	Unión Minas (Atacocha)	
11	1976	Unión Minas (Atacocha)	
12	1977	Unión Minas	
13	1978	Unión Minas	
14	1979	UNDAC	
15	1980	UNDAC	
16	1981	Planta de Carbón	
17	1982	Universitario de Chontabamba	
18	1983	Estudiantil Carrión	
19	1984	Unión Minas	
20	1985	Unión Minas (Uchuchaucca)	
21	1986	Universitario de Chontabamba	
22	1987	UNDAC	
23	1988	UNDAC	
24	1989	UNDAC	
25	1990	UNDAC	
26	1991	Operaciones Tajo	
27	1992		
28	1993	Unión Mercado	
29	1994	Universitario de Yanacancha	
30	1995	Nueva Berna	
31	1996	Unión Social Oxapampa	
32	1997	Sport Sausa	
33	1998	UNDAC	
34	1999	Nueva Berna	
35	2000	UNDAC	
36	2001	Unión Mercado	
37	2002	UNDAC	
38	2003	Columna Pasco	
39	2004	Cultural Guadalupe	UNDAC
40	2005	Real Generación Aprominc	Universitario (Yanacancha)
41	2006	Real Generación Aprominc	Universitario (Yanacancha)
42	2007	Columna Pasco	Deportivo Municipal (Yanahuanca)
43	2008	Deportivo Municipal (Yanahuanca)	Unión Minas
44	2009	Sport Ticlacayán	Deportivo Municipal (Yanahuanca)
45	2010	Sport Ticlacayán	Unión Minas
46	2011	Juventud Ticlacayán	Sport Ticlacayán
47	2012	Rancas	Juventud Ticlacayán
48	2013	Real Santiago Allauca	Ecosem
49	2014	Ecosem	Sociedad Tiro 28
50	2015	Alipio Ponce	Sociedad Tiro 28
51	2016	Deportivo Municipal (Oxapampa)	Sport Ticlacayán
52	2017	Deportivo Municipal (Yanahuanca)	Alipio Ponce
53	2018	Deportivo Municipal (Yanahuanca)	San Agustín
54	2019	Juventud Municipal	San Juan de Yanacocha
–	2020	Canceled due to the COVID-19 pandemic	
–	2021	Canceled due to the COVID-19 pandemic	
55	2022	Ecosem Pasco	Once Caldas
56	2023	Ecosem Pasco	Sociedad Tiro 28
57	2024	Sociedad Tiro 28	Ecosem Pasco
58	2025	Unión Minas	Deportivo Municipal (Palcazú)
59	2026	Sociedad Tiro 28	Academia Pepe

== Liga Departamental de Piura ==
The Liga Departamental del Piura was founded on August 4, 1989.

=== List of champions ===
Ed.	Season	Champion	Runner-up
1	1966	Alianza Atlético	Juan de Mori (Catacaos)
2	1967	Sport Chorrillos	Alianza Atlético
3	1968	Alianza Atlético	Atlético Torino
4	1969	Atlético Torino	Alianza Atlético
5	1970	UD Talara	Alianza Atlético
6	1971	Atlético Grau	Alianza Atlético
7	1972	Storm	Defensor Chulucanas
8	1973	Sport Blondell	Cultural Tambogrande
9	1974	Atlético Torino	Sport Bellavista
10	1975	Storm	Ricardo Palma
11	1976	Atlético Torino	Olimpia
12	1977	Sport Bellavista	UNP
13	1978	UNP	NEICOP
14	1979	Sport Belavista	Atlético Grau
15	1980	Atlético Grau	Sport Bellavista
16	1981	Atlético Grau	
17	1982	Sport Liberal	Sport Bellavista
18	1983	Alianza Atlético	Sport Liberal
19	1984	Atlético Grau	Alianza Atlético
20	1985	UNP	
21	1986	Alianza Atlético	Halcones FAP
22	1987	Atlético Torino	Estrella Roja
23	1988	Nueva Esperanza	Sporting La Capilla
24	1989	Túpac Amaru	
25	1990	José Olaya (Talara)	
26	1991	Defensor Buenos Aires	Defensor Malacasí
27	1992	San Miguel	José Olaya (Paita)
28	1993	Atlético Grau de Mallaritos	Deportivo El Ñuro
29	1994	Atlético Torino	
30	1995	Túpac Amaru	Alianza Junín
31	1996	I.M.I.	Alfonso Ugarte (Vice)
32	1997	Atlético Grau	I.M.I.
33	1998	I.M.I.	UNP
34	1999	UNP	
35	2000	Atlético Grau	UD Talara
36	2001	Atlético Grau	I.M.I.
37	2002	Atlético Grau	Refineros
38	2003	Atlético Grau	Atlético Torino
39	2004	Academia Municipal	Olimpia
40	2005	UDT Aviación	Olimpia
41	2006	Olimpia	Corazón Micaelino
42	2007	Cosmos	Atlético Torino
43	2008	Atlético Torino	Olimpia
44	2009	Atlético Grau	Cultural Progreso
45	2010	Atlético Grau	Salesiano
46	2011	José Olaya (Sechura)	9 de Octubre
47	2012	José Olaya (Paita)	José Olaya (Sechura)
48	2013	Defensor La Bocana	Atlético Grau
49	2014	Defensor La Bocana	Atlético Grau
50	2015	Defensor La Bocana	Túpac Amaru
51	2016	Atlético Grau	San Antonio
52	2017	Atlético Grau	Asociación Torino
53	2018	Atlético Torino	UDP
54	2019	Sport Chorrillos (Querecotillo)	Sport Estrella
–	2020	Canceled due to the COVID-19 pandemic	
–	2021	Canceled due to the COVID-19 pandemic	
55	2022	Atlético Torino	Defensor La Bocana
56	2023	Olimpia	Academia Cristo Rey
57	2024	Juventud Cautivo	Deportivo Municipal (Vice)
58	2025	Atlético Torino	Jibaja Che
59	2026	Atlético Torino	Deportivo Caysa Yapatera

== Liga Departamental de Puno ==
The Liga Departamental de Puno was founded on November 12, 1971.

=== List of champions ===
Ed.	Season	Champion	Runner-up
1	1966	Unión Carolina	American Star (Juliaca)
2	1967	Unión Carolina	
3	1968	Salesianos	
4	1969	Salesianos	
5	1970	Salesianos	
6	1971	Alfonso Ugarte	
7	1972	Alfonso Ugarte	
8	1973	Alfonso Ugarte	
9	1974	Salesianos	
10	1975	Deportivo Universitario	
11	1976	American Star	
12	1977	Deportivo Universitario	
13	1978	American Star	
14	1979	Carlos Varea	
15	1980	American Star	
16	1981	Carlos Varea	
17	1982	American Star	
18	1983	Atlético Agrario	
19	1984	Bancos Unidos	
20	1985	Salesianos	
21	1986	Bancos Unidos	
22	1987	Salesianos	
23	1988	Alianza Rural	
24	1989		
25	1990		
26	1991	Salesianos	
27	1992	Carlos Varea	
28	1993	Lunar de Oro	
29	1994	Alfonso Ugarte	
30	1995	Deportivo Universitario	
31	1996	Deportivo Universitario	
32	1997	Deportivo Universitario	
33	1998	Alfonso Ugarte	
34	1999	Alfonso Ugarte	
35	2000	Alfonso Ugarte	
36	2001	Alfonso Ugarte	
37	2002	Franciscano San Román	Alfonso Ugarte
38	2003	Franciscano San Román	Alfonso Ugarte
39	2004	Franciscano San Román	Alfonso Ugarte
40	2005	Alfonso Ugarte	Unión Carolina
41	2006	Unión Carolina	UANCV
42	2007	Real Carolino	ADESA
43	2008	Diablos Rojos	Policial Santa Rosa
44	2009	Franciscano San Román	Diablos Rojos
45	2010	Alianza Unicachi	Unión Fuerza Minera
46	2011	Franciscano San Román	Estudiantes Puno
47	2012	Alfonso Ugarte	Binacional
48	2013	Binacional	Unión Fuerza Minera
49	2014	Binacional	Unión Fuerza Minera
50	2015	Unión Fuerza Minera	Alfonso Ugarte
51	2016	Unión Fuerza Minera	Credicoop San Román
52	2017	Alfonso Ugarte	SIEN Carabaya
53	2018	Alfonso Ugarte	Credicoop San Román
54	2019	Credicoop San Román	Alfonso Ugarte
–	2020	Canceled due to the COVID-19 pandemic	
–	2021	Canceled due to the COVID-19 pandemic	
55	2022	FC Cahusiños	Deportivo Universitario
56	2023	Unión Ángeles de Vizcachani	Diablos Rojos
57	2024	Unión Soratira	Cultural Tambillo
58	2025	ANBA Perú	San Martín Tours
59	2026	Leones de Anccaca	CEFUT Juliaca

== Liga Departamental de San Martín ==
The Liga Departamental de San Martín was founded on October 26, 1972.

=== List of champions ===
Ed.	Season	Champion	Runner-up
1	1966	Atlético Belén	
2	1967	Unión Progreso	
3	1968	Cultural Juanjuí	
4	1969	Cultural Juanjuí	
5	1970	Cultural Juanjuí	
6	1971	Cultural Juanjuí	
7	1972	Saposoa FBC	
8	1973	Sargento Tejada	
9	1974	Deportivo Cali	
10	1975	Deportivo Hospital	
11	1976	Deportivo Hospital	
12	1977	Deportivo Unidad de Salud	
13	1978	Deportivo Hospital	
14	1979	Unión Zona Agraria	
15	1980	Unión Zona Agraria	
16	1981	Deportivo Cali	
17	1982	Deportivo Cali	
18	1983	Deportivo Cali	
19	1984	7 de Agosto	
20	1985	7 de Agosto	
21	1986	Hospital Rural	
22	1987	Unión Tarapoto	
23	1988	Cultural Juanjuí	
24	1989	Deportivo Comercio	
25	1990	El Tumi	
26	1991	Santa Rosa	
27	1992	San Antonio de Uchiza	
28	1993	Asociación Deportiva Ingeniería	
29	1994	Atlético Nacional	
30	1995	El Tumi	
31	1996	El Tumi	
32	1997	Power Maíz	
33	1998	Hospital Rural	
34	1999	El Tumi	
35	2000	Power Maíz	Deportivo Pesquero (Moyobamba)
36	2001	Deportivo Comercio	Deportivo Cali
37	2002	Atlético Belén	El Tumi
38	2003	Deportivo Pesquero (Moyobamba)	El Tumi
39	2004	El Tumi	Deportivo Comercio
40	2005	Huallaga	Emilio San Martín
41	2006	Deportivo Comercio	Deportivo Cali
42	2007	El Tumi	Unión Tarapoto
43	2008	Santa Rosa (Morales)	Huallaga
44	2009	Unión Tarapoto	Deportivo Cali
45	2010	Unión Comercio	Atlético Belén
46	2011	Huallaga	San Juan
47	2012	Santos	Sport Alto Mayo
48	2013	Deportivo Cali	Unión César Vallejo
49	2014	Atlético Nacional	Unión César Vallejo
50	2015	Constructora Trujillo	Unión Tarapoto
51	2016	San José de Agua Blanca	Unión César Vallejo
52	2017	José Carlos Mariátegui	Saposoa
53	2018	Unión Tarapoto	Bellavista
54	2019	El Dorado	AD Tahuishco
–	2020	Canceled due to the COVID-19 pandemic	
–	2021	Canceled due to the COVID-19 pandemic	
55	2022	Academia CIMAC	Agua San Martín
56	2023	AD Tahuishco	Unión Tarapoto
57	2024	Deportivo Ucrania	Biavo
58	2025	Grandez	Alianza Tres Unidos
59	2026	Shanao FC	Sport Huaja

== Liga Departamental de Tacna ==
The Liga Departamental de Tacna was founded on November 5, 1976.

=== List of champions ===
Ed.	Season	Champion	Runner-up
1	1966	Coronel Bolognesi	
2	1967	Coronel Bolognesi	
3	1968	Mariscal Miller	
4	1969	Mariscal Miller	
5	1970	Coronel Bolognesi	
6	1971	Coronel Bolognesi	
7	1972	Coronel Bolognesi	
8	1973	Coronel Bolognesi	
9	1974	Coronel Bolognesi	
10	1975	Defensor Tacna	
11	1976	Mariscal Miller	
12	1977	Mariscal Miller	
13	1978	Mariscal Miller	
14	1979	Química Sol	
15	1980	Deportivo Victoria	
16	1981	Defensor Tacna	
17	1982	Universitario de Tacna	
18	1983	Universitario de Tacna	
19	1984	Universitario de Tacna	
20	1985	Defensor Arica (Locumba)	
21	1986	Centauro Guardia Republicana	
22	1987	Villa Hermosa	
23	1988		
24	1989		
25	1990	Mariscal Miller	
26	1991		
27	1992	Universitario de Tacna	
28	1993	Mariscal Cáceres (Calana)	
29	1994	Coronel Bolognesi	
30	1995	Coronel Bolognesi	
31	1996	Coronel Bolognesi	
32	1997	Coronel Bolognesi	
33	1998	Coronel Bolognesi	
34	1999	Coronel Bolognesi	
35	2000	Coronel Bolognesi	
36	2001	Sport Bolito	
37	2002	Bureau	
38	2003	Mariscal Miller	
39	2004	Mariscal Miller	Coronel Bolognesi
40	2005	Alfonso Ugarte de Tacna	Unión Alfonso Ugarte
41	2006	Alfonso Ugarte de Tacna	Mariscal Miller
42	2007	Defensor UNTAC	Bolognesi Zepita
43	2008	Dínamo de Solabaya	Deportivo Municipal (Locumba)
44	2009	Mariscal Miller	Unión Alfonso Ugarte
45	2010	Unión Alfonso Ugarte	Unión Mirave
46	2011	Mariscal Miller	Sport Nevados
47	2012	Bolognesi Zepita	Deportivo Credicoop
48	2013	Coronel Bolognesi	4 de Diciembre
49	2014	San Pedro	Deportivo Credicoop
50	2015	Coronel Bolognesi	Sport Junior
51	2016	Coronel Bolognesi	Bentín Tacna Heroica
52	2017	Coronel Bolognesi	Mariscal Miller
53	2018	Unión Alfonso Ugarte	Juventud Locumba
54	2019	Coronel Bolognesi	Juventud Alba Roja
–	2020	Canceled due to the COVID-19 pandemic	
–	2021	Canceled due to the COVID-19 pandemic	
55	2022	Virgen de la Natividad	Coronel Bolognesi
56	2023	Bentín Tacna Heroica	Defensor Tacna
57	2024	Bentín Tacna Heroica	Patriotas
58	2025	Real Sociedad	Dínamo de Solabaya
59	2026	Virgen de la Natividad	Vendaval Azul

== Liga Departamental de Tumbes ==
The Liga Departamental de Tumbes was founded on March 12, 1978.

=== List of champions ===
Ed.	Season	Champion	Runner-up
1	1966	Sport Tumbes	Deportivo Ferrocarril
2	1967	Sport Tumbes	
3	1968	Húsares de Junín	
4	1969	Deportivo Ferrocarril	
5	1970	Círculo Rojo	
6	1971	Húsares de Junín	
7	1972	Húsares de Junín	
8	1973	Húsares de Junín	
9	1974	Deportivo Municipal (Papayal)	
10	1975	Sport Unión	
11	1976	Húsares de Junín	
12	1977	Comercial Aguas Verdes	
13	1978	Comercial Aguas Verdes	
14	1979	Leoncio Prado	
15	1980	Palmeiras	
16	1981	Deportivo Arequipa	
17	1982	Sport Pampas	
18	1983	Mariscal Castilla	
19	1984	Mariscal Castilla	
20	1985	Comercial Aguas Verdes	
21	1986	Comercial Aguas Verdes	
22	1987	Inca Juniors	
23	1988	Deportivo Pacífico	
24	1989	Deportivo Promaresa	
25	1990	Deportivo Promaresa	
26	1991	Leoncio Prado	
27	1992	Sport Buenos Aires	
28	1993	Sport Cabuyal	
29	1994	Alianza Tumbesina	
30	1995	Alianza Tumbesina	
31	1996	Independiente Aguas Verdes	
32	1997	Independiente Aguas Verdes	
33	1998	Víctor Loli	
34	1999	Independiente Aguas Verdes	
35	2000	Sport Pampas	
36	2001	Sporting Pizarro	
37	2002	Independiente	
38	2003	Sporting Pizarro	
39	2004	Independiente Aguas Verdes	Unión Pacífico
40	2005	Sporting Pizarro	UD Chulucanas
41	2006	Sport Pampas	Defensor Arica
42	2007	Unión Pacífico	Sporting Pizarro
43	2008	Renovación Pacífico	Sport Buenos Aires
44	2009	Defensor San José	Barza Sporting
45	2010	Sporting Pizarro	Defensor San José
46	2011	Sport Buenos Aires	José Chiroque Cielo
47	2012	Sporting Pizarro	Académicos Alfred Nobel
48	2013	UD Chulucanas	Sport San Martín
49	2014	Cristal Tumbes	Defensor Bolívar
50	2015	Cristal Tumbes	José Chiroque Cielo
51	2016	Cristal Tumbes	Comercial Aguas Verdes
52	2017	Independiente Aguas Verdes	Sport El Tablazo
53	2018	Deportivo Ferrocarril	UNT
54	2019	Alianza Zorritos	UNT
–	2020	Canceled due to the COVID-19 pandemic	
–	2021	Canceled due to the COVID-19 pandemic	
55	2022	Deportivo Ferrocarril	Leoncio Prado
56	2023	Renovación Pacífico	Boca Juniors (La Choza)
57	2024	Sport Bolognesi	UD Tacna Libre
58	2025	UNT	Independiente Zorritos
59	2026	Deportivo Pacífico	UD Chulucanas

== Liga Departamental de Ucayali ==
The Liga Departamental del Ucayali was founded on February 24, 1981.

=== List of champions ===
Ed.	Season	Champion	Runner-up
1	1980	Ostolaza Castilla	
2	1981	Ostolaza Castilla	
3	1982	Deportivo Hospital	
4	1983	Deportivo Cooptrip	
5	1984		
6	1985		
7	1986	San Martín de Porres	
8	1987	Deportivo Hospital	
9	1988	Deportivo Bancos	
10	1989	Ostolaza Castilla	
11	1990	Cosmos (Aguaytía)	
12	1991	Deportivo Municipal (Callería)	
13	1992		
14	1993	La Loretana	
15	1994	Alianza Callao	
16	1995	La Loretana	
17	1996	San Martín de Porres	
18	1997	San Martín de Porres	
19	1998	San Martín de Porres	
20	1999	Atlético Callao	
21	2000	San Juan	
22	2001	UNU	
23	2002	San Juan	
24	2003	San Juan	
25	2004	San Juan	Deportivo Siloe
26	2005	Deportivo Hospital	UNU
27	2006	Sport Loreto	Deportivo Hospital
28	2007	UNU	Deportivo Hospital
29	2008	Tecnológico	Santa Rosa
30	2009	Tecnológico	Deportivo Bancos
31	2010	Deportivo Hospital	Atlético Pucallpa
32	2011	Defensor San Alejandro	UNU
33	2012	Deportivo Municipal (Purús)	Defensor San Alejandro
34	2013	Sport Loreto	Deportivo Bancos
35	2014	Sport Loreto	Santa Rosa
36	2015	Deportivo Municipal (Callería)	Deportivo Municipal (Aguaytía)
37	2016	Defensor Neshuya	UNU
38	2017	Comandante Alvariño	Defensor San Alejandro
39	2018	Colegio Comercio	Deportivo Municipal (Aguaytía)
40	2019	Deportivo Municipal (Aguaytía)	Colegio Comercio
–	2020	Canceled due to the COVID-19 pandemic	
–	2021	Canceled due to the COVID-19 pandemic	
41	2022	Colegio Comercio	La Paz
42	2023	Inter FC	Escuela Municipal de Tournavista
43	2024	Rauker	Real Von Humboldt
44	2025	Colegio Comercio	Atlético Nacional
45	2026	Deportivo Bancos	Deportivo Municipal (Atalaya)

== See also ==
- List of football clubs in Peru
- Peruvian football league system
