= Saetas de Oro =

Peruvian football club

- Full name: Club Deportivo Saetas de Oro
- Nicknames: Los Albos; Los Lobos Blancos
- Founded: April 2, 1975; 50 years ago
- Ground: Estadio Municipal de La Joya, Mollendo
- Capacity: 2,000
- League: Copa Perú
| Home colours | Away colours |

Club Deportivo Saetas de Oro (sometimes referred as Saetas de Oro) is a Peruvian football club, playing in the city of La Joya, Arequipa, Peru.

== History ==
The Club Saetas de Oro was founded on April 2, 1975.

In 2011 Copa Perú, the club qualified to the Regional Stage, but was eliminated by Unión Minas de Orcopampa in the Semifinals.

In 2012 Copa Perú, the club qualified to the Departamental Stage, but was eliminated by Atlético Mollendo.

In 2013 Copa Perú, the club qualified to the National Stage, but was eliminated by San Simón in the Quarterfinals.

In 2016 Copa Perú, the club qualified to the Provincial Stage, but was eliminated by Binacional.

In 2017 Copa Perú, the club qualified to the Provincial Stage, but was eliminated in the Cuadrangular Final.

== Honours ==
=== Regional ===
- Liga Departamental de Arequipa:

Runner-up (2): 2011, 2013

- Liga Provincial de Arequipa:

Winners (3): 2009, 2011, 2013
Runner-up (1): 2015

- Liga Distrital de La Joya:

Winners (7): 2008, 2010, 2011, 2013, 2016, 2017, 2018

== See also ==
- List of football clubs in Peru
- Peruvian football league system
