= Deportivo Maldonado de Puerto Maldonado =

Peruvian football club

Deportivo Maldonado
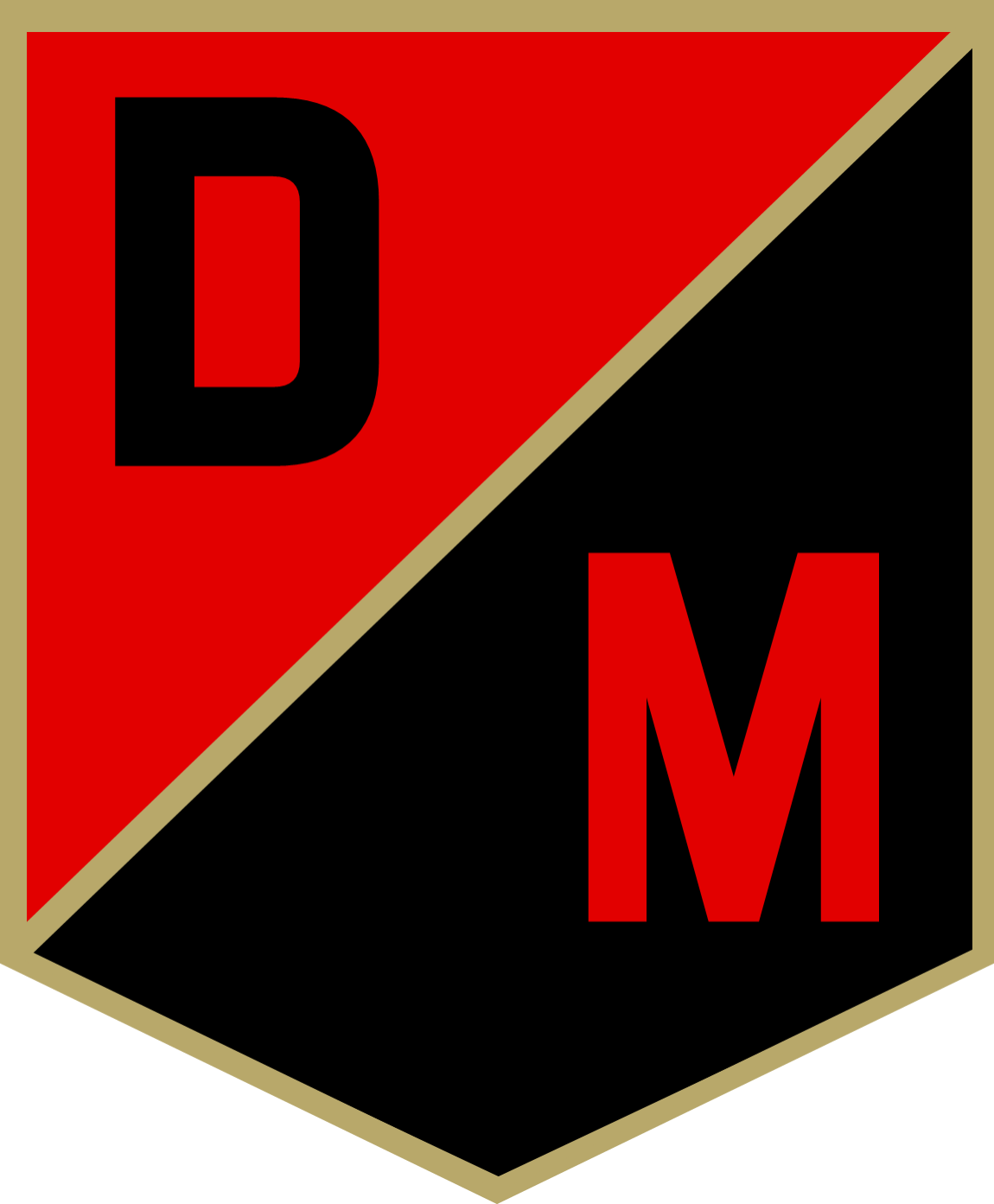
- Full name: Club Deportivo Maldonado
- Nickname(s): El Decano, Los rojinegros
- Founded: October 8, 1935
- Ground: Estadio IPD de Puerto Maldonado
- Capacity: 2,000
- Chairman: Juan Ramón Bayona
- League: Copa Perú
- 2019: Eliminated in National Stage
Home colours

Club Deportivo Maldonado is a Peruvian football club, based in the city of Puerto Maldonado, Madre de Dios. Founded in 1935, the club participates in the Copa Perú, the fourth tier of the Peruvian football league system.

== History ==
In the 1985 Copa Perú, the club qualified to the National Stage, but was eliminated by in the Final Group. In the 1999 Copa Perú, the club qualified to the Regional Stage, but was eliminated by Alfonso Ugarte and Deportivo Tintaya. In the 2005 Copa Perú, the club qualified to the Regional Stage, but was eliminated in the Group A. In the 2011 Copa Perú, the club qualified to the Regional Stage, but was eliminated in the Group A.

== Stadium ==
Deportivo Maldonado plays their home games at Estadio IPD de Puerto Maldonado, located in the clubs home city Puerto Maldonado. The stadium has a capacity of 2,000.

== Honours ==
=== Regional ===
- Liga Departamental de Madre de Dios:

Winners (9): 1967, 1979, 1984, 1989, 1999, 2017, 2018, 2019, 2022
Runner-up (5): 2005, 2011, 2012, 2014, 2016

- Liga Provincial de Tambopata:

Winners (2): 2011, 2017
Runner-up (5): 2014, 2016, 2018, 2019, 2022

- Liga Distrital de Tambopata:

Winners (7): 2011, 2014, 2016, 2017, 2022, 2023, 2024
Runner-up (3): 2018, 2019

== See also ==
- List of football clubs in Peru
- Peruvian football league system
