= Defensor Zarumilla =

Peruvian football club

- Full name: Club Social y Deportivo Defensor Zarumilla
- Founded: August 15, 1942
- Ground: Estadio 12 de Noviembre
- League: Copa Perú
- 2017: Eliminated in Departamental Stage
Home colours

Defensor Zarumilla is a Peruvian football club, playing in the city of Nazca, Ica, Peru.

== History ==
In the 2010 Copa Perú, the club qualified to Departamental Stage, but was eliminated by Sport Victoria in the Semifinals.

In the 2011 Copa Perú, the club qualified to National Stage, but was eliminated by ADT in the Round of 16.

In the 2013 Copa Perú, the club qualified to Regional Stage, but was eliminated by Deportivo Municipal (Paucará) and Deportivo Municipal (Santillana) in the Group Stage.

In the 2014 Copa Perú, the club qualified to National Stage, but was eliminated by Unión Pichanaki in the Quarterfinals.

In the 2015 Copa Perú, the club qualified to Provincial Stage, but was eliminated by Juventud Santa Fe in the Second Stage.

In the 2016 Copa Perú, the club qualified to Departamental Stage, but was eliminated by Carlos Orellana in the Quarterfinals.

In the 2019 Copa Perú, the club qualified to Departamental Stage, but was eliminated by Octavio Espinosa in the Semifinals.

== Honours ==
=== Regional ===
- Región VI:

Winners (2): 2011, 2014
Runner-up (1): 2012

- Liga Departamental de Ica:

Winners (3): 2011, 2013, 2014

- Liga Provincial de Nasca:

Winners (5): 1991, 2009, 2010, 2011, 2014

- Liga Distrital de Nasca:

Winners (5): 1991, 2009, 2010, 2011, 2014

== See also ==
- List of football clubs in Peru
- Peruvian football league system
