= Mariscal Miller =

- Full name: Club Deportivo Mariscal Miller
- Nickname(s): Carasucias
- Founded: January 18, 1961
- Ground: Jorge Basadre, Tacna
- Capacity: 19,850
- League: Copa Perú
Home colours	Away colours

Club Deportivo Mariscal Miller (sometimes referred as Mariscal Miller) is a Peruvian football club, playing in the city of Tacna, Tacna, Peru.

== History ==
The Club Deportivo Mariscal Miller was founded on January 18, 1961.

In the 2003 Copa Perú, the club qualified to the Regional Stage, but was eliminated by Deportivo Enersur.

In the 2004 Copa Perú, the club qualified to the Regional Stage, but was eliminated by Juventus Corazón.

In the 2006 Copa Perú, the club qualified to the Regional Stage, but was eliminated by Total Clean.

In the 2009 Copa Perú, the club qualified to the Regional Stage, but was eliminated by Unión Minas de Orcopampa.

In the 2017 Copa Perú, the club qualified to the National Stage, but was eliminated when it finished in 40th place.

== Honours ==
=== Regional ===
- Región VIII:

Runner-up (1): 2003

- Liga Departamental de Tacna:

Winners (9): 1968, 1969, 1976, 1977, 1978, 2003, 2004, 2009, 2011
Runner-up (2): 2006, 2017

- Liga Provincial de Tacna:

Winners (5): 1976, 1978, 2003, 2009, 2011
Runner-up (3): 2015, 2017, 2018

- Liga Distrital de Tacna:

Winners (9): 1968, 1969, 1976, 2008, 2009, 2010, 2011, 2015, 2016
Runner-up (2): 2017, 2018

== See also ==
- List of football clubs in Peru
- Peruvian football league system
