= Universitario de Trujillo =

Peruvian football club

- Full name: Club Universitario de Trujillo
- Nickname(s): La UT, Cremas del Norte
- Founded: July 10, 1965
- Ground: Estadio Mansiche, Trujillo, Peru
- Capacity: 25,000
- Chairman: Juan Carlos Sanchez Sanchez
- League: Copa Perú
- 2013: Eliminated in District Stage
Home colours

Universitario de Trujillo is a Peruvian football club, playing in the city of Trujillo, Peru. They currently play in the second division of the Liga Distrital de Trujillo.

== History ==
In the 2009 Copa Perú, the club qualified to the National Stage, but was eliminated by Defensor San José of Tumbes.

In the 2011 Copa Perú, the club qualified to the National Stage, but was eliminated by Los Caimanes in the Round of 16.

== Honours ==
=== Regional ===
- Región II: 1

Winners (1): 2009
Runner-up (1): 2011

- Liga Departamental de La Libertad: 2

Winners (2): 2009, 2011

- Liga Distrital de Trujillo: 2

Winners (2): 1983, 2009
Runner-up (3): 2000, 2008, 2011

== See also ==
- List of football clubs in Peru
- Peruvian football league system
