= Alianza Pisco =

- Full name: Club Sport Alianza Pisco
- Founded: 26 January 1923; 102 years ago
- Ground: Estadio Teobaldo Pinillos Olaechea, Pisco
- Chairman: (Peru) Luis Díaz Tumay
- Manager: (Peru) Edwin Pérez
- League: Copa Perú
Home colours

Alianza Pisco is a Peruvian football club located in the city of Pisco, Peru.

== History ==
The Club Sport Alianza Pisco was founded in 1923.

In 2006 Copa Perú, the club qualified to the Regional Stage but was eliminated by Sport Victoria and Sport Huamanga.

In 2011 Copa Perú, the club qualified to the Regional Stage but was eliminated by Sport Victoria.

In 2012 Copa Perú, the club qualified to the Departamental Stage but was eliminated by Mayta Cápac in the Semifinals.

== Honours ==
=== Senior titles ===
Keys

- Record
- ^{(s)} Shared record

Type	Competition	Titles	Runner-up	Winning years	Runner-up years
Regional (League)	Liga Departamental de Ica	2	2	2023, 2025	2006, 2011
Regional (League)	Liga Provincial de Pisco	5	2	2005, 2007, 2009, 2011, 2023	2024, 2025
Regional (League)	Liga Distrital de Pisco	9	4	1986, 1987, 1988, 1995, 2006, 2017, 2022, 2024, 2025	2009, 2011, 2014, 2023

== See also ==
- List of football clubs in Peru
- Peruvian football league system
