= Club Deportivo Universidad Nacional de Ucayali =

Peruvian football club

Universidad Nacional de Ucayali
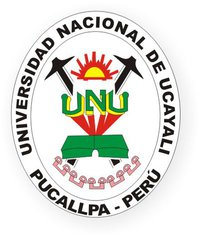
- Full name: Club Deportivo Universidad Nacional de Ucayali
- Founded: 1979
- Ground: Estadio Aliardo Soria, Pucallpa
- Capacity: 15,000
- League: Copa Perú
- 2016: Eliminated in National Stage
Home colours	Away colours

Universidad Nacional de Ucayali is a Peruvian football club, playing in the city of Pucallpa, Ucayali, Peru.

== History ==
Universidad Nacional de Ucayali was founded in 1979 as the Universidad Nacional of Pucallpa. In December 1983, the club changed his name to Universidad Nacional de Ucayali.

In the 2001 Copa Perú, the club qualified to National Stage but was eliminated by Universidad César Vallejo of Trujillo.

In the 2007 Copa Perú, the club qualified to National Stage but was eliminated by Deportivo Hospital of Pucallpa.

In the 2011 Copa Perú, the club qualified to the National Stage, but was eliminated by Pacífico of Lima in the quarterfinals.

== Honours ==
=== Regional ===
- Región III:

Winners (3): 2001, 2007, 2011

- Liga Departamental de Ucayali:

Winners (3): 2001, 2005, 2007
Runner-up (2): 2011, 2016

== See also ==
- List of football clubs in Peru
- Peruvian football league system
