= Club José María Arguedas =

Peruvian football club

José María Arguedas
- Full name: Club José María Arguedas
- Founded: 1942; 84 years ago
- Ground: Estadio Los Chankas, Andahuaylas
- League: Copa Perú
- 2017: Eliminated in Quarterfinals
Home colours

José María Arguedas is a Peruvian football club, located in the city of Andahuaylas, Apurímac, Peru.

== History ==
The club was founded with the name of club José María Arguedas in honor of the Peruvian writer José María Arguedas.

In the 2009 Copa Perú, the club qualified to the National Stage but was eliminated by Unión Alfonso Ugarte of Tacna.

== Honours ==
=== Regional ===
- Región VIII:

Winners (1): 2009

- Liga Departamental de Apurímac:

Winners (7): 2004, 2005, 2007, 2009, 2010, 2016, 2017
Runner-up (3): 2011, 2012, 2013

- Liga Provincial de Andahuaylas:

Winners (2): 2009, 2013, 2016
Runner-up (1): 2017

- Liga Distrital de Andahuaylas:

Winners (3): 2009, 2013
Runner-up (6): 2015, 2016, 2019, 2022, 2023, 2025, 2026

== See also ==
- List of football clubs in Peru
- Peruvian football league system
