= Unión Minas de Orcopampa =

Peruvian football club

- Full name: Asociación Deportiva Unión Minas
- Founded: January 8, 1980
- Ground: Estadio Municipal de Orcopampa, Arequipa
- League: Copa Perú
- 2013: Eliminated in Departmental Stage
- Website: https://unionminasdeorcopampa.blogspot.com/
| Home colours | Away colours |

Asociación Deportiva Unión Minas is a Peruvian football club, playing in the city of Orcopampa, Arequipa, Peru.

== History ==
In 2009 Copa Perú, the club advanced to the National Stage, but was eliminated by Diablos Rojos of Puno.

In 2011 Copa Perú, the club advanced to the National Stage, but was eliminated by Real Garcilaso of Cuzco in the Round of 16.

== Honours ==
=== Regional ===
- Región VII:

Winners (1): 2009
Runner-up (2): 2007, 2011

- Liga Departamental de Arequipa:

Winners (1): 2009
Runner-up (3): 2002, 2007, 2011

- Liga Superior de Arequipa:

Winners (1): 2009

- Liga Provincial de Castilla:

Winners (7): 1997, 1998, 2000, 2001, 2002, 2003, 2008

- Liga Distrital de Orcopampa:

Winners (2): 1997, 1998

== See also ==
- List of football clubs in Peru
- Peruvian football league system
