= 2017 Ligas Departamentales del Peru =

Ligas Departamentales del Peru
- Season: 2017
- Biggest home win: BOL 22–0 JVL
- Highest scoring: BOL 22–0 JVL

The 2017 Ligas Departamentales, the fifth division of Peruvian football (soccer), was played by variable number teams by Departament.

== Liga Departamental de Amazonas ==
=== First stage ===
==== Group A ====
Pos	Team	Pld	W	D	L	GF	GA	GD	Pts	Qualification	ASL	SFS	SPV
1	Agricobank San Lorenzo	3	3	0	0	11	2	+9	9	Advance to Second stage	—	4–0	3–2
2	San Felipe Santiago	4	1	1	2	3	10	−7	4		0–4	—	3–2
3	Sporting Victoria	3	0	1	2	4	6	−2	1		N.P.	4–4	—

Source: Departamental de Amazonas – fecha 6
Rules for classification: 1) points; 2) goal difference; 3) goals scored; 4) draw.

==== Group B ====
Pos	Team	Pld	W	D	L	GF	GA	GD	Pts	Qualification	BAG	LIB	SLO
1	Bagua Grande	4	3	1	0	19	2	+17	10	Advance to Second stage	—	9–1	0–0
2	Libertad de Bagua	4	2	1	1	10	5	+5	7		0–3	—	2–1
3	Selva Oriente	4	0	0	4	4	26	−22	0		1–7	1–8	—

Source: Departamental de Amazonas – fecha 6
Rules for classification: 1) points; 2) goal difference; 3) goals scored; 4) draw.

==== Group C ====
Pos	Team	Pld	W	D	L	GF	GA	GD	Pts	Qualification	USD	JUC	UNP
1	Unión Santo Domingo	4	4	0	0	16	4	+12	12	Advance to Second stage	—	2–1	5–1
2	Deportivo Municipal (Jucusbamba)	4	2	0	2	15	14	+1	6		1–5	—	8–6
3	Unión Progreso	4	0	0	4	4	26	−22	0		1–4	1–5	—

Source: Departamental de Amazonas – fecha 6
Rules for classification: 1) points; 2) goal difference; 3) goals scored; 4) draw.

==== Group D ====
Pos	Team	Pld	W	D	L	GF	GA	GD	Pts	Qualification	DPS	CDO	SCO
1	Sachapuyos	4	4	0	0	18	1	+17	12	Advance to Second stage	—	7–0	W.O.
2	CD Onchic	3	1	0	2	4	12	−8	3		1–5	—	W.O.
3	San Cristóbal del Olto	3	0	0	3	0	9	−9	−3		W.O.	N.P.	—

Source: Departamental de Amazonas – fecha 6
Rules for classification: 1) points; 2) goal difference; 3) goals scored; 4) draw.

=== Second stage ===
Semifinals
Agricobank San Lorenzo	1	0	1
Unión Santo Domingo	2	1	3
Sachapuyos	3	1	4
Bagua Grande	1	1	2

Finals
Unión Santo Domingo	2
Sachapuyos	1

== Liga Departamental de Áncash ==
First stage
Unión Huancarhuaz	0	2	2
Juventud Huaraz	5	5	10
AD Unión Áncash	7	7	14
Miraflores de Huaylas	0	0	0
Real Nuevo Acas	0	1	1
La Trinindad	2	0	2
San Pedro de Carash	3	2	5
Juventud Carhuayoc	1	2	3
Alianza Lima de Bolognesi	0	3	3
Deportivo Bolognesi	0	7	7
Sport Juventud de Cátac	5	3	8
Defensor Player de Rurimarac	2	2	4
River Santa	2	5	7
HDC Mancos	1	1	2
Halcones de Tumpa	2	2	4 (2)
Alianza Vicos (p)	2	2	4 (4)
El Chasqui	1	0	1
Centro Unión Carrizal	0	4	4
Once Amigos	3	3	6
Panamericana Miramar	1	1	2
DELUSA	2	0	2
José Gálvez (a)	1	1	2
Alfonso Ugarte (Santa)	8	3	11
Las Vegas Santa Isabel	0	0	0
AD Socosbamba	1	1	2
Estrella Roja	0	4	4
Virgen del Rosario	2	5	7
San Miguel	1	2	3

Second stage
Juventud Huaraz	3	2	5
Unión Áncash	3	0	3
La Trinidad (a)	0	2	2
San Pedro de Carash	1	1	2
Deportivo Bolognesi	1	0	1
Sport Juventud de Cátac	3	3	6
River Santa	2	0	2
Alianza Vicos	3	1	4
Centro Unión Carrizal (a)	1	2	3
Once Amigos	1	2	3
José Gálvez	2	2	4
(Alfonso Ugarte (Santa)	1	2	3
Estrella Roja	1	0	1
Virgen del Rosario	1	1	2

Quarterfinals
Sport Juventud de Cátac	5	1	6
La Trinidad de La Merced	0	1	1
Juventud Huaraz	0	1	1
Alianza Vicos	2	0	2
Centro Unión Carrizal	2	0	2
José Gálvez	4	5	9
Virgen del Rosario
bye

Semifinals
Sport Juventud de Cátac	0	1	1
Alianza Vicos	3	2	5
José Gálvez	4	2	6
Virgen del Rosario	0	3	3

Finals
Alianza Vicos	1	1	2
José Gálvez	3	0	3

== Liga Departamental de Apurímac ==
=== First stage ===
Santiago Apóstol and Defensor Uripa from the Chincheros District received a bye to the second round.

Teams			Scores		
1st leg home team	Points	2nd leg home team	1st leg	2nd leg	Pen.
Universitario UTEA	6:0	Colegio Mariátegui	8–0	2–0	–
Barrio Soncco	0:6	Miguel Grau	0–12	0–4	–
Andahuaylas	4:1	Unión Panamericana	2–2	3–1	–
Patrón Santiago	0:6	José María Arguedas	0–4	1–7	–
San Nicolás de Vilcabamba	0:6	Minas las Bambas	1–2	0–6	–
Unión Pumamarca	1:4	Señor de Huanca	1–2	1–1	–

=== Second stage ===
Teams			Scores		
1st leg home team	Points	2nd leg home team	1st leg	2nd leg	Pen.
Universitario UTEA	6:0	Señor de Huanca	1–0	2–0	–
Mina las Bambas	1:1	Miguel Grau	1–1	0–0	–
Andahuaylas	6:0	Defensor Uripa	3–0	2–0	–
Juventud San Lorenzo	0:6	José María Arguedas	0–3	0–5	–

=== Final stage ===
Pos	Team	Pld	W	D	L	GF	GA	GD	Pts	Qualification	JMA	CMG	UTA	AFC
1	José María Arguedas	6	3	2	1	10	5	+5	11	Advance to National stage	—	2–0	1–1	4–1
2	Miguel Grau	6	3	1	2	7	6	+1	10	Advance to National stage	2–1	—	0–0	2–1
3	Universitario UTEA	6	2	3	1	5	4	+1	9		0–1	2–1	—	2–1
4	Andahuaylas	6	0	2	4	4	11	−7	2		1–1	2–0	0–0	—

Source: Departamental de Apurímac – fecha 6 cuadrangular
Rules for classification: 1) points; 2) goal difference; 3) goals scored; 4) draw.

== Liga Departamental de Arequipa ==
=== First stage ===
Teams				Scores			
Group	1st leg home team	Points	2nd leg home team	1st leg	2nd leg	Extra leg	Pen.
A	La Aguadita	3:3	Internacional Majes	3–2	1–7	0–3	–
B	Deportivo Estrella	6:0	Minero Charco	1–0	4–2	–	–
C	Futuro Majes	3:3	Los Chinitos de Atico	0–2	1–0	2–3	–
D	Sportivo Huracán	4:1	Sport Boys de Mollendo	1–1	2–1	–	–
E	Juventud Pampacolca	3:3	Unión Huacapuy	2–1	0–1	1–1	4–5
F	Inclán Sport	0:6	Cerritos los Libres	0–3	1–4	–	–

==== Group G ====
Pos	Team	Pld	W	D	L	GF	GA	GD	Pts	Qualification	EMB	SOC	JUA
1	Binacional	2	2	0	0	4	0	+4	6	Advance to Second stage	—	—	3–0
2	Social Corire	2	1	0	1	1	3	−2	3	Advance to Second stage	0–1	—	4–0
3	Juvenil Arequipa	2	0	0	2	0	7	−7	0		—	—	—

Source: Departamental de Arequipa – primera fase vuelta
Rules for classification: 1) points; 2) goal difference; 3) goals scored; 4) draw.

=== Second stage ===
Teams			Scores			
1st leg home team	Points	2nd leg home team	1st leg	2nd leg	Extra match	Pen.
Cerritos los Libres	4:1	Internacional Majes	2–0	3–3	–	–
Binacional	6:0	Unión Huacapuy	2–1	3–0	–	–
Deportivo Estrella	0:6	Los Chinitos de Atico	2–3	1–7	–	–
Social Corire	0:6	Sportivo Huracán	0–1	0–4	–	–

=== Final stage ===
Pos	Team	Pld	W	D	L	GF	GA	GD	Pts	Qualification	EMB	HUR	CLL	LCA
1	Binacional	6	6	0	0	17	5	+12	18	Advance to National stage	—	2–0	4–0	2–0
2	Sportivo Huracán	6	3	0	3	12	13	−1	9	Advance to National stage	2–3	—	2–0	4–1
3	Cerrito los Libres	6	1	1	4	5	12	−7	4		0–1	2–4	—	3–1
4	Los Chinitos de Atico	6	1	1	4	10	14	−4	4		3–5	5–0	0–0	—

Source: Departamental de Arequipa – fecha 6 cuadrangular
Rules for classification: 1) points; 2) goal difference; 3) goals scored; 4) draw.

== Liga Departamental de Ayacucho ==
First stage
Sport Huanta	5	8	13
Sport Manzanayooc	1	0	1
Sport Jananhuanca	0	1	1
Deportivo Municipal Los Morochucos	4	3	7
Los Audaces de Mayapo	2	1	3
Cultural Municipal	1	1	2
Juventud Ninabamba	1	0	1
San Pedro de Mosoccallpa	2	3	5
Sport Gallito de las Rocas	13	3	16
San Juan de Chito	0	0	0
Vista Alegre de Huamanga	4	2	6(4)
Ramón Castilla	2	4	6(5)
Social Huando	1	1	2
Real Coraspampa (a)	2	0	2
Juvenud de Las Venecias	0	1	1
Player Villafuerte	7	12	19

Quarterfinals
Sport Huanta	7	4	11
Deportivo Municipal Los Morochucos	1	1	2
Los Audaces de Mayapo	8	1	9
San Pedro de Mosocallpa	0	2	2
Sport Gallito de las Rocas	4	3	7
Ramón Castilla	1	2	3
Real Coraspampa	0	0	0
Player Villafuerte	4	1	5

Semifinals
Sport Huanta	7	1	8
Los Audaces de Mayapo	1	4	5
Sport Gallito de las Rocas	1	1	2
Player Villafuerte	1	2	3

Finals
Los Audaces de Mayapo	1	1	2
Player Villafuerte	1	0	1

== Liga Departamental de Cajamarca ==
First stage
Deportivo Zepita	w/o	w/o	6
Señor de los Milagros de San Pablo	—	—	0
Juvenil Pisit	1	1	2
Sport Contumazá	2	1	3
La Viña
bye
25 de Abril	1	2	3
Dos de Mayo de Cajabamba	3	4	7
Unión Juvenil	4	1	5
Deportivo Municipal (San Ignacio)	1	2	3
Padre Eterno de Celendín	3	2	5
Real JL	6	4	10
CD Carniche	9	1	10
Libertardor Frutillo	1	1	2
Defensor Tembladera	4	—	4
Atlético San Miguel	1	w/o	4
Unión San Ignacio	—	—	0
ADA	w/o	w/o	6
Anaximandro Vega	4	2	6
Defensor Cruceño	1	0	1
4 de Octubre	4	0	4
Los Inseparables	2	7	9
IST José Sabogal	2	0	2
Ramón Castilla	2	3	5
Unión Tongod
bye
San Nicolás	1	0	1
San Cayetano	0	2	2
Carlos Malpica	0	1	1
Las Palmas	4	0	4

Second stage
Deportivo Zepita	2	1	3(2)
Sport Contumazá	1	2	3(3)
La Viña	1	0	1
Dos de Mayo	5	5
Unión Juvenil	1	0	1
Real JL	0	5	5
CDC Carniche	1	-	1
Atlético San Miguel	1	w/o	4
ADA	2	1	3
Anaximandro Vega	1	1	2
Los Inseparables	6	1	7
Ramón Castilla	0	1	1
Unión Tongod
San Nicolás
San Cayetano	0	0	0
Las Palmas	0	2	2

Quarterfinals
Sport Contumazá	2	1	3
Dos de Mayo	1	4	5
Real JL	13	w/o	16
Atlético San Miguel	0	—	0
ADA (a)	4	1	5
Los Inseparables	0	5	5
Unión Tongod	4	0	4
Las Palmas	0	7	7

Semifinals
Dos de Mayo	4	2	6
Real JL	4	6	10
ADA	3	0	3
Las Palmas	0	3	3

Finals
Real JL
Las Palmas

== Liga Departamental del Callao ==
=== First stage ===
==== Group A ====
Pos	Team	Pld	W	D	L	GF	GA	GD	Pts	Qualification	SPC	DLL	UFC	DPF
1	Sport Callao	2	2	0	0	8	1	+7	6	Advance to Second stage	—	–	6–1	N.P.
2	Dan Las Lomas	2	1	0	1	5	3	+2	3		0–2	—	N.P.	5–0
3	Unión Fuerza Chalaca	2	1	0	1	3	6	−3	3		–	–	—	2–0
4	Deportivo Faucett	2	0	0	2	0	7	−7	0		–	–	–	—

Source: Departamental del Callao – fecha 4
Rules for classification: 1) points; 2) goal difference; 3) goals scored; 4) draw.

==== Group B ====
Pos	Team	Pld	W	D	L	GF	GA	GD	Pts	Qualification	AEB	AML	ADC	CDC	DPC
1	Asociación de Ex-alumnos Belenianos	3	3	0	0	10	0	+10	9	Advance to Second stage	—	1–0	1–0	–	8–0
2	América Latina	3	2	0	1	4	5	−1	6		–	—	0–2	2–1	2–1
3	ADC Callao	2	1	0	1	2	1	+1	3		–	–	—	N.P.	–
4	CD Conquistadores	1	0	0	1	1	2	−1	0		-	-	-	—	-
5	Deportivo Camiña	2	0	0	2	1	10	−9	0		-	-	-	N.P.	—

Source: Departamental del Callao – fecha 4
Rules for classification: 1) points; 2) goal difference; 3) goals scored; 4) draw.

==== Group C ====
Pos	Team	Pld	W	D	L	GF	GA	GD	Pts	Qualification	DPY	JLP	RSO	DYN	IUC
1	Deportivo Yurimaguas	4	4	0	0	14	1	+13	12	Advance to Second stage	—	-	1–0	3–1	5–1
2	Juventud La Perla	4	3	0	1	9	5	+4	9		0–3	—	2–0	-	3–0
3	Real Sociedad	2	0	0	2	0	3	−3	0		-	-	—	-	N.P.
4	Dynamo	2	0	0	2	2	9	−7	0		-	1–6	1–0	—	-
5	Independiente Unión Chalaca	2	0	0	2	1	8	−7	0		-	-	-	-	—

Source: Departamental del Callao – fecha 4
Rules for classification: 1) points; 2) goal difference; 3) goals scored; 4) draw.

==== Group D ====
Pos	Team	Pld	W	D	L	GF	GA	GD	Pts	Qualification	SJT	PNC	STP	KWR
1	San Judas Tadeo	3	2	1	0	4	1	+3	7	Advance to Second stage	—	1(3)-1(2)	0–0	-
2	Atlético Pilsen Callao	3	1	1	1	5	4	+1	4		-	—	3–2	-
3	Sentimiento Porteño	2	0	1	1	2	3	−1	1		-	-	—	-
4	Kiwi Reynoso	2	0	1	1	1	4	−3	1		0–3	1–1	N.P.	—

Source: Departamental del Callao – fecha 4
Rules for classification: 1) points; 2) goal difference; 3) goals scored; 4) draw.

=== Second stage ===
No final game was played. The team with the greatest goal difference during the semifinals was declared the Departmental champion.

Semifinals
Asociación de Ex-alumnos Belenianos	1
Sport Callao	3
Deportivo Yurimaguas	3
San Judas Tadeo	0

Final
Sport Callao	–
Deportivo Yurimaguas	–

== Liga Departamental de Cusco ==
=== First stage ===
==== Group A ====
===== Group 1 =====
Pos	Team	Pld	W	D	L	GF	GA	GD	Pts	Qualification	MST	CCH	AGA	SPS
1	Deportivo Municipal (Santo Tomás)	5	3	1	1	15	10	+5	10	Advance to Play off	—	0–0	3–3	5–1
2	Corazón Chequeño	5	3	1	1	8	9	−1	10	Advance to Play off	1–2	—	2–1	3–1
3	Agustín Gamarra (Anta)	6	2	2	2	5	5	0	8		2–0	1–1	—	1–0
4	Sport Sumer	2	2	0	0	6	10	−4	6		2–1	1–5	2–0	—

Source: Departamental del Cusco – fecha 6
Rules for classification: 1) points; 2) goal difference; 3) goals scored; 4) draw.

====== Play off ======
28 July 2017
14:30 PET

Deportivo Municipal (Santo Tomás)	0–1	Corazón Chequeño
	Report

Estadio Municipal José Santos Tamayo, Cusco

Corazón Chequeño advanced to the Second stage.

===== Group 2 =====
Pos	Team	Pld	W	D	L	GF	GA	GD	Pts	Qualification	MUQ	MOQ	MUC
1	Deportivo Municipal (Quillabamba)	4	3	0	1	8	4	+4	9	Advance to Second stage	—	4–1	2–0
2	Minero de Ocongate	4	2	1	1	8	6	+2	7		0–0	—	3–1 (4-1)
3	Deportivo Municipal (Coporaque)	4	0	1	3	1	7	−6	1		0–1	0–0	—

Source: Departamental del Cusco – fecha 6
Rules for classification: 1) points; 2) goal difference; 3) goals scored; 4) draw.

===== Group 3 =====
Pos	Team	Pld	W	D	L	GF	GA	GD	Pts	Qualification	AUA	RSN	UHE
1	Atlético Universidad Andina	4	3	1	0	11	0	+11	10	Advance to Second stage	—	3–1	3–1
2	Real Sociedad 9 de Noviembre	4	1	2	1	8	0	+8	5		2–2	—	1–1
3	Unión Herrera	4	0	1	3	3	0	+3	1		0–3	1–4	—

Source: Departamental del Cusco – fecha 6
Rules for classification: 1) points; 2) goal difference; 3) goals scored; 4) draw.

===== Group 4 =====
Pos	Team	Pld	W	D	L	GF	GA	GD	Pts	Qualification	UNP	RTN	DYN
1	Unión Pumacahuina	2	1	1	0	4	1	+3	4	Advance to Second stage	—	4–1	N.P.
2	Rico Tunga	2	0	1	1	1	4	−3	1		N.P.	—	0–0
3	Defensor Yanatile (W)	0	0	0	0	0	0	0	0		N.P.	N.P.	—

Source: Departamental del Cusco – fecha 6
Rules for classification: 1) points; 2) goal difference; 3) goals scored; 4) draw.
(W) Withdrew

==== Group B ====
===== Group 5 =====
Pos	Team	Pld	W	D	L	GF	GA	GD	Pts	Qualification	MAP	SCR	OLM	ATQ
1	Molloccahua Alto Pichigua	6	4	2	0	11	4	+7	14	Advance to Second stage	—	2–2	2–1	1–0
2	San Cristóbal de Rahuanqui	6	4	2	0	14	8	+6	14	Advance to Second stage	0–0	—	4–2	0–0
3	Olímpicos de Maska	6	1	1	4	8	15	−7	4		0–0	1–2	—	2–2
4	Atlético Quisini	6	0	1	5	5	11	−6	1		0–1	2–4	0–1	—

Source: Departamental del Cusco – fecha 6
Rules for classification: 1) points; 2) goal difference; 3) goals scored; 4) draw.

===== Group 6 =====
Pos	Team	Pld	W	D	L	GF	GA	GD	Pts	Qualification	HLC	SAL	AGR	UNI
1	Humberto Luna	6	4	2	0	12	3	+9	14	Advance to Second stage	—	3–0	2–0	2–2
2	Salesianos	6	3	2	1	12	7	+5	11		0–0	—	0–0	1–3
3	Agropecuario de Velille	6	1	2	3	3	8	−5	5		1–3	1–0	—	0–0
4	Universitario de Cusipata	6	0	2	4	3	12	−9	2		0–2	2–5	0–0	—

Source: Departamental del Cusco – fecha 6
Rules for classification: 1) points; 2) goal difference; 3) goals scored; 4) draw.

===== Group 7 =====
Pos	Team	Pld	W	D	L	GF	GA	GD	Pts	Qualification	DPG	MAN	INC	OCP
1	Deportivo Garcilaso	6	4	2	0	15	7	+8	14	Advance to Second stage	—	1–1	2–1	8–4
2	Manco II	6	2	3	1	7	5	+2	9		0–1	—	1–0	0–0
3	Ingeniería Civil	6	2	2	2	12	6	+6	8		1–1	2–2	—	5–0
4	Ormeño Ccollotaro	5	0	1	4	5	21	−16	1		0–2	1–3	0–3	—

Source: Departamental del Cusco – fecha 6
Rules for classification: 1) points; 2) goal difference; 3) goals scored; 4) draw.

===== Ranking of second placed teams =====
Pos	Grp	Team	Pld	W	D	L	GF	GA	GD	Pts	Qualification
1	5	San Cristóbal (Rahuanqui)	6	4	2	0	14	8	+6	14	Advance to Second stage
2	6	Salesianos	6	3	2	1	12	7	+5	11	
3	7	Manco II	6	2	3	1	7	3	+4	9	

Source: Departamental del Cusco – fecha 6
Rules for classification: 1) points; 2) goal difference; 3) goals scored; 4) draw.

=== Second stage ===
Quarterfinals
Molloccahua Alto Pichigua	0	1	1
Deportivo Garcilaso	1	2	3
Humberto Luna	5	1	6
San Cristóbal (Rahuanqui)	1	0	1
Unión Pumacahuina	4	2	6
Atlético Universidad Andina	7	1	8
Corazón Chequeño	3	1	4
Deportivo Municipal (Quillabamba)	0	5	5

Semifinals
Deportivo Garcilaso	4	1	5
Humberto Luna	2	1	3
Atlético Universidad Andina	2	0	2
Deportivo Municipal (Quillabamba)	0	3	3

Final
Deportivo Garcilaso	7
Deportivo Municipal (Quillabamba)	1

== Liga Departamental de Huancavelica ==
=== First stage ===
Team 1	Agg.	Team 2	1st leg	2nd leg
UDA	5–2	Deportivo Agronomía	3–0	2–2
FC Huayrapata	2–3	Diablos Rojos (HV)	1–0	1–3
Defensor Paucará	1–5	Sport Azafrán	1–2	0–3

FC Huayrapata advanced to the next stage as the round looser with the best record.

=== Second stage ===
Four teams from Huaytará Province and Castrovirreyna Province entered the tournament this round.

==== Group A ====
Pos	Team	Pld	W	D	L	GF	GA	GD	Pts	Qualification	DRH	FCH	UDA	SPA
1	Diablos Rojos (HV)	6	4	1	1	9	5	+4	13	Advance to Third stage	—	0–0	1–0	3–0
2	FC Huayrapata	6	2	3	1	7	7	0	9	Advance to Third stage	2–2	—	0–0	2–0
3	UDA	6	2	2	2	8	5	+3	8		1–2	4–0	—	2–1
4	Sport Azafrán	6	0	2	4	3	10	−7	2		0–1	1–1	0–0	—

Source: Departamental de Huancavelica – segunda fase fecha 6
Rules for classification: 1) points; 2) goal difference; 3) goals scored; 4) draw.

==== Group B ====
Team 1	Agg.	Team 2	1st leg	2nd leg
San José	3–6	[caraccocha FC	3–4	0–2
Sport Huascar Muchic	3–2	Yanarumi	3–0	0–2

=== Third stage ===
Semifinals
FC Huayrapata	1	2	3
Sport Huascar Muchic	2	0	2
Ccaraccocha FC	0	0	0
Diablos Rojos (HV)	3	10	13

Finals
FC Huayrapata	1	0	1
Diablos Rojos (HV)	2	5	7

== Liga Departamental de Huánuco ==
=== Preliminary stage ===
Both Alianza Universidad, who withdrew from the Peruvian Segunda División and León de Huánuco, relegated at the end of the 2015 Torneo Descentralizado, entered the tournament at this stage. A preliminary stage between these two teams and the champion and runner-up from Huánuco Province was played.

Team 1	Agg.	Team 2	1st leg	2nd leg
León de Huánuco	7-3	Miguel Grau UDH	3-2	4-1
Alianza Universidad	4-2	UNHEVAL	0-1	3-1

=== Bracket ===
First stage
Sport La Punta	3	0	3
AD Tashga	1	0	1
Sport Nacional	6	0	6
Cencur	0	3	3
Sporting Cristal (Kutipuquio)	1	0	1
Social Molino	2	2	4
Racing 2000	0	1	1
León de Huánuco	3	4	7
ISTPAHT	1	0	1
Unión Cayumba	0	3	3
UNAS	4	0	4
CS Huamaliano	0	0	0
Tres de Mayo (Chacos)	0	0	0
Alianza Universidad	1	4	5
Vanguardia Juvenil	1	1	2
Santa Lucía	1	3	4

Second stage
Sport La Punta	5	2	7
Sport Nacional	1	3	4
Social Molino	0	1	1
León de Huánuco	2	1	3
Unión Cayumba	0	2	2
UNAS	1	1	2
Alianza Universidad	6	1	7
Santa Lucía	1	2	3

Semifinals
Sport La Punta	1	2	3
León de Huánuco	1	2	3
Unión Cayumba	0	0	0
Alianza Universidad	1	0	1

Final
León de Huánuco	1	2	3
Alianza Universidad	3	1	4

Sport La Punta did was not register properly and thus Leon de Huánuco was given the slot in the final.

== Liga Departamental de Ica ==
=== First stage ===
Team 1	Agg.	Team 2	1st leg	2nd leg
Juventud Balconcito	1-0	Carlos Orellana	0-0	1-0
Domingo Ayarza	2-1	Independiente Cantayo	1-0	1-1
Los Libertadores	3-3	Juventud Progresista (a)	3-1	0-2
Defensor Zarumilla	3-1	Juventud Barrio Nuevo	2-1	1-0
Deportivo América	0-6	Unión San Martín	0-1	0-5
18 de Febrero	0-1	Parada de Amigos	0-0	0-1

Independiente Cantayo and Los Libertadores moved on to the next stage as losers with the best record.

=== Second stage ===
Quarterfinals
Parada de los Amigos	2	2	4
Juventud Balconcito	1	0	1
Los Libertadores	1	1	2
Independiente Cantayo	0	1	1
Domingo Ayarza	3	0	3
Unión San Martín	2	2	4
Defensor Zarumilla	5	3	8
Juventud Progresista	2	0	2

Semifinals
Parada de los Amigos	3	2	5
Los Libertadores	3	0	3
Unión San Martín (p)	0	0	0(4)
Defensor Zarumilla	0	0	0(2)

Finals
Parada de los Amigos	2
Unión San Martín	3

== Liga Departamental de Junín ==
=== First stage ===
Pos	Team	Pld	W	D	L	GF	GA	GD	Pts	Qualification
1	Sport La Vid	2	2	0	0	8	1	+7	6	Advance to Second stage
2	ADT	2	1	1	0	7	0	+7	4	Advance to Second stage
3	Selva Central	2	1	1	0	8	2	+6	4	Advance to Second stage
4	Deportivo Municipal (Yanamuclo)	2	1	1	0	4	2	+2	4	Advance to Second stage
5	Sport San Cristóbal	2	1	1	0	3	1	+2	4	Advance to Second stage
6	Academia Municipal	2	1	1	0	5	4	+1	4	Advance to Second stage
7	ACD Triyunix	2	1	1	0	5	4	+1	4	Advance to Second stage
8	Escuela JTR	2	1	1	0	3	2	+1	4	Advance to Second stage
9	Santa Rosa PNP	2	1	1	0	2	1	+1	4	Advance to Second stage
10	Alipio Ponce	2	1	0	1	4	3	+1	3	Advance to Second stage
11	Unión Pichanaki	2	1	0	1	3	4	−1	3	Advance to Second stage
12	Sport Andino	2	0	1	1	5	4	+1	1	Advance to Second stage
13	Mariano Melgar (SRS)	2	0	1	1	4	5	−1	1	
14	Unión Pucará	2	0	1	1	2	3	−1	1	Advance to Second stage
15	Independiente Estudiantil	2	0	1	1	1	2	−1	1	Advance to Second stage
16	Deportivo Municipal (Huayre)	2	0	1	1	2	4	−2	1	
17	Echa Muni	2	0	1	1	1	3	−2	1	
18	Sport Camantaro	2	0	1	1	2	8	−6	1	
19	AD Texas	2	0	1	1	0	7	−7	1	
20	CD Regatas	2	0	0	2	1	8	−7	0	

Updated to match(es) played on completed. Source:
Rules for classification: 1) points; 2) goal difference; 3) goals scored; 4) draw.

==== Results ====
Team 1	Agg.	Team 2	1st leg	2nd leg
Escuela JTR	3–2	Unión Pucará	2–1	1–1
Mariano Melgar (SRS)	4–5	ACD Triyunix	2–2	2–3
ADT	7–0	AD Texas	7–0	0–0
Echa Muni	1–3	Sport San Cristóbal	1–1	0–2
Academia Municipal	5–4	Sport Andino	2–2	3–2
Santa Rosa PNP	2–1	Independiente Estudiantil	1–0	1–1
Sport La Vid	8–1	CD Regatas	4–1	4–0
Deportivo Municipal (Huayre)	2–4	Deportivo Municipal (Yanamuclo)	1–1	1–3
Alipio Ponce	4–3	Unión Pichanaki	4–1	0–2
Selva Central	8–2	Sport Camantaro	6–0	2–2

=== Second stage ===
Pos	Team	Pld	W	D	L	GF	GA	GD	Pts	Qualification
1	Alipio Ponce	2	0	1	1	0	2	−2	1	Advance to the Group stage
2	ADT	2	2	0	0	5	1	+4	6	Advance to the Group stage
3	Unión Pichanaki	2	0	1	1	2	5	−3	1	Advance to the Group stage
4	Sport La Vid	2	2	0	0	8	3	+5	6	Advance to the Group stage
5	Santa Rosa PNP	2	0	2	0	4	4	0	2	Advance to the Group stage
6	Sport Andino	2	0	1	1	1	5	−4	1	Advance to the Group stage
7	Selva Central	2	1	1	0	5	1	+4	4	Advance to the Group stage
8	ACD Triyunix	2	1	0	1	4	4	0	3	Advance to Play-off stage
9	Escuela JTR	2	0	2	0	4	4	0	2	Advance to Play-off stage
10	Academia Municipal	2	1	0	1	4	4	0	3	
11	Independiente Estudiantil	2	0	0	2	3	8	−5	0	
12	Deportivo Municipal (Yanamuclo)	2	1	1	0	5	2	+3	4	
13	Unión Pucará	2	0	0	2	1	5	−4	0	
14	Sport San Cristóbal	2	1	1	0	2	0	+2	4	

Updated to match(es) played on completed. Source:
Rules for classification: 1) points; 2) goal difference; 3) goals scored; 4) draw.

==== Results ====
Team 1	Agg.	Team 2	1st leg	2nd leg
Sport La Vid	5–2	Independiente Estudiantil	4–1	1–1
ADT	5–1	Unión Pucará	3–0	2–1
Sport Andino	4–4	Selva Central	2–1	2–3
ACD Triyunix	4–5	Escuela JTR	2–2	2–3
Unión Pichanaki	5–1	Deportivo Municipal (Yanamuclo)	4–0	1–1
Alipio Ponce	8–3	Sport San Cristóbal	4–1	4–2
Academia Municipal	0–2	Santa Rosa PNP	0–0	0–2

===== Play-off =====
21 July 2017
10:00

Escuela JTR	1–0	ACD Triyunix

Estadio Vista Alegre, San Jerónimo de Tunán

Escuela de Fútbol JTR advanced to the Group stage.

=== Group stage ===
==== Group A ====
Pos	Team	Pld	W	D	L	GF	GA	GD	Pts	Qualification	SLC	SLV	ALP	UNP
1	Selva Central	6	2	4	0	4	2	+2	10	Advance to National stage	—	2–2	1–0	0–0
2	Sport La Vid	6	2	3	1	6	4	+2	9		0–0	—	2–1	2–0
3	Alipio Ponce	6	2	2	2	7	4	+3	8		0–0	0–0	—	3–0
4	Unión Pichanaki	6	1	1	4	2	9	−7	4		0–1	1–0	1–3	—

Source: Departamental de Junín – fecha 6 grupos
Rules for classification: 1) points; 2) goal difference; 3) goals scored; 4) draw.

==== Group B ====
Pos	Team	Pld	W	D	L	GF	GA	GD	Pts	Qualification	ADT	PNP	JTR	SPA
1	ADT	6	5	0	1	16	3	+13	15	Advance to National stage	—	2–1	3–0	5–0
2	Santa Rosa PNP	6	3	1	2	11	5	+6	10		2–1	—	0–1	4–0
3	Escuela JTR	6	3	0	3	7	11	−4	9		0–2	2–3	—	4–2
4	Sport Andino	6	0	1	5	2	17	−15	1		0–3 (Note: The Justice Court of the tournament organizer, Liga Departamental de Futbol de Junín, awarded Asociación Deportiva Tarma a 3–0 win as a result of Sport Andino fielding players that were not correctly enrolled in the tournament.)	0–0	0–1	—

Source: Departamental de Junín – fecha 6 grupos
Rules for classification: 1) points; 2) goal difference; 3) goals scored; 4) draw.

== Liga Departamental de La Libertad ==
=== First stage ===
The teams were divided into five groups. Three from the Coastal Zone of the region from which the three group winners and best runner-up qualified to the next stage. The other two groups are from the Andean Zone of the region from which the best two team of each group advanced to the next stage.

==== Coastal Zone ====
===== Group A =====
Pos	Team	Pld	W	D	L	GF	GA	GD	Pts	Qualification	AUC	DVP	MRS	SNG
1	Alfonso Ugarte de Chiclín	6	4	1	1	25	5	+20	13	Advance to Second stage	—	2–1	0–0	8–1
2	Defensor Verdún	6	4	1	1	15	2	+13	13		1–0	—	0–0	8–0
3	Mariscal Sucre (Chepén)	6	2	2	2	13	6	+7	8		1–1	0–1	—	5–1
4	San Gabriel	6	0	0	6	3	43	−40	0		1–11	0–0	0–6	—

Rules for classification: 1) points; 2) goal difference; 3) goals scored; 4) draw.

===== Group B =====
Pos	Team	Pld	W	D	L	GF	GA	GD	Pts	Qualification	DFT	MFC	DFC	SPT
1	Defensor Tanguche	6	4	0	2	9	6	+3	12	Advance to Play-off	—	0–1	1–2	2–1
2	Municipal FC	6	4	0	2	9	6	+3	12	Advance to Play-off	0–0	—	0–1	1–0
3	Defensor Calera	6	3	0	3	9	8	+1	9		1–2	1–2	—	0–0
4	Sporting Tabaco (Ascope)	6	1	0	5	7	14	−7	3		1–2	2–5	2–0	—

Rules for classification: 1) points; 2) goal difference; 3) goals scored; 4) draw.

====== Play-off ======
26 July 2017
15:00

Defensor Tanguche	1–1	Municipal FC
Penalties
	4–3

Estadio Cooperativo, Cartavio

===== Group C =====
Pos	Team	Pld	W	D	L	GF	GA	GD	Pts	Qualification	INC	AGG	BTC	FCV
1	El Inca	6	4	1	1	20	6	+14	13	Advance to Second stage	—	1–2	3–1	0–0
2	Augusto Gildemeister	6	4	0	2	12	7	+5	12		1–2	—	3–2	3–0
3	Best Cable de Chepén	6	2	1	3	7	9	−2	7		1–1	0–0	—	2–1
4	FC Vasko UBA	6	1	0	5	4	21	−17	3		1–8	1–3	1–0	—

Rules for classification: 1) points; 2) goal difference; 3) goals scored; 4) draw.

===== Ranking of second placed teams =====
Pos	Grp	Team	Pld	W	D	L	GF	GA	GD	Pts	Qualification
1	A	Defensor Verdún	6	4	1	1	25	5	+20	13	Advance to Second stage
2	C	Best Cable de Chepén	6	4	0	2	12	7	+5	12	
3	B	Municipal FC	6	4	0	2	9	6	+3	12	

Rules for classification: 1) points; 2) goal difference; 3) goals scored; 4) draw.

==== Andean Zone ====
===== Group A =====
Pos	Team	Pld	W	D	L	GF	GA	GD	Pts	Qualification	MGG	STR	SMB	DPL
1	Miguel Grau (Huamachuco)	5	4	0	1	13	3	+10	12	Advance to Second stage	—	0–0	4–0	W.O.
2	Santa Rosa (Santiago de Chuco)	5	4	0	1	14	9	+5	12	Advance to Second stage	1–4	—	0–0	W.O.
3	Simón Bolívar (Otuzco)	5	2	0	3	8	10	−2	6		1–0	3–4	—	0–0
4	Deportivo Libertad	5	0	0	5	2	15	−13	0		0–0	1–4	0–3	—

Rules for classification: 1) points; 2) goal difference; 3) goals scored; 4) draw.

===== Group B =====
Pos	Team	Pld	W	D	L	GF	GA	GD	Pts	Qualification	RMC	CCS	IND	NJV
1	Ramón Castilla (Otuzco)	5	2	3	0	5	1	+4	9	Advance to Second stage	—	0–0	1–1	2–0
2	Ciclón Santiaguino	5	1	4	0	6	2	+4	7	Advance to Second stage	0–0	—	0–0	5–1
3	Independiente de Chungay	5	1	2	2	8	7	+1	5		0–2	1–1	—	6–2
4	Nueva Juventud	5	1	1	3	4	13	−9	4		0–0	0–0	0–0	—

Rules for classification: 1) points; 2) goal difference; 3) goals scored; 4) draw.

=== Second stage ===
==== Costal Zone ====
Team 1	Agg.	Team 2	1st leg	2nd leg
Defensor Verdún	2–3	El Inca	2–3	0–0
Defensor Tanguche	2–3	Alfonso Ugarte de Chiclín	2–2	0–1

==== Andean Zone ====
Team 1	Agg.	Team 2	1st leg	2nd leg
Santa Rosa (Santiago de Chuco)	2(1)–2(3)	Ramón Castilla (Otuzco)	2–0	0–2
Ciclón Santiaguino	1–4	Miguel Grau (Huamachuco)	0–3	1–1

=== Final group stage ===
Pos	Team	Pld	W	D	L	GF	GA	GD	Pts	Qualification	INC	AUC	RMC	CCS
1	El Inca	3	2	0	1	5	3	+2	6	Advance to National stage	—	–	–	2–0
2	Alfonso Ugarte de Chiclín	3	1	1	1	5	4	+1	4	Advance to National stage	1–2	—	3–1	–
3	Ramón Castilla de Otuzco	3	1	1	1	3	4	−1	4		2–1	–	—	0–0
4	Ciclón Santiaguino	3	0	2	1	1	3	−2	2		–	1–1	–	—

Rules for classification: 1) points; 2) goal difference; 3) goals scored; 4) draw.

== Liga Departamental de Lambayeque ==
=== First stage ===
==== Group A ====
Pos	Team	Pld	W	D	L	GF	GA	GD	Pts	Qualification	JAC	ASJ	JSA	VDG	CSC
1	Juan Aurich (Chongoyape)	4	3	0	1	6	3	+3	9	Advance to Second stage	—	0–3	–	4–0	–
2	Academia San Juan	4	2	1	1	9	7	+2	7	Advance to Second stage	–	—	1–4	4–2	–
3	Juventud San Alberto	4	2	0	2	9	4	+5	6		0–1	–	—	–	4–0
4	Vasco de Gama	4	2	0	2	13	10	+3	6		–	–	2–1	—	9–1
5	Manuel Casimiro Chumán	4	0	1	3	2	15	−13	1		0–1	1–1	–	–	—

Rules for classification: 1) points; 2) goal difference; 3) goals scored; 4) draw.

==== Group B ====
Pos	Team	Pld	W	D	L	GF	GA	GD	Pts	Qualification	JAB	CAR	SPG	AJE	USA
1	Juan Aurich (Batangrande)	4	4	0	0	13	2	+11	12	Advance to Second stage	—	1–0	–	3–1	–
2	Carlos Stein	4	2	1	1	10	4	+6	7	Advance to Second stage	–	—	2–2	–	6–1
3	Sport Grifo	4	1	1	2	5	8	−3	4		1–3	–	—	1–3	–
4	AJEC	3	1	0	2	4	6	−2	3		–	0–2	–	—	N.P.
5	Unión San Agustín	3	0	0	3	1	13	−12	0		0–6	–	0–1	–	—

Rules for classification: 1) points; 2) goal difference; 3) goals scored; 4) draw.

=== Second stage ===
Semifinals
Carlos Stein	3	2	5
Juan Aurich (Chongoyape)	0	2	2
Academia San Juan	1	0	1
Juan Aurich (Chongoyape)	0	5	5

Finals
Carlos Stein (pen.)
Juan Aurich (Chongoyape)

== Liga Departamental de Lima ==
=== First stage ===
Team 1	Agg.	Team 2	1st leg	2nd leg
Defensor Laure Sur	2–0	Juventud Huaripache	1–0	1–0
Alianza Pizarro	2–1	Defensor San Nicolás	1–1	0–1
Unión Santa Rosa	1–7	ADI Mamahuarmy	1–3	0–4
Social La Villa	4–1	Santo Domingo de Laraos	3–0	1–1
Flamengo	2–4	San Lorenzo de Porococha	1–3	1–1
Deportivo El Potao	6–2	Juventud 2001 Chancayllo	2–1	4–1
Juventud América	2–2 (a)	Somos Olímpico	1–0	1–2
Venus	3–3 (a)	Juventud Barranco	1–1	2–2
Independiente	3–1	Los Ángeles Negros	1–0	2–1

Atlético Juvenil Huaripache, Alianza Pizarro, Santo Domingo, Flamengo FBC, Somos Olímpico, Juventud Barranco, and Los Ángeles Negros move on to the next round as best runners-up.

=== Second stage ===
First round
1	San Lorenzo de Porococha	3	4	7
16	Alianza Pizarro	1	5	6
8	Juventud Barranco	2	2	4
9	Deportivo El Potao	1	1	2
5	Defensor San Nicolás	2	2	4
12	Los Ángeles Negros	0	2	2
4	Defensor Laure Sur	3	2	5
13	Juventud Huaripache	1	2	3
6	Social La Villa	2	2	4
11	Santo Domingo de Laraos	2	3	5
3	ADI Mamahuarmy	4	2	6
14	Flamengo	0	0	0
7	Juventud América	0	0	0 (2)
10	Somos Olímpico (p)	0	0	0 (4)
2	Venus	2	0	2
15	Independiente (a)	2	0	2

Quarter-finals
San Lorenzo de Porococha	0	1	1
Juventud Barranco	0	2	2
Defensor San Nicolás	1	1	2
Defensor Laure Sur	0	3	3
Santo Domingo de Laraos	1	1	2
ADI Mamahuarmy	0	0	0
Somos Olímpico	5	1	6
Independiente	0	2	2

Semi-finals
Juventud Barranco	0	1	1
Defensor Laure Sur	4	4	8
Santo Domingo de Laraos	0	0	0
Somos Olímpico	1	3	4

Final
Defensor Laure Sur (p)	0 (4)
Somos Olímpico	0 (3)

== Liga Departamental de Loreto ==
=== First stage ===
The tournament had two host cities. Nauta and Caballococha which hosted 2 groups of each.

==== Nauta ====
===== Group A =====
Pos	Team	Pld	W	D	L	GF	GA	GD	Pts	Qualification	HFC	CNI	UNI	MUN
1	Hércules FC	3	2	1	0	8	3	+5	7	Advance to Play-off	—	2–2	3–1	W.O.
2	Estudiantil CNI	3	2	1	0	7	2	+5	7	Advance to Play-off	–	—	2–0	W.O.
3	UNAP (Datem del Marañón)	2	0	0	2	1	5	−4	0		–	–	—	–
4	Deportivo Municipal (Santa Cruz)	2	0	0	2	0	6	−6	0		–	–	–	—

Rules for classification: 1) points; 2) goal difference; 3) goals scored; 4) draw.

===== Group B =====
Pos	Team	Pld	W	D	L	GF	GA	GD	Pts	Qualification	CEM	KSM	DPS	ZOO
1	Cultural El Milagro	3	2	1	0	6	1	+5	7	Advance to Play-off	—	1–1	1–0	5–1
2	Kola San Martín	3	2	1	0	5	1	+4	7	Advance to Play-off	–	—	3–0	2–1
3	Deportivo Salud	2	0	0	2	0	4	−4	0		–	–	—	N.P.
4	UNAP Zootecnia	2	0	0	2	2	7	−5	0		–	–	–	—

Rules for classification: 1) points; 2) goal difference; 3) goals scored; 4) draw.

==== Caballocochas ====
===== Group A =====
Pos	Team	Pld	W	D	L	GF	GA	GD	Pts	Qualification	AJB	ATS	MOT	VAL
1	Angamos Juventud Bellavista	3	3	0	0	9	4	+5	9	Advance to Final stage	—	4–3	–	–
2	Atlético Shebonal	3	1	1	1	10	8	+2	4		–	—	–	–
3	Mototaxistas	2	0	1	1	5	6	−1	1		1–2	4–4	—	–
4	Valentín de Uriarte	2	0	0	2	0	6	−6	0		W.O.	W.O.	–	—

Rules for classification: 1) points; 2) goal difference; 3) goals scored; 4) draw.

===== Group B =====
Pos	Team	Pld	W	D	L	GF	GA	GD	Pts	Qualification	UNI	DEP	DSP
1	UNAP (Ucayali)	2	1	1	0	3	0	+3	4	Advance to Play-off	—	–	3–0
2	Deportivo Iquiteña	2	1	1	0	2	1	+1	4	Advance to Play-off	0–0	—	2–1
3	Deportivo San Pablo	2	0	0	2	1	5	−4	0		–	–	—

Rules for classification: 1) points; 2) goal difference; 3) goals scored; 4) draw.

==== Extra matches ====
1 August 2017	Estudiantil CNI	3–0	Hércules FC	Estadio Max Augustín, Iquitos
20:00

1 August 2017	Kola San Martín	6–2	Cultural El Milagro	Estadio Max Augustín, Iquitos
18:00

31 July 2017	Deportivo Iquiteña	5–3	UNAP (Ucayali)	Estadio Municipal Campeones del 99, Caballococha
15:00

=== Final stage ===
Pos	Team	Pld	W	D	L	GF	GA	GD	Pts	Qualification	CNI	AJB	DEP	KSM
1	Estudiantil CNI	3	2	1	0	4	2	+2	7	Advance to National stage	—	2–2	1–0	1–0
2	Angamos Juventud Bellavista	3	1	2	0	7	4	+3	5	Advance to National stage	–	—	3–0	–
3	Deportivo Iquiteña	3	1	0	2	3	6	−3	3		–	–	—	–
4	Kola San Martín	3	0	1	2	4	6	−2	1		–	2–2	2–3	—

Rules for classification: 1) points; 2) goal difference; 3) goals scored; 4) draw.

== Liga Departamental de Madre de Dios ==
=== First stage ===
==== Group A ====
Pos	Team	Pld	W	D	L	GF	GA	GD	Pts	Qualification	MAL	MON	DEF
1	Deportivo Maldonado	4	4	0	0	14	4	+10	12	Advance to Final	—	3–2	W.O.
2	Deportivo Monterrico	4	2	0	2	14	7	+7	6		0–2	—	5–2
3	Defensor Iñapari	4	0	0	4	4	21	−17	0		2–6	0–7	—

Rules for classification: 1) points; 2) goal difference; 3) goals scored; 4) draw.

==== Group B ====
Pos	Team	Pld	W	D	L	GF	GA	GD	Pts	Qualification	MIN	MAF	JUV
1	MINSA	4	3	0	1	18	6	+12	9	Advance to Final	—	2–1	5–2
2	Mafer de Manu	4	2	0	2	6	14	−8	6		0–10	—	2–1
3	Juventus 12 de Enero	3	0	0	3	6	10	−4	0		2–1	1–2	—

Rules for classification: 1) points; 2) goal difference; 3) goals scored; 4) draw.

=== Final ===
13 August 2017
15:00

Deportivo Maldonado	4–2	MINSA

Estadio IPD de Puerto Maldonado, Puerto Maldonado

Both Deportivo Maldonado and Minsa FBC qualified to the 2017 Copa Perú National stage.

== Liga Departamental de Moquegua ==
AEXA Santa Cruz from General Sánchez Cerro Province was given a bye to the Second-place play-off.

=== First stage ===
==== Group A ====
Pos	Team	Pld	W	D	L	GF	GA	GD	Pts	Qualification	SNC	HUR	MRN	ADU
1	Credicoop San Cristóbal	4	2	2	0	7	3	+4	8	Advance to National stage	—	–	2–2	2–0
2	Atlético Huracán	4	2	0	2	8	5	+3	6	Advance to Second-place play-off	–	—	3–0	3–1
3	Mariscal Nieto	4	1	2	1	5	7	−2	5		1–1	2–1	—	–
4	ADUCI de Pacocha	4	1	0	3	3	8	−5	3		0–2	2–1	–	—

Rules for classification: 1) points; 2) goal difference; 3) goals scored; 4) draw.

=== Second-place play-off ===
Team 1	Agg.	Team 2	1st leg	2nd leg
Atlético Huracán	4–1	AEXA Santa Cruz	4–0	0–1

Atlético Huracán qualified as Departamental runner-up to the 2017 Copa Perú National stage.

== Liga Departamental de Pasco ==
=== First stage ===
Team 1	Agg.	Team 2	1st leg	2nd leg
Millenium	4–2	Comerciantes	3–1	1–1
Deportivo Municipal (Yanahuanca)	5–1	San Juan de Yanacocha	2–1	3–0
Social Constitución	3–3	Alipio Ponce	3–1	0–2

Social Constitución moved on to the next round as best runner-up.

=== Second stage ===
Semifinals
Social Constitución	1	0	1
Deportivo Municipal (Yanahuanca)	0	3	3
Alipio Ponce (a)	1	1	2
Millenium	0	2	2

Finals
Deportivo Municipal (Yanahuanca) (p)	1 (4)
Alipio Ponce	1 (2)

== Liga Departamental de Piura ==
=== Group stage ===
==== Group A ====
Pos	Team	Pld	W	D	L	GF	GA	GD	Pts	Qualification	UDP	J&V	TOR	LMT
1	UDP	6	4	1	1	11	5	+6	13	Advance to National stage	—	1–0	3–1	2–0
2	Juana & Víctor	6	3	0	3	10	10	0	9	Advance to Tie Breaker	2–1	—	3–2	3–1
3	Atlético Torino	6	3	0	3	9	9	0	9	Advance to Tie Breaker	0–2	2–0	—	2–0
4	Lizardo Montero	6	1	1	4	13	13	0	4		2–2	3–2	1–2	—

Rules for classification: 1) points; 2) goal difference; 3) goals scored; 4) draw.

===== Tie Breaker =====
2 August 2017
15:30

Atlético Torino	1–1	Juana & Víctor

Estadio Municipal de La Unión, Piura

==== Group B ====
Pos	Team	Pld	W	D	L	GF	GA	GD	Pts	Qualification	CAG	SPE	ALV	SRO
1	Atlético Grau	6	5	0	1	27	0	+27	15	Advance to National stage	—	3–0	6–0	10–1
2	Sport Estrella	6	4	1	1	15	0	+15	13	Advance to National stage	2–1	—	6–2	5–0
3	Alianza Villanueva	5	1	1	3	4	0	+4	4		0–2	0–0	—	2–1
4	Sport Rosario (M)	5	0	0	5	3	0	+3	0		0–5	1–2	N.P.	—

Rules for classification: 1) points; 2) goal difference; 3) goals scored; 4) draw.

==== Group C ====
Pos	Team	Pld	W	D	L	GF	GA	GD	Pts	Qualification	ATO	SPC	ARE	IND
1	Asociación Torino	6	5	1	0	12	0	+12	16	Advance to National stage	—	1–0	6–0	1–0
2	Sport Chorrillos de Querecotillo	6	4	1	1	12	3	+9	13	Advance to National stage	0–0	—	3–1	W.O.
3	Academia Real Estudiantil	5	1	0	4	5	14	−9	3		0–2	1–3	—	W.O.
4	Independiente (T)	5	0	0	5	0	12	−12	0		0–2	0–3	N.P.	—

Rules for classification: 1) points; 2) goal difference; 3) goals scored; 4) draw.

==== Group D ====
Pos	Team	Pld	W	D	L	GF	GA	GD	Pts	Qualification	UNP	ING	JVC	SJO
1	UNP	6	4	1	1	18	5	+13	13	Advance to National stage	—	5–2	1–1	W.O.
2	Sport Ingenio	6	3	1	2	9	12	−3	10	Advance to National stage	1–6	—	1–0	2–1
3	Juventud Cautivo	6	2	3	1	7	4	+3	9		1–0	0–0	—	3–0
4	San José de Paita	6	0	1	5	3	16	−13	1		0–3	W.O.	2–2	—

Rules for classification: 1) points; 2) goal difference; 3) goals scored; 4) draw.

==== Group E ====
Pos	Team	Pld	W	D	L	GF	GA	GD	Pts	Qualification	MON	SNM	SNA
1	Deportivo Monteverde	3	2	1	0	5	1	+4	7	Advance to Second stage	—	3–1	0–0
2	San Martín de Sullana	4	2	0	2	3	5	−2	6	Advance to Second stage	0–2	—	1–0
3	San Antonio	3	0	1	2	0	2	−2	1		N.P.	0–1	—

=== Second stage ===
Team 1	Agg.	Team 2	1st leg	2nd leg
Sport Chorrillos de Querecotillo	(3) 4–4 (4)	UDP (p)	3–1	1–3
Sport Ingenio	3–4	Atlético Grau	2–2	1–2
UNP	1–2	Atlético Torino	1–1	0–1
San Martín de Sullana	1–3	Asociación Torino	0–3	1–0
Sport Estrella	0–2	Deportivo Monteverde	0–0	0–2

Sport Chorrillos, Sport Ingenio, and San Martín (S) moved on to the next round as best runners-up.

=== Third stage ===
Quarterfinals
Atlético Grau	2	–	2
Sport Chorrillos de Querecotillo	0	–	0
Sport Ingenio	0	0	0
Atlético Torino	1	4	5
UDP	4	0	4
Deportivo Monteverde	0	1	1
San Martín de Sullana	1	0	1
Asociación Torino	2	5	7

Semifinals
Atlético Grau
Atlético Torino
UDP	1	0	1
Asociación Torino	0	5	5

Finals
Atlético Grau	w/o
Asociación Torino	–

== Liga Departamental de Puno ==
=== First group stage ===
==== Group A ====
Pos	Team	Pld	W	D	L	GF	GA	GD	Pts	Qualification	EST	PRG	ALP
1	Estudiantes Puno	4	3	1	0	20	3	+17	10	Advance to Second stage	—	8–0	10–2
2	Pedro Ruiz Gallo	4	2	1	1	7	11	−4	7		1–1	—	2–0
3	Alianza Porvenir	4	0	0	4	4	17	−13	0		0–1	2–4	—

Rules for classification: 1) points; 2) goal difference; 3) goals scored; 4) draw.

==== Group B ====
Pos	Team	Pld	W	D	L	GF	GA	GD	Pts	Qualification	AU	RMF	ALT
1	Alfonso Ugarte	4	4	0	0	18	0	+18	12	Advance to Second stage	—	6–0	5–0
2	Real Miraflores	4	1	1	2	5	12	−7	4		0–3	—	2–2
3	Alianza Thiri	4	0	1	3	3	14	−11	1		0–4	1–3	—

Rules for classification: 1) points; 2) goal difference; 3) goals scored; 4) draw.

==== Group C ====
Pos	Team	Pld	W	D	L	GF	GA	GD	Pts	Qualification	SPC	UDE	DFR
1	Sport Collao	4	2	2	0	9	2	+7	8	Advance to Play-off	—	5–0	1–1
2	UDE Los Próceres	4	2	2	0	6	3	+3	8	Advance to Play-off	0–0	—	3–1
3	Defensor Rosaspata	4	0	0	4	3	13	−10	0		1–3	1–2	—

Rules for classification: 1) points; 2) goal difference; 3) goals scored; 4) draw.

===== Play-off =====
14 July 2017
14:00

Sport Collao	2–2	UDE Los Próceres
Penalties
	1–3

Estadio E. Torres Belón, Puno

==== Group D ====
Pos	Team	Pld	W	D	L	GF	GA	GD	Pts	Qualification	SPM	PER	EMU
1	Sport Munich	4	2	1	1	6	4	+2	7	Advance to Second stage	—	2–1	3–0
2	Perusia FBC	4	2	0	2	7	5	+2	6		2–0	—	3–1
3	Escuela Municipal	3	0	1	2	4	8	−4	1		1–1	2–1	—

Rules for classification: 1) points; 2) goal difference; 3) goals scored; 4) draw.

==== Group E ====
Pos	Team	Pld	W	D	L	GF	GA	GD	Pts	Qualification	CSR	DFH	JVJ
1	Credicoop San Román	4	4	0	0	25	1	+24	12	Advance to Second stage	—	6–1	6–0
2	Defensor Huancané	4	1	0	3	5	22	−17	3		0–12	—	3–2
3	Juventus Junior	3	0	0	3	4	11	−7	0		0–1	2–1	—

Rules for classification: 1) points; 2) goal difference; 3) goals scored; 4) draw.

==== Group F ====
Pos	Team	Pld	W	D	L	GF	GA	GD	Pts	Qualification	ADE	MDM	DRT
1	AD Vilquechico	5	2	1	2	5	3	+2	7	Advance to Second stage	—	1–1	2–1
2	Deportivo Municipal (Moho)	3	2	0	1	15	5	+10	6		1–2	—	6–0
3	Defensor Rico Tacna	2	0	1	1	3	12	−9	1		0–0	2–4	—

Rules for classification: 1) points; 2) goal difference; 3) goals scored; 4) draw.

==== Group G ====
Pos	Team	Pld	W	D	L	GF	GA	GD	Pts	Qualification	SIE	DPA	MUN
1	SIEN Carabaya	4	2	1	1	16	3	+13	7	Advance to Second stage	—	7–0	8–1
2	Deportivo Ananea	4	2	0	2	5	10	−5	6		1–0	—	4–2
3	Deportivo Municipal (Yanahuaya)	3	0	1	2	5	13	−8	1		1–1	1–0	—

Rules for classification: 1) points; 2) goal difference; 3) goals scored; 4) draw.

==== Group H ====
Pos	Team	Pld	W	D	L	GF	GA	GD	Pts	Qualification	UFM	FUM	DFS
1	Fuerza Minera	4	3	1	0	7	2	+5	10	Advance to Second stage	—	2–1	3–0
2	Fuerza Unión Minera	4	1	2	1	4	4	0	5		1–1	—	1–0
3	Defensor Sandia	4	0	1	3	1	6	−5	1		0–1	1–1	—

Rules for classification: 1) points; 2) goal difference; 3) goals scored; 4) draw.

=== Second group stage ===
==== Group A ====
Pos	Team	Pld	W	D	L	GF	GA	GD	Pts	Qualification	AU	EST	UDE	SPM
1	Alfonso Ugarte	6	6	0	0	15	1	+14	18	Advance to National stage	—	2–0	5–0	3–0
2	Estudiantes Puno	6	3	1	2	8	10	−2	10	Advance to National stage	1–2	—	1–2	1–0
3	UDE Los Próceres	6	2	0	4	8	9	−1	6		0–2	1–2	—	3–1
4	Sport Munich	6	0	1	5	2	13	−11	1		0–1	0–4	1–1	—

Rules for classification: 1) points; 2) goal difference; 3) goals scored; 4) draw.

==== Group B ====
Pos	Team	Pld	W	D	L	GF	GA	GD	Pts	Qualification	CSR	SIE	UFM	ADE
1	Credicoop San Román	6	5	0	1	20	6	+14	15	Advance to National stage	—	5–1	3–1	4–1
2	SIEN Carabaya	6	4	1	1	17	9	+8	13	Advance to National stage	2–1	—	2–1	9–0
3	Fuerza Minera	6	1	1	4	11	14	−3	4		1–2	2–2	—	5–2
4	AD Vilquechico	6	1	0	5	6	25	−19	3		0–5	0–1	3–1	—

Rules for classification: 1) points; 2) goal difference; 3) goals scored; 4) draw.

=== Final group stage ===
Pos	Team	Pld	W	D	L	GF	GA	GD	Pts	Qualification	AU	SIE	CSR	EST
1	Alfonso Ugarte	6	3	2	1	13	5	+8	11	Advance to Play-off	—	3–1	1–1	2–0
2	SIEN Carabaya	6	3	2	1	10	5	+5	11	Advance to Play-off	0–0	—	1–1	3–0
3	Credicoop San Román	6	3	2	1	9	5	+4	11	Advance to Play-off	2–1	1–2	—	W.O.
4	Estudiantes Puno	6	0	0	6	1	18	−17	0		1–6	0–3	0–1	—

Rules for classification: 1) points; 2) goal difference; 3) goals scored; 4) draw.

Because three teams were tied in points two play-off matches were played between third place and second place and between second place and first.

==== Play-off ====
2nd & 3rd play-off		1st & 2nd play-off
		Alfonso Ugarte (a.e.t.)	3
Credicoop San Román	1	SIEN Carabaya	1
SIEN Carabaya (a.e.t.)	2

===== 2nd & 3rd-place play-off =====
3 September 2017
15:00

SIEN Carabaya	2–1 (a.e.t.)	Credicoop San Román

Estadio E. Torres Belón, Puno

===== 1st & 2nd-place play-off =====
6 September 2017
15:00

Alfonso Ugarte	3–1 (a.e.t.)	SIEN Carabaya

Estadio E. Torres Belón, Puno

Alfonso Ugarte and SIEN advance on to the National stage.

== Liga Departamental de San Martín ==
=== First stage ===
==== North Zone ====
Team 1	Agg.	Team 2	1st leg	2nd leg
Deportivo Ucrania	6–0	Sport Agrario	6–0	0–0
Academia Fortal	1–4	Nueva Rioja	1–2	0–2
Kechwas Lamistas	(6) 0–0 (7)	Deportivo Hospital	0–0	0–0

Kechwas Lamistas advanced to the next round as the best runner-up.

==== Central Zone ====
Team 1	Agg.	Team 2	1st leg	2nd leg
José Carlos Mariátegui	5–1	Cabellitos FC	3–1	2–0
San José Agua Blanca	6–2	Power Maíz	4–0	2–2
Santa Rosa (M)	16–3	Sport Santa Ana	10–2	6–1

Power Maíz advanced to the next round as the best runner-up.

==== South Zone ====
Team 1	Agg.	Team 2	1st leg	2nd leg
Deportivo Comercio	6–2	Oriental Sporting	2–1	4–1
Bellavista FC	(4) 3–3 (5)	Sport Loreto	2–1	1–2
Saposoa FC	4–1	Sport Nuevo Lima	4–1	0–0

Bellavista FC advanced to the next round as the best runner-up.

=== Second stage ===
==== North Zone ====
Team 1	Agg.	Team 2	1st leg	2nd leg
Kechwas Lamistas	0–2	Deportivo Ucrania	0–0	0–2
Nueva Rioja	3–4	Deportivo Hospital	1–2	2–2

==== Central Zone ====
Team 1	Agg.	Team 2	1st leg	2nd leg
Santa Rosa (M)	5–3	Power Maíz	3–2	2–1
José Carlos Mariátegui	4–2	San José Agua Blanca	3–1	1–1

==== South Zone ====
Team 1	Agg.	Team 2	1st leg	2nd leg
Saposoa FC	3–2	Sport Loreto	1–2	2–0
Deportivo Comercio	1–2	Bellavista FC	1–0	0–2

=== Third stage ===
Team 1	Agg.	Team 2	1st leg	2nd leg
Deportivo Hospital	–	Saposoa	2–4	–
Santa Rosa (M)	–	Bellavista FC	2–1	–
José Carlos Mariátegui	–	Deportivo Ucrania	3–1	–

Saposoa FC advanced to the next round as the best runner-up.

=== Fourth stage ===
Semifinals
Deportivo Ucrania	6	1	7
Saposoa	4	4	8
José Carlos Mariátegui (P)	2	1	3
Santa Rosa (M)	2	0	2

Finals
Saposoa
José Carlos Mariátegui (P)

== Liga Departamental de Tacna ==
=== First stage ===
Pos	Team	Pld	W	D	L	GF	GA	GD	Pts	Qualification	BOL	EGB	MIL	ABR	DFT	JVL
1	Coronel Bolognesi	5	4	0	1	44	5	+39	12	Advance to Semifinals	—	0–2	–	5–0	10–0	22–0
2	EGB Tacna Heroica	5	4	0	1	25	8	+17	12	Advance to Semifinals	–	—	–	3–1	14–2	5–1
3	Mariscal Miller	5	4	0	1	24	9	+15	12	Advance to Semifinals	5–4	1–3	—	1–0	8–2	9–0
4	Juventud Alba Roja	5	1	1	3	13	13	0	4	Advance to Semifinals	–	–	–	—	3–3	–
5	Defensor Ticaco	5	1	1	3	14	37	−23	4		–	–	–	–	—	–
6	Juventud Locumba	5	0	0	5	4	52	−48	0		–	–	–	1–9	2–7	—

Rules for classification: 1) points; 2) goal difference; 3) goals scored; 4) draw.

=== Second stage ===
Semifinals
1	Coronel Bolognesi	2
4	Juventud Alba Roja	0
2	EGB Tacna Heroica (p)	3 (6)
3	Mariscal Miller	3 (7)

Finals
1	Coronel Bolognesi	2
3	Mariscal Miller	1

== Liga Departamental de Tumbes ==
=== First stage ===
==== Group A ====
Pos	Team	Pld	W	D	L	GF	GA	GD	Pts	Qualification
1	Sport Unión	3	3	0	0	7	2	+5	9	Advance to National stage
2	6 de Diciembre PNP	3	2	0	1	9	3	+6	6	Advance to National stage
3	Renovación Cerro Blanco	3	1	0	2	8	6	+2	3	
4	Ricardo Soto	3	0	0	3	3	16	−13	0	

Rules for classification: 1) points; 2) goal difference; 3) goals scored; 4) draw.

==== Group B ====
Pos	Team	Pld	W	D	L	GF	GA	GD	Pts	Qualification
1	Sport El Tablazo	3	2	1	0	5	0	+5	7	Advance to National stage
2	Independiente Aguas Verdes	3	2	0	1	7	2	+5	6	Advance to National stage
3	Barcelona de Acapulco	3	1	1	1	4	6	−2	4	
4	Nuevo Aguas Verdes	3	0	0	3	2	10	−8	0	

Rules for classification: 1) points; 2) goal difference; 3) goals scored; 4) draw.

==== Results ====
Home \ Away	ANA	BAR	IAV	RCB	RIC	SET	SPU	PNP
Nuevo Aguas Verdes								
Barcelona de Acapulco	3–2		1–4			0–0		
Independiente Aguas Verdes	3–0							
Renovación Cerro Blanco								
Ricardo Soto				2–6				
Sport El Tablazo	4–0		1–0					
Sport Unión				2–1	3–1			
6 de Diciembre PNP				2–1	7–0		0–2	

Updated to match(es) played on September 2017. Source: CopaPeru.pe
Legend: Blue = home team win; Yellow = draw; Red = away team win.

=== Second stage ===
Pos	Team	Pld	W	D	L	GF	GA	GD	Pts	Qualification	IAV	SET	PNP	SPU
1	Independiente Aguas Verdes	3	3	0	0	13	4	+9	9	Advance to National stage	—	–	2–1	6–3
2	El Tablazo	3	2	0	1	4	6	−2	6	Advance to National stage	0–5	—	2–1	2–0
3	6 de Diciembre PNP	2	0	0	2	2	4	−2	0		–	–	—	N.P.
4	Sport Unión	2	0	0	2	3	8	−5	0		–	–	–	—

Rules for classification: 1) points; 2) goal difference; 3) goals scored; 4) draw.

== Liga Departamental de Ucayali ==
=== First stage ===
La Paz from Puerto Inca Province is actually from the Huánuco Region but play in the Ucayali Region and thus received a bye to the second stage of the tournament.

Team 1	Agg.	Team 2	1st leg	2nd leg
Defensor San Alejandro (a)	1–1	Pucallpa FC	0–0	1–1
Miguel Grau	1–5	Comandante Alvariño	1–3	0–2
San Juan	3–2	Cocaleros	3–2	N.P.

=== Second stage ===
Pos	Team	Pld	W	D	L	GF	GA	GD	Pts	Qualification	CMA	DSA	COC	LPZ
1	Comandante Alvariño	3	2	1	0	13	4	+9	7	Advance to National stage	—	–	–	7–2
2	Defensor San Alejandro	3	1	1	1	5	3	+2	4	Advance to National stage	1–1	—	1–1	3–1
3	Cocaleros	3	1	1	1	7	9	−2	4		1–5	–	—	5–3
4	La Paz	3	0	0	3	6	15	−9	0		–	–	–	—

Rules for classification: 1) points; 2) goal difference; 3) goals scored; 4) draw.
