= Erick Perleche =

Peruvian footballer (born 2000)

Personal information
- Full name: Erick Anthony Perleche Cruzado
- Date of birth: 15 August 2000 (age 26)
- Place of birth: José Leonardo Ortiz, Peru
- Height: 1.70 m (5 ft 7 in)
- Position: Midfielder

Team information
- Current team: Alianza Atlético
- Number: 21

Youth career
- Academia Cantolao
- Juan Aurich Pastor

Senior career*
Years	Team	Apps	(Gls)
2017	Juan Aurich Pastor	9	(1)
2018–2019	Pirata	42	(9)
2020–2022	Cienciano	70	(0)
2023	Carlos A. Mannucci	23	(0)
2024	Deportivo Garcilaso	22	(1)
2025–	Alianza Atlético	33	(3)
- * Club domestic league appearances and goals as of 19:39, 6 December 2025 (UTC)

Erick Anthony Perleche Cruzado (born 15 August 2000) is a Peruvian footballer who plays as a midfielder for Peruvian Primera División side Alianza Atlético.

== Club career ==
=== Early years ===
Perleche was born and raised in the district of José Leonardo Ortiz, in the Chiclayo Province of the Lambayeque Region. Perleche started playing football at Colegio Deportivo Adeu in Chiclayo and later began playing football on club level for Academia Cantolao.

After that, he moved to Juan Aurich Pastor, where he made his senior debut. He played for the clubs first team in the 2017 Copa Perú. He reached the second round of the national stage with his team, as a starter, scoring a goal against Sport El Tablazo in the process.

=== Pirata ===
In 2018, Perleche moved to Pirata FC together with his coach from Juan Aurich Pastor, César Sánchez. Pirata F.C. was at that time named Molinos El Pirata. Eventually, he was part of the team that became champion of the 2018 Copa Perú, achieving promotion with Pirata FC to the Peruvian Primera División, for the first time in its history. In the very final of the tournament, Perleche scored two of the goals with which Molinos el Pirata beat Unión Deportivo Ascensión de Huancavelica 6–0. In that season, Pirata also won the 2018 Liga Distrital de José Leonardo Ortiz, 2018 Liga Departamental de Lambayeque and 2018 Liga Provincial de Chiclayo.

Perleche was one of the six players from the champion squad who stayed at the club to play the first division. On February 18, 2019, he made his debut in the top flight, playing as a starter in Pirata FC's first victory in League 1 after beating Real Garcilaso 2–1. Although he got plenty of playing time, he ended up losing the starting position in midfield and could not prevent his team's relegation to Liga 2.

Perleche made a total of 25 appearances in the first division and three in cup games.

=== Later clubs ===
In December 2019 it was confirmed, that 19-year old Perleche had joined Liga 1 club Cienciano. Perleche made 20 appearances in his first season at the club.

In December 2022, Perleche signed with Carlos A. Mannucci.

After a year at Carlos A. Mannucci, Perleche left the club to join Deportivo Garcilaso ahead of the 2024 season.

Ahead of the 2025 season, Perleche joined Alianza Atlético.

== International career ==
In May 2019, 18-year old Perleche was called up to train with the Peruvian U23 national team ahead of the 2019 Pan American Games, however he did not make the final list.

== Honors ==
Pirata

- Copa Perú: 2018
