= Las Palmas de Chota =

- Full name: Club Deportivo Las Palmas
- Founded: November 25, 2016; 9 years ago
- Ground: Estadio Municipal de Chota, Chota
- League: Copa Perú
Home colours

Club Deportivo Las Palmas (sometimes referred as Las Palmas) is a Peruvian football club, playing in the city of Chota, Cajamarca, Peru.

== History ==
The Club Deportivo Las Palmas was founded on November 25, 2016.

In the 2017 Copa Perú, the club qualified to the National Stage, but was eliminated by Diablos Rojos (HV) in the Quarterfinals.

In the 2018 Copa Perú, the club qualified to the National Stage, but was eliminated by UDA in the Quarterfinals.

In the 2019 Copa Perú, the club qualified to the National Stage, but was eliminated by Deportivo Llacuabamba in the Round of 16.

In the 2021 Copa Perú, the club qualified to the National Stage, but was eliminated by UDP in the Fase 2 – Interregional.

== Honours ==
=== Regional ===
- Liga Departamental de Cajamarca:

Winners (2): 2018, 2019
Runner-up (2): 2017, 2025

- Liga Provincial de Chota:

Winners (2): 2017, 2022

- Liga Distrital de Chota:

Runner-up (1): 2017

== See also ==
- List of football clubs in Peru
- Peruvian football league system
