= Sport Huanta =

- Full name: Club Deportivo Cultural Sport Huanta
- Founded: February 17, 2012
- Ground: Estadio Ciudad de Cumaná; Ayacucho, Peru
- Capacity: 12,000
- League: Copa Perú
Home colours

Club Deportivo Cultural Sport Huanta (sometimes referred as Sport Huanta) is a Peruvian football club, playing in the city of Huanta, Ayacucho, Peru.

== History ==
The Club Deportivo Cultural Sport Huanta was founded on February 17, 2012.

In 2013 Copa Perú, the club qualified to the Provincial Stage, but was eliminated when it finished in third place.

In 2015 Copa Perú, the club qualified to the Departamental Stage, but was eliminated by Deportivo Municipal (Kimbiri) in the Quarterfinals.

In 2016 Copa Perú, the club qualified to the National Stage, but was eliminated by José María Arguedas in the Repechage.

In 2017 Copa Perú, the club qualified to the Departamental Stage, but was eliminated by Los Audaces de Mayapo in the Semifinals.

In 2018 Copa Perú, the club qualified to the National Stage, but was eliminated by Santos in the Second Stage.

In 2019 Copa Perú, the club qualified to the National Stage, but was eliminated by Sport Chavelines in the Round of 16.

== Rivalries ==
Sport Huanta has had a long-standing rivalry with local club Player Villafuerte. The rivalry between Villafuerte and Huanta known as the Clásico Huantino.

== Coach ==
- (Peru) Aristóteles Ramos Escate (2016)

== Honours ==
=== Regional ===
- Liga Departamental de Ayacucho:

Winners (2): 2018, 2019
Runner-up (1): 2016

- Liga Provincial de Huanta:

Winners (2): 2016, 2018
Runner-up (3): 2015, 2017, 2019

- Liga Distrital de Huanta:

Winners (2): 2013, 2016
Runner-up (4): 2017, 2018, 2019, 2026

== See also ==
- List of football clubs in Peru
- Peruvian football league system
