= Unión San Martín =

- Full name: Club Sport Unión San Martín
- Founded: 28 December 1948; 76 years ago
- Ground: Estadio Teobaldo Pinillos Olaechea, Pisco
- Chairman: (Peru) Hugo Franco Farfán
- Manager: (Peru) Lizandro Barbarán
- League: Copa Perú
| Home colours | Away colours |

Unión San Martín is a Peruvian football club located in the city of Pisco, Peru.

== History ==
=== Copa Perú ===
The Club Sport Unión San Martín was founded in 1948.

In 2016 Copa Perú, the club qualified to the Departamental Stage, but was eliminated by Francisco Oropeza in the Quarterfinals.

In 2017 Copa Perú, the club qualified to the National Stage, but was eliminated by Binacional in the Quarterfinals.

In 2018 Copa Perú, the club qualified to the Departamental Stage, but was eliminated by Santos in the Quarterfinals.

In 2019 Copa Perú, the club qualified to the Provincial Stage, but was eliminated by Las Américas in the Semifinals.

In 2021 Copa Perú, the club qualified to the National Stage, but was eliminated when it finished in 6th place.

== Honours ==
=== Regional ===
- Liga Departamental de Ica:

Winners (3): 1991, 2017, 2022

- Liga Provincial de Pisco:

Winners (3): 1991, 2008, 2017
Runner-up (2): 2010, 2016

- Liga Distrital de Pisco:

Winners (3): 1991, 2012, 2015
Runner-up (5): 1989, 2010, 2016, 2017, 2019

== See also ==
- List of football clubs in Peru
- Peruvian football league system
