= Social Corire =

- Full name: Club Social Corire
- Nicknames: La Estrellita Solitaria; Granates
- Founded: June 13, 1943; 82 years ago
- Ground: Estadio José Ricketts, Corire
- League: Copa Perú
Home colours	Away colours

Club Social Corire (sometimes referred as Social Corire) is a football club, playing in the city of Corire, in Castilla Province, Arequipa Department, Peru.

== History ==
The Club Social Corire was founded on June 13, 1943.

In 2009 Liga Superior de Arequipa, the club was eliminated when it finished in 4th place.

In 2011 Copa Perú, the club qualified to the Departamental Stage, but was eliminated when it finished in 3rd place.

In 2015 Copa Perú, the club qualified to the Departamental Stage, but was eliminated by La Colina in the Semifinals.

In 2016 Copa Perú, the club qualified to the Departamental Stage, but was eliminated by San Jacinto in the Second Stage.

In 2017 Copa Perú, the club qualified to the Departamental Stage, but was eliminated by Sportivo Huracán in the Second Stage.

In 2018 Copa Perú, the club qualified to the National Stage, but was eliminated when it finished in 46th place.

== Honours ==
=== Regional ===
- Liga Departamental de Arequipa:

Runner-up (3): 1971, 1978, 2018

- Liga Provincial de Castilla:

Winners (15): 1967, 1969, 1970, 1971, 1973, 1974, 1975, 1976, 1978, 1979, 2011, 2014, 2015, 2016, 2017
Runner-up (2): 2000, 2013

- Liga Unificada de Castilla:

Winners (1): 2018

- Liga Distrital de Uraca:

Winners (4): 1978, 2015, 2016, 2017

== See also ==
- List of football clubs in Peru
- Peruvian football league system
