= Cultural Sachapuyos =

Sachapuyos
- Full name: Club Social Deportivo y Cultural Sachapuyos
- Founded: September 5, 1952; 73 years ago
- Ground: Gran Kuélap, Chachapoyas
- Capacity: 6,000
- League: Copa Perú
Home colours	Away colours

Club Social Deportivo y Cultural Sachapuyos (sometimes referred as Sachapuyos) is a Peruvian football club, playing in the city of Chachapoyas, Amazonas, Peru.

== History ==
The Club Cultural Sachapuyos was founded on September 5, 1952.

In 1999 Copa Perú, the club qualified to the Regional Stage, but was eliminated by Deportivo Pomalca in the Group Stage.

In 2000 Copa Perú, the club qualified to the Regional Stage, but was eliminated by Deportivo Pomalca in the Group Stage.

In 2002 Copa Perú, the club qualified to the Regional Stage, but was eliminated by Flamengo in the Group Stage.

In 2017 Copa Perú, the club qualified to the National Stage, but was eliminated when it finished in 27th place.

In 2018 Copa Perú, the club qualified to the Departmental Stage, but was eliminated by Bagua Grande in the Semifinals.

== Honours ==
=== Regional ===
- Liga Departamental de Amazonas:

Winners (10): 1977, 1990, 1993, 1995, 1996, 1997, 1999, 2000, 2002, 2026
Runner-up (1): 2017

- Liga Provincial de Chachapoyas:

Winners (7): 1977, 1990, 2002, 2012, 2018, 2022, 2026
Runner-up (3): 2017, 2019, 2025

- Liga Distrital de Chachapoyas:

Winners (3): 2002, 2017, 2018
Runner-up (5): 2012, 2019, 2022, 2025, 2026

== See also ==
- List of football clubs in Peru
- Peruvian football league system
