= Player Villafuerte =

- Full name: Fútbol Club Player Villafuerte
- Founded: April 14, 2011; 14 years ago
- Ground: Estadio Ciudad de Cumaná; Ayacucho, Peru
- Capacity: 12,000
- League: Copa Perú
Home colours

Fútbol Club Player Villafuerte (sometimes referred as Player Villafuerte) is a Peruvian football club, playing in the city of Huanta, Ayacucho, Peru.

== History ==
The Fútbol Club Player Villafuerte was founded on April 14, 2011.

In 2014 Copa Perú, the club qualified to the National Stage, but was eliminated by Sport Águila in the 16th round.

In 2015 Copa Perú, the club qualified to the National Stage, but was eliminated when it finished in the 38th place.

In 2017 Copa Perú, the club qualified to the National Stage, but was eliminated when it finished in the 33rd place.

In 2018 Copa Perú, the club qualified to the Departmental Stage, but was eliminated by San Cristóbal in the semifinals.

== Rivalries ==
Player Villafuerte has had a long-standing rivalry with local club Sport Huanta. The rivalry between Villafuerte and Huanta known as the Clásico Huantino.

== Honours ==
=== Regional ===
- Región VI:

Runner-up (1): 2014

- Liga Departamental de Ayacucho:

Winners (2): 2014, 2015
Runner-up (1): 2017

- Liga Provincial de Huanta:

Winners (6): 2014, 2015, 2017, 2019, 2023, 2024
Runner-up (1): 2018, 2022

- Liga Distrital de Huanta:

Winners (7): 2014, 2017, 2018, 2019, 2023, 2024, 2025
Runner-up (2): 2015, 2022

== See also ==
- List of football clubs in Peru
- Peruvian football league system
