= Social Venus de Huacho =

Venus
- Full name: Club Deportivo Social Venus de Huacho
- Nickname(s): La Fuerza Morada
- Founded: April 19, 1980
- Ground: Estadio Segundo Aranda Torres, Huacho
- Capacity: 8,000
- League: Copa Perú
Home colours

Club Deportivo Social Venus de Huacho (sometimes referred as Venus or Venus de Huacho) is a Peruvian football club, playing in the city of Huacho, Lima, Peru.

== History ==
The Club Deportivo Social Venus de Huacho was founded on April 19, 1980.

In the 2013 Copa Perú, the club qualified to the Departamental Stage, but was eliminated by AIPSA in the Semifinals.

In the 2014 Copa Perú, the club qualified to the Departamental Stage, but was eliminated by Cumbre 2000 in the Second Stage.

In the 2015 Copa Perú, the club qualified to the Departamental Stage, but was eliminated by DIM in the Semifinals.

In the 2016 Copa Perú, the club qualified to the National Stage, but was eliminated by Sport Rosario in the Round of 16.

In the 2017 Copa Perú, the club qualified to the Departamental Stage, but was eliminated by Independiente in the First Stage.

In the 2018 Copa Perú, the club qualified to the National Stage, but was eliminated by Santos in the Quarterfinals.

In the 2019 Copa Perú, the club qualified to the Departamental Stage, but was eliminated by DIM in the Semifinals.

== Honours ==
=== Regional ===
- Liga Departamental de Lima:

Winners (1): 2016
Runner-up (1): 2018

- Liga Provincial de Huaura:

Winners (4): 2012, 2014, 2016, 2018
Runner-up (4): 2011, 2013, 2015

== See also ==
- List of football clubs in Peru
- Peruvian football league system
