= Unión Santo Domingo =

- Full name: Club Social Deportivo Cultural Unión Santo Domingo
- Nickname(s): "Los Purtus"
- Founded: February 10, 1979; 46 years ago
- Stadium: Estadio Kuélap, Chachapoyas
- Capacity: 6,000
- League: Copa Perú
Home colours	Away colours

Club Social Deportivo Cultural Unión Santo Domingo (better known as Los Purtus) is a Peruvian football club, playing in the city of Chachapoyas, Amazonas, Peru.

== History ==
The Club Cultural Union Santo Domingo was founded on February 10, 1979.

In 2007 Copa Perú, the club qualified to the Regional Stage, but was eliminated by Sporting Pizarro in the Group Stage.

In 2009 Copa Perú, the club qualified to the Regional Stage, but was eliminated by Defensor San José in the Group Stage.

In 2010 Copa Perú, the club qualified to the National Stage, but was eliminated by Defensor San José in the Group Stage.

In 2016 Copa Perú, the club qualified to the National Stage, but was eliminated by San José de Agua Blanca in the Repechage.

In 2017 Copa Perú, the club qualified to the National Stage, but was eliminated when it finished in 32nd place.

== Coach ==
- (Peru) Euler Miollaja (2010)
- (Peru) Fernando Seminario (2016)
- (Peru) Juan Miguel Pérez (2017)
- (Peru) César Sánchez (2022)
- (Peru) Homar Reinoso La Rosa (2023)
- (Peru) Fernando Villanueva Zuta (2023)
- (Peru) Bárnaby Llosa (2023)
- (Peru) César “El Flaco” Sánchez (2024)
- (Peru) Daniel Valderrama (2024)

== Honours ==
=== Senior titles ===
Keys

- Record
- ^{(s)} Shared record

Type	Competition	Titles	Runner-up	Winning years	Runner-up years
Regional (League)	Liga Departamental de Amazonas	5	3	2007, 2016, 2017, 2023, 2024	2009, 2010, 2022
Regional (League)	Liga Provincial de Chachapoyas	2	7	2014, 2017	2009, 2010, 2011, 2016, 2022, 2023, 2024
Regional (League)	Liga Distrital de Chachapoyas	4	3	2010, 2011, 2016, 2022	2009, 2014, 2017

== See also ==
- List of football clubs in Peru
- Peruvian football league system
