= Club Deportivo El Inca =

El Inca
- Full name: Club Social Cultural Deportivo El Inca
- Founded: 1 January 1973
- Ground: Estadio Carlos Wiese; Chao
- Chairman: Javier Mendoza Torres
- League: Copa Perú
Home colours	Away colours

Club Social Cultural Deportivo El Inca (sometimes referred as El Inca) is a Peruvian football club, playing in the city of Chao, Virú, La Libertad, Peru. The club currently participates in the Copa Perú, the fourth tier of the Peruvian football league system.

== History ==
The Club Social Cultural Deportivo El Inca was founded on 1 January 1973.

In 2016 Copa Perú, the club qualified to the Departamental Stage, but was eliminated when it finished in 3rd place.

In 2017 Copa Perú, the club qualified to the National Stage, but was eliminated when it finished in 38th place.

In 2018 Copa Perú, the club qualified to the National Stage, but was eliminated when it finished in 30th place.

In 2019 Copa Perú, the club qualified to the Departamental Stage, but was eliminated by Atlético Verdún in the Second Stage.

== Honours ==
=== Regional ===
- Liga Departamental de La Libertad:

Winners (1): 2017
Runner-up (3): 2018, 2024, 2026

- Liga Provincial de Virú:

Winners (13): 2007, 2008, 2009, 2011, 2012, 2014, 2016, 2017, 2018, 2019, 2023, 2024, 2026

- Liga Distrital de Chao:

Winners (16): 2007, 2008, 2009, 2011, 2012, 2013, 2014, 2015, 2016, 2017, 2018, 2019, 2022, 2023, 2024, 2025

== See also ==
- List of football clubs in Peru
- Peruvian football league system
