= Defensor Laure Sur =

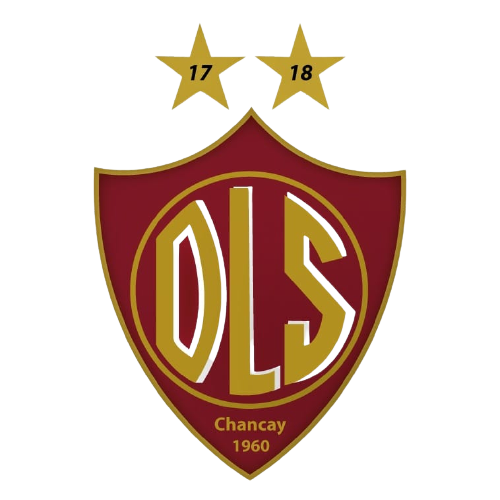
- Full name: Club Defensor Laure Sur
- Nickname: Guindas
- Founded: October 24, 1960
- Ground: Rómulo Shaw Cisneros, Chancay
- Capacity: 3,500
- League: Copa Perú
Home colours	Away colours

Club Defensor Laure Sur (sometimes referred as Defensor Laure Sur) is a Peruvian football club, playing in the city of Chancay, Lima, Peru.

== History ==
The Club Defensor Laure Sur was founded on October 24, 1960.

In the 2015 Copa Perú, the club qualified to the National Stage, but was eliminated when it finished in 45th place.

In the 2017 Copa Perú, the club qualified to the National Stage, but was eliminated by Binacional in the Round of 16.

In the 2018 Copa Perú, the club qualified to the Departamental Stage, but was eliminated by Pirata in the Round of 16.

In the 2021 Copa Perú, the club qualified to the Regional Stage, but was eliminated by Los Ángeles Negros in the Fase 1.

== Honours ==
=== Regional ===
- Liga Departamental de Lima:

Winners (2): 2017, 2018
Runner-up (1): 2015

- Liga Provincial de Huaral:

Winners (4): 1987, 2015, 2017, 2018
Runner-up (2): 2016

- Liga Distrital de Chancay:

Winners (2): 1987, 2017
Runner-up (1): 2015

== See also ==
- List of football clubs in Peru
- Peruvian football league system
