= Cartavio, Peru =

- City
- Location within Peru
- Coordinates: 7°53′0″S 79°13′0″W
- Country: Peru
- District: Santiago de Cao
- Province: Ascope

Area
  - Total: 128.72 km^{2} (49.70 sq mi)
- Highest elevation: 116 m (381 ft)

Population (2002 Census)
  - Total: 19,842

Cartavio belongs to the district of Santiago de Cao, Ascope Province, in the department of La Libertad in Peru. Its coastal location is north of Lima, at a latitude of 7°53'S and longitude of 79°13W and an altitude of 16m above sea level.

Sugar cane grows in the area and Cartavio has been home to the Cartavio Sugar Company since 1891. Once the site of rum production for Ron Cartavio, currently the sugar mill produces not only sugar but also up to 15 million litres of ethanol per year, which could be used by petroleum companies to replace the lead in petrol and thereby reducing the emissions of air pollutants.
