= Diablos Rojos de Huancavelica =

Diablos Rojos
- Full name: Club Social Diablos Rojos
- Nickname: Guindas
- Founded: July 14, 1968
- Ground: Estadio IPD de Huancavelica, Huancavelica
- Capacity: 2,500
- League: Copa Perú
Home colours

Club Social Diablos Rojos (sometimes referred as Diablos Rojos (HV)) is a Peruvian football club, playing in the city of Huancavelica, Peru.

== History ==
The Club Social Diablos Rojos was founded on July 14, 1968.

In the 1995 Copa Perú, the club qualified to the National Stage, but was eliminated when it finished in 6th place.

In the 2003 Copa Perú, the club qualified to the Regional Stage, but was eliminated by Deportivo Educación in the Group Stage.

In the 2009 Copa Perú, the club qualified to the Regional Stage, but was eliminated by Froebel Deportes in the Group Stage.

In the 2017 Copa Perú, the club qualified to the National Stage, but was eliminated by Las Palmas in the Quarterfinals.

== Coach ==
- (Peru) Pedro Ruiz Barra (1995)
- (Peru) José Pari (2017)
- (Peru) Humberto Pari (2023)
- (Peru) Elmer Castro (2023)
- (Peru) Rildo Laurante (2023)
- (Peru) Jerson Bilbao (2023)
- (Peru) José Pari (2023)

== Honours ==
=== Regional ===
- Liga Departamental de Huancavelica:

Winners (7): 1981, 1983, 1984, 1985, 2003, 2009, 2017
Runner-up (2): 2023, 2025

- Liga Provincial de Huancavelica:

Winners (8): 1981, 1983, 1984, 1985, 2003, 2009, 2017, 2025
Runner-up (1): 2023

- Liga Distrital de Huancavelica:

Winners (9): 1975, 1978, 1981, 1995, 2003, 2010, 2011, 2017, 2023
Runner-up (4): 2009, 2012, 2025, 2026

== See also ==
- List of football clubs in Peru
- Peruvian football league system
