= 2018 Copa Perú =

Copa Perú
- Season: 2018
- Champions: Pirata

The 2018 Peru Cup season (Spanish: Copa Perú 2018), the largest amateur tournament of Peruvian football, started in February.

This edition has featured a change, with the elimination of the Regional Stage and the inclusion of participants from all the Regions of Peru in the National Stage. Under the new format, the tournament has four stages.

The format used was created by the Chilean Leandro A. Shara

The 2018 Peru Cup started with the District Stage (Spanish: Etapa Distrital) in February. The next stage was the Provincial Stage (Spanish: Etapa Provincial) which started in June. The tournament continued with the Departmental Stage (Spanish: Etapa Departamental) in July. The National Stage (Spanish: Etapa Nacional) starts in September. The winner of the National Stage will be promoted to the First Division and the runner-up will be promoted to the Second Division.

== Team changes ==
Promoted to 2018 Segunda División	Relegated from 2017 Segunda División	Promoted to 2018 Primera División
▲ Atlético Grau (2nd)	▼ Defensor La Bocana (14th) ▼ Sport Ancash (15th)	▲ Binacional (1st)

== Departmental stage ==
Departmental Stage: 2018 Ligas Departamentales del Peru and 2018 Ligas Superiores del Perú

The following list shows the teams that qualified for the National Stage.

Department	Team	Location
Amazonas	Bagua Grande	Utcubamba
Amazonas	Alipio Ponce Vásquez	Chachapoyas
Ancash	Sport Áncash	Huaraz
Ancash	Academia Sipesa	Santa
Apurímac	Andahuaylas	Apurímac
Apurímac	Retamoso	Abancay
Arequipa	Sportivo Huracán	Arequipa
Arequipa	Social Corire	Castilla
Ayacucho	San Cristobal de Casaorcco	Huamanga
Ayacucho	Sport Huanta	Huanta
Cajamarca	ADA	Jaén
Cajamarca	Las Palmas	Chota
Callao	AEB	Ventanilla
Callao	Alfredo Tomassini	Ventanilla
Cusco	Deportivo Garcilaso	Cusco
Cusco	Deportivo Robles	Calca
Huancavelica	UDA	Huancavelica
Huancavelica	Deportivo Caminos	Huancavelica
Huánuco	Alianza Universidad	Huánuco
Huánuco	León de Huánuco	Huánuco
Ica	Sport Marino	Ica
Ica	Santos	Nasca
Junín	AD Huamantanga	Jauja
Junín	Escuela JTR	Huancayo
La Libertad	Racing	Sánchez Carrión
La Libertad	El Inca	Virú

Department	Team	Location
Lambayeque	Carlos Stein	Chiclayo
Lambayeque	Pirata	Chiclayo
Lima	Venus	Huaura
Lima	Defensor Laure Sur	Chancay
Loreto	Estudiantil CNI	Iquitos
Loreto	Deportivo Caballo Cocha	Mariscal Castilla
Madre de Dios	Deportivo Maldonado	Puerto Maldonado
Madre de Dios	MINSA	Tambopata
Moquegua	Credicoop San Cristóbal	Mariscal Nieto
Moquegua	Hijos del Altiplano y del Pacífico	Ilo
Pasco	San Agustín	Daniel Alcides Carrión
Pasco	Deportivo Municipal (Yanahuanca)	Daniel Alcides Carrión
Piura	Atlético Torino	Talara
Piura	UDP	Sechura
Puno	Alfonso Ugarte	Puno
Puno	Credicoop San Román	Juliaca
San Martín	Unión Tarapoto	San Martín
San Martín	Bellavista	Bellavista
Tacna	Unión Alfonso Ugarte	Tacna
Tacna	Juventud Locumba	Jorge Basadre
Tumbes	UNT	Tumbes
Tumbes	Ferrocarril	Zarumilla
Ucayali	Colegio Comercio	Coronel Portillo
Ucayali	Deportivo Municipal (Aguaytía)	Padre Abad

== National stage ==
In 2015 the National Stage has grown to 50 teams, and the new National Stage, designed by matchVision, is played under Regional using the POT System, with all the Regions of Peru will have represented. The National Stage starts in the first week of September.

In 2017 the same format continues, without the authorization of MatchVision.

This phase features the 50 teams that qualified from the Departmental Stage. Each team plays 3 games at home and 3 games away, for a total of 6 games against 3 different geographical rivals. The departmental stage winners only play against departmental runners-up, and vice versa. All the teams are positioned in one general table. After 6 matches, the team in places 1 to 8 are qualified directly to the Round of 16, while the teams in places 9 to 24 will play the Repechage phase. The teams in places 25 to 50 are eliminated.

The winner of the National Stage will be promoted to the 2019 Torneo Descentralizado and the runner-up of the National Stage will be promoted to the 2019 Peruvian Segunda División.

=== Tie-breaking criteria ===
The ranking of teams in the Unique Table is based on the following criteria:
1. Number of Points
3. Goal difference
4. Number of goals scored
5. Better performance in away matches based on the following criteria:
1. Number of Away Points
3. Goal Difference in away games
4. Number of goals scored in away games
6. Number of First-Half points: considering the half-time results as the final results
7. Drawing of lots

=== League table ===
Pos	Team	Pld	W	D	L	GF	GA	GD	Pts	Qualification
1	UDA	6	6	0	0	13	3	+10	18	Round of 16
2	Sportivo Huracán	6	5	1	0	22	6	+16	16	Round of 16
3	Pirata	6	5	0	1	18	6	+12	15	Round of 16
4	Credicoop San Cristóbal	6	5	0	1	13	7	+6	15	Round of 16
5	Sport Marino	6	4	2	0	12	2	+10	14	Round of 16
6	Alfonso Ugarte	6	4	2	0	21	4	+17	14	Round of 16
7	Unión Alfonso Ugarte	6	4	2	0	14	4	+10	14	Round of 16
8	Retamoso	6	4	1	1	9	5	+4	13	Round of 16
9	Venus	6	4	1	1	13	6	+7	13	Second Round
10	Santos	6	4	1	1	15	5	+10	13	Second Round
11	AD Huamantanga	6	4	1	1	10	4	+6	13	Second Round
12	Atlético Torino	6	4	1	1	10	6	+4	13	Second Round
13	Deportivo Garcilaso	6	4	0	2	9	6	+3	12	Second Round
14	Defensor Laure Sur	6	4	0	2	20	4	+16	12	Second Round
15	Las Palmas	6	4	0	2	14	7	+7	12	Second Round
16	Unión Tarapoto	6	3	2	1	15	8	+7	11	Second Round
17	Credicoop San Román	6	3	2	1	14	4	+10	11	Second Round
18	Bellavista	6	3	2	1	12	7	+5	11	Second Round
19	Deportivo Municipal (Yanahuanca)	6	3	2	1	6	5	+1	11	Second Round
20	Carlos Stein	6	3	1	2	13	7	+6	10	Second Round
21	León de Huánuco	6	3	2	1	11	4	+7	10	Second Round
22	Alianza Universidad	6	2	4	0	12	8	+4	10	Second Round
23	Sport Huanta	6	3	1	2	6	3	+3	10	Second Round
24	Andahuaylas	6	3	0	3	4	5	−1	9	Second Round
25	UDP	6	2	3	1	10	9	+1	9	Ligas Distritales
26	Racing	6	2	3	1	13	5	+8	9	Ligas Distritales
27	Estudiantil CNI	6	2	3	1	4	3	+1	9	Ligas Distritales
28	Deportivo Caballo Cocha	6	2	3	1	9	11	−2	9	Ligas Distritales
29	Deportivo Robles	6	3	0	3	14	5	+9	9	Ligas Distritales
30	El Inca	6	2	2	2	13	10	+3	8	Ligas Distritales
31	ADA	6	2	2	2	6	10	−4	8	Ligas Distritales
32	Academia Sipesa	6	2	2	2	10	13	−3	8	Ligas Distritales
33	Ferrocarril	6	1	3	2	7	14	−7	6	Ligas Distritales
34	Colegio Comercio	6	1	2	3	6	14	−8	5	Ligas Distritales
35	Bagua Grande	6	1	2	3	8	13	−5	5	Ligas Distritales
36	Atlético San Agustín	6	1	1	4	3	15	−12	4	Ligas Distritales
37	Sport Áncash	6	1	1	4	10	19	−9	4	Ligas Distritales
38	Deportivo Caminos	6	1	0	5	4	12	−8	3	Ligas Distritales
39	Deportivo Municipal (Aguaytía)	6	0	3	3	5	8	−3	3	Ligas Distritales
40	Alfredo Tomassini	6	1	0	5	6	17	−11	3	Ligas Distritales
41	AEB	6	1	0	5	4	17	−13	3	Ligas Distritales
42	MINSA	6	1	0	5	7	23	−16	3	Ligas Distritales
43	Deportivo Maldonado	6	1	0	5	4	23	−19	3	Ligas Distritales
44	Juventud Locumba	6	0	1	5	5	13	−8	1	Ligas Distritales
45	Hijos del Altiplano y del Pacífico	6	0	1	5	4	18	−14	1	Ligas Distritales
46	Social Corire	6	0	1	5	5	21	−16	1	Ligas Distritales
47	San Cristobal de Casaorcco	6	0	1	5	5	12	−7	1	Ligas Distritales
48	Escuela JTR	6	0	1	5	4	14	−10	1	Ligas Distritales
49	UNT	6	0	1	5	4	15	−11	1	Ligas Distritales
50	Alipio Ponce Vásquez	6	0	1	5	7	17	−10	1	Ligas Distritales

Updated to match(es) played on 2018. Source: ADFP-SD - official site
Rules for classification: 1) points; 2) goal difference; 3) number of goals scored; 4) head-to-head record; 5) drawing of lots

==== Round 1 ====
Team 1	Score	Team 2
Sportivo Huracán	3–1	Juventud Locumba
Alfredo Tomassini	0–2	Sport Marino
Colegio Comercio	1–1	Deportivo Caballo Cocha
Credicoop San Cristóbal	2–1	Credicoop San Román
Atlético Torino	2–0	UNT
Sport Huanta	0–1	Andahuaylas
Alianza Universidad	2–1	Deportivo Municipal (Aguaytía)
AD Huamantanga	0–0	Atlético San Agustín
Unión Tarapoto	2–1	El Inca
Deportivo Garcilaso	4–0	MINSA
Racing	5–1	Academia Sipesa
Retamoso	2–1	San Cristobal de Casaorcco
Deportivo Municipal (Yanahuanca)	0–0	León de Huánuco
Deportivo Maldonado	1–3	Deportivo Robles
Santos	3–0	Deportivo Caminos
Alfonso Ugarte	1–0	Social Corire
UDA	4–0	Escuela JTR
Ferrocarril	1–1	Carlos Stein
Estudiantil CNI	1–0	Bellavista
Sport Áncash	2–2	Venus
Defensor Laure Sur	1–0	AEB
Unión Alfonso Ugarte	0–0	Hijos del Altiplano y del Pacífico
Pirata	4–1	UDP
Bagua Grande	1–1	ADA
Las Palmas	5–1	Alipio Ponce Vásquez

==== Round 2 ====
Team 1	Score	Team 2
AEB	1–5	Santos
Sport Marino	1–0	Sport Huanta
Carlos Stein	2–0	Las Palmas
ADA	0–0	Racing
UDP	5–3	Ferrocarril
Alipio Ponce Vásquez	0–1	Atlético Torino
Deportivo Municipal (Aguaytía)	0–0	Estudiantil CNI
San Cristobal de Casaorcco	2–3	UDA
MINSA	3–4	Alfonso Ugarte
León de Huánuco	2–0	Colegio Comercio
Deportivo Robles	0–1	Retamoso
Andahuaylas	0–2	Deportivo Garcilaso
Credicoop San Román	8–0	Deportivo Maldonado
Hijos del Altiplano y del Pacífico	0–1	Sportivo Huracán
Escuela JTR	2–2	Deportivo Municipal (Yanahuanca)
Juventud Locumba	1–2	Credicoop San Cristóbal
Deportivo Caminos	2–1	AD Huamantanga
UNT	1–1	Pirata
Venus	4–0	Alfredo Tomassini
El Inca	8–2	Sport Áncash
Academia Sipesa	2–2	Alianza Universidad
Social Corire	1–1	Unión Alfonso Ugarte
Deportivo Caballo Cocha	2–1	Unión Tarapoto
Atlético San Agustín	2–1	Defensor Laure Sur
Bellavista	4–1	Bagua Grande

==== Round 3 ====
Team 1	Score	Team 2
Pirata	0–3	Carlos Stein
Sportivo Huracán	4–1	Social Corire
Colegio Comercio	2–1	Deportivo Municipal (Aguaytía)
Estudiantil CNI	0–0	Deportivo Caballo Cocha
Deportivo Garcilaso	1–0	Deportivo Robles
Credicoop San Cristóbal	2–1	Hijos del Altiplano y del Pacífico
Atlético Torino	2–2	UDP
Unión Alfonso Ugarte	2–1	Juventud Locumba
Alianza Universidad	0–0	León de Huánuco
Deportivo Municipal (Yanahuanca)	1–0	Atlético San Agustín
Alfonso Ugarte	0–0	Credicoop San Román
Deportivo Maldonado	2–1	MINSA
Sport Áncash	3–1	Academia Sipesa
Sport Huanta	2–0	San Cristobal de Casaorcco
Retamoso	2–0	Andahuaylas
AD Huamantanga	3–1	Escuela JTR
Ferrocarril	2–1	UNT
UDA	3–1	Deportivo Caminos
Racing	2–2	El Inca
Defensor Laure Sur	1–0	Venus
Santos	1–1	Sport Marino
Alfredo Tomassini	1–3	AEB
Bagua Grande	4–3	Alipio Ponce Vásquez
Las Palmas	2–0	ADA
Unión Tarapoto	1–1	Bellavista

==== Round 4 ====
Team 1	Score	Team 2
Carlos Stein	1–3	Pirata
UDP	2–0	Atlético Torino
AEB	0–3	Alfredo Tomassini
Sport Marino	2–0	Santos
Deportivo Robles	3–0	Deportivo Garcilaso
Hijos del Altiplano y del Pacífico	1–4	Credicoop San Cristóbal
ADA	3–1	Las Palmas
León de Huánuco	1–4	Alianza Universidad
MINSA	2–1	Deportivo Maldonado
Deportivo Caminos	0–1	UDA
San Cristobal de Casaorcco	0–2	Sport Huanta
Andahuaylas	1–0	Retamoso
Credicoop San Román	1–1	Alfonso Ugarte
Atlético San Agustín	1–2	Deportivo Municipal (Yanahuanca)
Juventud Locumba	0–2	Unión Alfonso Ugarte
Escuela JTR	1–3	AD Huamantanga
UNT	1–1	Ferrocarril
Academia Sipesa	3–1	Sport Áncash
El Inca	0–0	Racing
Venus	1–0	Defensor Laure Sur
Social Corire	2–5	Sportivo Huracán
Deportivo Municipal (Aguaytía)	1–1	Colegio Comercio
Alipio Ponce Vásquez	1–1	Bagua Grande
Bellavista	2–2	Unión Tarapoto
Deportivo Caballo Cocha	1–1	Estudiantil CNI

==== Round 5 ====
Team 1	Score	Team 2
Sportivo Huracán	8–1	Hijos del Altiplano y del Pacífico
Estudiantil CNI	1–0	Deportivo Municipal (Aguaytía)
Deportivo Garcilaso	0–2	Andahuaylas
Credicoop San Cristóbal	3–1	Juventud Locumba
Alianza Universidad	2–2	Academia Sipesa
Atlético Torino	3–1	Alipio Ponce Vásquez
Alfonso Ugarte	10–0	MINSA
Sport Áncash	1–2	El Inca
AD Huamantanga	2–0	Deportivo Caminos
Retamoso	2–1	Deportivo Robles
Unión Alfonso Ugarte	5–1	Social Corire
Deportivo Maldonado	0–2	Credicoop San Román
Santos	4–0	AEB
Deportivo Municipal (Yanahuanca)	1–0	Atlético San Agustín
Ferrocarril	0–0	UDP
Las Palmas	3–0	Carlos Stein
Pirata	5–0	UNT
Colegio Comercio	0–6	León de Huánuco
UDA	1–0	San Cristobal de Casaorcco
Racing	6–1	ADA
Unión Tarapoto	6–2	Deportivo Caballo Cocha
Alfredo Tomassini	2–3	Venus
Sport Huanta	1–1	Sport Marino
Defensor Laure Sur	10–0	Atlético San Agustín
Bagua Grande	1–3	Bellavista

==== Round 6 ====
Team 1	Score	Team 2
Juventud Locumba	1–1	Sportivo Huracán
Sport Marino	5–0	Alfredo Tomassini
Deportivo Caballo Cocha	3–2	Colegio Comercio
Credicoop San Román	2–1	Credicoop San Cristóbal
UNT	1–2	Atlético Torino
Andahuaylas	0–1	Sport Huanta
Deportivo Municipal (Aguaytía)	2–2	Alianza Universidad
Atlético San Agustín	0–1	AD Huamantanga
El Inca	0–3	Unión Tarapoto
MINSA	1–2	Deportivo Garcilaso
Academia Sipesa	1–0	Racing
San Cristobal de Casaorcco	2–2	Retamoso
León de Huánuco	2–0	Deportivo Municipal (Yanahuanca)
Deportivo Robles	7–0	Deportivo Maldonado
Deportivo Caminos	1–2	Santos
Social Corire	0–5	Alfonso Ugarte
Escuela JTR	0–1	UDA
Carlos Stein	6–0	Ferrocarril
Bellavista	2–1	Estudiantil CNI
Venus	3–1	Sport Áncash
AEB	1–7	Defensor Laure Sur
Hijos del Altiplano y del Pacífico	1–4	Unión Alfonso Ugarte
UDP	0–3	Pirata
ADA	2–1	Bagua Grande
Alipio Ponce Vásquez	1–4	Las Palmas

=== Second round ===
Team 1	Agg.	Team 2	1st leg	2nd leg
Andahuaylas	3–4	Venus	3–0	0–4
Sport Huanta	2–5	Santos	2–3	0–2
Alianza Universidad	3–1	AD Huamantanga	2–0	1–1
León de Huánuco	1–2	Atlético Torino	1–1	0–1
Carlos Stein	4–4	Deportivo Garcilaso (s)	4–0	0–4
Deportivo Municipal (Yanahuanca)	5–6	Defensor Laure Sur	3–0	2–6
Bellavista	3–4	Las Palmas	3–1	0–3
Credicoop San Román	7–1	Unión Tarapoto	4–1	3–0

=== Bracket ===
Round of 16
1	UDA	1	5	6
17	Credicoop San Román	1	0	1
15	Las Palmas	3	1	4
2	Sportivo Huracán	0	2	2
14	Defensor Laure Sur	2	2	4
3	Pirata (s)	2	2	4
4	Credicoop San Cristóbal (s)	1	2	3
13	Deportivo Garcilaso	2	1	3
5	Sport Marino	0	2	2
12	Atlético Torino	3	0	3
22	Alianza Universidad (a)	2	1	3
6	Alfonso Ugarte	0	3	3
7	Unión Alfonso Ugarte	1	2	3
10	Santos	3	2	5
9	Venus	1	2	3
8	Retamoso	0	2	2

Quarterfinals
1	UDA (a)	2	1	3
15	Las Palmas	3	0	3
3	Pirata	0	5	5
4	Credicoop San Cristóbal	3	1	4
12	Atlético Torino	1	1	2
22	Alianza Universidad	2	1	3
10	Santos	1	1	2
9	Venus	0	1	1

Semifinals
UDA
Pirata
Alianza Universidad
Santos

Champion & Runner-up
Pirata
Alianza Universidad

=== Round of 16 ===
Team 1	Agg.	Team 2	1st leg	2nd leg
Credicoop San Román	1–6	UDA	1–1	0–5
Las Palmas	4–2	Sportivo Huracán	3–0	1–2
Deportivo Garcilaso	3–3	Credicoop San Cristóbal (s)	2–1	1–2
Atlético Torino	3–2	Sport Marino	3–0	0–2
Defensor Laure Sur	4–4	Pirata (s)	2–2	2–2
Alianza Universidad (a)	3–3	Alfonso Ugarte	2–0	1–3
Santos	5–3	Unión Alfonso Ugarte	3–1	2–2
Venus	3–2	Retamoso	1–0	2–2

=== Quarterfinals ===
Team 1	Agg.	Team 2	1st leg	2nd leg
Las Palmas	3–3	UDA (a)	3–2	0–1
Credicoop San Cristóbal	4–5	Pirata	3–0	1–5
Alianza Universidad	3–2	Atlético Torino	2–1	1–1
Santos	2–1	Venus	1–0	1–1

=== Final group stage ===
==== Standings ====
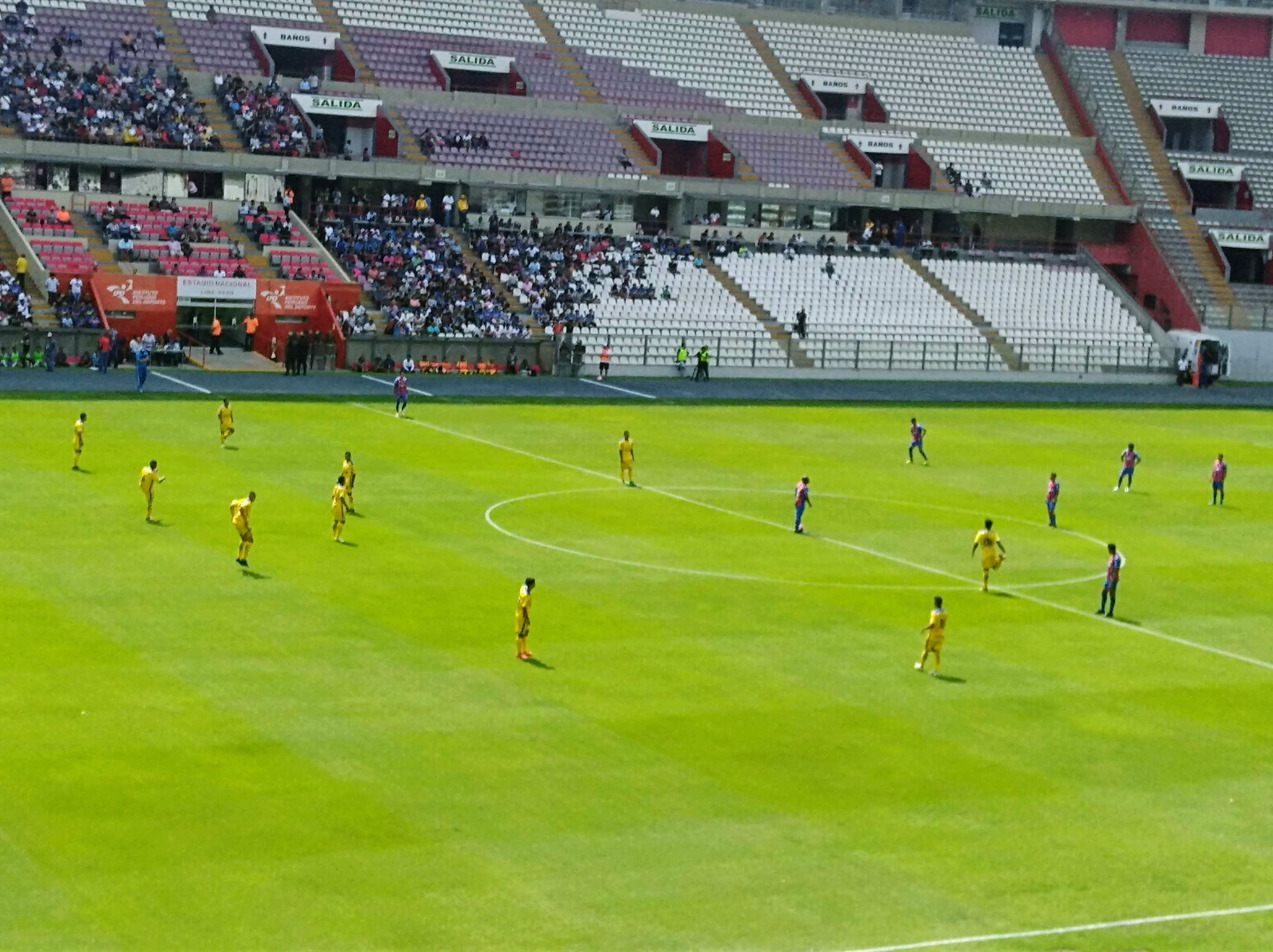
Moments before the start of the game between Santos FC and Alianza Universidad at Estadio Nacional

The final group stage, colloquially known as La Finalísima, will be played by the four semifinalist at the Estadio Nacional. The team with the most points will be declared the winner and be promoted to the 2019 Torneo Descentralizado.

Pos	Team	Pld	W	D	L	GF	GA	GD	Pts	Qualification
1	Pirata	3	2	0	1	11	3	+8	6	2019 Liga 1
2	Alianza Universidad	3	2	0	1	8	4	+4	6	Promotion Play-off
3	Santos	3	1	0	2	5	10	−5	3	Promotion Play-off
4	UDA	3	1	0	2	2	9	−7	3	

Source: Dechalaca.com
Rules for classification: 1) points; 2) goal difference; 3) goals scored; 4) draw.

==== Results ====
===== Round 1 =====
24 November 2018	Pirata	4–0	Santos	Estadio Miguel Grau, Callao
13:30 PET (UTC-05:00)	Valera 9', 58'; Ramírez 65'; Damián 77'	Report		Referee: Miguel Santiváñez

24 November 2018	Alianza Universidad	0–1	UDA	Estadio Miguel Grau, Callao
15:30 PET (UTC-05:00)		Report	Cisneros 45+1'	Referee: Diego Haro

===== Round 2 =====
28 November 2018	Pirata	1–3	Alianza Universidad	Estadio Miguel Grau, Callao
13:30 PET (UTC-05:00)	Echeandía 58'	Report	Trujillo 37', 39'; Durán 55'	Referee: Kevin Ortega

28 November 2018	Santos	3–1	UDA	Estadio Miguel Grau, Callao
15:30 PET (UTC-05:00)	Barrios 1', 48'; Reyes 74'	Report	Taipe 82'	Referee: Augusto Menéndez

===== Round 3 =====
2 December 2018	Santos	2–5	Alianza Universidad	Estadio Nacional, Lima
14:00 PET (UTC-05:00)	Romero 45+1'; Reyes 47'	Report	Sernaqué 17', 33'; Cunya 50'; Sernaqué 68', 90'	Referee: Joel Alarcón

2 December 2018	Pirata	6–0	UDA	Estadio Nacional, Lima
16:00 PET (UTC-05:00)	Vásquez 5'; Valera 43', 45'; Serrato 71'; Perleche 78', 80'	Report		Referee: Diego Haro

== Promotion play-off ==
Pos	Team	Pld	W	D	L	GF	GA	GD	Pts	Qualification
1	Carlos A. Mannucci	3	2	1	0	5	3	+2	7	2019 Liga 1
2	Alianza Universidad	3	1	2	0	5	3	+2	5	2019 Liga 1
3	Cienciano	3	1	1	1	4	4	0	4	2019 Liga 2
4	Santos	3	0	0	3	3	7	−4	0	2019 Liga 2

Rules for classification: 1) points; 2) goal difference; 3) goals scored; 4) draw.

== See also ==
- 2018 Torneo Descentralizado
- 2018 Peruvian Segunda División
- 2018 in Peruvian football
