= Unión Deportivo Parachique =

UDP
- Full name: Club Unión Deportivo Parachique
- Founded: February 2, 1962
- Ground: Estadio Sesquicentenario, Zarumilla
- League: Copa Perú
Home colours	Away colours

Club Unión Deportivo Parachique (sometimes referred as UDP) is a Peruvian football club, playing in the city of Sechura, Piura, Peru.

== History ==
The Club Unión Deportivo Parachique was founded on February 2, 1962.

In the 2015 Copa Perú, the club qualified to the Departamental Stage, but was eliminated by La Bocana in the Semifinals.

In the 2018 Copa Perú, the club qualified to the National Stage, but was eliminated when it finished in 28th place.

In the 2021 Copa Perú, the club qualified to the National Stage, but was eliminated when it finished in 7th place.

== Honours ==
=== Regional ===
- Liga Departamental de Piura:

Runner-up (1): 2018

- Liga Provincial de Sechura:

Winners (3): 2015, 2017, 2018

- Liga Distrital de Sechura:

Winners (4): 2015, 2016, 2017, 2018
Runner-up (3): 2014, 2019, 2023

== See also ==
- List of football clubs in Peru
- Peruvian football league system
