= MINSA FBC =

MINSA
- Full name: MINSA FBC
- Founded: August 6, 1996; 29 years ago
- Ground: IPD de Puerto Maldonado, Puerto Maldonado
- Capacity: 2,000
- League: Copa Perú
Home colours

MINSA FBC (sometimes referred as MINSA) is a Peruvian football club, playing in the province of Tambopata, Madre de Dios, Peru.

== History ==
The MINSA FBC was founded on August 6, 1996. The club has participated regularly in the Copa Perú, reaching the National Stage several times.

In 2013 and 2014, MINSA FBC qualified for the National Stage but was eliminated in the group stage.

In 2015 and 2016, the club again reached the National Stage but was eliminated in the Repechage by Juventud Barrio Nuevo and Credicoop San Román, respectively.

n 2017 and 2018, MINSA FBC qualified for the National Stage but finished 43rd and 42nd, respectively, and were eliminated from the competition.

== Coach ==
- (Peru) Jorge Machuca (2012-2013)

== Honours ==
=== Regional ===
- Liga Departamental de Madre de Dios:

Winners (8): 2006, 2007, 2009, 2011, 2012, 2014, 2015, 2016
Runner-up (5): 2008, 2010, 2013, 2017, 2018

- Liga Provincial de Tambopata:

Winners (7): 2009, 2010, 2014, 2015, 2016, 2018
Runner-up (2): 2011, 2017

- Liga Distrital de Tambopata:

Winners (2): 2015, 2018
Runner-up (5): 2010, 2011, 2014, 2016, 2017

== See also ==
- List of football clubs in Peru
- Peruvian football league system
