= 2017 Copa Perú =

Copa Perú
- Season: 2017
- Champions: Binacional

The 2017 Peru Cup season (Spanish: Copa Perú 2017), the largest amateur tournament of Peruvian football, started in February.

This edition has featured a change, with the elimination of the Regional Stage and the inclusion of participants from all the Regions of Peru in the National Stage. Under the new format, the tournament has four stages.

The creator of this format is the Chilean Leandro A. Shara

The 2017 Peru Cup started with the District Stage (Spanish: Etapa Distrital) in February. The next stage was the Provincial Stage (Spanish: Etapa Provincial) which started in June. The tournament continued with the Departmental Stage (Spanish: Etapa Departamental) in July. The National Stage (Spanish: Etapa Nacional) starts in September. The winner of the National Stage will be promoted to the First Division and the runner-up will be promoted to the Second Division.

== Departmental stage ==
Departmental Stage: 2017 Ligas Departamentales del Peru and 2017 Ligas Superiores del Perú

The following list shows the teams that qualified for the National Stage.

| Department | Team | Location |
|---|---|---|
| Amazonas | Unión Santo Domingo | Chachapoyas |
| Amazonas | Sachapuyos | Chachapoyas |
| Ancash | José Gálvez | Chimbote |
| Ancash | Alianza Vicos | Marcará |
| Apurímac | José María Arguedas | Andahuaylas |
| Apurímac | Miguel Grau | Abancay |
| Arequipa | Binacional | Arequipa |
| Arequipa | Sportivo Huracán | Arequipa |
| Ayacucho | Los Audaces de Mayapo | Llochegua |
| Ayacucho | Player Villafuerte | Huanta |
| Cajamarca | Real JL | Cajamarca |
| Cajamarca | Las Palmas | Chota |
| Callao | Sport Callao | Callao |
| Callao | Deportivo Yurimaguas | Ventanilla |
| Cusco | Deportivo Garcilaso | Cusco |
| Cusco | Deportivo Municipal (Quillabamba) | La Convención |
| Huancavelica | Diablos Rojos | Huancavelica |
| Huancavelica | FC Huayrapata | Angaraes |
| Huánuco | Alianza Universidad | Huánuco |
| Huánuco | León de Huánuco | Huánuco |
| Ica | Unión San Martín | Pisco |
| Ica | Parada de los Amigos | Grocio Prado |
| Junín | ADT | Tarma |
| Junín | Sport La Vid | Junín |
| La Libertad | El Inca | Virú |
| La Libertad | Alfonso Ugarte de Chiclín | Trujillo |

| Department | Team | Location |
|---|---|---|
| Lambayeque | Juan Aurich Pastor | Ferreñafe |
| Lambayeque | Carlos Stein | Chiclayo |
| Lima | Defensor Laure Sur | Huaral |
| Lima | Somos Olímpico | Surco |
| Loreto | Estudiantil CNI | Maynas |
| Loreto | Kola San Martín | Punchana |
| Madre de Dios | Deportivo Maldonado | Puerto Maldonado |
| Madre de Dios | MINSA | Tambopata |
| Moquegua | Credicoop San Cristóbal | Samegua |
| Moquegua | Atlético Huracán | Moquegua |
| Pasco | Deportivo Municipal (Yanahuanca) | Daniel Alcides Carrion |
| Pasco | Alipio Ponce | Pasco |
| Piura | Atlético Grau | Piura |
| Piura | Asociación Torino | Talara |
| Puno | Alfonso Ugarte | Puno |
| Puno | SIEN Carabaya | Carabaya |
| San Martín | Saposoa | Huallaga |
| San Martín | José Carlos Mariátegui | Picota |
| Tacna | Coronel Bolognesi | Tacna |
| Tacna | Mariscal Miller | Tacna |
| Tumbes | Independiente Aguas Verdes | Zarumilla |
| Tumbes | Sport El Tablazo | Tumbes |
| Ucayali | Comandante Alvariño | Coronel Portillo |
| Ucayali | Defensor San Alejandro | Irázola |

== National stage ==
In 2015 the National Stage has grown to 50 teams, and the new National Stage, designed by matchVision, is played under Regional using the POT System, with all the Regions of Peru will have represented. The National Stage starts in the first week of September.

In 2017 the same format continues, without the authorization of MatchVision.

This phase features the 50 teams that qualified from the Departmental Stage. Each team plays 3 games at home and 3 games away, for a total of 6 games against 3 different geographical rivals. The departmental stage winners only play against departmental runners-up, and vice versa. All the teams are positioned in one general table. After 6 matches, the team in places 1 to 8 are qualified directly to the Round of 16, while the teams in places 9 to 24 will play the Repechage phase. The teams in places 25 to 50 are eliminated.

The winner of the National Stage will be promoted to the 2018 Torneo Descentralizado and the runner-up of the National Stage will be promoted to the 2018 Peruvian Segunda División.

=== Tie-breaking criteria ===
The ranking of teams in the Unique Table is based on the following criteria:
1. Number of Points
3. Goal difference
4. Number of goals scored
5. Better performance in away matches based on the following criteria:
1. Number of Away Points
3. Goal Difference in away games
4. Number of goals scored in away games
6. Number of First-Half points: considering the half-time results as the final results
7. Drawing of lots

=== League table ===
| Pos | Team | Pld | W | D | L | GF | GA | GD | Pts | Qualification |
|---|---|---|---|---|---|---|---|---|---|---|
| 1 | Atlético Grau | 6 | 5 | 1 | 0 | 19 | 3 | +16 | 16 | Round of 16 |
| 2 | José María Arguedas | 6 | 5 | 0 | 1 | 14 | 3 | +11 | 15 | Round of 16 |
| 3 | Independiente Aguas Verdes | 6 | 5 | 0 | 1 | 19 | 11 | +8 | 15 | Round of 16 |
| 4 | Coronel Bolognesi | 6 | 4 | 2 | 0 | 10 | 2 | +8 | 14 | Round of 16 |
| 5 | Defensor Laure Sur | 6 | 4 | 1 | 1 | 14 | 7 | +7 | 13 | Round of 16 |
| 6 | José Gálvez | 6 | 4 | 1 | 1 | 13 | 6 | +7 | 13 | Round of 16 |
| 7 | Estudiantil CNI | 6 | 4 | 1 | 1 | 9 | 4 | +5 | 13 | Round of 16 |
| 8 | Diablos Rojos | 6 | 4 | 1 | 1 | 17 | 5 | +12 | 13 | Round of 16 |
| 9 | Las Palmas | 6 | 4 | 1 | 1 | 10 | 6 | +4 | 13 | Second round |
| 10 | Alianza Universidad | 6 | 4 | 1 | 1 | 8 | 3 | +5 | 13 | Second round |
| 11 | ADT | 6 | 4 | 1 | 1 | 12 | 5 | +7 | 13 | Second round |
| 12 | Binacional | 6 | 4 | 1 | 1 | 23 | 7 | +16 | 13 | Second round |
| 13 | Miguel Grau | 6 | 4 | 0 | 2 | 7 | 4 | +3 | 12 | Second round |
| 14 | Los Audaces de Mayapo | 6 | 4 | 0 | 2 | 14 | 8 | +6 | 12 | Second round |
| 15 | SIEN Carabaya | 6 | 4 | 0 | 2 | 16 | 9 | +7 | 12 | Second round |
| 16 | Somos Olímpico | 6 | 4 | 0 | 2 | 11 | 8 | +3 | 12 | Second round |
| 17 | Carlos Stein | 6 | 4 | 0 | 2 | 11 | 8 | +3 | 12 | Second round |
| 18 | Alfonso Ugarte | 6 | 4 | 0 | 2 | 13 | 6 | +7 | 12 | Second round |
| 19 | José Carlos Mariátegui | 6 | 4 | 0 | 2 | 14 | 9 | +5 | 12 | Second round |
| 20 | Sport La Vid | 6 | 3 | 2 | 1 | 10 | 7 | +3 | 11 | Second round |
| 21 | León de Huánuco | 6 | 3 | 2 | 1 | 11 | 8 | +3 | 11 | Second round |
| 22 | Unión San Martín | 6 | 3 | 2 | 1 | 8 | 5 | +3 | 11 | Second round |
| 23 | Juan Aurich Pastor | 6 | 3 | 1 | 2 | 12 | 7 | +5 | 10 | Second round |
| 24 | Credicoop San Cristóbal | 6 | 3 | 1 | 2 | 11 | 9 | +2 | 10 | Second round |
| 25 | Deportivo Garcilaso | 6 | 3 | 1 | 2 | 14 | 5 | +9 | 10 | Ligas Distritales |
| 26 | Parada de los Amigos | 6 | 3 | 1 | 2 | 11 | 7 | +4 | 10 | Ligas Distritales |
| 27 | Sachapuyos | 6 | 3 | 0 | 3 | 9 | 11 | −2 | 9 | Ligas Distritales |
| 28 | Sportivo Huracán | 6 | 2 | 2 | 2 | 6 | 8 | −2 | 8 | Ligas Distritales |
| 29 | Alfonso Ugarte de Chiclín | 6 | 2 | 2 | 2 | 11 | 9 | +2 | 8 | Ligas Distritales |
| 30 | Comandante Alvariño | 6 | 2 | 2 | 2 | 10 | 7 | +3 | 8 | Ligas Distritales |
| 31 | Kola San Martín | 6 | 2 | 1 | 3 | 7 | 11 | −4 | 7 | Ligas Distritales |
| 32 | Unión Santo Domingo | 6 | 2 | 1 | 3 | 11 | 7 | +4 | 7 | Ligas Distritales |
| 33 | Player Villafuerte | 6 | 2 | 0 | 4 | 6 | 18 | −12 | 6 | Ligas Distritales |
| 34 | Defensor San Alejandro | 6 | 2 | 0 | 4 | 6 | 9 | −3 | 6 | Ligas Distritales |
| 35 | Sport Callao | 6 | 1 | 2 | 3 | 6 | 8 | −2 | 5 | Ligas Distritales |
| 36 | Deportivo Municipal (Quillabamba) | 6 | 1 | 2 | 3 | 6 | 13 | −7 | 5 | Ligas Distritales |
| 37 | Alipio Ponce | 6 | 1 | 2 | 3 | 2 | 12 | −10 | 5 | Ligas Distritales |
| 38 | El Inca | 6 | 1 | 2 | 3 | 8 | 12 | −4 | 5 | Ligas Distritales |
| 39 | Asociación Torino | 6 | 1 | 1 | 4 | 5 | 10 | −5 | 4 | Ligas Distritales |
| 40 | Mariscal Miller | 6 | 1 | 1 | 4 | 7 | 20 | −13 | 4 | Ligas Distritales |
| 41 | Real JL | 6 | 1 | 1 | 4 | 6 | 10 | −4 | 4 | Ligas Distritales |
| 42 | Deportivo Maldonado | 6 | 1 | 1 | 4 | 12 | 18 | −6 | 4 | Ligas Distritales |
| 43 | MINSA | 6 | 1 | 0 | 5 | 6 | 23 | −17 | 3 | Ligas Distritales |
| 44 | Saposoa | 6 | 0 | 2 | 4 | 2 | 14 | −12 | 2 | Ligas Distritales |
| 45 | Deportivo Municipal (Yanahuanca) | 6 | 0 | 1 | 5 | 6 | 13 | −7 | 1 | Ligas Distritales |
| 46 | Atlético Huracán | 6 | 0 | 1 | 5 | 3 | 16 | −13 | 1 | Ligas Distritales |
| 47 | Sport El Tablazo | 6 | 0 | 1 | 5 | 7 | 27 | −20 | 1 | Ligas Distritales |
| 48 | Alianza Vicos | 6 | 0 | 1 | 5 | 4 | 14 | −10 | 1 | Ligas Distritales |
| 49 | Deportivo Yurimaguas | 6 | 0 | 1 | 5 | 2 | 14 | −12 | 1 | Ligas Distritales |
| 50 | FC Huayrapata | 6 | 0 | 0 | 6 | 5 | 18 | −13 | 0 | Ligas Distritales |

Updated to match(es) played on 2017. Source: ADFP-SD - official site
Rules for classification: 1) points; 2) goal difference; 3) number of goals scored; 4) head-to-head record; 5) drawing of lots

==== Round 1 ====
| Team 1 | Score | Team 2 |
|---|---|---|
| Binacional | 7–2 | Mariscal Miller |
| Alianza Universidad | 1–0 | Defensor San Alejandro |
| Deportivo Garcilaso | 6–0 | MINSA |
| Comandante Alvariño | 1–1 | Kola San Martín |
| Real JL | 4–1 | Sachapuyos |
| Juan Aurich Pastor | 1–0 | Asociación Torino |
| Yurimaguas | 0–1 | Parada de los Amigos |
| Atlético Grau | 5–0 | Sport El Tablazo |
| José Carlos Mariategui | 3–2 | Alfonso Ugarte de Chiclín |
| Credicoop San Cristóbal | 3–2 | SIEN Carabaya |
| Coronel Bolognesi | 1–0 | Atlético Huracán |
| José María Arguedas | 1–0 | Player Villafuerte |
| Deportivo Municipal (Yanahuanca) | 0–3 | León de Huánuco |
| Deportivo Maldonado | 1–1 | Deportivo Municipal (Quillabamba) |
| Los Audaces de Mayapo | 1–0 | Miguel Grau |
| Alfonso Ugarte | 1–2 | Sportivo Huracán |
| ADT | 4–0 | Alipio Ponce |
| Unión San Martín | 1–0 | FC Huayrapata |
| Estudiantil CNI | 0–0 | Saposoa |
| José Gálvez | 3–0 | Somos Olímpico |
| Defensor Laure Sur | 2–0 | Sport Callao |
| El Inca | 2–2 | Alianza Vicos |
| Independiente Aguas Verdes | 4–3 | Carlos Stein |
| Diablos Rojos | 2–1 | Sport La Vid |
| Unión Santo Domingo | 2–1 | Las Palmas |

==== Round 2 ====
| Team 1 | Score | Team 2 |
|---|---|---|
| Mariscal Miller | 2–0 | Credicoop San Cristóbal |
| Sportivo Huracán | 1–1 | Coronel Bolognesi |
| Defensor San Alejandro | 3–4 | Estudiantil CNI |
| MINSA | 0–1 | Alfonso Ugarte |
| Sachapuyos | 2–4 | Atlético Grau |
| Kola San Martín | 2–1 | José Carlos Mariátegui |
| Asociación Torino | 2–1 | Independiente Aguas Verdes |
| Parada de los Amigos | 2–3 | Los Audaces de Mayapo |
| Sport El Tablazo | 2–2 | Juan Aurich Pastor |
| Alfonso Ugarte de Chiclín | 2–2 | José Gálvez |
| SIEN Carabaya | 5–1 | Deportivo Maldonado |
| Atlético Huracán | 0–6 | Binacional |
| Player Villafuerte | 1–0 | Diablos Rojos |
| León de Huánuco | 1–1 | Comandante Alvariño |
| Deportivo Municipal (Quillabamba) | 0–1 | José María Arguedas |
| Miguel Grau | 2–1 | Deportivo Garcilaso |
| Alipio Ponce | 1–1 | Defensor Laure Sur |
| FC Huayrapata | 1–4 | ADT |
| Saposoa | 1–1 | Unión Santo Domingo |
| Somos Olímpico | 2–0 | Yurimaguas |
| Sport Callao | 1–1 | Unión San Martín |
| Alianza Vicos | 0–2 | Alianza Universidad |
| Carlos Stein | 2–1 | Real JL |
| Sport La Vid | 3–2 | Deportivo Municipal (Yanahuanca) |
| Las Palmas | 3–1 | El Inca |

==== Round 3 ====
| Team 1 | Score | Team 2 |
|---|---|---|
| Binacional | 2–2 | Sportivo Huracán |
| Alianza Universidad | 1–1 | León de Huánuco |
| Deportivo Garcilaso | 1–0 | Deportivo Municipal (Quillabamba) |
| Comandante Alvariño | 1–2 | Defensor San Alejandro |
| Real JL | 1–2 | Las Palmas |
| Juan Aurich Pastor | 3–0 | Carlos Stein |
| Yurimaguas | 1–1 | Sport Callao |
| Atlético Grau | 1–1 | Asociación Torino |
| José Carlos Mariategui | 2–1 | Saposoa |
| Credicoop San Cristóbal | 2–0 | Atlético Huracán |
| Coronel Bolognesi | 1–1 | Mariscal Miller |
| José María Arguedas | 2–0 | Miguel Grau |
| Deportivo Municipal (Yanahuanca) | 0–1 | Alipio Ponce |
| Deportivo Maldonado | 4–1 | MINSA |
| Los Audaces de Mayapo | 6–0 | Player Villafuerte |
| Alfonso Ugarte | 4–1 | SIEN Carabaya |
| ADT | 1–1 | Sport La Vid |
| Unión San Martín | 0–0 | Parada de los Amigos |
| Estudiantil CNI | 0–1 | Kola San Martín |
| José Gálvez | 2–0 | Alianza Vicos |
| Defensor Laure Sur | 2–1 | Somos Olímpico |
| El Inca | 0–3 | Alfonso Ugarte de Chiclín |
| Independiente Aguas Verdes | 3–1 | Sport El Tablazo |
| Diablos Rojos | 4–0 | FC Huayrapata |
| Unión Santo Domingo | 1–2 | Sachapuyos |

==== Round 4 ====
| Team 1 | Score | Team 2 |
|---|---|---|
| Mariscal Miller | 0–2 | Coronel Bolognesi |
| Defensor San Alejandro | 1–0 | Comandante Alvariño |
| MINSA | 5–3 | Deportivo Maldonado |
| Sachapuyos | 1–0 | Unión Santo Domingo |
| Kola San Martín | 0–1 | Estudiantil CNI |
| Asociación Torino | 0–2 | Atlético Grau |
| Parada de los Amigos | 2–1 | Unión San Martín |
| Sport El Tablazo | 3–7 | Independiente Aguas Verdes |
| Alfonso Ugarte de Chiclín | 1–1 | El Inca |
| SIEN Carabaya | 3–0 | Alfonso Ugarte |
| Atlético Huracán | 2–2 | Credicoop San Cristóbal |
| Player Villafuerte | 3–1 | Los Audaces de Mayapo |
| León de Huánuco | 2–0 | Alianza Universidad |
| Deportivo Municipal (Quillabamba) | 2–2 | Deportivo Garcilaso |
| Miguel Grau | 2–0 | José María Arguedas |
| Sportivo Huracán | 1–0 | Binacional |
| Alipio Ponce | 2–2 | Deportivo Municipal (Yanahuanca) |
| FC Huayrapata | 1–4 | Diablos Rojos |
| Saposoa | 0–2 | José Carlos Mariategui |
| Somos Olímpico | 3–1 | Defensor Laure Sur |
| Sport Callao | 2–0 | Yurimaguas |
| Alianza Vicos | 1–3 | José Gálvez |
| Carlos Stein | 1–0 | Juan Aurich Pastor |
| Sport La Vid | 2–0 | ADT |
| Las Palmas | 0–0 | Real JL |

==== Round 5 ====
| Team 1 | Score | Team 2 |
|---|---|---|
| Binacional | 3–1 | Atlético Huracán |
| Alianza Universidad | 2–0 | Alianza Vicos |
| Deportivo Garcilaso | 0–1 | Miguel Grau |
| Comandante Alvariño | 4–1 | León de Huánuco |
| Real JL | 0–2 | Carlos Stein |
| Juan Aurich Pastor | 5–1 | Sport El Tablazo |
| Yurimaguas | 1–3 | Somos Olímpico |
| Atlético Grau | 2–0 | Sachapuyos |
| José Carlos Mariategui | 5–2 | Kola San Martín |
| Credicoop San Cristóbal | 5–1 | Mariscal Miller |
| Coronel Bolognesi | 2–0 | Sportivo Huracán |
| José María Arguedas | 6–0 | Deportivo Municipal (Quillabamba) |
| Deportivo Municipal (Yanahuanca) | 1–2 | Sport La Vid |
| Deportivo Maldonado | 1–3 | SIEN Carabaya |
| Los Audaces de Mayapo | 3–1 | Parada de los Amigos |
| Alfonso Ugarte | 5–0 | MINSA |
| ADT | 3–0 | FC Huayrapata |
| Unión San Martín | 1–0 | Sport Callao |
| Estudiantil CNI | 1–0 | Defensor San Alejandro |
| José Gálvez | 2–1 | Alfonso Ugarte de Chiclín |
| Defensor Laure Sur | 5–0 | Alipio Ponce |
| El Inca | 1–2 | Las Palmas |
| Independiente Aguas Verdes | 2–1 | Asociación Torino |
| Diablos Rojos | 5–1 | Player Villafuerte |
| Unión Santo Domingo | 6–0 | Saposoa |

==== Round 6 ====
| Team 1 | Score | Team 2 |
|---|---|---|
| Mariscal Miller | 1–5 | Binacional |
| Defensor San Alejandro | 0–2 | Alianza Universidad |
| MINSA | 0–4 | Deportivo Garcilaso |
| Kola San Martín | 1–3 | Comandante Alvariño |
| Sachapuyos | 3–0 | Real JL |
| Asociación Torino | 3–1 | Juan Aurich Pastor |
| Parada de los Amigos | 5–0 | Yurimaguas |
| Sport El Tablazo | 0–5 | Atlético Grau |
| Alfonso Ugarte de Chiclín | 2–1 | José Carlos Mariategui |
| SIEN Carabaya | 2–0 | Credicoop San Cristóbal |
| Atlético Huracán | 0–3 | Coronel Bolognesi |
| Player Villafuerte | 1–4 | José María Arguedas |
| León de Huánuco | 3–1 | Deportivo Municipal (Yanahuanca) |
| Deportivo Municipal (Quillabamba) | 3–2 | Deportivo Maldonado |
| Miguel Grau | 2–0 | Los Audaces de Mayapo |
| Sportivo Huracán | 0–2 | Alfonso Ugarte |
| Alipio Ponce | 0–2 | ADT |
| FC Huayrapata | 0–3 | Unión San Martín |
| Saposoa | 0–3 | Estudiantil CNI |
| Somos Olímpico | 2–1 | José Gálvez |
| Sport Callao | 2–3 | Defensor Laure Sur |
| Alianza Vicos | 1–3 | El Inca |
| Carlos Stein | 3–0 | Independiente Aguas Verdes |
| Sport La Vid | 1–1 | Diablos Rojos |
| Las Palmas | 2–1 | Unión Santo Domingo |

=== Second round ===
| Team 1 | Agg. | Team 2 | 1st leg | 2nd leg |
|---|---|---|---|---|
| Credicoop San Cristóbal | 1–4 | Las Palmas | 1–2 | 0–2 |
| Juan Aurich Pastor | 5–2 | Alianza Universidad | 2–2 | 3–0 |
| Unión San Martín | 2–1 | ADT | 1–0 | 1–1 |
| León de Huánuco | 2–11 | Binacional | 1–3 | 1–8 |
| Sport La Vid (a) | 3–3 | Miguel Grau | 2–0 | 1–3 |
| José Carlos Mariátegui | 5–4 | Los Audaces de Mayapo | 2–0 | 3–4 |
| SIEN Carabaya | 3–9 | Alfonso Ugarte | 2–4 | 1–5 |
| Somos Olímpico | 0–5 | Carlos Stein | 0–1 | 0–4 |

=== Bracket ===
Round of 16
1 | Atlético Grau | 2 | 1 | 3
17 | Carlos Stein | 1 | 1 | 2
2 | José María Arguedas (s) | 0 | 3 | 3
18 | Alfonso Ugarte | 3 | 0 | 3
3 | Independiente Aguas Verdes | 0 | 3 | 3
19 | José Carlos Mariátegui (a) | 2 | 1 | 3
4 | Coronel Bolognesi (s) | 1 | 1 | 2
20 | Sport La Vid | 1 | 1 | 2
5 | Defensor Laure Sur | 0 | 2 | 2
12 | Binacional | 4 | 1 | 5
6 | José Gálvez | 0 | 1 | 1
22 | Unión San Martín | 2 | 1 | 3
7 | Estudiantil CNI | 0 | 2 | 2
23 | Juan Aurich Pastor | 1 | 0 | 1
8 | Diablos Rojos | 0 | 0 | 0
9 | Las Palmas | 1 | 4 | 5

Quarterfinals
1 | Atlético Grau (s) | 0 | 4 | 4
2 | José María Arguedas | 4 | 0 | 4
19 | José Carlos Mariátegui | 1 | 4 | 5
4 | Coronel Bolognesi | 2 | 0 | 2
12 | Binacional | 1 | 4 | 5
22 | Unión San Martín | 1 | 1 | 2
7 | Estudiantil CNI (a) | 2 | 1 | 3
9 | Las Palmas | 3 | 0 | 3

Semifinals
Atlético Grau
José Carlos Mariátegui
Binacional
Estudiantil CNI

Champion & Runner-up
Atlético Grau
Binacional

=== Round of 16 ===
| Team 1 | Agg. | Team 2 | 1st leg | 2nd leg |
|---|---|---|---|---|
| Carlos Stein | 2–3 | Atlético Grau | 1–2 | 1–1 |
| Alfonso Ugarte | 3–3 | José María Arguedas (s) | 3–0 | 0–3 |
| José Carlos Mariátegui (a) | 3–3 | Independiente Aguas Verdes | 2–0 | 1–3 |
| Sport La Vid | 2–2 | Coronel Bolognesi (s) | 1–1 | 1–1 |
| Binacional | 5–2 | Defensor Laure Sur | 4–0 | 1–2 |
| Unión San Martín | 3–1 | José Gálvez | 2–0 | 1–1 |
| Juan Aurich Pastor | 1–2 | Estudiantil CNI | 1–0 | 0–2 |
| Diablos Rojos | 0–5 | Las Palmas | 0–1 | 0–4 |

=== Quarterfinals ===
| Team 1 | Agg. | Team 2 | 1st leg | 2nd leg |
|---|---|---|---|---|
| José María Arguedas | 4–4 | Atlético Grau (s) | 4–0 | 0–4 |
| Coronel Bolognesi | 2–5 | José Carlos Mariátegui | 2–1 | 0–4 |
| Unión San Martín | 2–5 | Binacional | 1–1 | 1–4 |
| Las Palmas | 3–3 | Estudiantil CNI (a) | 3–2 | 0–1 |

=== Final group stage ===
The final group stage, colloquially known as La Finalísima, will be played by the four semifinalist at the Estadio Iván Elías Moreno in the Villa El Salvador district of Lima with the last two games played at the Estadio Nacional. The team with the most points will be declared the winner and be promoted to the 2018 Torneo Descentralizado. The runner-up will be promoted to the 2018 Peruvian Segunda División. The draw for this stage of the tournament took place on 28 November 2017 at the Peruvian Football Federation's headquarters.

| Pos | Team | Pld | W | D | L | GF | GA | GD | Pts | Qualification |
|---|---|---|---|---|---|---|---|---|---|---|
| 1 | Binacional (C) | 3 | 2 | 1 | 0 | 6 | 1 | +5 | 7 | 2018 Torneo Descentralizado |
| 2 | Atlético Grau | 3 | 2 | 1 | 0 | 5 | 2 | +3 | 7 | 2018 Segunda División |
| 3 | Estudiantil CNI | 3 | 1 | 0 | 2 | 2 | 5 | −3 | 3 | |
| 4 | José Carlos Mariátegui | 3 | 0 | 0 | 3 | 4 | 9 | −5 | 0 | |

Source: Dechalaca.com
Rules for classification: 1) points; 2) goal difference; 3) goals scored; 4) draw.
(C) Champions

==== Round 1 ====
| 3 December 2017 | Binacional | 4–1 | José Carlos Mariátegui | Estadio Iván Elías Moreno, Lima |
| 13:30 PET (UTC-05:00) | Polar 44'; Crespo 59'; Durán 68'; Durán 90+3' | Report | Gálvez 45+8' (pen.) | Referee: Edwin Ordóñez |

| 3 December 2017 | Atlético Grau | 2–0 | Estudiantil CNI | Estadio Iván Elías Moreno, Lima |
| 15:30 PET (UTC-05:00) | Martínez 67'; Panta 89' | Report | | Referee: Diego Jaimes |

==== Round 2 ====
| 6 December 2017 | José Carlos Mariátegui | 1–2 | Estudiantil CNI | Estadio Iván Elías Moreno, Lima |
| 13:30 PET (UTC-05:00) | Peña 33' | | Quicube 3'; Cenepo 77' |

| 6 December 2017 | Binacional | 0–0 | Atlético Grau | Estadio Iván Elías Moreno, Lima |
| 15:30 PET (UTC-05:00) |

==== Round 3 ====
| 10 December 2017 | Atlético Grau | 3–2 | José Carlos Mariátegui | Estadio Nacional, Lima |
| 14:00 PET (UTC-05:00) | Ortiz 64'; Ortiz 68'; Vásquez 84' | | Cárdenas 78'; Cárdenas 90+2' | Attendance: 8,110; Referee: Hibert Villegas |

| 10 December 2017 | Binacional | 2–0 | Estudiantil CNI | Estadio Nacional, Lima |
| 16:00 PET (UTC-05:00) | Carnero 40'; Torres 90+1' | | | Attendance: 8,110 |

== See also ==
- 2017 Torneo Descentralizado
- 2017 Peruvian Segunda División
- 2017 in Peruvian football
