= Club Deportivo Boca Juniors =

Peruvian football club

Boca Juniors
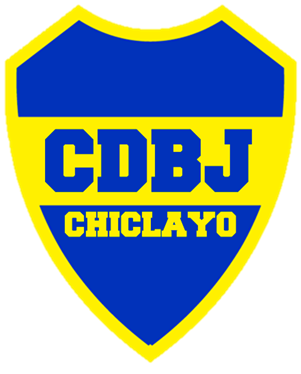
- Full name: Club Deportivo Boca Juniors
- Founded: December 31, 1926
- Ground: Elías Aguirre, Chiclayo
- Capacity: 25,000
- League: Copa Perú
Home colours

Club Deportivo Boca Juniors (sometimes referred to as Boca Juniors de Chiclayo) is a Peruvian football club, founded in the city of Chiclayo, Lambayeque, Peru.

== History ==
The Club Deportivo Boca Juniors was founded on December 31, 1926. The club was named in honor of the Argentine sports club Boca Juniors.

== Rivalries ==
Boca Juniors has had a long-standing rivalry with the local club San Lorenzo de Almagro.

== Honours ==
=== Regional ===
- Liga Departamental de Lambayeque:

Winners (2): 1976, 1994

- Liga Provincial de Chiclayo:

Winners (3): 1976, 1994, 2022

- Liga Distrital de Chiclayo:

Winners (20): 1935, 1941, 1942, 1950, 1951, 1952, 1957, 1958, 1961, 1962, 1963, 1964, 1965, 1976, 1983, 1994, 2022, 2023, 2024
Runner-up (3): 1960, 1966, 2026

== See also ==
- List of football clubs in Peru
- Peruvian football league system
