= 1969 Copa Perú =

Copa Perú
- Season: 1969
- Champions: Carlos A. Mannucci
- Matches: 15
- Goals: 47 (3.13 per match)
- Top goalscorer: Oscar Herrera (6)
- Highest scoring: Carlos A. Mannucci 8–0 Salesianos; Only National Stage taken into consideration

The 1969 Copa Perú season (Spanish: Copa Perú 1969), the promotion tournament of Peruvian football.

In this tournament, after many qualification rounds, each one of the 24 departments in which Peru is politically divided qualified a team. Those teams, plus the team relegated from First Division on the last year, enter in two more rounds and finally 6 of them qualify for the Final round, staged in Lima (the capital).

The champion, Carlos A. Mannucci, was promoted to play in 1969 Torneo Descentralizado.

== Departmental stage ==
The following list shows the teams that qualified for the Regional Stage.

Department	Team	Location
Amazonas	Universitario	Chachapoyas
Áncash	Juventud Bolívar	Casma
Arequipa	Melgar	Arequipa
Apurímac	Deportivo Bancario	Abancay
Ayacucho	Deportivo Arco	Ayacucho
Cajamarca	Deportivo Normal	Cajamarca
Cusco	Deportivo Garcilaso	Cusco
Huancavelica	UDA	Huancavelica
Huánuco	León de Huánuco	Huánuco
Ica	Víctor Bielich	Pisco
Junín	Unión Ocopilla	Junín
La Libertad	Alfonso Ugarte	Chiclín
La Libertad	Carlos A. Mannucci	Trujillo

Department	Team	Location
Lambayeque	San Lorenzo	Chiclayo
Lima	Social Huando	Huaral
Loreto	CNI	Iquitos
Madre De Dios	Mariscal Cáceres	Puerto Maldonado
Moquegua	Escuela Normal	Moquegua
Pasco	Centro Tarmeño	Cerro de Pasco
Piura	Alianza Atlético	Sullana
Puno	Salesianos	Puno
San Martín	Cultural Juanjuí	Juanjuí
Tacna	Mariscal Miller	Tacna
Tumbes	Húsares de Junín	Tumbes

== Regional stage ==
=== Region Norte A ===
Pos	Team	Pld	W	D	L	Pts	Qualification
1	San Lorenzo	6	4	1	1	9	Final stage
2	Alianza Atlético	6	3	3	0	9	
3	Húsares de Junín	5	1	1	3	3	
4	Deportivo Normal	5	0	1	4	1	

==== Tiebreaker ====
Team 1	Score	Team 2
San Lorenzo	3–1	Alianza Atlético

=== Region Norte B ===
Pos	Team	Pld	W	D	L	Pts	Qualification
1	Alfonso Ugarte de Chiclín	6	5	1	0	11	Final stage
2	León de Huánuco	6	3	1	2	7	
3	Juventud Bolívar	6	1	2	3	4	
4	Centro Tarmeño	6	0	2	4	2	

==== Final Regional ====
Team 1	Agg.	Team 2	1st leg	2nd leg
Alfonso Ugarte de Chiclín	1–3	Carlos A. Mannucci	0–1	1–2

=== Region Oriente ===
Pos	Team	Pld	W	D	L	Pts	Qualification
1	CNI	4	2	2	0	6	Final stage
2	Cultural Juanjuí	4	1	2	1	4	
3	Universitario	4	0	2	2	2	

=== Region Centro ===
Pos	Team	Pld	W	D	L	Pts	Qualification
1	Unión Ocopilla	6	4	1	1	9	Final stage
2	Social Huando	6	2	2	2	6	
3	Víctor Bielich	6	1	3	2	5	
4	UDA	6	1	2	3	4	

=== Region Sureste ===
Pos	Team	Pld	W	D	L	Pts	Qualification
1	Salesianos	4	4	0	0	8	Final stage
2	Deportivo Garcilaso	4	3	0	1	6	
3	Mariscal Cáceres	4	1	1	2	3	
4	Deportivo Arco	4	0	2	2	2	
5	Deportivo Bancario	4	0	1	3	1	

=== Region Sur ===
Pos	Team	Pld	W	D	L	GF	GA	GD	Pts	Qualification
1	Melgar	4	4	0	0	11	1	+10	8	Final stage
2	Mariscal Miller	4	1	1	2	5	10	−5	3	
3	Escuela Normal	4	0	1	3	3	8	−5	1	

== Final Stage ==
=== Standings ===
Pos	Team	Pld	W	D	L	GF	GA	GD	Pts	Promotion
1	Carlos A. Mannucci (C)	5	5	0	0	18	2	+16	10	1969 Primera División
2	Melgar	5	4	0	1	7	2	+5	8	
3	San Lorenzo	5	2	0	3	6	6	0	4	
4	CNI	5	1	1	3	7	9	−2	3	
5	Unión Ocopilla	5	1	1	3	5	11	−6	3	
6	Salesianos	5	1	0	4	4	17	−13	2	

(C) Champions

=== Results ===
==== Round 1 ====
27 April 1969	San Lorenzo	2–0	Salesianos	Nacional, Lima

27 April 1969	Melgar	3–0	Unión Ocopilla	Nacional, Lima

27 April 1969	Carlos A. Mannucci	4–1	CNI	Nacional, Lima

==== Round 2 ====
1 May 1969	Carlos A. Mannucci	8–0	Salesianos	Nacional, Lima

1 May 1969	Unión Ocopilla	2–1	San Lorenzo	Nacional, Lima

1 May 1969	Melgar	1–0	CNI	Nacional, Lima

==== Round 3 ====
4 May 1969	CNI	4–0	Salesianos	Nacional, Lima

4 May 1969	Melgar	1–0	San Lorenzo	Nacional, Lima

4 May 1969	Carlos A. Mannucci	1–0	Unión Ocopilla	Nacional, Lima

==== Round 4 ====
7 May 1969	CNI	2–2	Unión Ocopilla	Nacional, Lima

7 May 1969	Melgar	2–2	Salesianos	Nacional, Lima

7 May 1969	Carlos A. Mannucci	3–1	San Lorenzo	Nacional, Lima

==== Round 5 ====
11 May 1969	Salesianos	4–1	Unión Ocopilla	Nacional, Lima

11 May 1969	San Lorenzo	2–0	CNI	Nacional, Lima

11 May 1969	Carlos A. Mannucci	2–0	Melgar	Nacional, Lima
