= Alfonso Ugarte de Chiclín =

Alfonso Ugarte
- Full name: Club Alfonso Ugarte
- Nickname: Los Diablos Rojos
- Founded: August 1, 1917; 109 years ago
- Ground: Estadio Mansiche, Trujillo
- Capacity: 23,214
- Chairman: Marco Antonio Córdova
- Manager: Alfredo Larios
- League: Copa Perú
- 2017: National Stage
Home colours	Away colours

Alfonso Ugarte de Chiclín is a Peruvian football club, playing in the city of Trujillo, Peru. The club is the biggest of Trujillo city, and one of the biggest in La Libertad Province.

The club was founded 1 August 1917 and plays in the Copa Perú, which is the third division of the Peruvian league.

The club has a long rivalry with Carlos A. Mannucci, and matches between the two teams are known as "Classic Trujillano".

== History ==
=== Foundation ===
On August 1, 1917, the Alfonso Ugarte Club was founded at Hacienda Chiclín near Trujillo. No one could foretell that this small team would eventually star in a story in the Peruvian amateur football. With the passing of the years his success was made winning the sympathy and commitment of its people.

=== The Tour ===
In 1933, the club made its first appearance in Lima, facing Universitario de Deportes at the National Stadium. During that decade, it played several friendly matches in the capital against both domestic and foreign teams. In 1936, it faced the Argentine side Gimnasia y Esgrima de Ciudadela, narrowly losing 3–2. The following year, it drew 4–4 with Audax Italiano of Chile and defeated Brazil’s San Cristóbal 3–2, a team that had previously beaten both Alianza Lima and Universitario.

The nickname “Red Devils” originated on September 23, 1942, when the club defeated Inependiente de Avellaneda, the reigning Argentine champion at the time, by 2–1 in a friendly match played in Trujillo.

=== Invitation to the First Division ===
At the beginning of 1966, after being crowned champions of the Liga Distrital de Trujillo, the club received an invitation from the Peruvian Football Federation to participate in the inaugural edition of the Torneo Descentralizado, marking the beginning of the decentralized national championships.

On August 13 of that year, it became the first provincial club to play a match in the Peruvian Primera División, drawing 0–0 against Sporting Cristal. In this first experience in professional football, Alfonso Ugarte de Chiclín finished in 12th place out of 14 teams, and was subsequently required to compete in the Copa Perú, in accordance with the tournament regulations.

=== First Champion of the Copa Perú ===
The year following its relegation, the club began its participation in the 1967 Copa Perú by facing Sanjuanista, the departmental champion of La Libertad, whom they eliminated after a three-match series. After successfully advancing through the Regional Stage, the team qualified for the National Stage, whose final round was played in May.

In the final round-robin stage, the club was crowned champion after defeating CNI of Iquitos 3–2 in the last matchday, a result that allowed them to surpass Juan Aurich and Octavio Espinosa in the standings and secure their return to the top division of Peruvian football. The team was coached by Argentine manager Ángel Fernández Roca and usually lined up with Antonio Sanguinetto; Óscar Villalobos, Constante Mendoza, Erasmo Gamboa, Jorge Arce, José “Chicamero” Quispe, José Farías Negrini, José Dioses, Tito Salavarria, Raúl Carrión, Manuel “Meleque” Suárez, and Jorge Quipuzco. Other members of the squad included Carlos Vichera, Pedro Montero, and José Vergel, among others.

However, in the 1967 Torneo Descentralizado, the team failed to replicate its previous success and finished in last place, being relegated once again to the Liga Distrital de Trujillo, where it has remained ever since.

In 1980, after several years playing at the Mansiche Stadium, Alfonso Ugarte once again stood out by facing the departmental champion of Lambayeque, the “Los Aguerridos de Monsefú”, whom they defeated 3–1. The Lambayeque side would later go on to reach the final of that season’s Copa Perú.

== Statistics and results in First Division ==
=== League history ===
Season	Div.	Pos.	Pl.	W	D	L	GF	GA	P	Notes
1966	1st	12	26	7	3	16	28	60	17	12/14 Regular season
1967	1st	14	26	3	6	17	25	40	12	14/14 Regular season

== Honours ==
=== Senior titles ===
Keys

- Record
- ^{(s)} Shared record

Type	Competition	Titles	Runner-up	Winning years	Runner-up years
National (League)	Copa Perú	1	—	1967	—
Regional (League)	Región Norte B	2	—	1967, 1969	—
Regional (League)	Liga Departamental de La Libertad	4	5	1968, 1970, 1989, 1990	1971, 1978, 1995, 2017, 2023
Regional (League)	Liga Provincial de Trujillo	6	—	1978, 1981, 1989, 1995, 2017, 2023	—
Regional (League)	Liga Distrital de Trujillo	17	10	1948, 1958, 1959, 1960, 1964, 1965, 1968, 1969, 1970, 1971, 1975, 1978, 1981, 1989, 1995, 2017, 2025	1952, 1963, 1972, 1974, 1977, 1980, 1996, 2019, 2023, 2026
Regional (League)	Segunda División Distrital de Trujillo	1	—	1957	—

== See also ==
- List of football clubs in Peru
- Peruvian football league system
