= Inclán Sport Club =

Peruvian football club

Inclán Sport
- Full name: Inclán Sport Club
- Nickname(s): Los Campas; Albiverdes
- Founded: July 27, 1919; 105 years ago
- Ground: Estadio Municipal de Mollendo, Mollendo
- Capacity: 5,000
- League: Copa Perú
Home colours

Inclán Sport Club (sometimes referred as Inclán Sport) is a Peruvian football club, playing in the city of Mollendo, Arequipa, Peru.

== History ==
The Inclán Sport Club was founded on July 27, 1919.

In 2011 Copa Perú, the club qualified to the Departamental Stage, but was eliminated by Deportivo Estrella in the Second Stage.

In 2016 Copa Perú, the club qualified to the Departamental Stage, but was eliminated by Binacional in the First Stage.

In 2017 Copa Perú, the club qualified to the Departamental Stage, but was eliminated by Cerrito Los Libres in the First Stage.

== Honours ==
=== Regional ===
- Liga Departamental de Arequipa:

Winners (1): 1991

- Liga Provincial de Islay:

Winners (4): 1991, 1999, 2000, 2011
Runner-up (2): 2016, 2017

- Liga Distrital de Mollendo:

Winners (9): 1974, 1979, 1991, 1999, 2001, 2004, 2011, 2016, 2017
Runner-up (5): 2010, 2013, 2015, 2022, 2024

== See also ==
- List of football clubs in Peru
- Peruvian football league system
