= Ligas Distritales del Peru =

- Country: Peru
- Number of clubs: Variable
- Level on pyramid: 7
- Promotion to: Ligas Provinciales
- Relegation to: Segunda División Distrital

The Ligas Distritales del Peru are the Peruvian football lower divisions. They are administered by the Local Federations. The level immediately above are the Ligas Provinciales del Peru (Copa Perú).

The District Football Leagues of Peru are part of the Copa Perú. The district champions and runners-up advance to the Provincial Stage, where teams from the same province compete to be crowned provincial champions and runners-up. They then progress to the Departmental Tournaments, in which the qualified teams from each province face other teams from the same department to determine the departmental champion and runner-up. From there, they advance to the National Stage, where teams from all over Peru compete. The Copa Perú champion is promoted to the Liga 2, while the runner-up is promoted to the Liga 2 or Liga 3.

The following is a list of notable district football leagues in Peru sorted by region.

== Format ==
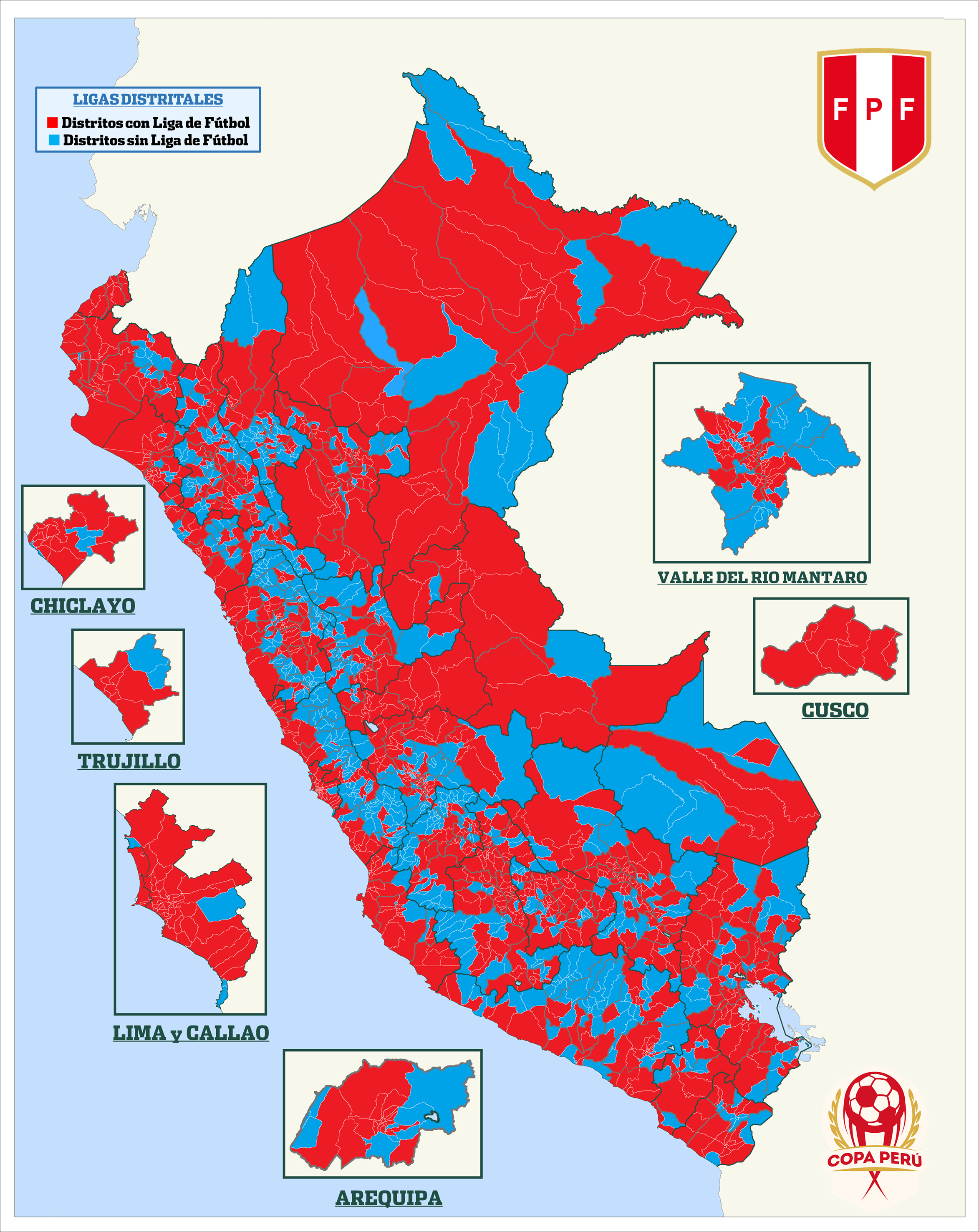
Districts with a district league in the tournament.

The tournament has 5 stages. The first stage of the tournament is the District Stage (Spanish: Etapa Distrital), played from February to May. Districts hold a small league tournament to determine its winners which will qualify for the next stage. The second stage is the Provincial Stage (Spanish: Etapa Provincial), played in June and July. The District winners play in groups and the winners qualify for the next stage. The third stage is the Departmental Stage (Spanish: Etapa Departamental), consisting of another league tournament, between July and September.

=== Stages ===
Level	Stage
4	Etapa Nacional (Copa Peru)
5	Ligas Departamentales
6	Ligas Provinciales
7	Ligas Distritales Primera División
8	Ligas Distritales Segunda División

== Amazonas ==
=== Liga Distrital de Bagua Grande ===
==== List of champions ====
Season	Champion	Runner-up
2011	Cruz Roja	Cultural San Luis
2012	Santa Rosa	Cruz Roja
2013	Bagua Grande	Cultural San Luis
2014	Bagua Grande	
2015	Bagua Grande	Sporting Victoria
2016	Mariano Santos	Sporting Victoria
2017	Bagua Grande	Sporting Victoria
2018	Bagua Grande	Santa Rosa
2019	Bagua Grande	Sporting Victoria
2020	Canceled due to the COVID-19 pandemic	
2021	Canceled due to the COVID-19 pandemic	
2022	Bagua Grande	Sport Pueblo Libre
2023	Mariano Santos	Bagua Grande
2024	Bagua Grande	Barza Sport
2025	Cultural Utcubamba	Bagua Grande
2026	Barza Sport	Deportivo CAFSAN

=== Liga Distrital de Chachapoyas ===
==== List of champions ====
Season	Champion	Runner-up
2009	Deportivo Hospital	Unión Santo Domingo
2010	Unión Santo Domingo	Higos Urco
2011	Unión Santo Domingo	Juventud Tushpuna
2012	Higos Urco	Sachapuyos
2013	Deportivo Hospital	Higos Urco
2014	Higos Urco	Unión Santo Domingo
2015	UPP	Deportivo Hospital
2016	Unión Santo Domingo	Higos Urco
2017	Sachapuyos	Unión Santo Domingo
2018	Sachapuyos	Alipio Ponce
2019	UNTRM	Sachapuyos
2020	Canceled due to the COVID-19 pandemic	
2021	Canceled due to the COVID-19 pandemic	
2022	Unión Santo Domingo	Sachapuyos
2023	Deportivo Municipal	FCM Pisuquia
2024	Deportivo Municipal	Amazonas FC
2025	Amazonas FC	Sachapuyos
2026	Juan Pablo II	Sachapuyos

== Áncash ==
=== Liga Distrital de Casma ===
==== List of champions ====
Season	Champion	Runner-up
1990	Racing	
1991	Cultural Casma	
1992	Cultural Casma	
1993	Barrionuevo	
1994	Juventud Indoamérica	
1995	Juventud Indoamérica	
1996	Magdalena	
1997	San Martín	
1998	Juventud Indoamérica	
1999	San Martín	
2000	Defensor San Rafael	
2001	Juventud Indoamérica	
2002	Juventud Indoamérica	
2003	Juventud Indoamérica	
2004	Cultural Casma	
2005	Cultural Casma	
2006	Cultural Casma	
2007	Cultural Casma	
2008	Cultural Casma	Juventud Indoamérica
2009	San Martín	Cultural Casma
2010	Cultural Casma	San Martín
2011	San Martín	DELUSA
2012	San Martín	DELUSA
2013	Juan Pablo II	DELUSA
2014	Juventud Indoamérica	San Martín
2015	DELUSA	Juan Pablo II
2016	Sport Inca	Miguel Grau
2017	Centro Unión Carrizal	DELUSA
2018	Centro Unión Carrizal	Sport Huaquilla Baja
2019	Sport Huaquilla Baja	Sport Inca
2020	Canceled due to the COVID-19 pandemic	
2021	Canceled due to the COVID-19 pandemic	
2022	Sport Inca	Sport Huaquilla Baja
2023	Magdalena CEDEC	Defensor San Rafael
2024	Sport Huaquilla Baja	Defensor San Rafael
2025	Centro Unión Carrizal	Deportivo FS Casma
2026	Centro Unión Carrizal	Miraflores FC

=== Liga Distrital de Chimbote ===
==== List of champions ====
Season	Champion	Runner-up
2004	José Gálvez	Unión Juventud
2005	Unión Juventud	
2006	Unión Juventud	
2007	Ovación Miraflores	
2008	Ovación Miraflores	Atlético Más que Vencedores
2009	Sider Perú	Academia Francisco Ríos
2010	Academia Francisco Ríos	Juventud La Unión
2011	Sport Cortina	Academia Francisco Ríos
2012	Unión Juventud	Unión Pesquero
2013	Universidad San Pedro	Sport Cortina
2014	Universidad San Pedro	Juventud José Balta
2015	Unión Juventud	Universidad San Pedro
2016	Deportivo Roma	José Gálvez
2017	Universidad San Pedro	José Gálvez
2018	Los Turrys	Deportivo Roma
2019	José Gálvez	Unión Juventud
2020	Canceled due to the COVID-19 pandemic	
2021	Canceled due to the COVID-19 pandemic	
2022	Unión Juventud	José Gálvez
2023	Unión Juventud	Ovación Miraflores
2024	José Gálvez Chimbote	Unión Juventud
2025	Juventud La Unión	José Gálvez
2026	José Gálvez	Academia Francisco Ríos

=== Liga Distrital de Huaraz ===
==== List of champions ====
Season	Champion	Runner-up
2000	Sport Áncash	
2001	Sport Áncash	
2002	Sport Rosario	Sport Áncash
2003	Sport Áncash	
2004	Sport Áncash	Sport Rosario
2008	Los Caballeros de La Ley	Huaraz FC
2009	Huaraz FC	UNASAM
2010	UNASAM	Deportivo AMVA
2011	Los Caballeros de La Ley	Huaraz FC
2012	Sport Rosario	Huaraz FC
2013	Real Shancayán	Sport Rosario
2014	Sport Rosario	Real Shancayán
2015	Sport Áncash	Furia Ancashina
2016	Sport Rosario	Los Caballeros de La Ley
2017	Unión Áncash	Juventud Huaraz
2018	Huaraz FC	Los Caballeros de La Ley
2019	Deportivo Amosa	Sport Áncash
2020	Canceled due to the COVID-19 pandemic	
2021	Canceled due to the COVID-19 pandemic	
2022	Rosario	Sport Áncash
2023	Los Caballeros de La Ley	Star Áncash
2024	Sport Áncash	Los Caballeros de La Ley
2025	Huaraz FC	Sporting Club Huaraz
2026	Sport Áncash	Huaraz FC

== Apurímac ==
=== Liga Distrital de Abancay ===
==== List of champions ====
Season	Champion	Runner-up
2001	Deportivo Educación	
2002	Miguel Grau	
2003	Deportivo Educación	
2004	Miguel Grau	
2005	Deportivo Educación	
2006	Deportivo Educación	
2007	Miguel Grau	
2008	Deportivo Educación	MINSA
2009	Deportivo Educación	Pueblo Libre
2010	Miguel Grau	Universitario UTEA
2011	Deportivo Educación	Miguel Grau
2012	Apurímac	La Victoria
2013	Universitario UTEA	Ingeniería Civil
2014	Miguel Grau	La Victoria
2015	Deportivo Educación	Miguel Grau
2016	La Victoria	Miguel Grau
2017	Universitario UTEA	Miguel Grau
2018	Universitario UTEA	FC Retamoso
2019	Deportivo Educación	Miguel Grau
2020	Canceled due to the COVID-19 pandemic	
2021	Canceled due to the COVID-19 pandemic	
2022	Social El Olivo	La Victoria
2023	Miguel Grau	La Victoria
2024	Julio Guzmán	Angelu Lucrecia
2025	Miguel Grau	Peña Sport
2026	Miguel Grau	La Victoria

=== Liga Distrital de Andahuaylas ===
==== List of champions ====
Season	Champion	Runner-up
2009	José María Arguedas	UNAJMA
2010	UNAJMA	DECH
2011	UNAJMA	Siempre Chankas
2012	DECH	Siempre Chankas
2013	José María Arguedas	Siempre Chankas
2014	DECH	Siempre Chankas
2015	DECH	José María Arguedas
2016	DECH	José María Arguedas
2017	UNAJMA	EFUCH
2018	UNAJMA	EFUCH
2019	UAP	José María Arguedas
2020	Canceled due to the COVID-19 pandemic	
2021	Canceled due to the COVID-19 pandemic	
2022	UAP	José María Arguedas
2023	Argama FC	José María Arguedas
2024	Defensor José María Arguedas	Instituto Apurímac
2025	Instituto Apurímac	José María Arguedas
2026	José María Arguedas	Instituto Apurímac

== Arequipa ==
=== Liga Distrital de Arequipa ===
==== List of champions ====
Season		Champion	Runner-up
1918		White Star	Sport Victoria del Huayco
1919		Aurora	White Star
1920	I	Sport Victoria del Huayco	
1920	II	White Star	
1921	I	Aurora	White Star
1921	II	Melgar	Independencia
1922	I	White Star	Aurora
1922	II	Sport Victoria del Huayco	Aurora
1923	I	White Star	Melgar
1923	II	Melgar	White Star
1924	I	Independencia	White Star
1924	II	Suspended due to the Olympic Games held for the centenary of the Battle of Ayacucho.	
1925	I	Melgar	White Star
1925	II	White Star	Independencia
1925	III	Aurora	Melgar
1926	I	Sport Victoria del Huayco	Aurora
1926	II	Melgar	Independencia
1926	III	White Star	
1927	I	Piérola	Melgar
1927	II	Suspended due to disagreements between the League and the Peruvian Olympic Committee. The League was dissolved.	
1928	I	Melgar	Tranelec
1928	II	Suspended due to the participation of the Arequipa national team in the 1928 Campeonato Nacional.	
1929	I	White Star	Melgar
1929	II	Sportivo Huracán	Sport Victoria del Huayco
1929	III	Aurora	Melgar
1930		Aurora	Independencia
1931	I	Aurora	Melgar
1931	II	Aurora	Deportivo Sparta
1932	I	Sportivo Huracán	White Star
1932	II	Piérola	Aurora
1933		Aurora	Piérola
1934	I	Tranelec	Piérola
1934	II	Aurora	White Star
1935		Piérola	Aurora
1936	I	The final won by Piérola over White Star was annulled due to rule infractions by the referee and incidents on the field.	
1936	II	Aurora	Melgar
1937	I	Aurora	Tranelec
1937	II	Aurora	White Star
1938	I	Aurora	Tranelec
1938	II	Aurora	Piérola
1939	I	Tranelec	Aurora
1939	II	Piérola	White Star
1940		It was not held due to the construction of the Melgar Stadium and the celebrations of the city's fourth centenary.	
1941	I	Piérola	Tranelec
1941	II	Piérola	Tranelec
1942		Piérola	
1943		Tranelec	White Star
1944		Piérola	White Star
1945		Aurora	Piérola
1946		Independencia	
1947		Independencia	
1948		Independencia	Aurora
1949		Alianza San Isidro	Piérola
1950		Alianza San Isidro	Tranelec
1951		Aurora	Piérola
1952		Piérola	White Star
1953		Piérola	Melgar
1954		White Star	Independencia
1955		White Star	Piérola
1956		White Star	Piérola
1957		Piérola	Independencia
1958		Deportivo Isabelino	Piérola
1959		White Star	Independiente Miraflores
1960		Independiente Miraflores	León del Sur
1961		Piérola	Independiente Miraflores
1962		Melgar	Independencia
1963		Piérola	White Star
1964		Melgar	Aurora
1965		Melgar	Piérola
1967		Sportivo Huracán	Sportivo Huracán
1968		Melgar	Independiente Miraflores
1969		Melgar	Atlético Universidad
1970		Melgar	Sportivo Huracán
1971		Deportivo Carsa	
1972		Sportivo Huracán	
1973		Piérola	
1974		Sportivo Huracán	
1975		Atlético Universidad	
1976		Sportivo Huracán	
1977		Sportivo Huracán	
1978		Sportivo Huracán	
1979		Sportivo Huracán	
1980		Sportivo Huracán	
1981		Sportivo Huracán	
1982		Piérola	
1983		Sportivo Huracán	
1984		Sporting Tabaco (Socabaya)	
1985		Alianza Socabaya	
1986		Ciclón Guardia Civil	
1987		Aurora	
1988		Ciclón Guardia Civil	
1989		Alianza Socabaya	
1990		Sportivo Huracán	
1991		Sport Alianza (Mariano Melgar)	
1992		Piérola	
1993		Estrella del Misti	
1994		Yanahuara	
1995		Sportivo Huracán	
1996		Piérola	
2000		Atlético Universidad	
2001		Sportivo Huracán	
2003		Sportivo Huracán	
2004		Sportivo Huracán	
2006		Piérola	IDUNSA
2007		Aurora	IDUNSA
2008		Sportivo Huracán	Aurora
2009		Max Uhle	White Star
2010		Max Uhle	White Star
2011		White Star	Internacional
2012		Piérola	Internacional
2013		White Star	Internacional
2014		Internacional	Atlético Universidad
2015		Sportivo Huracán	Aurora
2016		Aurora	White Star
2017		Sportivo Huracán	Aurora
2018		Sportivo Huracán	Temperley
2019		Atlético Universidad	White Star
2020		Canceled due to the COVID-19 pandemic	
2021		Canceled due to the COVID-19 pandemic	
2022		Aurora	Atlético Universidad
2023		Aurora	Sportivo Huracán
2024		Sportivo Huracán	Atlético Universidad
2025		Tiznados	Aurora
2026		Sportivo Huracán	Sportivo Huracancito

=== Liga Distrital de Camaná ===
==== List of champions ====
Season	Champion	Runner-up
2009	Deportivo Estrella	Defensor Lima
2010	Defensor Lima	Buenos Aires
2011	Deportivo Olímpico	Deportivo Estrella
2012	Deportivo Camaná	José Granda
2013	Defensor Piérola	Deportivo Estrella
2014	José Granda	Deportivo Estrella
2015	Defensor Lima	Deportivo Estrella
2016	Buenos Aires	Deportivo Camaná
2017	Deportivo Estrella	Defensor Lima
2018	Defensor Lima	Buenos Aires
2019	Buenos Aires	José Granda
2020	Canceled due to the COVID-19 pandemic	
2021	Canceled due to the COVID-19 pandemic	
2022	Deportivo Camaná	Deportivo Estrella
2023	José Granda	Defensor Piérola
2024	Deportivo Estrella	Buenos Aires
2025	Deportivo Estrella	Deportivo Camaná
2026	Deportivo Estrella	Deportivo Camaná

=== Liga Distrital de Mollendo ===
==== List of champions ====
Season	Champion	Runner-up
2001	Inclán Sport	
2004	Inclán Sport	
2005	Atlético Mollendo	
2009	Deportivo Islay	Ramón Cáceres
2010	Francisco Bolognesi	Inclán Sport
2011	Inclán Sport	Sport Boys
2012	Atlético Mollendo	Alfonso Ugarte
2013	Alfonso Ugarte	Inclán Sport
2014	Sport Boys	Atlético Mollendo
2015	Atlético Mollendo	Inclán Sport
2016	Inclán Sport	Atlético Mollendo
2017	Inclán Sport	Sport Boys
2018	Sport Boys	Alto Las Cruces
2019	Nacional	Sport Boys
2020	Canceled due to the COVID-19 pandemic	
2021	Canceled due to the COVID-19 pandemic	
2022	Nacional	Inclán Sport
2023	Nacional	Inclán Sport
2024	Marítimo Sport	Inclán Sport
2025	Sport Boys	Alto Inclán
2026	Sport Boys	Alto Inclán

== Ayacucho ==
=== Liga Distrital de Ayacucho ===
==== List of champions ====
Season	Champion	Runner-up
2009	Percy Berrocal	Social Magdalena
2010	Señor de los Milagros	Atlético Huamanga
2011	Percy Berrocal	Estudiantes Unidos
2012	Juventud Gloria	Percy Berrocal
2013	Percy Berrocal	Deportivo Huáscar
2014	Percy Berrocal	Juventud Gloria
2015	Juventud Gloria	Percy Berrocal
2016	Percy Berrocal	Team Progreso
2017	Hijos de Vilcanchos	Percy Berrocal
2018	Percy Berrocal	Hijos de Vilcanchos
2019	Anchayhua FC	UNSCH
2020	Canceled due to the COVID-19 pandemic	
2021	Canceled due to the COVID-19 pandemic	
2022	Deportivo Huáscar	Percy Berrocal
2023	Percy Berrocal	UNSCH
2024	Señor de Quinuapata	UNSCH
2025	Señor de Quinuapata	Mariano Santos
2026	UNSCH	Señor de Quinuapata

=== Liga Distrital de Huanta ===
==== List of champions ====
Season	Champion	Runner-up
2010	Sport Alameda	Cultural Huracán
2013	Sport Huanta	Cultural Huracán
2014	Player Villafuerte	
2015	Sport Huanta	Player Villafuerte
2016	Sport Huanta	
2017	Player Villafuerte	Sport Huanta
2018	Player Villafuerte	Sport Huanta
2019	Player Villafuerte	Sport Huanta
2020	Canceled due to the COVID-19 pandemic	
2021	Canceled due to the COVID-19 pandemic	
2022	Cultural Huracán	Player Villafuerte
2023	Player Villafuerte	Escuela Nueva Generación
2024	Player Villafuerte	Cultural Huracán
2025	Player Villafuerte	Cultural Huracán
2026	Cultural Huracán	Sport Huanta

== Cajamarca ==
=== Liga Distrital de Cajamarca ===
==== List of champions ====
Season	Champion	Runner-up
2009	Alas Peruanas	Deportivo Davy
2010	Sport Universitario	JOSDIC
2011	San Ramón	Cruzeiro Porcón
2012	Juvenil UTC	Cruzeiro Porcón
2013	Juvenil UTC	Sporting Caxamarca
2014	Juvenil UTC	San Ramón
2015	Sporting Caxamarca	Juvenil UTC
2016	Real Jorge Leiva	
2017	Real Jorge Leiva	Juvenil UTC
2018	Real Jorge Leiva	Juvenil UTC
2019	JOSDIC	Real JJ
2020	Canceled due to the COVID-19 pandemic	
2021	Canceled due to the COVID-19 pandemic	
2022	Juvenil UTC	San Ramón
2023	Cajamarca	William Prescott
2024	Cajamarca	UNC
2025	Deportivo Ingeniería	Deportivo Punre
2026	Deportivo Punre	Juvenil UTC

=== Liga Distrital de Chota ===
==== List of champions ====
Season	Champion	Runner-up
2016	UNACH	
2017	UNACH	Las Palmas
2018	UNACH	
2019	Escuela Normal Chota	EDECH
2020	Canceled due to the COVID-19 pandemic	
2021	Canceled due to the COVID-19 pandemic	
2022	Las Palmas	UNACH
2023	Deportivo Chota	Escuela Normal Chota
2024	Deportivo Chota	Cultural Chota
2025	Las Palmas	Atlético Chalaco
2026	Las Palmas	Comerciantes Chota

=== Liga Distrital de Cutervo ===
==== List of champions ====
Season	Champion
2000	Los Inseparables
2004	Los Inseparables
2008	Comerciantes Unidos
2009	Carniche
2010	Carniche
2011	Alianza Cutervo
2012	Alianza Cutervo
2013	Comerciantes Unidos
2014	Los Inseparables
2015	Alianza Cutervo
2016	Deportivo Rodiopampa
2017	Los Inseparables
2018	Estudiantes Casanovistas
2019	Estudiantes Casanovistas
2020	Canceled due to the COVID-19 pandemic
2021	Canceled due to the COVID-19 pandemic
2022	Estudiantes Casanovistas
2023	Nuevo Tiempo
2024	Deportivo Rodiopampa
2025	No tournament
2026	Deportivo Rodiopampa

== Callao ==
=== Liga Distrital del Callao ===
- For the period 1932–1974, see Liga Provincial del Callao

==== List of champions ====
Ed.	Season	Champion	Runner-up
1	1975	Once Amigos Unión	Deportivo El Bronce
2	1976	Deportivo SIMA	ENAPU
3	1977	Atlético Ayacucho	
4	1978	Alianza Tucumán	Grumete Medina
5	1979	Grumete Medina	Atlético Ayacucho
6	1980	ENAPU	Unión Buenos Aires
7	1981	Academia Cantolao	Victor Marín
8	1982	Deportivo SIMA	ENAPU
9	1983	ENAPU	Grumete Medina
10	1984	ENAPU	Defensor La Perla
11	1985	CITEN	Deportivo SIMA
12	1986	Santa Marina Norte	Victor Marín
13	1987	KDT Nacional	Deportivo SIMA
14	1988		
15	1989	Independiente Chacaritas	Castilla Tarapacá
16	1990	Deportivo SIMA	KDT Nacional
17	1991	Rosa Huertas	Diego Ferré
18	1992	Atlético Chalaco	Deportivo Milán
19	1993	Alfredo Alvarado	
20	1994	CITEN	Atlético Barrio Frigorífico
21	1995	Santa Marina Norte	CITEN
22	1996	Atlético Chalaco	Atlético Guisse
23	1997	Atlético Chalaco	
24	1999	Deportivo SIMA	Atlético Barrio Frigorífico
25	2000	Atlético Chalaco	Deportivo SIMA
26	2001	Atlético Chalaco	Deportivo SIMA
27	2002	Aurelio Colombo	Atlético Chalaco
28	2003		
29	2004	Atlético Chalaco	Aurelio Colombo
30	2005	Atlético Chalaco	Chim Pum Callao
31	2006	Deportivo SIMA	Atlético Barrio Frigorífico
32	2007	Atlético Chalaco	Unión Castillo
33	2008	Atlético Chalaco	Deportivo SIMA
34	2009	Deportivo SIMA	Atlético Chalaco
35	2010	Unión Castillo	Deportivo SIMA
36	2011	América Callao	Deportivo Colonial
37	2012	Atlético Chalaco	Veterinaria FBC
38	2013	Deportivo Colonial	Atlético Chalaco
39	2014	América Callao	Sentimiento Porteño
40	2015	ADC Callao	Sentimiento Porteño
41	2016	Sport Blue Rays	Sentimiento Porteño
42	2017	Sport Callao	ADC Callao
43	2018	Chalaca FC	Sport Callao
44	2019	Apple Sport	Sport Callao
–	2020	Canceled due to the COVID-19 pandemic	
–	2021	Canceled due to the COVID-19 pandemic	
45	2022	Atlético Chalaco	Chalaca FC
46	2023	ADC Callao	Chalaca FC
47	2024	Chalaca FC	Amazon Callao
48	2025	Hacienda San Agustín	Santa Marina Norte
49	2026		

=== Liga Distrital de La Perla ===
==== List of champions ====
Ed.	Season	Champion	Runner-up
1	2023	Calidad Porteña	Sport Carlos Anglas
2	2024	Calidad Porteña	Academia RC8
3	2025	Calidad Porteña	Academia RC8
4	2026		

=== Liga Distrital de Mi Perú ===
==== List of champions ====
Ed.	Season	Champion	Runner-up
1	2019	Unión Progreso	Juventud Palmeiras
–	2020	Canceled due to the COVID-19 pandemic	
–	2021	Canceled due to the COVID-19 pandemic	
2	2022	Juventud Palmeiras	Unión Progreso
3	2023	Juventud Palmeiras	Atlético Sullana
4	2024	Juventud Palmeiras	Atlético Sullana
5	2025	Juventud Palmeiras	Aviar Soccer
6	2026		

=== Liga Distrital de Bellavista - La Perla ===
==== List of champions ====
Ed.	Season	Champion	Runner-up
1	1987	Guillermo Rodríguez	
2	1988	Defensor La Perla	Academia Cantolao
3	1989	No champion crowned	
4	1990	Deportivo Nacional	
5	1991	Juventud La Perla	
6	1992	Sport Huáscar	
7	1993	Juventud La Perla	
8	1994	Alianza Tucumán	
9	1995	Francisco Pizarro - Somos Aduanas	
10	1996	Juventud La Perla	
11	1997	Somos Aduanas	
12	1998	Somos Aduanas	
13	1999	Somos Aduanas	
14	2000	María Auxiliadora	
15	2001	Somos Aduanas	
16	2002	Academia Pro Fútbol	
17	2003	Defensor Mórrope	
18	2004	Defensor Tacna	
19	2005	Sport Huáscar	
20	2006	Academia Cantolao	
21	2007	Defensor Tacna	
22	2008	Defensor Tacna	Juventud La Perla
23	2009	Juventud La Perla	
24	2010	América Latina	Somos Aduanas
25	2011	América Latina	Amigos por Siempre
26	2012	América Latina	
27	2013	América Latina	
28	2014	Academia Cantolao	
29	2015	Academia Cantolao	
30	2016	América Latina	
31	2017		
32	2018		
33	2019		
–	2020	Canceled due to the COVID-19 pandemic	
–	2021	Canceled due to the COVID-19 pandemic	
34	2022	San Judas Tadeo	
35	2023	FC JOB 05	Zurgol
36	2024	Atlético Porteño	Scratch
37	2025	Deportivo Gentlemen	FC JOB 05
38	2026		

=== Liga Distrital de Carmen de La Legua Reynoso ===
==== List of champions ====
Season	Champion	Runner-up
1985	Cultural Peñarol	
1986	Cultural Peñarol	
1987	Cultural Peñarol	
2009	José López Pazos	
2010	Nuevo Callao	ADEBAMI
2011	Cultural Peñarol	José Gálvez
2012	Dynamo Callao	José López Pazos
2013	ADEBAMI	
2014	Cultural Peñarol	
2015	Cultural Peñarol	
2016	Cultural Peñarol	José López Pazos
2017	Dynamo Callao	
2018	José López Pazos	
2019	José López Pasos	
2020	Canceled due to the COVID-19 pandemic	
2021	Canceled due to the COVID-19 pandemic	
2022	ADEBAMI	
2023	ADEBAMI	Cultural Centella
2024	Cultural Peñarol	Full Sábado
2025	Íntimos de Reynoso	Full Sábado
2026		

=== Liga Distrital de Dulanto ===
==== List of champions ====
Season	Champion	Runner-up
2007	Atlético Pilsen Callao	
2008	Atlético Pilsen Callao	
2009	Atlético Pilsen Callao	
2010	Atlético Centenario	
2011	Sucre Callao	Olímpico Bella Unión
2012	Defensor Todos Unidos	
2013	Defensor Todos Unidos	
2014	Halcones de Dulanto	
2015	Sucre Callao	
2016	Independiente Unión Chalaca	
2017	Atlético Pilsen Callao	
2018	Sucre Callao	
2019	Independiente Unión Chalaca	
2020	Canceled due to the COVID-19 pandemic	
2021	Canceled due to the COVID-19 pandemic	
2022	Defensor Todos Unidos	
2023	Atlético Pilsen Callao	Defensor Todos Unidos
2024	Defensor Todos Unidos	Estrella Roja
2025	Defensor Todos Unidos	Estrella Roja
2026		

=== Liga Distrital de Ventanilla ===
==== List of champions ====
Ed.	Season	Champion	Runner-up
1	1975	Hijos de Yurimaguas	
2	1976	San Martín	
3	1977	Hijos de Yurimaguas	
4	1978	San Martín	
5	1979	Hijos de Yurimaguas	
6	1980	Hijos de Yurimaguas	
7	1981	Estrella Azul	
8	1982	Estrella Azul	
9	1983	Hijos de Yurimaguas	
10	1984	Estrella Azul	
11	1985	Hijos de Yurimaguas	Estrella Azul
12	1986	Hijos de Yurimaguas	
13	1987	Sport Las Mercedes	
14	1988	Estrella Azul	Estrella Azul
15	1989	Sucre San Jorge	
16	1990	Estrella Azul	
17	1991	Los Amigos	
18	1992	Sucre San Jorge	
19	1993	ADO	
20	1994	AEB	
21	1995	AEB	
22	1996	Jesús Dulanto	
23	1997	Cultural Progreso	Estrella Azul
24	1998	Cultural Progreso	
25	1999	Cultural Progreso	
26	2000	Atlético Satélite	
27	2001	Jesús Dulanto	
28	2002	Santo Domingo	Estrella Azul
29	2003	Sport Las Mercedes	
30	2004	Sport Las Mercedes	
31	2005	Sport Las Mercedes	Estrella Azul
32	2006	Jesús Dulanto	
33	2007	Alfredo Tomassini	
34	2008	Alfredo Tomassini	
35	2009	UDP	Hijos de Yurimaguas
36	2010	Deportivo Yurimaguas	
37	2011	Atlético Satélite	Sport Las Mercedes
38	2012	Márquez FC	Estrella Azul
39	2013	Estrella Azul	
40	2014	Alfredo Tomassini	Estrella Azul
41	2015	Estrella Azul	
42	2016	Alfredo Tomassini	
43	2017	AEB	
44	2018	Alfredo Tomassini	
45	2019	AEB	Estrella Azul
–	2020	Canceled due to the COVID-19 pandemic	
–	2021	Canceled due to the COVID-19 pandemic	
46	2022	Dan Las Lomas	
47	2023	AEB	León de Juda
48	2024	AEB	Calle 23
49	2025	Pachapool	Calle 23
50	2026		

== Cusco ==
=== Liga Distrital del Cusco ===
==== List of champions ====
Season	Champion	Runner-up
2003	Deportivo Garcilaso	
2004	Deportivo Garcilaso	
2005	Deportivo Garcilaso	
2006	Cienciano Junior	
2007	Cienciano Junior	
2008	Deportivo Garcilaso	
2009	Deportivo Garcilaso	Cienciano Junior
2010	Real Garcilaso	Deportivo Garcilaso
2011	Deportivo Garcilaso	Salesiano
2012	Deportivo Garcilaso	Cienciano Junior
2013	Cienciano Junior	Deportivo Garcilaso
2014	Deportivo Garcilaso	Cienciano Junior
2015	Cienciano Junior	Deportivo Garcilaso
2016	Cienciano Junior	Ingeniería Civil
2017	Ingeniería Eléctrica	Ingeniería Civil
2018	Deportivo Garcilaso	Ingeniería Eléctrica
2019	Salesiano	Cienciano Junior
2020	Canceled due to the COVID-19 pandemic	
2021	Canceled due to the COVID-19 pandemic	
2022	Inkas FC	Deportivo Garcilaso
2023	Ingeniería Civil	UNSAAC
2024	UNSAAC	Deportivo Balconcillo
2025	Sport Liberales	Cienciano Junior
2026	Ingeniería Civil	UNSAAC

== Huancavelica ==
=== Liga Distrital de Ascensión ===
==== List of champions ====
Season	Champion	Runner-up
2010	UDA	Universitario de Pucarumi
2011	Pueblo Libre	Universitario de Pucarumi
2012	UDA	Universitario de Pucarumi
2013	UDA	Heraldos Negros
2014	UDA	
2015	UDA	
2016	UDA	
2017	UDA	
2018	UDA	
2019	Deportivo Vianney	Universitario de Pucarumi
2020	Canceled due to the COVID-19 pandemic	
2021	Canceled due to the COVID-19 pandemic	
2022	UNH	Deportivo Vianney
2023	UNH	Deportivo Vianney
2024	UDA	Universitario de Pucarumi
2025	UNH	Universitario de Pucarumi
2026	Heraldos Negros	UNH

=== Liga Distrital de Huancavelica ===
==== List of champions ====
Season	Champion	Runner-up
2009	Santa Rosa	Diablos Rojos
2010	Diablos Rojos	Santa Rosa
2011	Diablos Rojos	Racing FBC
2012	Santa Rosa	Diablos Rojos
2013	Racing FBC	Santa Rosa
2014	Santa Rosa	Racing FBC
2015	Santa Rosa	Racing FBC
2016	Cultural Bolognesi	Racing FBC
2017	Diablos Rojos	
2018	Unión Santa Bárbara	Deportivo Caminos
2019	Santa Rosa	Deportivo Caminos
2020	Canceled due to the COVID-19 pandemic	
2021	Canceled due to the COVID-19 pandemic	
2022	Cultural Bolognesi	Santa Rosa
2023	Diablos Rojos	
2024	Unión Deportivo Calvario	Unión Santa Bárbara
2025	Unión Santa Bárbara	Diablos Rojos
2026	Unión Deportivo Calvario	Diablos Rojos

== Huánuco ==
=== Liga Distrital de Huánuco ===
==== List of champions ====
Season	Champion	Runner-up
2009	Santa Rosa Junior	UNHEVAL
2010	Santa Rosa Junior	UNHEVAL
2011	Santa Rosa Junior	UNHEVAL
2012	San Luis Gonzaga	UNHEVAL
2013	UNHEVAL	Los Ángeles
2014	UNHEVAL	Deportivo América
2015	Cultural Tarapacá	Los Pumas
2016	Cultural Tarapacá	Deportivo América
2017	Miguel Grau UDH	UNHEVAL
2018	Alianza Universidad	León de Huánuco
2019	UNHEVAL	León de Huánuco
2020	Canceled due to the COVID-19 pandemic	
2021	Canceled due to the COVID-19 pandemic	
2022	UNHEVAL	León de Huánuco
2023	Construcción Civil	UNHEVAL
2024	Cultural Tarapacá	Construcción Civil
2025	Miguel Grau UDH	León de Huánuco
2026	Atlético EVZA	Miguel Grau UDH

== Ica ==
=== Liga Distrital de Ica ===
- The Liga Distrital de Ica (Ica District Football League) was founded on July 6, 1923.

==== List of champions ====
Season	Champion	Runner-up
2000	Sport Victoria	
2002	Sport Alfonso Ugarte	
2003	Abraham Valdelomar	
2004	Sport Alfonso Ugarte	
2005	Abraham Valdelomar	
2006	Sport Victoria	
2007	Abraham Valdelomar	Atlético Luren
2008	Deportivo UNICA	Abraham Valdelomar
2009	Sport Victoria	Abraham Valdelomar
2010	Sport Victoria	Octavio Espinosa
2011	Simón Bolívar	Sport Marino
2012	Simón Bolívar	Octavio Espinosa
2013	Santa María	Octavio Espinosa
2014	Octavio Espinosa	Juventud Santa Rosa
2015	Deportivo Huracán	Sport Marino
2016	Deportivo Municipal	Octavio Espinosa
2017	Deportivo Municipal	Sport Marino
2018	Octavio Espinosa	Sport Marino
2019	Juventud Santa Rosa	Octavio Espinosa
2020	Canceled due to the COVID-19 pandemic	
2021	Canceled due to the COVID-19 pandemic	
2022	San Francisco de Asís	Octavio Espinosa
2023	Sport Victoria	Octavio Espinosa
2024	Sport Alfonso Ugarte	Sport Marino
2025	Simón Bolívar	Ica City
2026	Adjudicatarios San Joaquín	Simón Bolívar

=== Liga Distrital de Nasca ===
==== List of champions ====
Season	Champion	Runner-up
2009	Defensor Zarumilla	Juventud Santa Fe
2010	Defensor Zarumilla	Independiente Cantayo
2011	Defensor Zarumilla	Miraflores FC
2012	Juan Mata	Simón Rodríguez
2013	Independiente Cantayo	Juan Mata
2014	Defensor Zarumilla	Juan Mata
2015	Juventud Santa Fe	Independiente Cantayo
2016	Defensor Zarumilla	Francisco Oropeza
2017	Independiente Cantayo	Defensor Zarumilla
2018	Unión López	Defensor Zarumilla
2019	Independiente Cantayo	Defensor Zarumilla
2020	Canceled due to the COVID-19 pandemic	
2021	Canceled due to the COVID-19 pandemic	
2022	Deportivo Orcona	Juventud Santo Domingo
2023	Juventud Santo Domingo	Deportivo Orcona
2024	Juventud Santo Domingo	Juventud Santa Fe
2025	Juventud Santa Fe	Independiente Cantayo
2026	Juventud Santa Fe	Independiente Cantayo

=== Liga Distrital de Pisco ===
- The Liga Distrital de Pisco (Pisco District Football League) was founded on October 25, 1923.

==== List of champions ====
Season	Champion	Runner-up
2009	Joe Gutiérrez	Alianza Pisco
2010	Joe Gutiérrez	Unión San Martín
2011	Sport Bolognesi	Alianza Pisco
2012	Unión San Martín	Deportivo Municipal
2013	Sport Bolognesi	Universitario
2014	Manuel Gonzáles Prada	Alianza Pisco
2015	Unión San Martín	Manuel Gonzáles Prada
2016	Universitario	Unión San Martín
2017	Alianza Pisco	Unión San Martín
2018	Juventud Santa Rosa	Joe Gutiérrez
2019	Juventud Santa Rosa	Unión San Martín
2020	Canceled due to the COVID-19 pandemic	
2021	Canceled due to the COVID-19 pandemic	
2022	Alianza Pisco	Juventud Policial
2023	Juventud Santa Rosa	Alianza Pisco
2024	Alianza Pisco	Universitario
2025	Alianza Pisco	Manuel Gonzáles Prada
2026	Sport Bolognesi	Manuel Gonzáles Prada

== Junín ==
=== Liga Distrital de Huancayo ===
==== List of champions ====
Season	Champion	Runner-up
2009	Deportivo Junín	UPLA
2010	Pianto FC	Academia Expreso Verde
2011	Deportivo Ingeniería	Pianto FC
2012	Pianto FC	UPLA
2013	UNCP	Deportivo Belén
2014	Trilce Internacional	Academia Inti
2015	Trilce Internacional	Deportivo Ingeniería
2016	Ramiro Villaverde	Academia Expreso Verde
2017	Deporcentro	Trilce Internacional
2018	Trilce Internacional	León de Huancayo
2019	León de Huancayo	Trilce Internacional
2020	Canceled due to the COVID-19 pandemic	
2021	Canceled due to the COVID-19 pandemic	
2022	AFAR Shalom	Trilce Internacional
2023	AFAR Shalom	Juventud La Rural
2024	AFAR Shalom	Deportivo Junín
2025	Deporcentro	Juventud La Rural
2026	Deporcentro	AFAR Shalom

=== Liga Distrital de Mazamari ===
==== List of champions ====
Season	Champion
2009	Alipio Ponce
2010	Alipio Ponce
2011	Alipio Ponce
2012	Alipio Ponce
2013	Alipio Ponce
2014	Unión Talleres
2015	Alipio Ponce
2016	Alipio Ponce
2017	Alipio Ponce
2018	Alipio Ponce
2019	Alipio Ponce
2020	Canceled due to the COVID-19 pandemic
2021	Canceled due to the COVID-19 pandemic
2022	Alipio Ponce
2023	Academia Municipal
2024	Academia CrediSolución
2025	Alipio Ponce
2026	Alipio Ponce

=== Liga Distrital de Tarma ===
==== List of champions ====
Season	Champion	Runner-up
2009	ADT	Colegio Nacional Industrial
2010	Sport Dos de Mayo	ADT
2011	São Paulo Vicentino	Sport San Ramón
2012	São Paulo Vicentino	Cultural Vicentina
2013	ADT	Sport Dos de Mayo
2014	ADT	Cultural Vicentina
2015	ADT	Sport Dos de Mayo
2016	ADT	Sport Dos de Mayo
2017	ADT	Sport San Cristóbal
2018	ADT	Sport Dos de Mayo
2019	ADT	Sport San Cristóbal
2020	Canceled due to the COVID-19 pandemic	
2021	Canceled due to the COVID-19 pandemic	
2022	Sport Dos de Mayo	Los Canarios
2023	Sport Dos de Mayo	Los Canarios
2024	Sport Dos de Mayo	Los Canarios
2025	Sport Dos de Mayo	Los Canarios
2026	Los Canarios	FYS Tarma

== La Libertad ==
=== Liga Distrital de Chao ===
==== List of champions ====
Season	Champion
2007	El Inca
2008	El Inca
2009	El Inca
2010	6 de Septiembre
2011	El Inca
2012	El Inca
2013	El Inca
2014	El Inca
2015	El Inca
2016	El Inca
2017	El Inca
2018	El Inca
2019	El Inca
2020	Canceled due to the COVID-19 pandemic
2021	Canceled due to the COVID-19 pandemic
2022	El Inca
2023	El Inca
2024	El Inca
2025	El Inca
2026	El Inca

=== Liga Distrital de Huamachuco ===
==== List of champions ====
Season	Champion	Runner-up
2010	Racing	Miguel Grau
2013	Deportivo Municipal	Racing
2014	Deportivo Municipal	Racing
2015	Racing	Juventus
2016	Juventus	Defensor Torino
2017	Miguel Grau	
2018	Racing	Real Huamachuco
2019	Real Huamachuco	Héroes de Huamachuco
2020	Canceled due to the COVID-19 pandemic	
2021	Canceled due to the COVID-19 pandemic	
2022	Racing	Unión Huamachuco
2023	Deportivo Sausacocha	Unión Huamachuco
2024	Juventus	La Arena
2025	Sporting Huamachuco	Independiente de Gala
2026	Sporting Huamachuco	Diamante Gala

=== Liga Distrital de Pacasmayo ===
==== List of champions ====
Season	Champion	Runner-up
2013	Torbellino	El Porvenir
2014	Sport Chavelines	Torbellino
2015	Juvenil Sporting Cristal	Torbellino
2016	Sport Chavelines	Los Espartanos
2017	Torbellino	Sport Chavelines
2018	Torbellino	Sport Progreso
2019	Sport Chavelines	Torbellino
2020	Canceled due to the COVID-19 pandemic	
2021	Canceled due to the COVID-19 pandemic	
2022	Academia Chavelines	El Porvenir
2023	Torbellino	Juvenil Sporting Cristal
2024	Torbellino	Los Porteños
2025	Independiente	Los Porteños
2026	Independiente	Los Porteños

=== Liga Distrital de Trujillo ===
- The Liga Distrital de Trujillo (Trujillo District Football League) was founded on November 20, 1924.

==== List of champions ====
Season	Champion	Runner-up
1993	Sanjuanista	
1994	Sanjuanista	
1995	Alfonso Ugarte de Chiclín	
1996	Carlos A. Mannucci	
1997	Deportivo UPAO	
1998	Carlos A. Mannucci	
1999	Deportivo UPAO	
2000	Carlos A. Mannucci	
2001	Universidad César Vallejo	
2002	Carlos A. Mannucci	
2003	Atlético Medellín	
2004	UNT	
2005	Atlético Medellín	
2006	Carlos A. Mannucci	Sport Vallejo
2007	Carlos A. Mannucci	Universitario de Trujillo
2008	Carlos A. Mannucci	Universitario de Trujillo
2009	Universitario de Trujillo	Carlos A. Mannucci
2010	Sport Vallejo	Carlos Tenaud
2011	Universitario UPAO	Universitario de Trujillo
2012	UNT	Universitario UPAO
2013	Carlos A. Mannucci	Universitario UPAO
2014	Sport Vallejo	Universitario UPAO
2015	Universitario UPAO	Carlos Tenaud
2016	Carlos Tenaud	UNT
2017	Alfonso Ugarte de Chiclín	Deportivo Municipal
2018	Alianza Libertad	Atlético Medellín
2019	Atlético Medellín	Alfonso Ugarte de Chiclín
2020	Canceled due to the COVID-19 pandemic	
2021	Canceled due to the COVID-19 pandemic	
2022	Carlos Tenaud	Training Gol
2023	Training Gol	Alfonso Ugarte de Chiclín
2024	Training Gol	Universitario UPAO
2025	Alfonso Ugarte de Chiclín	Training Gol
2026	Unión Pacífico	Alfonso Ugarte de Chiclín

== Lambayeque ==
=== Liga Distrital de Chiclayo ===
==== List of champions ====
Ed.	Season	Champion	Runner-up
1	1922	Association	
2	1923	Association	
3	1924	Association	
–	1925	No held for the 1925 El Niño	
4	1926	Deportivo Espinar	
5	1927	Deportivo Espinar	
6	1928	Deportivo Espinar	
7	1929	Deportivo Espinar	
8	1930	Deportivo Espinar	
9	1931	Deportivo Espinar	
10	1932	Deportivo Espinar	
11	1933	Association	
12	1934	Association	
13	1935	Boca Juniors	
–	1936	No tournament	
–	1937	No tournament	
14	1938	Deportivo Espinar	
15	1939	Juan Aurich	
16	1940	Deportivo Espinar	
17	1941	Boca Juniors	
18	1942	Boca Juniors	
19	1943	Base Aérea	
20	1944	Base Aérea	
21	1945	Deportivo Jesús	
22	1946	Deportivo Jesús	
23	1947	Sport José Pardo	
24	1948	Sport José Pardo	
25	1949	Sport José Pardo	
26	1950	Boca Juniors	
27	1951	Boca Juniors	
28	1952	Boca Juniors	
29	1953	Sport José Pardo	
30	1954	Deportivo Municipal	
–	1955	No tournament	
31	1956	Sport José Pardo	
32	1957	Boca Juniors	
33	1958	Boca Juniors	
34	1959	Sport José Pardo	
35	1960	San Lorenzo	
36	1961	Boca Juniors	
37	1962	Boca Juniors	
38	1963	Boca Juniors	
39	1964	Boca Juniors	
40	1965	Boca Juniors	
41	1966	Juan Aurich	
42	1967	San Lorenzo	
43	1968	San Lorenzo	
44	1969	Unión Tumán	
45	1970	Unión Tumán	
46	1971	Deportivo Municipal	
47	1972	Deportivo Pucalá	
48	1973	Deportivo Pucalá	
49	1974	Deportivo Pucalá	
50	1975	Deportivo Municipal	
51	1976	Boca Juniors	
52	1977	Deportivo Municipal	
53	1978	Unión Tumán	
54	1979	Unión Tumán	
55	1980	Alianza Porvenir	
56	1981	Alianza Porvenir	
57	1982	Deportivo Pomalca	
58	1983	Boca Juniors	
59	1984	Deportivo Pomalca	
60	1985	Alianza Porvenir	
61	1986	Juan Aurich	
62	1987	San Lorenzo	
63	1988	Boca Juniors	
64	1989	Siete de Enero	
65	1990	Melgar de Pomalca	
66	1991	San Lorenzo	
67	1992	San Lorenzo	
68	1993	Unión Tumán	
69	1994	Boca Juniors	
70	1995	Deportivo Pomalca	
71	1996	Juan Aurich	
72	1997	Juan Aurich	
73	1998	Deportivo Pomalca	
74	1999	Deportivo Pomalca	
75	2000	Sport José Pardo	
76	2001	Deportivo Pomalca	
77	2002	Deportivo Pomalca	
78	2003	Rayos-X Medicina	
79	2004	Deportivo Municipal	
80	2005	Universidad Señor de Sipán	
81	2006	Universidad Señor de Sipán	
82	2007	Universidad Señor de Sipán	Unión Capote
83	2008	Unión Capote	Rayos-X Medicina
84	2009	Rayos-X Medicina	Dínamo
85	2010	Rayos-X Medicina	Sport Salaverry
86	2011	Rayos-X Medicina	Sport Salaverry
87	2012	Rayos-X Medicina	La Nueva Alianza
88	2013	La Nueva Alianza	Deportivo Albertseb
89	2014	San Lorenzo	Deportivo Albertseb
90	2015	Rayos-X Medicina	Estudiantil Diego Ferré
91	2016	Rayos-X Medicina	Futuro Porvenir
92	2017	Estudiantil Diego Ferré	Rayos-X Medicina
93	2018	Estudiantes Boca	Alianza Buenos Aires
94	2019	Lapoint y Cía.	Rayos-X Medicina
–	2020	Canceled due to the COVID-19 pandemic	
–	2021	Canceled due to the COVID-19 pandemic	
95	2022	Boca Juniors	Atlético Pedro Ruiz
96	2023	Boca Juniors	Atlético Pedro Ruiz
97	2024	Boca Juniors	Alianza Buenos Aires
98	2025	José Balta	Alianza Buenos Aires
99	2026	José Balta	Boca Juniors

== Lima Metropolitana ==
=== Liga Distrital de Ancón ===
==== List of champions ====
Season	Champion	Runner-up
2007	Asunción Chacas	Leoncio Prado
2008	Rosario Central	
2009	Rosario Central	Asunción Chacas
2010	Atlético Ovación	Marinero Robles
2011	Atlético Ovación	Marinero Robles
2012	Marinero Robles	Leoncio Prado
2013	Leoncio Prado	Marinero Robles
2014	Rosario Central	Atlético Ovación
2015	Marinero Robles	Arakaky FC
2016	Marinero Robles	Marítimo Grau
2017	Marinero Robles	Alianza Atlético Ancón
2018	Alianza Atlético Ancón	Marinero Robles
2019	Leoncio Prado	Marinero Robles
2020	Canceled due to the COVID-19 pandemic	
2021	Canceled due to the COVID-19 pandemic	
2022	Deportivo Coovitiomar	Escuela El Rey
2023	San Antonio	Rosario Central
2024	Rosario Central	Leoncio Prado
2025	Leoncio Prado	Atlético AFS
2026	Leoncio Prado	Olympiakos

=== Liga Distrital de Ate Vitarte ===
==== List of champions ====
Season	Champion	Runner-up
2007	Los Martillos	Óscar Benavides
2008	Íntimo Cable Visión	
2009	Los Halcones	Libertad y Deportes
2010	Atlético Tornado	Los Martillos
2012	Atlético Tornado	Botafogo FC
2013	Atlético Tornado	JA 25 de Julio
2014	Fraternal Santa Clara	Atlético Tornado
2015	Sport Mercurio	Atlético Tornado
2016	Fraternal Santa Clara	Atlético Tornado
2017	Atlético Tornado	Íntimo Cable Visión
2018	Íntimo Cable Visión	Fraternal Santa Clara
2019	Óscar Benavides	Fraternal Santa Clara
2020	Canceled due to the COVID-19 pandemic	
2021	Canceled due to the COVID-19 pandemic	
2022	Fraternal Santa Clara	Atlético Tornado
2023	Fraternal Santa Clara	Sol de Vitarte
2024	Semilleros del Valle Amauta	Atlético Tornado
2025	Sol de Vitarte	Unión Minas
2026	Deportivo Bellavista	Semilleros del Valle Amauta

=== Liga Distrital de Barranco ===
- The Liga Distrital de Barranco (Barranco District Football League) was founded on March 13, 1975.

==== List of champions ====
Season	Champion	Runner-up
2007	Cooperativa Bolognesi	Carlos Funes Legario
2008	Cooperativa Bolognesi	
2009	Cooperativa Bolognesi	Los del Parque
2010	Cooperativa Bolognesi	Santa Isabel
2011	Cooperativa Bolognesi	Real San Francisco
2012	Diablos Rojos	Los del Parque
2013	Cooperativa Bolognesi	Real San Francisco
2014	Mariano de los Santos	Santa Isabel
2015	Los del Parque	Mariano de Los Santos
2016	Partizan Barranco	Cooperativa Bolognesi
2017	Mariano de Los Santos	Cooperativa Bolognesi
2018	Cooperativa Bolognesi	Diablos Rojos
2019	Estrella Roja	Barranco City
2020	Canceled due to the COVID-19 pandemic	
2021	Canceled due to the COVID-19 pandemic	
2022	Barranco City	Estrella Roja
2023	Barranco City	Estrella Roja
2024	Diablos Rojos	Olímpico Perú
2025	Diablos Rojos	Los del Parque
2026	María Parado de Bellido	Los del Parque

=== Liga Distrital de Breña ===
==== List of champions ====
Season	Champion	Runner-up
2007	Rectificaciones Sánchez	Carasucias
2008	CFF LETS	
2009	UPCI Computronic	Residencial Callao
2010	UPCI Computronic	Deportivo Torino
2011	UPCI Computronic	Deportivo Torino
2012	Deportivo Municipal	UPCI Computronic
2013	UPCI Computronic	Deportivo Torino
2014	Deportivo Torino	Hijos de Acosvinchos FC
2015	Deportivo Torino	UPCI Computronic
2016	Cienciano	UPCI Computronic
2017	UPCI Computronic	Defensor Lima
2018	Defensor Lima FC	UPCI Computronic
2019	UPCI Computronic	Nuevo Sport Perú
2020	Canceled due to the COVID-19 pandemic	
2021	Canceled due to the COVID-19 pandemic	
2022	UPCI Computronic	Defensor Lima Carasucias
2023	Deportivo Chelsea	UPCI Computronic
2024	Deportivo Chelsea	Semillero San Gabriel
2025	ONG Sueños de Esperanza Carasucias	Nacional Lima
2026	Nacional Lima	ONG Sueños de Esperanza Carasucias

=== Liga Distrital de Carabayllo ===
==== List of champions ====
Season	Champion	Runner-up
2007	Walter Ormeño	Nicolás de Piérola
2008	Deportivo Vallecito	
2009	9 de Octubre	Deportivo Marañón
2010	Deportivo Marañón	9 de Octubre
2011	Deportivo Marañón	Deportivo Vallecito
2012	Deportivo Marañón	Defensor La Pólvora
2013	Independiente San Felipe	Deportivo Los Cedros
2014	Atlético Huatocay	Deportivo Vallecito
2015	Independiente San Felipe	Atlético Huatocay
2016	Atlético Huatocay	Independiente San Felipe
2017	Independiente San Felipe	América Santa Isabel
2018	Academia Soccer Star	Cosmos de Lima Norte
2019	Academia Soccer Star	Deportivo Marañón
2020	Canceled due to the COVID-19 pandemic	
2021	Canceled due to the COVID-19 pandemic	
2022	Independiente San Felipe	Deportivo Marañón
2023	Deportivo Marañón	Independiente San Felipe
2024	Independiente San Felipe	Geotecnia FC
2025	Geotecnia FC	Atlético Áncash
2026	Academia Soccer Star	América Santa Isabel

=== Liga Distrital de Cercado de Lima ===
==== List of champions ====
Ed.	Season	Champion	Runner-up
1	1975	Centro Iqueño	Universidad San Marcos
2	1976	Seguro Social	CITSA
3	1977	Ricardo Palma	
4	1978	Porvenir Buenos Aires	
5	1979	Atlético Lusitania	
6	1980	Porvenir Buenos Aires	
7	1981	Teniente Arancibia	
8	1982	Porvenir Buenos Aires	
9	1983	Porvenir Buenos Aires	
10	1984	Universidad San Marcos	
11	1985	Teniente Arancibia	
12	1986	Teniente Arancibia	
13	1987	Ricardo Palma	
14	1988	Humberto Valle	
15	1989	Unión Carbone	
16	1990	Humberto Valle	
17	1991	Humberto Valle	
18	1992	Raymundo Camargo	
19	1993	Compañía Peruana de Teléfonos	
20	1994	Compañía Peruana de Teléfonos	
21	1995	Cultural San Carlos	
22	1996	Cultural Senati	
23	1997	Cultural Senati	
24	1998	Cultural Senati	
25	1999	Universidad San Marcos	
26	2000	Universidad San Marcos	
27	2001	Juventud Villa María	
28	2002	Defensor América	
29	2003	Defensor Lima	
30	2004	Porvenir Buenos Aires	
31	2005	Juventud Villa María	
32	2006	Juventud Villa María	
33	2007	Porvenir Buenos Aires	Jardín Primavera
34	2008	Porvenir Buenos Aires	Defensor Lima
35	2009	Estudiantil Ascope	Porvenir Buenos Aires
36	2010	Estudiantil Ascope	Jardín Primavera
37	2011	Deportivo Municipal	Estudiantil Ascope
38	2012	Estudiantil Lucanas	Porvenir Buenos Aires
39	2013	Estudiantil Ascope	Universidad San Marcos
40	2014	Universidad San Marcos	Los Blue Rays
41	2015	Los Blue Rays	Universidad San Marcos
42	2016	Los Blue Rays	Estudiantil Ascope
43	2017	Los Blue Rays	Perpetuo Socorro
44	2018	Los Blue Rays	Estudiantil Ascope
45	2019	Independiente San Idelfonso	Estudiantil Ascope
–	2020	Canceled due to the COVID-19 pandemic	
–	2021	Canceled due to the COVID-19 pandemic	
46	2022	Estudiantil Ascope	FC Católica
47	2023	FC Católica	Perpetuo Socorro
48	2024	FC Católica	Juventud Villa María
49	2025	Juventud Villa María	Perpetuo Socorro
50	2026	FC Católica	Perpetuo Socorro

=== Liga Distrital de Chaclacayo ===
==== List of champions ====
Season	Champion	Runner-up
2007	Santa Inés	Sport 96
2008	Sport 96	
2009	Sport 96	Alianza Chaclacayo
2010	Alianza Chaclacayo	Huaracán Morón
2011	Huaracán Morón	Sport 96
2012	Escuela Rojas	
2013	Cultural Ñaña	Independiente Huampaní
2014	Deportivo Moriah	Escuela Rojas
2015	Sport 96	Asociación Chacrasana
2016	Deportivo Huascata	Asociación Chacrasana
2017	Deportivo Amistad	Deportivo Huascata
2018	Deportivo Huascata	Cultural Ñaña
2019	Cultural Ñaña	Unión Huampani
2020	Canceled due to the COVID-19 pandemic	
2021	Canceled due to the COVID-19 pandemic	
2022	La Era	Huracán Ñaña
2023	Atlético Morón	Deportivo Huascata
2024	Fraternidad Villa Rica	La Era
2025	La Era	Huracán Junior
2026	Nacional Cobian	Deportivo Huascata

=== Liga Distrital de Chorrillos ===
==== List of champions ====
- The District League was founded on August 8, 1960.

Season	Champion	Runner-up
2007	Defensor Tacalá	ETE
2008	Defensor Tacalá	Atlético Francia
2009	ETE	Boca Juniors
2010	Boca Juniors	Defensor Tacalá
2011	Defensor Tacalá	Deportivo Municipal
2012	Juventud América	Círculo Rojo
2013	Juventud América	Círculo Rojo
2014	Juventud América	Boca Juniors
2015	ETE	Estudiantes Argentina
2016	Juventud América	Boca Juniors
2017	Deportivo Municipal	Cultural Lima
2018	ETE	Deportivo Municipal
2019	Juventud América	ETE
2020	Canceled due to the COVID-19 pandemic	
2021	Canceled due to the COVID-19 pandemic	
2022	Cultural Lima	Huracán Chorrillos
2023	Cultural Lima	New Boys
2024	Huracán Chorrillos	FC Marcavelica
2025	FC Marcavelica	Cultural Lima
2026	FC Marcavelica	Deportivo Municipal

=== Liga Distrital de Chosica ===
==== List of champions ====
Season	Champion	Runner-up
2006	Juventud Apurímac	Deportivo Racing
2007	Juventud Apurímac	Juventud Moyopampa
2008	Independiente Chosica	Deportivo La Cantuta
2009	Atlético Trinchera	Academia San Antonio
2010	Independiente Chosica	Academia Los Reyes
2011	Defensor Rosario	Deportivo Racing
2012	Academia Los Reyes	Independiente de Deportes
2013	Juventud Moyopampa	Chosica FC
2014	Chosica FC	Juventud Moyopampa
2015	Deportivo Racing	River Plate
2016	Juventud Apurímac	Chosica FC
2017	Atlético Libertad	Independiente de Deportes
2018	Cantoro FC	Independiente San Antonio
2019	Juventud Moyopampa	Juventud Apurímac
2020	Canceled due to the COVID-19 pandemic	
2021	Canceled due to the COVID-19 pandemic	
2022	Juventud Apurímac	Nicolás de Piérola
2023	Chosica FC	Once Estrellas
2024	Deportivo Racing	Once Estrellas
2025	Juventud Apurímac	FC Felino
2026	Deportivo Racing	Las Favelas Santo Domingo

=== Liga Distrital de Cieneguilla ===
==== List of champions ====
Season	Champion	Runner-up
2007	Botafogo	Huracán
2009–10	No tournament	
2011	Inmaculada Libertad	Gremio
2012–20	Canceled due to the COVID-19 pandemic	
2021	Canceled due to the COVID-19 pandemic	
2022–23	No tournament	
2024	La Academia	La Libertad
2025	Athletic Blaz	Huracán
2026	La Libertad	Athletic Blaz

=== Liga Intradistrital de Collique ===
==== List of champions ====
Ed.	Season	Champion	Runner-up
1	2011	Collique FC	
2	2012	Liga V Zona	Sánchez Cerro
3	2013	Liga V Zona	Unión Pucará
4	2014	Liga V Zona	Unión Pucará
5	2015	Liga V Zona	San Isidro de Añay
6	2016	Unión Santa Rosa	Unión Pucará
7	2017	Unión Collique	Unión Santa Rosa
8	2018	Liga V Zona	Unión Collique
9	2019	Unión Collique	Liga V Zona
–	2020	Canceled due to the COVID-19 pandemic	
–	2021	Canceled due to the COVID-19 pandemic	
10	2022	Unión Collique	Liga V Zona
11	2023	Unión Collique	Paz Soldán
12	2024	Unión Collique	Universitario de Comas
13	2025	Unión Collique	Hijos de Canas
14	2026	Unión Collique	Universitario de Comas

=== Liga Distrital de Comas ===
==== List of champions ====
Season	Champion	Runner-up
2007	Cerro Comeño	Águilas de América
2009	Juventud Comas	Cultural Géminis
2010	Juventud Comas	Cultural Géminis
2011	Lima Norte	Cultural Comas
2012	Garra Comeña	Atlético Perú
2013	Atlético Perú	Deportivo Piérola
2014	Cultural Géminis	Cultural Comas
2015	Cultural Comas	Cultural Géminis
2016	Huracán Boys	Cultural Comas
2017	Cultural Géminis	Garra Comeña
2018	Cultural Comas	Cultural Géminis
2019	Cultural Géminis	Huracán Boys
2020	Canceled due to the COVID-19 pandemic	
2021	Canceled due to the COVID-19 pandemic	
2022	Juventud Comas	Huracán Boys
2023	Águilas de América	Amigos de Jesús
2024	2 de Mayo	Deportivo Piérola
2025	2 de Mayo	Cultural Géminis
2026	RG Contadores	2 de Mayo

=== Liga Distrital de El Agustino ===
==== List of champions ====
Season	Champion	Runner-up
2007	Defensor La Atarjea	Unión Estudiantil
2008	Santa Rosa El Ángel	
2009	Cultural Progreso	Martin Luther King
2010	Cultural Progreso	Unión Estudiantil
2011	Defensor Striker's	Cultural Progreso
2012	Defensor Striker's	Cultural Progreso
2013	Defensor Striker's	Cultural Progreso
2014	Unión Estudiantil	ADC
2015	Defensor Striker's	ADC
2016	Cultural Progreso	Defensor Striker's
2017	Defensor Striker's	Unión Estudiantil
2018	Defensor Striker's	Deportivo La Ribera
2019	Defensor Striker's	Deportivo La Ribera
2020	Canceled due to the COVID-19 pandemic	
2021	Canceled due to the COVID-19 pandemic	
2022	Cultural Progreso	Parques del Agustino
2023	Defensor Striker's	La Segunda
2024	Santa Rosa El Ángel	Parques del Agustino
2025	Parques del Agustino	Unión Estudiantil
2026	Parques del Agustino	Defensor La Atarjea

=== Liga Distrital de Huaycán ===
==== List of champions ====
Ed.	Season	Champion	Runner-up
1	2014	FC Furygangs	El Palomar
2	2015	Alianza Atlético FC	FC Furygangs
3	2016	Escuela Deportiva Cilcosa	FC Furygangs
4	2017	Academia Guiofa	Alianza Atlético FC
5	2018	Alianza Atlético FC	FC Furygangs
6	2019	Academia Guiofa	FC Furygangs
–	2020	Canceled due to the COVID-19 pandemic	
–	2021	Canceled due to the COVID-19 pandemic	
7	2022	FC Furygangs	Talentos Sport
8	2023	Academia Guiofa	Athletic Club Huáscar
9	2024	Academia Guiofa	FC Furygangs
10	2025	Talentos Sport	Academia Guiofa
11	2026	Alberto Líder	Academia Guiofa

=== Liga Distrital de Independencia ===
==== List of champions ====
Season	Champion	Runner-up
2007	Sporting Ermitaño	Dinámico Imperial
2008	Sporting Ermitaño	
2009	Sporting Ermitaño	Cultural Estudiantes
2010	Sporting Ermitaño	Cultural Estudiantes
2011	Cultural Estudiantes	Sport Estudiantil
2012	Cultural Estudiantes	Sporting Ermitaño
2013	AD Social	Cultural Estudiantes
2014	AD Social	Mauro Navarro
2015	Defensor Los Robles	Cultural Estudiantes
2016	Sport Latino	Defensor El Milagro
2017	Dinámico Imperial	Defensor El Milagro
2018	Dinámico Imperial	Sport Latino
2019	Dinámico Imperial	Sport Latino
2020	Canceled due to the COVID-19 pandemic	
2021	Canceled due to the COVID-19 pandemic	
2022	Dinámico Imperial	Sport Estudiantil
2023	Dinámico Imperial	Sánchez Carrión
2024	Once Caballeros	Atlético Cimarrón
2025	Independiente Sacachispas	Atlético Cimarrón
2026	Real Tahuantinsuyo	Social Huracán

=== Liga Distrital de Jesús María ===
==== List of champions ====
Season	Champion	Runner-up
2007	Galaxie 901	Arsenal
2009	Arsenal	Juventud Gloria
2010	Arsenal	Juventud Gloria
2011	Arsenal	Whiter Star
2012	Arsenal	Galaxie 901
2013	Galaxie 901	Arsenal
2014	Arsenal	White Star
2015	Arsenal	Galaxie 901
2016	Arsenal	Líderes de Jesús María
2017	Galaxie 901	Líderes de Jesús María
2018	Galaxie 901	Veterinaria FC
2019	Arsenal	Galaxie 901
2020	Canceled due to the COVID-19 pandemic	
2021	Canceled due to the COVID-19 pandemic	
2022	Arsenal	Deportivo Zela
2023	Arsenal Lawn Tennis	Galaxie 901
2024	Arsenal Lawn Tennis	Galaxie 901
2025	Arsenal Lawn Tennis	Atlético Minero
2026	Arsenal Lawn Tennis	Atlético Minero

=== Liga Distrital de La Molina ===
- The District League was founded on December 6, 1975.

==== List of champions ====
Season	Champion	Runner-up
2007	Deportivo Municipal	La Merced
2008	Sport Progreso Pumapuquio	Asociación Viña Alta
2009	Íntimos	Juventud Musa
2010	Íntimos	Ferreteros San José
2011	Sport Progreso Pumapuquio	Rinconada Country
2012	Santa Felicia	Sport Progreso Pumapuquio
2013	Sport Progreso Pumapuquio	Alianza Santa Cruz
2014	Sporting Libertad	Santa Felicia
2015	Alianza Santa Cruz	Juventud Musa
2016	Andrés Campeón	Rinconada Country
2017	Alianza Santa Cruz	Deportivo Zúñiga
2018	Rinconada Country	Sporting Libertad
2019	Andrés Campeón	Sport Progreso Pumapuquio
2020	Canceled due to the COVID-19 pandemic	
2021	Canceled due to the COVID-19 pandemic	
2022	Alianza Santa Cruz	Sport Roy's
2023	Sport Progreso Pumapuquio	Deportivo Zúñiga
2024	Sport Roy's	Viña Alta
2025	Sport Roy's	Asociación Viña Alta
2026	Deportivo Zúñiga	Patria Lima

=== Liga Distrital de La Victoria ===
==== List of champions ====
Season	Champion	Runner-up
2007	Unión Victoria	Cosmos 2001
2008	Trabajadores Industriales	Cosmos 2001
2009	Cosmos 2001	América Junior
2010	Cosmos 2001	América Junior
2011	Cosmos 2001	América Junior
2012	Cosmos 2001	Real Madrid
2013	Cosmos 2001	Real Madrid
2014	América Junior	Unión Victoria
2015	América Junior	Atlético Los Diamantes
2016	América Junior	Unión Victoria
2017	Independiente Nueva Lima	Unión Victoria
2018	América Junior	Independiente Nueva Lima
2019	Independiente Nueva Lima	Unión Misti
2020	Canceled due to the COVID-19 pandemic	
2021	Canceled due to the COVID-19 pandemic	
2022	Independiente Nueva Lima	Unión Misti
2023	Cosmos 2001	Unión Misti
2024	Mariscal Sucre	Unión Misti
2025	Cosmos 2001	Pedro A. Labarthe
2026	Cosmos 2001	Pedro A. Labarthe

=== Liga Distrital de Lince ===
The Liga Distrital de Los Olivos was founded on March 24, 1975.

==== List of champions ====
Season	Champion	Runner-up
2007	Auroco	Academia Puerto Chala
2008	Sport Lince	AD Lari
2009	Asociación Caly	Academia Casta
2010	AD Lari	Centro Representativo Casta
2011	San Agustín	AD Lari
2012	San Agustín	Asociación Caly
2013	San Agustín	Asociación Caly
2014	San Agustín	Academia Casta
2015	San Agustín	Real Santa Beatriz
2016	San Agustín	Real Santa Beatriz
2017	Academia Casta	Academia Puerto Chala
2018	Academia Puerto Chala	AD Lari
2019	Academia Casta	Academia Puerto Chala
2020	Canceled due to the COVID-19 pandemic	
2021	Canceled due to the COVID-19 pandemic	
2022	AD Lari	Pegaso FC
2023	Academia Casta	Pegaso FC
2024	Academia Puerto Chala	AD Lari
2025	Academia Puerto Chala	AD Lari
2026	Vendaval Celeste	Real Sacachispas

=== Liga Distrital de Los Olivos ===
The Liga Distrital de Los Olivos was founded on May 5, 1989.

==== List of champions ====
Season	Champion	Runner-up
2007	El Buen Pastor	Nueva Generación
2008	Nueva Generación	
2009	Nueva Generación	Juventud Naranjal
2010	Nueva Generación	Juventud Naranjal
2011	Unión Cayaltí	Nueva Generación
2012	UCSS	Alianza Naranjal
2013	UCSS	Grupo Héctor Chumpitaz
2014	UCSS	Las Águilas de Santa Ana
2015	Alianza Naranjal	Grupo Héctor Chumpitaz
2016	Las Águilas de Santa Ana	UCSS
2017	Unión Mercurio Alto	Grupo Héctor Chumpitaz
2018	Unión Mercurio Alto	Las Águilas de Santa Ana
2019	Unión Mercurio Alto	Las Águilas de Santa Ana
2020	Canceled due to the COVID-19 pandemic	
2021	Canceled due to the COVID-19 pandemic	
2022	Alianza Naranjal	Unión Mercurio Alto
2023	Alianza Naranjal	La Gran Familia
2024	Alianza Naranjal	La Gran Familia
2025	Cachorros Naranjal	Fútbol Training
2026	Cachorros Naranjal	Alianza Naranjal

=== Liga Distrital de Lurín ===
==== List of champions ====
Season	Champion	Runner-up
2007	Virgen de las Mercedes	Racing Lurín
2008	Palomillas del Barrio	Ramón Castilla
2009	Ramón Castilla	Palomillas del Barrio
2010	Universitario Nuevo Lurín	Cruzeiro
2011	Universitario Nuevo Lurín	Cruzeiro
2012	Aguerridos	Juventud Lurín
2013	Social Audaces	Deportivo Mamani
2014	Social Audaces	ABC Estudiantes
2015	Social Audaces	Simón Bolívar
2016	Simón Bolívar	Social Audaces
2017	Juventud Lurín	Simón Bolívar
2018	Social Audaces	Simón Bolívar
2019	Ramón Castilla	Sport Arica
2020	Canceled due to the COVID-19 pandemic	
2021	Canceled due to the COVID-19 pandemic	
2022	No tournament	
2023	Social Audaces	Ramón Castilla
2024	Las Águilas de Punta Hermosa	Social Audaces
2025	Social Audaces	Simón Bolívar
2026	Social Audaces	Las Águilas de Punta Hermosa

=== Liga Distrital de Magdalena del Mar ===
==== List of champions ====
Season	Champion	Runner-up
2007	Defensor Arica Magdalena	Junior Nike
2008	Defensor Arica Magdalena	JLM Baroman
2009	Huracán Junior	Deportivo Sairam
2010	Defensor Arica Magdalena	Academia Casta
2011	Defensor Arica Magdalena	Huracán Junior
2012	Defensor Arica Magdalena	Junior Nike
2013	Municipal de Magdalena	Huracán Magdalena
2014	Municipal de Magdalena	Deportivo Riquelme
2015	Municipal de Magdalena	Huracán Junior
2016	Municipal de Magdalena	Defensor Arica Magdalena
2017	Defensor Arica Magdalena	Municipal de Magdalena
2018	Municipal de Magdalena	San Simón
2019	Dream Team	Defensor Arica Magdalena
2020	Canceled due to the COVID-19 pandemic	
2021	Canceled due to the COVID-19 pandemic	
2022	Municipal de Magdalena	Defensor Arica Magdalena
2023	Defensor Arica Magdalena	Que Ruede el Balón
2024	Municipal de Magdalena	San Simón
2025	Jirón Miraflores	Municipal de Magdalena
2026	Jirón Miraflores	Defensor Arica Magdalena

=== Liga Distrital de Miraflores ===
- The District League was founded in 1974.

==== List of champions ====
Season	Champion	Runner-up
2007	DIM	Liz Dent
2008	Liz Dent	DIM
2009	DIM	Juventud Francia
2010	Asociación Miraflores	Liz Dent
2011	DIM	Liz Dent
2012	DIM	Academia Álex Cornejo
2013	DIM	Academia Álex Cornejo
2014	DIM	Liz Dent
2015	DIM	ADC Jungla
2016	San Vicente de Paúl	Juventud Francia
2017	DIM	San Vicente de Paúl
2018	DIM	ADC Jungla
2019	DIM	AFIS
2020	Canceled due to the COVID-19 pandemic	
2021	Canceled due to the COVID-19 pandemic	
2022	DIM	Liz Dent
2023	AD El Diamante	ADC Jungla
2024	AD El Diamante	ADC Jungla
2025	MIVA	ADC Jungla
2026	AD El Diamante	MIVA

=== Liga Distrital de Pachacámac ===
==== List of champions ====
Season	Champion	Runner-up
2007	Unión Pachacámac	Juventud Quebrada Verde
2009	Juventud Quebrada Verde	Alfonso Ugarte
2010	Independiente Guayabo	Real Atocongo
2011	Sport Juvenil	Independiente Guayabo
2012	Real Atocongo	Las Palmas
2013	Unión Pachacámac	Alfonso Ugarte
2014	Unión Pachacámac	Junior de Manchay
2015	Juventud Quebrada Verde	Junior de Manchay
2016	Juventud Quebrada Verde	Junior de Manchay
2017	Independiente Guayabo	Sport Juvenil
2018	Unión Pachacámac	San Fernando
2019	Independiente Guayabo	Junior de Manchay
2020	Canceled due to the COVID-19 pandemic	
2021	Canceled due to the COVID-19 pandemic	
2022	San Fernando	Defensor José Gálvez
2023	Juventud Quebrada Verde	Junior de Manchay
2024	Juventud Quebrada Verde	Junior de Manchay
2025	Real Atocongo	Alfonso Ugarte
2026	Junior de Manchay	Fluminense

=== Liga Distrital de Pueblo Libre ===
==== List of champions ====
Season	Champion	Runner-up
2007	AELU	Pedro Murillo
2009	AELU	Inkas Lima
2010	AELU	Inkas Lima
2011	Sport Marsella	AELU
2012	AELU	Inkas Lima
2013	Cultural San Marcos	AELU
2014	AELU	CAM
2015	AELU	Sport Marsella
2016	AELU	Deportivo Huanta
2017	AELU	Deportivo Huanta
2018	AELU	Deportivo Huanta
2019	AELU	Atlético Zaragoza
2020	Canceled due to the COVID-19 pandemic	
2021	Canceled due to the COVID-19 pandemic	
2022	AELU	
2023	AELU	Lima City
2024	AELU	Lima City
2025	Estrella Azul	AELU
2026	Estrella Azul	Fuerza Ganadora SC

=== Liga Distrital de Puente Piedra ===
==== List of champions ====
Season	Champion	Runner-up
2007	Barcelona	Deportivo Municipal
2008	Barcelona	Deportivo Municipal
2009	Francisco Bolognesi	La Molina
2010	Deportivo Municipal	Alejandro Zevallos
2011	Defensor Santa Rosa	La Molina
2012	Defensor Santa Rosa	Futuro Sport
2013	Francisco Bolognesi	La Molina
2014	Defensor Santa Rosa	Futuro Sport
2015	La Molina	Defensor Santa Rosa
2016	Francisco Bolognesi	Juventud Atlanta
2017	Santo Tomás	Alejandro Zevallos
2018	La Molina	Francisco Bolognesi
2019	EF Juventus	Cultural Poeta
2020	Canceled due to the COVID-19 pandemic	
2021	Canceled due to the COVID-19 pandemic	
2022	Atlético Laderas	EF Juventus
2023	Juventud Alameda del Norte	San Lorenzo
2024	San Judas Tadeo	AFA La Ensenada
2025	San Judas Tadeo	Ingenio Puente Piedra
2026	Independiente Gallinazos	Deportivo Municipal

=== Liga Distrital de Punta Hermosa ===
==== List of champions ====
Season	Champion	Runner-up
2016	Estudiantes	Sport Piura
2017	Estudiantes	Sport Piura
2018	Estudiantes	Juventud Lurín
2019	Danger's	Soccer Performance
2020	Canceled due to the COVID-19 pandemic	
2021	Canceled due to the COVID-19 pandemic	
2022	Internacional Lurín	Soccer Performance
2023–26	No tournament	

=== Liga Distrital de Punta Negra ===
==== List of champions ====
Season	Champion	Runner-up
2007	Black Point	Deportivo Milán
2008	No tournament	
2009	La Argolla	Costa Azul
2010	Costa Azul	La Argolla
2011	Costa Azul	La Argolla
2012	La Argolla	Costa Azul
2013	Los Bull's	La Argolla
2014	Los Bull's	Unión Milán
2015	Los Bull's	Costa Azul
2016	Los Bull's	La Argolla
2017	Los Bull's	Costa Azul
2018	La Argolla	Los Bull's
2019	No tournament	
2020	Canceled due to the COVID-19 pandemic	
2021	Canceled due to the COVID-19 pandemic	
2022–26	No tournament	

=== Liga Distrital de Rímac ===
==== List of champions ====
Season	Champion	Runner-up
2007	Alianza Pizarro	Atlanta Altillo
2008	Alianza Pizarro	Arsenal
2009	Alianza Pizarro	Atlanta Altillo
2010	Alianza Pizarro	CADRE
2011	Alianza Pizarro	Atlético Totorita
2012	CADRE	Atlético Totoritas
2013	Real Aromito	Alianza Pizarro
2014	Real Aromito	Alianza Pizarro
2015	Alianza Pizarro	Atlético Totorita
2016	Atlético Totorita	Real Aromito
2017	Atlético Totorita	Alianza Pizarro
2018	Alianza Pizarro	Unidad Paita
2019	Unidad Paita	Olimpya de Campeones
2020	Canceled due to the COVID-19 pandemic	
2021	Canceled due to the COVID-19 pandemic	
2022	Alianza Pizarro	Defensor Manuel Gonzales Prada
2023	Olimpya de Campeones	All Stars
2024	Unidad Paita	Unidad Vecinal
2025	Olimpya de Campeones	Unidad Vecinal
2026	Olimpya de Campeones	Unidad Vecinal

=== Liga Distrital de San Bartolo ===
==== List of champions ====
Season	Champion	Runner-up
2007	Racing	San Cristóbal
2008	Racing	
2009	Racing	Estudiantes
2010	New Old Boys	Villa Mercedes
2011	Social Atlanta	Racing
2012	Social Atlanta	New Old Boys
2013	No Tournament	
2014	Juventud San Bartolo	San Cristóbal
2015	Social Atlanta	San Cristóbal
2016	San Cristóbal	Social Atlanta
2017	San Cristóbal	Alfonso Ugarte
2018	Social Atlanta	San Cristóbal
2019	Social Atlanta	San Cristóbal
2020	Canceled due to the COVID-19 pandemic	
2021	Canceled due to the COVID-19 pandemic	
2022	No Tournament	
2023	Nuevo Municipal	San Cristóbal
2024	San Cristóbal	Águilas de Chacña
2025	San Cristóbal	El Káiser
2026	San Cristóbal	Racing

=== Liga Distrital de San Borja ===
==== List of champions ====
Season	Champion	Runner-up
2007	San Juan Masías	Santa Rosa
2009	Deport San Borja	Real Primavera
2010	Deport San Borja	Santa Rosa
2011	Torres de Limbatambo	Deport San Borja
2012	Juventud Santa Rosa	Deport San Borja
2013	San Francisco de Borja	Academia Tito Drago
2014	Deport San Borja	Sport Cobresol
2015	Rosella Remar	Juventud Santa Rosa
2016	Rosella Remar	Juventud Santa Rosa
2017	Rosella Remar	Deport San Borja
2018	Rosella Remar	Sport Cobresol
2019	Nuevo Santa Rosa	Juventud Santa Rosa
2020	Canceled due to the COVID-19 pandemic	
2021	Canceled due to the COVID-19 pandemic	
2022	Sport Cobresol	San Francisco de Borja
2023	San Francisco de Borja	Juventud Santa Rosa
2024	Sport Cobresol	Juventud Santa Rosa
2025	Juventud Santa Rosa	Sport Cobresol
2026	Callegari Mubarak	Juventud Santa Rosa

=== Liga Distrital de San Isidro ===
- The District League was founded on August 8, 1957.

==== List of champions ====
Season	Champion	Runner-up
1963	Deportivo Castellano	Deportivo Bancoper
1964	Deportivo Bancoper	
1965	Racing	
1966	Deportivo Bancoper	
1967	Deportivo Nacional	Deportivo Bancoper
1968	Huracán San Isidro	
1969	Deportivo Nacional	
1970	Defensor San Borja	
1971	Deportivo Bancoper	
1972	Universidad San Marcos	Deportivo Helvético
1973	Deportivo Helvético	Atlético Huracán
1974	Defensor San Borja	Atlético Huracán
1975	Deportivo Bancoper	Mariscal Sucre
2007	Lima Cricket	Regatas Lima
2008	Lima Cricket	Regatas Lima
2009	Regatas Lima	Lima Cricket
2010	Regatas Lima	Lima Cricket
2011	Ciclista Lima FC	Lima Cricket
2012	Lima Cricket	Ciclista Lima FC
2013	Regatas Lima	Circolo Sportivo Italiano
2014	Regatas Lima	Ciclista Lima FC
2015	ADN Sportivo SAC FMV	Circolo Sportivo Italiano
2016	Lima Cricket	Ciclista Lima FC
2017	Ciclista Lima FC	Real Club de Lima
2018	Inmaculada Apremasur	Universidad Garcilaso
2019	Regatas Lima	Inmaculada Apremasur
2020	Canceled due to the COVID-19 pandemic	
2021	Canceled due to the COVID-19 pandemic	
2022	Regatas Lima	Circolo Sportivo Italiano
2023	Regatas Lima	Circolo Sportivo Italiano
2024	Circolo Sportivo Italiano	Regatas Lima
2025	Inmaculada Apremasur	Universidad San Martín
2026	Inmaculada Apremasur	Universidad San Martín

=== Liga Distrital de San Juan de Lurigancho ===
==== List of champions ====
Season	Champion	Runner-up
2007	Juventud Chacarilla	Alianza Canto Grande
2008	Atlético Piedra Liza	American Star
2009	Juventud Chacarilla	Estrella Roja
2010	Estrella Roja	Academia Espinoza
2011	Alianza Canto Grande	Estrella Roja
2012	Semillero Canto Grande	Academia Espinoza
2013	Semillero Canto Grande	Estrella Roja
2014	Alianza Canto Grande	Defensor SJL Victorias
2015	Sporting Carrera San Juan	Alianza Canto Grande
2016	Alianza Canto Grande	Estrella Roja
2017	Defensor SJL Victorias	Estrella Roja
2018	Estrella Roja	Defensor Lubricantes
2019	Defensor Lubricantes	Estrella Roja
2020	Canceled due to the COVID-19 pandemic	
2021	Canceled due to the COVID-19 pandemic	
2022	Defensor Lubricantes	Dream Team Sports
2023	Estrella Roja	Defensor Lubricantes
2024	Estrella Roja	Defensor SJL Victorias
2025	Defensor Lubricantes	Academia Espinoza
2026	Academia Espinoza	Defensor Lubricantes

=== Liga Distrital de San Juan de Miraflores ===
==== List of champions ====
Season	Champion	Runner-up
2007	Atlético San Juan	Los Íntimos San Francisco
2008	Atlético San Juan	Los Algarrobos
2009	Los Algarrobos	Los Íntimos San Francisco
2010	Cultural San Juan	Unión San Martín
2011	Cultural 13 de Enero	Ciclón FC
2012	Cultural 13 de Enero	Ciclón FC
2013	Los Íntimos de Alemania Federal	Atlético San Juan
2014	Aberio Cia. Milán	Atlético San Juan
2015	Los Íntimos de Alemania Federal	Arturo Suárez
2016	Atlético San Juan	Cultural 13 de Enero
2017	Escuela Milán	Los Leones de Agua Viva
2018	Cultural 13 de Enero	Los Íntimos de Alemania Federal
2019	Escuela Milán	Deportivo Talleres
2020	Canceled due to the COVID-19 pandemic	
2021	Canceled due to the COVID-19 pandemic	
2022	Atlético San Juan	Santa Rosa
2023	Cultural 13 de Enero	Los Íntimos de Alemania Federal
2024	Cultural 13 de Enero	Cultural Inmaculada
2025	Los Íntimos de Alemania Federal	Santa Rosa
2026	Cultural 13 de Enero	Coresami FC

=== Liga Distrital de San Luis ===
==== List of champions ====
Season	Champion	Runner-up
2007	Wilson Informáticos	Integración San Luis
2009	Los Osos de Limatambo	Wilson Informáticos
2010	Cosmos Villa Jardín	River Plate
2011	River Plate	ADC Valdivieso
2012	Independiente Jorge Chávez	Cosmos Villa Jardín
2013	Lucero Junior	River Plate
2014	U América	ADC Valdivieso
2015	Independiente Jorge Chávez	Juventud Unida
2016	Juventud Unida	U América
2017	Juvenil San Juan de Balsas	Independiente Jorge Chávez
2018	Juvenil San Juan de Balsas	River Plate
2019	Defensor Los Sauces	Integración San Luis
2020	Canceled due to the COVID-19 pandemic	
2021	Canceled due to the COVID-19 pandemic	
2022	Integración San Luis	Defensor Los Sauces
2023	Juvenil San Juan de Balsas	Rayma FC
2024	Juventud Unida	Juventud Durand
2025	Defensor Los Sauces	Rayma FC
2026	Juventud Durand	Escuela Formativa Sicuani

=== Liga Distrital de San Martín de Porres ===
==== List of champions ====
Season	Champion	Runner-up
2007	Asociación Alameda 3	Deportivo Barboncito
2008	Minerva Deportes	Real Olímpico
2009	Santa Cruz	Santa Fe
2010	Pacífico	Real Olímpico
2011	Atlético Peruano Junior's	Pacífico
2012	Juventud Santo Toribio	UP4A
2013	Santa Fe	CSD Pacífico
2014	Juventud Santo Toribio	CSD Pacífico
2015	Social Pacífico	AD Solidaridad
2016	AD Solidaridad	Santa Fe
2017	AD Solidaridad	UP4A
2018	Cultural San Martín	AD Solidaridad
2019	AD Solidaridad	Real Estrella
2020	Canceled due to the COVID-19 pandemic	
2021	Canceled due to the COVID-19 pandemic	
2022	AD Solidaridad	Santa Cruz
2023	Virgen de Guadalupe	Atlético Relámpago
2024	Pacífico	Deportivo Esmeralda
2025	Atlético Relámpago	Virgen de Guadalupe
2026	Pacífico	Potrillos SMP

=== Liga Distrital de San Miguel ===
==== List of champions ====
Season	Champion	Runner-up
2007	Barcelona Miramar	Deportivo Libertad
2009	Barcelona Miramar	Independiente César Vallejo
2010	Barcelona Miramar	La Esquina del Movimiento
2011	Barcelona Miramar	Leoncio Prado
2012	La Esquina del Movimiento	Barcelona Miramar
2013	La Esquina del Movimiento	Guillermo César Flores Illescas
2014	Alianza Maranga	La Esquina del Movimiento
2015	Independiente César Vallejo	Juventud Zela
2016	La Esquina del Movimiento	Juventud Zela
2017	Independiente César Vallejo	Real Macarena
2018	Juventud Zela	Independiente César Vallejo
2019	Independiente César Vallejo	Juventud Zela
2020	Canceled due to the COVID-19 pandemic	
2021	Canceled due to the COVID-19 pandemic	
2022	Juventud Zela	Guillermo César Flores Illescas
2023	Juventud Zela	Independiente César Vallejo
2024	Juventud Zela	Independiente César Vallejo
2025	Juventud Zela	Barcelona Miramar
2026	Barcelona Miramar	Deportivo Libertad

=== Liga Distrital de Santa Anita ===
==== List of champions ====
Season	Champion	Runner-up
2007	Benjamin Doig	Diablos Rojos
2008	Los Terribles	American Star
2009	Los Terribles	Virgen de Chapi
2010	Diablos Rojos	San Pablo Hongos
2011	Furia Universal	Halcones de Viña
2012	Diablos Rojos	Estudiantes Los Ficus
2013	Nueva Esperanza	Estudiantes Los Ficus
2014	Nueva Esperanza	Los Terribles
2015	Nueva Esperanza	Los Terribles
2016	Estrella Roja	Virgen de Chapi
2017	Virgen de Guadalupe	Ernesto Che Guevara
2018	Virgen de Chapi	Estrella Roja
2019	Furia Universal	Ernesto Che Guevara
2020	Canceled due to the COVID-19 pandemic	
2021	Canceled due to the COVID-19 pandemic	
2022	Ernesto Che Guevara	Halcones de Viña
2023	Halcones de Viña	Ernesto Che Guevara
2024	Virgen de Chapi	Ernesto Che Guevara
2025	Cultural Molles	Estrella Roja
2026	Defensor Universal	La Peña Sporting

=== Liga Distrital de Santiago de Surco ===
==== List of champions ====
Season	Champion	Runner-up
2007	San Martín	Francisco Bolognesi
2009	Juventud La Rural	Universidad Ricardo Palma
2010	San Martín	Toribio Anyarín
2011	Toribio Anyarín	Nuevo Municipal
2012	Toribio Anyarín	Somos Olímpico
2013	Nuevo Municipal	Escuela Racing
2014	Juventud Talana	Somos Olímpico
2015	Somos Olímpico	Juventud Talana
2016	Somos Olímpico	Social Arica Junior
2017	Somos Olímpico	Semillero Somos Perú
2018	Somos Olímpico	Escuela Racing
2019	Somos Olímpico	Selección de Surco
2020	Canceled due to the COVID-19 pandemic	
2021	Canceled due to the COVID-19 pandemic	
2022	Somos Olímpico	Maxtrot
2023	Maxtrot	Real Amistad
2024	Juventud Talana	Cultural Talana
2025	Selección de Surco	Juventud Talana
2026	Juventud Talana	San Martín

=== Liga Distrital de Surquillo ===
==== List of champions ====
Season	Champion	Runner-up
1981	Juventud San Diego	
1982	Juventud San Diego	
1986	San José de Calasanz	
1987	Good Year	
1989	Atlético Millonarios	
1990	Ciclista Alianza Miraflores	
1991	Ciclista Alianza Miraflores	
1992	Carlos Moscoso	
1993	Deportivo Chabros	
1994	Deportivo Cadet	
1995	Deportivo Chabros	
1997	Universidad de Lima	
1999	Deportivo Chabros	
2000	Universidad de Lima	
2001	Deportivo Chabros	
2002	Universidad de Lima	
2003	Universidad de Lima	Deportivo Chabros
2004	Deportivo Chabros	
2005	Deportivo Colina	Real San Felipe
2006	Universidad de Lima	Deportivo Colina
2007	Universidad de Lima	Carlos Moscoso
2008	Real San Felipe	Deportivo Colina
2009	Rocca Camaleón	New Surquillo
2010	New Surquillo	El Pacífico
2011	Rocca Camaleón	Real San Felipe
2012	Carlos Moscoso	Rocca Camaleón
2013	Deportivo Idóneo	Deportivo Colina
2014	San Agustín de Cajas	Unión Surquillo
2015	Deportivo Idóneo	San Agustín de Cajas
2016	Deportivo Idóneo	AFE Cosmos Internacional
2017	AFE Cosmos Internacional	Deportivo Colina
2018	AFE Cosmos Internacional	Estudiantes La Calera
2019	Estudiantes La Calera	AFE Cosmos Internacional
2020	Canceled due to the COVID-19 pandemic	
2021	Canceled due to the COVID-19 pandemic	
2022	AFE Cosmos Internacional	Real San Felipe
2023	AFE Cosmos Internacional	Real San Felipe
2024	AFE Cosmos Internacional	Real San Felipe
2025	AFE Cosmos Internacional	Arroyito FC
2026	Surquillo FC	AFE Cosmos Internacional

=== Liga Distrital de Villa El Salvador ===
==== List of champions ====
Season	Champion	Runner-up
2007	Raymondi Cashapampa	Revolución Progreso
2008	Raymondi Cashapampa	
2009	Raymondi Cashapampa	Sport Inca
2010	Revolución Progreso	Deporcentro Sol
2011	Arriba Perú	Estudiantes Unidos
2012	Atlético Salvador	Alianza Libertad
2013	Cultural Progreso	Arriba Perú
2014	Cultural Progreso	Asociación Cosmos
2015	Cultural Progreso	Asociación Cosmos
2016	Arriba Perú	Cultural Progreso
2017	Asociación Cosmos	Nueva Juventud
2018	Arriba Huracán	Vamos Unicachi
2019	Arriba Huracán	Estudiantes Unidos
2020	Canceled due to the COVID-19 pandemic	
2021	Canceled due to the COVID-19 pandemic	
2022	Asociación Cosmos	Nueva Generación
2023	Asociación Cosmos	TEPRO
2024	Nueva Juventud	Atlético Salvador
2025	Estudiantes Unidos	Arriba Huracán
2026	Nueva Juventud	Arriba Huracán

=== Liga Distrital de Villa María del Triunfo ===
==== List of champions ====
Season	Champion	Runner-up
2007	Atlético Jardín	El Sol
2008	Precursores	
2009	Deportivo Jardín	Jorge Chávez
2010	Real Unión	Estrellas del Norte
2011	Deportivo Jardín	Precursores
2012	Deportivo Jardín	Atlético Jardín
2013	Deportivo Jardín	Atlético Jardín
2014	Jorge Chávez	Deportivo Jardín
2015	Real Unión	Deportivo Jardín
2016	Hender Morales	Real Unión
2017	Deportivo Jardín	Jorge Chávez
2018	Deportivo Jardín	Real Unión
2019	Hender Morales	Real Unión
2020	Canceled due to the COVID-19 pandemic	
2021	Canceled due to the COVID-19 pandemic	
2022	Deportivo Jardín	Real Unión
2023	Deportivo Jardín	Juniors de América
2024	Juniors de América	Vecinos y Amigos
2025	Vecinos y Amigos	Unión Juventud
2026	Juniors de América	Unión Juventud

=== Liga Intradistrital de Canto Grande ===
==== List of champions ====
Ed.	Season	Champion	Runner-up
1	2011	Chacarita Juniors	Deportivo Nápoles
2	2012	Los Pinos	Sport Bengala
3	2013	Chacarita Juniors	Atlético Cajamarquilla
4	2014	Chacarita Juniors	Deportivo Nápoles
5	2015	Deportivo Bayovar	San Martín Junior SJL
6	2016	Chacarita Juniors	Santa Rita de Casia
7	2017	Atlético Sairam	Santa Rita de Casia
8	2018	Deportivo Satélite	Atlético Sairam
9	2019	Atlético Sairam	Santa Rita de Casia
–	2020	Canceled due to the COVID-19 pandemic	
–	2021	Canceled due to the COVID-19 pandemic	
10	2022	Sport Bengala	Deportivo Satélite
11	2023	Defensor Parque Los Ficus	Deportivo Nápoles
12	2024	Defensor Parque Los Ficus	Chacarita Juniors
13	2025	Defensor Parque Los Ficus	Simplemente Motupe
14	2026	Defensor Parque Los Ficus	Simplemente Motupe

=== Liga Intradistrital de José Carlos Mariategui ===
==== List of champions ====
Ed.	Season	Champion	Runner-up
1	2012	Naranja Diablos	Los Chéveres
2	2013	Los Chéveres	Naranja Diablos
3	2014	Real Nápoles	Los Chéveres
4	2015	Los Chéveres	Inter del Chifa
–	2016	No tournament	
5	2017	Los Chéveres	Real Nápoles
6	2018	Atlético Tingo María	ESFER
7	2019	ESFER	Atlético Tingo María
–	2020	Canceled due to the COVID-19 pandemic	
–	2021	Canceled due to the COVID-19 pandemic	
8	2022	Kurmi Soccer Juniors	ESFER
9	2023	ESFER	Purito San Gabriel
10	2024	Purito San Gabriel	Kurmi Soccer Juniors
11	2025	Kurmi Soccer Juniors	Purito San Gabriel
11	2026	Sport Villa	Juventud Melgar

=== Liga Intradistrital de Mateo Pumacahua ===
==== List of champions ====
Ed.	Season	Champion	Runner-up
1	2025	Jockey FC	CEAR FC
2	2026	Internacional Sporting	Poetas Sport

=== Liga Intradistrital de Nuevo San Juan ===
==== List of champions ====
Ed.	Season	Champion	Runner-up
1	2026	Chacarita Juniors	Real Madrid

== Lima Provincias ==
=== Liga Distrital de Barranca ===
==== List of champions ====
Season	Champion	Runner-up
2008	Santa Catalina	Sport América
2009	Alianza Aurora	Juventud Olivar
2010	Alianza Aurora	Juventud 9 de Diciembre
2011	Alianza Aurora	Pampa de Lara
2012	Deportivo El Potao	Alianza Aurora
2013	Mariscal Santa Cruz	Deportivo El Potao
2014	Deportivo Cosmos	Alianza Aurora
2015	Defensor Seminario	Alianza Aurora
2016	Alianza Aurora	Juventud 9 de Diciembre
2017	Mariscal Santa Cruz	Deportivo Cosmos
2018	Defensor Cenicero	Mariscal Santa Cruz
2019	Deportivo Cosmos	Estrella Roja
2020	Canceled due to the COVID-19 pandemic	
2021	Canceled due to the COVID-19 pandemic	
2022	Defensor Cenicero	Juventud Zavala
2023	Nueva Generación	Juventud Arguay
2024	Deportivo Huracán	Estrella Roja
2025	Nueva Generación	Deportivo El Potao
2026	Deportivo El Potao	Nueva Generación

=== Liga Distrital de Chancay ===
==== List of champions ====
Season	Champion	Runner-up
2008	Norte Peralvillo	Alfonso Ugarte
2009	Norte Peralvillo	Defensor Peralvillo
2010	Defensor Peralvillo	Juventud Chancay
2011	Defensor Los Tilos	Miguel Grau
2012	Defensor Los Tilos	Miguel Grau
2013	Defensor Los Tilos	Juventud Torre Blanca
2014	Aurora Chancayllo	Defensor Los Tilos
2015	Juventud 2001 Chancayllo	Defensor Laure Sur
2016	Alianza Las Salinas	Juventud 2001 Chancayllo
2017	Defensor Laure Sur	Sport San Juan
2018	Norte Peralvillo	Aurora Chancayllo
2019	Alfonso Ugarte	Circolo Pampa Libre
2020	Canceled due to the COVID-19 pandemic	
2021	Canceled due to the COVID-19 pandemic	
2022	Juventud 2001 Chancayllo	Sport Santa Rosa
2023	Norte Peralvillo	Juventud Torre Blanca
2024	Vasco da Gama	Alianza Las Salinas
2025	ASA	Vasco da Gama
2026	AD San Marcos	Sport Santa Rosa

=== Liga Distrital de Cerro Azul ===
==== List of champions ====
Ed.	Season	Champion	Runner-up
1	2008	CANECA	Bella Esperanza
2	2009	Scratch Nuevo Cerro Azul	Los Curiosos
3	2010	Bella Esperanza	Los Curiosos
4	2011	Jorge Chávez	Bella Esperanza
5	2012	Bella Esperanza	Jorge Chávez
6	2013	Bella Esperanza	Jorge Chávez
7	2014	KDT Cerro Azul	Bella Esperanza
8	2015	Bella Esperanza	Jorge Chávez
9	2016	Bella Esperanza	Academia Los Delfines
10	2017	Academia Los Delfines	Bella Esperanza
11	2018	Bella Esperanza	Jorge Chávez
12	2019	Bella Esperanza	Jorge Chávez
–	2020	Canceled due to the COVID-19 pandemic	
–	2021	Canceled due to the COVID-19 pandemic	
13	2022	Los Fanatic's	Esmeralda FBC
14	2023	Jorge Chávez	Bella Esperanza
15	2024	Bella Esperanza	Deportivo Puente Tabla
16	2025	Bella Esperanza	Jorge Chávez
17	2026	Bella Esperanza	Los Fanatic's

=== Liga Distrital de Huacho ===
==== List of champions ====
Season	Champion	Runner-up
2009	Juventud Barranco	Pedro Anselmo Bazalar
2010	Juventud Barranco	Pedro Anselmo Bazalar
2011	Pedro Anselmo Bazalar	Venus
2012	Venus	Pedro Anselmo Bazalar
2013	Venus	Juventud Barranco
2014	Venus	Juventud Barranco
2015	Venus	Juventud La Palma
2016	Juventud Galicia	Venus
2017	Juventud Barranco	Juventud Galicia
2018	UNJFSC	Venus
2019	Juventud Panana	Nicolás de Piérola
2020	Canceled due to the COVID-19 pandemic	
2021	Canceled due to the COVID-19 pandemic	
2022	UNJFSC	Tito Drago
2023	Nicolás de Piérola	Maristas
2024	Tito Drago	Juventud Cono Sur
2025	San José de Manzanares	ONG Racchumick
2026	Juventud Cono Sur	Pedro Anselmo Bazalar

=== Liga Distrital de Huaral ===
==== List of champions ====
Season	Champion	Runner-up
2008	Santa Rosa La Quincha	Benjamín Vizquerra
2009	Unión Huaral	Juventud Liberal
2010	Juventud Naturales	Santa Rosa La Quincha
2011	Unión Huaral	Social La Huaca
2012	Unión Huaral	Juventud Los Naturales
2013	Unión Huaral	Chacarita Huando
2014	San Martín de Retes	Sociedad Agrícola
2015	Social La Huaca	Unión Huaral B
2016	Santa Rosa La Quincha	Atlético Esquivel
2017	Social La Huaca	Unión Huaral B
2018	Social La Huaca	Alianza Huayán
2019	Credicoop Huaral	Huaralinos Juniors
2020	Canceled due to the COVID-19 pandemic	
2021	Canceled due to the COVID-19 pandemic	
2022	Benjamín Vizquerra	América El Trébol
2023	Chacarita Huando	Deportivo Palpa
2024	Deportivo Palpa	Chacarita Caqui
2025	Chacarita Caqui	Deportivo Palpa
2026	Juventud Naturales	Chacarita Caqui

=== Liga Distrital de Imperial ===
==== List of champions ====
Season	Champion	Runner-up
2003	Defensor Carmen Alto	
2004	Defensor Carmen Alto	Matices Ciclo
2005	Matices Ciclo	
2006	Matices Ciclo	
2007	Matices Ciclo	Walter Ormeño
2008	Matices Ciclo	Walter Ormeño
2009	Matices Ciclo	Defensor Del Conde
2010	Matices Ciclo	Defensor Carmen Alto
2011	Matices Ciclo	San Isidro
2012	Walter Ormeño	Matices Ciclo
2013	Matices Ciclo	Defensor Del Conde
2014	Atlético GALE	Matices Ciclo
2015	Defensor Carmen Alto	Círculo Deportivo Sucre
2016	Walter Ormeño	Matices Ciclo
2017	Walter Ormeño	Atlético GALE
2018	Walter Ormeño	Atlético GALE
2019	Walter Ormeño	Defensor Carmen Alto
2020	Canceled due to the COVID-19 pandemic	
2021	Canceled due to the COVID-19 pandemic	
2022	Walter Ormeño	Círculo Deportivo Sucre
2023	Walter Ormeño	Defensor Cantagallo
2024	Walter Ormeño	Matices Ciclo
2025	Defensor Carmen Alto	Walter Ormeño
2026	Walter Ormeño	Academia Real Cañete

=== Liga Distrital de Paramonga ===
==== List of champions ====
Season	Champion	Runner-up
2008	AIPSA	Sport Paramonga
2009	AIPSA	José Correa
2010	AIPSA	José Correa
2011	AIPSA	Independiente Cerro Blanco
2012	AIPSA	Sport Paramonga
2013	AIPSA	Sport Paramonga
2014	Independiente Cerro Blanco	Alianza Libertad
2015	AIPSA	Sport Paramonga
2016	AIPSA	Íntimos de Castilla
2017	Independiente Cerro Blanco	AIPSA
2018	AIPSA	Las Delicias
2019	AIPSA	Sport Paramonga
2020	Canceled due to the COVID-19 pandemic	
2021	Canceled due to the COVID-19 pandemic	
2022	Independiente Cerro Blanco	AIPSA
2023	AIPSA	Las Delicias
2024	AIPSA	Las Delicias
2025	Independiente Cerro Blanco	AIPSA
2026	AIPSA	Independiente Cerro Blanco

=== Liga Distrital de San Vicente ===
==== List of champions ====
Season	Champion	Runner-up
2009	Defensor Alayza	Independiente
2010	Atlético Chalaco	Nacional Valdivia
2011	Sport Estrella	Independiente
2012	Independiente	Atlético Chalaco
2013	Deportivo Cañete	Independiente
2014	Atlético Chalaco	Independiente
2015	Juventud Chilcal	Atlético Chalaco
2016	Juventud Chilcal	Independiente
2017	Independiente	Defensor 28 de Julio
2018	Antenor Rizo Patrón	Independiente
2019	Defensor La Encañada	Juventud Victoria
2020	Canceled due to the COVID-19 pandemic	
2021	Canceled due to the COVID-19 pandemic	
2022	No Tournament	
2023	Lolo Fernández	Antenor Rizo Patrón
2024	Estrella del Sur	Juventud Sport Victoria
2025	Independiente	Real Huarcos
2026	Sport Victoria	Defensor Santa Teresa

=== Liga Distrital de Supe Pueblo ===
==== List of champions ====
Season	Champion	Runner-up
2008	Unión Supe	Defensor San Nicolás
2009	Social San Nicolás	Defensor San Nicolás
2010	Unión Supe	Defensor San Nicolás
2011	Juventud Pacífico	Unión Caral
2012	Unión Vecinal	Nícida & Víctor
2013	Defensor San Nicolás	Nícida & Víctor
2014	Nícida & Víctor	Pampas de Velarde
2015	Defensor San Nicolás	Unión Supe
2016	Francisco Vidal	Sport Bolívar
2017	Unión Supe	Defensor San Nicolás
2018	Víctor Reyes	Social San Nicolás
2019	Unión Supe	Sport Bolívar
2020	Canceled due to the COVID-19 pandemic	
2021	Canceled due to the COVID-19 pandemic	
2022	Unión Supe	Defensor San Nicolás
2023	Unión Supe	Virgen del Rosario
2024	Unión Supe	Virgen del Rosario
2025	Unión Supe	Juventud Huracán
2026	Juventud La Mar	María Magdalena

== Loreto ==
=== Liga Distrital de Iquitos ===
==== List of champions ====
Season	Champion	Runner-up
2007	UNAP	Deportivo Celendín
2008	CNI	ADO
2009	Los Tigres	UNAP
2010	Los Tigres	Academia RC
2011	UNAP	Los Tigres
2012	CNI	UNAP
2013	Bolívar	CNI
2014	UPO	Urba Sargento Lores
2015	José Pardo	Bolívar
2016	Estudiantil CNI	José Pardo
2017	ID CNI	Estudiantil CNI
2018	ID CNI	UNAP
2019	Sport Loreto	Alianza Iquitos
2020	Canceled due to the COVID-19 pandemic	
2021	Canceled due to the COVID-19 pandemic	
2022	UNAP	Estudiantil CNI
2023	Estudiantil CNI	Alfonso Ugarte
2024	UNAP	Estudiantil CNI
2025	Deportivo Politécnico	Atlético Nacional
2026	Atlético Nacional	UNAP

== Madre de Dios ==
=== Liga Distrital de Tambopata ===
==== List of champions ====
Season	Champion
2010	Juventud La Joya
2011	Deportivo Maldonado
2012	Fray Martín de Porres
2013	30 de Agosto
2014	Deportivo Maldonado
2015	MINSA
2016	Deportivo Maldonado
2017	Deportivo Maldonado
2018	MINSA
2019	Hospital Santa Rosa
2020	Canceled due to the COVID-19 pandemic
2021	Canceled due to the COVID-19 pandemic
2022	Deportivo Maldonado
2023	Deportivo Maldonado
2024	Deportivo Maldonado
2025	Atlas PEM
2026	Fray Martín de Porres

== Moquegua ==
=== Liga Distrital de Ilo ===
==== List of champions ====
Season	Champion	Runner-up
2009	Mariscal Nieto	Deportivo Enersur
2010	Mariscal Nieto	Social Chalaca
2011	Deportivo Enersur	Social EPISA
2012	José Gálvez	Juventus Ilo
2013	Mariscal Nieto	Deportivo Enersur
2014	Mariscal Nieto	Deportivo Enersur
2015	Deportivo Enersur	Social Chalaca
2016	Mariscal Nieto	Deportivo Enersur
2017	Mariscal Nieto	Deportivo Enersur
2018	Mariscal Nieto	Deportivo Enersur
2019	ADEBA	Mariscal Nieto
2020	Canceled due to the COVID-19 pandemic	
2021	Canceled due to the COVID-19 pandemic	
2022	Mariscal Nieto	Social Chalaca
2023	Deportivo Enersur	Mariscal Nieto
2024	ADEBA	Hijos del Altiplano y del Pacífico
2025	ADEBA	Hijos del Altiplano y del Pacífico
2026	Deportivo Enersur	Mariscal Nieto

=== Liga Distrital de Moquegua ===
==== List of champions ====
Season	Champion	Runner-up
2009	Atlético Huracán	Francisco Fahlman
2010	Academia Ticsani	Atlético Huracán
2011	Atlético Huracán	San Simón
2012	San Simón	Mariano Melgar
2013	Estudiantes Alas Peruanas	San Simón
2014	Atlético Huracán	La Libertad
2015	Atlético Huracán	Francisco Fahlman
2016	Francisco Fahlman	Atlético Huracán
2017	Atlético Huracán	Academia Ticsani
2018	Academia Ticsani	Atlético Huracán
2019	Francisco Fahlman	Juventud Cobresol
2020	Canceled due to the COVID-19 pandemic	
2021	Canceled due to the COVID-19 pandemic	
2022	Academia Ticsani	UCV Moquegua
2023	UCV Moquegua	Atlético Huracán
2024	Academia Ticsani	Atlético Huracán
2025	UCV Moquegua	Santa María FC
2026	Liberty School College	Atlético Huracán

== Pasco ==
=== Liga Distrital de Chaupimarca ===
==== List of champions ====
Season	Champion	Runner-up
2009	Deportivo Valle	Sport Sausa
2010	UNDAC	J Pasco
2011	UNDAC	J Pasco
2012	UNDAC	Sport Sausa
2013	Sport Sausa	UNDAC
2014	UNDAC	Estudiantil Carrión
2015	Sporting Pasco	Sport Sausa
2016	J Pasco	Sporting Pasco
2017	Sport Sausa	Estudiantil Carrión
2018	Sport Sausa	Sporting Pasco
2019	Estudiantil Carrión	Unión Pasco
2020	Canceled due to the COVID-19 pandemic	
2021	Canceled due to the COVID-19 pandemic	
2022	Deportivo INEI 3	Estudiantil Carrión
2023	Sporting Pasco	Estudiantil Carrión
2024	Sport Sausa	UNDAC
2025	Elite Pasco	UNDAC
2026	UNDAC	Sporting Pasco

== Piura ==
=== Liga Distrital de Piura ===
==== List of champions ====
Season	Champion	Runner-up
2004	Alianza Vallejiana	UNP
2005	Alianza Vallejiana	Atlético Grau
2006	Corazón Micaelino	Alianza Vallejina
2007	Atlético Grau	Alianza Vallejina
2008	Atlético Grau	Alianza Vallejina
2009	Ignacio Merino	Sport Liberal
2010	Ignacio Merino	Alianza San Martín
2011	Alianza Vallejiana	Alianza San Martín
2012	UNP	Alianza San Martín
2013	UNP	Alianza Vallejina
2014	Sport Liberal	Escuela Piuranitos
2015	UNP	Academia San Antonio
2016	UNP	Sport Liberal
2017	Atlético Grau	UNP
2018	UNP	Ignacio Merino
2019	UNP	UDEP
2020	Canceled due to the COVID-19 pandemic	
2021	Canceled due to the COVID-19 pandemic	
2022	UNP	Sport Liberal
2023	UNP	Sport Liberal
2024	Academia Shekina	Pura Sangre Piurana
2025	Academia San Antonio	Academia Shekina
2026	Academia San Antonio	San Miguel

=== Liga Distrital de Pariñas ===
==== List of champions ====
Season	Champion	Runner-up
2007	Atlético Torino	Cosmos
2008	Atlético Torino	
2009	Cosmos	Deportivo Acapulco
2010	Cosmos	UDT Aviación
2011	Atlético Torino Nueva Generación	Defensor 9 de Octubre
2012	No tournament	
2013	No tournament	
2014	Sport Blondell	Delfines
2015	Delfines	Sport Talara
2016	Asociación Torino	Delfines
2017	Asociación Torino	UDT Aviación
2018	Asociación Torino	Atlético Torino
2019	Asociación Torino	Sport Blondell
2020	Canceled due to the COVID-19 pandemic	
2021	Canceled due to the COVID-19 pandemic	
2022	Atlético Torino	Asociación Torino
2023	Atlético Torino	Nelly Star
2024	Atlético Torino	Asociación Torino
2025	Atlético Torino	Once Amigos
2026	Atlético Torino	Asociación Torino

=== Liga Distrital de Sechura ===
==== List of champions ====
Season	Champion	Runner-up
2011	Defensor La Bocana	José Olaya
2012	Almirante Miguel Grau	Defensor La Bocana
2013	José Olaya	Defensor La Bocana
2014	Defensor La Bocana	UDP
2015	UDP	Minero Bayóvar
2016	UDP	Minero Bayóvar
2017	UDP	ARES
2018	UDP	ARES
2019	Defensor La Bocana	UDP
2020	Canceled due to the COVID-19 pandemic	
2021	Canceled due to the COVID-19 pandemic	
2022	Defensor La Bocana	Ciclón del Norte
2023	José Gálvez	UDP
2024	UD Marítimo	Almirante Miguel Grau
2025	Sport Juventud	UDP
2026	San Martín de Constante	Defensor La Bocana

=== Liga Distrital de Sullana ===
==== List of champions ====
Season	Champion	Runner-up
2009	Sport Atahualpa	Alianza Atlético
2010	Túpac Amaru	Defensor Nacional
2011	Túpac Amaru	Atlético Grau de Mallaritos
2012	Túpac Amaru	San Pedro Chanel
2013	Túpac Amaru	San Pedro Chanel
2014	San Pedro Chanel	Túpac Amaru
2015	Túpac Amaru	Juan Velasco Alvarado
2016	Juan Velasco Alvarado	Atlético Grau de Mallaritos
2017	Juan Velasco Alvarado	Atlético Grau de Mallaritos
2018	Túpac Amaru	Atlético Grau de Mallaritos
2019	Túpac Amaru	Defensor Nacional
2020	Canceled due to the COVID-19 pandemic	
2021	Canceled due to the COVID-19 pandemic	
2022	No tournament	
2023	San Pedro Chanel	Defensor Santa Teresita
2024	San Martín	Juan Velasco Alvarado
2025	San Martín	Beraka FC
2026	Atlético Grau de Mallaritos	San Martín

== Puno ==
=== Liga Distrital de Juliaca ===
==== List of champions ====
Season	Champion	Runner-up
2009	ADEVIL	SELIP
2010	SELIP	Defensor Politécnico
2011	SELIP	Junior de la UANCV
2012	Junior de la UANCV	ADEVIL
2013	Junior de la UANCV	ADEVIL
2014	Diablos Rojos	Junior de la UANCV
2015	ADEVIL	Diablos Rojos
2016	Credicoop San Román	Diablos Rojos
2017	ADEVIL	Diablos Rojos
2018	Credicoop San Román	Internacional Upa Upa
2019	Deportivo Enciniano	Internacional Upa Upa
2020	Canceled due to the COVID-19 pandemic	
2021	Canceled due to the COVID-19 pandemic	
2022	Deportivo Enciniano	Credicoop San Román
2023	Diablos Rojos	Credicoop San Román
2024	ANBA Perú	DAC Cerro Colorado
2025	Credicoop San Román	ANBA Perú
2026	CEFUT	Credicoop San Román

=== Liga Distrital de Puno ===
==== List of champions ====
Season	Champion	Runner-up
2009	Estudiantes Puno	Deportivo Educación
2010	Deportivo Universitario	Policial Santa Rosa
2011	Estudiantes Puno	Deportivo Universitario
2012	Policial Santa Rosa	Unión Carolina
2013	Deportivo Universitario	UANCV
2014	Deportivo Universitario	Policial Santa Rosa
2015	Policial Santa Rosa	Deportivo Universitario
2016	Central Galeno	Policial Santa Rosa
2017	Alfonso Ugarte	Estudiantes Puno
2018	Policial Santa Rosa	Deportivo Universitario
2019	Deportivo Universitario	Policial Santa Rosa
2020	Canceled due to the COVID-19 pandemic	
2021	Canceled due to the COVID-19 pandemic	
2022	Policial Santa Rosa	Deportivo Universitario
2023	Central Galeno	Carlos Varea
2024	Deportivo Universitario	Unión Carolina
2025	Deportivo Universitario	Policial Santa Rosa
2026	Policial Santa Rosa	Pesadilla del Altiplano

== San Martín ==
=== Liga Distrital de Moyobamba ===
==== List of champions ====
Season	Champion	Runner-up
2011	San Juan	Deportivo Hospital
2012	Deportivo Hospital	San Ignacio de Pedralbes
2013	Atlético Belén	Deportivo Hospital
2014	Deportivo Hospital	
2015	Deportivo Hospital	
2016	Deportivo Hospital	Constructora Trujillo
2017	Deportivo Hospital	AD Tahuishco
2018	Deportivo Pesquero	Unión Moyobamba
2019	AD Tahuishco	San Lorenzo de Huastilla
2020	Canceled due to the COVID-19 pandemic	
2021	Canceled due to the COVID-19 pandemic	
2022	AD Tahuishco	Estudiantes de Ingeniería
2023	San Lorenzo de Huastilla	AD Tahuishco
2024	Unión Moyobamba	Academia Sangre Azul
2025	Unión Moyobamba	AD Tahuishco
2026	Academia Alto Mayo	Estudiantes de Ingeniería

=== Liga Distrital de Tarapoto ===
==== List of champions ====
Season	Champion	Runner-up
2009	Unión Tarapoto	Deportivo Cali
2010	Unión Tarapoto	Unión César Vallejo
2011	Unión César Vallejo	Unión Tarapoto
2012	UNSM	Unión Tarapoto
2013	Deportivo Cali	Unión César Vallejo
2014	Unión César Vallejo	Deportivo Cali
2015	Unión Tarapoto	Unión César Vallejo
2016	Unión César Vallejo	Deportivo Cali
2017	Unión Tarapoto	UNSM
2018	Unión Tarapoto	UNSM
2019	Unión Tarapoto	Deportivo Cali
2020	Canceled due to the COVID-19 pandemic	
2021	Canceled due to the COVID-19 pandemic	
2022	Shuta Boys	Tarapoto City
2023	Unión Tarapoto	Tarapoto City
2024	Shuta Boys	Grandez
2025	Grandez	UNSM
2026	Unión Tarapoto	Real Palmera

== Tacna ==
=== Liga Distrital de Tacna ===
- The Liga Distrital de Tacna (Tacna District Football League) was founded on May 5, 1931.

==== List of champions ====
Season	Champion	Runner-up
2008	Mariscal Miller	Coronel Bolognesi
2009	Mariscal Miller	Defensor UNTAC
2010	Mariscal Miller	Defensor UNTAC
2011	Mariscal Miller	Coronel Bolognesi
2012	Coronel Bolognesi	Defensor UNTAC
2013	Coronel Bolognesi	Defensor UNTAC
2014	Coronel Bolognesi	Defensor UNTAC
2015	Mariscal Miller	Coronel Bolognesi
2016	Mariscal Miller	Deportivo Victoria
2017	Coronel Bolognesi	Mariscal Miller
2018	Orión	Mariscal Miller
2019	Coronel Bolognesi	Orión
2020	Canceled due to the COVID-19 pandemic	
2021	Canceled due to the COVID-19 pandemic	
2022	Coronel Bolognesi	Virgen de la Natividad
2023	Defensor Tacna	Deportivo Municipal
2024	Defensor UNTAC	Virgen de la Natividad
2025	Orcas AVT	Alfonso Ugarte
2026	Orcas AVT	Virgen de la Natividad

== Tumbes ==
=== Liga Distrital de Tumbes ===
==== List of champions ====
Season	Champion	Runner-up
2009	Defensor San José	Unión Pacífico
2010	UNT	Carlos Concha
2011	San Martín	Teófilo Cubillas
2012	San Martín	Unión Pacífico
2013	Atlético Tumbes	Defensor Las Mercedes
2014	Cristal Tumbes	Unión Pacífico
2015	Defensor Progreso	Eduardo Ávalos
2016	Eduardo Ávalos	Carlos Concha
2017	Defensor Progreso	Social El Tablazo
2018	Carlos Concha	Defensor Progreso
2019	Carlos Concha	Eduardo Ávalos
2020	Canceled due to the COVID-19 pandemic	
2021	Canceled due to the COVID-19 pandemic	
2022	Social El Tablazo	Renovación Pacífico
2023	Renovación Pacífico	Social El Tablazo
2024	Defensor Las Mercedes	Carlos Concha
2025	UNT	Pizarro Junior
2026	UNT	Social El Tablazo

=== Liga Distrital de Zarumilla ===
==== List of champions ====
Season	Champion	Runner-up
2009	Halcones del Norte	Comercial Aguas Verdes
2010	Halcones del Norte	Comercial Aguas Verdes
2011	José Chiroque Cielo	Sport Miraflores
2012	Sport Bolognesi	Comercial Aguas Verdes
2013	Sport Unión	Sport Bolognesi
2014	Deportivo Ferrocarril	Sport Unión
2015	Comercial Aguas Verdes	Sport Unión
2016	Comercial Aguas Verdes	Deportivo Ferrocarril
2017	Sport Unión	Sport Zarumilla
2018	Deportivo Ferrocarril	Sport Bolognesi
2019	Halcones del Norte	Deportivo Pacífico
2020	Canceled due to the COVID-19 pandemic	
2021	Canceled due to the COVID-19 pandemic	
2022	Deportivo Ferrocarril	Sport Bolognesi
2023	Deportivo Ferrocarril	Halcones del Norte
2024	Sport Unión	Sport Bolognesi
2025	Sport Zarumilla	Deportivo Ferrocarril
2026	Deportivo Ferrocarril	Deportivo Pacífico

== Ucayali ==
=== Liga Distrital de Callería ===
- The Liga Distrital de Callería - LIDIFUCA (Callería District Football League) was founded on April 10, 1975, and was officially registered with the IPDU Sports Registry on August 12, 1986.

==== List of champions ====
Season	Champion	Runner-up
2009	Deportivo Bancos	Deportivo Hospital
2010	São Paulo	Deportivo Hospital
2011	Deportivo Pucallpa	UNU
2012	Sport Loreto	Colegio Comercio
2013	Deportivo Bancos	Sport Loreto
2014	Santa Rosa	Defensor Pucallpa
2015	Deportivo Municipal	Colegio Comercio
2016	Pucallpa FC	UNU
2017	Deportivo Bancos	Pucallpa FC
2018	Colegio Comercio	UNU
2019	San Juan Bosco	Colegio Comercio
2020	Canceled due to the COVID-19 pandemic	
2021	Canceled due to the COVID-19 pandemic	
2022	Colegio Comercio	Deportivo Bancos
2023	UNU	Nuevo Pucallpa
2024	Rauker FC	Colegio Comercio
2025	Colegio Comercio	Deportivo Municipal
2026	La Peña de los Viernes	Deportivo Bancos
