= Cultural Casma =

- Full name: Centro Cultural Deportivo Casma
- Nickname(s): Culturalinos
- Founded: September 15, 1941; 83 years ago
- Ground: Estadio Valeriano López, Casma
- Capacity: 2,000
- League: Copa Perú
Home colours	Away colours

Club Cultural Deportivo Casma (sometimes referred as Cultural Casma) is a Peruvian football club, playing in the city of Casma, Áncash, Peru.

== History ==
The Cultural Casma was founded on September 15, 1941.

In the 2005 Copa Perú, the club qualified to the Departamental Stage, but was eliminated by José Gálvez in the semifinals.

In the 2011 Copa Perú, the club participated in the 2011 Liga Superior de Ancash, but was eliminated when it finished in 5th place.

== Honours ==
=== Regional ===
- Liga Departamental de Ancash:

Winners (2): 1984, 1988
Runner-up (2): 1967, 1986

- Liga Provincial de Casma:

Winners (7): 1980, 1984, 1988, 2004, 2006, 2008, 2009
Runner-up (2): 2005, 2007

- Liga Distrital de Casma:

Winners (15): 1967, 1975, 1980, 1981, 1984, 1987, 1988, 1991, 1992, 2004, 2005, 2006, 2007, 2008, 2010
Runner-up (1): 2009

== See also ==
- List of football clubs in Peru
- Peruvian football league system
