= Club Deportivo San Lorenzo de Almagro =

Peruvian football club

San Lorenzo
- Full name: Club Deportivo San Lorenzo de Almagro
- Nickname: Santos del Cercado
- Founded: 28 March 1928
- Ground: Elías Aguirre, Chiclayo
- Capacity: 25,000
- League: Copa Perú
Home colours	Away colours

Club Deportivo San Lorenzo de Almagro (sometimes referred as San Lorenzo) is a Peruvian football club, playing in the city of Chiclayo, Lambayeque, Peru.

== History ==
The Club Deportivo San Lorenzo de Almagro was founded on 28 March 1928. The club name is in honor of the Argentine sports club San Lorenzo de Almagro.

In the 1969 Copa Perú, the club qualified to the National Stage, but was eliminated when it finished in 3rd place.

In the 2014 Copa Perú, the club qualified to the Provincial Stage, but was eliminated by Unión Atahualpa.

== Rivalries ==
San Lorenzo de Almagro has had a long-standing rivalry with local club Boca Juniors de Chiclayo.

== Honours ==
=== Regional ===
- Liga Departamental de Lambayeque:

Winners (3): 1967, 1968, 1992

- Liga Distrital de Chiclayo:

Winners (7): 1960, 1967, 1968, 1987, 1991, 1992, 2014
Runner-up (1): 1977

== See also ==
- List of football clubs in Peru
- Peruvian football league system
