= Larry Yáñez =

Peruvian footballer (born 1981)

Personal information
- Full name: Larry Keith Yáñez Zúñiga
- Date of birth: 28 April 1981 (age 45)
- Place of birth: Aplao, Arequipa, Peru
- Height: 1.73 m (5 ft 8 in)
- Positions: Full back; midfielder

Team information
- Current team: Melgar
- Number: 7

Senior career*
| Years | Team | Apps | (Gls) |
| 2002–2004 | Atlético Universidad | | |
| 2004 | Melgar | | |
| 2005 | Atlético Universidad | | |
| 2006 | Sport Ancash | | |
| 2007 | Total Clean | 24 | (1) |
| 2008 | Sporting Cristal | 1 | (0) |
| 2008–2010 | Melgar | 110 | (4) |
| 2011 | Cobresol | 15 | (0) |
| 2012– | Melgar | 34 | (2) |
- * Club domestic league appearances and goals as of 11 November 2012

Larry Keith Yáñez Zúñiga (born 28 April 1981) is a Peruvian footballer who plays as a full back or midfielder for FBC Melgar in the Torneo Descentralizado.

== Club career ==
Larry Yáñez began his career with local side Atlético Universidad in 2002. There he featured alongside players like Christian Zúñiga, Jorge Alegría, Héctor Rojas, and won the 2002 Copa Perú title. The following seasons he played in the top-flight, the Torneo Descentralizado with the newly promoted Atlético Universidad.

Then in July 2004 Yáñez joined Arequipa giants FBC Melgar. However, his time there was short and stayed until the end of the 2004 season.

The following season, he returned to Atlético Universidad and then in 2006 had a spell with Sport Ancash.
