= 2004 Club Atlético Universidad season =

Club Atlético Universidad
2004 season
- Stadium: Estadio Monumental Virgen de Chapi
- Torneo Descentralizado: Torneo Apertura: Thirteenth (13°); Torneo Clausura: Nineth (9°); Aggregate Table: Eleventh (11°); Eleventh National (11°)

The 2004 Atlético Universidad season were the Forty-First (41.º) of the club from its foundation in 1964, Two (2) participations in the top-flight of Peruvian Primera División (of 88 Editions) with denomination Torneo Descentralizado. In Previous Season the club qualified as 10th Place of the 2003 Torneo Descentralizado.

Atlético Universidad were a of fourteen (14) clubs in the Thirty-Nineth edition (39.º) Torneo Descentralizado, the competition most important of the Peruvian football. The club played the Peruvian Primera División.

== Torneo Descentralizado ==
=== Torneo Apertura ===
Pos	Team	Pld	W	D	L	GF	GA	GD	Pts
12	Sport Boys	26	6	7	13	28	40	-12	25
13	Atletico Universidad	26	5	9	12	28	42	-14	24
14	Universidad San Martín	26	2	4	20	21	50	-29	10

== See also ==
- Atlético Universidad
- 2004 Torneo Descentralizado
