= 2005 Club Atlético Universidad season =

Club Atlético Universidad
2005 season
- Stadium: Estadio Monumental Virgen de Chapi
- Torneo Descentralizado: Torneo Apertura: Tenth (10°); Torneo Clausura: Eighth (8°); Aggregate Table: Tenth (10°); Tenth National (10°)

The 2005 Atlético Universidad season were the Forty-Second (42.º) of the club from its foundation in 1964, Three (3) participations in the top-flight of Peruvian Primera División (of 89 Editions) with denomination Torneo Descentralizado. In Previous Season the club qualified as 11th Place of the 2004 Torneo Descentralizado.

Atlético Universidad were a of thirteen (13) clubs in the Fortieth edition (40.º) Torneo Descentralizado, the competition most important of the Peruvian football. The club played the Peruvian Primera División.

== Torneo Descentralizado ==
=== Torneo Apertura ===
| Pos | Team | Pld | W | D | L | GF | GA | GD | Pts |
|---|---|---|---|---|---|---|---|---|---|
| 9 | FBC Melgar | 24 | 7 | 6 | 11 | 32 | 42 | -10 | 27 |
| 10 | Atletico Universidad | 24 | 5 | 8 | 11 | 26 | 40 | -14 | 23 |
| 11 | Universidad César Vallejo | 24 | 4 | 10 | 10 | 27 | 36 | -9 | 22 |

== See also ==
- Atlético Universidad
- 2005 Torneo Descentralizado
