= Sport Dos de Mayo =

Peruvian football club

- Full name: Sport Dos de Mayo
- Nickname: El Rodillo del Centro
- Founded: 23 February 1919
- Ground: Estadio Unión Tarma, Tarma
- Capacity: 9,000
- Chairman: Pedro Pérez Caparachin
- League: Copa Perú
Home colours	Away colours

Sport Dos de Mayo is a Peruvian football club playing in the city of Tarma.

The club was founded on 23 February 1919 and plays in the Copa Perú, which is the fourth division of the Peruvian league system.

== History ==
In the 2002 Copa Perú, the club qualified to the Regional Stage, but was eliminated by León de Huánuco.

In the 2010 Copa Perú, the club qualified to the Regional Stage, but was eliminated by Bella Durmiente.

== Rivalries ==
Sport Dos de Mayo has had a long-standing rivalry with Asociación Deportiva Tarma.

== Honours ==
=== Regional ===
- Región V:

Winners (1): 2002

- Liga Departamental de Junín:

Winners (2): 2002, 2010

- Liga Provincial de Tarma:

Winners (5): 2002, 2008, 2010, 2016, 2018, 2023
Runner-up (4): 2007, 2013, 2015, 2024

- Liga Distrital de Tarma:

Winners (14): 1951, 1954, 1955, 1956, 1957, 1958, 1959, 1963, 2002, 2010, 2022, 2023, 2024, 2025
Runner-up (4): 2013, 2015, 2016, 2018

== See also ==
- List of football clubs in Peru
- Peruvian football league system
