= Ligas Provinciales del Peru =

- Country: Peru
- Number of clubs: Variable
- Level on pyramid: 6
- Promotion to: Ligas Departamentales
- Relegation to: Ligas Distritales

The Ligas Provinciales del Peru are the Peruvian football lower divisions. They are administered by the Local Federations. The level immediately above is the Ligas Departamentales (Copa Perú).

The Provincial Leagues of Peru are a stage of the Copa Perú, following the District Leagues, which each year produce a district champion and runner-up that qualify to compete in this competition organized by the respective federations in each province. The provincial champions and runners-up advance to the Departmental Stage, where teams from the different provinces of the same department compete. The departmental champions and runners-up then progress to the National Stage, where they face teams from across the country. The champion is promoted to the Ligas 2, while the runner-up is promoted to the Ligas 2 or Ligas 3.

The following is a list of notable provincial football leagues in Peru sorted by region.

== Format ==
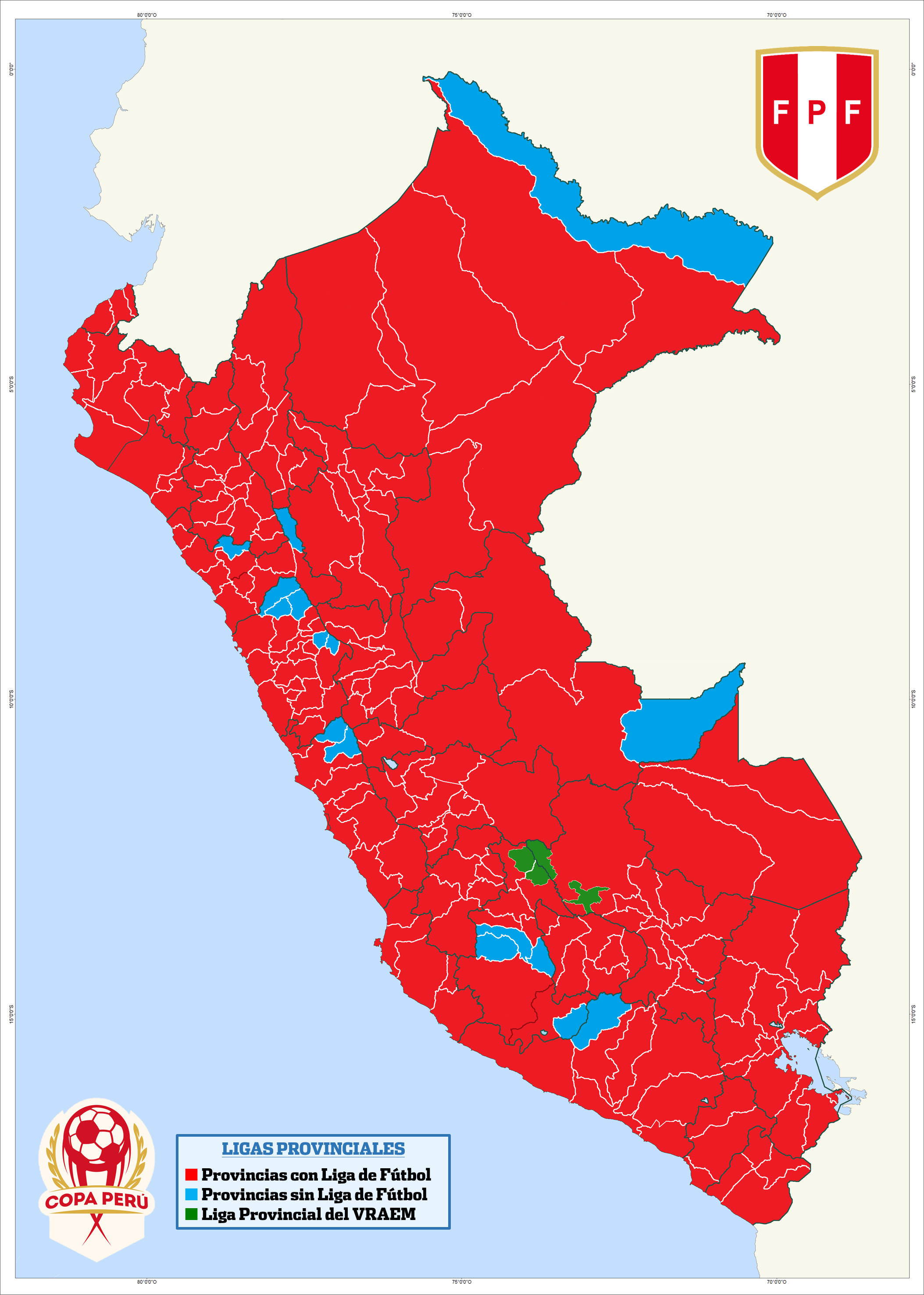
Provinces with a provincial league in the tournament.

The tournament has 5 stages. The first stage of the tournament is the District Stage (Spanish: Etapa Distrital), played from February to May. Districts hold a small league tournament to determine its winners which will qualify for the next stage. The second stage is the Provincial Stage (Spanish: Etapa Provincial), played in June and July. The District winners play in groups and the winners qualify for the next stage. The third stage is the Departmental Stage (Spanish: Etapa Departamental), consisting of another league tournament, between July and September.

=== Stages ===
Level	Stage
4	Etapa Nacional (Copa Peru)
5	Ligas Departamentales
6	Ligas Provinciales
7	Ligas Distritales Primera División
8	Ligas Distritales Segunda División

== Amazonas ==
=== Liga Provincial de Chachapoyas ===
==== List of champions ====
Season	Champion	Runner-up
2009	Deportivo Hospital	Unión Santo Domingo
2010	Higos Urco	Unión Santo Domingo
2011	Juventud Dinámica Tushpuna	Unión Santo Domingo
2012	Sachapuyos	Higos Urco
2013	Deportivo Hospital	Higos Urco
2014	Unión Santo Domingo	Higos Urco
2015	UPP	Deportivo Hospital
2016	Higos Urco	Unión Santo Domingo
2017	Unión Santo Domingo	Sachapuyos
2018	Sachapuyos	Alipio Ponce
2019	UNTRM	Sachapuyos
2020	Canceled due to the COVID-19 pandemic	
2021	Canceled due to the COVID-19 pandemic	
2022	Sachapuyos	Unión Santo Domingo
2023	Deportivo Municipal	Unión Santo Domingo
2024	Amazonas FC	Unión Santo Domingo
2025	Amazonas FC	Sachapuyos
2026	Sachapuyos	Juan Pablo II

=== Liga Provincial de Utcubamba ===
==== List of champions ====
Season	Champion	Runner-up
2009	San Francisco de Asís	Escuela Municipal
2010	Escuela Municipal	San Francisco de Asís
2011	San Francisco de Asís	JVD Tolasha
2012	Defensor Santa Isabel	Santa Rosa de Gonchillo
2013	Bagua Grande	Defensor Santa Isabel
2014	Bagua Grande	Defensor Santa Isabel
2015	Bagua Grande	Miguel Grau (Tactago)
2016	Sporting Victoria	Miguel Grau (Tactago)
2017	Bagua Grande	Sporting Victoria
2018	Bagua Grande	Santa Rosa de Gonchillo
2019	Independiente Hualango	Sporting Victoria
2020	Canceled due to the COVID-19 pandemic	
2021	Canceled due to the COVID-19 pandemic	
2022	Unión Vencedores	Bagua Grande
2023	Bagua Grande	Unión Cumba
2024	Cajaruro FC	Unión Juventud
2025	Bagua Grande	Nueva Generación
2026	Barza Sport	San Francisco de Asís

== Áncash ==
=== Liga Provincial de Aija ===
==== List of champions ====
Season	Champion	Runner-up
2010	Sport Juvenil Sipza	Defensor San Damián
2011	Defensor Tumán	Los Alacránes de Kotup
2012	Sport Buenos Aires	Sport Juvenil Sipza
2013	Sport Buenos Aires	Defensor Tumán
2014	Juvenil San Ildefonso	Sport Juvenil Sipza
2015	La Trinidad	Unión Succhapampa
2016	La Trinidad	Juventud Huellap
2017	La Trinidad	Defensor Player
2018	La Trinidad	Sport Buenos Aires
2019	Sport Juvenil Sipza	Juvenil San Ildefonso
2020	Canceled due to the COVID-19 pandemic	
2021	Canceled due to the COVID-19 pandemic	
2022	Sport Juvenil Sipza	Defensor Ullucuran
2023	Sport Buenos Aires	Imán Palmira
2024	Líder Andino	Señor de los Milagros
2025	Juvenil San Ildefonso	Señor de los Milagros
2026	Alakranes Kotup	Imán Palmira

=== Liga Provincial de Bolognesi ===
==== List of champions ====
Season	Champion	Runner-up
2010	Representativo Huallanca	
2011	El Chasqui	
2012	Santa Rosa de Aquia	
2013	El Chasqui	Las Casuarinas
2014	Reacción Aquia	El Chasqui
2015	Representativo Huallanca	América
2016	Los Jardines	Reacción Aquia
2017	Alianza Lima (Huallanca)	El Chasqui
2018	Nevado Chiuruco	El Chasqui
2019	El Chasqui	Deportivo Pachapaqui
2020	Canceled due to the COVID-19 pandemic	
2021	Canceled due to the COVID-19 pandemic	
2022	Huracán (Toma)	Juventud Santa Rosa
2023	Guillermo Bracale Ramos	ACD Llampa
2024	FC Yacupampa	Deportivo Municipal (Huallanca)
2025	Juventud Tupac Amaru	FC Yacupampa
2026	Coronel Bolognesi	El Chasqui

=== Liga Provincial de Carhuaz ===
==== List of champions ====
Season	Champion	Runner-up
2011	Defensor River Santa	Huracán (Toma)
2012	Los Ángeles de San Miguel de Aco	Huracán (Toma)
2013	Alianza Corazón	Defensor River Santa
2014	Defensor River Santa	Social Anta
2015	Defensor River Santa	Once Hermanos de Punyan
2016	Transportes Pablito	Defensor River Santa
2017	Defensor River Santa	Alianza Vicos
2018	Estrella Roja de Shumay	Social Anta
2019	Transportes Pablito	Universitario de Urán
2020	Canceled due to the COVID-19 pandemic	
2021	Canceled due to the COVID-19 pandemic	
2022	Estrella Roja de Shumay	Líderes de Fundo Aco
2023	Deportivo Obraje	Transportes Pablito
2024	Estrella Roja de Shumay	Transportes Pablito
2025	Deportivo Obraje	Alianza Vicos
2026	Defensor Pariahuanca	Transportes Pablito

=== Liga Provincial de Casma ===
==== List of champions ====
Season	Champion	Runner-up
1996	Magdalena	
1997	San Martín	
1998	Juventud Indoamérica	
1999	San Martín	
2000	San Luis de Sechin	
2001	Juventud Indoamérica	
2002	Juventud Indoamérica	
2003	Juventud Indoamérica	
2004	Cultural Casma	
2005	Unión Buenavista	
2006	Cultural Casma	
2007	Barrionuevo	
2008	Cultural Casma	
2009	Cultural Casma	San Martín
2010	San Martín	Alianza Huancamuña
2011	Defensor Porteño	DELUSA
2012	DELUSA	Unión Juventud Quillo
2013	DELUSA	Universitario de Buenavista
2014	Alianza Huancamuña	Juventud Indoamérica
2015	DELUSA	Sport Quillo
2016	Sport Inca	DELUSA
2017	DELUSA	Centro Unión Carrizal
2018	Centro Unión Carrizal	Deportivo Cenepa
2019	Sport Áncash (Yaután)	Alianza Cachipampa
2020	Canceled due to the COVID-19 pandemic	
2021	Canceled due to the COVID-19 pandemic	
2022	Sport Huaquilla Baja	Centro Social Pariacoto
2023	Centro Social Pariacoto	Santo Domingo
2024	Sport Huaquilla Baja	Centro Social Pariacoto
2025	Olivar FC	ADECO
2026	Olivar FC	ADECO

=== Liga Provincial de Huaraz ===
==== List of champions ====
Season	Champion	Runner-up
2009	Huaraz FC	
2010	UNASAM	Defensor Nicrupampa
2011	Caballeros de La Ley	Huaraz FC
2012	Sport Rosario	Huaraz FC
2013	Real Shancayán	Sport Rosario
2014	Sport Rosario	Real Shancayán
2015	Sport Áncash	Furia Ancashina
2016	Sport Rosario	Cristal Aco
2017	Juventud Huaraz	Unión Áncash
2018	Sport Áncash	Caballeros de La Ley
2019	Sport Áncash	Caballeros de La Ley
2020	Canceled due to the COVID-19 pandemic	
2021	Canceled due to the COVID-19 pandemic	
2022	Sport Áncash	Rosario
2023	Star Áncash	Caballeros de La Ley
2024	Sport Áncash	Caballeros de La Ley
2025	Huaraz FC	Academia Sarita Colonia
2026	Barcelona de Pashpa	Huaraz FC

=== Liga Provincial de Huari ===
==== List of champions ====
Season	Champion	Runner-up
2011	Rázuri de Carhuayoc	Juventud San Marcos
2012	Juventud Líderes	Real Conchucos
2013	Sport Jana Barrio	Juventud Líderes
2014	Unión Círculo Ura Barrio	Señor de los Milagros
2015	Deportivo Concas	Unión Círculo Ura Barrio
2016	Unión Círculo Ura Barrio	Bello Horizonte
2017	San Pedro de Carash	Unión Carhuayoc
2018	Juventud Líderes	Sport Conchucos
2019	San Miguel de Arcángel de Quercos	Atlético Minero (San Marcos)
2020	Canceled due to the COVID-19 pandemic	
2021	Canceled due to the COVID-19 pandemic	
2022	San Andrés de Runtu	Unión Círculo Ura Barrio
2023	Atlético Huari	San Marcos
2024	San Andrés de Runtu	Sport Ayash Huamanin
2025	Real Independiente	San Pedro de Cajay
2026	San Andrés de Runtu	Atlético Minero

=== Liga Provincial de Huarmey ===
==== List of champions ====
Season	Champion	Runner-up
2009	La Victoria	Juventud Culebreña
2011	Cultural Santo Domingo	Tayca Chilcal
2012	Cultural Santo Domingo	Juventud Culebreña
2013	Sport Miramar	Huracán del Norte
2014	Panamericana Miramar	Cultural Santo Domingo
2016	Once Amigos	Juventud Barbacay
2015	Panamericana Miramar	Tayca Chilcal
2017	Once Amigos	Panamericana Miramar
2018	Cultural Santo Domingo	Industrial La Laguna de Culebras
2019	Huracán del Norte	San Isidro de Congon
2020	Canceled due to the COVID-19 pandemic	
2021	Canceled due to the COVID-19 pandemic	
2022	Huracán del Norte	Once Amigos
2023	Atlético Bruces	Juventud 9 de Octubre
2024	Geronimus's College	Defensor Huarmey
2025	Unión Garlero	Sport Miramar
2026	Real Juventud Santa Rosa	Alfonso Ugarte (Culebras)

=== Liga Provincial de Huaylas ===
==== List of champions ====
Season	Champion	Runner-up
2011	Unión Santa Fe	Las Palmeras
2012	Santa Rosa de Huallanca	Alianza Santa Cruz
2013	Las Palmeras	San Juan de Pichiu
2014	Alianza Santa Rosa	San Miguel de Huamancayán
2015	River Santa	Defensor Conay
2016	Las Palmeras	Real Sociedad
2017	Miraflores	Unión Huancarhuaz
2018	Las Palmeras	Sport Chavín
2019	Villa Sucre	Juvenil Power
2020	Canceled due to the COVID-19 pandemic	
2021	Canceled due to the COVID-19 pandemic	
2022	Alianza Santa Cruz	Los Gremios de Huanchac
2023	Juvenil Power	Atlético Villa Sucre
2024	River Santa	Nueva Generación
2025	River Santa	Sport Rosario de Paty
2026	River Santa	Unión Santa Fe

=== Liga Provincial de Recuay ===
==== List of champions ====
Season	Champion	Runner-up
2011	Cultural El Obrero	Urb. Santa Gertrudis
2012	Santo Domingo de Compinas	Santa Rosa de Cátac
2013	Dos de Mayo	Cultural El Obrero
2014	Dos de Mayo	Deportivo Bolívar
2015	Dos de Mayo	Cultural El Obrero
2016	Escuela de Minas	Cultural El Obrero
2017	Deportivo Bolognesi	Santa Rosa de Cátac
2018	Sport Juventud Cátac	Sport Juventud La Libertad
2019	Santa Rosa	Escuela de Minas
2020	Canceled due to the COVID-19 pandemic	
2021	Canceled due to the COVID-19 pandemic	
2022	Atlético Dandys	San Antonio de Padua
2023	Sport Juventud La Libertad	Atlético Dandys
2024	Deportivo Bolívar	Urb. Santa Gertrudis
2025	Independiente Parco	Cultural Primavera
2026	San Idelfonso	Deportivo Bolívar

=== Liga Provincial de Santa ===
==== List of champions ====
Season	Champion	Runner-up
2009	Academia Francisco Ríos	Juventud Tambo Real
2010	Juventud La Unión	Academia Francisco Ríos
2011	Independiente 3 de Octubre	América de Samanco
2012	Unión Juventud	Independiente 3 de Octubre
2013	Alfonso Ugarte (Jimbe)	Universidad San Pedro
2014	Universidad San Pedro	Independiente 3 de Octubre
2015	Juventud Tambo Real	Alfonso Ugarte (Cáceres del Perú)
2016	Sport San Cristóbal	Estrella Roja de Santa
2017	José Gálvez	Alfonso Ugarte (Samanco)
2018	Academia Sipesa	Los Turrys
2019	Alejandro Villanueva	José Gálvez
2020	Canceled due to the COVID-19 pandemic	
2021	Canceled due to the COVID-19 pandemic	
2022	Unión Juventud	Atlético Bruces
2023	Alianza San Luis	Atlético Municipal Mariátegui
2024	Alianza Arenal	José Gálvez Chimbote
2025	Juventud La Unión	Real Puerto Chimbote
2026	Alianza Arenal	Escuela Ramón Castilla

=== Liga Provincial de Sihuas ===
==== List of champions ====
Season	Champion	Runner-up
2011	Los Amigos	Deportivo Lucerito
2012	Deportivo Lucerito	Deportivo Primavera
2013	Deportivo Primavera	Deportivo Lucerito
2014	Nueva Juventud	Virgen del Rosario
2015	Sport Huayllabamba	AERES
2016	Héroes de Chinchobamba	Virgen del Rosario
2017	Virgen del Rosario	Estrella Roja de Manta
2018	Deportivo Primavera	Deportivo Lucerito
2019	Deportivo Raymondi	Deportivo Lucerito
2020	Canceled due to the COVID-19 pandemic	
2021	Canceled due to the COVID-19 pandemic	
2022	Deportivo Primavera	Juventud Chingalpo
2023	Deportivo Primavera	Estrella Roja de Manta
2024	Virgen del Rosario	José Olaya (San Luis)
2025	Deportivo Raymondi	Deportivo Primavera
2026		

=== Liga Provincial de Yungay ===
==== List of champions ====
Season	Champion	Runner-up
2011	San Cristóbal (Shupluy)	Juventud América (Ranrahirca)
2012	Juventud América (Ranrahirca)	San Cristóbal (Shupluy)
2013	Cultural La Perla Negra	San Cristóbal (Shupluy)
2014	Cultural La Perla Negra	HDC Mancos
2015	Los Halcones de Tumpa	Rosario Central
2016	Juventud América (Ranrahirca)	Defensor Huascarán
2017	Los Halcones de Tumpa	HDC Mancos
2018	Defensor Pariantana	San Juan Bautista
2019	Señor de Mayo	HDC Mancos
2020	Canceled due to the COVID-19 pandemic	
2021	Canceled due to the COVID-19 pandemic	
2022	San Juan Bautista	Cultural La Perla Negra
2023	Unión Deportivo Huracán	Nueva Juventud (Arhuay)
2024	Cultural La Perla Negra	Colegio San Roque
2025	Corazón de Arhuay	Juventus de Independencia
2026	San Cristóbal (Shupluy)	Atlético Huascarán

== Apurímac ==
=== Liga Provincial de Abancay ===
==== List of champions ====
Season	Champion	Runner-up
2007	Miguel Grau	Deportivo Educación
2008	Deportivo Educación	
2009	Pueblo Libre	Deportivo Educación
2010	Miguel Grau	Universitario UTEA
2011	Miguel Grau	Deportivo Educación
2012	Apurímac	Deportivo CLAS Tamburco
2013	Ingeniería Civil	Universitario UTEA
2014	Miguel Grau	La Victoria
2015	Deportivo Educación	Miguel Grau
2016	Miguel Grau	La Victoria
2017	Universitario UTEA	Miguel Grau
2018	Retamoso	Patrona Santa Catalina
2019	Miguel Grau	Deportivo Educación
2020	Canceled due to the COVID-19 pandemic	
2021	Canceled due to the COVID-19 pandemic	
2022	Social El Olivo	La Victoria
2023	Social El Olivo	Miguel Grau
2024	Cultural Huancarama	Miguel Grau
2025	Peña Sport	Cultural Huancarama
2026	Real Apurímac	Miguel Grau

=== Liga Provincial de Antabamba ===
==== List of champions ====
Season	Champion	Runner-up
2009	Deportivo Municipal (Antabamba)	Juventus de Silco
2010	Deportivo Municipal (Antabamba)	Juventud Mollebamba
2011	Deportivo Municipal (Antabamba)	Juventud Mollebamba
2012	Deportivo Municipal (Antabamba)	
2013	Deportivo Municipal (Antabamba)	
2014	Deportivo Municipal (Antabamba)	Colegio José Carlos Mariátegui
2015	Deportivo Municipal (Antabamba)	
2016	Deportivo Calvario	Tecnológico
2017	Social Barrio Alto	Colegio José Carlos Mariátegui
2018	Barrio Soncco	Social Barrio Alto
2019	Alianza Antabamba	Deportivo Molloco
2020	Canceled due to the COVID-19 pandemic	
2021	Canceled due to the COVID-19 pandemic	
2022	Social Barrio Alto	Halcones de El Oro
2023	Halcones de El Oro	Deportivo Municipal (Antabamba)
2024	Halcones de El Oro	Estrella de Totora
2025	Familia Zanabria	Defensor Qollana
2026	Atlético Sabaino	Halcones de El Oro

=== Liga Provincial de Andahuaylas ===
==== List of champions ====
Season	Champion	Runner-up
2009	José María Arguedas	Alianza Talavera
2010	Cultural Santa Rosa	Huracán de Hualalachi
2011	Real Santa María	Real América
2012	Siempre Chankas	DECH
2013	José María Arguedas	Cultural Santa Rosa
2014	DECH	Cultural Santa Rosa
2015	Cultural Santa Rosa	Sport Municipal
2016	José María Arguedas	DECH
2017	Andahuaylas FC	José María Arguedas
2018	Andahuaylas FC	DECH
2019	UAP	Andahuaylas FC
2020	Canceled due to the COVID-19 pandemic	
2021	Canceled due to the COVID-19 pandemic	
2022	Andahuaylas FC	Argama FC
2023	Argama FC	Andahuaylas FC
2024	Instituto Apurímac	Defensor José María Arguedas
2025	Instituto Apurímac	Cultural Poltoccsa
2026	Instituto Apurímac	Hungaritos de Cupisa

=== Liga Provincial de Aymaraes ===
==== List of champions ====
Season	Champion	Runner-up
2009	Deportivo Municipal (Tintay)	Mañanja de Cotarusi
2010	Grupo Torvisco de Chacña	Virgen del Carmen
2011	Unión Soraya	Unión Iscahuaca
2012	Nuevo Progreso	Los Andes Pachahui
2013	Defensor Huayunca	
2014	Deportivo Huampoccota	Unión Chapimarca
2015	Quinto Distrito	
2016	Patrón Santiago	Sport Acoycha
2017	Patrón Santiago	Unión Panamericana
2018	Deportivo Municipal (Cotaruse)	Deportivo Auquiato
2019	Patrón Santiago	Unión Chapimarca
2020	Canceled due to the COVID-19 pandemic	
2021	Canceled due to the COVID-19 pandemic	
2022	Señor de Huarquiza	Deportivo Auquiato
2023	Patrón Santiago	Cultural de Luychupata
2024	Social Huasapampa	Defensor Huayunca
2025	Unión Pocohuanca	Unión Pocohuanca
2026	Apu Wipany	Unión Pocohuanca

=== Liga Provincial de Cotabambas ===
==== List of champions ====
Season	Champion	Runner-up
2009	Mina Las Bambas	Deportivo Municipal (Tambobamba)
2010	Mina Las Bambas	Huancayllo
2011	Mina Las Bambas	Social Challhuahuacho
2012	Alianza Coyllor	Social Challhuahuacho
2013	Cultural Los Charkas	
2014	Mina Las Bambas	Cultural Los Charkas
2015	Defensor Charkas	
2016	Mina las Bambas	Atlético Fuerabamba
2017	Mina Las Bambas	Unión Pumamarca
2018	Atigrados de Huanca	Villa La Merced
2019	Atlético Fuerabamba	Social Challhuahuacho
2020	Canceled due to the COVID-19 pandemic	
2021	Canceled due to the COVID-19 pandemic	
2022	Virgen del Carmen (Ccochapata)	Social Haquira
2023	FC Municipal Challhuahuacho	FC Municipal Cotabambas
2024	Unión Minas de Pamputa	FC Huancuire
2025	Puya Raimondi	Unión Minas de Pamputa
2026	Unión Minas de Pamputa	Puya Raimondi

=== Liga Provincial de Chincheros (Cusco Province) ===
==== List of champions ====
Season	Champion	Runner-up
2009	Deportivo Municipal (Uripa)	Social Huaccana
2010	Deportivo Municipal (Uripa)	Cooperativa VINCOSUR
2011	Deportivo Municipal (Challhuani)	Gerencia Sub Regional
2012	Tecnológico	
2013	Tecnológico	
2014	Cooperativa VINCOSUR	Deportivo Padre Rumi
2015	Deportivo Municipal (Challhuani)	
2016	Virgen del Carmen (Ocobamba)	Deportivo Municipal (Challhuani)
2017	Santiago Apóstol	Defensor Uripa
2018	Deportivo Municipal (Challhuani)	Social La Florida
2019	Ocobamba FC	Santiago Apóstol
2020	Canceled due to the COVID-19 pandemic	
2021	Canceled due to the COVID-19 pandemic	
2022	Social La Florida	Hijos de Piscobamba
2023	Deportivo Municipal (Miraflores)	Defensor Uripa
2024	Social La Florida	Deportivo Ocobamba
2025	Hijos de Piscobamba	Juventud San Lorenzo
2026	San Cristóbal de Ancahuayllo	San Cristóbal de Mayhupata

=== Liga Provincial de Grau ===
==== List of champions ====
Season	Champion	Runner-up
2009	Deportivo Municipal (Chuquibambilla)	Dos de Junio (Vilcabamba)
2010	Deportivo Municipal (Chuquibambilla)	Deportivo Municipal (Pataypampa)
2011	Deportivo Municipal (Chuquibambilla)	Micaela Bastidas Ayrihuanca
2012	Deportivo Municipal (Curpahuasi)	IST Vilcabamba
2013	Huanacopampa	
2014	Barrio Bajo Vilcabamba	Deportivo Aviación - Progreso
2015	Deportivo Municipal (Chuquibambilla)	
2016	Deportivo Aviación	Tecnológico Vilcabamba
2017	San Nicolás de Tolentino	Señor de Huanca
2018	Malmanya de Hahuanhuire	Dakar Internacional
2019	Dakar Internacional	Deportivo Municipal (Chuquibambilla)
2020	Canceled due to the COVID-19 pandemic	
2021	Canceled due to the COVID-19 pandemic	
2022	Récord Sulfubamba	Deportivo Municipal (Chuquibambilla)
2023	Deportivo Municipal (Grau)	Deportivo Sulfubamba
2024	Cultural El Grauino	San Nicolás Tolentino
2025	Deportivo Municipal (Grau)	Deportivo Yawar Mayu
2026	Sport Ayerve	Real Juventud

== Arequipa ==
=== Liga Provincial de Arequipa ===
==== List of champions ====
Season	Champion	Runner-up
1967	Sportivo Huracán	
1968	Melgar	
1969	Melgar	
1970	Melgar	
1971	Deportivo CARSA	
1972	Sportivo Huracán	
1973	Piérola	
1974	Sportivo Huracán	
1975	Atlético Universidad	
1976	Sportivo Huracán	
1977	Sportivo Huracán	
1978	Sportivo Huracán	
1979	Sportivo Huracán	
1980	Sportivo Huracán	
1981	Sportivo Huracán	
1982	Piérola	
1983	Sportivo Huracán	
1984	Sporting Tabaco (Socabaya)	
1985	Alianza Socabaya	
1986	Ciclón Guardia Civil	
1987	Aurora	
1988	Ciclón Guardia Civil	
1989	Alianza Socabaya	
1990	Sportivo Huracán	
1991	Sport Alianza (Mariano Melgar)	
1992	Piérola	
1993	Estrella de Misti	
1994	Yanahuara	
1995	Sportivo Huracán	
1996	Piérola	
1997	Mariscal Castilla (Cerro Colorado)	
1998	Senati	
1999	Sportivo Huracán	
2000	Atlético Universidad	
2001	Atlético Universidad	
2002	Atlético Universidad	
2003	Sportivo Huracán	
2004	Senati	
2005	Senati	
2006	Total Clean	
2007	Aurora	
2008	Transportes del Carpio	IDUNSA
2009	Saetas de Oro	Unión Salaverry
2010	Max Uhle	Transportes del Carpio
2011	Saetas de Oro	White Star
2012	Defensor El Carmen	Internacional
2013	Saetas de Oro	Internacional
2014	Juventus Melgar	Internacional
2015	Sportivo Huracán	Saetas de Oro
2016	Binacional	Deportivo Sutega
2017	Cerrito Los Libres	Sportivo Huracán
2018	Sportivo Huracán	Independiente Cayma
2019	Atlético Universidad	White Star
2020	Canceled due to the COVID-19 pandemic	
2021	Canceled due to the COVID-19 pandemic	
2022	Sporting Cristal (Uchumayo)	Los Tigres de Cayma
2023	Sportivo Huracán	Aurora
2024	Aurora	Atlético Universidad
2025	Amigos de la PNP	Tiznados
2026	Amigos de la PNP	Academia CIMAC

=== Liga Provincial de Camaná ===
==== List of champions ====
Season	Champion	Runner-up
2006	Buenos Aires	Defensor Lima
2007	Defensor Piérola	Buenos Aires
2008	Defensor Lima	Defensor Piérola
2009	Deportivo Estrella	San Martín de Ocoña
2010	Buenos Aires	Defensor Lima
2011	Deportivo Esperanza	Deportivo Estrella
2012	José Granda	Deportivo Camaná
2013	Unión Huarangal	Defensor Piérola
2014	Unión Huarangal	José Granda
2015	Unión Huarangal	Deportivo Estrella
2016	San Jacinto	Buenos Aires
2017	Unión Huacapuy	Deportivo Estrella
2018	Buenos Aires	Defensor Lima
2019	San Jacinto	José Granda
2020	Canceled due to the COVID-19 pandemic	
2021	Canceled due to the COVID-19 pandemic	
2022	San Jacinto	Deportivo Estrella
2023	José Granda	Deportivo Porvenir
2024	Deportivo Estrella	Buenos Aires
2025	Deportivo Estrella	Deportivo Camaná
2026	Deportivo Camaná	Deportivo Estrella

=== Liga Provincial de Caravelí ===
==== List of champions ====
Season	Champion	Runner-up
2009	Cultural Panamericana	San Pedro de Chala
2010	San Pedro de Chala	Titán de Chala
2011	Centro Bella Unión	Cultural La Aguadita
2012	Unión Marítimo	Los Chinitos
2013	Juventud San Pedro	Unión Marítimo
2014	Los Chinitos	Mar Azul
2015	Juventud San Pedro	FBC Yauca
2016	Los Chinitos	FBC Yauca
2017	Los Chinitos	Cultural La Aguadita
2018	Juventud Chala	Los Chinitos
2019	Jorge Chávez de Atico	Íntimos de La Victoria
2020	Canceled due to the COVID-19 pandemic	
2021	Canceled due to the COVID-19 pandemic	
2022	Jorge Chávez de Atico	Juventud Bella Unión
2023	Viargoca	Jorge Chávez de Atico
2024	Viargoca	Los Chinitos
2025	Viargoca	Juventud Bella Unión
2026	Juventus Vista Alegre	Viargoca

=== Liga Provincial de Castilla ===
==== List of champions ====
Season	Champion	Runner-up
2009	Sport Perú	Escuela Municipal de Ocopampa
2010	Escuela Municipal de Orcopampa	Sport Perú
2011	Social Corire	Unión Minas de Orcopampa
2012	Alianza Metalúrgica	Juventud América Yaso
2013	Unión Minas de Orcopampa	Social Corire
2014	Social Corire	Deportivo Orcopampa
2015	Social Corire	Sport Perú
2016	Social Corire	Deportivo Orcopampa
2017	Social Corire	Juvenil Pampacolca
2018	Social Corire	Sport Perú
2019	Deportivo Orcopampa	San Vicente
2020	Canceled due to the COVID-19 pandemic	
2021	Canceled due to the COVID-19 pandemic	
2022	Rocket Boys	Sportivo Cosos
2023	Independiente La Real	Social Corire
2024	Espiga Dorada	Sport Perú
2025	Espiga Dorada	Rocket Boys
2026	Espiga Dorada	Sport Perú

=== Liga Provincial de Caylloma ===
==== List of champions ====
Season	Champion	Runner-up
2009	Unión Comerciantes	Atlético Pedregal
2010	Unión Comerciantes	Atlético Pedregal
2011	FBC Pulpera	Atlético Pedregal
2012	Sportivo Cariocos	FBC Pulpera
2013	Sportivo Cariocos	Futuro Majes
2014	Sportivo Cariocos	Futuro Majes
2015	La Colina	Social Tigre
2016	Juventus Corazón	La Colina
2017	Internacional Majes	Futuro Majes
2018	Social Andino	Futuro Majes
2019	Futuro Majes	Star Olimpia Lari
2020	Canceled due to the COVID-19 pandemic	
2021	Canceled due to the COVID-19 pandemic	
2022	Juventus Corazón	UD Cucho Capilla
2023	Real Pionero	Defensor Tuti
2024	Racing Colca	Deportivo Majes
2025	FD Galaxy	Sport El Alto
2026	Defensor Agrario	Deportivo Municipal (Majes)

=== Liga Provincial de Condesuyos ===
==== List of champions ====
Season	Champion	Runner-up
2009	Minero Charco	Juvenil Arequipa
2010	Juventus de Chuquibamba	Deportivo Rey de Andaray
2011	Atlanta Carmen Alto	Sport Rosario
2012	Juvenil Arequipa	Juvenil Yanaquihua
2013	San Juan de Chorunga	Defensor Copacabana
2014	Defensor Virgen de las Nieves	Deportivo Copacabana
2015	Atlanta Carmen Alto	San Juan de Chorunga
2016	Fuerza Minera	Juvenil Arequipa
2017	Minero Charco	Juvenil Arequipa
2018	Defensor Virgen de las Nieves	
2019	Ampliación Copacabana	Defensor Virgen de las Nieves
2020	Canceled due to the COVID-19 pandemic	
2021	Canceled due to the COVID-19 pandemic	
2022	San Juan de Chorunga	Juventud Apacroya
2023	Juventud Apacroya	San Juan de Chorunga
2024	Defensor Virgen de las Nieves	Deportivo Copacabana
2025	Deportivo Vallecito	Universitario de Papachacra
2026	Virgen de las Nieves	Deportivo Copacabana

=== Liga Provincial de Islay ===
==== List of champions ====
Season	Champion	Runner-up
2009	Deportivo Islay	Ramón Cáceres
2010	Francisco Bolognesi	Deportivo Colón
2011	Inclán Sport	Sport Boys
2012	Atlético Mollendo	Sport Arenal
2013	Alfonso Ugarte	Sport Chucarapi
2014	Atlético Mollendo	Sport Boys
2015	Atlético Mollendo	Los Amigos de Matarani
2016	Atlético Mollendo	Inclán Sport
2017	Sport Boys	Inclán Sport
2018	Sport Boys	Peloteros de Matarani
2019	Nacional	Sport Boys
2020	Canceled due to the COVID-19 pandemic	
2021	Canceled due to the COVID-19 pandemic	
2022	Nacional	Deportivo Colón
2023	Deportivo Colón	Nacional
2024	Nacional	Deportivo Colón
2025	Alto Inclán	Deportivo Colón
2026	Deportivo Colón	Sport Boys

== Ayacucho ==
=== Liga Provincial del Huanta ===
==== List of champions ====
Season	Champion	Runner-up
2010	Deportivo Municipal (Iguaín)	Sport Contreras
2011	Cultural Huracán	Sport Alameda
2012	Deportivo Municipal (Santillana)	Deportivo Municipal (Ayahuanco)
2013	Deportivo Municipal (Santillana)	Deportivo Municipal (Iguaín)
2014	Player Villafuerte	Deportivo Municipal (Iguaín)
2015	Player Villafuerte	Sport Huanta
2016	Sport Huanta	José Carlos Mariátegui (Iguaín)
2017	Player Villafuerte	Sport Huanta
2018	Sport Huanta	Player Villafuerte
2019	Player Villafuerte	Sport Huanta
2020	Canceled due to the COVID-19 pandemic	
2021	Canceled due to the COVID-19 pandemic	
2022	Cultural Huracán	Player Villafuerte
2023	Player Villafuerte	Nueva Generación
2024	Player Villafuerte	Cultural Huracán
2025	Cultural Huracán	Sport Municipal de Uchuraccay
2026	Unión Municipal de Aranhuay	Villa Barboza

=== Liga Provincial del Huamanga ===
==== List of champions ====
Season	Champion	Runner-up
2009	Defensor Huamanguilla	Santa Elena
2010	Defensor Acosvinchos	San Cristóbal de Casaorcco
2011	Sport Huracán	Juventud Pampamarca
2012	Percy Berrocal	Juventud Gloria-CACFMA
2013	Percy Berrocal	ULADECH Católica
2014	San Cristóbal de Casaorcco	Percy Berrocal
2015	Percy Berrocal	Gigantes de Seccelambra
2016	Roca Deportes	Independiente Orcasitas
2017	San Pedro de Mosoccallpa	Vista Alegre de Carmen Alto
2018	San Cristóbal de Casaorcco	Percy Berrocal
2019	UNSCH	Roca Deportes
2020	Canceled due to the COVID-19 pandemic	
2021	Canceled due to the COVID-19 pandemic	
2022	Sport Cáceres	Sport Contreras
2023	Sport Cáceres	Atlético Huamanga
2024	Señor de Quinuapata	Atlético Huamanga
2025	Sport Cáceres	Señor de Quinuapata
2026	Mercado de Productores	Por la Santa FC

== Cajamarca ==
=== Liga Provincial de Cajamarca ===
==== List of champions ====
Season	Champion	Runner-up
2009	Universidad Alas Peruanas	Descendencia Michiquillay
2010	Sport Universitario	Deportivo Zepita
2011	Cruzeiro Porcón	Alianza Cutervo
2012	Juvenil UTC	Cruzeiro Porcón
2013	Juvenil UTC	Sporting Caxamarca
2014	Juvenil UTC	Deportivo San Ramón
2015	Juvenil UTC	San Pedro
2016	Real JL	San Nicolás
2017	Real JL	San Nicolás
2018	Real JL	Juvenil UTC
2019	Real JJ	Defensor Baños del Inca
2020	Canceled due to the COVID-19 pandemic	
2021	Canceled due to the COVID-19 pandemic	
2022	Juvenil UTC	FC San Ramón
2023	Cajamarca	Defensor Michiquillay
2024	Cajamarca	UNC
2025	Gálvez FC	Ingeniería Máximo Nivel
2026	La Viña	Defensor Milpo

=== Liga Provincial de Cutervo ===
==== List of champions ====
Season	Champion	Runner-up
2008	Comerciantes Unidos	Estudiantes Casanovistas
2009	Carniche	Estudiantes Casanovistas
2010	Carniche	Deportivo Municipal
2011	Alianza Cutervo	San Ramón
2012	Alianza Cutervo	Carniche
2013	Comerciantes Unidos	Deportivo Huracán
2014	Los Inseparables	FEDIP
2015	Alianza Cutervo	Carniche
2016	No tournament	
2017	No tournament	
2018	Estudiantes Casanovistas	Nuevo Oriente
2019	No tournament	
2020	Canceled due to the COVID-19 pandemic	
2021	Canceled due to the COVID-19 pandemic	
2022	Nuevo Tiempo	Estudiantes Casanovistas
2023	Nuevo Tiempo	Juventud Tunasloma
2024	ACD Urcurume	Virgen de la Natividad
2025	Pueblo Nuevo de Sócota	Cultural San Lorenzo
2026	Deportivo Rodiopampa	Deportivo Arena Blanca

=== Liga Provincial del Hualgayoc ===
==== List of champions ====
Season	Champion	Runner-up
2012	Sport Agropecuario	ABX
2013	Sport Boys	Unión San Antonio
2014	Cultural Volante	Emilio Montoya
2015	Deportivo Hualgayoc	Unión Bambamarca
2016	Deportivo Hualgayoc	Sport Coymolache
2017	Libertador Frutillo	4 de Octubre
2018	Cultural Volante	Libertador Frutillo
2019	Cultural Volante	Deportivo Coremarca
2020	Canceled due to the COVID-19 pandemic	
2021	Canceled due to the COVID-19 pandemic	
2022	Cultural Volante	El Bosque
2023	Cultural Volante	Joaquín Bernal
2024	Cultural Volante	Deportivo Chala
2025	Deportivo Municipal (San Juan)	Academia Pedro Nolasco
2026	FC San Carlos	AD Internacional

=== Liga Provincial del Jaén ===
==== List of champions ====
Season	Champion	Runner-up
2009	Morro Solar	UDCH
2010	Sangre del Pueblo	UDCH
2011	Deportivo Municipal (Chontalí)	UDCH
2012	Deportivo Bellavista	ADA
2013	Academia Municipal	ADA
2014	ADA	Deportivo Bellavista
2015	UDCH	Real Puentecillo
2016	Sangre del Pueblo	Alianza Porvenir
2017	ADA	Unión Juvenil
2018	ADA	Deportivo Bracamoros
2019	ADA	Deportivo Bracamoros
2020	Canceled due to the COVID-19 pandemic	
2021	Canceled due to the COVID-19 pandemic	
2022	UDCH	Señor Cautivo
2023	Señor Cautivo	ADA
2024	Señor de los Milagros	Zamudio
2025	Señor de los Milagros	Deportivo Bracamoros
2026	Sangre del Pueblo	Deportivo Bracamoros

== Cusco ==
=== Liga Provincial de Anta ===
==== List of champions ====
Season	Champion	Runner-up
2012	Defensor Limatambo	Virgen del Carmen
2013	Fedical Limatambo	Colegio Nacional Limatambo
2014	Santa Ana de Chacán	Millonarios
2015	Defensor Zurite	Magisterio
2016	Juventus Mollepata	Agustín Gamarra
2017	San Cristóbal de Rahuanqui	Agustín Gamarra
2018	Deportivo Municipal	Agustín Gamarra
2019	Audaces de Pucyura	Santa Rosa de Ancahuasi
2020	Canceled due to the COVID-19 pandemic	
2021	Canceled due to the COVID-19 pandemic	
2022	Real José María Arguedas	Defensor Cachimayo
2023	San Cristóbal de Rahuanqui	Santa Rosa de Ancahuasi
2024	Circa Kcacya	Defensor Sondorf
2025	Rio Blanco Sauceda	Audaces de Pucyura
2026	Millonarios	Agustín Gamarra

=== Liga Provincial de Calca ===
==== List of champions ====
Season	Champion	Runner-up
2012	Estudiantes Agropecuario	Estudiantes Písac
2013	Humberto Luna	Deportivo Municipal (Lares)
2014	Señor de Huanca	Humberto Luna
2015	AJI	Humberto Luna
2016	AJI	Defensor Yanatile
2017	Defensor Yanatile	Humberto Luna
2018	Deportivo Robles	Los Tigres
2019	AJI	Los Tigres
2020	Canceled due to the COVID-19 pandemic	
2021	Canceled due to the COVID-19 pandemic	
2022	AJI	Defensor Yanatile
2023	AJI	Señor Justo Juez
2024	AJI	Juventud Alfa
2025	Señor Justo Juez	Unión Porvenir Coya
2026	Unión Porvenir Coya	AJI

=== Liga Provincial del Cusco ===
==== List of champions ====
Season	Champion	Runner-up
2007	Deportivo Garcilaso	
2008	Deportivo Garcilaso	
2009	Deportivo Garcilaso	Cienciano Junior
2010	Real Garcilaso	Deportivo Garcilaso
2011	Deportivo Garcilaso	Deportivo Volcán
2012	Deportivo Garcilaso	Cienciano Junior
2013	Cienciano Junior	Deportivo Garcilaso
2014	Deportivo Garcilaso	Cienciano Junior
2015	Cienciano Junior	Deportivo Garcilaso
2016	Deportivo Garcilaso	Ingeniería Civil
2017	Universidad Andina	Ingeniería Civil
2018	Deportivo Garcilaso	Universidad Andina
2019	Deportivo Garcilaso	Pluma de Oro
2020	Canceled due to the COVID-19 pandemic	
2021	Canceled due to the COVID-19 pandemic	
2022	Deportivo Garcilaso	Pluma de Oro
2023	Pluma de Oro	Juventud Progreso
2024	Jesuscelence	Juventud Progreso
2025	Sport Liberales	Universidad Andina
2026	Alianza Zarzuela	Jesuscelence

=== Liga Provincial de Espinar ===
==== List of champions ====
Season	Champion	Runner-up
2009	Real Municipal (Coporaque)	Deportivo Municipal (Yauri)
2010	Real Municipal (Coporaque)	Deportivo Tintaya
2011	Real Municipal (Coporaque)	Deportivo Municipal (Espinar)
2012	Real Municipal (Coporaque)	Deportivo Municipal (Espinar)
2013	Real Municipal (Coporaque)	Moro Alccasa
2014	Unión Alto Huarca	Deportivo Municipal (Alto Pichigua)
2015	Real Municipal (Coporaque)	Unión Alto Huarca
2016	Unión Alto Huarca	Los Nevados
2017	Real Municipal (Coporaque)	Defensor Molloccahua
2018	Unión Alto Huarca	Alianza Corazón
2019	Defensor Huisa Ccollana	Real K'anamarca
2020	Canceled due to the COVID-19 pandemic	
2021	Canceled due to the COVID-19 pandemic	
2022	Defensor Cubillas	Real Escorpión Safey
2023	Defensor Cubillas	Real Municipal (Coporaque)
2024	Real Municipal (Coporaque)	Estrellas Chilca
2025	Estrellas Chilca	UNISPA
2026	UNISPA	Juventus Estrellas

== Huancavelica ==
=== Liga Provincial de Acobamba ===
==== List of champions ====
Season	Champion	Runner-up
2010	Mariano Santos	Huracán de Acobamba
2011	Deportivo Municipal (Paucará)	
2012	Cultural Cahuide	Defensor Cchoclococha
2013	Deportivo Municipal (Paucará)	Mariano Santos
2014	Tucumán de Choclococha	Mariano Santos
2015	Mariano Santos	
2016	Defensor Mercurio	Cultural Cahuide
2017	Deportivo Agronomía	Defensor Paucará
2018	La Florida de Paucará	Defensor Choclococha
2019	Los Libertadores de Paucará	Deportivo Agronomía
2020	Canceled due to the COVID-19 pandemic	
2021	Canceled due to the COVID-19 pandemic	
2022	Estrella Central	
2023	Defensor Choclococha	Dos de Mayo
2024	Defensor Bellavista	ADHES Paucará
2025	Niño Jesús de Pueblo Viejo	Unión Pillcosay
2026	San Martín de Mayunmarca	ADHES Paucará

=== Liga Provincial de Angaraes ===
==== List of champions ====
Season	Champion	Runner-up
2010	Alianza Lircay	INGEOMIN
2011	Unión Minas de Ccochaccasa	
2012	Hidros de Tucsipampa	Alianza Lircay
2013	Alianza Lircay	Social Lircay
2014	Social Lircay	Águila Real
2015	Rosario Central	
2016	FC Huayrapata	Unión Comercio
2017	FC Huayrapata	Sport Azafrán
2018	Social Casacancha	Jatumpata
2019	Deportivo Atlas	Sport Diamantes
2020	Canceled due to the COVID-19 pandemic	
2021	Canceled due to the COVID-19 pandemic	
2022	Sport Anqara	FC Tambo
2023	Social Lircay	UDA Allato
2024	FIMCA UNH	Sport Machete
2025	Sport Machete	FIMCA UNH
2026	Sport Machete	Sport Águila

=== Liga Provincial de Huancavelica ===
==== List of champions ====
Season	Champion	Runner-up
2009	Diablos Rojos	Santa Rosa
2010	Santa Rosa	UDA
2011	Racing FBC	Universitario de Pucarumi
2012	UDA	Deportivo Municipal (Yauli)
2013	Racing FBC	Santa Rosa
2014	Racing FBC	Santa Rosa
2015	UDA	Racing FBC
2016	UDA	Cultural Bolognesi
2017	Diablos Rojos	UDA
2018	UDA	Deportivo Caminos
2019	Unión Quichuas	Santa Rosa
2020	Canceled due to the COVID-19 pandemic	
2021	Canceled due to the COVID-19 pandemic	
2022	UNH	Deportivo Vianney
2023	Deportivo Vianney	Diablos Rojos
2024	UD Calvario	UDA
2025	Diablos Rojos	UNH
2026	Diablos Rojos	Heraldos Negros

== Huánuco ==
=== Liga Provincial de Huamalíes ===
==== List of champions ====
Season	Champion	Runner-up
2009	Defensor Cuyacu	Deportivo Municipal (Llata)
2010	Palo Acero	Unión Sachavaca
2011	Juventud Raymondina	Deportivo Manchuria
2012	León de Collana	Defensor Manchuria
2013	Defensor Manchuria	Chacarita Junior
2014	Defensor Social El Amauta	Chacarita Junior
2015	Real Espino	Cadech de Chinchay
2016	Familia Salas	Sol Naciente
2017	Atlético Huamaliano	Deportivo Municipal (Llata)
2018	Sachavaca FC	Deportivo Municipal (Llata)
2019	Juventud Camote	Flamengo de Cashapampa
2020	Canceled due to the COVID-19 pandemic	
2021	Canceled due to the COVID-19 pandemic	
2022	Defensor Manchuria	Juventud Raymondina
2023	Colegio Javier Purgar	Deportivo Municipal (Llata)
2024	Real Espino	Juana Moreno Rico Colón
2025	Familia Caqui	Terror de la Selva
2026	Sport Cachicoto	Paucaco

=== Liga Provincial de Huánuco ===
==== List of champions ====
Season	Champion	Runner-up
2009	UNHEVAL	Santa Rosa Junior
2010	UNHEVAL	Santa Rosa Junior
2011	Santa Rosa Junior	UNHEVAL
2012	UNHEVAL	Sport Zona Cero
2013	UNHEVAL	Social del Valle
2014	Sport Zona Cero	UNHEVAL
2015	Cultural Tarapacá	Los Ángeles
2016	Cultural Tarapacá	Dos de Enero
2017	UNHEVAL	Miguel Grau UDH
2018	Alianza Universidad	León de Huánuco
2019	Miguel Grau UDH	Dos de Enero
2020	Canceled due to the COVID-19 pandemic	
2021	Canceled due to the COVID-19 pandemic	
2022	Independiente San Luis	Atlético San Martín
2023	Independiente de Huachog	Construcción Civil
2024	Construcción Civil	León de Huánuco FC
2025	León de Huánuco	Deportivo Pujay
2026	Atlético EVZA	Miguel Grau UDH

=== Liga Provincial de Tocache ===
==== List of champions ====
Season	Champion	Runner-up
2009	AD Obrero	Magisterio
2010	AD Obrero	Unión Bambamarca
2011	Deportivo Guantánamo	Deportivo Tocache
2012	Deportivo Porvenir Km. 9	Deportivo Guantánamo
2013	Santa Lucía de Uchiza	Unión Peñarol
2014	Juventud La Palma	Instituto Tecnológico
2015	Sport Boys	Nuevo Horizonte
2016	Social Molope La Morada	Santo Domingo de Guzmán
2017	Santa Lucía de Uchiza	ISTPAHT
2018	Juventud La Palma	Paraíso de Progreso
2019	Santa Lucía de Uchiza	Deportivo Municipal (Progreso)
2020	Canceled due to the COVID-19 pandemic	
2021	Canceled due to the COVID-19 pandemic	
2022	Luis Cruzado	Juventud La Palma
2023	Juventud La Palma	Porongo
2024	Juventud La Palma	Independiente
2025	Defensor Progreso	Juventud La Palma
2026	Constructores de Uchiza	Muni Huayranga

== Ica ==
=== Liga Provincial de Chincha ===
==== List of champions ====
Season	Champion	Runner-up
2007	Juventud Miraflores	Juventud Palmeiras
2008	Unión San Martín	Dos de Mayo
2009	Juventud Media Luna	Defensor Mayta Cápac
2010	Defensor Mayta Cápac	Eleven Boys
2011	Juventud Palmeiras	Unión La Calera
2012	Defensor Mayta Cápac	Juventud Balconcito
2013	Los Bombones	Unión La Calera
2014	Once Amigos	Unión La Calera
2015	Parada de los Amigos	Deportivo Gavilán
2016	Unión La Calera	Parada de los Amigos
2017	Parada de los Amigos	Juventud Balconcito
2018	La Palma	Juventud Cruz del Rosario
2019	AJEC	Santos
2020	Canceled due to the COVID-19 pandemic	
2021	Canceled due to the COVID-19 pandemic	
2022	Juventud Cruz del Rosario	Juventud Primavera
2023	Amigos de San Luis	Juventud Primavera
2024	Juan XXIII	Asociación Cultural
2025	Amigos del Barrio	Juventud Progreso
2026	Domingo Dianderas	AD Huampullo

=== Liga Provincial de Ica ===
==== List of champions ====
Season	Champion	Runner-up
2009	Barcelona de Parcona	Olímpico Peruano
2010	Sport Victoria	Unión Estudiantes
2011	Unión Estudiantes	Sport Huracán
2012	Octavio Espinosa	Barcelona de Parcona
2013	Octavio Espinosa	Juventus
2014	Unión Estudiantes	Carlos Orellana
2015	Juventud Barrio Nuevo	Deportivo Huracán
2016	Carlos Orellana	Octavio Espinosa
2017	Juventud Barrio Nuevo	18 de Febrero
2018	Barcelona de Parcona	Sport Marino
2019	Octavio Espinosa	Sport Marino
2020	Canceled due to the COVID-19 pandemic	
2021	Canceled due to the COVID-19 pandemic	
2022	18 de Febrero	Octavio Espinosa
2023	18 de Febrero	Barcelona de Parcona
2024	Sport Nacional	Atlético Nacional
2025	Sport Nacional	Sport Puerto Aéreo
2026	Atlético Nacional	Sporting Cristal (Parcona)

=== Liga Provincial de Nasca ===
==== List of champions ====
Season	Champion	Runner-up
2009	Defensor Zarumilla	Juventud Guadalupe
2010	Defensor Zarumilla	Independiente Cantayo
2011	Defensor Zarumilla	Defensor Mayta Cápac
2012	Defensor Mayta Cápac	Santos
2013	José Olaya	Independiente Cantayo
2014	Defensor Zarumilla	Juan Matta
2015	Juventud Santa Fe	Independiente Cantayo
2016	Defensor Zarumilla	Francisco Oropeza
2017	Independiente Cantayo	Defensor Zarumilla
2018	Santos	Defensor Zarumilla
2019	Defensor Mina	Defensor Zarumilla
2020	Canceled due to the COVID-19 pandemic	
2021	Canceled due to the COVID-19 pandemic	
2022	San Pedro	José Olaya
2023	José Olaya	San Pedro
2024	Juventud Santo Domingo	Dos de Mayo
2025	Juventud Santa Fe	Independiente Cantayo
2026	Juventud Santa Fe	Deportivo Municipal

=== Liga Provincial de Lucanas - Parinacochas (Ayacucho Province) ===
==== List of champions ====
Season	Champion	Runner-up
2009	José María Arguedas	José Carlos Mariátegui
2010	ISP Filiberto García	Deportivo Centenario
2011	Social Buena Vista	José María Arguedas
2012	ISP Filiberto García	Deportivo Puquio
2013	ISP Filiberto García	Lolo Fernández
2014	Unión Progresista	Deportivo Municipal
2015	Lolo Fernández	Real Corona
2016	Deportivo Santa Ana	Niño Jesús
2017	Juventud Progresista	Domingo Ayarza
2018	Juventud Progresista	Instituto Pedagógico
2019	Atlético Cantolao de Pauza	Deportivo San Antonio
2020	Canceled due to the COVID-19 pandemic	
2021	Canceled due to the COVID-19 pandemic	
2022	Lolo Fernández	Defensor San Pedro
2023	Lolo Fernández	Deportivo Puquio
2024	Lolo Fernández	José María Arguedas
2025	Deportivo Puquio	Juventud Ccontacc
2026	Lolo Fernández	Juventud Ccontacc

=== Liga Provincial de Palpa ===
==== List of champions ====
Season	Champion	Runner-up
2009	Deportivo América	Los Gatos
2010	Alfonso Ugarte	Deportivo América
2011	Deportivo América	Independiente Piedras Gordas
2012	Deportivo América	Deportivo Municipal
2013	Deportivo Garcilaso	Deportivo América
2014	Deportivo América	Deportivo Municipal (Río Grande)
2015	Deportivo América	Defensor Sacramento
2016	Deportivo América	Jhori Vizcas
2017	Deportivo América	Unión San Martín
2018	Deportivo América	Unión San Martín
2019	Juventud Aurora	Independiente del Valle
2020	Canceled due to the COVID-19 pandemic	
2021	Canceled due to the COVID-19 pandemic	
2022	Real Miraflores	Deportivo América
2023	Deportivo América	Los Gatos
2024	Santa Rosa	Deportivo América
2025	Defensor Alfonso Ugarte	DAT Agropecuarios
2026	DAT Agropecuarios	Juventud Real Miraflores

=== Liga Provincial de Pisco ===
==== List of champions ====
Season	Champion	Runner-up
2007	Alianza Pisco	Juventud Santa Cruz
2008	Unión San Martín	Juventud Santa Cruz
2009	Alianza Pisco	Hungaritos
2010	Joe Gutiérrez	Unión San Martín
2011	Alianza Pisco	José Olaya
2012	Casalla Junior	Manuel Carrillo
2013	Defensor San Tadeo	San Ignacio
2014	José Olaya	San Ignacio
2015	Deportivo Villa Rica	San Tadeo
2016	Universitario	Unión San Martín
2017	Unión San Martín	Los Libertadores
2018	Sport San Clemente	Juventud Santa Rosa
2019	Las Américas	Olímpico
2020	Canceled due to the COVID-19 pandemic	
2021	Canceled due to the COVID-19 pandemic	
2022	Los Libertadores	Olímpico
2023	Alianza Pisco	Cultural Melchorita
2024	Juventud Santa Cruz	Alianza Pisco
2025	Manuel Gonzáles Prada	Alianza Pisco
2026	Bad Boys	Juventud Lircay

== Junín ==
=== Liga Provincial de Huancayo ===
==== List of champions ====
Season	Champion	Runner-up
2009	Sporting Chilca	Flamengo
2010	Centro Unión Chupuro	Pianto
2011	Deportivo Sucre	Águilas Virgen de Cocharcas
2012	Santa Rosa de Huancán	Santa Rosa PNP
2013	CESA	Sport Águila
2014	Santa Rosa PNP	Santa Rosa de Huancán
2015	Santa Rosa PNP	Trilce Internacional
2016	Santa Rosa PNP	Sport Águila
2017	Escuela JTR	AD Triyunix
2018	Escuela JTR	CESA
2019	CESA	Escuela JTR
2020	Canceled due to the COVID-19 pandemic	
2021	Canceled due to the COVID-19 pandemic	
2022	AFAR Shalom	CESA
2023	Estrella Central	Unión Pilcomayo
2024	Deportivo Sucre	Atlético Wanka
2025	Atlético Sumar Motos	CESA
2026	CESA	Atlético Sumar Motos

=== Liga Provincial de Satipo ===
==== List of champions ====
Season	Champion	Runner-up
2009	Alipio Ponce	Defensor Satipo
2010	Alipio Ponce	Deportivo Municipal (Mazamari)
2011	Alipio Ponce	Deportivo Municipal (Mazamari)
2012	Alipio Ponce	Deportivo Municipal (Mazamari)
2013	Alipio Ponce	Colegio Nacional San Martín
2014	Alipio Ponce	
2015	Alipio Ponce	José Olaya
2016	Alipio Ponce	Señor de Muruhuay
2017	Alipio Ponce	Sport Camantaro
2018	Alipio Ponce	Santa Leonor
2019	Alipio Ponce	Deportivo Municipal (Rio Negro)
2020	Canceled due to the COVID-19 pandemic	
2021	Canceled due to the COVID-19 pandemic	
2022	Alipio Ponce	Racing Satipo
2023	Racing Satipo	Sport Gavilán
2024	Deportivo Municipal (Pangoa)	Alipio Ponce
2025	Sport Gavilán	Racing Satipo
2026	Racing Satipo	Alipio Ponce

=== Liga Provincial de Tarma ===
==== List of champions ====
Season	Champion	Runner-up
2007	ADT	Sport Dos de Mayo
2008	Sport Dos de Mayo	Unión Juventud Carhuacatac
2009	Unión Juventud Carhuacatac	ADT
2010	Sport Dos de Mayo	ADT
2011	Unión Juventud Carhuacatac	Independiente de Palcamayo
2012	Cultural Vicentina	Sao Paulo Vicentino
2013	Unión Juventud Carhuacátac	Sport Dos de Mayo
2014	ADT	Unión Leticia
2015	ADT	Sport Dos de Mayo
2016	Sport Dos de Mayo	ADT
2017	ADT	Sport San Cristóbal
2018	Sport Dos de Mayo	ADT
2019	ADT	Sport San Cristóbal
2020	Canceled due to the COVID-19 pandemic	
2021	Canceled due to the COVID-19 pandemic	
2022	Estrella de Palca	Porvenir Miraflores
2023	Sport Dos de Mayo	Deportivo Llanco
2024	Progreso Muruhuay	Sport Dos de Mayo
2025	Progreso Muruhuay	Familia Estrella
2026	AD Cóndor	Los Canarios

== La Libertad ==
=== Liga Provincial de Ascope ===
==== List of champions ====
Season	Champion	Runner-up
2012	Sporting Tabaco	Juventud Moderna
2013	Unión Chiquitoy	Juventud Grau
2014	Sporting Tabaco	Avícola Lescano
2015	Rafael Químper	Sporting Tabaco
2016	7 de Junio	Juventud Grau
2017	Sporting Tabaco	Augusto Gildemeister
2018	Bolognesi de Sausal	Unión Magdalena
2019	Real Casa Grande	Sporting Tabaco
2020	Canceled due to the COVID-19 pandemic	
2021	Canceled due to the COVID-19 pandemic	
2022	Ángel Avilés	Juventud Grau
2023	Deportivo Magaru	Ángel Avilés
2024	Juventud Grau	Sporting Tabaco
2025	Amaro Alza Arbulú	Defensor Macabí
2026	Defensor Macabí	Amaro Alza Arbulú

=== Liga Provincial de Chepén ===
==== List of champions ====
Season	Champion	Runner-up
2012	Defensor Bolivar	Transporte San Ildefonso
2013	Inter Molino	Mariscal Sucre
2014	Mariscal Sucre	Estrella Roja
2015	Defensor Bolivar	Mariscal Sucre
2016	Mariscal Sucre	San Agustín (Pueblo Nuevo)
2017	Mariscal Sucre	Best Cable
2018	Defensor Bolivar	Barcelona (Pueblo Nuevo)
2019	Defensor Catalina	Defensor Lurífico
2020	Canceled due to the COVID-19 pandemic	
2021	Canceled due to the COVID-19 pandemic	
2022	Deportivo Municipal (Pacanga)	San Juan de Dios
2023	San Vicente de Pueblo Nuevo	Unión Chequén
2024	Sport Real	Unión Pueblo Nuevo
2025	Miguel Grau	El Salvador
2026	Defensor El Óvalo	Mariscal Sucre

=== Liga Provincial de Pacasmayo ===
==== List of champions ====
Ed.	Season	Champion	Runner-up
1	1974	Cementos Pacasmayo	Dos de Mayo (Chepén)
2	1975	Alianza San José	Los Espartanos
3	1976	Alianza San José	Unión Cultambo
4	1977	Atlético Municipal (Chepén)	Los Espartanos
5	1978	Los Espartanos	Atlético Municipal (Chepén)
6	1979	Los Espartanos	Defensor San Pedro
7	1980	Sport Pilsen	Atlético Municipal (Chepén)
8	1981	Sport Pilsen	Atlético Municipal (Chepén)
9	1982	Sport Pilsen	Cementos Pacasmayo
10	1983	Los Espartanos	Atlético Municipal (Chepén)
11	1984	Cementos Pacasmayo	Defensor San Pedro
12	1985	Alianza San Pedro	Defensor Chepén
13	1986	Unión Cultambo	Tigres del Centenario
14	1987	Guardia Civil	Unión Cultambo
15	1988	Guardia Civil	
16	1989	Alianza Guadalupe	Cementos Pacasmayo
17	1990	Cementos Pacasmayo	Alianza San Pedro
18	1991	Cabaña	Alianza Guadalupe
19	1992	Unión Cultambo	Deportivo Crackers
20	1993	Alianza Guadalupe	
21	1994	Cementos Pacasmayo	Alianza Guadalupe
22	1995	Los Chavelines	Colegio San José
23	1996	Águilas Unidas	Unión Cultambo
24	1997	Defensor Calera	Sport Rayo
25	1998	Juvenil Victoria	
26	1999	Los Chavelines	Defensor San Pedro
27	2000	Juvenil Victoria	Deportivo México
28	2001	Juvenil Victoria	Defensor Calera
29	2002	Torbellino	
30	2003	Cerro Porteño	Torbellino
31	2004	Cerro Porteño	Unión San Pedro
32	2005	Cerro Porteño	Cruzeiro
33	2006	Cruzeiro	Defensor San Pedro
34	2007		
35	2008	Alameda Puente Arco	San Lorenzo
36	2009	Unión Cultambo	San Lorenzo
37	2010	Alianza Guadalupe	Los Porteños
38	2011	Cerro Porteño	Los Porteños
39	2012	Alianza Guadalupe	Tigres del Centenario
40	2013	Torbellino	El Porvenir
41	2014	Sport Chavelines	Torbellino
42	2015	Torbellino	Alianza Guadalupe
43	2016	Alianza Guadalupe	Sport Chavelines
44	2017	Defensor Calera	Sport Chavelines
45	2018	Juventud Progresista	Torbellino
46	2019	Sport Chavelines	Atlético Verdún
–	2020	Canceled due to the COVID-19 pandemic	
–	2021	Canceled due to the COVID-19 pandemic	
47	2022	Real Alianza	Atlético Verdún
48	2023	Atlético Verdún	Agrosa Cultambo
49	2024	Academia Juan Seminario	Cruzeiro
50	2025	Academia Juan Seminario	Real San Pablo
51	2026	Palmeiras	ADEJ

=== Liga Provincial de Pataz ===
==== List of champions ====
Season	Champion	Runner-up
2012	Deportivo Marsa	Deportivo Municipal
2013	Deportivo Llacuabamba	Sport Huaylillas
2014	Defensor Tayabamba	Deportivo Llacuabamba
2015	Deportivo Llacuabamba	
2016	San Pedro del Valle	Trabajadores Municipales
2017	No tournament	
2018	No tournament	
2019	Deportivo Llacuabamba	
2020	Canceled due to the COVID-19 pandemic	
2021	Canceled due to the COVID-19 pandemic	
2022	Unión Pataz	
2023	Unión Pataz	San Pedro del Valle
2024	San Pedro del Valle	Sport Tayabamba
2025	Deportivo Municipal	Unión Juventud Llacuabamba
2026	Unión Juventud Llacuabamba	José Olaya

=== Liga Provincial de Sánchez Carrión ===
==== List of champions ====
Season	Champion	Runner-up
2006	Racing	
2008	Racing	
2009	Alianza Huamachuco	
2010	Miguel Grau	Racing
2011	Miguel Grau	Racing
2012	Defensor Torino	Racing
2013	Deportivo Municipal	Racing
2014	Deportivo Municipal	Racing
2015	Racing	Real Sociedad
2016	Juventus	Racing
2017	Miguel Grau	Independiente (Chugay)
2018	Racing	Real Huamachuco
2019	Real Sociedad	
2020	Canceled due to the COVID-19 pandemic	
2021	Canceled due to the COVID-19 pandemic	
2022	Racing	
2023	Unión Huamachuco	Deportivo Sausacocha
2024	Juventus	Unión Juventud Cristal
2025	Sporting Huamachuco	Independiente de Gala
2026	Sporting Huamachuco	Arriba Perú

=== Liga Provincial de Trujillo ===
==== List of champions ====
Season	Champion	Runner-up
2008	Carlos A. Mannucci	Defensor Porvenir
2009	Universitario de Trujillo	Carlos A. Mannucci
2010	Sport Vallejo	Carlos Tenaud
2011	Universitario de Trujillo	Inter FC
2012	Juventud Bellavista	Universitario UPAO
2013	Universitario UPAO	Carlos A. Mannucci
2014	Universitario UPAO	Juventud Bellavista
2015	Carlos Tenaud	Víctor Arana Los Mangos
2016	Defensor Porvenir	Juventud Unida
2017	Alfonso Ugarte de Chiclín	Municipal FC
2018	Atlético Medellín	Alianza Libertad
2019	Ases del Barrio	Deportivo Diamante
2020	Canceled due to the COVID-19 pandemic	
2021	Canceled due to the COVID-19 pandemic	
2022	Training Gol	Deportivo El Rayo
2023	Alfonso Ugarte de Chiclín	Defensor Porvenir
2024	Sport River	Training Gol
2025	Sport River	Juventud Bellavista
2026	Juventud Bellavista	Sport River

=== Liga Provincial de Virú ===
==== List of champions ====
Season	Champion	Runner-up
2007	El Inca	
2008	El Inca	
2009	El Inca	
2010	6 de Septiembre	
2011	El Inca	
2012	Unión Viru	El Inca
2013	Universitario Guadalupito	Juventud Chao
2014	El Inca	Independiente
2015	Juventud Chao	Universitario Guadalupito
2016	El Inca	Nuevo Horizonte
2017	El Inca	Defensor Tanguche
2018	El Inca	Defensor Tanguche
2019	El Inca	Los Pinos de Chao
2020	Canceled due to the COVID-19 pandemic	
2021	Canceled due to the COVID-19 pandemic	
2022	No tournament	
2023	El Inca	Comunal San José
2024	El Inca	Deportivo Nuevo Chao
2025	El Inca	Deportivo Nuevo Chao
2026	El Inca	Unión Juventud Mochica

== Lambayeque ==
=== Liga Provincial de Chiclayo ===
==== List of champions ====
Season	Champion	Runner-up
2007	Universidad Señor de Sipán	Juan Pardo y Miguel
2009	Unión Tumán	
2010	Rayos-X Medicina	Los Caimanes
2011	Flamengo	
2012	Willy Serrato	Construcción Civil
2013	La Nueva Alianza	Deportivo Albertseb
2014	Alianza Vista Alegre	Sport José Pardo
2015	Construcción Civil	Sport José Pardo
2016	Pirata	Rayos-X Medicina
2017	Juan Aurich (Chongoyape)	Carlos Stein
2018	Carlos Stein	Pirata
2019	Carlos Stein	Defensor Cabrera
2020	Canceled due to the COVID-19 pandemic	
2021	Canceled due to the COVID-19 pandemic	
2022	Boca Juniors	Deportivo Lute
2023	Deportivo Lute	Juan Pablo II College
2024	Defensor Oyotún	Zelada Junior
2025	San Alberto de Patapo	Deportivo Tumi
2026	Deportivo Bolognesi	Deportivo Tumi

=== Liga Provincial de Ferreñafe ===
==== List of champions ====
Season	Champion	Runner-up
2007	Mariscal Sucre	Juan Aurich Pastor
2008	Juan Aurich Pastor	
2009	Amigos de la Policía	
2010	Divino Niño del Milagro	
2011	Simón Bolívar	
2012	Juventud Melgar	KDT Nacional
2013	Augusto B. Leguía	Sporting Cristal
2014	Augusto B. Leguía	
2015	Estrella Roja	
2016	Manuel Casimiro Chumán	Juan Aurich Pastor
2017	Juan Aurich Pastor	Manuel Casimiro Chumán
2018	Manuel Casimiro Chumán	
2019	Manuel Casimiro Chumán	Juventud San Martín
2020	Canceled due to the COVID-19 pandemic	
2021	Canceled due to the COVID-19 pandemic	
2022	Estrella Roja	La Balsa
2023	Manuel Gonzáles Prada	Jesús Monterroso
2024	Manuel Gonzáles Prada	Juan Aurich Pastor
2025	Las Mercedes	Manuel Gonzáles Prada
2026	Tambo Real	Dos de Mayo (Pativilca)

=== Liga Provincial de Lambayeque ===
==== List of champions ====
Season	Champion	Runner-up
2007	Cruz de Chalpón	Juan Aurich (Pacora)
2008	Defensor Pueblo Nuevo	
2009	Cruz de Chalpón	Deportivo Cachorro
2010	Juventud La Joya	
2011	Cruz de Chalpón	
2012	Cruz de Chalpón	Chacarita Juniors
2013	Virgen del Carmen	Isabel Coronado
2014	Atlético Bolognesi	
2015	Defensor Jayanca	Sport Chorrillos (Olmos)
2016	Sport Chorrillos (Olmos)	Sport Soriano
2017	Vasco de Gama	AJEC
2018	Santo Domingo	
2019	JJ Arquitectura	Deportivo América
2020	Canceled due to the COVID-19 pandemic	
2021	Canceled due to the COVID-19 pandemic	
2022	Juventud La Joya	JJ Arquitectura
2023	Toribia Castro	Vasco da Gama
2024	Santa Rosa	Deportivo Municipal (Túcume)
2025	Deportivo Cachorro	Vasco da Gama
2026	Cruz de Chalpón	San Miguel

== Lima ==
=== Liga Provincial de Lima (Interligas de Lima) ===
==== List of champions ====
Ed.	Season	Champion	Runner-up
1	1974	Compañía Peruana de Teléfonos	Papelera Atlas
2	1975	Aurora Miraflores	Deportivo Bancoper
3	1976	Universidad Federico Villareal	Bata Sol
4	1977	Universidad Federico Villareal	Papelera Atlas
5	1978	Deportivo Bancoper	Papelera Atlas
6	1979	Papelera Atlas	Aurora Miraflores
7	1980	Unión González Prada	Defensor Lima
8	1981	Barcelona	Defensor Lima
9	1982	Unión González Prada	Esther Grande de Bentín
10	1983	Barcelona	Esther Grande de Bentín
11	1984	ETE	Guardia Republicana
12	1985	Guardia Republicana	Tejidos La Unión
13	1986	Ingenio Puente Piedra	Esther Grande de Bentín
14	1987	Defensor Rímac	Real Olímpico
15	1988	Enrique Lau Chun; Defensor Kiwi	—
16	1989	Mercado Mayorista	Juventud Huascarán
17	1990	Cosmos 2000	Textil San Pedro
18	1991	Alcides Vigo	Centro Iqueño
19	1992	América Cochahuayco	
20	1993	Mixto Estudiantil	José Carlos Mariátegui
21	1994	Sport Agustino	Deportivo Municipal (Chorrillos)
22	1995	Virgen de Chapi	Santa Maria Norte
23	1996	AELU	Deportivo Repcel
24	1997	Virgen de Chapi	
25	1998	Deportivo Seman FAP	Deportivo Repcel
26	1999	Olímpico San Luis	Juventud Chacarilla de Otero
27	2000	Universidad San Marcos	Juventud Chacarilla de Otero
28	2001	Defensor Villa del Mar	Atlético Piedra Liza
29	2002	La Peña Sporting	Deportivo Municipal (Chorrillos)
30	2003	San José Joyeros	Águilas de América
31	2004	América Cochahuayco	Águilas de América
32	2005	Hijos de Acosvinchos	Óscar Benavides
33	2006	Jorge Chávez	Hijos de Acosvinchos
34	2007	Cooperativa Bolognesi	Óscar Benavides
35	2008	Raymondi Cashapampa	Asociación Caly
36	2009	DIM	Juventud La Rural
37	2010	Cultural 13 de Enero	Géminis
38	2011	Pacífico	DIM
39	2012	Deportivo Municipal	DIM
40	2013	DIM	Estudiantil Ascope
41	2014	Juventud América	Liga V Zona
42	2015	DIM	Cultural Comas
43	2016	Juventud América	Cultural Progreso
44	2017	Somos Olímpico	Alianza Pizarro
45	2018	Géminis	Defensor Lubricantes
46	2019	DIM	Hender Morales
–	2020	Canceled due to the COVID-19 pandemic	
–	2021	Canceled due to the COVID-19 pandemic	
47	2022	Independiente San Felipe	Barranco City
48	2023	AFE Cosmos International	Barranco City
49	2024	Arsenal Lawn Tennis	Pacífico
50	2025	Juniors de América	Sol de Vitarte
51	2026	Regatas Lima	América Santa Isabel

=== Liga Provincial de Barranca ===
==== List of champions ====
Season	Champion	Runner-up
1985	Unión Supe	
1992	Deportivo Potao	
1996	Unión Supe	
2007	Deportivo Potao	
2008	Unión Galpón	Araya Grande
2009	AIPSA	Social San Nicolás
2010	AIPSA	Alianza Aurora
2011	Juventud Santa Ana	AIPSA
2012	Juventud Santa Ana	Unión Galpón
2013	AIPSA	Racing
2014	Independiente Cerro Blanco	Nícida & Víctor
2015	Deportivo Cosmos	Alianza Aurora
2016	AIPSA	Alianza Aurora
2017	Defensor San Nicolás	Deportivo Potao
2018	Mariscal Santa Cruz	Defensor Chanana
2019	Deportivo Cosmos	Estrella Roja
2020	Canceled due to the COVID-19 pandemic	
2021	Canceled due to the COVID-19 pandemic	
2022	Unión Supe	Miguel Grau
2023	Nueva Generación	AIPSA
2024	Juventud Huracán	Juventud Puente Bolívar
2025	Juventud Huracán	Unión Supe
2026	AIPSA	Deportivo Potao

=== Liga Provincial de Cañete ===
==== List of champions ====
Season	Champion	Runner-up
2006	Independiente	
2007	Independiente	Unión Cañete
2008	Matices Ciclo	La Esmeralda
2009	Independiente	Deportivo Scratch
2010	Delfines Tiburones	Bella Esperanza
2011	San Lorenzo de Porococha	Estudiantes Condestable
2012	Walter Ormeño	San Lorenzo de Porococha
2013	San Lorenzo de Porococha	Independiente
2014	Juventud América	Atlético Real Mala
2015	Juventud América	Atlético Chalaco
2016	Independiente	Social La Florida
2017	San Lorenzo de Porococha	Independiente
2018	Walter Ormeño	Independiente
2019	Walter Ormeño	San Lorenzo de Porococha
2020	Canceled due to the COVID-19 pandemic	
2021	Canceled due to the COVID-19 pandemic	
2022	Walter Ormeño	Deportivo Casa Blanca
2023	Walter Ormeño	San Lorenzo de Porococha
2024	Bella Esperanza	Unión Bujama
2025	Bella Esperanza	Independiente
2026	Bella Esperanza	Defensor Santa Teresa

=== Liga Provincial de Canta ===
==== List of champions ====
Season	Champion	Runner-up
2008	Relámpago Huanchipuquio	Unión Zapán
2009	San Antonio de Trapiche	Unión Zapán
2010	Deportivo Huracán	San Antonio de Trapiche
2011	Los Tres Unidos	Deportivo Huracán
2012	Deportivo Huracán	
2013	San Antonio de Trapiche	Unión Zapán
2014	Deportivo Huracán	Unión Zapán
2015	Los Ángeles Negros	Deportivo Huracán
2016	Juventud Chocas	Santa Rosa de Macas
2017	Los Ángeles Negros	Santa Rosa de Macas
2018	Los Ángeles Negros	Deportivo Huracán
2019	Los Ángeles Negros	Santa Rosa de Macas
2020	Canceled due to the COVID-19 pandemic	
2021	Canceled due to the COVID-19 pandemic	
2022	Sport Olivar	Unión Santa Rosa
2023	Deportivo Huracán	Los Ángeles Negros
2024	San Antonio de Trapiche	Juventud Chocas
2025	Unión Sport Morales	Salvador Cullhuay
2026	Relámpago Huanchipuquio	Deportivo Huracán

=== Liga Provincial de Huaral ===
==== List of champions ====
Season	Champion	Runner-up
2008	Deportivo Palpa	Benjamín Vizquerra
2009	Unión Huaral	Norte Peralvillo
2010	Santa Rosa La Quincha	Juventud Chancay
2011	Unión Huaral	Alianza Las Salinas
2012	Unión Huaral	Defensor Los Tilos
2013	Defensor Los Tilos	Unión Huaral
2014	Aurora Chancayllo	Defensor Los Tilos
2015	Defensor Laure Sur	Social La Huaca
2016	Juventud 2001 Chancayllo	Defensor Laure Sur
2017	Defensor Laure Sur	Social La Huaca
2018	Defensor Laure Sur	Norte Peralvillo
2019	Paz Soldán	Credicoop Huaral
2020	Canceled due to the COVID-19 pandemic	
2021	Canceled due to the COVID-19 pandemic	
2022	Paz Soldán	Juventud 2001 Chancayllo
2023	Sport Santa Rosa	Defensor Laure Sur
2024	Chacarita Caqui	Vasco da Gama
2025	ASA	Deportivo Palpa
2026	Juventud Naturales	Sport Santa Rosa

=== Liga Provincial de Huarochirí ===
==== List of champions ====
Season	Champion	Runner-up
2008	San Juan de Lanka	Unión Juventud Cocachacra
2009	Círculo Progresista	Agua Mineral
2010	Unión Juventud Cocachacra	River Plate de Canchacaya
2011	River Plate de Canchacaya	Santos Quispe
2012	River Plate de Canchacaya	Deportivo Amauta
2013	River Plate de Canchacaya	Manchester Tri
2014	Villa Unión	Deportivo 2000 Cumbe
2015	Deportivo 2000 Cumbe	AD Corcona
2016	Villa Unión	Flamengo
2017	Juventud Huaripache	Flamengo
2018	Villa Unión	Juventud Huaripache
2019	Juventud Huaripache	Alianza San Mateo
2020	Canceled due to the COVID-19 pandemic	
2021	Canceled due to the COVID-19 pandemic	
2022	San Antonio	Huarochirí FC
2023	Atlético Tingo María	Huarochirí FC
2024	Atlético Minero	Deportivo Oyotún
2025	Deportivo Oyotún	DIM Huarochirí
2026	San Juan Bosco	FC Cupiche

=== Liga Provincial de Huaura ===
==== List of champions ====
Season	Champion	Runner-up
2008	Juventud Barranco	Marcial Villanueva
2009	Unión Chorrillos	Juventud Barranco
2010	Juventud Barranco	Pedro Anselmo Bazalar
2011	Pedro Anselmo Bazalar	Venus
2012	Venus	Nicolás de Piérola
2013	Santa Rosa de Caldera	Venus
2014	Venus	Santa Rosa de Caldera
2015	Santa Rosa de Caldera	Venus
2016	Venus	José Gálvez
2017	Juventud Barranco	Social La Villa
2018	Venus	UNJFSC
2019	Maristas	Juventud Panana
2020	Canceled due to the COVID-19 pandemic	
2021	Canceled due to the COVID-19 pandemic	
2022	Tito Drago	José de San Martín
2023	Maristas	Juventud Cruz de Chonta
2024	Real Independiente	Juventud Cruz de Chonta
2025	Sport Andahuasi	Sport Humaya
2026	Sport Humaya	Nicolás de Piérola

== Loreto ==
=== Liga Provincial de Loreto ===
==== List of champions ====
Season	Champion	Runner-up
2009	Deportivo Belén	Deportivo Municipal (Nauta)
2010	Deportivo Belén	Sport Nauta
2011	Deportivo Municipal (Parinari)	
2012	Deportivo Municipal (Nauta)	
2013	Deportivo Municipal (Nauta)	
2014	Deportivo Municipal (Nauta)	
2015	Hércules FC	
2016	AD Zaragoza	
2017	Hércules FC	
2018	Defensor San Felipe	
2019	Renacer Tecnológico	
2020	Canceled due to the COVID-19 pandemic	
2021	Canceled due to the COVID-19 pandemic	
2022	Atlético Nauta	
2023	San Felipe	
2024	Renacer Tecnológico	Deportivo Municipal (Nauta)
2025	Deportivo Municipal (Nauta)	Renacer Tecnológico
2026	ACUDECANA	Athletic Municipal de Trompeteros

=== Liga Provincial de Maynas ===
==== List of champions ====
Season	Champion	Runner-up
2009	Los Tigres	UNAP
2010	Angamos Juventud Bellavista	Los Tigres
2011	Los Tigres	
2012	UNAP	
2013	Bolívar	
2014	CNI	
2015	Bolívar	
2016	Kola San Martín	Estudiantil CNI
2017	Estudiantil CNI	
2018	Comerciantes	UNAP
2019	Comerciantes	
2020	Canceled due to the COVID-19 pandemic	
2021	Canceled due to the COVID-19 pandemic	
2022	Estudiantil CNI	Comerciantes
2023	Estudiantil CNI	
2024	Estudiantil CNI	UNAP
2025	Nihue Rao	Shirmar FC
2026	Atlético Nacional de Iquitos	UNAP

== Madre de Dios ==
=== Liga Provincial de Manu ===
Season	Champion
2009	Deportivo Cordenap
2010	Juventus 12 de Enero
2011	Transporte Pukiri
2012	Juventus 12 de Enero
2013	Not awarded
2014	Not awarded
2015	Not awarded
2016	Mafer de Manu
2017	Juventus 12 de Enero
2018	Juventus 12 de Enero
2019	JM de Huepetuhe
2020	Canceled due to the COVID-19 pandemic
2021	Canceled due to the COVID-19 pandemic
2022	Atlético Junior Huepetuhe
2023	La Masía Nace
2024	AFC Caychihue
2025	La Masía Nace

=== Liga Provincial de Tahuamanu ===
Season	Champion
2009	Máximo Rodríguez
2010	Deportivo Monterrico
2011	Deportivo Municipal
2012	Deportivo Monterrico
2013	Deportivo Monterrico
2014	Deportivo Mototaxistas
2015	Deportivo Monterrico
2016	Deportivo Monterrico
2017	Deportivo Monterrico
2018	La Colonia
2019	La Colonia
2020	Canceled due to the COVID-19 pandemic
2021	Canceled due to the COVID-19 pandemic
2022	Atlético Municipal Iñapari
2023	Atlético Iberia
2024	No tournament
2025	No tournament

=== Liga Provincial de Tambopata ===
Season	Champion
2009	MINSA
2010	MINSA
2011	Deportivo Maldonado
2012	Fray Martín de Porres
2013	30 de Agosto
2014	MINSA
2015	MINSA
2016	MINSA
2017	Deportivo Maldonado
2018	MINSA
2019	Hospital Santa Rosa
2020	Canceled due to the COVID-19 pandemic
2021	Canceled due to the COVID-19 pandemic
2022	Athletico Maldonado
2023	Hospital Santa Rosa
2024	Alto Rendimiento
2025	ADEVIL

== Moquegua ==
=== Liga Provincial de Ilo ===
==== List of champions ====
Season	Champion	Runner-up
2009	Deportivo Enersur	Mariscal Nieto
2010	Mariscal Nieto	Rodillo Negro
2011	Social EPISA	Deportivo Enersur
2012	José Gálvez	Juventus Ilo
2013	Deportivo Enersur	Mariscal Nieto
2014	Mariscal Nieto	Deportivo Enersur
2015	Deportivo Enersur	Social Chalaca
2016	Mariscal Nieto	Deportivo Enersur
2017	ADUCI	Mariscal Nieto
2018	Mariscal Nieto	Hijos del Altiplano y del Pacífico
2019	Mariscal Nieto	ADEBA
2020	Canceled due to the COVID-19 pandemic	
2021	Canceled due to the COVID-19 pandemic	
2022	Mariscal Nieto	Hijos del Altiplano y del Pacífico
2023	Hijos del Altiplano y del Pacífico	Mariscal Nieto
2024	Hijos del Altiplano y del Pacífico	Pumas
2025	Hijos del Altiplano y del Pacífico	ADEBA
2026	Mariscal Nieto	Deportivo Enersur

=== Liga Provincial de Mariscal Nieto ===
==== List of champions ====
Season	Champion	Runner-up
2009	Atlético Huracán	
2010	Atlético Huracán	Academia Ticsani
2011	San Simón	Atlético Huracán
2012	San Simón	Deportivo Vallecito
2013	Estudiantes Alas Peruanas	San Simón
2014	Flamengo	Atlético Huracán
2015	Atlético Huracán	Francisco Fahlman
2016	Atlético Huracán	Francisco Fahlman
2017	Atlético Huracán	Credicoop San Cristóbal
2018	Credicoop San Cristóbal	Atlético Huracán
2019	Juvenil Quele	Juventud Cobresol
2020	Canceled due to the COVID-19 pandemic	
2021	Canceled due to the COVID-19 pandemic	
2022	Academia Ticsani	Juvenil Quele
2023	UCV Moquegua	Barrio 12
2024	Real San Antonio	Academia Ticsani
2025	Barrio 12	UCV Moquegua
2026	Atlético Huracán	Liberty School College

== Pasco ==
=== Liga Provincial de Daniel Alcídes Carrión ===
Season	Champion
2009	Santa Ana
2010	Unión Minas
2011	Deportivo Municipal (Yanahuanca)
2012	Santa Ana
2013	Real Santiago Allauca
2014	Real Santiago Allauca
2015	Deportivo Municipal (Yanahuanca)
2016	Deportivo Municipal (Yanahuanca)
2017	Deportivo Municipal (Yanahuanca)
2018	Deportivo Municipal (Yanahuanca)
2019	Deportivo Municipal (Yanahuanca)
2020	Canceled due to the COVID-19 pandemic
2021	Canceled due to the COVID-19 pandemic
2022	Deportivo Municipal (Yanahuanca)
2023	Juventud Municipal
2024	San Juan de Yanacocha
2025	UDY
2026	Deportivo Municipal (Santa Ana)

=== Liga Provincial de Oxapampa ===
Season	Champion
2009	Unión Palomar
2010	UNDAC FBC
2011	Zona Industrial
2012	Zona Industrial
2013	Social Constitución
2014	Zona Industrial
2015	Deportivo Municipal (Oxapampa)
2016	Deportivo Municipal (Oxapampa)
2017	Social Constitución
2018	Zona Industrial
2019	AD Tecnológica
2020	Canceled due to the COVID-19 pandemic
2021	Canceled due to the COVID-19 pandemic
2022	Social Constitución
2023	Academia Pepe
2024	Pedro Ruiz Gallo
2025	Deportivo Municipal (Oxapampa)
2026	Academia Pepe

=== Liga Provincial de Pasco ===
Season	Champion
2009	Sport Ticlacayán
2010	UNDAC
2011	UNDAC
2012	Rancas
2013	Rancas
2014	Ecosem
2015	Sociedad Tiro 28
2016	Sport Ticlacayán
2017	Milenium
2018	San Agustín
2019	Juventud Municipal
2020	Canceled due to the COVID-19 pandemic
2021	Canceled due to the COVID-19 pandemic
2022	Once Caldas
2023	Columna Pasco
2024	Sociedad Tiro 28
2025	Tecnomin
2026	Sociedad Tiro 28

== Piura ==
=== Liga Provincial de Ayabaca ===
Season	Champion
2009	Sport Acubas
2010	Defensor Ayabaca
2011	Rosario Central
2012	Rosario Central
2013	Lizardo Montero
2014	Sport Fátima
2015	Not awarded
2016	Lizardo Montero
2017	Lizardo Montero
2018	Not awarded
2019	Not awarded
2020	Canceled due to the COVID-19 pandemic
2021	Canceled due to the COVID-19 pandemic
2022	Sport Fátima
2023	Sport Yanayacu
2024	Los Tigres
2025	No tournament
2026	Real FC

=== Liga Provincial de Huancabamba ===
Season	Champion
2009	Alianza Villanueva
2010	Alianza Villanueva
2011	Unión La Soccha
2012	Deportivo Municipal (H)
2013	Real Castilla
2014	San Francisco
2015	Ciclón del Alto
2016	Deportivo Municipal (H)
2017	Alianza Villa Nueva
2018	Ramón Castilla
2019	Atlético Chalaco
2020	Canceled due to the COVID-19 pandemic
2021	Canceled due to the COVID-19 pandemic
2022	Ramón Castilla
2023	Ramón Castilla
2024	Juventud Cautivo
2025	Jibaja Che
2026	Jibaja Che

=== Liga Provincial de Morropón ===
Season	Champion
2009	Juan Aurich
2010	Defensor Monteverde
2011	Sport Ayacucho
2012	Defensor Grau
2013	Juan Aurich
2014	Asociación Comerciantes
2015	Defensor El Ingenio
2016	Sport Ayacucho
2017	Deportivo Monteverde
2018	Defensor El Ingenio
2019	Juan Aurich
2020	Canceled due to the COVID-19 pandemic
2021	Canceled due to the COVID-19 pandemic
2022	Nueva Juventud
2023	Halcones de Huaquilla
2024	Caysa Yapatera
2025	Estudiantes de Pueblo Nuevo
2026	Juan Aurich Pedregal

=== Liga Provincial de Paita ===
Season	Champion
2009	Cultural Progreso
2010	Unión Deportivo Tablazo
2011	José Olaya
2012	Unión Deportiva Paita
2013	Olger Jara
2014	Cultural Paita
2015	Cultural Paita
2016	Sport Estrella
2017	Sport Estrella
2018	Alfonso Ugarte
2019	Juan Noel
2020	Canceled due to the COVID-19 pandemic
2021	Canceled due to the COVID-19 pandemic
2022	Juan Noel
2023	Juan Noel
2024	Unión Viviate
2025	Defensor Belis
2026	San Martín de Occidente

=== Liga Provincial de Piura ===
Season	Champion	Runner-up
2002	Atlético Grau	Olimpia
2003	Atlético Grau	Olimpia
2004	Alianza Vallejina	Olimpia
2005	Olimpia	Atlético Grau
2006	Corazón Micaelino	Olimpia
2007	Atlético Grau	Corazón Micaelino
2008	Atlético Grau	Olimpia
2009	Inca Junior	Ignacio Merino
2010	Salesianos	Ignacio Merino
2011	Juan de Mori	Inca Junior
2012	Inca Junior	Flamengo (Castilla)
2013	Defensor Bolognesi	Flamengo (Castilla)
2014	Escuela Piuranitos	Sport Liberal
2015	UNP	San Antonio
2016	UNP	Defensor Bolognesi
2017	UNP	Atlético Grau
2018	Ídolos	Defensor Nuevo Catacaos
2019	Ídolos	Semillero Tambogrande
2020	Canceled due to the COVID-19 pandemic	
2021	Canceled due to the COVID-19 pandemic	
2022	Defensor Nuevo Catacaos	Semillero Tambogrande
2023	Olimpia	Nueva Juventud Santa Rosa
2024	Racing (Tambogrande)	Porvenir Huáscar
2025	Racing (Tambogrande)	Olimpia
2026	Sport Loma Negra	Águila Roja

=== Liga Provincial de Sechura ===
Season	Champion
2009	Deportivo Municipal (Vice)
2010	Deportivo Municipal (Vice)
2011	José Olaya
2012	Rueda Dominicana
2013	Defensor La Bocana
2014	Defensor La Bocana
2015	UDP
2016	UDP
2017	UDP
2018	UDP
2019	Defensor La Bocana
2020	Canceled due to the COVID-19 pandemic
2021	Canceled due to the COVID-19 pandemic
2022	Defensor La Bocana
2023	Deportivo Municipal (Vice)
2024	Deportivo Municipal (Vice)
2025	Estudiantes de Chancay
2026	Alfonso Ugarte (Vice)

=== Liga Provincial de Sullana ===
Season	Champion
2009	Juventud Bellavista
2010	UD Samán
2011	UD Salitral
2012	Sport Bellavista
2013	San Martín
2014	Sport Chorrillos
2015	Estrella Roja
2016	San Martín
2017	Sport Chorrillos
2018	Berlín
2019	Sport Chorrillos
2020	Canceled due to the COVID-19 pandemic
2021	Canceled due to the COVID-19 pandemic
2022	No tournament
2023	Juventud Bellavista
2024	UD Salitral
2025	Defensor San Miguel
2026	Estrella Roja

=== Liga Provincial de Talara ===
Season	Champion
2009	Independiente
2010	Sport Nicaragua
2011	Atlético Torino Nueva Generación
2012	Independiente
2013	Independiente
2014	Cristo Rey
2015	Sport Chorrillos (Máncora)
2016	Independiente
2017	Independiente
2018	Asociación Torino
2019	Asociación Torino
2020	Canceled due to the COVID-19 pandemic
2021	Canceled due to the COVID-19 pandemic
2022	Sport Chorrillos
2023	Atlético Torino
2024	Atlético Torino
2025	Atlético Torino
2026	Atlético Torino

== Puno ==
=== Liga Provincial de Azángaro ===
Season	Champion
2011	Huracán San Francisco
2012	ADESA
2013	Deportivo Municipal (Muñani)
2014	Independiente JDC
2015	Atlético San Fernando
2016	Independiente JDC
2017	Defensor Rico Tacna
2018	UDE Los Próceres
2019	Atlético Municipal
2020	Canceled due to the COVID-19 pandemic
2021	Canceled due to the COVID-19 pandemic
2022	UDE Los Próceres
2023	UDE Los Próceres
2024	Unión Soratira
2025	San Martín de Chupa

=== Liga Provincial de Carabaya ===
Season	Champion
2011	Unión Bolognesi
2012	Deportivo Municipal (Ajoyani)
2013	Deportivo Municipal (Ituata)
2014	Deportivo Municipal (Macusani)
2015	Deportivo Municipal (Macusani)
2016	Unión Municipal Usicayos
2017	SIEN Carabaya
2018	José Macedo Mendoza
2019	Deportivo Municipal (Macusani)
2020	Canceled due to the COVID-19 pandemic
2021	Canceled due to the COVID-19 pandemic
2022	Unión Progresista
2023	River Play
2024	Cultural Tambillo
2025	San Martín de Tours

=== Liga Provincial de Chucuito ===
Season	Champion
2011	Hunter Boys
2012	Cultural Tahuantinsuyo
2013	Binacional
2014	Binacional
2015	Binacional
2016	Pedro Ruiz Gallo
2017	Alianza Thiri
2018	No tournament
2019	No tournament
2020	Canceled due to the COVID-19 pandemic
2021	Canceled due to the COVID-19 pandemic
2022	No tournament
2023	No tournament
2024	Deportivo Municipal (Desaguadero)
2025	No tournament

=== Liga Provincial de El Collao ===
Season	Champion
2011	Universidad Andina Ilave
2012	Real Amistad
2013	Melgar Suyo
2014	Alianza Ilave
2015	San Sebatián
2016	Sport Munich
2017	Sport Collao
2018	Sport Collao
2019	No tournament
2020	Canceled due to the COVID-19 pandemic
2021	Canceled due to the COVID-19 pandemic
2022	No tournament
2023	No tournament
2024	No tournament
2025	No tournament

=== Liga Provincial de Huancané ===
Season	Champion
2011	León de San Isidro
2012	Cultural Unión Cojata
2013	No tournament
2014	Defensor Huancané
2015	Defensor Huancané
2016	Ciclón Azangarillo
2017	Defensor Huancané
2018	No tournament
2019	Deportivo Municipal (Ramis Taraco)
2020	Canceled due to the COVID-19 pandemic
2021	Canceled due to the COVID-19 pandemic
2022	FC Sacasco
2023	Unión Platense
2024	Unión Dínamo
2025	No tournament

=== Liga Provincial de Lampa ===
Season	Champion
2011	Defensor Tumi Grande
2012	Tupac Amaru
2013	Antenor Escudero
2014	Real Miraflores
2015	Leal Villa
2016	Atlético Miraflores
2017	Perusia FBC
2018	Real Miraflores
2019	Sport Stronger Cabanilla
2020	Canceled due to the COVID-19 pandemic
2021	Canceled due to the COVID-19 pandemic
2022	Unión Ángeles de Vizcachani
2023	Unión Ángeles de Vizcachani
2024	Unión Ángeles de Vizcachani
2025	Unión Ángeles de Vizcachani

=== Liga Provincial de Melgar ===
Season	Champion
2011	Empresa Comunal de Macari
2012	Deportivo Municipal (Umachiri)
2013	Deportivo Municipal (Texas de Nuñoa)
2014	FBC Municipal (Llalli)
2015	FBC Municipal (Orurillo)
2016	Deportivo Municipal (Santa Rosa)
2017	Escuela Municipal (Ayaviri)
2018	Escuela Municipal
2019	Deportivo Municipal (Santa Rosa)
2020	Canceled due to the COVID-19 pandemic
2021	Canceled due to the COVID-19 pandemic
2022	Deportivo Municipal (Santa Rosa)
2023	Deportivo Municipal (Texas de Nuñoa)
2024	Cebollitas Macarí
2025	Alfonso Ugarte (Huamanruro)

=== Liga Provincial de Moho ===
Season	Champion
2011	Alianza Moho
2012	Alianza Moho
2013	Alianza Moho
2014	Alianza Moho
2015	Deportivo Municipal (Moho)
2016	Deportivo Municipal (Moho)
2017	Deportivo Municipal (Moho)
2018	No tournament
2019	No tournament
2020	Canceled due to the COVID-19 pandemic
2021	Canceled due to the COVID-19 pandemic
2022	No tournament
2023	No tournament
2024	No tournament

=== Liga Provincial de Puno ===
Season	Champion
2009	Estudiantes Puno
2010	Deportivo Universitario
2011	Estudiantes Puno
2012	Policial Santa Rosa
2013	Deportivo Universitario
2014	Policial Santa Rosa
2015	Deportivo Universitario
2016	Policial Santa Rosa
2017	Estudiantes Puno
2018	Alfonso Ugarte
2019	Alfonso Ugarte
2020	Canceled due to the COVID-19 pandemic
2021	Canceled due to the COVID-19 pandemic
2022	Deportivo Universitario
2023	Deportivo Universitario
2024	Defensor Carata
2025	Atlético Alfonso Ugarte
2026	San José de Llungo

=== Liga Provincial de San Antonio de Putina ===
Season	Champion
2011	Los Andes de Ananea
2012	Deportivo Municipal (Putina)
2013	Unión Fuerza Minera
2014	Unión Fuerza Minera
2015	Unión Fuerza Minera
2016	Unión Fuerza Minera
2017	Unión Fuerza Minera
2018	Unión Fuerza Minera
2019	Unión Fuerza Minera
2020	Canceled due to the COVID-19 pandemic
2021	Canceled due to the COVID-19 pandemic
2022	Unión Fuerza Minera
2023	Minera Los Andes
2024	Minera Los Andes
2025	Cristo Rey Quilcapunco

=== Liga Provincial de Sandia ===
Season	Champion
2011	Juventus Oriental
2012	Deportivo Municipal (San Juan del Oro)
2013	Deportivo Municipal (Putina Punco)
2014	Juventus Oriental
2015	Deportivo Municipal (Sandia)
2016	Deportivo Municipal (Putina Punco)
2017	Defensor Sandia
2018	Deportivo Municipal (San Juan del Oro)
2019	Santiago Quebrada
2020	Canceled due to the COVID-19 pandemic
2021	Canceled due to the COVID-19 pandemic
2022	Deportivo Municipal (Sandia)
2023	Real Unión (Cuyocuyo)
2024	Peñón de Oro
2025	Deportivo Municipal (Sandia)

=== Liga Provincial de San Román ===
Season	Champion
2009	ADEVIL
2010	Defensor Politécnico
2011	Junior de la UANCV
2012	ADEVIL
2013	Junior de la UANCV
2014	Junior de la UANCV
2015	Diablos Rojos
2016	Diablos Rojos
2017	Credicoop San Román
2018	Credicoop San Román
2019	Credicoop San Román
2020	Canceled due to the COVID-19 pandemic
2021	Canceled due to the COVID-19 pandemic
2022	Cahusiños San Miguel
2023	Sport Aurora
2024	ANBA Perú
2025	ANBA Perú
2026	CEFUT Juliaca

=== Liga Provincial de Yunguyo ===
Season	Champion
2011	José Gálvez
2012	Sporting Cristal
2013	No tournament
2014	Alianza Porvenir
2015	Independiente Kasani
2016	Alianza Porvenir
2017	Alianza Porvenir
2018	No tournament
2019	Alianza Porvenir
2020	Canceled due to the COVID-19 pandemic
2021	Canceled due to the COVID-19 pandemic
2022	No tournament
2023	No tournament
2024	Magisterio Ilave
2025	No tournament

== San Martín ==
=== Liga Provincial de Bellavista ===
Season	Champion
2009	Deportivo Limón
2010	Cultural San Rafael
2011	Nacional de Tingo de Sapo
2012	Héctor Chumpitaz
2013	Defensor Tingo
2014	Deportivo Limón
2015	Héctor Chumpitaz
2016	Bellavista
2017	Bellavista
2018	Bellavista
2019	Bellavista
2020	Canceled due to the COVID-19 pandemic
2021	Canceled due to the COVID-19 pandemic
2022	Unión Cuzco
2023	Academia CIMAC
2024	Biavo FC
2025	Huallaga Ledoy
2026	Unión Cuzco

=== Liga Provincial de El Dorado ===
Season	Champion
2009	Defensor Huaja
2010	Sub 20 de Shatoja
2011	Sargento Lores
2012	Asociación de Madereros
2013	Defensor San José
2014	Real San José
2015	Kawana Sisa
2016	San José de Agua Blanca
2017	San José de Agua Blanca
2018	Unión Huancabamba
2019	El Dorado
2020	Canceled due to the COVID-19 pandemic
2021	Canceled due to the COVID-19 pandemic
2022	El Dorado
2023	Kawana Sisa
2024	Real Ishichihui
2025	Real Ishichihui
2026	Sport Huaja

=== Liga Provincial de Huallaga ===
Season	Champion
2009	Unión Saposoa
2010	Oriental Sporting
2011	Huallaga
2012	Rafael Ríos Ruíz
2013	Unión Nacional
2014	Huallaga
2015	Deportivo Municipal (Pasarraya)
2016	Deportivo Municipal (Pasarraya)
2017	Saposoa
2018	Sargento Lores
2019	Yacusisa
2020	Canceled due to the COVID-19 pandemic
2021	Canceled due to the COVID-19 pandemic
2022	Agua San Martín
2023	Cañabrava
2024	Cantorcillo FC
2025	Oriental Sporting
2026	Oriental Sporting

=== Liga Provincial de Lamas ===
Season	Champion
2009	Defensor Churuzapa
2010	Alianza Cuñumbuque
2011	Deportivo Ancohallo
2012	Deportivo Quilluallpa
2013	Luis Gómez
2014	Leoncio Prado
2015	San José de Cuñumbuqui
2016	Hugo Hausewell
2017	Kechwas Lamistas
2018	Kechwas Lamistas
2019	Zaragoza
2020	Canceled due to the COVID-19 pandemic
2021	Canceled due to the COVID-19 pandemic
2022	Atlético Deportivo Tabalosos
2023	Kechwas Lamistas
2024	Real Nativos
2025	Shanao FC
2026	Unión Pamashto

=== Liga Provincial de Mariscal Cáceres ===
Season	Champion
2009	Deportivo Comercio
2010	Defensores La Merced
2011	Integración Magisterial
2012	Integración Magisterial
2013	Deportivo Cayena
2014	Atlético Nacional
2015	Cultural Cayena
2016	Defensor Shumanza
2017	Deportivo Comercio
2018	Defensor Shumanza
2019	Sport Loreto
2020	Canceled due to the COVID-19 pandemic
2021	Canceled due to the COVID-19 pandemic
2022	San Martín Pajarillo
2023	Cahuide
2024	Deportivo Comercio
2025	Defensor Víveres
2026	Defensor Víveres

=== Liga Provincial de Moyobamba ===
Season	Champion
2009	Atlético Belén
2010	San Juan
2011	San Juan
2012	Deportivo Hospital
2013	Walter Chávez
2014	Sport Soritor
2015	Constructora Trujillo
2016	Constructora Trujillo
2017	Academia Fortal
2018	Pesquero FC
2019	ADT Tahuishco
2020	Canceled due to the COVID-19 pandemic
2021	Canceled due to the COVID-19 pandemic
2022	Estudiantes de Ingeniería
2023	ADT Tahuishco
2024	Emilio San Martín
2025	ADT Tahuishco
2026	Alto Mayo

=== Liga Provincial de Picota ===
Season	Champion
2009	Atlético Caspizapa
2010	Unión Picota
2011	FC Picota
2012	Power Maíz
2013	Deportivo Municipal (Picota)
2014	Ciro Vargas
2015	Unión Minas (Tres Unidos)
2016	Deportivo Cosmos
2017	José Carlos Mariátegui
2018	Sport Agraria
2019	Cultural Minas
2020	Canceled due to the COVID-19 pandemic
2021	Canceled due to the COVID-19 pandemic
2022	Inter Winge
2023	Unión Picota
2024	Power Club
2025	Alianza Tres Unidos
2026	AF Barcelona

=== Liga Provincial de Rioja ===
Season	Champion
2009	Nueva Rioja
2010	Unión Comercio
2011	Nueva Rioja
2012	Sport Alto Mayo
2013	Olímpico
2014	Olímpico
2015	Nueva Rioja
2016	Asociación Agrícola
2017	Deportivo Ucrania
2018	Deportivo Ucrania
2019	Nuevo Café Alto Mayo
2020	Canceled due to the COVID-19 pandemic
2021	Canceled due to the COVID-19 pandemic
2022	Atlético Awajun
2023	Unión Alto Mayo
2024	Deportivo Ucrania
2025	Juvenil Naranjos
2026	Deportivo Rivata

=== Liga Provincial de San Martín ===
Season	Champion
2009	Unión Tarapoto
2010	Unión César Vallejo
2011	Sport San Juan
2012	UNSM
2013	Deportivo Cali
2014	Deportivo Cali
2015	Unión Tarapoto
2016	Unión César Vallejo
2017	Santa Rosa
2018	Unión Tarapoto
2019	Deportivo Tumi
2020	Canceled due to the COVID-19 pandemic
2021	Canceled due to the COVID-19 pandemic
2022	Shuta Boys
2023	Unión Tarapoto
2024	Unión Tarapoto
2025	Grandez
2026	Oriente Tarapoto

== Tacna ==
=== Liga Provincial de Candarave ===
==== List of champions ====
Season	Champion	Runner-up
2009	Unión Ancocala	
2010	Social Santa Cruz	Defensor Talaca
2011	Sport Nevados	Social Santa Cruz
2012	Deportivo Curibaya	25 de Julio
2013	4 de Diciembre	Social Santa Cruz
2014	Social Santa Cruz	Atlético San Pedro
2015	Atlético San Pedro	
2016	Social Santa Cruz	Atlético San Pedro
2017	Unión Totora	Juventud Alba Roja
2018	Municipal Patapatani	Social Santa Cruz
2019	Social Santa Cruz	Juventud Alba Roja
2020	Canceled due to the COVID-19 pandemic	
2021	Canceled due to the COVID-19 pandemic	
2022	Social Santa Cruz	Juventud Alba Roja
2023	Juventud Alba Roja	Virgen de las Nieves
2024	Virgen de las Nieves	Real Miraflores
2025	San Agustín de Huanuara	
2026	Social Santa Cruz	Unión Totora

=== Liga Provincial de Jorge Basadre ===
==== List of champions ====
Season	Champion	Runner-up
2009	Unión Mirave	
2010	Unión Mirave	Juventud Cambaya
2011	Juventud Locumba	Defensor San Isidro
2012	Deportivo Borogueña	Unión Mirave
2013	Juventud Locumba	Deportivo Ticapampa
2014	Deportivo Municipal (Locumba)	Cooperativa ITE
2015	Sport Junior	
2016	Unión Mirave	Defensor San Isidro
2017	Juventud Locumba	
2018	Juventud Locumba	Unión Mirave
2019	Unión Mirave	Juventud Locumba
2020	Canceled due to the COVID-19 pandemic	
2021	Canceled due to the COVID-19 pandemic	
2022	Unión Mirave	Juventud Locumba
2023	Defensor Real Caleta	Defensor San Isidro
2024	Deportivo Municipal (Locumba)	Cooperativa ITE
2025	Dínamo de Solabaya	Deportivo Municipal (Locumba)
2026	Dínamo de Solabaya	Deportivo Municipal (Locumba)

=== Liga Provincial de Tacna ===
==== List of champions ====
Season	Champion	Runner-up
2008	Coronel Bolognesi	
2009	Mariscal Miller	
2010	River Plate (Pocollay)	Deportivo Inclán
2011	Mariscal Miller	Mariscal Cáceres
2012	Deportivo Credicoop	Bolognesi Zepita
2013	Coronel Bolognesi	Mariscal Cáceres
2014	Deportivo Credicoop	Coronel Bolognesi
2015	Coronel Bolognesi	Mariscal Miller
2016	Coronel Bolognesi	Bentín Tacna Heroica
2017	Coronel Bolognesi	Mariscal Miller
2018	Unión Alfonso Ugarte	Mariscal Miller
2019	Orión	Coronel Bolognesi
2020	Canceled due to the COVID-19 pandemic	
2021	Canceled due to the COVID-19 pandemic	
2022	Virgen de la Natividad	Coronel Bolognesi
2023	Bentín Tacna Heroica	Defensor Tacna
2024	Bentín Tacna Heroica	Patriotas
2025	Real Sociedad	Orcas AVT
2026	Virgen de la Natividad	Vendaval Azul

=== Liga Provincial de Tarata ===
==== List of champions ====
Season	Champion	Runner-up
2009	Atlético Yabroco	
2010	Águilas Melgar	Juventud Rosario (Pistala)
2011	Micro Región Tarata	Independiente Susapaya
2012	Defensor Tarata	Águila Melgar
2013	General Salaverry	Águila Melgar
2014	Sporting Centauro	Águilas Melgar
2015	Tigres de Ticaco	
2016	Águilas Melgar	Tigres de Ticaco
2017	Defensor Ticaco	
2018	Águilas Melgar	Real Miraflores
2019	Águilas Melgar	Estudiantil Copajino
2020	Canceled due to the COVID-19 pandemic	
2021	Canceled due to the COVID-19 pandemic	
2022	Águilas Melgar	Defensor Ticaco
2023	Águilas Melgar	Defensor Ticaco
2024	Sport Tarata	Sporting Centauro
2025	Sport Tarata	Unión Challaguaya
2026		

== Tumbes ==
=== Liga Provincial de Contralmirante Villar ===
==== List of champions ====
Season	Champion	Runner-up
2009	Barza	Nueva Esperanza
2010	José Peña Herrera	DINE
2011	José Peña Herrera	DINE
2012	Sport Bocapán	José Peña Herrera
2013	Cultural Libertad	Alianza Averías
2014	José Peña Herrera	Alianza Grau
2015	Sport Progresista	Alianza Averías
2016	Cultural Libertad	AD Punta Sal
2017	Barcelona de Acapulco	Ricardo Soto
2018	Barcelona de Acapulco	Cerro Porteño
2019	Alianza Zorritos	Amigos de Miramar
2020	Canceled due to the COVID-19 pandemic	
2021	Canceled due to the COVID-19 pandemic	
2022	Sport Progresista	Cerro Porteño
2023	Academia Quevedo	Boca Juniors (La Choza)
2024	UD Tacna Libre	Alianza Zorritos
2025	Barcelona de Acapulco	Independiente Zorritos
2026	Barcelona de Acapulco	Alianza Grau

=== Liga Provincial de Tumbes ===
==== List of champions ====
Season	Champion	Runner-up
2009	Defensor San José	Renovación Pacífico
2010	Alianza Triunfina	UNT
2011	Alejandro Villanueva	Teófilo Cubillas
2012	Sport San Martín	Académicos Alfred Nobel
2013	Atlético Tumbes	Sport San Martín
2014	Cristal Tumbes	Defensor Bolívar
2015	Defensor Progreso	Eduardo Ávalos
2016	Eduardo Ávalos	Independiente Carretas
2017	Renovación Cerro Blanco	Sport El Tablazo
2018	Estrella Roja	Defensor Progreso
2019	Renovación Cerro Blanco	Atlético Santa Rosa
2020	Canceled due to the COVID-19 pandemic	
2021	Canceled due to the COVID-19 pandemic	
2022	Leoncio Prado	Renovación Cerro Blanco
2023	Renovación Pacífico	Sport El Tablazo
2024	Leoncio Prado	Inca Junior
2025	UNT	Sport Pampas
2026	Sport El Tablazo	UNT

=== Liga Provincial de Zarumilla ===
==== List of champions ====
Season	Champion	Runner-up
2009	Comercial Aguas Verdes	28 de Julio
2010	Independiente Aguas Verdes	Halcones del Norte
2011	Sport Miraflores	José Chiroque Cielo
2012	Sport Bolognesi	24 de Julio
2013	UD Chulucanas	28 de Julio
2014	Sport Unión	Sport Municipal
2015	Sport Unión	Independiente
2016	Comercial Aguas Verdes	Los Chanos
2017	Sport Unión	Sport Zarumilla
2018	Deportivo Ferrocarril	Sport Bolognesi
2019	24 de Julio	Halcones del Norte
2020	Canceled due to the COVID-19 pandemic	
2021	Canceled due to the COVID-19 pandemic	
2022	Deportivo Ferrocarril	Sport Bolognesi
2023	Halcones del Norte	24 de Julio
2024	Sport Bolognesi	Sport Unión
2025	Sport Zarumilla	UD Chulucanas
2026	UD Chulucanas	Deportivo Pacífico

== Ucayali ==
=== Liga Provincial de Atalaya ===
==== List of champions ====
Season	Champion	Runner-up
2009	Deportivo Municipal (Atalaya)	Cultural Sepahua
2010	Deportivo Municipal (Atalaya)	SASA
2011	Deportivo Municipal (Atalaya)	Miguel Grau
2012	Defensor Bolognesi	Deportivo Municipal (Atalaya)
2013	Deportivo Hospital	Deportivo Municipal (Atalaya)
2014	Deportivo Municipal (Atalaya)	Deportivo Hospital
2015	Deportivo Municipal (Atalaya)	
2016	Deportivo Municipal (Atalaya)	San Juan
2017	Miguel Grau	
2018	Deportivo Municipal (Atalaya)	San Antonio de Padua
2019	Tecnológico	Estudiantil
2020	Canceled due to the COVID-19 pandemic	
2021	Canceled due to the COVID-19 pandemic	
2022	San Antonio de Padua	Atlético Raimondi
2023	Atlético Raimondi	Miguel Grau
2024	San Antonio de Padua	Nueva Italia
2025	Estudiantil Bolognesi	Deportivo Municipal (Sepahua)
2026	Deportivo Municipal (Atalaya)	Miguel Grau

=== Liga Provincial de Coronel Portillo ===
==== List of champions ====
Season	Champion	Runner-up
2009	Deportivo Bancos	Tecnológico
2010	Atlético Pucallpa	Deportivo Hospital
2011	Unión Miraflores	UNU
2012	Mariano Santos	Sport Loreto
2013	Deportivo Bancos	Sport Loreto
2014	Sport Loreto	Santa Rosa
2015	Deportivo Municipal (Callería)	
2016	UNU	Pucallpa FC
2017	Pucallpa FC	Comandante Alvariño
2018	UNU	Colegio Comercio
2019	Colegio Comercio	San Juan Bosco
2020	Canceled due to the COVID-19 pandemic	
2021	Canceled due to the COVID-19 pandemic	
2022	Colegio Comercio	Inter FC
2023	Nuevo Pucallpa	Inter FC
2024	Rauker	Colegio Comercio
2025	Colegio Comercio	Atlético Nacional
2026	La Peña de los Viernes	Deportivo Bancos

=== Liga Provincial de Padre Abad ===
==== List of champions ====
Season	Champion	Runner-up
2009	Sport Pilsen	
2010	Sport Boquerón	El Triunfo
2011	Defensor San Alejandro	Defensor Neshuya
2012	Fernando Carbajal	José Olaya
2013	Colegio Agropecuario	Independiente de Curimaná
2014	Deportivo Otorongo	Asociación de Cocaleros
2015	Deportivo Municipal (Aguaytía)	
2016	Defensor Neshuya	José Carlos Mariátegui
2017	Asociación de Cocaleros	Defensor San Alejandro
2018	Deportivo Municipal (Aguaytía)	El Triunfo
2019	Deportivo Municipal (Aguaytía)	El Triunfo
2020	Canceled due to the COVID-19 pandemic	
2021	Canceled due to the COVID-19 pandemic	
2022	Defensor San Alejandro	Asociación de Cocaleros
2023	Deportivo Shambillo	Asociación de Cocaleros
2024	Real Von Humboldt	Sporting Cristal (Aguaytía)
2025	Nuevo San Juan	Deportivo Shambillo
2026	Real Buenos Aires	Nuevo Satipo

=== Liga Provincial de Puerto Inca (Huánuco Province) ===
==== List of champions ====
Season	Champion	Runner-up
2009	Luis Benjamín Cisneros	
2010	Sport Andino	Dos de Mayo
2011	Luis Benjamín Cisneros	Señor de los Milagros
2012	Puerto 3 de Octubre	La Paz
2013	Puerto 3 de Octubre	Peñarol del Codo de Pozuzo
2014	Puerto Victoria	Luis Benjamín Cisneros
2015	Luis Benjamín Cisneros	
2016	Colegio Nacional Honoria	Escuela Municipal de Tournavista
2017	La Paz	
2018	Defensor El Codo	Escuela Municipal de Tournavista
2019	Escuela Municipal de Tournavista	Huracán (Puerto Inca)
2020	Canceled due to the COVID-19 pandemic	
2021	Canceled due to the COVID-19 pandemic	
2022	La Paz	Comerciantes Unidos
2023	Escuela Municipal de Tournavista	Huracán Inter
2024	Escuela Municipal de Tournavista	Huracán (Puerto Inca)
2025	Lanceros Verdes	Los Ángeles de San Antonio
2026	La Paz	Dos de Mayo
