= Unión Mirave =

Peruvian football club

- Full name: Club Deportivo Unión Mirave
- Founded: 1977
- Ground: Estadio Jorge Basadre, Tacna
- Capacity: 19,000
- Manager: Juan Carlos Nieto
- League: Copa Perú
Home colours

Club Deportivo Unión Mirave is a Peruvian football club, located in the city of Ilabaya, Tacna, Peru.

== History ==
Unión Mirave was founded in 1977. The club is one of the most popular teams of Tacna along with Coronel Bolognesi, Unión Alfonso Ugarte and Mariscal Miller.

In 2010 Copa Perú, the club qualified to Regional Stage, but was eliminated by FBC Aurora in the semifinals.

== Rivalries ==
Unión Mirave has had a long-standing rivalry with Unión Alfonso Ugarte and Mariscal Miller.

== Honours ==
=== Regional ===
- Liga Departamental de Tacna:

Runner-up (1): 2010

- Liga Provincial de Jorge Basadre:

Winners (5): 2009, 2010, 2016, 2019, 2022
Runner-up (3): 2012, 2017, 2018

== See also ==
- List of football clubs in Peru
- Peruvian football league system
