= 2002 Copa Perú =

Copa Perú
- Season: 2002
- Champions: Atlético Universidad

The 2002 Copa Perú season (Spanish: Copa Perú 2002), the promotion tournament of Peruvian football.

The tournament had five stages. The first four stages were played as mini-league round-robin tournaments, except for third stage in region IV, which was played as a knockout stage. The final stage featured two knockout rounds and a final four-team group stage to determine the two promoted teams.

This year twenty six teams qualified for the Etapa Regional (Regional Stage): these are the twenty six champions from each department (including two from Lima (the capital) - Perú was politically divided in twenty four Departments and one Constitutional Province.

All these teams were divided into eight groups by geographical proximity; then each winner qualified for the Etapa Nacional (National Stage). Those eight teams played, again by geographical proximity, home and away matches, in a knock-out tournament. The winner of the final was promoted to the First Division.

== Departmental Stage ==
The following list shows the teams that qualified for the Regional Stage.

Department	Team	Location
Amazonas	Sachapuyos	Chachapoyas
Ancash	José Gálvez	Chimbote
Apurímac	Deportivo Educación	Apurímac
Arequipa	Atlético Universidad	Arequipa
Ayacucho	San Francisco Santa María	Ayacucho
Cajamarca	UTC	Cajamarca
Callao	Atlético Chalaco	Callao
Cusco	Senati	Cusco
Huancavelica	UDA	Huancavelica
Huánuco	León de Huánuco	Huánuco
Ica	Santa Rita	Ica
Junín	Sport Dos de Mayo	Junín
La Libertad	Universidad César Vallejo	Trujillo

Departament	Team	Location
Lambayeque	Flamengo	Chiclayo
Lima	Juventud Torre Blanca	Chancay
Loreto	CNI	Iquitos
Madre de Dios	30 de Agosto	Madre de Dios
Moquegua	Mariscal Nieto	Ilo
Pasco	UNDAC	Pasco
Pasco	Unión Minas	Pasco
Piura	Atlético Grau	Piura
Puno	Franciscano San Román	Juliaca
San Martín	Atlético Belén	Moyobamba
Tacna	Bureau	Tacna
Tumbes	Independiente (Tumbes)	Tumbes
Ucayali	San Juan	Pucallpa

== Regional Stage ==
=== Region I ===
Region I included qualified teams from Amazonas, Lambayeque, Piura and Tumbes region.

==== Group A ====
Team 1	Agg.	Team 2	1st leg	2nd leg
Atlético Grau	4–2	Independiente (Tumbes)	3–1	1–1

==== Group B ====
Team 1	Agg.	Team 2	1st leg	2nd leg
Sachapuyos	3–5	Flamengo	1–2	2–3

==== Regional Final ====
Team 1	Agg.	Team 2	1st leg	2nd leg
Atlético Grau	3–1	Flamengo	1–1	2–0

=== Region II ===
Region II included qualified teams from Ancash, Cajamarca and La Libertad region.

Pos	Team	Pld	W	D	L	GF	GA	GD	Pts	Qualification	UCV	GAL	UTC
1	Universidad César Vallejo	4	2	2	0	5	3	+2	8	National stage		1–0	3–2
2	José Gálvez	4	2	1	1	4	2	+2	7		0–0		2–0
3	UTC	4	0	1	3	4	8	−4	1		1–1	1–2	

Legend: Blue = home team win; Yellow = draw; Red = away team win.

=== Region III ===
Region III included qualified teams from Loreto, San Martín and Ucayali region.

Pos	Team	Pld	W	D	L	GF	GA	GD	Pts	Qualification	CNI	SJP	BEL
1	CNI	4	3	1	0	7	0	+7	10	National stage		2–0	0–0
2	San Juan	4	1	1	2	3	6	−3	4		0–3		2–0
3	Atlético Belén	4	0	2	2	1	5	−4	2		0–2	1–1	

Legend: Blue = home team win; Yellow = draw; Red = away team win.

=== Region IV ===
Region IV includes qualified teams from Callao, Ica and Lima region.

Pos	Team	Pld	W	D	L	GF	GA	GD	Pts	Qualification	JVT	SRI	CHA
1	Juventud Torre Blanca	4	1	2	1	3	3	0	5	National stage		2–1	0–1
2	Santa Rita	4	1	2	1	3	3	0	5		1–1		1–0
3	Atlético Chalaco	4	1	2	1	1	1	0	5		0–0	0–0	

Legend: Blue = home team win; Yellow = draw; Red = away team win.

==== Tiebreaker ====
Team 1	Score	Team 2
Atlético Chalaco	2–1	Santa Rita
Juventud Torre Blanca	4–2	Atlético Chalaco

=== Region V ===
Region V included qualified teams from Huánuco, Junín and Pasco region.

Pos	Team	Pld	W	D	L	GF	GA	GD	Pts	Qualification	SDM	LEÓ	UND	UMI
1	Sport Dos de Mayo	6	5	0	1	14	5	+9	15			4–2	2–0	3–1
2	León de Huánuco	6	5	0	1	13	4	+9	15	National stage	1–0		2–0	4–0
3	UNDAC	5	0	1	4	2	10	−8	1		1–2	0–3		1–1
4	Unión Minas	5	0	1	4	2	12	−10	1		0–3	0–1	W.O.	

Legend: Blue = home team win; Yellow = draw; Red = away team win.

=== Region VI ===
Region VI includes qualified teams from Apurímac, Ayacucho and Huancavelica region.

Pos	Team	Pld	W	D	L	GF	GA	GD	Pts	Qualification	UDA	SFS	DPE
1	UDA	4	2	2	0	8	2	+6	8	National stage		3–0	3–0
2	San Francisco Santa María	4	1	1	2	3	5	−2	4		1–1		2–0
3	Deportivo Educación	4	1	1	2	2	6	−4	4		1–1	1–0	

Legend: Blue = home team win; Yellow = draw; Red = away team win.

=== Region VII ===
Region VII included qualified teams from Cusco, Madre de Dios and Puno region.

Pos	Team	Pld	W	D	L	GF	GA	GD	Pts	Qualification	SFC	FSR	30A
1	Senati	4	3	0	1	11	6	+5	9	National stage		1–0	4–0
2	Franciscano San Román	4	3	0	1	17	4	+13	9		3–2		7–1
3	30 de Agosto	4	0	0	4	4	22	−18	0		3–4	0–7	

Legend: Blue = home team win; Yellow = draw; Red = away team win.

==== Tiebreaker ====
Team 1	Score	Team 2
Senati	0–0 (4–3 p)	Franciscano San Román

=== Region VIII ===
Region VIII included qualified teams from Arequipa, Moquegua and Tacna region.

Pos	Team	Pld	W	D	L	GF	GA	GD	Pts	Qualification	AUN	BUR	MNI
1	Atlético Universidad	3	3	0	0	9	1	+8	9	National stage		4–1	4–0
2	Bureau	3	1	0	2	3	6	−3	3		0–1		2–1
3	Mariscal Nieto	2	0	0	2	1	6	−5	0		W.O.	W.O.	

Legend: Blue = home team win; Yellow = draw; Red = away team win.

== National Stage ==
The National Stage started in November. The winner of the National Stage was promoted to the 2003 Torneo Descentralizado. On every stage qualification is decided by points, no matter the goal difference. Third match played in neutral ground.

Quarterfinals
Atlético Grau	1	1	2
Universidad César Vallejo	0	1	1
Juventud Torre Blanca	0	0	0
CNI	1	2	3
UDA	2	1	3
León de Huánuco	3	1	4
Senati	1	1	2
Atlético Universidad	0	4	4

Semifinals
Atlético Grau	3	1	4
CNI	2	0	2
León de Huánuco	0	1	1
Atlético Universidad	1	2	3

Finals
Atlético Grau	1	2	3
Atlético Universidad	1	4	5

=== Quarterfinals ===
Team 1	Agg.	Team 2	1st leg	2nd leg
Atlético Grau	2–1	Universidad César Vallejo	1–0	1–1
Juventud Torre Blanca	0–3	CNI	0–1	0–2
León de Huánuco	4–3	UDA	3–2	1–1
Senati	0–3	Atlético Universidad	1–0	1–4

==== Tiebreaker ====
Team 1	Score	Team 2
Senati	2–3	Atlético Universidad

=== Semifinals ===
Team 1	Agg.	Team 2	1st leg	2nd leg
Atlético Grau	4–2	CNI	3–2	1–0
Atlético Universidad	3–1	León de Huánuco	1–0	2–1

=== Final ===
Team 1	Agg.	Team 2	1st leg	2nd leg
Atlético Universidad	5–3	Atlético Grau	1–1	4–2

== See also ==
- 2002 Torneo Descentralizado
- 2002 Peruvian Segunda División
