= Atlético Universidad =

- Full name: Club Atlético Universidad; Nacional San Agustín
- Nickname: "Los Granates"
- Founded: February 24, 1964
- Ground: Estadio Monumental UNSA, Arequipa
- Capacity: 45,000
- League: Copa Perú
Home colours	Away colours

Atlético Universidad was a Peruvian football club, playing in the city of Arequipa.

== History ==
The club was the 2002 Copa Perú champion, when it defeated Atlético Grau in the finals.

The club has played at the highest level of Peruvian football on three occasions, from the 2003 Torneo Descentralizado until the 2005 Torneo Descentralizado when it was relegated.

== Honours ==
=== National ===
- Copa Perú: 1

Winners (1): 2002

=== Regional ===
- Región VIII:

Winners (1): 2002
Runner-up (1): 2000, 2001

- Liga Departamental de Arequipa:

Winners (3): 2000, 2001, 2002
Runner-up (1): 1975

- Liga Provincial de Arequipa:

Winners (5): 1975, 2000, 2001, 2002, 2019
Runner-up (2): 1969, 2024

- Liga Distrital de Arequipa:

Winners (1): 2019
Runner-up (3): 2014, 2022, 2024

== See also ==
- List of football clubs in Peru
- Peruvian football league system
