= 2025 Liga 3 (Peru) =

Liga 3
- Season: 2025
- Dates: 25 April – 8 November 2025
- Champions: Sport Huancayo II (1st title)
- Promoted: Sport Huancayo II; Estudiantil CNI
- Relegated: Sport Bolognesi; Deportivo Municipal; Rauker; Diablos Rojos

The 2025 Liga 3 (known as the Liga 3 Joma 2025 for sponsorship reasons) was the 1st edition of the third tier of Federación Peruana de Futbol.

Sport Huancayo II won the final against Estudiantil CNI with a 3–2 aggregate score and earned promotion to the 2026 Liga 2.

== Format ==
The 2025 Liga 3 format was announced on 10 December, 2024. The tournament will feature three stages, the Regional Stage, Second Stage and the Play-Offs. In the Regional Stage, the 37 teams will be divided into four groups based on geographical location. The top four teams of these groups will advance to the Second Stage while the bottom placed teams will be relegated to the Copa Perú. In the Second Stage, 16 teams that advanced from the Regional Stage will be divided into four groups of four. The top two teams of each group will advance to the Play-Offs. The finalists will be promoted to the Liga 2.

== Teams ==
Initially, 36 teams were to take part in the league: the 25 best placed teams of each department in the national stage of the 2024 Copa Perú plus the 8 quarter-finalists of the 2024 Torneo de Promoción y Reserva and 3 relegated teams from the 2024 Liga 2. However, in October 2024, Deportivo Municipal suffered revocation of its Liga 2 license and was relegated to the Liga 3, increasing the number of teams in the Liga 3 from 36 to 37.

- Rauker was disqualified and relegated to the 2026 Copa Perú after accumulating two walkovers (Matchdays 2 and 3).

=== Team changes ===
Promoted from 2024 Copa Perú			Qualified from 2024 Torneo de Promoción y Reserva	Relegated from 2024 Liga 2
▲ Unión Santo Domingo (Amazonas 1) ▲ Centro Social Pariacoto (Áncash 1) ▲ Defensor José María Arguedas (Apurímac 1) ▲ Nacional (Arequipa 1) ▲ Nuevo San Cristóbal (Ayacucho 1) ▲ Cultural Volante (Cajamarca 1) ▲ Amazon Callao (Callao 1) ▲ Juventud Alfa (Cusco 1) ▲UDA (Huancavelica 1)	▲ Construcción Civil (Huánuco 1) ▲ Juventud Santo Domingo (Ica 1) ▲ Deportivo Municipal (Pangoa) (Junín 1) ▲ Juventus (La Libertad 1) ▲ Deportivo Lute (Lambayeque 1) ▲ Pacífico (Lima 1) ▲ Estudiantil CNI (Loreto 1) ▲ Alto Rendimiento (Madre de Dios 1)	▲ Real San Antonio (Moquegua 1) ▲ Ecosem Pasco (Pasco 1) ▲ Juventud Cautivo (Piura 1) ▲ Diablos Rojos (Puno 1) ▲ Deportivo Ucrania (San Martín 1) ▲ Patriotas (Tacna 1) ▲ Sport Bolognesi (Tumbes 1) ▲ Rauker (Ucayali 1)	▲ Universitario II (1st) ▲ Melgar II (2nd) ▲ Alianza Lima II (Semifinalist) ▲ADT II (Semifinalist) ▲ Cienciano II (Quarterfinalist) ▲ Sport Boys II (Quarterfinalist) ▲ Sport Huancayo II (Quarterfinalist) ▲ Universidad César Vallejo II (Quarterfinalist)	▼ Deportivo Municipal (12th, Retired) ▼ Carlos Stein (16th) ▼ Juan Aurich (Retired) ▼ Unión Huaral (Retired)

=== Stadia and locations ===
Locations of the 2025 Liga 3 teams
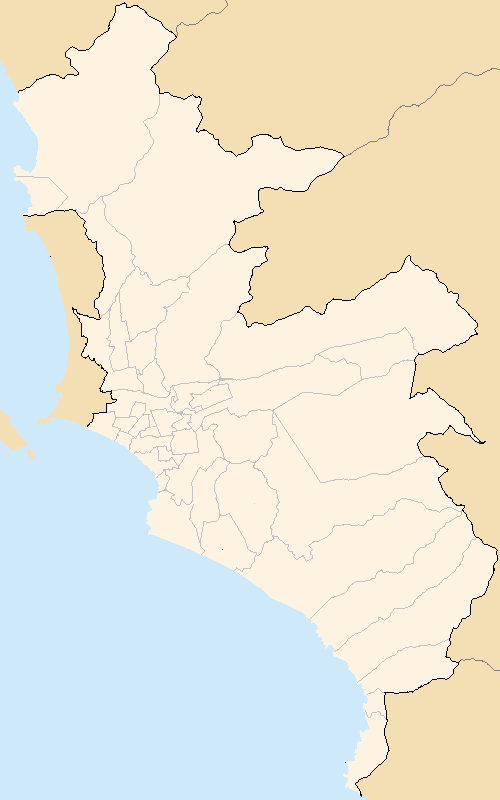
Locations of the 2025 Liga 3 teams in Lima
Locations of the 2025 Liga 3 teams in Callao

Team	City	Stadium	Capacity
ADT II	Tarma	Unión Tarma	9,100
Alianza Lima II	Lima	Hugo Sotil	13,773
Alto Rendimiento	Puerto Maldonado	IPD de Puerto Maldonado	2,000
Amazon Callao	Callao	Facundo Ramírez Aguilar	2,000
Carlos Stein	Lambayeque	César Flores Marigorda	7,000
Centro Social Pariacoto	Huaraz	Rosas Pampa	18,000
Cienciano II	Ocongate	Municipal de Ocongate	5,000
Construcción Civil	Huánuco	Heraclio Tapia	25,000
Cultural Volante	Bambamarca	Municipal El Frutillo	5,000
Defensor José María Arguedas	Andahuaylas	Municipal de Talavera	6,500
Deportivo Lute	Lambayeque	César Flores Marigorda	7,000
Deportivo Municipal	Lima	Municipal de Chorrillos	12,000
Deportivo Municipal (Pangoa)	Satipo	Municipal de Mazamari	5,000
Diablos Rojos	Juliaca	Guillermo Briceño Rosamedina	20,030
Deportivo Ucrania	Nueva Cajamarca	IPD de Nueva Cajamarca	12,000
Ecosem Pasco	Cerro de Pasco	Daniel Alcides Carrión	12,000
Estudiantil CNI	Iquitos	Max Augustín	24,576
Juan Aurich	Lambayeque	César Flores Marigorda	7,000
Juventud Alfa	Calca	Thomas Ernesto Payne	8,000
Juventud Cautivo	Sullana	Campeones del 36	12,000
Juventud Santo Domingo	Nasca	Municipal de Nasca	10,000
Juventus	Huamachuco	Municipal de Huamachuco	5,000
Melgar II	Arequipa	CAR - FBC Melgar	–
Nacional	Mollendo	Municipal de Mollendo	5,000
Nuevo San Cristóbal	Kimbiri	Municipal de Kimbiri	5,000
Pacífico	Huacho	Segundo Aranda Torres	11,500
Patriotas	Tacna	Jorge Basadre	19,850
Rauker	Pucallpa	Aliardo Soria Pérez	25,848
Real San Antonio	Moquegua	25 de Noviembre	21,073
Sport Bolognesi	Tumbes	Mariscal Cáceres	12,000
Sport Boys II	Callao	Campolo Alcalde	2,000
Sport Huancayo II	Huancayo	Huancayo	20,000
UDA	Huancavelica	IPD de Huancavelica	8,500
Unión Huaral	Huaral	Julio Lores Colán	6,000
Unión Santo Domingo	Chachapoyas	Gran Kuélap	1,000
Universidad César Vallejo II	Trujillo	César Acuña Peralta	2,000
Universitario II	Lima	Campo Mar - U	–

== Torneo Regional ==
=== Group 1 ===
Pos	Team	Pld	W	D	L	GF	GA	GD	Pts	Qualification	USD	JUV	CAU	LUT	AUR	UCV	VOL	STE	BOL
1	Unión Santo Domingo	16	10	2	4	32	19	+13	32	Advance to Second Stage		3–2	1–0	2–1	4–1	1–0	3–0	5–0	5–1
2	Juventus	16	9	2	5	36	22	+14	29	Advance to Second Stage	3–1		2–0	4–1	1–0	3–2	1–0	1–0	10–0
3	Juventud Cautivo	16	8	3	5	31	21	+10	27	Advance to Second Stage	3–2	4–2		3–1	3–1	1–1	3–1	2–1	7–1
4	Deportivo Lute	16	8	3	5	23	18	+5	27	Advance to Second Stage	3–0	2–2	1–0		2–0	0–0	1–0	3–1	1–1
5	Juan Aurich	16	6	4	6	15	16	−1	22		0–0	1–0	2–0	2–0		2–0	2–0	0–0	3–0
6	Universidad César Vallejo II	16	4	5	7	20	21	−1	17		1–1	1–2	1–1	0–2	3–0		1–0	2–0	4–0
7	Cultural Volante	16	5	2	9	15	20	−5	17		0–1	1–1	3–0	2–0	2–0	3–0		2–1	0–3
8	Carlos Stein	16	4	4	8	18	26	−8	16		3–1	4–1	0–3	1–2	1–1	2–2	0–0		2–1
9	Sport Bolognesi (R)	16	4	3	9	17	45	−28	15 (Note: The Disciplinary Committee declared a 3-point deduction against Club Sport Bolognesi, due to an out-of-line player, in the match on matchday 15, between Sport Bolognesi and Carlos Stein, which ended in a 4-0 victory, but the Disciplinary Committee declared Carlos Stein the winner by 3-0. Therefore, Sport Bolognesi is relegated to the 2026 Copa Perú.)	Relegation to Copa Perú	1–2	2–1	1–1	0–3	0–0	3–2	3–1	0–3	

Updated to match(es) played on 3 August 2025. Source:
Legend: Blue = home team win; Yellow = draw; Red = away team win.
(R) Relegated

=== Group 2 ===
Pos	Team	Pld	W	D	L	GF	GA	GD	Pts	Qualification	UNI	CNI	ALI	HUA	SBA	PAC	PAR	MUN	AMA	JSD
1	Universitario II	18	9	5	4	28	11	+17	32	Advance to Second Stage		0–0	1–2	1–0	1–0	1–1	3–1	3–0	1–1	5–0
2	Estudiantil CNI	18	8	7	3	28	12	+16	31	Advance to Second Stage	1–1		0–0	0–0	1–0	1–1	0–0	4–2	4–0	3–0
3	Alianza Lima II	18	8	5	5	32	19	+13	29	Advance to Second Stage	1–0	1–1		3–4	3–0	2–2	4–0	1–1	2–0	6–0
4	Unión Huaral	18	8	5	5	24	18	+6	29	Advance to Second Stage	1–1	2–1	0–1		2–2	3–0	3–0	2–1	3–2	0–3
5	Sport Boys II	18	8	4	6	22	17	+5	28		1–2	2–1	4–0	1–0		1–1	2–0	2–1	1–0	1–2
6	Pacífico	18	6	8	4	19	18	+1	26		1–0	0–1	2–0	0–0	1–2		1–0	2–1	2–1	2–1
7	Centro Social Pariacoto	18	7	1	10	16	32	−16	22		0–3	2–1	1–5	0–2	1–0	2–1		3–0	0–1	1–0
8	Deportivo Municipal (D, R)	18	5	4	9	21	27	−6	19	Disqualified from the competition	0–3	0–1	1–0	1–0	0–0	1–1	5–1		2–3	2–0
9	Amazon Callao	18	5	3	10	16	29	−13	18		1–0	1–4	1–0	0–1	1–1	0–0	0–1	0–2		2–1
10	Juventud Santo Domingo	18	3	4	11	15	39	−24	13		0–2	0–4	1–1	1–1	0–2	1–1	1–3	1–1	3–2	

Updated to match(es) played on 3 August 2025. Source:
Legend: Blue = home team win; Yellow = draw; Red = away team win.
(D) Disqualified; (R) Relegated

=== Group 3 ===
Pos	Team	Pld	W	D	L	GF	GA	GD	Pts	Qualification	UCR	CON	CRI	HUA	ADT	UDA	ECO	MUN	RAU
1	Deportivo Ucrania	16	9	4	3	29	13	+16	31	Advance to Second Stage		1–1	1–0	2–1	1–1	4–1	5–0	2–0	3–0
2	Construcción Civil	16	9	4	3	27	11	+16	31	Advance to Second Stage	1–0		3–1	1–1	3–1	3–0	2–0	3–1	3–0
3	Nuevo San Cristóbal	16	10	1	5	30	18	+12	31	Advance to Second Stage	0–1	2–1		3–2	0–0	3–0	2–1	2–0	3–0
4	Sport Huancayo II	16	9	3	4	28	17	+11	30	Advance to Second Stage	2–0	2–1	2–3		2–0	1–0	3–1	1–1	3–0
5	ADT II	16	8	5	3	26	12	+14	29		3–0	0–0	4–2	2–0		0–0	1–0	3–0	3–0
6	UDA	16	7	4	5	21	19	+2	25		1–1	1–0	1–0	0–1	2–2		2–1	3–2	3–0
7	Ecosem Pasco	16	5	2	9	18	27	−9	17		0–3	1–1	1–2	1–1	2–0	0–3		2–1	3–0
8	Deportivo Municipal (Pangoa)	16	2	3	11	18	32	−14	9		2–2	0–1	1–4	2–3	0–3	1–1	1–2		3–0
9	Rauker (D, R)	16	0	0	16	0	48	−48	0 (Note: Rauker was disqualified and relegated to the 2026 Copa Perú after accumulating two walkovers (Matchdays 2 and 3).)	Disqualified from the competition	0–3	0–3	0–3	0–3	0–3	0–3	0–3	0–3	

Updated to match(es) played on 9 August 2025. Source:
Legend: Blue = home team win; Yellow = draw; Red = away team win.
(D) Disqualified; (R) Relegated

=== Group 4 ===
Pos	Team	Pld	W	D	L	GF	GA	GD	Pts	Qualification	DEF	NAC	ALF	MEL	PAT	ALT	CIE	SAN	DIA
1	Defensor José María Arguedas	16	10	3	3	35	19	+16	33	Advance to Second Stage		1–1	0–1	2–1	2–0	1–1	4–0	4–0	3–1
2	Nacional	16	9	5	2	40	19	+21	32	Advance to Second Stage	4–2		2–1	0–2	1–0	2–0	2–0	1–1	1–0
3	Juventud Alfa	16	10	2	4	36	15	+21	32	Advance to Second Stage	2–0	2–0		2–1	2–1	4–0	0–0	4–2	4–0
4	Melgar II	16	8	2	6	30	21	+9	26	Advance to Second Stage	2–3	3–3	2–1		1–0	2–3	3–1	5–0	0–3
5	Patriotas	16	7	1	8	30	18	+12	22		0–1	1–2	3–2	3–0		3–0	4–0	1–0	8–1
6	Alto Rendimiento	16	4	4	8	21	29	−8	16		2–3	1–1	1–1	0–2	2–1		1–0	1–2	7–1
7	Cienciano II	16	4	4	8	19	29	−10	16		2–2	3–3	0–1	0–3	2–1	2–0		3–0	2–2
8	Real San Antonio	16	4	4	8	16	30	−14	16		0–4	1–2	3–0	0–0	1–3	0–0	3–1		1–1
9	Diablos Rojos (D, R)	16	2	3	11	17	64	−47	9	Disqualified from the competition	2–3	1–15	0–9	0–3	1–1	4–2	0–3	0–2	

Updated to match(es) played on 3 August 2025. Source:
Legend: Blue = home team win; Yellow = draw; Red = away team win.
(D) Disqualified; (R) Relegated

== Second Stage ==
In the Second Stage, teams ranked 1st and 2nd in the Regional stage started with 2 and 1 extra points respectively. Points earned during the Regional Stage do not carry over during the Second Stage.

=== Group A ===
Pos	Team	Pld	W	D	L	GF	GA	GD	Pts	Qualification	CNI	USD	CAU	HUA
1	Estudiantil CNI	6	3	1	2	11	5	+6	11	Advance to Quarterfinals		0–1	3–0	3–0
2	Unión Santo Domingo	6	2	1	3	7	8	−1	9	Advance to Quarterfinals	1–1		3–1	1–3
3	Juventud Cautivo	6	3	0	3	7	9	−2	9		2–1	2–1		2–0
4	Unión Huaral	6	3	0	3	6	9	−3	9		1–3	1–0	1–0	

Updated to match(es) played on 20 September 2025. Source:
Legend: Blue = home team win; Yellow = draw; Red = away team win.

=== Group B ===
Pos	Team	Pld	W	D	L	GF	GA	GD	Pts	Qualification	UNI	ALI	JUV	LUT
1	Universitario II	6	4	2	0	8	2	+6	16	Advance to Quarterfinals		0–0	2–1	2–0
2	Alianza Lima II	6	2	3	1	6	5	+1	9	Advance to Quarterfinals	1–1		1–0	1–1
3	Juventus	6	2	0	4	6	8	−2	7		0–1	2–0		3–2
4	Deportivo Lute	6	1	1	4	6	11	−5	4		0–2	1–3	2–0	

Updated to match(es) played on 20 September 2025. Source:
Legend: Blue = home team win; Yellow = draw; Red = away team win.

=== Group C ===
Pos	Team	Pld	W	D	L	GF	GA	GD	Pts	Qualification	MEL	NAC	UCR	CRI
1	Melgar II	6	6	0	0	13	2	+11	18	Advance to Quarterfinals		2–0	2–0	3–2
2	Nacional	6	2	2	2	11	8	+3	9	Advance to Quarterfinals	0–1		1–1	3–1
3	Deportivo Ucrania	6	0	3	3	4	11	−7	5		0–3	1–1		0–2
4	Nuevo San Cristóbal	6	1	1	4	9	16	−7	4		0–2	2–6	2–2	

Updated to match(es) played on 21 September 2025. Source:
Legend: Blue = home team win; Yellow = draw; Red = away team win.

=== Group D ===
Pos	Team	Pld	W	D	L	GF	GA	GD	Pts	Qualification	HUA	DEF	ALF	CON
1	Sport Huancayo B	6	4	0	2	10	7	+3	12	Advance to Quarterfinals		2–0	1–2	1–0
2	Defensor José María Arguedas	6	2	2	2	7	5	+2	10	Advance to Quarterfinals	2–3		0–0	4–0
3	Juventud Alfa	6	2	2	2	5	6	−1	8		1–2	0–0		2–1
4	Construcción Civil	6	2	0	4	5	9	−4	7		2–1	0–1	2–0	

Updated to match(es) played on 21 September 2025. Source:
Legend: Blue = home team win; Yellow = draw; Red = away team win.

== Playoffs ==
=== Bracket ===
Quarterfinals
Sport Huancayo II	0	4	4 (4)
Nacional	3	1	4 (2)
Melgar II	1	0	1
Defensor José María Arguedas	2	0	2
Estudiantil CNI	1	1	2
Alianza Lima II	0	1	1
Universitario II	0	2	2
Unión Santo Domingo	1	0	1

Semifinals
Sport Huancayo II	1	2	3
Defensor José María Arguedas	0	1	1
Estudiantil CNI	1	0	1
Universitario II	0	0	0

Finals
Sport Huancayo II	2	1	3
Estudiantil CNI	1	1	2

=== Quarterfinals ===
==== First leg ====
3 October 2025	Unión Santo Domingo	1–0	Universitario II	Gran Kuélap, Chachapoyas
15:00	Joyce Conde 63' (pen.)			Referee: Wuilder Espinoza

4 October 2025	Alianza Lima II	0–1	Estudiantil CNI	Hugo Sotil, Lima
12:00			José García 23'	Referee: Abimelec Rojas

5 October 2025	Nacional	3–0	Sport Huancayo II	Municipal de Mollendo, Mollendo
15:00	Jean Pierre Valdivia 45+4' 84' 90+8'			Referee: Édson Laura

5 October 2025	Defensor José María Arguedas	2–1	Melgar II	Los Chankas, Andahuaylas
15:00	Sebastián López 47'; Ollanta Ttupa 90+5'		Bruno Portugal 61'	Referee: Raúl Pastor

==== Second leg ====
11 October 2025	Sport Huancayo II	4–1 (4–2 p)	Nacional	Huancayo, Huancayo
11:00	Juan David Martínez 16', 82', 92+'		Ramiro Benaviente 50'	Referee: Jordan Casas
	Penalties
	Jeremi Espinoza (penalty scored); Sergio Barboza (penalty missed); Valentino Balbuena (penalty scored); Edú Villar (penalty scored); Diego Caravaño (penalty scored)		Luis Pastor (penalty scored); Renato Abarca (penalty missed); Jean Pierre Valdivia (penalty scored); Ramiro Benavente (penalty missed)

12 October 2025	Melgar II	0–0	Defensor José María Arguedas	CAR Melgar, Arequipa
14:00

12 October 2025	Estudiantil CNI	1–1	Alianza Lima II	Max Augustín, Iquitos
15:00	Faber Asprilla 60'		Mauricio Arrasco 23'

13 October 2025	Universitario II	2–0	Unión Santo Domingo	CampoMar U, Lima
11:00	Esteban Cruz 2' 18'			Referee: Mario Quispe

=== Semifinals ===
==== First leg ====
19 October 2025	Defensor José María Arguedas	0–1	Sport Huancayo II	Los Chankas, Andahuaylas
15:00			Cristian Mendoza 53'	Referee: Anthony Carlos

19 October 2025	Estudiantil CNI	1–0	Universitario II	Max Augustín, Iquitos
15:15	Antonio Acosta 60'			Referee: Abimelec Rojas

==== Second leg ====
25 October 2025	Sport Huancayo II	2–1	Defensor José María Arguedas	Huancayo, Huancayo
11:00	Juan Martínez 36' (pen.) 60'		Ollanta Ttupa 68'

27 October 2025	Universitario II	0–0	Estudiantil CNI	CampoMar U, Lima
15:00

=== Final ===
The winning team promoted to Liga 2 for the 2026 season.

2 November 2025	Estudiantil CNI	1–2	Sport Huancayo II	Max Augustín, Iquitos
15:15	Ronald Ríos 67'		Juan D. Martínez 44' 48'	Referee: Alexander Blas

8 November 2025	Sport Huancayo II	1–1	Estudiantil CNI	Huancayo, Huancayo
11:00	Cris Huyhua 8'		Antonio Acosta 40'	Referee: Walter Guadalupe

== Play-off de Ascenso ==
The winning team promoted to Liga 2 for the 2026 season.

23 November 2025	Estudiantil CNI	2–1	ANBA Perú	Max Augustín, Iquitos
15:00	Élver Torres 43' 45+5'		Alberto Vela 55'	Referee: Jordi Espinoza

30 November 2025	ANBA Perú	2–1 (2–4 p)	Estudiantil CNI	Guillermo Briceño Rosamedina, Juliaca
15:00	Renny Luque 9'; Alberto Vela 45+1' (pen.)		Pablo Labrín 89'
	Penalties
	Pedro Zúñiga (penalty scored); Renny Luque (penalty missed); Sait Ballesteros (penalty scored); Jorge Blanco (penalty missed)		Pablo Labrín (penalty scored); José Luis García (penalty scored); Ronald Rios (penalty scored); Antonio Acosta (penalty scored)

== Top scorers ==
As of 8 November 2025

Rank	Player	Club	Goals
1	(Peru) Juan David Martínez	Sport Huancayo II	18
2	(Peru) Jair Córdova	Defensor José María Arguedas	15
3	(Peru) Jean Pierre Valdivia	Nacional FBC	12
4	(Peru) Pablo Labrin	Estudiantil CNI	12
5	(Peru) Goth Quispe	Nuevo San Cristóbal	11
6	(Peru) Joyce Conde	Unión Santo Domingo	10
7	(Peru) Angel Medina	Juventud Alfa FC	10
8	(Peru) Sinclair Garcia	Juventud Cautivo	10
9	(Peru) Eduardo Urtecho	Universitario II	10
10	(Peru) Víctor Guzmán	Alianza Lima II	9
11	(Peru) Jesús Chávez	Pacífico FC	9

== See also ==
- 2025 Liga 1
- 2025 Liga 2
- 2025 Copa Perú
- 2025 Ligas Departamentales del Perú
- 2025 Liga Femenina
- 2025 Torneo Juvenil Sub-18
