= 2026 Liga 3 (Peru) =

Liga 3
- Season: 2026
- Dates: 30 May – November 2026
- Relegated: ADT II; Amazon Callao; Carlos Stein; Corazón de León – AR; Defensor José María Arguedas; Deportivo Coopsol; Juventus; Ucayali

The 2026 Liga 3 (known as the Liga 3 Joma 2026 for sponsorship reasons) will be the 2nd edition of the third tier of Federación Peruana de Futbol.

== Teams ==
In January 2026, the club administrator, Ángel Gustavo Medina Arias, confirmed that for the current season, Sporting Company of Arequipa will take over the full management of Real San Antonio of Moquegua, the team set to compete in Liga 3.

In February 2026, Alto Rendimiento agreed to merge with Club Corazón de León of Cusco, which in 2022 earned promotion to the Liga Distrital del Cusco of the Copa Perú. One of the first decisions resulting from this merger is that the newly rebranded Corazón de León – Alto Rendimiento will no longer play in Madre de Dios and will instead host its home matches in the city of Cusco.

On March 10, 2026, it was announced that Defensor José María Arguedas decided to withdraw from the tournament due to the lack of commitment and appreciation shown by some players toward the human, financial, and institutional efforts made by the club’s management. However, the club later reversed its decision and confirmed its participation in Liga 3.

On March 27 2026, Deportivo Municipal was officially relegated from the professional ranks (Liga 3) to the Copa Perú as of March 2026 due to severe, unresolved financial problems. Likewise, on May 7, 2026, Liga Nacional de Fútbol Aficionado ratified the decision and confirmed the relegation of Club Centro Deportivo Municipal to the immediately lower category from Liga 3. LINFA decided to reinstate Juventud Santo Domingo to Liga 3 through Resolution No. 003-2026-CA-LINFA, despite the club having been relegated the previous season.

On April 23, 2026, Construcción Civil officially changed its name to Asociación Deportiva Ucayali FC.

In May 2026, Centro Social Pariacoto officially announced that it would come under the administration of the traditional club José Gálvez of Chimbote, in accordance with the strategic guidelines agreed upon by both institutions. As part of this process, the club will adopt the name Centro Gálvez Pariacoto. However, in September, Centro Social Pariacoto announced that its strategic partnership with the traditional Chimbote-based club José Gálvez had come to an end.

On June 27, 2026, Defensor José María Arguedas announced in an official statement that the Liga Nacional de Fútbol Aficionado (LINFA) had decided to exclude the club from the 2026 Liga 3. Following the announcement, the Andahuaylas-based club expressed its regret over the decision, which it considers arbitrary, lacking legal and factual grounds, and contrary to the principles of sporting justice.

In August 2026, Corazón de León was retirated from the tournament after receiving its second walkover for failing to play against Sporting Company on matchday 9, resulting in its automatic relegation. The first walkover occurred against Melgar on matchday 6, when the club failed to provide an ambulance for the match.

=== Team changes ===
Promoted from 2025 Copa Perú	Qualified from 2025 Torneo Juvenil Sub-18	Relegated from 2025 Liga 2	Promoted to 2026 Liga 2	Relegated to 2026 Copa Perú
▲ANBA Perú (2nd) ▲ Juventud Huracán (3rd) ▲ASA (4th) ▲AD Tahuishco (7th)	▲ Sporting Cristal II (1st)	▼ Deportivo Coopsol (15th)	▲ Sport Huancayo II (1st) ▲ Estudiantil CNI (2nd)	▼ Sport Bolognesi (Group 1 - 9th) ▼ Deportivo Municipal (Disqualified) ▼ Rauker (Disqualified) ▼ Diablos Rojos (Disqualified)

=== Stadia and locations ===
Locations of the 2026 Liga 3 teams

Team	City	Stadium	Capacity
ADT II	Tarma	Unión Tarma	9,100
AD Tahuishco	Moyobamba	IPD de Moyobamba	8,000
Alianza Lima II	Lima	Hugo Sotil	13,773
Amazon Callao	Callao	Campolo Alcalde	3,000
ANBA Perú	Juliaca	Guillermo Briceño Rosamedina	20,030
ASA	Chancay	Rómulo Shaw Cisneros	3,000
Carlos Stein	Negritos	Wilberto Herrera Carlín	3,000
Centro Gálvez Pariacoto	Chimbote	Manuel Rivera Sánchez	32,000
Cienciano II	Calca	Thomas Ernesto Payne	8,000
Corazón de León – AR	Yauri	Municipal de Espinar	16,000
Cultural Volante	Bambamarca	Municipal El Frutillo	5,000
Defensor José María Arguedas	Andahuaylas	Municipal de Talavera	6,500
Deportivo Coopsol	Chancay	Rómulo Shaw Cisneros	3,000
Deportivo Lute	Lambayeque	César Flores Marigorda	7,000
Deportivo Municipal (Pangoa)	Satipo	Municipal de Mazamari	5,000
Deportivo Ucrania	Nueva Cajamarca	IPD de Nueva Cajamarca	12,000
Ecosem Pasco	Cerro de Pasco	Daniel Alcides Carrión	12,000
Juan Aurich	Chiclayo	Elías Aguirre	24,000
Juventud Cautivo	Sullana	Campeones del 36	12,000
Juventud Huracán	Supe	Edgardo Reyes Bolívar	2,000
Juventud Santo Domingo	Nazca	Municipal de Nasca	10,000
Juventus	Huamachuco	Municipal de Huamachuco	5,000
Melgar II	Arequipa	CAR - FBC Melgar	–
Nacional	Mollendo	Municipal de Mollendo	5,000
Nuevo San Cristóbal	Kimbiri	Municipal de Kimbiri	5,000
Pacífico	Huacho	Segundo Aranda Torres	11,500
Patriotas	Tacna	Jorge Basadre	19,850
Sport Boys II	Callao	Campolo Alcalde	2,000
Sporting Company	Arequipa	25 de Noviembre	–
Sporting Cristal II	Lima	La Florida	–
Ucayali	Pucallpa	Aliardo Soria Pérez	25,848
UDA	Huancavelica	IPD de Huancavelica	8,500
Unión Huaral	Huaral	Julio Lores Colán	6,000
Unión Santo Domingo	Chachapoyas	Gran Kuélap	1,000
Universidad César Vallejo II	Trujillo	César Acuña Peralta	2,000
Universitario II	Lima	Campo Mar - U	–
Valle Sagrado	Calca	Thomas Ernesto Payne	8,000

== Torneo Regional ==
=== Group 1 ===
Pos	Team	Pld	W	D	L	GF	GA	GD	Pts	Qualification	USD	CAU	VOL	AUR	UCV	JSD	LUT	STE	JUV
1	Unión Santo Domingo	16	11	3	2	33	7	+26	36	Advance to Second Stage		0–0	3–0	2–1	4–1	7–0	3–0	5–0	2–0
2	Juventud Cautivo	16	10	3	3	36	11	+25	33	Advance to Second Stage	1–2		4–1	2–0	3–0	3–0	4–1	7–1	3–1
3	Cultural Volante	16	9	1	6	19	18	+1	28	Advance to Second Stage	1–0	1–0		1–0	1–0	1–0	2–0	2–0	4–3
4	Juan Aurich	16	8	2	6	18	14	+4	26	Advance to Second Stage	1–1	2–0	0–0		2–0	1–2	2–1	2–1	1–0
5	Universidad César Vallejo II	16	6	2	8	24	21	+3	20		0–1	1–1	2–0	1–0		2–0	2–0	4–0	6–0
6	Juventud Santo Domingo	16	6	2	8	13	27	−14	20		2–1	0–1	2–0	0–1	1–0		0–0	1–0	1–0
7	Deportivo Lute	16	5	4	7	18	23	−5	19		0–0	1–1	2–0	0–2	2–1	3–1		3–1	5–3
8	Carlos Stein (R)	16	5	1	10	20	36	−16	16	Relegation to Copa Perú	0–1	0–3	2–1	0–3	4–2	6–2	0–0		2–0
9	Juventus (R)	16	2	2	12	14	38	−24	8	Relegation to Copa Perú	0–1	0–3	0–4	3–0	2–2	1–1	1–0	0–3	

Updated to match(es) played on 17 october 2026. Source: LINFA
Legend: Blue = home team win; Yellow = draw; Red = away team win.
(R) Relegated

=== Group 2 ===
Pos	Team	Pld	W	D	L	GF	GA	GD	Pts	Qualification	ALI	PAC	UNI	CRI	HUA	HUR	PAR	SBA	COO	AMA
1	Alianza Lima II	18	10	5	3	25	16	+9	35	Advance to Second Stage		1–0	0–0	2–2	1–2	4–1	0–1	2–1	1–0	1–0
2	Pacífico	18	9	5	4	30	16	+14	32	Advance to Second Stage	0–1		3–0	1–1	2–2	2–2	3–0	0–0	3–0	1–2
3	Universitario II	18	8	6	4	26	19	+7	30	Advance to Second Stage	1–1	2–2		0–3	2–1	2–2	1–2	1–1	3–0	3–0
4	Sporting Cristal II	18	7	7	4	34	21	+13	28	Advance to Second Stage	1–1	2–3	2–0		4–3	2–1	5–1	1–3	1–1	0–0
5	Unión Huaral	18	7	4	7	24	26	−2	25		0–2	2–0	0–4	1–1		1–0	0–2	2–1	4–1	3–3
6	Juventud Huracán	18	6	5	7	32	29	+3	23		2–3	1–2	0–1	1–0	1–0		3–2	7–2	1–0	2–4
7	Centro Social Pariacoto	18	6	3	9	17	34	−17	21		1–1	0–3	0–1	0–3	0–3	0–4		2–0	2–1	1–0
8	Sport Boys II	18	4	6	8	22	28	−6	18		3–0	0–2	1–3	1–1	0–1	1–1	2–2		2–0	0–1
9	Deportivo Coopsol (R)	18	4	5	9	19	28	−9	17	Relegation to Copa Perú	1–2	0–1	1–1	2–1	2–0	3–3	3–0	1–1		1–1
10	Amazon Callao (R)	18	3	6	9	14	27	−13	15	Relegation to Copa Perú	0–2	0–2	0–1	0–4	0–0	0–0	1–1	1–3	1–2	

Updated to match(es) played on 17 October 2026. Source: LINFA
Legend: Blue = home team win; Yellow = draw; Red = away team win.
(R) Relegated

=== Group 3 ===
Pos	Team	Pld	W	D	L	GF	GA	GD	Pts	Qualification	ASA	ECO	UCR	UDA	CRI	MUN	TAH	ADT	UCA
1	ASA	16	10	2	4	37	17	+20	32	Advance to Second Stage		4–2	3–1	5–0	3–0	2–1	3–0	1–0	3–1
2	Ecosem Pasco	16	9	2	5	29	20	+9	29	Advance to Second Stage	1–0		2–0	1–0	5–1	4–3	3–1	2–1	4–0
3	Deportivo Ucrania	16	8	4	4	35	19	+16	28	Advance to Second Stage	1–1	1–0		9–1	3–0	3–0	2–0	2–1	2–0
4	UDA	16	7	3	6	25	33	−8	24	Advance to Second Stage	3–0	0–0	4–2		0–3	1–0	3–1	4–3	2–1
5	Nuevo San Cristóbal	16	7	2	7	20	30	−10	23		2–5	2–0	2–1	2–2		1–1	2–1	1–2	2–1
6	Deportivo Municipal (Pangoa)	16	6	4	6	20	18	+2	22		2–1	2–0	1–1	3–1	0–1		2–0	3–1	1–0
7	AD Tahuishco	16	5	3	8	25	28	−3	18		0–0	2–0	2–5	0–3	3–0	0–0		8–1	3–1
8	ADT II (R)	16	5	3	8	29	35	−6	18	Relegation to Copa Perú	3–2	1–3	2–2	2–0	3–0	0–0	2–2		5–0
9	Ucayali (R)	16	2	3	11	15	35	−20	9	Relegation to Copa Perú	0–4	2–2	0–0	1–1	0–1	2–1	1–2	5–2	

Updated to match(es) played on 10 October 2026. Source:
Legend: Blue = home team win; Yellow = draw; Red = away team win.
(R) Relegated

=== Group 4 ===
Pos	Team	Pld	W	D	L	GF	GA	GD	Pts	Qualification	MEL	COM	NAC	VAL	ANB	CIE	PAT	ALT	DEF
1	Melgar II	16	13	0	3	48	19	+29	39	Advance to Second Stage		3–0	4–1	3–4	4–2	3–2	9–0	3–0	3–2
2	Sporting Company	16	10	2	4	42	18	+24	32	Advance to Second Stage	2–0		3–0	4–3	0–1	6–0	9–1	3–0	2–2
3	Nacional	16	10	2	4	34	17	+17	32	Advance to Second Stage	3–2	1–2		2–0	4–0	1–1	4–0	3–0	3–0
4	Valle Sagrado	16	10	0	6	38	21	+17	30	Advance to Second Stage	1–2	5–0	2–0		0–1	2–1	4–1	3–0	3–0
5	ANBA Perú	16	8	5	3	38	16	+22	29		0–2	1–1	0–0	2–1		4–1	15–0	3–0	3–0
6	Cienciano II	16	5	3	8	24	25	−1	18		1–2	1–0	1–3	1–2	1–1		5–0	3–0	3–0
7	Patriotas	16	4	2	10	17	59	−42	14		1–2	0–4	2–3	1–3	1–1	0–0		1–0	3–0
8	Corazón de León – AR (Note: In August 2026, Corazón de León–AR were excluded from Liga 3 by LINFA after accumulating their second walkover, with the first occurring on matchday 6 and the second on matchday 9.) (D, R)	14	2	1	11	5	34	−29	7	Disqualified from the competition	0–3	0–3	0–3	3–2	1–1	1–0	0–3		n.p.
9	Defensor José María Arguedas (Note: In June 2026, Defensor José María Arguedas were excluded from Liga 3 by the LINFA.) (D, R)	14	0	1	13	4	41	−37	1	Disqualified from the competition	0–3	0–3	0–3	0–3	0–3	0–3	0–3	n.p.	

Updated to match(es) played on 10 october 2026. Source:
Legend: Blue = home team win; Yellow = draw; Red = away team win.
(D) Disqualified; (R) Relegated

== Second Stage ==
In the Second Stage, teams ranked 1st and 2nd in the Regional stage started with 2 and 1 extra points respectively. Points earned during the Regional Stage do not carry over during the Second Stage.

=== Group A ===
Pos	Team	Pld	W	D	L	GF	GA	GD	Pts	Qualification	CRI	PAC	USD	VOL
1	Sporting Cristal II	6	4	1	1	18	7	+11	13	Advance to Quarterfinals		5–1	6–1	3–1
2	Pacífico	6	4	0	2	17	14	+3	13	Advance to Quarterfinals	3–2		0–1	6–1
3	Unión Santo Domingo	6	3	1	2	12	11	+1	12		1–1	3–4		5–0
4	Cultural Volante	6	0	0	6	4	19	−15	0		0–1	2–3	0–1	

Updated to match(es) played on 21 November 2026. Source:
Legend: Blue = home team win; Yellow = draw; Red = away team win.

=== Group B ===
Pos	Team	Pld	W	D	L	GF	GA	GD	Pts	Qualification	ALI	CAU	UNI	AUR
1	Alianza Lima II	6	3	1	2	11	6	+5	12	Advance to Quarterfinals		1–0	1–1	6–0
2	Juventud Cautivo	6	3	1	2	8	4	+4	11	Advance to Quarterfinals	3–1		1–1	0–1
3	Universitario II	6	2	2	2	7	6	+1	8		0–1	0–1		2–0
4	Juan Aurich	6	2	0	4	5	15	−10	6		2–1	0–3	2–3	

Updated to match(es) played on 22 November 2026. Source:
Legend: Blue = home team win; Yellow = draw; Red = away team win.

=== Group C ===
Pos	Team	Pld	W	D	L	GF	GA	GD	Pts	Qualification	ASA	VAL	COM	UCR
1	ASA	6	5	0	1	14	6	+8	17	Advance to Quarterfinals		2–0	2–0	4–2
2	Valle Sagrado	6	3	0	3	12	12	0	9	Advance to Quarterfinals	1–2		3–1	4–1
3	Sporting Company	6	2	1	3	12	13	−1	8		0–2	5–2		2–2
4	Deportivo Ucrania	6	1	1	4	11	18	−7	4		3–2	1–2	2–4	

Updated to match(es) played on 15 November 2026. Source:
Legend: Blue = home team win; Yellow = draw; Red = away team win.

=== Group D ===
Pos	Team	Pld	W	D	L	GF	GA	GD	Pts	Qualification	MEL	ECO	NAC	UDA
1	Melgar II	6	4	0	2	17	11	+6	14	Advance to Quarterfinals		2–1	3–4	3–1
2	Ecosem Pasco	6	4	0	2	22	9	+13	13	Advance to Quarterfinals	3–2		1–0	13–1
3	Nacional	6	3	0	3	17	17	0	9		0–2	2–1		8–5
4	UDA	6	1	0	5	16	35	−19	3		2–5	2–3	5–3	

Updated to match(es) played on 15 november 2026. Source:
Legend: Blue = home team win; Yellow = draw; Red = away team win.

== Playoffs ==
=== Bracket ===
Quarterfinals
Melgar II
Valle Sagrado
ASA
Ecosem Pasco
Sporting Cristal II
Juventud Cautivo
Alianza Lima II
Pacífico

Semifinals

Finals

=== Quarterfinals ===
==== First leg ====
Valle Sagrado	–	Melgar II

Ecosem Pasco	–	ASA

Juventud Cautivo	–	Sporting Cristal II

Pacífico	–	Alianza Lima II

==== Second leg ====
Melgar II	–	Valle Sagrado

ASA	–	Ecosem Pasco

Sporting Cristal II	–	Juventud Cautivo

Alianza Lima II	–	Pacífico

== See also ==
- 2026 Liga 1
- 2026 Liga 2
- 2026 Tradición Copera
- 2026 Copa Perú
- 2026 Ligas Departamentales del Perú
- 2026 Liga Femenina
- 2026 Liga Nacional Juvenil FPF
