= 2025 Copa Perú =

Copa Perú
- Season: 2025
- Champions: Unión Minas (1st title)

The 2025 Peru Cup season (Spanish: Copa Perú 2025), the largest amateur tournament of Peruvian football. The District Stage (Spanish: Ligas Distritales) started in February - March, and the National Stage (Spanish: Etapa Nacional) started in September.

Unión Minas were crowned champions of the 2025 Copa Perú after defeating ANBA Perú in a penalty shootout in the final played at Hugo Sotil Yerén Stadium in Villa El Salvador.

== Team changes ==
Promoted to 2025 Liga 2	Promoted to 2025 Liga 3		
▲ Bentín Tacna Heroica (1st) ▲ Cajamarca (2nd)	▲ Unión Santo Domingo (Amazonas 1) ▲ Centro Social Pariacoto (Áncash 1) ▲ Defensor José María Arguedas (Apurímac 1) ▲ Nacional (Arequipa 1) ▲ Nuevo San Cristóbal (Ayacucho 1) ▲ Cultural Volante (Cajamarca 1) ▲ Amazon Callao (Callao 1) ▲ Juventud Alfa (Cusco 1) ▲UDA (Huancavelica 1)	▲ Construcción Civil (Huánuco 1) ▲ Juventud Santo Domingo (Ica 1) ▲ Deportivo Municipal (Pangoa) (Junín 1) ▲ Juventus (La Libertad 1) ▲ Deportivo Lute (Lambayeque 1) ▲ Pacífico (Lima 1) ▲ Estudiantil CNI (Loreto 1) ▲ Alto Rendimiento (Madre de Dios 1)	▲ Real San Antonio (Moquegua 1) ▲ Ecosem Pasco (Pasco 1) ▲ Juventud Cautivo (Piura 1) ▲ Diablos Rojos (Puno 1) ▲ Deportivo Ucrania (San Martín 1) ▲ Patriotas (Tacna 1) ▲ Sport Bolognesi (Tumbes 1) ▲ Rauker (Ucayali 1)

== Departmental stage ==
Departmental Stage: 2025 Ligas Departamentales del Perú

The following list shows the teams that qualified for the National Stage.

Department	Team	Location
Amazonas	Bagua FC	Bagua
Amazonas	Amazonas FC	Chachapoyas
Ancash	Sport Ayash Huamanin	Chavín de Huantar
Ancash	Real Puerto Chimbote	Chimbote
Ancash	Real Independiente	San Marcos
Apurímac	Instituto Apurímac	Andahuaylas
Apurímac	Cultural Huancarama	Huancarama
Apurímac	Hijos de Piscobamba	Orcobamba
Arequipa	Amigos de la PNP	Cayma
Arequipa	Viargoca	Atico
Arequipa	FD Galaxy	Majes
Ayacucho	Defensor Patibamba	Patibamba
Ayacucho	Señor de Quinuapata	Ayacucho
Ayacucho	FC Tambo	Tambo
Cajamarca	ADA Cajabamba	Cajabamba
Cajamarca	Las Palmas	Chota
Callao	Calidad Porteña	La Perla
Callao	Hacienda San Agustín	Callao
Cusco	Deportivo Múnich Sol Naciente	Challabamba
Cusco	UNISPA	Pallpata
Cusco	Señor Justo Juez	San Salvador
Huancavelica	Sport Machete	Lircay
Huancavelica	Diablos Rojos	Huancavelica
Huánuco	Miguel Grau UDH	Huánuco
Huánuco	León de Huánuco	Huánuco
Huánuco	Deportivo Municipal (Chacos)	San Rafael, Ambo
Ica	Alianza Pisco	Pisco
Ica	Juventud Ccontacc	Puquio
Ica	Sport Puerto Aéreo	La Tinguiña
Junín	Unión Juventud Pomacocha	Yauli
Junín	Atlético Chanchamayo	Chanchamayo
Junín	Atlético Suma Motors	Huancayo

Department	Team	Location
La Libertad	Sport River	Florencia de Mora
La Libertad	Juventud Bellavista	La Esperanza
La Libertad	El Inca	Chao
Lambayeque	Deportivo Tumi	Pimentel
Lambayeque	Cachorro	Motupe
Lambayeque	América de Tepo	Mochumi
Lima	Real Huarcos	San Vicente de Cañete
Lima	ASA	Chancay
Lima	Juventud Huracán	Supe
Loreto	Nihue Rao	San Juan Bautista
Loreto	Defensor Balsapuerto	Balsa Puerto
Madre de Dios	La Masía Nace	Huepetuhe
Madre de Dios	Colegio Nacional Billinghurst	Puerto Maldonado
Moquegua	Hijos del Altiplano y del Pacífico	El Algarrobal
Moquegua	Barrio 12	Samegua
Pasco	Unión Minas	Cerro de Pasco
Pasco	Deportivo Municipal (Palcazú)	Palcazu
Piura	Atlético Torino	Talara
Piura	Jibaja Che	Huancabamba
Piura	Estudiantes de Chancay	Bernal
Puno	ANBA Perú	Juliaca
Puno	San Martín Tours	Chupa
Puno	Illanes 48 Llallahua	Santiago de Pupuja
San Martín	Grandez	Tarapoto
San Martín	Alianza Tres Unidos	Tres Unidos
San Martín	AD Tahuishco	Moyobamba
Tacna	Real Sociedad	Ciudad Nueva
Tacna	Dínamo de Solabaya	Ilabaya
Tumbes	UNT	Tumbes
Tumbes	Independiente Zorritos	Zorritos
Ucayali	Colegio Comercio	Callería
Ucayali	Atlético Nacional	Yarinacocha

== National Stage ==
=== Round of 64 ===
==== Zona Norte ====
Team 1	Agg.	Team 2	1st leg	2nd leg
Real Independiente	2–5	Miguel Grau UDH	1–3	1–2
León de Huánuco	0–6	Real Huarcos	0–3 (w.o.)	0–3 (w.o.)
Amazonas FC	3–4	Cachorro	3–2	0–2
Deportivo Municipal (Palcazú)	5–7	Deportivo Tumi	5–1	0–6
Juventud Bellavista	5–2	Grandez	2–1	3–1
Independiente Zorritos	1–6	Sport River	1–5	0–1
El Inca	2–2 (4–5 p)	ASA	1–0	1–2
Real Puerto Chimbote	5–5 (5–4 p)	Colegio Comercio	4–0	1–5
Alianza Tres Unidos	1–3	Bagua FC	1–1	0–2
Atlético Nacional	2–2 (2–4 p)	Atlético Torino	1–0	1–2
Defensor Balsapuerto	3–4	ADA Cajabamba	3–2	0–2
AD Tahuishco	4–3	Jibaja Che	4–0	0–3
América de Tepo	6–1	Sport Ayash Huamanin	3–1	3–0
Deportivo Municipal (Chacos)	1–3	Unión Minas	1–0	0–3
Las Palmas	5–2	Nihue Rao	3–0	2–2
Estudiantes de Chancay	3–5	UNT	3–2	0–3

==== Zona Sur ====
Team 1	Agg.	Team 2	1st leg	2nd leg
Atlético Suma Motors	2–4	ANBA Perú	2–1	0–3^{[A]}
Sport Puerto Aéreo	4–5	Atlético Chanchamayo	4–2	0–3
Diablos Rojos	3–2	Unión Juventud Pomacocha	2–1	1–1
Colegio Nacional Billinghurst	1–8	Alianza Pisco	1–2	0–6
Cultural Huancarama	14–3	La Masía Nace	7–1	7–2
Barrio 12	3–2	Deportivo Múnich Sol Naciente	3–1	0–1
San Martín Tours	2–1	Intituto Apurímac	0–0	2–1
Señor Justo Juez	2–3	Calidad Porteña	1–0	1–3
Dínamo de Solabaya	1–3	Sport Machete	0–0	1–3
Hacienda San Agustín	2–1	Hijos del Altiplano y del Pacífico	1–0	1–1
Juventud Ccontacc	2–2 (2–4 p)	UNISPA	2–0	0–2
FD Galaxy	0–5	Defensor Patibamba	0–1	0–4
FC Tambo	3–5	Viargoca	3–2	0–3
Hijos de Piscobamba	1–3	Juventud Huracán	0–0	1–3
Illanes 48 Llallahua	1–1 (2–4 p)	Amigos de la PNP	1–0	0–1
Señor de Quinuapata	3–1	Real Sociedad	2–0	1–1

==== Footnotes ====
A. The match was tied 2–2. However, in the 81st minute the Suma Motors players assaulted the referee after being reduced to only 9 players, which led to the Suma Motors team being expelled from the tournament.

=== Round of 32 ===
==== Zona Norte ====
Team 1	Agg.	Team 2	1st leg	2nd leg
Miguel Grau UDH	0–0 (3–4 p)	Real Huarcos	0–0	0–0
Cachorro	1–0	Deportivo Tumi	0–0	1–0
Juventud Bellavista	1–5	Sport River	0–1	1–4
ASA	4–2	Real Puerto Chimbote	2–0	2–2
Bagua FC	1–2	Atlético Torino	0–0	1–2
ADA Cajabamba	6–6 (3–4 p)	AD Tahuishco	5–2	1–4
América de Tepo	2–2 (1–3 p)	Unión Minas	2–0	0–2
Las Palmas	4–6	UNT	4–3	0–3

==== Zona Sur ====
Team 1	Agg.	Team 2	1st leg	2nd leg
ANBA Perú	6–2	Atlético Chanchamayo	4–2	2–0
Diablos Rojos	3–1	Alianza Pisco	2–0	1–1
Cultural Huancarama	8–0	Barrio 12	4–0	4–0
San Martín Tours	4–1	Calidad Porteña	3–1	1–0
Sport Machete	6–5	Hacienda San Agustín	4–2	2–3
UNISPA	1–1 (4–5 p)	Defensor Patibamba	1–0	0–1
Viargoca	2–5	Juventud Huracán	1–1	1–4
Amigos de la PNP	7–1	Señor de Quinuapata	6–0	1–1

=== Round of 16 ===
==== Zona Norte ====
Team 1	Agg.	Team 2	1st leg	2nd leg
Real Huarcos	4–4 (4–5 p)	Cachorro	4–2	0–2
Sport River	1–1 (1–4 p)	ASA	1–0	0–1
Atlético Torino	0–1	AD Tahuishco	0–0	0–1
Unión Minas	4–3	UNT	4–0	0–3

==== Zona Sur ====
Team 1	Agg.	Team 2	1st leg	2nd leg
ANBA Perú	5–0	Diablos Rojos	3–0	2–0
Cultural Huancarama	5–4	San Martín Tours	4–0	1–4
Sport Machete	5–5 (5–6 p)	Defensor Patibamba	3–2	2–3
Juventud Huracán	3–1	Amigos de la PNP	2–0	1–1

=== Quarterfinals ===
==== Zona Norte ====
Team 1	Agg.	Team 2	1st leg	2nd leg
Cachorro	0–5	ASA	0–2	0–3
AD Tahuishco	2–4	Unión Minas	2–0	0–4

==== Zona Sur ====
Team 1	Agg.	Team 2	1st leg	2nd leg
ANBA Perú	4–1	Cultural Huancarama	4–1	0–0
Defensor Patibamba	0–2	Juventud Huracán	0–0	0–2

=== Semifinals ===
9 November 2025	ASA	0–3^{[B]}	Unión Minas	Hugo Sotil, Lima
11:00				Referee: Jordi Espinoza

9 November 2025	ANBA Perú	2–2 (4–3 p)	Juventud Huracán	Hugo Sotil, Lima
15:00	Alberto Vela 7' (pen.); Carlos Bellota 27'		Jairo Chaupis 57'; Kevin Carazas 78'	Referee: Pablo López
	Penalties
	Pedro Zúñiga (penalty scored); Gerardo Cabanillas (penalty scored); Jhan Cumbicus (penalty scored); Jorge Blanco (penalty scored)		Ayrton Mazzo (penalty scored); Alvaro Olaya (penalty scored); Mauro Arequipeño (penalty missed); Carlos Quevedo (penalty scored); Kevin Carazas (penalty missed)

==== Footnotes ====
B. The original match was tied 1–1.

=== Final ===
The winning team promoted to Liga 2 for the 2026 season.

16 November 2025	Unión Minas	0–0 (5–4 p)	ANBA Perú	Hugo Sotil, Lima
14:30				Referee: Augusto Menendez
	Penalties
	Minzum Quina (penalty scored); John Barrueta (penalty scored); Brayan Ormeño (penalty scored); Rodrigo Cangahuala (penalty scored); Eduardo Chávez (penalty scored)		Pedro Zuñiga (penalty scored); Gerardo Cabanillas (penalty scored); Elvis Luque (penalty missed); Diego Angles (penalty scored); Alberto Vela (penalty scored)

== Play-off de Ascenso ==
The winning team promoted to Liga 2 for the 2026 season.

23 November 2025	Estudiantil CNI	2–1	ANBA Perú	Max Augustín, Iquitos
15:00	Élver Torres 43' 45+5'		Alberto Vela 55'	Referee: Jordi Espinoza

30 November 2025	ANBA Perú	2–1 (2–4 p)	Estudiantil CNI	Guillermo Briceño Rosamedina, Juliaca
15:00	Renny Luque 9'; Alberto Vela 45+1' (pen.)		Pablo Labrín 89'
	Penalties
	Pedro Zúñiga (penalty scored); Renny Luque (penalty missed); Sait Ballesteros (penalty scored); Jorge Blanco (penalty missed)		Pablo Labrín (penalty scored); José Luis García (penalty scored); Ronald Rios (penalty scored); Antonio Acosta (penalty scored)

== Aggregate table ==
Pos	Team	Pld	W	D	L	GF	GA	GD	Pts	Qualification or Relegation
1	Unión Minas (C)	10	5	1	4	16	8	+8	16	2026 Liga 2
2	ANBA Perú	10	6	3	1	21	7	+14	21	2026 Liga 3
3	Juventud Huracán	9	4	5	0	15	6	+9	17	2026 Liga 3
4	ASA	9	4	2	3	12	8	+4	14	2026 Liga 3
5	Cultural Huancarama	8	5	1	2	28	11	+17	16	Ligas Distritales
6	Defensor Patibamba	8	4	1	3	11	8	+3	13	Ligas Distritales
7	AD Tahuishco	8	4	1	3	13	13	0	13	2026 Liga 3
8	Cachorro	8	3	1	4	9	12	−3	10	Ligas Distritales
9	Sport River	6	5	0	1	12	3	+9	15	Ligas Distritales
10	San Martín Tours	6	4	1	1	10	7	+3	13	Ligas Distritales
11	Real Huarcos	6	3	2	1	10	4	+6	11	Ligas Distritales
12	Sport Machete	6	3	1	2	14	11	+3	10	Ligas Distritales
13	UNT	6	3	0	3	14	11	+3	9	Ligas Distritales
14	Amigos de la PNP	6	2	2	2	9	5	+4	8	Ligas Distritales
15	Atlético Torino	6	2	2	2	4	4	0	8	Ligas Distritales
16	Diablos Rojos	6	2	2	2	6	8	−2	8	Ligas Distritales
17	América de Tepo	4	3	0	1	8	3	+5	9	Ligas Distritales
18	Miguel Grau UDH	4	2	2	0	5	2	+3	8	Ligas Distritales
19	Alianza Pisco	4	2	1	1	9	4	+5	7	Ligas Distritales
20	Las Palmas	4	2	1	1	9	8	+1	7	Ligas Distritales
21	Hacienda San Agustín	4	2	1	1	7	7	0	7	Ligas Distritales
22	Juventud Bellavista	4	2	0	2	6	7	−1	6	Ligas Distritales
23	ADA Cajabamba	4	2	0	2	10	9	+1	6	Ligas Distritales
24	UNISPA	4	2	0	2	3	3	0	6	Ligas Distritales
25	Bagua FC	4	1	2	1	4	3	+1	5	Ligas Distritales
26	Señor de Quinuapata	4	1	2	1	4	8	−4	5	Ligas Distritales
27	Deportivo Tumi	4	1	1	2	7	6	+1	4	Ligas Distritales
28	Viargoca	4	1	1	2	7	8	−1	4	Ligas Distritales
29	Real Puerto Chimbote	4	1	1	2	7	9	−2	4	Ligas Distritales
30	Calidad Porteña	4	1	0	3	4	6	−2	3	Ligas Distritales
31	Atlético Chanchamayo	4	1	0	3	7	10	−3	3	Ligas Distritales
32	Barrio 12	4	1	0	3	3	10	−7	3	Ligas Distritales
33	Colegio Comercio	2	1	0	1	5	5	0	3	Ligas Distritales
34	Atlético Nacional	2	1	0	1	2	2	0	3	Ligas Distritales
35	El Inca	2	1	0	1	2	2	0	3	Ligas Distritales
36	Juventud Ccontacc	2	1	0	1	2	2	0	3	Ligas Distritales
37	Illanes 48 Llallahua	2	1	0	1	1	1	0	3	Ligas Distritales
38	Sport Puerto Aéreo	2	1	0	1	4	5	−1	3	Ligas Distritales
39	Amazonas FC	2	1	0	1	3	4	−1	3	Ligas Distritales
40	Defensor Balsapuerto	2	1	0	1	3	4	−1	3	Ligas Distritales
41	Jibaja Che	2	1	0	1	3	4	−1	3	Ligas Distritales
42	Deportivo Múnich Sol Naciente	2	1	0	1	2	3	−1	3	Ligas Distritales
43	Señor Justo Juez	2	1	0	1	2	3	−1	3	Ligas Distritales
44	Deportivo Municipal (Palcazú)	2	1	0	1	5	7	−2	3	Ligas Distritales
45	Estudiantes de Chancay	2	1	0	1	3	5	−2	3	Ligas Distritales
46	FC Tambo	2	1	0	1	3	5	−2	3	Ligas Distritales
47	Atlético Suma Motors	2	1	0	1	2	4	−2	3	Ligas Distritales
48	Deportivo Municipal (Chacos)	2	1	0	1	1	3	−2	3	Ligas Distritales
49	Unión Juventud Pomacocha	2	0	1	1	2	3	−1	1	Ligas Distritales
50	Hijos del Altiplano y del Pacífico	2	0	1	1	1	2	−1	1	Ligas Distritales
51	Instituto Apurímac	2	0	1	1	1	2	−1	1	Ligas Distritales
52	Alianza Tres Unidos	2	0	1	1	1	3	−2	1	Ligas Distritales
53	Hijos de Piscobamba	2	0	1	1	1	3	−2	1	Ligas Distritales
54	Dínamo de Solabaya	2	0	1	1	1	3	−2	1	Ligas Distritales
55	Real Sociedad	2	0	1	1	1	3	−2	1	Ligas Distritales
56	Nihue Rao	2	0	1	1	2	5	−3	1	Ligas Distritales
57	Grandez	2	0	0	2	2	5	−3	0	Ligas Distritales
58	Real Independiente	2	0	0	2	2	5	−3	0	Ligas Distritales
59	Independiente Zorritos	2	0	0	2	1	6	−5	0	Ligas Distritales
60	Sport Ayash Huamanin	2	0	0	2	1	6	−5	0	Ligas Distritales
61	FD Galaxy	2	0	0	2	0	5	−5	0	Ligas Distritales
62	Colegio Nacional Billinghurst	2	0	0	2	1	8	−7	0	Ligas Distritales
63	La Masía Nace	2	0	0	2	3	14	−11	0	Ligas Distritales
64	León de Huánuco	2	0	0	2	0	6	−6	0	Disqualified

Updated to match(es) played on September 2025. Source:
Rules for classification: 1) points; 2) goal difference; 3) number of goals scored; 4) head-to-head record; 5) drawing of lots
(C) Champions

== See also ==
- 2025 Liga 1
- 2025 Liga 2
- 2025 Liga 3
- 2025 Ligas Departamentales del Perú
