= 2026 Liga 2 (Peru) =

Liga 2 Caliente
- Season: 2026
- Dates: 27 March – 9 December 2026
- Relegated: Binacional; San Marcos
- Top goalscorer: Mathías López (11 goals)
- Biggest home win: Deportivo Llacuabamba 3–0 Carlos A. Mannucci (29 March)
- Biggest away win: San Marcos 0–3 Unión Comercio (27 March)
- Highest scoring: Comerciantes 3–2 Sport Huancayo II (29 March)

The 2026 Liga 2 (known as the Liga 2 Caliente 2026 for sponsorship reasons) is the 74th edition of the second tier of Federación Peruana de Futbol.

On April 16, 2026, San Marcos issued a statement announcing its voluntary withdrawal from the current season of the Liga 2, due to economic and financial difficulties that prevent it from continuing its participation in the promotion tournament.

== Competition format ==
Regional Stage

The tournament is played in groups based on the geographical distribution of the teams. Each group has 9 teams, which are divided into Group 1 and Group 2 respectively, where they play each other in a double round-robin format (home and away), for a total of 18 matchdays.

Group Stage

The top six teams from Group 1 and Group 2 will qualify for the next stage, known as the Final Phase. In this stage, three Championship Groups will be formed, each consisting of four teams.

At the start of these groups, the teams that finished first in each group, along with the best second-placed team, will begin with 2 additional points. Meanwhile, the other second-placed team and the teams that finished in third place will start with 1 additional point. Each group will play a total of six matchdays.

As for the remaining teams, they will be distributed into two triangular groups. In this phase, the teams that finished in ninth place in each group will start with a 1-point deduction.

Promotion Playoffs

The champion and the winner of the repechage (playoff) who will be promoted will be determined. This stage is divided into three rounds:

- Semifinals:

The three teams that finished first in the previous phase, along with the best second-placed team, will face each other in two-legged ties (home and away). The winners of these ties will qualify for the final, while the other two teams will play in a repechage.

- Final and Repechage:

Matches will be played over two legs, with the higher-ranked team from the previous phase hosting the second leg:

Repechage: Loser 1 vs. Loser 2 Final (Champion): Winner 1 vs. Winner 2

The champion will be promoted to Liga1 2027, while the loser of the final will play an additional series against the winner of the repechage.

- Runner-up Playoff:

This will be played as a single match, hosted by the losing team from the final:

Final loser vs. Repechage winner

The winner of this match will earn the second promotion spot and join the champion in Liga1 2027. In case of a draw, the winner will be decided by a penalty shootout.

== Teams ==
The following teams have changed division since the 2025 season:

=== Team changes ===
Promoted from 2025 Liga 3	Promoted from 2025 Copa Perú	Relegated from 2025 Liga 1	Promoted to 2026 Liga 1	Relegated to 2026 Liga 3
▲ Sport Huancayo II (1st) ▲ Estudiantil CNI (2nd)	▲ Unión Minas (1st)	▼ Ayacucho (17th) ▼ Alianza Universidad (18th) ▼ Binacional (Disqualified)	▲ Cajamarca (1st) ▲ Deportivo Moquegua (2nd)	▼ Deportivo Coopsol (15th)

=== Stadia and locations ===
Locations of the 2026 Liga 2 teams

Team	City	Stadium	Capacity
Academia Cantolao	Callao	Miguel Grau	17,000
ADA	Jaén	Víctor Montoya Segura	9,000
Alianza Universidad	Huánuco	Heraclio Tapia	25,000
Ayacucho	Ayacucho	Las Américas	6,400
Bentín Tacna Heroica	Tacna	Jorge Basadre	19,850
Binacional	Juliaca	Guillermo Briceño Rosamedina	20,030
Carlos A. Mannucci	Trujillo	Mansiche	25,036
Comerciantes	Iquitos	Max Augustín	24,576
Deportivo Llacuabamba	Huamachuco	Municipal de Huamachuco	5,000
Estudiantil CNI	Iquitos	Max Augustín	24,576
Pirata	Chongoyape	Municipal de la Juventud	2,500
San Marcos	Huaraz	Rosas Pampa	18,000
Santos	Nazca	Municipal de Nasca	10,000
Sport Huancayo II	Huancayo	Huancayo	20,000
Unión Comercio	Tarapoto	Carlos Vidaurre García	7,000
Unión Minas	Cerro de Pasco	Daniel Alcides Carrión	12,000
Universidad César Vallejo	Trujillo	César Acuña Peralta	2,000
Universidad San Martín	Lima	Villa Deportiva USMP	1,249

== Regional Stage ==
=== Group 1 ===
Pos	Team	Pld	W	D	L	GF	GA	GD	Pts	Qualification	UCO	CAM	LLA	PIR	USM	ADA	UCV	CAN	SMA
1	Unión Comercio	16	9	5	2	19	5	+14	32	Advance to Group stage		0–0	0–0	1–2	1–0	1–0	1–0	4–0	3–0
2	Carlos A. Mannucci	16	9	3	4	22	12	+10	30	Advance to Group stage	0–0		1–0	1–0	2–1	2–0	0–1	2–0	3–0
3	Deportivo Llacuabamba	16	8	4	4	23	10	+13	28	Advance to Group stage	1–1	3–0		0–0	3–0	1–0	2–0	3–0	3–0
4	Pirata	16	7	4	5	25	20	+5	25	Advance to Group stage	1–2	2–4	3–1		3–2	0–1	2–1	2–1	3–0
5	Universidad San Martín	16	7	3	6	26	17	+9	24	Advance to Group stage	0–1	2–0	0–1	1–1		3–1	2–0	2–2	3–0
6	ADA	16	6	6	4	17	12	+5	24	Advance to Group stage	1–0	0–0	0–0	3–1	2–2		1–1	1–1	3–0
7	Universidad César Vallejo	16	6	4	6	17	13	+4	22	Qualification for Relegation group	0–0	2–0	2–0	1–1	0–1	0–1		2–1	3–0
8	Academia Cantolao	16	3	5	8	19	30	−11	14	Qualification for Relegation group	0–1	1–4	3–2	1–1	0–4	0–0	1–1		5–1
9	San Marcos (D, R)	16	0	0	16	1	50	−49	0	Disqualified from the competition	0–3	0–3	0–3	0–3	0–3	0–3	0–3	0–3	

Updated to match(es) played on 13 september 2026. Source:
Legend: Blue = home team win; Yellow = draw; Red = away team win.
(D) Disqualified; (R) Relegated

=== Group 2 ===
Pos	Team	Pld	W	D	L	GF	GA	GD	Pts	Qualification	CFC	BEN	UMI	SHU	AUH	AYA	SAN	CNI	BIN
1	Comerciantes	16	6	8	2	24	15	+9	26	Advance to Group stage		2–2	2–2	3–2	1–0	5–1	1–0	1–1	3–0
2	Bentín Tacna Heroica	16	7	5	4	20	16	+4	26	Advance to Group stage	1–1		2–1	1–0	0–0	0–3	3–1	3–1	2–1
3	Unión Minas	16	6	7	3	25	12	+13	25	Advance to Group stage	0–0	0–0		2–1	0–1	3–1	2–0	3–0	0–0
4	Sport Huancayo II	16	7	3	6	21	15	+6	24	Advance to Group stage	1–1	2–0	1–0		0–3	0–0	2–0	1–0	7–0
5	Alianza Universidad	16	6	5	5	20	17	+3	23	Advance to Group stage	1–2	1–0	1–1	1–1		3–2	1–2	2–0	1–2
6	Ayacucho	16	6	4	6	22	19	+3	22	Advance to Group stage	0–0	0–1	2–2	0–2	0–2		2–0	1–0	7–1
7	Santos	16	6	3	7	19	22	−3	21	Qualification for Relegation group	1–0	2–1	0–1	2–0	3–3	0–0		4–1	3–1
8	Estudiantil CNI	16	4	5	7	25	21	+4	17	Qualification for Relegation group	2–2	1–1	0–0	2–0	3–0	0–1	3–0		9–0
9	Binacional	16	2	4	10	10	49	−39	10	Qualification for Relegation group	1–0	0–3	1–8	0–1	0–0	0–2	1–1	2–2	

Updated to match(es) played on 12 september 2026. Source:
Legend: Blue = home team win; Yellow = draw; Red = away team win.

== Group stage ==
=== Group A ===
Pos	Team	Pld	W	D	L	GF	GA	GD	Pts	Qualification	UCO	AYA	PIR	UMI
1	Unión Comercio	6	2	2	2	12	9	+3	10 (Note: Awarded 2 points for finishing first in Group 1.)	Advance to semi-finals		5–0	2–0	3–3
2	Ayacucho	6	3	1	2	7	11	−4	10		1–1		3–2	1–0
3	Pirata	6	3	0	3	6	9	−3	9		1–0	2–0		1–0
4	Unión Minas	6	2	1	3	12	8	+4	8 (Note: Awarded 1 point for finishing third in Group 2.)		4–1	1–2	4–0	

Updated to match(es) played on 1 November 2026. Source:
Legend: Blue = home team win; Yellow = draw; Red = away team win.

=== Group B ===
Pos	Team	Pld	W	D	L	GF	GA	GD	Pts	Qualification	ADA	LLA	SHU	CFC
1	ADA	6	3	2	1	9	3	+6	11	Advance to semi-finals		0–0	5–1	0–1
2	Deportivo Llacuabamba	6	2	3	1	8	4	+4	10 (Note: Awarded 1 point for finishing third in Group 1.)		1–1		1–2	4–0
3	Sport Huancayo II	6	2	2	2	6	9	−3	8		0–1	0–0		2–2
4	Comerciantes	6	1	1	4	4	11	−7	6 (Note: Awarded 2 points for finishing first in Group 2.)		0–2	1–2	0–1	

Updated to match(es) played on 1 November 2026. Source:
Legend: Blue = home team win; Yellow = draw; Red = away team win.

=== Group C ===
Pos	Team	Pld	W	D	L	GF	GA	GD	Pts	Qualification	CAM	USM	BEN	AUH
1	Carlos A. Mannucci	6	3	3	0	15	5	+10	14 (Note: Awarded 2 points for finishing as the best runner-up.)	Advance to semi-finals		7–0	2–2	3–1
2	Universidad San Martín	6	4	0	2	8	11	−3	12	Advance to semi-finals	1–2		2–0	2–1
3	Bentín Tacna Heroica	6	1	3	2	6	8	−2	7 (Note: Awarded 1 point for finishing second in Group 2.)		0–0	1–2		1–0
4	Alianza Universidad	6	0	2	4	5	10	−5	2		1–1	0–1	2–2	

Updated to match(es) played on 1 November 2026. Source:
Legend: Blue = home team win; Yellow = draw; Red = away team win.

== Play-offs ==
Semi-finals
1A	Unión Comercio	1	0	1
2C	Universidad San Martín	1	1	2
1C	Carlos A. Mannucci	0
1B	ADA	0

Final & Repechaje
Repechaje
Final
Universidad San Martín

2nd place match

=== Semi-finals ===
==== First leg ====
14 November 2026
15:30

ADA	0–0	Carlos A. Mannucci

Víctor Montoya Segura, Jaén
Referee: Sebastián Lozano
15 November 2026
10:45

Universidad San Martín	1–1	Unión Comercio
Carlos López 45+3' (pen.)		Breidy Goluz 68'

Villa Deportiva USMP, Lima
Referee: Daniel Ureta

==== Second leg ====
22 November 2026
15:00

Unión Comercio	0–1	Universidad San Martín
		Otavio Gut 10'

Estadio Carlos Vidaurre García, Tarapoto
22 November 2026
19:30

Carlos A. Mannucci	–	ADA

Estadio Mansiche, Trujillo

=== Repechaje ===
November 2026

–

November 2026

–

=== Final ===
November 2026

Universidad San Martín	–

November 2026

–	Universidad San Martín

=== 2nd Place Match ===
November 2026

–

November 2026

–

== Relegation group ==
=== Group A ===
Pos	Team	Pld	W	D	L	GF	GA	GD	Pts	Qualification	UCV	CNI	SMA
1	Universidad César Vallejo	4	3	1	0	11	4	+7	10			2–1	3–0
2	Estudiantil CNI	4	2	1	1	10	5	+5	7		3–3		3–0
3	San Marcos (R)	4	0	0	4	0	12	−12	−1 (Note: 1-point deduction (-1) for finishing bottom of Group 1.)	Retired. Relegation to 2027 Liga 3	0–3	0–3	

Updated to match(es) played on 26 October 2026. Source:
Legend: Blue = home team win; Yellow = draw; Red = away team win.
(R) Relegated

=== Group B ===
Pos	Team	Pld	W	D	L	GF	GA	GD	Pts		SAN	CAN	BIN
1	Santos	4	3	1	0	10	2	+8	10			1–1	4–0
2	Academia Cantolao	4	1	2	1	11	6	+5	5		0–3		8–0
3	Binacional (R)	4	0	1	3	3	16	−13	0 (Note: 1-point deduction (-1) for finishing bottom of Group 2.)	Relegation to 2027 Liga 3	1–2	2–2	

Updated to match(es) played on 31 October 2026. Source:
Legend: Blue = home team win; Yellow = draw; Red = away team win.
(R) Relegated

== Top scorers ==
As of 16 November 2026

Rank	Player	Club	Goals
1	(Uruguay) Mathías López	Bentín Tacna Heroica	11
1	(Colombia) Breidy Golúz	Unión Comercio	11
1	(Uruguay) Maximiliano Lemos	Comerciantes FC	11
4	(Argentina) Pablo Bueno	Estudiantil CNI	10
5	(Colombia) Kevin Lugo	Pirata FC	9
6	(Colombia) Víctor Perlaza	Comerciantes FC	8
7	(Peru) Alexis Rojas	Santos FC	7
7	(Argentina) Maximiliano Zárate	Deportivo Lacuabamba	7
7	(Peru) Austing Arteaga	Universidad San Martín	7
7	(Argentina) Gustavo Pereira	Unión Minas	7
7	(Colombia) Diego Cuadros	Estudiantil CNI	7
7	(Peru) Jorginho Sernaqué	Alianza Universidad	7
7	(Peru) Santiago Torres	Santos FC	7

== See also ==
- 2026 Copa de la Liga
- 2026 Liga 1
- 2026 Liga 3
- 2026 Copa Perú
- 2026 Tradición Copera
- 2026 Ligas Departamentales del Perú
- 2026 Liga Femenina
- 2026 Liga Nacional Juvenil FPF
