= Liga 3 (Peru) =

Peruvian Tercera División
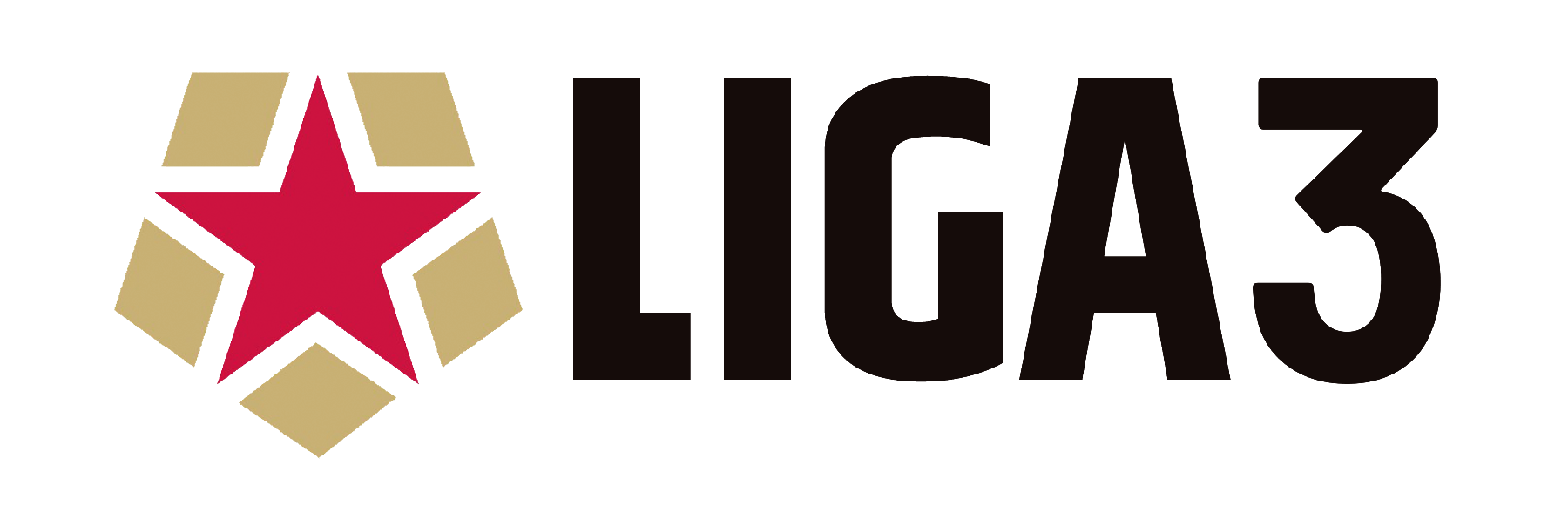
- Organising body: FPF
- Founded: 2025; 1 year ago
- First season: 2025
- Country: Peru
- Confederation: CONMEBOL
- Number of clubs: 36
- Level on pyramid: 3
- Promotion to: Liga 2
- Relegation to: Copa Perú
- Current champions: Sport Huancayo II (1st title) (2025)
- Most championships: Sport Huancayo II (1 title)
- Current: 2026 season

Liga 3 is the third-highest division in the Peruvian football league system. It is a semi-professional and promotional division organized by the Peruvian Football Federation since 2025. The Liga 3 is contested by 37 teams, with promotion to the Liga 2 and relegation to the Copa Perú.

== History ==
The idea of a third division was discussed by the Peruvian Football Federation in 2019. The president of the National Amateur Football Commission, Luis Duarte Plata, had planned to replace Copa Perú with the Liga 3 and hold the last edition in 2020; the 25 departamental champions would participate in the first edition of Liga 3 in 2021. However, the FPF decided to cancel the 2020 edition of the Copa Perú during the District Stage due to the COVID-19 pandemic.

In 2022, the FPF, through the National Subcommission of Amateur Football, decided to reconsider the idea of a new league that would be the first step towards professionalization for clubs coming from the Copa Perú. This idea was embodied by President Agustín Lozano through the "reforms of Peruvian football", which would have as their first important change the elimination of promotion to the Liga 1 from the Copa Perú.

Between the end of 2023 and the beginning of 2024, the creation of Liga 3 was a request and requirement established by FIFA. The creation of the third division means that the Copa Perú will be moved down tier. In 2024, the FPF, taking into account CONMEBOL's observations, then decided that the Copa Perú would be the tournament that decides the participants in a meritorious manner, based on the original idea from years ago: the 25 representatives of each department that are best placed in the final table of the 2024 Copa Perú's National Stage, whether the departmental champion or runner-up and except for those promoted to Liga 2, will be the clubs that will play the first edition of Liga 3 in the year 2025.

== Division levels ==
Year	Level	Promotion to	Relegation to
2025–present	3	Liga 2	Copa Perú Ligas Departamentales Ligas Provinciales Ligas Distritales

== Competition format and sponsorship ==
36 teams take part in the Liga 3. The tournament is split into three stages, the Regional Stage, Second Stage, and the Play-offs. In the Regional Stage, the 36 teams are split into four groups of nine based on geographical location. The top four of each group will advance to the Second Stage while the bottom team in each group will be relegated to the Copa Perú. In the Second Stage, the 16 teams will be split into four groups of four. The top two of each group will advance to the Playoffs quarter-finals. The finalists of the Play-offs will be promoted to the Liga 2.

The top three teams in the National Stage of the Copa Perú, along with the champions of the Torneo Juvenil Sub-18 will be promoted to the Liga 3. However, reserve teams will be unable to play in the same division as their first teams, being restricted promotion and always being kept one division separate from their first team. Two teams from the Liga 3 also be invited to the Copa LFP - FPF, based on historic popularity.

=== Sponsorship ===
The Liga 3 is currently sponsored by the Spanish clothing brand company, Joma. Joma acquired naming rights in 2025, with the leagues official sponsorship name being "Liga 3 Joma".

== Clubs ==
Initially, it had been planned that 32 teams will participate in the Liga 3. However, after the administrative relegation of Unión Huaral and Juan Aurich, from the 2024 Liga 2 at the beginning of the season, in addition to the increase to eight of the qualifiers since the 2024 Torneo de Promoción y Reserva, this number was expanded to 36.

=== Stadia and locations ===
Locations of the 2026 Liga 3 teams

Team	City	Stadium	Capacity
ADT II	Tarma	Unión Tarma	9,100
AD Tahuishco	Moyobamba	IPD de Moyobamba	8,000
Alianza Lima II	Lima	Hugo Sotil	13,773
Amazon Callao	Callao	Campolo Alcalde	3,000
ANBA Perú	Juliaca	Guillermo Briceño Rosamedina	20,030
ASA	Chancay	Rómulo Shaw Cisneros	3,000
Carlos Stein	Negritos	Wilberto Herrera Carlín	3,000
Centro Social Pariacoto	Casma	Valeriano López	2,000
Cienciano II	Calca	Thomas Ernesto Payne	8,000
Corazón de León – AR	Yauri	Municipal de Espinar	16,000
Cultural Volante	Bambamarca	Municipal El Frutillo	5,000
Deportivo Coopsol	Chancay	Rómulo Shaw Cisneros	3,000
Deportivo Lute	Lambayeque	César Flores Marigorda	7,000
Deportivo Municipal (Pangoa)	Satipo	Municipal de Mazamari	5,000
Deportivo Ucrania	Nueva Cajamarca	IPD de Nueva Cajamarca	12,000
Ecosem Pasco	Cerro de Pasco	Daniel Alcides Carrión	12,000
Juan Aurich	Chiclayo	Elías Aguirre	24,000
Juventud Cautivo	Sullana	Campeones del 36	12,000
Juventud Huracán	Supe	Edgardo Reyes Bolívar	2,000
Juventud Santo Domingo	Nazca	Municipal de Nasca	10,000
Juventus	Huamachuco	Municipal de Huamachuco	5,000
Melgar II	Arequipa	CAR - FBC Melgar	–
Nacional	Mollendo	Municipal de Mollendo	5,000
Nuevo San Cristóbal	Kimbiri	Municipal de Kimbiri	5,000
Pacífico	Huacho	Segundo Aranda Torres	11,500
Patriotas	Tacna	Jorge Basadre	19,850
Sport Boys II	Callao	Campolo Alcalde	2,000
Sporting Company	Arequipa	25 de Noviembre	–
Sporting Cristal II	Lima	La Florida	–
Ucayali	Pucallpa	Aliardo Soria Pérez	25,848
UDA	Huancavelica	IPD de Huancavelica	8,500
Unión Huaral	Huaral	Julio Lores Colán	6,000
Unión Santo Domingo	Chachapoyas	Gran Kuélap	1,000
Universidad César Vallejo II	Trujillo	César Acuña Peralta	2,000
Universitario II	Lima	Campo Mar - U	–
Valle Sagrado	Calca	Thomas Ernesto Payne	8,000

== Champions ==
Ed.	Season	Champion	Runner-up	Third place	Winning manager	Leading goalscorer(s)
1	2025	Sport Huancayo II (1)	Estudiantil CNI	Universitario II	(Paraguay) Pedro Garay	(Peru) Juan Martínez (Sport Huancayo II; 18 goals)
2	2026					

== Titles by club ==
Rank	Club	Winners	Runners-up	Winning years	Runners-up years
1	Sport Huancayo II	1	—	2025	—

== Titles by region ==
Region	Nº of titles	Clubs
(Junín Region) Junín	1	Sport Huancayo II (1)

== See also ==
- Football in Peru
- Peruvian football league system
- Peruvian Football Federation
- Peruvian football league system
  - Liga 1
  - Liga 2
  - Copa Perú
  - Ligas Departamentales del Peru
  - Ligas Provinciales del Peru
  - Ligas Distritales del Peru
