= Football in Peru =

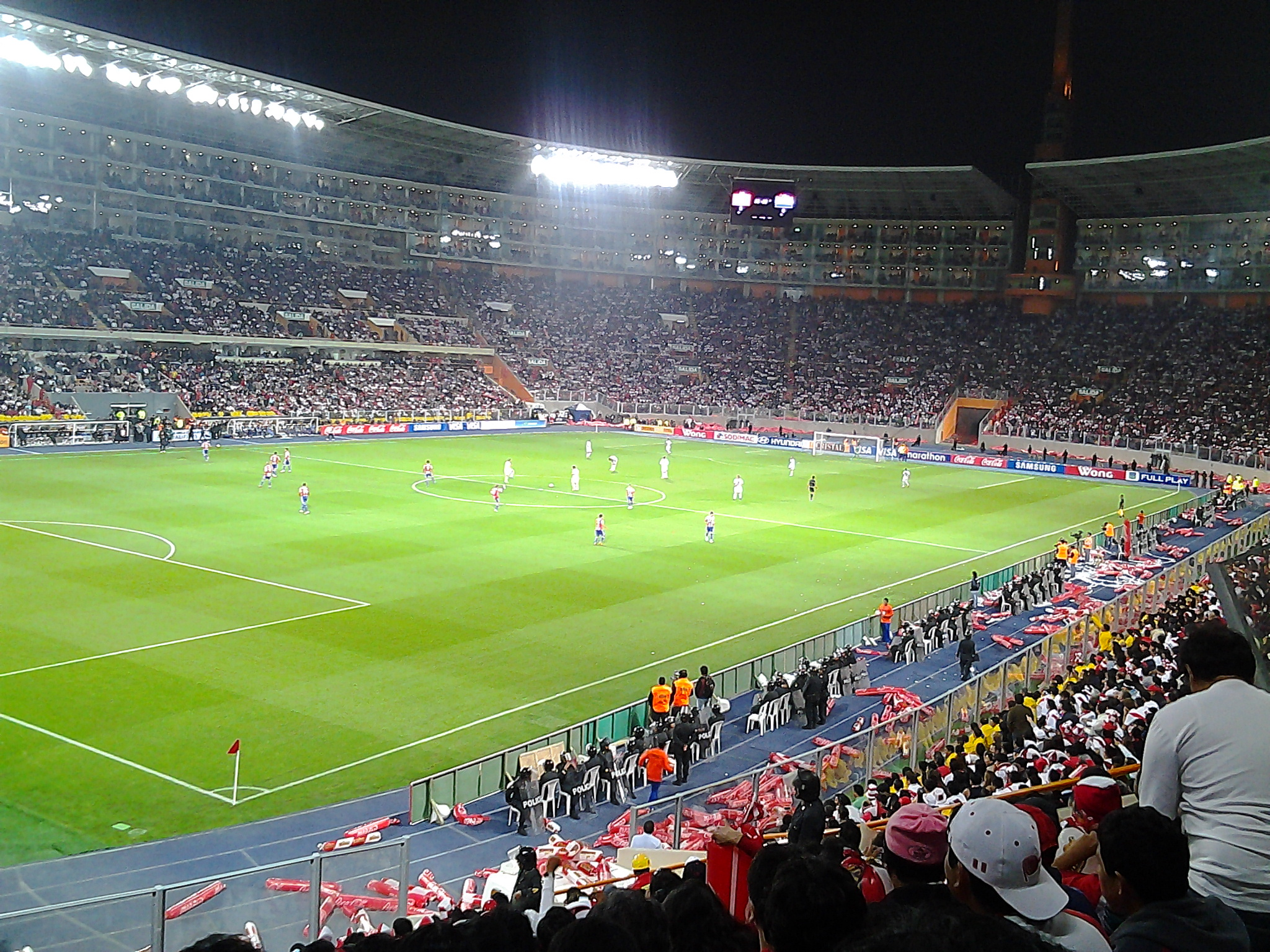
- The Estadio Nacional in a match between Peru and Paraguay in 2011
- Country: Peru
- Governing body: FPF
- National team: Peru
- First played: 1867; 159 years ago

National competitions
- FIFA World Cup; Copa América

Club competitions
- List: League: Liga 1 Liga 2 Liga 3 Copa Perú Ligas Departamentales Ligas Provinciales Ligas Distritales; Cups: Copa LFP - FPF Supercopa Peruana

International competitions
- FIFA Club World Cup; Copa Libertadores; Copa Sudamericana

Football is the most popular sport in Peru. According to a survey, 77.3% of Peruvians were interested in the 2022 FIFA World Cup, demonstrating the country's strong passion for football.

Football in Peru was introduced by British immigrants, Peruvians returning from Great Britain, and by English sailors in the later half of the 19th century during their frequent stops at the port of Callao, which at that point was considered one of the most important ports of the Pacific Ocean.

== Introduction of football in Peru (19th century) ==
Lima is home to an important sporting institution, it was founded in 1845 by English immigrants as Salon de Comercio, renamed in 1859 as the Lima Cricket Club, and was based around the sports of cricket, rugby, and football, the club underwent many other name changes such as in 1865 to Lima Cricket and Lawn Tennis Club and in 1906 to Lima Cricket and Football Club. During the War of the Pacific (1879 - 1883), the destruction of various Peruvian towns and cities, including the raid of Lima, brought the spread of sport in Peru to a momentary stop. The oldest football records are found for a Callao vs. Lima match on August 7, 1892, and an Englishmen vs. Peruvian match on June 24, 1894.

== Amateur era (Early 20th century) ==
After the war, the sports rivalry that evolved between the foreigners and the Chalacos began to gain much attention from people elsewhere. As a result, the popularity of the sport eventually extended to Lima, and even though at first the sport was played without the formality of sports clubs, a few clubs were eventually created in order to continue its practice in the early 20th century. Among these early clubs of the amateur era were the English community's Lima Cricket Club founded in 1859 although it is unclear when they first played football, their oldest recorded match having been played on August 7, 1892. They were followed by the Peruvian Ciclista Lima Association (Lima, 1896), and Atlético Chalaco (Callao, 1899).

In the 1900s, due to the construction of the Panama Canal, the port of Callao was no longer flooded with the quantity of foreign sailors and travelers that had at one point made the port a point of much cultural diffusion. Nonetheless, by this moment more Peruvian cities had developed their own football clubs and leagues, the most important being those of Lima, Cusco, and Arequipa. Some of the most important new clubs founded at this time were Alianza Lima (Lima, 1901), Cienciano (Cusco, 1901), FBC Melgar (Arequipa, 1915), the Italian community's Circolo Sportivo Italiano (Lima, 1917), Atlético Grau (Piura, 1919), Alianza Atletico (Sullana, 1920), Universitario de Deportes (Lima, 1924), Sport Boys (Callao, 1927), and Coronel Bolognesi (Tacna, 1929). As such, the sport rapidly grew in Peru, but the most important amateur league (the Peruvian Football League) stayed in the capital province where a new football rivalry arose between the participating clubs of Lima and the clubs of Callao. Yet, the lack of a central organization often brought much conflict between the teams, and such a situation eventually escalated into a conflict that led to the creation of the Peruvian Football Federation in 1922 and a new Peruvian Football League tournament under the regulation of said organization in 1926.

=== List of first matches ===
The following list is the known first friendly matches according to the data published in the newspapers of that time.

Year	Team 1	Score	Team 2	Ground
1895	Lima Cricket	1–0	Unión Cricket	Campo Santa Sofía
1897	Lima Cricket	3–1	Unión Cricket	Campo Santa Sofía
1899	Lima Cricket	0–2	Unión Cricket	Campo Santa Sofía
1902	Atlético Chalaco	0–1	Sport Victoria	Pampa del Mar Bravo
1908	Lima Cricket	3–1	Unión Cricket	Campo Santa Sofía
1908	Lima Cricket	4–1	Unión Cricket	Campo Santa Sofía
1908	Atlético Chalaco	1–0	Association FBC	Pampa del Mar Bravo
1909	Lima Cricket	2–0	Unión Cricket	Campo Santa Sofía
1909	Unión Cricket	1–0	Atlético Chalaco	Campo Santa Beatriz
1910	Sport Alianza	2–0	Sport Lima	Campo Manzanilla

== Professional era and regional recognition (1920s to 1930s) ==
Even though the Peruvian Football Federation had joined CONMEBOL in 1925, the re-structuring of the national league prevented the creation of a national football team that would be able to participate in the South American Championships of 1925 and 1926. Moreover, even though in the club level Peru had a series of strong teams, the Peru national team for the 1929 South American Championship was the first successful attempt at a Peru national team. Their first game played against Uruguay (recent winners of the Football Olympics), showed a largely disunited team still trying to mold into a team. The disunity could largely be blamed on class conflict and racial discrimination. The first fielded team was built largely of players from Alianza Lima and Universitario de Deportes, the former being composed of working-class men and the later of white university students. Alianza players felt more loyal to their local team than to the national team, and when it became clear that they were being segregated from the rest of the team and left out of the starting IX, they resigned from the national team before play at the South American Cup; they lost every match. The Football Federation approached the Alianza players again, and offered them reinstatement. Alianza agreed to the federation's terms, and played in the 1930 World Cup.

The time that followed saw the appearance of a group of excellent Peruvian football players that would help further expand the popularity of the sport not only in Peru, but also in other countries of South America. During the 1920s and 1930s, Peruvian clubs made a series of international tours across South America due to the high demand of the skill of their players in places such as Colombia, Venezuela, and in Chile. Peru's art of skill and technique of association football was felt and given a highly positive look in these many countries. In Colombia, the appearance of Ciclista Lima Association allegedly made the Colombian crowds "vibrate with excitement" as they anticipated much skill from the Peruvian squad. In 1928, the Peruvian club Atlético Chalaco made a tour in Chile and defeated seven Chilean teams they faced and only lost to Colo-Colo. In 1933 Alianza Lima made a tour in Chile and, with Peruvians such as Teodoro Fernandez and Alejandro Villanueva, delighted the audiences with their skill and defeated a series of important Chilean clubs of that time such as Club Deportivo Magallanes, Santiago Wanderers, Audax Italiano, and Colo-Colo. In Peru, Alejandro Villanueva is often remembered as one of the finest exponents of that nation's association football and as the player that amazed the crowds with his bicycle kicks which the people of Lima at first thought was his invention when he executed it in 1928 and it was called "tiro caracol" and, later, upon learning of its roots in Callao, once again called chalaca. In 1930, they were invited to participate in a new intercontinental competition to be held in Montevideo, Uruguay, the first FIFA World Cup.

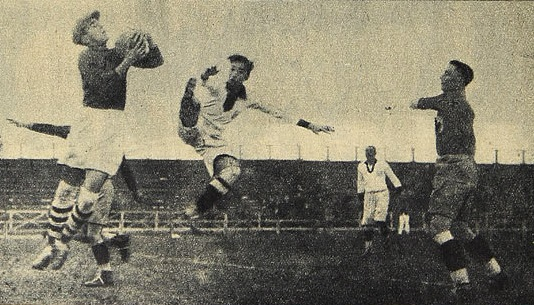
Romanian goalkeeper against the Peruvian striker Lores during the 1930 FIFA World Cup.

The 1930 FIFA World Cup was an interesting experience for all the teams participating. For the Peruvian team, their first match against the Romania national football team was filled with problems as the Romanians and Peruvians played a rough match that eventually led to a broken leg for one of the Romanian players. This and several other incidents on the field, such as the first-minute goal by Romania, soon led to the World Cup's first player dismissed, the Peruvian Plácido Galindo. After all the commotion was settled due to this decision by the referee, Peru was able to momentarily tie the game. Nevertheless, the lack of a player and the inexperience of the national side gave (after two consecutive goals) a pleasing 3–1 result to Romania. Afterwards, in the match against the hosts, Uruguay, that would inaugurate the Estadio Centenario, Peru played an allegedly formidable game against the Charruas. In fact, Peru lost only by one goal to Uruguay, thus showing a sign of improvement from the past 1929 result against Uruguay (who would later go on to beat Romania 4-0 and eventually beat Argentina to crown themselves champions of the tournament).

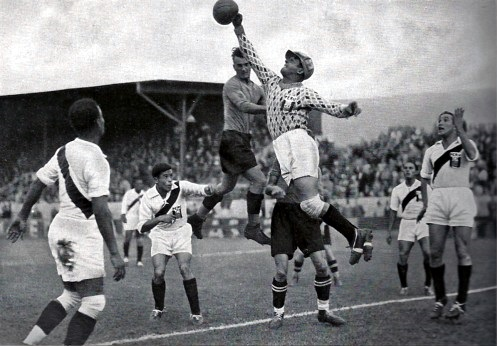
Juan Valdivieso, goalkeeper of the Peru national football team, reaches out for the football during the 1936 Berlin Summer Olympics match between Austria and Peru.

Later, during 1936 Berlin Olympics, the team further showed how much they had improved since 1929. Largely with the squad of the 1930s, but with a new group of young stars, Peru made a great start by defeating the Finland national football team with a margin of 7–3. Even more surprisingly, the Peruvians defied all odds and managed to defeat Austria on a 4–2 result during over-time. Still, the team formally withdrew due to problems with the German government's intervention causing the International Olympic Committee to nullify Peru's victory against Austria and ordering a re-match. Even though the team was already making history, their perseverance would soon lead them to the consolidation of their grandeur. In 1938, Peru's first international title would finally come during the first Bolivarian Games, which Peru won after winning all their games against the football teams of Bolivia, Ecuador, Colombia, and Venezuela. Then, further consolidating their status as Peru's first golden generation, the national squad won Peru's first South American Championship (later known as Copa América) in 1939. Once again, the national squad lost none of its matches and in their path to the finals defeated Ecuador, Chile, and Paraguay. For the final, Peru had to yet again face Uruguay, but this time the team was able to overcome the challenge and defeated Uruguay by a close margin of 2–1. Peruvian player Teodoro Fernández became the tournament's maximum goal scorer with 7 goals, and currently retains the historic second place of the competition. As a result of these many titles, victories, and important showings, the early years of Peru's football history went extraordinarily well, and the team was able to effectively build its game along with the increasing competition of the CONMEBOL region.

== Decline and rise (1940s–1960s) ==
Nonetheless, due to a series of internal problems, Peru's football years after this first golden generation did not involve any other major accomplishments. The 1940s and 1950s flew by with only the achievements of a gold and bronze medal at the Bolivarian Games, and a couple of third places in the Copa América. During the 1960s Peru began to slowly show signs of improvement as the team won the Bolivarian Games of Barranquilla and qualified for the 1960 Summer Olympics held in Rome. Even though the team was only capable of beating the India national football team after losing to France and Hungary, the squad once again began to give its fans bright hopes for the future.

== 1970s Golden Generation (1970s to 1980s) ==
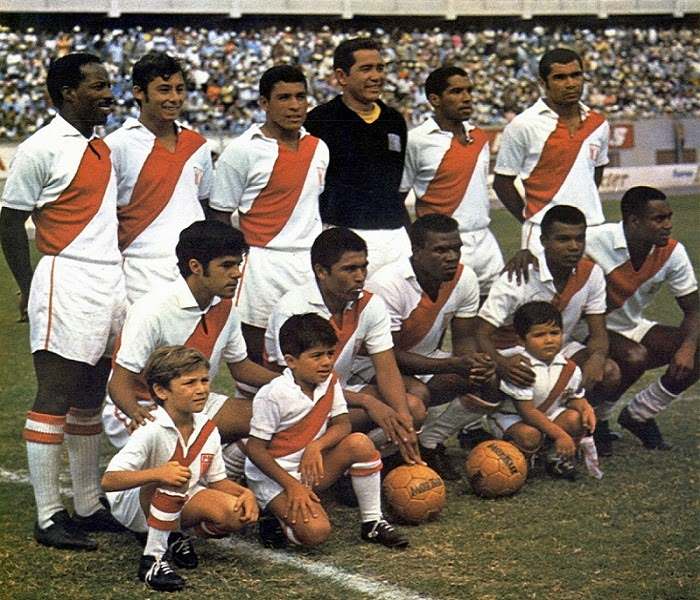
Peru's 1970 FIFA World Cup squad

Once into the 1970s, the Peruvian "Blanquirrojas" rose with a number of international victories and a string of young football stars that made the team into a major competitive force. Players like Teófilo Cubillas, Pedro Pablo Leon, Héctor Chumpitaz, Ramon Mifflin, Hugo Sotil, Roberto Challe, and César Cueto, helped make Peruvian football competitive on the world stage. In 1970, Peru participated in the 1970 FIFA World Cup, advancing into the quarterfinals after first eliminating Argentina in the qualifiers, defeating Bulgaria 3–2 after trailing 0–2, losing 3–1 to Germany, and defeating Morocco 3–0. In 1975, Peru achieved its second Copa América title and were champions at the Bolivarian Games twice through the late 1980s.

== Modern history (1990s to present) ==
Heading towards the 21st century, the 1990s were not very good years for the Peruvian football team. The terrible 1987 Alianza Lima air disaster further crushed the hopes for the team as a series of good players ready to play for the national team died. Although there were still several good players like Julio César Uribe, Nolberto Solano, Claudio Pizarro, and José del Solar, the team was no longer the "Golden Team" of the 70s. In terms of Copa América, the squad could only go as far as the quarterfinals before getting eliminated. Meanwhile, in the World Cup qualifiers, the team was not able to even get close to reaching another FIFA tournament until 1998, but that dream was also thwarted by a goal difference with Chile. The only important title the team won during these years was the Kirin Cup, where they shared first place with Belgium.

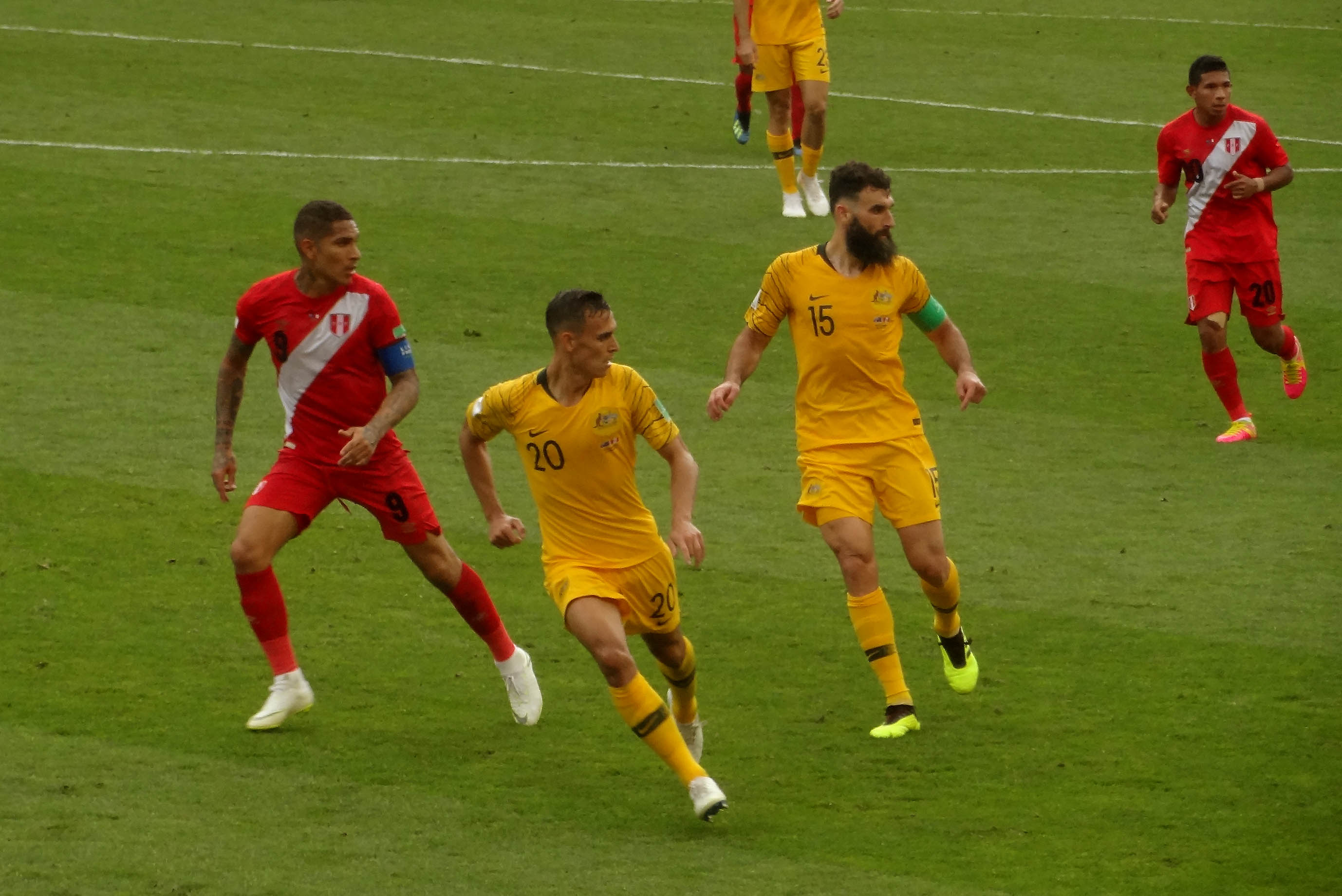
Peru vs Australia at the 2018 FIFA World Cup

The early 21st century brought with it the same Peruvian team, a shadow of its former self. Nevertheless, the squad began getting new revivals once the team began getting new young players with new hopes and goals. As the years kept going, Peruvian football once more started to give signs of vitality as local teams from the league began doing rather well in international competitions. Yet, the results were still vastly the same for the Peruvian team in terms of both the Copa América and the FIFA World Cup Qualifiers. Quite surprisingly, Peru was able to do well when they were invited to participate in the CONCACAF Gold Cup and even won another Kirin Cup in 2005. Meanwhile, in 2007, the football fans of Peru received another great surprise as the national U-17 squad qualified and reached the quarterfinals (for their first time) of their FIFA World Cup. With young star players like Jefferson Farfán and José Paolo Guerrero had given new hopes to fans that things would turn around for the better. Nonetheless, the possibilities of Peru securing a CONMEBOL place for the 2010 FIFA World Cup have completely vanished since the team has tumbled to the bottom of the qualification table.

In 2011 Peru won the Kirin Cup tournament, and earned third place in the 2011 Copa América. In early 2015, businessman Edwin Oviedo became FPF president, succeeding Burga, who two years later faced charges of racketeering, wire fraud, and money laundering in a football corruption trial in the United States. The FPF's new leadership appointed Ricardo Gareca as Peru's manager in March 2015. After coaching the national team to a third place in the 2015 Copa América and to the quarterfinals of the Copa América Centenario, Gareca qualified Peru for the Russia 2018 World Cup finals.

== Other teams ==
Outside its senior side, Peru also has the Olympic/U-23, U-20 and U-17 teams. A women's team also competes in other South American competitions.

In spite of its rich men's senior records, its youth teams have been mostly the lackluster of CONMEBOL competitions. The Olympic side of Peru has not qualified for the Summer Olympics since it became an U-23 competition in 1992. The U-20 team has competed in every South American Youth Football Championship but it has never qualified for any FIFA U-20 World Cup. Meanwhile, Peru has only managed to qualify for only one FIFA U-17 World Cup in 2007, outside being host of the 2005 FIFA U-17 World Cup. The women's team has never reached FIFA Women's World Cup, and has mainly competed in the Copa América Femenina.

== Football stadiums in Peru ==
Stadiums with a capacity of 30,000 or higher are included.

#	Image	Stadium	Capacity	City	Home team(s)	Opened
1		Estadio Monumental "U"	80,093	Lima	Universitario	2000
2		Estadio Monumental de la UNSA	60,370	Arequipa	Melgar	1995
3		Estadio Nacional	53,086	Lima	Peru	1952
4		Estadio Garcilaso	45,056	Cusco	Cienciano; Cusco FC; Deportivo Garcilaso	1950
5		Estadio Alejandro Villanueva	35,938	Lima	Alianza Lima	1974
6		Estadio Universidad San Marcos	32,000	Lima	Universidad San Marcos	1951
7		Estadio Manuel Rivera Sánchez	32,000	Chimbote	José Gálvez	2007
8		Estadio Monumental de la UNA	30,000	Puno	Alfonso Ugarte de Puno	2022

== Attendances ==
The average attendance per top-flight football league season and the club with the highest average attendance:

Season	League average	Best club	Best club average
2025	7,003	Universitario de Deportes	38,833
2015	5,744	Melgar	15,342

== See also ==
- List of football stadiums in Peru
- Peruvian football league system
