= Estadio Facundo Ramírez Aguilar =

Multi-purpose stadium in Callao, Peru

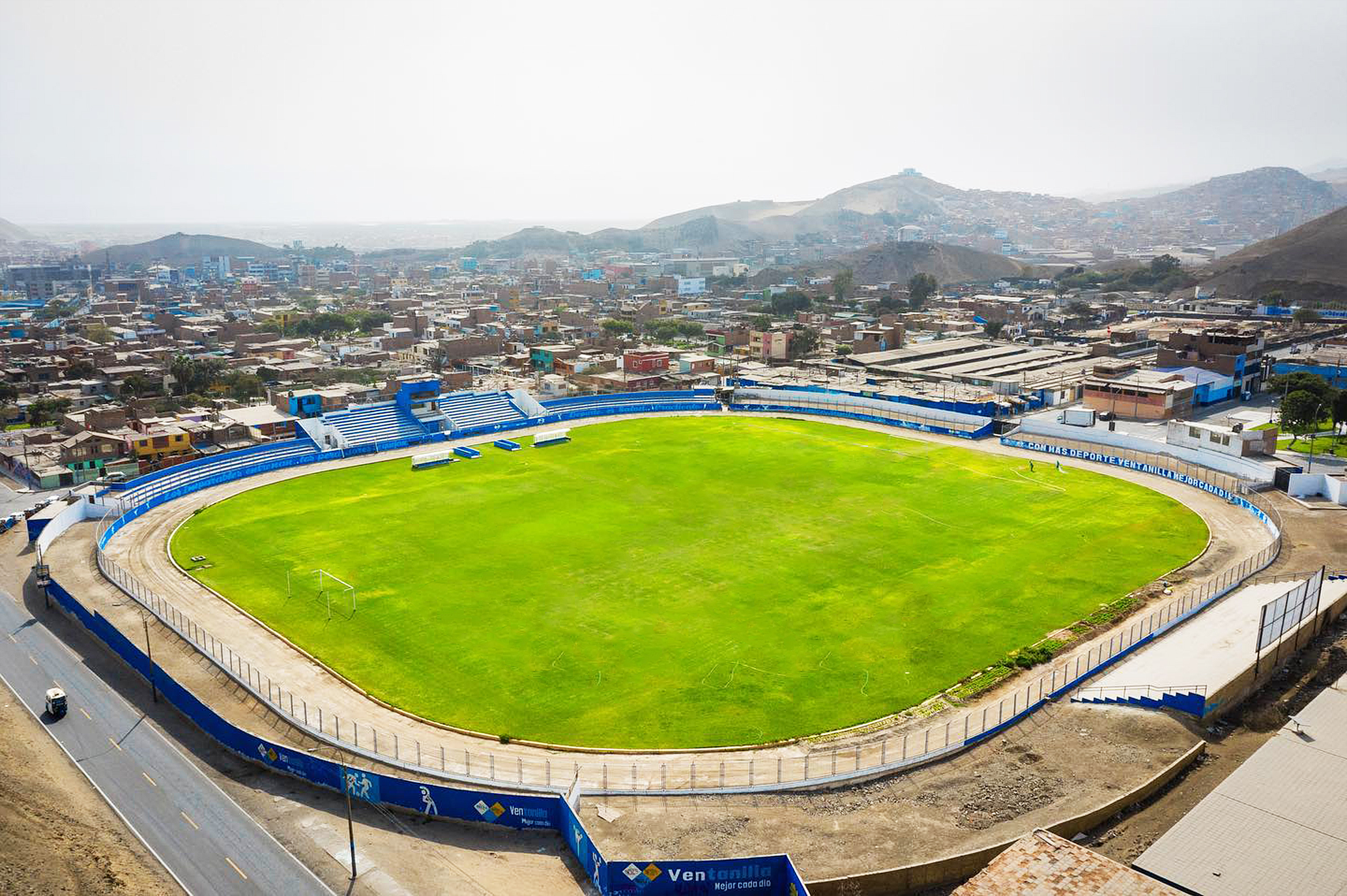
- Interactive map of Estadio Facundo Ramírez Aguilar
- Location: Callao, Peru
- Coordinates: 11.8740°S 77.1205°W
- Owner: Instituto Peruano del Deporte
- Capacity: 2,000
- Surface: Grass

Tenant
- Amazon Callao FC

Estadio Facundo Ramírez Aguilar is a multi-purpose stadium in Callao, Peru, in the district of Ventanilla. It is mostly used for football, being home to Amazon Callao FC of the Peruvian Tercera División along with some local teams. It has a capacity of 2,000.
