= Kimbiri District =

Coordinates: 12.6195°S 73.7888°W

Kimbiri District Distrito de Kimbiri
- District
- Interactive map of Kimbiri District
- Country: Peru
- Region: Lima
- Province: La Convención
- Founded: May 4, 1990
- Capital: Kimbiri
- Subdivisions: 20 populated centers

Government
  - Mayor: Guillermo Torres Palomino (2007-2010)

Area
  - Total: 1,134.69 km^{2} (438.11 sq mi)
- Elevation: 1,600 m (5,200 ft)

Population (2005 census)
  - Total: 14,442
  - Density: 12.728/km^{2} (32.965/sq mi)
- Time zone: UTC-5 (PET)
- Website: munikimbiri.gob.pe

Kimbiri is a district in the western La Convención Province in Peru. It is bordered by Ayacucho Region on the west, Pichari District on the north, Echarate District on the east, and Vilcabamba District on the south.

== Ethnic groups ==
The people in the district are mainly indigenous citizens of Quechua descent. Quechua is the language which the majority of the population (63.57%) learnt to speak in childhood, 29.32% of the residents started speaking using the Spanish language (2007 Peru Census).
