= Deportivo Lute =

- Full name: Club Cultural Social Deportivo Lute
- Nickname: Huracán Zañero
- Founded: November 25, 2019; 6 years ago
- Ground: Estadio César Flores Marigorda
- Capacity: 7,000
- Chairman: Luis Jiménez
- Manager: Marcial Salazar
- League: Liga 3

Club Cultural Social Deportivo Lute, shortened to Deportivo Lute, is a Peruvian football club based in the city Lambayeque. It was founded in 2019 and since 2025, competes in the Peruvian Tercera División.

== History ==
Deportivo Lute was founded on 25 November, 2019 in the Zaña District of the Department of Lambayeque. The club pays tribute to the Zañero soccer player Eleuterio Cossio Colchado, nicknamed Lute. Since 2022 it began its official participation in the Liga Distrital de Lagunas, qualifying for the 2022 Copa Perú. However, they were eliminated after a claim filed by Deportivo La Balsa due to the alleged poor registration of a player. Although initially the Liga Departamental de Lambayeque declared the claim inadmissible, the FPF ruled in favor of La Balsa, granting it a pass to the national stage.

I 2024, the club won the three-time district championship and qualified for the provincial stage, where it reached third place, which allowed them to advance to the departmental stage. In the latter, they managed to be crowned champion after beating Club Unión Juventud San Martín by the minimum difference which ensured their qualification to the National Stage of the 2024 Copa Perú.

In the National Stage, the club passed the first phase and placed 23rd in the general standings. In the round of 16, they faced Deportivo Ucrania where they were eliminated. Despite the elimination, Deportivo Lute secured promotion to the Liga 3 for being the best ranked team of Lambayeque.

== Stadium ==
Deportivo Lute play their home games at Estadio César Flores Marigorda located in the city of Lambayeque. Opened in 2001, the stadium has a capacity of 7,000.

== Honours ==
=== Senior titles ===
Keys

- Record
- ^{(s)} Shared record

Type	Competition	Titles	Runner-up	Winning years	Runner-up years
Regional (League)	Liga Departamental de Lambayeque	1	—	2024	—
Regional (League)	Liga Provincial de Chiclayo	1	1	2024	2022
Regional (League)	Liga Distrital de Huánuco	3	—	2022, 2023, 2024	—

== Managers ==
Manager	Years
(Peru) Moisés Cabada	2022–24
(Peru) Marcial Salazar	2025–

== See also ==
- List of football clubs in Peru
- Peruvian football league system
