= Juventus FC (Huamachuco) =

Juventus
- Full name: Juventus Fútbol Club Huamachuco
- Nicknames: La Juve; Bianconeros
- Founded: August 22, 2011; 15 years ago
- Ground: Estadio Municipal de Huamachuco
- Capacity: 5,000
- League: Liga 3

Juventus FC Huamachuco is a Peruvian football club based in Huamachuco. It was founded in 2011 and competes in the Peruvian Tercera División, the third tier of Peruvian football.

== History ==
The club was founded on July 11, 2011, in the city of Huamachuco as Deportivo Juventus, that same year it participated in the Second Division of the district of Huamachuco.

=== Copa Peru ===
In 2024, Juventus won the Liga Distrial de Huamachuco and later Liga Provincial de Sánchez Carrión, qualifying for the Liga Departamental de La Libertad for the second time and winning the tournament for the first time, entering the National Stage of the 2024 Copa Perú. The club placed 6th in the National Stage and advanced to the knockout stage. They were later eliminated by FC Cajamarca in the quarter finals. Being the highest ranked team from La Libertad, Juventus gained promotion to the Liga 3.

=== Liga 3 ===
In the 2025 Liga 3, Juventus advanced to the second phase, where they were eliminated after recording 2 wins and 4 losses.

In the 2026 season, Juventus were relegated to the 2027 Copa Perú with two rounds of the regional stage still remaining. At the time, they were sitting in second-to-last place with three wins, two draws, and nine losses.

== Stadium ==
Juventus plays at their home ground, Estadio Municipal de Huamachuco, located in their home city Huamachuco. With a capacity of 5,000, the club shares the stadium with Deportivo Llacuabamba.

== Honours ==
=== Senior titles ===
Keys

- Record
- ^{(s)} Shared record

Type	Competition	Titles	Runner-up	Winning years	Runner-up years
Regional (League)	Liga Departamental de La Libertad	1	—	2024	—
Regional (League)	Liga Provincial de Sánchez Carrión	2	—	2016, 2024	—
Regional (League)	Liga Distrital de Huamachuco	2	—	2016, 2024	2015

== See also ==
- List of football clubs in Peru
- Peruvian football league system
