= 2024 Torneo de Reservas (Peru) =

Torneo de Reservas
- Season: 2024
- Dates: 23 May – 25 October 2024
- Champions: Universitario (1st title)
- U-20 Copa Libertadores: Universitario

The Torneo de Reservas was a football tournament in Peru. There are currently 18 clubs in the league. In addition, on the playing field there must be a minimum of five Under-19s (2005 category onwards), and a maximum of 6 Under-23s (2001 category), of which only two can be free category (over 23). Finally, a U-16 (2008 category onwards) will have to add 60 minutes per game.

Additionally, the eight qualifiers for the 2024 Torneo de Promoción y Reserva's quarterfinals will directly access 2025 Liga 3.

== Teams ==
=== Stadia and locations ===
Locations of the 2024 Torneo de Reserva teams
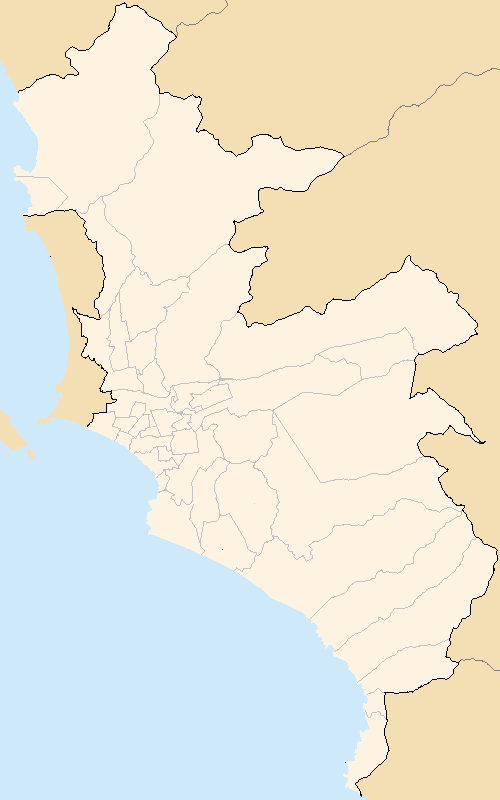
Locations of the 2024 Torneo de Reserva teams – Lima.
Locations of the 2024 Torneo de Reserva teams – Callao.

Team	City	Stadium	Capacity
ADT	Tarma	Unión Tarma	9,100
Alianza Atlético	Sullana	Campeones del 36	12,000
Alianza Lima	Lima	Alejandro Villanueva (Note: Since Estadio Alejandro Villanueva was sanctioned with a 7-month closure for domestic matches due to the incidents at the end of the second leg of the 2023 Liga 1 finals, Alianza Lima play their Torneo Apertura home matches at Estadio Nacional in Lima, with Estadio Iván Elías Moreno in Lima registered as an alternate stadium in the event that Estadio Nacional is unavailable.)	35,938
Atlético Grau	Sullana (Note: For this season, Atlético Grau moved from Bernal to Sullana as their regular stadium Estadio Municipal de Bernal did not meet FPF requirements.)	Campeones del 36	12,000
Carlos A. Mannucci	Trujillo	Mansiche	25,036
Cienciano	Cusco	Garcilaso	45,056
Comerciantes Unidos	Cutervo	Juan Maldonado Gamarra	12,000
Cusco	Cusco	Garcilaso	45,056
Deportivo Garcilaso	Cusco	Garcilaso	45,056
Los Chankas	Andahuaylas	Municipal Los Chankas	10,000
Melgar	Arequipa	Virgen de Chapi	60,370
Sport Boys	Callao	Miguel Grau	17,000
Sport Huancayo	Huancayo	Huancayo	20,000
Sporting Cristal	Lima	Alberto Gallardo	11,600
Unión Comercio	Tarapoto	Carlos Vidaurre García	18,000
Universidad César Vallejo	Trujillo	Mansiche	25,036
Universitario	Lima	Monumental	80,093
UTC	Cajabamba (Note: For this season, UTC moved from Cajamarca to Cajambaba as their regular stadium Estadio Héroes de San Ramón did not meet FPF requirements.)	Germán Contreras Jara	6,300

== First Stage ==
=== Zona Norte ===
==== Standings ====
Pos	Team	Pld	W	D	L	GF	GA	GD	Pts	Qualification	UNI	UCV	CAM	SBA	CAG	UCO	UTC	COM	AAS
1	Universitario	16	12	2	2	44	16	+28	38	Quarter-finals and 2025 Liga 3		2–0	3–2	2–2	2–0	6–0	3–1	7–0	3–0
2	Universidad César Vallejo	16	11	1	4	33	16	+17	34	Quarter-finals and 2025 Liga 3	1–2		2–2	2–1	2–1	2–1	3–0	5–0	2–1
3	Carlos A. Mannucci	16	9	2	5	36	22	+14	29	Round of 16	2–0	1–2		5–0	3–1	1–0	1–0	5–2	5–1
4	Sport Boys	16	9	2	5	28	21	+7	29	Round of 16	3–2	0–2	1–3		2–1	1–0	2–0	4–0	2–0
5	Atlético Grau	16	8	2	6	26	18	+8	26	Round of 16	0–3	0–1	1–0	2–0		5–0	0–0	1–0	6–2
6	Unión Comercio	16	6	2	8	30	29	+1	20	Round of 16	0–0	3–2	2–0	1–4	0–2		5–0	5–2	6–0
7	UTC	16	4	3	9	19	28	−9	15		1–3	2–0	1–1	1–1	1–2	2–1		0–2	7–0
8	Comerciantes Unidos	16	4	1	11	19	46	−27	13		3–4	0–2	3–1	0–2	1–1	1–5	1–2		2–1
9	Alianza Atlético	16	1	1	14	15	54	−39	4		1–2	0–5	3–4	0–3	1–3	1–1	3–1	1–2	

First match(es) will be played: 12 September 2024. Source:
Legend: Blue = home team win; Yellow = draw; Red = away team win.
Rules for classification: 1) Points; 2) Goal difference; 3) Goals for; 4) Fair play points; 5) Drawing of lots.

=== Zona Sur ===
==== Standings ====
Pos	Team	Pld	W	D	L	GF	GA	GD	Pts	Qualification	MEL	ALI	ADT	SHU	CRI	CIE	GAR	CHA	CUS
1	Melgar	16	11	2	3	46	15	+31	35	Quarter-finals and 2025 Liga 3		3–3	2–0	7–0	1–1	2–0	8–1	7–0	7–0
2	Alianza Lima	16	10	3	3	41	18	+23	33	Quarter-finals and 2025 Liga 3	3–0		2–0	2–0	2–1	4–0	3–1	3–1	10–0
3	ADT	16	10	2	4	32	19	+13	32	Round of 16	2–0	3–2		3–1	4–2	0–0	0–0	2–1	7–0
4	Sport Huancayo	16	8	2	6	30	25	+5	26	Round of 16	—	1–1	2–3		1–1	0–1	4–1	2–0	2–0
5	Sporting Cristal	16	7	4	5	39	18	+21	25	Round of 16	1–0	3–1	5–1	1–4		0–1	1–0	4–0	12–0
6	Cienciano	16	6	4	6	20	20	0	22	Round of 16	1–3	2–0	1–3	1–2	0–0		1–1	1–1	5–0
7	Deportivo Garcilaso	16	5	4	7	21	30	−9	19		1–2	2–3	1–0	1–3	1–0	2–1		3–2	1–1
8	Los Chankas	16	1	3	12	16	44	−28	6		2–3	1–2	0–3	2–6	1–1	1–3	0–0		1–2
9	Cusco	16	1	2	13	9	65	−56	5		0–1	0–0	0–1	1–2	1–6	1–2	1–5	2–3	

First match(es) will be played: 13 September 2024. Source:
Legend: Blue = home team win; Yellow = draw; Red = away team win.
Rules for classification: 1) Points; 2) Goal difference; 3) Goals for; 4) Fair play points; 5) Drawing of lots.

== Play-offs ==
=== Bracket ===
First round
Sport Huancayo	3
Atlético Grau	0
Cienciano	3
Carlos A. Mannucci	2
Sport Boys	3 (6)
Sporting Cristal	3 (5)
ADT	0 (5)
Unión Comercio	0 (4)

Quarter-finals
Universitario	0	4	4
Sport Huancayo	2	1	3
Alianza Lima	2	3	5
Cienciano	1	0	1
Melgar	2	1	3
Sport Boys	0	0	0
ADT	2	2	4
Universidad César Vallejo	0	3	3

Semi-finals
Universitario	2	2	4
Alianza Lima	1	0	1
Melgar	2	4	6
ADT	1	0	1

Final
Universitario	2
Melgar	1

=== Round of 16 ===
25 September 2024	Sport Huancayo	3–0	Atlético Grau	Estadio IPD Huancayo, Huancayo
15:00	Luis Alejandro Torres 43'; Juan David Martínez 80' 88'

25 September 2024	Carlos A. Mannucci	2–3	Cienciano	Complejo UPAO, Trujillo
15:00	Alejandro Montalva 37'; Denzel Caña 60' (o.g.)		Sharif Ramírez 40' 90+4'; Josseph Jiménez 66'

25 September 2024	Sport Boys	3–3 (6–5 p)	Sporting Cristal	Estadio Campolo Alcalde, Callao
15:00	Alexis Huamán 25'; Fabrizio Roca 65' 71'		José María Mellan 57'; Mateo Rodríguez 85'; Jair Moretti 88'

26 September 2024	ADT	0–0 (5–4 p)	Unión Comercio	Estadio Unión Tarma, Tarma
15:00

=== Quarter-finals ===
==== First leg ====
1 October 2024	Sport Huancayo	2–0	Universitario	Estadio IPD Huancayo, Huancayo
14:00	Ghian Lucca Sotelo 16'; Juan David Martínez 79'

1 October 2024	Cienciano	1–2	Alianza Lima	Estadio Túpac Amaru, Sicuani
14:00	Josué Espinoza 22'		Junior Buitrón 80'; Víctor Guzmán 90+3'

1 October 2024	Sport Boys	0–2	Melgar	Estadio Campolo Alcalde, Callao
14:00			Adriano Zúñiga 80'; Carlos Aguinaga 90'

1 October 2024	ADT	2–0	Universidad César Vallejo	Estadio Unión Tarma, Tarma
14:00	Jhojan Garcilazo 37'; Josué Montenegro 64'

==== Second leg ====
6 October 2024	Universitario	4–1	Sport Huancayo	Campo Mar - U, Lima
14:00	Alex Pullchz 3'; Yuriel Celi 75' 90+2'; Adrián Cáceres 81'		73'

6 October 2024	Alianza Lima	3–0	Cienciano	Estadio Alejandro Villanueva, Lima
14:00	Víctor Guzmán 63'; Bascco Soyer 69'; Marcelo Matzuda 89'

6 October 2024	Melgar	1–0	Sport Boys	Estadio Monumental UNSA, Arequipa
14:00	Carlos Aguinaga 43'

6 October 2024	Universidad César Vallejo	3–2	ADT	Villa Poeta, Trujillo
14:00	Diego Ulloa 41'; Christian Albinco 45+5'; Jordan Romero 67'		Inga 38' 61'

=== Semi-finals ===
==== First leg ====
12 October 2024	Alianza Lima	1–2	Universitario	Estadio Alejandro Villanueva, Lima
14:00	Bassco Soyer 48'		Yuriel Celi 52'; Rodrigo Dioses 80'

13 October 2024	ADT	1–2	Melgar	Estadio Unión Tarma, Tarma
11:00	Alexander Hidalgo 27'		Carlos Aguinaga 9' 80'

==== Second leg ====
20 October 2024	Universitario	2–0	Alianza Lima	Campo Mar - U, Lima
10:45	Alex Pullchz 5'; Jhamill Mejía 85'

20 October 2024	Melgar	4–0	ADT	Estadio Monumental UNSA, Arequipa
11:00	Bruno Portugal 5'; Josiney Ríos 16'; Gian Carlo García 55'; Michel Estela 72'

=== Final ===
25 October 2024	Universitario	2–1	Melgar	Estadio Iván Elías Moreno, Lima
14:00	Milton Medina 11'; Álvaro Rojas 28'		Bruno Portugal 29'

== See also ==
- 2024 Liga 1
- 2024 Liga 2
