= Estadio IPD de Nueva Cajamarca =

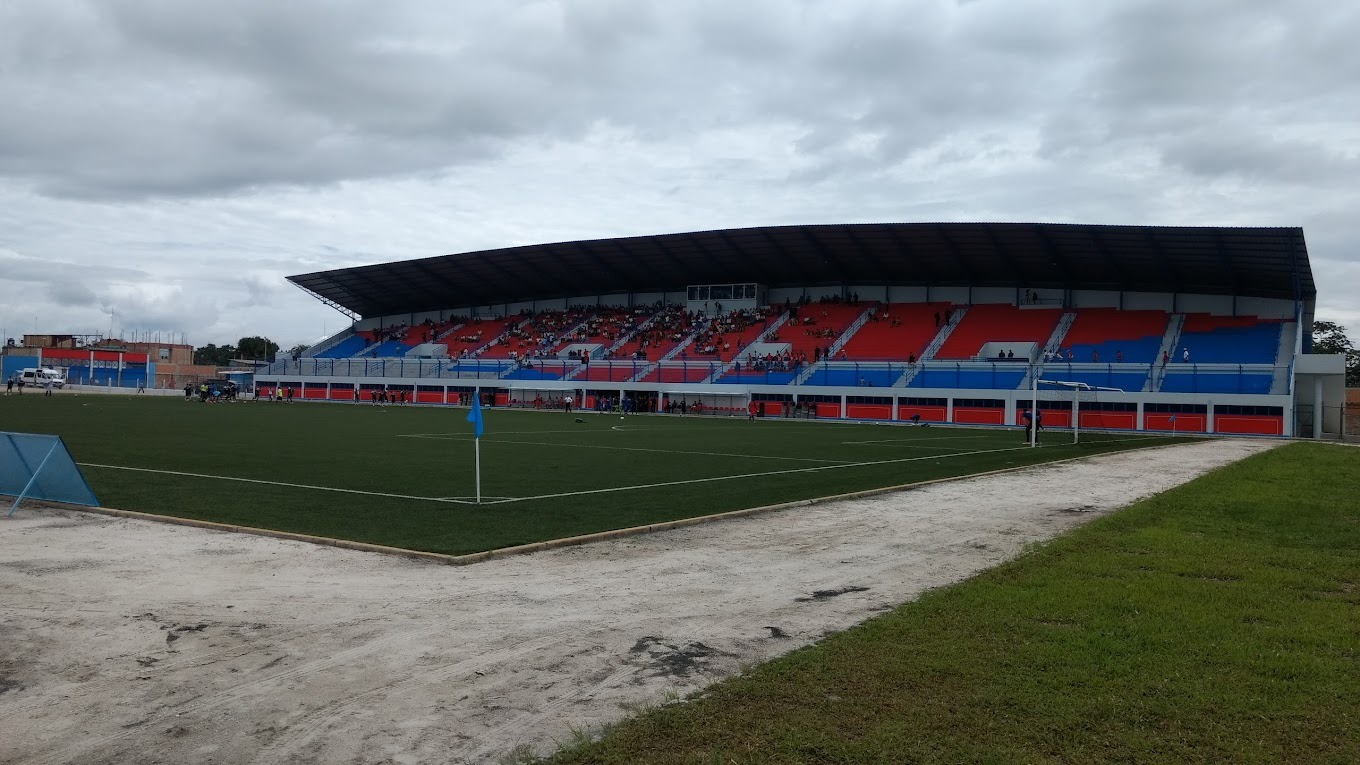
- Location: Nueva Cajamarca, Peru
- Capacity: 12,000
- Surface: Artificial turf

Construction
- Opened: 2017

Tenants
- Unión Comercio; Deportivo Ucrania

The Estadio IPD de Nueva Cajamarca is a multi-use stadium located in Nueva Cajamarca, Peru. Opened in 2017, it is the home ground for Unión Comercio of the Liga 2 and Deportivo Ucrania of the Liga 3. Unión Comercio played at the stadium in the Liga 1 between 2017 and 2018 until they had to move to Tarapoto because the stadium did not meet federation requirements. The stadium has a capacity of 12,000.
