= Juventud Alfa FC =

Juventud Alfa
- Full name: Juventud Alfa Pisac Fútbol Club
- Nickname: Los Alfas
- Founded: February 7, 2023; 2 years ago
- Ground: Estadio Thomas Ernesto Payne
- Capacity: 8,000
- Manager: Aristóteles Ramos
- League: Liga 3

Juventud Alfa FC is a Peruvian football club from Písac, Cusco. Founded in 2023, it competes in the Peruvian Tercera División, the third tier of Peruvian football.

== History ==
Juventud Alfa was founded on 7 February, 2023, based in the city of Písac. The club were runner-up in the Liga Distrital de Písac in 2023 and won the league in 2024.

In the 2024 Copa Perú, after qualifying for placing 2nd in the Liga Departamental de Cusco, Juventud Alfa reaching the Round of 16 where they were eliminated by FCR San Antonio. They were promoted to the Liga 3 after being the best performed team from Cusco.

== Stadium ==
The home ground of Juventud Alfa is the Estadio Thomas Ernesto Payne. The stadium has a capacity of 8,000.

== Honours ==
=== Senior titles ===
Keys

- Record
- ^{(s)} Shared record

| Type | Competition | Titles | Runner-up | Winning years | Runner-up years |
|---|---|---|---|---|---|
| Regional (League) | Liga Departamental de Cusco | — | 1 | — | 2024 |
| Regional (League) | Liga Provincial de Calca | — | 1 | — | 2024 |
| Regional (League) | Liga Distrital de Písac | 1 | 1 | 2024 | 2023 |

== See also ==
- List of football clubs in Peru
- Peruvian football league system
