= Asociación Deportiva Ucayali FC =

Peruvian football club

Ucayali FC
- Full name: Asociación Deportiva Ucayali FC
- Founded: 2019; 7 years ago
- League: Liga 3

Asociación Deportiva Ucayali FC, popularly known as Ucayali FC, is a Peruvian football club, based in the city of Pucallpa. They currently compete in the Liga 3, the third tier of Peruvian football.

== History ==
=== 2024: Promotion to Liga 3 ===
During the 2024 season, the club finished as district runner-up, later winning the provincial title and ultimately being crowned departmental champion. This achievement secured its qualification for the National Stage of the 2024 Copa Perú for the first time in its five-year history. Once in the national phase, the team advanced past the regular stage in 14th place, earning a spot in the Round of 32. However, it was eliminated at that stage by Cultural Volante of Cajamarca after a 1–0 away defeat and a 1–1 home draw, resulting in a 2–1 aggregate loss.

Despite this elimination, Construcción Civil achieved promotion to the newly created Liga 3 for the following season, as the other departmental representative, Deportivo Municipal de Tingo María, had been eliminated one round earlier in the competition.

=== Liga 3 ===
In 2025, during the inaugural Liga 3 season, the club reached the group stage, where it finished fourth in Group D, failing to qualify for the quarter-finals.

=== Asociación Deportiva Ucayali FC ===
On April 23, 2026, through an official statement, the club’s Board of Directors announced that, with the aim of strengthening talent development and expanding the region’s sporting horizons, it had unanimously approved that, effective immediately, the institution would adopt the name Asociación Deportiva Ucayali FC, also relocating its headquarters to the Ucayali Region.

== Club name change ==
Season	Club name
2019–23 April 2026	Club Deportivo Construcción Civil
24 April 2026–present	Asociación Deportiva Ucayali FC

== Colours and badge ==
Construcción Civil's badge, 2019–26

== Honours ==
=== Senior titles ===
Keys

- Record
- ^{(s)} Shared record

Type	Competition	Titles	Runner-up	Winning years	Runner-up years
Regional (League)	Liga Departamental de Huánuco	1	—	2024	—
Regional (League)	Liga Provincial de Huánuco	1	1	2024	2023
Regional (League)	Liga Distrital de Huánuco	1	1	2023	2024

== See also ==
- List of football clubs in Peru
- Peruvian football league system
- Copa Perú
