= Estudiantil CNI =

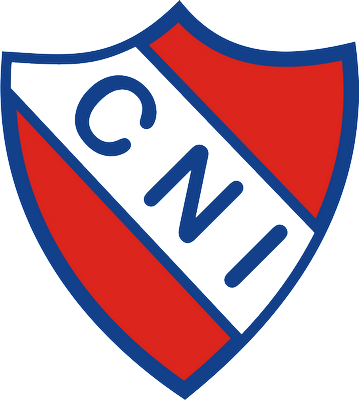
- Club logo
- Full name: Club Deportivo Estudiantil CNI
- Founded: July 30, 1996
- Ground: Estadio Max Augustín; Iquitos
- Capacity: 24,000
- League: Copa Perú
- Eliminated in District Stage
Home colours	Away colours

Club Deportivo Estudiantil CNI (sometimes referred to as Estudiantil CNI) is a Peruvian football club, playing in the city of Iquitos, Loreto. It was founded in 1996 and is part of the larger club, Colegio Nacional Iquitos.

== History ==
=== 1996: Foundation ===
The Club Deportivo Estudiantil CNI was founded on July 30, 1996, by a group of teachers from the CNI Educational Institution. It was established as a non-profit club with the sole purpose of promoting sports among young students. Since then, the club has participated in various local tournaments, such as the Comisión de Menores, Copa Federativa, and internal championships.

Thus, the club continues to remain active thanks to the support of the school administration and its board of directors, which is composed of the same teachers.

=== 2014–2015: Beginnings in Amateur Football ===
The years went by until 2014, when the club decided to take part in the Third Division of the Liga Distrital de Iquitos, managing to win the championship and earn promotion that same year to the Second Division.

The following year, in 2015, the club competed in that division, once again winning the championship and securing promotion to the First Division of the Liga Distrital de Iquitos.

=== 2016–2023: Copa Perú ===
In the 2016 Copa Perú, the club qualified to the National Stage, but was eliminated by Venus in the Repechage.

In the 2017 Copa Perú, the club qualified to the National Stage, but was eliminated when it finished in 3rd place.

In the 2018 Copa Perú, the club qualified to the National Stage, but was eliminated when it finished in 27th place.

In 2019 Copa Perú, the club was eliminated in the District Stage when it finished in 3rd place.

In the 2022 Copa Perú, the club finished as runners-up in the provincial stage and went on to become champions of both the provincial and departmental stages, thus qualifying for the National Stage. They were eliminated in the Round of 32 of the National Stage by Defensor La Bocana after losing both the away and home matches 1–0.

=== 2024: The Timely Promotion to Liga 3 ===
In the 2024 Copa Perú, the club earned a great opportunity to move up to a higher division following the creation of Liga 3 starting in 2025 Liga 3. They finished as district runners-up, provincial champions, and later departmental champions, which allowed them to qualify once again for the National Stage.

They reached the Round of 32 but were eliminated at that stage by Juventus FC of Huamachuco. Despite this, they secured promotion to Liga 3 as the representative of Loreto, having accumulated more points than the other club from the region, Dolce Bretaña FC.

== Honours ==
=== Senior titles ===
Keys

- Record
- ^{(s)} Shared record

Type	Competition	Titles	Runner-up	Winning years	Runner-up years
National (League)	Liga 3	—	1	—	2025
Regional (League)	Liga Departamental de Loreto	5	—	2016, 2017, 2018, 2022, 2024	—
Regional (League)	Liga Provincial de Maynas	4	1	2017, 2022, 2023, 2024	2016
Regional (League)	Liga Distrital de Iquitos	2	3	2016, 2023	2017, 2022, 2024

== See also ==
- List of football clubs in Peru
- Peruvian football league system
