= FCR San Antonio =

Football club based in Moquegua, Peru

- Full name: Fútbol Club Real San Antonio
- Founded: September 10, 2022
- Ground: Estadio 25 de Noviembre, Moquegua
- Capacity: 21,073
- Chairman: Lourdes Mamani
- Manager: Emerson Camargo
- League: Liga 3

FCR San Antonio (commonly referred to as San Antonio) is a Peruvian football club based in the district of San Antonio, Moquegua, Peru. The club participates in the Liga 3, the third tier of Peruvian football.

== History ==
FCR San Antonio was founded on 10 September 2022.

In 2024, the club participated in the Liga Distrital de San Antonio and won the league for the first time, later winning the Liga Provincial de Marsical Nieto and Liga Departamental de Moquegua, qualifying for the 2024 Copa Perú. They got eliminated by Deportivo Ucrania in the Round of 16. After being the best ranked team of Moquegua, they got promoted to the Liga 3.

== Stadium ==
While based in San Antonio, FCR San Antonio plays at Estadio 25 de Noviembre in Moquegua. The stadium was inaugurated in 2009 and has a capacity of 21,073.

== Honours ==
=== Senior titles ===
Keys

- Record
- ^{(s)} Shared record

Type	Competition	Titles	Runner-up	Winning years	Runner-up years
Regional (League)	Liga Departamental de Moquegua	1	—	2024	—
Regional (League)	Liga Provincial de Mariscal Nieto	1	—	2024	—
Regional (League)	Liga Distrital de San Antonio	1	—	2024	—

== See also ==
- List of football clubs in Peru
- Peruvian football league system
