= Club Deportivo Cultural Patriotas =

Peruvian football club

Patriotas FC
- Nickname(s): El elenco Patriota
- Short name: Patriotas FC
- Founded: September 20, 2023; 2 years ago
- Stadium: Estadio Jorge Basadre
- Capacity: 19,850
- Chairman: (Peru) Isaac Sánchez
- Manager: (Peru) Juan Carlos Nieto
- League: Liga 3

Club Deportivo Cultural Patriotas simply known as Patriotas FC, is a Peruvian football club based in the city of Tacna, Peru. The club plays in the Peruvian Tercera División, the third tier of Peruvian football. Patriotas plays their home games at Estadio Jorge Basadre.

== History ==
Club Deportivo Cultural Patriotas was founded on 2023, starting in the district second division of Coronel Gregorio Albarracín Lanchipa District, in 2024, it was runner-up at the district league, the Province League and the Department League.

In the National stage of Copa Perú 2024, the club placed 48th. Because of neighbors Bentín Tacna Heroica achieved promotion to the Peruvian Segunda División, Patriotas got promoted to the Peruvian Tercera División.

== Stadium ==
The club plays at Estadio Jorge Basadre, located in Tacna. The stadium has a capacity of 19,850.

== Honours ==
=== Senior titles ===
Keys

- Record
- ^{(s)} Shared record

Type	Competition	Titles	Runner-up	Winning years	Runner-up years
Regional (League)	Liga Departamental de Tacna	—	1	—	2024
Regional (League)	Liga Provincial de Tacna	—	1	—	2024
Regional (League)	Liga Distrital de Gregorio Albarracín	—	1	—	2024
Regional (League)	Segunda Distrital de Gregorio Albarracín	1	—	2023	—
