= Kimbiri =

- Town
- Location within Peru
- Coordinates: 12°29′18″S 73°50′30″W
- Country: Peru
- Region: Cusco
- Province: La Convención
- District: Kimbiri

Government
  - Mayor: Guillermo Torres Palomino
- Time zone: UTC-5 (PET)
- Website: www.munikimbiri.gob.pe

Kimbiri is a town in Southern Peru, capital of the district Kimbiri in the province La Convención in the region Cusco.
