= Estadio Max Augustín =

Sports venue in Iquitos, Peru

Coordinates: 3°44′37″S 73°15′10″W

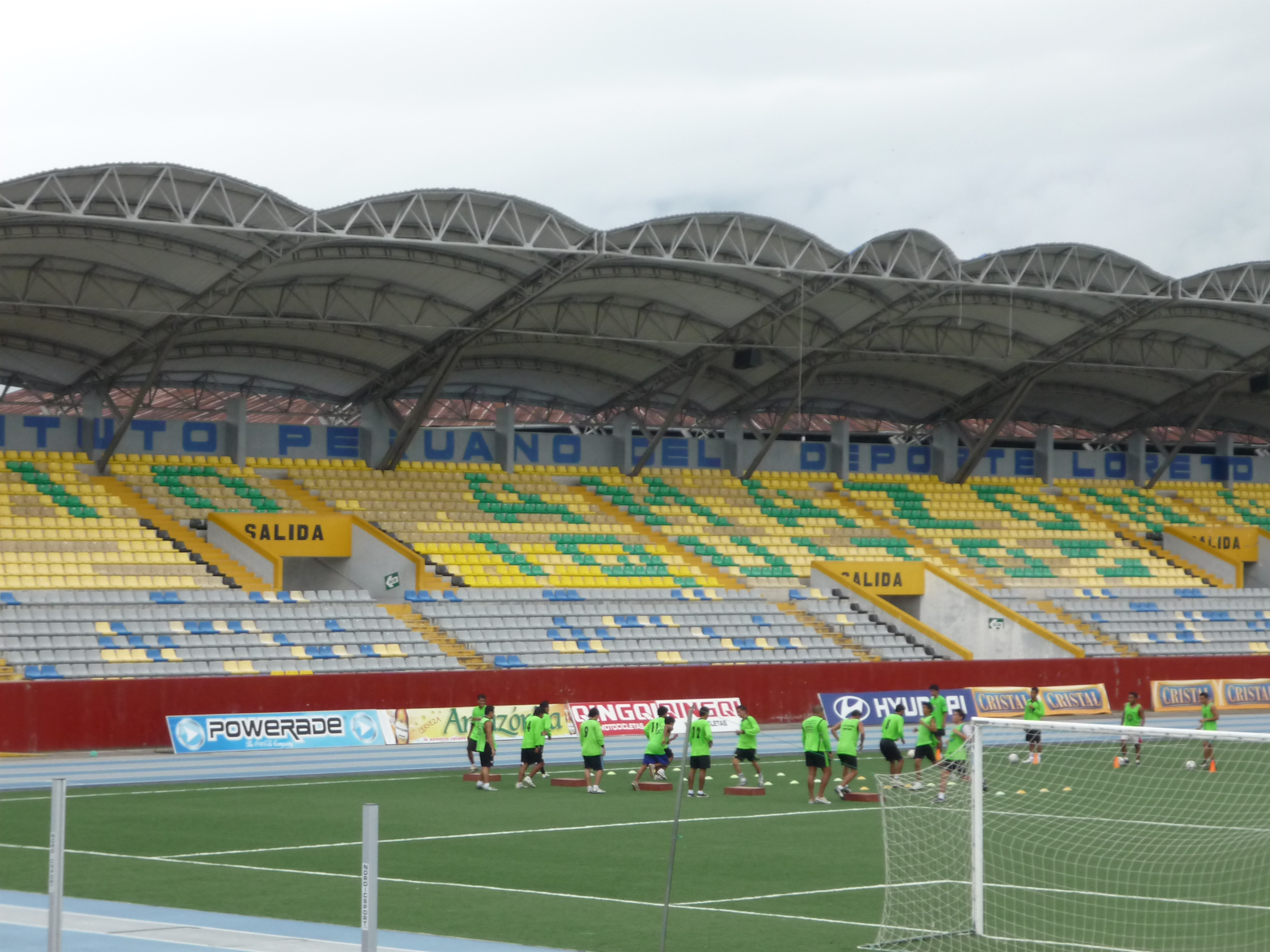
- Interactive map of Estadio Max Augustín
- Full name: Estadio Regional Max Augustín
- Location: Iquitos, Peru
- Owner: Regional government
- Operator: Instituto Peruano del Deporte
- Capacity: 24,576
- Surface: Artificial turf
- Field size: 105 x 68 m

Construction
- Built: 1942
- Opened: 1942
- Renovated: 2005
- Expanded: 2005
- Cost: S/.18,000,000

Tenant
- Colegio Nacional Iquitos

The Estadio Max Augustín is a multi-purpose stadium in Iquitos, Peru. It is the home ground of the football (soccer) team AD Comerciantes FC, of the Peruvian Segunda División along with Colegio Nacional Iquitos and several other Copa Perú teams from Iquitos and the surrounding region. The stadium can accommodate 24,576 people. It was built in 1942 and renovated in 2005. The stadium has artificial turf, an artificial running track, and was a venue in the 2005 FIFA U-17 World Championship.
