= Estadio César Flores Marigorda =

Coordinates: 6.697376510453822°S 79.90452204687574°W

- Interactive map of Estadio César Flores Marigorda
- Full name: Estadio Municipal César Flores Marigorda
- Location: Lambayeque, Peru
- Capacity: 7,000
- Surface: Grass

Construction
- Opened: 1946

Tenants
- FC Carlos Stein & Juan Aurich

Estadio Municipal César Flores Marigorda, locally known as Estadio César Flores Marigorda or Estadio de Lambayeque, is a multi-purpose stadium in Lambayeque, Peru. It is the home ground for FC Carlos Stein and has a capacity of 7,000 spectators. The stadium was opened in 1946. Juan Aurich currently uses the stadium, as their original home ground Estadio Elías Aguirre is currently being renovated.
