= Estadio César Acuña Peralta =

Football stadium in Trujillo, Peru

- Interactive map of Estadio César Acuña Peralta
- Full name: Estadio César Acuña Peralta
- Location: Trujillo, Peru
- Coordinates: 8°01′37″S 79°04′24″W
- Owner: Universidad César Vallejo
- Capacity: 2,000
- Surface: Grass

Construction
- Opened: 12 April 2025

Tenant
- Universidad César Vallejo

Estadio César Acuña Peralta is a football stadium located in Trujillo, Peru. The stadium is owned and is the home ground Peruvian Segunda División club Universidad César Vallejo. Opened on 12 April 2025, the stadium has a capacity of 2,000. It is named after the club owner, César Acuña Peralta.
