= Asociación Club Deportivo Ucrania =

Deportivo Ucrania
- Full name: Asociación Club Deportivo Ucrania
- Founded: June 29, 2017; 8 years ago
- Ground: Estadio IPD de Nueva Cajamarca
- Capacity: 12,000
- Chairman: Luis Núñez Sánchez
- Manager: Carlos López
- League: Liga 3

Asociación Club Deportivo Ucrania, simply known as Deportivo Ucrania, is a Peruvian professional football club based in the city of Nueva Cajamarca, San Martín, Peru. The club plays in the Peruvian Tercera División, the third tier of Peruvian football.

== History ==
Deportivo Ucrania was founded on June 29, 2017 in the town of Ucrania, east of Nueva Cajamarca, and was the departmental champion of San Martín after defeating Biavo in the final.

== Stadium ==
Deportivo Ucrania plays their home games at Estadio IPD de Nueva Cajamarca located in the city of Nueva Cajamarca. Built in 2017, the stadium has a capacity of 12,000.

== Honours ==
=== Senior titles ===
Keys

- Record
- ^{(s)} Shared record

Type	Competition	Titles	Runner-up	Winning years	Runner-up years
Regional (League)	Liga Departamental de San Martín	1	—	2024	—
Regional (League)	Liga Provincial de Rioja	3	—	2017, 2018, 2024	—
Regional (League)	Liga Distrital de Nueva Cajamarca	4	1	2017, 2018, 2023, 2024	2022

== See also ==
- List of football clubs in Peru
- Peruvian football league system
