= 2023 Ligas Departamentales del Perú =

Ligas Departamentales del Peru
- Season: 2023

The 2023 Ligas Departamentales, the fifth division of Peruvian football (soccer), were played by variable number teams by Departament. The champions and runners-up of each department qualified for the national stage of the 2023 Copa Perú.

== Liga Departamental de Amazonas ==
=== First stage ===
Team 1	Agg.	Team 2	1st leg	2nd leg
Universitario (Copallin)	2–10	Bagua Grande	0–2	2–8
Unión Cumba	1–0	Alfonso Ugarte (La Peca)	0–0	1–0
El Rayo de Lamud	1–7	Deportivo Municipal (Jazán)	1–1	0–6
San Felipe de Yambras	2–4	San Juan de Luya	1–0	1–4
Unión Santo Domingo	7–1	Deportivo Amazonas	5–0	2–1
Municipal Unión Omia	0–8	Deportivo Municipal (Chachapoyas)	0–3	0–5

=== Quarterfinals ===
Team 1	Agg.	Team 2	1st leg	2nd leg
Unión Cumba	0–0 (3–2 p)	Bagua Grande	0–0	0–0
Deportivo Municipal (Jazán)	3–3 (5–4 p)	San Juan de Luya	2–2	1–1
Deportivo Municipal (Chachapoyas)	1–1 (2–4 p)	Unión Santo Domingo	1–1	0–0
San Felipe de Yambras	5–6	Defensor Kanus	4–3	1–3

=== Semifinals ===
Team 1	Agg.	Team 2	1st leg	2nd leg
Unión Cumba	1–5	Deportivo Municipal (Jazán)	1–1	0–4
Unión Santo Domingo	14–3	Defensor Kanus	8–2	6–1

=== Final ===
Team 1	Score	Team 2
Unión Santo Domingo	2–0	Deportivo Municipal (Jazán)

== Liga Departamental de Áncash ==
=== First stage ===
Team 1	Agg.	Team 2	1st leg	2nd leg
Caballeros de La Ley	3–4	Deportivo Obraje	2–0	1–4
Juvenil Power	2–12	Star Áncash	1–7	1–5
Estrella Roja	3–4	San Marcos	2–2	1–2
Sport La Libertad	4–2	Buenos Aires	3–0	1–2
La Cruz	5–3	ACD Llampa	4–1	1–2
Transportes Pablito	3–4	Nueva Juventud (Arhuay)	2–3	1–1
Unión Deportivo Huracán	3–2	Atlético Villa Sucre	1–2	2–0
Guillermo Bracale Ramos	5–3	Atlético Dandys	2–1	3–2
Unión Cahua	2–3	Imán Palmira	1–2	1–1
Primavera	2–5	San Andrés de Runtu	1–3	1–2
Atlético Huari	13–2	José Olaya	8–1	5–1
Centro Social Pariacoto	2–2 (7–6 p)	Alianza San Luis	1–0	1–2
Sport Quillo	1–3	Unión Garlero	0–1	1–2
El Chasqui	2–6	Atlético Municipal Mariátegui	0–1	2–5
Atlético Bruces	4–2	Huracán del Norte	3–1	1–1
Juventud 9 de Octubre	1–1 (3–4 p)	Santo Domingo	1–1	0–0

=== Round of 16 ===
Team 1	Agg.	Team 2	1st leg	2nd leg
Deportivo Obraje	0–5	Star Áncash	0–2	0–3
Nueva Juventud (Arhuay)	2–4	Unión Deportivo Huracán	2–3	0–1
Sport La Libertad	3–2	Guillermo Bracale Ramos	3–1	0–1
La Cruz	5–3	Imán Pálmira	4–2	1–2
San Andrés de Runtu	4–3	Atlético Huari	3–0	1–3
Unión Galero	0–2	San Marcos	0–1	0–1
Atlético Municipal Mariátegui	4–2	Atlético Bruces	1–0	3–2
Santo Domingo	1–4	Centro Social Pariacoto	1–3	0–1

=== Quarterfinals ===
Team 1	Agg.	Team 2	1st leg	2nd leg
Unión Deportivo Huracán	1–6	Star Áncash	0–3	1–3
Sport La Libertad	4–4 (6–7 p)	La Cruz	3–1	1–3
San Marcos	2–1	San Andrés de Runtu	1–0	1–1
Atlético Municipal Mariátegui	3–4	Centro Social Pariacoto	2–1	1–3

=== Semifinals ===
Team 1	Agg.	Team 2	1st leg	2nd leg
La Cruz	1–4	Star Áncash	1–4	0–0
Centro Social Pariacoto	3–3 (7–8 p)	San Marcos	2–0	1–3

=== Finals ===
Team 1	Agg.	Team 2	1st leg	2nd leg
San Marcos	4–2	Star Áncash	0–1	4–1

== Liga Departamental de Apurímac ==
=== First stage ===
Team 1	Agg.	Team 2	1st leg	2nd leg
Deportivo Municipal (Miraflores)	0–7	Andahuaylas FC	0–3	0–4
Argama FC	4–0	Defensor Uripa	2–0	2–0
FC Municipal Challhuahuacho	6–1	Deportivo Sulfubamba	2–1	4–0
Deportivo Municipal (Grau)	4–3	FC Municipal Cotabambas	3–1	1–2
Patrón Santiago	4–3	Deportivo Municipal (Antabamba)	2–2	2–1
Halcones de El Oro	2–0	Cultural de Luychupata	0–0	2–0

=== Quarterfinals ===
Team 1	Agg.	Team 2	1st leg	2nd leg
Argama FC	0–1	FC Municipal Challhuahuacho	0–0	0–1
Deportivo Municipal (Grau)	0–3	Andahuaylas FC	0–0	0–3
Patrón Santiago	0–5	Miguel Grau	0–1	0–4
Social El Olivo	7–3	Halcones de El Oro	3–2	4–1

=== Semifinals ===
Team 1	Agg.	Team 2	1st leg	2nd leg
Miguel Grau	2–2 (4–3 p)	Social El Olivo	1–0	1–2
FC Municipal Challhuahuacho	3–2	Andahuaylas FC	3–1	0–1

=== Final ===
Team 1	Score	Team 2
Miguel Grau	1–0	FC Municipal Challhuahuacho

== Liga Departamental de Arequipa ==
=== First stage ===
Team 1	Agg.	Team 2	1st leg	2nd leg
Deportivo Porvenir	1–1 (5–4 p)	Independiente La Real	0–1	1–0
Aurora	11–1	Real Pionero	6–0	5–1
Jorge Chávez	2–2 (4–5 p)	Deportivo Colón	1–1	1–1
Nacional	6–3	José Granda	3–1	3–2
San Juan de Churunga	0–1	Viargoca	0–1	0–0

Pos	Team	Pld	W	D	L	GF	GA	GD	Pts
1	Sportivo Huracán	2	2	0	0	7	0	+7	6
2	Juventud Apacroya	2	1	0	1	4	7	−3	3
3	Defensor Tuti	2	0	0	2	3	7	−4	0

Rules for classification: 1) Points; 2) Goal difference; 3) Goals for; 4) Fair play points; 5) Drawing of lots.

=== Quarterfinals ===
Team 1	Agg.	Team 2	1st leg	2nd leg
Juventud Apacroya	2–10	Aurora	1–4	1–6
Independiente La Real	1–12	Nacional	1–1	0–11
Viargoca	7–3	Deportivo Porvenir	3–1	4–2
Sportivo Huracán	3–0	Deportivo Colón	2–0	1–0

=== Liguilla ===
Pos	Team	Pld	W	D	L	GF	GA	GD	Pts	Qualification or relegation
1	Nacional	3	2	1	0	7	2	+5	7	Advance to 2023 Copa Perú
2	Aurora	3	2	1	0	6	2	+4	7	Advance to 2023 Copa Perú
3	Sportivo Huracán	3	1	0	2	3	5	−2	3	
4	Viargoca	3	0	0	3	0	7	−7	0	

Rules for classification: 1) Points; 2) Goal difference; 3) Goals for; 4) Fair play points; 5) Drawing of lots.

== Liga Departamental de Ayacucho ==
=== First stage ===
Team 1	Agg.	Team 2	1st leg	2nd leg
Player Villafuerte	6–2	Sport Cuculi	2–0	4–2
FC Tambo	4–1	Social San Isidro	2–0	2–1
San Pedro de Chilcayoc	5–10	Sport Cáceres	3–5	2–5
VRAEM FC	2–1	San José de Sucre	1–0	1–1
Deportivo Municipal (Cotay)	5–2	San José de Huarcaya	2–2	3–0
San Juan de Chito	2–4	Atlético Mariscal de Huamanguilla	1–4	1–0
Sol Naciente	0–6	Defensor Yuraccyacu	0–3	0–3
Atlético Patahuasi	5–1	FC Los Morochucos	4–0	1–1
Defensor Coris	1–3	Nueva Generación	1–0	0–3
Social Cóndor	1–7	Deportivo Emergencia	1–4	0–3

=== Second stage ===
Team 1	Agg.	Team 2	1st leg	2nd leg
FC Tambo	3–0	Deportivo Emergencia	3–0	0–0
Sport Cáceres	2–1	Player Villafuerte	1–0	1–1
VRAEM FC	5–0	Deportivo Municipal (Cotay)	3–0	2–0
Atlético Mariscal de Huamanguilla	2–2 (6–7 p)	Defensor Yuraccyacu	0–0	2–2
Nueva Generación	1–2	Atlético Patahuasi	0–1	1–1

=== Third stage ===
Team 1	Agg.	Team 2	1st leg	2nd leg
FC Tambo	2–9	Sport Cáceres	0–1	2–8
VRAEM FC	3–3 (1–4 p)	Defensor Yuraccyacu	2–1	1–2
Atlético Patahuasi	2–0	Atlético Mariscal de Huamanguilla	2–0	0–0

=== Semifinals ===
Team 1	Agg.	Team 2	1st leg	2nd leg
Sport Cáceres	7–1	Defensor Yuraccyacu	4–0	3–1
Atlético Patahuasi	1–2	VRAEM FC	1–0	0–2

=== Final ===
Team 1	Score	Team 2
Sport Cáceres	1–0	VRAEM FC

== Liga Departamental de Cajamarca ==
=== First stage ===
Team 1	Agg.	Team 2	1st leg	2nd leg
Defensor Michiquillay	2–2 (4–3 p)	Real San Marcos	1–1	1–1
Sport Rayo Ichocán	3–10	Cajamarca	2–7	1–3
ADA Cajabamba	3–2	Sport El Milagro	3–0	0–2
Unión Agrícola Agua Santa	2–0	Dos de Mayo	2–0	0–0
Joaquín Bernal	4–0	Nuevo Tiempo	1–0	3–0
Juventud Tunasloma	0–3	Cultural Volante	0–1	0–2
ADA	8–1	Unión San Ignacio	6–1	2–0
Estrella Roja	4–3	Señor Cautivo	2–0	2–3
Deportivo Amallita	2–2 (4–5 p)	Defensor Cruceño	1–1	1–1
La Pauquilla	1–9	Deportivo Chota	1–6	0–3
El Rayo	3–3 (5–4 p)	Familia Verástegui	3–1	0–2
Deportivo Municipal (Tumbadén)	5–3	Sánchez Carrión	5–1	0–2
Defensor Tembladera	0–8	Rosario Celendín	0–3	0–5

=== Second stage ===
Team 1	Agg.	Team 2	1st leg	2nd leg
Rosario Celendín	3–3 (2–4 p)	Colonia Tongodina	3–2	0–1
El Rayo	1–7	Cajamarca	1–3	0–4
Defensor Michiquillay	0–5	ADA Cajabamba	0–1	0–4
Unión Agrícola Agua Santa	3–3 (4–2 p)	Deportivo Chota	3–1	0–2
Deportivo Municipal (Tumbadén)	0–3	Joaquín Bernal	0–0	0–3
Defensor Cruceño	0–8	ADA	0–2	0–6
Estrella Roja	0–6	Cultural Volante	0–1	0–5

=== Third stage ===
Team 1	Agg.	Team 2	1st leg	2nd leg
Colonia Tongodina	3–6	ADA Cajabamba	2–3	1–3
Cultural Volante	2–2 (3–4 p)	Cajamarca	2–0	0–2
Unión Agrícola Agua Santa	2–3	ADA	1–0	1–3
Deportivo Chota	6–6 (4–3 p)	Joaquín Bernal	5–4	1–2

=== Semifinals ===
Team 1	Agg.	Team 2	1st leg	2nd leg
Cajamarca	8–1	ADA Cajabamba	5–1	3–0
Deportivo Chota	3–4	ADA	3–2	0–2

== Liga Departamental del Callao ==
=== Group stage ===
==== Group A ====
Pos	Team	Pld	W	D	L	GF	GA	GD	Pts	Qualification or relegation
1	Juvenud Palmeiras	6	5	0	1	17	4	+13	15	Advance to 2023 Copa Perú
2	Defensor Todos Unidos	6	4	2	0	16	8	+8	14	
3	Cultural Centella	6	1	4	1	6	7	−1	7	
4	ADC Callao	5	2	0	3	6	8	−2	6	
5	AEB	6	1	2	3	11	16	−5	5	
6	Zurgol (Note: Zurgol were deducted one point.)	6	1	3	2	9	11	−2	5	
7	Carlos Anglas	5	0	1	4	4	15	−11	1	

Rules for classification: 1) Points; 2) Goal difference; 3) Goals for; 4) Fair play points; 5) Drawing of lots.

==== Group B ====
Pos	Team	Pld	W	D	L	GF	GA	GD	Pts	Qualification or relegation
1	Calidad Porteña	6	4	2	0	10	1	+9	14	Advance to 2023 Copa Perú
2	Chalaca FC	6	3	2	1	9	2	+7	11	
3	Atlético Pilsen Callao	6	3	2	1	7	6	+1	11	
4	ADEBAMI	6	3	1	2	8	9	−1	10	
5	Atlético Sullana	6	2	1	3	13	10	+3	7	
6	León de Juda	5	0	1	4	3	13	−10	1	
7	JOB 05 (Note: JOB 05 were deducted six points for walkovers.)	5	0	1	4	5	13	−8	−5	

Rules for classification: 1) Points; 2) Goal difference; 3) Goals for; 4) Fair play points; 5) Drawing of lots.

=== Final ===
Team 1	Score	Team 2
Calidad Porteña	0–0 (6–5 p)	Juventud Palmeiras

== Liga Departamental de Cusco ==
=== Group Stage ===
==== Group A ====
Pos	Team	Pld	W	D	L	GF	GA	GD	Pts
1	Sporting Ccori	6	4	1	1	11	8	+3	13
2	Juventud Progreso	6	4	0	2	7	3	+4	12
3	Nuestra Señora del Carmen	6	2	0	4	7	11	−4	6
4	Deportivo Municipal (Canas)	6	1	1	4	6	9	−3	4

Rules for classification: 1) Points; 2) Goal difference; 3) Goals for; 4) Fair play points; 5) Drawing of lots.

==== Group B ====
Pos	Team	Pld	W	D	L	GF	GA	GD	Pts
1	Real Municipal	6	4	2	0	9	1	+8	14
2	Kiara Romina	6	2	2	2	11	10	+1	8
3	Defensor Agropecuario	6	1	3	2	6	7	−1	6
4	San Cristóbal de Rahuanqui	6	1	1	4	4	12	−8	4

Rules for classification: 1) Points; 2) Goal difference; 3) Goals for; 4) Fair play points; 5) Drawing of lots.

==== Group C ====
Pos	Team	Pld	W	D	L	GF	GA	GD	Pts
1	AJI	6	4	2	0	12	3	+9	14
2	Sol Naciente	6	3	1	2	11	6	+5	10
3	Deportivo Huracán (Tihuicty)	6	2	3	1	6	6	0	9
4	Atlético Quisini	6	0	0	6	3	17	−14	0

Rules for classification: 1) Points; 2) Goal difference; 3) Goals for; 4) Fair play points; 5) Drawing of lots.

==== Group D ====
Pos	Team	Pld	W	D	L	GF	GA	GD	Pts
1	Santa Rosa de Anta	6	3	1	2	9	8	+1	10
2	Pluma de Oro	6	3	1	2	7	6	+1	10
3	Gómez Perú	6	2	1	3	8	9	−1	7
4	Corazón Chequeño	6	2	1	3	7	8	−1	7

Rules for classification: 1) Points; 2) Goal difference; 3) Goals for; 4) Fair play points; 5) Drawing of lots.

===== Tiebreaker =====
Team 1	Score	Team 2
Pluma de Oro	1–0	Santa Rosa de Anta

==== Group E ====
Pos	Team	Pld	W	D	L	GF	GA	GD	Pts
1	Centenario FC	6	3	2	1	5	2	+3	11
2	Deportivo Municipal (La Convención)	6	2	2	2	10	8	+2	8
3	Nuevo Amanecer	6	2	1	3	8	9	−1	7
4	Juventud de Huaynapata	6	2	1	3	4	8	−4	7

Rules for classification: 1) Points; 2) Goal difference; 3) Goals for; 4) Fair play points; 5) Drawing of lots.

==== Group F ====
Pos	Team	Pld	W	D	L	GF	GA	GD	Pts
1	Defensor Cubillas	6	4	1	1	14	6	+8	13
2	Señor Justo Juez	6	3	3	0	13	4	+9	12
3	Deportivo Qquehuar	6	1	2	3	5	10	−5	5
4	Leones de Molle Molle	6	1	0	5	6	18	−12	3

Rules for classification: 1) Points; 2) Goal difference; 3) Goals for; 4) Fair play points; 5) Drawing of lots.

=== Quarterfinals ===
Team 1	Agg.	Team 2	1st leg	2nd leg
Real Municipal	8–1	Sporting Ccori	5–0	3–1
AJI	3–2	Juventud Progreso	2–1	1–1
Centenario FC	0–2	Pluma de Oro	0–1	0–1
Señor Justo Juez	0–3	Defensor Cubillas	0–1	0–2

=== Semifinals ===
Team 1	Agg.	Team 2	1st leg	2nd leg
AJI	2–1	Real Municipal	2–0	0–1
Defensor Cubillas	3–0	Pluma de Oro	2–0	1–0

=== Final ===
Team 1	Score	Team 2
AJI	2–1	Defensor Cubillas

== Liga Departamental de Huancavelica ==
=== First Stage ===
Team 1	Agg.	Team 2	1st leg	2nd leg
Diablos Rojos	10–1	Defensor Choclococha	6–1	4–0
Dos de Mayo	0–7	Deportivo Vianney	0–1	0–6
UDA Allato	1–2	San Juan Pilpichaca	1–1	0–1
San Juan Bautista Huaytara	4–2	Social Lircay	3–0	1–2

=== Liguilla ===
Pos	Team	Pld	W	D	L	GF	GA	GD	Pts	Qualification or relegation
1	Deportivo Vianney	6	5	1	0	14	5	+9	16	Advance to 2023 Copa Perú
2	Diablos Rojos	6	3	2	1	19	11	+8	11	Advance to 2023 Copa Perú
3	San Juan Bautista Huaytara	6	2	0	4	10	17	−7	6	
4	San Juan Pilpichaca	6	0	1	5	6	16	−10	1	

Rules for classification: 1) Points; 2) Goal difference; 3) Goals for; 4) Fair play points; 5) Drawing of lots.

== Liga Departamental de Huánuco ==
=== First stage ===
Team 1	Agg.	Team 2	1st leg	2nd leg
Construcción Civil	4–3	Cervantes FC	2–2	2–1
ADT Tashga	1–11	Independiente de Huachog	1–7	0–4
UNAS	1–6	Juventud La Palma (Tocache)	1–3	0–3
Porongo	1–8	Auca FC	0–6	1–2
Municipal FC	4–7	Deportivo Verdecocha	1–1	3–6
Antonio Ketin Vidal	11–5	Javier Pulgar Vidal	6–2	5–3
Real Montevideo	0–14	Castle FC	0–7	0–7
Real Ambo FC	4–2	Unión Chaglla	2–1	2–1

=== Quarterfinals ===
Team 1	Agg.	Team 2	1st leg	2nd leg
Real Ambo FC	1–0	Auca FC	1–0	0–0
Antonio Ketin Vidal	1–1 (4–5 p)	Juventud La Palma (Tocache)	1–1	0–0
Construcción Civil	0–2	Castle FC	0–2	0–0
Independiente de Huachog	2–1	Deportivo Verdecocha	1–0	1–1

=== Semifinals ===
Team 1	Agg.	Team 2	1st leg	2nd leg
Real Ambo FC	2–6	Independiente de Huachog	2–2	0–4
Juventud La Palma (Tocache)	1–6	Castle FC	0–2	1–4

=== Finals ===
Team 1	Agg.	Team 2	1st leg	2nd leg
Castle FC	2–4	Independiente de Huachog	2–4	0–0

== Liga Departamental de Ica ==
=== First stage ===
Team 1	Agg.	Team 2	1st leg	2nd leg
Deportivo Puquio	2–8	José Olaya	1–3	1–5
Cultural Melchorita	1–1 (4–3 p)	Lolo Fernández	0–1	1–0
Deportivo Primavera	1–2	América de Palpa	1–1	0–1
Barcelona (Parcona)	2–3	Alianza Pisco	1–1	1–2
Los Gatos	1–3	18 de Febrero	1–1	0–2
San Pedro	0–0 (7–8 p)	Amigos de San Luis	0–0	0–0

=== Quarterfinals ===
Team 1	Agg.	Team 2	1st leg	2nd leg
José Olaya	2–3	18 de Febrero	2–2	0–1
América de Palpa	2–0	Cultural Melchorita	1–0	1–0
San Pedro	0–2	Lolo Fernández	0–1	0–1
Amigos de San Luis	2–6	Alianza Pisco	2–5	0–1

=== Semifinals ===
Team 1	Agg.	Team 2	1st leg	2nd leg
América de Palpa	0–3	Alianza Pisco	0–1	0–2
18 de Febrero	1–1 (2–4 p)	Lolo Fernández	1–0	0–1

=== Final ===
Team 1	Score	Team 2
Alianza Pisco	2–2 (5–4 p)	Lolo Fernández

== Liga Departamental de Junín ==
=== Group Stage ===
==== Group A ====
Pos	Team	Pld	W	D	L	GF	GA	GD	Pts
1	Sport Gavilán	3	2	1	0	7	3	+4	7
2	Sport Cóndor	3	1	1	1	5	3	+2	4
3	Deportivo Municipal (Ahuaycha)	3	1	1	1	1	1	0	4
4	Sport Bolognesi	3	0	1	2	3	9	−6	1

Rules for classification: 1) Points; 2) Goal difference; 3) Goals for; 4) Fair play points; 5) Drawing of lots.

==== Group B ====
Pos	Team	Pld	W	D	L	GF	GA	GD	Pts
1	Juventud Apatina	3	3	0	0	8	2	+6	9
2	Unión Sangani	3	1	1	1	4	5	−1	4
3	Echa Lolo	3	0	2	1	2	4	−2	2
4	Unión San Cristobal	3	0	1	2	5	8	−3	1

Rules for classification: 1) Points; 2) Goal difference; 3) Goals for; 4) Fair play points; 5) Drawing of lots.

==== Group C ====
Pos	Team	Pld	W	D	L	GF	GA	GD	Pts
1	Atlético Chanchamayo	3	2	1	0	16	1	+15	7
2	Defensor Concepción	3	2	1	0	5	2	+3	7
3	Sport Dos de Mayo	3	1	0	2	3	4	−1	3
4	Los Milagros	3	0	0	3	0	17	−17	0

Rules for classification: 1) Points; 2) Goal difference; 3) Goals for; 4) Fair play points; 5) Drawing of lots.

==== Group D ====
Pos	Team	Pld	W	D	L	GF	GA	GD	Pts
1	CESA	4	2	2	0	5	1	+4	8
2	Estrella Central	4	1	3	0	4	1	+3	6
3	AD Santo Domingo	4	2	0	2	4	6	−2	6
4	AD Pucará	4	1	1	2	2	4	−2	4
5	Bayern Llanco	4	0	2	2	1	4	−3	2

Rules for classification: 1) Points; 2) Goal difference; 3) Goals for; 4) Fair play points; 5) Drawing of lots.

==== Group E ====
Pos	Team	Pld	W	D	L	GF	GA	GD	Pts
1	Santa María	3	2	1	0	7	1	+6	7
2	Unión Pilcomayo	3	2	1	0	3	1	+2	7
3	Deportivo Municipal (Oroya)	3	1	0	2	5	3	+2	3
4	Academia Municipal	3	0	0	3	3	13	−10	0

Rules for classification: 1) Points; 2) Goal difference; 3) Goals for; 4) Fair play points; 5) Drawing of lots.

=== Second stage ===
==== Group A ====
Pos	Team	Pld	W	D	L	GF	GA	GD	Pts
1	CESA	3	2	1	0	7	1	+6	7
2	Atlético Chanchamayo	3	2	0	1	3	3	0	6
3	Sport Cóndor	3	1	1	1	5	3	+2	4
4	AD Santo Domingo	3	0	0	3	0	6	−6	0

Rules for classification: 1) Points; 2) Goal difference; 3) Goals for; 4) Fair play points; 5) Drawing of lots.

==== Group B ====
Pos	Team	Pld	W	D	L	GF	GA	GD	Pts
1	Unión Pilcomayo	3	1	2	0	8	5	+3	5
2	Defensor Concepción	3	1	2	0	6	4	+2	5
3	Sport Gavilán	3	0	3	0	2	2	0	3
4	Deportivo Municipal (Ahuaycha)	3	0	1	2	3	8	−5	1

Rules for classification: 1) Points; 2) Goal difference; 3) Goals for; 4) Fair play points; 5) Drawing of lots.

===== Tiebreaker =====
Team 1	Score	Team 2
Unión Pilcomayo	0–0 (2–4 p)	Defensor Concepción

==== Group C ====
Pos	Team	Pld	W	D	L	GF	GA	GD	Pts
1	Juventud Apatina	3	2	1	0	6	0	+6	7
2	Estrella Central	3	1	2	0	3	1	+2	5
3	Santa María	3	0	2	1	1	4	−3	2
4	Unión Sangani	3	0	1	2	2	7	−5	1

Rules for classification: 1) Points; 2) Goal difference; 3) Goals for; 4) Fair play points; 5) Drawing of lots.

=== Liguilla ===
Pos	Team	Pld	W	D	L	GF	GA	GD	Pts	Qualification or relegation
1	CESA	3	2	1	0	4	2	+2	7	Advance to 2023 Copa Perú
2	Atlético Chanchamayo	3	2	0	1	4	3	+1	6	Advance to 2023 Copa Perú
3	Juventud Apatina	3	1	0	2	3	4	−1	3	
4	Defensor Concepción	3	0	1	2	2	4	−2	1	

Rules for classification: 1) Points; 2) Goal difference; 3) Goals for; 4) Fair play points; 5) Drawing of lots.

== Liga Departamental de La Libertad ==
=== Zona Costa ===
==== Group A ====
Pos	Team	Pld	W	D	L	GF	GA	GD	Pts
1	Alfonso Ugarte de Chiclín	6	5	1	0	15	2	+13	16
2	Agrosa Cultambo	6	1	4	1	8	8	0	7
3	Ángel Avilés	6	1	2	3	6	8	−2	5
4	San Vicente de Pueblo Nuevo	6	1	1	4	7	18	−11	4

Rules for classification: 1) Points; 2) Goal difference; 3) Goals for; 4) Fair play points; 5) Drawing of lots.

==== Group B ====
Pos	Team	Pld	W	D	L	GF	GA	GD	Pts
1	El Inca	3	2	1	0	10	1	+9	7
2	Juventud Unión Chequén	4	1	1	2	4	10	−6	4
3	Deportivo Magaru	3	0	2	1	0	3	−3	2

Rules for classification: 1) Points; 2) Goal difference; 3) Goals for; 4) Fair play points; 5) Drawing of lots.

==== Group C ====
Pos	Team	Pld	W	D	L	GF	GA	GD	Pts
1	Defensor Porvenir	4	3	0	1	8	5	+3	9
2	Atlético Verdún	4	1	1	2	4	4	0	4
3	Comunal San José	4	1	1	2	6	9	−3	4

Rules for classification: 1) Points; 2) Goal difference; 3) Goals for; 4) Fair play points; 5) Drawing of lots.

=== Zona Ande ===
Pos	Team	Pld	W	D	L	GF	GA	GD	Pts
1	San Pedro del Valle	6	4	0	2	13	5	+8	12
2	Unión Pataz	6	3	0	3	17	9	+8	9
3	Unión Huamachuco	6	3	0	3	9	14	−5	9
4	Deportivo Sausacocha	6	2	0	4	5	16	−11	6

Rules for classification: 1) Points; 2) Goal difference; 3) Goals for; 4) Fair play points; 5) Drawing of lots.

==== Tiebreaker ====
Team 1	Score	Team 2
Unión Huamachuco	2–1	Unión Pataz

=== Quarterfinals ===
Team 1	Agg.	Team 2	1st leg	2nd leg
Alfonso Ugarte de Chiclín	3–3 (4–3 p)	El Inca	3–1	0–2
Defensor Porvenir	6–1	Agrosa Cultambo	2–1	4–0

=== Liguilla ===
Pos	Team	Pld	W	D	L	GF	GA	GD	Pts	Qualification or relegation
1	Defensor Porvenir	6	3	2	1	20	9	+11	11	Advance to 2023 Copa Perú
2	Alfonso Ugarte de Chiclín	6	3	1	2	17	13	+4	10	Advance to 2023 Copa Perú
3	San Pedro del Valle	6	3	1	2	11	12	−1	10	
4	Unión Huamachuco	6	1	0	5	8	22	−14	3	

Rules for classification: 1) Points; 2) Goal difference; 3) Goals for; 4) Fair play points; 5) Drawing of lots.

==== Tiebreaker ====
Team 1	Score	Team 2
Alfonso Ugarte de Chiclín	1–0	San Pedro del Valle

== Liga Departamental de Lambayeque ==
=== Group stage ===
==== Group A ====
Pos	Team	Pld	W	D	L	GF	GA	GD	Pts
1	Toribia Castro	3	2	0	1	4	1	+3	6
2	Juventud La Joya	3	1	1	1	3	3	0	4
3	Jesús Monterroso	3	1	1	1	5	6	−1	4
4	Alianza Vista Alegre	3	0	2	1	4	6	−2	2

Rules for classification: 1) Points; 2) Goal difference; 3) Goals for; 4) Fair play points; 5) Drawing of lots.

===== Tiebreaker =====
Team 1	Score	Team 2
Jesús Monterroso	0–0 (2–4 p)	Juventud La Joya

==== Group B ====
Pos	Team	Pld	W	D	L	GF	GA	GD	Pts
1	Boca Juniors	3	1	2	0	8	4	+4	5
2	Deportivo Lute	3	1	2	0	7	3	+4	5
3	Vasco da Gama	3	1	2	0	8	6	+2	5
4	Genaro Fuentes Linares	3	0	0	3	3	13	−10	0

Rules for classification: 1) Points; 2) Goal difference; 3) Goals for; 4) Fair play points; 5) Drawing of lots.

===== Tiebreaker =====
Team 1	Score	Team 2
Deportivo Lute	1–1 (2–4 p)	Vasco da Gama

==== Group C ====
Pos	Team	Pld	W	D	L	GF	GA	GD	Pts
1	Manuel Gonzáles Prada	3	2	1	0	4	1	+3	7
2	Unión Atahualpa	3	1	1	1	5	4	+1	4
3	América de Tepo	3	1	0	2	4	5	−1	3
4	Alianza Santa Isabel	3	1	0	2	3	6	−3	3

Rules for classification: 1) Points; 2) Goal difference; 3) Goals for; 4) Fair play points; 5) Drawing of lots.

==== Group D ====
Pos	Team	Pld	W	D	L	GF	GA	GD	Pts
1	Juan Pablo II College	3	2	1	0	4	2	+2	7
2	Cruz de Chalpón	3	1	2	0	3	2	+1	5
3	Intocables FC	3	0	2	1	4	5	−1	2
4	Rayos X Medicina	3	0	1	2	4	6	−2	1

Rules for classification: 1) Points; 2) Goal difference; 3) Goals for; 4) Fair play points; 5) Drawing of lots.

=== Quarterfinals ===
Team 1	Agg.	Team 2	1st leg	2nd leg
Toribia Castro	4–4 (2–4 p)	Boca Juniors	2–2	2–2
Unión Atahualpa	1–3	Juan Pablo II College	1–0	0–3
Cruz de Chalpón	3–2	Manuel Gonzáles Prada	2–1	1–1
Juventud La Joya	2–0	Vasco da Gama	0–0	2–0

=== Semifinals ===
Team 1	Agg.	Team 2	1st leg	2nd leg
Boca Juniors	1–3	Juventud La Joya	1–3	0–0
Cruz de Chalpón	1–2 (2–3 p)	Juan Pablo II College	0–2	1–0

=== Final ===
Team 1	Score	Team 2
Juan Pablo II College	2–1	Juventud La Joya

== Liga Departamental de Lima ==
- A total of 16 teams compete in the tournament, which began on 23 July and is scheduled to end on 3 September 2023.

=== Round of 16 ===
Team 1	Agg.	Team 2	1st leg	2nd leg
Huarochirí FC	1–3	Nueva Generación	1–1	0–2
Ángeles Negros	3–5	Maristas	1–2	2–3
AIPSA	0–3	José de San Martín	0–1	0–2
Juventud Cruz de Chonta	1–1 (5–4 p)	Sport Santa Rosa	2–1	0–1
Defensor Laure Sur	2–1	Walter Ormeño	2–0	0–1
El Diamante	1–3	AFE Cosmos International	0–1	1–2
San Lorenzo de Porococha	1–3	Deportivo Huracán	1–1	0–2
Barranco City	6–3	Atlético Tingo María	4–3	2–0

=== Quarterfinals ===
Team 1	Agg.	Team 2	1st leg	2nd leg
Maristas	3–1	Nueva Generación	3–1	0–0
Juventud Cruz de Chonta	1–1 (3–2 p)	José de San Martín	1–1	0–0
Defensor Laure Sur	3–4	AFE Cosmos International	2–1	1–3
Deportivo Huracán	1–1 (4–2 p)	Barranco City	1–0	0–1

=== Semifinals ===
Team 1	Agg.	Team 2	1st leg	2nd leg
Maristas	1 –0	Juventud Cruz de Chonta	1–0	0–0
Deportivo Huracán	2–1	AFE Cosmos International	0–0	2–1

=== Final ===
Team 1	Score	Team 2
Maristas	1–2	Deportivo Huracán

== Liga Departamental de Loreto ==
=== Sede Requena ===
==== Group A ====
Pos	Team	Pld	W	D	L	GF	GA	GD	Pts
1	Atlético Hospital	3	3	0	0	8	1	+7	9
2	Pascual Alegre	3	2	0	1	6	1	+5	6
3	Deportivo Municipal (San Pablo)	3	1	0	2	5	9	−4	3
4	Deportivo Putumayo	3	0	0	3	1	9	−8	0

Rules for classification: 1) Points; 2) Goal difference; 3) Goals for; 4) Fair play points; 5) Drawing of lots.

==== Group B ====
Pos	Team	Pld	W	D	L	GF	GA	GD	Pts
1	Defensor Tarapacá	3	2	1	0	9	2	+7	7
2	Deportivo Caballo Cocha	2	1	1	0	2	1	+1	4
3	Genaro Herrera	3	1	0	2	5	5	0	3
4	Atlético Estrecho	2	0	0	2	1	9	−8	0

Rules for classification: 1) Points; 2) Goal difference; 3) Goals for; 4) Fair play points; 5) Drawing of lots.

==== Tiebreaker ====
Team 1	Score	Team 2
Defensor Tarapacá	1–0	Deportivo Caballo Cocha

=== Sede Datem del Marañón ===
==== Group A ====
Pos	Team	Pld	W	D	L	GF	GA	GD	Pts
1	PCR Ex 160	3	3	0	0	6	3	+3	9
2	Deportivo Municipal (Nauta)	3	1	1	1	4	3	+1	4
3	Estudiantil CNI	3	1	1	1	4	4	0	4
4	Salud Datem	3	0	0	3	2	6	−4	0

Rules for classification: 1) Points; 2) Goal difference; 3) Goals for; 4) Fair play points; 5) Drawing of lots.

==== Group B ====
Pos	Team	Pld	W	D	L	GF	GA	GD	Pts
1	Deportivo Awajún	3	2	1	0	6	2	+4	7
2	AD Punchana	3	2	0	1	3	2	+1	6
3	San Felipe	3	1	0	2	4	7	−3	3
4	Sport Melgar	3	0	1	2	4	6	−2	1

Rules for classification: 1) Points; 2) Goal difference; 3) Goals for; 4) Fair play points; 5) Drawing of lots.

=== Liguilla ===
Pos	Team	Pld	W	D	L	GF	GA	GD	Pts	Qualification or relegation
1	Atlético Hospital	3	2	1	0	9	4	+5	7	Advance to 2023 Copa Perú
2	PCR Ex 160	3	2	1	0	6	2	+4	7	Advance to 2023 Copa Perú
3	Defensor Tarapacá	3	1	0	2	2	6	−4	3	
4	Deportivo Awajún	3	0	0	3	2	7	−5	0	

Rules for classification: 1) Points; 2) Goal difference; 3) Goals for; 4) Fair play points; 5) Drawing of lots.

==== Tiebreaker ====
Team 1	Score	Team 2
PCR Ex 160	2–2 (4–5 p)	Atlético Hospital

== Liga Departamental de Madre de Dios ==
=== Semifinals ===
Team 1	Agg.	Team 2	1st leg	2nd leg
La Masía Nace	2–2	Hospital Santa Rosa	2–1	0–1
Atlético Iberia	3–4	Real Atlético Nueva	1–1	2–3

== Liga Departamental de Moquegua ==
=== Standings ===
Pos	Team	Pld	W	D	L	GF	GA	GD	Pts	Qualification or relegation
1	UCV Moquegua	5	3	1	1	10	5	+5	10	Advance to 2023 Copa Perú
2	Hijos del Altiplano y del Pacífico	5	3	1	1	9	5	+4	10	Advance to 2023 Copa Perú
3	Barrio 12	5	1	2	2	7	10	−3	5	
4	Mariscal Nieto	5	1	0	4	4	10	−6	3	

Rules for classification: 1) Points; 2) Goal difference; 3) Goals for; 4) Fair play points; 5) Drawing of lots.

=== Final ===
Team 1	Score	Team 2
Hijos del Altiplano y del Pacífico	1–0	UCV Moquegua

== Liga Departamental de Pasco ==
=== First Stage ===
Team 1	Agg.	Team 2	1st leg	2nd leg
Social Constitución	3–6	Juventud Municipal	2–0	1–6
UNDAC	2–2 (4–3 p)	Columna Pasco	2–1	0–1
Sociedad Tiro 28	4–2	Academia Pepe	2–0	2–1

=== Semifinals ===
Team 1	Agg.	Team 2	1st leg	2nd leg
UNDAC	1–14	Ecosem Pasco	1–6	0–8
Sociedad Tiro 28	2–1	Juventud Municipal	1–1	1–0

=== Finals ===
Team 1	Agg.	Team 2	1st leg	2nd leg
Sociedad Tiro 28	2–5	Ecosem Pasco	0–2	2–3

== Liga Departamental de Piura ==
=== Group Stage ===
==== Group A ====
Pos	Team	Pld	W	D	L	GF	GA	GD	Pts
1	Olimpia	6	5	1	0	18	4	+14	16
2	5 de Febrero	6	3	2	1	12	9	+3	11
3	Sport Yanayacu	6	2	1	3	10	18	−8	7
4	Ramón Castilla	6	0	0	6	8	20	−12	0

Rules for classification: 1) Points; 2) Goal difference; 3) Goals for; 4) Fair play points; 5) Drawing of lots.

==== Group B ====
Pos	Team	Pld	W	D	L	GF	GA	GD	Pts
1	Deportivo Municipal (Vice)	6	4	1	1	8	4	+4	13
2	Semillero Tambogrande	6	3	1	2	9	2	+7	10
3	Barcelona	6	3	1	2	9	6	+3	10
4	Alianza La Villa	6	0	2	4	1	15	−14	2

Rules for classification: 1) Points; 2) Goal difference; 3) Goals for; 4) Fair play points; 5) Drawing of lots.

==== Group C ====
Pos	Team	Pld	W	D	L	GF	GA	GD	Pts
1	Academia Cristo Rey	6	3	2	1	18	10	+8	11
2	Caysa Yapatera	6	3	2	1	14	7	+7	11
3	Juan Noel	6	2	2	2	17	11	+6	8
4	Daniel Turley	6	0	2	4	2	23	−21	2

Rules for classification: 1) Points; 2) Goal difference; 3) Goals for; 4) Fair play points; 5) Drawing of lots.

==== Tiebreaker ====
Team 1	Score	Team 2
Cristo Rey	0–3	Caysa Yapatera

==== Group D ====
Pos	Team	Pld	W	D	L	GF	GA	GD	Pts
1	Juventud Bellavista	4	2	2	0	9	4	+5	8
2	Los Halcones	4	1	3	0	7	4	+3	6
3	Atlético Nelly Star	4	0	1	3	4	12	−8	1

Rules for classification: 1) Points; 2) Goal difference; 3) Goals for; 4) Fair play points; 5) Drawing of lots.

==== Group E ====
Pos	Team	Pld	W	D	L	GF	GA	GD	Pts
1	José Gálvez (Pampa de Loro)	4	2	1	1	5	4	+1	7
2	Barrio Piura	4	2	0	2	4	5	−1	6
3	Nueva Juventud Santa Rosa	4	1	1	2	6	6	0	4

Rules for classification: 1) Points; 2) Goal difference; 3) Goals for; 4) Fair play points; 5) Drawing of lots.

==== Tiebreaker ====
Team 1	Score	Team 2
Barrio Piura	1–3	Los Halcones

=== Quarterfinals ===
Team 1	Agg.	Team 2	1st leg	2nd leg
Los Halcones	1–6	Olimpia	0–2	1–4
Academia Cristo Rey	6–6 (5–4 p)	Deportivo Municipal (Vice)	5–2	1–4
José Gálvez	2–2 (5–4 p)	Caysa Yapatera	2–2	0–0
5 de Febrero	3–7	Juventud Bellavista	2–2	1–5

=== Semifinals ===
Team 1	Agg.	Team 2	1st leg	2nd leg
José Gálvez	1–3	Olimpia	1–2	0–1
Juventud Bellavista	4–4 (2–4 p)	Academia Cristo Rey	4–2	0–2

=== Final ===
Team 1	Score	Team 2
Olimpia	2–1	Academia Cristo Rey

== Liga Departamental de Puno ==
=== Group Stage ===
==== Group A ====
Pos	Team	Pld	W	D	L	GF	GA	GD	Pts
1	UDE Los Próceres	6	4	1	1	18	5	+13	13
2	Diablos Rojos	6	3	3	0	14	8	+6	12
3	Melgarcito Junior	6	2	2	2	10	7	+3	8
4	José Gálvez (Yunguyo)	6	0	0	6	2	24	−22	0

Rules for classification: 1) Points; 2) Goal difference; 3) Goals for; 4) Fair play points; 5) Drawing of lots.

==== Group B ====
Pos	Team	Pld	W	D	L	GF	GA	GD	Pts
1	Unión Ángeles de Vizcachani	6	4	0	2	14	9	+5	12
2	Deportivo Universitaro	6	4	0	2	13	8	+5	12
3	Xeneize de Quilcapuncu	6	2	1	3	5	12	−7	7
4	Magisterio de Ilave	6	1	1	4	6	9	−3	4

Rules for classification: 1) Points; 2) Goal difference; 3) Goals for; 4) Fair play points; 5) Drawing of lots.

==== Group C ====
Pos	Team	Pld	W	D	L	GF	GA	GD	Pts
1	Los Pumas (Azángaro)	6	4	1	1	14	9	+5	13
2	Real Unión (Cuyocuyo)	6	3	1	2	10	12	−2	10
3	River Play (Coyorana)	6	3	0	3	8	8	0	9
4	Unión Dínamo (Taraco)	6	2	0	4	6	9	−3	6

Rules for classification: 1) Points; 2) Goal difference; 3) Goals for; 4) Fair play points; 5) Drawing of lots.

==== Group D ====
Pos	Team	Pld	W	D	L	GF	GA	GD	Pts
1	Deportivo Municipal (Nuñoa)	6	3	3	0	9	5	+4	12
2	Unión Platense	6	2	3	1	12	8	+4	9
3	Sportivo Abelito	6	1	2	3	6	12	−6	5
4	Strong Boys	6	1	2	3	9	11	−2	5

Rules for classification: 1) Points; 2) Goal difference; 3) Goals for; 4) Fair play points; 5) Drawing of lots.

==== Group E ====
Pos	Team	Pld	W	D	L	GF	GA	GD	Pts
1	Sport Aurora	6	3	2	1	16	5	+11	11
2	Minera Los Andes	6	3	1	2	8	5	+3	10
3	Defensor Barrios Altos	6	2	2	2	5	5	0	8
4	Deportivo Municipal (Coasa)	6	1	1	4	3	17	−14	4

Rules for classification: 1) Points; 2) Goal difference; 3) Goals for; 4) Fair play points; 5) Drawing of lots.

=== Second stage ===
==== Group A ====
Pos	Team	Pld	W	D	L	GF	GA	GD	Pts
1	UDE Los Próceres	6	6	0	0	16	1	+15	18
2	Deportivo Universitaro	6	1	3	2	7	5	+2	6
3	Deportivo Municipal (Nuñoa)	6	1	3	2	8	7	+1	6
4	Real Unión (Cuyocuyo)	6	0	2	4	4	22	−18	2

Rules for classification: 1) Points; 2) Goal difference; 3) Goals for; 4) Fair play points; 5) Drawing of lots.

==== Tiebreaker ====
Team 1	Score	Team 2
Deportivo Universitaro	3–0	Deportivo Municipal (Nuñoa)

==== Group B ====
Pos	Team	Pld	W	D	L	GF	GA	GD	Pts
1	Unión Ángeles de Vizcachani	6	4	0	2	15	5	+10	12
2	Sport Aurora	6	2	3	1	8	5	+3	9
3	River Play (Coyorana)	6	2	2	2	7	11	−4	8
4	Unión Platense	6	0	3	3	6	15	−9	3

Rules for classification: 1) Points; 2) Goal difference; 3) Goals for; 4) Fair play points; 5) Drawing of lots.

==== Group C ====
===== Play-Off (Group C) =====
Team 1	Score	Team 2
Melgarcito Junior	2–1	Defensor Barrios Altos

Pos	Team	Pld	W	D	L	GF	GA	GD	Pts
1	Diablos Rojos	6	5	0	1	16	4	+12	15
2	Minera Los Andes	6	5	0	1	13	4	+9	15
3	Melgarcito Junior	6	0	2	4	4	13	−9	2
4	Los Pumas (Azángaro)	6	0	2	4	6	18	−12	2

Rules for classification: 1) Points; 2) Goal difference; 3) Goals for; 4) Fair play points; 5) Drawing of lots.

==== Tiebreaker ====
Team 1	Score	Team 2
Diablos Rojos	2–3	Minera Los Andes

=== Third Stage ===
Team 1	Agg.	Team 2	1st leg	2nd leg
Diablos Rojos	3–1	UDE Los Próceres	2–0	1–1
Sport Aurora	1–3	Unión Ángeles de Vizcachani	1–1	0–2
Minera Los Andes	0–0 (3–5p)	Deportivo Universitario	0–0	0–0

=== Triangular Final ===
Pos	Team	Pld	W	D	L	GF	GA	GD	Pts	Qualification or relegation
1	Unión Ángeles de Vizcachani	2	1	1	0	1	0	+1	4	Advance to 2023 Copa Perú
2	Diablos Rojos	2	1	0	1	2	2	0	3	Advance to 2023 Copa Perú
3	Deportivo Universitario	2	0	1	1	1	2	−1	1	

Rules for classification: 1) Points; 2) Goal difference; 3) Goals for; 4) Fair play points; 5) Drawing of lots.

==== Results ====
Team 1	Score	Team 2
Deportivo Universitario	0–0	Unión Ángeles de Vizcachani
Diablos Rojos	2–1	Deportivo Universitario
Unión Ángeles de Vizcachani	1–0	Diablos Rojos

== Liga Departamental de San Martín ==
=== First stage ===
==== Zona Norte ====
Team 1	Agg.	Team 2	1st leg	2nd leg
Atlético Awajun	2–3	Kechwas Lamistas	1–2	1–1
Defensor Huáscar	1–2	AD Tahuishco	1–1	0–1
San Lorenzo de Huastilla	1–1 (4–2p)	Unión Alto Mayo	1–0	0–1

==== Zona Centro ====
Team 1	Agg.	Team 2	1st leg	2nd leg
Alianza Tres Unidos	3–6	Unión Tarapoto	2–2	1–4
Colegio Juan Guerra	4–1	Kawana Sisa	2–0	2–1
Defensor Punchana	9–1	Unión Picota	6–0	3–1

==== Zona Sur ====
Team 1	Agg.	Team 2	1st leg	2nd leg
Oriental Sporting	4–4 (2–4p)	Academia CIMAC	4–2	0–2
Unión Cuzco	7–2	Cahuide	2–0	5–2
Deportivo Comercio	3–1	Cañabrava	1–1	2–0

=== Second stage ===
==== Zona Norte ====
Team 1	Agg.	Team 2	1st leg	2nd leg
AD Tahuishco	4–3	Kechwas Lamistas	2–1	2–2
Unión Alto Mayo	5–2	San Lorenzo de Huastilla	5–1	0–1

==== Zona Centro ====
Team 1	Agg.	Team 2	1st leg	2nd leg
Defensor Punchana	2–2 (4–5p)	Colegio Juan Guerra	1–2	1–0
Unión Tarapoto	6–0	Alianza Tres Unidos	2–0	4–0

==== Zona Sur ====
Team 1	Agg.	Team 2	1st leg	2nd leg
Oriental Sporting	2–0	Deportivo Comercio	1–0	1–0
Unión Cuzco	3–1	Academia CIMAC	2–0	1–1

=== Third stage ===
Team 1	Agg.	Team 2	1st leg	2nd leg
Unión Alto Mayo	2–3	Unión Tarapoto	2–0	0–3
Oriental Sporting	2–2 (4–2p)	Colegio Juan Guerra	0–1	2–1
AD Tahuishco	4–2	Unión Cuzco	2–1	2–1

=== Semifinals ===
Team 1	Agg.	Team 2	1st leg	2nd leg
Colegio Juan Guerra	3–4	Unión Tarapoto	1–1	2–3
Oriental Sporting	1–1 (6–7p)	AD Tahuishco	1–0	0–1

=== Finals ===
Team 1	Agg.	Team 2	1st leg	2nd leg
AD Tahuishco	4–0	Unión Tarapoto	3–0	1–0

== Liga Departamental de Tacna ==
=== First stage ===
Team 1	Agg.	Team 2	1st leg	2nd leg
Defensor Ticaco	2–8	Bentín Tacna Heroica	0–3	2–5
Defensor Tacna	11–1	Águilas Melgar	4–0	7–1
Virgen de las Nieves	2–3	Defensor Real Caleta	1–1	1–2
Defensor San Isidro	4–1	Juventud Alba Roja	4–0	0–1

=== Second stage ===
Team 1	Agg.	Team 2	1st leg	2nd leg
Virgen de las Nieves	1–3	Defensor Tacna	1–1	0–2
Juventud Alba Roja	0–12	Bentín Tacna Heroica	0–1	0–11
Defensor San Isidro	3–4	Defensor Real Caleta	1–2	2–2

=== Liguilla ===
Pos	Team	Pld	W	D	L	GF	GA	GD	Pts	Qualification or relegation
1	Bentín Tacna Heroica	3	3	0	0	8	1	+7	9	Advance to 2023 Copa Perú
2	Defensor Tacna	3	2	0	1	7	2	+5	6	Advance to 2023 Copa Perú
3	Defensor Real Caleta	3	1	0	2	4	6	−2	3	
4	Defensor San Isidro	3	0	0	3	1	11	−10	0	

Rules for classification: 1) Points; 2) Goal difference; 3) Goals for; 4) Fair play points; 5) Drawing of lots.

== Liga Departamental de Tumbes ==
=== Standings ===
Pos	Team	Pld	W	D	L	GF	GA	GD	Pts	Qualification or relegation
1	Renovación Pacífico	5	3	1	1	10	7	+3	10	Advance to 2023 Copa Perú
2	Boca Juniors (La Choza)	5	3	0	2	10	9	+1	9	Advance to 2023 Copa Perú
3	Sport El Tablazo	5	2	1	2	9	6	+3	7	
4	Halcones del Norte	5	2	1	2	4	6	−2	7	
5	24 de Julio	5	2	0	3	7	9	−2	6	
6	Academia Quevedo	5	1	1	3	5	8	−3	4	

Rules for classification: 1) Points; 2) Goal difference; 3) Goals for; 4) Fair play points; 5) Drawing of lots.

== Liga Departamental de Ucayali ==
=== First stage ===
Team 1	Agg.	Team 2	1st leg	2nd leg
Cocaleros	2–3	Nuevo Pucallpa	1–0	1–3
Miguel Grau (Atalaya)	2–8	Escuela Municipal de Tournavista	2–0	0–8
Huracán Inter	3–0	Pedro Ruiz Gallo	0–0	3–0
Inter FC	5–1	Deportivo Shambillo	2–0	3–1

=== Second stage ===
Team 1	Agg.	Team 2	1st leg	2nd leg
Escuela Municipal de Tournavista	6–5	Atlético Raymondi	3–3	3–2
Inter FC	3–3 (3–4 p)	Huracán Inter	1–2	2–1

=== Liguilla ===
Pos	Team	Pld	W	D	L	GF	GA	GD	Pts	Qualification or relegation
1	Inter FC	3	1	2	0	5	3	+2	5	Advance to 2023 Copa Perú
2	Escuela Municipal de Tournavista	3	1	2	0	6	4	+2	5	Advance to 2023 Copa Perú
3	Nuevo Pucallpa	3	1	1	1	3	3	0	4	
4	Huracán Inter	3	0	1	2	2	6	−4	1	

Rules for classification: 1) Points; 2) Goal difference; 3) Goals for; 4) Fair play points; 5) Drawing of lots.

==== Tiebreaker ====
Team 1	Score	Team 2
Inter FC	3–2	Escuela Municipal de Tournavista

== See also ==
- 2023 Liga 1
- 2023 Liga 2
- 2023 Copa Perú
- 2023 Liga Femenina
- 2023 Torneo de Promoción y Reserva
