= 2025 Liga 2 (Peru) =

Liga 2
- Season: 2025
- Dates: 4 April – 16 November 2025
- Champions: Cajamarca (1st title)
- Runner up: Deportivo Moquegua
- Promoted: Cajamarca; Deportivo Moquegua
- Relegated: Deportivo Coopsol
- Matches: 188
- Goals: 466 (2.48 per match)
- Top goalscorer: Victor Perlaza; Maximiliano Zárate (13 goals each)
- Biggest home win: Comerciantes 6–0 San Marcos (21 September)
- Biggest away win: San Marcos 1–4 Unión Comercio (16 August)
- Highest scoring: Deportivo Moquegua 6–2 Carlos A. Mannucci (14 September)

The 2025 Liga 2 (known as the Liga 2 Caja Cusco 2025 for sponsorship reasons) was the 73rd edition of the second tier of Federación Peruana de Futbol. This year's edition started on 4 April 2025 and ended on 16 November 2025.

== Teams ==
Initially, 18 teams were to take part in this season: the top 16 teams from the 2024 season plus the 2024 Copa Perú finalists Bentín Tacna Heroica and FC Cajamarca who will both play in the Liga 2 for the first time. However, in October 2024, Deportivo Municipal suffered revocation of its Liga 2 license and was relegated to 2025 Liga 3, decreasing the number of teams from 18 to 17. Additionally, Ayacucho FC and Binacional's reincorporation into the Liga 1 from winning a judicial battle against the Peruvian Football Federation decreased the number of teams to 15.

2024 Liga 2 champions Alianza Universidad and runners-up Juan Pablo II College were promoted to the 2025 Liga 1. Juan Pablo II College were promoted for the first time in their history while Alianza Universidad were promoted for the first time since 2020. The promoted teams were replaced by Carlos A. Mannucci, Universidad César Vallejo, Unión Comercio who were relegated from the 2024 Liga 1. Deportivo Municipal, Carlos Stein, Juan Aurich, and Unión Huaral were relegated or disqualified to the Liga 3 in the 2024 season.

On December 19, 2024, UCV Moquegua changed its name to Club Deportivo Moquegua in order to give the team a new identity.

The following teams have changed division since the 2024 season:

=== Team changes ===
Promoted from 2024 Copa Perú	Relegated from 2024 Liga 1	Promoted to 2025 Liga 1	Relegated to 2025 Liga 3
▲ Bentín Tacna Heroica (1st) ▲ Cajamarca (2nd)	▼ Carlos A. Mannucci (16th) ▼ Universidad César Vallejo (17th) ▼ Unión Comercio (18th)	▲ Alianza Universidad (1st) ▲ Juan Pablo II College (2nd) ▲ Ayacucho (Reinstated) ▲ Binacional (Reinstated)	▼ Deportivo Municipal (12th, Retired) ▼ Carlos Stein (16th) ▼ Juan Aurich (Retired) ▼ Unión Huaral (Retired)

=== Stadia and locations ===
Locations of the 2025 Liga 2 teams

Team	City	Stadium	Capacity
Academia Cantolao	Callao	Miguel Grau	17,000
ADA	Jaén	Víctor Montoya Segura	9,000
Bentín Tacna Heroica	Tacna	Jorge Basadre	19,850
Cajamarca	Cajamarca	Cristo El Señor	20,000
Carlos A. Mannucci	Trujillo	Mansiche	25,036
Comerciantes	Iquitos	Max Augustín	24,576
Deportivo Coopsol	Chancay	Rómulo Shaw Cisneros	3,000
Deportivo Llacuabamba	Huamachuco	Municipal de Huamachuco	5,000
Deportivo Moquegua	Moquegua	25 de Noviembre	21,073
Pirata	Chongoyape	Municipal de la Juventud	2,500
San Marcos	Huaraz	Rosas Pampa	18,000
Santos	Nazca	Municipal de Nasca	10,000
Unión Comercio	Tarapoto	Carlos Vidaurre García	7,000
Universidad César Vallejo	Trujillo	César Acuña Peralta	2,000
Universidad San Martín	Lima	Villa Deportiva USMP	1,249

== Regional Stage ==
=== Zona Norte ===
Pos	Team	Pld	W	D	L	GF	GA	GD	Pts	Qualification	CAJ	SMA	UCV	ADA	CAM	LLA	PIR
1	Cajamarca	12	8	1	3	19	13	+6	25	Advance to Group Stage		1–0	1–0	4–1	3–2	2–0	3–0
2	San Marcos	12	5	3	4	9	5	+4	18	Advance to Group Stage	2–0		1–0	0–1	0–1	3–0	1–0
3	Universidad César Vallejo	12	5	2	5	14	10	+4	17	Advance to Group Stage	2–3	0–0		1–3	2–0	4–1	2–0
4	ADA	12	4	4	4	12	13	−1	16	Advance to Group Stage	1–0	0–0	0–1		1–1	1–1	1–2
5	Carlos A. Mannucci	12	5	2	5	17	14	+3	15 (Note: Carlos A. Mannucci was docked a total of 2 points for outstanding debts with the SAFAP.)	Advance to Group Stage	5–1	1–1	0–2	0–1		4–1	1–0
6	Deportivo Llacuabamba	12	4	3	5	12	17	−5	15	Qualification for Grupo Descenso	0–0	1–0	0–0	2–1	2–1		4–0
7	Pirata	12	3	1	8	5	16	−11	10	Qualification for Grupo Descenso	0–1	0–1	1–0	1–1	0–1	1–0	

Legend: Blue = home team win; Yellow = draw; Red = away team win.

=== Zona Sur ===
Pos	Team	Pld	W	D	L	GF	GA	GD	Pts	Qualification	CFC	MOQ	UCO	BEN	SAN	USM	COO	CAN
1	Comerciantes	14	8	4	2	25	12	+13	28	Advance to Group Stage		1–1	2–1	2–0	3–2	2–1	4–0	2–0
2	Deportivo Moquegua	14	7	4	3	20	13	+7	25	Advance to Group Stage	1–2		1–0	2–1	0–1	3–1	1–2	3–0
3	Unión Comercio	14	7	2	5	24	19	+5	23	Advance to Group Stage	2–1	1–1		3–1	3–1	1–2	3–1	1–0
4	Bentín Tacna Heroica	14	7	2	5	25	21	+4	23	Advance to Group Stage	2–1	2–2	3–2		4–0	2–0	2–0	2–1
5	Santos	14	6	3	5	21	21	0	21	Advance to Group Stage	1–1	1–1	2–1	4–1		2–3	1–1	2–0
6	Universidad San Martín	14	6	2	6	17	20	−3	20	Qualification for Grupo Descenso	0–3	1–2	1–1	2–1	2–0		3–1	1–0
7	Deportivo Coopsol	14	3	3	8	13	25	−12	12	Qualification for Grupo Descenso	0–0	0–1	3–4	0–2	0–2	2–0		1–1
8	Academia Cantolao	14	0	4	10	7	21	−14	4	Qualification for Grupo Descenso	1–1	0–1	0–1	2–2	1–2	0–0	1–2	

Legend: Blue = home team win; Yellow = draw; Red = away team win.

== Group Stage ==
In the Group Stage, teams ranked 1st and 2nd in the Regional stage started with 2 and 1 extra points respectively. Points earned during the Regional Stage do not carry over during the Group Stage.

=== Group A ===
Pos	Team	Pld	W	D	L	GF	GA	GD	Pts	Qualification	CAJ	MOQ	UCV	BEN	CAM
1	Cajamarca	8	3	3	2	10	8	+2	14 (Note: Awarded 2 points for finishing first in Zone Norte)	Advance to semi-finals		2–1	2–0	1–2	2–2
2	Deportivo Moquegua	8	3	3	2	14	11	+3	13 (Note: Awarded 1 point for finishing second in Zone Sur)	Advance to quarter-finals	2–0		1–0	0–0	6–2
3	Universidad César Vallejo	8	3	2	3	10	10	0	11	Advance to quarter-finals	0–0	1–1		4–2	3–2
4	Bentín Tacna Heroica	8	2	4	2	11	12	−1	10		0–0	2–2	1–2		1–0
5	Carlos A. Mannucci	8	2	2	4	15	19	−4	8		1–3	4–1	1–0	3–3	

Updated to match(es) played on 21 September 2025. Source:
Legend: Blue = home team win; Yellow = draw; Red = away team win.

=== Group B ===
Pos	Team	Pld	W	D	L	GF	GA	GD	Pts	Qualification	UCO	CFC	ADA	SAN	SMA
1	Unión Comercio	8	7	0	1	18	4	+14	21	Advance to semi-finals		2–0	2–0	2–1	5–0
2	Comerciantes	8	2	3	3	12	7	+5	11 (Note: Awarded 2 points for finishing first in Zone Sur)	Advance to quarter-finals	0–1		1–1	3–0	6–0
3	ADA	8	2	4	2	9	9	0	10	Advance to quarter-finals	2–0	2–2		1–2	0–0
4	Santos	8	3	1	4	10	11	−1	10		0–2	0–0	1–2		3–0
5	San Marcos	8	1	2	5	4	22	−18	6 (Note: Awarded 1 point for finishing second in Zone Norte)		1–4	1–0	1–1	1–3	

Updated to match(es) played on 21 September 2025. Source:
Legend: Blue = home team win; Yellow = draw; Red = away team win.

== Play-offs ==
Quarter-finals
2B	Comerciantes	0 (2)
3A	Universidad César Vallejo	0 (4)
2A	Deportivo Moquegua	2
3B	ADA	1

Semi-finals
3A	Universidad César Vallejo	0	0	0
1A	Cajamarca	0	3	3
2A	Deportivo Moquegua	2	1	3
1B	Unión Comercio	1	1	2

Final & Repechaje
Repechaje
3A	Universidad César Vallejo	2	2	4
1B	Unión Comercio	0	2	2
Final
1A	Cajamarca	1	2	3
2A	Deportivo Moquegua	2	0	2

2nd place match
3A	Universidad César Vallejo	0	2	2
2A	Deportivo Moquegua	1	3	4

=== Quarter-finals ===
5 October 2025
13:00

Deportivo Moquegua	2–1	ADA
Derlis Chávez 64' 67'		Facundo Rodríguez 9'

25 de Noviembre, Moquegua
Referee: Bruno Pérez
5 October 2025
15:15

Comerciantes	0–0	Universidad César Vallejo
Penalties
Pablo Lemos (penalty scored); Rider Guevara (penalty missed); Jefferson Valdeblanquez (penalty missed); Joffre Vásquez (penalty scored)	2–4	(penalty scored) Alexander Succar; (penalty scored) Danilo Carando; (penalty scored) Juan Morales; (penalty scored) Fernando Da Rosa

Max Augustín, Iquitos
Referee: Joel Alarcón

=== Semi-finals ===
==== First leg ====
12 October 2025
11:00

Deportivo Moquegua	2–1	Unión Comercio
Jeferson Collazos 36'; Nicolas Chavez 78'		Víctor Perlaza 42'

25 de Noviembre, Moquegua
Referee: Daniel Ureta
12 October 2025
13:15

Universidad César Vallejo	0–0	Cajamarca

César Acuña Peralta, Trujillo
Referee: Jordi Espinoza

==== Second leg ====
19 October 2025
13:00

Cajamarca	3–0	Universidad César Vallejo
Abel Casquete 36' 78'; Diego Cuadros 41'

Cristo el Señor, Cajamarca
Referee: Bruno Pérez
19 October 2025
15:15

Unión Comercio	1–1	Deportivo Moquegua
Victor Perlazza 62'		José Francisco López 87'

Carlos Vidaurre García, Tarapoto
Referee: Augusto Menéndez

=== Repechaje ===
26 October 2025
15:15

Universidad César Vallejo	2–0	Unión Comercio

César Acuña Peralta, Trujillo
Referee: Edwin Ordoñez
2 November 2025
15:15

Unión Comercio	2–2	Universidad César Vallejo

Carlos Vidaurre García, Tarapoto

=== Final ===
26 October 2025
13:00

Deportivo Moquegua	2–1	Cajamarca
Jeferson Collazos 20'; José Granda 90+3'		Carlos Meza 36'

25 de Noviembre, Moquegua
Referee: Michael Espinoza
2 November 2025
15:15

Cajamarca	2–0	Deportivo Moquegua
Denylson Chávez 17'; Hairo Timana 36'

Cristo el Señor, Cajamarca
Referee: Daniel Ureta

=== 2nd Place Match ===
9 November 2025
15:15

Universidad César Vallejo	0–1	Deportivo Moquegua
		Diego M. Sánchez 75'

César Acuña Peralta, Trujillo
Referee: Augusto Menendez
16 November 2025
13:00

Deportivo Moquegua	3–2	Universidad César Vallejo
Jeferson Collazos 21'; Eros Montenegro 26'; José López Quintanilla 66'		Joel Quispe 36'; Miguel Ángel Cornejo 45+1'

25 de Noviembre, Moquegua

== Grupo Descenso ==
=== Standings ===
Pos	Team	Pld	W	D	L	GF	GA	GD	Pts		PIR	CAN	LLA	USM	COO
1	Pirata	8	4	1	3	12	10	+2	13			3–1	4–1	2–1	1–0
2	Academia Cantolao	8	4	1	3	9	9	0	13		2–1		1–0	1–0	0–0
3	Deportivo Llacuabamba	8	4	0	4	14	13	+1	12		2–1	4–3		4–1	2–0
4	Universidad San Martín	8	3	1	4	11	11	0	10		3–0	0–1	2–1		0–0
5	Deportivo Coopsol (R)	8	2	3	3	4	7	−3	9	Relegation to 2026 Liga 3	0–0	1–0	1–0	2–4	

Updated to match(es) played on 20 September 2025. Source:
Legend: Blue = home team win; Yellow = draw; Red = away team win.
(R) Relegated

== Top scorers ==
As of 18 November 2025

Source : Instagram

Rank	Player	Club	Goals
1	(Colombia) Victor Perlaza	Unión Comercio	13
1	(Argentina) Maximiliano Zárate	Deportivo Llacuabamba	13
3	(Colombia) Jeferson Collazos	Deportivo Moquegua	11
4	(Peru) Jhojan Dominguez	Comerciantes	10
5	(Paraguay) Nicolás Chávez	Deportivo Moquegua	9

== See also ==
- 2025 Liga 1
- 2025 Liga 3
- 2025 Copa Perú
- 2025 Ligas Departamentales del Perú
- 2025 Liga Femenina
- 2025 Torneo Juvenil Sub-18
