= Walter Vásquez =

Peruvian footballer (born 1998)

Personal information
- Full name: Walter Junior Vásquez Ríos
- Date of birth: 28 August 1998 (age 28)
- Place of birth: Loreto, Peru
- Height: 1.80 m (5 ft 11 in)
- Position: Winger

Youth career
- Sporting Cristal

Senior career*
Years	Team	Apps	(Gls)
–2017	Yurimaguas		
2018–2020	Sport Boys	14	(1)
2021	Deportivo Coopsol	5	(0)
2022	Chavelines	0	(0)
2022	San Cristóbal		
2023	Bentín Tacna Heroica		
2024	UCV Moquegua	8	(1)
2025	Defensor Arguedas	12	(0)
- * Club domestic league appearances and goals as of 10:41, 22 September 2024 (UTC)

Walter Junior Vásquez Ríos (born 28 August 1998) is a Peruvian footballer who plays as a winger.

== Early years ==
Vasquez started playing football at Sporting Cristal but left the club shortly after due to family reasons. He started his career again, joining Yurimaguas and in 2016, before he was contacted by Sport Boys, after being spotted in Copa Perú.

== Club career ==
=== Sport Boys ===
In 2018, 18-year old Vasquez joined Sport Boys, after the club's reserve team coach, Luis Hernández, invited him to join the team. Vasquez spent his first year at the club on the reserve team. After Sport Boys was promoted to the Peruvian Primera División in 2018, first team coach, Mario Viera, saw Vasquez scoring two goals in a game for Sport Boys' reserves, and offered him a professional contract which also secured him a promotion to the first team squad. However, he still played most of the year for the reserve team except for at the end of the year, where he got his official debut for Sport Boys on 7 November 2018 against Deportivo Binacional. Vasquez played from the first minute and was noticed for an assist to Carlos Neyra. He participated in two further games in the 2018 season.

In the 2019 season, he didn't participate in a single game for the first team but was a regular player for the reserve team.

=== Later career ===
On 30 March 2021, Peruvian Segunda División club Deportivo Coopsol confirmed, that Vásquez had joined the club. In April 2022, Vásquez moved to fellow league club, Sport Chavelines Juniors.

In 2022, Vásquez played for Credicoop San Cristóbal. In 2023, he moved to Bentín Tacna Heroica. In January 2024, he joined Peruvian Segunda División side UCV Moquegua.
