= 2023 Copa Perú =

Copa Perú
- Season: 2023
- Champions: ADA (1st title)
- Promoted: ADA; Juan Pablo II College; San Marcos; UCV Moquegua

The 2023 Peru Cup season (Spanish: Copa Perú 2023), the largest amateur tournament of Peruvian football. The District Stage (Spanish: Ligas Distritales) started in 12 February, and the National Stage (Spanish: Etapa Nacional) started in November. The winner, runner-up and the semifinalists of the National Stage were promoted to the Liga 2.

On 23 August 2022, it was announced that starting from 2023, the Copa Perú would only give promotion to Liga 2 due to the reforms of Peruvian football by the FPF, meaning that the 2022 Copa Perú edition was the last that awarded its winning team promotion to the Peruvian top flight.

== Team changes ==
Promoted to 2023 Liga 2	Relegated from 2022 Liga 2	Promoted to 2023 Liga 1
▲ Comerciantes (2nd)	▼ Sport Chavelines (13th)	▲ Deportivo Garcilaso (1st)

== Departmental stage ==
Departmental Stage: 2023 Ligas Departamentales del Perú

The following list shows the teams that qualified for the National Stage.

Department	Team	Location
Amazonas	Unión Santo Domingo	Chachapoyas
Amazonas	Deportivo Municipal (Jazán)	Jazán
Ancash	San Marcos	Huari
Ancash	Star Áncash	Huaraz
Apurímac	Miguel Grau	Abancay
Apurímac	FC Municipal Challhuahuacho	Challhuahuacho
Arequipa	Nacional	Mollendo
Arequipa	Aurora	Arequipa
Ayacucho	Sport Cáceres	Huamanga
Ayacucho	VRAEM FC	Pichari
Cajamarca	ADA	Jaén
Cajamarca	Cajamarca	Cajamarca
Callao	Calidad Porteña	Callao
Callao	Juventud Palmeiras	Mi Perú
Cusco	AJI	Calca
Cusco	Defensor Cubillas	Espinar
Huancavelica	Deportivo Vianney	Huancavelica
Huancavelica	Diablos Rojos	Huancavelica
Huánuco	Independiente de Huachog	Santa María del Valle
Huánuco	Castle FC	Ambo
Ica	Alianza Pisco	Pisco
Ica	Lolo Fernández	Puquio
Junín	CESA	Huancayo
Junín	Atlético Chanchamayo	Chanchamayo
La Libertad	Defensor Porvenir	Trujillo
La Libertad	Alfonso Ugarte de Chiclín	Trujillo

Department	Team	Location
Lambayeque	Juan Pablo II College	Chongoyape
Lambayeque	Juventud La Joya	Lambayeque
Lima	Deportivo Huracán	Canta
Lima	Maristas	Huacho
Loreto	Atlético Hospital	Contamana
Loreto	PCR Ex 160	Alto Amazonas
Madre de Dios	La Masía Nace	Huepetuhe
Madre de Dios	Real Atlético Nueva	Huepetuhe
Moquegua	Hijos del Altiplano y del Pacífico	Ilo
Moquegua	UCV Moquegua	Mariscal Nieto
Pasco	Ecosem Pasco	Pasco
Pasco	Sociedad Tiro 28	Pasco
Piura	Olimpia	La Unión
Piura	Academia Cristo Rey	La Brea
Puno	Unión Ángeles de Vizcachani	Santa Rosa
Puno	Diablos Rojos	Juliaca
San Martín	AD Tahuishco	Moyobamba
San Martín	Unión Tarapoto	Tarapoto
Tacna	Bentín Tacna Heroica	Tacna
Tacna	Defensor Tacna	Tacna
Tumbes	Renovación Pacífico	Tumbes
Tumbes	Boca Juniors (La Choza)	Casitas
Ucayali	Inter FC	Manantay
Ucayali	Escuela Municipal de Tournavista	Puerto Inca

== National Stage ==
In 2023 the National Stage has grown to 50 teams, and the new National Stage, designed by matchVision, is played under Regional using the POT System, with all the Regions of Peru represented. The National Stage starts in the second week of September.

This phase features the 50 teams that qualified from the Departmental Stage. Each team plays 3 games at home and 3 games away, for a total of 6 games against 3 different geographical rivals. The departmental stage winners only play against departmental runners-up, and vice versa. All the teams are positioned in one general table. After 6 matches, the team in places 1 to 32 are qualified directly to the Round of 32. The teams in places 33 to 50 are eliminated.

The winner, runner-up and the semifinalists of the National Stage were promoted to the Liga 2.

=== Tie-breaking criteria ===
The ranking of teams in the Unique Table is based on the following criteria:
1. Number of Points
3. Goal difference
4. Number of goals scored
5. Better performance in away matches based on the following criteria:
1. Number of Away Points
3. Goal Difference in away games
4. Number of goals scored in away games
6. Number of First-Half points: considering the half-time results as the final results
7. Drawing of lots

=== League table ===
Pos	Team	Pld	W	D	L	GF	GA	GD	Pts	Qualification
1	Miguel Grau	6	5	0	1	13	7	+6	15	Round of 32
2	Sport Cáceres	6	5	0	1	13	7	+6	15	Round of 32
3	Unión Tarapoto	6	4	2	0	20	6	+14	14	Round of 32
4	Defensor Porvenir	6	4	2	0	13	4	+9	14	Round of 32
5	San Marcos	6	4	1	1	16	7	+9	13	Round of 32
6	AJI	6	4	1	1	7	4	+3	13	Round of 32
7	ADA	6	4	1	1	8	3	+5	13	Round of 32
8	Nacional	6	4	0	2	10	7	+3	12	Round of 32
9	Ecosem Pasco	6	3	3	0	11	3	+8	12	Round of 32
10	Deportivo Vianney	6	4	0	2	13	6	+7	12	Round of 32
11	Diablos Rojos (Juliaca)	6	4	0	2	12	4	+8	12	Round of 32
12	Unión Santo Domingo	6	4	0	2	11	10	+1	12	Round of 32
13	Diablos Rojos (Huancavelica)	6	3	2	1	8	6	+2	11	Round of 32
14	Deportivo Huracán	6	3	2	1	14	8	+6	11	Round of 32
15	Aurora	6	3	2	1	12	6	+6	11	Round of 32
16	AD Tahuishco	6	3	2	1	10	3	+7	11	Round of 32
17	UCV Moquegua	6	3	1	2	6	5	+1	10	Round of 32
18	Maristas	6	3	1	2	11	10	+1	10	Round of 32
19	Juan Pablo II College	6	2	4	0	8	6	+2	10	Round of 32
20	Alianza Pisco	6	3	1	2	7	4	+3	10	Round of 32
21	Renovación Pacífico	6	3	1	2	14	9	+5	10	Round of 32
22	Olimpia	6	3	1	2	12	9	+3	10	Round of 32
23	Defensor Cubillas	6	3	1	2	10	6	+4	10	Round of 32
24	VRAEM FC	6	3	0	3	8	8	0	9	Round of 32
25	Bentín Tacna Heroica	6	2	3	1	8	5	+3	9	Round of 32
26	Escuela Municipal de Tournavista	6	2	3	1	13	9	+4	9	Round of 32
27	Real Atlético Nueva	6	3	0	3	6	9	−3	9	Round of 32
28	Juventud La Joya	6	2	2	2	6	5	+1	8	Round of 32
29	Star Áncash	6	2	2	2	9	9	0	8	Round of 32
30	Independiente de Huachog	6	2	2	2	7	11	−4	8	Round of 32
31	Juventud Palmeiras	6	2	2	2	10	13	−3	8	Round of 32
32	Sociedad Tiro 28	6	2	2	2	6	2	+4	8	Round of 32
33	Castle FC	6	2	2	2	6	5	+1	8	Ligas Distritales
34	Academia Cristo Rey	6	2	1	3	9	13	−4	7	Ligas Distritales
35	PCR Ex 160	6	2	1	3	11	8	+3	7	Ligas Distritales
36	Unión Ángeles de Vizcachani	6	2	0	4	9	11	−2	6	Ligas Distritales
37	Hijos del Altiplano y del Pacífico	6	1	2	3	7	10	−3	5	Ligas Distritales
38	Atlético Hospital	6	1	2	3	9	20	−11	5	Ligas Distritales
39	Inter FC	6	1	2	3	7	14	−7	5	Ligas Distritales
40	Defensor Tacna	6	1	2	3	8	14	−6	5	Ligas Distritales
41	CESA	6	1	2	3	6	10	−4	5	Ligas Distritales
42	Calidad Porteña	6	1	1	4	9	15	−6	4	Ligas Distritales
43	Deportivo Municipal (Jazán)	6	1	0	5	6	12	−6	3	Ligas Distritales
44	Boca Juniors (La Choza)	6	0	3	3	6	13	−7	3	Ligas Distritales
45	Lolo Fernández	6	1	0	5	9	15	−6	3	Ligas Distritales
46	Cajamarca	6	0	2	4	3	11	−8	2	Ligas Distritales
47	Atlético Chanchamayo	6	0	2	4	4	19	−15	2	Ligas Distritales
48	FC Municipal Challhuahuacho	6	0	0	6	6	14	−8	0	Ligas Distritales
49	La Masía Nace	6	0	0	6	1	16	−15	0	Ligas Distritales
50	Alfonso Ugarte de Chiclín	6	0	0	6	4	21	−17	0	Ligas Distritales

Updated to match(es) played on 8 October 2023. Source:
Rules for classification: 1) points; 2) goal difference; 3) number of goals scored; 4) head-to-head record; 5) drawing of lots

=== Round 1 ===
Team 1	Score	Team 2
Renovación Pacífico	2–2	Juventud La Joya
Olimpia	1–1	Boca Juniors (La Choza)
Juan Pablo II College	2–1	Academia Cristo Rey
Unión Santo Domingo	3–2	Cajamarca
ADA	2–1	Deportivo Municipal (Jazán)
San Marcos	3–2	Maristas
Defensor Porvenir	1–0	Star Áncash
AD Tahuishco	5–1	Alfonso Ugarte de Chiclín
Atlético Hospital	1–1	Unión Tarapoto
Inter FC	1–0	PCR Ex 160
Calidad Porteña	2–1	Lolo Fernández
Deportivo Huracán	6–2	Juventud Palmeiras
Deportivo Vianney	2–0	Atlético Chanchamayo
Ecosem Pasco	1–0	Castle FC
CESA	0–3	Sociedad Tiro 28
Independiente de Huachog	3–2	Escuela Municipal de Tournavista
Nacional	4–1	Defensor Tacna
Bentín Tacna Heroica	1–0	UCV Moquegua
Unión Ángeles de Vizcachani	1–5	Aurora
Alianza Pisco	0–0	Diablos Rojos (Huancavelica)
Sport Cáceres	3–1	FC Municipal Challhuahuacho
Miguel Grau	3–2	VRAEM FC
AJI	1–0	Real Atlético Nueva
La Masía Nace	0–1	Defensor Cubillas
Hijos del Altiplano y del Pacífico	1–0	Diablos Rojos (Juliaca)

=== Round 2 ===
Team 1	Score	Team 2
Boca Juniors (La Choza)	1–1	Juan Pablo II College
Academia Cristo Rey	3–2	Renovación Pacífico
Deportivo Municipal (Jazán)	3–2	Olimpia
Juventud La Joya	1–0	ADA
Cajamarca	0–0	Defensor Porvenir
Alfonso Ugarte de Chiclín	0–1	San Marcos
Star Áncash	4–1	Independiente de Huachog
PCR Ex 160	0–1	AD Tahuishco
Escuela Municipal de Tournavista	4–2	Atlético Hospital
Unión Tarapoto	4–2	Unión Santo Domingo
Maristas	3–1	Calidad Porteña
Juventud Palmeiras	1–0	Alianza Pisco
Sociedad Tiro 28	0–0	Deportivo Huracán
Atlético Chanchamayo	2–2	Ecosem Pasco
VRAEM FC	2–1	Deportivo Vianney
Castle FC	2–0	Inter FC
UCV Moquegua	1–0	Nacional
Aurora	1–1	Bentín Tacna Heroica
Lolo Fernández	0–2	Sport Cáceres
Defensor Tacna	1–1	Hijos del Altiplano y del Pacífico
Diablos Rojos (Huancavelica)	3–2	CESA
Real Atlético Nueva	1–0	Unión Ángeles de Vizcachani
Diablos Rojos (Juliaca)	2–1	La Masía Nace
FC Municipal Challhuahuacho	0–1	AJI
Defensor Cubillas	1–2	Miguel Grau

=== Round 3 ===
Team 1	Score	Team 2
Renovación Pacífico	4–0	Boca Juniors (La Choza)
Olimpia	3–1	Academia Cristo Rey
Juan Pablo II College	1–0	Juventud La Joya
ADA	2–0	Cajamarca
Defensor Porvenir	4–2	Alfonso Ugarte de Chiclín
San Marcos	3–0	Star Áncash
Unión Santo Domingo	2–0	Deportivo Municipal (Jazán)
Atlético Hospital	5–2	PCR Ex 160
AD Tahuishco	0–0	Unión Tarapoto
Calidad Porteña	1–2	Juventud Palmeiras
Deportivo Huracán	3–1	Maristas
Ecosem Pasco	1–0	Sociedad Tiro 28
Independiente de Huachog	0–0	Castle FC
Nacional	2–1	Aurora
Alianza Pisco	2–0	Lolo Fernández
CESA	3–0	Atlético Chanchamayo
Bentín Tacna Heroica	1–1	Defensor Tacna
Sport Cáceres	2–0	VRAEM FC
Hijos del Altiplano y del Pacífico	1–1	UCV Moquegua
La Masía Nace	0–1	Real Atlético Nueva
Unión Ángeles de Vizcachani	1–0	Diablos Rojos (Juliaca)
Inter FC	1–1	Escuela Municipal de Tournavista
Miguel Grau	1–0	FC Municipal Challhuahuacho
AJI	1–1	Defensor Cubillas
Deportivo Vianney	0–1	Diablos Rojos (Huancavelica)

=== Round 4 ===
Team 1	Score	Team 2
Boca Juniors (La Choza)	1–3	Renovación Pacífico
Academia Cristo Rey	2–1	Olimpia
Juventud La Joya	0–0	Juan Pablo II College
Star Áncash	3–2	San Marcos
Cajamarca	0–0	ADA
Alfonso Ugarte de Chiclín	1–3	Defensor Porvenir
Deportivo Municipal (Jazán)	0–1	Unión Santo Domingo
PCR Ex 160	3–0	Atlético Hospital
Unión Tarapoto	2–1	AD Tahuishco
Juventud Palmeiras	2–2	Calidad Porteña
Maristas	2–1	Deportivo Huracán
Castle FC	0–1	Independiente de Huachog
Sociedad Tiro 28	0–0	Ecosem Pasco
Aurora	3–1	Nacional
Lolo Fernández	1–3	Alianza Pisco
Atlético Chanchamayo	1–1	CESA
Defensor Tacna	0–3	Bentín Tacna Heroica
Escuela Municipal de Tournavista	2–2	Inter FC
Defensor Cubillas	2–1	AJI
Diablos Rojos (Huancavelica)	2–3	Deportivo Vianney
FC Municipal Challhuahuacho	3–5	Miguel Grau
Diablos Rojos (Juliaca)	2–0	Unión Ángeles de Vizcachani
VRAEM FC	3–0	Sport Cáceres
Real Atlético Nueva	2–0	La Masía Nace
UCV Moquegua	1–0	Hijos del Altiplano y del Pacífico

=== Round 5 ===
Team 1	Score	Team 2
Renovación Pacífico	3–0	Academia Cristo Rey
Juan Pablo II College	2–2	Boca Juniors (La Choza)
Olimpia	3–1	Deportivo Municipal (Jazán)
ADA	2–0	Juventud La Joya
Defensor Porvenir	4–0	Cajamarca
San Marcos	5–0	Alfonso Ugarte de Chiclín
Independiente de Huachog	1–1	Star Áncash
AD Tahuishco	0–0	PCR Ex 160
Atlético Hospital	0–0	Escuela Municipal de Tournavista
Unión Santo Domingo	1–3	Unión Tarapoto
Calidad Porteña	0–1	Maristas
Alianza Pisco	1–0	Juventud Palmeiras
Deportivo Huracán	1–0	Sociedad Tiro 28
Ecosem Pasco	6–0	Atlético Chanchamayo
Deportivo Vianney	2–0	VRAEM FC
Inter FC	2–3	Castle FC
Nacional	1–0	UCV Moquegua
Bentín Tacna Heroica	0–0	Aurora
Hijos del Altiplano y del Pacífico	3–4	Defensor Tacna
Sport Cáceres	3–1	Lolo Fernández
CESA	0–0	Diablos Rojos (Huancavelica)
AJI	1–0	FC Municipal Challhuahuacho
La Masía Nace	0–5	Diablos Rojos (Juliaca)
Unión Ángeles de Vizcachani	6–1	Real Atlético Nueva
Miguel Grau	2–0	Defensor Cubillas

=== Round 6 ===
Team 1	Score	Team 2
Boca Juniors (La Choza)	1–2	Olimpia
Juventud La Joya	3–0	Renovación Pacífico
Academia Cristo Rey	2–2	Juan Pablo II College
Cajamarca	1–2	Unión Santo Domingo
Deportivo Municipal (Jazán)	1–2	ADA
Star Áncash	1–1	Defensor Porvenir
Alfonso Ugarte de Chiclín	0–3	AD Tahuishco
PCR Ex 160	6–1	Inter FC
Unión Tarapoto	10–1	Atlético Hospital
Maristas	2–2	San Marcos
Juventud Palmeiras	3–3	Deportivo Huracán
Lolo Fernández	6–3	Calidad Porteña
Escuela Municipal de Tournavista	4–1	Independiente de Huachog
Castle FC	1–1	Ecosem Pasco
Defensor Tacna	1–2	Nacional
Aurora	2–1	Unión Ángeles de Vizcachani
Diablos Rojos (Huancavelica)	2–1	Alianza Pisco
Atlético Chanchamayo	1–5	Deportivo Vianney
UCV Moquegua	3–2	Bentín Tacna Heroica
VRAEM FC	1–0	Miguel Grau
Sociedad Tiro 28	3–0	CESA
Real Atlético Nueva	1–2	AJI
Defensor Cubillas	5–0	La Masía Nace
Diablos Rojos (Juliaca)	3–1	Hijos del Altiplano y del Pacífico
FC Municipal Challhuahuacho	2–3	Sport Cáceres

== Final Rounds ==
Round of 32
Miguel Grau	0	6	6
Sociedad Tiro 28	3	0	3
AD Tahuishco	1	1	2
UCV Moquegua	1	2	3
Nacional	0	3	3 (3)
Bentín Tacna Heroica	2	1	3 (0)
Ecosem Pasco	0	5	5
VRAEM FC	2	1	3
Sport Cáceres	4	8	12
Juventud Palmeiras	1	0	1
Aurora	2	3	5
Maristas	1	2	3
ADA	2	1	3
Escuela Municipal de Tournavista	2	0	2
Deportivo Vianney	1	2	3
Olimpia	4	0	4
Unión Tarapoto	1	1	2 (8)
Independiente de Huachog	2	0	2 (7)
Deportivo Huracán	1	4	5
Juan Pablo II College	1	5	6
AJI	2	1	3
Real Atlético Nueva	0	0	0
Diablos Rojos (Juliaca)	6	0	6
Renovación Pacífico	0	3	3
Defensor Porvenir	2	7	9
Star Áncash	3	2	5
Diablos Rojos (Huancavelica)	0	3	3 (6)
Alianza Pisco	2	1	3 (5)
San Marcos	0	2	2
Juventud La Joya	0	0	0
Unión Santo Domingo	0	5	5
Defensor Cubillas	1	0	1

Round of 16
Miguel Grau	1	0	1
UCV Moquegua	2	3	5
Nacional	0	2	2
Ecosem Pasco	3	2	5
Sport Cáceres	0	3	3 (4)
Aurora	3	0	3 (3)
ADA	1	2	3
Olimpia	2	0	2
Unión Tarapoto	1	0	1
Juan Pablo II College	2	0	2
AJI	1	0	1
Diablos Rojos (Juliaca)	1	2	3
Defensor Porvenir	2	9	11
Diablos Rojos (Huancavelica)	6	1	7
San Marcos	0	2	2
Unión Santo Domingo	0	0	0

Quarterfinals
UCV Moquegua	1 (4)
Ecosem Pasco	1 (1)
Sport Cáceres	2 (2)
ADA	2 (3)
Juan Pablo II College	2
Diablos Rojos (Juliaca)	1
Defensor Porvenir	1
San Marcos	2

Semifinals
UCV Moquegua	0
ADA	1
Juan Pablo II College	2 (5)
San Marcos	2 (6)

Champion & Runner-Up
ADA	3
San Marcos	1

=== Round of 32 ===
Team 1	Agg.	Team 2	1st leg	2nd leg
Sociedad Tiro 28	3–6	Miguel Grau	3–0	0–6
UCV Moquegua	3–2	AD Tahuishco	1–1	2–1
Bentín Tacna Heroica	3–3 (0–3 p)	Nacional	2–0	1–3
VRAEM FC	3–5	Ecosem Pasco	2–0	1–5
Juventud Palmeiras	1–12	Sport Cáceres	1–4	0–8
Maristas	3–5	Aurora	1–2	2–3
Escuela Municipal de Tournavista	2–3	ADA	2–2	0–1
Olimpia	4–3	Deportivo Vianney	4–1	0–2
Independiente de Huachog	2–2 (7–8 p)	Unión Tarapoto	2–1	0–1
Juan Pablo II College	8–4	Deportivo Huracán	3–0	5–4
Real Atlético Nueva	0–3	AJI	0–2	0–1
Diablos Rojos (Juliaca)	6–3	Renovación Pacífico	6–0	0–3
Star Áncash	5–9	Defensor Porvenir	3–2	2–7
Alianza Pisco	3–3 (5–6 p)	Diablos Rojos (Huancavelica)	2–0	1–3
Juventud La Joya	0–2	San Marcos	0–0	0–2
Defensor Cubillas	1–5	Unión Santo Domingo	1–0	0–5

=== Round of 16 ===
Team 1	Agg.	Team 2	1st leg	2nd leg
UCV Moquegua	5–1	Miguel Grau	2–1	3–0
Ecosem Pasco	5–2	Nacional	3–0	2–2
Aurora	3–3 (3–4 p)	Sport Cáceres	3–0	0–3
Olimpia	2–3	ADA	2–1	0–2
Juan Pablo II College	2–1	Unión Tarapoto	2–1	0–0
Diablos Rojos (Juliaca)	3–2	AJI	1–1	2–0
Diablos Rojos (Huancavelica)	7–11	Defensor Porvenir	6–2	1–9
Unión Santo Domingo	1–3	San Marcos	0–0	1–3

=== Quarterfinals ===
18 November 2023	Ecosem Pasco	0–0 (1–4 p)	UCV Moquegua	Estadio Miguel Grau
11:00				Referee: Edwin Ordóñez
	Penalties
	César Medina (penalty missed); Víctor Espinoza (penalty missed); Darwin Meléndez (penalty scored)		Miguel Vinces (penalty scored); Manuel Olaya (penalty scored); Percy Paz (penalty scored); Óscar Cueva (penalty scored)

18 November 2023	Sport Cáceres	2–2 (2–3 p)	ADA	Estadio Miguel Grau
15:00	Alberto Vela 81' (pen.); Waldir Pelezuelos 90+2'		Andy Huamán 36'; Carlos León 61'	Referee: Michael Espinoza
	Penalties
	Waldir Pelezuelos (penalty scored); Diego Ruiz (penalty missed); Edward Pacheco (penalty scored); Yonel Manrique (penalty missed); Alberto Vela (penalty missed)		Fernando Prado (penalty missed); Brucelee Micha (penalty scored); Fernando Sánchez (penalty scored); Julio Landauri (penalty scored)

19 November 2023	Diablos Rojos (Juliaca)	1–2	Juan Pablo II College	Estadio Iván Elías Moreno
11:00	Jorge Blanco 90'		Eduardo Burga 2' 25'	Referee: Jesús Cartagena

19 November 2023	Defensor Porvenir	1–2	San Marcos	Estadio Iván Elías Moreno
15:00	Adrián Mujica 26' (pen.)		Jair Yglesias 45+5' (pen.); Félix Barahona 71'	Referee: Joel Alarcón

=== Semifinals ===
22 November 2023	ADA	1–0	UCV Moquegua	Estadio Iván Elías Moreno
11:00	Andy Huamán 63'			Referee: Micke Palomino

22 November 2023	San Marcos	2–2 (6–5 p)	Juan Pablo II College	Estadio Iván Elías Moreno
15:00	Fabio Rojas 53'; José Rojas 59'		Josue Canova 86'; Johnny Carbajal 90+3'	Referee: Daniel Ureta
	Penalties
	Jair Yglesias (penalty scored); Héctor Campos (penalty scored); Fabio Rojas (penalty scored); Felix Barahona (penalty missed); Michael Layza (penalty scored); Bremen Horna (penalty scored); Joaquín Carranza (penalty missed); Arley Velásquez (penalty scored)		Gustavo Aliaga (penalty scored); Johnny Carbajal (penalty scored); César Torres (penalty scored); Guillermo Echandía (penalty missed); Eduardo Burga (penalty scored); Josué Canova (penalty scored); Luis Chuna (penalty missed); Alan Núñez (penalty missed)

=== Final ===
26 November 2023	San Marcos	1–3	ADA	Estadio Iván Elías Moreno
14:00	Fabio Rojas 72'		Andy Huamán 32'; Carlos Enrique León 41'; Cristian Pérez 87'	Referee: Joel Alarcón

== Top goalscorers ==
Rank	Name	Club	Goals
1	(Peru) Christian Cuadros	Deportivo Huracán	14
2	(Peru) Juan Huangal	Defensor Porvenir	9
3	(Peru) Adrián Mujica	Defensor Porvenir	8

== See also ==
- 2023 Liga 1
- 2023 Liga 2
- 2023 Ligas Departamentales del Perú
