= Francisco Pizarro (Peruvian footballer) =

Peruvian football manager (born 1971)

Personal information
- Full name: Francisco Pizarro Fortunat
- Date of birth: 3 March 1971 (age 55)
- Place of birth: Lima, Peru
- Height: 1.83 m (6 ft 0 in)
- Position: Goalkeeper

Team information
- Current team: Unión Minas (manager)

Youth career
- Sporting Cristal

Senior career*
Years	Team	Apps	(Gls)
1990–1991	Sporting Cristal		
1992–1993	León de Huánuco		
1994–1997	Alianza Lima		
1998	Alianza Atlético	32	(0)
1999	Juan Aurich	36	(0)
2000	Deportivo Municipal	17	(0)
2001–2002	Melgar	62	(1)
2003	Unión Huaral	15	(0)
2004	Atlético Universidad		
2005	Sporting Cristal	2	(0)
2005	Atlético Universidad		
2006–2007	Alianza Lima		

Managerial career
- 2013: Alianza Lima (interim)
- 2015: Alianza Lima (interim)
- 2017: Deportivo Municipal (interim)
- 2017: Deportivo Municipal (interim)
- 2023: Ecosem Pasco
- 2023: UTC
- 2024: Santos de Nasca
- 2026–: Unión Minas
- * Club domestic league appearances and goals

Francsico Pizarro Fortunat (born 3 March 1971) is a Peruvian football manager and former player who played as a goalkeeper. He is the current manager of Unión Minas.

== Playing career ==
Born in Lima, Pizarro was a Sporting Cristal youth graduate. After making his first team debut in 1990, he played for two seasons with León de Huánuco before joining Alianza Lima in 1994. With the latter side, he featured in three Copa Libertadores editions, being a regular starter in the 1997 tournament.

Pizarro signed for Alianza Atlético in 1998, and subsequently represented top tier sides Juan Aurich, Deportivo Municipal, Melgar, Unión Huaral and Atlético Universidad before returning to his first club Sporting Cristal for the 2005 season. After featuring rarely, he returned to Atlético Universidad later in that year.

In 2006, aged 34, Pizarro returned to Alianza Lima, but his second spell was marked by the fight with Flavio Maestri during a training in November of that year. He retired in the following year, at the age of 36.

== Managerial career ==
After retiring, Pizarro became a goalkeeping coach of Alianza in 2012, and was involved in a fight with León de Huánuco goalkeeper Juan Flores in August of that year, during a match between both clubs. On 1 October 2013, he was named interim manager of Alianza, in the place of Wilmar Valencia.

Back to his previous role after the appointment of Guillermo Sanguinetti, Pizarro was again named interim on 29 October 2015, after Gustavo Roverano resigned. In the following month, he agreed to join Gustavo Costas' staff at Atlas, as a goalkeeping coach.

Back to his home country in January 2017, Pizarro joined Deportivo Municipal's staff as a goalkeeping coach, but was appointed interim manager of the club on 22 May of that year, after Marcelo Grioni left. He later worked as a goalkeeping coach of UTC and Ecosem Pasco, being appointed manager of the latter on 27 March 2023.

Pizarro returned to UTC on 24 May 2023, now being named manager. He left on a mutual agreement on 25 July, after one win in five matches.

== Honours ==
=== Player ===
Sporting Cristal

- Torneo Descentralizado: 1991, 2005

Alianza Lima

- Torneo Descentralizado: 1997, 2006
