= FC Cajamarca =

Cajamarca
- Full name: Fútbol Club Cajamarca
- Nickname: Azul y Oro
- Founded: 5 January 2023; 3 years ago
- Ground: Estadio Héroes de San Ramón
- Capacity: 18,450
- Chairman: Edisson Zavaleta
- Manager: Santiago Acasiete
- 2026: Liga 1, 17th of 18
- Website: https://www.fccajamarca.com/
Home colours	Away colours

Fútbol Club Cajamarca, commonly known as FC Cajamarca or Cajamarca, is a Peruvian football club based in the city of Cajamarca, Peru. It was founded in 2023 and participates in the Liga 1, the highest tier in the Peruvian football league system.

== History ==
=== 2023: Foundation and Early Years ===
The club was founded on January 5, 2023, in the city of Cajamarca. That same year, they qualified for the National Stage of the 2023 Copa Perú as the departmental runners-up, after ADA de Cajabamba—who had originally secured qualification—were disqualified from the competition due to the improper registration of a player.

However, once in the regular stage, the Cajamarca-based side failed to meet expectations. They managed to collect only two points, both from home draws against Defensor Porvenir and ADA Jaén. As a result, they were eliminated from the tournament after finishing 46th in the overall standings.

=== 2024: Copa Perú Runners-up and Promotion to the Liga 2 ===
The club qualified for the National Stage of the 2024 Copa Perú after winning the Liga Departamental de Cajamarca. Cajamarca reached the final, gaining promotion to the Liga 2. In the final, Cajamarca lost the final to Bentín Tacna Heroica in a penalty shoot out.

=== 2025: Liga 2 Champions and Promotion to the Liga 1 ===
In 2025, just two years after their foundation, the Cajamarca-based club was registered to compete in the 2025 Liga 2 season, being placed in Group 1 of the regular stage. Their professional debut took place on April 6, when they secured a 2–0 home victory over Deportivo Llacuabamba. From that match onward, the team established itself as one of the revelations of the campaign, recording eight wins and finishing top of their group with 25 points. This achievement allowed them to advance to the next stage of the tournament with a two-point bonus.

In the second stage, the club was placed in Group A alongside Deportivo Moquegua, Universidad César Vallejo, Bentín Tacna Heroica, and Carlos A. Mannucci. Unlike the previous round, this phase proved far more balanced and tightly contested, going down to the final matchday. In the decisive fixture, the Cajamarca side secured a crucial 3–1 away victory over Mannucci, a result that saw them finish top of the group with 14 points—one point clear of second place—and advance directly to the play-off semifinals.

In the semifinals, they faced Universidad César Vallejo, who had previously knocked out Comerciantes in the quarterfinals. The first leg, played in Trujillo, ended in a goalless draw. In the return leg in Cajamarca, the home side delivered a dominant performance, securing a convincing 3–0 victory to book their place in the Liga 2 final.

The 2025 Liga 2 final pitted the Cajamarca side against Deportivo Moquegua, who had eliminated Unión Comercio in the semifinals. In the first leg, played in Moquegua, the Cajamarca team suffered a setback. Despite a goal from Carlos Meza, strikes by Jefferson Collazos and José Granda Bravo gave the Moquegua side the edge in the tie.

In the return leg at Estadio Cristo el Señor in Cajamarca, the home team mounted a comeback on aggregate thanks to goals from Denylson Chávez and Hairo Tímana, sealing a 3–2 overall victory. With that result, the club were crowned Liga 2 champions in their debut professional season, earning promotion to Liga 1, in a remarkably short span since their foundation.

=== 2026: Season in Liga 1 ===
Promoted to Liga 1 in 2026, Cajamarca failed to stay up and was relegated following the final matchday of the season, after a 5–0 defeat to Alianza Lima.

== Stadium ==
Cajamarca plays their home games at Estadio Héroes de San Ramón, located in Cajamarca. The club shares the stadium with UTC, who also plays in the Liga 1. The stadium has a capacity of 18,405.

== Honours ==
=== Senior titles ===
Keys

- Record
- ^{(s)} Shared record

Type	Competition	Titles	Runner-up	Winning years	Runner-up years
National (League)	Liga 2	1	—	2025	—
National (League)	Copa Perú	—	1	—	2024
Regional (League)	Liga Departamental de Cajamarca	1	1	2024	2023
Regional (League)	Liga Provincial de Cajamarca	2	—	2023, 2024	—
Regional (League)	Liga Distrital de Cajamarca	2	—	2023, 2024	—

== See also ==
- List of football clubs in Peru
- Peruvian football league system
