= José Soto (footballer, born 1970) =

Peruvian footballer and manager (born 1970)

Personal information
- Full name: José Alberto Soto Gómez
- Date of birth: 11 January 1970 (age 56)
- Place of birth: Lima, Peru
- Height: 1.82 m (6 ft 0 in)
- Position: Centre-back

Team information
- Current team: Deportivo Moquegua (manager)

Senior career*
Years	Team	Apps	(Gls)
1987–1992	Deportivo Municipal	157	(13)
1993–1996	Sporting Cristal	149	(20)
1996–1999	Puebla	59	(5)
1999	Alianza Lima	18	(0)
2000–2001	Celaya	42	(3)
2001–2006	Alianza Lima	199	(36)
Total		624	(77)

International career
1992–2003	Peru	75	(3)

Managerial career
- 2008: Alianza Lima (caretaker)
- 2009–2011: Alianza Lima (assistant)
- 2012: Alianza Lima
- 2013: León de Huánuco
- 2014: Carlos A. Mannucci
- 2015: Alianza Universidad
- 2016: Alfredo Salinas
- 2017: Deportivo Hualgayoc
- 2017–2019: Carlos A. Mannucci
- 2019–2021: Juan Aurich
- 2022: Sport Chavelines
- 2022–2023: Santos de Nasca
- 2024: Deportivo Coopsol
- 2024: Defensor Porvenir
- 2024: Atlético Torino
- 2024: Deportivo El Inca
- 2025: Deportivo Llacuabamba
- 2025: Deportivo El Inca
- 2025–2026: Alianza Arenal
- 2026–: Deportivo Moquegua
- * Club domestic league appearances and goals

José Alberto "Pepe" Soto Gómez (born 11 January 1970) is a Peruvian football manager and former player. He is the current manager of Deportivo Moquegua.

Nicknamed "Pepe," Soto played as a central defender and spent the majority of his playing career with Alianza Lima. He is the brother of footballers Jorge Soto and Giancarlo Soto.

== Club career ==
Soto was born in Lima. He started his club career with Deportivo Municipal in 1987. He also played for Sporting Cristal and Alianza Lima in Peru.

Soto spent several seasons playing in Mexico, joining Puebla in the Invierno 1996 season and remaining with the club until 1998. He also represented Celaya during 1999 and 2000.

== International career ==
Soto obtained 75 international caps for the Peru national team, scoring three goals. He made his debut on 25 November 1992, in a 1–1 draw against Ecuador, and played his last international match at age 33 in a World Cup qualifying defeat against Chile on 9 September 2003. Soto's international career included the Copa América tournaments of 1993, 1995, 1999, and 2001.

== Coaching career ==
On 17 December 2011, Soto was appointed head manager of Alianza Lima for the start of the 2012 Torneo Descentralizado season.

== Personal life ==
Has a son named Jose Soto and a daughter named Maria Soto. The mother of his children is Monica De La Jara. He is also the older brother of Jorge Soto and Giancarlo Soto.

== Honours ==
=== Player ===
Sporting Cristal

- Torneo Descentralizado: 1995

Alianza Lima

- Apertura: 2001, 2004, 2006
- Clausura: 2003
- Torneo Descentralizado: 2001, 2003, 2004, 2006

=== Manager ===
Alianza Lima

- Peruvian Reserve League: 2011
