= Sociedad Tiro 28 =

Peruvian football club

- Full name: Club Deportivo Sociedad Tiro N° 28
- Founded: July 19, 1907; 119 years ago
- Ground: Estadio Daniel Alcides Carrión, Cerro de Pasco
- Capacity: 12,000
- League: Copa Perú

Sociedad Tiro 28 is a Peruvian football club, playing in the city of Cerro de Pasco.

The club were founded 19 July 1907 and plays in the Copa Perú, which is the third division of the Peruvian league.

== History ==
The club was founded on July 19, 1907, at the initiative of Pedro Agusto Benavides in the Smelter Foundry, in the town of Smelter in the Tinyahuarco District. It currently has the support of ECOSEM Smelter, a communal company dedicated to mining and construction.

In the 2023 Copa Perú, the club qualified to the National Stage, but was eliminated by Miguel Grau in the Round of 32.

== Honours ==
=== Senior titles ===
Keys

- Record
- ^{(s)} Shared record

Type	Competition	Titles	Runner-up	Winning years	Runner-up years
Regional (League)	Liga Departamental de Pasco	1	3	2024, 2026	2014, 2015, 2023
Regional (League)	Liga Provincial de Pasco	2	1	2024, 2026	2023
Regional (League)	Liga Distrital de Tinyahuarco	2	—	2023, 2024	—

== See also ==
- List of football clubs in Peru
- Peruvian football league system
