= Estadio Daniel Alcides Carrión =

Multi-use stadium in Cerro de Pasco, Peru

Coordinates: 10.6850°S 76.2480°W

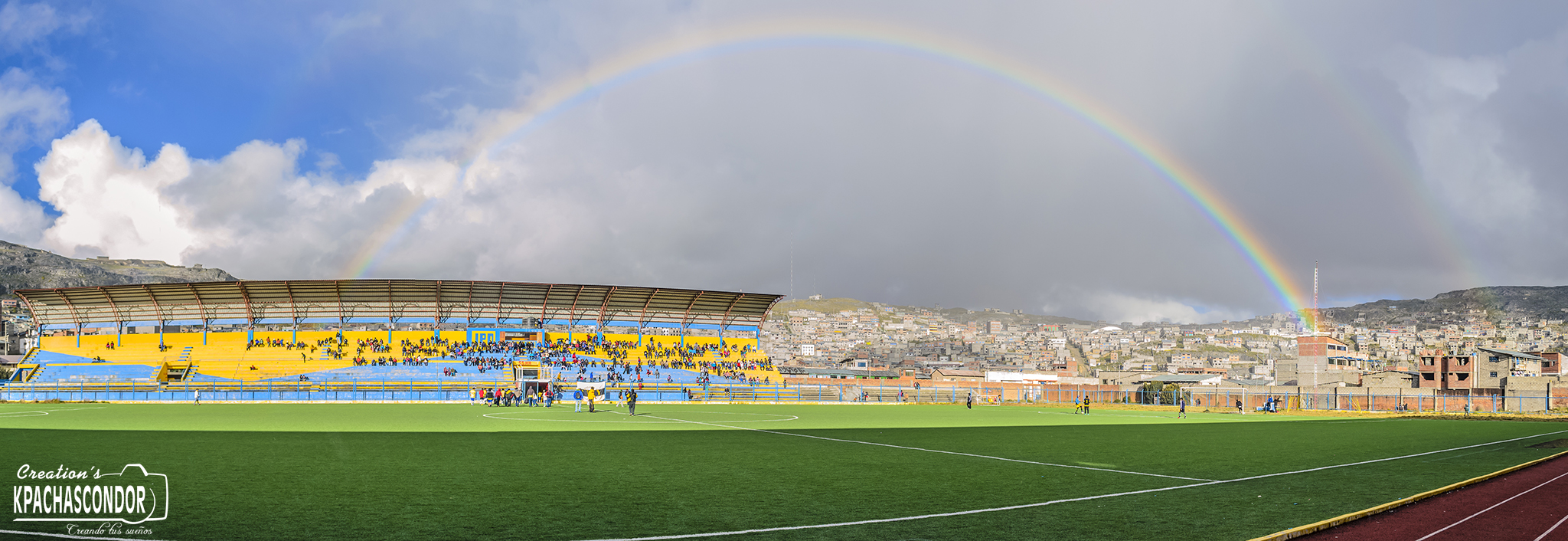
- Interactive map of Estadio Daniel Alcides Carrión
- Location: Cerro de Pasco, Peru
- Elevation: 4,338 m (14,232 ft)
- Capacity: 12,000
- Surface: Artificial turf

Construction
- Opened: 1960
- Renovated: 2012

Tenants
- Unión Minas; Ecosem Pasco

Estadio Daniel Alcides Carrión is a multi-use stadium located in Cerro de Pasco, Peru. It is the home ground of football teams Unión Minas of the Liga 2, and Ecosem Pasco of the Liga 3. The stadium holds 12,000 people and according to FIFA, it is the highest stadium in the world, with an altitude of 4,338 meters (13,973 ft) above sea level. This makes it very difficult for players who are not used to playing at this height and has caused some controversy.

== History ==
The Estadio Daniel Alcides Carrión was constructed in the 1960s with an initial capacity of 8,000. The stadium has since been used by home team Unión Minas. The club has played in the Peruvian Primera División since 1986 up until 2001, where they were relegated to the Copa Perú where they currently still participate. In its time in top flight, the stadium has caused some controversy by visiting teams, who were not acclimated to the high altitude and cold climate of the city. Between 1991 and 1992, Unión Minas were unbeaten at home. This home advantage allowed Unión Minas to stay in the first division for 16 years before being relegated.

One of the most iconic moments at the stadium was when on 25 June 2000, giants Universitario de Deportes of Lima defeated home team Unión Minas 2-1. This win allowed Universitario to win the Torneo Apertura and later the 2000 Torneo Descentralizado.

In 2012, the stadium underwent significant renovations. Natural grass was replaced by synthetic grass to maintain optimal conditions throughout the year, since being at such a high altitude the grass has difficulty growing. The stadium was also expanded from a capacity of 8,000 to 12,000.

== See also ==
- Ecosem Pasco
- Unión Minas
- List of football stadiums in Peru
- List of stadiums
