= Estadio Víctor Montoya Segura =

Stadium in Jaén, Peru

- Interactive map of Estadio Víctor Montoya Segura
- Location: Jaén, Peru
- Coordinates: 5.4203°N 5.700905°W
- Capacity: 9,000
- Surface: Grass

Construction
- Opened: 1962

Tenant
- ADA

Estadio Víctor Montoya Segura is a football stadium located in the city of Jaén, Peru. It is the home stadium of football club ADA of the Peruvian Segunda División. The stadium holds 9,000 people and was opened in 1962.
