= Estadio Jorge Basadre =

Peruvian multi-purpose stadium

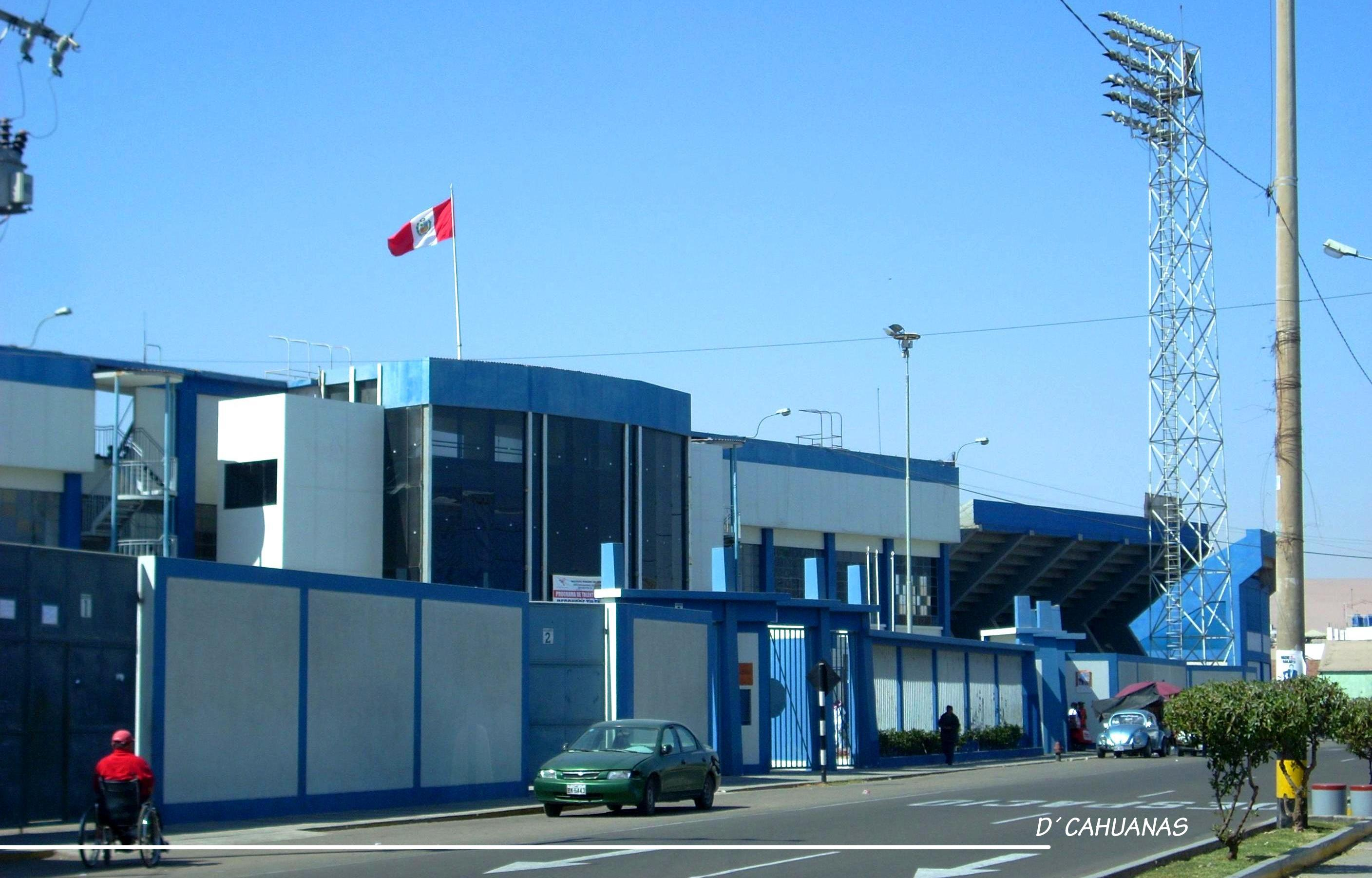
- Interactive map of Estadio Jorge Basadre
- Full name: Estadio Jorge Basadre (full name)
- Former names: Estadio Modelo
- Location: Tacna, Peru
- Coordinates: 18°0′18″S 70°15′11″W
- Owner: Instituto Peruano del Deporte
- Capacity: 20,000 (football)
- Surface: Grass
- Field size: 105 x 70 meters

Construction
- Built: 2000
- Opened: 2000
- Renovated: 2004

Tenants
- Coronel Bolognesi; Bentín Tacna Heroica

The Estadio Jorge Basadre, previously known as the Estadio Modelo, is a multi-purpose stadium in Tacna, Peru named after historian Jorge Basadre. It is currently used as a football stadium in the Copa Perú by Coronel Bolognesi and Bentín Tacna Heroica, of the Segunda División. The stadium holds 19,850 people and has 277 individual seats in the western stand, 69 which are for the VIP area. The rest of the stadium has standing terraces. The name was changed when it was renovated for the Copa America 2004. It will be used again for the 2019 FIFA U-17 World Cup.
