= High-altitude football controversy =

Controversy over FIFA ban on high-altitude matches

- Date: May 2007 – May 2008
- Venue: Various high-altitude stadiums
- Location: South America
- Type: Sports controversy
- Cause: FIFA’s temporary ban on international matches above 2,500 meters
- Participants: FIFA, CONMEBOL, national football associations, players
- Outcome: Ban revoked in May 2008

A dispute arose in May 2007 when FIFA imposed a temporary ban on international football matches held at altitudes exceeding 2,500 metres (8,200 ft) above sea level. The ban was justified by concerns over player health and the competitive imbalance for teams unaccustomed to high-altitude conditions. The ruling particularly affected Bolivia, Ecuador, and Colombia, restricting their ability to host World Cup qualification matches in high-altitude cities like La Paz and Quito. After significant protest and negotiations, the ban was revoked in May 2008.

== Background ==
The controversy originated from complaints lodged by the Brazilian Football Confederation (CBF), which argued that playing at high altitudes posed significant health risks to players not acclimatized to such conditions. The issue gained prominence following an incident involving the Brazilian club Flamengo, whose players required bottled oxygen during a 2007 Copa Libertadores match against Real Potosí in Potosí, Bolivia, at an altitude of 3,967 metres (13,015 ft). The adverse conditions, compounded by inclement weather, led Flamengo and other Brazilian clubs to express concerns and threaten boycotts of matches at high-altitude venues. These complaints contributed to FIFA’s decision to introduce the ban.

== FIFA ratification ==
In response to these concerns, FIFA’s Executive Committee announced a temporary ban on international matches played above 2,500 metres (8,200 ft). The ruling stipulated that players would need to arrive at least one week prior to matches held at altitudes between 2,500 metres (8,200 ft) and 3,000 metres (9,800 ft), and at least two weeks prior for matches above 3,000 metres (9,800 ft), to allow adequate acclimatization. This effectively prevented some South American nations, including Bolivia and Ecuador, from hosting international fixtures in high-altitude cities.

=== National reception ===
President Evo Morales denounced the ban as discriminatory, describing it as a form of 'football apartheid,' arguing that it marginalized high-altitude nations. Morales convened an emergency cabinet meeting and initiated a campaign to overturn the ban, emphasizing the principle of universality in sports. He argued that the ban infringed upon the rights of nations with high-altitude regions and called for solidarity among other countries to challenge FIFA’s decision.

The campaign against the ban garnered support from prominent football figures, including Diego Maradona. To protest FIFA’s decision, he played in an exhibition match at the Hernando Siles Stadium in La Paz (3,600 metres), highlighting that football could still be played competitively at high altitudes. Maradona’s team secured a 7–4 victory over a Bolivian team led by President Morales, symbolizing a protest against the ban.

=== FIFA's response ===
Despite initial resistance, FIFA modified the ban in June 2007, raising the altitude threshold from 2,500 metres (8,200 ft) to 3,000 metres (9,800 ft). This adjustment reduced the impact on some cities but continued to exclude venues like La Paz. South American football associations, excluding Brazil, expressed their opposition to the ban and committed to playing matches at venues selected by the host nations, regardless of altitude.

== Repeal of ban ==
In May 2008, following a formal protest from the South American Football Confederation (CONMEBOL), FIFA’s Executive Committee unanimously agreed to suspend the altitude ban. The protest was supported by all CONMEBOL member associations except Brazil. FIFA President Sepp Blatter acknowledged the need for further research on the effects of extreme conditions, including altitude, temperature, humidity, and pollution, on player health. Blatter stated, “Let us reopen the discussion,” signaling a willingness to consider scientific evidence before implementing measures.

Despite occasional discussions—such as Blatter’s 2010 statement that altitude was 'not on FIFA’s agenda'—the ban was never reinstated, allowing high-altitude nations to continue hosting international matches.

== Aftermath ==
Prior to the 2010 FIFA World Cup in South Africa, England defender John Terry expressed concerns with acclimatising to the altitude in the country. Ahead of the tournament, England and Italy conducted their pre-tournament training at Irdning, Austria and Sestriere respectively in bids to acclimatise to the higher altitude in South Africa. Seven of the ten stadiums used in the tournament were 660 metres (2,200 ft) above sea level or higher.

In 2017, Brazil forward Neymar posted photos on social media of Brazilian players with oxygen masks before their 2018 World Cup qualification game against Bolivia in the Hernando Siles Stadium and commented that it is "inhumane" to play under those conditions.

During the 2026 FIFA World Cup, the Estadio Azteca in Mexico City, situated at 2,240 metres (7,300 ft) above sea level, hosted five games during the tournament, leading to a reemergence of the discussion of playing football at a high altitude in international football.

== See also ==
- Effects of high altitude on humans
- 2010 FIFA World Cup qualification (CONMEBOL)
