= Marcelo Grioni =

Argentine football manager

Personal information
- Full name: Marcelo Fabián Grioni
- Date of birth: 27 July 1966 (age 60)
- Place of birth: Marcos Juárez, Argentina
- Height: 1.65 m (5 ft 5 in)
- Position: Midfielder

Team information
- Current team: ADA (manager)

Youth career
- Newell's Old Boys

Senior career*
Years	Team	Apps	(Gls)
1987–1988	Newell's Old Boys	5	(0)
1989	Correcaminos UAT	0	(0)
1989–1992	Almirante Brown		
1992–1993	Platense	32	(1)
1993–1994	Almirante Brown		
1994–1995	Atlético Tucumán	30	(3)
1995–1996	Gimnasia y Tiro	30	(5)
1996–1997	Deportivo Morón	34	(2)
1997–1998	Argentino de Rosario	26	(6)
1998–2000	Douglas Haig	35	(4)

Managerial career
- 2004: Argentino de Rosario (assistant)
- 2007: Newell's Old Boys (assistant)
- 2008: Estudiantes LP (assistant)
- 2009–2011: Newell's Old Boys (assistant)
- 2012–2013: Colón (assistant)
- 2013: Douglas Haig
- 2014: Racing Teodelina
- 2014–2015: Atlético Rafaela (assistant)
- 2016: Deportivo Municipal (youth)
- 2016–2017: Deportivo Municipal
- 2017: Real Garcilaso
- 2018–2019: Sport Huancayo
- 2019–2021: Cienciano
- 2021–2022: Cusco
- 2022–2023: UTC
- 2024–: ADA
- * Club domestic league appearances and goals

Marcelo Fabián Grioni (born 27 July 1966) is an Argentine football manager and former player who played as a midfielder. He is the current manager of Peruvian club ADA.

== Playing career ==
Grioni was born in Marcos Juárez, and was a Newell's Old Boys youth graduate. After making his first team debut in 1987, he appeared rarely and moved to Correcaminos UAT for a short spell, but never played.

Back to his home country in 1989, Grioni featured regularly for Almirante Brown before joining top-tier side Platense in 1992. He returned to Brown in the following year, but failed to settle for a team for the remainder of his career, and went on to represent Almirante Brown, Atlético Tucumán, Gimnasia y Tiro, Deportivo Morón, Argentino de Rosario and Douglas Haig. He retired with the latter in 2000, aged 34.

== Managerial career ==
Grioni started his career in 2004, as Pablo Marini's assistant at Argentino de Rosario. He then followed Marini to Newell's Old Boys in 2007, before joining Roberto Sensini's staff at Estudiantes de La Plata in 2008.

Grioni continued to work with Sensini at Newell's and Colón before being named manager of Douglas Haig on 15 September 2013. He resigned on 26 November, and returned to work with Sensini at Atlético de Rafaela after a brief spell at Racing Teodelina.

In 2016, Grioni moved to Peru, after being named manager of Deportivo Municipal's reserve sides. He was named interim manager in February, before being appointed permanent manager in the following month.

On 20 May 2017, Grioni was sacked from Municipal, and took over Real Garcilaso on 1 June. On 12 December, after his contract was due to expire, he was named in charge of Sport Huancayo.

Grioni was relieved from his duties on 26 March 2019, and was appointed in charge of Cienciano on 11 June. He achieved promotion to the top tier with the club as champions in his first season, and after narrowly missing out qualification to the Copa Sudamericana in his second, he renewed his contract until 2022 on 14 July 2020.

Grioni resigned from Cusco on 6 April 2022, and was presented at UTC late in the month. He left the latter club on a mutual agreement on 14 May 2023.

== Honours ==
=== Manager ===
Cienciano

- Peruvian Segunda División: 2019
