= FC San Marcos de Huari =

FC San Marcos
- Full name: Fútbol Club San Marcos
- Nickname: Leones
- Founded: 2022; 4 years ago
- Ground: Estadio Rosas Pampa
- Capacity: 20,000
- League: Liga 2
- 2024: Liga 2, 8th of 16
Home colours

Fútbol Club San Marcos (sometimes referred as San Marcos) is a Peruvian football club, playing in the city of Huaraz, Ancash, Peru. They currently play in the Peruvian Segunda División.

== History ==
Fútbol Club San Marcos was founded in 2022.

The club was the 2023 Liga Departamental de Ancash champion after defeating Star Ancash in the final. In the 2023 Copa Perú, the club qualified for the 2024 Liga 2 for the first time after defeating Defensor Porvenir in the quarterfinals. San Marcos would be runner-up for that years Copa Peru edition.

On April 16, 2026, FC San Marcos issued a statement announcing its voluntary withdrawal from the current season of the Liga 2, due to economic and financial difficulties that prevent it from continuing its participation in the promotion tournament.

== Stadium ==
San Marcos plays their home games at Estadio Rosas Pampa in Huaraz. It has a capacity of 20,000 spectators.

== Honours ==
=== Senior titles ===
Keys

- Record
- ^{(s)} Shared record

Type	Competition	Titles	Runner-up	Winning years	Runner-up years
National (League)	Copa Perú	—	1	—	2023
Regional (League)	Liga Departamental de Áncash	1	—	2023	—
Regional (League)	Liga Provincial de Huari	—	1	—	2023
Regional (League)	Liga Distrital de Huari	1	—	2023	—

== See also ==
- List of football clubs in Peru
- Peruvian football league system
