= Ecosem Pasco =

Peruvian football club

- Full name: Club Deportivo Ecosem Pasco
- Nickname(s): Azulgranas
- Founded: February 25, 2022; 3 years ago
- Ground: Estadio Daniel Alcides Carrión
- Capacity: 12,000
- Chairman: Eder Celis Cristóbal
- Manager: Jose Hermitaño Atencio
- League: Liga 3
Home colours	Away colours

Club Deportivo Ecosem Pasco is a Peruvian football club, based in the city of Cerro de Pasco. The club were founded in 2022 and plays in the Peruvian Tercera División, which is the third tier of Peruvian football.

== History ==
Ecosem Pasco was founded on 25 February, 2022 by the initiative of Frank Orbezo Lopez and a group of community members from the town of Huaraucaca, in the Tinyahuarco district, and financed by ECOSEM Huaraucaca, a communal company dedicated to the mining and transportation sectors.

In the 2022 Copa Perú, the club qualified to the National Stage, but was eliminated by Deportivo Garcilaso in the quarterfinals.

In the 2023 Copa Perú, the club qualified to the National Stage, but was eliminated by UCV Moquegua in the quarterfinals.

== Stadium ==
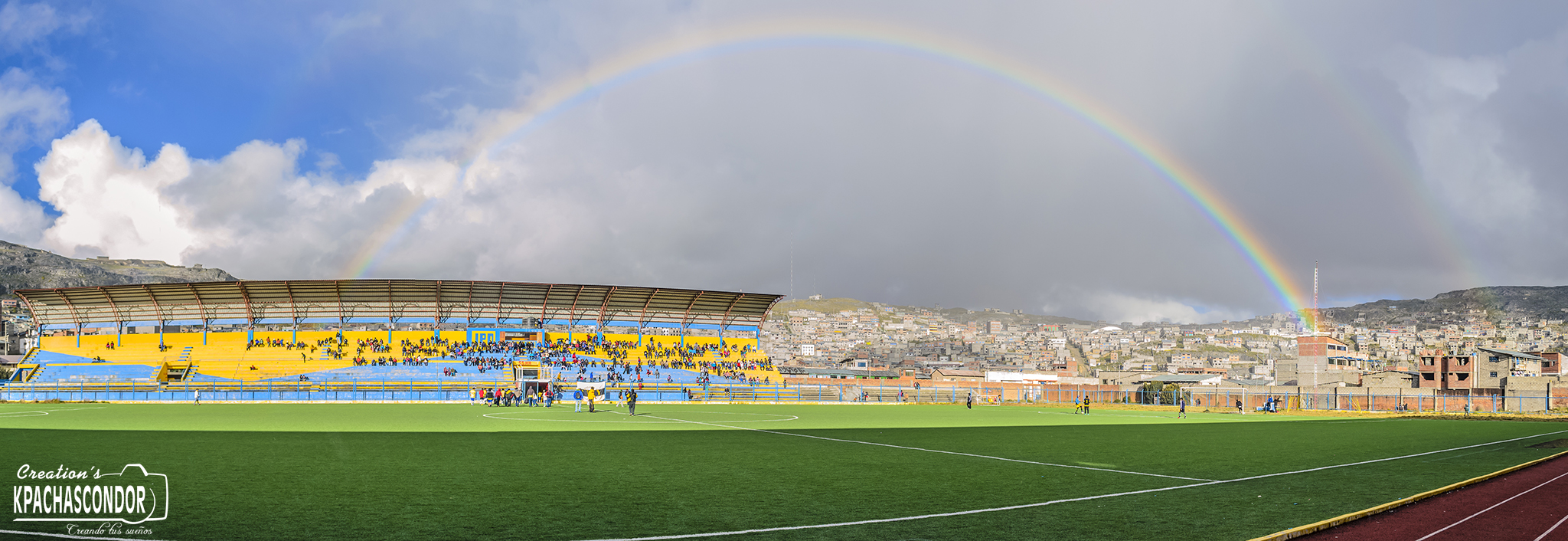
Estadio Daniel Alcides Carrión

Ecosem Pasco plays their home games at Estadio Daniel Alcides Carrión, located in Cerro de Pasco. The stadium is recognized by FIFA as the highest stadium in the world. This often gives the home teams an advantage against visiting teams who are not acclimated to the altitude. The stadium has a capacity of 12,000.

== Managers ==
- (Peru) Elmer Castro (2022)
- (Peru) Juan Carlos Bazalar (2022)
- (Peru) Roberto Arrelucea (2022-2023)
- (Peru) Francisco Pizarro (2023)
- (Peru) Erick Torres (2023)
- (Peru) Mario Flores (2023)
- (Peru) Roberto Tristán (2024)
- (Peru) Tomás Reyes (2025)
- (Peru) Jose Hermitaño Atencio (2025-)

== Honours ==
=== Senior titles ===
Keys

- Record
- ^{(s)} Shared record

Type	Competition	Titles	Runner-up	Winning years	Runner-up years
Regional (League)	Liga Departamental de Pasco	2	1	2022, 2023	2024
Regional (League)	Liga Provincial de Pasco	—	1	—	2022
Regional (League)	Liga Distrital de Tinyahuarco	1	—	2022	—

== See also ==
- List of football clubs in Peru
- Peruvian football league system
