= Asociación Deportiva Agropecuaria =

Peruvian football club

ADA
- Full name: Asociación Deportiva Agropecuaria
- Nickname: La Verde Amarela
- Founded: May 12, 1953; 73 years ago
- Ground: Estadio Víctor Montoya Segura
- Capacity: 9,000
- Chairman: Rony Laván Guerrero
- Manager: Marcelo Grioni
- League: Liga 2
- 2024: Liga 2, 9th of 16
Home colours	Away colours

Asociación Deportiva Agropecuaria (sometimes referred as ADA) is a Peruvian football club, playing in the city of Jaén, Peru. Founded in 1953, the club participates in the Peruvian Segunda División.

== History ==
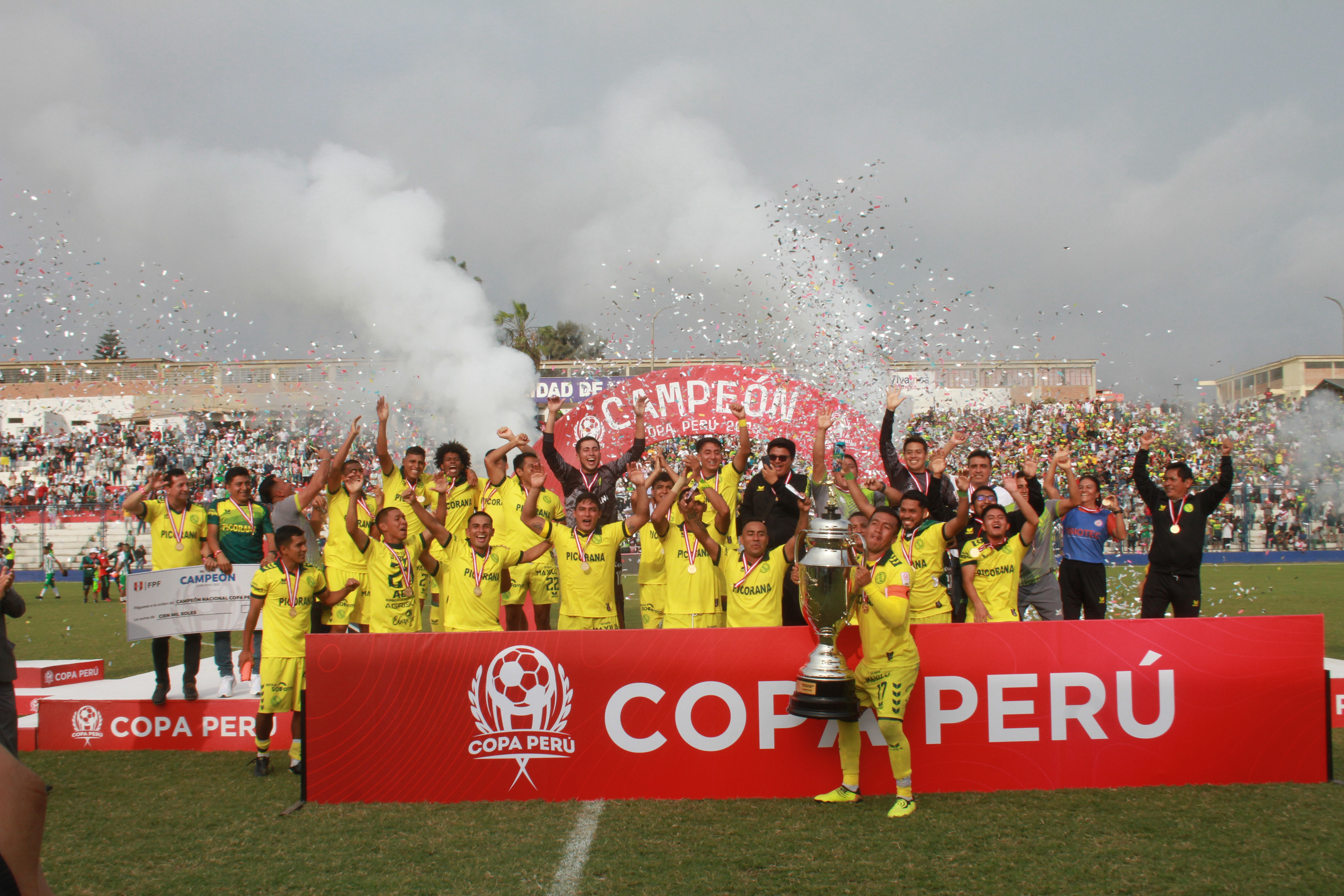
2023 Copa Perú champions, ADA.

The Asociación Deportiva Agropecuaria was founded on May 12, 1953, in the city of Jaén. The club began by playing in the Liga Distrital de Jaén, part of the Copa Perú.

In the 2006 Copa Perú, the club qualified to the National Stage, but was eliminated by Corazón Micaelino in the Round of 16.

In the 2014 Copa Perú, the club qualified to the Regional Stage, but was eliminated by Sport Chavelines.

In the 2018 Copa Perú, the club qualified to the National Stage, but was eliminated.

In the 2023 Copa Perú, the club qualified for the 2024 Liga 2 after defeating Sport Cáceres in the quarterfinals. Later they would beat San Marcos in the final to win their first Copa Perú title. As a result, they were promoted to the Peruvian Segunda División for the first time in their history.

== Stadium ==
ADA plays their home games at the Estadio Víctor Montoya Segura located in Jaén. The stadium has a capacity of 9,000.

== Rivalries ==
ADA has had a long-standing rivalry with local club Bracamoros.

== Honours ==
=== Senior titles ===
Keys

- Record
- ^{(s)} Shared record

Type	Competition	Titles	Runner-up	Winning years	Runner-up years
National (League)	Copa Perú	1	—	2023	—
Regional (League)	Región II	1	—	2006	—
Regional (League)	Liga Departamental de Cajamarca	8	2	1982, 1984, 1986, 1987, 1990, 1994, 2006, 2023	2014, 2018
Regional (League)	Liga Provincial de Jaén	6	4	1982, 1990, 2014, 2017, 2018, 2019	2008, 2012, 2013, 2023
Regional (League)	Liga Distrital de Jaén	9	3	1975, 1979, 1982, 1990, 2008, 2012, 2013, 2014, 2023	2017, 2018, 2019

== See also ==
- List of football clubs in Peru
- Peruvian football league system
