= Bentín Tacna Heroica =

- Full name: Club Deportivo Esther Grande de Bentín Tacna Heroica
- Nicknames: El Vendaval Azul; El Chelsea Tacneño
- Founded: 14 October 2014; 11 years ago
- Ground: Estadio Jorge Basadre
- Capacity: 19,850
- Chairman: Niel Zavala Meza
- Manager: Walter Sergio Castellanos
- League: Liga 2
- 2024: Copa Perú, 1st (Promoted)
- Website: https://www.bentintacnaheroica.com/
Home colours	Away colours

Club Deportivo Esther Grande de Bentín Tacna Heroica (sometimes referred as EGB Tacna Heroica or Bentín Tacna Heroica) is a Peruvian professional football club, playing in the city of Tacna. Founded in 2014, the club participates in the Peruvian Segunda División after winning the Copa Perú in 2024.

== History ==
Bentín Tacna Heroica was founded on 14 October 2014 in the Alto de la Alianza District, Tacna, with the intention of training new talents within the region. The same year it was founded, the club was the Segunda Division of the District of Alto de la Alianza.

In the 2016 Copa Perú, the club qualified to the National Stage, but was eliminated by Deportivo Hualgayoc in the quarterfinals.

In 2023, the club won the Liga Departamental de Tacna for the first time, qualifying for the 2023 Copa Perú but was eliminated by Nacional FBC in the Round of 32.

The club won the Departamental League again in 2024, qualifying for the 2024 Copa Perú. The club reached the final and won the title for the first time after defeating FC Cajamarca. As a result, Bentín Tacna Heroica was promoted to the Liga 2.

== Stadium ==
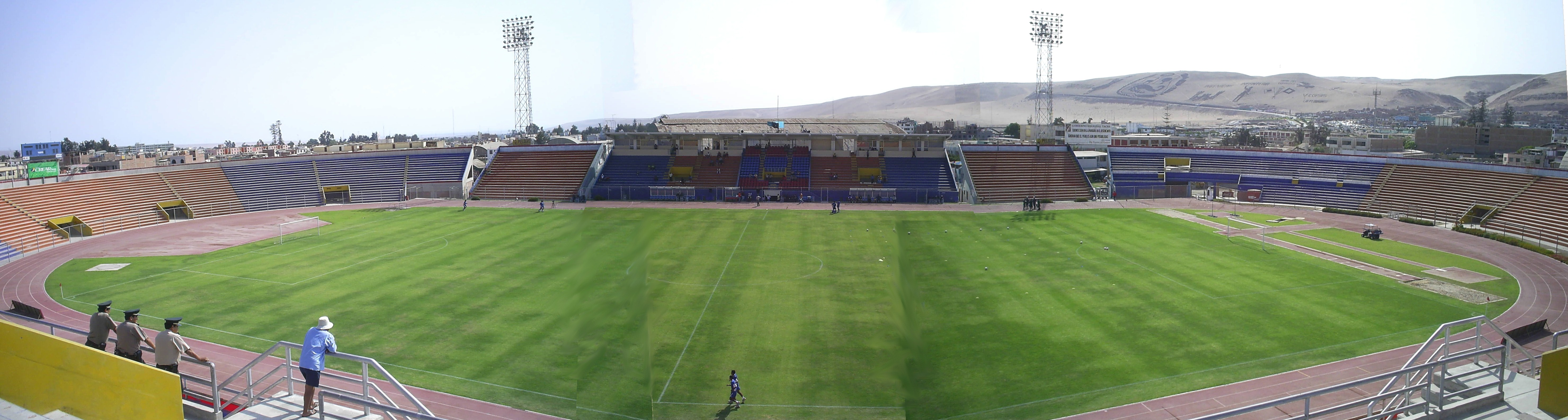
Estadio Jorge Basadre

Bentín Tacna Heroica plays their home games at Estadio Jorge Basadre. Constructed in 2000, the stadium has a capacity of 19,850 and was a venue for the 2004 Copa América. Tacna Heroica's initial stadium was Estadio Alto de la Alianza, however it has been closed due to infrastructure defects.

== Current squad ==
Note: Flags indicate national team as defined under FIFA eligibility rules; some limited exceptions apply. Players may hold more than one non-FIFA nationality.

No.	Pos.	Nation	Player
—	GK	PER	Luis Pretel
—	GK	PER	Michael Sotillo
—	GK	PER	Elliot Chipana
—	DF	PER	John Fajardo
—	DF	PER	Kevin Flores
—	DF	PER	Michael Kaufman
—	DF	PER	José Manzaneda
—	DF	ARG	Oscar Sainz
—	DF	PER	Renato Suárez
—	MF	ARG	Félix Banega
—	MF	PER	Jeremi Escate
—	MF	PER	Julio García
—	MF	PER	Piero León

No.	Pos.	Nation	Player
—	MF	URU	Diego López
—	MF	PER	Kleiber Palomino
—	MF	PER	Diego Ricra
—	MF	PER	Alfredo Rojas
—	MF	PER	Edgar Santillán
—	MF	PER	Sebastián Enciso
—	FW	PER	Claudio García
—	FW	PER	Kevin Laura
—	FW	STP	Luís Leal
—	FW	PER	Mauricio Malpartida
—	FW	PER	Josmar Murillo
—	FW	ARG	Germán Pacheco
—	FW	PER	Joseph Plasencia

== Honours ==
=== Senior titles ===
Keys

- Record
- ^{(s)} Shared record

Type	Competition	Titles	Runner-up	Winning years	Runner-up years
National (League)	Copa Perú	1	—	2024	—
Regional (League)	Liga Departamental de Tacna	2	1	2023, 2024	2016
Regional (League)	Liga Provincial de Tacna	2	1	2023, 2024	2016
Regional (League)	Liga Distrital de Alto de la Alianza	8	—	2015, 2016, 2018, 2019, 2020, 2022, 2023, 2024	—
Regional (League)	Segunda Distrital de Alto de la Alianza	1	—	2014	—

== Managers ==
Manager	Years
(Peru) Nilton Arnao	2016
(Peru) Leonardo Morales	2023
(Peru) Jesús Álvarez	2024–2025
(Argentina) Sergio Castellanos	2025–

== See also ==
- List of football clubs in Peru
- Peruvian football league system
