= Club Deportivo Moquegua =

Peruvian football club

Deportivo Moquegua
- Full name: Club Deportivo Moquegua
- Founded: 17 December 2021; 4 years ago (As UCV Moquegua); 19 December 2024; 23 months ago (As Club Deportivo Moquegua)
- Ground: 25 de Noviembre
- Capacity: 21,073
- President: Ricardo Caldas
- Manager: José Soto
- League: Liga 1
- 2025: Liga 2, 2nd (promoted)
Home colours	Away colours

Club Deportivo Moquegua, shortened to Deportivo Moquegua or CD Moquegua, is a Peruvian professional football club based in Moquegua, Peru. It was founded in 2021 as UCV Moquegua, a sub-division club of the Universidad César Vallejo. In 2024, the club changed their name to Deportivo Moquegua. The club currently plays in the Peruvian Primera Division as of 2026.

== History ==
=== UCV Moquegua ===
UCV Moquegua was founded in December 2021 by the Universidad César Vallejo in Moquegua. The club started playing in the second division of the Liga Districal de Moquegua that same year.

In 2022, UCV Moquegua were runners-up of the league and got promoted to the first division of the Liga Districal de Moquegua. They would become champions of the Distrital and provincial league in 2023, qualifying for the Liga Departamental de Moquegua, and the 2023 Copa Perú. The club reached the semi-finals, but got eliminated by ADA. Regardless, the club got promoted to the Peruvian Segunda División for the first time for reaching the semi-finals.

=== Deportivo Moquegua ===
On 19 December 2024, UCV Moquegua changed its name to Club Deportivo Moquegua in order to give the team a new identity. The club also split from UCV to become an independent club.

In the 2025 Liga 2, Deportivo Moquegua reached the final, losing to FC Cajamarca. They gained promotion to the Liga 1 for the first time after winning the play off round against Universidad César Vallejo

== Stadium ==
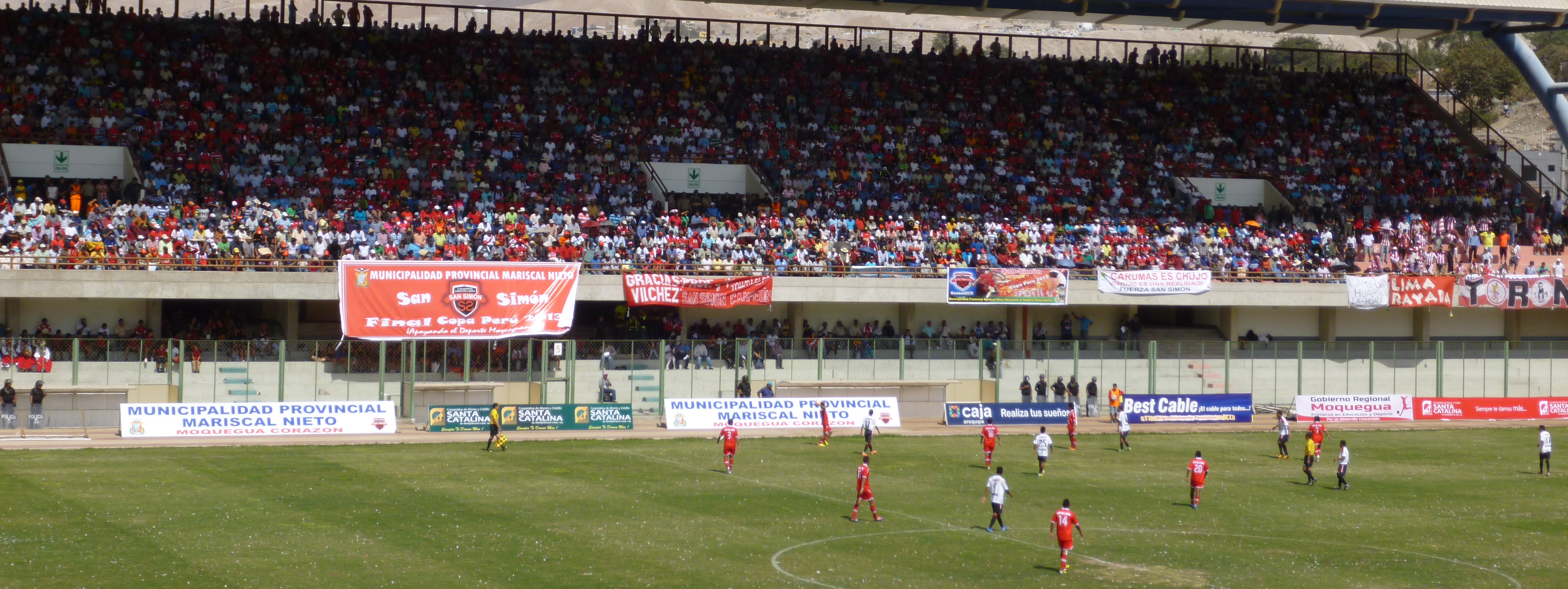
Estadio 25 de Noviembre

Deportivo Moquegua plays their home matches at Estadio 25 de Noviembre. Located in Moquegua, the stadium has a capacity of 21,073, and was set to be a venue of the 2023 FIFA U-17 World Cup until Peru withdrew from hosting.

== Current Squad ==
As of 16 March, 2026

Note: Flags indicate national team as defined under FIFA eligibility rules; some limited exceptions apply. Players may hold more than one non-FIFA nationality.

No.	Pos.	Nation	Player
1	GK	PER	Carlos Grados
3	DF	PAR	Cristian Enciso
4	DF	PER	Aldair Perleche
5	DF	PER	Brayan Rivera
6	DF	PER	Jimmy Jiménez
7	FW	ECU	Edgar Lastre
8	MF	PER	Cristian Mejía
9	FW	PER	Marcello Negrón
10	MF	PAR	Nicolás Chávez
11	FW	ECU	Bryan Angulo
12	GK	PER	William Falcón
13	DF	PER	Juan Lojas
14	MF	PER	Claudio Ramírez

No.	Pos.	Nation	Player
15	DF	PER	Nicolás Amasifuén
16	FW	PER	Allonso Dávila
17	FW	COL	Yorman Zapata
20	MF	PER	Diego Ramírez
22	DF	PER	Eros Montenegro
24	DF	PER	Kevin Moreno
25	MF	PER	Ricardo Chipao
28	MF	PER	José López
29	GK	PER	Renzo Figueroa
30	DF	PER	José Granda
77	FW	PER	Kevin Ruiz
90	FW	COL	Jefferson Collazos

== Honours ==
=== Senior titles ===
Keys

- Record
- ^{(s)} Shared record

Type	Competition	Titles	Runner-up	Winning years	Runner-up years
National (League)	Liga 2	—	1	—	2025
Regional (League)	Liga Departamental de Moquegua	—	1	—	2023
Regional (League)	Liga Provincial de Mariscal Nieto	1	—	2023	—
Regional (League)	Liga Distrital de Moquegua	1	—	2023	—
Regional (League)	Segunda Distrital de Moquegua	—	1	—	2022
