= Defensor Porvenir =

- Full name: Club Deportivo Defensor Porvenir Olaya
- Founded: May 17, 1964; 61 years ago
- Ground: Estadio Víctor Raúl Haya De La Torre; El Porvenir
- Chairman: Carlos Arteaga
- League: Copa Perú
Home colours	Away colours

Club Defensor Porvenir (sometimes referred as Defensor Porvenir) is a Peruvian football club, playing in the city of El Porvenir, Trujillo, La Libertad, Peru.

== History ==
The Club Defensor Porvenir was founded on May 17, 1964.

In 2004 Copa Perú, the club qualified to the Regional Stage, but was eliminated in the Group stage.

In 2008 Copa Perú, the club qualified to the National Stage, but was eliminated by Atlético Torino in the Round of 16.

In 2015, the club qualified for the Liga Provincial's Final Stage, being eliminated after finishing in third place behind Carlos Tenaud and Víctor Arana.

== Honours ==
=== Regional ===
- Liga Departamental de La Libertad:

Winners (2): 2004, 2023
Runner-up (1): 2008

- Liga Provincial de Trujillo:

Winners (1): 2016
Runner-up (2): 2008, 2023

- Liga Distrital de El Porvenir:

Winners (5): 2008, 2014, 2015, 2016, 2023
Runner-up (1): 2017

== See also ==
- List of football clubs in Peru
- Peruvian football league system
