= 2024 Copa Perú =

Copa Perú
- Season: 2024
- Champions: Bentín Tacna Heroica (1st title)
- Promoted: Bentín Tacna Heroica; Cajamarca

The 2024 Peru Cup season (Spanish: Copa Perú 2024), the largest amateur tournament of Peruvian football. The District Stage (Spanish: Ligas Distritales) started in February - March, and the National Stage (Spanish: Etapa Nacional) started in November. The winner and runner-up were promoted to the Liga 2.

In 2024, the Peruvian Football Federation, taking into account CONMEBOL's observations, then decides that the Copa Perú would be the tournament that decides the participants in a meritorious manner, based on the original idea from years ago: the 25 representatives of each department that are best placed in the final table of the 2024 Copa Perú's National Stage, whether the departmental champion or runner-up and except for those promoted to Liga 2, will be the clubs that will play the first edition of Liga 3 in the year 2025.

== Team changes ==
Relegated from 2023 Liga 2	Promoted to 2024 Liga 2
▼ Alfonso Ugarte (14th)	▲ADA (1st) ▲ San Marcos (2nd) ▲ Juan Pablo II College (3rd) ▲UCV Moquegua (4th)

== Departmental stage ==
Departmental Stage: 2024 Ligas Departamentales del Perú

The following list shows the teams that qualified for the National Stage.

Department	Team	Location
Amazonas	Unión Santo Domingo	Chachapoyas
Amazonas	Cajaruro	Cajaruro
Ancash	Centro Social Pariacoto	Pariacoto
Ancash	Alianza Arenal	Moro
Apurímac	Miguel Grau	Abancay
Apurímac	Defensor José María Arguedas	Andahuaylas
Arequipa	Viargoca	Atico, Caravelí
Arequipa	Nacional	Mollendo
Ayacucho	Señor de Quinuapata	Ayacucho
Ayacucho	Nuevo San Cristóbal	Pichari
Cajamarca	Cajamarca	Cajamarca
Cajamarca	Cultural Volante	Bambamarca
Callao	Scratch	Bellavista
Callao	Amazon Callao	Callao
Cusco	Juventud Progreso	Cusco
Cusco	Juventud Alfa	Pisac
Huancavelica	UDA	Ascensión
Huancavelica	Sport Machete	Lircay
Huánuco	Construcción Civil	Huánuco
Huánuco	Deportivo Municipal (Tingo María)	Tingo María
Ica	Juventud Santo Domingo	Nazca
Ica	Sport Nacional	Santiago, Ica
Junín	Deportivo Sucre	Huancán
Junín	Deportivo Municipal (Pangoa)	Pangoa
La Libertad	Juventus	Huamachuco
La Libertad	El Inca	Chao

Department	Team	Location
Lambayeque	Deportivo Lute	Lagunas, Chiclayo
Lambayeque	Unión Juventud San Martín	Olmos
Lima	Real Independiente	Santa María, Huaura
Lima	Pacífico	San Martín de Porres
Loreto	Estudiantil CNI	Iquitos
Loreto	Dolce Bretaña	Puinahua
Madre de Dios	Alto Rendimiento	Inambari
Madre de Dios	AFC Caychihue	Huepetuhe
Moquegua	Real San Antonio	Mariscal Nieto
Moquegua	Hijos del Altiplano y del Pacífico	Ilo
Pasco	Sociedad Tiro 28	Tinyahuarco
Pasco	Ecosem Pasco	Tinyahuarco
Piura	Juventud Cautivo	San Miguel de El Faique
Piura	Deportivo Municipal (Vice)	Vice, Sechura
Puno	Unión Soratira	Azángaro
Puno	Diablos Rojos	Juliaca
San Martín	Deportivo Ucrania	Nueva Cajamarca
San Martín	Biavo	Bajo Biavo
Tacna	Bentín Tacna Heroica	Alto de la Alianza
Tacna	Patriotas	Gregorio Albarracín
Tumbes	Sport Bolognesi	Zarumilla
Tumbes	UD Tacna Libre	Casitas
Ucayali	Rauker	Callería
Ucayali	Real Von Humboldt	Padre Abad

== National Stage ==
In 2024 the National Stage has grown to 50 teams, and the new National Stage, designed by matchVision, is played under Regional using the POT System, with all the Regions of Peru represented. The National Stage starts in the second week of October.

This phase features the 50 teams that qualified from the Departmental Stage. Each team plays 3 games at home and 3 games away, for a total of 6 games against 3 different geographical rivals. The departmental stage winners only play against departmental runners-up, and vice versa. All the teams are positioned in one general table. After 6 matches, the team in places 1 to 32 are qualified directly to the Round of 32. The teams in places 33 to 50 are eliminated.

The winner and runner-up of the National Stage will be promoted to the Liga 2.

=== Tie-breaking criteria ===
The ranking of teams in the Unique Table is based on the following criteria:
1. Number of Points
2. Number of Relative Points, which are calculated by multiplying the points obtained against each rival with the total points obtained by this rival.
3. Goal difference
4. Number of goals scored
5. Better performance in away matches based on the following criteria:
1. Number of Away Points
2. Number of Away Relative Points
3. Goal Difference in away games
4. Number of goals scored in away games
6. Number of First-Half points: considering the half-time results as the final results
7. Drawing of lots

=== League table ===
Pos	Team	Pld	W	D	L	GF	GA	GD	Pts	Qualification
1	Nuevo San Cristóbal	6	5	1	0	10	5	+5	16	Round of 32
2	Defensor José María Arguedas	6	5	1	0	13	5	+8	16	Round of 32
3	Ecosem Pasco	6	4	2	0	9	2	+7	14	Round of 32
4	Cajamarca	6	5	0	1	19	6	+13	15	Round of 32
5	Unión Soratira	6	4	1	1	24	5	+19	13	Round of 32
6	Juventus	6	4	0	2	7	5	+2	12	Round of 32
7	Bentín Tacna Heroica	6	4	0	2	12	7	+5	12	Round of 32
8	Juventud Alfa	6	4	0	2	15	5	+10	12	Round of 32
9	Unión Santo Domingo	6	4	0	2	15	12	+3	12	Round of 32
10	Deportivo Ucrania	6	3	2	1	12	4	+8	11	Round of 32
11	Sport Bolognesi	6	3	2	1	8	5	+3	11	Round of 32
12	Pacífico	6	3	2	1	15	11	+4	11	Round of 32
13	Rauker	6	3	2	1	12	4	+8	11	Round of 32
14	Construcción Civil	6	3	2	1	7	3	+4	11	Round of 32
15	Diablos Rojos	6	3	1	2	12	8	+4	10	Round of 32
16	Deportivo Municipal (Pangoa)	6	3	1	2	9	8	+1	10	Round of 32
17	Viargoca	6	3	1	2	9	5	+4	10	Round of 32
18	Juventud Cautivo	6	3	1	2	13	5	+8	10	Round of 32
19	Cultural Volante	6	3	0	3	11	12	−1	9	Round of 32
20	El Inca	6	3	0	3	8	15	−7	9	Round of 32
21	UD Tacna Libre	6	3	0	3	7	7	0	9	Round of 32
22	Centro Social Pariacoto	6	3	0	3	17	14	+3	9	Round of 32
23	Deportivo Lute	6	3	0	3	10	8	+2	9	Round of 32
24	Amazon Callao	6	3	0	3	6	7	−1	9	Round of 32
25	Real San Antonio	6	2	3	1	11	9	+2	9	Round of 32
26	Sociedad Tiro 28	6	2	3	1	7	2	+5	9	Round of 32
27	Estudiantil CNI	6	3	0	3	10	4	+6	9	Round of 32
28	Nacional	6	2	2	2	8	9	−1	8	Round of 32
29	Deportivo Municipal (Vice)	6	2	2	2	6	9	−3	8	Round of 32
30	Dolce Bretaña	6	2	2	2	5	9	−4	8	Round of 32
31	Juventud Santo Domingo	6	2	2	2	3	4	−1	8	Round of 32
32	Sport Nacional	6	2	2	2	5	6	−1	8	Round of 32
33	Biavo	6	2	1	3	6	7	−1	7	
34	Alianza Arenal	6	2	1	3	3	5	−2	7	
35	Alto Rendimiento	6	2	1	3	5	14	−9	7	
36	Scratch	6	2	1	3	9	10	−1	7	
37	UDA	6	1	3	2	6	7	−1	6	
38	AFC Caychihue	6	2	0	4	14	24	−10	6	
39	Miguel Grau	6	1	2	3	7	8	−1	5	
40	Deportivo Sucre	6	1	2	3	8	11	−3	5	
41	Sport Machete	6	1	2	3	2	5	−3	5	
42	Deportivo Municipal (Tingo María)	6	1	1	4	2	14	−12	4	
43	Hijos del Altiplano y del Pacífico	6	1	1	4	5	14	−9	4	
44	Real Independiente	6	1	1	4	4	8	−4	4	
45	Unión Juventud San Martín	6	1	1	4	4	12	−8	4	
46	Señor de Quinuapata	6	1	0	5	5	10	−5	3	
47	Juventud Progreso	6	1	0	5	7	22	−15	3	
48	Patriotas	6	1	2	3	5	9	−4	2 (Note: Patriotas was docked a total of 3 points for the walkover of Round 1 against Viargoca.)	
49	Real Von Humboldt	6	0	2	4	3	12	−9	2	
50	Cajaruro	6	0	0	6	7	25	−18	0	

Updated to match(es) played on October 2024. Source:
Rules for classification: 1) points; 2) goal difference; 3) number of goals scored; 4) head-to-head record; 5) drawing of lots

=== Round 1 ===
Team 1	Score	Team 2
Estudiantil CNI	2–0	Biavo
Señor de Quinuapata	0–1	Defensor José María Arguedas
Deportivo Lute	4–1	Deportivo Municipal (Vice)
Centro Social Pariacoto	4–2	Pacífico
Cajamarca	2–0	Cajaruro
Scratch	1–3	Sport Nacional
Alto Rendimiento	1–0	Juventud Alfa
Sociedad Tiro 28	4–0	Deportivo Municipal (Tingo María)
Juventud Cautivo	2–0	UD Tacna Libre
Unión Soratira	2–1	Nacional
Rauker	3–0	Dolce Bretaña
Bentín Tacna Heroica	2–0	Hijos del Altiplano y del Pacífico
Miguel Grau	1–1	Nuevo San Cristóbal
Viargoca	3–0 (w.o.)	Patriotas
Deportivo Municipal (Pangoa)	1–1	Ecosem Pasco
UDA	2–1	Deportivo Sucre
Juventud Santo Domingo	1–0	Sport Machete
Juventus	2–0	Alianza Arenal
Real Independiente	0–1	Amazon Callao
Deportivo Ucrania	5–0	El Inca
Sport Bolognesi	2–0	Unión Juventud San Martín
Unión Santo Domingo	2–1	Cultural Volante
Construcción Civil	0–0	Real Von Humboldt
Real San Antonio	4–3	Diablos Rojos
Juventud Progreso	3–1	AFC Caychihue

=== Round 2 ===
Team 1	Score	Team 2
Nacional	2–1	Bentín Tacna Heroica
Dolce Bretaña	1–4	Deportivo Ucrania
Defensor José María Arguedas	1–0	Juventud Progreso
Amazon Callao	2–0	Juventud Santo Domingo
Sport Nacional	1–0	Señor de Quinuapata
Nuevo San Cristóbal	2–1	UDA
Unión Juventud San Martín	0–1	Cajamarca
Biavo	3–1	Unión Santo Domingo
Deportivo Municipal (Vice)	0–0	Sport Bolognesi
UD Tacna Libre	2–1	Deportivo Lute
Cajaruro	0–4	Juventud Cautivo
Cultural Volante	2–0	Juventus
Real Von Humboldt	0–1	Estudiantil CNI
Deportivo Municipal (Tingo María)	1–0	Rauker
Deportivo Sucre	0–2	Sociedad Tiro 28
Patriotas	0–0	Real San Antonio
Ecosem Pasco	2–0	Real Independiente
Pacífico	3–2	Scratch
Alianza Arenal	0–0	Construcción Civil
Sport Machete	1–2	Deportivo Municipal (Pangoa)
El Inca	3–2	Centro Social Pariacoto
Juventud Alfa	0–2	Miguel Grau
Diablos Rojos	4–0	Alto Rendimiento
AFC Caychihue	1–2	Unión Soratira
Hijos del Altiplano y del Pacífico	2–1	Viargoca

=== Round 3 ===
Team 1	Score	Team 2
Real San Antonio	4–0	Hijos del Altiplano y del Pacífico
Juventud Santo Domingo	1–1	Sport Nacional
Alto Rendimiento	1–2	AFC Caychihue
Scratch	2–1	Amazon Callao
Viargoca	0–0	Nacional
Bentín Tacna Heroica	3–0	Patriotas
Deportivo Lute	2–1	Unión Juventud San Martín
Cajamarca	5–2	Cultural Volante
Juventud Cautivo	0–0	Deportivo Municipal (Vice)
Miguel Grau	0–0	Defensor José María Arguedas
Real Independiente	1–1	Pacífico
Sociedad Tiro 28	0–1	Ecosem Pasco
Unión Santo Domingo	5–1	Cajaruro
Deportivo Ucrania	0–0	Biavo
Sport Bolognesi	1–3	UD Tacna Libre
Construcción Civil	1–0	Deportivo Municipal (Tingo María)
Estudiantil CNI	0–1	Dolce Bretaña
Juventud Progreso	0–3	Juventud Alfa
Señor de Quinuapata	1–2	Nuevo San Cristóbal
Unión Soratira	3–0	Diablos Rojos
Deportivo Municipal (Pangoa)	2–0	Deportivo Sucre
Centro Social Pariacoto	1–2	Alianza Arenal
Juventus	1–0	El Inca
UDA	0–0	Sport Machete
Rauker	1–1	Real Von Humboldt

=== Round 4 ===
Team 1	Score	Team 2
Pacífico	2–0	Real Independiente
Nacional	3–1	Viargoca
Nuevo San Cristóbal	2–1	Señor de Quinuapata
AFC Caychihue	0–1	Alto Rendimiento
Diablos Rojos	1–0	Unión Soratira
Deportivo Municipal (Tingo María)	1–3	Construcción Civil
Dolce Bretaña	1–0	Estudiantil CNI
Juventud Alfa	3–0	Juventud Progreso
Real Von Humboldt	1–2	Rauker
Deportivo Sucre	3–1	Deportivo Municipal (Pangoa)
Ecosem Pasco	0–0	Sociedad Tiro 28
Hijos del Altiplano y del Pacífico	1–1	Real San Antonio
Patriotas	3–0	Bentín Tacna Heroica
Alianza Arenal	0–1	Centro Social Pariacoto
Amazon Callao	2–1	Scratch
Biavo	0–1	Deportivo Ucrania
Cajaruro	3–4	Unión Santo Domingo
Cultural Volante	2–1	Cajamarca
Defensor José María Arguedas	3–2	Miguel Grau
El Inca	2–0	Juventus
Deportivo Municipal (Vice)	2–1	Juventud Cautivo
Sport Nacional	0–0	Juventud Santo Domingo
Sport Machete	0–0	UDA
UD Tacna Libre	0–1	Sport Bolognesi
Unión Juventud San Martín	2–0	Deportivo Lute

=== Round 5 ===
Team 1	Score	Team 2
Estudiantil CNI	6–0	Real Von Humboldt
Juventud Progreso	2–4	Defensor José María Arguedas
Real San Antonio	2–2	Patriotas
Juventud Santo Domingo	1–0	Amazon Callao
Bentín Tacna Heroica	3–0	Nacional
Scratch	1–1	Pacífico
Deportivo Lute	2–0	UD Tacna Libre
Señor de Quinuapata	2–0	Sport Nacional
Juventus	3–1	Cultural Volante
Juventud Cautivo	6–1	Cajaruro
Unión Soratira	15–0	AFC Caychihue
Construcción Civil	0–1	Alianza Arenal
Alto Rendimiento	1–1	Diablos Rojos
Deportivo Municipal (Pangoa)	2–0	Sport Machete
Centro Social Pariacoto	6–1	El Inca
Rauker	5–0	Deportivo Municipal (Tingo María)
Real Independiente	0–2	Ecosem Pasco
Deportivo Ucrania	1–1	Dolce Bretaña
UDA	0–1	Nuevo San Cristóbal
Sport Bolognesi	3–1	Deportivo Municipal (Vice)
Unión Santo Domingo	2–1	Biavo
Cajamarca	6–0	Unión Juventud San Martín
Viargoca	3–0	Hijos del Altiplano y del Pacífico
Miguel Grau	1–2	Juventud Alfa
Sociedad Tiro 28	1–1	Deportivo Sucre

=== Round 6 ===
Team 1	Score	Team 2
Ecosem Pasco	3–1	Deportivo Municipal (Pangoa)
AFC Caychihue	10–2	Juventud Progreso
Deportivo Municipal (Tingo María)	0–0	Sociedad Tiro 28
Sport Nacional	0–2	Scratch
Nuevo San Cristóbal	2–1	Miguel Grau
Nacional	2–2	Unión Soratira
Real Von Humboldt	1–2	Construcción Civil
Hijos del Altiplano y del Pacífico	2–3	Bentín Tacna Heroica
Dolce Bretaña	1–1	Rauker
Juventud Alfa	7–1	Alto Rendimiento
Diablos Rojos	3–0	Real San Antonio
Sport Machete	1–0	Juventud Santo Domingo
Deportivo Sucre	3–3	UDA
Pacífico	6–3	Centro Social Pariacoto
Deportivo Municipal (Vice)	2–1	Deportivo Lute
Patriotas	0–1	Viargoca
Amazon Callao	0–3	Real Independiente
Alianza Arenal	0–1	Juventus (Huamachuco)
UD Tacna Libre	2–0	Juventud Cautivo
Cajaruro	2–4	Cajamarca
Cultural Volante	3–1	Unión Santo Domingo
Defensor José María Arguedas	4–1	Señor de Quinuapata
Biavo	2–1	Estudiantil CNI
El Inca	2–1	Deportivo Ucrania
Unión Juventud San Martín	1–1	Sport Bolognesi

== Final Rounds ==
Round of 32
Nuevo San Cristóbal	0	3	3
Sport Nacional	1	0	1
Deportivo Municipal (Pangoa)	0	1	1
Juventud Cautivo	2	3	5
Bentín Tacna Heroica	1	1	2
Sociedad Tiro 28	1	0	1
Unión Santo Domingo	1	2	3 (3)
Amazon Callao	2	1	3 (2)
Defensor José María Arguedas	0	1	1 (2)
Juventud Santo Domingo	1	0	1 (3)
Diablos Rojos	3	0	3 (3)
Viargoca	0	3	3 (4)
Juventud Alfa	0	1	1
Real San Antonio	3	0	3
Deportivo Ucrania	0	4	4
Deportivo Lute	2	1	3
Cajamarca	1	2	3
Dolce Bretaña	1	0	1
Construcción Civil	0	1	1
Cultural Volante	1	1	2
Juventus	0	2	2 (3)
Estudiantil CNI	1	1	2 (2)
Sport Bolognesi	3	2	5 (2)
Centro Social Pariacoto	4	1	5 (3)
Ecosem Pasco	0	3	3
Deportivo Municipal (Vice)	1	0	1
Rauker	2	0	2
El Inca	3	0	3
Unión Soratira	1	0	1 (3)
Nacional	0	1	1 (4)
Pacífico	3	6	9
UD Tacna Libre	0	0	0

Round of 16
Nuevo San Cristóbal	1	2	3
Juventud Cautivo	4	0	4
Bentín Tacna Heroica	1	1	2 (3)
Unión Santo Domingo	2	0	2 (2)
Juventud Santo Domingo	2	1	3
Viargoca	0	2	2
Real San Antonio	2	0	2
Deportivo Ucrania	3	4	7
Cajamarca	1	3	4
Cultural Volante	3	0	3
Juventus	0	3	3 (4)
Centro Social Pariacoto	1	2	3 (3)
Ecosem Pasco	2	2	4
El Inca	2	1	3
Nacional	2	1	3 (4)
Pacífico	1	2	3 (3)

Quarterfinals
Juventud Cautivo	0 (3)
Bentín Tacna Heroica	0 (4)
Juventud Santo Domingo	2
Deportivo Ucrania	1
Cajamarca	2 (3)
Juventus	2 (2)
Ecosem Pasco	0
Nacional	1

Semifinals
Bentín Tacna Heroica	1 (5)
Juventud Santo Domingo	1 (4)
Cajamarca	3 (3)
Nacional	3 (2)

Champion & Runner-Up
Bentín Tacna Heroica	1 (4)
Cajamarca	1 (3)

=== Round of 32 ===
Team 1	Agg.	Team 2	1st leg	2nd leg
Sport Nacional	1–3	Nuevo San Cristóbal	1–0	0–3
Deportivo Municipal (Pangoa)	1–5	Juventud Cautivo	0–2	1–3
Real San Antonio	3–1	Juventud Alfa	3–0	0–1
Amazon Callao	3–3 (2–3 p)	Unión Santo Domingo	2–1	1–2
Juventud Santo Domingo	1–1 (3–2 p)	Defensor José María Arguedas	1–0	0–1
Diablos Rojos	3–3 (3–4 p)	Viargoca	3–0	0–3
Sociedad Tiro 28	1–2	Bentín Tacna Heroica	1–1	0–1
Deportivo Lute	3–4	Deportivo Ucrania	2–0	1–4
Dolce Bretaña	1–3	Cajamarca	1–1	0–2
Cultural Volante	2–1	Construcción Civil	1–0	1–1
Estudiantil CNI	2–2 (2–3 p)	Juventus	1–0	1–2
Centro Social Pariacoto	5–5 (5–4 p)	Sport Bolognesi	4–3	1–2
Deportivo Municipal (Vice)	1–3	Ecosem Pasco	1–0	0–3
El Inca	3–2	Rauker	3–2	0–0
Unión Soratira	1–1 (3–4 p)	Nacional	1–0	0–1
UD Tacna Libre	0–9	Pacífico	0–3	0–6

=== Round of 16 ===
Team 1	Agg.	Team 2	1st leg	2nd leg
Juventud Cautivo	4–3	Nuevo San Cristóbal	4–1	0–2
Unión Santo Domingo	2–2 (2–3 p)	Bentín Tacna Heroica	2–1	0–1
Juventud Santo Domingo	3–2	Viargoca	2–0	1–2
Real San Antonio	2–7	Deportivo Ucrania	2–3	0–4
Cultural Volante	3–4	Cajamarca	3–1	0–3
Centro Social Pariacoto	3–3 (3–4 p)	Juventus	1–0	2–3
El Inca	3–4	Ecosem Pasco	2–2	1–2
Nacional	3–3 (4–2 p)	Pacífico	2–1	1–2

=== Quarterfinals ===
14 December 2024	Juventud Cautivo	0–0 (3–4 p)	Bentín Tacna Heroica	Estadio Iván Elías Moreno
11:00				Referee: Junior Rivera
	Penalties
	Elmer Yovera (penalty scored); Gino Navarro (penalty scored); Sebastián Núñez (penalty missed); Brayan Córdova (penalty missed); Owen Farfán (penalty scored); Felipe Mesones (penalty missed)		Bryan Molina (penalty scored); Allonso Dávila (penalty missed); Carlos Huaraca (penalty missed); Eduardo Chávez (penalty scored); Josmar Murillo (penalty scored); John Fajardo (penalty scored)

14 December 2024	Juventud Santo Domingo	2–1	Deportivo Ucrania	Estadio Iván Elías Moreno
15:00	Crisanto Palacios 47'; Ricardo Morán 71'		Dennis Vásquez 86'	Referee: Jordi Espinoza

15 December 2024	Cajamarca	2–2 (3–2 p)	Juventus	Estadio Iván Elías Moreno
11:00	Josimar Serrato 44'; Wilmer Aguirre 53'		Carlos Ruiz 27'; Kléiber Palomino 50'	Referee: Luis Ciriaco
	Penalties
	Jossimar Serrato (penalty missed); Brucelee Micha (penalty missed); Hairo Timaná (penalty scored); Adrián Mujica (penalty scored); Wilmer Aguirre (penalty scored)		Henry Santisteban (penalty scored); Guillermo Vernal (penalty missed); Kléiber Palomino (penalty scored); José Zurita (penalty missed); Franco Aguirre (penalty missed)

15 December 2024	Ecosem Pasco	0–1	Nacional	Estadio Iván Elías Moreno
15:00			Jean Pierre Valdivia 82'	Referee: Micke Palomino

=== Semifinals ===
18 December 2024	Bentín Tacna Heroica	1–1 (5–4 p)	Juventud Santo Domingo	Estadio Iván Elías Moreno
11:00	Claudio García 13'		Alberto Vela 90+1'	Referee: Micke Palomino
	Penalties
	Kevin Laura (penalty scored); Josmar Murillo (penalty scored); Jhoel Montalvo (penalty scored); Ramiro Benavente (penalty scored); Walter Vásquez (penalty scored)		Crisanto Palacios (penalty scored); Luis Pizuri (penalty scored); Luis A. Galliquio (penalty missed); Luis Chávez (penalty scored); Alberto Vela (penalty scored)

18 December 2024	Cajamarca	3–3 (3–2 p)	Nacional	Estadio Iván Elías Moreno
15:00	Jossimar Serrato 45+3' (pen.); Adrián Mujica 52' 69'		Jean Valdivia 18'; Joaquín Astorga 20'; Eduardo Torres 90'	Referee: Fernando Legario
	Penalties
	Jossimar Serrato (penalty scored); Carlos Canales (penalty missed); Hairo Timaná (penalty scored); Ramsés Ñontol (penalty scored)		Luis Pastor (penalty scored); Gustavo Torres (penalty missed); Jean Pierre Valdivia (penalty missed); Andy Polar (penalty scored); Brayan Castillo (penalty missed)

=== Final ===
22 December 2024	Bentín Tacna Heroica	1–1 (4–3 p)	Cajamarca	Estadio Iván Elías Moreno
14:00	Jhoel Montalvo 90+4'		Jossimar Serrato 26'	Referee: Jordi Espinoza
	Penalties
	Kevin Laura (penalty scored); Eduardo Chávez (penalty scored); Jhoel Montalvo (penalty scored); Ramiro Benavente (penalty missed); Walter Vásquez (penalty scored)		Josimar Serrato (penalty missed); Hairo Timaná (penalty scored); Carlos Canales (penalty scored); Maelo Reátegui (penalty missed); Wilmer Cabanillas (penalty scored)

== Aggregate table ==
Pos	Team	Pld	W	D	L	GF	GA	GD	Pts	Qualification
1	Bentín Tacna Heroica (C)	13	6	4	3	18	12	+6	22	2025 Liga 2
2	Cajamarca	13	7	4	2	32	16	+16	25	2025 Liga 2
3	Juventud Santo Domingo	12	5	3	4	10	9	+1	18	2025 Liga 3
4	Nacional	12	5	3	4	16	16	0	18	2025 Liga 3
5	Ecosem Pasco	11	6	3	2	16	7	+9	21	2025 Liga 3
6	Deportivo Ucrania	11	6	2	3	24	11	+13	20	2025 Liga 3
7	Juventud Cautivo	11	6	2	3	22	9	+13	20	2025 Liga 3
8	Juventus	11	6	1	4	14	12	+2	19	2025 Liga 3
9	Nuevo San Cristóbal	10	7	1	2	16	10	+6	22	2025 Liga 3
10	Pacífico	10	6	2	2	27	14	+13	20	2025 Liga 3
11	Unión Santo Domingo	10	6	0	4	20	17	+3	18	2025 Liga 3
12	Viargoca	10	5	1	4	14	11	+3	16	Ligas Distritales
13	Cultural Volante	10	5	1	4	16	17	−1	16	2025 Liga 3
14	Centro Social Pariacoto	10	5	0	5	25	22	+3	15	2025 Liga 3
15	El Inca	10	4	2	4	14	21	−7	14	Ligas Distritales
16	Real San Antonio	10	3	3	4	16	17	−1	12	2025 Liga 3
17	Defensor José María Arguedas	8	6	1	1	14	6	+8	19	2025 Liga 3
18	Unión Soratira	8	5	1	2	25	6	+19	16	Ligas Distritales
19	Juventud Alfa	8	5	0	3	16	8	+8	15	2025 Liga 3
20	Sport Bolognesi	8	4	2	2	13	10	+3	14	2025 Liga 3
21	Diablos Rojos	8	4	1	3	15	11	+4	13	2025 Liga 3
22	Rauker	8	3	3	2	14	7	+7	12	2025 Liga 3
23	Estudiantil CNI	8	4	0	4	12	6	+6	12	2025 Liga 3
24	Construcción Civil	8	3	3	2	8	5	+3	12	2025 Liga 3
25	Deportivo Lute	8	4	0	4	13	12	+1	12	2025 Liga 3
26	Amazon Callao	8	4	0	4	9	10	−1	12	2025 Liga 3
27	Sport Nacional	8	3	2	3	6	9	−3	11	Ligas Distritales
28	Deportivo Municipal (Vice)	8	3	2	3	7	12	−5	11	Ligas Distritales
29	Sociedad Tiro 28	8	2	4	2	8	4	+4	10	Ligas Distritales
30	Deportivo Municipal (Pangoa)	8	3	1	4	10	13	−3	10	2025 Liga 3
31	Dolce Bretaña	8	2	3	3	6	12	−6	9	Ligas Distritales
32	UD Tacna Libre	8	3	0	5	7	16	−9	9	Ligas Distritales
33	Scratch	6	2	1	3	9	10	−1	7	Ligas Distritales
34	Biavo	6	2	1	3	6	7	−1	7	Ligas Distritales
35	Alianza Arenal	6	2	1	3	3	5	−2	7	Ligas Distritales
36	Alto Rendimiento	6	2	1	3	5	14	−9	7	2025 Liga 3
37	UDA	6	1	3	2	6	7	−1	6	2025 Liga 3
38	AFC Caychihue	6	2	0	4	14	24	−10	6	Ligas Distritales
39	Miguel Grau	6	1	2	3	7	8	−1	5	Ligas Distritales
40	Deportivo Sucre	6	1	2	3	8	11	−3	5	Ligas Distritales
41	Sport Machete	6	1	2	3	2	5	−3	5	Ligas Distritales
42	Deportivo Municipal (Tingo María)	6	1	1	4	2	14	−12	4	Ligas Distritales
43	Hijos del Altiplano y del Pacífico	6	1	1	4	5	14	−9	4	Ligas Distritales
44	Real Independiente	6	1	1	4	4	8	−4	4	Ligas Distritales
45	Unión Juventud San Martín	6	1	1	4	4	12	−8	4	Ligas Distritales
46	Señor de Quinuapata	6	1	0	5	5	10	−5	3	Ligas Distritales
47	Juventud Progreso	6	1	0	5	7	22	−15	3	Ligas Distritales
48	Patriotas	6	1	2	3	5	9	−4	2 (Note: Patriotas was docked a total of 3 points for the walkover of Round 1 against Viargoca.)	2025 Liga 3
49	Real Von Humboldt	6	0	2	4	3	12	−9	2	Ligas Distritales
50	Cajaruro	6	0	0	6	7	25	−18	0	Ligas Distritales

Updated to match(es) played on October 2024. Source:
Rules for classification: 1) points; 2) goal difference; 3) number of goals scored; 4) head-to-head record; 5) drawing of lots
(C) Champions

== Top goalscorers ==
Rank	Name	Club	Goals
1	(Peru) Jossimar Serrato	Cajamarca	12
2	(Peru) Kevin Laura	Bentín Tacna Heroica	9
3	(Peru) José Rojas	Centro Social Pariacoto	8
3	(Peru) Kevin Carazas	Pacífico	8

== See also ==
- 2024 Liga 1
- 2024 Liga 2
- 2024 Ligas Departamentales del Perú
