= 2024 Ligas Departamentales del Perú =

Ligas Departamentales del Peru
- Season: 2024

The 2024 Ligas Departamentales, the fifth division of Peruvian football, were played by variable number teams by Departament. The champions and runners-up of each department qualified for the national stage of the 2024 Copa Perú.

== Liga Departamental de Amazonas ==
=== First stage ===
Team 1	Agg.	Team 2	1st leg	2nd leg
Unión Bagua	5–1	Invencibles Candungos	4–0	1–1
Unión Awajún	4–12	Cajaruro FC	4–6	0–6
Unión Juventud	6–3	AFC Técnico Industrial	4–2	2–1
Sport Karajía	2–7	Deportivo Municipal (Jazán)	2–2	0–5
Unión Comercial	2–2 (2–4 p)	San Juan de Luya	0–1	2–1
Deportivo Amazonas	1–12	Amazonas FC	0–4	1–8
Unión Santo Domingo	3–0	Defensor Mariscal Benavides	2–0	1–0

=== Quarterfinals ===
Team 1	Agg.	Team 2	1st leg	2nd leg
Cajaruro FC	7–5	Unión Bagua	4–4	3–1
Invencibles Candungos	3–4	Unión Juventud	3–1	0–3
San Juan de Luya	0–2	Deportivo Municipal (Jazán)	0–1	0–1
Unión Santo Domingo	3–3 (5–4 p)	Amazonas FC	1–1	2–2

=== Semifinals ===
Team 1	Agg.	Team 2	1st leg	2nd leg
Unión Juventud	2–4	Cajaruro FC	1–0	1–4
Unión Santo Domingo	8–1	Deportivo Municipal (Jazán)	7–0	1–1

=== Finals ===
Team 1	Agg.	Team 2	1st leg	2nd leg
Cajaruro FC	5–6	Unión Santo Domingo	3–1	2–5

== Liga Departamental de Áncash ==
=== First stage ===
Team 1	Agg.	Team 2	1st leg	2nd leg
Caballeros de La Ley	7–0	Juventud Shiqui	2–0	5–0
José Gálvez Chimbote	1–0	Transportes Pablito	1–0	0–0
River Santa	4–4 (6–5 p)	Defensor Huarmey	2–2	2–2
Virgen de Asunción	0–6	Sport Ayash Huamanin	0–2	0–4
FC Yacupampa	0–11	Sport Áncash	0–1	0–10
Geronimus College	3–2	Augusto B. Leguia	3–0	0–2
Virgen de Guadalupe	2–4	Virgen del Rosario	2–3	0–1
La Perla Negra	1–7	Atlético Huari	1–4	0–3
Urb. Santa Gertrudis	5–5 (5–6 p)	Sport Áncash de Liza	2–3	3–2
Alianza Arenal	8–0	Colegio San Roque	5–0	3–0
San Andrés de Runtu	12–0	Señor de los Milagros	8–0	4–0
Sport Huaquilla	9–2	Deportivo Municipal (Huallanca)	6–0	3–2
Líder Andino	3–7	Ramón Castilla	2–1	1–6
Atlético Bruces	7–2	HDC Mancos	4–0	3–2
Estrella Roja	3–1	Nueva Generación	2–0	1–1
Deportivo Bolívar	1–5	Centro Social Pariacoto	1–3	0–2

=== Round of 16 ===
Team 1	Agg.	Team 2	1st leg	2nd leg
Caballeros de La Ley	2–3	José Gálvez Chimbote	2–1	0–2
River Santa	1–4	Sport Ayash Huamanin	1–1	0–3
Sport Áncash	9–2	Geronimus College	7–0	2–2
Virgen del Rosario	1–6	Atlético Huari	1–2	0–4
Alianza Arenal	4–1	Sport Áncash de Liza	2–1	2–0
Sport Huaquilla	0–14	San Andrés de Runtu	0–2	0–12
Ramón Castilla	4–4 (4–2 p)	Atlético Bruces	4–3	0–1
Estrella Roja	3–8	Centro Social Pariacoto	1–4	2–4

=== Quarterfinals ===
Team 1	Agg.	Team 2	1st leg	2nd leg
José Gálvez Chimbote	5–5 (7–8 p)	Sport Ayash Huamanin	2–3	3–2
Sport Áncash	0–0 (3–4 p)	Atlético Huari	0–0	0–0
Alianza Arenal	2–1	San Andrés de Runtu	2–0	0–1
Ramón Castilla	0–14	Centro Social Pariacoto	0–5	0–9

=== Liguilla Final ===
Pos	Team	Pld	W	D	L	GF	GA	GD	Pts	Qualification or relegation	PAR	ALI	HUA	AYA
1	Centro Social Pariacoto	5	4	1	0	10	3	+7	13	Advance to 2024 Copa Perú		1–0	2–1	2–1
2	Alianza Arenal	5	2	1	2	8	7	+1	7	Advance to 2024 Copa Perú	2–2		2–1	
3	Atlético Huari	5	2	0	3	8	10	−2	6			2–4		2–1
4	Sport Ayash Huamanin	5	1	0	4	3	9	−6	3		0–3	1–0	1–2	

Legend: Blue = home team win; Yellow = draw; Red = away team win.
Rules for classification: 1) Points; 2) Goal difference; 3) Goals for; 4) Fair play points; 5) Drawing of lots.

== Liga Departamental de Apurímac ==
=== First stage ===
Team 1	Agg.	Team 2	1st leg	2nd leg
Miguel Grau	2–0	Halcones de El Oro	2–0	0–0
Estrella de Totora	3–5	Cultural Huancarama	1–1	2–4
San Nicolás Tolentino	1–5	Unión Minas Pamputa	1–0	0–5
Echa Muni	3–2	Cultural El Grauino	2–0	1–2
Defensor Huayunca	1–2	Florida	1–1	0–1
Deportivo Ocobamba	0–2	Social Huasapampa	0–2	0–0

=== Quarterfinals ===
Team 1	Agg.	Team 2	1st leg	2nd leg
Miguel Grau	3–1	Unión Minas Pamputa	3–0	0–1
Echa Muni	5–9	Cultural Huancarama	4–5	1–4
Social Huasapampa	1–2	Instituto Apurímac	1–1	0–1
Defensor José María Arguedas	2–2 (2–4 p)	Florida	1–1	1–1

=== Semifinals ===
Team 1	Agg.	Team 2	1st leg	2nd leg
Miguel Grau	1–1 (8–7 p)	Instituto Apurímac	0–0	1–1
Florida	2–1	Cultural Huancarama	1–0	1–1

=== Finals ===
Team 1	Agg.	Team 2	1st leg	2nd leg
Florida*	1–3	Miguel Grau	0–1	1–2

- Florida was disqualified for non-compliance with Official Letter No. 002.

=== Second place playoff ===
Team 1	Agg.	Team 2	1st leg	2nd leg
Defensor José María Arguedas	3–0	Cultural Huancarama	2–0	1–0

== Liga Departamental de Arequipa ==
=== First stage ===
Team 1	Agg.	Team 2	1st leg	2nd leg
Buenos Aires	3–8	Aurora	2–3	1–5
Atlético Universidad	5–5	Nacional	0–1	4–4
Deportivo Copacabana	3–6	Deportivo Estrella	2–1	1–5
Deportivo Colón	3–4	Virgen de las Nieves	2–2	1–2
Deportivo Majes	5–7	Viargoca	4–5	1–2
Sport Perú	1–7	Racing Colca	1–2	0–5
Deportivo Chinitos	6–4	Espiga Dorada	5–2	1–2

=== Quarterfinals ===
Team 1	Agg.	Team 2	1st leg	2nd leg
Deportivo Estrella	3–3 (3–4 p)	Racing Colca	3–1	0–2
Virgen de las Nieves	0–3	Aurora	0–1	0–2
Deportivo Chinitos	4–5	Viargoca	2–2	2–3
Espiga Dorada	0–6	Nacional	0–1	0–5

=== Liguilla Final ===
Pos	Team	Pld	W	D	L	GF	GA	GD	Pts	Qualification or relegation	VIA	NAC	AUR	RAC
1	Viargoca	6	5	1	0	18	7	+11	16	Advance to 2024 Copa Perú		4–2	2–1	4–0
2	Nacional	6	3	0	3	15	12	+3	9	Advance to 2024 Copa Perú	2–3		5–3	3–0
3	Aurora	6	3	0	3	11	13	−2	9		1–4	1–0		3–1
4	Racing Colca	6	0	1	5	4	16	−12	1		1–1	1–3	1–2	

Legend: Blue = home team win; Yellow = draw; Red = away team win.
Rules for classification: 1) Points; 2) Goal difference; 3) Goals for; 4) Fair play points; 5) Drawing of lots.

==== Second place playoff ====
Team 1	Score	Team 2
Nacional	2–0	Aurora

== Liga Departamental de Ayacucho ==
=== First stage ===
Team 1	Agg.	Team 2	1st leg	2nd leg
Player Villafuerte	3–1	Juventud Miraflores	3–1	0–0
Nuevo San Cristóbal	3–1	Defensor Patibamba	3–1	0–0
Valle Ninabamba	2–8	Deportivo Municipal (Catarata)	1–2	1–6
Señor de Quinuapata	11–0	Virgen de Candelaria	6–0	5–0
FC San Antonio	0–16	Atlético Huamanga	0–13	0–3
Juventudes Alvaro	1–5	Los Pampinos	1–2	0–3
Centro Unión Chilcayocc	2–2	Deportivo Municipal (Huancaraylla)	2–1	0–1
Deportivo Municipal (Concepción)	0–0	Defensor Yuraccyacu	0–0	0–0
Sport Ochoa	3–1	Los Audaces de Vilcas Huamán	2–0	1–1
Unión Churcampa	0–4	Cultural Huracán	0–1	0–3

=== Round of 16 ===
Team 1	Agg.	Team 2	1st leg	2nd leg
Sport Cáceres	2–3	Defensor Patibamba	1–2	1–1
Atlético Huamanga	2–1	Los Audaces de Vilcas Huamán	1–1	1–0
Juventud Miraflores	2–8	Señor de Quinuapata	1–3	1–5
Deportivo Municipal (Concepción)	2–3	Deportivo Municipal (Catarata)	2–3	0–0
Los Pampinos	1–6	Defensor Yuraccyacu	0–1	1–5
Cultural Huracán	8–1	Centro Unión Chilcayocc	5–1	3–0
Deportivo Municipal (Huancaraylla)	1–10	Player Villafuerte	1–2	0–8
Nuevo San Cristóbal	4–3	Sport Ochoa	2–2	2–1

=== Quarterfinals ===
Team 1	Agg.	Team 2	1st leg	2nd leg
Defensor Patibamba	2–2 (3–4 p)	Nuevo San Cristóbal	2–1	0–1
Defensor Yuraccyacu	0–3	Deportivo Municipal (Catarata)	0–1	0–2
Atlético Huamanga	1–3	Player Villafuerte	1–1	0–2
Cultural Huracán	2–2 (4–5 p)	Señor de Quinuapata	1–1	1–1

=== Semifinals ===
Team 1	Agg.	Team 2	1st leg	2nd leg
Nuevo San Cristóbal	1–1 (5–4 p)	Deportivo Municipal (Catarata)	1–0	0–1
Player Villafuerte	2–4	Señor de Quinuapata	1–1	1–3

=== Final ===
Team 1	Score	Team 2
Señor de Quinuapata	1–0	Nuevo San Cristóbal

== Liga Departamental de Cajamarca ==
=== First stage ===
Team 1	Agg.	Team 2	1st leg	2nd leg
Señor de los Milagros (Celendín)	0–2	Cajamarca	0–0	0–2
Deportivo Chala	2–2 (4–5 p)	Deportivo Chota	0–0	2–2
Cultural Chota	2–3	Cultural Volante	1–2	1–1
Defensor Cruceño	2–2 (5–6 p)	ACD Urcurume	2–1	0–1
Estrella Roja	3–2	Señor de los Milagros (Jaén)	2–1	1–1
Zamudio	4–4 (4–3 p)	Santiago Apóstol	3–3	1–1
Virgen de la Natividad	1–3	Independiente JPM	1–1	0–2
Jorge Basadre	1–5	Unión Huayobamba	0–1	1–4
Deportivo Rodiopampa	4–3	Familia Verástegui	3–2	1–1
Sport Rayo	2–16	ADA Cajabamba	1–6	1–10
Colonia Tongodina	1–2	Sánchez Carrión	1–1	0–1
Ramón Castilla (San Pablo)	2–5	Pisadiablos	2–0	0–5

=== Second stage ===
Team 1	Agg.	Team 2	1st leg	2nd leg
Deportivo Chota	3–4	Cajamarca	3–1	0–3
Cultural Volante	3–3 (3–1 p)	Sport El Milagro	2–0	1–3
ACD Urcurume	4–3	Estrella Roja	2–0	2–3
Zamudio	3–3 (4–2 p)	Independiente JPM	2–1	1–2
Familia Verástegui	3–3 (4–5 p)	Unión Huayobamba	3–1	0–2
Colonia Tongodina	1–7	ADA Cajabamba	1–2	0–5
Defensor Cruceño	2–2 (4–1 p)	Pisadiablos	1–0	1–2

=== Quarterfinals ===
Team 1	Agg.	Team 2	1st leg	2nd leg
Sport El Milagro	3–3 (5–3 p)	ADA Cajabamba	1–0	2–3
ACD Urcurume	0–4	Cajamarca	0–1	0–3
Independiente JPM	0–4	Cultural Volante	0–0	0–4
Unión Huayobamba	7–5	Pisadiablos	5–0	2–5

=== Semifinals ===
Team 1	Agg.	Team 2	1st leg	2nd leg
Unión Huayobamba	0–3	Cajamarca	0–0	0–3
ADA Cajabamba	6–5	Cultural Volante	6–4	0–1*
Sport El Milagro	1–5	Cultural Volante	1–1	0–4

- The ADA Cajabamba/Cultural Volante match was suspended due to incidents, as a result ADA Cajabamba was eliminated.

== Liga Departamental del Callao ==
=== Group stage ===
==== Group A ====
Pos	Team	Pld	W	D	L	GF	GA	GD	Pts	Qualification or relegation	CAL	DEF	POR	AEB	PAL	RC8	SAB
1	Amazon Callao	6	5	1	0	15	7	+8	16	Advance to 2024 Copa Perú				2–2	1–0	3–2	6–2
2	Defensor Todos Unidos	5	4	0	1	10	7	+3	12		0–1		3–2		2–1	2–1	
3	Atlético Porteño	5	3	0	2	10	7	+3	9		1–2				2–1		
4	AEB	5	1	1	3	8	10	−2	4			2–3					
5	Juventud Palmeiras	5	1	0	4	7	7	0	3					0–2			
6	Academia RC8	4	1	0	3	6	9	−3	3				0–3	3–1			
7	Full Sábado	4	1	0	3	5	14	−9	3				1–2	2–1	0–5		

Legend: Blue = home team win; Yellow = draw; Red = away team win.
Rules for classification: 1) Points; 2) Goal difference; 3) Goals for; 4) Fair play points; 5) Drawing of lots.

==== Group B ====
Pos	Team	Pld	W	D	L	GF	GA	GD	Pts	Qualification or relegation	SCR	POR	CHA	C23	EST	PEÑ	ASU
1	Scratch FC	6	5	1	0	27	3	+24	16	Advance to 2024 Copa Perú			2–2	5–1			12–0
2	Calidad Porteña	6	5	0	1	13	5	+8	15		0–2		2–1	3–2	1–0	2–0	5–0
3	Chalaca FC	5	2	2	1	11	4	+7	8						0–0	6–0	
4	Calle 23	5	2	0	3	7	10	−3	6				0–2		1–0		3–0
5	Estrella Roja Santa Cruz	5	1	1	3	2	6	−4	4		0–3						
6	Cultural Peñarol	5	1	0	4	8	15	−7	3		0–3				1–2		
7	Atlético Sullana	4	0	0	4	2	27	−25	0							2–7	

Legend: Blue = home team win; Yellow = draw; Red = away team win.
Rules for classification: 1) Points; 2) Goal difference; 3) Goals for; 4) Fair play points; 5) Drawing of lots.

=== Final ===
Team 1	Score	Team 2
Amazon Callao	1–1 (2–4 p)	Scratch

== Liga Departamental de Cusco ==
=== Group Stage ===
==== Group A ====
Pos	Team	Pld	W	D	L	GF	GA	GD	Pts	AJI	EST	AMI	OLI
1	AJI	6	4	1	1	20	6	+14	13		2–2	2–1	10–0
2	Estrellas Chilca	6	3	2	1	15	7	+8	11	3–1		1–1	5–0
3	Amigos de Garci	6	3	1	2	9	8	+1	10	0–3	1–0		4–1
4	Olímpicos de Maska	6	0	0	6	4	27	−23	0	0–2	2–4	1–2	

Legend: Blue = home team win; Yellow = draw; Red = away team win.
Rules for classification: 1) Points; 2) Goal difference; 3) Goals for; 4) Fair play points; 5) Drawing of lots.

==== Group B ====
Pos	Team	Pld	W	D	L	GF	GA	GD	Pts	AGR	MAR	JUV	CIR
1	Agropecuario	6	4	1	1	14	3	+11	13		3–1	5–0	2–1
2	Virgen María de la O	6	3	2	1	10	6	+4	11	1–1		3–1	1–1
3	Juventud Patria	6	2	0	4	6	15	−9	6	1–3	0–3		2–0
4	Circa Kcacya	6	1	1	4	4	8	−4	4	1–0	0–1	1–2	

Legend: Blue = home team win; Yellow = draw; Red = away team win.
Rules for classification: 1) Points; 2) Goal difference; 3) Goals for; 4) Fair play points; 5) Drawing of lots.

==== Group C ====
Pos	Team	Pld	W	D	L	GF	GA	GD	Pts	QUI	MUN	PRO	DEF
1	Juventus Quiquijana	6	4	0	2	5	6	−1	12		2–1	1–0	1–0
2	Deportivo Municipal (Megantoni)	6	3	2	1	10	5	+5	11	2–0		4–2	1–0
3	Juventud Progreso	6	2	1	3	9	9	0	7	3–0	1–1		1–3
4	Defensor K'Ana	6	1	1	4	4	8	−4	4	0–1	1–1	0–3	

Legend: Blue = home team win; Yellow = draw; Red = away team win.
Rules for classification: 1) Points; 2) Goal difference; 3) Goals for; 4) Fair play points; 5) Drawing of lots.

==== Group D ====
Pos	Team	Pld	W	D	L	GF	GA	GD	Pts	KIA	DEF	LID	ONC
1	Kiara Romina	6	4	1	1	19	4	+15	13		6–1	2–1	10–1
2	Defensor Sondorf	6	4	0	2	10	12	−2	12	1–0		1–3	1–0
3	Líder Ollanta	6	3	1	2	14	6	+8	10	0–0	0–1		7–1
4	Once Estrellas	6	0	0	6	6	27	−21	0	0–1	2–4	1–3	

Legend: Blue = home team win; Yellow = draw; Red = away team win.
Rules for classification: 1) Points; 2) Goal difference; 3) Goals for; 4) Fair play points; 5) Drawing of lots.

==== Group E ====
Pos	Team	Pld	W	D	L	GF	GA	GD	Pts	JES	NUE	ATL	STA
1	Jesuscelense	6	4	1	1	12	6	+6	13		3–1	3–1	0–0
2	Nuevo Amanecer	6	4	1	1	10	4	+6	13	2–1		0–0	5–0
3	Atlético Quisini	6	1	2	3	6	8	−2	5	1–2	0–1		2–0
4	Star Power	6	0	2	4	3	13	−10	2	1–3	0–1	2–2	

Legend: Blue = home team win; Yellow = draw; Red = away team win.
Rules for classification: 1) Points; 2) Goal difference; 3) Goals for; 4) Fair play points; 5) Drawing of lots.

===== Tiebreaker =====
Team 1	Score	Team 2
Nuevo Amanecer	0–0 (4–3 p)	Jesuscelense

==== Group F ====
Pos	Team	Pld	W	D	L	GF	GA	GD	Pts	MUN	ALF	UNI	HUR
1	Real Municipal (Coporaque)	6	4	1	1	13	5	+8	13		0–1	5–0	1–0
2	Juventud Alfa	6	4	1	1	13	5	+8	13	0–0		5–1	3–1
3	Unión Cóndor	6	3	0	3	8	12	−4	9	0–1	2–1		4–0
4	Huracán de Tihuicty	6	0	0	6	2	15	−13	0	0–3	1–3	0–2	

Legend: Blue = home team win; Yellow = draw; Red = away team win.
Rules for classification: 1) Points; 2) Goal difference; 3) Goals for; 4) Fair play points; 5) Drawing of lots.

===== Tiebreaker =====
Team 1	Score	Team 2
Juventud Alfa	1–1 (6–5 p)	Real Municipal (Coporaque)

=== Quarterfinals ===
Team 1	Agg.	Team 2	1st leg	2nd leg
Agropecuario	2–8	AJI	1–2	1–6
Racing (Ccayocca)	canceled	Juventus Quiquijana	—	—
Kiara Romina	canceled	Nuevo Amanecer	—	—
Defensor Sangarará	canceled	Juventud Alfa	—	—

=== Semifinals ===
Team 1	Agg.	Team 2	1st leg	2nd leg
AJI*	6–0	Juventud Progreso	3–0	3–0
Nuevo Amanecer	0–2	Juventud Alfa	0–1	0–1

- AJI was disqualified for non-compliance with Official Letter No. 002.

== Liga Departamental de Huancavelica ==
=== First stage ===
Team 1	Agg.	Team 2	1st leg	2nd leg
UDA	4–1	Real Sociedad (Huaytará)	1–1	3–0
Sport Huáscar	2–4	UD Calvario	1–3	1–1
Sport Machete	2–1	Defensor Bellavista	1–0	1–1
ADHES Paucará	0–0	FIMCA UNH	0–0	0–0

==== Tiebreaker ====
Team 1	Score	Team 2
ADHES Paucará	0–1	FIMCA UNH

=== Liguilla Final ===
Pos	Team	Pld	W	D	L	GF	GA	GD	Pts	Qualification or relegation	MAC	UDA	CAL	UNH
1	Sport Machete	6	3	3	0	8	4	+4	12	Advance to 2024 Copa Perú		0–0	2–1	1–1
2	UDA	6	2	3	1	6	1	+5	9	Advance to 2024 Copa Perú	0–1		0–0	3–0
3	UD Calvario	6	2	3	1	10	5	+5	9		2–2	0–0		4–0
4	FIMCA UNH	6	0	1	5	2	16	−14	1		0–2	0–3	1–3	

Legend: Blue = home team win; Yellow = draw; Red = away team win.
Rules for classification: 1) Points; 2) Goal difference; 3) Goals for; 4) Fair play points; 5) Drawing of lots.

== Liga Departamental de Huánuco ==
=== First stage ===
Team 1	Agg.	Team 2	1st leg	2nd leg
Tingo Chico	6–3	Real Espino	3–1	3–2
Juana Moreno	0–4	San José (Huacaybamba)	0–1	0–3
Independiente (Tocache)	3–4	Juventud Topa	2–1	1–3
Real Ambo	1–1 (5–4 p)	Once Leones	0–0	1–1
León de Huánuco FC	9–4	Marañón FC	6–1	3–3
San Miguel (Huacaybamba)	2–3	Deportivo Pujay	2–0	0–3
Deportivo Municipal (Tingo María)	3–2	Juventud Santa Rosa	2–2	1–0
Social Diamante	2–10	Juventud La Palma (Tocache)	1–6	1–4
Social Molinos	2–1	Deportivo Municipal (Chacos)	2–0	0–1
Atlético Cochapampa	1–1 (3–5 p)	Construcción Civil	0–0	1–1

=== Second stage ===
Team 1	Agg.	Team 2	1st leg	2nd leg
Tingo Chico	1–10	Construcción Civil	1–1	0–10
Juventud Topa	2–3	Social Molinos	2–0	0–3
San José (Huacaybamba)	3–3 (6–7 p)	Deportivo Municipal (Tingo María)	2–1	1–2
Deportivo Pujay	0–3	Juventud La Palma (Tocache)	0–0	0–3
Real Ambo	2–2 (4–2 p)	León de Huánuco FC	2–1	0–1

=== Third stage ===
Team 1	Agg.	Team 2	1st leg	2nd leg
Social Molinos	1–5	Juventud La Palma (Tocache)	1–2	0–3
Construcción Civil	4–0	Real Ambo	3–0	1–0

=== Repechaje ===
Team 1	Score	Team 2
Juventud La Palma (Tocache)	0–1	Deportivo Municipal (Tingo María)

=== Finals ===
Team 1	Agg.	Team 2	1st leg	2nd leg
Deportivo Municipal (Tingo María)	1–1 (1–4 p)	Construcción Civil	0–0	1–1

== Liga Departamental de Ica ==
=== First stage ===
Team 1	Agg.	Team 2	1st leg	2nd leg
2 de Mayo	0–3	Sport Nacional	0–1	0–2
Asociación Cultural	4–0	Santa Rosa de Palpa	4–0	0–0
América de Palpa	4–4 (4–2 p)	Lolo Fernández	1–2	3–2
Atlético Nacional	1–1 (3–5 p)	Juventus Santa Cruz	1–0	0–1
José María Arguedas	1–2	Juan XXIII	1–0	0–2
Alianza Pisco	2–3	Juventud Santo Domingo	0–0	2–3

=== Quarterfinals ===
Team 1	Agg.	Team 2	1st leg	2nd leg
Asociación Cultural	0–2	Sport Nacional	0–0	0–2
Lolo Fernández	3–1	Juan XXIII	3–1	0–0
Atlético Nacional	3–1	América de Palpa	2–1	1–0
Juventud Santa Cruz	0–1	Juventud Santo Domingo	0–0	0–1

=== Semifinals ===
Team 1	Agg.	Team 2	1st leg	2nd leg
Lolo Fernández	1–2	Sport Nacional	1–2	0–0
Atlético Nacional	1–2	Juventud Santo Domingo	0–2	1–0

=== Final ===
Team 1	Score	Team 2
Juventud Santo Domingo	1–0	Sport Nacional

== Liga Departamental de Junín ==
=== First Stage ===
==== Group A ====
Pos	Team	Pld	W	D	L	GF	GA	GD	Pts	WAN	DEF	FER	MUN
1	Atlético Wanka	3	2	1	0	6	1	+5	7				3–1
2	Defensor Municipal (Perené)	3	1	2	0	1	0	+1	5	0–0		1–0	
3	Ferretería Meza	3	1	0	2	2	5	−3	3	0–3			2–1
4	Deportivo Municipal (Huayre)	3	0	1	2	2	5	−3	1		0–0		

Legend: Blue = home team win; Yellow = draw; Red = away team win.
Rules for classification: 1) Points; 2) Goal difference; 3) Goals for; 4) Fair play points; 5) Drawing of lots.

==== Group B ====
Pos	Team	Pld	W	D	L	GF	GA	GD	Pts	MPA	LOL	PRO	MAP
1	Deportivo Municipal (Pangoa)	3	3	0	0	7	0	+7	9		1–0		5–0
2	Echa Lolo	3	1	1	1	2	1	+1	4			2–0	
3	Progreso (Tayacaja)	3	1	0	2	3	5	−2	3	0–1			3–2
4	Deportivo Municipal (Apan)	3	0	1	2	2	8	−6	1		0–0		

Legend: Blue = home team win; Yellow = draw; Red = away team win.
Rules for classification: 1) Points; 2) Goal difference; 3) Goals for; 4) Fair play points; 5) Drawing of lots.

===== Tiebreaker =====
Team 1	Score	Team 2
Deportivo Municipal (Huayre)	1–1 (4–1 p)	Deportivo Municipal (Apan)

==== Group C ====
Pos	Team	Pld	W	D	L	GF	GA	GD	Pts	COR	ALI	PRO	MIR
1	Defensor Cormis	3	3	0	0	7	1	+6	9		3–0		
2	Alipio Ponce	3	2	0	1	7	4	+3	6			2–1	5–0
3	Progreso Muruhuay	3	1	0	2	2	3	−1	3	0–1			1–0
4	AD Miraflores	3	0	0	3	1	9	−8	0	1–3			

Legend: Blue = home team win; Yellow = draw; Red = away team win.
Rules for classification: 1) Points; 2) Goal difference; 3) Goals for; 4) Fair play points; 5) Drawing of lots.

==== Group D ====
Pos	Team	Pld	W	D	L	GF	GA	GD	Pts	SAC	MUN	JUV	SDM
1	Unión Sacas	3	2	1	0	8	3	+5	7			4–2	
2	Deportivo Municipal (Usibamba)	3	2	1	0	6	1	+5	7	1–1			
3	Juventud Cocaya	3	1	0	2	3	6	−3	3		0–2		1–0
4	Sport Dos de Mayo	3	0	0	3	0	7	−7	0	0–3	0–3		

Legend: Blue = home team win; Yellow = draw; Red = away team win.
Rules for classification: 1) Points; 2) Goal difference; 3) Goals for; 4) Fair play points; 5) Drawing of lots.

==== Group E ====
Pos	Team	Pld	W	D	L	GF	GA	GD	Pts	CHA	SUC	CON	YAU
1	Atlético Chanchamayo	3	2	1	0	8	1	+7	7		1–1	2–0	
2	Deportivo Sucre	3	2	1	0	4	1	+3	7				2–0
3	Defensor Concepción	3	1	0	2	4	4	0	3		0–1		
4	Social Yauli	3	0	0	3	1	11	−10	0	0–5		1–4	

Legend: Blue = home team win; Yellow = draw; Red = away team win.
Rules for classification: 1) Points; 2) Goal difference; 3) Goals for; 4) Fair play points; 5) Drawing of lots.

=== Second Stage ===
==== Group A ====
Pos	Team	Pld	W	D	L	GF	GA	GD	Pts	CHA	MUN	LOL	FER
1	Atlético Chanchamayo	3	2	1	0	5	0	+5	7		0–0	2–0	
2	Deportivo Municipal (Usibamba)	3	1	2	0	3	0	+3	5				3–0
3	Echa Lolo	3	1	1	1	3	2	+1	4		0–0		3–0
4	Ferretería Meza	3	0	0	3	0	9	−9	0	0–3			

Legend: Blue = home team win; Yellow = draw; Red = away team win.
Rules for classification: 1) Points; 2) Goal difference; 3) Goals for; 4) Fair play points; 5) Drawing of lots.

==== Group B ====
Pos	Team	Pld	W	D	L	GF	GA	GD	Pts	COR	CON	MUN	PRO
1	Defensor Cormis	3	2	1	0	6	1	+5	7			1–0	4–0
2	Defensor Concepción	3	1	2	0	5	4	+1	5	1–1			
3	Defensor Municipal (Perené)	3	1	0	2	5	6	−1	3		1–2		4–3
4	Progreso (Tayacaja)	3	0	1	2	5	10	−5	1		2–2		

Legend: Blue = home team win; Yellow = draw; Red = away team win.
Rules for classification: 1) Points; 2) Goal difference; 3) Goals for; 4) Fair play points; 5) Drawing of lots.

==== Group C ====
Pos	Team	Pld	W	D	L	GF	GA	GD	Pts	MUN	SUC	PRO	SAC
1	Deportivo Municipal (Pangoa)	3	2	1	0	6	4	+2	7		1–0		
2	Deportivo Sucre	3	2	0	1	3	2	+1	6			1–0	2–1
3	Progreso Muruhuay	3	0	2	1	4	5	−1	2	2–2			2–2
4	Unión Sacas	3	0	1	2	5	7	−2	1	2–3			

Legend: Blue = home team win; Yellow = draw; Red = away team win.
Rules for classification: 1) Points; 2) Goal difference; 3) Goals for; 4) Fair play points; 5) Drawing of lots.

==== Group D ====
Pos	Team	Pld	W	D	L	GF	GA	GD	Pts	WAN	ALI	MUN	JUV
1	Atlético Wanka	3	3	0	0	7	1	+6	9		1–0		
2	Alipio Ponce	3	2	0	1	10	2	+8	6			4–1	6–0
3	Deportivo Municipal (Huayre)	3	1	0	2	5	8	−3	3	1–4			
4	Juventud Cocaya	3	0	0	3	0	11	−11	0	0–2		0–3	

Legend: Blue = home team win; Yellow = draw; Red = away team win.
Rules for classification: 1) Points; 2) Goal difference; 3) Goals for; 4) Fair play points; 5) Drawing of lots.

=== Third Stage ===
==== Group A ====
Pos	Team	Pld	W	D	L	GF	GA	GD	Pts	SUC	CHA	CON	ALI
1	Deportivo Sucre	3	2	0	1	6	4	+2	6			1–0	3–1
2	Atlético Chanchamayo	3	2	0	1	4	3	+1	6	3–2			1–0
3	Defensor Concepción	3	1	0	2	3	4	−1	3		1–0		
4	Alipio Ponce	3	1	0	2	4	6	−2	3			3–2	

Legend: Blue = home team win; Yellow = draw; Red = away team win.
Rules for classification: 1) Points; 2) Goal difference; 3) Goals for; 4) Fair play points; 5) Drawing of lots.

==== Group B ====
Pos	Team	Pld	W	D	L	GF	GA	GD	Pts	MUN	USI	WAN	COR
1	Deportivo Municipal (Pangoa)	3	2	1	0	8	4	+4	7			2–2	
2	Deportivo Municipal (Usibamba)	3	2	0	1	3	4	−1	6	0–3			1–0
3	Atlético Wanka	3	0	2	1	3	4	−1	2		1–2		0–0
4	Defensor Cormis	3	0	1	2	2	4	−2	1	2–3			

Legend: Blue = home team win; Yellow = draw; Red = away team win.
Rules for classification: 1) Points; 2) Goal difference; 3) Goals for; 4) Fair play points; 5) Drawing of lots.

=== Liguilla Final ===
Pos	Team	Pld	W	D	L	GF	GA	GD	Pts	Qualification or relegation	MUN	SUC	CHA	USI
1	Deportivo Municipal (Pangoa)	3	1	2	0	4	3	+1	5	Advance to 2024 Copa Perú		0–0		
2	Deportivo Sucre	3	1	2	0	2	1	+1	5	Advance to 2024 Copa Perú			1–1	
3	Atlético Chanchamayo	3	0	2	1	3	4	−1	2		2–3			0–0
4	Deportivo Municipal (Usibamba)	3	0	2	1	1	2	−1	2		1–1	0–1		

Updated to match(es) played on unknown. Source:
Legend: Blue = home team win; Yellow = draw; Red = away team win.
Rules for classification: 1) Points; 2) Goal difference; 3) Goals for; 4) Fair play points; 5) Drawing of lots.

==== First place playoff ====
Team 1	Score	Team 2
Deportivo Municipal (Pangoa)	1–0	Deportivo Sucre

== Liga Departamental de La Libertad ==
=== Zona Costa ===
==== Group A ====
Pos	Team	Pld	W	D	L	GF	GA	GD	Pts	INC	TAB	CRU	REA
1	El Inca	6	5	1	0	21	5	+16	16		2–2	2–0	5–1
2	Sporting Tabaco	6	3	2	1	16	6	+10	11	0–2		6–1	6–0
3	Cruzeiro	6	1	1	4	6	18	−12	4	0–5	1–2		3–2
4	Sport Real	6	0	2	4	6	20	−14	2	2–5	0–0	1–1	

Legend: Blue = home team win; Yellow = draw; Red = away team win.
Rules for classification: 1) Points; 2) Goal difference; 3) Goals for; 4) Fair play points; 5) Drawing of lots.

==== Group B ====
Pos	Team	Pld	W	D	L	GF	GA	GD	Pts	RIV	DEF	CHA	GRA
1	Sport River	6	4	1	1	8	4	+4	13		1–0	0–1	3–1
2	Defensor Porvenir	6	3	1	2	11	6	+5	10	1–2		5–1	2–1
3	Nuevo Chao	6	2	2	2	6	9	−3	8	1–2	0–0		1–1
4	Juventud Grau	6	0	2	4	5	11	−6	2	0–0	1–3	1–2	

Legend: Blue = home team win; Yellow = draw; Red = away team win.
Rules for classification: 1) Points; 2) Goal difference; 3) Goals for; 4) Fair play points; 5) Drawing of lots.

==== Group C ====
Pos	Team	Pld	W	D	L	GF	GA	GD	Pts	SEM	UPN	TRA
1	Academia Juan Seminario	4	3	0	1	7	3	+4	9		4–2	1–0
2	Unión Pueblo Nuevo	3	1	0	2	4	6	−2	3	1–0		1–2
3	Training Gol	3	1	0	2	2	4	−2	3	0–2	—	

Legend: Blue = home team win; Yellow = draw; Red = away team win.
Rules for classification: 1) Points; 2) Goal difference; 3) Goals for; 4) Fair play points; 5) Drawing of lots.

==== Quarterfinals ====
Team 1	Agg.	Team 2	1st leg	2nd leg
Sport River	3–0	Academia Juan Seminario	2–0	1–0
Sporting Tabaco	2–8	El Inca	0–5	2–3

=== Zona Ande ===
Pos	Team	Pld	W	D	L	GF	GA	GD	Pts	JUV	SAN	TAY
1	Juventus	4	3	0	1	10	2	+8	9		4–1	5–0
2	San Pedro del Valle	4	2	0	2	5	5	0	6	1–0		3–0
3	Sport Tayabamba	4	1	0	3	1	9	−8	3	0–1	1–0	

Legend: Blue = home team win; Yellow = draw; Red = away team win.
Rules for classification: 1) Points; 2) Goal difference; 3) Goals for; 4) Fair play points; 5) Drawing of lots.

=== Liguilla Final ===
Pos	Team	Pld	W	D	L	GF	GA	GD	Pts	Qualification or relegation	JUV	INC	RIV	SAN
1	Juventus	6	4	1	1	12	6	+6	13	Advance to 2024 Copa Perú		2–0	3–2	5–1
2	El Inca	6	2	3	1	10	9	+1	9	Advance to 2024 Copa Perú	2–0		3–3	2–1
3	Sport River	6	2	2	2	13	10	+3	8		1–2	2–2		2–0
4	San Pedro del Valle	6	0	2	4	3	13	−10	2		0–0	1–1	0–3	

Legend: Blue = home team win; Yellow = draw; Red = away team win.
Rules for classification: 1) Points; 2) Goal difference; 3) Goals for; 4) Fair play points; 5) Drawing of lots.

== Liga Departamental de Lambayeque ==
=== Group stage ===
==== Group A ====
Pos	Team	Pld	W	D	L	GF	GA	GD	Pts	LUT	MUN	JES	CRU
1	Deportivo Lute	3	2	0	1	3	2	+1	6				1–0
2	Deportivo Municipal (Túcume)	3	1	1	1	3	3	0	4	1–0			2–2
3	Jesús Monterroso	3	1	1	1	2	2	0	4	1–2	1–0		
4	Cruz de Chalpón	3	0	2	1	3	3	0	2			0–0	

Legend: Blue = home team win; Yellow = draw; Red = away team win.
Rules for classification: 1) Points; 2) Goal difference; 3) Goals for; 4) Fair play points; 5) Drawing of lots.

===== Tiebreaker =====
Team 1	Score	Team 2
Deportivo Municipal (Túcume)	0–0 (4–2 p)	Jesús Monterroso

==== Group B ====
Pos	Team	Pld	W	D	L	GF	GA	GD	Pts	PER	OYO	JUA	SAN
1	Peroles Las Vegas	3	2	1	0	4	2	+2	7		1–1	1–0	
2	Defensor Oyotún	3	1	1	1	4	4	0	4			2–1	1–2
3	Juan Aurich Pastor	3	1	0	2	4	5	−1	3				3–2
4	Santa Rosa	3	1	0	2	5	6	−1	3	1–2			

Legend: Blue = home team win; Yellow = draw; Red = away team win.
Rules for classification: 1) Points; 2) Goal difference; 3) Goals for; 4) Fair play points; 5) Drawing of lots.

==== Group C ====
Pos	Team	Pld	W	D	L	GF	GA	GD	Pts	ALI	CAS	VAS	TRE
1	Alianza Buenos Aires	3	2	0	1	3	2	+1	6			1–0	0–2
2	Castaños FC	3	1	1	1	5	5	0	4	0–2			
3	Vasco da Gama	3	1	1	1	4	4	0	4		3–3		1–0
4	Tres Marías	3	1	0	2	2	3	−1	3		0–2		

Legend: Blue = home team win; Yellow = draw; Red = away team win.
Rules for classification: 1) Points; 2) Goal difference; 3) Goals for; 4) Fair play points; 5) Drawing of lots.

===== Tiebreaker =====
Team 1	Score	Team 2
Vasco da Gama	3–2	Castaños FC

==== Group D ====
Pos	Team	Pld	W	D	L	GF	GA	GD	Pts	SMA	ZEL	BOL	MAN
1	Unión Juventud San Martín	3	2	0	1	6	2	+4	6				2–1
2	Zelada Jr.	3	2	0	1	5	2	+3	6	1–0			3–0
3	Defensor Bolognesi	3	1	1	1	4	7	−3	4	0–4	2–1		
4	Manuel Gonzales Prada	3	0	1	2	3	7	−4	1			2–2	

Legend: Blue = home team win; Yellow = draw; Red = away team win.
Rules for classification: 1) Points; 2) Goal difference; 3) Goals for; 4) Fair play points; 5) Drawing of lots.

=== Quarterfinals ===
Team 1	Agg.	Team 2	1st leg	2nd leg
Alianza Buenos Aires	1–6	Zelada Jr.	0–3	1–3
Defensor Oyotún	2–3	Deportivo Lute	0–1	2–2
Deportivo Municipal (Túcume)	2–2 (2–4 p)	Peroles Las Vegas	2–2	0–0
Vasco da Gama	2–3 (3–5 p)	Unión Juventud San Martín	2–1	0–2

=== Semifinals ===
Team 1	Agg.	Team 2	1st leg	2nd leg
Zelada Jr.	1–3	Deportivo Lute	1–2	0–1
Peroles Las Vegas	0–2	Unión Juventud San Martín	0–2	0–0

=== Finals ===
Team 1	Agg.	Team 2	1st leg	2nd leg
Unión Juventud San Martín	1–2	Deportivo Lute	1–1	0–1

== Liga Departamental de Lima ==
=== Round of 16 ===
Team 1	Agg.	Team 2	1st leg	2nd leg
Virgen del Rosario	2–2 (3–0 p)	Chacarita Caqui	1–1	1–1
Juventud Chocas	0–4	Arsenal Lawn Tennis	0–2	0–2
Deportivo Oyotún	0–5	Real Independiente	0–1	0–4
Unión Bujama	0–4	Juventud Huracán	0–1	0–3
Vasco da Gama	2–1	Bella Esperanza	1–0	1–1
Pacífico	3–0	Atlético Minero	2–0	1–0
Juventud Cruz de Chonta	3–0	San Antonio de Trapiche	2–0	1–0
Juventud Puente Bolívar	0–7	San Lorenzo de Porococha	0–1	0–6

=== Quarterfinals ===
Team 1	Agg.	Team 2	1st leg	2nd leg
Arsenal Lawn Tennis	4–5	Juventud Huracán	2–4	2–1
Virgen del Rosario	2–2 (1–3 p)	Real Independiente	2–1	0–1
Juventud Cruz de Chonta	6–2	Vasco da Gama	2–2	4–0
Pacífico	2–1	San Lorenzo de Porococha	1–0	1–1

=== Semifinals ===
Team 1	Agg.	Team 2	1st leg	2nd leg
Pacífico	4–1	Juventud Huracán	1–0	3–1
Real Independiente	1–1 (5–4 p)	Juventud Cruz de Chonta	1–1	0–0

=== Final ===
Team 1	Score	Team 2
Pacífico	0–1	Real Independiente

== Liga Departamental de Loreto ==
=== Group Stage ===
==== Group A ====
Pos	Team	Pld	W	D	L	GF	GA	GD	Pts	CAB	DOC	MUN	MER
1	Deportivo Caballo Cocha	3	2	1	0	12	5	+7	7			6–1	4–2
2	Dolce Bretaña	3	2	1	0	12	5	+7	7	2–2		5–2	5–1
3	Deportivo Municipal (Putumayo)	3	1	0	2	5	12	−7	3				2–1
4	MERV	3	0	0	3	4	11	−7	0				

Legend: Blue = home team win; Yellow = draw; Red = away team win.
Rules for classification: 1) Points; 2) Goal difference; 3) Goals for; 4) Fair play points; 5) Drawing of lots.

===== Tiebreaker =====
Team 1	Score	Team 2
Deportivo Caballo Cocha	1–2	Dolce Bretaña

==== Group B ====
Pos	Team	Pld	W	D	L	GF	GA	GD	Pts	MIL	TEC	CRI
1	Juventud Milagros	2	1	1	0	5	2	+3	4		2–2	3–0
2	Cultural Tecnológico	2	1	1	0	4	2	+2	4			2–0
3	Sporting Cristal (Requena)	2	0	0	2	0	5	−5	0			

Legend: Blue = home team win; Yellow = draw; Red = away team win.
Rules for classification: 1) Points; 2) Goal difference; 3) Goals for; 4) Fair play points; 5) Drawing of lots.

===== Tiebreaker =====
Team 1	Score	Team 2
Juventud Milagros	0–5	Cultural Tecnológico

==== Group C ====
Pos	Team	Pld	W	D	L	GF	GA	GD	Pts	CNI	DEF	REN
1	Estudiantil CNI	2	1	1	0	6	5	+1	4			
2	Defensor Loma	2	1	1	0	9	2	+7	4	2–2		
3	Renacer Tecnológico	2	0	0	2	3	11	−8	0	3–4	0–7	

Legend: Blue = home team win; Yellow = draw; Red = away team win.
Rules for classification: 1) Points; 2) Goal difference; 3) Goals for; 4) Fair play points; 5) Drawing of lots.

==== Group D ====
Pos	Team	Pld	W	D	L	GF	GA	GD	Pts	UGE	UNA	MAR	MUN
1	UGELAA	3	2	1	0	6	4	+2	7		1–1	3–2	2–1
2	UNAP	3	1	2	0	3	2	+1	5				
3	Atlético Marañón	3	1	0	2	4	5	−1	3		0–1		
4	Deportivo Municipal (Nauta)	3	0	1	2	3	5	−2	1		1–1	1–2	

Legend: Blue = home team win; Yellow = draw; Red = away team win.
Rules for classification: 1) Points; 2) Goal difference; 3) Goals for; 4) Fair play points; 5) Drawing of lots.

=== Liguilla Final ===
Pos	Team	Pld	W	D	L	GF	GA	GD	Pts	Qualification or relegation	CNI	DOL	UGE	TEC
1	Estudiantil CNI	3	3	0	0	5	0	+5	9	Advance to 2024 Copa Perú		1–0	3–0	1–0
2	Dolce Bretaña	3	2	0	1	4	2	+2	6	Advance to 2024 Copa Perú			2–1	2–0
3	UGELAA	3	1	0	2	3	5	−2	3					2–0
4	Cultural Tecnológico	3	0	0	3	0	5	−5	0					

Legend: Blue = home team win; Yellow = draw; Red = away team win.
Rules for classification: 1) Points; 2) Goal difference; 3) Goals for; 4) Fair play points; 5) Drawing of lots.

== Liga Departamental de Madre de Dios ==
=== Standings ===
Pos	Team	Pld	W	D	L	GF	GA	GD	Pts	Qualification or relegation	ALT	MUN	MAS	UNI
1	Alto Rendimiento	6	2	4	0	9	2	+7	10	Advance to 2024 Copa Perú		0–0	2–1	6–0
2	AFC Caychihue	6	2	4	0	6	3	+3	10	Advance to 2024 Copa Perú	0–0		0–0	2–0
3	La Masía Nace	6	1	2	3	8	7	+1	5		1–1	1–2		1–2
4	Unión Empresas	6	1	2	3	4	15	−11	5		0–0	2–2	0–4	

Legend: Blue = home team win; Yellow = draw; Red = away team win.
Rules for classification: 1) Points; 2) Goal difference; 3) Goals for; 4) Fair play points; 5) Drawing of lots.

==== Tiebreaker ====
Team 1	Score	Team 2
Alto Rendimiento	5–0	AFC Caychihue

== Liga Departamental de Moquegua ==
=== Standings ===
Pos	Team	Pld	W	D	L	GF	GA	GD	Pts	Qualification or relegation	ANT	HIJ	PUM	TIC
1	Real San Antonio	6	4	1	1	16	6	+10	13	Advance to 2024 Copa Perú		1–3	3–0	4–0
2	Hijos del Altiplano y del Pacífico	6	2	4	0	8	5	+3	10	Advance to 2024 Copa Perú	2–2		0–0	2–1
3	Pumas	6	2	2	2	7	6	+1	8		0–1	1–1		4–0
4	Academia Ticsani	6	0	1	5	3	17	−14	1		1–5	0–0	1–2	

Legend: Blue = home team win; Yellow = draw; Red = away team win.
Rules for classification: 1) Points; 2) Goal difference; 3) Goals for; 4) Fair play points; 5) Drawing of lots.

== Liga Departamental de Pasco ==
=== First Stage ===
Team 1	Agg.	Team 2	1st leg	2nd leg
Ecosem Pasco	2–2 (5–4 p)	ADT Huaraucaca	1–1	1–1
FC Tecnomin	4–2	San Juan de Yanacocha	2–1	2–1
Mariscal Castilla (Oxapampa)	1–10	Sociedad Tiro 28	1–2	0–8
Juventud Municipal	6–3	Pedro Ruiz Gallo	6–2	0–1

=== Liguilla Final ===
Pos	Team	Pld	W	D	L	GF	GA	GD	Pts	Qualification or relegation	SOC	ECO	TEC	JUV
1	Sociedad Tiro 28	3	2	1	0	7	1	+6	7	Advance to 2024 Copa Perú		1–1	3–0	3–0
2	Ecosem Pasco	3	2	1	0	5	2	+3	7	Advance to 2024 Copa Perú				
3	FC Tecnomin	3	1	0	2	4	6	−2	3			1–2		3–1
4	Juventud Municipal	3	0	0	3	1	8	−7	0			0–2		

Legend: Blue = home team win; Yellow = draw; Red = away team win.
Rules for classification: 1) Points; 2) Goal difference; 3) Goals for; 4) Fair play points; 5) Drawing of lots.

== Liga Departamental de Piura ==
=== Group Stage ===
==== Group A ====
Pos	Team	Pld	W	D	L	GF	GA	GD	Pts	TOR	BEL	JUV
1	Atlético Torino	4	2	2	0	4	1	+3	8		0–0	2–0
2	Juventud Bellavista	4	2	1	1	3	2	+1	7	0–1		2–1
3	Juventus (Paita)	4	0	1	3	2	6	−4	1	1–1	0–1	

Legend: Blue = home team win; Yellow = draw; Red = away team win.
Rules for classification: 1) Points; 2) Goal difference; 3) Goals for; 4) Fair play points; 5) Drawing of lots.

==== Group B ====
Pos	Team	Pld	W	D	L	GF	GA	GD	Pts	MUN	SMA	OLI
1	Deportivo Municipal (Vice)	4	3	0	1	7	3	+4	9		1–0	3–1
2	EF San Martín (Marcavelica)	4	2	1	1	5	1	+4	7	2–0		3–0
3	Olimpia (La Unión)	4	0	1	3	1	9	−8	1	0–3	0–0	

Legend: Blue = home team win; Yellow = draw; Red = away team win.
Rules for classification: 1) Points; 2) Goal difference; 3) Goals for; 4) Fair play points; 5) Drawing of lots.

==== Group C ====
Pos	Team	Pld	W	D	L	GF	GA	GD	Pts	CAY	POR
1	Caysa Yapatera	2	1	1	0	4	3	+1	4		2–1
2	Porvenir Huáscar	2	0	1	1	3	4	−1	1	2–2	

Legend: Blue = home team win; Yellow = draw; Red = away team win.
Rules for classification: 1) Points; 2) Goal difference; 3) Goals for; 4) Fair play points; 5) Drawing of lots.

==== Group D ====
Pos	Team	Pld	W	D	L	GF	GA	GD	Pts	CAU	AYA
1	Juventud Cautivo	2	2	0	0	7	0	+7	6		6–0
2	Real Ayabaca	2	0	0	2	0	7	−7	0	0–1	

Legend: Blue = home team win; Yellow = draw; Red = away team win.
Rules for classification: 1) Points; 2) Goal difference; 3) Goals for; 4) Fair play points; 5) Drawing of lots.

==== Group E ====
Pos	Team	Pld	W	D	L	GF	GA	GD	Pts	COM	RAM	TIG
1	Asociación Comerciantes	4	3	0	1	8	5	+3	9		2–0	2–0
2	Ramón Castilla	4	2	0	2	10	8	+2	6	4–1		6–3
3	Los Tigres	4	1	0	3	6	11	−5	3	1–3	2–0	

Legend: Blue = home team win; Yellow = draw; Red = away team win.
Rules for classification: 1) Points; 2) Goal difference; 3) Goals for; 4) Fair play points; 5) Drawing of lots.

==== Group F ====
Pos	Team	Pld	W	D	L	GF	GA	GD	Pts	RAC	EST	TOR
1	Racing (Tambogrande)	4	2	0	2	7	6	+1	6		2–1	2–0
2	Estudiantes Chancay	4	2	0	2	9	9	0	6	3–2		2–1
3	Asociación Torino	4	2	0	2	7	8	−1	6	2–1	4–3	

Legend: Blue = home team win; Yellow = draw; Red = away team win.
Rules for classification: 1) Points; 2) Goal difference; 3) Goals for; 4) Fair play points; 5) Drawing of lots.

===== Tiebreakers =====
Team 1	Score	Team 2
Asociación Torino	2–5	Racing (Tambogrande)
Racing (Tambogrande)	5–3	Estudiantes Chancay

==== Group G ====
Pos	Team	Pld	W	D	L	GF	GA	GD	Pts	MAR	SAL	SHA
1	UD Marítimo	4	2	2	0	12	2	+10	8		2–1	9–0
2	UD Salitral	4	2	1	1	10	7	+3	7	1–1		6–3
3	Sport Shanga	4	0	1	3	4	17	−13	1	0–0	1–2	

Legend: Blue = home team win; Yellow = draw; Red = away team win.
Rules for classification: 1) Points; 2) Goal difference; 3) Goals for; 4) Fair play points; 5) Drawing of lots.

==== Group H ====
Pos	Team	Pld	W	D	L	GF	GA	GD	Pts	MAR	HAL	UNI
1	Sport Marítimo	4	2	2	0	8	4	+4	8		1–1	3–0
2	Halcones de Huaquilla	4	1	3	0	7	4	+3	6	2–2		3–0
3	Unión Viviate	4	0	1	3	2	9	−7	1	1–2	1–1	

Legend: Blue = home team win; Yellow = draw; Red = away team win.
Rules for classification: 1) Points; 2) Goal difference; 3) Goals for; 4) Fair play points; 5) Drawing of lots.

=== Second Stage ===
Team 1	Agg.	Team 2	1st leg	2nd leg
Asociación Comerciantes	1–4	Atlético Torino	1–1	0–3
Juventud Cautivo	4–0	Racing (Tambogrande)	3–0	1–0
Halcones de Huaquilla	2–3	Caysa Yapatera	2–1	0–2
UD Marítimo	1–1	Juventud Bellavista	1–0	0–1
Sport Marítimo	1–1 (5–6 p)	UD Salitral	1–0	0–1
Deportivo Municipal (Vice)	4–0	EF San Martín (Marcavelica)	4–0	0–0

=== Quarterfinals ===
Team 1	Agg.	Team 2	1st leg	2nd leg
Sport Marítimo	2–1	Juventud Bellavista	2–1	annulled
Juventud Cautivo	2–1	Caysa Yapatera	2–1	0–0
UD Salitral	1–2	Deportivo Municipal (Vice)	0–0	1–2
Halcones de Huaquilla	1–4	Atlético Torino	1–1	0–3

=== Semifinals ===
Team 1	Agg.	Team 2	1st leg	2nd leg
Deportivo Municipal (Vice)	2–1	Atlético Torino	2–0	0–1
Sport Marítimo	0–3	Juventud Cautivo	0–2	0–1

=== Final ===
Team 1	Score	Team 2
Juventud Cautivo	2–0	Deportivo Municipal (Vice)

== Liga Departamental de Puno ==
=== Group Stage ===
==== Group A ====
Pos	Team	Pld	W	D	L	GF	GA	GD	Pts	UNI	PEÑ	PUK	DIA
1	Unión Soratira	6	5	1	0	23	5	+18	16		2–0	5–0	6–0
2	Peñón de Oro	6	4	1	1	14	8	+6	13	3–3		2–0	5–1
3	Deportivo Municipal Puka Llaqta	6	2	0	4	8	12	−4	6	1–2	1–2		3–0
4	Diablos Rojos (Huatasani)	6	0	0	6	4	24	−20	0	1–5	1–2	1–3	

Legend: Blue = home team win; Yellow = draw; Red = away team win.
Rules for classification: 1) Points; 2) Goal difference; 3) Goals for; 4) Fair play points; 5) Drawing of lots.

==== Group B ====
Pos	Team	Pld	W	D	L	GF	GA	GD	Pts	DIA	RAC	MIN	GRU
1	Diablos Rojos	6	4	1	1	10	6	+4	13		1–0	3–1	2–1
2	Racing (Cuyocuyo)	6	3	2	1	10	5	+5	11	2–0		2–0	3–1
3	Minera Los Andes	6	2	1	3	7	11	−4	7	0–2	2–2		2–1
4	Grupo Fameca	6	0	2	4	7	12	−5	2	2–2	1–1	1–2	

Legend: Blue = home team win; Yellow = draw; Red = away team win.
Rules for classification: 1) Points; 2) Goal difference; 3) Goals for; 4) Fair play points; 5) Drawing of lots.

==== Group C ====
Pos	Team	Pld	W	D	L	GF	GA	GD	Pts	ANB	ANG	LEO	CUL
1	ANBA Perú	6	5	0	1	19	5	+14	15		2–1	4–1	7–2
2	Unión Ángeles de Vizcachani	6	5	0	1	14	3	+11	15	1–0		2–0	5–1
3	Leones de San Isidro	6	1	0	5	6	19	−13	3	0–3	0–2		1–5
4	Cultural Panamericana	6	1	0	5	11	23	−12	3	0–3	0–3	3–4	

Legend: Blue = home team win; Yellow = draw; Red = away team win.
Rules for classification: 1) Points; 2) Goal difference; 3) Goals for; 4) Fair play points; 5) Drawing of lots.

==== Group D ====
Pos	Team	Pld	W	D	L	GF	GA	GD	Pts	CAD	MAG	CER	MUN
1	CADEC Callapani	6	5	0	1	12	4	+8	15		2–1	3–1	2–0
2	Magisterio Ilave	6	4	0	2	12	6	+6	12	1–0		1–0	5–0
3	DAC Cerro Colorado	6	1	1	4	6	11	−5	4	1–3	1–2		1–1
4	Deportivo Municipal (Desaguadero)	6	1	1	4	5	14	−9	4	0–2	3–2	1–2	

Legend: Blue = home team win; Yellow = draw; Red = away team win.
Rules for classification: 1) Points; 2) Goal difference; 3) Goals for; 4) Fair play points; 5) Drawing of lots.

==== Group E ====
Pos	Team	Pld	W	D	L	GF	GA	GD	Pts	CUL	DEF	DIN	CNI
1	Cultural Tambillo	6	5	0	1	22	3	+19	15		4–0	9–0	5–2
2	Defensor Carata	6	4	0	2	13	10	+3	12	1–0		4–2	3–1
3	Unión Dínamo (Taraco)	6	2	0	4	12	24	−12	6	0–1	3–2		5–4
4	CNI Mariateguino	6	1	0	5	11	21	−10	3	0–3	0–3	4–2	

Legend: Blue = home team win; Yellow = draw; Red = away team win.
Rules for classification: 1) Points; 2) Goal difference; 3) Goals for; 4) Fair play points; 5) Drawing of lots.

==== Group F ====
Pos	Team	Pld	W	D	L	GF	GA	GD	Pts	UFA	CEB	SEL
1	UFA Pacaje	3	2	0	1	5	3	+2	6		2–1	2–0
2	Cebollitas Macarí	4	1	2	1	4	4	0	5	2–1		0–0
3	Selección Lluco	3	0	2	1	1	3	−2	2	—	1–1	

Legend: Blue = home team win; Yellow = draw; Red = away team win.
Rules for classification: 1) Points; 2) Goal difference; 3) Goals for; 4) Fair play points; 5) Drawing of lots.

=== Second Stage ===
==== Group A ====
Pos	Team	Pld	W	D	L	GF	GA	GD	Pts	UNI	DIA	UFA	ANG
1	Unión Soratira	6	4	1	1	13	6	+7	13		1–2	4–1	2–1
2	Diablos Rojos	6	2	4	0	9	6	+3	10	0–0		1–1	1–1
3	UFA Pacaje	6	2	1	3	9	14	−5	7	2–4	1–3		1–0
4	Unión Ángeles de Vizcachani	6	0	2	4	6	11	−5	2	0–2	2–2	2–3	

Legend: Blue = home team win; Yellow = draw; Red = away team win.
Rules for classification: 1) Points; 2) Goal difference; 3) Goals for; 4) Fair play points; 5) Drawing of lots.

==== Group B ====
Pos	Team	Pld	W	D	L	GF	GA	GD	Pts	ANB	PEÑ	MIN	MAG
1	ANBA Perú	6	4	1	1	11	3	+8	13		1–0	2–0	5–0
2	Peñón de Oro	6	2	2	2	6	7	−1	8	0–0		1–0	3–2
3	Minera Los Andes	6	2	1	3	7	8	−1	7	1–2	2–1		1–1
4	Magisterio Ilave	6	1	2	3	7	13	−6	5	2–1	1–1	1–2	

Legend: Blue = home team win; Yellow = draw; Red = away team win.
Rules for classification: 1) Points; 2) Goal difference; 3) Goals for; 4) Fair play points; 5) Drawing of lots.

==== Group C ====
Pos	Team	Pld	W	D	L	GF	GA	GD	Pts	CUL	RAC	CAD	DEF
1	Cultural Tambillo	6	4	2	0	10	3	+7	14		2–0	3–1	2–0
2	Racing (Cuyocuyo)	6	3	1	2	13	10	+3	10	1–1		2–1	2–0
3	CADEC Callapani	6	2	1	3	10	10	0	7	1–2	4–3		4–1
4	Defensor Carata	6	0	2	4	4	14	−10	2	1–1	2–5	0–0	

Legend: Blue = home team win; Yellow = draw; Red = away team win.
Rules for classification: 1) Points; 2) Goal difference; 3) Goals for; 4) Fair play points; 5) Drawing of lots.

==== Tiebreaker ====
Team 1	Score	Team 2
Diablos Rojos	3–1	Racing (Cuyocuyo)

=== Semifinals ===
Team 1	Agg.	Team 2	1st leg	2nd leg
ANBA Perú	2–2 (3–5 p)	Unión Soratira	1–1	1–1
Cultural Tambillo*	3–1	Diablos Rojos	3–0	0–1

- Cultural Tambillo was disqualified for not having registration or registration in the district league.

== Liga Departamental de San Martín ==
=== First Stage ===
==== Zona Norte ====
Team 1	Agg.	Team 2	1st leg	2nd leg
ADO Tabalosos	2–1	Emilio San Martín	0–0	2–1
Atlético Awajun	2–0	Real Nativos	1–0	1–0
Unión Moyobamba	5–6	Deportivo Ucrania	1–2	4–4

==== Zona Centro ====
Team 1	Agg.	Team 2	1st leg	2nd leg
ATC	3–6	Real Ishichihui	0–0	3–6
Unión Santa Martha	2–4	Unión Tarapoto	1–0	1–4
Grandez FC	6–3	Power Club	4–2	2–1

==== Zona Sur ====
Team 1	Agg.	Team 2	1st leg	2nd leg
Oriental Sporting	1–1	Biavo	1–0	0–1
Unión Cuzco	4–3	Deportivo Comercio	2–3	2–0
Defensor Víveres	2–1	Cantorcillo FC	1–0	1–1

=== Second Stage ===
Team 1	Agg.	Team 2	1st leg	2nd leg
Emilio San Martín	2–5	Real Ishichihui	1–4	1–1
Cantorcillo FC	1–4	Atlético Awajún	0–0	1–4
ATC	1–5	Grandez FC	1–3	0–2
Unión Santa Martha	0–1	Defensor Víveres	0–0	0–1
Biavo	4–2	Unión Tarapoto	0–0	4–2
Deportivo Comercio	0–1	ADO Tabalosos	0–1	0–0
Unión Moyobamba	2–2 (2–3 p)	Deportivo Ucrania	1–1	1–1
Oriental Sporting	4–3	Unión Cuzco	2–0	2–3

=== Quarterfinals ===
Team 1	Agg.	Team 2	1st leg	2nd leg
Defensor Víveres	1–1 (3–1 p)	Grandez FC	0–0	1–1
Biavo	2–1	Real Ishichihui	1–0	1–1
ADO Tabalosos	4–2	Atlético Awajún	1–0	3–2
Deportivo Ucrania	6–4	Oriental Sporting	6–1	0–3

=== Semifinals ===
Team 1	Agg.	Team 2	1st leg	2nd leg
Defensor Víveres	2–3	Biavo	1–0	1–3
Deportivo Ucrania	3–0	ADO Tabalosos	3–0	0–0

=== Final ===
Team 1	Score	Team 2
Deportivo Ucrania	3–0	Biavo

== Liga Departamental de Tacna ==
=== First stage ===
Team 1	Agg.	Team 2	1st leg	2nd leg
Sporting Centauro	3–7	Bentín Tacna Heroica	3–3	0–4
Patriotas	1–1	Virgen de las Nieves	1–1	0–0
Real Miraflores	0–23	Deportivo Municipal (Locumba)	0–12	0–11
Cooperativa ITE	6–2	Sport Tarata	5–0	1–2

=== Group stage ===
==== Group 1 ====
Pos	Team	Pld	W	D	L	GF	GA	GD	Pts	VIR	MUN	ITE
1	Virgen de las Nieves	2	0	2	0	3	3	0	2		2–2	1–1
2	Deportivo Municipal (Locumba)	2	0	2	0	3	3	0	2			1–1
3	Cooperativa ITE	2	0	2	0	2	2	0	2			

Legend: Blue = home team win; Yellow = draw; Red = away team win.
Rules for classification: 1) Points; 2) Goal difference; 3) Goals for; 4) Fair play points; 5) Drawing of lots.

===== Tiebreaker =====
Team 1	Score	Team 2
Cooperativa ITE	1–1 (3–4 p)	Deportivo Municipal (Locumba)

==== Group 2 ====
Pos	Team	Pld	W	D	L	GF	GA	GD	Pts	BEN	PAT	TAR
1	Bentín Tacna Heroica	2	1	1	0	11	0	+11	4		0–0	11–0
2	Patriotas	2	1	1	0	4	1	+3	4			4–1
3	Sport Tarata	2	0	0	2	1	15	−14	0			

Legend: Blue = home team win; Yellow = draw; Red = away team win.
Rules for classification: 1) Points; 2) Goal difference; 3) Goals for; 4) Fair play points; 5) Drawing of lots.

=== Liguilla Final ===
Pos	Team	Pld	W	D	L	GF	GA	GD	Pts	Qualification or relegation	BEN	PAT	MUN	VIR
1	Bentín Tacna Heroica	3	3	0	0	10	1	+9	9	Advance to 2024 Copa Perú		2–0	3–0	
2	Patriotas	3	1	1	1	3	2	+1	4	Advance to 2024 Copa Perú			3–0	1–1
3	Deportivo Municipal (Locumba)	3	1	0	2	1	6	−5	3					1–0
4	Virgen de las Nieves	3	0	1	2	1	6	−5	1		1–5			

Updated to match(es) played on unknown. Source:
Legend: Blue = home team win; Yellow = draw; Red = away team win.
Rules for classification: 1) Points; 2) Goal difference; 3) Goals for; 4) Fair play points; 5) Drawing of lots.

== Liga Departamental de Tumbes ==
=== Standings ===
Pos	Team	Pld	W	D	L	GF	GA	GD	Pts	Qualification or relegation	BOL	TAC	UNI	INC	ALI	LEO
1	Sport Bolognesi	5	3	2	0	16	5	+11	11	Advance to 2024 Copa Perú		1–1			6–0	4–1
2	UD Tacna Libre	5	3	1	1	12	9	+3	10	Advance to 2024 Copa Perú			2–3		2–1	3–1
3	Sport Unión	5	2	2	1	11	10	+1	8		2–2			1–2		4–3
4	Inca Juniors	5	2	0	3	9	11	−2	6		1–3	3–4			1–0	
5	Alianza Zorritos	5	1	1	3	5	11	−6	4				1–1			3–1
6	Leoncio Prado	5	1	0	4	9	16	−7	3					3–2		

Legend: Blue = home team win; Yellow = draw; Red = away team win.
Rules for classification: 1) Points; 2) Goal difference; 3) Goals for; 4) Fair play points; 5) Drawing of lots.

== Liga Departamental de Ucayali ==
=== First stage ===
Team 1	Agg.	Team 2	1st leg	2nd leg
Colegio Comercio	1–2	Real Von Humboldt	1–0	0–2
Huracán (Puerto Inca)	1–12	Rauker	0–3	1–9
San Antonio de Padua	1–2	Escuela Municipal de Tournavista	1–1	0–1
Deportivo Municipal (Atalaya)	2–4	Sporting Cristal (Aguaytía)	0–1	2–3

=== Liguilla Final ===
Pos	Team	Pld	W	D	L	GF	GA	GD	Pts	Qualification or relegation	RAU	REA	ESC	CRI
1	Rauker	6	4	1	1	23	7	+16	13	Advance to 2024 Copa Perú		4–1	0–1	9–2
2	Real Von Humboldt	6	3	1	2	9	13	−4	10	Advance to 2024 Copa Perú	1–7		2–1	3–0
3	Escuela Municipal de Tournavista	6	2	2	2	5	5	0	8		0–1	0–0		2–1
4	Sporting Cristal (Aguaytía)	6	0	2	4	7	19	−12	2		2–2	1–2	1–1	

Legend: Blue = home team win; Yellow = draw; Red = away team win.
Rules for classification: 1) Points; 2) Goal difference; 3) Goals for; 4) Fair play points; 5) Drawing of lots.

== See also ==
- 2024 Liga 1
- 2024 Liga 2
- 2024 Copa Perú
- 2024 Liga Femenina
- 2024 Torneo de Promoción y Reserva
