= 2024 Liga 2 (Peru) =

Liga 2
- Season: 2024
- Dates: 6 April – 20 October 2024
- Champions: Alianza Universidad (1st title)
- Promoted: Alianza Universidad; Juan Pablo II College
- Relegated: Carlos Stein; Deportivo Municipal; Juan Aurich; Unión Huaral
- Matches: 180
- Goals: 496 (2.76 per match)
- Top goalscorer: Mathías López (16 goals)
- Biggest home win: Alianza Universidad 7–0 Carlos Stein (14 July)
- Biggest away win: Carlos Stein 1–8 Deportivo Llacuabamba (20 July)
- Highest scoring: Carlos Stein 1–8 Deportivo Llacuabamba (20 July)

The 2024 Liga 2 (known as the Liga 2 1xBet 2024 for sponsorship reasons) was the 72nd edition of the second tier of Federación Peruana de Futbol. This year's edition started on 6 April 2024 and ended on 20 October 2024.

== Format ==
For this season the league was expanded to 18 teams from the previous 14. On 22 February 2024, the Peruvian Football Federation announced a new format for the Liga 2. All 18 teams were divided into two groups in the Regional Stage based on their geographical location, being the Zona Norte (North Zone) and Zona Sur (South Zone). Each team played each other in a round-robin format and the top six teams advanced to the Group Stage and the bottom three into the Relegation Stage. In the group Stage, the 12 teams were divided into two groups of six, with the top three teams advancing to the play-offs, the first team entering the semi-finals and the next two the quarter-finals. Two teams were promoted to the Liga 1 and one was relegated. The following teams have changed division since the 2023 season:

== Teams ==
18 teams took part in the league in this season, four more than the previous season: the top 13 teams from the 2023 tournament, plus the 2023 Copa Perú champions, ADA and semi-finalists San Marcos, Juan Pablo II College, and UCV Moquegua. ADA and San Marcos played in the Liga 2 for the first time in their history this season. Comerciantes Unidos and Los Chankas were promoted to the 2024 Liga 1. Los Chankas promoted to Liga 1 for the first time in their history and Comerciantes Unidos promoted for the first time since 2016.

Academia Cantolao, Binacional, and Deportivo Municipal got relegated from the 2023 Liga 1. Alfonso Ugarte got relegated to the Copa Perú after being disqualified in the 2023 season.

Juan Aurich and Union Huaral had their licenses withdrawn for not fulfilling the requirements to participate set by the FPF and were disqualified from the competition.

=== Team changes ===
Promoted from 2023 Copa Perú	Relegated from 2023 Liga 1	Promoted to 2024 Liga 1	Relegated to 2024 Copa Perú
▲ADA (1st) ▲ San Marcos (2nd) ▲ Juan Pablo II College (3rd) ▲UCV Moquegua (4th)	▼ Binacional (17th) ▼ Deportivo Municipal (18th) ▼ Academia Cantolao (19th)	▲ Comerciantes Unidos (1st) ▲ Los Chankas (2nd)	▼ Alfonso Ugarte (14th)

=== Stadia and locations ===
Locations of the 2024 Liga 2 teams

Team	City	Stadium	Capacity
Academia Cantolao	Callao	Miguel Grau	17,000
ADA	Bagua Grande	San Luis	9,000
Alianza Universidad	Huánuco	Heraclio Tapia	25,000
Ayacucho	Ayacucho	Ciudad de Cumaná	15,000
Binacional	Juliaca	Guillermo Briceño Rosamedina	20,080
Carlos Stein	Lambayeque	César Flores Marigorda	7,000
Comerciantes	Iquitos	Max Augustín	24,576
Deportivo Coopsol	Chancay	Rómulo Shaw Cisneros	3,000
Deportivo Llacuabamba	Huamachuco	Municipal de Huamachuco	5,000
Deportivo Municipal	Lima	Iván Elías Moreno	11,000
Juan Aurich	Lambayeque	César Flores Marigorda	7,000
Juan Pablo II College	Chongoyape	Municipal de la Juventud	2,500
Pirata	Chongoyape	Municipal de la Juventud	2,500
San Marcos	Huaraz	Rosas Pampa	18,000
Santos	Nasca	Municipal de Nasca	10,000
UCV Moquegua	Moquegua	25 de Noviembre	21,073
Unión Huaral	Huaral	Julio Lores Colán	6,000
Universidad San Martín	Lima	Iván Elías Moreno	11,000

=== Personnel and kits ===
Team	Manager	Kit manufacturer	Main shirt sponsors
Academia Cantolao	(Argentina) Adrián Taffarel	Shumawa	Dafabet
ADA	(Peru) Omar Linares (caretaker)	Jave	Picrorana
Alianza Universidad	(Peru) Paul Cominges	Performance	UDH
Ayacucho	(Argentina) Jose Collatti	Real	Cooperativa Santa Maria, DoradoBet
Binacional	(Peru) Luis Flores	New Athletic	DoradoBet
Carlos Stein	(Peru) Ramón Perleche	Adeko	Vidavas
Comericantes	(Peru) Juan Carlos Bazalar	Crack	Jancos Corp.
Deportivo Coopsol	(Peru) Willy Laya	Atlos	Escudo Protector
Deportivo Llacuabamba	(Peru) Luis Revilla	trusports	Llacuabamba
Deportivo Municipal	(Peru) Hugo Sotil	Convert	Apuesto
~~Juan Aurich~~	~~(Peru) José Guevara~~	~~Jave~~	~~Tiendas EFE~~
Juan Pablo II College	(Peru) Santiago Acasiete	Real	Talen Sport, Boxes
Pirata	(Peru) Jahir Butrón	Front	Nuevas Tierras
San Marcos	(Peru) Nolberto Solano	Ander Sport	
Santos	(Peru) Francisco Pizarro	Palant	Explosivos del Sur S.A
~~Union Huaral~~	~~(Argentina) Alberto Valiente~~	~~Atlos~~	~~Solidario Peru~~
UCV Moquegua	(Peru) Jaime Serna	Palant	Clinica del Sur
Universidad San Martin	(Peru) Víctor Rivera	Convert	DoradoBet

=== Managerial changes ===
Team	Outgoing manager	Manner of departure	Date of vacancy	Position in table	Incoming manager	Date of appointment
Regional Stage
Academia Cantolao	(Peru) Jersi Socola	End of contract	14 September 2023	Pre-season	(Argentina) Adrián Taffarel	1 March 2024
Pirata	(Peru) Segundo Quiroz	End of contract	30 September 2023	Pre-season	(Peru) Jahir Butrón	1 January 2024
Binacional	(Argentina) César Vaioli	End of contract	30 October 2023	Pre-season	(Peru) Aristóteles Ramos	1 April 2024
Comerciantes	(Peru) Marciel Salazar	End of contract	23 November 2023	Pre-season	(Uruguay) Gustavo Roverano	23 November 2023
Ayacucho	(Argentina) Sergio Castellanos	Mutual agreement	12 December 2023	Pre-season	(Argentina) Jose Collati	20 March 2024
Deportivo Municipal	(Peru) Santiago Acasiete	Mutual agreement	13 December 2023	Pre-season	(Peru) Víctor Rivera	31 December 2023
Deportivo Coopsol	(Peru) Víctor Rivera	Mutual agreement	30 December 2023	Pre-season	(Peru) José Soto	6 March 2024
Carlos Stein	(Peru) Moisés Cabada	Sacked	31 December 2023	Pre-season	(Argentina) Marcelo Revuelta	1 March 2024
Santos	(Peru) José Soto	Mutual agreement	31 December 2023	Pre-season	(Argentina) Sergio Castellanos	10 January 2024
Union Huaral	(Peru) Javier Arce	End of contract	31 December 2023	Pre-season	(Argentina) Alberto Valiente	13 January 2024
ADA	(Peru) Roberto Arrelucea	Sacked	21 January 2024	Pre-season	(Argentina) Marcelo Grioni	24 January 2024
Binacional	(Peru) Aristóteles Ramos	Sacked	1 May 2024	7th	(Peru) César Chávez-Riva	1 May 2024
ADA	(Argentina) Marcelo Grioni	Sacked	8 May 2024	5th	(Peru) Luis La Torre	11 May 2024
Deportivo Coopsol	(Peru) José Soto	Sacked	31 May 2024	8th	(Argentina) Alberto Valiente	1 June 2024
Carlos Stein	(Argentina) Marcelo Revuelta	Sacked	1 June 2024	9th	(Peru) Gino Reyes (caretaker)	2 June 2024
UCV Moquegua	(Peru) Erick Torres	Sacked	3 June 2024		(Peru) Jaime Serna	4 June 2024
Binacional	(Peru) César Chávez-Riva	Sacked	10 June 2024		(Peru) Erick Torres	10 June 2024
Carlos Stein	(Peru) Gino Reyes	End of caretaker spell	10 June 2024		(Peru) Ramón Perleche	11 June 2024
ADA	(Peru) Luis La Torre	Sacked	29 June 2024	6th	(Peru) Juan Carlos Bazalar	29 June 2024
Juan Pablo II College	(Peru) Daniel Valderrama	Mutual agreement	30 June 2024	5th	(Peru) Alejandro Vásquez (caretaker)	1 July 2024
Deportivo Coopsol	(Argentina) Alberto Valiente	Sacked	4 July 2024		(Peru) Willy Laya	5 July 2024
Juan Pablo II College	(Peru) Alejandro Vásquez	End of caretaker spell	14 July 2024		(Peru) Santiago Acasiete	15 July 2024
Universidad San Martin	(Peru) Duilio Cisneros	Sacked	18 July 2024		(Peru) Raúl Penalillo	20 July 2024
Group Stage
Binacional	(Peru) Erick Torres	Sacked	31 July 2024		(Peru) Luis Flores	5 August 2024
Deportivo Municipal	(Peru) Víctor Rivera	Sacked	14 August 2024		(Peru) Hugo Sotil	25 August 2024
Universidad San Martin	(Peru) Raúl Penalillo	Sacked	17 August 2024		(Peru) Víctor Rivera	17 July 2024
San Marcos	(Peru) Eduardo Vargas	Sacked	6 September 2024	4th	(Peru) Nolberto Solano	6 September 2024
Deportivo Llacuabamba	(Argentina) Fernando Nogara	Sacked	9 September 2024		(Peru) Luis Revilla	9 September 2024
Santos	(Argentina) Sergio Castellanos	Sacked	12 September 2024		(Peru) Francisco Pizarro	12 September 2024
ADA	(Peru) Juan Carlos Bazalar	Resigned	24 September 2024		(Peru) Omar Linares (caretaker)	24 September 2024
Play-offs
Comerciantes	(Uruguay) Gustavo Roverano	Sacked	28 September 2024		(Peru) Juan Carlos Bazalar	28 September 2024

== Regional Stage ==
=== Zona Norte ===
Pos	Team	Pld	W	D	L	GF	GA	GD	Pts	Qualification	AUH	SMA	LLA	JP	ADA	PIR	STE
1	Alianza Universidad	12	9	2	1	30	7	+23	29	Advance to Group Stage		3–1	2–0	3–0	2–0	2–0	7–0
2	San Marcos	12	7	2	3	25	14	+11	23	Advance to Group Stage	1–2		2–1	0–0	6–0	2–1	3–1
3	Deportivo Llacuabamba	12	6	3	3	30	10	+20	21	Advance to Group Stage	0–0	2–2		1–0	5–0	4–0	6–0
4	Juan Pablo II College	12	4	3	5	10	15	−5	15	Advance to Group Stage	1–1	3–2	0–1		0–0	0–2	3–1
5	ADA	12	4	3	5	16	24	−8	15	Advance to Group Stage	2–1	0–2	1–1	3–1		1–1	4–1
6	Pirata	12	5	1	6	14	19	−5	13 (Note: The reduction of three points (-3) was applied to the club for not meeting the 2160 minutes of the minute bag in the Regional stage.)	Advance to Group Stage	1–2	0–2	2–1	1–2	2–1		3–2
7	Carlos Stein	12	0	0	12	10	46	−36	0	Qualification for Grupo Descenso	1–5	1–2	1–8	—	2–4	0–1	

Updated to match(es) played on 21 July 2024. Source:
Legend: Blue = home team win; Yellow = draw; Red = away team win.

=== Zona Sur ===
Pos	Team	Pld	W	D	L	GF	GA	GD	Pts	Qualification	CFC	SAN	AYA	MUN	CAN	COO	USM	UCV	BIN
1	Comerciantes	16	9	6	1	26	13	+13	33	Advance to Group Stage		1–0	2–1	1–1	2–0	2–2	1–0	2–2	6–1
2	Santos	16	7	4	5	15	12	+3	25	Advance to Group Stage	0–1		0–0	1–1	2–0	2–0	2–2	1–0	—
3	Ayacucho	16	7	3	6	15	14	+1	24	Advance to Group Stage	0–2	0–1		3–0	1–1	1–0	0–1	0–0	1–0
4	Deportivo Municipal	16	4	8	4	16	15	+1	20	Advance to Group Stage	1–1	0–0	—		3–2	2–1	1–1	0–0	2–0
5	Academia Cantolao	16	6	2	8	16	20	−4	20	Advance to Group Stage	1–2	2–1	1–2	0–2		1–2	1–1	1–0	1–0
6	Deportivo Coopsol	16	5	4	7	21	27	−6	19	Advance to Group Stage	0–0	0–2	2–1	1–1	0–3		2–3	4–2	2–1
7	Universidad San Martín	16	3	9	4	19	22	−3	18	Qualification for Grupo Descenso	1–1	2–3	2–1	2–2	0–1	1–1		2–2	0–0
8	UCV Moquegua	16	2	5	9	12	22	−10	11	Qualification for Grupo Descenso	1–2	1–0	0–1	2–0	0–1	1–4	1–1		0–1
9	Binacional	16	7	1	8	20	15	+5	10 (Note: The reduction of twelve points (-12) was applied to the club for not meeting the 2160 minutes of the minute bag in the Regional stage.)	Qualification for Grupo Descenso	2–0	2–0	2–3	—	2–0	4–0	3–0	2–0	

Updated to match(es) played on 31 July 2024. Source:
Legend: Blue = home team win; Yellow = draw; Red = away team win.

== Group Stage ==
In the Group Stage, teams ranked 1st and 2nd in the Regional stage started with 2 and 1 extra points respectively. Points earned during the Regional Stage did not carry over during the Group Stage.

=== Group A ===
Pos	Team	Pld	W	D	L	GF	GA	GD	Pts	Qualification	AUH	LLA	SAN	COO	ADA	MUN
1	Alianza Universidad	10	7	1	2	15	12	+3	24	Advance to semi-finals		2–0	2–2	0–2	1–0	—
2	Deportivo Llacuabamba	10	5	2	3	11	8	+3	17	Advance to quarter-finals	0–1		5–1	1–0	2–0	—
3	Santos	10	4	3	3	16	18	−2	16	Advance to quarter-finals	3–2	1–1		1–1	1–2	1–2
4	Deportivo Coopsol	10	4	3	3	11	11	0	15		2–3	2–2	1–2		2–1	—
5	ADA	10	4	1	5	10	15	−5	11 (Note: ADA was docked a total of 2 points (Resolution N°124-CL-FPF-2024).)		3–4	1–0	2–4	1–1		—
6	Deportivo Municipal (R)	10	1	0	9	2	1	+1	−1 (Note: The FPF suspends the license of Deportivo Municipal for its participation in Liga 2 and the competitions organized by CONMEBOL. In addition, the club was docked a total of 4 points (Resolution N°127-CL-FPF-2024).)	Participation in next season recalled	—	—	—	—	—	

Updated to match(es) played on 2024. Source: FPF
Legend: Blue = home team win; Yellow = draw; Red = away team win.
(R) Relegated

=== Group B ===
Pos	Team	Pld	W	D	L	GF	GA	GD	Pts	Qualification	JP	CAN	CFC	SMA	AYA	PIR
1	Juan Pablo II College	10	6	1	3	16	12	+4	19	Advance to semi-finals		3–1	3–2	1–1	2–3	2–1
2	Academia Cantolao	10	5	3	2	16	12	+4	18	Advance to quarter-finals	0–1		3–1	0–0	4–3	2–2
3	Comerciantes	10	2	5	3	13	11	+2	13	Advance to quarter-finals	1–0	0–0		5–0	1–1	1–1
4	San Marcos	10	4	3	3	14	15	−1	13 (Note: San Marcos was docked a total of 3 points (Resolution N°128-CL-FPF-2024 and N°061-TL-FPF-2024).)		1–0	0–1	1–1		4–3	4–1
5	Ayacucho (P)	10	3	1	6	21	23	−2	10	Reinstated to 2025 Liga 1	1–2	2–3	1–0	2–3		4–1
6	Pirata	10	2	3	5	12	19	−7	9		1–2	0–2	1–1	1–0	3–1	

Updated to match(es) played on 2024. Source: FPF
Legend: Blue = home team win; Yellow = draw; Red = away team win.
(P) Promoted

== Play-offs ==
=== Bracket ===
Quarter-finals
3A	Santos	2
2B	Academia Cantolao	1
2A	Deportivo Llacuabamba	0
3B	Comerciantes	1

Semi-finals
1A	Alianza Universidad	2	3	5
3A	Santos	1	0	1
1B	Juan Pablo II College	0	2	2 (4)
3B	Comerciantes	1	1	2 (3)

Final
1A	Alianza Universidad	1
1B	Juan Pablo II College	0

=== Quarter-finals ===
4 October 2024
15:00

Academia Cantolao	1–2	Santos
Fernando López 90+4' (pen.)		Josuee Herrera 71' (pen.); Gustavo Pereira 84'

Estadio Iván Elías Moreno, Lima
Referee: Edwin Ordónez
5 October 2024
15:00

Deportivo Llacuabamba	0–1	Comerciantes
		Diego Saffadi 90+4'

Estadio Municipal de Huamachuco, Huamachuco
Referee: Michael Espinoza

=== Semi-finals ===
==== First leg ====
9 October 2024
13:00

Santos	1–2	Alianza Universidad
Luis Trujillo 66'		Jorginho Sernaqué 18'; Camilo Rodríguez 25'

Estadio Municipal de Nasca, Nazca
Referee: Michael Espinoza
9 October 2024
15:15

Comerciantes	1–0	Juan Pablo II College
Maximiliano Lemos 17'

Estadio Max Augustín, Iquitos
Referee: Kevin Ortega

==== Second leg ====
13 October 2024
12:45

Alianza Universidad	3–0	Santos
Ibargüen 29'; Samudio 45+4'; Leguía 52'

Estadio Heraclio Tapia, Huánuco
Referee: Joel Alarcón
13 October 2024
15:15

Juan Pablo II College	2–1	Comerciantes
Facundo Rodríguez 18'; Nahuel Rodríguez 49'		Junior Zambrano 53'
Penalties
Romario Aliaga (penalty scored); Jack Durán (penalty scored); Facundo Rodríguez (penalty scored); Jorge Agüero (penalty missed); Gustavo Collante (penalty scored)	4–3	Adrian Quiroz (penalty scored); Piero Vela (penalty scored); Kevin Lugo (penalty missed); Leonardo Salas (penalty missed); Diego Saffadi (penalty scored)

Estadio Municipal de la Juventud, Chongoyape
Referee: Edwin Ordoñez

=== Final ===
20 October 2024
14:00

Alianza Universidad	1–0	Juan Pablo II College
Yamir Oliva 90'

Estadio Iván Elías Moreno, Lima
Referee: Bruno Pérez

== Grupo Descenso ==
=== Standings ===
Pos	Team	Pld	W	D	L	GF	GA	GD	Pts		BIN	UCV	USM	STE
1	Binacional (P)	6	3	3	0	9	2	+7	12	Reinstated to 2025 Liga 1		2–1	0–0	5–1
2	UCV Moquegua	6	3	2	1	15	4	+11	9 (Note: UCV Moquegua was docked a total of 2 points (Resolution N°123-CL-FPF-2024 and N°059-TL-FPF-2024).)		0–0		1–1	6–1
3	Universidad San Martín	6	2	3	1	4	5	−1	9		0–0	0–3		1–0
4	Carlos Stein (R)	6	0	0	6	3	20	−17	−2 (Note: Carlos Stein was docked a total of 2 points (Resolution N°126-CL-FPF-2024).)	Relegation to 2025 Liga 3	0–2	0–4	1–2	

Updated to match(es) played on 7 September 2024. Source:
Legend: Blue = home team win; Yellow = draw; Red = away team win.
(P) Promoted; (R) Relegated

== Top scorers ==
Rank	Player	Club	Goals
1	(Uruguay) Mathías López	Academia Cantolao	16
2	(Peru) Yoffre Vásquez	San Marcos	13
3	(Peru) Junior Zambrano	Comerciantes	11
3	(Peru) Josuee Herrera	Santos	11
4	(Peru) Kelvin Sánchez	Deportivo Llacuabamba	10

== See also ==
- 2024 Liga 1
- 2024 Copa Perú
- 2024 Ligas Departamentales del Perú
- 2024 Liga Femenina
- 2024 Torneo de Promoción y Reserva
