= Erick Torres =

Erick Torres may refer to:

- Erick Torres (footballer, born 1975), Peruvian footballer
- Erick Torres (footballer, born 1993), Mexican forward
- Erick Torres (footballer, born 2001), Peruvian footballer
- Erick Torres (baseball) (born 2004), Dominican baseball outfielder
