= Jaime Serna =

Peruvian association football manager

Personal information
- Full name: Jaime César Santiago Serna Mozombite
- Date of birth: 5 May 1985 (age 41)
- Place of birth: Lima, Peru

Managerial career
- Years: Team
- 2015–2016: UTC (assistant)
- 2017: Carlos A. Mannucci (assistant)
- 2019: Real Garcilaso (assistant)
- 2019–2020: Puebla (assistant)
- 2021–2022: Cruz Azul (assistant)
- 2022–2023: Peru (assistant)
- 2022–2023: Peru U20
- 2024–2026: Deportivo Moquegua

Jaime César Santiago Serna Mozombite (born 5 May 1985) is a Peruvian football manager.

== Career ==
Born in Lima, Serna began his career as a youth coordinator at Universidad Técnica de Cajamarca, before becoming an assistant of Rafael Castillo in 2015. He followed Castillo to Carlos A. Mannucci under the same role in 2017, before joining the staff of Juan Reynoso in 2019, at Real Garcilaso.

Serna continued to work as Reynoso's assistant at Puebla and Cruz Azul in Mexico, before joining the Peru national team in August 2022, under the same role. On 19 October of that year, he was appointed manager of the under-20 team.

Serna was replaced by José del Solar after the 2023 South American U-20 Championship, and returned to work as Reynoso's assistant in the full side. On 5 June 2024, he was presented as manager of UCV Moquegua in the Liga 2.

After avoiding relegation, Serna remained in charge of the club (now named Deportivo Moquegua) for the 2025 campaign, and led the club to a first-ever promotion to the Liga 1. On 29 November 2025, he renewed his contract for a further year.

On 12 October 2026, Serna was sacked from Moquegua.
