= Rauker FC =

- Full name: Rauker Fútbol Club Callería
- Nicknames: La furia fucsia El poderoso de la Palma
- Founded: October 26, 2022; 3 years ago
- Ground: Estadio Aliardo Soria Pérez
- Capacity: 25,848
- Chairman: Raúl Paredes Gama
- Manager: Efraín Larico
- League: Copa Perú

Rauker Fútbol Club Callería, commonly known as Rauker FC, is a Peruvian football based in the district of Callería in the city of Pucallpa. The club was founded in 2022 and competes in the Copa Perú.

== History ==
Rauker FC was founded on 26 October 2022. The club began competing in the Liga Distrital de Callería.

In 2024, Rauker won the Liga Distrital de Callería for the first time and later the Liga Provincial Coronel Portillo and then Liga Departamental de Ucayali, qualifying for the 2024 Copa Perú. The club placed 13th in the National Stage, advancing to the knockout stage, where they were eliminated by Club Deportivo El Inca in the Round of 32. As a result, for being the best placed team from Ucayali, Rauker were promoted to the Liga 3.

In the 2025 Liga 3, Rauker was disqualified and relegated to the 2026 Copa Perú after accumulating two walkovers (Matchdays 2 and 3).

== Stadium ==
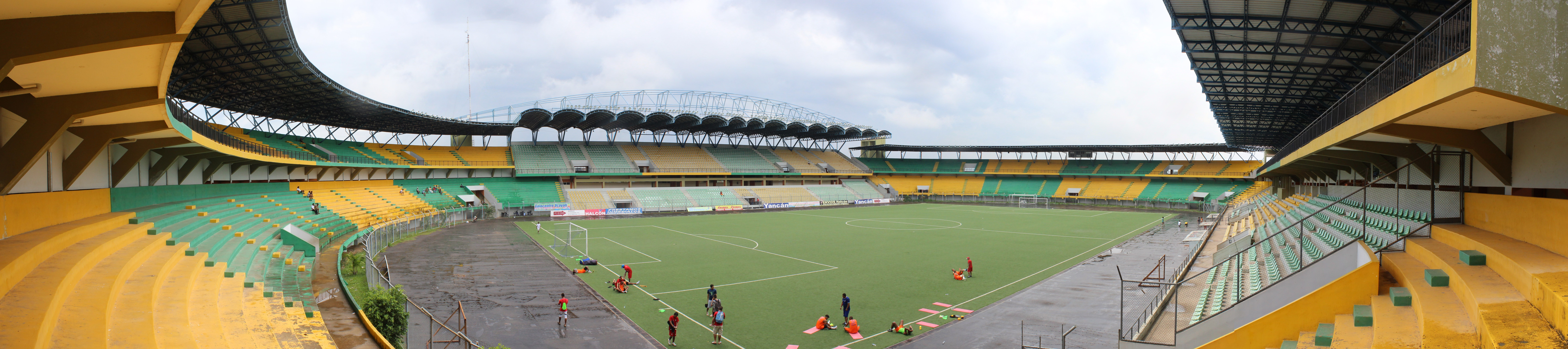
Estadio Aliardo Soria Pérez

Rauker's home stadium is the Estadio Aliardo Soria Pérez located in Pucallpa. The stadium was built in 1997 and has a capacity of 25,848. It is the largest stadium in the Peruvian Amazon region.

== Honours ==
=== Senior titles ===
Keys

- Record
- ^{(s)} Shared record

Type	Competition	Titles	Runner-up	Winning years	Runner-up years
Regional (League)	Liga Departamental de Ucayali	1	—	2024	—
Regional (League)	Liga Provincial de Coronel Portillo	1	—	2024	—
Regional (League)	Liga Distrital de Callería	1	—	2024	—

== See also ==
- List of football clubs in Peru
- Peruvian football league system
