= Juventud Santo Domingo =

- Full name: Asociación Club Social Deportivo Juventud Santo Domingo
- Nickname: La Rosada
- Founded: 13 August 2009; 16 years ago
- Ground: Estadio Municipal de Nasca
- Capacity: 10,000
- Chairman: Jorge Luis Bravo Oscco
- Manager: Ronny Revollar
- League: Liga 3
Home colours	Away colours

Juventud Santo Domingo is a Peruvian football club, playing in the city of Nazca. The club currently participates in the Peruvian Tercera División, the third tier of the Peruvian football league system.

== History ==
In the 2024 Copa Perú, the club advanced to the national stage but was eliminated by Bentin Tacna Heroica in the semifinals. However, the club qualified for the new 2025 Liga 3.

== Honours ==
=== Senior titles ===
Keys

- Record
- ^{(s)} Shared record

Type	Competition	Titles	Runner-up	Winning years	Runner-up years
Regional (League)	Liga Departamental de Ica	1	—	2024	—
Regional (League)	Liga Provincial de Nasca	1	—	2024	—
Regional (League)	Liga Distrital de Nasca	2	1	2023, 2024	2022

== See also ==
- List of football clubs in Peru
- Peruvian football league system
