= Unión Deportivo Ascensión =

Peruvian football club

- Full name: Club Unión Deportivo Ascensión
- Nickname(s): Weccas
- Founded: July 18, 1959
- Ground: IPD de Huancavelica, Huancavelica
- Capacity: 8,500
- Manager: José Tembladera
- League: Liga 3
- 2024: Copa Perú, 38th (Promoted)
Home colours	Away colours

Unión Deportivo Ascensión is a Peruvian football club, located in the city of Huancavelica, Peru. The club is the largest in Ascensión city and one of the largest in Huancavelica Province. The club was founded in 1959 and plays in the Liga 3, the third tier of Peruvian football.

== History ==
The club was founded July 18, 1959 in the city of Ascensión in the Department of Huancavelica.

In the 1980 Copa Perú, the club qualified to the Regional Stage, but was eliminated by and Miguel Grau and Atlético Centenario.

In the 2002 Copa Perú, the club qualified to the National Stage but was eliminated by León de Huánuco in the quarterfinals.

In the 2010 Copa Perú, the club qualified to the Regional Stage, but was eliminated by and Cultural Joe Gutiérrez and Froebel Deportes.

In the 2024 Copa Perú, UDA placed 38th in the national stage and was the best ranked team of the Huancavelica department, gaining promotion to the Peruvian Tercera División (Liga 3).

== Honours ==
=== Senior titles ===
Keys

- Record
- ^{(s)} Shared record

Type	Competition	Titles	Runner-up	Winning years	Runner-up years
Regional (League)	Región V	1	—	2002	—
Regional (League)	Liga Departamental de Huancavelica	12	2	1967, 1968, 1969, 1977, 1978, 1989, 2002, 2015, 2016, 2018, 2019, 2024	2010, 2012
Regional (League)	Liga Provincial de Huancavelica	8	3	1967, 1968, 1969, 2002, 2012, 2015, 2016, 2018	2010, 2017, 2024
Regional (League)	Liga Distrital de Ascensión	10	—	2009, 2010, 2012, 2013, 2014, 2015, 2016, 2017, 2018, 2024	—

== See also ==
- List of football clubs in Peru
- Peruvian football league system
