= Juventud Cautivo =

- Full name: Club Deportivo Juventud Cautivo
- Founded: October 12, 1978
- Ground: Estadio Municipal, San Miguel de El Faique
- League: Copa Perú
Home colours

Club Deportivo Juventud Cautivo (sometimes referred as Juventud Cautivo) is a Peruvian football club, playing in the city of San Miguel de El Faique, Huancabamba, Piura, Peru.

== History ==
The Club Deportivo Juventud Cautivo was founded on October 12, 1978.

In the 2019 Copa Perú, the club qualified to the Departamental Stage, but was eliminated by Sport Chorrillos de Querecotillo in the Semifinals.

In the 2021 Copa Perú, the club qualified to the Regional Stage, but was eliminated by UDP in the Fase 1.

In the 2022 Copa Perú, the club qualified to the Departamental Stage, but was eliminated by Defensor La Bocana in the Semifinals.

== Honours ==
=== Senior titles ===
Keys

- Record
- ^{(s)} Shared record

Type	Competition	Titles	Runner-up	Winning years	Runner-up years
Regional (League)	Liga Departamental de Piura	1	—	2024	—
Regional (League)	Liga Superior de Piura	1	1	2019	2018
Regional (League)	Liga Provincial de Huancabamba	1	2	2024	2017, 2022
Regional (League)	Liga Distrital de San Miguel de El Faique	2	—	2022, 2024	—

== See also ==
- List of football clubs in Peru
- Peruvian football league system
