= Josuee Herrera =

Peruvian footballer (born 1999)

Personal information
- Full name: Josuee Jesús Herrera Taber
- Date of birth: 4 February 1999 (age 27)
- Place of birth: Ica, Peru
- Height: 1.70 m (5 ft 7 in)
- Position: Winger

Team information
- Current team: Comerciantes Unidos
- Number: 11

Youth career
- 2017–2018: Universidad San Martín

Senior career*
| Years | Team | Apps | (Gls) |
| 2018–2020 | Sport Boys | 30 | (2) |
| 2021 | Unión Comercio | 12 | (0) |
| 2022–2024 | Santos de Nasca | 64 | (18) |
| 2025 | Sport Huancayo | 27 | (2) |
| 2026-act. | Comerciantes Unidos | 26 | (3) |
- * Club domestic league appearances and goals as of 29 December 2025

Josuee Jesús Herrera Taber (born 2 February 1999) is a Peruvian footballer who plays as a winger for Comerciantes Unidos.

== Career ==
=== Club career ===
18-year old Herrera moved to Sport Boys from Universidad San Martín in 2018 and scored in his first game for the club's reserve team in February 2018, one day after his 19th birthday, against the reserve team of Real Garcilaso.

Herrera got his professional debut for Sport Boys on 20 August 2018 against Sport Rosario. Herrera was in the line up, but was replaced in the half time. He made a total of six appearances in the Peruvian Primera División and scored one goal in the 2018 season.

He was promoted permanently in to the first team squad ahead of the 2019 season. In December 2019, Herrera revealed that they had been interest from FBC Melgar, but he wanted to stay at Sport Boys at least until his contract expired in 2021. Herrera ended the 2019 season with 16 games and one goal in the Peruvian Primera División. In the beginning of the 2020 season, he got injured.

In February 2021, Herrera joined Peruvian Segunda División side Unión Comercio. He left the club at the end of the year. Ahead of the 2022 season, Herrera joined Santos de Nasca.

Ahead of the 2025 season, Herrera joined Peruvian Primera División side Sport Huancayo.
