= Centro Social Pariacoto =

- Full name: Club Deportivo Centro Social de Pariacoto
- Nickname: Vendaval del valle del Río Grande
- Founded: February 5, 1961; 65 years ago
- Ground: Estadio Municipal, Casma
- Chairman: Jorge Valverde Cueva
- Manager: Barnaby Llosa
- League: Copa Perú
Home colours	Away colours

Club Deportivo Centro Social de Pariacoto (sometimes referred as Centro Social Pariacoto) is a Peruvian football club, playing in the city of Pariacoto, Áncash, Peru. The club currently participates in the Peruvian Tercera División, the third tier of Peruvian football.

== History ==
The Centro Social Pariacoto was founded on February 5, 1961.

In the 2011 Copa Perú, the club qualified to the Provincial Stage, but was eliminated by Defensor Porteño in the semifinals.

In the 2022 Copa Perú, the club qualified to the 2022 Liga Departamental de Áncash, but was eliminated by San Andrés de Runtu in the first stage.

In the 2023 Copa Perú, the club qualified to the 2023 Liga Departamental de Áncash, but was eliminated by San Marcos in the semifinals.

=== Liga 3 ===
In the inaugural 2025 Liga 3 season, the club was placed in Group 2 of the regional stage. Its debut at the semi-professional level did not go as expected, as it was scheduled to face Unión Huaral away from home in the opening round; however, due to the lack of player accreditation cards, the match could not be officially played and the team lost by walkover.

Despite this difficult start, the club managed to recover and compete normally in the remainder of the tournament. Its first victory came in the third round, with a 3–1 away win over Juventud Santo Domingo. Nevertheless, the campaign proved to be inconsistent, with several heavy defeats both at home and away, including a 5–1 loss to Alianza Lima Reserves at home, as well as 5–1 and 4–0 away defeats against Deportivo Municipal and Alianza Lima Reserves, respectively. The team also dropped important points on home soil.

Even so, the club managed to bounce back in the final stretch of the competition to avoid the relegation zone, earning key victories over Amazon Callao, Estudiantil CNI, and a 3–0 revenge win against Deportivo Municipal. Ultimately, the team finished seventh in its group and failed to advance to the next stage.

In May 2026, Centro Social Pariacoto officially announced that it would come under the administration of the traditional club José Gálvez of Chimbote, in accordance with the strategic guidelines agreed upon by both institutions. As part of this process, the club will adopt the name Centro Gálvez Pariacoto.

== Honours ==
=== Senior titles ===
Keys

- Record
- ^{(s)} Shared record

Type	Competition	Titles	Runner-up	Winning years	Runner-up years
Regional (League)	Liga Departamental de Áncash	1	—	2024	—
Regional (League)	Liga Provincial de Casma	1	2	2023	2022, 2024
Regional (League)	Liga Distrital de Pariacoto	4	1	2011, 2014, 2022, 2024	2023

== See also ==
- List of football clubs in Peru
- Peruvian football league system
