= Segundo Quiroz =

Peruvian politician (born 1964)

Member of the Congress of the Republic of Peru
- In office 27 July 2021 – 26 July 2026
- Constituency: Cajamarca

Personal details
- Born: Segundo Teodomiro Quiroz Barboza; October 9, 1964 (age 61) Chota Province, Peru
- Party: Alliance for Progress (since 2024)
- Other political affiliations: Free Peru (2021–2024)
- Education: Saint Albert Magnus University
- Occupation: Lawyer, teacher, politician

Segundo Teodomiro Quiroz Barboza (born 9 October 1964) is a Peruvian lawyer, teacher, and politician. He currently serves as a Member of the Congress of the Republic of Peru for the 2021–2026 term, representing the Cajamarca Department.

== Biography ==
Born in Chota, he studied law and political science at the Saint Albert Magnus University. He worked as a teacher in his home region before entering politics. In the 2021 general elections, he was elected to Congress under the Free Peru (Perú Libre) party. During his parliamentary tenure, he served as the Chairman of the Energy and Mines Commission (2023–2024). In 2024, he left the Free Peru caucus and joined the Alliance for Progress parliamentary group.
