= Real Independiente =

- Full name: Asociación Club Deportivo Real Independiente
- Nickname(s): León Blanco; La I
- Founded: October 12, 1928; 96 years ago
- Ground: Estadio Marcial Villanueva Marcos, Santa María
- League: Copa Perú
Home colours	Away colours

Asociación Club Deportivo Real Independiente (sometimes referred as Real Independiente) is a Peruvian football club, playing in the city of Santa María, Huaura, Peru.

== History ==
The Club Real Independiente was founded on 12 October 1928. Its first president was Delfín Nicho.

In the 1985 Copa Perú, the club qualified to the Departamental Stage, but was eliminated by Bella Esperanza in the final.

In the 2004 Copa Perú, the club qualified to the Departamental Stage, but was eliminated by Academia Daniel Ruiz in the first stage.

In the 2011 Copa Perú, the club qualified to the Provincial Stage, but was eliminated by Pedro Anselmo Bazalar in the first stage.

== Honours ==
=== Regional ===
- Liga Departamental de Lima:

Winners (1): 2024
Runner-up (1): 1985

- Liga Provincial de Huaura:

Winners (3): 1985, 2004, 2024.

- Liga Distrital de Santa María:

Winners (13): 1980, 1981, 1983, 1984, 1985, 1990, 2001, 2002, 2003, 2004, 2006, 2007, 2024

== See also ==
- List of football clubs in Peru
- Peruvian football league system
