= Erick Torres (footballer, born 2001) =

Peruvian footballer

Personal information
- Full name: Erick Alexandro Torres Leyva
- Date of birth: 16 February 2001 (age 25)
- Place of birth: Trujillo, Peru
- Height: 1.70 m (5 ft 7 in)
- Position: Winger

Team information
- Current team: Deportivo El Inca
- Number: 26

Youth career
- César Vallejo
- Carlos A. Mannucci

Senior career*
Years	Team	Apps	(Gls)
2019–2020	Carlos A. Mannucci	2	(0)
2021	Deportivo Llacuabamba	16	(0)
2022	Comerciantes Unidos	8	(1)
2023	Racing de Huamachuco		
2023	Defensor Porvenir		
2024–	Deportivo El Inca		
- * Club domestic league appearances and goals as of 18:08, 18 October 2022 (UTC)

Erick Alexandro Torres Leyva (born 16 February 2001) is a Peruvian footballer who plays as a winger for Deportivo El Inca.

== Career ==
=== Club career ===
Torres got his professional debut for Carlos A. Mannucci in the Peruvian Primera División on 14 April 2019 against Alianza Universidad. Torres was in the starting lineup but was replaced by Relly Fernández after 51 minutes. His second appearances came 13 days later against Sport Huancayo.

In the summer 2021, Torres joined Deportivo Llacuabamba. In February 2022, Torres moved to fellow league club Comerciantes Unidos.

In 2023, he moved to Racing de Huamachuco and later to Defensor Porvenir. In 2024, he joined Deportivo El Inca.
