= San Miguel de El Faique District =

Coordinates: 5.4019°S 79.6062°W

San Miguel de El Faique
- District
- Interactive map of San Miguel de El Faique
- Country: Peru
- Region: Piura
- Province: Huancabamba
- Founded: January 29, 1965
- Capital: San Miguel de El Faique

Government
  - Mayor: Leoncio Gumercindo Huaman Jimenez

Area
  - Total: 201.6 km^{2} (77.8 sq mi)
- Elevation: 1,050 m (3,440 ft)

Population (2005 census)
  - Total: 9,430
  - Density: 46.8/km^{2} (121/sq mi)
- Time zone: UTC-5 (PET)
- UBIGEO: 200306

San Miguel de El Faique District is one of eight districts of the province Huancabamba in Peru.
