= Santa María District, Huaura =

Coordinates: 11°05′30″S 77°34′23″W

Santa María District
- District
- Interactive map of Santa María District
- Country: Peru
- Region: Lima
- Province: Huaura
- Founded: December 6, 1918
- Capital: Cruz Blanca

Government
  - Mayor: Victor Enrique Zegarra Fernandez

Area
  - Total: 127.51 km^{2} (49.23 sq mi)
- Elevation: 75 m (246 ft)

Population (2005 census)
  - Total: 26,635
  - Density: 208.89/km^{2} (541.01/sq mi)
- Time zone: UTC-5 (PET)
- UBIGEO: 150810
- Website: munisantamaria.gob.pe

Santa María District is one of twelve districts of the province Huaura in Peru.
