= 2022 Ligas Departamentales del Peru =

Ligas Departamentales del Peru
- Season: 2022

The 2022 Ligas Departamentales, the fifth division of Peruvian football (soccer), were played by variable number teams by Departament. The champions and runners-up of each department qualified for the national stage of the 2022 Copa Perú.

== Liga Departamental de Amazonas ==
=== First stage ===
Team 1	Agg.	Team 2	1st leg	2nd leg
Defensor Mariscal Benavides	4–4 (6–5 p)	Unión Comercial	2–2	2–2
Deportivo Municipal (Jazán)	3–5	Sachapuyos	1–1	2–4
2 de Mayo (La Peca)	2–4	Bagua Grande	2–1	0–3
Unión Vencedores	7–1	Alfonso Ugarte (La Peca)	5–1	2–0
Unión Santo Domingo	9–4	Deportivo Amazonas	6–1	3–3

=== Second stage ===
Team 1	Agg.	Team 2	1st leg	2nd leg
Defensor Mariscal Benavides	2–3	Unión Santo Domingo	1–1	1–2
Sachapuyos	7–2	2 de Mayo (La Peca)	6–2	1–0
Bagua Grande	5–3	Unión Comercial	2–0	3–3
Deportivo Municipal (Jazán)	1–6	Unión Vencedores	1–2	0–4

=== Semifinals ===
Team 1	Agg.	Team 2	1st leg	2nd leg
Unión Santo Domingo	3–2	Sachapuyos	3–0	0–2
Bagua Grande	3–2	Unión Vencedores	2–2	1–0

=== Finals ===
Team 1	Agg.	Team 2	1st leg	2nd leg
Unión Santo Domingo	3–4	Bagua Grande	1–2	2–2

== Liga Departamental de Áncash ==
=== First stage ===
Team 1	Agg.	Team 2	1st leg	2nd leg
San Andrés de Runtu	4–3	Centro Social Pariacoto	2–1	2–2
Atlético Dandys	5–3	Los Gremios de Huanchac	2–1	3–2
Sport Áncash	4–2	Huracán del Norte	2–1	2–1
Los Líderes de Fundo Aco	2–3	Huracán (Toma)	2–0	0–3
Juventud Santa Rosa	0–25	Unión Juventud	0–3	0–22
Alianza Santa Cruz	4–8	Estrella Roja de Shumay	2–3	2–5
Atlético Bruces	10–3	Defensor Ullucurán	6–0	4–3
Sport Juvenil Sipza	3–3 (17–16 p)	Primavera	2–2	1–1
San Juan Bautista Matac	1–2	Rosario	0–0	1–2
Juventud Chingalpo	3–3 (6–5 p)	Once Amigos	2–0	1–3
Unión Circulo Ura Barrio	6–2	San Antonio de Padua	5–0	1–2
Sport Huaquilla	1–4	Cultural La Perla Negra	0–2	1–2

=== Second stage ===
Team 1	Agg.	Team 2	1st leg	2nd leg
San Andrés de Runtu	9–1	Atlético Dandys	7–0	2–1
Sport Áncash	8–0	Huracán (Toma)	5–0	3–0
Estrella Roja de Shumay	1–2	Unión Juventud	1–1	0–1
Atlético Bruces	16–2	Sport Juvenil Sipza	11–0	5–2
Juventud Chingalpo	2–3	Rosario	2–1	0–2
Cultural La Perla Negra	4–5	Unión Circulo Ura Barrio	3–2	1–3

=== Quarterfinals ===
Team 1	Agg.	Team 2	1st leg	2nd leg
San Andrés de Runtu	3–3 (8–7 p)	Sport Áncash	2–2	1–1
Unión Juventud	4–2	Cultural La Perla Negra	3–0	1–2
Rosario	1–12	Atlético Bruces	0–3	1–9
Estrella Roja de Shumay	3–2	Unión Circulo Ura Barrio	2–0	1–2

=== Semifinals ===
Team 1	Agg.	Team 2	1st leg	2nd leg
Estrella Roja de Shumay	1–4	Atlético Bruces	1–1	0–3
Unión Juventud	2–3	San Andrés de Runtu	2–0	0–3

=== Finals ===
Team 1	Agg.	Team 2	1st leg	2nd leg
Atlético Bruces	5–9	San Andrés de Runtu	3–3	2–6

== Liga Departamental de Apurímac ==
=== First stage ===
Team 1	Agg.	Team 2	1st leg	2nd leg
Social El Olivo	7–4	Hijos de Piscobamba	6–2	1–2
Florida	1–2	La Victoria	1–1	0–1
Andahuaylas	12–2	Halcones de Ayahuay	10–0	2–2
Barrio Alto	2–2 (1–3 p)	Argama FC	1–1	1–1
Récord Sulfubamba	0–2	Deportivo Auquiato	0–1	0–1
Señor de Huarquiza	1–3	Deportivo Municipal (Chuquibambilla)	1–1	0–2

=== Second stage ===
Team 1	Agg.	Team 2	1st leg	2nd leg
Social El Olivo	4–3	Argama FC	2–1	2–2
Andahuaylas	0–1	La Victoria	0–0	0–1
Virgen del Carmen (Ccochapata)	5–5 (5–6 p)	Deportivo Municipal (Chuquibambilla)	4–1	1–4
Deportivo Auquiato	5–1	Social Haquira	2–0	3–1

=== Semifinals ===
Team 1	Agg.	Team 2	1st leg	2nd leg
Deportivo Municipal (Chuquibambilla)	1–10	La Victoria	0–3	1–7
Social El Olivo	2–2 (8–7 p)	Deportivo Auquiato	1–1	1–1

=== Finals ===
Team 1	Agg.	Team 2	1st leg	2nd leg
Social El Olivo	3–5	La Victoria	1–1	2–4

== Liga Departamental de Arequipa ==
=== First stage ===
Team 1	Agg.	Team 2	1st leg	2nd leg
Deportivo Estrella	5–3	Rocket Boys	1–2	4–1
Juventud Apacroya	3–6	San Jacinto	1–2	2–4
UDC Cucho Capilla	1–8	Nacional	1–3	0–5
Jorge Chávez de Atico	1–5	Sporting Cristal (Uchumayo)	1–2	0–3
Deportivo Colón	3–2	San Juan de Chorunga	3–2	0–0
Los Tigres	3–3 (4–3 p)	Juventus Corazón	2–1	1–2

=== Second stage ===
Team 1	Agg.	Team 2	1st leg	2nd leg
Deportivo Estrella	1–0	Sporting Cristal (Uchumayo)	0–0	1–0
Deportivo Colón	2–3	San Jacinto	1–0	1–3
Nacional	2–3	Los Tigres	0–3	2–0

==== Tiebreaker ====
Team 1	Score	Team 2
Nacional	3–1	Deportivo Colón

=== Liguilla ===
Pos	Team	Pld	W	D	L	GF	GA	GD	Pts	Qualification or relegation
1	Nacional	6	3	3	0	14	5	+9	12	Advance to 2022 Copa Perú
2	Los Tigres	6	3	2	1	9	9	0	11	Advance to 2022 Copa Perú
3	Deportivo Estrella	6	0	4	2	5	8	−3	4	
4	San Jacinto	6	1	1	4	5	10	−5	4	

Rules for classification: 1) Points; 2) Goal difference; 3) Goals for; 4) Fair play points; 5) Drawing of lots.

== Liga Departamental de Ayacucho ==
=== First stage ===
Team 1	Agg.	Team 2	1st leg	2nd leg
Juventud Sol Naciente	3–3	Diamantes Kimbiri Alto	2–2	1–1
San José de Huarcaya	1–11	Player Villafuerte	1–2	0–9
Unión Lechemayo	6–1	San Agustín de Taca	3–1	3–0
Nueva Juventud Venecias Laguna	0–7	La Victoria de Pichari	0–2	0–5
Deportivo Fajardo	1–3	Sport Puma Pomacocha	1–1	0–2
Centro Unión Chilcayocc	1–10	Sport Cáceres	1–3	0–7
Sport Contreras	3–1	Juventud Miraflores	2–0	1–1
Mariscal de Chiquintirca	1–5	Social Cóndor	0–4	1–1
San Pedro de Chilcayocc	2–1	Real Calvario	1–0	1–1
Cultural Huracán	7–1	Renace de Cangallo	5–0	2–1

=== Second stage ===
Team 1	Agg.	Team 2	1st leg	2nd leg
Player Villafuerte	4–2	Diamantes Kimbiri Alto	3–0	1–2
Unión Lechemayo	3–5	La Victoria de Pichari	2–1	1–4
Sport Puma Pomacocha	0–1	Sport Cáceres	0–1	0–0
Sport Contreras	9–2	Social Cóndor	6–1	3–1
San Pedro de Chilcayocc	3–13	Cultural Huracán	1–2	2–11

=== Third stage ===
Team 1	Agg.	Team 2	1st leg	2nd leg
La Victoria de Pichari	3–4	Player Villafuerte	3–3	0–1
Sport Cáceres	5–4	Sport Contreras	3–1	2–3
Cultural Huracán	4–3	Unión Lechemayo	3–1	1–2

=== Semifinals ===
Team 1	Agg.	Team 2	1st leg	2nd leg
Player Villafuerte	1–4	Sport Cáceres	1–1	0–3
Cultural Huracán	5–2	Sport Contreras	1–0	4–2

=== Final ===
Team 1	Score	Team 2
Sport Cáceres	1–2	Cultural Huracán

== Liga Departamental de Cajamarca ==
=== First stage ===
Team 1	Agg.	Team 2	1st leg	2nd leg
El Rayo	1–13	Las Palmas	1–2	0–11
California	1–7	Cultural Volante	0–3	1–4
El Bosque	2–1	Colonia Tongodina	2–0	0–1
Deportivo Amallita	2–2 (4–5 p)	Familia Verástegui	2–1	0–1
Celendín FC	2–1	Juvenil UTC	2–0	0–1
25 de Abril	2–3	Dos de Mayo	1–2	1–1
San Ramón	–	Casa Blanca	1–5	–
Pedagógico	1–3	Rosario Celendín	0–2	1–1
Santiago Apostol	–	UDCH	–	–
Estudiantes Casanovistas	5–4	Galaxia	4–1	1–3
Señor Cautivo	2–2 (5–4 p)	Nuevo Tiempo	0–0	2–2

=== Second stage ===
Team 1	Agg.	Team 2	1st leg	2nd leg
San Ramón	0–3	Rosario Celendín	0–1	0–2
UDCH	1–4	Estudiantes Casanovistas	1–1	0–3
Deportivo Amallita	6–2	Señor Cautivo	5–0	1–2
Colonia Tongodina	1–6	Cultural Volante	1–1	0–5
Familia Verástegui	0–5	Las Palmas	0–0	0–5
Celendín FC	4–2	Dos de Mayo	3–0	1–2

=== Third stage ===
Team 1	Agg.	Team 2	1st leg	2nd leg
Estudiantes Casanovistas	1–2	Las Palmas	1–0	0–2
Deportivo Amallita	3–4	Rosario Celendín	2–1	1–2
Celendín FC	5–4	Cultural Volante	4–1	1–3

=== Semifinals ===
Team 1	Agg.	Team 2	1st leg	2nd leg
Las Palmas	3–3	Rosario Celendín	3–0	0–3
Cultural Volante	3–3	Celendín FC	3–0	0–3

== Liga Departamental del Callao ==
=== Group stage ===
==== Group A ====
Pos	Team	Pld	W	D	L	GF	GA	GD	Pts
1	Dan Las Lomas	4	2	1	1	10	3	+7	7
2	ADEBAMI	4	2	1	1	5	7	−2	7
3	Defensor Todos Unidos	4	1	2	1	2	2	0	5
4	Unión Progreso	3	0	2	1	3	5	−2	2
5	Unión Chalaca	3	0	2	1	0	3	−3	2

Rules for classification: 1) Points; 2) Goal difference; 3) Goals for; 4) Fair play points; 5) Drawing of lots.

==== Group B ====
Pos	Team	Pld	W	D	L	GF	GA	GD	Pts
1	Juvenud Palmeiras	3	2	0	1	5	3	+2	6
2	Zurgol	3	2	0	1	5	4	+1	6
3	Chalaca FC	3	1	1	1	4	3	+1	4
4	San Judas Tadeo	3	0	1	2	2	6	−4	1

Rules for classification: 1) Points; 2) Goal difference; 3) Goals for; 4) Fair play points; 5) Drawing of lots.

==== Group C ====
Pos	Team	Pld	W	D	L	GF	GA	GD	Pts
1	Estrella Azul	3	2	1	0	6	3	+3	7
2	Luis Escobar	3	2	0	1	4	1	+3	6
3	Atlético Chalaco	3	1	1	1	5	4	+1	4
4	José López Pazos	3	0	0	3	4	11	−7	0

Rules for classification: 1) Points; 2) Goal difference; 3) Goals for; 4) Fair play points; 5) Drawing of lots.

=== Semifinals ===
Team 1	Score	Team 2
Dan Las Lomas	0–2	Estrella Azul
Juventud Palmeiras	0–4	Luis Escobar

=== Final ===
Team 1	Score	Team 2
Estrella Azul	0–1	Luis Escobar

== Liga Departamental de Cusco ==
=== Group stage ===
==== Group A ====
Pos	Team	Pld	W	D	L	GF	GA	GD	Pts
1	Defensor Cubillas	6	5	0	1	14	1	+13	15
2	Racing Checacupe	6	4	0	2	7	6	+1	12
3	Defensor Agropecuario	6	2	0	4	8	11	−3	6
4	Wiñay Llaqta Kunturkanki	6	1	0	5	5	16	−11	3

Rules for classification: 1) Points; 2) Goal difference; 3) Goals for; 4) Fair play points; 5) Drawing of lots.

==== Group B ====
Pos	Team	Pld	W	D	L	GF	GA	GD	Pts
1	Independiente Ollantaytambo	6	3	3	0	12	4	+8	12
2	Defensor Cachimayo	6	3	1	2	10	6	+4	10
3	Deportivo Municipal (Quillabamba)	6	2	3	1	17	6	+11	9
4	UD Yaurisque	6	0	1	5	3	26	−23	1

Rules for classification: 1) Points; 2) Goal difference; 3) Goals for; 4) Fair play points; 5) Drawing of lots.

==== Group C ====
Pos	Team	Pld	W	D	L	GF	GA	GD	Pts
1	Pluma de Oro	6	4	0	2	10	4	+6	12
2	Defensor Yanatile	6	3	2	1	11	5	+6	11
3	Deportivo Municipal (Ccatca)	6	2	2	2	12	7	+5	8
4	Juventud Huaynapata	6	1	0	5	5	22	−17	3

Rules for classification: 1) Points; 2) Goal difference; 3) Goals for; 4) Fair play points; 5) Drawing of lots.

==== Group D ====
Pos	Team	Pld	W	D	L	GF	GA	GD	Pts
1	Deportivo Garcilaso	6	5	0	1	30	2	+28	15
2	AJI	6	5	0	1	16	4	+12	15
3	Virgen del Carmen	6	1	0	5	3	18	−15	3
4	Alianza Magistral	6	1	0	5	4	29	−25	3

Rules for classification: 1) Points; 2) Goal difference; 3) Goals for; 4) Fair play points; 5) Drawing of lots.

==== Group E ====
Pos	Team	Pld	W	D	L	GF	GA	GD	Pts
1	Manco II	6	5	0	1	13	4	+9	15
2	Real Cachimayo	6	4	1	1	26	6	+20	13
3	Sport Gómez	6	2	1	3	11	15	−4	7
4	Los Leones	6	0	0	6	4	29	−25	0

Rules for classification: 1) Points; 2) Goal difference; 3) Goals for; 4) Fair play points; 5) Drawing of lots.

==== Group F ====
Pos	Team	Pld	W	D	L	GF	GA	GD	Pts
1	Real Escorpión Safery	6	3	3	0	9	6	+3	12
2	Once Estrellas	6	2	2	2	6	10	−4	8
3	Atlético Sicuani	6	2	1	3	8	9	−1	7
4	Deportivo Municipal (Santo Tomas)	6	2	0	4	10	8	+2	6

Rules for classification: 1) Points; 2) Goal difference; 3) Goals for; 4) Fair play points; 5) Drawing of lots.

=== Quarterfinals ===
Team 1	Agg.	Team 2	1st leg	2nd leg
Independiente Ollantaytambo	3–5	Defensor Cubillas	3–3	0–2
Racing Checachupe	2–5	Pluma de Oro	1–1	1–4
Manco II	1–8	Deportivo Garcilaso	1–6	0–2
Atlético Sicuani	3–10	AJI	1–3	2–7

=== Semifinals ===
Team 1	Agg.	Team 2	1st leg	2nd leg
Defensor Cubillas	3–1	Pluma de Oro	2–0	1–1
Deportivo Garcilaso	2–1	AJI	2–0	0–1

=== Final ===
Team 1	Score	Team 2
Deportivo Garcilaso	4–0	Defensor Cubillas

== Liga Departamental de Huancavelica ==
=== First stage ===
Team 1	Agg.	Team 2	1st leg	2nd leg
Deportivo Vianney	2–2	Sport Anqara	1–2	1–0
Águilas de Cusicancha	0–8	UNH	–	0–8
FC Tambo	4–3	Estrella Central	1–1	3–2
Unión Huáncano	–	Juventud Huaytara	2–1	–
Sport Huáncano	–	San Juan Bautista	1–2	–

=== Group A ===
Pos	Team	Pld	W	D	L	GF	GA	GD	Pts
1	UNH	6	5	0	1	19	3	+16	15
2	Deportivo Vianney	6	4	0	2	20	6	+14	12
3	Sport Anqara	6	3	0	3	13	12	+1	9
4	FC Tambo	6	0	0	6	3	34	−31	0

Rules for classification: 1) Points; 2) Goal difference; 3) Goals for; 4) Fair play points; 5) Drawing of lots.

=== Group B ===
Team 1	Score	Team 2
Juventud Pampano (Huaytara)	1–2	Deportivo Palmeiras (Castrovirreyna)

=== Finals ===
Team 1	Agg.	Team 2	1st leg	2nd leg
UNH	0–1	Deportivo Vianney	0–1	0–0

== Liga Departamental de Huánuco ==
=== First stage ===
Team 1	Agg.	Team 2	1st leg	2nd leg
Deportivo Verdecocha	3–2	Social Molino	2–1	1–1
Juventud La Palma (Tocache)	8–4	UNAS	3–1	5–3
Señor de Mayo de Huancapata	7–4	Juventud Raymondina	3–4	4–0
Castle FC	8–3	Defensor Manchuria	3–1	5–2
Unión Brisas	2–2 (3–5 p)	Luis Cruzado	2–1	0–1
Sport Jaén	1–1 (6–7 p)	Once Leones de Cucho de Umari	1–0	0–1
Independiente San Luis	3–2	ADT Tashga	3–0	0–2
Atlético San Martín	2–2 (3–5 p)	León de Santa Rosa	2–0	0–2

=== Second stage ===
Team 1	Agg.	Team 2	1st leg	2nd leg
Independiente San Luis	1–2	Deportivo Verdecocha	1–2	0–0
Luis Cruzado	2–4	Juventud La Palma (Tocache)	1–2	1–2
Señor de Mayo de Huancapata	3–1	Once Leones de Cucho de Umari	2–1	1–0
León de Santa Rosa	1–3	Castle FC	0–2	1–1

=== Semifinals ===
Team 1	Agg.	Team 2	1st leg	2nd leg
Deportivo Verdecocha	3–1	Castle FC	1–0	2–1
Juventud La Palma (Tocache)	1–7	Señor de Mayo de Huancapata	1–0	0–7

=== Finals ===
Team 1	Agg.	Team 2	1st leg	2nd leg
Deportivo Verdecocha	0–0 (4–3 p)	Señor de Mayo de Huancapata	0–0	0–0

== Liga Departamental de Ica ==
=== First stage ===
Team 1	Agg.	Team 2	1st leg	2nd leg
Olímpico	3–3 (2–1 p)	Real Miraflores	0–0	3–3
Juventud Primavera	1–2	Unión San Martín	0–0	1–2
América de Palpa	3–3 (2–4 p)	San Pedro	2–1	1–2
Lolo Fernández	1–5	18 de Febrero	0–2	1–3
Octavio Espinosa	2–2 (3–5 p)	Cruz del Rosario	1–1	1–1
José Olaya	0–1	Los Libertadores	0–0	0–1

=== Second stage ===
Team 1	Agg.	Team 2	1st leg	2nd leg
Olímpico	3–1	San Pedro	2–1	1–0
Los Libertadores	2–1	18 de Febrero	0–1	2–0
Cruz del Rosario	1–0	América de Palpa	0–0	1–0
Real Miraflores	2–4	Unión San Martín	1–1	1–3

=== Semifinals ===
Team 1	Agg.	Team 2	1st leg	2nd leg
Unión San Martín	2–1	Olímpico	1–1	1–0
Los Libertadores	4–0	Cruz del Rosario	1–0	3–0

=== Final ===
Team 1	Score	Team 2
Unión San Martín	0–0 (3–2 p)	Los Libertadores

== Liga Departamental de Junín ==
=== Group stage ===
==== Group A ====
Pos	Team	Pld	W	D	L	GF	GA	GD	Pts
1	Alipio Ponce	3	2	1	0	9	3	+6	7
2	Racing Satipo	3	2	1	0	7	2	+5	7
3	Estudiantes Unidos	3	0	1	2	2	4	−2	1
4	Amigos de Curipata	3	0	1	2	1	10	−9	1

Rules for classification: 1) Points; 2) Goal difference; 3) Goals for; 4) Fair play points; 5) Drawing of lots.

==== Group B ====
Pos	Team	Pld	W	D	L	GF	GA	GD	Pts
1	Academia Municipal	3	2	1	0	10	3	+7	7
2	Unión Pichanaki	3	2	1	0	7	4	+3	7
3	Sport Municipal	3	1	0	2	5	4	+1	3
4	Sport Halcón	3	0	0	3	4	15	−11	0

Rules for classification: 1) Points; 2) Goal difference; 3) Goals for; 4) Fair play points; 5) Drawing of lots.

==== Group C ====
Pos	Team	Pld	W	D	L	GF	GA	GD	Pts
1	Santa Rosa PNP	3	2	1	0	7	1	+6	7
2	CESA	3	1	1	1	3	3	0	4
3	AFAR Shalom	3	0	3	0	3	3	0	3
4	Deportivo Berlin	3	0	1	2	2	8	−6	1

Rules for classification: 1) Points; 2) Goal difference; 3) Goals for; 4) Fair play points; 5) Drawing of lots.

==== Group D ====
Pos	Team	Pld	W	D	L	GF	GA	GD	Pts
1	Colegio San José	3	2	1	0	3	1	+2	7
2	Defensor Concepción	3	1	1	1	3	3	0	4
3	Deportivo Municipal (Chaquicocha)	3	1	1	1	2	2	0	4
4	AD Huamantanga	3	0	1	2	2	4	−2	1

Rules for classification: 1) Points; 2) Goal difference; 3) Goals for; 4) Fair play points; 5) Drawing of lots.

==== Group E ====
Pos	Team	Pld	W	D	L	GF	GA	GD	Pts
1	FBC Estrella	3	3	0	0	9	3	+6	9
2	Nueva Sociedad Chalampampa	3	1	1	1	3	5	−2	4
3	Porvenir Miraflores (Casacoto)	3	0	2	1	2	3	−1	2
4	Deportivo Municipal (Ahuaycha)	3	0	1	2	1	4	−3	1

Rules for classification: 1) Points; 2) Goal difference; 3) Goals for; 4) Fair play points; 5) Drawing of lots.

=== Second stage ===
==== Group A ====
Pos	Team	Pld	W	D	L	GF	GA	GD	Pts
1	Unión Pichanaki	3	2	1	0	5	1	+4	7
2	Alipio Ponce	3	2	0	1	11	3	+8	6
3	FBC Estrella	3	0	2	1	1	7	−6	2
4	AFAR Shalom	3	0	1	2	3	9	−6	1

Rules for classification: 1) Points; 2) Goal difference; 3) Goals for; 4) Fair play points; 5) Drawing of lots.

==== Group B ====
Pos	Team	Pld	W	D	L	GF	GA	GD	Pts
1	Santa Rosa PNP	3	2	1	0	4	0	+4	7
2	Defensor Concepción	3	2	1	0	4	1	+3	7
3	Racing Satipo	2	0	0	2	0	2	−2	0
4	Nueva Sociedad Chalampampa	2	0	0	2	1	6	−5	0

Rules for classification: 1) Points; 2) Goal difference; 3) Goals for; 4) Fair play points; 5) Drawing of lots.

==== Group C ====
Pos	Team	Pld	W	D	L	GF	GA	GD	Pts
1	CESA	3	2	1	0	4	1	+3	7
2	Colegio San José	3	1	2	0	4	2	+2	5
3	Academia Municipal	2	0	1	1	0	2	−2	1
4	Deportivo Municipal (Chaquicocha)	2	0	0	2	1	4	−3	0

Rules for classification: 1) Points; 2) Goal difference; 3) Goals for; 4) Fair play points; 5) Drawing of lots.

=== Liguilla ===
Pos	Team	Pld	W	D	L	GF	GA	GD	Pts	Qualification or relegation
1	CESA	3	2	1	0	4	2	+2	7	Advance to 2022 Copa Perú
2	Defensor Concepción	3	1	1	1	2	2	0	4	Advance to 2022 Copa Perú
3	Unión Pichanaki	3	0	2	1	3	4	−1	2	
4	Santa Rosa PNP	3	0	2	1	2	3	−1	2	

Rules for classification: 1) Points; 2) Goal difference; 3) Goals for; 4) Fair play points; 5) Drawing of lots.

== Liga Departamental de La Libertad ==
=== Zona Costa ===
==== Group A ====
Pos	Team	Pld	W	D	L	GF	GA	GD	Pts
1	Deportivo Nuevo Chao	6	3	3	0	10	6	+4	12
2	Real Alianza	6	3	2	1	18	9	+9	11
3	Ángel Avilés	6	1	3	2	13	13	0	6
4	El Rayo	6	0	2	4	6	19	−13	2

Rules for classification: 1) Points; 2) Goal difference; 3) Goals for; 4) Fair play points; 5) Drawing of lots.

==== Group B ====
Pos	Team	Pld	W	D	L	GF	GA	GD	Pts
1	Atlético Verdún	4	3	1	0	10	3	+7	10
2	Training Gol	4	1	1	2	14	6	+8	4
3	San Juan de Dios	4	1	0	3	5	19	−14	3

Rules for classification: 1) Points; 2) Goal difference; 3) Goals for; 4) Fair play points; 5) Drawing of lots.

==== Group C ====
Pos	Team	Pld	W	D	L	GF	GA	GD	Pts
1	Juventud Grau	4	3	0	1	7	3	+4	9
2	El Inca	4	3	0	1	8	5	+3	9
3	Deportivo Municipal (Pacanga)	4	0	0	4	2	9	−7	0

Rules for classification: 1) Points; 2) Goal difference; 3) Goals for; 4) Fair play points; 5) Drawing of lots.

===== Tiebreaker =====
Team 1	Score	Team 2
Juventud Grau	2–2 (3–2 p)	El Inca

==== Semifinals ====
Team 1	Agg.	Team 2	1st leg	2nd leg
Deportivo Nuevo Chao	0–7	Atlético Verdún	0–1	0–6
Real Alianza	3–1	Juventud Grau	0–1	3–0

=== Zona Ande ===
==== Group A ====
- Racing and Ciclón Santiaguino were disqualified for serious incidents and suspended for one year from the Copa Perú.

Pos	Team	Pld	W	D	L	GF	GA	GD	Pts
1	Ciclón Santiaguino	0	0	0	0	0	0	0	0
2	Racing	0	0	0	0	0	0	0	0

Rules for classification: 1) Points; 2) Goal difference; 3) Goals for; 4) Fair play points; 5) Drawing of lots.

==== Group B ====
Pos	Team	Pld	W	D	L	GF	GA	GD	Pts
1	Unión Pataz	2	1	1	0	2	1	+1	4
2	Real Sociedad	2	0	1	1	1	2	−1	1

Rules for classification: 1) Points; 2) Goal difference; 3) Goals for; 4) Fair play points; 5) Drawing of lots.

=== Liguilla ===
Pos	Team	Pld	W	D	L	GF	GA	GD	Pts	Qualification or relegation
1	Real Sociedad	6	4	1	1	9	4	+5	13	Advance to 2022 Copa Perú
2	Atlético Verdún	6	2	3	1	9	5	+4	9	Advance to 2022 Copa Perú
3	Real Alianza	6	2	1	3	10	9	+1	7	
4	Unión Pataz	6	1	1	4	4	14	−10	4	

Rules for classification: 1) Points; 2) Goal difference; 3) Goals for; 4) Fair play points; 5) Drawing of lots.

== Liga Departamental de Lambayeque ==
=== Group stage ===
==== Group A ====
Pos	Team	Pld	W	D	L	GF	GA	GD	Pts
1	Juventud La Joya	3	2	1	0	3	1	+2	7
2	Tres Marias	3	1	1	1	7	4	+3	4
3	Deportivo Lute	3	1	0	2	1	5	−4	3
4	Guillermo Aurich	3	0	2	1	4	5	−1	2

Rules for classification: 1) Points; 2) Goal difference; 3) Goals for; 4) Fair play points; 5) Drawing of lots.

==== Group B ====
Pos	Team	Pld	W	D	L	GF	GA	GD	Pts
1	Cruz de Chalpón	3	2	1	0	5	3	+2	7
2	Jorge Albujar	3	1	1	1	3	3	0	4
3	La Balsa	3	1	0	2	3	4	−1	3
4	Boca Juniors	3	0	2	1	1	2	−1	2

Rules for classification: 1) Points; 2) Goal difference; 3) Goals for; 4) Fair play points; 5) Drawing of lots.

==== Group C ====
Pos	Team	Pld	W	D	L	GF	GA	GD	Pts
1	Los Caimanes	3	2	1	0	5	1	+4	7
2	Nueva Esperanza	3	1	2	0	5	3	+2	5
3	JJ Arquitectura	3	0	2	1	2	3	−1	2
4	Estrella Roja	3	0	1	2	2	7	−5	1

Rules for classification: 1) Points; 2) Goal difference; 3) Goals for; 4) Fair play points; 5) Drawing of lots.

=== Quarterfinals ===
Team 1	Agg.	Team 2	1st leg	2nd leg
Deportivo Lute	1–1 (4–2 p)	Juventud La Joya	1–1	0–0
Cruz de Chalpón	2–2 (3–4 p)	Nueva Esperanza	1–0	1–2
La Balsa	2–1	Los Caimanes	1–1	1–0
Tres Marías	1–5	Jorge Albújar	0–4	1–1

=== Semifinals ===
Team 1	Agg.	Team 2	1st leg	2nd leg
Deportivo Lute	5–2	La Balsa	0–3	2–2
Jorge Albújar	0–2	Nueva Esperanza	0–1	0–1

=== Final ===
Team 1	Score	Team 2
La Balsa	0–2	Nueva Esperanza

== Liga Departamental de Lima ==
- A total of 16 teams competed in the tournament, which began on 10 July and ended on 14 August 2022.

=== Round of 16 ===
Team 1	Agg.	Team 2	1st leg	2nd leg
Huarochirí FC	2–3	Paz Soldán	1–2	1–1
José de San Martín	5–1	Sport Olivar	3–0	2–1
Barranco City	3–3 (5–4 p)	Maristas	2–1	1–2
Deportivo Casa Blanca	1–3	Unión Supe	1–0	0–3
Juventud 2001 Chancayllo	0–6	Walter Ormeño	0–1	0–5
Santa Rosa de Macas	0–10	Independiente San Felipe	0–6	0–4
Atlético Tingo María	4–5	Tito Drago	2–3	2–2
Miguel Grau	1–2	San Antonio	1–0	0–2

=== Quarterfinals ===
Team 1	Agg.	Team 2	1st leg	2nd leg
Barranco City	1–3	Paz Soldán	1–1	0–2
José de San Martín	3–2	Unión Supe	2–0	1–2
Tito Drago	1–1 (4–2 p)	Walter Ormeño	1–0	0–1
Independiente San Felipe	6–1	San Antonio	3–1	3–0

=== Semifinals ===
Team 1	Agg.	Team 2	1st leg	2nd leg
Paz Soldán	2–1	Tito Drago	0–0	2–1
Independiente San Felipe	2–1	José de San Martín	1–0	1–1

=== Finals ===
Team 1	Score	Team 2
Paz Soldán	0–0 (5–4 p)	Independiente San Felipe

== Liga Departamental de Loreto ==
=== Group stage ===
==== Group A ====
Pos	Team	Pld	W	D	L	GF	GA	GD	Pts
1	Tarapacá	2	0	2	0	3	3	0	2
2	Tecnológico	2	0	2	0	3	3	0	2
3	La Iquiteña	2	0	2	0	2	2	0	2

Rules for classification: 1) Points; 2) Goal difference; 3) Goals for; 4) Fair play points; 5) Drawing of lots.

==== Group B ====
Pos	Team	Pld	W	D	L	GF	GA	GD	Pts
1	Comerciantes	3	2	1	0	9	4	+5	7
2	Caballococha	3	1	1	1	7	8	−1	4
3	IPRESS	3	1	1	1	6	8	−2	4
4	San Roque	3	0	1	2	7	9	−2	1

Rules for classification: 1) Points; 2) Goal difference; 3) Goals for; 4) Fair play points; 5) Drawing of lots.

==== Group C ====
Pos	Team	Pld	W	D	L	GF	GA	GD	Pts
1	Estudiantil CNI	3	2	1	0	19	2	+17	7
2	Pedro del Castillo Ríos Ex 160	3	2	1	0	7	2	+5	7
3	Madre Tierra	2	0	0	2	2	7	−5	0
4	Industrial	2	0	0	2	2	19	−17	0

Rules for classification: 1) Points; 2) Goal difference; 3) Goals for; 4) Fair play points; 5) Drawing of lots.

===== Tiebreaker =====
Team 1	Score	Team 2
Estudiantil CNI	5–1	Pedro del Castillo Ríos Ex 160

==== Group D ====
Pos	Team	Pld	W	D	L	GF	GA	GD	Pts
1	Red de Salud	2	2	0	0	14	2	+12	6
2	Atletic Nauta	2	1	0	1	6	5	+1	3
3	Deportivo Awajún	2	0	0	2	1	14	−13	0

Rules for classification: 1) Points; 2) Goal difference; 3) Goals for; 4) Fair play points; 5) Drawing of lots.

=== Liguilla ===
Pos	Team	Pld	W	D	L	GF	GA	GD	Pts	Qualification or relegation
1	Estudiantil CNI	3	3	0	0	10	2	+8	9	Advance to 2022 Copa Perú
2	Comerciantes	3	2	0	1	6	5	+1	6	Advance to 2022 Copa Perú
3	Tecnológico	3	1	0	2	3	5	−2	3	
4	Red de Salud	3	0	0	3	2	9	−7	0	

Rules for classification: 1) Points; 2) Goal difference; 3) Goals for; 4) Fair play points; 5) Drawing of lots.

== Liga Departamental de Madre de Dios ==
=== Semifinals ===
Team 1	Agg.	Team 2	1st leg	2nd leg
Athletico Maldonado	2–4	Atlético Municipal Iñapari	0–3	2–1
Atlético Junior Huepetuhe	0–5	Deportivo Maldonado	0–0	0–5

=== Final ===
Team 1	Score	Team 2
Deportivo Maldonado	2–0	Atlético Municipal Iñapari

== Liga Departamental de Moquegua ==
=== Standing ===
Pos	Team	Pld	W	D	L	GF	GA	GD	Pts	Qualification or relegation
1	Credicoop San Cristóbal	8	6	1	1	8	3	+5	19	Advance to 2022 Copa Perú
2	Mariscal Nieto	8	4	2	2	17	8	+9	14	Advance to 2022 Copa Perú
3	Academia Ticsani	8	2	3	3	12	14	−2	9	
4	Juvenil Quele	8	3	0	5	13	20	−7	9	
5	Hijos del Altiplano y del Pacífico	8	1	2	5	4	9	−5	5	

Rules for classification: 1) Points; 2) Goal difference; 3) Goals for; 4) Fair play points; 5) Drawing of lots.

== Liga Departamental de Pasco ==
=== First stage ===
Pos	Team	Pld	W	D	L	GF	GA	GD	Pts
1	Deportivo Municipal (Yanahuanca)	2	1	1	0	5	1	+4	4
2	Ecosem Pasco	2	1	1	0	2	0	+2	4
3	Peñarol Huarautambo	2	1	0	1	1	1	0	3
4	Once Caldas	2	1	0	1	1	1	0	3
5	Social Constitución	2	0	1	1	0	2	−2	1
6	Academia Pepe	2	0	1	1	1	5	−4	1

Rules for classification: 1) Points; 2) Goal difference; 3) Goals for; 4) Fair play points; 5) Drawing of lots.

=== Semifinals ===
Team 1	Agg.	Team 2	1st leg	2nd leg
Once Caldas	3–2	Deportivo Municipal (Yanahuanca)	2–1	1–1
Peñarol Huarautambo	2–3	Ecosem Pasco	1–1	1–2

=== Finals ===
Team 1	Agg.	Team 2	1st leg	2nd leg
Once Caldas	0–3	Ecosem Pasco	0–2	0–1

== Liga Departamental de Piura ==
=== Group stage ===
==== Group A ====
Pos	Team	Pld	W	D	L	GF	GA	GD	Pts
1	Atlético Torino	4	3	1	0	11	3	+8	10
2	Estudiantes	3	0	2	1	4	7	−3	2
3	Cerritos	3	0	1	2	3	8	−5	1

Rules for classification: 1) Points; 2) Goal difference; 3) Goals for; 4) Fair play points; 5) Drawing of lots.

==== Group B ====
Pos	Team	Pld	W	D	L	GF	GA	GD	Pts
1	Defensor La Bocana	5	4	1	0	16	0	+16	13
2	Defensor Nuevo Catacaos	5	4	0	1	13	5	+8	12
3	Juan Noel (Note: Juan Noel were deducted three points.)	5	1	1	3	3	8	−5	1
4	Sport Fátima (Note: Sport Fátima were deducted nine points.)	5	0	0	5	1	20	−19	−9

Rules for classification: 1) Points; 2) Goal difference; 3) Goals for; 4) Fair play points; 5) Drawing of lots.

==== Group C ====
Pos	Team	Pld	W	D	L	GF	GA	GD	Pts
1	UDP	6	6	0	0	17	5	+12	18
2	Nueva Juventud	6	4	0	2	12	5	+7	12
3	Ramón Castilla	6	1	1	4	10	15	−5	4
4	Comunidad San Francisco (Note: Comunidad San Francisco were deducted nine points.)	6	0	1	5	5	19	−14	−8

Rules for classification: 1) Points; 2) Goal difference; 3) Goals for; 4) Fair play points; 5) Drawing of lots.

==== Group D ====
Pos	Team	Pld	W	D	L	GF	GA	GD	Pts
1	Juventud Cautivo	4	3	0	1	8	4	+4	9
2	Sport Chorrillos (Máncora)	4	3	0	1	7	1	+6	9
3	Rosario Central	4	0	0	4	3	13	−10	0

Rules for classification: 1) Points; 2) Goal difference; 3) Goals for; 4) Fair play points; 5) Drawing of lots.

===== Tiebreaker =====
Team 1	Score	Team 2
Sport Chorrillos (Máncora)	1–1 (6–7 p)	Juventud Cautivo

=== Semifinals ===
Team 1	Agg.	Team 2	1st leg	2nd leg
Atlético Torino	3–2	UDP	2–0	1–2
Juventud Cautivo	1–4	Defensor La Bocana	0–2	1–2

=== Finals ===
Team 1	Agg.	Team 2	1st leg	2nd leg
Defensor La Bocana	3–4	Atlético Torino	2–1	1–3

== Liga Departamental de Puno ==
- The club Fuerza Minera withdrew before the start of the tournament.

=== First stage ===
==== Group A ====
Pos	Team	Pld	W	D	L	GF	GA	GD	Pts
1	Deportivo Municipal (Sandia)	6	5	0	1	19	6	+13	15
2	Santos (Azángaro)	6	3	1	2	13	11	+2	10
3	Unión Progresista	6	2	2	2	11	9	+2	8
4	Diablos Rojos (Huatasani)	6	0	1	5	10	27	−17	1

Rules for classification: 1) Points; 2) Goal difference; 3) Goals for; 4) Fair play points; 5) Drawing of lots.

==== Group B ====
Pos	Team	Pld	W	D	L	GF	GA	GD	Pts
1	Minera Los Andes	6	5	0	1	17	9	+8	15
2	Milán Quira de Alto Inambri	6	4	0	2	14	4	+10	12
3	Deportivo Municipal (Macusani)	6	3	0	3	8	7	+1	9
4	FC Sacasco	6	0	0	6	3	22	−19	0

Rules for classification: 1) Points; 2) Goal difference; 3) Goals for; 4) Fair play points; 5) Drawing of lots.

==== Group C ====
Pos	Team	Pld	W	D	L	GF	GA	GD	Pts
1	FC Cahusiños	6	4	2	0	12	3	+9	14
2	Deportivo Municipal (Texas de Nuñoa)	6	3	2	1	10	4	+6	11
3	UDE Los Próceres	6	1	3	2	3	7	−4	6
4	Alianza Ilave	6	0	1	5	1	12	−11	1

Rules for classification: 1) Points; 2) Goal difference; 3) Goals for; 4) Fair play points; 5) Drawing of lots.

==== Group D ====
Pos	Team	Pld	W	D	L	GF	GA	GD	Pts
1	Policial Santa Rosa	6	4	0	2	9	7	+2	12
2	Deportivo Enciniano	6	3	1	2	8	8	0	10
3	Ángeles de Vizcachani	6	2	2	2	9	8	+1	8
4	Deportivo Municipal (Santa Rosa)	6	1	1	4	7	10	−3	4

Rules for classification: 1) Points; 2) Goal difference; 3) Goals for; 4) Fair play points; 5) Drawing of lots.

==== Group E ====
Pos	Team	Pld	W	D	L	GF	GA	GD	Pts
1	Deportivo Universitario	6	4	2	0	13	3	+10	14
2	San Sebastián	6	2	2	2	9	8	+1	8
3	Atlético Miraflores	6	1	3	2	7	9	−2	6
4	Termales Gold	6	1	1	4	5	14	−9	4

Rules for classification: 1) Points; 2) Goal difference; 3) Goals for; 4) Fair play points; 5) Drawing of lots.

=== Second stage ===
==== Group A ====
Pos	Team	Pld	W	D	L	GF	GA	GD	Pts
1	Deportivo Municipal (Sandia)	6	3	3	0	12	4	+8	12
2	Minera Los Andes	6	2	2	2	11	6	+5	8
3	Santos (Azángaro)	6	2	2	2	9	11	−2	8
4	Deportivo Municipal (Macusani)	6	1	1	4	4	15	−11	4

Rules for classification: 1) Points; 2) Goal difference; 3) Goals for; 4) Fair play points; 5) Drawing of lots.

==== Group B ====
Pos	Team	Pld	W	D	L	GF	GA	GD	Pts
1	FC Cahusiños	6	3	3	0	11	4	+7	12
2	Policial Santa Rosa	6	3	2	1	12	7	+5	11
3	Milán Quira de Alto Inambri	6	1	2	3	8	9	−1	5
4	Deportivo Municipal (Texas de Nuñoa)	6	0	3	3	4	15	−11	3

Rules for classification: 1) Points; 2) Goal difference; 3) Goals for; 4) Fair play points; 5) Drawing of lots.

==== Group C ====
Pos	Team	Pld	W	D	L	GF	GA	GD	Pts
1	Deportivo Universitario	6	5	1	0	21	5	+16	16
2	Deportivo Enciniano	6	4	1	1	15	7	+8	13
3	Unión Progresista	6	2	0	4	6	12	−6	6
4	San Sebastián	6	0	0	6	6	23	−17	0

Rules for classification: 1) Points; 2) Goal difference; 3) Goals for; 4) Fair play points; 5) Drawing of lots.

=== Semifinals ===
Team 1	Agg.	Team 2	1st leg	2nd leg
Deportivo Municipal (Sandia)	2–2 (2–4 p)	Deportivo Universitario	1–0	1–2
FC Cahusiños	2–0	Deportivo Enciniano	2–0	0–0

=== Final ===
Team 1	Score	Team 2
Deportivo Universitario	0–0 (2–4 p)	FC Cahusiños

== Liga Departamental de San Martín ==
=== First stage ===
==== Zona Norte ====
Team 1	Agg.	Team 2	1st leg	2nd leg
Atlético Awajun	3–2	Deportivo Ancochallo	2–1	1–1
Estudiantes de Ingeniería	4–7	Selva FC	0–4	4–3
Atlético Deportivo Tabalosos	1–5	AD Tahuishco	1–1	0–4

==== Zona Centro ====
Team 1	Agg.	Team 2	1st leg	2nd leg
Shuta Boys	10–0	Unión Santa Marta	7–0	3–0
Inter Winge	1–3	Independiente Morales	1–1	0–2
El Dorado	12–2	Asociación Técnica Comunal	8–1	4–1

==== Zona Sur ====
Team 1	Agg.	Team 2	1st leg	2nd leg
Unión Cuzco	2–2	Defensor Saposoa	1–0	1–2
San Martín Pajarillo	1–3	Academia CIMAC	1–1	0–2
Agua San Martín	3–0	Sport Loreto	2–0	1–0

=== Second stage ===
==== Zona Norte ====
Team 1	Agg.	Team 2	1st leg	2nd leg
Selva FC	3–3	AD Tahuishco	2–2	1–1
Estudiantes de Ingeniería	1–2	Atlético Awajun	1–1	0–1

==== Zona Centro ====
Team 1	Agg.	Team 2	1st leg	2nd leg
Shuta Boys	5–1	Inter Winge	4–1	1–0
El Dorado	4–5	Independiente Morales	3–0	1–5

==== Zona Sur ====
Team 1	Agg.	Team 2	1st leg	2nd leg
Unión Cuzco	3–3 (3–4 p)	Agua San Martín	1–0	2–3
Defensor Saposoa	2–7	Academia CIMAC	0–4	2–3

=== Third stage ===
Team 1	Agg.	Team 2	1st leg	2nd leg
Academia CIMAC	3–4	Independiente Morales	1–0	2–4
Shuta Boys	2–5	Selva FC	0–4	2–1
Agua San Martín	4–3	Atlético Awajun	2–0	2–3

==== Tiebreaker ====
Team 1	Score	Team 2
Atlético Awajun	1–5	Academia CIMAC

=== Semifinals ===
Team 1	Agg.	Team 2	1st leg	2nd leg
Agua San Martín	4–2	Independiente Morales	4–1	0–1
Academia CIMAC	6–2	Selva FC	3–1	3–1

== Liga Departamental de Tacna ==
- A total of 8 teams competed in the tournament, which began on 9 July and ended on 14 August 2022.

=== First stage ===
Team 1	Agg.	Team 2	1st leg	2nd leg
Juventud Locumba	1–7	Virgen de la Natividad	1–4	0–3
Coronel Bolognesi	4–0	Unión Mirave	3–0	1–0
Juventud Alba Roja	3–2	Águilas Melgar	1–1	2–1
Defensor Ticaco	4–2	Social Santa Cruz	3–2	1–0

=== Liguilla ===
Pos	Team	Pld	W	D	L	GF	GA	GD	Pts	Qualification or relegation
1	Virgen de la Natividad	5	5	0	0	16	1	+15	15	Advance to 2022 Copa Perú
2	Coronel Bolognesi	5	4	0	1	13	3	+10	12	Advance to 2022 Copa Perú
3	Juventud Alba Roja	5	3	0	2	10	10	0	9	
4	Águilas Melgar	5	2	0	3	8	9	−1	6	
5	Defensor Ticaco	5	1	0	4	2	11	−9	3	
6	Social Santa Cruz	5	0	0	5	2	17	−15	0	

Rules for classification: 1) Points; 2) Goal difference; 3) Goals for; 4) Fair play points; 5) Drawing of lots.

==== Second Place play-off ====
Team 1	Score	Team 2
Coronel Bolognesi	1–0	Juventud Alba Roja

== Liga Departamental de Tumbes ==
=== Standings ===
Pos	Team	Pld	W	D	L	GF	GA	GD	Pts	Qualification or relegation
1	Ferrocarril	5	3	2	0	9	5	+4	11	Advance to 2022 Copa Perú
2	Leoncio Prado	5	3	1	1	10	6	+4	10	Advance to 2022 Copa Perú
3	Sport Bolognesi	5	2	2	1	9	5	+4	8	
4	Renovación Cerro Blanco	5	2	1	2	10	7	+3	7	
5	Cerro Porteño	5	2	0	3	6	9	−3	6	
6	Sport Progresista	5	0	0	5	3	15	−12	0	

Rules for classification: 1) Points; 2) Goal difference; 3) Goals for; 4) Fair play points; 5) Drawing of lots.

== Liga Departamental de Ucayali ==
=== First stage ===
Team 1	Agg.	Team 2	1st leg	2nd leg
Comerciantes Unidos	1–8	Colegio Comercio	0–2	1–6
Defensor San Alejandro	2–6	Inter FC	1–2	1–4
Cocaleros	1–4	La Paz	0–3	1–1
San Antonio de Padua	2–3	Atlético Raimondi	2–1	0–2

=== Liguilla ===
Pos	Team	Pld	W	D	L	GF	GA	GD	Pts	Qualification or relegation
1	Colegio Comercio	3	2	1	0	9	2	+7	7	Advance to 2022 Copa Perú
2	La Paz	3	2	0	1	8	5	+3	6	Advance to 2022 Copa Perú
3	Inter FC	3	1	1	1	4	4	0	4	
4	Atlético Raimondi	3	0	0	3	2	12	−10	0	

Rules for classification: 1) Points; 2) Goal difference; 3) Goals for; 4) Fair play points; 5) Drawing of lots.
