= 2022 Copa Perú =

Copa Perú
- Season: 2022
- Champions: Deportivo Garcilaso (1st title)
- Promoted: Comerciantes; Deportivo Garcilaso
- Top goalscorer: (Peru) Raúl Tito (11)

The 2022 Peru Cup season (Spanish: Copa Perú 2022), the largest amateur tournament of Peruvian football. The Regional Stage (Spanish: Etapa Regional) started on 12 February, and the National Stage (Spanish: Etapa Nacional) started in November. The winner of the National Stage was promoted to the Liga 1 and the runner-up was promoted to the Liga 2.

The format used in this soccer competition was created by the Chilean Leandro A. Shara.

On 23 August 2022, it was announced that starting from 2023, the Copa Perú would only give promotion to Liga 2 due to the reforms of Peruvian football by the FPF, meaning that this Copa Perú edition was the last that awarded its winning team promotion to the Peruvian top flight.

== Team changes ==
Promoted to 2022 Liga 2	Promoted to 2022 Liga 1
▲ Alfonso Ugarte (2nd)	▲ADT (1st)

== Departmental stage ==
Departmental Stage: 2022 Ligas Departamentales del Peru

The following list shows the teams that qualified for the National Stage.

Department	Team	Location
Amazonas	Bagua Grande	Bagua Grande
Amazonas	Unión Santo Domingo	Chachapoyas
Ancash	San Andrés de Runtu	San Marcos
Ancash	Atlético Bruces	Nuevo Chimbote
Apurímac	La Victoria	Abancay
Apurímac	Social El Olivo	Abancay
Arequipa	Nacional	Mollendo
Arequipa	Los Tigres	Cayma
Ayacucho	Cultural Huracán	Huanta
Ayacucho	Sport Cáceres	Jesús Nazareno
Cajamarca	Cultural Volante	Bambamarca
Cajamarca	Rosario Celendín	Celendín
Callao	Estrella Azul	Ventanilla
Callao	Juventud Palmeiras	Ventanilla
Cusco	Deportivo Garcilaso	Cusco
Cusco	Defensor Cubillas	Yauri
Huancavelica	Deportivo Vianney	Ascensión
Huancavelica	UNH	Ascensión
Huánuco	Deportivo Verdecocha	La Unión
Huánuco	Señor de Mayo de Huancapata	Ambo
Ica	Unión San Martín	Pisco
Ica	Los Libertadores	San Clemente
Junín	CESA	San Agustín
Junín	Defensor Concepción	Concepción
La Libertad	Atlético Verdún	San José
La Libertad	Real Sociedad	Chugay

Department	Team	Location
Lambayeque	La Balsa	Pitipo
Lambayeque	Nueva Esperanza	Oyotún
Lima	Independiente San Felipe	Carabayllo
Lima	Paz Soldán	Aucallama
Loreto	Estudiantil CNI	Iquitos
Loreto	Comerciantes	Belén
Madre de Dios	Deportivo Maldonado	Tambopata
Madre de Dios	Atlético Municipal Iñapari	Iñapari
Moquegua	Credicoop San Cristóbal	Samegua
Moquegua	Mariscal Nieto	Ilo
Pasco	Ecosem Pasco	Tinyahuarco
Pasco	Once Caldas	Huariaca
Piura	Atlético Torino	Pariñas
Piura	Defensor La Bocana	Sechura
Puno	Deportivo Universitario	Puno
Puno	FC Cahusiños	San Román
San Martín	Agua San Martín	Saposoa
San Martín	Academia CIMAC	Bellavista
Tacna	Virgen de la Natividad	Tacna
Tacna	Coronel Bolognesi	Tacna
Tumbes	Ferrocarril	Zarumilla
Tumbes	Leoncio Prado	Pampas de Hospital
Ucayali	Colegio Comercio	Callería
Ucayali	La Paz	Tournavista

== National Stage ==
In 2022 the National Stage has grown to 50 teams, and the new National Stage, designed by matchVision, is played under Regional using the POT System, with all the Regions of Peru represented. The National Stage starts in the second week of September.

This phase features the 50 teams that qualified from the Departmental Stage. Each team plays 3 games at home and 3 games away, for a total of 6 games against 3 different geographical rivals. The departmental stage winners only play against departmental runners-up, and vice versa. All the teams are positioned in one general table. After 6 matches, the team in places 1 to 32 are qualified directly to the Round of 32. The teams in places 33 to 50 are eliminated.

The winner of the National Stage was promoted to the 2023 Liga 1 and the runner-up of the National Stage was promoted to the 2023 Liga 2.

=== Tie-breaking criteria ===
The ranking of teams in the Unique Table is based on the following criteria:
1. Number of Points
3. Goal difference
4. Number of goals scored
5. Better performance in away matches based on the following criteria:
1. Number of Away Points
3. Goal Difference in away games
4. Number of goals scored in away games
6. Number of First-Half points: considering the half-time results as the final results
7. Drawing of lots

=== League table ===
Pos	Team	Pld	W	D	L	GF	GA	GD	Pts	Qualification
1	Deportivo Garcilaso	6	5	0	1	15	4	+11	15	Round of 32
2	Social El Olivo	6	5	0	1	10	6	+4	15	Round of 32
3	Los Libertadores	6	4	2	0	13	4	+9	14	Round of 32
4	Atlético Bruces	6	4	1	1	15	9	+6	13	Round of 32
5	Ferrocarril	6	4	1	1	15	6	+9	13	Round of 32
6	Deportivo Universitario	6	4	0	2	11	6	+5	12	Round of 32
7	Comerciantes	6	3	3	0	7	3	+4	12	Round of 32
8	Deportivo Maldonado	6	4	0	2	12	15	−3	12	Round of 32
9	Ecosem Pasco	6	4	0	2	12	6	+6	12	Round of 32
10	Cultural Volante	6	4	0	2	11	4	+7	12	Round of 32
11	CESA	6	4	0	2	9	5	+4	12	Round of 32
12	Rosario Celendín	6	3	2	1	12	6	+6	11	Round of 32
13	Unión San Martín	6	3	2	1	10	2	+8	11	Round of 32
14	Estudiantil CNI	6	3	2	1	10	7	+3	11	Round of 32
15	Nacional	6	3	2	1	10	6	+4	11	Round of 32
16	Paz Soldán	6	3	2	1	7	2	+5	11	Round of 32
17	Virgen de la Natividad	6	3	2	1	6	3	+3	11	Round of 32
18	San Andrés de Runtu	6	3	1	2	13	7	+6	10	Round of 32
19	Defensor La Bocana	6	3	1	2	11	7	+4	10	Round of 32
20	Bagua Grande	6	3	1	2	7	7	0	10	Round of 32
21	Independiente San Felipe	6	3	1	2	7	5	+2	10	Round of 32
22	Nueva Esperanza	6	3	1	2	10	6	+4	10	Round of 32
23	Señor de Mayo de Huancapata	6	3	0	3	8	11	−3	9	Round of 32
24	Coronel Bolognesi	6	2	3	1	6	4	+2	9	Round of 32
25	Unión Santo Domingo	6	3	0	3	9	9	0	9	Round of 32
26	Deportivo Vianney	6	2	3	1	8	8	0	9	Round of 32
27	UNH	6	2	2	2	5	5	0	8	Round of 32
28	Deportivo Verdecocha	6	2	2	2	5	7	−2	8	Round of 32
29	Colegio Comercio	6	2	2	2	10	6	+4	8	Round of 32
30	Atlético Verdún	6	2	2	2	12	12	0	8	Round of 32
31	Sport Cáceres	6	2	2	2	7	8	−1	8	Round of 32
32	Leoncio Prado	6	2	1	3	5	8	−3	7	Round of 32
33	La Victoria	6	2	1	3	7	7	0	7	Ligas Distritales
34	FC Cahusiños	6	2	1	3	12	6	+6	7	Ligas Distritales
35	Defensor Cubillas	6	2	0	4	10	11	−1	6	Ligas Distritales
36	Atlético Torino	6	2	0	4	3	9	−6	6	Ligas Distritales
37	Agua San Martín	6	2	0	4	6	8	−2	6	Ligas Distritales
38	Academia CIMAC	6	2	0	4	4	10	−6	6	Ligas Distritales
39	Los Tigres	6	1	2	3	4	6	−2	5	Ligas Distritales
40	Credicoop San Cristóbal	6	1	2	3	7	9	−2	5	Ligas Distritales
41	La Paz	6	1	2	3	5	9	−4	5	Ligas Distritales
42	Mariscal Nieto	6	1	2	3	7	12	−5	5	Ligas Distritales
43	Juventud Palmeiras	6	1	2	3	4	11	−7	5	Ligas Distritales
44	Once Caldas	6	1	1	4	4	12	−8	4	Ligas Distritales
45	Defensor Concepción	6	1	1	4	5	11	−6	4	Ligas Distritales
46	Real Sociedad	6	0	3	3	12	19	−7	3	Ligas Distritales
47	Atlético Municipal Iñapari	6	1	0	5	5	22	−17	3	Ligas Distritales
48	Cultural Huracán	6	0	1	5	4	13	−9	1	Ligas Distritales
49	Estrella Azul	6	0	1	5	5	14	−9	1	Ligas Distritales
50	La Balsa	6	0	0	6	0	19	−19	0	Ligas Distritales

Updated to match(es) played on 12 October 2022. Source: - Bases Copa Perú
Rules for classification: 1) points; 2) goal difference; 3) number of goals scored; 4) head-to-head record; 5) drawing of lots

=== Round 1 ===
The round was played between 17 September and 18 September.

Team 1	Score	Team 2
Ferrocarril	6–0	La Balsa
Atlético Torino	1–0	Leoncio Prado
Nueva Esperanza	2–2	Defensor La Bocana
Bagua Grande	0–0	Rosario Celendín
Cultural Volante	3–0	Unión Santo Domingo
Real Sociedad	2–4	Atlético Bruces
Academia CIMAC	2–1	Atlético Verdún
Estudiantil CNI	2–1	Agua San Martín
Colegio Comercio	1–2	Comerciantes
Deportivo Verdecocha	1–0	La Paz
Ecosem Pasco	1–2	Señor de Mayo de Huancapata
San Andrés de Runtu	2–1	Independiente San Felipe
Paz Soldán	1–1	Juventud Palmeiras
Estrella Azul	2–3	Los Libertadores
Unión San Martín	2–0	UNH
Deportivo Vianney	0–0	Defensor Concepción
CESA	3–2	Once Caldas
Cultural Huracán	0–1	Social El Olivo
La Victoria	3–0	Sport Cáceres
Deportivo Garcilaso	4–0	Atlético Municipal Iñapari
Deportivo Maldonado	2–0	Defensor Cubillas
FC Cahusiños	0–0	Los Tigres
Credicoop San Cristóbal	2–0	Deportivo Universitario
Nacional	2–1	Coronel Bolognesi
Virgen de la Natividad	2–1	Mariscal Nieto

=== Round 2 ===
The round was played between 24 September and 25 September.

Team 1	Score	Team 2
Defensor La Bocana	3–1	Ferrocarril
Leoncio Prado	2–1	Nueva Esperanza
Unión Santo Domingo	2–1	Atlético Torino
La Balsa	0–2	Cultural Volante
Agua San Martín	1–0	Bagua Grande
Rosario Celendín	3–3	Real Sociedad
Atlético Verdún	2–1	San Andrés de Runtu
Comerciantes	1–0	Academia CIMAC
La Paz	2–0	Estudiantil CNI
Señor de Mayo de Huancapata	2–1	Colegio Comercio
Atlético Bruces	3–0	Deportivo Verdecocha
Once Caldas	0–0	Paz Soldán
Independiente San Felipe	2–0	Estrella Azul
Juventud Palmeiras	0–4	Unión San Martín
Los Libertadores	5–1	Cultural Huracán
Sport Cáceres	1–1	Deportivo Vianney
UNH	1–0	CESA
Defensor Concepción	1–2	Ecosem Pasco
Defensor Cubillas	2–0	La Victoria
Social El Olivo	2–1	Deportivo Garcilaso
Deportivo Universitario	5–0	Deportivo Maldonado
Atlético Municipal Iñapari	1–0	FC Cahusiños
Mariscal Nieto	2–2	Nacional
Los Tigres	2–1	Virgen de la Natividad
Coronel Bolognesi	2–0	Credicoop San Cristóbal

=== Round 3 ===
The round was played between 28 September and 30 September.

Team 1	Score	Team 2
Ferrocarril	1–1	Leoncio Prado
Atlético Torino	1–0	Defensor La Bocana
Nueva Esperanza	2–0	La Balsa
Bagua Grande	3–1	Unión Santo Domingo
Cultural Volante	1–0	Rosario Celendín
Real Sociedad	2–2	Atlético Verdún
Academia CIMAC	2–1	Agua San Martín
Estudiantil CNI	1–1	Comerciantes
Colegio Comercio	1–1	La Paz
Deportivo Verdecocha	2–1	Señor de Mayo de Huancapata
San Andrés de Runtu	4–1	Atlético Bruces
Paz Soldán	0–1	Independiente San Felipe
Estrella Azul	2–3	Juventud Palmeiras
Unión San Martín	0–0	Los Libertadores
Deportivo Vianney	1–1	UNH
CESA	1–2	Defensor Concepción
Ecosem Pasco	3–1	Once Caldas
Cultural Huracán	0–2	Sport Cáceres
La Victoria	1–2	Social El Olivo
Deportivo Garcilaso	3–1	Defensor Cubillas
Deportivo Maldonado	2–1	Atlético Municipal Iñapari
FC Cahusiños	0–2	Deportivo Universitario
Nacional	0–0	Los Tigres
Credicoop San Cristóbal	2–2	Mariscal Nieto
Virgen de la Natividad	0–0	Coronel Bolognesi

=== Round 4 ===
The round was played between 4 October and 5 October.

Team 1	Score	Team 2
Leoncio Prado	1–2	Ferrocarril
Defensor La Bocana	3–0	Atlético Torino
La Balsa	0–1	Nueva Esperanza
Unión Santo Domingo	1–2	Bagua Grande
Rosario Celendín	2–0	Cultural Volante
Atlético Verdún	2–2	Real Sociedad
Agua San Martín	1–0	Academia CIMAC
Comerciantes	1–1	Estudiantil CNI
La Paz	0–2	Colegio Comercio
Señor de Mayo de Huancapata	1–0	Deportivo Verdecocha
Atlético Bruces	2–1	San Andrés de Runtu
Independiente San Felipe	0–2	Paz Soldán
Juventud Palmeiras	0–0	Estrella Azul
Los Libertadores	1–0	Unión San Martín
UNH	2–0	Deportivo Vianney
Defensor Concepción	0–1	CESA
Once Caldas	1–0	Ecosem Pasco
Sport Cáceres	2–1	Cultural Huracán
Social El Olivo	2–1	La Victoria
Defensor Cubillas	0–2	Deportivo Garcilaso
Atlético Municipal Iñapari	2–3	Deportivo Maldonado
Deportivo Universitario	2–1	FC Cahusiños
Los Tigres	2–3	Nacional
Mariscal Nieto	2–1	Credicoop San Cristóbal
Coronel Bolognesi	0–0	Virgen de la Natividad

=== Round 5 ===
The round was played between 8 October and 9 October.

Team 1	Score	Team 2
Ferrocarril	2–1	Defensor La Bocana
Nueva Esperanza	3–0	Leoncio Prado
Atlético Torino	0–3	Unión Santo Domingo
Cultural Volante	5–0	La Balsa
Bagua Grande	2–1	Agua San Martín
Real Sociedad	2–4	Rosario Celendín
San Andrés de Runtu	5–1	Atlético Verdún
Academia CIMAC	0–2	Comerciantes
Estudiantil CNI	4–1	La Paz
Colegio Comercio	5–1	Señor de Mayo de Huancapata
Deportivo Verdecocha	1–1	Atlético Bruces
Paz Soldán	3–0	Once Caldas
Estrella Azul	1–3	Independiente San Felipe
Unión San Martín	3–0	Juventud Palmeiras
Cultural Huracán	1–1	Los Libertadores
Deportivo Vianney	3–2	Sport Cáceres
CESA	1–0	UNH
Ecosem Pasco	4–0	Defensor Concepción
La Victoria	2–1	Defensor Cubillas
Deportivo Garcilaso	2–1	Social El Olivo
Deportivo Maldonado	3–1	Deprotivo Universitario
FC Cahusiños	10–1	Atlético Municipal Iñapari
Nacional	3–0	Mariscal Nieto
Virgen de la Natividad	1–0	Los Tigres
Credicoop San Cristóbal	2–2	Coronel Bolognesi

=== Round 6 ===
Team 1	Score	Team 2
La Balsa	0–3	Ferrocarril
Leoncio Prado	1–0	Atlético Torino
Defensor La Bocana	2–1	Nueva Esperanza
Rosario Celendín	3–0	Bagua Grande
Unión Santo Domingo	2–0	Cultural Volante
Atlético Bruces	4–1	Real Sociedad
Atlético Verdún	4–0	Academia CIMAC
Agua San Martín	1–2	Estudiantil CNI
Comerciantes	0–0	Colegio Comercio
La Paz	1–1	Deportivo Verdecocha
Señor de Mayo de Huancapata	1–2	Ecosem Pasco
Independiente San Felipe	0–0	San Andrés de Runtu
Juventud Palmeiras	0–1	Paz Soldán
Los Libertadores	3–0	Estrella Azul
UNH	1–1	Unión San Martín
Defensor Concepción	2–3	Deportivo Vianney
Once Caldas	0–3	CESA
Social El Olivo	2–1	Cultural Huracán
Sport Cáceres	0–0	La Victoria
Atlético Municipal Iñapari	0–3	Deportivo Garcilaso
Defensor Cubillas	6–2	Deportivo Maldonado
Los Tigres	0–1	FC Cahusiños
Deportivo Universitario	1–0	Credicoop San Cristóbal
Coronel Bolognesi	1–0	Nacional
Mariscal Nieto	0–2	Virgen de la Natividad

== Final Rounds ==
Round of 32
Deportivo Garcilaso	1	6	7
Leoncio Prado	0	0	0
Paz Soldán	3	4	7
Virgen de la Natividad	0	3	3
Deportivo Maldonado	1	3	4
Unión Santo Domingo	4	1	5
Ecosem Pasco	0	5	5
Coronel Bolognesi	1	0	1
Social El Olivo	0	2	2
Sport Cáceres	1	0	1
Nacional	1	1	2
San Andrés de Runtu	3	2	5
Comerciantes	1	7	8
Deportivo Vianney	2	0	2
Cultural Volante	3	1	4
Señor de Mayo de Huancapata	5	0	5
Los Libertadores	1	0	1
Atlético Verdún	2	2	4
Estudiantil CNI	0	0	0
Defensor La Bocana	1	1	2
Deportivo Universitario	0	2	2
UNH	1	0	1
CESA	0	2	2
Nueva Esperanza	0	1	1
Atlético Bruces	4	6	10
Colegio Comercio	0	2	2
Unión San Martín	1	2	3
Bagua Grande	1	0	1
Ferrocarril	0	2	2
Deportivo Verdecocha	3	0	3
Rosario Celendín	2	3	5
Independiente San Felipe	2	1	3

Round of 16
Deportivo Garcilaso	0	3	3
Paz Soldán	1	0	1
Unión Santo Domingo	0	1	1
Ecosem Pasco	1	2	3
Social El Olivo	0	1	1
San Andrés de Runtu	2	1	3
Comerciantes	1	2	3
Señor de Mayo de Huancapata	2	0	2
Atlético Verdún	3	0	3
Defensor La Bocana	2	2	4
Deportivo Universitario	0	1	1
CESA	2	1	3
Atlético Bruces	2	4	6
Unión San Martín	3	2	5
Deportivo Verdecocha	0	0	0
Rosario Celendín	1	2	3

Quarterfinals
Deportivo Garcilaso	0	3	3
Ecosem Pasco	2	1	3
San Andrés de Runtu	5	0	5
Comerciantes	0	5	5
Defensor La Bocana	4	0	4
CESA	1	2	3
Atlético Bruces	1	4	5
Rosario Celendín	4	1	5

Semifinals
Deportivo Garcilaso
Comerciantes
Defensor La Bocana
Atlético Bruces

Champion & Runner-Up
Deportivo Garcilaso
Comerciantes

=== Round of 32 ===
Team 1	Agg.	Team 2	1st leg	2nd leg
Leoncio Prado	0–7	Deportivo Garcilaso	0–1	0–6
Virgen de la Natividad	3–7	Paz Soldán	0–3	3–4
Deportivo Maldonado	4–5	Unión Santo Domingo	1–4	3–1
Coronel Bolognesi	1–5	Ecosem Pasco	1–0	0–5
Sport Cáceres	1–2	Social El Olivo	1–0	0–2
San Andrés de Runtu	5–2	Nacional	3–1	2–1
Deportivo Vianney	2–8	Comerciantes	2–1	0–7
Señor de Mayo de Huancapata	5–4	Cultural Volante	5–3	0–1
Atlético Verdún	4–1	Los Libertadores	2–1	2–0
Defensor La Bocana	2–0	Estudiantil CNI	1–0	1–0
UNH	1–2	Deportivo Universitario	1–0	0–2
CESA	2–1	Nueva Esperanza	0–0	2–1
Colegio Comercio	2–10	Atlético Bruces	0–4	2–6
Bagua Grande	1–3	Unión San Martín	1–1	0–2
Deportivo Verdecocha	3–2	Ferrocarril	3–0	0–2
Independiente San Felipe	3–5	Rosario Celendín	2–2	1–3

=== Round of 16 ===
Team 1	Agg.	Team 2	1st leg	2nd leg
Paz Soldán	1–3	Deportivo Garcilaso	1–0	0–3
Unión Santo Domingo	1–3	Ecosem Pasco	0–1	1–2
San Andrés de Runtu	3–1	Social El Olivo	2–0	1–1
Señor de Mayo de Huancapata	2–3	Comerciantes	2–1	0–2
Atlético Verdún	3–4	Defensor La Bocana	3–2	0–2
CESA	3–1	Deportivo Universitario	2–0	1–1
Unión San Martín	5–6	Atlético Bruces	3–2	2–4
Deportivo Verdecocha	0–3	Rosario Celendín	0–1	0–2

=== Quarterfinals ===
Team 1	Agg.	Team 2	1st leg	2nd leg
Ecosem Pasco	3–3	Deportivo Garcilaso	2–0	1–3
San Andrés de Runtu	5–5	Comerciantes	5–0	0–5
Defensor La Bocana	4–3	CESA	4–1	0–2
Rosario Celendín	5–5	Atlético Bruces	4–1	1–4

== Final group stage ==
The final group stage, colloquially known as La Finalísima, will be played by the four semifinalists at the Estadio Iván Elías Moreno. The team with the most points will be declared the winner and be promoted to the 2023 Liga 1.

=== Standings ===
Pos	Team	Pld	W	D	L	GF	GA	GD	Pts	Qualification
1	Deportivo Garcilaso (C)	3	2	1	0	8	1	+7	7	2023 Liga 1
2	Comerciantes	3	2	1	0	6	1	+5	7	2023 Liga 2
3	Defensor La Bocana	3	1	0	2	2	6	−4	3	Ligas Departamentales
4	Atlético Bruces	3	0	0	3	3	11	−8	0	Ligas Departamentales

Rules for classification: 1) points; 2) goal difference; 3) goals scored; 4) draw.
(C) Champions

=== Results ===
==== Round 1 ====
27 November 2022	Defensor La Bocana	2–1	Atlético Bruces	Estadio Iván Elías Moreno
12:30	Angelito Flores 26'; Carlos León 49'		Kevin Mejía 89'	Referee: Edwin Ordóñez

27 November 2022	Deportivo Garcilaso	0–0	Comerciantes	Estadio Iván Elías Moreno
15:00				Referee: Jesús Cartagena

==== Round 2 ====
30 November 2022	Atlético Bruces	1–4	Comerciantes	Estadio Iván Elías Moreno
12:30	Irwin Cornejo 85'		Leonardo Salas 10'; Gino Cenepo 29'; Junior Zambrano 40'; Saúl Reyes 90+3'	Referee: Michael Espinoza

30 November 2022	Defensor La Bocana	0–3	Deportivo Garcilaso	Estadio Iván Elías Moreno
15:00			Raúl Tito 40' (pen.) 71'; Gustavo Alencastre 62'	Referee: Diego Haro

==== Round 3 ====
4 December 2022	Atlético Bruces	1–5	Deportivo Garcilaso	Estadio Iván Elías Moreno
12:30	Pedro Quijano 41'		Jhony Obeso 25'; Herbert Castillo 28'; Raúl Tito 50' 79'; Mauricio Malpartida 85'	Referee: Bruno Pérez

4 December 2022	Defensor La Bocana	0–2	Comerciantes	Estadio Iván Elías Moreno
15:00			Junior Zambrano 45+4' (pen.); Gino Cenepo 57'	Referee: Joel Alarcón

== Top scorers ==
As of 4 December 2022

Rank	Name	Club	Goals
1	(Peru) Raúl Tito	Deportivo Garcilaso	11
2	(Peru) Junior Zambrano	Comerciantes	9
3	(Peru) Jorge Vílchez	Rosario Celendín	9
4	(Peru) Mauricio Malpartida	Deportivo Garcilaso	8
5	(Peru) Christian Cuadros	Paz Soldán	8

Source: Futbolperuano.com

== See also ==
- 2022 Liga 1
- 2022 Liga 2
