= Jarlín =

Jarlín is a given name. Notable people with the given name include:

- Jarlín García (born 1993), Dominican baseball player
- Jarlín Quintero (born 1993), Colombian footballer
