= Javier Moreno =

Javier Moreno may refer to:

- Javier Moreno (discus thrower) (born 1942), Cuban athlete
- Javier Moreno (journalist) (born 1963), Spanish journalist and former director of El País;
- Javier Moreno (politician) (born 1965), Spanish politician and Member of the European Parliament
- Javi Moreno (footballer, born 1974), Spanish footballer and manager
- Javier Moreno (cyclist) (born 1984), Spanish professional racing cyclist
- Javi Moreno (footballer, born 1997), Spanish footballer
- Javi Moreno (footballer, born 2000), Spanish footballer

== See also ==
- Xavi Moreno (footballer, born 2003), Peruvian footballer
- Xavi Moreno (footballer, born 2004), Spanish footballer
