= 2023 Liga 2 (Peru) =

Liga 2
- Season: 2023
- Dates: 15 April – 27 October 2023
- Champions: Comerciantes Unidos (2nd title)
- Promoted: Comerciantes Unidos; Los Chankas
- Relegated: Alfonso Ugarte
- Top goalscorer: Matías Sen (20 goals)

The 2023 Liga 2 (known as Liga 2 1xBet 2023 for sponsorship reasons) was the 71st edition of the second tier of Federación Peruana de Futbol. This year's edition started in April 2023 and ended on 27 October 2023.

== Teams ==
=== Team changes ===
Promoted from 2022 Copa Perú	Relegated from 2022 Liga 1	Promoted to 2023 Liga 1	Relegated to 2023 Copa Perú
▲ Comerciantes (2nd)	▼ Ayacucho (17th) ▼ Universidad San Martín (18th) ▼ Carlos Stein (19th)	▲ Cusco (1st) ▲ Unión Comercio (2nd)	▼ Sport Chavelines (13th)

=== Stadia and locations ===
Locations of the 2023 Liga 2 teams

Team	City	Stadium	Capacity
Alfonso Ugarte	Puno	Monumental de la UNA	20,000
Alianza Universidad	Huánuco	Heraclio Tapia	25,000
Ayacucho	Ayacucho	Ciudad de Cumaná	12,000
Carlos Stein	Ferreñafe	Carlos Samamé Cáceres	6,000
Comerciantes	Iquitos	Max Augustín	24,000
Comerciantes Unidos	Cutervo	Juan Maldonado Gamarra	12,000
Deportivo Coopsol	Ventanilla	Municipal Facundo Ramírez Aguilar	5,000
Deportivo Llacuabamba	Otuzco	Municipal de Otuzco	18,000
Juan Aurich	Ferreñafe	Carlos Samamé Cáceres	6,000
Los Chankas	Andahuaylas	Los Chankas	10,000
Pirata	Chongoyape	Municipal de la Juventud	2,000
Santos	Nasca	Municipal de Nasca	10,000
Unión Huaral	Chancay	Rómulo Shaw Cisneros	3,000
Universidad San Martín	Lima	Iván Elías Moreno	10,000

== Fase Regular ==
=== Standings ===
Pos	Team	Pld	W	D	L	GF	GA	GD	Pts	Qualification
1	Comerciantes Unidos (C, P)	26	20	3	3	54	22	+32	63	2024 Liga 1
2	Los Chankas (P)	26	16	5	5	72	25	+47	53	Advance to Liguilla Semifinals
3	Alianza Universidad	26	15	6	5	43	25	+18	51	Advance to Liguilla Semifinals
4	Deportivo Llacuabamba	26	13	7	6	44	31	+13	46	Advance to Liguilla Quarterfinals
5	Santos	26	12	6	8	29	24	+5	42	Advance to Liguilla Quarterfinals
6	Comerciantes	26	11	6	9	27	26	+1	39	Advance to Liguilla Quarterfinals
7	Universidad San Martín	26	10	6	10	34	30	+4	36	Advance to Liguilla Quarterfinals
8	Deportivo Coopsol	26	10	6	10	30	29	+1	36	
9	Juan Aurich	26	7	10	9	23	27	−4	31	
10	Unión Huaral	26	5	9	12	22	34	−12	24	
11	Ayacucho	26	5	8	13	37	50	−13	23	
12	Pirata	26	5	6	15	22	59	−37	21	
13	Carlos Stein	26	1	5	20	26	76	−50	8	
14	Alfonso Ugarte (Note: Alfonso Ugarte was sanctioned with the loss of category after having accumulated two walkovers (from the duels against Unión Huaral and Carlos Stein) and with a sanction of 50 UIT, an amount equivalent to 247,500 soles, in addition to being unable to return to the second division in a period of time of three years., Their pending matches will remain under the final score of 3-0 .) (D, R)	26	6	8	12	35	46	−11	26	Relegation to 2024 Copa Perú

Updated to match(es) played on unknown. Source:
Rules for classification: 1) points; 2) goal difference; 3) goals scored; 4) draw.
(C) Champions; (D) Disqualified; (P) Promoted; (R) Relegated

=== Results ===
Home \ Away	UGA	AUH	AYA	STE	CFC	COM	COO	LLA	JA	LCH	PIR	SAN	HUA	USM
Alfonso Ugarte		2–2	1–1	5–1	2–0	1–2	3–0	4–0	0–3	2–2	3–0	1–1	0–3	3–1
Alianza Universidad	1–1		3–2	3–0	1–0	0–3	3–0	0–1	2–0	2–1	3–1	3–0	1–0	2–2
Ayacucho	2–2	1–3		7–0	2–0	2–4	0–0	1–3	2–1	0–2	2–1	1–1	0–1	1–1
Carlos Stein	3–0	0–2	3–3		1–2	0–1	2–4	0–5	1–1	0–2	0–2	1–3	3–3	0–3
Comerciantes	2–0	3–1	3–1	1–1		2–2	2–1	2–0	1–0	0–0	2–0	1–0	0–0	2–1
Comerciantes Unidos	2–1	0–0	3–1	2–1	2–0		1–0	2–1	2–2	3–2	5–0	2–0	2–0	1–0
Deportivo Coopsol	4–0	0–1	1–0	4–1	1–0	1–2		1–1	2–1	0–2	2–0	0–0	1–0	1–1
Deportivo Llacuabamba	1–1	3–2	2–2	4–3	2–1	0–1	3–0		3–0	1–0	4–0	1–1	1–0	0–0
Juan Aurich	0–0	0–0	1–1	3–1	0–2	1–0	1–1	1–0		1–1	1–1	1–0	0–0	0–2
Los Chankas	3–1	2–2	5–1	7–1	5–0	2–1	2–1	5–0	2–0		11–0	4–1	3–0	2–0
Pirata	4–1	1–2	2–0	2–2	1–0	1–4	1–2	0–3	1–1	2–2		0–0	1–0	0–2
Santos	3–0	1–0	4–1	4–1	0–0	3–1	1–0	0–1	1–0	1–0	3–0		1–0	2–1
Unión Huaral	1–1	1–2	1–2	1–0	1–1	1–5	1–1	2–2	1–3	2–3	0–0	1–0		1–1
Universidad San Martín	2–1	0–2	2–1	2–0	1–0	0–1	0–2	2–2	0–1	3–2	4–1	3–1	0–1	

Updated to match(es) played on 27 September 2023. Source: Liga 2 - official site
Legend: Blue = home team win; Yellow = draw; Red = away team win.

== Liguilla ==
=== Bracket ===
Quarter-finals
5	Santos	0	–	0
6	Comerciantes	1	–	1
4	Deportivo Llacuabamba	0	1	1 (3)
7	Universidad San Martín	1	0	1 (4)

Semi-finals
2	Los Chankas	1	3	4
6	Comerciantes	1	0	1
3	Alianza Universidad	3	3	6
7	Universidad San Martín	2	1	4

Final
2	Los Chankas	1	3	4 (3)
3	Alianza Universidad	3	1	4 (2)

=== Quarterfinals ===
==== First leg ====
2 October 2023
13:00

Universidad San Martín	1–0	Deportivo Llacuabamba
Héctor Bazán 47'

Estadio Iván Elías Moreno, Lima
Referee: Luis Seminario
2 October 2023
15:15

Comerciantes	1–0	Santos
Jhojan Dominguez 58'

Estadio Max Augustín, Iquitos
Referee: Fernando Legario

==== Second leg ====
6 October 2023
15:15

Deportivo Llacuabamba	1–0	Universidad San Martín
Jarlín Quintero 74' (pen.)
Penalties
Jarlín Quintero (penalty scored); Gabriel Acevedo (penalty scored); Julio Montero (penalty missed); Miguel Curiel (penalty scored); Luis Garcia (penalty missed)	3–4	(penalty scored) Damian Ismodes; (penalty scored) Gonzalo Veron; (penalty scored) Erick Noriega; (penalty scored) Ivan Chumpitaz Blas

Estadio Municipal de Otuzco, Otuzco
Referee: Diego Haro
6 October 2023
12:45

Santos	Cancelled	Comerciantes

Estadio 12 de Noviembre, Nazca

=== Semifinals ===
==== First leg ====
10 October 2023
13:00

Universidad San Martín	2–3	Alianza Universidad
Damian Ismodes 18' 45'		Jhon Ibargüen 48'; Charles Monsalvo 49'; Felix Espinoza 58'

Estadio Iván Elías Moreno, Lima
Referee: Fernando Legario
11 October 2023
15:00

Comerciantes	1–1	Los Chankas
Junior Zambrano 21'		Ademar Robles 67'

Estadio Max Augustín, Iquitos
Referee: Jesús Cartagena

==== Second leg ====
15 October 2023
12:00

Alianza Universidad	3–1	Universidad San Martín
Jorginho Sernaque 27'; Felix Espinoza 53'; Lionard Pajoy 80'		Maximiliano Zárate 87'

Estadio Heraclio Tapia, Huánuco
Referee: Joel Alarcón
15 October 2023
15:00

Los Chankas	3–0	Comerciantes
Ederson Mogollon 7'; Luis Ramos 66'; Luis Ramos 75'

Estadio Los Chankas, Andahuaylas
Referee: Diego Haro

=== Finals ===
20 October 2023
13:00

Alianza Universidad	3–1	Los Chankas
Franz Schmidt 36'; Edson Vásquez 90' (pen.); Jorginho Sernaque 90+2'		Joffre Vásquez 78'

Estadio Heraclio Tapia, Huánuco
Referee: Edwin Ordoñez
27 October 2023
15:00

Los Chankas	3–1	Alianza Universidad
Luis Ramos 18' 78'; Oshiro Takeuchi 24'		Lionard Pajoy 68'
Penalties
Carlos López Vanegas (penalty scored); Joffre Vasquez (penalty missed); Ademar Robles (penalty scored); Arly Benites (penalty missed); Luis Ramos (penalty scored)	3–2	(penalty missed) Omar Vasquez; (penalty scored) Jorginho Sernaqué; (penalty scored) Lionard Pajoy; (penalty missed) Jhon Ibargüen; (penalty missed) Raúl Tito

Estadio Los Chankas, Andahuaylas
Referee: Joel Alarcón

== Top goalscorers ==
Rank	Name	Club	Goals
1	(Argentina) Matías Sen	Comerciantes Unidos	20
2	(Peru) Luis Ramos	Los Chankas	15
3	(Peru) Oshiro Takeuchi	Los Chankas	14
4	(Colombia) Jarlín Quintero	Deportivo Llacuabamba	12

== See also ==
- 2023 Liga 1
- 2023 Copa Perú
- 2023 Ligas Departamentales del Perú
- 2023 Liga Femenina
- 2023 Torneo de Promoción y Reserva
