= Colegio Comercio 64 =

Peruvian football club

Colegio Comercio
- Full name: Club Deportivo Colegio Comercio 64
- Nicknames: El Equipo del Pueblo; La Fuerza Colegial
- Founded: 14 April 1987
- Ground: Estadio Aliardo Soria Pérez; Pucallpa
- Capacity: 18,000
- League: Copa Perú
Home colours	Away colours

Club Deportivo Colegio Comercio 64 (sometimes referred as Colegio Comercio) is a Peruvian football club, playing in the city of Pucallpa, Ucayali, Peru.

== History ==
=== Foundation ===
The club was founded on April 14, 1987, by Professor Edilberto Ruiz Dávila, who also served as its first president.

=== Copa Perú ===
In the 2018 Copa Perú, the club advanced to the National Stage, where its campaign ended after finishing in 34th place.

The following year, in the 2019 Copa Perú, the club once again reached the National Stage. However, it was eliminated by Las Palmas in the Round of 32.

In the 2021 Copa Perú, the club returned to the National Stage and progressed to the third phase (Interregional), where it was eliminated by ADT.

In the 2022 Copa Perú, the club won the Liga Departamental de Ucayali, earning qualification for the National Stage, where it was eliminated by Atlético Bruces in the Round of 32.

In 2024, the club failed to advance beyond the first phase of the 2024 Liga Departamental de Ucayali, being eliminated by Real von Humboldt.

In the Liga Departamental de Ucayali, the club won the title and secured qualification for the National Stage of the 2025 Copa Perú. There, it was eliminated by Real Puerto Chimbote in the Round of 32 of the Northern Zone after the tie ended 5–5 on aggregate, with the club losing in the penalty shootout.

== Honours ==
=== Regional ===
- Liga Departamental de Ucayali:

Winners (3): 2018, 2022, 2025
Runner-up (1): 2019

- Liga Provincial de Coronel Portillo:

Winners (3): 2019, 2022, 2025
Runner-up (2): 2018, 2024

- Liga Distrital de Callería:

Winners (3): 2018, 2022, 2025
Runner-up (4): 2012, 2015, 2019, 2024

== See also ==
- List of football clubs in Peru
- Peruvian football league system
