= Ezequiel Naya =

Argentine footballer

Personal information
- Full name: Ezequiel Naya
- Date of birth: 4 August 2001 (age 25)
- Place of birth: Chacabuco, Buenos Aires, Argentina
- Height: 1.91 m (6 ft 3 in)
- Position: Striker

Team information
- Current team: Central Córdoba SdE (on loan from Estudiantes)
- Number: 19

Youth career
- 2014–2019: Estudiantes

Senior career*
Years	Team	Apps	(Gls)
2021–	Estudiantes	9	(1)
2022	→ Deportes Melipilla (loan)	16	(1)
2023	→ Nueva Chicago (loan)	32	(7)
2024	→ Sarmiento de Junín (loan)	14	(1)
2025	→ Deportivo Garcilaso (loan)	33	(8)
2026–	→ Central Córdoba SdE (loan)	19	(2)
- * Club domestic league appearances and goals as of 17:22, 12 November 2026 (UTC)

Ezequiel Naya (born 4 August 2001) is an Argentine footballer who plays as a striker for Central Córdoba SdE, on loan from Estudiantes de La Plata.

== Club career ==
Born in Chacabuco, Buenos Aires, Argentina, Naya started his career with Estudiantes de La Plata. He made his professional debut in the 0–3 win against Sarmiento on 17 July 2021 under Ricardo Zielinski.

In 2022, he moved to Chile and joined Deportes Melipilla in the Primera B on a one-year loan.

In the 2023 season, he played on loan for Nueva Chicago in the Primera Nacional. On June 1, 2024, it goes on loan to Sarmiento de Junín until December 2025 with a 50% purchase option.

In 2025, Naya joined Deportivo Garcilaso of the Peruvian First Division. He signed a one-year contract, and the Peruvian club had an option to purchase 50% of his rights for around $500,000. He had a successful 2025, scoring 8 goals in 33 matches and helping the team qualify for the 2026 Copa Sudamericana.

In 2026, the Peruvian club did not exercise the purchase option, and the player returned to Estudiantes (LP).

== Career statistics ==
=== Club ===
As of 17 March 2026.

Club	Division	Season	League		Cup		Continental		Total	
Club	Division	Season	Apps	Goals	Apps	Goals	Apps	Goals	Apps	Goals
Estudiantes	1ª	2021	3	1	0	0	—		3	1
Estudiantes	1ª	2024	1	0	5	0	1	0	7	0
Estudiantes	Total		4	1	5	0	1	0	10	1
Deportes Melipilla	2ª	2022	16	1	0	0	—		16	1
Nueva Chicago	2ª	2023	32	7	0	0	—		32	7
Sarmiento de Junín	1ª	2024	14	1	0	0	—		14	1
Deportivo Garcilaso	1ª	2025	33	8	0	0	—		33	8
Central Córdoba SdE	1ª	2026	6	1	1	0	0	0	7	1
Career total			105	19	6	0	1	0	112	19

== Honours ==
Estudiantes

- Copa de la Liga Profesional: 2024
