= Aldair Salazar =

Peruvian footballer (born 1994)

Personal information
- Full name: Héctor Aldair Salazar Tejada
- Date of birth: 19 August 1994 (age 32)
- Place of birth: Callao, Peru
- Height: 1.79 m (5 ft 10 1/2 in)
- Position: Defender

Team information
- Current team: Deportivo Garcilaso
- Number: 2

Senior career*
Years	Team	Apps	(Gls)
2013–2014	Juan Aurich	4	(1)
2016–2018	Deportivo Municipal	84	(0)
2019–2020	Alianza Lima	44	(1)
2021–2022	Ayacucho	57	(2)
2023–	Deportivo Garcilaso	78	(1)
- * Club domestic league appearances and goals as of 30 December 2025

Héctor Aldair Salazar Tejada (born 19 August 1994) is a Peruvian professional footballer who plays as a defender for Peruvian Primera División club Deportivo Garcilaso.

== Career ==
In December 2018, Salazar joined Primera División club Alianza Lima on a two-year deal.

He signed for Ayacucho in January 2021 after Alianza Lima terminated his contract.
