= Deportivo Garcilaso =

Association football club in Peru

- Full name: Club Deportivo Garcilaso
- Nicknames: El Garci; El Vendaval Celeste; El Pedacito de Cielo; Rico Garci; El Depor; Los Gatos; La G
- Founded: 1957; 69 years ago
- Ground: Estadio Garcilaso de la Vega
- Capacity: 45,056
- Chairman: Edgar Catunta
- Manager: Sebastián Domínguez
- League: Liga 1
- 2025: Liga 1, 7th of 19
Home colours	Away colours	Third colours

Club Deportivo Garcilaso, most commonly known as Deportivo Garcilaso, or El Garci, is a Peruvian professional football club based in the city of Cusco. Founded in 1957, the club competes in the Peruvian Primera División, after being promoted by winning the 2022 Copa Perú.

Since its appearance it has maintained a strong rivalry with Cienciano, made up of students from the National College of Sciences. This rivalry between both educational institutions transcended football, giving rise to the Cusco Classic. The club was invited to participate in the Copa Presidente de la República in 1970. Since then, the club participated in the Copa Perú until 2023, where they got promoted to the Liga 1 after winning the tournament in 2022. The club plays their home games at Estadio Garcilaso, which they share with rivals Cienciano and Cusco FC.

== History ==
Deportivo Garcilaso was founded on 13 April 1957 as Deportivo Lucre by the Garmendia brothers. It was then sold to a church pastor, Monsignor Publio B. Prada Torres, who promoted football at the Great Inca Garcilaso de la Vega school and was a father in the church of San Blast.

In 1970 Deportivo Garcilaso was invited by the Peruvian Football Association to participate in the Copa Presidente de la República. After overcoming the group stage, they were eliminated by Porvenir Miraflores.

The club has participated on several occasions in the final stages of the Copa Perú, one of its best campaigns being the 1979 Copa Perú where it reached the Hexagonal Final. They were departmental champion after defeating Manco II of Quillabamba in the final and qualified for the Regional Stage where they eliminated América Star de Juliaca and Juventud La Joya de Puerto Maldonado. In the National Stage, they knocked out Pesca Peru de Mollendo in their group and qualified together with Deportivo Centenario de Ayacucho to the final. In that phase they finished in third place, tied with Defensor Lima, behind ADT Tarma and Comercial Aguas Verdes de Zarumilla, and were eliminated from the tournament.

In the 2000 Copa Perú, the club qualified to the National Stage, but was eliminated by Coronel Bolognesi in the Quarterfinals. In the 2003 Copa Perú, the club qualified to the National Stage, but was eliminated by Deportivo Enersur in the Quarterfinals. In the 2007 Copa Perú, the club qualified to the National Stage, but was eliminated by Unión Minas (Orcopampa) in the Round of 16.

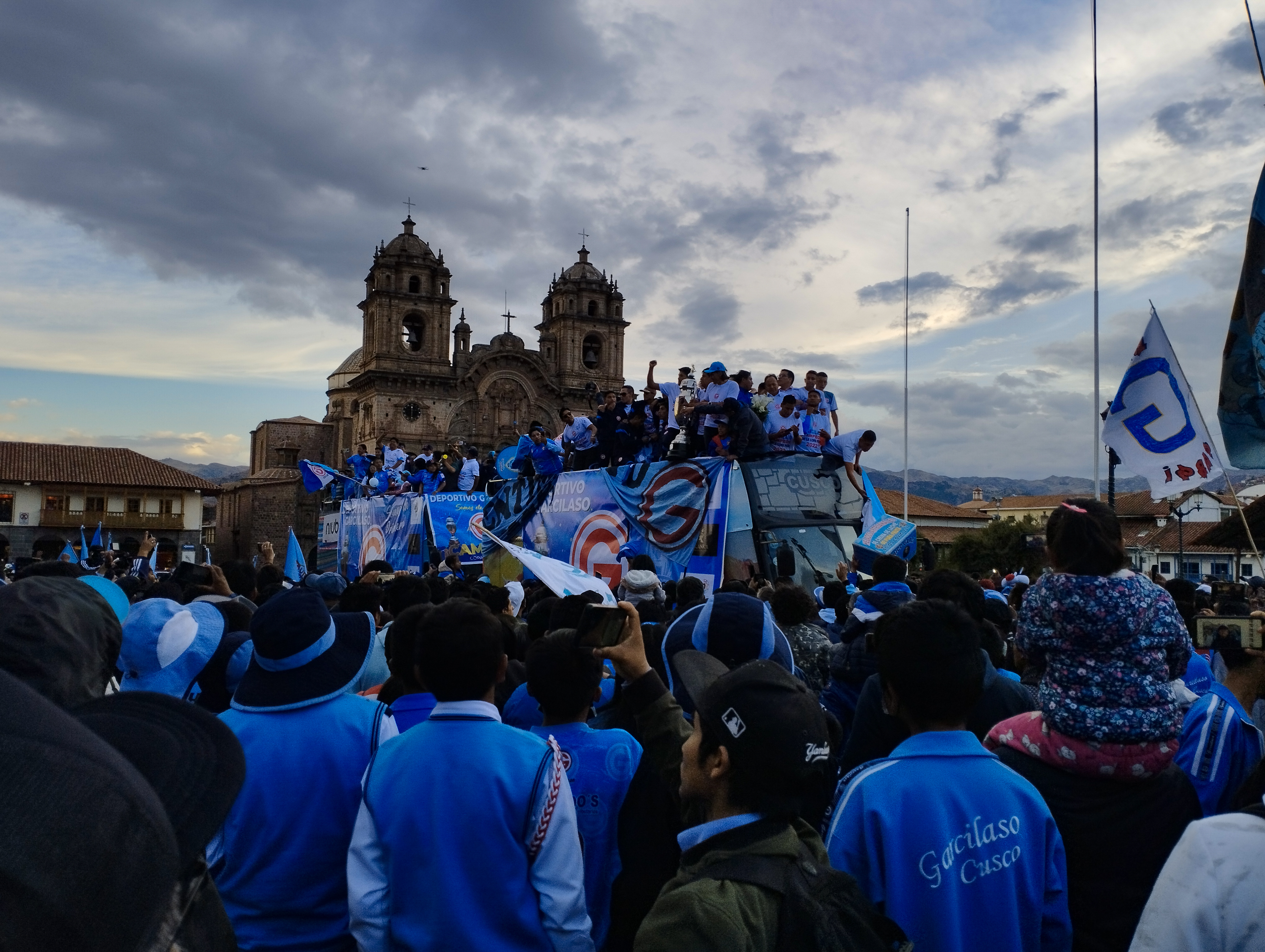
Deportivo Garcilaso celebrating its 2022 Copa Perú win in Cusco

After being crowned champion of the Departmental League of Cusco for the fifth consecutive year, Deportivo Garcilaso arrived at the national phase with the conviction of having a good performance and winning the long-awaited title. In the regular phase of the national stage in the Copa Perú, the team finished in first place in the general table of the 50 teams, which ensured that they closed the knockout rounds at home. He easily beat Leoncio Prado in the round of 16, Paz Soldán FBC in the round of 16 and in the quarterfinals he had an even key against Ecosem Pasco. The first leg in Pasco was lost 2-0, in the second leg in Cuzco they started losing in the first half, but managed to turn it around by obtaining a final 3-1 and because they were better placed than their rival in the general table, they managed to reach the final quadrangular that would be played in Lima.

In the final of the 2022 Copa Perú they started by drawing 0-0 against Comerciantes, then won 3-0 against Defensor La Bocana, and against Atlético Bruces they thrashed 5-1 and by goal difference they obtained first place and were promoted to Liga 1 for the first time in their history.

The club debuted very well in the 2023 season, placing 7th on the aggregate table and qualified for the 2024 Copa Sudamericana, making their first international appearance. Deportivo Garcilaso placed third in their Copa Sudamericana group and was eliminated in the Group Stage with four points.

== Stadium ==
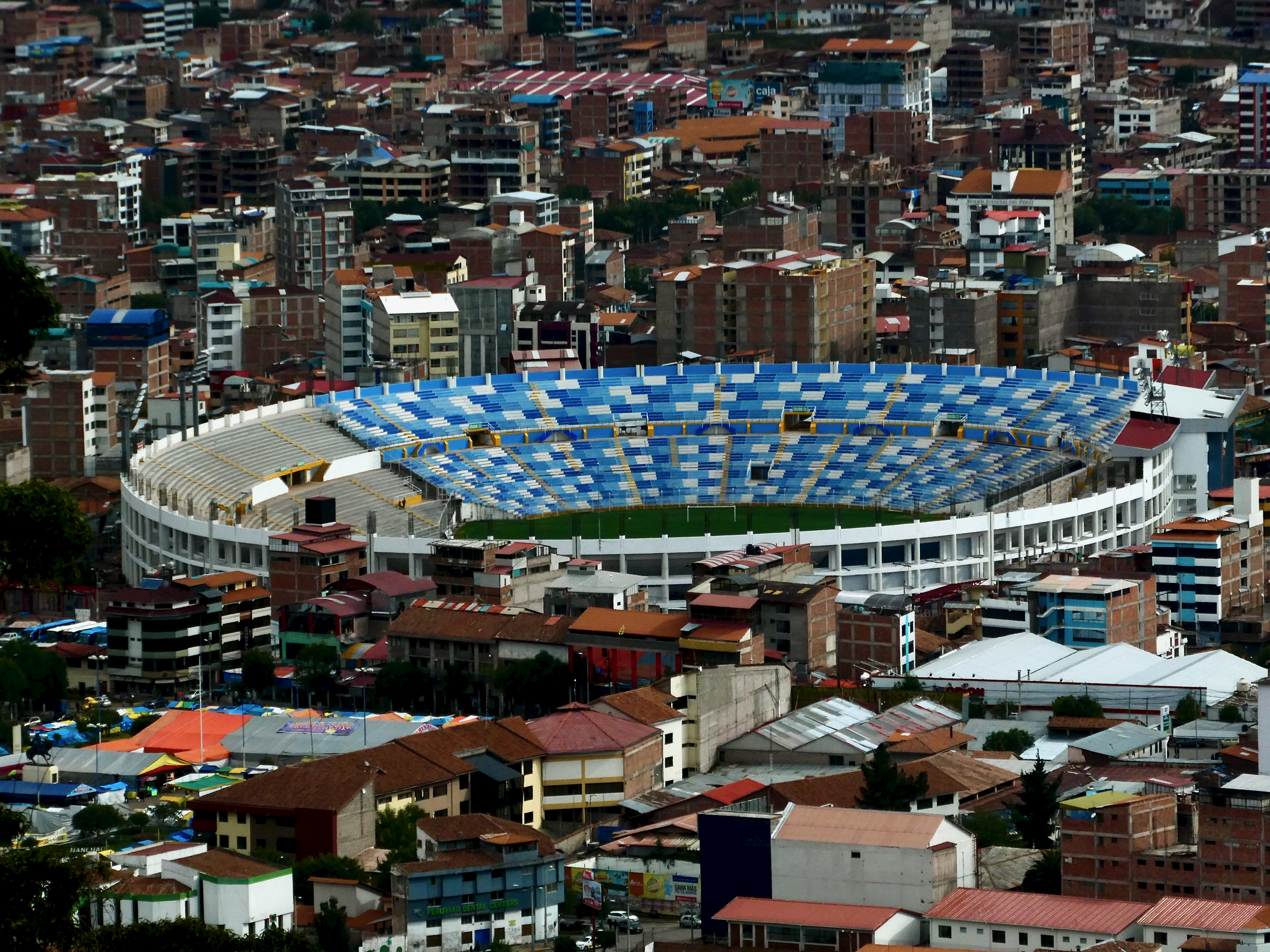
Estadio Garcilaso

Deportivo Garcilaso play their home games in Estadio Garcilaso de la Vega in downtown Cusco. It was named after the Peruvian writer, Inca Garcilaso de la Vega. When first inaugurated in 1950, it had a spectator capacity of 22,000 and had a running track. It currently has a capacity of 45,036. The stadium is known for having the cleanest and most well maintained grass pitch in South America. Deportivo Garcilaso shares the stadium with Cienciano and Cusco FC.

In 2004, the stadium's capacity was expanded to 42,000, losing its running track. Because of Cienciano's success in international tournaments, it would be a venue in the Copa America 2004, which was hosted by Peru. In 2013, there was another renovation which expanded the stadium to 45,000 and added new luxury boxes, seating and a new exterior. The initial renovation was meant to add a roof and modern wall around the stadium as well, but was not implemented due to a low budget.

== Supporters ==
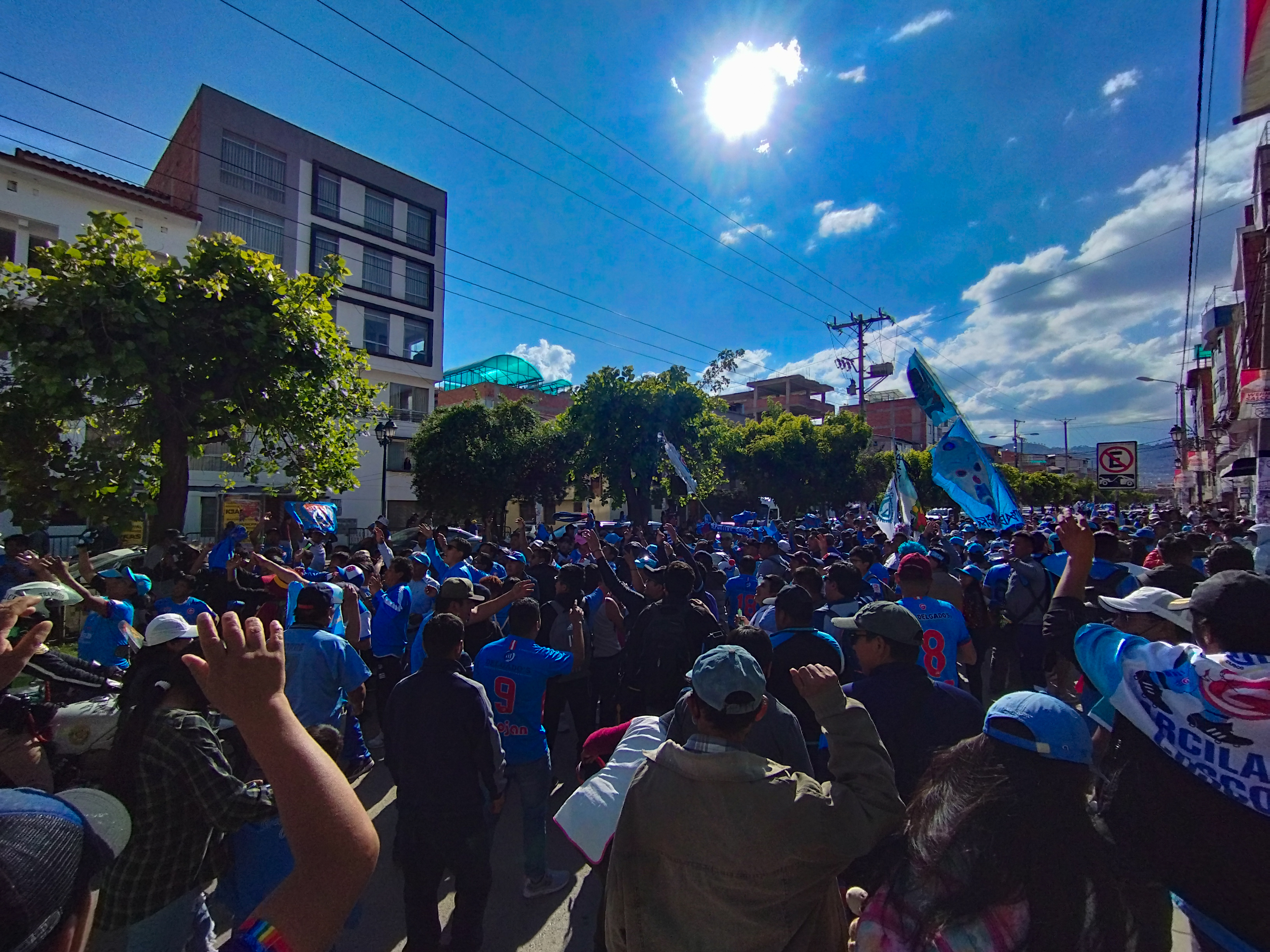
Deportivo Garcilaso fans

Deportivo Garcilaso is among the big three clubs of Cusco, the others being Cienciano and Cusco FC. Deportivo Garcilaso fans are known for their vibrant sky blue and red colors. The south stand of the Estadio Garcilaso is painted in the club colors. The north stand is painted red to represent Cienciano. In 2023, Deportivo Garcilaso was ranked third in the Peruvian Primera División in terms of most attendance. With a total attendance of 48,187 by the 10th matchday of the 2023 Liga 1, Deportivo Garcilaso ranked higher than notable clubs Sporting Cristal and FBC Melgar. This made the club the largest club in Cusco in 2023.

In the 2024 season, the club ranked 7th in the most attendance of the season, with a total of 101,317 fans. Rivals Cienciano have ranked higher from the previous season, placing 5th with a total of 157,289 fans. Deportivo Garcilaso ranked the second most popular club of Cusco.

== Rivalries ==
Deportivo Garcilaso has had a long-standing rivalry with local club Cienciano and Cusco FC, known as the Clásico Cusqueño. Upstart Real Garcilaso (now known as Cusco FC), founded in 2009, has outperformed Deportivo in recent years and now plays in the Peruvian Primera Division as well. All three clubs share the same home stadium, Estadio Inca Garcilaso de la Vega. The rivalries are among the biggest in Peru.

== Current squad ==
As of 10 September 2024

Note: Flags indicate national team as defined under FIFA eligibility rules; some limited exceptions apply. Players may hold more than one non-FIFA nationality.

No.	Pos.	Nation	Player
1	GK	PER	Patrick Zubczuk
2	DF	PER	Aldair Salazar
4	DF	PER	Frank Avendaño
5	MF	ARG	Cristian García
6	MF	PER	Inti Garrafa
7	FW	PER	Jorge Bazán
8	MF	ARG	Nicolás Gómez
10	FW	PER	Kevin Sandoval
11	FW	ARG	Pablo Erustes
12	GK	PER	Mallki Marmanillo
13	DF	PER	Juan Diego Lojas
14	DF	ARG	Ignacio Gariglio
16	MF	ARG	Carlos Beltrán (captain)

No.	Pos.	Nation	Player
17	DF	PER	Alonso Yovera
18	DF	PER	Orlando Núñez
19	FW	ARG	Ezequiel Naya
20	FW	PER	James Morales
22	FW	PER	Aldair Rodríguez
23	DF	PER	Xavi Moreno
25	MF	PER	Emmanuel Páucar
26	MF	PER	Yuriel Celi (on loan from Universitario)
28	FW	PER	Jean Franco Valer
29	GK	PER	Miguel Ramírez
31	GK	PER	Juniors Barbieri
33	DF	PER	Samir Villacorta
55	DF	PER	Erick Canales

== Statistics and results in First Division ==
=== League history ===
Season	Div.	Pos.	Pl.	W	D	L	GF	GA	P	Notes
2023	1st	7	36	13	13	10	56	47	51	7/19 Aggregate table
2024	1st	12	34	9	8	17	37	43	37	12/18 Aggregate table
2025	1st	7	35	14	10	11	48	40	52	7/19 Aggregate table

== Honours ==
=== Senior titles ===
Keys

- Record
- ^{(s)} Shared record

Type	Competition	Titles	Runner-up	Winning years	Runner-up years
National (League)	Copa Perú	1	—	2022	—
Regional (League)	Región Sureste	1	—	1970	—
Regional (League)	Región V	—	1	—	1996
Regional (League)	Región VII	3	2	1979, 2000, 2003	1998, 2001
Regional (League)	Región VIII	1	—	2007	—
Regional (League)	Región X	2	—	1993, 1994	—
Regional (League)	Liga Departamental del Cusco	22	3	1968, 1969, 1974, 1975, 1979, 1980, 1981, 1990, 1991, 1996, 1998, 2000, 2001, 2003, 2005, 2007, 2008, 2016. 2017, 2018, 2019, 2022	2004, 2009, 2015
Regional (League)	Liga Provincial de Cusco	16	4	1968, 1969, 1974, 1975, 1978, 2003, 2007, 2008, 2009, 2011, 2012, 2014, 2016, 2018, 2019, 2022	2002, 2010, 2013, 2015
Regional (League)	Liga Distrital de Cusco	20	4	1963, 1968, 1969, 1974, 1975, 1979, 1991, 1993, 1996, 1998, 2000, 2003, 2004, 2005, 2008, 2009, 2011, 2012, 2014, 2018	2010, 2013, 2015, 2022

== Performance in CONMEBOL competitions ==
- Copa Sudamericana: 2 appearances

2024: Group Stage
2026: First Stage

== Presidents ==
President	Period
(Peru) Elvis Candia	2005-2006
(Peru) Danilo Villavicencio	2007
(Peru) Elvis Candia	2008-2010
(Peru) Mario Yépez	2011
(Peru) Manuel del Carpio	2011
(Peru) Edgar Echegaray	2012
(Peru) Evert Salas	2013
(Peru) Marco Baca	2014
(Peru) Carlos Turpo Valles	2015
(Peru) Hugo Macedo	2016
(Peru) Arturo Licona	2016
(Peru) Néstor Candia Torres	2017
(Peru) Edgar Catunta Guillén	2018-2019
(Peru) Pedro Auccacusi Quispe	2021
(Peru) Verioska Zúñiga	2022
(Peru) Alfredo Santos Huaranca	2022
(Peru) Edgar Catunta Guillén	2023-

== Women’s football ==
Type	Competition	Titles	Runner-up	Winning years	Runner-up years
Regional (League)	Liga Departamental del Cusco	1	—	2025, 2026	—
