= Club Leoncio Prado =

Peruvian football club

Leoncio Prado
- Full name: Club Social Deportivo Leoncio Prado
- Founded: May 30, 1956; 69 years ago
- Ground: Estadio Andres Feijóo Zárate, Pampas de Hospital
- League: Copa Perú
Home colours	Away colours	Third colours

Club Social Deportivo Leoncio Prado (sometimes referred as Leoncio Prado) is a Peruvian football club, playing in the city of Pampas de Hospital, Tumbes, Peru.

== History ==
The Club Social Deportivo Leoncio Prado was founded on May 30, 1956.

In 1980 Copa Perú, the club qualified to the Regional Stage, but was eliminated by Los Aguerridos de Monsefú and Sport Bellavista.

== Honours ==
=== Regional ===
- Liga Departamental de Tumbes:

Winners (2): 1979, 1991
Runner-up (1): 2022

- Liga Provincial de Zarumilla:

Winners (4): 1979, 1991, 2022, 2024

- Liga Distrital de Pampas de Hospital:

Winners (3): 1973, 2019, 2024
Runner-up (2): 2017, 2022

== See also ==
- List of football clubs in Peru
- Peruvian football league system
