= Xavi Moreno (footballer, born 2003) =

Peruvian footballer (born 2003)

Personal information
- Full name: Xavi Moreno Layme
- Date of birth: 13 August 2003 (age 23)
- Place of birth: Arequipa, Peru
- Height: 1.77 m (5 ft 10 in)
- Position: Midfielder

Team information
- Current team: Deportivo Garcilaso
- Number: 23

Youth career
- –2020: FBC Melgar

Senior career*
Years	Team	Apps	(Gls)
2021–2023	Sport Boys	6	(0)
2024	Deportivo Llacuabamba	19	(1)
2025–	Deportivo Garcilaso	20	(0)
- * Club domestic league appearances and goals as of 30 December 2025

Xavi Moreno Layme (born 13 August 2003) is a Peruvian footballer who plays as a midfielder for Deportivo Garcilaso. In the past he played for two other teams in Peru, Deportivo Llacuabamba and Sport Boys

== Career statistics ==
=== Club ===
As of 13 September 2025.

Club	Season	League			Cup		Continental		Other		Total	
Club	Season	Division	Apps	Goals	Apps	Goals	Apps	Goals	Apps	Goals	Apps	Goals
Sport Boys	2021	Peruvian Primera División	1	0	0	0	0	0	0	0	1	0
Career total			1	0	0	0	0	0	0	0	1	0
