= C.D. La Victoria =

La Victoria
- Full name: Club Deportivo La Victoria
- Founded: August 18, 1972; 53 years ago
- Ground: Monumental de Condebamba; Abancay, Peru
- Capacity: 12,000
- League: Copa Perú
Home colours	Away colours

Club Deportivo La Victoria (sometimes referred as La Victoria) is a Peruvian football club, playing in the city of Abancay, Apurímac, Peru.

== History ==
The Club Deportivo La Victoria was founded on August 18, 1972, and participated in the 1992 Torneo Zonal.

In 2014 Copa Perú, the club qualified to the Departamental Stage, but was eliminated by Miguel Grau and DECH in the Cuadrangular Final.

In 2016 Copa Perú, the club qualified to the National Stage, but was eliminated when it finished in the 39th place.

== Honours ==
=== Regional ===
- Liga Departamental de Apurímac:

Winners (2): 1990, 2022
Runner-up (1): 2016

- Liga Provincial de Abancay:

Winners (1): 1990
Runner-up (3): 2014, 2016, 2022

- Liga Distrital de Abancay:

Winners (2): 1990, 2016
Runner-up (5): 2012, 2014, 2022, 2023, 2026

== See also ==
- List of football clubs in Peru
- Peruvian football league system
