= Deportivo Ferrocarril =

Ferrocarril
- Full name: Club Social Deportivo Ferrocarril
- Nicknames: Ferro; Ferroviario
- Founded: February 12, 1950; 76 years ago
- Ground: Estadio 24 de Julio, Zarumilla
- League: Copa Perú
Home colours

Club Social Deportivo Ferrocarril (sometimes referred as Ferrocarril) is a Peruvian football club, playing in the city of Zarumilla, Tumbes, Peru.

== History ==
The Club Social Deportivo Ferrocarril was founded on February 12, 1950.

In 1970 Copa Perú, the club qualified to the Regional Stage, but was eliminated by Atlético Torino and Unión Tumán.

In 2014 Copa Perú, the club qualified to the Provincial Stage, but was eliminated by Sport Unión and Sport Municipal.

In 2016 Copa Perú, the club qualified to the Provincial Stage, but was eliminated by Comercial Aguas Verdes.

In 2018 Copa Perú, the club qualified to the National Stage, but was eliminated when it finished in 33rd place.

== Rivalries ==
=== Clásico de Zarumilla ===
Ferrocarril has had a long-standing rivalry with Sport Bolognesi. This rivalry is known as the Clásico de Zarumilla.

== Honours ==
=== Senior titles ===
Keys

- Record
- ^{(s)} Shared record

Type	Competition	Titles	Runner-up	Winning years	Runner-up years
Regional (League)	Liga Departamental de Tumbes	3	2	1969, 2018, 2022	1966, 1970
Regional (League)	Liga Superior de Tumbes	—	1	—	2019
Regional (League)	Liga Provincial de Zarumilla	3	—	1992, 2018, 2022	—
Regional (League)	Liga Distrital de Zarumilla	10	2	1953, 1966, 1969, 1970, 1992, 2014, 2018, 2022, 2023, 2026	2016, 2025

== See also ==
- List of football clubs in Peru
- Peruvian football league system
