= AD Comerciantes FC =

Peruvian football club

Comerciantes
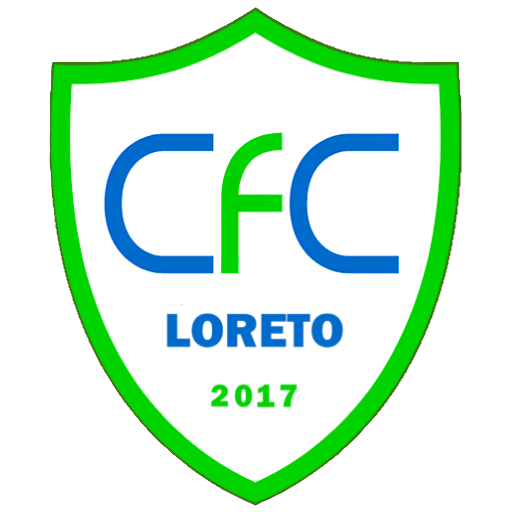
- Full name: Asociación Deportiva Comerciantes Fútbol Club
- Nickname: La Fuerza Emprendedora Fuerza Loretana
- Founded: 20 August 2017; 8 years ago
- Ground: Estadio Max Augustín
- Capacity: 24,576
- Chairman: Héctor Becerra
- Manager: Juan Carlos Bazalar
- League: Liga 2
- 2024: Liga 2, 3rd of 18
- Website: https://www.facebook.com/people/Comerciantes-FC-de-Loreto/100063331024207/
Home colours	Away colours

Asociación Deportiva Comerciantes Fútbol Club commonly known as Comerciantes, is a Peruvian professional football club, playing in the city of Belén, Loreto. Founded in 2017, they currently participate in the Liga 2, after gaining promotion from the 2022 Copa Perú.

== History ==
The Comerciantes FC was founded on 20 August 2017. Comerciantes would rise to be the new largest football club in the city of Iquitos and the whole department of Loreto, after the downfall of Colegio Nacional Iquitos.

In 2018 Copa Perú, the club qualified to the Departamental Stage, but was eliminated by Estudiantil CNI and Caballococha in the Cuadrangular Final.

In 2019, Comerciantes won the Liga Departamental de Loreto for the first time and qualified for the 2019 Copa Perú. The club was eliminated by Sport Estrella in the Quarter-finals.

In Comerciantes qualified for the 2022 Copa Perú after being runner-up in the Liga Departamental de Loreto. Despite not winning the championship, they were promoted to Liga 2 for the 2023 season. In the 2023 season, Comerciantes qualified for the Ligiulla stage of the tournament, reaching the semi-finals, but were eliminated by Los Chankas.

== Stadium ==
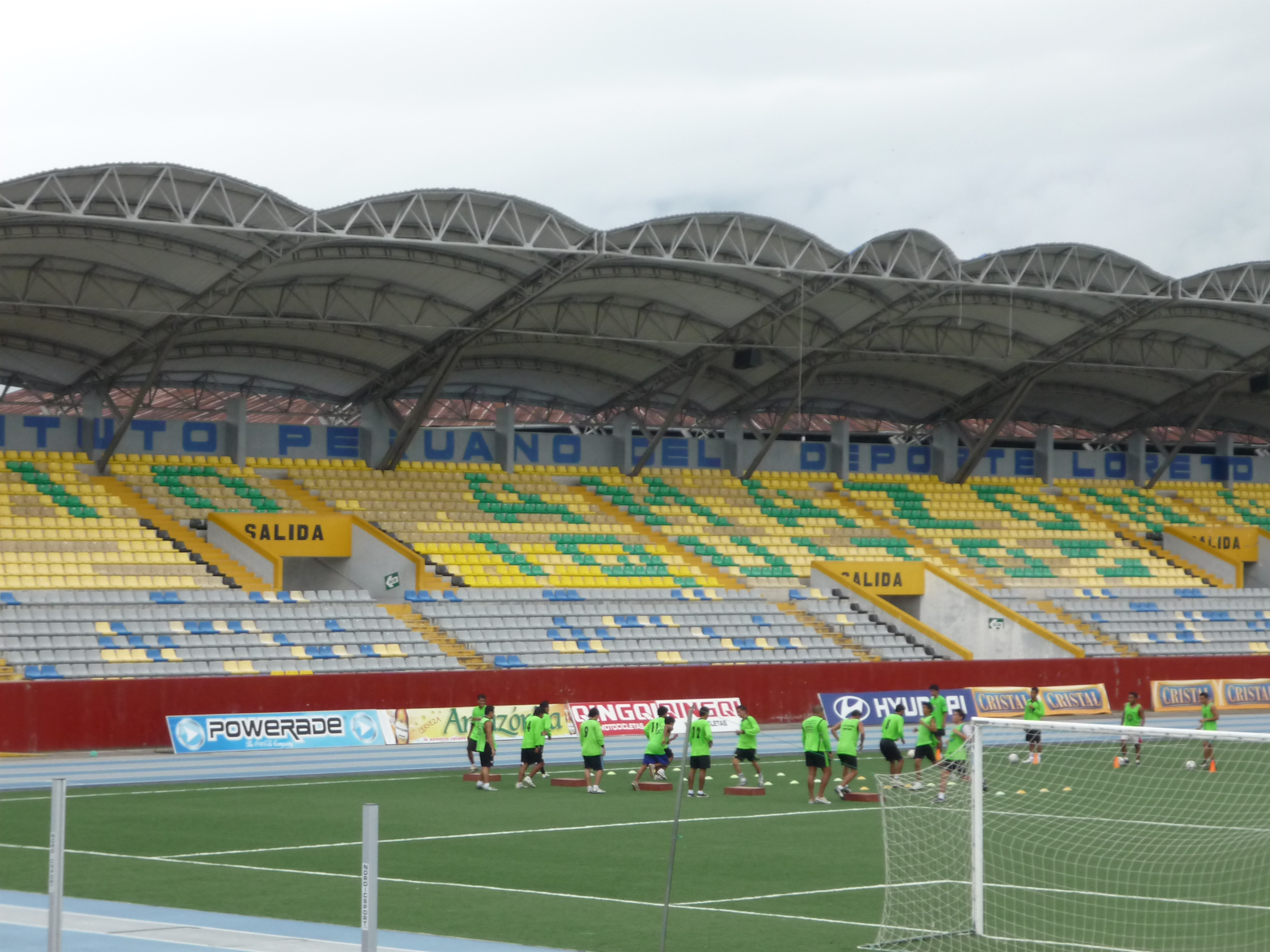
Estadio Max Augustín

While Comerciantes is based in Belén, in the outskirts of Iquitos, they play their home games at Estadio Max Augustín, the largest stadium in the Peruvian rainforest. It has a capacity of 24,576 spectators.

== Current squad ==
Note: Flags indicate national team as defined under FIFA eligibility rules; some limited exceptions apply. Players may hold more than one non-FIFA nationality.

No.	Pos.	Nation	Player
1	GK	PER	Ennis Vázquez
2	DF	PER	Harry Montalván
3	DF	PER	Ronald Rios
5	MF	PER	Haron Hoyos
6	MF	PER	Kevin Davila
7	FW	COL	Brayan Torres
8	MF	PER	Bertin Pinedo
9	FW	PER	Junior Zambrano
11	FW	PER	Gino Cenepo
12	DF	PER	Leonardo Salas
13	DF	COL	Jefferson Valdeblanquez
14	MF	PER	Rolando Anaya
16	DF	PER	Luis Romero
17	MF	PER	Piero Vela (captain)

No.	Pos.	Nation	Player
18	GK	PER	Roberto Pérez
19	FW	PER	Jhojan Domínguez
20	FW	PER	Gary Correa
21	GK	PER	Karlo Sánchez
23	DF	PER	Patrick Reategui
25	FW	URU	Santiago Silva
26	MF	PER	Rider Guevara
27	FW	COL	Mauricio Cortés
28	MF	PER	Ricardo Chipao
29	FW	COL	Rivaldo Correa
30	MF	PER	Diego Cossio
31	DF	PER	Jerry Navarro
33	MF	PER	Daniel Pinedo

== Honours ==
=== Senior titles ===
Keys

- Record
- ^{(s)} Shared record

Type	Competition	Titles	Runner-up	Winning years	Runner-up years
National (League)	Copa Perú	—	1	—	2022
Regional (League)	Liga Departamental de Loreto	1	1	2019	2022
Regional (League)	Liga Provincial de Maynas	2	1	2018, 2019	2022
Regional (League)	Liga Distrital de Belén	3	—	2018, 2019, 2022	—

== See also ==
- List of football clubs in Peru
- Peruvian football league system
