= Jarlín Quintero =

Colombian footballer (born 1993)

Personal information
- Full name: Jarlín Medardo Quintero León
- Date of birth: 19 August 1993 (age 33)
- Place of birth: Magüí Payán, Colombia
- Height: 1.82 m (6 ft 0 in)
- Position: Forward

Team information
- Current team: Los Chankas
- Number: 11

Senior career*
Years	Team	Apps	(Gls)
2012–2013	América Cali	12	(1)
2014–2015	Aragua	29	(12)
2015	Cúcuta Deportivo	4	(0)
2016	Carabobo	14	(4)
2017	Deportivo Lara	13	(3)
2017	Atlético Reynosa		
2018	Deportivo Hualgayoc	23	(14)
2019	UTC Cajamarca	31	(8)
2020	Academia Cantolao	25	(10)
2021	Sport Huancayo	20	(3)
2022	Jaguares Córdoba	24	(2)
2023	Deportivo Llacuabamba	23	(13)
2024–2025	UTC Cajamarca	67	(33)
2026–	Los Chankas	22	(6)
- * Club domestic league appearances and goals as of 11:50, 14 September 2026 (UTC)

Jarlín Medardo Quintero León (born 19 August 1993) is a Colombian footballer who plays as a forward for Peruvian club Los Chankas. He has spent most of his career abroad, in the Venezuelan Primera División and the Peruvian Primera División.

== Career ==
Born in Magüí Payán in the Nariño Department, Quintero began his career at América de Cali. He played five games in his debut Categoría Primera B season in 2012, scoring once in the first four minutes of a 3–0 home win over Unión Magdalena on 21 May. The team won the Apertura tournament on penalties against that opponent, but lost the overall final by the same method to Alianza Petrolera.

Quintero moved in 2014 to Aragua of the Venezuelan Primera División. In September that year, he and four teammates were affected by the chikungunya virus. He scored 12 goals in the 2014–15 season.

In July 2015, Quintero returned to Colombia, this time to its Categoría Primera A and Cúcuta Deportivo. He went back to Venezuela to play the 2016 season at Carabobo, scoring four goals and signing for Deportivo Lara for the following year.

After a brief spell at Atlético Reynosa in Mexico, Quintero signed for Deportivo Hualgayoc in the Peruvian Segunda División, contributing 14 goals in the 2018 season. Remaining in the same city, he transferred to UTC Cajamarca of the Peruvian Primera División for the following season. On 3 April 2019, he scored on his continental debut to equalise in a 1–1 home draw with Cerro of Uruguay in the first round of the Copa Sudamericana.

Quintero scored 10 goals for Academia Cantolao in the same league in 2020. He played the following season at Sport Huancayo. On 26 September 2021 he missed a penalty kick in a 3–1 home loss to Universitario after opposing goalkeeper José Carvallo taunted him in a way that the Peruvian media likened to the tactics of Argentina international Emiliano Martínez.

In January 2022, Quintero returned to his country's league for the first time in seven years, joining Jaguares de Córdoba. A year later, he went back to Peru's second tier with Deportivo Llacuabamba. In October, in the playoff quarter-finals, he scored a penalty for the only goal of the home second leg against Universidad de San Martín, sending the tie to a penalty shootout in which he netted again in a defeat.

Quintero returned to UTC Cajamarca for the 2024 season. While his team only avoided relegation on goal difference over Carlos A. Mannucci, he was the third-highest scorer in the league with 17 goals in 32 games; he earned a contract extension for the following year. In 2025, he was joint third highest scorer, with 16 goals, again in a close battle with relegation.

Quinteros's form for UTC attracting interest from Peruvian clubs and some from Asia, and he said that he wished to remain in Peru due to his naturalisation process reaching its conclusion. On 5 December 2025, he signed for Los Chankas for the new year.

== Career statistics ==
=== Club ===
As of match played on 16 September 2025.

Club	Division	Season	League		Cup		Continental		Total	
Club	Division	Season	Apps	Goals	Apps	Goals	Apps	Goals	Apps	Goals
América Cali	Categoría Primera B	2012	5	1	3	1	-		8	2
América Cali	Categoría Primera B	2013	7	0	8	1	-		15	1
América Cali	Total		12	1	11	2	0	0	23	3
Aragua	Venezuelan Primera División	2014-15	29	12	0	0	-		29	12
Cúcuta Deportivo	Categoría Primera A	2015	4	0	0	0	-		4	0
Carabobo	Venezuelan Primera División	2016	15	4	0	0	-		15	4
Deportivo Lara	Venezuelan Primera División	2017	13	3	0	0	-		13	3
Deportivo Hualgayoc	Segunda División	2018	23	14	-		-		23	14
UTC Cajamarca	Liga 1	2019	31	8	2	1	2	1	35	10
UTC Cajamarca	Liga 1	2024	32	17	0	0	0	0	32	17
UTC Cajamarca	Liga 1	2025	24	10	0	0	0	0	22	10
UTC Cajamarca	Total		87	35	2	1	2	1	91	37
Academia Cantolao	Liga 1	2020	25	10	-		-		25	10
Sport Huancayo	Liga 1	2021	20	3	1	0	7	1	28	4
Jaguares Córdoba	Categoría Primera A	2022	24	2	4	3	-		28	5
Deportivo Llacuabamba	Liga 2	2023	23	13	-		-		23	13
Career total			275	97	18	6	9	2	302	105
