= Pampas de Hospital District =

Coordinates: 3.6927°S 80.4389°W

Pampas de Hospital
- District
- Interactive map of Pampas de Hospital
- Country: Peru
- Region: Tumbes
- Province: Tumbes
- Founded: June 18, 1962
- Capital: Pampas de Hospital

Government
  - Mayor: Fredy Remberto Rosales Reto

Area
  - Total: 727.75 km^{2} (280.99 sq mi)
- Elevation: 31 m (102 ft)

Population (2005 census)
  - Total: 6,108
  - Density: 8.393/km^{2} (21.74/sq mi)
- Time zone: UTC-5 (PET)
- UBIGEO: 240104

Pampas de Hospital District is one of the six districts of the province Tumbes in Peru.
