= Cultural Huracán =

- Full name: Club Deportivo Cultural Huracán
- Founded: September 4, 1944; 81 years ago
- Ground: Estadio Manuel Eloy Molina Robles; Ayacucho, Peru
- Capacity: 7,500
- League: Copa Perú
| Home colours | Away colours |

Club Deportivo Cultural Huracán (sometimes referred as Cultural Huracán) is a Peruvian football club, playing in the city of Huanta, Ayacucho, Peru.

== History ==
The Club Deportivo Cultural Huracán was founded on September 4, 1944.

In 2010 Copa Perú, the club qualified to the Provincial Stage, but was eliminated by Sport Contreras and Deportivo Municipal (Iguain).

In 2011 Copa Perú, the club qualified to the Departamental Stage, but was eliminated by Sport Huracán in the Third Stage.

In 2013 Copa Perú, the club qualified to the Provincial Stage, but was eliminated by Sport Huanta, Deportivo Municipal (Santillana) and Deportivo Municipal (Iguain).

== Honours ==
=== Regional ===
- Liga Departamental de Ayacucho:

Winners (1): 2022
Runner-up (1): 1967

- Liga Provincial de Huanta:

Winners (3): 2011, 2022, 2025
Runner-up (1): 2024

- Liga Distrital de Huanta:

Winners (2): 2022, 2026
Runner-up (4): 2010, 2013, 2024, 2025

== See also ==
- List of football clubs in Peru
- Peruvian football league system
