= 2009 Ligas Superiores del Peru =

Ligas Superiores del Peru
- Season: 2009
- Champions: Unión Minas (O); Deportivo Municipal (Huamanga); Deportivo Municipal (Chota); Alianza Universidad; Pomalca; Deportivo Municipal (Yanahuanca); Atlético Grau; Franciscano San Román; Sport Pampas

The 2009 Ligas Superiores, the fifth division of Peruvian football (soccer), was played by variable number teams by Department. The tournaments were played on a home-and-away round-robin basis. The Ligas Superiores was created officially in 2009. For the 2009, they were nine Departmental Confederacies that have determined to adopt them: Arequipa, Ayacucho, Cajamarca, Huánuco, Lambayeque, Pasco, Piura, Puno and Tumbes.

== Liga Superior de Arequipa ==
Pos	Team	Pld	W	D	L	GF	GA	GD	Pts
1	Unión Minas de Orcopampa	18	12	3	3	62	14	+48	39
2	Juventus Corazón	18	11	4	3	33	21	+12	37
3	Deportivo TISUR	18	10	5	3	29	20	+9	35
4	Social Corire	18	10	3	5	33	24	+9	33
5	Aurora	18	8	7	3	40	21	+19	31
6	Sportivo Huracán	18	6	5	7	34	25	+9	23
7	Piérola	17	7	2	8	36	31	+5	23
8	Inclán Sport	18	4	2	12	23	49	−26	14
9	Deportivo Camaná	18	1	5	12	9	45	−36	8
10	Defensor Piérola	17	1	2	14	11	58	−47	5

== Liga Superior de Ayacucho ==
Pos	Team	Pld	W	D	L	GF	GA	GD	Pts
1	Deportivo Municipal (Huamanga)	10	7	3	0	25	9	+16	24
2	Sport Churcampa	10	4	3	3	12	13	−1	15
3	Froebel Deportes	10	2	3	5	12	17	−5	9
4	Los Legendarios Morochucos	10	1	3	6	4	14	−10	6
5	Juventud Gloria/Inti Gas	2	0	0	2	0	13	−13	0

== Liga Superior de Cajamarca ==
Pos	Team	Pld	W	D	L	GF	GA	GD	Pts
1	Deportivo Municipal (Chota)	14	8	1	5	29	19	+10	28
2	Deportivo Municipal (Santa Cruz)	14	9	0	5	22	11	+11	27
3	Unión San Ignacio	14	8	2	4	38	14	+24	26
4	Cultural Volante	14	7	4	3	26	16	+10	25
5	Los Inseparables	14	7	2	5	24	17	+7	23
6	Alianza Industrial	14	6	1	7	26	22	+4	19
7	Defensor Tembladera	14	3	1	10	18	62	−44	10
8	El Inca de Cajamarca	14	1	3	10	12	34	−22	6

== Liga Superior de Huánuco ==
Pos	Team	Pld	W	D	L	GF	GA	GD	Pts
1	Alianza Universidad	16	15	0	1	50	9	+41	45
2	León de Huánuco	16	14	0	2	64	19	+45	42
3	Lolo	16	8	2	6	36	22	+14	26
4	UNAS	16	6	3	7	32	35	−3	21
5	Unión Castillo Grande	16	6	2	8	20	29	−9	20
6	Señor de Chacos	16	5	3	8	28	32	−4	18
7	Deportivo Municipal (Huácar)	16	5	0	11	17	30	−13	15
8	Unión Chaglla	16	5	0	11	21	39	−18	15
9	Unión Bambamarca	16	1	3	12	18	68	−50	6

== Liga Superior de Lambayeque ==
Pos	Team	Pld	W	D	L	GF	GA	GD	Pts
1	Deportivo Pomalca	14	12	2	0	51	11	+40	38
2	Universidad de Chiclayo	14	10	2	2	35	11	+24	32
3	Universidad Señor de Sipán	14	9	3	2	38	11	+27	30
4	Defensor Pueblo Nuevo	14	6	3	5	22	21	+1	21
5	Los Íntimos de Olmos	14	4	2	8	19	38	−19	14
6	José Pardo	14	3	2	9	14	37	−23	11
7	USAT	14	3	1	10	18	32	−14	10
8	Juan Aurich Pastor	14	1	1	12	13	48	−35	4

=== Liguilla ===
Pos	Team	Pld	W	D	L	GF	GA	GD	Pts
1	Deportivo Pomalca	20	15	3	2	63	15	+48	48
2	Universidad de Chiclayo	20	13	4	3	40	16	+24	43
3	Universidad Señor de Sipán	20	12	4	4	44	16	+28	40
4	Defensor Pueblo Nuevo	20	7	3	10	28	30	−2	24

== Liga Superior de Pasco ==
Pos	Team	Pld	W	D	L	GF	GA	GD	Pts
1	Deportivo Municipal (Yanahuanca)	10	9	0	1	28	5	+23	27
2	Unión Minas	10	7	1	2	21	9	+12	22
3	Columna Pasco	9	6	1	2	23	7	+16	19
4	Sport Travieso	10	3	0	7	12	31	−19	9
5	Sociedad de Tiro 28	9	3	0	6	18	23	−5	9
6	Universitario de Yanacancha	10	0	0	10	4	29	−25	0

== Liga Superior de Piura ==
Pos	Team	Pld	W	D	L	GF	GA	GD	Pts
1	Atlético Grau	13	11	2	0	41	9	+32	35
2	Cultural Locuto	13	9	2	2	27	10	+17	29
3	UD Paita	11	6	2	3	24	14	+10	20
4	UNP	11	5	3	3	15	14	+1	18
5	Atlético San Martín	11	3	3	5	13	23	−10	12
6	Alianza Libertad	11	3	0	8	13	31	−18	9
7	Oleoducto Petroperú	12	1	2	9	12	21	−9	5
8	Defensor Malacasí	12	1	2	9	17	36	−19	5

== Liga Superior de Puno ==
Pos	Team	Pld	W	D	L	GF	GA	GD	Pts
1	Franciscano San Román	18	14	0	4	53	12	+41	42
2	Unión Carolina	18	12	5	1	33	11	+22	41
3	San Felipe Volante	18	10	4	4	33	13	+20	34
4	UANCV	18	10	2	6	31	24	+7	32
5	Deportivo Chijichaya	18	8	1	9	26	31	−5	25
6	Alianza Unicachi	18	6	2	10	21	33	−12	20
7	Real Carolino	18	6	4	8	19	26	−7	22
8	Alfonso Ugarte	18	5	2	11	22	36	−14	17
9	Deportivo Municipal (Pomata)	18	4	4	10	14	32	−18	16
10	Atlético Estudiantes de Huancané	18	3	2	13	17	48	−31	11

== Liga Superior de Tumbes ==
Pos	Team	Pld	W	D	L	GF	GA	GD	Pts
1	Sport Pampas	10	7	2	1	26	3	+23	23
2	Sporting Pizarro	10	6	4	0	15	3	+12	22
3	Deportivo Pacífico	10	3	3	4	9	9	0	12
4	Deportivo Municipal (Papayal)	10	3	2	5	14	20	−6	11
5	Sport Buenos Aires	10	2	4	4	11	15	−4	10
6	Santa Fé	10	1	1	8	8	33	−25	4
