= 2011 Ligas Superiores del Peru =

Ligas Superiores del Peru
- Season: 2011
- Champions: Los Caimanes; Defensor Politecnico; Oleoducto Petroperú; Sport Buenos Aires; UNASAM; UTC

The 2011 Ligas Superiores, the fifth division of Peruvian football (soccer), will be played by variable number teams by Departament. The tournaments will be played on a home-and-away round-robin basis.

== Liga Superior de Áncash ==
Pos	Team	Pld	W	D	L	GF	GA	GD	Pts	
1	UNASAM	22	16	5	1	51	8	+43	53	2011 Liga Departamental de Áncash
2	Universidad San Pedro	22	14	5	3	65	17	+48	47	2011 Liga Departamental de Áncash
3	Unión Juventud	22	13	5	4	63	35	+28	44	
4	Sport Rosario	22	12	2	8	39	37	+2	38	
5	Cultural Casma	22	11	2	9	59	45	+14	35	
6	Juventud La Unión	22	11	2	9	46	33	+13	35	
7	Deportivo Cushín	22	10	1	11	33	49	−16	31	
8	Sider Perú	22	7	1	14	37	40	−3	22	
9	Barrios Altos de Carhuaz	21	6	3	12	23	42	−19	21	
10	Juventud Tambo Real	22	6	3	13	26	59	−33	21	
11	Escuela Minas de Recuay	22	5	3	14	25	50	−25	18	
12	Juventud Santa Rosa	21	3	2	16	24	77	−53	11	

== Liga Superior de Cajamarca ==
Pos	Team	Pld	W	D	L	GF	GA	GD	Pts	
1	UTC	9	5	2	2	14	4	+10	17	2011 Liga Departamental de Cajamarca
2	Cultural Volante	9	5	2	2	11	9	+2	17	2011 Liga Departamental de Cajamarca
3	Deportivo Municipal (Chota)	9	4	1	4	9	9	0	13	
4	Los Inseparables	9	4	1	4	5	5	0	13	
5	Sport Universitario	8	1	5	2	5	6	−1	8	
6	Carniche	8	1	1	6	4	15	−11	4	

=== Final ===
Team 1	Score	Team 2
UTC	1–0	Cultural Volante

== Liga Superior del Callao ==
=== Serie A ===
Pos	Team	Pld	W	D	L	GF	GA	GD	Pts
1	Atlético Pilsen Callao	3	2	1	0	15	3	+12	7
2	Nuevo Callao	3	2	1	0	6	0	+6	7
3	Somos Aduanas	3	1	0	2	5	11	−6	3
4	María Auxiliadora	3	0	0	3	3	15	−12	0

=== Serie B ===
Pos	Team	Pld	W	D	L	GF	GA	GD	Pts
1	ADEBAMI	3	2	1	0	12	4	+8	7
2	Unión Deportiva Los Próceres	3	1	1	1	3	2	+1	4
3	Cultural Centella	3	1	0	2	4	9	−5	3
4	Juventud La Perla	3	1	0	2	4	8	−4	3

=== Semifinals ===
Team 1	Score	Team 2
Atlético Pilsen Callao	2–1	Unión Deportiva Los Próceres
ADEBAMI	3–2	Nuevo Callao

== Liga Superior de Lambayeque ==
Pos	Team	Pld	W	D	L	GF	GA	GD	Pts	
1	Los Caimanes	13	13	0	0	59	3	+56	39	2011 Liga Departamental de Lambayeque
2	Universitarios de Illimo	13	10	1	2	36	12	+24	31	2011 Liga Departamental de Lambayeque
3	Defensor Cabrera	13	8	1	4	30	16	+14	25	
4	José Pardo	13	7	3	3	31	20	+11	24	
5	Unión Tumán de Deportes	13	4	1	8	22	32	−10	13	
6	Juventud La Joya	13	4	1	8	18	34	−16	13	
7	Universidad de Chiclayo	13	2	1	10	14	35	−21	7	
8	Dínamo	13	0	0	13	2	62	−60	0	

== Liga Superior de Piura ==
Pos	Team	Pld	W	D	L	GF	GA	GD	Pts	
1	Oleoducto Petroperú	3	2	1	0	7	4	+3	7	2011 Liga Departamental de Piura
2	Estrella Roja	3	2	0	1	7	2	+5	6	2011 Liga Departamental de Piura
3	UNP	3	1	1	1	5	5	0	4	
4	Ignacio Merino	3	0	0	3	1	9	−8	0	

== Liga Superior de Puno ==
Pos	Team	Pld	W	D	L	GF	GA	GD	Pts	
1	Defensor Politécnico	13	12	0	1	41	9	+32	36	2011 Liga Departamental de Puno
2	Franciscano San Román	14	9	4	1	25	8	+17	31	2011 Liga Departamental de Puno
3	Diablos Rojos	13	6	3	4	23	15	+8	21	
4	Binacional	11	4	2	5	15	22	−7	14	
5	Defensor Sandía	12	4	4	4	10	19	−9	16	
6	UANCV	13	2	4	7	16	25	−9	10	
7	Unión Carolina	13	1	4	8	10	29	−19	7	
8	Alfonso Ugarte	13	1	3	9	11	24	−13	6	

== Liga Superior de Tumbes ==
Pos	Team	Pld	W	D	L	GF	GA	GD	Pts	
1	Sport Buenos Aires	4	4	0	0	8	1	+7	12	2011 Liga Departamental de Tumbes
2	UNT	4	4	0	0	14	2	+12	12	2011 Liga Departamental de Tumbes
3	Deportivo Municipal (Papayal)	5	2	1	2	11	8	+3	7	
4	Independiente Tumbes	4	2	0	2	4	7	−3	6	
5	Santa Fé	5	1	1	3	2	7	−5	4	
6	Sport Pampas	4	0	2	2	4	7	−3	2	
7	Deportivo Pacífico	4	0	0	4	1	12	−11	0	

=== Final ===
Team 1	Score	Team 2
Sport Buenos Aires	1–1 (4–2 p)	UNT
