= 2012 Ligas Superiores del Peru =

Ligas Superiores del Peru
- Season: 2012
- Champions: Alfonso Ugarte; Juana & Victor; Sporting Pizarro; Universidad Señor de Sipán

The 2012 Ligas Superiores, the fifth division of Peruvian football (soccer), will be played by variable number teams by Departament. The tournaments will be played on a home-and-away round-robin basis.

== Liga Superior del Callao ==
=== Group A ===
Pos	Team	Pld	W	D	L	GF	GA	GD	Pts
1	América Callao	3	1	1	1	2	1	+1	4
2	José Gálvez	3	1	1	1	3	2	+1	4
3	Nuevo Callao	3	1	1	1	2	3	−1	4
4	Atlético Pilsen Callao	3	1	1	1	3	4	−1	4

==== Tiebreaker ====
Teams			Scores		
1st leg home team	Points	2nd leg home team	1st leg	2nd leg	Pen.
América Callao	3:0	Atlético Pilsen Callao	2–1	–	–
América Callao	:	José Gálvez	–	–	–

=== Group B ===
Pos	Team	Pld	W	D	L	GF	GA	GD	Pts
1	Juventud La Perla	2	2	0	0	3	0	+3	6
2	Cultural Centella	2	1	0	1	5	1	+4	3
3	Somos Aduanas	2	0	0	2	0	7	−7	0

== Liga Superior de Lambayeque ==
Pos	Team	Pld	W	D	L	GF	GA	GD	Pts
1	Universidad Señor de Sipán	5	3	1	1	7	3	+4	10
2	Unión Tumán de Deportes	5	2	2	1	6	4	+2	8
3	José Pardo	5	2	1	2	4	6	−2	7
4	Flamengo	5	1	3	1	7	6	+1	6
5	Juventud La Joya	4	1	1	2	4	6	−2	4
6	Deportivo Pomalca (R)	0	0	0	0	0	0	0	0
7	Olmos (R)	1	0	0	1	0	3	−3	0

(R) Retired

== Liga Superior de Piura ==
Pos	Team	Pld	W	D	L	GF	GA	GD	Pts
1	Juana & Victor	7	6	0	1	17	6	+11	18
2	Carlos Concha (Talara)	7	5	0	2	14	11	+3	15
3	Cosmos (R)	7	3	1	3	11	7	+4	10
4	Ignacio Merino (R)	7	3	0	4	16	12	+4	9
5	Miguel Grau (Talara) (R)	7	2	1	4	12	19	−7	7
6	Juan de Mori (R)	7	1	0	6	2	17	−15	3

(R) Retired

== Liga Superior de Puno ==
Pos	Team	Pld	W	D	L	GF	GA	GD	Pts
1	Alfonso Ugarte	12	11	1	0	39	3	+36	34
2	Binacional	11	6	3	2	16	7	+9	21
3	Racing (Cuyocuyo)	12	4	5	3	12	14	−2	17
4	Defensor Politécnico	12	5	1	6	21	30	−9	16
5	Deportivo Universitario	12	4	2	6	13	20	−7	14
6	Huracán San Francisco	11	2	2	7	9	18	−9	8
7	Diablos Rojos	10	0	2	8	5	23	−18	2

== Liga Superior de Tumbes ==
=== First stage ===
Pos	Team	Pld	W	D	L	GF	GA	GD	Pts
1	Sporting Pizarro	4	3	0	1	15	3	+12	9
2	UNT	4	3	0	1	9	4	+5	9
3	Sport Pampas	4	3	0	1	9	5	+4	9
4	Teófilo Cubillas	4	2	0	2	7	10	−3	6
5	Deportivo Pacífico	4	1	0	3	7	13	−6	3
6	Independiente de Tumbes (R)	4	0	0	4	1	13	−12	0

(R) Retired

=== Final stage ===
Pos	Team	Pld	W	D	L	GF	GA	GD	Pts
1	Sporting Pizarro	2	2	0	0	7	1	+6	6
2	Sport Pampas	2	1	0	1	3	3	0	3
3	UNT	2	0	0	2	2	8	−6	0
