= 2010 Ligas Superiores del Peru =

Ligas Superiores del Peru
- Season: 2010
- Champions: Sportivo Huracán; Comerciantes Unidos; Pilsen Callao; Deportivo Municipal (La Convención); Bella Durmiente; Pomalca; Unión Minas; Atlético Grau; Alfonso Ugarte; Sporting Pizarro

The 2010 Ligas Superiores, the fifth division of Peruvian football (soccer), will be played by variable number teams by Department. The tournaments will be played on a home-and-away round-robin basis. For the 2010, they are nine the Departmental Confederacies that have determined to adopt them: Arequipa, Cajamarca, Callao, Cusco, Huánuco, Lambayeque, Pasco, Piura, Puno and Tumbes.

The Liga Departamental de Ayacucho decided the suspension of the Liga Superior de Ayacucho for this season 2010 by the lack of participants and because the tournament has lost the force of previous seasons due to the good actions of Inti Gas Deportes in the Primera División Peruana.

== Liga Superior de Arequipa ==
Pos	Team	Pld	W	D	L	GF	GA	GD	Pts
1	Sportivo Huracán	13	10	3	0	36	11	+25	33
2	Aurora	13	8	3	2	34	16	+18	27
3	Unión Salaverry	13	8	3	2	26	10	+16	27
4	Atlético Mollendo	13	8	1	4	28	17	+11	25
5	Juventus Corazón	13	7	1	5	18	22	−4	22
6	Social Corire	13	4	2	7	15	21	−6	14
7	Cerrito de Los Libres	13	4	1	8	18	28	−10	13
8	Saetas de Oro	13	3	2	8	15	21	−6	11
9	Juvenil Andino	13	2	4	7	15	32	−17	10
10	Piérola	13	0	2	11	11	36	−25	2

=== Liguilla ===
Pos	Team	Pld	W	D	L	GF	GA	GD	Pts
1	Sportivo Huracán	3	2	1	0	7	2	+5	7
2	Aurora	3	2	0	1	6	4	+2	6
3	Atlético Mollendo	3	1	0	2	4	6	−2	3
4	Unión Salaverry	3	0	1	2	0	5	−5	1

== Liga Superior de Cajamarca ==
Pos	Team	Pld	W	D	L	GF	GA	GD	Pts
1	Comerciantes Unidos	16	12	2	2	35	8	+27	38
2	Deportivo Municipal (San Ignacio)	16	11	1	4	33	11	+22	34
3	Cultural Volante	16	11	1	4	27	11	+16	34
4	Deportivo Municipal (Chota)	16	9	1	6	29	21	+8	28
5	Los Inseparables	16	8	2	6	27	20	+7	26
6	El Inca de Cajamarca	16	7	2	7	23	21	+2	23
7	Descendencia Michiquillay	13	4	0	9	16	34	−18	12
8	Morro Solar de Jaén	15	2	2	11	15	41	−26	8
9	Alianza Industrial	15	1	1	13	7	44	−37	4

=== Playoff ===
Team 1	Agg.	Team 2	1st leg	2nd leg
Cultural Volante	1-0	Deportivo Municipal (San Ignacio)	1-0	-

== Liga Superior del Callao ==
=== Quarterfinals ===
Team 1	Agg.	Team 2	1st leg	2nd leg
Juventud La Perla	1-2	María Auxiliadora	1-0	0-2
Atlético Pilsen Callao	7-4	Unión Deportiva Los Próceres	2-0	5-4
José López Pazos	4-2	Cultural Centella	3-0	1-2

=== Semifinals ===
Team 1	Agg.	Team 2	1st leg	2nd leg
Juventud La Perla	0-4	Atlético Pilsen Callao	0-4	-
José López Pazos	3-0	María Auxiliadora	3-0	-

=== Finals ===
Team 1	Agg.	Team 2	1st leg	2nd leg
José López Pazos	-	Atlético Pilsen Callao	-	-

== Liga Superior de Cusco ==
Pos	Team	Pld	W	D	L	GF	GA	GD	Pts
1	Deportivo Municipal (La Convención)	19	16	2	1	41	6	+35	50
2	Humberto Luna	19	15	1	3	51	17	+34	46
3	Cienciano Junior	19	9	3	7	33	22	+11	30
4	Los Heraldos de Uchurcarcco	18	8	3	7	26	27	−1	27
5	Unión Pumacahuina	19	6	5	8	41	33	+8	23
6	Deportivo Municipal (Espinar)	17	7	4	6	16	19	−3	25
7	Deportivo Municipal (Yanaoca)	16	5	1	10	20	30	−10	16
8	Inka Ollantay	18	5	2	11	18	31	−13	17
9	Universidad Andina del Cusco	18	5	2	11	17	40	−23	17
10	Estrella Junior	18	2	3	13	25	58	−33	9

== Liga Superior de Huánuco ==
Pos	Team	Pld	W	D	L	GF	GA	GD	Pts
1	Bella Durmiente	7	4	1	2	10	7	+3	13
2	Cosmos de Ripán	7	4	1	2	6	2	+4	13
3	Alianza Universidad	7	3	1	3	9	5	+4	10
4	Deportivo Municipal (Huácar)	7	1	4	2	8	12	−4	7
5	Deportivo Auragshay	7	1	3	3	5	8	−3	6

=== Liguilla ===
Pos	Team	Pld	W	D	L	GF	GA	GD	Pts
1	Bella Durmiente	2	2	0	0	4	0	+4	6
2	Alianza Universidad	1	1	0	0	4	0	+4	3
3	Cosmos de Ripán	1	0	0	1	0	2	−2	0
4	Deportivo Municipal (Huácar)	2	0	0	2	0	6	−6	0

==== Playoff ====
Team 1	Agg.	Team 2	1st leg	2nd leg
Bella Durmiente	2-4	Alianza Universidad	1-0	1-4

== Liga Superior de Lambayeque ==
Pos	Team	Pld	W	D	L	GF	GA	GD	Pts
1	Deportivo Pomalca	7	6	0	1	34	3	+31	18
2	Universidad Señor de Sipán	7	4	2	1	28	4	+24	14
3	Defensor Cabrera	7	4	1	2	14	11	+3	13
4	José Pardo	7	4	1	2	10	9	+1	13
5	Universidad de Chiclayo	7	3	1	3	8	13	−5	10
6	Unión Tumán de Deportes	7	2	0	5	10	30	−20	6
7	Dínamo	7	1	1	5	3	18	−15	4
8	USAT	7	1	0	6	5	24	−19	3

=== Liguilla ===
Pos	Team	Pld	W	D	L	GF	GA	GD	Pts
1	Deportivo Pomalca	11	10	0	1	44	4	+40	30
2	Universidad Señor de Sipán	12	7	2	3	37	7	+30	23
3	Defensor Cabrera	12	4	2	6	17	22	−5	14
4	José Pardo	11	4	2	5	13	21	−8	14

== Liga Superior de Pasco ==
Pos	Team	Pld	W	D	L	GF	GA	GD	Pts
1	Unión Minas	10	7	2	1	27	3	+24	23
2	Sport Ticlacayán	9	7	2	0	36	5	+31	23
3	Columna Pasco	9	5	0	4	20	10	+10	15
4	Túpac Amaru de Vicco	10	3	1	6	13	27	−14	10
5	Sociedad de Tiro 28	8	2	0	6	4	27	−23	6
6	Sport Travieso	6	1	1	4	7	11	−4	4
7	Deportivo Municipal (Yanahuanca)	1	0	0	1	0	3	−3	0

== Liga Superior de Piura ==
Pos	Team	Pld	W	D	L	GF	GA	GD	Pts
1	Atlético Grau	10	8	1	1	36	9	+27	25
2	Cultural Locuto	10	6	1	3	16	12	+4	19
3	UNP	10	3	3	4	14	16	−2	12
4	Olimpia	10	3	2	5	11	16	−5	11
5	Oleoducto Petroperú	10	1	4	5	10	14	−4	7
6	Defensor Malacasí	10	1	1	8	10	26	−16	4

== Liga Superior de Puno ==
Pos	Team	Pld	W	D	L	GF	GA	GD	Pts
1	Alianza Unicachi	20	13	5	2	49	13	+36	44
2	Unión Carolina	20	12	6	2	41	16	+25	42
3	Unión Fuerza Minera	20	11	5	4	31	15	+16	38
4	Franciscano San Román	20	13	3	4	44	17	+27	42
5	Alfonso Ugarte	20	13	3	4	42	22	+20	42
6	Racing (Cuyo Cuyo)	20	9	7	4	28	19	+9	34
7	San Felipe Volante	19	3	5	11	16	42	−26	14
8	Deportivo Municipal (Pomata)	20	3	3	14	9	52	−43	12
9	UANCV	19	2	6	11	20	38	−18	12
10	Deportivo Chijichaya	19	2	4	13	14	41	−27	10
11	Real Carolino	19	1	5	13	18	40	−22	8

=== Pentagonal ===
Pos	Team	Pld	W	D	L	GF	GA	GD	Pts
1	Alfonso Ugarte	8	4	3	1	9	6	+3	15
2	Unión Fuerza Minera	8	3	3	2	13	8	+5	12
3	Alianza Unicachi	8	2	6	0	7	4	+3	12
4	Unión Carolina	8	2	2	4	7	14	−7	8
5	Franciscano San Román	8	1	2	5	7	11	−4	5

== Liga Superior de Tumbes ==
Pos	Team	Pld	W	D	L	GF	GA	GD	Pts
1	Sporting Pizarro	6	4	1	1	12	5	+7	13
2	Sport Buenos Aires	6	3	2	1	13	6	+7	11
3	Deportivo Municipal (Papayal)	6	3	1	2	12	8	+4	10
4	Sport Pampas	6	2	2	2	10	6	+4	8
5	Deportivo Pacífico	6	2	1	3	10	11	−1	7
6	Barza Sporting	6	2	0	4	6	15	−9	6
7	Santa Fé de San Jacinto	6	1	1	4	10	22	−12	4

=== Semifinals ===
Team 1	Agg.	Team 2	1st leg	2nd leg
Deportivo Pacífico	2-0	Deportivo Municipal (Papayal)	2-0	-
Sport Buenos Aires	1-1 (5-4)p	Sport Pampas	1-1	-

=== Liguilla Final ===
Team 1	Agg.	Team 2	1st leg	2nd leg
Deportivo Pacífico	1-1 (4-3)p	Sport Pampas	1-1	-

=== Final ===
Team 1	Agg.	Team 2	1st leg	2nd leg
Sporting Pizarro	3-1	Deportivo Pacífico	3-1	-

Last Update: June 19, 2010
Source: Copa Peru
