= 2013 Ligas Superiores del Peru =

Ligas Superiores del Peru
- Season: 2013
- Champions: Atlético Grau; Sport San Martín; Juventud La Perla; Universidad Señor de Sipán

The 2013 Ligas Superiores, the fifth division of Peruvian football (soccer), was played on a home-and-away round-robin basis.

== Liga Superior del Callao ==
Pos	Team	Pld	W	D	L	GF	GA	GD	Pts
1	Márquez	2	2	0	0	4	0	+4	6
2	Juventud La Perla	2	1	0	1	6	1	+5	3
3	Nuevo Callao	2	1	0	1	2	4	−2	3
4	Somos Aduanas	2	0	0	2	1	8	−7	0

== Liga Superior de Lambayeque ==
Pos	Team	Pld	W	D	L	GF	GA	GD	Pts
1	Willy Serrato	7	5	2	0	24	5	+19	17
2	Universidad Señor de Sipán	7	5	2	0	25	1	+24	17
3	Cruz de Chalpón	7	4	1	2	13	5	+8	13
4	Flamengo	7	4	1	2	12	6	+6	13
5	Juventud La Joya	7	3	0	4	9	19	−10	9
6	Unión Tumán de Deportes	7	2	0	5	11	22	−11	6
7	Deportivo Pomalca	7	1	1	5	7	14	−7	4
8	José Pardo (R)	7	0	1	6	2	31	−29	1

(R) Retired

=== Liguilla ===
Pos	Team	Pld	W	D	L	GF	GA	GD	Pts
1	Universidad Señor de Sipán	10	7	3	0	35	3	+32	24
2	Willy Serrato	10	6	3	1	32	8	+24	21
3	Flamengo	10	6	1	3	15	11	+4	19
4	Cruz de Chalpón	10	4	1	5	13	16	−3	13

== Liga Superior de Piura ==
Pos	Team	Pld	W	D	L	GF	GA	GD	Pts
1	Atlético Grau	4	4	0	0	13	4	+9	12
2	José Olaya (Paita)	3	2	0	1	5	4	+1	6
3	Juana & Victor	3	1	1	1	7	4	+3	4
4	Jorge Chávez (Sullana)	3	0	1	2	3	5	−2	1
5	Cosmos	3	0	0	3	2	13	−11	0

== Liga Superior de Tumbes ==
Pos	Team	Pld	W	D	L	GF	GA	GD	Pts
1	Sport San Martín	7	6	0	1	23	5	+18	18
2	José Chiroque Cielo	7	5	0	2	13	9	+4	15
3	Sport Pampas	7	4	0	3	19	11	+8	12
4	UNT	7	3	1	3	9	7	+2	10
5	Defensor San José	6	3	0	3	11	8	+3	9
6	Teófilo Cubillas	6	2	0	4	11	19	−8	6
7	Deportivo Pacífico	6	2	0	4	5	16	−11	6
8	Sport Buenos Aires (R)	6	0	1	5	2	18	−16	1

(R) Retired
