= 2014 Ligas Superiores del Peru =

Ligas Superiores del Peru
- Season: 2014
- Champions: ADEBAMI; José Chiroque Cielo; La Nueva Alianza; Atlético Grau

The 2014 Ligas Superiores, the fifth division of Peruvian football (soccer), was played by variable number teams by Departament. The tournaments was played on a home-and-away round-robin basis.

== Liga Superior del Callao ==
=== Serie A ===
Pos	Team	Pld	W	D	L	GF	GA	GD	Pts
1	ADEBAMI	2	2	0	0	4	1	+3	6
2	Somos Aduanas	1	0	0	1	1	2	−1	0
3	Atlético Chalaco	1	0	0	1	0	2	−2	0

=== Serie B ===
Pos	Team	Pld	W	D	L	GF	GA	GD	Pts
1	Juventud La Perla	1	1	0	0	5	0	+5	3
2	Nuevo Callao	1	0	0	1	0	5	−5	0

== Liga Superior de Lambayeque ==
Pos	Team	Pld	W	D	L	GF	GA	GD	Pts
1	La Nueva Alianza	9	6	3	0	43	10	+33	21
2	Cruz de Chalpón	9	5	2	2	24	11	+13	17
3	Flamengo	9	5	1	3	16	17	−1	16
4	Universidad Señor de Sipán	9	4	3	2	26	11	+15	15
5	Juventud La Joya	9	1	1	7	13	49	−36	4
6	Unión Tumán de Deportes	9	0	2	7	9	33	−24	2

== Liga Superior de Piura ==
=== Serie A ===
Pos	Team	Pld	W	D	L	GF	GA	GD	Pts
1	Juana & Víctor	4	1	3	0	5	4	+1	6
2	Alianza Atlético	4	1	2	1	4	3	+1	5
3	Atlético Fronterizo	4	1	1	2	3	8	−5	4

=== Serie B ===
Pos	Team	Pld	W	D	L	GF	GA	GD	Pts
1	Atlético Grau	6	4	1	1	9	2	+7	13
2	Jorge Chávez (Sullana)	6	3	1	2	8	3	+5	10
3	Unión Deportivo Tablazo	6	3	1	2	7	5	+2	10
4	José Olaya (Paita)	6	0	1	5	0	14	−14	1

=== Semifinals ===
Teams			Scores		
1st leg home team	Points	2nd leg home team	1st leg	2nd leg	Pen.
Alianza Atlético	1:4	Atlético Grau	0–3	3–3	–
Jorge Chávez (Sullana)	2:2	Juana & Víctor	1–1	1–1	5–4

== Liga Superior de Tumbes ==
=== Serie A ===
Pos	Team	Pld	W	D	L	GF	GA	GD	Pts
1	Sport Pampas	3	2	1	0	8	1	+7	7
2	José Chiroque Cielo	3	2	1	0	6	3	+3	7
3	Deportivo Pacífico	3	1	0	2	2	6	−4	3
4	Unión Deportiva Chulucanas	3	0	0	3	2	8	−6	0

=== Serie B ===
Pos	Team	Pld	W	D	L	GF	GA	GD	Pts
1	Sporting Pizarro	4	3	1	0	9	2	+7	10
2	UNT	4	3	0	1	11	3	+8	9
3	Sport San Martín	4	2	0	2	7	5	+2	6
4	Defensor San José	4	1	1	2	14	11	+3	4
5	Teófilo Cubillas	4	0	0	4	1	21	−20	0

=== Cuadragunlar Final ===
Pos	Team	Pld	W	D	L	GF	GA	GD	Pts
1	José Chiroque Cielo	2	2	0	0	5	0	+5	6
2	Sporting Pizarro	2	2	0	0	5	2	+3	6
3	UNT	2	0	0	2	1	5	−4	0
4	Sport Pampas	2	0	0	2	1	5	−4	0
