= 2015 Ligas Superiores del Peru =

Ligas Superiores del Peru
- Season: 2015
- Champions: Juventud La Perla; La Nueva Alianza; Defensor La Bocana; Cristal Tumbes

The 2015 Ligas Superiores, the fifth division of Peruvian football (soccer), will be played by variable number teams by Departament. The tournaments will be played on a home-and-away round-robin basis.

== Liga Superior del Callao ==
Pos	Team	Pld	W	D	L	GF	GA	GD	Pts
1	Juventud La Perla	2	2	0	0	8	1	+7	6
2	Somos Aduanas	1	0	0	1	1	4	−3	0
3	Atlético Chalaco	1	0	0	1	0	4	−4	0

== Liga Superior de Lambayeque ==
Pos	Team	Pld	W	D	L	GF	GA	GD	Pts
1	La Nueva Alianza	8	5	2	1	18	4	+14	17
2	Alianza Vista Alegre	7	4	2	1	28	5	+23	14
3	San Lorenzo	7	4	2	1	8	6	+2	14
4	Universidad Señor de Sipán	8	4	1	3	16	12	+4	13
5	Cruz de Chalpón	8	3	0	5	15	15	0	9
6	Defensor Cabrera	8	1	1	6	7	33	−26	4
7	Sport Boys (Tumán)	8	1	2	5	6	23	−17	2

== Liga Superior de Piura ==
=== Serie A ===
Pos	Team	Pld	W	D	L	GF	GA	GD	Pts
1	Escuela Piuranitos	7	6	1	0	28	2	+26	19
2	Atlético Grau	7	3	2	2	12	12	0	11
3	Jorge Chávez (Sullana)	7	1	4	2	5	9	−4	7
4	Atlético Fronterizo	8	1	3	4	4	18	−14	6
5	Melgar de Chulucanas	7	1	2	4	3	11	−8	5

=== Serie B ===
Pos	Team	Pld	W	D	L	GF	GA	GD	Pts
1	Defensor La Bocana	7	6	1	0	20	1	+19	19
2	Juana & Víctor	7	4	2	1	15	6	+9	14
3	Estrella Roja de La Unión	7	3	1	3	10	11	−1	10
4	José Olaya (Paita) (R)	6	2	1	3	8	12	−4	7
5	Olger Jara (R)	8	0	1	7	2	22	−20	1

(R) Retired

=== Semifinals ===
Teams			Scores		
1st leg home team	Points	2nd leg home team	1st leg	2nd leg	Pen.
Escuela Piuranitos	6:0	Juana & Víctor	1–0	2–1	–
Atlético Grau	1:4	Defensor La Bocana	0–0	1–2	–

=== Final ===
Teams			Scores		
1st leg home team	Points	2nd leg home team	1st leg	2nd leg	Pen.
Defensor La Bocana	3:0	Escuela Piuranitos	1–0	–	–

== Liga Superior de Tumbes ==
=== Serie A ===
Pos	Team	Pld	W	D	L	GF	GA	GD	Pts
1	Sport San Martín	3	3	0	0	8	1	+7	9
2	Defensor San José	3	2	0	1	9	1	+8	6
3	Sporting Pizarro	3	1	0	2	5	8	−3	3
4	Teófilo Cubillas	3	0	0	3	0	12	−12	0

=== Serie B ===
Pos	Team	Pld	W	D	L	GF	GA	GD	Pts
1	Cristal Tumbes	3	3	0	0	18	2	+16	9
2	José Chiroque Cielo	3	2	0	1	6	3	+3	6
3	UNT	3	1	0	2	2	6	−4	3
4	Deportivo Pacífico	3	0	0	3	2	17	−15	0

=== Cuadrangular Final ===
Pos	Team	Pld	W	D	L	GF	GA	GD	Pts
1	Cristal Tumbes	3	3	0	0	18	2	+16	9
2	José Chiroque Cielo	3	2	0	1	9	5	+4	6
3	Defensor San José	3	1	0	2	4	15	−11	3
4	Sport San Martín	3	0	0	3	3	12	−9	0
