= 2010 Copa Perú =

Copa Perú
- Season: 2010
- Champions: Unión Comercio

The 2010 Copa Perú season (Spanish: Copa Perú 2010), the promotion tournament of Peruvian football, started on February.

The tournament has 5 stages. The first four stages are played as mini-league round-robin tournaments, except for third stage in region IV, which is played as a knockout stage. The final stage features two knockout rounds and a final four-team group stage to determine the two promoted teams.

The 2010 Peru Cup started with the District Stage (Spanish: Etapa Distrital) on February. The next stage was the Provincial Stage (Spanish: Etapa Provincial) which started, on June. The tournament continued with the Departamental Stage (Spanish: Etapa Departamental) on July. The Regional Staged followed. The National Stage (Spanish: Etapa Nacional) started on November. The winner of the National Stage will be promoted to the First Division.

== Department Stage ==
Department Stage: 2010 Ligas Superiores del Peru

The following list shows the teams that qualified for the Regional Stage.

Department	Team	Location
Amazonas	Vencedores del Cenepa	Bagua
Amazonas	Unión Santo Domingo	Chachapoyas
Ancash	La Victoria	Huarmey
Ancash	Juventud Santa Rosa	Recuay
Apurímac	José María Arguedas	Andahuaylas
Apurímac	Cultural Santa Rosa	Andahuaylas
Arequipa	Aurora	Arequipa
Arequipa	Sportivo Huracán	Arequipa
Ayacucho	Froebel Deportes	Ayacucho
Ayacucho	Deportivo Municipal (El Tambo)	Tambo
Cajamarca	Comerciantes Unidos	Cutervo
Cajamarca	Cultural Volante	Bambamarca
Callao	Nuevo Callao	Callao
Callao	Atlético Pilsen Callao	Callao
Cusco	Real Garcilaso	Cusco
Cusco	Humberto Luna	Calca
Huancavelica	Santa Rosa PNP	Huancavelica
Huancavelica	UDA	Huancavelica
Huánuco	Alianza Universidad	Huánuco
Huánuco	Bella Durmiente	Huánuco
Ica	Joe Gutiérrez	Pisco
Ica	Sport Victoria	Ica
Junín	Sport Dos de Mayo	Tarma
Junín	ADT	Tarma
La Libertad	Carlos A. Mannucci	Trujillo
La Libertad	Miguel Grau (Huamachuco)	Huamachuco

Department	Team	Location
Lambayeque	Universidad Señor de Sipán	Lambayeque
Lambayeque	Deportivo Pomalca	Lambayeque
Lima	Deportivo Municipal	Lima
Lima	La Peña Sporting	Lima
Lima	Juventud Barranco	Huacho
Lima	Géminis	Lima
Loreto	Los Tigres	Iquitos
Loreto	UNAP	Iquitos
Madre de Dios	Juventud La Joya	Tambopata
Madre de Dios	MINSA	Tambopata
Moquegua	Atlético Huracán	Moquegua
Moquegua	San Lino de Omate	Omate
Pasco	Sport Ticlacayán	Pasco
Pasco	Unión Minas	Pasco
Piura	Atlético Grau	Piura
Piura	Salesiano	La Unión
Puno	Alianza Unicachi	Yunguyo
Puno	Unión Fuerza Minera	Putina
San Martín	Unión Comercio	Rioja
San Martín	Atlético Belén	Moyobamba
Tacna	Unión Alfonso Ugarte	Tacna
Tacna	Unión Mirave	Tacna
Tumbes	Sporting Pizarro	Tumbes
Tumbes	Defensor San José	Tumbes
Ucayali	Deportivo Hospital	Pucallpa
Ucayali	Atlético Pucallpa	Pucallpa

== Regional Stage ==
Each region had two teams qualify for the next stage. The playoffs only determined the respective regional winners.

=== Region I ===
Region I includes qualified teams from Amazonas, Lambayeque, Tumbes and Piura region.

==== Group A ====
Pos	Team	Pld	W	D	L	GF	GA	GD	Pts	Qualification	GRA	SPP	USS	VCE
1	Atlético Grau	6	4	2	0	12	3	+9	14	National stage		3–1	1–0	6–1
2	Sporting Pizarro	6	2	2	2	5	6	−1	8		0–0		1–0	1–0
3	Universidad Señor de Sipán	5	1	2	2	4	5	−1	5		1–1	2–2		W.O.
4	Vencedores del Cenepa	5	1	0	4	2	9	−7	3		0–1	1–0	0–1	

==== Group B ====
Pos	Team	Pld	W	D	L	GF	GA	GD	Pts	Qualification	DSJ	SAL	POM	USD
1	Defensor San José	6	4	2	0	19	3	+16	14	National stage		5–0	3–0	5–0
2	Salesiano	6	3	1	2	11	10	+1	10		1–1		2–3	3–0
3	Deportivo Pomalca	5	2	1	2	14	10	+4	7		2–2	1–3		8–0
4	Unión Santo Domingo	5	0	0	5	0	21	−21	0 (Note: Unión Santo Domingo penalized -3 points for walkover in its game versus Salesiano.)		0–3	0–2	W.O.	

=== Region II ===
Region II includes qualified teams from Ancash, Cajamarca, La Libertad and San Martín region.

==== Group A ====
Pos	Team	Pld	W	D	L	GF	GA	GD	Pts	Qualification	UCO	CVO	JSR	CAM
1	Unión Comercio	6	5	1	0	17	2	+15	16	National stage		2–1	8–0	3–0
2	Cultural Volante	5	3	0	2	5	3	+2	9		0–1		2–0	W.O.
3	Juventud Santa Rosa	6	2	0	4	5	14	−9	6		1–3	0–1		1–0
4	Carlos A. Mannucci	5	0	1	4	0	8	−8	1 (Note: Carlos A. Mannucci penalized -3 points due to fan violence during their defeat as locals to Volante.)		0–0	0–1	0–3	

==== Group B ====
Pos	Team	Pld	W	D	L	GF	GA	GD	Pts	Qualification	COM	MGH	BEL	LVH
1	Comerciantes Unidos	6	4	2	0	13	6	+7	14	National stage		3–0	2–0	3–2
2	Miguel Grau (Huamachuco)	6	3	1	2	11	11	0	10		3–3		4–1	2–1
3	Atlético Belén	5	1	1	3	3	7	−4	4		0–1	2–0		0–0
4	La Victoria	5	0	2	3	5	8	−3	2		1–1	1–2	W.O.	

=== Region III ===
Region III includes qualified teams from Loreto and Ucayali region.

Pos	Team	Pld	W	D	L	GF	GA	GD	Pts	Qualification	PUC	HOS	LTI	UNA
1	Atlético Pucallpa	6	3	2	1	10	8	+2	11	National stage		0–3	2–1	3–1
2	Deportivo Hospital	6	3	1	2	9	5	+4	10	National stage	0–0		0–1	2–0
3	Los Tigres	5	1	1	3	3	7	−4	4		2–2	3–4		0–0
4	UNAP	6	1	1	4	4	10	−6	4		1–3	1–0	1–2	

=== Region IV ===
Region IV includes qualified teams from Lima and Callao region.

Pos	Team	Pld	W	D	L	GF	GA	GD	Pts	Qualification	GÉM	JVB	MUN	NCA	LPS	APC
1	Géminis	5	4	1	0	9	1	+8	13	National stage		1–0	0–0			
2	Juventud Barranco	5	2	2	1	7	4	+3	8	National stage			0–0	1–1		3–1
3	Deportivo Municipal	5	2	3	0	11	3	+8	7 (Note: Municipal were docked 2 points for failing to pay a former manager Juan José Tan.)					2–1	2–2	
4	Nuevo Callao	5	2	1	2	17	10	+7	7		1–2				6–2	8–3
5	La Peña Sporting	5	1	1	3	7	13	−6	4		0–2	1–3				2–0
6	Atlético Pilsen Callao	5	0	0	5	4	24	−20	0		0–4		0–7			

=== Region V ===
Region V includes qualified teams from Junín, Pasco and Huánuco region.

==== Group A ====
Pos	Team	Pld	W	D	L	GF	GA	GD	Pts	Qualification	ADT	ALI	UMI
1	ADT	4	3	0	1	5	3	+2	9	National stage		1–0	2–0
2	Alianza Universidad	4	2	1	1	6	2	+4	7		3–0		2–0
3	Unión Minas	4	0	1	3	1	7	−6	1		0–2	1–1	

==== Group B ====
Pos	Team	Pld	W	D	L	GF	GA	GD	Pts	Qualification	BDU	SDM	SPT
1	Bella Durmiente	4	3	0	1	6	1	+5	9	National stage		1–0	2–0
2	Sport Dos de Mayo	4	2	1	1	3	1	+2	7		1–0		2–0
3	Sport Ticlacayán	4	0	1	3	0	7	−7	1		0–3	0–0	

==== Regional Final ====
Team 1	Score	Team 2
ADT	2–1	Bella Durmiente

=== Region VI ===
Region VI includes qualified teams from Ayacucho, Huancavelica and Ica region. Two teams qualified from this stage.

==== Group A ====
Pos	Team	Pld	W	D	L	GF	GA	GD	Pts	Qualification	JGU	UDA	FRO
1	Joe Gutiérrez	4	2	2	0	11	5	+6	8	National stage		6–2	3–1
2	UDA	3	1	1	1	4	7	−3	4		1–1		1–0
3	Froebel Deportes	3	0	1	2	2	5	−3	1		1–1	W.O.	

==== Group B ====
Pos	Team	Pld	W	D	L	GF	GA	GD	Pts	Qualification	VIC	SRP	DMT
1	Sport Victoria	4	4	0	0	10	1	+9	12	National stage		3–0	5–0
2	Santa Rosa PNP	4	1	1	2	3	6	−3	4		1–2		1–0
3	Deportivo Municipal (El Tambo)	4	0	1	3	1	7	−6	1		0–1	1–1	

==== Regional Final ====
Team 1	Agg.	Team 2	1st leg	2nd leg
Joe Gutiérrez	1–4	Sport Victoria	1–0	0–4

=== Region VII ===
Region VII includes qualified teams from Arequipa, Moquegua and Tacna region.

==== Group A ====
Pos	Team	Pld	W	D	L	GF	GA	GD	Pts	Qualification	AUR	UAU	HUR
1	Aurora	4	4	0	0	7	0	+7	12	Región VII - Semifinals		3–0	1–0
2	Unión Alfonso Ugarte	4	1	1	2	6	8	−2	4	Región VII - Semifinals	0–2		5–2
3	Atlético Huracán	4	0	1	3	3	8	−5	1		0–1	1–1	

==== Group B ====
Pos	Team	Pld	W	D	L	GF	GA	GD	Pts	Qualification	HUR	UMI	SLO
1	Sportivo Huracán	4	3	1	0	13	2	+11	10	Región VII - Semifinals		3–0	7–1
2	Unión Mirave	4	1	2	1	7	5	+2	5	Región VII - Semifinals	1–1		5–0
3	San Lino de Omate	4	0	1	3	2	15	−13	1		1–2	1–1	

==== Semifinals ====
Team 1	Agg.	Team 2	1st leg	2nd leg
Aurora	4–0	Unión Mirave	2–0	2–0
Unión Alfonso Ugarte	1–3	Sportivo Huracán	1–1	0–2

==== Regional Final ====
Team 1	Score	Team 2
Aurora	0–1	Sportivo Huracán

=== Region VIII ===
Region VIII includes qualified teams from Apurimac, Cusco, Madre de Dios and Puno region.

==== Group A ====
Pos	Team	Pld	W	D	L	GF	GA	GD	Pts	Qualification	APU	CST	HLC	JJT
1	Alianza Unicachi	6	4	1	1	12	3	+9	13	National stage		2–0	2–0	3–0
2	Cultural Santa Rosa	6	3	2	1	15	6	+9	11		2–2		4–2	8–0
3	Humberto Luna	6	3	1	2	7	6	+1	10		1–0	0–0		3–0
4	Juventud La Joya	6	0	0	6	0	19	−19	0 (Note: Juventud La Joya penalized -6 points for two consecutive walkovers, versus Humberto Luna and Alianza Porvenir - Unicachi. After two consecutive walkovers, a team is considered retired from the competition, but points earned against it are still counted.)		0–3	0–1	0–1	

==== Group B ====
Pos	Team	Pld	W	D	L	GF	GA	GD	Pts	Qualification	JMA	GAR	UFM	MIN
1	José María Arguedas	6	4	0	2	14	7	+7	12			3–0	3–2	5–1
2	Real Garcilaso	6	4	0	2	10	8	+2	12	National stage	1–0		4–2	2–0
3	Unión Fuerza Minera	6	3	0	3	12	11	+1	9		1–0	1–3		4–0
4	MINSA	6	1	0	5	5	16	−11	3		2–3	2–0	0–2	

==== Tiebreaker ====
Team 1	Score	Team 2
Real Garcilaso	1–1	José María Arguedas

==== Regional Final ====
Team 1	Score	Team 2
Alianza Unicachi	4–3	Real Garcilaso

== National Stage ==
The National Stage started on November. This stage had two knockout rounds and four-team group stage. The winner was promoted to the 2011 Torneo Descentralizado and the runner-up of the National Stage was promoted to the 2011 Peruvian Segunda División.

Round of 16
Defensor San José	2	0	2 (1)
Unión Comercio	0	2	2 (3)
Atlético Grau	0	4	4
Comerciantes Unidos	3	1	4
Atlético Pucallpa	1	3	4
Juventud Barranco	2	1	3
Deportivo Hospital	0	4	4
Géminis	2	1	3
ADT	4	2	6
Joe Gutiérrez	1	1	2
Bella Durmiente	2	0	2
Sport Victoria	1	1	2
Sportivo Huracán	3	4	7
Real Garcilaso	4	1	5
Alianza Unicachi	4	1	5
Aurora	0	4	4

Quarterfinals
Unión Comercio	2	1	3
Comerciantes Unidos	0	3	3
Atlético Pucallpa	0	1	1
Deportivo Hospital	1	2	3
ADT	4	0	4
Sport Victoria	0	0	0
Sportivo Huracán	0	1	1
Alianza Unicachi	2	4	6

Semifinals
Unión Comercio	2	4	6
Deportivo Hospital	0	1	1
ADT	0	2	2
Alianza Unicachi	3	0	3

Champion & Runner-Up
Unión Comercio	2	2	4
Alianza Unicachi	0	4	4

=== Round of 16 ===
Team 1	Agg.	Team 2	1st leg	2nd leg
Defensor San José	2–2 (1–3 p)	Unión Comercio	2–0	0–2
Atlético Grau	4–4 (a)	Comerciantes Unidos	0–3	4–1
Atlético Pucallpa	4–3	Juventud Barranco	1–2	3–1
Deportivo Hospital	4–3	Géminis	0–2	4–1
ADT	6–2	Joe Gutiérrez	4–1	2–1
Bella Durmiente	2–2 (a)	Sport Victoria	2–1	0–1
Sportivo Huracán	7–5	Real Garcilaso	3–4	4–1
Alianza Unicachi	5–4	Aurora	4–0	1–4

=== Quarterfinals ===
Team 1	Agg.	Team 2	1st leg	2nd leg
Unión Comercio	3–3 (a)	Comerciantes Unidos	2–0	1–3
Atlético Pucallpa	1–3	Deportivo Hospital	0–1	1–2
ADT	4–0	Sport Victoria	4–0	0–0
Sportivo Huracán	1–6	Alianza Unicachi	0–2	1–4

=== Semifinals ===
Team 1	Agg.	Team 2	1st leg	2nd leg
Deportivo Hospital	1–6	Unión Comercio	0–2	1–4
Alianza Unicachi	3–2	ADT	3–0	0–2

=== Final ===
Team 1	Agg.	Team 2	1st leg	2nd leg
Alianza Unicachi	4–4 (a)	Unión Comercio	0–2	4–2

== See also ==
- 2010 Torneo Descentralizado
- 2010 Peruvian Segunda División
