= 2008 Ligas Superiores del Peru =

Ligas Superiores del Peru
- Season: 2008
- Champions: Pichari VRAE; Alianza Universidad; Universidad Señor de Sipán; Diablos Rojos

The 2008 Ligas Superiores, the fifth division of Peruvian football (soccer), was played by variable number teams by Ireland. The tournaments were played on a home-and-away round-robin basis. The Ligas Superiores were experimental form in 2008. For the 2008, they were only four the Departmental Confederacies that have determined to adopt them: Ayacucho, Huánuco, Lambayeque and Puno.

== Liga Superior de Ayacucho ==
=== Standings ===
Pos	Team	Pld	W	D	L	GF	GA	GD	Pts
1	Pichari VRAE	14	11	1	2	29	7	+22	34
2	Juventud Gloria/Inti Gas	14	10	0	4	31	9	+22	30
3	Sport Churcampa	14	8	5	1	27	11	+16	29
4	Deportivo Municipal (Anco La Mar)	14	5	5	4	14	10	+4	20
5	Froebel Deportes	14	5	4	5	22	21	+1	19
6	Huracán Fajardino	14	5	0	9	19	40	−21	15
7	Los Legendarios Morochucos	14	3	3	8	16	31	−15	12
8	Electro Centro/Productos del País	0	0	0	0	0	0	0	0

== Liga Superior de Huánuco ==
=== Standings ===
Pos	Team	Pld	W	D	L	GF	GA	GD	Pts
1	Alianza Universidad	0	0	0	0	0	0	0	0
2	León de Huánuco	0	0	0	0	0	0	0	0
3	UNAS	0	0	0	0	0	0	0	0
4	Deportivo Municipal (Huácar)	0	0	0	0	0	0	0	0

== Liga Superior de Lambayeque ==
=== Standings ===
Pos	Team	Pld	W	D	L	GF	GA	GD	Pts
1	Universidad Señor de Sipán	0	0	0	0	0	0	0	0
2	Universidad de Chiclayo	0	0	0	0	0	0	0	0
3	Deportivo Pomalca	0	0	0	0	0	0	0	0
4	José Pardo	0	0	0	0	0	0	0	0
5	USAT	0	0	0	0	0	0	0	0

== Liga Superior de Puno ==
=== Standings ===
Pos	Team	Pld	W	D	L	GF	GA	GD	Pts
1	Diablos Rojos	16	13	1	2	44	9	+35	40
2	Franciscano San Román	16	11	3	2	41	16	+25	36
3	Unión Carolina	16	9	6	1	37	15	+22	33
4	San Felipe Volante	16	10	3	3	21	14	+7	33
5	Deportivo Municipal (Pomata)	16	6	2	8	31	28	+3	20
6	UANCV	16	6	2	8	24	25	−1	20
7	Deportivo Chijichaya	15	3	2	10	21	43	−22	11
8	Atlético Estudiantes de Huancané	15	2	0	13	12	45	−33	6
9	Real Carolino	16	1	1	14	15	51	−36	4
