= 2016 Ligas Superiores del Peru =

Ligas Superiores del Peru
- Season: 2016
- Champions: Juan Aurich de Chongoyape; Atlético Grau; Independiente de Aguas Verdes

The 2016 Ligas Superiores, the fifth division of Peruvian football (soccer), will be played by variable number teams by Departament. The tournaments will be played on a home-and-away round-robin basis.

== Liga Superior de Lambayeque ==
=== Serie A ===
Pos	Team	Pld	W	D	L	GF	GA	GD	Pts
1	La Nueva Alianza	4	4	0	0	18	1	+17	12
2	Universitario de Tongorrape	4	2	1	1	6	9	−3	7
3	Cruz de Chalpón	4	1	0	3	3	9	−6	3
4	Construcción Civil	4	0	1	3	5	13	−8	1

=== Serie B ===
Pos	Team	Pld	W	D	L	GF	GA	GD	Pts
1	Juan Aurich de Chongoyape	3	3	0	0	15	2	+13	9
2	Defensor Monsefú	3	2	0	1	13	7	+6	6
3	Universidad Señor de Sipán	4	2	0	2	8	6	+2	6
4	Defensor España	4	0	0	4	3	24	−21	0

== Liga Superior de Piura ==
=== Serie A ===
Pos	Team	Pld	W	D	L	GF	GA	GD	Pts
1	Atlético Grau	5	4	1	0	22	4	+18	13
2	Juana & Víctor	5	2	2	1	8	9	−1	8
3	Melgar de Chulucanas	5	1	2	2	6	5	+1	5
4	San Juan	5	0	1	4	18	17	+1	1

=== Serie B ===
Pos	Team	Pld	W	D	L	GF	GA	GD	Pts
1	San Antonio	5	4	1	0	12	1	+11	13
2	Asociación Comerciantes	5	3	1	1	12	4	+8	10
3	Escuela Piuranitos	5	2	0	3	7	11	−4	6
4	Atlético Fronterizo	5	0	0	5	0	15	−15	0

=== Semifinals ===
Teams			Scores		
1st leg home team	Points	2nd leg home team	1st leg	2nd leg	Pen.
Asociación Comerciantes	0:6	Atlético Grau	0–5	W.O.	–
Juana & Víctor	0:6	San Antonio	0–1	0–2	–

=== Final ===
Teams			Scores		
1st leg home team	Points	2nd leg home team	1st leg	2nd leg	Pen.
Atlético Grau	3:0	San Antonio	1–0	–	–

== Liga Superior de Tumbes ==
=== Serie A ===
Pos	Team	Pld	W	D	L	GF	GA	GD	Pts
1	6 de Diciembre	2	2	0	0	13	3	+10	6
2	Independiente Aguas Verdes	2	2	0	0	8	1	+7	6
3	UNT	2	0	0	2	2	8	−6	0
4	Sport San Martín	2	0	0	2	2	13	−11	0

=== Serie B ===
Pos	Team	Pld	W	D	L	GF	GA	GD	Pts
1	José Chiroque Cielo	1	1	0	0	2	0	+2	3
2	Sporting Pizarro	1	0	1	0	3	3	0	1
3	Defensor San José	2	0	1	1	3	5	−2	1

=== Cuadrangular Final ===
Pos	Team	Pld	W	D	L	GF	GA	GD	Pts
1	Independiente Aguas Verdes	3	2	1	0	11	2	+9	7
2	6 de Diciembre	3	1	2	0	6	3	+3	5
3	José Chiroque Cielo	3	1	1	1	8	4	+4	4
4	Defensor San José	3	0	0	3	5	12	−7	0
