= Aurora FC =

Aurora FC may refer to:

- Aurora F.C., a Guatemalan football team
- Aurora FC, a Canadian soccer team
- Minnesota Aurora FC, an American soccer team

== See also ==
- FBC Aurora, a Peruvian football team
- Club Aurora, a Bolivian football team
