= 2000 Torneo Descentralizado =

Torneo Descentralizado
- Season: 2000
- Dates: 5 February 2000 – 12 December 2000
- Champions: Universitario; 24th Primera División title
- Runner up: Sporting Cristal
- Relegated: Deportivo Municipal
- Copa Libertadores: Universitario; Sporting Cristal; Sport Boys
- Copa Merconorte: Alianza Lima; Sporting Cristal; Universitario
- Top goalscorer: Eduardo Esidio (37 goals)

The 2000 season of the Torneo Descentralizado was the 85th season of the top category of Peruvian football (soccer). It was played by 12 teams. The national champion was Universitario.

== Competition modus ==
The national championship was divided into two tournaments, the Torneo Apertura and the Torneo Clausura. Each was played on a home-and-away round-robin basis. The winners of each would play for the national title in a play-off, but since the same club had won both tournaments, it automatically won the national championship.

Following-season Copa Libertadores berths went to the champion, as well as to each of the half-year tournament's runners-up, who held a play-off as a formality to decide the overall season runners-up. The bottom team on the aggregate table was relegated, while the eleventh place team held a promotion play-off against the winner of the Segunda División (Second Division).

== Teams ==
Before the start of the season, Deportivo Pesquero relocated from Chimbote to Huancayo and changed its name to Deportivo Wanka.

=== Team changes ===
Promoted from 1999 Copa Perú	Relegated from 1999 Primera División
▲ Deportivo UPAO (1st)	▼ I.M.I. (12th)

=== Stadia locations ===
Locations of the 2000 Primera División teams

Team	City	Stadium	Capacity
Alianza Atlético	Sullana	Campeones del 36	8,000
Alianza Lima	Lima	Alejandro Villanueva	35,000
Cienciano	Cuzco	Garcilaso	42,056
Deportivo Municipal	Lima	Nacional	45,750
Deportivo UPAO	Trujillo	Mansiche	24,000
Deportivo Wanka	Huancayo	Huancayo	20,000
Juan Aurich	Chiclayo	Elías Aguirre	24,500
Melgar	Arequipa	Mariano Melgar	20,000
Sport Boys	Callao	Miguel Grau	15,000
Sporting Cristal	Lima	San Martín de Porres	18,000
Unión Minas	Cerro de Pasco	Daniel Alcides Carrión	8,000
Universitario	Lima	Monumental	80,093

== Torneo Apertura ==
=== Standings ===
Pos	Team	Pld	W	D	L	GF	GA	GD	Pts	Qualification
1	Universitario	22	13	7	2	39	20	+19	46	Copa Libertadores 2001 First stage
2	Sport Boys	22	11	6	5	36	25	+11	39	Copa Libertadores 2001 First stage
3	Melgar	22	10	6	6	39	27	+12	36	
4	Cienciano	22	10	6	6	31	30	+1	36	
5	Alianza Lima	22	9	7	6	23	22	+1	34	
6	Unión Minas	22	10	3	9	28	23	+5	33	
7	Alianza Atlético	22	8	6	8	28	27	+1	30	
8	Sporting Cristal	22	7	7	8	40	31	+9	28	
9	Deportivo Wanka	22	6	6	10	21	32	−11	24	
10	Juan Aurich	22	3	11	8	21	30	−9	20	
11	Deportivo UPAO	22	4	7	11	24	39	−15	19	
12	Deportivo Municipal	22	2	6	14	24	48	−24	12	

Updated to match(es) played on July 2000. Source: https://www.rsssf.org/tablesp/peru00.html
Rules for classification: 1) points; 2) goal difference; 3) number of goals scored.

=== Results ===
Home \ Away	AAS	ALI	CIE	MUN	UPAO	WAN	MEL	JA	SBA	CRI	MIN	UNI
Alianza Atlético		1–0	3–2	6–2	3–1	1–1	0–0	0–1	2–1	1–1	2–1	2–3
Alianza Lima	0–1		3–1	2–0	2–1	2–2	1–1	3–1	1–0	0–0	2–0	0–2
Cienciano	2–1	0–0		3–3	2–1	2–0	1–2	1–0	1–1	2–2	1–0	2–1
Deportivo Municipal	1–1	1–1	0–1		2–0	3–1	1–4	1–1	0–0	0–4	2–2	1–5
Deportivo UPAO	1–0	1–1	0–1	4–2		1–1	2–1	1–1	1–4	1–0	0–2	0–0
Deportivo Wanka	1–2	0–1	1–3	1–0	1–0		4–2	1–0	0–1	3–1	1–1	1–0
Melgar	2–0	2–0	0–0	3–2	0–0	3–0		3–0	4–0	3–1	1–0	0–0
Juan Aurich	0–0	2–2	2–2	1–0	1–1	1–1	3–2		0–2	3–3	1–1	1–2
Sport Boys	1–1	4–0	2–3	3–1	3–3	3–1	4–2	1–0		1–0	1–0	1–1
Sporting Cristal	3–1	0–1	4–0	2–1	8–3	3–0	0–0	1–1	0–1		3–0	3–3
Unión Minas	2–0	0–1	2–0	1–0	2–1	2–0	4–2	1–0	2–0	4–1		1–2
Universitario	1–0	2–0	2–1	2–1	2–1	0–0	4–2	1–1	2–2	2–0	2–0	

Updated to match(es) played on 2000. Source: RSSSF Peru 2000
Legend: Blue = home team win; Yellow = draw; Red = away team win.

== Torneo Clausura ==
=== Standings ===
Pos	Team	Pld	W	D	L	GF	GA	GD	Pts	Qualification
1	Universitario	22	17	3	2	55	23	+32	54	Copa Libertadores 2001 First stage
2	Sporting Cristal	22	15	5	2	48	24	+24	50	Copa Libertadores 2001 First stage
3	Cienciano	22	10	5	7	47	28	+19	35	
4	Melgar	22	10	3	9	33	28	+5	33	
5	Alianza Atlético	22	9	5	8	36	24	+12	32	
6	Deportivo Wanka	22	9	5	8	36	34	+2	32	
7	Unión Minas	22	9	4	9	33	37	−4	31	
8	Alianza Lima	22	7	7	8	36	33	+3	28	
9	Sport Boys	22	6	7	9	25	25	0	25	
10	Juan Aurich	22	4	5	13	22	50	−28	17	
11	Deportivo Municipal	22	3	7	12	24	43	−19	16	
12	Deportivo UPAO	22	4	3	15	19	50	−31	15	

Updated to match(es) played on December 2000. Source: https://www.rsssf.org/tablesp/peru00.html
Rules for classification: 1) points; 2) goal difference; 3) number of goals scored.

=== Results ===
Home \ Away	AAS	ALI	CIE	MUN	UPAO	WAN	MEL	JA	SBA	CRI	MIN	UNI
Alianza Atlético		3–2	4–1	3–2	1–2	2–0	0–0	2–1	2–1	1–2	4–0	1–1
Alianza Lima	2–1		2–1	0–0	1–1	3–0	4–1	1–1	0–0	1–2	4–0	0–1
Cienciano	5–0	2–0		4–0	2–0	4–2	5–2	7–1	1–1	3–1	0–1	2–3
Deportivo Municipal	1–1	2–3	1–1		1–0	5–4	1–0	1–3	0–0	0–4	3–3	1–2
Deportivo UPAO	2–4	1–5	0–2	0–0		3–1	0–2	1–1	0–3	2–4	3–2	2–3
Deportivo Wanka	2–0	3–2	2–0	4–1	2–0		1–0	4–0	2–0	1–1	0–0	0–0
Melgar	3–1	2–0	1–1	1–0	2–1	4–0		2–1	2–1	1–2	1–2	2–0
Juan Aurich	1–5	1–1	0–0	3–2	0–1	1–1	1–0		0–1	0–7	4–2	1–2
Sport Boys	0–0	2–2	1–2	0–0	4–0	2–0	1–3	2–1		0–1	2–0	0–2
Sporting Cristal	1–1	1–1	3–2	3–2	1–0	1–0	1–1	1–0	2–1		4–2	2–2
Unión Minas	3–0	4–1	1–1	1–0	4–0	0–1	2–1	3–1	2–2	1–2		2–1
Universitario	2–0	4–1	2–1	3–1	5–0	6–2	3–2	5–0	3–1	3–2	2–0	

Updated to match(es) played on 2000. Source: RSSSF Peru 2000
Legend: Blue = home team win; Yellow = draw; Red = away team win.

== Final stages ==
=== Final ===
No final for the championship title was contested after Universitario won both the Apertura and Clausura tournaments, thus automatically becoming national champions.

=== Second place play-off ===
12 December 2000
15:30

Sporting Cristal	2–1	Sport Boys
Roberto Silva 9'; Martín Hidalgo 38'		Carlos Lobatón 18'

Estadio Nacional, Lima
Attendance: 3,621
Referee: Víctor Rivera
Sporting Cristal second place overall

== Aggregate table ==
Pos	Team	Pld	W	D	L	GF	GA	GD	Pts	Qualification or relegation
1	Universitario (C)	44	30	10	4	94	43	+51	100	2001 Copa Libertadores First stage and 2001 Copa Merconorte
2	Sporting Cristal	44	22	12	10	88	55	+33	78	2001 Copa Libertadores First stage and 2001 Copa Merconorte
3	Cienciano	44	20	11	13	78	58	+20	71	
4	Melgar	44	20	9	15	72	55	+17	69	
5	Sport Boys	44	17	13	14	61	50	+11	64	2001 Copa Libertadores First stage
6	Unión Minas	44	19	7	18	61	60	+1	64	
7	Alianza Lima	44	16	14	14	59	55	+4	62	2001 Copa Merconorte
8	Alianza Atlético	44	17	11	16	64	61	+3	62	
9	Deportivo Wanka	44	15	11	18	53	67	−14	56	
10	Juan Aurich	44	7	16	21	43	80	−37	37	
11	Deportivo UPAO (O)	44	8	10	26	43	89	−46	34	Qualification for Promotion/relegation play-off
12	Deportivo Municipal (R)	44	5	13	26	48	91	−43	28	Relegation to 2001 Segunda División

Updated to match(es) played on December 2000. Source:
Rules for classification: 1) points; 2) goal difference; 3) number of goals scored.
(C) Champions; (O) Play-off winners; (R) Relegated

== Promotion/relegation play-off ==
The promotion/relegation play-off was a two-legged series played by the team placing 11th in the 2000 Primera División, Deportivo UPAO and the 2000 Segunda División champion Deportivo Aviación.

13 December 2000
15:30

Deportivo UPAO	3–1	Deportivo Aviación
Rodrigo Saraz 33'; Néstor Mordini 66'; Miguel Huertas 88'		Jerry Tamashiro 79'

Estadio Nacional, Lima
Attendance: 10,000
Referee: Gilberto Hidalgo
Deportivo UPAO remained in Peruvian Primera División (Note: UPAO would sell their first division spot to Sport Coopsol before the 2001 season.)

== Top scorers ==
37 goals

- Eduardo Esidio (Universitario)

19 goals

- Luis A. Bonnet (Cienciano)

15 goals

- Roberto Holsen (Alianza Lima)

13 goals

- James Angulo (Sport Boys)

12 goals

- Piero Alva (Universitario)
- Carlos Juárez (Sporting Cristal)
- Sergio Ibarra (Deportivo Wanka)

== See also ==
- 2000 Peruvian Segunda División
- 2000 Copa Perú
