= 2000 Sporting Cristal season =

Sporting Cristal
2000 season
- Stadium: San Martín de Porres, Lima
- Torneo Descentralizado: Torneo Apertura: Eighth (8°); Torneo Clausura: Second (2°); Aggregate Table: Second (2°); Final Runner-up: Runner-up (winner); Second National (2°)
Home colours	Away colours	Third colours

The 2000 Sporting Cristal season were the Forty-Fifth (45.º) of the club from its foundation in 1955, Forty-Five (45) participations consecutives in the top-flight of Peruvian Primera División (of 84 Editions) with denomination Torneo Descentralizado. In Previous Season the club qualified as 3rd Place of the 1999 Torneo Descentralizado.

Sporting Cristal were a of twelve (12) clubs in the Thirty-Fifth edition (35.º) Torneo Descentralizado, the competition most important of the Peruvian football. The club played the Peruvian Primera División, Copa Merconorte for Third (3rd) Time and Copa Libertadores for Twentieth (20th) Time.

== Torneo Descentralizado ==
=== Torneo Apertura ===
Pos	Team	Pld	W	D	L	GF	GA	GD	Pts
7	Alianza Atlético	22	8	6	8	28	27	+1	30
8	Sporting Cristal	22	7	7	8	40	31	+9	28
9	Deportivo Wanka	22	6	6	10	21	32	-11	24

== See also ==
- Club Sporting Cristal
- 2000 Torneo Descentralizado
