= Sport Coopsol Trujillo =

Universidad Privada Antenor Orrego
- Full name: Club Deportivo Universidad Privada Antenor Orrego
- Nickname: UPAO
- Founded: August 30, 1995
- Ground: Estadio Mansiche, Trujillo
- Capacity: 25,000
- League: Copa Perú
Home colours	Away colours

Universidad Privada Antenor Orrego is a Peruvian football club, based in the city of Trujillo, La Libertad. It was founded on August 30, 1995. The club changed its name to Sport Coopsol Trujillo in 2001.

== History ==
=== Deportivo Universidad Privada Antenor Orrego ===
The club was founded on August 30, 1995 and was representing Peruvian university Universidad Privada Antenor Orrego.

The club was the 1999 Copa Perú champion, when they defeated Alfonso Ugarte de Puno in the finals. The club has played at the highest level of Peruvian football on one occasion under its original name, in the 2000 Torneo Descentralizado.

=== Sport Coopsol Trujillo ===
In 2001 the club changed its name to Sport Coopsol Trujillo due to economic reasons. The club was acquired by "Grupo Empresarial Coopsol" and separated its connections with the Antenor Orrego University. Under its new name the club finished the 2001 Torneo Descentralizado season in 9th place out of 12. However, they were relegated in the following 2002 Torneo Descentralizado season as they finished in last place. As a result, the next season Sport Coopsol Trujillo was relegated to a lower division called Copa Perú for the 2003 Copa Perú season. That season the club finished in last place in their group, Region II and therefore were relegated further. This would be the club's last season in any of Peru's top leagues. They then went on to participate in the local leagues of the Trujillo region.

== Honours ==
=== National ===
- Copa Perú: 1

Winners (1): 1999
Runner-up (1): 1997

=== Regional ===
- Región II: 1

Winners (1): 1999

- Liga Distrital de Trujillo: 4

Winners (4): 1997, 1998, 1999, 2011

== See also ==
- List of football clubs in Peru
- Peruvian football league system
