= 1999 Copa Perú =

Copa Perú
- Season: 1999
- Champions: Deportivo UPAO

The 1999 Copa Perú season (Spanish: Copa Perú 1999), the promotion tournament of Peruvian football.

The tournament has 5 stages. The first four stages are played as mini-league round-robin tournaments, except for third stage in region IV, which is played as a knockout stage. The final stage features two knockout rounds and a final four-team group stage to determine the two promoted teams.

This year 26 teams qualified for the Etapa Regional (Regional Stage): 26 champions from each department (including 2 from Lima (the capital) - Peru is politically divided in 24 Departments and 1 Constitutional Province). All these teams are divided into 8 groups by geographical proximity; then each winner qualifies for the Etapa Nacional (National Stage).

Those 8 teams will play, again by geographical proximity, home and away matches, in a knock-out tournament. The winner of the final will be promoted to the First Division

== Departmental Stage ==
The following list shows the teams that qualified for the Regional Stage.

Department	Team	Location
Amazonas	Sachapuyos	Amazonas
Ancash	Sport Ancash	Ancash
Apurímac	Deportivo Educación	Apurímac
Arequipa	Sportivo Huracán	Arequipa
Ayacucho	Deportivo DASA	Ayacucho
Cajamarca	Comerciantes Unidos Scorpión	Cajamarca
Callao	Somos Aduanas	Callao
Cusco	Tintaya Marquiri	Cusco
Huancavelica	Leoncio Prado	Huancavelica
Huánuco	Atlético Arabecks	Huánuco
Ica	Estudiantes de Medicina	Ica
Junín	Deportivo Municipal (El Tambo)	Junín
La Libertad	Deportivo UPAO	La Libertad

Department	Team	Location
Lambayeque	Deportivo Pomalca	Lambayeque
Lima	Juventud Chacarilla	Lima
Lima	Aurora Chancayllo	Lima
Loreto	José Pardo	Iquitos
Madre de Dios	Deportivo Maldonado	Madre de Dios
Moquegua	La Breña	Moquegua
Pasco	Nuevo Berna	Pasco
Piura	UNP	Piura
Puno	Alfonso Ugarte	Puno
San Martín	El Tumi	San Martín
Tacna	Coronel Bolognesi	Tacna
Tumbes	Independiente Aguas Verdes	Tumbes
Ucayali	Atlético Callao	Ucayali

== Regional Stage ==
=== Region I ===
Region I includes qualified teams from Amazonas, Lambayeque, Piura and Tumbes region.

==== Semifinals ====
Team 1	Agg.	Team 2	1st leg	2nd leg
Independiente Aguas Verdes	1–2	UNP	0–0	1–2
Deportivo Pomalca	2–2	Sachapuyos	2–1	0–1

===== Tiebreaker =====
Team 1	Score	Team 2
Deportivo Pomalca	5–2	Sachapuyos

==== Regional Final ====
Team 1	Agg.	Team 2	1st leg	2nd leg
Deportivo Pomalca	6–6	UNP	4–0	2–6

===== Tiebreaker =====
Team 1	Score	Team 2
UNP	0–1	Deportivo Pomalca

=== Region II ===
Region II includes qualified teams from Ancash, Cajamarca and La Libertad region.

Pos	Team	Pld	W	D	L	GF	GA	GD	Pts	Qualification	UPA	ÁNC	COM
1	Deportivo UPAO	4	2	2	0	7	4	+3	8	National stage		0–0	2–0
2	Sport Áncash	4	1	2	1	8	6	+2	5		3–4		4–1
3	Comerciantes Unidos Scorpión	4	0	2	2	3	8	−5	2		1–1	1–1	

Legend: Blue = home team win; Yellow = draw; Red = away team win.

=== Region III ===
Region III includes qualified teams from Loreto, San Martín and Ucayali region.

Pos	Team	Pld	W	D	L	GF	GA	GD	Pts	Qualification	ETT	JPI	CAL
1	El Tumi	4	3	0	1	9	4	+5	9	National stage		4–2	1–0
2	José Pardo	4	2	1	1	6	5	+1	7		2–0		1–1
3	Atlético Callao	4	0	1	3	1	7	−6	1		0–4	0–1	

Legend: Blue = home team win; Yellow = draw; Red = away team win.

=== Region IV ===
Region IV includes qualified teams from Callao, Ica and Lima region.

Pos	Team	Pld	W	D	L	GF	GA	GD	Pts	Qualification	EST	DSA	AUR	JUV
1	Estudiantes de Medicina	6	5	0	1	18	9	+9	15	National stage		2–1	5–3	6–1
2	Somos Aduanas	6	3	0	3	10	11	−1	9		0–2		3–2	3–1
3	Aurora Chancayllo	6	2	0	4	13	13	0	6		3–1	1–2		4–1
4	Juventud Chacarilla	6	2	0	4	8	16	−8	6		1–2	3–1	1–0	

Legend: Blue = home team win; Yellow = draw; Red = away team win.

=== Region V ===
Region V includes qualified teams from Huánuco, Junín and Pasco region.

Pos	Team	Pld	W	D	L	GF	GA	GD	Pts	Qualification	MUN	ARA	NBE
1	Deportivo Municipal (El Tambo)	4	2	2	0	5	1	+4	8	National stage		1–0	3–0
2	Atlético Arabecks	4	2	1	1	8	4	+4	7		0–0		4–1
3	Nueva Berna	4	0	1	3	4	12	−8	1		1–1	2–4	

Legend: Blue = home team win; Yellow = draw; Red = away team win.

=== Region VI ===
Region VI includes qualified teams from Apurímac, Ayacucho and Huancavelica region.

Pos	Team	Pld	W	D	L	GF	GA	GD	Pts	Qualification	DPE	DAS	LPH
1	Deportivo Educación	4	3	0	1	7	2	+5	9	National stage		1–0	3–0
2	Deportivo DASA	4	2	1	1	8	3	+5	7		1–0		5–0
3	Leoncio Prado	4	0	1	3	3	13	−10	1		1–3	2–2	

Legend: Blue = home team win; Yellow = draw; Red = away team win.

=== Region VII ===
Region VII includes qualified teams from Cusco, Madre de Dios and Puno region.

Pos	Team	Pld	W	D	L	GF	GA	GD	Pts	Qualification	ALF	TIN	MLD
1	Alfonso Ugarte	4	3	0	1	10	3	+7	9	National stage		3–0	4–0
2	Tintaya Marquiri	4	2	0	2	5	7	−2	6		2–1		2–1
3	Deportivo Maldonado	4	1	0	3	4	9	−5	3		1–2	2–1	

Legend: Blue = home team win; Yellow = draw; Red = away team win.

=== Region VIII ===
Region VIII includes qualified teams from Arequipa, Moquegua and Tacna region.

Pos	Team	Pld	W	D	L	GF	GA	GD	Pts	Qualification	BOL	DLB	HUR
1	Coronel Bolognesi	4	4	0	0	14	0	+14	12	National stage		6–0	5–0
2	La Breña	4	2	0	2	4	9	−5	6		0–2		2–0
3	Sportivo Huracán	4	0	0	4	1	10	−9	0		0–1	1–2	

Legend: Blue = home team win; Yellow = draw; Red = away team win.

== National Stage ==
The National Stage started on November. The winner of the National Stage was promoted to the 2000 Torneo Descentralizado. On every stage qualification is decided by points, no matter the goal difference. Third match played in neutral ground.

Quarterfinals
Deportivo UPAO	1	4	5
Deportivo Pomalca	1	0	1
El Tumi	0	1	1
Estudiantes de Medicina	1	2	3
Deportivo Municipal (ET)	0	0	0
Deportivo Educación	0	1	1
Coronel Bolognesi	0	3	1 (4)
Alfonso Ugarte	1	0	1 (5)

Semifinals
Deportivo UPAO	1	1	2
Estudiantes de Medicina	1	1	2
Deportivo Educación	2	1	3
Alfonso Ugarte	3	2	5

Finals
Deportivo UPAO	2	0	2
Alfonso Ugarte	0	4	4

=== Quarterfinals ===
Team 1	Agg.	Team 2	1st leg	2nd leg
Deportivo UPAO	5–1	Deportivo Pomalca	1–1	4–0
El Tumi	1–3	Estudiantes de Medicina	0–1	1–2
Deportivo Municipal (El Tambo)	0–1	Deportivo Educación	0–0	0–1
Alfonso Ugarte	1–3	Coronel Bolognesi	1–0	0–3

==== Tiebreaker ====
Team 1	Score	Team 2
Alfonso Ugarte	1–1 (5–4 p)	Coronel Bolognesi

=== Semifinals ===
Team 1	Agg.	Team 2	1st leg	2nd leg
Alfonso Ugarte	5–3	Deportivo Educación	3–2	2–1
Deportivo UPAO	2–2	Estudiantes de Medicina	1–1	1–1

==== Tiebreaker ====
Team 1	Score	Team 2
Deportivo UPAO	2–1	Estudiantes de Medicina

=== Final ===
Team 1	Agg.	Team 2	1st leg	2nd leg
Deportivo UPAO	2–4	Alfonso Ugarte	2–0	0–4

==== Tiebreaker ====
Team 1	Score	Team 2
Deportivo UPAO	3–2	Alfonso Ugarte

== See also ==
- 1999 Torneo Descentralizado
- 1999 Peruvian Segunda División
