= 2017 Ligas Superiores del Perú =

Ligas Superiores del Peru
- Season: 2017
- Champions: San Antonio; Independiente Aguas Verdes

The 2017 Ligas Superiores, the fifth division of Peruvian football (soccer), will be played by variable number teams by Departament.

== Liga Superior de Piura ==
Two groups of three teams played home and away matches. The top two teams in each group moved on to the semifinals.

=== First stage ===
==== Group A ====
| Pos | Team | Pld | W | D | L | GF | GA | GD | Pts | Qualification | SNA | MEL | PFC |
|---|---|---|---|---|---|---|---|---|---|---|---|---|---|
| 1 | San Antonio | 3 | 3 | 0 | 0 | 16 | 4 | +12 | 9 | Advance to Second Stage | — | 2–1 | 9–0 |
| 2 | Melgar de Chulucanas | 4 | 2 | 0 | 2 | 9 | 7 | +2 | 6 | Advance to Second Stage | 3–5 | — | 2–0 |
| 3 | Escuela Piuranitos | 3 | 0 | 0 | 3 | 0 | 14 | −14 | −3 (Note: Piuritanitos FC were deducted 3 point for a walk-over.) | | N.P. | W.O. | — |

Source: Divisíon Superior: Clasificados
Rules for classification: 1) points; 2) goal difference; 3) goals scored; 4) draw.

==== Group B ====
| Pos | Team | Pld | W | D | L | GF | GA | GD | Pts | Qualification | J&V | COM | BOL |
|---|---|---|---|---|---|---|---|---|---|---|---|---|---|
| 1 | Juana & Victor | 4 | 2 | 1 | 1 | 6 | 4 | +2 | 7 | Advance to Second Stage | — | 0–0 | 2–0 |
| 2 | Asociación Comerciantes | 4 | 1 | 2 | 1 | 4 | 5 | −1 | 5 | Advance to Second Stage | 0–2 | — | 2–1 |
| 3 | Defensor Bolognesi | 4 | 1 | 1 | 2 | 7 | 8 | −1 | 4 | | 4–2 | 2–2 | — |

Source: Divisíon Superior: Clasificados
Rules for classification: 1) points; 2) goal difference; 3) goals scored; 4) draw.

=== Second stage ===
Semifinals
Asociación Comerciantes | 0 | — | 0
San Antonio | 3 | w/o | 6
Juana & Victor | 2 | 2 | 4
Melgar de Chulucanas | 1 | 1 | 2

Final
San Antonio
Juana & Victor

San Antonio and Juana & Victor advanced to the Departamental Stage.

== Liga Superior de Tumbes ==
Comercial Aguas Verdes made its debut on the tournament. Cristal Tumbes and Los Chanos were relegated for lack of resources. The team with the fewest points was relegated back to their District League of origin.

| Pos | Team | Pld | W | D | L | GF | GA | GD | Pts | Qualification | IAV | JCC | PNP | CAV | DSJ | SSM | UNT | SPP |
|---|---|---|---|---|---|---|---|---|---|---|---|---|---|---|---|---|---|---|
| 1 | Independiente Aguas Verdes | 7 | 6 | 1 | 0 | 36 | 6 | +30 | 19 | Advance to Departamental Stage | — | 1–1 | 2–1 | 3–1 | 4–0 | – | 10–2 | – |
| 2 | José Chiroque Cielo | 7 | 5 | 1 | 1 | 21 | 6 | +15 | 16 | Advance to Departamental Stage | – | — | – | – | 3–0 | 5–2 | 6–2 | – |
| 3 | 6 de Diciembre | 7 | 4 | 1 | 2 | 23 | 14 | +9 | 13 | | – | 0–3 | — | – | 1–1 | 10–3 | 4–2 | – |
| 4 | Comercial Aguas Verdes | 6 | 4 | 0 | 2 | 25 | 7 | +18 | 12 | | – | – | 1–2 | — | 5–2 | N.P. | – | 7–0 |
| 5 | Defensor San José | 6 | 2 | 1 | 3 | 11 | 14 | −3 | 7 | | – | 1–0 | – | – | — | – | – | W.O. |
| 6 | Sport San Martín | 6 | 2 | 0 | 4 | 12 | 29 | −17 | 6 | | 0–8 | – | – | – | 1–5 | — | 1–0 | 5–1 |
| 7 | UNT | 6 | 1 | 0 | 5 | 9 | 31 | −22 | 3 | | – | – | – | 0–10 | N.P. | – | — | – |
| 8 | Sporting Pizarro | 7 | 0 | 0 | 7 | 4 | 34 | −30 | −6 (Note: Sporting Pizarro were deducted 6 point for 2 walk-overs.) | Relegated to Ligas Distritales del Peru | 1–8 | W.O. | 2–5 | – | – | – | 0–3 | — |

Source: Superior de Tumbes - fecha 7
Rules for classification: 1) points; 2) goal difference; 3) goals scored; 4) draw.
