= Franciscano San Román de Juliaca =

Peruvian football club

Franciscano San Román
- Full name: Club Franciscano San Román
- Founded: 2000
- Ground: Estadio Guillermo Briceño Rosamedina, Juliaca
- League: Copa Perú
- 2013: Eliminated in Regional Stage
Home colours

Franciscano San Román is a Peruvian football club, playing in the city of Juliaca, Peru.

== History ==
Franciscano San Román is one of the clubs with the greatest tradition in the city of Puno, Peru.

In the 2004 Copa Perú, the club qualified to the National Stage, but was eliminated by Senati of Arequipa.

The club was the 2002, 2003, 2004 and 2009 departamental champion and 2009 Liga Superior champion.

In the 2011 Copa Perú, the club qualified to the National Stage, but was eliminated by Sportivo Huracán of Arequipa.

== Honours ==
=== Regional ===
- Región VIII: 1

Winners (1): 2004
Runner-up (1): 2011

- Región VII: 0

Runner-up (1): 2002, 2003

- Liga Departamental de Puno: 5

Winners (5): 2002, 2003, 2004, 2009, 2011

- Liga Superior de Puno: 1

Winners (1): 2009
Runner-up (2): 2008, 2011

== See also ==
- List of football clubs in Peru
- Peruvian football league system
