= Unión Salaverry =

Peruvian football club

- Full name: Club Social Deportivo Unión Salaverry
- Founded: May 25, 1939
- Ground: Estadio Mariano Melgar, Arequipa
- Capacity: 20,000
- Chairman: Evaristo Calderón
- League: Copa Perú
Home colours

Unión Salaverry is a Peruvian football club, playing in the city of Uchumayo, Arequipa, Peru.

== History ==
Unión Salaverry is one of the clubs with the greatest tradition in the city of Uchumayo, Arequipa.

In the 2010, the club participated in the Liga Superior de Arequipa.

== Honours ==
=== Regional ===
- Liga Provincial de Arequipa:

Runner-up (1): 2009

- Liga Distrital de Uchumayo:

Winners (15): 1982, 1983, 1984, 1985, 1987, 1990, 1991, 1992, 1994, 1996, 2000, 2002, 2006, 2014, 2015

== See also ==
- List of football clubs in Peru
- Peruvian football league system
