= 2001 Copa Perú =

Copa Perú
- Season: 2001
- Champions: Sport Bolito

The 2001 Copa Perú season (Spanish: Copa Perú 2001), the promotion tournament of Peruvian football.

The tournament has 5 stages. The first four stages are played as mini-league round-robin tournaments, except for third stage in region IV, which is played as a knockout stage. The final stage features two knockout rounds and a final four-team group stage to determine the two promoted teams.

This year 26 teams qualified for the Etapa Regional (Regional Stage): these are the 26 champions from each department (including 2 from Lima (the capital) – Perú is politically divided in 24 Departments and 1 Constitutional Province).

All these teams are divided into 8 groups by geographical proximity; then each winner qualifies for the Etapa Nacional (National Stage). Those 8 teams will play, again by geographical proximity, home and away matches, in a knock-out tournament. The winner of the final will be promoted to the First Division.

== Departmental stage ==
The following list shows the teams that qualified for the Regional Stage.

Department	Team	Location
Amazonas	Agricobank San Lorenzo	Bagua
Ancash	José Gálvez	Chimbote
Apurímac	Deportivo Educación	Apurímac
Arequipa	Atlético Universidad	Arequipa
Ayacucho	Deportivo Huáscar	Ayacucho
Cajamarca	UTC	Cajamarca
Callao	Somos Aduanas	Callao
Cusco	Deportivo Garcilaso	Cusco
Huancavelica	San Cristóbal	Huancavelica
Huánuco	León de Huánuco	Huánuco
Ica	Aceros Arequipa	Ica
Junín	Deportivo Municipal (El Tambo)	Junín
La Libertad	Universidad César Vallejo	Trujillo

Departament	Team	Location
Lambayeque	Deportivo Pomalca	Lambayeque
Lima	La Esmeralda	Lima
Lima	Atlético Piedra Liza	Lima
Loreto	CNI	Iquitos
Madre de Dios	30 de Agosto	Madre de Dios
Moquegua	Mariscal Nieto	Ilo
Pasco	Unión Mercado	Pasco
Piura	Atlético Grau	Piura
Puno	Alfonso Ugarte	Puno
San Martín	Deportivo Comercio	San Martín
Tacna	Sport Bolito	Tacna
Tumbes	Sporting Pizarro	Tumbes
Ucayali	UNU	Ucayali

== Regional stage ==
=== Region I ===
Region I includes qualified teams from Amazonas, Lambayeque, Piura and Tumbes region.

==== Group A ====
Team 1	Agg.	Team 2	1st leg	2nd leg
Atlético Grau	2–1	Sporting Pizarro	2–0	0–1

===== Tiebreaker =====
Team 1	Score	Team 2
Atlético Grau	1–0	Sporting Pizarro

==== Group B ====
Team 1	Agg.	Team 2	1st leg	2nd leg
Deportivo Pomalca	4–3	Agricobank San Lorenzo	2–1	2–2

==== Regional Final ====
Team 1	Agg.	Team 2	1st leg	2nd leg
Atlético Grau	1–0	Deportivo Pomalca	1–0	0–0

=== Region II ===
Region II includes qualified teams from Ancash, Cajamarca and La Libertad region.

Pos	Team	Pld	W	D	L	GF	GA	GD	Pts	Qualification	GAL	UTC	UCV
1	José Gálvez	4	2	0	2	7	6	+1	6			3–0	2–1
2	UTC	4	2	0	2	4	4	0	6		2–0		2–0
3	Universidad César Vallejo	4	2	0	2	5	6	−1	6	National stage	3–2	1–0	

Legend: Blue = home team win; Yellow = draw; Red = away team win.

==== Tiebreaker ====
Team 1	Score	Team 2
Universidad Cesar Vallejo	2–1	UTC
Universidad Cesar Vallejo	1–1 (4–1 p)	José Gálvez

=== Region III ===
Region III includes qualified teams from Loreto, San Martín and Ucayali region.

Pos	Team	Pld	W	D	L	GF	GA	GD	Pts	Qualification	UNU	COM	CNI
1	UNU	4	3	0	1	5	2	+3	9	National stage		1–0	2–0
2	Deportivo Comercio	4	1	1	2	5	6	−1	4		2–1		1–1
3	CNI	4	1	1	2	4	6	−2	4		0–1	3–2	

Legend: Blue = home team win; Yellow = draw; Red = away team win.

=== Region IV ===
Region IV includes qualified teams from Callao, Ica and Lima region.

Pos	Team	Pld	W	D	L	GF	GA	GD	Pts	Qualification	DSA	AAR	APL	LEC
1	Somos Aduanas	6	4	1	1	12	7	+5	13	National stage		2–1	3–1	2–0
2	Aceros Arequipa	6	3	2	1	13	6	+7	11		2–2		4–0	0–0
3	Atlético Piedra Liza	6	2	0	4	8	15	−7	6		3–2	2–3		1–0
4	La Esmeralda	6	1	1	4	3	8	−5	4		0–1	0–3	3–1	

Legend: Blue = home team win; Yellow = draw; Red = away team win.

=== Region V ===
Region V includes qualified teams from Huánuco, Junín and Pasco region.

Pos	Team	Pld	W	D	L	GF	GA	GD	Pts	Qualification	LEÓ	MJU	UME
1	León de Huánuco	4	3	0	1	7	2	+5	9	National stage		1–0	2–1
2	Deportivo Municipal (El Tambo)	4	2	1	1	4	2	+2	7		1–0		2–0
3	Unión Mercado	4	0	1	3	2	9	−7	1		0–4	1–1	

Legend: Blue = home team win; Yellow = draw; Red = away team win.

=== Region VI ===
Region VI includes qualified teams from Apurímac, Ayacucho and Huancavelica region.

Pos	Team	Pld	W	D	L	GF	GA	GD	Pts	Qualification	DPE	DPH	SCH
1	Deportivo Educación	3	3	0	0	8	2	+6	9	National stage		1–0	4–0
2	Deportivo Huáscar	4	2	0	2	12	8	+4	6		2–3		5–1
3	San Cristóbal	3	0	0	3	4	14	−10	0		W.O.	3–5	

Legend: Blue = home team win; Yellow = draw; Red = away team win.

=== Region VII ===
Region VII includes qualified teams from Cusco, Madre de Dios and Puno region.

Pos	Team	Pld	W	D	L	GF	GA	GD	Pts	Qualification	ALF	DPG	30A
1	Alfonso Ugarte	4	3	1	0	5	0	+5	10	National stage		1–0	3–0
2	Deportivo Garcilaso	3	1	0	2	4	2	+2	3		0–1		4–0
3	30 de Agosto	3	0	1	2	0	7	−7	1		0–0	W.O.	

Legend: Blue = home team win; Yellow = draw; Red = away team win.

=== Region VIII ===
Region VIII includes qualified teams from Arequipa, Moquegua and Tacna region.

Pos	Team	Pld	W	D	L	GF	GA	GD	Pts	Qualification	BOL	AUN	MNI
1	Sport Bolito	4	3	0	1	10	4	+6	9	National stage		2–0	5–1
2	Atlético Universidad	4	3	0	1	9	3	+6	9		1–0		6–0
3	Mariscal Nieto	4	0	0	4	4	16	−12	0		2–3	1–2	

Legend: Blue = home team win; Yellow = draw; Red = away team win.

==== Tiebreaker ====
Team 1	Score	Team 2
Sport Bolito	1–1 (3–2 p)	Atlético Universidad

== National stage ==
The National Stage started on November. The winner of the National Stage was promoted to the 2002 Torneo Descentralizado. On every stage qualification is decided by points, no matter the goal difference. Third match played in neutral ground.

Quarter-finals
Atlético Grau	1	0	1
Universidad César Vallejo	1	1	2
Somos Aduanas	0	1	1
UNU	2	2	4
Deportivo Educación	1	2	3
León de Huánuco	3	1	4
Alfonso Ugarte	2	0	2
Sport Bolito	1	2	3

Semi-finals
Universidad César Vallejo	5	1	6
UNU	2	1	3
León de Huánuco	0	0	0
Sport Bolito	4	4	8

Finals
Universidad César Vallejo	2	0	2
Sport Bolito	1	2	3

=== Quarter-finals ===
Team 1	Agg.	Team 2	1st leg	2nd leg
Atlético Grau	1–2	Universidad César Vallejo	1–1	0–1
UNU	4–1	Somos Aduanas	2–0	2–1
León de Huánuco	4–3	Deportivo Educación	3–1	1–2
Alfonso Ugarte	2–3	Sport Bolito	2–1	0–2

==== Tiebreaker ====
Team 1	Score	Team 2
León de Huánuco	1–0	Deportivo Educación
Alfonso Ugarte	2–3	Sport Bolito

=== Semi-finals ===
Team 1	Agg.	Team 2	1st leg	2nd leg
Universidad César Vallejo	6–3	UNU	5–2	1–1
Sport Bolito	8–0	León de Huánuco	4–0	4–0

=== Final ===
Team 1	Agg.	Team 2	1st leg	2nd leg
Universidad César Vallejo	2–3	Sport Bolito	2–1	0–2

==== Tiebreaker ====
Team 1	Score	Team 2
Sport Bolito	3–3 (3–1 p)	Universidad César Vallejo

== See also ==
- 2001 Torneo Descentralizado
- 2001 Peruvian Segunda División
