= Comerciantes Unidos =

Peruvian football club

- Full name: Asociación Social Deportiva y Cultural Comerciantes Unidos
- Nicknames: Las Águilas Cutervinas; La Fiorentina de Cutervo
- Founded: 19 September 2002; 24 years ago
- Ground: Estadio Juan Maldonado Gamarra
- Capacity: 12,000
- Chairman: Aníbal Pedraza Aguilar
- Manager: Claudio Biaggio
- League: Liga 1
- 2025: Liga 1, 13th of 19
- Website: http://www.clubcomerciantesunidos.com/
Home colours	Away colours	Third colours

Club Deportivo Comerciantes Unidos, shortened to Comerciantes Unidos, is a Peruvian professional football club from Cutervo, Cajamarca. It was founded in 2002 and currently plays in the Peruvian Primera División, after gaining promotion for the second time in 2023.

== History ==
Comerciantes Unidos was founded as Los Comerciantes by Abdias Cieza Tapia, Juan Tarrillo Castro, and Jorge Salas Toro in 2001. That year they were promoted to their local district league. In 2002, they became an official club and changed their name to Club Social Deportivo y Cultural Comerciantes Unidos. In 2008, they reached the Copa Perú National Stage for the first time. In 2010, they were invited to participate in La Liga Superior de Cajamarca which groups the best teams from the Cajamarca Region and gives direct access to the Department Stage of the Copa Perú. that same year they reached the National Stage of the Copa Peru once more. In 2013, they once more reached the Copa Perú National Stage and were invited to participate in the Peruvian Segunda División.

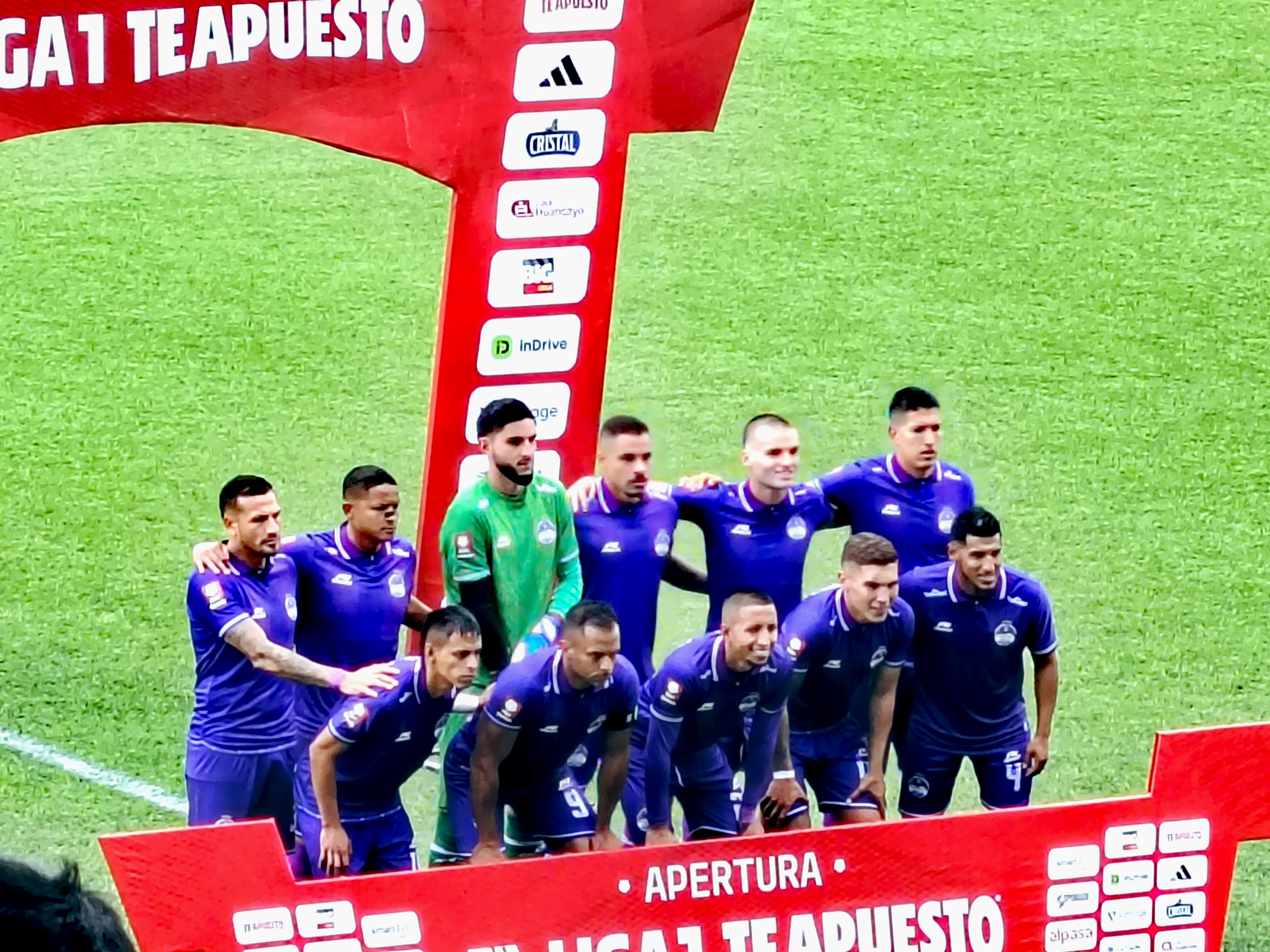
Comerciantes Unidos starting eleven in 2026

Comerciantes Unidos played its first season in the Peruvian Segunda División in the neighboring province of Santa Cruz due to their home stadium being remodeled. This was very difficult for the team and their fans. The team finished the season 14th, only 5 points away from relegation. During the 2015 season, Carlos Cortijo, who had won the Segunda División tournament the year before, was hired as the new manager by club president Aníbal Pedraza Aguilar. Comerciantes Unidos was able to once again play its home matches at their local stadium, Estadio Juan Maldonado Gamarra. The club won the tournament on 25 October 2015 after defeating Sport Boys 1–0 at a home match. Comerciantes Unidos had a great debut campaign in the 2016 Torneo Descentralizado where it finished 6th and qualified for the first time to an international tournament, the 2017 Copa Sudamericana.

Comerciantes Unidos returned to the First Division in 2023, after winning the 2023 Liga 2, their second, Second Division title.

== Colours and badge ==
Comerciantes Unidos' colours are blue and yellow which can be seen on the club's home and away kits respectively.

The current badge was designed by club fan José Requejo Díaz in 2010. The three stars represent the three times that Comerciantes reached the National Stage of the Copa Perú.

2010–2022

2022–Present

== Stadium ==
Comerciantes Unidos plays their home matches at Estadio Juan Maldonado Gamarra. Located in Cutervo, it has a capacity of 12,000 spectators. It was expanded from 8,000 spectators in 2014.

== Current squad ==
As of 30 August 2025

Note: Flags indicate national team as defined under FIFA eligibility rules; some limited exceptions apply. Players may hold more than one non-FIFA nationality.

No.	Pos.	Nation	Player
1	GK	PER	Fabrián Caytuiro
6	MF	PER	Keyvin Paico
9	FW	ARG	Matías Sen (captain)
11	FW	PER	Alexander Lecaros
12	MF	PER	Luis García
15	MF	PER	Mathías Carpio
16	DF	ARG	Nahuel Tecilla
17	DF	CHI	Pablo Cárdenas
20	MF	PER	José Parodi
22	MF	ARG	Julián Marchioni
23	GK	URU	Álvaro Villete
25	DF	PER	Williams Guzmán
26	DF	PER	Paolo Méndez

No.	Pos.	Nation	Player
28	GK	PER	Luis García
29	FW	PER	Carlos Saavedra
30	MF	PER	José Marina
31	DF	PER	Rotceh Aguilar
34	MF	PER	Ricardo Chipao
35	DF	PER	Gilmar Paredes (on loan from Sporting Cristal)
36	DF	PER	Gabriel Alfaro (on loan from Sporting Cristal)
37	DF	PER	Yordi Vílchez
40	DF	PER	Flavio Alcedo (on loan from Sporting Cristal)
76	FW	PER	Nicolás Figueroa (on loan from Melgar)
85	FW	PER	Gonzalo Sánchez
99	FW	PER	Jhosep Núñez
—	GK	PER	José Charún

=== Staff ===
Coaching staff
Head coach	Martín Cardetti
Assistant coach	Renato Clavo
Goalkeeper coach	Omar Ríos

== Honours ==
=== Senior titles ===
Keys

- Record
- ^{(s)} Shared record

Type	Competition	Titles	Runner-up	Winning years	Runner-up years
National (League)	Liga 2	2	—	2015, 2023	—
Regional (League)	Región II	2	1	2008, 2013	2010
Regional (League)	Liga Departamental de Cajamarca	2	1	2008, 2010	2013
Regional (League)	Liga Superior de Cajamarca	1	—	2010	—
Regional (League)	Liga Provincial de Cutervo	2	—	2008, 2013	—
Regional (League)	Liga Distrital de Cutervo	2	—	2008, 2013	—
