= 2000 Copa Perú =

Copa Perú
- Season: 2000
- Champions: Estudiantes de Medicina

The 2000 Copa Perú season (Spanish: Copa Perú 2000), the promotion tournament of Peruvian football.

The tournament has 5 stages. The first four stages are played as mini-league round-robin tournaments, except for third stage in region IV, which is played as a knockout stage. The final stage features two knockout rounds and a final four-team group stage to determine the two promoted teams.

This year 27 teams qualified for the Etapa Regional (Regional Stage): 1 team relegated last year from First Division and 26 champions from each department (including 2 from Lima (the capital) - Peru is politically divided in 24 Departments and 1 Constitutional Province).

All these teams are divided into 8 groups by geographical proximity; then each winner qualifies for the Etapa Nacional (National Stage).

Those 8 teams will play, again by geographical proximity, home and away matches, in a knock-out tournament. The winner of the final will be promoted to the First Division.

== Departmental Stage ==
The following list shows the teams that qualified for the Regional Stage.

Department	Team	Location
Amazonas	Sachapuyos	Amazonas
Ancash	Sport Áncash	Ancash
Apurímac	Kola Real	Apurímac
Arequipa	Atlético Universidad	Arequipa
Ayacucho	Percy Berrocal	Ayacucho
Cajamarca	Lira Jesuense	Cajamarca
Callao	Atlético Chalaco	Callao
Cusco	Deportivo Garcilaso	Cusco
Huancavelica	Deportivo Municipal (Acobamba)	Acobamba
Huánuco	León de Huánuco	Huánuco
Ica	Estudiantes de Medicina	Ica
Junín	Cultural Hidro	Junín
La Libertad	Carlos A. Mannucci	Trujillo

Department	Team	Location
Lambayeque	Deportivo Pomalca	Lambayeque
Lima	Juventud Chacarilla	Lima
Lima	Aurora Chancayllo	Lima
Loreto	UNAP	Iquitos
Madre de Dios	Hospital Santa Rosa	Madre de Dios
Moquegua	La Breña	Moquegua
Pasco	UNDAC	Pasco
Piura	Atlético Grau	Piura
Piura	I.M.I.	Piura
Puno	Alfonso Ugarte	Puno
San Martín	Power Maíz	San Martín
Tacna	Coronel Bolognesi	Tacna
Tumbes	Sport Pampas	Tumbes
Ucayali	San Juan	Ucayali

== Regional Stage ==
=== Region I ===
Region I includes qualified teams from Amazonas, Lambayeque, Piura and Tumbes region.

==== Group A ====
Pos	Team	Pld	W	D	L	GF	GA	GD	Pts	Qualification	GRA	SPP	IMI
1	Atlético Grau	4	2	1	1	8	6	+2	7	National stage		4–2	3–2
2	Sport Pampas	4	1	2	1	5	6	−1	5		1–1		0–0
3	I.M.I.	4	1	1	2	4	5	−1	4		1–0	1–2	

==== Group B ====
Team 1	Agg.	Team 2	1st leg	2nd leg
Deportivo Pomalca	5–3	Sachapuyos	2–2	3–1

==== Regional Final ====
Team 1	Agg.	Team 2	1st leg	2nd leg
Atlético Grau	2–2 (5–4 p)	Deportivo Pomalca	1–2	1–0

=== Region II ===
Region II includes qualified teams from Ancash, Cajamarca and La Libertad region.

Pos	Team	Pld	W	D	L	GF	GA	GD	Pts		CSÁ	LJE	CAM
1	Sport Áncash	4	3	0	1	6	3	+3	6 (Note: Sport Áncash were docked 3 points.)	National stage		2–0	1–0
2	Lira Jesuense	4	2	0	2	8	6	+2	6		0–1		6–2
3	Carlos A. Mannucci	4	1	0	3	6	11	−5	3		3–2	1–2	

==== Tiebreaker ====
Team 1	Score	Team 2
Sport Áncash	2–1	Lira Jesuense

=== Region III ===
Region III includes qualified teams from Loreto, San Martín and Ucayali region.

Pos	Team	Pld	W	D	L	GF	GA	GD	Pts	Qualification	SJP	EMP	UNA
1	San Juan	4	3	1	0	12	4	+8	10	National stage		5–1	4–1
2	Power Maíz	4	1	2	1	6	8	−2	5		2–2		2–0
3	UNAP	4	0	1	3	2	8	−6	1		0–1	1–1	

=== Region IV ===
Region IV includes qualified teams from Callao, Ica and Lima region.

Pos	Team	Pld	W	D	L	GF	GA	GD	Pts	Qualification	EST	AUR	JVC	CHA
1	Estudiantes de Medicina	6	3	3	0	9	4	+5	12	National stage		3–0	0–0	1–0
2	Aurora Chancayllo	6	3	2	1	11	8	+3	11		0–0		6–2	1–0
3	Juventud Chacarilla	6	1	2	3	10	15	−5	5		4–4	2–3		2–1
4	Atlético Chalaco	6	1	1	4	3	6	−3	4		0–1	1–1	1–0	

=== Region V ===
Region V includes qualified teams from Huánuco, Junín and Pasco region.

Pos	Team	Pld	W	D	L	GF	GA	GD	Pts	Qualification	LEÓ	CHI	UND
1	León de Huánuco	4	3	0	1	10	6	+4	9	National stage		1–0	6–2
2	Cultural Hidro	4	2	1	1	4	1	+3	7		2–0		2–0
3	UNDAC	4	0	1	3	4	11	−7	1		2–3	0–0	

=== Region VI ===
Region VI includes qualified teams from Apurímac, Ayacucho and Huancavelica region.

Pos	Team	Pld	W	D	L	GF	GA	GD	Pts	Qualification	KRA	PBE	MAC
1	Kola Real	4	3	1	0	11	3	+8	10	National stage		4–1	3–1
2	Percy Berrocal	4	0	3	1	3	6	−3	3		1–1		1–1
3	Deportivo Municipal (Acobamba)	4	0	2	2	2	7	−5	2		0–3	0–0	

=== Region VII ===
Region VII includes qualified teams from Cusco, Madre de Dios and Puno region.

Pos	Team	Pld	W	D	L	GF	GA	GD	Pts	Qualification	DPG	ALF	HSR
1	Deportivo Garcilaso	4	3	0	1	13	2	+11	9	National stage		0–2	8–0
2	Alfonso Ugarte	4	3	0	1	12	1	+11	9		0–1		6–0
3	Hospital Santa Rosa	4	0	0	4	0	22	−22	0		0–4	0–4	

=== Region VIII ===
Region VIII includes qualified teams from Arequipa, Moquegua and Tacna region.

Pos	Team	Pld	W	D	L	GF	GA	GD	Pts	Qualification	BOL	AUN	DLB
1	Coronel Bolognesi	4	3	1	0	10	3	+7	10	National stage		2–2	3–1
2	Atlético Universidad	3	0	2	1	2	3	−1	2		0–1		W.O.
3	La Breña	3	0	1	2	1	7	−6	1		0–4	0–0	

== National Stage ==
The National Stage started on November. The winner of the National Stage will be promoted to the 2001 Torneo Descentralizado. On every stage qualification is decided by points, no matter the goal difference. Third match played in neutral ground.

Quarterfinals
Atlético Grau	1	0	1
Sport Áncash	0	3	3
San Juan	2	0	2
Estudiantes de Medicina	2	3	5
Kola Real	3	0	3
León de Huánuco	1	1	2
Deportivo Garcilaso	2	0	2
Coronel Bolognesi	1	1	2

Semifinals
Atlético Grau	2	0	2
Estudiantes de Medicina	3	1	4
León de Huánuco	0	0	0
Coronel Bolognesi	5	9	14

Finals
Estudiantes de Medicina	1	1	2
Coronel Bolognesi	0	0	0

=== Quarterfinals ===
Team 1	Agg.	Team 2	1st leg	2nd leg
Atlético Grau	1–3	Sport Áncash	1–0	0–3
San Juan	2–5	Estudiantes de Medicina	2–2	0–3
Kola Real	3–2	León de Huánuco	3–1	0–1
Deportivo Garcilaso	2–2	Coronel Bolognesi	2–1	0–1

==== Tiebreaker ====
Team 1	Score	Team 2
Atlético Grau	3–1	Sport Áncash
Kola Real	1–2	León de Huánuco
Deportivo Garcilaso	1–2	Coronel Bolognesi

=== Semifinals ===
Team 1	Agg.	Team 2	1st leg	2nd leg
Atlético Grau	2–4	Estudiantes de Medicina	2–3	0–1
León de Huánuco	0–14	Coronel Bolognesi	0–5	0–9

=== Final ===
Team 1	Agg.	Team 2	1st leg	2nd leg
Estudiantes de Medicina	2–0	Coronel Bolognesi	1–0	1–0

== See also ==
- 2002 Torneo Descentralizado
- 2002 Peruvian Segunda División
