= Cultural Volante =

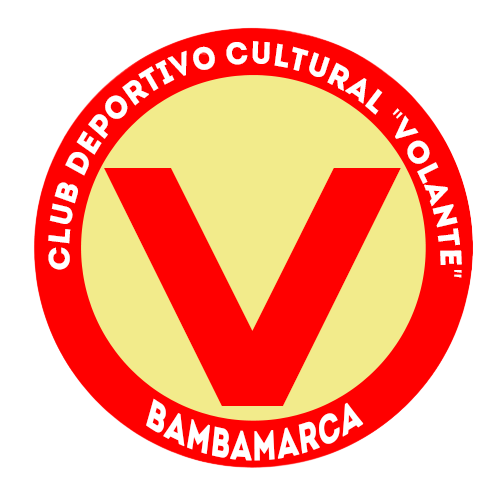
- Full name: Club Deportivo Cultural Volante
- Founded: June 7, 1973
- Ground: Estadio El Frutillo, Bambamarca, Peru
- League: Copa Perú
Home colours

Club Deportivo Cultural Volante (sometimes referred as Cultural Volante) is a Peruvian football club, playing in the city of Bambamarca, Cajamarca, Peru.

== History ==
The Club Deportivo Cultural Volante was founded on June 7, 1973.

The club was 2010 and 2011 Liga Superior de Cajamarca runner-up.

In the 2010 Copa Perú, the club qualified to the Regional Stage, but was eliminated by Unión Comercio in the Group Stage.

In the 2011 Copa Perú, the club qualified to the Regional Stage, but was eliminated by Universitario de Trujillo in the Group Stage.

In the 2018 Copa Perú, the club qualified to the Departamental Stage, but was eliminated by ADA in the semifinals.

In the 2019 Copa Perú, the club qualified to the National Stage, but was eliminated by Juventud Municipal in the Round of 32.

== Honours ==
=== Senior titles ===
Keys

- Record
- ^{(s)} Shared record

Type	Competition	Titles	Runner-up	Winning years	Runner-up years
Regional (League)	Región I	1	—	1990	—
Regional (League)	Liga Departamental de Cajamarca	2	4	1989, 2022	2010, 2011, 2019, 2024
Regional (League)	Liga Superior de Cajamarca	—	2	—	2010, 2011
Regional (League)	Liga Provincial de Cajamarca	8	—	1989, 1994, 2014, 2018, 2019, 2022, 2023, 2024	—
Regional (League)	Liga Distrital de Cajamarca	6	2	1989, 1994, 2014, 2018, 2023, 2024	2019, 2022

== See also ==
- List of football clubs in Peru
- Peruvian football league system
