= FBC Aurora =

- Full name: Foot Ball Club Aurora
- Nickname(s): Fuerza Tigre, Los Tigres de Antiquilla
- Founded: December 25, 1916
- Ground: Estadio Mariano Melgar, Arequipa
- Capacity: 20,000
- Chairman: Mauricio Marquina
- Manager: Oscar Chavez
- League: Copa Perú
- 2013: Eliminated in District Stage
Home colours

Foot Ball Club Aurora is a Peruvian football club, playing in the city of Arequipa, Peru. The club was founded in 1916 and plays in the Copa Perú, which is the third division of the Peruvian league.

== History ==
The club was founded on 25 December 1916. It has played at the highest level of Peruvian football on three occasions, from 1988 Torneo Descentralizado until 1991 Torneo Descentralizado, when it was relegated. In the 2010 Copa Perú, the club qualified to the National Stage, but was eliminated by Alianza Porvenir-Unicachi of Puno in the Round of 16.

== Rivalries ==
FBC Aurora has had a long-standing rivalry with FBC Melgar, Sportivo Huracán, FBC Piérola, and FBC White Star.

== Honours ==
=== National ===
- Copa Perú: 0

Runner-up (2): 1993, 1994

=== Regional ===
- Región VII:

Runner-up (1): 2010

- Liga Departamental de Arequipa:

Winners (2): 1987, 2010
Runner-up (2): 2012, 2023

- Liga Provincial de Arequipa:

Winners (17): 1919-I, 1921-I, 1925-III, 1929-III, 1930, 1931-I,1931-II, 1933, 1934-II,1936, 1937-I, 1937-II, 1938-I, 1938-II 1987, 2007, 2024
Runner-up (1): 2023

- Liga Superior de Arequipa:

Runner-up (1): 2010

- Liga Distrital de Arequipa:

Winners (17): 1919-I, 1921-I, 1925-III, 1929-III, 1930, 1931-I,1931-II, 1933, 1934-II, 1936, 1937, 1945, 1951, 1987, 2007, 2016, 2022, 2023
Runner-up (7): 1945, 1964, 1986, 2008, 2015, 2017, 2025

== See also ==
- List of football clubs in Peru
- Peruvian football league system
