= Unión Minas =

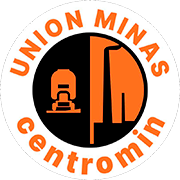
- Full name: Club Deportivo Unión Minas Centromin Pasco
- Nickname: "El Club de la mina" (Mine Club)
- Founded: April 23, 1974
- Ground: Estadio Daniel Alcides Carrión
- Capacity: 12,000
- Chairman: Jesús Rivera Ramírez
- Manager: Jesús Álvarez
- League: Liga 2
- 2025 Copa Perú: 1st (Promoted)
Home colours	Away colours

Club Deportivo Unión Minas Centromin, commonly known as Unión Minas, is a Peruvian football club, based in the city of Cerro de Pasco. The club was founded in 1974 and plays in the Peruvian Segunda División after winning the Copa Perú for the first time in 2025.

== History ==
The Club Deportivo Unión Minas was founded on 23 April, 1974 by the initiative of a group of miners and with the financing of Centromin Perú, a state owned company, with its first president being the engineer Heraclio Ríos Quinteros.

The club has played at the highest level of Peruvian football on sixteen occasions, from 1986 Torneo Descentralizado until 2001 Torneo Descentralizado when it was relegated to 2002 Copa Perú. In the Torneo Descentralizado, the club had a huge home advantage for its high altitude stadium.

After its relegation, the club nearly disappeared, to the point that the Peruvian tax authority, SUNAT offered it for auction after it had been seized for tax debt. In 2007, it returned to competitive play after receiving financial support from the mining company Volcan, officially becoming known as Unión Minas Volcan. It participated in the Liga Superior de Pasco, winning the championship in the latter year and reaching the Regional Stage of the 2010 Copa Perú. In 2011, it began its participation in the Departmental Stage, being eliminated at that stage, and from the following year onward, it ceased participating in official tournaments until 2025.

In 2025, Unión Minas qualified for the 2025 Copa Perú national stage. It reached the semi-finals, guaranteeing promotion to the Liga 3. They faced ASA in the semi-finals, drawing 1–1. However, Unión Minas was awarded the win via walkover. They won the Copa Perú for the first time after defeating ANBA Perú in the final.

== Stadium ==
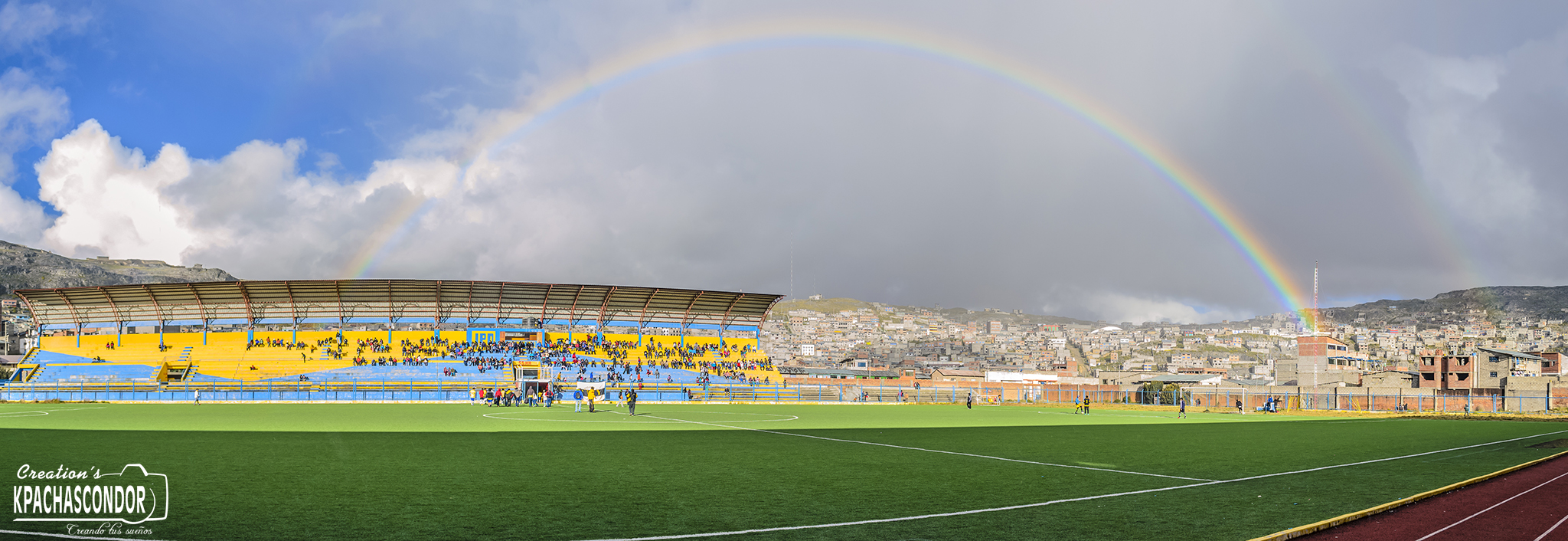
Estadio Daniel Alcides Carrión

Unión Minas plays their home games at Estadio Daniel Alcides Carrión located in Cerro de Pasco. According to FIFA, it is the highest stadium in the world, located at an altitude of 4,378 meters above sea level. The stadium has a capacity of 12,000. The stadium uses artificial turf, as natural grass has difficulty growing at its high altitude.

== Honours ==
=== Senior titles ===
Keys

- Record
- ^{(s)} Shared record

Type	Competition	Titles	Runner-up	Winning years	Runner-up years
National (League)	Copa Perú	1	—	2025	—
Half-year / Short tournament (League)	Torneo Zona Centro	—	3	—	1987, 1990–II, 1991–II
Regional (League)	Liga Departamentales de Pasco	4	2	1977, 1978, 1984, 2025	2008, 2010
Regional (League)	Liga Superior de Pasco	1	1	2010	2009
Regional (League)	Liga Provincial de Cerro de Pasco	4	—	1978, 1980, 1982, 1984	—
Regional (League)	Liga Distrital de Chaupimarca	2	—	1976, 1981	—
Regional (League)	Liga Distrital de Atacocha-La Quinua	1	—	2022	—
Regional (League)	Liga Distrital de Simón Bolívar - Rancas	1	—	2025	—

== See also ==
- List of football clubs in Peru
- Peruvian football league system
