= Ligas Superiores del Peru =

- Founded: 2004
- Folded: 2023; 3 years ago
- Country: Peru
- Number of clubs: Variable
- Level on pyramid: 5
- Promotion to: Ligas Departamentales
- Relegation to: Ligas Distritales

The Ligas Superiores was one of two leagues that formed part of the Departamental Stage in the Copa Perú of the Peruvian Football Federation (FPF) football league system. The other league at level was the Ligas Departamentales.

A transcendental step was given in the Copa Perú with the official establishment of the Ligas Superiores which did not become as successful as expected.

== Format ==
The Ligas Superiores were composed of a select group of clubs of each department. The champion and runner-up from each league automatically qualifies to their department's Liga Departamental.

== History ==
The Ligas Superiores were officially created in 2009. In 2009, nine the Departmental Federations determined to adopt them: Arequipa, Ayacucho, Cajamarca, Huánuco, Lambayeque, Pasco, Piura, Puno and Tumbes.

As of 2019, only two departments continue to have a Liga Superior, Piura and Tumbes.

== Liga Superior de Áncash ==
=== List of champions ===
Ed.	Season	Champion	Runner-up
1	2011	UNASAM	Universidad San Pedro
Defunct Tournament

== Liga Superior de Arequipa ==
=== List of champions ===
Ed.	Season	Champion	Runner-up
1	2009	Unión Minas de Orcopampa	Juventus Corazón
2	2010	Sportivo Huracán	Aurora
Defunct Tournament

== Liga Superior de Ayacucho ==
=== List of champions ===
Ed.	Season	Champion	Runner-up
1	2008	Pichari VRAE	Juventud Gloria
2	2009	Deportivo Municipal (H)	Froebel Deportes
Defunct Tournament

== Liga Superior de Cajamarca ==
=== List of champions ===
Ed.	Season	Champion	Runner-up
1	2009	Deportivo Municipal (Chota)	Deportivo Municipal (Santa Cruz)
2	2010	Comerciantes Unidos	Cultural Volante
3	2011	UTC	Cultural Volante
Defunct Tournament

== Liga Superior del Callao ==
=== List of champions ===
Ed.	Season	Champion	Runner-up
1	2010	Atlético Pilsen Callao	José López Pazos
2	2011	Atlético Pilsen Callao	ADEBAMI
3	2012	Juventud La Perla	José Gálvez
4	2013	Márquez	Juventud La Perla
5	2014	ADEBAMI	Juventud La Perla
6	2015	Juventud La Perla	Somos Aduanas
Defunct Tournament

== Liga Superior de Cusco ==
=== List of champions ===
Ed.	Season	Champion	Runner-up
1	2010	Deportivo Municipal (La Convención)	Humberto Luna
Defunct Tournament

== Liga Superior de Huánuco ==
=== List of champions ===
Ed.	Season	Champion	Runner-up
1	2008	Alianza Universidad	León de Huánuco
2	2009	Alianza Universidad	León de Huánuco
3	2010	Bella Durmiente	Alianza Universidad
Defunct Tournament

== Liga Superior de Lambayeque ==
=== List of champions ===
Ed.	Season	Champion	Runner-up
1	2004	Universidad de Chiclayo	Cachorro
2	2005	Juan Aurich	
3	2006		
4	2007	Cruzada Deportiva	Deportivo Pomalca
5	2008	Universidad Señor de Sipán	Deportivo Pomalca
6	2009	Deportivo Pomalca	Universidad de Chiclayo
7	2010	Deportivo Pomalca	Universidad Señor de Sipán
8	2011	Los Caimanes	Universitarios (Illimo)
9	2012	Universidad Señor de Sipán	Flamengo
10	2013	Universidad Señor de Sipán	Willy Serrato
11	2014	La Nueva Alianza	Cruz de Chalpón
12	2015	La Nueva Alianza	Universidad Señor de Sipán
13	2016	Juan Aurich (Chongoyape)	La Nueva Alianza
Defunct Tournament

== Liga Superior de Pasco ==
=== List of champions ===
Ed.	Season	Champion	Runner-up
1	2009	Deportivo Municipal (Yanahuanca)	Unión Minas
2	2010	Unión Minas	Sport Ticlacayán
Defunct Tournament

== Liga Superior de Piura ==
=== List of champions ===
Ed.	Season	Champion	Runner-up
1	2009	Atlético Grau	Cultural Locuto
2	2010	Atlético Grau	Cultural Locuto
3	2011	Oleoducto Petroperú	Estrella Roja
4	2012	Juana & Victor	Carlos Concha (Talara)
5	2013	Atlético Grau	José Olaya (Paita)
6	2014	Atlético Grau	Jorge Chávez (Sullana)
7	2015	Defensor La Bocana	Escuela Piuranitos
8	2016	Atlético Grau	San Antonio
9	2017	San Antonio	Juana & Víctor
10	2018	San Miguel	Juventud Cautivo
11	2019	Juventud Cautivo	Sport Estrella
–	2020	Canceled due to the COVID-19 pandemic	
–	2021	Canceled due to the COVID-19 pandemic	
–	2022	No tournament	
12	2023	Academia Cristo Rey	Semillero Tambogrande
Defunct Tournament

== Liga Superior de Puno ==
=== List of champions ===
Ed.	Season	Champion	Runner-up
1	2008	Diablos Rojos	Franciscano San Román
2	2009	Franciscano San Román	Unión Carolina
3	2010	Unión Fuerza Minera	Alianza Unicachi
4	2011	Defensor Politécnico	Franciscano San Román
5	2012	Alfonso Ugarte	Binacional
Defunct Tournament

== Liga Superior de Tumbes ==
=== List of champions ===
Ed.	Season	Champion	Runner-up
1	2009	Sport Pampas	Sporting Pizarro
2	2010	Sporting Pizarro	Deportivo Pacífico
3	2011	Sport Buenos Aires	UNT
4	2012	Sporting Pizarro	Sport Pampas
5	2013	Sport San Martín	José Chiroque Cielo
6	2014	José Chiroque Cielo	Sporting Pizarro
7	2015	Cristal Tumbes	José Chiroque Cielo
8	2016	Independiente Aguas Verdes	6 de Diciembre
9	2017	Independiente Aguas Verdes	José Chiroque Cielo
10	2018	José Chiroque Cielo	UNT
11	2019	UNT	Ferrocarril
Defunct Tournament

== See also ==
- List of football clubs in Peru
- Peruvian football league system
