= Deportivo Pomalca =

Peruvian football club

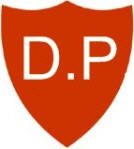
- Full name: Deportivo Pomalca
- Nickname(s): La Fuerza Azucarera, Los azucareros
- Founded: January 9, 1949
- Ground: Estadio Elías Aguirre, Chiclayo
- Capacity: 25,000
- League: Copa Perú
- 2013: Liga Superior de Lambayeque, 7th
Home colours	Away colours

Deportivo Pomalca is a Peruvian football club, playing in the city of Chiclayo, Lambayeque, Peru.

== Rivalries ==
Deportivo Pomalca has had a long-standing rivalry with José Pardo.

== Honours ==
=== Regional ===
- Región I:

Winners (1): 1999
Runner-up (3): 1998, 2000, 2001

- Liga Departamental de Lambayeque:

Winners (6): 1998, 1999, 2000, 2001, 2008, 2012
Runner-up (2): 2010, 2011

- Liga Superior de Lambayeque:

Winners (2): 2009, 2010
Runner-up (1): 2007

- Liga Distrital de Chiclayo:

Winners (7): 1982, 1984, 1995, 1998, 1999, 2001, 2002

== See also ==
- List of football clubs in Peru
- Peruvian football league system
