= Atlético Pilsen Callao =

Pilsen Callao
- Full name: Club Atlético Pilsen Callao
- Nickname(s): Cerveceros
- Founded: April 28, 1976; 48 years ago
- Ground: Estadio Facundo Ramírez Aguilar, Jaén
- Capacity: 2,000
- Chairman: Eric Mendoza León
- League: Copa Perú
Home colours

Club Atlético Pilsen Callao (sometimes referred as Pilsen Callao) is a Peruvian football club, playing in the city of Dulanto, Callao, Peru.

== History ==
The Club Atlético Pilsen Callao was founded on April 28, 1976.

In 2007 Copa Perú, the club qualified to the Regional Stage, but was eliminated by Óscar Benavides in the First Stage.

In 2008 Copa Perú, the club qualified to the Regional Stage, but was eliminated by Unión Supe in the First Stage.

In 2009 Copa Perú, the club qualified to the Regional Stage, but was eliminated by La Rural in the semifinals.

In 2010 Copa Perú, the club qualified to the Regional Stage, but was eliminated when it finished in 6th place.

In 2017 Copa Perú, the club qualified to the Departamental Stage, but was eliminated in the group stage.

== Honours ==
=== Regional ===
- Liga Departamental de Callao:

Winners (1): 2009
Runner-up (3): 2007, 2008, 2010

- Liga Superior de Callao:

Winners (2): 2010, 2011

- Liga Intradistrital de Dulanto:

Winners (5): 2007, 2008, 2009, 2017, 2023
Runner-up (1): 2006

== See also ==
- List of football clubs in Peru
- Peruvian football league system
