= Sporting Pizarro =

Peruvian football club

- Full name: Club Sporting Pizarro
- Nickname(s): Cremas
- Founded: April 16, 1954
- Ground: Estadio Mariscal Cáceres, Tumbes
- Capacity: 12,000
- Manager: Rigoberto Zapata
- League: Copa Perú
- 2017: Liga Superior, 8th (relegated)
Home colours

Sporting Pizarro is a Peruvian football club, playing in the city of Tumbes, Peru.

== History ==
Sporting Pizarro is a traditional team of Tumbes. In the 2001 Copa Perú and 2003 Copa Perú, the team was eliminated by Atlético Grau of Piura in the Regional Stage. In the 2005 Copa Perú, Sporting Pizarro was eliminated by Boca Juniors of Ferreñafe in the Regional Stage.

In the 2007 Copa Perú, the club qualified to the National Stage but was eliminated by Sport Vallejo of Trujillo in the quarterfinals.

Sporting Pizarro won the 2010 Liga Superior de Tumbes, when defeated Deportivo Pacífico of Zarumilla.

In the 2011 Torneo Intermedio, the club was eliminated by Sport Huancayo in the Round of 16.

== Honours ==
=== Regional ===
- Región I:

Winners (1): 2012
Runner-up (1): 2007

- Liga Departamental de Tumbes:

Winners (4): 2001, 2003, 2005, 2012
Runner-up (1): 2007

- Liga Superior de Tumbes:

Winners (2): 2010, 2012
Runner-up (2): 2009, 2014

- Liga Provincial de Tumbes:

Winners (1): 2003
Runner-up (1): 2007

- Liga Distrital de Tumbes:

Winners (1): 2007

== See also ==
- List of football clubs in Peru
- Peruvian football league system
