= Sportivo Huracán =

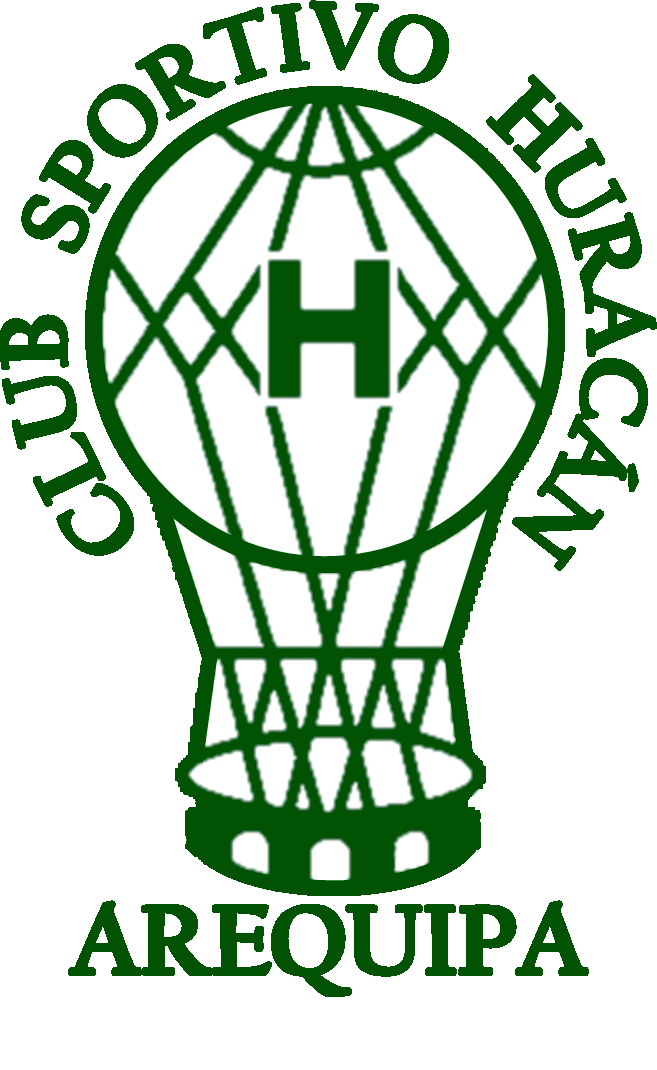
- Full name: Club Sportivo Huracán
- Nicknames: Huracán, Furia verde, Funebreros, Verdolagas
- Founded: January 12, 1927
- Ground: Estadio Melgar, Arequipa
- Capacity: 20,000
- Chairman: Giovani Linares Rivera
- Manager: Julio Alberto Zamora
- League: Copa Perú
- 2018: Round of 16
- Website: http://www.clubsportivohuracan.8k.com/
| Home colours | Away colours |

Sportivo Huracán is a Peruvian football club, based in the city of Arequipa, Peru.

The club was founded on January 12, 1927. Sportivo Huracán now plays in the Copa Perú, which is the third division of the Peruvian league after deciding to no longer participate in the Peruvian Segunda División.

== History ==
The club was the 1973 Copa Perú champion, defeating Cienciano, Colegio Nacional Iquitos, and Octavio Espinoza de Ica in the process.

The club once played in the Torneo Descentralizado, the highest level of Peruvian football league, until 1973 when the team opted to move down a division.

In the 2010 Copa Perú, the club qualified to the National Stage, but was eliminated by Alianza Unicachi of Puno in the quarterfinals.

In the 2011 Torneo Intermedio, the club was eliminated by Sport Áncash in the Round of 16.

In the 2011 Copa Perú, the club qualified to the National Stage, but was eliminated by Real Garcilaso of Cuzco in the quarterfinals.

It was invited to play in the Peruvian Segunda División from the 2013 season on.

== Rivalries ==
Sportivo Huracán has had a long-standing rivalry with Melgar, Aurora, and Piérola.

== Statistics and results in First Division ==
=== League history ===
| Season | Div. | Pos. | Pl. | W | D | L | GF | GA | P | Notes |
|---|---|---|---|---|---|---|---|---|---|---|
| 1973 | 1st | 8 | 34 | 13 | 8 | 13 | 40 | 49 | 34 | 8/18 Regular season |

== Honours ==
=== Senior titles ===
Keys

- Record
- ^{(s)} Shared record

| Type | Competition | Titles | Runner-up | Winning years | Runner-up years |
|---|---|---|---|---|---|
| National (League) | Copa Perú | 1 | 2 | 1973 | 1975, 1995 |
| Regional (League) | Región VI | 1 | — | 1995 | — |
| Regional (League) | Región VII | 3 | — | 2010, 2011, 2012 | — |
| Regional (League) | Liga Departamental de Arequipa | 12 | 4 | 1966, 1972, 1974, 1976, 1977, 1980, 1983, 1990, 1995, 1999, 2003, 2018 | 1979, 2010, 2015, 2017 |
| Regional (League) | Liga Provincial de Arequipa | 19 | 1 | 1929–II, 1932–I, 1967, 1972, 1974, 1976, 1977, 1978, 1979, 1980, 1981, 1983, 1990, 1995, 1999, 2003, 2015, 2018, 2023 | 2017 |
| Regional (League) | Liga Superior de Arequipa | 1 | — | 2010 | — |
| Regional (League) | Liga Distrital de Arequipa | 16 | 2 | 1966, 1972, 1974, 1976, 1979, 1986, 1995, 2001, 2003, 2004, 2008, 2015, 2017, 2018, 2024, 2026 | 1967, 2023 |

== See also ==
- List of football clubs in Peru
- Peruvian football league system
