= Alfonso Ugarte de Puno =

Alfonso Ugarte
- Full name: Club Deportivo Alfonso Ugarte
- Nicknames: Los Altiplánicos, Rojiblancos, La Franja Cruzada
- Founded: 1928; 98 years ago
- Ground: Estadio E. Torres Belón; Puno, Perú
- Capacity: 20,000
- Chairman: (Peru) Máximo Ylla Quillahuamán
- Manager: (Peru) Érick Torres
- League: Liga 2
- 2022: Liga 2, 5th
Home colours	Away colours	Third colours

Club Deportivo Alfonso Ugarte is a Peruvian association football club, based in the city of Puno. The club is the biggest in the city of Puno. It was founded in 1928 and play in the Peruvian Segunda Division which is the second division of the Peruvian league.

== History ==
=== 1975 National Runner-up ===
The 1975 Copa Libertadores squad featured Walter Seminario in goal, while the defense was led by Paraguayan Ángel Amidey Pereyra and Jorge Arrelucea. In midfield, Wálter Daga stood out, while the attack relied on Ernesto Neyra and José Leyva, who had previously finished as the top scorer of the national championship with 26 goals.

=== Relegation to Copa Perú ===
In 1999, more experienced in the competition, Alfonso Ugarte secured its place in the National Stage with a 3–0 victory over Deportivo Tintaya, earning nine points and finishing ahead of the Cusco-based side and the multiple-time champion Deportivo Maldonado.

=== Copa Perú Runner-up and Return to the Second Division ===
However, following an internal meeting, the club’s board dismissed both the manager and several players, later appointing César Gonzáles as Flores’ replacement.

In the final, Alfonso Ugarte fell 2–0 to UTC in Cajamarca. Although the club won the second leg 3–2 in Puno after trailing 2–0, it was not enough to secure promotion back to the First Division, and the team instead returned to the Second Division.

=== Crisis, Disqualification and Relegation ===
In 2023, Alfonso Ugarte faced serious financial difficulties, including unpaid salaries owed to players dating back to the previous season.

The club’s first major issue arose on Matchday 20, when it was scheduled to host Unión Huaral at the Monumental de la UNA Stadium. The match was not played because the pitch was deemed unfit, leading the Huaral side to file a claim for the points.

== Honours ==
=== Senior titles ===
Keys

- Record
- ^{(s)} Shared record

Type	Competition	Titles	Runner-up	Winning years	Runner-up years
National (League)	Primera División	—	1	—	1975
National (League)	Segunda División	—	1	—	2013
National (League)	Intermedia (1984–1987)	2	—	1984 Zona Sur, 1986 Zona Sur	—
National (League)	Copa Perú	—	3	—	1999, 2012, 2021
Half-year / Short tournament (League)	Torneo Zona Sur	—	1	—	1987
Regional (League)	Región VII	3	1	1998, 1999, 2001	2000
Regional (League)	Región VIII	—	1	—	2012
Regional (League)	Región XII	1	—	1994	—
Regional (League)	Liga Departamental de Puno	12	6	1971, 1972, 1973, 1994, 1998, 1999, 2000, 2001, 2005, 2012, 2017, 2018	2002, 2003, 2004, 2008, 2015, 2019
Regional (League)	Liga Superior de Puno	1	—	2012	—
Regional (League)	Liga Provincial de Puno	2	1	2018, 2019	2017
Regional (League)	Liga Distrital de Puno	1	—	2017	—

== Performance in CONMEBOL competitions ==
- Copa Libertadores: 1 appearance

1976: First Round

== See also ==
- List of football clubs in Peru
- Peruvian football league system
