= Defensor San José =

Peruvian football club

- Full name: Club Defensor San José
- Nickname: La naranja mecánica
- Founded: February 13, 1965
- Ground: Estadio Mariscal Cáceres, Tumbes
- Capacity: 12,000
- Chairman: Arnaldo Freyre
- Manager: Jorge Machuca
- League: Copa Perú
- 2017: Liga Superior, 5th
Home colours	Away colours

Defensor San José is a Peruvian football club, playing in the city of Tumbes, Peru.

The club was founded 13 February 1965 and plays in the Copa Perú, which is the third division of the Peruvian league.

== History ==
In the 2009 Copa Perú, the club qualified to the National Stage, but was eliminated by Tecnológico in the semifinals.

In the 2010 Copa Perú, the club qualified to the National Stage, but was eliminated by Unión Comercio in the round of 16.

== Honours ==
=== Regional ===
- Región I: 2

Winners (2): 2009, 2010

- Liga Departamental de Tumbes:

Winners (1): 2009
Runner-up (1): 2010

- Liga Provincial de Tumbes:

Winners (1): 2009

- Liga Distrital de Tumbes:

Winners (1): 2009

== See also ==
- List of football clubs in Peru
- Peruvian football league system
