= Sport Pampas =

- Full name: Club Social Sport Pampas
- Nickname(s): El Ballet Celeste
- Founded: May 5, 1964; 60 years ago
- Ground: Estadio Mariscal Cáceres, Tumbes
- League: Copa Perú
| Home colours | Away colours |

Club Social Sport Pampas (sometimes referred as Sport Pampas) is a Peruvian football club, playing in the city of Tumbes, Peru.

== History ==
The Club Social Sport Pampas was founded on May 5, 1964.

In 2000 Copa Perú, the club qualified to the Regional Stage, but was eliminated by Atlético Grau in the Group Stage.

In 2006 Copa Perú, the club qualified to the Regional Stage, but was eliminated by Juan Aurich in the Group Stage.

In 2009 Copa Perú, the club was the 2009 Ligas Superior de Tumbes champion but was eliminated in the Departamental Stage.

In 2012 Copa Perú, the club qualified to the Departamental Stage, but was eliminated when it finished in 6th place.

In 2015 Copa Perú, the club qualified to the Provincial Stage, but was eliminated in the Group Stage.

== Honours ==
=== Regional ===
- Liga Departamental de Tumbes:

Winners (3): 1983, 2000, 2006

- Liga Superior de Tumbes:

Winners (1): 2009
Runner-up (1): 2012

- Liga Distrital de Pampas de Hospital:

Winners (3): 2015, 2017, 2022

== See also ==
- List of football clubs in Peru
- Peruvian football league system
