= Sport José Pardo =

José Pardo
- Full name: Club Sport José Pardo
- Nickname: Los azucareros
- Founded: October 19, 1919
- Ground: Estadio Eugenio Zapata Mingoya de Tumán, Tumán
- League: Copa Perú
Home colours	Away colours

Club Sport José Pardo is a Peruvian football club, playing in the city of Tumán, Lambayeque, Peru.

The club is the biggest of Tumán city, and one of the biggest in Lambayeque Province.

The club was founded 19 October 1919 and plays in the Copa Perú, which is the third division of the Peruvian league.

== History ==
=== Foundation ===
Sport José Pardo was founded on October 19, 1919, by a group of workers from the Tumán sugar plantation. The club’s first president was Pedro Horna.

=== Amateur Era ===
During the 1940s, Sport José Pardo joined the Liga Distrital de Chiclayo, where it won its first district title in 1947. The club later achieved a three-peat after winning the 1948 and 1949 championships.

=== Professional Era ===
Later, as a consequence of the Peruvian Agrarian Reform and in order to avoid being associated with any landowner, Sport José Pardo changed its name to Unión Tumán Deportes. Under that name, the club competed in the 1971 Copa Perú, finishing as runner-up and earning promotion to the Torneo Descentralizado alongside champions FBC Melgar and José Gálvez FBC.

The sugar mill club’s best campaign came in 1974, when it qualified for the Pre-Libertadores Liguilla.

However, one year later, despite finishing 15th out of 18 teams, the club was relegated due to a regulation that mandated the relegation not only of the bottom-placed team, but also of the worst-performing club from any department outside Lima that had more than two representatives in the First Division. As a result, Unión Tumán Deportes was relegated and returned to compete in the Copa Perú.

=== Return to Copa Perú ===
In the late 1990s, a club assembly decided to restore Sport José Pardo’s original name after having competed for years as Unión Tumán Deportes.

In 2014, after several seasons playing in the Liga Superior de Lambayeque, the club returned to the Liga Distrital de Tumán, where it qualified for the Provincial Stage and later advanced to the Departmental Stage as provincial runner-up. The following year, José Pardo once again reached the Departmental Stage, but was eliminated in the semifinals by Construcción Civil.

== Rivalries ==
Sport José Pardo's main rival is Deportivo Pomalca, with whom they contest the so-called “Sugar Derby” (“Clásico Azucarero”).

There is also a long-standing rivalry with Juan Aurich, stemming from the fact that both clubs competed in the Peruvian First Division in 1975. However, over time the rivalry has largely faded away, remaining mostly in the memories of the older sugar-industry supporters.

== Honours ==
=== Senior titles ===
Keys

- Record
- ^{(s)} Shared record

Type	Competition	Titles	Runner-up	Winning years	Runner-up years
National (League)	Copa Perú	—	1	—	1971
Half-year / Short tournament (League)	Torneo Interzonal	—	1	—	1972 Regional
Regional (League)	Región Norte A	1	—	1971	—
Regional (League)	Liga Departamental de Lambayeque	3	—	1969, 1970, 1978	—
Regional (League)	Liga Provincial de Chiclayo	1	2	2009	2014, 2015
Regional (League)	Liga Distrital de Tumán	2	3	2019, 2024	2014, 2015, 2023
Regional (League)	Liga Distrital de Chiclayo	12	3	1947, 1948, 1949, 1953, 1956, 1959, 1969, 1970, 1978, 1979, 1993, 2000	1946, 1957, 1961

== See also ==
- List of football clubs in Peru
- Peruvian football league system
