= Asociación Deportiva Somos Aduanas =

Peruvian football club

Somos Aduanas
- Full name: Asociación Deportiva Somos Aduanas
- Founded: 1996
- Ground: Estadio Miguel Grau, Callao
- Capacity: 15,000
- League: Copa Perú
Home colours

Asociación Deportiva Somos Aduanas is a Peruvian football club, playing in the city of Bellavista, Callao, Lima.

== History ==
The Asociación Deportiva Somos Aduanas was founded in 1996.

In the 2001 Copa Perú, Somos Aduanas qualified to the National Stage, but was eliminated by C.D. Universidad Nacional de Ucayali.

The club played in the Segunda Division Peruana from 2002 until 2005, when it was relegated to the Copa Perú.

== Honours ==
=== Regional ===
- Región IV:

Winners (1): 2001
Runner-up (1): 1999

- Liga Departamental de Callao:

Winners (3): 1998, 1999, 2001

- Liga Superior del Callao:

Runner-up (1): 2015

- Liga Distrital de La Perla:

Winners (4): 1997, 1998, 1999, 2001
Runner-up (1): 2010

== See also ==
- List of football clubs in Peru
- Peruvian football league system
