= 2014 Peruvian Segunda División =

Peruvian Segunda División
- Season: 2014
- Dates: 26 April – 30 November 2014
- Champions: Deportivo Municipal
- Relegated: José Gálvez; Walter Ormeño
- Matches: 238
- Top goalscorer: Carlos Pérez (22 goals)
- Biggest home win: Carlos A. Mannucci 5–0 Alfonso Ugarte (Nov. 30); Deportivo Coopsol 5–0 Alfonso Ugarte (Jul. 12)
- Biggest away win: Comerciantes Unidos 0–4 Alfonso Ugarte (Nov. 1)
- Highest scoring: Sport Boys 4–3 Carlos A. Mannucci
- Highest attendance: 12,483; Defensor San Alejandro 2–1 Torino (Jun. 1)
- Total attendance: 376,496
- Average attendance: 1,582

The 2014 Segunda División season, was the 62nd edition of the second tier of Federación Peruana de Futbol. The tournament was played on a home-and-away round-robin basis.

== Teams ==
=== Promotion and relegation (pre-season) ===
A total of 16 teams played in the league, 2 more from the previous season. They include 10 sides from the 2013 season, four from the 2013 Copa Perú, and two relegated from the 2013 Torneo Descentralizado.

Pacífico and José Gálvez were relegated from the 2013 Torneo Descentralizado. Pacífico made an immediately return to the Segunda División after being promoted the previous year. José Gálvez was relegated for the sixth time after a brief two-year tenure in the top division thus becoming the Peruvian side with the most promotions and relegations in history. Los Caimanes was promoted to the Torneo Descentralizado as the champion.

The teams which had been relegated from the Segunda División the previous season were Sport Áncash, Alianza Cristiana, and Sportivo Huracán. Both Sport Áncash and Alianza Cristiana were disabled mid-season and relegated to the Copa Perú for outstanding debts with the SAFAP. Sport Huracán retired for financial reasons and was relegated to the Copa Perú.

Four Copa Perú teams were promoted: Union Huaral, Willy Serrato, Carlos A. Mannucci and Comerciantes Unidos. Union Huaral was promoted as 2013 Copa Perú runner-up. Willy Serrato, Carlos A. Mannucci and Comerciantes Unidos were invited to fill in the vacated spots after a strict financial analysis.

=== Team changes ===
Promoted from 2013 Copa Perú	Relegated from 2013 Primera División	Promoted to 2014 Primera División	Relegated to 2014 Copa Perú	Retired
▲ Unión Huaral (2nd) ▲ Willy Serrato (3rd) ▲ Carlos A. Mannucci (8th) ▲ Comerciantes Unidos (9th)	▼ Pacífico (15th) ▼ José Gálvez (16th)	▲ Los Caimanes (1st)	▼ Sport Áncash (13th) ▼ Alianza Cristiana (14th)	▼ Sportivo Huracán (Retired)

=== Stadia and Locations ===
Locations of the 2014 Segunda División teams

Team	City	Stadium	Capacity
Alfonso Ugarte	Puno	Enrique Torres Belón	20,000
Alianza Universidad	Huánuco	Heraclio Tapia	15,000
Atlético Minero	Matucana	Municipal de Matucana	5,000
Atlético Torino	Talara	Campeonísimo	8,000
Carlos A. Mannucci	Trujillo	Mansiche	25,000
Comerciantes Unidos	Cutervo	Juan Maldonado Gamarra	8,000
Deportivo Coopsol	Chancay	Rómulo Shaw Cisneros	13,000
Deportivo Municipal	Lima	Municipal de Chorrillos	10,000
Defensor San Alejandro	Aguaytía	Aliardo Soria Pérez	15,000
José Gálvez	Chimbote	Manuel Rivera Sánchez	25,000
Pacífico	Lima	Miguel Grau	17,000
Sport Boys	Callao	Miguel Grau	15,000
Sport Victoria	Ica	José Picasso Peratta	8,000
Unión Huaral	Huaral	Julio Lores Colan	10,000
Walter Ormeño	Cañete	Oscar Ramos Cabieses	8,000
Willy Serrato	Pimentel	Elías Aguirre	24,500

== League table ==
=== Standings ===
Pos	Team	Pld	W	D	L	GF	GA	GD	Pts	Promotion or relegation
1	Deportivo Municipal (C)	30	18	7	5	49	30	+19	61	2015 Primera División
2	Deportivo Coopsol	30	17	7	6	53	26	+27	58	
3	Carlos A. Mannucci	30	17	5	8	46	32	+14	56 (Note: Pacífico defeated Carlos A. Mannucci by walkover because Mannucci posted political advertisement on their jersey.)	
4	Alianza Universidad	30	15	8	7	51	30	+21	53 (Note: Alianza Universidad defeated Alfonso Ugarte by walkover after Alfonso Ugarte received five red cards. Alfonso Ugarte was docked a total of 4 points for outstanding debts with the SAFAP)	
5	Willy Serrato	30	12	10	8	44	37	+7	46	
6	Unión Huaral	30	11	7	12	38	37	+1	40	
7	Defensor San Alejandro	30	10	9	11	37	37	0	39	
8	Atlético Minero	30	10	9	11	30	40	−10	39	
9	Atlético Torino	30	9	10	11	37	34	+3	37	
10	Alfonso Ugarte	30	11	6	13	36	51	−15	35	
11	Pacífico	30	9	8	13	33	44	−11	35	
12	Sport Boys	30	8	13	9	42	47	−5	33 (Note: Sport Boys was docked a total of 2 points for outstanding debts with the SAFAP)	
13	Sport Victoria	30	7	10	13	32	39	−7	31	
14	Comerciantes Unidos	30	7	9	14	29	36	−7	30	
15	José Gálvez (R)	30	7	10	13	25	39	−14	25 (Note: José Gálvez was docked a total of 6 points for outstanding debts with the SAFAP)	2015 Copa Perú
16	Walter Ormeño (R)	30	4	9	17	22	47	−25	19 (Note: Walter Ormeño was docked a total of 2 points for outstanding debts with the SAFAP)	2015 Copa Perú

Updated to match(es) played on November 29, 2014. Source: ADFP-SD - official site
Rules for classification: 1) points; 2) goal difference; 3) number of goals scored; 4) head-to-head record; 5) drawing of lots
(C) Champions; (R) Relegated

== Results ==
Home \ Away	AU	AUN	ATM	ATT	CAM	COM	DSA	COO	DMU	GAL	PAC	SBA	VIC	HUA	WOR	WSP
Alfonso Ugarte		1–1	1–0	1–1	1–0	1–3	3–2	0–1	0–1	2–0	1–0	3–1	0–0	2–1	1–0	2–2
Alianza Universidad	3–0		4–1	1–0	1–2	1–0	5–1	2–0	3–1	4–0	1–2	3–2	3–1	1–1	3–0	2–1
Atlético Minero	1–2	3–2		3–3	2–0	0–0	1–0	2–2	2–1	1–1	1–0	1–1	3–1	2–1	1–0	0–0
Atlético Torino	2–2	1–1	1–0		0–0	0–0	0–0	1–2	3–0	2–3	2–1	2–0	3–1	1–2	3–0	1–0
Carlos A. Mannucci	5–0	2–1	4–0	3–2		2–0	1–0	1–3	2–1	1–0	3–1	1–1	2–1	2–2	1–0	2–0
Comerciantes Unidos	0–4	0–0	3–0	3–0	1–2		2–1	1–2	0–1	1–1	5–1	0–0	1–0	0–1	4–1	0–2
Defensor San Alejandro	3–1	2–2	2–0	2–1	1–0	1–1		2–2	1–2	2–0	3–0	4–1	1–2	2–1	1–1	1–1
Deportivo Coopsol	5–0	3–0	3–1	2–0	0–0	2–0	0–1		0–2	4–0	2–0	2–0	3–0	2–1	2–1	1–1
Deportivo Municipal	3–0	2–0	0–0	2–1	2–0	1–0	1–2	3–2		2–1	2–1	1–1	3–1	3–2	1–0	5–1
José Gálvez	2–1	0–0	3–0	1–0	0–1	2–2	0–0	1–0	1–1		1–1	2–2	1–1	1–0	0–2	0–1
Pacífico	3–2	0–1	0–0	2–2	3–0	2–1	2–1	0–1	1–1	1–0		1–1	3–1	0–1	2–1	1–1
Sport Boys	0–2	1–1	1–2	0–0	4–3	2–0	0–0	2–1	2–2	3–1	2–2		2–2	4–2	3–1	2–2
Sport Victoria	0–0	0–1	1–0	0–0	2–1	4–0	1–0	0–2	1–1	1–1	3–0	0–1		1–1	0–0	5–1
Unión Huaral	4–2	2–1	1–0	0–2	0–1	1–1	2–0	1–1	0–2	0–1	2–0	2–0	2–1		1–1	3–1
Walter Ormeño	2–1	1–3	1–1	1–3	1–3	0–0	1–1	1–1	0–1	1–0	1–2	0–3	0–0	0–0		2–1
Willy Serrato	4–0	0–0	1–2	1–0	2–1	1–0	3–0	2–2	1–1	2–1	1–1	4–0	2–0	2–1	3–1	

Updated to match(es) played on June 1, 2014. Source: ADFP-SD - official fixture
Legend: Blue = home team win; Yellow = draw; Red = away team win.

== See also ==
- 2014 Torneo Descentralizado
- 2014 Copa Perú
- 2014 in Peruvian football
