= 2012 Copa Perú =

Copa Perú
- Season: 2012
- Champions: UTC (2nd Title)
- Biggest home win: Grau 14 - 2 Municipal (RdM)
- Biggest away win: Manco II 1 - 6 Alfonso Ugarte; AEXA Santa Cruz 0 - 5 Sportivo Huracán
- Highest scoring: Grau 14 - 2 Municipal (RdM); Only Regional and National Stages taken into consideration

The 2012 Copa Perú season (Spanish: Copa Perú 2012), the promotion tournament of Peruvian football, started on February.

The tournament has 5 stages. The first four stages are played as mini-league round-robin tournaments, except for third stage in region IV, which is played as a knockout stage. The final stage features two knockout rounds and a final four-team group stage to determine the two promoted teams.

The 2012 Peru Cup started with the District Stage (Spanish: Etapa Distrital) on February. The next stage was the Provincial Stage (Spanish: Etapa Provincial) which started on June. The tournament continued with the Departamental Stage (Spanish: Etapa Departamental) on July. The Regional Stage follow in September. The National Stage (Spanish: Etapa Nacional) starts in November. The winner of the National Stage will be promoted to the First Division and the runner-up will be promoted to the Second Division.

== Department Stage ==
Department Stage: 2012 Ligas Departamentales del Peru and 2012 Ligas Superiores del Peru

The following list shows the teams that qualified for the Regional Stage.

Department	Team	Location
Amazonas	Deportivo Municipal (RdM)	Amazonas
Amazonas	Grupo Malca	Amazonas
Ancash	Unión Juventud	Chimbote
Ancash	Huracán (Toma)	Carhuaz
Apurímac	Apurímac	Apurímac
Apurímac	José María Arguedas	Andahuaylas
Arequipa	José Granda	Camaná
Arequipa	Aurora	Arequipa
Arequipa	Sportivo Huracán	Arequipa
Arequipa	Unión Minas de Orcopampa	Orcopampa
Ayacucho	Sport Libertad	Ayacucho
Ayacucho	Deportivo Municipal (Pichari)	Ayacucho
Cajamarca	Alianza Cutervo	Cutervo
Cajamarca	Cruzeiro Porcón	Cajamarca
Cajamarca	UTC	Cajamarca
Callao	Márquez	Callao
Callao	Juventud La Perla	Callao
Cusco	Manco II	Cusco
Cusco	Estudiantes Agropecuario	Cusco
Huancavelica	Deportivo Municipal (Yauli)	Yauli
Huancavelica	UDA	Huancavelica
Huánuco	UNHEVAL	Huánuco
Huánuco	Unión Castillo Grande	Leoncio Prado
Ica	Santos	Ica
Ica	Mayta Cápac	Nazca
Ica	Defensor Zarumilla	Nazca
Ica	Sport Victoria	Ica
Junín	Alipio Ponce	Junín
Junín	Deportivo Municipal (Mazamari)	Junín
Junín	ADT	Tarma
La Libertad	Carlos A. Mannucci	Trujillo
La Libertad	Juventud Bellavista	Trujillo
La Libertad	Universitario Grau	Huamachuco

Department	Team	Location
Lambayeque	Deportivo Pomalca	Lambayeque
Lambayeque	Willy Serrato	Chiclayo
Lima	Deportivo Municipal	Lima
Lima	Walter Ormeño	Cañete
Lima	Géminis	Lima
Lima	U América	Lima
Loreto	Alianza Cristiana	Loreto
Loreto	UNAP	Iquitos
Loreto	Los Tigres	Iquitos
Loreto	CNI	Iquitos
Madre de Dios	MINSA	Tambopata
Madre de Dios	Deportivo Maldonado	Puerto Maldonado
Moquegua	Social EPISA	Moquegua
Moquegua	AEXA Santa Cruz	Moquegua
Pasco	Rancas	Pasco
Pasco	Juventud Ticlacayán	Pasco
Piura	José Olaya (Paita)	Paita
Piura	José Olaya (Sechura)	Sechura
Piura	Atlético Grau	Piura
Piura	Rosario Central	Sechura
Puno	Alfonso Ugarte	Puno
Puno	Binacional	Puno
Puno	Franciscano San Román	Juliaca
San Martín	Santos	San Martín
San Martín	Sport Alto Mayo	San Martín
Tacna	Deportivo Credicoop	Tacna
Tacna	Bolognesi Zepita	Tacna
Tumbes	Sporting Pizarro	Tumbes
Tumbes	Académicos Alfred Nobel	Tumbes
Ucayali	Defensor San Alejandro	Aguaytía
Ucayali	Deportivo Municipal (Purús)	Purús
Ucayali	UNU	Pucallpa

== Regional Stage ==
Each region had two teams qualify for the next stage. The playoffs only determined the respective regional winners.

=== Region I ===
Region I includes qualified teams from Amazonas, Lambayeque, Tumbes and Piura region.

==== Group A ====
Pos	Team	Pld	W	D	L	GF	GA	GD	Pts	Qualification	AAN	GRA	POM	MRM	JOS
1	Académicos Alfred Nobel	5	5	0	0	11	2	+9	15	National stage		1–0	2–0	W.O.	W.O.
2	Atlético Grau	5	3	1	1	19	4	+15	10		W.O.		W.O.	14–2	2–1
3	Deportivo Pomalca	5	1	2	2	5	6	−1	5		1–3	0–0		W.O.	W.O.
4	Deportivo Municipal (RdM)	4	1	1	2	6	17	−11	4		1–2	W.O.	1–1		3–0
5	José Olaya (Sechura)	5	0	0	5	1	14	−13	0		0–3	0–3	0–3	W.O.	

Legend: Blue = home team win; Yellow = draw; Red = away team win.

==== Group B ====
Pos	Team	Pld	W	D	L	GF	GA	GD	Pts	Qualification	SPP	WSP	JOP	RCS	GMA
1	Sporting Pizarro	6	5	1	0	13	4	+9	16	National stage		2–1	1–0	3–1	W.O.
2	Willy Serrato	6	2	3	1	10	4	+6	9		1–1		W.O.	W.O.	4–0
3	José Olaya (Paita)	5	2	1	2	3	6	−3	7		W.O.	0–0		2–1	1–0
4	Rosario Central	5	2	0	3	9	9	0	6		0–3	0–3	W.O.		3–1
5	Grupo Malca	6	1	1	4	7	12	−5	4		1–3	1–1	4–0	W.O.	

Legend: Blue = home team win; Yellow = draw; Red = away team win.

==== Regional Final ====
Team 1	Score	Team 2
Sporting Pizarro	0–0 (5–4 p)	Académicos Alfred Nobel

=== Region II ===
Region II includes qualified teams from Ancash, Cajamarca, La Libertad and San Martín region.

==== Group A ====
Pos	Team	Pld	W	D	L	GF	GA	GD	Pts	Qualification	JVB	CPO	UJV
1	Juventud Bellavista	4	3	1	0	5	0	+5	10	Región II - Semifinals		0–0	2–0
2	Cruzeiro Porcón	3	0	2	1	0	2	−2	2		0–2		W.O.
3	Unión Juventud	3	0	1	2	0	3	−3	1		0–1	0–0	

Legend: Blue = home team win; Yellow = draw; Red = away team win.

==== Group B ====
Pos	Team	Pld	W	D	L	GF	GA	GD	Pts	Qualification	ACU	UNT	SSM	HUT
1	Alianza Cutervo	6	4	2	0	11	3	+8	14	Región II - Semifinals		2–0	3–2	4–0
2	Universitario Grau	6	2	3	1	7	5	+2	9		0–0		1–1	1–0
3	Santos	6	1	3	2	11	9	+2	6		1–1	2–2		5–0
4	Huracán (Toma)	6	1	0	5	2	14	−12	3		0–1	0–3	2–0	

Legend: Blue = home team win; Yellow = draw; Red = away team win.

==== Group C ====
Pos	Team	Pld	W	D	L	GF	GA	GD	Pts	Qualification	UTC	SAM	CAM
1	UTC	4	3	0	1	9	4	+5	9	Región II - Semifinals		3–0	3–0
2	Sport Alto Mayo	4	3	0	1	9	5	+4	9	Región II - Semifinals	3–1		3–1
3	Carlos A. Mannucci	4	0	0	4	2	11	−9	0		1–2	0–3	

Legend: Blue = home team win; Yellow = draw; Red = away team win.

===== Tiebreaker =====
Team 1	Score	Team 2
UTC	1–0	Sport Alto Mayo

==== Tiebreaker ====
Team 1	Score	Team 2
Sport Alto Mayo	3–3 (5–3 p)	Universitario Grau

==== Semifinals ====
Team 1	Agg.	Team 2	1st leg	2nd leg
Juventud Bellavista	4–4	Sport Alto Mayo	1–4	3–0
Alianza Cutervo	3–7	UTC	2–3	1–4

=== Region III ===
Region III includes qualified teams from Loreto and Ucayali region.

==== Group A ====
Pos	Team	Pld	W	D	L	GF	GA	GD	Pts	Qualification	ACR	LTI	DMP	UNA
1	Alianza Cristiana	3	2	1	0	5	2	+3	7	National stage			2–0	2–1
2	Los Tigres	3	2	1	0	6	4	+2	7		1–1			
3	Deportivo Municipal (Purús)	3	1	0	2	3	4	−1	3			1–2		2–0
4	UNAP	3	0	0	3	3	7	−4	0			2–3		

Legend: Blue = home team win; Yellow = draw; Red = away team win.

===== Tiebreaker =====
Team 1	Score	Team 2
Alianza Cristiana	2–1	Los Tigres

==== Group B ====
Pos	Team	Pld	W	D	L	GF	GA	GD	Pts	Qualification	DSA	CNI	UNU
1	Defensor San Alejandro	2	2	0	0	4	2	+2	6	National stage		3–2	
2	CNI	2	1	0	1	4	4	0	3				2–1
3	UNU	2	0	0	2	1	3	−2	0		0–1		

Legend: Blue = home team win; Yellow = draw; Red = away team win.

==== Regional Final ====
Team 1	Score	Team 2
Alianza Cristiana	2–1	Defensor San Alejandro

=== Region IV ===
Region IV includes qualified teams from Lima and Callao region.

==== First round ====
Team 1	Agg.	Team 2	1st leg	2nd leg
Deportivo Municipal	5–0	Juventud La Perla	1–0	4–0
Géminis	1–1 (2–4 p)	Walter Ormeño	1–0	0–1
U América	3–3	Márquez	2–2	1–1

==== Semifinals ====
Team 1	Agg.	Team 2	1st leg	2nd leg
Deportivo Municipal	0–0 (4–3 p)	Géminis	0–0	0–0
Walter Ormeño	8–1	Márquez	3–0	5–1

==== Regional Final ====
Team 1	Score	Team 2
Walter Ormeño	1–0	Deportivo Municipal

=== Region V ===
Region V includes qualified teams from Junín, Pasco and Huánuco region.

==== Group A ====
Pos	Team	Pld	W	D	L	GF	GA	GD	Pts	Qualification	JVT	APM	UCG
1	Juventud Ticlacayán	4	3	0	1	13	2	+11	9	National stage		0–1	10–0
2	Alipio Ponce	4	3	0	1	7	3	+4	9		0–1		2–1
3	Unión Castillo Grande	4	0	0	4	3	18	−15	0		1–2	1–4	

Legend: Blue = home team win; Yellow = draw; Red = away team win.

===== Tiebreaker =====
Team 1	Score	Team 2
Alipio Ponce	2–3	Juventud Ticlacayán

==== Group B ====
Pos	Team	Pld	W	D	L	GF	GA	GD	Pts	Qualification	DMM	UNH	RAN	ADT
1	Deportivo Municipal (Mazamari)	6	5	0	1	13	6	+7	15	National stage		4–1	2–1	2–0
2	UNHEVAL	6	3	1	2	9	12	−3	10		3–2		2–1	1–1
3	Rancas	6	3	0	3	12	7	+5	9		0–1	4–1		4–0
4	ADT	6	0	1	5	3	12	−9	1		1–2	0–1	1–2	

Legend: Blue = home team win; Yellow = draw; Red = away team win.

==== Regional Final ====
Team 1	Score	Team 2
Deportivo Municipal (Mazamari)	0–1	Juventud Ticlacayán

=== Region VI ===
Region VI includes qualified teams from Ayacucho, Huancavelica and Ica region. Two teams qualified from this stage.

==== Group A ====
Pos	Team	Pld	W	D	L	GF	GA	GD	Pts	Qualification	VIC	MUY	MCN	MUP
1	Sport Victoria	6	4	1	1	10	8	+2	13	National stage		1–1	2–1	3–0
2	Deportivo Municipal (Yauli)	6	3	3	0	14	6	+8	12		5–1		3–2	1–1
3	Mayta Cápac	5	1	1	3	6	8	−2	4		1–2	1–1		1–0
4	Deportivo Municipal (Pichari)	5	0	1	4	1	9	−8	1		0–1	0–3	W.O.	

Legend: Blue = home team win; Yellow = draw; Red = away team win.

==== Group B ====
Pos	Team	Pld	W	D	L	GF	GA	GD	Pts	Qualification	DZA	UDA	SLH	SAN
1	Defensor Zarumilla	6	2	4	0	9	4	+5	10	National stage		2–1	4–0	1–1
2	UDA	6	2	2	2	7	8	−1	8		0–0		3–2	2–1
3	Sport Libertad	6	2	2	2	9	12	−3	8		2–2	1–1		2–1
4	Santos	6	1	2	3	6	7	−1	5		0–0	2–0	2–3	

Legend: Blue = home team win; Yellow = draw; Red = away team win.

==== Final ====
Team 1	Score	Team 2
Sport Victoria	1–0	Defensor Zarumilla

=== Region VII ===
Region VII includes qualified teams from Arequipa, Moquegua and Tacna region.

==== Group A ====
Pos	Team	Pld	W	D	L	GF	GA	GD	Pts	Qualification	HUR	UMO	AUR	JGC
1	Sportivo Huracán	6	5	0	1	14	7	+7	15	Región VII - Semifinals		3–2	3–0	3–0
2	Unión Minas de Orcopampa	6	3	0	3	13	10	+3	9	Región VII - Semifinals	3–1		3–2	3–0
3	Aurora	6	2	1	3	9	12	−3	7		1–2	3–2		1–0
4	José Granda	6	1	1	4	4	11	−7	4		1–2	1–0	1–1	

Legend: Blue = home team win; Yellow = draw; Red = away team win.

==== Group B ====
Pos	Team	Pld	W	D	L	GF	GA	GD	Pts	Qualification	DPC	SEP	ASC	BZE
1	Deportivo Credicoop	6	5	0	1	13	4	+9	15	Región VII - Semifinals		1–0	1–0	4–1
2	Social EPISA	6	3	0	3	8	7	+1	9	Región VII - Semifinals	1–0		5–1	0–2
3	AEXA Santa Cruz	6	3	0	3	9	11	−2	9		1–3	3–0		1–0
4	Bolognesi Zepita	6	1	0	5	6	14	−8	3		1–4	0–2	2–3	

Legend: Blue = home team win; Yellow = draw; Red = away team win.

===== Tiebreaker =====
Team 1	Score	Team 2
AEXA Santa Cruz	0–0 (9–8 p)	Social EPISA

==== Semifinals ====
Team 1	Agg.	Team 2	1st leg	2nd leg
Deportivo Credicoop	4–1	Unión Minas de Orcopampa	1–1	3–0
Sportivo Huracán	6–1	AEXA Santa Cruz	5–0	1–1

==== Regional Final ====
Team 1	Agg.	Team 2	1st leg	2nd leg
Deportivo Credicoop	0–2	Sportivo Huracán	0–1	0–1

=== Region VIII ===
Region VIII includes qualified teams from Apurimac, Cusco, Madre de Dios and Puno region.

==== Group A ====
Pos	Team	Pld	W	D	L	GF	GA	GD	Pts	Qualification	ALF	JMA	MII	MLD
1	Alfonso Ugarte	6	5	0	1	23	4	+19	15	National stage		1–0	5–0	7–0
2	José María Arguedas	6	4	0	2	11	6	+5	12		2–1		2–0	3–0
3	Manco II	6	2	0	4	5	14	−9	6		1–6	2–0		3–0
4	Deportivo Maldonado	6	1	0	5	4	19	−15	3		1–3	2–4	1–0	

Legend: Blue = home team win; Yellow = draw; Red = away team win.

==== Group B ====
Pos	Team	Pld	W	D	L	GF	GA	GD	Pts	Qualification	FSR	EMB	APU	MIN	EAG
1	Franciscano San Román	8	5	1	2	12	5	+7	16			2–0	1–0	6–1	3–0
2	Binacional	8	5	1	2	15	10	+5	16	National stage	1–1		3–0	3–1	4–1
3	Apurímac	8	4	1	3	11	8	+3	13		2–1	3–0		0–0	3–2
4	MINSA	8	4	1	3	13	11	+2	13		1–0	1–2	1–0		7–0
5	Estudiantes Agropecuario	8	0	0	8	5	26	−21	0		1–2	1–2	0–3	0–2	

Legend: Blue = home team win; Yellow = draw; Red = away team win.

===== Tiebreaker =====
Team 1	Score	Team 2
Franciscano San Román	0–2	Binacional

==== Regional Final ====
Team 1	Score	Team 2
Alfonso Ugarte	0–0 (1–3 p)	Binacional

== National Stage ==
The National Stage starts on November. This stage has two knockout rounds and four-team group stage. The winner will be promoted to the 2013 Torneo Descentralizado and the runner-up of the National Stage will be promoted to the 2013 Peruvian Segunda División.

Round of 16
Sporting Pizarro	0	2	2 (4)
Juventud Bellavista	2	0	2 (3)
UTC	5	0	5
Académicos Alfred Nobel	1	3	4
Alianza Cristiana	2	1	3
Deportivo Municipal	0	3	3
Walter Ormeño	0	0	0
Defensor San Alejandro	0	3	3
Juventud Ticlacayán	1	2	2
Defensor Zarumilla	4	0	4
Sport Victoria	1	4	5
Deportivo Municipal (M)	3	0	3
Sportivo Huracán	4	0	4
Alfonso Ugarte	1	3	4
Binacional	2	1	3 (5)
Deportivo Credicoop	1	2	3 (4)

Quarterfinals
Sporting Pizarro	0	0	0
UTC	0	4	4
Alianza Cristiana	3	0	3
Defensor San Alejandro	0	2	2
Defensor Zarumilla	3	0	3 (3)
Sport Victoria	0	3	3 (4)
Alfonso Ugarte	0	3	3
Deportivo Credicoop	1	1	2

Semifinals
UTC	7	0	7
Alianza Cristiana	0	0	0
Sport Victoria	0	3	3
Alfonso Ugarte	4	1	5

Champion & Runner-Up
UTC	2	2	4
Alfonso Ugarte	0	3	3

=== Round of 16 ===
Team 1	Agg.	Team 2	1st leg	2nd leg
Sporting Pizarro	2–2 (4–3 p)	Juventud Bellavista	2–0	0–2
UTC	5–4	Académicos Alfred Nobel	5–1	0–3
Alianza Cristiana	3–3 (a)	Deportivo Municipal	2–0	1–3
Walter Ormeño	0–3	Defensor San Alejandro	0–0	0–3
Juventud Ticlacayán	3–4	Defensor Zarumilla	1–4	2–0
Sport Victoria	5–3	Deportivo Municipal (Mazamari)	1–3	4–0
Sportivo Huracán	4–4 (a)	Alfonso Ugarte	4–1	0–3
Binacional	3–3 (5–4 p)	Deportivo Credicoop	2–1	1–2

=== Quarterfinals ===
Team 1	Agg.	Team 2	1st leg	2nd leg
Sporting Pizarro	0–4	UTC	0–0	0–4
Alianza Cristiana	3–2	Defensor San Alejandro	3–0	0–2
Defensor Zarumilla	3–3 (3–4 p)	Sport Victoria	3–0	0–3
Deportivo Credicoop	2–3	Alfonso Ugarte	1–0	1–3

=== Play-off ===
Team 1	Score	Team 2
Académicos Alfred Nobel	1–2	UTC

=== Semifinals ===
Team 1	Agg.	Team 2	1st leg	2nd leg
UTC	7–0	Alianza Cristiana	7–0	0–0
Alfonso Ugarte	5–3	Sport Victoria	4–0	1–3

=== Final ===
Team 1	Agg.	Team 2	1st leg	2nd leg
UTC	4–3	Alfonso Ugarte	2–0	2–3

== See also ==
- 2012 Torneo Descentralizado
- 2012 Peruvian Segunda División
