= 2013 Peruvian Segunda División =

Peruvian Segunda División
- Season: 2013
- Dates: 20 April – 20 October 2013
- Champions: Los Caimanes
- Relegated: Sport Áncash; Alianza Cristiana
- Matches: 151
- Top goalscorer: Jesús Reyes (13 goals)
- Biggest home win: AUN 6–1 ÁNC
- Biggest away win: DSA 0–5 SBA
- Highest scoring: DSA 7–3 COO
- Highest attendance: 10,000; Sport Boys @ Alfonso Ugarte (July 7)
- Lowest attendance: 58; Coopsol @ Minero (Oct. 12)
- Total attendance: 251,502
- Average attendance: 1,666

The 2013 Segunda División, was the 61st edition of the second tier of Federación Peruana de Futbol. The season was played on a home-and-away round-robin basis.

- Cobresol and Coronel Bolognesi withdrew before the start of the season and was relegated to the Copa Perú for outstanding debts with the SAFAP.
- Sport Áncash and Alianza Cristiana were disabled and relegated to the Copa Perú for outstanding debts with the SAFAP.

== Teams ==
=== Team changes ===
Promoted from 2012 Copa Perú	Relegated from 2012 Primera División	Promoted to 2013 Primera División	Relegated to 2013 Copa Perú	Retired
▲ Alfonso Ugarte (2nd) ▲ Sport Victoria (3rd) ▲ Alianza Cristiana (4th) ▲ Defensor San Alejandro (7th) ▲ Sportivo Huracán (9th) ▲ Deportivo Municipal (11th) ▲ Walter Ormeño (16th)	▼ Sport Boys (15th) ▼ Cobresol (16th)	▲ Pacífico (1st)	▼ Alianza Unicachi (9th) ▼ Hijos de Acosvinchos (10th)	▼ Cobresol (Retired) ▼ Coronel Bolognesi (Retired)

=== Stadia and Locations ===
Locations of the 2013 Segunda División teams

Team	City	Stadium	Capacity
Alfonso Ugarte	Puno	Enrique Torres Belón	20,000
Alianza Cristiana	Iquitos	Max Augustín	24,576
Alianza Universidad	Huánuco	Heraclio Tapia	15,000
Atlético Minero	Matucana	Municipal de Matucana	5,000
Atlético Torino	Talara	Campeonísimo	8,000
Deportivo Coopsol	Chancay	Rómulo Shaw Cisneros	13,000
Deportivo Municipal	Lima	Municipal de Chorrillos	10,000
Defensor San Alejandro	Aguaytía	Aliardo Soria Pérez	15,000
Los Caimanes	Puerto Etén	Elias Aguirre	24,500
Sport Áncash	Huaraz	Rosas Pampa	18,000
Sport Boys	Callao	Miguel Grau	15,000
Sport Victoria	Ica	José Picasso Peratta	8,000
Sportivo Huracán	Arequipa	Mariano Melgar	15,000
Walter Ormeño	Cañete	Oscar Ramos Cabieses	8,000

== League table ==
=== Standings ===
Pos	Team	Pld	W	D	L	GF	GA	GD	Pts	Promotion or relegation
1	Los Caimanes (C)	26	14	10	2	50	28	+22	52	2014 Primera División
2	Alfonso Ugarte	26	15	4	7	45	18	+27	49	
3	Atlético Torino	26	14	4	8	44	30	+14	46	
4	Deportivo Coopsol	26	10	10	6	40	31	+9	40	
5	Alianza Universidad	26	10	10	6	52	45	+7	40	
6	Defensor San Alejandro	26	11	6	9	42	36	+6	39	
7	Sport Boys	26	12	7	7	35	34	+1	39 (Note: Sport Boys was docked a total of 4 points for outstanding debts with the SAFAP.)	
8	Walter Ormeño	26	10	8	8	31	25	+6	38	
9	Sportivo Huracán	26	7	15	4	33	26	+7	36	
10	Sport Victoria	26	10	4	12	27	32	−5	34	
11	Deportivo Municipal	26	8	6	12	31	32	−1	30	
12	Atlético Minero	26	7	7	12	22	27	−5	28	
13	Sport Áncash (D)	26	3	5	18	18	62	−44	10 (Note: Sport Ancash was docked a total of 4 points for outstanding debts with the SAFAP and was disabled and relegated to the Copa Perú.)	2014 Copa Perú
14	Alianza Cristiana (D)	26	1	2	23	8	68	−60	1 (Note: Alianza Cristiana was docked a total of 4 points for outstanding debts with the SAFAP and was disabled and relegated to the Copa Perú.)	2014 Copa Perú

Updated to match(es) played on September 2013. Source: http://www.adfp-sd.com/index.php/estadisticas.html?func=showResultsRank&p=4
Rules for classification: 1) points; 2) goal difference; 3) number of goals scored.
(C) Champions; (D) Disqualified

== Results ==
Home \ Away	AU	ACR	AUN	ATM	ATT	DSA	COO	DMU	CAI	ÁNC	SBA	VIC	HUR	WOR
Alfonso Ugarte		3–0	3–1	3–1	2–0	4–1	3–1	1–0	0–0	4–0	3–0	3–0	2–0	3–0
Alianza Cristiana	0–3		1–2	0–3	0–3	0–3	1–4	0–3	0–3	W.O.	0–3	0–0	0–3	0–3
Alianza Universidad	2–1	3–0		1–0	3–2	3–3	1–1	1–0	4–4	6–1	1–1	3–0	3–3	3–3
Atlético Minero	0–2	2–1	1–1		2–1	0–0	2–0	0–0	0–3	1–1	0–1	2–0	0–0	0–1
Atlético Torino	1–0	3–0	2–0	1–0		2–2	1–4	5–1	2–1	2–0	3–1	4–1	2–1	1–1
Defensor San Alejandro	2–0	3–0	5–1	1–0	1–0		7–3	3–1	1–3	2–0	0–5	0–1	1–1	1–0
Deportivo Coopsol	0–0	3–0	3–0	0–0	2–1	1–0		0–2	3–3	3–0	0–0	2–0	1–1	1–0
Deportivo Municipal	1–1	3–0	2–2	2–1	2–3	2–1	0–1		0–1	2–0	0–1	2–0	2–3	0–0
Los Caimanes	1–0	3–0	2–2	1–1	1–1	2–1	1–1	1–0		4–2	2–1	3–2	2–2	2–0
Sport Áncash	3–1	3–2	0–3	0–3	0–3	0–3	1–1	2–1	2–2		0–3	1–1	1–1	1–2
Sport Boys	1–0	2–1	2–3	0–1	0–1	0–0	2–2	2–1	0–2	2–0		2–1	0–0	1–0
Sport Victoria	0–1	3–0	1–0	1–0	1–0	3–1	2–1	1–2	0–1	3–0	0–2		1–1	2–0
Sportivo Huracán	2–1	0–1	1–1	2–1	0–0	3–1	1–0	2–2	1–1	3–0	1–1	1–1		0–1
Walter Ormeño	1–1	3–0	3–2	4–1	4–0	0–1	1–1	0–0	2–1	1–0	1–1	0–2	0–0	

Updated to match(es) played on pre-season. Source: RSSSF
Legend: Blue = home team win; Yellow = draw; Red = away team win.

== Top goalscorers ==
13 goals

- (Peru) Jesús Reyes (Alianza Universidad)

12 goals

- (Peru) Juan Pablo Vergara (Alfonso Ugarte)

10 goals

- (Peru) Janio Posito (Los Caimanes)

9 goals

- (Peru) Luis Laguna (Sport Victoria)
- (Peru) César Flores (Torino)
- (Peru) Alexander Salas (Alianza Universidad)
- (Brazil) Smith (Alianza Universidad)

== See also ==
- 2013 Torneo Descentralizado
- 2013 Copa Perú
