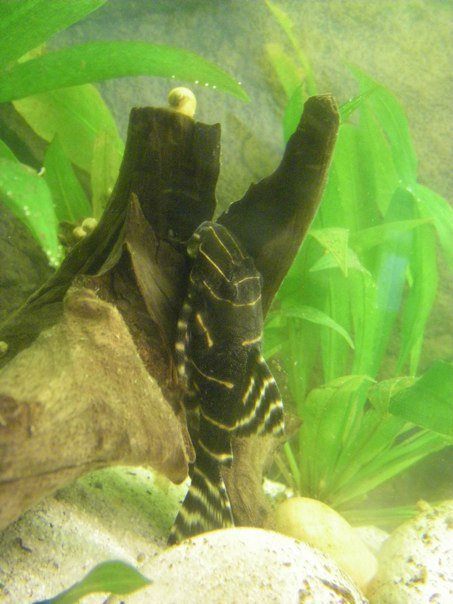

Conservation status
- Endangered (IUCN 3.1)

Scientific classification
- Kingdom: Animalia
- Phylum: Chordata
- Class: Actinopterygii
- Division: Teleostei
- Order: Siluriformes
- Family: Loricariidae
- Genus: Panaqolus
- Species: P. albivermis

Binomial name
- Panaqolus albivermis Lujan, Steele & Velasquez, 2013

= Panaqolus albivermis =

Species of catfish

Panaqolus albivermis is a species of freshwater ray-finned fish belonging to the family Loricariidae, the suckermouth armored catfishes, and the subfamily Hypostominae, the suckermouth catfishes. This catfish is endemic to Peru where it is known only from its type locality in the San Alejandro River, in the Ucayali River drainage, Padre Abad Province in the Irazola District. This species grows to a standard length of 9.6 cm (3.8 in).

While not scientifically described until 2013, this species has been known to aquarists since at least 1996. In the aquarium trade, it is typically referred to either as the flash pleco or by its L-number, L-204, which was reportedly designated in 1996. When it was formally described in 2013, the specific epithet that it was given, albivermis, roughly translates to "white worm" in Latin, referring to the distinctive pale-colored worm-like stripes, or vermiculations, sported by the species.

The International Union for Conservation of Nature have assessed this species as Endangered because it has a restricted range, occurring in a single location where it is collected in large numbers for the aquarium trade, and this has led to a population decline.
