= Walter Andrade (footballer, born 1982) =

Peruvian footballer

Personal information
- Full name: Walter William Andrade Zevallos
- Date of birth: 11 June 1982 (age 44)
- Place of birth: Peru
- Position: Defender

Senior career*
Years	Team	Apps	(Gls)
2007–2009	Alfonso Ugarte		
2010–2011	Unión Comercio		
2012	Carlos Mannucci		
2013	Walter Ormeño	13	(0)
2014	Deportivo Coopsol	7	(0)
- * Club domestic league appearances and goals

Walter William Andrade Zevallos (born 11 June 1982) is a Peruvian footballer who plays as a defender. He is currently a free agent.

== Career ==
Andrade joined Peruvian Segunda División side Alfonso Ugarte in 2007, leaving three years later to join Unión Comercio of Copa Perú. Following promotion, he made his professional debut on 13 February 2011 during a Peruvian Primera División defeat to Alianza Lima. In his next appearance, in September 2011, Andrade scored his first goal against Cienciano. In total, he scored once in five matches during the 2011 season. He joined Carlos Mannucci in 2012, before signing for Walter Ormeño a year later. 2014 saw Andrade play for Deportivo Coopsol in the Segunda División, making seven appearances as the club finished second.

== Career statistics ==
As of 2 May 2018.

Club statistics
Club	Season	League			Cup		League Cup		Continental		Other		Total	
Club	Season	Division	Apps	Goals	Apps	Goals	Apps	Goals	Apps	Goals	Apps	Goals	Apps	Goals
Walter Ormeño	2013	Segunda División	13	0	—		—		—		0	0	13	0
Deportivo Coopsol	2014	Segunda División	7	0	—		—		—		0	0	7	0
Career total			20	0	—		—		—		0	0	20	0

== Honours ==
Unión Comercio

- Copa Perú: 2010
