= Diego Brizuela =

Paraguayan footballer (born 1988)

Personal information
- Full name: Diego Armando Brizuela Jara
- Date of birth: 15 December 1988 (age 37)
- Place of birth: Canindeyu, Paraguay
- Height: 1.86 m (6 ft 1 in)
- Position: Forward

Senior career*
Years	Team	Apps	(Gls)
2008	Silvio Pettirossi	1	(0)
2009	La Emilia	2	(0)
2010–2011	3 de Febrero	0	(0)
2012	Sportivo San Lorenzo	3	(0)
2013–2014	Magallanes	20	(5)
2014–2015	Willy Serrato	12	(3)
2015	Lota Schwager	18	(2)
2015	Deportivo Santaní	1	(0)
Total		57	(10)
- * Club domestic league appearances and goals

Diego Armando Brizuela Jara (born 15 December 1988) is a Paraguayan former footballer who played as a forward.

He played for Willy Serrato of the Peruvian Segunda División.
