= César Inga =

Peruvian footballer (born 2002)

Personal information
- Full name: César Johan Inga Velásquez
- Date of birth: 30 April 2002 (age 24)
- Place of birth: Chimbote, Peru
- Height: 1.80 m (5 ft 11 in)
- Position: Left-back

Team information
- Current team: Universitario de Deportes
- Number: 33

Youth career
- 2014: Atlético Francisco Ríos
- 2015–2017: José Olaya
- 2018–2019: Sport Bunker
- 2018: Defensor Dos de Mayo
- 2019: José Gálvez
- 2019–2020: Alejandro Villanueva
- 2020–2021: Unión Juventud
- 2021–2022: Asociación Deportiva Tarma

Senior career*
Years	Team	Apps	(Gls)
2021–2024	Asociación Deportiva Tarma	78	(1)
2024–	Universitario de Deportes	52	(3)

International career^{‡}
2025–	Peru	8	(1)
- * Club domestic league appearances and goals as of 19 September 2026 ‡ National team caps and goals as of 3 October 2026

César Johan Inga Velásquez (born 30 April 2002) is a Peruvian professional footballer who plays as a left-back for the Liga 1 club Universitario and the Peru national team.

== Club career ==
Inga is a product of the youth academies of the Peruvian clubs Atlético Francisco Ríos, José Olaya, Sport Bunker, Defensor Dos de Mayo, José Gálvez, Alejandro Villanueva, and Unión Juventud. He moved to Tarma in 2021, and debuted with their senior team in the Peruvian Primera División in 2022. On 26 November 2024, he transferred to Universitario on a 3-year contract.

== International career ==
Inga debuted with the Peru national team in a 0–0 friendly tie with Colombia on 6 June 2025. He scored his first goal for Peru in a 2–1 friendly loss to Chile on 10 October 2025.

== Career statistics ==
=== Club ===
As of match played on 19 September 2026.

Season	Club	League			Cup		League Cup		Continental		Total	
Season	Club	Division	Apps	Goals	Apps	Goals	Apps	Goals	Apps	Goals	Apps	Goals
Asociación Deportiva Tarma	2022	Liga 1	24	1	–		–		–		24	1
Asociación Deportiva Tarma	2023	Liga 1	22	0	–		–		–		22	0
Asociación Deportiva Tarma	2024	Liga 1	32	0	–		–		0	0	32	0
Total			78	1	0	0	–		0	0	78	1
Universitario de Deportes	2025	Liga 1	28	1	–		–		8 (Note: Appearances in Copa Libertadores)	0	36	1
Universitario de Deportes	2026	Liga 1	24	2	–		0	0	3	0	27	2
Total			52	3	0	0	0	0	11	0	63	3
Career total			130	4	0	0	0	0	11	0	141	4

=== International ===
As of match played on 3 October 2026

Appearances and goals by national team and year
National team	Year	Apps	Goals
Peru	2025	4	1
Peru	2026	4	0
Total		8	1

Peru score listed first, score column indicates score after each Inga goal.

International goals by César Inga
No.	Date	Venue	Opponent	Score	Result	Competition
1	10 October 2025	Estadio Bicentenario de La Florida, Santiago, Chile	Chile	1–0	1–2	Friendly

== Honours ==
Asociación Deportiva Tarma

- Copa Perú: 2021

Universitario de Deportes

- Peruvian Primera División: 2025
