= Walter Andrade =

Walter Andrade may refer to:

- Walter Andrade (footballer, born 1982), Peruvian defender
- Walter Andrade (footballer, born 1984), Argentine defender
