= Defensor San Alejandro =

Peruvian football club

- Full name: Club Deportivo Defensor San Alejandro
- Nickname: La Fuerza del Cacao
- Founded: 13 September 1969
- Ground: Estadio Aliardo Soria Pérez, Pucallpa
- Capacity: 25,000
- Chairman: Manuel Gambini
- League: Copa Perú
- 2017: National Stage
| Home colours | Away colours |

Defensor San Alejandro is a Peruvian football club, playing in the city of Aguaytía, Padre Abad, Ucayali, Peru.

== History ==
In the 2011 Copa Perú, the club qualified to the Regional Stage, but was eliminated by Universidad Nacional de Ucayali in the Region III's Group B.

In the 2012 Copa Perú, the club qualified to the National Stage, but was eliminated by Alianza Cristiana in the quarterfinals. It was invited to play in the Peruvian Segunda División.

== Honours ==
=== Regional ===
- Región III: 0

Runner-up (1): 2012

- Liga Departamental de Ucayali: 1

Winners (1): 2011, 2017
Runner-up (1): 2012

- Liga Provincial de Padre Abad: 1

Winners (2): 2011, 2022
Runner-up (1): 2017

- Liga Distrital de Irazola: 1

Winners (1): 2011

== See also ==
- List of football clubs in Peru
- Peruvian football league system
