= Juventud Ticlacayán =

Peruvian football club

- Full name: Club Deportivo Juventud Ticlacayán
- Founded: March 27, 2011
- Ground: Estadio Daniel Alcides Carrión, Cerro de Pasco
- Capacity: 8,000
- League: Copa Perú
- 2013: Eliminated in Departamental Stage
Home colours

Juventud Ticlacayán is a Peruvian football club, playing in the city of Cerro de Pasco.

The club were founded 27 March 2011 and plays in the Copa Perú, which is the third division of the Peruvian league.

== History ==
In the 2011 Copa Perú, the club qualified to the Regional Stage, but was eliminated by ADT.

In the 2012 Copa Perú, the club qualified to the National Stage, but was eliminated by Defensor Zarumilla.

== Honours ==
=== National ===
- Región V: 1

Winners (1): 2012

- Liga Departamental de Pasco: 1

Winners (1): 2011
Runner-up (1): 2012

- Liga Provincial de Pasco: 1

Runner-up (1): 2011

- Liga Distrital de Cerro de Pasco: 1

Winners (1): 2011

== See also ==
- List of football clubs in Peru
- Peruvian football league system
