= Curimaná District =

Coordinates: 8.4343°S 75.1540°W

Curimaná
- District
- Interactive map of Curimaná
- Country: Peru
- Region: Ucayali
- Province: Padre Abad
- Founded: November 13, 1961
- Capital: Curimaná

Government
  - Mayor: Loiber Rocha Pinedo

Area
  - Total: 4,663.66 km^{2} (1,800.65 sq mi)
- Elevation: 287 m (942 ft)

Population (2005 census)
  - Total: 22,933
  - Density: 4.9174/km^{2} (12.736/sq mi)
- Time zone: UTC-5 (PET)
- UBIGEO: 250303
- Website: municurimana.gob.pe

Curimaná District is one of the three districts of the province Padre Abad in Peru.

== Climate ==
Climate data for El Maronal, Curimaná, elevation 178 m (584 ft), (1991–2020)
| Month | Jan | Feb | Mar | Apr | May | Jun | Jul | Aug | Sep | Oct | Nov | Dec | Year |
|---|---|---|---|---|---|---|---|---|---|---|---|---|---|
| Mean daily maximum °C (°F) | 31.9 (89.4) | 31.5 (88.7) | 31.3 (88.3) | 31.7 (89.1) | 31.4 (88.5) | 31.4 (88.5) | 31.6 (88.9) | 32.9 (91.2) | 33.3 (91.9) | 32.9 (91.2) | 32.4 (90.3) | 32.1 (89.8) | 32.0 (89.6) |
| Mean daily minimum °C (°F) | 20.8 (69.4) | 20.7 (69.3) | 20.8 (69.4) | 20.6 (69.1) | 20.0 (68.0) | 19.4 (66.9) | 19.2 (66.6) | 19.3 (66.7) | 19.6 (67.3) | 20.2 (68.4) | 20.4 (68.7) | 20.5 (68.9) | 20.1 (68.2) |
| Average precipitation mm (inches) | 240.4 (9.46) | 259.5 (10.22) | 281.4 (11.08) | 197.6 (7.78) | 129.5 (5.10) | 75.9 (2.99) | 59.1 (2.33) | 66.2 (2.61) | 118.8 (4.68) | 164.2 (6.46) | 221.6 (8.72) | 212.1 (8.35) | 2,026.3 (79.78) |
Source: National Meteorology and Hydrology Service of Peru

Climate data for Las Palmeras de Ucayali, Curimaná, elevation 170 m (560 ft), (1991–2020)
| Month | Jan | Feb | Mar | Apr | May | Jun | Jul | Aug | Sep | Oct | Nov | Dec | Year |
|---|---|---|---|---|---|---|---|---|---|---|---|---|---|
| Mean daily maximum °C (°F) | 31.6 (88.9) | 31.1 (88.0) | 31.0 (87.8) | 31.3 (88.3) | 30.6 (87.1) | 30.4 (86.7) | 31.0 (87.8) | 32.8 (91.0) | 33.3 (91.9) | 32.8 (91.0) | 32.3 (90.1) | 31.8 (89.2) | 31.7 (89.0) |
| Mean daily minimum °C (°F) | 22.0 (71.6) | 22.2 (72.0) | 22.2 (72.0) | 21.7 (71.1) | 20.9 (69.6) | 19.8 (67.6) | 19.0 (66.2) | 19.4 (66.9) | 20.4 (68.7) | 21.6 (70.9) | 22.0 (71.6) | 22.2 (72.0) | 21.1 (70.0) |
| Average precipitation mm (inches) | 247.8 (9.76) | 254.4 (10.02) | 255.1 (10.04) | 211.3 (8.32) | 153.3 (6.04) | 82.8 (3.26) | 61.1 (2.41) | 59.7 (2.35) | 119.4 (4.70) | 178.2 (7.02) | 212.4 (8.36) | 240.1 (9.45) | 2,075.6 (81.73) |
Source: National Meteorology and Hydrology Service of Peru
