= Padre Abad District =

Coordinates: 8°43′59″S 75°31′48″W

Padre Abad District Distrito de Padere Abad
- District
- Interactive map of Padre Abad District
- Country: Peru
- Region: Ucayali
- Province: Padre Abad
- Founded: January 5, 1995
- Capital: Aguaytía

Government
  - Mayor: Ivan Ronald Mendoza Jaramillo

Area
  - Total: 2,151.86 km^{2} (830.84 sq mi)
- Elevation: 150 m (490 ft)

Population (2005 census)
  - Total: 5,185
  - Density: 2.410/km^{2} (6.241/sq mi)
- Time zone: UTC-5 (PET)
- UBIGEO: 250301

Padre Abad District is one of the three districts of the province Padre Abad in Peru.

== History ==
The district was created by Law No. 13723 of November 13, 1961 with its capital the town of Aguaytía, in the second government of President Manuel Prado Ugarteche.

== Geography ==
It has an area of 2,151.86 square kilometers.In this district of the Peruvian Amazon, the Pano ethnic group Cacataibo group, self-proclaimed uni, lives.

== Population ==
According to the 2007 census, the district has a population of 5,185 inhabitants.

== Authorities ==
=== Municipal ===
- 2019 - 2022
  - Alcalde: Román Tenazoa Secas, de Todos Somos Ucayali.
  - Regidores:
  1. Daniel Osiel Zegarra Macuyama (Todos Somos Ucayali)
  2. Nirma Alegría Torres (Todos Somos Ucayali)
  3. Grimaldo Odilón Lastra Campos (Todos Somos Ucayali)
  4. Luis Delin Cabrera Ramírez (Todos Somos Ucayali)
  5. Nely Martín Carmen (Todos Somos Ucayali)
  6. José Enrique Caillahua Íñigo (Todos Somos Ucayali)
  7. Elmith Flores Rojas (Alianza para el Progreso)
  8. Judith Eliana Yaringaño Balvín (Alianza para el Progreso)
  9. Luis Edgardo Tecco Fernández (Fuerza Popular)
- 2023 - 2026
  - Alcalde: Mendoza Jaramillo Ivan Ronald, de Todos Somos Ucayali.
  - Regidores:
  1. Guerrero Morales Francisca Sena
  2. Charre Rafael Leopoldo Omer
  3. Lino Esquivel Liz Sadith
  4. Noriega Gonzales Deyvi
  5. Pizango Amasifuen Lith
  6. Garzon Ramirez George Enrique
  7. Pacheco Unocure Clarisa Domenica
  8. Odicio Angulo Marcelo
  9. Torres Zavala Yony

=== Policiales ===
- Comisario

== Climate ==
Climate data for Aguaytía, Padre Abad, elevation 316 m (1,037 ft), (1991–2020)
Month	Jan	Feb	Mar	Apr	May	Jun	Jul	Aug	Sep	Oct	Nov	Dec	Year
Mean daily maximum °C (°F)	30.4 (86.7)	30.0 (86.0)	30.4 (86.7)	30.8 (87.4)	30.3 (86.5)	30.2 (86.4)	30.5 (86.9)	31.9 (89.4)	32.3 (90.1)	31.7 (89.1)	31.2 (88.2)	30.6 (87.1)	30.9 (87.5)
Mean daily minimum °C (°F)	22.1 (71.8)	22.0 (71.6)	22.0 (71.6)	21.9 (71.4)	21.7 (71.1)	21.1 (70.0)	20.7 (69.3)	21.1 (70.0)	21.5 (70.7)	22.0 (71.6)	22.2 (72.0)	22.1 (71.8)	21.7 (71.1)
Average precipitation mm (inches)	577.6 (22.74)	623.0 (24.53)	504.1 (19.85)	351.1 (13.82)	335.7 (13.22)	233.9 (9.21)	181.4 (7.14)	124.7 (4.91)	174.4 (6.87)	343.5 (13.52)	501.1 (19.73)	608.4 (23.95)	4,558.9 (179.49)
Source: National Meteorology and Hydrology Service of Peru
