= Serrato Pacasmayo =

Peruvian football club

- Full name: Club Deportivo Serrato Pacasmayo
- Founded: February 9, 2012; 14 years ago
- Dissolved: 2018; 8 years ago
- Ground: Estadio Carlos A. Olivares
- Capacity: 2,000
- Manager: Carlos Galván
- League: Copa Perú
- 2018: Peruvian Segunda División, 15th (Relegated)
- Website: http://clubwillyserrato.blogspot.com/
Home colours	Away colours	Third colours

Club Deportivo Serrato Pacasmayo, commonly known as Club Willy Serrato, is a Peruvian football club based in Pacasmayo, La Libertad.

== History ==
Club Deportivo Social y Cultural Willy Serrato Puse was founded in 2012 after a group of businessmen from the Pimentel, Lambayeque region bought Club Corporación Espinoza's place in the local district League. The club was named after Willy Serrato Puse, a prominent politician. In the 2012 Copa Perú, it was eliminated in the Regional Stage. In the 2013 Copa Perú, the club qualified to the National Stage, but was eliminated by Unión Huaral of Huaral, Lima in the semifinals. Because of its good performance in the Copa Perú, it was invited to play in the Peruvian Segunda División when the league was expanded to 16 teams.

In its first year in the Segunda División the team finished fifth in a pretty decent campaign. For 2015, the team was obtained by Jean Acevedo Cerna, who was already the owner of the Copa Perú side Sport Chavelines Juniors. The team changed its traditional colours, moved to Pacasmayo, La Libertad and became a clone of Chavelines Juniors in everything but name. It once again reached the fifth place in the overall table for the year. For 2016, Jean Acevedo Cerna unfused Willy Serrato who then reacquired its old colours but did not move back to Pimentel. It lost the season's first match by walkover to Sport Victoria but was able to compete in the rest of the tournament which much uncertainty. The club finished 13th, only four points away from relegation.

In an effort to distance themselves from the politician Willy Serrato and to gain more popularity with its new home location, the club changed its name to Serrato Pacasmayo on social media in the last months of 2016 and officially in 2017 before the start of the season.

== Colours and badge ==
Since its foundation, Willy Serrato's colors and badge were very similar to those of the English clubs Manchester City F.C., to the point of including the Premier League and UEFA Champions League badges on the left and right shirt sleeves respectively during the 2013 season. In 2015, the club changed its colours to match those of Sport Chavelines Juniors, who was its owner. For 2016, Willy Serrato used its traditional blue colors but adopted a new badge that represented its new locality. The current badge displays the Pacasmayo Lighthouse which has a black and white checker pattern inside two circles with the words "Willy Serrato P." on top and "Pacasmayo" on bottom between the circles. For 2017 the badge was modified again after the club changed its name. The new badge now reads "*SERRATO**PACASMAYO*" and "2017" on a white background. A blue motto of the words "Valle Jequetepeque Perú" was added at the bottom of the badge.

== Stadium ==
Willy Serrato currently plays its home matches at Estadio Carlos A. Olivares in Pacasmayo, La Libertad, which has a capacity of 2,000 spectators.

== Supporters ==
The club has many local supporters within the districts of Olmos and Pimentel. One of the biggest organized groups is the Banda D' Willy.

== Honours ==
=== Regional ===
- Región I: 1

Runner-up (1): 2013

- Liga Departamental de Lambayeque: 1

Runner-up (2): 2012, 2013,

- Liga Provincial de Chiclayo: 1

Winners (1): 2012
Runner-up (1): 2013

- Liga Superior de Lambayeque: 1

Winners (1): 2013

- Liga Distrital de Pimentel: 1

Winners (1): 2012
