= Estadio Oscar Ramos Cabieses =

Municipal stadium in Lima, Peru

Estadio Oscar Ramos Cabieses is a municipal stadium in Lima, Peru opened in 1970. The stadium holds 5,000 people. In the 1970s it was used by Walter Ormeño as its home venue. The stadium is owned by the Municipalidad of Imperial.
