= Unión Juventud =

Peruvian football club

- Full name: Club Social Deportivo Unión Juventud
- Nickname(s): Unionistas, Los Verdelimón
- Founded: August 22, 1956
- Ground: Estadio Manuel Rivera Sánchez, Chimbote
- Capacity: 25,000
- Chairman: Guillermo Robles Falla
- Coach: Favio Campana
- League: Copa Perú
- 2021: Eliminated in the Interregional Phase
Home colours	Away colours

Unión Juventud is a Peruvian football club, playing in the city of Chimbote, Peru.

== History ==
The club was founded on 1956 and currently plays in the Copa Perú, which is the third division of the Peruvian football system.

In 2012 Copa Perú, the club qualified to the Regional Stage, but was eliminated by Cruzeiro Porcón and Juventud Bellavista

== Honours ==
=== Regional ===
- Liga Departamental de Ancash:

Winners (2): 1991, 2012

- Liga Provincial de Santa:

Winners (2): 2012, 2022
Runner-up (1): 2004

- Liga Distrital de Chimbote:

Winners (10): 1978, 1990, 1993, 1998, 2005, 2006, 2012, 2015, 2022, 2023
Runner-up (4): 1970, 2004, 2019, 2024

- Segunda Distrital de Chimbote:

Winners (1): 1966

== See also ==
- List of football clubs in Peru
- Peruvian football league system
