= 2012 Ligas Departamentales del Peru =

Ligas Departamentales del Peru
- Season: 2012

The 2012 Ligas Departamentales, the fifth division of Peruvian football (soccer), was played by a variable number of teams by Departament.

== Liga Departamental de Amazonas ==
=== First stage ===
| Teams | | | Scores | | |
| 1st leg home team | Points | 2nd leg home team | 1st leg | 2nd leg | Pen. |
|---|---|---|---|---|---|
| Defensor Nieva | 0:6 | Muni Ba | 2–4 | 2–12 | – |
| Grupo Malca | 4:1 | Santa Rosa (Utcubamba) | 1–0 | 1–1 | – |
| Defensor Santa Isabel | 6:0 | Unión Comercial | 2–0 | 3–0 | – |
| Cultural de Bongará | 3:3 | San Juan de Luya | 4–1 | 0–2 | – |
| Coechán de Luya | 0:6 | San Antonio (Chontapampa) | 2–3 | 0–2 | – |
| Higos Urco | 1:4 | Deportivo Municipal (RdM) | 1–1 | 2–3 | – |
| Unión Omia | 4:1 | Sachapuyos | 2–0 | 2–2 | – |

=== Second stage ===
==== Group A ====
| Pos | Team | Pld | W | D | L | GF | GA | GD | Pts |
|---|---|---|---|---|---|---|---|---|---|
| 1 | Grupo Malca | 4 | 2 | 0 | 2 | 7 | 6 | +1 | 6 |
| 2 | Muni Ba | 4 | 2 | 0 | 2 | 8 | 8 | 0 | 6 |
| 3 | Defensor Santa Isabel | 4 | 2 | 0 | 2 | 8 | 9 | −1 | 6 |

==== Group B ====
| Pos | Team | Pld | W | D | L | GF | GA | GD | Pts |
|---|---|---|---|---|---|---|---|---|---|
| 1 | Deportivo Municipal (RdM) | 6 | 3 | 3 | 0 | 7 | 3 | +4 | 12 |
| 2 | Unión Omia | 6 | 3 | 2 | 1 | 7 | 6 | +1 | 11 |
| 3 | San Antonio (Chontapampa) | 5 | 1 | 2 | 2 | 5 | 5 | 0 | 5 |
| 4 | Cultural de Bongará | 5 | 0 | 1 | 4 | 4 | 9 | −5 | 1 |

=== Final ===
| Teams | | | Scores | | |
| 1st leg home team | Points | 2nd leg home team | 1st leg | 2nd leg | Pen. |
|---|---|---|---|---|---|
| Grupo Malca | 0:3 | Deportivo Municipal (RdM) | 0–1 | – | – |

== Liga Departamental de Ancash ==
=== First stage ===
| Teams | | | Scores | | |
| 1st leg home team | Points | 2nd leg home team | 1st leg | 2nd leg | Pen. |
|---|---|---|---|---|---|
| Sport Rosario | 0:3 | Huaraz FC | 0–2 | – | – |
| Los Ángeles (San Miguel Aco) | 2:2 | San Cristóbal de Shupluy | 2–2 | 1–1 | – |
| Santa Rosa (Huallanca) | 1:4 | Huracán de Toma | 1–1 | 1–5 | – |
| Juventud América (Ranrahirca) | 4:1 | Alianza Santa Cruz | 4–1 | 2–2 | – |
| Santa Rosa (Cátac) | 3:3 | Barrio de Buenos Aires | 2–0 | 0–1 | – |
| Sport Juvenil Sipza | 0:6 | Juventud Líderes | 1–4 | 0–4 | – |
| Santo Domingo (Compinas) | 3:3 | Los Ángeles de Ocros | 6–1 | 1–2 | – |
| Real Conchucos | 0:3 | Santa Rosa (Aquia) | 0–3 | 0–0 | – |
| José Olaya (CFF) | 4:1 | San Miguel (Mariscal Luzuriaga) | 5–1 | 1–1 | – |
| La Libertad (Pomabamba) | 3:3 | San Miguel (Asunción) | 1–4 | 2–0 | – |
| Universidad San Pedro | 4:1 | Juventud Culebreña | 4–0 | 1–1 | – |
| Unión Juventud | 3:0 | Sport Huayumaca | 3–0 | – | – |
| Independiente 3 de Octubre | 3:3 | DELUSA | 1–0 | 0–1 | 2–4 |
| Santo Domingo (Huarmey) | 6:0 | Unión Juventud Quillo | 2–0 | 2–0 | – |
| Unidos por la Amistad | 0:6 | Primavera de Sihuas | 1–3 | 1–7 | – |
| Lucerito de Sihuas | 6:0 | Los Huauyas | 11–1 | 3–0 | – |

=== Second stage ===
| Teams | | | Scores | | |
| 1st leg home team | Points | 2nd leg home team | 1st leg | 2nd leg | Pen. |
|---|---|---|---|---|---|
| San Cristóbal de Shupluy | 4:1 | Huaraz FC | 2–2 | 5–2 | – |
| Juventud América (Ranrahirca) | 0:6 | Huracán de Toma | 0–4 | 1–2 | – |
| Santa Rosa (Cátac) | 3:3 | Juventud Líderes | 1–0 | 0–4 | – |
| Santo Domingo (Compinas) | 1:4 | Santa Rosa (Aquia) | 1–1 | 0–1 | – |
| José Olaya (CFF) | 0:6 | San Miguel (Asunción) | 1–2 | 2–4 | – |
| Lucerito de Sihuas | 1:4 | Primavera de Sihuas | 1–1 | 1–2 | – |
| Unión Juventud | 6:0 | DELUSA | 1–0 | 1–0 | – |
| Universidad San Pedro | 3:3 | Santo Domingo (Huarmey) | 0–1 | 3–1 | – |

=== Quarterfinals ===
| Teams | | | Scores | | |
| 1st leg home team | Points | 2nd leg home team | 1st leg | 2nd leg | Pen. |
|---|---|---|---|---|---|
| San Cristóbal de Shupluy | 2:2 | Huracán de Toma | 1–1 | 1–1 | 2–3 |
| Santa Rosa (Aquia) | 4:1 | Juventud Líderes | 2–2 | 2–1 | – |
| Primavera de Sihuas | 3:3 | San Miguel (Asunción) | 1–0 | 1–4 | – |
| Unión Juventud | 6:0 | Universidad San Pedro | 2–0 | 3–1 | – |

=== Semifinals ===
| Teams | | | Scores | | |
| 1st leg home team | Points | 2nd leg home team | 1st leg | 2nd leg | Pen. |
|---|---|---|---|---|---|
| Santa Rosa de Aquia | 3:3 | Huracán de Toma | 1–0 | 0–3 | – |
| Unión Juventud | 6:0 | San Miguel de Asunción | 7–0 | 4–0 | – |

== Liga Departamental de Apurímac ==
=== First stage ===
| Teams | | | Scores | | |
| 1st leg home team | Points | 2nd leg home team | 1st leg | 2nd leg | Pen. |
|---|---|---|---|---|---|
| Apurímac | 6:0 | Cultural Challhuahuacho | 2–0 | 1–0 | – |
| Alianza Coyllor | 6:0 | CLAS Tamburco | 2–1 | 3–1 | – |
| DECH | 4:1 | Deportivo Municipal (Curpahuasi) | 1–0 | 1–1 | – |
| Siempre Chankas | 4:1 | IST Vilcabamba | 3–0 | 0–0 | – |
| Nuevo Progreso (Aymaraes) | 0:6 | José María Arguedas | 0–2 | 0–5 | – |
| Los Andes Pachahui | 3:3 | Cultural Santa Rosa | 1–0 | 0–4 | – |

=== Second stage ===
| Teams | | | Scores | | |
| 1st leg home team | Points | 2nd leg home team | 1st leg | 2nd leg | Pen. |
|---|---|---|---|---|---|
| Apurímac | 6:0 | Siempre Chankas | 1–0 | 4–1 | – |
| Alianza Coyllor | 3:3 | Cultural Santa Rosa | 2–1 | 0–2 | – |
| DECH | 1:4 | José María Arguedas | 0–1 | 0–0 | – |

=== Final stage ===
| Pos | Team | Pld | W | D | L | GF | GA | GD | Pts |
|---|---|---|---|---|---|---|---|---|---|
| 1 | Apurímac | 4 | 2 | 2 | 0 | 4 | 1 | +3 | 8 |
| 2 | José María Arguedas | 4 | 1 | 2 | 1 | 6 | 5 | +1 | 5 |
| 3 | Cultural Santa Rosa | 4 | 1 | 0 | 3 | 4 | 8 | −4 | 3 |

== Liga Departamental de Arequipa ==
=== First stage ===
| Teams | | | Scores | | | |
| 1st leg home team | Points | 2nd leg home team | 1st leg | 2nd leg | Extra leg | Pen. |
|---|---|---|---|---|---|---|
| Aurora | 4:1 | Internacional | 1–0 | 0–0 | – | – |
| Defensor Quillunsa | w/o | Juvenil Arequipa | w/o | – | – | – |
| Juvenil Yanaquihua | 3:6 | Defensor Quebrada Brava | 2–1 | 1–2 | 1–4 | – |
| Social Camaná | 6:3 | Unión Marítimo Chorrillos | 3–1 | 2–3 | 2–1 | – |
| Los Chinitos | 1:4 | José Granda | 0–0 | 0–2 | – | – |
| Pulpera | 1:4 | Alianza Metalúrgica | 0–0 | 0–2 | – | – |
| Juventud América Yaso | 0:6 | Sportivo Cariocos | 1–4 | 2–3 | – | – |
| Sport Arenal | 0:6 | Defensor El Carmen | 1–2 | 1–5 | – | – |
| Saetas de Oro | 3:6 | Atlético Mollendo | 2–1 | 0–2 | 2–3 | – |

=== Second stage ===
| Pos | Team | Pld | W | D | L | GF | GA | GD | Pts |
|---|---|---|---|---|---|---|---|---|---|
| 1 | Alianza Metalúrgica | 2 | 2 | 0 | 0 | 4 | 2 | +2 | 6 |
| 2 | Defensor Quebrada Brava | 2 | 1 | 0 | 1 | 6 | 3 | +3 | 3 |
| 3 | Defensor Quillunsa | 2 | 0 | 0 | 2 | 2 | 7 | −5 | 0 |

| Teams | | | Scores | | | |
| 1st leg home team | Points | 2nd leg home team | 1st leg | 2nd leg | Extra match | Pen. |
|---|---|---|---|---|---|---|
| Aurora | 4:1 | Defensor El Carmen | 1–1 | 2–0 | – | – |
| Social Camaná | 1:4 | José Granda | 0–0 | 0–1 | – | – |
| Atlético Mollendo | 6:3 | Sportivo Cariocos | 2–0 | 0–2 | 2–0 | – |

=== Final stage ===
| Pos | Team | Pld | W | D | L | GF | GA | GD | Pts |
|---|---|---|---|---|---|---|---|---|---|
| 1 | José Granda | 6 | 4 | 1 | 1 | 9 | 4 | +5 | 13 |
| 2 | Aurora | 6 | 4 | 0 | 2 | 17 | 4 | +13 | 12 |
| 3 | Atlético Mollendo | 6 | 3 | 1 | 2 | 5 | 6 | −1 | 10 |
| 4 | Alianza Metalúrgica | 6 | 0 | 0 | 6 | 2 | 19 | −17 | 0 |

== Liga Departamental de Ayacucho ==
=== First stage ===
| Teams | | | Scores | | |
| 1st leg home team | Points | 2nd leg home team | 1st leg | 2nd leg | Pen. |
|---|---|---|---|---|---|
| Deportivo Municipal (Santillana) | 6:0 | Defensor Coris | 5–1 | 3–0 | – |
| Deportivo Municipal (San Miguel) | 2:2 | Percy Berrocal | 3–3 | 2–2 | – |
| Sport Municipal Arwimayo | 2:2 | Deportivo Municipal (Pichari) | 0–0 | 1–1 | – |
| San José (Lucanamarca) | 4:1 | Los Leones | 1–1 | 3–0 | – |
| Deportivo Municipal (Chilcas) | 3:3 | Deportivo Municipal (Sivia) | 2–3 | 3–1 | – |
| Sport Libertad | 6:0 | Deportivo Municipal (Querobamba) | 3–0 | 3–0 | – |
| Sport Landeo | 1:4 | Juventud Gloria–CACFMA | 0–3 | 2–2 | – |
| Deportivo Municipal (Huancapi) | 6:0 | Sport Huracán | 2–1 | 3–1 | – |
| Real Curaspampa Morochucos | 1:4 | IST San Juan | 0–1 | 0–0 | – |
| Salud Centro Ayacucho–UESCA | 6:0 | Centro de Salud Huancapi | 3–1 | 3–0 | – |
| Defensor Santa Rosa | 0:6 | Deportivo Municipal (Ayahuanco) | 0–2 | 0–1 | – |

=== Second stage ===
| Teams | | | Scores | | |
| 1st leg home team | Points | 2nd leg home team | 1st leg | 2nd leg | Pen. |
|---|---|---|---|---|---|
| Deportivo Municipal (Santillana) | 4:1 | Deportivo Municipal (San Miguel) | 0–0 | 5–1 | – |
| Deportivo Municipal (Ayahuanco) | 3:3 | Percy Berrocal | 0–2 | 2–0 | 3–2 |
| San José (Huarcaya) | 2:2 | Deportivo Municipal (Pichari) | 1–1 | 2–2 | – |
| Deportivo Municipal (Chilcas) | 0:6 | Sport Libertad | 0–3 | 0–1 | – |
| Deportivo Municipal (Huancapi) | 0:6 | Juventud Gloria–CACFMA | 0–8 | 1–4 | – |
| Salud Centro Ayacucho–UESCA | 4:1 | IST San Juan | 1–1 | 2–1 | – |

=== Third stage ===
| Teams | | | Scores | | |
| 1st leg home team | Points | 2nd leg home team | 1st leg | 2nd leg | Pen. |
|---|---|---|---|---|---|
| Deportivo Municipal (Santillana) | 1:4 | Deportivo Municipal (Pichari) | 0–0 | 1–2 | – |
| Deportivo Municipal (Ayahuanco) | 2:2 | Salud Centro Ayacucho–UESCA | 2–2 | 3–3 | – |
| Juventud Gloria–CACFMA | 3:3 | Sport Libertad | 1–2 | 5–3 | – |

=== Semifinals ===
| Teams | | | Scores | | |
| 1st leg home team | Points | 2nd leg home team | 1st leg | 2nd leg | Pen. |
|---|---|---|---|---|---|
| Juventud Gloria–CACFMA | 0:6 | Deportivo Municipal (Pichari) | 1–2 | 0–1 | – |
| Deportivo Municipal (Ayahuanco) | 1:4 | Sport Libertad | 0–1 | 0–0 | – |

=== Final ===
| Teams | | | Scores | | |
| 1st leg home team | Points | 2nd leg home team | 1st leg | 2nd leg | Pen. |
|---|---|---|---|---|---|
| Sport Libertad | 3:0 | Deportivo Municipal (Pichari) | 1–0 | – | – |

== Liga Departamental de Cajamarca ==
=== First stage ===
| Teams | | | Scores | | |
| 1st leg home team | Points | 2nd leg home team | 1st leg | 2nd leg | Pen. |
|---|---|---|---|---|---|
| Sevilla de Celendín | 3:3 | Juvenil UTC | 6–0 | 1–5 | – |
| Cruzeiro Porcón | 3:3 | San Cayetano | 5–0 | 0–5 | 1–3 |
| Defensor Chuquibamba | 1:4 | Instituto Superior | 1–1 | 1–2 | – |
| Once Leones El Cedro | 0:6 | Santa Ana | 0–5 | 1–9 | – |
| Peña Blanca de San Pablo | 0:6 | San Juan de San Miguel | 0–1 | 2–9 | – |
| Sánchez Carrión de Contumazá | 4:1 | San Juan de San Pablo | 3–0 | 1–1 | – |
| Túpac Amaru (Chota) | 1:4 | 28 de Julio (Hualgayoc) | 0–2 | 1–1 | – |
| Cultural Volante | 0:6 | Alianza Cutervo | 0–2 | 0–5 | – |
| Carniche | 4:1 | La Paquilla | 5–1 | 1–1 | – |
| Defensor Cruceño | 1:4 | Sport Agropecuario | 2–2 | 0–5 | – |
| ABX Corona | 3:3 | Comerciantes Unidos | 2–1 | 0–1 | – |
| Unión Huarango | 0:6 | Bellavista | 1–2 | 0–4 | – |
| ADA | 1:4 | Deportivo Municipal (San Ignacio) | 2–2 | 0–2 | – |

=== Second stage ===
| Teams | | | Scores | | |
| 1st leg home team | Points | 2nd leg home team | 1st leg | 2nd leg | Pen. |
|---|---|---|---|---|---|
| Sevilla de Celendín | 3:3 | Santa Ana | 2–0 | 2–6 | – |
| San Juan de San Miguel | 3:3 | San Cayetano | 1–3 | 3–2 | – |
| Cruzeiro Porcón | 3:3 | Instituto Superior | 7–0 | 2–4 | – |
| Sánchez Carrión de Contumazá | 0:6 | Sport Agropecuario | 1–2 | 1–4 | – |
| Carniche | 3:3 | 28 de Julio (Hualgayoc) | 0–2 | 3–0 | – |
| Comerciantes Unidos | 0:6 | Alianza Cutervo | 2–3 | 0–1 | – |
| Deportivo Municipal (San Ignacio) | 3:3 | Bellavista | 2–1 | 3–5 | – |

=== Quarterfinals ===
| Teams | | | Scores | | |
| 1st leg home team | Points | 2nd leg home team | 1st leg | 2nd leg | Pen. |
|---|---|---|---|---|---|
| Carniche | 3:3 | Santa Ana | 1–4 | 3–2 | – |
| Alianza Cutervo | 6:0 | San Cayetano | 2–1 | 5–0 | – |
| Cruzeiro Porcón | 4:1 | San Juan de San Miguel | 0–0 | 6–1 | – |
| Bellavista | 3:3 | Sport Agropecuario | 5–0 | 2–4 | – |

=== Semifinals ===
| Teams | | | Scores | | |
| 1st leg home team | Points | 2nd leg home team | 1st leg | 2nd leg | Pen. |
|---|---|---|---|---|---|
| Alianza Cutervo | 6:0 | Santa Ana | 2–1 | 7–0 | – |
| Cruzeiro Porcón | 3:3 | Bellavista | 0–1 | 3–0 | – |

== Liga Departamental del Callao ==
=== First stage ===
==== Group A ====
| Pos | Team | Pld | W | D | L | GF | GA | GD | Pts |
|---|---|---|---|---|---|---|---|---|---|
| 1 | José López Pazos | 3 | 2 | 1 | 0 | 7 | 2 | +5 | 7 |
| 2 | Estrella Azul | 3 | 1 | 2 | 0 | 4 | 4 | 0 | 5 |
| 3 | Veterinaria FC | 3 | 0 | 2 | 1 | 4 | 5 | −1 | 2 |
| 4 | Camiña | 3 | 0 | 1 | 2 | 4 | 10 | −6 | 1 |

==== Group B ====
| Pos | Team | Pld | W | D | L | GF | GA | GD | Pts |
|---|---|---|---|---|---|---|---|---|---|
| 1 | Márquez | 3 | 2 | 1 | 0 | 6 | 0 | +6 | 7 |
| 2 | Defensor Todos Unidos | 3 | 1 | 2 | 0 | 4 | 1 | +3 | 5 |
| 3 | Atlético Chalaco | 3 | 1 | 1 | 1 | 3 | 5 | −2 | 4 |
| 4 | Dynamo Callao | 3 | 0 | 0 | 3 | 1 | 8 | −7 | 0 |

==== Group C ====
| Pos | Team | Pld | W | D | L | GF | GA | GD | Pts |
|---|---|---|---|---|---|---|---|---|---|
| 1 | Pascual Farfán | 2 | 1 | 0 | 1 | 4 | 3 | +1 | 3 |
| 2 | América Latina | 2 | 1 | 0 | 1 | 3 | 3 | 0 | 3 |
| 3 | Deportivo SIMA | 2 | 1 | 0 | 1 | 3 | 4 | −1 | 3 |

==== Tiebreaker ====
| Teams | | | Scores | | |
| 1st leg home team | Points | 2nd leg home team | 1st leg | 2nd leg | Pen. |
|---|---|---|---|---|---|
| América Latina | 3:0 | Deportivo SIMA | 3–0 | – | – |

=== Second stage ===
| Teams | | | Scores | | |
| 1st leg home team | Points | 2nd leg home team | 1st leg | 2nd leg | Pen. |
|---|---|---|---|---|---|
| América Latina | 3:0 | Defensor Todos Unidos | 1–0 | – | – |
| José López Pazos | 1:1 | Márquez | 0–0 | 2–2 | 3–4 |

=== Semifinals ===
| Teams | | | Scores | | |
| 1st leg home team | Points | 2nd leg home team | 1st leg | 2nd leg | Pen. |
|---|---|---|---|---|---|
| América Latina | 0:3 | Juventud La Perla | 2–3 | – | – |
| Márquez | 3:0 | José Gálvez | 1–1 | – | – |

== Liga Departamental de Cusco ==
=== First stage ===
==== Group A ====
| Pos | Team | Pld | W | D | L | GF | GA | GD | Pts |
|---|---|---|---|---|---|---|---|---|---|
| 1 | Deportivo Municipal (Coporaque) | 6 | 4 | 1 | 1 | 13 | 6 | +7 | 13 |
| 2 | Deportivo Garcilaso | 6 | 3 | 1 | 2 | 21 | 7 | +14 | 10 |
| 3 | Colegio Mixto Santo Tomás | 6 | 3 | 1 | 2 | 9 | 12 | −3 | 10 |
| 4 | Estudiantes Acomayo | 6 | 0 | 1 | 5 | 3 | 21 | −18 | 1 |

==== Group B ====
| Pos | Team | Pld | W | D | L | GF | GA | GD | Pts |
|---|---|---|---|---|---|---|---|---|---|
| 1 | Manco II | 6 | 6 | 0 | 0 | 21 | 4 | +17 | 18 |
| 2 | Deportivo Municipal (Machu Picchu) | 6 | 3 | 0 | 3 | 7 | 16 | −9 | 9 |
| 3 | Estudiantes Písac | 6 | 2 | 0 | 4 | 8 | 11 | −3 | 6 |
| 4 | Sportivo Huancarani | 6 | 1 | 0 | 5 | 5 | 10 | −5 | 3 |

==== Group C ====
| Pos | Team | Pld | W | D | L | GF | GA | GD | Pts |
|---|---|---|---|---|---|---|---|---|---|
| 1 | Deportivo Municipal (Sicuani) | 6 | 4 | 1 | 1 | 13 | 5 | +8 | 13 |
| 2 | Estudiantes Unidos | 6 | 2 | 2 | 2 | 12 | 11 | +1 | 8 |
| 3 | Luis Vallejo Santoni | 5 | 2 | 2 | 1 | 5 | 6 | −1 | 8 |
| 4 | Cevat (Yaurisque) | 5 | 0 | 1 | 4 | 5 | 13 | −8 | 1 |

==== Group D ====
| Pos | Team | Pld | W | D | L | GF | GA | GD | Pts |
|---|---|---|---|---|---|---|---|---|---|
| 1 | Humberto Luna | 4 | 4 | 0 | 0 | 9 | 2 | +7 | 12 |
| 2 | Defensor Pampamarca | 4 | 2 | 0 | 2 | 10 | 8 | +2 | 6 |
| 3 | Social Patria | 4 | 0 | 0 | 4 | 6 | 15 | −9 | 0 |

==== Group E ====
| Pos | Team | Pld | W | D | L | GF | GA | GD | Pts |
|---|---|---|---|---|---|---|---|---|---|
| 1 | Deportivo Municipal (Combapata) | 6 | 3 | 1 | 2 | 12 | 8 | +4 | 10 |
| 2 | Real Atlético Echarate | 6 | 3 | 1 | 2 | 11 | 7 | +4 | 10 |
| 3 | Cultural Anansaya | 6 | 2 | 0 | 4 | 6 | 12 | −6 | 6 |
| 4 | Defensor Limatambo | 6 | 2 | 2 | 2 | 8 | 10 | −2 | 8 |

==== Group F ====
| Pos | Team | Pld | W | D | L | GF | GA | GD | Pts |
|---|---|---|---|---|---|---|---|---|---|
| 1 | Sport Tinke | 6 | 4 | 0 | 2 | 7 | 4 | +3 | 12 |
| 2 | Estudiantes Agropecuario | 6 | 4 | 0 | 2 | 10 | 5 | +5 | 12 |
| 3 | Cienciano Junior | 6 | 2 | 1 | 3 | 5 | 6 | −1 | 7 |
| 4 | Olímpicos (Maska) | 6 | 1 | 0 | 5 | 6 | 13 | −7 | 3 |

==== Group G ====
| Pos | Team | Pld | W | D | L | GF | GA | GD | Pts |
|---|---|---|---|---|---|---|---|---|---|
| 1 | Virgen del Carmen | 6 | 4 | 1 | 1 | 11 | 5 | +6 | 13 |
| 2 | Deportivo Municipal (Espinar) | 6 | 4 | 0 | 2 | 14 | 5 | +9 | 12 |
| 3 | Yawarmayo | 6 | 3 | 1 | 2 | 11 | 9 | +2 | 10 |
| 4 | Don Bosco | 6 | 0 | 0 | 6 | 3 | 20 | −17 | 0 |

=== Quarterfinals ===
| Teams | | | Scores | | |
| 1st leg home team | Points | 2nd leg home team | 1st leg | 2nd leg | Pen. |
|---|---|---|---|---|---|
| Estudiantes Agropecuario | 3:3 | Deportivo Municipal (Combapata) | 5–1 | 2–3 | – |
| Manco II | 4:1 | Deportivo Municipal (Coporaque) | 1–1 | 3–0 | – |
| Deportivo Municipal (Sicuani) | 1:4 | Humberto Luna | 1–2 | 2–2 | – |
| Virgen del Carmen | 3:3 | Deportivo Municipal (Espinar) | 3–1 | 1–4 | – |

=== Semifinals ===
| Teams | | | Scores | | |
| 1st leg home team | Points | 2nd leg home team | 1st leg | 2nd leg | Pen. |
|---|---|---|---|---|---|
| Estudiantes Agropecuario | 4:1 | Deportivo Municipal (Espinar) | 2–2 | 4–1 | – |
| Manco II | 3:3 | Humberto Luna | 3–1 | 0–1 | – |

=== Final ===
| Teams | | | Scores | | |
| 1st leg home team | Points | 2nd leg home team | 1st leg | 2nd leg | Pen. |
|---|---|---|---|---|---|
| Estudiantes Agropecuario | 3:3 | Manco II | 0–4 | 3–1 | – |

== Liga Departamental de Huancavelica ==
=== First stage ===
| Teams | | | Scores | | |
| 1st leg home team | Points | 2nd leg home team | 1st leg | 2nd leg | Pen. |
|---|---|---|---|---|---|
| Cultural Cahuide | 0:6 | Deportivo Municipal (Yauli) | 0–8 | 0–1 | – |
| UDA | 6:0 | Alianza Lircay | 1–0 | 4–0 | – |
| Hidros de Tucsipampa | 3:3 | Defensor Cchoclococha | 1–2 | 1–0 | – |
| Racing (Cocas) | 0:6 | Unión Minas (Ccochaccasa) | 0–3 | 0–3 | – |
| Deportivo Municipal (Paucará) | 4:1 | Santo Domingo (Huaytará) | 2–2 | 6–4 | – |
| Leones de Huamancancha | 2:2 | Defensor Chacoya | 1–1 | 1–1 | – |

=== Second stage ===
==== Group A ====
| Pos | Team | Pld | W | D | L | GF | GA | GD | Pts |
|---|---|---|---|---|---|---|---|---|---|
| 1 | UDA | 6 | 5 | 0 | 1 | 17 | 1 | +16 | 15 |
| 2 | Deportivo Municipal (Yauli) | 6 | 5 | 0 | 1 | 14 | 1 | +13 | 15 |
| 3 | Hidros de Tucsipampa | 6 | 1 | 1 | 4 | 1 | 11 | −10 | 4 |
| 4 | Defensor Cchoclococha | 6 | 0 | 1 | 5 | 0 | 19 | −19 | 1 |

==== Group B ====
| Pos | Team | Pld | W | D | L | GF | GA | GD | Pts |
|---|---|---|---|---|---|---|---|---|---|
| 1 | Deportivo Municipal (Paucará) | 3 | 3 | 0 | 0 | 11 | 2 | +9 | 9 |
| 2 | Unión Minas (Ccochaccasa) | 3 | 2 | 0 | 1 | 9 | 4 | +5 | 6 |
| 3 | Santo Domingo (Huaytará) | 2 | 0 | 0 | 2 | 2 | 8 | −6 | 0 |
| 4 | Leones de Huamancancha | 2 | 0 | 0 | 2 | 1 | 9 | −8 | 0 |

=== Semifinals ===
| Teams | | | Scores | | | |
| 1st leg home team | Points | 2nd leg home team | 1st leg | 2nd leg | Extra leg | Pen. |
|---|---|---|---|---|---|---|
| Deportivo Municipal (Paucará) | 3:6 | Deportivo Municipal (Yauli) | 0–3 | 3–0 | 2–5 | – |
| UDA | 4:1 | Unión Minas (Ccochaccasa) | 1–1 | 2–0 | – | – |

=== Final ===
| Teams | | | Scores | | |
| 1st leg home team | Points | 2nd leg home team | 1st leg | 2nd leg | Pen. |
|---|---|---|---|---|---|
| UDA | 0:3 | Deportivo Municipal (Yauli) | 1–2 | – | – |

== Liga Departamental de Huánuco ==
=== First stage ===
| Teams | | | Scores | | |
| 1st leg home team | Points | 2nd leg home team | 1st leg | 2nd leg | Pen. |
|---|---|---|---|---|---|
| Unión Tingo María | 0:6 | Social Molino | 1–4 | 0–2 | – |
| Deportivo Porvenir | 0:6 | Unión Castillo Grande | 1–3 | 1–4 | – |
| Deportivo Guantánamo | 3:3 | Tambillo Grande | 1–1 | 1–1 | 1–4 |
| Deportivo Manchuria | 6:0 | Deportivo Honolulú | 2–1 | 3–2 | – |
| San Miguel (Huaycabamba) | 3:3 | Alejandro Villanueva (Dos de Mayo) | 1–0 | 1–3 | – |
| Alianza Cruzpampa | w/o | Deportivo Integración | w/o | – | – |
| Sport Zona Cero | 4:1 | Defensor Ambo | 2–0 | 1–1 | – |
| Señor de Compadres | 1:4 | UNHEVAL | 0–0 | 1–3 | – |
| San Marcos (Pachitea) | 0:6 | León de Collana | 0–1 | 0–1 | – |

=== Second stage ===
| Teams | | | Scores | | |
| 1st leg home team | Points | 2nd leg home team | 1st leg | 2nd leg | Pen. |
|---|---|---|---|---|---|
| UNHEVAL | 4:1 | Social Molino | 2–2 | 2–1 | – |
| Sport Zona Cero | 1:4 | Unión Castillo Grande | 1–1 | 1–2 | – |
| Deportivo Manchuria | 4:1 | Tambillo Grande | 1–0 | 0–0 | – |
| León de Collana | 0:6 | Alejandro Villanueva (Dos de Mayo) | 0–1 | 1–2 | – |
| Alianza Cruzpampa | 3:3 | Señor de Compadres | 0–1 | 3–0 | – |

=== Third stage ===
==== Group A ====
| Teams | | | Scores | | |
| 1st leg home team | Points | 2nd leg home team | 1st leg | 2nd leg | Pen. |
|---|---|---|---|---|---|
| UNHEVAL | 4:1 | León de Collana | 0–0 | 2–0 | – |
| UNHEVAL | 4:1 | Alianza Cruzpampa | 0–0 | 4–0 | – |

==== Group B ====
| Teams | | | Scores | | |
| 1st leg home team | Points | 2nd leg home team | 1st leg | 2nd leg | Pen. |
|---|---|---|---|---|---|
| Unión Castillo Grande | 4:1 | Deportivo Manchuria | 0–0 | 1–0 | – |

==== Final ====
| Teams | | | Scores | | |
| 1st leg home team | Points | 2nd leg home team | 1st leg | 2nd leg | Pen. |
|---|---|---|---|---|---|
| Unión Castillo Grande | 3:3 | UNHEVAL | 2–1 | 0–2 | – |

== Liga Departamental de Ica ==
=== First stage ===
| Teams | | | Scores | | |
| 1st leg home team | Points | 2nd leg home team | 1st leg | 2nd leg | Pen. |
|---|---|---|---|---|---|
| Juventud Balconcito | 3:3 | Octavio Espinosa | 1–0 | 0–2 | – |
| Alianza Pisco | 4:1 | América de Palpa | 2–0 | 0–0 | – |
| Santos | 6:0 | Joe Gutiérrez | 3–1 | 1–0 | – |
| Deportivo Municipal (Palpa) | 1:4 | Casalla Junior | 0–1 | 0–0 | – |
| Manuel Carrillo | 0:6 | Mayta Cápac | 0–1 | 0–3 | – |
| Deportivo Puquio | 6:0 | Defensor Mayta Cápac | 1–0 | 2–0 | – |
| Barcelona (Parcona) | 4:1 | ISP Filiberto García | 6–3 | 2–2 | – |

=== Second stage ===
| Teams | | | Scores | | |
| 1st leg home team | Points | 2nd leg home team | 1st leg | 2nd leg | Pen. |
|---|---|---|---|---|---|
| Barcelona (Parcona) | 3:3 | Octavio Espinosa | 0–1 | 2–1 | – |
| Alianza Pisco | 4:1 | Casalla Junior | 2–1 | 0–0 | – |
| Santos | 6:0 | Deportivo Puquio | 4–0 | 3–1 | – |
| Juventud Balconcillo | 1:4 | Mayta Cápac | 0–0 | 0–1 | – |

=== Semifinals ===
| Teams | | | Scores | | |
| 1st leg home team | Points | 2nd leg home team | 1st leg | 2nd leg | Pen. |
|---|---|---|---|---|---|
| Barcelona (Parcona) | 1:4 | Santos | 1–2 | 2–2 | – |
| Alianza Pisco | 0:6 | Mayta Cápac | 1–2 | 1–2 | – |

=== Final ===
| Teams | | | Scores | | |
| 1st leg home team | Points | 2nd leg home team | 1st leg | 2nd leg | Pen. |
|---|---|---|---|---|---|
| Mayta Cápac | 1:1 | Santos | 2–2 | – | 3–4 |

== Liga Departamental de Junín ==
=== First stage ===
| Teams | | | Scores | | |
| 1st leg home team | Points | 2nd leg home team | 1st leg | 2nd leg | Pen. |
|---|---|---|---|---|---|
| Deportivo Municipal (Mazamari) | 4:1 | Deportivo Municipal (Morococha) | 0–0 | 3–0 | – |
| Alipio Ponce | 6:0 | Unión Perené | 1–0 | 3–1 | – |
| Academia Municipal de Pichanaki | 6:0 | Deportivo Municipal (Pangoa) | 3–0 | 4–0 | – |
| Deportivo Municipal Asociados | 3:3 | Túpac Amaru (La Oroya) | 1–0 | 0–1 | – |
| Deportivo Municipal (La Oroya) | 4:1 | Esperanza Huertas | 1–0 | 0–0 | – |
| Santa Rosa (Huancayo) | 6:0 | Asociación Deportiva Tejahuay | 5–0 | 2–0 | – |
| San Cristóbal de Junín | 0:6 | Santa Rosa PNP | 0–1 | 0–2 | – |
| Echa Muni | 4:1 | Defensor Maravilca | 2–2 | 1–0 | – |
| Deportivo Municipal (Yanamuclo) | 2:2 | Unión Juventud (Tayacaja) | 3–3 | 1–1 | – |
| Poderoso Papa Palias | 1:4 | Sao Paulo Vicentino | 0–1 | 2–2 | – |
| Cultural Vicentina | 3:3 | Lolo Fernández (Ahuac) | 3–0 | 1–2 | – |

=== Group stage ===
==== Group A ====
| Pos | Team | Pld | W | D | L | GF | GA | GD | Pts |
|---|---|---|---|---|---|---|---|---|---|
| 1 | Deportivo Municipal Asociados | 6 | 4 | 1 | 1 | 12 | 7 | +5 | 13 |
| 2 | Alipio Ponce | 6 | 4 | 0 | 2 | 15 | 8 | +7 | 12 |
| 3 | Santa Rosa (Huancayo) | 6 | 1 | 2 | 3 | 10 | 16 | −6 | 5 |
| 4 | Sao Paulo Vicentino | 6 | 1 | 1 | 4 | 11 | 17 | −6 | 4 |

==== Group B ====
| Pos | Team | Pld | W | D | L | GF | GA | GD | Pts |
|---|---|---|---|---|---|---|---|---|---|
| 1 | Academia Municipal de Pichanaki | 6 | 4 | 0 | 2 | 15 | 8 | +7 | 12 |
| 2 | Echa Muni | 6 | 3 | 2 | 1 | 13 | 9 | +4 | 11 |
| 3 | Deportivo Municipal (La Oroya) | 6 | 3 | 2 | 1 | 15 | 12 | +3 | 11 |
| 4 | Lolo Fernández (Ahuac) | 6 | 0 | 0 | 6 | 5 | 17 | −12 | 0 |

==== Group C ====
| Pos | Team | Pld | W | D | L | GF | GA | GD | Pts |
|---|---|---|---|---|---|---|---|---|---|
| 1 | Deportivo Municipal (Mazamari) | 6 | 3 | 3 | 0 | 12 | 5 | +7 | 12 |
| 2 | Santa Rosa PNP | 6 | 3 | 2 | 1 | 11 | 7 | +4 | 11 |
| 3 | Túpac Amaru (La Oroya) | 6 | 2 | 1 | 3 | 9 | 14 | −5 | 7 |
| 4 | Cultural Vicentina | 6 | 0 | 2 | 4 | 7 | 13 | −6 | 2 |

=== Final stage ===
| Pos | Team | Pld | W | D | L | GF | GA | GD | Pts |
|---|---|---|---|---|---|---|---|---|---|
| 1 | Alipio Ponce | 3 | 3 | 0 | 0 | 9 | 2 | +7 | 9 |
| 2 | Deportivo Municipal (Mazamari) | 3 | 2 | 0 | 1 | 4 | 3 | +1 | 6 |
| 3 | Academia Municipal de Pichanaki | 3 | 1 | 0 | 2 | 1 | 4 | −3 | 3 |
| 4 | Deportivo Municipal Asociados | 3 | 0 | 0 | 3 | 1 | 6 | −5 | 0 |

== Liga Departamental de La Libertad ==
=== First stage ===
==== Group A ====
| Pos | Team | Pld | W | D | L | GF | GA | GD | Pts |
|---|---|---|---|---|---|---|---|---|---|
| 1 | Carlos A. Mannucci | 4 | 4 | 0 | 0 | 15 | 1 | +14 | 12 |
| 2 | El Inca | 4 | 1 | 1 | 2 | 5 | 12 | −7 | 4 |
| 3 | Juventud Moderna | 4 | 0 | 1 | 3 | 3 | 10 | −7 | 1 |

==== Group B ====
| Pos | Team | Pld | W | D | L | GF | GA | GD | Pts |
|---|---|---|---|---|---|---|---|---|---|
| 1 | Juventud Bellavista | 3 | 3 | 0 | 0 | 15 | 3 | +12 | 9 |
| 2 | Alianza Guadalupe | 3 | 2 | 0 | 1 | 6 | 7 | −1 | 6 |
| 3 | Sport Municipal | 4 | 0 | 0 | 4 | 3 | 14 | −11 | 0 |

==== Group C ====
| Pos | Team | Pld | W | D | L | GF | GA | GD | Pts |
|---|---|---|---|---|---|---|---|---|---|
| 1 | Universitario UPAO | 3 | 2 | 1 | 0 | 9 | 1 | +8 | 7 |
| 2 | Transporte San Ildefonso | 4 | 2 | 1 | 1 | 9 | 4 | +5 | 7 |
| 3 | Unión Virú | 3 | 0 | 0 | 3 | 3 | 16 | −13 | 0 |

==== Group D ====
| Pos | Team | Pld | W | D | L | GF | GA | GD | Pts |
|---|---|---|---|---|---|---|---|---|---|
| 1 | Sporting Tabacco (Ascope) | 5 | 4 | 0 | 1 | 20 | 5 | +15 | 12 |
| 2 | Tigres del Centenario | 5 | 3 | 1 | 1 | 12 | 8 | +4 | 10 |
| 3 | Unión Juvenil | 5 | 2 | 1 | 2 | 9 | 8 | +1 | 7 |
| 4 | Gómez Azcarate | 5 | 0 | 0 | 5 | 4 | 24 | −20 | 0 |

==== Group E ====
| Pos | Team | Pld | W | D | L | GF | GA | GD | Pts |
|---|---|---|---|---|---|---|---|---|---|
| 1 | Deportivo Marsa | 4 | 3 | 0 | 1 | 9 | 2 | +7 | 9 |
| 2 | Defensor Torino | 4 | 2 | 1 | 1 | 7 | 3 | +4 | 7 |
| 3 | Deportivo Municipal (Santiago de Chuco) | 4 | 1 | 1 | 2 | 2 | 5 | −3 | 4 |
| 4 | Defensor Ermita | 4 | 0 | 2 | 2 | 0 | 8 | −8 | 2 |

==== Group F ====
| Pos | Team | Pld | W | D | L | GF | GA | GD | Pts |
|---|---|---|---|---|---|---|---|---|---|
| 1 | Racing | 4 | 4 | 0 | 0 | 17 | 2 | +15 | 12 |
| 2 | Ciclón Santiaguino | 4 | 2 | 1 | 1 | 5 | 8 | −3 | 7 |
| 3 | Deportivo Municipal (Pataz) | 4 | 0 | 2 | 2 | 2 | 5 | −3 | 2 |
| 4 | Unión Cruz Blanca | 4 | 0 | 1 | 3 | 3 | 12 | −9 | 1 |

=== Quarterfinals ===
| Teams | | | Scores | | |
| 1st leg home team | Points | 2nd leg home team | 1st leg | 2nd leg | Pen. |
|---|---|---|---|---|---|
| Universitario UPAO | 1:4 | Carlos A. Mannucci | 2–2 | 0–2 | – |
| Sporting Tabaco (Ascope) | 0:6 | Juventud Bellavista | 0–3 | 2–4 | – |
| Racing | 4:1 | Deportivo Municipal (Santiago de Chuco) | 2–1 | 2–2 | – |
| Deportivo Marsa | 3:3 | Ciclón Santiaguino | 3–1 | 0–1 | – |

=== Semifinals ===
| Teams | | | Scores | | |
| 1st leg home team | Points | 2nd leg home team | 1st leg | 2nd leg | Pen. |
|---|---|---|---|---|---|
| Juventud Bellavista | 4:1 | Ciclón Santiaguino | 0–0 | 12–0 | – |
| Racing | 0:6 | Carlos A. Mannucci | 0–1 | 0–1 | – |

== Liga Departamental de Lambayeque ==
=== First stage ===
==== Group A ====
| Pos | Team | Pld | W | D | L | GF | GA | GD | Pts |
|---|---|---|---|---|---|---|---|---|---|
| 1 | Willy Serrato | 2 | 1 | 1 | 0 | 5 | 0 | +5 | 4 |
| 2 | Universidad Señor de Sipán | 2 | 1 | 1 | 0 | 1 | 0 | +1 | 4 |
| 3 | KDT Nacional (Ferreñafe) | 2 | 0 | 0 | 2 | 0 | 6 | −6 | 0 |

==== Group B ====
| Pos | Team | Pld | W | D | L | GF | GA | GD | Pts |
|---|---|---|---|---|---|---|---|---|---|
| 1 | Cruz de Chalpón | 2 | 2 | 0 | 0 | 6 | 4 | +2 | 6 |
| 2 | Construcción Civil | 2 | 1 | 0 | 1 | 4 | 3 | +1 | 3 |
| 3 | Flamengo (Leonardo Ortiz) | 2 | 0 | 0 | 2 | 2 | 5 | −3 | 0 |

==== Group C ====
| Pos | Team | Pld | W | D | L | GF | GA | GD | Pts |
|---|---|---|---|---|---|---|---|---|---|
| 1 | Deportivo Pomalca | 2 | 1 | 1 | 0 | 3 | 1 | +2 | 4 |
| 2 | Chacarita Juniors (Lambayeque) | 2 | 1 | 0 | 1 | 4 | 3 | +1 | 3 |
| 3 | Juventud Melgar | 2 | 0 | 1 | 1 | 0 | 3 | −3 | 1 |

=== Semifinals ===
| Teams | | | Scores | | |
| 1st leg home team | Points | 2nd leg home team | 1st leg | 2nd leg | Pen. |
|---|---|---|---|---|---|
| Cruz de Chalpón | 0:6 | Willy Serrato | 0–1 | 0–2 | – |
| Deportivo Pomalca | 3:3 | Universidad Señor de Sipán | 1–2 | 1–0 | – |

=== Final ===
| Teams | | | Scores | | |
| 1st leg home team | Points | 2nd leg home team | 1st leg | 2nd leg | Pen. |
|---|---|---|---|---|---|
| Deportivo Pomalca | 1:1 | Willy Serrato | 0–0 | – | 3–1 |

== Liga Departamental de Lima ==
=== First stage ===
| Teams | | | Scores | | |
| 1st leg home team | Points | 2nd leg home team | 1st leg | 2nd leg | Pen. |
|---|---|---|---|---|---|
| DIM | 4:1 | Unión Minas (Uchucchacua) | 4–1 | 1–1 | – |
| Santa Rosa La Quincha | 3:3 | Unión Huaral | 2–1 | 0–2 | – |
| San Lorenzo de Porococha | 3:3 | River Plate (Canchacalla) | 4–0 | 1–3 | – |
| Estudiantes Condestable | 4:1 | Juventud Santa Ana | 3–2 | 1–1 | – |
| Ciclista Lima FC | 4:1 | Venus | 1–0 | 1–1 | – |
| Defensor San Nicolás | 3:3 | Deportivo Municipal | 0–1 | 1–0 | 1–4 |
| Los Tilos | 4:1 | Social Municipal | 1–0 | 1–1 | – |
| Amauta de Huarochirí | 0:6 | Walter Ormeño | 0–6 | 0–10 | – |
| Unión Galpón | 2:2 | Juventud Barranco | 1–1 | 2–2 | – |
| Nicolás de Piérola | 1:4 | Huracán de Canta | 0–1 | 1–1 | – |

=== Second stage ===
| Teams | | | Scores | | |
| 1st leg home team | Points | 2nd leg home team | 1st leg | 2nd leg | Pen. |
|---|---|---|---|---|---|
| Estudiantes Condestable | 4:1 | DIM | 0–0 | 2–1 | – |
| Santa Rosa La Quincha | 1:4 | Deportivo Municipal | 0–3 | 1–1 | – |
| San Lorenzo de Porococha | 0:6 | Unión Huaral | 0–1 | 0–1 | – |
| Unión Galpón | 3:3 | Juventud Santa Ana | 4–2 | 0–2 | – |
| Ciclista Lima FC | 6:0 | Defensor San Nicolás | 1–0 | 5–1 | – |
| Los Tilos | 1:4 | River Plate (Canchacalla) | 0–2 | 1–1 | – |
| Juventud Barranco | 3:3 | Walter Ormeño | 0–4 | 3–1 | – |
| Venus | 6:0 | Huracán de Canta | 1–0 | 3–1 | – |

=== Quarterfinals ===
| Teams | | | Scores | | |
| 1st leg home team | Points | 2nd leg home team | 1st leg | 2nd leg | Pen. |
|---|---|---|---|---|---|
| Estudiantes Condestable | 1:4 | Unión Huaral | 1–2 | 1–1 | – |
| Ciclista Lima FC | 1:4 | Deportivo Municipal | 1–1 | 0–1 | – |
| Unión Galpón | 4:1 | Venus | 1–0 | 1–1 | – |
| Walter Ormeño | 4:1 | River Plate (Canchacalla) | 1–1 | 1–0 | – |

=== Semifinals ===
| Teams | | | Scores | | |
| 1st leg home team | Points | 2nd leg home team | 1st leg | 2nd leg | Pen. |
|---|---|---|---|---|---|
| Deportivo Municipal | 6:0 | Unión Huaral | 3–0 | 3–1 | – |
| Unión Galpón | 0:6 | Walter Ormeño | 0–1 | 0–1 | – |

=== Final ===
| Teams | | | Scores | | |
| 1st leg home team | Points | 2nd leg home team | 1st leg | 2nd leg | Pen. |
|---|---|---|---|---|---|
| Deportivo Municipal | 3:0 | Walter Ormeño | 3–0 | – | – |

== Liga Departamental de Loreto ==
=== First stage ===
==== Group A ====
| Pos | Team | Pld | W | D | L | GF | GA | GD | Pts |
|---|---|---|---|---|---|---|---|---|---|
| 1 | Deportivo Municipal (Nauta) | 2 | 0 | 2 | 0 | 2 | 2 | 0 | 2 |
| 2 | Sport Roaboya | 1 | 0 | 1 | 0 | 1 | 1 | 0 | 1 |
| 3 | Pachacútec (Requena) | 1 | 0 | 1 | 0 | 1 | 1 | 0 | 1 |

==== Group B ====
| Pos | Team | Pld | W | D | L | GF | GA | GD | Pts |
|---|---|---|---|---|---|---|---|---|---|
| 1 | UNAP | 3 | 2 | 1 | 0 | 18 | 2 | +16 | 7 |
| 2 | Zaragoza (Loreto) | 3 | 2 | 1 | 0 | 12 | 1 | +11 | 7 |
| 3 | Alfonso Ugarte (Ucayali) | 3 | 1 | 0 | 2 | 4 | 17 | −13 | 3 |
| 4 | Hospital Mayor | 3 | 0 | 0 | 3 | 3 | 17 | −14 | 0 |

==== Group C ====
| Pos | Team | Pld | W | D | L | GF | GA | GD | Pts |
|---|---|---|---|---|---|---|---|---|---|
| 1 | Dínamo (Datem del Marañón) | 2 | 2 | 0 | 0 | 7 | 2 | +5 | 6 |
| 2 | Defensor Lomas | 2 | 1 | 0 | 1 | 9 | 5 | +4 | 3 |
| 3 | Manaos de Requena | 2 | 1 | 0 | 1 | 4 | 3 | +1 | 3 |
| 4 | Sport Islandia | 2 | 0 | 0 | 2 | 3 | 13 | −10 | 0 |

==== Group D ====
| Pos | Team | Pld | W | D | L | GF | GA | GD | Pts |
|---|---|---|---|---|---|---|---|---|---|
| 1 | Alianza Cristiana | 2 | 1 | 1 | 0 | 2 | 1 | +1 | 4 |
| 2 | Francisco Secada | 2 | 1 | 1 | 0 | 1 | 0 | +1 | 4 |
| 3 | Deportivo Hospital (Amazonas) | 2 | 0 | 0 | 2 | 1 | 3 | −2 | 0 |

===== Extra matches =====
| Teams | | | Scores | | |
| 1st leg home team | Points | 2nd leg home team | 1st leg | 2nd leg | Pen. |
|---|---|---|---|---|---|
| Deportivo Municipal (Nauta) | 3:0 | Pachacútec (Requena) | 1–0 | – | – |
| UNAP | 3:0 | Zaragoza (Loreto) | 12–0 | – | – |
| Alianza Cristiana | 3:0 | Francisco Secada | 2–1 | – | – |

=== Final stage ===
| Pos | Team | Pld | W | D | L | GF | GA | GD | Pts |
|---|---|---|---|---|---|---|---|---|---|
| 1 | Alianza Cristiana | 3 | 3 | 0 | 0 | 16 | 4 | +12 | 9 |
| 2 | UNAP | 3 | 2 | 0 | 1 | 9 | 7 | +2 | 6 |
| 3 | Deportivo Municipal (Nauta) | 2 | 0 | 0 | 2 | 5 | 8 | −3 | 0 |
| 4 | Dínamo (Datem del Marañón) | 2 | 0 | 0 | 2 | 3 | 14 | −11 | 0 |

== Liga Departamental de Madre de Dios ==
=== First stage ===
| Teams | | | Scores | | |
| 1st leg home team | Points | 2nd leg home team | 1st leg | 2nd leg | Pen. |
|---|---|---|---|---|---|
| Deportivo Maldonado | 4:1 | Deportivo Monterrico | 1–1 | 3–0 | – |
| JM de Huepetuhe | 3:3 | Olímpico Tambopata | 1–2 | 2–0 | 4–3 |
| 12 de Enero (Manu) | 0:6 | Fray Martín de Porres | 3–5 | 0–4 | – |

=== Second stage ===
| Pos | Team | Pld | W | D | L | GF | GA | GD | Pts |
|---|---|---|---|---|---|---|---|---|---|
| 1 | MINSA | 6 | 4 | 2 | 0 | 16 | 7 | +9 | 14 |
| 2 | Deportivo Maldonado | 6 | 2 | 2 | 2 | 7 | 7 | 0 | 8 |
| 3 | Fray Martín de Porres | 6 | 1 | 4 | 1 | 10 | 10 | 0 | 7 |
| 4 | Olímpico Tambopata | 6 | 0 | 2 | 4 | 5 | 14 | −9 | 2 |

== Liga Departamental de Moquegua ==
=== First stage ===
| Pos | Team | Pld | W | D | L | GF | GA | GD | Pts |
|---|---|---|---|---|---|---|---|---|---|
| 1 | Social EPISA | 6 | 4 | 1 | 1 | 13 | 4 | +9 | 13 |
| 2 | José Gálvez de Ilo | 6 | 4 | 1 | 1 | 17 | 7 | +10 | 13 |
| 3 | Juventus Ilo | 5 | 2 | 2 | 1 | 13 | 7 | +6 | 8 |
| 4 | Vallecito | 6 | 2 | 0 | 4 | 10 | 21 | −11 | 6 |
| 5 | San Simón | 6 | 1 | 2 | 3 | 5 | 8 | −3 | 5 |
| 6 | Atlético Huracán | 5 | 0 | 2 | 3 | 3 | 11 | −8 | 2 |

=== Final ===
| Teams | | | Scores | | |
| 1st leg home team | Points | 2nd leg home team | 1st leg | 2nd leg | Pen. |
|---|---|---|---|---|---|
| Social EPISA | 1:1 | José Gálvez de Ilo | 1–1 | – | 2–1 |

=== Second Place ===
| Teams | | | Scores | | |
| 1st leg home team | Points | 2nd leg home team | 1st leg | 2nd leg | Pen. |
|---|---|---|---|---|---|
| AEXA Santa Cruz | 6:0 | José Gálvez de Ilo | 3–2 | 1–0 | – |

== Liga Departamental de Pasco ==
=== Quarterfinals ===
| Teams | | | Scores | | |
| 1st leg home team | Points | 2nd leg home team | 1st leg | 2nd leg | Pen. |
|---|---|---|---|---|---|
| Juventud Ticlacayán | 4:1 | Social Constitución | 7–0 | 0–0 | – |
| Santa Ana | 4:1 | Alipio Ponce | 0–0 | 1–0 | – |
| Zona Industrial | 4:1 | Sport Pasco | 2–0 | 1–1 | – |
| Rancas | 6:0 | Volcán de Villo | 4–0 | 3–0 | – |

=== Semifinals ===
| Teams | | | Scores | | |
| 1st leg home team | Points | 2nd leg home team | 1st leg | 2nd leg | Pen. |
|---|---|---|---|---|---|
| Juventud Ticlacayán | 4:1 | Santa Ana | 1–1 | 1–0 | – |
| Zona Industrial | 1:4 | Rancas | 1–1 | 0–1 | – |

=== Final ===
| Teams | | | Scores | | |
| 1st leg home team | Points | 2nd leg home team | 1st leg | 2nd leg | Pen. |
|---|---|---|---|---|---|
| Juventud Ticlacayán | 1:1 | Rancas | 1–1 | – | 7–8 |

== Liga Departamental de Piura ==
=== Group A ===
| Pos | Team | Pld | W | D | L | GF | GA | GD | Pts |
|---|---|---|---|---|---|---|---|---|---|
| 1 | Unión Deportivo Paita | 8 | 6 | 2 | 0 | 19 | 6 | +13 | 20 |
| 2 | Flamengo | 8 | 5 | 0 | 3 | 14 | 8 | +6 | 15 |
| 3 | Juana & Victor | 8 | 3 | 2 | 3 | 11 | 9 | +2 | 11 |
| 4 | Defensor Grau | 8 | 3 | 0 | 5 | 7 | 13 | −6 | 9 |
| 5 | Deportivo Chalaco | 8 | 1 | 0 | 7 | 7 | 22 | −15 | 3 |

=== Group B ===
| Pos | Team | Pld | W | D | L | GF | GA | GD | Pts |
|---|---|---|---|---|---|---|---|---|---|
| 1 | Juan Aurich (Morropón) | 8 | 5 | 1 | 2 | 17 | 9 | +8 | 16 |
| 2 | José Olaya (Paita) | 8 | 5 | 1 | 2 | 17 | 9 | +8 | 16 |
| 3 | Carlos Concha (Talara) | 8 | 5 | 0 | 3 | 11 | 6 | +5 | 15 |
| 4 | Deportivo Municipal (Huancabamba) | 7 | 1 | 2 | 4 | 9 | 21 | −12 | 5 |
| 5 | Inca Junior | 7 | 0 | 2 | 5 | 4 | 13 | −9 | 2 |

=== Group C ===
| Pos | Team | Pld | W | D | L | GF | GA | GD | Pts |
|---|---|---|---|---|---|---|---|---|---|
| 1 | José Olaya (Sechura) | 8 | 5 | 2 | 1 | 19 | 8 | +11 | 17 |
| 2 | Defensor La Bocana | 8 | 4 | 3 | 1 | 18 | 9 | +9 | 15 |
| 3 | Sport Bellavista | 8 | 4 | 1 | 3 | 14 | 12 | +2 | 13 |
| 4 | Las Mercedes | 8 | 3 | 2 | 3 | 17 | 12 | +5 | 11 |
| 5 | Rosario Central (Ayabaca) | 8 | 0 | 0 | 8 | 1 | 28 | −27 | 0 |

=== Group D ===
| Pos | Team | Pld | W | D | L | GF | GA | GD | Pts |
|---|---|---|---|---|---|---|---|---|---|
| 1 | Rueda Dominicana | 6 | 4 | 2 | 0 | 9 | 5 | +4 | 14 |
| 2 | Próspero Merino | 6 | 4 | 1 | 1 | 10 | 5 | +5 | 13 |
| 3 | Túpac Amaru (Sullana) | 5 | 0 | 2 | 3 | 5 | 9 | −4 | 2 |
| 4 | Independiente (Talara) | 5 | 0 | 1 | 4 | 2 | 7 | −5 | 1 |

=== Quarterfinals ===
| Teams | | | Scores | | |
| 1st leg home team | Points | 2nd leg home team | 1st leg | 2nd leg | Pen. |
|---|---|---|---|---|---|
| Próspero Merino | 1:4 | Unión Deportivo Paita | 1–2 | 3–3 | – |
| Defensor La Bocana | 4:1 | Juan Aurich (Morropón) | 2–0 | 2–2 | – |
| Flamengo | 0:6 | José Olaya (Sechura) | 2–5 | 1–6 | – |
| Rueda Dominicana | 2:2 | José Olaya (Paita) | 0–0 | 0–0 | 1–3 |

=== Semifinals ===
| Teams | | | Scores | | |
| 1st leg home team | Points | 2nd leg home team | 1st leg | 2nd leg | Pen. |
|---|---|---|---|---|---|
| José Olaya (Sechura) | 3:3 | Unión Deportivo Paita | 0–1 | 3–1 | – |
| Defensor La Bocana | 0:6 | José Olaya (Paita) | 0–3 | 0–3 | – |

=== Final ===
| Teams | | | Scores | | |
| 1st leg home team | Points | 2nd leg home team | 1st leg | 2nd leg | Pen. |
|---|---|---|---|---|---|
| José Olaya (Sechura) | 1:1 | José Olaya (Paita) | 1–1 | 3–4 | – |

== Liga Departamental de Puno ==
=== First stage ===
| Teams | | | Scores | | |
| 1st leg home team | Points | 2nd leg home team | 1st leg | 2nd leg | Pen. |
|---|---|---|---|---|---|
| Unión Victoria | 1:4 | Deportivo Municipal (San Juan del Oro) | 2–2 | 1–3 | – |
| Estudiantes Puno | 4:1 | ADESA | 1–1 | 1–0 | – |
| ADEVIL | 1:4 | Deportivo Municipal (Macusani) | 2–2 | 1–2 | – |
| Deportivo Municipal (Canchi Grande) | 6:0 | Deportivo Municipal (Ajoyani) | 3–0 | 2–1 | – |
| Juventus de Orurillo | 6:0 | Túpac Amaru (Pucara) | 3–0 | 2–1 | – |
| Real Melgar | 3:3 | Deportivo Municipal (Umachiri) | 1–0 | 1–6 | – |
| Defensor Cojata | 0:6 | Alianza Moho | 0–2 | 1–4 | – |
| Deportivo Municipal (Putina) | 4:1 | Unión Cojata | 1–0 | 1–1 | – |
| Defensor Ullagachi | 3:3 | Real Amistad | 2–1 | 0–2 | – |
| 24 de Noviembre (Pilcuyo) | 0:6 | Policial Santa Rosa | 0–2 | 0–4 | – |
| Olimpicos BTA Asociados | 0:6 | Cultural Tahuantinsuyo | 2–3 | 1–2 | – |
| Unión Desaguadero | 0:3 | Sporting Cristal (Cuturapi)] | 0–4 | – | – |

=== Second stage ===
| Teams | | | Scores | | |
| 1st leg home team | Points | 2nd leg home team | 1st leg | 2nd leg | Pen. |
|---|---|---|---|---|---|
| Estudiantes Puno | 1:4 | Deportivo Municipal (Canchi Grande) | 0–0 | 1–2 | – |
| Juventus de Orurillo | 1:4 | Deportivo Municipal (Putina) | 1–2 | 1–1 | – |
| Alianza Moho | 4:1 | Deportivo Municipal (Umachiri) | 2–2 | 3–2 | – |
| Sporting Cristal (Cuturapi) | 1:4 | Real Amistad | 2–3 | 0–0 | – |
| Cultural Tahuantinsuyo | 0:6 | Policial Santa Rosa | 1–6 | w/o | – |
| Deportivo Municipal (Macusani) | 3:3 | Deportivo Municipal (San Juan del Oro) | 4–0 | 1–2 | – |

=== Third stage ===
==== Group A ====
| Pos | Team | Pld | W | D | L | GF | GA | GD | Pts |
|---|---|---|---|---|---|---|---|---|---|
| 1 | Deportivo Municipal (Canchi Grande) | 4 | 3 | 0 | 1 | 14 | 2 | +12 | 9 |
| 2 | Deportivo Municipal (Macusani) | 4 | 3 | 0 | 1 | 10 | 4 | +6 | 9 |
| 3 | Real Amistad | 4 | 0 | 0 | 4 | 1 | 19 | −18 | 0 |

==== Extra match ====
| Teams | | | Scores | | |
| 1st leg home team | Points | 2nd leg home team | 1st leg | 2nd leg | Pen. |
|---|---|---|---|---|---|
| Deportivo Municipal (Macusani) | 1:1 | Deportivo Municipal (Canchi Grande) | 1–1 | – | 5–4 |

==== Group B ====
| Pos | Team | Pld | W | D | L | GF | GA | GD | Pts |
|---|---|---|---|---|---|---|---|---|---|
| 1 | Policial Santa Rosa | 3 | 3 | 0 | 0 | 8 | 2 | +6 | 9 |
| 2 | Deportivo Municipal (Putina) | 2 | 0 | 1 | 1 | 2 | 3 | −1 | 1 |
| 3 | Alianza Moho | 3 | 0 | 1 | 2 | 2 | 7 | −5 | 1 |

=== Final stage ===
| Pos | Team | Pld | W | D | L | GF | GA | GD | Pts |
|---|---|---|---|---|---|---|---|---|---|
| 1 | Alfonso Ugarte | 6 | 3 | 3 | 0 | 16 | 5 | +11 | 12 |
| 2 | Binacional | 6 | 3 | 2 | 1 | 10 | 9 | +1 | 11 |
| 3 | Deportivo Municipal (Macusani) | 5 | 1 | 1 | 3 | 7 | 7 | 0 | 4 |
| 4 | Policial Santa Rosa | 5 | 0 | 2 | 3 | 4 | 15 | −11 | 2 |

== Liga Departamental de San Martín ==
=== First stage ===
==== Group A ====
| Pos | Team | Pld | W | D | L | GF | GA | GD | Pts |
|---|---|---|---|---|---|---|---|---|---|
| 1 | Sport Alto Mayo | 4 | 3 | 1 | 0 | 23 | 1 | +22 | 10 |
| 2 | Deportivo Quilluallpa | 3 | 1 | 1 | 1 | 3 | 5 | −2 | 4 |
| 3 | Defensor Potrerillo | 3 | 0 | 0 | 3 | 1 | 21 | −20 | 0 |

==== Group B ====
| Pos | Team | Pld | W | D | L | GF | GA | GD | Pts |
|---|---|---|---|---|---|---|---|---|---|
| 1 | Asociación Nueva Rioja | 4 | 3 | 0 | 1 | 12 | 4 | +8 | 9 |
| 2 | Deportivo Hospital (Moyobamba) | 3 | 2 | 0 | 1 | 5 | 5 | 0 | 6 |
| 3 | San Juan de Lamas | 3 | 0 | 0 | 3 | 3 | 11 | −8 | 0 |

==== Group C ====
| Pos | Team | Pld | W | D | L | GF | GA | GD | Pts |
|---|---|---|---|---|---|---|---|---|---|
| 1 | UNSM | 4 | 2 | 2 | 0 | 11 | 4 | +7 | 8 |
| 2 | Power Maíz | 3 | 1 | 0 | 2 | 8 | 12 | −4 | 3 |
| 3 | Sporting Cacao | 3 | 0 | 2 | 1 | 5 | 8 | −3 | 2 |

==== Group D ====
| Pos | Team | Pld | W | D | L | GF | GA | GD | Pts |
|---|---|---|---|---|---|---|---|---|---|
| 1 | Santos | 3 | 3 | 0 | 0 | 10 | 3 | +7 | 9 |
| 2 | Asociación de Madereros | 3 | 1 | 0 | 2 | 7 | 8 | −1 | 3 |
| 3 | Atlético Grau (Picota) | 2 | 0 | 0 | 2 | 3 | 9 | −6 | 0 |

==== Group E ====
| Pos | Team | Pld | W | D | L | GF | GA | GD | Pts |
|---|---|---|---|---|---|---|---|---|---|
| 1 | Huallaga | 5 | 3 | 2 | 0 | 11 | 2 | +9 | 11 |
| 2 | Héctor Chumpitaz | 5 | 3 | 1 | 1 | 10 | 5 | +5 | 10 |
| 3 | Integración Magistral | 5 | 1 | 3 | 1 | 5 | 7 | −2 | 6 |
| 4 | Estudiantes Miguelinos | 5 | 0 | 0 | 5 | 2 | 14 | −12 | 0 |

==== Group F ====
| Pos | Team | Pld | W | D | L | GF | GA | GD | Pts |
|---|---|---|---|---|---|---|---|---|---|
| 1 | Defensor Huallaga | 3 | 2 | 1 | 0 | 9 | 3 | +6 | 7 |
| 2 | Rafael Ríos | 4 | 1 | 1 | 2 | 4 | 9 | −5 | 4 |
| 3 | Unión Carhuapoma | 3 | 0 | 2 | 1 | 4 | 5 | −1 | 2 |

=== Second stage ===
==== Group A ====
| Pos | Team | Pld | W | D | L | GF | GA | GD | Pts |
|---|---|---|---|---|---|---|---|---|---|
| 1 | Sport Alto Mayo | 4 | 2 | 2 | 0 | 8 | 0 | +8 | 8 |
| 2 | Universidad Nacional de San Martin | 4 | 2 | 2 | 0 | 6 | 2 | +4 | 8 |
| 3 | Defensor Huallaga | 4 | 0 | 0 | 4 | 2 | 14 | −12 | 0 |

==== Group B ====
| Pos | Team | Pld | W | D | L | GF | GA | GD | Pts |
|---|---|---|---|---|---|---|---|---|---|
| 1 | Santos | 4 | 3 | 1 | 0 | 6 | 0 | +6 | 10 |
| 2 | Huallaga | 3 | 1 | 1 | 1 | 5 | 2 | +3 | 4 |
| 3 | Asociación Nueva Rioja | 3 | 0 | 0 | 3 | 0 | 9 | −9 | 0 |

== Liga Departamental de Tacna ==
=== First stage ===
==== Group A ====
| Pos | Team | Pld | W | D | L | GF | GA | GD | Pts |
|---|---|---|---|---|---|---|---|---|---|
| 1 | Deportivo Credicoop | 4 | 3 | 1 | 0 | 14 | 0 | +14 | 10 |
| 2 | Sport Nevados | 4 | 2 | 1 | 1 | 6 | 3 | +3 | 7 |
| 3 | 15 de Julio de Candarave | 4 | 2 | 0 | 2 | 6 | 9 | −3 | 6 |
| 4 | Defensor Tarata | 4 | 0 | 1 | 3 | 3 | 8 | −5 | 1 |
| 5 | Unión Mirave | 4 | 0 | 1 | 3 | 2 | 11 | −9 | 1 |

==== Group B ====
| Pos | Team | Pld | W | D | L | GF | GA | GD | Pts |
|---|---|---|---|---|---|---|---|---|---|
| 1 | Bolognesi Zepita | 4 | 3 | 0 | 1 | 7 | 6 | +1 | 9 |
| 2 | Mariscal Miller | 4 | 2 | 1 | 1 | 17 | 6 | +11 | 7 |
| 3 | Águilas Melgar | 4 | 2 | 1 | 1 | 13 | 9 | +4 | 7 |
| 4 | Borogueña de Jorge Basadre | 4 | 2 | 0 | 2 | 10 | 12 | −2 | 6 |
| 5 | Curibaya de Candarave | 4 | 0 | 0 | 4 | 3 | 17 | −14 | 0 |

=== Semifinals ===
| Teams | | | Scores | | |
| 1st leg home team | Points | 2nd leg home team | 1st leg | 2nd leg | Pen. |
|---|---|---|---|---|---|
| Bolognesi Zepita | 3:0 | Sport Nevados | 2–0 | – | – |
| Deportivo Credicoop | 3:0 | Mariscal Miller | 3–1 | – | – |

=== Final ===
| Teams | | | Scores | | |
| 1st leg home team | Points | 2nd leg home team | 1st leg | 2nd leg | Pen. |
|---|---|---|---|---|---|
| Bolognesi Zepita | 3:0 | Deportivo Credicoop | 1–0 | – | – |

== Liga Departamental de Tumbes ==
=== Standings ===
| Pos | Team | Pld | W | D | L | GF | GA | GD | Pts |
|---|---|---|---|---|---|---|---|---|---|
| 1 | Sporting Pizarro | 10 | 9 | 1 | 0 | 33 | 10 | +23 | 28 |
| 2 | José Chiroque Cielo | 9 | 7 | 1 | 1 | 18 | 3 | +15 | 22 |
| 3 | Académicos Alfred Nobel | 9 | 6 | 2 | 1 | 24 | 9 | +15 | 20 |
| 4 | Sport Bolognesi | 9 | 4 | 2 | 3 | 18 | 11 | +7 | 14 |
| 5 | Sport Pampas | 10 | 4 | 2 | 4 | 19 | 19 | 0 | 14 |
| 6 | San Martín | 9 | 4 | 1 | 4 | 15 | 14 | +1 | 13 |
| 7 | José Peña Herrera | 9 | 3 | 1 | 5 | 18 | 23 | −5 | 10 |
| 8 | Sport Buenos Aires | 8 | 2 | 2 | 4 | 9 | 13 | −4 | 8 |
| 9 | Defensor San José | 8 | 1 | 2 | 5 | 11 | 18 | −7 | 5 |
| 10 | 24 de Julio de Zarumilla | 8 | 1 | 0 | 7 | 7 | 25 | −18 | 3 |
| 11 | Sport Bocapán | 7 | 0 | 0 | 7 | 6 | 33 | −27 | 0 |

== Liga Departamental de Ucayali ==
=== First stage ===
| Teams | | | Scores | | |
| 1st leg home team | Points | 2nd leg home team | 1st leg | 2nd leg | Pen. |
|---|---|---|---|---|---|
| Defensor Bolognesi | 4:1 | Tecnológico | 3–2 | 1–1 | – |
| Deportivo Municipal (Atalaya) | 0:6 | Mariano Santos (Coronel Portillo) | 0–3 | 0–7 | – |
| Sport Loreto | 6:0 | Fernando Carbajal | 2–1 | 3–0 | – |
| José Olaya (Padre Abad) | 0:6 | Deportivo Hospital | 0–1 | 1–4 | – |
| Atlético Pucallpa | 2:2 | Defensor San Alejandro | 1–0 | 0–1 | 3–4 |
| La Paz | 0:6 | Deportivo Municipal (Purús) | 0–2 | 2–4 | – |
| Pedro Ruiz Gallo | 0:3 | Puerto 3 de Octubre | w/o | 0–3 | – |

=== Second stage ===
| Teams | | | Scores | | |
| 1st leg home team | Points | 2nd leg home team | 1st leg | 2nd leg | Pen. |
|---|---|---|---|---|---|
| Defensor Bolognesi | 0:6 | Deportivo Hospital | 2–4 | 1–3 | – |
| Defensor San Alejandro | 4:1 | Mariano Santos (Coronel Portillo) | 1–1 | 3–1 | – |
| Sport Loreto | 3:3 | Deportivo Municipal (Purús) | 2–1 | 0–1 | – |

=== Final stage ===
| Pos | Team | Pld | W | D | L | GF | GA | GD | Pts |
|---|---|---|---|---|---|---|---|---|---|
| 1 | Deportivo Municipal (Purús) | 3 | 3 | 0 | 0 | 6 | 2 | +4 | 9 |
| 2 | Defensor San Alejandro | 3 | 2 | 0 | 1 | 7 | 4 | +3 | 6 |
| 3 | Puerto 3 de Octubre | 3 | 1 | 0 | 2 | 9 | 8 | +1 | 3 |
| 4 | Deportivo Hospital | 3 | 0 | 0 | 3 | 2 | 10 | −8 | 0 |
