= Irazola District =

Coordinates: 8°10′48″S 74°52′12″W

Irazola
- District
- Interactive map of Irazola
- Country: Peru
- Region: Ucayali
- Province: Padre Abad
- Founded: June 1, 1982
- Capital: San Alejandro

Government
  - Mayor: Manuel Gambini Rupay

Area
  - Total: 2,006.98 km^{2} (774.90 sq mi)
- Elevation: 212 m (696 ft)

Population (2005 census)
  - Total: 16,192
  - Density: 8.0678/km^{2} (20.896/sq mi)
- Time zone: UTC-5 (PET)
- UBIGEO: 250302

Irazola District is one of the three districts of the province Padre Abad in Peru.

== Climate ==
Climate data for San Alejandro, Irazola, elevation 216 m (709 ft), (1991–2020)
Month	Jan	Feb	Mar	Apr	May	Jun	Jul	Aug	Sep	Oct	Nov	Dec	Year
Mean daily maximum °C (°F)	31.4 (88.5)	30.9 (87.6)	31.1 (88.0)	31.4 (88.5)	31.0 (87.8)	30.8 (87.4)	31.4 (88.5)	32.9 (91.2)	33.3 (91.9)	32.6 (90.7)	32.0 (89.6)	31.4 (88.5)	31.7 (89.0)
Mean daily minimum °C (°F)	22.2 (72.0)	22.2 (72.0)	22.1 (71.8)	21.9 (71.4)	21.4 (70.5)	20.7 (69.3)	20.0 (68.0)	20.2 (68.4)	21.0 (69.8)	21.9 (71.4)	22.2 (72.0)	22.2 (72.0)	21.5 (70.7)
Average precipitation mm (inches)	230.1 (9.06)	274.5 (10.81)	204.8 (8.06)	163.5 (6.44)	101.5 (4.00)	73.3 (2.89)	69.0 (2.72)	61.8 (2.43)	108.5 (4.27)	164.8 (6.49)	185.2 (7.29)	236.7 (9.32)	1,873.7 (73.78)
Source: National Meteorology and Hydrology Service of Peru

== Cocoa Festival ==
Until the 1990s, the area reached levels of extreme poverty, due to the internal armed conflict in Peru, attacking several native communities in the district and leaving 1,500 settlers dedicated to the cultivation of coca.

During the mayoralty of Manuel Gambini and Yonel Mendoza a process of changing crops to cocoa was implemented.

From then on, together with the Regional government of Ucayali, the cocoa festival is held annually with activities related to the processes derived from chocolate, parades and beauty pageants.
