= Alianza Cristiana =

Peruvian football club

- Full name: Club Deportivo Alianza Cristiana
- Nickname(s): El Rey de la Selva
- Founded: 14 April 2008
- Ground: Estadio Max Augustín, Iquitos
- Capacity: 24,576
- Chairman: Robinson Arahuanasa
- League: Copa Perú
- 2013: Segunda División, 14th (relegated)
Home colours	Away colours

Alianza Cristiana is a Peruvian football club, playing in the city of Andoas, Datem del Marañón, Loreto, Peru.

== History ==
Alianza Cristiana was founded on April 14, 2008, by Robinson Arahuanasa.

In the 2012 Copa Perú, the club qualified to the National Stage, but was eliminated by Universidad Técnica de Cajamarca in the semifinals.

In the 2013 Peruvian Segunda División, the club was disabled and relegated to the Copa Perú for outstanding debts with the SAFAP.

== Honours ==
=== Regional ===
- Región III: 1

Winners (1): 2012

- Liga Departamental de Loreto: 1

Winners (1): 2012

- Liga Provincial de Datem del Marañón: 1

Winners (1): 2012

- Liga Distrital de Andoas: 1

Winners (1): 2012

== See also ==
- List of football clubs in Peru
- Peruvian football league system
