= Padre Abad province =

Padre Abad
- Province
- Coat of arms

- Location of Padre Abad in the Ucayali Region
- Coordinates: 8°50′S 75°24′W
- Country: Peru
- Region: Ucayali
- Capital: Aguaytía

Government
  - Mayor: Tony Tang Gonzales (2007)

Area
  - Total: 8,822.5 km^{2} (3,406.4 sq mi)

Population 2007 census
  - Total: 50,590
  - Density: 5.734/km^{2} (14.85/sq mi)
- UBIGEO: 2503
- Website: padreabadaguaytia.com

Padre Abad is the smallest of four provinces in the Ucayali Region, in the central Amazon rainforest of Peru.

== Languages ==
According to the 2007 census, 89.4% of the population spoke Spanish as their first language, while 6.3% spoke Quechua, 0.1% spoke Asháninka, 0.1% spoke Aymara, 3.9% spoke other indigenous languages and 0.0% spoke foreign languages.

== Political division ==
The province is divided into three districts (Spanish: distritos, singular: distrito), each of which is headed by a mayor (alcalde). The districts, with their capitals in parentheses, are:

- Curimaná (Curimaná)
- Irazola (San Alejandro)
- Padre Abad (Aguaytía)
