= Sport Victoria =

Peruvian football club

- Full name: Club Sport Victoria
- Nickname(s): El Albinegro, El Decano Iqueño
- Founded: March 14, 1916
- Dissolved: 2021
- Ground: Enrique José Picasso Peratta, Ica
- Capacity: 8,000
- Chairman: (Peru) Joel Rosales Pacheco
- Manager: (Peru) Abelho Tordoya
- League: Copa Perú
- 2019: Liga 2, 12th (relegated)
- Website: https://es-la.facebook.com/ClubSportVictoriaIca/
Home colours	Away colours

Sport Victoria is a Peruvian football club representing the city of Ica, Peru. The club was founded in 1916 and currently plays in the Peruvian Segunda División which is the second division of the Peruvian league.

== History ==
In 2006 Copa Perú, Sport Victoria qualified to the National Stage, but was eliminated by Deportivo Ingeniería in the round of 16.

In 2007 Copa Perú, Sport Victoria qualified to the National Stage, but was eliminated by Sport Águila in the round of 16.

In 2010 Copa Perú, Sport Victoria qualified to the National Stage, but was eliminated by Asociación Deportiva Tarma in the quarter-finals.

In 2011 Torneo Intermedio, the club was eliminated by Universidad San Martín de Porres in the round of 32*.

In 2011 Copa Perú, Sport Victoria qualified to the National Stage, but was eliminated by Alianza Universidad in the round of 16.

In 2012 Copa Perú, Sport Victoria qualified to the National Stage, and was invited to play in the 2013 Peruvian Segunda Division

== Honours ==
=== Regional ===
- Región V
  - Winners (1): 2006
  - Runner-up (1): 2007
- Región VI
  - Winners (2): 2010, 2012
  - Runner-up (1): 2011
- Liga Departamental de Ica
  - Winners (1): 2006
  - Runner-up (2): 2007, 2010
- Liga Distrital de Ica
  - Winners (3): 2006, 2010, 2023

== See also ==
- List of football clubs in Peru
- Peruvian football league system
