= Walter Ormeño de Cañete =

Walter Ormeño
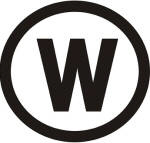
- Full name: Club Deportivo Walter Ormeño
- Nickname: Ormeñistas
- Founded: October 10, 1950
- Ground: Estadio Roberto Yañez, Cañete
- Capacity: 6,000
- League: Peruvian Segunda División
- 2013: Peruvian Segunda División, 8th
Home colours	Away colours	Third colours

Club Deportivo Walter Ormeño (sometimes referred as Walter Ormeño de Cañete) is a Peruvian football club, playing in the city of Cañete, Lima, Peru.

== History ==
The Club Deportivo Walter Ormeño was founded on October 10, 1950. It was named Club Walter Ormeño, in honor of Walter Ormeño, who was the goalkeeper from Universitario de Deportes; most of the founders were supporters of the team. The Club Deportivo Walter Ormeno originally played in the San Vicente District League in the beginning but it moved to the Imperial District League where it would see much of its early success. The team won the 1970 Lima Department League.

In 1974, The Peruvian Football Federation promoted all eight regional Copa Peru champions to the 1974 Torneo Descentralizado. That year was the first and last year in which the club participated in the highest level of Peruvian soccer league. It was relegated to a new relegation system which it eliminated the worst team in the league, the worst from the Metropolitan Lima area team, and the worst two teams from the Peruvian departments that had more than two teams in the league. This meant that Walter Ormeño, Piérola, and Juan Aurich played an extra group stage to decide who could stay in the league where the team did not succeed. Years later it was invited to play in the Peruvian Segunda Division where it was runner-up behind Hijos de Yurimaguas in 1990 only to be relegated in 1991. In 2013, after reaching the round of 16 of the 2012 Copa Peru it was invited to play the Peruvian Segunda Division once more.

== Notable players ==
- (Peru) Víctor Calatayud
- (Peru) Luis Cruzado
- (Peru) Daniel Reyes
- (Peru) Martín Rodríguez Custodio

== Statistics and results in First Division ==
=== League history ===
Season	Div.	Pos.	Pl.	W	D	L	GF	GA	P	Notes
1974	1st	17	42	10	11	21	41	65	31	17/22 Regular season

== Honours ==
=== Senior titles ===
Keys

- Record
- ^{(s)} Shared record

Type	Competition	Titles	Runner-up	Winning years	Runner-up years
National (League)	Segunda División	—	1	—	1990
Regional (League)	Región IV	2	—	1974, 2012	—
Regional (League)	Liga Departamental de Lima	1	6	1969	1966, 1968, 1970, 1973, 1976, 2012
Regional (League)	Liga Provincial de Cañete	6	1	1998, 2012, 2018, 2019, 2022, 2023	1956
Regional (League)	Liga Distrital de Imperial	29	3	1961, 1966, 1967, 1968, 1969, 1970, 1971, 1972, 1973, 1975, 1977, 1994, 1995, 1996, 1997, 1998, 1999, 2000, 2001, 2002, 2012, 2016, 2017, 2018, 2019, 2022, 2023, 2024, 2026	2007, 2008, 2025
Regional (League)	Segunda Distrital de Imperial	1	—	1955	—

== Women’s football ==
Type	Competition	Titles	Runner-up	Winning years	Runner-up years
Regional (League)	Liga Provincial de Cañete	3	—	2022, 2023, 2024	—

== See also ==
- List of football clubs in Peru
- Peruvian football league system
