= Aguaytía =

- Town
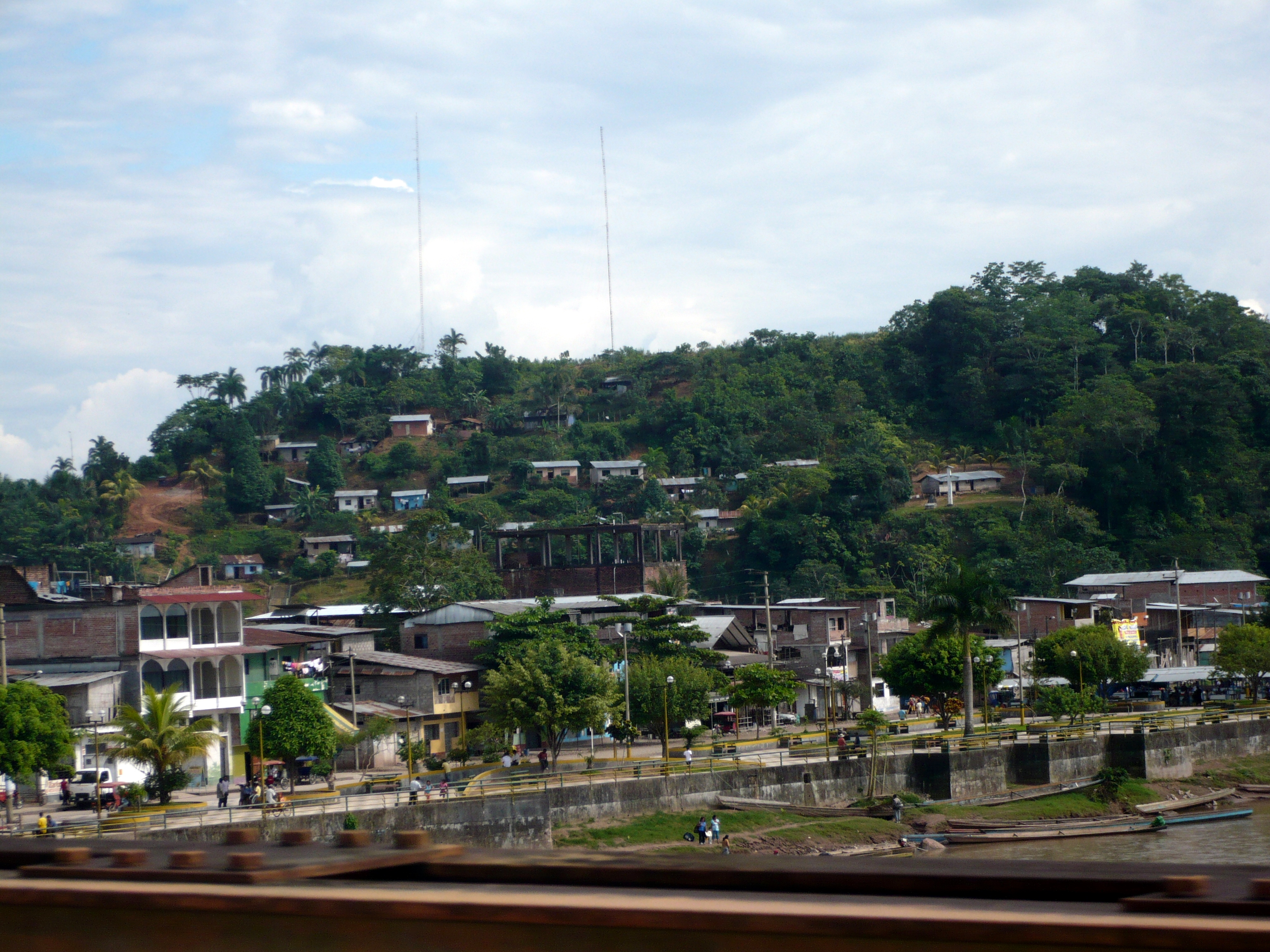

- Location within Peru
- Coordinates: 9°02′13″S 75°30′27″W
- Country: Peru
- Region: Ucayali
- Province: Padre Abad
- District: Padre Abad

Government
  - Mayor: Tony Tang Gonzales
- Elevation: 287 m (942 ft)
- Time zone: UTC-5 (PET)
- Website: www.padreabadaguaytia.com

Aguaytía is a town situated in Peru, capital of the province Padre Abad in the region Ucayali. It is situated on the banks of the Aguaytía River (a tributary of the Ucayali River) at the highway between Pucallpa and Tingo María. It is of interest to those who live in the region as a tourist destination, due to its proximity to the spectacular waterfall "El Velo de la Novia" (The Bridal Veil).

== Climate ==
Climate data for Aguaytía, Padre Abad, elevation 316 m (1,037 ft), (1991–2020)
Month	Jan	Feb	Mar	Apr	May	Jun	Jul	Aug	Sep	Oct	Nov	Dec	Year
Mean daily maximum °C (°F)	30.4 (86.7)	30.0 (86.0)	30.4 (86.7)	30.8 (87.4)	30.3 (86.5)	30.2 (86.4)	30.5 (86.9)	31.9 (89.4)	32.3 (90.1)	31.7 (89.1)	31.2 (88.2)	30.6 (87.1)	30.9 (87.5)
Mean daily minimum °C (°F)	22.1 (71.8)	22.0 (71.6)	22.0 (71.6)	21.9 (71.4)	21.7 (71.1)	21.1 (70.0)	20.7 (69.3)	21.1 (70.0)	21.5 (70.7)	22.0 (71.6)	22.2 (72.0)	22.1 (71.8)	21.7 (71.1)
Average precipitation mm (inches)	577.6 (22.74)	623.0 (24.53)	504.1 (19.85)	351.1 (13.82)	335.7 (13.22)	233.9 (9.21)	181.4 (7.14)	124.7 (4.91)	174.4 (6.87)	343.5 (13.52)	501.1 (19.73)	608.4 (23.95)	4,558.9 (179.49)
Source: National Meteorology and Hydrology Service of Peru
