= Etapa Regional (Copa Perú 1967–2014) =

- Founded: 1967
- Folded: 2014; 12 years ago
- Country: Peru
- Number of clubs: Variable
- Promotion to: National stage (Copa Perú)
- Relegation to: Ligas Departamentales

The Etapa Regional (Regional Stage) was the fourth division of the Peruvian football league system, forming part of the Copa Perú of the Peruvian Football Federation (FPF).

== History ==
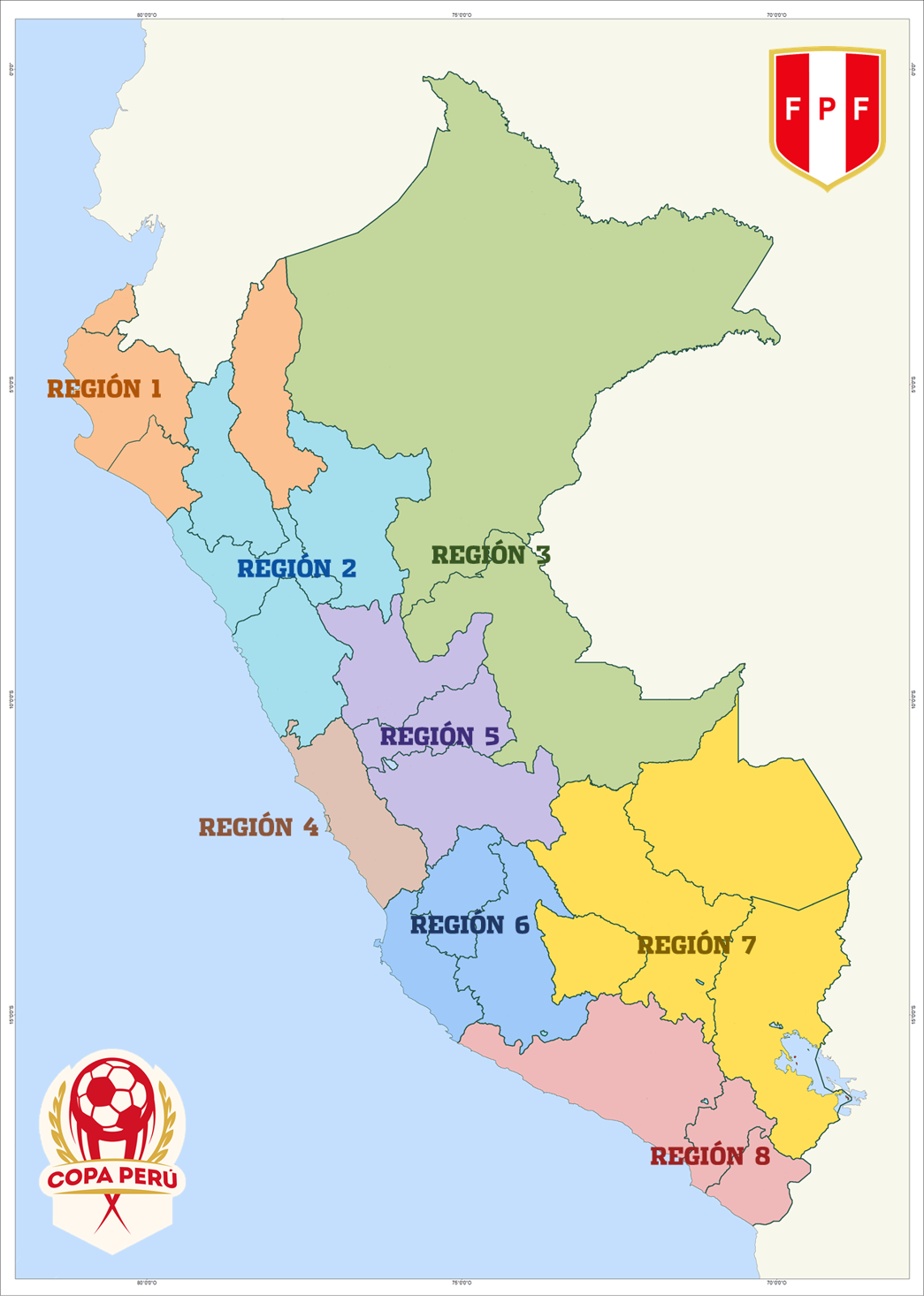
Regional Stage (2014)

In 1966, the First Division was named Descentralizado; teams from outside the capital of Lima were allowed to participate in the professional first division. The following year, the Copa Perú began, in which all non-professional teams in Peru were allowed to compete, with the winner to gain promotion to the First Division. After playing many elimination rounds, once six teams were left in the competition, they played in a final round-robin tournament in Lima.

After many years in 1984 the Peruvian Primera División grew from 16 to 44 teams : in the first part of the season a Regional Championship qualified the teams for the Descentralizado (second part of the season) with 16 to 18 teams; So the Copa Perú only qualified teams for the Regional Stage. The tournament declined and 1987 was the last year in which a Final was contested. But in 1992 the First Division returned to its original form (Descentralizado with 16 teams) so Copa Perú appeared again in 1993 as a Second Division but this time only for teams from outside Lima. Since 1993 there is also a Second Division (12 to 14 teams) for Lima teams.

For 1998 a major change took place: 8 teams - issued from the Regional Stage - qualified for the Final Stage. This stage was played as an authentic cup tournament on home and away matches; the winner gaining promotion to Peruvian Primera División. In 2004 Copa Perú the number of teams participating in the Final Stage was increased to 16 when the Second Division for Lima was again incorporated in the tournament; they also played an authentic cup tournament on home and away matches. In 2006, Peruvian Segunda División teams did not take part in the Copa Perú anymore. Furthermore, Copa Perú winner is still promoted to First Division, but the runner-up now gets promoted to Second Division (that now has teams from all over Peru).

== Format ==
Since the beginning of the Copa Perú, the departmental champions qualified for the Regional stage, where they were grouped by regions in order to qualify for the National stage and then the Final stage (Finalísima).

=== (1967) ===
Regional stage	Departments
Region Norte A	Cajamarca, Lambayeque, Piura, Tumbes
Region Norte B	Áncash, Huánuco, La Libertad, Pasco
Region Oriente	Loreto, San Martín
Region Centro	Ica, Junín, Lima
Region Sureste	Apurímac, Ayacucho, Cusco, Madre de Dios, Puno
Region Sur	Arequipa, Moquegua, Tacna

=== (1968–1969) ===
Regional stage	Departments
Region Norte A	Cajamarca, Lambayeque, Piura, Tumbes
Region Norte B	Áncash, Huánuco, La Libertad, Pasco
Region Oriente	Amazonas, Loreto, San Martín
Region Centro	Huancavelica, Ica, Junín, Lima
Region Sureste	Apurímac, Ayacucho, Cusco, Madre de Dios, Puno
Region Sur	Arequipa, Moquegua, Tacna

=== (1998–2003) ===
Regional stage	Departments
Region I	Amazonas, Lambayeque, Piura, Tumbes
Region II	Áncash, Cajamarca, La Libertad
Region III	Loreto, San Martín, Ucayali
Region IV	Callao, Ica, Lima
Region V	Huánuco, Junín, Pasco
Region VI	Apurímac, Ayacucho, Huancavelica
Region VII	Cusco, Madre de Dios, Puno
Region VIII	Arequipa, Moquegua, Tacna

=== (2004) ===
Regional stage	Departments
Region I	Amazonas, Lambayeque, Piura, Tumbes
Region II	Áncash, Cajamarca, La Libertad, San Martín
Region III	Huánuco, Junín, Pasco
Region IV	Ayacucho, Huancavelica, Ica
Region V	Callao, Lima, Loreto, Ucayali
Region VI	2004 Segunda División
Region VII	Arequipa, Moquegua, Tacna
Region VIII	Apurímac, Cusco, Madre de Dios, Puno

=== (2005) ===
Regional stage	Departments
Region I	Amazonas, Lambayeque, Piura, Tumbes
Region II	Áncash, Cajamarca, La Libertad, San Martín
Region III	2005 Segunda División
Region IV	Callao, Lima, Loreto, Ucayali
Region V	Ayacucho, Huancavelica, Ica
Region VI	Huánuco, Junín, Pasco
Region VII	Arequipa, Moquegua, Tacna
Region VIII	Apurímac, Cusco, Madre de Dios, Puno

=== (2006–2007) ===
Regional stage	Departments
Region I	Amazonas, Lambayeque, Piura, Tumbes
Region II	Áncash, Cajamarca, La Libertad, San Martín
Region III	Loreto, Ucayali
Region IV	Callao, Lima
Region V	Huancavelica, Junín, Pasco
Region VI	Ayacucho, Huánuco, Ica
Region VII	Arequipa, Moquegua, Tacna
Region VIII	Apurímac, Cusco, Madre de Dios, Puno

=== (2008–2014) ===
Regional stage	Departments
Region I	Amazonas, Lambayeque, Piura, Tumbes
Region II	Áncash, Cajamarca, La Libertad, San Martín
Region III	Loreto, Ucayali
Region IV	Callao, Lima
Region V	Huánuco, Junín, Pasco
Region VI	Ayacucho, Huancavelica, Ica
Region VII	Arequipa, Moquegua, Tacna
Region VIII	Apurímac, Cusco, Madre de Dios, Puno

== List of Regional champions ==
†	Copa Perú champion

Season		Champion	Runner-up
1967	Región Norte A	Juan Aurich	Alianza Atlético
1967	Región Norte B	Alfonso Ugarte de Chiclín	América de Samanco
1967	Región Oriente	CNI	Atlético Belén
1967	Región Centro	Octavio Espinosa	Unión Ocopilla
1967	Región Sureste	Cienciano	Real Carolino
1967	Región Sur	Melgar	Atlético Huracán
1968	Región Norte A	Sport Chorrillos	San Lorenzo
1968	Región Norte B	Carlos A. Mannucci	León de Huánuco
1968	Región Oriente	CNI	Nor Oriente
1968	Región Centro	Aurora Chancayllo	Víctor Bielich
1968	Región Sureste	Cienciano	UNSCH
1968	Región Sur	Melgar	Coronel Bolognesi
1969	Región Norte A	San Lorenzo	Alianza Atlético
1969	Región Norte B	Carlos A. Mannucci	Alfonso Ugarte de Chiclín
1969	Región Oriente	CNI	Cultural Juanjuí
1969	Región Centro	Unión Ocopilla	Social Huando
1969	Región Sureste	Salesianos	Deportivo Garcilaso
1969	Región Sur	Melgar	Mariscal Miller
1970	Región Norte A	Atlético Torino	
1970	Región Norte B	Defensor Casa Grande	
1970	Región Oriente	CNI	
1970	Región Centro	Unión Ocopilla	
1970	Región Sureste	Deportivo Garcilaso	
1970	Región Sur	Melgar	
1971	Región Norte A	Unión Tumán	
1971	Región Norte B	José Gálvez	
1971	Región Oriente	CNI	
1971	Región Centro	Social Huando	
1971	Región Sureste	Cienciano	
1971	Región Sur	Melgar	
1972	Región Norte A	Atlético Grau	
1972	Región Norte B	León de Huánuco	
1972	Región Oriente	Cultural Juanjuí	
1972	Región Centro	Deportivo Junín	
1972	Región Sureste	Cienciano	
1972	Región Sur	Deportivo Carsa	
1973	Región Norte A	Deportivo Pucalá	
1973	Región Norte B	Sider Perú	
1973	Región Oriente	CNI	
1973	Región Centro	Octavio Espinosa	
1973	Región Sureste	Cienciano	
1973	Región Sur	Sportivo Huracán	
1974		No champions crowned. It was only played until the Departamental Stage.^{[A]} (See: 1974 Reclasificatorio Regional)	
1976	Región I		
1976	Región II		
1976	Región III		
1976	Región IV		
1976	Región V		
1976	Región VI		
1977	Región I	UTC	
1977	Región II		
1977	Región III		
1977	Región IV		
1977	Región V	ADT	
1977	Región VI		
1978	Región I	UTC	
1978	Región II		
1978	Región III		
1978	Región IV		
1978	Región V	ADT	
1978	Región VI		
1979	Región I	Comercial Aguas Verdes	
1979	Región II	UTC	
1979	Región III	Deportivo Hospital	
1979	Región IV	Deportivo SIMA	
1979	Región V	ADT	
1979	Región VI	Centenario	
1979	Región VII	Deportivo Garcilaso	
1979	Región VIII	Pesca Perú	
1979	Región IX	Papelera Atlas	
1980	Región I	Los Aguerridos de Monsefú	Sport Bellavista
1980	Región II	UTC	José Gálvez
1980	Región III	Deportivo Aviación	Unión Zona Agraria
1980	Región IV	Octavio Espinosa	Independiente
1980	Región V	Juan Bielovucic	Progreso Muruhuay
1980	Región VI	Pesca Perú	Química Sol
1980	Región VII	Deportivo Garcilaso	Carlos Varea
1980	Región VIII	Miguel Grau	Centenario
1980	Región IX	Unión González Prada	Defensor Lima
1991	Región I	José Olaya (Talara)	
1991	Región II	Ovación Sipesa	
1991	Región III	El Tumi	
1991	Región IV	Sport Puerto Aéreo	
1991	Región V	Huracán Pilcomayo	
1991	Región VI	Sportivo Huracán	
1991	Región VII	Estudiantes Garcilaso	
1991	Región VIII	La Victoria	
1991	Región IX	Alcides Vigo	
1992		No tournament. (See: 1992 Torneo Zonal)	
1993	Región I	José Olaya (Paita)	
1993	Región II	Aurich-Cañaña	
1993	Región III	Unión Juventud	
1993	Región IV	Cosmos San Isidro	
1993	Región V	San Antonio de Uchiza	
1993	Región VI	CNI	
1993	Región VII	ADT	
1993	Región VIII	Mariano Santos	
1993	Región IX	Cultural Santa Rosa	
1993	Región X	Deportivo Garcilaso	
1993	Región XI	Aurora	
1993	Región XII	Carlos Varea	
1994	Región I	Atlético Torino	
1994	Región II	Boca Juniors	
1994	Región III	José Gálvez	
1994	Región IV	Octavio Espinosa	
1994	Región V	Atlético Nacional	
1994	Región VI	La Loretana	
1994	Región VII	Cultural Hidro	
1994	Región VIII	UNHEVAL	
1994	Región IX	Social Magdalena	
1994	Región X	Deportivo Garcilaso	
1994	Región XI	Aurora	
1994	Región XII	Alfonso Ugarte	
1995	Región I	UTC	
1995	Región II	Deportivo Marsa	
1995	Región III	La Loretana	
1995	Región IV	Diablos Rojos (Huancavelica)	
1995	Región V	Deportivo Municipal (Pacucha)	
1995	Región VI	Sportivo Huracán	
1996	Región I	UTC	Independiente Aguas Verdes
1996	Región II	José Gálvez	
1996	Región III	CNI	Cultural Sachapuyos
1996	Región IV	León de Huánuco	Unión Naranjillo
1996	Región V	Gigantes del Cenepa	Deportivo Garcilaso
1996	Región VI	Coronel Bolognesi	Deportivo Universitario
1997	Región I	Juan Aurich	
1997	Región II	Deportivo UPAO	
1997	Región III	CNI	
1997	Región IV	Cultural Hidro	
1997	Región V	Los Chankas	
1997	Región VI	Deportivo Universitario	
1998	Región I	IMI	Deportivo Pomalca
1998	Región II	UTC	Sport Áncash
1998	Región III	CNI	La Loretana
1998	Región IV	Telefunken 20	Estudiantes de Medicina
1998	Región V	Cultural Hidro	Señor de Puelles
1998	Región VI	Unión Grauina	Deportivo DASA
1998	Región VII	Alfonso Ugarte	Deportivo Garcilaso
1998	Región VIII	Coronel Bolognesi	Senati
1999	Región I	Deportivo Pomalca	UNP
1999	Región II	Deportivo UPAO	Sport Áncash
1999	Región III	El Tumi	José Pardo
1999	Región IV	Estudiantes de Medicina	Somos Aduanas
1999	Región V	Deportivo Municipal (El Tambo)	Atlético Arabecks
1999	Región VI	Deportivo Educación	Deportivo DASA
1999	Región VII	Alfonso Ugarte	Tintaya Marquiri
1999	Región VIII	Coronel Bolognesi	La Breña
2000	Región I	Atlético Grau	Deportivo Pomalca
2000	Región II	Sport Áncash	Lira Jesuense
2000	Región III	San Juan	Power Maíz
2000	Región IV	Estudiantes de Medicina	Aurora Chancayllo
2000	Región V	León de Huánuco	Cultural Hidro
2000	Región VI	Kola Real	Percy Berrocal
2000	Región VII	Deportivo Garcilaso	Alfonso Ugarte
2000	Región VIII	Coronel Bolognesi	Atlético Universidad
2001	Región I	Atlético Grau	Deportivo Pomalca
2001	Región II	Universidad César Vallejo	José Gálvez
2001	Región III	UNU	Deportivo Comercio
2001	Región IV	Somos Aduanas	Aceros Arequipa
2001	Región V	León de Huánuco	Deportivo Municipal (El Tambo)
2001	Región VI	Deportivo Educación	Deportivo Huáscar
2001	Región VII	Alfonso Ugarte	Deportivo Garcilaso
2001	Región VIII	Sport Bolito	Atlético Universidad
2002	Región I	Atlético Grau	Flamengo
2002	Región II	Universidad César Vallejo	José Gálvez
2002	Región III	CNI	San Juan
2002	Región IV	Juventud Torre Blanca	Atlético Chalaco
2002	Región V	León de Huánuco	Sport Dos de Mayo
2002	Región VI	UDA	San Francisco Santa María
2002	Región VII	Senati	Franciscano San Román
2002	Región VIII	Atlético Universidad	Bureau
2003	Región I	Flamengo	Atlético Grau
2003	Región II	Universidad César Vallejo	UTC
2003	Región III	UNAP	San Juan
2003	Región IV	Abraham Valdelomar	Nicolás de Piérola
2003	Región V	Echa Muni	Columna San Juan
2003	Región VI	Deportivo Educación	Juventud Gloria
2003	Región VII	Deportivo Garcilaso	Franciscano San Román
2003	Región VIII	Deportivo Enersur	Mariscal Miller
2004	Región I	Universidad de Chiclayo	Flamengo
2004	Región II	Sport Áncash	José Gálvez
2004	Región III	Echa Muni	Santa Rita
2004	Región IV	San José	Sport Alfonso Ugarte
2004	Región V	UNAP	Independiente
2004	Región VI	Olímpico Somos Perú	Deportivo Municipal
2004	Región VII	Juventus Corazón	Senati
2004	Región VIII	Franciscano San Román	Unión Carolina
2005	Región I	Olimpia	Boca Juniors
2005	Región II	UTC	José Gálvez
2005	Región III	Olímpico Somos Perú	Aviación-Coopsol
2005	Región IV	CNI	Atlético Minero
2005	Región V	Abraham Valdelomar	Sport Huamanga
2005	Región VI	Universitario (Yanacancha)	Tambillo Grande
2005	Región VII	Senati	Atlético Mollendo
2005	Región VIII	Deportivo Educación	Unión Carolina
2006	Región I	Juan Aurich	Corazón Micaelino
2006	Región II	ADA	Sport Vallejo
2006	Región III	CNI	Deportivo Hospital
2006	Región IV	Jesús del Valle	Hijos de Acosvinchos
2006	Región V	Sport Victoria	Sport Huamanga
2006	Región VI	León de Huánuco	Deportivo Ingeniería
2006	Región VII	Total Clean	Senati
2006	Región VIII	UANCV	Deportivo Educación
2007	Región I	Juan Aurich	Sporting Pizarro
2007	Región II	Sport Vallejo	Unión Tarapoto
2007	Región III	UNAP	Deportivo Hospital
2007	Región IV	Cooperativa Bolognesi	Óscar Benavides
2007	Región V	Sport Victoria	Sport Victoria
2007	Región VI	Sport Águila	Alianza Universidad
2007	Región VII	IDUNSA	Unión Minas de Orcopampa
2007	Región VIII	Deportivo Garcilaso	Deportivo Curibamba
2008	Región I	Atlético Torino	Renovación Pacífico
2008	Región II	Comerciantes Unidos	Defensor Porvenir
2008	Región III	CNI	Tecnológico
2008	Región IV	Íntimo Cable Visión	Unión Supe
2008	Región V	Alianza Universidad	Sport Huancayo
2008	Región VI	Sport Huamanga	Deportivo Municipal (Acoria)
2008	Región VII	Cobresol	IDUNSA
2008	Región VIII	Diablos Rojos	Policial Santa Rosa
2009	Región I	Defensor San José	San Francisco de Asís (Lonya Grande)
2009	Región II	Universitario de Trujillo	Carlos A. Mannucci
2009	Región III	Tecnológico	UNAP
2009	Región IV	DIM	Juventud La Rural
2009	Región V	Alianza Universidad	León de Huánuco
2009	Región VI	Froebel Deportes	Deportivo Municipal (Huamanga)
2009	Región VII	Unión Minas de Orcopampa	Unión Alfonso Ugarte
2009	Región VIII	José María Arguedas	Diablos Rojos
2010	Región I	Defensor San José	Atlético Grau
2010	Región II	Unión Comercio	Comerciantes Unidos
2010	Región III	Atlético Pucallpa	Deportivo Hospital
2010	Región IV	Géminis	Juventud Barranco
2010	Región V	ADT	Bella Durmiente
2010	Región VI	Sport Victoria	Joe Gutiérrez
2010	Región VII	Sportivo Huracán	Aurora
2010	Región VIII	Alianza Unicachi	Real Garcilaso
2011	Región I	Los Caimanes	Atlético Grau
2011	Región II	UTC	Universitario de Trujillo
2011	Región III	UNU	Los Tigres
2011	Región IV	Pacífico	Géminis
2011	Región V	Alianza Universidad	ADT
2011	Región VI	Defensor Zarumilla	Sport Victoria
2011	Región VII	Sportivo Huracán	Unión Minas de Orcopampa
2011	Región VIII	Real Garcilaso	José María Arguedas
2012	Región I	Sporting Pizarro	Académicos Alfred Nobel
2012	Región II	UTC	Juventud Bellavista
2012	Región III	Alianza Cristiana	Defensor San Alejandro
2012	Región IV	Walter Ormeño	Deportivo Municipal
2012	Región V	Juventud Ticlacayán	Deportivo Municipal (Mazamari)
2012	Región VI	Sport Victoria	Defensor Zarumilla
2012	Región VII	Sportivo Huracán	Deportivo Credicoop
2012	Región VIII	Binacional	Alfonso Ugarte
2013	Región I	UD Chulucanas	Willy Serrato
2013	Región II	Comerciantes Unidos	Carlos A. Mannucci
2013	Región III	Sport Loreto	CNI
2013	Región IV	Unión Huaral	AIPSA
2013	Región V	Alipio Ponce	Ecosem
2013	Región VI	San Ignacio	Deportivo Municipal (Santillana)
2013	Región VII	San Simón	Saetas de Oro
2013	Región VIII	Unión Fuerza Minera	Binacional
2014	Región I	Defensor La Bocana	Cristal Tumbes
2014	Región II	Sport Chavelines	Sport Rosario
2014	Región III	Sport Loreto	Santa Rosa
2014	Región IV	Aurora Chancayllo	Juventud América
2014	Región V	Sport Águila	Unión Pichanaki
2014	Región VI	Defensor Zarumilla	Player Villafuerte
2014	Región VII	Sportivo Cariocos	Futuro Majes
2014	Región VIII	Unión Fuerza Minera	Unión Alta Huarca
Defunct Tournament

=== Footnotes ===
A. In this year the tournament ended at the Departamental Stage and no Final took place. The departamental champions qualified for the 1974 Reclasificatorio Regional with the last teams from the 1973 Torneo Descentralizado that had to revalidate the category. At the end of the 1974 Reclasificatorio Regional, the teams Alfonso Ugarte, Barrio Frigorífico, Carlos A. Mannucci, Deportivo Junín, Piérola, Unión Huaral, Unión Pesquero and Walter Ormeño were promoted to the 1974 Torneo Descentralizado.
B. From 1988 to 1992, no Final tournaments were held. Regional champions entered the Peruvian Primera División’s Regional tournaments.

== See also ==
- List of football clubs in Peru
- Peruvian football league system
