= Nicolás Celis =

Peruvian footballer (born 1984)

Personal information
- Full name: Juan Nicolás Celis Ríos
- Date of birth: October 24, 1984 (age 42)
- Place of birth: Iquitos, Peru
- Height: 1.73 m (5 ft 8 in)
- Position: Forward

Youth career
- Deportivo UNAP

Senior career*
Years	Team	Apps	(Gls)
2002–2004	Deportivo UNAP	?	(?)
2005	Colegio Nacional Iquitos		
2006	FBC Melgar		
2007	Deportivo Hospital		
2008–2009	Colegio Nacional Iquitos	37	(6)
2010	José Gálvez FBC	36	(1)
2011	Colegio Nacional Iquitos	16	(1)
2014	Comerciantes Unidos	12	(2)
- * Club domestic league appearances and goals

Nicolás Celis Ríos (born October 24, 1984) is a Peruvian former professional footballer who played as a forward.

== Career ==
=== Early career ===
Celis developed as a footballer in C.D. Universidad Nacional de la Amazonía Peruana (Deportivo UNAP). There he played in the District League of Iquitos. Then in 2005 he joined Iquito's biggest club Colegio Nacional de Iquitos for the 2005 Copa Perú, which they were eliminated from in the Round of 16 by Olímpico Somos Perú 3–3 on aggregate.

=== FBC Melgar ===
Then in 2006 Celis would have a very short stint playing for Peruvian First Division club FBC Melgar, Arequipa's most popular club. Celis made his official debut in the Peruvian First Division with FBC Melgar on March 12, 2006, in the 2006 season. He came on in the 77th minute for José Carlos Fernández, and his club went on to defeat Unión Huaral 3–1 at home. His manager at the time Teddy Cardama allowed Nicolás to play the following match, away to Sporting Cristal. He entered the match replacing José Carlos Fernández in the 80th minute, but his club still lost 3–0. This would be his last appearance for FBC Melgar.

=== Asociación Deportiva Hospital ===
Then he in 2007 he joined Pucallpa based club Asociación Deportiva Hospital, which was playing in the Copa Perú division at the time. In the 2007 Copa Perú season, his club managed to make it all the way to the semifinals. There they were eliminated by the eventual champions that season, Club Juan Aurich, 3–1 on aggregate.

=== Return to Colegio Nacional Iquitos ===
Then in 2008 he returned to Colegio Nacional de Iquitos and helped them reach promotion at the end of the 2008 Copa Perú season. Celis played a part in the last three defining matches for promotion to the Peruvian First Division. They eventually finished one point behind the champions Sport Huancayo but were still granted promotion.

Celis made his Peruvian First Division debut in Colegio Nacional de Iquitos colors in Round 1 of the 2009 Torneo Descentralizado season at home against Sporting Cristal. He was in the starting line-up and then was substituted by Andrei Reátegui in the 71st minute of the match, which finished in a scoreless draw.
