= 2005 FBC Melgar season =

FBC Melgar
2005 season
- Stadium: Estadio Melgar
- Torneo Descentralizado: Torneo Apertura: Nineth (9°); Torneo Clausura: Seventh (7°); Aggregate Table: Nineth (9°); Nineth National (9°)
Home colours	Away colours	Third colours

The 2005 FBC Melgar season were the Ninety-First (91.º) of the club from its foundation in 1915, Thirty-Six (36) participations in the top-flight of Peruvian Primera División (of 89 Editions) with denomination Torneo Descentralizado. In Previous Season the club qualified as 8th Place of the 2004 Torneo Descentralizado.

Melgar were a of thirteen (13) clubs in the Fortieth edition (40.º) Torneo Descentralizado, the competition most important of the Peruvian football. The club played the Peruvian Primera División.

== Torneo Descentralizado ==
=== Torneo Apertura ===
Pos	Team	Pld	W	D	L	GF	GA	GD	Pts
8	Sport Boys	24	8	7	9	31	34	-3	31
9	Melgar	24	7	6	11	32	42	-10	27
10	Atlético Universidad	24	5	8	11	26	40	-14	23

== See also ==
- FBC Melgar
- 2005 Torneo Descentralizado
