= Independiente de Cañete =

Peruvian football club

Independiente
- Full name: Club Atlético Independiente
- Nickname: La I
- Founded: August 30, 1938
- Ground: Estadio Roberto Yañez, Cañete
- Capacity: 6,000
- League: Copa Perú
Home colours	Away colours

Club Atlético Independiente (sometimes referred as Independiente de Cañete) is a Peruvian football club, playing in the city of Cañete, Lima, Peru.

== History ==
The Club Atlético Independiente was founded on August 30, 1938.

In 2004 Copa Perú, the club qualified to the National Stage, but was eliminated by Olímpico Somos Perú in the Round of 16.

In 2006 Copa Perú, the club qualified to the Departamental Stage, but was eliminated by Jesús del Valle in the Semifinals.

In 2018 Copa Perú, the club qualified to the Departamental Stage, but was eliminated by Defensor Laure Sur in the Quarterfinals.

== Rivalries ==
Independiente has had a long-standing rivalry with local club Walter Ormeño.

== Former players ==
- (Bulgaria) Jordan Petrov

== Honours ==
=== Regional ===
- Región V:

Winners (1): 2004

- Liga Departamental de Lima:

Winners (7): 1971, 1974, 1978, 1979, 1980, 1981, 1994
Runner-up (4): 1972, 1975, 2000, 2004

- Liga Provincial de Cañete:

Winners (11): 1974, 1975, 1979, 1994, 1996, 2000, 2003, 2006, 2007, 2009, 2016
Runner-up (5): 2004, 2013, 2017, 2018, 2025

- Liga Distrital de San Vicente:

Winners (6): 1971, 1972, 2000, 2012, 2017, 2025
Runner-up (7): 2007, 2009, 2011, 2013, 2014, 2016, 2018

== See also ==
- List of football clubs in Peru
- Peruvian football league system
