= Javier Atoche =

Peruvian footballer and manager (born 1973)

Personal information
- Full name: Javier Eduardo Atoche Negrón
- Date of birth: 14 January 1973
- Place of birth: Piura, Peru
- Position: Left-back

Youth career
- 1985: Sport Lima
- 1987: Estrella Roja

Senior career*
Years	Team	Apps	(Gls)
1989–1992	Atlético Grau		
1993	Ciclista Lima		
1994	Guardia Republicana		
1995	Atlético Torino		
1996–?	Deportivo Marsa		

Managerial career
- 2005–2006: Olimpia FC
- 2008: Atlético Grau
- 2009: Municipal de Vice
- 2012: Atlético Grau
- 2013–2014: Defensor La Bocana
- 2015–2016: Defensor La Bocana
- 2016: Juventud Cautivo
- 2018: Juventud Cautivo
- 2019: Defensor La Bocana
- 2019: Sport Estrella
- 2020: Sport Victoria
- 2021: Sport Victoria
- 2021: Juvenil UTC
- 2021: UD Parachique
- 2022: Las Palmas de Chota
- 2023: Olimpia FC
- 2024: Municipal de Vice
- * Club domestic league appearances and goals

Javier Eduardo Atoche Negrón (born 14 January 1973) is a Peruvian football manager and former player.

== Playing career ==
Javier Atoche made his debut in the Peruvian first division in 1990 with Atlético Grau in his hometown of Piura. In 1993, he moved to Lima and played in the second division for Ciclista Lima and Guardia Republicana before returning to the north to play in 1995 for Atlético Torino, a club recently promoted to the first division. He finished his career at Deportivo Marsa.

== Managerial career ==
Atoche made his coaching debut at Olimpia FC in 2005 before taking charge of his first club, Atlético Grau, in 2008 then a second time in 2012. In 2013, he was appointed coach of Defensor La Bocana, a club where he managed to win the Copa Perú two years later. He managed his first match in the Peruvian first division on 6 February 2016 against Juan Aurich (2–1 defeat).

== Honours ==
=== Manager ===
Defensor La Bocana

- Copa Perú: 2015
