= Alfonso Ugarte de Tacna =

- Full name: Club Deportivo Alfonso Ugarte
- Nickname(s): Chatos del Callao; Ugartinos
- Founded: 9 October 1929; 95 years ago
- Ground: Jorge Basadre, Tacna
- Capacity: 19,850
- League: Copa Perú
Home colours	Away colours

Club Deportivo Alfonso Ugarte (sometimes referred as Alfonso Ugarte de Tacna) is a Peruvian football club, playing in the city of Tacna, Tacna, Peru.

== History ==
The Club Deportivo Alfonso Ugarte was founded on October 9, 1929.

In the 2005 Copa Perú, the club qualified to the Regional Stage, but was eliminated by Senati and Social Chalaca.

In the 2006 Copa Perú, the club qualified to the Regional Stage, but was eliminated by Senati and Deportivo GER.

== Rivalries ==
Alfonso Ugarte has had a long-standing rivalry with local club Coronel Bolognesi. The rivalry between Ugarte and Bolognesi known as the Clásico Tacneño.

== Honours ==
=== Regional ===
- Liga Departamental de Tacna:

Winners (2): 2005, 2006

- Liga Provincial de Tacna:

Winners (3): 1945, 1956, 2005
Runner-up (1): 1955

== See also ==
- List of football clubs in Peru
- Peruvian football league system
