= Estadio Municipal de La Unión =

Sports stadium in La Unión, Peru

- Interactive map of Estadio Municipal de La Unión
- Full name: Estadio Municipal de La Unión
- Location: La Unión, Piura, Peru
- Coordinates: 5.40808°S 80.74817°W
- Owner: Instituto Peruano del Deporte
- Capacity: 5,000

Tenants
- Atlético Grau; Olimpia

Estadio Municipal de La Unión is a multi-use stadium in La Unión, Piura, Peru. It is currently used mostly for football matches and is the home stadium of Olimpia de La Unión of the Copa Perú. The stadium holds 5,000 spectators. The Copa Peru was held there in 2023.
