= 2005 Peruvian Segunda División =

Peruvian Segunda División
- Season: 2005
- Dates: 14 May – 22 October 2005
- Champions: Olímpico Somos Perú
- Runner up: Aviación-Coopsol
- Relegated: Somos Aduanas; Unión de Campeones; Virgen de Chapi; AELU
- Top goalscorer: Juan Luna (18 goals)

The 2005 Peruvian Segunda División, the second division of Peruvian football (soccer), was played by 12 teams. The tournament winner, Olímpico Somos Perú was promoted to the Copa Perú. The last places, AELU, Virgen de Chapi, Unión de Campeones and Somos Aduanas were relegated. The tournament was played on a home-and-away round-robin basis.

== Teams ==
=== Team changes ===
| Promoted from 2004 Liga Provincial de Lima | Relegated to 2005 Copa Perú |
|---|---|
| ▲ América Cochahuayco (1st) | ▼ Alcides Vigo (12th) |

=== Stadia and Locations ===
| Team | City |
|---|---|
| AELU | Pueblo Libre, Lima |
| América Cochahuayco | San Luis, Lima |
| Aviación-Coopsol | Lima |
| Deportivo Municipal | Cercado de Lima |
| Defensor Villa del Mar | Villa El Salvador, Lima |
| La Peña Sporting | Lince, Lima |
| Olímpico Somos Perú | Surco, Lima |
| Somos Aduanas | Callao |
| Sporting Cristal B | Rímac, Lima |
| Unión de Campeones | Ate, Lima |
| Universidad San Marcos | Cercado de Lima |
| Virgen de Chapi | Santa Anita, Lima |

== League table ==
=== Standings ===
| Pos | Team | Pld | W | D | L | GF | GA | GD | Pts | Qualification or relegation |
|---|---|---|---|---|---|---|---|---|---|---|
| 1 | Olímpico Somos Perú (C) | 22 | 13 | 7 | 2 | 52 | 22 | +30 | 46 | 2005 Copa Perú - National Stage |
| 2 | Aviación-Coopsol | 22 | 11 | 9 | 2 | 41 | 21 | +20 | 42 | 2005 Copa Perú - National Stage |
| 3 | Deportivo Municipal | 22 | 12 | 5 | 5 | 45 | 25 | +20 | 41 | |
| 4 | Universidad San Marcos | 22 | 11 | 6 | 5 | 30 | 20 | +10 | 39 | |
| 5 | La Peña Sporting | 22 | 10 | 6 | 6 | 25 | 20 | +5 | 36 | |
| 6 | Sporting Cristal B (Note: Sporting Cristal B can´t be promoted as they are the "reserve team" of Sporting Cristal which plays in First Division.) | 22 | 10 | 5 | 7 | 28 | 22 | +6 | 35 | |
| 7 | América Cochahuayco | 22 | 6 | 10 | 6 | 28 | 20 | +8 | 28 | |
| 8 | Defensor Villa del Mar | 22 | 6 | 7 | 9 | 27 | 37 | −10 | 25 | |
| 9 | AELU (R) | 22 | 4 | 10 | 8 | 13 | 29 | −16 | 22 | 2006 Copa Perú |
| 10 | Virgen de Chapi (R) | 22 | 5 | 4 | 13 | 26 | 34 | −8 | 19 | 2006 Copa Perú |
| 11 | Unión de Campeones (R) | 22 | 4 | 7 | 11 | 17 | 34 | −17 | 19 | 2006 Copa Perú |
| 12 | Somos Aduanas (R) | 22 | 1 | 2 | 19 | 10 | 58 | −48 | 5 | 2006 Copa Perú |

Updated to match(es) played on 2005. Source:
Rules for classification: 1) points; 2) goal difference; 3) number of goals scored.
(C) Champions; (R) Relegated

== Results ==
| Home \ Away | AELU | AME | DAV | DVM | DMU | LPS | OAM | DSA | CRI | USM | CMP | VCH |
|---|---|---|---|---|---|---|---|---|---|---|---|---|
| AELU | | 3–1 | 0–4 | 0–0 | 1–0 | 0–2 | 0–0 | 1–1 | 0–0 | 0–1 | 0–2 | 1–0 |
| América Cochahuayco | 0–0 | | 1–1 | 5–1 | 4–1 | 1–2 | 1–1 | 3–0 | 0–1 | 2–0 | 1–1 | 2–0 |
| Aviación-Coopsol | 1–1 | 0–0 | | 1–0 | 1–1 | 0–0 | 1–4 | 4–0 | 5–3 | 1–1 | 2–2 | 1–0 |
| Defensor Villa del Mar | 1–1 | 0–0 | 1–1 | | 1–5 | 0–1 | 0–0 | 2–1 | 2–3 | 1–2 | 2–0 | 1–0 |
| Deportivo Municipal | 1–1 | 1–1 | 0–3 | 2–1 | | 1–0 | 0–4 | 6–0 | 2–1 | 1–0 | 1–1 | 4–2 |
| La Peña Sporting | 0–0 | 1–0 | 3–0 | 2–2 | 1–2 | | 0–2 | 2–2 | 2–1 | 3–3 | 0–0 | 2–1 |
| Olímpico Somos Perú | 7–0 | 1–0 | 1–4 | 4–1 | 0–1 | 2–0 | | 2–0 | 1–1 | 2–1 | 3–1 | 3–3 |
| Somos Aduanas | 2–0 | 0–2 | 0–5 | 2–4 | 0–6 | 0–1 | 1–5 | | 0–2 | 0–1 | 1–2 | 0–3 |
| Sporting Cristal B | 3–0 | 2–2 | 0–1 | 3–0 | 0–3 | 1–0 | 0–2 | 1–0 | | 0–0 | 3–1 | 0–0 |
| Universidad San Marcos | 1–0 | 0–0 | 1–2 | 1–2 | 1–1 | 2–0 | 4–4 | 4–0 | 1–0 | | 1–0 | 1–0 |
| Unión de Campeones | 0–2 | 1–1 | 1–1 | 1–3 | 1–6 | 0–1 | 0–0 | 1–0 | 0–2 | 0–1 | | 2–0 |
| Virgen de Chapi | 2–2 | 3–1 | 1–2 | 2–2 | 1–0 | 0–2 | 3–4 | 1–0 | 0–1 | 1–3 | 3–0 | |

Updated to match(es) played on November, 2005. Source: RSSSF
Legend: Blue = home team win; Yellow = draw; Red = away team win.

== See also ==
- 2005 Torneo Descentralizado
- 2005 Copa Perú
