= Deportivo Enersur =

Peruvian football club

- Full name: Club Deportivo Enersur
- Founded: February 1, 2003
- Ground: Estadio Mariscal Nieto, Ilo
- League: Copa Perú
Home colours	Away colours

Club Deportivo Enersur is a Peruvian football club, playing in the city of Ilo, Moquegua, Peru.

== History ==
The Club Deportivo Enersur was founded on February 1, 2003, with the support of the company Enersur, now known as ENGIE Energía Perú. The club acquired the league position of Academia H. García, which had earned promotion to the Liga Distrital de Ilo the previous year.

In its first participation, the club won the departmental championship after defeating Deportivo Municipal de Matalaque in the final. It later reached the National Stage of the 2003 Copa Perú, where it was eliminated in the semifinals by Deportivo Educación from the city of Abancay, in the Apurímac department.

In the 2004 Copa Perú, 2006, and 2009, the Moquegua-based club won the departmental championship of Moquegua. However, in each of those campaigns, it was eliminated during the Regional Stage.

== Honours ==
=== Regional ===
- Región VIII:

Winners (1): 2003

- Liga Departamental de Moquegua:

Winners (6): 2003, 2004, 2006, 2009, 2015, 2016
Runner-up (1): 2014

- Liga Provincial de Ilo:

Winners (4): 2003, 2009, 2013, 2015
Runner-up (4): 2004, 2011, 2014, 2016

- Liga Distrital de Ilo:

Winners (6): 2003, 2006, 2011, 2015, 2023, 2026
Runner-up (6): 2009, 2013, 2014, 2016, 2017, 2018

== See also ==
- List of football clubs in Peru
- Peruvian football league system
