= Atlético Mollendo =

- Full name: Sport Club Atlético Mollendo
- Nicknames: La Estrellita Solitaria; Granates
- Founded: October 10, 1945; 80 years ago
- Ground: Estadio Municipal de Mollendo, Mollendo
- Capacity: 5,000
- League: Copa Perú
Home colours	Away colours

Sport Club Atlético Mollendo (sometimes referred as Atlético Mollendo) is a Peruvian football club, playing in the city of Mollendo, Arequipa, Peru.

== History ==
The Club Atlético Mollendo was founded on October 10, 1945.

In 2005 Copa Perú, the club qualified to the National Stage, but was eliminated by Deportivo Educación in the Round of 16.

In 2012 Copa Perú, the club qualified to the Departamental Stage, but was eliminated when it finished in 3rd place.

In 2014 Copa Perú, the club qualified to the Departamental Stage, but was eliminated in the Group Stage.

In 2015 Copa Perú, the club qualified to the Departamental Stage, but was eliminated in the Group Stage.

In 2016 Copa Perú, the club qualified to the Departamental Stage, but was eliminated by Binacional in the Second Stage.

== Honours ==
=== Regional ===
- Región VII:

Runner-up (1): 2005

- Liga Departamental de Arequipa:

Runner-up (1): 2005

- Liga Provincial de Islay:

Winners (4): 2012, 2014, 2015, 2016
Runner-up (1): 2007

- Liga Distrital de Mollendo:

Winners (6): 1974, 1976, 1992, 2005, 2012, 2015
Runner-up (2): 2014, 2016

== See also ==
- List of football clubs in Peru
- Peruvian football league system
