= Club Deportivo Unión Fuerza Minera =

Peruvian football club

Unión Fuerza Minera
- Full name: Club Deportivo Unión Fuerza Minera
- Founded: 28 September 2010; 15 years ago
- Stadium: Estadio Municipal de Putina, Putina
- League: Copa Perú
- 2017: Departamental Stage
| Home colours | Away colours |

Unión Fuerza Minera is a Peruvian football club, playing in the city of Putina, Puno, Peru.

== History ==
In the 2010 Copa Perú, the club qualified to the Regional Stage, but was eliminated by José María Arguedas and Real Garcilaso.

In the 2013 Copa Perú, the club qualified to the National Stage, but was eliminated by Saetas de Oro in the Round of 16.

In the 2014 Copa Perú, the club qualified to the National Stage, but was defeated by Sport Loreto in the Final.

In 2015, the club withdrew from participating in the 2015 Segunda División due to financial problems.

In the 2022 Copa Perú, the club qualified to the Departamental Stage, but the club withdrew from participating due to financial problems.

== Coach ==
- (Peru) Agapito Alberto Rodríguez Bermejo (2011)
- (Peru) Martín Dall'Orso (2013)
- (Peru) Leonardo Morales Bazán (2013)
- (Peru) Estip Hancco Cáceres (2014)
- (Peru) José Luis Suárez (2014)
- (Peru) Leonardo Morales Bazán (2014)
- (Peru) Fredy García (2015)
- (Peru) Estip Hancco Cáceres (2015)
- (Peru) José Luis Bustamante (2015)
- (Peru) José Ramírez Cubas (2015)
- (Peru) Leonardo Morales Bazán (2016)
- (Peru) José Ramírez Cubas (2018)
- (Peru) Italo Herrera (2019)

== Honours ==
=== National ===
- Copa Perú:

Runner-up (1): 2014

=== Regional ===
- Región VIII:

Winners (1): 2014

- Liga Departamental de Puno:

Winners (2): 2015, 2016
Runner-up (3): 2010, 2013, 2014

- Liga Superior de Puno:

Winners (1): 2010

- Liga Provincial de San Antonio de Putina:

Winners (8): 2013, 2014, 2015, 2016, 2017, 2018, 2019, 2022

== See also ==
- List of football clubs in Peru
- Peruvian football league system
