= Horacio Baldessari =

Argentine footballer

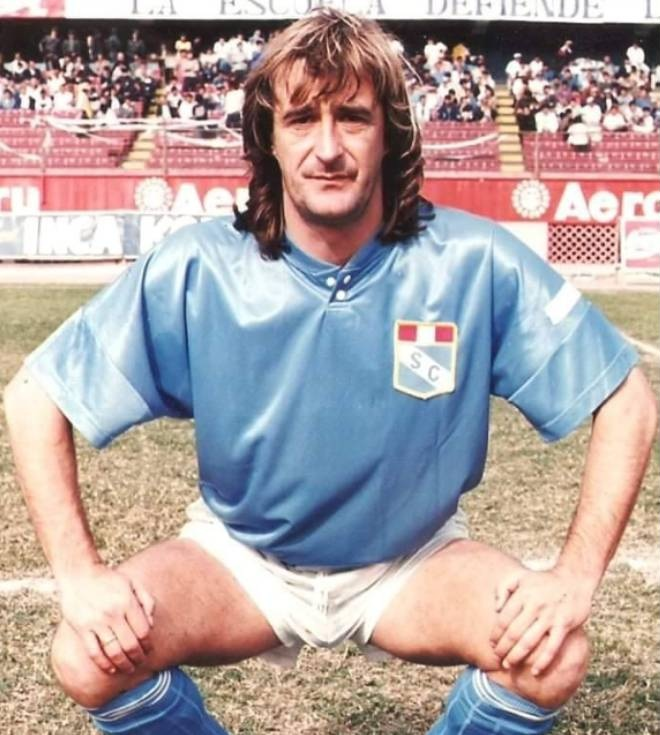

Personal information
- Full name: Horacio Raúl Baldessari Guntero
- Date of birth: November 21, 1958 (age 67)
- Place of birth: Córdoba, Argentina
- Height: 1.77 m (5 ft 10 in)
- Position: Striker

Senior career*
Years	Team	Apps	(Gls)
1975	Sportivo Belgrano		
1976–1977	Belgrano de Córdoba		
1978–1979	Blooming		
1980	Belgrano de Córdoba		
1981	Racing de Córdoba		
1981–1982	Oriente Petrolero		
1983	Bolívar		
1984	Blooming		
1985	Bolívar		
1986–1987	Destroyers		
1988–1989	Belgrano de Córdoba		
1989	Blooming		
1990	Deportivo Municipal		
1991–1993	Sporting Cristal		

Managerial career
- 1994: Aurich-Cañaña
- 2000: Deportivo Municipal
- 2007: Juan Aurich
- 2008: Atlético Chalaco
- * Club domestic league appearances and goals as of May 12, 2008

Horacio Raúl "Pepa" Baldessari (born 21 November 1958 in Córdoba) is a former Argentine football striker who played professionally in Argentina, Bolivia and Peru during the late 1970s, 1980s and early 1990s. He also managed some clubs after his retirement, but currently works as a football analyst.

== Club career ==
He began his career in 1975 with modest club Sportivo Belgrano, but joined Belgrano de Córdoba the following season. In 1978, he went abroad to play for Bolivian side Blooming. Years later he would also play for Oriente Petrolero, Bolívar and Destroyers. During his spell in the Bolivian league, he scored a total of 161 goals, placing his name eight in the list of all-time topscorers. Even though Baldessari became a naturalized Bolivian, he was never considered as an option for the national team. In 1988, he returned to Argentina and played for his beloved Belgrano de Córdoba once again. By 1990, he transferred to Peruvian side Deportivo Municipal before signing with popular team Sporting Cristal the following year. At first he was heavily questioned by club fans and the media about his age; nonetheless, La Pepa proved them wrong and finished the season as the topscorer that year with 25 goals, and consequently helped Cristal win the 1991 Peruvian title. Baldessari always admitted having spent the best years of his career playing for the cerveceros because he received so many affections that made him feel like at home. After his retirement in 1993, Baldessari settled in Lima, and became a football analyst for several television and radio networks.

== Club titles ==
Season	Club	Title
1983	Bolívar	Liga de Fútbol Profesional Boliviano
1984	Blooming	Liga de Fútbol Profesional Boliviano
1985	Bolívar	Liga de Fútbol Profesional Boliviano
1991	Sporting Cristal	Primera División Peruana

== Honours ==
Season	Club	Title
1979	Blooming	Liga de Fútbol Profesional Boliviano top scorer: 31 goals
1982	Oriente Petrolero	Liga de Fútbol Profesional Boliviano top scorer: 25 goals
1991	Sporting Cristal	Primera División Peruana top scorer: 25 goals
