= José Ramírez Cubas =

Peruvian footballer and manager (born 1962)

Personal information
- Full name: José Homero Ramírez Cubas
- Date of birth: 16 April 1962 (age 64)
- Place of birth: Chepén, Peru
- Position: Defender

Senior career*
Years	Team	Apps	(Gls)
- UTC
- Alianza Atlético
- Carlos A. Mannucci

Managerial career
- 1999: Deportivo UPAO
- 2000: Club Hidro
- 2000–2001: Estudiantes de Medicina
- 2002: Atlético Grau
- 2003: UTC
- 2004: Academia Municipal
- 2005–2006: José Gálvez FBC
- 2006: UTC
- 2006: Juan Aurich
- 2007: Atlético Torino
- 2007–2008: Atlético Minero
- 2008–2009: Sport Huancayo
- 2009: Universitario (Trujillo)
- 2009: Cobresol
- 2010: Real Garcilaso
- 2010: Atlético Grau
- 2011: Los Caimanes
- 2012: Carlos A. Mannucci
- 2012: Universitario Miguel Grau
- 2013: Atlético Grau
- 2014: Sport Loreto
- 2014: Unión Chulucanas
- 2015: Sport Chavelines
- 2016: Sport Águila
- 2017: Atlético Grau
- 2018: Club Fuerza Minera
- 2018: Credicoop San Román
- 2019: ADT
- 2020: Alejandro Villanueva
- 2022: FC Cahusiños
- 2022: Universitario (Puno)
- 2023: Estudiantes San Miguel
- 2023: Diablos Rojos (Juliaca)
- 2024: AD Cajabamba
- 2024: Cultural Volante
- 2024: Deportivo Municipal (Pangoa)
- 2025: Unión Minas
- 2025: Credicoop San Román
- * Club domestic league appearances and goals

José Homero Ramírez Cubas (born on 16 April 1962) is a Peruvian football manager and former player. He is known for his record of winning the Copa Perú five times as a head coach

== Biography ==
José Ramírez Cubas spent most of his football career playing for clubs in northern Peru, including Alianza Atlético, Carlos A. Mannucci and UTC.

After becoming a coach, he began his coaching career in 1998 and specialized almost exclusively in managing Copa Perú (fourth division) clubs, holding the record for the most wins in the competition with five: Deportivo UPAO (1999), Estudiantes de Medicina (2000), José Gálvez (2005), Sport Huancayo (2008) and Sport Loreto (2014). This success earned him the nickname "the Mourinho of the Copa Perú".

He had the opportunity to manage in the Peruvian first division four times: in 2001 with Estudiantes de Medicina, then in 2006 with José Gálvez FBC, and two years later with Atlético Minero, when he led the latter club to promotion for the first time, defeating Sport Águila 3–0 in the promotion playoff on 13 January 2008. Finally, in 2009, he managed Sport Huancayo. But all four experiences were short-lived.

== Honours ==
=== Manager ===
Deportivo UPAO

- Copa Perú: 1999

Estudiantes de Medicina

- Copa Perú: 2000

José Gálvez FBC

- Copa Perú: 2005

Sport Huancayo

- Copa Perú: 2008

Sport Loreto

- Copa Perú: 2014
