= Deportivo Ingeniería =

Peruvian football club

Club Deportivo Ingeniería
- Full name: Club Deportivo Ingeniería
- Nickname(s): Granates
- Founded: 18 September 2002
- Ground: Estadio Huancayo, Huancayo, Peru
- Capacity: 17,000
- Chairman: Cesar Espinoza Sueldo
- League: Copa Perú
Home colours	Away colours

Club Deportivo Ingeniería is a Peruvian football club, based in the city of Huancayo, of the Junín Region in Peru.

== History ==
In the 2006 Copa Perú, the club qualified to the National Stage. They eliminated Sport Victoria of Ica in the round of 16 and Sport Huamanga of Ayacucho in the quarterfinals. However, the club was defeated by eventual champions, Total Clean, in the semifinals.

== Honours ==
=== Regional ===
- Región VI:
  - Runners-up (1): 2006
- Liga Departamental de Junín:
  - Winners (1): 2006
- Liga Provincial de Huancayo:
  - Winners (1): 2006
  - Runners-up (1): 2007
- Liga Distrital de Huancayo:
  - Winners (2): 2006, 2011
  - Runner-up (1): 2015

== See also ==
- List of football clubs in Peru
- Peruvian football league system
