= Deportivo Comercio =

Peruvian football club

- Full name: Club Asociación Deportivo Comercio
- Founded: 1 June 1995; 29 years ago
- Ground: Gran Pajatén Stadium, Juanjuí
- Capacity: 6,000
- League: Copa Perú
- 2017: Departamental Stage
Home colours

Deportivo Comercio is a Peruvian football club, playing in the city of Juanjuí, San Martín, Peru.

== History ==
Not to be confused with Deportivo Comercio from the city of Moyobamba, which played in the 1991 Torneo Descentralizado, Deportivo Comercio from the city of Juanjuí were founded in 1995. Deportivo Comercio is one of the clubs with the greatest tradition in the city of Juanjuí, San Martín, Peru.

In 2001, 2004, and 2006, the club qualified to Regional Stage but was eliminated.

== Honours ==
=== Regional ===
- Región III:

Runner-up (1): 2001

- Liga Departalmental de San Martín:

Winners (2): 2001, 2006
Runner-up (1): 2004

- Liga Provincial de Mariscal Cáceres:

Winners (8): 2001, 2004, 2005, 2006, 2008, 2009, 2017, 2024

- Liga Distrital de Juanjuí:

Winners (7): 2001, 2004, 2005, 2006, 2008, 2009, 2017
Runner-up (3): 2011, 2016, 2024

== See also ==
- List of football clubs in Peru
- Peruvian football league system
