= Olimpia FC =

Olimpia
- Full name: Olimpia Fútbol Club
- Nickname: Canarios
- Founded: April 25, 1954; 71 years ago
- Ground: Estadio Municipal de La Unión, La Unión
- Chairman: Carlos Bayona Zapata
- Manager: Javier Atoche
- League: Copa Perú
Home colours	Away colours

Olimpia Fútbol Club (sometimes referred as Olimpia) is a Peruvian football club, playing in the city of La Unión, Piura, Peru.

== History ==
The Olimpia F.C. was founded on April 25, 1954, and is named in honor of the Paraguayan club Olimpia.

In 1976, the club qualified for the departmental final but was defeated by Atlético Torino.

In 2004 Copa Perú, the club qualified to the Regional Stage, but was eliminated by Flamengo.

In 2005 Copa Perú, the club qualified to the National Stage, but was eliminated by José Gálvez in the Round of 16.

The club was the 2006 Departmental champion of Piura after winning the final 2–1 against Corazón Micaelino.

In 2006 Copa Perú, the club qualified to the Regional Stage, but was eliminated by Juan Aurich.

In 2006 Copa Perú, the club qualified to the Regional Stage, but was eliminated by Renovación Pacífico.

== Honours ==
=== Regional ===
- Liga Departamental de Piura:

Winners (2): 2006, 2023
Runner-up (4): 1976, 2004, 2005, 2008

- Liga Provincial de Piura:

Winners (3): 1976, 2005, 2023
Runner-up (6): 2002, 2003, 2004, 2006, 2008, 2025

- Liga Distrital de La Unión:

Winners (8): 1976, 1978, 2002, 2003, 2004, 2007, 2008, 2025
Runner-up (1): 2023

== See also ==
- List of football clubs in Peru
- Peruvian football league system
