= Juventus Corazón =

Peruvian football club

- Full name: Club Juventus Corazón
- Ground: Estadio Mariano Melgar, Arequipa
- Capacity: 20,000
- League: Copa Perú
Home colours

Juventus Corazón is a Peruvian football club, playing in the city of Majes, Arequipa, Peru.

== History ==
Juventus Corazón is one of the clubs with the greatest tradition in the city of Majes, Arequipa.

In the 2004 Copa Perú, the club qualified to the National Stage but was eliminated by Unión Grauina of Apurímac.

The club was runner-up in the 2009 Liga Superior de Arequipa.

== Honours ==
=== Regional ===
- Región VII:

Winners (1): 2004

- Liga Departamental de Arequipa:

Runner-up (3): 2003, 2004, 2009

- Liga Provincial de Caylloma:

Winners (4): 2002, 2003, 2016, 2022
Runner-up (1): 2008

- Liga Superior de Arequipa:

Runner-up (1): 2009

- Liga Distrital de Majes:

Winners (3): 2002, 2003, 2016

== See also ==
- List of football clubs in Peru
- Peruvian football league system
