= 2006 Copa Perú =

Copa Perú
- Season: 2006
- Champions: Total Clean

The 2006 Copa Perú season (Spanish: Copa Perú 2006), the promotion tournament of Peruvian football.

The tournament has 5 stages. The first four stages are played as mini-league round-robin tournaments, except for third stage in region IV, which is played as a knockout stage. The final stage features two knockout rounds and a final four-team group stage to determine the two promoted teams.

The 2006 Peru Cup started with the District Stage (Spanish: Etapa Distrital) on February. The next stage was the Provincial Stage (Spanish: Etapa Provincial) which started, on June. The tournament continued with the Departamental Stage (Spanish: Etapa Departamental) on July. The Regional Staged followed. The National Stage (Spanish: Etapa Nacional) started on November. The winner and runner-up of the National Stage will be promoted to the First Division.

== Departmental Stage ==
The following list shows the teams that qualified for the Regional Stage.

Department	Team	Location
Amazonas	Asociación Amazonas	Amazonas
Amazonas	Deportivo Municipal (RdM)	Amazonas
Ancash	Academia Sipesa	Ancash
Ancash	Renovación Condorama	Ancash
Apurímac	Deportivo Educación	Abancay
Apurímac	Social Olivo	Apurímac
Arequipa	Total Clean	Arequipa
Arequipa	Senati	Arequipa
Ayacucho	Sport Huamanga	Ayacucho
Ayacucho	Deportivo Municipal (Kimbiri)	Ayacucho
Cajamarca	ADA	Cajamarca
Cajamarca	Unión Progreso	Cajamarca
Callao	Atlético Chalaco	Callao
Callao	Deportivo SIMA	Callao
Cusco	Cienciano Junior	Cusco
Cusco	Deportivo Municipal (Echarate)	Echarate
Huancavelica	Deportivo Municipal (Yauli)	Huancavelica
Huancavelica	Unión Minas Caudalosa	Huancavelica
Huánuco	León de Huánuco	Huánuco
Huánuco	Tambillo Grande	Huánuco
Ica	Sport Victoria	Pisco
Ica	Alianza Pisco	Ica
Junín	Deportivo Ingeniería	Junín
Junín	ADT	Tarma
La Libertad	Sport Vallejo	Trujillo
La Libertad	Carlos A. Mannucci	Trujillo

Department	Team	Location
Lambayeque	Boca Juniors	Ferreñafe
Lambayeque	Juan Aurich	Chiclayo
Lima	Hijos de Acosvinchos	Ate Vitarte
Lima	Jesús del Valle	Lima
Loreto	Estudiantil San Pablo	San Pablo
Loreto	CNI	Iquitos
Madre de Dios	MINSA	Puerto Maldonado
Madre de Dios	Atlético Porteño	Puerto Maldonado
Moquegua	Deportivo Enersur	Moquegua
Moquegua	Deportivo GER	Ilo
Pasco	Real Generación Aprominc	Cerro de Pasco
Pasco	Universitario (Yanacancha)	Yanacancha
Piura	Olimpia	Piura
Piura	Corazón Micaelino	Piura
Puno	Unión Carolina	Puno
Puno	UANCV	Puno
San Martín	Deportivo Comercio	San Martín
San Martín	Deportivo Cali	San Martín
Tacna	Alfonso Ugarte de Tacna	Tacna
Tacna	Mariscal Miller	Tacna
Tumbes	Sport Pampas	Tumbes
Tumbes	Defensor Arica (Tumbes)	Tumbes
Ucayali	Sport Loreto	Ucayali
Ucayali	Deportivo Hospital	Pucallpa

== Regional Stage ==
The following list shows the teams that qualified for the Regional Stage.

=== Region I ===
Region I includes qualified teams from Amazonas, Lambayeque, Tumbes and Piura region.

==== Group A ====
Pos	Team	Pld	W	D	L	GF	GA	GD	Pts	Qualification	JAU	OLU	SPP	DMM
1	Juan Aurich	6	5	1	0	26	4	+22	16	National stage		4–0	2–1	11–0
2	Olimpia	6	4	1	1	14	12	+2	13		3–3		1–0	2–0
3	Sport Pampas	6	2	0	4	7	9	−2	6		0–2	2–3		2–0
4	Deportivo Municipal (RdM)	6	0	0	6	4	24	−20	0		0–2	3–5	1–2	

Legend: Blue = home team win; Yellow = draw; Red = away team win.

==== Group B ====
Pos	Team	Pld	W	D	L	GF	GA	GD	Pts	Qualification	CMI	BJF	DAT	AMA
1	Corazón Micaelino	6	5	0	1	12	1	+11	15	National stage		6–0	1–0	3–0
2	Boca Juniors	5	3	0	2	6	8	−2	9		0–1		W.O.	3–1
3	Defensor Arica (Tumbes)	5	1	1	3	4	7	−3	4		1–0	0–2		1–1
4	Asociación Amazonas	6	1	1	4	5	11	−6	4		0–1	0–1	3–2	

Legend: Blue = home team win; Yellow = draw; Red = away team win.

==== Regional Final ====
Team 1	Agg.	Team 2	1st leg	2nd leg
Juan Aurich	2–2 (4–2 p)	Corazón Micaelino	1–0	1–2

=== Region II ===
Region II includes qualified teams from Ancash, Cajamarca, La Libertad and San Martín region.

==== Group A ====
Pos	Team	Pld	W	D	L	GF	GA	GD	Pts	Qualification	ADA	CAM	RCO	COM
1	ADA	6	4	2	0	10	4	+6	14	National stage		0–0	3–1	2–1
2	Carlos A. Mannucci	6	3	3	0	16	6	+10	12		0–0		2–2	8–1
3	Renovación Condorama	6	1	1	4	9	16	−7	4		0–2	2–3		3–1
4	Deportivo Comercio	6	1	0	5	11	20	−9	3		2–3	1–3	5–1	

Legend: Blue = home team win; Yellow = draw; Red = away team win.

==== Group B ====
Pos	Team	Pld	W	D	L	GF	GA	GD	Pts	Qualification	SPV	DCT	UPR	ASI
1	Sport Vallejo	6	4	2	0	7	1	+6	14	National stage		2–1	1–0	3–0
2	Deportivo Cali	6	2	1	3	11	8	+3	7		0–1		1–2	3–1
3	Unión Progreso	5	1	2	2	3	4	−1	5		0–0	1–1		W.O.
4	Academia Sipesa	5	1	1	3	3	11	−8	4		0–0	1–5	1–0	

Legend: Blue = home team win; Yellow = draw; Red = away team win.

=== Region III ===
Region III includes qualified teams from Loreto and Ucayali region.

Pos	Team	Pld	W	D	L	GF	GA	GD	Pts	Qualification	CNI	HOS	ESP	LOR
1	CNI	6	3	3	0	12	2	+10	12	National stage		1–1	2–0	4–0
2	Deportivo Hospital	6	2	3	1	10	8	+2	9	National stage	1–1		4–2	3–2
3	Estudiantil San Pablo	6	2	1	3	8	10	−2	7		0–0	2–1		3–1
4	Sport Loreto	6	1	1	4	5	15	−10	4		0–4	0–0	2–1	

Legend: Blue = home team win; Yellow = draw; Red = away team win.

=== Region IV ===
Region IV includes qualified teams from Lima and Callao region. This region played as a knockout cup system and the finalists qualified.

==== Semifinals ====
Team 1	Agg.	Team 2	1st leg	2nd leg
Atlético Chalaco	2–5	Hijos de Acosvinchos	2–1	0–4
Deportivo SIMA	3–7	Jesús del Valle	3–1	0–6

==== Regional Final ====
Team 1	Agg.	Team 2	1st leg	2nd leg
Hijos de Acosvinchos	3–4	Jesús del Valle	2–2	1–2

=== Region V ===
Region V includes qualified teams from Junín, Pasco and Huancavelica region.

Pos	Team	Pld	W	D	L	GF	GA	GD	Pts	Qualification	VIC	SPH	API	DMY	UMC	DMK
1	Sport Victoria	10	6	3	1	23	7	+16	21	National stage		0–0	1–1	7–0	2–0	6–0
2	Sport Huamanga	10	6	3	1	19	10	+9	21	National stage	3–0		1–0	2–2	4–1	1–0
3	Alianza Pisco	10	4	3	3	15	10	+5	15		0–2	2–0		2–1	3–0	4–0
4	Deportivo Municipal (Yauli)	10	3	3	4	18	20	−2	12		1–1	1–3	3–1		4–0	4–0
5	Unión Minas Caudalosa	9	1	3	5	9	20	−11	6		0–1	2–2	0–0	4–2		2–2
6	Deportivo Municipal (Kimbiri)	9	0	3	6	8	25	−17	3		2–3	2–3	2–2	0–0	W.O.	

Legend: Blue = home team win; Yellow = draw; Red = away team win.

=== Region VI ===
Region VI includes qualified teams from Ayacucho, Huánuco and Ica region. Two teams qualified from this stage.

==== Group A ====
Pos	Team	Pld	W	D	L	GF	GA	GD	Pts	Qualification	LEÓ	ADT	RGA
1	León de Huánuco	4	3	0	1	8	4	+4	9	National stage		1–0	2–0
2	ADT	4	2	1	1	7	4	+3	7		2–1		4–1
3	Real Generación Aprominc	4	0	1	3	4	11	−7	1		2–4	1–1	

Legend: Blue = home team win; Yellow = draw; Red = away team win.

==== Group B ====
Pos	Team	Pld	W	D	L	GF	GA	GD	Pts	Qualification	DIN	TGR	UNY
1	Deportivo Ingeniería	4	2	2	0	6	4	+2	8	National stage		3–2	1–0
2	Tambillo Grande	4	1	1	2	6	7	−1	4		1–1		3–1
3	Universitario (Yanacancha)	4	1	1	2	4	5	−1	4		1–1	2–0	

Legend: Blue = home team win; Yellow = draw; Red = away team win.

==== Regional Final ====
Team 1	Score	Team 2
León de Huánuco	4–0	Deportivo Ingeniería

=== Region VII ===
Region VII includes qualified teams from Arequipa, Moquegua and Tacna region.

==== Group A ====
Pos	Team	Pld	W	D	L	GF	GA	GD	Pts	Qualification	SEN	GER	AUT
1	Senati	4	3	1	0	15	2	+13	10	Región VII - Semifinals		2–1	5–0
2	Deportivo GER	4	1	2	1	5	4	+1	5	Región VII - Semifinals	1–1		1–1
3	Alfonso Ugarte de Tacna	4	0	1	3	1	15	−14	1		0–7	0–2	

Legend: Blue = home team win; Yellow = draw; Red = away team win.

==== Group B ====
Pos	Team	Pld	W	D	L	GF	GA	GD	Pts	Qualification	TCL	MMI	DPE
1	Total Clean	4	3	1	0	13	3	+10	10	Región VII - Semifinals		5–1	6–1
2	Mariscal Miller	4	2	0	2	5	6	−1	6	Región VII - Semifinals	0–1		3–0
3	Deportivo Enersur	4	0	1	3	2	11	−9	1		1–1	0–1	

Legend: Blue = home team win; Yellow = draw; Red = away team win.

==== Semifinals ====
Team 1	Agg.	Team 2	1st leg	2nd leg
Senati	3–2	Mariscal Miller	1–1	2–1
Deportivo GER	2–9	Total Clean	1–1	1–8

==== Regional Final ====
Team 1	Score	Team 2
Senati	1–1 (3–4 p)	Total Clean

=== Region VIII ===
Region VIII includes qualified teams from Apurímac, Cusco, Madre de Dios and Puno region.

==== First Round ====
Team 1	Agg.	Team 2	1st leg	2nd leg
Unión Carolina	7–1	Atlético Porteño	5–1	2–0
MINSA	1–4	UANCV	1–1	0–3
Deportivo Municipal (Echarate)	1–3	Social Olivo	1–1	0–2
Deportivo Educación	2–2 (a)	Cienciano Junior	1–0	1–2

==== Final Group ====
Pos	Team	Pld	W	D	L	GF	GA	GD	Pts	Qualification	UAN	DPE	UCA	SOL
1	UANCV	6	4	2	0	18	6	+12	14	National stage		3–0	2–0	8–2
2	Deportivo Educación	6	3	0	3	11	10	+1	9	National stage	1–2		5–2	1–2
3	Unión Carolina	6	1	2	3	10	11	−1	5		2–2	1–2		5–0
4	Social Olivo	6	1	2	3	5	17	−12	5		1–1	0–2	0–0	

Legend: Blue = home team win; Yellow = draw; Red = away team win.

== National Stage ==
The National Stage started in November. The winners of the National Stage will be promoted to the 2007 Torneo Descentralizado.

Round of 16
Juan Aurich	1	1	2
Sport Vallejo	0	1	1
Corazón Micaelino	3	0	3
ADA	0	0	0
Deportivo Hospital	2	1	3 (4)
Jesús del Valle	1	2	3 (2)
Hijos de Acosvinchos	0	1	1
CNI	0	1	1
Deportivo Ingeniería	0	1	1
Sport Victoria	0	1	1
Sport Huamanga	2	0	2
León de Huánuco	0	1	1
Deportivo Educación	0	2	2
Total Clean	0	3	3
Senati	4	0	4
UANCV	0	3	3

Quarterfinals
Juan Aurich	2	2	4
Corazón Micaelino	0	1	1
Deportivo Hospital	0	1	1
Hijos de Acosvinchos	3	4	7
Deportivo Ingeniería	0	2	2
Sport Huamanga	0	1	1
Total Clean	0	3	3
Senati	0	3	3

Final Group
Juan Aurich	0	1	1 (1)
Hijos de Acosvinchos	1	0	1 (3)
Deportivo Ingeniería	2	0	2
Total Clean	1	1	2

Champion & Runner-Up
Hijos de Acosvinchos	0	1	1
Total Clean	2	0	2

=== Round of 16 ===
Team 1	Agg.	Team 2	1st leg	2nd leg
Juan Aurich	2–1	Sport Vallejo	1–0	1–1
Corazón Micaelino	3–0	ADA	3–0	0–0
Deportivo Hospital	3–3 (4–2 p)	Jesús del Valle	2–1	1–2
Hijos de Acosvinchos	1–1 (a)	CNI	0–0	1–1
Deportivo Ingeniería	1–1 (a)	Sport Victoria	0–0	1–1
Sport Huamanga	2–1	León de Huánuco	2–0	0–1
Deportivo Educación	0–5	Total Clean	0–2	0–3
Senati	4–3	UANCV	4–0	0–3

=== Quarterfinals ===
Team 1	Agg.	Team 2	1st leg	2nd leg
Juan Aurich	4–1	Corazón Micaelino	2–0	2–1
Deportivo Hospital	1–7	Hijos de Acosvinchos	0–3	1–4
Sport Huamanga	1–2	Deportivo Ingeniería	0–0	1–2
Total Clean	3–3 (a)	Senati	0–0	3–3

=== Semifinals ===
Team 1	Agg.	Team 2	1st leg	2nd leg
Hijos de Acosvinchos	1–1 (3–1 p)	Juan Aurich	1–0	0–1
Deportivo Ingeniería	2–2	Total Clean	2–1	0–1

=== Final ===
Team 1	Agg.	Team 2	1st leg	2nd leg
Total Clean	2–1	Hijos de Acosvinchos	2–0	0–1
