= 2005 Copa Perú =

Peruvian football tournament

Copa Perú
- Season: 2005
- Champions: José Gálvez

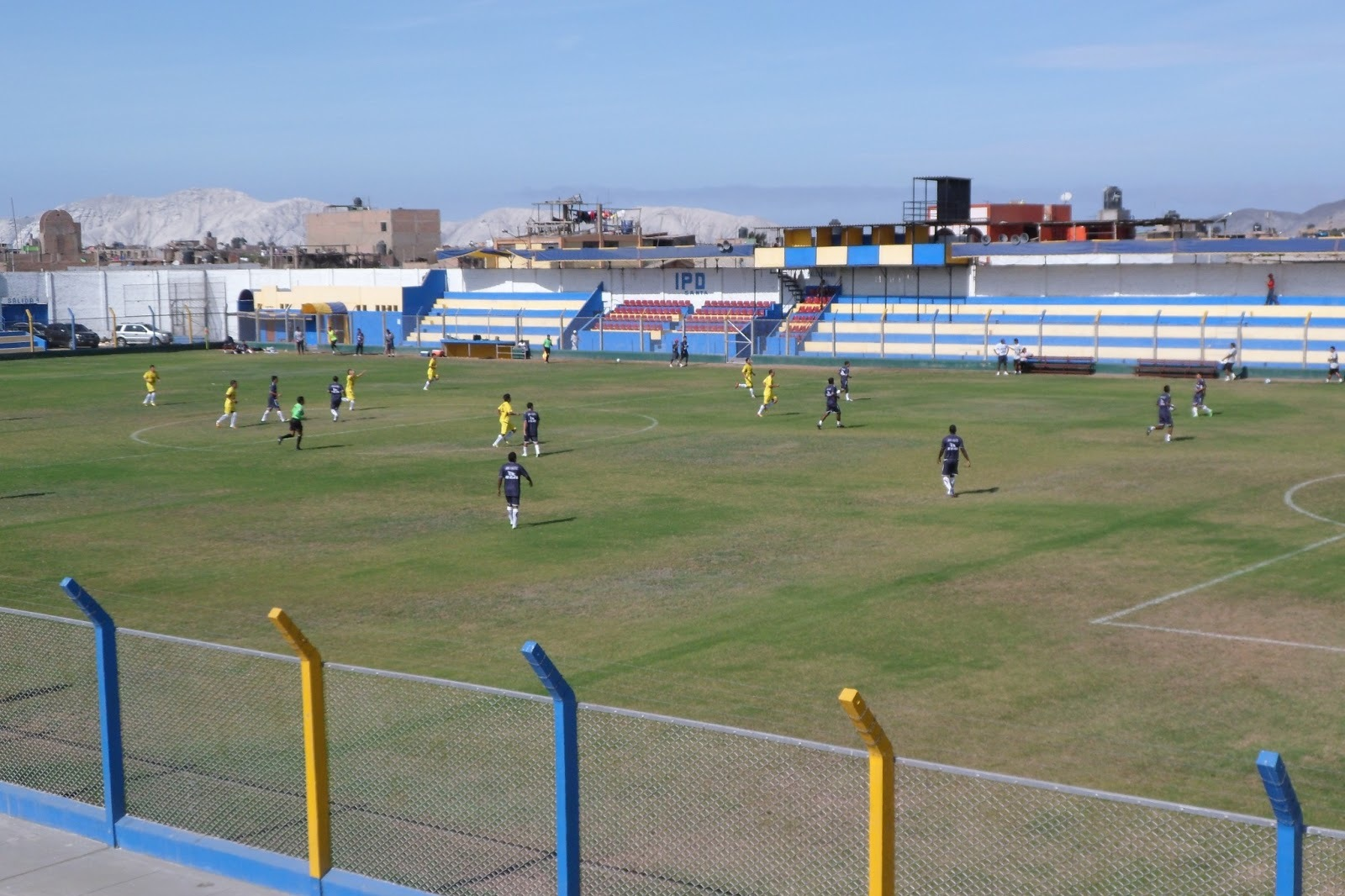
View of the Manuel Gómez Arellano Stadium in Chimbote, Peru.

The 2005 Copa Perú season (Spanish: Copa Perú 2005), the promotion tournament of Peruvian football.

The tournament has 5 stages. The first four stages are played as mini-league round-robin tournaments, except for third stage in region IV, which is played as a knockout stage. The final stage features two knockout rounds and a final four-team group stage to determine the two promoted teams.

The 2005 Peru Cup started with the District Stage (Spanish: Etapa Distrital) on February. The next stage was the Provincial Stage (Spanish: Etapa Provincial) which started, on June. The tournament continued with the Departamental Stage (Spanish: Etapa Departamental) on July. The Regional Staged followed. The National Stage (Spanish: Etapa Nacional) started on November. The winner of the National Stage will be promoted to the First Division.

== Departmental Stage ==
The following list shows the teams that qualified for the Regional Stage.

Department	Team	Location
Amazonas	Higos Urco	Amazonas
Amazonas	Sport Sealcas	Amazonas
Ancash	José Gálvez	Ancash
Ancash	Los Caballeros de la Ley	Ancash
Apurímac	Deportivo Educación	Abancay
Apurímac	José María Arguedas	Apurímac
Arequipa	Senati	Arequipa
Arequipa	Atlético Mollendo	Arequipa
Ayacucho	Deportivo Municipal (Huamanga)	Ayacucho
Ayacucho	Sport Huamanga	Ayacucho
Cajamarca	Sporting Caxamarca	Cajamarca
Cajamarca	UTC	Cajamarca
Callao	Atlético Chalaco	Callao
Callao	Juventud La Perla	Callao
Cusco	Deportivo Garcilaso	Cusco
Cusco	Estudiantes Calca	Calca
Huancavelica	Instituto Pedagógico	Huancavelica
Huancavelica	Deportivo Municipal (Acoria)	Huancavelica
Huánuco	Tambillo Grande	Huánuco
Huánuco	Señor de Puelles	Huánuco
Ica	Abraham Valdelomar	Pisco
Ica	José Carlos Mariátegui	Ica
Junín	Echa Muni	Junín
Junín	Deportivo Municipal Asociados	Junín
La Libertad	Independiente Ramón Castilla	La Libertad
La Libertad	Alianza Huamachuco	Sanchez Carrión

Department	Team	Location
Lambayeque	Boca Juniors	Ferreñafe
Lambayeque	Juan Aurich	Chiclayo
Lima	Residencial Huaral	Huaral
Lima	Atlético Minero	Matucana
Loreto	UNAP	San Pablo
Loreto	CNI	Iquitos
Madre de Dios	Fray Martín de Porres	Madre de Dios
Madre de Dios	Deportivo Maldonado	Puerto Maldonado
Moquegua	Atlético Huracán	Moquegua
Moquegua	Social Chalaca	Moquegua
Pasco	Real Generación Aprominc	Cerro de Pasco
Pasco	Universitario (Yanacancha)	Yanacancha
Piura	UDT Aviación	Piura
Piura	Olimpia	Piura
Puno	Unión Carolina	Puno
Puno	Alfonso Ugarte	Puno
San Martín	Huallaga	San Martín
San Martín	Emilio San Martín	San Martín
Segunda División	Olímpico Somos Peru	Ica
Segunda División	Deportivo Aviación	Lima
Tacna	Alfonso Ugarte de Tacna	Tacna
Tacna	Unión Alfonso Ugarte	Tacna
Tumbes	Sporting Pizarro	Tumbes
Tumbes	UD Chulucanas	Tumbes
Ucayali	UNU	Ucayali
Ucayali	Deportivo Hospital	Pucallpa

== Regional Stage ==
The following list shows the teams that qualified for the Regional Stage.

=== Region I ===
Region I includes qualified teams from Amazonas, Lambayeque, Tumbes and Piura region.

==== Group A ====
Pos	Team	Pld	W	D	L	GF	GA	GD	Pts	Qualification	BJF	SPP	UDT	SPS
1	Boca Juniors	6	3	2	1	13	4	+9	11	National stage		2–0	2–1	7–0
2	Sporting Pizarro	6	3	2	1	5	4	+1	11		1–0		1–0	1–0
3	UDT Aviación	6	1	2	3	5	6	−1	5		1–1	1–1		2–0
4	Sport Sealcas	6	1	2	3	4	12	−8	5		1–1	1–1	2–0	

Legend: Blue = home team win; Yellow = draw; Red = away team win.

==== Group B ====
Pos	Team	Pld	W	D	L	GF	GA	GD	Pts	Qualification	OLU	JAU	UDC	HUC
1	Olimpia	6	4	1	1	16	6	+10	13	National stage		2–1	5–0	4–1
2	Juan Aurich	6	3	1	2	13	8	+5	10		2–1		1–2	5–1
3	UD Chulucanas	6	2	3	1	8	9	−1	9		2–2	1–1		3–0
4	Higos Urco	6	0	1	5	3	17	−14	1		0–2	1–3	0–0	

Legend: Blue = home team win; Yellow = draw; Red = away team win.

==== Regional Final ====
Team 1	Score	Team 2
Olimpia	2–1	Boca Juniors

=== Region II ===
Region II includes qualified teams from Ancash, Cajamarca, La Libertad and San Martín region.

==== Group A ====
Pos	Team	Pld	W	D	L	GF	GA	GD	Pts	Qualification	GAL	HUA	IRC	SPC
1	José Gálvez	6	4	1	1	12	4	+8	13	National stage		2–0	2–0	5–1
2	Huallaga	6	3	1	2	9	6	+3	10		1–1		4–2	2–0
3	Independiente Ramón Castilla	5	1	1	3	7	11	−4	4		3–1	0–2		W.O.
4	Sporting Caxamarca	5	1	1	3	5	12	−7	4		0–2	2–1	2–2	

Legend: Blue = home team win; Yellow = draw; Red = away team win.

==== Group B ====
Pos	Team	Pld	W	D	L	GF	GA	GD	Pts	Qualification	UTC	LCL	ESM	AHU
1	UTC	6	5	1	0	10	1	+9	16	National stage		1–0	3–1	2–0
2	Los Caballeros de la Ley	6	1	3	2	6	5	+1	6		0–0		0–0	5–1
3	Emilio San Martín	5	1	1	3	4	6	−2	4		0–1	2–0		1–2
4	Alianza Huamachuco	5	1	1	3	4	12	−8	4		0–3	1–1	W.O.	

Legend: Blue = home team win; Yellow = draw; Red = away team win.

==== Regional Final ====
Team 1	Score	Team 2
UTC	1–0	José Gálvez

=== Region III ===
Pos	Team	Pld	W	D	L	GF	GA	GD	Pts	Qualification	OAM	DAV	DMU	USM	LPS	CRI	AME	DVM	AELU	VCH	CMP	DSA
1	Olímpico Somos Perú	22	13	7	2	52	22	+30	46	National stage		1–4	0–1	2–1	2–0	1–1	1–0	4–1	7–0	3–3	3–1	2–0
2	Aviación-Coopsol	22	11	9	2	41	21	+20	42	National stage	1–4		1–1	1–1	0–0	5–3	0–0	1–0	1–1	1–0	2–2	4–0
3	Deportivo Municipal	22	12	5	5	45	25	+20	41		0–4	0–3		1–0	1–0	2–1	1–1	2–1	1–1	4–2	1–1	6–0
4	Universidad San Marcos	22	11	6	5	30	20	+10	39		4–4	1–2	1–1		2–0	1–0	0–0	1–2	1–0	1–0	1–0	4–0
5	La Peña Sporting	22	10	6	6	25	20	+5	36		0–2	3–0	1–2	3–3		2–1	1–0	2–2	0–0	2–1	0–0	2–2
6	Sporting Cristal B (Note: Sporting Cristal B can´t be promoted as they are the "reserve team" of Sporting Cristal which plays in First Division.)	22	10	5	7	28	22	+6	35		0–2	0–1	0–3	0–0	1–0		2–2	3–0	3–0	0–0	3–1	1–0
7	América Cochahuayco	22	6	10	6	28	20	+8	28		1–1	1–1	4–1	2–0	1–2	0–1		5–1	0–0	2–0	1–1	3–0
8	Defensor Villa del Mar	22	6	7	9	27	37	−10	25		0–0	1–1	1–5	1–2	0–1	2–3	0–0		1–1	1–0	2–0	2–1
9	AELU	22	4	10	8	13	29	−16	22		0–0	0–4	1–0	0–1	0–2	0–0	3–1	0–0		1–0	0–2	1–1
10	Virgen de Chapi	22	5	4	13	26	34	−8	19		3–4	1–2	1–0	1–3	0–2	0–1	3–1	2–2	2–2		3–0	1–0
11	Unión de Campeones	22	4	7	11	17	34	−17	19		0–0	1–1	1–6	0–1	0–1	0–2	1–1	1–3	0–2	2–0		1–0
12	Somos Aduanas	22	1	2	19	10	58	−48	5		1–5	0–5	0–6	0–1	0–1	0–2	0–2	2–4	2–0	0–3	1–2	

Updated to match(es) played on 2005. Source:
Legend: Blue = home team win; Yellow = draw; Red = away team win.
Rules for classification: 1) points; 2) goal difference; 3) number of goals scored.

=== Region IV ===
Region IV includes qualified teams from Lima, Loreto, Callao and Ucayali region.

==== Group A ====
Pos	Team	Pld	W	D	L	GF	GA	GD	Pts	Qualification	CNI	UNA	HOS	UNU
1	CNI	6	4	2	0	12	3	+9	14	National stage		1–1	2–2	4–0
2	UNAP	6	3	1	2	13	7	+6	10		0–1		5–1	4–0
3	Deportivo Hospital	5	2	1	2	7	11	−4	7		0–3	3–1		W.O.
4	UNU	5	0	0	5	1	12	−11	0		0–1	1–2	0–1	

Legend: Blue = home team win; Yellow = draw; Red = away team win.

==== Group B ====
===== Semifinals =====
Team 1	Agg.	Team 2	1st leg	2nd leg
Atlético Minero	3–0	Juventud La Perla	1–0	2–0
Residencial Huaral	4–3	Atlético Chalaco	2–2	2–1

===== Final =====
Team 1	Agg.	Team 2	1st leg	2nd leg
Atlético Minero	2–0	Residencial Huaral	0–0	2–0

=== Region V ===
Region V includes qualified teams from Ayacucho, Huancavelica and Ica region.

Pos	Team	Pld	W	D	L	GF	GA	GD	Pts	Qualification	AVI	SPH	JCM	DMH	IPH	DMA
1	Abraham Valdelomar	10	7	1	2	14	7	+7	22	National stage		2–1	1–0	1–0	3–1	3–1
2	Sport Huamanga	10	7	0	3	18	9	+9	21	National stage	2–1		2–1	3–0	4–0	2–0
3	José Carlos Mariátegui	10	4	2	4	13	9	+4	14		0–1	1–0		1–1	5–1	3–1
4	Deportivo Municipal (Huamanga)	10	3	3	4	10	10	0	12		0–1	0–1	0–0		2–0	4–1
5	Instituto Pedagógico	10	4	0	6	9	23	−14	12		2–1	2–0	2–1	0–1		1–0
6	Deportivo Municipal (Acoria)	10	1	2	7	13	19	−6	5		0–0	2–3	0–1	2–2	6–0	

Legend: Blue = home team win; Yellow = draw; Red = away team win.

=== Region VI ===
Region VI includes qualified teams from Huanuco, Junin and Pasco region. Two teams qualified from this stage.

==== Group A ====
Pos	Team	Pld	W	D	L	GF	GA	GD	Pts	Qualification	SPH	UNY	DMA
1	Señor de Puelles	4	2	1	1	6	5	+1	7	Región VI - Semifinals		1–1	1–0
2	Universitario (Yanacancha)	4	1	2	1	4	5	−1	5	Región VI - Semifinals	1–3		2–1
3	Deportivo Municipal Asociados	4	1	1	2	4	4	0	4		3–1	0–0	

Legend: Blue = home team win; Yellow = draw; Red = away team win.

==== Group B ====
Pos	Team	Pld	W	D	L	GF	GA	GD	Pts	Qualification	EMJ	TGR	RGA
1	Echa Muni	4	2	2	0	8	1	+7	8	Región VI - Semifinals		3–0	5–1
2	Tambillo Grande	4	2	1	1	5	5	0	7	Región VI - Semifinals	0–0		3–1
3	Real Generación Aprominc	4	0	1	3	3	10	−7	1		0–0	1–2	

Legend: Blue = home team win; Yellow = draw; Red = away team win.

===== Semifinals =====
Team 1	Agg.	Team 2	1st leg	2nd leg
Echa Muni	0–2	Universitario (Yanacancha)	0–0	0–2
Tambillo Grande	2–4	Señor de Puelles	1–0	1–4

====== Tiebreaker ======
Team 1	Score	Team 2
Tambillo Grande	1–0	Señor de Puelles

===== Regional Final =====
Team 1	Agg.	Team 2	1st leg	2nd leg
Tambillo Grande	2–1 (2–3 p)	Universitario (Yanacancha)	2–0	0–1

=== Region VII ===
Region VII includes qualified teams from Arequipa, Moquegua and Tacna region.

==== Group A ====
Pos	Team	Pld	W	D	L	GF	GA	GD	Pts	Qualification	SEN	SCH	AUT
1	Senati	4	2	1	1	6	5	+1	7	Región VII - Semifinals		2–0	1–1
2	Social Chalaca	4	2	0	2	6	5	+1	6	Región VII - Semifinals	1–3		4–0
3	Alfonso Ugarte de Tacna	4	1	1	2	4	6	−2	4		3–0	0–1	

Legend: Blue = home team win; Yellow = draw; Red = away team win.

==== Group B ====
Pos	Team	Pld	W	D	L	GF	GA	GD	Pts	Qualification	MOL	UAU	HUR
1	Atlético Mollendo	4	3	1	0	16	3	+13	10	Región VII - Semifinals		0–0	5–1
2	Unión Alfonso Ugarte	4	1	2	1	5	6	−1	5	Región VII - Semifinals	1–3		3–3
3	Atlético Huracán	4	0	1	3	5	17	−12	1		1–8	0–1	

Legend: Blue = home team win; Yellow = draw; Red = away team win.

==== Semifinals ====
Team 1	Agg.	Team 2	1st leg	2nd leg
Social Chalaca	1–2	Atlético Mollendo	0–0	1–2
Unión Alfonso Ugarte	1–5	Senati	0–2	1–3

=== Region VIII ===
Region VIII includes qualified teams from Apurímac, Cusco, Madre de Dios and Puno region.

==== Group A ====
Pos	Team	Pld	W	D	L	GF	GA	GD	Pts	Qualification	JMA	ALF	ECA	MLD
1	José María Arguedas	6	4	1	1	6	3	+3	13	Región VIII - Semifinals		1–0	3–2	1–0
2	Alfonso Ugarte	6	3	1	2	7	5	+2	10	Región VIII - Semifinals	0–0		2–0	3–2
3	Estudiantes Calca	6	2	0	4	8	10	−2	6		0–1	2–1		3–1
4	Deportivo Maldonado	6	2	0	4	6	9	−3	6		1–0	0–1	2–1	

Legend: Blue = home team win; Yellow = draw; Red = away team win.

==== Group B ====
Pos	Team	Pld	W	D	L	GF	GA	GD	Pts	Qualification	UCA	DPE	DPG	FMP
1	Unión Carolina	6	4	2	0	8	3	+5	14	Región VIII - Semifinals		2–0	2–1	1–0
2	Deportivo Educación	6	3	1	2	16	8	+8	10	Región VIII - Semifinals	1–1		1–0	10–0
3	Deportivo Garcilaso	6	2	1	3	9	5	+4	7		0–1	3–1		5–0
4	Fray Martín de Porres	6	0	2	4	3	20	−17	2		1–1	2–3	0–0	

Legend: Blue = home team win; Yellow = draw; Red = away team win.

==== Semifinals ====
Team 1	Agg.	Team 2	1st leg	2nd leg
Jose Maria Arguedas	0–2	Deportivo Educación	0–1	0–1
Alfonso Ugarte	0–0	Unión Carolina	0–0	0–0

===== Tiebreaker =====
Team 1	Score	Team 2
Unión Carolina	0–0 (5–3 p)	Alfonso Ugarte

==== Regional Final ====
Team 1	Score	Team 2
Deportivo Educación	1–0	Unión Carolina

== National Stage ==
The National Stage started in November. The winners of the National Stage was promoted to the 2006 Torneo Descentralizado.

Round of 16
José Gálvez	1	2	3
Olimpia	1	1	2
Boca Juniors	1	1	2
UTC	0	2	2
Olímpico Somos Perú	2	1	3
CNI	0	3	3
Atlético Minero	1	2	3
Aviación-Coopsol	1	1	2
Tambillo Grande	4	2	6
Abraham Valdelomar	0	2	2
Sport Huamanga	2	0	2
Universitario (Y)	1	3	4
Unión Carolina	1	1	2
Senati	3	0	3
Deportivo Educación	2	0	2
Atlético Mollendo	0	1	1

Quarterfinals
José Gálvez	1	2	3
Boca Juniors	1	1	2
Olímpico Somos Perú	2	1	3
Atlético Minero	3	1	4
Tambillo Grande	2	1	3
Universitario (Y)	1	1	2
Senati	1	2	3
Deportivo Educación	1	0	1

Final Group
José Gálvez	1	3	4
Atlético Minero	1	2	3
Tambillo Grande	2	0	2
Senati	2	2	4

Champion & Runner-Up
José Gálvez	2	4	6
Senati	3	1	4

=== Round of 16 ===
Team 1	Agg.	Team 2	1st leg	2nd leg
Olimpia	2–3	José Gálvez	1–1	1–2
Boca Juniors	2–2 (a)	UTC	1–0	1–2
Olímpico Somos Perú	3–3 (a)	CNI	2–0	1–3
Aviación-Coopsol	2–3	Atlético Minero	1–1	1–2
Tambillo Grande	6–2	Abraham Valdelomar	4–0	2–2
Sport Huamanga	2–4	Universitario (Yanacancha)	2–1	0–3
Senati	3–2	Unión Carolina	3–1	0–1
Deportivo Educación	2–1	Atlético Mollendo	2–0	0–1

=== Quarterfinals ===
Team 1	Agg.	Team 2	1st leg	2nd leg
José Gálvez	3–2	Boca Juniors	1–1	2–1
Atlético Minero	4–3	Olímpico Somos Perú	3–2	1–1
Tambillo Grande	3–2	Universitario (Yanacancha)	2–1	1–1
Deportivo Educación	1–3	Senati	1–1	0–2

=== Semifinals ===
Team 1	Agg.	Team 2	1st leg	2nd leg
Atlético Minero	3–4	José Gálvez	1–1	2–3
Tambillo Grande	2–4	Senati	2–2	0–2

=== Final ===
Team 1	Agg.	Team 2	1st leg	2nd leg
Senati	4–6	José Gálvez	3–2	1–4

== See also ==
- 2005 Torneo Descentralizado
- 2005 Peruvian Segunda División
