= 2005 Torneo Descentralizado =

Torneo Descentralizado
- Season: 2005
- Dates: 5 March 2005 – 21 December 2005
- Champions: Sporting Cristal; 15th Primera División title
- Runner up: Cienciano
- Relegated: U. César Vallejo; Atlético Universidad
- Copa Libertadores: Sporting Cristal; Cienciano; Universitario
- Copa Sudamericana: Coronel Bolognesi; Universidad San Martín
- Top goalscorer: Miguel Mostto (18 goals)

The 2005 Torneo Descentralizado (known as the Copa Cable Mágico for sponsorship reasons) was the eighty-ninth season of Peruvian football. A total of 12 teams competed in the tournament. Sporting Cristal won its fifteenth Primera División title after beating Cienciano in the season final.

The season started on March 5, 2005, ended on December 21, 2005.

== Changes from 2004 ==
=== Structural changes ===
Starting with the 2004 season, the two relegated teams will be able to choose to play in the Segunda División or drop to their regional league as the Segunda División will now be played with non-capital teams. The number of first division teams dropped from 14 to 13.

=== Promotion and relegation ===
Deportivo Wanka and Grau–Estudiantes finished the 2004 season in 13th and 14th place, respectively, on the three-season average table and thus were relegated to their regional league. They were replaced by the champion of the 2004 Copa Perú Sport Áncash.

=== Team changes ===
Promoted from 2004 Copa Perú	Relegated from 2004 Primera División
▲ Sport Áncash (1st)	▼ Deportivo Wanka (13th) ▼ Grau–Estudiantes (14th)

== Teams ==
Locations of the 2005 Primera División teams

Team	City	Stadium	Capacity
Alianza Atlético	Sullana	Campeones del 36	8,000
Alianza Lima	Lima	Alejandro Villanueva	35,000
Atlético Universidad	Arequipa	Virgen de Chapi	45,000
Cienciano	Cusco	Garcilaso	42,056
Coronel Bolognesi	Tacna	Jorge Basadre	19,850
Melgar	Arequipa	Mariano Melgar	20,000
Sport Áncash	Huaraz	Rosas Pampa	8,000
Sport Boys	Callao	Miguel Grau	15,000
Sporting Cristal	Lima	San Martín de Porres	18,000
Unión Huaral	Huaral	Julio Lores Colan	10,000
Universidad César Vallejo	Trujillo	Mansiche	24,000
Universidad San Martín	Lima	Nacional	18,000
Universitario	Lima	Monumental	80,093

== Torneo Apertura ==
=== Standings ===
Pos	Team	Pld	W	D	L	GF	GA	GD	Pts	Qualification
1	Cienciano	24	16	3	5	37	21	+16	51	2006 Copa Libertadores Second Stage
2	Universitario	24	13	9	2	40	20	+20	48	
3	Alianza Lima	24	9	11	4	43	25	+18	38	
4	Sporting Cristal	24	9	9	6	34	28	+6	36	
5	Coronel Bolognesi	24	8	11	5	25	20	+5	35	
6	Sport Áncash	24	10	4	10	28	33	−5	34	
7	Universidad San Martín	24	8	7	9	28	26	+2	31	
8	Sport Boys	24	8	7	9	31	34	−3	31	
9	Melgar	24	7	6	11	32	42	−10	27	
10	Atlético Universidad	24	5	8	11	26	40	−14	23	
11	Universidad César Vallejo	24	4	10	10	27	36	−9	22	
12	Unión Huaral	24	4	9	11	24	32	−8	21	
13	Alianza Atlético	24	3	10	11	29	47	−18	19	

Updated to match(es) played on May 2, 2005. Source: Peruvian Football Apertura 2005
Rules for classification: 1) points; 2) goal difference; 3) number of goals scored.

=== Results ===
Home \ Away	AAS	ALI	AUN	CIE	BOL	MEL	ÁNC	SBA	CRI	HUA	UCV	USM	UNI
Alianza Atlético		0–2	5–1	1–1	0–1	1–1	1–1	0–3	1–3	1–1	2–2	0–2	0–1
Alianza Lima	5–0		1–1	6–2	0–0	0–1	4–0	2–1	2–0	0–0	3–1	1–1	0–0
Atlético Universidad	1–0	0–1		1–1	1–0	0–0	1–0	2–2	1–2	0–0	2–2	1–0	1–1
Cienciano	4–1	3–1	4–3		2–1	1–0	1–0	3–0	2–0	1–0	3–0	1–0	2–0
Coronel Bolognesi	0–0	2–2	2–1	0–0		3–1	2–1	1–1	0–0	0–2	1–1	2–0	0–0
Melgar	2–3	2–6	1–1	0–1	2–0		3–2	2–1	1–1	2–2	3–2	3–0	0–2
Sport Áncash	3–2	4–1	2–1	2–1	2–1	3–2		1–0	0–1	2–1	1–0	2–1	0–0
Sport Boys	2–2	1–0	1–0	1–0	0–2	2–1	4–0		1–1	2–1	2–1	1–1	1–1
Sporting Cristal	1–1	1–1	2–0	1–2	1–2	3–3	2–0	4–1		3–2	1–1	1–1	2–2
Unión Huaral	2–3	1–1	2–3	0–1	1–1	0–1	0–0	1–0	1–2		2–2	1–2	1–1
Universidad César Vallejo	3–3	1–1	3–2	0–1	0–2	2–0	1–1	1–1	1–0	3–0		0–0	0–2
Universidad San Martín	0–0	1–1	5–0	2–0	1–1	2–1	1–0	3–2	1–2	0–1	2–0		1–3
Universitario	5–2	2–2	3–2	1–0	1–1	4–0	2–1	4–1	1–0	1–2	1–0	2–1	

Updated to match(es) played on 2005. Source:
Legend: Blue = home team win; Yellow = draw; Red = away team win.

== Torneo Clausura ==
=== Standings ===
Pos	Team	Pld	W	D	L	GF	GA	GD	Pts	Qualification
1	Sporting Cristal	24	15	7	2	37	13	+24	52	2006 Copa Libertadores Second Stage
2	Universidad San Martín	24	14	6	4	40	20	+20	48	
3	Coronel Bolognesi	24	14	2	8	38	32	+6	44	
4	Universitario	24	11	7	6	31	20	+11	40	
5	Cienciano	24	9	6	9	33	30	+3	33	
6	Sport Áncash	24	9	5	10	27	32	−5	32	
7	Melgar	24	9	5	10	26	37	−11	32	
8	Atlético Universidad	24	9	4	11	35	39	−4	31	
9	Alianza Atlético	24	9	3	12	29	39	−10	30	
10	Sport Boys	24	7	7	10	23	30	−7	28	
11	Alianza Lima	24	7	5	12	26	23	+3	26	
12	Universidad César Vallejo	24	5	7	12	31	39	−8	22	
13	Unión Huaral	24	4	4	16	16	38	−22	16	

Updated to match(es) played on November, 2005. Source: Peruvian Football Clausura 2005
Rules for classification: 1) points; 2) goal difference; 3) number of goals scored.

=== Results ===
Home \ Away	AAS	ALI	AUN	CIE	BOL	MEL	ÁNC	SBA	CRI	HUA	UCV	USM	UNI
Alianza Atlético		2–1	3–1	1–0	1–2	1–0	2–2	4–3	0–0	1–0	4–2	1–4	0–1
Alianza Lima	4–1		3–3	2–0	1–2	1–0	3–0	2–0	0–0	0–1	0–1	0–0	0–0
Atlético Universidad	2–1	1–0		0–0	2–3	0–3	2–0	2–0	1–2	2–0	3–3	3–1	3–1
Cienciano	3–1	2–1	3–1		0–1	4–0	1–2	5–1	3–0	2–1	3–2	2–2	1–1
Coronel Bolognesi	2–0	3–2	1–2	2–1		3–0	1–3	2–2	1–2	2–2	2–1	1–2	0–2
Melgar	2–0	2–0	1–0	3–0	0–1		0–0	1–0	0–2	3–1	2–1	0–2	1–1
Sport Áncash	1–0	1–0	3–2	0–1	3–1	2–2		2–0	0–0	2–0	1–0	0–1	1–2
Sport Boys	0–0	1–0	2–2	1–1	1–0	4–1	2–0		0–1	1–0	3–2	0–2	0–0
Sporting Cristal	5–1	0–0	2–0	1–0	2–0	4–0	3–1	0–0		2–0	1–1	2–2	2–1
Unión Huaral	0–2	0–2	1–2	0–0	1–2	1–1	2–1	0–2	0–1		2–1	0–2	2–3
Universidad César Vallejo	2–3	1–0	3–0	1–1	1–2	1–2	2–2	0–0	1–4	0–1		2–1	1–0
Universidad San Martín	1–0	0–3	2–1	2–0	0–2	7–1	4–0	1–0	1–0	1–1	0–0		1–0
Universitario	1–0	2–1	1–0	4–0	1–2	1–1	1–0	2–0	0–1	3–0	2–2	1–1	

Updated to match(es) played on 2005. Source:
Legend: Blue = home team win; Yellow = draw; Red = away team win.

== Final ==
21 December 2005
20:30
Final

Cienciano	0–1	Sporting Cristal
	Report	45' Carlos Zegarra

Estadio Virgen de Chapi, Arequipa
Referee: Manuel Garay

== Aggregate table ==
Pos	Team	Pld	W	D	L	GF	GA	GD	Pts	Qualification or relegation
1	Universitario	48	24	16	8	71	40	+31	88	2006 Copa Libertadores First Stage
2	Sporting Cristal (C)	48	24	16	8	71	41	+30	88	2006 Copa Libertadores Second Stage
3	Cienciano	48	25	9	14	70	51	+19	84	2006 Copa Libertadores Second Stage
4	Universidad San Martín	48	22	13	13	68	46	+22	79	2006 Copa Sudamericana Preliminary Round
5	Coronel Bolognesi	48	22	13	13	63	52	+11	79	2006 Copa Sudamericana Preliminary Round
6	Sport Áncash	48	19	9	20	55	65	−10	66	
7	Alianza Lima	48	16	16	16	69	48	+21	64	
8	Sport Boys	48	15	14	19	54	64	−10	59	
9	Melgar	48	16	11	21	58	79	−21	59	
10	Atlético Universidad	48	14	12	22	61	79	−18	54	
11	Alianza Atlético	48	12	13	23	58	86	−28	49	
12	Universidad César Vallejo	48	9	17	22	58	75	−17	44	
13	Unión Huaral	48	8	13	27	40	70	−30	37	

Updated to match(es) played on December 2005. Source:
Rules for classification: 1) points; 2) goal difference; 3) number of goals scored.
(C) Champions

== Relegation table ==
Pos	Team	2003 Pts	2004 Pts	2005 Pts	Total Pts	Total Pld	Avg	Relegation
1	Sporting Cristal	76	95	88	259	137	1.891	
2	Alianza Lima	80	99	64	243	137	1.774	
3	Cienciano	49	101	84	234	136	1.721	
4	Universitario	41	84	88	213	137	1.555	
5	Alianza Atlético	58	92	49	202	137	1.474	
6	Coronel Bolognesi	60	60	79	198	137	1.445	
7	Sport Áncash	—	—	66	66	48	1.417	
8	Universidad San Martín	—	57	79	136	100	1.36	
9	Sport Boys	58	62	59	185	137	1.35	
10	Melgar	44	62	59	169	137	1.234	
11	Unión Huaral	50	75	37	168	137	1.226	
12	Universidad César Vallejo (R)	—	63	44	106	100	1.06	Relegation to 2006 Segunda División
13	Atlético Universidad (R)	33	57	54	143	136	1.051	Relegation to 2006 Segunda División

Updated as of games played on December, 2005.

== Top scorers ==
18 goals

- (Peru) Miguel Mostto (Cienciano)

17 goals

- (Argentina) Sergio Ibarra (Cienciano)
- (Argentina) Roberto Demus (Coronel Bolognesi)

16 goals

- (Peru) Paul Cominges (Atlético Universidad)

15 goals

- (Peru) Hernán Rengifo (U. San Martín)

== See also ==
- 2005 Peruvian Segunda División
- 2005 Copa Perú
