= Jordan Petrov =

Bulgarian footballer

Jordan Petrov is a Bulgarian former footballer who played as a striker.

== Early life ==
Petrov studied engineering.

== Career ==
Petrov played for Peruvian side Alianza, where he was described as "despite scoring nine goals, he was harshly criticized for his poor performance".

== Style of play ==
Petrov mainly operated as a striker and was known for his height. He was also known for his powerful shooting ability.

== Personal life ==
After retiring from professional football, Petrov worked in the gambling industry.
