= 2003 Copa Perú =

Copa Perú
- Season: 2003
- Champions: Universidad César Vallejo

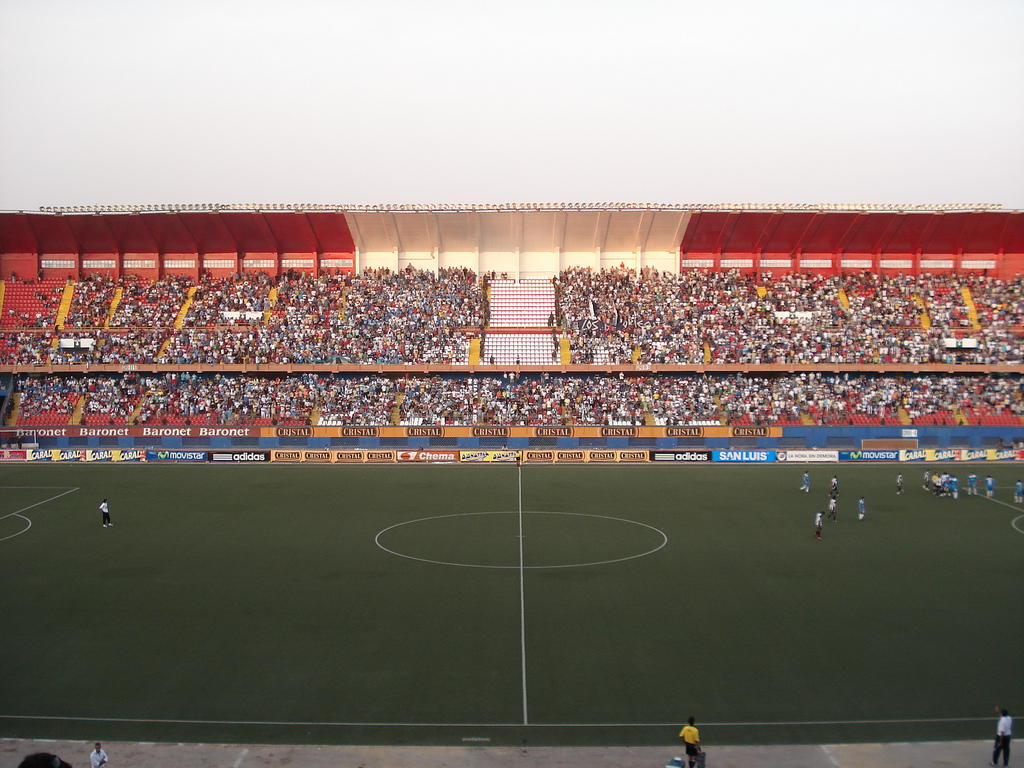

The 2003 Copa Perú season (Spanish: Copa Perú 2003), the promotion tournament of Peruvian football.

The tournament has 5 stages. The first four stages are played as mini-league round-robin tournaments, except for third stage in region IV, which is played as a knockout stage. The final stage features two knockout rounds and a final four-team group stage to determine the two promoted teams.

The 2003 Peru Cup started with the District Stage (Spanish: Etapa Distrital) on February. The next stage was the Provincial Stage (Spanish: Etapa Provincial) which started, on June. The tournament continued with the Departamental Stage (Spanish: Etapa Departamental) on July. The Regional Staged followed. The National Stage (Spanish: Etapa Nacional) started on November. The winner of the National Stage will be promoted to the First Division.

== Departmental Stage ==
The following list shows the teams that qualified for the Regional Stage.

Department	Team	Location
Amazonas	Banco de la Nación	Chachapoyas
Ancash	José Gálvez	Chimbote
Apurímac	Deportivo Educación	Abancay
Arequipa	Sportivo Huracán	Arequipa
Ayacucho	Juventud Gloria	Ayacucho
Cajamarca	UTC	Cajamarca
Callao	Defensor Mórrope	Callao
Cusco	Deportivo Garcilaso	Cusco
Huancavelica	Diablos Rojos	Huancavelica
Huánuco	León de Huánuco	Huánuco
Ica	Abraham Valdelomar	Ica
Junín	Echa Muni	Junín
La Libertad	Universidad César Vallejo	Trujillo
La Libertad	Coopsol Trujillo	Trujillo

Department	Team	Location
Lambayeque	Flamengo	Chiclayo
Lambayeque	Juan Aurich	Chiclayo
Lima	Nicolás de Piérola	Huacho
Loreto	UNAP	Iquitos
Madre de Dios	Atlético Porteño	Madre de Dios
Moquegua	Deportivo Enersur	Moquegua
Pasco	Columna San Juan	Pasco
Piura	Atlético Grau	Piura
Puno	Franciscano San Román	Puno
San Martín	Deportivo Pesquero	Moyobamba
Tacna	Mariscal Miller	Tacna
Tumbes	Sporting Pizarro	Tumbes
Ucayali	San Juan	Ucayali

== Regional Stage ==
=== Region I ===
Region I includes qualified teams from Amazonas, Lambayeque, Tumbes and Piura region.

==== Group A ====
Team 1	Agg.	Team 2	1st leg	2nd leg
Atlético Grau	3–2	Sporting Pizarro	3–1	0–1

===== Tiebreaker =====
Team 1	Score	Team 2
Atlético Grau	1–0	Sporting Pizarro

==== Group B ====
Pos	Team	Pld	W	D	L	GF	GA	GD	Pts	Qualification	FLC	JAU	BLN
1	Flamengo	4	4	0	0	9	2	+7	12	National stage		2–0	5–1
2	Juan Aurich	4	1	0	3	3	3	0	3		0–2		3–0
3	Banco de la Nación	4	1	0	3	3	10	−7	3		1–2	1–0	

Legend: Blue = home team win; Yellow = draw; Red = away team win.

==== Regional Final ====
Team 1	Agg.	Team 2	1st leg	2nd leg
Atlético Grau	1–2	Flamengo	1–1	0–1

=== Region II ===
Region II includes qualified teams from Ancash, Cajamarca and La Libertad region.

Pos	Team	Pld	W	D	L	GF	GA	GD	Pts	Qualification	UCV	UTC	GAL	CTR
1	Universidad César Vallejo	6	4	1	1	10	5	+5	13	National stage		1–0	1–0	4–1
2	UTC	6	3	0	3	7	6	+1	9		1–3		2–0	2–0
3	José Gálvez	6	2	2	2	9	6	+3	8		1–1	1–0		5–0
4	Coopsol Trujillo	6	1	1	4	6	15	−9	4		2–0	1–2	2–2	

Legend: Blue = home team win; Yellow = draw; Red = away team win.

=== Region III ===
Region III includes qualified teams from Loreto, San Martín and Ucayali region.

Pos	Team	Pld	W	D	L	GF	GA	GD	Pts	Qualification	UNA	SJP	DPM
1	UNAP	4	2	1	1	5	4	+1	7	National stage		1–0	2–1
2	San Juan	4	1	2	1	3	3	0	5		1–1		1–0
3	Deportivo Pesquero	4	1	1	2	4	5	−1	4		2–1	1–1	

Legend: Blue = home team win; Yellow = draw; Red = away team win.

=== Region IV ===
Region IV includes qualified teams from Callao, Ica and Lima region.

Pos	Team	Pld	W	D	L	GF	GA	GD	Pts	Qualification	AVI	NPH	DPM
1	Abraham Valdelomar	4	3	1	0	8	2	+6	10	National stage		3–2	3–0
2	Nicolás de Piérola	4	1	2	1	4	3	+1	5		0–0		0–0
3	Defensor Mórrope	4	0	1	3	0	7	−7	1		0–2	0–2	

Legend: Blue = home team win; Yellow = draw; Red = away team win.

=== Region V ===
Region V includes qualified teams from Huánuco, Junín and Pasco region.

Pos	Team	Pld	W	D	L	GF	GA	GD	Pts	Qualification	EMJ	CSJ	LEÓ
1	Echa Muni	4	2	1	1	6	4	+2	7	National stage		2–0	2–0
2	Columna San Juan	4	1	2	1	4	4	0	5		2–2		2–0
3	León de Huánuco	4	1	1	2	2	4	−2	4		2–0	0–0	

Legend: Blue = home team win; Yellow = draw; Red = away team win.

=== Region VI ===
Region VI includes qualified teams from Apurímac, Ayacucho and Huancavelica region.

Pos	Team	Pld	W	D	L	GF	GA	GD	Pts	Qualification	DPE	JGA	DRH
1	Deportivo Educación	3	2	1	0	6	3	+3	7	National stage		4–2	W.O.
2	Juventud Gloria	4	2	0	2	10	6	+4	6		0–1		4–1
3	Diablos Rojos	3	0	1	2	2	9	−7	1		1–1	0–4	

Legend: Blue = home team win; Yellow = draw; Red = away team win.

=== Region VII ===
Region VII includes qualified teams from Cusco, Madre de Dios and Puno region.

Pos	Team	Pld	W	D	L	GF	GA	GD	Pts	Qualification	DPG	FSR	POR
1	Deportivo Garcilaso	5	3	1	1	5	3	+2	10	National stage		1–0	1–0
2	Franciscano San Román	5	2	1	2	12	5	+7	7		0–0		8–0
3	Atlético Porteño	4	1	0	3	2	11	−9	3		1–0	1–2	

Legend: Blue = home team win; Yellow = draw; Red = away team win.

=== Region VIII ===
Region VIII includes qualified teams from Arequipa, Moquegua and Tacna region.

Pos	Team	Pld	W	D	L	GF	GA	GD	Pts	Qualification	DPE	MMI	HUR
1	Deportivo Enersur	4	1	3	0	4	3	+1	6	National stage		1–1	1–0
2	Mariscal Miller	4	1	2	1	3	4	−1	5		1–1		1–0
3	Sportivo Huracán	4	1	1	2	3	3	0	4		1–1	2–0	

Legend: Blue = home team win; Yellow = draw; Red = away team win.

== National Stage ==
The National Stage started in November. The winners of the National Stage will be promoted to the 2004 Torneo Descentralizado. On every stage qualification is decided by points, no matter the goal difference. Third match played in neutral ground.

Quarterfinals
Universidad César Vallejo	2	3	5
Flamengo	0	2	2
UNAP	1	0	1
Abraham Valdelomar	1	2	3
Echa Muni	3	1	4
Deportivo Educación	2	2	4
Deportivo Enersur	2	0	2
Deportivo Garcilaso	1	1	2

Semifinals
Universidad César Vallejo	1	4	5
Abraham Valdelomar	1	0	1
Deportivo Educación	1	1	2
Deportivo Enersur	1	0	1

Finals
Universidad César Vallejo	3	0	3
Deportivo Educación	1	1	2

=== Quarterfinals ===
Team 1	Agg.	Team 2	1st leg	2nd leg
Universidad César Vallejo	5–2	Flamengo	2–0	3–2
UNAP	1–3	Abraham Valdelomar	1–1	0–2
Echa Muni	4–4	Deportivo Educación	3–2	1–2
Deportivo Enersur	2–2	Deportivo Garcilaso	2–1	0–1

==== Tiebreaker ====
Team 1	Score	Team 2
Deportivo Educación	3–1	Echa Muni
Deportivo Enersur	1–1 (4–3 p)	Deportivo Garcilaso

=== Semifinals ===
Team 1	Agg.	Team 2	1st leg	2nd leg
Abraham Valdelomar	1–5	Universidad César Vallejo	1–1	0–4
Deportivo Educación	2–1	Deportivo Enersur	1–1	1–0

=== Final ===
Team 1	Agg.	Team 2	1st leg	2nd leg
Universidad César Vallejo	3–2	Deportivo Educación	3–1	0–1

==== Tiebreaker ====
Team 1	Score	Team 2
Universidad César Vallejo	4–0	Deportivo Educación

== See also ==
- 2003 Torneo Descentralizado
- 2003 Peruvian Segunda División
