= 2004 Copa Perú =

Copa Perú
- Season: 2004
- Champions: Sport Ancash

The 2004 Copa Perú season (Spanish: Copa Perú 2004), the promotion tournament of Peruvian football.

The tournament has 5 stages. The first four stages are played as mini-league round-robin tournaments, except for third stage in region IV, which is played as a knockout stage. The final stage features two knockout rounds and a final four-team group stage to determine the two promoted teams.

The 2004 Peru Cup started with the District Stage (Spanish: Etapa Distrital) on February. The next stage was the Provincial Stage (Spanish: Etapa Provincial) which started, on June. The tournament continued with the Departamental Stage (Spanish: Etapa Departamental) on July. The Regional Staged followed. The National Stage (Spanish: Etapa Nacional) started on November. The winner of the National Stage will be promoted to the First Division.

== Departmental Stage ==
The following list shows the teams that qualified for the Regional Stage.

Department	Team	Location
Amazonas	Sport Sealcas	Amazonas
Amazonas	Higos Urco	Amazonas
Ancash	Sport Áncash	Ancash
Ancash	José Gálvez	Chimbote
Apurímac	José María Arguedas	Andahuaylas
Apurímac	Unión Grauína	Abancay
Arequipa	Senati	Arequipa
Arequipa	Juventus Corazón	Majes
Ayacucho	Deportivo Huáscar	Ayacucho
Ayacucho	San Francisco	Ayacucho
Cajamarca	Sporting Caxamarca	Cajamarca
Cajamarca	UTC	Cajamarca
Callao	Las Mercedes	Callao
Callao	Defensor Tacna	Callao
Cusco	Deportivo Garcilaso	Cusco
Cusco	Estudiantes Calca	Calca
Huancavelica	Lúcuma Dorada	Huancavelica
Huancavelica	Deportivo Municipal (Yauli)	Yauli
Huánuco	Alianza Universidad	Huánuco
Huánuco	León de Huánuco	Huánuco
Ica	Sport Alfonso Ugarte	Pisco
Ica	San José	Ica
Junín	Echa Muni	Junín
Junín	Santa Rita	Junín
La Libertad	Defensor Porvenir	La Libertad
La Libertad	Sport Vallejo	Trujillo

Department	Team	Location
Lambayeque	Flamengo	Chiclayo
Lambayeque	Universidad de Chiclayo	Chiclayo
Lima	Juventud Torre Blanca	Chancay
Lima	Independiente	Cañete
Loreto	UNAP	San Pablo
Loreto	San Juan de Miraflores	Iquitos
Madre de Dios	Fray Martín de Porres	Madre de Dios
Madre de Dios	Atlético Porteño	Puerto Maldonado
Moquegua	Deportivo Enersur	Moquegua
Moquegua	Mariscal Nieto	Moquegua
Pasco	Cultural Guadalupe	Huariaca
Pasco	UNDAC	Pasco
Piura	Academia Municipal	Talara
Piura	Olimpia	Piura
Puno	Franciscano San Román	Puno
Puno	Alfonso Ugarte	Puno
San Martín	El Tumi	San Martín
San Martín	Deportivo Comercio	Juanjuí
Segunda División	Olímpico Somos Peru	Lima
Segunda División	Deportivo Municipal	Lima
Tacna	Mariscal Miller	Tacna
Tacna	Coronel Bolognesi	Tacna
Tumbes	Independiente (Tumbes)	Tumbes
Tumbes	Unión Pacífico	Tumbes
Ucayali	San Juan	Ucayali
Ucayali	Deportivo Siloe	Pucallpa

== Regional Stage ==
On every stage qualification is decided by points, no matter the goal difference. Third match played in neutral ground.

=== Region I ===
Region I includes qualified teams from Amazonas, Lambayeque, Tumbes and Piura region.

==== Quarterfinals ====
Team 1	Agg.	Team 2	1st leg	2nd leg
Flamengo	3–1	Higos Urco	3–1	0–0
Sport Sealcas	1–5	Universidad de Chiclayo	0–1	1–4
Olimpia	2–0	Independiente (Tumbes)	2–0	0–0
Unión Pacífico	3–2	Academia Municipal	1–2	2–0

===== Tiebreaker =====
Team 1	Score	Team 2
Academia Municipal	4–0	Unión Pacífico

==== Semifinals ====
Team 1	Agg.	Team 2	1st leg	2nd leg
Universidad de Chiclayo	2–3	Academia Municipal	2–1	0–2
Olimpia	0–0	Flamengo	0–0	0–0

===== Tiebreaker =====
Team 1	Score	Team 2
Universidad de Chiclayo	1–0	Academia Municipal
Flamengo	1–1 (4–2 p)	Olimpia

=== Region II ===
Region II includes qualified teams from Ancash, Cajamarca, La Libertad and San Martín region.

==== Group A ====
Pos	Team	Pld	W	D	L	GF	GA	GD	Pts	Qualification	GAL	SPV	ETT	SPC
1	José Gálvez	6	4	1	1	11	6	+5	13	National stage		1–0	3–0	2–1
2	Sport Vallejo	6	4	1	1	13	7	+6	13		2–1		1–1	6–3
3	El Tumi	5	1	2	2	8	9	−1	5		2–2	1–2		4–1
4	Sporting Caxamarca	5	0	0	5	6	16	−10	0		1–2	0–2	W.O.	

Legend: Blue = home team win; Yellow = draw; Red = away team win.

===== Tiebreaker =====
Team 1	Score	Team 2
José Gálvez	3–1	Sport Vallejo

==== Group B ====
Pos	Team	Pld	W	D	L	GF	GA	GD	Pts	Qualification	CSÁ	COM	UTC	DPO
1	Sport Áncash	6	5	0	1	21	2	+19	15	National stage		8–0	1–0	3–0
2	Deportivo Comercio	5	2	1	2	7	14	−7	7		1–3		3–1	1–1
3	UTC	5	2	0	3	12	7	+5	6		1–0	W.O.		9–0
4	Defensor Porvenir	6	1	1	4	5	22	−17	4		1–3	1–2	3–1	

Legend: Blue = home team win; Yellow = draw; Red = away team win.

==== Regional Final ====
Team 1	Score	Team 2
Sport Áncash	1–0	José Gálvez

=== Region III ===
Region III includes qualified teams from Huanuco, Junin and Pasco region.

Pos	Team	Pld	W	D	L	GF	GA	GD	Pts	Qualification	EMJ	SRJ	ALI	UND	LEÓ	CGU
1	Echa Muni	10	7	2	1	19	8	+11	23	National stage		2–1	3–3	2–0	4–0	1–0
2	Santa Rita	10	4	3	3	18	16	+2	15	National stage	1–3		1–0	4–1	2–1	1–0
3	Alianza Universidad	10	3	4	3	10	11	−1	13		0–1	2–2		1–0	2–1	1–0
4	UNDAC	9	3	2	4	13	18	−5	11		1–0	1–1	1–1		5–2	2–1
5	León de Huánuco	10	2	4	4	17	21	−4	10		2–2	3–2	0–0	6–2		1–1
6	Cultural Guadalupe	9	1	3	5	8	11	−3	6		0–1	3–3	2–0	W.O.	1–1	

Legend: Blue = home team win; Yellow = draw; Red = away team win.

=== Region IV ===
Region IV includes qualified teams from Ayacucho, Huancavelica and Ica region.

Pos	Team	Pld	W	D	L	GF	GA	GD	Pts	Qualification	SJI	SAU	SFH	DMY	LDO	DPH
1	San José	10	6	3	1	20	8	+12	21	National stage		2–1	2–2	4–1	4–0	2–1
2	Sport Alfonso Ugarte	10	5	4	1	22	5	+17	19	National stage	0–0		2–0	4–1	5–0	7–0
3	San Francisco	10	4	3	3	10	9	+1	15		0–1	1–1		1–0	1–0	1–1
4	Deportivo Municipal (Yauli)	10	2	4	4	8	14	−6	10		1–1	0–0	1–2		0–0	2–1
5	Lúcuma Dorada	9	2	2	5	5	15	−10	8		2–1	0–1	1–0	1–2		1–1
6	Deportivo Huáscar	9	0	4	5	5	19	−14	4		0–3	1–1	0–2	0–0	W.O.	

Legend: Blue = home team win; Yellow = draw; Red = away team win.

=== Region V ===
Region V includes qualified teams from Callao, Lima, Loreto and Ucayali region.

==== Group A ====
Pos	Team	Pld	W	D	L	GF	GA	GD	Pts	Qualification	UNA	SJM	SJP	DPS
1	UNAP	6	5	0	1	15	6	+9	15	National stage		3–1	4–1	2–0
2	San Juan de Miraflores	6	3	0	3	11	11	0	9		0–2		4–2	2–0
3	San Juan	6	3	0	3	10	11	−1	9		3–1	2–0		0–2
4	Deportivo Siloe	6	1	0	5	5	13	−8	3		1–3	2–4	0–2	

Legend: Blue = home team win; Yellow = draw; Red = away team win.

==== Group B ====
===== Semifinals =====
Team 1	Agg.	Team 2	1st leg	2nd leg
Juventud Torre Blanca	10–0	Defensor Tacna	2–0	8–0
Las Mercedes	1–1	Independiente	1–0	0–1

====== Tiebreaker ======
Team 1	Score	Team 2
Independiente	4–1	Las Mercedes

===== Final =====
Team 1	Agg.	Team 2	1st leg	2nd leg
Juventud Torre Blanca	1–3	Independiente	0–2	1–1

=== Region VI ===
Pos	Team	Pld	W	D	L	GF	GA	GD	Pts	Qualification	OAM	DMU	CMP	USM	DAV	CRI	VCH	DVM	AELU	LPS	DSA	ALC
1	Olímpico Somos Perú	22	14	5	3	55	22	+33	47	National stage		1–1	0–1	6–2	2–1	3–3	3–0	0–1	2–0	4–1	4–2	4–0
2	Deportivo Municipal	22	13	6	3	36	14	+22	45	National stage	1–2		2–1	1–0	1–2	1–0	1–1	5–1	0–0	3–1	1–0	2–0
3	Unión de Campeones	22	13	5	4	42	20	+22	44		0–3	2–2		1–3	2–1	2–0	0–1	6–0	1–1	1–0	2–0	4–1
4	Universidad San Marcos	22	12	6	4	32	21	+11	42		2–2	0–1	0–0		4–2	0–0	1–0	1–2	0–0	1–0	2–1	3–1
5	Deportivo Aviación	22	10	6	6	42	30	+12	36		1–2	1–0	2–2	1–2		4–1	3–2	1–1	0–0	2–1	4–0	3–1
6	Sporting Cristal B (Note: Sporting Cristal B can´t be promoted as they are the "reserve team" of Sporting Cristal which plays in First Division.)	22	8	6	8	33	28	+5	30		3–2	1–3	2–2	1–1	1–1		0–1	0–1	1–0	4–0	3–2	7–0
7	Virgen de Chapi	22	8	4	10	24	33	−9	28		1–2	0–3	0–5	0–1	2–0	1–0		1–3	1–1	1–1	2–1	1–0
8	Defensor Villa del Mar	22	7	5	10	22	35	−13	26		0–2	0–2	1–2	1–3	1–2	0–1	2–0		1–0	2–1	1–2	1–1
9	AELU	22	4	9	9	17	25	−8	21		1–1	0–2	0–1	1–3	1–1	1–1	0–2	1–1		3–1	3–1	1–0
10	La Peña Sporting	22	4	7	11	18	35	−17	19		0–0	0–0	0–1	0–1	0–5	2–1	1–1	2–2	2–0		1–0	1–1
11	Somos Aduanas	22	5	2	15	23	43	−20	17		0–4	0–3	1–3	0–2	3–3	1–2	2–1	2–1	2–0	1–1		2–0
12	Alcides Vigo	22	1	5	16	14	52	−38	8		1–6	1–1	0–3	0–0	1–2	0–1	3–5	0–0	1–3	1–2	1–0	

Updated to match(es) played on unknown. Source:
Legend: Blue = home team win; Yellow = draw; Red = away team win.
Rules for classification: 1) points; 2) goal difference; 3) number of goals scored.

=== Region VII ===
Region VII includes qualified teams from Arequipa, Moquegua and Tacna region.

==== Group A ====
Pos	Team	Pld	W	D	L	GF	GA	GD	Pts	Qualification	SEN	DPE	BOL
1	Senati	3	2	1	0	7	4	+3	7	National stage		4–2	1–1
2	Deportivo Enersur	4	1	1	2	5	6	−1	4		1–2		0–0
3	Coronel Bolognesi	3	0	2	1	1	3	−2	2		W.O.	0–2	

Legend: Blue = home team win; Yellow = draw; Red = away team win.

==== Group B ====
Pos	Team	Pld	W	D	L	GF	GA	GD	Pts	Qualification	JVC	MMI	MNI
1	Juventus Corazón	4	4	0	0	14	1	+13	12	National stage		1–0	6–0
2	Mariscal Miller	4	2	0	2	7	4	+3	6		1–3		5–0
3	Mariscal Nieto	4	0	0	4	0	16	−16	0		0–4	0–1	

Legend: Blue = home team win; Yellow = draw; Red = away team win.

==== Regional Final ====
Team 1	Agg.	Team 2	1st leg	2nd leg
Juventus Corazón	3–1	Senati	1–0	2–1

=== Region VIII ===
Region VIII includes qualified teams from Apurímac, Cusco, Madre de Dios and Puno region.

==== Group A ====
Pos	Team	Pld	W	D	L	GF	GA	GD	Pts	Qualification	JMA	ALF	DPG	FMP
1	José María Arguedas	5	3	1	1	13	4	+9	10	Región VIII - Semifinals		2–0	–	8–1
2	Alfonso Ugarte	5	2	2	1	8	4	+4	8	Región VIII - Semifinals	1–0		0–0	5–0
3	Deportivo Garcilaso	5	1	3	1	5	5	0	6		1–1	2–2		2–1
4	Fray Martín de Porres	5	1	0	4	4	17	−13	3		1–2	–	1–0	

Legend: Blue = home team win; Yellow = draw; Red = away team win.

==== Group B ====
Pos	Team	Pld	W	D	L	GF	GA	GD	Pts	Qualification	FSR	ECA	POR	UGR
1	Franciscano San Román	5	4	0	1	13	8	+5	12	Región VIII - Semifinals		4–1	3–1	2–0
2	Estudiantes Calca	5	2	0	3	10	12	−2	6	Región VIII - Semifinals	5–2		–	1–2
3	Atlético Porteño	5	1	2	2	5	6	−1	5		1–2	3–1		0–0
4	Unión Grauína	5	1	2	2	3	5	−2	5		–	1–2	0–0	

Legend: Blue = home team win; Yellow = draw; Red = away team win.

==== Semifinals ====
Team 1	Agg.	Team 2	1st leg	2nd leg
Unión Grauína	2–4 (4–2 p)	José María Arguedas	0–3	2–1
Franciscano San Román	1–0	Alfonso Ugarte	1–0	0–0

==== Regional Final ====
Team 1	Score	Team 2
Franciscano San Román	1–0	Unión Grauína

== National Stage ==
The National Stage started in November. The winners of the National Stage was promoted to the 2005 Torneo Descentralizado. On every stage qualification is decided by points, no matter the goal difference. Third match played in neutral ground.

Round of 16
José Gálvez	2	1	3
Universidad de Chiclayo	1	1	2
Sport Áncash	1	4	5
Flamengo	0	0	0
Echa Muni	1	1	2
Sport Alfonso Ugarte	1	5	6
San José	4	2	6
Santa Rita	1	3	4
Deportivo Municipal	1	0	1
UNAP	0	1	1
Olímpico Somos Perú	5	1	6
Independiente	0	1	1
Juventus Corazón	1	1	2
Unión Grauína	0	3	3
Senati	1	1	2
Franciscano San Román	0	3	3

Quarterfinals
José Gálvez	1	3	4
Sport Áncash	4	2	6
Sport Alfonso Ugarte	3	0	3
San José	1	0	1
Deportivo Municipal	1	2	3
Olímpico Somos Perú	2	0	2
Unión Grauína	1	1	2
Senati	2	0	2

Final Group
Sport Áncash	2	1	3
Sport Alfonso Ugarte	1	1	2
Deportivo Municipal	8	0	8
Senati	2	1	3

Champion & Runner-Up
Sport Áncash	1	3	4
Deportivo Municipal	0	1	1

=== Round of 16 ===
Team 1	Agg.	Team 2	1st leg	2nd leg
José Gálvez	3–2	Universidad de Chiclayo	2–1	1–1
Flamengo	0–4	Sport Áncash	0–1	0–3
Echa Muni	2–6	Sport Alfonso Ugarte	1–1	1–5
San José	6–4	Santa Rita	4–1	2–3
Deportivo Municipal	1–1	UNAP	1–0	0–1
Olímpico Somos Perú	6–1	Independiente	5–0	1–1
Juventus Corazón	2–3	Unión Grauína	1–0	1–3
Senati	2–3	Franciscano San Román	1–0	1–3

==== Tiebreaker ====
Team 1	Score	Team 2
San José	2–1	Santa Rita
Deportivo Municipal	5–1	UNAP
Juventus Corazón	1–2	Unión Grauína
Senati	2–1	Franciscano San Román

=== Quarterfinals ===
Team 1	Agg.	Team 2	1st leg	2nd leg
Sport Áncash	6–4	José Gálvez	4–1	2–3
San José	1–3	Sport Alfonso Ugarte	1–3	0–0
Deportivo Municipal	3–2	Olímpico Somos Perú	1–2	2–0
Senati	2–2	Unión Grauína	2–1	0–1

==== Tiebreaker ====
Team 1	Score	Team 2
Sport Áncash	1–0	José Gálvez
Deportivo Municipal	3–2	Olímpico Somos Perú
Senati	1–0	Unión Grauína

=== Semifinals ===
Team 1	Agg.	Team 2	1st leg	2nd leg
Sport Alfonso Ugarte	2–3	Sport Áncash	1–2	1–1
Deportivo Municipal	8–3	Deportivo Enersur	8–2	0–1

==== Tiebreaker ====
Team 1	Score	Team 2
Deportivo Municipal	3–1	Senati

=== Final ===
Team 1	Agg.	Team 2	1st leg	2nd leg
Sport Áncash	4–1	Deportivo Municipal	1–0	3–1

== See also ==
- 2004 Torneo Descentralizado
- 2004 Peruvian Segunda División
