= Yanacancha District, Pasco =

Coordinates: 10.5546°S 76.2128°W

Yanacancha Yanakancha
- District
- Interactive map of Yanacancha
- Country: Peru
- Region: Pasco
- Province: Pasco
- Founded: November 27, 1944
- Capital: Yanacancha

Government
  - Mayor: Jhoni Teodosio Ventura Rivadeneira

Area
  - Total: 165.11 km^{2} (63.75 sq mi)
- Elevation: 4,350 m (14,270 ft)

Population (2005 census)
  - Total: 29,910
  - Density: 181.2/km^{2} (469.2/sq mi)
- Time zone: UTC-5 (PET)
- UBIGEO: 190113

Yanacancha District is one of thirteen districts of the province Pasco in Peru.
