= Unión Carolina =

Peruvian football club

- Full name: Club Deportivo Unión Carolina
- Nickname: Carolinos Albicelestes
- Founded: June 9, 1905
- Ground: Enrique Torres Belón, Puno
- Capacity: 20,000
- Chairman: Guido Velásquez Baylón
- Manager: Juan Mansilla
- League: Copa Perú
Home colours	Away colours

Unión Carolina is a Peruvian football club, playing in the city of Puno, Peru.

== History ==
In the 2005 Copa Perú, the club qualified to the National Stage, but was eliminated by the Senati FBC of Arequipa.

Its eternal rival is the Alfonso Ugarte, with which it disputes the derby of the city of Puno. At present it participates in the Liga Superior de Puno.

== Rivalries ==
Unión Carolina has had a long-standing rivalry with Diablos Rojos, Alfonso Ugarte and Real Carolino.

== Honours ==
=== Regional ===
- Región VIII:

Runner-up (1): 2005

- Liga Departamental de Puno:

Winners (3): 1966, 1967, 2006
Runner-up (1): 2005

- Liga Provincial de Puno:

Winners (5): 1952, 1956, 1958, 1966, 1967
Runner-up (3): 1954, 2002, 2006

- Liga Superior de Puno:

Runner-up (1): 2009

- Liga Distrital de Puno:

Winners (3): 1993, 2002, 2005
Runner-up (1): 2024

== See also ==
- List of football clubs in Peru
- Peruvian football league system
