= Asociación Deportiva Hospital =

Peruvian football club

Hospital
- Full name: Asociación Deportiva Hospital
- Nickname: Los Galenos
- Founded: February 25, 1971
- Ground: Estadio Aliardo Soria, Pucallpa
- Capacity: 15,000
- League: Copa Perú
- 2017: Departamental Stage
Home colours

Hospital is a Peruvian football club, playing in the city of Pucallpa, Ucayali.

The club was founded 1971 and plays in the Copa Perú, which is the third division of the Peruvian league.

== History ==
The club was founded on February 25, 1971, by a group of workers from the Regional Hospital of Pucallpa. Its first president was Carlos Salazar Vásquez. With the creation of the Regional Championships in the Peruvian Primera División, the club was invited to the 1984 Primera División in the Central Zone but failed to qualify for the Descentralizado tournament. In 1989, it returned to the top flight, competing in the Eastern Zone.

=== 1990 Torneo Descentralizado ===
The club won the inaugural Regional Championship of the Eastern Zone, earning qualification to the pre-liguilla, where it was eliminated by Unión Huaral with an aggregate score of 6–2. The following year, the club withdrew midway through the season and was relegated to the Copa Perú.

=== 2005 Copa Perú ===
The club reached the Regional Stage, where it was eliminated in Group IV by CNI. In the 2006 tournament, it qualified for the National Stage but was knocked out by Hijos de Acosvinchos in the quarter-finals.

=== 2007 Copa Perú ===
The club once again reached the National Stage after finishing second in Group IV behind UNU. In this phase, it eliminated Cooperativa Bolognesi of Barranco in the Round of 16 and UNU in the quarter-finals before being knocked out by Juan Aurich of Chiclayo in the semi-finals, losing 2–1 in Pucallpa and 1–0 away from home.

=== 2010 Copa Perú ===
The club once again reached the National Stage after finishing second in Group III behind Atlético Pucallpa. In this phase, it eliminated Juventud Barranco of Huacho in the Round of 16. It then knocked out Atlético Pucallpa in the quarter-finals before being eliminated by Unión Comercio in the semi-finals.

=== Relegation to the District Second Division ===
In 2016, the club failed to show up for its opening matches in the Liga Distrital de Callería and was consequently relegated to the district’s Second Division.

=== Club Reactivation ===
In 2023, part of the club’s former board of directors reunited to coordinate the reactivation of the club and pave the way for its return to official competitions such as the Copa Perú. Thus, in 2024, after nine years of inactivity, the club announced its comeback in the Second Division of the Liga Distrital de Callería, now under a new board and president.

In that tournament, the club finished tied for first place in Group E alongside Defensor Pucallpa, forcing a playoff match to determine qualification for the liguilla. After a 2–2 draw in regulation time, the club was eliminated in the penalty shootout.

== Honours ==
=== Senior titles ===
Keys

- Record
- ^{(s)} Shared record

Type	Competition	Titles	Runner-up	Winning years	Runner-up years
Half-year / Short tournament (League)	Torneo Zona Oriente	1	—	1990–I	—
Regional (League)	Región III	—	3	—	2006, 2007, 2010
Regional (League)	Liga Departamental de Ucayali	4	2	1982, 1987, 2005, 2010	2006, 2007
Regional (League)	Liga Provincial de Coronel Portillo	—	1	—	2010
Regional (League)	Liga Distrital de Callería	—	2	—	2009, 2010

== See also ==
- List of football clubs in Peru
- Peruvian football league system
