= Senati FBC =

Peruvian football club

- Ground: Estadio Mariano Melgar, Arequipa
- Capacity: 20,000
- League: Copa Perú
Home colours

Senati FBC is a Peruvian football club, playing in the city of Arequipa, Peru.

== History ==
Senati FBC is of one the clubs with the greatest tradition in the city of Arequipa, Peru.

In 2004 Copa Perú, the club qualified to the National Stage but was eliminated by Deportivo Municipal of Lima in the semifinals.

In 2005 Copa Perú, the club qualified to the National Stage but was eliminated by José Gálvez of Chimbote in the final.

In 2006 Copa Perú, the club qualified to the National Stage but was eliminated by Total Clean of Arequipa in the quarterfinals.

== Honours ==
=== National ===
- Copa Perú: 0

Runner-up (1): 2005

=== Regional ===
- Región VII: 1

Winners (1): 2005
Runner-up (2): 2004, 2006

- Región VIII: 0

Runner-up (1): 1998

- Liga Departamental de Arequipa: 3

Winners (3): 1998, 2004, 2005
Runner-up (1): 2006

== See also ==
- List of football clubs in Peru
- Peruvian football league system
