= La Unión District, Piura =

La Unión District
- District
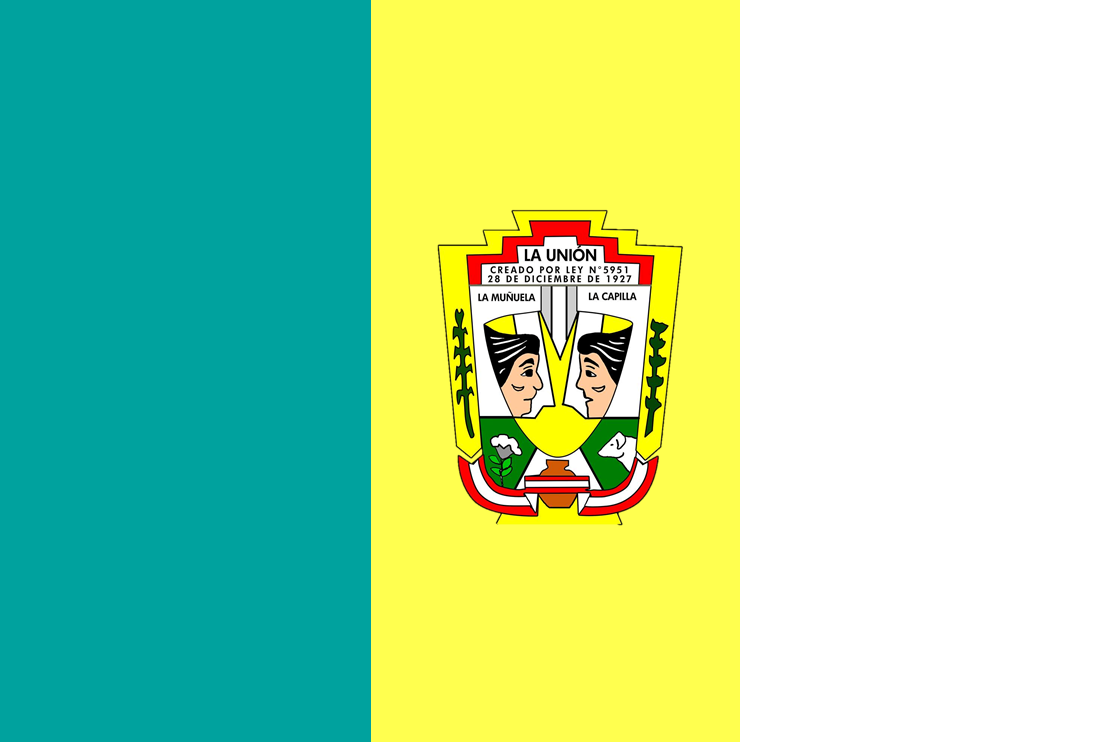
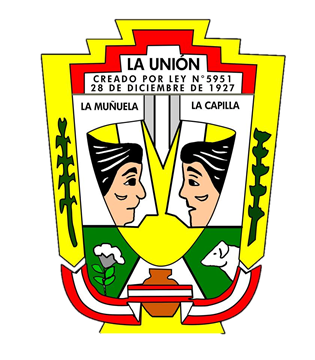
- Flag Coat of arms
- Interactive map of La Unión District
- Coordinates: 5°19′20″S 80°51′49″W
- Country: Peru
- Region: Piura
- Province: Piura
- Founded: December 28, 1927
- Capital: La Unión

Government
  - Mayor: Ruperto Fernández Sernaqué (2023–2026)

Area
  - Total: 213.16 km^{2} (82.30 sq mi)
- Elevation: 17 m (56 ft)

Population (2005 census)
  - Total: 34,540
  - Density: 162.0/km^{2} (419.7/sq mi)
- Time zone: UTC-5 (PET)
- UBIGEO: 200110
- Website: Municipalidad Distrital de La Unión

La Unión District is one of ten districts of the province Piura in Peru. The district was created by the law Ley N° 5951 of December 28, 1927 during the government of President Augusto Leguía.
