= Deportivo Educación =

Peruvian football club

- Full name: Club Deportivo Educación de Abancay
- Nickname: DEA
- Founded: July 4, 1972
- Ground: Estadio Monumental de Condebamba, Abancay
- Capacity: 10,000
- Chairman: Oscar Montes Trujillo
- Manager: Everson Inca
- League: Copa Perú
Home colours	Away colours

Club Deportivo Educación is a Peruvian football club, playing in the city of Abancay, Apurímac.

== Rivalries ==
Deportivo Educación has had a long-standing rivalry with Miguel Grau.

== Honours ==
=== National ===
- Copa Perú: 0

Runner-up (1): 2003

=== Regional ===
- Región VI:

Winners (3): 1999, 2001, 2003

- Región VIII:

Winners (1): 2005
Runner-up (1): 2006

- Liga Departamental de Apurímac:

Winners (10): 1981, 1982, 1983 1988, 1994, 1999, 2001, 2002, 2003, 2006
Runner-up (4): 2005, 2007, 2008, 2009

- Liga Distrital de Abancay:

Winners (15): 1983, 1984, 1988, 1994, 1999, 2001, 2002, 2003, 2005, 2007, 2008, 2009, 2011, 2015, 2019

== See also ==
- List of football clubs in Peru
- Peruvian football league system
