= 2002 Peruvian Segunda División =

Peruvian Segunda División
- Season: 2002
- Dates: 20 April – 23 November 2002
- Champions: Unión Huaral
- Relegated: Bella Esperanza; Lawn Tennis; Guardia Republicana
- Matches: 240
- Goals: 733 (3.05 per match)

The 2002 Peruvian Segunda División, the second division of Peruvian football (soccer), was played by 16 teams. The tournament winner, Unión Huaral was promoted to the 2003 Torneo Descentralizado. The last places, Guardia Republicana, Lawn Tennis, and Bella Esperanza were relegated. The tournament was played on a home-and-away round-robin basis.

== Teams ==
=== Team changes ===
Promoted from 2001 Liga Provincial de Lima	Promoted from 2001 Liga Departamental del Callao	Relegated to 2002 Copa Perú
▲ Defensor Villa del Mar (1st)	▲ Somos Aduanas (1st)	▼ Aurora Chancayllo (15th) ▼ Hijos de Yurimaguas (16th)

=== Stadia and Locations ===
Team	City
AELU	Pueblo Libre, Lima
Alcides Vigo	Barranco, Lima
América Cochahuayco	San Luis, Lima
Bella Esperanza	Cerro Azul, Lima
Deportivo Aviación	Lima
Deportivo Municipal	Cercado de Lima
Defensor Villa del Mar	Villa El Salvador, Lima
Guardia Republicana	La Molina, Lima
Lawn Tennis	Jesús María, Lima
Olímpico Somos Perú	Surco, Lima
Somos Aduanas	Callao
Sport Coopsol	Lima
Sporting Cristal B	Rímac, Lima
Unión Huaral	Huaral
Universidad San Marcos	Cercado de Lima
Virgen de Chapi	Santa Anita, Lima

== League table ==
=== Standings ===
Pos	Team	Pld	W	D	L	GF	GA	GD	Pts	Promotion or relegation
1	Unión Huaral (C)	30	22	4	4	57	26	+31	70	2003 Primera División
2	Defensor Villa del Mar	30	22	3	5	69	30	+39	69	
3	Sporting Cristal B (Note: Sporting Cristal B can´t be promoted as they are the "reserve team" of Sporting Cristal which plays in First Division.)	30	17	6	7	58	34	+24	57	
4	Deportivo Municipal	30	16	7	7	53	40	+13	55	
5	Alcides Vigo	30	15	7	8	58	29	+29	52	
6	Olímpico Somos Perú	30	14	6	10	42	34	+8	48	
7	AELU	30	12	9	9	50	36	+14	45	
8	América Cochahuayco	30	13	6	11	48	37	+11	45	
9	Deportivo Aviación	30	9	9	12	42	47	−5	36	
10	Virgen de Chapi	30	10	4	16	40	55	−15	34	
11	Universidad San Marcos	30	7	12	11	49	48	+1	33	
12	Somos Aduanas	30	8	9	13	41	48	−7	33	
13	Sport Coopsol	30	7	10	13	33	50	−17	31	
14	Guardia Republicana (R)	30	8	4	18	36	52	−16	28	2003 Copa Perú
15	Lawn Tennis (R)	30	7	6	17	46	59	−13	27	2003 Copa Perú
16	Bella Esperanza (R)	30	1	2	27	12	109	−97	5	2003 Copa Perú

Updated to match(es) played on 2003. Source:
Rules for classification: 1) points; 2) goal difference; 3) number of goals scored.
(C) Champions; (R) Relegated

== Results ==
Home \ Away	AELU	ALC	AME	BEL	DVM	DAV	DMU	GUA	LAW	OAM	DSA	COO	CRI	HUA	USM	VCH
AELU		0–0	3–2	2–0	4–0	3–1	2–2	0–0	0–1	2–2	1–2	6–0	1–2	1–2	3–2	2–2
Alcides Vigo	1–0		0–0	7–2	1–1	1–0	1–2	3–2	3–0	1–0	0–0	1–2	2–3	0–0	1–0	7–1
América Cochahuayco	2–3	0–1		4–0	0–1	1–0	0–1	1–0	1–0	2–3	2–0	0–1	1–0	2–1	2–2	2–3
Bella Esperanza	0–5	1–4	0–5		0–3	1–1	0–1	0–1	0–7	1–3	0–2	0–1	1–6	1–1	1–0	1–3
Defensor Villa del Mar	4–2	2–1	0–2	8–0		4–0	1–1	4–0	4–2	1–0	3–2	2–1	1–0	2–1	1–1	2–0
Deportivo Aviación	0–0	2–1	3–4	6–0	2–1		1–1	1–0	3–2	0–0	1–0	1–3	1–3	0–2	2–2	1–0
Deportivo Municipal	4–0	1–5	3–2	4–0	1–2	3–1		4–1	2–2	1–2	1–1	1–0	1–0	0–2	0–3	2–0
Guardia Republicana	1–4	1–3	2–2	1–0	0–1	1–0	1–2		6–3	1–2	2–2	1–0	3–2	2–4	0–2	4–0
Lawn Tennis	2–1	0–2	0–1	2–0	2–3	3–3	2–3	1–0		1–2	1–1	1–1	3–3	1–3	1–0	1–2
Olímpico Somos Perú	0–1	0–3	2–0	4–2	0–1	1–1	1–0	2–1	2–1		2–2	1–1	2–2	0–1	5–0	2–1
Somos Aduanas	0–0	1–5	2–3	4–0	1–3	2–4	3–3	1–0	4–1	0–1		1–0	1–2	0–2	1–1	2–1
Sport Coopsol	0–0	1–1	1–1	3–2	0–5	3–2	2–2	0–0	1–1	2–1	0–2		2–3	0–2	1–1	0–1
Sporting Cristal B	2–0	3–1	1–0	3–1	2–1	1–1	1–2	1–0	2–0	4–0	1–1	2–0		2–3	4–2	1–2
Unión Huaral	0–1	2–1	2–2	5–0	3–2	1–0	2–1	1–0	3–2	1–0	2–0	2–1	0–1		1–0	2–2
Universidad San Marcos	2–2	1–1	1–1	10–1	1–3	2–2	2–3	2–4	2–1	1–0	3–1	2–2	0–0	1–4		2–0
Virgen de Chapi	0–1	1–0	1–3	2–0	0–3	1–2	0–1	4–1	1–2	1–2	3–1	5–4	1–1	1–2	1–1	

Updated to match(es) played on 2002. Source: RSSSF
Legend: Blue = home team win; Yellow = draw; Red = away team win.

== See also ==
- 2002 Torneo Descentralizado
- 2002 Copa Perú
