= 2000 Peruvian Segunda División =

Peruvian Segunda División
- Season: 2000
- Dates: 20 May – 11 November 2000
- Champions: Aviación-FAP
- Runner up: Alcides Vigo
- Matches: 156
- Goals: 384 (2.46 per match)
- Top goalscorer: Jerry Tamashiro; Pedro Sanguinetti; César Goya (12 goals each)

The 2000 Peruvian Segunda División, the second division of Peruvian football (soccer), was played by 13 teams. The tournament winner, Aviación-FAP was promoted to the Playoff. The tournament was played on a home-and-away round-robin basis.

- Sporting Cristal B can´t be promoted as they are the "reserve team" of Sporting Cristal which plays in First Division.

== Teams ==
=== Team changes ===
Promoted from
1999 Liga Provincial de Lima
▲ Olímpico Somos Perú (1st)

=== Stadia and Locations ===
| Team | City |
|---|---|
| AELU | Pueblo Libre, Lima |
| Alcides Vigo | Barranco, Lima |
| América Cochahuayco | San Luis, Lima |
| Aviación-FAP | Lima |
| Bella Esperanza | Cerro Azul, Lima |
| Guardia Republicana | La Molina, Lima |
| Hijos de Yurimaguas | Callao |
| Lawn Tennis | Jesús María, Lima |
| Olímpico Somos Perú | Surco, Lima |
| Sport Coopsol | Lima |
| Sporting Cristal B | Rímac, Lima |
| Unión Huaral | Huaral |
| Virgen de Chapi | Santa Anita, Lima |

== League table ==
=== Standings ===
| Pos | Team | Pld | W | D | L | GF | GA | GD | Pts | Qualification |
|---|---|---|---|---|---|---|---|---|---|---|
| 1 | Aviación-FAP (C) | 24 | 15 | 7 | 2 | 39 | 14 | +25 | 52 | Promotion play-off |
| 2 | Alcides Vigo | 24 | 15 | 3 | 6 | 38 | 23 | +15 | 48 | |
| 3 | Hijos de Yurimaguas | 24 | 14 | 4 | 6 | 30 | 21 | +9 | 46 | |
| 4 | Sporting Cristal B (Note: As the senior team was competing in Primera División, the club played the second division with reserve teams.) | 24 | 13 | 3 | 8 | 51 | 32 | +19 | 42 | |
| 5 | América Cochahuayco | 24 | 12 | 5 | 7 | 34 | 27 | +7 | 41 | |
| 6 | AELU | 24 | 10 | 8 | 6 | 27 | 18 | +9 | 38 | |
| 7 | Lawn Tennis | 24 | 10 | 6 | 8 | 30 | 23 | +7 | 36 | |
| 8 | Sport Coopsol | 24 | 7 | 8 | 9 | 26 | 24 | +2 | 29 | |
| 9 | Unión Huaral | 24 | 7 | 4 | 13 | 22 | 31 | −9 | 25 | |
| 10 | Bella Esperanza | 24 | 6 | 4 | 14 | 27 | 64 | −37 | 22 | |
| 11 | Virgen de Chapi | 24 | 4 | 9 | 11 | 25 | 34 | −9 | 21 | |
| 12 | Olímpico Somos Perú | 24 | 4 | 6 | 14 | 19 | 37 | −18 | 18 | |
| 13 | Guardia Republicana | 24 | 3 | 5 | 16 | 22 | 42 | −20 | 14 | |

Updated to match(es) played on 2001. Source:
Rules for classification: 1) points; 2) goal difference; 3) number of goals scored.
(C) Champions

== Results ==
| Home \ Away | AELU | ALC | AME | DAV | BEL | GUA | HIJ | LAW | OAM | COO | CRI | HUA | VCH |
|---|---|---|---|---|---|---|---|---|---|---|---|---|---|
| AELU | | 0–1 | 1–1 | 1–0 | 1–1 | 2–1 | 2–1 | 0–0 | 0–0 | 2–0 | 1–2 | 1–0 | 1–0 |
| Alcides Vigo | 2–1 | | 2–0 | 0–1 | 4–2 | 2–1 | 1–2 | 2–1 | 3–2 | 1–0 | 2–1 | 0–1 | 1–0 |
| América Cochahuayco | 1–0 | 2–1 | | 1–2 | 5–1 | 2–1 | 1–0 | 1–3 | 3–1 | 0–2 | 2–0 | 1–0 | 2–2 |
| Aviación-FAP | 1–1 | 0–0 | 2–0 | | 3–1 | 2–0 | 2–0 | 0–0 | 3–0 | 1–1 | 2–2 | 2–0 | 3–1 |
| Bella Esperanza | 1–0 | 0–2 | 3–1 | 1–3 | | 1–0 | 1–3 | 1–2 | 3–3 | 1–0 | 2–5 | 1–0 | 2–1 |
| Guardia Republicana | 0–0 | 2–1 | 0–1 | 2–1 | 1–0 | | 0–1 | 0–1 | 1–1 | 0–3 | 2–2 | 2–2 | 1–1 |
| Hijos de Yurimaguas | 1–1 | 1–0 | 1–1 | 1–1 | 2–0 | 2–0 | | 1–0 | 1–0 | 1–1 | 2–1 | 2–1 | 0–1 |
| Lawn Tennis | 1–0 | 1–1 | 2–0 | 0–0 | 8–1 | 2–1 | 1–3 | | 0–1 | 0–1 | 1–0 | 2–1 | 1–1 |
| Olímpico Somos Perú | 1–2 | 0–3 | 0–1 | 0–3 | 0–0 | 2–1 | 0–1 | 1–0 | | 0–0 | 0–1 | 3–1 | 0–0 |
| Sport Coopsol | 1–2 | 1–2 | 1–1 | 0–1 | 5–1 | 2–1 | 1–2 | 1–1 | 3–2 | | 0–3 | 0–0 | 2–0 |
| Sporting Cristal B | 0–3 | 2–4 | 1–1 | 2–3 | 10–1 | 4–2 | 4–0 | 3–0 | 1–0 | 1–0 | | 0–2 | 2–0 |
| Unión Huaral | 0–3 | 0–1 | 0–4 | 0–1 | 2–0 | 4–1 | 0–2 | 2–0 | 3–2 | 0–0 | 2–3 | | 1–0 |
| Virgen de Chapi | 2–2 | 2–2 | 1–2 | 1–2 | 3–3 | 3–2 | 1–0 | 1–3 | 3–0 | 1–1 | 0–1 | 0–0 | |

Updated to match(es) played on 2000. Source: RSSSF
Legend: Blue = home team win; Yellow = draw; Red = away team win.

== Promotion play-off ==
13 December 2000
15:30

| Deportivo UPAO | 3–1 | Deportivo Aviación |
|---|---|---|
| Rodrigo Saraz 33'; Néstor Mordini 66'; Miguel Huertas 88' | | Jerry Tamashiro 79' |

Estadio Nacional, Lima
Attendance: 10,000
Referee: Gilberto Hidalgo
Deportivo UPAO remained in Peruvian Primera División (Note: UPAO would sell their first division spot to Sport Coopsol before the 2001 season.)

== See also ==
- 2000 Torneo Descentralizado
- 2000 Copa Perú
