= 2001 Peruvian Segunda División =

Peruvian Segunda División
- Season: 2001
- Dates: 5 May – 8 December 2001
- Champions: Alcides Vigo
- Relegated: Hijos de Yurimaguas; Aurora Chancayllo
- Top goalscorer: Roberto Salazar (17 goals)

The 2001 Peruvian Segunda División, the second division of Peruvian football (soccer), was played by 16 teams. The tournament winner, Alcides Vigo was promoted to the Playoff. The last places, Aurora Chancayllo and Hijos de Yurimaguas were relegated. The tournament was played on a home-and-away round-robin basis.

- Sporting Cristal B can't be promoted as they are the "reserve team" of Sporting Cristal which plays in First Division.

== Teams ==
=== Team changes ===
| Relegated from 2000 Primera División | Promoted from 2000 Liga Provincial de Lima | Promoted from 2000 Liga Departamental de Lima |
|---|---|---|
| ▼ Deportivo Municipal (12th) | ▲ Universidad San Marcos (1st) | ▲ Aurora Chancayllo (1st) |

=== Stadia and Locations ===
| Team | City |
|---|---|
| AELU | Pueblo Libre, Lima |
| Alcides Vigo | Barranco, Lima |
| América Cochahuayco | San Luis, Lima |
| Aurora Chancayllo | Chancay, Lima |
| Bella Esperanza | Cerro Azul, Lima |
| Deportivo Aviación | Lima |
| Deportivo Municipal | Cercado de Lima |
| Guardia Republicana | La Molina, Lima |
| Hijos de Yurimaguas | Callao |
| Lawn Tennis | Jesús María, Lima |
| Olímpico Somos Perú | Surco, Lima |
| Sport Coopsol | Lima |
| Sporting Cristal B | Rímac, Lima |
| Unión Huaral | Huaral |
| Universidad San Marcos | Cercado de Lima |
| Virgen de Chapi | Santa Anita, Lima |

== League table ==
=== Standings ===
| Pos | Team | Pld | W | D | L | GF | GA | GD | Pts | Promotion or relegation |
|---|---|---|---|---|---|---|---|---|---|---|
| 1 | Alcides Vigo (C) | 30 | 18 | 8 | 4 | 39 | 19 | +20 | 62 | Promotion Play-off |
| 2 | AELU | 30 | 18 | 5 | 7 | 52 | 28 | +24 | 59 | |
| 3 | Bella Esperanza | 30 | 16 | 7 | 7 | 41 | 25 | +16 | 55 | |
| 4 | Guardia Republicana | 30 | 14 | 11 | 5 | 40 | 26 | +14 | 53 | |
| 5 | Universidad San Marcos | 30 | 14 | 5 | 11 | 39 | 45 | −6 | 47 | |
| 6 | Sporting Cristal B (Note: As the senior team was competing in Primera División, the club played the second division with reserve teams.) | 30 | 13 | 7 | 10 | 41 | 33 | +8 | 46 | |
| 7 | Unión Huaral | 30 | 11 | 9 | 10 | 39 | 40 | −1 | 42 | |
| 8 | Deportivo Municipal | 30 | 11 | 7 | 12 | 43 | 41 | +2 | 40 | |
| 9 | Sport Coopsol | 30 | 10 | 9 | 11 | 30 | 35 | −5 | 39 | |
| 10 | Lawn Tennis | 30 | 9 | 10 | 11 | 33 | 39 | −6 | 37 | |
| 11 | Deportivo Aviación | 30 | 9 | 9 | 12 | 38 | 37 | +1 | 36 | |
| 12 | Virgen de Chapi | 30 | 10 | 5 | 15 | 39 | 43 | −4 | 35 | |
| 13 | Olímpico Somos Perú | 30 | 9 | 5 | 16 | 32 | 48 | −16 | 32 | |
| 14 | América Cochahuayco | 30 | 6 | 11 | 13 | 30 | 36 | −6 | 29 | |
| 15 | Aurora Chancayllo (R) | 30 | 6 | 10 | 14 | 42 | 52 | −10 | 28 | 2002 Copa Perú |
| 16 | Hijos de Yurimaguas (R) | 30 | 3 | 8 | 19 | 24 | 56 | −32 | 17 | 2002 Copa Perú |

Updated to match(es) played on 2001. Source:
Rules for classification: 1) points; 2) goal difference; 3) number of goals scored.
(C) Champions; (R) Relegated

== Results ==
| Home \ Away | AELU | ALC | AME | AUR | BEL | DAV | DMU | GUA | HIJ | LAW | OAM | COO | CRI | HUA | USM | VCH |
|---|---|---|---|---|---|---|---|---|---|---|---|---|---|---|---|---|
| AELU | | 1–0 | 2–1 | 2–2 | 0–0 | 0–1 | 0–5 | 0–1 | 3–1 | 3–1 | 1–3 | 0–0 | 0–1 | 1–0 | 2–0 | 4–2 |
| Alcides Vigo | 2–0 | | 1–0 | 2–0 | 0–2 | 1–1 | 1–0 | 0–0 | 0–0 | 1–1 | 1–0 | 0–1 | 3–0 | 2–2 | 1–0 | 2–1 |
| América Cochahuayco | 1–1 | 1–2 | | 2–2 | 0–0 | 1–0 | 1–2 | 1–1 | 1–2 | 1–1 | 2–1 | 0–2 | 0–2 | 1–2 | 3–0 | 0–1 |
| Aurora Chancayllo | 0–2 | 2–3 | 3–2 | | 0–1 | 1–2 | 2–2 | 1–1 | 2–2 | 2–2 | 2–0 | 1–1 | 4–0 | 1–1 | 2–4 | 1–0 |
| Bella Esperanza | 0–2 | 1–1 | 1–1 | 1–2 | | 3–1 | 0–1 | 0–1 | 1–0 | 1–0 | 6–1 | 0–1 | 1–1 | 1–4 | 2–0 | 2–3 |
| Deportivo Aviación | 0–2 | 0–1 | 0–1 | 1–1 | 1–2 | | 7–1 | 2–3 | 1–1 | 3–1 | 1–2 | 2–1 | 0–0 | 1–1 | 3–4 | 1–1 |
| Deportivo Municipal | 1–2 | 2–5 | 1–3 | 1–1 | 1–1 | 1–1 | | 0–2 | 2–0 | 1–0 | 3–1 | 2–0 | 1–1 | 0–1 | 0–1 | 0–1 |
| Guardia Republicana | 2–1 | 0–0 | 0–0 | 2–1 | 0–0 | 0–1 | 3–2 | | 0–1 | 2–0 | 0–1 | 3–2 | 3–2 | 0–1 | 1–1 | 1–1 |
| Hijos de Yurimaguas | 1–2 | 0–3 | 1–1 | 3–0 | 0–1 | 1–1 | 1–2 | 0–2 | | 1–1 | 0–0 | 1–1 | 1–6 | 3–6 | 0–1 | 0–3 |
| Lawn Tennis | 0–1 | 1–2 | 1–0 | 2–1 | 2–4 | 1–2 | 2–1 | 1–1 | 2–0 | | 1–0 | 1–1 | 3–0 | 0–0 | 1–1 | 0–4 |
| Olímpico Somos Perú | 0–3 | 0–1 | 2–2 | 3–1 | 0–2 | 1–0 | 1–4 | 1–3 | 1–0 | 1–2 | | 3–2 | 0–1 | 1–1 | 1–2 | 3–1 |
| Sport Coopsol | 1–5 | 0–1 | 1–1 | 1–0 | 0–1 | 0–2 | 1–0 | 1–1 | 2–0 | 1–0 | 2–2 | | 1–1 | 0–1 | 1–1 | 1–0 |
| Sporting Cristal B | 1–2 | 0–1 | 0–1 | 2–1 | 1–2 | 2–1 | 0–0 | 1–0 | 2–0 | 2–2 | 0–1 | 3–0 | | 1–1 | 2–1 | 4–0 |
| Unión Huaral | 0–4 | 0–0 | 2–1 | 4–2 | 0–2 | 0–1 | 1–1 | 1–2 | 2–1 | 0–1 | 1–1 | 0–2 | 1–3 | | 3–1 | 3–1 |
| Universidad San Marcos | 0–5 | 2–1 | 1–1 | 1–2 | 0–1 | 2–0 | 0–2 | 2–4 | 3–2 | 2–2 | 2–1 | 2–1 | 1–0 | 2–0 | | 1–0 |
| Virgen de Chapi | 1–1 | 0–1 | 1–0 | 3–2 | 1–2 | 1–1 | 1–4 | 1–1 | 4–1 | 0–1 | 1–0 | 1–2 | 1–2 | 3–1 | 1–2 | |

Updated to match(es) played on 2002. Source: RSSSF
Legend: Blue = home team win; Yellow = draw; Red = away team win.

== Promotion play-off ==
29 December 2001
15:00

| Deportivo Wanka | 1–0 (a.e.t.) | Alcides Vigo |
|---|---|---|
| Jorge Ramírez 99' |

Estadio Nacional, Lima
Referee: Ángel Ziani
Deportivo Wanka remained in Primera División

== See also ==
- 2001 Torneo Descentralizado
- 2001 Copa Perú
