= Román Ojeda =

Peruvian footballer (born 1980)

Luis Román Ojeda
Personal information
- Full name: Luis Román Ojeda Alva
- Date of birth: May 10, 1980 (age 46)
- Place of birth: Chancay, Peru
- Height: 1.71 m (5 ft 7 in)
- Position: Midfielder

Team information
- Current team: Sport Huancayo
- Number: 24

Senior career*
Years	Team	Apps	(Gls)
2002	Unión Huaral		
2003–2005	Olimpico Somos Perú		
2006–2008	Atlético Minero		
2009	Sporting Cristal	0	(0)
2009	Colegio Nacional Iquitos	5	(0)
2010–2011	Cienciano	35	(1)
2012–	Sport Huancayo	0	(0)
- * Club domestic league appearances and goals as of 25 January 2012

Luis Román Ojeda Alva (born May 10, 1980) is a Peruvian professional footballer who plays as a midfielder for Sport Huancayo in the Peruvian Primera División. He is the older brother of Rodolfo Ojeda.

== Career ==
Luis Román Ojeda started his career playing for Sport Dinámico, a local team from his hometown. He then went on to play for other local teams such as Defensor Huaura, Aurora Chancayllo y Juventud Torreblanca. Then in 2002 Ojeda joined Peruvian Second Division side Unión Huaral. That year he debuted in the 2002 Segunda División Peruana season. Then in 2003 he joined Peruvian Second Division side Olimpico Somos Perú, where he played the 2003, 2004, and 2005 seasons.

In 2006, he joined Peruvian Second Division club Atlético Minero. He helped his side finish in 2nd place at the end of the 2007 season and thus promotion to the Peruvian First Division. With Atlético Minero Ojeda made his debut in the Peruvian First Division in the Second Round of the 2008 Torneo Descentralizado season at home in the Matucana stadium against Sport Boys. The manager José Ramírez Cuba allowed him to play the entire match, which finished in a 3–0 win for his club. Ojeda made 44 league appearances that season. However his club was relegated at the end of the season as they lost in the relegation decider match against Juan Aurich.

In 2009, he transferred, along with his brother Rodolfo Ojeda, to Sporting Cristal for the start of the 2009 season. However, he did not manage to break into the first team and left Sporting Cristal without making any league appearances.
