= 2004 Peruvian Segunda División =

Peruvian Segunda División
- Season: 2004
- Dates: 24 July – 27 October 2004
- Champions: Olímpico Somos Perú
- Relegated: Alcides Vigo
- Matches: 132
- Goals: 359 (2.72 per match)
- Top goalscorer: Juan Luna (18 goals)

The 2004 Peruvian Segunda División, the second division of Peruvian football (soccer), was played by 12 teams. The tournament winner, Olímpico Somos Perú was promoted to the Copa Perú. The last place, Alcides Vigo was relegated. The tournament was played on a home-and-away round-robin basis.

== Teams ==
=== Team changes ===
Unión de Campeones bought the promotional place of the 2003 Liga Provincial de Lima winners, San José Joyeros.

Promoted from 2003 Liga Provincial de Lima	Promoted to 2004 Primera División	Relegated to 2004 Copa Perú
▲ San José Joyeros (1st)	▲ Sport Coopsol (1st)	▼ América Cochahuayco (12th)

=== Stadia and Locations ===
Team	City
AELU	Pueblo Libre, Lima
Alcides Vigo	Barranco, Lima
Deportivo Aviación	Lima
Deportivo Municipal	Cercado de Lima
Defensor Villa del Mar	Villa El Salvador, Lima
La Peña Sporting	Lince, Lima
Olímpico Somos Perú	Surco, Lima
Somos Aduanas	Callao
Sporting Cristal B	Rímac, Lima
Unión de Campeones	Ate, Lima
Universidad San Marcos	Cercado de Lima
Virgen de Chapi	Santa Anita, Lima

== League table ==
=== Standings ===
Pos	Team	Pld	W	D	L	GF	GA	GD	Pts	Qualification or relegation
1	Olímpico Somos Perú (C)	22	14	5	3	55	22	+33	47	2004 Copa Perú - National Stage
2	Deportivo Municipal	22	13	6	3	36	14	+22	45	2004 Copa Perú - National Stage
3	Unión de Campeones	22	13	5	4	42	20	+22	44	
4	Universidad San Marcos	22	12	6	4	32	21	+11	42	
5	Deportivo Aviación	22	10	6	6	42	30	+12	36	
6	Sporting Cristal B (Note: Sporting Cristal B can´t be promoted as they are the "reserve team" of Sporting Cristal which plays in First Division.)	22	8	6	8	33	28	+5	30	
7	Virgen de Chapi	22	8	4	10	24	33	−9	28	
8	Defensor Villa del Mar	22	7	5	10	22	35	−13	26	
9	AELU	22	4	9	9	17	25	−8	21	
10	La Peña Sporting	22	4	7	11	18	35	−17	19	
11	Somos Aduanas	22	5	2	15	23	43	−20	17	
12	Alcides Vigo (R)	22	1	5	16	14	52	−38	8	2005 Copa Perú

Updated to match(es) played on 2004. Source:
Rules for classification: 1) points; 2) goal difference; 3) number of goals scored.
(C) Champions; (R) Relegated

== Results ==
Home \ Away	AELU	ALC	DVM	DAV	DMU	LPS	OAM	DSA	CRI	USM	CMP	VCH
AELU		1–0	1–1	1–1	0–2	3–1	1–1	3–1	1–1	1–3	0–1	0–2
Alcides Vigo	1–3		0–0	1–2	1–1	1–2	1–6	1–0	0–1	0–0	0–3	3–5
Defensor Villa del Mar	1–0	1–1		1–2	0–2	2–1	0–2	1–2	0–1	1–3	1–2	2–0
Deportivo Aviación	0–0	3–1	1–1		1–0	2–1	1–2	4–0	4–1	1–2	2–2	3–2
Deportivo Municipal	0–0	2–0	5–1	1–2		3–1	1–2	1–0	1–0	1–0	2–1	1–1
La Peña Sporting	2–0	1–1	2–2	0–5	0–0		0–0	1–0	2–1	0–1	0–1	1–1
Olímpico Somos Perú	2–0	4–0	0–1	2–1	1–1	4–1		4–2	3–3	6–2	0–1	3–0
Somos Aduanas	2–0	2–0	2–1	3–3	0–3	1–1	0–4		1–2	0–2	1–3	2–1
Sporting Cristal B	1–0	7–0	0–1	1–1	1–3	4–0	3–2	3–2		1–1	2–2	0–1
Universidad San Marcos	0–0	3–1	1–2	4–2	0–1	1–0	2–2	2–1	0–0		0–0	1–0
Unión de Campeones	1–1	4–1	6–0	2–1	2–2	1–0	0–3	2–0	2–0	1–3		0–1
Virgen de Chapi	1–1	1–0	1–3	2–0	0–3	1–1	1–2	2–1	1–0	0–1	0–5	

Updated to match(es) played on 2004. Source: RSSSF
Legend: Blue = home team win; Yellow = draw; Red = away team win.

== See also ==
- 2004 Torneo Descentralizado
- 2004 Copa Perú
