= 2003 Peruvian Segunda División =

Peruvian Segunda División
- Season: 2003
- Dates: 3 May – 25 October 2003
- Champions: Sport Coopsol
- Relegated: América Cochahuayco
- Matches: 156
- Goals: 373 (2.39 per match)
- Top goalscorer: Wilkin Cavero (22 goals)

The 2003 Peruvian Segunda División, the second division of Peruvian football (soccer), was played by 13 teams. The tournament winner, Sport Coopsol, was promoted to the 2004 Torneo Descentralizado. The last place, América Cochahuayco, was relegated. The tournament was played on a home-and-away round-robin basis.

== Teams ==
=== Team changes ===
Promoted from 2002 Liga Provincial de Lima	Promoted to 2003 Primera División	Relegated to 2003 Copa Perú
▲ La Peña Sporting (1st)	▲ Unión Huaral (1st)	▼ Guardia Republicana (14th) ▼ Lawn Tennis (15th) ▼ Bella Esperanza (16th)

=== Stadia and Locations ===
Team	City
AELU	Pueblo Libre, Lima
Alcides Vigo	Barranco, Lima
América Cochahuayco	San Luis, Lima
Deportivo Aviación	Lima
Deportivo Municipal	Cercado de Lima
Defensor Villa del Mar	Villa El Salvador, Lima
La Peña Sporting	Lince, Lima
Olímpico Somos Perú	Surco, Lima
Somos Aduanas	Callao
Sport Coopsol	Lima
Sporting Cristal B	Rímac, Lima
Universidad San Marcos	Cercado de Lima
Virgen de Chapi	Santa Anita, Lima

== League table ==
=== Standings ===
Pos	Team	Pld	W	D	L	GF	GA	GD	Pts	Promotion or relegation
1	Sport Coopsol (C)	24	18	1	5	45	20	+25	55	2004 Primera División
2	Sporting Cristal B (Note: Sporting Cristal B can´t be promoted as they are the "reserve team" of Sporting Cristal which plays in First Division.)	24	14	5	5	40	17	+23	47	
3	Olímpico Somos Perú	24	13	6	5	46	26	+20	45	
4	Deportivo Municipal	24	11	7	6	34	21	+13	40	
5	Defensor Villa del Mar	24	12	4	8	31	20	+11	40	
6	AELU	24	11	7	6	27	21	+6	40	
7	La Peña Sporting	24	9	5	10	27	28	−1	32	
8	Universidad San Marcos	24	8	7	9	22	28	−6	31	
9	Alcides Vigo	24	6	8	10	20	26	−6	26	
10	Somos Aduanas	24	7	3	14	30	38	−8	24	
11	Virgen de Chapi	24	5	5	14	17	34	−17	20	
12	Deportivo Aviación	24	5	5	14	18	41	−23	20	
13	América Cochahuayco (R)	24	5	1	18	16	53	−37	16	2004 Copa Perú

Updated to match(es) played on 2003. Source:
Rules for classification: 1) points; 2) goal difference; 3) number of goals scored.
(C) Champions; (R) Relegated

== Results ==
Home \ Away	AELU	ALC	AME	DVM	DAV	DMU	LPS	OAM	DSA	COO	CRI	USM	VCH
AELU		1–2	3–0	0–0	1–0	1–1	3–2	3–1	1–0	1–2	0–0	2–2	1–1
Alcides Vigo	0–1		1–0	2–0	0–0	0–0	0–0	0–1	0–0	0–2	4–1	2–0	2–2
América Cochahuayco	1–0	2–0		1–3	2–2	1–3	1–4	2–1	0–2	2–3	0–6	0–1	0–1
Defensor Villa del Mar	0–0	2–0	5–0		1–2	0–1	2–0	0–1	3–1	0–2	0–2	1–1	3–0
Deportivo Aviación	1–0	1–1	2–1	0–1		2–2	0–1	1–2	1–3	0–3	1–0	0–1	1–0
Deportivo Municipal	0–1	2–0	5–0	3–2	0–0		4–1	2–1	3–0	2–0	0–1	1–1	0–0
La Peña Sporting	0–0	1–2	1–0	0–1	2–0	2–4		0–1	1–1	2–1	0–0	3–0	2–1
Olímpico Somos Perú	3–1	0–0	3–0	2–2	4–1	0–0	1–1		3–2	1–2	0–0	2–2	0–1
Somos Aduanas	2–0	4–2	0–1	0–1	4–1	1–0	0–2	1–6		2–3	1–2	3–1	1–2
Sport Coopsol	0–1	2–0	2–0	0–1	5–0	2–0	1–0	0–4	2–1		1–0	3–2	3–0
Sporting Cristal B	2–3	2–1	3–0	1–0	3–1	4–0	2–0	2–3	2–1	1–1		0–0	2–0
Universidad San Marcos	0–1	1–0	2–1	1–2	1–0	1–0	2–0	1–2	0–0	0–3	0–2		0–0
Virgen de Chapi	1–2	1–1	0–1	0–1	3–1	0–1	1–2	2–4	1–0	0–2	0–2	0–2	

Updated to match(es) played on 2003. Source: RSSSF
Legend: Blue = home team win; Yellow = draw; Red = away team win.

== See also ==
- 2003 Torneo Descentralizado
- 2003 Copa Perú
