= José Carlos Fernández (Peruvian footballer) =

Peruvian footballer (born 1983)

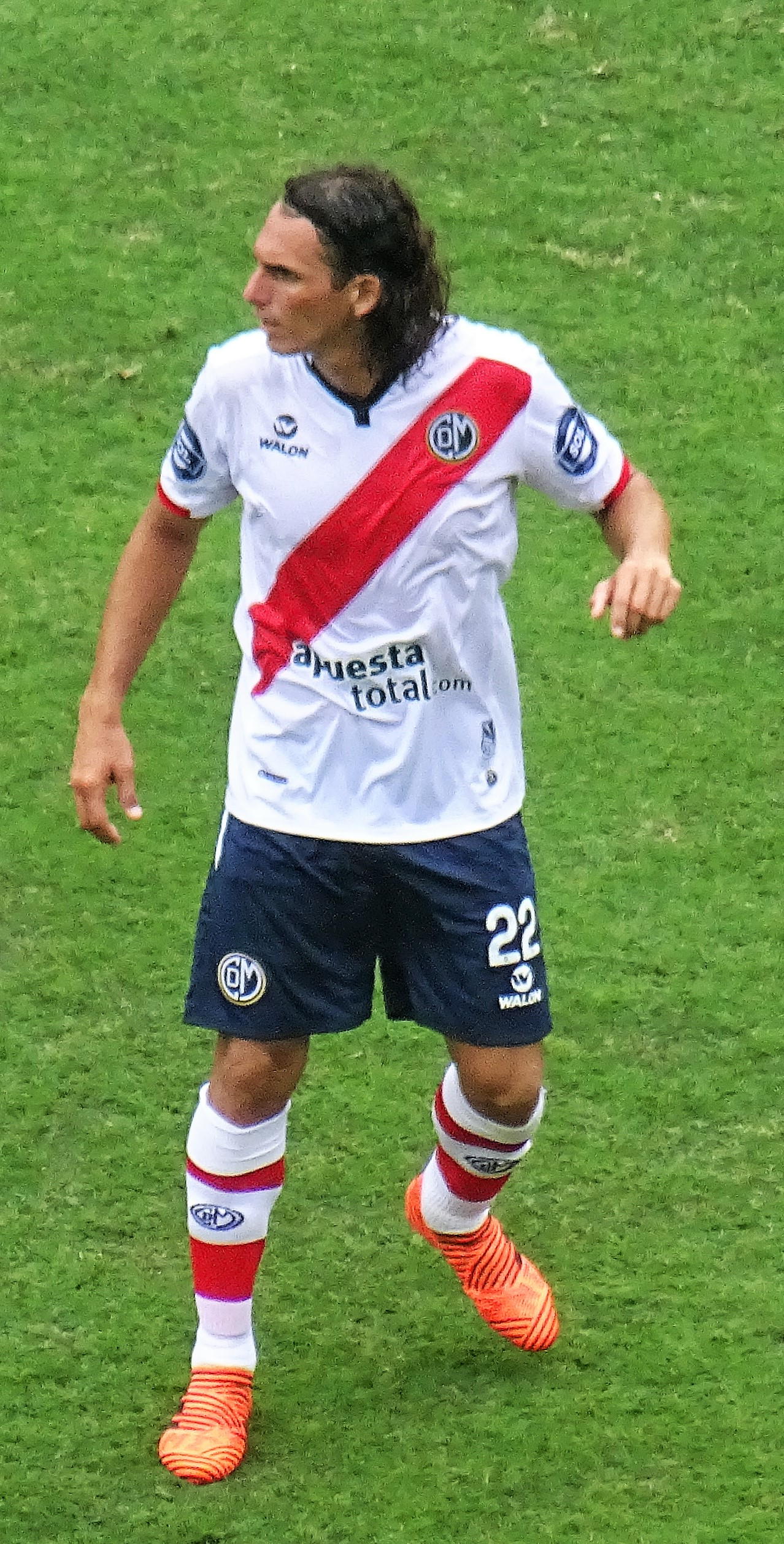

Personal information
- Full name: José Carlos Fernández Piedra
- Date of birth: 14 May 1983 (age 43)
- Place of birth: Trujillo, Peru
- Height: 1.88 m (6 ft 2 in)
- Position: Forward

Team information
- Current team: Carlos A. Mannucci
- Number: 22

Youth career
- 2000: Taller de Laredo
- 2001: Los Turcos FC
- 2002: Taller de Laredo

Senior career*
Years	Team	Apps	(Gls)
2002	Sport Coopsol Trujillo	10	(1)
2003	Sport Coopsol	15	(3)
2004	Universidad San Martin	6	(3)
2005	CD Universidad César Vallejo	26	(3)
2006	Melgar	38	(5)
2007	Coronel Bolognesi	12	(2)
2007	Cienciano	21	(12)
2008	Chornomorets Odesa	2	(0)
2008–2009	Cercle Brugge	7	(1)
2009–2010	Alianza Lima	51	(18)
2010–2011	Deportivo Quito	13	(4)
2011–2012	Alianza Lima	17	(9)
2012–2014	Argentinos Juniors	7	(0)
2013	→ Sporting Cristal (on loan)	27	(5)
2014	Real Garcilaso	12	(0)
2015	CD Universidad César Vallejo	16	(3)
2016–2017	Melgar	33	(4)
2017–2018	Deportivo Municipal	54	(15)
2019	Sport Huancayo	8	(1)
2019–	Carlos A. Mannucci	85	(13)

International career
2010–2012	Peru	6	(2)
- * Club domestic league appearances and goals as of 18:40, 24 May 2020 (UTC)

José Carlos "Zlatan" Fernández Piedra (born 14 May 1983 in Trujillo, Peru) is a Peruvian footballer who plays as a center forward for Peruvian Primera División club Carlos A. Mannucci.

He is nicknamed "Zlatan" because of his physical resemblance to Swedish footballer Zlatan Ibrahimović.

== Club career ==
Fernández began his playing career in early 2000 with local club Defensor Taller de Laredo. Then in 2002 he transferred to Sport Coopsol Trujillo. Fernández made his official debut in the Torneo Descentralizado on 22 September 2002 in round 11 of the 2002 Torneo Clausura. His debut match was played at home in the Mansiche Stadium against Coronel Bolognesi, which ended in a 4–0 loss for Coopsol Trujillo. José Carlos scored his first official goal in the Descentralizado on 1 December 2002 in a league match against Alianza Atlético in round 21 of the Clausura season. He scored in the 80th minute, but it was not enough as Alianza Atlético won 4–2 in Trujillo. He finished his first season in the top-flight with 15 appearances and 3 goals. However, Coopsol Trujillo finished in 12th place and were relegated to the Copa Perú division.

Then in 2003 he joined Lima based club Sport Coopsol, which at the time was participating in the Peruvian Second Division. There he would win his first silverware as he helped Sport Coopsol win the 2003 Peruvian Second Division championship. Sport Coopsol won promotion to the First Division but instead decided to sell their spot to newly formed club Club Deportivo Universidad de San Martín de Porres. As a result, Fernández transferred to Universidad San Martín for the 2004 Torneo Descentralizado season.

He then went on to have stints at 4 other Peruvian clubs: Club Deportivo Universidad César Vallejo, FBC Melgar, Coronel Bolognesi, and Cienciano. He spent two years playing in Europe. First with the Ukrainian team FC Chornomorets Odesa, where he stayed 4 months, playing in 2 games and totaling 19 minutes. Then on 30 May 2008, Fernández signed a contract with Cercle Brugge, which ended on 10 February 2009. It was announced at the same time that Fernández moved back to his home country, to play for Alianza Lima. He played in the 2012 Copa Libertadores and scored decisive goals for his club.

Finally, in October he played for the Argentine club Argentinos Juniors. Unfortunately he didn't make any goal because he had a serious injury that left him for several months. In 2013, he moved to the Peruvian team Sporting Cristal to play the 2013 Copa Libertadores and Peruvian First Division.

== International goals ==
#	Date	Venue	Opponent	Score	Result	Competition
1	4 September 2010	Toronto	Canada	2–0	Win	Friendly
2	7 September 2010	Fort Lauderdale	Jamaica	2–1	Win	Friendly

== Honours ==
=== Club ===
Sport Coopsol:

- Peruvian Second Division: 2003

Carlos A. Mannucci

- Copa Bicentenario; Runner Up 2021
