= Carlos Barrena =

Peruvian footballer (born 1982)

Personal information
- Full name: Carlos Alberto Barrena Fabián
- Date of birth: 24 April 1982 (age 44)
- Place of birth: Iquitos, Peru
- Height: 1.58 m (5 ft 2 in)
- Position: Attacking midfielder

Team information
- Current team: Los Caimanes

Senior career*
Years	Team	Apps	(Gls)
2002–2004	Virgen de Chapi		
2005	Olímpico Somos Perú		
2005–2006	Sport Áncash		
2007–2008	Olímpico Aurora		
2008–2011	Colegio Nacional Iquitos	114	(7)
2012–2013	José Gálvez	41	(2)
2013	Los Caimanes	5	(0)
2014	Real Garcilaso	0	(0)
2014	Alianza Universidad	11	(2)
2015	Comerciantes Unidos	17	(1)
2016	Los Caimanes	22	(1)
2017	Deportivo Coopsol	11	(1)
2018	Sport Loreto	23	(6)
2019–	Los Caimanes	7	(1)
- * Club domestic league appearances and goals as of 01:19, 7 February 2020 (UTC)

Carlos Alberto Barrena Fabián (born 24 April 1982) is a Peruvian professional footballer who plays as an attacking midfielder for Los Caimanes.

== Club career ==
Barrena joined Colegio Nacional Iquitos in July 2008, which at the time was competing in the Copa Perú division.

He made his debut for Colegio Nacional Iquitos in the 2008 Copa Perú season and scored his first goal for them in a 2–2 draw against Cobresol FBC for the final group stage of the competition. At the end of the 2008 Copa Perú season he helped his hometown club win promotion to the Peruvian First Division.

Barrena made his Peruvian First Division debut with Colegio Nacional Iquitos colors on 14 February 2009 in Round 1 of the 2009 Descentralizado season against Sporting Cristal. Barrena played the entire match and helped his club earn a point at home against the runners-up of the previous season.
