= 1999 Peruvian Segunda División =

Peruvian Segunda División
- Season: 1999
- Dates: 12 June – 6 November 1999
- Champions: América Cochahuayco
- Runner up: Sporting Cristal B

The 1999 Peruvian Segunda División, the second division of Peruvian football (soccer), was played by 12 teams. The tournament winner, América Cochahuayco was promoted to the Playoff. The tournament was played on a home-and-away round-robin basis.

The club Metor–Junín withdrew before the start the season due to financial problems.

== Teams ==
=== Team changes ===
Relegated from 1998 Primera División	Promoted from 1998 Liga Provincial de Lima	Promoted from 1998 Liga Departamental de Lima	Relegated to 1999 Copa Perú	Retired
▼ Lawn Tennis (12th)	▲ Aviación-FAP (1st)	▲ Telefunken 20 (1st)	▼ Deportivo Zuñiga (11th)	▼ Meteor–Junín (Retired)

=== Stadia and Locations ===
Team	City
AELU	Pueblo Libre, Lima
Alcides Vigo	Barranco, Lima
América Cochahuayco	San Luis, Lima
Aviación-FAP	Lima
Bella Esperanza	Cerro Azul, Lima
Guardia Republicana	La Molina, Lima
Hijos de Yurimaguas	Callao
Lawn Tennis	Jesús María, Lima
Sporting Cristal B	Rímac, Lima
Telefunken 20	Huaral
Unión Huaral	Huaral
Virgen de Chapi	Santa Anita, Lima

== League table ==
=== Standings ===
Pos	Team	Pld	W	D	L	GF	GA	GD	Pts	Qualification
1	América Cochahuayco (C)	22	15	5	2	42	17	+25	50	Promotion play-off
2	Sporting Cristal B (Note: Sport Agustino changed its name to Sporting Cristal B. Sporting Cristal B can´t be promoted as they are the "reserve team" of Sporting Cristal which plays in First Division.)	22	12	8	2	38	11	+27	44	
3	Alcides Vigo	22	11	5	6	35	22	+13	38	
4	Aviación-FAP	22	10	8	4	29	26	+3	38	
5	AELU	22	9	6	7	33	22	+11	33	
6	Lawn Tennis	22	8	7	7	22	22	0	31	
7	Hijos de Yurimaguas	21	6	6	9	18	23	−5	24	
8	Virgen de Chapi	22	7	4	11	17	24	−7	25	
9	Telefunken 20	22	6	5	11	14	30	−16	23	
10	Unión Huaral	22	3	9	10	12	22	−10	18	
11	Bella Esperanza	21	4	6	11	18	33	−15	18	
12	Guardia Republicana	22	3	5	14	10	36	−26	14	

Updated to match(es) played on 1999. Source:
Rules for classification: 1) points; 2) goal difference; 3) number of goals scored.
(C) Champions

== Results ==
Home \ Away	AELU	ALC	AME	DAV	BEL	GUA	HIJ	LAW	CRI	TEL	HUA	VCH
AELU		0–1	1–1	1–2	2–0	1–0	2–3	2–2	2–2	4–0	0–0	2–0
Alcides Vigo	2–0		2–1	2–2	6–2	1–2	3–1	4–1	0–0	5–0	3–0	0–2
América Cochahuayco	3–3	0–0		0–0	3–0	3–0	2–1	1–0	2–2	4–0	2–1	3–1
Aviación-FAP	2–2	1–1	0–1		2–2	2–2	0–2	1–0	1–2	3–2	2–1	3–2
Bella Esperanza	0–2	4–1	0–3	0–2		3–0	—	0–1	0–0	0–1	0–0	0–1
Guardia Republicana	0–3	0–1	1–3	0–2	1–1		0–0	0–3	0–2	0–1	0–1	1–0
Hijos de Yurimaguas	0–1	2–0	0–3	1–1	0–1	0–0		1–2	1–2	1–0	2–1	0–0
Lawn Tennis	1–0	0–0	1–3	0–0	3–1	1–0	1–2		0–2	0–1	2–2	1–1
Sporting Cristal B	0–1	2–0	3–0	5–0	3–1	6–0	2–0	1–1		0–0	0–0	3–1
Telefunken 20	2–1	0–1	0–1	0–1	1–1	1–3	0–0	0–0	0–1		1–2	1–0
Unión Huaral	1–0	1–2	1–2	0–1	0–0	0–0	0–0	0–1	0–0	1–2		0–2
Virgen de Chapi	0–3	1–0	0–1	0–1	1–2	1–0	2–1	0–1	1–0	1–1	0–0	

Updated to match(es) played on 1999. Source: RSSSF
Legend: Blue = home team win; Yellow = draw; Red = away team win.

== Promotion play-off ==
19 December 1999
11:30

Deportivo Pesquero	2–2	América Cochahuayco
José Espinoza 60'; Carlos Silvera 61'		Oswaldo Carrión 45'; Carlos Ibarra 72'
Penalties
Luis Molina (penalty scored); José Espinoza (penalty scored); Wilmer Ricardi (penalty missed); Juan Manuel Olivares (penalty scored); Carlos Silvera (penalty scored)	4–3	Juan Iriarte (penalty missed); Giancarlo Sarnia (penalty scored); Roberto Valenzuela (penalty scored); José Laurie (penalty missed); John Galliquio (penalty scored)

Estadio Nacional, Lima
Attendance: 3,472
Referee: Jorge Torres

Deportivo Pesquero remained in Primera División

== See also ==
- 1999 Torneo Descentralizado
- 1999 Copa Perú
