= Coopsol =

Coopsol may refer to:

- Deportivo Coopsol, Peruvian football club based in Lima, founded in 1964
- Sport Coopsol, Peruvian football club based in Lima, founded in 2000
- Sport Coopsol Trujillo, Peruvian football club based in Trujillo, founded in 1995
