= Región IX Metropolitana =

- Founded: 1975
- Folded: 1991
- Country: Peru
- Confederation: CONMEBOL
- Level on pyramid: 3-4 (1975–1991)
- Promotion to: Primera División; Intermedia B
- Relegation to: Liga Mayor de Fútbol de Lima

The Región IX Metropolitana, was a football (soccer) tournament founded in 1975. It was created as the last stage after the Liga Mayor de Fútbol de Lima.1 It was a system made up of teams from the Lima capital.

== History ==
The FPF made changes to Peruvian football competitions in 1973. Among them the elimination of the Peruvian Segunda División. Later, in 1975, the Liga Mayor de Fútbol de Lima and the Región IX Metropolitana were created.

The Región IX Metropolitana, was a final group of the best representatives of the teams from the capital, for their classification to the regional or national stage of the Copa Perú. It was the final phase after the Liga Mayor de Fútbol de Lima. The number of teams varied by season, between 6 and 8 teams.

With the implementation of the Intermedia, promotion was offered to Intermedia B and the National Stage to the Copa Perú between 1984 and 1988.

Finally, in 1992, the Región IX Metropolitana was eliminated and replaced by the Región Promocional de Lima y Callao and years later, by the Interligas de Lima championship.

== Clarification ==
- The Liga Mayor de Fútbol de Lima and Región IX Metropolitana, from 1975 to 1986, acted as different competitions. The best teams from the district stage entered the Liga Myaor. Later, the best ranked teams participated in Region IX. There they faced the teams from the capital that participated in the regional or national stage of the previous season.
- In 1987, the Liga Mayor disappeared, but its teams participated in the Región IX Metropolitana. However, for many newspapers of the time, both competitions merged into one with the name Liga Mayor de Lima - Region IX. It remained in force until 1990.
- The Región Promocional de Lima y Callao, was a promotion competition system that is different from the Liga Mayor de Lima and the Región IX Metropolitana. Because the Callao teams were incorporated into the format. At that time, the teams from Lima and Callao had a different promotion route than the rest of the teams in the Copa Peru.

== Champions ==
=== Región IX Metropolitana ===
Ed.	Season	Champion
1	1976–77	Universidad Federico Villareal
2	1977–78	Deportivo Bancoper
3	1978–79	Papelera Atlas
4	1979–80	Unión González Prada
5	1980–81	Barcelona (Surquillo)
6	1981–82	Unión González Prada
7	1982–83	Barcelona (Surquillo)
8	1983–84	ETE
9	1984–85	Guardia Republicana
10	1985–86	Esther Grande de Bentín
11	1986–87	Real Olímpico
12	1987 Serie A	Enrique Lau Chun
12	1987 Serie B	Defensor Kiwi
13	1988 Serie A	Mercado Mayorista
13	1988 Serie B	Juventud Huascarán
14	1989 Serie A	Cosmos 2000
14	1989 Serie B	Textil San Pedro
15	1990 Serie A	Alcides Vigo
15	1990 Serie B	Centro Iqueño
16	1991 Serie A	América Cochahuayco
16	1991 Serie B	San José Joyeros
Defunct Tournament

Región Promocional de Lima y Callao
- Founded: 1992
- Folded: 1996
- Country: Peru
- Confederation: CONMEBOL
- Level on pyramid: 3 (1992–1996)
- Promotion to: Segunda División
- Relegation to: Ligas Distritales de Lima y Callao

=== Región Promocional de Lima y Callao ===
Ed.	Season	Champion
1	1992 Lima - Serie A	Defensor San Juan
1	1992 Lima - Serie B	Humberto Valle
1	1992 Callao	Los Amigos
2	1993 Serie A	Mixto Estudiantil
2	1993 Serie B	José Carlos Mariátegui
3	1994 Serie A	Deportivo Municipal (Chorrillos)
3	1994 Serie B	Sport Agustino
4	1995 Serie A	Real San Isidro
4	1995 Serie B	Somos Aduanas
4	1995 Serie C	Deportivo Chabros
4	1995 Serie D	Santa María Norte
5	1996 Serie A	Deportivo Repcel
5	1996 Serie B	AELU
Defunct Tournament (See: Liga Provincial de Lima (Interligas de Lima))

==== Additional Information ====
- The Real San Isidro club later changed its name to Virgen de Chapi.
- The full name of Contumaza Repcel is Deportivo Contumaza Repcel.
- In 1994, Club Deportivo Cadet, from Surquillo, qualified as the best third-place team for the regional stage of the Copa Perú. However, it was eliminated. Nevertheless, the club gained access to the Región Promocional de Lima y Callao in 1995.
