= 2004 Sporting Cristal season =

Sporting Cristal
2004 season
- Stadium: San Martín de Porres, Lima
- Torneo Descentralizado: Torneo Apertura: Fourth (4°); Torneo Clausura: First (1°) Champion; Aggregate Table: Third (3°); Final National: Runner-up (2°); Runner-up National (2°)
Home colours	Away colours	Third colours

The 2004 Sporting Cristal season were the Forty-Nineth (49.º) of the club from its foundation in 1955, Forty-Nine (49) participations consecutives in the top-flight of Peruvian Primera División (of 88 Editions) with denomination Torneo Descentralizado. In Previous Season the club qualified as Runner-up National 2nd Place of the 2003 Torneo Descentralizado.

Sporting Cristal were a of fourteen (14) clubs in the Thirty-Nineth edition (39.º) Torneo Descentralizado, the competition most important of the Peruvian football. The club played the Peruvian Primera División and Copa Libertadores for Twenty-Fourth (24th) Time.

== Torneo Descentralizado ==
=== Torneo Apertura ===
Pos	Team	Pld	W	D	L	GF	GA	GD	Pts
3	Alianza Atlético	26	15	5	6	46	29	+17	50
4	Sporting Cristal	26	13	6	7	50	24	+26	45
5	Universitario	26	11	8	7	31	25	+6	41

== See also ==
- Club Sporting Cristal
- 2004 Torneo Descentralizado
