= Roberto Salazar (footballer) =

Peruvian footballer (born 1973)

Personal information
- Full name: Roberto Carlos Salazar Shimabukuro
- Date of birth: 10 September 1973 (age 53)
- Place of birth: Lima, Peru
- Height: 1.68 m (5 ft 6 in)
- Position: Forward

Youth career
- Deportivo AELU

Senior career*
Years	Team	Apps	(Gls)
1991–1993	Deportivo AELU		
1994–1996	San Agustín		
1997	Deportivo Yurimaguas	?	(23)
1998	Lawn Tennis FC	?	(5)
1999–2000	Sporting Cristal	?	(0)
2001	Deportivo AELU	?	(17)
2010–2014	Deportivo AELU		
- * Club domestic league appearances and goals

Roberto Carlos Salazar Shimabukuro (born on 10 September 1973) is a Peruvian professional footballer who played as forward.

== Playing career ==
Roberto Salazar was developed at Deportivo AELU, a youth academy for Peruvian players of Japanese descent. He was promoted to the first team in 1991 but never got the chance to make his debut in the first division. It was not until he signed with San Agustín that he made his league debut on 20 February 1994, in a 1–3 defeat against León de Huánuco. He remained with San Agustín until 1996 when the club was relegated to the second division.

In 1997, he was recruited by Deportivo Yurimaguas and finished the season as the second division's top scorer with 23 goals. This led to his being recruited by Lawn Tennis FC, newly promoted to the first division, in 1998. In 1999, he signed with Sporting Cristal and played there for two seasons. He had the opportunity to play in the 1999 Copa Libertadores (5 matches, 1 goal). With the arrival of Juan Carlos Oblitas as Sporting Cristal's coach in 2000, he lost his starting position and was forced to change clubs. Thus, in 2001, he returned to his boyhood club, Deportivo AELU. He was crowned top scorer in the second division championship for the second time.

After leaving for Japan at the end of 2001, he returned to Peru and signed with Deportivo AELU one last time in 2010, where he played until 2014.

== Honours ==
Hijos de Yurimaguas

- Peruvian Segunda División Top scorer: 1997 (23 goals)

Deportivo AELU

- Peruvian Segunda División Top scorer: 2001 (17 goals)
