= 1998 Peruvian Segunda División =

Peruvian Segunda División
- Season: 1998
- Champions: Hijos de Yurimaguas
- Runner up: Alcides Vigo
- Relegated: Deportivo Zuñiga
- Matches: 55
- Goals: 132 (2.4 per match)

The 1998 Peruvian Segunda División, the second division of Peruvian football (soccer), as Deportivo UPAO declined to participate only 11 teams took part in this tournament. Only 1 leg of matches was played as the tournament was delayed because of some problems. The tournament winner, Hijos de Yurimaguas was promoted to the Playoff.

== Teams ==
=== Team changes ===
Relegated from 1997 Primera División	Promoted from 1997 Liga Provincial de Lima	Promoted to 1998 Primera División	Relegated to 1998 Copa Perú
▼ Alcides Vigo (11th)	▲ Virgen de Chapi (1st)	▲ Lawn Tennis (1st)	▼ San Agustín (11th) ▼ Unión Supe (12th) ▼ Defensor Lima (13th) ▼ Ciclista Lima (14th)

=== Stadia and Locations ===
Team	City
AELU	Pueblo Libre, Lima
Alcides Vigo	Barranco, Lima
América Cochahuayco	San Luis, Lima
Bella Esperanza	Cerro Azul, Lima
Deportivo Zúñiga	La Molina, Lima
Guardia Republicana	La Molina, Lima
Hijos de Yurimaguas	Callao
Metor–Junín	Lima
Sport Agustino	El Agustino, Lima
Unión Huaral	Huaral
Virgen de Chapi	Santa Anita, Lima

== League table ==
=== Standings ===
Pos	Team	Pld	W	D	L	GF	GA	GD	Pts	Qualification or relegation
1	Hijos de Yurimaguas (C)	10	7	0	3	14	8	+6	21	Promotion play-off
2	Alcides Vigo	10	6	2	2	15	6	+9	20	
3	AELU	10	5	4	1	15	6	+9	19	
4	Metor–Junín	10	5	2	3	9	10	−1	17	
5	Guardia Republicana	10	5	0	5	9	10	−1	15	
6	Sport Agustino	10	3	3	4	14	12	+2	12	
7	Bella Esperanza	10	3	2	5	18	37	−19	11	
8	Unión Huaral	10	3	2	5	9	14	−5	11	
9	América Cochahuayco	10	2	4	4	11	14	−3	10	
10	Virgen de Chapi (O)	10	2	2	6	10	16	−6	8	Relegation play-off
11	Deportivo Zúñiga (R)	10	1	5	4	8	11	−3	8	Relegation play-off

Updated to match(es) played on 1998. Source:
Rules for classification: 1) points; 2) goal difference; 3) number of goals scored.
(C) Champions; (O) Play-off winners; (R) Relegated

== Results ==
Home \ Away	AELU	AVI	AME	BES	ZUÑ	GR	HIJ	MET	SAG	HUA	VCH
AELU		1–1	2–2	4–0			3–0	0–0	1–0	1–0	1–2
Alcides Vigo			1–0	1–0		0–1		4–0			2–1
América Cochahuayco					2–1	1–0					
Bella Esperanza			2–2			0–1		2–0			
Deportivo Zúñiga	0–0	1–1		2–1						2–2	1–2
Guardia Republicana	1–2				2–1		0–2				2–1
Hijos de Yurimaguas		1–0	3–0	2–0	1–0			1–2			2–0
Metor–Junín			1–0		0–0	0–2			2–1	2–0	2–0
Sport Agustino		0–2	3–2	2–2	0–0	1–0	1–2			5–0	
Unión Huaral		1–3	0–0	0–1		2–0	1–0				
Virgen de Chapi			1–1	0–1					1–1	2–3	

Updated to match(es) played on unknown. Source: 1998
Legend: Blue = home team win; Yellow = draw; Red = away team win.

== Relegation play-off ==
Virgen de Chapi	3–3	Deportivo Zúñiga
Penalties
	6–5

== Promotion play-off ==
20 December 1998
15:00

Deportivo Municipal	4–1 (a.e.t.)	Hijos de Yurimaguas
Ronald Baroni 34' 100' 113'; Paolo Maldonado 119'		Benjamín Rodríguez 64'

Estadio Nacional, Lima
Attendance: 5,000
Referee: José Arana
Deportivo Municipal remained in Primera División

== See also ==
- 1998 Torneo Descentralizado
- 1998 Copa Perú
