= Jerry Tamashiro =

Peruvian-Japanese footballer (born 1971) Lima-Peru

Personal information
- Date of birth: 18 March 1971 (age 55)
- Place of birth: Lima, Peru
- Height: 1.70 m (5 ft 7 in)
- Position: Forward

Senior career*
| Years | Team | Apps | (Gls) |
| 1989 | Deportivo AELU | | |
| 1990 | Universitario | | |
| 1991 | Defensor Lima | | |
| 1992–1994 | Mannucci | | |
| 1994–1996 | Deportivo Municipal | | |
| 1997 | Alianza Lima | | |
| 1998 | Miami Fusion | 12 | (3) |
| 1999 | Juan Aurich | | |
| 2000 | Deportivo Aviación | | |
| 2001 | Deportivo Municipal | | |

International career
- Peru U17
- Peru U20
- Peru U23
- * Club domestic league appearances and goals

Jerry Tamashiro (born 18 March 1971) is a former Peruvian-Japanese footballer who played as a forward.

== Career statistics ==
=== Club ===
| Club | Season | League | | | Cup | | Continental | | Other | | Total | |
| Club | Season | Division | Apps | Goals | Apps | Goals | Apps | Goals | Apps | Goals | Apps | Goals |
|---|---|---|---|---|---|---|---|---|---|---|---|---|
| Miami Fusion | 1998 | MLS | 12 | 3 | 0 | 0 | 0 | 0 | 0 | 0 | 12 | 3 |
| Career total | | | 12 | 3 | 0 | 0 | 0 | 0 | 0 | 0 | 12 | 3 |
