= Rodolfo Ojeda =

Peruvian footballer (born 1982)

Personal information
- Full name: Luis Rodolfo Ojeda Alva
- Date of birth: 28 November 1982 (age 43)
- Place of birth: Chancay, Peru
- Height: 1.71 m (5 ft 7 in)
- Position: Midfielder

Senior career*
| Years | Team | Apps | (Gls) |
| –2003 | Bella Esperanza | | |
| 2003–2005 | Olímpico Somos Perú | | |
| 2006 | La Loretana | | |
| 2007 | UT Cajamarca | | |
| 2008 | La Loretana | 29 | (3) |
| 2009 | Sporting Cristal | 0 | (0) |
| 2009 | Colegio Nacional Iquitos | 19 | (0) |
| 2010 | Sport Boys | 16 | (0) |
| 2011 | Cienciano | 1 | (0) |
- * Club domestic league appearances and goals as of 24 March 2012

Luis Rodolfo Ojeda Alva (born 28 November 1982) is a Peruvian former professional footballer who played as a midfielder.

== Club career ==
From 2007 to 2008, Ojeda played for Atlético Minero along with his brother Román Ojeda in the Peruvian First Division. In 2009, he transferred, along with his brother to Sporting Cristal.
