= Diego Espinoza (footballer) =

Peruvian footballer (born 2001)

Personal information
- Full name: Diego Alberto Espinoza Atoche
- Date of birth: January 30, 2001 (age 25)
- Place of birth: Lima, Peru
- Height: 1.71 m (5 ft 7 in)
- Position: Winger

Team information
- Current team: Deportivo Coopsol
- Number: 20

Youth career
- Alianza Lima

Senior career*
Years	Team	Apps	(Gls)
2019–2021	Alianza Lima	0	(0)
2020	→ Ayacucho (loan)	12	(1)
2021	→ Universidad San Martín (loan)	0	(0)
2021	→ Cusco (loan)	11	(0)
2022	Universidad San Martín	21	(1)
2023	Ayacucho	22	(3)
2023–2024	Santos de Nasca	21	(2)
2025	Deportivo Coopsol	13	(1)
2026	Inter FA	17	(1)
- * Club domestic league appearances and goals as of 20:10, 26 October 2025 (UTC)

Diego Alberto Espinoza Atoche (born 30 January 2001) is a Peruvian footballer who plays as a winger for Peruvian Segunda División side Deportivo Coopsol.

== Career ==
=== Club career ===
On 5 March 2019, 18-year old Espinoza signed his first professional contract with Alianza Lima. However, he only played for the club's reserve team in the 2019 season, including one game on the bench for the first team in the Peruvian Primera División. Therefore, he was loaned out to Ayacucho FC in 2020, to gain some experience.

He made his Ayacucho- and Peruvian Primera División on 2 February 2020 against Universidad San Martín. Espinoza started on the bench, before replacing Carlos Olascuaga in the 61st minute.

In January 2021, Espinoza was loaned out to Universidad San Martín for the 2021 season. However, he wasn't used at all at San Martín, and on 5 July 2021, he was instead loaned out to Cusco FC, for the rest of the year.

On 2 February 2022, Espinoza returned to Universidad San Martín, this time on a permanent deal. A year later, he moved to Peruvian Segunda División side Ayacucho FC. In March 2024, Espinoza signed for Santos de Nasca.

In March 2025, Espinoza moved to Deportivo Coopsol.
