= Liga Mayor de Fútbol de Lima =

- Founded: 1976
- Folded: 1986
- Country: Peru
- Confederation: CONMEBOL
- Level on pyramid: 2 (1976–1982); 3-4 (1983–1986)
- Promotion to: Segunda División; Región IX Metropolitana
- Relegation to: Ligas Distritales de Lima
- Most championships: Barcelona (Surquillo); Deportivo Bancoper; Unión González Prada (2 titles)

The Liga Mayor de Fútbol de Lima, the second division of Peruvian football (soccer) from 1976 until 1982. Later it played the role between a third to fourth category, below the intermediate and second division.

== History ==
Liga Mayor de Fútbol de Lima was a championship of the Province of Lima created in 1976 by the Peruvian Football Federation and remained in force until 1986. Later, it became a precursor championship of the Región IX Metropolitana. Initially it played the role of second category (tournament within the Copa Peru system) until 1984, the year that the second professional category returned.

In 1987, the foundations of Peruvian football were modified again. Liga Mayor de Fútbol de Lima disappeared. The teams that maintained their category and those teams from the capital that were relegated from the first professional league were absorbed and affiliated with the Región IX Metropolitana. However, according to most media outlets at the time, both leagues were merged.

== Champions ==
Ed.	Season	Champion	Runner-up
1	1976	Compañía Peruana de Teléfonos	Deportivo Bancoper
2	1977	Deportivo Bancoper	
3	1978	Barcelona (Surquillo)	
4	1979	Unión González Prada	
5	1980	Deportivo Bancoper	
6	1981	Unión González Prada	
7	1982	Barcelona (Surquillo)	
8	1983 Serie A	Guardia Republicana	
8	1983 Serie B	Aurora Miraflores	
9	1984 Serie A	Confecciones Ídolo	
9	1984 Serie B	Defensor Kiwi	
10	1985 Serie A	Defensor Rímac	
10	1985 Serie B	Papelera Atlas	
11	1986 Serie A	Mercado Mayorista	
11	1986 Serie B	Defensor Rímac	
Defunct Tournament

== Clarification ==
- The Liga Mayor de Fútbol de Lima and Región IX Metropolitana, from 1975 to 1986, acted as different competitions. The best teams from the district stage entered the Liga Mayor. Later, the best ranked teams participated in Region IX. There they faced the teams from the capital that participated in the regional or national stage of the previous season.
- In 1987, the Liga Mayor disappeared, but its teams participated in the Región IX Metropolitana. However, for many newspapers of the time, both competitions merged into one with the name Liga Mayor de Lima - Region IX. It remained in force until 1990.
