= Alcides Vigo =

- Full name: Club Alcides Vigo Hurtado
- Nickname: "Los Policias" (The Cops)
- Founded: 1986
- Ground: Estadio UNI, Lima
- Capacity: 25,000
- League: Copa Perú
Home colours	Away colours

Alcides Vigo is a Peruvian football club, playing in the city of Lima. It is named after a hero of the Peruvian police who was killed in the line of duty, hence its nickname Los policiales ("the cops").

== History ==
The club was formally founded on 27 November 1986, although a namesake club had been playing in the second division since 1983 and won the championship in 1985. Alcides Vigo won two more second division championships in 1996 and 2001.

The club have played at the highest level of Peruvian football on one occasion, in the 1997 Torneo Descentralizado: Led by Luis Roth, the club signed some experienced players such as Sergio Salazar, Raúl Mejía, Rivelino Muñoz, Pavel Villavicencio, and Raúl Hurtado. They started well, securing a 0-0 draw away against Universitario de Deportes. Things became more complicated after that, and despite some reinforcements, including the arrival of Brazilians Eduardo Esidio and Rosinaldo Lopes, and a coaching change with Sabino Bártoli as the new manager, the club was relegated to the second division at the end of the season.

In the 2004 Segunda División Peruana, the club was relegated to the Copa Perú and has remained inactive since 2009.

== Honours ==
=== National ===
- Peruvian Segunda División:

Winners (3): 1985, 1996, 2001
Runner-up (2): 1998, 2000

=== Regional ===
- Liga Mayor de Fútbol de Lima:

Winners (1): 1991

- Liga Provincial de Lima:

Winners (1): 1991

- Liga Distrital de Barranco:

Winners (1): 1982

== See also ==
- List of football clubs in Peru
- Peruvian football league system
