= 2004 Torneo Descentralizado =

Torneo Descentralizado
- Season: 2004
- Dates: 28 February 2004 – 29 December 2004
- Champions: Alianza Lima; 21st Primera División title
- Runner up: Sporting Cristal
- Relegated: Deportivo Wanka; Grau–Estudiantes
- Copa Libertadores: Alianza Lima; Sporting Cristal; Cienciano
- Copa Sudamericana: Alianza Atlético; Universitario
- Top goalscorer: Gabriel Garcia (35 goals)

The 2004 Torneo Descentralizado (known as the Copa Cable Mágico for sponsorship reasons) was the eighty-eighth season of Peruvian football. A total of 14 teams competed in the tournament, with Alianza Lima as the defending champion. Alianza Lima won its twenty-first Primera División title after beating Sporting Cristal in the final playoff.

== Changes from 2003 ==
=== Structural changes ===
The number of teams for the 2004 season grew from 12 to 14. The relegation system was re-introduced but the system was determined by a points per match average. The qualification for the Copa Sudamericana was determined by the aggregate table instead of the Torneo Apertura playoffs. Due to a structure change in the Copa Libertadores, only two teams will qualify directly to the group stage (the half-year champions) and the best-placed non-champion will have to play in the first stage.

=== Promotion and relegation ===
No teams were relegated from the 2003 season and thus the number of teams grew from 12 to 14. Segunda División champion Sport Coopsol and Copa Perú 2003 champion Universidad César Vallejo were promoted.

Universidad San Martín bought the promotional place of the 2003 Segunda División winners, Sport Coopsol.

=== Team changes ===
Promoted from 2003 Segunda División	Promoted from 2003 Copa Perú
▲ Sport Coopsol (1st)	▲ Universidad César Vallejo (1st)

== Teams ==
Locations of the 2004 Primera División teams

Team	City	Stadium	Capacity
Alianza Atlético	Sullana	Campeones del 36	8,000
Alianza Lima	Lima	Alejandro Villanueva	35,000
Atlético Universidad	Arequipa	Virgen de Chapi	45,000
Cienciano	Cusco	Garcilaso	42,056
Coronel Bolognesi	Tacna	Jorge Basadre	19,850
Deportivo Wanka	Huancayo	Huancayo	20,000
Grau–Estudiantes	Piura	Miguel Grau	25,000
Melgar	Arequipa	Mariano Melgar	20,000
Sport Boys	Callao	Miguel Grau	15,000
Sporting Cristal	Lima	San Martín de Porres	18,000
Unión Huaral	Huaral	Julio Lores Colan	10,000
Universidad César Vallejo	Trujillo	Mansiche	24,000
Universidad San Martín	Lima	Nacional	18,000
Universitario	Lima	Monumental	80,093

== Torneo Apertura ==
=== Standings ===
Pos	Team	Pld	W	D	L	GF	GA	GD	Pts	Qualification
1	Alianza Lima	26	19	4	3	48	16	+32	61	2005 Copa Libertadores Second Stage
2	Cienciano	26	18	3	5	53	28	+25	57	
3	Alianza Atlético	26	15	5	6	46	29	+17	50	
4	Sporting Cristal	26	13	6	7	50	24	+26	45	
5	Universitario	26	11	8	7	31	25	+6	41	
6	Unión Huaral	26	10	7	9	32	29	+3	37	
7	Universidad César Vallejo	26	9	8	9	24	33	−9	35	
8	Coronel Bolognesi	26	9	3	14	40	44	−4	30	
9	Melgar	26	8	6	12	31	41	−10	30	
10	Grau–Estudiantes	26	7	9	10	21	37	−16	30	
11	Deportivo Wanka	26	7	7	12	28	43	−15	28	
12	Sport Boys	26	6	7	13	28	40	−12	25	
13	Atlético Universidad	26	5	9	12	28	42	−14	24	
14	Universidad San Martín	26	2	4	20	21	50	−29	10	

Updated to match(es) played on May, 2004. Source: Peruvian Football Apertura 2004
Rules for classification: 1) points; 2) goal difference; 3) number of goals scored.

=== Results ===
Home \ Away	AAS	ALI	ATL	CIE	BOL	WAN	EST	MEL	SBA	CRI	HUA	UCV	USM	UNI
Alianza Atlético		1–1	3–2	2–4	1–2	6–1	0–1	2–2	2–0	1–1	1–1	1–0	2–1	2–0
Alianza Lima	2–1		2–0	0–1	3–1	3–0	2–0	4–0	1–0	1–0	2–1	1–0	2–0	1–0
Atlético Universidad	1–2	1–1		2–3	2–0	2–2	3–0	2–0	1–1	0–1	0–2	1–1	1–1	1–1
Cienciano	1–2	1–0	4–0		3–2	2–1	4–0	4–0	4–1	1–0	3–1	2–2	1–0	1–1
Coronel Bolognesi	0–2	2–6	3–2	2–4		4–0	3–0	2–3	3–0	1–3	0–2	4–1	4–1	1–0
Deportivo Wanka	3–1	0–1	3–1	0–3	2–1		4–1	0–0	2–2	1–1	1–1	1–2	2–1	1–1
Grau–Estudiantes	0–1	0–2	0–0	0–1	0–0	2–0		1–0	1–1	1–1	2–1	2–1	2–2	1–0
Melgar	0–1	4–0	0–1	2–0	1–1	1–0	2–2		2–0	2–1	2–3	0–1	3–1	1–1
Sport Boys	2–2	0–1	1–1	1–2	3–1	2–0	0–0	3–1		0–2	3–0	2–2	2–0	1–2
Sporting Cristal	0–1	0–5	3–0	3–0	1–1	1–2	4–0	3–0	4–0		4–2	5–0	3–0	2–2
Unión Huaral	0–2	1–1	4–0	0–2	1–0	0–0	1–1	3–1	2–0	0–0		0–1	1–0	3–1
Universidad César Vallejo	2–1	1–1	0–0	2–1	1–2	1–0	1–2	1–1	0–2	0–3	1–0		1–0	1–1
Universidad San Martín	1–3	1–4	2–4	1–1	1–0	0–1	2–2	0–1	3–1	1–3	1–2	0–1		1–2
Universitario	1–3	0–1	2–0	3–0	1–0	3–1	1–0	4–2	1–0	2–1	0–0	0–0	1–0	

Updated to match(es) played on 2004. Source: RSSSF Peru 2004
Legend: Blue = home team win; Yellow = draw; Red = away team win.

== Torneo Clausura ==
=== Standings ===
Pos	Team	Pld	W	D	L	GF	GA	GD	Pts	Qualification
1	Sporting Cristal	26	16	2	8	55	37	+18	50	2005 Copa Libertadores Second Stage
2	Universidad San Martín	26	14	5	7	40	26	+14	47	
3	Cienciano	26	11	11	4	41	26	+15	44	
4	Universitario	26	11	10	5	34	28	+6	43	
5	Alianza Atlético	26	12	6	8	41	34	+7	42	
6	Alianza Lima	26	10	8	8	31	23	+8	38	
7	Unión Huaral	26	10	8	8	35	30	+5	38	
8	Sport Boys	26	10	7	9	38	40	−2	37	
9	Atlético Universidad	26	8	9	9	37	38	−1	33	
10	Melgar	26	9	5	12	47	41	+6	32	
11	Coronel Bolognesi	26	8	6	12	45	42	+3	30	
12	Universidad César Vallejo	26	7	7	12	24	39	−15	28	
13	Deportivo Wanka	26	7	4	15	27	62	−35	22 (Note: Deportivo Wanka were docked 3 points for failing to pay players.)	
14	Grau–Estudiantes	26	3	4	19	19	48	−29	13 (Note: Grau-Estudiantes withdrew from tournament, lost last 4 games by walkover.)	

Updated to match(es) played on December, 2004. Source: Peruvian Football Clausura 2004
Rules for classification: 1) points; 2) goal difference; 3) number of goals scored.

=== Results ===
Home \ Away	AAS	ALI	ATL	CIE	BOL	WAN	EST	MEL	SBA	CRI	HUA	UCV	USM	UNI
Alianza Atlético		1–0	3–2	3–3	1–2	2–0	1–0	3–1	5–0	4–3	2–1	2–1	1–4	0–0
Alianza Lima	3–0		1–0	0–0	0–0	4–0	2–0	0–0	0–1	2–1	1–1	2–1	2–1	0–2
Atlético Universidad	0–0	0–0		4–1	3–0	3–0	3–3	2–2	2–2	1–3	1–1	2–1	2–1	1–0
Cienciano	1–0	2–2	2–2		2–1	0–0	2–0	1–0	6–2	2–2	3–0	4–0	0–0	2–0
Coronel Bolognesi	0–1	1–2	4–0	1–1		7–1	1–0	2–3	4–1	0–1	1–2	4–1	0–0	0–0
Deportivo Wanka	1–0	3–2	2–1	1–0	1–1		2–0	0–2	3–1	2–1	1–1	2–4	0–2	2–2
Grau–Estudiantes	1–3	0–2	1–2	1–0	2–1	2–1		0–2	0–2	0–1	3–3	1–1	0–3	2–3
Melgar	2–4	2–0	2–0	2–3	3–3	5–0	3–0		2–1	1–2	0–1	4–1	4–4	2–2
Sport Boys	1–1	1–0	2–2	1–1	5–2	3–0	1–0	3–2		2–2	3–2	0–1	2–0	0–1
Sporting Cristal	2–0	4–3	1–2	1–2	3–0	6–1	4–2	2–1	1–3		1–0	2–0	1–0	4–2
Unión Huaral	2–1	0–0	4–2	1–1	1–2	3–1	2–0	2–0	1–0	1–2		1–1	0–1	0–1
Universidad César Vallejo	1–1	1–0	1–0	0–1	0–4	3–0	1–1	1–0	1–1	1–0	0–1		1–2	0–0
Universidad San Martín	2–1	1–3	1–0	1–1	5–2	2–1	1–0	2–1	0–0	2–1	0–2	3–0		2–0
Universitario	1–1	0–0	0–0	1–0	3–2	5–2	1–0	2–1	1–0	3–4	2–2	1–1	1–0	

Updated to match(es) played on 2004. Source: RSSSF Peru 2004
Legend: Blue = home team win; Yellow = draw; Red = away team win.

== Final ==
29 December 2004
20:00

Alianza Lima	0–0 (a.e.t.)	Sporting Cristal
Penalties
José Soto (penalty scored); Martín Hidalgo (penalty scored); Juan Jayo (penalty scored); Flavio Maestri (penalty missed); Waldir Sáenz (penalty missed); Marko Ciurlizza (penalty scored); Guillermo Salas (penalty scored)	5–4	(penalty scored) Carlos Zegarra; (penalty missed) Juan Cominges; (penalty scored) Jorge Soto; (penalty missed) José Moisela; (penalty scored) Amilton Prado; (penalty scored) Erick Torres; (penalty missed) Norberto Araujo

Estadio Nacional, Lima
Attendance: 39,328
Referee: Manuel Garay

== Aggregate table ==
Pos	Team	Pld	W	D	L	GF	GA	GD	Pts	Qualification or relegation
1	Cienciano	52	29	14	9	94	54	+40	101	2005 Copa Libertadores First Stage
2	Alianza Lima (C)	52	29	12	11	79	39	+40	99	2005 Copa Libertadores Second Stage
3	Sporting Cristal	52	29	8	15	105	61	+44	95	2005 Copa Libertadores Second Stage
4	Alianza Atlético	52	27	11	14	87	63	+24	92	2005 Copa Sudamericana First Stage
5	Universitario	52	22	18	12	65	53	+12	84	2005 Copa Sudamericana First Stage
6	Unión Huaral	52	20	15	17	67	59	+8	75	
7	Universidad César Vallejo	52	16	15	21	48	72	−24	63	
8	Melgar	52	17	11	24	78	82	−4	62	
9	Sport Boys	52	16	14	22	67	80	−13	62	
10	Coronel Bolognesi	52	17	9	26	85	85	0	60	
11	Atlético Universidad	52	13	18	21	67	80	−13	57	
12	Universidad San Martín	52	16	9	27	61	76	−15	57	
13	Deportivo Wanka	52	14	11	27	55	105	−50	50 (Note: Deportivo Wanka were docked 3 points for failing to pay players.)	
14	Grau–Estudiantes	52	10	13	29	40	85	−45	43 (Note: Grau-Estudiantes withdrew from tournament, lost last 4 games by walkover.)	

Updated to match(es) played on December 2004. Source: FIFA Standings
Rules for classification: 1) points; 2) goal difference; 3) number of goals scored.
(C) Champions

== Relegation table ==
Pos	Team	2003 Pts	2004 Pts	Total Pts	Total Pld	Avg	Relegation
1	Alianza Lima	80	99	179	89	2.01	
2	Sporting Cristal	76	95	171	89	1.92	
3	Cienciano	49	101	150	88	1.7	
4	Alianza Atlético	58	92	150	89	1.69	
5	Universitario	41	84	125	89	1.4	
6	Unión Huaral	50	75	125	89	1.4	
7	Sport Boys	58	62	120	89	1.35	
8	Coronel Bolognesi	60	60	120	89	1.35	
9	Universidad César Vallejo	—	63	63	52	1.21	
10	Melgar	44	62	106	89	1.19	
11	Universidad San Martín	—	57	57	52	1.1	
12	Atlético Universidad	33	57	90	88	1.02	
13	Deportivo Wanka (R)	32	50	82	89	0.92	Relegation to 2005 Segunda División
14	Grau–Estudiantes (R)	27	43	60	89	0.67	Relegation to 2005 Segunda División

Updated as of games played on December, 2005.

== Top scorers ==
Rank	Scorer	Club	Goals
1	(Uruguay) Gabriel Garcia	Melgar	35
2	(Peru) Johan Fano	Coronel Bolognesi	29
3	(Argentina) Luis Alberto Bonnet	Sporting Cristal	28
4	(Argentina) Sergio Ibarra	Cienciano	25
5	(Peru) Pedro García	Alianza Atlético	23
6	(Argentina) Sebastian Dominguez	Atlético Universidad	21
7	(Peru) Hernán Rengifo	Unión Huaral	18
8	(Peru) Miguel Mostto	Cienciano	17
8	(Peru) Junior Ross	Coronel Bolognesi	17

== See also ==
- 2004 Peruvian Segunda División
- 2004 Copa Perú
