= Sport Coopsol =

- Full name: Club Sport Coopsol
- Founded: 2000
- Ground: Estadio Municipal de Chorrillos, Lima
- Chairman: Freddy Ames
Home colours	Away colours

Sport Coopsol was a Peruvian football club, playing in the city of Lima.

== History ==
Sport Coopsol was founded in 2000 when business group "Grupo Cooperativa Solar (Coopsol)" acquired the club Telefunken 20, which last played in the 1999 Segunda División Peruana season. Under its new name, the club played its first season in the Peruvian Second Division in the 2000 Segunda División Peruana season, where they finished in 8th place out of 13. The club was the 2003 Segunda División Peruana champion and won promotion to the First Division for the 2004 Torneo Descentralizado season. However, Sport Coopsol decided to sell their spot in the Peruvian First Division to Universidad de San Martín de Porres who decided to form their own club, Club Deportivo Universidad de San Martín de Porres.

== Notable players ==
- José Carlos Fernández
- Víctor Anchante
- Jaime Muro Solis
- Jorge Alegría
- Marco Ruiz
- Manuel Ugaz

== Honours ==
=== National ===
- Peruvian Segunda División: 1
  - Winners (1): 2003

=== Regional ===
- Región IV: 1
  - Winners (1): 1998

== See also ==
- List of football clubs in Peru
- Peruvian football league system
