= Club Deportivo Social Cultural Somos Olímpico =

Peruvian football club

Somos Olímpico
- Full name: Club Deportivo Social Cultural Somos Olímpico
- Founded: 27 July 1972; 53 years ago
- Ground: Estadio Julio Montjoy, Lima
- Manager: Víctor Chávez
- League: Copa Perú
Home colours

Club Deportivo Social Cultural Somos Olímpico is a Peruvian football club located in the district of Santiago de Surco, Lima.

== History ==
Founded on 27 July 1972, as Olímpico San Luis, the club reached the Peruvian Second Division in 2000 and changed its name to Olímpico Somos Perú. It won the Second Division championship twice in a row in 2004 and 2005 but was unable to gain promotion to the First Division due to regulations that prevented the Second Division champion from being directly promoted to the First Division.

In 2006, it briefly merged with Aurora Miraflores and played under the name Olímpico Aurora Miraflores. In 2007, it relocated to Iquitos and played its final season in the Second Division as Loreto FC. In 2008, the club sold its license to Inti Gas (now Ayacucho FC) and ceased operations.

At the end of 2008, the club was reactivated under its current name (CDSC Somos Olímpico) and plays in the Santiago de Surco district league.

== Honours ==
=== National ===
- Peruvian Segunda División:

Winners (2): 2004, 2005

=== Regional ===
- Interligas de Lima:

Winners (2): 1999, 2017

- Liga Departamental de Lima:

Runner-up: 2017

== Notable players ==
Juan Luna was twice the top scorer in the second division while playing for the club in 2004 and 2005. Johnny Soto, Víctor Chávez, Carlos Barrena, Juan José Iriarte and the brothers Román and Rodolfo Ojeda were also part of Somos Olímpico in the 2000s.

== Managers ==
Rodolfo Chavarry and Ronald Amoretti won the Peruvian Second Division championship as club managers in 2004 and 2005, respectively. Víctor Chávez won the Interligas de Lima – a tournament bringing together the winners of Lima's district leagues – in 2017.

- (Peru) Michael Silva 1999–2000
- (Peru) Tito Morinaga 2000
- (Peru) Hugo Ochoa Tassara 2000
- (Peru) Michael Silva 2001–2002
- (Peru) Rodolfo Chávarry 2003–2004
- (Peru) Ronald Amoretti 2005
- (Peru) Jorge Machuca 2006–2007
- (Peru) David Pacheco 2008
- (Peru) Víctor Chávez 2014–2017

== See also ==
- List of football clubs in Peru
- Peruvian football league system
