= Peruvian football league system =

Football league system in South America

The Peruvian football league system is a complex system. Though the general outline includes the Liga 1, Liga 2, Liga 3 and Copa Perú. The Copa Perú is very large involving several stages and leagues within it. In addition, the Copa Perú is played within a year. Therefore, clubs who reach level 4 of the pyramid (National stage of the Copa Perú) will have climbed 3 levels in a one-year period.

== Men ==
Level	Division(s)/League(s)
1	Liga 1 (First Division); 18 clubs ↓ 2 relegated to Liga 2
2	Liga 2 (Second Division); 18 clubs ↑ 2 Promoted to Liga 1 ↓ 2 relegated to Liga 3
3	Liga 3 (Third Division); 36 clubs ↑ 2 Promoted to Liga 2 ↓ 4 relegated to Copa Perú
4	Copa Perú (National Stage); Champions and Runners-up of each departamental league 64 clubs ↑ 4 Promoted to Liga 3
5	Ligas Departamentales (Departmental stage – 25 leagues) Amazonas – Ancash – Apurímac – Arequipa – Ayacucho – Cajamarca – Callao – Cusco – Huancavelica – Huánuco – Ica – Junín – La Libertad – Lima – Madre de Dios – Moquegua – Pasco – Piura – Puno – San Martín – Tacna – Tumbes – Ucayali
6	Liga Provinciales (Provincial stage)
7	Ligas Distritales First Division (District stage)
8	Ligas Distritales Second Division

=== Historic tables ===
The following charts detail all league competitions organised by the Peruvian Football Federation:

==== Year by year ====
===== La Liga Peruana de fútbol (Lima & Callao) =====
Defunct tournaments indicated in

Peruvian football league system historical table (1912–1965)
Period	Level 1	Level 2	Level 3	Level 4	Level 5	Level 6
1912–1921	Primera División	Segunda División	Tercera División			
1922–1925		Segunda División	Tercera División			
1926–1928	Primera División	División Intermedia (Lima)	Segunda División Provincial (Lima)	Tercera División Provincial (Lima)		
1929	Primera División	Primera B	División Intermedia (Lima)	Segunda División Provincial (Lima)		
1930–1934	Primera División	División Intermedia (Lima)	Segunda División Provincial (Lima)	Tercera División Provincial (Lima)		
1935	Primera División	Primera B Liga Provincial del Callao	División Intermedia (Lima) División Intermedia (Callao)	Segunda División Provincial (Lima)	Tercera División Provincial (Lima)	
1936	Primera División	Primera División Unificada	División Intermedia (Lima) División Intermedia (Callao)	Segunda División Provincial (Lima) Segunda División Provincial (Callao)	Tercera División Provincial (Lima) Tercera División Provincial (Callao)	
1937–1940	Primera División	Liga Provincial de Lima Liga Provincial del Callao	División Intermedia (Lima) División Intermedia (Callao)	Segunda División Provincial (Lima) Segunda División Provincial (Callao)	Tercera División Provincial (Lima) Tercera División Provincial (Callao)	
1941	Primera División	Liga Regional de Lima y Callao	Segunda División Regional	Tercera División Regional		
1943–1950	Primera División	Segunda División	Liga Regional de Lima y Callao	Segunda División Regional	Tercera División Regional	
1951–1955	Primera División	Segunda División	Liguilla de Ascenso	Ligas Provincial de Lima Ligas Provincial del Callao	Segunda División Provincial (Lima) Segunda División Provincial (Callao)	Tercera División Provincial (Lima) Tercera División Provincial (Callao)
1956–1965	Primera División	Segunda División	Liguilla de Ascenso	Ligas Provincial de Lima Ligas Provincial del Callao Liga de los Balnearios del Sur	Segunda División Provincial (Lima) Segunda División Provincial (Callao)	Tercera División Provincial (Lima) Tercera División Provincial (Callao)

==== National era ====
Peruvian football league system historical table (1966–present)
Period	Level 1	Level 2	Level 3	Level 4	Level 5	Level 6	Level 7	Level 8
1966–1972	Primera División	Segunda División	Liguilla de Ascenso	Segunda División Provincial (Lima); Segunda División Provincial (Callao)	Ligas Provincial de Lima; Ligas Provincial del Callao; Liga de los Balnearios del Sur	Tercera División Provincial (Lima); Tercera División Provincial (Callao)		
1966–1972	Primera División	Copa Perú (National stage)	Ligas Departamentales (25 leagues)	Ligas Distritales First Division	Liga Provinciales	Ligas Distritales Second Division		
1973	Primera División	Reclasificatorio Regional	Ligas Departamentales (25 leagues)	Liga Provinciales	Ligas Distritales First Division	Ligas Distritales Second Division	Ligas Distritales Third Division	
1974–1982	Primera División	Copa Perú (National stage)	Región IX Metropolitana; Ligas Departamentales (25 leagues)	Liga Mayor de Lima; Liga Provinciales	Ligas Distritales First Division	Ligas Distritales Second Division	Ligas Distritales Third Division	
1983	Primera División	Segunda División; Copa Perú (National stage)	Región IX Metropolitana; Ligas Departamentales (25 leagues)	Liga Mayor de Lima; Liga Provinciales	Ligas Distritales First Division	Ligas Distritales Second Division	Ligas Distritales Third Division	
1984–1987	Primera División	División Intermedia	Segunda División; Copa Perú (National stage)	Ligas Departamentales (25 leagues)	Liga Mayor de Lima; Región IX Metropolitana	Ligas Distritales First Division	Ligas Distritales Second Division	Ligas Distritales Third Division
1988–1991	Primera División	Segunda División; Etapa Regional	Región IX Metropolitana; Ligas Departamentales (25 leagues)	Liga Provinciales	Ligas Distritales First Division	Ligas Distritales Second Division	Ligas Distritales Third Division	
1992	Primera División	Torneo Zonal	Segunda División; Ligas Departamentales (25 leagues)	Liga Provinciales; Región Promocional Lima; Región Promocional Callao	Ligas Distritales First Division	Ligas Distritales Second Division	Ligas Distritales Third Division	
1993–2006	Primera División	Segunda División; Copa Perú (National stage)	Etapa Regional (1998 – 2006)	Ligas Departamentales (25 leagues)	Región Promocional de Lima & Callao (1993-1996); Liga Provinciales	Ligas Distritales First Division	Ligas Distritales Second Division	Ligas Distritales Third Division
2007–2018	Primera División	Segunda División; Copa Perú (National stage)	Etapa Regional (2007 – 2014)	Ligas Departamentales (25 leagues)	Liga Provinciales; Ligas Superiores	Ligas Distritales First Division	Ligas Distritales Second Division	Ligas Distritales Third Division
2019–2022	Liga 1	Liga 2 Copa Perú (National stage – 50 club)	Ligas Departamentales (25 leagues)	Liga Provinciales; Ligas Superiores	Ligas Distritales First Division	Ligas Distritales Second Division	Ligas Distritales Third Division	
2023–2024	Liga 1	Liga 2	Copa Perú (National stage – 50 clubs)	Ligas Departamentales (25 leagues)	Liga Provinciales	Ligas Distritales First Division	Ligas Distritales Second Division	
2025	Liga 1	Liga 2	Liga 3	Copa Perú (National stage – 64 clubs)	Ligas Departamentales (25 leagues)	Liga Provinciales	Ligas Distritales First Division	Ligas Distritales Second Division
2026–	Liga 1	Liga 2	Liga 3	Copa Perú (National stage – 64 clubs); Tradición Copera	Ligas Departamentales (25 leagues)	Liga Provinciales	Ligas Distritales First Division	Ligas Distritales Second Division

== Women ==
Level	Division(s)/League(s)
1	Liga Femenina FPF (Primera División Femenina); 12 clubs ↓ 2 relegated to Liga de Ascenso
2	Liga de Ascenso Femenina (National stage); 25 clubs ↑ 2 Promoted to Liga Femenina FPF
3	Ligas Departamentales (Departmental stage – 25 leagues)

== See also ==
- Peruvian Primera División
- Peruvian Segunda División
- Liga 3
- Copa Perú
- Ligas Superiores del Peru
- List of football clubs in Peru
