= Deportivo Coopsol =

Peruvian football club based in Lima, founded in 1964

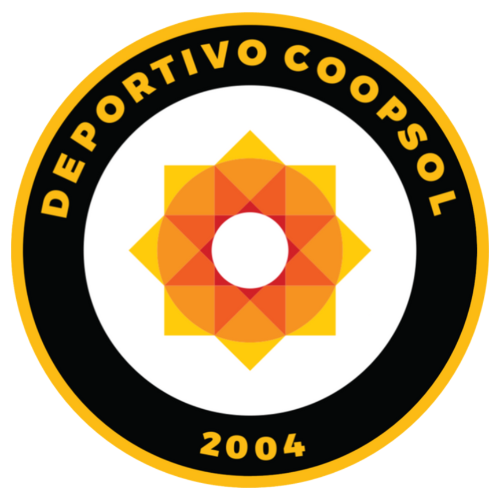
- Full name: Club Deportivo Coopsol
- Nickname: Submarino Amarillo
- Founded: July 31, 1964; 61 years ago
- Ground: Estadio Rómulo Shaw Cisneros
- Capacity: 3,000
- Chairman: Freddy Ames
- Manager: Javier Arce
- League: Liga 3
- Website: http://www.deportivocoopsol.com/
Home colours	Away colours

Club Deportivo Coopsol is a Peruvian professional football club based in Chancay, Lima. The club was founded in 1964 under their original name Club Deportivo Seman-FAP (Fuerza Aérea del Perú). Later in 1999 the club's name was changed to Aviación-FAP. In 2001 they were known as Deportivo Aviación, and changed to their current name Deportivo Coopsol in 2009. The club currently participates in the Liga 2.

== History ==
The club was founded on July 31, 1964 under the name Club Deportivo Seman-FAP (Fuerza Aérea del Perú) as the football team representing the Peruvian Air Force.

In 1999 the club was promoted to the Peruvian Second Division for the 1999 Segunda División Peruana season.

The club was 2000 Segunda División Peruana champion, but was defeated by Universidad Privada Antenor Orrego in the Promotion Play-off.

In the 2005, the club was acquired by the Coopsol Group. In the May 2009, the club changed its name to Deportivo Coopsol.

== Club name changes ==
Season	Club name
1964–1998	Deportivo Seman-FAP
1999–2000	Aviación-FAP
2001–2003	Deportivo Aviación
2004–2008	Aviación-Coopsol
2009–present	Deportivo Coopsol

== Historic badges ==
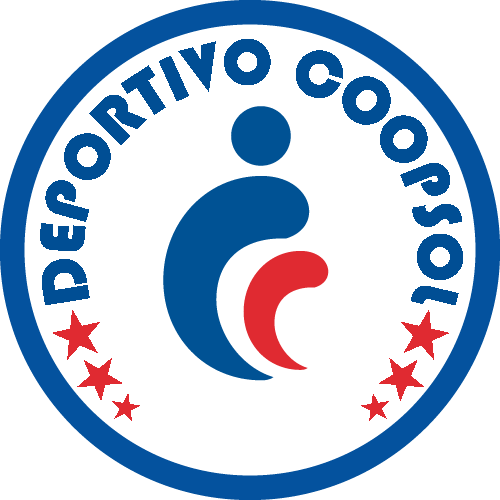
2009–15

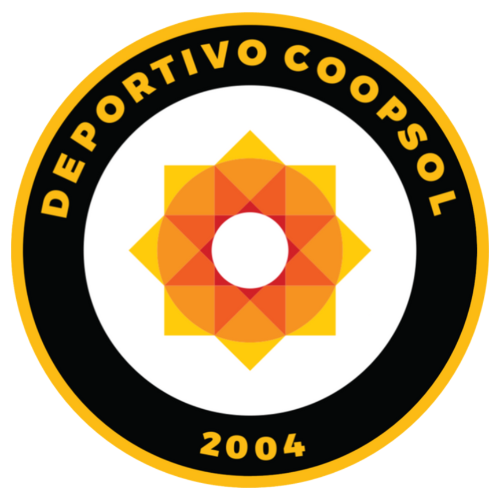
2025–present

== Stadium ==
Deportivo Coopsol plays their home games at Estadio Rómulo Shaw Cisneros, located in Chancay. The stadium has a capacity of 3,000.

== Current squad ==
As of March 16, 2025

Note: Flags indicate national team as defined under FIFA eligibility rules; some limited exceptions apply. Players may hold more than one non-FIFA nationality.

No.	Pos.	Nation	Player
1	GK	COL	Esteban Ruíz
5	MF	ARG	Emiliano Ciucci
6	MF	PER	Christian Sánchez
7	MF	PER	Rolando Arrasco
8	FW	PER	Jared Ulloa
10	MF	PER	Joazhiño Arroe
11	FW	PER	Jefferson Mendoza
12	GK	PER	Sebastián Sotelo
13	DF	PER	Franshesko Cassiano
14	DF	PER	Ramón Rengifo
17	MF	PER	Fernando Melgar
19	MF	PER	Roger Chinga
20	FW	PER	Diego Espinoza
22	MF	PER	Jairo Martínez

No.	Pos.	Nation	Player
26	FW	COL	Luther Rueda
29	FW	PER	Marlon Perea
30	MF	PER	Sebastián Sánchez
33	MF	PER	Josepmir Ballón (Captain)
88	DF	PER	Giancarlo Peña
-	DF	PER	Junior Huerto
-	DF	PER	Polo Castillo
-	DF	PER	Willian Navarro
-	MF	PER	Mariano Gonzales
-	MF	PER	Jarek Elías
-	FW	COL	Olmes García
-	FW	PER	Marcello Negrón
-	FW	PER	Josdall Vásquez

== Honours ==
=== Senior titles ===
Keys

- Record
- ^{(s)} Shared record

Type	Competition	Titles	Runner-up	Winning years	Runner-up years
National (League)	Segunda División	1	4	2000	2005, 2011, 2012, 2014
Regional (League)	Liga Provincial de Lima	1	—	1998	—
Regional (League)	Liga Distrital de Barranco	1	—	1998	—

== See also ==
- List of football clubs in Peru
- Peruvian football league system
