= Virgen de Chapi FC =

Peruvian football club

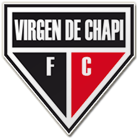
- Full name: Virgen de Chapi FC
- Founded: October 22, 1992
- Chairman: Juan Carlos Torres Pinto
- League: Copa Perú
Home colours

Virgen de Chapi FC is a Peruvian football club, playing in the city of Lima, Peru.

== History ==
Virgen de Chapi FC was founded on October 22, 1992. The club participated in the 1996 Segunda División Peruana, but was relegated the same year.

The club returned to the Peruvian Segunda División, and played from 1998 Segunda División Peruana until 2005, when it was relegated to the Copa Perú.

== Honours ==
=== Regional ===
- Liga Departamental de Lima:

Winners (1): 1995

- Liga Provincial de Lima:

Winners (2): 1995, 1997

- Liga Distrital de Santa Anita:

Winners (4): 1995, 2018, 2019, 2024
Runner-up (2): 2009, 2016

== See also ==
- List of football clubs in Peru
- Peruvian football league system
