= Deportivo AELU =

AELU
- Full name: Club Deportivo Asociación Estadio La Unión
- Nickname: El equipo nisei
- Founded: December 5, 1982
- Ground: Estadio La Union, Lima
- Capacity: 10,000
- League: Copa Perú
Home colours	Away colours

Club Deportivo Asociación Estadio La Unión, commonly known as Deportivo AELU or simply AELU, is a Peruvian football club, playing in the city of Lima, Peru.

== History ==
The Asociación Estadio La Unión was founded 1982 by the nikkei community of Peru.

The AELU, as popularly is known, was the 1987 Segunda División Peruana champion.

The club has played at the highest level of Peruvian football on four occasions, from 1988 Torneo Descentralizado until 1991 Torneo Descentralizado when it was relegated.

In the 1993 Segunda División Peruana, the club was relegated to Copa Perú.

The club returned in the 1997 Segunda División Peruana until 2005.

== Honours ==
=== National ===
- Peruvian Segunda División
  - Winners (1): 1987
  - Runners-up (3): 1984, 1986, 2001

=== Regional ===
- Liga Departamental de Lima
  - Winners (1): 1996
- Liga Provincial de Lima
  - Winners (1): 1996
- Liga Distrital de Pueblo Libre
  - Winners (12): 2009, 2010, 2012, 2014, 2015, 2016, 2017, 2018, 2019, 2022, 2023, 2024
  - Runners-up (3): 2011, 2013, 2025

== See also ==
- List of football clubs in Peru
- Peruvian football league system
